= 2024 Women's Premier Hockey League =

Hockey New Zealand's national league, second season

Tournament details
- Host country: New Zealand
- Dates: 2 November – 7 December
- Teams: 4
- Venue: 9 (in 8 host cities)

Final positions
- Champions: Central Falcons (2nd title)
- Runner-up: Northern Tridents
- Third place: Southern Alpiners

Tournament statistics
- Matches played: 14
- Goals scored: 71 (5.07 per match)
- Top scorer: Kelsey Smith (CF) (8 goals)

The 2024 Women's Premier Hockey League was the second season of New Zealand's national league. The tournament was held across nine cities of New Zealand, culminating with finals at the North Harbour Hockey Centre in Auckland. Competition commenced on 2 November, culminating with finals matches on 7 December.

Central Falcons won their second title, defeating the Northern Tridents 5–1 in the final.

Following a four-year hiatus, the league returned under new private ownership.

== Competition format ==
=== Format ===
The 2024 Premier Hockey League will follow the same format of the inaugural season. Teams will play in a double round-robin format during the Pool Stage, followed by two Classification Matches. Following the results of the Pool Stage, the top two ranked teams will contest the final, while the bottom two ranked teams will play off for third place.

=== Point allocation ===
Match points will be distributed as follows:

- 4 points: win
- 2 points: shoot-out win
- 1 points: shoot-out loss
- 0 points: loss

== Participating teams ==
The four teams competing in the league come from the various regions of New Zealand.

Central Falcons

Head Coach: Verity Sharland

1. Julia Gluyas (GK)
2. Saasha Marsters (GK)
5. Riana Pho
6. Rebecca Baker
7. Kelsey Smith
8. Felicity Reidy
9. Emma Rainey
10. Emily Gaddum
13. Michaela Curtis
16. Amy Bunny
17. Rileigh Knapp
18. Anna Crowley
19. Jodie Kent
20. Megan Gibson (C)
21. Kaitlin Cotter
22. Olivia Shannon
23. Hannah Donald
24. Emma Findlay
25. Amy Robinson
26. Anna Willocks
27. Stephanie Dickins (C)
30. Hope Ralph
31. Aniwaka Haumaha
Hauraki Mavericks

Head Coach: Danielle Cranston

1. Brodie Cochrane (GK)
2. Jayda Pawhau (GK)
4. Murphy Phillips
5. Katherine Winter
6. Antonia Cortesi
7. Deanna Ritchie
8. Sharnae Taylor
9. Ella Leighton
10. Leah Hodges
11. Ruby Baker
12. Jamee Webber
13. Zoe Teikamata
14. Lucy Russ
15. Julia King (C)
16. Rocío González
18. Isabella Gill
20. Greer Findlay
21. Samantha Child
22. Hannah Findlay
30. Phoebe Steele
31. Victoria Methven
Northern Tridents

Head Coach: (Australia) Emily Hurtz

1. Madeline Harris
3. Sophie Hildesley
4. Petrea Neal
6. Saffron Cribb
7. Breana Catley
10. Kaea Elliott
13. Emilie Logan
14. Holly Hilton-Jones
15. Tyla Goodsell-Matthews
16. Holly Pearson
17. Paige Blake
18. Ella Hyatt Brown (C)
20. Charlie Wills
21. Ruby Worrall
23. Emilie Gordon
25. Claudia Hanham
26. Elizabeth Norman
27. Georgina Shotter
28. Philippa Norman
32. Brooke Roberts (GK)
33. Madeleine Forbes (GK)
Southern Alpiners

Head Coach: Chris Leslie

1. Kirsten Nation (GK)
2. Jessica Anderson
3. Emilia Surridge
4. Jaimee Eades
5. Rosanna Bedford
6. Tessa Jopp (C)
7. Aleisha Davis
8. Isabella Story
9. Jenna-Rae McIntyre
10. Brittany Wang
11. Ruby Roberts
12. Isabella Ambrosius
13. Annabelle Schneideman
14. Arabella Sheild (C)
15. Amelia Calder
16. Sophie Nation
18. Tessa Reid
23. Cara Morrison
25. Anneka Calder
32. Pippa Croft (GK)

== Venues ==
Auckland
Lloyd Elsmore Park
National Hockey Centre
Christchurch
Ngā Puna Wai Sports Hub
Dunedin
Alexander McMillan Hockey Centre
Hamilton
St Paul's Collegiate School
Mount Maunganui
Tauranga Hockey Association
Napier
Park Island Recreation Ground
Palmerston North
Massey University Hockey Turf
Wellington
National Hockey Stadium

== Results ==
All times are local (New Zealand Daylight Time).

=== Preliminary round ===
Pos	Team	Pld	W	WD	LD	L	GF	GA	GD	Pts	Qualification
1	Central Falcons	6	4	1	0	1	21	11	+10	18	Advanced to Final
2	Northern Tridents	6	2	0	2	2	18	12	+6	10	Advanced to Final
3	Hauraki Mavericks	6	2	0	1	3	10	18	−8	9	
4	Southern Alpiners	6	1	2	0	3	9	17	−8	8	

Source: Premier Hockey League
Rules for classification: 1) points; 2) matches won; 3) goal difference; 4) goals for; 5) head-to-head result; 6) field goals scored.

==== Fixtures ====
2 November 2024
16:00

Northern Tridents	6–0	Hauraki Mavericks
Blake 4'; Norman 25'; Hildesley 57', 57'; Neal 59', 59'	Report

Lloyd Elsmore Park, Auckland
Umpires:
Amber Church (NZL)
Kelly Hudson (NZL)

3 November 2024
11:00

Southern Alpiners	0–3	Central Falcons
	Report	Smith 8', 9'; Curtis 29'

Alexander McMillan Hockey Centre, Dunedin
Umpires:
Lani Nichol (NZL)
Katrina Turner (NZL)

9 November 2024
14:00

Central Falcons	5–5	Northern Tridents
Willocks 18', 28'; Curtis 28', 28'; Shannon 43'	Report	Pearson 2', 2', 56', 56'; Neal 54'
Penalties
Willocks (penalty shoot-out missed); Shannon (penalty shoot-out scored); Pho (penalty shoot-out scored); Gibson (penalty shoot-out missed); Rainey (penalty shoot-out missed)	2–1	(penalty shoot-out scored) Catley; (penalty shoot-out missed) Harris; (penalty shoot-out missed) Hildesley; (penalty shoot-out missed) Pearson; (penalty shoot-out missed) Blake

Park Island Recreation Ground, Napier
Umpires:
David Tomlinson (NZL)
Kelly-Anne Foskin (NZL)

10 November 2024
13:00

Southern Alpiners	1–1	Hauraki Mavericks
Story 2'	Report	Gill 28'
Penalties
Surridge (penalty shoot-out missed); McIntyre (penalty shoot-out scored); Wang (penalty shoot-out scored); Jopp (penalty shoot-out missed); Ambrosius (penalty shoot-out scored)	3–1	(penalty shoot-out scored) Gill; (penalty shoot-out missed) Cortesi; (penalty shoot-out missed) Winter; (penalty shoot-out missed) Leighton

Ngā Puna Wai Sports Hub, Christchurch
Umpires:
Benjamin Grant (NZL)
Rachel Williams (ENG)

16 November 2024
14:00

Central Falcons	6–2	Southern Alpiners
Smith 2', 2', 29', 30'; Shannon 10'; Cotter 25'	Report	Calder 5'; Reid 18'

National Hockey Stadium, Wellington
Umpires:
Kelly-Anne Foskin (NZL)
Katrina Turner (NZL)

17 November 2024
13:00

Hauraki Mavericks	3–2	Northern Tridents
Findlay 18', 18'; King 19'	Report	Neal 25'; Pearson 34'

Tauranga Hockey Association, Mount Maunganui
Umpires:
Kelly Hudson (NZL)
Rachel Williams (ENG)

23 November 2024
16:00

Northern Tridents	0–1	Central Falcons
	Report	Shannon 5'

National Hockey Centre, Auckland
Umpires:
Rachel Williams (ENG)
Kelly-Anne Foskin (NZL)

23 November 2024
16:30

Hauraki Mavericks	2–3	Southern Alpiners
Taylor 53'; Russ 58'	Report	McIntyre 29', 29'; Calder 60'

St Paul's Collegiate School, Hamilton
Umpires:
Timothy Bond (NZL)
Bevan Nichol (NZL)

24 November 2024
15:00

Northern Tridents	4–2	Southern Alpiners
Catley 20', 20'; Neal 41'; Hildesley 55'	Report	Surridge 23'; McIntyre 37'

National Hockey Centre, Auckland
Umpires:
Kelly-Anne Foskin (NZL)
Nicholas Saunders (NZL)

24 November 2024
15:30

Hauraki Mavericks	0–3	Central Falcons
	Report	Shannon 30'; Willocks 45', 45'

St Paul's Collegiate School, Hamilton
Umpires:
Rachel Williams (ENG)
Kelly Hudson (NZL)

30 November 2024
16:00

Central Falcons	3–4	Hauraki Mavericks
Cotter 34', 53'; Curtis 49'	Report	Baker 17'; Gill 32'; Russ 40'; Leighton 47'

Massey University Hockey Turf, Palmerston North
Umpires:
David Tomlinson (NZL)
Kelly-Anne Foskin (NZL)

1 December 2024
13:00

Southern Alpiners	1–1	Northern Tridents
Wang 12'	Report	Norman 34'
Penalties
McIntyre (penalty shoot-out scored); Reid (penalty shoot-out scored); Wang (penalty shoot-out scored); Ambrosius (penalty shoot-out missed); Davis (penalty shoot-out scored)	4–3	(penalty shoot-out scored) Catley; (penalty shoot-out scored) Hildesley; (penalty shoot-out scored) Pearson; (penalty shoot-out missed) Neal; (penalty shoot-out missed) Hilton-Jones

Ngā Puna Wai Sports Hub, Christchurch
Umpires:
Kelly Hudson (NZL)
Katrina Turner (NZL)

=== Classification round ===
==== Third and fourth place ====
7 December 2024
13:15

Hauraki Mavericks	1–6	Southern Alpiners
Teikamata 21'	Report	McIntyre 2', 2', 31'; Wang 10'; Ambrosius 29'; Roberts 34'

National Hockey Centre, Auckland
Umpires:
Lani Nichol (NZL)
Katrina Turner (NZL)

==== Final ====
7 December 2024
17:15

Central Falcons	5–1	Northern Tridents
Smith 11', 11'; Willocks 33', 33'; Kent 50'	Report	Blake 58'

National Hockey Centre, Auckland
Umpires:
Kelly Hudson (NZL)
David Tomlinson (NZL)

== Final standings ==
Pos	Team	Pld	W	WD	LD	L	GF	GA	GD	Pts
1st place, gold medalist(s)	Central Falcons	7	5	1	0	1	26	12	+14	22
2nd place, silver medalist(s)	Northern Tridents	7	2	0	2	3	19	17	+2	10
3rd place, bronze medalist(s)	Southern Alpiners	7	2	2	0	3	15	18	−3	12
4	Hauraki Mavericks	7	2	0	1	4	11	24	−13	9

Source: Hockey New Zealand

== Goalscorers ==
There were 71 goals scored in 14 matches, for an average of 5.07 goals per match.

8 goals

- Kelsey Smith (CF)

6 goals

- Anna Willocks (CF)
- Jenna-Rae McIntyre (SA)

5 goals

- Petrea Neal (NT)
- Holly Pearson (NT)

4 goals

- Michaela Curtis (CF)
- Olivia Shannon (CF)

3 goals

- Kaitlin Cotter (CF)
- Sophie Hildesley (NT)

2 goals

- Greer Findlay (HM)
- Isabella Gill (HM)
- Lucy Russ (HM)
- Paige Blake (NT)
- Breana Catley (NT)
- Philippa Norman (NT)
- Amelia Calder (SA)
- Brittany Wang (SA)

1 goal

- Jodie Kent (CF)
- Ruby Baker (HM)
- Julia King (HM)
- Ella Leighton (HM)
- Sharnae Taylor (HM)
- Zoe Teikamata (HM)
- Isabella Ambrosius (SA)
- Tessa Reid (SA)
- Ruby Roberts (SA)
- Isabella Story (SA)
- Emelia Surridge (SA)

Source: Hockey New Zealand
