= 2025 Women's Premier Hockey League =

Hockey New Zealand's national league, second season

Tournament details
- Host country: New Zealand
- Dates: 8 November – 13 December
- Teams: 4
- Venue: 8 (in 7 host cities)

Final positions
- Champions: Northern Tridents (1st title)
- Runner-up: Central Falcons
- Third place: Southern Alpiners

Tournament statistics
- Matches played: 14
- Goals scored: 49 (3.5 per match)
- Top scorer: Lucy Russ (HM) (4 goals)

The 2025 Women's Premier Hockey League was the third season of New Zealand's national league. The tournament was held across seven cities of New Zealand, culminating with finals at Lloyd Elsmore Park in Auckland. Competition commenced on 8 November and culminated with finals matches on 13 December.

== Competition format ==
=== Format ===
The 2025 Premier Hockey League will follow the same format of the previous season. Teams will play in a double round-robin format during the Pool Stage, followed by two Classification Matches. Following the results of the Pool Stage, the top two ranked teams will contest the final, while the bottom two ranked teams will play off for third place.

=== Point allocation ===
Match points will be distributed as follows:

- 4 points: win
- 2 points: shoot-out win
- 1 points: shoot-out loss
- 0 points: loss

== Participating teams ==
The four teams competing in the league come from the various regions of New Zealand.

Central Falcons

Head Coach:

1. Team List
Hauraki Mavericks

Head Coach:

1. Team List
Northern Tridents

Head Coach:

1. Team List
Southern Alpiners

Head Coach:

1. Team List

== Venues ==
Auckland
Lloyd Elsmore Park
National Hockey Centre
Christchurch
Nunweek Park
Dunedin
Alexander McMillan Hockey Centre
Hamilton
Gallagher Hockey Centre
Napier
Park Island Recreation Ground
Wellington
National Hockey Stadium
Whangārei
ITM Hockey Centre

== Results ==
All times are local (New Zealand Daylight Time).

=== Preliminary round ===
==== Standings ====
Pos	Team	Pld	W	WD	LD	L	GF	GA	GD	Pts	Qualification
1	Central Falcons	6	4	0	0	2	11	8	+3	16	Advanced to Final
2	Northern Tridents	6	3	0	1	2	13	7	+6	13	Advanced to Final
3	Hauraki Mavericks	6	2	1	0	3	10	13	−3	10	
4	Southern Alpiners	6	2	0	0	4	10	16	−6	8	

Source: Hockey New Zealand
Rules for classification: 1) points; 2) matches won; 3) goal difference; 4) goals for; 5) head-to-head result; 6) field goals scored.

==== Fixtures ====
8 November 2024
17:30

Central Falcons	2–0	Hauraki Mavericks
Curtis 34'; Cotter 40'	Report

Park Island Recreation Ground, Napier
Umpires:
Lani Nichol (NZL)
Anton Paulin (NZL)

9 November 2024
17:30

Southern Alpiners	4–3	Northern Tridents
Ambrosius 18'; Surridge 34', 45', 45'	Report	Pearson 16', 16'; Bannatyne 38'

Alexander McMillan Hockey Centre, Dunedin
Umpires:
Kaitlyn Pennell (NZL)
Katrina Turner (NZL)

15 November 2024
15:00

Hauraki Mavericks	3–0	Southern Alpiners
Ritchie 26', 26'; Russ 37'	Report

Gallagher Hockey Centre, Hamilton
Umpires:
Rachel Williams (ENG)
Michael Marychurch (NZL)

15 November 2024
16:00

Northern Tridents	0–1	Central Falcons
	Report	Wairau-Hunter 10'

National Hockey Centre, Auckland
Umpires:
Lani Nichol (NZL)
Kelly-Anne Foskin (NZL)

16 November 2024
14:30

Northern Tridents	2–0	Southern Alpiners
Thompson 55', 55'	Report

Lloyd Elsmore Park, Auckland
Umpires:
Lani Nichol (NZL)
Rachel Williams (ENG)

16 November 2024
15:00

Hauraki Mavericks	2–3	Central Falcons
Teikamata 35', 35'	Report	Ralph 2'; Pho 17', 47'

Gallagher Hockey Centre, Hamilton
Umpires:
Kelly-Anne Foskin (NZL)
Kaitlyn Pennell (NZL)

22 November 2024
13:00

Northern Tridents	1–1	Hauraki Mavericks
Crowley 42'	Report	Ru. Baker 38'
Penalties
Hildesley (penalty shoot-out scored); Hyatt Brown (penalty shoot-out missed); Thompson (penalty shoot-out missed); Pearson (penalty shoot-out missed); Crowley (penalty shoot-out missed)	1–2	(penalty shoot-out missed) Ru. Baker; (penalty shoot-out scored) Arnold; (penalty shoot-out missed) Re. Baker; (penalty shoot-out scored) Volkert; (penalty shoot-out missed) Ritchie

ITM Hockey Centre, Whangārei
Umpires:
Rachel Williams (ENG)
Kelly Hudson (NZL)

22 November 2024
13:30

Southern Alpiners	3–1	Central Falcons
Reid 6', 16'; Schneideman 27'	Report	Kelly 7'

Nunweek Park, Christchurch
Umpires:
Katrina Turner (NZL)
Caleb Hansen (NZL)

6 December 2024
13:00

Hauraki Mavericks	1–5	Northern Tridents
Russ 15'	Report	Crowley 17'; Catley 24', 24'; Tynan 45'; Pearson 47'

Gallagher Hockey Centre, Hamilton
Umpires:
Rachel Williams (ENG)
Ryan Potter (NZL)

6 December 2024
14:00

Central Falcons	4–1	Southern Alpiners
Ralph 17'; Shannon 19'; Curtis 39', 40'	Report	Anderson 25'

National Hockey Stadium, Wellington
Umpires:
Kelly Hudson (NZL)
Kaitlyn Pennell (NZL)

7 December 2024
13:00

Central Falcons	0–2	Northern Tridents
	Report	Tynan 2', 3'

National Hockey Stadium, Wellington
Umpires:
Kaitlyn Pennell (NZL)
Kelly Hudson (NZL)

7 December 2024
14:00

Southern Alpiners	2–3	Hauraki Mavericks
Wang 27'; Reid 31'	Report	Volkert 21'; Russ 43', 43'

Nunweek Park, Christchurch
Umpires:
Kelly-Anne Foskin (NZL)
Katrina Turner (NZL)

=== Classification round ===
==== Third and fourth place ====
12 December 2024
17:30

Hauraki Mavericks	0–0	Southern Alpiners
	Report
Penalties
Volkert (penalty shoot-out missed); Arnold (penalty shoot-out missed); Re. Baker (penalty shoot-out missed); Russ (penalty shoot-out missed); Ru. Baker (penalty shoot-out missed)	0–1	(penalty shoot-out missed) Anderson; (penalty shoot-out missed) Wang; (penalty shoot-out scored) Calder; (penalty shoot-out missed) Ambrosius

Lloyd Elsmore Park, Auckland
Umpires:
Kaitlyn Pennell (NZL)
Katrina Turner (NZL)

==== Final ====
13 December 2024
12:00

Central Falcons	2–3	Northern Tridents
Shannon 21', 22'	Report	Harris 14', 50'; Catley 43'

Lloyd Elsmore Park, Auckland
Umpires:
Kelly-Anne Foskin (NZL)
Katrina Turner (NZL)

== Final standings ==
Pos	Team	Pld	W	WD	LD	L	GF	GA	GD	Pts
1st place, gold medalist(s)	Northern Tridents	7	4	0	1	2	16	9	+7	17
2nd place, silver medalist(s)	Central Falcons	7	4	0	0	3	13	11	+2	16
3rd place, bronze medalist(s)	Southern Alpiners	7	2	1	0	4	10	16	−6	10
4	Hauraki Mavericks	7	2	1	1	3	10	13	−3	11

Source: Hockey New Zealand

== Goalscorers ==
There were 49 goals scored in 14 matches, for an average of 3.5 goals per match.

4 goals

- Lucy Russ (HM)

3 goals

- Michaela Curtis (CF)
- Olivia Shannon (CF)
- Breana Catley (NT)
- Holly Pearson (NT)
- Rose Tynan (NT)
- Tessa Reid (SA)
- Emelia Surridge (SA)

2 goals

- Hope Ralph (CF)
- Riana Pho (CF)
- Deanna Ritchie (HM)
- Zoe Teikamata (HM)
- Casey Crowley (NT)
- Madeline Harris (NT)
- Elizabeth Thompson (NT)

1 goal

- Kaitlin Cotter (CF)
- Jessica Kelly (CF)
- Kiri Wairau-Hunter (CF)
- Ruby Baker (HM)
- Alessa Volkert (HM)
- Lucy Bannatyne (NT)
- Isabella Ambrosius (SA)
- Jessica Anderson (SA)
- Annabelle Schneideman (SA)
- Brittany Wang (SA)

Source: Hockey New Zealand
