= 2019 Women's Ford National Hockey League =

Tournament details
- Host country: New Zealand
- City: Tauranga
- Dates: 14–22 September
- Teams: 8
- Venue: Tauranga Hockey Association

Final positions
- Champions: –– North Harbour (5th title)
- Runner-up: –– Northland
- Third place: –– Canterbury

Tournament statistics
- Matches played: 28
- Goals scored: 103 (3.68 per match)
- Top scorer: –– Gemma McCaw (8 goals)
- Best player: –– Stephanie Dickins

The 2019 Women's Ford National Hockey League was the 21st and final edition of the women's field hockey tournament. The competition was held in Tauranga, New Zealand, between 14 and 22 September.

North Harbour won the title for the fifth time, equalling the record for most wins previously set by Auckland. The team defeated Northland 2–0 in the final. Canterbury finished in third place after defeating Central 2–1.

In 2020, the tournament will be replaced by the Premier Hockey League.

== Participating teams ==
The following eight teams competed for the title:

- –– Auckland
- –– Canterbury
- –– Capital
- –– Central
- –– Midlands
- –– Northland
- –– North Harbour
- –– Southern

== Results ==
=== Preliminary round ===
==== Pool A ====
Pos	Team	Pld	W	WD	LD	L	PF	PA	PD	Pts	Qualification
1	–– Canterbury	3	2	0	0	1	7	4	+3	8	Advanced to Medal Round
2	–– North Harbour	3	2	0	0	1	7	4	+3	8	Advanced to Medal Round
3	–– Auckland	3	2	0	0	1	7	6	+1	8	
4	–– Southern	3	0	0	0	3	1	8	−7	0	

Source: Hockey NZ

14 September 2019
12:30

North Harbour ––	2–1	–– Southern
Polovnikoff 16'; Gomes 46'	Report	Duncan 51'

Umpires:
Amber Church (NZL)
Kirsten Stuckey (NZL)

14 September 2019
14:30

Auckland ––	3–2	–– Canterbury
Lench 27'; Ritchie 47', 58'	Report	Willis 14'; Tinning 51'

Umpires:
Kelly Hudson (NZL)
Rachel Murphy (NZL)

15 September 2019
11:45

North Harbour ––	1–2	–– Canterbury
Robinson 55'	Report	Wium 24'; Cox 34'

Umpires:
Lucy Lawlor (NZL)
Joanne Cumming (NZL)

15 September 2019
13:45

Auckland ––	3–0	–– Southern
Doar 4', 49'; Lench 36'	Report

Umpires:
Lani Jackman (NZL)
Rachel Murphy (NZL)

16 September 2019
13:30

North Harbour ––	4–1	–– Auckland
Sanguinetti 12'; Robinson 23'; Dickins 25'; Polovnikoff 34'	Report	Tynan 23'

Umpires:
Katrina Turner (NZL)
Lucy Lawlor (NZL)

16 September 2019
15:30

Canterbury ––	3–0	–– Southern
Wium 13', 13', 14'	Report

Umpires:
Kirsten Stuckey (NZL)
Rachel Murphy (NZL)

==== Pool B ====
Pos	Team	Pld	W	WD	LD	L	PF	PA	PD	Pts	Qualification
1	–– Northland	3	1	1	1	0	8	5	+3	7	Advanced to Medal Round
2	–– Central	3	1	1	1	0	5	4	+1	7	Advanced to Medal Round
3	–– Midlands	3	1	1	1	0	5	4	+1	7	
4	–– Capital	3	0	0	0	3	1	6	−5	0	

Source: Hockey NZ

14 September 2019
16:30

Central ––	2–2	–– Northland
Ralph 21'; Norman 47'	Report	Michelsen 48'; Neal 56'
Penalties
Ralph (penalty shoot-out scored); Shannon (penalty shoot-out missed); Curtis (penalty shoot-out missed); Norman (penalty shoot-out missed); Rainey (penalty shoot-out scored) —— Ralph (penalty shoot-out scored); Curtis (penalty shoot-out scored); Rainey (penalty shoot-out missed)	4–5	(penalty shoot-out missed) Taseska; (penalty shoot-out scored) Evans; (penalty shoot-out missed) Crum; (penalty shoot-out scored) Gunson; (penalty shoot-out missed) Michelsen —— (penalty shoot-out scored) Gunson; (penalty shoot-out scored) Evans; (penalty shoot-out scored) Michelsen

Umpires:
Lani Jackman (NZL)
Lucy Lawlor (NZL)

14 September 2019
18:30

Midlands ––	1–0	–– Capital
Morton 36'	Report

Umpires:
Joanne Cumming (NZL)
Katrina Turner (NZL)

15 September 2019
15:45

Midlands ––	3–3	–– Northland
McCaw 20', 59'; Brill 47'	Report	Evans 16'; Michelsen 19'; Tugaga 28'
Penalties
Davey (penalty shoot-out scored); Moroni (penalty shoot-out scored); McCaw (penalty shoot-out missed); Gloyn (penalty shoot-out missed)	2–0	(penalty shoot-out missed) Taseska; (penalty shoot-out missed) Evans; (penalty shoot-out missed) Crum; (penalty shoot-out missed) Michelsen

Umpires:
Amber Church (NZL)
Katrina Turner (NZL)

15 September 2019
17:45

Central ––	2–1	–– Capital
Willocks 17'; Cotter 34'	Report	MacAdre 6'

Umpires:
Kelly Hudson (NZL)
Kirsten Stuckey (NZL)

16 September 2019
17:30

Capital ––	0–3	–– Northland
	Report	Hager 9'; Gunson 46', 56'

Umpires:
Lani Jackman (AUS)
Joanne Cumming (NZL)

16 September 2019
19:30

Central ––	1–1	–– Midlands
Cotter 2'	Report	Tanner 21'
Penalties
Ralph (penalty shoot-out scored); Shannon (penalty shoot-out scored); Curtis (penalty shoot-out scored); Norman (penalty shoot-out missed)	3–2	(penalty shoot-out missed) Tanner; (penalty shoot-out scored) Moroni; (penalty shoot-out missed) McCaw; (penalty shoot-out scored) Gloyn; (penalty shoot-out missed) Brill

Umpires:
Kelly Hudson (NZL)
Lucy Lawlor (NZL)

=== Second round ===
==== Pool C (Medal Round) ====
Pos	Team	Pld	W	WD	LD	L	PF	PA	PD	Pts
1	–– North Harbour	3	2	0	0	1	4	2	+2	8
2	–– Northland	3	2	0	0	1	7	6	+1	8
3	–– Canterbury	3	2	0	0	1	5	5	0	8
4	–– Central	3	0	0	0	3	2	5	−3	0

First match(es) will be played: 18 September 2019. Source: Hockey NZ

18 September 2019
15:30

Northland ––	1–3	–– North Harbour
Taseska 60'	Report	Robinson 45'; Goad 49'; Pearce 60'

Umpires:
Amber Church (NZL)
Rachel Murphy (NZL)

18 September 2019
15:45

Canterbury ––	2–1	–– Central
Wium 9'; Wang 51'	Report	Curtis 44'

Umpires:
Lani Jackman (NZL)
Lucy Lawlor (NZL)

19 September 2019
15:30

North Harbour ––	1–0	–– Central
Dickins 50'	Report

Umpires:
Katrina Turner (NZL)
Lucy Lawlor (NZL)

19 September 2019
15:45

Canterbury ––	2–4	–– Northland
Wang 11', 52'	Report	Michelsen 16'; Neal 37', 42'; Pilmer 60'

Umpires:
Kelly Hudson (NZL)
Lani Jackman (NZL)

21 September 2019
12:00

Canterbury ––	1–0	–– North Harbour
Cocks 18'	Report

Umpires:
Kelly Hudson (NZL)
Katrina Turner (NZL)

21 September 2019
12:15

Northland ––	2–1	–– Central
Pilmer 3'; Michelsen 38'	Report	Ralph 25'

Umpires:
Amber Church (NZL)
Lani Jackman (NZL)

==== Pool D (Classification Round) ====
Pos	Team	Pld	W	WD	LD	L	PF	PA	PD	Pts
1	–– Midlands	3	3	0	0	0	17	0	+17	12
2	–– Auckland	3	2	0	0	1	6	9	−3	8
3	–– Capital	3	1	0	0	2	5	7	−2	4
4	–– Southern	3	0	0	0	3	2	14	−12	0

First match(es) will be played: 18 September 2019. Source: Hockey NZ

18 September 2019
13:30

Auckland ––	3–2	–– Capital
Lench 8'; White 28'; Thompson 56'	Report	MacAdre 30'; Hudson 44'

Umpires:
Kelly Hudson (NZL)
Kirsten Stuckey (NZL)

18 September 2019
13:45

Midlands ––	8–0	–– Southern
Gloyn 4'; Charlton 15'; Robinson 30+', 31'; Moroni 34', 45'; Davey 50'; McCaw 60'	Report

Umpires:
Katrina Turner (NZL)
Joanne Cumming (NZL)

19 September 2019
13:30

Southern ––	0–3	–– Capital
	Report	Hull 34'; MacAdre 44'; Karringten 59'

Umpires:
Kirsten Stuckey (NZL)
Rachel Murphy (NZL)

19 September 2019
13:45

Auckland ––	0–5	–– Midlands
	Report	McCaw 13', 17', 35', 41'; Charlton 15'

Umpires:
Amber Church (NZL)
Joanne Cumming (NZL)

21 September 2019
08:00

Midlands ––	4–0	–– Capital
Gloyn 2', 49'; Moroni 3'; McCaw 60'	Report

Umpires:
Lucy Lawlor (NZL)
Rachel Murphy (NZL)

21 September 2019
14:15

Auckland ––	3–2	–– Southern
King 34'; Thompson 42'; Ritchie 59'	Report	Eddie 26'; Duncan 50'

Umpires:
Kirsten Stuckey (NZL)
Joanne Cumming (NZL)

=== Classification ===
==== Seventh and eighth place ====
22 September 2019
08:00

Capital ––	3–1	–– Southern
Hull 4'; Reidy 11', 23'	Report	Turner 21'

Umpires:
Kirsten Stuckey (NZL)
Katrina Turner (NZL)

==== Fifth and sixth place ====
22 September 2019
10:15

Midlands ––	3–2	–– Auckland
Moroni 6'; Brill 43', 57'	Report	Thompson 19'; Tynan 26'

Umpires:
Joanne Cumming (NZL)
Rachel Murphy (NZL)

==== Third and fourth place ====
22 September 2019
10:00

Canterbury ––	2–1	–– Central
Shirley 30'; Wang 54'	Report	Whitelock 60'

Umpires:
Lani Jackman (NZL)
Lucy Lawlor (NZL)

==== Final ====
22 September 2019
14:00

North Harbour ––	2–0	–– Northland
Dickins 4', 10'	Report

Umpires:
Amber Church (NZL)
Kelly Hudson (NZL)

== Statistics ==
=== Final standings ===
Pos	Team	Pld	W	WD	LD	L	PF	PA	PD	Pts	Final Result
1st place, gold medalist(s)	–– North Harbour	7	5	0	0	2	13	6	+7	20	Gold Medal
2nd place, silver medalist(s)	–– Northland	7	3	1	1	2	15	13	+2	15	Silver Medal
3rd place, bronze medalist(s)	–– Canterbury	7	5	0	0	2	14	10	+4	20	Bronze Medal
4	–– Central	7	1	1	1	4	8	11	−3	7	
5	–– Midlands	7	5	1	1	0	25	6	+19	23	
6	–– Auckland	7	4	0	0	3	15	18	−3	16	
7	–– Capital	7	2	0	0	5	9	14	−5	8	
8	–– Southern	7	0	0	0	7	4	25	−21	0	

Source: Hockey NZ

=== Goalscorers ===
There were 103 goals scored in 28 matches, for an average of 3.68 goals per match.

8 goals

- –– Gemma McCaw

5 goals

- –– Emily Wium

4 goals

- –– Brittany Wang
- –– Agueda Moroni
- –– Stacey Michelsen
- –– Stephanie Dickins

3 goals

- –– Tyler Lench
- –– Deanna Ritchie
- –– Elizabeth Thompson
- –– Estelle MacAdre
- –– Natasha Brill
- –– Shiloh Gloyn
- –– Brooke Neal
- –– Tori Robinson

2 goals

- –– Madison Doar
- –– Rose Tynan
- –– Megan Hull
- –– Felicity Reidy
- –– Kaitlin Cotter
- –– Hope Ralph
- –– Samantha Charlton
- –– Amy Robinson
- –– Elizabeth Gunson
- –– Jess Pilmer
- –– Samantha Polovnikoff
- –– Ellie Duncan

1 goal

- –– Julia King
- –– Tayla White
- –– Sophie Cocks
- –– Hayley Cox
- –– Lydia Shirley
- –– Catherine Tinning
- –– Margot Willis
- –– Anahira Hudson
- –– Caashia Karringten
- –– Michaela Curtis
- –– Pippa Norman
- –– Kayla Whitelock
- –– Anna Willocks
- –– Tarryn Davey
- –– Georgia Morton
- –– Kim Tanner
- –– Naomi Evans
- –– Teegan Hager
- –– Tina Taseska
- –– Samaria Tugaga
- –– Erin Goad
- –– Julia Gomes Fantasia
- –– Kirsten Pearce
- –– Lucía Sanguinetti
- –– Brooke Eddie
- –– Lucy Turner

Source: Hockey NZ
