= 2025 Men's Premier Hockey League =

Hockey New Zealand's national league, third season

Tournament details
- Host country: New Zealand
- Dates: 8 November – 13 December
- Teams: 4
- Venue: 8 (in 7 host cities)

Final positions
- Champions: Southern Alpiners (2nd title)
- Runner-up: Hauraki Mavericks
- Third place: Central Falcons

Tournament statistics
- Matches played: 14
- Goals scored: 92 (6.57 per match)
- Top scorer: Samuel Lane (SA) (9 goals)

The 2025 Men's Premier Hockey League was the third season of New Zealand's national league. The tournament was held across seven cities of New Zealand, culminating with finals at Lloyd Elsmore Park in Auckland. Competition commenced on 8 November and culminated with finals matches on 13 December.

== Competition format ==
=== Format ===
The 2025 Premier Hockey League will follow the same format of the previous season. Teams will play in a double round-robin format during the Pool Stage, followed by two Classification Matches. Following the results of the Pool Stage, the top two ranked teams will contest the final, while the bottom two ranked teams will play off for third place.

=== Point allocation ===
Match points will be distributed as follows:

- 4 points: win
- 2 points: shoot-out win
- 1 points: shoot-out loss
- 0 points: loss

== Participating teams ==
The four teams competing in the league come from the various regions of New Zealand.

Central Falcons (CF)

Head Coach: Joe Hanks

1. Max Ruffell (GK)
2. Luke Elmes (GK)
3. William Zhou (GK)
5. Harison Clulow
8. Timothy Crawford
10. Jordan Cohen
11. Oliver Bowmar
12. Harrison Withers
15. Maxwell Rasmussen
16. Leopald Harms
18. Graeme Murrell
19. Patrick Madder
20. Dylan Thomas (C)
21. Finlay Neale
22. Jacob Smith
24. Samuel Hiha
26. Sean Findlay
27. Sajan Patel
28. Javahn Jones
29. Oscar Nation
30. Matthew Wilson
31. Bradley Read
35. Dane Lett
37. Hayden Phillips
38. Charlie Swan
Hauraki Mavericks (HM)

Head Coach: Samuel Bartholomew

5. Quinn Harris
7. Bradley Coxon
8. Timothy Neild
9. Louis Ridge
10. Luke Aldred
11. Malcolm Curley
12. Bradley Rothwell
13. Paul Dösch
16. Joshua McCaul
17. Bennet Ness
18. Nicholas Woods (C)
19. Cameron Hayde
19. Dylan Muggleston
20. Aidan Sarikaya
21. Dean Clarkson
22. Te Hiraka Chase
23. Jordan Whittleston
24. Ashton Carter
25. Timothy Greenwood
26. Aiden Bax
27. Vance Harvey
28. Brylie Adams
29. Owen Brown
30. Björn Szerdahelyi
57. Richard Reutsch (GK)
59. Matthew Reutsch (GK)
62. Felix McIntosh (GK)
Northern Tridents (NT)

Head Coach: (South Africa) Jude Menezes

1. Ryan Parr
2. Charl Ulrich
3. Robert Capizzi
4. Milan Patel
5. Scott Illerbrun
6. Aiden Fraser
7. Brett Menezes
7. Scott Cosslett
8. Steven Lydiard
9. Maks Wyndham-Smith
10. Matthew Simonds
11. Mitchell Murray
12. George Muir
14. Liam Mortimer
16. Julian Talavou
17. Isaac Houlbrooke
18. Hayden Ganley (GK)
19. Angus Griffin (GK)
20. James Stables
21. Luke Holmes
22. James Hickson
23. Luka Clark
24. Zander Fraser
26. Seth Irons
27. Rocco Ludolph
34. Reagan Harnell (GK)
Southern Alpiners (SA)

Head Coach: Joe Piggott, Blair Tarrant

2. George Baker
3. Daniel Torr
4. Nicholas Lidstone
5. Nicholas Stephenson
6. Ryan Caldwell
7. Finn Ward
8. Charlie Morrison
9. Patrick Ward
10. Jonathan Thorn
11. Malachi Buschl
12. Samuel Lane (C)
13. Nicholas Haig
13. Simon Yorston
14. Zeke Buschl
15. Joshua Irwin
16. Moss Jackson
18. Samuel Lints
19. Joseph Morrison
20. Nicholas Findlay
21. Kane Russell
22. Gus Nelson
23. Jakarta Klebert
23. Benjamin Culhane
24. Thomas Meder
25. Baxter Mason
33. Hugh Nixon (GK)
33. George Enerson (GK)
34. Louis Beckert (GK)

== Venues ==
Auckland
Lloyd Elsmore Park
National Hockey Centre
Christchurch
Nunweek Park
Dunedin
Alexander McMillan Hockey Centre
Hamilton
Gallagher Hockey Centre
Napier
Park Island Recreation Ground
Wellington
National Hockey Stadium
Whangārei
ITM Hockey Centre

== Results ==
All times are local (New Zealand Daylight Time).

=== Preliminary round ===
==== Standings ====
| Pos | Team | Pld | W | WD | LD | L | GF | GA | GD | Pts | Qualification |
|---|---|---|---|---|---|---|---|---|---|---|---|
| 1 | Hauraki Mavericks | 6 | 5 | 0 | 0 | 1 | 25 | 14 | +11 | 20 | Advanced to Final |
| 2 | Southern Alpiners | 6 | 4 | 1 | 0 | 1 | 17 | 12 | +5 | 18 | Advanced to Final |
| 3 | Northern Tridents | 6 | 2 | 0 | 0 | 4 | 26 | 24 | +2 | 8 | |
| 4 | Central Falcons | 6 | 0 | 0 | 1 | 5 | 10 | 28 | −18 | 1 | |

Source: Hockey New Zealand
Rules for classification: 1) points; 2) matches won; 3) goal difference; 4) goals for; 5) head-to-head result; 6) field goals scored.

==== Fixtures ====
8 November 2024
19:30

| Central Falcons | 4–6 | Hauraki Mavericks |
|---|---|---|
| Hiha 33', 33'; Nation 45', 45' | Report | Bax 19'; Brown 27'; Ridge 41', 41'; Whittleston 46', 46' |

Park Island Recreation Ground, Napier
Umpires:
Lee Erskine (NZL)
Bevan Nichol (NZL)

9 November 2024
15:00

| Southern Alpiners | 3–2 | Northern Tridents |
|---|---|---|
| Baker 27', 27'; Lane 38' | Report | Mortimer 19', 29' |

Alexander McMillan Hockey Centre, Dunedin
Umpires:
Benjamin Grant (NZL)
Nicholas Saunders (NZL)

15 November 2024
13:00

| Hauraki Mavericks | 1–4 | Southern Alpiners |
|---|---|---|
| Whittleston 53' | Report | P. Ward 38'; Baker 41', 41'; F. Ward 58' |

Gallagher Hockey Centre, Hamilton
Umpires:
Timothy Bond (NZL)
Ryan Potter (NZL)

15 November 2024
14:00

| Northern Tridents | 9–0 | Central Falcons |
|---|---|---|
| Ulrich 33', 53'; Stables 38', 38'; Capizzi 42', 42'; Z. Fraser 50'; Mortimer 57', 57' | Report |

National Hockey Centre, Auckland
Umpires:
Bevan Nichol (NZL)
Benjamin Grant (NZL)

16 November 2024
12:30

| Northern Tridents | 3–5 | Southern Alpiners |
|---|---|---|
| Holmes 15'; A. Fraser 20'; Stables 26' | Report | Lane 5', 22', 22', 41', 41' |

Lloyd Elsmore Park, Auckland
Umpires:
Bevan Nichol (NZL)
Anton Paulin (NZL)

16 November 2024
13:00

| Hauraki Mavericks | 2–0 | Central Falcons |
|---|---|---|
| Dösch 48', 48' | Report |

Gallagher Hockey Centre, Hamilton
Umpires:
Timothy Bond (NZL)
Benjamin Grant (NZL)

22 November 2024
15:00

| Northern Tridents | 3–8 | Hauraki Mavericks |
|---|---|---|
| A. Fraser 2', 2'; Capizzi 28' | Report | Aldred 8'; Coxon 12', 13'; Woods 30'; Whittleston 48', 48'; Brown 51', 51' |

ITM Hockey Centre, Whangārei
Umpires:
Timothy Bond (NZL)
Anton Paulin (NZL)

22 November 2024
15:30

| Southern Alpiners | 2–2 | Central Falcons |
|---|---|---|
| Lints 15', 15' | Report | Smith 18'; Jones 30+' |
Penalties
| Lints (penalty shoot-out missed); Irwin (penalty shoot-out missed); P. Ward (penalty shoot-out scored); Jackson (penalty shoot-out scored); Nelson (penalty shoot-out scored) | 3–1 | (penalty shoot-out missed) Harms; (penalty shoot-out scored) Smith; (penalty shoot-out missed) Madder; (penalty shoot-out missed) Clulow |

Nunweek Park, Christchurch
Umpires:
Gareth Greenfield (NZL)
Nicholas Saunders (NZL)

6 December 2024
15:00

| Hauraki Mavericks | 6–3 | Northern Tridents |
|---|---|---|
| Woods 6', 32'; Hayde 44', 44'; Coxon 59', 60' | Report | Hickson 12', 12', 18' |

Gallagher Hockey Centre, Hamilton
Umpires:
Lee Erskine (NZL)
Michael Marychurch (NZL)

6 December 2024
16:00

| Central Falcons | 2–3 | Southern Alpiners |
|---|---|---|
| Thomas 50', 50' | Report | Caldwell 8', 36'; Jackson 36' |

National Hockey Stadium, Wellington
Umpires:
David Tomlinson (NZL)
Anton Paulin (NZL)

7 December 2024
15:00

| Central Falcons | 2–6 | Northern Tridents |
|---|---|---|
| Patel 57', 57' | Report | Murray 6'; Z. Fraser 13', 33', 33'; Capizzi 48'; Mortimer 55' |

National Hockey Stadium, Wellington
Umpires:
Ryan Potter (NZL)
Anton Paulin (NZL)

7 December 2024
16:00

| Southern Alpiners | 0–2 | Hauraki Mavericks |
|---|---|---|
| | Report | McCaul 34'; Carter 49' |

Nunweek Park, Christchurch
Umpires:
Gareth Greenfield (NZL)
Nicholas Saunders (NZL)

=== Classification round ===
==== Third and fourth place ====
12 December 2024
19:30

| Northern Tridents | 3–5 | Central Falcons |
|---|---|---|
| Wyndham-Smith 41'; Houlbrooke 55', 55' | Report | Thomas 13', 13'; Patel 36'; Bowmar 51', 51' |

Lloyd Elsmore Park, Auckland
Umpires:
Timothy Bond (NZL)
Lee Erskine (NZL)

==== Final ====
13 December 2024
14:00

| Hauraki Mavericks | 1–5 | Southern Alpiners |
|---|---|---|
| Aldred 36' | Report | P. Ward 36', 36'; Lane 47', 47', 57' |

Lloyd Elsmore Park, Auckland
Umpires:
Gareth Greenfield (NZL)
Benjamin Grant (NZL)

== Final standings ==
| Pos | Team | Pld | W | WD | LD | L | GF | GA | GD | Pts |
|---|---|---|---|---|---|---|---|---|---|---|
| 1st place, gold medalist(s) | Southern Alpiners | 7 | 5 | 1 | 0 | 1 | 22 | 13 | +9 | 22 |
| 2nd place, silver medalist(s) | Hauraki Mavericks | 7 | 5 | 0 | 0 | 2 | 26 | 19 | +7 | 20 |
| 3rd place, bronze medalist(s) | Central Falcons | 7 | 1 | 0 | 1 | 5 | 15 | 31 | −16 | 5 |
| 4 | Northern Tridents | 7 | 2 | 0 | 0 | 5 | 29 | 29 | 0 | 8 |

Source: Hockey New Zealand

== Goalscorers ==
There were 92 goals scored in 14 matches, for an average of 6.57 goals per match.

9 goals

- Samuel Lane (SA)

5 goals

- Jordan Whittleston (HM)
- Liam Mortimer (NT)

4 goals

- Dylan Thomas (CF)
- Bradley Coxon (HM)
- Robert Capizzi (NT)
- Zander Fraser (NT)
- George Baker (SA)

3 goals

- Sajan Patel (CF)
- Owen Brown (HM)
- Nicholas Woods (HM)
- Aiden Fraser (NT)
- James Hickson (NT)
- James Stables (NT)
- Patrick Ward (SA)

2 goals

- Oliver Bowmar (CF)
- Samuel Hiha (CF)
- Oscar Nation (CF)
- Luke Aldred (HM)
- Paul Dösch (HM)
- Cameron Hayde (HM)
- Louis Ridge (HM)
- Isaac Houlbrooke (NT)
- Charl Ulrich (NT)
- Ryan Caldwell (SA)
- Samuel Lints (SA)

1 goal

- Javahn Jones (CF)
- Jacob Smith (CF)
- Aiden Bax (HM)
- Ashton Carter (HM)
- Joshua McCaul (HM)
- Luke Holmes (NT)
- Mitchell Murray (NT)
- Maks Wyndham-Smith (NT)
- Moss Jackson (SA)
- Finn Ward (SA)

Source: Hockey New Zealand
