= 2020 Women's Premier Hockey League =

Hockey New Zealand's national league, inaugural season

Tournament details
- Host country: New Zealand
- City: Hamilton
- Dates: 12–29 November
- Teams: 4
- Venue: Gallagher Hockey Centre

Final positions
- Champions: –– Central Falcons (1st title)
- Runner-up: –– Northern Tridents
- Third place: –– Hauraki Mavericks

Tournament statistics
- Matches played: 14
- Goals scored: 48 (3.43 per match)
- Top scorer: –– Stacey Michelsen (5 goals)
- Best player: –– Stacey Michelsen

The 2020 Women's Sentinel Homes Premier Hockey League was the inaugural women's edition of Hockey New Zealand's national league. The tournament was held in Hamilton at the Gallagher Hockey Centre. Competition commenced on 12 November, culminating with finals matches on 29 November.

The Central Falcons won the tournament after defeating the Northern Tridents 3–1 in the final. The Hauraki Mavericks finished in bronze position, defeating the Southern Alpiners 1–0.

== Competition format ==
=== Format ===
The 2020 Premier Hockey League saw a new format than that of the former, National Hockey League. Teams played in a double round-robin format during the Pool Stage, which was followed by two Classification Matches.

Following the results of the Pool Stage, the top two ranked teams contested the final, with the bottom two ranked teams playing off for third place.

=== Point allocation ===
Match points will be distributed as follows:

- 4 points: win
- 2 points: shoot-out win
- 1 points: shoot-out loss
- 0 points: loss

== Participating teams ==
The four teams competing in the league come from the various regions of New Zealand.

- –– Central Falcons
- –– Hauraki Mavericks
- –– Northern Tridents
- –– Southern Alpiners

== Results ==
All times are local (New Zealand Daylight Time).

=== Preliminary round ===
Pos	Team	Pld	W	WD	LD	L	GF	GA	GD	Pts	Qualification
1	–– Central Falcons	6	4	0	2	0	13	7	+6	18	Advanced to Final
2	–– Northern Tridents	6	3	1	0	2	15	9	+6	14	Advanced to Final
3	–– Hauraki Mavericks	6	2	1	0	3	7	12	−5	10	
4	–– Southern Alpiners	6	1	0	0	5	8	15	−7	4	

Source: Hockey New Zealand
Rules for classification: 1) points; 2) matches won; 3) goal difference; 4) goals for; 5) head-to-head result; 6) field goals scored.

==== Fixtures ====
12 November 2020
17:00

Northern Tridents ––	5–0	–– Hauraki Mavericks
Michelsen 14', 44'; Ivory 37'; Hildesley 45'; Tynan 59'	Report

Umpires:
Mallory Barnett (NZL)
Kirsten Stuckey (NZL)

12 November 2020
19:00

Central Falcons ––	4–1	–– Southern Alpiners
Shannon 5'; Ralph 9', 26'; Hull 10'	Report	Merry 22'

Umpires:
Lani Jackman (NZL)
Kelly-Anne Foskin (NZL)

14 November 2020
12:00

Northern Tridents ––	2–2	–– Central Falcons
Dickins 17'; Tynan 20'	Report	Kelly 40'; Curtis 56'
Penalties
Doar (penalty shoot-out missed); Dickins (penalty shoot-out missed); Tynan (penalty shoot-out scored) —— Tynan (penalty shoot-out scored)	2–1	(penalty shoot-out missed) Shannon; (penalty shoot-out missed) Baker; (penalty shoot-out scored) Ralph —— (penalty shoot-out missed) Ralph

Umpires:
Kelly-Anne Foskin (NZL)
Kirsten Stuckey (NZL)

14 November 2020
14:00

Southern Alpiners ––	2–3	–– Hauraki Mavericks
Ambrosius 24'; Merry 27'	Report	King 33'; Hunt 37'; Jaques 55'

Umpires:
Lani Jackman (NZL)
Mallory Barnett (NZL)

15 November 2020
12:00

Southern Alpiners ––	1–4	–– Northern Tridents
Merry 15'	Report	Ivory 17'; Pearce 30', 36'; Tynan 55'

Umpires:
Kelly-Anne Foskin (NZL)
Mallory Barnett (NZL)

15 November 2020
14:00

Hauraki Mavericks ––	1–1	–– Central Falcons
Jaques 34'	Report	Ralph 56'
Penalties
Thompson (penalty shoot-out scored); King (penalty shoot-out scored); Jaques (penalty shoot-out missed) —— Thompson (penalty shoot-out scored)	3–2	(penalty shoot-out scored) Shannon; (penalty shoot-out scored) Whitelock; (penalty shoot-out missed) Hull —— (penalty shoot-out missed) Whitelock

Umpires:
Kirsten Stuckey (NZL)
Lani Jackman (NZL)

25 November 2020
17:00

Central Falcons ––	2–1	–– Northern Tridents
Shannon 30'; Cotter 59'	Report	Michelsen 37'

Umpires:
Amber Church (NZL)
Kelly-Anne Foskin (NZL)

25 November 2020
19:00

Hauraki Mavericks ––	1–0	–– Southern Alpiners
Thompson 31'	Report

Umpires:
Kelly Hudson (NZL)
Rachel Murphy (NZL)

26 November 2020
17:00

Southern Alpiners ––	1–2	–– Central Falcons
Willis 23'	Report	Ralph 43'; Shannon 47'

Umpires:
Rachel Murphy (NZL)
Amber Church (NZL)

26 November 2020
19:00

Hauraki Mavericks ––	1–2	–– Northern Tridents
T. Robinson 26'	Report	Michelsen 6', 57'

Umpires:
Lani Jackman (NZL)
Kelly Hudson (NZL)

28 November 2020
12:00

Northern Tridents ––	1–3	–– Southern Alpiners
Lench 21'	Report	Merry 7'; Ambrosius 27'; Wium 57'

Umpires:
Amber Church (NZL)
Lani Jackman (NZL)

28 November 2020
14:00

Central Falcons ––	2–1	–– Hauraki Mavericks
Shannon 48'; Reidy 53'	Report	A. Robinson 20'

Umpires:
Kelly-Anne Foskin (NZL)
Rachel Murphy (NZL)

=== Classification round ===
==== Third and fourth place ====
29 November 2020
12:00

Hauraki Mavericks ––	1–0	–– Southern Alpiners
Tuilotolava 58'	Report

Umpires:
Kelly Hudson (NZL)
Kelly-Anne Foskin (NZL)

==== Final ====
29 November 2020
14:00

Central Falcons ––	3–1	–– Northern Tridents
McIntyre 7'; Whitelock 24'; Curtis 27'	Report	Pearce 18'

Umpires:
Amber Church (NZL)
Lani Jackman (NZL)

== Awards ==
Player of the Tournament	Top Goalscorer
–– Stacey Michelsen	–– Stacey Michelsen

== Statistics ==
=== Final standings ===
Pos	Team	Pld	W	WD	LD	L	GF	GA	GD	Pts	Final standing
1st place, gold medalist(s)	–– Central Falcons	7	5	0	2	0	16	8	+8	22	Gold Medal
2nd place, silver medalist(s)	–– Northern Tridents	7	3	1	0	3	16	12	+4	14	Silver Medal
3rd place, bronze medalist(s)	–– Hauraki Mavericks	7	3	1	0	3	8	12	−4	14	Bronze Medal
4	–– Southern Alpiners	7	1	0	0	6	8	16	−8	4	Fourth Place

Source: Hockey New Zealand

=== Goalscorers ===
There were 48 goals scored in 14 matches, for an average of 3.43 goals per match.

5 goals

- –– Stacey Michelsen

4 goals

- –– Hope Ralph
- –– Olivia Shannon
- –– Olivia Merry

3 goals

- –– Kirsten Pearce
- –– Rose Tynan

2 goals

- –– Michaela Curtis
- –– Alia Jaques
- –– Kate Ivory
- –– Isabella Ambrosius

1 goal

- –– Kaitlin Cotter
- –– Megan Hull
- –– Jessica Kelly
- –– Jenna-Rae McIntyre
- –– Felicity Reidy
- –– Kayla Whitelock
- –– Alison Hunt
- –– Julia King
- –– Amy Robinson
- –– Tori Robinson
- –– Elizabeth Thompson
- –– Louisa Tuilotolava
- –– Stephanie Dickins
- –– Sophie Hildesley
- –– Tyler Lench
- –– Margot Willis
- –– Emily Wium

Source: Hockey New Zealand
