= 2022 Women's Trans-Tasman Hockey Series =

International field hockey competition

2022 Women's Trans–Tasman Hockey Series
Tournament details
- City: Auckland, New Zealand
- Dates: 10–15 May
- Teams: 2 (from 1 confederation)
- Venue: National Hockey Centre

Final positions
- Champions: Australia
- Runner-up: New Zealand

Tournament statistics
- Matches played: 4
- Goals scored: 12 (3 per match)
- Top scorer: (Australia) Brooke Peris (3 goals)

The 2022 Trans–Tasman Hockey Series was a women's field hockey series, comprising four test matches between the national teams of Australia and New Zealand. The series was held at the National Hockey Centre in Auckland, from 10 to 15 May.

Due to the ongoing impacts of the COVID-19 pandemic, the series was the first time the two teams played an international match since August 2021, in their respective matches at Olympic Games. The series was scheduled to be held alongside the men's event, however this was postponed due to COVID related issues.

== Squads ==
Australia

Head coach: Katrina Powell

1. Claire Colwill
2. Ambrosia Malone
3. Brooke Peris (C)
4. Amy Lawton
6. Penny Squibb
7. Aleisha Power (GK)
8. Georgia Wilson
9. Shanea Tonkin
10. Madison Fitzpatrick
11. Meg Pearce
12. Greta Hayes
13. Harriet Shand
14. Stephanie Kershaw
15. Kaitlin Nobbs
16. Courtney Schonell
18. Jane Claxton
19. Jocelyn Bartram (GK)
20. Karri Somerville
21. Renee Taylor
24. Mariah Williams
28. Hannah Cullum-Sanders
29. Rebecca Greiner
30. Grace Stewart
New Zealand

Head coach: Darren Smith

2. Olivia Shannon
3. Alexandra Lukin
4. Olivia Merry (C)
6. Hope Ralph
7. Aniwaka Roberts
9. Ella Hyatt Brown
11. Casey Crowley
14. Tyler Lench
15. Grace O'Hanlon (GK)
17. Stephanie Dickins
18. Anna Crowley
19. Tessa Jopp
20. Megan Hull (C)
21. Alia Jaques
22. Katie Doar
23. Deanna Ritchie
26. Kaitlin Cotter
27. Holly Pearson
29. Madison Doar
32. Rose Tynan
34. Tayla White
35. Kirsten Nation (GK)

== Results ==
All times are local (NZST).

=== Standings ===
Pos	Team	Pld	W	D	L	GF	GA	GD	Pts
1	Australia	4	2	2	0	7	5	+2	8
2	New Zealand (H)	4	0	2	2	5	7	−2	2

Source: Hockey New Zealand
Rules for classification: 1) points; 2) goal difference; 3) games won; 4) head-to-head result.
(H) Hosts

=== Fixtures ===
10 May 2022
19:05

New Zealand	2–2	Australia
Tynan 16'; Shannon 42'	Report	Fitzpatrick 47'; Williams 48'

Umpires:
Amber Church (NZL)
Rhiannon Murrie (AUS)

12 May 2022
19:05

New Zealand	1–2	Australia
Shannon 39'	Report	Peris 13', 57'

Umpires:
Kelly Hudson (NZL)
Amber Church (NZL)

14 May 2022
15:35

New Zealand	1–1	Australia
Jaques 6'	Report	Tonkin 30'

Umpires:
Rhiannon Murrie (AUS)
Amber Church (NZL)

15 May 2022
15:35

New Zealand	1–2	Australia
Hull 14'	Report	Greiner 23'; Peris 34'

Umpires:
Amber Church (NZL)
Kelly Hudson (NZL)

== Goalscorers ==
There were 12 goals scored in 4 matches, for an average of 3 goals per match.

3 goals

- (Australia) Brooke Peris

2 goals

- (New Zealand) Olivia Shannon

1 goal

- (Australia) Madison Fitzpatrick
- (Australia) Rebecca Greiner
- (Australia) Shanea Tonkin
- (Australia) Mariah Williams
- (New Zealand) Megan Hull
- (New Zealand) Alia Jaques
- (New Zealand) Rose Tynan

Source: FIH
