= 2025 Women's Oceania Cup =

Field hockey tournament

Tournament details
- Host country: Australia
- City: Darwin
- Dates: 4–7 September
- Teams: 2 (from 1 confederation)
- Venue: MWT Hockey Centre

Final positions
- Champions: New Zealand (5th title)
- Runner-up: Australia

Tournament statistics
- Matches played: 3
- Goals scored: 4 (1.33 per match)
- Top scorer: four players (1 goals)

The 2025 Women's Oceania Cup was the thirteenth edition of the Women's Oceania Cup, the biennial international women's field hockey championship of Oceania organised by the Oceania Hockey Federation. It was held from 4 to 7 September 2025, at the MWT Hockey Centre in Darwin.

The event consisted of a three match series between defending champions and series hosts, Australia, and New Zealand. The winner of the tournament gained direct qualification to the 2026 FIH World Cup.

New Zealand won their fifth title, defeating defending champions Australia 5–3 on penalties after the series finished tied.

== Teams ==
Australia

Head Coach: Katrina Powell

1. Claire Colwill (C)
3. Morgan Mathison
4. Amy Lawton
5. Grace Young
7. Aleisha Power (GK)
10. Abigail Wilson
11. Alice Arnott
12. Greta Hayes
13. Harriet Shand
15. Kaitlin Nobbs (C)
16. Courtney Schonell
17. Lucy Sharman
18. Alana Kavanagh
20. Karri Somerville
22. Tatum Stewart
24. Mariah Williams
25. Zoe Newman (GK)
30. Grace Stewart (C)
New Zealand

Head Coach: Philip Burrows

2. Olivia Shannon (C)
3. Ella Hyatt Brown
6. Hope Ralph
8. Hannah Cotter
11. Casey Crowley
13. Josephine Murray
15. Grace O'Hanlon (GK)
18. Anna Crowley
19. Tessa Jopp
23. Jessica Anderson
26. Kaitlin Cotter
27. Holly Pearson
28. Hannah Gravenall
31. Riana Pho
34. Julia Gluyas (GK)
37. Emma Findlay
38. Brittany Wang
43. Emma Rainey

== Results ==
All times are local (UTC+09:30).

=== Standings ===
Pos	Team	Pld	W	D	L	GF	GA	GD	Pts	Qualification
1	New Zealand (C)	3	1	1	1	2	2	0	4	2026 FIH World Cup
2	Australia (H)	3	1	1	1	2	2	0	4	2026 FIH World Cup Qualifiers

Source: FIH
Rules for classification: 1) points; 2) matches won; 3) goal difference; 4) goals for; 5) head-to-head result; 6) field goals for.
(C) Champions; (H) Hosts

=== Fixtures ===
4 September 2025
20:10

Australia	0–1	New Zealand
	Report	Shannon 49'

Umpires:
Kelly Hudson (NZL)
Kristy Robertson (AUS)

6 September 2025
14:10

Australia	1–0	New Zealand
Williams 56'	Report

Umpires:
Kelly Hudson (NZL)
Kristy Robertson (AUS)

7 September 2025
14:10

Australia	1–1	New Zealand
Mathison 29'	Report	Anderson 53'
Penalties
Arnott (penalty shoot-out missed); Hayes (penalty shoot-out scored); Williams (penalty shoot-out scored); Lawton (penalty shoot-out scored)	3–5	(penalty shoot-out scored) Shannon; (penalty shoot-out scored) H. Cotter; (penalty shoot-out scored) Pho; (penalty shoot-out scored) Murray; (penalty shoot-out scored) Shannon

Umpires:
Kelly Hudson (NZL)
Zeke Newman (AUS)

== Goalscorers ==
There were 4 goals scored in 3 matches, for an average of 1.33 goals per match.

1 goal

- (Australia) Morgan Mathison
- (Australia) Mariah Williams
- (New Zealand) Jessica Anderson
- (New Zealand) Olivia Shannon

Source: FIH

== See also ==
- 2025 Men's Oceania Cup
