= 2024 Men's Premier Hockey League =

Hockey New Zealand's national league, second season

Tournament details
- Host country: New Zealand
- Dates: 2 November – 7 December
- Teams: 4
- Venue: 9 (in 8 host cities)

Final positions
- Champions: Southern Alpiners (1st title)
- Runner-up: Central Falcons
- Third place: Northern Tridents

Tournament statistics
- Matches played: 14
- Goals scored: 106 (7.57 per match)
- Top scorer: Sam Lane (SA) (15 goals)

The 2024 Men's Premier Hockey League was the second season of New Zealand's national league. The tournament was held across nine cities in New Zealand, with the placement finals being contested at the North Harbour Hockey Centre in Auckland. The competition commenced on the 2nd of November, and the placement finals took place on the 7th of December.

Following a four-year hiatus, the league returned under new private ownership.

The reigning champions from the 2020 edition were the Central Falcons.

== Competition format ==
=== Format ===
The 2024 Premier Hockey League will follow the same format of the inaugural season. Teams will play in a double round-robin format during the Pool Stage, followed by two Classification Matches. Following the results of the Pool Stage, the top two ranked teams will contest the final, while the bottom two ranked teams will play off for third place.

=== Point allocation ===
Match points will be distributed as follows:

- 4 points: win
- 2 points: shoot-out win
- 1 points: shoot-out loss
- 0 points: loss

=== Conversion Goals ===
The 2024 edition featured a new Conversion Goal system. Following the scoring of a field goal, penalty corner goal, or a penalty stroke goal, the goal scorer takes the goalkeeper on in a one-on-one shootout. A successful conversion adds another goal to the score count.

== Participating teams ==
The four teams competing in the league come from the various regions of New Zealand.

Central Falcons (CF)

Head Coach: Graeme Findlay

1. Stephen Atkinson
2. Dean Clarkson
3. Jordan Cohen
4. Dom Dixon (GK)
5. Jonty Elmes
6. Sean Findlay (C)
7. Joe Hanks
8. Sam Hiha
9. Javahn Jones
10. Harrison Lawson
11. Patrick Madder
12. Graeme Murrell
13. Oscar Nation
14. Finlay Neale
15. Sajan Patel
16. Lachlan Paton
17. Maxwell Rasmussen
18. Dylan Thomas
19. Mackenzie Wilcox
20. Matthew Wilson
21. William Zhou (GK)
Hauraki Mavericks (HM)

Head Coach: (Australia) Brent Livermore

1. Luke Aldred
2. Brennan Alexander-Parker
3. Aiden Bax
4. Owen Brown
5. Marcus Child
6. Denym Clarke
7. Brad Coxon
8. Joe Crooks
9. Paul Dösch
10. Timothy Greenwood
11. Vance Harvey
12. Samuel Lowndes
13. Thomas Marchant
14. Joshua McCaul
15. Dylan Muggleston
16. Tim Neild
17. Bradley Rothwell
18. Matthew Rütsch (GK)
19. Aidan Sarikaya
20. Dylan Stevenson
21. Jordan Whittleston
22. Nic Woods (C)
23. Owen Brown
24. Denym Clarke
25. Tim Neild
26. Matthew van Aardt (GK)
Northern Tridents (NT)

Head Coach: Bryce Collins

1. Robbie Capizzi
2. Luka Clark
3. Scott Cosslett
4. James Coughlan
5. Aiden Fraser
6. Zander Fraser
7. Hayden Ganley (GK)
8. Angus Griffin (GK)
9. James Hickson
10. Luke Holmes
11. Isaac Houlbrooke
12. Rocco Ludolph
13. Liam Mortimer
14. Jared Panchia (C)
15. Milan Patel
16. Ryan Parr
17. Jayshaan Randhawa
18. Netesh Sukha
19. Charl Ulrich
20. Maks Wyndham-Smith
Southern Alpiners (SA)

Head Coach: Aaron Ford

1. George Baker
2. Louis Beckert (GK)
3. Malachi Buschl
4. Benji Culhane
5. Nick Findlay
6. Josh Irwin
7. Sam Lane (C)
8. Nicholas Lidstone
9. Sam Lints
10. Felix McIntosh (GK)
11. Charlie Morrison
12. Joseph Morrison
13. Gus Nelson
14. James Nicolson
15. Hugh Nixon (GK)
16. Kane Russell
17. Blair Tarrant
18. Daniel Torr
19. Finn Ward
20. Jordan Ward
21. Patrick Ward
22. Simon Yorston

== Venues ==
Auckland
Lloyd Elsmore Park
North Harbour Hockey Centre
Christchurch
Ngā Puna Wei Sports Hub
Dunedin
Alexander McMillan Hockey Centre
Hamilton
St Paul's Collegiate School
Mount Maunganui
Tauranga Hockey Association
Napier
Park Island Recreation Ground
Palmerston North
Massey University Hockey Turf
Wellington
National Hockey Centre

== Results ==
All times are local (New Zealand Daylight Time).

=== Preliminary round ===
Pos	Team	Pld	W	WD	LD	L	GF	GA	GD	Pts	Qualification
1	Southern Alpiners	6	5	0	1	0	29	8	+21	21	Advanced to Final
2	Central Falcons	6	2	2	0	2	24	27	−3	12	Advanced to Final
3	Northern Tridents	6	1	0	2	3	20	20	0	6	
4	Hauraki Mavericks	6	1	1	0	4	15	33	−18	6	

Updated to match(es) played on 10 November 2024. Source: Premier Hockey League
Rules for classification: 1) points; 2) matches won; 3) goal difference; 4) goals for; 5) head-to-head result; 6) field goals scored.

==== Fixtures ====
2 November 2024
16:00

Northern Tridents	2–2	Hauraki Mavericks
Capizzi 13'; Randhawa 45+'	Report	Harvey 28'; Coxon 35'
Penalties
Capizzi (penalty shoot-out missed); Holmes (penalty shoot-out scored); Wyndham-Smith (penalty shoot-out missed); Hickson (penalty shoot-out scored); Panchia (penalty shoot-out scored); Holmes (penalty shoot-out missed)	3–4	(penalty shoot-out scored) Alexander-Parker; (penalty shoot-out scored) Child; (penalty shoot-out scored) Dösch; (penalty shoot-out missed) Greenwood; (penalty shoot-out missed) Neild; (penalty shoot-out scored) Dösch

Lloyd Elsmore Park, Auckland
Umpires:
Gareth Greenfield (NZL)
David Tomlinson (NZL)

3 November 2024
11:00

Southern Alpiners	6–1	Central Falcons
Nicolson 17', 17'; Lane 19'; Findlay 38', 38'; F. Ward 39'	Report	Elmes 45'

Alexander McMillan Hockey Centre, Dunedin
Umpires:
Bevan Nichol (NZL)
Nicholas Saunders (NZL)

9 November 2024
16:00

Central Falcons	4–4	Northern Tridents
Lawson 6'; Thomas 7', 32'; Elmes 51'	Report	Holmes 20'; Wyndham-Smith 21', 22'; Mortimer 54'
Penalties
Elmes (penalty shoot-out scored); Wilson (penalty shoot-out scored); Thomas (penalty shoot-out scored); Hiha (penalty shoot-out scored); Nation (penalty shoot-out scored)	5–3	(penalty shoot-out scored) Capizzi; (penalty shoot-out missed) Houlbrooke; (penalty shoot-out scored) Mortimer; (penalty shoot-out scored) Hickson

Park Island Recreation Ground, Napier
Umpires:
Lee Erskine (NZL)
Amber Church (NZL)

10 November 2024
17:00

Southern Alpiners	4–1	Hauraki Mavericks
Baker 35', 35'; Findlay 42'; Lane 44'	Report	Aldred 40'

Ngā Puna Wei Sports Hub, Christchurch
Umpires:
Gareth Greenfield (NZL)
Katrina Turner (NZL)

16 November 2024
14:00

Central Falcons	3–3	Southern Alpiners
Thomas 41'; Nation 57', 58'	Report	Nicolson 20'; Baker 29'; Lints 33'
Penalties
	4–3

National Hockey Centre, Wellington
Umpires:
Gareth Greenfield (NZL)
David Tomlinson (NZL)

17 November 2024
13:00

Hauraki Mavericks	1–8	Northern Tridents
Dösch 51'	Report	Cosslett 3'; Hickson 7', 7', 60', 60'; Wyndham-Smith 14'; Mortimer 33', 33'

Tauranga Hockey Association, Mount Maunganui
Umpires:
Timothy Bond (NZL)
Bevan Nichol (NZL)

23 November 2024
14:00

Northern Tridents	3–4	Central Falcons
Ulrich 45+', 53', 53'	Report	Elmes 18', 18'; Thomas 41'; Madder 60'

North Harbour Hockey Centre, Auckland
Umpires:
Nicholas Saunders (NZL)
Lee Erskine (NZL)

23 November 2024
16:30

Hauraki Mavericks	0–7	Southern Alpiners
	Report	Baker 19'; Lane 31', 31', 57', 57'; Lints 57', 57'

St Paul's Collegiate School, Hamilton
Umpires:
Benjamin Grant (NZL)
Timothy Bond (NZL)

24 November 2024
13:00

Northern Tridents	2–6	Southern Alpiners
Capizzi 48', 48'	Report	Nicolson 8', 8'; Lane 42', 52', 52', 59'

North Harbour Hockey Centre, Auckland
Umpires:
Amber Church (NZL)
Bevan Nichol (NZL)

24 November 2024
13:30

Hauraki Mavericks	4–7	Central Falcons
Woods 38', 38'; Aldred 42'; Dösch 43'	Report	Thomas 2', 47', 54', 54'; Hiha 8', 8', 26'

St Paul's Collegiate School, Hamilton
Umpires:
Benjamin Grant (NZL)
Lee Erskine (NZL)

30 November 2024
16:00

Central Falcons	5–7	Hauraki Mavericks
Nation 8', 32'; Hiha 19', 19'; Thomas 32'	Report	Neild 15'; Brown 18', 18'; Lowndes 28'; Woods 44'; Aldred 60', 60'

Massey University Hockey Turf, Palmerston North
Umpires:
David Tomlinson (NZL)
Timothy Bond (NZL)

1 December 2024
15:00

Southern Alpiners	3–1	Northern Tridents
Lane 1'; Baker 59', 59'	Report	Houlbrooke 40'

Ngā Puna Wei Sports Hub, Christchurch
Umpires:
Benjamin Grant (NZL)
Gareth Greenfield (NZL)

=== Classification round ===
==== Third and fourth place ====
7 December 2024
13:15

Northern Tridents	4–3	Hauraki Mavericks
Ludolph 4'; Ulrich 15', 60', 60'	Report	Aldred 11'; Muggleston 44', 45'

North Harbour Hockey Centre, Auckland
Umpires:
Benjamin Grant (NZL)
Bevan Nichol (NZL)

==== Final ====
7 December 2024
17:15

Southern Alpiners	7–4	Central Falcons
Lane 3', 12', 57', 57'; Tarrant 45', 45'; Baker 45'	Report	Hiha 13'; Thomas 28', 28', 40'

North Harbour Hockey Centre, Auckland
Umpires:
Amber Church (NZL)
Gareth Greenfield (NZL)

== Goalscorers ==
There have been 106 goals scored in 14 matches, for an average of 7.57 goals per match (as of 1 December 2024).

15 goals

- Sam Lane (SA)

12 goals

- Dylan Thomas (CF)

7 goals

- George Baker (SA)

6 goals

- Sam Hiha (CF)
- Charl Ulrich (NT)

5 goals

- Luke Aldred (HM)
- James Nicolson (SA)

4 goals

- Jonty Elmes (CF)
- Oscar Nation (CF)
- James Hickson (NT)

3 goals

- Nic Woods (HM)
- Robbie Capizzi (NT)
- Liam Mortimer (NT)
- Maks Wyndham-Smith (NT)
- Nicholas Findlay (SA)
- Sam Lints (SA)

2 goals

- Owen Brown (HM)
- Paul Dösch (HM)
- Dylan Muggleston (HM)
- Blair Tarrant (SA)

1 goal

- Harrison Lawson (CF)
- Patrick Madder (CF)
- Bradley Coxon (HM)
- Vance Harvey (HM)
- Samuel Lowndes (HM)
- Tim Neild (HM)
- Scott Cosslett (NT)
- Luke Holmes (NT)
- Isaac Houlbrooke (NT)
- Rocco Ludolph (NT)
- Jayshaan Randhawa (NT)
- Finn Ward (SA)

Source: Hockey New Zealand
