= 2020 Men's Premier Hockey League =

Hockey New Zealand's national league, inaugural season

Tournament details
- Host country: New Zealand
- City: Hamilton
- Dates: 19 November – 6 December
- Teams: 4
- Venue: Gallagher Hockey Centre

Final positions
- Champions: –– Central Falcons (1st title)
- Runner-up: –– Southern Alpiners
- Third place: –– Hauraki Mavericks

Tournament statistics
- Matches played: 14
- Goals scored: 61 (4.36 per match)
- Top scorer: –– Nic Woods (9 goals)
- Best player: –– Jacob Smith

The 2020 Men's Sentinel Homes Premier Hockey League was the inaugural men's edition of Hockey New Zealand's national league. The tournament was held in Hamilton at the Gallagher Hockey Centre. Competition commenced on 19 November, culminating with finals matches on 6 December.

The Central Falcons won the tournament after defeating the Southern Alpiners 1–0 on penalties after the final finished as a 1–1 draw. The Hauraki Mavericks finished in bronze position, defeating the Northern Tridents 4–1.

== Competition format ==
=== Format ===
The 2020 Premier Hockey League saw a new format than that of the former, National Hockey League. Teams played in a double round-robin format during the Pool Stage, which was followed by two Classification Matches.

Following the results of the Pool Stage, the top two ranked teams contested the final, with the bottom two ranked teams playing off for third place.

=== Point allocation ===
Match points will be distributed as follows:

- 4 points: win
- 2 points: shoot-out win
- 1 points: shoot-out loss
- 0 points: loss

== Participating teams ==
The four teams competing in the league come from the various regions of New Zealand.

–– Central Falcons

Head Coach: Michael Delaney

1. Dom Dixon (GK)
2. Matthew Van Aardt (GK)
3. Mackenzie Wilcox
4. Benedict van Woerkom
5. Jordan Cohen
6. Sean Findlay
7. Shea McAleese
8. Stephen Jenness
9. Joe Hanks
10. Nick Wilson
11. Sam Hiha
12. Patrick Madder
13. Dane Lett
14. Brad Read
15. Jacob Smith
16. Harry Miskimmin
17. Dylan Thomas
18. Callum Olsen
19. Trent Lett
–– Hauraki Mavericks

Head Coach: Dean Couzins

1. Leon Hayward (GK)
2. Taylor Craigie (GK)
3. Jared Panchia
4. Aidan Sarikaya
5. Jacob Soo Choon
6. Maks Wyndham-Smith
7. Matt Rees-Gibbs
8. Tim Neild
9. Malcolm Curley
10. Marcus Child
11. Arun Panchia
12. Cam Hayde
13. Garrick Du Toit
14. Jonty Keaney
15. Nic Woods
16. Zander Fraser
17. Simon Child
18. Shae Iswar
19. Campbell Maclean
20. Daniel Panchia
21. Oliver Macintyre
22. Dwayne Rowsell
–– Northern Tridents

Head Coach: Bryce Collins

1. Richard Joyce (GK)
2. Angus Griffin (GK)
3. Ruan Bezuidenhout (C)
4. Richmond Lum
5. Charl Ulrich
6. Netesh Sukha
7. Robbie Capizzi
8. Xavier Guy
9. Sam Houston
10. Mitch Hayde
11. George Muir (C)
12. Isaac Houlbrooke
13. Maxwell Rasmussen
14. Liam Mortimer
15. Sanjay Lala
16. Cory Bennett
17. Benji Edwards
18. Steven Edwards
19. Connor Greentree
20. Kim Kingstone
21. Kieren O'Connor
22. Matt Symonds
–– Southern Alpiners

Head Coach: Grant Edwards

1. Louis Beckert (GK)
2. George Enersen (GK)
3. Joseph Morrison
4. George Connell
5. Hugo Inglis
6. Nick Elder
7. Kane Russell
8. Nicholas Lidstone
9. Nick Ross
10. Maxwell Rasmussen
11. Dominic Newman
12. Gus Wakeling
13. Finn Ward
14. Dylan Thomas
15. Jordan Ward
16. Malachi Buschl
17. Sam Lane
18. David Brydon
19. Blair Tarrant
20. Simon Yorston
21. Moss Jackson

== Results ==
All times are local (New Zealand Daylight Time).

=== Preliminary round ===
Pos	Team	Pld	W	WD	LD	L	GF	GA	GD	Pts	Qualification
1	–– Central Falcons	6	4	0	0	2	18	11	+7	16	Advanced to Final
2	–– Southern Alpiners	6	3	0	2	1	16	10	+6	14	Advanced to Final
3	–– Hauraki Mavericks	6	3	1	0	2	13	15	−2	14	
4	–– Northern Tridents	6	0	1	0	5	7	18	−11	2	

Source: Hockey New Zealand
Rules for classification: 1) points; 2) matches won; 3) goal difference; 4) goals for; 5) head-to-head result; 6) field goals scored.

==== Fixtures ====
19 November 2020
17:00

Northern Tridents ––	0–2	–– Hauraki Mavericks
	Report	Soo-Choon 1'; S. Child 12'

Umpires:
Lee Erskine (NZL)
Bevan Nichol (NZL)

19 November 2020
19:00

Central Falcons ––	2–1	–– Southern Alpiners
Wilson 21'; Hanks 60'	Report	Newman 50'

Umpires:
Bruce Brownsey (NZL)
Bren Duckworth (NZL)

21 November 2020
12:00

Northern Tridents ––	1–3	–– Central Falcons
Capizzi 54'	Report	Smith 8', 39'; Hiha 59'

Umpires:
Benjamin Grant (NZL)
Bevan Nichol (NZL)

21 November 2020
14:00

Southern Alpiners ––	2–2	–– Hauraki Mavericks
F. Ward 9'; Inglis 29'	Report	Woods 6', 60'
Penalties
Inglis (penalty shoot-out scored); Ross (penalty shoot-out missed); Tarrant (penalty shoot-out missed)	1–2	(penalty shoot-out scored) Woods; (penalty shoot-out scored) S. Child; (penalty shoot-out missed) Sarikaya

Umpires:
Bren Duckworth (NZL)
Lee Erskine (NZL)

22 November 2020
12:00

Southern Alpiners ––	2–2	–– Northern Tridents
Lane 5', 17'	Report	Houston 23', 55'
Penalties
Inglis (penalty shoot-out scored); Connell (penalty shoot-out missed); Lane (penalty shoot-out scored) —— Inglis (penalty shoot-out scored); Lane (penalty shoot-out missed); Connell (penalty shoot-out missed)	3–4	(penalty shoot-out scored) Edwards; (penalty shoot-out missed) O'Connor; (penalty shoot-out scored) Capizzi —— (penalty shoot-out scored) Edwards; (penalty shoot-out missed) Capizzi; (penalty shoot-out scored) O'Connor

Umpires:
Bevan Nichol (NZL)
Lee Erskine (NZL)

22 November 2020
14:00

Hauraki Mavericks ––	2–6	–– Central Falcons
Woods 48'; Rees-Gibbs 49'	Report	Hiha 12'; Wilcox 28'; Wilson 45', 51'; Olsen 50'; Lett 54'

Umpires:
Benjamin Grant (NZL)
Bren Duckworth (NZL)

2 December 2020
17:00

Central Falcons ––	3–1	–– Northern Tridents
Smith 11', 41'; Wilson 23'	Report	O'Connor 21'

Umpires:
Timothy Bond (NZL)
Nicholas Saunders (NZL)

2 December 2020
19:00

Hauraki Mavericks ––	1–3	–– Southern Alpiners
Woods 14'	Report	Newman 5'; Inglis 35'; Lane 56'

Umpires:
David Tomlinson (NZL)
Simon Taylor (NZL)

3 December 2020
17:00

Northern Tridents ––	1–5	–– Southern Alpiners
Greentree 14'	Report	F. Ward 5'; Jackson 25'; Russell 30'; Lane 44'; Morrison 45'

Umpires:
Nicholas Saunders (NZL)
David Tomlinson (NZL)

3 December 2020
19:00

Central Falcons ––	2–3	–– Hauraki Mavericks
Smith 36'; Hiha 36'	Report	Woods 12', 38'; S. Child 17'

Umpires:
Gareth Greenfield (NZL)
Timothy Bond (NZL)

5 December 2020
12:00

Southern Alpiners ––	3–2	–– Central Falcons
Inglis 8'; Lane 25'; F. Ward 28'	Report	Jenness 6'; Lett 33'

Umpires:
David Tomlinson (NZL)
Gareth Greenfield (NZL)

5 December 2020
14:00

Hauraki Mavericks ––	3–2	–– Northern Tridents
Keaney 39'; Woods 52'; Sarikaya 58'	Report	Bennett 8', 29'

Umpires:
Simon Taylor (NZL)
Timothy Bond (NZL)

=== Classification round ===
==== Third and fourth place ====
6 December 2020
12:00

Hauraki Mavericks ––	4–1	–– Northern Tridents
Rees-Gibbs 30'; Woods 33', 60+'; Hayde 55'	Report	Edwards 38'

Umpires:
Simon Taylor (NZL)
Nicholas Saunders (NZL)

==== Final ====
6 December 2020
14:00

Central Falcons ––	1–1	–– Southern Alpiners
Hiha 58'	Report	Lane 60'
Penalties
Jenness (penalty shoot-out scored); Smith (penalty shoot-out missed)	1–0	(penalty shoot-out missed) Ross; (penalty shoot-out missed) F. Ward; (penalty shoot-out missed) Lane

Umpires:
Gareth Greenfield (NZL)
David Tomlinson (NZL)

== Awards ==
Player of the Tournament	Top Goalscorer
–– Jacob Smith	–– Nic Woods

== Statistics ==
=== Final standings ===
Pos	Team	Pld	W	WD	LD	L	GF	GA	GD	Pts	Final standing
1st place, gold medalist(s)	–– Central Falcons	7	4	1	0	2	19	12	+7	18	Gold Medal
2nd place, silver medalist(s)	–– Southern Alpiners	7	3	0	3	1	17	11	+6	15	Silver Medal
3rd place, bronze medalist(s)	–– Hauraki Mavericks	7	4	1	0	2	17	16	+1	18	Bronze Medal
4	–– Northern Tridents	7	0	1	0	6	8	22	−14	2	Fourth Place

Source: Hockey New Zealand

==== Goalscorers ====
There were 61 goals scored in 14 matches, for an average of 4.36 goals per match.

9 goals

- –– Nic Woods

6 goals

- –– Samuel Lane

5 goals

- –– Jacob Smith

4 goals

- –– Samuel Hiha
- –– Nick Wilson

3 goals

- –– Hugo Inglis
- –– Finn Ward

2 goals

- –– Dane Lett
- –– Simon Child
- –– Matthew Rees-Gibbs
- –– Cory Bennett
- –– Samuel Houston
- –– Dominic Newman

1 goal

- –– Joseph Hanks
- –– Stephen Jenness
- –– Callum Olsen
- –– Mackenzie Wilcox
- –– Cameron Hayde
- –– Jonathan Keaney
- –– Aidan Sarikaya
- –– Jacob Soo-Choon
- –– Robert Capizzi
- –– Steven Edwards
- –– Connor Greentree
- –– Kieran O'Connor
- –– Joseph Morrison
- –– Moss Jackson
- –– Kane Russell

Source: Hockey New Zealand
