= Ella Hyatt Brown =

New Zealand field hockey player (born 1997)

Personal information
- Born: 4 November 1997 (age 28) Takapuna, New Zealand

Sport
- Sport: Field hockey
- Position: Defence
Senior career
Years	Team	Caps	Goals
2020–	Northern Tridents	-	-
National team
Years	Team	Caps	Goals
2014–2014	New Zealand U–18	12	(11)
2017–2018	New Zealand U–21	3	(0)
2022–	New Zealand	5	(0)
Medal record
Women's field hockey
Representing New Zealand

Ella Hyatt Brown (born 4 November 1997) is an international field hockey player from New Zealand.

== Personal life ==
Ella Hyatt Brown was born and raised in Takapuna, a northern suburb of Auckland, New Zealand.

== Career ==
=== Domestic league ===
Hyatt Brown currently competes in the Premier Hockey League. She has been a member of the Northern Tridents squad since 2020, and captained the team during the 2024 season. She has also previously represented her home association, North Harbour, in the Ford National Hockey League.

=== Under–18 ===
Throughout 2014, Hyatt Brown represented the New Zealand U–18 team. She was a member of the squad at the Oceania Qualifiers for the Youth Olympic Games held in Port Vila. She then went on to represent the team again at the Youth Olympics in Nanjing in the Hockey5s tournament.

=== Under–21 ===
Hyatt Brown made her first appearances for the Junior Black Sticks in 2018. She captained the side in a three match Trans–Tasman Series against Australia in Hastings.

=== Black Sticks ===
After years in the national development squad, Hyatt Brown finally received a call-up to the Black Sticks squad in 2022. She made her senior international debut that year, earning her first international cap during a match against Australia in the Trans–Tasman Series in Auckland. She was also named as a reserve player for the FIH World Cup in Terrassa and Amsterdam, as well as the XXII Commonwealth Games in Birmingham.

Following the 2022 season, Hyatt Brown did not represent the national team again until 2025. She returned to the national squad for a test-series against the United States in Charlotte. She has most recently been named in the squad for the 2025 Oceania Cup in Darwin.
