= Hauraki Mavericks =

New Zealand field hockey club

- Full name: Hauraki Mavericks
- League: Premier Hockey League
- Founded: 2020; 6 years ago
- Home ground: National Hockey Centre, Auckland, New Zealand (Capacity 500)

Personnel
- Coach: Dean Couzins (M); Mark Borgers (W)
- Website: blacksticksnz.co.nz

The Hauraki Mavericks are a New Zealand based field hockey club, originating in the nation's central region. The club was established in 2020, and is one of four established to compete in Hockey New Zealand's new premier domestic competition, the Premier Hockey League.

The club unifies both men and women under one name.

The Hauraki Mavericks competed for the first time in the inaugural season of Premier Hockey League, where both the men's and women's teams finished in third place in their respective tournaments.

== History ==
Along with three other teams, the Hauraki Mavericks were founded in 2020 as part of Hockey New Zealand's development of hockey.

The team unifies the region from Auckland to Taupō. The team garner their name from a maverick; a person who thinks independently, and "never, ever gives up."

== Teams ==
=== Men ===
The following players represented the men's team during the 2020 edition of the Sentinel Homes Premier Hockey League.

1. Leon Hayward (GK)
2. Taylor Craigie (GK)
3. Jared Panchia
4. Aidan Sarikaya
5. Jacob Soo-Choon
6. Maks Wyndham-Smith
7. Matthew Rees-Gibbs
8. Timothy Neild
9. Malcolm Curley
10. Marcus Child
11. Arun Panchia
12. Cameron Hayde
13. Garrick du Toit
14. Jonathan Keaney
15. Nic Woods
16. Zander Fraser
17. Simon Child
18. Shae Iswar
19. Campbell MacLean
20. Daniel Panchia
21. Oliver MacIntyre
22. Dwayne Rowsell

=== Women ===
The following players represented the women's team during the 2020 edition of the Sentinel Homes Premier Hockey League.

1. Alice McIlroy-Foster (GK)
2. Grace O'Hanlon (GK)
3. Louisa Tuilotolava
4. Elizabeth Thompson
5. Alison Hunt
6. Julia King
7. Maddison Dowe
8. Tayla White
9. Alia Jaques
10. Eva Zylstra
11. Kendra Peart-Anderson
12. Kimberley Tanner
13. Sophie Morrison
14. Lydia Woods
15. Amelia Marlow
16. Tarryn Davey
17. Rose Keddell
18. Alex Lukin
19. Amy Robinson
20. Tori Robinson
21. Breana Catley
