= Rebecca Baker =

New Zealand field hockey player (born 2001)

Personal information
- Born: 8 March 2002 (age 24) Gisborne, New Zealand

Sport
- Sport: Field hockey
- Position: Forward
Senior career
Years	Team	Caps	Goals
2020–	Central Falcons	-	-
National team
Years	Team	Caps	Goals
2022–2023	New Zealand U–21	6	(0)
2024–	New Zealand	8	(0)
Medal record
Women's field hockey
Representing New Zealand
FIH Nations Cup
Gold medal – first place	2024–25 Santiago

Rebecca Baker (born 8 March 2002) is a field hockey player from New Zealand.

== Early life ==
Rebecca Baker was born in Gisborne, and grew up in Whanganui.

== Career ==
=== National league ===
In the Premier Hockey League, Baker plays for the Central Falcons, with whom she won a gold medals in 2020 and 2024. She has also previously represented Auckland in the Ford National Hockey Championship, including a gold medal performance in 2023.

=== Under–21 ===
She was member of the Junior Black Sticks squad at the FIH Junior World Cup in Santiago.

=== Black Sticks ===
Following her junior debut in 2022, Baker was named in the Black Sticks squad for a test series against Japan in Auckland. She made her debut during the series, marking her first international cap.

She has been named in an extended national squad for 2025.
