= Paige Blake =

New Zealand field hockey player (born 2003)

Personal information
- Born: 17 July 2003 (age 23) Auckland, New Zealand

Sport
- Sport: Field hockey
- Position: Midfield
Senior career
Years	Team	Caps	Goals
2024–	Northern Tridents	-	-
National team
Years	Team	Caps	Goals
2022–2023	New Zealand U–21	9	(0)
2023–	New Zealand	7	(2)
Medal record
Women's field hockey
Representing New Zealand
FIH Nations Cup
Gold medal – first place	2024–25 Santiago
Junior Oceania Cup
Silver medal – second place	2022 Canberra

Paige Blake (born 17 July 2003) is a field hockey player from New Zealand.

== Early life ==
Paige Blake grew up in Auckland.

== Career ==
=== National league ===
In the Premier Hockey League, Blake plays for the Northern Tridents.

=== Under–21 ===
Blake made her international debut at under–21 level. She was a member of the silver medal-winning Junior Black Sticks squad at the 2022 Junior Oceania Cup in Canberra. This tournament acted as the Oceania qualifier for the FIH Junior World Cup, with the silver medal securing a qualification quota for New Zealand.

She then went on to represent the junior squad at the 2023 FIH Junior World Cup in Santiago.

=== Black Sticks ===
Following her successful junior debut, Blake made her senior international debut for the Black Sticks in 2023. She made her first appearances during the Christchurch Leg of the fourth season of the FIH Pro League.

She has been named in an extended national squad for 2025.

==== International goals ====
Goal	Date	Location	Opponent	Score	Result	Competition	Ref.
1	20 January 2025	Lloyd Elsmore Park, Auckland, New Zealand	United States	1–0	3–2	Test Match	
2	20 January 2025	Lloyd Elsmore Park, Auckland, New Zealand	United States	2–2	3–2	Test Match	
