= Isabella Gill =

New Zealand field hockey player (born 2001)

Personal information
- Born: 18 May 2001 (age 25) Auckland, New Zealand

Sport
- Sport: Field hockey
- Position: Defence
Senior career
| Years | Team | Caps | Goals |
| 2019–2023 | Auckland | - | - |
| 2022–2022 | Adelaide Fire | - | - |
| 2024– | Hauraki Mavericks | - | - |
National team
| Years | Team | Caps | Goals |
| 2022 | New Zealand U–21 | 3 | (0) |
| 2024– | New Zealand | 1 | (0) |
Medal record
Women's field hockey
Representing New Zealand
Junior Oceania Cup
| Silver medal – second place | 2022 Canberra |

Isabella "Izzy" Gill (born 18 May 2001) is a field hockey player from New Zealand.

== Early life ==
Isabella Gill was born on 18 May 2001, in Auckland, New Zealand.

== Career ==
=== National league ===
In the Premier Hockey League, Gill plays for the Hauraki Mavericks. She has also previously represented Auckland in the Ford National Hockey Championship, including a gold medal performance in 2023.

Gill has also previously represented Australian based teams. In 2022, she moved to Australia for the second season of the Hockey One League where she represented the Adelaide Fire. She represented another Australian based team in 2024, taking the field for the Territory Stingers for the NT Festival of Hockey.

=== Under–21 ===
Gill made her international debut in 2022 at under–21 level. She was a co–captain of the silver medal-winning Junior Black Sticks squad at the 2022 Junior Oceania Cup in Canberra, the Oceania qualifier for the FIH Junior World Cup.

=== Black Sticks ===
Following her junior debut in 2022, Gill was eventually moved into the Black Sticks squad on an event contract.

She made her senior international debut in 2024, making her first appearance during a test series against Japan in Auckland.
