= Katie Doar =

New Zealand field hockey player (born 2001)

Personal information
- Born: 11 September 2001 (age 24) Whangārei, New Zealand
- Height: 169 cm (5 ft 7 in)

Sport
- Sport: Field hockey
- Position: Midfield
Senior career
Years	Team	Caps	Goals
2017–2019	Auckland	21	2
2020–	Northern Tridents	7	0
National team
Years	Team	Caps	Goals
2018–	New Zealand U–21	7	(0)
2019–	New Zealand	73	(5)
Medal record
Oceania Cup
Silver medal – second place	2023 Whangārei

Katie Doar (born 11 September 2001) is a New Zealand field hockey player, who plays as a midfielder.

== Personal life ==
Katie Doar was born and raised in Whangārei. She has an elder sister, Madison, who has also represented New Zealand in field hockey. Doar attended Kamo Intermediate School and Whangarei Girls' High School before boarding at St Cuthbert's College in Auckland.

== Career ==
=== Domestic leagues ===
==== Ford National Hockey League ====
In 2019, Hockey New Zealand overhauled the National Hockey League. Until the conclusion of the league, Doar was a member of the Auckland team.

==== Premier Hockey League ====
Following the overhaul of the NHL, Doar was named in the Northern Tridents squad for New Zealand's new premier domestic competition, the Premier Hockey League. In the inaugural season of the league, Doar played in each game, helping the team to a silver medal.

=== National teams ===
==== Under-21 ====
Katie Doar made her debut for the New Zealand U-21 team in 2018 during a Trans–Tasman test series against Australia in Hastings.

She followed this up with an appearance at a Tri–Nations tournament in Canberra.

==== Black Sticks ====
Doar made her senior debut for the Black Sticks in 2019, during season one of the FIH Pro League.
