= Central Falcons (field hockey team) =

New Zealand field hockey club

- Full name: Central Falcons
- League: Premier Hockey League
- Founded: 2020; 6 years ago
- Home ground: National Hockey Stadium, Wellington, New Zealand

Personnel
- Coach: Michael Delaney (M); Darren Smith (M)
- Website: blacksticksnz.co.nz

The Central Falcons are a New Zealand based professional field hockey club, originating in the nation's central region. The club was established in 2020, and is one of four established to compete in Hockey New Zealand's new premier domestic competition, the Premier Hockey League.

The club unifies both men and women under one name.

The Central Falcons competed for the first time in the inaugural season of Premier Hockey League, where both the men's and women's teams won their respective tournaments.

== History ==
Along with three other teams, the Central Falcons were founded in 2020 as part of Hockey New Zealand's development of hockey.

The team unifies the region from Taupō to Wellington; this is also where the team gets its name. The team was named after the New Zealand falcon, which is native to the central region of New Zealand's North Island.

== Teams ==
=== Men ===
The following players represented the men's team during the 2020 edition of the Sentinel Homes Premier Hockey League.

1. Dominic Dixon (GK)
2. Matthew van Aardt (GK)
3. Mackenzie Wilcox
4. Benedict van Woerkom
5. Jordan Cohen
6. Sean Findlay
7. Shea McAleese
8. Stephen Jenness
9. Joseph Hanks
12. Nicholas Wilson
13. Samuel Hiha
14. Patrick Madder
15. Dane Lett
16. Bradley Read
17. Jacob Smith
18. Harrison Miskimmin
19. Dylan Thomas
20. Callum Olsen
21. Trent Lett

=== Women ===
The following players represented the women's team during the 2020 edition of the Sentinel Homes Premier Hockey League.

1. Georgia Barnett (GK)
2. Kelly Carline (GK)
3. Estelle MacAdre
4. Kayla Whitelock
5. Casey Crowley
6. Kaitlin Cotter
7. Megan Hull
8. Jessica Kelly
9. Kiri Wairau-Hunter
10. Holly Pearson
11. Hope Ralph
12. Olivia Shannon
13. Michaela Curtis
14. Ruby Logan
15. Felicity Reidy
16. Aniwaka Roberts
17. Rileigh Knapp
18. Jenna-Rae McIntyre
19. Emma Rainey
20. Rebecca Baker
21. Kelsey Smith
