= 2023 Women's Oceania Cup =

Field hockey tournament

Tournament details
- Host country: New Zealand
- City: Whangārei
- Dates: 10–13 August
- Teams: 2 (from 1 confederation)
- Venue: ITM Hockey Centre

Final positions
- Champions: Australia (8th title)
- Runner-up: New Zealand

Tournament statistics
- Matches played: 3
- Goals scored: 10 (3.33 per match)
- Top scorer(s): (Australia) Ambrosia Malone (Australia) Brooke Peris (2 goals)

The 2023 Women's Oceania Cup was the twelfth edition of the Women's Oceania Cup after the cancellation of the 2022 edition due to the COVID-19 pandemic, the biennial international women's field hockey championship of Oceania organised by the Oceania Hockey Federation. It was held from 10 to 13 August 2023.

New Zealand were the defending champions, having won the 2019 edition. The event consisted of a three match series between defending champions and series hosts, New Zealand, and Australia. Australia, as the winner, qualified for the 2024 Summer Olympics.

== Squads ==
Australia

Head coach: Katrina Powell

1. Claire Colwill
2. Ambrosia Malone
3. Brooke Peris (C)
4. Amy Lawton
6. Penny Squibb
13. Harriet Shand
14. Stephanie Kershaw
15. Kaitlin Nobbs (C)
16. Courtney Schonell
18. Jane Claxton (C)
19. Jocelyn Bartram (GK)
20. Karri Somerville
21. Renee Taylor
22. Tatum Stewart
24. Mariah Williams
29. Rebecca Greiner
30. Grace Stewart (C)
41. Zoe Newman (GK)
New Zealand

Head coach: Phillip Burrows

1. Tarryn Davey
2. Olivia Shannon
4. Olivia Merry (C)
5. Frances Davies
6. Hope Ralph
8. Hannah Cotter
10. Brooke Roberts (GK)
11. Casey Crowley
13. Samantha Child
15. Grace O'Hanlon (GK)
16. Elizabeth Thompson
17. Stephanie Dickins
20. Megan Hull
21. Alia Jaques
22. Katie Doar
25. Kelsey Smith
32. Rose Tynan
33. Julia King

== Officials ==
The following umpires were appointed by the FIH to officiate the tournament:

- Amber Church (NZL)
- Gareth Greenfield (NZL)
- Aleisha Neumann (AUS)
- Steve Rogers (AUS)
- David Tomlinson (NZL)

== Results ==
=== Standings ===
Pos	Team	Pld	W	D	L	GF	GA	GD	Pts	Qualification
1	Australia	3	2	1	0	7	3	+4	7	2024 Summer Olympics
2	New Zealand (H)	3	0	1	2	3	7	−4	1	2024 FIH Hockey Olympic Qualifiers

Source: FIH
Rules for classification: 1) points; 2) matches won; 3) goal difference; 4) goals for; 5) head-to-head result; 6) field goals for.
(H) Hosts

All times are local (UTC+12).

=== Fixtures ===
10 August 2023
17:05

New Zealand	0–3	Australia
	Report	Colwill 30'; Malone 34'; Peris 34'

Umpires:
Amber Church (NZL)
Aleisha Neumann (AUS)

12 August 2023
16:05

New Zealand	1–1	Australia
Cotter 37'	Report	Malone 51'

Umpires:
Aleisha Neumann (AUS)
Amber Church (NZL)

13 August 2023
16:05

New Zealand	2–3	Australia
Davey 4'; Ralph 37'	Report	Peris 21'; G. Stewart 23'; Schonell 32'

Umpires:
Amber Church (NZL)
Aleisha Neumann (AUS)

== Goalscorers ==
There were 10 goals scored in 3 matches, for an average of 3.33 goals per match.

2 goals

- (Australia) Ambrosia Malone
- (Australia) Brooke Peris

1 goal

- (Australia) Claire Colwill
- (Australia) Courtney Schonell
- (Australia) Grace Stewart
- (New Zealand) Hannah Cotter
- (New Zealand) Tarryn Davey
- (New Zealand) Hope Ralph

Source: FIH

== See also ==
- 2023 Men's Oceania Cup
