= Sam Hiha =

New Zealand field hockey player

Personal information
- Full name: Samuel Ruruarau Hiha
- Born: 26 August 1997 (age 28) Napier, New Zealand

Sport
- Sport: Field hockey
- Position: Forward
Senior career
Years	Team	Caps	Goals
2016–2019	Central	21	4
2020–	Central Falcons	7	4
National team
Years	Team	Caps	Goals
2016–2018	New Zealand U–21	16	(4)
2021–	New Zealand	18	(2)
Medal record
Men's field hockey
Representing New Zealand
Oceania Cup
Silver medal – second place	2023 Whangārei
Silver medal – second place	2025 Darwin

Samuel Ruruarau Hiha (born 26 August 1997) is a New Zealand field hockey player, who plays as a forward.

== Personal life ==
Sam Hiha was born and raised in Napier, New Zealand.

Hiha is a graduate of Napier Boys' High School.

His grandmother Margaret Hiha, coach in 1983 Women's Hockey World Cup.

== Career ==
=== Domestic competitions ===
==== Ford NHL ====
Sam Hiha was a member of the Central Mavericks in the Ford National Hockey League (NHL), representing the team from 2016 to 2019. During his time with the team, Hiha won bronze medal in the 2016 edition of the tournament.

==== Premier Hockey League ====
Following the overhaul of the NHL and subsequent introduction of the Premier Hockey League, Hiha was named in the Central Falcons. The league's inaugural edition was held in 2020, with the team taking home a gold medal.

=== National teams ===
==== Under-21 ====
In 2016, Hiha made two appearances for the New Zealand U-21 team. His first was at the Sultan of Johor Cup in Johor Bahru, followed by the FIH Junior World Cup in Lucknow.

Two years later, in 2018, Hiha again represented the Under-21 team at the Sultan of Johor Cup.

==== Black Sticks ====
In 2020, Hiha was named in the Black Sticks squad for the first time, however due to the impact of the COVID-19 pandemic he made no international appearances.

Hiha was again named in the national squad in December 2020, for the 2021 Olympic year.
