= Emma Rainey =

New Zealand field hockey player (born 1999)

Personal information
- Born: 1 October 1999 (age 27) Whanganui, New Zealand

Sport
- Sport: Field hockey
- Position: Midfield
Senior career
Years	Team	Caps	Goals
2020–	Central Falcons	-	-
National team
Years	Team	Caps	Goals
2018	New Zealand U–21	3	(0)
2024–	New Zealand	14	(1)
Medal record
Women's field hockey
Representing New Zealand
FIH Nations Cup
Gold medal – first place	2024–25 Santiago

Emma Rainey (born 1 October 1999) is a New Zealand field hockey player.

== Early life ==
Rainey was born and raised in Whanganui, a town on New Zealand's North Island.

== Career ==
=== National league ===
In the Premier Hockey League, Rainey plays for the Central Falcons. She has also previously represented Auckland and Canterbury in the Ford National Hockey Championship.

=== Black Sticks ===
Rainey made her senior international debut for the Black Sticks in 2024. She made her first appearances during a test series against Japan in Auckland. Later in the year she made her first appearance at a major tournament, competing with the squad at the 2023–24 FIH Nations Cup in Terrassa.

She has been named in an extended 2025 national squad.
