= Brittany Wang =

New Zealand field hockey player (born 2001)

Personal information
- Born: 20 August 2001 (age 25) Christchurch, New Zealand

Sport
- Sport: Field hockey
- Position: Forward
Senior career
Years	Team	Caps	Goals
2019–2024	Canterbury	-	-
2020–	Southern Alpiners	-	-
2022–2022	Adelaide Fire	-	-
National team
Years	Team	Caps	Goals
2023–2023	New Zealand U–21	3	(0)
2025–	New Zealand	7	(0)
Medal record
Women's field hockey
Representing New Zealand
FIH Nations Cup
Gold medal – first place	2024–25 Santiago
Junior Oceania Cup
Silver medal – second place	2022 Canberra

Brittany Wang (born 20 August 2001) is a field hockey player from New Zealand.

== Career ==
=== National league ===
In the Premier Hockey League, Wang plays for the Southern Alpiners.

She has also previously represented Canterbury in the Ford National Hockey Championship, and the Adelaide Fire in Hockey Australia's domestic competition, the Hockey One League.

=== Under–21 ===
She was member of the Junior Black Sticks squad that won silver at the 2022 Junior Oceania Cup in Canberra.

=== Black Sticks ===
Wang receiver her first call-up into the Black Sticks squad in 2024. She made her senior international debut in 2025, during a test series against the United States in Auckland.
