= Tarryn Davey =

New Zealand field hockey player

Personal information
- Born: 29 February 1996 (age 30) Morrinsville, New Zealand
- Height: 1.69 m (5 ft 7 in)
- Weight: 62 kg (137 lb)

Sport
- Sport: Field hockey
- Position: Defender
- Club: Midlands
National team
Years	Team	Caps	Goals
–	New Zealand	31	-
Medal record
Oceania Cup
Gold medal – first place	2019 Rockhampton
Silver medal – second place	2023 Whangārei

Tarryn Davey (born 29 February 1996) is a New Zealand field hockey player for the New Zealand national team.

She participated at the 2018 Women's Hockey World Cup.
