= Rachel Williams (hockey umpire) =

International field hockey umpire

- Born: 1 November
- Known for: Field Hockey Umpire
- Awards: England Hockey Official of the Year 2023 Tauranga Hockey Official of the Year 2023
- Field Hockey Career

Rachel Louise Williams is an international field hockey umpire for the International Hockey Federation (Fédération Internationale de Hockey, FIH) and the European Hockey Federation. Williams represents Great Britain and England Hockey on the FIH Pro League panel.

== Refereeing and umpiring ==
Williams started umpiring hockey in 2006 following an anterior cruciate ligament reconstruction and three further knee surgeries. She began volunteering for England Hockey on their Youth Panel in 2006, was runner up for World Youth Promoter of the Year in 2010 and continues to volunteer as the Secretary of the National Programme Umpiring Association in England.

Williams has umpired various forms of hockey, including the 11-a-side game, indoor hockey, and Hockey5s. Most of her domestic growth in recent years has been in the Women's England Hockey League.

In 2014, before Williams officially qualified as a level 3 indoor umpire, she umpired the National Indoor Final with Frances Block – the first of many national finals and the start of a long career.

First appointed internationally as a judge at the Outdoor Women's Nations Championship III in Greece, Williams made her move to international umpiring in 2014 when she was appointed to the Indoor Women's EuroHockey Indoor Club Cup in Šiauliai, Lithuania. Her first international outdoor appointment was to the FIH Women's Four Nations Invitational Tournament in Berlin, Germany. After this, she continued to have consistent international appointments.

A busy set of years for Williams included umpiring at the Commonwealth Games in 2022 where she refereed the first game of the event and rounded up with the bronze medal match between India and New Zealand. Additionally, she officiated the inaugural FIH World Hockey 5s event, marking the first time a female had umpired a match between the rival men's teams of India and Pakistan. Continuing this trajectory, Williams served as an umpire for men's 11-a-side hockey for the first time at Euro Hockey League in 2022 and went on, a month later, to umpire matches between some of the top men's teams in the world (Argentina, Belgium, and Germany) at the Pro League in Mendoza, Argentina. At the start of 2023, following on from umpiring the EuroHockey Indoor Championships final between indoor giants (Germany and the Netherlands), Williams was appointed to her second Indoor World Cup in South Africa, where she became the first female to umpire at a men's Hockey World Cup and went on to umpire a women's semi-final and umpire the men's World Cup Final.

Later in 2023, Williams went to the Outdoor EuroHockey Championship (Hockey Olympic Qualifiers) where she was the first umpire to be appointed to both a men's and women's medal match at the same event. She became the first umpire to wear shorts at such an event, in a move towards a more inclusive clothing policy for the sport. She was selected to officiate field hockey at the Paris 2024 Olympic Games.

Williams was awarded England Hockey Official of the Year 2023 as well as Tauranga Hockey Official of the Year 2023.

=== Appointments ===
- 2014 Women's EuroHockey Indoor Club Cup: Šiauliai, Lithuania
- 2014 Women's Four Nations Cup, FIH invitational tournament: Berlin, Germany
- 2015 Outdoor Women's EuroHockey Cup Winners Challenge II: Mérignac, France
- 2015 Outdoor Women's EuroHockey Under 18 Championship: Santander, Spain
- 2016 Women's EuroHockey Indoor Championship II: Cambrai, France
- 2016 Women's EuroHockey Club Trophy: Dundee, Scotland
- 2016 Outdoor Women's EuroHockey Cup Winners Challenge I: Prague, Czechia
- 2016 Outdoor Women's EuroHockey5s Future Heroes Cup B: Wałcz, Poland
- 2017 Women's EuroHockey Indoor Club Trophy: Šiauliai, Lithuania
- 2017 Outdoor Women's EuroHockey Club Challenge II: Vienna, Austria
- 2017 Outdoor Women's EuroHockey5s Under 16 Championship: Wattignies, France
- 2017 Outdoor Women's EuroHockey Junior Championship II: Hradec Králové, Czechia
- 2017 Women's Indoor Pan American Cup: Georgetown, Guyana
- 2018 Women's EuroHockey Indoor Championship II: Brussels, Belgium
- 2018 Women's EuroHockey Indoor Club Cup: Dundee, Scotland
- 2018 Women's Indoor Hockey World Cup, FIH: Berlin, Germany
- 2018 Outdoor Women's EuroHockey Club Trophy: Dublin, Ireland
- Women's Series Finals: Banbridge, Northern Ireland
- 2019 Women's EuroHockey Indoor Club Cup: Hamburg, Germany
- 2019 Outdoor Women's EuroHockey Club Champions Cup: Amsterdam, Netherlands
- 2019 Outdoor Women's EuroHockey Championship II: Glasgow, Scotland
- 2020 Women's EuroHockey Indoor Championship: Minsk, Belarus
- 2020 Women's EuroHockey Indoor Club Challenge I: Porto, Portugal
- 2020 Outdoor Women's EuroHockey Club Challenge III: Sveti Ivan Zelina, Croatia (Cancelled due to the COVID-19 pandemic)
- 2021 Outdoor Women's EuroHockey5s Women's Tournament: Wałcz, Poland (Cancelled due to COVID-19)
- 2021 Outdoor Women's EuroHockey Club Challenge I: Prague, Czechia
- 2021 Women's EuroHockey Indoor Junior Championship: Olten, Switzerland (Cancelled due to COVID-19)
- 2022 Outdoor Women's EuroHockey5s Under 16: Basel, Switzerland
- 2022 Outdoor Women's EuroHockey Qualifier D: Dunkirk, France
- 2022 Outdoor Euro Hockey League KO16: Hamburg, Germany
- 2022 Women's EuroHockey Indoor Championship: Hamburg, Germany
- 2022 FIH Hero Hockey5s: Lausanne, Switzerland
- 2022 Commonwealth Games: Birmingham, England
- 2022 FIH Hockey Pro League: Mendoza, Argentina
- 2023 FIH Hockey Pro League: Wellington, New Zealand
- 2023 FIH Hockey Pro League: Hobart, Australia
- 2023 Outdoor Women's and Men's EuroHockey Championship: Mönchengladbach, Germany
- 2023 Women's FIH Indoor Hockey World Cup: Pretoria, South Africa
- 2024 Olympic Games: Paris, France
