= Dane Lett =

New Zealand field hockey player (born 1990)

Personal information
- Born: 29 August 1990 (age 36) Carterton, New Zealand
- Height: 181 cm (5 ft 11 in)
- Weight: 83 kg (183 lb)

Sport
- Sport: Field hockey
- Position: Defence
- Club: Central Falcons
Senior career
Years	Team	Caps	Goals
–2019	Capital	42	13
2020–	Central Falcons	7	2
National team
Years	Team	Caps	Goals
2011	New Zealand U–21	6	(0)
2014–	New Zealand	83	(2)
Medal record
Men's field hockey
Representing New Zealand
Commonwealth Games
Silver medal – second place	2018 Gold Coast	Team
Oceania Cup
Silver medal – second place	2019 Rockhampton
Silver medal – second place	2023 Whangārei
Silver medal – second place	2025 Darwin

Dane Lett (born 29 August 1990) is a New Zealand field hockey player, who plays as a defender.

== Personal life ==
Dane Lett was born and raised in Carterton, New Zealand.

== Career ==
=== National teams ===
==== Under-21 ====
Lett debuted for the New Zealand U-21 team in 2011 at the Sultan of Johor Cup in Johor Bahru.

==== Black Sticks ====
In 2014, Lett made his official debut for the Black Sticks during a test series against Japan in Wellington.

Following his debut, Lett was left out of national squads for a number of years, reappearing in 2017. Lett won his first medal at a major tournament in 2018, taking home silver at the Commonwealth Games on the Gold Coast.

In 2019, Lett won his second silver medal with the Black Sticks at the Oceania Cup in Rockhampton.

=== International goals ===
Goal	Date	Location	Opponent	Score	Result	Competition	Ref.
1	25 January 2018	Gallagher Hockey Centre, Hamilton, New Zealand	Japan	2–0	6–2	Test Match	
2	6 April 2018	Gold Coast Hockey Centre, Gold Coast, Australia	Canada	4–0	6–2	2018 Commonwealth Games	
