= Rose Tynan =

New Zealand field hockey player

Personal information
- Born: 20 March 1997 (age 29) Auckland, New Zealand
- Height: 167 cm (5 ft 6 in)

Sport
- Sport: Field hockey
- Position: Forward
- Club: Northern Tridents
National team
Years	Team	Caps	Goals
2020–	New Zealand	4	(2)
Medal record
Women's field hockey
Representing New Zealand
Oceania Cup
Silver medal – second place	2023 Whangārei

Rose Tynan (born 20 March 1997) is a New Zealand field hockey player.

== Personal life ==
Rose Tynan was born and raised in Auckland, New Zealand.

She is the granddaughter of Jack Tynan, who also played field hockey and captained the Black Sticks.

== Career ==
=== Black Sticks ===
Rose Tynan made her debut for the Black Sticks in 2022, during the Trans–Tasman series in Auckland. Following her debut, she was named in the squad for the FIH World Cup in Amsterdam and Terrassa, as well as the Commonwealth Games in Birmingham.

=== International goals ===
Goal	Date	Location	Opponent	Score	Result	Competition	Ref.
1	10 May 2022	National Hockey Centre, Auckland, New Zealand	Australia	1–1	2–2	2022 Trans–Tasman Series	
2	2 July 2022	Wagener Stadium, Amsterdam, Netherlands	China	1–0	2–2	2022 FIH World Cup	
3	29 July 2022	University of Birmingham Hockey Centre, Birmingham, England	Kenya	11–0	16–0	XXII Commonwealth Games	
4	30 July 2022	University of Birmingham Hockey Centre, Birmingham, England	Scotland	1–0	1–0	XXII Commonwealth Games	
5	19 January 2024	Jaipal Singh Stadium, Ranchi, India	Italy	1–0	3–1	2024 FIH Olympic Qualifiers	
6	14 April 2024	National Hockey Centre, Auckland, New Zealand	Japan	2–1	2–1	Test Match	
7	8 June 2024	Estadi Martí Colomer, Terrassa, Spain	Ireland	1–0	1–2	2023–24 FIH Nations Cup	
8	9 June 2024	Estadi Martí Colomer, Terrassa, Spain	Chile	1–2	1–2	2023–24 FIH Nations Cup	
