= Grace O'Hanlon =

New Zealand field hockey player

Personal information
- Born: 10 September 1992 (age 33) Maryborough, Australia
- Height: 1.79 m (5 ft 10 in)
- Weight: 74 kg (163 lb)

Sport
- Sport: Field hockey
- Position: Goalkeeper
- Club: Surbiton
National team
Years	Team	Caps	Goals
–	New Zealand	112	(0)
Medal record
Oceania Cup
Gold medal – first place	2019 Rockhampton
Silver medal – second place	2023 Whangārei
FIH Nations Cup
Gold medal – first place	2024–25 Santiago

Grace O'Hanlon (born 10 September 1992) is a New Zealand player for the New Zealand national team She plays as a goalkeeper.

She participated at the 2018 Women's Hockey World Cup, and 2020 Women's FIH Pro League.

In 2025 she was named the FIH Goal Keeper of the Year, the first time a New Zealand player won a senior FIH global award

O'Hanlon formerly played for Auckland in New Zealand. She is openly lesbian.
