= Alia Jaques =

New Zealand field hockey player

Personal information
- Born: 20 May 1995 (age 31) Hamilton, New Zealand

Sport
- Sport: Field hockey
- Position: Midfield
- Club: Midlands
Senior career
Years	Team	Caps	Goals
2014–2018	Midlands	32	7
National team
Years	Team	Caps	Goals
2016	New Zealand U–21	8	(5)
2016–	New Zealand	31	(4)
Medal record
Women's field hockey
Representing New Zealand
Oceania Cup
Silver medal – second place	2023 Whangārei
Junior Oceania Cup
Silver medal – second place	2016 Gold Coast

Alia Jaques (born 20 May 1995) is a New Zealand field hockey player, who plays as a midfielder.

== Personal life ==
Alia Jaques was born and raised in Hamilton, New Zealand. The youngest of three children, Alia has an older brother and older sister.

== Career ==
=== Domestic teams ===
In the New Zealand National Hockey League, Jaques plays for the Midlands women's hockey team.

=== National teams ===
==== Under-21 ====
Throughout her junior career, Alia Jaques was a member of the New Zealand U-21 team on two occasions. She represented the team at the 2016 Junior Oceania Cup on the Gold Coast and at the 2016 FIH Junior World Cup in Santiago.

==== Black Sticks ====
Jaques made her debut for the Black Sticks in 2016 during a test series against Malaysia in Auckland.

During 2019, Jaques represented the New Zealand team during the inaugural tournament of the FIH Pro League.
