= Southern Alpiners =

New Zealand field hockey club

- Full name: Southern Alpiners
- League: Premier Hockey League
- Founded: 2020; 6 years ago
- Home ground: Ngā Puna Wai Sports Hub, Christchurch, New Zealand (Capacity 300)

Personnel
- Coach: Grant Edwards (M); Aaron Ford (W)
- Website: blacksticksnz.co.nz

The Southern Alpiners are a New Zealand based field hockey club, originating from the nation's Southern region. The club was established in 2020, and is one of four established to compete in Hockey New Zealand's new premier domestic competition, the Premier Hockey League.

The club unifies both men and women under one name.

The Southern Alpiners competed for the first time in the inaugural season of Premier Hockey League, where the men's and women's teams finished in second and fourth place in their respective tournaments.

== History ==
Along with three other teams, the Southern Alpiners were founded in 2020 as part of Hockey New Zealand's development of hockey.

The team comprises players from the whole of Te Waipounamu, the South Island of New Zealand. The team are named after the Southern Alps, the mountain range which extends down the majority of the South Island.

== Teams ==
=== Men ===
The following players represented the men's team during the 2020 edition of the Sentinel Homes Premier Hockey League.

1. Louis Beckert (GK)
2. George Enersen (GK)
3. Joseph Morrison
4. George Connell
5. Hugo Inglis
6. Nicholas Elder
7. Kane Russell
8. Nicholas Lidstone
9. Nicholas Ross
10. Maxwell Rasmussen
11. Dominic Newman
12. Gus Wakeling
13. Finn Ward
14. Dylan Thomas
15. Jordan Wards
16. Malachi Buschl
17. Samuel Lane
18. David Brydon
19. Blair Tarrant
20. Simon Yorston
21. Moss Jackson

=== Women ===
The following players represented the women's team during the 2020 edition of the Sentinel Homes Premier Hockey League.

1. Kirsty Nation (GK)
2. Saasha Marsters (GK)
3. Phoebe Steele
4. Olivia Merry
5. Anna Crowley
6. Tessa Jopp
7. Georgina Mackay-Stewart
8. Millie Calder
9. Leah Butt
10. Belinda Smith
11. Hayley Cox
12. Frances Davies
13. Jessica Anderson
14. Catherine Tinning
15. Brittany Wang
16. Emily Wium
17. Margot Willis
18. Michaela Curtis
20. Isabella Ambrosius
21. Charlotte Lee
