= Blair Tarrant =

New Zealand field hockey player

Personal information
- Full name: Blair Thomas Fagan Tarrant
- Born: 11 May 1990 (age 36) Timaru, New Zealand
- Height: 1.85 m (6 ft 1 in)
- Weight: 83 kg (183 lb)

Sport
- Sport: Field hockey
- Position: Defender
Youth career
- Team
- –: Southern Dogs
Senior career
Years	Team	Caps	Goals
–	Southern Dogs	-	-
2012–2013	SCHC	-	-
2013–2015	Southern Dogs	-	-
2016–2020	Rotterdam	-	-
2020–2023	Hamburger Polo Club	-	-
National team
Years	Team	Caps	Goals
2010–present	New Zealand	217	(4)
Medal record
Men's field hockey
Representing New Zealand
Oceania Cup
Silver medal – second place	2013 Stratford
Silver medal – second place	2015 Stratford
Silver medal – second place	2019 Rockhampton
Silver medal – second place	2023 Whangārei
Commonwealth Games
Bronze medal – third place	2010 Delhi	Team
Hockey World League
Silver medal – second place	2012–13 New Delhi	Team

Blair Thomas Fagan Tarrant (born 11 May 1990) is a New Zealand field hockey player who plays as a defender for the New Zealand national team.

He represented his country at the 2016 Summer Olympics in Rio de Janeiro, where the men's team came seventh.

== Club career ==
Tarrant plays as a defender for the Southern region in the New Zealand Hockey League. In 2012, he signed a two-year contract at SCHC in the Netherlands. Due to his commitments to the national team, he would miss the preparation for the second half of the season so in January 2013 his contract at SCHC was annulled and he returned to New Zealand. After the 2016 Summer Olympics he returned to the Netherlands to play for Rotterdam. In April 2020, it was announced he left Rotterdam together with Kane Russell for Hamburger Polo Club in Germany for the 2020–21 season.
