= Aidan Sarikaya =

New Zealand field hockey player (born 1996)

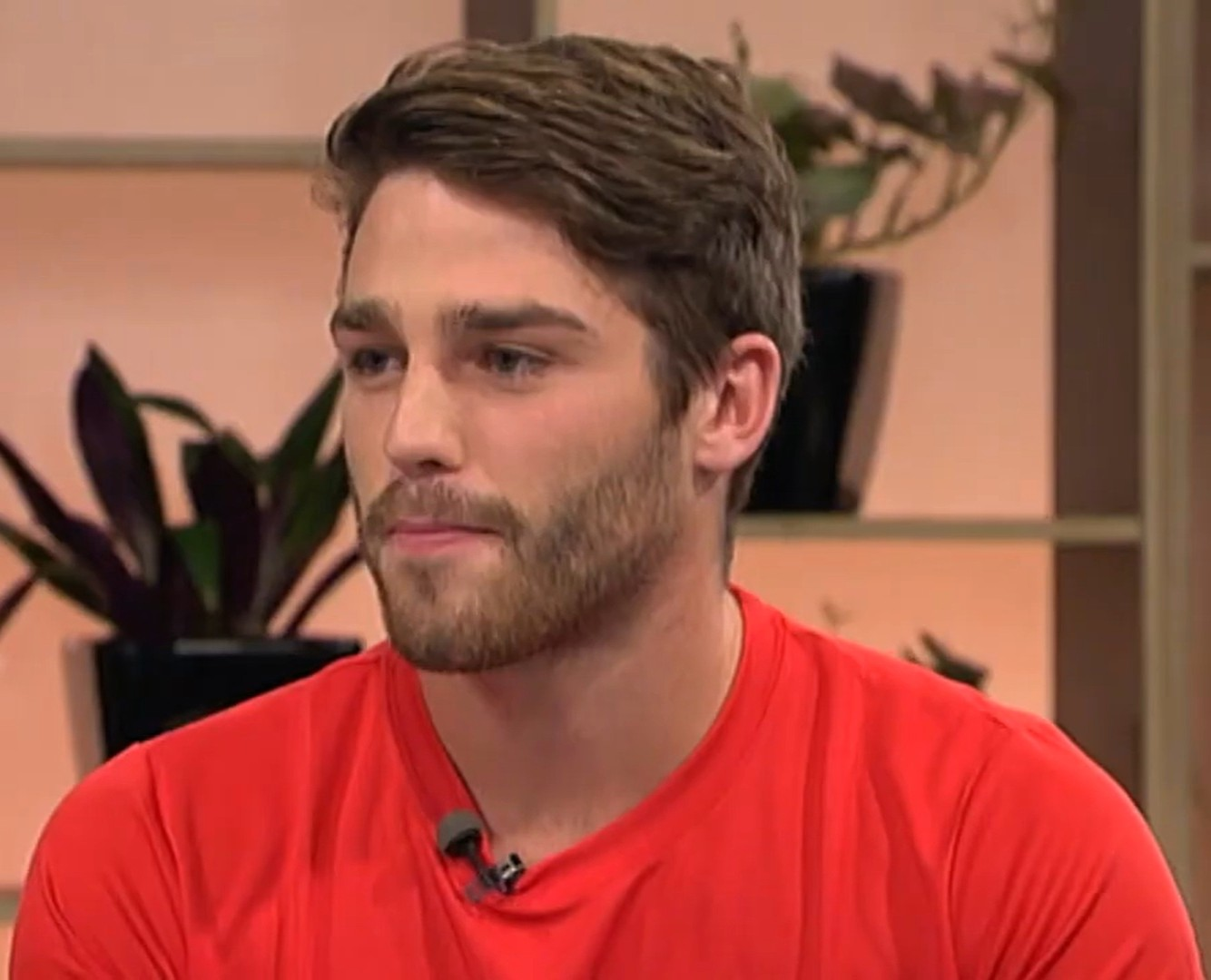
- Sarikaya in 2018

Personal information
- Full name: Aidan Thomas Sarikaya
- Born: 3 July 1996 (age 30)

Sport
- Sport: Field hockey
- Position: Defender / Midfielder
- Club: Herakles
Senior career
Years	Team	Caps	Goals
2015–2018	Midlands	37	4
2019–present	Herakles	-	-
National team
Years	Team	Caps	Goals
2016	New Zealand U21	14	(3)
2017–present	New Zealand	46	(3)
Medal record
Men's field hockey
Representing New Zealand
Commonwealth Games
Silver medal – second place	2018 Gold Coast	Team
Oceania Cup
Silver medal – second place	2023 Whangārei

Aidan Thomas Sarikaya (born 3 July 1996) is a New Zealand field hockey player who plays as a defender or midfielder for Belgian club Herakles and the New Zealand national team.

== Club career ==
Sarikaya played for the Midlands team in the New Zealand National Hockey League. In 2019 he moved to Europe to play for Herkales in Belgium for the 2019–20 season.

== International career ==
=== Junior national team ===
Sarikaya made his debut for the national under 18 team in 2014, at a qualifying event for the 2014 Summer Youth Olympics. Sarikaya again represented the national U18 side at the Youth Olympics, held in Nanjing, China. In 2016, Sarikaya made his debut for the national under 21 team at the Junior Oceania Cup. New Zealand qualified for the Junior World Cup in Lucknow, India, where Sarikaya was also a member of the U21 side.

=== Senior national team ===
Sarikaya made his senior international debut in 2017, at the International Festival of Hockey in Victoria, Australia. In 2018, Sarikaya most notably represented New Zealand at the Commonwealth Games, where New Zealand won a silver medal.
