= Stephanie Dickins =

New Zealand field hockey player

Personal information
- Born: 9 January 1995 (age 31) Āpiti, New Zealand
- Height: 1.75 m (5 ft 9 in)

Sport
- Sport: Field hockey
- Position: Defence
- Club: North Harbour
National team
Years	Team	Caps	Goals
2015–2016	New Zealand U–21	13	(3)
2017–	New Zealand	84	(8)
Medal record
Women's field hockey
Representing New Zealand
Oceania Cup
Gold medal – first place	2019 Rockhampton
Silver medal – second place	2023 Whangārei
FIH Nations Cup
Gold medal – first place	2024–25 Santiago

Stephanie Dickins (born 9 January 1995) is a New Zealand field hockey player, who plays as a defender.

== Personal life ==
Dickins was born and raised in Āpiti, New Zealand.

== Career ==
=== National teams ===
==== Under-21 ====
Throughout her junior career, Dickins was a member of the New Zealand U-21 team on three occasions. She represented the team during a test series in Breda; at the 2016 Junior Oceania Cup on the Gold Coast; and at the 2016 FIH Junior World Cup in Santiago.

==== Black Sticks ====
Dickins made her debut for the Black Sticks in 2017 during a test series against Argentina in Buenos Aires.

During 2019, Dickins represented the New Zealand team during the inaugural tournament of the FIH Pro League. Following the Pro League, Dickins appeared at the Oceania Cup in Rockhampton, where the Black Sticks won gold and gained qualification to the 2020 Summer Olympics.

Dickins was named in the Black Sticks squad for the 2020 calendar year.

=== International goals ===
Goal	Date	Location	Opponent	Score	Result	Competition	Ref.
1	16 May 2017	Waikato Hockey Association, Hamilton, New Zealand	India	8–2	8–2	Test Match	
