= Megan Gibson (field hockey) =

New Zealand field hockey player

Personal information
- Born: 12 May 1996 (age 30) Pongaroa, New Zealand
- Height: 1.65 m (5 ft 5 in)

Sport
- Sport: Field hockey
- Position: Defender
- Club: Capital
National team
Years	Team	Caps	Goals
2015–2016	New Zealand U–21	13	(5)
2016–	New Zealand	85	(10)
Medal record
Women's field hockey
Representing New Zealand
Oceania Cup
Gold medal – first place	2019 Rockhampton
Silver medal – second place	2023 Whangārei

Megan Gibson (née Hull, born 12 May 1996) is a New Zealand field hockey player, who plays as a defender.

== Personal life ==
Megan Hull was born and raised in Pongaroa, New Zealand.

== Career ==
=== National teams ===
==== Under-21 ====
Throughout her junior career, Megan Hull was a member of the New Zealand U-21 team on three occasions. She represented the team during a test series in Breda; at the 2016 Junior Oceania Cup on the Gold Coast; and at the 2016 FIH Junior World Cup in Santiago.

==== Black Sticks ====
Hull made her debut for the Black Sticks in 2016 during a test series against Malaysia in Auckland.

During 2019, Hull represented the New Zealand team during the inaugural tournament of the FIH Pro League. Following the Pro League, Hull appeared at the Oceania Cup in Rockhampton, where the Black Sticks won gold and gained qualification to the 2020 Summer Olympics.

=== International goals ===
Goal	Date	Location	Opponent	Score	Result	Competition	Ref.
1	5 September 2019	Kalka Shades Hockey Fields, Rockhampton, Australia	Australia	1–0	3–1	2019 Oceania Cup	
2	15 May 2022	National Hockey Centre, Auckland, New Zealand	Australia	1–0	1–2	2022 Trans–Tasman Series	
3	29 July 2022	University of Birmingham, Birmingham, England	Kenya	4–0	16–0	XXII Commonwealth Games	
4	29 July 2022	University of Birmingham, Birmingham, England	Kenya	8–0	16–0	XXII Commonwealth Games	
5	25 February 2023	National Hockey Stadium, Wellington, New Zealand	United States	1–0	4–1	2022–23 FIH Pro League	
6	25 February 2023	National Hockey Stadium, Wellington, New Zealand	United States	4–1	4–1	2022–23 FIH Pro League	
7	9 December 2023	United States Performance Centre, Charlotte, United States	United States	1–1	4–3	Test Match	
8	10 December 2023	United States Performance Centre, Charlotte, United States	United States	1–3	4–5	Test Match	
9	14 January 2024	Jaipal Singh Stadium, Ranchi, India	India	1–1	1–3	2024 FIH Olympic Qualifiers	
10	6 June 2024	Estadi Martí Colomer, Terrassa, Spain	Canada	1–0	2–0	2023–24 FIH Nations Cup	
