= Julia King (field hockey) =

New Zealand field hockey player

Personal information
- Born: 8 December 1992 (age 33) Auckland, New Zealand
- Height: 1.67 m (5 ft 6 in)
- Weight: 60 kg (132 lb)

Sport
- Sport: Field hockey
- Position: Midfield / Forward
Senior career
Years	Team	Caps	Goals
?–present	Auckland Fury	-	-
National team
Years	Team	Caps	Goals
2011–	New Zealand	42	(3)
Medal record
Oceania Cup
Gold medal – first place	2019 Rockhampton
Silver medal – second place	2023 Whangārei

Julia King (born 8 December 1992) is a New Zealand field hockey player. She has competed for the New Zealand women's national field hockey team (the Black Sticks Women) since 2011. She was a travelling reserve player for the team during the 2012 Summer Olympics. She participated at the 2020 Women's FIH Pro League.

== Life ==
Born in Auckland, King attended St Cuthbert's College.
