= Holly Pearson =

New Zealand field hockey player

Personal information
- Born: 7 September 1998 (age 27) Taranaki, New Zealand

Sport
- Sport: Field hockey
- Position: Forward
- Club: Central
National team
Years	Team	Caps	Goals
2018–2019	New Zealand U–21	7	(3)
2019–	New Zealand	39	(4)
Medal record
Women's field hockey
Representing New Zealand
Oceania Cup
Gold medal – first place	2019 Rockhampton	Team
FIH Nations Cup
Gold medal – first place	2024–25 Santiago

Holly Pearson (born 7 September 1998) is a field hockey player from New Zealand, who plays as a forward.

== Career ==
=== National teams ===
==== Under–21 ====
Holly Pearson debuted for the New Zealand U–21 team in 2018 during a test series against Australia in Hastings, New Zealand. During the series she finished as highest scorer.

She followed this up with an appearance during a Tri-Nations Tournament in Canberra, Australia in 2019, competing against Australia and India.

==== Black Sticks ====
Pearson made her debut for the Black Sticks in 2019 during Season One of the FIH Pro League. Following the Pro League, Pearson appeared at the Oceania Cup in Rockhampton, where the Black Sticks won gold and gained qualification to the 2020 Summer Olympics.
