= Kaitlin Cotter =

New Zealand field hockey player

Personal information
- Born: 14 November 2001 (age 25) Hastings, New Zealand
- Height: 178 cm (5 ft 10 in)
- Weight: 73

Sport
- Sport: Field hockey
- Position: Defender
National team
Years	Team	Caps	Goals
2018–2019	New Zealand U–21	7	(0)
2020–	New Zealand	49	(5)
Medal record
Women's field hockey
Representing New Zealand
FIH Nations Cup
Gold medal – first place	2024–25 Santiago

Kaitlin Cotter (born 14 November 2001) is a field hockey player from New Zealand, who plays as a defender.

== Personal life ==
Kaitlin Cotter was born in Hastings and grew up in Napier.

== Career ==
=== Under-21 ===
Kaitlin Cotter made her debut for the New Zealand U-21 team in 2018 during a test series against Australia in Hastings.

The following year she appeared at a Tri–Nations tournament in Canberra.

=== Black Sticks ===
Cotter made her debut for the Black Sticks in 2020 during season three of the FIH Pro League.

Due to travel restrictions during the COVID-19 pandemic, Cotter did not represent the national team again until 2022. She was a member of the squad at the Trans–Tasman Hockey Series in Auckland. Later that year she was named in the national squad for both the FIH World Cup in Terrassa and Amsterdam, as well as the XXII Commonwealth Games in Birmingham.
