= Olivia Shannon =

New Zealand field hockey player

Personal information
- Born: 23 May 2001 (age 25) Feilding, New Zealand
- Height: 1.65 m (5 ft 5 in)

Sport
- Sport: Field hockey
- Position: Forward
- Club: Central
National team
Years	Team	Caps	Goals
2019–2020	New Zealand U–21	4	(3)
2019–	New Zealand	101	(19)
Medal record
Women's field hockey
Representing New Zealand
Oceania Cup
Gold medal – first place	2019 Rockhampton
Gold medal – first place	2025 Darwin
Silver medal – second place	2023 Whangārei
FIH Nations Cup
Gold medal – first place	2024–25 Santiago
Silver medal – second place	2025–26 Auckland

Olivia Shannon (born 23 May 2001) is a New Zealand field hockey player.

== Early life and education ==
Shannon grew up on a farm in rural Manawatū, New Zealand. She played rugby until age 12. She began playing field hockey at age 11.

== Field hockey career ==
Shannon plays the position of striker in field hockey. Shannon began playing for Central's under-18 team at age 14. In 2018, Shannon played for Central in the New Zealand national under 18 tournament. She was top goal scorer of the tournament and her performance led to her being named player of the tournament and helped her team defend the championship. She also led her school, Havelock North's Iona College, to a national secondary school field hockey title. Her performance for the school led to Shannon being named Central Hockey U18 Women's Player of the Year for 2018. In late 2018, Shannon was named to the Black Sticks, New Zealand's national women's field hockey team. Shannon was the youngest player named to the team's 2019 line-up.
