= Hope Ralph =

New Zealand field hockey player

Personal information
- Born: 14 April 2000 (age 26) Taranaki, New Zealand
- Height: 1.62 m (5 ft 4 in)

Sport
- Sport: Field hockey
- Position: Forward
- Club: Central
Senior career
Years	Team	Caps	Goals
2017–	Central	20	7
National team
Years	Team	Caps	Goals
2018–	New Zealand U–21	7	(5)
2020–	New Zealand	8	(2)
Medal record
Women's field hockey
Representing New Zealand
Oceania Cup
Silver medal – second place	2023 Whangārei

Hope Ralph (born 14 April 2000) is a New Zealand field hockey player, who plays as a forward. She attended Sacred Heart Girls' College in New Plymouth.

== Career ==
=== Domestic league ===
In the Ford National Hockey League, Ralph plays for Central.

=== National teams ===
==== Under-21 ====
Hope Ralph made her debut for the New Zealand U-21 team in 2018 during a Trans–Tasman test series against Australia in Hastings. She followed this up with an appearance at a Tri–Nations tournament in Canberra in December 2019.

==== Black Sticks ====
Ralph made her senior debut for the Black Sticks in 2020, during the second season of the FIH Pro League. She was also selected for the Black Sticks side who travelled to the 2020 Summer Olympics in Tokyo. She scored a goal in her Olympic debut as the team won against Argentina.

=== Awards ===
Ralph was selected to be part of the Future Champions programme administered by Sport Taranaki in 2017. Ralph was a recipient of a Prime Minister's Athlete Scholarship in 2021 and was also named the AUT Sportswoman of the Year in 2021 which recognised her "high academic ability, outstanding athletic performance, and community contribution."

=== International goals ===
Goal	Date	Location	Opponent	Score	Result	Competition	Ref.
1	28 February 2020	Ngā Puna Wai Sports Hub, Christchurch, New Zealand	Argentina	1–0	1–1	2020 FIH Pro League	
2	1 March 2020	Ngā Puna Wai Sports Hub, Christchurch, New Zealand	Argentina	4–2	5–3	2020 FIH Pro League	
