= New Zealand Hockey Federation =

Governing body of field hockey in New Zealand

Hockey New Zealand
- Sport: Field hockey
- Jurisdiction: New Zealand
- Affiliation: International Hockey Federation (FIH)
- Regional affiliation: Oceania Hockey Federation (OHF)
- Headquarters: Rosedale, Auckland
- President: Pam Elgar
- Chairman: Sharon Williamson
- CEO: Anthony Crummy
- Vice president: Dr Dennis Slade
- Men's coach: Greg Nicol (national)
- Women's coach: Phil Burrows (national)
- Operating income: NZ$7.12 million (2016)

Official website
- www.hockeynz.co.nz
- (New Zealand)

New Zealand Hockey Federation Incorporated, also known as Hockey New Zealand, is the governing body overseeing, promoting and managing the sport of field hockey in New Zealand. It is a full member of the International Hockey Federation (FIH) and the Oceania Hockey Federation (OHF).

The federation comprises 32 provincial hockey associations, organised into 8 regions, which between them had 48,174 registered players in the 2013 winter season.

== Origin ==
In 1902 in Christchurch, the New Zealand Hockey Association (NZHA) was founded by six provincial associations. Later, in 1908, the New Zealand Ladies Hockey Association (NZLHA) was formed in Wellington. Until 1989, the men's and women's associations were administrated separately. However, both associations then merged to create the New Zealand Hockey Federation (nowadays called Hockey New Zealand).

== Hockey in New Zealand ==
Hockey in New Zealand started appearing during the early years of European settlement. Even if today hockey is accepted all over the country, between the 1870s and the 1880s, the sport was not welcomed everywhere and seen as a disturbance to peace. Nevertheless, the first hockey club Dunedin Hockey Club was founded in 1876 (but defunct by mid 1880s). After that, many different associations were formed, and the earliest inter-club match recorded Kaiapoi Hockey Club beating Papanui Rovers 5-0 in 1895. In 1907, the first New Zealand Challenge Shield took place, and was long dominated by Auckland and Wellington.

By 1939, hockey in New Zealand counted 4,600 registered players and so the New Zealand Secondary Schools Hockey Association (NZSSHA) was formed by the end of the 1930s. During the Second World War, Provincial Men's hockey was not played, and Women's hockey only resumed in 1943.

By 1959, following the first Olympic Games participation, New Zealand counted 11,927 Men players and 7,453 Women. Nowadays, New Zealand counts 58,006 winter players and 24,938 summer players of which 51% are female and 49% male (2017).

== New Zealand at international tournaments ==
The first World War intervened with international competitions and therefore, the Men's team played their first inaugural Test Match against Australia in 1922 and the Women's team in 1935 where they lost. Women's hockey grew after the war and the first female umpire was appointed in 1934.

The Men's team participated for the first time in the Olympic Games in 1956 in Melbourne and ended on the 6th place. They continued participating in the Olympic Games in Rome (1960), Tokyo (1984), Mexico (1998), Munich (1972) and finally in Montreal (1976) where they won their first gold medal, beating Australia 1-0 in the final. During that time, the Women's team competed in the International Federation of Women's Hockey Associations (IFWHA) tournaments in London (1953), Australia (1956), Scotland (1959), USA (1963), where they stayed undefeated in all 6 matches. They also participated in the IFWHA tournaments in Amsterdam (1973) and in Scotland (1975).

In 1984, in Los Angeles, the Women's team appeared at the Olympic Games for the first time. Followed by this, in 1988, hockey was played for the first time in the Commonwealth Games: The Men's team did not participate; however, the Women's team won the bronze medal. In 1991, Auckland hosted the Olympic Qualifying Tournament for both men and women and counting 24 teams. This was the largest tournament of its kind and both teams qualified for the Barcelona 1992 Olympics and both ended on the 8th place.

After not qualifying for two Olympic Games in a row, the men won the silver medal during the Manchester 2002 Commonwealth Games. After this, both teams participated in all later Olympic Games. During the 2010 New Delhi Commonwealth Games, both teams won medals: The Women's team ended on the 2nd place and the Men's team on the 3rd place. The women's teams also won the bronze medal during the 2014 Glasgow Commonwealth Games and the gold medal during the 2018 Gold Coast Commonwealth Games.

== National teams ==
Hockey New Zealand oversees New Zealand's national field hockey teams.

- Black Sticks Men
- Black Sticks Women
- Junior Black Sticks Men (under 21)
- Junior Black Sticks Women (under 21)
- New Zealand men's under 18 team
- New Zealand women's under 18 team

== Provincial associations ==
North Island

Northland

- Northland Hockey Association
- Bay of Islands Hockey Association

North Harbour

- North Harbour Hockey Association

Auckland

- Auckland Hockey Association

Midlands

- Counties Manukau Hockey Association
- Thames Valley Hockey Association
- Waikato Hockey Association
- Tauranga Hockey Association
- Bay of Plenty Hockey Association

Central

- Poverty Bay Hockey Association
- Taranaki Hockey Federation
- Hawke's Bay Hockey Association
- Wanganui Hockey Association
- Central Hawke's Bay Hockey Association
- Rangitikei Hockey Association
- Manawatu Hockey Association
- Horowhenua Hockey Association
- Ruahine-Dannevirke Hockey Association

Capital

- Wairarapa Hockey Association
- Wellington Hockey Association

South Island

Capital

- Nelson Hockey Association
- Marlborough Hockey Association
- Buller Hockey Association

Canterbury

- West Coast Hockey Association
- Canterbury Hockey Association
- Malvern Hockey Association
- Mid Canterbury Hockey Association
- South Canterbury Hockey Association

Southern

- North Otago Hockey Association
- Central Otago Hockey Association
- Otago Hockey Association
- Southland Hockey Association
- Invercargill Hockey Association

== Competitions ==
Hockey New Zealand has a both men and women's competitions for all ages running throughout the whole year.

- PHL – Premier Hockey League
- National Senior Tournament
- National Masters Tournament (35+, 40+, 45+, 50+, 55+, 60+, 65+)
- National U18 Tournament
- National U15 Tournaments
- National U13 Tournaments
- Secondary School Tournaments

== See also ==
- 2018 Women's Tri-Nations Hockey Tournament
- Black Sticks Women
- Black Sticks Men
