= Northern Tridents =

New Zealand field hockey club

- Full name: Northern Tridents
- Nickname(s): Tridents
- League: Premier Hockey League
- Founded: 2020; 6 years ago
- Home ground: National Hockey Centre, Auckland, New Zealand (Capacity 500)

Personnel
- Coach: Bryce Collins (M); Emily Hurtz (W)
- Website: blacksticksnz.co.nz tridents.co.nz

The Northern Tridents are a New Zealand based field hockey club, originating in the nation's northern most region. The club was established in 2020, and is one of four established to compete in Hockey New Zealand's new premier domestic competition, the Premier Hockey League.

The club unifies both men and women under one name.

The Northern Tridents competed for the first time in the inaugural season of Premier Hockey League, where the men's and women's teams finished fourth and second in their respective tournaments.

== 2024 Season ==
The Northern Tridents are set to compete in the 2024 edition of the Premier Hockey League, which begins on 2 November 2024. The team continues to represent the northern region of New Zealand, spanning from the Bombays through to the far North.

The draw for the 2024 season has been released, and fans can now view the full schedule on the Tridents' official website.

== History ==
Founded in 2020, the Northern Tridents emerged as one of four new teams created to enhance the development of hockey under the guidance of Hockey New Zealand. This initiative aimed to bolster the sport's popularity and accessibility throughout the country.

The Tridents represent the region from the Bombays through to the far North, uniting a diverse and vibrant area that showcases stunning landscapes and thriving communities. The team is compiled with talents across Northland to Auckland. Drawing inspiration from the breathtaking ocean vistas of New Zealand's northern regions, the team’s name pays homage to the trident of Poseidon, the revered Greek God of the sea, symbolising strength, power, and a deep connection to the maritime environment.

== Teams ==
=== Men ===
The following players represented the men's team during the 2024 edition of the Sentinel Homes Premier Hockey League.

1. Robbie Capizzi
2. Luka Clark
3. Scott Cosslett
4. James Coughlan (field hockey)
5. Aiden Fraser
6. Zander Fraser
7. Hayden Ganley (GK)
8. Angus Griffin (GK)
9. James Hickson
10. Luke Holmes
11. Isaac Houlbrooke
12. Rocco Ludolph
13. Liam Mortimer
14. Jared Panchia
15. Ryan Parr
16. Jayshan Randhawa
17. Netesh Sukha
18. Charl Ulrich
19. Maks Wyndham-Smith

=== Women ===
The following players represented the women's team during the 2024 edition of the Sentinel Homes Premier Hockey League.

1. Paige Blake
2. Breana Catley
3. Brodie Cochrane
4. Saffy Cribb
5. Kaea Elliott
6. Tyla Goodsell-Matthews
7. Claudia Hanham
8. Maddie Harris
9. Sophie Hildesley
10. Holly Hilton-Jones
11. Ella Hyatt Brown
12. Emilie Logan
13. Beth Norman
14. Pippa Norman
15. Holly Pearson
16. Brooke Roberts (GK)
17. Georgie Shotter
18. Petrea Webster
19. Charlie Wills
20. Ruby Worrall
