= New Zealand Premier Hockey League =

Field hockey competition in Australia

Premier Hockey League
- Formerly: New Zealand National Hockey League
- Sport: Field hockey
- Founded: 2020
- No. of teams: 4
- Country: New Zealand
- Continent: Oceania (OHF)
- Most recent champions: Central Falcons (M & W)
- Website: www.premierhockeyleague.co.nz

The Premier Hockey League an annual field hockey competition. The league serves as New Zealand's premier domestic hockey league, helping unearth future talent for selection to the country's national teams; the Vantage Black Sticks.

The Central Falcons were the inaugural tournament champions in both the men's and women's editions, taking out the 2020 titles.

== History ==
The Premier Hockey League was founded in 2020. The tournament was formed as a response to Hockey New Zealand needing to provide their top players elite-level hockey, with the Black Sticks being unable to travel due to the country's COVID restrictions.

In 2020, it was confirmed that the league had secured a major partnership with Sentinel Homes, with naming rights also afforded to the company, forming the Sentinel Homes Premier Hockey League.

Following a four-year break in competition, the league will return in 2024. The league will now be privately run, with a focus on being a franchise-based competition.

== Format ==
=== Teams ===
- Central Falcons
- Hauraki Mavericks
- Northern Tridents
- Southern Alpiners

== Men's tournament ==
=== Summaries ===
Year	Finals Host	Gold Medal Match			Third and Fourth		
Year	Finals Host	Champions	Score	Runners-up	3rd place	Score	4th place
2020	Hamilton, New Zealand	Central Falcons	1–1 (1–0 pen.)	Southern Alpiners	Hauraki Mavericks	4–1	Northern Tridents
2024	Auckland, New Zealand	Southern Alpiners	7–4	Central Falcons	Northern Tridents	4–3	Hauraki Mavericks
2025	Auckland, New Zealand	Southern Alpiners	5–1	Hauraki Mavericks	Central Falcons	5–3	Northern Tridents

== Women's tournament ==
=== Summaries ===
Year	Hosts	Gold Medal Match			Third and Fourth		
Year	Hosts	Champions	Score	Runners-up	3rd place	Score	4th place
2020	Hamilton, New Zealand	Central Falcons	3–1	Northern Tridents	Hauraki Mavericks	1–0	Southern Alpiners
2024	Auckland, New Zealand	Central Falcons	5–1	Northern Tridents	Southern Alpiners	6–1	Hauraki Mavericks
2025	Auckland, New Zealand	Northern Tridents	3–2	Central Falcons	Southern Alpiners	0–0 (1–0 pen.)	Hauraki Mavericks

== Awards ==
In both the men's and women's competitions, Hockey New Zealand presents a most valuable player (MVP) award at the conclusion of the tournament. The name of each trophy comes from that of past Black Sticks players. The men's trophy is named after father and son, Jeff and Ryan Archibald, forming the Archibald Trophy, while the women's trophy is named after Suzie Muirhead.

Winners of both the Archibald and Muirhead trophies are listed below.

Most Valuable Player Trophies
Year	Archibald Trophy	Muirhead Trophy
2020	Jacob Smith (Falcons)	Stacey Michelsen (Tridents)

== See also ==
- Hockey New Zealand
- New Zealand National Hockey League
