= 2018 Men's Ford National Hockey League =

20th edition of the men's field hockey tournament

Tournament details
- Host country: New Zealand
- Dates: 9–23 September
- Teams: 8
- Venue: 5 (in 4 host cities)

Final positions
- Champions: –– Capital (5th title)
- Runner-up: –– North Harbour
- Third place: –– Canterbury

Tournament statistics
- Matches played: 27
- Goals scored: 140 (5.19 per match)
- Top scorer: –– Cory Bennett (11 goals)
- Best player: –– Dane Lett

The 2018 Men's Ford National Hockey League was the 20th edition of the men's field hockey tournament. The competition was held in various cities across New Zealand, from 9 to 23 September.

Capital won the title for the fifth time, defeating North Harbour 3–2 in penalties, after the final finished as a 1–1 draw. Canterbury finished in third place after defeating Auckland 6–1.

== Participating teams ==
The following eight teams competed for the title:

- –– Auckland
- –– Canterbury
- –– Capital
- –– Central
- –– Midlands
- –– North Harbour
- –– Southern

== Results ==
All times are local (NZST).

=== Preliminary round ===
Pos	Team	Pld	W	WD	LD	L	GF	GA	GD	Pts	Qualification
1	–– Canterbury	6	3	2	0	1	18	12	+6	16	Advanced to Semi-Finals
2	–– Capital	6	3	0	2	1	17	11	+6	14	Advanced to Semi-Finals
3	–– Auckland	6	3	1	0	2	11	7	+4	14	Advanced to Semi-Finals
4	–– North Harbour	6	2	1	2	1	26	17	+9	12	Advanced to Semi-Finals
5	–– Central	6	2	0	1	3	15	20	−5	9	
6	–– Midlands	6	2	0	0	4	12	22	−10	8	
7	–– Southern	6	1	1	0	4	10	20	−10	6	

Source: Hockey New Zealand
Rules for classification: 1) points; 2) matches won; 3) goal difference; 4) goals for; 5) head-to-head result; 6) field goals scored.

==== Fixtures ====
9 September 2018
13:30

Southern ––	1–5	–– Canterbury
Ward 40'	Report	Lane 6', 40', 42'; Brydon 15'; Summers 53'

McMillan Hockey Centre, Dunedin
Umpires:
Bevan Nichol (NZL)
Nicholas Saunders (NZL)

9 September 2018
14:00

Midlands ––	1–0	–– Auckland
Weber 6'	Report

Gallagher Hockey Centre, Hamilton
Umpires:
Benjamin Wilson (NZL)
Lee Erskine (NZL)

9 September 2018
14:00

Capital ––	5–0	–– Central
Kepes 14', 44'; Lett 29'; Finlayson 53'; Miskimmin 60'	Report

National Hockey Stadium, Wellington
Umpires:
David Tomlinson (NZL)
Simon Taylor (NZL)

11 September 2018
19:30

Auckland ––	3–3	–– North Harbour
Crooks 8', 15'; Keaney 15'	Report	Bennett 26', 32', 50'
Penalties
McGeorge (penalty shoot-out scored); Keaney (penalty shoot-out missed); O'Connor (penalty shoot-out missed); Fraser (penalty shoot-out scored)	2–0	(penalty shoot-out missed) S. Edwards; (penalty shoot-out missed) Guy; (penalty shoot-out missed) Jeram; (penalty shoot-out missed) Symonds

Lloyd Elsmore Hockey Stadium, Auckland
Umpires:
Bruce Brownsey (NZL)
Bevan Nichol (NZL)

13 September 2018
19:30

North Harbour ––	10–2	–– Midlands
S. Edwards 5', 50'; Bennett 7'; Greentree 30'; B. Edwards 35'; Capizzi 42', 57'; Hendricks 54'; Wild 57'; Jeram 58'	Report	Weber 38'; Scanlon 50'

North Harbour Hockey Stadium, Auckland
Umpires:
Simon Taylor (NZL)
Bruce Brownsey (NZL)

15 September 2018
12:00

Canterbury ––	2–0	–– Auckland
Brydon 28'; Bain 55'	Report

National Hockey Stadium, Wellington
Umpires:
Benjamin Grant (NZL)
Simon Taylor (NZL)

15 September 2018
14:00

Southern ––	0–3	–– Central
	Report	Thomas 20', 59'; Hiha 50'

National Hockey Stadium, Wellington
Umpires:
Bevan Nichol (NZL)
Bruce Brownsey (NZL)

15 September 2018
16:30

North Harbour ––	2–3	–– Capital
Bennett 29'; Capizzi 40'	Report	Harris 20'; Yeo 24'; Finlayson 43'

National Hockey Stadium, Wellington
Umpires:
Nicholas Saunders (NZL)
David Tomlinson (NZL)

16 September 2018
12:30

Canterbury ––	3–2	–– Midlands
Pollard 3'; Summers 10'; Bain 26'	Report	Weber 29'; Wyndham-Smith 58'

National Hockey Stadium, Wellington
Umpires:
David Tomlinson (NZL)
Lee Erskine (NZL)

16 September 2018
16:30

Central ––	1–4	–– Auckland
Peel 13'	Report	Smith 25', 43', 55'; A. Panchia 37'

National Hockey Stadium, Wellington
Umpires:
Benjamin Grant (NZL)
Nicholas Saunders (NZL)

17 September 2018
11:00

Southern ––	2–4	–– North Harbour
Thomas 13'; Davidson 58'	Report	Jeram 21'; Bennett 38', 44'; Bartholomew 55'

National Hockey Stadium, Wellington
Umpires:
Bevan Nichol (NZL)
Benjamin Grant (NZL)

17 September 2018
13:00

Capital ––	3–1	–– Midlands
MacIntyre 26'; Buddle 54'; Harris 55'	Report	Wyndham-Smith 25'

National Hockey Stadium, Wellington
Umpires:
Simon Taylor (NZL)
Bruce Brownsey (NZL)

18 September 2018
11:00

Central ––	4–4	–– North Harbour
Cohen 9'; McAleese 28'; Phillips 46'; Peel 60'	Report	Bennett 29', 49'; Capizzi 39'; S. Edwards 46'
Penalties
McAleese (penalty shoot-out missed); Hiha (penalty shoot-out missed); Thomas (penalty shoot-out scored); Atkinson (penalty shoot-out missed); Cronin (penalty shoot-out scored) —— Thomas (penalty shoot-out missed); McAleese (penalty shoot-out missed)	2–3	(penalty shoot-out scored) Muir; (penalty shoot-out scored) Capizzi; (penalty shoot-out missed) Jeram; (penalty shoot-out missed) Coughlan; (penalty shoot-out missed) Symonds —— (penalty shoot-out missed) Muir; (penalty shoot-out scored) Capizzi

National Hockey Stadium, Wellington
Umpires:
Bruce Brownsey (NZL)
Nicholas Saunders (NZL)

18 September 2018
13:00

Auckland ––	2–0	–– Southern
Hami-Jones 45'; McGeorge 53'	Report

National Hockey Stadium, Wellington
Umpires:
Bevan Nichol (NZL)
Lee Erskine (NZL)

18 September 2018
15:00

Canterbury ––	2–2	–– Capital
Brydon 24'; Lane 58'	Report	MacIntyre 8'; Harris 60'
Penalties
Pollard (penalty shoot-out scored); Lane (penalty shoot-out scored); Newman (penalty shoot-out scored); Bain (penalty shoot-out missed)	3–2	(penalty shoot-out scored) Hilton; (penalty shoot-out missed) Harris; (penalty shoot-out missed) Miskimmin; (penalty shoot-out scored) Lett; (penalty shoot-out missed) Van Woerkom

National Hockey Stadium, Wellington
Umpires:
Benjamin Grant (NZL)
David Tomlinson (NZL)

19 September 2018
15:00

Central ––	4–3	–– Canterbury
Thomas 19', 45'; Peel 43'; Phillips 53'	Report	Lane 7'; Darling 30'; Pollard 51'

National Hockey Stadium, Wellington
Umpires:
Lee Erskine (NZL)
Bevan Nichol (NZL)

19 September 2018
17:00

Midlands ––	2–3	–– Southern
Milicich 11'; Weber 59'	Report	Buschl 9'; Gilbert 45', 48'

National Hockey Stadium, Wellington
Umpires:
David Tomlinson (NZL)
Bruce Brownsey (NZL)

19 September 2018
19:00

Auckland ––	2–0	–– Capital
A. Panchia 17'; Crooks 35'	Report

National Hockey Stadium, Wellington
Umpires:
Simon Taylor (NZL)
Benjamin Grant (NZL)

20 September 2018
17:00

Midlands ––	4–3	–– Central
Weber 3', 10'; Wyndham-Smith 11'; Neild 37'	Report	Thomas 19', 47'; Phillips 52'

National Hockey Stadium, Wellington
Umpires:
Nicholas Saunders (NZL)
Simon Taylor (NZL)

20 September 2018
19:00

North Harbour ––	3–3	–– Canterbury
Wild 15'; Muir 31'; Bennett 53'	Report	Jackson 18'; Newman 39'; Bain 50'
Penalties
Muir (penalty shoot-out missed); Guy (penalty shoot-out missed); Capizzi (penalty shoot-out missed)	0–3	(penalty shoot-out scored) Pollard; (penalty shoot-out scored) Newman; (penalty shoot-out scored) Bain

National Hockey Stadium, Wellington
Umpires:
Bevan Nichol (NZL)
David Tomlinson (NZL)

21 September 2018
19:00

Capital ––	4–4	–– Southern
Yeo 11'; Lett 41', 60'; Van Woerkom 60'	Report	Ward 20'; Davidson 33'; Gilbert 44'; Thomas 53'
Penalties
Buckley (penalty shoot-out missed); Buddle (penalty shoot-out missed); Bolhuis (penalty shoot-out missed); Finlayson (penalty shoot-out scored); Jongejan (penalty shoot-out missed)	1–2	(penalty shoot-out scored) Ward; (penalty shoot-out scored) Davidson; (penalty shoot-out missed) Thorn; (penalty shoot-out missed) Buschl

National Hockey Stadium, Wellington
Umpires:
Lee Erskine (NZL)
Bevan Nichol (NZL)

=== Classification round ===
==== Fifth to seventh place classification ====
Crossover
22 September 2018
–– Midlands	3
–– Southern	2

Fifth Place
23 September 2018
–– Central	7
–– Midlands	2

===== Crossover =====
22 September 2018
12:15

Midlands ––	3–2	–– Southern
Weber 9'; Herewini 42'; Milicich 42'	Report	Gilbert 27'; Ward 54'

National Hockey Stadium, Wellington
Umpires:
Nicholas Saunders (NZL)
Bevan Nichol (NZL)

===== Fifth and sixth place =====
23 September 2018
11:30

Central ––	7–2	–– Midlands
Spackman 7'; Peel 10'; Atkinson 21', 39'; Hanks 22'; Thomas 37', 52'	Report	Andrews 24'; Weber 51'

National Hockey Stadium, Wellington
Umpires:
Benjamin Grant (NZL)
Bruce Brownsey (NZL)

==== First to fourth place classification ====
Semi-Finals
22 September 2018
–– Canterbury	2
–– North Harbour	3
22 September 2018
–– Capital	2
–– Auckland	1

Final
23 September 2018
–– North Harbour	1 (2)
–– Capital (pen.)	1 (3)
Third Place
23 September 2018
–– Canterbury	6
–– Auckland	1

===== Semi-finals =====
22 September 2018
14:00

Canterbury ––	2–3	–– North Harbour
Pollard 7', 49'	Report	Capizzi 23'; Jeram 29'; Bennett 34'

National Hockey Stadium, Wellington
Umpires:
David Tomlinson (NZL)
Lee Erskine (NZL)

22 September 2018
16:00

Capital ––	2–1	–– Auckland
Lett 60'; Jongejan 60'	Report	Smith 53'

National Hockey Stadium, Wellington
Umpires:
Simon Taylor (NZL)
Benjamin Grant (NZL)

===== Third and fourth place =====
23 September 2018
11:45

Canterbury ––	6–1	–– Auckland
Bain 2', 30'; Lane 5', 54', 57'; Pollard 22'	Report	Smith 49'

National Hockey Stadium, Wellington
Umpires:
Lee Erskine (NZL)
Bevan Nichol (NZL)

===== Final =====
23 September 2018
16:00

North Harbour ––	1–1	–– Capital
Jeram 57'	Report	Buddle 3'
Penalties
Coughlan (penalty shoot-out scored); Capizzi (penalty shoot-out missed); Jeram (penalty shoot-out missed); Edwards (penalty shoot-out missed); Muir (penalty shoot-out scored) —— Jeram (penalty shoot-out missed)	2–3	(penalty shoot-out missed) Hilton; (penalty shoot-out scored) Van Woerkom; (penalty shoot-out scored) Miskimmin; (penalty shoot-out missed) Lett; (penalty shoot-out missed) Harris —— (penalty shoot-out scored) Van Woerkom

National Hockey Stadium, Wellington
Umpires:
Simon Taylor (NZL)
David Tomlinson (NZL)

== Statistics ==
=== Final standings ===
Pos	Team	Pld	W	WD	LD	L	GF	GA	GD	Pts	Qualification
1st place, gold medalist(s)	–– Capital	8	4	1	2	1	20	13	+7	20	Gold Medal
2nd place, silver medalist(s)	–– North Harbour	8	3	1	3	1	30	20	+10	17	Silver Medal
3rd place, bronze medalist(s)	–– Canterbury	8	4	2	0	2	26	16	+10	20	Bronze Medal
4	–– Auckland	8	3	1	0	4	13	15	−2	14	
5	–– Central	7	3	0	1	3	22	22	0	13	
6	–– Midlands	8	3	0	0	5	17	31	−14	12	
7	–– Southern	7	1	1	0	5	12	23	−11	6	

Source: Hockey New Zealand

=== Goalscorers ===
There were 140 goals scored in 27 matches, for an average of 5.19 goals per match.

11 goals

- –– Cory Bennett

8 goals

- –– Samuel Lane
- –– Dylan Thomas
- –– Mark Weber

5 goals

- –– Jacob Smith
- –– Richard Bain
- –– Joshua Pollard
- –– Robert Capizzi

4 goals

- –– Dane Lett
- –– Jason Peel
- –– Kalyan Jeram
- –– Jack Gilbert

3 goals

- –– Joseph Crooks
- –– David Brydon
- –– Daniel Harris
- –– Hayden Phillips
- –– Maks Wyndham-Smith
- –– Steven Edwards
- –– Finn Ward

2 goals

- –– Arun Panchia
- –– Trent Summers
- –– Sebastian Buddle
- –– Nicholas Finlayson
- –– Gabriel Kepes
- –– Oliver MacIntyre
- –– Rowan Yeo
- –– Martin Atkinson
- –– Stirling Milicich
- –– Warren Wild
- –– Lachlan Davidson
- –– Dylan Thomas

1 goal

- –– Tarrant Hami-Jones
- –– Jonathan Keaney
- –– Hamish McGeorge
- –– Lawrence Darling
- –– Moss Jackson
- –– Dominic Newman
- –– Daan Jongejan
- –– Harrison Miskimmin
- –– Benedict van Woerkom
- –– Jordan Cohen
- –– Joseph Hanks
- –– Samuel Hiha
- –– Shea McAleese
- –– Dion Spackman
- –– Reuben Andrews
- –– Connor Herewini
- –– Timothy Neild
- –– Daniel Scanlon
- –– Joseph Bartholomew
- –– Benji Edwards
- –– Connor Greentree
- –– Kenneth Hendricks
- –– George Muir
- –– Malachi Buschl

Source: Hockey New Zealand
