= 2017 Men's Ford National Hockey League =

Tournament details
- Host country: New Zealand
- City: Wellington
- Dates: 16–24 September
- Teams: 8
- Venue(s): National Hockey Stadium

Final positions
- Champions: –– North Harbour (5th title)
- Runner-up: –– Auckland
- Third place: –– Capital

Tournament statistics
- Matches played: 24
- Goals scored: 134 (5.58 per match)
- Top scorer(s): –– Samuel Lane (13 goals)
- Best player: –– Arun Panchia

The 2017 Men's Ford National Hockey League was the 19th edition of the men's field hockey tournament. The competition was held in Wellington, New Zealand, from 16 to 24 September.

North Harbour won the title for the fifth time, defeating Auckland 5–3 in the final. Capital finished in third place after winning the bronze medal match 6–1 against Southern.

== Participating teams ==
The following eight teams competed for the title:

- –– Auckland
- –– Canterbury
- –– Capital
- –– Central
- –– Midlands
- –– Northland
- –– North Harbour
- –– Southern

== Results ==
=== Preliminary round ===
==== Pool A ====
Pos	Team	Pld	W	WD	LD	L	PF	PA	PD	Pts
1	–– North Harbour	3	3	0	0	0	13	3	+10	12
2	–– Capital	3	2	0	0	1	10	7	+3	8
3	–– Southern	3	1	0	0	2	3	7	−4	4
4	–– Midlands	3	0	0	0	3	3	12	−9	0

Source: Hockey New Zealand

16 September 2017
14:30 (NZST)

North Harbour ––	4–3	–– Capital
Capizzi 28'; Bennett 48', 55'; Symonds 58'	Report	S. Miskimmin 12', 38'; Buddle 45'

Umpires:
David Tomlinson (NZL)
Bevan Nichol (NZL)

16 September 2017
16:30 (NZST)

Midlands ––	1–2	–– Southern
A. Hayward 2'	Report	Gilbert 2'; Ross 35'

Umpires:
Andrew Spence (NZL)
Lee Erskine (NZL)

18 September 2017
17:00 (NZST)

North Harbour ––	4–0	–– Southern
Shimmins 39'; Harris 49', 51'; Bennett 57'	Report

Umpires:
Lee Erskine (NZL)
Nicholas Saunders (NZL)

18 September 2017
19:00 (NZST)

Capital ––	5–2	–– Midlands
Jongejan 13'; Van Woerkom 42', 50'; D. Lett 48'; Buddle 56'	Report	A. Hayward 11'; Sarikaya 24'

Umpires:
Simon Taylor (NZL)
David Tomlinson (NZL)

20 September 2017
17:00 (NZST)

Midlands ––	0–5	–– North Harbour
	Report	Harris 3'; Capizzi 4'; Bennett 24'; Jeram 29'; Wild 50'

Umpires:
Nicholas Saunders (NZL)
Andrew Spence (NZL)

20 September 2017
19:00 (NZST)

Southern ––	1–2	–– Capital
K. O'Connor 37'	Report	Wookey 50'; Jongejan 52'

Umpires:
Benjamin Wilson (NZL)
Bruce Brownsey (NZL)

==== Pool B ====
Pos	Team	Pld	W	WD	LD	L	PF	PA	PD	Pts
1	–– Auckland	3	3	0	0	0	9	1	+8	12
2	–– Central	3	2	0	0	1	9	4	+5	8
3	–– Canterbury	3	1	0	0	2	10	5	+5	4
4	–– Northland	3	0	0	0	3	3	21	−18	0

Source: Hockey New Zealand

16 September 2017
10:30 (NZST)

Canterbury ––	10–1	–– Northland
Lane 4', 37', 39', 57'; Hayde 14'; Newman 28', 32', 52'; D. Keaney 41'; Brydon 49'	Report	Fouhy 50'

Umpires:
Bruce Brownsey (NZL)
Benjamin Wilson (NZL)

16 September 2017
12:30 (NZST)

Central ––	0–3	–– Auckland
	Report	A. Panchia 20'; J. Panchia 37'; Ritchie 51'

Umpires:
Simon Taylor (NZL)
Nicholas Saunders (NZL)

18 September 2017
13:00 (NZST)

Central ––	7–1	–– Northland
Atkinson 15', 23'; Thomas 28', 54'; Young 34'; Cohen 43'; Phillips 53'	Report	Down 47'

Umpires:
Hamish Ellis-Jack (NZL)
Andrew Spence (NZL)

18 September 2017
15:00 (NZST)

Auckland ––	2–0	–– Canterbury
Radonovich 37'; Kinder 59'	Report

Umpires:
Benjamin Wilson (NZL)
Bevan Nichol (NZL)

20 September 2017
13:00 (NZST)

Northland ––	1–4	–– Auckland
Down 18'	Report	Crooks 5', 37'; McGeorge 22', 50'

Umpires:
Bevan Nichol (NZL)
Lee Erskine (NZL)

20 September 2017
15:00 (NZST)

Canterbury ––	0–2	–– Central
	Report	Phillips 16'; Atkinson 56'

Umpires:
Hamish Ellis-Jack (NZL)
Simon Taylor (NZL)

=== Classification round ===
Quarter-finals
21 September 2017
–– North Harbour	7
–– Northland	0
21 September 2017
–– Central	2
–– Southern	3
21 September 2017
–– Auckland (pen)	2 (4)
–– Midlands	2 (3)
21 September 2017
–– Capital	2
–– Canterbury	1

Semi-finals
23 September 2017
–– North Harbour	2
–– Southern	1
23 September 2017
–– Auckland	2
–– Capital	1

Final
24 September 2017
–– North Harbour	5
–– Auckland	3
Third Place
24 September 2017
–– Southern	1
–– Capital	6

==== Quarter-finals ====
21 September 2017
17:00 (NZST)

Auckland ––	2–2	–– Midlands
J. Panchia 8'; Ritchie 37'	Report	Rees-Gibbs 15'; Keaney 16'
Penalties
Child (penalty shoot-out missed); Kinder (penalty shoot-out scored); McGeorge (penalty shoot-out scored); Kingstone (penalty shoot-out missed); J. Panchia (penalty shoot-out scored) —— Child (penalty shoot-out scored)	4–3	(penalty shoot-out missed) Mitai-Wells; (penalty shoot-out missed) Rees-Gibbs; (penalty shoot-out scored) Sarikaya; (penalty shoot-out scored) Tanner; (penalty shoot-out scored) Bouwens —— (penalty shoot-out missed) Bouwens

Umpires:
David Tomlinson (NZL)
Nicholas Saunders (NZL)

21 September 2017
17:15 (NZST)

North Harbour ––	7–0	–– Northland
Capizzi 1'; Jeram 2', 27'; Shimmins 8'; Bartholomew 17'; Harris 26', 33'	Report

Umpires:
Lee Erskine (NZL)
Bruce Brownsey (NZL)

21 September 2017
19:00 (NZST)

Capital ––	2–1	–– Canterbury
Wookey 24'; Jongejan 50'	Report	Lane 20'

Umpires:
Simon Taylor (NZL)
Bevan Nichol (NZL)

21 September 2017
19:15 (NZST)

Central ––	2–3	–– Southern
Thomas 4'; Wilcox 19'	Report	Ross 12'; Davidson 42'; O'Connor 58'

Umpires:
Andrew Spence (NZL)
Benjamin Wilson (NZL)

==== Fifth to eighth place classification ====
Crossover
23 September 2017
–– Northland	0
–– Central	10
23 September 2017
–– Midlands (pen)	3 (3)
–– Canterbury	3 (1)

Fifth Place
24 September 2017
–– Central	3
–– Midlands	4
Seventh Place
24 September 2017
–– Northland	0
–– Canterbury	11

===== Crossover =====
23 September 2017
10:15 (NZST)

Midlands ––	3–3	–– Canterbury
Tanner 11'; Sarikaya 51'; Mitai-Wells 59'	Report	Lane 9', 18'; Mouldey 36'
Penalties
Sarikaya (penalty shoot-out scored); Bouwens (penalty shoot-out scored); Lyons (penalty shoot-out missed); Tanner (penalty shoot-out scored)	3–1	(penalty shoot-out scored) Deavin; (penalty shoot-out missed) Lane; (penalty shoot-out missed) Hayde; (penalty shoot-out missed) D. Keaney

Umpires:
Hamish Ellis-Jack (NZL)
Andrew Spence (NZL)

23 September 2017
10:30 (NZST)

Central ––	10–0	–– Northland
Wilson 4'; Atkinson 13', 26', 42'; Cronin 30'; Phillips 33'; Thomas 43', 48', 50'; Cohen 44'	Report

Umpires:
Bruce Brownsey (NZL)
Nicholas Saunders (NZL)

===== Seventh and eighth place =====
24 September 2017
08:45 (NZDT)

Northland ––	0–11	–– Canterbury
	Report	Lane 4', 31', 37', 58', 58', 59'; Hayde 5'; N. Findlay 18', 46', 55'; Connell 58'

Umpires:
Lee Eriskine (NZL)
Hamish Ellis-Jack (NZL)

===== Fifth and sixth place =====
24 September 2017
10:30 (NZDT)

Central ––	3–4	–– Midlands
Wilson 18'; Thomas 32'; Atkinson 34'	Report	Mitai-Wells 48'; A. Hayward 50', 60'; R. Hayward 55'

Umpires:
Andrew Spence (NZL)
Bruce Brownsey (NZL)

==== First to fourth place classification ====
===== Semi-finals =====
23 September 2017
12:30 (NZST)

Auckland ––	2–1	–– Capital
Ritchie 50'; Child 53'	Report	Buddle 3'

Umpires:
Simon Taylor (NZL)
Lee Erskine (NZL)

23 September 2017
14:30 (NZST)

North Harbour ––	2–1	–– Southern
Bennett 5'; Jeram 20'	Report	Davidson 34'

Umpires:
Bevan Nichol (NZL)
David Tomlinson (NZL)

===== Third and fourth place =====
24 September 2017
11:00 (NZDT)

Southern ––	1–6	–– Capital
Davidson 2'	Report	S. Miskimmin 10'; Van Woerkom 11', 21'; D. Lett 34', 39'; Buddle 35'

Umpires:
Nicholas Saunders (NZL)
Benjamin Wilson (NZL)

===== Final =====
24 September 2017
15:00 (NZDT)

North Harbour ––	5–3	–– Auckland
Bennett 30', 52', 58'; Capizzi 53'; Muir 60'	Report	Radonovich 15'; J. Panchia 38', 45+'

Umpires:
David Tomlinson (NZL)
Simon Taylor (NZL)

== Statistics ==
=== Final standings ===
Pos	Team	Pld	W	WD	LD	L	GF	GA	GD	Pts	Qualification
1st place, gold medalist(s)	–– North Harbour	6	6	0	0	0	27	7	+20	24	Gold Medal
2nd place, silver medalist(s)	–– Auckland	6	4	1	0	1	16	9	+7	18	Silver Medal
3rd place, bronze medalist(s)	–– Capital	6	4	0	0	2	19	11	+8	16	Bronze Medal
4	–– Southern	6	2	0	0	4	8	17	−9	8	
5	–– Midlands	6	1	1	1	3	12	20	−8	7	
6	–– Central	6	3	0	0	3	24	11	+13	12	
7	–– Canterbury	6	2	0	1	3	25	10	+15	9	
8	–– Northland	6	0	0	0	6	3	49	−46	0	

Source: Hockey New Zealand

=== Goalscorers ===
There were 134 goals scored in 24 matches, for an average of 5.58 goals per match.

13 goals

- –– Samuel Lane

8 goals

- –– Cory Bennett

7 goals

- –– Martin Atkinson
- –– Dylan Thomas

5 goals

- –– Daniel Harris

4 goals

- –– Jared Panchia
- –– Sebastian Buddle
- –– Benedict van Woerkom
- –– Andrew Hayward
- –– Robert Capizzi
- –– Kalyan Jeram

3 goals

- –– Michael Ritchie
- –– Nicholas Findlay
- –– Dominic Newman
- –– Daan Jongejan
- –– Dane Lett
- –– Samuel Miskimmin
- –– Hayden Phillips
- –– Lachlan Davidson

2 goals

- –– Joseph Crooks
- –– Hamish McGeorge
- –– Benjamin Radonovich
- –– Cameron Hayde
- –– Oscar Wookey
- –– Jordan Cohen
- –– Nicholas Wilson
- –– Leo Mitai-Wells
- –– Aidan Sarikaya
- –– Joshua Down
- –– Kirk Shimmins
- –– Kieran O'Connor
- –– Nicholas Ross

1 goal

- –– Marcus Child
- –– Jonathan Kinder
- –– Arun Panchia
- –– David Brydon
- –– George Connell
- –– Declan Keaney
- –– Thomas Mouldey
- –– Luther Cronin
- –– Mackenzie Wilcox
- –– Matthew Young
- –– Richard Hayward
- –– Jonathan Keaney
- –– Matthew Rees-Gibbs
- –– Benjamin Tanner
- –– Nathan Fouhy
- –– Joseph Bartholomew
- –– George Muir
- –– Matthew Symonds
- –– Warren Wild
- –– Nathan Gilbert

Source: Hockey New Zealand
