= 2014 Men's Ford National Hockey League =

Tournament details
- Host country: New Zealand
- Dates: 30 August – 14 September
- Teams: 8
- Venue: 9 (in 8 host cities)

Final positions
- Champions: –– Auckland (4th title)
- Runner-up: –– Midlands
- Third place: –– Canterbury

Tournament statistics
- Matches played: 36
- Goals scored: 156 (4.33 per match)
- Top scorer(s): –– Jared Panchia –– Richard Petherick (7 goals)
- Best player: –– Timothy Deavin

The 2014 Men's Ford National Hockey League was the 16th edition of the men's field hockey tournament. The competition was held in various cities across New Zealand, from 30 August to 14 September.

Auckland won the title for the fourth time, defeating Midlands 3–0 in the final. Canterbury finished in third place, defeating Southern 4–0 in the third place match.

== Participating teams ==
The following eight teams competed for the title:

- –– Auckland
- –– Canterbury
- –– Capital
- –– Central
- –– Midlands
- –– Northland
- –– North Harbour
- –– Southern

== Results ==
All times are local (NZST).

=== Preliminary round ===
Pos	Team	Pld	W	WD	LD	L	GF	GA	GD	Pts	Qualification
1	–– Auckland	7	5	1	0	1	19	7	+12	22	Advanced to Semi-Finals
2	–– Canterbury	7	5	0	0	2	23	9	+14	20	Advanced to Semi-Finals
3	–– Midlands	7	4	1	1	1	19	8	+11	19	Advanced to Semi-Finals
4	–– Southern	7	4	1	1	1	10	5	+5	19	Advanced to Semi-Finals
5	–– North Harbour	7	3	1	2	1	17	10	+7	16	
6	–– Capital	7	2	0	0	5	10	20	−10	8	
7	–– Central	7	1	0	0	6	12	27	−15	4	
8	–– Northland	7	0	0	0	7	10	34	−24	0	

Source: Hockey New Zealand
Rules for classification: 1) points; 2) matches won; 3) goal difference; 4) goals for; 5) head-to-head result; 6) field goals scored.

==== Fixtures ====
30 August 2014
13:30

Southern ––	2–1	–– Auckland
Dungey 41'; Crooks 51'	Report	Archibald 53'

Logan Park, Dunedin
Umpires:
Nicholas Saunders (NZL)
Devendra Patel (NZL)

30 August 2014
14:00

Northland ––	2–5	–– North Harbour
Watene 53'; Rintala 60+'	Report	Bennett 5'; J. Bartholomew 25', 39', 52'; Wild 59'

Kensington Sports Park, Whangārei
Umpires:
Timothy Bond (NZL)
Andrew Spence (NZL)

30 August 2014
14:30

Canterbury ––	5–1	–– Capital
C. Hayde 14', 42', 43'; Connell 43'; Davidson 58'	Report	Hilton 39'

Porritt Park, Christchurch
Umpires:
Gareth Greenfield (NZL)
Mark Rippin (NZL)

30 August 2014
15:00

Central ––	0–5	–– Midlands
	Report	Petherick 4'; Keaney 8'; Herewini 26'; Rees-Gibbs 35'; Z. Woods 59'

TET MultiSports Centre, Stratford
Umpires:
Benjamin Wilson (NZL)
Bevan Nichol (NZL)

31 August 2014
14:00

Auckland ––	8–1	–– Northland
S. Miskimmin 8', 40'; J. Panchia 14', 29', 47'; Keshoor 15'; Louden 28'; Rowsell 56'	Report	Laidlaw 55'

Lloyd Elsmore Hockey Stadium, Auckland
Umpires:
Andrew Spence (NZL)
Timothy Bond (NZL)

31 August 2014
14:00

Southern ––	0–1	–– Canterbury
	Report	Haig 53'

Aorangi Park, Timaru
Umpires:
Benjamin Grant (NZL)
Mark Rippin (NZL)

31 August 2014
15:00

Midlands ––	1–1	–– North Harbour
Deavin 58'	Report	Joy 30'
Penalties
Rees-Gibbs (penalty shoot-out missed); Mitai-Ngatai (penalty shoot-out scored); Deavin (penalty shoot-out scored); N. Woods (penalty shoot-out missed); Whitehead (penalty shoot-out missed)	2–3	(penalty shoot-out missed) Coughlan; (penalty shoot-out scored) Alexander-Parker; (penalty shoot-out scored) Muir; (penalty shoot-out missed) Evans; (penalty shoot-out scored) Green

Gallagher Hockey Centre, Hamilton
Umpires:
Bevan Nichol (NZL)
David Tomlinson (NZL)

31 August 2014
15:00

Capital ––	5–1	–– Central
Jones 11'; Van Woerkom 15'; Hilton 23'; J. Smith 38'; H. Miskimmin 52'	Report	Atkinson 19'

Mazengarb Reserve, Paraparaumu
Umpires:
Lee Erskine (NZL)
Simon Taylor (NZL)

6 September 2014
11:00

Midlands ––	3–2	–– Canterbury
Petherick 3'; Z. Woods 36'; Mitai-Wells 38'	Report	Orchard 41'; Budgeon 58'

North Harbour Hockey Stadium, Auckland
Umpires:
Simon Taylor (NZL)
David Tomlinson (NZL)

6 September 2014
13:00

Capital ––	3–1	–– Northland
J. Smith 1'; D. Lett 8'; Jones 33'	Report	Rintala 5'

North Harbour Hockey Stadium, Auckland
Umpires:
Lee Erskine (NZL)
Benjamin Grant (NZL)

6 September 2014
15:00

North Harbour ––	1–1	–– Auckland
Coughlan 60'	Report	Rowsell 49'
Penalties
Edwards (penalty shoot-out scored); Green (penalty shoot-out scored); Coughlan (penalty shoot-out scored); Alexander-Parker (penalty shoot-out scored); Muir (penalty shoot-out missed) —— Edwards (penalty shoot-out missed)	4–5	(penalty shoot-out scored) Dwyer; (penalty shoot-out scored) Archibald; (penalty shoot-out missed) J. Panchia; (penalty shoot-out scored) Child; (penalty shoot-out scored) A. Panchia —— (penalty shoot-out scored) Dwyer

North Harbour Hockey Stadium, Auckland
Umpires:
Nicholas Saunders (NZL)
Gareth Greenfield (NZL)

6 September 2014
17:00

Central ––	0–1	–– Southern
	Report	Crooks 38'

North Harbour Hockey Stadium, Auckland
Umpires:
Devendra Patel (NZL)
Benjamin Wilson (NZL)

7 September 2014
10:30

Northland ––	2–5	–– Midlands
Rintala 5'; Laidlaw 51'	Report	Petherick 3', 9'; Keaney 10'; Z. Woods 13'; Mitai-Wells 33'

North Harbour Hockey Stadium, Auckland
Umpires:
Devendra Patel (NZL)
Mark Rippin (NZL)

7 September 2014
12:30

Auckland ––	2–1	–– Canterbury
Loudon 44'; Bilkey 51'	Report	Watts 21'

North Harbour Hockey Stadium, Auckland
Umpires:
Simon Taylor (NZL)
Bevan Nichol (NZL)

7 September 2014
14:30

North Harbour ––	4–1	–– Central
J. Bartholomew 4'; Joy 17'; Evans 24'; Alexander-Parker 37'	Report	Davison 9'

North Harbour Hockey Stadium, Auckland
Umpires:
Mark Rippin (NZL)
Timothy Bond (NZL)

7 September 2014
16:30

Capital ––	1–3	–– Southern
Kepes 53'	Report	Ross 19'; Kingstone 32'; Dungey 54'

North Harbour Hockey Stadium, Auckland
Umpires:
Gareth Greenfield (NZL)
Andrew Spence (NZL)

8 September 2014
12:00

Canterbury ––	3–1	–– Northland
Bain 4'; Garrett 5'; Budgeon 22'	Report	Thorne 60'

North Harbour Hockey Stadium, Auckland
Umpires:
Timothy Bond (NZL)
Devendra Patel (NZL)

8 September 2014
14:00

Central ––	2–3	–– Auckland
Davison 15+'; Cosgrove 45'	Report	Child 39'; Dwyer 58'; Archibald 58'

North Harbour Hockey Stadium, Auckland
Umpires:
Benjamin Wilson (NZL)
Benjamin Grant (NZL)

8 September 2014
16:00

Southern ––	0–0	–– North Harbour
	Report
Penalties
Ross (penalty shoot-out missed); Russell (penalty shoot-out missed); Bailey (penalty shoot-out scored); Elder (penalty shoot-out missed); Kingstone (penalty shoot-out scored) —— Bailey (penalty shoot-out missed); Ross (penalty shoot-out scored)	3–2	(penalty shoot-out scored) Edwards; (penalty shoot-out scored) Muir; (penalty shoot-out missed) Green; (penalty shoot-out missed) Coughlan; (penalty shoot-out missed) Alexander-Parker —— (penalty shoot-out missed) Edwards; (penalty shoot-out missed) Alexander-Parker

North Harbour Hockey Stadium, Auckland
Umpires:
Mark Rippin (NZL)
Gareth Greenfield (NZL)

8 September 2014
18:00

Midlands ––	3–0	–– Capital
Herewini 4'; Petherick 28', 44'	Report

North Harbour Hockey Stadium, Auckland
Umpires:
Lee Erskine (NZL)
David Tomlinson (NZL)

10 September 2014
11:30

Auckland ––	3–0	–– Capital
Ritchie 18'; Archibald 27'; Radonovich 47'	Report

North Harbour Hockey Stadium, Auckland
Umpires:
Benjamin Grant (NZL)
Bevan Nichol (NZL)

10 September 2014
13:30

Midlands ––	2–2	–– Southern
Petherick 4'; Z. Woods 14'	Report	Paton 41'; Morris 59'
Penalties
Rees-Gibbs (penalty shoot-out missed); Deavin (penalty shoot-out scored); N. Woods (penalty shoot-out missed); Mitai-Ngatai (penalty shoot-out missed); Tanner (penalty shoot-out missed) —— Deavin (penalty shoot-out scored)	2–1	(penalty shoot-out missed) Ross; (penalty shoot-out missed) Ashton; (penalty shoot-out scored) Bailey; (penalty shoot-out missed) Russell; (penalty shoot-out missed) Kingstone —— (penalty shoot-out missed) Ross

North Harbour Hockey Stadium, Auckland
Umpires:
Simon Taylor (NZL)
Timothy Bond (NZL)

10 September 2014
15:30

Northland ––	3–8	–– Central
Yeo 2', 37'; Lamb 32'	Report	Davison 3'; Molloy 8', 26'; Young 24', 41'; Brougham 39'; Finlayson 58'; Joyce 60+'

North Harbour Hockey Stadium, Auckland
Umpires:
Nicholas Saunders (NZL)
Andrew Spence (NZL)

10 September 2014
17:30

Canterbury ––	5–2	–– North Harbour
Bain 18'; Watts 21'; C. Hayde 34'; Garrett 38'; M. Hayde 42'	Report	Alexander-Parker 11'; Green 23'

North Harbour Hockey Stadium, Auckland
Umpires:
David Tomlinson (NZL)
Benjamin Wilson (NZL)

11 September 2014
12:00

Auckland ––	1–0	–– Midlands
J. Panchia 42'	Report

North Harbour Hockey Stadium, Auckland
Umpires:
David Tomlinson (NZL)
Lee Erskine (NZL)

11 September 2014
14:00

Southern ––	2–0	–– Northland
Ashton 1'; Bailey 2'	Report

North Harbour Hockey Stadium, Auckland
Umpires:
Benjamin Grant (NZL)
Bevan Nichol (NZL)

11 September 2014
16:00

North Harbour ––	4–0	–– Capital
Coughlan 10'; Alexander-Parker 12'; Bennett 22'; E. Bartholomew 56'	Report

North Harbour Hockey Stadium, Auckland
Umpires:
Timothy Bond (NZL)
Mark Rippin (NZL)

11 September 2014
18:00

Canterbury ––	6–0	–– Central
Davidson 5'; C. Hayde 17', 42'; W. Hayde 26', 56'; Budgeon 50'	Report

North Harbour Hockey Stadium, Auckland
Umpires:
Devendra Patel (NZL)
Simon Taylor (NZL)

=== Classification round ===
==== Fifth to eighth place classification ====
Crossover
13 September 2014
–– North Harbour	4
–– Northland	2
13 September 2014
–– Capital	4
–– Central	2

Fifth Place
14 September 2014
–– North Harbour	1
–– Capital	0
Seventh Place
14 September 2014
–– Northland	1
–– Central	6

===== Crossover =====
13 September 2014
14:30

Capital ––	4–2	–– Central
J. Smith 7', 57'; H. Miskimmin 22'; Kepes 29'	Report	Young 6'; Davison 55'

North Harbour Hockey Stadium, Auckland
Umpires:
Andrew Spence (NZL)
Benjamin Grant (NZL)

13 September 2014
16:30

North Harbour ––	4–2	–– Northland
Joy 5'; Edwards 9'; J. Bartholomew 35'; Coughlan 41'	Report	I. Staples 16'; Argent 31'

North Harbour Hockey Stadium, Auckland
Umpires:
Nicholas Saunders (NZL)
Benjamin Wilson (NZL)

===== Seventh and eighth place =====
14 September 2014
08:15

Northland ––	1–6	–– Central
Lamb 23'	Report	Hanks 8'; Davison 24', 51'; Joyce 39'; Cosgrove 41'; Smith 50'

North Harbour Hockey Stadium, Auckland
Umpires:
Mark Rippin (NZL)
Benjamin Grant (NZL)

===== Fifth and sixth place =====
14 September 2014
08:30

North Harbour ––	1–0	–– Capital
Green 16'	Report

North Harbour Hockey Stadium, Auckland
Umpires:
Gareth Greenfield (NZL)
Andrew Spence (NZL)

==== First to fourth place classification ====
Semi-Finals
13 September 2014
–– Auckland	3
–– Southern	2
13 September 2014
–– Canterbury	2 (4)
–– Midlands (pen.)	2 (5)

Final
14 September 2014
–– Auckland	3
–– Midlands	0
Third Place
14 September 2014
–– Southern	0
–– Canterbury	4

===== Semi-finals =====
13 September 2014
14:00

Auckland ––	3–2	–– Southern
Rowsell 16'; J. Panchia 31', 47'	Report	Crooks 28', 45'

North Harbour Hockey Stadium, Auckland
Umpires:
Devendra Patel (NZL)
Mark Rippin (NZL)

13 September 2014
16:00

Canterbury ––	2–2	–– Midlands
Budgeon 6', 29'	Report	Keaney 14'; Herewini 55'
Penalties
Orchard (penalty shoot-out scored); Haig (penalty shoot-out scored); Budgeon (penalty shoot-out missed); C. Hayde (penalty shoot-out missed); M. Hayde (penalty shoot-out missed) —— Orchard (penalty shoot-out scored); Haig (penalty shoot-out scored); M. Hayde (penalty shoot-out missed)	4–5	(penalty shoot-out missed) Mitai-Ngatai; (penalty shoot-out scored) Deavin; (penalty shoot-out scored) Mitai-Wells; (penalty shoot-out missed) N. Woods; (penalty shoot-out missed) Rees-Gibbs —— (penalty shoot-out scored) Deavin; (penalty shoot-out scored) Tanner; (penalty shoot-out scored) N. Woods

North Harbour Hockey Stadium, Auckland
Umpires:
Gareth Greenfield (NZL)
Bevan Nichol (NZL)

===== Third and fourth place =====
14 September 2014
10:30

Southern ––	0–4	–– Canterbury
	Report	Bain 1'; W. Hayde 39'; Davidson 59'; Orchard 60+'

North Harbour Hockey Stadium, Auckland
Umpires:
Timothy Bond (NZL)
Lee Erskine (NZL)

===== Final =====
14 September 2014
14:20

Auckland ––	3–0	–– Midlands
Child 3'; Morar 7'; J. Panchia 34'	Report

North Harbour Hockey Stadium, Auckland
Umpires:
Simon Taylor (NZL)
David Tomlinson (NZL)

== Statistics ==
=== Final standings ===
Pos	Team	Pld	W	WD	LD	L	GF	GA	GD	Pts	Qualification
1st place, gold medalist(s)	–– Auckland	9	7	1	0	1	25	9	+16	30	Gold Medal
2nd place, silver medalist(s)	–– Midlands	9	4	2	1	2	21	13	+8	21	Silver Medal
3rd place, bronze medalist(s)	–– Canterbury	9	6	0	1	2	29	11	+18	25	Bronze Medal
4	–– Southern	9	4	1	1	3	12	12	0	19	
5	–– North Harbour	9	5	1	2	1	22	12	+10	24	
6	–– Capital	9	3	0	0	6	14	23	−9	12	
7	–– Central	9	2	0	0	7	20	32	−12	8	
8	–– Northland	9	0	0	0	9	13	44	−31	0	

Source: Hockey New Zealand

=== Goalscorers ===
There were 156 goals scored in 36 matches, for an average of 4.33 goals per match.

7 goals

- –– Jared Panchia
- –– Richard Petherick

6 goals

- –– Cameron Hayde
- –– Steven Davison

5 goals

- –– Nicholas Budgeon
- –– Joseph Bartholomew

4 goals

- –– Jacob Smith
- –– Zachery Woods
- –– Joseph Crooks

3 goals

- –– Ryan Archibald
- –– Dwayne Rowsell
- –– Richard Bain
- –– William Davidson
- –– William Hayde
- –– Matthew Young
- –– Connor Herewini
- –– Jonathan Keaney
- –– Aidan Rintala
- –– Brennan Alexander-Parker
- –– James Coughlan
- –– Nathaniel Joy

2 goals

- –– Marcus Child
- –– Thomas Louden
- –– Samuel Miskimmin
- –– Trevor Garrett
- –– Simon Orchard
- –– Fergus Watts
- –– Blair Hilton
- –– Jared Jones
- –– Gabriel Kepes
- –– Harrison Miskimmin
- –– Ryan Cosgrove
- –– Cameron Joyce
- –– Benjamin Molloy
- –– Leo Mitai-Wells
- –– Sean Laidlaw
- –– Harrison Lamb
- –– Rowan Yeo
- –– Cory Bennett
- –– David Green
- –– Jason Dungey

1 goal

- –– Jonathon Bilkey
- –– Jamie Dwyer
- –– Jignesh Keshoor
- –– Veeran Morar
- –– Benjamin Radonovich
- –– Michael Ritchie
- –– George Connell
- –– Nicholas Haig
- –– Mitchell Hayde
- –– Dane Lett
- –– Benedict van Woerkom
- –– Martin Atkinson
- –– Matthew Brougham
- –– Nicholas Finlayson
- –– Joseph Hanks
- –– Robin Smith
- –– Timothy Deavin
- –– Matthew Rees-Gibbs
- –– Matthew Argent
- –– Isaac Staples
- –– Mark Thorne
- –– James Watene
- –– Elliot Bartholomew
- –– Steven Edwards
- –– Stephen Evans
- –– Warren Wild
- –– Christopher Ashton
- –– Callum Bailey
- –– Kim Kingstone
- –– Jeremy Morris
- –– Campbell Paton
- –– Nicholas Ross

Source: Hockey New Zealand
