= 2019 Men's Ford National Hockey League =

Tournament details
- Host country: New Zealand
- City: Tauranga
- Dates: 14–22 September
- Teams: 8
- Venue(s): Blake Park

Final positions
- Champions: –– North Harbour (6th title)
- Runner-up: –– Auckland
- Third place: –– Canterbury

Tournament statistics
- Matches played: 28
- Goals scored: 141 (5.04 per match)
- Top scorer(s): –– Samuel Lane –– Joel Rintala (7 goals)
- Best player: –– James Coughlan

The 2019 Men's Ford National Hockey League was the 21st and final edition of the men's field hockey tournament. The competition was held in Tauranga, New Zealand, from 14 to 22 September.

North Harbour won the title for the sixth time, defeating Auckland 2–1 in the final. Canterbury finished in third place after defeating Capital in the third place match, 2–1.

== Participating teams ==
For the first time in history, the NHL hosted an international team from Australia, comprising players from the country's most southern state, Tasmania. The following eight teams competed for the title:

- –– Auckland
- –– Canterbury
- –– Capital
- –– Central
- –– Midlands
- –– North Harbour
- –– Southern
- Tasmania

== Results ==
=== Preliminary round ===
==== Pool A ====
Pos	Team	Pld	W	WD	LD	L	GF	GA	GD	Pts	Qualification
1	–– Capital	3	3	0	0	0	13	5	+8	12	Advanced to Pool C
2	–– Auckland	3	2	0	0	1	9	6	+3	8	Advanced to Pool C
3	Tasmania	3	1	0	0	2	4	8	−4	4	
4	–– Central	3	0	0	0	3	5	12	−7	0	

Source: Hockey New Zealand
Rules for classification: 1) points; 2) matches won; 3) goal difference; 4) goals for; 5) head-to-head result; 6) field goals scored.

14 September 2019
12:15

Capital ––	5–1	Tasmania
Patel 11'; Rintala 13'; Yeo 22'; Van Woerkom 25'; Harris 53'	Report	McHugh 15'

Umpires:
Simon Taylor (NZL)
Gareth Greenfield (NZL)

14 September 2019
14:15

Auckland ––	5–2	–– Central
Fraser 17'; Keaney 31'; Rowsell 33'; Finlayson 55'; McGeorge 56'	Report	Scanlon 2'; Peel 39'

Umpires:
David Tomlinson (NZL)
Benjamin Grant (NZL)

15 September 2019
12:00

Central ––	2–5	–– Capital
Thomas 12'; Hiha 36'	Report	Patel 8'; Rintala 10', 48', 59'; Lovett 45'

Umpires:
Benjamin Grant (NZL)
Simon Taylor (NZL)

15 September 2019
14:00

Auckland ––	2–1	Tasmania
Mitai-Wells 49'; Rowsell 53'	Report	Brooks 19'

Umpires:
Bevan Nichol (NZL)
Bruce Brownsey (NZL)

17 September 2019
13:30

Capital ––	3–2	–– Auckland
Logan 8'; Yeo 26'; Miskimmin 56'	Report	Finlayson 18'; Mitai-Wells 38'

Umpires:
Bevan Nichol (NZL)
Bren Duckworth (NZL)

17 September 2019
15:30

Central ––	1–2	Tasmania
Findlay 38'	Report	Thomas 12', 46'

Umpires:
Nicholas Saunders (NZL)
Benjamin Grant (NZL)

==== Pool B ====
Pos	Team	Pld	W	WD	LD	L	GF	GA	GD	Pts	Qualification
1	–– Canterbury	3	3	0	0	0	13	6	+7	12	Advanced to Pool C
2	–– North Harbour	3	2	0	0	1	8	6	+2	8	Advanced to Pool C
3	–– Southern	3	1	0	0	2	5	10	−5	4	
4	–– Midlands	3	0	0	0	3	6	10	−4	0	

Source: Hockey New Zealand
Rules for classification: 1) points; 2) matches won; 3) goal difference; 4) goals for; 5) head-to-head result; 6) field goals scored.

14 September 2019
16:15

Canterbury ––	3–2	–– Midlands
Lane 5', 42'; Newman 22'	Report	Wyndham-Smith 32'; Rees-Gibbs 41'

Umpires:
Bruce Brownsey (NZL)
Lee Erskine (NZL)

14 September 2019
18:15

North Harbour ––	2–0	–– Southern
Capizzi 12'; Guy 27'	Report

Umpires:
Nicholas Saunders (NZL)
Bevan Nichol (NZL)

15 September 2019
16:00

Midlands ––	3–4	–– North Harbour
Hayward 15'; De Jong 19'; Andrews 60'	Report	B. Edwards 3'; Capizzi 20'; Ottow 40'; Guy 43'

Umpires:
Lee Erskine (NZL)
Gareth Greenfield (NZL)

15 September 2019
18:00

Canterbury ––	7–2	–– Southern
Connell 13'; Jackson 14'; Anderson 34'; Newman 35'; Summers 38'; Wakeling 40'; Lane 60'	Report	J. O'Connor 10'; Dempster 39'

Umpires:
David Tomlinson (NZL)
Bren Duckworth (NZL)

17 September 2019
17:30

North Harbour ––	2–3	–– Canterbury
Capizzi 37'; Jeram 42'	Report	Newman 1'; Lane 13'; Summers 24'

Umpires:
Gareth Greenfield (NZL)
Bruce Brownsey (NZL)

17 September 2019
19:30

Midlands ––	1–3	–– Southern
Rees-Gibbs 57'	Report	Thomas 19', 42', 50'

Umpires:
Simon Taylor (NZL)
Benjamin Grant (NZL)

=== Classification round ===
==== Pool C ====
Pos	Team	Pld	W	WD	LD	L	GF	GA	GD	Pts	Qualification
1	–– Auckland	3	3	0	0	0	10	4	+6	12	Advanced to Final
2	–– North Harbour	3	2	0	0	1	6	6	0	8	Advanced to Final
3	–– Canterbury	3	1	0	0	2	6	8	−2	4	
4	–– Capital	3	0	0	0	3	7	11	−4	0	

Source: Hockey New Zealand
Rules for classification: 1) points; 2) matches won; 3) goal difference; 4) goals for; 5) head-to-head result; 6) field goals scored.

18 September 2019
19:30

Canterbury ––	2–4	–– Auckland
Jackson 22'; Bartholomew 59'	Report	Keaney 12'; Rowsell 21'; Hanks 32'; S. Child 54'

Umpires:
Bevan Nichol (NZL)
Simon Taylor (NZL)

18 September 2019
19:45

Capital ––	3–4	–– North Harbour
Harris 42'; Lovett 47'; Rintala 51'	Report	Lum 4'; B. Edwards 41', 48'; Herewini 58'

Umpires:
David Tomlinson (NZL)
Gareth Greenfield (NZL)

19 September 2019
19:30

Auckland ––	2–0	–– North Harbour
S. Child 5'; M. Child 25'	Report

Umpires:
Gareth Greenfield (NZL)
Benjamin Grant (NZL)

19 September 2019
19:45

Capital ––	2–3	–– Canterbury
Rintala 34'; Yeo 55'	Report	Newman 5'; Lane 36', 44'

Umpires:
Bruce Brownsey (NZL)
David Tomlinson (NZL)

21 September 2019
10:00

Canterbury ––	1–2	–– North Harbour
Brydon 17'	Report	M. Hayde 37'; Muir 45'

Umpires:
Simon Taylor (NZL)
David Tomlinson (NZL)

21 September 2019
14:00

Capital ––	2–4	–– Auckland
Lovett 22', 53'	Report	McGeorge 7', 46'; Kingstone 10'; Iswar 16'

Umpires:
Nicholas Saunders (NZL)
Bevan Nichol (NZL)

==== Pool D ====
Pos	Team	Pld	W	WD	LD	L	GF	GA	GD	Pts
1	–– Central	3	2	1	0	0	10	7	+3	10
2	–– Southern	3	1	0	1	1	6	7	−1	5
3	–– Midlands	3	1	0	0	2	7	8	−1	4
4	Tasmania	3	0	1	1	1	6	7	−1	3

Source: Hockey New Zealand
Rules for classification: 1) points; 2) matches won; 3) goal difference; 4) goals for; 5) head-to-head result; 6) field goals scored.

18 September 2019
17:30

Tasmania	2–3	–– Midlands
Beltz 4'; Thomas 50'	Report	Scanlon 8'; Andrews 37'; Whitehead 55'

Umpires:
Lee Erskine (NZL)
Nicholas Saunders (NZL)

18 September 2019
17:45

Southern ––	2–4	–– Central
Thomas 29'; K. O'Connor 30'	Report	Thomas 20', 49', 49'; Yamasaki 59'

Umpires:
Bren Duckworth (NZL)
Bruce Brownsey (NZL)

19 September 2019
17:30

Central ––	4–3	–– Midlands
Thomas 30'; Collier 41'; Findlay 44'; Yamasaki 53'	Report	Rees-Gibbs 11'; Wyndham-Smith 26'; Scanlon 30'

Umpires:
Bren Duckworth (NZL)
Simon Taylor (NZL)

19 September 2019
17:45

Tasmania	2–2	–– Southern
Beltz 10'; Smith 53'	Report	Thorn 23'; Thomas 25'
Penalties
Thomas (penalty shoot-out missed); Brooks (penalty shoot-out scored); Beltz (penalty shoot-out scored); Smith (penalty shoot-out scored); Wilcox (penalty shoot-out missed) —— Smith (penalty shoot-out scored); Brooks (penalty shoot-out scored); Beltz (penalty shoot-out scored)	6–5	(penalty shoot-out missed) J. Ward; (penalty shoot-out scored) K. O'Connor; (penalty shoot-out scored) Thomas; (penalty shoot-out scored) Milicich; (penalty shoot-out missed) J. O'Connor —— (penalty shoot-out scored) K. O'Connor; (penalty shoot-out scored) Milicich; (penalty shoot-out missed) Thomas

Umpires:
Bevan Nichol (NZL)
Lee Erskine (NZL)

21 September 2019
08:15

Southern ––	2–1	–– Midlands
Ross 6'; K. O'Connor 53'	Report	De Jong 36'

Umpires:
Gareth Greenfield (NZL)
Lee Erskine (NZL)

21 September 2019
10:15

Tasmania	2–2	–– Central
Watson 18'; Beltz 50'	Report	Hiha 4'; Thomas 26'
Penalties
Smith (penalty shoot-out missed); Walker-Kidd (penalty shoot-out missed); Beltz (penalty shoot-out scored); Bourke (penalty shoot-out missed); Wilcox (penalty shoot-out missed)	1–2	(penalty shoot-out missed) Yamasaki; (penalty shoot-out scored) Scanlon; (penalty shoot-out scored) Thomas; (penalty shoot-out missed) McAleese

Umpires:
Benjamin Grant (NZL)
Bren Duckworth (NZL)

=== Classification matches ===
==== Seventh and eighth place ====
22 September 2019
08:15

Midlands ––	2–3	Tasmania
Wyndham-Smith 3', 32'	Report	Watson 15'; Read 33'; Hogan-Jones 56'

Umpires:
Nicholas Saunders (NZL)
Lee Erskine (NZL)

==== Fifth and sixth place ====
22 September 2019
12:15

Central ––	3–3	–– Southern
Scanlon 2'; Hiha 5'; Yamasaki 50'	Report	J. Ward 20'; Gilbert 49'; K. O'Connor 54'
Penalties
Yamasaki (penalty shoot-out scored); Scanlon (penalty shoot-out missed); Thomas (penalty shoot-out missed); McAleese (penalty shoot-out scored); Wilcox (penalty shoot-out missed)	2–3	(penalty shoot-out scored) J. Ward; (penalty shoot-out scored) Ross; (penalty shoot-out missed) Thomas; (penalty shoot-out scored) K. O'Connor

Umpires:
Bruce Brownsey (NZL)
Bevan Nichol (NZL)

==== Third and fourth place ====
22 September 2019
12:00

Canterbury ––	4–2	–– Capital
Heale 14'; Jackson 21'; Lane 43'; Shaw 53'	Report	Rintala 54'; Smith 58'

Umpires:
David Tomlinson (NZL)
Benjamin Grant (NZL)

==== Final ====
22 September 2019
16:15

Auckland ––	1–2	–– North Harbour
Iswar 42'	Report	Capizzi 17'; Coughlan 29'

Umpires:
Gareth Greenfield (NZL)
Simon Taylor (NZL)

== Statistics ==
=== Final standings ===
Pos	Team	Pld	W	WD	LD	L	GF	GA	GD	Pts	Qualification
1st place, gold medalist(s)	–– North Harbour	7	5	0	0	2	16	13	+3	20	Gold Medal
2nd place, silver medalist(s)	–– Auckland	7	5	0	0	2	20	12	+8	20	Silver Medal
3rd place, bronze medalist(s)	–– Canterbury	7	5	0	0	2	23	16	+7	20	Bronze Medal
4	–– Capital	7	3	0	0	4	22	20	+2	12	
5	–– Southern	7	2	1	1	3	14	20	−6	11	
6	–– Central	7	2	1	1	3	18	22	−4	11	
7	Tasmania	7	2	1	1	3	13	17	−4	11	
8	–– Midlands	7	1	0	0	6	15	21	−6	4	

Source: Hockey New Zealand

=== Goalscorers ===
There were 141 goals scored in 28 matches, for an average of 5.04 goals per match.

7 goals

- –– Samuel Lane
- –– Joel Rintala

6 goals

- –– Dylan Thomas

5 goals

- –– Dylan Thomas

4 goals

- –– Dominic Newman
- –– Kurt Lovett
- –– Maks Wyndham-Smith
- –– Robert Capizzi

3 goals

- –– Hamish McGeorge
- –– Dwayne Rowsell
- –– Moss Jackson
- –– Rowan Yeo
- –– Samuel Hiha
- –– Koji Yamasaki
- –– Matthew Rees-Gibbs
- –– Benji Edwards
- –– Kieran O'Connor
- (Tasmania) Hayden Beltz
- (Tasmania) James Thomas

2 goals

- –– Simon Child
- –– Nicholas Finlayson
- –– Shae Iswar
- –– Jonathan Keaney
- –– Leo Mitai-Wells
- –– Trent Summers
- –– Daniel Harris
- –– Sajan Patel
- –– Sean Findlay
- –– Andrew Scanlon
- –– Reuben Andrews
- –– Frithjof de Jong
- –– Daniel Scanlon
- –– Xavier Guy
- (Tasmania) Brenton Watson

1 goal

- –– Marcus Child
- –– Zander Fraser
- –– Joseph Hanks
- –– Kim Kingstone
- –– Peter Anderson
- –– Joseph Bartholomew
- –– David Brydon
- –– George Connell
- –– Llewelyn Heale
- –– Bradley Shaw
- –– Gus Wakeling
- –– Oliver Logan
- –– Harrison Miskimmin
- –– Jacob Smith
- –– Benedict van Woerkom
- –– Benjamin Collier
- –– Jason Peel
- –– Richard Hayward
- –– Chad Whitehead
- –– James Coughlan
- –– Mitchell Hayde
- –– Connor Herewini
- –– Kalyan Jeram
- –– Richmond Lum
- –– George Muir
- –– Mitchell Ottow
- –– Callum Dempster
- –– Nathan Gilbert
- –– Joseph O'Connor
- –– Nicholas Ross
- –– Jonathan Thorn
- –– Jordan Ward
- (Tasmania) Joshua Brooks
- (Tasmania) Alexander Hogan-Jones
- (Tasmania) Ian McHugh
- (Tasmania) Benjamin Read
- (Tasmania) Oliver Smith

Source: Hockey New Zealand
