= 2018 Women's Ford National Hockey League =

Tournament details
- Host country: New Zealand
- City: Wellington
- Dates: 9–23 September
- Teams: 8
- Venue: National Hockey Stadium

Final positions
- Champions: –– North Harbour (4th title)
- Runner-up: –– Central
- Third place: –– Midlands

Tournament statistics
- Matches played: 32
- Goals scored: 115 (3.59 per match)
- Top scorer(s): –– Kaitlin Cotter –– Kirsten Pearce (7 goals)

The 2018 Women's Ford National Hockey League was the 20th edition of the women's field hockey tournament. The competition was held in Wellington, New Zealand between 9–23 September.

North Harbour won the title for the 4th time, defeating Central 2–0 in the final. Midlands finished in third place after winning the third place match 1–0 over Auckland.

== Participating teams ==
The following eight teams competed for the title:

- –– Auckland
- –– Canterbury
- –– Capital
- –– Central
- –– Midlands
- –– Northland
- –– North Harbour
- –– Southern

== Results ==
=== Preliminary round ===
Pos	Team	Pld	W	WD	LD	L	GF	GA	GD	Pts	Qualification
1	–– North Harbour	7	4	1	1	1	17	4	+13	19	Advanced to Final
2	–– Central	7	3	2	0	2	14	7	+7	16	Advanced to Final
3	–– Midlands	7	3	2	0	2	13	9	+4	16	Advanced to Third-place match
4	–– Auckland	7	3	0	3	1	15	13	+2	15	Advanced to Third-place match
5	–– Canterbury	7	2	2	3	0	18	8	+10	15	
6	–– Capital	7	2	1	2	2	11	14	−3	12	
7	–– Northland	7	1	2	1	3	12	17	−5	9	
8	–– Southern	7	0	0	0	7	4	32	−28	0	

Source: Hockey New Zealand
Rules for classification: 1) points; 2) matches won; 3) goal difference; 4) goals for; 5) head-to-head result; 6) field goals scored.

==== Fixtures ====
9 September 2018
14:00

Northland ––	0–4	–– North Harbour
	Report	Winterbottom 8'; Tice 27'; Pearce 34', 41'

Umpires:
Melanie Oakden (NZL)
Kirsten Stuckey (NZL)

9 September 2018
14:00

Auckland ––	1–1	–– Midlands
Smith 50'	Report	Davey 15'
Penalties
Tuilotolava (penalty shoot-out scored); Lench (penalty shoot-out scored); Inglis (penalty shoot-out missed); Steele (penalty shoot-out missed)	2–4	(penalty shoot-out scored) Lukin; (penalty shoot-out scored) Davey; (penalty shoot-out scored) Scharf; (penalty shoot-out scored) Jaques

Umpires:
Kelly Hudson (NZL)
Lani Jackman (NZL)

9 September 2018
14:00

Central ––	4–0	–– Capital
Cotter 1', 3', 56'; Shannon 44'	Report

Umpires:
Joanne Cumming (NZL)
Amber Church (NZL)

9 September 2018
14:00

Canterbury ––	9–1	–– Southern
Wium 12', 26', 42', 48'; MacLachlan 13'; Willis 27'; Fremaux 37'; Butt 53'; Cox 57'	Report	Shirley 47'

Umpires:
Katrina Turner (NZL)
Karen Bennett (NZL)

15 September 2018
10:30

Northland ––	4–0	–– Southern
Alexander 40', 56'; Cooper 43'; Smith 52'	Report

Umpires:
Rachel Murphy (NZL)
Kelly Hudson (NZL)

15 September 2018
12:30

Capital ––	2–2	–– Canterbury
Simmonds 19'; Smith 37'	Report	Butt 34', 46'
Penalties
MacAdre (penalty shoot-out missed); Simmonds (penalty shoot-out missed); Eastman (penalty shoot-out missed)	0–3	(penalty shoot-out scored) Fremaux; (penalty shoot-out scored) Willis; (penalty shoot-out scored) Tinning

Umpires:
Lani Jackman (NZL)
Joanne Cumming (NZL)

15 September 2018
14:30

Central ––	1–2	–– Midlands
Cotter 26'	Report	FitzSimons 8'; Morton 11'

Umpires:
Katrina Turner (NZL)
Melanie Oakden (NZL)

15 September 2018
16:00

North Harbour ––	4–1	–– Auckland
Pearson 18'; Pearce 44', 45', 48'	Report	Doar 23'

Umpires:
Amber Church (NZL)
Lucy Lawlor (NZL)

16 September 2018
10:30

Canterbury ––	2–2	–– Northland
Willis 44'; Grant 60'	Report	Taseska 3'; Smith 58'
Penalties
Fremaux (penalty shoot-out missed); Willis (penalty shoot-out scored); Tinning (penalty shoot-out scored); Grant (penalty shoot-out missed); Wium (penalty shoot-out scored) —— Fremaux (penalty shoot-out missed)	3–4	(penalty shoot-out scored) McDonnell; (penalty shoot-out missed) Taseska; (penalty shoot-out missed) Heywood; (penalty shoot-out scored) Gunson; (penalty shoot-out scored) Jones —— (penalty shoot-out scored) Gunson

Umpires:
Lucy Lawlor (NZL)
Lani Jackman (NZL)

16 September 2018
12:15

Southern ––	0–1	–– Central
	Report	Ralph 51'

Umpires:
Rachel Murphy (NZL)
Katrina Turner (NZL)

16 September 2018
14:30

Auckland ––	2–2	–– Capital
Ghalesha 30'; Lench 33'	Report	Cooper 21'; MacAdre 43'
Penalties
Tuilotolava (penalty shoot-out scored); Willis (penalty shoot-out missed); Lench (penalty shoot-out missed)	1–4	(penalty shoot-out scored) Reidy; (penalty shoot-out scored) Van Woerkom; (penalty shoot-out scored) Hull; (penalty shoot-out scored) MacAdre

Umpires:
Kelly Hudson (NZL)
Melanie Oakden (NZL)

16 September 2018
16:15

Midlands ––	0–3	–– North Harbour
	Report	Pearson 39', 44'; Pearce 45'

Umpires:
Amber Church (NZL)
Joanne Cumming (NZL)

17 September 2018
13:00

Northland ––	2–3	–– Auckland
McDonnell 47', 50'	Report	Steele 18'; Lench 31'; Dowe 60'

Umpires:
Amber Church (NZL)
Rachel Murphy (NZL)

17 September 2018
15:00

North Harbour ––	0–0	–– Central
	Report
Penalties
Elliot (penalty shoot-out scored); Pearce (penalty shoot-out missed); Webster (penalty shoot-out scored); Tice (penalty shoot-out missed); Pearson (penalty shoot-out missed) —— Webster (penalty shoot-out missed); Elliot (penalty shoot-out missed)	2–3	(penalty shoot-out missed) Ralph; (penalty shoot-out missed) Shannon; (penalty shoot-out scored) Norman; (penalty shoot-out scored) Rainey; (penalty shoot-out missed) Crowley —— (penalty shoot-out missed) Norman; (penalty shoot-out scored) Rainey

Umpires:
Katrina Turner (NZL)
Joanne Cumming (NZL)

17 September 2018
17:00

Midlands ––	0–2	–– Canterbury
	Report	Cox 38'; Anderson 60'

Umpires:
Kelly Hudson (NZL)
Lucy Lawlor (NZL)

17 September 2018
19:00

Southern ––	1–3	–– Capital
McNaughtan 41'	Report	McLean 19'; Seeley 56'; Simmonds 60'

Umpires:
Melanie Oakden (NZL)
Lani Jackman (NZL)

19 September 2018
13:00

Southern ––	0–5	–– Midlands
	Report	Jaques 19', 59'; Morton 30'; Robinson 41', 59'

Umpires:
Joanne Cumming (NZL)
Rachel Murphy (NZL)

19 September 2018
15:15

Capital ––	2–2	–– Northland
McLean 18'; Hull 24'	Report	Taseska 129'; Gunson 60+'
Penalties
Reidy (penalty shoot-out scored); Van Woerkom (penalty shoot-out missed); MacAdre (penalty shoot-out missed); Hull (penalty shoot-out missed); Smith (penalty shoot-out missed)	1–2	(penalty shoot-out missed) Heywood; (penalty shoot-out scored) Taseska; (penalty shoot-out missed) Doar; (penalty shoot-out missed) McDonnell; (penalty shoot-out scored) Gunson

Umpires:
Katrina Turner (NZL)
Lani Jackman (NZL)

19 September 2018
17:15

Auckland ––	3–2	–– Central
Ritchie 18'; Doar 24'; Ghalesha 58'	Report	Cotter 35', 36'

Umpires:
Lucy Lawlor (NZL)
Melanie Oakden (NZL)

19 September 2018
19:15

North Harbour ––	0–0	–– Canterbury
	Report
Penalties
Elliot (penalty shoot-out scored); Hyatt-Brown (penalty shoot-out missed); Webster (penalty shoot-out scored); Dickins (penalty shoot-out scored); Winterbottom (penalty shoot-out scored)	4–3	(penalty shoot-out missed) Willis; (penalty shoot-out scored) Wium; (penalty shoot-out missed) Tinning; (penalty shoot-out scored) MacLachlan; (penalty shoot-out scored) Grant

Umpires:
Kelly Hudson (NZL)
Amber Church (NZL)

20 September 2018
13:15

Midlands ––	2–2	–– Northland
Morton 51'; Davies 55'	Report	Laybourn 6'; Alexander 15'
Penalties
Davey (penalty shoot-out missed); Lukin (penalty shoot-out missed); Keddell (penalty shoot-out missed); Jaques (penalty shoot-out scored); Scharf (penalty shoot-out scored)	2–1	(penalty shoot-out scored) Gunson; (penalty shoot-out missed) McDonnell; (penalty shoot-out missed) Jones; (penalty shoot-out missed) Doar; (penalty shoot-out missed) Taseska

Umpires:
Amber Church (NZL)
Katrina Turner (NZL)

20 September 2018
15:15

Auckland ––	4–1	–– Southern
Ritchie 6', 24', 34'; Steele 57'	Report	Jopp 31'

Umpires:
Lucy Lawlor (NZL)
Rachel Murphy (NZL)

20 September 2018
17:15

Central ––	2–2	–– Canterbury
Damons 2'; Ralph 14'	Report	Wium 12'; Fremaux 60'
Penalties
Ralph (penalty shoot-out scored); Shannon (penalty shoot-out missed); Norman (penalty shoot-out scored); Rainey (penalty shoot-out missed)	2–0	(penalty shoot-out missed) Willis; (penalty shoot-out missed) Wium; (penalty shoot-out missed) Tinning; (penalty shoot-out missed) MacLachlan

Umpires:
Kelly Hudson (NZL)
Lani Jackman (NZL)

20 September 2018
19:15

Capital ––	2–0	–– North Harbour
MacAdre 11'; Eastman 57'	Report

Umpires:
Joanne Cumming (NZL)
Melanie Oakden (NZL)

22 September 2018
10:00

Northland ––	0–4	–– Central
	Report	Norman 5'; Walraven 19'; Cotter 36'; Shannon 57'

Umpires:
Melanie Oakden (NZL)
Rachel Murphy (NZL)

22 September 2018
12:00

Canterbury ––	1–1	–– Auckland
Butt 26'	Report	Smith 43'
Penalties
Fremaux (penalty shoot-out scored); Wium (penalty shoot-out scored); Tinning (penalty shoot-out scored); Willis (penalty shoot-out missed)	3–2	(penalty shoot-out missed) Tuilotolava; (penalty shoot-out missed) Ghalesha; (penalty shoot-out scored) Ritchie; (penalty shoot-out scored) Steele; (penalty shoot-out missed) Dowe

Umpires:
Amber Church (NZL)
Lani Jackman (NZL)

22 September 2018
14:15

Midlands ––	3–0	–– Capital
Morton 13'; Tanner 17'; FitzSimons 29'	Report

Umpires:
Kelly Hudson (NZL)
Joanne Cumming (NZL)

22 September 2018
16:15

North Harbour ––	6–1	–– Southern
Hyatt-Brown 4'; Dickins 36', 58'; Pearson 39'; Webster 45'; Winterbottom 57'	Report	Carey 32'

Umpires:
Lucy Lawlor (NZL)
Katrina Turner (NZL)

=== Classification round ===
==== Seventh and eighth place ====
23 September 2018
09:15

Northland ––	2–1	–– Southern
Doar 15'; Jones 43'	Report	Peyroux 32'

Umpires:
Katrina Turner (NZL)
Rachel Murphy (NZL)

==== Fifth and sixth place ====
23 September 2018
09:30

Canterbury ––	3–2	–– Capital
Fremaux 5'; MacLachlan 36'; Willis 45'	Report	Reidy 18'; Eastman 53'

Umpires:
Melanie Oakden (NZL)
Lucy Lawlor (NZL)

==== Third and fourth place ====
23 September 2018
09:45

Midlands ––	1–0	–– Auckland
Scharf 13'	Report

Umpires:
Lani Jackman (NZL)
Joanne Cumming (NZL)

==== Final ====
23 September 2018
13:45

North Harbour ––	2–0	–– Central
Winterbottom 26'; Pearce 42'	Report

Umpires:
Amber Church (NZL)
Kelly Hudson (NZL)

== Statistics ==
=== Final standings ===
Pos	Team	Pld	W	WD	LD	L	GF	GA	GD	Pts	Qualification
1st place, gold medalist(s)	–– North Harbour	8	5	1	1	1	19	4	+15	23	Gold Medal
2nd place, silver medalist(s)	–– Central	8	3	2	0	3	14	9	+5	16	Silver Medal
3rd place, bronze medalist(s)	–– Midlands	8	4	2	0	2	14	9	+5	20	Bronze Medal
4	–– Auckland	8	3	0	3	2	15	14	+1	15	
5	–– Canterbury	8	3	2	3	0	21	10	+11	19	
6	–– Capital	8	2	1	2	3	13	17	−4	12	
7	–– Northland	8	2	2	1	3	14	18	−4	13	
8	–– Southern	8	0	0	0	8	5	34	−29	0	

Source: Hockey New Zealand

=== Goalscorers ===
There were 115 goals scored in 32 matches, for an average of 3.59 goals per match.

7 goals

- –– Kaitlin Cotter
- –– Kirsten Pearce

5 goals

- –– Emily Wium

4 goals

- –– Deanna Ritchie
- –– Leah Butt
- –– Georgia Morton
- –– Holly Pearson

3 goals

- –– Sian Fremaux
- –– Margot Willis
- –– Anna Alexander
- –– Courtney Winterbottom

2 goals

- –– Katie Doar
- –– Tyler Lench
- –– Ghalesha Singh
- –– Belinda Smith
- –– Phoebe Steele
- –– Hayley Cox
- –– Euleena MacLachlan
- –– Charlotte Eastman
- –– Estelle MacAdre
- –– Maddison McLean
- –– Madeleine Simmonds
- –– Hope Ralph
- –– Olivia Shannon
- –– Natasha FitzSimons
- –– Alia Jaques
- –– Amy Robinson
- –– Nicola McDonnell
- –– Gabrielle Smith
- –– Tina Taseska
- –– Stephanie Dickins

1 goal

- –– Maddison Dowe
- –– Jessica Anderson
- –– Jordan Grant
- –– Sara Cooper
- –– Megan Hull
- –– Felicity Reidy
- –– Grace Seeley
- –– Kelsey Smith
- –– Sulette Damons
- –– Pippa Norman
- –– Nicole Walraven
- –– Tarryn Davey
- –– Frances Davies
- –– Viola Scharf
- –– Kim Tanner
- –– Anna Cooper
- –– Madison Doar
- –– Elizabeth Gunson
- –– Danielle Jones
- –– Alana Laybourn
- –– Ella Hyatt-Brown
- –– Elena Tice
- –– Petrea Webster
- –– Tinesha Carey
- –– Tessa Jopp
- –– Emily McNaughtan
- –– Claudia Peyroux
- –– Lydia Shirley
