= 2009 Women's Ford National Hockey League =

Women's field hockey tournament

Tournament details
- Host country: New Zealand
- Dates: 12–27 September
- Teams: 8
- Venue: 5 (in 5 host cities)

Final positions
- Champions: –– Central (2nd title)
- Runner-up: –– Midlands
- Third place: –– North Harbour

Tournament statistics
- Matches played: 32
- Top scorer(s): –– Kayla Sharland –– Gemma Flynn (8 goals)
- Best player: –– Clarissa Eshuis

The 2009 Women's Ford National Hockey League was the 11th edition of the women's field hockey tournament in New Zealand. The competition was held in five cities across the country, from 12 to 27 September.

Central won the title for the second time, defeating Midlands 4–3 in the final. North Harbour finished in third place after winning the bronze medal match 2–1 over Auckland.

== Participating teams ==
The following eight teams competed for the title:

- –– Auckland
- –– Canterbury
- –– Central
- –– Midlands
- –– Northland
- –– North Harbour
- –– Southern
- –– Wellington

== Results ==
=== Preliminary round ===
Pos	Team	Pld	W	D	L	GF	GA	GD	Pts	Qualification
1	–– Central	7	6	0	1	20	6	+14	18	Advanced to Semi-Finals
2	–– Midlands	7	5	0	2	22	7	+15	15	Advanced to Semi-Finals
3	–– Auckland	7	4	1	2	14	8	+6	13	Advanced to Semi-Finals
4	–– North Harbour	7	4	0	3	18	10	+8	12	Advanced to Semi-Finals
5	–– Wellington	7	3	0	4	17	19	−2	9	
6	–– Canterbury	7	3	0	4	12	15	−3	9	
7	–– Northland	7	1	2	4	10	15	−5	5	
8	–– Southern	7	0	1	6	2	35	−33	1	

Source: Hockey New Zealand
Rules for classification: 1) points; 2) matches won; 3) goal difference; 4) goals for; 5) head-to-head result; 6) field goals scored.

==== Fixtures ====
12 September 2009
13:00

Midlands ––	2–0	–– Auckland
Eshuis 17'; Flynn 41'	Report

Gallagher Hockey Centre, Hamilton

12 September 2009
13:00

Northland ––	2–4	–– North Harbour
Weir 45', 48'	Report	S. Michelsen 3'; C. Michelsen 9'; McQuinn 42'; Edwards 62'

Northland Hockey Association, Whangārei

12 September 2009
13:00

Central ––	5–2	–– Wellington
Paewai 12'; Drysdale 31'; K. Sharland 37'; Hamahona 49'; Curtis 58'	Report	N. Roberts 8'; Küfer 64'

Hockey Manawatu Inc., Palmerston North

13 September 2009
11:00

Southern ––	0–6	–– Canterbury
	Report	Wetherall 15'; Wall 21'; Morrison 23'; Perry 46'; B. Blackwood 51'; Fremaux 57'

Otago Hockey Association, Dunedin

19 September 2009
12:00

Midlands ––	10–0	–– Southern
Wharerau 13', 14'; Wickens 24'; Flynn 29', 34', 60'; Eshuis 38'; McGarvey 40'; Finlayson 55'; Maunder 67'	Report

Porritt Park, Christchurch

19 September 2009
14:00

Canterbury ––	2–1	–– Northland
Saunders 5', 70'	Report	Thorpe 47'

Porritt Park, Christchurch

19 September 2009
15:00

Auckland ––	1–4	–– Wellington
Forgesson 54'	Report	N. Roberts 11', 19'; Küfer 17'; Punt 32'

Porritt Park, Christchurch

19 September 2009
17:00

North Harbour ––	1–3	–– Central
S. Michelsen 39'	Report	Paewai 18', 57'; K. Sharland 53'

Porritt Park, Christchurch

20 September 2009
11:00

Northland ––	1–3	–– Midlands
Thorpe 22'	Report	Eshuis 10'; McGarvey 15'; Flynn 61'

Porritt Park, Christchurch

20 September 2009
13:00

Wellington ––	4–0	–– Southern
Muirhead 30'; Schürmann 43'; Küfer 51'; N. Roberts 64'	Report

Porritt Park, Christchurch

20 September 2009
16:00

North Harbour ––	3–0	–– Canterbury
Green 2'; Buchanan 52'; Webster 68'	Report

Porritt Park, Christchurch

20 September 2009
18:00

Auckland ––	1–0	–– Central
Forgesson 65'	Report

Porritt Park, Christchurch

21 September 2009
11:00

Wellington ––	2–3	–– Midlands
Hall 19'; Muirhead 45'	Report	Eshuis 7'; Flynn 9'; Bagley 66'

Porritt Park, Christchurch

21 September 2009
13:00

Southern ––	1–4	–– North Harbour
Wilson 14'	Report	Maloney 33'; Webster 44'; S. Michelsen 48'; McQuinn 60'

Porritt Park, Christchurch

21 September 2009
15:00

Canterbury ––	0–2	–– Auckland
	Report	S. Harrison 16'; Forgesson 36'

Porritt Park, Christchurch

21 September 2009
17:00

Central ––	2–1	–– Northland
K. Sharland 23', 59'	Report	J. McLeod 64'

Porritt Park, Christchurch

23 September 2009
12:00

Auckland ––	2–2	–– Northland
S. Harrison 56'; Glynn 70+'	Report	C. Harrison 4'; Pivac 47'

Porritt Park, Christchurch

23 September 2009
14:00

Central ––	3–0	–– Southern
O'Callaghan 8'; K. Sharland 10'; Hamahona 51'	Report

Porritt Park, Christchurch

23 September 2009
16:00

Midlands ––	1–2	–– Canterbury
McGarvey 5'	Report	Maley 11'; Wetherall 34'

Porritt Park, Christchurch

23 September 2009
16:00

North Harbour ––	6–1	–– Wellington
Dunn 6', 53'; S. Michelsen 37', 50'; McQuinn 67'; Webster 68'	Report	Punt 44'

Porritt Park, Christchurch

24 September 2009
13:00

Southern ––	0–7	–– Auckland
	Report	Ryan 1'; Glynn 13', 14', 49'; Dorrington 27'; Forgesson 50', 56'

Porritt Park, Christchurch

24 September 2009
15:00

Northland ––	2–1	–– Wellington
J. McLeod 15'; Weir 41'	Report	Küfer 58'

Porritt Park, Christchurch

24 September 2009
17:00

North Harbour ––	0–2	–– Midlands
	Report	McGarvey 11'; Eshuis 68'

Porritt Park, Christchurch

24 September 2009
19:00

Canterbury ––	0–5	–– Central
	Report	Curtis 3'; O'Callaghan 32', 39'; Paewai 48'; Hamahona 65'

Porritt Park, Christchurch

26 September 2009
09:00

Northland ––	1–1	–– Southern
Williams 16'	Report	Watson 30'

Porritt Park, Christchurch

26 September 2009
10:00

Auckland ––	1–0	–– North Harbour
Ryan 61'	Report

Porritt Park, Christchurch

26 September 2009
13:00

Midlands ––	1–2	–– Central
Flynn 12'	Report	Paewai 65'; Hamahona 69'

Porritt Park, Christchurch

26 September 2009
14:00

Wellington ––	3–2	–– Canterbury
Schürmann 13'; Marshall 34'; Hall 35+'	Report	Maley 20'; Devine 59'

Porritt Park, Christchurch

=== Classification round ===
==== Seventh and eighth place ====
27 September 2009
08:00

Northland ––	6–0	–– Southern
Pivac 1'; J. McLeod 2', 6'; Weir 41'; Rowsell 51'; Douglas 55'	Report

Porritt Park, Christchurch
Umpires:
Carlene Goad (NZL)
Helen Travers (NZL)

==== Fifth and sixth place ====
27 September 2009
12:00

Wellington ––	3–2	–– Canterbury
A. Roberts 9'; Schürmann 15'; Shaw 63'	Report	Hayward 11'; Merry 28'

Porritt Park, Christchurch
Umpires:
Karen Bennett (NZL)
Toni Maddaford (NZL)

==== Third and fourth place ====
27 September 2009
09:00

Auckland ––	1–2	–– North Harbour
Kight 54'	Report	S. Michelsen 4'; Buchanan 50'

Porritt Park, Christchurch
Umpires:
Aleesha Unka (NZL)
Amber Church (NZL)

==== Final ====
27 September 2009
13:20

Central ––	4–3 (a.e.t.)	–– Midlands
Hamahona 9'; K. Sharland 52', 70+', 79'	Report	Eshuis 38', 42'; Flynn 54'

Porritt Park, Christchurch
Umpires:
Melanie Oakden (NZL)
Kelly Hudson (NZL)

== Statistics ==
=== Final standings ===
Pos	Team	Pld	W	D	L	GF	GA	GD	Pts	Qualification
1st place, gold medalist(s)	–– Central	8	7	0	1	24	9	+15	21	Gold Medal
2nd place, silver medalist(s)	–– Midlands	8	5	0	3	25	11	+14	15	Silver Medal
3rd place, bronze medalist(s)	–– North Harbour	8	5	0	3	20	11	+9	15	Bronze Medal
4	–– Auckland	8	4	1	3	15	10	+5	13	
5	–– Wellington	8	4	0	4	20	21	−1	12	
6	–– Canterbury	8	3	0	5	14	18	−4	9	
7	–– Northland	8	2	2	4	16	15	+1	8	
8	–– Southern	8	0	1	7	2	41	−39	1	

Source: Hockey New Zealand

=== Goalscorers ===
There were 136 goals scored in 32 matches, for an average of 4.25 goals per match.

8 goals

- –– Kayla Sharland
- –– Gemma Flynn

7 goals

- –– Clarissa Eshuis

6 goals

- –– Stacey Michelsen

5 goals

- –– Krystal Forgesson
- –– Piki Hamahona
- –– Caryn Paewai

4 goals

- –– Katie Glynn
- –– Tambra McGarvey
- –– Jade McLeod
- –– Anna Weir
- –– Lisa Küfer
- –– Niniwa Roberts

3 goals

- –– Katrina O'Callaghan
- –– Jasmin McQuinn
- –– Petrea Webster
- –– Svenja Schürmann

2 goals

- –– Samantha Harrison
- –– Elizabeth Ryan
- –– Jane Maley
- –– Kate Saunders
- –– Anna Wetherall
- –– Michaela Curtis
- –– Lymarah Wharerau
- –– Alyx Pivac
- –– Anna Thorpe
- –– Rhianna Buchanan
- –– Kelsey Dunn
- –– Tara Hall
- –– Suzanne Muirhead
- –– Anita Punt

1 goal

- –– Nicola Dorrington
- –– Bridget Kight
- –– Bridget Blackwood
- –– Sophie Devine
- –– Sian Fremaux
- –– Pippa Hayward
- –– Olivia Merry
- –– Fiona Morrison
- –– Elizabeth Perry
- –– Megan Wall
- –– Tara Drysdale
- –– Jessica Bagley
- –– Cathryn Finlayson
- –– Danielle Maunder
- –– Sophie Wickens
- –– Laura Douglas
- –– Charlotte Harrison
- –– Rhonda Rowsell
- –– Rebekah Williams
- –– Jaimee Edwards
- –– Kimberley Green
- –– Karlie Maloney
- –– Carli Michelsen
- –– Eloise Watson
- –– Monique Wilson
- –– Kareena Marshall
- –– Aniwaka Roberts
- –– Frances Shaw
