= 2012 Women's Ford National Hockey League =

Tournament details
- Host country: New Zealand
- Dates: 18 August – 2 September
- Teams: 8
- Venue: 9 (in 8 host cities)

Final positions
- Champions: –– Canterbury (2nd title)
- Runner-up: –– Auckland
- Third place: –– North Harbour

Tournament statistics
- Matches played: 36
- Top scorer: –– Olivia Merry (10 goals)
- Best player: –– Stacey Carr

The 2012 Women's Ford National Hockey League was the 14th edition of the women's field hockey tournament. The competition was held in eight cities across New Zealand, from 18 August to 2 September.

Canterbury won the title for the second time, defeating Auckland 3–1 in the final. North Harbour finished in third place after winning the bronze medal match 3–2 over Midlands.

== Participating teams ==
The following eight teams competed for the title:

- –– Auckland
- –– Canterbury
- –– Capital
- –– Central
- –– Midlands
- –– Northland
- –– North Harbour
- –– Southern

== Results ==
=== Preliminary round ===
Pos	Team	Pld	W	WD	LD	L	GF	GA	GD	Pts	Qualification
1	–– Canterbury	7	7	0	0	0	25	6	+19	28	Advanced to Semi-Finals
2	–– Auckland	7	5	0	0	2	21	9	+12	20	Advanced to Semi-Finals
3	–– Midlands	7	4	1	0	2	18	7	+11	18	Advanced to Semi-Finals
4	–– North Harbour	7	4	0	1	2	16	7	+9	17	Advanced to Semi-Finals
5	–– Capital	7	3	1	0	3	10	16	−6	14	
6	–– Southern	7	2	0	1	4	11	19	−8	9	
7	–– Central	7	1	0	0	6	9	21	−12	4	
8	–– Northland	7	0	0	0	7	7	32	−25	0	

Source: Hockey New Zealand
Rules for classification: 1) points; 2) matches won; 3) goal difference; 4) goals for; 5) head-to-head result; 6) field goals scored.

==== Fixtures ====
18 August 2012
11:00

Canterbury ––	4–1	–– Southern
Merry 3', 51', 54'; Devine 44'	Report	S. McLeod 50'

Aorangi Park, Timaru

18 August 2012
11:30

Capital ––	3–2	–– Central
Hall 14', 62'; Terry 31'	Report	Paewai 38'; Curtis 64'

National Hockey Stadium,
Wellington

18 August 2012
12:00

Northland ––	1–7	–– Auckland
Vette 55'	Report	Youman 1', 59'; Saunders 13'; Wetherall 25', 28'; Glauser 44'; Carter 50'

Northland Hockey Association,
Whangārei

18 August 2012
12:00

Midlands ––	1–1	–– North Harbour
MacDonald 15'	Report	Dennison 29'
Penalties
	5–4

Gallagher Hockey Centre,
Hamilton

19 August 2012
12:00

Southern ––	1–1	–– Capital
Symes 12'	Report	Cole 54'
Penalties
	2–3

Otago Hockey Association,
Dunedin

19 August 2012
13:00

Auckland ––	2–1	–– Midlands
Wetherall 23'; Carter 37'	Report	MacDonald 57'

Lloyd Elsmore Hockey Stadium,
Auckland

19 August 2012
13:00

North Harbour ––	6–0	–– Northland
FitzSimons 8', 40'; Webster 25', 61', 67'; C. Michelsen 56'	Report

North Harbour Hockey Stadium,
Auckland

19 August 2012
13:00

Central ––	0–3	–– Canterbury
	Report	B. Blackwood 34'; Merry 46'; Fremaux 66'

Donnelly Park,
Levin

25 August 2012
11:00

Central ––	3–0	–– Northland
Hibbard 3'; K. Anderson 10'; G. Blackwood 42'	Report

Lloyd Elsmore Hockey Stadium,
Auckland

25 August 2012
13:00

Midlands ––	4–0	–– Capital
Finlayson 43'; Cochrane 45'; Eshuis 53'; Tanner 68'	Report

Lloyd Elsmore Hockey Stadium,
Auckland

25 August 2012
15:00

Auckland ––	2–3	–– Canterbury
Carter 46'; Hollywood 51'	Report	Merry 14'; McCann 26'; Cocks 48'

Lloyd Elsmore Hockey Stadium,
Auckland

25 August 2012
17:00

Southern ––	1–2	–– North Harbour
S. McLeod 7'	Report	Duley 32'; Goad 47'

Lloyd Elsmore Hockey Stadium,
Auckland

26 August 2012
11:00

Canterbury ––	6–2	–– Northland
Burnside 9'; Merry 37', 39'; B. Blackwood 45'; Devine 54'; Morrison 61'	Report	Pivac 44'; J. McLeod 69'

Lloyd Elsmore Hockey Stadium,
Auckland

26 August 2012
13:00

Auckland ––	3–2	–– Capital
Glynn 18', 49', 65'	Report	Hall 33'; O'Callaghan 46'

Lloyd Elsmore Hockey Stadium,
Auckland

26 August 2012
15:00

North Harbour ––	5–1	–– Central
Edwards 12'; Clarke 27', 70'; Webster 52'; Henry 62'	Report	K. Anderson 16'

Lloyd Elsmore Hockey Stadium,
Auckland

26 August 2012
17:00

Midlands ––	4–1	–– Southern
MacDonald 20', 40'; Charlton 58'; Gloyn 60'	Report	Symes 2'

Lloyd Elsmore Hockey Stadium,
Auckland

27 August 2012
12:00

Capital ––	1–0	–– North Harbour
Terry 5'	Report

Lloyd Elsmore Hockey Stadium,
Auckland

27 August 2012
14:00

Northland ––	2–3	–– Southern
Vette 36'; Nichol 38'	Report	Symes 14', 41'; Wilson 58'

Lloyd Elsmore Hockey Stadium,
Auckland

27 August 2012
16:00

Canterbury ––	2–0	–– Midlands
Grant 9'; Reid 12'	Report

Lloyd Elsmore Hockey Stadium,
Auckland

27 August 2012
18:00

Central ––	0–3	–– Auckland
	Report	Glynn 4', 17'; Carter 55'

Lloyd Elsmore Hockey Stadium,
Auckland

29 August 2012
12:00

Midlands ––	4–1	–– Central
Gill 8'; MacDonald 62', 63'; Johnson 67'	Report	Hibbard 10'

Lloyd Elsmore Hockey Stadium,
Auckland

29 August 2012
14:00

North Harbour ––	1–3	–– Canterbury
C. Michelsen 50'	Report	Fremaux 26'; B. Blackwood 52'; Merry 63'

Lloyd Elsmore Hockey Stadium,
Auckland

29 August 2012
16:00

Southern ––	1–4	–– Auckland
Heaps 56'	Report	Youman 4', 32'; Glynn 45'; Sutherland 66'

Lloyd Elsmore Hockey Stadium,
Auckland

29 August 2012
18:00

Northland ––	2–3	–– Capital
Millington 37'; Thompson 44'	Report	O'Callaghan 12'; Roberts 30'; Hall 52'

Lloyd Elsmore Hockey Stadium,
Auckland

30 August 2012
12:00

Central ––	2–3	–– Southern
Curtis 17'; Haenga 70+'	Report	S. McLeod 30', 34'; Wilson 60'

Lloyd Elsmore Hockey Stadium,
Auckland

30 August 2012
14:00

Capital ––	0–4	–– Canterbury
	Report	Marshall 7', 17'; Reid 49'; Fremaux 60'

Lloyd Elsmore Hockey Stadium,
Auckland

30 August 2012
16:00

Northland ––	0–4	–– Midlands
	Report	Gill 2'; MacDonald 4'; Eshuis 59'; Tanner 64'

Lloyd Elsmore Hockey Stadium,
Auckland

30 August 2012
18:00

Auckland ––	0–1	–– North Harbour
	Report	Webster 68'

Lloyd Elsmore Hockey Stadium,
Auckland

=== Classification round ===
==== Fifth to eighth place classification ====
Crossover
1 September 2012
–– Capital	7
–– Northland	2
1 September 2012
–– Southern	1
–– Central (a.e.t)	2

Fifth Place
2 September 2012
–– Capital	2
–– Central	3
Seventh Place
2 September 2012
–– Northland	1
–– Southern (a.e.t)	2

===== Crossover =====
1 September 2012
09:00

Capital ––	7–2	–– Northland
Reidy 2'; J. Anderson 14', 61'; Roberts 21'; Hall 33'; Terry 48'; Groen 69'	Report	Nichol 5'; MacAlister 40'

Lloyd Elsmore Hockey Stadium,
Auckland

1 September 2012
11:00

Southern ––	1–2 (a.e.t.)	–– Central
Lane 23'	Report	Mountain 55'; G. Blackwood 78'

Lloyd Elsmore Hockey Stadium,
Auckland

===== Seventh and eighth place =====
2 September 2012
08:30

Northland ––	1–2 (a.e.t.)	–– Southern
Nana 45'	Report	Lane 62'; S. McLeod 72'

Lloyd Elsmore Hockey Stadium,
Auckland

===== Fifth and sixth place =====
2 September 2012
14:30

Capital ––	2–3	–– Central
Roberts 19'; O'Callaghan 58'	Report	Hibbard 11'; Curtis 35+'; Weber 38'

Lloyd Elsmore Hockey Stadium,
Auckland

==== First to fourth place classification ====
Semi-finals
1 September 2012
–– Canterbury	2
–– North Harbour	1
1 September 2012
–– Auckland	7
–– Midlands	0

Final
2 September 2012
–– Canterbury	3
–– Auckland	1
Third Place
2 September 2012
–– North Harbour	3
–– Midlands	2

===== Semi-finals =====
1 September 2012
15:00

Auckland ––	7–0	–– Midlands
Glynn 12', 42', 55'; Carter 29', 44', 50'; Glauser 45'	Report

Lloyd Elsmore Hockey Stadium,
Auckland

1 September 2012
15:00

Canterbury ––	2–1	–– North Harbour
Fremaux 4'; Merry 11'	Report	Clarke 59'

Lloyd Elsmore Hockey Stadium,
Auckland

===== Third and fourth place =====
2 September 2012
10:40

North Harbour ––	3–2	–– Midlands
A. Green 8'; Clarke 10'; Webster 58'	Report	Gloyn 44', 54'

Lloyd Elsmore Hockey Stadium,
Auckland

===== Final =====
2 September 2012
15:00

Canterbury ––	3–1	–– Auckland
Merry 16'; Hayward 34'; Burnside 64'	Report	Hollywood 41'

Lloyd Elsmore Hockey Stadium,
Auckland

== Statistics ==
=== Final standings ===
Pos	Team	Pld	W	WD	LD	L	GF	GA	GD	Pts	Qualification
1st place, gold medalist(s)	–– Canterbury	9	9	0	0	0	30	8	+22	36	Gold Medal
2nd place, silver medalist(s)	–– Auckland	9	6	0	0	3	29	12	+17	24	Silver Medal
3rd place, bronze medalist(s)	–– North Harbour	9	5	0	1	3	20	11	+9	21	Bronze Medal
4	–– Midlands	9	4	1	0	4	20	17	+3	18	
5	–– Central	9	3	0	0	6	14	24	−10	12	
6	–– Capital	9	4	1	0	4	19	21	−2	18	
7	–– Southern	9	3	0	1	5	14	22	−8	13	
8	–– Northland	9	0	0	0	9	10	41	−31	0	

Source: Hockey New Zealand

=== Goalscorers ===
There were 156 goals scored in 36 matches, for an average of 4.33 goals per match.

10 goals

- –– Olivia Merry

9 goals

- –– Katie Glynn

7 goals

- –– Honor Carter
- –– Stacey MacDonald

6 goals

- –– Petrea Webster

5 goals

- –– Tara Hall
- –– Sofie McLeod

4 goals

- –– Nicole Youman
- –– Sian Fremaux
- –– Jane Clarke
- –– Phillipa Symes

3 goals

- –– Anna Wetherall
- –– Bridget Blackwood
- –– Katrina O'Callaghan
- –– Aniwaka Roberts
- –– Morgan Terry
- –– Michaela Curtis
- –– Merania Hibbard
- –– Shiloh Gloyn

2 goals

- –– Kushla Glauser
- –– Kate Hollywood
- –– Tenille Burnside
- –– Sophie Devine
- –– Hannah Marshall
- –– Cassandra Reid
- –– Jenna Anderson
- –– Kristy Anderson
- –– Georgina Blackwood
- –– Clarissa Eshuis
- –– Kimberley Gill
- –– Kim Tanner
- –– Jodie Nichol
- –– Tarannah Vette
- –– Natasha FitzSimons
- –– Carli Michelsen
- –– Paige Lane
- –– Monique Wilson

1 goal

- –– Kate Saunders
- –– Danielle Sutherland
- –– Sophie Cocks
- –– Jordan Grant
- –– Pippa Hayward
- –– Fiona Morrison
- –– Rachel McCann
- –– Kristy Cole
- –– Maartje Groen
- –– Felicity Reidy
- –– Lee-Ana Haenga
- –– Barbara Mountain
- –– Caryn Paewai
- –– Erin Weber
- –– Samantha Charlton
- –– Shannon Cochrane
- –– Cathryn Finlayson
- –– Abbie Johnson
- –– Jessica MacAlister
- –– Jade McLeod
- –– Alana Millington
- –– Shareena Nana
- –– Alyx Pivac
- –– Jane Thompson
- –– Rhiannon Dennison
- –– Hannah Duley
- –– Jamee Edwards
- –– Erin Goad
- –– Amanda Green
- –– Kathryn Henry
- –– Aimee Heaps
