= 2012 Men's Ford National Hockey League =

Tournament details
- Host country: New Zealand
- Dates: 18 August – 2 September
- Teams: 8
- Venue(s): 9 (in 8 host cities)

Final positions
- Champions: –– Auckland (2nd title)
- Runner-up: –– Southern
- Third place: –– North Harbour

Tournament statistics
- Matches played: 36
- Goals scored: 195 (5.42 per match)
- Top scorer(s): –– Nicholas Wilson (12 goals)
- Best player: –– Blair Tarrant

The 2012 Men's Ford National Hockey League was the 14th edition of the men's field hockey tournament. The competition was held in various cities across New Zealand, from 18 August to 2 September.

Auckland won the title for the third time, defeating Southern 2–1 in extra time. North Harbour finished in third place, defeating Capital 6–5 in the third place match.

== Participating teams ==
The following eight teams competed for the title:

- –– Auckland
- –– Canterbury
- –– Capital
- –– Central
- –– Midlands
- –– Northland
- –– North Harbour
- –– Southern

== Results ==
All times are local (NZST).

=== Preliminary round ===
Pos	Team	Pld	W	WD	LD	L	GF	GA	GD	Pts	Qualification
1	–– Capital	7	4	2	0	1	26	17	+9	20	Advanced to Semi-Finals
2	–– North Harbour	7	4	0	2	1	18	9	+9	18	Advanced to Semi-Finals
3	–– Auckland	7	4	0	1	2	27	10	+17	17	Advanced to Semi-Finals
4	–– Southern	7	4	0	0	3	14	15	−1	16	Advanced to Semi-Finals
5	–– Midlands	7	4	0	0	3	23	18	+5	16	
6	–– Central	7	2	1	0	4	14	17	−3	10	
7	–– Canterbury	7	2	0	1	4	14	22	−8	9	
8	–– Northland	7	0	1	0	6	9	37	−28	2	

Source: Hockey New Zealand
Rules for classification: 1) points; 2) matches won; 3) head-to-head result; 4) goal difference; 5) goals for; 6) field goals scored.

==== Fixtures ====
18 August 2012
13:00

Canterbury ––	3–1	–– Southern
Summers 19', 48'; I. Staples 31'	Report	Dungey 39'

Aorangi Park, Timaru

18 August 2012
13:30

Capital ––	4–2	–– Central
J. Smith 12'; L'Huillier 42'; Jones 50'; Gould 63'	Report	Wilson 5'; F. Watts 58'

National Hockey Stadium,
Wellington

18 August 2012
14:00

Northland ––	0–10	–– Auckland
	Report	Radovonich 24', 62', 65'; Morar 30'; Rowsell 41', 56'; S. Miskimmin 43', 45', 69'; Crooks 61'

Kensington Sports Park,
Whangārei

18 August 2012
14:00

Midlands ––	3–1	–– North Harbour
C. Hayde 15'; Churchill 18'; Clark 70+'	Report	Kosoof 25'

Gallagher Hockey Centre,
Hamilton

19 August 2012
14:00

Southern ––	4–3	–– Capital
Paterson 2'; Russell 37', 69'; Dungey 60'	Report	Crossett 22'; L'Huillier 46'; J. Smith 54'

Logan Park,
Dunedin

19 August 2012
15:00

Auckland ––	4–0	–– Midlands
Rowsell 9'; Radovonich 10'; M. Child 26'; Crooks 52'	Report

Lloyd Elsmore Hockey Stadium,
Auckland

19 August 2012
15:00

North Harbour ––	3–3	–– Northland
J. Bartholomew 11', 14'; Laidlaw 47'	Report	Gurr 7'; Ryan 32'; Webb 42'
Penalties
	2–3

North Harbour Hockey Stadium,
Auckland

19 August 2012
15:00

Central ––	3–0	–– Canterbury
R. Smith 23'; Wilson 36'; Cosgrove 49'	Report

Donnelly Park,
Levin

25 August 2012
11:00

Midlands ––	3–5	–– Capital
Churchill 2', 4'; Mitai-Ngatai 17'	Report	Gyles 22'; J. Smith 29', 41'; Barnett 39'; Jones 64'

Lloyd Elsmore Hockey Stadium,
Auckland

25 August 2012
13:00

Central ––	0–2	–– North Harbour
	Report	J. Bartholomew 40', 65'

Lloyd Elsmore Hockey Stadium,
Auckland

25 August 2012
15:00

Northland ––	1–6	–– Canterbury
Webb 34'	Report	Rahman 16'; I. Staples 30', 53'; Cocking 40'; M. Hayde 60'; Summers 60'

Lloyd Elsmore Hockey Stadium,
Auckland

25 August 2012
17:00

Southern ––	1–2	–– Auckland
Russell 3'	Report	A. Shaw 27'; Creffer 33'

Lloyd Elsmore Hockey Stadium,
Auckland

26 August 2012
11:00

Central ––	3–2	–– Northland
Wilson 45', 58'; R. Smith 47'	Report	D. Watts 12'; Ryan 53'

Lloyd Elsmore Hockey Stadium,
Auckland

26 August 2012
13:00

Capital ––	3–3	–– Canterbury
Van Woerkom 28'; D. Lett 30'; J. Hilton 44'	Report	Summers 51'; M. Hayde 54'; Wilbur 62'
Penalties
	4–3

Lloyd Elsmore Hockey Stadium,
Auckland

26 August 2012
15:00

North Harbour ––	3–0	–– Auckland
J. Bartholomew 19'; Kosoof 48'; Peterson 67'	Report

Lloyd Elsmore Hockey Stadium,
Auckland

26 August 2012
17:00

Southern ––	3–2	–– Midlands
Storey 4'; Russell 11'; Ashton 68'	Report	Rees-Gibbs 21', 57'

Lloyd Elsmore Hockey Stadium,
Auckland

27 August 2012
12:00

Capital ––	6–1	–– Northland
Van Woerkom 24'; L'Huillier 38', 40', 59', 62'; Jones 51'	Report	Tofeeq 10'

Lloyd Elsmore Hockey Stadium,
Auckland

27 August 2012
14:00

North Harbour ––	3–1	–– Southern
Coughlan 1'; Alexander-Parker 56'; Kosoof 66'	Report	Russell 30'

Lloyd Elsmore Hockey Stadium,
Auckland

27 August 2012
16:00

Auckland ––	3–3	–– Central
Keshoor 17'; Bilkey 45'; Crooks 52'	Report	R. Smith 12'; Wilson 39'; Cosgrove 65'
Penalties
	1–3

Lloyd Elsmore Hockey Stadium,
Auckland

27 August 2012
18:00

Canterbury ––	2–4	–– Midlands
I. Staples 8'; Davidson 61'	Report	C. Hayde 40'; Deavin 43', 53'; Clark 50'

Lloyd Elsmore Hockey Stadium,
Auckland

29 August 2012
12:00

Midlands ––	7–1	–– Northland
Churchill 3'; Ross 25', 29'; Rees-Gibbs 35'; A. Hayward 44'; Deavin 45'; Hughes 69'	Report	Gurr 55'

Lloyd Elsmore Hockey Stadium,
Auckland

29 August 2012
14:00

Central ––	1–2	–– Southern
Wilson 70+'	Report	Bailey 30', 58'

Lloyd Elsmore Hockey Stadium,
Auckland

29 August 2012
16:00

Capital ––	2–2	–– North Harbour
Van Woerkom 20'; L'Huillier 22'	Report	Kosoof 6'; Coughlan 54'
Penalties
	1–0

Lloyd Elsmore Hockey Stadium,
Auckland

29 August 2012
18:00

Auckland ––	6–0	–– Canterbury
S. Miskimmin 11'; A. Panchia 25'; Ritchie 39', 57'; Wickham 50'; K. Hari 63'	Report

Lloyd Elsmore Hockey Stadium,
Auckland

30 August 2012
12:00

Midlands ––	4–2	–– Central
Hughes 15', 31'; C. Hayde 49'; A. Hayward 56'	Report	Wilson 37'; Cosgrove 60'

Lloyd Elsmore Hockey Stadium,
Auckland

30 August 2012
14:00

Northland ––	1–2	–– Southern
D. Watts 48'	Report	Bailey 9'; Ashton 46'

Lloyd Elsmore Hockey Stadium,
Auckland

30 August 2012
16:00

Canterbury ––	0–4	–– North Harbour
	Report	Alexander-Parker 16'; Kosoof 19', 64'; Peterson 66'

Lloyd Elsmore Hockey Stadium,
Auckland

30 August 2012
18:00

Auckland ––	2–3	–– Capital
Rowsell 14'; S. Miskimmin 38'	Report	J. Hilton 8'; L'Huillier 19'; J. Smith 68'

Lloyd Elsmore Hockey Stadium,
Auckland

=== Classification round ===
==== Fifth to eighth place classification ====
Crossover
1 September 2012
–– Midlands	9
–– Northland	2
1 September 2012
–– Central (a.e.t)	5
–– Canterbury	4

Fifth Place
2 September 2012
–– Midlands	1
–– Central (a.e.t)	2
Seventh Place
2 September 2012
–– Northland	0
–– Canterbury	5

===== Crossover =====
1 September 2012
09:00

Midlands ––	9–2	–– Northland
Hughes 2'; A. Hayward 13', 37', 56', 58'; Deavin 40'; C. Hayde 45', 54'; Ross 68'	Report	Watts 18'; Gurr 62'

Lloyd Elsmore Hockey Stadium,
Auckland

1 September 2012
11:00

Central ––	5–4 (a.e.t.)	–– Canterbury
Wilson 14', 17', 60', 77'; Ewington 49'	Report	Kearney 6'; Brooks 19'; I. Staples 35+'; Davidson 66'

Lloyd Elsmore Hockey Stadium,
Auckland

===== Seventh and eighth place =====
2 September 2012
08:00

Northland ––	0–5	–– Canterbury
	Report	Summers 15'; I. Staples 28', 44', 51'; Cocking 62'

Lloyd Elsmore Hockey Stadium,
Auckland

===== Fifth and sixth place =====
2 September 2012
12:20

Midlands ––	1–2 (a.e.t.)	–– Central
Rees-Gibbs 27'	Report	Ewington 46'; Wilson 81'

Lloyd Elsmore Hockey Stadium,
Auckland

==== First to fourth place classification ====
Semi-finals
1 September 2012
–– Capital	1 (4)
–– Southern (pen.)	1 (5)
1 September 2012
–– North Harbour	2
–– Auckland	4

Final
2 September 2012
–– Southern	1
–– Auckland (a.e.t)	2
Third Place
2 September 2012
–– Capital	5
–– North Harbour (a.e.t)	6

===== Semi-finals =====
1 September 2012
13:00

Capital ––	1–1	–– Southern
L'Huillier 22'	Report	Paterson 61'
Penalties
	4–5

Lloyd Elsmore Hockey Stadium,
Auckland

1 September 2012
13:00

North Harbour ––	2–4	–– Auckland
Green 13'; Alexander-Parker 43'	Report	Crooks 32', 39'; Wickham 34'; Radovonich 57'

Lloyd Elsmore Hockey Stadium,
Auckland

===== Third and fourth place =====
2 September 2012
10:10

Capital ––	5–6 (a.e.t.)	–– North Harbour
L'Huillier 17'; Baker 44'; J. Smith 46'; Van Woerkom 51'; Kepes 67'	Report	L. Brill 8', 31'; J. Bartholomew 24'; S. Brill 52'; Kosoof 59'; Green 74'

Lloyd Elsmore Hockey Stadium,
Auckland

===== Final =====
2 September 2012
12:50

Southern ––	1–2 (a.e.t.)	–– Auckland
Russell 54'	Report	M. Child 4'; Wickham 71'

Lloyd Elsmore Hockey Stadium,
Auckland

== Statistics ==
=== Final standings ===
Pos	Team	Pld	W	WD	LD	L	GF	GA	GD	Pts	Qualification
1st place, gold medalist(s)	–– Auckland	9	6	0	1	2	33	13	+20	25	Gold Medal
2nd place, silver medalist(s)	–– Southern	9	4	1	0	4	16	18	−2	18	Silver Medal
3rd place, bronze medalist(s)	–– North Harbour	9	5	0	2	2	26	18	+8	22	Bronze Medal
4	–– Capital	9	4	2	1	2	32	24	+8	21	
5	–– Central	9	4	1	0	4	21	22	−1	18	
6	–– Midlands	9	5	0	0	4	33	22	+11	20	
7	–– Canterbury	9	3	0	1	5	23	27	−4	13	
8	–– Northland	9	0	1	0	8	11	51	−40	2	

Source: Hockey New Zealand

=== Goalscorers ===
There were 195 goals scored in 36 matches, for an average of 5.42 goals per match.

12 goals

- –– Nicholas Wilson

10 goals

- –– Matthew L'Huillier

8 goals

- –– Isaac Staples

7 goals

- –– David Kosoof

6 goals

- –– Jacob Smith
- –– Andrew Hayward
- –– Joseph Bartholomew
- –– Kane Russell

5 goals

- –– Joseph Crooks
- –– Samuel Miskimmin
- –– Benjamin Radovonich
- –– Trent Summers
- –– Cameron Hayde

4 goals

- –– Dwayne Rowsell
- –– Benedict van Woerkom
- –– Lincoln Churchill
- –– Timothy Deavin
- –– Scott Hughes
- –– Matthew Rees-Gibbs

3 goals

- –– Thomas Wickham
- –– Jared Jones
- –– Ryan Cosgrove
- –– Robin Smith
- –– Nicholas Ross
- –– Lloyd Gurr
- –– Dion Watts
- –– Brennan Alexander-Parker
- –– Callum Bailey

2 goals

- –– Marcus Child
- –– Michael Ritchie
- –– Ryan Cocking
- –– William Davidson
- –– Mitchell Hayde
- –– Jason Hilton
- –– Andrew Ewington
- –– Richard Clark
- –– Thomas Ryan
- –– Samuel Webb
- –– Lucas Brill
- –– James Coughlan
- –– David Green
- –– Jan Peterson
- –– Christopher Ashton
- –– Jason Dungey
- –– Robert Paterson

1 goal

- –– Jonathon Bilkey
- –– Robert Creffer
- –– Ketan Hari
- –– Jignesh Keshoor
- –– Veeran Morar
- –– Arun Panchia
- –– Alexander Shaw
- –– Gareth Brooks
- –– James Kearney
- –– Mohammed Ali Rahman
- –– Redvers Wilbur
- –– Joel Baker
- –– Scott Barnett
- –– Steven Crossett
- –– Todd Gould
- –– Timothy Gyles
- –– Gabriel Kepes
- –– Dane Lett
- –– Fergus Watts
- –– Hoete Mitai-Ngatai
- –– Muhammed Tofeeq
- –– Simon Brill
- –– Sean Laidlaw
- –– Richard Storey
