= 2017 Women's Ford National Hockey League =

Tournament details
- Host country: New Zealand
- City: Wellington
- Dates: 16–24 September
- Teams: 8
- Venue: National Hockey Stadium

Final positions
- Champions: –– Midlands (2nd title)
- Runner-up: –– Northland
- Third place: –– Auckland

Tournament statistics
- Matches played: 24
- Goals scored: 89 (3.71 per match)
- Top scorer(s): –– Rachel McCann –– Jodie Nichol (6 goals)
- Best player: –– Elizabeth Gunson

The 2017 Women's Ford National Hockey League was the 19th edition of the women's field hockey tournament. The competition was held in Wellington, New Zealand from 16–24 September.

The tournament saw an increase to eight teams from the seven that contested the 2016 edition.

Midlands won the title for the second time, defeating Northland 4–2 in the final. Auckland finished third after defeating North Harbour 3–0 in a penalty shoot-out after the third place match finished 1–1.

== Participating teams ==
- –– Auckland
- –– Canterbury
- –– Capital
- –– Central
- –– Midlands
- –– Northland
- –– North Harbour
- –– Southern

== Results ==
=== First round ===
==== Pool A ====
Pos	Team	Pld	W	WD	LD	L	PF	PA	PD	Pts
1	–– Auckland	3	3	0	0	0	5	1	+4	12
2	–– Canterbury	3	2	0	0	1	4	1	+3	8
3	–– Capital	3	1	0	0	2	4	5	−1	4
4	–– Southern	3	0	0	0	3	3	9	−6	0

Source: Hockey New Zealand

16 September 2017
10:45

Auckland ––	2–0	–– Capital
Steele 11'; Tuilotolava 41'	Report

Umpires:
Amber Church (NZL)
Lani Jackman (NZL)

16 September 2017
12:45

Canterbury ––	3–0	–– Southern
McCann 11'; Wium 35'; Kiddle 38'	Report

Umpires:
Lucy Lawlor (NZL)
Kelly Hudson (NZL)

17 September 2017
11:00

Auckland ––	2–1	–– Southern
King 5'; Ritchie 10'	Report	Duncan 11'

Umpires:
Karen Bennett (NZL)
Katrina Woolf (NZL)

17 September 2017
13:00

Capital ––	0–1	–– Canterbury
	Report	McCann 22'

Umpires:
Amber Church (NZL)
Julena Phillips (NZL)

19 September 2017
17:00

Canterbury ––	0–1	–– Auckland
	Report	Harrison 40'

Umpires:
Melanie Oakden (NZL)
Lucy Lawlor (NZL)

19 September 2017
19:00

Capital ––	4–2	–– Southern
Velzian 9'; Lawton 28'; Chisholm 57', 59'	Report	McLean 11'; Jopp 34'

Umpires:
Kelly Hudson (NZL)
Julena Phillips (NZL)

==== Pool B ====
Pos	Team	Pld	W	WD	LD	L	PF	PA	PD	Pts
1	–– Northland	3	2	1	0	0	9	7	+2	10
2	–– Midlands	3	2	0	0	1	7	4	+3	8
3	–– North Harbour	3	0	1	0	2	4	6	−2	2
4	–– Central	3	0	0	2	1	4	7	−3	2

Source: Hockey New Zealand

16 September 2017
14:45

Midlands ––	2–3	–– Northland
McCaw 4'; Gloyn 16'	Report	Lench 4'; McBurnie 23'; Michelsen 56'

Umpires:
Joanne Cumming (NZL)
Katrina Woolf (NZL)

16 September 2017
16:45

North Harbour ––	1–1	–– Central
Dickins 18'	Report	Rainey 14'
Penalties
Elliott (penalty shoot-out scored); Hyatt-Brown (penalty shoot-out missed); Dickins (penalty shoot-out scored); Teschke (penalty shoot-out missed); Henry (penalty shoot-out scored)	3–1	(penalty shoot-out missed) Carey; (penalty shoot-out missed) P. Norman; (penalty shoot-out scored) Curtis; (penalty shoot-out missed) Ralph

Umpires:
Julena Phillips (NZL)
Melanie Oakden (NZL)

17 September 2017
15:00

Midlands ––	4–1	–– Central
FitzSimons 1', 33', 56'; McCaw 25'	Report	Pearson 12'

Umpires:
Melanie Oakden (NZL)
Lucy Lawlor (NZL)

17 September 2017
17:00

Northland ––	4–3	–– North Harbour
Michelsen 5'; Ashton 15+'; Neal 20'; McBurnie 28'	Report	Polovnikoff 13'; Teschke 14'; Elliott 44'

Umpires:
Joanne Cumming (NZL)
Kelly Hudson (NZL)

19 September 2017
13:00

Northland ––	2–2	–– Central
Nichol 53', 58'	Report	Ralph 7'; Carey 17'
Penalties
Neal (penalty shoot-out missed); Lench (penalty shoot-out scored); Pilmer (penalty shoot-out missed); Michelsen (penalty shoot-out scored); Gunson (penalty shoot-out scored)	3–1	(penalty shoot-out missed) Whitelock; (penalty shoot-out scored) Norman; (penalty shoot-out missed) Curtis; (penalty shoot-out missed) Carey

Umpires:
Karen Bennett (NZL)
Lani Jackman (NZL)

19 September 2017
15:00

North Harbour ––	0–1	–– Midlands
	Report	McCaw 36'

Umpires:
Amber Church (NZL)
Katrina Woolf (NZL)

=== Classification round ===
Quarter-finals
21 September 2017
–– Auckland (pen.)	1 (3)
–– Central	1 (2)
21 September 2017
–– Midlands	1
–– Capital	0
21 September 2017
–– Northland	7
–– Southern	1
21 September 2017
–– Canterbury	1
–– North Harbour	2

Semi-finals
22 September 2017
–– Auckland	1
–– Midlands	3
22 September 2017
–– Northland	3
–– North Harbour	2

Final
24 September 2017
–– Midlands	4
–– Northland	2
Third Place
24 September 2017
–– Auckland (pen.)	1 (3)
–– North Harbour	1 (0)

==== Quarter-finals ====
21 September 2017
13:00

Northland ––	7–1	–– Southern
Neal 4', 37'; Nichol 25', 28', 51'; Gunson 33'; Michelsen 35'	Report	McLean 44'

Umpires:
Katrina Woolf (NZL)
Julena Phillips (NZL)

21 September 2017
13:15

Canterbury ––	1–2	–– North Harbour
Hayward 32'	Report	Dickins 18', 58'

Umpires:
Kelly Hudson (NZL)
Lani Jackman (NZL)

21 September 2017
15:00

Auckland ––	1–1	–– Central
Inglis 6'	Report	Rainey 7'
Penalties
Harrison (penalty shoot-out scored); King (penalty shoot-out missed); Jones (penalty shoot-out scored); Steele (penalty shoot-out missed); Middleton (penalty shoot-out missed) —— Harrison (penalty shoot-out scored)	3–2	(penalty shoot-out scored) Waddell; (penalty shoot-out missed) P. Norman; (penalty shoot-out missed) Curtis; (penalty shoot-out missed) Phillips; (penalty shoot-out scored) Pearson —— (penalty shoot-out missed) Curtis

Umpires:
Karen Bennett (NZL)
Lucy Lawlor (NZL)

21 September 2017
15:15

Midlands ––	1–0	Capital ––
McCaw 4'	Report

Umpires:
Joanne Cumming (NZL)
Melanie Oakden (NZL)

==== Fifth to eighth place classification ====
Crossover
22 September 2017
–– Central (pen.)	1 (3)
–– Capital	1 (1)
22 September 2017
–– Southern	1
–– Canterbury	7

Fifth Place
24 September 2017
–– Central	3
–– Canterbury	1
Seventh Place
24 September 2017
–– Capital	4
–– Southern	0

===== Crossover =====
22 September 2017
13:00

Southern ––	1–7	–– Canterbury
Jopp 25'	Report	McCann 3', 5', 11', 58'; Willis 12', 17', 56'

Umpires:
Lucy Lawlor (NZL)
Joanne Cumming (NZL)

22 September 2017
15:00

Central ––	1–1	–– Capital
McCullough 22'	Report	Chan 38'
Penalties
Waddell (penalty shoot-out missed); Pearson (penalty shoot-out scored); Curtis (penalty shoot-out scored); Phillips (penalty shoot-out scored)	3–1	(penalty shoot-out missed) Neil; (penalty shoot-out scored) Lawton; (penalty shoot-out missed) Roberts; (penalty shoot-out missed) MacAdre

Umpires:
Katrina Woolf (NZL)
Lani Jackman (NZL)

===== Seventh and eighth place =====
24 September 2017
08:30

Capital ––	4–0	–– Southern
Neil 18'; Eastman 38'; Edwards 39'; Lawton 58'	Report

Umpires:
Julena Phillips (NZL)
Lucy Lawlor (NZL)

===== Fifth and sixth place =====
24 September 2017
10:45

Central ––	3–1	–– Canterbury
Ralph 52', 53'; Whitelock 54'	Report	Kiddle 3'

Umpires:
Katrina Woolf (NZL)
Lani Jackman (NZL)

==== First to fourth place classification ====
===== Semi-finals =====
22 September 2017
17:00

Northland ––	3–2	–– North Harbour
Nichol 2'; Neal 58'; Gunson 59'	Report	Pearce 22'; Dickins 48'

Umpires:
Kelly Hudson (NZL)
Karen Bennett (NZL)

22 September 2017
19:00

Auckland ––	1–3	–– Midlands
King 49'	Report	Savory 12'; Gloyn 21'; FitzSimons 25'

Umpires:
Amber Church (NZL)
Melanie Oakden (NZL)

===== Third and fourth place =====
24 September 2017
09:00

Auckland ––	1–1	–– North Harbour
King 48'	Report	Polovnikoff 59'
Penalties
Harrison (penalty shoot-out scored); King (penalty shoot-out scored); Jones (penalty shoot-out scored)	3–0	(penalty shoot-out missed) Elliott; (penalty shoot-out missed) Hyatt-Brown; (penalty shoot-out missed) Dickins

Umpires:
Joanne Cumming (NZL)
Karen Bennett (NZL)

===== Final =====
24 September 2017
13:00

Midlands ––	4–2	–– Northland
McCaw 14'; Keddell 27'; Charlton 30'; Gloyn 33'	Report	Michelsen 31'; Gunson 43'

Umpires:
Kelly Hudson (NZL)
Amber Church (NZL)

== Statistics ==
=== Final standings ===
Pos	Team	Pld	W	WD	LD	L	GF	GA	GD	Pts	Qualification
1st place, gold medalist(s)	–– Midlands	6	5	0	0	1	15	7	+8	20	Gold Medal
2nd place, silver medalist(s)	–– Northland	6	4	1	0	1	21	14	+7	18	Silver Medal
3rd place, bronze medalist(s)	–– Auckland	6	3	2	0	1	8	6	+2	16	Bronze Medal
4	–– North Harbour	6	1	1	1	3	9	11	−2	7	
5	–– Central	6	1	1	3	1	9	10	−1	9	
6	–– Canterbury	6	3	0	0	3	13	7	+6	12	
7	–– Capital	6	2	0	1	3	9	7	+2	9	
8	–– Southern	6	0	0	0	6	5	27	−22	0	

Source: Hockey New Zealand

=== Goalscorers ===
There were 89 goals scored in 24 matches, for an average of 3.71 goals per match.

6 goals

- –– Rachel McCann
- –– Jodie Nichol

5 goals

- –– Gemma McCaw

4 goals

- –– Natasha FitzSimons
- –– Stacey Michelsen
- –– Brooke Neal
- –– Stephanie Dickins

3 goals

- –– Julia King
- –– Margot Willis
- –– Hope Ralph
- –– Shiloh Gloyn
- –– Elizabeth Gunson

2 goals

- –– Bridget Kiddle
- –– Jessica Chisholm
- –– Amy Lawton
- –– Emma Rainey
- –– Ashlyn McBurnie
- –– Samantha Polovnikoff
- –– Tessa Jopp
- –– Maddison McLean

1 goal

- –– Deanna Ritchie
- –– Samantha Harrison
- –– Polly Inglis
- –– Phoebe Steele
- –– Louisa Tuilotolava
- –– Pippa Hayward
- –– Emily Wium
- –– Esther Chan
- –– Charlotte Eastman
- –– Bronie Edwards
- –– Imogen Neil
- –– Lydia Velzian
- –– Tinesha Carey
- –– Clodagh McCullough
- –– Holly Pearson
- –– Kayla Whitelock
- –– Samantha Charlton
- –– Rose Keddell
- –– Kate Savory
- –– Renee Ashton
- –– Tyler Lench
- –– Stephanie Elliot
- –– Kirsten Pearce
- –– Jana Teschke
- –– Ellie Duncan

Source: Hockey New Zealand
