= Frances Davies =

New Zealand field hockey player

Personal information
- Born: 18 October 1996 (age 30) Rotorua, New Zealand
- Height: 1.77 m (5 ft 10 in)
- Weight: 68 kg (150 lb)

Sport
- Sport: Field hockey
- Position: Defender
- Club: Midlands
National team
Years	Team	Caps	Goals
–	New Zealand	130	(5)
Medal record
Representing New Zealand
Women's field hockey
Commonwealth Games
Gold medal – first place	2018 Gold Coast	Team
Oceania Cup
Gold medal – first place	2019 Rockhampton
Silver medal – second place	2017 Sydney
Silver medal – second place	2023 Whangārei

Frances Davies (18 October 1996) is a New Zealand field hockey player. She was first named to New Zealand women's national field hockey team in 2016. Her position is defender. Davies also plays for the Midlands hockey team.

== Early life and education ==
Davies was born in Rotorua, New Zealand and was raised in Tauranga, New Zealand. She began playing field hockey at age six. At nine years old she played field hockey at Tauranga Girls' College alongside her future New Zealand national teammate Amy Robinson. Frances attended St. Peter's School in Cambridge, New Zealand.

== Career ==
Davies was a member of New Zealand's field hockey team for the 2014 Summer Youth Olympic Games. After finishing her schooling, Davies moved to Auckland, New Zealand to further her field hockey career. Davies plays the position of defender. She played for New Zealand in the Under-21 Junior World Cup of field hockey. She was then named to the New Zealand women's national field hockey team, known as the Black Sticks, for a 2016 five-test series against Malaysia. Davies was again named to the Black Sticks in 2017. She was named to the Black Sticks team for the 2017 World League Final. Aside from playing for the national team, Davies is also a member of the Midlands, which as of 2017 were the national champions of New Zealand hockey.
