= Midlands (field hockey team) =

- League: Ford National Hockey League
- Founded: 2000
- Colours: Orange, Black
- Head coach: Reiner Vellinga
- Captain: Samantha Charlton

The Midlands field hockey team is an amateur sports team based in New Zealand. They field a men's team and a women's team each year in the Ford National Hockey League (NHL).

Since the tournament began, the women's team have won twice, in 2013 and 2017, and the men's team have won once, in 2016.

== NHL results ==
=== Women's ===
2000	2001	2002	2003	2004	2005	2006	2007	2008	2009	2010	2011	2012	2013	2014	2015	2016	2017	2018	2019
								3rd	2nd	3rd	3rd	4th	1st	3rd	3rd	3rd	1st	3rd	5th

=== Men's ===
2000	2001	2002	2003	2004	2005	2006	2007	2008	2009	2010	2011	2012	2013	2014	2015	2016	2017	2018	2019
												6th	4th	2nd	4th	1st	5th	6th	8th

== Team roster ==
The team has had international players, including the Dutch Fleur van Dooren and Kiki Collot d'Escury.

=== 2017 Women's ===
The following is the Midlands women's team roster for the 2017 Ford NHL:

Head coach: Reiner Vellinga

1. Sally Rutherford (GK)
2. Anita Hope (GK)
3. Frances Davies
4. Abbie Johnston
5. Kate Kernaghan
6. Shiloh Gloyn
7. Tarryn Davey
8. Ellie McCleery
9. Megan Hull
10. Gemma McCaw
11. Alex Lukin
12. Samantha Charlton (C)
13. Kate Savory
14. Kim Tanner
15. Amy Robinson
16. Rose Keddell
17. Natasha FitzSimons
18. Julia Ebert
