= Steve Edwards (field hockey) =

New Zealand field hockey player

Personal information
- Born: 25 January 1986 (age 40) Henderson, New Zealand
- Height: 1.82 m (6 ft 0 in)
- Weight: 82 kg (181 lb)

Sport
- Sport: Field hockey
- Position: Midfielder
- Club: Northern Tridents
National team
Years	Team	Caps	Goals
–	New Zealand	226	(23)
Medal record
Men's field hockey
Representing New Zealand
Commonwealth Games
Bronze medal – third place	2010 Delhi	Team

Steve Edwards (born 25 January 1986) is a New Zealand field hockey player who competed in the 2008 Summer Olympics and 2012 Summer Olympics. He currently plays for the Delhi Waveriders in the Hockey India League.

He scored a goal in the penalty shoot-out during the bronze medal match at the 2014 Commonwealth Games, but New Zealand still lost.
