= David Brydon =

New Zealand field hockey player

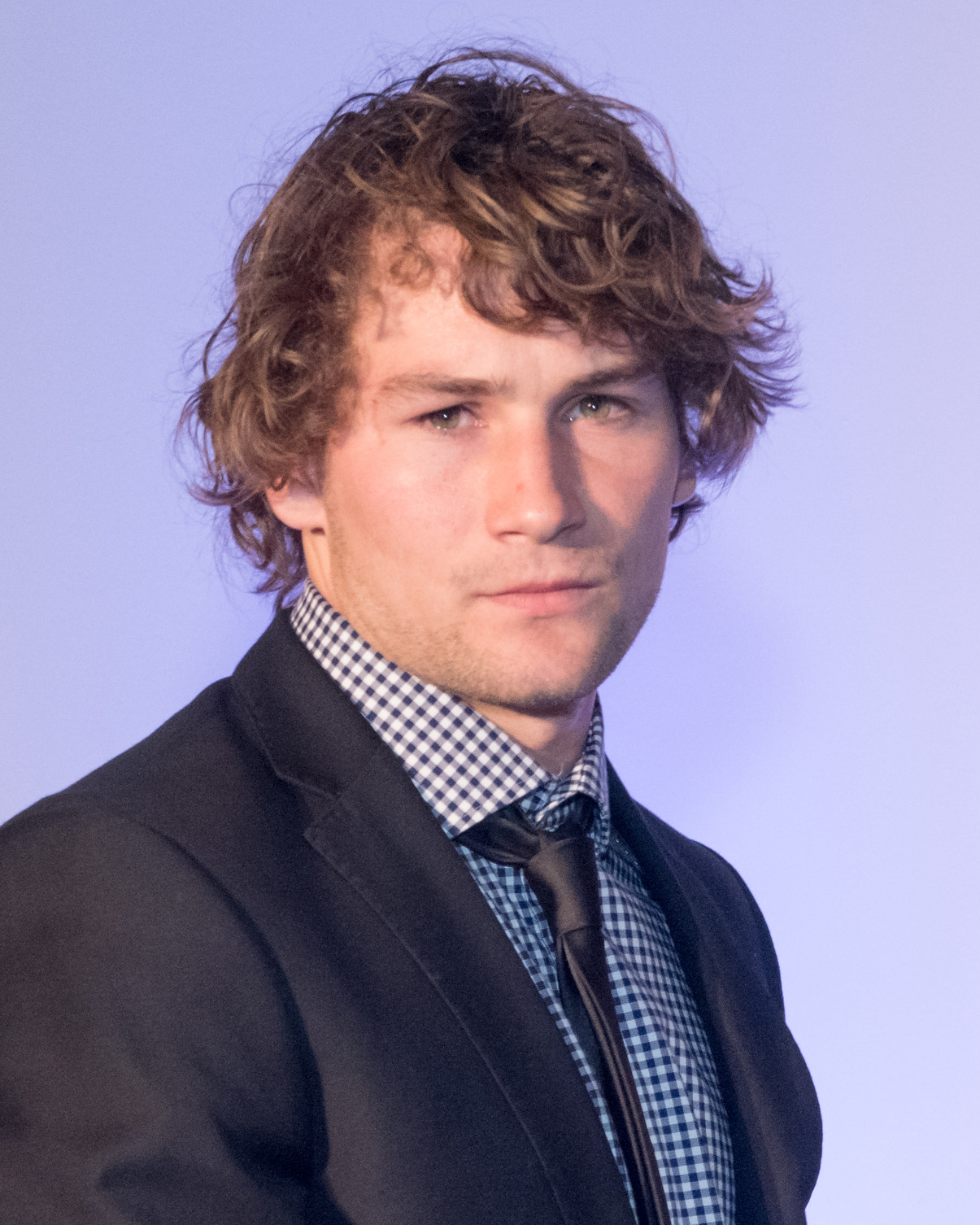
- Brydon in 2015

Personal information
- Full name: David Andrew Brydon
- Born: 27 June 1996 (age 30) Christchurch, New Zealand
- Height: 178 cm (5 ft 10 in)

Sport
- Sport: Field hockey
- Position: Defence
- Club: Southern Alpiners
Senior career
| Years | Team | Caps | Goals |
| 2015–2019 | Canterbury | 35 | 6 |
| 2020– | Southern Alpiners | 7 | 0 |
National team
| Years | Team | Caps | Goals |
| 2016 | New Zealand U–21 | 14 | (0) |
| 2016– | New Zealand | 58 | (0) |
Medal record
Men's field hockey
Representing New Zealand
Oceania Cup
| Silver medal – second place | 2017 Sydney |

David Andrew Brydon (born 27 June 1996) is a New Zealand field hockey player, who plays as a defender.

== Personal life ==
David Brydon was born in Christchurch, New Zealand. He currently lives in Auckland, New Zealand.

== Career ==
=== National teams ===
==== Under-21 ====
Brydon debuted for the New Zealand U-21 team in 2016 at the Junior Oceania Cup on the Gold Coast. Later that year he went on to represent the team at the Sultan of Johor Cup in Johor Bahru and the FIH Junior World Cup in Lucknow.

==== Black Sticks ====
Following his debut with the junior national team, David Brydon made his senior international debut with the Black Sticks in late 2016, at the Trans–Tasman Trophy in Auckland.

In 2017, Brydon won his first medal with the national team at the Oceania Cup in Sydney, winning a silver medal.

Brydon was also a member of the Black Sticks in the inaugural season of the FIH Pro League.
