= Dominic Newman =

New Zealand field hockey player

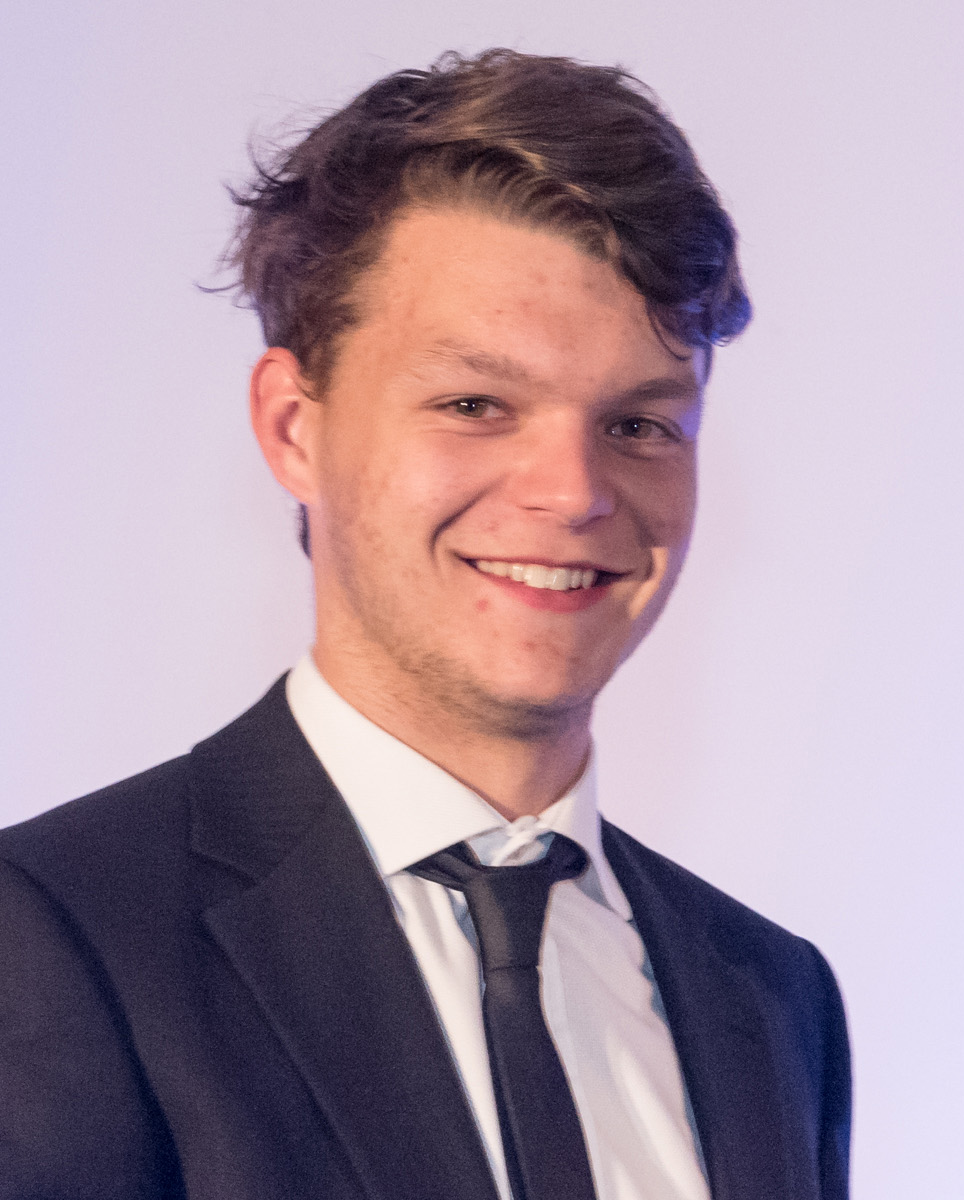
- Newman in 2015

Personal information
- Born: 7 November 1996 (age 29) Christchurch, New Zealand
- Height: 183 cm (6 ft 0 in)
- Weight: 81 kg (179 lb)

Sport
- Sport: Field hockey
- Position: Midfield
Senior career
Years	Team	Caps	Goals
2015–2019	Canterbury	31	14
2020–	Southern Alpiners	7	2
National team
Years	Team	Caps	Goals
2016	New Zealand U–21	8	(0)
2016–	New Zealand	58	(8)
Medal record
Men's field hockey
Representing New Zealand
Commonwealth Games
Silver medal – second place	2018 Gold Coast	Team

Dominic Newman (born 7 November 1996) is a field hockey player from New Zealand, who plays as a midfielder.

== Personal life ==
Dominic Newman was born and raised in Christchurch, New Zealand.

== Career ==
=== National teams ===
==== Under-21 ====
Newman debuted for the New Zealand U-21 team in 2016 at the Junior Oceania Cup held in the Gold Coast. He followed this up with an appearance at the FIH Junior World Cup in Lucknow.

==== Black Sticks ====
In 2016, Newman made his official debut for the Black Sticks during the Trans–Tasman Trophy in Auckland.

Following his debut, Newman went on to represent New Zealand throughout 2017, most notably at the Sultan Azlan Shah Cup in Ipoh.

2018 was Newman's most notable year with the national team. In April, he won a silver medal with the side at the Commonwealth Games held in the Gold Coast. He continued representing the Black Sticks in international test matches throughout the year, culminating with an appearance at the FIH World Cup in Bhubaneswar.

Newman has also appeared in the 2019 and 2020–21 editions of the FIH Pro League.

=== International goals ===
Goal	Date	Location	Opponent	Score	Result	Competition	Ref.
1	29 April 2017	Azlan Shah Stadium, Ipoh, Malaysia	Australia	1–1	1–1	2017 Sultan Azlan Shah Cup	
2	5 May 2017	Azlan Shah Stadium, Ipoh, Malaysia	Great Britain	1–1	2–3	2017 Sultan Azlan Shah Cup	
3	21 January 2018	Blake Park, Tauranga, New Zealand	Japan	3–1	5–4	Test Match	
4	8 July 2018	Ibuki Stadium, Maibara, Japan	Japan	1–0	3–3	Test Match	
5	14 July 2018	Kawasaki Juko Stadium, Kakamigahara, Japan	Germany	3–7	4–7	Test Match	
6	17 October 2018	Lloyd Elsmore Hockey Stadium, Auckland, New Zealand	Canada	1–0	3–0	Test Match	
7	21 October 2018	Lloyd Elsmore Hockey Stadium, Auckland, New Zealand	Canada	1–0	2–3	Test Match	
8	28 February 2020	Ngā Puna Wai Sports Hub, Christchurch, New Zealand	Argentina	5–3	5–3	2020–21 FIH Pro League	
