= Louisa Tuilotolava =

Field hockey player

Personal information
- Born: 30 June 1996 (age 30)

Sport
- Sport: Field hockey
- Position: Midfielder
- Club: Auckland
National team
| Years | Team | Caps | Goals |
| – | New Zealand | | - |

Louisa Tuilotolava (born 30 June 1996) is a New Zealand field hockey player for the New Zealand national team.

She participated at the 2018 Women's Hockey World Cup.
