= Cory Bennett =

New Zealand field hockey player

Personal information
- Born: 12 July 1991 (age 35) North Shore, New Zealand
- Height: 188 cm (6 ft 2 in)
- Weight: 84 kg (185 lb)

Sport
- Sport: Field hockey
- Position: Defender
National team
Years	Team	Caps	Goals
2013–2020	New Zealand	110	(14)
Medal record
Men's field hockey
Representing New Zealand
Commonwealth Games
Silver medal – second place	2018 Gold Coast	Team
Oceania Cup
Silver medal – second place	2013 Stratford
Silver medal – second place	2017 Sydney
Silver medal – second place	2019 Rockhampton

Cory Bennett (born 12 July 1991) is a former field hockey player from New Zealand.

== Personal life ==
Cory Bennett was born and raised in North Shore, New Zealand. He currently works as an insurance broker in Auckland.

== Career ==
=== Club hockey ===
In the New Zealand National Hockey League, Bennett plays hockey for North Harbour.

=== National team ===
Cory Bennett made his debut for the Black Sticks in 2013, at the Sultan Azalan Shah Cup, in Ipoh, Malaysia.

Since his debut, Bennett has been a regular inclusion in the Black Sticks side. During his career, he has medalled three times, winning silver at the 2018 Commonwealth Games and the 2013 and 2017 Oceania Cups.

His most recent appearance for the national team was during the inaugural tournament of the FIH Pro League, where New Zealand finished in last place.

On 5 August 2019, Bennett was named in the Black Sticks squad for the Ready Steady Tokyo Olympic test event in Tokyo, Japan. In December 2020, he announced his retirement from the national team.
