= George Muir (field hockey) =

New Zealand field hockey player

Personal information
- Full name: George David Muir
- Born: 24 February 1994 (age 32) North Shore, New Zealand
- Height: 171 cm (5 ft 7 in)
- Weight: 72 kg (159 lb)

Sport
- Sport: Field hockey
- Position: Midfielder
- Club: North Harbour
National team
Years	Team	Caps	Goals
2012–2014	New Zealand U–21	17	(0)
2013–	New Zealand	146	(18)
Medal record
Men's field hockey
Representing New Zealand
Commonwealth Games
Silver medal – second place	2018 Gold Coast	Team
Oceania Cup
Silver medal – second place	2015 Stratford
Silver medal – second place	2017 Sydney
Silver medal – second place	2019 Rockhampton

George David Muir (born 24 February 1994) is a New Zealand field hockey player.

== Personal life ==
George Muir was born and raised on the North Shore, New Zealand.

Muir works as a lawyer at Thompson Blackie Biddles in Auckland.

== Career ==
=== Domestic competition ===
In the New Zealand National Hockey League, Muir plays for North Harbour.

=== National teams ===
==== Under-21 ====
Muir appeared in the New Zealand U-21 side on two occasions; at the 2012 Sultan of Johor Cup and the 2013 FIH Junior World Cup.

==== Black Sticks ====
In 2013, Muir made his senior international debut for the Black Sticks during the 2012–13 FIH World League Semi-Finals in Rotterdam.

Muir's most prominent appearance with the national team was at the 2018 Commonwealth Games on the Gold Coast, where the team won a silver medal.

During the inaugural tournament of the FIH Pro League, Muir was a member of the New Zealand team that finished in 8th place.
