= Auckland (field hockey team) =

- League: Ford National Hockey League
- Founded: 2000
- Colours: Navy, White
- Head coach: Jude Menezes
- Captain: Julia King

The Auckland women's field hockey team are an amateur sports team based in Auckland, New Zealand. The team competes annually in the Ford National Hockey League (NHL).

Auckland are the most successful team in the Women's NHL, having won the championship a total of 5 times.

== Team roster ==
The following is the Auckland team roster for the 2017 Ford NHL:

Head coach: Jude Menezes

1. Amelia Gibson (GK)
2. Samantha Harrison
4. Danielle Jones
5. Katie Doar
6. Belinda Smith
7. Madison Doar
8. Maddison Dowe
9. Polly Inglis
10. Phoebe Steele
11. Beckie Middleton
12. Julia King (C)
13. Deanna Ritchie
14. Ali Hunt
15. Lulu Tuilotolava
16. Amelia Marlow
17. Victoria Methven
18. Sophia Howard (GK)
19. Tayla White
