= Central (field hockey team) =

- League: Ford National Hockey League
- Founded: 2000
- Colours: Green, Yellow
- Head coach: Henry Wong
- Captain: Kayla Whitelock

The Central women's field hockey team are an amateur sports team based in New Zealand. The team competes annually in the Ford National Hockey League (NHL).

Central have won the NHL a total of 2 times, most recently in 2009.

== Team roster ==
The following is the Central team roster for the 2017 Ford NHL:

Head coaches: Henry Wong

1. Georgia Barnett (GK)
3. Emily Gaddum
4. Hope Ralph
5. Emma Rainey
6. Michaela Curtis
7. Kayla Whitelock (C)
8. Casey-Mae Waddell
10. Verity Sharland
11. Holly Pearson
12. Hannah Williamson
13. Sheree Horvath
15. Beth Norman
16. Pippa Norman
18. Megan Phillips
19. Tegan Muraahi (GK)
21. Kelsey MacDonald
22. Tinesha Carey
23. Clodagh McCullough
