= Canterbury (field hockey team) =

Ice hockey team in New Zealand

- League: Ford National Hockey League
- Founded: 2000
- Colours: Red, Black
- Head coach: Sue Innes; Andy Innes
- Captain: Jenny Storey

The Canterbury women's field hockey team are an amateur sports team based in New Zealand. The team competes annually in the Ford National Hockey League (NHL).

== History ==
In total, Canterbury have won the Women's NHL a total of 3 times.

Canterbury are the most recent champions, having defeated North Harbour 3–2 in the final of the 2016 Tournament.

== Team roster ==
The following is the Canterbury team roster for the 2017 Ford NHL:

Head coaches: Sue & Andy Innes

1. Jessie Anderson
2. Margot Willis
3. Libby Bird
6. Jordy Grant
7. Sophie Cocks
8. Georgie Mackay-Stewart
9. Jenny Storey (C)
10. Pippa Hayward
11. Rachel McCann
12. Leah butt
13. Emily Wium
14. Charlotte Symes
15. Kirsty Nation (GK)
16. Iona Young (GK)
18. Bridget Kiddle
19. Sian Fremaux
20. Millie Calder
21. Sarah Rutherford
