= North Harbour (field hockey team) =

- League: Ford National Hockey League
- Founded: 2000
- Home arena: North Harbour Hockey Stadium
- Colours: Maroon, White
- Head coach: Sam Bartholomew

The North Harbour women's field hockey team are an amateur sports team based in New Zealand. The team competes annually in the Ford National Hockey League (NHL).

North Harbour have won the Women's NHL a total of 5 times, last winning the championship in 2019.

== Team roster ==
The following is the North Harbour team roster for the 2019 Ford NHL:

=== Team Staff ===
Head coach: Sam Bartholomew

Assistant coaches: Elliot Bartholomew and Henry Wong

Team manager: Rachel Williams

Team physiotherapist: Tracey Lydiard

=== Team List ===
1. Brooke Roberts (GK)
3. Tori Robinson
4. Julia Gomes
5. Kate Ivory
6. Erin Goad
7. Mattea Harris
8. Ella Hyatt-Brown
10. Josephine Ackroyd
11. Kathryn Henry
12. Claudia Hanham
13. Samantha Polovnikoff
14. Sophie Rider
15. Lucia Sanguinetti
17. Summer Notredame
18. Kirsten Pearce
19. Cassandra Reid
20. Stephanie Dickins
22. Hattie Jones
32. Madeleine Forbes (GK)
