= Hockey at the 2018 Commonwealth Games – Women's team squads =

This article lists the squads of the women's hockey competition at the 2018 Commonwealth Games held in Gold Coast, Australia from 5 to 14 April 2018.

== Pool A ==
=== England ===
The squad was announced on 15 March 2018.

Head coach: Daniel Kerry

1. Madeleine Hinch (GK)
3. Kathryn Lane
4. Laura Unsworth
5. Sarah Haycroft
6. Anna Toman
7. Hannah Martin
9. Susannah Townsend
11. Suzannah Petty
13. Elena Rayer
15. Alexandra Danson (C)
16. Emily Defroand
18. Giselle Ansley
19. Sophie Bray
20. Hollie Pearne-Webb
21. Eloise Watton
23. Amy Tennant (GK)
27. Joanne Hunter
31. Grace Balsdon

=== India ===
The squad was announced on 14 March 2018.

Head coach: Harendra Singh

1. Navjot Kaur
2. Gurjit Kaur
3. Deep Grace Ekka
4. Monika Malik
8. Nikki Pradhan
11. Savita Punia (GK)
13. Rajani Etimarpu (GK)
15. Poonam Rani
16. Vandana Katariya
17. Deepika Thakur
19. Namita Toppo
20. Lalremsiami
25. Navneet Kaur
26. Sunita Lakra
27. Sushila Chanu
28. Rani Rampal (C)
31. Lilima Minz
32. Neha Goyal

=== Malaysia ===
Head coach: Dharma Raj Kanniah

1. Farah Yahya (GK)
2. Nuraini Rashid
3. Nuraslinda Said
4. Nurul Mansur
6. Norsharina Shabuddin
7. Siti Ruhani (C)
8. Juliani Din
9. Norbaini Hashim
11. Norazlin Sumantri
12. Hanis Onn
13. Surizan Awang
15. Syafiqah Zain
16. Huzaimah Aziz (GK)
17. Siti Othman
19. Fazilla Sylvester
20. Norfaiezah Saiuti
21. Fatin Sukri
26. Nuramirah Zulkifli

=== South Africa ===
The squad was announced on 30 January 2018.

Head coach: Sheldon Rostron

3. Celia Evans
4. Nicole Walraven
7. Illse Davids
8. Kristen Paton
10. Shelley Jones
11. Kara-Lee Botes
12. Dirkie Chamberlain
13. Lisa-Marié Deetlefs
16. Erin Hunter
17. Candice Manuel
20. Nicolene Terblanche
21. Ongeziwe Mali
22. Stephanie Baxter
24. Phumelela Mbande (GK)
25. Nicole la Fleur (GK)
27. Jade Mayne
28. Quanita Bobbs
30. Sulette Damons (C)

=== Wales ===
The squad was announced on 1 March 2018.

Head coach: Kevin Johnson

1. Roseanne Thomas (GK)
2. Julie Whiting
5. Natasha Marke-Jones
6. Sophie Clayton
7. Sian French
8. Sarah Jones
9. Lisa Daley
10. Phoebe Richards
12. Tina Evans
14. Eloise Laity
15. Elisabeth Bingham
17. Leah Wilkinson (C)
18. Isabelle Howell
19. Delyth Thomas
21. Xenna Hughes
22. Ella Jackson (GK)
27. Joanne Westwood
32. Charlotte Hulme

== Pool B ==
=== Australia ===
The squad was announced on 16 March 2018.

Head coach: Paul Gaudoin

1. Gabrielle Nance
3. Brooke Peris
4. Emily Hurtz
7. Jodie Kenny
11. Karri McMahon
13. Edwina Bone
14. Stephanie Kershaw
15. Kaitlin Nobbs
16. Jordyn Holzberger
18. Jane Claxton
19. Jocelyn Bartram (GK)
21. Renee Taylor
22. Madeleine Ratcliffe
25. Ashlea Fey
26. Emily Smith (C)
27. Rachael Lynch (GK)
30. Grace Stewart
32. Savannah Fitzpatrick

=== Canada ===
The squad was announced on 18 March 2018.

Head coach: (South Africa) Giles Bonnet

1. Kaitlyn Williams (GK)
2. Natalie Sourisseau
3. Katherine Wright (C)
4. Lauren Logush (GK)
5. Alison Lee
9. Danielle Hennig
10. Kathleen Leahy
11. Rachel Donohoe
13. Hannah Haughn
14. Karli Johansen
17. Sara McManus
20. Nicole Woodcroft
21. Amanda Woodcroft
22. Madeline Secco
23. Brienne Stairs
24. Caashia Karringten
25. Shanlee Johnston
26. Stephanie Norlander

=== Ghana ===
Head coach: Emmanuel Ahadjie

1. Bridget Azumah (GK)
2. Janet Adampa
3. Serwaa Boakye
4. Ernestina Coffie
5. Emelia Fosuaa
6. Nafisatu Umaru (C)
7. Adizatu Sulemana
8. Cecilia Amoako
9. Debora Whyte
10. Elizabeth Opoku
11. Lydia Afriyie
12. Martha Sarfoa
13. Juwaila Acquah
14. Mavis Berko
16. Bennedicta Adjei
17. Vivian Narkour
18. Mavis Ampem-Darkoa (GK)
21. Roberta Sarfo

=== New Zealand ===
The squad was announced on 12 March 2018.

Head coach: (Australia) Mark Hager

1. Tarryn Davey
2. Samantha Harrison
4. Olivia Merry
5. Frances Davies
6. Amy Robinson
8. Sally Rutherford (GK)
9. Brooke Neal
12. Elizabeth Gunson
13. Samantha Charlton
15. Grace O'Hanlon (GK)
16. Elizabeth Thompson
24. Rose Keddell
25. Kelsey Smith
26. Pippa Hayward
28. Shiloh Gloyn
29. Madison Doar
31. Stacey Michelsen (C)
32. Anita McLaren

=== Scotland ===
The squad was announced on 14 February 2018.

Head coach: Gordon Shepherd

2. Nicola Cochrane (GK)
4. Mairi Drummond
6. Rebecca Ward (C)
7. Amy Brodie
8. Amy Costello
9. Katie Robertson
10. Sarah Robertson
12. Charlotte Watson
14. Kareena Cuthbert (C)
17. Sarah Jamieson
19. Nicola Alexander-Lloyd
20. Camilla Brown
21. Alison Howie
22. Nicola Skrastin
26. Robyn Collins
26. Rebecca Condie
27. Amy Gibson (GK)
28. Lucy Lanigan

== See also ==
- Hockey at the 2018 Commonwealth Games – Men's team squads
