= New Zealand women's national field hockey team results (2016–2020) =

Results of the Black Sticks from 2016 until 2020

The following article comprises the results of the Black Sticks, the women's national field hockey team from New Zealand, from 2016 until 2020. New fixtures can be found on the International Hockey Federation's results portal.

== Match results ==
=== 2016 Results ===
Statistics	Pld	W	D	L	GF	GA	GD	Pts
New Zealand	41	24	4	13	94	65	+29	76

Source: FIH

==== Argentina Test Series ====
23 February 2016 Test Match	Argentina	2–2	New Zealand	Mar del Plata, Argentina
19:00	Barrionuevo 13'; Von der Heyde 43'	Report	Merry 10'; Whitelock 29'	Stadium: Mar del Plata Club

25 February 2016 Test Match	Argentina	1–0	New Zealand	Mar del Plata, Argentina
19:00	Rebecchi 47'	Report		Stadium: Mar del Plata Club

27 February 2016 Test Match	Argentina	2–3	New Zealand	Mar del Plata, Argentina
19:00	Merino 34'; Granatto 45'	Report	Cocks 7'; Webster 38'; Pearce 60'	Stadium: Mar del Plata Club

28 February 2016 Test Match	Argentina	1–4	New Zealand	Mar del Plata, Argentina
19:00	Merino 49'	Report	Michelsen 26'; Neal 34'; Webster 37'; Flynn 52'	Stadium: Mar del Plata Club

1 March 2016 Test Match	Argentina	2–1	New Zealand	Mar del Plata, Argentina
19:00	Von der Heyde 28'; Habif 58'	Report	Merry 42'	Stadium: Mar del Plata Club

3 March 2016 Test Match	Argentina	2–2	New Zealand	Mar del Plata, Argentina
19:00	Jankunas 2'; Barrionuevo 7'	Report	Pearce 56'; Whitelock 59'	Stadium: Mar del Plata Club

==== Canada Test Series ====
27 March 2016 Test Match	New Zealand	6–0	Canada	Hamilton, New Zealand
15:00	Merry 23', 54'; Harrison 29', 50'; Thompson 32'; Whitelock 43'	Report		Stadium: Gallagher Hockey Centre

28 March 2016 Test Match	New Zealand	5–1	Canada	Hamilton, New Zealand
15:00	Harrison 10', 39'; Whitelock 14'; Flynn 28'; Grant 32'	Report	Culley 18'	Stadium: Gallagher Hockey Centre

==== III Hawke's Bay Cup ====
2 April 2016 Group Stage	New Zealand	1–0	India	Hastings, New Zealand
15:00	Merry 16'	Report		Stadium: Hawke's Bay Sports Park

3 April 2016 Group Stage	China	1–3	New Zealand	Hastings, New Zealand
15:00	Zhang X. 12'	Report	Flynn 16', 47'; Cocks 42'	Stadium: Hawke's Bay Sports Park

5 April 2016 Group Stage	New Zealand	3–1	Ireland	Hastings, New Zealand
18:00	Punt 32'; Michelsen 52'; Harrison 54'	Report	Evans 9'	Stadium: Hawke's Bay Sports Park

7 April 2016 Quarter-Finals	New Zealand	6–0	South Korea	Hastings, New Zealand
16:45	Merry 9'; Cocks 19'; Punt 21', 60'; Charlton 47'; Hayward 60'	Report		Stadium: Hawke's Bay Sports Park

9 April 2016 Semi-Finals	New Zealand	3–2	Australia	Hastings, New Zealand
18:15	Harrison 24'; Merry 30'; Hayward 45'	Report	Slattery 14', 22'	Stadium: Hawke's Bay Sports Park

10 April 2016 Final	Japan	2–3	New Zealand	Hastings, New Zealand
17:15	Nakagawa 55'; Nakashima 60'	Report	Merry 4'; Flynn 9'; Whitelock 33'	Stadium: Hawke's Bay Sports Park

==== International Hockey Open ====
31 May 2016 Group Stage	New Zealand	4–1	India	Darwin, Australia
17:00	Hayward 18', 47'; McLaren 51'; Webster 53'	Report	Thokchom 58'	Stadium: Marrara Hockey Centre

1 June 2016 Group Stage	New Zealand	1–2	India	Darwin, Australia
19:00	Merry 21'	Report	Morgan 38'; Smith 46'	Stadium: Marrara Hockey Centre

3 June 2016 Group Stage	Japan	1–2	New Zealand	Darwin, Australia
17:00	Sakaguchi 58'	Report	Smith 28'; Webster 34'	Stadium: Marrara Hockey Centre

4 June 2016 Final	Australia	0–2	New Zealand	Darwin, Australia
19:30		Report	Smith 24'; Merry 30'	Stadium: Marrara Hockey Centre

==== Netherlands Test Match ====
14 June 2016 Test Match	Netherlands	2–0	New Zealand	Berkel en Rodenrijs, Netherlands
15:00	Paumen 28'; Jonker 51'	Report		Stadium: HC Berkel en Rodenrijs

==== XXII Champions Trophy ====
18 June 2016 Group Stage	Netherlands	6–2	New Zealand	London, Great Britain
16:00	Paumen 11', 24', 49', 58'; Jonker 40', 55'	Report	Harrison 29'; Michelsen 36'	Stadium: Lee Valley Hockey and Tennis Centre

19 June 2016 Group Stage	Australia	3–1	New Zealand	London, Great Britain
16:00	Smith 3'; Kenny 18'; Stewart 40'	Report	McLaren 3'	Stadium: Lee Valley Hockey and Tennis Centre

21 June 2016 Group Stage	New Zealand	1–0	Great Britain	London, Great Britain
20:00	Michelsen 1'	Report		Stadium: Lee Valley Hockey and Tennis Centre

23 June 2016 Group Stage	Argentina	4–2	New Zealand	London, Great Britain
14:30	F. Habif 10'; Rebecchi 23', 33'; Granatto 47'	Report	Cocks 37'; Merry 56'	Stadium: Lee Valley Hockey and Tennis Centre

25 June 2016 Group Stage	New Zealand	1–1	United States	London, Great Britain
14:00	Merry 36'	Report	Kolojejchick 10'	Stadium: Lee Valley Hockey and Tennis Centre

26 June 2016 Fifth Place Match	New Zealand	3–4	Great Britain	London, Great Britain
14:00	McLaren 22'; Merry 39'; Smith 47'	Report	Danson 10', 33', 52'; Owsley 26'	Stadium: Lee Valley Hockey and Tennis Centre

==== Games of the XXXI Olympiad ====
7 August 2016 Group Stage	New Zealand	4–1	South Korea	Rio de Janeiro, Brazil
10:00	Pearce 10'; Harrison 19'; Flynn 21'; Webster 34'	Report	Kim H. 55'	Stadium: Olympic Hockey Centre

8 August 2016 Group Stage	New Zealand	1–2	Germany	Rio de Janeiro, Brazil
13:30	Webster 10'	Report	Oldhafer 22'; Schröder 44'	Stadium: Olympic Hockey Centre

10 August 2016 Group Stage	Spain	1–2	New Zealand	Rio de Janeiro, Brazil
10:00	Petchamé 60'	Report	Smith 22', 51'	Stadium: Olympic Hockey Centre

12 August 2016 Group Stage	New Zealand	1–1	Netherlands	Rio de Janeiro, Brazil
11:00	Whitelock 59'	Report	Paumen 28'	Stadium: Olympic Hockey Centre

13 August 2016 Group Stage	China	0–3	New Zealand	Rio de Janeiro, Brazil
20:30		Report	Merry 21'; Flynn 41'; McLaren 42'	Stadium: Olympic Hockey Centre

15 August 2016 Quarter-Finals	New Zealand	4–2	Australia	Rio de Janeiro, Brazil
10:00	McLaren 7'; Smith 24'; Flynn 39'; Merry 44'	Report	Slattery 33', 59'	Stadium: Olympic Hockey Centre

17 August 2016 Semi-Finals	New Zealand	0–3	Great Britain	Rio de Janeiro, Brazil
17:00		Report	Danson 22', 52'; H. Richardson-Walsh 48'	Stadium: Olympic Hockey Centre

19 August 2016 Bronze Medal Match	Germany	2–1	New Zealand	Rio de Janeiro, Brazil
12:00	Stapenhorst 34'; Schütze 38'	Report	Merry 45+'	Stadium: Olympic Hockey Centre

==== Trans–Tasman Trophy ====
17 November 2016 Match 1	New Zealand	0–6	Australia	Auckland, New Zealand
18:30		Report	Commerford 17'; Slattery 33', 55'; Morgan 40'; Nanscawen 44'; Fey 48'	Stadium: Lloyd Elsmore Hockey Stadium

19 November 2016 Match 2	New Zealand	2–0	Australia	Auckland, New Zealand
20:00	Merry 24'; McCann 27'	Report		Stadium: Lloyd Elsmore Hockey Stadium

20 November 2016 Match 3	New Zealand	3–2	Australia	Auckland, New Zealand
18:00	Pearce 3'; Harrison 19'; Merry 48'	Report	Morgan 32'; Peris 54'	Stadium: Lloyd Elsmore Hockey Stadium

==== Malaysia Test Series ====
12 December 2016 Test Match	New Zealand	3–0	Malaysia	Auckland, New Zealand
18:30	Harrison 6'; Curtis 15'; Robinson 18'	Report		Stadium: Lloyd Elsmore Hockey Stadium

13 December 2016 Test Match	New Zealand	2–0	Malaysia	Auckland, New Zealand
18:30	Curtis 3'; Tinning 43'	Report		Stadium: Lloyd Elsmore Hockey Stadium

15 December 2016 Test Match	New Zealand	0–1	Malaysia	Auckland, New Zealand
18:30		Report	Fatin 57'	Stadium: Lloyd Elsmore Hockey Stadium

17 December 2016 Test Match	New Zealand	5–2	Malaysia	Auckland, New Zealand
15:00	Steele 7'; Pearce 12'; McCann 20'; Harrison 41'; Curtis 42'	Report	Surizan 33'; Nuraini 51'	Stadium: Lloyd Elsmore Hockey Stadium

18 December 2016 Test Match	New Zealand	2–1	Malaysia	Auckland, New Zealand
13:00	Harrison 8', 24'	Report	Nuraini 50'	Stadium: Lloyd Elsmore Hockey Stadium

=== 2017 Results ===
Statistics	Pld	W	D	L	GF	GA	GD	Pts
New Zealand	39	19	6	14	97	60	+37	63

Source: FIH

==== Argentina Test Series ====
13 February 2017 Test Match	Argentina	3–0	New Zealand	Buenos Aires, Argentina
18:00	Granatto 1'; Campoy 29', 58'	Report		Stadium: CeNARD

14 February 2017 Test Match	Argentina	0–1	New Zealand	Buenos Aires, Argentina
18:00		Report	Merry 45+'	Stadium: CeNARD

16 February 2017 Test Match	Argentina	3–0	New Zealand	Buenos Aires, Argentina
18:00	Granatto 4'; Trinchinetti 20'; Merino 37'	Report		Stadium: CeNARD

17 February 2017 Test Match	Argentina	2–2	New Zealand	Buenos Aires, Argentina
18:00	Trinchinetti 26'; Granatto 58'	Report	Grant 4'; Merry 13'	Stadium: CeNARD

19 February 2017 Test Match	Argentina	2–0	New Zealand	Buenos Aires, Argentina
18:00	Granatto 44'; Rebecchi 45'	Report		Stadium: CeNARD

==== United States Test Series ====
25 March 2017 Test Match	New Zealand	2–6	United States	Christchurch, New Zealand
15:00	Pearce 7'; Tanner 23'	Report	Hoffman 10'; Vittese 26'; Van Sickle 33'; Witmer 42'; Shealy 48'; Sharkey 52'	Stadium: Waimakariri Hockey Stadium

26 March 2017 Test Match	New Zealand	3–2	United States	Christchurch, New Zealand
15:00	Merry 23'; Thompson 24'; Michelsen 47'	Report	Sharkey 4'; Parker 14'	Stadium: Waimakariri Hockey Stadium

==== IV Hawke's Bay Cup ====
31 March 2017 Group Stage	New Zealand	1–2	Japan	Hastings, New Zealand
18:00	Neal 54'	Report	Kawamura 8'; Asai 58'	Stadium: Hawke's Bay Sports Park

1 April 2017 Group Stage	Australia	1–1	New Zealand	Hastings, New Zealand
17:00	Barden 9'	Report	Harrison 59'	Stadium: Hawke's Bay Sports Park

3 April 2017 Group Stage	New Zealand	3–2	United States	Hastings, New Zealand
18:00	Robinson 12'; Harrison 25'; Smith 35'	Report	Matson 11'; Hoffman 47'	Stadium: Hawke's Bay Sports Park

4 April 2017 Group Stage	New Zealand	1–0	Japan	Hastings, New Zealand
18:00	Pearce 20'	Report		Stadium: Hawke's Bay Sports Park

6 April 2017 Group Stage	Australia	1–1	New Zealand	Hastings, New Zealand
17:30	Ratcliffe 29'	Report	Harrison 51'	Stadium: Hawke's Bay Sports Park

8 April 2017 Group Stage	New Zealand	2–1	United States	Hastings, New Zealand
17:00	Pearce 23'; Neal 28'	Report	Van Sickle 3'	Stadium: Hawke's Bay Sports Park

9 April 2017 Final	New Zealand	3–0	Japan	Hastings, New Zealand
17:00	McCann 5'; Keddell 57'; Merry 57'	Report		Stadium: Hawke's Bay Sports Park

==== India Test Series ====
14 May 2017 Test Match	New Zealand	4–1	India	Pukekohe, New Zealand
15:00	Grant 13'; Merry 23'; McCann 43'; Ritchie 55'	Report	Anupa 31'	Stadium: Rosa Birch Park

16 May 2017 Test Match	New Zealand	8–2	India	Pukekohe, New Zealand
19:00	Harrison 3', 56'; Michelsen 21', 30', 42'; Pearce 52'; Doar 56'; Dickins 60'	Report	Lilima 40'; Anupa 49'	Stadium: Rosa Birch Park

17 May 2017 Test Match	New Zealand	3–2	India	Pukekohe, New Zealand
19:00	Gunson 13'; Ritchie 15'; Gloyn 39'	Report	Grace 9'; Monika 59'	Stadium: Rosa Birch Park

19 May 2017 Test Match	New Zealand	3–0	India	Hastings, New Zealand
14:00	McCann 14', 26'; Jopp 17'	Report		Stadium: Gallagher Sports Centre

20 May 2017 Test Match	New Zealand	6–2	India	Hastings, New Zealand
14:00	Merry 4', 15'; Hayward 27'; FitzSimons 37'; Harrison 38'; Pearce 40'	Report	Grace 22'; Rani 33'	Stadium: Gallagher Sports Centre

==== Spain Test Series ====
10 June 2017 Test Match	Spain	2–1	New Zealand	Terrassa, Spain
18:15	Iglesias 15'; Bonastre 19'	Report	Pearce 20'	Stadium: Atlètic Terrassa Hockey Club

11 June 2017 Test Match	Spain	1–1	New Zealand	Terrassa, Spain
20:00	Pons 15'	Report	Harrison 25'	Stadium: Atlètic Terrassa Hockey Club

13 June 2017 Test Match	Spain	3–1	New Zealand	Terrassa, Spain
20:00	Riera 23'; López 27'; Iglesias 35'	Report	Smith 10'	Stadium: Atlètic Terrassa Hockey Club

14 June 2017 Test Match	Spain	3–3	New Zealand	Terrassa, Spain
19:30	Pérez 18'; Ybarra 36'; Salvatella 51'	Report	Pearce 10'; Grant 37'; Hayward 43'	Stadium: Atlètic Terrassa Hockey Club

==== FIH World League Semifinals ====
21 June 2017 Group Stage	New Zealand	1–0	Spain	Brussels, Belgium
20:00	Merry 19'	Report		Stadium: Stade Fallon

24 June 2017 Group Stage	New Zealand	2–0	Australia	Brussels, Belgium
14:00	Neal 15', 57'	Report		Stadium: Stade Fallon

25 June 2017 Group Stage	Belgium	1–0	New Zealand	Brussels, Belgium
16:00	Raes 44'	Report		Stadium: Stade Fallon

27 June 2017 Group Stage	New Zealand	1–0	Malaysia	Brussels, Belgium
16:00	Merry 5'	Report		Stadium: Stade Fallon

29 June 2017 Quarter-Finals	New Zealand	2–0	Italy	Brussels, Belgium
13:15	Harrison 6'; Charlton 35'	Report		Stadium: Stade Fallon

1 July 2017 Semi-Finals	Netherlands	1–1 (5–4 p)	New Zealand	Brussels, Belgium
18:00	Van Maasakker 49'	Report	Pearce 34'	Stadium: Stade Fallon
	Penalties
	De Waard (penalty shoot-out missed); Sanders (penalty shoot-out scored); Matla (penalty shoot-out missed); Leurink (penalty shoot-out scored); Van Geffen (penalty shoot-out scored); Matla (penalty shoot-out missed); Sanders (penalty shoot-out scored); Leurink (penalty shoot-out missed); Van Geffen (penalty shoot-out scored)		(penalty shoot-out scored) Charlton; (penalty shoot-out scored) Merry; (penalty shoot-out missed) Michelsen; (penalty shoot-out missed) Gunson; (penalty shoot-out scored) Thompson; (penalty shoot-out missed) Charlton; (penalty shoot-out scored) Thompson; (penalty shoot-out missed) Merry; (penalty shoot-out missed) Gunson

2 July 2017 Third Place Match	New Zealand	1–0	South Korea	Brussels, Belgium
15:45	Neal 54'	Report		Stadium: Stade Fallon

==== X Oceania Cup ====
11 October 2017 Group Stage	Papua New Guinea	0–33	New Zealand	Sydney, Australia
18:00		Report	Harrison 3', 4', 6', 14', 21', 28', 36', 38', 53'; Robinson 7'; McCann 10', 17', 19', 23', 24', 25', 31'; Merry 14', 23', 33', 35', 39', 58', 60'; Keddell 24'; Fitzsimons 27'; Gloyn 28', 52', 57'; Thompson 29', 30'; Tanner 53'; Charlton 55'	Stadium: Sydney Olympic Park

14 October 2017 Group Stage	New Zealand	1–2	Australia	Sydney, Australia
17:00	Merry 53'	Report	Fitzpatrick 12'; Peris 22'	Stadium: Sydney Olympic Park

15 October 2017 Final	Australia	2–0	New Zealand	Sydney, Australia
15:00	Claxton 3'; Bates 30'	Report		Stadium: Sydney Olympic Park

==== FIH World League Final ====
17 November 2017 Group Stage	Netherlands	4–0	New Zealand	Auckland, New Zealand
20:00	Jonker 11', 48'; Krekelaar 15'; Matla 39'	Report		Stadium: North Harbour Hockey Stadium

18 November 2017 Group Stage	New Zealand	1–2	South Korea	Auckland, New Zealand
18:00	Goad 26'	Report	Cho H. 51'; Park S. 53'	Stadium: North Harbour Hockey Stadium

20 November 2017 Group Stage	New Zealand	1–3	United States	Auckland, New Zealand
20:00	Gunson 22'	Report	Witmer 9'; West 37', 45'	Stadium: North Harbour Hockey Stadium

22 November 2017 Quarter-Finals	Argentina	1–2	New Zealand	Auckland, New Zealand
20:15	Merino 2'	Report	Neal 32'; Michelsen 33'	Stadium: North Harbour Hockey Stadium

24 November 2017 Semi-Finals	England	0–1	New Zealand	Auckland, New Zealand
20:15		Report	Merry 55'	Stadium: North Harbour Hockey Stadium

26 November 2017 Semi-Finals	Netherlands	3–0	New Zealand	Auckland, New Zealand
20:15	Jonker 24'; Verschoor 25'; Leurink 32'	Report		Stadium: North Harbour Hockey Stadium

=== 2018 Results ===
Statistics	Pld	W	D	L	GF	GA	GD	Pts
New Zealand	24	7	5	12	49	50	−1	26

Source: FIH

==== Argentina Test Series ====
20 February 2018 Test Match	Argentina	4–0	New Zealand	Buenos Aires, Argentina
18:00	Granatto 35'; Merino 45'; Jankunas 50'; Barrionuevo 56'	Report		Stadium: Club Ciudad de Buenos Aires

22 February 2018 Test Match	Argentina	3–1	New Zealand	Buenos Aires, Argentina
18:30	Trinchinetti 14'; Jardel 22'; Jankunas 53'	Report	McLaren 25'	Stadium: Club Ciudad de Buenos Aires

24 February 2018 Test Match	Argentina	2–3	New Zealand	Buenos Aires, Argentina
18:00	Jankunas 7', 11'	Report	Gloyn 2', 38'; McLaren 60'	Stadium: Club Ciudad de Buenos Aires

25 February 2018 Test Match	Argentina	5–0	New Zealand	Buenos Aires, Argentina
18:00	Sánchez Moccia 2'; Ma. Fernández 13'; Jankunas 43'; Toccalino 44'; Merino 49'	Report		Stadium: Club Ciudad de Buenos Aires

27 February 2018 Test Match	Argentina	2–1	New Zealand	Buenos Aires, Argentina
18:00	Cavallero 50'; Ma. Fernández 55'	Report	Smith 58'	Stadium: Club Ciudad de Buenos Aires

==== XXI Commonwealth Games ====
5 April 2018 Group Stage	Scotland	1–6	New Zealand	Gold Coast, Australia
11:30	Howie 53'	Report	Smith 10'; Neal 12'; Gloyn 18', 48'; Keddell 18', 45'	Stadium: Gold Coast Hockey Centre

6 April 2018 Group Stage	New Zealand	12–0	Ghana	Gold Coast, Australia
16:30	Doar 10', 50', 53'; Smith 14'; Charlton 16'; Gloyn 28'; Michelsen 33'; Merry 35'; Harrison 43'; McLaren 49', 59'; Robinson 51'	Report		Stadium: Gold Coast Hockey Centre

8 April 2018 Group Stage	New Zealand	0–0	Canada	Gold Coast, Australia
11:30		Report		Stadium: Gold Coast Hockey Centre

9 April 2018 Group Stage	Australia	0–0	New Zealand	Gold Coast, Australia
21:30		Report		Stadium: Gold Coast Hockey Centre

12 April 2018 Semi-Finals	England	0–0 (1–2 p)	New Zealand	Gold Coast, Australia
19:00		Report		Stadium: Gold Coast Hockey Centre
	Penalties
	Danson (penalty shoot-out missed); Bray (penalty shoot-out missed); Martin (penalty shoot-out scored); Toman (penalty shoot-out missed); Pearne-Webb (penalty shoot-out missed)		(penalty shoot-out missed) Charlton; (penalty shoot-out missed) Thompson; (penalty shoot-out scored) Harrison; (penalty shoot-out missed) Gunson; (penalty shoot-out scored) Michelsen

14 April 2018 Gold Medal Match	New Zealand	4–1	Australia	Gold Coast, Australia
12:45	Gloyn 28'; Keddell 34'; Merry 42'; McLaren 56'	Report	Kenny 50'	Stadium: Gold Coast Hockey Centre

==== Tri–Nations Tournament ====
19 May 2018 Group Stage	New Zealand	1–2	Japan	Cromwell, New Zealand
16:30	Harrison 20'	Report	Kato 14'; Oikawa 55'	Stadium: Central Otago Sports Club

20 May 2018 Group Stage	Australia	4–1	New Zealand	Cromwell, New Zealand
14:30	Kenny 2'; Peris 27'; Brazel 41'; Commerford 57'	Report	Merry 8'	Stadium: Central Otago Sports Club

22 May 2018 Group Stage	New Zealand	4–1	Japan	Cromwell, New Zealand
18:30	Doar 8'; Merry 33'; McLaren 49'; Smith 54'	Report	Y. Nagai 35'	Stadium: Central Otago Sports Club

23 May 2018 Group Stage	Australia	3–0	New Zealand	Cromwell, New Zealand
18:30	Fitzpatrick 14'; Malone 40'; Kershaw 57'	Report		Stadium: Central Otago Sports Club

26 May 2018 Semi-Final	Japan	3–3 (0–2 p)	New Zealand	Cromwell, New Zealand
16:30	Toriyama 17', 40'; Y. Nagai 35'	Report	Gloyn 27'; Harrison 57'; Merry 60+'	Stadium: Central Otago Sports Club
	Penalties
	Kato (penalty shoot-out missed); Y. Nagai (penalty shoot-out missed); H. Nagai (penalty shoot-out missed); Karino (penalty shoot-out missed)		(penalty shoot-out scored) Merry; (penalty shoot-out missed) Smith; (penalty shoot-out scored) Gunson; (penalty shoot-out missed) Tuilotolava

27 May 2018 Final	New Zealand	1–4	Australia	Cromwell, New Zealand
14:30	Harrison 19'	Report	Kenny 8'; Malone 30'; Hurtz 35'; Peris 45'	Stadium: Central Otago Sports Club

==== Four Nations Cup ====
11 July 2018 Match 1	New Zealand	1–3	Netherlands	Grünwald, Germany
16:00	Gloyn 10'	Report	Van Maasakker 32'; Verschoor 52'; Stam 58'	Stadium: TSV Grünwald

12 July 2018 Match 2	Germany	2–3	New Zealand	Grünwald, Germany
19:30	Altenburg 3'; Mävers 33'	Report	Gloyn 2'; Neal 23'; Robinson 26'	Stadium: TSV Grünwald

14 July 2018 Match 3	New Zealand	2–3	Argentina	Grünwald, Germany
11:00	Doar 39'; McLaren 46'	Report	Cavallero 3'; Merino 48'; Barrionuevo 58'	Stadium: TSV Grünwald

==== XIV FIH World Cup ====
22 July 2018 Group Stage	New Zealand	4–2	Belgium	London, Great Britain
19:00	Smith 24'; Gloyn 32'; Merry 32', 54'	Report	Versavel 28'; Boon 30'	Stadium: Lee Valley Hockey and Tennis Centre

24 July 2018 Group Stage	Japan	2–1	New Zealand	London, Great Britain
12:30	Oikawa 35'; Shimizu 48'	Report	McLaren 52'	Stadium: Lee Valley Hockey and Tennis Centre

28 July 2018 Group Stage	New Zealand	1–1	Australia	London, Great Britain
20:00	Merry 13'	Report	Smith 18'	Stadium: Lee Valley Hockey and Tennis Centre

30 July 2018 Crossover	Argentina	2–0	Australia	London, Great Britain
20:15	Barrionuevo 25'; Merino 49'	Report		Stadium: Lee Valley Hockey and Tennis Centre

=== 2019 Results ===
Team	Pld	W	WD	LD	L	GF	GA	GD	Pts
New Zealand	19	7	0	1	11	35	37	−2	22

Source: FIH

==== FIH Pro League ====
27 January 2019 Group Stage	New Zealand	0–1	Netherlands	Auckland, New Zealand
16:30		Report	Krekelaar 38'	Stadium: North Harbour Hockey Stadium

1 February 2019 Group Stage	New Zealand	0–1	Belgium	Auckland, New Zealand
17:00		Report	Boon 59'	Stadium: North Harbour Hockey Stadium

8 February 2019 Group Stage	New Zealand	5–1	Great Britain	Christchurch, New Zealand
19:00	Merry 5', 35', 51'; Gunson 19'; Robinson 59'	Report	Ansley 11'	Stadium: Ngā Puna Wai Hockey Stadium

15 February 2019 Group Stage	New Zealand	1–3	Germany	Christchurch, New Zealand
17:00	Robinson 1'	Report	Stapenhorst 21'; Maertens 29'; Gablać 40'	Stadium: Ngā Puna Wai Hockey Stadium

17 February 2019 Group Stage	New Zealand	2–0	China	Christchurch, New Zealand
17:30	Merry 32', 57'	Report		Stadium: Ngā Puna Wai Hockey Stadium

8 March 2019 Group Stage	New Zealand	3–1	United States	Auckland, New Zealand
17:00	Merry 19'; Pearce 25'; Gunson 34'	Report	Grega 51'	Stadium: North Harbour Hockey Stadium

10 March 2019 Group Stage	New Zealand	0–3	Argentina	Auckland, New Zealand
16:30		Report	Albertario 14'; Retegui 23'; Luchetti 47'	Stadium: North Harbour Hockey Stadium

17 March 2019 Group Stage	Australia	1–3	New Zealand	Sydney, Australia
17:00	S. Fitzpatrick 48'	Report	Merry 17', 32'; Robinson 52'	Stadium: Sydney Olympic Park

22 March 2019 Group Stage	China	5–3	New Zealand	Changzhou, China
16:00	Cui 9'; Zhang X. 19'; Gu 51', 60+'; Guo 56'	Report	Michelsen 52'; Gloyn 54'; Keddell 60'	Stadium: Wujin Hockey Stadium

13 April 2019 Group Stage	Argentina	3–1	New Zealand	Rosario, Argentina
15:30	Alonso 29'; Jankunas 48'; Trinchinetti 52'	Report	Michelsen 26'	Stadium: Estadio Mundialista Luciana Aymar

25 April 2019 Group Stage	New Zealand	1–5	Australia	Auckland, New Zealand
14:30	Ritchie 30'	Report	Nobbs 2'; Chalker 21'; S. Fitzpatrick 31'; Stewart 53', 58'	Stadium: North Harbour Hockey Stadium

1 June 2019 Group Stage	United States	0–3	New Zealand	Lancaster, United States
19:00		Report	Davey 20'; Gloyn 32'; Merry 51'	Stadium: North Harbour Hockey Stadium

9 June 2019 Group Stage	Germany	2–1	New Zealand	Krefeld, Germany
12:00	Maertens 48'; Pieper 52'	Report	Pearce 8'	Stadium: Crefelder Hockey und Tennis Club, Krefeld

12 June 2019 Group Stage	Netherlands	3–2	New Zealand	's-Hertogenbosch, Netherlands
19:30	Jonker 21'; Albers 24'; De Waard 55'	Report	Merry 44', 54'	Stadium: HC Den Bosch

16 June 2019 Group Stage	Belgium	0–3	New Zealand	Antwerp, Belgium
16:30		Report	Merry 36', 44', 59'	Stadium: Wilrijkse Plein

23 June 2019 Group Stage	Great Britain	3–1	New Zealand	London, Great Britain
16:30	Martin 23'; Owsley 34', 42'	Report	Merry 44'	Stadium: Twickenham Stoop

==== Oceania Cup ====
5 September 2019 Match 1	Australia	1–3	New Zealand	Rockhampton, Australia
18:00	Lawton 54'	Report	Hull 20'; Robinson 42'; Michelsen 43'	Stadium: Kalka Shades Hockey Fields

7 September 2019 Match 2	Australia	3–2	New Zealand	Rockhampton, Australia
16:00	M. Fitzpatrick 5'; Peris 43'; R. Taylor 60'	Report	Merry 15'; Gunson 47'	Stadium: Kalka Shades Hockey Fields

8 September 2019 Match 3	Australia	1–1	New Zealand	Rockhampton, Australia
16:00	Williams 2'	Report	Merry 55'	Stadium: Kalka Shades Hockey Fields

=== 2020 Results ===
Team	Pld	W	WD	LD	L	GF	GA	GD	Pts
New Zealand	8	4	0	2	2	19	14	+5	14

Source: FIH

==== FIH Pro League ====
1 February 2020 Home 1	New Zealand	1–2	Belgium	Auckland, New Zealand
17:00	McCaw 17'	Report	Ballenghien 2'; Weyns 51'	Stadium: North Harbour Hockey Stadium

2 February 2020 Home 2	New Zealand	4–1	Belgium	Auckland, New Zealand
15:00	Merry 31', 35', 51', 55'	Report	Raye 7'	Stadium: North Harbour Hockey Stadium

8 February 2020 Home 3	New Zealand	0–3	Great Britain	Auckland, New Zealand
19:30		Report	Howard 9'; Watson 24'; McCallin 50'	Stadium: North Harbour Hockey Stadium

9 February 2020 Home 4	New Zealand	2–2 (4–5 p)	Great Britain	Auckland, New Zealand
17:30	Shannon 28', 53'	Report	Toman 38'; Balsdon 42'	Stadium: North Harbour Hockey Stadium
	Penalties
	Shannon (penalty shoot-out scored); Charlton (penalty shoot-out missed); Merry (penalty shoot-out scored); Ralph (penalty shoot-out scored); Michelsen (penalty shoot-out scored); Michelsen (penalty shoot-out missed)		(penalty shoot-out scored) Howard; (penalty shoot-out scored) Owsley; (penalty shoot-out scored) Martin; (penalty shoot-out scored) Robertson; (penalty shoot-out missed) Toman; (penalty shoot-out scored) Howard

15 February 2020 Home 5	New Zealand	3–1	United States	Christchurch, New Zealand
17:00	Merry 13'; Shannon 22'; Keddell 33'	Report	Campbell 44'	Stadium: Ngā Puna Wai Sports Hub

16 February 2020 Home 6	New Zealand	3–1	United States	Christchurch, New Zealand
20:30	Merry 16'; Michelsen 38'; Jaques 54'	Report	Grega 47'	Stadium: Ngā Puna Wai Sports Hub

28 February 2020 Home 7	New Zealand	1–1 (1–3 p)	Argentina	Christchurch, New Zealand
20:00	Ralph 19'	Report	Albertario 37'	Stadium: Ngā Puna Wai Sports Hub
	Penalties
	Shannon (penalty shoot-out missed); Charlton (penalty shoot-out scored); Merry (penalty shoot-out missed); Ralph (penalty shoot-out missed)		(penalty shoot-out scored) Jankunas; (penalty shoot-out scored) Miranda; (penalty shoot-out missed) Albertario; (penalty shoot-out missed) M. Granatto; (penalty shoot-out scored) Jardel

1 March 2020 Home 8	New Zealand	5–3	Argentina	Christchurch, New Zealand
17:30	Merry 3', 11', 13', 54'; Ralph 47'	Report	M. Granatto 26', 31'; Gorzelany 48'	Stadium: Ngā Puna Wai Sports Hub
