= Hockey at the 2018 Commonwealth Games =

Field hockey at the 2018 Commonwealth Games
- Venue: Gold Coast Hockey Centre
- Dates: 5–14 April 2018
- Competitors: 360 from 11 nations

Hockey at the 2018 Commonwealth Games was the sixth appearance of Hockey at the Commonwealth Games. The field hockey competition was held on the Gold Coast, Australia, from 5 to 14 April. The hockey competition was held at the Gold Coast Hockey Centre. This is the sixth time that hockey was held, following the sport's debut at the 1998 Games.

== Competition schedule ==
The following is the competition schedule for the hockey competitions:

P	Pool stage	CM	Classification matches	½	Semi-finals	B	Bronze medal match	G	Gold medal match

Event↓/Date →	Thu 5	Fri 6	Sat 7	Sun 8	Mon 9	Tue 10	Wed 11	Thu 12		Fri 13		Sat 14	
Men	P	P	P	P		P	P			CM	½	B	G
Women	P	P	P	P	P	P	P	CM	½	CM		B	G

== Qualification ==
A total of ten men's and women's team qualified to compete at the games. Each nation may enter one team in each tournament (18 athletes per team) for a maximum total of 36 athletes. The host nation (Australia) along with the top nine ranked nations in the FIH World Rankings as of 31 October 2017, qualified for the games.

=== Men's qualification ===
Event	Date	Teams	Qualified
Host Nation	—N/a	1	Australia
FIH World Rankings	31 October 2017	9	India; England; New Zealand; Canada; Malaysia; Pakistan; South Africa; Scotland; Wales
Total		10	

=== Women's qualification ===
Event	Date	Teams	Qualified
Host Nation	—N/a	1	Australia
FIH World Rankings	31 October 2017	9	England; New Zealand; India; South Africa; Scotland; Canada; Malaysia; Wales; Ghana
Total		10	

== Men's competition ==
The competition consisted of two stages; a group stage followed by a knockout stage.

=== Group stage ===
Teams were divided into two groups of five nations, playing every team in their group once. Three points were awarded for a victory, one for a draw. The top two teams per group qualified for the semi-finals.

==== Group A ====
Pos	Team	Pld	W	D	L	GF	GA	GD	Pts	Qualification
1	Australia (H)	4	4	0	0	16	2	+14	12	Advance to Semi-finals
2	New Zealand	4	3	0	1	18	6	+12	9	Advance to Semi-finals
3	Scotland	4	1	0	3	7	14	−7	3	5th–6th place match
4	Canada	4	1	0	3	3	12	−9	3	7th–8th place match
5	South Africa	4	1	0	3	4	14	−10	3	9th–10th place match

Source: FIH
Rules for classification: 1) points; 2) number of wins; 3) goal difference; 4) goals scored; 5) head-to-head results.
(H) Hosts

==== Group B ====
Pos	Team	Pld	W	D	L	GF	GA	GD	Pts	Qualification
1	India	4	3	1	0	12	9	+3	10	Advance to Semi-finals
2	England	4	2	1	1	15	8	+7	7	Advance to Semi-finals
3	Malaysia	4	1	1	2	5	10	−5	4	5th–6th place match
4	Pakistan	4	0	4	0	6	6	0	4	7th–8th place match
5	Wales	4	0	1	3	6	11	−5	1	9th–10th place match

Source: FIH
Rules for classification: 1) points; 2) number of wins; 3) goal difference; 4) goals scored; 5) head-to-head results.

== Women's competition ==
The competition consisted of two stages; a group stage followed by a knockout stage.

=== Group stage ===
Teams were divided into two groups of five nations, playing every team in their group once. Three points were awarded for a victory, one for a draw. The top two teams per group qualified for the semi-finals.

==== Group A ====
Pos	Team	Pld	W	D	L	GF	GA	GD	Pts	Qualification
1	England	4	3	0	1	11	3	+8	9	Advance to Semi-finals
2	India	4	3	0	1	9	5	+4	9	Advance to Semi-finals
3	South Africa	4	1	1	2	3	4	−1	4	5th–6th place match
4	Malaysia	4	1	1	2	3	8	−5	4	7th–8th place match
5	Wales	4	1	0	3	4	10	−6	3	9th–10th place match

Source: FIH
Rules for classification: 1) points; 2) number of wins; 3) goal difference; 4) goals scored; 5) head-to-head results.

==== Group B ====
Pos	Team	Pld	W	D	L	GF	GA	GD	Pts	Qualification
1	Australia (H)	4	3	1	0	8	0	+8	10	Advance to Semi-finals
2	New Zealand	4	2	2	0	18	1	+17	8	Advance to Semi-finals
3	Canada	4	1	2	1	5	2	+3	5	5th–6th place match
4	Scotland	4	1	1	2	6	8	−2	4	7th–8th place match
5	Ghana	4	0	0	4	1	27	−26	0	9th–10th place match

Source: FIH
Rules for classification: 1) points; 2) number of wins; 3) goal difference; 4) goals scored; 5) head-to-head results.
(H) Hosts

=== Medal round ===
Semi-finals
12 April 2018
England	0 (1)
New Zealand (p.s.o)	0 (2)
12 April 2018
Australia	1
India	0

Gold medal match
14 April 2018
New Zealand	4
Australia	1
Bronze medal match
14 April 2018
England	6
India	0

== Medal summary ==
=== Medal table ===
* Host nation (Australia)

Rank	Nation	Gold	Silver	Bronze	Total
1	Australia*	1	1	0	2
1	New Zealand	1	1	0	2
3	England	0	0	2	2
Totals (3 entries)		2	2	2	6

=== Medalists ===
Event	Gold	Silver	Bronze
Men	Australia; Lachlan Sharp; Tom Craig; Jake Harvie; Tom Wickham; Matthew Dawson; Jeremy Edwards; Mark Knowles; Eddie Ockenden; Jacob Whetton; Aaron Kleinschmidt; Aran Zalewski; Flynn Ogilvie; Daniel Beale; Tyler Lovell; Trent Mitton; Dylan Wotherspoon; Andrew Charter; Jeremy Hayward	New Zealand; Cory Bennett; Dane Lett; Harry Miskimmin; Nick Ross; Richard Joyce; Marcus Child; Jared Panchia; Aidan Sarikaya; Nic Woods; Devon Manchester; Kane Russell; Arun Panchia; Shea McAleese; Stephen Jenness; Dominic Newman; Hugo Inglis; George Muir; Hayden Phillips	England; George Pinner; Harry Gibson; Ollie Willars; Henry Weir; Harry Martin; Chris Griffiths; Ian Sloan; Sam Ward; Mark Gleghorne; Phil Roper; Adam Dixon; Barry Middleton; Brendan Creed; David Goodfield; Liam Ansell; David Condon; James Gall; Liam Sanford
Women	New Zealand; Tarryn Davey; Sam Harrison; Olivia Merry; Frances Davies; Amy Robinson; Sally Rutherford; Brooke Neal; Ella Gunson; Sam Charlton; Grace O'Hanlon; Liz Thompson; Rose Keddell; Kelsey Smith; Pippa Hayward; Shiloh Gloyn; Madison Doar; Stacey Michelsen; Anita McLaren	Australia; Gabrielle Nance; Brooke Peris; Emily Hurtz; Jodie Kenny; Karri McMahon; Edwina Bone; Stephanie Kershaw; Kaitlin Nobbs; Jordyn Holzberger; Jane Claxton; Jocelyn Bartram; Renee Taylor; Madi Ratcliffe; Ashlea Fey; Emily Smith; Rachael Lynch; Grace Stewart; Savannah Fitzpatrick	England; Maddie Hinch; Kathryn Lane; Laura Unsworth; Sarah Haycroft; Anna Toman; Hannah Martin; Susannah Townsend; Suzy Petty; Ellie Rayer; Alex Danson; Emily Defroand; Giselle Ansley; Sophie Bray; Hollie Pearne-Webb; Ellie Watton; Amy Tennant; Jo Hunter; Grace Balsdon

== Participating nations ==
There are 11 participating nations at the hockey competitions with a total of 360 athletes. The number of athletes a nation entered is in parentheses beside the name of the country.

- Australia (36)
- Canada (36)
- England (36)
- Ghana (18)
- India (36)
- Malaysia (36)
- New Zealand (36)
- Pakistan (18)
- Scotland (36)
- South Africa (36)
- Wales (36)
