= 2018 Women's Four Nations Cup =

Field hockey tournament in Germany

Tournament details
- Host country: Germany
- City: Grünwald
- Teams: 4
- Venue(s): TSV Grünwald

Final positions
- Champions: Netherlands (1st title)
- Runner-up: Argentina
- Third place: New Zealand

Tournament statistics
- Matches played: 6
- Goals scored: 24 (4 per match)
- Top scorer(s): 5 players (see list below) (2 goals)

The 2018 Women's Four Nations Cup was the eighth Hockey Four Nations Cup, an international women's field hockey tournament, consisting of a series of test matches. It was held in Germany, from July 11 to 14, 2018, and featured four of the top nations in women's field hockey.

== Competition format ==
The tournament featured the national teams of Argentina, Netherlands, New Zealand, and the hosts, Germany, competing in a round-robin format, with each team playing each other once. Three points will be awarded for a win, one for a draw, and none for a loss.

Country	July 2018 FIH Ranking	Best World Cup finish	Best Olympic Games finish
Argentina	3	Champions (2002, 2010)	Runners–up (2000, 2012)
Germany	6	Champions (1976, 1981)	Champions (2004)
Netherlands	1	Champions (1974, 1978, 1983, 1986, 1990, 2006, 2014)	Champions (1984, 2008, 2012)
New Zealand	4	Fourth place (1986)	Fourth place (2012, 2016)

== Results ==
Pos	Team	Pld	W	D	L	GF	GA	GD	Pts	Result
1	Netherlands	3	3	0	0	9	2	+7	9	Tournament Champion
2	Argentina	3	2	0	1	6	5	+1	6	
3	New Zealand	3	1	0	2	6	8	−2	3	
4	Germany (H)	3	0	0	3	3	9	−6	0	

Source: FIH
Rules for classification:
- Points
- Goal difference
- Goals scored
- Games won
- Head-to-head
(H) Hosts

=== Matches ===
11 July 2018
16:00

New Zealand	1–3	Netherlands
Gloyn 10'	Report	van Maasakker 32'; Verschoor 52'; Stam 58'

Umpires:
Laurine Delforge (BEL)
Michelle Meister (GER)

11 July 2018
18:00

Germany	1–2	Argentina
Schröder 19'	Report	Albertario 21'; Barrionuevo 60'

Umpires:
Amber Church (NZL)
Fanneke Alkemade (NED)

12 July 2018
17:30

Argentina	1–2	Netherlands
Merino 28'	Report	de Waard 8'; Matla 22'

Umpires:
Michelle Meister (GER)
Amber Church (NZL)

12 July 2018
19:30

Germany	2–3	New Zealand
Altenburg 3'; Mävers 33'	Report	Gloyn 2'; Neal 23'; Robinson 26'

Umpires:
Andrea Soria (ARG)
Laurine Delforge (BEL)

14 July 2018
11:00

New Zealand	2–3	Argentina
Doar 39'; McLaren 46'	Report	Cavallero 3'; Merino 48'; Barrionuevo 58'

Umpires:
Fanneke Alkemade (NED)
Laurine Delforge (BEL)

14 July 2018
13:00

Germany	0–4	Netherlands
	Report	van Geffen 27'; Matla 28'; Welten 33'; Stam 51'

Umpires:
Amber Church (NZL)
Andrea Soria (ARG)

== Statistics ==
=== Goalscorers ===
2 Goals

- (Argentina) Noel Barrionuevo
- (Argentina) Delfina Merino
- (New Zealand) Shiloh Gloyn
- (Netherlands) Frédérique Matla
- (Netherlands) Lauren Stam

1 Goal

- (Argentina) Agustina Albertario
- (Argentina) Martina Cavallero
- (Germany) Lisa Altenburg
- (Germany) Marie Mävers
- (Germany) Anne Schröder
- (Netherlands) Xan de Waard
- (Netherlands) Margot van Geffen
- (Netherlands) Caia van Maasakker
- (Netherlands) Maria Verschoor
- (Netherlands) Lidewij Welten
- (New Zealand) Madison Doar
- (New Zealand) Anita McLaren
- (New Zealand) Brooke Neal
- (New Zealand) Amy Robinson
