= 2018 Women's Tri-Nations Hockey Tournament =

Tournament details
- Host country: New Zealand
- City: Cromwell
- Dates: 19–27 May
- Teams: 3
- Venue: Central Otago Sports Club

Final positions
- Champions: Australia (1st title)
- Runner-up: New Zealand
- Third place: Japan

Tournament statistics
- Matches played: 8
- Goals scored: 33 (4.13 per match)
- Top scorer(s): (Australia) Ambrosia Malone (Australia) Brooke Peris (New Zealand) Olivia Merry (New Zealand) Samantha Harrison (3 goals)

The 2018 Women's Tri-Nations Hockey Tournament was an invitational women's field hockey competition, hosted by the New Zealand Hockey Federation. The tournament took place between 19 and 27 May 2018 in Cromwell, New Zealand. A total of three teams competed for the title.

Australia won the tournament by defeating New Zealand 4–1 in the final. Japan finished in third place, after being eliminated by New Zealand in the Semi-final.

== Teams ==
Including New Zealand, 3 teams were invited by the New Zealand Hockey Federation to participate in the tournament.

- Australia
- Japan
- New Zealand (host nation)

== Results ==
=== Round Robin ===
Pos	Team	Pld	W	D	L	GF	GA	GD	Pts	Qualification
1	Australia	4	3	0	1	11	3	+8	9	Final
2	Japan	4	2	0	2	5	9	−4	6	Semi-final
3	New Zealand (H)	4	1	0	3	6	10	−4	3	Semi-final

Source: FIH
Rules for classification: 1) points; 2) goal difference; 3) games won.; 4) head-to-head result.
(H) Hosts

19 May 2018
16:30

New Zealand	1–2	Japan
Harrison 20'	Report	Kato 14'; Oikawa 55'

Umpires:
Chieko Soma (JPN)
Emily Carroll (AUS)

20 May 2018
14:30

Australia	4–1	New Zealand
Kenny 2'; Peris 27'; Brazel 41'; Commerford 57'	Report	Merry 8'

Umpires:
Chieko Soma (JPN)
Lani Jackman (NZL)

21 May 2018
18:30

Japan	1–4	Australia
Oikawa 14'	Report	Malone 1'; Commerford 30'; Peris 32'; Taylor 36'

Umpires:
Lani Jackman (NZL)
Emily Carroll (AUS)

22 May 2018
18:30

New Zealand	4–1	Japan
Doar 8'; Merry 33'; McLaren 49'; Smith 54'	Report	Y. Nagai 35'

Umpires:
Chieko Soma (JPN)
Lani Jackman (NZL)

23 May 2018
18:30

Australia	3–0	New Zealand
Fitzpatrick 14'; Malone 40'; Kershaw 57'	Report

Umpires:
Lani Jackman (NZL)
Emily Carroll (AUS)

24 May 2018
18:30

Japan	1–0	Australia
Mori 23'	Report

Umpires:
Kelly Hudson (NZL)
Chieko Soma (JPN)

=== Classification round ===
Semi-final
26 May 2018
Japan	3 (0)
New Zealand (p.s.o)	3 (2)

Final
27 May 2018
Australia	4
New Zealand	1

==== Semi-final ====
26 May 2018
16:30

Japan	3–3	New Zealand
Toriyama 17', 40'; Y. Nagai 35'	Report	Gloyn 27'; Harrison 57'; Merry 60+'
Penalties
Kato (penalty shoot-out missed); Y. Nagai (penalty shoot-out missed); H. Nagai (penalty shoot-out missed); Karino (penalty shoot-out missed)	0–2	(penalty shoot-out scored) Merry; (penalty shoot-out missed) Smith; (penalty shoot-out scored) Gunson; (penalty shoot-out missed) Tuilotolava

Umpires:
Kelly Hudson (NZL)
Emily Carroll (AUS)

==== Final ====
27 May 2018
14:30

Australia	4–1	New Zealand
Kenny 8'; Malone 30'; Hurtz 35'; Peris 45'	Report	Harrison 19'

Umpires:
Kelly Hudson (NZL)
Chieko Soma (JPN)

== Statistics ==
=== Final standings ===
As per statistical convention in field hockey, matches decided in extra time are counted as wins and losses, while matches decided by penalty shoot-outs are counted as draws.

Pos	Team	Pld	W	D	L	GF	GA	GD	Pts	Final Result
1st place, gold medalist(s)	Australia	5	4	0	1	15	4	+11	12	Gold Medal
2nd place, silver medalist(s)	New Zealand	6	1	1	4	10	17	−7	4	Silver Medal
3rd place, bronze medalist(s)	Japan	5	2	1	2	8	12	−4	7	Bronze Medal

Source: FIH

=== Goalscorers ===
3 Goals

- (Australia) Ambrosia Malone
- (Australia) Brooke Peris
- (New Zealand) Samantha Harrison
- (New Zealand) Olivia Merry

2 Goals

- (Australia) Kalindi Commerford
- (Australia) Jodie Kenny
- (Japan) Yuri Nagai
- (Japan) Shihori Oikawa
- (Japan) Mai Toriyama

1 Goal

- (Australia) Lily Brazel
- (Australia) Savannah Fitzpatrick
- (Australia) Emily Hurtz
- (Australia) Stephanie Kershaw
- (Australia) Renee Taylor
- (Japan) Akiko Kato
- (Japan) Kanon Mori
- (New Zealand) Madison Doar
- (New Zealand) Shiloh Gloyn
- (New Zealand) Anita McLaren
- (New Zealand) Kelsey Smith
