= 2014 Under 21 Women's Australian Hockey Championships =

2014 Under 21 Women's Australian Championships
Tournament details
- Host country: Australia
- City: Perth
- Teams: 7
- Venue: Perth Hockey Stadium

Final positions
- Champions: (New South Wales) NSW
- Runner-up: (Queensland) QLD
- Third place: (Australian Capital Territory) ACT

Tournament statistics
- Matches played: 27
- Goals scored: 116 (4.3 per match)
- Top scorer: (Queensland) Murphy Allendorf (7 goals)

The 2014 Under 21 Women's Australian Championships was a women's Field Hockey tournament held in the Western Australia city of Perth.

New South Wales won the gold medal after defeating Queensland 3–1 in the final. Australian Capital Territory won the bronze medal by defeating South Australia 1–0 in the third and fourth playoff.

== Competition format ==
The tournament is played in a round-robin format, with each team facing each other once. Final placings after the pool matches determine playoffs.

The bottom two teams play in a classification match, with the winner progressing to play the fifth placed team in the fifth and sixth place playoff, while the loser finishes in seventh place.

The top four teams contest the medal round. Two semi-finals are played, with the first placed team taking on the fourth placed team and the second placed team taking on the third placed team. The winners progress to the final, while the losers contest the third and fourth place playoff.

== Teams ==
- Australian Capital Territory
- New South Wales
- Queensland
- South Australia
- Tasmania
- (Victoria (state)) Victoria
- Western Australia

== Results ==
=== Pool matches ===
==== Pool ====
Pos	Team	Pld	W	D	L	GF	GA	GD	Pts	Qualification
1	(New South Wales) NSW	6	5	0	1	28	6	+22	15	Semi-Finals
2	(Queensland) QLD	6	5	0	1	24	7	+17	15	Semi-Finals
3	(South Australia) SA	6	4	0	2	13	9	+4	12	Semi-Finals
4	(Australian Capital Territory) ACT	6	3	0	3	11	19	−8	9	Semi-Finals
5	(Victoria (state)) VIC	6	2	0	4	11	18	−7	6	5th-7th
6	(Western Australia) WA	6	2	0	4	4	13	−9	6	5th-7th
7	(Tasmania) TAS	6	0	0	6	3	22	−19	0	5th-7th

1 July 2014
10:00

QLD (Queensland)	3–0	(Western Australia) WA
R. Taylor 3'; Kershaw 17'; Fitzpatrick 68'	Report

Perth Hockey Stadium
Umpires:
Michelle Farnill (AUS)
Rachel Beagley (AUS)

1 July 2014
12:00

SA (South Australia)	4–2	(Victoria (state)) VIC
Divall 9'; Rudd 19', 50'; Spano 45'	Report	Peskett 20'; Salanowski 35'

Perth Hockey Stadium
Umpires:
Angela May (AUS)
Kristy Robertson (AUS)

1 July 2014
14:00

ACT (Australian Capital Territory)	2–1	(Tasmania) TAS
Smith 44'; Plumb 56'	Report	Brennan 49'

Perth Hockey Stadium
Umpires:
Tamara Leonard (AUS)
Kerryl Chandler (AUS)

2 July 2014
10:00

VIC (Victoria (state))	2–4	(Queensland) QLD
Bates 48'; Breen 66'	Report	Kershaw 10', 12'; Stone 30'; Anderson 59'

Perth Hockey Stadium
Umpires:
Emily Nunn (AUS)
Emma Cairnduff (AUS)

2 July 2014
12:00

WA (Western Australia)	1–0	(Tasmania) TAS
Flynn 41'	Report

Perth Hockey Stadium
Umpires:
Keeley O'Reilly (AUS)
Michelle Farnill (AUS)

2 July 2014
14:00

NSW (New South Wales)	9–0	(Australian Capital Territory) ACT
Williams 2'; Gray 18'; Richards 27', 44'; Morgan 33'; Hayes 35'; Risk 57', 63'; Rosser 69'	Report

Perth Hockey Stadium
Umpires:
Angela May (AUS)
Rachel Beagley (AUS)

3 July 2014
10:00

TAS (Tasmania)	1–5	(Victoria (state)) VIC
Hinton 59'	Report	Breen 8'; Barden 50'; Ratcliffe 65'; Goode 67'; S. Taylor 70'

Perth Hockey Stadium
Umpires:
Kerryl Chandler (AUS)
Emma Cairnduff (AUS)

3 July 2014
12:00

ACT (Australian Capital Territory)	2–0	(South Australia) SA
Kindon 44'; Commerford 64'	Report

Perth Hockey Stadium
Umpires:
Kristy Robertson (AUS)
Emily Nunn (AUS)

3 July 2014
14:00

NSW (New South Wales)	4–0	(Western Australia) WA
Simpson 8'; Morgan 19'; Hanna 28'; Risk 43'	Report

Perth Hockey Stadium
Umpires:
Tamara Leonard (AUS)
Keeley O'Reilly (AUS)

5 July 2014
10:00

NSW (New South Wales)	7–0	(Tasmania) TAS
Watterson 16', 33', 62'; Hayes 38', 61'; Rosser 48'; Williams 52'	Report

Perth Hockey Stadium
Umpires:
Michelle Farnill (AUS)
Kerryl Chandler (AUS)

5 July 2014
12:00

QLD (Queensland)	2–3	(South Australia) SA
Watson 2'; Hillas 7'	Report	Rudd 9'; Nance 67'; Mutch 70'

Perth Hockey Stadium
Umpires:
Angela May (AUS)
Keeley O'Reilly (AUS)

5 July 2014
14:00

WA (Western Australia)	3–2	(Australian Capital Territory) ACT
Slattery 20', 69'; Flynn 58'	Report	Commerford 3'; Plumb 55'

Perth Hockey Stadium
Umpires:
Rachel Beagley (AUS)
Tamara Leonard (AUS)

6 July 2014
10:00

NSW (New South Wales)	0–5	(Queensland) QLD
	Report	Allendorf 8', 47'; Holzberger 18'; Lammon 22'; Kershaw 51'

Perth Hockey Stadium
Umpires:
Kristy Robertson (AUS)
Keeley O'Reilly (AUS)

6 July 2014
12:00

SA (South Australia)	2–1	(Tasmania) TAS
Nance 45'; Banks 48'	Report	Arthur 12'

Perth Hockey Stadium
Umpires:
Tamara Leonard (AUS)
Kerryl Chandler (AUS)

6 July 2014
14:00

ACT (Australian Capital Territory)	3–1	(Victoria (state)) VIC
Montgomery 21'; Kindon 30'; Gilmore 51'	Report	Ratcliffe 70'

Perth Hockey Stadium
Umpires:
Michelle Farnill (AUS)
Emma Cairnduff (AUS)

8 July 2014
10:00

WA (Western Australia)	0–1	(Victoria (state)) VIC
	Report	Goode 10'

Perth Hockey Stadium
Umpires:
Angela May (AUS)
Kristy Robertson (AUS)

8 July 2014
12:00

SA (South Australia)	1–2	(New South Wales) NSW
Watters 56'	Report	Rosser 21'; Brazel 65'

Perth Hockey Stadium
Umpires:
Emily Nunn (AUS)
Rachel Beagley (AUS)

8 July 2014
14:00

QLD (Queensland)	5–0	(Tasmania) TAS
	Report	Anderson 21'; Kershaw 37'; Allendorf 53'; Fitzpatrick 58', 65'

Perth Hockey Stadium
Umpires:
Emma Cairnduff (AUS)
Tamara Leonard (AUS)

9 July 2014
10:00

SA (South Australia)	3–0	(Western Australia) WA
Abbott 15'; Watters 21', 30'	Report

Perth Hockey Stadium
Umpires:
Keeley O'Reilly (AUS)
Kerryl Chandler (AUS)

9 July 2014
12:00

NSW (New South Wales)	6–0	(Victoria (state)) VIC
Watterson 11', 29', 59'; Simpson 19'; Nobbs 47'; Hanna 51'	Report

Perth Hockey Stadium
Umpires:
Emma Cairnduff (AUS)
Kristy Robertson (AUS)

9 July 2014
14:00

QLD (Queensland)	5–2	(Australian Capital Territory) ACT
Allendorf 24', 34', 43'; Fitzpatrick 32'; Kershaw 54'	Report	Gilmore 67'; Smith 70'

Perth Hockey Stadium
Umpires:
Michelle Farnill (AUS)
Emily Nunn (AUS)

=== Fifth to seventh place classification ===
==== Crossover Match ====
11 July 2014
12:00

WA (Western Australia)	4–1	(Tasmania) TAS
Squibb 12'; Peacock 17'; Harris 50'; Gmeiner 62'	Report	Calvert 31'

Perth Hockey Stadium
Umpires:
Keeley O'Reilly (AUS)
Kerryl Chandler (AUS)

==== Fifth and sixth place ====
12 July 2014
12:00

VIC (Victoria (state))	3–2	(Western Australia) WA
Salanowski 12'; Ratcliffe 22'; S. Taylor 66'	Report	Gmeiner 39'; Slattery 58'

Perth Hockey Stadium
Umpires:
Emily Nunn (AUS)
Kristy Robertson (AUS)

=== First to fourth place classification ===
Semi-Finals
11 July 2014
(New South Wales) NSW	4
(Australian Capital Territory) ACT	1
11 July 2014
(Queensland) QLD (p.s.o)	1 (2)
(South Australia) SA	1 (1)

Gold-medal match
12 July 2014
(New South Wales) NSW	3
(Queensland) QLD	1
Broze Medal Match
12 July 2014
(Australian Capital Territory) ACT	1
(South Australia) SA	0

==== Semi-finals ====
11 July 2014
14:00

NSW (New South Wales)	4–1	(Australian Capital Territory) ACT
Rosser 1'; Williams 37', 69'; Simpson 42'	Report	Plumb 27'

Perth Hockey Stadium
Umpires:
Angela May (AUS)
Rachel Beagley (AUS)

11 July 2014
16:30

QLD (Queensland)	1–1	(South Australia) SA
Anderson 13'	Report	Grist 68'
Penalties
Holzberger (penalty shoot-out missed); Lammon (penalty shoot-out missed); Fitzpatrick (penalty shoot-out scored); Kershaw (penalty shoot-out missed); Allendorf (penalty shoot-out missed) —— Holzberger (penalty shoot-out scored)	2–1	(penalty shoot-out missed) Mutch; (penalty shoot-out scored) Nance; (penalty shoot-out missed) Rudd; (penalty shoot-out missed) MacLachlan; (penalty shoot-out missed) Watters —— (penalty shoot-out missed) Nance

Perth Hockey Stadium
Umpires:
Michelle Farnill (AUS)
Tamara Leonard (AUS)

==== Third and fourth place ====
12 July 2014
14:00

ACT (Australian Capital Territory)	1–0	(South Australia) SA
Montgomery 46'	Report

Perth Hockey Stadium
Umpires:
Angela May (AUS)
Keeley O'Reilly (AUS)

==== Final ====
12 July 2014
16:30

NSW (New South Wales)	3–1	(Queensland) QLD
Risk 29'; Brazel 43'; Richards 70'	Report	Allendorf 15'

Perth Hockey Stadium
Umpires:
Michelle Farnill (AUS)
Rachel Beagley (AUS)

== Statistics ==
=== Final standings ===
Pos	Team	Pld	W	D	L	GF	GA	GD	Pts	Final Result
1st place, gold medalist(s)	(New South Wales) NSW	8	7	0	1	35	8	+27	21	Gold Medal
2nd place, silver medalist(s)	(Queensland) QLD	8	5	1	2	26	11	+15	16	Silver Medal
3rd place, bronze medalist(s)	(Australian Capital Territory) ACT	8	4	0	4	13	23	−10	12	Bronze Medal
4	(South Australia) SA	8	4	1	3	14	11	+3	13	Fourth Place
5	(Victoria (state)) VIC	7	3	0	4	14	20	−6	9	Fifth place
6	(Western Australia) WA	8	3	0	5	10	17	−7	9	Sixth Place
7	(Tasmania) TAS	7	0	0	7	4	26	−22	0	Seventh Place
