= 2016–17 Women's FIH Hockey World League Final =

Field hockey tournament

Tournament details
- Host country: New Zealand
- City: Auckland
- Dates: 17–26 November
- Teams: 8
- Venue: North Harbour Hockey Stadium

Final positions
- Champions: Netherlands (2nd title)
- Runner-up: New Zealand
- Third place: South Korea

Tournament statistics
- Matches played: 22
- Goals scored: 74 (3.36 per match)
- Top scorer(s): (Argentina) Delfina Merino (Netherlands) Maartje Krekelaar (5 goals)
- Best player: (New Zealand) Stacey Michelsen

The 2016–17 Women's FIH Hockey World League Final took place between 17 and 26 November 2017 in Auckland, New Zealand. A total of eight teams competed for the title.

The Netherlands won the tournament for a record second time after defeating host nation New Zealand 3–0 in the final match. South Korea won the third place match by defeating England 1–0.

== Qualification ==
The host nation qualified automatically in addition to 7 teams qualified from the Semifinals. The following eight teams, shown with final pre-tournament rankings, competed in this round of the tournament.

Dates	Event	Location	Quotas	Qualifier(s)
	Host nation		1	New Zealand (5)
21 June – 2 July 2017	2016–17 FIH Hockey World League Semifinals	Brussels, Belgium	7	Netherlands (1); China (8); South Korea (9)
8–23 July 2017	2016–17 FIH Hockey World League Semifinals	Johannesburg, South Africa	7	United States (7); Germany (6); England (2); Argentina (3)
Total			8	

== Results ==
All times are local (UTC+13).

=== First round ===
==== Pool A ====
Pos	Team	Pld	W	D	L	GF	GA	GD	Pts
1	Netherlands	3	3	0	0	9	0	+9	9
2	United States	3	1	1	1	4	4	0	4
3	South Korea	3	1	1	1	3	5	−2	4
4	New Zealand	3	0	0	3	2	9	−7	0

Source: FIH
Rules for classification: 1) points; 2) goal difference; 3) goals scored; 4) head-to-head result.

17 November 2017
18:00

United States	1–1	South Korea
Matson 20'	Report	Jang S. 58'

Umpires:
Chieko Soma (JPN)
Alison Keogh (IRL)

17 November 2017
20:00

Netherlands	4–0	New Zealand
Jonker 11', 48'; Krekelaar 15'; Matla 39'	Report

Umpires:
Sarah Wilson (SCO)
Kim Jung-hee (KOR)

18 November 2017
18:00

New Zealand	1–2	South Korea
Goad 26'	Report	Cho H. 51'; Park S. 53'

Umpires:
Michelle Joubert (RSA)
Karine Alves (FRA)

18 November 2017
20:00

United States	0–2	Netherlands
	Report	Krekelaar 18', 37'

Umpires:
Miao Lin (CHN)
Karen Bennett (NZL)

20 November 2017
18:00

Netherlands	3–0	South Korea
Van Geffen 28'; Krekelaar 41'; Van Maasakker 56'	Report

Umpires:
Sarah Wilson (SCO)
Karine Alves (FRA)

20 November 2017
20:00

New Zealand	1–3	United States
Gunson 22'	Report	Witmer 9'; West 37', 45'

Umpires:
Michelle Joubert (RSA)
Ivona Makar (CRO)

==== Pool B ====
Pos	Team	Pld	W	D	L	GF	GA	GD	Pts
1	Argentina	3	3	0	0	8	1	+7	9
2	Germany	3	2	0	1	6	4	+2	6
3	England	3	1	0	2	4	4	0	3
4	China	3	0	0	3	1	10	−9	0

Source: FIH
Rules for classification: 1) points; 2) goal difference; 3) goals scored; 4) head-to-head result.

18 November 2017
12:00

England	0–2	Germany
	Report	Stapenhorst 51'; Lorenz 56'

Umpires:
Melissa Trivic (AUS)
Aleesha Unka (NZL)

18 November 2017
14:00

Argentina	3–0	China
Barrionuevo 4'; Cavallero 18'; Granatto 34'	Report

Umpires:
Chieko Soma (JPN)
Ivona Makar (CRO)

19 November 2017
18:00

Germany	3–0	China
Mävers 10', 13'; Martin-Pelegrina 55'	Report

Umpires:
Kim Jung-hee (KOR)
Aleesha Unka (NZL)

19 November 2017
20:00

Argentina	1–0	England
Merino 57'	Report

Umpires:
Melissa Trivic (AUS)
Alison Keogh (IRL)

21 November 2017
18:00

Germany	1–4	Argentina
Lorenz 55'	Report	Gomes Fantasia 17'; Granatto 19'; Merino 48'; Ortiz 49'

Umpires:
Chieko Soma (JPN)
Miao Lin (CHN)

21 November 2017
20:00

England	4–1	China
Danson 12'; Bray 15'; Martin 35'; Haycroft 54'	Report	Zhong 45'

Umpires:
Karen Bennett (NZL)
Alison Keogh (IRL)

=== Second round ===
Quarter-finals
Netherlands	4
China	0
Germany	3 (1)
South Korea (p.s.o.)	3 (3)
United States	1
England	2
Argentina	1
New Zealand	2

Semi-finals
Netherlands	2
South Korea	0
England	0
New Zealand	1

Final
26 November
Netherlands	3
New Zealand	0
Third place
26 November
South Korea	1
England	0

==== Quarterfinals ====
22 November 2017
18:00

Germany	3–3	South Korea
Lorenz 9', 42'; Mävers 36'	Report	Cho H. 28'; Jang H. 35'; Park S. 43'
Penalties
Altenburg (penalty shoot-out missed); Mävers (penalty shoot-out missed); Lorenz (penalty shoot-out scored); Stapenhorst (penalty shoot-out missed)	1–3	(penalty shoot-out scored) Park M. (penalty shoot-out scored) Park S. (penalty shoot-out missed) Lee; (penalty shoot-out scored) Cho E.

Umpires:
Melissa Trivic (AUS)
Miao Lin (CHN)

22 November 2017
20:15

Argentina	1–2	New Zealand
Merino 2'	Report	Neal 32'; Michelsen 33'

Umpires:
Sarah Wilson (SCO)
Alison Keogh (IRL)

23 November 2017
18:00

United States	1–2	England
González 54'	Report	Bray 7', 41'

Umpires:
Aleesha Unka (NZL)
Soma Chieko (JPN)

23 November 2017
20:15

Netherlands	4–0	China
Welten 4'; Keetels 23'; Van Maasakker 52'; Matla 57'	Report

Umpires:
Karen Bennett (NZL)
Karine Alves (FRA)

==== Fifth to eighth place classification ====
The losing quarterfinalists are ranked according to their first round results to determine the fixtures for the fifth to eighth place classification matches.

Pos	Team	Pld	W	D	L	GF	GA	GD	Pts
1	Argentina	3	3	0	0	8	1	+7	9
2	Germany	3	2	0	1	6	4	+2	6
3	United States	3	1	1	1	4	4	0	4
4	China	3	0	0	3	1	10	−9	0

Rules for classification: 1) points; 2) goal difference; 3) goals scored.

===== Seventh place game =====
25 November 2017
18:00

United States	6–4	China
Sharkey 13', 54'; Shealy 22', 29'; Witmer 28'; McCrudden 45'	Report	Gu 10'; Song 29', 35'; Wang 44'

Umpires:
Kim Jung-hee (KOR)
Karen Bennett (NZL)

===== Fifth place game =====
24 November 2017
18:00

Argentina	4–0	Germany
Trinchinetti 8'; Habif 12'; Merino 42', 60'	Report

Umpires:
Ivona Makar (CRO)
Miao Lin (CHN)

==== First to fourth place classification ====
===== Semifinals =====
24 November 2017
20:15

England	0–1	New Zealand
	Report	Merry 55'

Umpires:
Sarah Wilson (SCO)
Alison Keogh (IRL)

25 November 2017
20:15

Netherlands	2–0	South Korea
Krekelaar 6'; Leurink 18'	Report

Umpires:
Michelle Joubert (RSA)
Aleesha Unka (NZL)

===== Third place game =====
26 November 2017
18:00

South Korea	1–0	England
Kim J. 8'	Report

Umpires:
Melissa Trivic (AUS)
Karine Alves (FRA)

===== Final =====
26 November 2017
20:15

Netherlands	3–0	New Zealand
Jonker 24'; Verschoor 25'; Leurink 32'	Report

Umpires:
Michelle Joubert (RSA)
Sarah Wilson (SCO)

== Statistics ==
=== Final ranking ===
As per statistical convention in field hockey, matches decided in extra time are counted as wins and losses, while matches decided by penalty shoot-outs are counted as draws.

Pos	Grp	Team	Pld	W	D	L	GF	GA	GD	Pts	Final Standings
1st place, gold medalist(s)	A	Netherlands	6	6	0	0	18	0	+18	18	Gold Medal
2nd place, silver medalist(s)	A	New Zealand	6	2	0	4	5	13	−8	6	Silver Medal
3rd place, bronze medalist(s)	A	South Korea	6	2	2	2	7	10	−3	8	Bronze Medal
4	B	England	6	2	0	4	6	7	−1	6	Fourth place
5	B	Argentina	5	4	0	1	13	3	+10	12	Eliminated in Quarter-finals
6	B	Germany	5	2	1	2	9	11	−2	7	Eliminated in Quarter-finals
7	A	United States	5	2	1	2	11	10	+1	7	Eliminated in Quarter-finals
8	B	China	5	0	0	5	5	20	−15	0	Eliminated in Quarter-finals

Source: FIH

=== Awards ===
Top Goalscorer	Player of the Tournament	Goalkeeper of the Tournament	Young Player of the Tournament
(Argentina) Delfina Merino (Netherlands) Maartje Krekelaar	(New Zealand) Stacey Michelsen	(New Zealand) Sally Rutherford	(England) Lily Owsley

=== Goalscorers ===
5 goals

- (Argentina) Delfina Merino
- (Netherlands) Maartje Krekelaar

4 goals

- (Germany) Nike Lorenz

3 goals

- (England) Sophie Bray
- (Germany) Marie Mävers
- (Netherlands) Kelly Jonker

2 goals

- (Argentina) María José Granatto
- (China) Song Xiaoming
- (Netherlands) Laurien Leurink
- (Netherlands) Caia van Maasakker
- (Netherlands) Frédérique Matla
- (South Korea) Cho Hye-jin
- (South Korea) Park Seung-a
- (United States) Kathleen Sharkey
- (United States) Loren Shealy
- (United States) Taylor West
- (United States) Jill Witmer

1 goal

- (Argentina) Noel Barrionuevo
- (Argentina) Martina Cavallero
- (Argentina) Julia Gomes Fantasia
- (Argentina) Agustina Habif
- (Argentina) María Paula Ortiz
- (Argentina) Eugenia Trinchinetti
- (China) Gu Bingfeng
- (China) Wang Shumin
- (China) Zhong Mengling
- (England) Alex Danson
- (England) Sarah Haycroft
- (England) Hannah Martin
- (Germany) Teresa Martin-Pelegrina
- (Germany) Charlotte Stapenhorst
- (Netherlands) Margot van Geffen
- (Netherlands) Marloes Keetels
- (Netherlands) Maria Verschoor
- (Netherlands) Lidewij Welten
- (New Zealand) Erin Goad
- (New Zealand) Ella Gunson
- (New Zealand) Olivia Merry
- (New Zealand) Stacey Michelsen
- (New Zealand) Brooke Neal
- (South Korea) Jang Hee-sun
- (South Korea) Jang Soo-ji
- (South Korea) Kim Jong-eun
- (United States) Melissa González
- (United States) Erin Matson
- (United States) Erin McCrudden
