= Kathryn Lane =

English field hockey player

Personal information
- Born: 27 February 1995 (age 31) Derby, England
- Height: 1.93 m (6 ft 4 in)
- Weight: 65 kg (143 lb)

Sport
- Sport: Field hockey
- Position: Defender
- Club: Clifton Robinsons
National team
Years	Team	Caps	Goals
2017–2018	England	12	(0)
Medal record
Women's field hockey
Representing England
Commonwealth Games
Bronze medal – third place	2018 Gold Coast	Team

Kathryn Lane (born 27 February 1995) is an English international field hockey player who played as a defender for England.

She plays club hockey in the Women's England Hockey League Premier Division for Clifton Robinsons.

Lane has also played for Beeston and Leicester.
