= Maddie Hinch =

English field hockey player

Maddie Hinch OBE
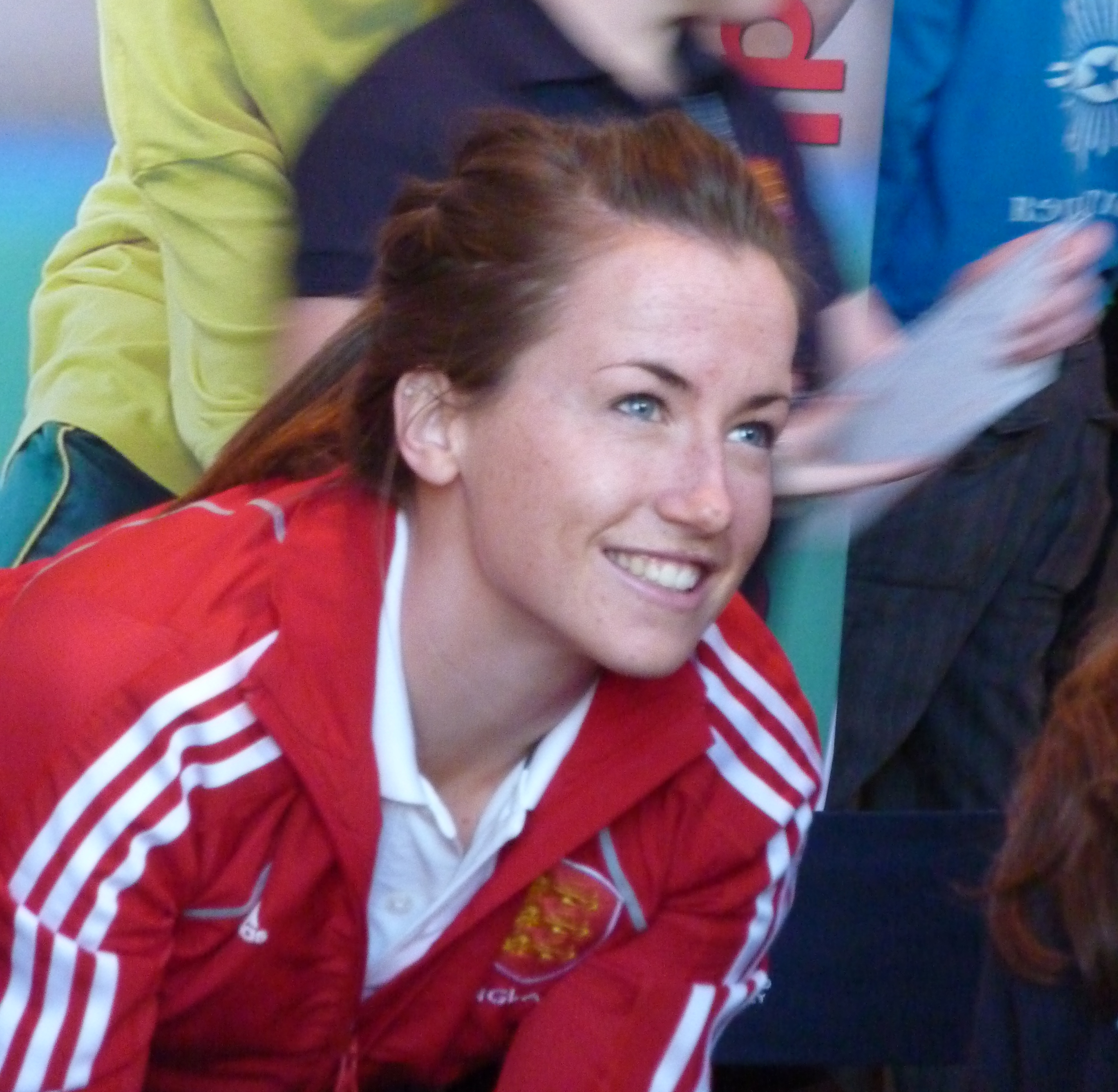
- Hinch in 2011

Personal information
- Full name: Madeleine Clare Hinch
- Born: 8 October 1988 (age 37) West Chiltington, England
- Height: 1.68 m (5 ft 6 in)

Sport
- Sport: Field hockey
- Position: Goalkeeper
- Club: HC Tilburg
National team
Years	Team	Caps	Goals
2008–2023	England	97	(0)
2011–2023	Great Britain	60	(0)
–	ENGLAND & GB TOTAL:	157	(0)
Medal record
Representing Great Britain
Olympic Games
Gold medal – first place	2016 Rio de Janeiro	Team
Bronze medal – third place	2020 Tokyo	Team
Representing England
European Championship
Silver medal – second place	2013 Boom
Gold medal – first place	2015 London
Bronze medal – third place	2017 Amstelveen
Commonwealth Games
Gold medal – first place	2022 Birmingham	Team
Silver medal – second place	2014 Glasgow	Team
Bronze medal – third place	2018 Gold Coast	Team
- Updated on 8 August 2022

Madeleine Clare Hinch (born 8 October 1988) is an English former field hockey player who played as a goalkeeper for Tilburg HC and England and Great Britain national teams.

== Club career ==
In 2021-22 she played club hockey in the Dutch Hoofdklasse for Tilburg Hockey Club.

Hinch has also played club hockey for Dutch club SCHC, Exmouth, Leicester and Holcombe.

Despite having announced her retirement from international hockey, Hinch continues to play for HC Tilburg in Holland.

== International career ==
She began playing hockey after a schoolteacher spotted her catching and diving talents in a game of rounders. Initially she was not overly keen on playing in goal and suffered a number of rejections as a youngster, but persevered and won a Youth Olympic Games medal. She made her full international debut in 2008, but narrowly missed out on a place in the Great Britain squad for the 2012 Summer Olympics. She soon took over as number one choice and won the silver medal for England at the 2014 Commonwealth Games in Glasgow.

In 2015, she enjoyed a breakthrough year, saving a penalty to ensure England won the EuroHockey Championships in London, then being nominated for FIH Goalkeeper of the Year.

In 2016, she played in her first Olympic games, surpassing 100 international appearances during the Rio 2016 Olympics. She won an Olympic gold medal in Rio in 2016, saving all four penalties in the final shoot-out against The Netherlands. Her outstanding performance was widely credited in the media as the deciding factor in the game's outcome.

She won a bronze medal at the 2018 Commonwealth Games. In September 2018, she decided to step aside from the national team, expressing her will to get back in the near future.

On 16 May 2019 it was announced that she had re-joined the England & GB Central Programme.

In 2022 she won a gold medal at the Commonwealth Games.

In March 2023, she announced her retirement from international hockey via social media.

Hinch was appointed Member of the Order of the British Empire (MBE) in the 2017 New Year Honours and Officer of the Order of the British Empire (OBE) in the 2024 New Year Honours, both for services to hockey.

== Education ==
Hinch was privately educated at the independent King's College, Taunton from 2002 to 2007. She has a degree in Sport & Exercise Science from Loughborough University. Hinch was awarded an honorary degree by her alma mater, Loughborough University in 2018.
