= Suzy Petty =

English field hockey player

Personal information
- Born: 9 April 1992 (age 34) Leeds, England
- Height: 1.63 m (5 ft 4 in)
- Weight: 61 kg (134 lb)

Sport
- Sport: Field hockey
- Position: Midfielder/Defender
- Club: Wimbledon
National team
Years	Team	Caps	Goals
2013–2019	England	18	(0)
2014–2019	Great Britain	13	(0)
Medal record
Women's field hockey
Representing England
Commonwealth Games
Bronze medal – third place	2018 Gold Coast	Team

Suzy Petty (born 9 April 1992) is an English field hockey player who plays as a midfielder or defender for England and Great Britain.

She currently plays club hockey in the Investec Women's Hockey League Conference East for Wimbledon.

Petty has also played for Beeston.
