= Amy Tennant =

English field hockey player

Personal information
- Born: 28 August 1994 (age 31) Davyhulme, England
- Height: 1.58 m (5 ft 2 in)
- Weight: 62 kg (137 lb)

Sport
- Sport: Field hockey
- Position: Goalkeeper
- Club: Reading
National team
Years	Team	Caps	Goals
2017–	England	11	(0)
2018–	Great Britain	13	(0)
–	ENGLAND & GB TOTAL:	24	(0)
Medal record
Women's field hockey
Representing England
Commonwealth Games
Bronze medal – third place	2018 Gold Coast	Team
European Championships
Bronze medal – third place	2017 Amsterdam
- Updated on 11 June 2021

Amy Tennant (born 28 August 1994) is an English field hockey player who plays as a goalkeeper for Reading and the England and Great Britain national teams.

== Club career ==
She plays club hockey in the Investec Women's Hockey League Conference West for Reading.

Tennant has also played for East Grinstead, German club Großflottbeker THGC in Hamburg Germany and Bowdon Hightown.
