= Laura Unsworth =

British field hockey player

Laura Roper MBE née Laura Unsworth
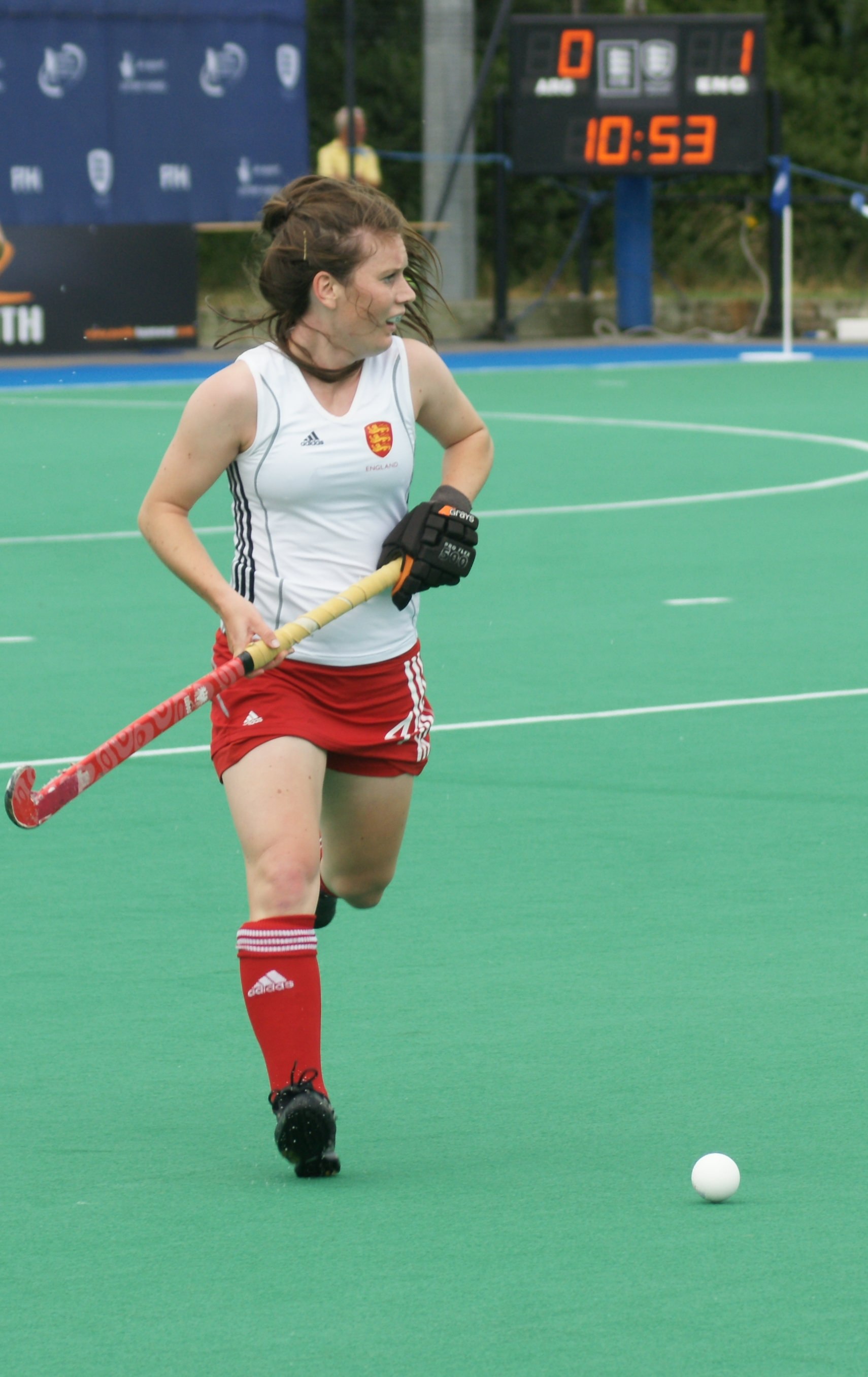
- Unsworth at the 2010 Champions Trophy

Personal information
- Full name: Laura Emma Roper
- Born: Laura Emma Unsworth; 8 March 1988 (age 38) Sutton Coldfield, West Midlands, England
- Height: 1.52 m (5 ft 0 in)
- Weight: 55 kg (121 lb)

Sport
- Sport: Field hockey
- Position: Midfielder or Defender
- Club: East Grinstead
Senior career
Years	Team	Caps	Goals
2003–2006	Sutton Coldfield HC	11	13
2007–2012	Loughborough Students	19	26
2013–2015	Holcombe	6	5
2015–present	East Grinstead	-	-
National team
Years	Team	Caps	Goals
2008–present	England	150	(7)
2009–present	Great Britain	134	(5)
–	ENGLAND & GB TOTAL:	284	(12)
Medal record
Women's field hockey
Representing Great Britain
Olympic Games
Gold medal – first place	2016 Rio de Janeiro	Team
Bronze medal – third place	2012 London	Team
Bronze medal – third place	2020 Tokyo	Team
Champions Trophy
Silver medal – second place	2012 Rosario
Representing England
Commonwealth Games
Gold medal – first place	2022 Birmingham	Team
Silver medal – second place	2014 Glasgow	Team
Bronze medal – third place	2010 Delhi	Team
Bronze medal – third place	2018 Gold Coast	Team
World Cup
Bronze medal – third place	2010 Rosario
Champions Trophy
Bronze medal – third place	2010 Nottingham
European Championship
Gold medal – first place	2015 London
Silver medal – second place	2013 Boom
Bronze medal – third place	2009 Amstelveen
Bronze medal – third place	2011 Monchengladbach
Bronze medal – third place	2017 Amstelveen
- Updated on 8 August 2022

Laura Emma Roper (née Unsworth, born 8 March 1988) is an English field hockey player who plays as a midfielder or defender for East Grinstead and the England and Great Britain national teams.

She is the first British field hockey player to win three Olympic medals.

Unsworth attended Coppice Primary School, Sutton Coldfield Grammar School for Girls and Loughborough University.

== Club career ==
Roper plays club hockey in the Women's England Hockey League Premier Division for East Grinstead.

She has also played for Holcombe, Loughborough Students and Sutton Coldfield.

== International career ==
Unsworth made her international debut in 2008 and was part of the Great Britain teams that won the gold medal at the 2016 Olympics and bronze medals at the 2012 and 2020 Summer Olympics.

Unsworth has also competed for England at the European Championships winning three bronze, one silver and a Gold medal, won in London in 2015. She also competed for England at the Commonwealth Games, securing bronze and silver at the 2010 and 2014.
