= Ellie Watton =

English field hockey player

Personal information
- Born: 10 June 1989 (age 37) Chesterfield, England
- Height: 1.68 m (5 ft 6 in)
- Weight: 64 kg (141 lb)

Sport
- Sport: Field hockey
- Position: Forward
- Club: Beeston
Youth career
- Years: Team
- 1994–2006: Matlock (Baileans)
Senior career
Years	Team	Caps	Goals
2006–2011	Cannock	-	-
2011–2014	Beeston	-	-
2014–2016	St Albans	-	-
2016–2018	Holcombe	-	-
2018–	Repton Hockey Club	-	-
National team
Years	Team	Caps	Goals
2013–2018	England	50	(8)
2014–2018	Great Britain	27	(5)
Medal record
Representing Great Britain
Olympic Games
Gold medal – first place	2016 Rio de Janeiro	Team
Representing England
European Championships
Bronze medal – third place	2017 Amsterdam
Commonwealth Games
Silver medal – second place	2014 Glasgow	Team
Bronze medal – third place	2018 Gold Coast	Team

Ellie Watton (born 10 June 1989) is a retired English international field hockey player who played as a forward for England and Great Britain. She made her first international appearance against South Africa on 4 February 2013. She retired from international hockey after competing in the 2018 FIH World Cup in London and has now resumed her teaching career, taking up a position at Rugby School in August 2018. She continues to coach and inspire the next generation of young hockey players

Since becoming a full-time athlete she played club hockey at St Albans, Holcombe & Beeston.

Watton grew up in Ashover, Derbyshire and was educated at Highfields School, Matlock and Repton School, Derbyshire. A qualified teacher, she taught and coached hockey at Oakham School until July 2014, and became a full-time athlete, based at Bisham Abbey. She is supported by the National Lottery Fund and sponsored by Osaka Hockey. She has competed for the England and Great Britain women's hockey teams, including the 2014 & 2018 World Cups, 2014 Commonwealth Games, 2014 Champions Trophy, 2015 World League Finals and was a member of the Rio 2016 Gold medal winning squad.

In the final year of her international career, she travelled to Brisbane to compete in the 2018 Commonwealth Games, returning with a Bronze Medal. Her last international appearance was for England in a home World Cup Quarter final - losing 2-0 to the eventual winners, Holland.
