= Susannah Townsend =

English field hockey player

Susannah Townsend MBE
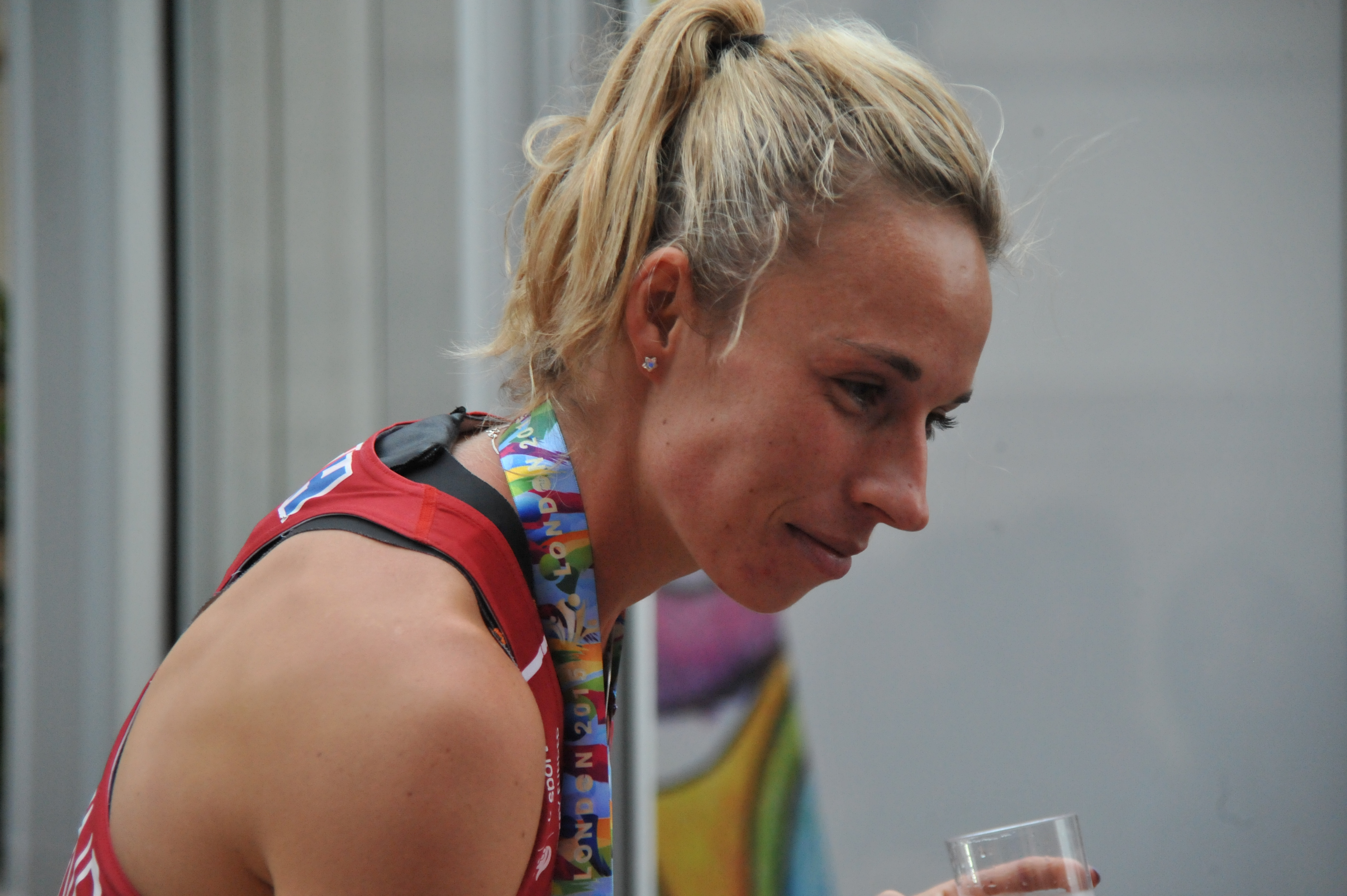
- Townsend in 2015

Personal information
- Born: 28 July 1989 (age 37) Blackheath, London, England
- Height: 1.68 m (5 ft 6 in)
- Weight: 61 kg (134 lb)

Sport
- Sport: Field hockey
- Position: Midfielder
- Club: Canterbury
National team
Years	Team	Caps	Goals
2008–2021	England	97	(9)
2008–2021	Great Britain	82	(4)
–	Total	179	(13)
Medal record
Representing Great Britain
Olympic Games
Gold medal – first place	2016 Rio de Janeiro	Team
Bronze medal – third place	2020 Tokyo	Team
Representing England
Commonwealth Games
Silver medal – second place	2014 Glasgow	Team
Bronze medal – third place	2018 Gold Coast	Team
European Championship
Gold medal – first place	2015 London
Bronze medal – third place	2017 Amstelveen
- Updated on 11 June 2021

Susannah Townsend (born 28 July 1989) is an English field hockey player who plays as a midfielder for Canterbury.

She was educated at Sutton Valence School, alongside Ashley Jackson, where together they each worked towards representing their country, England, in field hockey and is an Alumnus of the University of Kent.

Townsend is openly lesbian.

== Club career ==
For the 2020-21 season she has rejoined former club Canterbury who play in the Women's England Hockey League Division One South.

Townsend has also played club hockey in Germany, in the Feldhockey Bundesliga for Der Club an der Alster, in Belgium for Gantoise and in the Investec Women's Hockey League Premier Division for Canterbury and Reading

== International career ==
She competed for England in the women's hockey tournament at the 2014 Commonwealth Games where she won a silver medal. She announced her retirement from international play on 9 September 2021.
