= Jade Mayne =

South African field hockey player

Personal information
- Born: 11 May 1989 (age 37)
- Height: 1.62 m (5 ft 4 in)
- Weight: 65 kg (143 lb)

Sport
- Sport: Field hockey
- Position: Forward
National team
| Years | Team | Caps | Goals |
| – | South Africa | 146 | - |
Medal record
Africa Cup of Nations
| Gold medal – first place | 2013 Nairobi |

Jade Mayne (born 11 May 1989) is a South African field hockey player for the South African national team.

She participated at the 2018 Women's Hockey World Cup.
