= Sally Rutherford =

New Zealand field hockey player

Personal information
- Born: 5 June 1981 (age 45) Hamilton, New Zealand
- Height: 1.65 m (5 ft 5 in)
- Weight: 65 kg (143 lb)

Sport
- Sport: Field hockey
- Position: Goalkeeper
- Club: Midlands
National team
Years	Team	Caps	Goals
2009–	New Zealand	164	(0)
Medal record
Representing New Zealand
Women's field hockey
Commonwealth Games
Gold medal – first place	2018 Gold Coast	Team
Bronze medal – third place	2014 Glasgow	Team
Champions Trophy
Bronze medal – third place	2011 Amstelveen
Oceania Cup
Gold medal – first place	2019 Rockhampton
Silver medal – second place	2017 Sydney

Sally Rutherford (born 5 June 1981) is a New Zealand field hockey player. She has competed for the New Zealand women's national field hockey team (the Black Sticks Women) since 2009. She was the reserve goalkeeper for the team during the 2012 Summer Olympics.

Rutherford joined the Syracuse Orange field hockey team as a goalie coach in 2023.
