= Hollie Pearne-Webb =

English field hockey player (born 1990)

Hollie Webb MBE
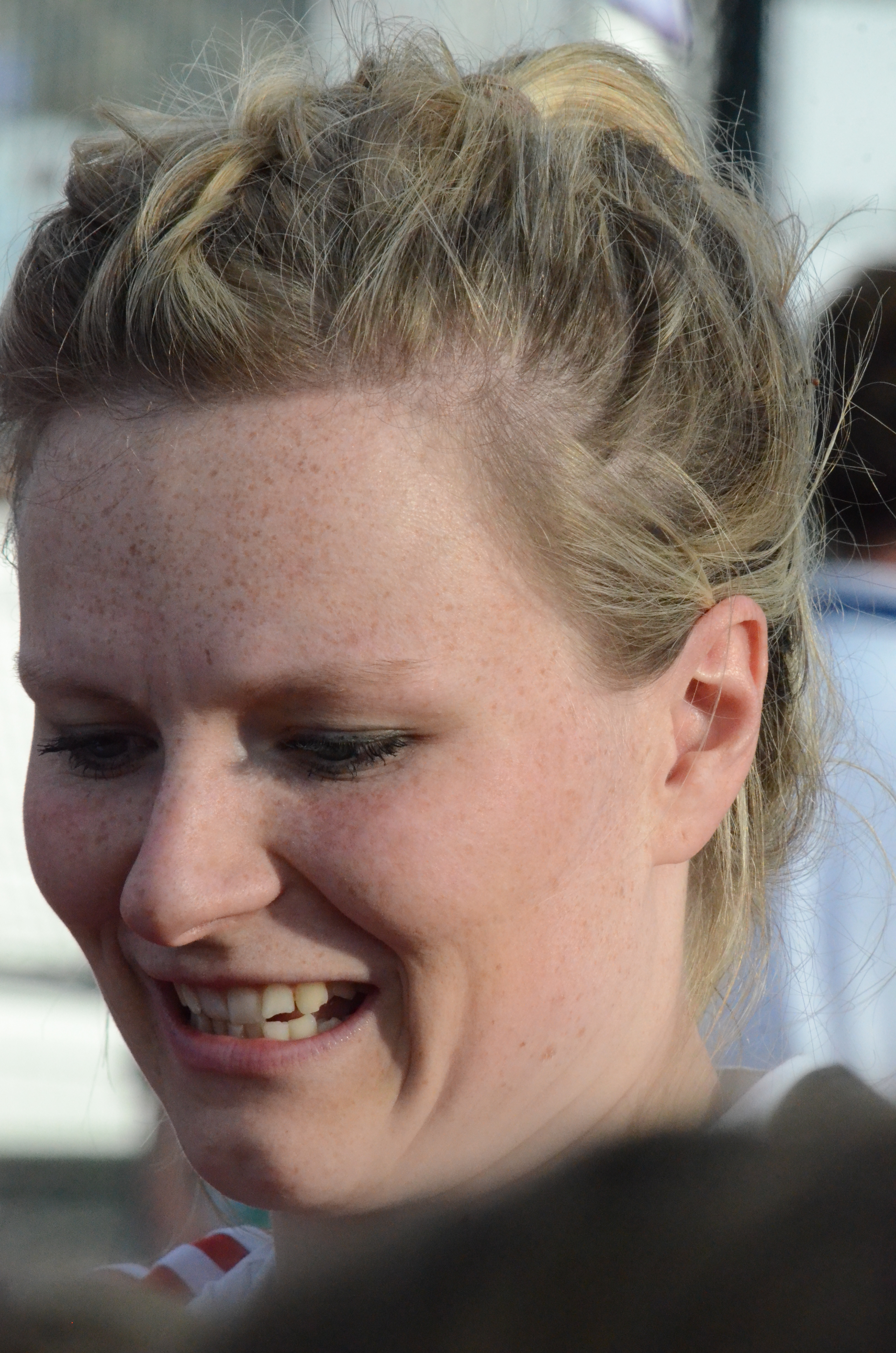
- Hollie Pearne-Webb in 2013

Personal information
- Full name: Hollie Pearne-Webb
- Born: 19 September 1990 (age 36) Belper, Derbyshire, England
- Height: 1.65 m (5 ft 5 in)
- Weight: 65 kg (143 lb)

Sport
- Sport: Field hockey
- Position: Defender
- Club: Wimbledon
Senior career
Years	Team	Caps	Goals
2005–2007	Belper	9	10
2007–2011	Cannock	8	10
2011–2013	Beeston	9	16
2013–2021	Surbiton	-	-
2021–2025	Wimbledon	-	-
National team
Years	Team	Caps	Goals
2013–2025	England	103	(5)
2014–2025	Great Britain	96	(4)
–	ENGLAND & GB TOTAL:	199	(9)
Medal record
Women's field hockey
Representing Great Britain
Olympic Games
Gold medal – first place	2016 Rio de Janeiro	Team
Bronze medal – third place	2020 Tokyo	Team
Representing England
Commonwealth Games
Gold medal – first place	2022 Birmingham	Team
Silver medal – second place	2014 Glasgow	Team
Bronze medal – third place	2018 Gold Coast	Team
European Championship
Gold medal – first place	2015 London
Silver medal – second place	2013 Boom
Bronze medal – third place	2017 Amstelveen
- Updated on 8 November 2021

Hollie Pearne-Webb (born 19 September 1990) is an English former field hockey player who played as a defender for Wimbledon and the England and Great Britain national teams.

She attended The Ecclesbourne School and the University of Sheffield

== Club career ==
Pearne-Webb plays club hockey in the Women's England Hockey League Premier Division for Wimbledon.

She has also played for Surbiton, Beeston, Cannock and Belper.

== International career ==
Pearne-Webb made her senior international debut for England v South Africa in the 2013 Women's Hockey Investec Cup, on 4 February 2013. One year later she made her senior international debut for Great Britain v New Zealand in a test match in San Diego, California, on 11 February 2014.

She competed for England in the women's hockey tournament at the 2014 Commonwealth Games where she won a silver medal. She scored the winning penalty in the 2016 Olympic final in Rio de Janeiro. This was the Great Britain women's national field hockey team's first gold medal at an Olympic Games.

Pearne-Webb was awarded the MBE in the 2017 New Year Honours List. On 7 March 2017 she was granted the Freedom of the Borough of Amber Valley.

She announced her retirement from hockey in May 2025.
