= Grace Balsdon =

English field hockey player (born 1993)

Personal information
- Born: 13 April 1993 (age 33) Canterbury, England
- Height: 1.74 m (5 ft 9 in)
- Weight: 67 kg (148 lb)

Sport
- Sport: Field hockey
- Position: Defender
- Club: East Grinstead Hockey Club
National team
Years	Team	Caps	Goals
2014–present	England	41	(3)
2017–present	Great Britain	48	(7)
–	ENGLAND & GB TOTAL:	89	(10)
Medal record
Women's field hockey
Representing Great Britain
Olympic Games
Bronze medal – third place	2020 Tokyo	Team
Representing England
Commonwealth Games
Gold medal – first place	2022 Birmingham	Team
Bronze medal – third place	2018 Gold Coast	Team
- Updated on 8 August 2022

Grace Balsdon (born 13 April 1993) is an English field hockey player who plays as a defender for East Grinstead Hockey Club and the England and Great Britain national teams.

== Club career ==
She plays club hockey in the Women's England Hockey League Premier Division for East Grinstead Hockey Club. She has also played for Hampstead & Westminster and Canterbury.

== International career ==
In 2016, Balsdon played defender for the University of Maryland field hockey team and was named the Big Ten Defensive Player of the Year, National Field Hockey Coaches Association All-American, All-Big Ten First Team, and three-time Big Ten Defensive Player of the Week.

In the 2020 Tokyo Summer Olympics, Balsdon scored the game winning goal for Great Britain to win the bronze medal in women's field hockey.
