= Pippa Hayward =

New Zealand field hockey player

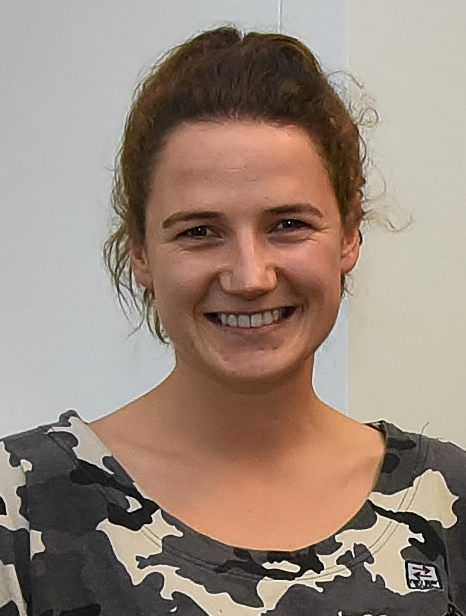
- Hayward in 2017

Personal information
- Born: 23 May 1990 (age 36) Dunedin, New Zealand
- Height: 1.76 m (5 ft 9 in)
- Weight: 69 kg (152 lb)

Sport
- Country: New Zealand
- Sport: Field hockey
Medal record
Representing New Zealand
Women's Hockey
Commonwealth Games
Gold medal – first place	2018 Gold Coast	Team competition

Pippa Hayward (born 23 May 1990) is a New Zealand field hockey player who has represented her country.

Hayward competed in the 2015 Women's FIH Hockey World League Final, 2015 Oceania Cup and represented New Zealand at the 2016 Summer Olympics.

Hayward studied law and arts at the University of Auckland, and was admitted to the bar in 2018. She is a member of the Sports Tribunal of New Zealand.
