= Hannah French =

English field hockey player

Personal information
- Born: Hannah Martin; 30 December 1994 (age 31) Ipswich, England
- Height: 1.62 m (5 ft 4 in)
- Weight: 60 kg (132 lb)

Sport
- Sport: Field hockey
- Position: Midfielder or Forward
- Club: THC Hurley
Senior career
Years	Team	Caps	Goals
–	Ipswich	-	-
–	University of Birmingham	-	-
2017–2021	Surbiton	-	-
2021–present	THC Hurley	-	-
National team
Years	Team	Caps	Goals
2017–present	England		-
2017–present	Great Britain		-
–	England & GB Total:	111	(33)
Medal record
Women's field hockey
Representing United Kingdom
Olympic Games
Bronze medal – third place	2020 Tokyo	Team
Representing England
Commonwealth Games
Gold medal – first place	2022 Birmingham	Team
Bronze medal – third place	2018 Gold Coast	Team
European Championships
Bronze medal – third place	2017 Amsterdam
- Updated on 8 August 2022

Hannah French (née Martin, born 30 December 1994) is an English field hockey player who plays as a midfielder or forward for Surbiton and the England and Great Britain national teams.

She was educated at Ipswich School. Her brother is Harry Martin who plays for the England and Great Britain national teams.

== Club career ==
Martin will play club hockey in the 2021-22 season, in the Dutch Hoofdklasse for Hurley.

She has been playing in the Women's England Hockey League Premier Division for Surbiton. She has also played for University of Birmingham and Ipswich.

== International career ==
Martin made her senior International debut against South Africa in February 2017. She has also played for England U-16 (2009–10), U-18 (2011–12) and U-21 (from 2012 to 2016).
