= Alison Howie =

Scottish field hockey player

Personal information
- Born: 3 July 1991 (age 35) Glasgow

Sport
- Sport: Field hockey
- Position: Midfielder
National team
Years	Team	Caps	Goals
2013–2018	Scotland		-

Alison Howie (born 3 July 1991) is a Scottish female field hockey player who plays as a midfielder for the Scotland women's national field hockey team. She has represented Scotland in few international competitions including the 2013 Women's EuroHockey Nations Championship, 2015 Women's EuroHockey Nations Championship, 2017 Women's EuroHockey Nations Championship, and 2018 Commonwealth Games.
