= Renee Taylor (field hockey) =

Australian field hockey player

Personal information
- Born: 28 September 1996 (age 30) Everton Park, Queensland, Australia
- Height: 1.72 m (5 ft 8 in)
- Weight: 63 kg (139 lb)

Sport
- Sport: Field hockey
- Position: Defender
- Club: Queensland Scorchers
National team
Years	Team	Caps	Goals
2015–2024	Australia	138	(16)
Medal record
Women's field hockey
Representing Australia
World Cup
Bronze medal – third place	2022 Terrassa/Amstelveen
Commonwealth Games
Silver medal – second place	2018 Gold Coast	Team
Silver medal – second place	2022 Birmingham	Team
FIH Pro League
Silver medal – second place	2019
Bronze medal – third place	2022–23
Oceania Cup
Gold medal – first place	2017 Sydney
Gold medal – first place	2023 Whangarei
Silver medal – second place	2019 Rockhampton
Junior World Cup
Bronze medal – third place	2016 Santiago

Renee Taylor (born 28 September 1996) is an Australian field hockey player.

Taylor was born in Everton Park, Queensland and made her senior international debut in a test series against China in April 2015.

Taylor was part of the Australian women's junior national team, 'The Jillaroos', that won bronze at the 2016 Hockey Junior World Cup in Chile.

Taylor qualified for the Tokyo 2020 Olympics. She was part of the Hockeyroos Olympics squad. The Hockeyroos lost 1–0 to India in the quarterfinals and therefore were not in medal contention.

== International goals ==
Scores and results list Australia's goal tally first.

No.	Date	Venue	Opponent	Score	Result	Competition
1.	12 October 2017	Sydney, Australia	Papua New Guinea	1–0	23–0	2017 Women's Oceania Cup
2.	12 October 2017	Sydney, Australia	Papua New Guinea	23–0	23–0	2017 Women's Oceania Cup
3.	18 November 2017	Adelaide, Australia	Japan	5–1	8–1	Test match
4.	5 February 2018	Perth, Australia	China	2–0	5–0	Test match
5.	21 May 2018	Cromwell, New Zealand	Japan	4–1	4–1	2018 Women's Tri-Nations Hockey Tournament
6.	7 September 2019	Rockhampton, Australia	New Zealand	3–2	3–2	2019 Women's Oceania Cup
7.	13 July 2022	Terrassa, Spain	Spain	1–0	2–0	2022 Women's FIH Hockey World Cup
8.	13 July 2022	Terrassa, Spain	Spain	2–0	2–0	2022 Women's FIH Hockey World Cup
9.	31 July 2022	Birmingham, England	South Africa	2–0	5–0	2022 Commonwealth Games
10.	28 February 2023	Hobart, Australia	Argentina	2–0	2–0	2022–23 Women's FIH Pro League
11.	26 March 2023	Perth, Australia	China	1–0	3–4	Test match
12.	26 March 2023	Perth, Australia	China	2–2	3–4	Test match
13.	28 April 2023	Christchurch, New Zealand	Great Britain	2–1	3–1	2022–23 Women's FIH Pro League
14.	31 July 2024	Paris, France	United States	1–0	3–0	2024 Summer Olympics
