= Stephanie Kershaw =

Australian field hockey player

Personal information
- Full name: Stephanie Anna Kershaw
- Born: 19 April 1995 (age 31) Townsville, Australia
- Height: 168 cm (5 ft 6 in)
- Weight: 65 kg (143 lb)

Sport
- Sport: Field hockey
- Position: Forward
- Club: Brisbane Blaze
National team
Years	Team	Caps	Goals
2015–	Australia	131	(26)
Medal record
Women's field hockey
Representing Australia
World Cup
Bronze medal – third place	2022 Terrassa/Amstelveen
FIH Pro League
Bronze medal – third place	2022–23
Commonwealth Games
Silver medal – second place	2018 Gold Coast	Team
Silver medal – second place	2022 Birmingham	Team
Champions Trophy
Silver medal – second place	2018 Changzhou
Oceania Cup
Gold medal – first place	2015 Stratford
Gold medal – first place	2017 Sydney
Gold medal – first place	2023 Whangārei

Stephanie Anna Kershaw (born 19 April 1995) is an Australian field hockey player.

== Personal life ==
Kershaw was born in Townsville, Queensland. She plays hockey for her home state in the Australian Hockey League, as part of the Queensland Scorchers team.

== Career ==
=== Senior national team ===
Kershaw made her senior international debut in a test series against Korea in September 2015. Following her debut in September, Kershaw was part of the Australian team that won the 2015 Oceania Cup in October.

In 2018, Kershaw was named in the Hockeyroos team to compete at the 2018 Commonwealth Games. The team finished second, winning a silver medal after losing to New Zealand 4–1 in the final. Kershaw was also a member of the Australian team at the 2018 World Cup, where the team finished in fourth place.

Again in 2018, Kershaw also represented Australia at the Sompo Cup in Japan, and the Champions Trophy in China.

Kershaw qualified for the Tokyo 2020 Olympics. She was part of the Hockeyroos Olympics squad. The Hockeyroos lost 1–0 to India in the quarterfinals and therefore were not in medal contention.

=== International goals ===
Goal	Date	Location	Opponent	Score	Result	Competition	Ref.
1	6 September 2015	Perth Hockey Stadium, Perth, Australia	South Korea	3–0	5–1	Test Match	
2	22 October 2015	TET MultiSports Centre, Stratford, New Zealand	Samoa	4–0	25–0	2015 Oceania Cup	
3	12 November 2017	State Netball and Hockey Centre, Melbourne, Australia	United States	5–0	5–0	2017 Int. Festival of Hockey	
4	23 May 2018	Central Otago Sports Club, Cromwell, New Zealand	New Zealand	3–0	3–0	2018 Tri-Nations Tournament	
5	13 September 2018	Ritsumeikan University, Osaka, Japan	South Korea	1–0	3–1	2018 SOMPO Cup	
6	13 September 2018	Ritsumeikan University, Osaka, Japan	South Korea	3–1	3–1	2018 SOMPO Cup	
7	1 February 2020	Sydney Olympic Park, Sydney, Australia	Great Britain	1–1	2–1	2020–21 FIH Pro League	
8	28 May 2021	Massey University, Palmerston North, New Zealand	New Zealand	1–2	2–2	2021 Trans–Tasman Series	
9	1 June 2021	Massey University, Palmerston North, New Zealand	New Zealand	1–0	3–1	2021 Trans–Tasman Series	
10	26 July 2021	Oi Hockey Stadium, Tokyo, Japan	China	5–0	6–0	2020 Summer Olympics	
11	17 July 2022	Estadi Olímpic de Terrassa, Terrassa, Spain	Germany	1–1	2–1	2022 FIH World Cup	
12	17 July 2022	Estadi Olímpic de Terrassa, Terrassa, Spain	Germany	2–1	2–1	2022 FIH World Cup	
13	30 July 2022	University of Birmingham, Birmingham, England	Kenya	4–0	8–0	XXII Commonwealth Games	
14	31 July 2022	University of Birmingham, Birmingham, England	South Africa	3–0	5–0	XXII Commonwealth Games	
