= Kelsey Smith =

New Zealand field hockey player

Personal information
- Born: 11 August 1994 (age 31) Nelson, New Zealand
- Height: 1.63 m (5 ft 4 in)
- Weight: 58 kg (128 lb)

Sport
- Sport: Field hockey
- Position: Forward
- Club: Capital
National team
Years	Team	Caps	Goals
2015–	New Zealand	79	-
Medal record
Representing New Zealand
Women's hockey
Commonwealth Games
Gold medal – first place	2018 Gold Coast	Team
Oceania Cup
Silver medal – second place	2017 Sydney
Silver medal – second place	2023 Whangārei

Kelsey Smith (born 11 August 1994) is a New Zealand field hockey player who plays for the national team.

Smith was born on 11 August 1994 in Nelson. She attended Waimea College and now studies tourism management at Victoria University in Wellington. She played her first game for the national team in 2015 against Argentina. In July 2016, she was confirmed for New Zealand's Olympic team.

As well as appearing in the senior national team, Smith appeared for the Junior Black Sticks in 2015 during an Invitational Tournament in Breda.
