= Madison Doar =

New Zealand field hockey player (born 1999)

Personal information
- Born: 29 June 1999 (age 27) Whangārei, New Zealand
- Height: 1.70 m (5 ft 7 in)
- Weight: 58 kg (128 lb)

Sport
- Sport: Field hockey
- Position: Forward
- Club: Auckland
National team
Years	Team	Caps	Goals
2017–	New Zealand	32	(6)
Medal record
Women's field hockey
Representing New Zealand
Commonwealth Games
Gold medal – first place	2018 Gold Coast	Team
Hockey World League
Silver medal – second place	2016–17 Auckland	Team

Madison Doar, born on 29 June 1999 in Whangārei, New Zealand, is a field hockey player who plays as a forward in the New Zealand national team as the Black Sticks Women. She has competed at major international tournaments, including the Commonwealth Games, the Women's Hockey World Cup, and FIH Pro League.
