= Amy Robinson (field hockey) =

New Zealand field hockey player

Personal information
- Born: 19 February 1996 (age 30) Tauranga, New Zealand
- Height: 1.75 m (5 ft 9 in)
- Weight: 62 kg (137 lb)

Sport
- Sport: Field hockey
- Position: Forward
- Club: Midlands
National team
Years	Team	Caps	Goals
–	New Zealand	77	-
Medal record
Representing New Zealand
Women's field hockey
Commonwealth Games
Gold medal – first place	2018 Gold Coast	Team
Oceania Cup
Gold medal – first place	2019 Rockhampton
Silver medal – second place	2017 Sydney

Amy Robinson (born 19 February 1996) is a two-sport athlete for New Zealand. She plays field hockey for New Zealand and is also a National Field and Track Athlete.

== Early life and education ==
Amy Robinson was born in Tauranga, New Zealand. Robinson started participating in athletics at age 4. She started playing field hockey in primary school. Growing up, Robinson played for Tauranga Girls' College and later junior Tauranga alongside future Black Sticks teammate Frances Davies. While in college, Robinson continued to participate in athletics, field hockey, and volleyball. She earned a bachelor's degree in Sport and Recreation.

== Career ==
In field hockey, Robinson plays the position of striker. She was on New Zealand's field hockey team for the 2014 Summer Youth Olympics. She was also on New Zealand's Under-21 team for the field hockey 2016 Junior World Cup. She was added to the New Zealand women's national field hockey team, known as the Black Sticks, in late 2016. Robinson scored a goal in her first game for the New Zealand women's national field hockey team. She participated at the 2020 Women's FIH Pro League. She also plays field hockey for the Midlands team.

In 2016, Robinson was awarded the Bay of Plenty Junior Sportswoman of the Year. Outside of hockey, Robinson teaches at Tauranga Intermediate. Robinson's primary sport is field hockey, although she also competes in athletics and volleyball. In 2013 she set a New Zealand Under-17 record in 300 m hurdles. She also played for New Zealand's Under-17 beach volleyball team and Under-18 volleyball team.
