= Ella Gunson =

New Zealand field hockey player

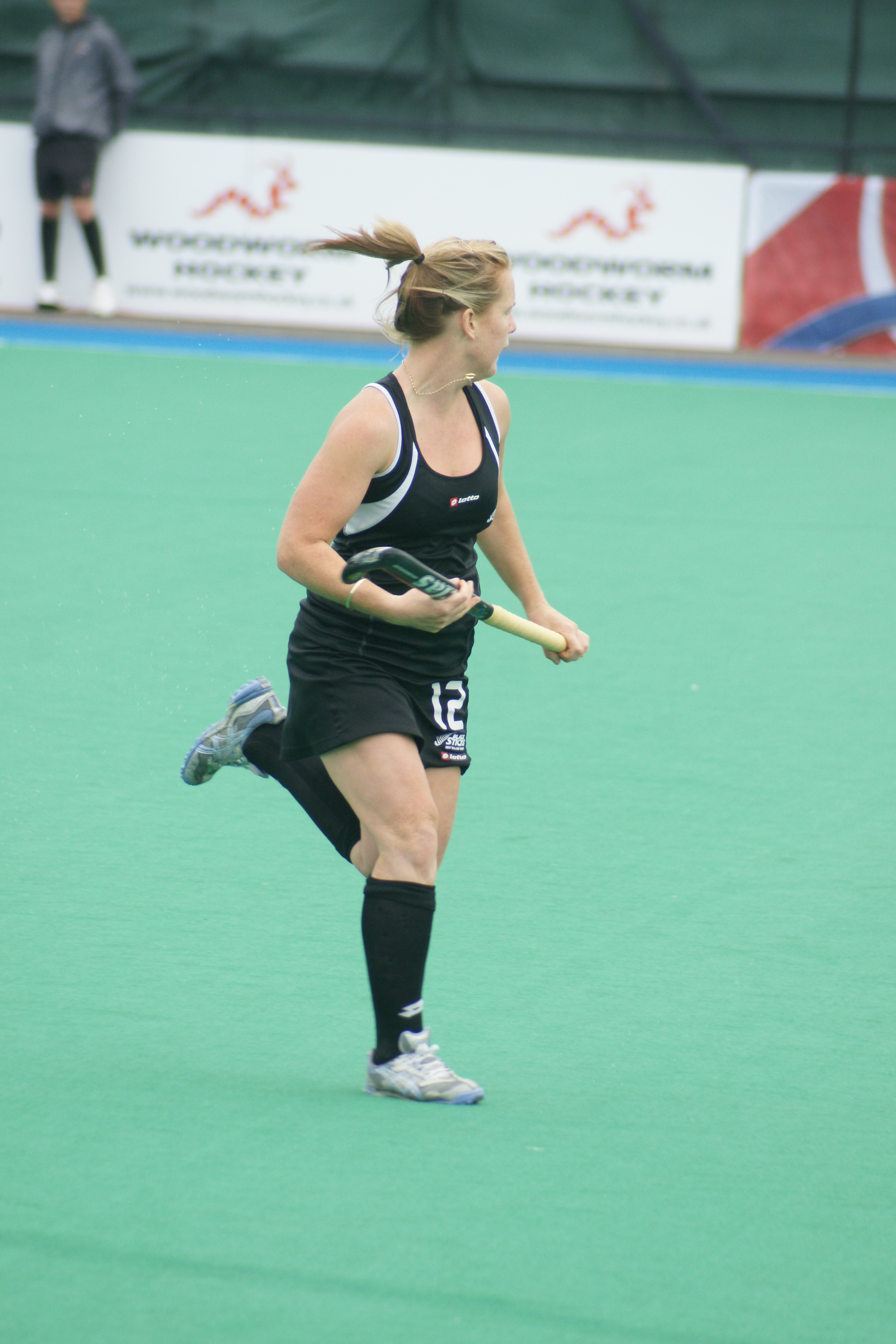

Personal information
- Born: 9 July 1989 (age 37) Whangārei, New Zealand
- Height: 1.62 m (5 ft 4 in)
- Weight: 62 kg (137 lb)

Sport
- Sport: Field hockey
- Position: Midfielder
- Club: Northland
Senior career
Years	Team	Caps	Goals
–	Northland	-	-
National team
Years	Team	Caps	Goals
2009–	New Zealand	191	-
Medal record
Representing New Zealand
Women's field hockey
Commonwealth Games
Gold medal – first place	2018 Gold Coast	Team
Silver medal – second place	2010 Delhi	Team
Oceania Cup
Gold medal – first place	2019 Rockhampton
Champions Trophy
Bronze medal – third place	2011 Amstelveen
Champions Challenge
Gold medal – first place	2009 Cape Town

Elizabeth "Ella" Gunson (born 9 July 1989) is a New Zealand field hockey player.

She was first selected for the Black Sticks Women in June 2009, along with ten other players as the Black Sticks squad was overhauled following its last place finish at the 2008 Beijing Olympics. Gunson has competed for the New Zealand women's national field hockey team (the Black Sticks Women) since 2009, including at the 2010 Commonwealth Games and the 2012 Summer Olympics. She participated at the 2020 Women's FIH Pro League.
