= Brooke Neal =

New Zealand field hockey player

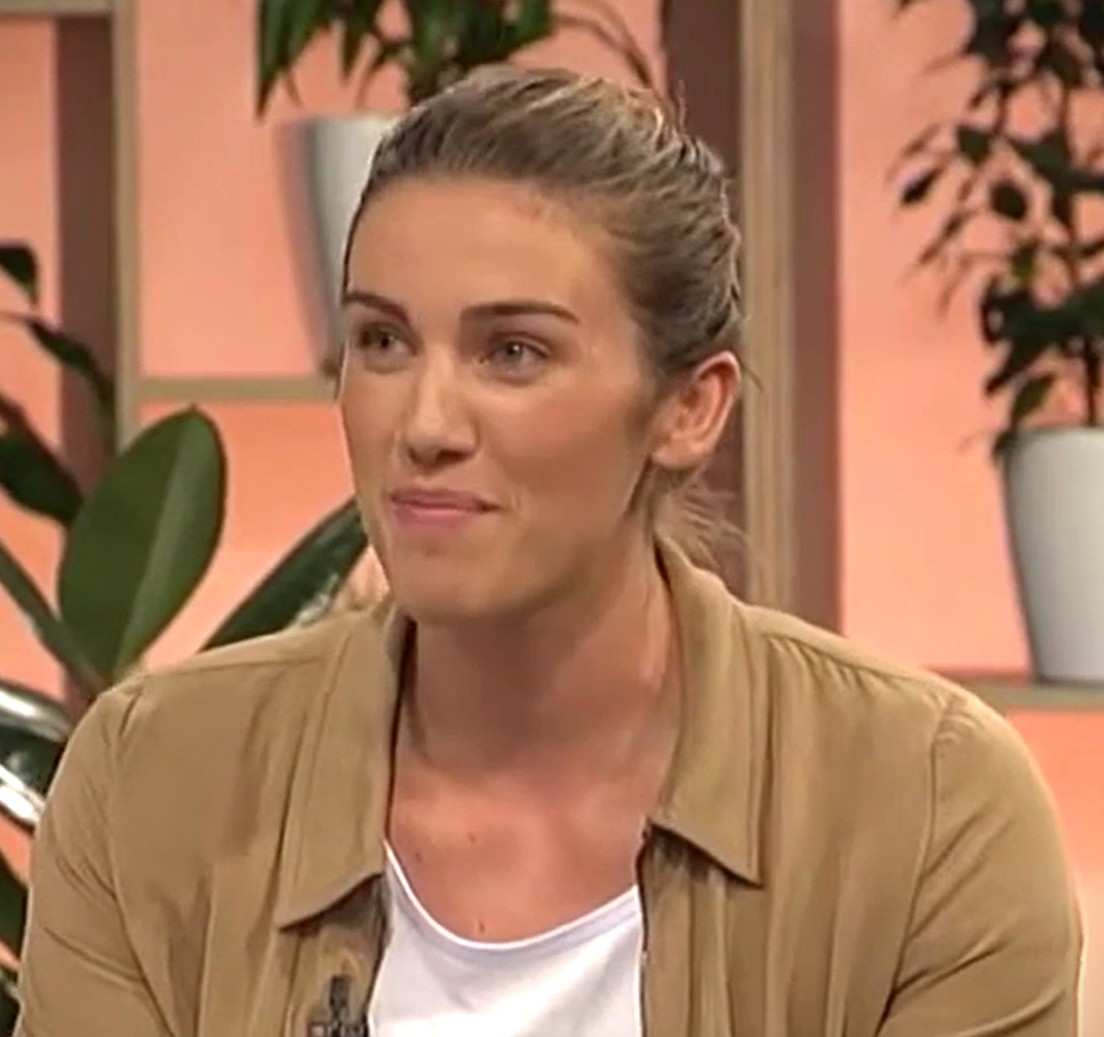
- Neal in 2017

Personal information
- Born: 4 July 1992 (age 34) Whangārei, New Zealand
- Height: 1.80 m (5 ft 11 in)
- Weight: 71 kg (157 lb)

Sport
- Sport: Field hockey
- Position: Defender
- Club: Northland
National team
| Years | Team | Caps | Goals |
| – | New Zealand | 147 | - |
Medal record
Women's field hockey
Representing New Zealand
Commonwealth Games
| Gold medal – first place | 2018 Gold Coast | Team |
Oceania Cup
| Gold medal – first place | 2019 Rockhampton |
| Silver medal – second place | 2017 Sydney |

Brooke Neal (married name Hayde, born 4 July 1992) is a New Zealand field hockey player who has played for the New Zealand national team.

== Personal life ==
Neal attended Whangārei Girls' High School from 2006 to 2010 before studying communications at the University of Waikato. She graduated in 2013 as a Sir Edmund Hillary Scholar

Neal's brother, Shay, also represents New Zealand at hockey and attended the Rio Olympics. Their journey can be followed here

Currently, Neal is an ambassador for the New Zealand Olympic Committee and has been visiting schools talking about her olympic experience. She has also entered the corporate speaking circuit, where shares the lessons learned throughout her journey.

== Playing career ==
Neal represented New Zealand at the 2013 Women's Hockey Junior World Cup, before making her national debut that same year.

She has competed in two World League finals, the most recent in 2015 where the team came second, Champions Trophy in 2016, and she represented New Zealand at the 2016 Summer Olympics where her team came fourth. She participated at the 2020 Women's FIH Pro League.
