= Shiloh Gloyn =

New Zealand field hockey player

Personal information
- Born: 6 November 1989 (age 36) Taupō, New Zealand
- Height: 1.65 m (5 ft 5 in)
- Weight: 62 kg (137 lb)

Sport
- Sport: Field hockey
- Position: Midfielder
- Club: Midlands
National team
Years	Team	Caps	Goals
–	New Zealand	68	-

Shiloh Gloyn (born 6 November 1989) is a New Zealand field hockey player and has played over 50 tests for the New Zealand national team.

She participated at the 2018 Women's Hockey World Cup held in London and was a member of the New Zealand hockey squad which won gold at the Gold Coast 2018 Commonwealth Games.
