= Hockey at the 2018 Commonwealth Games – Women's tournament =

2018 Commonwealth Games – Women's hockey
Tournament details
- Host country: Australia
- City: Gold Coast
- Dates: 5 – 14 April 2018
- Teams: 10
- Venue: Gold Coast Hockey Centre

Final positions
- Champions: New Zealand (1st title)
- Runner-up: Australia
- Third place: England

Tournament statistics
- Matches played: 27
- Goals scored: 92 (3.41 per match)
- Top scorer(s): (England) Sophie Bray (Australia) Jodie Kenny (5 goals)

The women's hockey event at the 2018 Commonwealth Games was held at the Gold Coast Hockey Centre from 5 to 14 April 2018.

== Umpires ==
Twelve umpires for the women's event were appointed by the International Hockey Federation.

- Nur Hafizah Azman (MAS)
- Jo Cumming (NZL)
- Durga Devi (IND)
- Ayanna McClean (TTO)
- Aleisha NeUmann (AUS)
- Lelia Sacre (CAN)
- Emma Shelbourn (ENG)
- Cookie Tan (SGP)
- Wanri Venter (RSA)
- Sarah Wilson (SCO)
- Cathy Wright (WAL)
- Aleesha Unka (NZL)

== Results ==
All times are local (UTC+10)

=== Preliminary round ===
==== Pool A ====
Pos	Team	Pld	W	D	L	GF	GA	GD	Pts	Qualification
1	England	4	3	0	1	11	3	+8	9	Advance to Semi-finals
2	India	4	3	0	1	9	5	+4	9	Advance to Semi-finals
3	South Africa	4	1	1	2	3	4	−1	4	5th–6th place match
4	Malaysia	4	1	1	2	3	8	−5	4	7th–8th place match
5	Wales	4	1	0	3	4	10	−6	3	9th–10th place match

Source: FIH
Rules for classification: 1) points; 2) number of wins; 3) goal difference; 4) goals scored; 5) head-to-head results.

5 April 2018
09:30

India	2–3	Wales
Rampal 34'; Pradhan 41'	Report	Daley 7'; French 26'; Marke-Jones 57'

Umpires:
Aleisha Neumann (AUS)
Jo Cumming (NZL)

5 April 2018
14:30

England	2–0	South Africa
Balsdon 11'; Townsend 20'	Report

Umpires:
Sarah Wilson (GBR)
Nur Hafizah Azman (MAS)

6 April 2018
14:30

India	4–1	Malaysia
G. Kaur 6', 39'; Rampal 56'; Lalremsiami 59'	Report	Nuraini 38'

Umpires:
Emma Shelbourn (GBR)
Cookie Tan (SGP)

6 April 2018
19:30

England	5–1	Wales
Ansley 23'; Townsend 25'; Martin 48'; Bray 53'; Balsdon 60'	Report	Laity 34'

Umpires:
Lelia Sacre (CAN)
Ayanna McClean (TTO)

7 April 2018
19:30

South Africa	1–1	Malaysia
Mayne 47'	Report	Nuraslinda 39'

Umpires:
Catherine Wright (WAL)
Lelia Sacre (CAN)

8 April 2018
09:30

England	1–2	India
Danson 1'	Report	Navn. Kaur 42'; G. Kaur 48'

Umpires:
Aleisha Neumann (AUS)
Cookie Tan (SGP)

9 April 2018
14:30

South Africa	2–0	Wales
Manuel 25'; Mayne 41'	Report

Umpires:
Emma Shelbourn (ENG)
Jo Cumming (NZL)

9 April 2018
19:30

England	3–0	Malaysia
Watton 7'; Martin 35'; Bray 53'	Report

Umpires:
Lelia Sacre (CAN)
Wanri Venter (RSA)

10 April 2018
19:30

India	1–0	South Africa
Rampal 47'	Report

Umpires:
Sarah Wilson (SCO)
Catherine Wright (WAL)

11 April 2018
09:30

Malaysia	1–0	Wales
Hanis 23'	Report

Umpires:
Ayanna McClean (TTO)
Cookie Tan (SGP)

==== Pool B ====
Pos	Team	Pld	W	D	L	GF	GA	GD	Pts	Qualification
1	Australia (H)	4	3	1	0	8	0	+8	10	Advance to Semi-finals
2	New Zealand	4	2	2	0	18	1	+17	8	Advance to Semi-finals
3	Canada	4	1	2	1	5	2	+3	5	5th–6th place match
4	Scotland	4	1	1	2	6	8	−2	4	7th–8th place match
5	Ghana	4	0	0	4	1	27	−26	0	9th–10th place match

Source: FIH
Rules for classification: 1) points; 2) number of wins; 3) goal difference; 4) goals scored; 5) head-to-head results.
(H) Hosts

5 April 2018
11:30

Scotland	1–6	New Zealand
Howie 53'	Report	Smith 10'; Neal 12'; Gloyn 18', 48'; Keddell 18', 45'

Umpires:
Ayanna McClean (USA)
Cookie Tan (SGP)

5 April 2018
16:30

Australia	1–0	Canada
Kenny 25'	Report

Umpires:
Emma Shelbourn (GBR)
Wanri Venter (RSA)

6 April 2018
16:30

New Zealand	12–0	Ghana
Doar 10', 50', 53'; Smith 14'; Charlton 16'; Gloyn 28'; Michelsen 33'; Merry 35'; Harrison 43'; McLaren 49', 59'; Robinson 51'	Report

Umpires:
Catherine Wright (GBR)
Aleisha Neumann (AUS)

6 April 2018
21:30

Canada	0–0	Scotland
	Report

Umpires:
Durga Devi (IND)
Jo Cumming (NZL)

7 April 2018
21:30

Australia	5–0	Ghana
Bone 2'; Kenny 7', 30'; Claxton 14'; Peris 41'	Report

Umpires:
Sarah Wilson (SCO)
Durgi Devi (IND)

8 April 2018
11:30

New Zealand	0–0	Canada
	Report

Umpires:
Wanri Venter (RSA)
Nur Hafiza Azman (MAS)

9 April 2018
16:30

Scotland	5–0	Ghana
Collins 11'; K. Robertson 12'; Brown 37'; Brodie 45'; Alexander-Lloyd 47'	Report

Umpires:
Nur Hafizah Azman (MAS)
Catherine Wright (WAL)

9 April 2018
21:30

Australia	0–0	New Zealand
	Report

Umpires:
Sarah Wilson (SCO)
Ayanna McClean (TTO)

10 April 2018
21:30

Australia	2–0	Scotland
Kenny 12'; Stewart 41'	Report

Umpires:
Durgi Devi (IND)
Lelia Sacre (CAN)

11 April 2018
11:30

Canada	5–1	Ghana
Stairs 12', 54'; Secco 29'; Hennig 34'; Wright 52'	Report	Amoako 33'

Umpires:
Aleisha Neumann (AUS)
Nur Hafizah Azman (MAS)

=== Classification matches ===
==== Fifth to tenth place classification ====
===== Ninth and tenth place =====
12 April 2018
13:30

Wales	1–1	Ghana
Evans 53'	Report	Boakye 44'
Penalties
French (penalty shoot-out scored); Jones (penalty shoot-out scored); Evans (penalty shoot-out missed)	2–0	(penalty shoot-out missed) Umaru; (penalty shoot-out missed) Amoako; (penalty shoot-out missed) Opoku; (penalty shoot-out missed) Afriyie

Umpires:
Durga Devi (IND)
Emma Shelbourn (ENG)

===== Seventh and eighth place =====
12 April 2018
15:45

Malaysia	2–4	Scotland
Fatin 31'; Nuraini 40'	Report	Brown 5'; Brodie 22', 27'; Lanigan 51'

Umpires:
Jo Cumming (NZL)
Wanri Venter (RSA)

===== Fifth and sixth place =====
13 April 2018
14:00

South Africa	1–3	Canada
Manuel 55'	Report	Johnston 10'; Secco 15'; Sourisseau 48'

Umpires:
Catherine Wright (WAL)
Cookie Tan (SGP)

==== First to fourth place classification ====
Semi-finals
12 April 2018
England	0 (1)
New Zealand (p.s.o)	0 (2)
12 April 2018
Australia	1
India	0

Gold medal match
14 April 2018
New Zealand	4
Australia	1
Bronze medal match
14 April 2018
England	6
India	0

===== Semi-finals =====
12 April 2018
19:00

England	0–0	New Zealand
	Report
Penalties
Danson (penalty shoot-out missed); Bray (penalty shoot-out missed); Martin (penalty shoot-out scored); Toman (penalty shoot-out missed); Pearne-Webb (penalty shoot-out missed)	1–2	(penalty shoot-out missed) Charlton; (penalty shoot-out missed) Thompson; (penalty shoot-out scored) Harrison; (penalty shoot-out missed) Gunson; (penalty shoot-out scored) Michelsen

Umpires:
Sarah Wilson (SCO)
Aleisha Neumann (AUS)

12 April 2018
21:15

Australia	1–0	India
Stewart 37'	Report

Umpires:
Ayanna McClean (TTO)
Lelia Sacre (CAN)

===== Bronze medal match =====
14 April 2018
10:30

England	6–0	India
Webb 27'; Bray 44', 49', 56'; Unsworth 55'; Danson 57'	Report

Umpires:
Aleisha Neumann (AUS)
Lelia Sacre (CAN)

===== Gold medal match =====
14 April 2018
12:45

New Zealand	4–1	Australia
Gloyn 28'; Keddell 34'; Merry 42'; McLaren 56'	Report	Kenny 50'

Umpires:
Sarah Wilson (SCO)
Ayanna McClean (TTO)

== Statistics ==
=== Final standings ===
As per statistical convention in field hockey, matches decided in extra time are counted as wins and losses, while matches decided by penalty shoot-outs are counted as draws.

Pos	Team	Pld	W	D	L	GF	GA	GD	Pts	Final result
1st place, gold medalist(s)	New Zealand	6	3	3	0	22	2	+20	12	Gold Medal
2nd place, silver medalist(s)	Australia	6	4	1	1	10	4	+6	13	Silver Medal
3rd place, bronze medalist(s)	England	6	4	1	1	17	3	+14	13	Bronze Medal
4	India	6	3	0	3	9	12	−3	9	Fourth place
5	Canada	5	2	2	1	8	3	+5	8	Eliminated in group stage
6	South Africa	5	1	1	3	4	7	−3	4	Eliminated in group stage
7	Scotland	5	2	1	2	10	10	0	7	Eliminated in group stage
8	Malaysia	5	1	1	3	5	12	−7	4	Eliminated in group stage
9	Wales	5	1	1	3	5	11	−6	4	Eliminated in group stage
10	Ghana	5	0	1	4	2	28	−26	1	Eliminated in group stage

Source: FIH

=== Goalscorers ===
There were 92 goals scored in 27 matches, for an average of 3.41 goals per match.

5 goals

- (Australia) Jodie Kenny
- (England) Sophie Bray

4 goals

- (New Zealand) Shiloh Gloyn

3 goals

- (India) Gurjit Kaur
- (India) Rani Rampal
- (New Zealand) Madison Doar
- (New Zealand) Rose Keddell
- (New Zealand) Anita McLaren
- (Scotland) Amy Brodie

2 goals

- (Australia) Grace Stewart
- (Canada) Madeline Secco
- (Canada) Brienne Stairs
- (England) Grace Balsdon
- (England) Alex Danson
- (England) Hannah Martin
- (England) Susannah Townsend
- (Malaysia) Nuraini Rashid
- (New Zealand) Olivia Merry
- (New Zealand) Kelsey Smith
- (Scotland) Millie Brown
- (South Africa) Candice Manuel
- (South Africa) Jade Mayne

1 goal

- (Australia) Edwina Bone
- (Australia) Jane Claxton
- (Australia) Brooke Peris
- (Canada) Danielle Hennig
- (Canada) Shanlee Johnston
- (Canada) Natalie Sourisseau
- (Canada) Kate Wright
- (England) Giselle Ansley
- (England) Laura Unsworth
- (England) Ellie Watton
- (England) Hollie Webb
- (Ghana) Cecilia Amoako
- (Ghana) Serwaa Boakye
- (India) Navneet Kaur
- (India) Lalremsiami
- (India) Nikki Pradhan
- (Malaysia) Hanis Nadiah Onn
- (Malaysia) Nuraslinda Said
- (Malaysia) Fatin Sukri
- (New Zealand) Samantha Charlton
- (New Zealand) Samantha Harrison
- (New Zealand) Stacey Michelsen
- (New Zealand) Brooke Neal
- (New Zealand) Amy Robinson
- (Scotland) Nicola Alexander-Lloyd
- (Scotland) Robyn Collins
- (Scotland) Alison Howie
- (Scotland) Lucy Lanigan
- (Scotland) Katie Robertson
- (Wales) Lisa Daley
- (Wales) Tina Evans
- (Wales) Sian French
- (Wales) Eloise Laity
- (Wales) Natasha Marke-Jones

Source: FIH
