= 2014 Women's Ford National Hockey League =

Tournament details
- Host country: New Zealand
- Dates: 30 August – 14 September
- Teams: 8
- Venue: 9 (in 8 host cities)

Final positions
- Champions: –– Auckland (5th title)
- Runner-up: –– Northland
- Third place: –– Midlands

Tournament statistics
- Matches played: 36
- Goals scored: 133 (3.69 per match)
- Top scorer(s): –– Sian Fremaux –– Michaela Curtis (7 goals)
- Best player: –– Stacey Michelsen

The 2014 Women's Ford National Hockey League was the 16th edition of the women's field hockey tournament. The competition was held in 8 cities across New Zealand, from 30 August to 14 September.

Auckland won the title for the fifth time, defeating Northland 1–0 in the final. Midlands finished in third place after winning the third place match 2–0 over Canterbury.

== Participating teams ==
The following eight teams competed for the title:

- –– Auckland
- –– Canterbury
- –– Capital
- –– Central
- –– Midlands
- –– Northland
- –– North Harbour
- –– Southern

== Results ==
=== Preliminary round ===
Pos	Team	Pld	W	WD	LD	L	GF	GA	GD	Pts	Qualification
1	–– Auckland	7	6	0	0	1	18	9	+9	24	Advanced to Semi-Finals
2	–– Canterbury	7	4	1	1	1	20	9	+11	19	Advanced to Semi-Finals
3	–– Northland	7	4	1	1	1	13	11	+2	19	Advanced to Semi-Finals
4	–– Midlands	7	3	2	0	2	14	10	+4	16	Advanced to Semi-Finals
5	–– Capital	7	2	0	1	4	19	16	+3	9	
6	–– Central	7	2	0	1	4	11	14	−3	9	
7	–– North Harbour	7	1	2	0	4	8	15	−7	8	
8	–– Southern	7	0	0	2	5	6	25	−19	2	

Source: Hockey New Zealand
Rules for classification: 1) points; 2) matches won; 3) goal difference; 4) goals for; 5) head-to-head result; 6) field goals scored.

==== Fixtures ====
30 August 2014
11:30

Southern ––	1–4	–– Auckland
Spratt 41'	Report	C. Harrison 14', 39'; S. Harrison 23'; Jones 35'

Otago Hockey Association, Dunedin
Umpires:
Lucy Townend (NZL)
Karen Bennett (NZL)

30 August 2014
12:00

Northland ––	2–1	–– North Harbour
Douglas 4'; C. Michelsen 32'	Report	Goad 29'

Northland Hockey Association, Whangārei
Umpires:
Melanie Oakden (NZL)
Aleesha Unka (NZL)

30 August 2014
12:30

Canterbury ––	3–1	–– Capital
Fremaux 2', 31', 55'	Report	Reidy 41'

Canterbury Hockey Association, Christchurch
Umpires:
Mark Rippin (NZL)
Katrina Woolf (NZL)

30 August 2014
13:00

Central ––	2–3	–– Midlands
Curtis 18'; Herbert 30'	Report	Jaques 45'; MacDonald 54'; O'Donnell 57'

TET MultiSports Centre, Stratford
Umpires:
Kelly Hudson (NZL)
Julena Phillips (NZL)

31 August 2014
12:00

Auckland ––	1–3	–– Northland
Kwek 59'	Report	S. Michelsen 36', 48'; Hotham 39'

Lloyd Elsmore Hockey Stadium, Auckland
Umpires:
Melanie Oakden (NZL)
Aleesha Unka (NZL)

31 August 2014
12:00

Southern ––	1–9	–– Canterbury
Jopp 22'	Report	McCann 2'; Reid 4', 55'; Merry 5', 49'; Fremaux 10', 48'; Grant 18'; Cocks 34'

Aorangi Park, Timaru
Umpires:
Lucy Townend (NZL)
Karen Bennett (NZL)

31 August 2014
12:00

Midlands ––	1–2	–– North Harbour
Ashton 38'	Report	Judge 35'; Goad 56'

Gallagher Hockey Centre, Hamilton
Umpires:
Julena Phillips (NZL)
Kelly Hudson (NZL)

31 August 2014
12:00

Capital ––	2–3	–– Central
Punt 3'; Roberts 21'	Report	K. Anderson 3'; Curtis 37'; Van Woerkom 51'

Kapiti Sports Turf, Paraparaumu
Umpires:
Joanne Cumming (NZL)
Amber Church (NZL)

6 September 2014
10:30

Auckland ––	2–0	–– Midlands
S. Harrison 47'; Forgesson 60'	Report

North Harbour Hockey Stadium, Auckland
Umpires:
Karen Bennett (NZL)
Melanie Oakden (NZL)

6 September 2014
12:30

North Harbour ––	1–2	–– Canterbury
Henry 31'	Report	Fremaux 27'; Merry 59'

North Harbour Hockey Stadium, Auckland
Umpires:
Kelly Hudson (NZL)
Lucy Townend (NZL)

6 September 2014
14:30

Northland ––	2–1	–– Capital
S. Michelsen 47', 50'	Report	Morgan 44'

North Harbour Hockey Stadium, Auckland
Umpires:
Julena Phillips (NZL)
Amber Church (NZL)

6 September 2014
16:30

Central ––	1–0	–– Southern
Ritchie 14'	Report

North Harbour Hockey Stadium, Auckland
Umpires:
Aleesha Unka (NZL)
Katrina Woolf (NZL)

7 September 2014
11:00

Canterbury ––	2–2	–– Midlands
G. Blackwood 21'; Reid 56'	Report	MacDonald 11'; Gloyn 44'
Penalties
Fremaux (penalty shoot-out scored); Merry (penalty shoot-out missed); Reid (penalty shoot-out missed); Hayward (penalty shoot-out missed); Grant (penalty shoot-out missed)	1–2	(penalty shoot-out missed) O'Donnell; (penalty shoot-out missed) Charlton; (penalty shoot-out scored) MacDonald; (penalty shoot-out missed) Charlton; (penalty shoot-out scored) Gilmore

North Harbour Hockey Stadium, Auckland
Umpires:
Amber Church (NZL)
Melanie Oakden (NZL)

7 September 2014
13:00

North Harbour ––	1–2	–– Auckland
Goad 46'	Report	S. Harrison 33'; Kwek 54'

North Harbour Hockey Stadium, Auckland
Umpires:
Joanne Cumming (NZL)
Lucy Townend (NZL)

7 September 2014
15:00

Capital ––	5–1	–– Southern
O'Callaghan 17'; Smith 32', 56'; Garden-Bachop 52'; Punt 58'	Report	Holland 22'

North Harbour Hockey Stadium, Auckland
Umpires:
Aleesha Unka (NZL)
Julena Phillips (NZL)

7 September 2014
17:00

Central ––	2–3	–– Northland
Ritchie 35'; Curtis 43'	Report	C. Michelsen 1', 49'; Gunson 31'

North Harbour Hockey Stadium, Auckland
Umpires:
Katrina Woolf (NZL)
Karen Bennett (NZL)

8 September 2014
11:30

Auckland ––	2–1	–– Canterbury
Forgesson 29'; Kwek 44'	Report	Hayward 1'

North Harbour Hockey Stadium, Auckland
Umpires:
Joanne Cumming (NZL)
Amber Church (NZL)

8 September 2014
13:30

Midlands ––	2–2	–– Capital
MacDonald 2'; Ashton 50'	Report	De Klijn 4'; Simmonds 12'
Penalties
O'Donnell (penalty shoot-out scored); Charlton (penalty shoot-out scored); MacDonald (penalty shoot-out scored); Hepi (penalty shoot-out scored); Gilmore (penalty shoot-out scored) —— Gilmore (penalty shoot-out scored)	6–5	(penalty shoot-out scored) Reidy; (penalty shoot-out scored) O'Callaghan; (penalty shoot-out scored) Simmonds; (penalty shoot-out scored) Cole; (penalty shoot-out scored) Hadfield —— (penalty shoot-out missed) Reidy

North Harbour Hockey Stadium, Auckland
Umpires:
Kelly Hudson (NZL)
Karen Bennett (NZL)

8 September 2014
15:30

Northland ––	2–2	–– Southern
Nichol 10'; MacAlister 43'	Report	Lane 5'; Miller 22'
Penalties
Gunson (penalty shoot-out scored); C. Michelsen (penalty shoot-out scored); MacAlister (penalty shoot-out missed); S. Michelsen (penalty shoot-out scored)	3–1	(penalty shoot-out missed) McLean; (penalty shoot-out scored) Simpson; (penalty shoot-out missed) Jopp; (penalty shoot-out missed) Wickens

North Harbour Hockey Stadium, Auckland
Umpires:
Lucy Townend (NZL)
Katrina Woolf (NZL)

8 September 2014
17:30

North Harbour ––	1–1	–– Central
Judge 35'	Report	Curtis 17'
Penalties
Hall (penalty shoot-out scored); Nana (penalty shoot-out missed); Henry (penalty shoot-out scored); McCaw (penalty shoot-out missed); Conway (penalty shoot-out scored)	3–2	(penalty shoot-out missed) Curtis; (penalty shoot-out missed) Brady; (penalty shoot-out missed) Herbert; (penalty shoot-out scored) Ritchie; (penalty shoot-out scored) Van Woerkom

North Harbour Hockey Stadium, Auckland
Umpires:
Melanie Oakden (NZL)
Julena Phillips (NZL)

10 September 2014
12:00

Canterbury ––	1–1	–– Northland
Masefield 50'	Report	Rosser 39'
Penalties
Fremaux (penalty shoot-out missed); Reid (penalty shoot-out scored); Hayward (penalty shoot-out scored); McCann (penalty shoot-out scored)	3–1	(penalty shoot-out scored) Gunson; (penalty shoot-out missed) Miller; (penalty shoot-out missed) Jurisisch; (penalty shoot-out missed) MacAlister

North Harbour Hockey Stadium, Auckland
Umpires:
Kelly Hudson (NZL)
Joanne Cumming (NZL)

10 September 2014
14:00

Auckland ––	3–1	–– Central
Forgesson 10'; C. Harrison 17', 36'	Report	Curtis 19'

North Harbour Hockey Stadium, Auckland
Umpires:
Julena Phillips (NZL)
Karen Bennett (NZL)

10 September 2014
16:00

Capital ––	6–1	–– North Harbour
Morgan 3', 29'; Punt 19', 23'; Smith 51'; Reidy 52'	Report	Nana 45'

North Harbour Hockey Stadium, Auckland
Umpires:
Katrina Woolf (NZL)
Lucy Townend (NZL)

10 September 2014
18:00

Midlands ––	3–0	–– Southern
Hepi 41'; Kernaghan 47'; Charlton 55'	Report

North Harbour Hockey Stadium, Auckland
Umpires:
Melanie Oakden (NZL)
Amber Church (NZL)

11 September 2014
11:30

Canterbury ––	2–1	–– Central
McCann 1'; Cocks 23'	Report	Ritchie 36'

North Harbour Hockey Stadium, Auckland
Umpires:
Kelly Hudson (NZL)
Melanie Oakden (NZL)

11 September 2014
13:30

Capital ––	2–4	–– Auckland
Reidy 23'; Simmonds 28'	Report	S. Harrison 4'; Kwek 20'; Forgesson 36', 48'

North Harbour Hockey Stadium, Auckland
Umpires:
Julena Phillips (NZL)
Joanne Cumming (NZL)

11 September 2014
15:30

Midlands ––	3–0	–– Northland
MacDonald 3'; Gloyn 7'; Ashton 11'	Report

North Harbour Hockey Stadium, Auckland
Umpires:
Karen Bennett (NZL)
Lucy Townend (NZL)

11 September 2014
17:30

Southern ––	1–1	–– North Harbour
McLean 14'	Report	Henderson 6'
Penalties
Wickens (penalty shoot-out missed); Simpson (penalty shoot-out missed); McLean (penalty shoot-out scored); Irwin (penalty shoot-out missed); Jopp (penalty shoot-out missed)	1–2	(penalty shoot-out missed) Hall; (penalty shoot-out scored) Nana; (penalty shoot-out missed) Henry; (penalty shoot-out missed) Goad; (penalty shoot-out scored) Thomas

North Harbour Hockey Stadium, Auckland
Umpires:
Amber Church (NZL)
Katrina Woolf (NZL)

=== Classification round ===
==== Fifth to eighth place classification ====
Crossover
13 September 2014
–– Capital	1
–– Southern	2
13 September 2014
–– Central	3
–– North Harbour	0

Fifth Place
14 September 2014
–– Southern	1
–– Central	2
Seventh Place
14 September 2014
–– Capital	1
–– North Harbour	2

===== Crossover =====
13 September 2014
10:30

Central ––	3–0	–– North Harbour
K. Anderson 17'; Norman 30'; Curtis 56'	Report

North Harbour Hockey Stadium, Auckland
Umpires:
Katrina Woolf (NZL)
Julena Phillips (NZL)

13 September 2014
12:30

Capital ––	1–2	–– Southern
O'Callaghan 11'	Report	Irwin 2'; McLean 10'

North Harbour Hockey Stadium, Auckland
Umpires:
Aleesha Unka (NZL)
Lucy Townend (NZL)

===== Seventh and eighth place =====
14 September 2014
08:00

Capital ––	1–2	–– North Harbour
Atcheler 3'	Report	Goad 7'; Green 17'

North Harbour Hockey Stadium, Auckland
Umpires:
Lucy Townend (NZL)
Karen Bennett (NZL)

===== Fifth and sixth place =====
14 September 2014
10:15

Southern ––	1–2	–– Central
Lane 13'	Report	Ritchie 53'; Curtis 59'

North Harbour Hockey Stadium, Auckland
Umpires:
Julena Phillips (NZL)
Aleesha Unka (NZL)

==== First to fourth place classification ====
Semi-finals
13 September 2014
–– Auckland	3
–– Midlands	2
13 September 2014
–– Canterbury	1
–– Northland	3

Final
14 September 2014
–– Auckland	1
–– Northland	0
Third Place
14 September 2014
–– Midlands	2
–– Canterbury	0

===== Semi-finals =====
13 September 2014
10:00

Auckland ––	3–2	–– Midlands
C. Harrison 10', 47'; Kwek 22'	Report	FitzSimons 19'; Kernaghan 35'

North Harbour Hockey Stadium, Auckland
Umpires:
Melanie Oakden (NZL)
Karen Bennett (NZL)

13 September 2014
12:00

Canterbury ––	1–3	–– Northland
Fremaux 38'	Report	S. Michelsen 13', 40'; Gunson 53'

North Harbour Hockey Stadium, Auckland
Umpires:
Joanne Cumming (NZL)
Amber Church (NZL)

===== Third and fourth place =====
14 September 2014
10:00

Midlands ––	2–0	–– Canterbury
Palmer 8'; Ashton 16'	Report

North Harbour Hockey Stadium, Auckland
Umpires:
Joanne Cumming (NZL)
Melanie Oakden (NZL)

===== Final =====
14 September 2014
12:00

Auckland ––	1–0	–– Northland
Forgesson 6'	Report

North Harbour Hockey Stadium, Auckland
Umpires:
Amber Church (NZL)
Kelly Hudson (NZL)

== Awards ==
Player of the Tournament	Top Goalscorers
–– Stacey Michelsen	–– Sian Fremaux –– Michaela Curtis

== Statistics ==
=== Final standings ===
Pos	Team	Pld	W	WD	LD	L	GF	GA	GD	Pts	Qualification
1st place, gold medalist(s)	–– Auckland	9	8	0	0	1	22	11	+11	32	Gold Medal
2nd place, silver medalist(s)	–– Northland	9	5	1	1	2	16	13	+3	23	Silver Medal
3rd place, bronze medalist(s)	–– Midlands	9	4	2	0	3	18	13	+5	20	Bronze Medal
4	–– Canterbury	9	4	1	1	3	21	14	+7	19	
5	–– Central	9	4	0	1	4	16	15	+1	17	
6	–– Southern	9	1	0	2	6	9	28	−19	6	
7	–– North Harbour	9	2	2	0	5	10	19	−9	12	
8	–– Capital	9	2	0	1	6	21	20	+1	9	

Source: Hockey New Zealand

=== Goalscorers ===
There were 133 goals scored in 36 matches, for an average of 3.69 goals per match.

7 goals

- –– Sian Fremaux
- –– Michaela Curtis

6 goals

- –– Krystal Forgesson
- –– Charlotte Harrison
- –– Stacey Michelsen

5 goals

- –– Su Arn Kwek

4 goals

- –– Samantha Harrison
- –– Anita Punt
- –– Deanna Ritchie
- –– Renee Ashton
- –– Stacey MacDonald
- –– Erin Goad

3 goals

- –– Olivia Merry
- –– Cassandra Reid
- –– Georgina Morgan
- –– Felicity Reidy
- –– Kelsey Smith
- –– Carli Michelsen

2 goals

- –– Sophie Cocks
- –– Rachel McCann
- –– Katrina O'Callaghan
- –– Madeleine Simmonds
- –– Kristy Anderson
- –– Shiloh Gloyn
- –– Kate Kernaghan
- –– Elizabeth Gunson
- –– Amie Judge
- –– Paige Lane
- –– Maddison McLean

1 goal

- –– Danielle Jones
- –– Georgina Blackwood
- –– Jordan Grant
- –– Pippa Hayward
- –– Libby Masefield
- –– Niamh Atcheler
- –– Georgia Garden-Bachop
- –– Frederique de Klijn
- –– Aniwaka Roberts
- –– Rebecca Herbert
- –– Pippa Norman
- –– Katherine van Woerkom
- –– Samantha Charlton
- –– Natasha FitzSimons
- –– Oriwa Hepi
- –– Alia Jaques
- –– Nicola O'Donnell
- –– Arnica Palmer
- –– Laura Douglas
- –– Esther Hotham
- –– Jessica MacAlister
- –– Jodie Nichol
- –– Maddison Rosser
- –– Kimberley Green
- –– Courtney Henderson
- –– Kathryn Henry
- –– Shareena Nana
- –– Dayna Holland
- –– Alexandra Irwin
- –– Tessa Jopp
- –– Alana-Rose Miller
- –– Emma Spratt

Source: Hockey New Zealand
