= 2015 Women's Ford National Hockey League =

Tournament details
- Host country: New Zealand
- Dates: 29 August – 20 September
- Teams: 8
- Venue: 9 (in 9 host cities)

Final positions
- Champions: –– Auckland (6th title)
- Runner-up: –– Northland
- Third place: –– Midlands

Tournament statistics
- Matches played: 36
- Goals scored: 170 (4.72 per match)
- Top scorer: –– Gemma McCaw (10 goals)
- Best player: –– Brooke Neal

The 2015 Women's Ford National Hockey League was the 17th edition of the women's field hockey tournament. The competition was held in 9 cities across New Zealand, from 29 August to 20 September.

Auckland won the title for the sixth time, defeating Northland 6–0 in the final. Midlands finished in third place after winning the third place match 7–4 over Canterbury.

== Participating teams ==
The following eight teams competed for the title:

- –– Auckland
- –– Canterbury
- –– Capital
- –– Central
- –– Midlands
- –– Northland
- –– North Harbour
- –– Southern

== Results ==
=== Preliminary round ===
Pos	Team	Pld	W	WD	LD	L	GF	GA	GD	Pts	Qualification
1	–– Canterbury	7	4	1	1	1	18	9	+9	19	Advanced to Semi-Finals
2	–– Midlands	7	4	1	0	2	27	13	+14	18	Advanced to Semi-Finals
3	–– Auckland	7	3	3	0	1	13	9	+4	18	Advanced to Semi-Finals
4	–– Northland	7	4	0	1	2	16	10	+6	17	Advanced to Semi-Finals
5	–– Central	7	3	1	1	2	15	9	+6	15	
6	–– North Harbour	7	3	0	2	2	15	12	+3	14	
7	–– Capital	7	1	0	1	5	13	23	−10	5	
8	–– Southern	7	0	0	0	7	5	37	−32	0	

Source: Hockey New Zealand
Rules for classification: 1) points; 2) matches won; 3) goal difference; 4) goals for; 5) head-to-head result; 6) field goals scored.

==== Fixtures ====
29 August 2015
12:00

North Harbour ––	2–1	–– Northland
Webster 2'; Green 20'	Report	MacAlister 26'

North Harbour Hockey Stadium, Auckland
Umpires:
Melanie Oakden (NZL)
Amber Church (NZL)

29 August 2015
12:00

Midlands ––	2–3	–– Auckland
McCaw 7'; Tanner 18'	Report	King 14'; C. Harrison 20'; Wilson 47'

Rosa Birch Park, Pukekohe
Umpires:
Kelly Hudson (NZL)
Lani Jackman (NZL)

29 August 2015
12:00

Central ––	3–2	–– Capital
Paewai 15', 38'; Waddell 47'	Report	Ashton 28'; O'Callaghan 29'

Hockey Manawatu Inc, Palmerston North
Umpires:
Lucy Townend (NZL)
Joanne Cumming (NZL)

29 August 2015
12:00

Canterbury ––	4–0	–– Southern
Symes 1'; Steele 10'; G. Blackwood 14'; Kiddle 47'	Report

Canterbury Hockey Association, Christchurch
Umpires:
Karen Bennett (NZL)
Katrina Woolf (NZL)

6 September 2015
12:00

Auckland ––	0–3	–– Northland
	Report	C. Michelsen 6'; Thorpe 43', 59'

Lloyd Elsmore Hockey Stadium, Auckland
Umpires:
Melanie Oakden (NZL)
Julena Phillips (NZL)

6 September 2015
12:00

Midlands ––	3–1	–– Central
Tanner 5'; McCaw 12'; Robinson 56'	Report	Whitelock 28'

Taupo Hockey Club, Taupō
Umpires:
Kelly Hudson (NZL)
Amber Church (NZL)

6 September 2015
12:00

Capital ––	0–4	–– Canterbury
	Report	G. Blackwood 11'; Fremaux 48'; Storey 52'; Steele 56'

National Hockey Stadium, Wellington
Umpires:
Karen Bennett (NZL)
Lucy Townend (NZL)

6 September 2015
12:00

Southern ––	1–5	–– North Harbour
Inglis 45'	Report	Pearce 20', 34'; Henry 24'; Goad 33'; Symons 47'

Otago Hockey Association, Dunedin
Umpires:
Joanne Cumming (NZL)
Katrina Woolf (NZL)

12 September 2015
10:30

Canterbury ––	2–1	–– Central
McCann 32'; Cocks 33'	Report	Pollock 57'

Northland Hockey Association, Whangārei
Umpires:
Kelly Hudson (NZL)
Lani Jackman (NZL)

12 September 2015
12:30

Capital ––	5–0	–– Southern
Ashton 8'; Hawes 35'; Eastman 45'; Devine 58'; Smith 59'	Report

Northland Hockey Association, Whangārei
Umpires:
Katrina Woolf (NZL)
Melanie Oakden (NZL)

12 September 2015
14:30

Northland ––	2–1	–– Midlands
S. Michelsen 24'; Thorpe 54'	Report	Kernaghan 41'

Northland Hockey Association, Whangārei
Umpires:
Amber Church (NZL)
Karen Bennett (NZL)

12 September 2015
16:30

North Harbour ––	0–1	–– Auckland
	Report	S. Harrison 25'

Northland Hockey Association, Whangārei
Umpires:
Lucy Townend (NZL)
Joanne Cumming (NZL)

13 September 2015
11:00

Canterbury ––	3–4	–– Midlands
B. Blackwood 18'; Storey 21'; Steele 26'	Report	Kernaghan 19', 35'; McCaw 29'; Charlton 56'

Northland Hockey Association, Whangārei
Umpires:
Melanie Oakden (NZL)
Lucy Townend (NZL)

13 September 2015
13:00

North Harbour ––	3–1	–– Capital
Judge 6'; Henry 12'; Pearce 22'	Report	Punt 48'

Northland Hockey Association, Whangārei
Umpires:
Kelly Hudson (NZL)
Julena Phillips (NZL)

13 September 2015
15:00

Auckland ––	2–2	–– Central
Forgesson 15'; Glynn 46'	Report	Whitelock 49', 50'
Penalties
Sutherland (penalty shoot-out scored); S. Harrison (penalty shoot-out scored); King (penalty shoot-out missed); C. Harrison (penalty shoot-out scored)	3–2	(penalty shoot-out scored) Whitelock; (penalty shoot-out missed) Pollock; (penalty shoot-out missed) Gaddum; (penalty shoot-out scored) Herbert; (penalty shoot-out missed) Norman

Northland Hockey Association, Whangārei
Umpires:
Karen Bennett (NZL)
Joanne Cumming (NZL)

13 September 2015
13:00

Northland ––	5–3	–– Southern
S. Michelsen 9', 27'; Haughn 19', 21'; Polovnikoff 40'	Report	Cowan 5'; Irwin 49'; Wickens 47'

Northland Hockey Association, Whangārei
Umpires:
Amber Church (NZL)
Lani Jackman (NZL)

14 September 2015
12:30

Central ––	3–0	–– North Harbour
Curtis 36'; Herbert 40', 51'	Report

Northland Hockey Association, Whangārei
Umpires:
Kelly Hudson (NZL)
Katrina Woolf (NZL)

14 September 2015
14:30

Southern ––	1–8	–– Midlands
Nicholson 9'	Report	Gloyn 4'; FitzSimons 6'; McCaw 37', 56'; Tanner 53'; Charlton 56'; O'Donnell 57'; Robinson 59'

Northland Hockey Association, Whangārei
Umpires:
Melanie Oakden (NZL)
Joanne Cumming (NZL)

14 September 2015
16:30

Northland ––	4–2	–– Capital
McQuinn 28'; Gunson 33'; Neal 35'; C. Michelsen 44'	Report	Eastman 39'; Smith 54'

Northland Hockey Association, Whangārei
Umpires:
Julena Phillips (NZL)
Karen Bennett (NZL)

14 September 2015
18:30

Auckland ––	0–0	–– Canterbury
	Report
Penalties
Sutherland (penalty shoot-out scored); S. Harrison (penalty shoot-out scored); King (penalty shoot-out scored); C. Harrison (penalty shoot-out scored)	4–2	(penalty shoot-out scored) Fremaux; (penalty shoot-out scored) Merry; (penalty shoot-out missed) McCann; (penalty shoot-out missed) Tinning

Northland Hockey Association, Whangārei
Umpires:
Amber Church (NZL)
Lucy Townend (NZL)

16 September 2015
13:00

Southern ––	0–5	–– Central
	Report	Curtis 6', 51'; Norman 15'; Whitelock 37'; Herbert 59'

Northland Hockey Association, Whangārei
Umpires:
Joanne Cumming (NZL)
Julena Phillips (NZL)

16 September 2015
15:00

Midlands ––	2–2	–– North Harbour
Kernaghan 28'; Jaques 57'	Report	Pearce 40'; Webster 55'
Penalties
Charlton (penalty shoot-out scored); S. O'Donnell (penalty shoot-out scored); McCaw (penalty shoot-out missed); Jaques (penalty shoot-out scored); Hepi (penalty shoot-out scored) —— Charlton (penalty shoot-out scored)	5–4	(penalty shoot-out missed) Hyatt-Brown; (penalty shoot-out scored) Goad; (penalty shoot-out scored) Henry; (penalty shoot-out scored) Dickins; (penalty shoot-out scored) Pearce —— (penalty shoot-out missed) Goad

Northland Hockey Association, Whangārei
Umpires:
Karen Bennett (NZL)
Lucy Townend (NZL)

16 September 2015
17:00

Capital ––	2–2	–– Auckland
Punt 13'; O'Callaghan 16'	Report	McDonnell 11'; C. Harrison 45'
Penalties
Reidy (penalty shoot-out missed); De Klijn (penalty shoot-out missed); Hawes (penalty shoot-out scored); Roberts (penalty shoot-out missed)	1–3	(penalty shoot-out scored) Sutherland; (penalty shoot-out scored) S. Harrison; (penalty shoot-out scored) King

Northland Hockey Association, Whangārei
Umpires:
Melanie Oakden (NZL)
Katrina Woolf (NZL)

16 September 2015
19:00

Northland ––	1–2	–– Canterbury
Haughn 54'	Report	Cocks 42', 49'

Northland Hockey Association, Whangārei
Umpires:
Kelly Hudson (NZL)
Amber Church (NZL)

17 September 2015
12:30

Midlands ––	7–1	–– Capital
McCaw 2', 18', 31'; Gloyn 14', 52'; FitzSimons 25'; O'Donnell 26'	Report	Smith 21'

Northland Hockey Association, Whangārei
Umpires:
Karen Bennett (NZL)
Melanie Oakden (NZL)

17 September 2015
14:30

Auckland ––	5–0	–– Southern
C. Harrison 2'; Glynn 7'; Forgesson 12'; Sutherland 20', 60'	Report

Northland Hockey Association, Whangārei
Umpires:
Julena Phillips (NZL)
Amber Church (NZL)

17 September 2015
16:30

Central ––	0–0	–– Northland
	Report
Penalties
Herbert (penalty shoot-out missed); Pollock (penalty shoot-out missed); Curtis (penalty shoot-out missed); Van Woerkom (penalty shoot-out scored); Ridd (penalty shoot-out missed)	1–0	(penalty shoot-out missed) Gunson; (penalty shoot-out missed) Neal; (penalty shoot-out missed) Jurisich; (penalty shoot-out missed) Hennig; (penalty shoot-out missed) C. Michelsen

Northland Hockey Association, Whangārei
Umpires:
Lucy Townend (NZL)
Kelly Hudson (NZL)

17 September 2015
18:30

Canterbury ––	3–3	–– North Harbour
Fremaux 32', 37'; G. Blackwood 43'	Report	Pearce 17', 25'; Burnside 55'
Penalties
Storey (penalty shoot-out scored); Merry (penalty shoot-out scored); Tinning (penalty shoot-out missed); Hayward (penalty shoot-out missed); Grant (penalty shoot-out scored)	3–2	(penalty shoot-out missed) Green; (penalty shoot-out missed) Pearce; (penalty shoot-out scored) Henry; (penalty shoot-out scored) Symons; (penalty shoot-out missed) Goad

Northland Hockey Association, Whangārei
Umpires:
Lucy Townend (NZL)
Kelly Hudson (NZL)

=== Classification round ===
==== Fifth to eighth place classification ====
Crossover
19 September 2015
–– Central	5
–– Southern	1
19 September 2015
–– North Harbour (pen.)	2 (2)
–– Capital	2 (1)

Fifth Place
20 September 2015
–– Central	0
–– North Harbour	5
Seventh Place
20 September 2015
–– Southern	0
–– Capital	5

===== Crossover =====
19 September 2015
10:00

North Harbour ––	2–2	–– Capital
Dickins 24'; Winterbottom 41'	Report	Reidy 28'; Punt 58'
Penalties
Symons (penalty shoot-out missed); Judge (penalty shoot-out missed); Pearce (penalty shoot-out scored); Hira (penalty shoot-out missed); Henry (penalty shoot-out scored)	2–1	(penalty shoot-out missed) Reidy; (penalty shoot-out missed) Punt; (penalty shoot-out missed) De Klijn; (penalty shoot-out scored) Hawes; (penalty shoot-out missed) O'Callaghan

Northland Hockey Association, Whangārei
Umpires:
Katrina Woolf (NZL)
Julena Phillips (NZL)

19 September 2015
12:00

Central ––	5–1	–– Southern
Norman 7', 54'; Herbert 12'; Paewai 16'; Curtis 52'	Report	Holland 4'

Northland Hockey Association, Whangārei
Umpires:
Karen Bennett (NZL)
Katrina Woolf (NZL)

===== Seventh and eighth place =====
20 September 2015
09:00

Southern ––	0–5	–– Capital
	Report	Devine 19'; Smith 26'; Hawes 27'; Ashton 28', 41'

Northland Hockey Association, Whangārei
Umpires:
Amber Church (NZL)
Julena Phillips (NZL)

===== Fifth and sixth place =====
20 September 2015
09:15

Central ––	0–5	–– North Harbour
	Report	Conway 4'; Pearce 30', 51'; Blake 37'; Goad 40'

Northland Hockey Association, Whangārei
Umpires:
Karen Bennett (NZL)
Katrina Woolf (NZL)

==== First to fourth place classification ====
Semi-finals
19 September 2015
–– Canterbury	2
–– Northland	4
19 September 2015
–– Midlands	2
–– Auckland	3

Final
20 September 2015
–– Northland	0
–– Auckland	6
Third Place
20 September 2015
–– Canterbury	4
–– Midlands	7

===== Semi-finals =====
19 September 2015
10:30

Canterbury ––	2–4	–– Northland
Merry 7'; Denning 31'	Report	Haughn 22'; Polovnikoff 26'; McQuinn 40'; Thorpe 48'

Northland Hockey Association, Whangārei
Umpires:
Amber Church (NZL)
Joanne Cumming (NZL)

19 September 2015
12:30

Midlands ––	2–3	–– Auckland
McCaw 5'; Charlton 53'	Report	Forgesson 24'; King 39'; S. Harrison 52'

Northland Hockey Association, Whangārei
Umpires:
Melanie Oakden (NZL)
Karen Bennett (NZL)

===== Third and fourth place =====
20 September 2015
09:00

Canterbury ––	4–7	–– Midlands
Merry 9', 60+'; Tinning 44'; Storey 50'	Report	Palmer 5'; Charlton 6', 8', 45+'; Gloyn 28'; McCaw 33'; Robinson 51'

Northland Hockey Association, Whangārei
Umpires:
Melanie Oakden (NZL)
Lucy Townend (NZL)

===== Final =====
20 September 2015
13:00

Northland ––	0–6	–– Auckland
	Report	Thompson 4'; Glynn 12'; King 25'; Ritchie 36'; S. Harrison 42'; Wilson 56'

Northland Hockey Association, Whangārei
Umpires:
Joanne Cumming (NZL)
Kelly Hudson (NZL)

== Awards ==
Player of the Tournament	Top Goalscorer
–– Brooke Neal	–– Gemma McCaw

== Statistics ==
=== Final standings ===
Pos	Team	Pld	W	WD	LD	L	GF	GA	GD	Pts	Qualification
1st place, gold medalist(s)	–– Auckland	9	5	3	0	1	22	11	+11	26	Gold Medal
2nd place, silver medalist(s)	–– Northland	9	5	0	1	3	20	18	+2	21	Silver Medal
3rd place, bronze medalist(s)	–– Midlands	9	5	1	0	3	36	20	+16	22	Bronze Medal
4	–– Canterbury	9	4	1	1	3	24	20	+4	19	
5	–– North Harbour	9	4	1	2	2	22	14	+8	20	
6	–– Central	9	4	1	1	3	20	15	+5	19	
7	–– Capital	9	2	0	2	5	20	25	−5	10	
8	–– Southern	9	0	0	0	9	6	47	−41	0	

Source: Hockey New Zealand

=== Goalscorers ===
There were 170 goals scored in 36 matches, for an average of 4.72 goals per match.

10 goals

- –– Gemma McCaw

8 goals

- –– Kirsten Pearce

6 goals

- –– Samantha Charlton

4 goals

- –– Renee Ashton
- –– Kelsey Smith
- –– Michaela Curtis
- –– Rebecca Herbert
- –– Kayla Whitelock
- –– Shiloh Gloyn
- –– Kate Kernaghan
- –– Hannah Haughn
- –– Anna Thorpe

3 goals

- –– Krystal Forgesson
- –– Katie Glynn
- –– Samantha Harrison
- –– Charlotte Harrison
- –– Julia King
- –– Georgina Blackwood
- –– Sophie Cocks
- –– Sian Fremaux
- –– Olivia Merry
- –– Phoebe Steele
- –– Jennifer Storey
- –– Anita Punt
- –– Pippa Norman
- –– Caryn Paewai
- –– Amy Robinson
- –– Kimberley Tanner
- –– Stacey Michelsen

2 goals

- –– Danielle Sutherland
- –– Monique Wilson
- –– Sophie Devine
- –– Charlotte Eastman
- –– Freya Hawes
- –– Katrina O'Callaghan
- –– Natasha FitzSimons
- –– Nicola O'Donnell
- –– Jasmin McQuinn
- –– Carli Michelsen
- –– Samantha Polovnikoff
- –– Erin Goad
- –– Kathryn Henry
- –– Petrea Webster

1 goal

- –– Nicola McDonnell
- –– Deanna Ritchie
- –– Elizabeth Thompson
- –– Bridget Blackwood
- –– Kate Denning
- –– Bridget Kiddle
- –– Rachel McCann
- –– Charlotte Symes
- –– Catherine Tinning
- –– Felicity Reidy
- –– Cathryn Pollock
- –– Casey-Mae Waddell
- –– Alia Jaques
- –– Arnica Palmer
- –– Elizabeth Gunson
- –– Jessica MacAlister
- –– Brooke Neal
- –– Jessica Blake
- –– Tenille Burnside
- –– Alexandra Conway
- –– Stephanie Dickins
- –– Kimberley Green
- –– Amie Judge
- –– Katy Symons
- –– Courtney Winterbottom
- –– Millie Cowan
- –– Dayna Holland
- –– Polly Inglis
- –– Alexandra Irwin
- –– Kelly Nicholson
- –– Sophie Wickens

Source: Hockey New Zealand
