= 2011 Women's Ford National Hockey League =

Tournament details
- Host country: New Zealand
- Dates: 30 July – 14 August
- Teams: 8
- Venue: 9 (in 8 host cities)

Final positions
- Champions: –– Auckland (4th title)
- Runner-up: –– Central
- Third place: –– Midlands

Tournament statistics
- Matches played: 36
- Goals scored: 165 (4.58 per match)
- Top scorer(s): –– Katie Glynn –– Kayla Sharland (13 goals)
- Best player: –– Kayla Sharland

The 2011 Women's Ford National Hockey League was the 13th edition of the women's field hockey tournament. The competition was held in 8 cities across New Zealand, from 30 July to 14 August.

Auckland won the fourth for the first time, defeating Central 5–2 in the final. Midlands finished in third place after winning the bronze medal match 2–1 over Northland.

== Participating teams ==
The following eight teams competed for the title:

- –– Auckland
- –– Canterbury
- –– Capital
- –– Central
- –– Midlands
- –– Northland
- –– North Harbour
- –– Southern

== Results ==
=== Preliminary round ===
Pos	Team	Pld	W	WD	LD	L	GF	GA	GD	Pts	Qualification
1	–– Central	7	5	0	1	1	32	13	+19	21	Advanced to Semi-Finals
2	–– Auckland	7	5	0	0	2	20	13	+7	20	Advanced to Semi-Finals
3	–– Northland	7	5	0	0	2	18	12	+6	20	Advanced to Semi-Finals
4	–– Midlands	7	4	1	0	2	18	13	+5	18	Advanced to Semi-Finals
5	–– North Harbour	7	4	0	0	3	13	9	+4	16	
6	–– Canterbury	7	3	0	0	4	17	19	−2	12	
7	–– Southern	7	1	0	0	6	9	27	−18	4	
8	–– Capital	7	0	0	0	7	4	25	−21	0	

Source: Hockey New Zealand
Rules for classification: 1) points; 2) matches won; 3) goal difference; 4) goals for; 5) head-to-head result; 6) field goals scored.

==== Fixtures ====
30 July 2011
13:00

Auckland ––	3–2	–– Northland
Glynn 47', 56'; Dillon 51'	Report	S. Michelsen 5'; C. Michelsen 7'

Lloyd Elsmore Hockey Stadium, Auckland
Umpires:
Amber Church (NZL)
Helen Travers (NZL)

30 July 2011
13:00

North Harbour ––	3–2	–– Midlands
Dennison 19'; Duley 20'; Webster 58'	Report	Finlayson 22'; Flynn 34'

North Harbour Hockey Stadium, Auckland
Umpires:
Lucy Townend (NZL)
Steven Campbell (NZL)

30 July 2011
13:00

Southern ––	0–5	–– Canterbury
	Report	Heaps 15'; Grant 39'; Fremaux 50', 58'; Bailey-Price 70+'

Otago Hockey Association, Dunedin
Umpires:
Lee Erskine (NZL)
Kimberley Hayter (NZL)

30 July 2011
15:00

Central ––	9–0	–– Capital
K. Sharland 5', 11', 17', 36', 40', 65'; Drysdale 35'; McMahon 49'; V. Sharland 55'	Report

Otago Hockey Association, Dunedin
Umpires:
Toni Maddaford (NZL)
Karen Bennett (NZL)

31 July 2011
12:00

Southern ––	3–7	–– Central
Lee 14'; Symes 50'; O'Connell 70'	Report	K. Sharland 8', 23'; Paewai 9'; McMahon 12', 19'; E. Naylor 35'; A. Naylor 38'

Otago Hockey Association, Dunedin
Umpires:
Kimberley Hayter (NZL)
Karen Bennett (NZL)

31 July 2011
14:30

Northland ––	1–0	–– North Harbour
C. Harrison 37'	Report

Northland Hockey Association, Whangārei
Umpires:
Amber Church (NZL)
Lucy Townend (NZL)

31 July 2011
14:30

Midlands ––	3–2	–– Auckland
Finlayson 26'; Flynn 39', 44'	Report	Glynn 21'; S. Harrison 60'

Tauranga Hockey Association, Tauranga
Umpires:
Carlene Goad (NZL)
Candice Bloom (NZL)

31 July 2011
14:30

Capital ––	1–3	–– Canterbury
Punt 2'	Report	Devine 38', 55'; Fremaux 63'

Otago Hockey Association, Dunedin
Umpires:
Toni Maddaford (NZL)
Lee Eriskine (NZL)

6 August 2011
12:00

Canterbury ––	1–4	–– Auckland
Wetherall 44'	Report	Glynn 9', 32'; Forgesson 19'; S. Harrison 57'

National Hockey Stadium, Wellington
Umpires:
Aleesha Unka (NZL)
Amber Church (NZL)

6 August 2011
14:00

Midlands ––	3–3	–– Central
Gloyn 15', 31', 47'	Report	K. Sharland 54', 70'; Curtis 58'
Penalties
Flynn (penalty shoot-out scored); Finlayson (penalty shoot-out missed); Gloyn (penalty shoot-out scored); Eshuis (penalty shoot-out scored)	3–1	(penalty shoot-out missed) McMahon; (penalty shoot-out missed) K. Sharland; (penalty shoot-out scored) E. Naylor; (penalty shoot-out missed) Hamahona

National Hockey Stadium, Wellington
Umpires:
Kelly Hudson (NZL)
Lucy Townend (NZL)

6 August 2011
16:00

North Harbour ––	2–0	–– Capital
Dunn 41'; Goad 56'	Report

National Hockey Stadium, Wellington
Umpires:
Karen Bennett (NZL)
Helen Travers (NZL)

6 August 2011
18:00

Northland ––	4–1	–– Southern
Esslemont 2'; Thorpe 6'; S. Michelsen 13'; McLeod 28'	Report	Henley 56'

National Hockey Stadium, Wellington
Umpires:
Toni Maddaford (NZL)
Carlene Goad (NZL)

7 August 2011
11:30

Auckland ––	2–1	–– North Harbour
MacDonald 11'; Dillon 13'	Report	Judge 45'

National Hockey Stadium, Wellington
Umpires:
Karen Bennett (NZL)
Lucy Townend (NZL)

7 August 2011
13:30

Canterbury ––	1–2	–– Midlands
B. Blackwood 65'	Report	Eshuis 52'; Charlton 60'

National Hockey Stadium, Wellington
Umpires:
Candice Bloom (NZL)
Aleesha Unka (NZL)

7 August 2011
16:00

Capital ––	2–3	–– Southern
A. Roberts 22'; McFayden 29'	Report	Irwin 43'; Dalziel 45'; Watson 60'

National Hockey Stadium, Wellington
Umpires:
Toni Maddaford (NZL)
Helen Travers (NZL)

7 August 2011
17:30

Central ––	3–1	–– Northland
Nana 23'; Weber 30'; Drysdale 50'	Report	Douglas 67'

National Hockey Stadium, Wellington
Umpires:
Amber Church (NZL)
Kimberley Hayter (NZL)

8 August 2011
12:00

North Harbour ––	3–0	–– Southern
Webster 27'; Savory 32'; Dunn 33'	Report

National Hockey Stadium, Wellington
Umpires:
Kimberley Hayter (NZL)
Carlene Goad (NZL)

8 August 2011
14:00

Northland ––	3–2	–– Midlands
C. Michelsen 29', 33'; Gunson 48'	Report	Cotton 20'; Eshuis 42'

National Hockey Stadium, Wellington
Umpires:
Kelly Hudson (NZL)
Aleesha Unka (NZL)

8 August 2011
17:30

Canterbury ––	1–5	–– Central
Fremaux 57'	Report	Cooper 4', 8'; Hamahona 14'; K. Sharland 49'; Curtis 58'

National Hockey Stadium, Wellington
Umpires:
Amber Church (NZL)
Helen Travers (NZL)

8 August 2011
18:00

Auckland ––	2–1	–– Capital
Forgesson 23'; Rowsell 40'	Report	Cole 14'

National Hockey Stadium, Wellington
Umpires:
Candice Bloom (NZL)
Karen Bennett (NZL)

10 August 2011
11:30

Canterbury ––	3–5	–– Northland
Bailey-Price 7'; Wilson 26'; Fremaux 58'	Report	Douglas 29'; Thorpe 38'; C. Harrison 49'; C. Michelsen 50', 56'

National Hockey Stadium, Wellington
Umpires:
Aleesha Unka (NZL)
Amber Church (NZL)

10 August 2011
13:30

Southern ––	1–4	–– Auckland
Symes 28'	Report	Glynn 14', 62'; Forgesson 18', 35'

National Hockey Stadium, Wellington
Umpires:
Helen Travers (NZL)
Candice Bloom (NZL)

10 August 2011
15:30

Central ––	1–2	–– North Harbour
K. Sharland 12'	Report	Maloney 44'; Webster 59'

National Hockey Stadium, Wellington
Umpires:
Kelly Hudson (NZL)
Kimberley Hayter (NZL)

10 August 2011
16:00

Midlands ––	4–0	–– Capital
Flynn 10'; Charlton 18'; Gloyn 25'; Finlayson 70'	Report

National Hockey Stadium, Wellington
Umpires:
Lucy Townend (NZL)
Karen Bennett (NZL)

11 August 2011
12:00

North Harbour ––	2–3	–– Canterbury
Webster 46', 70'	Report	Rae 45'; Devine 61'; Heaps 64'

National Hockey Stadium, Wellington
Umpires:
Lucy Townend (NZL)
Aleesha Unka (NZL)

11 August 2011
14:00

Auckland ––	3–4	–– Central
Talbot 14'; Dillon 22'; Glynn 54'	Report	Curtis 6'; Hamahona 10'; Paewai 39'; Weber 67'

National Hockey Stadium, Wellington
Umpires:
Kelly Hudson (NZL)
Karen Bennett (NZL)

11 August 2011
16:00

Capital ––	0–2	–– Northland
	Report	Thorpe 23'; C. Michelsen 30'

National Hockey Stadium, Wellington
Umpires:
Helen Travers (NZL)
Kimberley Hayter (NZL)

11 August 2011
17:30

Midlands ––	2–1	–– Southern
Finlayson 1'; Flynn 3'	Report	Irwin 2'

National Hockey Stadium, Wellington
Umpires:
Amber Church (NZL)
Toni Maddaford (NZL)

=== Classification round ===
==== Fifth to eighth place classification ====
Crossover
13 August 2011
–– North Harbour	2
–– Capital	1
13 August 2011
–– Canterbury (a.e.t)	2
–– Southern	1

Fifth Place
14 August 2011
–– North Harbour (a.e.t)	3
–– Canterbury	2
Seventh Place
14 August 2011
–– Capital	5
–– Southern	1

===== Crossover =====
13 August 2011
12:00

Canterbury ––	2–1 (a.e.t.)	–– Southern
Maley 11'; Devine 83'	Report	Dalziel 8'

National Hockey Stadium, Wellington
Umpires:
Lucy Townend (NZL)
Helen Travers (NZL)

13 August 2011
16:00

North Harbour ––	2–1	–– Capital
Maloney 13'; Bone 51'	Report	Punt 29'

National Hockey Stadium, Wellington
Umpires:
Candice Bloom (NZL)
Kimberley Hayter (NZL)

===== Seventh and eighth place =====
14 August 2011
08:00

Capital ––	5–1	–– Southern
McFayden 33', 54', 56'; Muirhead 41', 68'	Report	Chandler 14'

National Hockey Stadium, Wellington
Umpires:
Helen Travers (NZL)
Toni Maddaford (NZL)

===== Fifth and sixth place =====
14 August 2011
12:00

North Harbour ––	3–2 (a.e.t.)	–– Canterbury
Dennison 54'; Dunn 69'; Savory 73'	Report	Wetherall 1'; Fremaux 43'

National Hockey Stadium, Wellington
Umpires:
Candice Bloom (NZL)
Lucy Townend (NZL)

==== First to fourth place classification ====
Semi-finals
13 August 2011
–– Central	3
–– Midlands	0
13 August 2011
–– Auckland	3
–– Northland	1

Final
14 August 2011
–– Central	2
–– Auckland	5
Third Place
14 August 2011
–– Midlands	2
–– Northland	1

===== Semi-finals =====
13 August 2011
11:30

Central ––	3–0	–– Midlands
K. Sharland 7'; Weber 9', 33'	Report

National Hockey Stadium, Wellington
Umpires:
Amber Church (NZL)
Karen Bennett (NZL)

13 August 2011
15:30

Auckland ––	3–1	–– Northland
Glynn 4', 20'; MacDonald 45'	Report	Thorpe 18'

National Hockey Stadium, Wellington
Umpires:
Aleesha Unka (NZL)
Kelly Hudson (NZL)

===== Third and fourth place =====
14 August 2011
09:30

Midlands ––	2–1	–– Northland
Flynn 37'; McGarvey 43'	Report	Thorpe 1'

National Hockey Stadium, Wellington
Umpires:
Kelly Hudson (NZL)
Karen Bennett (NZL)

===== Final =====
14 August 2011
13:30

Central ––	2–5	–– Auckland
Weber 24'; Drysdale 70+'	Report	Glynn 3', 13', 39'; Forgesson 55', 67'

National Hockey Stadium, Wellington
Umpires:
Amber Church (NZL)
Aleesha Unka (NZL)

== Statistics ==
=== Final standings ===
Pos	Team	Pld	W	WD	LD	L	GF	GA	GD	Pts	Qualification
1st place, gold medalist(s)	–– Auckland	9	7	0	0	2	28	16	+12	28	Gold Medal
2nd place, silver medalist(s)	–– Central	9	6	0	1	2	37	18	+19	25	Silver Medal
3rd place, bronze medalist(s)	–– Midlands	9	5	1	0	3	20	17	+3	22	Bronze Medal
4	–– Northland	9	5	0	0	4	20	17	+3	20	
5	–– North Harbour	9	6	0	0	3	18	12	+6	24	
6	–– Canterbury	9	4	0	0	5	21	23	−2	16	
7	–– Capital	9	1	0	0	8	10	28	−18	4	
8	–– Southern	9	1	0	0	8	11	34	−23	4	

Source: Hockey New Zealand

=== Goalscorers ===
There were 165 goals scored in 36 matches, for an average of 4.58 goals per match.

13 goals

- –– Katie Glynn
- –– Kayla Sharland

6 goals

- –– Krystal Forgesson
- –– Sian Fremaux
- –– Gemma Flynn
- –– Carli Michelsen

5 goals

- –– Erin Weber
- –– Anna Thorpe
- –– Petrea Webster

4 goals

- –– Sophie Devine
- –– Jessica McFayden
- –– Cathryn Finlayson
- –– Shiloh Gloyn

3 goals

- –– Honor Dillon
- –– Michaela Curtis
- –– Tara Drysdale
- –– Karri McMahon
- –– Kelsey Dunn

2 goals

- –– Samantha Harrison
- –– Stacey MacDonald
- –– Catriona Bailey-Price
- –– Aimee Heaps
- –– Anna Wetherall
- –– Suzanne Muirhead
- –– Anita Punt
- –– Melody Cooper
- –– Piki Hamahona
- –– Caryn Paewai
- –– Samantha Charlton
- –– Clarissa Eshuis
- –– Laura Douglas
- –– Charlotte Harrison
- –– Stacey Michelsen
- –– Rhiannon Dennison
- –– Karlie Maloney
- –– Kate Savory
- –– Samara Dalziel
- –– Alexandra Irwin
- –– Phillipa Symes

1 goal

- –– Rhonda Rowsell
- –– Lucy Talbot
- –– Bridget Blackwood
- –– Jordan Grant
- –– Jane Maley
- –– Elizabeth Rae
- –– Monique Wilson
- –– Kristy Cole
- –– Aniwaka Roberts
- –– Shareena Nana
- –– Alice Naylor
- –– Emily Naylor
- –– Verity Sharland
- –– Natasha Cotton
- –– Jol McGarvey
- –– Jessica Esslemont
- –– Elizabeth Gunson
- –– Jacinta McLeod
- –– Edwina Bone
- –– Hannah Duley
- –– Erin Goad
- –– Amie Judge
- –– Anita Chandler
- –– Charlotte Henley
- –– Tamsin Lee
- –– Sarah O'Connell
- –– Eloise Watson
