= 2013 Women's Ford National Hockey League =

Tournament details
- Host country: New Zealand
- Dates: 10–25 August
- Teams: 8
- Venue: 8 (in 8 host cities)

Final positions
- Champions: –– Midlands (1st title)
- Runner-up: –– Capital
- Third place: –– Auckland

Tournament statistics
- Matches played: 36
- Goals scored: 142 (3.94 per match)
- Top scorer: –– Renee Ashton (10 goals)
- Best player: –– Samantha Charlton

The 2013 Women's Ford National Hockey League was the 15th edition of the women's field hockey tournament. The competition was held in 8 cities across New Zealand, from 10 to 25 August.

Midlands won the title for the first time, defeating Capital 5–0 in the final. Auckland finished in third place after winning the bronze medal match 4–0 over Canterbury.

== Participating teams ==
The following eight teams competed for the title:

- –– Auckland
- –– Canterbury
- –– Capital
- –– Central
- –– Midlands
- –– Northland
- –– North Harbour
- –– Southern

== Results ==
=== Preliminary round ===
Pos	Team	Pld	W	WD	LD	L	GF	GA	GD	Pts	Qualification
1	–– Auckland	7	6	0	1	0	20	10	+10	25	Advanced to Semi-Finals
2	–– Canterbury	7	5	1	0	1	18	10	+8	22	Advanced to Semi-Finals
3	–– Midlands	7	4	1	0	2	18	10	+8	18	Advanced to Semi-Finals
4	–– Capital	7	4	0	1	2	22	9	+13	17	Advanced to Semi-Finals
5	–– North Harbour	7	3	0	0	4	13	11	+2	12	
6	–– Northland	7	2	0	0	5	12	19	−7	8	
7	–– Central	7	1	1	0	5	7	19	−12	6	
8	–– Southern	7	0	0	1	6	3	25	−22	1	

Source: Hockey New Zealand
Rules for classification: 1) points; 2) matches won; 3) goal difference; 4) goals for; 5) head-to-head result; 6) field goals scored.

==== Fixtures ====
10 August 2013
11:00

Southern ––	0–5	–– Canterbury
	Report	Wetherall 16'; B. Blackwood 19', 45'; G. Blackwood 38'; McCann 50'

Aorangi Park, Timaru

10 August 2013
11:00

Central ––	1–4	–– Capital
Redwood 56'	Report	Roberts 17'; O'Callaghan 28', 48'; Smith 54'

Donnelly Park,
Levin

10 August 2013
12:00

North Harbour ––	1–3	–– Midlands
Webster 24'	Report	Gloyn 27'; Ashton 38'; Kwek 66'

North Harbour Hockey Stadium,
Auckland

10 August 2013
13:00

Auckland ––	4–3	–– Northland
Glynn 12', 64', 65'; Rowsell 19'	Report	N. Evans 2', 5'; Cartwright 62'

Lloyd Elsmore Hockey Stadium,
Auckland

11 August 2013
13:00

Midlands ––	2–2	–– Auckland
Long 18'; Ashton 20'	Report	Glynn 30'; S. Harrison 38'
Penalties
	2–1

Tauranga Hockey Association,
Tauranga

11 August 2013
13:00

Northland ––	2–0	–– North Harbour
N. Evans 12'; C. Harrison 17'	Report

Northland Hockey Association,
Whangārei

11 August 2013
13:00

Canterbury ––	1–0	–– Central
Cocks 18'	Report

Canterbury Hockey Association,
Christchurch

11 August 2013
14:30

Capital ––	6–0	–– Southern
Groen 1'; Welten 23'; Simmonds 25'; O'Callaghan 33'; Hadfield 46'; Roberts 62'	Report

National Hockey Stadium,
Wellington

17 August 2013
10:30

Central ––	2–0	–– Northland
Curtis 17', 24'	Report

North Harbour Hockey Stadium,
Auckland

17 August 2013
12:30

Midlands ––	0–1	–– Capital
	Report	O'Callaghan 37'

North Harbour Hockey Stadium,
Auckland

17 August 2013
14:30

Auckland ––	4–2	–– Canterbury
Forgesson 6', 16'; Simpson 23'; Hunt 60'	Report	Masefield 35'; Wetherall 39'

North Harbour Hockey Stadium,
Auckland

17 August 2013
16:30

Southern ––	0–2	–– North Harbour
	Report	Goad 67'; H. Evans 69'

North Harbour Hockey Stadium,
Auckland

18 August 2013
11:00

Capital ––	2–3	–– Auckland
Welten 11'; O'Callaghan 50'	Report	Thompson 4'; S. Harrison 26'; Forgesson 47'

North Harbour Hockey Stadium,
Auckland

18 August 2013
13:00

Canterbury ––	2–1	–– Northland
McCann 27'; Fremaux 67'	Report	1'

North Harbour Hockey Stadium,
Auckland

18 August 2013
15:00

Southern ––	0–6	–– Midlands
	Report	Neil 8'; 20'; Ashton 31', 58'; Gloyn 36'; Long 56'

North Harbour Hockey Stadium,
Auckland

18 August 2013
17:00

North Harbour ––	6–1	–– Central
Goad 12'; Borren 18'; H. Evans 49'; Taylor 50'; Dennison 52'; Webster 61'	Report	Olivieri 43'

North Harbour Hockey Stadium,
Auckland

19 August 2013
11:30

Canterbury ––	3–1	–– Midlands
G. Blackwood 33'; Merry 40'; Reid 41'	Report	Ashton 9'

North Harbour Hockey Stadium,
Auckland

19 August 2013
13:30

Northland ––	3–2	–– Southern
C. Michelsen 24'; C. Harrison 30'; MacAlister 34'	Report	Spratt 44'; P. Symes 52'

North Harbour Hockey Stadium,
Auckland

19 August 2013
15:30

Auckland ––	4–1	–– Central
Forgesson 3'; Nana 15'; Woolf 62'; Glynn 65'	Report	K. Anderson 16'

North Harbour Hockey Stadium,
Auckland

19 August 2013
17:30

North Harbour ––	2–1	–– Capital
Borren 18'; Webster 29'	Report	J. Anderson 55'

North Harbour Hockey Stadium,
Auckland

21 August 2013
12:00

Midlands ––	3–1	–– Central
Ashton 22', 29'; Charlton 44'	Report	Fey 60'

North Harbour Hockey Stadium,
Auckland

21 August 2013
14:00

Auckland ––	2–0	–– Southern
Hunt 33', 50'	Report

North Harbour Hockey Stadium,
Auckland

21 August 2013
16:00

Canterbury ––	3–2	–– North Harbour
G. Blackwood 10', 68'; 34'	Report	Webster 35+'; 53'

North Harbour Hockey Stadium,
Auckland

21 August 2013
18:00

Northland ––	1–6	–– Capital
C. Michelsen 39'	Report	J. Anderson 5'; O'Callaghan 7', 48'; Smith 40'; Welten 42'; Roberts 70+'

North Harbour Hockey Stadium,
Auckland

22 August 2013
11:30

Central ––	1–1	–– Southern
Fey 32'	Report	Henley 8'
Penalties
	2–1

North Harbour Hockey Stadium,
Auckland

22 August 2013
13:30

Capital ––	1–1	–– Canterbury
Smith 1'	Report	Burnside 54'
Penalties
	2–4

North Harbour Hockey Stadium,
Auckland

22 August 2013
15:30

Midlands ––	3–2	–– Northland
Flynn 43'; Ashton 45'; Kwek 59'	Report	C. Harrison 12'; Nichol 34'

North Harbour Hockey Stadium,
Auckland

22 August 2013
17:30

North Harbour ––	0–1	–– Auckland
	Report	Glynn 51'

North Harbour Hockey Stadium,
Auckland

=== Classification round ===
==== Fifth to eighth place classification ====
Crossover
24 August 2013
–– North Harbour	2
–– Southern	0
24 August 2013
–– Northland	2
–– Central	3

Fifth Place
25 August 2013
–– North Harbour	3
–– Central	0
Seventh Place
25 August 2013
–– Southern	0
–– Northland	4

===== Crossover =====
24 August 2013
11:40

North Harbour ––	2–0	–– Southern
McCaw 51'; Taylor 56'	Report

North Harbour Hockey Stadium,
Auckland

24 August 2013
16:00

Northland ––	2–3	–– Central
C. Michelsen 13', 66'	Report	Sharland 25', 43'; Naylor 38'

North Harbour Hockey Stadium,
Auckland

===== Seventh and eighth place =====
25 August 2013
08:15

Southern ––	0–4	–– Northland
	Report	Morgan 26'; N. Evans 27'; Nichol 33'; MacAlister 41'

North Harbour Hockey Stadium,
Auckland

===== Fifth and sixth place =====
25 August 2013
08:00

North Harbour ––	3–0	–– Central
Goad 2', 14'; Hall 11'	Report

North Harbour Hockey Stadium,
Auckland

==== First to fourth place classification ====
Semi-finals
24 August 2013
–– Auckland	2
–– Capital	3
24 August 2013
–– Canterbury	1
–– Midlands	2

Final
25 August 2013
–– Capital	0
–– Midlands	5
Third Place
25 August 2013
–– Auckland	4
–– Canterbury	0

===== Semi-finals =====
24 August 2013
10:00

Canterbury ––	1–2	–– Midlands
McGregor 17'	Report	Ashton 14'; Long 62'

North Harbour Hockey Stadium,
Auckland

24 August 2013
14:20

Auckland ––	2–3	–– Capital
Wilson 13'; Sutherland 31'	Report	Welten 4'; Simmonds 21'; Punt 53'

North Harbour Hockey Stadium,
Auckland

===== Third and Fourth place =====
25 August 2013
10:00

Auckland ––	4–0	–– Canterbury
S. Harrison 19', 58'; Wilson 38'; Forgesson 63'	Report

North Harbour Hockey Stadium,
Auckland

===== Final =====
25 August 2013
12:30

Capital ––	0–5	–– Midlands
	Report	Ashton 3'; Flynn 10', 48'; Gloyn 23', 34'

North Harbour Hockey Stadium,
Auckland

== Awards ==
Player of the Tournament	Top Goalscorers
–– Samantha Charlton	–– Renee Ashton

== Statistics ==
=== Final standings ===
Pos	Team	Pld	W	WD	LD	L	GF	GA	GD	Pts	Qualification
1st place, gold medalist(s)	–– Midlands	9	6	1	0	2	25	11	+14	26	Gold Medal
2nd place, silver medalist(s)	–– Capital	9	5	0	1	3	25	16	+9	21	Silver Medal
3rd place, bronze medalist(s)	–– Auckland	9	7	0	1	1	26	13	+13	29	Bronze Medal
4	–– Canterbury	9	5	1	0	3	19	16	+3	22	
5	–– North Harbour	9	5	0	0	4	18	11	+7	20	
6	–– Central	9	2	1	0	6	10	24	−14	10	
7	–– Northland	9	3	0	0	6	18	22	−4	12	
8	–– Southern	9	0	0	1	8	3	31	−28	1	

Source: Hockey New Zealand

=== Goalscorers ===
There were 142 goals scored in 36 matches, for an average of 3.94 goals per match.

10 goals

- –– Renee Ashton

7 goals

- –– Katrina O'Callaghan

6 goals

- –– Katie Glynn

5 goals

- –– Krystal Forgesson

4 goals

- –– Samantha Harrison
- –– Georgina Blackwood
- –– Carlijn Welten
- –– Shiloh Gloyn
- –– Naomi Evans
- –– Carli Michelsen
- –– Erin Goad
- –– Petrea Webster

3 goals

- –– Alexandra Hunt
- –– Aniwaka Roberts
- –– Kelsey Smith
- –– Gemma Flynn
- –– Katie Long
- –– Charlotte Harrison

2 goals

- –– Monique Wilson
- –– Bridget Blackwood
- –– Rachel McCann
- –– Anna Wetherall
- –– Jenna Anderson
- –– Madeleine Simmonds
- –– Michaela Curtis
- –– Ashlea Fey
- –– Kayla Sharland
- –– Su Arn Kwek
- –– Jessica MacAlister
- –– Jodie Nichol
- –– Michelle Borren
- –– Holly Evans
- –– Tori Taylor

1 goal

- –– Shareena Nana
- –– Jan Rowsell
- –– Melissa Simpson
- –– Danielle Sutherland
- –– Elizabeth Thompson
- –– Rhianne Woolf
- –– Tenille Burnside
- –– Sophie Cocks
- –– Sian Fremaux
- –– Libby Masefield
- –– Carissa McGregor
- –– Olivia Merry
- –– Cassandra Reid
- –– Elsemiek Groen
- –– Sarah Hadfield
- –– Anita Punt
- –– Kristy Anderson
- –– Emily Naylor
- –– Kandice Olivieri
- –– Elizabeth Redwood
- –– Samantha Charlton
- –– Imogen Neil
- –– Jenna Cartwright
- –– Alyse Morgan
- –– Rhiannon Dennison
- –– Tara Hall
- –– Kate McCaw
- –– Charlotte Henley
- –– Emma Spratt
- –– Philippa Symes

1 own goal

- –– North Harbour (against Canterbury)
- –– Southern (against Midlands)

2 own goals

- –– Canterbury (against Northland and North Harbour)
