= 2016 Women's Ford National Hockey League =

Tournament details
- Host country: New Zealand
- Dates: 27 August – 17 September
- Teams: 7
- Venue: 7 (in 6 host cities)

Final positions
- Champions: –– Canterbury (3rd title)
- Runner-up: –– North Harbour
- Third place: –– Midlands

Tournament statistics
- Matches played: 24
- Goals scored: 91 (3.79 per match)
- Top scorer: –– Amy Robinson (5 goals)

The 2016 Women's Ford National Hockey League was the 18th edition of the women's field hockey tournament. The competition was held in 6 cities across New Zealand, from 17 August to 23 September.

Canterbury won the title for the 3rd time, defeating North Harbour 3–2 in the final. Midlands finished in third place after winning the third place match 2–1 over Auckland.

== Participating teams ==
The following eight teams competed for the title:

- –– Auckland
- –– Canterbury
- –– Capital
- –– Central
- –– Midlands
- –– Northland
- –– North Harbour

== Results ==
=== Preliminary round ===
Pos	Team	Pld	W	WD	LD	L	GF	GA	GD	Pts	Qualification
1	–– Canterbury	6	5	0	1	0	15	6	+9	21	Advanced to Final
2	–– North Harbour	6	4	0	1	1	9	3	+6	17	Advanced to Final
3	–– Auckland	6	3	1	1	1	17	6	+11	15	Advanced to Third Place Match
4	–– Midlands	6	3	1	0	2	20	8	+12	14	Advanced to Third Place Match
5	–– Capital	6	1	1	0	4	9	19	−10	6	
6	–– Northland	6	1	0	0	5	5	22	−17	4	
7	–– Central	6	0	1	1	4	9	20	−11	3	

Source: Hockey New Zealand
Rules for classification: 1) points; 2) matches won; 3) goal difference; 4) goals for; 5) head-to-head result; 6) field goals scored.

==== Fixtures ====
27 August 2016
13:00

Auckland ––	1–1	–– North Harbour
McDonnell 57'	Report	Winterbottom 60'
Penalties
Inglis (penalty shoot-out missed); McDonnell (penalty shoot-out missed); Jones (penalty shoot-out scored); King (penalty shoot-out scored); Harrison (penalty shoot-out scored)	3–2	(penalty shoot-out scored) Hyatt-Brown; (penalty shoot-out scored) Elliot; (penalty shoot-out missed) Dickins; (penalty shoot-out missed) Goad; (penalty shoot-out missed) Ackroyd

Lloyd Elsmore Hockey Stadium, Auckland
Umpires:
Melanie Oakden (NZL)
Julena Phillips (NZL)

3 September 2016
12:00

Canterbury ––	4–2	–– Capital
Leigh 6'; Reid 19', 29'; Eden 21'	Report	Eastman 23'; Van Woerkom 36'

Marist Hockey Club, Christchurch
Umpires:
Karen Bennett (NZL)
Katrina Woolf (NZL)

3 September 2016
13:00

Central ––	1–5	–– Midlands
Curtis 42'	Report	Kernaghan 21'; Tanner 36', 60'; FitzSimons 47'; Hepi 50'

Park Island Hockey Stadium, Napier
Umpires:
Amber Church (NZL)
Joanne Cumming (NZL)

4 September 2016
12:00

North Harbour ––	2–0	–– Northland
Dickins 33'; Hyatt-Brown 34'	Report

North Harbour Hockey Stadium, Auckland
Umpires:
Melanie Oakden (NZL)
Amber Church (NZL)

4 September 2016
12:00

Capital ––	3–3	–– Central
Procter 16'; Van Woerkom 25'; Linton 41'	Report	McNaughtan 11'; Robinson 20', 38'
Penalties
Reidy (penalty shoot-out scored); Mossman (penalty shoot-out scored); Roberts (penalty shoot-out scored)	3–0	(penalty shoot-out missed) Robinson; (penalty shoot-out missed) Waddell; (penalty shoot-out missed) Curtis

National Hockey Stadium, Wellington
Umpires:
Katrina Woolf (NZL)
Melanie Oakden (NZL)

4 September 2016
13:00

Midlands ––	1–1	–– Auckland
Palmer 24'	Report	Wetherall 40'
Penalties
Hepi (penalty shoot-out scored); Gilbert (penalty shoot-out missed); FitzSimons (penalty shoot-out scored); Jaques (penalty shoot-out scored)	3–1	(penalty shoot-out missed) McDonnell; (penalty shoot-out scored) Jones; (penalty shoot-out missed) Inglis; (penalty shoot-out missed) King

Hickling Park, Taupō
Umpires:
Julena Phillips (NZL)
Kelly Hudson (NZL)

10 September 2016
14:00

Northland ––	0–3	–– Auckland
	Report	Wetherall 33'; McDonnell 53'; Simpson 60'

Northland Hockey Association, Whangārei
Umpires:
Joanne Cumming (NZL)
Karen Bennett (NZL)

10 September 2016
16:00

Midlands ––	Forfeit 0–3	–– North Harbour
	Report

Northland Hockey Association, Whangārei
Umpires:
Kelly Hudson (NZL)
Katrina Woolf (NZL)

10 September 2016
18:00

Canterbury ––	1–1	–– Central
Storey 57'	Report	Curtis 55'
Penalties
McCann (penalty shoot-out missed); Reid (penalty shoot-out missed); Storey (penalty shoot-out missed)	0–3	(penalty shoot-out scored) P. Norman; (penalty shoot-out scored) Curtis; (penalty shoot-out scored) Lench

Northland Hockey Association, Whangārei
Umpires:
Melanie Oakden (NZL)
Amber Church (NZL)

11 September 2016
13:30

Auckland ––	5–1	–– Capital
Thompson 6', 26'; Burnett 9', 33'; Jones 10'	Report	Procter 60'

Northland Hockey Association, Whangārei
Umpires:
Joanne Cumming (NZL)
Katrina Woolf (NZL)

11 September 2016
15:30

Northland ––	0–4	–– Canterbury
	Report	Hill 28'; McCann 42'; Kiddle 46'; Bird 60'

Northland Hockey Association, Whangārei
Umpires:
Amber Church (NZL)
Kelly Hudson (NZL)

11 September 2016
17:30

North Harbour ––	2–1	–– Central
Dickins 37'; Judge 40'	Report	Curtis 16'

Northland Hockey Association, Whangārei
Umpires:
Karen Bennett (NZL)
Melanie Oakden (NZL)

13 September 2016
14:00

North Harbour ––	0–1	–– Canterbury
	Report	Hill 14'

Northland Hockey Association, Whangārei
Umpires:
Joanne Cumming (NZL)
Melanie Oakden (NZL)

13 September 2016
16:00

Midlands ––	4–0	–– Capital
Kernaghan 29', 56'; Robinson 42', 57'	Report

Northland Hockey Association, Whangārei
Umpires:
Kelly Hudson (NZL)
Karen Bennett (NZL)

13 September 2016
18:00

Central ––	2–3	–– Northland
Curtis 17'; P. Norman 34'	Report	Polovnikoff 15', 22'; N. McLean 18'

Northland Hockey Association, Whangārei
Umpires:
Katrina Woolf (NZL)
Amber Church (NZL)

14 September 2016
13:30

Auckland ––	1–2	–– Canterbury
Harrison 54'	Report	MacKechnie 25'; Maguire 52'

Northland Hockey Association, Whangārei
Umpires:
Kelly Hudson (NZL)
Joanne Cumming (NZL)

14 September 2016
15:30

Northland ––	0–8	–– Midlands
	Report	Robinson 5', 14', 60'; Jaques 10', 11', 35'; Turner 30'; FitzSimons 49'

Northland Hockey Association, Whangārei
Umpires:
Amber Church (NZL)
Karen Bennett (NZL)

14 September 2016
17:30

Capital ––	0–1	–– North Harbour
	Report	Hyatt-Brown 14'

Northland Hockey Association, Whangārei
Umpires:
Melanie Oakden (NZL)
Katrina Woolf (NZL)

16 September 2016
10:00

Canterbury ––	3–2	–– Midlands
MacKechnie 33'; Hill 51'; Eden 55'	Report	Tanner 2'; Gilbert 29'

Northland Hockey Association, Whangārei
Umpires:
Kelly Hudson (NZL)
Melanie Oakden (NZL)

16 September 2016
10:30

Central ––	1–6	–– Auckland
Lench 17'	Report	Harrison 6', 34'; Doar 8', 53'; King 25'; Simpson 39'

Northland Hockey Association, Whangārei
Umpires:
Amber Church (NZL)
Katrina Woolf (NZL)

14 September 2016
12:00

Capital ––	3–2	–– Northland
Reidy 25'; Roberts 51'; Procter 54'	Report	Eaton 21'; Douglas 43'

Northland Hockey Association, Whangārei
Umpires:
Joanne Cumming (NZL)
Karen Bennett (NZL)

=== Classification round ===
==== Fifth and sixth place ====
17 September 2016
09:15

Capital ––	1–1	–– Northland
Eastman 59'	Report	Polovnikoff 1'
Penalties
Reidy (penalty shoot-out missed); McFetridge (penalty shoot-out scored); Edwards (penalty shoot-out missed); Eastman (penalty shoot-out scored); Van Woerkom (penalty shoot-out scored)	3–2	(penalty shoot-out missed) Pilmer; (penalty shoot-out scored) McLean; (penalty shoot-out missed) Barnes; (penalty shoot-out missed) Eaton; (penalty shoot-out scored) Millington

Northland Hockey Association, Whangārei
Umpires:
Joanne Cumming (NZL)
Melanie Oakden (NZL)

==== Third and fourth place ====
17 September 2016
09:30

Auckland ––	1–2	–– Midlands
Ritchie 9'	Report	Turner 13'; McCleery 55'

Northland Hockey Association, Whangārei
Umpires:
Karen Bennett (NZL)
Katrina Woolf (NZL)

==== Final ====
17 September 2016
17:00

Canterbury ––	3–2	–– North Harbour
Merry 11'; Leigh 21'; Storey 30'	Report	Elliot 27'; Dickins 46'

Northland Hockey Association, Whangārei
Umpires:
Amber Church (NZL)
Kelly Hudson (NZL)

== Statistics ==
=== Final standings ===
Pos	Team	Pld	W	WD	LD	L	GF	GA	GD	Pts	Qualification
1st place, gold medalist(s)	–– Canterbury	7	6	0	1	0	18	8	+10	25	Gold Medal
2nd place, silver medalist(s)	–– North Harbour	7	4	0	1	2	11	6	+5	17	Silver Medal
3rd place, bronze medalist(s)	–– Midlands	7	4	1	0	2	22	9	+13	18	Bronze Medal
4	–– Auckland	7	3	1	1	2	18	8	+10	15	
5	–– Capital	7	1	2	0	4	10	20	−10	8	
6	–– Northland	7	1	0	1	5	6	23	−17	5	
7	–– Central	6	0	1	1	4	9	20	−11	3	

Source: Hockey New Zealand

=== Statistics ===
There were 91 goals scored in 24 matches, for an average of 3.79 goals per match.

5 goals

- –– Amy Robinson

4 goals

- –– Michaela Curtis

3 goals

- –– Samantha Harrison
- –– Hannah Hill
- –– Caitlin Procter
- –– Alia Jaques
- –– Kate Kernaghan
- –– Kimberley Tanner
- –– Samantha Polovnikoff
- –– Stephanie Dickins

2 goals

- –– Fiona Burnett
- –– Madison Doar
- –– Nicola McDonnell
- –– Anna Wetherall
- –– Melissa Simpson
- –– Elizabeth Thompson
- –– Jacqueline Eden
- –– Joie Leigh
- –– Anna MacKechnie
- –– Cassandra Reid
- –– Jennifer Storey
- –– Charlotte Eastman
- –– Katherine van Woerkom
- –– Tori Robinson
- –– Natasha FitzSimons
- –– Lauren Turner
- –– Ella Hyatt-Brown

1 goal

- –– Danielle Jones
- –– Julia King
- –– Deanna Ritchie
- –– Libby Bird
- –– Bridget Kiddle
- –– Emily Maguire
- –– Rachel McCann
- –– Olivia Merry
- –– Kelsey Linton
- –– Felicity Reidy
- –– Aniwaka Roberts
- –– Tyler Lench
- –– Annie McNaughtan
- –– Pippa Norman
- –– Susannah Gilbert
- –– Oriwa Hepi
- –– Ellie McCleery
- –– Arnica Palmer
- –– Laura Douglas
- –– Kelsey Eaton
- –– Neve McLean
- –– Stephanie Elliot
- –– Annie Judge
- –– Courtney Winterbottom

Source: Hockey New Zealand
