= 2015 Men's Ford National Hockey League =

Tournament details
- Host country: New Zealand
- Dates: 29 August – 20 September
- Teams: 8
- Venue(s): 9 (in 8 host cities)

Final positions
- Champions: –– Capital (4th title)
- Runner-up: –– Southern
- Third place: –– Auckland

Tournament statistics
- Matches played: 36
- Goals scored: 180 (5 per match)
- Top scorer(s): –– Nicholas Haig (8 goals)
- Best player: –– Blair Tarrant

The 2015 Men's Ford National Hockey League was the 17th edition of the men's field hockey tournament. The competition was held in various cities across New Zealand, from 29 August to 20 September.

Capital won the title for the fourth time, defeating Southern 4–3 in penalties after the final finished as 0–0 draw. Auckland finished in third place defeating Canterbury 3–2 in the third place match.

== Participating teams ==
The following eight teams competed for the title:

- –– Auckland
- –– Canterbury
- –– Capital
- –– Central
- –– Midlands
- –– Northland
- –– North Harbour
- –– Southern

== Results ==
All times are local (NZST).

=== Preliminary round ===
Pos	Team	Pld	W	WD	LD	L	GF	GA	GD	Pts	Qualification
1	–– Auckland	7	6	0	0	1	20	9	+11	24	Advanced to Semi-Finals
2	–– Southern	7	4	0	2	1	19	10	+9	18	Advanced to Semi-Finals
3	–– Midlands	7	4	1	0	2	19	10	+9	18	Advanced to Semi-Finals
4	–– Capital	7	3	1	0	3	17	12	+5	14	Advanced to Semi-Finals
5	–– North Harbour	7	3	1	0	3	17	20	−3	14	
6	–– Canterbury	7	2	1	3	1	21	16	+5	13	
7	–– Central	7	1	1	0	5	20	29	−9	6	
8	–– Northland	7	0	0	0	7	11	38	−27	0	

Source: Hockey New Zealand
Rules for classification: 1) points; 2) matches won; 3) goal difference; 4) goals for; 5) head-to-head result; 6) field goals scored.

==== Fixtures ====
29 August 2015
14:00

North Harbour ––	6–3	–– Northland
Edwards 5'; Coughlan 19', 51'; Mitani 35', 57'; Capizzi 39'	Report	Staples 34', 43'; Ephraums 52'

North Harbour Hockey Stadium, Auckland
Umpires:
Benjamin Wilson (NZL)
Bevan Nichol (NZL)

29 August 2015
14:00

Midlands ––	0–1	–– Auckland
	Report	M. Child 3'

Rosa Birch Park, Pukekohe
Umpires:
Simon Taylor (NZL)
Benjamin Goodwright (NZL)

29 August 2015
14:00

Central ––	0–5	–– Capital
	Report	Finlayson 6'; Jenness 18', 49'; Van Woerkom 22'; Miskimmin 40'

Hockey Manawatu Inc, Palmerston North

29 August 2015
14:00

Canterbury ––	2–2	–– Southern
Lane 11'; Newman 21'	Report	Morris 34'; Russell 41'
Penalties
Haig (penalty shoot-out scored); Niles (penalty shoot-out missed); C. Hayde (penalty shoot-out missed); Bain (penalty shoot-out scored); Lane (penalty shoot-out scored) —— Haig (penalty shoot-out scored); Lane (penalty shoot-out missed); C. Hayde (penalty shoot-out scored)	5–4	(penalty shoot-out scored) Inglis; (penalty shoot-out scored) Ross; (penalty shoot-out missed) Russell; (penalty shoot-out scored) Davidson; (penalty shoot-out missed) Tarrant —— (penalty shoot-out scored) Inglis; (penalty shoot-out missed) Ross; (penalty shoot-out missed) Davidson

Porritt Park, Christchurch
Umpires:
Gareth Greenfield (NZL)
Benjamin Grant (NZL)

6 September 2015
14:00

Auckland ––	4–1	–– Northland
Rowsell 40'; Keaney 50'; M. Child 55'; Crooks 56'	Report	Hellier 16'

Lloyd Elsmore Hockey Stadium, Auckland
Umpires:
Simon Taylor (NZL)
Benjamin Nichol (NZL)

6 September 2015
14:00

Midlands ––	2–1	–– Central
Rees-Gibbs 22', 46'	Report	Blanks 41'

Taupo Hockey Club, Taupō
Umpires:
Lee Erskine (NZL)
Devendra Patel (NZL)

6 September 2015
14:00

Capital ––	2–3	–– Canterbury
Yeo 2'; Jenness 59'	Report	Bain 20', 57'; Lane 23'

National Hockey Stadium, Wellington
Umpires:
David Tomlinson (NZL)
Andrew Spence (NZL)

6 September 2015
14:00

Southern ––	1–2	–– North Harbour
O'Connor 18'	Report	Elder 11'; Coughlan 52'

Otago Hockey Association, Dunedin
Umpires:
Nicholas Saunders (NZL)
Gareth Greenfield (NZL)

12 September 2015
11:00

Capital ––	1–1	–– Southern
Lett 6'	Report	Inglis 33'
Penalties
Hilton (penalty shoot-out missed); Van Woerkom (penalty shoot-out scored); Read (penalty shoot-out scored); Miskimmin (penalty shoot-out missed); Ebbers (penalty shoot-out scored)	3–2	(penalty shoot-out missed) Tarrant; (penalty shoot-out missed) Shimmins; (penalty shoot-out missed) Ross; (penalty shoot-out scored) Bailey; (penalty shoot-out scored) Inglis

Northland Hockey Association, Whangārei
Umpires:
Benjamin Wilson (NZL)
Simon Taylor (NZL)

12 September 2015
13:00

Canterbury ––	4–4	–– Central
Davidson 13', 42'; C. Hayde 40'; Lane 54'	Report	Jimmieson 1'; Wilson 37', 48'; Atkinson 45'
Penalties
Lane (penalty shoot-out missed); Bain (penalty shoot-out missed); Haig (penalty shoot-out scored); C. Hayde (penalty shoot-out scored); Newman (penalty shoot-out missed) —— Haig (penalty shoot-out scored); C. Hayde (penalty shoot-out missed)	3–4	(penalty shoot-out missed) Alexander-Parker; (penalty shoot-out missed) Hanks; (penalty shoot-out scored) Davison; (penalty shoot-out scored) Wilson; (penalty shoot-out missed) Atkinson —— (penalty shoot-out scored) Wilson; (penalty shoot-out scored) Davison

Northland Hockey Association, Whangārei
Umpires:
Bevan Nichol (NZL)
Devendra Patel (NZL)

12 September 2015
15:00

North Harbour ––	2–7	–– Auckland
Jones 38'; Bennett 39'	Report	Rowsell 2'; M. Child 20'; S. Child 35', 45+'; J. Panchia 39'; Drummond 55'; Ritchie 56'

Northland Hockey Association, Whangārei
Umpires:
Mark Rippin (NZL)
David Tomlinson (NZL)

12 September 2015
17:00

Northland ––	2–6	–– Midlands
Staples 28'; Scanlon 53'	Report	Tanner 13'; Abbott 17'; Hami-Jones 19'; Rees-Gibbs 21'; Z. Woods 45+', 48'

Northland Hockey Association, Whangārei
Umpires:
Lee Erskine (NZL)
Benjamin Grant (NZL)

13 September 2015
10:30

Auckland ––	3–2	–– Central
Archibald 29'; Rowsell 37'; Kingstone 56'	Report	Jimmieson 15+'; Wilson 18'

Northland Hockey Association, Whangārei
Umpires:
Benjamin Wilson (NZL)
Andrew Spence (NZL)

13 September 2015
12:30

Canterbury ––	3–3	–– Midlands
Haig 3', 5', 58'	Report	N. Woods 10'; Linehan 30', 49'
Penalties
Bain (penalty shoot-out missed); Haig (penalty shoot-out scored); C. Hayde (penalty shoot-out scored); Davidson (penalty shoot-out missed)	2–4	(penalty shoot-out scored) Sarikaya; (penalty shoot-out scored) N. Woods; (penalty shoot-out scored) Tanner; (penalty shoot-out missed) Coxhead; (penalty shoot-out scored) Rees-Gibbs

Northland Hockey Association, Whangārei
Umpires:
David Tomlinson (NZL)
Lee Erskine (NZL)

13 September 2015
14:30

Northland ––	0–4	–– Southern
	Report	Morris 11', 47'; Inglis 12', 33'

Northland Hockey Association, Whangārei
Umpires:
Devendra Patel (NZL)
Simon Taylor (NZL)

13 September 2015
16:30

North Harbour ––	1–2	–– Capital
Edwards 24'	Report	Van Woerkom 25'; Jenness 41'

Northland Hockey Association, Whangārei
Umpires:
Benjamin Goodwright (NZL)
Bevan Nichol (NZL)

14 September 2015
13:00

Auckland ––	2–1	–– Canterbury
J. Panchia 34'; Bilkey 51'	Report	Newman 54'

Northland Hockey Association, Whangārei
Umpires:
Simon Taylor (NZL)
Benjamin Wilson (NZL)

14 September 2015
15:00

Central ––	3–4	–– North Harbour
Davison 14', 14', 32'	Report	Mitani 13'; Kosoof 39'; Hanham 45'; Joy 53'

Northland Hockey Association, Whangārei
Umpires:
Bevan Nichol (NZL)
Benjamin Goodwright (NZL)

14 September 2015
17:00

Southern ––	2–1	–– Midlands
O'Connor 16'; Lum 36'	Report	Abbott 54'

Northland Hockey Association, Whangārei
Umpires:
Andrew Spence (NZL)
Benjamin Grant (NZL)

14 September 2015
19:00

Capital ––	5–0	–– Northland
Hilton 20'; Shaw 23'; Logan 29'; Read 37'; Jenness 45+'	Report

Northland Hockey Association, Whangārei
Umpires:
Lee Erskine (NZL)
Mark Rippin (NZL)

16 September 2015
12:30

Auckland ––	2–1	–– Capital
J. Panchia 3'; Kingstone 48'	Report	Smith 59'

Northland Hockey Association, Whangārei
Umpires:
David Tomlinson (NZL)
Andrew Spence (NZL)

16 September 2015
14:30

Southern ––	7–3	–– Central
Shimmins 9'; Inglis 17', 18'; Morris 34'; Lum 39'; Bailey 40'; Russell 48'	Report	Wilson 14'; Ahuja 41'; Davison 52'

Northland Hockey Association, Whangārei
Umpires:
Simon Taylor (NZL)
Mark Rippin (NZL)

16 September 2015
16:30

Northland ––	1–6	–– Canterbury
Scanlon 37'	Report	Haig 19', 26', 28', 34'; Newman 34'; C. Hayde 50'

Northland Hockey Association, Whangārei
Umpires:
Benjamin Wilson (NZL)
Benjamin Goodwright (NZL)

16 September 2015
18:30

Midlands ––	2–0	–– North Harbour
Mitai-Wells 15'; Z. Woods 17'	Report

Northland Hockey Association, Whangārei
Umpires:
Gareth Greenfield (NZL)
Devendra Patel (NZL)

17 September 2015
13:00

Southern ––	2–1	–– Auckland
Russell 6'; Morris 59'	Report	Rowsell 60+'

Northland Hockey Association, Whangārei
Umpires:
Benjamin Goodwright (NZL)
Gareth Greenfield (NZL)

17 September 2015
15:00

Midlands ––	5–1	–– Capital
Linehan 6'; Rees-Gibbs 12'; Z. Woods 36', 57'; Abbott 43'	Report	Logan 36'

Northland Hockey Association, Whangārei

17 September 2015
17:00

Canterbury ––	2–2	–– North Harbour
Newman 14'; Garrett 38'	Report	Bennett 6'; Edwards 45+'
Penalties
Lane (penalty shoot-out missed); Haig (penalty shoot-out scored); C. Hayde (penalty shoot-out missed); Garrett (penalty shoot-out missed)	1–3	(penalty shoot-out scored) Mitani; (penalty shoot-out scored) Edwards; (penalty shoot-out scored) Hanham

Northland Hockey Association, Whangārei
Umpires:
Benjamin Wilson (NZL)
Lee Erskine (NZL)

17 September 2015
19:00

Central ––	7–4	–– Northland
Atkinson 1', 53'; Davison 10', 26'; Jimmieson 15+'; Young 25', 43'	Report	Gurr 2'; Watts 40'; Staples 56', 57'

Northland Hockey Association, Whangārei
Umpires:
Andrew Spence (NZL)
Bevan Nichol (NZL)

=== Classification round ===
==== Fifth to eighth place classification ====
Crossover
19 September 2015
–– North Harbour	6
–– Northland	0
19 September 2015
–– Canterbury	6
–– Central	1

Fifth Place
20 September 2015
–– North Harbour	2
–– Canterbury	3
Seventh Place
20 September 2015
–– Northland	1
–– Central	5

===== Crossover =====
19 September 2015
10:00

Canterbury ––	6–1	–– Central
Connell 4'; Niles 9'; Newman 13'; M. Hayde 20'; Lane 24'; Bain 43'	Report	Wilson 60'

Northland Hockey Association, Whangārei
Umpires:
Devendra Patel (NZL)
Bevan Nichol (NZL)

19 September 2015
14:00

North Harbour ––	6–0	–– Northland
Bennett 3'; Kosoof 14'; Hannon 15+'; Coughlan 23'; Mitani 47'; Humphries 54'	Report

Northland Hockey Association, Whangārei
Umpires:
Benjamin Goodwright (NZL)
Andrew Spence (NZL)

===== Seventh and eighth place =====
20 September 2015
11:00

Northland ––	1–5	–– Central
Staples 54'	Report	Wilson 2', 39'; Atkinson 14'; Ahuja 38'; Davison 51'

Northland Hockey Association, Whangārei
Umpires:
Lee Erskine (NZL)
Benjamin Grant (NZL)

===== Fifth and sixth place =====
20 September 2015
11:15

North Harbour ––	2–3	–– Canterbury
Hazlett 40'; Davidson 43'; Haig 60+'	Report	Capizzi 36'; Bennett 49'

Northland Hockey Association, Whangārei
Umpires:
Bevan Nichol (NZL)
Benjamin Goodwright (NZL)

==== First to fourth place classification ====
Semi-Finals
19 September 2015
–– Auckland	2
–– Capital	3
19 September 2015
–– Southern	2
–– Midlands	0

Final
20 September 2015
–– Capital (pen.)	0 (4)
–– Southern	0 (3)
Third Place
20 September 2015
–– Auckland	3
–– Midlands	2

===== Semi-finals =====
19 September 2015
12:00

Auckland ––	2–3	–– Capital
A. Panchia 8'; Keaney 60'	Report	Symonds 12'; Jenness 37'; Van Woerkom 59'

Northland Hockey Association, Whangārei
Umpires:
Benjamin Wilson (NZL)
Mark Rippin (NZL)

19 September 2015
14:00

Southern ––	2–0	–– Midlands
Inglis 19'; Russell 54'	Report

Northland Hockey Association, Whangārei
Umpires:
Simon Taylor (NZL)
Gareth Greenfield (NZL)

===== Third and fourth place =====
20 September 2015
11:00

Auckland ––	3–2	–– Midlands
Crooks 28'; S. Child 42', 47'	Report	N. Woods 9'; Abbott 30'

Northland Hockey Association, Whangārei
Umpires:
Gareth Greenfield (NZL)
Andrew Spence (NZL)

===== Final =====
20 September 2015
15:00

Capital ––	0–0	–– Southern
	Report
Penalties
Jenness (penalty shoot-out missed); Ebbers (penalty shoot-out scored); Read (penalty shoot-out scored); Van Woerkom (penalty shoot-out scored); Hilton (penalty shoot-out scored)	4–3	(penalty shoot-out scored) Inglis; (penalty shoot-out scored) Ross; (penalty shoot-out scored) Tarrant; (penalty shoot-out missed) Bailey; (penalty shoot-out missed) Shimmins

Northland Hockey Association, Whangārei
Umpires:
David Tomlinson (NZL)
Simon Taylor (NZL)

== Statistics ==
=== Final standings ===
Pos	Team	Pld	W	WD	LD	L	GF	GA	GD	Pts	Qualification
1st place, gold medalist(s)	–– Capital	9	4	2	0	3	20	14	+6	20	Gold Medal
2nd place, silver medalist(s)	–– Southern	9	5	0	3	1	21	10	+11	23	Silver Medal
3rd place, bronze medalist(s)	–– Auckland	9	7	0	0	2	25	14	+11	28	Bronze Medal
4	–– Midlands	9	4	1	0	4	21	15	+6	18	
5	–– Canterbury	9	4	1	3	1	30	19	+11	21	
6	–– North Harbour	9	4	1	0	4	25	23	+2	18	
7	–– Central	9	2	1	0	6	26	36	−10	10	
8	–– Northland	9	0	0	0	9	12	49	−37	0	

Source: Hockey New Zealand

=== Goalscorers ===
There were 180 goals scored in 36 matches, for an average of 5 goals per match.

8 goals

- –– Nicholas Haig

7 goals

- –– Steven Davison
- –– Nicholas Wilson

6 goals

- –– Stephen Jenness
- –– Isaac Staples
- –– Hugo Inglis

5 goals

- –– Dominic Newman
- –– Zachery Woods
- –– Jeremy Morris

4 goals

- –– Simon Child
- –– Dwayne Rowsell
- –– Samuel Lane
- –– Martin Atkinson
- –– Desmond Abbott
- –– Matthew Rees-Gibbs
- –– Cory Bennett
- –– James Coughlan
- –– Genki Mitani
- –– Kane Russell

3 goals

- –– Marcus Child
- –– Jared Panchia
- –– Richard Bain
- –– William Davidson
- –– Benedict van Woerkom
- –– Samuel Jimmieson
- –– James Linehan
- –– Steven Edwards

2 goals

- –– Joseph Crooks
- –– Jonathan Keaney
- –– Kim Kingstone
- –– Cameron Hayde
- –– Oliver Logan
- –– Nitin Ahuja
- –– Matthew Young
- –– Nicholas Woods
- –– Andrew Scanlon
- –– Robert Capizzi
- –– David Kosoof
- –– Richmond Lum
- –– Kieran O'Connor

1 goal

- –– Ryan Archibald
- –– Jonathon Bilkey
- –– Timothy Drummond
- –– Arun Panchia
- –– Michael Ritchie
- –– George Connell
- –– Trevor Garrett
- –– Mitchell Hayde
- –– Angus Hazlett
- –– Jason Niles
- –– Nicholas Finlayson
- –– Blair Hilton
- –– Dane Lett
- –– Harrison Miskimmin
- –– Bradley Read
- –– Alexander Shaw
- –– Jacob Smith
- –– Matthew Symonds
- –– Rowan Yeo
- –– Jake Blanks
- –– Tarrant Hami-Jones
- –– Leo Mitai-Wells
- –– Benjamin Tanner
- –– Joshua Ephraums
- –– Lloyd Gurr
- –– Cameron Hellier
- –– Dion Watts
- –– Nicholas Elder
- –– James Hanham
- –– Alexander Hannon
- –– Jackson Humphries
- –– Craig Jones
- –– Nathaniel Joy
- –– Callum Bailey
- –– Kirk Shimmins

Source: Hockey New Zealand
