= 2013 Men's Ford National Hockey League =

Tournament details
- Host country: New Zealand
- Dates: 10–25 August
- Teams: 8
- Venue(s): 9 (in 8 host cities)

Final positions
- Champions: –– Auckland (3rd title)
- Runner-up: –– Southern
- Third place: –– Canterbury

Tournament statistics
- Matches played: 36
- Top scorer(s): –– Hugo Inglis (14 goals)
- Best player: –– Hugo Inglis

The 2013 Men's Ford National Hockey League was the 15th edition of the men's field hockey tournament. The competition was held in various cities across New Zealand, from 10 to 25 August.

Auckland won the title for the third time, defeating Southern 4–3 in penalties after the final finished as a 2–2 draw. Canterbury finished in third place, defeating Midlands 3–2 in the third place match.

== Participating teams ==
The following eight teams competed for the title:

- –– Auckland
- –– Canterbury
- –– Capital
- –– Central
- –– Midlands
- –– Northland
- –– North Harbour
- –– Southern

== Results ==
All times are local (NZST).

=== Preliminary round ===
Pos	Team	Pld	W	WD	LD	L	GF	GA	GD	Pts	Qualification
1	–– Auckland	7	5	1	0	1	27	13	+14	22	Advanced to Semi-Finals
2	–– Southern	7	4	1	1	1	19	17	+2	19	Advanced to Semi-Finals
3	–– Canterbury	7	4	0	0	3	21	12	+9	16	Advanced to Semi-Finals
4	–– Midlands	7	4	0	0	3	18	13	+5	16	Advanced to Semi-Finals
5	–– North Harbour	7	3	2	0	2	16	15	+1	16	
6	–– Capital	7	3	0	1	3	22	16	+6	13	
7	–– Northland	7	1	0	1	5	10	35	−25	5	
8	–– Central	7	0	0	1	6	12	24	−12	1	

Source: Hockey New Zealand
Rules for classification: 1) points; 2) matches won; 3) goal difference; 4) goals for; 5) head-to-head result; 6) field goals scored.

==== Fixtures ====
10 August 2013
13:00

Southern ––	2–1	–– Canterbury
Morris 57', 67'	Report	Davidson 16'

Aorangi Park, Timaru

10 August 2013
13:00

Central ––	2–5	–– Capital
Hughes 5'; Reardon 19'	Report	Hilton 13'; Van Woerkom 28'; L'Huillier 39'; Jenness 50'; J. Smith 51'

Donnelly Park,
Levin

10 August 2013
14:00

Auckland ––	8–0	–– Northland
Egerton 3', 8', 61'; Keshoor 17'; Crooks 30', 32'; J. Panchia 40'; Ritchie 54'	Report

Lloyd Elsmore Hockey Stadium,
Auckland

10 August 2013
15:00

North Harbour ––	1–3	–– Midlands
Nixon 70+'	Report	Mukherjee 10'; Rees-Gibbs 14'; Brouwer 37'

North Harbour Hockey Stadium,
Auckland

11 August 2013
15:00

Midlands ––	1–4	–– Auckland
A. Hayward 52'	Report	Crooks 21'; Egerton 23'; Ritchie 31'; Bilkey 56'

Blake Park,
Tauranga

11 August 2013
15:00

Canterbury ––	4–2	–– Central
Haig 35+'; Pruijser 40', 68'; Niles 69'	Report	Hanks 12'; Atkinson 14'

Porritt Park,
Christchurch

11 August 2013
15:00

Northland ––	1–4	–– North Harbour
Boccard 43'	Report	Joy 31'; Coughlan 39'; Nixon 48'; Peterson 62'

Kensington Sports Park,
Whangārei

11 August 2013
16:15

Capital ––	3–4	–– Southern
Jenness 9', 49'; Van Woerkom 57'	Report	Inglis 25', 32', 46'; Russell 68'

National Hockey Stadium,
Wellington

17 August 2013
11:00

Capital ––	1–2	–– Midlands
J. Smith 36'	Report	A. Hayward 18', 22'

North Harbour Hockey Stadium,
Auckland

17 August 2013
13:00

Northland ––	0–5	–– Canterbury
	Report	I. Staples 24', 34', 49'; Haig 38', 56'

North Harbour Hockey Stadium,
Auckland

17 August 2013
15:00

Central ––	1–1	–– North Harbour
Reardon 12'	Report	Bennett 65'
Penalties
Atkinson (penalty shoot-out missed); McAleese (penalty shoot-out scored); Reardon (penalty shoot-out missed)	1–4	(penalty shoot-out scored) Kosoof; (penalty shoot-out scored) J. Bartholomew; (penalty shoot-out scored) Coughlan; (penalty shoot-out scored) Muir

North Harbour Hockey Stadium,
Auckland

18 August 2013
10:30

Central ––	4–5	–– Northland
Morar 6'; Beaton 30', 62'; Atkinson 35'	Report	Johnson 20'; Boccard 22', 28'; Laidlaw 45'; 68'

North Harbour Hockey Stadium,
Auckland

18 August 2013
12:30

North Harbour ––	5–3	–– Auckland
J. Bartholomew 5', 15', 50'; Peterson 12', 44'	Report	Rowsell 11'; 34'; S. Miskimmin 64'

North Harbour Hockey Stadium,
Auckland

18 August 2013
14:30

Canterbury ––	5–1	–– Capital
Bain 1'; Niles 14'; Pruijser 29'; B. Shaw 31'; Davidson 47'	Report	Kepes 63'

North Harbour Hockey Stadium,
Auckland

18 August 2013
16:30

Midlands ––	1–2	–– Southern
Brouwer 7'	Report	Bailey 53'; Russell 58'

North Harbour Hockey Stadium,
Auckland

19 August 2013
12:00

Capital ––	7–1	–– Northland
J. Smith 2', 20'; A. Shaw 32'; L'Huillier 33', 51', 54'; 56'	Report	Boccard 8'

North Harbour Hockey Stadium,
Auckland

19 August 2013
14:00

Auckland ––	2–1	–– Central
Ritchie 10'; Egerton 16'	Report	Bhana 12'

North Harbour Hockey Stadium,
Auckland

19 August 2013
16:00

North Harbour ––	3–3	–– Southern
J. Bartholomew 14', 21'; Muir 25'	Report	Ashton 7'; Inglis 38', 40'
Penalties
Kosoof (penalty shoot-out missed); J. Bartholomew (penalty shoot-out scored); Coughlan (penalty shoot-out scored); Bennett (penalty shoot-out missed); Muir (penalty shoot-out scored)	3–1	(penalty shoot-out missed) Inglis; (penalty shoot-out scored) Ockenden; (penalty shoot-out missed) Tarrant; (penalty shoot-out missed) Ross

North Harbour Hockey Stadium,
Auckland

19 August 2013
18:00

Canterbury ––	4–2	–– Midlands
W. Hayde 12'; Davidson 19'; Rohof 47'; C. Hayde 66'	Report	4', 17'

North Harbour Hockey Stadium,
Auckland

20 August 2013
13:00

Southern ––	3–5	–– Auckland
Garske 19', 22'; Inglis 34'	Report	Egerton 6'; S. Miskimmin 10'; Wickham 42'; J. Panchia 57', 60'

North Harbour Hockey Stadium,
Auckland

21 August 2013
11:30

Auckland ––	3–1	–– Canterbury
Rowsell 39'; Egerton 51', 58'	Report	Rohof 55'

North Harbour Hockey Stadium,
Auckland

21 August 2013
13:30

Southern ––	3–2	–– Central
Inglis 13', 59', 65'	Report	McAleese 27'; Hughes 31'

North Harbour Hockey Stadium,
Auckland

21 August 2013
15:30

Northland ––	1–5	–– Midlands
Boccard 48'	Report	Mukherjee 18'; Budgeon 25', 46'; Fowler 27'; Churchill 69'

North Harbour Hockey Stadium,
Auckland

21 August 2013
17:30

Capital ––	3–0	–– North Harbour
Jenness 26', 38'; L'Huillier 59'	Report

North Harbour Hockey Stadium,
Auckland

22 August 2013
12:00

Southern ––	2–2	–– Northland
Ockenden 19'; Inglis 28'	Report	De Paeuw 64'; Langridge 67'
Penalties
Ockenden (penalty shoot-out scored); Russell (penalty shoot-out scored); Tarrant (penalty shoot-out scored); Ross (penalty shoot-out scored); Inglis (penalty shoot-out scored)	5–4	(penalty shoot-out scored) Thorne; (penalty shoot-out scored) Boccard; (penalty shoot-out missed) De Paeuw; (penalty shoot-out scored) Child; (penalty shoot-out scored) Nink

North Harbour Hockey Stadium,
Auckland

22 August 2013
14:00

Auckland ––	2–2	–– Capital
Rowsell 53'; Egerton 54'	Report	L'Huillier 48'; Jenness 57'
Penalties
Wickham (penalty shoot-out scored); M. Child (penalty shoot-out scored); Rowsell (penalty shoot-out scored); J. Panchia (penalty shoot-out scored)	4–2	(penalty shoot-out missed) L'Huillier; (penalty shoot-out scored) J. Smith; (penalty shoot-out scored) Jenness; (penalty shoot-out missed) Burrows

North Harbour Hockey Stadium,
Auckland

22 August 2013
16:00

North Harbour ––	2–1	–– Canterbury
Bennett 4'; Peterson 44'	Report	Bain 41'

North Harbour Hockey Stadium,
Auckland

22 August 2013
18:00

Midlands ––	4–0	–– Central
Budgeon 9'; Linehan 16'; A. Hayward 35+'; Coxhead 59'	Report

North Harbour Hockey Stadium,
Auckland

=== Classification round ===
==== Fifth to eighth place classification ====
Crossover
24 August 2013
–– North Harbour	5
–– Central	1
24 August 2013
–– Capital	5
–– Northland	2

Fifth Place
25 August 2013
–– North Harbour	2
–– Capital	5
Seventh Place
25 August 2013
–– Central (a.e.t)	3
–– Northland	2

===== Crossover =====
24 August 2013
09:30

North Harbour ––	5–1	–– Central
J. Bartholomew 13'; Coughlan 23', 59'; 28'; Alexander-Parker 44'	Report	Reardon 2'

North Harbour Hockey Stadium,
Auckland

24 August 2013
13:50

Capital ––	5–2	–– Northland
J. Smith 18'; L’Huillier 19', 50'; A. Shaw 35+'; Burrows 69'	Report	Boccard 57'; Thorne 63'

North Harbour Hockey Stadium,
Auckland

===== Seventh and eighth place =====
25 August 2013
08:30

Central ––	3–2 (a.e.t.)	–– Northland
Emery 21'; McAleese 61'; Atkinson 76'	Report	Nink 5'; J. Child 9'

North Harbour Hockey Stadium,
Auckland

===== Fifth and sixth place =====
25 August 2013
10:15

North Harbour ––	2–5	–– Capital
Petersen 33'; Kosoof 38'	Report	Kepes 12'; L’Huillier 40', 48'; D. Lett 45'; Gyles 66'

North Harbour Hockey Stadium,
Auckland

==== First to fourth place classification ====
Semi-finals
24 August 2013
–– Auckland	2
–– Midlands	1
24 August 2013
–– Southern	4
–– Canterbury	0

Final
25 August 2013
–– Auckland (pen.)	2 (4)
–– Southern	2 (3)
Third Place
25 August 2013
–– Midlands	2
–– Canterbury	3

===== Semi-finals =====
24 August 2013
12:10

Southern ––	4–0	–– Canterbury
Inglis 8', 15', 34', 55'	Report

North Harbour Hockey Stadium,
Auckland

24 August 2013
16:30

Auckland ––	2–1	–– Midlands
Egerton 3'; Rowsell 41'	Report	Budgeon 62'

North Harbour Hockey Stadium,
Auckland

===== Third and fourth place =====
25 August 2013
10:30

Midlands ––	2–3	–– Canterbury
Z. Woods 49'; A. Hayward 56'	Report	Davidson 11'; Pruijser 14'; C. Hayde 32'

North Harbour Hockey Stadium,
Auckland

===== Final =====
25 August 2013
15:10

Auckland ––	2–2	–– Southern
S. Miskimmin 20'; Rowsell 53'	Report	Morris 42'; Dungey 55'
Penalties
J. Panchia (penalty shoot-out missed); Rowsell (penalty shoot-out scored); M. Child (penalty shoot-out scored); A. Panchia (penalty shoot-out scored); Wickham (penalty shoot-out scored)	4–3	(penalty shoot-out scored) Inglis; (penalty shoot-out scored) Ockenden; (penalty shoot-out missed) Ross; (penalty shoot-out scored) Tarrant; (penalty shoot-out missed) Russell

North Harbour Hockey Stadium,
Auckland

== Statistics ==
=== Final standings ===
Pos	Team	Pld	W	WD	LD	L	GF	GA	GD	Pts	Qualification
1st place, gold medalist(s)	–– Auckland	9	6	2	0	1	31	16	+15	28	Gold Medal
2nd place, silver medalist(s)	–– Southern	9	5	1	2	1	25	19	+6	24	Silver Medal
3rd place, bronze medalist(s)	–– Canterbury	9	5	0	0	4	24	18	+6	20	Bronze Medal
4	–– Midlands	9	4	0	0	5	21	18	+3	16	
5	–– Capital	9	5	0	1	3	32	20	+12	21	
6	–– North Harbour	9	4	2	0	3	23	21	+2	20	
7	–– Central	9	1	0	1	7	16	31	−15	5	
8	–– Northland	9	1	0	1	7	14	43	−29	5	

Source: Hockey New Zealand

=== Goalscorers ===
There were 186 goals scored in 36 matches, for an average of 5.17 goals per match.

14 goals

- –– Hugo Inglis

10 goals

- –– Simon Egerton
- –– Matthew L'Huillier

6 goals

- –– Stephen Jenness
- –– Gauthier Boccard
- –– Joseph Bartholomew

5 goals

- –– Dwayne Rowsell
- –– Jacob Smith
- –– Andrew Hayward
- –– Jan Peterson

4 goals

- –– William Davidson
- –– Mirco Pruijser
- –– Nicholas Budgeon

3 goals

- –– Joseph Crooks
- –– Samuel Miskimmin
- –– Jared Panchia
- –– Michael Ritchie
- –– Nicholas Haig
- –– Isaac Staples
- –– Martin Atkinson
- –– Joseph Reardon
- –– James Coughlan
- –– Jeremy Morris

2 goals

- –– Richard Bain
- –– Cameron Hayde
- –– Jason Niles
- –– Teun Rohof
- –– Gabriel Kepes
- –– Alexander Shaw
- –– Benedict van Woerkom
- –– Simon Beaton
- –– Regan Hughes
- –– Shea McAleese
- –– Ronald Brouwer
- –– Abir Mukherjee
- –– Cory Bennett
- –– Dylan Nixon
- –– Brett Garske
- –– Kane Russell

1 goal

- –– Jonathon Bilkey
- –– Jignesh Keshoor
- –– Thomas Wickham
- –– William Hayde
- –– Bradley Shaw
- –– Phil Burrows
- –– Timothy Gyles
- –– Blair Hilton
- –– Dane Lett
- –– Priyesh Bhana
- –– Marcus Emery
- –– Joseph Hanks
- –– Veeran Morar
- –– Lincoln Churchill
- –– Luke Coxhead
- –– Craig Fowler
- –– James Linehan
- –– Matthew Rees-Gibbs
- –– Zachery Woods
- –– Jeremy Child
- –– Keeley Johnson
- –– Sean Laidlaw
- –– Allister Langridge
- –– Steven Nink
- –– Alexandre de Paeuw
- –– Mark Thorne
- –– Brennan Alexander-Parker
- –– Nathaniel Joy
- –– David Kosoof
- –– George Muir
- –– Christopher Ashton
- –– Callum Bailey
- –– Jason Dungey
- –– Edward Ockenden

1 own goal

- –– Northland (against Capital)
- –– North Harbour (against Auckland)

2 own goals

- –– Canterbury (against Midlands)
- –– Central (against Northland and North Harbour)
