= Simon Egerton =

British field hockey player

Personal information
- Born: 9 January 1985 (age 41) Bury, England

Sport
- Sport: Field hockey
- Position: Midfield/Forward
Senior career
Years	Team	Caps	Goals
1998–2009	Bowdon	-	-
2009–2010	Blau-Weiss Berlin	-	-
2010–2012	Bowdon	-	-
2011	Central	-	-
2012–2013	Beeston	-	-
2013	Auckland	-	-
2013–2014	HGC	-	-
2014–2015	Bowdon	-	-
2015–2019	Rotterdam	-	-
National team
Years	Team	Caps	Goals
2008–2013	England		-

Simon Roger Egerton (born 9 January 1985) is an English former field hockey player.

== Biography ==
Egerton was born in Bury, England. He was a member of the England indoor and outdoor squad from 2008 to 2013. He played as a midfield / forward and scored on both his indoor and outdoor debuts against Scotland (Paisley) and Germany (Nuremberg) respectively. Egerton began his club career with Bowdon Hockey Club, where he spent over a decade with the club.

Egerton later played for Beeston Hockey Club, where he was part of the Beeston team which won the England Premier Division during the 2012–13 England Hockey League season, finishing top goalscorer in the competition. Also while at Beeston, he represented England at the 2012 Men's Hockey Champions Trophy in Melbourne, Australia. In 2013, he was teaching physical education at King's School, Chester.

He also played in the Dutch Hoofdklasse League for HGC and HC Rotterdam. At HGC he finished second top goalscorer with 25 goals.

Egerton had two spells in the New Zealand National Hockey League, winning the competition on both occasions. Central Districts in 2011 and Auckland 2013. Before that Egerton played for Blau Weiss Berlin, he was the top goalscorer in the competition with 28 goals, helping them secure Bundesliga 1. status.
