= Trevor Garrett =

New Zealand cricketer (born 1993)

Personal information
- Born: 31 May 1993 (age 33)
- Source: Cricinfo, 9 March 2018

Trevor Garrett (born 31 May 1993) is a retired New Zealand cricketer. He made his first-class debut for Canterbury in the 2017–18 Plunket Shield season on 9 March 2018. He also represented Canterbury in Field Hockey between 2014 and 2016
