= Tessa Jopp =

New Zealand field hockey player (born 1995)

Personal information
- Born: 18 June 1995 (age 31) Dunedin, New Zealand
- Height: 168 cm (5 ft 6 in)

Sport
- Sport: Field hockey
- Position: Defence
- Club: Southern Alpiners
National team
Years	Team	Caps	Goals
2015–2016	New Zealand U–21	13	(0)
2017–	New Zealand	48	(3)
Medal record
Women's field hockey
Representing New Zealand
Junior Oceania Cup
Silver medal – second place	2016 Gold Coast

Tessa Jopp is a field hockey player from New Zealand.

== Early life ==
Tessa Jopp was born on 18 June 1995, in Dunedin, New Zealand.

== Career ==
=== National league ===
In the Premier Hockey League, Jopp plays for the Southern Alpiners.

=== Under–21 ===
Jopp made her international debut in 2015 at under–21 level. She made her first appearances for the Junior Black Sticks during a Six–Nations Tournament in Breda.

In 2016 she won a silver medal with the national junior squad, taking home silver at the Junior Oceania Cup in the Gold Coast, the Oceania qualifier for the FIH Junior World Cup. She went on later that year to captain the team at the 2016 FIH Junior World Cup in Santiago.

=== Black Sticks ===
Jopp made her senior international debut for the Black Sticks in 2017. She made four appearances in a test series against Argentina in Buenos Aires.

Following her international debut in 2017, Jopp was named in the national squad for 2018 Commonwealth Games in the Gold Coast. Unfortunately, she had to withdraw from the squad nine days prior to the competition due to a heart related health issue.

In 2021, Jopp made her Olympic debut at the XXXII Games in Tokyo.

After missing the 2018 editions of the Commonwealth Games and FIH World Cup, Jopp was named in the squads for both tournaments in 2022.

==== International goals ====
Goal	Date	Location	Opponent	Score	Result	Competition	Ref.
1	19 May 2017	Hawke's Bay Hockey, Hastings, New Zealand	India	2–0	3–0	Test Match	
2	7 July 2022	Wagener Stadium, Amsterdam, Netherlands	India	2–1	4–3	2022 FIH World Cup	
3	4 August 2022	University of Birmingham, Birmingham, England	South Africa	1–0	4–1	2022 Commonwealth Games	
