= Deanna Ritchie =

New Zealand field hockey player (born 1995)

Personal information
- Born: 15 December 1995 (age 30) Pukekohe, New Zealand

Sport
- Sport: Field hockey
- Position: Forward
Senior career
Years	Team	Caps	Goals
2014	Central	9	4
2015–2019	Auckland	37	10
National team
Years	Team	Caps	Goals
2015–2016	New Zealand U–21	14	(5)
2016–	New Zealand	8	(3)
Medal record
Women's field hockey
Representing New Zealand
Junior Oceania Cup
Silver medal – second place	2016 Gold Coast	Team

Deanna Ritchie (born 15 December 1995) is a field hockey player from New Zealand, who plays as a forward.

== Personal life ==
Deanna Ritchie was born and raised in Pukekohe, New Zealand.

== Career ==
=== Domestic league ===
Deanna Ritchie made her National Hockey League (NHL) debut in 2014. She was an import player in the Central team.

From 2015 until 2019, when the NHL was discontinued, Ritchie represented her home side of Auckland. In her first season with the team, she took home the national title.

=== National teams ===
==== Under–21 ====
In 2015, Ritchie made her debut for the New Zealand U–21 team during an invitational tournament in Breda.

She went on to represent the team again the following year. She won a silver medal at the Junior Oceania Cup in the Gold Coast, and was a member of the team at the FIH Junior World Cup in Santiago.

==== Black Sticks ====
Since her debut in 2016, Ritchie has only made occasional appearances in the Black Sticks squad.

Following a number of retirements in the national squad after the 2020 Summer Olympics, Ritchie was officially raised into the squad.
