= Blair Hilton =

New Zealand field hockey player

Medal record

Men's field hockey

Representing New Zealand

Commonwealth Games
Bronze medal – third place	2010 Delhi	Team competition

Blair Hilton (born 28 August 1989 in Wellington) is a New Zealand field hockey player. At the 2012 Summer Olympics and 2016 Summer Olympics, he competed for the national team in the men's tournament. He also competed for New Zealand at the 2010 and 2014 Commonwealth Games.
