= Nick Haig =

New Zealand field hockey player

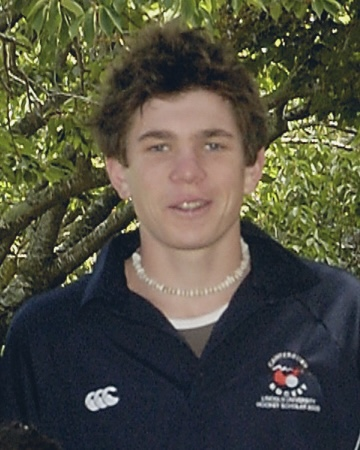
- Haig in 2005

Personal information
- Full name: Nicholas Haig
- Born: 12 March 1987 (age 39) Christchurch, New Zealand
- Height: 180 cm (5 ft 11 in)
- Weight: 82 kg (181 lb)

Sport
- Sport: Field hockey
National team
| Years | Team | Caps | Goals |
| – | New Zealand | | - |
Medal record
Men's field hockey
Representing New Zealand
Commonwealth Games
| Bronze medal – third place | 2010 Delhi | Team competition |

Nicholas Haig (born 12 March 1987, in Christchurch) is a New Zealand field hockey player. At the 2012 Summer Olympics, he competed for the national team in the men's tournament.

Haig comes from a family of hockey players and began playing at the age of five. He was part of the New Zealand team that won the bronze medal at the 2010 Commonwealth Games.
