= Marcus Child (field hockey) =

New Zealand field hockey player

Personal information
- Full name: Marcus Andrew Law Child
- Born: 2 March 1991 (age 35) Auckland, New Zealand
- Height: 182 cm (6 ft 0 in)
- Weight: 80 kg (12 st 8 lb)

Sport
- Sport: Field hockey
- Position: Midfielder / Forward
Youth career
- Team
- –: Auckland
Senior career
Years	Team	Caps	Goals
–2017	Auckland	-	-
2014	Southern Hotshots	-	-
2018–2019	Pinoké	-	-
2019	Auckland	-	-
National team
Years	Team	Caps	Goals
2010–2020	New Zealand	172	-
Medal record
Men's field hockey
Representing New Zealand
Commonwealth Games
Silver medal – second place	2018 Gold Coast	Team
Oceania Cup
Silver medal – second place	2013 Stratford
Silver medal – second place	2017 Sydney
Silver medal – second place	2019 Rockhampton
Hockey World League
Silver medal – second place	2012–13 New Delhi	Team
- Updated on 5 April 2020

Marcus "Marky" Andrew Law Child (born 2 March 1991) is a retired New Zealand field hockey player, who played as a midfielder or forward for the New Zealand national team.

== Personal life ==
Marcus Child was born and raised in Auckland, New Zealand. He has an older brother, Simon, who also plays representative hockey for New Zealand.

== Career ==
Child started playing hockey when he was four years old. He plays for Auckland in the New Zealand Hockey League. In the 2018–19 season he played for Pinoké in the Dutch Hoofdklasse.

Child made his senior international debut for the Black Sticks in 2010. Since his debut, he has been a regular inclusion in the side. In 2018, he was a silver medallist at the Commonwealth Games held in Gold Coast, Australia. In December 2020 he announced his retirement from the national team.
