= Rhiannon Dennison =

New Zealand hockey player

Rhiannon Holdich
Personal information
- Born: Rhiannon Dennison; 14 April 1993 (age 33) North Shore City, New Zealand
- Height: 1.69 m (5 ft 7 in)
- Weight: 64 kg (141 lb)

Sport
- Sport: Field hockey
- Position: Defender
Senior career
Years	Team	Caps	Goals
–	North Harbour	-	-
National team
Years	Team	Caps	Goals
2011 – present	New Zealand	41	-
Medal record
Women's field hockey
Representing New Zealand
Summer Youth Olympics
Bronze medal – third place	2010 Singapore	Team
Commonwealth Games
Bronze medal – third place	2014 Glasgow	Team
- Updated on 12 October 2014

Rhiannon Holdich (née Dennison, born 14 April 1993) is a New Zealand field hockey player who plays for the national team. She competed in the women's hockey tournament at the 2014 Commonwealth Games where she won a bronze medal.
