= Rachel McCann (field hockey) =

New Zealand field hockey player

Personal information
- Born: 29 April 1993 (age 33)

Sport
- Sport: Field hockey
- Position: Midfielder
- Club: Canterbury
Senior career
Years	Team	Caps	Goals
–	Canterbury	-	-
National team
Years	Team	Caps	Goals
–	New Zealand	29	-
Medal record
Oceania Cup
Gold medal – first place	2019 Rockhampton
Silver medal – second place	2017 Sydney
- Updated on 9 June 2016

Rachel McCann (born 29 April 1993) is a New Zealand field hockey midfielder and part of the New Zealand women's national field hockey team.

With the national youth team she won the bronze medal at the 2010 Summer Youth Olympics. On club level she plays for Canterbury in the New Zealand National Hockey League.
