= Jordan Grant (field hockey) =

New Zealand field hockey player

Personal information
- Born: 22 March 1991 (age 35) New Zealand
- Height: 1.69 m (5 ft 7 in)

Sport
- Sport: Field hockey
- Position: Midfield/Striker
Senior career
Years	Team	Caps	Goals
–	Canterbury	-	-
National team
Years	Team	Caps	Goals
2014–present	New Zealand	20	(2)
Medal record
Women's field hockey
Representing New Zealand
Commonwealth Games
Bronze medal – third place	2014 Glasgow	Tournament
- Updated on 20 June 2014 (national)

Jordan Grant (born 22 March 1991) is a New Zealand field hockey player. She has competed for the New Zealand women's national field hockey team (the Black Sticks Women) since 2014, including at the 2014 Commonwealth Games.
