= Charlotte Harrison =

New Zealand field hockey player

Personal information
- Born: 31 July 1989 (age 37) Palmerston North, New Zealand
- Height: 1.67 m (5 ft 6 in)
- Weight: 55 kg (121 lb)

Sport
- Sport: Field hockey
- Position: Forward
- Club: Southern Districts Hockey Club (Papatoetoe, Auckland)
Senior career
Years	Team	Caps	Goals
–	Northland	-	-
National team
Years	Team	Caps	Goals
2005–	New Zealand	177	(46)
Medal record
Commonwealth Games
Silver medal – second place	2010 Delhi	Team
Champions Trophy
Bronze medal – third place	2011 Amstelveen
Champions Challenge
Gold medal – first place	2009 Cape Town
- Updated on 26 April 2013 (national)

Charlotte Harrison (born 31 July 1989) is a New Zealand field hockey player. She has competed for the New Zealand women's national field hockey team (the Black Sticks Women), including for the team at the 2012 and 2016 Summer Olympics and at the 2006 and 2010 Commonwealth Games, and as a reserve for the team at the 2008 Summer Olympics.

Harrison was first selected for the Black Sticks Women in October 2005 on the back of her performance for Northland in the National Hockey League that year. At the time, she was 16 years old, making her the youngest ever player selected for the Black Sticks Women. She played her first match for the Black Sticks on 31 October 2005, against Australia in Pakuranga, Auckland, as part of the 2005 Oceania Cup and World Cup qualifier.

Born in Palmerston North to Steve and Zanna Harrison, Charlotte spent most of her early life living in Whangārei. She is of Māori descent, and affiliates to the Ngāpuhi iwi. She has two younger sisters: Samantha, who joined Charlotte playing for the Black Sticks Women in 2009, and Anita. Despite Charlotte being two years older and three centimetres (1 in) shorter than her sister Samantha, once the two competed together for the Black Sticks, their similarities in appearance became apparent and were often mistaken for each other by commentators and match officials. This was partially alleviated by Samantha dyeing her hair brown in mid-2010, but within a year reverted to her natural blonde colour.

Harrison attended Whangarei Girls' High School, before later studying beauty therapy at the Auckland University of Technology. As of August 2012, she resides on Auckland's North Shore where she is employed as a beautician.

At club level, Harrison is a member of the Southern Districts Hockey Club, based in Papatoetoe, Auckland. In the National Hockey League, she is a member of the Northland women's team.
