= Samantha Harrison =

New Zealand field hockey player (born 1991)

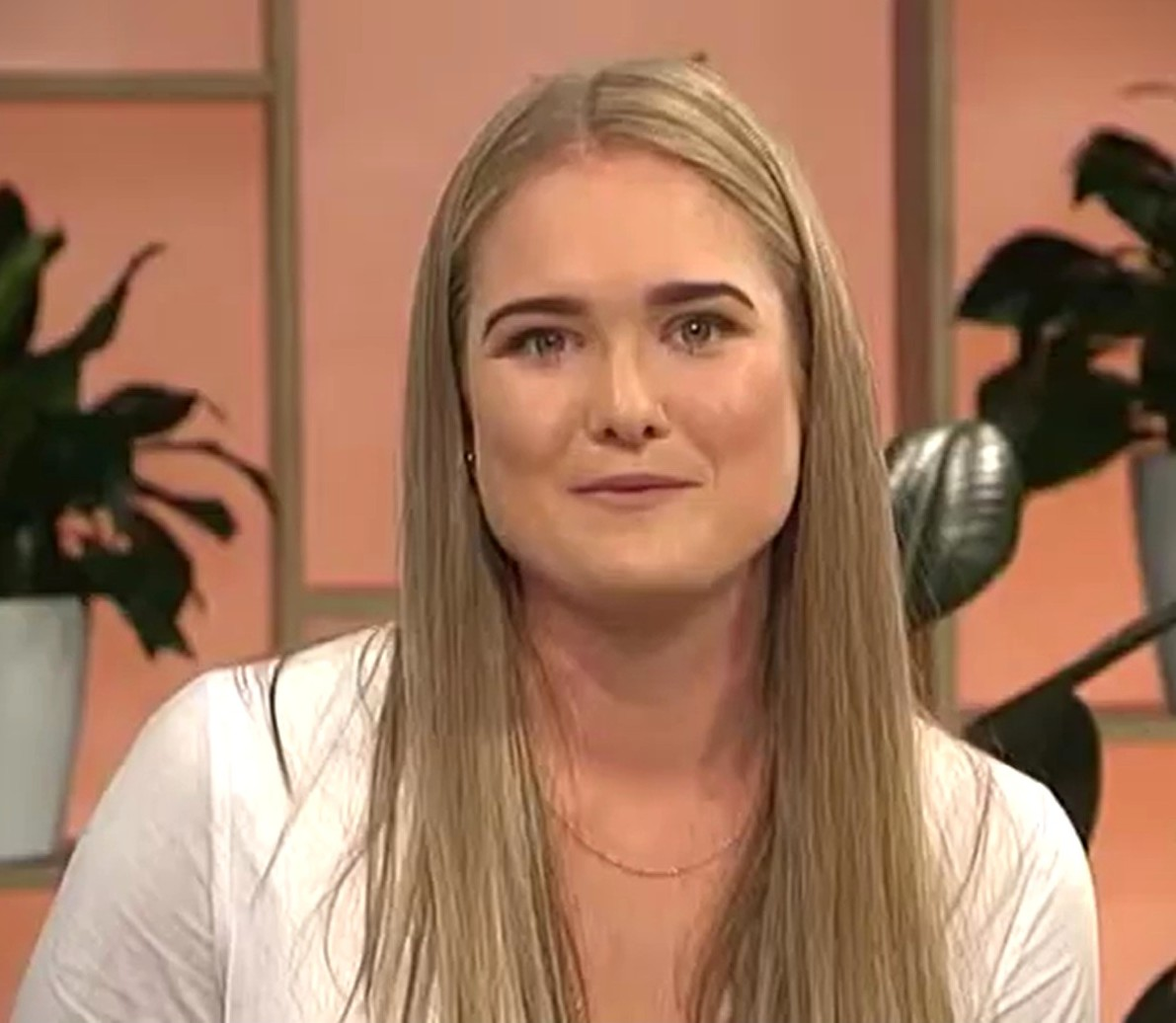
- Harrison in 2017

Personal information
- Born: 29 August 1991 (age 35) Whangārei, New Zealand
- Height: 1.7 m (5 ft 7 in)
- Weight: 60 kg (132 lb)

Sport
- Sport: Field hockey
- Position: Forward / Midfield
- Club: Southern Districts Hockey Club
Senior career
Years	Team	Caps	Goals
–	Auckland Fury	-	-
National team
Years	Team	Caps	Goals
2009–	New Zealand	149	(17)
Medal record
Representing New Zealand
Women's field hockey
Commonwealth Games
Gold medal – first place	2018 Gold Coast	Team
Silver medal – second place	2010 Delhi	Team
Champions Trophy
Bronze medal – third place	2011 Amstelveen
Champions Challenge
Gold medal – first place	2009 Cape Town
Oceania Cup
Silver medal – second place	2017 Sydney

Samantha "Sam" Harrison (born 29 August 1991) is a New Zealand field hockey player. She has competed for the New Zealand women's national field hockey team (the Black Sticks Women), including for the team at the 2010 Commonwealth Games and the 2012 Summer Olympics.

== Education ==
Born in Whangārei to Steve and Zanna Harrison, Samantha is the second of three sisters, between Charlotte and younger sister Anita. Samantha attended Whangarei Girls' High School before moving to Diocesan School for Girls in Auckland in Year 11 (Form 5).

In the early 2010s, Harrison studied psychology at the Auckland University of Technology on Auckland's North Shore.

== Career ==
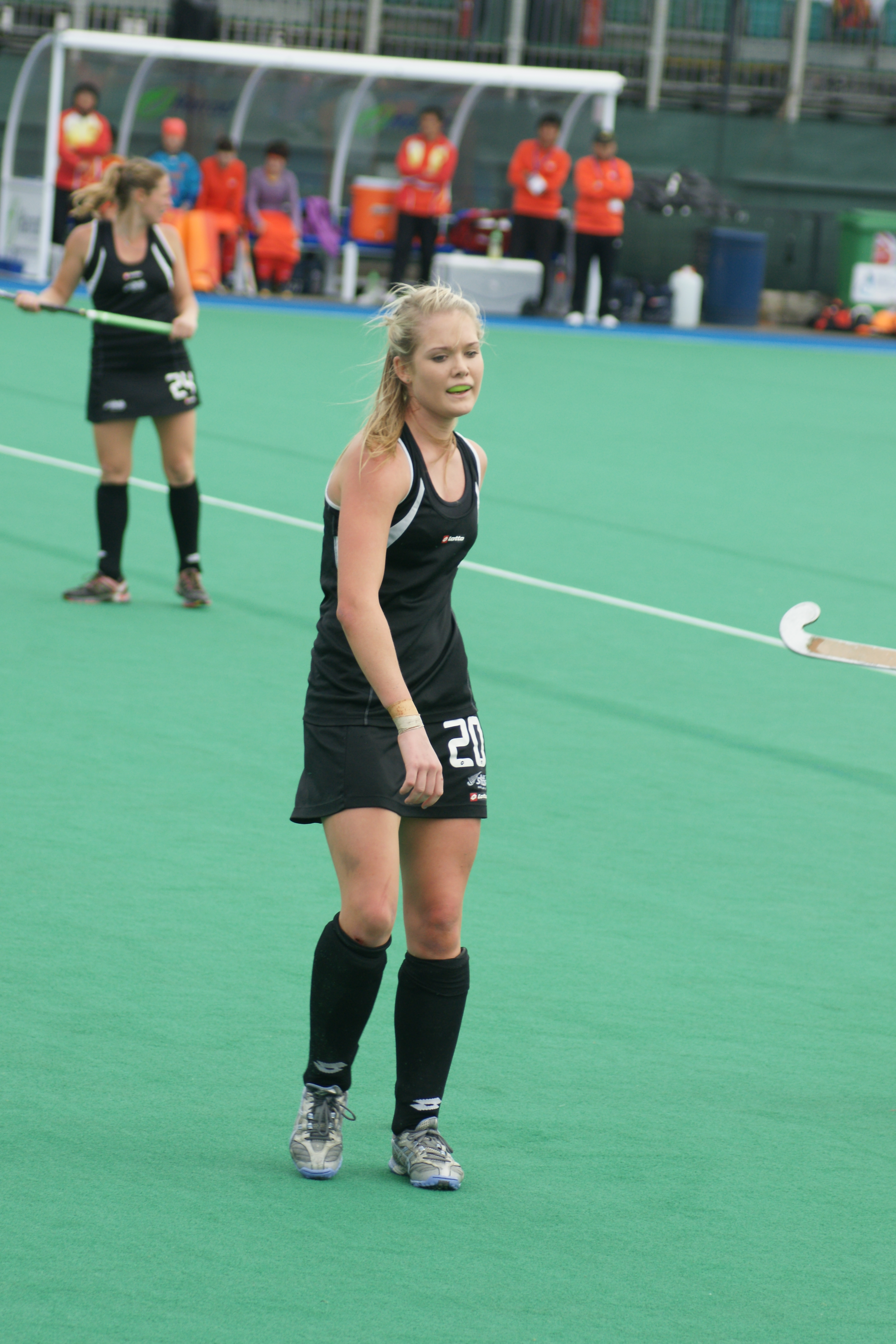
Harrison, July 2009

Harrison was first selected for the Black Sticks Women in June 2009, along with ten other players as the Black Sticks squad was overhauled following its last-place finish at the 2008 Beijing Olympics, joining her older sister Charlotte, who had been in the team since October 2005. She played her first official match for the Black Sticks on 3 July 2009, against Argentina in her hometown of Whangārei, as part of a series of games against Argentina and China.

Harrison was part of the New Zealand team that played at the 2010 Commonwealth Games, winning a silver medal. She then participated at the 2012 Summer Olympics, where New Zealand finished fourth.

In November 2012, Harrison was demoted from the Black Sticks national squad to the development squad for the 2013 year, after national coach Mark Hager felt she was suffering from burnout. At the time, Harrison spent three months in Cambridge, England, coaching hockey at The Leys School.

At the 2018 Commonwealth Games, Harrison was part of the New Zealand team that won the women's competition.

Despite Samantha being two years younger and three centimetres (1 in) taller than her sister Charlotte, once the two competed together for the Black Sticks, their similarities in appearance became apparent and they were often mistaken for each other by commentators and match officials.

At club level, Harrison is a member of the Southern Districts Hockey Club, based in Papatoetoe, Auckland. In the National Hockey League, she is a member of the Auckland Fury women's team.
