= Aniwaka Roberts =

New Zealand field hockey player

Aniwaka Haumaha
Personal information
- Born: Aniwaka Roberts; 22 April 1989 (age 37) Wellington, New Zealand

Sport
- Sport: Field hockey
- Position: Midfield
Senior career
Years	Team	Caps	Goals
2008–2018	Capital	101	16
2020	Central Falcons	7	0
National team
Years	Team	Caps	Goals
2012–	New Zealand	67	(0)

Aniwaka Haumaha (née Roberts, born 22 April 1989) is a field hockey player from New Zealand, who plays as a midfielder.

== Personal life ==
Aniwaka Roberts was born and raised in Wellington, New Zealand.

Roberts is the younger sister of Niniwa Roberts. Her sister was also a representative for New Zealand in field hockey.

== Career ==
=== Domestic competitions ===
==== Ford NHL ====
In the Ford National Hockey League (NHL), Roberts represented her home region of Wellington as a member of the Capital hockey team. In her ten-year career for the team, Roberts amassed a record 101 appearances.

==== Premier Hockey League ====
Following the overhaul of the Ford NHL, Roberts became a member of the Central Falcons in the Premier Hockey League.

=== National team ===
Aniwaka Roberts made her debut for the Black Sticks in 2012, during a test series against India in Wellington.

Following her debut, she made a string of appearances in the national team before officially being named in the squad. In 2013 however, Roberts suffered a mystery medical condition which impaired her ability to represent the national team. Following a diagnosis of an allergy to shellfish, Roberts returned to her top form and back to the national squad.

2014 and 2015 proved to be Roberts' biggest years in the national team, representing the side at many major tournaments. Her last appearance for the Black Sticks was at the 2014–15 FIH World League Semi-Finals in Antwerp.
