= Erin Goad =

New Zealand field hockey player

Personal information
- Born: 25 May 1993 (age 33) Henderson, New Zealand
- Height: 161 cm (5 ft 3 in)

Sport
- Sport: Field hockey
- Position: Forward
Senior career
Years	Team	Caps	Goals
2011–2019	North Harbour	59	13
2020–	Northern Tridents	7	0
National team
Years	Team	Caps	Goals
2013	New Zealand U–21	6	(2)
2014–	New Zealand	45	(1)
Medal record
Women's field hockey
Representing New Zealand
FIH World League
Silver medal – second place	2016–17 Auckland	Team

Erin Goad (born 25 May 1993) is a field hockey player from New Zealand, who plays as a defender.

== Personal life ==
Goad was born and raised in Henderson, New Zealand.

== Career ==
=== National teams ===
==== Under–21 ====
Goad debuted for the New Zealand U–21 team in 2013 at the FIH Junior World Cup in Mönchengladbach.

==== Black Sticks ====
In 2014, Goad made her debut for the Black Sticks during a test series against the United States in New Zealand.

Following a two-year hiatus from the national team, Goad returned to the squad in 2016 on a more permanent basis. Her most prominent year with the team was 2017, where she appeared in the Hawke's Bay Cup and the FIH World League Final, where she won a silver medal.

=== International goals ===
Goal	Date	Location	Opponent	Score	Result	Competition	Ref.
1	28 February 2020	North Harbour Hockey Stadium, Auckland, New Zealand	South Korea	1–0	1–2	2016–17 FIH World League Final	
