= Michaela Curtis =

New Zealand field hockey player

Personal information
- Born: 21 October 1993 (age 32) Palmerston North, New Zealand

Sport
- Sport: Field hockey
- Position: Forward
- Club: Surbiton
National team
Years	Team	Caps	Goals
2013–	New Zealand	57	(0)
2010	New Zealand U18	6	(4)
2013	New Zealand U21	6	(2)
Medal record
Women's field hockey
Representing New Zealand
Youth Olympic Games
Bronze medal – third place	2010 Singapore	Team

Michaela Curtis (born 21 October 1993) is a field hockey player from New Zealand.

== Career ==
=== Junior National Teams ===
In 2010, Curtis was a member of the New Zealand Under 18 team at the 2010 Summer Youth Olympics in Singapore. This was the first edition of field hockey at the Summer Youth Olympics, where the New Zealand team won bronze. Curtis scored the winning goal, in golden goal extra time, to defeat South Korea 5–4.

Curtis once again represented New Zealand at a junior level in 2013, at the Junior World Cup in Mönchengladbach. The New Zealand Under 21 team finished in 9th place, defeating hosts Germany 2–1 in the ninth place playoff, with Curtis scoring a field goal in the 6th minute.

=== Senior National Team ===
Curtis was born in Palmerston North, New Zealand, and made her senior international debut in a four nations tournament in 2013.
