= New Zealand National Hockey League =

- Sport: Field Hockey
- Founded: 2000
- Folded: 2019
- Replaced by: National Hockey Championship / Premier Hockey League
- No. of teams: 8
- Country: New Zealand
- Last champions: M: North Harbour; W: North Harbour
- Most titles: M: Wellington/Capital (7 titles); W: Auckland (5 titles)
- Website: Official website

The New Zealand National Hockey League, known also by the sponsored name Ford National Hockey League, was the New Zealand's national field hockey championship.

The competition features players from New Zealand's national hockey teams, the Black Sticks Men and Women.

The most recent champions are North Harbour in the men's tournament, and North Harbour in the women's.

== History ==
The first season of both the men's and women's Ford National Hockey League took place in 2000, and has been held annually since. The most successful team in both the men's and women's competition is Auckland, with both teams having won 5 titles apiece.

2019 will mark the end of the Ford NHL, with Hockey New Zealand restructuring the tournament into the Premier Hockey League in 2020.

== Men's tournament ==
=== Men's Teams ===
The following are the men's teams at the 2019 National Hockey League:

- –– Auckland
- –– Canterbury
- –– Capital
- –– Central
- –– Midlands
- –– Northland
- –– North Harbour
- –– Southern
- (Australia) Tasmania

=== Men's Results Summaries ===
- Note: the following summary comprises results from 2012 onwards, while the tournament was founded in 1999:

Year	Final Hosts	Final			3rd Place Match		
Year	Final Hosts	Champions	Score	Runners-up	3rd Place	Score	4th Place
2012	Auckland, New Zealand	––– Auckland	2–1	––– Southern	––– North Harbour	6–5	––– Capital
2013	Auckland, New Zealand	––– Auckland	2–2 (4–3 pen.)	––– Southern	––– Canterbury	3–2	––– Midlands
2014	Auckland, New Zealand	––– Auckland	3–0	––– Midlands	––– Canterbury	4–0	––– Southern
2015	Whangārei, New Zealand	––– Capital	0–0 (4–3 pen.)	––– Southern	––– Canterbury	3–2	––– North Harbour
2016	Whangārei, New Zealand	––– Midlands	3–1	––– Canterbury	––– Central	3–3 (3–2 pen.)	––– North Harbour
2017	Wellington, New Zealand	––– North Harbour	5–3	––– Auckland	––– Capital	6–1	––– Southern
2018	Wellington, New Zealand	––– Capital	1–1 (3–2 pen.)	––– North Harbour	––– Canterbury	6–1	––– Auckland
2019	Tauranga, New Zealand	––– North Harbour	2–1	––– Auckland	––– Canterbury	4–2	––– Capital

== Women's tournament ==
=== Women's Teams ===
The following are the women's teams at the 2017 National Hockey League:

- –– Auckland
- –– Canterbury
- –– Capital
- –– Central
- –– Midlands
- –– Northland
- –– North Harbour
- –– Southern

=== Women's Results Summaries ===
- Note: the following summary comprises results from 2008 onwards, while the tournament was founded in 1999:

Year	Final Hosts	Final			3rd Place Match		
Year	Final Hosts	Champions	Score	Runners-up	3rd Place	Score	4th Place
2008	Auckland, New Zealand	––– North Harbour	3–2	––– Auckland	––– Midlands	2–1	––– Northland
2009	Christchurch, New Zealand	––– Central	4–3	––– Midlands	––– Northland	2–1	––– Auckland
2010	Auckland, New Zealand	––– North Harbour	3–1	––– Auckland	––– Midlands	4–2	––– Canterbury
2011	Wellington, New Zealand	––– Auckland	5–2	––– Central	––– Midlands	2–1	––– Northland
2012	Auckland, New Zealand	––– Canterbury	3–1	––– Auckland	––– North Harbour	3–2	––– Midlands
2013	Auckland, New Zealand	––– Midlands	5–0	––– Capital	––– Auckland	4–0	––– Canterbury
2014	Auckland, New Zealand	––– Auckland	1–0	––– Northland	––– Midlands	2–0	––– Canterbury
2015	Whangārei, New Zealand	––– Auckland	6–0	––– Northland	––– Midlands	7–4	––– Canterbury
2016	Whangārei, New Zealand	––– Canterbury	3–2	––– North Harbour	––– Midlands	2–1	––– Auckland
2017	Wellington, New Zealand	––– Midlands	4–2	––– Northland	––– Auckland	1–1 (3–0 pen.)	––– North Harbour
2018	Wellington, New Zealand	––– North Harbour	2–0	––– Central	––– Midlands	1–0	––– Auckland
2019	Tauranga, New Zealand	––– North Harbour	2–0	––– Northland	––– Canterbury	2–1	––– Central
2022	Dunedin, New Zealand	––– Canterbury	2–1	––– North Harbour	––– Manawatū	0–0 (2–1 pen.)	––– Auckland
2023	Hamilton, New Zealand	––– Auckland	2–1	––– North Harbour	––– Canterbury	4–1	––– Manawatū

=== Women's team performances ===
Team	2010	2011	2012	2013	2014	2015	2016	2017	2018	2019	Total
–– Auckland	2nd	1st	2nd	3rd	1st	1st	4th	3rd	4th	6th	10
–– Canterbury	4th	6th	1st	4th	4th	4th	1st	6th	5th	3rd	10
–– Capital	7th	7th	6th	2nd	8th	7th	5th	7th	6th	7th	10
–– Central	6th	2nd	5th	6th	5th	6th	7th	5th	2nd	4th	10
–– Midlands	3rd	3rd	4th	1st	3rd	3rd	3rd	1st	3rd	5th	10
–– Northland	5th	4th	8th	7th	2nd	2nd	6th	2nd	7th	2nd	10
–– North Harbour	1st	5th	3rd	5th	7th	5th	2nd	4th	1st	1st	10
–– Southern	8th	8th	7th	8th	6th	8th	–	8th	8th	8th	9
Total	8	8	8	8	8	8	7	8	8	8	79

== See also ==
- New Zealand Hockey Federation
- International Hockey Federation
- hockeynz.altiusrt.com
