= Northland (field hockey team) =

- League: Ford National Hockey League
- Founded: 2000
- Colours: Canterbury Blue, Royal Blue
- Head coach: Nathaniel Joy

The Northland women's field hockey team are an amateur sports team based in New Zealand. The team competes annually in the Ford National Hockey League (NHL).

Northland have currently never won the Ford National Hockey League.

== Team roster ==
The following is the Northland team roster for the 2017 Ford NHL:

Head coaches: Nathaniel Joy

1. Nicola Howes (GK)
2. Jodie Nichol
4. Alana Laybourne
5. Sophie Morrison
6. Renee Ashton
7. Liv Crum
8. Stacey Michelsen
9. Brooke Neal
10. Melissa Simpson
11. Jess Heywood
12. Jess Pilmer
13. Jasmin McQuinn
14. Ella Gunson
15. Jade McLeod
17. Tyler Lench
18. Sarah Barnes
19. Ashlyn McBurnie
20. Hayley Maunder (GK)
