= 2006 Women's Australian Hockey League =

Tournament details
- Host country: Australia
- Dates: 7 April – 14 May
- Teams: 8
- Venue: 8 (in 8 host cities)

Final positions
- Champions: (Western Australia) WA Diamonds (3rd title)
- Runner-up: (Queensland) QLD Scorchers
- Third place: (Australian Capital Territory) Canberra Strikers

Tournament statistics
- Matches played: 52
- Goals scored: 227 (4.37 per match)
- Top scorer: (Western Australia) Emily Halliday (13 goals)
- Best player: (Australian Capital Territory) Peta Gallagher

The 2006 Women's Australian Hockey League was the 14th edition women's field hockey tournament. The tournament was held between 7 April – 14 May 2006.

WA Diamonds won the tournament for the third time after defeating QLD Scorchers 4–2 in the final. Canberra Strikers finished in third place after defeating NSW Arrows 2–1 in the third and fourth place playoff.

== Participating teams ==
- (Australian Capital Territory) Canberra Strikers
- (New South Wales) NSW Arrows
- (Northern Territory) Territory Pearls
- (Queensland) QLD Scorchers
- (South Australia) Adelaide Suns
- (Tasmania) Tassie Van Demons
- (Victoria (state)) Azuma Vipers
- (Western Australia) WA Diamonds

== Competition format ==
The 2006 Women's Australian Hockey League consisted of a single round robin format, followed by classification matches.

Teams from all 8 states and territories competed against one another throughout the pool stage. At the conclusion of the pool stage, the top four ranked teams progressed to the semi-finals, while the bottom four teams continued to the classification stage.

The first four rounds of the pool stage comprised two-legged fixtures based on aggregate scores to determine point allocation.

== Results ==
=== Preliminary round ===
==== Pool ====
Pos	Team	Pld	W	WD	LD	L	GF	GA	GD	Pts	Qualification
1	(Queensland) QLD Scorchers	11	9	0	1	1	45	9	+36	37	Semi-finals
2	(Australian Capital Territory) Canberra Strikers	11	7	2	1	1	32	19	+13	35	Semi-finals
3	(Western Australia) WA Diamonds	11	6	2	2	1	35	17	+18	30	Semi-finals
4	(New South Wales) NSW Arrows	11	5	0	1	5	25	18	+7	22	Semi-finals
5	(Victoria (state)) Azuma Vipers	11	6	1	0	4	23	17	+6	20	
6	(South Australia) Adelaide Suns	11	3	0	0	8	12	25	−13	12	
7	(Tasmania) Tassie Van Demons	11	2	0	0	9	9	47	−38	9	
8	(Northern Territory) Territory Pearls	11	1	0	0	10	8	37	−29	3	

Source: Clearing House
Rules for classification: 1) points; 2) head-to-head result; 3) goal difference; 4) matches won; 5) goals scored.

==== Fixtures ====
7 April 2006
18:00 (AWST)

WA Diamonds (Western Australia)	2–2	(New South Wales) NSW Arrows
Nelson 61'; Halliday 66'	Report	Brooks 7'; Pritchard 53'
Penalties
	2–1

Perth Hockey Stadium, Perth
Umpires:
Melissa Trivic (AUS)
Lisa Roach (AUS)

8 April 2006
13:30 (AEST)

Canberra Strikers (Australian Capital Territory)	7–3	(Tasmania) Tassie Van Demons
Gallagher 3', 63'; J. Lucas 14', 48', 54'; Vaughan 23'; Staunton 44'	Report	Jones 33'; White 43'; Paget Chaffey 65'

National Hockey Centre, Canberra
Umpires:
Deborah Brown (AUS)
Susan Ford (AUS)

8 April 2006
16:00 (AEST)

QLD Scorchers (Queensland)	5–1	(South Australia) Adelaide Suns
Hudson 8', 12'; Smith 19'; Beattie 48'; Bennett 53'	Report	Shakes 34'

State Hockey Centre, Brisbane
Umpires:
Julie Ashton-Lucy (AUS)
Aleeta Micallef (AUS)

8 April 2006
16:00 (AEST)

Azuma Vipers (Victoria (state))	3–0	(Northern Territory) Territory Pearls
Messent 13'; Merrett 16'; Gillon 22'	Report

State Netball and Hockey Centre, Melbourne
Umpires:
Catherine Mok (AUS)
Judith Barnesby (AUS)

8 April 2006
16:00 (AWST)

WA Diamonds (Western Australia)	2–1	(New South Wales) NSW Arrows
Munro 35'; Halliday 64'	Report	Close 67'

Perth Hockey Stadium, Perth
Umpires:
Lisa Roach (AUS)
Melissa Trivic (AUS)

9 April 2006
11:30 (AEST)

Canberra Strikers (Australian Capital Territory)	2–0	(Tasmania) Tassie Van Demons
Ditton 20'; Paul 32'	Report

National Hockey Centre, Canberra
Umpires:
Susan Ford (AUS)
Deborah Brown (AUS)

9 April 2006
13:00 (AEST)

Azuma Vipers (Victoria (state))	3–1	(Northern Territory) Territory Pearls
Merrett 8'; Riordan 11'; Messent 23'	Report	Bergin 25'

State Netball and Hockey Centre, Melbourne
Umpires:
Judith Barnesby (AUS)
Catherine Mok (AUS)

9 April 2006
14:00 (AEST)

QLD Scorchers (Queensland)	4–0	(South Australia) Adelaide Suns
Faulkner 14'; Bain 42'; Blyth 46'; Korner 64'	Report

State Hockey Centre, Brisbane
Umpires:
Aleeta Micallef (AUS)
Julie Ashton-Lucy (AUS)

15 April 2006
12:00 (AEST)

NSW Arrows (New South Wales)	0–3	(Queensland) QLD Scorchers
	Report	Boland 20'; Pamenter 62'; Paterson 66'

Grafton Hockey Fields, Grafton
Umpires:
Lisa Roach (AUS)
Kellie Walker (AUS)

15 April 2006
13:00 (ACST)

Adelaide Suns (South Australia)	2–1	(Australian Capital Territory) Canberra Strikers
Pickett 17'; Stacy 49'	Report	S. Taylor 65'

Pines Hockey Stadium, Adelaide
Umpires:
Peri Buckley (AUS)
Minka Woolley (AUS)

15 April 2006
17:00 (AEST)

Tassie Van Demons (Tasmania)	0–2	(Victoria (state)) Azuma Vipers
	Report	Trost 21'; Messent 56'

Tasmanian Hockey Centre, Hobart
Umpires:
Linda Gaskell (AUS)
Angela Holloway (AUS)

15 April 2006
17:00 (ACST)

Territory Pearls (Northern Territory)	1–6	(Western Australia) WA Diamonds
Syder 51'	Report	Munro 13', 49'; Halliday 41'; Smithson 45'; Riddell 60', 62'

Marrara Hockey Centre, Darwin
Umpires:
Alison Gowan (AUS)
Leah Smith (AUS)

16 April 2006
13:00 (AEST)

Tassie Van Demons (Tasmania)	0–6	(Victoria (state)) Azuma Vipers
	Report	Waley 16', 69'; Messent 25'; Morrow 33'; Austin 45'; Gillon 66'

Tasmanian Hockey Centre, Hobart
Umpires:
Angela Holloway (AUS)
Linda Gaskell (AUS)

16 April 2006
14:00 (AEST)

NSW Arrows (New South Wales)	1–4	(Queensland) QLD Scorchers
Harris 49'	Report	Hudson 17', 39'; Bain 20'; Boland 47'

Grafton Hockey Fields, Grafton
Umpires:
Kellie Walker (AUS)
Lisa Roach (AUS)

16 April 2006
15:00 (ACST)

Adelaide Suns (South Australia)	0–1	(Australian Capital Territory) Canberra Strikers
	Report	Gallagher 55'

Pines Hockey Stadium, Adelaide
Umpires:
Minka Woolley (AUS)
Peri Buckley (AUS)

16 April 2006
17:00 (ACST)

Territory Pearls (Northern Territory)	1–5	(Western Australia) WA Diamonds
Napier 22'	Report	Riddell 7'; Smithson 16'; Buckley 26'; Munro 44'; Ciallella 58'

Marrara Hockey Centre, Darwin
Umpires:
Leah Smith (AUS)
Alison Gowan (AUS)

22 April 2006
16:00 (AEST)

QLD Scorchers (Queensland)	8–0	(Tasmania) Tassie Van Demons
Hudson 4', 40'; Beattie 12'; Bain 34'; Paterson 58', 60'; Phipps 63'; Korner 65'	Report

State Hockey Centre, Brisbane
Umpires:
Annette Crandell (AUS)
Aleeta Micallef (AUS)

22 April 2006
15:00 (ACST)

Adelaide Suns (South Australia)	1–3	(Victoria (state)) Azuma Vipers
Trost 9'; Messent 27'; Merrett 43'	Report	Pickett 56'

Pines Hockey Stadium, Adelaide
Umpires:
Angela Holloway (AUS)
Minka Woolley (AUS)

22 April 2006
17:00 (ACST)

Territory Pearls (Northern Territory)	1–6	(New South Wales) NSW Arrows
Syder 52'	Report	Brooks 16', 18'; Sanders 34'; Youman 64'; Rivers 66'; James 67'

Marrara Hockey Centre, Darwin
Umpires:
Leah Smith (AUS)
Annette Asplin (AUS)

22 April 2006
17:00 (AWST)

WA Diamonds (Western Australia)	3–2 (a.e.t.)	(Australian Capital Territory) Canberra Strikers
Robertson 40'; Munro 47'; Halliday 73'	Report	Urquhart 7'; Gallagher 68'

Perth Hockey Stadium, Perth
Umpires:
Melissa Trivic (AUS)
Judith Barnesby (AUS)

23 April 2006
13:00 (ACST)

Adelaide Suns (South Australia)	1–2	(Victoria (state)) Azuma Vipers
Hammond	Report	Brook; Morrow

Pines Hockey Stadium, Adelaide
Umpires:
Angela Holloway (AUS)
Minka Woolley (AUS)

23 April 2006
15:00 (AWST)

WA Diamonds (Western Australia)	3–3	(Australian Capital Territory) Canberra Strikers
Boyce 23', 38'; Walker 26'	Report	Gallagher 20'; Mihailou 21'; Hanrahan 43'
Penalties
	4–5

Perth Hockey Stadium, Perth
Umpires:
Judith Barnesby (AUS)
Melissa Trivic (AUS)

23 April 2006
16:00 (AEST)

QLD Scorchers (Queensland)	8–0	(Tasmania) Tassie Van Demons
Paterson 6'; Smith 12'; Holmes 14'; Korner 39', 51'; Pamenter 48'; Hudson 56'; Bain 70'	Report

State Hockey Centre, Brisbane
Umpires:
Aleeta Micallef (AUS)
Annette Crandell (AUS)

23 April 2006
17:00 (ACST)

Territory Pearls (Northern Territory)	0–3	(New South Wales) NSW Arrows
	Report	Close 45'; Gale 57'; Rivers 63'

Marrara Hockey Centre, Darwin
Umpires:
Annette Asplin (AUS)
Leah Smith (AUS)

28 April 2006
12:00 (AEST)

NSW Arrows (New South Wales)	1–2	(South Australia) Adelaide Suns
James 55'	Report	Lee 36', 64'

Sydney Olympic Park, Sydney
Umpires:
Alison Gowan (AUS)
Kellie Walker (AUS)

28 April 2006
13:30 (AEST)

Canberra Strikers (Australian Capital Territory)	3–2	(Queensland) QLD Scorchers
E. Taylor 28'; Vaughan 42'; Stewart 61'	Report	Eiser 13'; Pamenter 58'

National Hockey Centre, Canberra
Umpires:
Deborah Brown (AUS)
Susan Ford (AUS)

28 April 2006
17:00 (AEST)

Azuma Vipers (Victoria (state))	1–1	(Western Australia) WA Diamonds
Trost 26'	Report	Shaw 56'
Penalties
	1–0

State Netball and Hockey Centre, Melbourne
Umpires:
Catherine Mok (AUS)
Judith Barnesby (AUS)

28 April 2006
18:00 (AEST)

Tassie Van Demons (Tasmania)	2–0	(Northern Territory) Territory Pearls
Duay 22'; White 68'	Report

Tasmanian Hockey Centre, Hobart
Umpires:
Linda Gaskell (AUS)
Angela Holloway (AUS)

29 April 2006
11:30 (AEST)

Canberra Strikers (Australian Capital Territory)	3–3	(Queensland) QLD Scorchers
Gallagher 50'; Hanrahan 60'; Paul 69'	Report	Beattie 23'; Faulkner 54'; Holmes 67'
Penalties
	5–4

National Hockey Centre, Canberra
Umpires:
Susan Ford (AUS)
Deborah Brown (AUS)

29 April 2006
12:00 (AEST)

NSW Arrows (New South Wales)	2–0	(South Australia) Adelaide Suns
Rivers 11'; Sanders 28'	Report

Sydney Olympic Park, Sydney
Umpires:
Kellie Walker (AUS)
Alison Gowan (AUS)

29 April 2006
14:00 (AEST)

Azuma Vipers (Victoria (state))	1–4	(Western Australia) WA Diamonds
Messent 17'	Report	Halliday 6'; Smithson 10'; Liddelow 39'; Shaw 51'

State Netball and Hockey Centre, Melbourne
Umpires:
Judith Barnesby (AUS)
Catherine Mok (AUS)

29 April 2006
17:00 (AEST)

Tassie Van Demons (Tasmania)	2–3	(Northern Territory) Territory Pearls
Paterson 21'; Ockenden 49'	Report	Napier 4', 65'; Caden 15'

Tasmanian Hockey Centre, Hobart
Umpires:
Minka Woolley (AUS)
Linda Gaskell (AUS)

8 May 2006
13:00 (ACST)

Territory Pearls (Northern Territory)	0–2	(South Australia) Adelaide Suns
	Report	Marles 20'; Patrick 53'

Pines Hockey Stadium, Adelaide
Umpires:
Judith Barnesby (AUS)
Angela Holloway (AUS)

8 May 2006
15:00 (ACST)

Tassie Van Demons (Tasmania)	0–5	(Western Australia) WA Diamonds
	Report	Liddelow 16', 66'; Halliday 35', 37', 41'

Pines Hockey Stadium, Adelaide
Umpires:
Lynn Cowie-McAlister (AUS)
Alison Gowan (AUS)

8 May 2006
17:00 (ACST)

NSW Arrows (New South Wales)	1–3	(Australian Capital Territory) Canberra Strikers
Harris 17'	Report	S. Taylor 19'; Mihailou 37'; Stewart 41'

Pines Hockey Stadium, Adelaide
Umpires:
Julie Ashton-Lucy (AUS)
Annette Asplin (AUS)

8 May 2006
19:00 (ACST)

Azuma Vipers (Victoria (state))	0–4	(Queensland) QLD Scorchers
	Report	Bain 21'; Boland 46', 47'; Smith 70'

Pines Hockey Stadium, Adelaide
Umpires:
Minka Woolley (AUS)
Melissa Trivic (AUS)

9 May 2006
13:00 (ACST)

Canberra Strikers (Australian Capital Territory)	3–1	(Northern Territory) Territory Pearls
Gallagher 5', 22'; E. Taylor 67'	Report	Peris 54'

Pines Hockey Stadium, Adelaide
Umpires:
Alison Gowan (AUS)
Melissa Trivic (AUS)

9 May 2006
15:00 (ACST)

Azuma Vipers (Victoria (state))	1–2	(New South Wales) NSW Arrows
Gillon 13'	Report	Rivers 2'; Simpson 70'

Pines Hockey Stadium, Adelaide
Umpires:
Annette Asplin (AUS)
Lynn Cowie-McAlister (AUS)

9 May 2006
17:00 (ACST)

QLD Scorchers (Queensland)	2–1	(Western Australia) WA Diamonds
Bennett 56'; Korner 57'	Report	Walker 9'

Pines Hockey Stadium, Adelaide
Umpires:
Judith Barnesby (AUS)
Minka Woolley (AUS)

9 May 2006
19:00 (ACST)

Adelaide Suns (South Australia)	0–2	(Tasmania) Tassie Van Demons
	Report	Paget Chaffey 4'; Jones 70'

Pines Hockey Stadium, Adelaide
Umpires:
Leah Smith (AUS)
Julie Ashton-Lucy (AUS)

11 May 2006
13:00 (ACST)

Canberra Strikers (Australian Capital Territory)	4–1	(Victoria (state)) Azuma Vipers
Urquhart 4'; Gallagher 32', 34', 48'	Report	Gillon 55'

Pines Hockey Stadium, Adelaide
Umpires:
Leah Smith (AUS)
Minka Woolley (AUS)

11 May 2006
15:00 (ACST)

NSW Arrows (New South Wales)	6–0	(Tasmania) Tassie Van Demons
Brooks 6', 37'; Hollywood 54'; Close 55'; Rivers 56'; Gale 67'	Report

Pines Hockey Stadium, Adelaide
Umpires:
Melissa Trivic (AUS)
Julie Ashton-Lucy (AUS)

11 May 2006
17:00 (ACST)

QLD Scorchers (Queensland)	2–0	(Northern Territory) Territory Pearls
Korner 9'; Lennon 50'	Report

Pines Hockey Stadium, Adelaide
Umpires:
Angela Holloway (AUS)
Kellie Walker (AUS)

11 May 2006
19:00 (ACST)

WA Diamonds (Western Australia)	4–3	(South Australia) Adelaide Suns
Halliday 3'; Liddelow 5'; Ciallella 24'; Smithson 70'	Report	Pickett 37'; Cibich 52'; Patrick 60'

Pines Hockey Stadium, Adelaide
Umpires:
Alison Gowan (AUS)
Lynn Cowie-McAlister (AUS)

=== Classification round ===
==== Fifth to eighth place classification ====
Crossover
13 May 2006
(Victoria (state)) Azuma Vipers	3
(Northern Territory) Territory Pearls	0
13 May 2006
(South Australia) Adelaide Suns	4
(Tasmania) Tassie Van Demons	1

Fifth and Sixth Place
14 May 2006
(Victoria (state)) Azuma Vipers	1
(South Australia) Adelaide Suns	2
Seventh and Eighth Place
14 May 2006
(Northern Territory) Territory Pearls	2
(Tasmania) Tassie Van Demons	1

===== Crossover =====
13 May 2006
08:30 (ACST)

Azuma Vipers (Victoria (state))	3–0	(Northern Territory) Territory Pearls
Joseph 11'; Riordan 24'; Morrow 64'	Report

Pines Hockey Stadium, Adelaide
Umpires:
Lynn Cowie-McAlister (AUS)
Kellie Walker (AUS)

13 May 2006
10:30 (ACST)

Adelaide Suns (South Australia)	4–1	(Tasmania) Tassie Van Demons
Pickett 4'; Patrick 43'; Marles 66'; Rowe 68'	Report	Paget Chaffey 10'

Pines Hockey Stadium, Adelaide
Umpires:
Leah Smith (AUS)
Annette Asplin (AUS)

===== Seventh and eighth place =====
14 May 2006
08:30 (ACST)

Territory Pearls (Northern Territory)	2–1	(Tasmania) Tassie Van Demons
Syder 24'; Chiu 32'	Report	Duay 8'

Pines Hockey Stadium, Adelaide
Umpires:
Alison Gowan (AUS)
Annette Asplin (AUS)

===== Fifth and sixth place =====
14 May 2006
10:30 (ACST)

Azuma Vipers (Victoria (state))	1–2	(South Australia) Adelaide Suns
Elzinga 20'	Report	Militz 9'; Rowe 27'

Pines Hockey Stadium, Adelaide
Umpires:
Angela Holloway (AUS)
Lynn Cowie-McAlister (AUS)

==== First to fourth place classification ====
Semi-finals
13 May 2006
(Queensland) QLD Scorchers	6
(New South Wales) NSW Arrows	2
13 May 2006
(Australian Capital Territory) Canberra Strikers	3
(Western Australia) WA Diamonds (a.e.t)	4

Final
14 May 2006
(Queensland) QLD Scorchers	2
(Western Australia) WA Diamonds	4
Third and fourth Place
14 May 2006
(New South Wales) NSW Arrows	1
(Australian Capital Territory) Canberra Strikers	2

===== Semi-finals =====
13 May 2006
12:30 (ACST)

QLD Scorchers (Queensland)	6–2	(New South Wales) NSW Arrows
Holmes 20', 67'; Faulkner 38'; Blyth 44', 64'; Bain 52'	Report	James 5'; Simpson 61'

Pines Hockey Stadium, Adelaide
Umpires:
Melissa Trivic (AUS)
Minka Woolley (AUS)

13 May 2006
14:30 (ACST)

Canberra Strikers (Australian Capital Territory)	3–4 (a.e.t.)	(Western Australia) WA Diamonds
Taylor 11', 61'; Mihailou 69'	Report	Halliday 4', 65', 76'; Munro 50'

Pines Hockey Stadium, Adelaide
Umpires:
Julie Ashton-Lucy (AUS)
Judith Barnesby (AUS)

===== Third and fourth place =====
14 May 2006
12:30 (ACST)

NSW Arrows (New South Wales)	1–2	(Australian Capital Territory) Canberra Strikers
Gale 35'	Report	Mihailou 5'; Arrold 43'

Pines Hockey Stadium, Adelaide
Umpires:
Julie Ashton-Lucy (AUS)
Melissa Trivic (AUS)

===== Final =====
14 May 2006
14:30 (ACST)

QLD Scorchers (Queensland)	2–4	(Western Australia) WA Diamonds
Hudson 23'; Beattie 40'	Report	Ciallella 21'; Liddelow 57'; Halliday 58'; Nelson 61'

Pines Hockey Stadium, Adelaide
Umpires:
Minka Woolley (AUS)
Judith Barnesby (AUS)

== Awards ==
Player of the Tournament	Top Goalscorer	Player of the Final
(Australian Capital Territory) Peta Gallagher	(Western Australia) Emily Halliday	(Western Australia) Emily Halliday

== Statistics ==
=== Final standings ===
Pos	Team	Pld	W	WD	LD	L	GF	GA	GD	Pts	Qualification
1	(Western Australia) WA Diamonds	13	7	3	2	1	43	22	+21	35	Gold Medal
2	(Queensland) QLD Scorchers	13	10	0	1	2	53	15	+38	40	Silver Medal
3	(Australian Capital Territory) Canberra Strikers	13	8	2	2	1	37	24	+13	39	Bronze Medal
4	(New South Wales) NSW Arrows	13	5	0	1	7	28	26	+2	22	
5	(South Australia) Adelaide Suns	13	5	0	0	8	18	27	−9	18	
6	(Victoria (state)) Azuma Vipers	13	7	1	0	5	27	19	+8	23	
7	(Northern Territory) Territory Pearls	13	2	0	0	11	10	41	−31	6	
8	(Tasmania) Tassie Van Demons	13	2	0	0	11	11	53	−42	9	

Source: Clearing House

=== Goalscorers ===
There were 227 goals scored in 52 matches, for an average of 4.37 goals per match.

13 goals

- (Western Australia) Emily Halliday

11 goals

- (Australian Capital Territory) Peta Gallagher

8 goals

- (Queensland) Nicole Hudson

6 goals

- (Queensland) Shannon Bain
- (Queensland) Amy Korner
- (Victoria (state)) Claire Messent
- (Western Australia) Hope Munro

5 goals

- (New South Wales) Belinda Brooks
- (New South Wales) Megan Rivers
- (Western Australia) Shelly Liddelow

4 goals

- (Australian Capital Territory) Michaela Mihailou
- (Australian Capital Territory) Sarah Taylor
- (Queensland) Wendy Beattie
- (Queensland) Danette Boland
- (Queensland) Renae Holmes
- (Queensland) Emma Paterson
- (South Australia) Bronte Pickett
- (Victoria (state)) Amanda Gillon
- (Western Australia) Sian Smithson

3 goals

- (Australian Capital Territory) Jessica Lucas
- (New South Wales) Jade Close
- (New South Wales) Samantha Gale
- (New South Wales) Kellie-Lee James
- (Northern Territory) Tate Napier
- (Northern Territory) Samantha Syder
- (Queensland) Madonna Blyth
- (Queensland) Suzanne Faulkner
- (Queensland) Lisa Pamenter
- (Queensland) Karen Smith
- (South Australia) Donna-Lee Patrick
- (Tasmania) Lis Paget-Chaffey
- (Victoria (state)) Leah Merrett
- (Victoria (state)) Kimberley Morrow
- (Victoria (state)) Renee Trost
- (Western Australia) Chantelle Ciallella
- (Western Australia) Felicity Riddell

2 goals

- (Australian Capital Territory) Clare Hanrahan
- (Australian Capital Territory) Alicia Paul
- (Australian Capital Territory) Toni Stewart
- (Australian Capital Territory) Emma Taylor
- (Australian Capital Territory) Kyralee Urquhart
- (Australian Capital Territory) Sally Vaughn
- (New South Wales) Susannah Harris
- (New South Wales) Rebecca Sanders
- (New South Wales) Melissa Simpson
- (Queensland) Jane Bennett
- (South Australia) Emma Lee
- (South Australia) Mignon Marles
- (South Australia) Melody Rowe
- (Tasmania) Eloise Duay
- (Tasmania) Jacqueline Jones
- (Tasmania) Charlotte White
- (Victoria (state)) Tegan Riordan
- (Victoria (state)) Rebecca Waley
- (Western Australia) Fiona Boyce
- (Western Australia) Ashleigh Nelson
- (Western Australia) Amy Shaw
- (Western Australia) Kimberley Walker

1 goal

- (Australian Capital Territory) Nicole Arrold
- (Australian Capital Territory) Ursula Ditton
- (Australian Capital Territory) Tonina Staunton
- (New South Wales) Kate Hollywood
- (New South Wales) Nadia Pritchard
- (New South Wales) Nicole Youman
- (Northern Territory) Terri Bergin
- (Northern Territory) Michelle Caden
- (Northern Territory) Olivia Chiu
- (Northern Territory) Emily Peris
- (Queensland) Prudence Eiser
- (Queensland) Carly Lennon
- (Queensland) Hayley Phipps
- (South Australia) Jessica Cibich
- (South Australia) Leanne Hammond
- (South Australia) Rachel Militz
- (South Australia) Jessica Shakes
- (South Australia) Elise Stacy
- (Tasmania) Lucy Ockenden
- (Tasmania) Katrina Paterson
- (Victoria (state)) Lauren Austin
- (Victoria (state)) Lauren Brook
- (Victoria (state)) Jane Elzinga
- (Victoria (state)) Stacia Joseph
- (Western Australia) Jemma Buckley
- (Western Australia) Rachel Robertson

Source: Clearing House
