= 2007 Women's Australian Hockey League =

Tournament details
- Host country: Australia
- Dates: 23 February – 8 April
- Teams: 8
- Venue: 8 (in 8 host cities)

Final positions
- Champions: (Western Australia) WA Diamonds (4th title)
- Runner-up: (Queensland) QLD Scorchers
- Third place: (Victoria (state)) VIC Vipers

Tournament statistics
- Matches played: 52
- Goals scored: 232 (4.46 per match)
- Top scorer: (Queensland) Suzie Faulkner (11 goals)
- Best player: (New South Wales) Rebecca Sanders

The 2007 Women's Australian Hockey League was the 15th edition of the women's field hockey tournament. The tournament was held between 23 February – 8 April 2007 at various venues, before culminating in Brisbane for the finals.

WA Diamonds won the tournament for the fourth time after defeating QLD Scorchers 2–1 in the final. VIC Vipers finished in third place after defeating NSW Arrows 2–1 in the third and fourth place playoff.

== Participating teams ==
- (Australian Capital Territory) Canberra Strikers
- (New South Wales) NSW Arrows
- (Northern Territory) Territory Pearls
- (Queensland) QLD Scorchers
- (South Australia) Adelaide Suns
- (Tasmania) Tassie Van Demons
- (Victoria (state)) VIC Vipers
- (Western Australia) WA Diamonds

== Competition format ==
The 2007 Women's Australian Hockey League consisted of a single round robin format, followed by classification matches.

Teams from all 8 states and territories competed against one another throughout the pool stage. At the conclusion of the pool stage, the top four ranked teams progressed to the semi-finals, while the bottom four teams continued to the classification stage.

=== Point allocation ===
Match points were allocated as follows:

· 3 points for a win
· 1 point to each team in the event of a draw
· 0 points to the loser of the match

== Results ==
=== Preliminary round ===
Pos	Team	Pld	W	WD	LD	L	GF	GA	GD	Pts	Qualification
1	(Queensland) QLD Scorchers	11	9	1	0	1	42	14	+28	38	Semi-finals
2	(Western Australia) WA Diamonds	11	8	0	0	3	39	14	+25	30	Semi-finals
3	(New South Wales) NSW Arrows	11	8	0	0	3	38	20	+18	30	Semi-finals
4	(Victoria (state)) VIC Vipers	11	5	0	1	5	23	24	−1	22	Semi-finals
5	(Australian Capital Territory) Canberra Strikers	11	3	1	3	4	22	24	−2	18	
6	(Tasmania) Tassie Van Demons	11	4	1	0	6	19	39	−20	16	
7	(Northern Territory) Territory Pearls	11	1	1	0	9	10	40	−30	8	
8	(South Australia) Adelaide Suns	11	2	0	0	9	15	33	−18	6	

Source: Clearing House
Rules for classification: 1) points; 2) head-to-head result; 3) goal difference; 4) matches won; 5) goals scored.

==== Fixtures ====
23 February 2007
18:00 (AWST)

WA Diamonds (Western Australia)	3–1	(Victoria (state)) VIC Vipers
Pamenter 3'; Smithson 9'; Taylor 65'	Report	Merrett 18'

Perth Hockey Stadium, Perth
Umpires:
Kim Kuk-hee (AUS)
Minka Woolley (AUS)

24 February 2007
15:00 (ACST)

Territory Pearls (Northern Territory)	0–3	(Tasmania) Tassie Van Demons
	Report	Douglas 2'; Duay 26', 47'

Marrara Hockey Centre, Darwin
Umpires:
Aleeta Micallef (AUS)
Julie Ashton-Lucy (AUS)

24 February 2007
14:00 (AEDT)

Canberra Strikers (Australian Capital Territory)	4–4	(Queensland) QLD Scorchers
Cornish 2'; Staunton 10'; Ditton 27'; Desmet 33'	Report	Faulkner 13'; Blyth 28', 38'; Lambert 47'
Penalties
	4–5

National Hockey Centre, Canberra
Umpires:
Deborah Brown (AUS)
Lisa Roach (AUS)

24 February 2007
16:00 (ACDT)

Adelaide Suns (South Australia)	0–2	(New South Wales) NSW Arrows
	Report	Barber 13'; Hamahona 42'

State Hockey Centre, Adelaide
Umpires:
Judith Barnesby (AUS)
Alison Gowan (AUS)

24 February 2007
16:00 (AWST)

WA Diamonds (Western Australia)	5–2	(Victoria (state)) VIC Vipers
Taylor 2', 19'; Ciallella 16'; Smithson 36'; Liddelow 53'	Report	Bond 44'; Merrett 62'

Perth Hockey Stadium, Perth
Umpires:
Kim Kuk-hee (AUS)
Minka Woolley (AUS)

25 February 2007
13:00 (AEDT)

Canberra Strikers (Australian Capital Territory)	0–5	(Queensland) QLD Scorchers
	Report	Eiser 20'; Paterson 31'; Attard 53'; Holmes 56'; Lambert 61'

National Hockey Centre, Canberra
Umpires:
Deborah Brown (AUS)
Lisa Roach (AUS)

25 February 2007
13:00 (ACDT)

Adelaide Suns (South Australia)	1–3	(New South Wales) NSW Arrows
Rowe 4'	Report	Youman 35'; Hamahona 57'; James 65'

State Hockey Centre, Adelaide
Umpires:
Judith Barnesby (AUS)
Alison Gowan (AUS)

25 February 2007
17:00 (ACST)

Territory Pearls (Northern Territory)	0–3	(Tasmania) Tassie Van Demons
	Report	Duay 2', 11'; Carr 41'

Marrara Hockey Centre, Darwin
Umpires:
Aleeta Micallef (AUS)
Julie Ashton-Lucy (AUS)

3 March 2007
13:00 (AEDT)

Tassie Van Demons (Tasmania)	2–1	(South Australia) Adelaide Suns
Douglas 12'; Perriman 51'	Report	Cibich 45'

Tasmanian Hockey Centre, Hobart
Umpires:
Minka Woolley (AUS)
Angela Holloway (AUS)

3 March 2007
14:00 (AEDT)

Canberra Strikers (Australian Capital Territory)	7–1	(Northern Territory) Territory Pearls
Ditton 4', 58'; Gallagher 11', 35'; Staunton 22', 54'; Vaughan 62'	Report	Napier 61'

National Hockey Centre, Canberra
Umpires:
Alison Gowan (AUS)
Deborah Brown (AUS)

3 March 2007
16:00 (AEDT)

VIC Vipers (Victoria (state))	3–2	(New South Wales) NSW Arrows
Trost 10'; Gillon 52'; Messent 59'	Report	Hamahona 54'; Esslemont 53'

State Netball and Hockey Centre, Melbourne
Umpires:
Judith Barnesby (AUS)
Aleeta Micallef (AUS)

3 March 2007
17:00 (AEST)

QLD Scorchers (Queensland)	2–1	(Western Australia) WA Diamonds
Drysdale 14'; Lambert 42'	Report	Taylor 45'

Queensland State Hockey Centre, Brisbane
Umpires:
Julie Ashton-Lucy (AUS)
Annette Asplin (AUS)

4 March 2007
10:00 (AEDT)

Tassie Van Demons (Tasmania)	4–3	(South Australia) Adelaide Suns
McLeod 10'; Douglas 16'; Duay 21'; Geeves 42'	Report	Harrison 14'; Phillips 50'; Rowe 55'

Tasmanian Hockey Centre, Hobart
Umpires:
Minka Woolley (AUS)
Angela Holloway (AUS)

4 March 2007
13:00 (AEDT)

Canberra Strikers (Australian Capital Territory)	0–0	(Northern Territory) Territory Pearls
	Report
Penalties
	2–3

National Hockey Centre, Canberra
Umpires:
Alison Gowan (AUS)
Deborah Brown (AUS)

4 March 2007
13:00 (AEDT)

VIC Vipers (Victoria (state))	2–3	(New South Wales) NSW Arrows
Bond 25'; Merrett 41'	Report	Youman 29', 46'; Hamahona 67'

State Netball and Hockey Centre, Melbourne
Umpires:
Judith Barnesby (AUS)
UMPIRE?

4 March 2007
15:00 (AEST)

QLD Scorchers (Queensland)	3–2	(Western Australia) WA Diamonds
Faulkner 4'; Bain 34'; Blyth 37'	Report	A. Nelson 41'; Luff 42'

Queensland State Hockey Centre, Brisbane
Umpires:
Julie Ashton-Lucy (AUS)
Annette Asplin (AUS)

10 March 2007
15:00 (AWST)

WA Diamonds (Western Australia)	6–0	(South Australia) Adelaide Suns
Munro 3'; Pamenter 9'; Taylor 53'; Halliday 55'; Smithson 65'; A. Nelson 70'	Report

Perth Hockey Stadium, Perth
Umpires:
Kim Kuk-hee (AUS)
Mink Woolley (AUS)

10 March 2007
16:00 (AEDT)

VIC Vipers (Victoria (state))	1–2 (a.e.t.)	(Australian Capital Territory) Canberra Strikers
Chau 20'	Report	S. Taylor 59', 77'

State Netball and Hockey Centre, Melbourne
Umpires:
Judith Barnesby (AUS)
Julie Ashton-Lucy (AUS)

10 March 2007
17:00 (ACST)

Territory Pearls (Northern Territory)	0–5	(Queensland) QLD Scorchers
	Report	Richards 12', 19'; Eiser 15'; Faulkner 46'; Lambert 60'

Marrara Hockey Centre, Darwin
Umpires:
Aleeta Micallef (AUS)
Annette Asplin (AUS)

10 March 2007
18:00 (AEDT)

NSW Arrows (New South Wales)	6–2	(Tasmania) Tassie Van Demons
Gale 5'; Sanders 13', 61'; Esslemont 34'; Rivers 38'; James 46'	Report	Carr 18'; Ockenden 33'

Sydney Olympic Park, Sydney
Umpires:
Lisa Roach (AUS)
Alison Gowan (AUS)

11 March 2007
13:00 (AEDT)

VIC Vipers (Victoria (state))	2–1	(Australian Capital Territory) Canberra Strikers
Trost 50'; T. Riordan 63'	Report	Staunton 18'

State Netball and Hockey Centre, Melbourne
Umpires:
Judith Barnesby (AUS)
Julie Ashton-Lucy (AUS)

11 March 2007
13:00 (AWST)

WA Diamonds (Western Australia)	4–3	(South Australia) Adelaide Suns
Kelly 20'; Halliday 26'; A. Nelson 39'; Liddelow 46'	Report	Phillips 4'; Pickett 14'; Rowe 31'

Perth Hockey Stadium, Perth
Umpires:
Kim Kuk-hee (AUS)
Mink Woolley (AUS)

11 March 2007
15:00 (AEDT)

NSW Arrows (New South Wales)	4–2	(Tasmania) Tassie Van Demons
Esslemont 20'; Hamahona 38'; Sanders 51'; Gale 60'	Report	Carr 44'; Douglas 58'

Sydney Olympic Park, Sydney
Umpires:
Lisa Roach (AUS)
Alison Gowan (AUS)

11 March 2007
15:00 (ACST)

Territory Pearls (Northern Territory)	0–3	(Queensland) QLD Scorchers
	Report	Faulkner 5'; Paterson 28'; Lambert 58'

Marrara Hockey Centre, Darwin
Umpires:
Aleeta Micallef (AUS)
Annette Asplin (AUS)

17 March 2007
13:00 (ACDT)

Adelaide Suns (South Australia)	3–1	(Northern Territory) Territory Pearls
Cibich 5'; Marles 8'; Rowe 40'	Report	Baudaskaite 69'

Alan Glassey Park, Berri
Umpires:
Judith Barnesby (AUS)
Alison Gowan (AUS)

17 March 2007
15:00 (AEDT)

Tassie Van Demons (Tasmania)	0–5	(Western Australia) WA Diamonds
	Report	Luff 15'; Pamenter 22'; Halliday 33'; Buckley 41'; Liddelow 62'

Northern Hockey Centre, Launceston
Umpires:
Minka Woolley (AUS)
Angela Holloway (AUS)

17 March 2007
15:00 (AEST)

QLD Scorchers (Queensland)	2–0	(Victoria (state)) VIC Vipers
Blyth 19'; Richards 52'	Report

Queensland State Hockey Centre, Brisbane
Umpires:
Julie Ashton-Lucy (AUS)
Aleeta Micllef (AUS)

17 March 2007
18:00 (AEDT)

NSW Arrows (New South Wales)	1–2	(Australian Capital Territory) Canberra Strikers
Gale 61'	Report	Urquhart 25'; Desmet 54'

Illawarra Hockey Stadium, Wollongong
Umpires:
Lisa Roach (AUS)
Kellie Walker (AUS)

18 March 2007
12:00 (ACDT)

Adelaide Suns (South Australia)	2–1	(Northern Territory) Territory Pearls
Galletly 7'; Phillips 45'	Report	Peris 67'

Port Adelaide Hockey Club, Adelaide
Umpires:
Judith Barnesby (AUS)
Alison Gowan (AUS)

18 March 2007
13:00 (AEDT)

Tassie Van Demons (Tasmania)	0–5	(Western Australia) WA Diamonds
	Report	Halliday 10', 40'; Pamenter 42', 59'; Buckley 48'

Northern Hockey Centre, Launceston
Umpires:
Minka Woolley (AUS)
Angela Holloway (AUS)

18 March 2007
15:00 (AEDT)

NSW Arrows (New South Wales)	4–3	(Australian Capital Territory) Canberra Strikers
Gale 9', 19'; Sanders 14'; Hamahona 64'	Report	Staunton 23'; Urquhart 42'; Gallagher 66'

Illawarra Hockey Stadium, Wollongong
Umpires:
Lisa Roach (AUS)
Kellie Walker (AUS)

18 March 2007
17:00 (AEST)

QLD Scorchers (Queensland)	0–3	(Victoria (state)) VIC Vipers
	Report	Gillon 10'; Morrow 14', 64'

Queensland State Hockey Centre, Brisbane
Umpires:
Julie Ashton-Lucy (AUS)
Aleeta Micllef (AUS)

2 April 2007
12:00 (AEST)

VIC Vipers (Victoria (state))	4–0	(Tasmania) Tassie Van Demons
Smith 13'; Morrow 57'; Messent 60'; Durajski 65'	Report

Queensland State Hockey Centre, Brisbane
Umpires:
Annette Asplin (AUS)
Alison Gowan (AUS)

2 April 2007
14:00 (AEST)

Canberra Strikers (Australian Capital Territory)	2–1	(South Australia) Adelaide Suns
Arrold 13'; Gallagher 32'	Report	Pickett 15'

Queensland State Hockey Centre, Brisbane
Umpires:
Julie Ashton-Lucy (AUS)
Angela Street (AUS)

2 April 2007
16:00 (AEST)

WA Diamonds (Western Australia)	3–1	(Northern Territory) Territory Pearls
Pamenter 3'; Halliday 10'; Liddelow 40'	Report	Marriner 68'

Queensland State Hockey Centre, Brisbane
Umpires:
Lisa Roach (AUS)
Kellie Walker (AUS)

2 April 2007
18:00 (AEST)

QLD Scorchers (Queensland)	3–2	(New South Wales) NSW Arrows
Bain 13', 47'; Lambert 58'	Report	Orr 32'; Gale 40'

Queensland State Hockey Centre, Brisbane
Umpires:
Minka Woolley (AUS)
Judith Barnesby (AUS)

3 April 2007
12:00 (AEST)

Canberra Strikers (Australian Capital Territory)	0–4	(Western Australia) WA Diamonds
	Report	Halliday 8'; Pamenter 24'; Munro 41'; A. Nelson 69'

Queensland State Hockey Centre, Brisbane
Umpires:
Judith Barnesby (AUS)
Alison Gowan (AUS)

3 April 2007
14:00 (AEST)

NSW Arrows (New South Wales)	9–1	(Northern Territory) Territory Pearls
Sanders 4', 33', 35'; James 11'; Hamahona 17'; Orr 24', 27'; Gale 45', 64'	Report	Caden 68'

Queensland State Hockey Centre, Brisbane
Umpires:
Julie Ashton-Lucy (AUS)
Linda Gaskell (AUS)

3 April 2007
16:00 (AEST)

Tassie Van Demons (Tasmania)	2–10	(Queensland) QLD Scorchers
Duay 11'; McLeod 14'	Report	Blyth 5'; Attard 9'; Lambert 26'; Faulkner 32', 49', 57', 59'; Holmes 41'; Twitt 60'; Eiser 67'

Queensland State Hockey Centre, Brisbane
Umpires:
Lisa Roach (AUS)
Kellie Walker (AUS)

3 April 2007
18:00 (AEST)

VIC Vipers (Victoria (state))	3–1	(South Australia) Adelaide Suns
O'Connell 7', 15'; Merrett 44'	Report	Rowe 27'

Queensland State Hockey Centre, Brisbane
Umpires:
Minka Woolley (AUS)
Aleeta Micallef (AUS)

5 April 2007
12:00 (AEST)

Territory Pearls (Northern Territory)	5–2	(Victoria (state)) VIC Vipers
Bergin 20'; Hammond 35', 44', 51'; Napier 69'	Report	O'Conner 9'; O'Connell 53'

Queensland State Hockey Centre, Brisbane
Umpires:
Lisa Roach (AUS)
Angela Street (AUS)

5 April 2007
14:00 (AEST)

Tassie Van Demons (Tasmania)	1–1	(Australian Capital Territory) Canberra Strikers
Geeves 16'	Report	Desmet 51'
Penalties
	3–2

Queensland State Hockey Centre, Brisbane
Umpires:
Aleeta Micallef (AUS)
Annette Asplin (AUS)

5 April 2007
16:00 (AEST)

NSW Arrows (New South Wales)	2–1	(Western Australia) WA Diamonds
Hamahona 3'; Gale 70'	Report	Smithson 17'

Queensland State Hockey Centre, Brisbane
Umpires:
Julie Ashton-Lucy (AUS)
Minka Woolley (AUS)

5 April 2007
18:00 (AEST)

QLD Scorchers (Queensland)	5–0	(South Australia) Adelaide Suns
Bain 20'; Faulkner 24', 55'; Boland 36'; Lambert 47'	Report

Queensland State Hockey Centre, Brisbane
Umpires:
Linda Gaskell (AUS)
Judith Barnesby (AUS)

=== Classification round ===
==== Fifth to eighth place classification ====
Crossover
7 April 2007
(Australian Capital Territory) Canberra Strikers	4
(South Australia) Adelaide Suns	0
7 April 2007
(Tasmania) Tassie Van Demons (a.e.t)	2
(Northern Territory) Territory Pearls	1

Fifth place
8 April 2007
(Australian Capital Territory) Canberra Strikers	3
(Tasmania) Tassie Van Demons	1
Seventh place
8 April 2007
(South Australia) Adelaide Suns	0
(Northern Territory) Territory Pearls	1

===== Crossover =====
7 April 2007
08:30 (AEST)

Canberra Strikers (Australian Capital Territory)	4–0	(South Australia) Adelaide Suns
Gallagher 8', 22', 23'; Staunton 38'	Report

Queensland State Hockey Centre, Brisbane
Umpires:
Angela Street (AUS)
Kellie Walker (AUS)

7 April 2007
10:30 (AEST)

Tassie Van Demons (Tasmania)	2–1 (a.e.t.)	(Northern Territory) Territory Pearls
Douglas 2'; Austin 81'	Report	Hammond 65'

Queensland State Hockey Centre, Brisbane
Umpires:
Alison Gowan (AUS)
Annette Asplin (AUS)

===== Seventh and eighth place =====
8 April 2007
08:30 (AEST)

Adelaide Suns (South Australia)	0–1	(Northern Territory) Territory Pearls
	Report	Peris 67'

Queensland State Hockey Centre, Brisbane
Umpires:
Angela Street (AUS)
Linda Gaskell (AUS)

===== Fifth and sixth place =====
8 April 2007
10:30 (AEST)

Canberra Strikers (Australian Capital Territory)	3–1	(Tasmania) Tassie Van Demons
Gallagher 11', 25', 44'	Report	McLeod 55'

Queensland State Hockey Centre, Brisbane
Umpires:
Aleeta Micallef (AUS)
Annette Asplin (AUS)

==== First to fourth place classification ====
Semi-finals
7 April 2007
(Queensland) QLD Scorchers	3
(Victoria (state)) VIC Vipers	0
7 April 2007
(Western Australia) WA Diamonds	3
(New South Wales) NSW Arrows	0

Final
8 April 2007
(Queensland) QLD Scorchers	1
(Western Australia) WA Diamonds	2
Third place
8 April 2007
(Victoria (state)) VIC Vipers	2
(New South Wales) NSW Arrows	1

===== Semi-finals =====
7 April 2007
12:30 (AEST)

QLD Scorchers (Queensland)	3–0	(Victoria (state)) VIC Vipers
Eiser 7'; Lambert 49'; Faulkner 61'	Report

Queensland State Hockey Centre, Brisbane
Umpires:
Lisa Roach (AUS)
Angela Holloway (AUS)

7 April 2007
14:30 (AEST)

WA Diamonds (Western Australia)	3–0	(New South Wales) NSW Arrows
Smithson 35', 50'; Kelly 37'	Report

Queensland State Hockey Centre, Brisbane
Umpires:
Julie Ashton-Lucy (AUS)
Judith Barnesby (AUS)

===== Third and fourth place =====
8 April 2007
12:30 (AEST)

VIC Vipers (Victoria (state))	2–1	(New South Wales) NSW Arrows
Trost 25'; Durajski 50'	Report	Sanders 17'

Queensland State Hockey Centre, Brisbane
Umpires:
Julie Ashton-Lucy (AUS)
Minka Woolley (AUS)

===== Final =====
8 April 2007
14:30 (AEST)

QLD Scorchers (Queensland)	1–2	(Western Australia) WA Diamonds
Lambert 21'	Report	Halliday 10'; A. Nelson 37'

Queensland State Hockey Centre, Brisbane
Umpires:
Judith Barnesby (AUS)
Lisa Roach (AUS)

== Awards ==
Player of the Tournament	Top Goalscorer	Player of the Final
(New South Wales) Rebecca Sanders	(Queensland) Suzie Faulkner	(Western Australia) Kim Walker

== Statistics ==
=== Final standings ===
Pos	Team	Pld	W	WD	LD	L	GF	GA	GD	Pts	Qualification
1st place, gold medalist(s)	(Western Australia) WA Diamonds	13	10	0	0	3	44	15	+29	36	Gold Medal
2nd place, silver medalist(s)	(Queensland) QLD Scorchers	13	10	1	0	2	46	16	+30	41	Silver Medal
3rd place, bronze medalist(s)	(Victoria (state)) VIC Vipers	13	6	0	1	6	25	28	−3	25	Bronze Medal
4	(New South Wales) NSW Arrows	13	8	0	0	5	39	25	+14	30	
5	(Australian Capital Territory) Canberra Strikers	13	5	1	3	4	29	25	+4	24	
6	(Tasmania) Tassie Van Demons	13	4	2	0	7	22	43	−21	18	
7	(Northern Territory) Territory Pearls	13	2	1	1	9	12	42	−30	12	
8	(South Australia) Adelaide Suns	13	2	0	0	11	15	38	−23	6	

Source: Clearing House

=== Goalscorers ===
There were 232 goals scored in 52 matches, for an average of 4.46 goals per match.

11 goals

- (Queensland) Suzie Faulkner

10 goals

- (Australian Capital Territory) Peta Gallagher
- (Queensland) Angela Lambert

9 goals

- (New South Wales) Samantha Gale

8 goals

- (New South Wales) Piki Hamahona
- (New South Wales) Rebecca Sanders
- (Western Australia) Emily Halliday

7 goals

- (Western Australia) Lisa Pamenter

6 goals

- (Australian Capital Territory) Tonina Staunton
- (Tasmania) Eloise Duay
- (Western Australia) Sian Smithson

5 goals

- (Queensland) Madonna Blyth
- (South Australia) Melody Rowe
- (Tasmania) Abby Douglas
- (Western Australia) Jayde Taylor
- (Western Australia) Ashleigh Nelson

4 goals

- (Northern Territory) Elisa Hammond
- (Queensland) Shannon Bain
- (Queensland) Prue Eiser
- (Victoria (state)) Leah Merrett
- (Western Australia) Shelly Liddelow

3 goals

- (Australian Capital Territory) Laura Desmet
- (Australian Capital Territory) Ursula Ditton
- (New South Wales) Jessica Esslemont
- (New South Wales) Kellie-Lee James
- (New South Wales) Meredith Orr
- (New South Wales) Nicole Youman
- (Queensland) Lauren Richards
- (South Australia) Sheree Phillips
- (Tasmania) Stacey Carr
- (Tasmania) Sofie McLeod
- (Victoria (state)) Kimberley Morrow
- (Victoria (state)) Megan O'Connell
- (Victoria (state)) Renee Trost

2 goals

- (Australian Capital Territory) Sarah Taylor
- (Australian Capital Territory) Kyralee Urquhart
- (Northern Territory) Tate Napier
- (Northern Territory) Emily Peris
- (Queensland) Teneal Attard
- (Queensland) Renae Holmes
- (Queensland) Emma Paterson
- (South Australia) Jessica Cibich
- (South Australia) Bronte Pickett
- (Tasmania) Nicole Geeves
- (Victoria (state)) Carla Bond
- (Victoria (state)) Denise Durajski
- (Victoria (state)) Amanda Gillon
- (Victoria (state)) Claire Messent
- (Western Australia) Jemma Buckley
- (Western Australia) Rheannin Kelly
- (Western Australia) Melissa Luff
- (Western Australia) Hope Munro

1 goal

- (Australian Capital Territory) Nicole Arrold
- (Australian Capital Territory) Sara Cornish
- (Australian Capital Territory) Sally Vaughan
- (New South Wales) Ebony Barber
- (New South Wales) Megan Rivers
- (Northern Territory) Asura Baudaskaite
- (Northern Territory) Teri Bergin
- (Northern Territory) Michelle Caden
- (Northern Territory) Angela Marriner
- (Queensland) Danette Boland
- (Queensland) Kirsten Drysdale
- (Queensland) Melanie Twitt
- (South Australia) Joanne Galletly
- (South Australia) Sarah Harrison
- (South Australia) Mignon Marles
- (Tasmania) Lauren Austin
- (Tasmania) Lucy Ockenden
- (Tasmania) Lena Perriman
- (Victoria (state)) Kary Chau
- (Victoria (state)) Sarah O'Connor
- (Victoria (state)) Tegan Riordan
- (Victoria (state)) Ngaire Smith
- (Western Australia) Chantelle Ciallella

Source: Clearing House
