= 2005 Women's Australian Hockey League =

Tournament details
- Host country: Australia
- Dates: 25 February – 10 April
- Teams: 8
- Venue: 8 (in 8 host cities)

Final positions
- Champions: (Queensland) QLD Scorchers (2nd title)
- Runner-up: (Western Australia) WA Diamonds
- Third place: (New South Wales) NSW Arrows

Tournament statistics
- Matches played: 52
- Goals scored: 230 (4.42 per match)
- Top scorer: (Queensland) Renae Holmes (10 goals)
- Best player: (Victoria (state)) Rachel Imison

The 2005 Women's Australian Hockey League was the 13th edition women's field hockey tournament. The tournament was held between 25 February – 10 April 2005.

QLD Scorchers won the tournament for the second time after defeating WA Diamonds 3–1 in the final. NSW Arrows finished in third place after defeating Adelaide Suns 4–0 in the third and fourth place playoff.

== Participating teams ==
- (Australian Capital Territory) Canberra Strikers
- (New South Wales) NSW Arrows
- (Northern Territory) Territory Pearls
- (Queensland) QLD Scorchers
- (South Australia) Adelaide Suns
- (Tasmania) Tassie Van Demons
- (Victoria (state)) Azuma Vipers
- (Western Australia) WA Diamonds

== Competition format ==
The 2005 Women's Australian Hockey League consisted of a single round robin format, followed by classification matches.

Teams from all 8 states and territories competed against one another throughout the pool stage. At the conclusion of the pool stage, the top four ranked teams progressed to the semi-finals, while the bottom four teams continued to the classification stage.

The first four rounds of the pool stage comprised two-legged fixtures based on aggregate scores to determine point allocation.

=== Point allocation ===
Points
W	D	L
3	1	0

In the event of a draw, a penalty shoot-out was contested, with the winner receiving a bonus point. If a shootout occurred in both instances of a two-legged fixture, a bonus point was awarded to the winner of each shoot-out.

== Results ==
=== Preliminary round ===
==== Pool ====
Pos	Team	Pld	W	D	L	GF	GA	GD	Pts	Qualification
1	(Western Australia) WA Diamonds	7	5	2	0	38	11	+27	17	Advance to Semi-Finals
2	(Queensland) QLD Scorchers	7	5	1	1	49	14	+35	16	Advance to Semi-Finals
3	(New South Wales) NSW Arrows	7	3	2	2	27	15	+12	14	Advance to Semi-Finals
4	(South Australia) Adelaide Suns	7	4	0	3	24	17	+7	13	Advance to Semi-Finals
5	(Australian Capital Territory) Canberra Strikers	7	3	1	3	25	24	+1	11	
6	(Victoria (state)) Azuma Vipers	7	3	1	3	20	20	0	10	
7	(Tasmania) Tassie Van Demons	7	0	2	5	7	45	−38	2	
8	(Northern Territory) Territory Pearls	7	0	1	6	4	48	−44	2	

Source: Clearing House
Rules for classification: 1) points; 2) goal difference; 3) matches won; 4) goals scored; 5) head-to-head result.

==== Fixtures ====
25 February 2005
18:00 (AWST)

WA Diamonds (Western Australia)	1–0	(South Australia) Adelaide Suns
Murray 78'	Report

Stadium:
Perth Hockey Stadium, Perth

25 February 2005
18:30 (AEDT)

Tassie Van Demons (Tasmania)	0–4	(Queensland) QLD Scorchers
	Report	Bain 19'; Pamenter 41'; Faulkner 63', 70'

Stadium:
Tasmanian Hockey Centre, Hobart

26 February 2005
13:00 (AEDT)

Tassie Van Demons (Tasmania)	0–5	(Queensland) QLD Scorchers
	Report	Holmes 18', 32'; Faulkner 49', 69'; Donnelly 66'

Stadium:
Tasmanian Hockey Centre, Hobart

26 February 2005
15:00 (AEDT)

Azuma Vipers (Victoria (state))	3–0	(New South Wales) NSW Arrows
Trost 18'; Durajski 29'; Gillon 32'	Report

Stadium:
State Netball and Hockey Centre, Melbourne

26 February 2005
17:00 (ACST)

Territory Pearls (Northern Territory)	1–4	(Australian Capital Territory) Canberra Strikers
Paterson 46'	Report	Urquhart 6'; Staunton 22'; Arrold 26'; Jennings 64'

Stadium:
Marrara Hockey Centre, Darwin

26 February 2005
17:00 (AWST)

WA Diamonds (Western Australia)	2–1	(South Australia) Adelaide Suns
Murray 47'; Munro 53'	Report	Cibich 38'

Stadium:
Perth Hockey Stadium, Perth

27 February 2005
14:00 (AEDT)

Azuma Vipers (Victoria (state))	2–3	(New South Wales) NSW Arrows
Chau 32'; Gillon 68'	Report	Twitt 3'; Harris 23'; Burke 42'

Stadium:
State Netball and Hockey Centre, Melbourne

27 February 2005
16:00 (ACST)

Territory Pearls (Northern Territory)	0–2	(Australian Capital Territory) Canberra Strikers
	Report	Arrold 7'; Urquhart 40'

Stadium:
Marrara Hockey Centre, Darwin

5 March 2005
12:00 (ACDT)

Adelaide Suns (South Australia)	6–1	(Tasmania) Tassie Van Demons
Cibich 11'; Patrick 15'; Anderson 24'; Harrison 30'; Cargill 46'; Pickett 67'	Report	Carr 17'

Stadium:
State Hockey Centre, Adelaide

5 March 2005
13:00 (AEDT)

NSW Arrows (New South Wales)	1–1	(Western Australia) WA Diamonds
White-Muik 55'	Report	Murray 20'
Penalties
	4–1

Stadium:
Sydney Olympic Park, Sydney

5 March 2005
16:00 (AEDT)

Canberra Strikers (Australian Capital Territory)	2–1	(Victoria (state)) Azuma Vipers
Arrold 12'; Taylor 32'	Report	Bond 41'

Stadium:
National Hockey Centre, Canberra

5 March 2005
16:00 (AEST)

QLD Scorchers (Queensland)	10–1	(Northern Territory) Territory Pearls
Skirving 12', 38'; Pamenter 19', 35'; Donnelly 43'; Korner 46', 54'; Faulkner 49'; Lennon 56'; Bain 70'	Report	Marriner 44'

Stadium:
Queensland State Hockey Centre, Brisbane

6 March 2005
14:00 (AEDT)

Canberra Strikers (Australian Capital Territory)	1–2	(Victoria (state)) Azuma Vipers
Gallagher 65'	Report	Johnston 11'; Gillon 31'

Stadium:
National Hockey Centre, Canberra

6 March 2005
14:00 (ACDT)

Adelaide Suns (South Australia)	4–1	(Tasmania) Tassie Van Demons
Lee 14'; Shakes 33', 39', 50'	Report	McLeod 61'

Stadium:
State Hockey Centre, Adelaide

6 March 2005
14:00 (AEST)

QLD Scorchers (Queensland)	5–0	(Northern Territory) Territory Pearls
Pamenter 2'; Lennon 8'; Meyer 23'; Blyth 27'; Bain 46'	Report

Stadium:
Queensland State Hockey Centre, Brisbane

6 March 2005
15:00 (AEDT)

NSW Arrows (New South Wales)	1–1	(Western Australia) WA Diamonds
Burke 58'	Report	Mansell 10'
Penalties
	5–4

Stadium:
Sydney Olympic Park, Sydney

12 March 2005
17:00 (AEDT)

Canberra Strikers (Australian Capital Territory)	1–1	(New South Wales) NSW Arrows
Staunton 59'	Report	Johnson 39'
Penalties
	3–1

Stadium:
National Hockey Centre, Canberra

12 March 2005
17:00 (AEDT)

Azuma Vipers (Victoria (state))	2–0	(Tasmania) Tassie Van Demons
Johnston 27'; Durajski 61'	Report

Stadium:
State Netball and Hockey Centre, Melbourne

12 March 2005
19:00 (ACST)

Territory Pearls (Northern Territory)	0–2	(South Australia) Adelaide Suns
	Report	Wood 37'; Ramsey 63'

Stadium:
Marrara Hockey Centre, Darwin

12 March 2005
19:00 (AWST)

WA Diamonds (Western Australia)	1–2	(Queensland) QLD Scorchers
Buswell 16'	Report	Attard 39'; Faulkner 65'

Stadium:
Perth Hockey Stadium, Perth

13 March 2005
12:00 (AEDT)

Azuma Vipers (Victoria (state))	4–1	(Tasmania) Tassie Van Demons
Merrett 6'; Gillon 10', 44'; Johnston 22'	Report	Douglas 47'

Stadium:
State Netball and Hockey Centre, Melbourne

13 March 2005
12:00 (AEDT)

Canberra Strikers (Australian Capital Territory)	3–2	(New South Wales) NSW Arrows
Arrold 23'; Taylor 30'; Gallagher 76'	Report	Gosper 20'; Harris 43'

Stadium:
National Hockey Centre, Canberra

13 March 2005
15:00 (AWST)

WA Diamonds (Western Australia)	4–3	(Queensland) QLD Scorchers
Liddelow 9'; Murray 31', 55'; Mansell 46'	Report	Allen 19'; Holmes 28', 51'

Stadium:
Perth Hockey Stadium, Perth

13 March 2005
15:00 (ACST)

Territory Pearls (Northern Territory)	1–4	(South Australia) Adelaide Suns
L. Smith 64'	Report	Shakes 13'; Rowe 22'; Pickett 40'; Marles 46'

Stadium:
Marrara Hockey Centre, Darwin

19 March 2005
15:00 (AEDT)

NSW Arrows (New South Wales)	6–1	(Northern Territory) Territory Pearls
Burke 10'; Hamahona 19', 34', 64'; Rivers 36'; Twitt 50'	Report	Bergin 20'

Stadium:
Sydney Olympic Park, Sydney

19 March 2005
17:00 (AEDT)

Tassie Van Demons (Tasmania)	1–5	(Western Australia) WA Diamonds
White 58'	Report	McGurk 3'; Smithson 23'; Buckley 33', 60'; Dwyer 58'

Stadium:
Tasmanian Hockey Centre, Hobart

19 March 2005
17:00 (ACDT)

Adelaide Suns (South Australia)	1–1	(Australian Capital Territory) Canberra Strikers
Marles 30'	Report	Taylor 60'
Penalties
	3–1

Stadium:
State Hockey Centre, Adelaide

19 March 2005
19:00 (AEST)

QLD Scorchers (Queensland)	5–1	(Victoria (state)) Azuma Vipers
Boland 7', 29'; Holmes 31', 33'; Blyth 63'	Report	Trost 45'

Stadium:
Queensland State Hockey Centre, Brisbane

20 March 2005
12:00 (AEDT)

Tassie Van Demons (Tasmania)	0–7	(Western Australia) WA Diamonds
	Report	Kelly 9'; Mansell 14'; Buckley 34', 54'; Taylor 57'; Liddelow 62'; Murray 65'

Stadium:
Tasmanian Hockey Centre, Hobart

20 March 2005
15:00 (AEDT)

NSW Arrows (New South Wales)	6–0	(Northern Territory) Territory Pearls
White-Muik 3', 61'; Sanders 5'; Simpson 25', 54'; Hamahona 62'	Report

Stadium:
Sydney Olympic Park, Sydney

20 March 2005
15:00 (ACDT)

Adelaide Suns (South Australia)	4–2	(Australian Capital Territory) Canberra Strikers
Patrick 15', 51'; Marles 26'; Rowe 52'	Report	Desmet 43'; Gallagher 49'

Stadium:
State Hockey Centre, Adelaide

20 March 2005
16:00 (AEST)

QLD Scorchers (Queensland)	5–2	(Victoria (state)) Azuma Vipers
Faulkner 7'; Lennon 8'; Holmes 26'; Alcorn 31', 50'	Report	Trost 42'; Johnston 57'

Stadium:
Queensland State Hockey Centre, Brisbane

4 April 2005
10:00 (AEST)

Canberra Strikers (Australian Capital Territory)	1–3	(Queensland) QLD Scorchers
Staunton 66'	Report	Faulkner 3'; Blyth 22'; Hudson 44'

Stadium:
National Hockey Centre, Canberra

4 April 2005
12:00 (AEST)

NSW Arrows (New South Wales)	3–0	(South Australia) Adelaide Suns
Harris 39'; Sanders 49'; Simpson 56'	Report

Stadium:
National Hockey Centre, Canberra

4 April 2005
14:00 (AEST)

Territory Pearls (Northern Territory)	0–0	(Tasmania) Tassie Van Demons
	Report
Penalties
	3–1

Stadium:
National Hockey Centre, Canberra

4 April 2005
16:00 (AEST)

Azuma Vipers (Victoria (state))	1–2	(Western Australia) WA Diamonds
Johnston 28'	Report	Mansell 36'; Murray 66'

Stadium:
National Hockey Centre, Canberra

5 April 2005
10:00 (AEST)

NSW Arrows (New South Wales)	3–2	(Queensland) QLD Scorchers
James 14'; Hamahona 15'; Twitt 39'	Report	Holmes 34'; Skirving 68'

Stadium:
National Hockey Centre, Canberra

5 April 2005
12:00 (AEST)

WA Diamonds (Western Australia)	7–0	(Northern Territory) Territory Pearls
Buckley 9'; Smithson 20', 26', 68'; Murray 32'; Liddelow 54'; Buswell 66'	Report

Stadium:
National Hockey Centre, Canberra

5 April 2005
14:00 (AEST)

Adelaide Suns (South Australia)	1–0	(Victoria (state)) Azuma Vipers
Rowe 9'	Report

Stadium:
National Hockey Centre, Canberra

5 April 2005
16:00 (AEST)

Tassie Van Demons (Tasmania)	2–7	(Australian Capital Territory) Canberra Strikers
McLeod 24', 43'	Report	Arrold 9'; Staunton 27'; Gallagher 41', 49'; Smyth 45'; Stewart 52', 65'

Stadium:
National Hockey Centre, Canberra

7 April 2005
10:00 (AEST)

Territory Pearls (Northern Territory)	0–2	(Victoria (state)) Azuma Vipers
	Report	N. Smith 18'; Trost 41'

Stadium:
National Hockey Centre, Canberra

7 April 2005
12:00 (AEST)

QLD Scorchers (Queensland)	5–1	(South Australia) Adelaide Suns
Hudson 24'; Alcorn 30'; Korner 62', 66', 69'	Report	Patrick 40'

Stadium:
National Hockey Centre, Canberra

7 April 2005
14:00 (AEST)

NSW Arrows (New South Wales)	1–1	(Tasmania) Tassie Van Demons
Brooks 70'	Report	Scott 70'
Penalties
	5–3

Stadium:
National Hockey Centre, Canberra

7 April 2005
16:00 (AEST)

Canberra Strikers (Australian Capital Territory)	1–7	(Western Australia) WA Diamonds
Smyth 50'	Report	Hall 5'; Halliday 32'; Kelly 43'; Liddelow 45'; Buckley 56', 69'; Mansell 70'

Stadium:
National Hockey Centre, Canberra

=== Classification round ===
==== Fifth to eighth place classification ====
Crossover
9 April 2005
(Australian Capital Territory) Canberra Strikers	7
(Tasmania) Tassie Van Demons	0
9 April 2005
(Victoria (state)) Azuma Vipers	3
(Northern Territory) Territory Pearls	1

Fifth Place
10 April 2005
(Australian Capital Territory) Canberra Strikers (pen.)	2 (4)
(Victoria (state)) Azuma Vipers	2 (2)
Seventh Place
10 April 2005
(Tasmania) Tassie Van Demons	0
(Northern Territory) Territory Pearls	1

===== Crossover =====
9 April 2005
10:00

Azuma Vipers (Victoria (state))	3–1	(Northern Territory) Territory Pearls
Gillon 46', 70'; Trost 59'	Report	Paterson 5'

Stadium:
National Hockey Centre, Canberra

9 April 2005
12:30

Canberra Strikers (Australian Capital Territory)	7–0	(Tasmania) Tassie Van Demons
Taylor 15'; Smyth 25', 35'; Desmet 29'; Gallagher 41', 62'; Jennings 64'	Report

Stadium:
National Hockey Centre, Canberra

===== Seventh and eighth place =====
10 April 2005
10:00

Tassie Van Demons (Tasmania)	0–1	(Northern Territory) Territory Pearls
	Report	Paterson 6'

Stadium:
National Hockey Centre, Canberra

===== Fifth and sixth place =====
10 April 2005
12:30

Canberra Strikers (Australian Capital Territory)	2–2	(Victoria (state)) Azuma Vipers
Stewart 21'; Desmet 47'	Report	N. Smith 31', 67'
Penalties
	4–2

Stadium:
National Hockey Centre, Canberra

==== First to fourth place classification ====
Semi-finals
9 April 2005
(Western Australia) WA Diamonds	5
(South Australia) Adelaide Suns	1
9 April 2005
(Queensland) QLD Scorchers	5
(New South Wales) NSW Arrows	1

Final
10 April 2005
(Western Australia) WA Diamonds	1
(Queensland) QLD Scorchers	3
Third Place
10 April 2005
(South Australia) Adelaide Suns	0
(New South Wales) NSW Arrows	4

===== Semi-finals =====
9 April 2005
15:00

QLD Scorchers (Queensland)	5–1	(New South Wales) NSW Arrows
Hudson 31'; Holmes 42', 49'; Faulkner 52'; Bennett 60'	Report	James 3'

Stadium:
National Hockey Centre, Canberra

9 April 2005
17:30

WA Diamonds (Western Australia)	5–1	(South Australia) Adelaide Suns
Walker 32'; Liddelow 36'; Munro 40'; Smithson 52'; Murray 68'	Report	Pickett 17'

Stadium:
National Hockey Centre, Canberra

==== Third and fourth place ====
10 April 2005
15:00

Adelaide Suns (South Australia)	0–4	(New South Wales) NSW Arrows
	Report	Gosper 37'; Hamahona 42', 45'; Brooks 64'

Stadium:
National Hockey Centre, Canberra

===== Final =====
10 April 2005
17:30

WA Diamonds (Western Australia)	1–3	(Queensland) QLD Scorchers
Halliday 62'	Report	Alcorn 6'; Hudson 12'; Korner 54'

Stadium:
National Hockey Centre, Canberra

== Awards ==
Player of the Tournament	Top Goalscorer	Player of the Final	Play the Whistle
(Victoria (state)) Rachel Imison	(Queensland) Renae Holmes	(Queensland) Madonna Blyth	(South Australia) Adelaide Suns

== Statistics ==
=== Final standings ===
Pos	Team	Pld	W	D	L	GF	GA	GD	Pts	Qualification
1st place, gold medalist(s)	(Queensland) QLD Scorchers	9	7	1	1	57	16	+41	22	Gold Medal
2nd place, silver medalist(s)	(Western Australia) WA Diamonds	9	6	2	1	44	15	+29	20	Silver Medal
3rd place, bronze medalist(s)	(New South Wales) NSW Arrows	9	4	2	3	32	20	+12	17	Bronze Medal
4	(South Australia) Adelaide Suns	9	4	0	5	25	26	−1	13	
5	(Australian Capital Territory) Canberra Strikers	9	4	2	3	34	26	+8	16	
6	(Victoria (state)) Azuma Vipers	9	4	2	3	25	23	+2	14	
7	(Northern Territory) Territory Pearls	9	1	1	7	6	51	−45	5	
8	(Tasmania) Tassie Van Demons	9	0	2	7	7	53	−46	2	

Source: Clearing House

=== Goalscorers ===
There were 230 goals scored in 52 matches, for an average of 4.42 goals per match.

10 goals

- (Queensland) Renae Holmes

9 goals

- (Queensland) Suzanne Faulkner
- (Western Australia) Breanna Murray

7 goals

- (Australian Capital Territory) Peta Gallagher
- (New South Wales) Piki Hamahona
- (Victoria (state)) Amanda Gillon
- (Western Australia) Jemma Buckley

6 goals

- (Queensland) Amy Korner

5 goals

- (Australian Capital Territory) Nicole Arrold
- (Victoria (state)) Tiffany Johnston
- (Victoria (state)) Renee Trost
- (Western Australia) Shelly Liddelow
- (Western Australia) Kia Mansell
- (Western Australia) Sian Smithson

4 goals

- (Australian Capital Territory) Emma Smyth
- (Australian Capital Territory) Tonina Staunton
- (Australian Capital Territory) Sarah Taylor
- (Queensland) Wendy Alcorn
- (Queensland) Nicole Hudson
- (Queensland) Lisa Pamenter
- (South Australia) Jessica Shakes
- (South Australia) Donna-Lee Patrick

3 goals

- (Australian Capital Territory) Laura Desmet
- (Australian Capital Territory) Toni Stewart
- (New South Wales) Hannah Burke
- (New South Wales) Susannah Harris
- (New South Wales) Molly Simpson
- (New South Wales) Melanie Twitt
- (New South Wales) Nicole White-Muik
- (Northern Territory) Emma Paterson
- (Queensland) Shannon Bain
- (Queensland) Madonna Blyth
- (Queensland) Carly Lennon
- (Queensland) Angela Skirving
- (South Australia) Mignon Marles
- (South Australia) Bronte Pickett
- (South Australia) Melody Rowe
- (Tasmania) Sofie McLeod
- (Victoria (state)) Ngaire Smith

2 goals

- (Australian Capital Territory) Danielle Jennings
- (Australian Capital Territory) Kyralee Urquhart
- (New South Wales) Belinda Brooks
- (New South Wales) Jennifer Gosper
- (New South Wales) Kellie-Lee James
- (New South Wales) Rebecca Sanders
- (Queensland) Danette Boland
- (Queensland) Phoebe Donnelly
- (South Australia) Jessica Cibich
- (Victoria (state)) Denise Durajski
- (Western Australia) Shayni Buswell
- (Western Australia) Emily Halliday
- (Western Australia) Rheannin Kelly
- (Western Australia) Hope Munro

1 goal

- (New South Wales) Fiona Johnson
- (New South Wales) Megan Rivers
- (Northern Territory) Teri Bergin
- (Northern Territory) Angela Marriner
- (Northern Territory) Leah Smith
- (Queensland) Renee Allen
- (Queensland) Teneal Attard
- (Queensland) Jane Bennett
- (Queensland) Emma Meyer
- (South Australia) Rebecca Anderson
- (South Australia) Heather Cargill
- (South Australia) Sarah Harrison
- (South Australia) Emma Lee
- (South Australia) Alison Ramsey
- (South Australia) Kylie Wood
- (Tasmania) Isabel Carr
- (Tasmania) Abby Douglas
- (Tasmania) Victoria Scott
- (Tasmania) Charlotte White
- (Victoria (state)) Carla Bond
- (Victoria (state)) Kary Chau
- (Victoria (state)) Leah Merrett
- (Western Australia) Stephanie Dwyer
- (Western Australia) Mia Hall
- (Western Australia) Kobie McGurk
- (Western Australia) Jayde Taylor
- (Western Australia) Kim Walker

Source: Clearing House
