= 2001 Women's Hockey Junior World Cup squads =

This article lists the confirmed squads for the 2001 Women's FIH Hockey Junior World Cup tournament held in Greater Buenos Aires, Argentina, between 14 and 26 May 2001.

== Pool A ==
=== India ===
Head coach: Satinderpal Singh Walia

1. Rebika Devi (GK)
2. Pushpa Pradhan
3. Suman Bala
4. Nilima Kujur
5. Agnecia Lugun
6. Gurpreet Kaur
7. Masira Surin
8. Saba Anjum
9. Annarita Kerketta
10. Mamta Kharab (C)
11. Adeline Kerketta
12. Asrita Toppo
13. Sanggai Chanu
14. Pakpi Devi
15. Subhadra Pradhan
16. Deepika Murthy (GK)
17. Manju Phalswal
18. Simarjeet Kaur

=== Netherlands ===
Head coach: Maarten Gehner

1. Marlieke van de Pas (GK)
2. Lieke Schellekens
3. Anne-Maaike Elsen
4. Eveline Wisse Smit
5. Evelyne Oostinga
6. Nienke van Ruiten
7. Jolanda Clemens
8. Markje Hoekstra
9. Eliane Schreuder
10. Maartje Scheepstra (C)
11. Aukje de Groot
12. Belle van Meer
13. Kim Lammers
14. Marjolijn Spruijt (GK)
15. Terry Noorlander
17. Emmelien Spek
18. Claire Visser
19. Tineke Maassen

=== New Zealand ===
Head coach: Jude Rawcliffe

1. Gene Walker
2. Sheree Phillips
3. Laura Douglas
4. Piki Hamahona
5. Priya Bhikha
6. Amanda Christie
7. Pania Mateparae
8. Jessica Bagley
9. Stacey Carr
10. Elizabeth Igasan (C)
11. Melody Rowe
13. Kristy Redfern
14. Leigh Grimwood
15. Anita Wawatai (GK)
16. Beth Jurgeleit (GK)
17. Kate Saunders

=== United States ===
Head coach: Tess Ellis

2. Carey Fetting-Smith
3. Abbey Woolley
4. Maria Whitehead
5. Kristi Gannon (C)
8. Meredith Keller
10. Carissa Messimer
11. Tiffany Leister
12. April Fronzoni
13. Ilvy Friebe
15. Kelly Baril (GK)
16. Abby Martin
21. Kelly Dostal
22. Dina Rizzo
23. Stephanie Fuller
25. Amy Tran (GK)
26. Jessica Coleman

== Pool B ==
=== Australia ===
Head coach: Mark Hager

1. Wendy Alcorn
2. Sian Smithson
3. Rebecca Sanders
4. Shayni Buswell
5. Katrina Paterson
6. Mignon Marles
7. Donna-Lee Patrick
8. Renee Allen
9. Sarah Taylor
10. Leanne Hammond (GK)
11. Renee Trost
12. Patrice Donnelly
13. Hope Brown
15. Denise Durajski
16. Toni Cronk (GK)
17. Megan Staunton
18. Nicole Arrold
24. Angela Skirving (C)

=== Chile ===
Head coach: (Germany) Mieke Albers

1. Andra Sánchez
2. Carolina Pinto (GK)
3. Valentina Martín
4. Constanza Abud
5. Paula Infante
6. Camila Infante
7. Daniela Infante (C)
8. Consuelo Díaz Valdéz
9. Sandra Wenz
10. Veronica Walbaum
11. Carolina Varas
12. Javiera Villagra
13. Carolina García
14. Fernanda Rodríguez
15. Michelle Wilson
16. Fernanda Arancibia
17. María José Fernández
18. Sophia Rengifo (GK)

=== Germany ===
Head coach: Heino Knuf

1. Yvonne Frank (GK)
2. Barbara Vogel (GK)
3. Christina Schütze
4. Meike Achtmann
5. Cora Eilhardt
6. Mandy Haase
7. Anke Kühn
8. Janina Totzke
9. Inga Matthes
11. Henrike Schneefuss
12. Birgit Borkamm
13. Ulrike Patschkowski
14. Anneke Böhmert
15. Sibylle Hinsken
16. Fanny Rinne (C)
17. Dinah Hartmann
18. Katrin Eidinger
22. Laura Scharowsky

== Pool C ==
=== Argentina ===
Head coach: Alejandra Palma

1. Angela Cattaneo (GK)
2. Claudia Burkart
3. Victoria Baetti
4. Juliana Carboni
5. Florencia D'Elía
6. Matilde Canavosio
7. Carolina Armani
8. Mariné Russo (C)
9. Natalí Doreski
10. Soledad García
11. Cecilia del Carril
12. Laura Aladro (GK)
13. Lara Vargas
14. Marta Reina
15. Martina Arconstanzo
16. Mariana Albarracín
17. Vanina Raymondo
18. Belén Simmermacher

=== South Africa ===
Head coach: Ros Howell

1. Grazjyna Engelbrecht (GK)
2. Nastasjia Erasmus (GK)
3. Taryn Hosking
4. Kim Tucker
5. Kate Hector
6. Elfrieda Maas
7. Melissa Rankin
8. Marsha Marescia (C)
9. Leanne McNally
10. Sharne Wehmeyer
11. Sophie Mayer
12. Bronwyn Ross
13. Marissa Alves
14. Lizette Bester
15. Nadine Botes
16. Elsabe Lombard
17. Taryn Laurie
18. Tsoanelo Pholo

=== Spain ===
Head coach: (Netherlands) Jack Holtman

1. Isabel Barguño (GK)
2. Oihane Fernández (GK)
3. Ivet Muñoz
4. Gemma Busquets
5. Marta Giménez-Casas
6. Berta Sánchez
7. Irati Escribano
8. Marta Prat
9. María Romagosa
10. Silvia Bonastre
11. Barbara Malda (C)
12. Núria Planas
13. Gemma Martínez
14. Laia Yurss
15. Miriam Fábregas
16. Maider Luengo
17. Pilar Sánches
18. Esther Termens

=== Wales ===
Head coach: Caroline Frye

1. Margaret Rees (GK)
2. Sarah Fellows (GK)
4. Lyndsay Cole
5. Nia Fowler
6. Sian Fowler
7. Natalie Hardwicke
8. Carys Hopkins
9. Philippa Jones
10. Caroline Marsden
11. Kelly Martin
12. Sian Nutting
13. Amanda Roberts
14. Delyth Sharples
15. Sarah Thomas
16. Abigail Welsford (C)
17. Francine Williams

== Pool D ==
=== Canada ===
Head coach: Sharon Creelman

1. Emily Menzies (GK)
2. Katie McNeul (GK)
3. Laura Balakshin
4. Alison Johnstone
5. Maureen O'Connor
6. Ashley Reaburn (C)
7. Kate Lindsay
8. Stephanie Jameson
9. Julia Morton
10. Stephanie Quinn
11. Lucy Shaw
12. Robin Leslie
13. Lauren MacLean
14. Erin Morton
15. Suzanne Simpson
16. Nicole Perry
17. Alisa Carey
18. Elizabeth Roberts

=== England ===
Head coach: Pete Nicholson

1. Karen Wells
2. Danielle Barnes
3. Frances Houslop
4. Stephanie Farmer
5. Kate Henrichs (GK)
6. Rebecca Alltree
7. Rachel Walsh
8. Imogen Robertson
9. Nadine Merabi
10. Alexandra Danson
11. Kate Walsh (C)
12. Isabel Palmer
13. Helen Richardson
14. Rebecca-Lee Smith
15. Anne Panter
16. Joanne Ellis
17. Evie van Poortuliet (GK)
18. Annalisa Bishop

=== Russia ===
Head coach: Vladimir Kobzev

1. Irina Arngold (GK)
2. Alla Chtraukh (GK)
3. Efimia Boutina
4. Svetlana Romanova
5. Tatiana Saxon
6. Olga Axentieva
7. Olga Chentsova (C)
8. Maria Terekhova
9. Ioulia Chatova
10. Lidia Tchoukareva
11. Olga Perepelitchenko
12. Svetlana Crigorieva
13. Ioulia Jilina
14. Nadejda Timachkova
15. Tatiana Bougakova
16. Tatiana Bezrouk
17. Sofia Obrohbova
18. Anna Radomskaia

=== South Korea ===
Head coach: Han Jin-su

1. Lim Ju-young (GK)
2. Kim Yun-mi
3. Lee Jin-hee
4. Kim Jung-hee
5. Lee Seon-ok (C)
6. Kang Bo-kyung
7. Han Yu-kyung
8. Kim Mi-ok
9. Kang Na-young
10. Ko Kwang-min
11. Oh Ko-woon
12. Kim Jin-kyoung
13. Oh In-sook
14. Kim Mi-seon
15. Park Seon-mi
16. Lee Jung-hyun
17. Kim Hyun-ae (GK)
18. Park Jeong-sook
