= 2001 Women's Hockey Junior World Cup =

International field hockey competition

Junior Hockey World Cup 2001

Tournament details
- Host country: Argentina
- City: Greater Buenos Aires
- Dates: 14–26 May 2001
- Teams: 15
- Venue: 2

Final positions
- Champions: South Korea (1st title)
- Runner-up: Argentina
- Third place: Australia

Tournament statistics
- Matches played: 56
- Goals scored: 195 (3.48 per match)
- Top scorer: (South Korea) Kim Yun-Mi (12 goals)
- Best player: (Argentina) Mariné Russo

The 2001 Women's Hockey Junior World Cup was the 4th edition of the FIH Hockey Junior World Cup. It was held from 14–26 May 2001 across two venues in Argentina; the Estadio Nacional de Hockey in Quilmes, and the CeNARD in Buenos Aires.

South Korea won the tournament for the first time, defeating Argentina 4–3 in a penalty shoot-out after the gold medal match finished as a 2–2 draw. The Netherlands were the defending champions, however they lost 2–0 to Australia in the bronze medal match.

== Qualification ==
Each continental federation received a number of quotas depending on the FIH World Rankings for teams qualified through their junior continental championships. Alongside the host nation, 15 teams competed in the tournament.

Dates	Event	Location	Qualifier(s)
Host nation			Argentina
30 March–2 April 2000	Junior Oceania Cup	Canberra, Australia	Australia; New Zealand^{1}
13–23 April 2000	Pan American Junior Championship	Bridgetown, Barbados	Canada; Chile; United States
6–13 May 2000	Junior Asia Cup	Kuala Lumpur, Malaysia	~~China~~^{2} India; South Korea
2000	EuroHockey Junior Championship	Leipzig, Germany	England; Germany; Netherlands; Russia; Spain; ~~Ukraine~~^{3} Wales^{2}
2000	Junior Africa Cup for Nations	Johannesburg, South Africa	South Africa

^1 – Due to the lack of other competing teams in the Oceania qualifier, New Zealand were invited to compete despite losing to Australia.
^2 – China withdrew from participating prior to the tournament; the first reserve team was Wales, thanks to their seventh place finish at the European qualifier.
^3 – Ukraine withdrew from participating prior to the tournament, however they were not replaced by the second reserve team.

== Venues ==
Greater Buenos Aires
2001 Women's Hockey Junior World Cup is located in Greater Buenos Aires	Quilmes
2001 Women's Hockey Junior World Cup is located in Greater Buenos Aires	Estadio Nacional de Hockey
2001 Women's Hockey Junior World Cup is located in Greater Buenos Aires	Buenos Aires
2001 Women's Hockey Junior World Cup is located in Greater Buenos Aires	CeNARD

== Results ==
=== First round ===
==== Pool A ====
Pos	Team	Pld	W	D	L	GF	GA	GD	Pts	Qualification
1	Netherlands	3	3	0	0	9	1	+8	9	Medal round
2	New Zealand	3	1	1	1	4	3	+1	4	Medal round
3	India	3	1	1	1	2	1	+1	4	
4	United States	3	0	0	3	1	11	−10	0	

Rules for classification: 1) points; 2) goal difference; 3) goals scored; 4) head-to-head result.

14 May 2001
10:00

United States	1–3	New Zealand
Coleman 19'	Report	Igasan 10'; Christie 15'; Carr 50'

Estadio Nacional de Hockey, Quilmes

14 May 2001
13:00

India	0–1	Netherlands
	Report	Van Ruiten 57'

Estadio Nacional de Hockey, Quilmes
Umpires:
Gina Spitaleri (ITA)
Ann van Dyk (CAN)

15 May 2001
17:00

India	2–0	United States
Kerketta 39', 40'	Report

Estadio Nacional de Hockey, Quilmes
Umpires:
Annette Wilson (SCO)
Carolina de la Fuente (ARG)

15 May 2001
19:00

Netherlands	2–1	New Zealand
Van Ruiten 33'; Spek 35'	Report	Christie 20'

Estadio Nacional de Hockey, Quilmes
Umpires:
Lourdes Santiago (ESP)
Margaret Hunnaball (ENG)

17 May 2001
16:00

Netherlands	6–0	United States
De Groot 8', 28', 48'; Lammers 15'; Van Ruiten 38', 69'	Report

Estadio Nacional de Hockey, Quilmes
Umpires:
Soledad Iparraguirre (ARG)
Alicia Takeda (MEX)

17 May 2001
18:00

New Zealand	0–0	India
	Report

Estadio Nacional de Hockey, Quilmes
Umpires:
Lourdes Santiago (ESP)
Heike Malina (GER)

==== Pool B ====
Pos	Team	Pld	W	D	L	GF	GA	GD	Pts	Qualification
1	Australia	2	2	0	0	3	1	+2	6	Medal round
2	Germany	2	1	0	1	7	1	+6	3	Medal round
3	Chile	2	0	0	2	1	9	−8	0	

Rules for classification: 1) points; 2) goal difference; 3) goals scored; 4) head-to-head result.

15 May 2001
15:00

Australia	2–1	Chile
Buswell 11'; Allen 44'	Report	García 53'

Estadio Nacional de Hockey, Quilmes
Umpires:
Soledad Iparraguirre (ARG)
Tetyana Kaltypan (UKR)

16 May 2001
17:00

Germany	0–1	Australia
	Report	Patrick 66'

Estadio Nacional de Hockey, Quilmes
Umpires:
Kazuko Yasueda (JPN)
Ann van Dyk (CAN)

18 May 2001
11:00

Chile	0–7	Germany
	Report	Patschkowski 17', 47', 50'; Rinne 20'; Böhmert 26', 40'; Hinsken 69'

Estadio Nacional de Hockey, Quilmes
Umpires:
Judith Brinsfield (USA)
Lourdes Santiago (ESP)

==== Pool C ====
Pos	Team	Pld	W	D	L	GF	GA	GD	Pts	Qualification
1	Argentina (H)	3	3	0	0	13	0	+13	9	Medal round
2	South Africa	3	2	0	1	4	5	−1	6	Medal round
3	Spain	3	1	0	2	3	8	−5	3	
4	Wales	3	0	0	3	0	7	−7	0	

Rules for classification: 1) points; 2) goal difference; 3) goals scored; 4) head-to-head result.
(H) Hosts

14 May 2001
15:30

Wales	0–2	South Africa
	Report	McNally 6'; Wehmeyer 17'

Estadio Nacional de Hockey, Quilmes
Umpires:
Cecilia Valenzuela (CHI)
Peri Buckley (AUS)

14 May 2001
17:30

Argentina	6–0	Spain
Del Carril 14'; Burkart 17', 28'; Arcostanzo 44'; Armani 45'; Russo 67'	Report

Estadio Nacional de Hockey, Quilmes
Umpires:
Julie Ashton-Lucy (AUS)
Mary Power (IRE)

16 May 2001
09:00

Spain	1–2	South Africa
Giménez-Casas 65'	Report	Mayer 58'; McNally 62'

Estadio Nacional de Hockey, Quilmes
Umpires:
Julie Ashton-Lucy (AUS)
Cecilia Valenzuela (CHI)

16 May 2001
11:00

Argentina	3–0	Wales
Russo 18', 32'; Burkart 48'	Report

Estadio Nacional de Hockey, Quilmes
Umpires:
Peri Buckley (AUS)
Tetyana Kaltypan (UKR)

17 May 2001
12:00

Spain	2–0	Wales
P. Sánchez 18'; Romagosa 26'	Report

Estadio Nacional de Hockey, Quilmes

17 May 2001
14:00

South Africa	0–4	Argentina
	Report	Del Carril 6', 65'; Burkart 21'; D'Elía 70'

Estadio Nacional de Hockey, Quilmes
Umpires:
Margaret Hunnanbal (ENG)
Judith Brinsfield (USA)

==== Pool D ====
Pos	Team	Pld	W	D	L	GF	GA	GD	Pts	Qualification
1	South Korea	3	3	0	0	19	0	+19	9	Medal round
2	England	3	2	0	1	5	1	+4	6	Medal round
3	Canada	3	1	0	2	2	12	−10	3	
4	Russia	3	0	0	3	1	14	−13	0	

Rules for classification: 1) points; 2) goal difference; 3) goals scored; 4) head-to-head result.

15 May 2001
09:00

Canada	0–3	England
	Report	Robertson 9', 40'; Richardson 13'

Estadio Nacional de Hockey, Quilmes
Umpires:
Judith Brinsfield (USA)
Alicia Takeda (MEX)

15 May 2001
11:00

South Korea	10–0	Russia
Ko 5', 57'; Park J. 18'; Kim Y. 32', 35', 47', 68'; Han 44'; Oh 52'; Lee S. 65'	Report

Estadio Nacional de Hockey, Quilmes
Umpires:
Sarah Garnett (NZL)
Heike Malina (GER)

16 May 2001
13:00

England	2–0	Russia
Bishop 9'; K. Walsh 65'	Report

Estadio Nacional de Hockey, Quilmes
Umpires:
Carolina de la Fuente (ARG)
Gina Spitaleri (ITA)

16 May 2001
15:00

Canada	0–8	South Korea
	Report	Park J. 8'; Kim Y. 14', 44', 48', 69'; Kim M. 53', 63'; Kim A. 58'

Estadio Nacional de Hockey, Quilmes
Umpires:
Mary Power (IRE)
Marelize de Klerk (RSA)

18 May 2001
13:00

Russia	1–2	Canada
Tchoukareva 63'	Report	Reaburn 55'; MacLean 65'

Estadio Nacional de Hockey, Quilmes
Umpires:
Heike Malina (GER)
Margaret Hunnaball (ENG)

18 May 2001
15:00

England	0–1	South Korea
	Report	Kim Y. 11'

Estadio Nacional de Hockey, Quilmes
Umpires:
Peri Buckley (AUS)
Mary Power (IRE)

=== Medal round ===
==== Pool E ====
Pos	Team	Pld	W	D	L	GF	GA	GD	Pts	Qualification
1	Netherlands	3	2	0	1	6	2	+4	6	Semi-finals
2	South Korea	3	2	0	1	6	3	+3	6	Semi-finals
3	Germany	3	1	1	1	3	3	0	4	
4	South Africa	3	0	1	2	1	8	−7	1	

Rules for classification: 1) points; 2) goal difference; 3) goals scored; 4) head-to-head result.

19 May 2001
13:00

Germany	0–2	Netherlands
	Report	Wisse Smit 9'; De Groot 27'

Estadio Nacional de Hockey, Quilmes
Umpires:
Kazuko Yasueda (JPN)
Carolina de la Fuente (ARG)

19 May 2001
17:00

South Africa	0–4	South Korea
	Report	Kim Y. 27'; Han 48'; Park J. 68'; Oh 69'

Estadio Nacional de Hockey, Quilmes
Umpires:
Annette Wilson (ENG)
Julie Ashton-Lucy (AUS)

20 May 2001
17:00

Netherlands	3–0	South Africa
Scheepstra 45'; De Groot 51'; Wisse Smit 58'	Report

Estadio Nacional de Hockey, Quilmes
Umpires:
Soledad Iparraguirre (ARG)
Alicia Takeda (MEX)

21 May 2001
15:00

South Korea	0–2	Germany
	Report	Rinne 10', 26'

Estadio Nacional de Hockey, Quilmes
Umpires:
Soledad Iparraguirre (ARG)
Julie Ashton-Lucy (AUS)

22 May 2001
17:00

Germany	1–1	South Africa
Hinsken 50'	Report	Mayer 52'

Estadio Nacional de Hockey, Quilmes

22 May 2001
19:00

Netherlands	1–2	South Korea
Van Ruiten 70'	Report	Kang 16'; Park J. 26'

Estadio Nacional de Hockey, Quilmes
Umpires:
Julie Ashton-Lucy (AUS)
Carolina de la Fuente (ARG)

==== Pool F ====
Pos	Team	Pld	W	D	L	GF	GA	GD	Pts	Qualification
1	Australia	3	3	0	0	7	2	+5	9	Semi-finals
2	Argentina (H)	3	2	0	1	5	1	+4	6	Semi-finals
3	England	3	1	0	2	4	9	−5	3	
4	New Zealand	3	0	0	3	3	7	−4	0	

Rules for classification: 1) points; 2) goal difference; 3) goals scored; 4) head-to-head result.
(H) Hosts

19 May 2001
11:00

New Zealand	1–2	Australia
Saunders 17'	Report	Smithson 13'; Arrold 32'

Estadio Nacional de Hockey, Quilmes
Umpires:
Gina Spitaleri (ITA)
Carolina de la Fuente (ARG)

19 May 2001
19:00

Argentina	3–0	England
Raimondo 32'; Arcostanzo 42', 57'	Report

Estadio Nacional de Hockey, Quilmes
Umpires:
Marelize de Klerk (RSA)
Sarah Garnett (NZL)

20 May 2001
19:00

Argentina	2–0	New Zealand
Raimondo 21'; Arcostanzo 47'	Report

Estadio Nacional de Hockey, Quilmes
Umpires:
Mary Power (IRE)
Cecilia Valenzuela (CHI)

21 May 2001
13:00

Australia	4–1	England
Skirving 6'; Patrick 9', 37', 41'	Report	Robertson 59'

Estadio Nacional de Hockey, Quilmes

22 May 2001
13:00

Australia	1–0	Argentina
Taylor 58'	Report

Estadio Nacional de Hockey, Quilmes
Umpires:
Cecilia Valenzuela (CHI)
Gina Spitaleri (AUS)

22 May 2001
15:00

England	3–2	New Zealand
Robertson 13', 51'; Danson 26'	Report	Hamahona 6'; Douglas 21'

Estadio Nacional de Hockey, Quilmes
Umpires:
Soledad Iparraguirre (ARG)
Kazuko Yasueda (JPN)

=== Non-Medal Round ===
==== Pool G ====
Pos	Team	Pld	W	D	L	GF	GA	GD	Pts	Qualification
1	India	2	2	0	0	10	0	+10	6	9th to 12th
2	Wales	2	1	0	1	3	6	−3	3	9th to 12th
3	Canada	2	0	0	2	2	9	−7	0	

Rules for classification: 1) points; 2) goal difference; 3) goals scored; 4) head-to-head result.

19 May 2001
15:30

Wales	3–2	Canada
Thomas 44', 53', 61'	Report	Quinn 4'; Leslie 12'

CeNARD, Buenos Aires
Umpires:
Margaret Hunnaball (ENG)
Judith Brinsfield (USA)

21 May 2001
09:00

Canada	0–6	India
	Report	Mamta 8', 27'; Sanggai 15'; Kerketta 38', 68'; Pakpi 45'

Estadio Nacional de Hockey, Quilmes

22 May 2001
09:00

India	4–0	Wales
Sanggai 6', 68'; Pakpi 8'; Kerketta 68'	Report

Estadio Nacional de Hockey, Quilmes
Umpires:
Alicia Takeda (MEX)
Marelize de Klerk (RSA)

==== Pool H ====
Pos	Team	Pld	W	D	L	GF	GA	GD	Pts	Qualification
1	Spain	3	2	0	1	14	5	+9	6	9th to 12th
2	Chile	3	2	0	1	2	5	−3	6	9th to 12th
3	United States	3	1	0	2	5	6	−1	3	
4	Russia	3	1	0	2	5	10	−5	3	

Rules for classification: 1) points; 2) goal difference; 3) goals scored; 4) head-to-head result.

19 May 2001
09:00

Chile	1–0	United States
Da. Infante 67'	Report

Estadio Nacional de Hockey, Quilmes
Umpires:
Heike Malina (GER)
Tetyana Kaltypan (UKR)

19 May 2001
15:00

Spain	7–2	Russia
Romagosa 14'; Malda 30', 65'; Giménez-Casas 33'; Sánchez 48', 59'; Martínez 52'	Report	Tchoukareva 49'; Timachkova 61'

Estadio Nacional de Hockey, Quilmes
Umpires:
Peri Buckley (AUS)
Alicia Takeda (MEX)

21 May 2001
11:00

Russia	3–2	United States
Chentsova 19', 69'; Silvina 53'	Report	Rizzo 10'; Fronzoni 54'

Estadio Nacional de Hockey, Quilmes
Umpires:
Annette Wilson (ENG)
Tetyana Kaltypan (UKR)

21 May 2001
13:00

Spain	5–0	Chile
Romagosa 8'; Malda 19'; Sánchez 41'; Muñoz 65'; Martínez 68'	Report

CeNARD, Buenos Aires
Umpires:
Sarah Garnett (NZL)
Alicia Takeda (MEX)

22 May 2001
13:30

United States	3–2	Spain
Woolley 13', 70'; Fronzoni 50'	Report	Muñoz 52'; Malda 66'

CeNARD, Buenos Aires
Umpires:
Peri Buckley (AUS)
Heike Malina (GER)

22 May 2001
15:30

Chile	1–0	Russia
Rodríguez 1'	Report

CeNARD, Buenos Aires
Umpires:
Judith Brinsfield (USA)
Mary Power (IRE)

=== Thirteenth to fifteenth place classification ===
Crossover
24 May 2001
Canada	5
Russia	0

Thirteenth and Fourteenth Place
25 May 2001
United States	0
Canada	1

==== Crossover ====
24 May 2001
11:00

Canada	5–0	Russia
Shaw 2'; Reaburn 19'; Jameson 23', 70'; Quinn 61'	Report

CeNARD, Buenos Aires
Umpires:
Cecilia Valenzuela (CHI)
Lourdes Santiago (CHI)

==== Thirteenth and fourteenth place ====
25 May 2001
16:00

United States	0–1	Canada
	Report	Jameson 62'

CeNARD, Buenos Aires
Umpires:
Alicia Takeda (MEX)
Tetyana Kaltypan (UKR)

=== Ninth to twelfth place classification ===
Crossover
24 May 2001
India	4
Chile	0
24 May 2001
Spain	2
Wales	0

Ninth Place
26 May 2001
India	5
Spain	1
Eleventh Place
25 May 2001
Chile	1
Wales	2

==== Crossover ====
24 May 2001
11:00

India	4–0	Chile
Sanggai 5'; Kerketta 22'; Mamta 45', 59'	Report

Estadio Nacional de Hockey, Quilmes
Umpires:
Ann van Dyk (CAN)
Annette Wilson (ENG)

24 May 2001
13:30

Spain	2–0	Wales
Malda 41'; Romagosa 45'	Report

Estadio Nacional de Hockey, Quilmes
Umpires:
Carolina de la Fuente (ARG)
Tetyana Kaltypan (UKR)

==== Eleventh and twelfth place ====
25 May 2001
14:00

Chile	1–2 (a.e.t.)	Wales
Da. Infante 3'	Report	Marsden 30'; Sharples 78'

Estadio Nacional de Hockey, Quilmes

==== Ninth and tenth place ====
26 May 2001
09:00

India	5–1	Spain
Sanggai 6', 51'; Pakpi 8'; Saba 30', 34'	Report	Termens 65'

CeNARD, Buenos Aires
Umpires:
Mary Power (IRE)
Ann van Dyk (CAN)

=== Fifth to eighth place classification ===
Crossover
25 May 2001
Germany	0
New Zealand	1
25 May 2001
England	0
South Africa	1

Fifth place
26 May 2001
New Zealand	6
South Africa	1
Seventh Place
26 May 2001
Germany	5
England	1

==== Crossover ====
25 May 2001
09:00

Germany	0–1	New Zealand
	Report	Hamahona 30'

Estadio Nacional de Hockey, Quilmes
Umpires:
Peri Buckley (AUS)
Margaret Hunnabal (ENG)

25 May 2001
11:30

England	0–1	South Africa
	Report	Mayer 34'

Estadio Nacional de Hockey, Quilmes
Umpires:
Mary Power (IRE)
Sarah Garnett (NZL)

==== Seventh and eighth place ====
26 May 2001
09:30

Germany	5–1	England
Eilhardt 5', 40'; Patschkowski 30'; Rinne 44'; Böhmert 45'	Report	Smith 60'

Estadio Nacional de Hockey, Quilmes
Umpires:
Cecilia Valenzuela (CHI)
Marelize de Klerk (RSA)

==== Fifth and sixth place ====
26 May 2001
12:00

New Zealand	6–1	South Africa
Douglas 14'; Redfern 22', 66', 70'; Igasan 35'; Hamahona 48'	Report	Marescia 61'

Estadio Nacional de Hockey, Quilmes
Umpires:
Annette Wilson (ENG)
Soledad Iparraguirre (ARG)

=== First to fourth place classification ===
Semi-finals
24 May 2001
Australia	0
South Korea (a.e.t)	1
24 May 2001
Netherlands	0
Argentina	2

Gold-medal match
26 May 2001
South Korea (p.s.o)	2 (4)
Argentina	2 (3)
Bronze-medal match
26 May 2001
Australia	2
Netherlands	0

==== Semi-finals ====
24 May 2001
16:00

Netherlands	0–2	Argentina
	Report	Del Carril 7'; Doreski 51'

Estadio Nacional de Hockey, Quilmes
Umpires:
Julie Ashton-Lucy (AUS)
Marelize de Klerk (RSA)

24 May 2001
18:30

Australia	0–1 (a.e.t.)	South Korea
	Report	Kim Y. 82'

Estadio Nacional de Hockey, Quilmes

==== Third and fourth place ====
26 May 2001
14:30

Australia	2–0	Netherlands
Smithson 15', 49'	Report

Estadio Nacional de Hockey, Quilmes
Umpires:
Carolina de la Fuente (ARG)
Gina Spitaleri (ITA)

==== Final ====
26 May 2001
17:00

South Korea	2–2	Argentina
Kim M. 51'; Kim Y. 57'	Report	Del Carril 6', 11'
Penalties
	4–3

Estadio Nacional de Hockey, Quilmes
Umpires:
Julie Ashton-Lucy (AUS)
Kazuko Yasueda (JPN)

== Awards ==
Player of the Tournament	Top Goalscorer	Goalkeeper of the Tournament
(Argentina) Mariné Russo	(South Korea) Kim Yun-Mi	(Argentina) Angela Cattaneo

== Statistics ==
=== Final standings ===
As per statistical convention in field hockey, matches decided in extra time are counted as wins and losses, while matches decided by penalty shoot-outs are counted as draws.

Pos	Grp	Team	Pld	W	D	L	GF	GA	GD	Pts	Final result
1	D	South Korea	8	6	1	1	28	5	+23	19	Gold medal
2	C	Argentina (H)	8	6	1	1	22	3	+19	19	Silver medal
3	B	Australia	7	6	0	1	12	4	+8	18	Bronze medal
4	A	Netherlands	8	5	0	3	15	7	+8	15	Fourth place
5	A	New Zealand	8	3	1	4	14	11	+3	10	Eliminated in medal round
6	C	South Africa	8	3	1	4	7	19	−12	10	Eliminated in medal round
7	B	Germany	7	3	1	3	15	6	+9	10	Eliminated in medal round
8	D	England	8	3	0	5	10	16	−6	9	Eliminated in medal round
9	A	India	7	5	1	1	21	2	+19	16	Eliminated in group stage
10	C	Spain	8	4	0	4	20	18	+2	12	Eliminated in group stage
11	C	Wales	7	2	0	5	5	16	−11	6	Eliminated in group stage
12	B	Chile	7	2	0	5	4	20	−16	6	Eliminated in group stage
13	D	Canada	7	3	0	4	10	21	−11	9	Eliminated in group stage
14	A	United States	7	1	0	6	6	18	−12	3	Eliminated in group stage
15	D	Russia	7	1	0	6	6	29	−23	3	Eliminated in group stage

Source: FIH
(H) Hosts

=== Goalscorers ===
There were 195 goals scored in 56 matches, for an average of 3.48 goals per match.

12 goals

- (South Korea) Kim Yun-Mi

7 goals

- (India) Adeline Kerketta

6 goals

- (Argentina) Cecilia del Carrill

5 goals

- (England) Imogen Robertson
- (India) Sanggai Chanu
- (Netherlands) Nienke van Ruiten
- (Spain) Bárbara Malda

4 goals

- (Argentina) Martina Arcostanzo
- (Argentina) Claudia Burkart
- (Australia) Donna-Lee Patrick
- (Germany) Ulrike Patschkowski
- (Germany) Fanny Rinne
- (India) Mamta Kharab
- (Netherlands) Aukje de Groot
- (South Korea) Park Jeong-Suk
- (Spain) María Romagosa
- (Spain) Pilar Sánchez

3 goals

- (Argentina) Mariné Russo
- (Australia) Sian Smithson
- (Canada) Stephanie Jameson
- (Germany) Anneke Böhmert
- (India) Pakpi Devi
- (Netherlands) Kim Lammers
- (New Zealand) Piki Hamahona
- (New Zealand) Kristy Redfern
- (South Africa) Sophie Mayer
- (South Korea) Kim Mi-Ok
- (Wales) Sarah Thomas

2 goals

- (Argentina) Vanina Raimondo
- (Canada) Stephanie Quinn
- (Canada) Ashley Reaburn
- (Chile) Daniela Infante
- (Germany) Cora Eilhardt
- (Germany) Sibylle Hinsken
- (India) Saba Anjum
- (New Zealand) Amanda Christie
- (New Zealand) Laura Douglas
- (New Zealand) Elizabeth Igasan
- (Russia) Olga Chentsova
- (Russia) Lidia Tchoukareva
- (South Africa) Marsha Marescia
- (South Korea) Oh Ko-Woon
- (South Korea) Ko Kwang-Min
- (South Korea) Han Yu-Kyung
- (Spain) Marta Giménez-Casas
- (Spain) Gemma Martínez
- (Spain) Ivet Muñoz
- (United States) April Fronzoni
- (United States) Abbey Woolley

1 goal

- (Argentina) María Armani
- (Argentina) Florencia D'Elía
- (Argentina) Natalí Doreski
- (Australia) Renee Allen
- (Australia) Nicole Arrold
- (Australia) Shayni Buswell
- (Australia) Angela Skirving
- (Australia) Sarah Taylor
- (Canada) Robin Leslie
- (Canada) Lauren MacLean
- (Canada) Lucy Shaw
- (Chile) Carolina García
- (Chile) Fernanda Rodríguez
- (England) Annalisa Bishop
- (England) Alexandra Danson
- (England) Helen Richardson
- (England) Rebecca-Lee Smith
- (England) Kate Walsh
- (Netherlands) Maartje Scheepstra
- (Netherlands) Emmelin Spek
- (Netherlands) Eveline Wisse Smit
- (New Zealand) Stacey Carr
- (New Zealand) Kate Saunders
- (Russia) Joulia Silvina
- (Russia) Nadejda Timachkova
- (South Africa) Leanne McNally
- (South Africa) Sharne Wehmeyer
- (South Korea) Kim Ae-Hyun
- (South Korea) Kang Na-Young
- (South Korea) Lee Seon-Ok
- (Spain) Esther Termens
- (United States) Jessica Coleman
- (United States) Dina Rizzo
- (Wales) Caroline Marsden
- (Wales) Delyth Sharples
