= Northern Territory Hockey Association =

- Sport: Field hockey
- Abbreviation: NTHA
- Founded: 1948; 78 years ago
- Affiliation: Hockey Australia
- Headquarters: Marrara Hockey Centre
- Location: Marrara, Darwin
- President: Andrew Green

Official website
- www.hockeynt.asn.au
- (Northern Territory)

Hockey Northern Territory, formally the Northern Territory Hockey Association, is the governing body for Field hockey in the Northern Territory of Australia. NT Stingers and NT Pearls representing Northern Territory in the Australian Hockey League and Malaysia Hockey League.

Both the men's and women's Northern Territory representative teams entered the AHL at different times. While the women joined in the tournament's inaugural year of 1993, the men didn't join until 1998.

While participating for the first three years, the women's team were absent from the AHL between 1996 and 1999.

The men and women have both previously represented NT under different names. The men have represented as the Territory Stingers (2001–2008) and the Darwin Stingers (2010, 2012), while the women have represented as the Darwin Blazez (1993–1995) and the Territory Pearls (2006–2007, 2010).

== See also ==
- Sport in the Northern Territory
