= Lisa Eglington =

Australian field hockey player

Personal information
- Born: 23 February 1984 (age 42) Maryborough, Queensland

Sport
- Sport: Field hockey
- Position: Forward
Senior career
Years	Team	Caps	Goals
2003–2006	QLD Scorchers	48	11
2007–2012	WA Diamonds	55	14
National team
Years	Team	Caps	Goals
2004–2005	Australia U–21	21	(7)
2011	Australia	7	(1)
Medal record
Women's field hockey
Representing Australia
Junior Oceania Cup
Gold medal – first place	2004 Wellington	Team

Lisa Eglington (née Pamenter, born 23 February 1984) is a former field hockey player from Australia, who played as a forward.

== Personal life ==
Lisa Eglington was born and raised in Maryborough, Queensland.

She is married to fellow former Australian representative, Nathan Eglington. The pair live in Tweed Heads with their two children.

== Career ==
=== Domestic hockey ===
In Hockey Australia's former premier domestic competition, the Australian Hockey League (AHL), Eglington represented both Queensland and Western Australia during her career. In 2003, she debuted for the QLD Scorchers and represented the team until 2006, also winning a national title in 2005 edition.

Following a move to Western Australia, Eglington made the switch to the WA Diamonds in 2007. During her five seasons with the Diamonds, Eglington won three national titles; in 2007, 2008 and 2010.

=== International hockey ===
==== Under–21 ====
Eglington was a member of the Australia U–21 team for two years. She made her debut for the team in 2004 during a test series against China in Adelaide. Later that year she represented the team at the Junior Oceania Cup in Wellington, where she won a gold medal.

In 2005 she was a member of the team that finished fourth at the FIH Junior World Cup in Santiago.

==== Hockeyroos ====
Eglington made her debut for the Hockeyroos in 2011, during a test series against India in Perth. Her debut came after many appearances in national development tours and development squads. She made her last appearance for the national team in a test match against China in November 2011.

=== International goals ===
Goal	Date	Location	Opponent	Score	Result	Competition	Ref.
1	3 November 2011	Perth Hockey Stadium, Perth, Australia	China	4–2	6–4	Test Match	
