= Donna-Lee Patrick =

Australian field hockey player

Personal information
- Born: 5 April 1982 (age 44) Alice Springs, Northern Territory

Sport
- Sport: Field hockey
- Position: Forward
Senior career
Years	Team	Caps	Goals
2000	Territory Pearls	11	3
2001–2006	Adelaide Suns	55	13
National team
Years	Team	Caps	Goals
2001–2006	Australia	80	(12)
2001	Australia U–21	9	(5)
Medal record
Women's field hockey
Representing Australia
FIH World Cup
Silver medal – second place	2006 Madrid	Team
Oceania Cup
Gold medal – first place	2001 New Zealand	Team
Gold medal – first place	2003 Australia/New Zealand	Team
Gold medal – first place	2005 New Zealand/Australia	Team
FIH Junior World Cup
Bronze medal – third place	2001 Buenos Aires	Team

Donna-Lee Patrick (born 5 April 1982) is a former field hockey player from Australia, who played as a forward.

== Personal life ==
Donna-Lee Patrick was born and raised in Alice Springs, Northern Territory.

== Career ==
=== AHL ===
Patrick made her debut in the Australian Hockey League (AHL) in 2000 as a member of the Territory Pearls. Following a move to Adelaide, Patrick transferred to the Adelaide Suns, where she represented South Australia for six seasons.

=== International hockey ===
==== Under–21 ====
In 2001, Patrick was a member of the Australia U–21 side, the Jillaroos. She represented the team at the FIH Junior World Cup in Buenos Aires, where she won a bronze medal.

==== Hockeyroos ====
Patrick also made her senior international debut in 2001, representing Australia's national team, the Hockeyroos, at the Korean Telecom Cup in Seoul.

Throughout her career, Patrick represented the Hockeyroos on 80 occasions, most notably at the 2006 FIH World Cup in Madrid, where she won a silver medal. She also won gold at three consecutive Oceania Cup's, from 2001 through 2005.

=== International goals ===
Goal	Date	Location	Opponent	Score	Result	Competition	Ref.
1	4 July 2001	Seongnam Stadium, Seoul, South Korea	England	3–1	8–4	2001 Telecom Cup	
2	28 October 2001	State Netball and Hockey Centre, Melbourne, Australia	New Zealand	1–1	4–3	Test Match	
3	29 April 2002	Gifu Memorial Center, Gifu, Japan	Russia	5–2	5–2	Test Match	
4	11 August 2005	State Hockey Centre, Adelaide, Australia	South Korea	2–0	3–2	Test Match	
5	18 August 2005	Queensland State Hockey Centre, Brisbane, Australia	South Korea	1–0	2–1	Test Match	
6	8 October 2005	Major Dhyan Chand National Stadium, New Delhi, India	India	2–2	2–2	Indira Gandhi Gold Cup	
7	29 June 2006	Reading Hockey Club, Reading, United Kingdom	England	1–1	1–2	Test Match	
8	2 July 2006	Reading Hockey Club, Reading, United Kingdom	England	3–0	3–1	Test Match	
9	16 July 2006	Wagener Stadium, Amsterdam, Netherlands	New Zealand	1–0	2–1	2006 FIH Champions Trophy	
10	16 July 2006	Wagener Stadium, Amsterdam, Netherlands	New Zealand	2–0	2–1	2006 FIH Champions Trophy	
11	20 August 2006	University of Maryland, College Park, United States	Netherlands	1–2	1–2	Test Match	
12	27 August 2006	Virginia Beach Sportsplex, Virginia Beach, United States	United States	2–0	4–2	Test Match	
