= Sheree Horvath =

New Zealand field hockey player

Sheree Horvath (born 7 April 1980) is a New Zealand field hockey player who competed in the 2008 Summer Olympics.
