= Barbara Vogel =

German historian (born 1940)

Barbara Vogel (born 7 December 1940) is a German historian.

== Life ==
Born in Hamburg, Vogel studied history, German language and literature, philosophy and education. She received her doctorate in 1971 from the Historisches Seminar in Hamburg with a thesis on German policy towards Russia from 1900 to 1906, and her habilitation in 1981 in Hamburg with a thesis on the reform policies of the Prussian State Chancellor Karl August von Hardenberg (1810–1820). From 1984 until her retirement in 2006, Vogel taught as Professor of Modern History at the University of Hamburg.

Since the 1980s, the advancement of women at the university has been a central concern of Vogel. From 1985 to 1989, she worked in the Academic Senate and was also elected a member of the Gleichstellungsbeauftragte during the same period. From 1990 to 1994, she was Vice-President of the University of Hamburg. From 2000 to 2002, she was dean of the Department of History. In 2002, she received the Women's Promotion Prize of the University of Hamburg. Her research focuses on modern history with a focus on German social history of the 19th and 20th centuries. Vogel has researched and written articles on the foreign and domestic policies of Wilhelmine Germany, Prussian reform policies in the 19th century, the history of civil service in Germany, the history of German parties in the 19th and 20th centuries, Hamburg university history and women's history.

Vogel war stellvertretende Vorsitzende der Historische Kommission beim SPD-Parteivorstand.

== Publications ==
Monographs

- Allgemeine Gewerbefreiheit. Die Reformpolitik des preußischen Staatskanzlers Hardenberg (1810–1820) (Kritische Studien zur Geschichtswissenschaft. Vol. 57). Vandenhoeck & Ruprecht, Göttingen 1983, ISBN 3-525-35716-8 (at the same time: Hamburg, Universität, Habilitation, 1981).
- Deutsche Russlandpolitik. Das Scheitern der deutschen Weltpolitik unter Bülow 1900–1906 (Studien zur modernen Geschichte. Vol. 11) Düsseldorf 1973, ISBN 3-571-09051-9.
- with Peter Borowsky, Heide Wunder: Einführung in die Geschichtswissenschaft (Studienbücher Moderne Geschichte. Vol. 1). 5th, revised and updated edition. Westdeutscher Verlag, Opladen 1975, ISBN 3-531-21310-5.

As publisher

- Frauen in der Ständegesellschaft. Leben und Arbeiten in der Stadt vom späten Mittelalter bis zur Neuzeit (Beiträge zur deutschen und europäischen Geschichte. Vol. 4). Krämer, Hamburg 1991, ISBN 3-926952-25-3.
