= Manju Phalswal =

Indian field hockey player

Personal information
- Born: 25 May 1982 (age 44) Delhi, India
Medal record
Women's field hockey
Representing India
Asia Cup
Gold medal – first place	2004 New Delhi

Manju Phalswal (born 25 May 1982) is an Indian national field hockey player and the current Captain of the Domestic Delhi team. She plays as a midfielder.

== International circuit ==
- Asia Cup February 2004 – Delhi (1st)
- Junior World Cup May 2001 – Buenos Aires (9th)
- Asian Tour August 2005 – Singapore – 4-Nation Tournament (1st)
- May 2004 – Gifu (Japan) – 4-nation Takamadonomiya Tournament (LAST)
- 4 National Tournament- New Jersey
- India Malaysia test match – India
- 4 Nationes Tournament- South Africa
- 4 National Tournament- Russia
- Shimbashira Cup- Japan
- (under 18) Asia Cup-Hong Kong
