= Piki Hamahona =

New Zealand field hockey player

Personal information
- Full name: Piki Te Ora Hamahona
- Born: 29 May 1982 (age 44) Whanganui, New Zealand

Sport
- Sport: Field hockey
- Position: Forward
Senior career
Years	Team	Caps	Goals
2004	Tassie Van Demons	9	3
2005–2008	NSW Arrows	35	16
2009	Southern Suns	13	6
National team
Years	Team	Caps	Goals
2000–2001	New Zealand U–21	11	(4)
2001–2010	New Zealand	45	(6)
Medal record
Women's field hockey
Representing Australia
Oceania Cup
Silver medal – second place	2001 New Zealand	Team
Silver medal – second place	2003 Australia/New Zealand	Team

Piki Te Ora Hamahona (born 29 May 1982) is a former field hockey player from New Zealand, who played as a forward.

== Personal life ==
While being born and raised in Whanganui, Hamahona resides in Wollongong, on the East Coast of Australia.

Piki Hamahona is the younger sister of former New Zealand international, Marama Hamahona.

== Career ==
=== Domestic hockey ===
Hamahona has appeared in both Australia and New Zealand's national hockey leagues, the AHL and Ford NHL.

=== International hockey ===
==== Under–21 ====
In 2000, Hamahona was a member of the New Zealand U–21 at the Junior Oceania Cup in Canberra. At the tournament, Hamahona won a silver medal.

The following year Hamahona represented the team again, at the 2001 FIH Junior World Cup in Buenos Aires, where the team finished 5th.

==== Black Sticks ====
Hamahona made her debut for the Black Sticks in 2001.

Her first major tournament with the national team was in 2002, at the FIH Champions Trophy in Macau. She represented the team later that year at the FIH World Cup in Perth.

Following a six-year hiatus from the national squad, Hamahona was recalled to the squad in 2009.
