= Pakpi Devi Ngasepam =

Indian field hockey player

Medal record

Women's field hockey

Representing India

Commonwealth Games
Gold medal – first place	2002 Manchester	Team

Asia Cup
Silver medal – second place	1999 New Delhi	

Champions Challenge
Bronze medal – third place	2002 Johannesburg	Team

Pakpi Devi Ngasepam (Meitei: Ngasepam Pakpi Devi, born 10 March 1981) is an Indian field hockey player who played for the India women's national field hockey team. She played with the team when it won the Gold at the Manchester 2002 Commonwealth Games.

She played for Western Railways in the domestic tournaments.

== Personal life ==
Devi hails from Manipur.
