= Renae Holmes =

Australian field hockey player

Renae Leah Holmes, (née van Schagen; born 28 November 1977, in Brisbane) is a field hockey player from Australia. She played for the Hockeyroos, Australia's national women's team, as a defender, winning a silver medal at a 6 Nations International Tournament in Gifu, Japan. Coach Mark Hagar named Holmes one of Australia's leading players during her international debut.

At a national level, she represented the Queensland Scorchers in the AHL (Australian Hockey League) between 1997 and 2007, winning the national title in 1997 and 2005, where she was the competition's leading goal scorer. A decade later, she returned to representative hockey, leading Queensland to win the 35s Masters National Championship in 2015 and co-captaining the Australian 35 Masters team in 2016. In 2019 she led Queensland to the 40s national championship and was selected to captain Australia at the 2020 World Cup. Holmes plays for St Andrews Ladies Hockey Club in the Brisbane Women's Hockey Association (BWHA). In March 2020, Holmes became the seventh player to play 300 division one BWHA games.

Holmes is a member of the Toowoomba Hockey Association (THA) Hall of Fame and, in March 2021, was named in the THA’s greatest ever team. In 2023, Holmes was named one of the "Saints of the Century", in celebration of her club’s 100-year anniversary.
