= Estadio Nacional de Hockey =

Coordinates: 34°44′35″S 58°15′8″W

National Hockey Stadium
- Estadio Nacional de Hockey
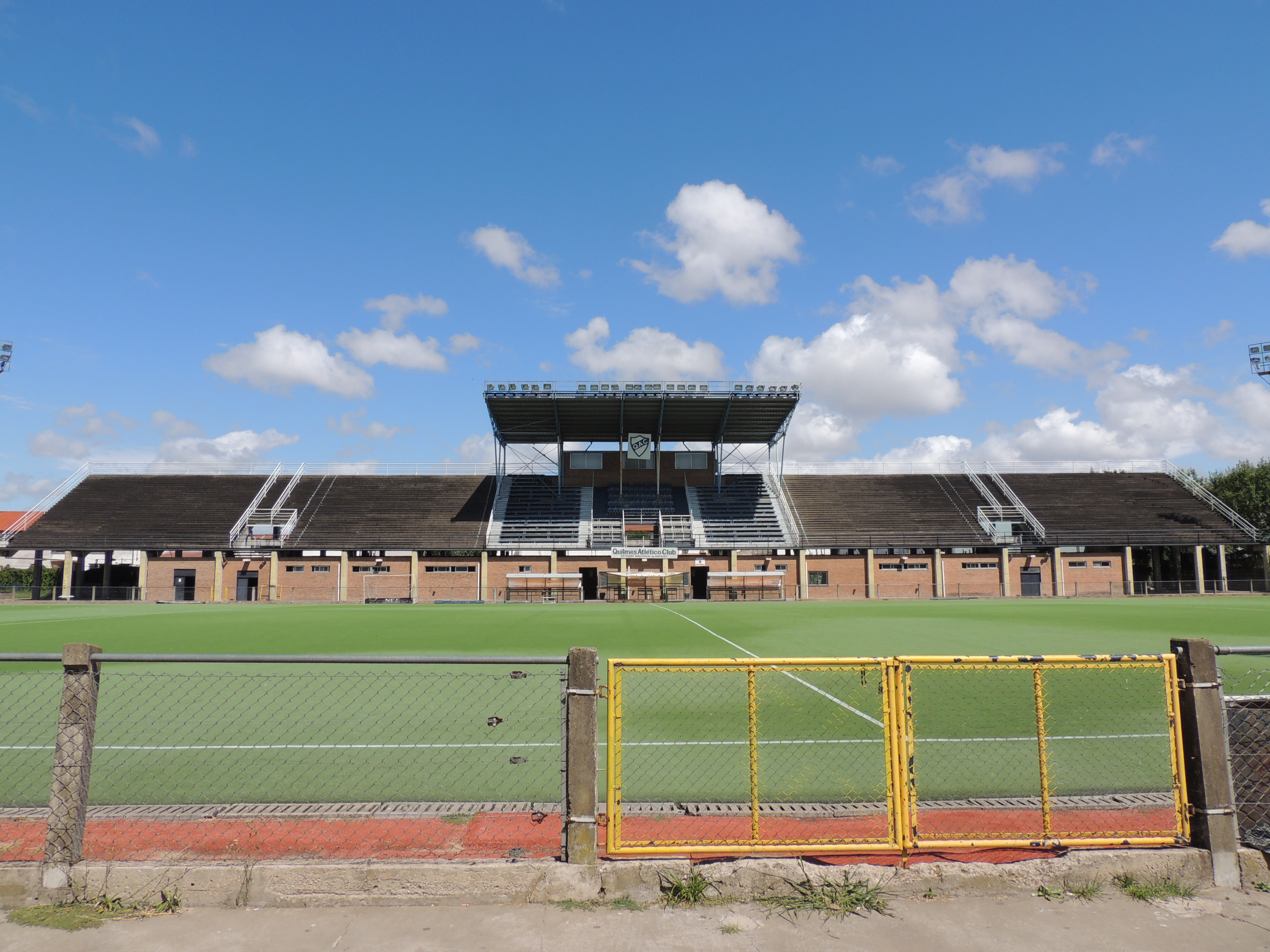
- The stadium in 2019
- Interactive map of National Hockey Stadium
- Full name: Estadio Nacional de Hockey
- Address: Olegario Andrade s/n Quilmes; Argentina
- Owner: Argentine Hockey Confederation
- Capacity: 6,000
- Surface: Artificial turf

Construction
- Opened: 1999; 27 years ago

Tenants
- Quilmes A.C.; Argentina national women's team; Argentina national men's team

National Hockey Stadium (Spanish: Estadio Nacional de Hockey) is a field hockey stadium located in the Quilmes neighborhood of the homonymous partido in Argentina. The venue was inaugurated in 1999 and has been operated by the Quilmes Atlético Club since 2011.

== Overview ==
In 2011, the Argentine Hockey Confederation granted concession to Quilmes A.C. for a period of 20 years. The agreement allowed Quilmes's hockey teams to use the stadium as their home venue, while the CAH kept the right to use the stadium for international events involving the men's and women's national teams.

The Estadio Nacional has a concrete-made grandstand with capacity for 6,000 spectators, and an artificial turf pitch. Other facilities include four locker rooms, press rooms and boxes, and first aid room.

It is located next to Estadio Centenario Ciudad de Quilmes, on Olegario Andrade street.

The stadium hosted the 2007 Women's Hockey Champions Trophy and the 2012 Men's Hockey Champions Challenge I.
