= Sian Smithson =

Australian field hockey player

Personal information
- Born: 9 October 1982 (age 43) Western Australia

Sport
- Sport: Field hockey
- Position: Forward
Senior career
Years	Team	Caps	Goals
2004–2011	WA Diamonds	92	39
National team
Years	Team	Caps	Goals
2001	Australia U–21	10	(5)
2005	Australia	3	(1)
Medal record
Women's field hockey
Representing Australia
FIH Junior World Cup
Bronze medal – third place	2001 Buenos Aires	Team

Sian Smithson (born 9 October 1982) is a former field hockey player from Australia, who played as a forward.

== Career ==
=== AHL ===
Smithson made her debut in the Australian Hockey League (AHL) in 2004 as a member of the WAIS Diamonds. In her debut year for the team, Smithson won a national title, scoring four goals in the Diamonds' campaign. Smithson continued to compete with the group until 2011, earning 5 national championships in the process.

=== International hockey ===
==== Under–21 ====
In 2001, Smithson was a member of the Australia U–21 side, the Jillaroos. She represented the team at the FIH Junior World Cup in Buenos Aires, where she won a bronze medal.

==== Hockeyroos ====
Smithson made her senior international debut for the Hockeyroos in 2005, during a test series against Korea in Adelaide.

=== International goals ===
Goal	Date	Location	Opponent	Score	Result	Competition	Ref.
1	12 August 2005	Pines Hockey Stadium, Adelaide, Australia	South Korea	1–1	2–1	Test Match	
