= Shelly Liddelow =

Australian field hockey player

Shelly "Sparky" Liddelow (born 30 June 1984 in Manjimup, Western Australia) plays field hockey for the Australian Women's Hockey Team, the Hockeyroos. She made her debut for Australia in 2007. Her Australian National Hockey League (NHL) team is WA Diamonds. Her local club is UWA Hockey Club.

Originally only a reserve player for the Hockeyroos, Shelly entered the spotlight after Fiona Johnson injured her hamstring. She scored two goals in her first Olympic match, helping Australia to win against South Korea.

Shelly has recently completed her Master of Pharmacy at Curtin University.

== Playing credentials ==
=== International caps ===
- 15 – at start of Beijing Olympic Games

=== Career highlights ===
- 2010 – Delhi Commonwealth Games,(1st)
- 2008 – Summer Olympics, Beijing China
- 2007 – Hockeyroos debut, Champions Trophy, Quilmes Argentina (4th)
- 2005 – Junior World Cup, Chile (4th)

=== Recent performances ===
- 2008 – Test Series (v England), Australia (1st)
- 2007 – Good Luck Beijing Test Event, Beijing China (1st)
- 2007 – World Cup, Quilmes Argentina (4th)

== Major injuries ==
- 2006 – Stress fracture, hip
- 2004 – Stress fracture, femur
- 2003 – Compartments syndrome (surgery)
