= Renee Trost =

Australian field hockey player

Personal information
- Born: 12 October 1980 (age 45) Albury, New South Wales

Sport
- Sport: Field hockey
- Position: Midfielder
Senior career
Years	Team	Caps	Goals
2000–2011	VIC Vipers	133	29
National team
Years	Team	Caps	Goals
2007–2011	Australia	47	(3)
Medal record
Women's field hockey
Representing Australia

Renee Trost (born 12 October 1980) is a former field hockey player from Australia, who played as a midfielder.

== Personal life ==
Renee Trost was born and raised in Albury, NSW, however now resides in Melbourne, VIC.

She is currently working as a Naturopath in Melbourne.

== Career ==
=== Domestic hockey ===
==== Club hockey ====
During her career, Trost's home club in Hockey Victoria's Premier League competition was Waverley. She also previously played for Camberwell.

==== AHL ====
Trost made her debut into Hockey Australia's premier domestic competition, the Australian Hockey League (AHL) in 2000, as a member of the VIC Vipers. Her AHL career spanned twelve seasons, culminating at the 2011 Tournament. She only won a national title on one occasion, in 2003.

=== International hockey ===
Renee Trost made her senior international debut for Australia in 2007, at the FIH Champions Trophy in Quilmes.

Trost made a small number of appearances in 2008, however was precluded from the squad shortly after.

Following three years out of the national squad, Trost returned to the team in 2011 with ambitions of playing at the 2012 Olympic Games in London.

==== International goals ====
Goal	Date	Location	Opponent	Score	Result	Competition	Ref.
1	13 January 2007	Estadio Nacional de Hockey, Quilmes, Argentina	Japan	1–0	3–0	2007 FIH Champions Trophy	
2	19 May 2007	Otago Hockey Association, Dunedin, New Zealand	New Zealand	1–0	1–0	Test Match	
3	16 June 2011	Berliner HC, Berlin, Germany	Argentina	1–0	3–3	Test Match	
