= Julie Ashton-Lucy =

Australian field hockey umpire

Julie Ashton-Lucy (born 29 November 1965) is an international field hockey umpire from Queensland, Australia. She was honored as Hockey Australia 2005 Official of the Year.

She has umpired at 2002 and 2006 Commonwealth Games, the 2002, 2006 and 2010 Hockey World Cup, as well as the 2004, 2008 and 2012 Summer Olympics, where she umpired the final of the 2012 tournament.

On 13 September 2000, Ashton-Lucy was awarded the Australian Sports Medal.
