= Kim Walker (field hockey) =

Australian field hockey player

Personal information
- Nationality: Australian
- Born: 14 December 1975 (age 50)

Sport
- Sport: Field hockey
Medal record
Women's field hockey
Representing Australia
Commonwealth Games
Gold medal – first place	2006 Melbourne	Team

Kim Walker (born 14 December 1975) is an Australian field hockey player who competed in the 2008 Summer Olympics.
