= Territory Pearls =

Australian field hockey club

Northern Territory Pearls
- City: Darwin
- League: Australian Hockey League
- Founded: 1993; 33 years ago
- Home arena: Marrara Hockey Stadium
- Colours: Orange, Black
- Owner: Northern Territory Hockey Association
- Head coach: Mark Davis

The NT Pearls aka Darwin Airport Resort Territory Pearls are a nationally competing women's field hockey team based in the Northern Territory of Australia.

== History ==
Both the men's and women's Northern Territory representative teams entered the Australian Hockey League at different times. While the women joined in the tournament's inaugural year of 1993, the men didn't join until 1998.

While participating for the first three years, the women's team were absent from the AHL between 1996 and 1999.

The men and women have both previously represented NT under different names. The men have represented as the Territory Stingers (2001–2008) and the Darwin Stingers (2010, 2012), while the women have represented as the Darwin Blazez (1993–1995) and the Territory Pearls (2006–2007, 2010).

The Territory Pearls will part in the Malaysian domestic season Malaysia Hockey League in 2025.

=== Squads ===
2015 NT Pearls hockey team
Players	Coaches
Elizabeth Duguid (Goalkeeper); Rachel Divall; Brooke Peris (Captain); Clair Fernandez (Goalkeeper); Hannah Raftery; Stephanie O'Connor; Candyce Peacock; Riley Smith; Kate Paul; Claire McGarity; Tegan Richards; Mikaela Patterson; Yasmin Osborne; Molly Simpson; Amy Swann; Emma Scriven; Tegan Risk; Aimee Clark	Head coach: Mark Davis; Manager: Leah Atkinson

NT Pearls hockey team
Players	Coaches
Sarah Paul; Aleesha Thompson; Brooke Peris; Samantha Morris; Angela Marriner; Jodie Haylock; Emily Smith; Sarah Martyn; Samantha Spry; Heather Langham; Caitlin Bender; Candice Liddy; Jodie Brown; Thisja Van De Kruijs; Elle Richardson; Elizabeth Duguid; Samantha Panguee; Ashlee Pointer; Alisa Clarke; Ashleigh Morrison; Tammy Eiser; Charlotte Salt; Sam Eiser; Tori Lockley	Head coach: Daniel Hayes
