= Melody Cooper =

New Zealand field hockey player

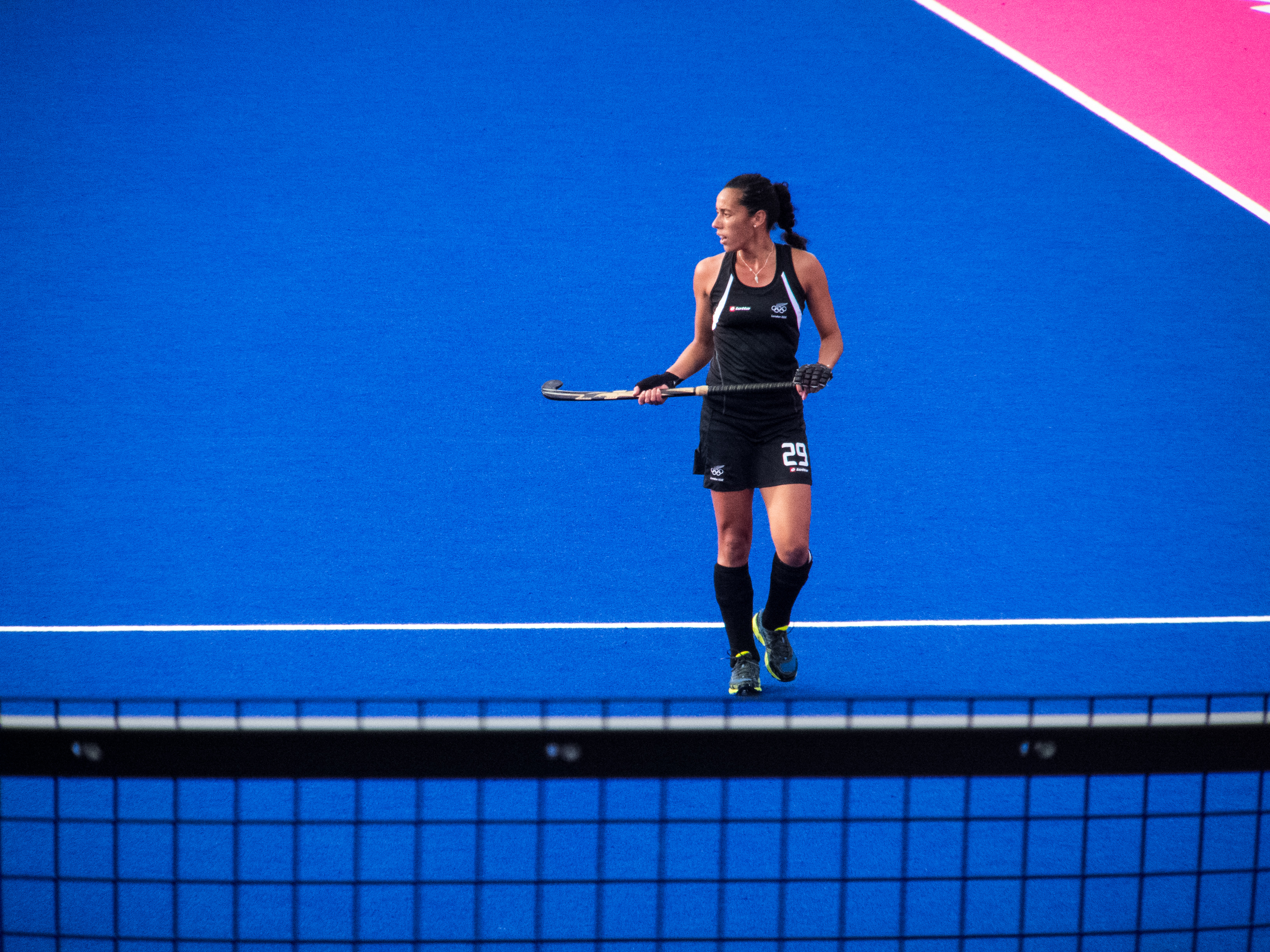
- Cooper at the 2012 London Olympics

Personal information
- Born: 16 March 1983 (age 43) New Plymouth, New Zealand
- Height: 1.69 m (5 ft 7 in)

Sport
- Sport: Field hockey
- Position: Defence / Midfield
National team
| Years | Team | Caps | Goals |
| 2001–2012 | New Zealand | 48 | (1) |

Melody Cooper (née Rowe, born 16 March 1983) is a New Zealand field hockey player. She has played in the midfield and defence positions. She played club hockey in New Zealand and in South Australia before representing New Zealand at the 2012 London Olympics. Melody was captain of the SA Suns team that won the Australian Hockey League Championship in 2011. In 2023 Cooper was appointed as a South Australian Ambassador for the Marjorie Jackson-Nelson Centre for Women’s Sport.

== Personal ==
Cooper is married to former Adelaide 36ers basketballer David Cooper and lives in Adelaide with their two children.

== Field hockey ==
=== Player ===
In 2011, Cooper captained the Southern Suns team from South Australia to victory in the Australian Hockey League championship in Darwin.

At the 2012 Summer Olympics, she competed for the New Zealand women's national field hockey team in the women's event. She played under coach Mark Hager where she was part of the team that defeated the Australian Hockeyroos (Australia women's national field hockey team) 1–0 in the opening game and went on to finish fourth.

=== Coach ===
Cooper previously coached Adelaide Hockey Club in 2012, 2013 and 2014 in the men's premier league competition in South Australia, culminating in a losing grand final in 2014.

In 2014, Cooper became the first woman to lead-coach a men's team in the Australian Hockey League with the Southern Hotshots. She was co-head coach with Mark Victory, older brother of Craig Victory. The Hotshots finished eighth.

In 2019, Cooper was the inaugural head coach of the Adelaide Fire women's team in the Hockey One League. The team lost in the semi-final to Queensland.

=== Administration ===
2022 Cooper was appointed the High Performance Director for the Adelaide Fire Men's and Women's Teams competing in the Hockey One League. Cooper joined the Hockey South Australia Board as a Non-Executive Director.

== Recognition ==
In 2014, she was named as Coach of the Year by Hockey SA in the South Australian Premier League Competition.
