= SA Suns =

Australian field hockey club

- City: Adelaide
- League: Australian Hockey League
- Founded: 1993
- Home arena: State Hockey Centre
- Colours: Yellow, Dark Blue, Red
- Head coach: Mark Dedman
- Captain: Jane Claxton, Karri McMahon
- Website: SA Suns

The SA Suns (formerly Southern Suns prior to 2015) are a women's field hockey team based in South Australia that competes in the Australian Hockey League (AHL). The SA Suns won national championships in 1995 and 2011.

== Team ==
=== 2018 ===
The following is the SA Suns team roster for the 2018 AHL:

Head coaches: Mark Dedman

1. Mariana Lagos
2. Jane Claxton (C)
3. Celeste Foord
4. Emily Grist
5. Holly Evans
6. Euleena MacLachlan
7. Amy Hunt
9. Alison Penington
10. Michaela Spano
11. Karri McMahon (C)
12. Ashleigh Morrison
16. Lucy Talbot
17. Leah Welstead
18. Amy Hammond (GK)
24. Hattie Shand
30. Ashlee Wells (GK)

=== 2015 ===
2015 SA Suns hockey team
Players	Coaching staff
Brooke Appleyard; Brooke Buchecker; Annie Busiko; Jane Claxton; Emily Grist; Samantha Hogan; Georgie Kiel; Euleena MacLachlan; Karri McMahon; Jessica Martin-Brown; Gabi Nance; Georgie Parker; Alison Pennington; Sally Rutherford; Lucy Talbot; Charlotte Van Bodegom; Leah Welstead	Head coach: Darren Neimke

== History ==
=== Name Changes ===
Since the founding of the Women's Australian Hockey League, the SA Suns have competed under five different names.

Name Changes
No.	Years	Name
1	1993–1996	Diet Coke Adelaide Suns
2	1997–1998, 2001–2007	Adelaide Suns
3	1999–2000	Adelaide Bank Suns
4	2008–2014	Southern Suns
5	2015–present	SA Suns

=== National Championships ===
==== 2011 Women's Australian Hockey League ====
At the 2011 AHL, the SA Suns won the Australian Hockey League for the second time.

This was the first time the SA Suns had won in 16 years, defeating the NSW Arrows 1–0 in the final.

The SA Suns lineup included Hockeyroo members Holly Evans, Bianca Greenshields, Georgie Parker and Elise Stacy. The team was also aided by New Zealand imports Melody Cooper, Clarissa Eshuis and Kayla Sharland. The team was coached by former Kookaburra, Craig Victory.

The team concluded the tournament with 7 wins, 2 draws and 2 losses, scoring 29 goals and conceding 14.

2011 SA Suns Lineup
Head coach
Craig Victory
Players
· Casey Bell · Brooklyn Buchecker · Jessica Cibich · Jane Claxton · Catherine Connolly · Melody Cooper · Clarissa Eshuis · Holly Evans	· Laura Germein · DeAnne Gilbert · Bianca Greenshields · Sarah Harrison · Georgie Kiel · Leesa McDonald · Anna McGregor · Karri McMahon	· Airlie Ogilvie · Georgie Parker · Janelle Pisani · Tess Reynolds · Kayla Sharland · Elise Stacy · Amy Watters

==== 1995 Women's Australian Hockey League ====
The SA Suns won their maiden Australian Hockey League title in 1995.

The team included 1992 Olympians and Hockeyroo members, Juliet Haslam OAM, Kate Allen OAM and Alison Peek OAM.

1984 Olympian Tricia Heberle was head coach of the team.

=== Previous Placings ===
The following table shows the SA Suns' final placings at the AHL since its founding.

SA Suns – Tournament History
Year	Position	Year	Position
1993	·	2006	· 5th
1994	· 5th	2007	· 8th
1995	· 1st	2008	· 5th
1996	·	2009	· 6th
1997	· 3rd	2010	· 5th
1998	·	2011	· 1st
1999	· 7th	2012	· 6th
2000	· 4th	2013	· 6th
2001	· 7th	2014	· 6th
2002	· 4th	2015	· 6th
2003	· 6th	2016	· 9th
2004	· 6th	2017	· 7th
2005	· 4th	2018	· 6th

== Notable players ==
Notable players who have played for the SA Suns include:

- Kate Allen
- Jane Claxton
- Melody Cooper
- Clarissa Eshuis (NZL)
- Holly Evans
- Juliet Haslam
- Bianca Joyce
- Mariana Lagos (CHL)
- Karri McMahon
- Gabrielle Nance
- Georgie Parker
- Alison Peek
- Kayla Sharland (NZL)
- Michaela Spano
- Lucy Talbot

== Coaches ==
Previous Head Coaches of the SA Suns have been:

- Mark Dedman (2016–present)
- Darren Neimke (2014-2016)
- Craig Victory (2011)
- Tricia Heberle (1993–1995)

== Home Stadium ==
The team's home stadium is the State Hockey Centre (South Australia) (also known as the Pines Stadium) which is located north of the Adelaide CBD in Gepps Cross. The stadium has a capacity of about 4,000 with 330 permanent seats. The stadium was used for the 1997 Men's Hockey Champions Trophy.

== Honour Roll ==
AHL Championships:	1995, 2011
AHL Finals Appearances:	1995, 2011
AHL Podium Finishes:	1995 (1st), 1996 (3rd), 2011 (1st)
AHL Player of the Tournament:	Karri McMahon (2013), Jane Claxton (2015)
AHL Player of the Final:	Kayla Sharland (2011)
