= State Hockey Centre (South Australia) =

Stadium in Gepps Cross, South Australia

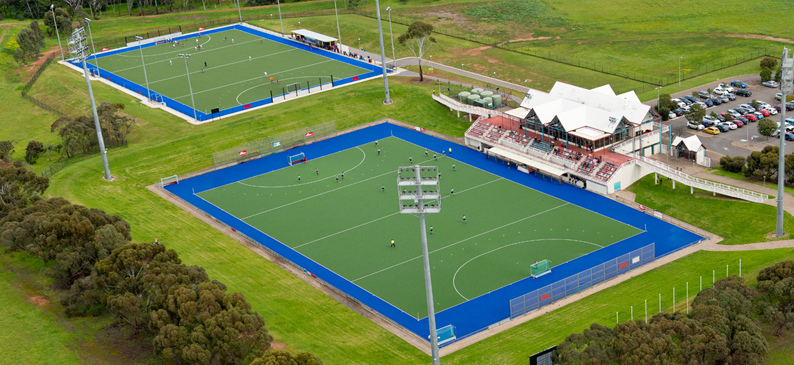
- Interactive map of State Hockey Centre
- Former names: The Pines Stadium; Distinctive Homes Hockey Stadium
- Location: State Sports Park, Main North Road, Gepps Cross, South Australia 5094
- Coordinates: 34°50′33″S 138°36′30″E
- Owner: South Australian Government
- Operator: Office of Recreation & Sport
- Capacity: 330 (fixed); 4,000 (temporary)
- Surface: FIH approved Class 1 System 5 Balsam water-based

Tenants
- Hockey SA; Men: Southern Hotshots (AHL) (1991-present); Women: Southern Suns (AHL) (1993-present); South Australian Gridiron Association (1997-2009)

The State Hockey Centre, currently known as MATE Stadium (from 2003 to 2009 known as the Pines Stadium and Distinctive Homes Hockey Arena), is a 4,000 capacity, government owned outdoor field hockey stadium located in Gepps Cross, a northern suburb of Adelaide, South Australia. It offers two international-standard wet hockey pitches which are used for both competition and training activities.

It is the home to the Southern Hotshots and SA Suns in the Australian Hockey League.

== Features ==
Pitch 1 has a 'TeamSports Surface - Auqaturf Evolution' surface and Pitch 2 has a 'STI - Poligras Olympia CoolPlus' surface.

The stadium has fixed seating capacity of 330 and room for a further 4,000 temporary seats.

The car park is capacity is 200 cars plus four disabled cars. Adjacent grassed areas to the west and north are used as overflow car parks for major events.

The State Hockey Centre upstairs area has a Main Function Area and adjoining Pak Poy Room, along with bar/cafeteria facilities.

A number of significant South Australian hockey identities are recognized in naming of parts of the hockey centre:

- Pitch One is named after inaugural groundsman Dave Scarman
- Patrick Pak Poy who helped to get the State Hockey Centre built originally has the 'Pak Poy' function room named after him
- The northern section of the grandstand is known as the Gerry Phillips Enclosure
- The central section of the grandstand is known as the Lorna Jolly Enclosure

== Uses ==
=== Hockey ===
The stadium is home to both Adelaide based teams in the Australian Hockey League, the men's SA Hotshots (formerly the Southern Hotshots) since 1991 and the women's SA Suns (formerly the Southern Suns) since 1993.

The stadium is home to Hockey SA, the peak body for hockey in South Australia, who utilize the facilities for state championships, state team training and other major events such as grand finals in the Hockey Metropolitan Competition.

It is used as the primary training facility for the South Australian Sports Institute hockey program.

The stadium is used for club hockey and is home to Burnside Hockey Club, Forestville Hockey Club and Grange Royals Hockey Club.

=== Gridiron ===
The venue was also home to South Australian Gridiron Association from 1997 until 2009.

=== Lacrosse ===
The stadium was used for major lacrosse events in the 1990s and 2000s. The stadium was sometimes referred to as "The Pines Hockey and Lacrosse Stadium"

=== Major events ===
The State Hockey Centre has played host to many major championships and events including:

- 1997 Men's Hockey Champions Trophy
- 2012 Hockey Australia U21 National Championships
- 2013 Hockey Australia Women's Masters National Championships
- 2014 Australian Hockey League Men and U13 Boys National Championships
- 2015 Hockey Australia U18 National Championships
- 2016 Hockey Australia Men's Masters National Championships
- 2017 Pacific School Games
- 2017 Hockeyroos vs Japan test series

== History of development ==
The stadium was built and opened in 1988, ahead of the cycling Adelaide Super-Drome being opened in the same sporting precinct.

It was opened in a ceremony by then Australian representative Paul Lewis, a Forestville Hockey Club player.

The venue's lighting was upgraded in 2013, and a second pitch was constructed costing $3.31 million.
