= 2009 Women's Hockey Junior World Cup squads =

This article lists the confirmed squads for the 2009 Women's FIH Hockey Junior World Cup tournament held in Boston, United States between 3 and 16 August 2009.

== Pool A ==
=== Chile ===
Head coach: Ronald Stein

1. Beatriz Wirth (GK)
2. Sofía Walbaum (C)
3. Javiera MacKenna
4. Constanza Sánchez
5. Camila Caram
6. María José MacKenna
7. Manuela Urroz
8. Paula Leniz
9. Josefa Villalabeitia
10. Marianna Pollmann
11. Andrea Greene
12. Valentina Cerda (GK)
13. Catalina Sclabos
14. Constanza Palma
15. Paula Liu
16. María Jesús Arestizabal
17. Tatiana Sclabos
18. Francisca Vidaurre

=== England ===
Head coach: Craig Parnham

1. Gemma Ible (GK)
2. Madeleine Hinch (GK)
3. Jennifer Hall
4. Sophie Bray
5. Kristy Dawson
6. Sara-Jo Coakley
7. Samantha Quek (C)
9. Susannah Townsend
10. Philippa Newton
11. Abigail Harper
12. Loren Sherer
14. Harriet Pearce
15. Charlotte Craddock
17. Lauren Turner
18. Georgina Twigg
19. Hollie Webb
20. Sarah Haycroft
22. Amy Turnbull

=== France ===
Head coach: Carole Thibaut Tefri

1. Alix Perrocheau
2. Perrine Roger
4. Marie-Julie Munch
5. Juliette Hevin
6. Fanny Verrier
7. Elise Preney (C)
8. Claire Sansonetti
9. Charlotte Boyer
11. Léa Langrenay
12. Margaux da Galzain
13. Louise Lebaindre
14. Elodie Broutain
15. Juliette Parent
17. Bulle Texier
19. Athena Richard
20. Apolline Rogeau
31. Sylvine da Cunha (GK)
32. Anne-Sophie Daire (GK)

=== South Korea ===
Head coach: Lim Heung-Sin

1. Cho Eun-Bee (GK)
2. Park Tae-Yang
3. Cheon Seul-Ki
4. Kim Hee-Jung
5. Kim Da-Young
6. Kim Ok-Ju
7. Lee Soo-Kyung
8. Hong Yoo-Jin
9. Park Ki-Ju
10. Kim Ah-Ra
11. Bae Ho-Syun
12. Yoo Jung-Mi
13. Jeon Yu-Mi
14. Kwon Yong-Kyung
15. Kim Ye-Jin
16. Oh Su-Jin (GK)
17. Lee Nam-Young (C)
18. Shim Ye-Jin

== Pool B ==
=== Argentina ===
Head coach: Guillermo Fonseca

1. Florencia Saravia (GK)
2. Delfina Merino
4. Josefina Wholfeiler
5. Rocío Sánchez Moccia
7. Ana Bertarini
8. Martina Cavallero
9. Carla Dupuy
10. Sofía Román
11. Romina Lozzia
12. Marisol Saenz (GK)
14. Natalia del Frari
15. Macarena Rojas
16. Luciana Soracco
20. Victoria Zuloaga (C)
21. María José Fernández
22. Florencia Calvete
24. Rocío González Canda
30. Josefina Sruoga

=== Germany ===
Head coach: Marc Herbert

1. Kim Platten (GK)
2. Karo Amm (GK)
3. Jana Teschke
6. Franzisca Hauke
7. Lisa Hapke
8. Pia Grambusch
9. Lisa Hahn
10. Nicole Pahl
11. Hannah Krüger (C)
12. Charlotte van Bodegom
13. Roda Müller-Wieland
14. Inga Stöckel
15. Hannah Pehle
16. Luisa Steindor
18. Anke Brockmann
22. Mia Sehlmann
24. Eva Frank
25. Céline Wilde

=== Lithuania ===
Head coach: James Young

1. Ieva Kuodytė (GK)
2. Ina Kenstavičiūtė
3. Ernesta Kalinauskaitė
4. Monika Vikaitė
5. Irmante Paulavičiūtė (GK)
6. Simona Grubliauskaitė (C)
7. Aiste Garbatavičiūtė
8. Evelina Malyševa
9. Raminta Žukaitė
10. Jurate Juodytė
12. Giedre Kvilonaitė
13. Ausra Bardauskaitė
14. Raimonda Nyderytė
16. Raimonda Nyderytė
17. Ramune Petrauskaitė
18. Evelina Neverdauskaitė

=== South Africa ===
Head coach: Fabian Gregory

1. Hanli Hattingh (GK)
2. Camille Jasson (GK)
3. Celia Evans
4. Philippa Rabey
5. Loreen Irvine (C)
6. Julia Cass
7. Kelly Madsen
8. Mapule Mokoena
9. Nicole Kemp
10. Sarah Harley
11. Jade Mayne
12. Kerry Pearton
13. Catherine McNulty
15. Candice Manuel
16. Sulette Damons
17. Nicolene Terblanche
18. Ncedisa Magwentshu
25. Louise Coertzen

== Pool C ==
=== China ===
Head coach: Jin Jianmin

1. Zhang Lei (GK)
2. Li Shufang
4. Zhang Ying
5. Bao Qianqian
6. Huang Ting
7. Liao Jiahui
8. De Jiaojiao
9. Zheng Qiuling
10. Zhao Yudiao
11. Zhang Wenting
12. Fu Lixin
14. Sun Yang
15. Sun Sinan (C)
17. Ye Yanmei
18. Huang Chenghong (GK)
19. Wang Zhishuang
20. Wang Mengyu
30. Liu Pan

=== Netherlands ===
Head coach: Sjoerd Marijne

1. Mirte van der Vliet (GK)
2. Juliette Hentenaar
3. Floortje Verheul
4. Kitty van Male
5. Roos Stam
6. Michelle van der Pols
7. Ireen van den Assem
9. Elsemiek Groen
10. Kelly Jonker
11. Margot van Geffen
12. Caia van Maasakker
13. Joyce Sombroek (GK)
14. Fleur van Dooren
16. Kiki Collot d'Escury (C)
18. Willemijn Bos
20. Jacky Schoenaker
21. Emilie Mol
22. Willemijn Willemse

=== New Zealand ===
Head coach: Chris Leslie

1. Gemma Flynn
3. Bridget Blackwood
5. Carli Michelsen
6. Cathryn Finlayson
7. Danielle Jones
8. Stacey Michelsen
9. Frances Shaw
10. Jacinda McLeod
12. Kate Savory
13. Katie Glynn
14. Elizabeth Gunson
15. Lucy Talbot (C)
17. Taelar Samuel (GK)
18. Nicola Howes (GK)
19. Sophie Devine
20. Fiona Morrison
21. Petrea Webster
22. Natasha FitzSimons

=== Spain ===
Head coach: Angel Laso

1. Mélani García (GK)
2. Naiara Altuna (C)
3. Anna Lloveras
4. Carla Martínez
5. Andrea Puig
7. Carlota Petchamé
8. Marta Martín
9. María López
10. Berta Bonastre
11. Empar Gil
12. Beatriz Pérez
13. Olatz Goñi
14. Virginia Egusquiza
15. Maialen García
16. María Ruíz (GK)
17. Paula Pastor
18. Georgina Oliva
20. Lola Riera

== Pool D ==
=== Australia ===
Head coach: Katrina Powell

2. Georgia Nanscawen
4. Casey Eastham (C)
5. Tamsin Lee
6. Jill Dwyer
7. Rachel Miller
8. Tegan Holcroft
9. Marnie Hudson
10. Hannah Cohen
11. Emily Hurtz
12. Jade Warrender
14. Ashlee Wells (GK)
15. Kate Denning
16. Heather Langham
18. Bianca Greenshields (C)
19. Kate Jenner
24. Harriet Moore (GK)
26. Danielle Schubach
28. Anna Flanagan

=== Belarus ===
Head coach: Heorhi Belski

2. Rehina Sycheuskaya
3. Khrystsina Kibkova
4. Alena Fedarovich
5. Hrazhyna Verameichyk
6. Sviatlana Bahushevich
7. Volha Kazak
8. Volha Nikitsenka
9. Hanna Vaitkevich
11. Yuliya Mikhenichik (C)
12. Verinka Mikanovich (GK)
13. Anastassiya Tomal
14. Natallia Stsiafutkina
15. Nastassia Shcharbakova
16. Krestsina Kulinkovich
17. Alena Hladkaya
22. Yauheniya Lestko (GK)

=== India ===
Head coach: M.K. Kaushik

2. Sandeep Kaur
3. Savita Punia (GK)
6. Kirandeep Kaur
7. Rosalind Ralte
8. Monika Badran
11. Poonam Rani
13. Joydeep Kaur Saggu
14. Preety Sunila Kiro
15. Ritu Rani
16. Vandana Kataria
18. Asem Manorama Devi
20. Jasdeep Kaur (GK)
21. Yendala Soundarya
23. Sulochana Kishan
24. Roselin Dung Dung
27. Ranjita Devi Thockchom (C)
28. Rani Devi
29. Kiran Dahiya

=== United States ===
Head coach: Tracey Fuchs

2. Camille Gandhi
3. Tara Puffenberger
4. Alexis Pappas
5. Brianna Davies
7. Kelsey Kolojejchick
9. Michelle Vittese
10. Paige Selenski
13. Melissa González
14. Katherine Reinprecht
15. Elizabeth Drazdowski
16. Kathleen O'Donnell (C)
17. Marta Malmberg
18. Julia Reinprecht
19. Rayell Heistand
20. Jaclyn Kintzer (GK)
21. Laura Gerbhart
23. Katelyn Falgowski
32. Alesha Widdall (GK)
