= 2011 Women's Australian Hockey League =

Tournament details
- Host country: Australia
- Teams: 8
- Venue: 5 (in 5 host cities)

Final positions
- Champions: (South Australia) Southern Suns (2nd title)
- Runner-up: (New South Wales) NSW Arrows
- Third place: (Western Australia) WA Diamonds

Tournament statistics
- Matches played: 44
- Goals scored: 199 (4.52 per match)
- Top scorer(s): (Tasmania) Sofie McLeod (Western Australia) Ashleigh Nelson (9 goals)
- Best player: (Queensland) Jodie Schulz

The 2011 Women's Australian Hockey League was the 19th edition of the women's field hockey tournament. The finals week of the tournament was held in the Northern Territory city of Darwin.

The Southern Suns won the gold medal for the second time by defeating the NSW Arrows 1–0 in the final.

== Competition format ==
The format included five-round matches over two weekends and a finals week that consisted of two-round matches and three pool matches for a place in the final.

After all the round matches were complete the teams were ranked 1–8 depending on the total number of points earned in all their round matches.

The teams ranked 1, 4, 5 & 8 went into pool A and the teams ranked 2, 3, 6 & 7 went into pool B. All previously earned points were removed with the teams in each pool playing each other once more. At the completion of the pool matches the teams in each pool were ranked again 1–4 depending on the number of points accumulated, with the top team from each pool competing in the League Final and classification matches to determine the remaining six team's final positions.

== Teams ==
- (Australian Capital Territory) ACT Strikers
- (South Australia) Southern Suns
- (New South Wales) NSW Arrows
- (Tasmania) Tassie Van Demons
- (Northern Territory) NT Pearls
- (Victoria (state)) VIC Vipers
- (Queensland) QLD Scorchers
- (Western Australia) WA Diamonds

== Venues ==
| Sydney | 2011 Women's Australian Hockey League is located in Australia |
|---|---|
| Sydney Olympic Park | 2011 Women's Australian Hockey League is located in Australia |
| Capacity: 8,000 | 2011 Women's Australian Hockey League is located in Australia |
| Melbourne | 2011 Women's Australian Hockey League is located in Australia |
| State Netball Hockey Centre | 2011 Women's Australian Hockey League is located in Australia |
| Capacity: 8,000 | 2011 Women's Australian Hockey League is located in Australia |
| Adelaide | 2011 Women's Australian Hockey League is located in Australia |
| State Hockey Centre | 2011 Women's Australian Hockey League is located in Australia |
| Capacity: 4,000 | 2011 Women's Australian Hockey League is located in Australia |
Cairns
Cairns North Sports Precinct
Darwin
Marrara Hockey Centre

== Results ==
=== Preliminary round ===
| Pos | Team | Pld | W | D | L | GF | GA | GD | Pts | Qualification |
|---|---|---|---|---|---|---|---|---|---|---|
| 1 | (Victoria (state)) VIC Vipers | 7 | 6 | 0 | 1 | 21 | 3 | +18 | 18 | Pool A |
| 2 | (Queensland) QLD Scorchers | 7 | 6 | 0 | 1 | 24 | 9 | +15 | 18 | Pool B |
| 3 | (New South Wales) NSW Arrows | 7 | 5 | 0 | 2 | 20 | 7 | +13 | 15 | Pool B |
| 4 | (South Australia) Southern Suns | 7 | 4 | 1 | 2 | 19 | 10 | +9 | 13 | Pool A |
| 5 | (Western Australia) WA Diamonds | 7 | 2 | 1 | 4 | 22 | 17 | +5 | 7 | Pool A |
| 6 | (Tasmania) Tassie Van Demons | 7 | 2 | 0 | 5 | 14 | 28 | −14 | 6 | Pool B |
| 7 | (Australian Capital Territory) ACT Strikers | 7 | 1 | 2 | 4 | 9 | 19 | −10 | 5 | Pool B |
| 8 | (Northern Territory) NT Pearls | 7 | 0 | 0 | 7 | 1 | 37 | −36 | 0 | Pool A |

Source: Clearing House

==== Round matches ====
6 May 2011
17:00

| Tassie Van Demons (Tasmania) | 0–5 | (Victoria (state)) VIC Vipers |
|---|---|---|
| | Report | Purser 8'; Nanscawen 14'; Joseph 17'; Trost 38'; Schubach 41' |

Stadium:
Sydney Olympic Park, Sydney

6 May 2011
17:00

| QLD Scorchers (Queensland) | 3–2 | (Western Australia) WA Diamonds |
|---|---|---|
| Ashton 22', 68'; Schulz 32' | Report | A. Nelson 57', 61' |

Stadium:
State Hockey Centre, Adelaide

6 May 2011
19:00

| ACT Strikers (Australian Capital Territory) | 0–2 | (New South Wales) NSW Arrows |
|---|---|---|
| | Report | Webster 10'; Close 41' |

Stadium:
Sydney Olympic Park, Sydney

6 May 2011
19:00

| NT Pearls (Northern Territory) | 0–6 | (South Australia) Southern Suns |
|---|---|---|
| | Report | Evans 4', 28'; Eshuis 17', 63'; Buchecker 54', 55' |

Stadium:
State Hockey Centre, Adelaide

7 May 2011
15:00

| ACT Strikers (Australian Capital Territory) | 0–6 | (Victoria (state)) VIC Vipers |
|---|---|---|
| | Report | Trost 25'; Peake 26'; Messent 34'; Schubach 46'; Riordan 53'; Nanscawen 55' |

Stadium:
Sydney Olympic Park, Sydney

7 May 2011
15:00

| Southern Suns (South Australia) | 4–3 | (Western Australia) WA Diamonds |
|---|---|---|
| Kiel 14'; Pisani 33', 66'; Sharland 47' | Report | McGurk 18'; A. Nelson 55'; Symons 66' |

Stadium:
State Hockey Centre, Adelaide

7 May 2011
17:00

| NSW Arrows (New South Wales) | 6–1 | (Tasmania) Tassie Van Demons |
|---|---|---|
| Phillips 14', 17', 65'; White 42', 62'; Close 46' | Report | Calvert 54' |

Stadium:
Sydney Olympic Park, Sydney

7 May 2011
17:00

| QLD Scorchers (Queensland) | 6–0 | (Northern Territory) NT Pearls |
|---|---|---|
| Schulz 11', 23', 45'; Ashton 29'; Johnson 31'; Holcroft 43' | Report |

Stadium:
State Hockey Centre, Adelaide

8 May 2011
13:00

| Tassie Van Demons (Tasmania) | 4–1 | (Australian Capital Territory) ACT Strikers |
|---|---|---|
| McLeod 29', 42'; Wilson 37', 42' | Report | M. Bone 70' |

Stadium:
Sydney Olympic Park, Sydney

8 May 2011
13:00

| Southern Suns (South Australia) | 3–2 | (Queensland) QLD Scorchers |
|---|---|---|
| McMahon 22'; Buchecker 45'; Eshuis 70' | Report | Blyth 31'; Olivieri 55' |

Stadium:
State Hockey Centre, Adelaide

8 May 2011
15:00

| VIC Vipers (Victoria (state)) | 2–1 | (New South Wales) NSW Arrows |
|---|---|---|
| Messent 1'; Trost 69' | Report | White 58' |

Stadium:
Sydney Olympic Park, Sydney

8 May 2011
15:00

| WA Diamonds (Western Australia) | 8–0 | (Northern Territory) NT Pearls |
|---|---|---|
| Si. Nelson 6'; Pascov 17'; Symons 37'; Liddelow 47'; McGurk 57', 62'; Smith 59'; Denning 64' | Report |

Stadium:
State Hockey Centre, Adelaide

21 May 2011
12:00

| ACT Strikers (Australian Capital Territory) | 2–2 | (Western Australia) WA Diamonds |
|---|---|---|
| Michelsen 5'; McGowan 21' | Report | McGurk 32'; Pascov 48' |

Stadium:
State Netball Hockey Centre, Melbourne

21 May 2011
14:00

| Southern Suns (South Australia) | 0–1 | (Victoria (state)) VIC Vipers |
|---|---|---|
| | Report | Riordan 42' |

Stadium:
State Netball Hockey Centre, Melbourne

21 May 2011
17:00

| Tassie Van Demons (Tasmania) | 6–1 | (Northern Territory) NT Pearls |
|---|---|---|
| K. Pearce 28'; McLeod 42'; Wilson 50'; F. Pearce 60'; Calvert 64'; Cooling 67' | Report | Langham 35' |

Stadium:
Cairns North Sports Precinct, Cairns

21 May 2011
19:00

| QLD Scorchers (Queensland) | 3–1 | (New South Wales) NSW Arrows |
|---|---|---|
| Korner 46', 55'; Blyth 68' | Report | Purdy 21' |

Stadium:
Cairns North Sports Precinct, Cairns

22 May 2011
12:00

| VIC Vipers (Victoria (state)) | 2–0 | (Western Australia) WA Diamonds |
|---|---|---|
| Riordan 17'; Nanscawen 35' | Report |

Stadium:
State Netball Hockey Centre, Melbourne

22 May 2011
14:00

| Southern Suns (South Australia) | 2–2 | (Australian Capital Territory) ACT Strikers |
|---|---|---|
| Reynolds 5'; Buchecker 42' | Report | Glynn 24', 65' |

Stadium:
State Netball Hockey Centre, Melbourne

22 May 2011
14:30

| NSW Arrows (New South Wales) | 5–0 | (Northern Territory) NT Pearls |
|---|---|---|
| Close 23', 33'; Rivers 26'; Purdy 47'; Phillips 63' | Report |

Stadium:
Cairns North Sports Precinct, Cairns

22 May 2011
16:30

| QLD Scortchers (Queensland) | 5–0 | (Tasmania) Tassie Van Demons |
|---|---|---|
| Ashton 14'; Schulz 20'; Holcroft 55'; Olivieri 63'; J. Dwyer 68' | Report |

Stadium:
Cairns North Sports Precinct, Cairns

28 May 2011
14:00

| NSW Arrows (New South Wales) | 1–0 | (South Australia) Southern Suns |
|---|---|---|
| Hurtz 32' | Report |

Stadium:
Marrara Hockey Centre, Darwin

28 May 2011
16:00

| QLD Scorchers (Queensland) | 2–1 | (Victoria (state)) VIC Vipers |
|---|---|---|
| Korner 8'; Olivieri 14' | Report | Schubach 39' |

Stadium:
Marrara Hockey Centre, Darwin

28 May 2011
18:00

| NT Pearls (Northern Territory) | 0–2 | (Australian Capital Territory) ACT Strikers |
|---|---|---|
| | Report | Underwood 57'; Evans 58' |

Stadium:
Marrara Hockey Centre, Darwin

28 May 2011
20:00

| Tassie Van Demons (Tasmania) | 2–6 | (Western Australia) WA Diamonds |
|---|---|---|
| McLeod 1', 37' | Report | Boyce 27'; A. Nelson 39', 62'; Sh. Nelson 59', 61'; Liddelow 67' |

Stadium:
Marrara Hockey Centre, Darwin

29 May 2011
14:00

| NT Pearls (Northern Territory) | 0–4 | (Victoria (state)) VIC Vipers |
|---|---|---|
| | Report | Nanscawen 10', 70'; Messent 18'; Berriman 48' |

Stadium:
Marrara Hockey Centre, Darwin

29 May 2011
16:00

| Southern Suns (South Australia) | 4–1 | (Tasmania) Tassie Van Demons |
|---|---|---|
| Eshuis 12'; Reynolds 32', 45'; Evans 63' | Report | F. Pearce 56' |

Stadium:
Marrara Hockey Centre, Darwin

29 May 2011
18:00

| QLD Scorchers (Queensland) | 3–2 | (Australian Capital Territory) ACT Strikers |
|---|---|---|
| Olivieri 12'; Hudson 41'; Ashton 60' | Report | Glynn 19'; M. Bone 65' |

Stadium:
Marrara Hockey Centre, Darwin

29 May 2011
20:00

| WA Diamonds (Western Australia) | 1–4 | (New South Wales) NSW Arrows |
|---|---|---|
| A. Nelson 41' | Report | White 19'; Hurtz 42'; Webster 60'; Rivers 63' |

Stadium:
Marrara Hockey Centre, Darwin

=== Classification round ===
==== Pool matches ====
===== Pool A =====
| Pos | Team | Pld | W | D | L | GF | GA | GD | Pts |
|---|---|---|---|---|---|---|---|---|---|
| 1 | (South Australia) Southern Suns | 3 | 2 | 1 | 0 | 9 | 4 | +5 | 7 |
| 2 | (Western Australia) WA Diamonds | 3 | 2 | 0 | 1 | 14 | 3 | +11 | 6 |
| 3 | (Victoria (state)) VIC Vipers | 3 | 1 | 1 | 1 | 6 | 2 | +4 | 4 |
| 4 | (Northern Territory) NT Pearls | 3 | 0 | 0 | 3 | 1 | 21 | −20 | 0 |

Source: Clearing House

31 May 2011
14:00

| Southern Suns (South Australia) | 3–2 | (Western Australia) WA Diamonds |
|---|---|---|
| Parker 27', 47'; Reynolds 70' | Report | Munro 64'; Symons 67' |

Stadium:
Marrara Hockey Centre, Darwin

31 May 2011
18:00

| VIC Vipers (Victoria (state)) | 5–0 | (Northern Territory) NT Pearls |
|---|---|---|
| Riordan 4', 65', 66', 70'; Trost 32' | Report |

Stadium:
Marrara Hockey Centre, Darwin

1 June 2011
14:00

| Southern Suns (South Australia) | 5–1 | (Northern Territory) NT Pearls |
|---|---|---|
| Connolly 6'; McMahon 34'; Buchecker 37'; Eshuis 47'; Greenshields 65' | Report | Eiser 26' |

Stadium:
Marrara Hockey Centre, Darwin

1 June 2011
20:00

| VIC Vipers (Victoria (state)) | 0–1 | (Western Australia) WA Diamonds |
|---|---|---|
| | Report | A. Nelson 5' |

Stadium:
Marrara Hockey Centre, Darwin

2 June 2011
16:00

| WA Diamonds (Western Australia) | 11–0 | (Northern Territory) NT Pearls |
|---|---|---|
| Searle 15', 34'; A. Nelson 17', 55'; Boyce 41', 31'; Munro 33'; Si. Nelson 51'; Ciallella 57', 58'; Denning 68' | Report |

Stadium:
Marrara Hockey Centre, Darwin

2 June 2011
18:00

| VIC Vipers (Victoria (state)) | 1–1 | (South Australia) Southern Suns |
|---|---|---|
| Riordan 29' | Report | Buchecker 34' |

Stadium:
Marrara Hockey Centre, Darwin

===== Pool B =====
| Pos | Team | Pld | W | D | L | GF | GA | GD | Pts |
|---|---|---|---|---|---|---|---|---|---|
| 1 | (New South Wales) NSW Arrows | 3 | 3 | 0 | 0 | 10 | 1 | +9 | 9 |
| 2 | (Queensland) QLD Scorchers | 3 | 2 | 0 | 1 | 5 | 3 | +2 | 6 |
| 3 | (Australian Capital Territory) ACT Strikers | 3 | 0 | 1 | 2 | 3 | 6 | −3 | 1 |
| 4 | (Tasmania) Tassie Van Demons | 3 | 0 | 1 | 2 | 4 | 12 | −8 | 1 |

Source: Clearing House

31 May 2011
16:00

| NSW Arrows (New South Wales) | 7–0 | (Tasmania) Tassie Van Demons |
|---|---|---|
| Hollywood 3'; Cobbin 10'; Rivers 31'; White 41'; Close 50'; Hurtz 57'; Smith 65' | Report |

Stadium:
Marrara Hockey Centre, Darwin

31 May 2011
20:00

| QLD Scorchers (Queensland) | 2–0 | (Australian Capital Territory) ACT Strikers |
|---|---|---|
| Korner 12'; Ashton 65' | Report |

Stadium:
Marrara Hockey Centre, Darwin

1 June 2011
16:00

| NSW Arrows (New South Wales) | 2–1 | (Australian Capital Territory) ACT Strikers |
|---|---|---|
| Cobbin 40'; Webster 45' | Report | Glynn 24' |

Stadium:
Marrara Hockey Centre, Darwin

1 June 2011
18:00

| QLD Scorchers (Queensland) | 3–2 | (Tasmania) Tassie Van Demons |
|---|---|---|
| Blyth 40', 59'; Ashton 50' | Report | Wilson 2'; McLeod 46' |

Stadium:
Marrara Hockey Centre, Darwin

2 June 2011
14:00

| Tassie Van Demons (Tasmania) | 2–2 | (Australian Capital Territory) ACT Strikers |
|---|---|---|
| McLeod 18', 63' | Report | Evans 21'; Underwood 63' |

Stadium:
Marrara Hockey Centre, Darwin

2 June 2011
20:00

| QLD Scorchers (Queensland) | 0–1 | (New South Wales) NSW Arrows |
|---|---|---|
| | Report | Webster 4' |

Stadium:
Marrara Hockey Centre, Darwin

==== Classification matches ====
===== Seventh and eighth place =====
4 June 2011
14:00

| NT Pearls (Northern Territory) | 3–2 (a.e.t.) | (Tasmania) Tassie Van Demons |
|---|---|---|
| Pointer 21'; Van Der Kruijs 34', 79' | Report | K. Pearce 15'; McLeod 37' |

Stadium:
Marrara Hockey Centre, Darwin

===== Fifth and sixth place =====
4 June 2011
16:00

| ACT Strikers (Australian Capital Territory) | 4–0 | (Victoria (state)) VIC Vipers |
|---|---|---|
| McGowan 33'; Michelsen 44'; Glynn 49', 70' | Report |

Stadium:
Marrara Hockey Centre, Darwin

===== Third and fourth place =====
4 June 2011
18:00

| WA Diamonds (Western Australia) | 4–3 | (Queensland) QLD Scorchers |
|---|---|---|
| Liddelow 6'; Ciallella 18'; Munro 35'; Si. Nelson 62' | Report | Olivieri 12'; Schulz 27'; Korner 69' |

Stadium:
Marrara Hockey Centre, Darwin

===== Final =====
4 June 2011
20:00

| Southern Suns (South Australia) | 1–0 | (New South Wales) NSW Arrows |
|---|---|---|
| Parker 33' | Report |

Stadium:
Marrara Hockey Centre, Darwin

== Awards ==
| Top Goalscorer | Player of the Tournament | Player of the Final |
|---|---|---|
| (Tasmania) Sofie McLeod (Western Australia) Ashleigh Nelson | (Queensland) Jodie Schulz | (South Australia) Kayla Sharland |

== Statistics ==
=== Final standings ===
| Pos | Team | Pld | W | D | L | GF | GA | GD | Pts | Final Result |
|---|---|---|---|---|---|---|---|---|---|---|
| 1st place, gold medalist(s) | (South Australia) Southern Suns | 11 | 7 | 2 | 2 | 29 | 14 | +15 | 23 | Gold Medal |
| 2nd place, silver medalist(s) | (New South Wales) NSW Arrows | 11 | 8 | 0 | 3 | 30 | 9 | +21 | 24 | Silver Medal |
| 3rd place, bronze medalist(s) | (Western Australia) WA Diamonds | 11 | 5 | 1 | 5 | 40 | 23 | +17 | 16 | Bronze Medal |
| 4 | (Queensland) QLD Scorchers | 11 | 8 | 0 | 3 | 32 | 16 | +16 | 24 | |
| 5 | (Australian Capital Territory) ACT Strikers | 11 | 2 | 3 | 6 | 16 | 25 | −9 | 9 | |
| 6 | (Victoria (state)) VIC Vipers | 11 | 7 | 1 | 3 | 27 | 9 | +18 | 22 | |
| 7 | (Northern Territory) NT Pearls | 11 | 1 | 0 | 10 | 5 | 60 | −55 | 3 | |
| 8 | (Tasmania) Tassie Van Demons | 11 | 2 | 1 | 8 | 20 | 43 | −23 | 7 | |

Source: Clearing House

=== Goalscorers ===
There were 199 goals scored in 44 matches, for an average of 4.52 goals per match.

9 goals

- (Tasmania) Sofie McLeod
- (Western Australia) Ashleigh Nelson

8 goals

- (Victoria (state)) Stephanie Riordan

7 goals

- (Queensland) Renee Ashton

6 goals

- (Australian Capital Territory) Katie Glynn
- (Queensland) Jodie Schulz
- (South Australia) Brooklyn Buchecker

5 goals

- (New South Wales) Kellie White
- (New South Wales) Jade Close
- (Queensland) Kandice Olivieri
- (Queensland) Amy Korner
- (South Australia) Clarissa Eshuis
- (Victoria (state)) Georgia Nanscawen

4 goals

- (New South Wales) Yasmine Phillips
- (New South Wales) Hollie Webster
- (Queensland) Madonna Blyth
- (South Australia) Tess Reynolds
- (Tasmania) Emily Wilson
- (Victoria (state)) Renee Trost
- (Western Australia) Kobie McGurk

3 goals

- (New South Wales) Megan Rivers
- (New South Wales) Emily Hurtz
- (South Australia) Holly Evans
- (South Australia) Georgie Parker
- (Victoria (state)) Danielle Schubach
- (Victoria (state)) Claire Messent
- (Western Australia) Katy Symons
- (Western Australia) Sian Nelson
- (Western Australia) Shelly Liddelow
- (Western Australia) Fiona Boyce
- (Western Australia) Hope Munro
- (Western Australia) Chantelle Ciallella

2 goals

- (Australian Capital Territory) Stacey Michelsen
- (Australian Capital Territory) Meredith Bone
- (Australian Capital Territory) Courtney McGowan
- (Australian Capital Territory) Christie Underwood
- (Australian Capital Territory) Naomi Evans
- (New South Wales) Stephanie Purdy
- (New South Wales) Emma Cobbin
- (Northern Territory) Thisja Van Der Kruijs
- (Queensland) Tegan Holcroft
- (South Australia) Janelle Pisani
- (South Australia) Karri McMahon
- (Tasmania) Hannah Calvert
- (Tasmania) Kirsten Pearce
- (Tasmania) Fiona Pearce
- (Western Australia) Jodie Searle
- (Western Australia) Shayni Nelson
- (Western Australia) Kate Denning
- (Western Australia) Caitlin Pascov

1 goal

- (New South Wales) Emily Smith
- (New South Wales) Kate Hollywood
- (Northern Territory) Heather Langham
- (Northern Territory) Ashlee Pointer
- (Northern Territory) Tammy Eiser
- (Queensland) Jill Dwyer
- (Queensland) Marnie Hudson
- (Queensland) Kirstin Johnson
- (South Australia) Kayla Sharland
- (South Australia) Bianca Greenshields
- (South Australia) Catherine Connolly
- (South Australia) Georgie Kiel
- (Tasmania) Michelle Cooling
- (Victoria (state)) Hana Peake
- (Victoria (state)) Megan Berriman
- (Victoria (state)) Stacia Joseph
- (Victoria (state)) Tegan Purser
- (Western Australia) Katelyn Smith

Source: Clearing House
