= 2010 Women's Australian Hockey League =

Tournament details
- Host country: Australia
- City: Adelaide (finals venue)
- Teams: 8
- Venue: State Hockey Centre

Final positions
- Champions: (Western Australia) WA Diamonds (6th title)
- Runner-up: (Queensland) QLD Scorchers
- Third place: (New South Wales) NSW Arrows

Tournament statistics
- Matches played: 44
- Goals scored: 163 (3.7 per match)
- Top scorer: (Western Australia) Ashleigh Nelson (9 goals)
- Best player: (Queensland) Madonna Blyth

The 2010 Women's Australian Hockey League was the 18th edition of the women's field hockey tournament. The finals week of the tournament was held in the South Australian city of Adelaide.

The WA Diamonds won the gold medal for the sixth time by defeating the QLD Scorchers 3–1 in the final.

== Competition format ==
The format included five-round matches over two weekends, and a finals week that consisted of two-round matches, three pool matches and finally classification matches.

At the conclusion of the round matches teams were sorted in Pool A or Pool B, based on ranking.

Pool A: 1, 4, 6, 8
Pool B: 2, 3, 5, 7

Points were carried over from the round matches, so at the conclusion of the pool matches the teams in each pool were ranked again 1–4 depending on the number of points accumulated, with the top team from each pool competing in the League Final, while classification matches were contested to determine the remaining six teams' final positions.

== Teams ==
- (Australian Capital Territory) Canberra Strikers
- (South Australia) Southern Suns
- (New South Wales) NSW Arrows
- (Tasmania) Tassie Van Demons
- (Northern Territory) Territory Pearls
- (Victoria (state)) VIC Vipers
- (Queensland) QLD Scorchers
- (Western Australia) WA Diamonds

== Results ==
=== Preliminary round ===
| Pos | Team | Pld | W | D | L | GF | GA | GD | Pts | Qualification |
|---|---|---|---|---|---|---|---|---|---|---|
| 1 | (Western Australia) WA Diamonds | 7 | 5 | 2 | 0 | 23 | 6 | +17 | 54 | Pool A |
| 2 | (Queensland) QLD Scorchers | 7 | 5 | 1 | 1 | 21 | 10 | +11 | 48 | Pool B |
| 3 | (New South Wales) NSW Arrows | 7 | 4 | 1 | 2 | 20 | 11 | +9 | 43 | Pool B |
| 4 | (Victoria (state)) VIC Vipers | 7 | 3 | 2 | 2 | 14 | 11 | +3 | 37 | Pool A |
| 5 | (South Australia) Southern Suns | 7 | 3 | 1 | 3 | 16 | 18 | −2 | 35 | Pool B |
| 6 | (Australian Capital Territory) Canberra Strikers | 7 | 3 | 0 | 4 | 12 | 14 | −2 | 30 | Pool A |
| 7 | (Tasmania) Tassie Van Demons | 7 | 0 | 2 | 5 | 4 | 21 | −17 | 10 | Pool B |
| 8 | (Northern Territory) Territory Pearls | 7 | 0 | 1 | 6 | 3 | 22 | −19 | 6 | Pool A |

Source: Hockey Australia

==== Round matches ====
7 May 2010

| Canberra Strikers (Australian Capital Territory) | 2–1 | (Victoria (state)) VIC Vipers |
|---|---|---|
| Flanagan 10'; Ellis 41' | Report | Riordan 50' |

Stadium:
Tasmanian Hockey Centre, Hobart

7 May 2010

| NSW Arrows (New South Wales) | 6–1 | (Tasmania) Tassie Van Demons |
|---|---|---|
| Hurtz 12', 31', 39'; Close 27'; Jenner 56'; Webster 67' | Report | Khoury 63' |

Stadium:
Tasmanian Hockey Centre, Hobart

7 May 2010

| WA Diamonds (Western Australia) | 3–0 | (Northern Territory) Territory Pearls |
|---|---|---|
| S. Nelson 9'; Ciallella 28'; Boyce 61' | Report |

Stadium:
Marrara Hockey Centre, Darwin

7 May 2010

| QLD Scorchers (Queensland) | 4–2 | (South Australia) Southern Suns |
|---|---|---|
| Holcroft 4', 68'; Hudson 30'; Holzberger 34' | Report | Cibich 39'; Reynolds 60' |

Stadium:
Marrara Hockey Centre, Darwin

8 May 2010

| NSW Arrows (New South Wales) | 3–2 | (Australian Capital Territory) Canberra Strikers |
|---|---|---|
| Cobbin 27'; Hurtz 56'; Jenner 70' | Report | Bailey-Price 18'; Flanagan 62' |

Stadium:
Tasmanian Hockey Centre, Hobart

8 May 2010

| QLD Scorchers (Queensland) | 7–1 | (Northern Territory) Territory Pearls |
|---|---|---|
| Korner 12'; Schulz 15'; Blyth 28', 43'; Eiser 40'; J. Dwyer 45'; Johnson 47' | Report | Langham 56' |

Stadium:
Marrara Hockey Centre, Darwin

8 May 2010

| Tassie Van Demons (Tasmania) | 1–1 | (Victoria (state)) VIC Vipers |
|---|---|---|
| McLeod 42' | Report | Riordan 48' |

Stadium:
Tasmanian Hockey Centre, Hobart

8 May 2010

| WA Diamonds (Western Australia) | 5–0 | (South Australia) Southern Suns |
|---|---|---|
| A. Nelson 5'; Taylor 25'; S. Nelson 38', 67'; Eglington 54' | Report |

Stadium:
Marrara Hockey Centre, Darwin

9 May 2010

| Southern Suns (South Australia) | 2–1 | (Northern Territory) Territory Pearls |
|---|---|---|
| Parker 17'; Greenshields 62' | Report | Peris 40' |

Stadium:
Marrara Hockey Centre, Darwin

9 May 2010

| NSW Arrows (New South Wales) | 4–1 | (Victoria (state)) VIC Vipers |
|---|---|---|
| Rivers 9'; Hurtz 31', 52'; Phillips 43' | Report | Schubach 37' |

Stadium:
Tasmanian Hockey Centre, Hobart

9 May 2010

| WA Diamonds (Western Australia) | 2–2 | (Queensland) QLD Scorchers |
|---|---|---|
| A. Nelson 33'; S. Nelson 54' | Report | J. Dwyer 13'; Attard 59' |

Stadium:
Marrara Hockey Centre, Darwin

9 May 2010

| Canberra Strikers (Australian Capital Territory) | 1–0 | (Tasmania) Tassie Van Demons |
|---|---|---|
| Youman 48' | Report |

Stadium:
Tasmanian Hockey Centre, Hobart

22 May 2010

| QLD Scorchers (Queensland) | 2–1 | (Australian Capital Territory) Canberra Strikers |
|---|---|---|
| Korner 14', 66' | Report | Arrold 65' |

Stadium:
Queensland State Hockey Centre, Brisbane

22 May 2010

| VIC Vipers (Victoria (state)) | 3–2 | (South Australia) Southern Suns |
|---|---|---|
| Burns 17'; Merrett 22'; O'Connor 50' | Report | McMahon 14'; Evans 25' |

Stadium:
Perth Hockey Stadium, Perth

22 May 2010

| NSW Arrows (New South Wales) | 3–0 | (Northern Territory) Territory Pearls |
|---|---|---|
| Jenner 2', 18', 60' | Report |

Stadium:
Queensland State Hockey Centre, Brisbane

22 May 2010

| WA Diamonds (Western Australia) | 5–1 | (Tasmania) Tassie Van Demons |
|---|---|---|
| S. Nelson 14', 32'; A. Nelson 19', 60'; Liddelow 59' | Report | McLeod 25' |

Stadium:
Perth Hockey Stadium, Perth

23 May 2010

| QLD Scorchers (Queensland) | 2–1 | (New South Wales) NSW Arrows |
|---|---|---|
| Hudson 6'; Paterson 50' | Report | Close 4' |

Stadium:
Queensland State Hockey Centre, Brisbane

23 May 2010

| Canberra Strikers (Australian Capital Territory) | 3–0 | (Northern Territory) Territory Pearls |
|---|---|---|
| Evans 3'; Stewart 14'; Allen 62' | Report |

Stadium:
Queensland State Hockey Centre, Brisbane

23 May 2010

| Southern Suns (South Australia) | 4–1 | (Tasmania) Tassie Van Demons |
|---|---|---|
| Parker 37'; Cibich 38'; Cass 47', 51' | Report | Khoury 5' |

Stadium:
Perth Hockey Stadium, Perth

23 May 2010

| VIC Vipers (Victoria (state)) | 1–1 | (Western Australia) WA Diamonds |
|---|---|---|
| Nanscawen 12' | Report | S. Nelson 40' |

Stadium:
Perth Hockey Stadium, Perth

29 May 2010

| QLD Scorchers (Queensland) | 4–0 | (Tasmania) Tassie Van Demons |
|---|---|---|
| Korner 37', 55'; Blyth 65'; Schulz 68' | Report |

Stadium:
State Hockey Centre, Adelaide

29 May 2010

| WA Diamonds (Western Australia) | 4–1 | (Australian Capital Territory) Canberra Strikers |
|---|---|---|
| Boyce 10'; Liddelow 49', 52'; Ciallella 53' | Report | Arrold 67' |

Stadium:
State Hockey Centre, Adelaide

29 May 2010

| Southern Suns (South Australia) | 2–2 | (New South Wales) NSW Arrows |
|---|---|---|
| Eshuis 46', 56' | Report | Hurtz 51'; Hollywood 66' |

Stadium:
State Hockey Centre, Adelaide

29 May 2010

| VIC Vipers (Victoria (state)) | 4–1 | (Northern Territory) Territory Pearls |
|---|---|---|
| Pearce 10'; Berriman 13'; Riordan 34'; Doutre 54' | Report | Blaum 41' |

Stadium:
State Hockey Centre, Adelaide

30 May 2010

| Southern Suns (South Australia) | 4–2 | (Australian Capital Territory) Canberra Strikers |
|---|---|---|
| Eshuis 26', 52'; Evans 47'; Parker 54' | Report | Taylor 34'; Allen 38' |

Stadium:
State Hockey Centre, Adelaide

30 May 2010

| VIC Vipers (Victoria (state)) | 3–0 | (Queensland) QLD Scorchers |
|---|---|---|
| Berriman 45'; Nanscawen 53'; Chau 64' | Report |

Stadium:
State Hockey Centre, Adelaide

30 May 2010

| WA Diamonds (Western Australia) | 3–1 | (New South Wales) NSW Arrows |
|---|---|---|
| A. Nelson 4', 15'; Boyce 46' | Report | Netzler 56' |

Stadium:
State Hockey Centre, Adelaide

30 May 2010

| Tassie Van Demons (Tasmania) | 0–0 | (Northern Territory) Territory Pearls |
|---|---|---|
| | Report |

Stadium:
State Hockey Centre, Adelaide

=== Classification round ===
==== Pool A ====
| Pos | Team | Pld | W | D | L | GF | GA | GD | Pts |
|---|---|---|---|---|---|---|---|---|---|
| 1 | (Western Australia) WA Diamonds | 10 | 6 | 3 | 1 | 28 | 7 | +21 | 42 |
| 2 | (Victoria (state)) VIC Vipers | 10 | 5 | 3 | 2 | 19 | 12 | +7 | 36 |
| 3 | (Australian Capital Territory) Canberra Strikers | 10 | 4 | 2 | 4 | 16 | 15 | +1 | 30 |
| 4 | (Northern Territory) Territory Pearls | 10 | 0 | 1 | 9 | 3 | 27 | −24 | 4 |

Source: Hockey Australia

1 June 2010

| WA Diamonds (Western Australia) | 5–0 | (Northern Territory) Territory Pearls |
|---|---|---|
| A. Nelson 8', 8'; Ciallella 9', 40'; Liddelow 59' | Report |

Stadium:
State Hockey Centre, Adelaide

1 June 2010

| VIC Vipers (Victoria (state)) | 1–1 | (Australian Capital Territory) Canberra Strikers |
|---|---|---|
| Riordan 41' | Report | Arrold 38' |

Stadium:
State Hockey Centre, Adelaide

2 June 2010

| WA Diamonds (Western Australia) | 0–0 | (Australian Capital Territory) Canberra Strikers |
|---|---|---|
| | Report |

Stadium:
State Hockey Centre, Adelaide

2 June 2010

| VIC Vipers (Victoria (state)) | 3–0 | (Northern Territory) Territory Pearls |
|---|---|---|
| Schubach 25'; Chau 42'; Messent 44' | Report |

Stadium:
State Hockey Centre, Adelaide

3 June 2010

| WA Diamonds (Western Australia) | 0–1 | (Victoria (state)) VIC Vipers |
|---|---|---|
| | Report | Messent 16' |

Stadium:
State Hockey Centre, Adelaide

3 June 2010

| Canberra Strikers (Australian Capital Territory) | 3–0 | (Northern Territory) Territory Pearls |
|---|---|---|
| Desmet 34'; Evans 66'; Bailey-Price 69' | Report |

Stadium:
State Hockey Centre, Adelaide

==== Pool B ====
| Pos | Team | Pld | W | D | L | GF | GA | GD | Pts |
|---|---|---|---|---|---|---|---|---|---|
| 1 | (Queensland) QLD Scorchers | 10 | 7 | 1 | 2 | 30 | 13 | +17 | 44 |
| 2 | (New South Wales) NSW Arrows | 10 | 7 | 1 | 2 | 29 | 13 | +16 | 47 |
| 3 | (South Australia) Southern Suns | 10 | 4 | 1 | 5 | 21 | 28 | −7 | 31 |
| 4 | (Tasmania) Tassie Van Demons | 10 | 0 | 2 | 8 | 7 | 32 | −25 | 9 |

Source: Hockey Australia

1 June 2010

| QLD Scorchers (Queensland) | 4–0 | (Tasmania) Tassie Van Demons |
|---|---|---|
| Schulz 29'; Attard 34', 54'; Blyth 50' | Report |

Stadium:
State Hockey Centre, Adelaide

1 June 2010

| NSW Arrows (New South Wales) | 3–1 | (South Australia) Southern Suns |
|---|---|---|
| Hurtz 32'; Rivers 42', 44' | Report | Eshuis 14' |

Stadium:
State Hockey Centre, Adelaide

2 June 2010

| QLD Scorchers (Queensland) | 4–0 | (South Australia) Southern Suns |
|---|---|---|
| Blyth 18', 63'; J. Dwyer 50'; Attard 52' | Report |

Stadium:
State Hockey Centre, Adelaide

2 June 2010

| NSW Arrows (New South Wales) | 3–0 | (Tasmania) Tassie Van Demons |
|---|---|---|
| Eastham 14'; Close 25'; Netzler 51' | Report |

Stadium:
State Hockey Centre, Adelaide

3 June 2010

| QLD Scorchers (Queensland) | 1–3 | (New South Wales) NSW Arrows |
|---|---|---|
| Schulz 22' | Report | Close 14'; Rivers 40', 45' |

Stadium:
State Hockey Centre, Adelaide

3 June 2010

| Southern Suns (South Australia) | 4–3 | (Tasmania) Tassie Van Demons |
|---|---|---|
| Parker 4', 50', 59'; Cass 70' | Report | Geeves 41'; Parker 55'; McLeod 56' |

Stadium:
State Hockey Centre, Adelaide

=== Classification matches ===
==== Seventh and eighth place ====
5 June 2010

| Tassie Van Demons (Tasmania) | 3–0 | (Northern Territory) Territory Pearls |
|---|---|---|
| Geeves 21'; Parker 59'; Khoury 69' | Report |

Stadium:
State Hockey Centre, Adelaide

==== Fifth and sixth place ====
5 June 2010

| Canberra Strikers (Australian Capital Territory) | 1–1 | (South Australia) Southern Suns |
|---|---|---|
| Allen 57' | Report | Reynolds 39' |
Penalties
| | 2–4 |

Stadium:
State Hockey Centre, Adelaide

==== Third and fourth place ====
5 June 2010

| VIC Vipers (Victoria (state)) | 0–1 | (New South Wales) NSW Arrows |
|---|---|---|
| | Report | Jenner 70' |

Stadium:
State Hockey Centre, Adelaide

==== Final ====
5 June 2010

| WA Diamonds (Western Australia) | 3–1 | (Queensland) QLD Scorchers |
|---|---|---|
| Eglington 33'; McGurk 56'; A. Nelson 64' | Report | Blyth 14' |

Stadium:
State Hockey Centre, Adelaide

== Awards ==
| Player of the Tournament | Top Goalscorer | Player of the Final |
|---|---|---|
| (Queensland) Madonna Blyth | (Western Australia) Ashleigh Nelson | (Western Australia) Ashleigh Nelson |

== Statistics ==
=== Final standings ===
| Pos | Team | Pld | W | D | L | GF | GA | GD | Pts | Qualification |
|---|---|---|---|---|---|---|---|---|---|---|
| 1st place, gold medalist(s) | (Western Australia) WA Diamonds | 11 | 7 | 3 | 1 | 31 | 8 | +23 | 24 | Gold Medal |
| 2nd place, silver medalist(s) | (Queensland) QLD Scorchers | 11 | 7 | 1 | 3 | 31 | 16 | +15 | 22 | Silver Medal |
| 3rd place, bronze medalist(s) | (New South Wales) NSW Arrows | 11 | 8 | 1 | 2 | 30 | 13 | +17 | 25 | Bronze Medal |
| 4 | (Victoria (state)) VIC Vipers | 11 | 5 | 3 | 3 | 19 | 13 | +6 | 18 | |
| 5 | (South Australia) Southern Suns | 11 | 4 | 2 | 5 | 22 | 29 | −7 | 14 | |
| 6 | (Australian Capital Territory) Canberra Strikers | 11 | 4 | 3 | 4 | 17 | 16 | +1 | 15 | |
| 7 | (Tasmania) Tassie Van Demons | 11 | 1 | 2 | 8 | 10 | 32 | −22 | 5 | |
| 8 | (Northern Territory) Territory Pearls | 11 | 0 | 1 | 10 | 3 | 36 | −33 | 1 | |

Source: Hockey Australia

=== Goalscorers ===
There were 163 goals scored in 44 matches, for an average of 3.7 goals per match.

9 goals

- (Western Australia) Ashleigh Nelson

8 goals

- (New South Wales) Emily Hurtz

7 goals

- (Queensland) Madonna Blyth
- (Western Australia) Sian Nelson

6 goals

- (New South Wales) Kate Jenner
- (South Australia) Georgina Parker

5 goals

- (New South Wales) Megan Rivers
- (Queensland) Amy Korner
- (South Australia) Clarissa Eshuis

4 goals

- (New South Wales) Jade Close
- (Queensland) Teneal Attard
- (Queensland) Jodie Schulz
- (Victoria (state)) Stephanie Riordan
- (Western Australia) Chantelle Ciallella
- (Western Australia) Shelly Liddelow

3 goals

- (Australian Capital Territory) Renee Allen
- (Australian Capital Territory) Nicole Arrold
- (Queensland) Jill Dwyer
- (South Australia) Sherrilyn Cass
- (Tasmania) Nina Khoury
- (Tasmania) Sofie McLeod
- (Western Australia) Fiona Boyce

2 goals

- (Australian Capital Territory) Catriona Bailey-Price
- (Australian Capital Territory) Naomi Evans
- (Australian Capital Territory) Anna Flanagan
- (New South Wales) Bianca Netzler
- (Queensland) Tegan Holcroft
- (Queensland) Marnie Hudson
- (South Australia) Jessica Cibich
- (South Australia) Holly Evans
- (South Australia) Tess Reynolds
- (Tasmania) Nicole Geeves
- (Tasmania) Emily Parker
- (Victoria (state)) Megan Berriman
- (Victoria (state)) Kary Chau
- (Victoria (state)) Claire Messent
- (Victoria (state)) Georgia Nanscawen
- (Victoria (state)) Danielle Schubach
- (Western Australia) Lisa Eglington

1 goal

- (Australian Capital Territory) Laura Desmet
- (Australian Capital Territory) Samantha Ellis
- (Australian Capital Territory) Toni Stewart
- (Australian Capital Territory) Emma Taylor
- (Australian Capital Territory) Nicole Youman
- (New South Wales) Emma Cobbin
- (New South Wales) Casey Eastham
- (New South Wales) Kate Hollywood
- (New South Wales) Yasmine Phillips
- (New South Wales) Hollie Webster
- (Northern Territory) Caroline Blaum
- (Northern Territory) Heather Langham
- (Northern Territory) Emily Peris
- (Queensland) Prue Eiser
- (Queensland) Jordyn Holzberger
- (Queensland) Kirstin Johnson
- (Queensland) Emma Paterson
- (South Australia) Bianca Greenshields
- (South Australia) Karri McMahon
- (Victoria (state)) Anna Burns
- (Victoria (state)) Stephanie Doutre
- (Victoria (state)) Leah Merrett
- (Victoria (state)) Sarah O'Connor
- (Victoria (state)) Emma Pearce
- (Western Australia) Kobie McGurk
- (Western Australia) Jayde Taylor
