= 2014 Women's Hockey World Cup squads =

This article lists the confirmed squads for the 2014 Women's Hockey World Cup tournament to be held in The Hague, Netherlands between 31 May and 15 June 2014.

Players' Age as of 30 May 2014.

== Pool A ==
=== Australia ===
On 30 April 2014 Commens named his final squad.

Head coach: Adam Commens

| No. | Player | Pos. | Age |
|---|---|---|---|
| 2 | Georgia Nanscawen | | 22 |
| 4 | Casey Eastham | | 25 |
| 5 | Ashlee Wells | GK | 24 |
| 6 | Kirstin Dwyer | | 25 |
| 7 | Jodie Kenny | | 26 |
| 8 | Ashleigh Nelson | | 27 |
| 9 | Anna Flanagan | | 22 |
| 11 | Karri McMahon | | 22 |
| 12 | Madonna Blyth (c) | | 28 |

| No. | Player | Pos. | Age |
|---|---|---|---|
| 13 | Edwina Bone | | 26 |
| 16 | Kellie White | | 22 |
| 17 | Emily Hurtz | | 24 |
| 18 | Jane Claxton | | 21 |
| 19 | Georgie Parker | | 25 |
| 21 | Jayde Taylor | | 29 |
| 22 | Kate Jenner | | 24 |
| 26 | Emily Smith | | 21 |
| 27 | Rachael Lynch | GK | 27 |

=== Belgium ===
Belgian squad was announced on 21 May 2014.

Head coach: Pascal Kina

| No. | Player | Pos. | Age |
|---|---|---|---|
| 2 | Anne-Sophie De Scheemaekere | | 28 |
| 3 | Louise Cavenaile | | 25 |
| 4 | Aline Fobe | | 21 |
| 5 | Stephanie De Groof | | 23 |
| 6 | Anouk Raes | | 25 |
| 8 | Emma Puvrez | | 16 |
| 9 | Lieselotte Van Lindt | | 25 |
| 13 | Alix Gerniers | | 20 |
| 14 | Emilie Sinia | | 29 |

| No. | Player | Pos. | Age |
|---|---|---|---|
| 15 | Charlotte De Vos (c) | | 30 |
| 16 | Louise Versavel | | 19 |
| 18 | Maureen Beernaert | | 20 |
| 19 | Barbara Nelen | | 22 |
| 21 | Aisling D'Hooghe | GK | 19 |
| 22 | Stephanie Vanden Borre | | 16 |
| 23 | Elena Sotgiu | GK | 18 |
| 24 | Manon Simons | | 18 |
| 27 | Jill Boon | | 27 |

=== Japan ===
Head coach: Yoo Seung-jin

| No. | Player | Pos. | Age |
|---|---|---|---|
| 1 | Ryoko Oie | GK | 25 |
| 2 | Shiho Sakai | | 24 |
| 3 | Keiko Manabe | | 27 |
| 4 | Kana Nomura | | 24 |
| 5 | Miyuki Nakagawa (c) | | 27 |
| 6 | Akiko Ota | | 27 |
| 7 | Shiho Otsuka | | 24 |
| 8 | Mayumi Ono | | 29 |
| 9 | Shihori Oikawa | | 25 |

| No. | Player | Pos. | Age |
|---|---|---|---|
| 10 | Mazuki Arai | | 25 |
| 11 | Akane Shibata | | 26 |
| 15 | Ayaka Nishimura | | 25 |
| 16 | Yuri Nagai | | 22 |
| 17 | Hazuki Nagai | | 19 |
| 18 | Yuka Yoshikawa | GK | 30 |
| 20 | Yoshino Kasahara | | 23 |
| 22 | Hazuki Yuda | | 24 |
| 23 | Shoko Kanefuji | | 22 |

=== Netherlands ===
On 8 May 2014 Caldas announced his squad.

Head coach: Maximiliano Caldas

| No. | Player | Pos. | Age |
|---|---|---|---|
| 1 | Joyce Sombroek | GK | 23 |
| 2 | Frederique Derkx | | 20 |
| 3 | Xan de Waard | | 18 |
| 7 | Willemijn Bos | | 26 |
| 8 | Marloes Keetels | | 21 |
| 9 | Carlien Dirkse van den Heuvel | | 27 |
| 10 | Kelly Jonker | | 24 |
| 12 | Lidewij Welten | | 23 |
| 13 | Caia van Maasakker | | 25 |

| No. | Player | Pos. | Age |
|---|---|---|---|
| 17 | Maartje Paumen (c) | | 28 |
| 18 | Naomi van As | | 30 |
| 19 | Ellen Hoog | | 28 |
| 22 | Larissa Meijer | GK | 23 |
| 23 | Kim Lammers | | 33 |
| 24 | Eva de Goede | | 25 |
| 26 | Roos Drost | | 23 |
| 29 | Jacky Schoenaker | | 25 |
| 30 | Margot van Geffen | | 24 |

=== New Zealand ===
New Zealand squad was named by head coach Mark Hager on 20 May.

Head coach: Mark Hager

| No. | Player | Pos. | Age |
|---|---|---|---|
| 1 | Kayla Whitelock (c) | | 28 |
| 2 | Emily Naylor | | 28 |
| 3 | Krystal Forgesson | | 31 |
| 4 | Olivia Merry | | 22 |
| 5 | Katie Glynn | | 25 |
| 6 | Petrea Webster | | 26 |
| 8 | Sally Rutherford | GK | 32 |
| 13 | Sam Charlton | | 22 |
| 14 | Michaela Curtis | | 20 |

| No. | Player | Pos. | Age |
|---|---|---|---|
| 16 | Liz Thompson | | 19 |
| 17 | Sophie Cocks | | 19 |
| 19 | Rhiannon Dennison | | 21 |
| 22 | Gemma Flynn | | 24 |
| 24 | Rose Keddell | | 20 |
| 27 | Jordan Grant | | 23 |
| 30 | Bianca Russell | GK | 35 |
| 31 | Stacey Michelsen | | 23 |
| 32 | Anita Punt | | 26 |

=== South Korea ===
Head coach: Han Jin-soo

| No. | Player | Pos. | Age |
|---|---|---|---|
| 1 | Lee Sin-hye | GK | 27 |
| 3 | Kim Hyun-ji | | 20 |
| 4 | Kim Young-ran | | 28 |
| 5 | Heo Jae-seong | | 22 |
| 7 | Cha Se-na | | 28 |
| 8 | An Hyo-ju | | 26 |
| 9 | Han Hye-lyoung | | 28 |
| 10 | Park Mi-hyun | | 28 |
| 11 | Kim Jong-eun (c) | | 28 |

| No. | Player | Pos. | Age |
|---|---|---|---|
| 12 | Kim Da-rae | | 27 |
| 13 | Cheon Seul-ki | | 25 |
| 15 | Cho Eun-ji | | 24 |
| 17 | Kim Ok-ju | | 26 |
| 19 | Oh Sun-soon | | 27 |
| 20 | Park Ki-ju | | 24 |
| 22 | Jang Soo-ji | GK | 26 |
| 23 | Lee Young-sil | | 27 |
| 32 | Cheon Eun-bi | | 22 |

== Pool B ==
=== Argentina ===
The squad was announced on 16 April 2014.

Head coach: Carlos Retegui

| No. | Player | Pos. | Age |
|---|---|---|---|
| 1 | Belén Succi | GK | 28 |
| 2 | Mariana Rossi | | 35 |
| 4 | Rosario Luchetti | | 29 |
| 5 | Macarena Rodríguez | | 35 |
| 7 | Martina Cavallero | | 24 |
| 8 | Luciana Aymar (c) | | 36 |
| 11 | Carla Rebecchi | | 29 |
| 12 | Delfina Merino | | 24 |
| 16 | Florencia Habif | | 20 |

| No. | Player | Pos. | Age |
|---|---|---|---|
| 17 | Rocío Sánchez Moccia | | 25 |
| 18 | Daniela Sruoga | | 26 |
| 19 | Agustina Albertario | | 21 |
| 21 | Mariela Scarone | | 27 |
| 22 | Giselle Juárez | | 23 |
| 25 | Silvina D'Elía | | 28 |
| 27 | Noel Barrionuevo | | 30 |
| 30 | Josefina Sruoga | | 23 |
| 31 | Florencia Mutio | GK | 29 |

=== China ===
Head coach: You Baodong

| No. | Player | Pos. | Age |
|---|---|---|---|
| 2 | Wang Mengyu | | 22 |
| 7 | Cui Qiuxia (c) | | 23 |
| 8 | Wang Mengrong | | 22 |
| 9 | Xi Xiayun | | 21 |
| 12 | Wang Na | | 19 |
| 15 | Yan Yan | | 24 |
| 19 | Zhang Xiaoxue | | 21 |
| 20 | Sun Xiao | | 21 |
| 21 | Liu Pan | | 23 |

| No. | Player | Pos. | Age |
|---|---|---|---|
| 22 | Gu Bingfeng | | 20 |
| 23 | De Jiaojiao | | 24 |
| 25 | Xu Xiaoxu | | 27 |
| 26 | Jiang Ailin | | 21 |
| 27 | Huang Ting | | 25 |
| 28 | Liang Meiyu | | 20 |
| 29 | Peng Yang | | 22 |
| 30 | Li Dongxiao | GK | 26 |
| 32 | Guo Jiajia | GK | 19 |

=== England ===
England squad was named on 8 May.

Head coach: Jason Lee

| No. | Player | Pos. | Age |
|---|---|---|---|
| 1 | Maddie Hinch | GK | 25 |
| 2 | Kirsty MacKay | GK | 27 |
| 4 | Laura Unsworth | DF | 26 |
| 6 | Hannah Macleod | FW | 29 |
| 7 | Georgie Twigg | MF | 23 |
| 9 | Susannah Townsend | MF | 24 |
| 10 | Susie Gilbert | MF | 25 |
| 11 | Kate Richardson-Walsh (c) | DF | 34 |
| 13 | Sam Quek | DF | 25 |

| No. | Player | Pos. | Age |
|---|---|---|---|
| 15 | Alex Danson | FW | 29 |
| 19 | Sophie Bray | FW | 24 |
| 20 | Hollie Webb | DF | 23 |
| 21 | Ellie Watton | FW | 24 |
| 22 | Ashleigh Ball | MF | 28 |
| 23 | Sally Walton | DF | 32 |
| 26 | Lily Owsley | FW | 19 |
| 27 | Zoe Shipperley | DF | 24 |
| 28 | Nicola White | FW | 26 |

=== Germany ===
The squad was announced on 17 April 2014.

Head coach: Jamilon Mülders

| No. | Player | Pos. | Age |
|---|---|---|---|
| 2 | Tina Bachmann | | 35 |
| 3 | Kim Platten (c) | GK | 25 |
| 4 | Jana Teschke | | 23 |
| 5 | Anne Schröder | | 19 |
| 9 | Kristina Hillmann | | 22 |
| 10 | Nina Hasselmann | | 28 |
| 11 | Eileen Hoffmann | | 29 |
| 12 | Lydia Haase | | 27 |
| 13 | Katharina Otte | | 27 |

| No. | Player | Pos. | Age |
|---|---|---|---|
| 15 | Hannah Krüger | | 25 |
| 17 | Barbara Vogel | GK | 33 |
| 18 | Lisa Altenburg | | 24 |
| 23 | Marie Mävers | | 24 |
| 24 | Maike Stöckel | | 30 |
| 26 | Hannah Gablać | | 19 |
| 27 | Anissa Korth | | 21 |
| 28 | Julia Müller | | 28 |
| 30 | Lena Jacobi | | 28 |

=== South Africa ===
Bonnet named his squad on 6 May.

Head coach: Giles Bonnet

| No. | Player | Pos. | Age |
|---|---|---|---|
| 2 | Vuyisanani Mangisa | GK | 26 |
| 3 | Celia Evans | | 23 |
| 7 | Illse Davids | | 27 |
| 8 | Marsha Cox (c) | | 31 |
| 10 | Shelley Russell | | 26 |
| 11 | Marcelle Manson | | 29 |
| 12 | Dirkie Chamberlain | | 27 |
| 13 | Lisa-Marie Deetlefs | | 26 |
| 14 | Kelly Madsen | | 24 |

| No. | Player | Pos. | Age |
|---|---|---|---|
| 15 | Pietie Coetzee | | 35 |
| 18 | Anelle van Deventer | GK | 20 |
| 19 | Lilian du Plessis | | 21 |
| 20 | Nicolene Terblanche | | 26 |
| 22 | Kathleen Taylor | | 29 |
| 23 | Bernadette Coston | | 24 |
| 28 | Quanita Bobbs | | 20 |
| 29 | Tarryn Bright | | 31 |
| 30 | Sulette Damons | | 24 |

=== United States ===
On 19 May head coach Parnham announced his final squad selection.

Head coach: Craig Parnham

| No. | Player | Pos. | Age |
|---|---|---|---|
| 2 | Stefanie Fee | | 24 |
| 5 | Melissa Gonzalez | | 25 |
| 6 | Alesha Widdall | GK | 24 |
| 7 | Kelsey Kolojejchick | | 22 |
| 8 | Rachel Dawson | | 28 |
| 9 | Michelle Vittese | | 24 |
| 10 | Jill Witmer | | 22 |
| 12 | Julia Reinprecht | | 22 |
| 13 | Emily Wold | | 19 |

| No. | Player | Pos. | Age |
|---|---|---|---|
| 14 | Katie Reinprecht | | 24 |
| 16 | Katie O'Donnell | | 25 |
| 18 | Michelle Kasold | | 27 |
| 19 | Caroline Nichols | | 29 |
| 21 | Paige Selenski | | 23 |
| 23 | Katelyn Falgowski | | 25 |
| 24 | Kathleen Sharkey | | 24 |
| 27 | Lauren Crandall (c) | | 29 |
| 31 | Jackie Kintzer | GK | 26 |
