= Gohdes =

Gohdes is a surname. Notable people with the surname include:

- Jill Gohdes (née Dwyer) (born 1990), Australian field hockey player
- Matt Gohdes (born 1990), Australian field hockey player
