= Field hockey at the 2009 Australian Youth Olympic Festival – Women's tournament =

Women's field hockey at the 2009 AYOF

Tournament details
- Host country: Australia
- City: Sydney
- Dates: 14 – 18 January
- Teams: 4
- Venue(s): Sydney Olympic Park

Final positions
- Champions: Great Britain (2nd title)
- Runner-up: Australia
- Third place: India

Tournament statistics
- Matches played: 8
- Goals scored: 33 (4.13 per match)
- Top scorer(s): (Australia) Heather Langham (United Kingdom) Sophie Bray (United Kingdom) Jenny Hall (3 goals)

The Women's field hockey at the 2009 Australian Youth Olympic Festival was the second edition of the field hockey tournament for women at the AYOF.

Great Britain won the tournament for the second time by defeating Australia 3–2 in the final. In the third-place playoff, India won the bronze medal by defeating the United States 2–0.

== Competition format ==
The tournament featured the national under–21 teams of Great Britain, India, Malaysia, and the hosts, Australia, competing in a round-robin format, with each team playing the other once. Three points were awarded for a win, one for a draw, and none for a loss.

At the conclusion of the pool stage, the top two teams contested the final, while the bottom two teams played off for third place.

== Teams ==
The following four teams competed for the title:

- Australia
- Great Britain
- India
- United States

== Officials ==
The following umpires were appointed by the International Hockey Federation to officiate the tournament:

- Leah Ashford (AUS)
- Lynn Norhana Hassan (SGP)
- Stephanie Judefind (USA)
- Anupama Puchimanda (IND)
- Hannah Sanders (GBR)

== Results ==
=== Preliminary round ===
==== Pool ====
Pos	Team	Pld	W	D	L	GF	GA	GD	Pts	Qualification
1	Australia	3	3	0	0	11	4	+7	9	Final
2	Great Britain	3	2	0	1	9	6	+3	6	Final
3	India	3	1	0	2	5	6	−1	3	Third and fourth
4	United States	3	0	0	3	1	10	−9	0	Third and fourth

Source: AYOF
Rules for classification: 1) Points; 2) Goal difference; 3) Goals scored; 4) Games won; 5) Head-to-head.

==== Fixtures ====
14 January 2009
09:00

Australia	4–0	United States
Langham 3'; Dwyer 29'; Hudson 51'; Hurtz 60'	Report

Umpires:
Anupama Puchimanda (IND)
Lynn Norhana Hassan (SGP)

14 January 2009
11:00

Great Britain	3–1	India
Newton 41', 60'; Bray 70'	Report	Katariya 14'

Umpires:
Leah Ashford (AUS)
Stephanie Judefind (USA)

15 January 2009
14:00

Great Britain	4–1	United States
Bray 23'; Hall 33', 62'; White 39'	Report	Drazdowski 48'

Umpires:
Lynn Norhana Hassan (SGP)
Leah Ashford (AUS)

15 January 2009
18:00

India	2–3	Australia
Xess 48', 57'	Report	Lucas 35'; Parker 40'; Hudson 47'

Umpires:
Hannah Sanders (GBR)
Stephanie Judefind (USA)

17 January 2009
11:00

Australia	4–2	Great Britain
Andrews 25'; Buckley 33'; Langham 51', 63'	Report	Hall 9'; Twigg 34'

Umpires:
Stephanie Judefind (USA)
Anupama Puchimanda (IND)

17 January 2009
13:00

United States	0–2	India
	Report	Thokchom 56'; Ritu 69'

Umpires:
Hannah Sanders (GBR)
Lynn Norhana Hassan (SGP)

=== Classification round ===
==== Third and fourth place ====
18 January 2009
08:00

India	2–0	United States
Rani 62'; Ritu 68'	Report

Umpires:
Hannah Sanders (GBR)
Leah Ashford (AUS)

==== Final ====
18 January 2009
10:30

Australia	2–3 (a.e.t.)	Great Britain
Andrews 27'; Hurtz 68'	Report	Page 68'; Pearce 70'; Bray 77'

Umpires:
Lynn Norhana Hassan (SGP)
Anupama Puchimanda (IND)

== Statistics ==
=== Final standings ===
As per statistical convention in field hockey, matches decided in extra time are counted as wins and losses, while matches decided by penalty shoot-outs are counted as draws.

Pos	Team	Pld	W	D	L	GF	GA	GD	Pts	Final result
1st place, gold medalist(s)	Great Britain	4	3	0	1	12	8	+4	9	Gold Medal
2nd place, silver medalist(s)	Australia	4	3	0	1	13	7	+6	9	Silver Medal
3rd place, bronze medalist(s)	India	4	2	0	2	7	6	+1	6	Bronze Medal
4	United States	4	0	0	4	1	12	−11	0	Fourth place

Source: AYOF

=== Goalscorers ===
There were 33 goals scored in 8 matches, for an average of 4.12 goals per match.

3 goals

- (Australia) Heather Langham
- (United Kingdom) Sophie Bray
- (United Kingdom) Jennifer Hall

2 goals

- (Australia) Stephanie Andrews
- (Australia) Marnie Hudson
- (Australia) Emily Hurtz
- (United Kingdom) Philippa Newton
- (India) Ritu Rani
- (India) Binita Xess

1 goal

- (Australia) Jemma Buckley
- (Australia) Jill Dwyer
- (Australia) Karina Lucas
- (Australia) Georgina Parker
- (United Kingdom) Sarah Page
- (United Kingdom) Harriet Pearce
- (United Kingdom) Georgina Twigg
- (United Kingdom) Nicola White
- (India) Vandana Katariya
- (India) Rani Rampal
- (India) Anuradha Thokchom
- (United States) Elizabeth Drazdowski

Source: AYOF
