= 2009 Women's Hockey Junior World Cup =

International field hockey competition

Tournament details
- Host country: United States
- City: Boston
- Teams: 16 (from 5 confederations)
- Venue(s): Jordan Field, Harvard University; Newton Campus Field, Boston College

Final positions
- Champions: Netherlands (2nd title)
- Runner-up: Argentina
- Third place: South Korea

Tournament statistics
- Matches played: 58
- Goals scored: 255 (4.4 per match)
- Top scorer: (China) Zhao Yudiao (12 goals)
- Best player: (Netherlands) Emilie Mol

The 2009 Women's Hockey Junior World Cup was the sixth tournament of the Women's Hockey Junior World Cup. It was held from August 3 to August 16, 2009, in Boston, United States.

The Netherlands won the tournament for the second time after defeating Argentina 3–0 in the final. Defending champions South Korea won the third-place match by defeating England 2–1.

== Qualification ==
Each continental federation got a number of quotas depending on the FIH World Rankings for teams qualified through their junior continental championships. Along with the host nation, 16 teams competed in the tournament.

Dates	Event	Location	Qualifier(s)
Host nation			United States
11–20 July 2008	2008 Junior Africa Cup for Nations	Cairo, Egypt	South Africa
20–26 July 2008	2008 EuroHockey Junior Nations Championship	Valencia, Spain	Germany; Netherlands; England; Belarus; Spain; Lithuania
20–26 July 2008	2008 EuroHockey Junior Nations Trophy	Prague, Czech Republic	France^{1}
6–12 October 2008	2008 Pan American Junior Championship	Mexico City, Mexico	Chile; Argentina
11–14 December 2008	2008 Oceania Junior Nations Cup	Brisbane, Australia	Australia^{2} New Zealand^{2}
13–21 December 2008	2008 Junior Asia Cup	Seremban, Malaysia	South Korea; China; India

^1 – Egypt withdrew from participating. As the first reserve team was previously assigned to the European Federation, France took their place as winners of the 2012 EuroHockey Junior Nations Trophy.
^2 – Australia and New Zealand qualified automatically due to the lack of other competing teams in the Oceania qualifier.

== Results ==
All times are Eastern Daylight Time (UTC−04:00)

=== Preliminary round ===
==== Pool A ====
Pos	Team	Pld	W	D	L	GF	GA	GD	Pts	Qualification
1	South Korea	3	2	1	0	12	4	+8	7	Advance to Medal Round
2	England	3	2	1	0	9	2	+7	7	Advance to Medal Round
3	Chile	3	1	0	2	3	8	−5	3	Advance to Medal Round
4	France	3	0	0	3	1	11	−10	0	

Source: FIH
Rules for classification: 1) points; 2) goal difference; 3) goals scored; 4) head-to-head result.

3 August 2009
10:30

Chile	1–6	South Korea
Caram 60'	Report	Yoo 13', 24'; Kim A. 16'; Lee S. 52'; Hong 54'; Cheon S. 55'

Umpires:
Keely Dunn (CAN)
Amy Hassick (USA)

3 August 2009
12:45

England	5–0	France
Turner 10'; Coakley 40', 54'; Bray 50', 63'	Report

Umpires:
Maritza Perez Castro (URU)
Irene Presenqui (ARG)

4 August 2009
12:30

South Korea	2–2	England
Bae 20'; Cheon S. 69'	Report	Craddock 1'; Newton 33'

Umpires:
Chen Hong (CHN)
Caroline Brunekreef (NED)

4 August 2009
14:45

France	0–2	Chile
	Report	Sclabos 6'; Greene 55'

Umpires:
Michelle Joubert (RSA)
Emma Simmons (BER)

6 August 2009
09:00

South Korea	4–1	France
Yoo 8'; Lee S. 32'; Cheon S. 50'; Hong 69'	Report	Preney 4'

Umpires:
Keely Dunn (CAN)
Belen Gonzalez (ESP)

6 August 2009
11:00

England	2–0	Chile
Turner 27'; Harper 66'	Report

Umpires:
Amy Hassick (USA)
Kang Hyun-Young (KOR)

==== Pool B ====
Pos	Team	Pld	W	D	L	GF	GA	GD	Pts	Qualification
1	Germany	3	3	0	0	11	4	+7	9	Advance to Medal Round
2	Argentina	3	2	0	1	10	2	+8	6	Advance to Medal Round
3	South Africa	3	1	0	2	5	11	−6	3	Advance to Medal Round
4	Lithuania	3	0	0	3	3	12	−9	0	

Source: FIH
Rules for classification: 1) points; 2) goal difference; 3) goals scored; 4) head-to-head result.

3 August 2009
09:00

Argentina	1–2	Germany
Merino 68'	Report	Hahn 50'; Wilde 59'

Umpires:
Nor Piza Hassan (MAS)
Frances Block (ENG)

3 August 2009
11:00

South Africa	3–2	Lithuania
McNulty 10'; Terblanche 63'; Manuel 69'	Report	Malyseva 7'; Juodyte 40'

Umpires:
Julie Beamish (IRL)
Petra Muller (GER)

5 August 2009
10:15

Lithuania	0–4	Argentina
	Report	Zuloaga 35'; González Candia 49'; Merino 51'; Lozzia 70'

Umpires:
Keely Dunn (CAN)
Belen Gonzalez (ESP)

5 August 2009
12:30

Germany	4–2	South Africa
Grambusch 18'; Pehle 35'; Frank 36', 43'	Report	Pearton 20'; Kemp 46'

Umpires:
Irene Clelland (SCO)
Maritza Perez Castro (URU)

6 August 2009
12:45

Germany	5–1	Lithuania
Grambusch 10'; Frank 15', 17'; Pehle 47'; Teschke 51'	Report	Bardauskaite 64'

Umpires:
Miskarmalia Mhd Ariffin (SIN)
Chen Hong (CHN)

6 August 2009
13:00

South Africa	0–5	Argentina
	Report	Sánchez Moccia 5'; Román 19'; Rojas 50'; Merino 56'; Dupuy 68'

Umpires:
Petra Muller (GER)
Caroline Brunekreef (NED)

==== Pool C ====
Pos	Team	Pld	W	D	L	GF	GA	GD	Pts	Qualification
1	China	3	2	0	1	7	2	+5	6	Advance to Medal Round
2	Netherlands	3	2	0	1	8	4	+4	6	Advance to Medal Round
3	New Zealand	3	2	0	1	7	4	+3	6	Advance to Medal Round
4	Spain	3	0	0	3	0	12	−12	0	

Source: FIH
Rules for classification: 1) points; 2) goal difference; 3) goals scored; 4) head-to-head result.

3 August 2009
13:00

New Zealand	3–1	Netherlands
Finlayson 29'; Glynn 47', 53'	Report	Van Male 19'

Umpires:
Irene Clelland (SCO)
Cecilia Valenzuela (CHI)

3 August 2009
15:00

China	3–0	Spain
Zhao 27', 39'; Sun S. 69'	Report

Umpires:
Michelle Joubert (RSA)
Miskarmalia Mhd. Ariffin (SIN)

5 August 2009
14:45

Spain	0–4	New Zealand
	Report	Webster 18'; Glynn 60', 64'; Flynn 69'

Umpires:
Nor Piza Hassan (MAS)
Amy Hassick (USA)

5 August 2009
17:00

Netherlands	2–1	China
Groen 3'; Jonker 7'	Report	Sun S. 55'

Umpires:
Kang Hyun-Young (KOR)
Frances Block (ENG)

6 August 2009
15:00

Spain	0–5	Netherlands
	Report	Willemse 13'; Jonker 22'; Van Maasakker 37', 46'; Van der Pols 52'

Umpires:
Frances Block (ENG)
Kelly Hudson (NZL)

6 August 2009
17:00

China	3–0	New Zealand
Zhao 22', 50'; Sun Y. 59'	Report

Umpires:
Claire Adenot (FRA)
Irene Presenqui (ARG)

==== Pool D ====
Pos	Team	Pld	W	D	L	GF	GA	GD	Pts	Qualification
1	Australia	3	2	0	1	11	4	+7	6	Advance to Medal Round
2	India	3	2	0	1	11	6	+5	6	Advance to Medal Round
3	United States	3	2	0	1	8	5	+3	6	Advance to Medal Round
4	Belarus	3	0	0	3	1	16	−15	0	

Source: FIH
Rules for classification: 1) points; 2) goal difference; 3) goals scored; 4) head-to-head result.

3 August 2009
17:00

India	3–2	Australia
Poonam 45'; Monika 53'; Asem 70'	Report	Eastham 31'; Hudson 60'

Umpires:
Mariana Reydo (ARG)
Caroline Brunekreef (NED)

3 August 2009
19:00

United States	3–1	Belarus
O'Donnell 9', 12'; Gebhart 17'	Report	Shcharbakova 20'

Umpires:
Kang Hyun-Young (KOR)
Kelly Hudson (NZL)

4 August 2009
17:00

India	6–0	Belarus
Dung Dung 16'; Poonam 38'; Ritu 51'; Devi 53', 54', 58'	Report

Umpires:
Julie Beamish (IRL)
Belen Gonzalez (ESP)

4 August 2009
19:15

Australia	2–1	United States
Holcroft 17'; Hudson 36'	Report	Malmberg 44'

Umpires:
Miskarmalia Mhd Ariffin (SIN)
Irene Presenqui (ARG)

6 August 2009
10:30

Australia	7–0	Belarus
Holcroft 2'; Schubach 5'; Eastham 14', 31'; Denning 16'; Dwyer 32', 45'	Report

Umpires:
Cecilia Valenzuela (CHI)
Mariana Reydo (ARG)

6 August 2009
19:00

United States	4–2	India
Gebhardt 24'; González 31'; Vittese 38', 46'	Report	Devi 44'; Ritu 70'

Umpires:
Irene Clelland (SCO)
Michelle Joubert (RSA)

=== Medal round ===
==== Pool E ====
Pos	Team	Pld	W	D	L	GF	GA	GD	Pts	Qualification
1	England	5	3	2	0	9	5	+4	11	Semi-finals
2	South Korea	5	3	1	1	15	10	+5	10	Semi-finals
3	Australia	5	3	1	1	10	7	+3	10	
4	United States	5	2	0	3	12	9	+3	6	
5	India	5	2	0	3	10	11	−1	6	
6	Chile	5	0	0	5	2	16	−14	0	

Source: FIH
Rules for classification: 1) points; 2) goal difference; 3) goals scored; 4) head-to-head result.

8 August 2009
09:00

England	1–0	India
Sherer 7'	Report

Umpires:
Claire Adenot (FRA)
Michelle Joubert (RSA)

8 August 2009
15:00

Australia	1–0	Chile
Eastham 54'	Report

Umpires:
Miskarmalia Mhd Ariffin (SIN)
Mariana Reydo (ARG)

8 August 2009
19:00

South Korea	2–1	United States
Lee S. 53'; Bae 67'	Report	Reinprecht 7'

Umpires:
Irene Presenqui (ARG)
Nor Piza Hassan (MAS)

9 August 2009
14:30

India	3–1	Chile
Sunila Kiro 28', 62'; Dung Dung 68'	Report	Greene 15'

Umpires:
Caroline Brunekreef (NED)
Kang Hyun-Young (KOR)

9 August 2009
17:00

South Korea	2–4	Australia
Yoo 40'; Bae 67'	Report	Miller 7'; Holcroft 33'; Jenner 44', 47'

Umpires:
Irene Clelland (SCO)
Irene Presenqui (ARG)

9 August 2009
19:00

United States	2–3	England
Gandhi 23'; Reinprecht 48'	Report	Sherer 20'; Craddock 47'; Pearce 57'

Umpires:
Mariana Reydo (ARG)
Kelly Hudson (NZL)

11 August 2009
14:30

South Korea	3–2	India
Cheon S. 19', 24', 53'	Report	Devi 11'; Monika 29'

Umpires:
Keely Dunn (CAN)
Amy Hassick (USA)

11 August 2009
16:45

Australia	1–1	England
Schubach 27'	Report	Pearce 8'

Umpires:
Michelle Joubert (RSA)
Kang Hyun-Young (KOR)

11 August 2009
19:00

United States	4–0	Chile
Malmberg 26'; Falgowski 40'; González 44'; Drazdowski 62'	Report

Umpires:
Chen Hong (CHN)
Kelly Hudson (NZL)

==== Pool F ====
Pos	Team	Pld	W	D	L	GF	GA	GD	Pts	Qualification
1	Netherlands	5	4	0	1	13	5	+8	12	Semi-finals
2	Argentina	5	3	0	2	16	8	+8	9	Semi-finals
3	Germany	5	2	2	1	9	7	+2	8	
4	China	5	2	1	2	13	8	+5	7	
5	New Zealand	5	2	1	2	9	12	−3	7	
6	South Africa	5	0	0	5	4	24	−20	0	

Source: FIH
Rules for classification: 1) points; 2) goal difference; 3) goals scored; 4) head-to-head result.

8 August 2009
11:00

China	5–0	South Africa
Liao 15'; Sun S. 43', 67'; Zheng 62'; Zhang W. 63'	Report

Umpires:
Kang Hyun-Young (KOR)
Amy Hassick (USA)

8 August 2009
13:00

Germany	1–1	New Zealand
Grambusch 51'	Report	Glynn 5'

Umpires:
Frances Block (ENG)
Caroline Brunekreef (NED)

8 August 2009
17:00

Argentina	1–2	Netherlands
Merino 34'	Report	Van Maasakker 39'; Jonker 43'

Umpires:
Kelly Hudson (NZL)
Irene Clelland (SCO)

10 August 2009
14:30

Netherlands	7–0	South Africa
Groen 15'; Jonker 29', 41', 65'; Van Maasakker 48'; Willemse 51'; Mol 64'	Report

Umpires:
Miskarmalia Mhd Ariffin (SIN)
Nor Piza Hassan (MAS)

10 August 2009
16:45

New Zealand	2–5	Argentina
Glynn 30', 41'	Report	Zuloaga 5', 53'; Soracco 26'; Cavallero 32'; Merino 43'

Umpires:
Michelle Joubert (RSA)
Frances Block (ENG)

10 August 2009
19:00

Germany	2–2	China
Grambusch 5'; Frank 38'	Report	Zhao 59', 61'

Umpires:
Amy Hassick (USA)
Claire Adenot (FRA)

12 August 2009
14:30

New Zealand	3–2	South Africa
Flynn 44'; Blackwood 48'; Gunson 62'	Report	Terblanche 35'; Kemp 54'

Umpires:
Caroline Brunekreef (NED)
Mariana Reydo (ARG)

12 August 2009
16:45

Germany	0–1	Netherlands
	Report	Mol 12'

Umpires:
Irene Clelland (SCO)
Irene Presenqui (ARG)

12 August 2009
19:00

China	2–4	Argentina
Zhao 24'; Zhang W. 41'	Report	González Candia 13', 34' del Frari 44'; Cavallero 62'

Umpires:
Frances Block (ENG)
Claire Adenot (FRA)

=== Non-medal round ===
==== Pool G ====
Pos	Team	Pld	W	D	L	GF	GA	GD	Pts
1	Spain	3	3	0	0	14	3	+11	9
2	France	3	2	0	1	5	9	−4	6
3	Lithuania	3	1	0	2	7	10	−3	3
4	Belarus	3	0	0	3	6	10	−4	0

Source: FIH
Rules for classification: 1) points; 2) goal difference; 3) goals scored; 4) head-to-head result.

8 August 2009
10:30

Lithuania	4–3	Belarus
Kvilonaite 9', 63'; Malyseva 31', 48'	Report	Mikheichik 25', 53', 64'

Umpires:
Emma Simmons (BER)
Maritza Perez Castro (URU)

8 August 2009
12:45

Spain	6–0	France
Riera 30', 36', 50', 56'; Pérez 39', 64'	Report

Umpires:
Julie Beamish (IRL)
Keely Dunn (CAN)

9 August 2009
12:15

Belarus	2–3	France
Mikheichik 6'; Bahushevich 26'	Report	Munch 44'; Roger 57'; Richard 69'

Umpires:
Petra Muller (GER)
Belen Gonzalez (ESP)

10 August 2009
12:15

Spain	5–2	Lithuania
Puig 10'; Riera 13'; Pérez 23', 65'; Egusquiza 70'	Report	Juodyte 26'; Kalinauskaite 48'

Umpires:
Chen Hong (CHN)
Cecilia Valenzuela (CHI)

11 August 2009
12:15

Lithuania	1–2	France
Juodyte 9'	Report	Preney 54'; Boyer 67'

Umpires:
Emma Simmons (BER)
Mariana Reydo (ARG)

12 August 2009
12:15

Belarus	1–3	Spain
Kulinkovich 38'	Report	López 7'; Petchamé 10'; Pastor 70+'

Umpires:
Maritza Perez Castro (URU)
Nor Piza Hassan (MAS)

=== Fifth to sixteenth place classification ===
==== Fifteenth and sixteenth place ====
14 August 2009
11:00

Lithuania	2–4	Belarus
Vilkaite 24'; Juodyte 33'	Report	Kulinkovich 9', 20'; Mikheichik 14'; Bahushevich 58'

Umpires:
Belen Gonzalez (ESP)
Emma Simmons (BER)

==== Thirteenth and fourteenth place ====
15 August 2009
09:00

Spain	2–2 (a.e.t.)	France
García 47'; Bonastre 53'	Report	Texier 35+'; Rogeau 56'
Penalties
Bonastre (penalty shoot-out scored); Oliva (penalty shoot-out scored); Martín (penalty shoot-out scored); Puig (penalty shoot-out scored); Riera (penalty shoot-out scored)	5–3	(penalty shoot-out missed) Sansonetti; (penalty shoot-out scored) Roger; (penalty shoot-out scored) Richard; (penalty shoot-out scored) Munch

Umpires:
Cecilia Valenzuela (CHI)
Petra Muller (GER)

==== Eleventh and twelfth place ====
15 August 2009
11:30

Chile	0–4	South Africa
	Report	Irvine 10'; Coertzen 16', 62'; Madsen 56'

Umpires:
Chen Hong (CHN)
Julie Beamish (IRL)

==== Ninth and tenth place ====
15 August 2009
14:00

India	2–0	New Zealand
Devi 25', 69'	Report

Umpires:
Nor Piza Hassan (MAS)
Keely Dunn (CAN)

==== Seventh and eighth place ====
15 August 2009
16:30

United States	2–8	China
Reinprecht 66'; Gandhi 70'	Report	Zhang W. 11'; Zhao 31', 35', 44', 47', 56'; Fu 49'; Zhang Y. 63'

Umpires:
Mariana Reydo (ARG)
Caroline Brunekreef (NED)

==== Fifth and sixth place ====
16 August 2009
10:30

Australia	5–2	Germany
Jenner 13'; Dwyer 28', 48'; Hurtz 31', 56'	Report	Wilde 34'; Frank 47'

Umpires:
Michelle Joubert (RSA)
Irene Clelland (SCO)

=== First to fourth place classification ===
==== Semifinals ====
Semi-finals
14 August 2009
Netherlands	5
South Korea	0
14 August 2009
England	0
Argentina (a.e.t.)	1

Final
16 August 2009
Netherlands	3
Argentina	0
Third place
16 August 2009
South Korea	2
England	1

14 August 2009
13:30

Netherlands	5–0	South Korea
Van Maasakker 24', 40'; Jonker 34'; Willemse 45'; Van Male 63'	Report

Umpires:
Michelle Joubert (RSA)
Irene Presenqui (ARG)

14 August 2009
16:00

England	0–1 (a.e.t.)	Argentina
	Report	Dupuy 84'

Umpires:
Kelly Hudson (NZL)
Amy Hassick (USA)

==== Third and fourth place ====
16 August 2009
13:00

South Korea	2–1	England
Cheon S. 41'; Kim D. 58'	Report	Hall 52'

Umpires:
Claire Adenot (FRA)
Amy Hassick (USA)

==== Final ====
16 August 2009
15:30

Netherlands	3–0	Argentina
Bos 50'; Van Maasakker 61', 66'	Report

Umpires:
Kang Hyun-Young (KOR)
Frances Block (ENG)

== Awards ==
Player of the Tournament	Top Goalscorer	Goalkeeper of the Tournament	Fair Play Trophy
(Netherlands) Emilie Mol	(China) Zhao Yudiao	(England) Gemma Ible	South Africa

== Statistics ==
=== Final ranking ===
As per statistical convention in field hockey, matches decided in extra time are counted as wins and losses, while matches decided by penalty shoot-outs are counted as draws.

Pos	Team	Pld	W	D	L	GF	GA	GD	Pts	Final result
1st place, gold medalist(s)	Netherlands	8	7	0	1	26	5	+21	21	Gold Medal
2nd place, silver medalist(s)	Argentina	8	5	0	3	21	11	+10	15	Silver Medal
3rd place, bronze medalist(s)	South Korea	8	5	1	2	21	17	+4	16	Bronze Medal
4	England	8	4	2	2	15	8	+7	14	Fourth place
5	Australia	7	5	1	1	22	9	+13	16	Eliminated in medal round
6	Germany	7	3	2	2	16	13	+3	11	Eliminated in medal round
7	China	7	4	1	2	24	10	+14	13	Eliminated in medal round
8	United States	7	3	0	4	17	18	−1	9	Eliminated in medal round
9	India	7	4	0	3	18	11	+7	12	Eliminated in medal round
10	New Zealand	7	3	1	3	13	14	−1	10	Eliminated in medal round
11	South Africa	7	2	0	5	11	26	−15	6	Eliminated in medal round
12	Chile	7	1	0	6	4	20	−16	3	Eliminated in medal round
13	Spain	7	3	1	3	16	17	−1	10	Eliminated in group stage
14	France	7	2	1	4	8	22	−14	7	Eliminated in group stage
15	Belarus	7	1	0	6	11	28	−17	3	Eliminated in group stage
16	Lithuania	7	1	0	6	12	26	−14	3	Eliminated in group stage

Source: FIH

=== Goalscorers ===
There were 255 goals scored in 58 matches, for an average of 4.4 goals per match.

12 goals

- (China) Zhao Yudiao

8 goals

- (Netherlands) Caia van Maasakker

7 goals

- (India) Rani Devi
- (Netherlands) Kelly Jonker
- (New Zealand) Katie Glynn
- (South Korea) Cheon Seul-Ki

6 goals

- (Germany) Eva Frank

5 goals

- (Argentina) Delfina Merino
- (Belarus) Yuliya Mikheichik
- (Spain) Lola Riera

4 goals

- (Australia) Jill Dwyer
- (Australia) Casey Eastham
- (China) Sun Sinan
- (Germany) Pia Grambusch
- (Lithuania) Jurate Juodyte
- (South Korea) Yoo Jung-Mi
- (Spain) Beatriz Pérez

3 goals

- (Argentina) Rocío González Candia
- (Argentina) Victoria Zuloaga
- (Australia) Tegan Holcroft
- (Australia) Kate Jenner
- (Belarus) Krestina Kulinkovich
- (China) Zhang Wenting
- (Lithuania) Evelina Malyseva
- (Netherlands) Willemijn Willemse
- (South Korea) Bae So-Hyun
- (South Korea) Lee Sook-Yung
- (United States) Katie Reinprecht

2 goals

- (Argentina) Martina Cavallero
- (Argentina) Carla Dupuy
- (Australia) Marnie Hudson
- (Australia) Emily Hurtz
- (Australia) Danielle Schubach
- (Belarus) Sviatlana Bahushevich
- (Chile) Andrea Greene
- (England) Sophie Bray
- (England) Sara-Jo Coakley
- (England) Charlotte Craddock
- (England) Harriet Pearce
- (England) Loren Sherer
- (England) Lauren Turner
- (France) Elise Preney
- (Germany) Hannah Pehle
- (Germany) Celine Wilde
- (India) Monika Badran
- (India) Roselin Dung Dung
- (India) Poonam Rani
- (India) Ritu Rani
- (India) Preety Sunila Kiro
- (Lithuania) Giedre Kvilonaite
- (Netherlands) Elsemiek Groen
- (Netherlands) Emilie Mol
- (Netherlands) Kitty van Male
- (New Zealand) Gemma Flynn
- (South Africa) Louise Coertzen
- (South Africa) Nicole Kemp
- (South Africa) Nicolene Terblanche
- (South Korea) Hong Yoo-Jin
- (United States) Camille Gandhi
- (United States) Laura Gerbhart
- (United States) Melissa González
- (United States) Marta Malmberg
- (United States) Katie O'Donnell
- (United States) Michelle Vittese

1 goal

- (Argentina) Natalia del Frari
- (Argentina) Romina Lozzia
- (Argentina) Macarena Rojas
- (Argentina) Sofía Román
- (Argentina) Rocío Sánchez Moccia
- (Argentina) Luciana Soracco
- (Australia) Kate Denning
- (Australia) Rachel Miller
- (Belarus) Nastassia Shcharbakova
- (Chile) Camila Caram
- (Chile) Catalina Sclabos
- (China) Liao Jiahui
- (China) Fu Lixin
- (China) Zheng Qiuling
- (China) Sun Yang
- (China) Zhang Ying
- (England) Jenny Hall
- (England) Abigail Harper
- (England) Philippa Newton
- (France) Charlotte Boyer
- (France) Marie-Julie Munch
- (France) Athéna Richard
- (France) Apolline Rogeau
- (France) Perrine Roger
- (France) Bulle Texier
- (Germany) Lisa Hahn
- (Germany) Jana Teschke
- (India) Monorama Devi Asem
- (Lithuania) Ausra Bardauskaite
- (Lithuania) Ernesta Kalinauskaite
- (Lithuania) Monika Vilkaite
- (Netherlands) Willemijn Bos
- (Netherlands) Michelle van der Pols
- (New Zealand) Bridget Blackwood
- (New Zealand) Cathryn Finlayson
- (New Zealand) Ella Gunson
- (New Zealand) Petrea Webster
- (South Africa) Loreen Irvine
- (South Africa) Kelly Madsen
- (South Africa) Candice Manuel
- (South Africa) Catherine McNulty
- (South Africa) Kerry Pearton
- (South Korea) Kim Ah-Ra
- (South Korea) Kim Da-Young
- (Spain) Berta Bonastre
- (Spain) Virginia Egusquiza
- (Spain) Maialen García
- (Spain) María López
- (Spain) Paula Pastor
- (Spain) Carlota Petchamé
- (Spain) Andrea Puig
- (United States) Elizabeth Drazdowski
- (United States) Katelyn Falgowski

Source: FIH
