= 2008 Women's EuroHockey Junior Championship =

Tournament details
- Host country: Spain
- City: Valencia
- Dates: 20–26 July
- Teams: 8 (from 1 confederation)

Final positions
- Champions: Germany (8th title)
- Runner-up: Netherlands
- Third place: England

Tournament statistics
- Matches played: 20

The 2008 Women's EuroHockey Junior Championships was the 14th edition of the Women's EuroHockey Junior Championship, an under 21 women's field hockey tournament. It was held in Lille, France, from 20–26 July 2008.

Germany won the tournament for the eighth time after defeating the Netherlands 2–1 in the final. England won the bronze medal, defeating Belarus 5–2 in the third place playoff.

== Participating nations ==
Alongside the host nation, 7 teams competed in the tournament.

- Belarus
- Belgium
- England
- Germany
- Italy
- Lithuania
- Netherlands
- Spain

== Results ==
=== Preliminary round ===
==== Pool A ====
Pos	Team	Pld	W	D	L	GF	GA	GD	Pts	Qualification
1	Netherlands	3	3	0	0	15	2	+13	9	Semi-finals
2	Germany	3	2	0	1	7	4	+3	6	Semi-finals
3	Belgium	3	1	0	2	3	9	−6	3	
4	Spain	3	0	0	3	1	11	−10	0	

Source: EuroHockey
Rules for classification: 1) points; 2) goal difference; 3) goals scored; 4) head-to-head result.

20 July 2008
17:00

Germany	3–2	Belgium
Grambusch 9'; Hahn 17'; Wilde 19'	Report	Patriarche 3'; Boon 27'

20 July 2008
19:15

Spain	1–7	Netherlands
Dabanch 19'	Report	Van Maasakker 8', 48'; Van Male 21', 58'; Dirkse van den Heuvel 28'; Verbruggen 51'; Van Soest 55'

22 July 2008
17:00

Netherlands	2–1	Germany
Dirkse van den Heuvel 38'; Holman 61'	Report	Grambusch 12'

22 July 2008
19:15

Spain	0–1	Belgium
	Report	Donnet 29'

23 July 2008
17:00

Netherlands	6–0	Belgium
Holman 1', 29'; Van der Pols 27'; Vorstenbosch 40'; Dirkse van den Heuvel 60', 65'	Report

23 July 2008
19:15

Germany	3–0	Spain
Markert 22'; Gilica 65'; Otte 67'	Report

==== Pool B ====
Pos	Team	Pld	W	D	L	GF	GA	GD	Pts	Qualification
1	England	3	2	1	0	12	1	+11	7	Semi-finals
2	Belarus	3	1	2	0	5	3	+2	5	Semi-finals
3	Lithuania	3	1	0	2	1	7	−6	3	
4	Italy	3	0	1	2	2	9	−7	1	

Source: EuroHockey
Rules for classification: 1) points; 2) goal difference; 3) goals scored; 4) head-to-head result.

20 July 2008
09:00

England	5–0	Lithuania
Bray 7', 14', 21'; White 37'; Newton 40'	Report

20 July 2008
11:15

Italy	2–2	Belarus
Valabrega 13'; Cucca 42'	Report	Mikheichik 8'; Ambros 35'

21 July 2008
17:00

Belarus	1–1	England
Bahushevich 37'	Report	Long 58'

21 July 2008
19:15

Italy	0–1	Lithuania
	Report	Pauliukevičiūtė 5'

23 July 2008
09:00

Belarus	2–0	Lithuania
Tomal 46'; Scharbakova 61'	Report

23 July 2008
11:15

England	6–0	Italy
Hall 17'; H. Brown 19'; L. Brown 26'; Page 30'; Long 38'; Gilbert 45'	Report

=== Classification round ===
==== Fifth to eighth place classification ====
Points earned in the preliminary round are carried over into Pool C.

===== Pool C =====
Pos	Team	Pld	W	D	L	GF	GA	GD	Pts	Relegation
1	Spain	3	2	0	1	7	2	+5	6	
2	Lithuania	3	2	0	1	4	4	0	6	
3	Belgium	3	1	1	1	3	3	0	4	Relegated to 2012 EuroHockey Junior Championship II
4	Italy	3	0	1	2	1	6	−5	1	Relegated to 2012 EuroHockey Junior Championship II

Source: EuroHockey
Rules for classification: 1) points; 2) goal difference; 3) goals scored; 4) head-to-head result.

25 July 2008
09:00

Spain	3–1	Lithuania
Dabanch 21'; De Beraza 30'; Leirado 50'	Report	Dildaitė 47'

25 July 2008
11:15

Belgium	1–1	Italy
Coppey 27'	Report	Lombardi 34'

26 July 2008
09:00

Spain	4–0	Italy
	Report

26 July 2008
11:15

Belgium	1–2	Lithuania
De Groof 16'	Report	Paulavičiūtė 44'; Grubliauskaitė 67'

==== First to fourth place classification ====
Semi-finals
25 July 2008
Netherlands	6
Belarus	0
25 July 2008
England	1
Germany	5

Final
26 July 2008
Netherlands	1
Germany (a.e.t)	2
Third Place
26 July 2008
Belarus	2
England	5

===== Semi-finals =====
25 July 2008
17:00

England	1–5	Germany
White 53'	Report	Frank 11'; Wilde 32', 35'; Otte 33'; Grambusch 46'

25 July 2008
19:30

Netherlands	6–0	Belarus
Holman 14'; Vebruggen 26'; Dirkse van den Heuvel 45'; Van Dooren 61'; Groen 64'; Van der Pols 66'	Report

===== Third and fourth place =====
26 July 2008
17:00

Belarus	2–5	England
Zylianina 3'; Tomal 7'	Report	Bray 40', 50', 69'; Page 48'; Brown 66'

===== Final =====
26 July 2008
19:30

Netherlands	1–2 (a.e.t.)	Germany
Dirkse van den Heuvel 31'	Report	Hahn 13'; Wilde 75'
