= Anelle Lloyd =

South African field hockey player

Anelle van Deventer
Personal information
- Born: Anelle van Deventer; 6 December 1993 (age 32)

Sport
- Sport: Field hockey
- Position: Goalkeeper
National team
Years	Team	Caps	Goals
2014-	South Africa	48	(0)
- Updated on 28 November 2023

Anelle Lloyd (née van Deventer, born 6 December 1993) is a South African field hockey player who plays for the South Africa women's national field hockey team. She received her debut Women's Hockey World Cup call during the 2014 Women's Hockey World Cup, where South Africa finished at ninth position. She also competed at the Commonwealth Games with the national team in 2014.
