= Carla Dupuy =

Argentine field hockey player

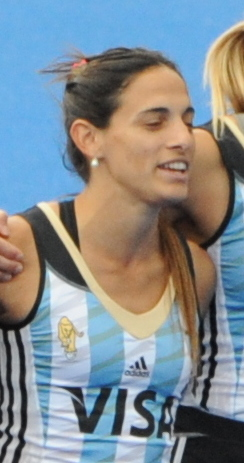
- in 2016

Personal information
- Born: September 18, 1988 (age 37) Buenos Aires, Argentina
- Height: 1.63 m (5 ft 4 in)

Sport
- Sport: Field hockey
- Position: Forward
- Club: [GEBA]
2016–Present	GEBA	-	-
National team
Years	Team	Caps	Goals
2009	Argentina U21		-
2009–2016	Argentina	96	-
Medal record
Women's Field hockey
Representing Argentina
World League
Gold medal – first place	2014-15 Rosario	Team
Champions Trophy
Gold medal – first place	2009 Sydney	Team
Gold medal – first place	2016 London	Team
Junior World Cup
Silver medal – second place	2009 Boston	Team
- Updated on October 23, 2012

Carla Dupuy (born 18 September 1988) is an Argentine field hockey player. At the 2009 Champions Trophy she competed for Argentina winning the gold medal in her first senior international tournament. She was chosen as an alternate player (P accreditation) for the 2012 Summer Olympics. After a brief participation with the national team in 2013, she returned in late 2015 and won the 2014–2015 World League.
