= Jacky Schoenaker =

Dutch hockey player (born 1988)

Personal information
- Born: July 28, 1988 (age 38) Rotterdam, Netherlands

Sport
- Sport: Field hockey
- Position: Midfield
Senior career
Years	Team	Caps	Goals
–	Qui Vive	-	-
2009-2013	AHBC	-	-
National team
Years	Team	Caps	Goals
2013-present	Netherlands		-
Medal record
Women's field hockey
Representing the Netherlands
Women's Hockey Junior World Cup
Gold medal – first place	2009 Boston	team
Women's Hockey World Cup
Gold medal – first place	2014 The Hague	team
Women's FIH Hockey World League
Gold medal – first place	2013	team
Women's EuroHockey Nations Championship
Silver medal – second place	2015 London	team
Bronze medal – third place	2013 Boom	team

Jacky Schoenaker (born 28 July 1988) is a Dutch hockey player who represents Netherlands in international matches. She made her international debut against Belgium on 14 July 2013 in a friendly match. She is also the daughter of former retired professional footballer Dick Schoenaker.

== Career ==
Jacky took up the sport of hockey at the age of six for Qui Vive club. She was called into the national side after being part of the victorious 2009 Women's Hockey Junior World Cup. She became a prominent member in the Dutch team since her debut in 2013 and was a key member of the Dutch side which claimed gold medal in 2012–13 Women's FIH Hockey World League and in the 2014 Women's Hockey World Cup.
