= Fleur van Dooren =

Dutch field hockey player (1989–2024)

Personal information
- Born: 26 January 1989
- Died: February 2024 (aged 35)
Medal record
Women's field hockey
Representing the Netherlands
Junior World Cup
Gold medal – first place	2009 Boston	Team
Champions Trophy
Bronze medal – third place	2008 M'gladbach	Team

Fleur van Dooren (26 January 1989 – February 2024) was a Dutch field hockey player who played with HC Rotterdam, Pinoké and the Netherlands women's national field hockey team. She became Junior World Champion in 2008 and was the bronze Champions Trophy medal winner. She played for twelve years in the Hoofdklasse, the highest hockey league in the Netherlands and played in New Zealand in the New Zealand National Hockey League.

== Biography ==
At the age of 5 years old Van Dooren started playing field hockey at the club HC Rotterdam in Rotterdam and started playing matches when she was seven years old. When she was 15 years old she made her debut for the senior women's team. She played twelve years in the Hoofdklasse. She also played one season with Pinoké. After high school (in Dutch middelbare school), she played in New Zealand with Midlands in the New Zealand National Hockey League for a period of time.

In 2008 she made her debut with the Netherlands women's national field hockey team. At the 2008 Women's Hockey Champions Trophy in Mönchengladbach she won with the Dutch team the bronze medal. She played multiple matches, including the semi-final. In 2009 she became world champion at the 2009 Women's Hockey Junior World Cup with the Netherlands women's national under-21 field hockey team.

After her hockey career, she became a jurist and wrote her own music.

Van Dooren had major depressive disorder for eight years that worsened after the death of her mother. She died via euthanasia in February 2024, at the age of 35. Her father and sister were with her during her final moments.
