= Bianca Joyce =

Australian field hockey player

Personal information
- Born: 21 March 1990 (age 36) Nantawarra, South Australia

Sport
- Sport: Field hockey
- Position: Midfielder
National team
Years	Team	Caps	Goals
2011–2013	Australia	38	(1)
Medal record
Women's field hockey
Representing Australia
Champions Challenge I
Gold medal – first place	2012 Dublin	Team

Bianca Joyce (née Greenshields; born 21 March 1990) is a former Australian field hockey player, who played as a midfielder.

== Personal life ==
Bianca Joyce was born in Nantawarra, South Australia.

She married her husband, Tom, in 2013 and the pair now reside in Crystal Brook.

== Career ==
=== Club level ===
During her career, Joyce was a member of Port Adelaide District Hockey Club before she moved to Perth, Western Australia in 2011 to join the Hockey Australia High Performance Program, as a member of the Hockeyroos squad.

=== Hockeyroos ===
Following a successful campaign in the 2010 AHL, Joyce was called up to make her debut for the Australian national team in 2011. She made her official debut in February 2011, in a test match against Argentina.

In November 2011, following her string of performances throughout the year, Joyce was named in the Hockeyroos 27 player training squad for the 2012 Olympic Games in London, United Kingdom. After failing to make the Olympics, Joyce was a member of the team at the 2012 Champions Challenge I in Dublin, Ireland, where she won a gold medal.

Joyce retired in 2013 after making 38 appearances for Australia.

==== International goals ====
Goal	Date	Location	Opponent	Score	Result	Competition	Ref.
1	18 October 2011	Perth Hockey Stadium, Perth, Australia	India	6–0	6–0	Test Match	
