= Marnie Hudson =

Australian field hockey player

Personal information
- Full name: Marnie Elizabeth Hudson
- Born: 21 August 1988 (age 38) Gold Coast, Queensland

Sport
- Sport: Field hockey
- Position: Forward
Senior career
Years	Team	Caps	Goals
2008–2012	QLD Scorchers	49	10
National team
Years	Team	Caps	Goals
2008–2009	Australia U–21	14	(4)
2011–2012	Australia	28	(2)
Medal record
Women's field hockey
Representing Australia
Junior Oceania Cup
Gold medal – first place	2008 Brisbane	Team
Australian Youth Olympic Festival
Silver medal – second place	2009 Sydney	Team

Marnie Elizabeth Hudson (born 21 August 1988) is a former field hockey player from Australia, who played as a forward.

== Personal life ==
Marnie Hudson was born and raised in Gold Coast, Queensland.

== Career ==
=== Domestic hockey ===
==== Club hockey ====
Throughout her youth and senior career, Hudson has continued to play for her home club, Labrador. Located in her home town, the Gold Coast, Labrador has been Hudson's club since her introduction to hockey at age 5.

==== AHL ====
Marnie Hudson made her debut into Hockey Australia's premier domestic competition, the Australian Hockey League (AHL), in 2008. She played for her home state, as a member of the Queensland Scorchers. She represented the team on five occasions, spanning from 2008 to 2012. During this time, she won three consecutive silver medals, in 2008, 2009 and 2010.

=== International teams ===
==== Under–21 ====
In 2008, Hudson made her first appearance for her country as a member of the Australia U–21 side. the Jillaroos, at the Junior Oceania Cup in Brisbane. At the tournament, Australia won gold, directly qualifying to the 2009 FIH Junior World Cup in Boston.

Hudson represented the team on two occasions in 2009. Her first tournament was at the 2009 Australian Youth Olympic Festival in Sydney, winning a silver medal. This was followed by an appearance at the FIH Junior World Cup, where the team finished 5th.

==== Hockeyroos ====
Following standout performances for the Jillaroos, Hudson was first named to the Australia squad in 2011. She also made her debut that year in a four-nations tournament in Mendoza. Her first and only major tournament with the team was the 2011 Champions Trophy in Amstelveen. The team finished in 6th position, with Hudson scoring twice.

=== International goals ===
Goal	Date	Location	Opponent	Score	Result	Competition	Ref.
1	1 July 2011	Wagener Stadium, Amstelveen, Netherlands	England	1–1	2–3	2011 FIH Champions Trophy	
2	1 July 2011	Wagener Stadium, Amstelveen, Netherlands	England	2–3	2–3	2011 FIH Champions Trophy	
