= Karri McMahon =

Australian field hockey player

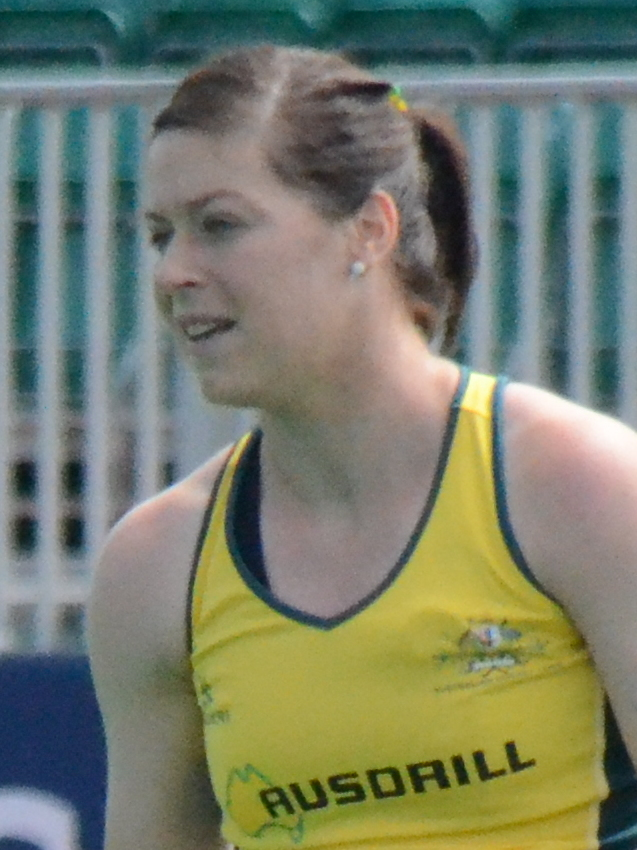
- Karri McMahon in 2013

Personal information
- Born: 27 February 1992 (age 34) Townsville, Queensland
- Height: 1.79 m (5 ft 10 in)
- Weight: 75 kg (165 lb)

Sport
- Sport: Field hockey
- Position: Defender
- Club: Northcoast Raiders, Perth
National team
| Years | Team | Caps | Goals |
| 2012– | Australia | 152 | (10) |
Medal record
Women's field hockey
Representing Australia
World Cup
| Silver medal – second place | 2014 The Hague | Team |
Champions Trophy
| Silver medal – second place | 2014 Mendoza | Team |
| Silver medal – second place | 2018 Changzhou | Team |
Commonwealth Games
| Gold medal – first place | 2014 Glasgow | Team |
| Silver medal – second place | 2018 Gold Coast | Team |

Karri McMahon (born 27 February 1992) is an Australian field hockey player for the Hockeyroos who plays as a defender.

McMahon was a member of the Australia women's national field hockey team that won a silver medal at the 2014 Rabobank Hockey World Cup, a Gold Medal winner at the 2014 Commonwealth Games and member of the team that went to the 2016 Summer Olympics.

== Personal ==
McMahon was born on 27 February 1992 in Townsville, Queensland. She grew up in Brisbane before moving to Berri, South Australia during late primary school. She attended Patrick’s Road Primary School before transitioning to Berri Primary school then to Glossop High School. On completion of year 12, McMahon headed to Adelaide to study Paramedicine at Flinders University.

She began playing hockey at the age of 6 for Arana Ascot, a local club in Brisbane before continuing her hockey In South Australia with Berri Hockey Club and then the Adelaide Hockey Club.

Outside of hockey, McMahon finished her Bachelor of Clinical Practice (Paramedicine) in 2018 with Charles Sturt University. She began a role in 2019 with St John Ambulance as a Patient Transporter and in 2020 commenced an Injury Management role with Ausdrill Ltd. She enjoys hiking, camping and exploring the West Coast in her spare time.

== Field hockey ==
=== Club ===
McMahon began her hockey with Arana Ascot Hockey Club. Once moved to South Australia, she played for Berri Hockey Club in the Riverland before moving to Adelaide to play for the Adelaide Peas. Once in Perth with the national team, McMahon has been drafted to YMCC, Fremantle HC, Suburban Lions and is now with Northcoast Raiders.

=== State ===
In 2011, McMahon was a member of the Australian Hockey League team the Southern Suns that won the national championship for the second time ever, 18 years after their first title.

In 2013, she was named the best player in the Australian Hockey League. In 2015, McMahon suffered a number of on-field injuries including a double fracture to her jaw, a ball to the head which required stitches and a stress fracture in her foot. Since then he has endured 4 knee surgeries and over 150 international games for Australia.

=== International ===
She made her debut for Australia in September 2012 against South Africa at the age of 20 at the Champions Trophy in Ireland. She was co-captain at the 2013 Junior World Cup where Australia finished sixth.

McMahon was a member of the Australia team that won a silver medal at the 2015 Rabobank Hockey World Cup in The Hague. She was a part of the gold medal winning team at the 2014 Commonwealth Games. McMahon earned a silver medal at 3 consecutive Champions Trophy tournaments in Mendoza, London and Changzhou. She was selected in 16 women Australia team who competed at 2016 Summer Olympic Games in Rio De Janeiro.

She has played in the following tournaments:

- 2012 Women's Hockey Champions Challenge I: 1st.
- 2013 Women's Hockey Junior World Cup| Mönchengladbach: 6th.
- 2012–13 Women's FIH Hockey World League Semifinals| London : 1st.
- 2012–13 Women's FIH Hockey World League Final in Tucumán: 2nd.
- 2014 Rabobank Women's Hockey World Cup| The Hague: 2nd.
- 2014 Commonwealth Games – Women's tournament|Glasgow : 1st.
- 2014 Women's Hockey Champions Trophy|Mendoza: 2nd.
- 2014–15 Women's FIH Hockey World League Semifinals|Antwerp: 3rd.
- 2015 Oceania Cup|Stratford: 1st
- 2015 FIH World League Final | Rosario: 6th.
- 2016 Women's Hockey Champions Trophy|London: 4th.
- 2016 Summer Olympics | Rio de Janeiro: 5th quarter finals.
- 2018 Commonwealth Games | Gold Coast: 2nd.
- 2018 Investec Women’s Hockey World Cup | London: 4th.
- 2020 FIH Hockey Pro League

==== International Goals ====
| Goal | Date | Location | Opponent | Score | Result | Competition | Ref. |
|---|---|---|---|---|---|---|---|
| 1 | 28 April 2013 | Perth Hockey Stadium, Perth, Australia | South Korea | 1–2 | 1–3 | Test Match | |
| 2 | 27 June 2013 | University of Westminster, London, England | United States | 3–1 | 4–1 | 2012–13 HWL Semifinals | |
| 3 | 7 December 2013 | Club Natación y Gimnasia, San Miguel de Tucumán, Argentina | England | 3–0 | 3–0 | 2012–13 HWL Final | |
| 4 | 25 March 2014 | Perth Hockey Stadium, Perth, Australia | Japan | 2–1 | 5–2 | Test Match | |
| 5 | 15 November 2014 | National Hockey Stadium, Wellington, New Zealand | New Zealand | 1–2 | 2–2 | Test Match | |
| 6 | 15 November 2014 | National Hockey Stadium, Wellington, New Zealand | New Zealand | 2–2 | 2–2 | Test Match | |
| 7 | 24 June 2015 | KHC Dragons, Antwerp, Belgium | Belgium | 2–0 | 2–0 | 2014–15 HWL Semifinals | |
| 8 | 22 October 2015 | TET MultiSports Centre, Stratford, New Zealand | Samoa | 16–0 | 25–0 | 2015 Oceania Cup | |
| 9 | 16 February 2016 | Perth Hockey Stadium, Perth, Australia | Great Britain | 2–2 | 3–3 | Test Match | |
| 10 | 20 January 2018 | Perth Hockey Stadium, Perth, Australia | Spain | 3–2 | 3–2 | Test Match | |
