= Alesha Widdall =

American woman Field hockey player (born 1990)

Personal information
- Nationality: American
- Born: January 3, 1990 (age 36) Triangle, New York

Sport
- Country: United States
- Sport: Field hockey
- Position: Goalkeeper
Medal record
Pan American Cup
| Bronze medal – third place | 2017 Lancaster |

Alesha Widdall (born January 3, 1990) is an American Field hockey player. She hails from Whitney Point, New York and played as a goalkeeper. She was part of the United States women's national field hockey team at the 2016 Summer Olympics. She retired from the national team in 2018.
