= Danielle Schubach =

Australian field hockey player

Personal information
- Born: 28 April 1988 (age 38) Altona, Victoria

Sport
- Sport: Field hockey
- Position: Forward
National team
Years	Team	Caps	Goals
2009	Australia U–21	11	(2)
2009–2013	Australia	13	(2)
Medal record
Women's field hockey
Representing Australia
Australian Youth Olympic Festival
Silver medal – second place	2009 Sydney	Team

Danielle Schubach (born 28 April 1988) is a former Australian field hockey player.

== Personal life ==
Danielle Schubach was born and raised in Altona, Victoria.

== Career ==
=== State level ===
At Australian level, Schubach plays representative hockey for her home state Victoria in the Australian Hockey League.

With the Victorian Vipers, Schubach won two national titles, in 2012 and 2017.

=== National teams ===
==== Under–21 ====
Danielle Schubach first represented Australia at a junior level, when she debuted for the Australia U–21 side in 2009. Her first appearance was at the 2009 Australian Youth Olympic Festival in Sydney. Later that year, she was selected in the team for the Junior World Cup in Boston, where the team finished fifth.

==== Hockeyroos ====
In addition to her junior debut, Schubach also made her senior international debut for the Hockeyroos in 2009, during a test match against South Africa in Durban. Schubach went on to represent the team at the Spar Cup, with matches against Argentina, India and South Africa.

Following her 2009 debut, Schubach did not represent Australia again until 2013 when she was called into the team for the Investec Cup in Cape Town. This would also be her last appearance for the Hockeyroos.
