= Kate Denning =

Australian field hockey player

Personal information
- Born: 14 December 1989 (age 36) South Perth, Western Australia

Sport
- Sport: Field hockey
- Position: Midfielder
- Club: Adelaide Fire
National team
Years	Team	Caps	Goals
2007–2009	Australia U–21	22	(1)
2009–2014	Australia	4	(0)
Medal record
Women's field hockey
Representing Australia
Australian Youth Olympic Festival
Silver medal – second place	2007 Sydney	Team

Kate Denning (born 14 December 1989) is an Australian field hockey player.

== Personal life ==
Denning was born and raised in South Perth, Western Australia. Her mother is a former Australian international player and Olympic gold medallist, Elspeth Denning.

She studied medicine at the University of Western Australia, and is now a fully qualified doctor.

== Career ==
=== State level ===
Until 2018, Denning represented her home state, Western Australia, in domestic competitions. In 2019, she was named in the Adelaide Fire women's team for the inaugural tournament of Australia's new domestic competition, Hockey One.

=== National teams ===
==== Under–21 ====
In 2007, Denning was first named in the Australia U–21 side, 'The Jillaroos'. She followed this up with a number of appearances for the side, her final game at the 2009 Junior World Cup in Boston, Massachusetts.

==== Hockeyroos ====
Denning made her senior international debut for the Hockeyroos in 2009, during a test match against Germany in Perth, Western Australia.

Following her 2009 debut, Denning did not make another appearance for the team until 2014. She was named in the preliminary squad for the Champions Trophy, but only appeared in a test series against New Zealand in Wellington, New Zealand.
