= Georgia Nanscawen =

Australian sportswoman

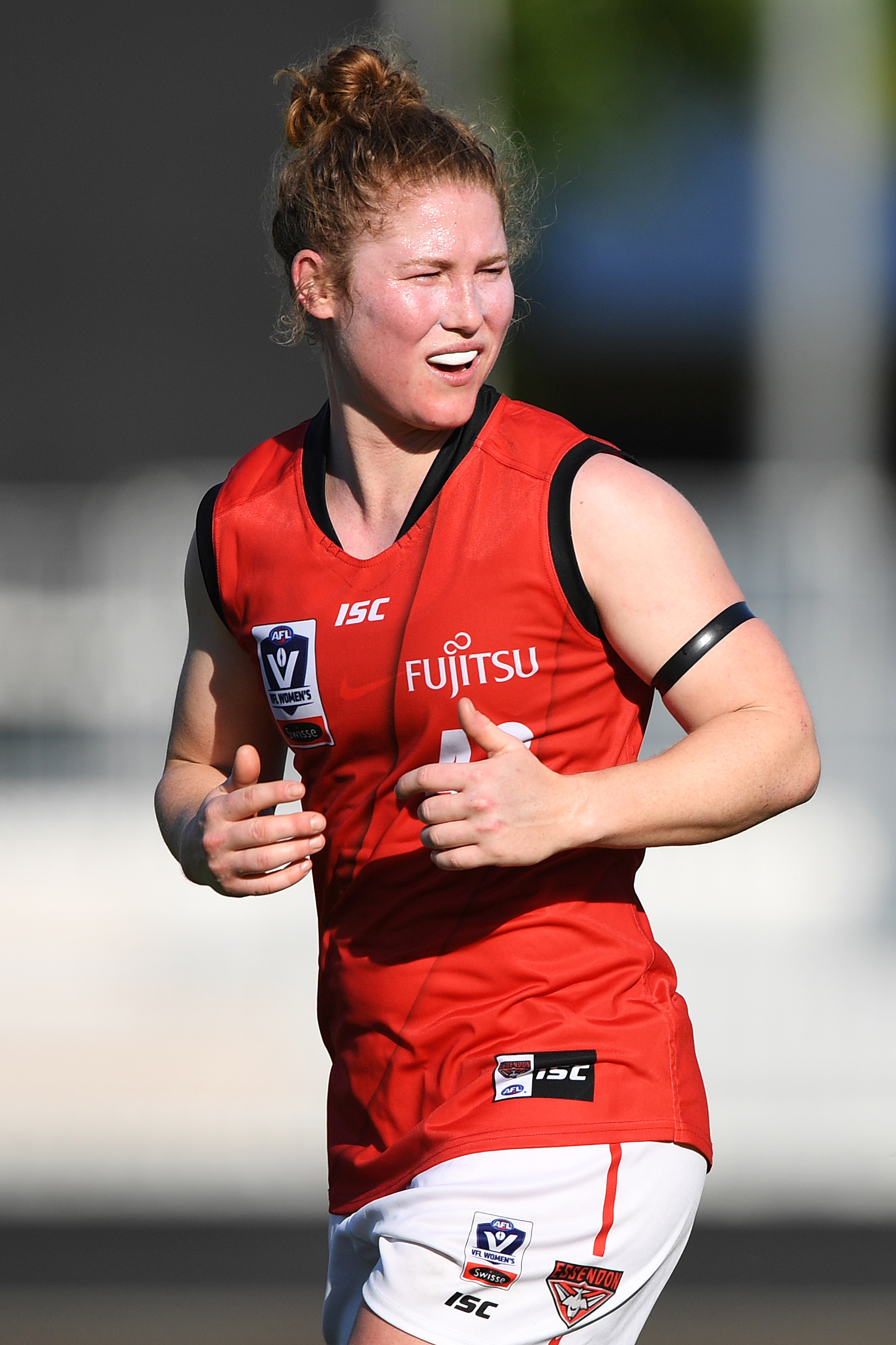
- Nanscawen in June 2019

Personal information
- Full name: Georgia Nanscawen
- Born: 27 May 1992 (age 34) Brunswick, Victoria
- Height: 1.6 m (5 ft 3 in)
- Weight: 58 kg (128 lb)

Sport
- Sport: Field hockey
- Position: Midfielder
- Club: Victorian Vipers
National team
Years	Team	Caps	Goals
2009–	Australia	205	(37)
Medal record
Women's field hockey
Representing Australia
World Cup
Silver medal – second place	2014 The Hague	Team
Commonwealth Games
Gold medal – first place	2014 Glasgow	Team
Champions Trophy
Silver medal – second place	2009 Sydney	Team
Silver medal – second place	2014 Mendoza	Team

Georgia Nanscawen (/ˈnænskɔːn/ NAN-skawn; born 27 May 1992) is an Australian rules footballer and former field hockey player.

== Field hockey career ==
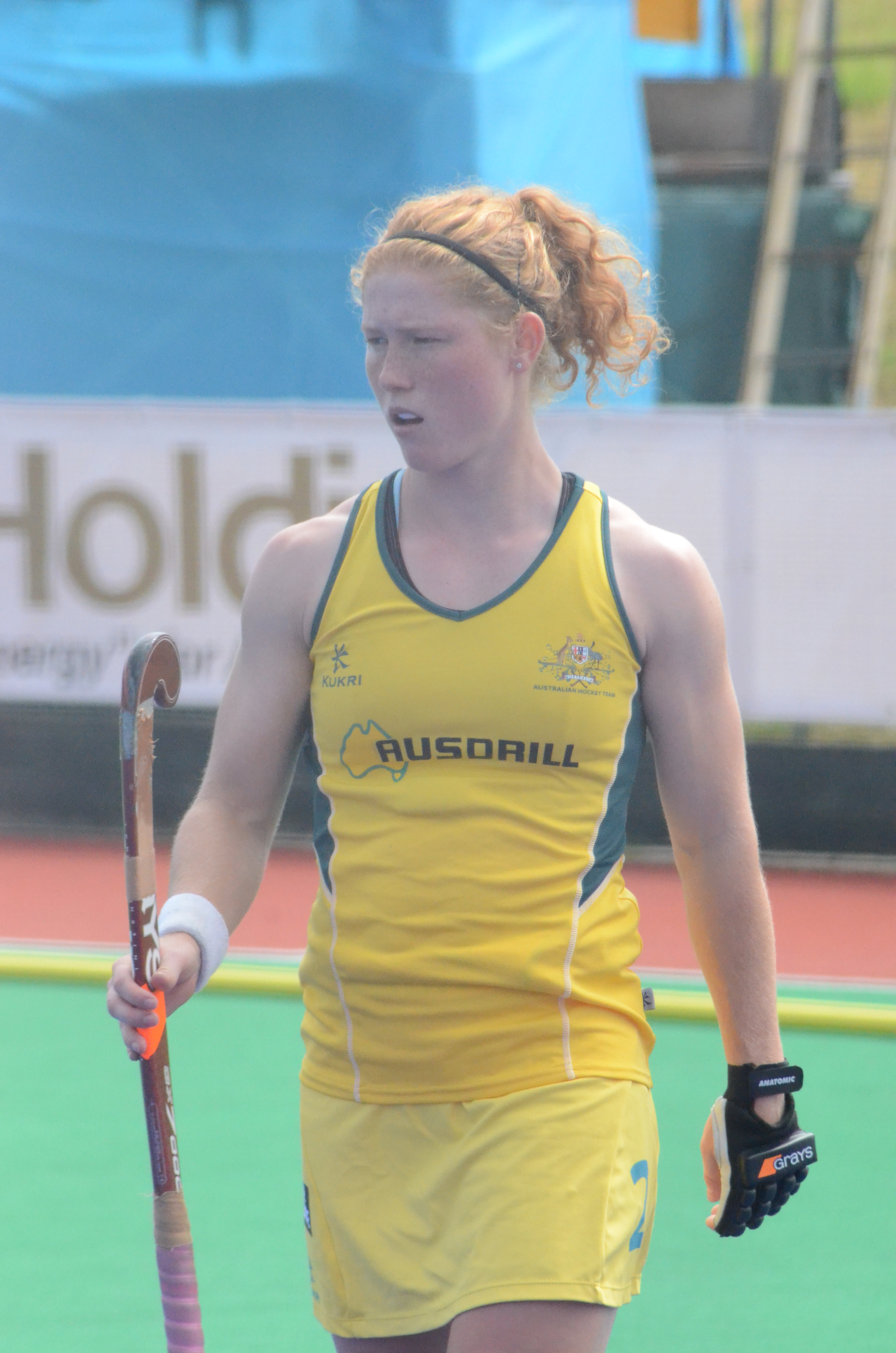
Nanscawen playing for Australia in 2013.

Georgia Nanscawen is a former Field Hockey Player for Australia. She retired in 2018 with 205 caps and scored 37 goals. She was selected for the Hockeyroos as a 16 year old school girl (the third youngest selected player) and made her debut in Durban, South Africa the day after her 17th birthday, scoring a goal on debut. She is the youngest woman to play 100 and 150 international matches for Australia. She commenced her hockey career aged 5 with the Essendon Hockey Club and aged 13 was the first girl to win an Essendon Hockey Club Boys Best and Fairest Award. She was also the first girl to captain a boys shield team. She represented Victoria at State Level in 2003, 2004, 2005, 2006, 2007 and 2008. She was awarded a full Victorian Institute Hockey Scholarship in 2008. In February 2009 she was selected into the Senior Victorian Team (The Victorian Vipers) playing in the Australian Hockey League (AHL). Following the conclusion of the tournament she was selected into the Australian Team. As part of the Victorian Vipers competing in the AHL she was a member of the gold winning teams in 2012 and 2017 and in 2016 was named Player of the Tournament. She was also named in the Victorian Vipers ALL STAR team in 2018. Her major International Tournaments include:

CHAMPIONS TROPHY, Sydney Australia 2009 (Silver) JUNIOR WORLD CUP, Boston USA 2009 WORLD CUP, Rosario Argentina 2010 OCEANIA CUP, Hobart, Australia 2011 CHAMPIONS CHALLENGE, London UK 2012 OLYMPIC GAMES, London UK 2012 WORLD LEAGUE (semi final) London UK 2013 (gold) JUNIOR WORLD CUP, Monchengladbach, Germany 2013 WORLD CUP, The Hague, Netherlands 2014 (Silver) COMMONWEALTH GAMES, Glasgow, Scotland 2014 (Gold) CHAMPIONS TROPHY Mendoza, Argentina 2014 (Silver) HOCKEY WORLD LEAGUE, Antwerp, Belgium 2015 (Bronze) CHAMPIONS TROPHY, London, UK 2016 WORLD LEAGUE, Belgium 2017

== AFL Women's career ==
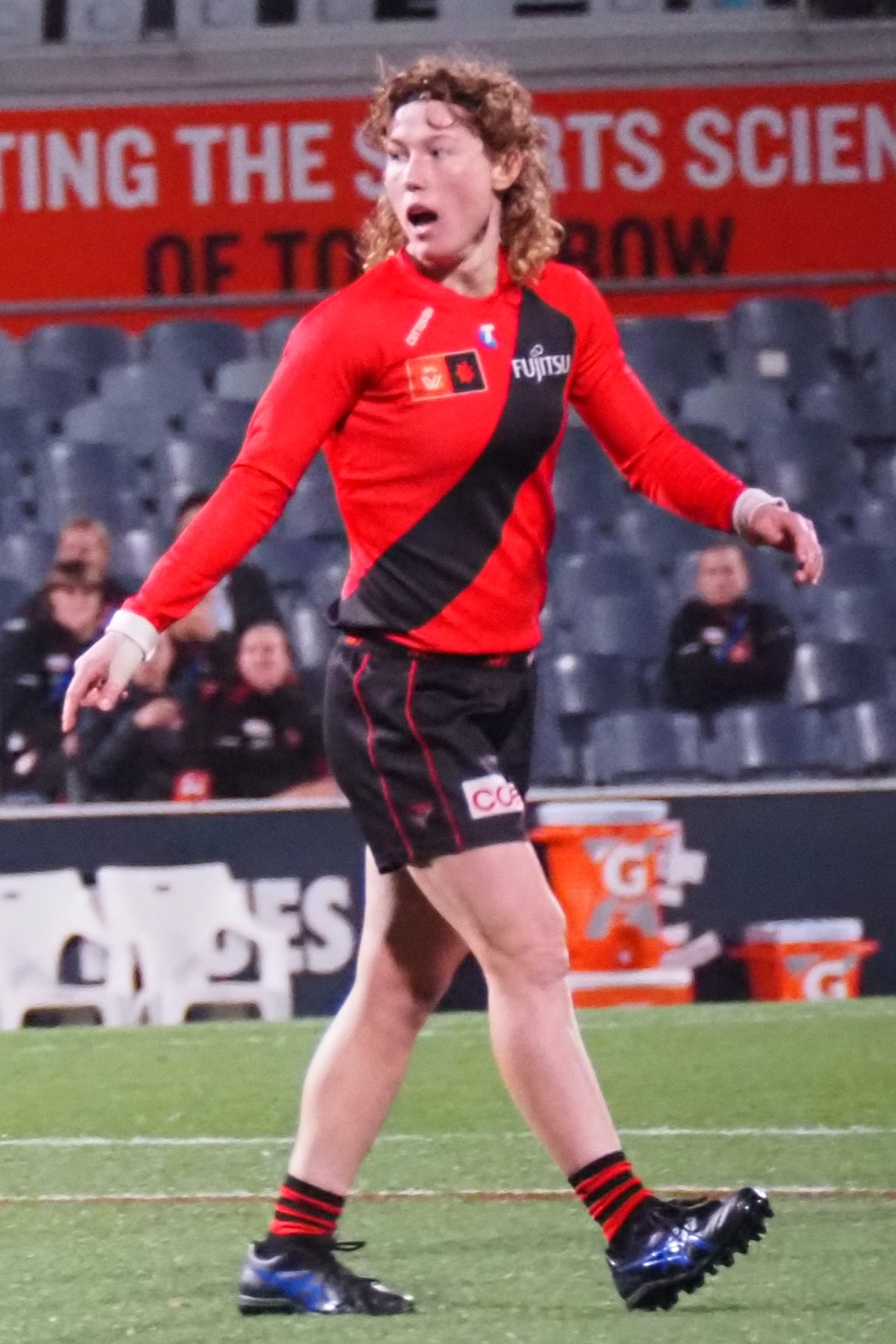
Nanscawen playing for Essendon in 2025

In May 2018 she announced that she would join North Melbourne in the AFL Women's for the 2019 season. She made her AFLW football debut in the opening round, when North Melbourne beat Carlton. At the end of the season, she was delisted by North Melbourne. Since 2019 she has played for Essendon in the VFL Women's (VFLW) competition, winning the club's best and fairest in 2019 and being made captain in 2021. she was also named in the 2019 VFLW team of the year.

In 2021, Nanscawen was named the 2021 VFL Women's season best and fairest and awarded the Lambert–Pearce Medal. With 17 votes, she finished four clear atop the leaderboard. She was also named as captain in the VFLW team of the year. In March 2022, Nanscawen signed as Essendon's first AFLW player. She was selected as co-captain of the Essendon VFLW team and led the team to their first premiership. During the course of the VFLW grand final she ruptured her ACL putting her out of the inaugural AFLW season in which she was also voted as co-vice captain . She also won consecutive Lambert–Pearce Medals polling 33 votes from a possible 36 votes. She also took out the inaugural VFLW Coaches Association MVP and was named in her third consecutive VFLW Team of the Year. She also won a second Essendon VFLW Best and Fairest.

2024 was a breakout year in the AFLW

- Equal 4th (17 votes) in AFLW league

- All Australian Squad Selection - AFLW Coaches MVP - 10th

- Essendon AFLW runner up - Essendon AFLW Players Player.

2025 - Essendon AFLW Best and Fairest - Equal 6th (13 votes) in AFLW league best and fairest.
