= Kirstin Dwyer =

Australian field hockey player

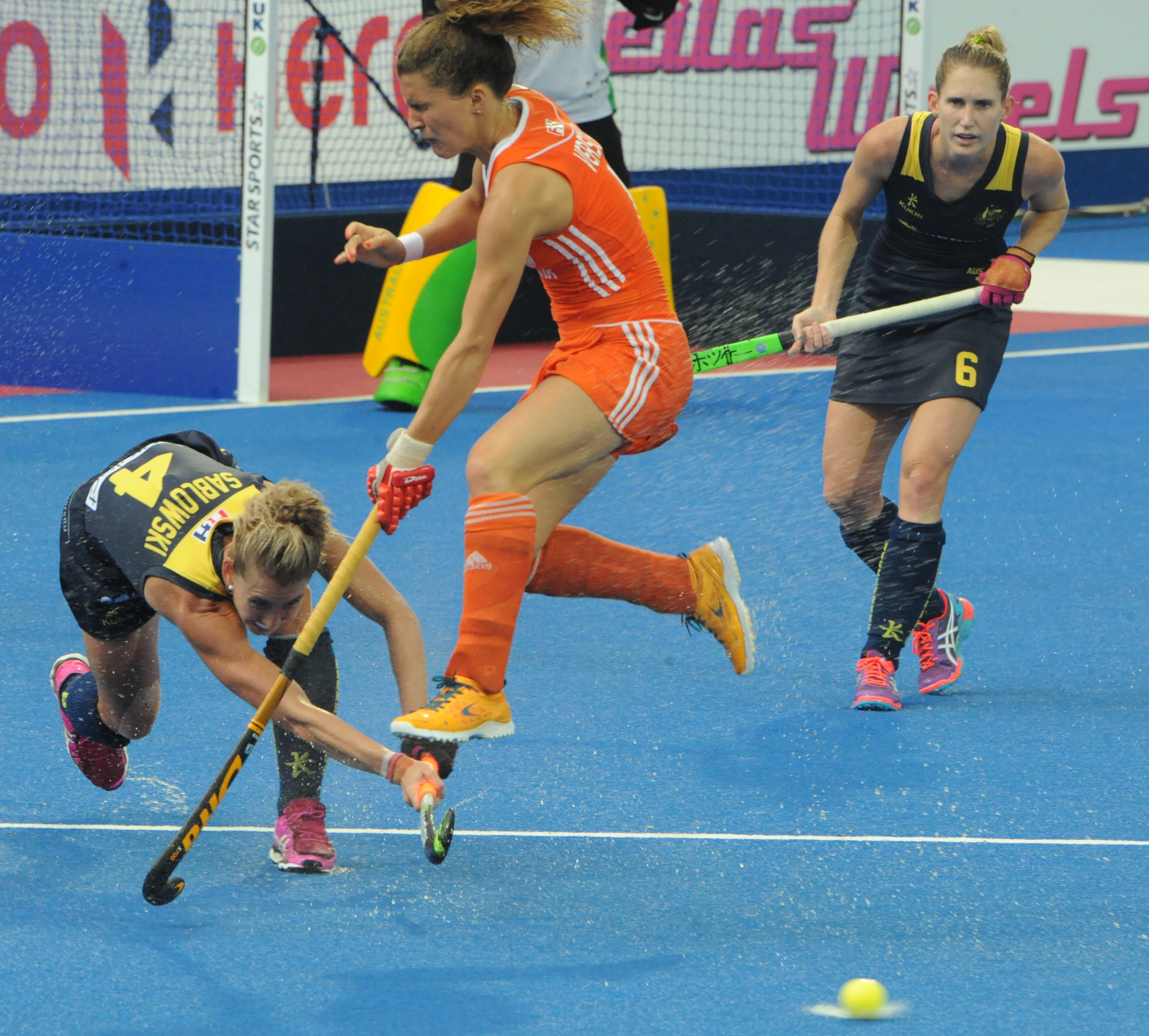
- Dwyer (#6) versus the Netherlands in 2016

Personal information
- Full name: Kirstin Sheree Dwyer
- Nationality: Australian
- Born: 15 March 1989 (age 37) Mackay, Australia
- Height: 1.73 m (5 ft 8 in)
- Weight: 66 kg (146 lb)

Sport
- Country: Australia
- Sport: Field hockey
Medal record
Oceania Cup
| Gold medal – first place | 2017 Sydney |

Kirstin Sheree Dwyer (born 15 March 1989), is an Australian field hockey player. She is a member of the Australia women's national field hockey team.

She represented her country at the 2015 Oceania Cup, and the 2016 Summer Olympics. Kirstin currently plays for Perth Women's Premier 1's team Suburban Lions.

Kirstin was raised on a cane farm in Central Queensland by her parents, Trish and Ian. She is one of the three siblings with brother Reece and sister, Alyscia.
