= Nicolene Terblanche =

South African field hockey player

Personal information
- Born: 22 February 1988 (age 38) Groblersdal, South Africa
- Height: 1.61 m (5 ft 3 in)
- Weight: 58 kg (128 lb)

Sport
- Sport: Field hockey
- Position: Defender
National team
Years	Team	Caps	Goals
2010–	South Africa	215	-
Medal record
African Cup of Nations
Gold medal – first place	2013 Nairobi
Gold medal – first place	2017 Ismailia

Nicolene Terblanche (born 22 February 1988) is a South African field hockey player. At the 2012 Summer Olympics she competed with the South Africa women's national field hockey team in the women's tournament.
