= Heather Langham =

Australian field hockey player (born 1989)

Olympic medal record

Women's field hockey

Representing Australia

Heather Langham (born 11 July 1989) is an Australian field hockey player.
