= Jill Gohdes =

Australian field hockey player (born 1990)

Personal information
- Born: 19 May 1990 (age 36) Queensland

Sport
- Sport: Field hockey
- Position: Forward
Senior career
Years	Team	Caps	Goals
2009–2015	QLD Scorchers	62	11
National team
Years	Team	Caps	Goals
2008–2009	Australia U–21	14	(5)
2011	Australia	10	(1)
Medal record
Women's field hockey
Representing Australia
Junior Oceania Cup
Gold medal – first place	2008 Brisbane	Team
Australian Youth Olympic Festival
Silver medal – second place	2009 Sydney	Team

Jill Gohdes (née Dwyer) (born 19 May 1990) is a former field hockey player from Australia, who played as a forward.

== Personal life ==
Jill Gohdes is married to fellow former Australian representative, Matthew Gohdes. The couple married in December 2015 and have four children.

== Career ==
=== Domestic hockey ===
==== Club hockey ====
In her home competition, Division 1 of Hockey Queensland's BWHA, Gohdes represents the Easts Tigers.

==== AHL ====
Gohdes made her debut in the Australian Hockey League (AHL) in 2009, as a member of the Queensland Scorchers. Her AHL career spanned seven years, from 2009 to 2015. Throughout this time, she won two AHL titles, in 2013 and 2015.

=== International hockey ===
==== Under–21 ====
In 2008, Gohdes made her first appearance for her country as a member of the Australia U–21 side, the Jillaroos, at the Junior Oceania Cup in Brisbane. At the tournament, Australia won gold, directly qualifying to the 2009 FIH Junior World Cup in Boston.

Gohdes represented the team on two occasions in 2009. Her first tournament was at the 2009 Australian Youth Olympic Festival in Sydney, winning a silver medal. This was followed by an appearance at the FIH Junior World Cup, where the team finished 5th.

==== Hockeyroos ====
Despite being a member of the development squad, Gohdes was called up to make her debut for Australia in 2011, during a four-nations tournament in Rosario. She followed this with a string of appearances during test series' in October against India and China, respectively.

She was again named in the development squad in 2012, however did not make any further appearances for the Hockeyroos.
