= Emily Hurtz =

Australian field hockey player (born 1990)

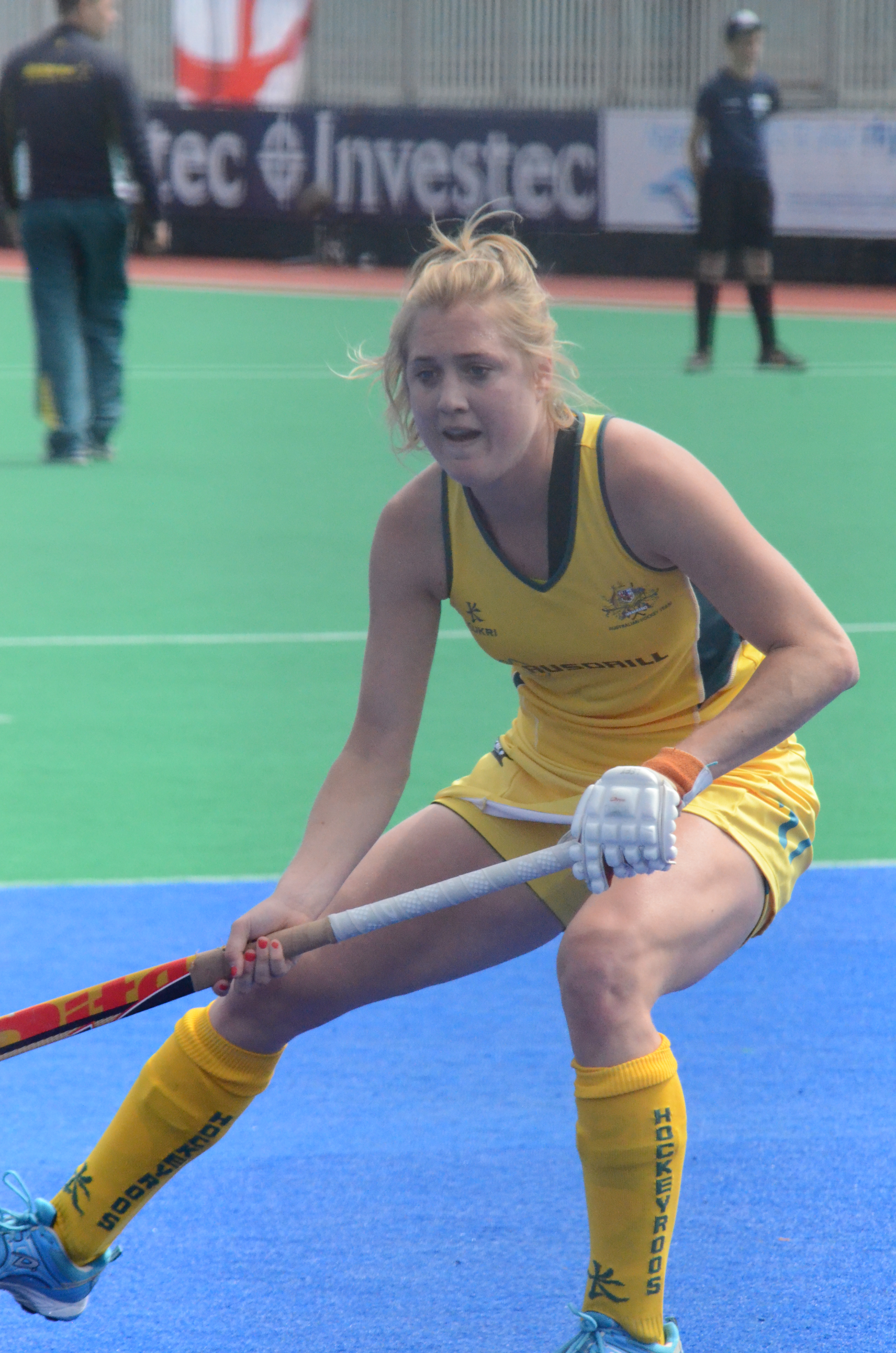
- Hurtz in 2013

Personal information
- Born: 2 January 1990 (age 36) Darlinghurst, NSW
- Height: 1.75 m (5 ft 9 in)

Sport
- Sport: Field hockey
- Position: Attacker
- Club: Victorian Vipers
National team
Years	Team	Caps	Goals
2009–	Australia	108	(36)
Medal record
Women's field hockey
Representing Australia
World Cup
Silver medal – second place	2014 The Hague
Commonwealth Games
Gold medal – first place	2010 New Delhi	Team
Champions Trophy
Silver medal – second place	2009 Sydney

Emily Hurtz (born 2 January 1990) is an Australian field hockey player.
