= 2002 Women's Australian Hockey League =

Tournament details
- Host country: Australia
- Dates: 2 March – 14 April
- Teams: 8
- Venue: 8 (in 8 host cities)

Final positions
- Champions: (New South Wales) NSWIS Arrows (7th title)
- Runner-up: (Queensland) QLD Scorchers
- Third place: (Australian Capital Territory) Canberra Strikers

Tournament statistics
- Matches played: 51
- Goals scored: 208 (4.08 per match)
- Top scorer: (Queensland) Nicole Hudson (16 goals)
- Best player: (Victoria (state)) Louise Dobson

The 2002 Women's Australian Hockey League was the 10th edition women's field hockey tournament. The tournament was held in various cities across Australia, and was contested from 2 March through to 14 April 2003.

NSWIS Arrows won the tournament for the seventh time after defeating QLD Scorchers 4–2 in the final. Canberra Strikers finished in third place after defeating Adelaide Suns 3–2 in the third and fourth place playoff.

== Participating teams ==
- (Australian Capital Territory) Canberra Strikers
- (New South Wales) NSWIS Arrows
- (Northern Territory) Territory Pearls
- (Queensland) QLD Scorchers
- (South Australia) Adelaide Suns
- (Tasmania) Tassie Van Demons
- (Victoria (state)) VIS Vipers
- (Western Australia) WAIS Diamonds

== Competition format ==
The 2002 Women's Australian Hockey League consisted of a single round robin format, followed by classification matches.

Teams from all 8 states and territories competed against one another throughout the pool stage. At the conclusion of the pool stage, the top four ranked teams progressed to the semi-finals, while the bottom four teams continued to the classification stage.

The first four rounds of the pool stage comprised two-legged fixtures between states. As a result, matches in rounds five to seven of the pool stage were worth double points, due to the single-leg format.

=== Point allocation ===
Points
W	WD	LD	L
3	2	1	0

Every match in the 2003 AHL needed an outright result. In the event of a draw, golden goal extra time was played out, and if the result was still a draw a penalty shoot-out was contested, with the winner receiving a bonus point.

== Results ==
=== Preliminary round ===
==== Pool ====
Pos	Team	Pld	W	WD	LD	L	GF	GA	GD	Pts	Qualification
1	(Queensland) QLD Scorchers	10	8	0	2	0	31	7	+24	35	Semi-finals
2	(New South Wales) NSWIS Arrows	11	7	1	0	3	23	12	+11	31	Semi-finals
3	(Australian Capital Territory) Canberra Strikers	11	6	1	2	2	36	16	+20	28	Semi-finals
4	(South Australia) Adelaide Suns	10	3	3	1	3	16	15	+1	24	Semi-finals
5	(Western Australia) WAIS Diamonds	11	4	1	1	5	26	22	+4	21	
6	(Victoria (state)) VIS Vipers	11	5	0	0	6	21	22	−1	18	
7	(Tasmania) Tassie Van Demons	11	3	1	1	6	14	22	−8	12	
8	(Northern Territory) Territory Pearls	11	0	0	0	11	6	57	−51	0	

Source: Clearing House
Rules for classification: 1) points; 2) head-to-head result; 3) goal difference; 4) matches won; 5) goals scored.

==== Fixtures ====
2 March 2002
15:00 (AEST)

QLD Scorchers (Queensland)	Cancelled	(South Australia) Adelaide Suns
	Report

Stadium:
State Hockey Centre, Brisbane

2 March 2002
15:00 (AEDT)

Tassie Van Demons (Tasmania)	4–1	(Western Australia) WAIS Diamonds
	Report

Stadium:
Tasmanian Hockey Centre, Hobart

2 March 2002
15:00 (AEDT)

VIS Vipers (Victoria (state))	1–2	(New South Wales) NSWIS Arrows
	Report

Stadium:
State Netball and Hockey Centre, Melbourne

2 March 2002
16:00 (AEDT)

Canberra Strikers (Australian Capital Territory)	7–2	(Northern Territory) Territory Pearls
	Report

Stadium:
National Hockey Centre, Canberra

3 March 2002
13:00 (AEDT)

Canberra Strikers (Australian Capital Territory)	12–2	(Northern Territory) Territory Pearls
	Report

Stadium:
National Hockey Centre, Canberra

3 March 2002
13:30 (AEDT)

Tassie Van Demons (Tasmania)	1–3	(Western Australia) WAIS Diamonds
	Report

Stadium:
Tasmanian Hockey Centre, Hobart

3 March 2002
15:00 (AEST)

QLD Scorchers (Queensland)	5–1	(South Australia) Adelaide Suns
	Report

Stadium:
State Hockey Centre, Brisbane

3 March 2002
15:00 (AEDT)

VIS Vipers (Victoria (state))	1–4	(New South Wales) NSWIS Arrows
	Report

Stadium:
State Netball and Hockey Centre, Melbourne

9 March 2002
13:00 (ACDT)

Adelaide Suns (South Australia)	1–1	(Western Australia) WAIS Diamonds
Militz 20'	Report	Smithson 42'
Penalties
	3–2

Stadium:
Pines Hockey Stadium, Adelaide

9 March 2002
14:00 (AEST)

QLD Scorchers (Queensland)	6–0	(Tasmania) Tassie Van Demons
	Report

Stadium:
State Hockey Centre, Brisbane

9 March 2002
16:00 (AEDT)

Canberra Strikers (Australian Capital Territory)	2–0	(Victoria (state)) VIS Vipers
	Report

Stadium:
National Hockey Centre, Canberra

9 March 2002
20:00 (ACST)

Territory Pearls (Northern Territory)	0–4	(New South Wales) NSWIS Arrows
	Report

Stadium:
Vodafone Hockey Centre, Darwin

10 March 2002
12:00 (AEST)

QLD Scorchers (Queensland)	2–0	(Tasmania) Tassie Van Demons
	Report

Stadium:
State Hockey Centre, Brisbane

10 March 2002
13:00 (ACDT)

Adelaide Suns (South Australia)	4–1	(Western Australia) WAIS Diamonds
	Report

Stadium:
Pines Hockey Stadium, Adelaide

10 March 2002
14:00 (AEDT)

Canberra Strikers (Australian Capital Territory)	1–2	(Victoria (state)) VIS Vipers
	Report

Stadium:
National Hockey Centre, Canberra

10 March 2002
18:00 (ACST)

Territory Pearls (Northern Territory)	0–2	(New South Wales) NSWIS Arrows
	Report

Stadium:
Vodafone Hockey Centre, Darwin

16 March 2002
13:00 (AEDT)

NSWIS Arrows (New South Wales)	2–3	(Australian Capital Territory) Canberra Strikers
	Report

Stadium:
Cooke Hockey Complex, Bathurst

16 March 2002
13:00 (ACDT)

Adelaide Suns (South Australia)	1–1	(Tasmania) Tassie Van Demons
Pickett 64'	Report	Carr 32'
Penalties
	3–1

Stadium:
Pines Hockey Stadium, Adelaide

16 March 2002
17:00 (AWST)

WAIS Diamonds (Western Australia)	1–3	(Queensland) QLD Scorchers
Smithson 65'	Report	Hudson 25', 43', 62'

Stadium:
Perth Hockey Stadium, Perth

16 March 2002
20:00 (ACST)

Territory Pearls (Northern Territory)	0–2	(Victoria (state)) VIS Vipers
	Report	Dobson 8'; Smith 40'

Stadium:
Vodafone Hockey Centre, Darwin

17 March 2002
13:00 (ACDT)

Adelaide Suns (South Australia)	1–1	(Tasmania) Tassie Van Demons
Callow 40'	Report	Langham-Pritchard 47'
Penalties
	1–3

Stadium:
Pines Hockey Stadium, Adelaide

17 March 2002
15:00 (AEDT)

NSWIS Arrows (New South Wales)	1–3	(Australian Capital Territory) Canberra Strikers
	Report

Stadium:
Cooke Hockey Complex, Bathurst

17 March 2002
15:00 (AWST)

WAIS Diamonds (Western Australia)	0–2	(Queensland) QLD Scorchers
	Report	Holmes 25'; Hudson 38'

Stadium:
Perth Hockey Stadium, Perth

17 March 2002
18:00 (ACST)

Territory Pearls (Northern Territory)	1–6	(Victoria (state)) VIS Vipers
Caden 28'	Report	Austin 10'; Dobson 17', 35', 68'; Smith 43'; Durajski 54'

Stadium:
Vodafone Hockey Centre, Darwin

23 March 2002
13:00 (AEST)

VIS Vipers (Victoria (state))	3–0	(South Australia) Adelaide Suns
	Report

Stadium:
State Netball and Hockey Centre, Melbourne

23 March 2002
13:00 (AEST)

NSWIS Arrows (New South Wales)	2–1 (a.e.t.)	(Queensland) QLD Scorchers
Morrison 25'; Tassell 75'	Report	Hudson 68'

Stadium:
Olympic Hockey Centre, Sydney

23 March 2002
15:00 (AEST)

Tassie Van Demons (Tasmania)	3–0	(Northern Territory) Territory Pearls
Langham 14'; White 20'; Paget 68'	Report

Stadium:
Tasmanian Hockey Centre, Hobart

23 March 2002
17:00 (AWST)

WAIS Diamonds (Western Australia)	1–0	(Australian Capital Territory) Canberra Strikers
Smithson 52'	Report

Stadium:
Perth Hockey Stadium, Perth

24 March 2002
12:00 (AEST)

Tassie Van Demons (Tasmania)	1–0	(Northern Territory) Territory Pearls
Langham-Pritchard 51'	Report

Stadium:
Tasmanian Hockey Centre, Hobart

24 March 2002
13:00 (AEST)

VIS Vipers (Victoria (state))	0–3	(South Australia) Adelaide Suns
	Report

Stadium:
State Netball and Hockey Centre, Melbourne

24 March 2002
15:00 (AEST)

NSWIS Arrows (New South Wales)	Unknown	(Queensland) QLD Scorchers
	Report

Stadium:
Olympic Hockey Centre, Sydney

24 March 2002
15:00 (AWST)

WAIS Diamonds (Western Australia)	2–2	(Australian Capital Territory) Canberra Strikers
Smithson 55'; Buswell 68'	Report	S. Taylor 9', 19'
Penalties
	3–2

Stadium:
Perth Hockey Stadium, Perth

8 April 2002
12:00 (ACST)

QLD Scorchers (Queensland)	5–1	(Victoria (state)) VIS Vipers
	Report

Stadium:
Pines Hockey Stadium, Adelaide

8 April 2002
14:00 (ACST)

Canberra Strikers (Australian Capital Territory)	2–0	(Tasmania) Tassie Van Demons
	Report

Stadium:
Pines Hockey Stadium, Adelaide

8 April 2002
16:00 (ACST)

Territory Pearls (Northern Territory)	1–12	(Western Australia) WAIS Diamonds
	Report

Stadium:
Pines Hockey Stadium, Adelaide

8 April 2002
18:00 (ACST)

NSWIS Arrows (New South Wales)	1–0	(South Australia) Adelaide Suns
	Report

Stadium:
Pines Hockey Stadium, Adelaide

9 April 2002
12:00 (ACST)

Tassie Van Demons (Tasmania)	2–4	(Victoria (state)) VIS Vipers
	Report

Stadium:
Pines Hockey Stadium, Adelaide

9 April 2002
14:00 (ACST)

QLD Scorchers (Queensland)	2–2	(Australian Capital Territory) Canberra Strikers
Holmes 14', 51'	Report	Powell 24'; Smyth 52'
Penalties
	3–4

Stadium:
Pines Hockey Stadium, Adelaide

9 April 2002
16:00 (ACST)

Adelaide Suns (South Australia)	3–0	(Northern Territory) Territory Pearls
	Report

Stadium:
Pines Hockey Stadium, Adelaide

9 April 2002
18:00 (ACST)

WAIS Diamonds (Western Australia)	2–3	(New South Wales) NSWIS Arrows
	Report

Stadium:
Pines Hockey Stadium, Adelaide

11 April 2002
10:00 (ACST)

NSWIS Arrows (New South Wales)	2–1	(Tasmania) Tassie Van Demons
	Report

Stadium:
Pines Hockey Stadium, Adelaide

11 April 2002
12:00 (ACST)

QLD Scorchers (Queensland)	5–0	(Northern Territory) Territory Pearls
	Report

Stadium:
Pines Hockey Stadium, Adelaide

11 April 2002
14:00 (ACST)

VIS Vipers (Victoria (state))	1–2	(Western Australia) WAIS Diamonds
	Report

Stadium:
Pines Hockey Stadium, Adelaide

11 April 2002
16:00 (ACST)

Adelaide Suns (South Australia)	2–2	(Australian Capital Territory) Canberra Strikers
Bakurski 49'; Mitchell-Taverner 67'	Report	Jennings 33'; Paterson 38'
Penalties
	3–0

Stadium:
Pines Hockey Stadium, Adelaide

=== Classification round ===
==== Fifth to eighth place classification ====
Crossover
13 April 2002
(Western Australia) WAIS Diamonds	2
(Northern Territory) Territory Pearls	1
13 April 2002
(Victoria (state)) VIS Vipers	3
(Tasmania) Tassie Van Demons	0

Fifth place
14 April 2002
(Western Australia) WAIS Diamonds	3
(Victoria (state)) VIS Vipers	2
Seventh place
14 April 2002
(Northern Territory) Territory Pearls	0
(Tasmania) Tassie Van Demons	5

===== Crossover =====
13 April 2002
08:00 (ACST)

WAIS Diamonds (Western Australia)	2–1	(Northern Territory) Territory Pearls
Liddelow 28'; Napier 52'	Report	Ainslie 12'

Stadium:
Pines Hockey Stadium, Adelaide

13 April 2002
10:00 (ACST)

VIS Vipers (Victoria (state))	3–0	(Tasmania) Tassie Van Demons
Durajski 47'; Bazeley 52'; Purcell 64'	Report

Stadium:
Pines Hockey Stadium, Adelaide

===== Seventh and eighth place =====
14 April 2002
09:00 (ACST)

Territory Pearls (Northern Territory)	0–5	(Tasmania) Tassie Van Demons
	Report	Langham-Pritchard 9', 13'; Paget 33'; Pickup 40'; Langham 49'

Stadium:
Pines Hockey Stadium, Adelaide

===== Fifth and sixth place =====
14 April 2002
11:00 (ACST)

WAIS Diamonds (Western Australia)	3–2	(Victoria (state)) VIS Vipers
Smithson 5'; Halliday 9'; Napier 54'	Report	Johnston 9'; Durajski 30'

Stadium:
Pines Hockey Stadium, Adelaide

==== First to fourth place classification ====
Semi-finals
13 April 2002
(Queensland) QLD Scorchers	3
(South Australia) Adelaide Suns	2
13 April 2002
(New South Wales) NSWIS Arrows (a.e.t)	2
(Australian Capital Territory) Canberra Strikers	1

Final
14 April 2002
(Queensland) QLD Scorchers	2
(New South Wales) NSWIS Arrows	4
Third place
14 April 2002
(South Australia) Adelaide Suns	2
(Australian Capital Territory) Canberra Strikers	3

===== Semi-finals =====
13 April 2002
12:00 (ACST)

QLD Scorchers (Queensland)	3–2	(South Australia) Adelaide Suns
Holmes 2'; Hudson 11'; Willems 37'	Report	Callow 13'; Mitchell-Taverner 32'

Stadium:
Pines Hockey Stadium, Adelaide

13 April 2002
14:00 (ACST)

NSWIS Arrows (New South Wales)	2–1 (a.e.t.)	(Australian Capital Territory) Canberra Strikers
Morrison 14'; Banning 77'	Report	Powell 45'

Stadium:
Pines Hockey Stadium, Adelaide

===== Third and fourth place =====
14 April 2002
13:00 (ACST)

Adelaide Suns (South Australia)	2–3	(Australian Capital Territory) Canberra Strikers
Militz 38'; Callow 51'	Report	Staunton 5'; Arrold 32'; Smyth 34'

Stadium:
Pines Hockey Stadium, Adelaide

===== Final =====
14 April 2002
15:00 (ACST)

QLD Scorchers (Queensland)	2–4	(New South Wales) NSWIS Arrows
Korner 48'; Hudson 62'	Report	Morrison 4', 53'; Banning 34'; Richardson 59'

Stadium:
Pines Hockey Stadium, Adelaide
