= 2000 Women's Australian Hockey League =

Tournament details
- Host country: Australia
- City: Sydney
- Dates: 7–19 March
- Teams: 8
- Venue: State Hockey Centre

Final positions
- Champions: (New South Wales) NSWIS Arrows (5th title)
- Runner-up: (Queensland) QAS Scorchers
- Third place: (Australian Capital Territory) ACT Strikers

Tournament statistics
- Matches played: 36
- Goals scored: 166 (4.61 per match)
- Top scorer: (Australian Capital Territory) Katrina Powell (13 goals)
- Best player: (Australian Capital Territory) Katrina Powell

The 2000 Women's Australian Hockey League (AHL) was the 8th edition women's field hockey tournament. The tournament was held in Sydney, and was contested from 7–19 March 2000.

NSWIS Arrows won the tournament for the fifth time after defeating QAS Scorchers 2–1 in extra-time, after the final finished as a 1–1 draw. ACT Strikers finished in third place after defeating WAIS Diamonds 4–2 in the third and fourth place playoff.

== Participating teams ==
- (Australian Capital Territory) ACT Strikers
- (New South Wales) NSWIS Arrows
- (Northern Territory) Territory Pearls
- (Queensland) QAS Scorchers
- (South Australia) Adelaide Suns
- (Tasmania) Tassie Van Demons
- (Victoria (state)) VIS Vipers
- (Western Australia) WAIS Diamonds

== Competition format ==
The 2000 Women's Australian Hockey League consisted of a single round robin format, followed by classification matches.

Teams from all 8 states and territories competed against one another throughout the pool stage. At the conclusion of the pool stage, the top four ranked teams progressed to the semi-finals, while the bottom four teams continued to the classification stage.

=== Point allocation ===
Points
W	WD	LD	L
3	2	1	0

Every match in the 2000 AHL needed an outright result. In the event of a draw, golden goal extra time was played out, and if the result was still a draw a penalty shoot-out was contested, with the winner receiving a bonus point.

== Results ==
All times are local (UTC+10:00).

=== Preliminary round ===
==== Pool ====
Pos	Team	Pld	W	WD	LD	L	GF	GA	GD	Pts	Qualification
1	(Queensland) QAS Scorchers	7	6	0	0	1	25	5	+20	18	Semi-finals
2	(Australian Capital Territory) ACT Strikers	7	5	1	0	1	26	11	+15	17	Semi-finals
3	(New South Wales) NSWIS Arrows	7	5	0	0	2	23	11	+12	15	Semi-finals
4	(Western Australia) WAIS Diamonds	7	4	0	0	3	22	14	+8	12	Semi-finals
5	(Tasmania) Tassie Van Demons	7	2	1	0	4	14	14	0	8	
6	(South Australia) Adelaide Suns	7	2	0	1	4	14	14	0	7	
7	(Victoria (state)) VIS Vipers	7	1	1	2	3	11	19	−8	7	
8	(Northern Territory) Territory Pearls	7	0	0	0	7	3	50	−47	0	

Source: Hockey NSW
Rules for classification: 1) points; 2) goal difference; 3) head-to-head result; 4) matches won; 5) goals scored.

==== Fixtures ====
7 March 2000
14:00

QAS Scorchers (Queensland)	4–0	(South Australia) Adelaide Suns
Skirving 30'; Hudson 43'; Smith 61'; Free 66'	Report

Stadium:
State Hockey Centre

7 March 2000
16:00

Tassie Van Demons (Tasmania)	1–0 (a.e.t.)	(Victoria (state)) VIS Vipers
B. Langham 84'	Report

Stadium:
State Hockey Centre

7 March 2000
18:00

NSWIS Arrows (New South Wales)	2–3	(Australian Capital Territory) ACT Strikers
Banning 42'; Morrison 52'	Report	Gallagher 9'; Staunton 16'; S. Taylor 54'

Stadium:
State Hockey Centre

7 March 2000
20:00

WAIS Diamonds (Western Australia)	9–1	(Northern Territory) Territory Pearls
Hawkes 3', 28', 53'; Ringrose 14'; Young 25'; Andrews 32', 44', 68'; Halliday 66'	Report	Godfrey 56'

Stadium:
State Hockey Centre

8 March 2000
14:00

VIS Vipers (Victoria (state))	0–0	(South Australia) Adelaide Suns
	Report
Penalties
	2–0

Stadium:
State Hockey Centre

8 March 2000
16:00

Tassie Van Demons (Tasmania)	0–3	(Queensland) QAS Scorchers
	Report	Callow 18'; Donnelly 27'; Free 33'

Stadium:
State Hockey Centre

8 March 2000
18:00

NSWIS Arrows (New South Wales)	8–0	(Northern Territory) Territory Pearls
Sargeant 1', 38'; Freedman 2', 39'; Morrison 5'; Needham 34'; J. Towers 42'; Banning 60'	Report

Stadium:
State Hockey Centre

8 March 2000
20:00

ACT Strikers (Australian Capital Territory)	2–3	(Western Australia) WAIS Diamonds
Paterson 39'; Staunton 42'	Report	Andrews 42'; Ringrose 62'; Hawkes 65'

Stadium:
State Hockey Centre

9 March 2000
14:00

VIS Vipers (Victoria (state))	0–4	(Queensland) QAS Scorchers
	Report	Hudson 3'; Faulkner 28'; Morris 53'; Donnelly 59'

Stadium:
State Hockey Centre

9 March 2000
16:00

Adelaide Suns (South Australia)	1–2	(Tasmania) Tassie Van Demons
Jackson 13'	Report	Walker 21', 39'

Stadium:
State Hockey Centre

9 March 2000
18:00

Territory Pearls (Northern Territory)	0–5	(Australian Capital Territory) ACT Strikers
	Report	Powell 2', 7', 41'; Paterson 39'; S. Taylor 54'

Stadium:
State Hockey Centre

9 March 2000
20:00

WAIS Diamonds (Western Australia)	1–3	(New South Wales) NSWIS Arrows
Winter 51'	Report	K. Towers 26'; Annan 45'; J. Towers 66'

Stadium:
State Hockey Centre

11 March 2000
10:00

WAIS Diamonds (Western Australia)	4–2	(Tasmania) Tassie Van Demons
Andrews 17'; Dalby 22'; Young 31'; Ringrose 57'	Report	M. Langham 46', 55'

Stadium:
State Hockey Centre

11 March 2000
12:00

Adelaide Suns (South Australia)	0–5	(Australian Capital Territory) ACT Strikers
	Report	Powell 3', 38'; S. Taylor 31'; Staunton 46'; Gallagher 61'

Stadium:
State Hockey Centre

11 March 2000
14:00

VIS Vipers (Victoria (state))	2–4	(New South Wales) NSWIS Arrows
Smith 63'; Mitchell-Taverner 70'	Report	J. Towers 3'; Annan 39'; Tassell 47', 69'

Stadium:
State Hockey Centre

11 March 2000
16:00

QAS Scorchers (Queensland)	6–0	(Northern Territory) Territory Pearls
Hudson 33', 67'; Smith 41'; Morris 53', 55'; Free 67'	Report

Stadium:
State Hockey Centre

12 March 2000
10:00

ACT Strikers (Australian Capital Territory)	2–0	(Tasmania) Tassie Van Demons
Powell 43'; Jennings 70'	Report

Stadium:
State Hockey Centre

12 March 2000
12:00

Adelaide Suns (South Australia)	3–1	(Western Australia) WAIS Diamonds
Haslam 29', 52'; Peek 53'	Report	Andrews 32'

Stadium:
State Hockey Centre

12 March 2000
14:00

Territory Pearls (Northern Territory)	2–4	(Victoria (state)) VIS Vipers
Colgan 22'; Godfrey 42'	Report	Spalding 13'; Dobson 28', 41'; Mitchell-Taverner 57'

Stadium:
State Hockey Centre

12 March 2000
16:00

QAS Scorchers (Queensland)	4–0	(New South Wales) NSWIS Arrows
Hudson 10', 45'; Cole 14'; Morris 25'	Report

Stadium:
State Hockey Centre

14 March 2000
14:00

NSWIS Arrows (New South Wales)	4–1	(Tasmania) Tassie Van Demons
Annan 7'; K. Towers 17'; Morrison 46'; Needham 55'	Report	Eadie 32'

Stadium:
State Hockey Centre

14 March 2000
16:00

Territory Pearls (Northern Territory)	0–10	(South Australia) Adelaide Suns
	Report	Militz 8', 27'; Haslam 13'; Jackson 22'; Pickett 32'; Wood 39', 56'; Marles 45', 69', 70'

Stadium:
State Hockey Centre

14 March 2000
18:00

WAIS Diamonds (Western Australia)	3–1	(Victoria (state)) VIS Vipers
Andrews 12'; Ramshaw 21'; Ringrose 64'	Report	Dobson 34'

Stadium:
State Hockey Centre

14 March 2000
20:00

ACT Strikers (Australian Capital Territory)	4–2	(Queensland) QAS Scorchers
Jennings 8'; Powell 29'; MacKinnon 42'; S. Taylor 69'	Report	Morris 10'; Free 39'

Stadium:
State Hockey Centre

15 March 2000
14:00

Tassie Van Demons (Tasmania)	8–0	(Northern Territory) Territory Pearls
Carr 8'; M. Langham 14'; Wallington 20'; Turner 23'; McDonald 34'; B. Langham 44'; White 45', 50'	Report

Stadium:
State Hockey Centre

15 March 2000
16:00

NSWIS Arrows (New South Wales)	2–0	(South Australia) Adelaide Suns
Morrison 39'; Banning 70'	Report

Stadium:
State Hockey Centre

15 March 2000
18:00

QAS Scorchers (Queensland)	2–1	(Western Australia) WAIS Diamonds
Smith 24'; Hudson 32'	Report	Ringrose 68'

Stadium:
State Hockey Centre

15 March 2000
20:00

ACT Strikers (Australian Capital Territory)	5–4 (a.e.t.)	(Victoria (state)) VIS Vipers
Powell 3', 56', 74'; Bankovsky 16'; Gallagher 69'	Report	Mitchell-Taverner 14'; Smith 39'; Purcell 49'; Gillon 68'

Stadium:
State Hockey Centre

=== Classification round ===
==== Fifth to eighth place classification ====
Crossover
17 March 2000
(Tasmania) Tassie Van Demons	2
(Northern Territory) Territory Pearls	0
17 March 2000
(South Australia) Adelaide Suns	1
(Victoria (state)) VIS Vipers	3

Fifth place
19 March 2000
(Tasmania) Tassie Van Demons	2
(Victoria (state)) VIS Vipers	1
Seventh place
19 March 2000
(Northern Territory) Territory Pearls	0
(South Australia) Adelaide Suns	3

===== Crossover =====
17 March 2000
14:00

Tassie Van Demons (Tasmania)	2–0	(Northern Territory) Territory Pearls
B. Langham 9'; Wallington 53'	Report

Stadium:
State Hockey Centre

17 March 2000
16:00

Adelaide Suns (South Australia)	1–3	(Victoria (state)) VIS Vipers
Wood 53'	Report	B. Imison 17', 19'; Smith 31'

Stadium:
State Hockey Centre

===== Seventh and eighth place =====
19 March 2000
08:00

Territory Pearls (Northern Territory)	0–3	(South Australia) Adelaide Suns
	Report	Wood 37'; Haslam 42', 43'

Stadium:
State Hockey Centre

===== Fifth and sixth place =====
19 March 2000
10:00

Tassie Van Demons (Tasmania)	2–1	(Victoria (state)) VIS Vipers
Carr 15'; Wallington 46'	Report	Smith 44'

Stadium:
State Hockey Centre

==== First to fourth place classification ====
Semi-finals
17 March 2000
(Queensland) QAS Scorchers	2
(Western Australia) WAIS Diamonds	0
17 March 2000
(Australian Capital Territory) ACT Strikers	1
(New South Wales) NSWIS Arrows	4

Final
19 March 2000
(Queensland) QAS Scorchers	1
(New South Wales) NSWIS Arrows (a.e.t)	2
Third place
19 March 2000
(Western Australia) WAIS Diamonds	2
(Australian Capital Territory) ACT Strikers	4

===== Semi-finals =====
17 March 2000
18:00

QLD Scorchers (Queensland)	2–0	(Western Australia) WAIS Diamonds
Free 8'; Callow 43'	Report

Stadium:
State Hockey Centre

17 March 2000
20:00

ACT Strikers (Australian Capital Territory)	1–4	(New South Wales) NSWIS Arrows
Powell 2'	Report	K. Towers 4', 64'; J. Towers 21'; Annan 49'

Stadium:
State Hockey Centre

===== Third and fourth place =====
19 March 2000
12:00

WAIS Diamonds (Western Australia)	2–4	(Australian Capital Territory) ACT Strikers
Andrews 14', 48'	Report	Powell 15', 27'; Carruthers 40'; S. Taylor 52'

Stadium:
State Hockey Centre

===== Final =====
19 March 2000
14:00

QLD Scorchers (Queensland)	1–2 (a.e.t.)	(New South Wales) NSWIS Arrows
Hudson 53'	Report	J. Towers 2'; Annan 80'

Stadium:
State Hockey Centre

== Awards ==
Player of the Tournament	Top Goalscorer	Goalkeeper of the Tournament	Player of the Final
(Australian Capital Territory) Katrina Powell	(Australian Capital Territory) Katrina Powell	(Victoria (state)) Rachel Imison	(Queensland) Karen Smith

== Statistics ==
=== Final standings ===
Pos	Team	Pld	W	WD	LD	L	GF	GA	GD	Pts	Qualification
1st place, gold medalist(s)	(New South Wales) NSWIS Arrows	9	6	1	0	2	29	13	+16	20	Gold Medal
2nd place, silver medalist(s)	(Queensland) QAS Scorchers	9	7	0	1	1	28	7	+21	22	Silver Medal
3rd place, bronze medalist(s)	(Australian Capital Territory) ACT Strikers	9	6	1	0	2	31	17	+14	20	Bronze Medal
4	(Western Australia) WAIS Diamonds	9	4	0	0	5	24	20	+4	12	
5	(Tasmania) Tassie Van Demons	9	4	1	0	4	18	15	+3	14	
6	(Victoria (state)) VIS Vipers	9	2	1	2	4	15	22	−7	10	
7	(South Australia) Adelaide Suns	9	3	0	1	5	18	17	+1	10	
8	(Northern Territory) Territory Pearls	9	0	0	0	9	3	55	−52	0	

Source: Hockey NSW

=== Goalscorers ===
There were 166 goals scored in 36 matches, for an average of 4.61 goals per match.

13 goals

- (Australian Capital Territory) Katrina Powell

9 goals

- (Western Australia) Michelle Andrews

8 goals

- (Queensland) Nicole Hudson

5 goals

- (Australian Capital Territory) Sarah Taylor
- (New South Wales) Alyson Annan
- (New South Wales) Julie Towers
- (Queensland) Kelly Free
- (Queensland) Jenn Morris
- (South Australia) Juliet Haslam
- (Western Australia) Candice Ringrose

4 goals

- (New South Wales) Brooke Morrison
- (New South Wales) Kristen Towers
- (South Australia) Kate Wood
- (Victoria (state)) Ngaire Smith
- (Western Australia) Rechelle Hawkes

3 goals

- (Australian Capital Territory) Peta Gallagher
- (Australian Capital Territory) Tonina Staunton
- (New South Wales) Joanne Banning
- (Queensland) Karen Smith
- (South Australia) Mignon Marles
- (Tasmania) Bianca Langham
- (Tasmania) Marcelle Langham
- (Tasmania) Simone Wallington
- (Victoria (state)) Louise Dobson
- (Victoria (state)) Claire Mitchell-Taverner

2 goals

- (Australian Capital Territory) Denise Jennings
- (Australian Capital Territory) Katrina Paterson
- (New South Wales) Sarah Freedman
- (New South Wales) Kelly Needham
- (New South Wales) Megan Sargeant
- (New South Wales) Wendy Tassell
- (Northern Territory) Lisa Godfrey
- (Queensland) Anne-Marie Callow
- (Queensland) Patrice Donnelly
- (South Australia) Ashleigh Jackson
- (South Australia) Rachel Militz
- (Tasmania) Ilene Carr
- (Tasmania) Kimberley Walker
- (Tasmania) Lottie White
- (Victoria (state)) Bethany Imison
- (Western Australia) Fiona Young

1 goal

- (Australian Capital Territory) Miriam Bankovsky
- (Australian Capital Territory) Lisa Carruthers
- (Australian Capital Territory) Kate MacKinnon
- (Northern Territory) Kellie Colgan
- (Queensland) Tammy Cole
- (Queensland) Suzanne Faulkner
- (Queensland) Angela Skirving
- (South Australia) Alison Peek
- (South Australia) Bronte Pickett
- (Tasmania) Deborah Eadie
- (Tasmania) Vanessa McDonald
- (Tasmania) Natalie Turner
- (Victoria (state)) Amanda Gillon
- (Victoria (state)) Lisa Purcell
- (Victoria (state)) Shellee Spalding
- (Western Australia) Nicole Dalby
- (Western Australia) Emily Halliday
- (Western Australia) Rachel Ramshaw
- (Western Australia) Sharon Winter
