= 2003 Women's Australian Hockey League =

Tournament details
- Host country: Australia
- Dates: 7 March – 13 April
- Teams: 8
- Venue: 11 (in 11 host cities)

Final positions
- Champions: (Victoria (state)) VIS Vipers (1st title)
- Runner-up: (Queensland) QLD Scorchers
- Third place: (Australian Capital Territory) Canberra Strikers

Tournament statistics
- Matches played: 56
- Goals scored: 221 (3.95 per match)
- Top scorer: (Australian Capital Territory) Katrina Powell (17 goals)
- Best player: (South Australia) Carmel Bakurski

The 2003 Women's Australian Hockey League was the 11th edition women's field hockey tournament. The tournament was held in various cities across Australia, and was contested from 7 March through to 13 April 2003.

VIS Vipers won the tournament for the first time after defeating QLD Scorchers 4–3 in penalties, after the final finished as a 3–3 draw. Canberra Strikers finished in third place after defeating WA Diamonds 4–3 in the third and fourth place playoff.

== Participating teams ==
- (Australian Capital Territory) Canberra Strikers
- (New South Wales) NSWIS Arrows
- (Northern Territory) Territory Pearls
- (Queensland) QLD Scorchers
- (South Australia) Adelaide Suns
- (Tasmania) Tassie Van Demons
- (Victoria (state)) VIS Vipers
- (Western Australia) WA Diamonds

== Competition format ==
The 2003 Women's Australian Hockey League consisted of a single round robin format, followed by classification matches.

Teams from all 8 states and territories competed against one another throughout the pool stage. At the conclusion of the pool stage, the top four ranked teams progressed to the semi-finals, while the bottom four teams continued to the classification stage.

The first four rounds of the pool stage comprised two-legged fixtures between states. As a result, matches in rounds five to seven of the pool stage were worth double points, due to the single-leg format.

=== Point allocation ===
Points
W	WD	LD	L
3	2	1	0

Every match in the 2003 AHL needed an outright result. In the event of a draw, golden goal extra time was played out, and if the result was still a draw a penalty shoot-out was contested, with the winner receiving a bonus point.

== Results ==
=== Preliminary round ===
Pos	Team	Pld	W	WD	LD	L	GF	GA	GD	Pts	Qualification
1	(Queensland) QLD Scorchers	11	8	2	0	1	39	17	+22	36	Semi-finals
2	(Australian Capital Territory) Canberra Strikers	11	8	2	1	0	34	13	+21	36	Semi-finals
3	(Victoria (state)) VIS Vipers	11	8	0	1	2	30	16	+14	31	Semi-finals
4	(Western Australia) WA Diamonds	11	6	1	0	4	23	20	+3	26	Semi-finals
5	(New South Wales) NSWIS Arrows	11	4	0	3	4	18	20	−2	18	
6	(South Australia) Adelaide Suns	11	3	0	0	8	16	29	−13	12	
7	(Tasmania) Tassie Van Demons	11	1	1	1	8	15	32	−17	9	
8	(Northern Territory) Territory Pearls	11	0	0	0	11	13	41	−28	0	

Source: Clearing House
Rules for classification: 1) points; 2) head-to-head result; 3) goal difference; 4) matches won; 5) goals scored.

==== Fixtures ====
7 March 2003
18:00 (ACST)

Territory Pearls (Northern Territory)	2–4	(Queensland) QLD Scorchers
Bain 50'; Bennett 56'	Report	Faulkner 3', 15', 62'; Willims 66'

Stadium:
Vodadone Hockey Centre, Darwin

8 March 2003
13:00 (ACDT)

Adelaide Suns (South Australia)	1–4	(Victoria (state)) VIS Vipers
Patrick 67'	Report	Dobson 49', 63'; Monkivitch 65'; Towers 68'

Stadium:
Pines Hockey Stadium, Adelaide

8 March 2003
15:00 (AEDT)

NSWIS Arrows (New South Wales)	2–3 (a.e.t.)	(Australian Capital Territory) Canberra Strikers
Rivers 10'; Sargeant 32'	Report	Powell 1', 74'; Arrold 12'

Stadium:
Lithgow Hockey Stadium, Lithgow

8 March 2003
17:00 (AWST)

WA Diamonds (Western Australia)	4–0	(Tasmania) Tassie Van Demons
Dalby 10'; Kaufmann 54', 69'; Napier 59'	Report

Stadium:
Perth Hockey Stadium, Perth

8 March 2003
20:00 (ACST)

Territory Pearls (Northern Territory)	1–5	(Queensland) QLD Scorchers
Bain 65'	Report	Paterson 17'; Cole 28'; Hudson 33', 51'; Smith 45'

Stadium:
Vodadone Hockey Centre, Darwin

9 March 2003
13:00 (AEDT)

NSWIS Arrows (New South Wales)	1–2	(Australian Capital Territory) Canberra Strikers
White-Muik 15'	Report	Nightingale 17'; Arrold 60'

Stadium:
Lithgow Hockey Stadium, Lithgow

9 March 2003
13:00 (ACDT)

Adelaide Suns (South Australia)	1–2	(Victoria (state)) VIS Vipers
Militz 54'	Report	Harvey 13'; Eastman 28'

Stadium:
Pines Hockey Stadium, Adelaide

9 March 2003
15:00 (AWST)

WA Diamonds (Western Australia)	3–2 (a.e.t.)	(Tasmania) Tassie Van Demons
Dalby 41'; Napier 43'; Halliday 80'	Report	Paget 16'; Judge 24'

Stadium:
Perth Hockey Stadium, Perth

14 March 2003
18:00 (AWST)

WA Diamonds (Western Australia)	2–1	(Northern Territory) Territory Pearls
Halliday 45'; Dalby 68'	Report	Bunce 14'

Stadium:
Perth Hockey Stadium, Perth

15 March 2003
13:00 (AEDT)

VIS Vipers (Victoria (state))	0–1 (a.e.t.)	(Australian Capital Territory) Canberra Strikers
	Report	Powell 74'

Stadium:
Albury Hockey Centre, Albury

15 March 2003
13:30 (AEDT)

Tassie Van Demons (Tasmania)	0–2	(South Australia) Adelaide Suns
	Report	Souter 35'; Bakurski 49'

Stadium:
Tasmanian Hockey Centre, Hobart

15 March 2003
16:00 (AEST)

QLD Scorchers (Queensland)	5–0	(New South Wales) NSWIS Arrows
Allen 28'; Willims 32'; Faulkner 47', 69'; Holmes 55'	Report

Stadium:
Queensland State Hockey Centre, Brisbane

15 March 2003
18:00 (AWST)

WA Diamonds (Western Australia)	3–2	(Northern Territory) Territory Pearls
Dalby 25'; Liddelow 27'; Napier 60'	Report	Bain 13', 38'

Stadium:
Perth Hockey Stadium, Perth

16 March 2003
11:30 (AEDT)

Tassie Van Demons (Tasmania)	0–3	(South Australia) Adelaide Suns
	Report	Bakurski 2', 63'; Marles 6'

Stadium:
Tasmanian Hockey Centre, Hobart

16 March 2003
13:00 (AEDT)

VIS Vipers (Victoria (state))	1–3	(Australian Capital Territory) Canberra Strikers
Dobson 57'	Report	Taylor 20'; Jennings 24'; Rayner 49'

Stadium:
Albury Hockey Centre, Albury

16 March 2003
14:00 (AEST)

QLD Scorchers (Queensland)	2–1 (a.e.t.)	(New South Wales) NSWIS Arrows
Hudson 10', 82'	Report	Sargeant 15'

Stadium:
Queensland State Hockey Centre, Brisbane

22 March 2003
13:00 (AEDT)

VIS Vipers (Victoria (state))	5–1	(Northern Territory) Territory Pearls
Towers 10'; Johnston 26', 69'; Dobson 30'; Smith 37'	Report	Kozak 52'

Stadium:
State Netball & Hockey Centre, Melbourne

22 March 2003
13:00 (AEDT)

NSWIS Arrows (New South Wales)	1–2 (a.e.t.)	(Tasmania) Tassie Van Demons
James 10'	Report	Pickup 67'; Judge 78'

Stadium:
International Hockey Complex, Newcastle

22 March 2003
14:00 (AEDT)

Canberra Strikers (Australian Capital Territory)	4–0	(South Australia) Adelaide Suns
Powell 6', 13'; Arrold 46'; Roberts 46'	Report

Stadium:
National Hockey Centre, Canberra

22 March 2003
16:00 (AEST)

QLD Scorchers (Queensland)	2–0	(Western Australia) WA Diamonds
Faulkner 47'; Hudson 64'	Report

Stadium:
Queensland State Hockey Centre, Brisbane

23 March 2003
11:30 (AEDT)

NSWIS Arrows (New South Wales)	5–1	(Tasmania) Tassie Van Demons
Rivers 20', 22', 36'; Netzler 28'; Banning 57'	Report	Clement 5'

Stadium:
International Hockey Complex, Newcastle

23 March 2003
12:30 (AEDT)

Canberra Strikers (Australian Capital Territory)	4–1	(South Australia) Adelaide Suns
Gallagher 15', 15'; Nightingale 58'; Powell 60'	Report	Callow 67'

Stadium:
National Hockey Centre, Canberra

23 March 2003
13:00 (AEDT)

VIS Vipers (Victoria (state))	3–2	(Northern Territory) Territory Pearls
Dobson 26'; Towers 32'; Brazenor 59'	Report	Kozak 2'; Caden 59'

Stadium:
State Netball & Hockey Centre, Melbourne

23 March 2003
13:00 (AEST)

QLD Scorchers (Queensland)	1–2	(Western Australia) WA Diamonds
Hudson 46'	Report	Liddelow 3'; Walker 39'

Stadium:
Queensland State Hockey Centre, Brisbane

28 March 2003
19:30 (ACST)

Territory Pearls (Northern Territory)	1–4	(New South Wales) NSWIS Arrows
Bain 48'	Report	Harris 18', 34', 69'; Rivers 50'

Stadium:
Alice Springs Hockey Association, Alice Springs

29 March 2003
15:00 (AEDT)

Tassie Van Demons (Tasmania)	1–4	(Victoria (state)) VIS Vipers
Pickup 57'	Report	Harvey 21'; Towers 30', 33'; Johnston 67'

Stadium:
Tasmanian Hockey Centre, Hobart

29 March 2003
16:00 (AEDT)

Canberra Strikers (Australian Capital Territory)	2–0	(Western Australia) WA Diamonds
Taylor 20'; Powell 66'	Report

Stadium:
National Hockey Centre, Canberra

29 March 2003
18:00 (ACDT)

Adelaide Suns (South Australia)	2–4	(Queensland) QLD Scorchers
Callow 36', 60'	Report	Pamenter 25'; Allen 32'; Brown 57'; Hudson 63'

Stadium:
Pines Hockey Stadium, Adelaide

29 March 2003
19:30 (ACST)

Territory Pearls (Northern Territory)	0–2	(New South Wales) NSWIS Arrows
	Report	Rivers 17'; Netzler 60'

Stadium:
Alice Springs Hockey Association, Alice Springs

30 March 2003
14:00 (AEST)

Tassie Van Demons (Tasmania)	0–2	(Victoria (state)) VIS Vipers
	Report	Stanford 33'; Johnston 44'

Stadium:
Tasmanian Hockey Centre, Hobart

30 March 2003
14:00 (ACST)

Adelaide Suns (South Australia)	2–4	(Queensland) QLD Scorchers
Patrick 33'; Bakurski 60'	Report	Faulkner 1'; Allen 20'; Hudson 46'; Holmes 65'

Stadium:
Pines Hockey Stadium, Adelaide

30 March 2003
14:30 (AEST)

Canberra Strikers (Australian Capital Territory)	3–1	(Western Australia) WA Diamonds
Powell 12'; Taylor 31'; Jennings 39'	Report	Napier 35'

Stadium:
National Hockey Centre, Canberra

7 April 2003
12:00 (AEST)

NSWIS Arrows (New South Wales)	1–0	(South Australia) Adelaide Suns
James 54'	Report

Stadium:
Tasmanian Hockey Centre, Hobart

7 April 2003
14:00 (AEST)

VIS Vipers (Victoria (state))	5–2	(Western Australia) WA Diamonds
Towers 7', 15'; Grunden 28'; Trost 32'; Brazenor 42'	Report	Liddelow 39'; Calton 68'

Stadium:
Tasmanian Hockey Centre, Hobart

7 April 2003
18:00 (AEST)

Tassie Van Demons (Tasmania)	2–4	(Queensland) QLD Scorchers
McLeod 38'; Judge 60'	Report	Smith 7', 63'; Allen 26'; Skirving 70'

Stadium:
Tasmanian Hockey Centre, Hobart

7 April 2003
20:00 (AEST)

Canberra Strikers (Australian Capital Territory)	5–1	(Northern Territory) Territory Pearls
Powell 20', 22', 52'; Gallagher 33', 55'	Report	Smith 41'

Stadium:
Tasmanian Hockey Centre, Hobart

8 April 2003
14:00 (AEST)

NSWIS Arrows (New South Wales)	0–2	(Victoria (state)) VIS Vipers
	Report	Towers 5'; Johnston 68'

Stadium:
Tasmanian Hockey Centre, Hobart

8 April 2003
16:00 (AEST)

WA Diamonds (Western Australia)	4–1	(South Australia) Adelaide Suns
Dalby 28', 63'; Hammond 45'; Young 60'	Report	Handley 50'

Stadium:
Tasmanian Hockey Centre, Hobart

8 April 2003
18:00 (AEST)

QLD Scorchers (Queensland)	4–3 (a.e.t.)	(Australian Capital Territory) Canberra Strikers
Holmes 17'; Pamenter 33'; Paterson 41'; Faulkner 76'	Report	Nightingale 35'; Gallagher 46'; Powell 63'

Stadium:
Tasmanian Hockey Centre, Hobart

8 April 2003
20:00 (AEST)

Tassie Van Demons (Tasmania)	5–0	(Northern Territory) Territory Pearls
Clement 29', 40'; Judge 33', 62'; McLeod 37'	Report

Stadium:
Tasmanian Hockey Centre, Hobart

10 April 2003
10:00 (AEST)

Territory Pearls (Northern Territory)	2–3	(South Australia) Adelaide Suns
Markey 56'; Smith 69'	Report	Callow 31', 65'; Bakurski 66'

Stadium:
Tasmanian Hockey Centre, Hobart

10 April 2003
12:00 (AEST)

VIS Vipers (Victoria (state))	2–4	(Queensland) QLD Scorchers
Towers 12', 21'	Report	Cole 18'; Hudson 26', 69'; Holmes 46'

Stadium:
Tasmanian Hockey Centre, Hobart

10 April 2003
14:00 (AEST)

Tassie Van Demons (Tasmania)	2–4	(Australian Capital Territory) Canberra Strikers
Clement 5'; Judge 45'	Report	Gallagher 2'; Powell 14', 57', 64'

Stadium:
Tasmanian Hockey Centre, Hobart

10 April 2003
16:00 (AEST)

NSWIS Arrows (New South Wales)	1–2	(Western Australia) WA Diamonds
Sargeant 51'	Report	Dalby 21'; Kaufmann 39'

Stadium:
Tasmanian Hockey Centre, Hobart

=== Classification round ===
==== Fifth to eighth place classification ====
Crossover
12 April 2003
(New South Wales) NSWIS Arrows	4
(Northern Territory) Territory Pearls	1
12 April 2003
(South Australia) Adelaide Suns	4
(Tasmania) Tassie Van Demons	1

Fifth Place
13 April 2003
(New South Wales) NSWIS Arrows	2
(South Australia) Adelaide Suns	1
Seventh Place
13 April 2003
(Northern Territory) Territory Pearls	0
(Tasmania) Tassie Van Demons	3

===== Crossover =====
12 April 2003
08:30 (AEST)

NSWIS Arrows (New South Wales)	4–1	(Northern Territory) Territory Pearls
Sargeant 11'; Harris 16', 28', 38'	Report	Bell 25'

Stadium:
Tasmanian Hockey Centre

12 April 2003
10:30 (AEST)

Adelaide Suns (South Australia)	4–1	(Tasmania) Tassie Van Demons
Bakurski 6'; Marles 33', 70'; Patrick 52'	Report	Colrain 29'

Stadium:
Tasmanian Hockey Centre

===== Seventh and eighth place =====
13 April 2003
08:30 (AEST)

Territory Pearls (Northern Territory)	0–3	(Tasmania) Tassie Van Demons
	Report	Clement 24', 28'; Geeves 47'

Stadium:
Tasmanian Hockey Centre

===== Fifth and sixth place =====
13 April 2003
10:30 (AEST)

NSWIS Arrows (New South Wales)	2–1	(South Australia) Adelaide Suns
Brooks 12'; White-Muik 40'	Report	Callow 60'

Stadium:
Tasmanian Hockey Centre

==== First to fourth place classification ====
Semi-finals
12 April 2003
(Queensland) QLD Scorchers	3
(Western Australia) WA Diamonds	0
12 April 2003
(Australian Capital Territory) Canberra Strikers	0
(Victoria (state)) VIS Vipers	1

Final
13 April 2003
(Queensland) QLD Scorchers	3 (4)
(Victoria (state)) VIS Vipers (pen.)	3 (5)
Third Place
13 April 2003
(Western Australia) WA Diamonds	3
(Australian Capital Territory) Canberra Strikers	4

===== Semi-finals =====
12 April 2003
12:30 (AEST)

QLD Scorchers (Queensland)	3–0	(Western Australia) WA Diamonds
Faulkner 37', 49'; Pamenter 58'	Report

Stadium:
Tasmanian Hockey Centre

12 April 2003
14:30 (AEST)

Canberra Strikers (Australian Capital Territory)	0–1	(Victoria (state)) VIS Vipers
	Report	Merrett 56'

Stadium:
Tasmanian Hockey Centre

===== Third and fourth place =====
13 April 2003
12:30 (AEST)

WA Diamonds (Western Australia)	3–4	(Australian Capital Territory) Canberra Strikers
Calton 23'; Napier 33'; Dalby 53'	Report	Gallagher 15'; Powell 21', 28'; Nightingale 59'

Stadium:
Tasmanian Hockey Centre

===== Final =====
13 April 2003
14:30 (AEST)

QLD Scorchers (Queensland)	3–3	(Victoria (state)) VIS Vipers
Cole 18'; Smith 49'; Holmes 63'	Report	Johnston 26', 30'; Harvey 58'
Penalties
	4–5

Stadium:
Tasmanian Hockey Centre

== Awards ==
Player of the League	Top Goalscorer	Player of the Final
(South Australia) Carmel Bakurski	(Australian Capital Territory) Katrina Powell	(Victoria (state)) Rachel Imison

== Statistics ==
=== Final standings ===
Pos	Team	Pld	W	WD	LD	L	GF	GA	GD	Pts	Qualification
1st place, gold medalist(s)	(Victoria (state)) VIS Vipers	13	9	1	1	2	34	19	+15	36	Gold Medal
2nd place, silver medalist(s)	(Queensland) QLD Scorchers	13	9	2	1	1	45	20	+25	40	Silver Medal
3rd place, bronze medalist(s)	(Australian Capital Territory) Canberra Strikers	13	9	2	1	1	38	17	+21	39	Bronze Medal
4	(Western Australia) WA Diamonds	13	6	1	0	6	26	27	−1	26	
5	(New South Wales) NSWIS Arrows	13	6	0	3	4	24	22	+2	24	
6	(South Australia) Adelaide Suns	13	4	0	0	9	21	32	−11	15	
7	(Tasmania) Tassie Van Demons	13	2	1	1	9	19	36	−17	12	
8	(Northern Territory) Territory Pearls	13	0	0	0	13	14	48	−34	0	

Source: Clearing House

=== Goalscorers ===
There were 221 goals scored in 56 matches, for an average of 3.95 goals per match.

17 goals

- (Australian Capital Territory) Katrina Powell

10 goals

- (Queensland) Suzanne Faulkner
- (Queensland) Nicole Hudson
- (Victoria (state)) Julie Towers

8 goals

- (Western Australia) Nicole Dalby

7 goals

- (Australian Capital Territory) Peta Gallagher
- (Victoria (state)) Tamsin Johnston

6 goals

- (New South Wales) Susannah Harris
- (New South Wales) Megan Rivers
- (South Australia) Carmel Bakurski
- (South Australia) Anne-Marie Callow
- (Tasmania) Linda Clement
- (Tasmania) Samantha Judge

5 goals

- (Northern Territory) Shannon Bain
- (Queensland) Renae Holmes
- (Victoria (state)) Louise Dobson
- (Western Australia) Tate Napier

4 goals

- (Australian Capital Territory) Emma Nightingale
- (New South Wales) Megan Sargeant
- (Queensland) Renee Allen
- (Queensland) Karen Smith

3 goals

- (Australian Capital Territory) Nicole Arrold
- (Australian Capital Territory) Sarah Taylor
- (Queensland) Tammy Cole
- (Queensland) Lisa Pamenter
- (South Australia) Mignon Marles
- (South Australia) Donna-Lee Patrick
- (Victoria (state)) Linda Harvey
- (Western Australia) Maaike Kaufmann
- (Western Australia) Shelly Liddelow

2 goals

- (Australian Capital Territory) Dee Jennings
- (New South Wales) Kellie-Lee James
- (New South Wales) Bianca Netzler
- (New South Wales) Natalie White-Muik
- (Northern Territory) Hanna Kozak
- (Northern Territory) Leah Smith
- (Queensland) Katrina Paterson
- (Queensland) Natalie Willims
- (Tasmania) Sofie McLeod
- (Tasmania) Emily Pickup
- (Victoria (state)) Adele Brazenor
- (Western Australia) Amanda Calton
- (Western Australia) Emily Halliday

1 goal

- (Australian Capital Territory) Kadi Rayner
- (Australian Capital Territory) Rachael Roberts
- (New South Wales) Joanne Banning
- (New South Wales) Belinda Brooks
- (Northern Territory) Symone Bell
- (Northern Territory) Jane Bennett
- (Northern Territory) Victoria Bunce
- (Northern Territory) Michelle Caden
- (Northern Territory) Alison Markey
- (Queensland) Hope Brown
- (Queensland) Angela Skirving
- (South Australia) Kymberley Handley
- (South Australia) Rachel Militz
- (South Australia) Anna Souter
- (Tasmania) Bernadette Colrain
- (Tasmania) Nicole Geeves
- (Tasmania) Lis Paget
- (Victoria (state)) Rebecca Eastman
- (Victoria (state)) Joanne Grunden
- (Victoria (state)) Leah Merrett
- (Victoria (state)) Jessica Monkivitch
- (Victoria (state)) Ngaire Smith
- (Victoria (state)) Seanna Stanford
- (Victoria (state)) Renee Trost
- (Western Australia) Elisa Hammond
- (Western Australia) Kim Walker
- (Western Australia) Fiona Young

Source: Hockey Australia
