= 2008 Women's Australian Hockey League =

16th edition women's field hockey tournament

Tournament details
- Host country: Australia
- City: Perth
- Dates: 24 March – 5 April
- Teams: 8
- Venue: Perth Hockey Stadium

Final positions
- Champions: (Western Australia) WA Diamonds (5th title)
- Runner-up: (Queensland) QLD Scorchers
- Third place: (Australian Capital Territory) Canberra Strikers

Tournament statistics
- Matches played: 36
- Goals scored: 144 (4 per match)
- Top scorer: (Western Australia) Sian Smithson (7 goals)
- Best player: (Queensland) Madonna Blyth

The 2008 Women's Australian Hockey League was the 16th edition women's field hockey tournament. The tournament was held between 24 March – 5 April 2008.

WA Diamonds won the tournament for the fifth time after defeating QLD Scorchers 2–0 in the final. Canberra Strikers finished in third place after defeating NSW Arrows 2–0 in the third and fourth place playoff.

== Participating teams ==
- (Australian Capital Territory) Canberra Strikers
- (New South Wales) NSW Arrows
- (Northern Territory) NT Pearls
- (Queensland) QLD Scorchers
- (South Australia) Southern Suns
- (Tasmania) Tassie Van Demons
- (Victoria (state)) VIC Vipers
- (Western Australia) WA Diamonds

== Competition format ==
The 2008 Women's Australian Hockey League consisted of a single round robin format, followed by classification matches.

Teams from all 8 states and territories competed against one another throughout the pool stage. At the conclusion of the pool stage, the top four ranked teams progressed to the semi-finals, while the bottom four teams continued to the classification stage.

=== Point Allocation ===
All matches had an outright result, meaning drawn matches were decided in either golden goal extra time, or a penalty shoot-out. Match points were as follows:

· 3 points for a win
· 1 points to each team in the event of a draw
· 1 point will be awarded to the winner of the shoot-out
· 0 points to the loser of the match

== Results ==
=== Preliminary round ===
Pos	Team	Pld	W	WD	LD	L	GF	GA	GD	Pts	Qualification
1	(Western Australia) WA Diamonds	7	6	0	0	1	21	4	+17	18	Semi-finals
2	(Queensland) QLD Scorchers	7	6	0	0	1	21	4	+17	18	Semi-finals
3	(New South Wales) NSW Arrows	7	6	0	0	1	21	8	+13	18	Semi-finals
4	(Australian Capital Territory) Canberra Strikers	7	3	1	0	3	18	23	−5	11	Semi-finals
5	(Victoria (state)) VIC Vipers	7	2	1	1	3	17	16	+1	9	
6	(South Australia) Southern Suns	7	2	0	1	4	8	24	−16	7	
7	(Northern Territory) NT Pearls	7	1	0	0	6	14	26	−12	3	
8	(Tasmania) Tassie Van Demons	7	0	0	0	7	5	20	−15	0	

Source: Clearing House
Rules for classification: 1) points; 2) goal difference; 3) goals scored; 4) head-to-head result.

==== Pool matches ====
25 March 2008
12:00

Canberra Strikers (Australian Capital Territory)	3–1	(Tasmania) Tassie Van Demons
Harrison 14'; Allen 33'; Young 59'	Report	Blake 55'

Umpires:
Melissa Trivic (AUS)
Kim Kuk-Hee (AUS)

25 March 2008
14:00

Southern Suns (South Australia)	0–5	(Queensland) QLD Scorchers
	Report	Bennett 7'; Lambert 27', 53'; Faulkner 45'; Beattie 58'

Umpires:
Lisa Roach (AUS)
Catherine Mok (AUS)

25 March 2008
16:00

VIC Vipers (Victoria (state))	5–3	(Northern Territory) NT Pearls
Van Veenendaal 6'; O'Conner 20', 46'; Trost 36'; Merrett 39'	Report	Mountain 9', 47'; Gale 53'

Umpires:
Aleeta Micallef (AUS)
Deborah Rollason (AUS)

25 March 2008
18:00

WA Diamonds (Western Australia)	0–1	(New South Wales) NSW Arrows
	Report	Hollywood 38'

Umpires:
Minka Woolley (AUS)
Lynn Cowie-McAlister (AUS)

26 March 2008
12:00

Southern Suns (South Australia)	2–6	(Australian Capital Territory) Canberra Strikers
Swann 44'; Sharland 65'	Report	Taylor 15', 46'; Allen 43', 59'; Forgesson 58', 60'

Umpires:
Aleeta Micallef (AUS)
Deborah Rollason (AUS)

26 March 2008
14:00

NT Pearls (Northern Territory)	1–6	(Western Australia) WA Diamonds
Young 62'	Report	Liddelow 5'; Buckley 31', 66'; Ciallella 35'; Halliday 43', 45'

Umpires:
Lisa Roach (AUS)
Catherine Mok (AUS)

26 March 2008
16:00

Tassie Van Demons (Tasmania)	1–5	(Victoria (state)) VIC Vipers
Wilson 30'	Report	Messent 7', 67', 70'; Merrett 53'; Van Veenendaal 61'

Umpires:
Leah Giddey (AUS)
Lynn Cowie-McAlister (AUS)

26 March 2008
18:00

NSW Arrows (New South Wales)	0–1	(Queensland) QLD Scorchers
	Report	M. Hudson 23'

Umpires:
Melissa Trivic (AUS)
Lisa Roach (AUS)

27 March 2008
12:00

QLD Scorchers (Queensland)	4–0	(Northern Territory) NT Pearls
Faulkner 16', 31', 68'; Lambert 23'	Report

Umpires:
Melissa Trivic (AUS)
Leah Giddey (AUS)

27 March 2008
14:00

Southern Suns (South Australia)	0–4	(Western Australia) WA Diamonds
	Report	Ciallella 6'; Liddelow 12'; Halliday 27'; Walker 61'

Umpires:
Lisa Roach (AUS)
Lynn Cowie-McAlister (AUS)

27 March 2008
16:00

Tassie Van Demons (Tasmania)	1–2	(New South Wales) NSW Arrows
Cooling 49'	Report	Barber 58'; Hurtz 63'

Umpires:
Catherine Mok (AUS)
Aleeta Micallef (AUS)

27 March 2008
18:00

Canberra Strikers (Australian Capital Territory)	2–2	(Victoria (state)) VIC Vipers
Allen 12'; Young 67'	Report	Trahar 44'; Trost 47'
Penalties
Harrison (penalty shoot-out scored); Allen (penalty shoot-out missed); Young (penalty shoot-out scored); Forgesson (penalty shoot-out scored); Arrold (penalty shoot-out scored)	4–3	(penalty shoot-out missed) Messent; (penalty shoot-out scored) Trost; (penalty shoot-out scored) Joseph; (penalty shoot-out scored) Chau; (penalty shoot-out missed) O'Conner

Umpires:
Kim Kuk-Hee (AUS)
Minka Woolley (AUS)

29 March 2008
12:00

VIC Vipers (Victoria (state))	0–1	(Western Australia) WA Diamonds
	Report	Smithson 11'

Umpires:
Minka Woolley (AUS)
Leah Giddey (AUS)

29 March 2008
14:00

NSW Arrows (New South Wales)	6–1	(South Australia) Southern Suns
Rivers 3'; James 6'; Hurtz 10'; Hollywood 12'; Barber 28'; Sanders 31'	Report	Lange 43'

Umpires:
Aleeta Micallef (AUS)
Melissa Trivic (AUS)

29 March 2008
16:00

QLD Scorchers (Queensland)	4–2	(Australian Capital Territory) Canberra Strikers
Blyth 8'; Richards 25'; N. Hudson 44', 54'	Report	Forgesson 42'; Lucas 60'

Umpires:
Lisa Roach (AUS)
Lynn Cowie-McAlister (AUS)

29 March 2008
18:00

Tassie Van Demons (Tasmania)	1–5	(Northern Territory) NT Pearls
Jones 23'	Report	Ono 13'; Mountain 33'; Chiu 38'; Gale 53'; Clarke 62'

Umpires:
Deborah Rollason (AUS)
Kim Kuk-Hee (AUS)

30 March 2008
12:00

NSW Arrows (New South Wales)	4–3	(Victoria (state)) VIC Vipers
Cocking 18'; Hollywood 21', 38'; Hurtz 66'	Report	Messent 29'; Merrett 43'; Riordan 52'

Umpires:
Lynn Cowie-McAlister (AUS)
Kim Kuk-Hee (AUS)

30 March 2008
14:00

NT Pearls (Northern Territory)	3–4	(Australian Capital Territory) Canberra Strikers
Pericles 2'; Ono 45', 70+'	Report	Young 12'; Taylor 23'; Harrison 50'; Allen 65'

Umpires:
Catherine Mok (AUS)
Aleeta Micallef (AUS)

30 March 2008
16:00

WA Diamonds (Western Australia)	2–1	(Queensland) QLD Scorchers
Halliday 13'; Munro 15'	Report	Beattie 29'

Umpires:
Lisa Roach (AUS)
Minka Woolley (AUS)

30 March 2008
18:00

Tassie Van Demons (Tasmania)	0–1	(South Australia) Southern Suns
	Report	Saunders 20'

Umpires:
Deborah Rollason (AUS)
Melissa Trivic (AUS)

1 April 2008
12:00

VIC Vipers (Victoria (state))	0–4	(Queensland) QLD Scorchers
	Report	Faulkner 19', 37'; Eiser 45'; Attard 56'

Umpires:
Aleeta Micallef (AUS)
Catherine Mok (AUS)

1 April 2008
14:00

NSW Arrows (New South Wales)	5–1	(Australian Capital Territory) Canberra Strikers
Hollywood 3', 8'; James 22'; Hamahona 38'; Rivers 44'	Report	Harrison 40'

Umpires:
Deborah Rollason (AUS)
Melissa Trivic (AUS)

1 April 2008
16:00

NT Pearls (Northern Territory)	1–3	(South Australia) Southern Suns
Ono 63'	Report	Sharland 11', 44'; Hampton 13'

Umpires:
Kim Kuk-Hee (AUS)
Lisa Roach (AUS)

1 April 2008
18:00

WA Diamonds (Western Australia)	2–1	(Tasmania) Tassie Van Demons
Munro 17'; Smithson 66'	Report	Douglas 37'

Umpires:
Lynn Cowie-McAlister (AUS)
Leah Giddey (AUS)

2 April 2008
12:00

NT Pearls (Northern Territory)	1–3	(New South Wales) NSW Arrows
Ono 51'	Report	Hurtz 11'; Eastham 13'; Rivers 16'

Umpires:
Catherine Mok (AUS)
Deborah Rollason (AUS)

2 April 2008
14:00

QLD Scorchers (Queensland)	2–0	(Tasmania) Tassie Van Demons
N. Hudson 14'; Reuter 65'	Report

Umpires:
Kim Kuk-Hee (AUS)
Melissa Trivic (AUS)

2 April 2008
16:00

Southern Suns (South Australia)	1–2 (a.e.t.)	(Victoria (state)) VIC Vipers
Sharland 58'	Report	Riordan 23'; Messent 82'

Umpires:
Lynn Cowie-McAlister (AUS)
Leah Giddey (AUS)

2 April 2008
18:00

WA Diamonds (Western Australia)	6–0	(Australian Capital Territory) Canberra Strikers
Smithson 9', 16', 65'; Pamenter 32'; Munro 63'; Liddelow 70'	Report

Umpires:
Aleeta Micallef (AUS)
Minka Woolley (AUS)

=== Classification round ===
==== Fifth to eighth place classification ====
Crossover
4 April 2008
(Victoria (state)) VIC Vipers	0
(Tasmania) Tassie Van Demons (a.e.t)	1
4 April 2008
(South Australia) Southern Suns (a.e.t)	2
(Northern Territory) NT Pearls	1

Fifth place
5 April 2008
(Tasmania) Tassie Van Demons	0
(South Australia) Southern Suns	1
Seventh Place
5 April 2008
(Victoria (state)) VIC Vipers	2
(Northern Territory) NT Pearls	0

===== Crossover =====
4 April 2008
12:00

VIC Vipers (Victoria (state))	0–1 (a.e.t.)	(Tasmania) Tassie Van Demons
	Report	Jones 73'

Umpires:
Kim Kuk-Hee (AUS)
Leah Giddey (AUS)

4 April 2008
14:00

Southern Suns (South Australia)	2–1 (a.e.t.)	(Northern Territory) NT Pearls
Sharland 18', 81'	Report	Ono 44'

Umpires:
Catherine Mok (AUS)
Deborah Rollason (AUS)

===== Seventh and eighth place =====
5 April 2008
10:00

VIC Vipers (Victoria (state))	2–0	(Northern Territory) NT Pearls
Van Veenendaal 18', 28'	Report

Umpires:
Kim Kuk-Hee (AUS)
Deborah Rollason (AUS)

===== Fifth and sixth place =====
5 April 2008
12:00

Tassie Van Demons (Tasmania)	0–1	(South Australia) Southern Suns
	Report	Stacy 58'

Umpires:
Catherine Mok (AUS)
Leah Giddey (AUS)

==== First to fourth place classification ====
Semi-finals
4 April 2008
(Western Australia) WA Diamonds (a.e.t)	4
(Australian Capital Territory) Canberra Strikers	3
4 April 2008
(Queensland) QLD Scorchers (a.e.t)	1
(New South Wales) NSW Arrows	0

Final
5 April 2008
(Western Australia) WA Diamonds	2
(Queensland) QLD Scorchers	0
Third and Fourth Place
5 April 2008
(Australian Capital Territory) Canberra Strikers	2
(New South Wales) NSW Arrows	0

===== Semi-finals =====
4 April 2008
16:00

WA Diamonds (Western Australia)	4–3 (a.e.t.)	(Australian Capital Territory) Canberra Strikers
Pamenter 9'; Halliday 12'; Smithson 64', 73'	Report	Desmet 15'; Allen 18'; Young 45'

Umpires:
Lynn Cowie-McAlister (AUS)
Aleeta Micallef (AUS)

4 April 2008
18:00

QLD Scorchers (Queensland)	1–0 (a.e.t.)	(New South Wales) NSW Arrows
N. Hudson 82'	Report

Umpires:
Lisa Roach (AUS)
Melissa Trivic (AUS)

===== Third and fourth place =====
5 April 2008
14:00

Canberra Strikers (Australian Capital Territory)	2–0	(New South Wales) NSW Arrows
Arrold 20'; Stewart 34'	Report

Umpires:
Lynn Cowie-McAlister (AUS)
Aleeta Micallef (AUS)

===== Final =====
5 April 2008
16:00

WA Diamonds (Western Australia)	2–0	(Queensland) QLD Scorchers
Munro 50'; Halliday 65'	Report

Umpires:
Lisa Roach (AUS)
Melissa Trivic (AUS)

== Awards ==
Player of the Tournament	Top Goalscorer	Player of the Final
(Queensland) Madonna Blyth	(Western Australia) Sian Smithson	(Western Australia) Kobie McGurk

== Statistics ==
=== Final standings ===
Pos	Team	Pld	W	WD	LD	L	GF	GA	GD	Pts	Qualification
1st place, gold medalist(s)	(Western Australia) WA Diamonds	9	7	1	0	1	27	7	+20	23	Gold Medal
2nd place, silver medalist(s)	(Queensland) QLD Scorchers	9	6	1	0	2	22	6	+16	20	Silver Medal
3rd place, bronze medalist(s)	(Australian Capital Territory) Canberra Strikers	9	4	1	1	3	23	27	−4	15	Bronze Medal
4	(New South Wales) NSW Arrows	9	6	0	1	2	21	11	+10	19	
5	(South Australia) Southern Suns	9	3	1	1	4	11	25	−14	12	
6	(Tasmania) Tassie Van Demons	9	0	1	0	8	6	21	−15	2	
7	(Victoria (state)) VIC Vipers	9	3	1	2	3	19	17	+2	13	
8	(Northern Territory) NT Pearls	9	1	0	1	7	15	30	−15	4	

Source: Clearing House

=== Goalscorers ===
There were 144 goals scored in 36 matches, for an average of 4 goals per match.

7 goals

- (Western Australia) Sian Smithson

6 goals

- (Australian Capital Territory) Renee Allen
- (New South Wales) Kate Hollywood
- (Northern Territory) Mayumi Ono
- (Queensland) Suzanne Faulkner
- (South Australia) Kayla Sharland
- (Western Australia) Emily Halliday

5 goals

- (Victoria (state)) Claire Messent

4 goals

- (Australian Capital Territory) Sarah Young
- (New South Wales) Emily Hurtz
- (Queensland) Nicole Hudson
- (Victoria (state)) Mariet van Veenendaal
- (Western Australia) Hope Munro

3 goals

- (Australian Capital Territory) Krystal Forgesson
- (Australian Capital Territory) Charlotte Harrison
- (Australian Capital Territory) Emma Taylor
- (New South Wales) Megan Rivers
- (Northern Territory) Barbara Mountain
- (Queensland) Angela Lambert
- (Victoria (state)) Leah Merrett
- (Western Australia) Shelly Liddelow

2 goals

- (New South Wales) Ebony Barber
- (New South Wales) Kellie-Lee James
- (Northern Territory) Samantha Gale
- (Queensland) Wendy Beattie
- (Tasmania) Jacqueline Jones
- (Victoria (state)) Sarah O'Conner
- (Victoria (state)) Renee Trost
- (Victoria (state)) Stephanie Riordan
- (Western Australia) Jemma Buckley
- (Western Australia) Chantelle Ciallella
- (Western Australia) Lisa Pamenter

1 goal

- (Australian Capital Territory) Nicole Arrold
- (Australian Capital Territory) Karina Lucas
- (Australian Capital Territory) Toni Stewart
- (Australian Capital Territory) Laura Desmet
- (New South Wales) Kasey Cocking
- (New South Wales) Casey Eastham
- (New South Wales) Piki Hamahona
- (New South Wales) Rebecca Sanders
- (Northern Territory) Olivia Chiu
- (Northern Territory) Aimee Clarke
- (Northern Territory) Caroline Pericles
- (Northern Territory) Fiona Young
- (Queensland) Teneal Attard
- (Queensland) Jane Bennett
- (Queensland) Madonna Blyth
- (Queensland) Prue Eiser
- (Queensland) Marnie Hudson
- (Queensland) Rebecca Reuter
- (Queensland) Lauren Richards
- (South Australia) Rachel Hampton
- (South Australia) Sarah Lange
- (South Australia) Kate Saunders
- (South Australia) Elise Stacy
- (South Australia) Amy Swann
- (Tasmania) Jessica Blake
- (Tasmania) Michelle Cooling
- (Tasmania) Abby Douglas
- (Tasmania) Jessica Blake
- (Victoria (state)) Erica Trahar
- (Western Australia) Kimberly Walker

Source: Clearing House
