= 1999 Women's Australian Hockey League =

Tournament details
- Host country: Australia
- Dates: 25 June – 18 July
- Teams: 7
- Venue: 7 (in 7 host cities)

Final positions
- Champions: (New South Wales) NSW Arrows (4th title)
- Runner-up: (Australian Capital Territory) Canberra Strikers
- Third place: (Queensland) QLD Scorchers

Tournament statistics
- Matches played: 25
- Goals scored: 90 (3.6 per match)
- Top scorer: (Australian Capital Territory) Katrina Powell (8 goals)
- Best player: (Australian Capital Territory) Katrina Powell

The 1999 Women's Australian Hockey League (AHL) was the 7th edition of the women's field hockey tournament. The tournament was held in various cities across Australia, and was contested from 25 June through to 18 July 1999.

NSW Arrows won the tournament for the fourth time after defeating Canberra Strikers 3–0 in the final. QLD Scorchers finished in third place after defeating Adelaide Suns 1–0 in the third and fourth place playoff.

== Participating teams ==
- (Australian Capital Territory) Canberra Strikers
- (New South Wales) NSW Arrows
- (Queensland) QLD Scorchers
- (South Australia) Adelaide Suns
- (Tasmania) Tassie Van Demons
- (Victoria (state)) VIS Vipers
- (Western Australia) WAIS Diamonds

== Venues ==
Sydney	Adelaide	Brisbane
State Hockey Centre	Pines Hockey Stadium	Queensland Hockey Centre
Capacity: 8,000	Capacity: 4,000	Capacity: 3,000
1999 Women's Australian Hockey League is located in Australia		Melbourne
1999 Women's Australian Hockey League is located in Australia		Doncaster Hockey Club
1999 Women's Australian Hockey League is located in Australia		Canberra
1999 Women's Australian Hockey League is located in Australia		Lyneham Hockey Centre
1999 Women's Australian Hockey League is located in Australia		Hobart
1999 Women's Australian Hockey League is located in Australia		Tasmanian Hockey Centre
1999 Women's Australian Hockey League is located in Australia		Toowoomba
1999 Women's Australian Hockey League is located in Australia		Clyde Park Hockey Stadium

== Competition format ==
The 1999 Women's Australian Hockey League consisted of a single round robin format, followed by classification matches.

Teams from 7 of Australia's states and territories competed against one another throughout the pool stage. At the conclusion of the pool stage, the top four ranked teams progressed to the semi-finals.

=== Point allocation ===
Points
W	WD	LD	L
3	2	1	0

Every match in the 1999 AHL needed an outright result. In the event of a draw, golden goal extra time was played out, and if the result was still a draw a penalty shoot-out was contested, with the winner receiving a bonus point.

== Results ==
=== Preliminary round ===
Pos	Team	Pld	W	WD	LD	L	GF	GA	GD	Pts	Qualification
1	(Queensland) QLD Scorchers	6	4	1	0	1	11	6	+5	14	Semi-finals
2	(Australian Capital Territory) Canberra Strikers	6	3	1	1	1	11	9	+2	12	Semi-finals
3	(South Australia) Adelaide Suns	6	2	2	1	1	8	7	+1	11	Semi-finals
4	(New South Wales) NSW Arrows	6	2	1	1	2	15	11	+4	9	Semi-finals
5	(Tasmania) Tassie Van Demons	6	2	1	0	3	11	13	−2	8	
6	(Victoria (state)) VIS Vipers	6	1	1	1	3	12	12	0	6	
7	(Western Australia) WAIS Diamonds	6	0	0	3	3	11	21	−10	3	

Source: Clearing House
Rules for classification: 1) points; 2) head-to-head result; 3) goal difference; 4) matches won; 5) goals scored.

==== Fixtures ====
25 June 1999
13:00 (AEST)

Tassie Van Demons (Tasmania)	2–3	(New South Wales) NSW Arrows
Wallington 43'; B. Langham 60'	Report	J. Towers 7'; Twitt 12'; K. Towers 40'

Stadium:
State Hockey Centre, Sydney

26 June 1999
12:00 (AEST)

QLD Scorchers (Queensland)	0–1	(South Australia) Adelaide Suns
	Report	C. Souter 17'

Stadium:
Lyneham Hockey Centre, Canberra

26 June 1999
13:30 (AEST)

NSW Arrows (New South Wales)	7–2	(Western Australia) WAIS Diamonds
Robards 32'; J. Towers 38'; Annan 47'; Booth 49'; Tassell 52'; Banning 59'; K. Towers 61'	Report	Hakwes 23'; Andrews 24'

Stadium:
State Hockey Centre, Sydney

26 June 1999
14:00 (AEST)

VIS Vipers (Victoria (state))	0–1	(Australian Capital Territory) Canberra Strikers
	Report	Powell 30'

Stadium:
Lyneham Hockey Centre, Canberra

27 June 1999
12:00 (AEST)

Adelaide Suns (South Australia)	1–1	(Victoria (state)) VIS Vipers
Collett 56'	Report	Taylor 35'
Penalties
	4–3

Stadium:
Lyneham Hockey Centre, Canberra

27 June 1999
13:30 (AEST)

WAIS Diamonds (Western Australia)	1–2 (a.e.t.)	(Tasmania) Tassie Van Demons
Ringrose 47'	Report	B. Langham 27'; Walker 78'

Stadium:
State Hockey Centre, Sydney

27 June 1999
14:00 (AEST)

Canberra Strikers (Australian Capital Territory)	0–3	(Queensland) QLD Scorchers
	Report	Baker 45'; Faulkner 56'; Callow 70+'

Stadium:
Lyneham Hockey Centre, Canberra

2 July 1999
14:30 (AEST)

VIS Vipers (Victoria (state))	2–3	(Tasmania) Tassie Van Demons
B. Imison 67'; Dobson 69'	Report	M. Langham 4'; McDonald 26'; B. Langham 35+'

Stadium:
Doncaster Hockey Club, Melbourne

3 July 1999
12:00 (ACST)

Canberra Strikers (Australian Capital Territory)	4–2	(Western Australia) WAIS Diamonds
Powell 21'; MacKinnon 34', 61'; Smyth 69'	Report	Starre 25', 28'

Stadium:
Pines Hockey Stadium, Adelaide

3 July 1999
14:00 (ACST)

Adelaide Suns (South Australia)	1–0	(New South Wales) NSW Arrows
Collett 23'	Report

Stadium:
Pines Hockey Stadium, Adelaide

3 July 1999
14:30 (AEST)

Tassie Van Demons (Tasmania)	1–2	(Queensland) QLD Scorchers
B. Langham 43'	Report	Skirving 62'; Mott 66'

Stadium:
Doncaster Hockey Club, Melbourne

4 July 1999
12:00 (ACST)

NSW Arrows (New South Wales)	3–2 (a.e.t.)	(Australian Capital Territory) Canberra Strikers
Morrison 26'; Booth 70'; K. Towers 75'	Report	Powell 13', 48'

Stadium:
Pines Hockey Stadium, Adelaide

4 July 1999
14:00 (ACST)

WAIS Diamonds (Western Australia)	2–2	(South Australia) Adelaide Suns
Ringrose 10'; Starre 45'	Report	McIlwraith 30'; C. Souter 33'
Penalties
	2–3

Stadium:
Pines Hockey Stadium, Adelaide

4 July 1999
14:30 (AEST)

QLD Scorchers (Queensland)	3–2	(Victoria (state)) VIS Vipers
Mott 4', 31'; Faulkner 10'	Report	Purcell 32'; Truscott 47'

Stadium:
Doncaster Hockey Club, Melbourne

9 July 1999
17:00 (AEST)

Adelaide Suns (South Australia)	1–1	(Australian Capital Territory) Canberra Strikers
C. Souter 58'	Report	Paterson 54'
Penalties
	3–4

Stadium:
Tasmanian Hockey Centre, Hobart

10 July 1999
13:00 (AEST)

QLD Scorchers (Queensland)	1–0	(New South Wales) NSW Arrows
Callow 37'	Report

Stadium:
Clyde Park Hockey Stadium, Toowoomba

10 July 1999
14:00 (AEST)

Tassie Van Demons (Tasmania)	3–2	(South Australia) Adelaide Suns
Wallington 6'; B. Langham 51', 64'	Report	Wood 46'; Delaine 60'

Stadium:
Tasmanian Hockey Centre, Hobart

10 July 1999
15:00 (AEST)

VIS Vipers (Victoria (state))	4–2	(Western Australia) WAIS Diamonds
Harvey 24'; Mitchell-Taverner 34'; N. Smith 35'; Spalding 38'	Report	Andrews 22', 56'

Stadium:
Clyde Park Hockey Stadium, Toowoomba

11 July 1999
11:00 (AEST)

Canberra Strikers (Australian Capital Territory)	3–0	(Tasmania) Tassie Van Demons
Powell 14', 67'; Staunton 32'	Report

Stadium:
Tasmanian Hockey Centre, Hobart

11 July 1999
13:00 (AEST)

WAIS Diamonds (Western Australia)	2–2	(Queensland) QLD Scorchers
Mounsey 14'; Andrews 57'	Report	Faulkner 17'; Callow 64'
Penalties
	2–4

Stadium:
Queensland Hockey Centre, Brisbane

11 July 1999
15:00 (AEST)

NSW Arrows (New South Wales)	2–3 (a.e.t.)	(Victoria (state)) VIS Vipers
J. Towers 13'; Banning 42'	Report	B. Imison 23'; Spalding 40'; Mitchell-Taverner 74'

Stadium:
Queensland Hockey Centre, Brisbane

=== Classification round ===
Semi-finals
17 July 1999
(Queensland) QLD Scorchers	2
(New South Wales) NSW Arrows	3
17 July 1999
(Australian Capital Territory) Canberra Strikers	2
(South Australia) Adelaide Suns	0

Final
18 July 1999
(New South Wales) NSW Arrows	3
(Australian Capital Territory) Canberra Strikers	0
Third place
18 July 1999
(Queensland) QLD Scorchers (a.e.t)	1
(South Australia) Adelaide Suns	0

==== Semi-finals ====
17 July 1999
11:30 (AEST)

QLD Scorchers (Queensland)	2–3	(New South Wales) NSW Arrows
Faulkner 53'; Mott 55'	Report	J. Towers 31'; K. Towers 40'; Banning 65'

Stadium:
National Hockey Centre, Canberra

17 July 1999
13:30 (AEST)

Canberra Strikers (Australian Capital Territory)	2–0	(South Australia) Adelaide Suns
Powell 13', 39'	Report

Stadium:
National Hockey Centre, Canberra

==== Third and fourth place ====
18 July 1999
11:30 (AEST)

QLD Scorchers (Queensland)	1–0 (a.e.t.)	(South Australia) Adelaide Suns
Mott 82'	Report

Stadium:
National Hockey Centre, Canberra

==== Final ====
18 July 1999
13:30 (AEST)

NSW Arrows (New South Wales)	3–0	(Australian Capital Territory) Canberra Strikers
J. Towers 31'; Ellick 38'; Morrison 42'	Report

Stadium:
National Hockey Centre, Canberra

== Awards ==
Player of the League	Top Goalscorer	Player of the Final
(Australian Capital Territory) Katrina Powell	(Australian Capital Territory) Katrina Powell	(New South Wales) Melanie Twitt

== Statistics ==
=== Final standings ===
Pos	Team	Pld	W	WD	LD	L	GF	GA	GD	Pts	Qualification
1st place, gold medalist(s)	(New South Wales) NSW Arrows	8	4	1	1	2	21	13	+8	15	Gold Medal
2nd place, silver medalist(s)	(Australian Capital Territory) Canberra Strikers	8	4	1	1	2	13	12	+1	15	Silver Medal
3rd place, bronze medalist(s)	(Queensland) QLD Scorchers	8	4	2	0	2	14	9	+5	16	Bronze Medal
4	(South Australia) Adelaide Suns	8	2	2	2	2	8	10	−2	12	Fourth place
5	(Tasmania) Tassie Van Demons	6	2	1	0	3	11	13	−2	8	Eliminated in group stage
6	(Victoria (state)) VIS Vipers	6	1	1	1	3	12	12	0	6	Eliminated in group stage
7	(Western Australia) WAIS Diamonds	6	0	0	3	3	11	21	−10	3	Eliminated in group stage

Source: Clearing House

=== Goalscorers ===
There were 90 goals scored in 25 matches, for an average of 3.6 goals per match.

8 goals

- (Australian Capital Territory) Katrina Powell

6 goals

- (Tasmania) Bianca Langham

5 goals

- (New South Wales) Julie Towers
- (Queensland) Nicole Mott

4 goals

- (New South Wales) Kristen Towers
- (Queensland) Suzanne Faulkner
- (Western Australia) Michelle Andrews

3 goals

- (New South Wales) Joanne Banning
- (Queensland) Anne-Marie Callow
- (South Australia) Carmel Souter
- (Western Australia) Kate Starre

2 goals

- (Australian Capital Territory) Kate MacKinnon
- (New South Wales) Sarah Booth
- (New South Wales) Brooke Morrison
- (South Australia) Charmaine Collett
- (Tasmania) Simone Wallington
- (Victoria (state)) Bethany Imison
- (Victoria (state)) Claire Mitchell-Taverner
- (Victoria (state)) Sheree Spalding
- (Western Australia) Candice Ringrose

1 goal

- (Australian Capital Territory) Katrina Paterson
- (Australian Capital Territory) Erin Smyth
- (Australian Capital Territory) Tonina Staunton
- (New South Wales) Alyson Annan
- (New South Wales) Lisa Ellick
- (New South Wales) Kimberlee Robards
- (New South Wales) Wendy Tassell
- (New South Wales) Melanie Twitt
- (Queensland) Narelle Baker
- (Queensland) Angela Skirving
- (South Australia) Kristy Delaine
- (South Australia) Rebecca McIlwraith
- (South Australia) Kate Wood
- (Tasmania) Marcelle Langham
- (Tasmania) Vanessa McDonald
- (Tasmania) Kimberley Walker
- (Victoria (state)) Louise Dobson
- (Victoria (state)) Linda Harvey
- (Victoria (state)) Lisa Purcell
- (Victoria (state)) Ngaire Smith
- (Victoria (state)) Kristen Taylor
- (Victoria (state)) Rachel Truscott
- (Western Australia) Rechelle Hawkes
- (Western Australia) Denise Mounsey
