= 1998 Women's Australian Hockey League =

Women's Australian Hockey League from 25th of June to 18th of July 1999

Tournament details
- Host country: Australia
- Dates: 6 June – 26 July
- Teams: 7
- Venue: 7 (in 7 host cities)

Final positions
- Champions: (New South Wales) NSW Arrows (3rd title)
- Runner-up: (Queensland) QLD Scorchers
- Third place: (Western Australia) WAIS Diamonds

Tournament statistics
- Matches played: 46
- Goals scored: 180 (3.91 per match)
- Best player: (Western Australia) Michelle Andrews

The 1998 Women's Australian Hockey League (AHL) was the 6th edition of the women's field hockey tournament. The tournament was held in various cities across Australia, and was contested from 25 June through to 18 July 1999.

NSW Arrows won the tournament for the third time after defeating QLD Scorchers 4–3 in the final. WAIS Diamonds finished in third place after defeating ACT Strikers 3–2 in the third and fourth place playoff.

== Participating teams ==
- (Australian Capital Territory) ACT Strikers
- (New South Wales) NSW Arrows
- (Queensland) QLD Scorchers
- (South Australia) Adelaide Suns
- (Tasmania) Tassie Van Demons
- (Victoria (state)) VIS Vipers
- (Western Australia) WAIS Diamonds

== Results ==
=== Preliminary round ===
==== Pool ====
Pos	Team	Pld	W	D	L	GF	GA	GD	Pts	Qualification
1	(Western Australia) WAIS Diamonds	12	7	2	3	37	24	+13	23	Advance to Semi-finals
2	(Australian Capital Territory) ACT Strikers	12	6	5	1	24	22	+2	23	Advance to Semi-finals
3	(New South Wales) NSW Arrows	12	5	5	2	22	16	+6	20	Advance to Semi-finals
4	(Queensland) QLD Scorchers	12	4	6	2	24	23	+1	18	Advance to Semi-finals
5	(Tasmania) Tassie Van Demons	12	3	3	6	18	21	−3	12	
6	(Victoria (state)) VIS Vipers	12	3	3	6	25	30	−5	12	
7	(South Australia) Adelaide Suns	12	1	2	9	11	25	−14	5	

Source: Hockey Australia
Rules for classification: 1) points; 2) head-to-head result; 3) goal difference; 4) matches won; 5) goals scored.

==== Fixtures ====
6 June 1998
13:00 (AEST)

Tassie Van Demons (Tasmania)	1–0	(Queensland) QLD Scorchers
	Report

Stadium:
Tasmanian Hockey Centre, Hobart

6 June 1998
14:00 (ACST)

Adelaide Suns (South Australia)	0–2	(New South Wales) NSW Arrows
	Report

Stadium:
Pines Hockey Stadium, Adelaide

6 June 1998
16:30 (AWST)

WAIS Diamonds (Western Australia)	1–2	(Australian Capital Territory) ACT Strikers
	Report

Stadium:
Perth Hockey Stadium, Perth

7 June 1998
13:00 (AEST)

Tassie Van Demons (Tasmania)	3–3	(Queensland) QLD Scorchers
	Report

Stadium:
Tasmanian Hockey Centre, Hobart

7 June 1998
14:00 (ACST)

Adelaide Suns (South Australia)	1–2	(New South Wales) NSW Arrows
	Report

Stadium:
Pines Hockey Stadium, Adelaide

7 June 1998
14:30 (AWST)

WAIS Diamonds (Western Australia)	6–1	(Australian Capital Territory) ACT Strikers
	Report

Stadium:
Perth Hockey Stadium, Perth

13 June 1998
13:00 (AEST)

NSW Arrows (New South Wales)	3–2	(Victoria (state)) VIS Vipers
	Report

Stadium:
State Hockey Centre, Sydney

13 June 1998
16:30 (AWST)

WAIS Diamonds (Western Australia)	4–2	(South Australia) Adelaide Suns
	Report

Stadium:
Perth Hockey Stadium, Perth

14 June 1998
13:00 (AEST)

NSW Arrows (New South Wales)	2–2	(Victoria (state)) VIS Vipers
	Report

Stadium:
State Hockey Centre, Sydney

14 June 1998
16:30 (AWST)

WAIS Diamonds (Western Australia)	1–0	(South Australia) Adelaide Suns
	Report

Stadium:
Perth Hockey Stadium, Perth

16 June 1998
18:30 (AEST)

Tassie Van Demons (Tasmania)	2–0	(New South Wales) NSW Arrows
	Report

Stadium:
Tasmanian Hockey Centre, Hobart

16 June 1998
18:30 (AEST)

QLD Scorchers (Queensland)	1–0	(South Australia) Adelaide Suns
	Report

Stadium:
Warwick Hockey Association, Warwick

17 June 1998
18:30 (AEST)

Tassie Van Demons (Tasmania)	0–1	(New South Wales) NSW Arrows
	Report

Stadium:
Tasmanian Hockey Centre, Hobart

17 June 1998
18:30 (AEST)

QLD Scorchers (Queensland)	3–3	(South Australia) Adelaide Suns
	Report

Stadium:
State Hockey Centre, Brisbane

20 June 1998
14:00 (AEST)

ACT Strikers (Australian Capital Territory)	0–0	(New South Wales) NSW Arrows
	Report

Stadium:
The Hockey Centre, Canberra

20 June 1998
14:30 (ACST)

Adelaide Suns (South Australia)	0–4	(Victoria (state)) VIS Vipers
	Report

Stadium:
Pines Hockey Stadium, Adelaide

21 June 1998
14:00 (AEST)

ACT Strikers (Australian Capital Territory)	4–4	(New South Wales) NSW Arrows
	Report

Stadium:
The Hockey Centre, Canberra

21 June 1998
14:30 (ACST)

Adelaide Suns (South Australia)	1–3	(Victoria (state)) VIS Vipers
	Report

Stadium:
Pines Hockey Stadium, Adelaide

27 June 1998
14:00 (AEST)

ACT Strikers (Australian Capital Territory)	2–0	(Queensland) QLD Scorchers
	Report

Stadium:
The Hockey Centre, Canberra

27 June 1998
14:00 (AEST)

VIS Vipers (Victoria (state))	2–1	(Tasmania) Tassie Van Demons
	Report

Stadium:
State Netball and Hockey Centre, Melbourne

28 June 1998
12:00 (AEST)

ACT Strikers (Australian Capital Territory)	2–2	(Queensland) QLD Scorchers
	Report

Stadium:
The Hockey Centre, Canberra

28 June 1998
15:00 (AEST)

VIS Vipers (Victoria (state))	1–4	(Tasmania) Tassie Van Demons
	Report

Stadium:
State Netball and Hockey Centre, Melbourne

30 June 1998
19:00 (ACST)

Adelaide Suns (South Australia)	1–1	(Tasmania) Tassie Van Demons
	Report

Stadium:
Pines Hockey Stadium, Adelaide

30 June 1998
19:30 (AEST)

NSW Arrows (New South Wales)	1–2	(Queensland) QLD Scorchers
	Report

Stadium:
State Hockey Centre, Sydney

1 July 1998
19:00 (ACST)

Adelaide Suns (South Australia)	1–0	(Tasmania) Tassie Van Demons
	Report

Stadium:
Pines Hockey Stadium, Adelaide

1 July 1998
19:30 (AEST)

NSW Arrows (New South Wales)	2–2	(Queensland) QLD Scorchers
	Report

Stadium:
State Hockey Centre, Sydney

4 July 1998
14:00 (AEST)

QLD Scorchers (Queensland)	2–2	(Victoria (state)) VIS Vipers
	Report

Stadium:
Clyde Park Hockey Stadium, Toowoomba

4 July 1998
14:00 (AWST)

WAIS Diamonds (Western Australia)	4–2	(Tasmania) Tassie Van Demons
	Report

Stadium:
Perth Hockey Stadium, Perth

5 July 1998
14:00 (AEST)

QLD Scorchers (Queensland)	3–2	(Victoria (state)) VIS Vipers
	Report

Stadium:
State Hockey Centre, Brisbane

5 July 1998
14:30 (AWST)

WAIS Diamonds (Western Australia)	4–1	(Tasmania) Tassie Van Demons
	Report

Stadium:
Perth Hockey Stadium, Perth

11 July 1998
14:00 (AEST)

ACT Strikers (Australian Capital Territory)	2–1	(South Australia) Adelaide Suns
	Report

Stadium:
The Hockey Centre, Canberra

11 July 1998
14:00 (AEST)

VIS Vipers (Victoria (state))	2–3	(Western Australia) WAIS Diamonds
	Report

Stadium:
State Netball and Hockey Centre, Melbourne

12 July 1998
14:00 (AEST)

ACT Strikers (Australian Capital Territory)	2–1	(South Australia) Adelaide Suns
	Report

Stadium:
The Hockey Centre, Canberra

12 July 1998
14:00 (AEST)

VIS Vipers (Victoria (state))	2–7	(Western Australia) WAIS Diamonds
	Report

Stadium:
State Netball and Hockey Centre, Melbourne

14 July 1998
15:30 (AEST)

VIS Vipers (Victoria (state))	4–4	(Australian Capital Territory) ACT Strikers
	Report

Stadium:
State Netball and Hockey Centre, Melbourne

14 July 1998
19:30 (AEST)

NSW Arrows (New South Wales)	5–1	(Western Australia) WAIS Diamonds
	Report

Stadium:
State Hockey Centre, Sydney

15 July 1998
15:30 (AEST)

VIS Vipers (Victoria (state))	0–1	(Australian Capital Territory) ACT Strikers
	Report

Stadium:
State Netball and Hockey Centre, Melbourne

15 July 1998
19:30 (AEST)

NSW Arrows (New South Wales)	1–1	(Western Australia) WAIS Diamonds
	Report

Stadium:
State Hockey Centre, Sydney

18 July 1998
13:00 (AEST)

Tassie Van Demons (Tasmania)	2–3	(Australian Capital Territory) ACT Strikers
	Report

Stadium:
Tasmanian Hockey Centre, Hobart

18 July 1998
13:00 (AEST)

QLD Scorchers (Queensland)	4–3	(Western Australia) WAIS Diamonds
	Report

Stadium:
Tweed Heads Hockey Centre, Tweed Heads

19 July 1998
13:00 (AEST)

Tassie Van Demons (Tasmania)	1–1	(Australian Capital Territory) ACT Strikers
	Report

Stadium:
Tasmanian Hockey Centre, Hobart

19 July 1998
13:00 (AEST)

QLD Scorchers (Queensland)	2–2	(Western Australia) WAIS Diamonds
	Report

Stadium:
State Hockey Centre, Brisbane

=== Classification round ===
Semi-finals
25 July 1998
(Western Australia) WAIS Diamonds	2
(Queensland) QLD Scorchers	4
25 July 1998
(Australian Capital Territory) ACT Strikers	0
(New South Wales) NSW Arrows	1

Final
26 July 1998
(Queensland) QLD Scorchers	3
(New South Wales) NSW Arrows (a.e.t)	4
Third place
26 July 1998
(Western Australia) WAIS Diamonds	3
(Australian Capital Territory) ACT Strikers	2

==== Semi-finals ====
25 July 1998
13:00 (AEST)

WAIS Diamonds (Western Australia)	2–4	(Queensland) QLD Scorchers
Andrews 29', 51'	Report	Mott 18'; Free 40', 65'; Callow 58'

Stadium:
State Hockey Centre, Brisbane

25 July 1998
15:00 (AEST)

ACT Strikers (Australian Capital Territory)	0–1	(New South Wales) NSW Arrows
	Report	Annan 41'

Stadium:
State Hockey Centre, Brisbane

==== Third and fourth place ====
26 July 1998
13:00 (AEST)

WAIS Diamonds (Western Australia)	3–2	(Australian Capital Territory) ACT Strikers
Andrews 29', 51', 64'	Report	L. Powell 29'; Dobson 57'

Stadium:
State Hockey Centre, Brisbane

==== Final ====
26 July 1998
15:00 (AEST)

QLD Scorchers (Queensland)	3–4 (a.e.t.)	(New South Wales) NSW Arrows
Fahy 6'; Free 8'; Smith 34'	Report	Booth 46', 62'; Annan 55', 77'

Stadium:
State Hockey Centre, Brisbane

== Awards ==
Player of the League & Top Goalscorer
(Western Australia) Michelle Andrews

== Statistics ==
=== Final standings ===
Pos	Team	Pld	W	D	L	GF	GA	GD	Pts	Qualification
1st place, gold medalist(s)	(New South Wales) NSW Arrows	14	7	5	2	27	19	+8	26	Gold Medal
2nd place, silver medalist(s)	(Queensland) QLD Scorchers	14	5	6	3	31	29	+2	21	Silver Medal
3rd place, bronze medalist(s)	(Western Australia) WAIS Diamonds	14	8	2	4	42	30	+12	26	Bronze Medal
4	(Australian Capital Territory) ACT Strikers	14	6	5	3	26	26	0	23	Fourth place
5	(Tasmania) Tassie Van Demons	12	3	3	6	18	21	−3	12	Eliminated in group stage
6	(Victoria (state)) VIS Vipers	12	3	3	6	25	30	−5	12	Eliminated in group stage
7	(South Australia) Adelaide Suns	12	1	2	9	11	25	−14	5	Eliminated in group stage

Source: Hockey Australia
