= Women's Australian Hockey League =

Field hockey tournament

- Current season, competition or edition: 2018 Women's Australian Hockey League
- Sport: Women's field hockey
- Founded: 1993
- No. of teams: 8
- Continent: Australia (Hockey Australia)
- Most recent champion: (New South Wales) NSW Arrows (10th title)
- Most titles: (New South Wales) NSW Arrows (10 titles)

The Women's Australian Hockey League is highest level field hockey tournament for women in Australia. Until 2016, the annually contested tournament comprised teams from the eight states and territories of Australia.

The 2016 edition of the tournament, held in Perth, Western Australia, included two international teams. Teams from Malaysia and New Zealand competed in the 2016 edition.

The NSW Arrows are the most recent champions, defeating the QLD Scorchers 7–6 in gold medal match of the 2018 AHL.

== Teams ==
Domestic teams

- (Australian Capital Territory) Canberra Strikers
- (New South Wales) NSW Arrows
- (Northern Territory) NT Pearls
- (Queensland) QLD Scorchers
- (South Australia) SA Suns
- (Tasmania) Tassie Van Demons
- (Victoria (state)) VIC Vipers
- (Western Australia) WA Diamonds

International teams

- (India) IND Development
- (Malaysia) MAS Tigress
- (New Zealand) NZL Futures

== Results ==
=== Summaries ===
- Note: The following summaries comprise results from 2002 onwards, while the tournament was founded in 1993.

Year	Hosts	Gold Medal Match			Bronze Medal Match		
Year	Hosts	Champions	Score	Runners-up	3rd place	Score	4th place
1998	Brisbane, QLD	(New South Wales); NSW Arrows	4–3	(Queensland); QLD Scorchers	(Western Australia); WAIS Diamonds	3–2	(Australian Capital Territory); Canberra Strikers
1999	Canberra, ACT	(New South Wales); NSW Arrows	3–0	(Australian Capital Territory); Canberra Strikers	(Queensland); QLD Scorchers	1–0	(South Australia); Adelaide Suns
2000	Sydney, NSW	(New South Wales); NSWIS Arrows	2–1	(Queensland); QAS Scorchers	(Australian Capital Territory); Canberra Strikers	4–2	(Western Australia); WAIS Diamonds
2001	Brisbane, QLD	(New South Wales); NSWIS Arrows	2–1	(Queensland); QLD Scorchers	(Australian Capital Territory); Canberra Strikers	2–0	(Western Australia); WAIS Diamonds
2002	Adelaide, SA	(New South Wales); NSWIS Arrows	4–2	(Queensland); QLD Scorchers	(Australian Capital Territory); Canberra Strikers	3–2	(South Australia); Adelaide Suns
2003	Hobart, TAS	(Victoria (state)); VIS Vipers	3–3 (5–4) (penalties)	(Queensland); QLD Scorchers	(Australian Capital Territory); Canberra Strikers	4–3	(Western Australia); WA Diamonds
2004	Perth, WA	(Western Australia); WA Diamonds	2–1	(Australian Capital Territory); Canberra Strikers	(Queensland); QLD Scorchers	2–0	(New South Wales); NSWIS Arrows
2005	Canberra, ACT	(Queensland); QLD Scorchers	3–1	(Western Australia); WA Diamonds	(New South Wales); NSW Arrows	4–0	(South Australia); Adelaide Suns
2006	Adelaide, SA	(Western Australia); WA Diamonds	4–2	(Queensland); QLD Scorchers	(Australian Capital Territory); Canberra Strikers	2–1	(New South Wales); NSW Arrows
2007	Brisbane, QLD	(Western Australia); WA Diamonds	2–1	(Queensland); QLD Scorchers	(Victoria (state)); VIC Vipers	2–1	(New South Wales); NSW Arrows
2008	Perth, WA	(Western Australia); WA Diamonds	2–0	(Queensland); QLD Scorchers	(Australian Capital Territory); Canberra Strikers	2–0	(New South Wales); NSW Arrows
2009	Melbourne, VIC	(New South Wales); NSW Arrows	5–3	(Queensland); QLD Scorchers	(Western Australia); WA Diamonds	2–0	(Australian Capital Territory); Canberra Strikers
2010	Adelaide, SA	(Western Australia); WA Diamonds	3–1	(Queensland); QLD Scorchers	(New South Wales); NSW Arrows	1–0	(Victoria (state)); VIC Vipers
2011	Darwin, NT	(South Australia); Southern Suns	1–0	(New South Wales); NSW Arrows	(Western Australia); WA Diamonds	4–3	(Queensland); QLD Scorchers
2012	Perth, WA	(Victoria (state)); VIC Vipers	5–1	(New South Wales); NSW Arrows	(Queensland); QLD Scorchers	3–0	(Western Australia); WA Diamonds
2013	Hobart, TAS	(Queensland); QLD Scorchers	0–0 (2–0) (penalties)	(Western Australia); WA Diamonds	(New South Wales); NSW Arrows	5–1	(Australian Capital Territory); Canberra Strikers
2014	Brisbane, QLD	(New South Wales); NSW Arrows	3–2	(Queensland); QLD Scorchers	(Victoria (state)); VIC Vipers	3–0	(Western Australia); WA Diamonds
2015	Sydney, NSW	(Queensland); QLD Scorchers	2–1	(Victoria (state)); VIC Vipers	(New South Wales); NSW Arrows	3–1	(Australian Capital Territory); Canberra Strikers
2016	Perth, WA	(Queensland); QLD Scorchers	3–2	(Victoria (state)); VIC Vipers	(New South Wales); NSW Arrows	2–1	(Australian Capital Territory); Canberra Strikers
2017	Perth, WA	(Victoria (state)); VIC Vipers	2–2 (2–1) (penalties)	(Queensland); QLD Scorchers	(New South Wales); NSW Arrows	3–1	NZL Development
2018	Gold Coast, QLD	(New South Wales); NSW Arrows	7–6	(Queensland); QLD Scorchers	(Australian Capital Territory); Canberra Strikers	4–4 (2–0) (penalties)	(Victoria (state)); VIC Vipers

=== Successful teams ===
- Note: The following table comprises results from 2002 onwards, while the tournament was founded in 1993.

Team	Titles	Runners-up	Third places	Fourth places
(Western Australia) WA Diamonds	2004, 2006, 2007, 2008, 2010	2005, 2013	2009, 2011	2003, 2012, 2014
(Queensland) QLD Scorchers	2005, 2013, 2015, 2016	2002, 2003, 2006, 2007, 2008, 2009, 2010, 2014, 2017, 2018	2004, 2012	2011
(New South Wales) NSW Arrows	2002, 2009, 2014, 2018	2011, 2012	2005, 2010, 2013, 2015, 2016, 2017	2004, 2006, 2007, 2008
(Victoria (state)) VIC Vipers	2003, 2012, 2017	2015, 2016	2007, 2014	2010, 2018
(South Australia) SA Suns	2011			2002, 2005
(Australian Capital Territory) Canberra Strikers		2004	2002, 2003, 2006, 2008, 2018	2009, 2013, 2015, 2016
NZL Development				2017

== Team appearances ==
Team	1998	1999	2000	2001	2002	2003	2004	2005	2006	2007	2008	2009	2010	2011	2012	2013	2014	2015	2016	2017	2018	Total
(Australian Capital Territory) Canberra Strikers	4th	2nd	3rd	3rd	3rd	3rd	2nd	5th	3rd	5th	3rd	4th	6th	5th	5th	4th	5th	4th	4th	6th	3rd	21
(New South Wales) NSW Arrows	1st	1st	1st	1st	1st	5th	4th	3rd	4th	4th	4th	1st	3rd	2nd	2nd	3rd	1st	3rd	3rd	3rd	1st	21
(Northern Territory) NT Pearls	–	–	8th	8th	8th	8th	5th	7th	7th	7th	8th	7th	8th	7th	7th	8th	7th	7th	10th	8th	7th	19
(Queensland) QLD Scorchers	2nd	3rd	2nd	2nd	2nd	2nd	3rd	1st	2nd	2nd	2nd	2nd	2nd	4th	3rd	1st	2nd	1st	1st	2nd	2nd	21
(South Australia) SA Suns	7th	4th	7th	7th	4th	6th	6th	4th	5th	8th	5th	6th	5th	1st	6th	6th	6th	6th	9th	7th	6th	21
(Tasmania) Tassie Van Demons	5th	5th	5th	6th	7th	7th	8th	8th	8th	6th	6th	8th	7th	8th	8th	7th	8th	8th	8th	10th	8th	21
(Victoria (state)) VIC Vipers	6th	6th	6th	5th	6th	1st	7th	6th	6th	3rd	7th	5th	4th	6th	1st	5th	3rd	2nd	2nd	1st	4th	21
(Western Australia) WA Diamonds	3rd	7th	4th	4th	5th	4th	1st	2nd	1st	1st	1st	3rd	1st	3rd	4th	2nd	4th	5th	5th	5th	5th	21
Malaysia Tigress	–	–	–	–	–	–	–	–	–	–	–	–	–	–	–	–	–	–	7th	–	–	1
NZL Development	–	–	–	–	–	–	–	–	–	–	–	–	–	–	–	–	–	–	6th	4th	–	2
IND Development	–	–	–	–	–	–	–	–	–	–	–	–	–	–	–	–	–	–	–	9th	–	1
Total	7	7	8	8	8	8	8	8	8	8	8	8	8	8	8	8	8	8	10	10	8	170

== Statistics ==
Women's Australian Hockey League
Year	Champion	Runner-up	Player of the Tournament	Highest Goalscorer	Player of the Final
1993	NSW Arrows	ACTAS Strikers	Lisa Powell (Strikers)	–	–
1994	WAIS Diamonds	QAS Scorchers	Rechelle Hawkes (Diamonds)	–	–
1995	Adelaide Suns	NSW Arrows	Renita Farrell (Scorchers)	–	–
1996	NSW Arrows	WAIS Diamonds	Alyson Annan (Arrows)	–	–
1997	QAS Scorchers	Canberra Strikers	Alyson Annan (Arrows)	–	–
1998	NSW Arrows	QLD Scorchers	Michelle Andrews (Diamonds)	–	–
1999	NSW Arrows	Canberra Strikers	Katrina Powell (Strikers)	Katrina Powell (Strikers)	Melanie Twitt (Arrows)
2000	NSW Arrows	QAS Scorchers	Katrina Powell (Strikers)	–	Karen Smith (Scorchers)
2001	NSW Arrows	QLD Scorchers	Melanie Twitt (Arrows)	Nicole Hudson (Scorchers)	Nina Bonner (Arrows)
2002	NSW Arrows	QLD Scorchers	Louise Dobson (Vipers)	Nicole Hudson (Scorchers)	–
2003	VIS Vipers	QLD Scorchers	Carmel Bakurski (Suns)	Katrina Powell (Strikers)	Rachel Imison (Vipers)
2004	WA Diamonds	Canberra Strikers	Emily Halliday (Diamonds); Sarah Taylor (Strikers)	Hope Brown (Scorchers)	Emily Halliday (Diamonds)
2005	QLD Scorchers	WA Diamonds	Rachel Imison (Vipers)	Suzie Faulkner (Scorchers)	Madonna Blyth (Scorchers)
2006	WA Diamonds	QLD Scorchers	Peta Gallagher (Strikers)	Peta Gallagher (Strikers)	Emily Halliday (Diamonds)
2007	WA Diamonds	QLD Scorchers	Rebecca Sanders (Arrows)	Suzie Faulkner (Scorchers)	Kim Walker (Diamonds)
2008	WA Diamonds	QLD Scorchers	Madonna Blyth (Scorchers)	Sian Smithson (Diamonds)	Kobie McGurk (Diamonds)
2009	NSW Arrows	QLD Scorchers	Hope Munro (Diamonds)	Emily Hurtz (Arrows)	Fiona Johnson (Arrows)
2010	WA Diamonds	QLD Scorchers	Madonna Blyth (Scorchers)	Ashleigh Nelson (Diamonds)	Ashleigh Nelson (Diamonds)
2011	Southern Suns	NSW Arrows	Jodie Schulz (Scorchers)	Ashleigh Nelson (Diamonds); Sofie McLeod (Van Demons)	Kayla Sharland (Suns)
2012	VIC Vipers	NSW Arrows	Anna Flanagan (Strikers)	Renee Ashton (Scorchers)	Claire Messent (Vipers)
2013	QLD Scorchers	WA Diamonds	Karri McMahon (Suns)	Hollie Webster (Arrows)	Penny Squibb (Diamonds)
2014	NSW Arrows	QLD Scorchers	Casey Sablowski (Arrows)	Jodie Kenny (Scorchers)	Casey Sablowski (Arrows)
2015	QLD Scorchers	VIC Vipers	Jane Claxton (Suns)	Emily Hurtz (Vipers)	Rachael Lynch (Vipers)
2016	QLD Scorchers	VIC Vipers	Georgia Nanscawen (Vipers)	Emily Hurtz (Vipers)	Jordyn Holzberger (Scorchers)
2017	VIC Vipers	QLD Scorchers	Stephanie Kershaw (Scorchers)	Emily Smith (Arrows); Penny Squibb (Diamonds); Emily Hurtz (Vipers)	Rachael Lynch (Vipers)
2018	NSW Arrows	QLD Scorchers	Elena Tice (Strikers); Lily Brazel (Vipers)	Rebecca Greiner (Scorchers); Jodie Kenny (Scorchers); Emily Hurtz (Vipers)	Kaitlin Nobbs (Arrows)

Women's Australian Hockey League
Year	Goalkeeper of the Tournament	Play the Whistle
2012	–	WA Diamonds
2013	Ashlee Wells (Diamonds)	–
2014	–	–
2015	Rachael Lynch (Vipers)	–
2016	Clare Comerford (Scorchers)	NZL Futures
2017	Rachael Lynch (Vipers)	VIC Vipers
2018	Rachael Lynch (Vipers)	–
