= 2015 Women's Australian Hockey League =

Tournament details
- Host country: Australia
- City: Sydney
- Teams: 8
- Venue: Sydney Olympic Park

Final positions
- Champions: (Queensland) QLD Scorchers (5th title)
- Runner-up: (Victoria (state)) VIC Vipers
- Third place: (New South Wales) NSW Arrows

Tournament statistics
- Matches played: 24
- Goals scored: 97 (4.04 per match)
- Top scorer: (Victoria (state)) Emily Hurtz (6 goals)
- Best player: (South Australia) Jane Claxton

The 2015 Women's Australian Hockey League was the 23rd edition of the women's field hockey tournament. The tournament was held in the New South Wales city of Sydney.

The Queensland Scorchers won the gold medal for the fifth time by defeating the Victorian Vipers 2–1 in the final.

== Competition format ==
The tournament is divided into two pools, Pool A and Pool B, consisting of four teams in a round robin format. Teams then progress into either Pool C, the medal round, or Pool D, the classification round. Teams carry over points from their previous match ups, and contest teams they are yet to play.

The top two teams in each of pools A and B then progress to Pool C. The top two teams in Pool C continue to contest the Final, while the bottom two teams of Pool C play in the Third and Fourth place match.

The remaining bottom placing teams make up Pool D. The top two teams in Pool D play in the Fifth and Sixth place match, while the bottom two teams of Pool C play in the Seventh and Eighth place match.

== Teams ==
- (Australian Capital Territory) Canberra Strikers
- New South Wales Arrows
- (Northern Territory) NT Pearls
- Queensland Scorchers
- (South Australia) SA Suns
- (Tasmania) Tassie Van Demons
- (Victoria (state)) Victorian Vipers
- (Western Australia) WA Diamonds

== Results ==
=== First round ===
==== Pool A ====
Pos	Team	Pld	W	D	L	GF	GA	GD	Pts	Qualification
1	(Queensland) NSW Arrows	3	3	0	0	13	2	+11	9	Advance to Medal Round
2	(Australian Capital Territory) Canberra Strikers	3	2	0	1	6	3	+3	6	Advance to Medal Round
3	(Western Australia) WA Diamonds	3	1	0	2	5	7	−2	3	
4	(Tasmania) Tassie Van Demons	3	0	0	3	1	13	−12	0	

Source: Hockey Australia

25 September 2015
17:00

WA Diamonds (Western Australia)	2–0	(Tasmania) Tassie Van Demons
Lammers 45'; Slattery 52'	Report

Umpires:
Bernadette Pangrazio (AUS)
Rhianon Fernando (AUS)

25 September 2015
19:00

NSW Arrows (New South Wales)	1–0	(Australian Capital Territory) Canberra Strikers
Williams 52'	Report

Umpires:
Sarah Allanson (AUS)
Aleisha Neumann (AUS)

26 September 2015
17:00

NSW Arrows (New South Wales)	7–0	(Tasmania) Tassie Van Demons
Hayes 4'; Smith 6', 54'; Williams 36'; Simpson 53'; Stewart 56'; Brazel 60'	Report

Umpires:
Emily Carroll (AUS)
Aleisha Neumann (AUS)

26 September 2015
19:00

Canberra Strikers (Australian Capital Territory)	2–1	(Western Australia) WA Diamonds
Gray 52'; Bailey-Price 55'	Report	Slattery 22'

Umpires:
Kylie Seymour (AUS)
Bernadette Pangrazio (AUS)

28 September 2015
13:00

Canberra Strikers (Australian Capital Territory)	4–1	(Tasmania) Tassie Van Demons
Flanagan 1', 34', 37'; Bone 57'	Report	McCambridge 44'

Umpires:
Michelle Pecar (AUS)
Janelle Bond (AUS)

28 September 2015
15:00

NSW Arrows (New South Wales)	5–2	(Western Australia) WA Diamonds
Stewart 6'; Farrell 13'; Morgan 36'; Smith 45'; Jenner 48'	Report	Lammers 40'; Slattery 58'

Umpires:
Rhiannon Murrie (AUS)
Emily Carroll (AUS)

==== Pool B ====
Pos	Team	Pld	W	D	L	GF	GA	GD	Pts	Qualification
1	(Victoria (state)) VIC Vipers	3	3	0	0	7	0	+7	9	Advance to Medal Round
2	(Queensland) NSW Arrows	3	2	0	1	11	3	+8	6	Advance to Medal Round
3	(South Australia) SA Suns	3	1	0	2	6	5	+1	3	
4	(Tasmania) Tassie Van Demons	3	0	0	3	1	17	−16	0	

Source: Hockey Australia

25 September 2015
13:00

VIC Vipers (Victoria (state))	3–0	(Northern Territory) NT Pearls
Messent 3', 43'; Hurtz 32'	Report

Umpires:
Kylie Seymour (AUS)
Emily Carroll (AUS)

25 September 2015
15:00

QLD Scorchers (Queensland)	2–1	(South Australia) SA Suns
Kenny 6'; Blyth 22'	Report	Nance 19'

Umpires:
Melissa Trivic (AUS)
Michelle Pecar (AUS)

26 September 2015
13:00

QLD Scorchers (Queensland)	9–0	(Northern Territory) NT Pearls
J. Dwyer 10'; Allendorf 17', 24', 34'; Kenny 23', 30'; S. Fitzpatrick 42'; M. Fitzpatrick 48'; Taylor 54'	Report

Umpires:
Rhiannon Murrie (AUS)
Janelle Bond (AUS)

26 September 2015
15:00

SA Suns (South Australia)	0–2	(Victoria (state)) VIC Vipers
	Report	Hurtz 35'; Nanscawen 45'

Umpires:
Michelle Pecar (AUS)
Sarah Allanson (AUS)

28 September 2015
17:00

SA Suns (South Australia)	5–1	(Northern Territory) NT Pearls
Busiko 2'; Welstead 23'; McMahon 47', 55'; Parker 57'	Report	Richards 5'

Umpires:
Aleisha Neumann (AUS)
Rhianon Fernando (AUS)

28 September 2015
19:00

QLD Scorchers (Queensland)	0–2	(Victoria (state)) Victorian Vipers
	Report	Nanscawen 34'; Hurtz 47'

Umpires:
Melissa Trivic (AUS)
Sarah Allanson (AUS)

=== Second round ===
==== Pool C (Medal round) ====
Pos	Team	Pld	W	D	L	GF	GA	GD	Pts
1	(Queensland) QLD Scorchers	3	2	0	1	8	5	+3	6
2	(Victoria (state)) VIC Vipers	3	2	0	1	7	4	+3	6
3	(New South Wales) NSW Arrows	3	2	0	1	5	4	+1	6
4	(Australian Capital Territory) Canberra Strikers	3	0	0	3	3	10	−7	0

Source: Hockey Australia

29 September 2015
17:00

Canberra Strikers (Australian Capital Territory)	2–6	(Queensland) QLD Scorchers
Gray 24', 52'	Report	M. Fitzpatrick 6'; Allendorf 15', 32'; S. Fitzpatrick 29', 58'; Kershaw 48'

Umpires:
Aleisha Neumann (AUS)
Kylie Seymour (AUS)

29 September 2015
19:00

NSW Arrows (New South Wales)	3–2	(Victoria (state)) VIC Vipers
Hanna 5', 8'; Stewart 18'	Report	Taylor 15'; Nanscawen 30'

Umpires:
Emily Carroll (AUS)
Melissa Trivic (AUS)

1 October 2015
17:00

VIC Vipers (Victoria (state))	3–1	(Australian Capital Territory) Canberra Strikers
Hurtz 4', 34'; Messent 12'	Report	Evans 7'

Umpires:
Melissa Trivic (AUS)
Bernadette Pangrazio (AUS)

1 October 2015
19:00

NSW Arrows (New South Wales)	1–2	(Queensland) QLD Scorchers
Stewart 22'	Report	Kenny 33'; J. Dwyer 59'

Umpires:
Janelle Bond (AUS)
Rhiannon Murrie (AUS)

==== Pool D (Classification round) ====
Pos	Team	Pld	W	D	L	GF	GA	GD	Pts
1	(Western Australia) WA Diamonds	3	3	0	0	9	2	+7	9
2	(South Australia) SA Suns	3	2	0	1	9	5	+4	6
3	(Tasmania) Tassie Van Demons	3	1	0	2	2	4	−2	3
4	(Northern Territory) NT Pearls	3	0	0	3	1	10	−9	0

Source: Hockey Australia

29 September 2015
13:00

Tassie Van Demons (Tasmania)	1–0	(Northern Territory) NT Pearls
Brennan 12'	Report

Umpires:
Rhiannon Murrie (AUS)
Bernadette Pangrazio (AUS)

29 September 2015
15:00

WA Diamonds (Western Australia)	3–2	(South Australia) SA Suns
Lammers 3'; Slattery 20'; Flynn 36'	Report	Parker 9'; Grist 43'

Umpires:
Janelle Bond (AUS)
Rhianon Fernando (AUS)

1 October 2015
13:00

SA Suns (South Australia)	2–1	(Tasmania) Tassie Van Demons
van Bodegom 9'; McMahon 20'	Report	Hinton 48'

Umpires:
Kylie Seymour (AUS)
Michelle Pecar (AUS)

1 October 2015
15:00

WA Diamonds (Western Australia)	4–0	(Northern Territory) NT Pearls
Esslemont 8'; Nelson 20', 29'; Squibb 45'	Report

Umpires:
Sarah Allanson (AUS)
Rhianon Fernando (AUS)

=== Classification games ===
==== Seventh and eighth place ====
2 October 2015
13:00

Tassie Van Demons (Tasmania)	2–2	(Northern Territory) NT Pearls
Newlyn 29'; Spence 60'	Report	Swann 35'; Patterson 45'
Penalties
Spence (penalty shoot-out missed); McCambridge (penalty shoot-out missed); Murphy (penalty shoot-out missed); Donovan (penalty shoot-out missed); Calvert (penalty shoot-out scored) —— Calvert (penalty shoot-out missed)	1–2	(penalty shoot-out missed) Swann; (penalty shoot-out missed) Scriven; (penalty shoot-out missed) Peris; (penalty shoot-out scored) Divall; (penalty shoot-out missed) Richards —— (penalty shoot-out scored) Peris

Umpires:
Sarah Allanson (AUS)
Bernadette Pangrazio (AUS)

==== Fifth and sixth place ====
2 October 2015
15:00

WA Diamonds (Western Australia)	2–1	(South Australia) SA Suns
Wilson 7'; Denning 25'	Report	Busiko 4'

Umpires:
Janelle Bond (AUS)
Rhiannon Murrie (AUS)

==== Third and fourth place ====
2 October 2015
17:00

NSW Arrows (New South Wales)	3–1	(Australian Capital Territory) Canberra Strikers
Jenner 12'; Smith 52', 56'	Report	Watson 49'

Umpires:
Aleisha Neumann (AUS)
Emily Carroll (AUS)

==== Final ====
2 October 2015
19:00

QLD Scorchers (Queensland)	2–1	(Victoria (state)) VIC Vipers
Kenny 21'; Blyth 32'	Report	Hurtz 4'

Umpires:
Kylie Seymour (AUS)
Melissa Trivic (AUS)

== Awards ==
Best Player	Topscorer	Player of the Final	Best Goalkeeper
(South Australia) Jane Claxton	(Victoria (state)) Emily Hurtz	(Victoria (state)) Rachael Lynch	(Victoria (state)) Rachael Lynch

== Statistics ==
=== Final standings ===
Pos	Team	Pld	W	D	L	GF	GA	GD	Pts	Final Result
1st place, gold medalist(s)	Queensland Scorchers	6	5	0	1	21	7	+14	15	Gold Medal
2nd place, silver medalist(s)	(Victoria (state)) Victorian Vipers	6	4	0	2	13	6	+7	12	Silver Medal
3rd place, bronze medalist(s)	New South Wales Arrows	6	5	0	1	20	7	+13	15	Bronze Medal
4	(Australian Capital Territory) Canberra Strikers	6	2	0	4	10	15	−5	6	Fourth Place
5	(Western Australia) WA Diamonds	6	4	0	2	14	10	+4	12	Fifth Place
6	(South Australia) SA Suns	6	2	0	4	11	11	0	6	Sixth Place
7	(Northern Territory) NT Pearls	6	0	1	5	3	24	−21	1	Seventh Place
8	(Tasmania) Tassie Van Demons	6	1	1	4	5	17	−12	4	Eighth Place

=== Goalscorers ===
6 Goals

- (Victoria (state)) Emily Hurtz

5 Goals

- (New South Wales) Emily Smith
- (Queensland) Murphy Allendorf
- (Queensland) Jodie Kenny

4 Goals

- (New South Wales) Grace Stewart
- (Western Australia) Kathryn Slattery

3 Goals

- (Australian Capital Territory) Anna Flanagan
- (Australian Capital Territory) Laura Gray
- (Queensland) Savannah Fitzpatrick
- (South Australia) Karri McMahon
- (Victoria (state)) Claire Messent
- (Victoria (state)) Georgia Nanscawen
- (Western Australia) Kim Lammers

2 Goals

- (New South Wales) Kate Hanna
- (New South Wales) Kate Jenner
- (New South Wales) Mariah Williams
- (Queensland) Jill Dwyer
- (Queensland) Madison Fitzpatrick
- (Queensland) Madonna Blyth
- (South Australia) Anna Busiko
- (South Australia) Georgie Parker
- (Western Australia) Ashleigh Nelson

1 Goal

- (Australian Capital Territory) Catriona Bailey-Price
- (Australian Capital Territory) Edwina Bone
- (Australian Capital Territory) Shelley Watson
- (Australian Capital Territory) Naomi Evans
- (New South Wales) Lily Brazel
- (New South Wales) Lisa Farrell
- (New South Wales) Greta Hayes
- (New South Wales) Georgina Morgan
- (New South Wales) Cara Simpson
- (Northern Territory) Mikaela Patterson
- (Northern Territory) Amy Swann
- (Northern Territory) Tegan Richards
- (Queensland) Stephanie Kershaw
- (Queensland) Renee Taylor
- (South Australia) Gabrielle Nance
- (South Australia) Emily Grist
- (South Australia) Charlotte van Bodegom
- (South Australia) Leah Welstead
- (Tasmania) Amelia Spence
- (Tasmania) Elanor Brennan
- (Tasmania) Madeleine Newlyn
- (Tasmania) Madeleine Hinton
- (Tasmania) Sarah McCambridge
- (Victoria (state)) Sophie Taylor
- (Western Australia) Kate Denning
- (Western Australia) Jess Esslemont
- (Western Australia) Erin Flynn
- (Western Australia) Penny Squibb
- (Western Australia) Georgia Wilson
