= Sarah O'Conner =

Australian field hockey player (born 1984)

Sarah O'Connor (born 20 November 1984) is an Australian field hockey player.
