= Tammy Cole =

Australian field hockey player

Personal information
- Born: 13 April 1973 (age 53)
Medal record
Women's field hockey
Representing Australia
Commonwealth Games
Bronze medal – third place	2002 Manchester	Team competition

Tammy Cole (born 13 April 1973 in Queensland) is a retired female field hockey defender from Australia.

She was a member of the Hockeyroos at the 2002 Commonwealth Games in Manchester, where the team ended up in third place in the overall-rankings.
