= Bianca Langham-Pritchard =

Australian field hockey international (born 1975)

Personal information
- Born: 29 May 1975 (age 51) Hobart, Tasmania, Australia
- Height: 178 cm (5 ft 10 in)

Sport
- Sport: Field hockey
- Position: Defender
Senior career
Years	Team	Caps	Goals
–	Van Demons	-	-
National team
Years	Team	Caps	Goals
1994–present	Australia		-
Medal record
Representing Australia
Gold medal – first place	World Cup	1998
Gold medal – first place	Champions Trophy	1999
Silver medal – second place	Champions Trophy	2000
Commonwealth Games
Bronze medal – third place	2002 Manchester	2002
- Updated on 27 January 2010

Bianca Langham-Pritchard (born 29 May 1975) is a former Australian field hockey international. She was part of the 1998 World Cup-winning Australian team.

Born in Hobart, Tasmania, Langham-Pritchard was first selected for the Australian national women's team, the Hockeyroos, in November 1994. She was a member of the 1996 and 2000 Olympic Training Squads, but did not make the final team. In 1998, she won gold at both the World Cup and the Commonwealth Games. Langham-Pritchard played her 100th game for Australia in 1999.
