= Tasmanian Hockey Centre =

Stadium in Hobart, Tasmania

- Interactive map of Tasmanian Hockey Centre
- Location: 1 Bell Street, New Town, Tasmania, 7008
- Coordinates: 42°51′14″S 147°18′51″E
- Owner: Government of Australia
- Operator: Hockey Tasmania
- Capacity: 600 (fixed)

Tenants
- Hockey Tasmania; AHL (1991–2018): Tassie Tigers (M) and Tassie Van Demons (W); Hockey One (2019–): Tassie Tigers (M + W)

The Tasmanian Hockey Centre is a government-owned outdoor field hockey stadium located in New Town, Tasmania, a northern suburb of Hobart. It offers three international standard water-based hockey pitches which are used for both international and domestic competition, as well as training activities.

The stadium is home to the Tassie Tigers men's and women's hockey teams in Hockey Australia's premier domestic league, the Sultana Bran Hockey One League.

== Facilities ==
=== Pitches ===
The Tasmanian Hockey Centre houses three international water-based pitches. The two main pitches are separated by the main building.

=== Function rooms ===
The Tasmanian Hockey Centre is home to 'The Function Centre', a public café. In addition to this, the Function Centre can also host large functions, with a choice of private function rooms housed within the complex.

== Hockey ==
=== National competitions ===
The Tasmanian Hockey Centre has played host to a number of national championships. The centre most recently hosted home matches for the Tassie Tigers in the Sultana Bran Hockey One League in the league's inaugural editions.

=== International competitions ===
In addition to national competition, the centre has also hosted international competitions on a number of occasions, including:

- 2001 Men's FIH Junior World Cup.
- 2011 Men's and Women's editions of the Oceania Cup.
- 2019 Men's and Women's editions of the FIH Pro League
