= Sarah Young (field hockey) =

Australian field hockey player

Sarah Taylor
Personal information
- Born: 19 October 1981 (age 44) Canberra, Australia
Medal record
Women's field hockey
Representing Australia
World Cup
Silver medal – second place	2006 Madrid	Team competition
Commonwealth Games
Gold medal – first place	2006 Melbourne	Team competition

Sarah Young (née Taylor; born 19 October 1981 in Canberra, Australian Capital Territory) is a female field hockey midfielder from Australia. She made her debut for the Australian women's national team during the 2001 season (Korea Telecom Cup). Young was a member of the Hockeyroos at the 2006 Commonwealth Games in Melbourne, where the team ended up in first place in the overall rankings. She also was selected to play in the 2008 Beijing Olympics.
