= Victorian Vipers =

Australian field hockey team

- City: Melbourne
- League: Australian Hockey League
- Founded: 1993; 33 years ago
- Home arena: State Netball and Hockey Centre
- Colours: Navy Blue, White & Orange
- Head coach: Tim Strapp
- Captain: Stacia Joseph

The Victorian Vipers are a field hockey team who participate in Australia's national field hockey league, the WAHL. The team is predominantly made up of amateurs who participate in the Victorian Premier League competition. The team's home stadium is the Victorian State Netball and Hockey Centre, and in 1993 the women's competition was included in the AHL. The Victorian Vipers have experienced varying levels of success including winning two national championships. These two championships came in the 2003 and 2012 competitions.

2015 Victorian Vipers hockey team
Players	Coaching staff
Kathryn Williams (Goalkeeper); Georgia Nanscawen; Stacia Joseph (Captain); Sophie Taylor; Claire Messent; Kary Chau; Danielle Schubach; Hana Peake; Hannah Cohen; Sarah O'Connor; Laura Barden; Laura Desmet; Emily Hurtz; Meg Pearce; Hayley Padget; Samantha Snow; Lucy Ockenden; Rachael Lynch (Captain & Goalkeeper)	Head coach: Tim Strapp; Assistant coach: Mark Taylor; Team manager: Dale Wells; Performance analyst: Codey Moran; Physio: Sharon Wilkins

== 2014 Team ==
- Laura Barden
- Kristina Bates
- Pauline Brugts
- Kary Chau
- Hannah Cohen
- Laura Desmet
- Hannah Gravenall
- Stacia Joseph
- Maud Lelkens (GK)
- Rachel Lynch (GK)
- Alana McQueen
- Georgia Nanscawen
- Lucy Ockenden
- Hayley Padget
- Meg Pearce
- Danielle Schubach
- Samantha Snow
- Sophie Taylor

== 2013 Team ==
Rachael Lynch Goalkeeper

Alana Butler Goalkeeper

Megan Berriman Defender

Carla Bond Defender

Steph Doutre Defender

Samantha Snow Defender

Stacia Joseph Midfield

Anna Burns Midfield

Meg Pearce Midfield

Kary Chau Midfield

Hannah Cohen Midfield

Claire Messent Midfield

Hana Peake Midfield

Danielle Schubach Midfield

Hayley Padget Midfield

Laura Barden Striker

Laura Desmet Striker

Stephanie Riordan Striker

The team competed in Hobart, Tasmania from 28 September to 5 October 2013.

== 2013 Staff ==
Coach: Victor Romagosa

Assistant Coach: Katie Allen

Assistant Coach: Greg Drake

Team Manager: Natalie Joiner

Physiotherapist: Sharon Wilkins

Sports Scientist: Kylie Thomas

Strength and Conditioning: Nathan Heaney

== 2003 Team (National Champions) ==
Jessica Monkivich

Amanda Gillon

Rachel Imison (Aus - GK)

Fiona Allen (GK)

Justine Hiskins

Joanne Grunden

Linda Harvey

Louise Dobson (Aus)

Ngaire Smith (Aus)

Tamsin Nelson

Emily Riordan

Kirsten Thompson

Leah Merrett

Renee Trost

Rebecca Eastman (Thompson)

Denise Duraski

Adele Brazenor

The team competed in the Australian Hockey league home & away style of championship and won the National Championship

== 2003 Staff ==
Coach: Toni Cumpston

Team Manager: Natalie Joiner

== Notable players ==
Notable Victorian Vipers players which have represented the Hockeyroos at the Olympics include Louise Dobson, Rachel Imison and Georgia Nanscawen.

== Previous coaches ==
John Mowat 1994-2001

Toni Cumpston 2001-08

Katie Allen 2009-12

== Stadium ==
The team's home ground is the State Netball and Hockey Centre which is located within a kilometre of the Melbourne CBD. The stadium has a capacity of about 4,500 with 1000 seats however capacity is expanded through temporary seating for big tournaments. The stadium was used for the 2006 Commonwealth games, as well as the 2009 and 2012 Champions Trophy.
