= Queensland Scorchers =

Australian field hockey club

- League: Australian Hockey League
- Founded: 1993
- Home arena: Queensland State Hockey Centre
- Colours: Maroon, Yellow
- Head coach: Lee Bodimeade

The OAMPS Queensland Scorchers are an Australian women's field hockey team based in Queensland that play in the Australian Hockey League. In the 2014 season, they were the runners-up to the NSW Arrows. They also won the 2013 Australian Hockey League Premiership, as well as the 2015 AHL Premiership. In 2016 they made it back-to-back premierships, beating Victoria in the final. When they again met Victoria in the 2017 final, the two teams were level at full time. The match then went to shoot outs, with Victoria coming away with the championship.

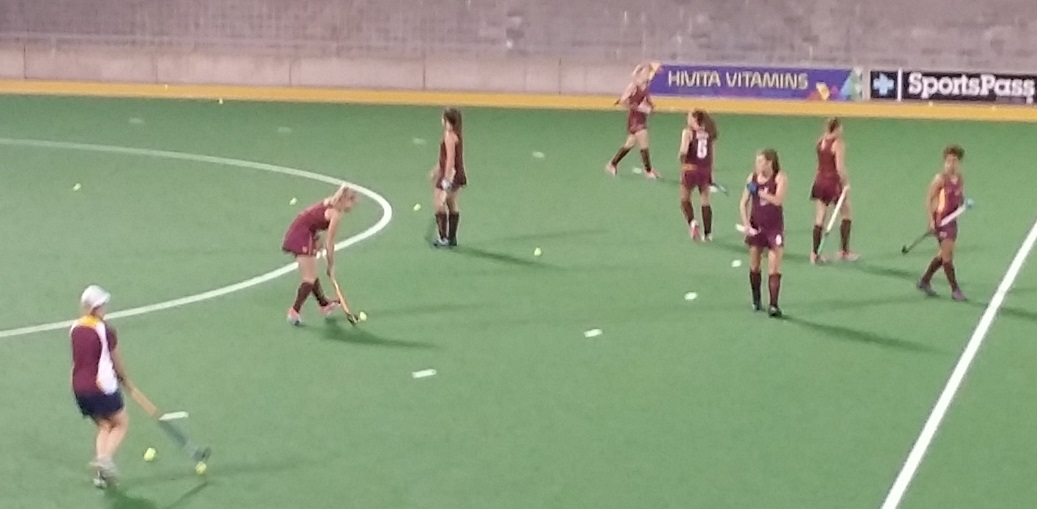
Queensland Scorchers warming up before the 2015 AHL Final against the Victorian Vipers, 2 October 2015.

== Current roster ==
The following is the Queensland Scorchers team roster for the 2017 AHL:

Head coach: Lee Bodimeade

1. Savannah Fitzpatrick
2. Madison Fitzpatrick
4. Ashlea Fey
5. Ambrosia Malone
6. Kirstin Dwyer
8. Jordyn Holzberger
10. Madeline James
11. Tegan Richards
12. Stephanie Kershaw
13. Rebecca Greiner
14. Morgan Gallagher
15. Hannah Astbury (GK)
16. Clare Comerford (GK)
18. Jamie Stone
20. Britt Noffke
21. Kazzia Lammon
22. Britt Wilkinson
27. Renee Taylor
