= Nikki Hudson =

Australian field hockey player

Personal information
- Born: 6 July 1976 (age 49)
Medal record
Women's field hockey
Representing Australia
Olympic Games
| Gold medal – first place | 2000 Sydney | Team |
World Cup
| Gold medal – first place | 1998 Utrecht | Team |
| Silver medal – second place | 2006 Madrid | Team |
Champions Trophy
| Gold medal – first place | 1995 Mar del Plata | Team |
| Gold medal – first place | 1997 Berlin | Team |
| Gold medal – first place | 1999 Brisbane | Team |
| Silver medal – second place | 2005 Canberra | Team |
| Bronze medal – third place | 2000 Amstelveen | Team |
| Bronze medal – third place | 2001 Amstelveen | Team |
Commonwealth Games
| Gold medal – first place | 1998 Kuala Lumpur | Team |
| Gold medal – first place | 2006 Melbourne | Team |
| Bronze medal – third place | 2002 Manchester | Team |

Nicole Elaine Hudson OAM (née Mott; born 6 July 1976) is an Australian former women's field hockey player. She was the captain of the Hockeyroos, Australia's national women's team, until her retirement from international hockey in 2009. She made her debut for Australia in 1993 and won gold at the 2000 Sydney Olympics. Her AHL team is the Queensland Scorchers.

At the 2008 Summer Olympics, she scored in Australia's first two games, scoring the second goal in an comeback to win 5–4 against Korea, and a skillful individual effort against Spain. The goal against Spain was her 98th international goal, in her 299th international appearance. Her 99th goal for Australia came against South Africa in the following match. The match was Hudson's 300th appearance for her country, as she became the first woman to play 300 international Hockey matches for Australia.

== Sponsorship ==
Hudson put her name to special editions of the Mazon Black Magic stick, featuring a special black-and-pink colour scheme.

== Media work ==
Following her retirement from international hockey in 2009, Hudson was employed by One HD and Channel Ten for the women's hockey matches at the 2010 Commonwealth Games in Dehli, and appeared on Good News Week in the leadup to the event as a cross-promotion.
