= WA Diamonds =

Australian field hockey club

- City: Perth, Western Australia
- League: Australian Hockey League
- Founded: 1993; 33 years ago
- Home arena: Perth Hockey Stadium
- Colours: Yellow, black
- Head coach: Suzanne Teverios
- Captain: Ashleigh Nelson

The WA Diamonds are a women's field hockey team based in Perth, Western Australia. The team compete in the women's division of the Australian Hockey League (AHL).

== History ==
Originally known as the WAIS Diamonds, the team first competed in the AHL in 1993, changing names to WA Diamonds in 2003. They have won the AHL title 6 times, in years 1994, 2004, 2006, 2007, 2008 and 2010.

== 2010 WA Diamonds hockey team ==
2010 WA Diamonds hockey team
Players	Coaches
Fiona Boyce; Ashleigh Nelson; Chantelle Ciallella; Shayni Nelson; Harriet Collins; Sian Nelson; Paige Collins; Caitlin Pascov; Eloise Crombie; Tania Perpoli; Kate Denning; Alessia Robinson; Lisa Eglington; Courtney Robinson; Sam Gale; Katelyn Smith; Kate Hubble; Kate Symons; Shelly Liddelow; Jayde Taylor; Kobie McGurk; Kim Walker; Hope Munro; Holly White	Head coach: Neil Hawgood; Assistant coach: Grant Mitton/Steven Boyce; Manager: Hayley Patton; Physiotherapist: Rowena Kendall

== 2011 WA Diamonds hockey team ==
2011 WA Diamonds hockey team
Players	Coaches
Ashlyn Ahrens; Ashleigh Nelson; Karla Barrett; Shayni Nelson; Fiona Boyce; Sian Nelson; Chantelle Ciallella; Caitlin Pascov; Jane Clarkson; Alessia Robinson; Harriet Collins; Courtney Robinson; Kate Denning; Jodie Searle; Claire Ellis; Kathryn Slattery; Kate Hubble; Katelyn Smith; Shelly Liddelow; Kate Symons; Kobie McGurk; Jayde Taylor; Kate Mead; Roberta Walton; Hope Munro	Head coach: Neil Hawgood; Assistant coach: Russell Lee; Manager: Emily Halliday/ Kim Walker/ Grant Mitton; Physiotherapist: Rowena Kendall; Video Analyst: Brad Ladyman/ Mal Cowan/ Matt Mellor

== 2012 WA Diamonds hockey team ==
2012 WA Diamonds hockey team
Players	Coaches
Jemma Buckley; Jodie Searle; Kate Denning; Kate Siddell; Lisa Eglington; Kathryn Slattery; Claire Ellis; Katelyn Smith; Kate Hubble; Kersten Smith; Heather Langham; Penny Squibb; Kobie McGurk; Katy Symons; Ashleigh Nelson; Holly White; Caitlin Pascov; Georgia Wilson	Head coach: Russell Lee; Assistant coach: Tate Napier; Manager: Susan Clark; Physiotherapist: Liz Perry; Video Analyst: Mal Cowan

== 2013 WA Diamonds hockey team ==
2013 WA Diamonds hockey team
Players	Coaches
Jemma Buckley; Ashleigh Nelson; Olivia Chui; Shayni Nelson; Paige Collins; Airlie Ogilvie; Kate Denning; Caitlin Pascov; Jess Esslemont; Jodie Searle; Kyra Flynn; Penny Squibb; Rachel Frusher; Katy Symons; Shelly Liddelow; Jayde Taylor; Kobie McGurk; Ashlee Wells	Head coach: Jason Butcher; Assistant coach: Tate Napier; Manager: Susan Dickson; Physiotherapist: Jodie Slater; Video Analyst: Laurie Tyler

== 2014 WA Diamonds hockey team ==
2014 WA Diamonds hockey team
Players	Coaches
Sophie Argus; Shayni Nelson; Elly Buckley; Airlie Ogilvie; Jemma Buckley; Caitlin Pascov; Kate Denning; Kathryn Slattery; Jess Esslemont; Penny Squibb; Kyra Flynn; Katy Symons; Preah Hetherington; Jayde Taylor; Heather Langham; Ashlee Wells; Ashleigh Nelson; Georgia Wilson	Head coach: Jason Butcher; Assistant coach: Andrew Just; Manager: Susan Dickson; Physiotherapist: Dorianne Sherry; Video Analyst: Lawrie Tyler

== 2015 WA Diamonds hockey team ==
2015 WA Diamonds hockey team
Players	Coaches
Rachel Barclay; Kyra Flynn; Holly White; Jemma Buckley; Kate Denning; Kim Lammers; Penny Squibb; Kathryn Slattery; Preah Hetherington; Georgia Wilson; Ashlee Wells (Goalkeeper); Teagan Gmeiner; Jess Esslemont; Ashleigh Nelson (Captain); Alessia Robinson; Erin Flynn; Lauren Turner; Aleisha Power (Goalkeeper)	Head coach: Suzanne Teverios; Assistant coach: Sue Dickson

== Earlier squad ==
WA Diamonds hockey team
Players	Coaches
Alessia Robinson; Ashleigh Nelson; Ashlyn Ahrens; Caitlin Pascov; Claire Ellis; Courtney Pickford; Chantelle Ciallella; Courtney Robinson; Fiona Boyce; Harriet Collins; Heather Langham; Holly White; Hope Munro; Jane Clarkson; Jayde Taylor; Jemma Buckley; Jodie Searle; Karla Barrett; Kate Denning; Kate Hubble; Kate Mead; Kate Siddell; Katelyn Rapp; Katelyn Smith; Kathryn Slattery; Kate Symons; Kersten Smith; Kobie McGurk; Kyra Flynn; Lisa Eglington; Penny Squibb; Roberta Walton; Sian Nelson; Shayni Nelson; Shelly Liddelow; Sophie Turner	Head coach: Russell Lee; Assistant coach: Tate Napier; Consultant coach: Grant Mitton; Manager: Susan Clark; Physiotherapist: Rowena Kendall
