= New South Wales Arrows =

Australian field hockey club

NSW Arrows
| Nickname | Arrows |
| Association | Hockey Australia; AHL |
| Coach | Katrina Powell |
| Assistant Coach | Pam Goodwin |
| Home Ground | Sydney Olympic Park Hockey Centre |
| Colours | Sky Blue |
Home colours / Away colours

The New South Wales Arrows were a nationally competing field hockey team based in Sydney, Australia.

Their most recent Australian Hockey League title win was in 2014. In 2015, NSW beat the ACT in the bronze medal playoff, securing 3rd place in the final rankings after beating Canberra Labor Club Strikers 3-1. The NSW Arrows were the most successful team in the AHL, winning a record 9 titles in the years 1993, 1996, 1998-2002, 2009 and 2014. After the AHL ceased operations in 2018, the Arrows were replaced with the NSW Pride in Hockey One.

== See also ==
- Sports in Australia
- Field hockey
