= Canberra Labor Club Strikers =

Australian field hockey team

Canberra Strikers
- City: Canberra, ACT
- League: Australian Hockey League
- Founded: 1993
- Home arena: National Hockey Centre
- Colours: Blue, Yellow
- Head coach: Mark Stafford
- Captain: Shelley Watson

The Canberra Labor Club Strikers are a nationally competing women's field hockey team based in Australian Capital Territory. Coached by Mark Stafford, they compete in the Australian Hockey League. They are captained by Shelley Watson and Meredith Bone. They have not won the AHL title to date, but have been runners-up on 4 occasions.

2015 Canberra Strikers hockey team
Players	Coaching staff
Catriona Bailey-Price; Edwina Bone; Kalindi Commerford; Jessica Smith; Meredith Bone (Co-Captain); Laura Gray; Shelley Watson (Co-Captain); Sophie Rodda; Erin Goad; Samantha Economos; Naomi Evans; Grace O'Hanlon (Goalkeeper); Jenny Storey; Anna Flanagan; Millie Monfries; Tina Taseska; Hayleigh Bombinski (Goalkeeper); Rachel Brady	Head coach: Mark Stafford; Asst coach: Kim Economos

Canberra Strikers hockey team
Players	Coaching staff
Catriona Bailey-Price; Edwina Bone; Ashling Williams; Jenna Cartwright; Samantha Ellis; Meredith Bone; Christie Underwood; Shelley Watson; Karina Lucas; Natalie Pastro; Jennifer Day; Alana McQueen; Naomi Evans; Clare Hanrahan; Danielle Lyons; Courtney McGowan; Nicole Arrold; Anna Flanagan; Kate Gilmore; Stacey Michelsen; Peta Sutherland; Sophie Lewis; Katie Glynn	Head coach: Ian Rutledge; Asst coach: Seyi Onitiri; Manager: Margo Davies; Physio: Phill Patton; Video Analyst: Ben Harvey
