= Australia women's national field hockey team results (2006–2010) =

The following article comprises the results of the Hockeyroos, the women's national field hockey team from Australia, from 2006 until 2010. New fixtures can be found on the International Hockey Federation's results portal.

== Match results ==
=== 2006 results ===
2006 Statistics
Team	Pld	W	D	L	GF	GA	GD	Pts
Australia	42	26	9	7	109	35	+74	87

==== Argentina test series ====
20 January 2006 Test match	Argentina	0–0	Australia	Córdoba, Argentina
		Report

21 January 2006 Test match	Argentina	0–3	Australia	Córdoba, Argentina
		Report	Skirving 5'; Faulkner 18'; Arrold 32'

==== Four Nations (Córdoba) ====
24 January 2006 Match 1	Argentina	1–0	Australia	Córdoba, Argentina
	García 39'	Report

25 January 2006 Match 2	Australia	1–1	Netherlands	Córdoba, Argentina
	Faulkner 56'	Report	Lammers 1'

27 January 2006 Match 3	Australia	2–2	England	Córdoba, Argentina
	Taylor 19'; Blyth 34'	Report	K. Walsh 14'; Danson 51'

28 January 2006 Third place match	England	0–0 (3–4 p)	Australia	Córdoba, Argentina
		Report

==== Canada test series ====
22 February 2006 Test match	Australia	2–1	Canada	Perth, Australia
	Faulkner 12'; Skirving 24'	Report	Rushton 17'	Stadium: Perth Hockey Stadium

24 February 2006 Test match	Australia	3–0	Canada	Perth, Australia
	Faulkner 37'; Skirving 58'; K. Smith 65'	Report		Stadium: Perth Hockey Stadium

26 February 2006 Test match	Australia	9–2	Canada	Perth, Australia
	Arrold 13', 35'; Alcorn 18', 32'; Faulkner 30', 47', 61'; Hollywood 62'; Walker 66'	Report	Jameson 25'; Cuthbert 51'	Stadium: Perth Hockey Stadium

==== XVIII Commonwealth Games ====
16 March 2006 Group stage	Australia	4–2	India	Melbourne, Australia
18:00	Beattie 1'; Smith 23'; Sanders 41'; Skirving 70'	Report	Lakra 13'; Kharb 22'	Stadium: State Netball and Hockey Centre

17 March 2006 Group stage	Australia	8–0	Malaysia	Melbourne, Australia
21:00	Sanders 9', 49'; Arrold 23'; Hollywood 25'; Hudson 28'; Faulkner 49'; Blyth 57'; Skirving 65'	Report		Stadium: State Netball and Hockey Centre

19 March 2006 Group stage	Nigeria	0–12	Australia	Melbourne, Australia
11:00		Report	Blyth 1'; Skirving 7'; Arrold 16', 19'; Hudson 30', 35', 53'; Halliday 32'; Beattie 39'; Taylor 51'; Smith 58'; Hollywood 62'	Stadium: State Netball and Hockey Centre

21 March 2006 Group stage	Australia	3–0	South Africa	Melbourne, Australia
13:30	Faulkner 22'; Skirving 41'; Arrold 58'	Report		Stadium: State Netball and Hockey Centre

23 March 2006 Semi-finals	Australia	3–0	England	Melbourne, Australia
11:00	Hollywood 28'; Halliday 37'; Faulkner 69'	Report		Stadium: State Netball and Hockey Centre

25 March 2006 Gold Medal Match	Australia	1–0	India	Melbourne, Australia
13:00	Hudson 62'	Report		Stadium: State Netball and Hockey Centre

==== Europe test matches ====
29 June 2006 Test match	England	2–1	Australia	Reading, United Kingdom
	Cullen 21', 68'	Report	Patrick 46'	Stadium: Reading Hockey Club

1 July 2006 Test match	Australia	5–1	Argentina	Marlow, United Kingdom
	Gallagher 10'; Hudson 12', 39'; Blyth 13'; Halliday 44'	Report	Gulla 7'	Stadium: Bisham Abbey

2 July 2006 Test match	England	1–3	Australia	Reading, United Kingdom
	Clewlow 35'	Report	Skirving 17'; Faulkner 25'; Patrick 31'	Stadium: Reading Hockey Club

6 July 2006 Test match	Germany	1–2	Australia	Amsterdam, Netherlands
	8'	Report	Taylor 33'; Hollywood 34'	Stadium: Wagener Stadium

==== XIV FIH Champions Trophy ====
8 July 2006 Group stage	Netherlands	0–0	Australia	Amsterdam, Netherlands
15:30		Report		Stadium: Wagener Stadium

9 July 2006 Group stage	Australia	0–0	New Zealand	Amsterdam, Netherlands
16:00		Report		Stadium: Wagener Stadium

11 July 2006 Group stage	China	2–1	Australia	Amsterdam, Netherlands
14:00	Ma 3'; Fu 8'	Report	Halliday 16'	Stadium: Wagener Stadium

13 July 2006 Group stage	Australia	2–3	Argentina	Amsterdam, Netherlands
16:30	Smith 8'; Hudson 44'	Report	García 42'; Hernández 50'; Aymar 70'	Stadium: Wagener Stadium

15 July 2006 Group stage	Germany	1–2	Australia	Amsterdam, Netherlands
12:00	Ernsting-Krienke 63'	Report	Smith 23'; Blyth 62'	Stadium: Wagener Stadium

16 July 2006 Fifth place match	Australia	2–1	New Zealand	Amsterdam, Netherlands
10:00	Patrick 50', 61'	Report	Dillon 67'	Stadium: Wagener Stadium

==== Four Nations (Baltimore + Virginia Beach) ====
17 August 2006 Match 1	Australia	1–2	Argentina	Baltimore, United States
	Blyth 18'	Report	Gulla 12'; Aymar 58'

19 August 2006 Match 2	United States	1–1	Australia	Baltimore, United States
	Loy 15'	Report	Smith 18'

20 August 2006 Match 3	Netherlands	2–1	Australia	Baltimore, United States
	Karres 13'; Booij 33'	Report	Patrick 68'

23 August 2006 Match 4	Australia	3–1	United States	Virginia Beach, United States
	Faulkner 1'; Munro 31'; Phipps 63'	Report	Leonetti 49'	Stadium: Virginia Beach Sportsplex

24 August 2006 Match 5	Australia	3–0	Netherlands	Virginia Beach, United States
	Messent 5'; Blyth 29'; Faulkner 57'	Report		Stadium: Virginia Beach Sportsplex

26 August 2006 Match 6	Argentina	1–1	Australia	Virginia Beach, United States
	Gulla 35'	Report	Faulkner 15'	Stadium: Virginia Beach Sportsplex

27 August 2006 Third place match	Australia	4–2	United States	Virginia Beach, United States
	Smith 12'; Patrick 33'; Hudson 36'; Munro 57'	Report	Smith 45'; Doton 51'	Stadium: Virginia Beach Sportsplex

==== South Africa test series ====
17 September 2006 Test match	Australia	7–1	South Africa	Barcelona, Spain
	Twitt 12'; Faulkner 15', 55', 61'; Hudson 38'; Beattie 51'; Taylor 59'	Report	Du Buisson 29'

19 September 2006 Test match	South Africa	1–3	Australia	Barcelona, Spain
	Du Buisson 40'	Report	Faulkner 20', 37'; Sanders 32'

20 September 2006 Test match	Australia	3–1	South Africa	Barcelona, Spain
	Taylor 9'; Munro 58'; Faulkner 67'	Report	Wilson 36'

==== XI FIH World Cup ====
27 September 2006 Group stage	Australia	1–0	South Africa	Madrid, Spain
14:00	Blyth 34'	Report		Stadium: Club de Campo Villa de Madrid

28 September 2006 Group stage	Australia	3–1	United States	Madrid, Spain
16:00	Taylor 8'; Hudson 34'; Skirving 57'	Report	Doton 11'	Stadium: Club de Campo Villa de Madrid

30 September 2006 Group stage	South Korea	3–4	Australia	Madrid, Spain
14:00	Kim Ju. 6'; Choi 35'; Park M. 63'	Report	Munro 17', 34'; Hudson 18'; Smith 23'	Stadium: Club de Campo Villa de Madrid

2 October 2006 Group stage	Japan	0–0	Australia	Madrid, Spain
14:00		Report		Stadium: Club de Campo Villa de Madrid

4 October 2006 Group stage	Australia	3–0	Argentina	Madrid, Spain
18:00	Beattie 10', 28'; Taylor 52'	Report		Stadium: Club de Campo Villa de Madrid

6 October 2006 Semi-finals	Australia	1–0 (a.e.t.)	Spain	Madrid, Spain
19:00	Faulkner 72'	Report		Stadium: Club de Campo Villa de Madrid

8 October 2006 Gold Medal Match	Netherlands	3–1	Australia	Madrid, Spain
17:00	Paumen 41', 67'; Karres 55'	Report	Sanders 47'	Stadium: Club de Campo Villa de Madrid

=== 2007 results ===
2007 Statistics
Team	Pld	W	D	L	GF	GA	GD	Pts
Australia	34	25	3	6	100	26	+74	78

==== XV FIH Champions Trophy ====
13 January 2007 Group stage	Japan	0–3	Australia	Quilmes, Argentina
17:15		Report	Trost 4'; Korner 47'; Gallagher 65'	Stadium: Estadio Nacional de Hockey

14 January 2007 Group stage	Australia	2–1	Germany	Quilmes, Argentina
18:15	Blyth 39'; Sanders 65'	Report	Schütze 35'	Stadium: Estadio Nacional de Hockey

16 January 2007 Group stage	Spain	2–2	Australia	Quilmes, Argentina
16:00	Ybarra 30'; Sánchez 47'	Report	Gallagher 10', 18'	Stadium: Estadio Nacional de Hockey

18 January 2007 Group stage	Australia	0–1	Netherlands	Quilmes, Argentina
18:15		Report	De Goede 18'	Stadium: Estadio Nacional de Hockey

20 January 2007 Group stage	Argentina	3–0	Australia	Quilmes, Argentina
17:45	Barrionuevo 34'; Maloberti 42'; Bouza 62'	Report		Stadium: Estadio Nacional de Hockey

21 January 2007 Bronze Medal Match	Australia	0–2	Germany	Quilmes, Argentina
18:30		Report	Beermann 9'; Lorenzen 51'	Stadium: Estadio Nacional de Hockey

==== New Zealand test series ====
13 May 2007 Test match	New Zealand	1–0	Australia	Christchurch, New Zealand
	Saunders 26'	Report

15 May 2007 Test match	New Zealand	0–3	Australia	Christchurch, New Zealand
		Report	Blyth 16', 25'; Rivers 37'

19 May 2007 Test match	New Zealand	0–1	Australia	Dunedin, New Zealand
		Report	Trost 31'

20 May 2007 Test match	New Zealand	2–4	Australia	Oamaru, New Zealand
	Dillon 26'; Harrison 41'	Report	Munro 11', 58'; Halliday 42'; Liddelow 48'

==== Japan test series ====
12 July 2007 Test match	Australia	1–0	Japan	Melbourne, Australia
	Lambert 64'	Report		Stadium: State Netball and Hockey Centre

14 July 2007 Test match	Australia	3–1	Japan	Melbourne, Australia
	Attard 57'; Rivers 62'; Lambert 67'	Report	Tsuki 9'	Stadium: State Netball and Hockey Centre

15 July 2007 Test match	Australia	3–3	Japan	Adelaide, Australia
	Hudson 7'; Rivers 9'; Halliday 25'	Report	Nakagawa 13'; Miura 26'; Morimoto 63'	Stadium: State Hockey Centre

18 July 2007 Test match	Australia	1–0	Japan	Adelaide, Australia
	Attard 44'	Report		Stadium: State Hockey Centre

20 July 2007 Test match	Australia	5–1	Japan	Port Lincoln, Australia
	Sanders 8', 17', 43', 49'; Hollywood 60'	Report	Morimoto 52'	Stadium: Port Lincoln Hockey Association

22 July 2007 Test match	Australia	1–0	Japan	Port Lincoln, Australia
	Blyth 61'	Report		Stadium: Port Lincoln Hockey Association

==== China test series ====
2 August 2007 Test match	China	2–3	Australia	Beijing, China
	10', 48'	Report	Taylor 15'; Munro 54', 61'	Stadium: Olympic Green Hockey Field

4 August 2007 Test match	China	2–3	Australia	Beijing, China
	19', 57'	Report	Blyth 27'; Rivers 55'; Hollywood 64'	Stadium: Olympic Green Hockey Field

5 August 2007 Test match	China	0–2	Australia	Beijing, China
		Report	Taylor 46'; Munro 69'	Stadium: Olympic Green Hockey Field

==== Good Luck Beijing ====
8 August 2007 Group stage	Australia	4–0	South Africa	Beijing, China
	Sanders 16'; Rivers 28'; Hollywood 31'; Hudson 43'	Report		Stadium: Olympic Green Hockey Field

9 August 2007 Group stage	Australia	2–0	Argentina	Beijing, China
	Hudson 32'; Rivers 57'	Report		Stadium: Olympic Green Hockey Field

11 August 2007 Group stage	China	0–3	Australia	Beijing, China
		Report	Munro 8'; Hudson 54'; Sanders 57'	Stadium: Olympic Green Hockey Field

13 August 2007 Final	Australia	2–2 (3–1 p)	China	Beijing, China
	Blyth 18'; Munro 59'	Report	Chen 28'; Song 57'	Stadium: Olympic Green Hockey Field

==== Oceania Cup ====
11 September 2007 Group stage	Australia	14–0	Fiji	Buderim, Australia
16:30	Sanders 7', 48'; Blyth 8', 30', 38', 58'; Munro 18', 49'; Eastham 22'; Rivers 29'; Hudson 44', 52'; Lambert 68', 70'	Report

12 September 2007 Group stage	Australia	1–0	New Zealand	Buderim, Australia
18:30	Blyth 63'	Report

14 September 2007 Group stage	Papua New Guinea	0–17	Australia	Buderim, Australia
18:30		Report	Halliday 2'; Attard 5', 22', 34'; Lambert 12', 52'; Hudson 13', 69'; Taylor 18', 63', 70'; Eastham 21'; Hollywood 32', 39'; Arrold 41'; Rivers 47', 60'

16 September 2007 Final	Australia	0–1	New Zealand	Buderim, Australia
10:00		Report	Forgesson 54'

==== South Africa test series ====
17 October 2007 Test match	South Africa	2–1	Australia	Randburg, South Africa
19:00	Hosking 22'; Bailey 63'	Report	Halliday 6'

19 October 2007 Test match	South Africa	0–1	Australia	Pretoria, South Africa
19:00		Report	Munro 24'

20 October 2007 Test match	South Africa	0–1	Australia	Randburg, South Africa
15:30		Report	Hollywood 15'

==== Ireland test series ====
24 October 2007 Test match	Ireland	0–3	Australia	Dublin, Ireland
		Report	Liddelow 9', 31'; Sanders 11'	Stadium: University College Dublin

25 October 2007 Test match	Ireland	0–6	Australia	Dublin, Ireland
		Report	Hollywood 11', 32', 62'; Eastham 39'; Munro 49'; Halliday 60'	Stadium: University College Dublin

27 October 2007 Test match	Ireland	0–5	Australia	Dublin, Ireland
		Report	Hollywood 4'; Munro 22'; Blyth 27'; Eastham 35'; Rivers 70'	Stadium: University College Dublin

28 October 2007 Test match	Ireland	0–3	Australia	Dublin, Ireland
		Report	Halliday 20'; Rivers 61'; Munro 62'	Stadium: University College Dublin

=== 2008 results ===
2008 Statistics
Team	Pld	W	D	L	GF	GA	GD	Pts
Australia	21	13	2	6	54	30	+24	41

==== Great Britain test series ====
14 February 2008 Test match	Australia	5–0	Great Britain	Perth, Australia
	Eastham 5', 40'; Lambert 40'; Blyth 45'; Rivers 63'	Report		Stadium: Perth Hockey Stadium

16 February 2008 Test match	Australia	2–1	Great Britain	Perth, Australia
	Munro 64', 67'	Report	Ellis 40'	Stadium: Perth Hockey Stadium

21 February 2008 Test match	Australia	2–0	Great Britain	Brisbane, Australia
	Attard 16'; Munro 44'	Report		Stadium: Queensland State Hockey Centre

23 February 2008 Test match	Australia	5–2	Great Britain	Toowoomba, Australia
	Lambert 8', 54'; Blyth 26'; Faulkner 32'; Young 49'	Report	Richardson 35'; Walsh 39'	Stadium: Toowoomba Hockey Association

24 February 2008 Test match	Australia	1–0	Great Britain	Gold Coast, Australia
	Rivers 25'	Report		Stadium: Keith Hunt Park

==== XVI FIH Champions Trophy ====
17 May 2008 Group stage	Australia	2–0	Japan	Mönchengladbach, Germany
13:05	Eastham 18'; Halliday 61'	Report		Stadium: Warsteiner HockeyPark

18 May 2008 Group stage	Germany	2–1	Australia	Mönchengladbach, Germany
14:05	Kühn 7'; Böhmert 18'	Report	Rivers 65'	Stadium: Warsteiner HockeyPark

20 May 2008 Group stage	Australia	1–2	Argentina	Mönchengladbach, Germany
18:05	Rivers 42'	Report	Barrionuevo 27'; Luchetti 53'	Stadium: Warsteiner HockeyPark

21 May 2008 Group stage	China	3–3	Australia	Mönchengladbach, Germany
16:05	Ma Yibo 17'; Fu Baorong 48'; Zhao Yudiao 62'	Report	Young 4'; Rivers 16'; McGurk 70'	Stadium: Warsteiner HockeyPark

24 May 2008 Group stage	Australia	1–2	Netherlands	Mönchengladbach, Germany
16:05	Rivers 52'	Report	Agliotti 27'; Mulder 37'	Stadium: Warsteiner HockeyPark

25 May 2008 Fifth place match	Australia	3–0	Japan	Mönchengladbach, Germany
10:05	Young 28'; Rivers 56'; Hudson 61'	Report		Stadium: Warsteiner HockeyPark

==== Japan test series ====
2 July 2008 Test match	Japan	4–2	Australia	Tenri, Japan
	Ono 8'; Kozakura 20'; Morimoto 41'; Komori 59'	Report	Young 13'; Eastham 69'

4 July 2008 Test match	Japan	1–2	Australia	Tenri, Japan
	Miura 8'	Report	Hudson 43'; Walker 50'

6 July 2008 Test match	Japan	3–1	Australia	Tenri, Japan
	Komazawa 20'; Morimoto 42'; Chiba 45'	Report	Eastham 65'

8 July 2008 Test match	Japan	1–4	Australia	Tenri, Japan
	Komazawa 55'	Report	Hudson 2', 67'; Rivers 10'; Halliday 40'

==== XXIX Olympic Games ====
10 August 2008 Group stage	Australia	5–4	South Korea	Beijing, China
18:00	Liddelow 25', 50'; Hudson 47'; Young 56'; Eastham 65'	Report	Kim M. 18'; Kim D. 27'; Gim 32'; Park M. 34'	Stadium: Olympic Green Hockey Field

12 August 2008 Group stage	Australia	6–1	Spain	Beijing, China
10:30	Lambert 27', 60'; Hudson 47'; Eastham 54'; Halliday 66'; Rivers 6'	Report	Muñoz 18'	Stadium: Olympic Green Hockey Field

14 August 2008 Group stage	South Africa	0–3	Australia	Beijing, China
20:30		Report	Hudson 10'; Lambert 44'; Eastham 62'	Stadium: Olympic Green Hockey Field

16 August 2008 Group stage	Australia	1–2	Netherlands	Beijing, China
10:30	Young 17'	Report	Paumen 20', 46'	Stadium: Olympic Green Hockey Field

18 August 2008 Group stage	China	2–2	Australia	Beijing, China
21:00	Li H. 30', 38'	Report	Eastham 51'; Young 62'	Stadium: Olympic Green Hockey Field

22 August 2008 Fifth place match	Australia	2–0	Great Britain	Beijing, China
11:00	Blyth 29'; Munro 68'	Report		Stadium: Olympic Green Hockey Field

=== 2009 results ===
2009 statistics
Team	Pld	W	D	L	GF	GA	GD	Pts
Australia	28	19	6	3	69	21	+48	63

==== South Africa test series ====
28 May 2009 Test match	South Africa	0–4	Australia	Durban, South Africa
		Report	Munro 20'; Arrold 28'; Nanscawen 57'; McGurk 61'	Stadium: Queensmead Hockey Stadium

30 May 2009 Test match	South Africa	0–5	Australia	Durban, South Africa
		Report	Hurtz 5'; Munro 29'; Hollywood 31'; Blyth 46'; Schubach 63'	Stadium: Queensmead Hockey Stadium

==== India test match ====
31 May 2009 Test match	Australia	7–0	India	Durban, South Africa
	Eastham 8'; Blyth 14'; Hurtz 28', 67'; Arrold 51'; Rivers 60'; Schubach 67'	Report		Stadium: Queensmead Hockey Stadium

==== SPAR Cup ====
2 June 2009 Group stage	Australia	3–1	India	Durban, South Africa
14:00	Hurtz 15'; Eastham 51'; McGurk 65'	Report	Thokchom 49'	Stadium: Queensmead Hockey Stadium

3 June 2009 Group stage	Argentina	2–2	Australia	Durban, South Africa
14:00	D. Sruoga 20'; Rebecchi 25'	Report	Eastham 2'; Hollywood 12'	Stadium: Queensmead Hockey Stadium

5 June 2009 Group stage	Australia	1–0	South Africa	Durban, South Africa
16:00	Hollywood 64'	Report		Stadium: Queensmead Hockey Stadium

6 June 2009 Final	Argentina	1–3	Australia	Durban, South Africa
15:30	D'Elía 31'	Report	Eastham 38'; Hurtz 54'; Hollywood 64'	Stadium: Queensmead Hockey Stadium

==== Germany test series ====
4 July 2009 Test match	Australia	2–0	Germany	Perth, Australia
	Arrold 28'; Nanscawen 55'	Report		Stadium: Perth Hockey Stadium

6 July 2009 Test match	Australia	2–2	Germany	Perth, Australia
	Rivers 1'; Blyth 44'	Report	Rinne 5'; Kühn 61'	Stadium: Perth Hockey Stadium

==== XVII FIH Champions Trophy ====
11 July 2009 Group stage	Germany	0–2	Australia	Sydney, Australia
13:05		Report	Hurtz 36'; Blyth 43'	Stadium: Sydney Olympic Park

12 July 2009 Group stage	Australia	0–1	Argentina	Sydney, Australia
13:05		Report	J. Sruoga 35'	Stadium: Sydney Olympic Park

14 July 2009 Group stage	Australia	2–2	China	Sydney, Australia
20:05	Nelson 45'; Eastham 57'	Report	Song 50'; Liao 65'	Stadium: Sydney Olympic Park

16 July 2009 Group stage	England	0–4	Australia	Sydney, Australia
20:05		Report	Arrold 13', 38'; Eastham 25'; Munro 55'	Stadium: Sydney Olympic Park

18 July 2009 Group stage	Australia	2–1	Netherlands	Sydney, Australia
13:05	Eastham 2'; Arrold 43'	Report	Paumen 9'	Stadium: Sydney Olympic Park

19 July 2009 Gold Medal Match	Argentina	0–0 (4–3 p)	Australia	Sydney, Australia
15:05		Report		Stadium: Sydney Olympic Park
	Penalties
	Barrionuevo (penalty shoot-out scored); Burkart (penalty shoot-out missed); Rebecchi (penalty shoot-out scored); D'Elia (penalty shoot-out scored); Aymar (penalty shoot-out scored)		(penalty shoot-out missed) Arrold; (penalty shoot-out scored) Eastham; (penalty shoot-out scored) Blyth; (penalty shoot-out scored) Hurtz; (penalty shoot-out missed) Boyce

==== Oceania Cup ====
25 August 2009 Group stage	Australia	16–0	Samoa	Invercargill, New Zealand
15:15	Hollywood 1', 47'; Arrold 9', 12'; Messent 10', 14', 25'; Nelson 19', 21', 30', 32', 52'; Blyth 21', 69'; Munro 26'; Eastham 65'	Report		Stadium: Hockey Southland

26 August 2009 Group stage	New Zealand	1–2	Australia	Invercargill, New Zealand
13:15	C. Harrison 14'	Report	Nelson 2', 4'	Stadium: Hockey Southland

29 August 2009 Gold Medal Match	Australia	2–2 (3–4 p)	New Zealand	Invercargill, New Zealand
13:15	Eastham 21'; Rivers 46'	Report	Eshuis 48'; Sharland 57'	Stadium: Hockey Southland

==== Spain test series ====
1 October 2009 Test match	Spain	0–1	Australia	Terrassa, Spain
		Report	Johnson 24'

2 October 2009 Test match	Spain	0–2	Australia	Terrassa, Spain
		Report	Nelson 1', 8'

4 October 2009 Test match	Spain	2–2	Australia	Terrassa, Spain
	12', 61'	Report	Nelson 12'; Attard 55'

==== Argentina test series ====
10 October 2009 Test match	Argentina	0–1	Australia	Mendoza, Argentina
		Report	Blyth 41'

11 October 2009 Test match	Argentina	2–3	Australia	Mendoza, Argentina
	Barrionuevo 38'; Luchetti 42'	Report	Hollywood 53'; Blyth 60'; Nelson 63'

12 October 2009 Test match	Argentina	0–1	Australia	Mendoza, Argentina
		Report	Nelson 41'

14 October 2009 Test match	Argentina	2–0	Australia	Mendoza, Argentina
	D. Sruoga 1'; Barrionuevo 46'	Report

16 October 2009 Test match	Argentina	2–0	Australia	Mendoza, Argentina
	Aymar 27', 41'	Report

=== 2010 results ===
2010 Statistics
Team	Pld	W	D	L	GF	GA	GD	Pts
Australia	37	25	5	7	109	47	+62	80

==== New Zealand test series ====
14 February 2010 Test match	Australia	3–2	New Zealand	Perth, Australia
	Blyth 19'; Johnson 50'; Arrold 55'	Report	Flynn 5', 9'

16 February 2010 Test match	Australia	2–0	New Zealand	Perth, Australia
	Korner 8'; Munro 17'	Report

17 February 2010 Test match	Australia	4–1	New Zealand	Perth, Australia
	Munro 8'; Korner 30'; Arrold 51'; Evans 61'	Report	Forgesson 13'

==== Korea test series ====
2 March 2010 Test match	Australia	5–3	South Korea	Perth, Australia
	Arrold 3', 69'; Liddelow 14', 43'; Blyth 26'	Report	Lee Soo-kyoung 4', 63'; Kim Jong-eun 41'

3 March 2010 Test match	Australia	0–1	South Korea	Perth, Australia
		Report	Lee Soo-kyoung 19'

5 March 2010 Test match	Australia	2–3	South Korea	Perth, Australia
	Hurtz 17'; Korner 37'	Report	Park Mi-hyun 29'; Lee Soo-kyoung 43', 49'

==== Argentina test series ====
24 March 2010 Test match	Australia	1–2	Argentina	Townsville, Australia
	Blyth 18'	Report	Abente 23'; Barrionuevo 54'

25 March 2010 Test match	Australia	1–2	Argentina	Townsville, Australia
	Arrold 64'	Report	Barrionuevo 8', 9'

27 March 2010 Test match	Australia	0–0	Argentina	Townsville, Australia
		Report

28 March 2010 Test match	Australia	2–1	Argentina	Townsville, Australia
	Arrold 39'; Hollywood 63'	Report	Maccari 13'

==== Chile test match ====
19 April 2010 Test match	Chile	0–4	Australia	Santiago, Chile
		Report	Arrold; Messent; Korner; McGurk

==== FIH World Cup Qualifiers ====
24 April 2010 Group stage	Chile	0–5	Australia	Santiago, Chile
15:30		Report	Korner 15'; Nelson 24', 43'; Blyth 51'; Hollywood 55'

29 April 2010 Group stage	Australia	9–0	Malaysia	Santiago, Chile
14:00	Nelson 4', 40', 56'; Blyth 25', 31', 67'; Hollywood 35'; Arrold 44'; Eastham 64'	Report

30 April 2010 Group stage	Scotland	1–2	Australia	Santiago, Chile
12:00	Cram 60'	Report	Eastham 24'; Blyth 35'

2 May 2010 Group stage	Australia	4–1	Ireland	Santiago, Chile
10:00	Munro 8', 16'; Arrold 47'; Liddelow 58'	Report	Speers 19'

==== Great Britain test series ====
16 June 2010 Test match	Great Britain	0–4	Australia	Bisham, United Kingdom
		Report	Nelson 31'; Korner 34'; Arrold 39'; Boyce 64'

18 June 2010 Test match	Great Britain	1–1	Australia	Bisham, United Kingdom
	Goal	Report	Blyth 21'

==== Germany test series ====
22 June 2010 Test match	Germany	6–2	Australia	Essen, Germany
	15', 19', 26', 34', 49', 67'	Report	Arrold 2'; Rivers 14'

23 June 2010 Test match	Germany	2–4	Australia	Essen, Germany
	18', 62'	Report	Nelson 24', 38'; Blyth 47'; Korner 65'

==== Four Nations (Essen) ====
25 June 2010 Group stage	Australia	4–0	Ireland	Essen, Germany
	Arrold 27', 56', 64'; Nelson 31'	Report

26 June 2010 Group stage	Australia	6–2	India	Essen, Germany
	Arrold 7'; Rivers 20', 22', 37', 31'; Blyth 49'	Report	17', 45'

27 June 2010 Group stage	Germany	1–1	Australia	Essen, Germany
	Otte 42'	Report	Nelson 70'

==== Ireland test series ====
30 June 2010 Test match	Ireland	0–1	Australia	Dublin, Ireland
		Report	Hurtz 37'

2 July 2010 Test match	Ireland	0–1	Australia	Dublin, Ireland
		Report	Hurtz 67'

3 July 2010 Test match	Ireland	1–4	Australia	Dublin, Ireland
		Report	Hurtz 18', 32', 45'; Rivers 52'

==== XII FIH World Cup ====
30 August 2010 Group stage	Australia	2–1	Japan	Rosario, Argentina
19:30	McGurk 14'; Blyth 61'	Report	Chiba 63'	Stadium: Estadio Mundialista de Hockey

1 September 2010 Group stage	India	3–6	Australia	Rosario, Argentina
14:30	Rani R. 30', 62'; Ritu 42'	Report	Blyth 17'; Nelson 34', 58'; Eastham 52'; Arrold 55'; Liddelow 64'	Stadium: Estadio Mundialista de Hockey

3 September 2010 Group stage	Australia	1–4	Netherlands	Rosario, Argentina
19:00	Arrold 21'	Report	Paumen 10', 34', 40'; Smeets 46'	Stadium: Estadio Mundialista de Hockey

5 September 2010 Group stage	New Zealand	1–4	Australia	Rosario, Argentina
19:30	Forgesson 5'	Report	McGurk 12'; Nelson 57', 65'; Liddelow 63'	Stadium: Estadio Mundialista de Hockey

7 September 2010 Group stage	Australia	0–1	Germany	Rosario, Argentina
19:30		Report	Bachmann	Stadium: Estadio Mundialista de Hockey

10 September 2010 Fifth place match	Australia	2–1	South Korea	Rosario, Argentina
19:30	Eastham 33'; Arrold 68'	Report	Kim Y. 22'	Stadium: Estadio Mundialista de Hockey

==== XIX Commonwealth Games ====
5 October 2010 Group stage	Australia	11–0	Trinidad and Tobago	New Delhi, India
13:00	Eastham 14'; Hurtz 19', 48', 63'; Blyth 27'; Liddelow 30'; Arrold 37'; Rivers 41', 46'; Taylor 50'; Nelson 60'	Report		Stadium: Major Dhyan Chand National Stadium

6 October 2010 Group stage	Australia	2–1	India	New Delhi, India
13:30	Liddelow 11'; Rivers 59'	Report	Rani R. 69'	Stadium: Major Dhyan Chand National Stadium

8 October 2010 Group stage	South Africa	1–1	Australia	New Delhi, India
08:30	Damons 31'	Report	Hurtz 8'	Stadium: Major Dhyan Chand National Stadium

9 October 2010 Group stage	Australia	5–2	Scotland	New Delhi, India
13:30	Hollywood 3'; Rivers 12'; Arrold 30', 56'; Nelson 43'	Report	Judge 50'; Robertson 54'	Stadium: Major Dhyan Chand National Stadium

11 October 2010 Semi-finals	Australia	1–0	England	New Delhi, India
11:00	Blyth 38'	Report		Stadium: Major Dhyan Chand National Stadium

13 October 2010 Gold Medal Match	Australia	2–2 (4–2 p)	New Zealand	New Delhi, India
13:00	Arrold 9'; Nelson 59'	Report	S. Harrison 48'; Eshuis 70'	Stadium: Major Dhyan Chand National Stadium
	Penalties
	Nelson (penalty shoot-out scored); Rivers (penalty shoot-out scored); Blyth (penalty shoot-out missed); Eastham (penalty shoot-out scored); Arrold (penalty shoot-out scored)		(penalty shoot-out missed) Glynn; (penalty shoot-out missed) Forgesson; (penalty shoot-out scored) Michelsen; (penalty shoot-out scored) Sharland
