= 2009 Women's Australian Hockey League =

Tournament details
- Host country: Australia
- City: Melbourne
- Dates: 27 February – 5 April
- Teams: 8
- Venue: State Netball and Hockey Centre

Final positions
- Champions: NSW Arrows (8th title)
- Runner-up: QLD Scorchers
- Third place: WA Diamonds

Tournament statistics
- Matches played: 52
- Goals scored: 220 (4.23 per match)
- Top scorer: Emily Hurtz (12 goals)
- Best player: Hope Munro

The 2009 Women's Australian Hockey League was the 17th edition women's field hockey tournament. The tournament was held between 27 February – 5 April 2009 at various venues, before culminating in Melbourne for the finals.

NSW Arrows won the tournament for the eighth time after defeating QLD Scorchers 5–3 in the final. WA Diamonds finished in third place after defeating Canberra Strikers 2–0 in the third and fourth place playoff.

== Participating teams ==
- Canberra Strikers
- NSW Arrows
- NT Pearls
- QLD Scorchers
- Southern Suns
- Tassie Van Demons
- VIC Vipers
- WA Diamonds

== Competition format ==
The 2008 Women's Australian Hockey League consisted of a single round robin format, followed by classification matches.

Teams from all 8 states and territories competed against one another throughout the pool stage. At the conclusion of the pool stage, the top four ranked teams progressed to the semi-finals, while the bottom four teams continued to the classification stage.

=== Point Allocation ===
All matches had an outright result, meaning drawn matches were decided in either golden goal extra time, or a penalty shoot-out. Match points were as follows:

· 3 points for a win
· 1 points to each team in the event of a draw
· 1 point will be awarded to the winner of the shoot-out
· 0 points to the loser of the match

== Results ==
=== Preliminary round ===
Pos	Team	Pld	W	WD	LD	L	GF	GA	GD	Pts	Qualification
1	NSW Arrows	11	10	1	0	0	41	7	+34	41	Semi-finals
2	WA Diamonds	11	10	0	0	1	38	12	+26	36	Semi-finals
3	QLD Scorchers	11	6	0	0	5	28	21	+7	24	Semi-finals
4	Canberra Strikers	11	5	0	0	6	16	24	−8	24	Semi-finals
5	VIC Vipers	11	6	0	1	4	27	18	+9	22	
6	Adelaide Suns	11	3	1	0	7	15	30	−15	11	
7	Tassie Van Demons	11	1	0	2	8	13	42	−29	6	
8	Territory Pearls	11	0	1	0	10	6	30	−24	4	

Source: Clearing House
Rules for classification: 1) points; 2) head-to-head result; 3) goal difference; 4) matches won; 5) goals scored.

==== Fixtures ====
27 February 2009

Canberra Strikers	2–4	VIC Vipers
E. Taylor 5'; Gallagher 6'	Report	Schubach 19'; Chau 28'; Trahar 44'; O'Connor 65'

Stadium:
National Hockey Centre, Canberra

27 February 2009

Tassie Van Demons	3–4 (a.e.t.)	Southern Suns
Duay 4'; White 8'; Geeves 44'	Report	Coleiro 24'; J. Pisani 25'; Hamahona 64', 82'

Stadium:
Tasmanian Hockey Centre, Hobart

27 February 2009

QLD Scorchers	1–4	NSW Arrows
Korner 69'	Report	Rivers 54'; Barber 61'; Hurtz 65', 67'

Stadium:
Maryborough Hockey Association, Maryborough

27 February 2009

NT Pearls	0–2	WA Diamonds
	Report	Ciallella 16'; Buckley 45'

Stadium:
Marrara Hockey Centre, Darwin

1 March 2009

Canberra Strikers	0–3	VIC Vipers
	Report	Burns 19'; Peake 25'; Nanscawen 36'

Stadium:
National Hockey Centre, Canberra

1 March 2009

Tassie Van Demons	1–0	Southern Suns
White 10'	Report

Stadium:
Tasmanian Hockey Centre, Hobart

1 March 2009

QLD Scorchers	0–3	NSW Arrows
	Report	Hurtz 20'; Barber 44', 50'

Stadium:
Maryborough Hockey Association, Maryborough

1 March 2009

NT Pearls	0–3	WA Diamonds
	Report	Eglington 49'; Collins 55', 60'

Stadium:
Marrara Hockey Centre, Darwin

6 March 2009

WA Diamonds	5–1	QLD Scorchers
Liddelow 3', 23'; Ciallella 6', 21', 67'	Report	Korner 63'

Stadium:
Perth Hockey Stadium, Perth

6 March 2009

Southern Suns	2–1	NT Pearls
Parker 8'; Simms 68'	Report	O'Connell 56'

Stadium:
State Hockey Centre, Adelaide

6 March 2009

VIC Vipers	6–1	Tassie Van Demons
Peake 16'; Riordan 17'; Schubach 32'; Messent 41', 58'; O'Connor 60'	Report	Geeves 5'

Stadium:
State Netball and Hockey Centre, Melbourne

6 March 2009

NSW Arrows	6–0	Canberra Strikers
Rivers 10'; Sanders 26', 58', 68'; Hurtz 44', 66'	Report

Stadium:
Sydney Olympic Park, Sydney

8 March 2009

WA Diamonds	3–2	QLD Scorchers
Munro 16'; Ciallella 36', 46'	Report	J. Dwyer 50', 53'

Stadium:
Perth Hockey Stadium, Perth

8 March 2009

Southern Suns	2–0	NT Pearls
Greenshields 18'; Hamahona 58'	Report

Stadium:
State Hockey Centre, Adelaide

8 March 2009

VIC Vipers	2–0	Tassie Van Demons
Trost 40'; Riordan 55'	Report

Stadium:
State Netball and Hockey Centre, Melbourne

8 March 2009

NSW Arrows	2–1	Canberra Strikers
Barber 22'; Hurtz 60'	Report	E. Taylor 20'

Stadium:
Sydney Olympic Park, Sydney

13 March 2009

Tassie Van Demons	1–6	QLD Scorchers
Bashore 55'	Report	Holcroft 4', 15'; J. Dwyer 18'; M. Hudson 44'; Korner 50'; Reuter 52'

Stadium:
Tasmanian Hockey Centre, Hobart

13 March 2009

VIC Vipers	1–2	Southern Suns
Schubach 50'	Report	Simms 14'; Hampton 54'

Stadium:
State Netball and Hockey Centre, Melbourne

13 March 2009

WA Diamonds	4–1	Canberra Strikers
Buckley 15', 17'; A. Nelson 25'; Liddelow 32'	Report	Desmet 54'

Stadium:
Perth Hockey Stadium, Perth

13 March 2009

NT Pearls	1–6	NSW Arrows
E. Peris 10'	Report	Sanders 7'; Hollywood 33'; Close 34', 46'; Barber 47'; Eastham 61'

Stadium:
Marrara Hockey Centre, Darwin

15 March 2009

Tassie Van Demons	0–3	QLD Scorchers
Bashore 55'	Report	Blyth 30', 66'; Holcroft 62'

Stadium:
Tasmanian Hockey Centre, Hobart

15 March 2009

VIC Vipers	2–1	Southern Suns
Riordan 56'; Schubach 61'	Report	Hamahona 41'

Stadium:
State Netball and Hockey Centre, Melbourne

15 March 2009

WA Diamonds	3–0	Canberra Strikers
McGurk 16'; Smithson 30'; Gale 34'	Report

Stadium:
Perth Hockey Stadium, Perth

15 March 2009

NT Pearls	0–3	NSW Arrows
	Report	Close 13'; Eastham 23'; Brooks 65'

Stadium:
Marrara Hockey Centre, Darwin

21 March 2009

NSW Arrows	3–2 (a.e.t.)	VIC Vipers
Rivers 28'; Close 35'; Harris 74'	Report	Coulson 15'; Chau 59'

Stadium:
Sydney Olympic Park, Sydney

21 March 2009

Southern Suns	2–5	WA Diamonds
Simms 60', 64'	Report	Munro 4'; Liddelow 12'; A. Nelson 23'; Eglington 36'; Buckley 49'

Stadium:
State Hockey Centre, Adelaide

21 March 2009

Canberra Strikers	4–0	Tassie Van Demons
De La Paz Hernández 8'; Lucas 17'; Desmet 25', 54'	Report

Stadium:
National Hockey Centre, Canberra

21 March 2009

QLD Scorchers	1–0	NT Pearls
Schulz 41'	Report

Stadium:
Queensland State Hockey Centre, Brisbane

22 March 2009

NSW Arrows	2–1	VIC Vipers
Hurtz 3'; Harris 33'	Report	Coulson 64'

Stadium:
Sydney Olympic Park, Sydney

22 March 2009

Southern Suns	0–5	WA Diamonds
	Report	A. Nelson 6'; Taylor 7'; Gale 22', 45'; Buckley 70'

Stadium:
State Hockey Centre, Adelaide

22 March 2009

Canberra Strikers	2–1	Tassie Van Demons
De La Paz Hernández 23'; Flanagan 43'	Report	Calvert 66'

Stadium:
National Hockey Centre, Canberra

22 March 2009

QLD Scorchers	3–0	NT Pearls
Holcroft 18'; M. Hudson 44'; Reuter 57'	Report

Stadium:
Queensland State Hockey Centre, Brisbane

30 March 2009

NT Pearls	0–3	VIC Vipers
	Report	Chau 25'; Joseph 38'; Messent 59'

Stadium:
State Netball and Hockey Centre, Melbourne

30 March 2009

QLD Scorchers	1–2	Canberra Strikers
M. Hudson 53'	Report	Desmet 10', 39'

Stadium:
State Netball and Hockey Centre, Melbourne

30 March 2009

Southern Suns	0–4	NSW Arrows
	Report	Sanders 51', 52', 59'; Close 54'

Stadium:
State Netball and Hockey Centre, Melbourne

30 March 2009

Tassie Van Demons	2–5	WA Diamonds
Bashore 9'; White 25'	Report	Collins 31', 43'; Gale 40'; Calton 56'; Ciallella 65'

Stadium:
State Netball and Hockey Centre, Melbourne

31 March 2009

Southern Suns	2–6	QLD Scorchers
Evans 5'; J. Pisani 52'	Report	Schulz 10', 60'; Eiser 19'; Korner 43', 45', 58'

Stadium:
State Netball and Hockey Centre, Melbourne

31 March 2009

NSW Arrows	6–1	Tassie Van Demons
Eastham 19', 54'; Hurtz 39'; Johnson 43'; Rivers 47'; Harris 61'	Report	White 25'

Stadium:
State Netball and Hockey Centre, Melbourne

31 March 2009

VIC Vipers	2–3	WA Diamonds
Bond 8'; Messent 58'	Report	Smithson 13', 18'; Liddelow 35'

Stadium:
State Netball and Hockey Centre, Melbourne

31 March 2009

Canberra Strikers	2–0	NT Pearls
Kelly 47', 49'	Report

Stadium:
State Netball and Hockey Centre, Melbourne

2 April 2009

WA Diamonds	0–2	NSW Arrows
	Report	Brooks 8'; Hurtz 62'

Stadium:
State Netball and Hockey Centre, Melbourne

2 April 2009

Canberra Strikers	2–0	Southern Suns
Kelly 34'; Desmet 40'	Report

Stadium:
State Netball and Hockey Centre, Melbourne

2 April 2009

NT Pearls	4–3 (a.e.t.)	Tassie Van Demons
T. Eiser 15', 35'; Chiu 16', 76'	Report	Geeves 1'; Duay 25', 68'

Stadium:
State Netball and Hockey Centre, Melbourne

2 April 2009

QLD Scorchers	4–1	VIC Vipers
Holcroft 1', 28'; Schulz 25'; Blyth 54'	Report	Messent 12'

Stadium:
State Netball and Hockey Centre, Melbourne

=== Classification round ===
==== Fifth to eighth place classification ====
Crossover
4 April 2009
VIC Vipers	6
NT Pearls	1
4 April 2009
Southern Suns	3
Tassie Van Demons	0

Fifth and Sixth place
5 April 2009
VIC Vipers	5
Southern Suns	2
Seventh and Eighth place
5 April 2009
NT Pearls (a.e.t)	3
Tassie Van Demons	2

===== Crossover =====
4 April 2009

VIC Vipers	6–1	NT Pearls
Nanscawen 5'; Messent 40'; O'Connor 48'; Riordan 51'; Trost 52', 58'	Report	Marriner 57'

Stadium:
State Netball and Hockey Centre, Melbourne

4 April 2009

Southern Suns	3–0	Tassie Van Demons
Claxton 17'; Parker 62'; Hamahona 68'	Report

Stadium:
State Netball and Hockey Centre, Melbourne

===== Seventh and eighth place =====
5 April 2009

NT Pearls	3–2 (a.e.t.)	Tassie Van Demons
Ashleigh Morrison 29'; Purdy 36'; Powely 80'	Report	Bashore 62'; Khoury 63'

Stadium:
State Netball and Hockey Centre, Melbourne

===== Fifth and sixth place =====
5 April 2009

VIC Vipers	5–2	Southern Suns
Messent 10'; Joseph 30'; Nanscawen 33'; Chau 51'; Riordan 59'	Report	Evans 49'; Hamahona 66'

Stadium:
State Netball and Hockey Centre, Melbourne

==== First to fourth place classification ====
Semi-finals
4 April 2009
NSW Arrows	2
Canberra Strikers	0
4 April 2009
WA Diamonds	1 (1)
QLD Scorchers (p.s.o)	1 (3)

Final
5 April 2009
NSW Arrows	5
QLD Scorchers	3
Third and Fourth place
5 April 2009
Canberra Strikers	0
WA Diamonds	2

===== Semi-finals =====
4 April 2009

NSW Arrows	2–0	Canberra Strikers
Harris 46'; Hurtz 63'	Report

Stadium:
State Netball and Hockey Centre, Melbourne

4 April 2009

WA Diamonds	1–1	QLD Scorchers
McGurk 68'	Report	Blyth 9'
Penalties
	1–3

Stadium:
State Netball and Hockey Centre, Melbourne

===== Third and fourth place =====
5 April 2009

Canberra Strikers	0–2	WA Diamonds
	Report	Buckley 53'; McGurk 58'

Stadium:
State Netball and Hockey Centre, Melbourne

===== Final =====
5 April 2009

NSW Arrows	5–3	QLD Scorchers
Eastham 11'; Harris 27'; Hurtz 41', 58'; Rivers 46'	Report	Schulz 12', 22', 37'

Stadium:
State Netball and Hockey Centre, Melbourne

== Awards ==
Player of the Tournament	Top Goalscorer	Player of the Final
Hope Munro	Emily Hurtz	Fiona Johnson

== Statistics ==
=== Final standings ===
Pos	Team	Pld	W	WD	LD	L	GF	GA	GD	Pts	Qualification
1st place, gold medalist(s)	NSW Arrows	13	12	1	0	0	48	10	+38	47	Gold Medal
2nd place, silver medalist(s)	QLD Scorchers	13	6	1	0	6	32	27	+5	26	Silver Medal
3rd place, bronze medalist(s)	WA Diamonds	13	11	0	1	1	41	13	+28	40	Bronze Medal
4	Canberra Strikers	13	5	0	0	8	16	28	−12	24	
5	VIC Vipers	13	8	0	1	4	38	21	+17	28	
6	Adelaide Suns	13	4	1	0	8	20	35	−15	14	
7	Territory Pearls	13	0	2	0	11	10	38	−28	6	
8	Tassie Van Demons	13	1	0	3	9	15	48	−33	7	

Source: Clearing House

=== Goalscorers ===
There were 220 goals scored in 52 matches, for an average of 4.23 goals per match.

12 goals

- Emily Hurtz

7 goals

- Rebecca Sanders
- Jodie Schulz
- Claire Messent
- Chantelle Ciallella

6 goals

- Laura Desmet
- Tegan Holcroft
- Amy Korner
- Piki Hamahona
- Jemma Buckley

5 goals

- Ebony Barber
- Jade Close
- Casey Eastham
- Susannah Harris
- Megan Rivers
- Stephanie Riordan
- Shelly Liddelow

4 goals

- Madonna Blyth
- Carly Simms
- Charlotte White
- Kary Chau
- Danielle Schubach
- Harriet Collins
- Samantha Gale

3 goals

- Amy Kelly
- Jill Dwyer
- Marnie Hudson
- Kayla Bashore
- Eloise Duay
- Nicole Geeves
- Georgia Nanscawen
- Sarah O'Connor
- Renee Trost
- Kobie McGurk
- Ashleigh Nelson
- Sian Smithson

2 goals

- María de la Paz Hernández
- Emma Taylor
- Belinda Brooks
- Olivia Chiu
- Tammy Eiser
- Rebecca Reuter
- Holly Evans
- Georgina Parker
- Janelle Pisani
- Rebecca Coulson
- Stacia Joseph
- Hana Peake
- Lisa Eglington
- Hope Munro

1 goal

- Anna Flanagan
- Peta Gallagher
- Karia Lucas
- Kate Hollywood
- Fiona Johnson
- Angela Marriner
- Ashleigh Morrison
- Kate O'Connell
- Emily Peris
- Lauren Powely
- Stephanie Purdy
- Prue Eiser
- Margaret Coleiro
- Jane Claxton
- Bianca Greenshields
- Rachel Hampton
- Hannah Calvert
- Nina Khoury
- Carla Bond
- Anna Burns
- Erica Trahar
- Amanda Calton
- Jayde Taylor

Source: Clearing House
