= 2006 March on Madrid Hockey Tournament =

Women's field hockey tournament

March on Madrid
Tournament details
- Host country: United States
- Dates: 17–27 August
- Teams: 4 (from 3 confederations)
- Venue: 2 (in 2 host cities)

Final positions
- Champions: Netherlands (1st title)
- Runner-up: Argentina
- Third place: Australia

Tournament statistics
- Matches played: 14
- Goals scored: 46 (3.29 per match)
- Top scorer: (Argentina) Luciana Aymar (5 goals)
- Best player: (Argentina) Luciana Aymar

The 2006 March on Madrid Hockey Tournament was a women's field hockey tournament, consisting of a series of test matches. It was held in Baltimore and Virginia Beach, from 17 to 27 August 2006.

The Netherlands won the tournament, defeating Argentina 4–2 in the final. Australia finished in third place after defeating the United States 4–2 in the third place match.

== Competition format ==
The tournament featured the national teams of Argentina, Australia, the Netherlands and the United States. The teams competed in a double round-robin format, with each team playing each other twice. Three points were awarded for a win, one for a draw, and none for a loss.

== Teams ==
Argentina

Head Coach: Gabriel Minadeo

1. Mariela Antoniska (GK)
3. Magdalena Aicega (C)
4. Rosario Luchetti
6. Ayelén Stepnik
7. Alejandra Gulla
8. Luciana Aymar
10. Soledad García
11. Carla Rebecchi
12. Mariana González Oliva
14. Mercedes Margalot
17. Florencia D'Elía
19. Mariné Russo
22. Gabriela Aguirre
24. Claudia Burkart
25. Agustina Bouza
26. Giselle Kañevsky
27. Noel Barrionuevo
Australia

Head Coach: Frank Murray

2. Suzanne Faulkner
3. Karen Smith
4. Casey Eastham
7. Kim Walker
9. Rebecca Sanders
11. Emily Halliday
12. Madonna Blyth
13. Wendy Beattie
14. Nicole Arrold
15. Kobie McGurk
19. Donna-Lee Patrick
20. Hayley Phipps
21. De-Anne Gilbert (GK)
24. Angela Skirving
27. Rachael Lynch (GK)
28. Hope Munro
29. Teneal Attard
31. Claire Messent
32. Nicole Hudson (C)
Netherlands

Head Coach: Marc Lammers

1. Lisanne de Roever (GK)
3. Eefke Mulder
4. Fatima Moreira de Melo
5. Jiske Snoeks
7. Marianne van Geenhuizen
8. Nienke Kremers
9. Wieke Dijkstra
10. Sylvia Karres
11. Maartje Goderie
12. Leonoor Voskamp
13. Minke Smabers
14. Minke Booij (C)
15. Janneke Schopman
16. Chantal de Bruijn
17. Maartje Paumen
18. Naomi van As
19. Ellen Hoog
20. Eveline de Haan (GK)
21. Sophie Polkamp
22. Fleur Engels (GK)
23. Kim Lammers
United States

Head Coach: Lee Bodimeade

1. Kayla Bashore
2. Melissa Leonetti
3. Angela Loy
4. Kelly Doton
6. Kristi Gannon
8. Rachel Dawson
9. Sarah Dawson
10. Tiffany Snow
11. Sara Silvetti
12. April Fronzoni
13. Keli Smith
14. Katelyn Falgowski
16. Barbara Weinberg (GK)
17. Carrie Lingo
18. Michelle Kasold
20. Kathleen O'Donnell
21. Claire Laubach
22. Kate Barber (C)
24. Dina Rizzo
25. Amy Tran (GK)
27. Lauren Crandall
28. Lauren Powley

== Officials ==
The following umpires were appointed by the International Hockey Federation to officiate the tournament:

- Stella Bartlema (NED)
- Mariana Elorza (ARG)
- Dorinda Martin (USA)
- Carol Metchette (IRE)
- Melissa Trivic (AUS)

== Results ==
=== Preliminary round ===
Pos	Team	Pld	W	D	L	GF	GA	GD	Pts	Qualification
1	Argentina	6	3	2	1	11	5	+6	11	Advanced to Final
2	Netherlands	6	3	1	2	8	8	0	10	Advanced to Final
3	Australia	6	2	2	2	10	7	+3	8	
4	United States (H)	6	1	1	4	5	14	−9	4	

Source: USA Field Hockey
Rules for classification: 1) points; 2) goal difference; 3) goals scored; 4) head-to-head result.
(H) Hosts

==== Fixtures ====
17 August 2006
17:30

Argentina	2–1	Australia
Gulla 12'; Aymar 56'	Report	Blyth 17'

University of Maryland, Baltimore
Umpires:
Carol Metchette (IRE)
Stella Bartlema (NED)

17 August 2006
19:30

United States	1–2	Netherlands
Snow 38'	Report	Van As 48'; Moreira de Melo 65'

University of Maryland, Baltimore
Umpires:
Melissa Trivic (AUS)
Mariana Elorza (ARG)

18 August 2006
17:30

Netherlands	1–1	Argentina
Mulder 61'	Report	Russo 47'

University of Maryland, Baltimore
Umpires:
Dorinda Martin (USA)
Carol Metchette (IRE)

18 August 2006
19:30

United States	1–1	Australia
Loy 15'	Report	K. Smith 18'

University of Maryland, Baltimore
Umpires:
Stella Bartlema (NED)
Mariana Elorza (ARG)

20 August 2006
11:00

Australia	1–2	Netherlands
Patrick 68'	Report	Karres 13'; Booij 33'

University of Maryland, Baltimore
Umpires:
Carol Metchette (IRE)
Dorinda Martin (USA)

20 August 2006
13:00

Argentina	1–2	United States
Aymar 30'	Report	Doton 6'; Loy 42'

University of Maryland, Baltimore
Umpires:
Stella Bartlema (NED)
Melissa Trivic (AUS)

23 August 2006
17:30

Argentina	2–0	Netherlands
Aguirre 28'; Margalot 65'	Report

Virginia Beach Sportsplex, Virginia Beach
Umpires:
Melissa Trivic (AUS)
Dorinda Martin (USA)

23 August 2006
19:30

Australia	3–1	United States
Faulkner 1'; Munro 31'; Phipps 63'	Report	Leonetti 49'

Virginia Beach Sportsplex, Virginia Beach
Umpires:
Mariana Elorza (ARG)
Carol Metchette (IRE)

24 August 2006
17:30

Netherlands	0–3	Australia
	Report	Messent 5'; Blyth 29'; Faulkner 57'

Virginia Beach Sportsplex, Virginia Beach
Umpires:
Carol Metchette (IRE)
Mariana Elorza (ARG)

24 August 2006
19:30

United States	0–4	Argentina
	Report	Aymar 3', 6', 57'; González Oliva 10'

Virginia Beach Sportsplex, Virginia Beach
Umpires:
Stella Bartlema (NED)
Melissa Trivic (AUS)

26 August 2006
17:30

Australia	1–1	Argentina
Faulkner 15'	Report	Gulla 35'

Virginia Beach Sportsplex, Virginia Beach
Umpires:
Dorinda Martin (USA)
Stella Bartlema (NED)

26 August 2006
19:30

Netherlands	3–0	United States
Paumen 10'; Karres 56'; Van As 64'	Report

Virginia Beach Sportsplex, Virginia Beach
Umpires:
Melissa Trivic (AUS)
Carol Metchette (IRE)

=== Classification round ===
==== Third and fourth place ====
27 August 2006
17:30

Australia	4–2	United States
K. Smith 10'; Patrick 33'; Hudson 36'; Munro 57'	Report	Smith 45'; Doton 51'

Virginia Beach Sportsplex, Virginia Beach
Umpires:
Stella Bartlema (NED)
Mariana Elorza (ARG)

==== Final ====
27 August 2006
19:30

Argentina	2–4	Netherlands
Gulla 25'; Bouza 56'	Report	Karres 10'; Paumen 33'; Lammers 63', 65'

Virginia Beach Sportsplex, Virginia Beach
Umpires:
Carol Metchette (IRE)
Melissa Trivic (AUS)

== Statistics ==
=== Final standings ===
Pos	Team	Pld	W	D	L	GF	GA	GD	Pts	Status
1st place, gold medalist(s)	Netherlands	7	4	1	2	12	10	+2	13	Tournament Champion
2nd place, silver medalist(s)	Argentina	7	3	2	2	13	9	+4	11	
3rd place, bronze medalist(s)	Australia	7	3	2	2	14	9	+5	11	
4	United States (H)	7	1	1	5	7	18	−11	4	

Source: USA Field Hockey
(H) Hosts

=== Goalscorers ===
There were 46 goals scored in 14 matches, for an average of 3.29 goals per match.

5 goals

- (Argentina) Luciana Aymar

3 goals

- (Argentina) Alejandra Gulla
- (Australia) Suzanne Faulkner
- (Netherlands) Sylvia Karres

2 goals

- (Australia) Madonna Blyth
- (Australia) Hope Munro
- (Australia) Donna-Lee Patrick
- (Australia) Karen Smith
- (Netherlands) Naomi van As
- (Netherlands) Kim Lammers
- (Netherlands) Maartje Paumen
- (United States) Kelly Doton
- (United States) Angela Loy

1 goal

- (Argentina) Gabriela Aguirre
- (Argentina) Agustina Bouza
- (Argentina) Mariana González Oliva
- (Argentina) Mercedes Margalot
- (Argentina) Mariné Russo
- (Australia) Nicole Hudson
- (Australia) Claire Messent
- (Australia) Hayley Phipps
- (Netherlands) Minke Booij
- (Netherlands) Eefke Mulder
- (Netherlands) Fatima Moreira de Melo
- (United States) Melissa Leonetti
- (United States) Keli Smith
- (United States) Tiffany Snow
