= 2007 Women's Good Luck Beijing Hockey Tournament =

Women's field hockey tournament

Good Luck Beijing
Tournament details
- Host country: China
- City: Beijing
- Teams: 4
- Venue: Olympic Green Hockey Field

Final positions
- Champions: Australia
- Runner-up: China
- Third place: Argentina

Tournament statistics
- Matches played: 8
- Goals scored: 28 (3.5 per match)
- Top scorer: (Australia) Nicole Hudson (3 goals)

The 2007 Women's Good Luck Beijing Hockey Tournament was an invitational international women's field hockey tournament, consisting of a series of test matches. The event, organised by the Chinese Hockey Association, was hosted in Beijing from 8–13 August 2007, and featured four of the top nations in women's field hockey. The tournament served as a test event for the 2008 Summer Olympics.

Australia won the tournament after defeating China 3–1 in penalties after the final finished a 2–2 draw.

== Competition format ==
The tournament featured the national teams of Argentina, Australia, South Africa, and the hosts, China, competing in a round-robin format, with each team playing each other once. Three points will be awarded for a win, one for a draw, and none for a loss.

Country	August 2007 FIH Ranking	Best World Cup finish	Best Olympic Games finish
Argentina	2	Champions (2002)	Runners-Up (2000)
Australia	4	Champions (1994, 1998)	Champions (1988, 1996, 2000)
China	5	Third Place (2002)	Fourth Place (2004)
South Africa	12	Seventh place (1998)	Ninth place (2004)

== Results ==
=== Pool ===
Pos	Team	Pld	W	D	L	GF	GA	GD	Pts	Qualification
1	Australia	3	3	0	0	9	0	+9	9	Final
2	China (H)	3	2	0	1	6	3	+3	6	Final
3	Argentina	3	1	0	2	6	5	+1	3	
4	South Africa	3	0	0	3	0	13	−13	0	

Source: FIH
Rules for classification: 1) Points; 2) Goal difference; 3) Goals scored; 4) Games won; 5) Head-to-head.
(H) Hosts

==== Fixtures ====
8 August 2007
17:00

China	3–0	Argentina
Ma 10', 40'; Tang 59'	Report

Stadium:
Olympic Green Hockey Field

8 August 2007
18:30

Australia	4–0	South Africa
Sanders 16'; Rivers 28'; Hollywood 31'; Hudson 43'	Report

Stadium:
Olympic Green Hockey Field

9 August 2007
09:30

Argentina	0–2	Australia
	Report	Hudson 32'; Rivers 57'

Stadium:
Olympic Green Hockey Field

9 August 2007
11:00

China	3–0	South Africa
Ren 28'; Li H. 47'; Tang 53'	Report

Stadium:
Olympic Green Hockey Field

11 August 2007
18:00

Argentina	6–0	South Africa
Rebecchi 21'; Maloberti 26'; Gulla 40'; Rojas 50'; Aguirre 53'; Roman 65'	Report

Stadium:
Olympic Green Hockey Field

11 August 2007
19:30

Australia	3–0	China
Munro 8'; Hudson 54'; Sanders 57'	Report

Stadium:
Olympic Green Hockey Field

=== Classification matches ===
==== Third and fourth place ====
13 August 2007
09:30

Argentina	2–1	South Africa
Aguirre 22'; Rebecchi 58'	Report	Russell 20'

Stadium:
Olympic Green Hockey Field

==== Final ====
13 August 2007
19:00

Australia	2–2	China
Blyth 18'; Munro 59'	Report	Chen Z. 28'; Song 57'
Penalties
	3–1

Stadium:
Olympic Green Hockey Field

== Statistics ==
=== Final standings ===
As per statistical convention in field hockey, matches decided in extra time are counted as wins and losses, while matches decided by penalty shoot-outs are counted as draws.

Pos	Team	Pld	W	D	L	GF	GA	GD	Pts	Final Result
1st place, gold medalist(s)	Australia	4	3	1	0	11	2	+9	10	Tournament Champion
2nd place, silver medalist(s)	China (H)	4	2	1	1	8	5	+3	7	
3rd place, bronze medalist(s)	Argentina	4	2	0	2	8	6	+2	6	
4	South Africa	4	0	0	4	1	15	−14	0	

Source: FIH
(H) Hosts

=== Goalscorers ===
There were 28 goals scored in 8 matches, for an average of 3.5 goals per match.

3 goals

- (Australia) Nicole Hudson

2 goals

- (Argentina) Gabriela Aguirre
- (Argentina) Carla Rebecchi
- (Australia) Hope Munro
- (Australia) Megan Rivers
- (Australia) Rebecca Sanders
- (China) Tang Chunling
- (China) Ma Yibo

1 goal

- (Argentina) Alejandra Gulla
- (Argentina) Daniela Maloberti
- (Argentina) Yanina Rojas
- (Argentina) Sofía Roman
- (Australia) Madonna Blyth
- (Australia) Kate Hollywood
- (China) Li Hongxia
- (China) Song Qingling
- (China) Ren Ye
- (China) Chen Zhaoxia
- (South Africa) Shelley Russell
