= 2009 Women's Hockey Spar Cup =

2009 Women's Hockey SPAR Cup
Tournament details
- Host country: South Africa
- City: Durban
- Teams: 4
- Venue: Queensmead Hockey Stadium

Final positions
- Champions: Australia (1st title)
- Runner-up: Argentina
- Third place: South Africa

Tournament statistics
- Matches played: 8
- Goals scored: 40 (5 per match)
- Top scorer(s): (Australia) Casey Eastham (Australia) Kate Hollywood (3 goals)
- Best player: (Argentina) Luciana Aymar

The 2009 Women's Hockey SPAR Cup was an invitational international women's field hockey tournament, consisting of a series of test matches. The event, organised by the South African Hockey Association, was hosted in Durban from 2–6 June 2009, and featured four of the top nations in women's field hockey.

Australia won the tournament after defeating Argentina 3–1 in final.

== Competition format ==
The tournament featured the national teams of Argentina, Australia, India, and the hosts, South Africa, competing in a round-robin format, with each team playing each other once. Three points will be awarded for a win, one for a draw, and none for a loss.

Country	June 2009 FIH Ranking	Best World Cup finish	Best Olympic Games finish
Argentina	2	Champions (2002)	Runners-Up (2000)
Australia	5	Champions (1994, 1998)	Champions (1988, 1996, 2000)
India	13	Fourth Place (1974)	Fourth Place (1980)
South Africa	12	Seventh place (1998)	Ninth place (2004)

== Results ==
=== Pool ===
Pos	Team	Pld	W	D	L	GF	GA	GD	Pts	Qualification
1	Argentina	3	2	1	0	12	4	+8	7	Final
2	Australia	3	2	1	0	6	3	+3	7	Final
3	South Africa (H)	3	1	0	2	5	5	0	3	
4	India	3	0	0	3	3	14	−11	0	

Source: Field Hockey
Rules for classification: 1) Points; 2) Goal difference; 3) Goals scored; 4) Games won; 5) Head-to-head.
(H) Hosts

==== Fixtures ====
2 June 2009
14:00

Australia	3–1	India
Hurtz 15'; Eastham 51'; McGurk 65'	Report	Thokchom 49'

Stadium:
Queensmead Hockey Stadium

2 June 2009
16:00

South Africa	1–3	Argentina
Vide. Ryan 27'	Report	Burkart 32', 68'; D'Elía 51'

Stadium:
Queensmead Hockey Stadium

3 June 2009
14:00

Argentina	2–2	Australia
D. Sruoga 20'; Rebecchi 25'	Report	Eastham 2'; Hollywood 12'

Stadium:
Queensmead Hockey Stadium

3 June 2009
16:00

South Africa	4–1	India
Vida Ryan 14', 33'; Vide. Ryan 23'; Woods 45'	Report	Ritu 63'

Stadium:
Queensmead Hockey Stadium

5 June 2009
14:00

Argentina	7–1	India
Barrionuevo 9', 37'; Dupuy 15'; J. Sruoga 19'; Gulla 31', 58'; Merino 70'	Report	Rani R. 66'

Stadium:
Queensmead Hockey Stadium

5 June 2009
16:00

Australia	1–0	South Africa
Hollywood 64'	Report

Stadium:
Queensmead Hockey Stadium

=== Classification matches ===
==== Third and fourth place ====
6 June 2009
12:30

South Africa	5–5	India
Fredericks 4', 32'; Taylor 16', 52'; Marescia 28'	Report	Saba 38', 64'; Rani R. 45'; Vandana 48'; Surinder 68'
Penalties
	5–3

Stadium:
Queensmead Hockey Stadium

==== Final ====
6 June 2009
15:00

Argentina	1–3	Australia
D'Elía 31'	Report	Eastham 38'; Hurtz 54'; Hollywood 64'

Stadium:
Queensmead Hockey Stadium

== Statistics ==
=== Final standings ===
As per statistical convention in field hockey, matches decided in extra time are counted as wins and losses, while matches decided by penalty shoot-outs are counted as draws.

Pos	Team	Pld	W	D	L	GF	GA	GD	Pts	Final Result
1st place, gold medalist(s)	Australia	4	3	1	0	9	4	+5	10	Tournament Champion
2nd place, silver medalist(s)	Argentina	4	2	1	1	13	7	+6	7	
3rd place, bronze medalist(s)	South Africa (H)	4	1	1	2	10	10	0	4	
4	India	4	0	1	3	8	19	−11	1	

Source: Field Hockey
(H) Hosts

=== Goalscorers ===
There were 40 goals scored in 8 matches, for an average of 5 goals per match.

3 goals

- (Australia) Casey Eastham
- (Australia) Kate Hollywood

2 goals

- (Argentina) Noel Barrionuevo
- (Argentina) Claudia Burkart
- (Argentina) Silvina D'Elía
- (Argentina) Alejandra Gulla
- (Australia) Emily Hurtz
- (India) Saba Anjum
- (India) Rani Rampal
- (South Africa) Farah Fredericks
- (South Africa) Vida Ryan
- (South Africa) Vidette Ryan
- (South Africa) Kathleen Taylor

1 goal

- (Argentina) Carla Dupuy
- (Argentina) Delfina Merino
- (Argentina) Carla Rebecchi
- (Argentina) Daniela Sruoga
- (Argentina) Josefina Sruoga
- (Australia) Kobie McGurk
- (India) Vandana Kataria
- (India) Surinder Kaur
- (India) Ranjita Devi Thokchom
- (India) Ritu Rani
- (South Africa) Marsha Marescia
- (South Africa) Kate Woods
