= 2006 Women's Four Nations Hockey Tournament (Córdoba) =

Four Nations
Tournament details
- Host country: Argentina
- City: Córdoba
- Teams: 4 (from 3 confederations)
- Venue: Club La Tablada

Final positions
- Champions: Argentina
- Runner-up: Netherlands
- Third place: Australia

Tournament statistics
- Matches played: 8
- Goals scored: 17 (2.13 per match)
- Top scorer(s): (Argentina) Soledad García (England) Kate Walsh (Netherlands) Sylvia Karres (2 goals)
- Best player: (Netherlands) Minke Booij

The 2006 Women's Four Nations Hockey Tournament was a women's field hockey tournament, consisting of a series of test matches. It was held in Córdoba, Argentina, from January 24 to 28, 2006, and featured four of the top nations in women's field hockey.

== Competition format ==
The tournament featured the national teams of Australia, England, the Netherlands, and the hosts, Argentina, competing in a round-robin format, with each team playing each other once. Three points were awarded for a win, one for a draw, and none for a loss.

Country	November 2005 FIH Ranking	Best World Cup finish	Best Olympic Games finish
Argentina	2	Champions (2002)	Runners-Up (2000)
Australia	3	Champions (1994, 1998)	Champions (1988, 1996, 2000)
England	9	Fourth Place (1990)	Third Place (1984)
Netherlands	1	Champions (1974, 1978, 1983, 1986, 1990)	Champions (1984)

== Officials ==
The following umpires were appointed by the International Hockey Federation to officiate the tournament:

- Louise Knipe (ENG)
- Carol Metchette (IRE)
- Mariana Reydo (ARG)
- Melissa Trivic (AUS)
- Mirjam Wessel (NED)

== Results ==
All times are local (Argentina Standard Time).

=== Preliminary round ===
Pos	Team	Pld	W	D	L	GF	GA	GD	Pts	Qualification
1	Argentina (H)	3	2	1	0	5	3	+2	7	Advanced to Final
2	Netherlands	3	0	3	0	4	4	0	3	Advanced to Final
3	England	3	0	2	1	4	5	−1	2	
4	Australia	3	0	2	1	3	4	−1	2	

Source: CAH
Rules for classification: 1) points; 2) goal difference; 3) goals scored; 4) head-to-head result.
(H) Hosts

==== Fixtures ====
24 January 2006
18:30

Netherlands	1–1	England
Karres 50'	Report	Wooding 66'

Umpires:
Carol Metchette (IRE)
Mariana Reydo (ARG)

24 January 2006
21:00

Argentina	1–0	Australia
García 38'	Report

Umpires:
Mirjam Wessel (NED)
Louise Knipe (ENG)

25 January 2006
18:30

Australia	1–1	Netherlands
Faulkner 56'	Report	Lammers 1'

Umpires:
Mariana Reydo (ARG)
Carol Metchette (IRE)

25 January 2006
21:00

Argentina	2–1	England
Doreski 30'; García 63'	Report	Walsh 68'

Umpires:
Melissa Trivic (AUS)
Mirjam Wessel (NED)

27 January 2006
18:30

Australia	2–2	England
Taylor 27'; Blyth 32'	Report	Walsh 20'; Danson 67'

Umpires:
Carol Metchette (IRE)
Mariana Reydo (ARG)

27 January 2006
21:00

Netherlands	2–2	Argentina
Booij 30'; Karres 52'	Report	Aicega 55'; Gulla 61'

Umpires:
Kylie Seymour (AUS)
Louise Knipe (ENG)

=== Classification round ===
==== Third and fourth place ====
28 January 2006
18:30

England	0–0	Australia
	Report
Penalties
Walsh (penalty shoot-out scored); Richardson (penalty shoot-out scored); Rogers (penalty shoot-out missed); Herbert (penalty shoot-out scored); Cullen (penalty shoot-out missed)	3–4	(penalty shoot-out missed) Blyth; (penalty shoot-out scored) Skirving; (penalty shoot-out scored) Sanders; (penalty shoot-out scored) Arrold; (penalty shoot-out scored) Halliday

Umpires:
Mirjam Wessel (NED)
Mariana Reydo (ARG)

==== Final ====
28 January 2006
21:00

Argentina	1–0	Netherlands
Aymar 3'	Report

Umpires:
Louise Knipe (ENG)
Melissa Trivic (AUS)

== Awards ==
The following awards were presented at the conclusion of the tournament:

Player of the Tournament	Top Goalscorers	Goalkeeper of the Tournament	Fair Play
(Netherlands) Minke Booij	3 Players (see list below)	(England) Elizabeth Storry	England

== Statistics ==
=== Final standings ===
Pos	Team	Pld	W	D	L	GF	GA	GD	Pts	Status
1st place, gold medalist(s)	Argentina (H)	4	3	1	0	6	3	+3	10	Tournament Champion
2nd place, silver medalist(s)	Netherlands	4	0	3	1	4	5	−1	3	
3rd place, bronze medalist(s)	Australia	4	0	3	1	3	4	−1	3	
4	England	4	0	3	1	4	5	−1	3	

Source: CAH
(H) Hosts

=== Goalscorers ===
There were 17 goals scored in 8 matches, for an average of 2.12 goals per match.

2 goals

- (Argentina) Soledad García
- (England) Kate Walsh
- (Netherlands) Sylvia Karres

1 goal

- (Argentina) Magdalena Aicega
- (Argentina) Luciana Aymar
- (Argentina) Natalí Doreski
- (Argentina) Alejandra Gulla
- (Australia) Madonna Blyth
- (Australia) Suzanne Faulkner
- (Australia) Sarah Taylor
- (England) Alexandra Danson
- (England) Lisa Wooding
- (Netherlands) Minke Booij
- (Netherlands) Kim Lammers
