= Park Yeong-sun =

Park Yeong-sun or Pak Yong-sun (Korean: 박영순) may refer to:

- Pak Yong-sun (politician) (c. 1905/1909?–1987), North Korean male politician
- Pak Yung-sun (1956–1987), North Korean female table tennis player
- Park Young-soon (born 1985), South Korean female field hockey player
