= 2006 Women's Hockey World Cup =

Hockey Copa del Mundo Femenino 2006
- Official logo

Tournament details
- Host country: Spain
- City: Madrid
- Dates: 27 September – 8 October
- Teams: 12
- Venue: Club de Campo Villa de Madrid

Final positions
- Champions: Netherlands (6th title)
- Runner-up: Australia
- Third place: Argentina

Tournament statistics
- Matches played: 42
- Goals scored: 116 (2.76 per match)
- Top scorer: (Netherlands) Sylvia Karres (6 goals)
- Best player: (Spain) Núria Camón

The 2006 Women's Hockey World Cup was the 11th edition of the Women's Hockey World Cup field hockey tournament. It was held from 27 September to 8 October 2006 in Madrid, Spain.

The Netherlands won the tournament for the sixth time after defeating Australia 3–1 in the final. Defending champions Argentina won the third-place match by defeating Spain 5–0. Dutch striker Sylvia Karres was the tournament's top-scorer with 6 goals.

== Qualification ==
Each of the continental champions from five federations and the host nation received an automatic berth. The European federation received one extra quota based upon the FIH World Rankings. Alongside the five teams qualifying through the Qualifier, twelve teams competed in this tournament.

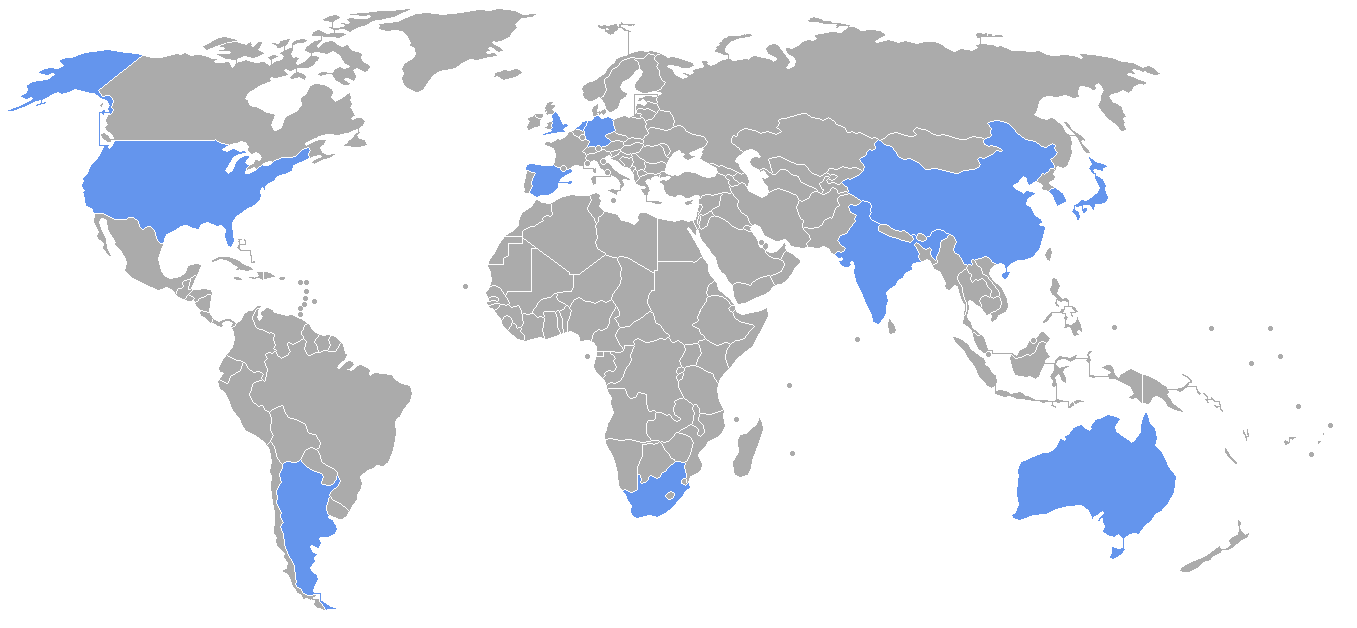
Participating nations

Dates	Event	Location	Qualifier(s)
Host nation			Spain
1–8 February 2004	2004 Hockey Asia Cup	New Delhi, India	India
21–28 April 2004	2004 Pan American Cup	Bridgetown, Barbados	Argentina
14–20 August 2005	2005 EuroHockey Nations Championship	Dublin, Ireland	Netherlands; Germany
2–8 October 2005	2005 Hockey African Cup for Nations	Pretoria, South Africa	South Africa
29 October–5 November 2005	2005 Oceania Cup	Auckland, New Zealand; Sydney, Australia	Australia
25 April–6 May 2006	Qualifier	Rome, Italy	England; South Korea; United States; Japan; China

== Umpires ==
Below are the 14 umpires appointed by the International Hockey Federation to officiate matches in the tournament:

- Chieko Akiyama (JPN)
- Julie Ashton-Lucy (AUS)
- Caroline Brunekreef (NED)
- Ute Conen (GER)
- Marelize de Klerk (RSA)
- Carolina de la Fuente (ARG)
- Jean Duncan (SCO)
- Sarah Garnett (NZL)
- Soledad Iparraguirre (ARG)
- Anne McRae (SCO)
- Miao Lin (CHN)
- Gina Spitaleri (ITA)
- Minka Woolley (AUS)
- Kazuko Yasueda (JPN)

== Results ==
All times are Central European Summer Time (UTC+02:00)

=== First round ===
==== Pool A ====
Pos	Team	Pld	W	D	L	GF	GA	GD	Pts	Qualification
1	Netherlands	5	4	1	0	12	3	+9	13	Semi-finals
2	Spain	5	3	1	1	6	5	+1	10	Semi-finals
3	England	5	2	2	1	6	5	+1	8	
4	Germany	5	2	1	2	6	5	+1	7	
5	China	5	1	0	4	5	13	−8	3	
6	India	5	0	1	4	7	11	−4	1	

Source: FIH
Rules for classification: 1) points; 2) goal difference; 3) goals scored; 4) head-to-head result.

27 September 2006
12:00

Netherlands	3–2	India
Paumen 3'; Lammers 31'; Karres 37'	Report	Surinder 49', 66'

Umpires:
Carolina de la Fuente (ARG)
Chieko Akiyama (JPN)

27 September 2006
14:30

China	2–3	England
Ma 27'; Ren 40'	Report	Danson 12'; Wright 29'; Cullen 55'

Umpires:
Julie Ashton-Lucy (AUS)
Ute Conen (GER)

27 September 2006
16:00

Spain	1–0	Germany
Huertas 56'	Report

Umpires:
Soledad Iparraguirre (ARG)
Sarah Garnett (NZL)

29 September 2006
14:00

England	0–1	Netherlands
	Report	Schopman 13'

Umpires:
Marelize de Klerk (RSA)
Minka Woolley (AUS)

29 September 2006
16:00

China	0–1	Spain
	Report	Muñoz 11'

Umpires:
Kazuko Yasueda (JPN)
Gina Spitaleri (ITA)

29 September 2006
18:00

India	2–3	Germany
Surinder 34'; Kharb 61'	Report	Kühn 21'; Haase 63'; Keller 65'

Umpires:
Miao Lin (CHN)
Anne McRae (SCO)

1 October 2006
12:00

Netherlands	2–0	Spain
Mulder 6'; Van As 42'	Report

Umpires:
Anne McRae (SCO)
Ute Conen (GER)

1 October 2006
14:00

India	1–1	England
Surinder 57'	Report	Rogers 47'

Umpires:
Jean Duncan (SCO)
Caroline Brunekreef (NED)

1 October 2006
16:00

Germany	3–1	China
Stöckel 45'; Müller 51'; Haase 61'	Report	Sun Z. 53'

Umpires:
Carolina de la Fuente (ARG)
Julie Ashton-Lucy (AUS)

3 October 2006
12:00

England	1–0	Germany
Richardson 38'	Report

Umpires:
Sarah Garnett (NZL)
Chieko Akiyama (JPN)

3 October 2006
14:00

China	1–6	Netherlands
Ma 58'	Report	Karres 16', 34', 42'; Lammers 47', 48', 66'

Umpires:
Soledad Iparraguirre (ARG)
Minka Woolley (AUS)

3 October 2006
16:00

Spain	3–2	India
Muñoz 10'; Sánchez 30', 43'	Report	Surinder 17'; Anjum 48'

Umpires:
Marelize de Klerk (RSA)
Carolina de la Fuente (ARG)

4 October 2006
12:00

Netherlands	0–0	Germany
	Report

Umpires:
Gina Spitaleri (ITA)
Chieko Akiyama (JPN)

4 October 2006
14:00

India	0–1	China
	Report	Fu 25'

Umpires:
Sarah Garnett (NZL)
Julie Ashton-Lucy (AUS)

4 October 2006
16:00

Spain	1–1	England
Cruz 10'	Report	Clewlow 65'

Umpires:
Soledad Iparraguirre (ARG)
Minka Woolley (AUS)

==== Pool B ====
Pos	Team	Pld	W	D	L	GF	GA	GD	Pts	Qualification
1	Australia	5	4	1	0	11	4	+7	13	Semi-finals
2	Argentina	5	3	1	1	9	8	+1	10	Semi-finals
3	United States	5	2	1	2	6	6	0	7	
4	Japan	5	1	2	2	6	5	+1	5	
5	South Korea	5	1	1	3	5	8	−3	4	
6	South Africa	5	0	2	3	3	9	−6	2	

Source: FIH
Rules for classification: 1) points; 2) goal difference; 3) goals scored; 4) head-to-head result.

27 September 2006
12:30

South Korea	2–1	Japan
Park Y. 10', 58'	Report	Chiba 8'

Umpires:
Jean Duncan (SCO)
Minka Woolley (AUS)

27 September 2006
14:00

Australia	1–0	South Africa
Blyth 34'	Report

Umpires:
Kazuko Yasueda (JPN)
Anne McRae (SCO)

27 September 2006
18:00

Argentina	2–1	United States
García 3'; Aicega 32'	Report	Doton 35'

Umpires:
Gina Spitaleri (ITA)
Marelize de Klerk (RSA)

28 September 2006
14:00

South Korea	0–0	South Africa
	Report

Umpires:
Caroline Brunekreef (NED)
Ute Conen (GER)

28 September 2006
16:00

Australia	3–1	United States
Taylor 8'; Hudson 34'; Skirving 57'	Report	Doton 11'

Umpires:
Carolina de la Fuente (ARG)
Sarah Garnett (NZL)

28 September 2006
18:00

Argentina	3–2	Japan
Luchetti 9'; García 14'; Margalot 41'	Report	Chiba 70'; Kimura 70+'

Umpires:
Miao Lin (CHN)
Julie Ashton-Lucy (AUS)

30 September 2006
14:00

South Korea	3–4	Australia
Kim Ju. 6'; Choi 35'; Park M. 63'	Report	Munro 17', 34'; Hudson 18'; Smith 23'

Umpires:
Chieko Akiyama (JPN)
Marelize de Klerk (RSA)

30 September 2006
16:00

United States	0–0	Japan
	Report

Umpires:
Soledad Iparraguirre (ARG)
Caroline Brunekreef (NED)

30 September 2006
18:00

South Africa	2–2	Argentina
Wilson 40'; Bright 45'	Report	Margalot 29'; Luchetti 67'

Umpires:
Jean Duncan (SCO)
Sarah Garnett (NZL)

2 October 2006
12:00

Japan	0–0	Australia
	Report

Umpires:
Gina Spitaleri (ITA)
Miao Lin (CHN)

2 October 2006
14:00

South Africa	1–3	United States
Marescia 44'	Report	Loy 13'; Lingo 24'; Fronzoni 52'

Umpires:
Julie Ashton-Lucy (AUS)
Chieko Akiyama (JPN)

2 October 2006
16:00

Argentina	2–0	South Korea
Gulla 23'; Aymar 30'	Report

Umpires:
Kazuko Yasueda (JPN)
Minka Woolley (AUS)

4 October 2006
12:30

South Africa	0–3	Japan
	Report	Komori 3', 29'; Miura 9'

Umpires:
Jean Duncan (SCO)
Carolina de la Fuente (ARG)

4 October 2006
14:30

South Korea	0–1	United States
	Report	Barber 31'

Umpires:
Miao Lin (CHN)
Marelize de Klerk (RSA)

4 October 2006
18:00

Australia	3–0	Argentina
Beattie 10', 28'; Taylor 52'	Report

Umpires:
Ute Conen (GER)
Anne McRae (SCO)

=== Ninth to twelfth place classification ===
Crossover
6 October 2006
China	4
South Africa	0
6 October 2006
South Korea	4
India	1

Ninth place
7 October 2006
China	1
South Korea	2
Eleventh place
7 October 2006
South Africa	0
India	1

==== Crossover ====
6 October 2006
12:30

China	4–0	South Africa
Ren 14'; Ma 18'; Sun Z. 29'; Tang 70'	Report

Umpires:
Caroline Brunekreef (NED)
Chieko Akiyama (JPN)

6 October 2006
15:00

South Korea	4–1	India
Park M. 23'; Kim Ju. 26'; Park Y. 28', 30'	Report	Toppo 64'

Umpires:
Anne McRae (SCO)
Carolina de la Fuente (ARG)

==== Eleventh and twelfth place ====
7 October 2006
18:00

South Africa	0–1	India
	Report	Jyoti 28'

Umpires:
Miao Lin (CHN)
Anne McRae (SCO)

==== Ninth and tenth place ====
7 October 2006
19:00

China	1–2	South Korea
Ren 70'	Report	Choi 10'; Park M. 13'

Umpires:
Jean Duncan (SCO)
Carolina de la Fuente (ARG)

=== Fifth to eighth place classification ===
Crossover
6 October 2006
England	0
Japan	2
6 October 2006
United States	1
Germany	0

Fifth place
7 October 2006
Japan	1
United States	0
Seventh place
8 October 2006
England	2
Germany	1

==== Crossover ====
6 October 2006
11:30

England	0–2	Japan
	Report	Chiba 42'; Morimoto 62'

Umpires:
Marelize de Klerk (RSA)
Gina Spitaleri (ITA)

6 October 2006
14:00

United States	1–0	Germany
Snow 37'	Report

Umpires:
Minka Woolley (AUS)
Kazuko Yasueda (JPN)

==== Seventh and eighth place ====
8 October 2006
12:00

England	2–1	Germany
Rogers 15'; Walker 35'	Report	Stöckel 43'

Umpires:
Chieko Akiyama (JPN)
Minka Woolley (AUS)

==== Fifth and sixth place ====
7 October 2006
16:30

Japan	1–0	United States
Chiba 40'	Report

Umpires:
Ute Conen (GER)
Gina Spitaleri (ITA)

=== First to fourth place classification ===
Semi-finals
6 October 2006
Netherlands	3
Argentina	1
6 October 2006
Australia (a.e.t.)	1
Spain	0

Final
8 October 2006
Netherlands	3
Australia	1
Third place
8 October 2006
Argentina	5
Spain	0

==== Semifinals ====
6 October 2006
16:30

Netherlands	3–1	Argentina
Karres 13' van Geenhuizen 45'; Lammers 60'	Report	Hernández 64'

Umpires:
Julie Ashton-Lucy (AUS)
Ute Conen (GER)

6 October 2006
19:00

Australia	1–0 (a.e.t.)	Spain
Faulkner 72'	Report

Umpires:
Soledad Iparraguirre (ARG)
Sarah Garnett (NZL)

==== Third and fourth place ====
8 October 2006
14:30

Argentina	5–0	Spain
Hernández 2', 6', 12'; Russo 51'; Gulla 53'	Report

Umpires:
Julie Ashton-Lucy (AUS)
Marelize de Klerk (RSA)

==== Final ====
8 October 2006
17:00

Netherlands	3–1	Australia
Paumen 41', 67'; Karres 55'	Report	Sanders 47'

Umpires:
Soledad Iparraguirre (ARG)
Sarah Garnett (NZL)

== Awards ==
Top Goalscorer	Player of the Tournament	Goalkeeper of the Tournament	Young Player of the Tournament	Fair Play Trophy
(Netherlands) Sylvia Karres	(Spain) Núria Camón	(United States) Amy Tran	(Argentina) Carla Rebecchi	South Africa

== Statistics ==
=== Final standings ===
Pos	Grp	Team	Pld	W	D	L	GF	GA	GD	Pts	Final result
1	A	Netherlands	7	6	1	0	18	5	+13	19	Gold medal
2	B	Australia	7	5	1	1	13	7	+6	16	Silver medal
3	B	Argentina	7	4	1	2	15	11	+4	13	Bronze medal
4	A	Spain	7	3	1	3	6	11	−5	10	Fourth place
5	B	Japan	7	3	2	2	9	5	+4	11	Eliminated in group stage
6	B	United States	7	3	1	3	7	7	0	10	Eliminated in group stage
7	A	England	7	3	2	2	8	8	0	11	Eliminated in group stage
8	A	Germany	7	2	1	4	7	7	0	7	Eliminated in group stage
9	B	South Korea	7	3	1	3	11	10	+1	10	Eliminated in group stage
10	A	China	7	2	0	5	10	15	−5	6	Eliminated in group stage
11	A	India	7	1	1	5	9	15	−6	4	Eliminated in group stage
12	B	South Africa	7	0	2	5	3	14	−11	2	Eliminated in group stage

Source: FIH

=== Goalscorers ===
There were 116 goals scored in 42 matches, for an average of 2.76 goals per match.

6 goals

- (Netherlands) Sylvia Karres

5 goals

- (India) Surinder Kaur
- (Netherlands) Kim Lammers

4 goals

- (Argentina) María de la Paz Hernández
- (Japan) Kaori Chiba
- (South Korea) Park Young-Soon

3 goals

- (China) Ren Ye
- (China) Ma Yibo
- (Netherlands) Maartje Paumen
- (South Korea) Park Mi-Hyun

2 goals

- (Argentina) Soledad García
- (Argentina) Alejandra Gulla
- (Argentina) Rosario Luchetti
- (Argentina) Mercedes Margalot
- (Australia) Wendy Beattie
- (Australia) Nikki Hudson
- (Australia) Hope Munro
- (Australia) Sarah Taylor
- (China) Sun Zhen
- (England) Chloe Rogers
- (Germany) Mandy Haase
- (Germany) Maike Stöckel
- (Japan) Tomomi Komori
- (South Korea) Choi Eun-Young
- (South Korea) Kim Jung-Hee
- (Spain) Silvia Muñoz
- (Spain) Pilar Sánchez
- (United States) Kelly Doton

1 goal

- (Argentina) Magdalena Aicega
- (Argentina) Luciana Aymar
- (Argentina) Mariné Russo
- (Australia) Madonna Blyth
- (Australia) Suzie Faulkner
- (Australia) Rebecca Sanders
- (Australia) Angie Skirving
- (Australia) Karen Smith
- (China) Fu Baorong
- (China) Tang Chunling
- (England) Melanie Clewlow
- (England) Crista Cullen
- (England) Alex Danson
- (England) Helen Richardson
- (England) Rachel Walker
- (England) Lucilla Wright
- (Germany) Natascha Keller
- (Germany) Anke Kühn
- (Germany) Silke Müller
- (India) Saba Anjum Karim
- (India) Mamta Kharb
- (India) Jyoti Sunita Kullu
- (India) Binita Toppo
- (Japan) Chie Kimura
- (Japan) Keiko Miura
- (Japan) Sakae Morimoto
- (Netherlands) Eefke Mulder
- (Netherlands) Janneke Schopman
- (Netherlands) Naomi van As
- (Netherlands) Miek van Geenhuizen
- (South Africa) Tarryn Bright
- (South Africa) Marsha Marescia
- (South Africa) Jennifer Wilson
- (Spain) Montse Cruz
- (Spain) Raquel Huertas
- (United States) Kate Barber
- (United States) April Fronzoni
- (United States) Carrie Lingo
- (United States) Angie Loy
- (United States) Tiffany Snow

Source: FIH
