= Sun Zhen (field hockey) =

Chinese field hockey player

Medal record

Women's field hockey

Representing China

Asian Games
Gold medal – first place	2006 Doha	Team

Asia Cup
Bronze medal – third place	2007 Hong Kong	

Sun Zhen is a Chinese-born professional field hockey player who participated in the 2006 Women's Hockey World Cup in Madrid, Spain playing for China. She was part of the Chinese team that became the 2006 Asian Games champions in women's field hockey.
