= Vida Ryan =

South African field hockey player

Jackson Vida Ryan (born 20 May 1984) is a South African field hockey player who competed in the 2008 Summer Olympics. Their twin sibling is Vidette Ryan.
