= Amy Kelly =

American historian and writer

- Born: Amy Ruth Kelly; May 5, 1877; Port Clinton, Ohio, U.S.
- Died: January 1, 1962 (aged 84); Miami, Florida, U.S.
- Occupation(s): Educator and historian
- Known for: Eleanor of Aquitaine and the Four Kings

Amy Kelly (May 5, 1877 – January 1, 1962) was an American educator and historian known for her life's work, Eleanor of Aquitaine and the Four Kings.

== Early life and education ==
Amy Ruth Kelly was born on May 5, 1877, in Port Clinton, Ohio, the oldest of three children of Malcolm Kelly and Susan Smith Kelly. Kelly completed her bachelor's degree at Oberlin College, her master's at Wellesley College, and capped her education with a stint at Harvard Summer School and a trip to France.

== Career as an educator ==
Upon returning from France, Kelly took the job of English department head at Lake Erie College. Her next move was to Wellesley as an instructor and then as an associate professor of English. While at Wellesley, she was hired as headmistress at Bryn Mawr School. In 1928, Katherine Scarborough of The Baltimore Sun wrote a full-page sketch about Kelly's career to that date, including the work she did in helping to plan a curriculum for Bennington College, which was expected at that time to open in 1930. Scarborough wrote, "Characteristically, Miss Kelly insists that her conclusions must not be regarded as an accepted program for the college, but it is an accepted fact by those closely in touch with the new institution that they will be followed in the main, if not in their entirety."

Kelly suggested that a student's entrance be based on school records and "evidences of seriousness of purpose and promise of success". She proposed that traditional courses like Latin and math not be required for all students but rather that the curriculum should serve a student's objective. Kelly also advised that students be guided in learning to enjoy their free time. Scarborough quoted Kelly, "[If] college girls were surrounded by a group of studios and shops where various arts and crafts are being followed by professionals who would welcome amateurs as apprentices, many of them would be able to find something which would offer diversion at the moment, but would provide them with an interest which they might pursue throughout the rest of their lives."

Journalist, author, and fellow Wellesley alumna, Marjory Stoneman Douglas, believed that it was while at Bryn Mawr that Kelly began "the long, long years of study and research [on Eleanor of Aquitaine] which absorbed all the rest of her professional life." During those years, she spent her summers traveling to Europe and the Middle East, studying French, German, Italian, and Latin documents.

In 1942, after 24 years at Wellesley, Kelly retired.

== Eleanor of Aquitaine and the Four Kings ==
For most of the remainder of the 1940s, Kelly wrote and edited her manuscript. In 1948, she sent the manuscript to Harvard University Press, who published the final product, Eleanor of Aquitaine and the Four Kings, in 1950. The book became #10 on the New York Times bestseller list - a first for the publisher - and stayed on the list for 13 weeks.

Norman Cousins, editor of The Saturday Review of Literature, said of Kelly's book: "It is when the critic approaches the assessment of the author's style that superlatives seem feeble. Prose of this quality has not appeared in America in many a long day. Readers were unanimous that here was a narrative fashioned with a jeweler's skill by a writer of immaculate taste, a vast vocabulary, and unsurpassed grasp of her subject."

== Personal life and death ==
Kelly spent her final years in Miami, Florida, with her sister, Elizabeth. Stoneman Douglas wrote that during those years Kelly was "never very well, often very ill, and for the last year, dying." She died on New Year's Day 1962 in Miami. In addition to her sister, she was survived by her ward, Margaret Malcolm of Cape Cod, Massachusetts.

== See also ==
- The four kings:
  - Louis VII of France - Eleanor's first husband
  - Henry II of England - her second husband
  - Richard I of England - one of her five sons with Henry
  - John, King of England - their youngest child
- The Lion in Winter - play and film about Henry II of England, Eleanor of Aquitaine, and their sons set at Christmas 1183
- Society for Medieval Feminist Scholarship - academic organization
- Women in the Middle Ages - lengthy article on women's roles in the Middle Ages
