= Binita Toppo =

Indian field hockey player

Medal record

Representing India

Women's field hockey

Asia Cup
Gold medal – first place	2004 New Delhi	
Silver medal – second place	2009 Bangkok	

Asian Games
Bronze medal – third place	2006 Doha	Team

Asian Champions Trophy
Bronze medal – third place	2010 Busan	

Binita Toppo (born 21 November 1980) is an Indian former field hockey player who played for the India women's field hockey team. She was part of the team that won the 2004 Women's Hockey Asia Cup. Toppo is currently employed with Western Railways.

== Early life ==
Toppo was born in Lulkidihi in the Sundergarh district of Odisha. She lost her father at a very young age and her mother worked at a school as a cleaner.

== Education ==
Toppo studied at the Mahindra College in Ranchi. She trained at the Panposh Sports Hostel, Rourkela. Toppo completed coaches' training programs at Tata Football Academy, Jamshedpur and Baichung Bhutia Football Schools, Delhi.

== Career and training ==
Toppo made it to the Indian national team in 2004. Prior to that, she had won many local tournaments in the state. She led the Indian women's hockey team in the 2007 Women's Asia Cup. She led the U-16 Jharkhand state team along with studying at school. She ranked position 5 in Common Wealth Sport in the year 2010.

Toppo played at the full back position in the Indian women's hockey team in the domestic circuit.

In the international circuit, Toppo played

- Asian Games in Doha in December 2006
- Asia Cup in Delhi in February 2004
- Indira Gandhi Gold Cup in Delhi in October 2005
- Asian Tour, a four nation tournament in Singapore in August 2004.
- Australian Tour, 3 nation series in April 2004

Toppo also represented India in the 2006 World Cup in Madrid.

== Recognition ==
In May 2011, Toppo was felicitated by the then chief minister Naveen Patnaik at Jaydev Bhawan, Bhubaneshwar for her contributions to Indian hockey.
