= Park Young-soon =

South Korean field hockey player

- Hangul: 박영순
- RR: Bak Yeongsun
- MR: Pak Yŏngsun

Park Young-soon (born 9 August 1985) is a South Korean professional field hockey player who has played for the South Korea women's national field hockey team. She participated in the 2006 Women's Hockey World Cup in Madrid, Spain.
