= Melissa Leonetti =

American field hockey player

Melissa ("Mel") Leonetti is a field hockey defender from the United States, who earned her first career cap versus Canada on January 23, 2004, at Stanford, California. Leonetti attended the Old Dominion University.

== International senior competitions ==
- 2004 – Pan American Cup, Bridgetown (2nd)
- 2005 – Champions Challenge, Virginia Beach (5th)
- 2006 – World Cup Qualifier, Rome (4th)
- 2006 – World Cup, Madrid (6th)
