= Choi Eun-young (field hockey) =

South Korean field hockey player

Choi Eun-young is a South Korean-born professional field hockey player who has played for the South Korea women's national team. She participated in the 2006 Women's Hockey World Cup held in Madrid, Spain.

.
