= Kayla Bashore Smedley =

American field hockey player

Medal record

Women's field hockey

Representing United States

Pan American Games
Gold medal – first place	2011 Guadalajara	Team

Kayla Bashore-Smedley (born February 20, 1983, in Daegu, South Korea) is an American field hockey defender and midfielder. Now living in Bloomington, Indiana, she was a student of the Indiana University, where she played for the Hoosiers, and was the first player from that university to make the US National Field Hockey team. She represented the USA at the 2008 Summer Olympics.

== Background ==
Bashore-Smedley grew up in a small town in Pennsylvania, and found her sporting love initially while playing soccer, rather than field hockey. After picking up her first field hockey stick as a high school student, she was recruited by that school's field hockey coach, and soon excelled at her new sport. A graduate of Hamburg Area High School, she went on to study at Indiana University, and played for that institution's team for four years. Still a senior there when she was asked to join the United States National Field Hockey Team, she went through rigorous training with her teammates at their training facility in San Diego, California. When her team qualified for the 2008 Olympics in Beijing, China, Bashore-Smedley participated, and was supported by her family, who also made the trip overseas. Although her team did not win any medals that year, they did beat their biggest rival (Argentina) during the 2012 Olympics in London, United Kingdom. Following more than 100 international appearances, Bashore-Smedley then retired in 2013.

== International senior competitions ==
- 2006 – World Cup Qualifier, Rome (4th)
- 2006 – World Cup, Madrid (6th)
- 2007 – Pan American Games, Rio de Janeiro (2nd)
- 2008 – Summer Olympics (8th)
