= Surinder Kaur (field hockey) =

Indian field hockey player

Personal information
- Born: 12 July 1982 (age 43)
Medal record
Women's field hockey
Representing India
Commonwealth Games
Silver medal – second place	2006 Melbourne	Team
Asian Games
Silver medal – second place	1998 Bangkok	Team
Bronze medal – third place	2006 Doha	Team
Asia Cup
Gold medal – first place	2004 New Delhi
Silver medal – second place	1999 New Delhi
Silver medal – second place	2009 Bangkok
Asian Champions Trophy
Bronze medal – third place	2010 Busan
Champions Challenge
Bronze medal – third place	2002 Johannesburg	Team

Surinder Kaur (born 12 July 1982 in Shahbad Markanda, Kurukshetra District, Haryana) is an Indian former field hockey player, who represented the India women's national field hockey team. She hails from Haryana and played with the team when it won Gold at the 2004 Hockey Asia Cup.

In the 2006 Women's Hockey World Cup, where India was eliminated at the group stage, having finished at the bottom of their group without a win in 5 matches, Surindar scored 5 of India's 7 goals in those 5 matches.
