= Ren Ye =

Chinese field hockey player

Personal information
- Born: July 13, 1986 (age 39) Fushun, Liaoning
Medal record
Women's field hockey
Representing China
Olympic Games
Silver medal – second place	2008 Beijing	Team
Asian Games
Gold medal – first place	2006 Doha	Team
Gold medal – first place	2010 Guangzhou	Team
Asia Cup
Gold medal – first place	2009 Bangkok
Bronze medal – third place	2004 New Delhi
Asian Champions Trophy
Silver medal – second place	2011 Ordos

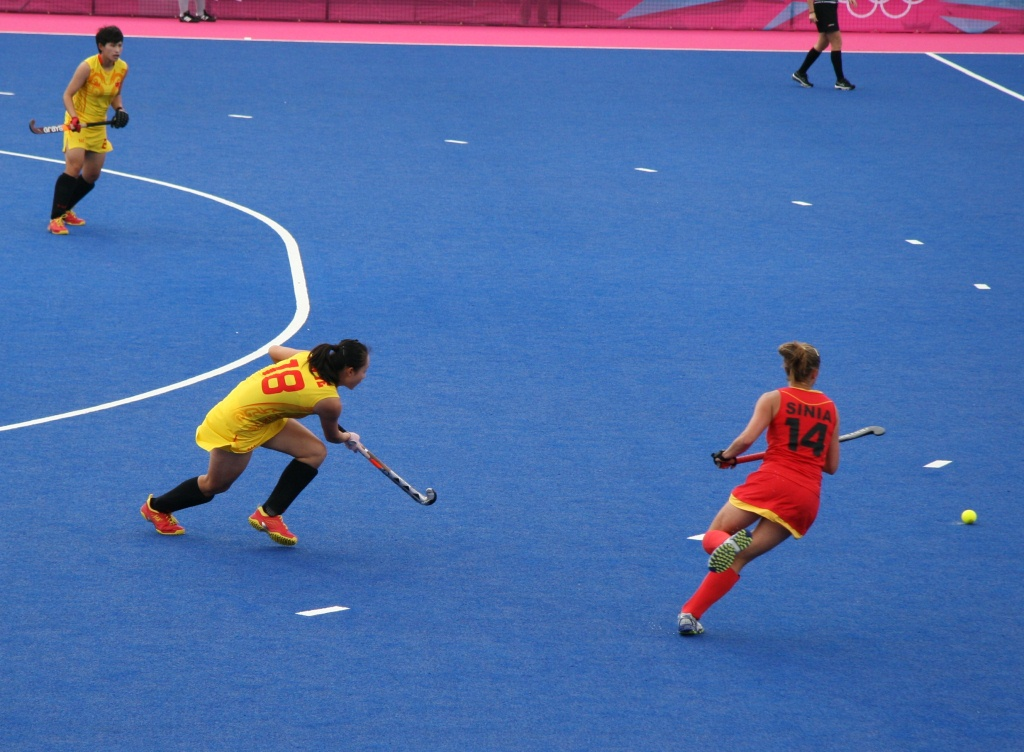
Ren Ye (18) during Belgium vs China (0-0) at Riverbank Arena - London 2012 Summer Olympics

Ren Ye (Chinese: 任烨; born July 13, 1986, in Fushun, Liaoning) is a field hockey player from China, who won a silver medal with the national women's hockey team at the 2008 Summer Olympics in Beijing and gold medal as the 2006 and 2010 Asian Games women's field hockey champions.
