= Madonna Blyth =

Australian field hockey player

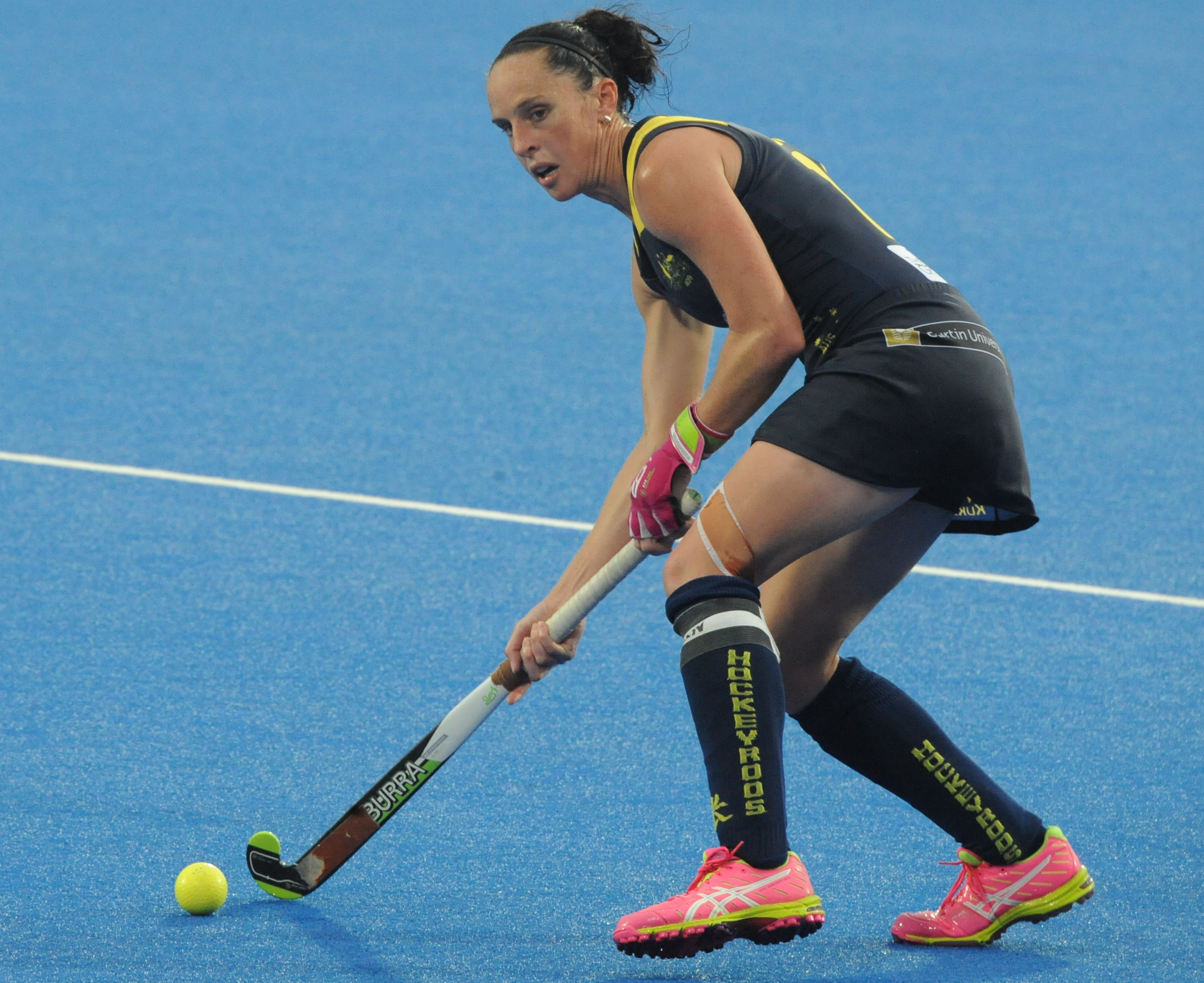

Personal information
- Born: 30 November 1985 (age 40) Brisbane, Queensland
- Height: 1.64 m (5 ft 4 1/2 in)

Sport
- Sport: Field hockey
- Position: Midfielder
- Club: Queensland Scorchers
National team
Years	Team	Caps	Goals
2004–2016	Australia	342	(70)
Medal record
Women's field hockey
Representing Australia
World Cup
Silver medal – second place	2006 Madrid	Team
Silver medal – second place	2014 The Hague	Team
Commonwealth Games
Gold medal – first place	2006 Melbourne	Team
Gold medal – first place	2010 New Delhi	Team
Gold medal – first place	2014 Glasgow	Team
Champions Trophy
Silver medal – second place	2005 Canberra	Team
Silver medal – second place	2009 Sydney	Team
World League
Silver medal – second place	2012-13 Tucuman	Team
Oceania Cup
Gold medal – first place	2005 Auckland, Sydney	Team
Gold medal – first place	2013 Stratford	Team
Gold medal – first place	2015 Stratford	Team
Silver medal – second place	2007 Buderim	Team
Silver medal – second place	2009 Invercargill	Team
Silver medal – second place	2011 Hobart	Team

Madonna Blyth (born 30 November 1985) is an Australian field hockey player who competed in the 2008, 2012 Summer Olympics and 2016 Summer Olympics. She also plays for and captains the Queensland Scorchers in the Australian Hockey League. Blyth has been the Captain of the Hockeyroos since 2009. Her debut game for Australia was in Argentina, as an 18-year-old at the 2004 Champions Trophy. She started playing hockey when she was 5, and joined the representative scene at 15, winning gold with her team at the 2001 Australian Youth Olympic Festival.

She was nominated for the FIH's player of the year in 2013, and has been named on the FIH All-Stars team in 2007, 2009 and 2010, as well as being named Player of the Tournament at the 2009 Champions Trophy.

She played her 250th game for Australia in June 2013, and is only the fifth Australian woman to reach this number.

At the 2014 Commonwealth Games, she captained Australia to victory and scored the winning goal in the penalty shootout against England.

After retiring from hockey, Blyth has become involved in the Western Australian cricket scene. After a strong start she was quickly promoted into the A grade side alongside Emma King, Heather Graham, Megan Banting and Nicole Bolton. She is a specialist fielder for the Subiaco Floreat Cricket Club women's A grade side.

== International goals ==
No.	Date	Venue	Opponent	Score	Result	Competition
1.	20 August 2005	Brisbane, Australia	South Korea	3–0	5–0	Test match
2.	3 November 2005	Sydney, Australia	New Zealand	1–0	4–0	2005 Women's Oceania Cup
3.	1 December 2005	Canberra, Australia	Argentina	1–1	1–1	2005 Women's Hockey Champions Trophy
4.	4 December 2005	Canberra, Australia	Netherlands	1–0	3–1	2005 Women's Hockey Champions Trophy
5.	27 January 2005	Córdoba, Argentina	England	2–1	2–2	2006 Women's Four Nations Hockey Tournament
6.	17 March 2006	Melbourne, Australia	Malaysia	4–0	8–0	2006 Commonwealth Games
7.	19 March 2006	Melbourne, Australia	Nigeria	1–0	12–0	2006 Commonwealth Games
8.	1 July 2006	Marlow, United Kingdom	Argentina	3–1	5–1	Test match
9.	15 July 2006	Amsterdam, Netherlands	Germany	2–0	2–1	2006 Women's Hockey Champions Trophy
10.	17 August 2006	Baltimore, United States	Argentina	1–1	1–2	2006 March on Madrid Hockey Tournament
11.	24 August 2006	Virginia Beach, United States	Netherlands	2–0	3–0	2006 March on Madrid Hockey Tournament
12.	27 September 2006	Madrid, Spain	South Africa	1–0	1–0	2006 Women's Hockey World Cup
13.	14 January 2007	Quilmes, Argentina	Germany	1–1	2–1	2007 Women's Hockey Champions Trophy
14.	15 May 2007	Christchurch, New Zealand	New Zealand	1–0	3–0	Test match
15.	15 May 2007	Christchurch, New Zealand	New Zealand	2–0	3–0	Test match
16.	22 July 2007	Port Lincoln, Australia	Japan	1–0	1–0	Test match
17.	4 August 2007	Beijing, China	China	1–1	3–2	Test match
18.	13 August 2007	Beijing, China	China	1–0	2–2 (3–1 p)	2007 Women's Good Luck Beijing Hockey Tournament
19.	11 September 2007	Buderim, Australia	Fiji	2–0	14–0	2007 Women's Oceania Cup
20.	11 September 2007	Buderim, Australia	Fiji	5–0	14–0	2007 Women's Oceania Cup
21.	11 September 2007	Buderim, Australia	Fiji	6–0	14–0	2007 Women's Oceania Cup
22.	11 September 2007	Buderim, Australia	Fiji	10–0	14–0	2007 Women's Oceania Cup
23.	12 September 2007	Buderim, Australia	New Zealand	1–0	1–0	2007 Women's Oceania Cup
24.	27 October 2007	Dublin, Ireland	Ireland	3–0	5–0	Test match
25.	14 February 2008	Perth, Australia	Great Britain	4–0	5–0	Test match
26.	23 February 2008	Toowoomba, Australia	Great Britain	2–0	5–2	Test match
27.	22 August 2008	Beijing, China	Great Britain	1–0	2–0	2008 Summer Olympics
28.	30 May 2009	Durban, South Africa	South Africa	4–0	5–0	Test match
29.	31 May 2009	Durban, South Africa	India	2–0	7–0	Test match
30.	6 July 2009	Perth, Australia	Germany	2–1	2–2	Test match
31.	11 July 2009	Sydney, Australia	Germany	2–0	2–0	2009 Women's Hockey Champions Trophy
32.	25 August 2009	Invercargill, New Zealand	Samoa	8–0	16–0	2009 Women's Oceania Cup
33.	25 August 2009	Invercargill, New Zealand	Samoa	16–0	16–0	2009 Women's Oceania Cup
34.	10 September 2009	Mendoza, Argentina	Argentina	1–0	1–0	Test match
35.	11 September 2009	Mendoza, Argentina	Argentina	2–2	3–2	Test match
36.	14 February 2010	Perth, Australia	New Zealand	1–2	3–2	Test match
37.	2 March 2010	Perth, Australia	South Korea	3–1	5–3	Test match
38.	24 March 2010	Townsville, Australia	Argentina	1–0	1–2	Test match
39.	24 April 2010	Santiago, Chile	Chile	4–0	5–0	2010 Women's Hockey World Cup Qualifiers
40.	29 April 2010	Santiago, Chile	Malaysia	2–0	9–0	2010 Women's Hockey World Cup Qualifiers
41.	29 April 2010	Santiago, Chile	Malaysia	3–0	9–0	2010 Women's Hockey World Cup Qualifiers
42.	29 April 2010	Santiago, Chile	Malaysia	9–0	9–0	2010 Women's Hockey World Cup Qualifiers
43.	30 April 2010	Santiago, Chile	Scotland	2–0	2–1	2010 Women's Hockey World Cup Qualifiers
44.	18 June 2010	Bisham, United Kingdom	Great Britain	1–?	1–1	Test match
45.	26 June 2010	Essen, Germany	India	6–2	6–2	Test match
46.	30 August 2010	Rosario, Argentina	Japan	2–0	2–1	2010 Women's Hockey World Cup
47.	1 September 2010	Rosario, Argentina	India	1–0	6–3	2010 Women's Hockey World Cup
48.	11 October 2010	New Delhi, India	England	1–0	1–0	2010 Commonwealth Games
49.	2 November 2011	Perth, Australia	China	2–0	8–1	Test match
50.	3 November 2011	Perth, Australia	China	1–0	6–4	Test match
51.	9 March 2012	Perth, Australia	South Korea	1–0	5–0	Test match
52.	29 September 2012	Dublin, Ireland	Belgium	4–1	4–1	2012 Women's Hockey Champions Challenge I
53.	30 September 2012	Dublin, Ireland	India	1–0	8–1	2012 Women's Hockey Champions Challenge I
54.	30 September 2012	Dublin, Ireland	India	5–1	8–1	2012 Women's Hockey Champions Challenge I
55.	24 April 2013	Perth, Australia	South Korea	3–1	4–2	Test match
56.	25 April 2013	Perth, Australia	South Korea	1–0	1–2	Test match
57.	27 April 2013	Perth, Australia	South Korea	4–0	6–0	Test match
58.	27 April 2013	Perth, Australia	South Korea	6–0	6–0	Test match
59.	17 October 2013	Perth, Australia	Malaysia	4–0	8–0	2013 Women's International Super Series Hockey 9's
60.	18 October 2013	Perth, Australia	Canada	2–0	7–0	2013 Women's International Super Series Hockey 9's
61.	18 October 2013	Perth, Australia	Canada	6–0	7–0	2013 Women's International Super Series Hockey 9's
62.	18 October 2013	Perth, Australia	Canada	7–0	7–0	2013 Women's International Super Series Hockey 9's
63.	20 October 2013	Perth, Australia	Argentina	1–0	3–0	2013 Women's International Super Series Hockey 9's
64.	31 October 2013	Stratford, New Zealand	Samoa	6–0	23–0	2013 Women's Oceania Cup
65.	31 October 2013	Stratford, New Zealand	Samoa	11–0	23–0	2013 Women's Oceania Cup
66.	3 November 2013	Stratford, New Zealand	New Zealand	2–2	2–2 (5–4 p)	2013 Women's Oceania Cup
67.	28 March 2014	Perth, Australia	Japan	3–0	5–2	Test match
68.	12 April 2015	Hastings, New Zealand	China	1–0	2–2	2015 Hawke's Bay Cup
69.	18 April 2015	Hastings, New Zealand	China	1–0	3–2	2015 Hawke's Bay Cup
70.	21 June 2015	Antwerp, Belgium	Poland	9–0	9–0	2014–15 Women's FIH Hockey World League Semifinals
71.	22 October 2015	Stratford, New Zealand	Samoa	13–0	25–0	2015 Women's Oceania Cup
