= Kim Jung-hee =

South Korean hockey player

Personal information
- Nationality: South Korean
- Born: 7 May 1983 (age 42)

Sport
- Sport: Field hockey

Kim Jung-hee (born 7 May 1983) is a South Korean field hockey player. She competed in the women's tournament at the 2008 Summer Olympics, where the team placed ninth.
