= Vidette Ryan =

South African field hockey player (born 1984)

Vidette Ryan (born 20 May 1984) is a South African field hockey player who competed in the 2008 Summer Olympics. Their twin sibling is Jackson Vida Ryan.
