= Amy Kickbusch =

Australian field hockey player

Amy Korner
Personal information
- Born: 23 April 1986 (age 40) Ipswich, Queensland

Sport
- Sport: Field hockey
- Position: Midfielder
National team
| Years | Team | Caps | Goals |
| 2005–2011 | Australia | 47 | (10) |
Medal record
Women's field hockey
Representing Australia
Champions Trophy
| Silver medal – second place | 2005 Canberra | Team |

Amy Kickbusch (née Korner) (born 23 April 1986) is a former Australian field hockey player.
