= Megan Rivers =

Australian field hockey player

Megan Rivers (born 10 October 1980) is an Australian field hockey player who competed in the 2008 Summer Olympics and 2012 Summer Olympics. Her nicknames are Snowy and Nanny Rivs. Megan's club is the NSW Arrows in Sydney, NSW, Australia. She plays right hand and is a midfielder. Her coach is Adam Commens. She was born in Bowral, New South Wales.
