= Kate Hollywood =

Australian field hockey player

Personal information
- Born: 28 May 1986 (age 40) Gymea Bay, New South Wales

Sport
- Sport: Field hockey
- Position: Midfielder, defender
Senior career
Years	Team	Caps	Goals
2005–2012	NSW Arrows	-	-
National team
Years	Team	Caps	Goals
2005–2011	Australia	142	(27)
Medal record
Women's field hockey
Representing Australia
Champions Trophy
Silver medal – second place	2005 Canberra	Team
Silver medal – second place	2009 Sydney	Team
Commonwealth Games
Gold medal – first place	2006 Melbourne	Team
Gold medal – first place	2010 Delhi	Team

Kate Hollywood (born 28 May 1986) is an Australian former field hockey player who represented the Australian national team at the 2008 Beijing Olympics and won two Commonwealth Games gold medals, in 2006 and 2010. Domestically, Hollywood played for the New South Wales Arrows in the Australian Hockey League (AHL). Known for her "speed, vision, and accuracy in passing", Hollywood played predominantly in midfield and was a member of the national team from 2005 to 2011, earning over 150 international caps.

== Early life ==
Born to Carolyn and Bob Hollywood on 28 May 1986, Hollywood is originally from Gymea Bay, New South Wales. From a hockey-playing family – her father played first-grade hockey in Sydney – she began playing hockey at four years of age for her local team, Sutherland Hockey Club.

== Career ==
After her debut season with the New South Wales Arrows in the Australian Hockey League (AHL) in 2005, Hollywood was selected to play for the Australian team for their 2005 tour of the United States. Hollywood made her international debut on that tour as a 19-year-old and, after an impressive showing, she became a constant fixture in the Australian team. In July, Hollywood was selected to play for the Australian under-21 team at the Junior World Cup. Several months after her senior debut, Hollywood played at the 2005 Women's Hockey Champions Trophy where she won a silver medal, losing the final in a penalty shootout to the Netherlands.

The next year, Hollywood played for Australia at the 2006 Commonwealth Games. Australia won the gold medal, defeating India 1–0 in the final, which Hollywood described as the "highlight of her career" and her "greatest moment". Hollywood also played at the 2006 Women's Hockey Champions Trophy, but the Australians could not repeat their performance of the previous year and did not feature in the medals. Despite being a regular in the Australian team for the majority of the year, Hollywood was not selected to the Australian squad for the 2006 World Cup.

The 2007 season saw Hollywood suffer her first major injury setback, as she was sidelined for four months to recover from surgery due to compartment syndrome. Hollywood made her way back into the Australian team in time for the 2007 Women's Hockey Champions Trophy where Australia lost the third place playoff to Germany.

Prior to the 2008 Olympics, Hollywood competed at the 2008 Women's Hockey Champions Trophy where Australia finished a distant fifth. Hollywood then proceeded to complete a "childhood dream" by playing at her first Olympic Games. Although there was speculation in the lead-up that Australia was a gold medal contender, the Australians finished third in their group and did not progress to the semi-finals. Australia ended up finishing a disappointing fifth overall.

The next year Hollywood, who had become one of the national team's senior players due to multiple retirements after the Olympics, played at the 2009 Women's Hockey Champions Trophy. Hollywood played her 100th international match at the tournament, as the Australians won the silver medal, losing to Argentina in a penalty shootout in the final.

Australia failed to qualify for the Champions Trophy in 2010, so the first major tournament that Hollywood was scheduled to play was the World Cup. After breaking her hand in June, Hollywood raced to become fit in time for the World Cup, which began in late August. Hollywood did recover in time and, in what was becoming a pattern for the Australian team at major tournaments, they again finished fifth after failing to make the semi-finals. Hollywood played at her second Commonwealth Games later in the year, where she was one of only five players who had also represented Australia at the previous Games. She scored one goal for the tournament as the Australians won the gold medal—Hollywood's second Commonwealth Games gold—winning the final against New Zealand in a penalty shootout.

Despite winning the Commonwealth Games in 2010, the Australian team fell to fifth in the world rankings. As a result, a new coach, Adam Commens, was appointed. He began his time in charge of the Hockeyroos by dropping five experienced players, Hollywood included, from the Australian national squad, citing an "emphasis on youth". Hollywood was subsequently moved to the development squad to "develop on areas [she] needs to work on", with Commens declaring that it was not the end of Hollywood's career. As she had changed from a midfielder to a defender in the Australian off-season, Hollywood said that it "wasn't a major shock", but that she had enjoyed the move and was determined to win her way back into the Australian side for the 2012 Olympics. During the year, Hollywood finished her bachelor's degree in physical education; played professionally for Dutch side, Rotterdam; and also played domestically in New Zealand. In October, Hollywood was rewarded with a call-up to the national team for a series against China. Commens said that she had "done well for Australia A during various matches throughout the year" and that "with some strong performances in this series against China she could challenge for a spot in the [Olympic] squad". Despite playing well in the series against China, including scoring a goal from a penalty corner, Hollywood was left out of the 27-person Australian training squad for the 2012 Olympics.

Hollywood played another season in the Netherlands for Rotterdam and again followed that up with a stint playing professionally in New Zealand for Auckland Fury, returning home to Australia in September 2012. She then decided to take a break from playing hockey and started doing some junior coaching. Hollywood subsequently started work as a physical education teacher in Sydney. She is also an ambassador for Autism Spectrum Australia. In July 2013, Hollywood stated that she was unsure if she would return to hockey.
