= Claire Messent =

Australian field hockey player

Personal information
- Born: 25 July 1985 (age 41) Melbourne, Victoria

Sport
- Sport: Field hockey
- Position: Attacker
- Club: Victorian Vipers
National team
| Years | Team | Caps | Goals |
| 2006–2015 | Australia | 73 | (20) |
Medal record
Women's field hockey
Representing Australia
Hockey World League
| Silver medal – second place | 2013 Tucumán | Team |
Oceania Cup
| Gold medal – first place | 2013 Stratford | Team |
| Silver medal – second place | 2009 Invercargill | Team |
| Silver medal – second place | 2011 Hobart | Team |

Claire Messent (born 25 July 1985) is a former Australian field hockey player.

== Career ==
Messent was born in Melbourne, Victoria, and made her senior international debut in a test match against Argentina in August 2006.
