= Sylvia Karres =

Dutch field hockey player

Personal information
- Born: 8 November 1976 (age 49) Leiderdorp, Netherlands
Medal record
Women's field hockey
Representing the Netherlands
Olympic Games
Silver medal – second place	2004 Athens	Team competition
Champions Trophy
Gold medal – first place	2005 Canberra	Team competition
Bronze medal – third place	2003 Sydney	Team competition
Bronze medal – third place	2006 Amstelveen	Team competition

Sylvia Jeanne Alice Karres (born 8 November 1976 in Leiderdorp) is a retired Dutch field hockey player who played as an attacker for Dutch club Amsterdam and the Netherlands national team.

Karres was a member of the Dutch squad that won the silver medal at the 2004 Summer Olympics in Athens. She was also part of the Dutch squad that became world champions at the 2006 Women's Hockey World Cup, where she was the top goal scorer of the tournament with 6 goals.
