= Hope Munro =

Australian field hockey player (born 1981)

Personal information
- Born: Hope Brown; 14 June 1981 (age 45) Toowoomba, Queensland
- Height: 160 cm (5 ft 3 in)
- Weight: 57 kg (126 lb)

Sport
- Club: Curtin University Hockey Club
Medal record
Women's field hockey
Representing Australia
World Cup
Silver medal – second place	2006 Madrid	Team competition

Hope Munro (née Brown; born 14 June 1981) is an Australian field hockey midfielder who played for the Australian women's national team, the Hockeyroos at the 2008 Summer Olympics in Beijing and 2012 Summer Olympics in London. Munro lives in Perth, Western Australia with her husband and children. Her younger brother Kiel Brown plays for the Australian men's team, the Kookaburras.
