= Rebecca Sanders =

Australian field hockey player (born 1982)

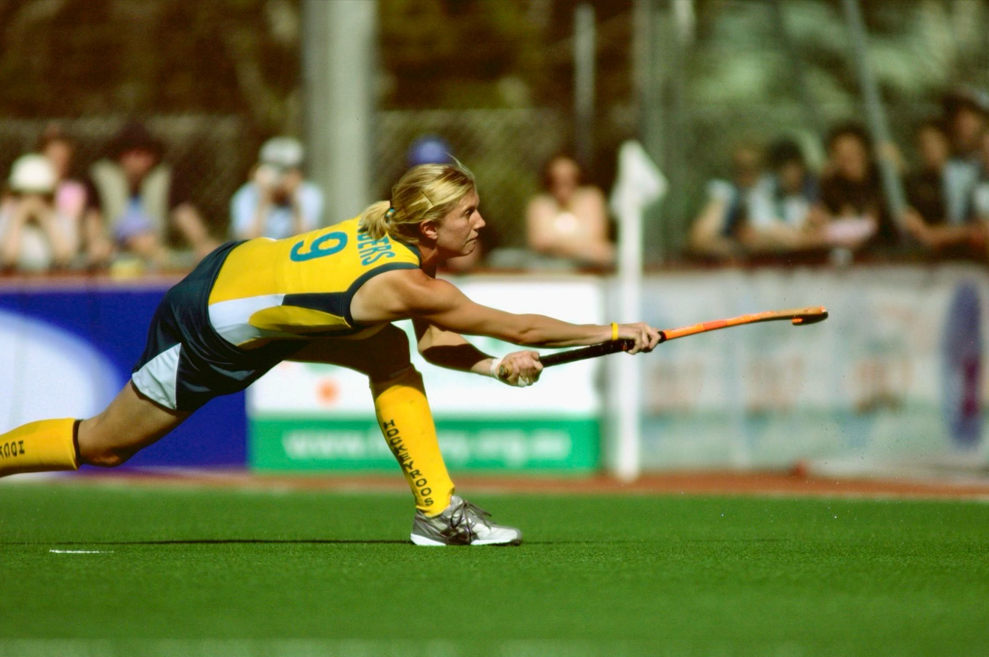
- Rebecca Sanders at the 2005 Champions Trophy

Personal information
- Born: 9 July 1982 (age 43) Liverpool, New South Wales, Australia

Sport
- Sport: Field hockey
Medal record
Women's field hockey
Representing Australia
Commonwealth Games
Gold medal – first place	2006 Melbourne	Team

Rebecca Sanders (born 9 July 1982) is an Australian former field hockey player who represented the Hockeyroos a total of 106 times with 17 goals.

== Club level ==
Rebecca started playing hockey at around 7 years of age for Raby Hockey Club within Campbelltown City Women's Hockey Association

== Australian Hockey League ==
Rebecca was part of the NSW Arrows Hockey Team from 2001 to 2009 and won the Women's Australian Hockey League Player of the tournament in 2007.

She was part of the gold medal-winning NSW Arrows team in 2009 beating the Qld Scorchers 5–3 in the final scoring a total of 7 goals during this tournament to be the second highest goal scorer.

== International hockey ==
Rebecca competed in a number of major international tournaments including:

- 2001 FIH Junior World Cup (3rd place)
- 2004 Champions Trophy (4th place)
- 2005 Champions Trophy (2nd place)
- 2006 Champions Trophy (5th place)
- 2006 FIH World Cup (2nd place)
- 2006 Commonwealth Games Melbourne (Gold medal)
- 2007 Champions Trophy (4th place)
- 2008 Champions Trophy (5th place)

== Administration ==
Rebecca was elected to the NSW Hockey Board of Directors on 27 November 2010 and held this position until 2016.
