= 2014–15 Women's FIH Hockey World League Semifinals =

Field hockey tournament

Tournament details
- Dates: 10 June – 5 July 2015
- Teams: 20 (from 5 confederations)
- Venue: 2 (in 2 host cities)

Tournament statistics
- Matches played: 66
- Goals scored: 259 (3.92 per match)
- Top scorer: (Australia) Jodie Kenny (10 goals)

The 2014–15 Women's FIH Hockey World League Semifinals took place in June and July 2015. A total of 20 teams competed in 2 events in this round of the tournament playing for 7 berths in the Final, played between 21 and 29 November 2015 in Rosario, Argentina.

This round also served as a qualifier for the 2016 Summer Olympics as the 7 highest placed teams apart from the five continental champions qualified.

== Qualification ==
11 teams ranked between 1st and 11th in the FIH World Rankings current at the time of seeking entries for the competition qualified automatically, in addition to 7 teams qualified from Round 2 and two nations that did not meet ranking criteria and were exempt from Round 2 to host a Semifinal. The following twenty teams, shown with final pre-tournament rankings, competed in this round of the tournament.

Dates	Event	Location	Quotas	Qualifier(s)
	Ranked 1st to 11th in the FIH World Rankings		11	Netherlands (1); Argentina (3); New Zealand (4); Great Britain (8); Germany (6); Australia (2); China (7); South Korea (9); Japan (10); United States (5); South Africa (11)
	Host nation		2	Belgium (12); Spain (15)
14–22 February 2015	2014–15 FIH Hockey World League Round 2	Montevideo, Uruguay	3	Italy (16); Uruguay (29); ~~Azerbaijan (19)~~; France (30)
7–15 March 2015	2014–15 FIH Hockey World League Round 2	New Delhi, India	2	India (13); Poland (23)
14–22 March 2015	2014–15 FIH Hockey World League Round 2	Dublin, Ireland	2	Ireland (14); Canada (20)
Total			20	

== Valencia ==

Tournament details
- Host country: Spain
- City: Valencia
- Dates: 10–21 June 2015
- Teams: 10
- Venue: Polideportivo Virgen del Carmen Beteró

Final positions
- Champions: Great Britain
- Runner-up: China
- Third place: Germany

Tournament statistics
- Matches played: 33
- Goals scored: 105 (3.18 per match)
- Top scorer(s): (Argentina) Carla Rebecchi (United Kingdom) Sophie Bray (5 goals)
- Best player: (Spain) Georgina Oliva

All times are Central European Summer Time (UTC+02:00)

=== Umpires ===
Below are the 10 umpires appointed by the International Hockey Federation:

- Amy Baxter (USA)
- Karen Bennett (NZL)
- Caroline Brunekreef (NED)
- Elena Eskina (RUS)
- Kelly Hudson (NZL)
- Mariana Reydo (ARG)
- Hannah Sanders (GBR)
- Kylie Seymour (AUS)
- Chieko Soma (JPN)
- Emi Yamada (JPN)

=== First round ===
==== Pool A ====
Pos	Team	Pld	W	D	L	GF	GA	GD	Pts	Qualification
1	Great Britain	4	4	0	0	10	2	+8	12	Advance to quarterfinals
2	Argentina	4	2	1	1	11	4	+7	7	Advance to quarterfinals
3	Spain	4	2	1	1	6	4	+2	7	Advance to quarterfinals
4	China	4	1	0	3	3	6	−3	3	Advance to quarterfinals
5	Canada	4	0	0	4	2	16	−14	0	

Source: FIH.ch
Rules for classification: 1) points; 2) goal difference; 3) goals scored; 4) head-to-head result.

10 June 2015
17:00

China	3–0	Canada
Ma 17'; Peng 38'; De 51'	Report

Umpires:
Hannah Sanders (ENG)
Caroline Brunekreef (NED)

10 June 2015
19:00

Great Britain	2–0	Spain
Danson 49'; Leigh 50'	Report

Umpires:
Kelly Hudson (NZL)
Kylie Seymour (AUS)

11 June 2015
17:00

Argentina	6–0	Canada
F. Habif 11'; Albertario 14', 25', 42'; Barrionuevo 24'; Rebecchi 36'	Report

Umpires:
Elena Eskina (RUS)
Amy Baxter (USA)

11 June 2015
19:00

China	0–1	Spain
	Report	Riera 10'

Umpires:
Chieko Soma (JPN)
Mariana Reydo (ARG)

13 June 2015
17:00

Great Britain	2–0	Argentina
Macleod 37'; Bray 58'	Report

Umpires:
Kelly Hudson (NZL)
Karen Bennett (NZL)

13 June 2015
19:00

Spain	3–0	Canada
Ybarra 33'; Riera 49'; Gómez 55'	Report

Umpires:
Kylie Seymour (AUS)
Caroline Brunekreef (NED)

14 June 2015
17:00

Canada	2–4	Great Britain
Norlander 20'; Stairs 60'	Report	Danson 8'; Twigg 24'; Bray 35', 54'

Umpires:
Emi Yamada (JPN)
Karen Bennett (NZL)

14 June 2015
19:00

China	0–3	Argentina
	Report	Sánchez Moccia 3'; Merino 20'; F. Habif 21'

Umpires:
Caroline Brunekreef (NED)
Amy Baxter (USA)

16 June 2015
13:00

Great Britain	2–0	China
Bray 5', 57'	Report

Umpires:
Mariana Reydo (ARG)
Kylie Seymour (AUS)

16 June 2015
19:00

Argentina	2–2	Spain
Rodríguez 30'; Gomes Fantasia 53'	Report	Guinea 5'; Petchame 59'

Umpires:
Chieko Soma (JPN)
Kelly Hudson (NZL)

==== Pool B ====
Pos	Team	Pld	W	D	L	GF	GA	GD	Pts	Qualification
1	Ireland	4	3	0	1	10	6	+4	9	Advance to quarterfinals
2	Germany	4	2	2	0	12	2	+10	8	Advance to quarterfinals
3	United States	4	2	1	1	8	5	+3	7	Advance to quarterfinals
4	South Africa	4	0	2	2	3	9	−6	2	Advance to quarterfinals
5	Uruguay	4	0	1	3	3	14	−11	1	

Source: FIH.ch
Rules for classification: 1) points; 2) goal difference; 3) goals scored; 4) head-to-head result.

10 June 2015
13:00

South Africa	1–4	Ireland
Madsen 9'	Report	Evans 5', 18', 50'; Daly 55'

Umpires:
Mariana Reydo (ARG)
Amy Baxter (USA)

10 June 2015
15:00

Germany	8–0	Uruguay
Hoffmann 5'; Lorenz 9'; Stapenhorst 11', 37'; Haase 35', 60'; Krüger 36', 42'	Report

Umpires:
Chieko Soma (JPN)
Elena Eskina (RUS)

11 June 2015
13:00

United States	2–0	Uruguay
Dawson 25'; Sharkey 60'	Report

Umpires:
Emi Yamada (JPN)
Karen Bennett (NZL)

11 June 2015
15:00

Germany	3–1	Ireland
Schröder 32'; Mävers 37'; Haase 60'	Report	O'Flanagan 48'

Umpires:
Kylie Seymour (AUS)
Hannah Sanders (ENG)

13 June 2015
13:00

Ireland	3–2	Uruguay
O'Flanagan 26'; Evans 36'; Connery 57'	Report	Stanley 41'; Vilar del Valle 44'

Umpires:
Elena Eskina (RUS)
Amy Baxter (USA)

13 June 2015
15:00

South Africa	1–4	United States
Chamberlain 7'	Report	Crandall 29'; Falgowski 33'; Sharkey 49'; Witmer 59'

Umpires:
Hannah Sanders (ENG)
Emi Yamada (JPN)

14 June 2015
13:00

Uruguay	1–1	South Africa
Vilar del Valle 58'	Report	Evans 38'

Umpires:
Kelly Hudson (NZL)
Chieko Soma (JPN)

14 June 2015
15:00

Germany	2–2	United States
Altenburg 39'; Krüger 40'	Report	Reinprecht 11', 48'

Umpires:
Mariana Reydo (ARG)
Elena Eskina (RUS)

16 June 2015
15:00

United States	0–2	Ireland
	Report	Frazer 29'; O'Flanagan 60'

Umpires:
Caroline Brunekreef (NED)
Karen Bennett (NZL)

16 June 2015
17:00

South Africa	0–0	Germany
	Report

Umpires:
Hannah Sanders (ENG)
Emi Yamada (JPN)

=== Second round ===
Quarter-finals
18 June 2015
Great Britain	2
South Africa	0
18 June 2015
Germany (p.s.o)	1 (3)
Spain	1 (2)
18 June 2015
Argentina	3
United States	0
18 June 2015
Ireland	1 (3)
China (p.s.o)	1 (4)

Semi-finals
20 June 2015
Great Britain	1
Germany	0
20 June 2015
Argentina	1
China	2

Final
21 June 2015
Great Britain	2
China	0
Third place
21 June 2015
Germany (p.s.o)	1 (3)
Argentina	1 (1)

==== Quarter-finals ====
18 June 2015
11:30

Ireland	1–1	China
Watkins 42'	Report	Zhang 5'
Penalties
Frazer (penalty shoot-out scored); Smyth (penalty shoot-out missed); O'Flanagan (penalty shoot-out scored); Connery (penalty shoot-out scored); Evans (penalty shoot-out missed) —— Frazer (penalty shoot-out missed); O'Flanagan (penalty shoot-out missed)	3–4	(penalty shoot-out missed) De; (penalty shoot-out scored) Liang; (penalty shoot-out scored) Peng; (penalty shoot-out scored) Li J. (penalty shoot-out missed) Yu —— (penalty shoot-out missed) Peng; (penalty shoot-out scored) Liang

Umpires:
Kelly Hudson (NZL)
Elena Eskina (RUS)

18 June 2015
14:00

Argentina	3–0	United States
Rebecchi 16', 29'; Barrionuevo 44'	Report

Umpires:
Kylie Seymour (AUS)
Karen Bennett (NZL)

18 June 2015
16:30

Great Britain	2–0	South Africa
Danson 12'; K. Richardson-Walsh 14'	Report

Umpires:
Chieko Soma (JPN)
Caroline Brunekreef (NED)

18 June 2015
19:00

Germany	1–1	Spain
Hoffmann 51'	Report	Riera 42'
Penalties
Stapenhorst (penalty shoot-out missed); Altenburg (penalty shoot-out missed); Mävers (penalty shoot-out missed); Teschke (penalty shoot-out scored); Hauke (penalty shoot-out scored) —— Hauke (penalty shoot-out scored)	3–2	(penalty shoot-out scored) Oliva; (penalty shoot-out missed) Magaz; (penalty shoot-out scored) Pérez; (penalty shoot-out missed) Tost; (penalty shoot-out missed) Riera —— (penalty shoot-out missed) Oliva

Umpires:
Mariana Reydo (ARG)
Amy Baxter (USA)

==== Ninth and tenth place ====
19 June 2015
19:00

Canada	2–0	Uruguay
Watson 24'; Hennig 29'	Report

Umpires:
Ayanna McClean (TRI)
Hannah Sanders (ENG)

==== Fifth to eighth place classification ====
Crossover
20 June 2015
South Africa	0
Spain	2
20 June 2015
United States	6
Ireland	1

Fifth place match
21 June 2015
Spain	1
United States	3
Seventh place match
21 June 2015
South Africa	4
Ireland	0

===== Crossover =====
20 June 2015
11:30

United States	6–1	Ireland
Crandall 8', 9'; O'Donnell 35', 41'; Selenski 47'; Witmer 58'	Report	O'Flanagan 43'

Umpires:
Hannah Sanders (ENG)
Mariana Reydo (ARG)

20 June 2015
14:00

South Africa	0–2	Spain
	Report	Magaz 4'; Riera 12'

Umpires:
Emi Yamada (JPN)
Amy Baxter (USA)

===== Seventh and eighth place =====
21 June 2015
11:30

South Africa	4–0	Ireland
Manuel 14'; Deetlefs 44'; Du Plessis 52'; Madsen 55'	Report

Umpires:
Hannah Sanders (ENG)
Karen Bennett (NZL)

===== Fifth and sixth place =====
21 June 2015
14:00

Spain	1–3	United States
Pérez 15'	Report	K. Reinprecht 17'; Sharkey 40'; Vittese 56'

Umpires:
Kylie Seymour (AUS)
Caroline Brunekreef (NED)

==== First to fourth place classification ====
===== Semifinals =====
20 June 2015
16:30

Argentina	1–2	China
Rebecchi 24'	Report	Wang M. 25', 56'

Umpires:
Chieko Soma (JPN)
Elena Eskina (RUS)

20 June 2015
19:00

Great Britain	1–0	Germany
Owsley 7'	Report

Umpires:
Kylie Seymour (AUS)
Kelly Hudson (NZL)

===== Third and fourth place =====
21 June 2015
16:30

Germany	1–1	Argentina
Korth 58'	Report	Rebecchi 16'
Penalties
Hillmann (penalty shoot-out missed); Mävers (penalty shoot-out scored); Altenburg (penalty shoot-out scored); Teschke (penalty shoot-out scored)	3–1	(penalty shoot-out missed) Gomes Fantasia; (penalty shoot-out missed) Merino; (penalty shoot-out missed) Sánchez Moccia; (penalty shoot-out scored) Albertario

Umpires:
Kelly Hudson (NZL)
Elena Eskina (RUS)

===== Final =====
21 June 2015
19:00

Great Britain	2–0	China
Webb 25'; Danson 35'	Report

Umpires:
Mariana Reydo (ARG)
Amy Baxter (USA)

=== Awards ===
Top Goalscorers	Player of the Tournament	Goalkeeper of the Tournament	Young Player of the Tournament
(Argentina) Carla Rebecchi (United Kingdom) Sophie Bray	(Spain) Georgina Oliva	(United Kingdom) Maddie Hinch	(Germany) Charlotte Stapenhorst

== Antwerp ==

Tournament details
- Host country: Belgium
- City: Antwerp
- Dates: 20 June–5 July 2015
- Teams: 10
- Venue: KHC Dragons

Final positions
- Champions: Netherlands
- Runner-up: South Korea
- Third place: Australia

Tournament statistics
- Matches played: 33
- Goals scored: 154 (4.67 per match)
- Top scorer: (Australia) Jodie Kenny (10 goals)
- Best player: (Netherlands) Lidewij Welten

All times are Central European Summer Time (UTC+02:00)

=== Umpires ===
Below are the 10 umpires appointed by the International Hockey Federation:

- Claire Adenot (FRA)
- Chen Hong (CHN)
- Amber Church (NZL)
- Carolina de la Fuente (ARG)
- Laurine Delforge (BEL)
- Kang Hyun-young (KOR)
- Irene Presenqui (ARG)
- Annelize Rostron (RSA)
- Melissa Trivic (AUS)
- Sarah Wilson (GBR)

=== First round ===
==== Pool A ====
Azerbaijan was supposed to take part but France took their place.

Pos	Team	Pld	W	D	L	GF	GA	GD	Pts	Qualification
1	Netherlands	4	4	0	0	26	1	+25	12	Advance to quarterfinals
2	South Korea	4	2	1	1	14	3	+11	7	Advance to quarterfinals
3	Italy	4	1	2	1	7	12	−5	5	Advance to quarterfinals
4	Japan	4	1	1	2	8	8	0	4	Advance to quarterfinals
5	France	4	0	0	4	1	32	−31	0	

Source: FIH
Rules for classification: 1) points; 2) goal difference; 3) goals scored; 4) head-to-head result.

20 June 2015
12:00

South Korea	1–1	Italy
Park M. 11'	Report	Ruggieri 58'

Umpires:
Amber Church (NZL)
Liu Xiaoying (CHN)

20 June 2015
14:00

Netherlands	11–0	France
Verschoor 9'; Paumen 11', 49', 60'; Jonker 13', 31'; Van Maasakker 18'; Welten 22', 25', 56'; Hoog 44'	Report

Umpires:
Chen Hong (CHN)
Carolina de la Fuente (ARG)

21 June 2015
14:00

South Korea	1–2	Netherlands
Park S. 9'	Report	De Goede 5'; Verschoor 47'

Umpires:
Melissa Trivic (AUS)
Annelize Rostron (RSA)

21 June 2015
20:00

France	1–6	Japan
Lecas 58'	Report	Y. Nagai 6'; Oikawa 11', 28', 43'; Shibata 14'; H. Nagai 45'

Umpires:
Sarah Wilson (SCO)
Liu Xiaoying (CHN)

23 June 2015
20:00

Japan	0–4	Netherlands
	Report	Paumen 13', 47'; Van As 26'; De Waard 55'

Umpires:
Claire Adenot (FRA)
Annelize Rostron (RSA)

24 June 2015
12:00

Italy	4–0	France
Wybieralska 14', 47'; Casale 17'; Ruggieri 24'	Report

Umpires:
Chen Hong (CHN)
Irene Presenqui (ARG)

25 June 2015
10:00

South Korea	11–0	France
Cheon 5'; Park M. 12', 33'; Han 22', 42'; Kim J. 36', 51'; Oh 38', 54'; Baek 48'; Kim B. 57'	Report

Umpires:
Amber Church (NZL)
Chen Hong (CHN)

25 June 2015
12:00

Japan	2–2	Italy
Shibata 4'; Kato 15'	Report	Braconi 7', 29'

Umpires:
Melissa Trivic (AUS)
Kang Hyun-young (KOR)

27 June 2015
12:00

Japan	0–1	South Korea
	Report	Kim J. 17'

Umpires:
Amber Church (NZL)
Laurine Delforge (BEL)

27 June 2015
14:00

Netherlands	9–0	Italy
Paumen 3', 12', 40'; Van Maasakker 18'; Hoog 29'; Welten 37', 51'; Keetels 46'; Dirkse van den Heuvel 54'	Report

Umpires:
Claire Adenot (FRA)
Annelize Rostron (RSA)

==== Pool B ====
Pos	Team	Pld	W	D	L	GF	GA	GD	Pts	Qualification
1	New Zealand	4	4	0	0	21	0	+21	12	Advance to quarterfinals
2	Australia	4	3	0	1	15	4	+11	9	Advance to quarterfinals
3	Belgium	4	2	0	2	3	4	−1	6	Advance to quarterfinals
4	India	4	1	0	3	5	11	−6	3	Advance to quarterfinals
5	Poland	4	0	0	4	1	26	−25	0	

Source: FIH
Rules for classification: 1) points; 2) goal difference; 3) goals scored; 4) head-to-head result.

20 June 2015
10:00

New Zealand	12–0	Poland
Punt 8', 34'; Flynn 13', 15', 32', 47'; Keddell 15'; Merry 19', 48'; Webster 37'; Pearce 42'; Thompson 55'	Report

Umpires:
Sarah Wilson (SCO)
Irene Presenqui (ARG)

20 June 2015
16:00

Belgium	1–0	India
Van Lindt 35'	Report

Umpires:
Claire Adenot (FRA)
Annelize Rostron (RSA)

21 June 2015
10:00

Australia	9–0	Poland
Kenny 9', 22', 35', 44'; Parker 20'; Smith 25'; Slattery 42'; Nanscawen 54'; Blyth 57'	Report

Umpires:
Kang Hyun-young (KOR)
Laurine Delforge (BEL)

23 June 2015
14:00

New Zealand	5–0	India
Flynn 10', 40'; Merry 18'; Pearce 52', 56'	Report

Umpires:
Kang Hyun-young (KOR)
Carolina de la Fuente (ARG)

24 June 2015
16:00

India	3–1	Poland
R. Rani 20', 29'; Kataria 54'	Report	Wiśniewska 49'

Umpires:
Melissa Trivic (AUS)
Laurine Delforge (BEL)

24 June 2015
18:00

Belgium	0–2	Australia
	Report	Kenny 9'; McMahon 41'

Umpires:
Sarah Wilson (SCO)
Amber Church (NZL)

25 June 2015
18:00

Poland	0–2	Belgium
	Report	Sinia 24'; Simons 54'

Umpires:
Claire Adenot (FRA)
Carolina de la Fuente (ARG)

25 June 2015
20:00

Australia	0–2	New Zealand
	Report	Punt 33'; Gunson 54'

Umpires:
Irene Presenqui (ARG)
Laurine Delforge (BEL)

27 June 2015
16:00

Belgium	0–2	New Zealand
	Report	Punt 12'; Flynn 33'

Umpires:
Melissa Trivic (AUS)
Sarah Wilson (SCO)

27 June 2015
18:00

Australia	4–2	India
Kenny 2', 6', 33', 44'	Report	Kataria 5'; P. Rani 33'

Umpires:
Carolina de la Fuente (ARG)
Liu Xiaoying (CHN)

=== Second round ===
Quarter-finals
30 June 2015
Netherlands	7
India	0
30 June 2015
Australia	2
Italy	0
30 June 2015
South Korea (p.s.o)	2 (3)
Belgium	2 (0)
30 June 2015
New Zealand	5
Japan	1

Semi-finals
2 July 2015
Netherlands	5
Australia	1
2 July 2015
South Korea (p.s.o)	1 (4)
New Zealand	1 (2)

Final
4 July 2015
Netherlands	2
South Korea	1
Third place
4 July 2015
Australia	4
New Zealand	2

==== Quarter-finals ====
30 June 2015
13:00

Australia	2–0	Italy
Kenny 21'; Flanagan 40'	Report

Umpires:
Laurine Delforge (BEL)
Kang Hyun-young (KOR)

30 June 2015
15:30

New Zealand	5–1	Japan
Webster 5'; Cocks 34'; Punt 42'; Pearce 49'; Flynn 54'	Report	Kato 4'

Umpires:
Sarah Wilson (SCO)
Irene Presenqui (ARG)

30 June 2015
18:00

Netherlands	7–0	India
Van As 1'; Welten 9', 48'; Van Maasakker 16', 26', 53'; Zerbo 18'	Report

Umpires:
Annelize Rostron (RSA)
Liu Xiaoying (CHN)

30 June 2015
20:30

South Korea	2–2	Belgium
Park M. 4'; Cheon 60'	Report	Versavel 37'; Simons 45'
Penalties
Park M. (penalty shoot-out scored); Kim D. (penalty shoot-out missed); Park S. (penalty shoot-out scored); Han (penalty shoot-out scored)	3–0	(penalty shoot-out missed) Gerniers; (penalty shoot-out missed) Boon; (penalty shoot-out missed) Raes

Umpires:
Amber Church (NZL)
Melissa Trivic (AUS)

==== Ninth and tenth place ====
30 June 2015
10:30

France	1–5	Poland
Billore 35'	Report	Katerla 22', 46'; Sławińska 41'; Wiśniewska 51'; Marcinkowska 56'

Umpires:
Carolina de la Fuente (ARG)
Chen Hong (CHN)

==== Fifth to eighth place classification ====
Crossover
2 July 2015
India (p.s.o)	1 (5)
Italy	1 (4)
2 July 2015
Belgium	1 (2)
Japan (p.s.o)	1 (4)

Fifth place match
4 July 2015
India	1
Japan	0
Seventh place match
4 July 2015
Italy	2
Belgium	4

===== Crossover =====
2 July 2015
13:00

India	1–1	Italy
R. Rani 33'	Report	Pacella 9'
Penalties
Kaur (penalty shoot-out scored); Kataria (penalty shoot-out missed); Thokchom (penalty shoot-out scored); R. Rani (penalty shoot-out scored); Deepika (penalty shoot-out scored) —— R. Rani (penalty shoot-out scored)	5–4	(penalty shoot-out scored) Braconi; (penalty shoot-out missed) Mirabella; (penalty shoot-out scored) Casale; (penalty shoot-out scored) Ruggieri; (penalty shoot-out scored) Tiddi —— (penalty shoot-out missed) Ruggieri

Umpires:
Laurine Delforge (BEL)
Liu Xiaoying (CHN)

2 July 2015
15:30

Belgium	1–1	Japan
De Groof 22'	Report	Oikawa 18'
Penalties
Vanden Borre (penalty shoot-out missed); Van Lindt (penalty shoot-out scored); Gerniers (penalty shoot-out missed); Raes (penalty shoot-out scored)	2–4	(penalty shoot-out missed) Sakai; (penalty shoot-out scored) Yamamoto; (penalty shoot-out scored) Shibata; (penalty shoot-out scored) Nagai; (penalty shoot-out scored) Kato

Umpires:
Claire Adenot (FRA)
Kang Hyun-young (KOR)

===== Seventh and eighth place =====
4 July 2015
10:30

Italy	2–4	Belgium
Ronsisvalli 15'; Tiddi 41'	Report	Versavel 19', 48'; Vanden Borre 25'; Vandermeiren 52'

===== Fifth and sixth place =====
4 July 2015
13:00

India	1–0	Japan
R. Rani 13'	Report

Umpires:
Carolina de la Fuente (ARG)
Irene Presenqui (ARG)

==== First to fourth place classification ====
===== Semifinals =====
2 July 2015
18:00

Netherlands	5–1	Australia
Dirkse van den Heuvel 14'; Paumen 15'; Zerbo 20'; Welten 45'; Bos 53'	Report	Slattery 30'

Umpires:
Carolina de la Fuente (ARG)
Irene Presenqui (ARG)

2 July 2015
20:30

South Korea	1–1	New Zealand
Park M. 25'	Report	Flynn 27'
Penalties
Park M. (penalty shoot-out scored); Han (penalty shoot-out scored); Cheon (penalty shoot-out missed); Park S. (penalty shoot-out scored); Kim D. (penalty shoot-out scored)	4–2	(penalty shoot-out missed) King; (penalty shoot-out scored) Gunson; (penalty shoot-out scored) Charlton; (penalty shoot-out missed) Michelsen

Umpires:
Melissa Trivic (AUS)
Sarah Wilson (GBR)

===== Third and fourth place =====
4 July 2015
15:30

Australia	4–2	New Zealand
Smith 3'; Claxton 4'; Williams 15'; Nanscawen 45'	Report	Michelsen 34'; Punt 48'

Umpires:
Sarah Wilson (GBR)
Claire Adenot (FRA)

===== Final =====
4 July 2015
18:00

Netherlands	2–1	South Korea
Van Maasakker 44'; Hoog 58'	Report	Kim B. 34'

Umpires:
Laurine Delforge (BEL)
Amber Church (NZL)

=== Awards ===
Top Goalscorers	Player of the Tournament	Goalkeeper of the Tournament	Young Player of the Tournament
(Australia) Jodie Kenny	(Netherlands) Lidewij Welten	(New Zealand) Sally Rutherford	(Netherlands) Xan de Waard

== Final rankings ==
Qualification for 2016 Summer Olympics

Rank	Valencia	Antwerp
1	Great Britain	Netherlands
2	China	South Korea
3	Germany	Australia
4	Argentina	New Zealand
5	United States	India
6	Spain	Japan
7	South Africa	Belgium
8	Ireland	Italy
9	Canada	Poland
10	Uruguay	France

Continental champions
Qualified through 2014–15 FIH Hockey World League
Withdrew from participating

== Goalscorers ==
The following goalscorers list comprises players from both events.

There were 259 goals scored in 66 matches, for an average of 3.92 goals per match.

10 goals

- (Australia) Jodie Kenny

9 goals

- (Netherlands) Maartje Paumen
- (New Zealand) Gemma Flynn

8 goals

- (Netherlands) Lidewij Welten

6 goals

- (Netherlands) Caia van Maasakker
- (New Zealand) Anita Punt

5 goals

- (Argentina) Carla Rebecchi
- (United Kingdom) Sophie Bray
- (South Korea) Park Mi-Hyun

4 goals

- (United Kingdom) Alex Danson
- (India) Ritu Rani
- (Ireland) Nicola Evans
- (Ireland) Anna O'Flanagan
- (Japan) Shihori Oikawa
- (New Zealand) Kirsten Pearce
- (Spain) Lola Riera

3 goals

- (Argentina) Agustina Albertario
- (Belgium) Louise Versavel
- (Germany) Lydia Haase
- (Germany) Hannah Krüger
- (Netherlands) Ellen Hoog
- (New Zealand) Olivia Merry
- (South Korea) Kim Jong-Eun
- (United States) Lauren Crandall
- (United States) Katie Reinprecht
- (United States) Kathleen Sharkey

2 goals

- (Argentina) Noel Barrionuevo
- (Argentina) Florencia Habif
- (Australia) Georgia Nanscawen
- (Australia) Kathryn Slattery
- (Australia) Emily Smith
- (Belgium) Manon Simons
- (China) Wang Mengyu
- (Germany) Eileen Hoffmann
- (Germany) Charlotte Stapenhorst
- (India) Vandana Katariya
- (Italy) Valentina Braconi
- (Italy) Giuliana Ruggieri
- (Italy) Agata Wybieralska
- (Japan) Akiko Kato
- (Japan) Akane Shibata
- (Netherlands) Carlien Dirkse van den Heuvel
- (Netherlands) Kelly Jonker
- (Netherlands) Naomi van As
- (Netherlands) Maria Verschoor
- (Netherlands) Ginella Zerbo
- (New Zealand) Petrea Webster
- (Poland) Amelia Katerla
- (Poland) Natalia Wiśniewska
- (South Africa) Kelly Madsen
- (South Korea) Kim Bo-Mi
- (South Korea) Cheon Eun-Bi
- (South Korea) Han Hye-Lyoung
- (South Korea) Oh Sun-Soon
- (United States) Katie O'Donnell
- (United States) Jill Witmer
- (Uruguay) Manuela Vilar

1 goal

- (Argentina) Julia Gomes Fantasia
- (Argentina) Delfina Merino
- (Argentina) Macarena Rodríguez
- (Argentina) Rocío Sánchez Moccia
- (Australia) Madonna Blyth
- (Australia) Jane Claxton
- (Australia) Anna Flanagan
- (Australia) Karri McMahon
- (Australia) Georgina Parker
- (Australia) Mariah Williams
- (Belgium) Stéphanie de Groof
- (Belgium) Emilie Sinia
- (Belgium) Lieselotte van Lindt
- (Belgium) Stéphanie Vanden Borre
- (Belgium) Judith Vandermeiren
- (Canada) Danielle Hennig
- (Canada) Stephanie Norlander
- (Canada) Brienne Stairs
- (Canada) Kaelan Watson
- (China) De Jiaojiao
- (China) Ma Wei
- (China) Zhang Xiaoxue
- (China) Peng Yang
- (France) Marie Billore
- (France) Elysee Lecas
- (Germany) Lisa Altenburg
- (Germany) Anissa Korth
- (Germany) Nike Lorenz
- (Germany) Marie Mävers
- (Germany) Anne Schröder
- (United Kingdom) Joie Leigh
- (United Kingdom) Hannah MacLeod
- (United Kingdom) Lily Owsley
- (United Kingdom) Kate Richardson-Walsh
- (United Kingdom) Georgie Twigg
- (United Kingdom) Hollie Webb
- (India) Poonam Rani
- (Ireland) Aine Connery
- (Ireland) Nicola Daly
- (Ireland) Megan Frazer
- (Ireland) Chloe Watkins
- (Italy) Marcela Casale
- (Italy) Elisabetta Pacella
- (Italy) Macarena Ronsisvalli
- (Italy) Chiara Tiddi
- (Japan) Hazuki Nagai
- (Japan) Yuri Nagai
- (Netherlands) Willemijn Bos
- (Netherlands) Eva de Goede
- (Netherlands) Xan de Waard
- (Netherlands) Marloes Keetels
- (New Zealand) Sophie Cocks
- (New Zealand) Ella Gunson
- (New Zealand) Rose Keddell
- (New Zealand) Stacey Michelsen
- (New Zealand) Elizabeth Thompson
- (Poland) Adrianna Marcinkowska
- (Poland) Paula Sławińska
- (South Africa) Dirkie Chamberlain
- (South Africa) Lisa-Marie Deetlefs
- (South Africa) Lilian du Plessis
- (South Africa) Celia Evans
- (South Africa) Candice Manuel
- (South Korea) Baek Ee-Seul
- (South Korea) Park Seung-A
- (Spain) María Gómez
- (Spain) Cristina Guinea
- (Spain) Alicia Magaz
- (Spain) Beatriz Pérez
- (Spain) Carlota Petchamé
- (Spain) Rocío Ybarra
- (United States) Rachel Dawson
- (United States) Katelyn Falgowski
- (United States) Paige Selenski
- (United States) Michelle Vittese
- (Uruguay) Janine Stanley

Source: Antwerp Valencia
