= 2019 Women's Oceania Cup =

Field hockey tournament

2019 Oceania Cup
Tournament details
- Host country: Australia
- City: Rockhampton
- Dates: 5–8 September
- Venue: Kalka Shades Hockey Fields

Final positions
- Champions: New Zealand (4th title)
- Runner-up: Australia

Tournament statistics
- Matches played: 3
- Goals scored: 11 (3.67 per match)
- Top scorer: (New Zealand) Olivia Merry (2 goals)

The 2019 Women's Oceania Cup was the eleventh edition of the women's field hockey tournament. It was held from 5 to 8 September in Rockhampton.

The tournament served as a qualifier for the 2020 Summer Olympics.

New Zealand won the tournament for the fourth time, finishing ahead of Australia on goal difference.

== Background ==
Australia were three-time back-to-back defending champions. The winners of the Cup earned an automatic place at the 2020 Olympic Games.

The hosting announcement of the Rockhampton Hockey Association came as $5 million was being invested into the hockey centre to upgrade the facilities. In March 2019, Stirling Hinchliffe, MLA for Sandgate and Minister for Local Government, Racing and Multicultural Affairs announced that the Government of Queensland had invested $2.5 million into the Kalka Shades, the home of the Rockhampton Hockey Association.

== Teams ==
Australia

Head Coach: Paul Gaudoin

1. Sophie Taylor
2. Ambrosia Malone
3. Brooke Peris
4. Amy Lawton
5. Ashlee Wells (GK)
7. Jodie Kenny (C)
9. Lily Brazel
10. Madison Fitzpatrick
13. Edwina Bone
15. Kaitlin Nobbs
17. Georgina Morgan (C)
18. Jane Claxton
21. Renee Taylor
23. Kalindi Commerford
24. Mariah Williams
26. Emily Chalker (C)
27. Rachael Lynch (GK)
32. Savannah Fitzpatrick
New Zealand

Head Coach: Graham Shaw

1. Tarryn Davey
2. Olivia Shannon
4. Olivia Merry
5. Frances Davies
6. Amy Robinson
8. Sally Rutherford (GK)
9. Brooke Neal
11. Rachel McCann
12. Ella Gunson
13. Samantha Charlton
15. Grace O'Hanlon (GK)
17. Stephanie Dickins
18. Kirsten Pearce
20. Megan Hull
24. Rose Keddell
27. Holly Pearson
31. Stacey Michelsen (C)
33. Julia King

== Results ==
All times are local (AEST).

=== Pool ===
Pos	Team	Pld	W	D	L	GF	GA	GD	Pts	Qualification
1st place, gold medalist(s)	New Zealand	3	1	1	1	6	5	+1	4	2020 Summer Olympics
2nd place, silver medalist(s)	Australia (H)	3	1	1	1	5	6	−1	4	

Source: FIH
Rules for classification: 1) points; 2) goal difference; 3) goals scored; 4) head-to-head result.
(H) Hosts

=== Fixtures ===
5 September 2019
18:00

Australia	1–3	New Zealand
Lawton 54'	Report	Hull 20'; Robinson 42'; Michelsen 43'

Umpires:
Liu Xiaoying (CHN)
Irene Presenqui (ARG)

7 September 2019
16:00

Australia	3–2	New Zealand
M. Fitzpatrick 5'; Peris 43'; R. Taylor 60'	Report	Merry 15'; Gunson 47'

Umpires:
Irene Presenqui (ARG)
Liu Xiaoying (CHN)

8 September 2019
16:00

Australia	1–1	New Zealand
Williams 2'	Report	Merry 55'

Umpires:
Liu Xiaoying (CHN)
Irene Presenqui (ARG)

== Statistics ==
=== Final standings ===
1. New Zealand
2. Australia

=== Goalscorers ===
There were 11 goals scored in 3 matches, for an average of 3.67 goals per match.

2 goals

- (New Zealand) Olivia Merry

1 goal

- (Australia) Madison Fitzpatrick
- (Australia) Amy Lawton
- (Australia) Brooke Peris
- (Australia) Renee Taylor
- (Australia) Mariah Williams
- (New Zealand) Elizabeth Gunson
- (New Zealand) Megan Hull
- (New Zealand) Stacey Michelsen
- (New Zealand) Amy Robinson
