= 2015 Women's Oceania Cup =

Field hockey tournament

2015 Oceania Cup
Tournament details
- Host country: New Zealand
- City: Stratford
- Dates: 21–25 October
- Venue: TET MultiSports Centre

Final positions
- Champions: Australia (6th title)
- Runner-up: New Zealand
- Third place: Samoa

Tournament statistics
- Matches played: 4
- Goals scored: 62 (15.5 per match)
- Top scorer: (New Zealand) Kirsten Pearce (7 goals)

The 2015 Women's Oceania Cup was the ninth edition of the women's field hockey tournament. It was held from 21 to 25 October in Stratford.

The tournament served as a qualifier for the 2016 Summer Olympics.

Australia won the tournament for the sixth time, defeating New Zealand 2–1 in penalties after the final finished in a 2–2 draw.

== Teams ==
- Australia
- New Zealand
- Samoa

== Results ==
All times are local (NZDT).

=== Preliminary round ===
==== Pool ====
Pos	Team	Pld	W	D	L	GF	GA	GD	Pts	Qualification
1	New Zealand (H)	2	1	1	0	33	2	+31	4	Advanced to Final
2	Australia	2	1	1	0	27	2	+25	4	Advanced to Final
3	Samoa	2	0	0	2	0	56	−56	0	

Source: FIH
Rules for classification: 1) points; 2) goal difference; 3) goals scored; 4) head-to-head result.
(H) Hosts

==== Fixtures ====
21 October 2015
13:30

Samoa	0–31	New Zealand
	Report	Punt 2', 9', 43', 55'; Harrison 2', 8', 28', 33', 55'; Webster 14', 15', 20'; Cocks 14', 15'; Hayward 17', 39', 44'; Pearce 19', 24', 30', 34', 40', 42'; Neal 20'; Gunson 20'; Thompson 41', 51', 57', 59'; Merry 42', 47'

Umpires:
Rhiannon Murrie (AUS)
Lani Jackman (NZL)

22 October 2015
13:30

Australia	25–0	Samoa
Kenny 5', 18', 34'; Nelson 9', 29', 54'; Barden 9', 35'; Kershaw 9'; Smith 10', 31', 49', 55'; Claxton 13', 56'; Flanagan 14'; Peris 26', 37', 54'; Blyth 34'; McMahon 39'; Morgan 43'; Fitzpatrick 44', 50'; Williams 57'	Report

Umpires:
Joanne Cumming (NZL)
Anna Billing (NZL)

24 October 2015
13:45

New Zealand	2–2	Australia
Pearce 17'; Merry 39'	Report	Slattery 14'; Kenny 56'

Umpires:
Joanne Cumming (NZL)
Rhiannon Murrie (AUS)

=== Classification ===
==== Final ====
25 October 2015
13:45

New Zealand	1–1	Australia
Webster 9'	Report	Barden 23'
Penalties
Michelsen (penalty shoot-out missed); Gunson (penalty shoot-out missed); Charlton (penalty shoot-out missed); Harrison (penalty shoot-out scored); Merry (penalty shoot-out missed)	1–2	(penalty shoot-out missed) Smith; (penalty shoot-out missed) McMahon; (penalty shoot-out scored) Kenny; (penalty shoot-out scored) Williams

Umpires:
Rhiannon Murrie (AUS)
Joanne Cumming (NZL)

== Statistics ==
=== Final standings ===
As per statistical convention in field hockey, matches decided in extra time are counted as wins and losses, while matches decided by penalty shoot-outs are counted as draws.

Pos	Team	Pld	W	D	L	GF	GA	GD	Pts	Status
1st place, gold medalist(s)	Australia	3	1	2	0	28	3	+25	5	Qualified for 2016 Summer Olympics
2nd place, silver medalist(s)	New Zealand (H)	3	1	2	0	34	3	+31	5	
3rd place, bronze medalist(s)	Samoa	2	0	0	2	0	56	−56	0	

Source: FIH
(H) Hosts

=== Goalscorers ===
There were 62 goals scored in 4 matches, for an average of 15.5 goals per match.

7 goals

- (New Zealand) Kirsten Pearce

5 goals

- (New Zealand) Charlotte Harrison

4 goals

- (Australia) Jodie Kenny
- (Australia) Emily Smith
- (New Zealand) Anita Punt
- (New Zealand) Elizabeth Thompson
- (New Zealand) Petrea Webster

3 goals

- (Australia) Laura Barden
- (Australia) Ashleigh Nelson
- (Australia) Brooke Peris
- (New Zealand) Pippa Hayward
- (New Zealand) Olivia Merry

2 goals

- (Australia) Jane Claxton
- (Australia) Madison Fitzpatrick
- (New Zealand) Sophie Cocks

1 goal

- (Australia) Madonna Blyth
- (Australia) Anna Flanagan
- (Australia) Stephanie Kershaw
- (Australia) Karri McMahon
- (Australia) Georgina Morgan
- (Australia) Kathryn Slattery
- (Australia) Mariah Williams
- (New Zealand) Elizabeth Gunson
- (New Zealand) Brooke Neal
