= 2013 Women's Oceania Cup =

2013 Oceania Cup
Tournament details
- Host country: New Zealand
- City: Stratford
- Dates: 30 October – 3 November
- Venue: TET MultiSports Centre

Final positions
- Champions: Australia (5th title)
- Runner-up: New Zealand
- Third place: Samoa

Tournament statistics
- Matches played: 8
- Goals scored: 112 (14 per match)
- Top scorer: (Australia) Kellie White (11 goals)

The 2013 Women's Oceania Cup was the eighth edition of the women's field hockey tournament. It was held from 30 October to 3 November in Stratford.

The tournament served as a qualifier for the 2014 FIH World Cup.

Australia won the tournament for the fifth time, defeating New Zealand 5–4 in penalties after the final finished in a 2–2 draw. Samoa finished in third place, defeating Papua New Guinea 4–3 in penalties following a 0–0 draw.

== Teams ==
- Australia
- New Zealand
- Papua New Guinea
- Samoa

== Results ==
All times are local (NZDT).

=== Preliminary round ===
==== Pool ====
Pos	Team	Pld	W	D	L	GF	GA	GD	Pts	Qualification
1	New Zealand (H)	3	3	0	0	54	2	+52	9	Advanced to Final
2	Australia	3	2	0	1	51	3	+48	6	Advanced to Final
3	Papua New Guinea	3	1	0	2	2	52	−50	3	
4	Samoa	3	0	0	3	1	51	−50	0	

Source: FIH
Rules for classification: 1) points; 2) goal difference; 3) goals scored; 4) head-to-head result.
(H) Hosts

==== Fixtures ====
30 October 2013
13:30

Samoa	1–2	Papua New Guinea
Fagalilo 68'	Report	Raurela 12', 21'

Umpires:
Lani Jackman (NZL)
Emily O'Shea (AUS)

30 October 2013
17:30

New Zealand	3–2	Australia
Flynn 7'; Webster 34'; Cocks 60'	Report	White 25'; Peris 31'

Umpires:
Lynn Cowie-McAlister (AUS)
Kelly Hudson (NZL)

31 October 2013
13:30

Australia	23–0	Samoa
Bone 3'; Nelson 6', 62'; Claxton 7'; White 13', 21', 37', 48', 50'; Flanagan 17', 26', 46'; Blyth 19', 30'; Schulz 23'; Eastham 30'; Smith 34', 60', 66', 68'; Holzberger 52'; Parker 54'; Messent 60'	Report

Umpires:
Emily O'Shea (AUS)
Kelly Hudson (NZL)

31 October 2013
17:30

Papua New Guinea	0–25	New Zealand
	Report	Flynn 4', 21', 34', 58'; Punt 6', 43', 55', 59'; Cocks 12', 19', 33', 57', 60', 69'; Forgesson 13', 22', 54'; Sharland 15', 25'; Charlton 17'; Webster 23', 28', 65'; Dennison 62'; King 67'

Umpires:
Lynn Cowie-McAlister (AUS)
Katrina Woolf (NZL)

2 November 2013
08:00

Australia	26–0	Papua New Guinea
Holzberger 4'; Messent 8', 35'; Nelson 10', 11', 19', 21', 34', 43'; White 13', 16', 24', 32', 43'; Parker 15', 31', 40', 49'; 26', 33'; Eastham 38'; Schulz 45', 62'; Peris 56', 58'; Claxton 70'	Report

Umpires:
Emily O'Shea (AUS)
Katrina Woolf (NZL)

2 November 2013
12:00

New Zealand	26–0	Samoa
Punt 5', 16', 48'; Keddell 7', 29', 43'; Flynn 8', 22', 34'; Charlton 9', 70'; Cocks 11'; Webster 13', 18'; Merry 14', 44', 46', 53'; Thompson 14'; Forgesson 23', 63'; King 38', 58', 70+'; Blackwood 50'; Sharland 61'	Report

Umpires:
Lani Jackman (NZL)
Lynn Cowie-McAlister (AUS)

=== Classification ===
==== Third and fourth place ====
3 November 2013
09:15

Papua New Guinea	0–0	Samoa
	Report
Penalties
Kiapin (penalty shoot-out scored); Bon (penalty shoot-out scored); Kisapai (penalty shoot-out missed); Kahai (penalty shoot-out scored); Tapo (penalty shoot-out missed); Kiapin (penalty shoot-out missed)	3–4	(penalty shoot-out missed) Ah Sam; (penalty shoot-out scored) Fagalilo; (penalty shoot-out scored) Pereira; (penalty shoot-out scored) Mualia-Te'o; (penalty shoot-out missed) A. Vai'au; (penalty shoot-out scored) Fagalilo

Umpires:
Katrina Woolf (NZL)
Lani Jackman (NZL)

==== Final ====
3 November 2013
14:00

New Zealand	2–2	Australia
Forgesson 17'; Webster 55'	Report	Holzberger 5'; Blyth 62'
Penalties
Sharland (penalty shoot-out scored); Charlton (penalty shoot-out missed); Dennison (penalty shoot-out scored); Flynn (penalty shoot-out scored); Punt (penalty shoot-out missed); Sharland (penalty shoot-out scored); Charlton (penalty shoot-out missed)	4–5	(penalty shoot-out scored) Blyth; (penalty shoot-out scored) White; (penalty shoot-out missed) Flanagan; (penalty shoot-out missed) Parker; (penalty shoot-out scored) Messent; (penalty shoot-out scored) Blyth; (penalty shoot-out scored) White

Umpires:
Kelly Hudson (NZL)
Lynn Cowie-McAlister (AUS)

== Statistics ==
=== Final standings ===
As per statistical convention in field hockey, matches decided in extra time are counted as wins and losses, while matches decided by penalty shoot-outs are counted as draws.

Pos	Team	Pld	W	D	L	GF	GA	GD	Pts	Status
1st place, gold medalist(s)	Australia	4	2	1	1	53	5	+48	7	Qualified for 2014 FIH World Cup
2nd place, silver medalist(s)	New Zealand (H)	4	3	1	0	56	4	+52	10	
3rd place, bronze medalist(s)	Samoa	4	0	1	3	1	51	−50	1	
4	Papua New Guinea	4	1	1	2	2	52	−50	4	

Source: FIH
(H) Hosts

=== Goalscorers ===
There were 112 goals scored in 8 matches, for an average of 14 goals per match.

11 goals

- (Australia) Kellie White

8 goals

- (Australia) Ashleigh Nelson
- (New Zealand) Sophie Cocks
- (New Zealand) Gemma Flynn

7 goals

- (New Zealand) Anita Punt
- (New Zealand) Petrea Webster

6 goals

- (New Zealand) Krystal Forgesson

5 goals

- (Australia) Georgina Parker

4 goals

- (Australia) Emily Smith
- (New Zealand) Julia King
- (New Zealand) Olivia Merry

3 goals

- (Australia) Madonna Blyth
- (Australia) Anna Flanagan
- (Australia) Jordyn Holzberger
- (Australia) Claire Messent
- (Australia) Brooke Peris
- (Australia) Jodie Schulz
- (New Zealand) Samantha Charlton
- (New Zealand) Rose Keddell
- (New Zealand) Kayla Sharland

2 goals

- (Australia) Jane Claxton
- (Australia) Casey Eastham
- (Papua New Guinea) Kari Raurela

1 goal

- (Australia) Edwina Bone
- (New Zealand) Bridget Blackwood
- (New Zealand) Rhiannon Dennison
- (New Zealand) Elizabeth Thompson
- (Samoa) Sharlene Fagalilo

2 own goals

- Papua New Guinea (against Australia)
