= Brooke Peris =

Australian field hockey player

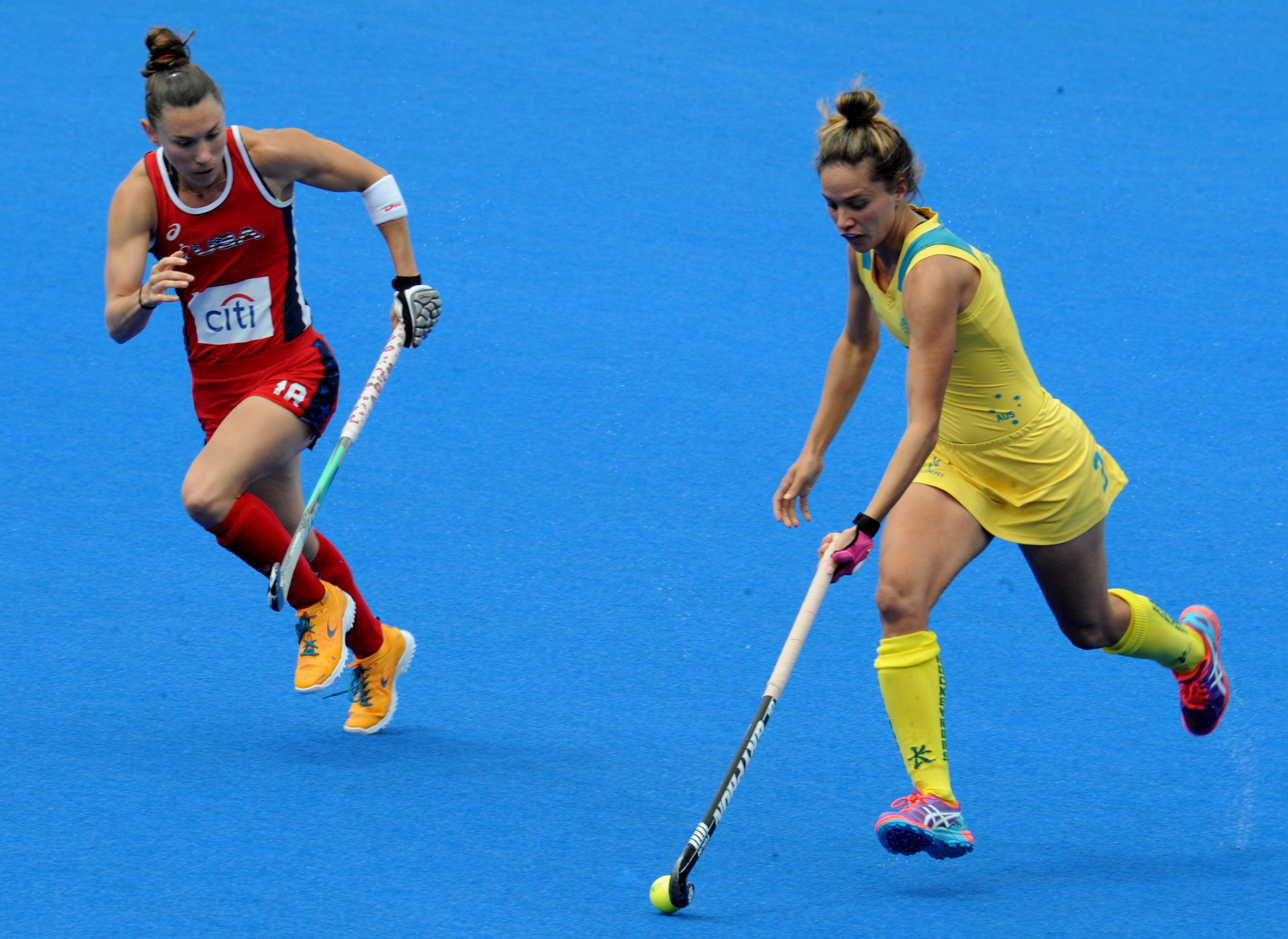

Personal information
- Born: 16 January 1993 (age 33) Darwin, Northern Territory, Australia
- Height: 1.72 m (5 ft 8 in)
- Weight: 57 kg (126 lb)

Sport
- Sport: Field hockey
- Position: Forward
- Club: Adelaide Fire
National team
Years	Team	Caps	Goals
2011–2013	Australia U–21	14	(4)
2013–2024	Australia	214	(40)
Medal record
Women's field hockey
Representing Australia
Commonwealth Games
Gold medal – first place	2014 Glasgow	Team
Silver medal – second place	2018 Gold Coast	Team
FIH Pro League
Silver medal – second place	Season One	Team
Bronze medal – third place	Season Four	Team
FIH Champions Trophy
Silver medal – second place	2014 Mendoza
Silver medal – second place	2018 Changzhou
FIH World League
Silver medal – second place	2012–13 Tucumán	Team
Oceania Cup
Gold medal – first place	2013 Stratford
Gold medal – first place	2015 Stratford
Gold medal – first place	2017 Sydney
Gold medal – first place	2023 Whangārei
Silver medal – second place	2019 Rockhampton

Brooke Peris (born 16 January 1993) is an Australian former field hockey player, who represented the national team, the Hockeyroos. In 2014, Peris was awarded the title of "Northern Territory Sportsperson of the Year."

== Early life ==
Brooke Peris was born on 16 January 1993 in Darwin, Australia. She is the first cousin of former national field hockey player and former Australian senator Nova Peris.

== Career ==
Peris made her international debut in 2013, during a test series against South Korea in Perth.

She represented Australia at three editions of the Summer Olympics, competing at the 2016 Summer Olympics in Rio de Janeiro, the 2020 Summer Olympics in Tokyo, and finally the 2024 Summer Olympics in Paris.

She is a former co–captain of the national team, holding the role from 2021 to 2024.

On 28 October 2024, alongside former co–captain Jane Claxton, Peris announced her retirement from international hockey.

== International goals ==
The following list compiles all international goals scored by Peris.

Goal	Date	Location	Opponent	Score	Result	Competition	Ref.
1	22 October 2013	Perth Hockey Stadium, Perth, Australia	Canada	3–0	3–0	Test Match	
2	30 October 2013	Stratford Hockey Turf, Stratford, New Zealand	New Zealand	2–1	2–3	2013 Oceania Cup	
3	2 November 2013	Stratford Hockey Turf, Stratford, New Zealand	Papua New Guinea	23–0	26–0	2013 Oceania Cup	
4	2 November 2013	Stratford Hockey Turf, Stratford, New Zealand	Papua New Guinea	24–0	26–0	2013 Oceania Cup	
5	22 January 2014	Hartleyvale Stadium, Cape Town, South Africa	South Africa	3–3	3–3	Test Match	
6	28 March 2014	Perth Hockey Stadium, Perth, Australia	Japan	4–0	5–2	Test Match	
7	12 April 2014	Hawke's Bay Hockey, Hastings, New Zealand	New Zealand	2–1	4–2	2014 Hawke's Bay Cup	
8	25 July 2014	Glasgow National Hockey Centre, Glasgow, Scotland	Wales	6–0	9–0	XX Commonwealth Games	
9	19 April 2015	Hawke's Bay Hockey, Hastings, New Zealand	New Zealand	2–1	3–2	2015 Hawke's Bay Cup	
10	22 October 2015	Stratford Hockey Turf, Stratford, New Zealand	Samoa	9–0	25–0	2015 Oceania Cup	
11	22 October 2015	Stratford Hockey Turf, Stratford, New Zealand	Samoa	15–0	25–0	2015 Oceania Cup	
12	22 October 2015	Stratford Hockey Turf, Stratford, New Zealand	Samoa	22–0	25–0	2015 Oceania Cup	
13	21 January 2016	Sengkang Hockey Stadium, Singapore	Germany	1–0	3–1	Test Match	
14	20 November 2016	Lloyd Elsmore Hockey Stadium, Auckland, New Zealand	New Zealand	2–3	2–3	2016 Trans–Tasman Trophy	
15	27 November 2016	Melbourne Sports Centre, Melbourne, Australia	India	1–1	3–1	2016 International Festival of Hockey	
16	12 October 2017	Sydney Olympic Park, Sydney, Australia	Papua New Guinea	11–0	23–0	2017 Oceania Cup	
17	14 October 2017	Sydney Olympic Park, Sydney, Australia	New Zealand	2–0	2–1	2017 Oceania Cup	
18	9 November 2017	Melbourne Sports Centre, Melbourne, Australia	United States	2–2	3–2	2017 International Festival of Hockey	
19	12 November 2017	Melbourne Sports Centre, Melbourne, Australia	United States	2–0	5–0	2017 International Festival of Hockey	
20	12 November 2017	Melbourne Sports Centre, Melbourne, Australia	United States	4–0	5–0	2017 International Festival of Hockey	
21	7 April 2018	Gold Coast Hockey Centre, Gold Coast, Australia	Ghana	5–0	5–0	XXI Commonwealth Games	
22	20 May 2018	Central Otago Sports Club, Cromwell, New Zealand	New Zealand	2–1	4–1	2018 Tri–Nations Tournament	
23	21 May 2018	Central Otago Sports Club, Cromwell, New Zealand	Japan	3–1	4–1	2018 Tri–Nations Tournament	
24	27 May 2018	Central Otago Sports Club, Cromwell, New Zealand	New Zealand	4–1	4–1	2018 Tri–Nations Tournament	
25	7 November 2018	Wuijin Hockey Stadium, Changzhou, China	Great Britain	1–0	2–0	2018 FIH Champions Trophy	
26	3 February 2019	Melbourne Sports Centre, Melbourne, Australia	Belgium	1–2	1–2	2019 FIH Pro League	
27	19 June 2019	Lee Valley Hockey and Tennis Centre, London, England	Great Britain	2–0	4–2	2019 FIH Pro League	
28	7 September 2019	Kalka Shades Hockey Fields, Rockhampton, Australia	New Zealand	2–1	3–2	2019 Oceania Cup	
29	26 July 2021	Oi Hockey Stadium, Tokyo, Japan	China	3–0	6–0	XXXII Olympic Games	
30	12 May 2022	National Hockey Centre, Auckland, New Zealand	New Zealand	1–0	2–1	2022 Trans–Tasman Series	
31	12 May 2022	National Hockey Centre, Auckland, New Zealand	New Zealand	2–1	2–1	2022 Trans–Tasman Series	
32	15 May 2022	National Hockey Centre, Auckland, New Zealand	New Zealand	2–1	2–1	2022 Trans–Tasman Series	
33	13 February 2023	Sydney Olympic Park, Sydney, Australia	China	2–2	2–2	2022–23 FIH Pro League	
34	15 February 2023	Sydney Olympic Park, Sydney, Australia	Germany	2–1	3–3	2022–23 FIH Pro League	
35	11 June 2023	HC Oranje-Rood, Eindhoven, Netherlands	Netherlands	1–1	3–3	2022–23 FIH Pro League	
36	10 August 2023	Northland Hockey Association, Whangārei, New Zealand	New Zealand	3–0	3–0	2023 Oceania Cup	
37	13 August 2023	Northland Hockey Association, Whangārei, New Zealand	New Zealand	1–1	3–2	2023 Oceania Cup	
38	29 May 2024	Wilrijkse Plein, Antwerp, Belgium	Belgium	2–1	2–2	2023–24 FIH Pro League	
39	8 June 2024	Lee Valley Hockey and Tennis Centre, London, England	Great Britain	1–0	3–0	2023–24 FIH Pro League	
40	12 June 2024	Lee Valley Hockey and Tennis Centre, London, England	Great Britain	2–1	3–2	2023–24 FIH Pro League	
