= 2017 Women's Oceania Cup =

Field hockey tournament

2017 Oceania Cup
Tournament details
- Host country: Australia
- City: Sydney
- Dates: 11–15 October
- Venue: Sydney Olympic Park

Final positions
- Champions: Australia (7th title)
- Runner-up: New Zealand
- Third place: Papua New Guinea

Tournament statistics
- Matches played: 4
- Goals scored: 61 (15.25 per match)
- Top scorer: (New Zealand) Samantha Harrison (9 goals)

The 2017 Women's Oceania Cup was the tenth edition of the women's field hockey tournament. It was held from 11 to 15 October in Stratford.

The tournament served as a qualifier for the 2018 FIH World Cup.

Australia won the tournament for the seventh time, defeating New Zealand 2–0 in the final.

== Teams ==
- Australia
- New Zealand
- Papua New Guinea

== Results ==
All times are local (AEDT).

=== Preliminary round ===
==== Pool ====
Pos	Team	Pld	W	D	L	GF	GA	GD	Pts	Qualification
1	Australia (H)	2	2	0	0	25	1	+24	6	Advanced to Final
2	New Zealand	2	1	0	1	34	2	+32	3	Advanced to Final
3	Papua New Guinea	2	0	0	2	0	56	−56	0	

Source: FIH
Rules for classification: 1) points; 2) goal difference; 3) goals scored; 4) head-to-head result.
(H) Hosts

==== Fixtures ====
11 October 2017
18:00

Papua New Guinea	0–33	New Zealand
	Report	Harrison 3', 4', 6', 14', 21', 28', 36', 38', 53'; Robinson 7'; McCann 10', 17', 19', 23', 24', 25', 31'; Merry 14', 23', 33', 35', 39', 58', 60'; Keddell 24'; Fitzsimons 27'; Gloyn 28', 52', 57'; Thompson 29', 30'; Tanner 53'; Charlton 55'

Umpires:
Kirsty Lee (AUS)
Michelle Farnill (AUS)

12 October 2017
18:00

Australia	23–0	Papua New Guinea
Taylor 2', 60'; Stewart 3', 23', 33'; Slattery 4', 16', 17', 45', 48'; Nance 6', 11'; Smith 9', 29', 37', 43', 47'; Peris 31'; Fitzpatrick 34', 53'; Nobbs 44'; Bates 57'; Hanna 59'	Report

Umpires:
Lucy Lawlor (NZL)
Rachel Murphy (NZL)

14 October 2017
17:00

New Zealand	1–2	Australia
Merry 53'	Report	Fitzpatrick 12'; Peris 22'

Umpires:
Kerryl Chandler (AUS)
Lucy Lawlor (NZL)

=== Classification ===
==== Final ====
15 October 2017
15:00

Australia	2–0	New Zealand
Claxton 3'; Bates 30'	Report

Umpires:
Kerryl Chandler (AUS)
Lucy Lawlor (NZL)

== Statistics ==
=== Final standings ===
As per statistical convention in field hockey, matches decided in extra time are counted as wins and losses, while matches decided by penalty shoot-outs are counted as draws.

Pos	Team	Pld	W	D	L	GF	GA	GD	Pts	Status
1st place, gold medalist(s)	Australia (H)	3	3	0	0	27	1	+26	9	Qualified for 2018 FIH World Cup
2nd place, silver medalist(s)	New Zealand	3	1	0	2	34	4	+30	3	
3rd place, bronze medalist(s)	Papua New Guinea	2	0	0	2	0	56	−56	0	

Source: FIH
(H) Hosts

=== Goalscorers ===
There were 61 goals scored in 4 matches, for an average of 15.2 goals per match.

9 goals

- (New Zealand) Samantha Harrison

8 goals

- (New Zealand) Olivia Merry

7 goals

- (New Zealand) Rachel McCann

5 goals

- (Australia) Kathryn Slattery
- (Australia) Emily Smith

3 goals

- (Australia) Madison Fitzpatrick
- (Australia) Grace Stewart
- (New Zealand) Shiloh Gloyn

2 goals

- (Australia) Kristina Bates
- (Australia) Gabrielle Nance
- (Australia) Brooke Peris
- (Australia) Renee Taylor
- (New Zealand) Elizabeth Thompson

1 goal

- (Australia) Jane Claxton
- (Australia) Kate Hanna
- (Australia) Kaitlin Nobbs
- (New Zealand) Samantha Charlton
- (New Zealand) Natasha FitzSimons
- (New Zealand) Rose Keddell
- (New Zealand) Amy Robinson
- (New Zealand) Kim Tanner
