= Jodie Kenny =

Australian field hockey player

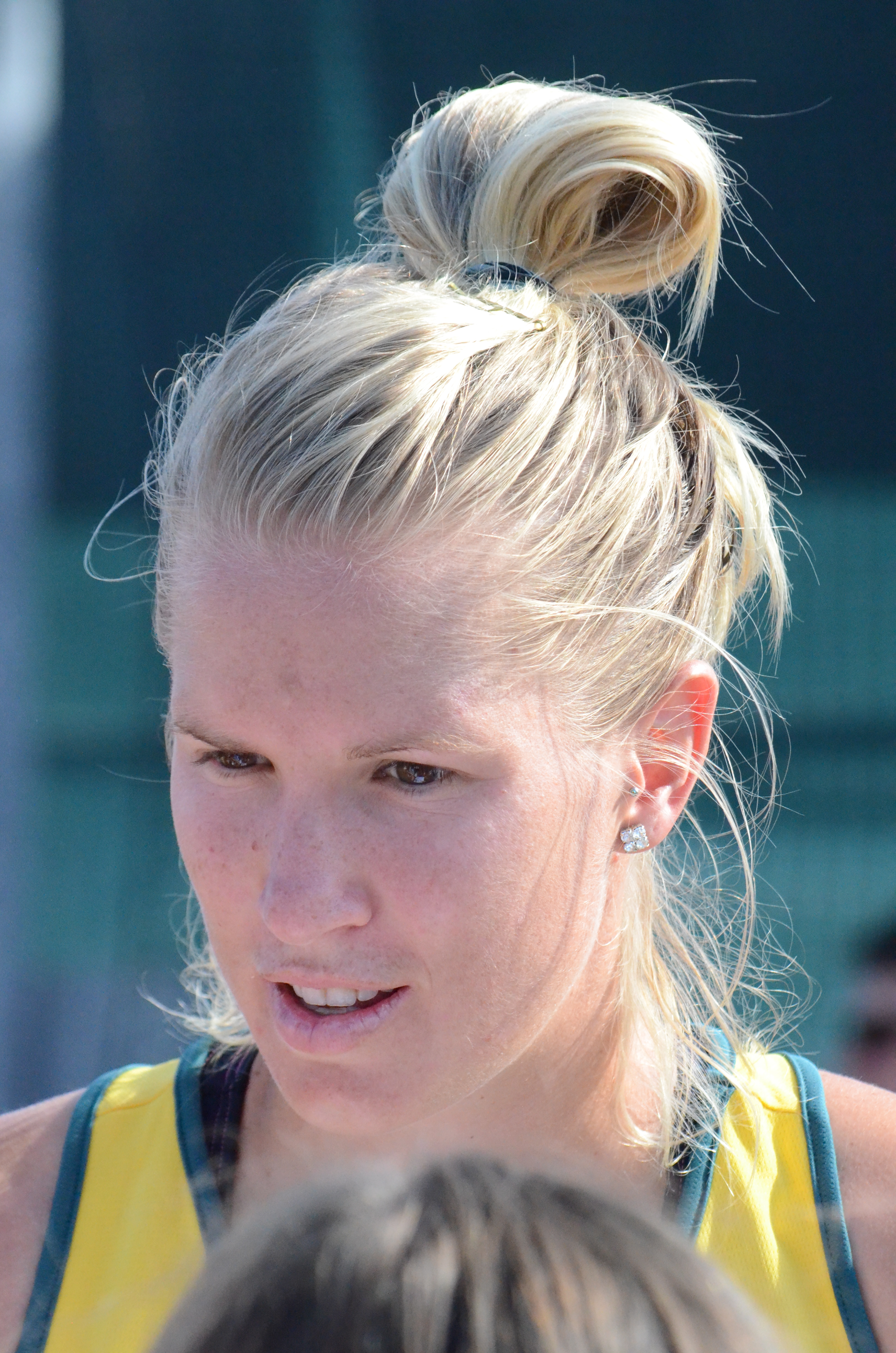

Personal information
- Full name: Jodie Kenny
- Born: 18 August 1987 (age 39) Wamuran, Queensland
- Height: 1.83 m (6 ft 0 in)
- Weight: 74 kg (163 lb)

Sport
- Sport: Field hockey
- Position: Defender
- Club: Queensland Scorchers
National team
Years	Team	Caps	Goals
2011–2020	Australia	235	(111)
Medal record
Women's field hockey
Representing Australia
World Cup
Silver medal – second place	2014 The Hague
Commonwealth Games
Gold medal – first place	2014 Glasgow	Team
Silver medal – second place	2018 Gold Coast	Team
FIH Pro League
Silver medal – second place	2019 Amstelveen
Champions Trophy
Silver medal – second place	2014 Mendoza
Silver medal – second place	2018 Changzhou
Oceania Cup
Gold medal – first place	2013 Stratford
Gold medal – first place	2015 Stratford
Silver medal – second place	2011 Hobart
Silver medal – second place	2019 Rockhampton

Jodie Kenny (née Schulz; born 18 August 1987) is an Australian field hockey player.

Kenny was a member of the Australia women's national field hockey team that were defeated by the Netherlands women's national field hockey team in the final of the 2014 Women's Hockey World Cup. She was a member of the Australian team that defeated England in the women's field hockey final at the 2014 Commonwealth Games, scoring a goal in the last minute of regular time that took the match into a penalty shoot-out. She plays for the Queensland Scorchers in the Australian Hockey League.

== Personal ==
Schulz was born in Redcliffe, and is from Queensland. As of 2012, she lives in Perth, Western Australia. She attended Wamuran State Primary School before going to St Columbans College. She started working on a Bachelor Sport and Exercise Science at the University of Sunshine Coast in 2007 and was still enrolled in 2012. She was named the Sunshine Coast Sport Star of the Year senior monthly winner for April 2012.

Jodie married Shane Kenny, a fellow hockey player, in December 2013, changing her surname from Schulz to Kenny.

== Field hockey ==
Schulz has held field hockey scholarships with the Australian Institute of Sport and the Queensland Academy of Sport.

She plays for the Queensland Scorchers in the Australian Hockey League, making her debut in 2009.

=== National team ===
When the Hockeyroos got new coach Adam Commens in January 2011, Schulz was one of four players identified for to aide in developing the national side. In 2011, she made her senior national team debut at the Four Nations Tournament in Argentina, scoring two goals in her first game. Later in the year, in October, she was the national team captain during two games against China. In June 2012, she played in the Investec London Cup. In the 4–1 win against Ireland in the lead up London, she scored the team's third goal. As of June 2012, she had 43 caps with the Hockeyroos.

Schulz was named to the Australia women's national field hockey squad that will compete at the 2012 Summer Olympics, where she made her debut as a 24-year-old, one year after making her senior national team debut.

Jodie was a key part of the Hockeyroos' success in 2014, winning the Hockeyroos World Cup Player of the Year award, as well as the top scorer award with 29 goals. To date Jodie has scored 88 goals from 144 caps, while playing as a defender. Her pump up songs before matches are Daryl Braithwaite's The Horses and Tom Petty's I Won't Back Down.

She was the Hockeyroos's top scorer in 2014 and 2015, winning Hockeyroos player of the year in 2015.

At the 2016 Summer Olympics, she scored her 100th goal for Australia.

In 2016 after the Rio Olympics, she announced she was taking a break from the sport.

== International goals ==
No.	Date	Venue	Opponent	Score	Result	Competition
1.	13 February 2011	Mendoza, Argentina	Argentina	2–2	3–2	2011 Women's Four Nations Hockey Tournament
2.	13 February 2011	Mendoza, Argentina	Argentina	3–2	3–2	2011 Women's Four Nations Hockey Tournament
3.	20 February 2011	Rosario, Argentina	Germany	1–1	2–1	2011 Women's Four Nations Hockey Tournament
4.	2 April 2011	Canberra, Australia	Argentina	1–3	2–3	Test Match
5.	28 June 2011	Amstelveen, Netherlands	Germany	1–0	1–0	2011 Women's Hockey Champions Trophy
6.	30 June 2011	Amstelveen, Netherlands	China	2–0	2–2	2011 Women's Hockey Champions Trophy
7.	9 October 2011	Hobart, Australia	New Zealand	1–1	2–4	2011 Women's Oceania Cup
8.	26 October 2011	Busselton, Australia	China	1–0	3–1	Test Match
9.	26 October 2011	Busselton, Australia	China	2–1	3–1	Test Match
10.	27 October 2017	Busselton, Australia	China	1–0	1–0	Test Match
11.	2 November 2011	Perth, Australia	China	1–0	8–1	Test Match
12.	2 November 2011	Perth, Australia	China	4–0	8–1	Test Match
13.	2 November 2011	Perth, Australia	China	6–0	8–1	Test Match
14.	2 November 2011	Perth, Australia	China	8–0	8–1	Test Match
15.	22 January 2012	Buenos Aires, Argentina	Netherlands	3–1	4–1	Test Match
16.	9 March 2012	Perth, Australia	South Korea	2–0	5–0	Test Match
17.	9 March 2012	Perth, Australia	South Korea	5–0	5–0	Test Match
18.	10 March 2012	Perth, Australia	South Korea	3–1	3–1	Test Match
19.	12 April 2012	North Shore, New Zealand	United States	1–0	4–0	2012 Women's Four Nations Hockey Tournament
20.	13 April 2012	North Shore, New Zealand	New Zealand	2–1	3–1	2012 Women's Four Nations Hockey Tournament
21.	16 April 2012	North Shore, New Zealand	New Zealand	2–3	2–3	2012 Women's Four Nations Hockey Tournament
22.	18 April 2012	Auckland, New Zealand	New Zealand	2–1	3–3	2012 Women's Four Nations Hockey Tournament
23.	19 April 2012	Auckland, New Zealand	India	1–0	5–2	2012 Women's Four Nations Hockey Tournament
24.	19 April 2012	Auckland, New Zealand	India	3–1	5–2	2012 Women's Four Nations Hockey Tournament
25.	21 April 2012	Auckland, New Zealand	United States	1–0	5–1	2012 Women's Four Nations Hockey Tournament
26.	2 June 2012	London, United Kingdom	Great Britain	1–0	3–1	Test Match
27.	10 August 2012	London, United Kingdom	China	1–0	2–0	2012 Summer Olympics
28.	29 September 2012	Dublin, Ireland	Belgium	1–0	4–1	2012 Women's Hockey Champions Challenge I
29.	30 September 2012	Dublin, Ireland	India	3–1	8–1	2012 Women's Hockey Champions Challenge I
30.	30 September 2012	Dublin, Ireland	India	8–1	8–1	2012 Women's Hockey Champions Challenge I
31.	6 October 2012	Dublin, Ireland	Scotland	1–0	2–0	2012 Women's Hockey Champions Challenge I
32.	7 October 2012	Dublin, Ireland	United States	5–1	6–1	2012 Women's Hockey Champions Challenge I
33.	7 October 2012	Dublin, Ireland	United States	6–1	6–1	2012 Women's Hockey Champions Challenge I
34.	7 February 2013	Cape Town, South Africa	England	2–0	3–1	2013 Women's Hockey Investec Cup
35.	23 June 2013	London, United Kingdom	England	1–1	1–1	2012–13 Women's FIH Hockey World League Semifinals
36.	27 June 2013	London, United Kingdom	United States	4–1	4–1	2012–13 Women's FIH Hockey World League Semifinals
37.	24 October 2013	Perth, Australia	Canada	3–0	3–0	Test Match
38.	31 October 2013	Stratford, New Zealand	Samoa	8–0	23–0	2013 Women's Oceania Cup
39.	2 November 2013	Stratford, New Zealand	Papua New Guinea	21–0	26–0	2013 Women's Oceania Cup
40.	2 November 2013	Stratford, New Zealand	Papua New Guinea	25–0	26–0	2013 Women's Oceania Cup
41.	1 December 2013	San Miguel de Tucumán, Argentina	China	5–1	5–1	2012–13 Women's FIH Hockey World League Final
42.	3 December 2013	San Miguel de Tucumán, Argentina	New Zealand	4–1	5–1	2012–13 Women's FIH Hockey World League Final
43.	7 December 2013	San Miguel de Tucumán, Argentina	England	1–0	3–0	2012–13 Women's FIH Hockey World League Final
44.	22 January 2014	Stellenbosch, South Africa	South Africa	2–1	3–3	Test Match
45.	25 January 2014	Stellenbosch, South Africa	South Africa	1–0	4–1	Test Match
46.	22 March 2014	Kalgoorlie, Australia	Japan	2–0	3–1	Test Match
47.	22 March 2014	Kalgoorlie, Australia	Japan	3–0	3–1	Test Match
48.	25 March 2014	Perth, Australia	Japan	1–0	5–2	Test Match
49.	28 March 2014	Perth, Australia	Japan	2–0	5–2	Test Match
50.	10 April 2014	Hastings, New Zealand	South Korea	2–1	5–2	2014 Hawke's Bay Cup
51.	15 May 2014	Bremen, Germany	England	4–2	4–2	2014 Women's Four Nations Cup
52.	17 May 2014	Bremen, Germany	Japan	2–0	6–1	2014 Women's Four Nations Cup
53.	17 May 2014	Bremen, Germany	Japan	6–1	6–1	2014 Women's Four Nations Cup
54.	5 June 2014	The Hague, Netherlands	Belgium	2–1	3–2	2014 Women's Hockey World Cup
55.	5 June 2014	The Hague, Netherlands	Belgium	3–2	3–2	2014 Women's Hockey World Cup
56.	24 July 2014	Glasgow, Scotland	Malaysia	1–0	4–0	2014 Commonwealth Games
57.	25 July 2014	Glasgow, Scotland	Wales	1–0	9–0	2014 Commonwealth Games
58.	25 July 2014	Glasgow, Scotland	Wales	3–0	9–0	2014 Commonwealth Games
59.	25 July 2014	Glasgow, Scotland	Wales	5–0	9–0	2014 Commonwealth Games
60.	27 July 2014	Glasgow, Scotland	Scotland	1–0	9–0	2014 Commonwealth Games
61.	27 July 2014	Glasgow, Scotland	Scotland	3–0	9–0	2014 Commonwealth Games
62.	27 July 2014	Glasgow, Scotland	Scotland	4–0	9–0	2014 Commonwealth Games
63.	28 July 2014	Glasgow, Scotland	England	1–0	3–0	2014 Commonwealth Games
64.	28 July 2014	Glasgow, Scotland	England	3–0	3–0	2014 Commonwealth Games
65.	2 August 2014	Glasgow, Scotland	England	1–1	1–1 (3–1 p)	2014 Commonwealth Games
66.	18 November 2014	Wellington, New Zealand	New Zealand	1–2	3–3	Test Match
67.	29 November 2014	Mendoza, Argentina	England	1–0	2–1	2014 Women's Hockey Champions Trophy
68.	29 November 2014	Mendoza, Argentina	England	2–1	2–1	2014 Women's Hockey Champions Trophy
69.	2 December 2014	Mendoza, Argentina	Germany	2–0	3–1	2014 Women's Hockey Champions Trophy
70.	4 December 2014	Mendoza, Argentina	Japan	2–0	4–1	2014 Women's Hockey Champions Trophy
71.	4 December 2014	Mendoza, Argentina	Japan	3–1	4–1	2014 Women's Hockey Champions Trophy
72.	5 April 2015	Sydney, Australia	China	2–2	3–2	Test Match
73.	5 April 2015	Sydney, Australia	China	3–2	3–2	Test Match
74.	12 April 2015	Hastings, New Zealand	China	2–1	2–2	2015 Hawke's Bay Cup
75.	18 April 2015	Hastings, New Zealand	China	2–1	3–2	2015 Hawke's Bay Cup
76.	19 April 2015	Hastings, New Zealand	New Zealand	3–2	3–2	2015 Hawke's Bay Cup
77.	21 June 2015	Antwerp, Belgium	Poland	1–0	9–0	2014–15 Women's FIH Hockey World League Semifinals
78.	21 June 2015	Antwerp, Belgium	Poland	3–0	9–0	2014–15 Women's FIH Hockey World League Semifinals
79.	21 June 2015	Antwerp, Belgium	Poland	5–0	9–0	2014–15 Women's FIH Hockey World League Semifinals
80.	21 June 2015	Antwerp, Belgium	Poland	7–0	9–0	2014–15 Women's FIH Hockey World League Semifinals
81.	24 June 2015	Antwerp, Belgium	Belgium	1–0	2–0	2014–15 Women's FIH Hockey World League Semifinals
82.	27 June 2015	Antwerp, Belgium	India	1–0	4–2	2014–15 Women's FIH Hockey World League Semifinals
83.	27 June 2015	Antwerp, Belgium	India	2–1	4–2	2014–15 Women's FIH Hockey World League Semifinals
84.	27 June 2015	Antwerp, Belgium	India	3–2	4–2	2014–15 Women's FIH Hockey World League Semifinals
85.	27 June 2015	Antwerp, Belgium	India	4–2	4–2	2014–15 Women's FIH Hockey World League Semifinals
86.	30 June 2015	Antwerp, Belgium	Italy	1–0	2–0	2014–15 Women's FIH Hockey World League Semifinals
87.	22 October 2015	Stratford, New Zealand	Samoa	1–0	25–0	2015 Women's Oceania Cup
88.	22 October 2015	Stratford, New Zealand	Samoa	8–0	25–0	2015 Women's Oceania Cup
89.	22 October 2015	Stratford, New Zealand	Samoa	12–0	25–0	2015 Women's Oceania Cup
90.	24 November 2015	Stratford, New Zealand	New Zealand	2–2	2–2	2015 Women's Oceania Cup
91.	6 December 2015	Rosario, Argentina	Argentina	1–1	2–1	2014–15 Women's FIH Hockey World League Final
92.	5 April 2016	Hastings, New Zealand	Canada	2–0	4–0	2016 Hawke's Bay Cup
93.	10 April 2016	Hastings, New Zealand	China	3–0	3–1	2016 Hawke's Bay Cup
94.	31 May 2016	Darwin, Australia	Japan	1–0	3–1	2016 Women's International Hockey Open
95.	19 June 2016	London, United Kingdom	New Zealand	2–1	3–1	2016 Women's Hockey Champions Trophy
96.	25 June 2016	London, United Kingdom	Great Britain	4–1	4–1	2016 Women's Hockey Champions Trophy
97.	10 August 2016	Rio de Janeiro, Brazil	India	5–0	6–1	2016 Summer Olympics
98.	10 August 2016	Rio de Janeiro, Brazil	India	6–0	6–1	2016 Summer Olympics
