= Olivia Merry =

New Zealand hockey player (born 1992)

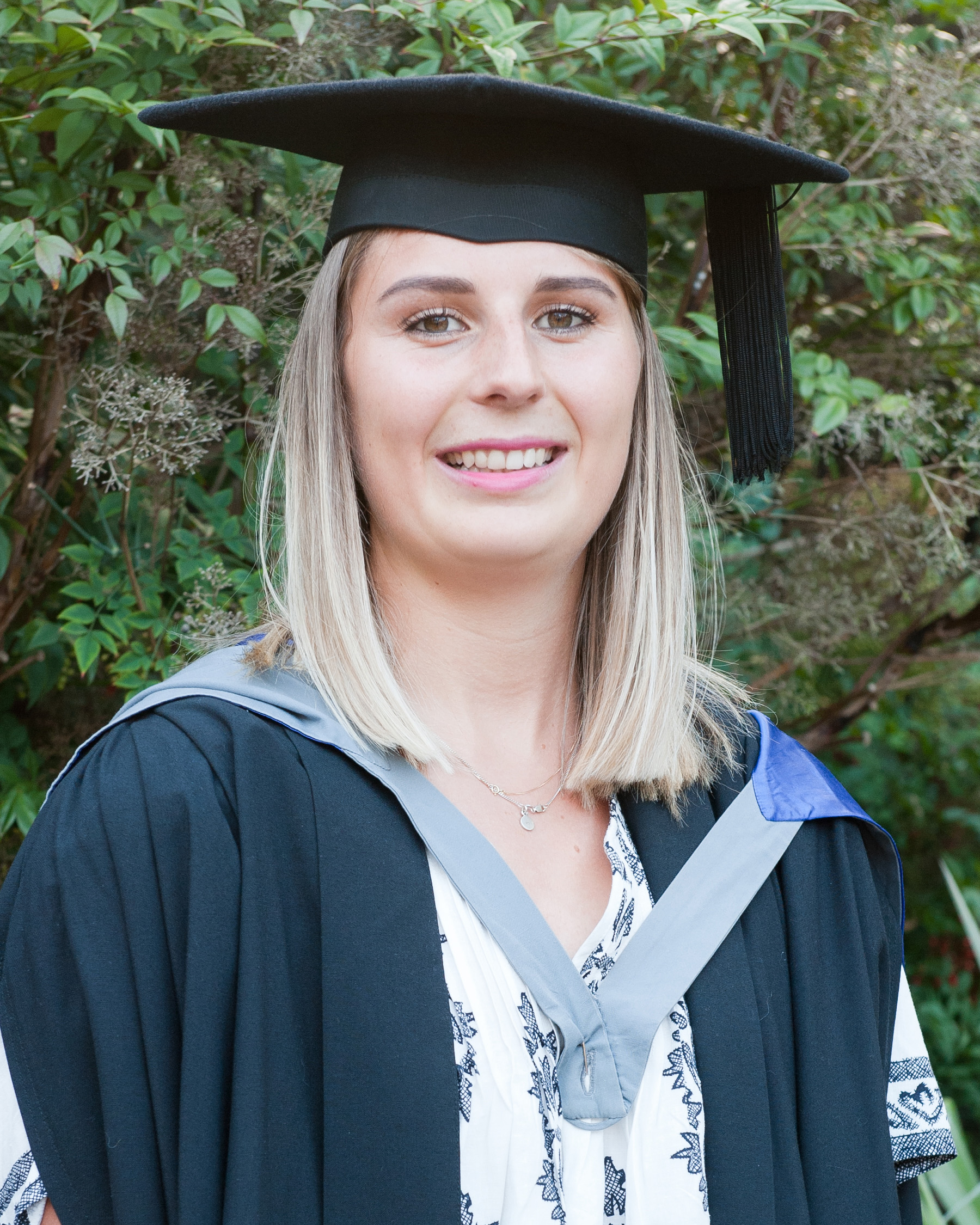
- Merry in 2015

Personal information
- Born: 16 March 1992 (age 34) Christchurch, New Zealand
- Height: 1.82 m (6 ft 0 in)
- Weight: 78 kg (172 lb)

Sport
- Sport: Field hockey
- Position: Striker
- Club: Canterbury
Senior career
Years	Team	Caps	Goals
–	Canterbury	-	-
National team
Years	Team	Caps	Goals
2012–2024	New Zealand	284	(128)
Medal record
Representing New Zealand
Women's field hockey
Commonwealth Games
Gold medal – first place	2018 Gold Coast	Team
Bronze medal – third place	2014 Glasgow	Team
Oceania Cup
Gold medal – first place	2019 Rockhampton
Silver medal – second place	2017 Sydney
Silver medal – second place	2023 Whangārei

Olivia Catherina Merry (born 16 March 1992) is a New Zealand field hockey player for the national team. She competed in the women's hockey tournament at the 2014 Commonwealth Games where she won a bronze medal. She also attended the 2018 Gold Coast Commonwealth Games where she and her team won gold.

== International goals ==
List of international goals scored by Olivia Merry
No.	Date	Venue	Opponent	Score	Result	Competition
1.	8 December 2012	Napier, New Zealand	India	2–?	7–2	Test match
2.	8 December 2012	Napier, New Zealand	India	7–?	7–2	Test match
3.	15 December 2012	Wellington, New Zealand	India	?–?	6–5	Test match
4.	20 April 2013	Tauranga, New Zealand	South Korea	5–1	5–1	2013 Women's Four Nations Hockey Tournament
5.	2 November 2013	Stratford, New Zealand	Samoa	7–0	26–0	2013 Women's Oceania Cup
6.	2 November 2013	Stratford, New Zealand	Samoa	16–0	26–0	2013 Women's Oceania Cup
7.	2 November 2013	Stratford, New Zealand	Samoa	17–0	26–0	2013 Women's Oceania Cup
8.	2 November 2013	Stratford, New Zealand	Samoa	20–0	26–0	2013 Women's Oceania Cup
9.	20 November 2013	Santiago, Chile	Chile	3–?	6–2	Test match
10.	14 February 2014	Chula Vista, United States	Great Britain	1–0	1–0	Test match
11.	17 February 2014	Chula Vista, United States	United States	1–0	2–1	Test match
12.	29 March 2014	Auckland, New Zealand	South Korea	2–1	3–4	Test match
13.	29 March 2014	Auckland, New Zealand	South Korea	3–3	3–4	Test match
14.	5 April 2014	Hastings, New Zealand	South Korea	3–0	3–1	2014 Hawke's Bay Cup
15.	12 July 2014	Dublin, Ireland	Ireland	7–2	9–2	2014 Women's Four Nations Hockey Tournament
16.	12 July 2014	Dublin, Ireland	Ireland	8–2	9–2	2014 Women's Four Nations Hockey Tournament
17.	13 July 2014	Dublin, Ireland	Chile	2–0	10–0	2014 Women's Four Nations Hockey Tournament
18.	13 July 2014	Dublin, Ireland	Chile	5–0	10–0	2014 Women's Four Nations Hockey Tournament
19.	15 July 2014	Dublin, Ireland	Canada	3–0	7–0	2014 Women's Four Nations Hockey Tournament
20.	15 July 2014	Dublin, Ireland	Canada	4–0	7–0	2014 Women's Four Nations Hockey Tournament
21.	18 November 2014	Wellington, New Zealand	Australia	2–0	3–3	Test match
22.	29 November 2014	Mendoza, Argentina	Japan	1–0	2–1	2014 Women's Hockey Champions Trophy
23.	30 November 2014	Mendoza, Argentina	Netherlands	1–1	1–1	2014 Women's Hockey Champions Trophy
24.	5 February 2015	Whangārei, New Zealand	Canada	3–1	4–1	Test match
25.	4 April 2015	Auckland, New Zealand	South Korea	2–2	3–2	Test match
26.	7 April 2015	Gisborne, New Zealand	Argentina	1–0	1–0	Test match
27.	12 April 2015	Hastings, New Zealand	Argentina	3–1	3–2	2015 Hawke's Bay Cup
28.	14 April 2015	Hastings, New Zealand	South Korea	1–0	2–1	2015 Hawke's Bay Cup
29.	16 April 2015	Hastings, New Zealand	India	2–1	4–1	2015 Hawke's Bay Cup
30.	16 April 2015	Hastings, New Zealand	India	3–1	4–1	2015 Hawke's Bay Cup
31.	18 April 2015	Hastings, New Zealand	South Korea	1–0	4–0	2015 Hawke's Bay Cup
32.	19 April 2015	Hastings, New Zealand	Australia	2–2	2–3	2015 Hawke's Bay Cup
33.	20 June 2015	Antwerp, Belgium	Poland	5–0	12–0	2014–15 Women's FIH Hockey World League Semifinals
34.	20 June 2015	Antwerp, Belgium	Poland	11–0	12–0	2014–15 Women's FIH Hockey World League Semifinals
35.	23 June 2015	Antwerp, Belgium	India	2–0	5–0	2014–15 Women's FIH Hockey World League Semifinals
36.	4 October 2015	Blenheim, New Zealand	Argentina	3–2	3–2	Test match
37.	6 October 2015	Nelson, New Zealand	Argentina	3–1	4–1	Test match
38.	21 October 2015	Stratford, New Zealand	Samoa	23–0	31–0	2015 Women's Oceania Cup
39.	21 October 2015	Stratford, New Zealand	Samoa	26–0	31–0	2015 Women's Oceania Cup
40.	24 October 2015	Stratford, New Zealand	Australia	2–1	2–2	2015 Women's Oceania Cup
41.	10 December 2015	Rosario, Argentina	Great Britain	2–1	2–1	2014–15 Women's FIH Hockey World League Final
42.	23 February 2016	Mar del Plata, Argentina	Argentina	1–0	2–2	Test match
43.	1 March 2016	Mar del Plata, Argentina	Argentina	1–1	2–1	Test match
44.	27 March 2016	Hamilton, New Zealand	Canada	1–0	6–0	Test match
45.	27 March 2016	Hamilton, New Zealand	Canada	6–0	6–0	Test match
46.	2 April 2016	Hastings, New Zealand	India	1–0	1–0	2016 Hawke's Bay Cup
47.	7 April 2016	Hastings, New Zealand	South Korea	1–0	6–0	2016 Hawke's Bay Cup
48.	9 April 2016	Hastings, New Zealand	Australia	2–2	3–2	2016 Hawke's Bay Cup
49.	10 April 2016	Hastings, New Zealand	Japan	1–0	3–2	2016 Hawke's Bay Cup
50.	1 June 2016	Darwin, Australia	India	1–0	1–2	2016 Women's International Hockey Open
51.	4 June 2016	Darwin, Australia	Australia	2–0	2–0	2016 Women's International Hockey Open
52.	23 June 2016	London, United Kingdom	Argentina	2–4	2–4	2016 Women's Hockey Champions Trophy
53.	25 June 2016	London, United Kingdom	United States	1–1	1–1	2016 Women's Hockey Champions Trophy
54.	26 June 2016	London, United Kingdom	Great Britain	2–3	3–4	2016 Women's Hockey Champions Trophy
55.	13 August 2016	Rio de Janeiro, Brazil	China	1–0	3–0	2016 Summer Olympics
56.	15 August 2016	Rio de Janeiro, Brazil	Australia	4–1	4–2	2016 Summer Olympics
57.	19 August 2016	Rio de Janeiro, Brazil	Germany	1–2	1–2	2016 Summer Olympics
58.	19 November 2016	Auckland, New Zealand	Australia	1–0	2–0	2016 Trans-Tasman Trophy
59.	20 November 2016	Auckland, New Zealand	Australia	3–1	3–2	2016 Trans-Tasman Trophy
60.	14 February 2017	Buenos Aires, Argentina	Argentina	1–0	1–0	Test match
61.	17 February 2017	Buenos Aires, Argentina	Argentina	2–0	2–2	Test match
62.	26 March 2017	Christchurch, New Zealand	United States	1–2	3–2	Test match
63.	9 April 2017	Hastings, New Zealand	Japan	3–0	3–0	2017 Hawke's Bay Cup
64.	14 May 2017	Pukekohe, New Zealand	India	2–0	4–1	Test match
65.	20 May 2017	Hastings, New Zealand	India	1–0	6–2	Test match
66.	20 May 2017	Hastings, New Zealand	India	2–0	6–2	Test match
67.	21 June 2017	Brussels, Belgium	Spain	1–0	1–0	2016–17 Women's FIH Hockey World League Semifinals
68.	27 June 2017	Brussels, Belgium	Malaysia	1–0	1–0	2016–17 Women's FIH Hockey World League Semifinals
69.	11 October 2017	Sydney, Australia	Papua New Guinea	6–0	33–0	2017 Women's Oceania Cup
70.	11 October 2017	Sydney, Australia	Papua New Guinea	11–0	33–0	2017 Women's Oceania Cup
71.	11 October 2017	Sydney, Australia	Papua New Guinea	22–0	33–0	2017 Women's Oceania Cup
72.	11 October 2017	Sydney, Australia	Papua New Guinea	23–0	33–0	2017 Women's Oceania Cup
73.	11 October 2017	Sydney, Australia	Papua New Guinea	26–0	33–0	2017 Women's Oceania Cup
74.	11 October 2017	Sydney, Australia	Papua New Guinea	32–0	33–0	2017 Women's Oceania Cup
75.	11 October 2017	Sydney, Australia	Papua New Guinea	33–0	33–0	2017 Women's Oceania Cup
76.	14 October 2017	Sydney, Australia	Australia	1–2	1–2	2017 Women's Oceania Cup
77.	24 November 2017	Auckland, New Zealand	England	1–0	1–0	2016–17 Women's FIH Hockey World League Final
78.	6 April 2018	Gold Coast, Australia	Ghana	6–0	12–0	2018 Commonwealth Games
79.	14 April 2018	Gold Coast, Australia	Australia	3–0	4–1	2018 Commonwealth Games
80.	20 May 2018	Cromwell, New Zealand	Australia	1–1	1–4	2018 Women's Tri-Nations Hockey Tournament
81.	22 May 2018	Cromwell, New Zealand	Japan	2–0	4–1	2018 Women's Tri-Nations Hockey Tournament
82.	26 May 2018	Cromwell, New Zealand	Japan	3–3	3–3 (2–0 p)	2018 Women's Tri-Nations Hockey Tournament
83.	22 July 2018	London, England	Belgium	3–2	4–2	2018 Women's Hockey World Cup
84.	22 July 2018	London, England	Belgium	4–2	4–2	2018 Women's Hockey World Cup
85.	26 July 2018	London, England	Australia	1–0	1–1	2018 Women's Hockey World Cup
86.	8 February 2019	Christchurch, New Zealand	Great Britain	1–0	5–1	2019 Women's FIH Pro League
87.	8 February 2019	Christchurch, New Zealand	Great Britain	3–1	5–1	2019 Women's FIH Pro League
88.	8 February 2019	Christchurch, New Zealand	Great Britain	4–1	5–1	2019 Women's FIH Pro League
89.	17 February 2019	Christchurch, New Zealand	China	1–0	2–0	2019 Women's FIH Pro League
90.	17 February 2019	Christchurch, New Zealand	China	2–0	2–0	2019 Women's FIH Pro League
91.	8 March 2019	Auckland, New Zealand	United States	1–0	3–1	2019 Women's FIH Pro League
92.	17 March 2019	Sydney, Australia	Australia	1–0	3–1	2019 Women's FIH Pro League
93.	17 March 2019	Sydney, Australia	Australia	2–0	3–1	2019 Women's FIH Pro League
94.	1 June 2019	Lancaster, United States	United States	3–0	3–0	2019 Women's FIH Pro League
95.	12 June 2019	's-Hertogenbosch, Netherlands	Netherlands	1–2	2–3	2019 Women's FIH Pro League
96.	12 June 2019	's-Hertogenbosch, Netherlands	Netherlands	2–2	2–3	2019 Women's FIH Pro League
97.	16 June 2019	Antwerp, Belgium	Belgium	1–0	3–0	2019 Women's FIH Pro League
98.	16 June 2019	Antwerp, Belgium	Belgium	2–0	3–0	2019 Women's FIH Pro League
99.	16 June 2019	Antwerp, Belgium	Belgium	3–0	3–0	2019 Women's FIH Pro League
100.	23 June 2019	London, Great Britain	Great Britain	1–3	1–3	2019 Women's FIH Pro League
101.	7 September 2019	Rockhampton, Australia	Australia	1–1	2–3	2019 Women's Oceania Cup
102.	8 September 2019	Rockhampton, Australia	Australia	1–1	1–1	2019 Women's Oceania Cup
103.	2 February 2020	Auckland, New Zealand	Belgium	1–1	4–1	2020–21 Women's FIH Pro League
104.	2 February 2020	Auckland, New Zealand	Belgium	2–1	4–1	2020–21 Women's FIH Pro League
105.	2 February 2020	Auckland, New Zealand	Belgium	3–1	4–1	2020–21 Women's FIH Pro League
106.	2 February 2020	Auckland, New Zealand	Belgium	4–1	4–1	2020–21 Women's FIH Pro League
107.	15 February 2020	Christchurch, New Zealand	United States	1–0	3–1	2020–21 Women's FIH Pro League
108.	16 February 2020	Christchurch, New Zealand	United States	1–0	3–1	2020–21 Women's FIH Pro League
109.	1 March 2020	Christchurch, New Zealand	Argentina	1–0	5–3	2020–21 Women's FIH Pro League
110.	1 March 2020	Christchurch, New Zealand	Argentina	2–0	5–3	2020–21 Women's FIH Pro League
111.	1 March 2020	Christchurch, New Zealand	Argentina	3–0	5–3	2020–21 Women's FIH Pro League
112.	1 March 2020	Christchurch, New Zealand	Argentina	5–3	5–3	2020–21 Women's FIH Pro League
113.	1 June 2021	Palmerston North, New Zealand	Australia	1–2	1–3	2021 Women's Trans-Tasman Hockey Series
114.	27 June 2021	Perth, Australia	Australia	1–0	1–3	2020–21 Women's FIH Pro League
115.	26 July 2021	Tokyo, Japan	Japan	1–1	2–1	2020 Summer Olympics
116.	2 July 2022	Amstelveen, Netherlands	China	2–2	2–2	2022 Women's FIH Hockey World Cup
117.	7 July 2022	Amstelveen, Netherlands	India	1–1	4–3	2022 Women's FIH Hockey World Cup
118.	7 July 2022	Amstelveen, Netherlands	India	4–2	4–3	2022 Women's FIH Hockey World Cup
119.	29 July 2022	Birmingham, England	Kenya	15–0	16–0	2022 Commonwealth Games
120.	29 July 2022	Birmingham, England	Kenya	16–0	16–0	2022 Commonwealth Games
121.	7 August 2022	Birmingham, England	India	1–1	1–1 (1–2 p)	2022 Commonwealth Games
122.	26 February 2023	Wellington, New Zealand	China	1–1	2–5	2022–23 Women's FIH Pro League
123.	30 April 2023	Christchurch, New Zealand	Australia	1–0	1–2	2022–23 Women's FIH Pro League
124.	27 June 2023	Amsterdam, Netherlands	Netherlands	1–3	1–7	2022–23 Women's FIH Pro League
125.	19 January 2024	Ranchi, India	Italy	2–1	3–1	2024 Women's FIH Hockey Olympic Qualifiers
