= Women's Oceania Cup =

International field hockey tournament

- Current season, competition or edition: 2025 Women's Oceania Cup
- Sport: Field hockey
- Founded: 1999; 27 years ago
- First season: 1999
- No. of teams: 2–4
- Confederation: OHF (Oceania)
- Most recent champion: New Zealand (5th title) (2025)
- Most titles: Australia (8 titles)

The Women's Oceania Cup is an international field hockey competition organised by Oceania Hockey Federation (OHF). It is held every two years to determine which teams will receive an automatic berth to the FIH World Cup and the Summer Olympics.

As of 2023, only Australia and New Zealand have reached the finals.

== History ==
The Oceania Cup was introduced to international hockey in 1999. The first tournament was used as the Oceania qualifier for the 2000 Summer Olympics. Since its inception, the tournament has been held biennially.

Hosting rights for the tournament generally switch between Hockey Australia and the New Zealand Hockey Federation each tournament.

Australia are the most successful team, having won the title eight times.

== Results ==
=== Summaries ===
Year	Hosts	Gold Medal Match			Bronze Medal Match		
Year	Hosts	Champions	Score	Runners-up	3rd place	Score	4th place
1999; Details	Sydney, Australia; Dunedin, New Zealand	Australia	Round-Robin	New Zealand	Only two teams.		
2001; Details	Auckland, Hamilton and Wellington, New Zealand	Australia	Round-Robin	New Zealand	Only two teams.		
2003; Details	Melbourne, Australia; Auckland and Whangārei, New Zealand	Australia	Round-Robin	New Zealand	Only two teams.		
2005; Details	Sydney, Australia; Auckland, New Zealand	Australia	Round-Robin	New Zealand	Only two teams.		
2007; Details	Buderim, Australia	New Zealand	1–0	Australia	Fiji	6–0	Papua New Guinea
2009; Details	Invercargill, New Zealand	New Zealand	2–2 (1–0 pen.)	Australia	Samoa	Only three teams.	
2011; Details	Hobart, Australia	New Zealand	Round-Robin	Australia	Only two teams.		
2013; Details	Stratford, New Zealand	Australia	2–2 (5–4 pen.)	New Zealand	Samoa	0–0 (4–3 pen.)	Papua New Guinea
2015; Details	Stratford, New Zealand	Australia	1–1 (2–1 pen.)	New Zealand	Samoa	Only three teams.	
2017; Details	Sydney, Australia	Australia	2–0	New Zealand	Papua New Guinea	Only three teams.	
2019; Details	Rockhampton, Australia	New Zealand	Round-Robin	Australia	Only two teams.		
2023; Details	Whangārei, New Zealand	Australia	Round-Robin	New Zealand	Only two teams.		
2025; Details	Darwin, Australia	New Zealand	1–1 (a.g.); 5–3 (pen.)	Australia	Only two teams.		

=== Medal table ===
Rank	Nation	Gold	Silver	Bronze	Total
1	Australia	8	5	0	13
2	New Zealand	5	8	0	13
3	Samoa	0	0	3	3
4	Fiji	0	0	1	1
4	Papua New Guinea	0	0	1	1
Totals (5 entries)		13	13	5	31

=== Team appearances ===
Team	(Australia) (New Zealand) 1999	(New Zealand) 2001	(Australia) (New Zealand) 2003	(Australia) (New Zealand) 2005	(Australia) 2007	(New Zealand) 2009	(Australia) 2011	(New Zealand) 2013	(New Zealand) 2015	(Australia) 2017	(Australia) 2019	(New Zealand) 2023	(Australia) 2025	Total
Australia	1st	1st	1st	1st	2nd	2nd	2nd	1st	1st	1st	2nd	1st	2nd	13
Fiji	–	–	–	–	3rd	–	–	–	–	–	–	–	–	1
New Zealand	2nd	2nd	2nd	2nd	1st	1st	1st	2nd	2nd	2nd	1st	2nd	1st	13
Papua New Guinea	–	–	–	–	4th	–	–	4th	–	3rd	–	–	–	3
Samoa	–	–	–	–	–	3rd	–	3rd	3rd	–	–	–	–	3
Total	2	2	2	2	4	3	2	4	3	3	2	2	2	

== Statistics ==
=== All-Time Table ===
Table
Pos	Team	Pld	W	D	L	GF	GA	GD	Pts	PCT
1	Australia	41	27	8	6	215	37	+178	89	72.3
2	Fiji	4	2	0	2	12	29	–17	6	50.0
3	New Zealand	41	13	8	20	208	72	+136	47	38.2
4	Papua New Guinea	10	1	1	8	3	161	–158	4	13.3
5	Samoa	8	0	1	7	1	140	–139	1	4.2

=== All-Time Scorers ===
There were 439 goals scored in 52 matches, for an average of 8.44 goals per match.

17 goals

- (Australia) Ashleigh Nelson
- (New Zealand) Olivia Merry

14 goals

- (Australia) Emily Chalker
- (New Zealand) Charlotte Harrison

13 goals

- (New Zealand) Gemma Flynn
- (New Zealand) Anita Punt

12 goals

- (Australia) Madonna Blyth

11 goals

- (Australia) Brooke Peris
- (Australia) Kellie White
- (New Zealand) Krystal Forgesson
- (New Zealand) Kayla Sharland
- (New Zealand) Petrea Webster

10 goals

- (New Zealand) Sophie Cocks
- (New Zealand) Samantha Harrison

8 goals

- (Australia) Jodie Kenny
- (Australia) Angela Lambert

7 goals

- (Australia) Alyson Annan
- (Australia) Casey Eastham
- (Australia) Anna Flanagan
- (Australia) Claire Messent
- (Australia) Katrina Powell
- (New Zealand) Jaimee Claxton
- (New Zealand) Rachel McCann
- (New Zealand) Kirsten Pearce
- (New Zealand) Elizabeth Thompson

6 goals

- (Australia) Madison Fitzpatrick
- (Australia) Kathryn Slattery

5 goals

- (Australia) Jane Claxton
- (Australia) Nicole Hudson
- (Australia) Georgina Parker
- (Fiji) Emelina Semisi
- (Fiji) Catherine Thaggard
- (New Zealand) Caryn Paewai

4 goals

- (Australia) Nicole Arrold
- (Australia) Kate Hollywood
- (Australia) Megan Rivers
- (Australia) Grace Stewart
- (New Zealand) Samantha Charlton
- (New Zealand) Honor Dillon
- (New Zealand) Elizabeth Igasan
- (New Zealand) Rose Keddell
- (New Zealand) Julia King

3 goals

- (Australia) Teneal Attard
- (Australia) Laura Barden
- (Australia) Jordyn Holzberger
- (Australia) Hope Munro
- (Australia) Karen Smith
- (Australia) Renee Taylor
- (Australia) Mariah Williams
- (Australia) Sarah Young
- (New Zealand) Shiloh Gloyn
- (New Zealand) Katie Glynn
- (New Zealand) Pippa Hayward
- (New Zealand) Stacey Michelsen

2 goals

- (Australia) Kristina Bates
- (Australia) Emily Halliday
- (Australia) Ambrosia Malone
- (Australia) Gabrielle Nance
- (Australia) Rebecca Sanders
- (Australia) Julie Towers
- (New Zealand) Clarissa Eshuis
- (New Zealand) Elizabeth Gunson
- (New Zealand) Emily Naylor
- (New Zealand) Meredith Orr
- (New Zealand) Suzanne Pearce
- (New Zealand) Niniwa Roberts
- (New Zealand) Amy Robinson
- (New Zealand) Kate Saunders
- (Papua New Guinea) Kari Raurela

1 goal

- (Australia) Wendy Alcorn
- (Australia) Joanne Banning
- (Australia) Edwina Bone
- (Australia) Claire Colwill
- (Australia) Louise Dobson
- (Australia) Suzanne Faulkner
- (Australia) Peta Gallagher
- (Australia) Kate Hanna
- (Australia) Juliet Haslam
- (Australia) Rechelle Hawkes
- (Australia) Stephanie Kershaw
- (Australia) Amy Lawton
- (Australia) Morgan Mathison
- (Australia) Karri McMahon
- (Australia) Georgina Morgan
- (Australia) Kaitlin Nobbs
- (Australia) Courtney Schonell
- (Australia) Ngaire Smith
- (Fiji) Emi Nawaqakuta
- (Fiji) Rita Taito
- (New Zealand) Bridget Blackwood
- (New Zealand) Stacey Carr
- (New Zealand) Hannah Cotter
- (New Zealand) Frances Davies
- (New Zealand) Rhiannon Dennison
- (New Zealand) Natasha FitzSimons
- (New Zealand) Hannah Gravenall
- (New Zealand) Megan Hull
- (New Zealand) Penny Munns
- (New Zealand) Brooke Neal
- (New Zealand) Kimberley Noakes
- (New Zealand) Hope Ralph
- (New Zealand) Olivia Shannon
- (New Zealand) Lucy Talbot
- (New Zealand) Kim Tanner
- (New Zealand) Anna Thorpe
- (New Zealand) Carol Ward
- (Papua New Guinea) Monica Evans
- (Samoa) Sharlene Fagalilo

2 own goals

- Papua New Guinea (against Australia)

== See also ==
- Field hockey at the Pacific Games
- Men's Oceania Cup
