= 2016 Trans-Tasman Trophy =

Tournament details
- Host country: New Zealand
- City: Auckland, New Zealand
- Dates: 17–20 November
- Teams: 2
- Venue: Lloyd Elsmore Hockey Stadium

Final positions
- Champions: Australia
- Runner-up: New Zealand

Tournament statistics
- Matches played: 6
- Goals scored: 25 (4.17 per match)

The 2016 Trans-Tasman Trophy was a field hockey tournament contested by men's and women's field hockey teams from Australia and New Zealand. The tournament was held in the New Zealand city of Auckland, at the Lloyd Elsmore Hockey Stadium.

At the conclusion of the tournament, results from the men's and women's tournament were combined to determine the winning country. Australia won the 2016 Trans-Tasman Trophy, after defeating New Zealand on aggregate scores.

== Results ==
=== Men's Competition ===
Pos	Team	Pld	W	D	L	GF	GA	GD	Pts
1	Australia	3	2	0	1	7	5	+2	6
2	New Zealand (H)	3	1	0	2	5	7	−2	3

Source: FIH
Rules for classification: 1) points; 2) goal difference; 3) games won. ; 4) head-to-head result.
(H) Hosts

17 November 2016
20:00

New Zealand	2–4	Australia
Jenness 12'; Kingstone 20'	Report	Kleinschmidt 18'; Mitton 42'; Zalewski 50'; Hayward 56'

Umpires:
Simon Taylor (NZL)
Stephen Versteegh (AUS)

19 November 2016
18:30

New Zealand	1–2	Australia
Kingstone 35'	Report	Beale 17'; Bausor 25'

Umpires:
Bevan Nichol (NZL)
Stephen Versteegh (AUS)

17 November 2016
16:30

New Zealand	2–1	Australia
Jenness 3'; Lane 48'	Report	Hayward 49'

Umpires:
Simon Taylor (NZL)
Stephen Versteegh (AUS)

=== Women's Competition ===
Pos	Team	Pld	W	D	L	GF	GA	GD	Pts
1	New Zealand (H)	3	2	0	1	5	8	−3	6
2	Australia	3	1	0	2	8	5	+3	3

Source: FIH
Rules for classification: 1) points; 2) goal difference; 3) games won. ; 4) head-to-head result.
(H) Hosts

17 November 2016
18:30

New Zealand	0–6	Australia
	Report	Commerford 17'; Slattery 33', 55'; Morgan 40'; Nanscawen 44'; Fey 48'

Umpires:
Kerryl Chandler (AUS)
Melanie Oakden (NZL)

19 November 2016
20:00

New Zealand	2–0	Australia
Merry 24'; McCann 27'	Report

Umpires:
Katrina Woolf (NZL)
Kerryl Chandler (AUS)

17 November 2016
18:00

New Zealand	3–2	Australia
Pearce 3'; Harrison 19'; Merry 48'	Report	Morgan 32'; Peris 54'

Umpires:
Melanie Oakden (NZL)
Kerryl Chandler (AUS)

== Statistics ==
=== Final standings ===
Results from the men's and women's competitions were combined to determine the champions.

Pos	Team	Pld	W	D	L	GF	GA	GD	Pts
1	Australia	6	3	0	3	15	10	+5	9
2	New Zealand	6	3	0	3	10	15	−5	9

Source: FIH

=== Goalscorers ===
==== Men ====
2 Goals

- (Australia) Jeremy Hayward
- (New Zealand) Stephen Jenness
- (New Zealand) Kim Kingstone

1 Goal

- (Australia) Chris Bausor
- (Australia) Daniel Beale
- (Australia) Aaron Kleinschmidt
- (Australia) Trent Mitton
- (Australia) Aran Zalewski
- (New Zealand) Sam Lane

==== Women ====
2 Goals

- (Australia) Georgina Morgan
- (Australia) Kathryn Slattery
- (New Zealand) Olivia Merry

1 Goal

- (Australia) Kalindi Commerford
- (Australia) Ashlea Fey
- (Australia) Georgia Nanscawen
- (Australia) Brooke Peris
- (New Zealand) Samantha Harrison
- (New Zealand) Rachel McCann
- (New Zealand) Kirsten Pearce
