= 1999 Women's Oceania Cup =

Field hockey tournament

1999 Oceania Cup
Tournament details
- Host country: Australia; New Zealand
- Dates: 8–12 September
- Venue: 2 (in 2 host cities)

Final positions
- Champions: Australia (1st title)
- Runner-up: New Zealand

Tournament statistics
- Matches played: 3
- Goals scored: 7 (2.33 per match)
- Top scorer: (Australia) Alyson Annan (3 goals)

The 1999 Women's Oceania Cup was the inaugural edition of the women's field hockey tournament. It was held from 8 to 12 September in Sydney and Dunedin.

The tournament served as a qualifier for the 2000 Summer Olympics.

Australia won the tournament for the first time, defeating New Zealand in the three–game series, 3–0. However, as Australia had already qualified for the Summer Olympics as the host nation, the entry quota was added to the Olympic Qualification Tournament.

== Results ==
=== Pool ===
Pos	Team	Pld	W	D	L	GF	GA	GD	Pts	Qualification
1	Australia	3	3	0	0	7	0	+7	9	2000 Summer Olympics
2	New Zealand	3	0	0	3	0	7	−7	0	

Source: Clearing House
Rules for classification: 1) points; 2) goal difference; 3) goals scored; 4) head-to-head result.

=== Fixtures ===
8 September 1999
19:00 (NZST)

New Zealand	0–1	Australia
	Report	Annan 9'

Otago Hockey Association, Dunedin
Umpires:
Gina Spitaleri (ITA)
Kazuko Yasueda (JPN)

11 September 1999
13:00 (AEST)

Australia	2–0	New Zealand
Hawkes 43'; Powell 68'	Report

State Hockey Centre, Sydney
Umpires:
Kazuko Yasueda (JPN)
Gina Spitaleri (ITA)

12 September 1999
13:00 (AEST)

Australia	4–0	New Zealand
Annan 12', 22'; Haslam 37'; Powell 65'	Report

State Hockey Centre, Sydney
Umpires:
Gina Spitaleri (ITA)
Kazuko Yasueda (JPN)

== Statistics ==
=== Final standings ===
1. Australia
2. New Zealand

=== Goalscorers ===
There were 7 goals scored in 3 matches, for an average of 2.33 goals per match.

3 goals

- (Australia) Alyson Annan

2 goals

- (Australia) Katrina Powell

1 goal

- (Australia) Juliet Haslam
- (Australia) Rechelle Hawkes

Source: Hockey Australia
