= 2009 Women's Oceania Cup =

Field hockey tournament

2009 Oceania Cup
Tournament details
- Host country: New Zealand
- City: Invercargill
- Dates: 25–29 August
- Venue: Hockey Southland

Final positions
- Champions: New Zealand (2nd title)
- Runner-up: Australia
- Third place: Samoa

Tournament statistics
- Matches played: 4
- Goals scored: 40 (10 per match)
- Top scorer: (Australia) Ashleigh Nelson (6 goals)

The 2009 Women's Oceania Cup was the sixth edition of the women's field hockey tournament. It was held from 25 to 29 August in Invercargill.

The tournament served as a qualifier for the 2010 FIH World Cup.

New Zealand won the tournament for the second time, defeating Australia 4–3 in penalties after the final finished as a 2–2 draw.

== Teams ==
- Australia
- New Zealand
- Samoa

== Results ==
All times are local (NZST).

=== Preliminary round ===
==== Pool ====
Pos	Team	Pld	W	D	L	GF	GA	GD	Pts	Qualification
1	Australia	2	2	0	0	18	1	+17	6	Advanced to Final
2	New Zealand (H)	2	1	0	1	18	2	+16	3	Advanced to Final
3	Samoa	2	0	0	2	0	33	−33	0	

Source: Hockey Australia
Rules for classification: 1) points; 2) goal difference; 3) goals scored; 4) head-to-head result.
(H) Hosts

==== Fixtures ====
25 August 2009
15:15

Australia	16–0	Samoa
Hollywood 1', 47'; Arrold 9', 12'; Messent 10', 14', 25'; Nelson 19', 21', 30', 32', 52'; Blyth 21', 69'; Munro 26'; Eastham 65'	Report

Umpires:
Corinne Cornelius (RSA)
Dawn Henning (ENG)

26 August 2009
13:15

New Zealand	1–2	Australia
C. Harrison 14'	Report	Arrold 2'; Nelson 4'

Umpires:
Dawn Henning (ENG)
Corinne Cornelius (RSA)

27 August 2009
15:15

Samoa	0–17	New Zealand
	Report	Flynn 2', 19', 23', 50', 67'; Glynn 5', 18'; Sharland 12', 41'; Carr 14'; Forgesson 22'; Thorpe 29'; Talbot 36'; C. Harrison 38', 64'; Michelsen 57'; Punt 60'

Umpires:
Corinne Cornelius (RSA)
Dawn Henning (ENG)

=== Classification ===
==== Final ====
29 August 2009
13:15

Australia	2–2	New Zealand
Eastham 21'; Rivers 46'	Report	Eshuis 48'; Sharland 57'
Penalties
Nelson (penalty shoot-out missed); Rivers (penalty shoot-out scored); Blyth (penalty shoot-out scored); Arrold (penalty shoot-out scored); Eastham (penalty shoot-out missed)	3–4	(penalty shoot-out scored) Glynn; (penalty shoot-out missed) Forgesson; (penalty shoot-out scored) Eshuis; (penalty shoot-out scored) Sharland; (penalty shoot-out scored) Michelsen

Umpires:
Dawn Henning (ENG)
Corinne Cornelius (RSA)

== Statistics ==
=== Final standings ===
As per statistical convention in field hockey, matches decided in extra time are counted as wins and losses, while matches decided by penalty shoot-outs are counted as draws.

Pos	Team	Pld	W	D	L	GF	GA	GD	Pts	Status
1st place, gold medalist(s)	New Zealand (H)	3	1	1	1	20	4	+16	4	Qualified for 2010 FIH World Cup
2nd place, silver medalist(s)	Australia	3	2	1	0	20	3	+17	7	
3rd place, bronze medalist(s)	Samoa	2	0	0	2	0	33	−33	0	

Source: Hockey Australia
(H) Hosts

=== Goalscorers ===
There were 40 goals scored in 4 matches, for an average of 10 goals per match.

6 goals

- (Australia) Ashleigh Nelson

5 goals

- (New Zealand) Gemma Flynn

3 goals

- (Australia) Nicole Arrold
- (Australia) Claire Messent
- (New Zealand) Charlotte Harrison
- (New Zealand) Kayla Sharland

2 goals

- (Australia) Madonna Blyth
- (Australia) Casey Eastham
- (Australia) Kate Hollywood
- (New Zealand) Katie Glynn

1 goal

- (Australia) Hope Munro
- (Australia) Megan Rivers
- (New Zealand) Stacey Carr
- (New Zealand) Clarissa Eshuis
- (New Zealand) Krystal Forgesson
- (New Zealand) Stacey Michelsen
- (New Zealand) Anita Punt
- (New Zealand) Lucy Talbot
- (New Zealand) Anna Thorpe
