= Jane Claxton =

Australian field hockey player (born 1992)

Personal information
- Full name: Jane-Anne Claxton
- Born: 26 October 1992 (age 33) Adelaide, Australia
- Height: 1.69 m (5 ft 7 in)
- Weight: 60 kg (132 lb)

Sport
- Sport: Field hockey
- Position: Midfielder
- Club: Adelaide Fire
National team
Years	Team	Caps	Goals
2013–	Australia	245	(21)
Medal record
Women's field hockey
Representing Australia
World Cup
Silver medal – second place	2014 The Hague
Bronze medal – third place	2022 Terrassa/Amstelveen
Commonwealth Games
Gold medal – first place	2014 Glasgow	Team
Silver medal – second place	2018 Gold Coast	Team
Silver medal – second place	2022 Birmingham	Team
FIH Pro League
Silver medal – second place	2019
Bronze medal – third place	2022–23
Champions Trophy
Silver medal – second place	2018 Changzhou
World League
Silver medal – second place	2012–13 Tucumán	Team
Oceania Cup
Gold medal – first place	2013 Stratford
Gold medal – first place	2015 Stratford
Gold medal – first place	2017 Sydney
Gold medal – first place	2023 Whangārei
Silver medal – second place	2019 Rockhampton

Jane Claxton (born 26 October 1992) is an Australian field hockey player for Australia. Claxton was a member of the Australia women's national field hockey team that were defeated by the Netherlands women's national field hockey team in the final of the 2014 Women's Hockey World Cup, a Gold Medal winner at the 2014 Commonwealth Games and member of the team that went to the 2016 Summer Olympics. She was also named captain of the Hockeyroos in November 2016 for the Trans-Tasman Trophy against New Zealand.

== Playing career ==
=== Club hockey ===
Claxton played club hockey in Adelaide for the Burnside Bulldogs. Whilst living in Perth, she plays for Victoria Park Xavier Panthers (VPX) Premier League Women's competition.

=== State hockey ===
Claxton played state representative hockey for South Australia in Under 12 (SAPSASA), Under 13, Under 15, Under 16(Secondary Schools), Under 18 and Under 21. In 2012, Claxton was Player of the Tournament at the U21 Women's National Hockey Championships where South Australia finished 2nd.

She has played eight years (2009–2016) in the Australian Hockey League including two years as Captain in 2015 and 2016.

In 2011, Claxton was a member of the Australian Hockey League team the SA Suns that won the national championship. She was Player of the Tournament at the 2015 Australian Hockey League held in Sydney.

=== International hockey ===
Claxton has played over 200 international games for the Hockeyroos, including the Commonwealth Games, Olympic Games and World Cup.

Her tournaments include:

- 2013 – World League Semi-final (London, England) – 1st
- 2013 – Women's Hockey Junior World Cup (Mönchengladbach, Germany) – 6th
- 2013 – Oceania Cup (Stratford, New Zealand) – 1st
- 2013 – World League Finals (Tucuman, Argentina) – 2nd
- 2014 – Women's Hockey World Cup (The Hague, Netherlands) – 2nd
- 2014 – Commonwealth Games (Glasgow, Scotland) – 1st
- 2015 – World League Semi-final (Antwerp, Belgium) – 3rd
- 2015 – Oceania Cup (Stratford, New Zealand) – 1st
- 2015 – World League Finals (Rosario, Argentina) – 6th
- 2016 – Champions Trophy (London, Great Britain) – 4th
- 2016 – Rio Summer Olympics – quarter finals

Claxton captained the Hockeyroos in November 2016 for the Trans-Tasman Trophy against New Zealand.

Claxton qualified for the Tokyo 2020 Olympics. She was part of the Hockeyroos Olympics squad. The Hockeyroos lost 1-0 to India in the quarterfinals and therefore were not in medal contention.

=== International goals ===
Goal	Date	Location	Opponent	Score	Result	Competition	Ref.
1	31 October 2013	TET MultiSports Centre, Stratford, New Zealand	Samoa	3–0	23–0	2013 Oceania Cup	
2	2 November 2013	TET MultiSports Centre, Stratford, New Zealand	PNG	26–0	26–0	2013 Oceania Cup	
3	21 March 2014	Eastern Goldfields Hockey Association, Kalgoorlie, Australia	Japan	5–1	6–1	Test match	
4	12 April 2014	Hawke's Bay Sports Park, Hastings, New Zealand	New Zealand	3–1	4–2	2014 Hawke's Bay Cup	
5	20 May 2014	Royal Beerschot Hockey Club, Kontich, Belgium	Belgium	1–0	3–1	Test match	
6	1 August 2014	Glasgow National Hockey Centre, Glasgow, Scotland	South Africa	5–0	7–1	2014 Commonwealth Games	
7	4 July 2015	KHC Dragons, Antwerp, Belgium	New Zealand	2–0	4–2	2014–15 HWL Semi-finals	
8	22 October 2015	TET MultiSports Centre, Stratford, New Zealand	Samoa	6–0	25–0	2015 Oceania Cup	
9	22 October 2015	TET MultiSports Centre, Stratford, New Zealand	Samoa	24–0	25–0	2015 Oceania Cup	
10	10 August 2016	Olympic Hockey Centre, Rio de Janeiro, Brazil	India	3–0	6–1	2016 Summer Olympics	
11	4 April 2017	Hawke's Bay Sports Park, Hastings, New Zealand	United States	1–0	3–1	2017 Hawke's Bay Cup	
12	15 October 2017	Sydney Olympic Park, Sydney, Australia	New Zealand	1–0	2–0	2017 Oceania Cup	
13	9 November 2017	State Netball and Hockey Centre, Melbourne, Australia	United States	1–2	3–2	2017 IFOH	
14	7 April 2018	Gold Coast Hockey Centre, Gold Coast, Australia	Ghana	3–0	5–0	2018 Commonwealth Games	
15	2 February 2019	State Netball and Hockey Centre, Melbourne, Australia	Netherlands	1–0	1–0	2019 FIH Pro League	
16	9 June 2019	Lee Valley Hockey and Tennis Centre, London, England	Great Britain	3–0	4–2	2019 FIH Pro League	
17	16 June 2019	Crefelder Hockey und Tennis Club, Krefeld, Germany	Germany	1–0	3–1	2019 FIH Pro League	
18	16 June 2019	Crefelder Hockey und Tennis Club, Krefeld, Germany	Germany	2–0	3–1	2019 FIH Pro League	
19	13 February 2023	Sydney Olympic Park, Sydney, Australia	China	1–2	2–2	2022–23 FIH Pro League	
20	29 May 2024	Wilrijkse Plein, Antwerp, Belgium	Belgium	1–0	2–2	2023–24 FIH Pro League	
21	9 June 2024	Lee Valley Hockey and Tennis Centre, London, England	Germany	2–2	2–2	2023–24 FIH Pro League	

== Personal life ==
Claxton lives in Perth, Western Australia, as part of the national training program, having grown up in Adelaide, South Australia. Claxton's older brother, Matthew Claxton, also plays hockey, and has represented South Australia in the Australian Hockey League team the Southern Hotshots and was the Hockey SA Premier League Best and Fairest in 2014.

She represented South Australia in cross country and athletics, competed in district netball, tennis and swimming before settling into hockey as her sport of choice.

== Recognition and awards ==
- 2012 – Player of the Tournament – U21 Women's National Hockey Championships
- 2013 – South Australian Sports Institute Junior Female Athlete of the Year 2013
- 2015 – Australian Hockey League Player of the Tournament
