= Lieselotte Van Lindt =

Belgian field hockey player

Lieselotte Van Lindt (born 10 May 1989 in Tienen) is a Belgian field hockey player. At the 2012 Summer Olympics she competed with the Belgium women's national field hockey team in the women's tournament.
