= Samantha Child =

New Zealand field hockey player

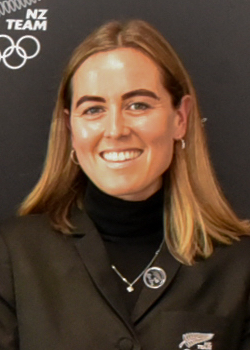
- Child in 2021

Personal information
- Born: 7 December 1991 (age 34) Wellington, New Zealand
- Height: 1.74 m (5 ft 9 in)
- Weight: 66 kg (146 lb)

Sport
- Sport: Field hockey
- Position: Defender
- Club: Midlands
Senior career
| Years | Team | Caps | Goals |
| 2009 | Midlands | - | - |
| 2010 | Canterbury | - | - |
| 2011- | Midlands | - | - |
National team
| Years | Team | Caps | Goals |
| 2010–2024 | New Zealand | 277 | (9) |
Medal record
Representing New Zealand
Women's field hockey
Commonwealth Games
| Gold medal – first place | 2018 Gold Coast | Team |
| Bronze medal – third place | 2014 Glasgow | Team |
Oceania Cup
| Gold medal – first place | 2019 Rockhampton |
| Silver medal – second place | 2017 Sydney |
| Silver medal – second place | 2023 Whangārei |

Samantha Child (née Charlton, born 7 December 1991) is a New Zealand field hockey player. She has competed for the New Zealand women's national field hockey team (the Black Sticks Women), including for the team at the 2012, 2016 and 2020 Summer Olympics.

== Life ==
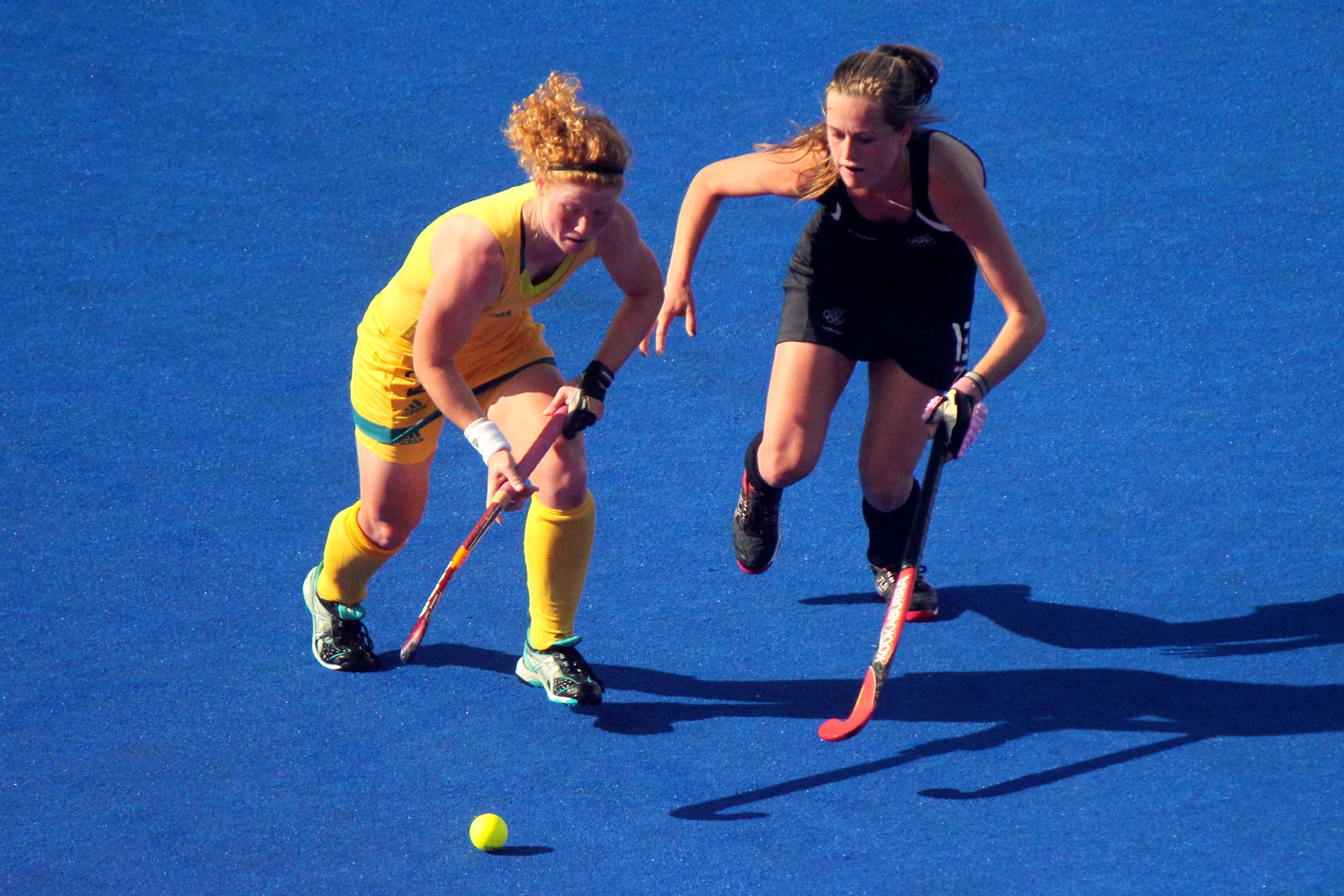
Charlton (right) at the 2012 Summer Olympics

Born in Wellington, Charlton spent most of her formative years living in Tauranga and attended Otumoetai College. As of August 2012, she resides in Auckland, where she is a student at Massey University in Albany.

She was part of the New Zealand teams that won gold at the 2018 Commonwealth Games and bronze at the 2014 Commonwealth Games.

Overall, she competed in more than 250 games for New Zealand.

She married fellow New Zealand hockey player Marcus Child.

She participated at the 2020 Women's FIH Pro League.

== International goals ==
| No. | Date | Venue | Opponent | Score | Result | Competition |
|---|---|---|---|---|---|---|
| 1. | 31 October 2013 | Stratford, New Zealand | Papua New Guinea | 6–0 | 25–0 | 2013 Women's Oceania Cup |
| 2. | 3 November 2013 | Stratford, New Zealand | Samoa | 4–0 | 26–0 | 2013 Women's Oceania Cup |
| 3. | 3 November 2013 | Stratford, New Zealand | Samoa | 25–0 | 26–0 | 2013 Women's Oceania Cup |
| 4. | 11 October 2017 | Sydney, Australia | Papua New Guinea | 30–0 | 33–0 | 2017 Women's Oceania Cup |
| 5. | 6 April 2018 | Gold Coast, Australia | Ghana | 3–0 | 12–0 | 2018 Commonwealth Games |
