= Kirsten Pearce =

New Zealand field hockey player

Personal information
- Nationality: New Zealand
- Born: 10 April 1991 (age 35) Wynberg, Cape Town, South Africa
- Height: 1.62 m (5 ft 4 in)
- Weight: 58 kg (128 lb)

Sport
- Country: New Zealand
- Sport: Field hockey
Medal record
Oceania Cup
Gold medal – first place	2019 Rockhampton

Kirsten Pearce (born 10 April 1991) is a New Zealand field hockey player who has represented her country.

== Personal life ==
Pearce was born in Wynberg, Cape Town, South Africa before moving to New Zealand. She grew up on Auckland's North Shore in New Zealand, before shifting with her family to Australia at a young age. She has dual New Zealand and Australian citizenship.

== Playing career ==
Pearce was an Australian under-21 international before joining the New Zealand side in 2015.

She competed in the 2014–15 Women's FIH Hockey World League Semifinals and Final and represented New Zealand at the 2016 Summer Olympics.
