= Rose Keddell =

New Zealand field hockey player

Personal information
- Born: 31 January 1994 (age 32) Tauranga, New Zealand
- Height: 1.69 m (5 ft 7 in)
- Weight: 67 kg (148 lb)

Sport
- Sport: Field hockey
- Position: Defender
- Club: Midlands
National team
Years	Team	Caps	Goals
2012–	New Zealand	165	(5)
Medal record
Representing New Zealand
Women's field hockey
Commonwealth Games
Gold medal – first place	2018 Gold Coast	Team
Bronze medal – third place	2014 Glasgow	Team
Oceania Cup
Gold medal – first place	2019 Rockhampton
Silver medal – second place	2017 Sydney
Summer Youth Olympics
Bronze medal – third place	2010 Singapore	Team

Elizabeth Rose Keddell (born 31 January 1994) is a New Zealand field hockey player. She has competed for the New Zealand women's national field hockey team (the Black Sticks Women) since 2012, including at the 2014 Women's Hockey World Cup and the 2014 Commonwealth Games.

== Life ==
Keddell was born in Tauranga and attended Bethlehem College. She is a first cousin to Olympic sprinter Mark Keddell and Olympic gold medallist rower Mahé Drysdale.

She competed in the 2010 Summer Youth Olympics as part of the New Zealand girls' hockey team where she won a bronze medal. She was selected for the Black Sticks in November 2012 and played her first match against India in Napier on 8 December 2012. She participated at the 2020 Women's FIH Pro League.
