= Sophie Cocks =

New Zealand field hockey player

Personal information
- Born: 25 July 1994 (age 32) Christchurch, New Zealand
- Height: 1.72 m (5 ft 8 in)
- Weight: 62 kg (137 lb)

Sport
- Sport: Field hockey
- Position: Striker
Senior career
Years	Team	Caps	Goals
2012–	Canterbury Cats	-	-
National team
Years	Team	Caps	Goals
2013–	New Zealand	28	-
Medal record
Commonwealth Games
Bronze medal – third place	2014 Glasgow	Team

Sophie Cocks (born 25 July 1994) is a New Zealand field hockey player, and a member of the women's national team, the Black Sticks. She competed for New Zealand at the 2014 Women's Hockey World Cup and the women's hockey tournament at the 2014 Commonwealth Games, winning a bronze medal in the latter event.

Born in Christchurch, Cocks grew up in Lincoln, a satellite town southwest of the city. She attended St Margaret's College in Christchurch.

Cocks played her first senior international test on 30 October 2013 in Stratford, Taranaki, New Zealand against Australia as part of the 2013 Oceania Cup. She scored the winning goal in the 3–2 match, with a field goal in the 60th minute.
