= Elizabeth Thompson (field hockey) =

New Zealand field hockey player

Personal information
- Born: 8 December 1994 (age 31) Thames, New Zealand
- Height: 1.75 m (5 ft 9 in)
- Weight: 71 kg (157 lb)

Sport
- Sport: Field hockey
- Position: Defender
- Club: Auckland
Senior career
Years	Team	Caps	Goals
2024–	Surbiton	-	-
National team
Years	Team	Caps	Goals
2013–	New Zealand	166	-
Medal record
Representing New Zealand
Women's field hockey
Commonwealth Games
Gold medal – first place	2018 Gold Coast	Team
Bronze medal – third place	2014 Glasgow	Team
Oceania Cup
Silver medal – second place	2017 Sydney
Silver medal – second place	2023 Whangārei

Elizabeth Thompson (born 8 December 1994) is a New Zealand field hockey player who plays for the national team.

== Biography ==
Thompson competed in the women's hockey tournament at the 2014 Commonwealth Games where she won a bronze medal.

At the end of the 2024 season, she joined Surbiton Hockey Club in England. During the 2024–25 Women's England Hockey League season she was part of the Surbiton team that finished runner-up in the league behind Reading.
