= Papua New Guinea women's national field hockey team =

Papua New Guinea
- Association: OHF (Oceania)
- Confederation: Papua New Guinea Hockey Federation

FIH ranking
- Current: 47 (3 October 2026)

Oceania Cup
- Appearances: 3 (first in 2007)
- Best result: (bronze) 3rd (2017)
Medal record
Oceania Cup
Bronze medal – third place	2017 Sydney

The Papua New Guinea women's national field hockey team represents Papua New Guinea in international field hockey competitions and is controlled by the Papua New Guinea Hockey Federation.

== Results ==
=== Oceania Cup ===
- 2007 – 4th
- 2013 – 4th
- 2017 – (bronze)

=== Hockey World League ===
- 2012–13 – First round
- 2014–15 – First round
- 2016–17 – First round

=== Pacific Games ===
- 2003 – (silver)
- 2007 – (silver)
- 2015 – (silver)

== See also ==
- Fiji men's national field hockey team
