= Samoa women's national field hockey team =

National field hockey team

Samoa
- Association: OHF (Oceania)
- Confederation: Western Samoa Hockey Association

FIH ranking
- Current: 63 (3 October 2026)

Oceania Cup
- Appearances: 3 (first in 2009)
- Best result: (bronze) 3rd (2009, 2013, 2015)
Medal record
Oceania Cup
| Bronze medal – third place | 2009 Invercargill |
| Bronze medal – third place | 2013 Stratford |
| Bronze medal – third place | 2015 Stratford |

The Samoa women's national field hockey team represents Samoa in international field hockey competitions and is controlled by the Western Samoa Hockey Association.

== Results ==
=== Oceania Cup ===
- 2009 – (bronze)
- 2013 – (bronze)
- 2015 – (bronze)

=== Hockey World League ===
- 2012–13 – First round
- 2014–15 – First round

=== Pacific Games ===
- 2003 – (bronze)
- 2007 – (bronze)

== See also ==
- Fiji men's national field hockey team
