= New Zealand women's national field hockey team =

New Zealand
- Nickname(s): Vantage Black Sticks
- Association: New Zealand Hockey Federation
- Confederation: OHF (Oceania)
- Head Coach: Phil Burrows
- Assistant coach(es): Aaron Ford; Jude Menezes
- Manager: Denise Leggat
- Captain: Olivia Shannon
Home	Away

FIH ranking
- Current: 12 (3 October 2026)

Olympic Games
- Appearances: 8 (first in 1984)
- Best result: 4th (2012, 2016)

World Cup
- Appearances: 10 (first in 1983)
- Best result: 4th (1986)

Oceania Cup
- Appearances: 11 (first in 1999)
- Best result: (gold) 1st (2007, 2009, 2011, 2019)

The New Zealand women's national field hockey team is also known as the Black Sticks Women. The team's best performances include a gold medal at the 2018 Commonwealth Games, silver medal at the 2010 Commonwealth Games, a third placing at the 2011 Champions Trophy, and fourth placings at the 1986 World Cup, 2012 Summer Olympics and 2016 Summer Olympics. As of Jun 2024, the team ranks 11th on the International Hockey Federation (FIH) world rankings.

== Tournament records ==
World Cup
Year	Host city	Position
1983	Kuala Lumpur, Malaysia	7th
1986	Amsterdam, Netherlands	4th
1990	Sydney, Australia	7th
1998	Utrecht, Netherlands	6th
2002	Perth, Australia	11th
2010	Rosario, Argentina	7th
2014	The Hague, Netherlands	5th
2018	London, England	11th
2022	Terrassa, Spain; Amstelveen, Netherlands	5th
2026	Wavre, Belgium; Amstelveen, Netherlands	15th

Champions Trophy
Year	Host city	Position
1987	Amstelveen, Netherlands	6th
1999	Brisbane, Australia	5th
2000	Amstelveen, Netherlands	6th
2001	Amstelveen, Netherlands	5th
2002	Macau, China	5th
2004	Rosario, Argentina	6th
2006	Amstelveen, Netherlands	6th
2010	Nottingham, England	5th
2011	Amstelveen, Netherlands	3rd
2012	Rosario, Argentina	6th
2014	Mendoza, Argentina	4th
2016	London, United Kingdom	6th

World League
Year	Round	Host city	Position
2012–13	Semi-final	Rotterdam, Netherlands	4th
2012–13	Final	San Miguel de Tucumán, Argentina	5th
2014–15	Semi-final	Antwerp, Belgium	4th
2014–15	Final	Rosario, Argentina	2nd
2016–17	Semi-final	Brussels, Belgium	3rd
2016–17	Final	Auckland, New Zealand	2nd

FIH Pro League
Year	Season	Position
2019	Season One	6th
2020–21	Season Two	6th
2021–22	Season Three	Withdrew
2022–23	Season Four	8th
2023–24	Season Five	Withdrew
2024–25	Season Six	DNQ
2025–26	Season Seven	Withdrew

FIH Nations Cup
Year	Host city	Position
2023–24	Terrassa, Spain	4th
2024–25	Santiago, Chile	1st
2025–26	Auckland, New Zealand	2nd

Olympic Games
Year	Host city	Position
1980	Moscow, Soviet Union	N/A
1984	Los Angeles, United States	6th
1992	Barcelona, Spain	8th
2000	Sydney, Australia	6th
2004	Athens, Greece	6th
2008	Beijing, China	12th
2012	London, United Kingdom	4th
2016	Rio de Janeiro, Brazil	4th
2020	Tokyo, Japan	8th
2024	Paris, France	DNQ

Commonwealth Games
Year	Host city	Position
1998	Kuala Lumpur, Malaysia	3rd
2002	Manchester, England	4th
2006	Melbourne, Australia	3rd
2010	New Delhi, India	2nd
2014	Glasgow, Scotland	3rd
2018	Gold Coast, Australia	1st
2022	Birmingham, England	4th

Oceania Cup
Year	Host city	Position
1999	Sydney, Australia	2nd
2001	Auckland, New Zealand	2nd
2003	Melbourne, Australia; Auckland, New Zealand	2nd
2005	Sydney, Australia; Auckland, New Zealand	2nd
2007	Buderim, Australia	1st
2009	Invercargill, New Zealand	1st
2011	Hobart, Australia	1st
2013	Stratford, New Zealand	2nd
2015	Stratford, New Zealand	2nd
2017	Sydney, Australia	2nd
2019	Rockhampton, Australia	1st
2023	Whangārei, New Zealand	2nd
2025	Darwin, Australia	1st

Champions Challenge I
Year	Host city	Position
2003	Catania, Italy	4th
2005	Virginia Beach, United States	1st
2007	Baku, Azerbaijan	5th
2009	Cape Town, South Africa	1st

== Team ==
=== Current squad ===
Roster for the 2026 Women's FIH Hockey World Cup.

Head coach: Phillip Burrows

2. Olivia Shannon (C)
3. Ella Hyatt-Brown
8. Hannah Cotter
9. Emelia Surridge
11. Casey Crowley
12. Tessa Reid
13. Josephine Murray
15. Grace O'Hanlon (GK)
16. Elizabeth Thompson
18. Anna Crowley
22. Katie Doar
24. Paige Blake
25. Ruby Baker
26. Kaitlin Cotter
27. Holly Pearson
31. Riana Pho
34. Julia Gluyas (GK)
37. Emma Findlay
38. Brittany Wang
40. Rebecca Baker

=== Records ===
Highest Capped Players
Rank	Player	Games
1	Stacey Michelsen	296
2	Olivia Merry	284
3	Samantha Child	277
4	Emily Gaddum	274
5	Anita McLaren	271
6	Kayla Whitelock	256
7	Gemma McCaw	250
8	Suzie Muirhead	238
9	Elizabeth Thompson	225
10	Charlotte Harrison	222

Highest Goal Scorers
Rank	Player	Goals
1	Olivia Merry	128
2	Anita McLaren	105
3	Krystal Forgesson	77
3	Katie Glynn	77
5	Gemma McCaw	72
6	Charlotte Harrison	65
7	Kayla Whitelock	63
8	Niniwa Roberts	47
9	Samantha Harrison	42
10	Suzie Muirhead	41

=== Notable players ===
- Christine Arthur
- Tina Bell-Kake
- Samantha Child
- Helen Clarke
- Mary Clinton
- Krystal Forgesson
- Emily Gaddum
- Katie Glynn
- Charlotte Harrison
- Samantha Harrison
- Anna Lawrence
- Gemma McCaw
- Anita McLaren
- Olivia Merry
- Stacey Michelsen
- Suzie Muirhead
- Niniwa Roberts
- Amanda Smith
- Kayla Whitelock

== Results ==
=== Past results ===
- New Zealand women's national field hockey team results (2011–15)
- New Zealand women's national field hockey team results (2016–20)

=== Fixtures and Results ===
==== Oceania Cup ====
4 September 2025 Match 1	Australia	0–1	New Zealand	Darwin, Australia
TBD				Stadium: Marrara Hockey Centre

6 September 2025 Match 2	Australia	1–0	New Zealand	Darwin, Australia
TBD				Stadium: Marrara Hockey Centre

7 September 2025 Match 3	Australia	1–1 (3–5 p)	New Zealand	Darwin, Australia
TBD				Stadium: Marrara Hockey Centre

==== Summer of Hockey Series ====
21 January 2026 Match 1	New Zealand	1–2	United States	Dunedin, New Zealand
18:30	H. Cotter 23'	Report	Ramsey 37'; Tamer 57'	Stadium: Alexander McMillan Hockey Centre

22 January 2026 Match 2	New Zealand	4–1	New Zealand A	Dunedin, New Zealand
18:30	H. Cotter 33'; Shannon 42'; Surridge 52'; Pho 58'	Report	Willocks 6'	Stadium: Alexander McMillan Hockey Centre

24 January 2026 Match 3	New Zealand	1–0	Japan	Dunedin, New Zealand
16:00	Gravenall 53'	Report		Stadium: Alexander McMillan Hockey Centre

25 January 2026 Final	United States	2–1	New Zealand	Dunedin, New Zealand
16:00	Tamer 29'; Gladieux 43'	Report	H. Cotter 32'	Stadium: Alexander McMillan Hockey Centre

==== West Taihu Lake Cup 2026 ====
27 April 2026 Test Match	Argentina	3–2	New Zealand	Changzhou, China
	Alastra; Bruggesser; Díaz		no data	Stadium: Wujin Hockey Stadium

1 May 2026 Test Match	Argentina	3–2	New Zealand	Changzhou, China
	Ambrosini; Díaz; Pisthón		Cotter; Findlay	Stadium: Wujin Hockey Stadium

3 May 2026 Test Match	Argentina	7–0	New Zealand	Changzhou, China
	Granatto M. x2 Pisthón; Raposo; Trinchinetti; Miranda; Bruggesser			Stadium: Wujin Hockey Stadium

==== 2026 FIH Nations Cup ====
15 June 2026 Pool B	New Zealand	3–1	South Korea	Auckland, New Zealand
18:00	K. Cotter 10'; Gravenall 40'; H. Cotter 41'	Report	Choi 31'	Stadium: National Hockey Centre

16 June 2026 Pool B	Chile	2–3	New Zealand	Auckland, New Zealand
18:00	Maldonado 4'; Avelli 20'	Report	Shannon 32'; Pearson 37'; Murray 56'	Stadium: National Hockey Centre

18 June 2026 Pool B	New Zealand	2–1	France	Auckland, New Zealand
18:00	K. Cotter 26'; Blake 57'	Report	Garot 33'	Stadium: National Hockey Centre

20 June 2026 Semi finals	New Zealand	1–1 (4–1 p)	United States	Auckland, New Zealand
18:30	Cotter 35'	Report	Hoffman 31'	Stadium: National Hockey Centre
	Penalties
	Shannon (penalty shoot-out scored); Cotter (penalty shoot-out scored); Pho (penalty shoot-out scored); Murray (penalty shoot-out scored)		(penalty shoot-out missed) Adams; (penalty shoot-out missed) Heck; (penalty shoot-out scored) Sessa

21 June 2026 Final	India	2–0	New Zealand	Auckland, New Zealand
18:30	Navneet 4'; Sunelita 15'	Report		Stadium: National Hockey Centre

==== 2026 Women's FIH Hockey World Cup ====
16 August 2026 Pool B	Belgium	5–2	New Zealand	Wavre, Belgium
17:30	Vanden Borre 9'; Puvrez 12'; Englebert 22'; Rasir 41', 47'	Report	Doar 4'; Cotter 33'	Stadium: Belfius Hockey Arena

18 August 2026 Pool B	New Zealand	2–3	Ireland	Wavre, Belgium
11:00	Surridge 35'; Doar 60'	Report	Hawkshaw 24'; Upton 49'; Mullan 57'	Stadium: Belfius Hockey Arena

20 August 2026 Pool B	New Zealand	0–3	Spain	Wavre, Belgium
14:00		Report	Álvarez 40', 55', 60'	Stadium: Belfius Hockey Arena

22 August 2026 Pool H	United States	1–1	New Zealand	Wavre, Belgium
14:30	Danahy 39'	Report	Surridge 8'	Stadium: Belfius Hockey Arena

24 August 2026 Pool H	New Zealand	1–2	Scotland	Wavre, Belgium
11:00	Wang 23'	Report	Burnet 26'; McEwan 45'	Stadium: Belfius Hockey Arena

27 August 2026 15th place match	Chile	2–3	New Zealand	Wavre, Belgium
11:00	Urroz 37', 45'	Report	Cotter 10'; Pho 50'; Doar 57'	Stadium: Belfius Hockey Arena

== See also ==
- New Zealand men's national field hockey team
- New Zealand women's national under-21 field hockey team
