= Australia women's national field hockey team results (2011–2015) =

The following article comprises the results of the Hockeyroos, the women's national field hockey team from Australia, from 2011 until 2015. New fixtures can be found on the International Hockey Federation's results portal.

== Match results ==
=== 2011 Results ===
==== Four Nations Tournament (Mendoza) ====
9 February 2011 Group Stage	Australia	1–1	Germany	Mendoza, Argentina
	Close 28'	Report	Hoffmann 11'

10 February 2011 Group Stage	United States	0–1	Australia	Mendoza, Argentina
		Report	Olivieri 47'

12 February 2011 Group Stage	Argentina	1–1	Australia	Mendoza, Argentina
	Barrionuevo 54'	Report	Eastham 53'

13 February 2011 Final	Argentina	2–3 (a.e.t.)	Australia	Mendoza, Argentina
	Merino 46'; Rebecchi 58'	Report	Nelson 8'; Schulz 70', 71'

==== Four Nations Tournament (Rosario) ====
16 February 2011 Group Stage	Argentina	1–1	Australia	Rosario, Argentina
	Sruoga 51'	Report	Olivieri 55'

17 February 2011 Group Stage	Germany	2–1	Australia	Rosario, Argentina
	Hoffmann 23', 64'	Report	Nelson 35'

19 February 2011 Group Stage	Australia	1–3	United States	Rosario, Argentina
	Nelson 57'	Report	13', 45', 67'

19 February 2011 3rd Place Match	Germany	1–2	Australia	Rosario, Argentina
	Puetz 22'	Report	Schulz 52'; Nelson 62'

==== Argentina Test Series ====
2 April 2011 Test Match	Australia	2–3	Argentina	Canberra, Australia
	Schulz 32'; Close 61'	Report	Sruoga 7'; Merino 13'; D'Elia 23'	Stadium: National Hockey Centre

5 April 2011 Test Match	Australia	2–3	Argentina	Canberra, Australia
	White 35'; Boyce 49'	Report	Sruoga 26'; Barrionuevo 61'; Sánchez Moccia 64'	Stadium: National Hockey Centre

8 April 2011 Test Match	Australia	1–0	Argentina	Sydney, Australia
	Nelson 52'	Report		Stadium: Sydney Olympic Park

9 April 2011 Test Match	Australia	0–0	Argentina	Sydney, Australia
		Report		Stadium: Sydney Olympic Park

==== Four Nations Tournament (Bremen) ====
16 June 2011 Test Match	Australia	3–3	Argentina	Bremen, Germany
	Trost 22'; Parker 32'; Nelson 62'	Report	García 50'; Sánchez Moccia 63'; Barrionuevo 67'

18 June 2011 Test Match	Germany	3–0	Australia	Bremen, Germany
	Keller 38', 62'; Rinne 62'	Report

19 June 2011 Test Match	Australia	2–1	South Korea	Bremen, Germany
	Hurtz 5'; Rivers 57'	Report	Kim Jong-eun 41'

==== Champions Trophy ====
25 June 2011 Group Stage	Netherlands	3–0	Australia	Amstelveen, Netherlands
16:30	Paumen 7'; Welten 19'; Dijkstra 57'	Report		Stadium: Wagener Stadium

26 June 2011 Group Stage	Australia	2–3	New Zealand	Amstelveen, Netherlands
14:00	Close 52'; Eastham 64'	Report	Glynn 10'; Forgesson 11'; Finlayson 44'	Stadium: Wagener Stadium

28 June 2011 Group Stage	Australia	1–0	Germany	Amstelveen, Netherlands
13:00	Schulz 65'	Report		Stadium: Wagener Stadium

30 June 2011 Classification Round	China	2–2	Australia	Amstelveen, Netherlands
11:30	Li Hongxia 30'; Gao Lihua 54'	Report	Eastham 16'; Schulz 23'	Stadium: Wagener Stadium

1 July 2011 Classification Round	England	3–2	Australia	Amstelveen, Netherlands
14:30	Walsh 34'; Panter 43'; White 60'	Report	Hudson 41', 67'	Stadium: Wagener Stadium

3 July 2011 5th Place Match	England	2–0	Australia	Amstelveen, Netherlands
11:30	Herbert 8'; Rogers 52'	Report		Stadium: Wagener Stadium

==== Oceania Cup ====
6 October 2011 Group Stage	Australia	2–1	New Zealand	Hobart, Australia
19:30	Flanagan 25', 32'	Report	Glynn 4'	Stadium: Tasmanian Hockey Centre

8 October 2011 Group Stage	New Zealand	3–3	Australia	Hobart, Australia
13:00	Naylor 7'; S. Harrison 8'; Punt 35'	Report	Flanagan 21'; Eastham 56'; Smith 62'	Stadium: Tasmanian Hockey Centre

9 October 2011 Group Stage	New Zealand	4–2	Australia	Hobart, Australia
13:00	C. Harrison 7'; Sharland 20'; Eshuis 58'; Michelsen 65'	Report	Schulz 14'; Messent 35'	Stadium: Tasmanian Hockey Centre

==== India Test Series ====
14 October 2011 Test Match	Australia	3–2	India	Perth, Australia
	Jenner 7'; Korner 15'; Hurtz 59'	Report	Yendala 48'; Anjum 69'	Stadium: Perth Hockey Stadium

15 October 2011 Test Match	Australia	1–2	India	Perth, Australia
	Korner 4'	Report	Yendala 41'; Katariya 64'	Stadium: Perth Hockey Stadium

17 October 2011 Test Match	Australia	1–1	India	Perth, Australia
	Hurtz 3'	Report	Katariya 17'	Stadium: Perth Hockey Stadium

18 October 2011 Test Match	Australia	6–0	India	Perth, Australia
	Stacy 4'; Hurtz 16', 55'; Dwyer 63'; Attard 65'; Greenshields 69'	Report		Stadium: Perth Hockey Stadium

==== China Test Series ====
26 October 2011 Test Match	Australia	3–1	China	Busselton, Australia
	Schulz 17', 21'; Boyce 54'	Report	Zhao 19'

27 October 2011 Test Match	Australia	1–0	China	Busselton, Australia
	Schulz 39'	Report

30 October 2011 Test Match	Australia	3–0	China	Bunbury, Australia
	Nanscawen 5'; Flanagan 8'; Hollywood 13'	Report

31 October 2011 Test Match	Australia	1–1	China	Bunbury, Australia
	Messent 51'	Report	Ma 26'

2 November 2011 Test Match	Australia	8–1	China	Perth, Australia
	Schulz 5', 38', 44', 59'; Blyth 9'; Flanagan 35'; White 41'; Nanscawen 57'	Report	Song 67'	Stadium: Perth Hockey Stadium

3 November 2011 Test Match	Australia	6–4	China	Perth, Australia
	Blyth 4'; Eastham 13'; Nanscawen 20'; Eglington 36'; Nelson 42', 63'	Report	Gao 2', 10'; Peng 53'; Mao 58'	Stadium: Perth Hockey Stadium

=== 2012 Results ===
==== United States Test Series ====
14 January 2012 Test Match	United States	2–2	Australia	San Diego, United States
13:00	Smith 29', 60'	Report	Smith 14'; Messent 30'

15 January 2012 Test Match	United States	0–1	Australia	San Diego, United States
13:00		Report	Nanscawen 40'

17 January 2012 Test Match	United States	1–1	Australia	San Diego, United States
13:00	6'	Report	White 62'

18 January 2012 Test Match	United States	0–1	Australia	San Diego, United States
13:00		Report	Rivers 35'

==== Netherlands Test Series ====
22 January 2012 Test Match	Netherlands	1–4	Australia	Buenos Aires, Argentina
	8'	Report	Rivers 4'; Messent 13'; Schulz 19'; Close 53'

22 January 2012 Test Match	Netherlands	1–0	Australia	Buenos Aires, Argentina
	Agliotti 6'	Report

==== Germany Test Match ====
25 January 2012 Test Match	Germany	1–3	Australia	Rosario, Argentina
	23'	Report	Hurtz 1'; Eastham 58'; White 60'

==== Japan Test Match ====
26 January 2012 Test Match	Japan	1–2	Australia	Rosario, Argentina
	30'	Report	Smith 12', 33'

==== Korea Test Series ====
6 March 2012 Test Match	Australia	2–4	South Korea	Perth, Australia
	Smith 12'; Eastham 46'	Report	Kim Jong-eun 6', 55'; Kim Jong-hee 40'; Cheon Eun-bi 52'	Stadium: Perth Hockey Stadium

7 March 2012 Test Match	Australia	5–0	South Korea	Perth, Australia
	Eastham 5', 48'; Parker 33'; Smith 51'; Boyce 56'	Report		Stadium: Perth Hockey Stadium

9 March 2012 Test Match	Australia	5–0	South Korea	Perth, Australia
	Blyth 23'; Schulz 32', 54'; Close 42', 46'	Report		Stadium: Perth Hockey Stadium

10 March 2012 Test Match	Australia	3–1	South Korea	Perth, Australia
	Eastham 33'; Smith 42'; Schulz 56'	Report	Kim Da-rae 54'	Stadium: Perth Hockey Stadium

==== United States Test Series ====
5 April 2012 Test Match	Australia	0–1	United States	Sunshine Coast, Australia
18:00		Report	Taylor 8'

7 April 2012 Test Match	Australia	1–2	United States	Sunshine Coast, Australia
18:00	Nelson 29'	Report	Vittese 14'; Taylor 31'

8 April 2012 Test Match	Australia	3–0	United States	Sunshine Coast, Australia
20:00	Hurtz 12'; Messent 15'; Close 38'	Report

==== Four Nations Tournament (North Harbour) ====
12 April 2012 Group Stage	Australia	4–0	United States	North Shore, New Zealand
16:30	Schulz 19'; Rivers 22'; Nanscawen 43'; Eastham 64'	Report

13 April 2012 Group Stage	New Zealand	1–3	Australia	North Shore, New Zealand
16:30	Glynn 34'	Report	Boyce 33'; Schulz 57'; Nelson 62'

15 April 2012 Group Stage	Australia	1–0	India	North Shore, New Zealand
16:30	Nanscawen 6'	Report

16 April 2012 Final	Australia	2–3	New Zealand	North Shore, New Zealand
18:30	Flanagan 51'; Schulz 64'	Report	Sharland 12'; Glynn 43'; Harrison 64'

==== Four Nations Tournament (Auckland) ====
18 April 2012 Group Stage	New Zealand	3–3	Australia	Auckland, New Zealand
15:00	Punt 8', 69'; Sharland 56'	Report	Smith 15'; Schulz 44'; Nanscawen 48'

19 April 2012 Group Stage	Australia	5–2	India	Auckland, New Zealand
13:00	Schulz 2', 28'; Boyce 12'; Nanscawen 60'	Report	Poonam 13', 63'

21 April 2012 Group Stage	Australia	5–1	United States	Auckland, New Zealand
17:30	Schulz 2'; Nanscawen 12'; Close 43', 46'; Attard 46'	Report	Laubach 16'

22 April 2012 Final	Australia	3–1	New Zealand	Auckland, New Zealand
19:30	Nelson 7'; Close 8'; Nanscawen 15'	Report	Glynn 49'

==== Great Britain Test Series ====
1 June 2012 Test Match	Great Britain	0–0	Australia	London, United Kingdom
		Report		Stadium: Lee Valley Hockey and Tennis Centre

2 June 2012 Test Match	Great Britain	1–3	Australia	London, United Kingdom
	Bartlett 48'	Report	Schulz 3'; Boyce 45'; Munro 58'	Stadium: Lee Valley Hockey and Tennis Centre

==== Investec Cup ====
5 June 2012 Group Stage	Netherlands	2–1	Australia	Chiswick, United Kingdom
14:00	Paumen 49', 52'	Report	Smith 46'	Stadium: Quintin Hogg Memorial Sports Ground

6 June 2012 Group Stage	Australia	4–1	Ireland	Chiswick, United Kingdom
17:30	Boyce 3'; Smith 10'; Schulz 19'; Eastham 48'	Report	Daly 55'	Stadium: Quintin Hogg Memorial Sports Ground

9 June 2012 Semi-final	Germany	2–3	Australia	Chiswick, United Kingdom
17:00	Stöckel 5'; Hoffmann 49'	Report	Smith 54'; McGurk 65'; Flanagan 70'	Stadium: Quintin Hogg Memorial Sports Ground

10 June 2012 Final	Netherlands	4–1	Australia	Chiswick, United Kingdom
16:00	Dirkse van den Heuvel 28'; Paumen 44', 56'; Jonker 46'	Report	Nanscawen 47'	Stadium: Quintin Hogg Memorial Sports Ground

==== Olympic Games ====
29 July 2012 Group Stage	New Zealand	1–0	Australia	London, United Kingdom
08:30	Finlayson 3'	Report		Stadium: Riverbank Arena

31 July 2012 Group Stage	Germany	1–3	Australia	London, United Kingdom
21:15	Otte 9'	Report	Munro 20'; Flanagan 46'; Boyce 53'	Stadium: Riverbank Arena

2 August 2012 Group Stage	Australia	1–0	United States	London, United Kingdom
10:45	Flanagan 33'	Report		Stadium: Riverbank Arena

4 August 2012 Group Stage	Australia	1–0	South Africa	London, United Kingdom
08:30	Close 8'	Report		Stadium: Riverbank Arena

6 August 2012 Group Stage	Argentina	0–0	Australia	London, United Kingdom
21:15		Report		Stadium: Riverbank Arena

10 August 2012 5th Place Match	China	0–2	Australia	London, United Kingdom
11:30		Report	Schulz 41'; Close 60'	Stadium: Riverbank Arena

==== Champions Challenge I ====
29 September 2012 Group Stage	Australia	4–1	Belgium	Dublin, Ireland
12:30	Schulz 20'; Eastham 26'; Flanagan 47'; Blyth 67'	Report	Sinia 54'	Stadium: University College Dublin

30 September 2012 Group Stage	India	1–8	Australia	Dublin, Ireland
13:00	Rani 18'	Report	Blyth 3', 57'; Eastham 21'; Schulz 24', 70'; Messent 50'; Nanscawen 64'; Hurtz 68'	Stadium: University College Dublin

2 October 2012 Group Stage	Australia	4–0	Wales	Dublin, Ireland
13:30	Hurtz 1', 68', 70'; Smith 38'	Report		Stadium: University College Dublin

4 October 2012 Quarterfinals	Australia	2–1	South Africa	Dublin, Ireland
15:30	Flanagan 11'; Smith 66'	Report	Damons 18'	Stadium: University College Dublin

6 October 2012 Semi-final	Australia	2–0	Scotland	Dublin, Ireland
15:00	Schulz 52'; Flanagan 56'	Report		Stadium: University College Dublin

7 October 2012 Final	Australia	6–1	United States	Dublin, Ireland
16:30	Close 17', 32'; Nanscawen 24'; Smith 39'; Schulz 59', 68'	Report	Dawson 4'	Stadium: University College Dublin

=== 2013 Results ===
2015 Statistics
Pld	W	D	L	GF	GA	GD	Pts
32	16	8	8	119	43	+76	56

==== South Africa Test Match ====
29 January 2013 Test Match	South Africa	4–0	Australia	Cape Town, South Africa
18:00	Lategan 8'; Coetzee 23'; Mayne 61'; Chamberlain 64'	Report		Stadium: Hartleyvale Stadium

==== Investec Cup ====
4 February 2013 Group Stage	Netherlands	2–2	Australia	Cape Town, South Africa
18:00	Paumen 41'; Jonker 65'	Report	Eastham 9'; Nanscawen 56'	Stadium: Hartleyvale Stadium

5 February 2013 Group Stage	South Africa	1–1	Australia	Cape Town, South Africa
20:00	Mayne 59'	Report	Flanagan 51'	Stadium: Hartleyvale Stadium

7 February 2013 Group Stage	England	1–3	Australia	Cape Town, South Africa
18:00	White 68'	Report	Flanagan 15'; Schulz 41'; Nanscawen 58'	Stadium: Hartleyvale Stadium

9 February 2013 Semi-final	Australia	1–2	South Africa	Cape Town, South Africa
17:00	Eastham 70'	Report	Coetzee 12', 35'	Stadium: Hartleyvale Stadium

10 February 2013 3rd Place Match	England	2–2 (3–2 p)	Australia	Cape Town, South Africa
11:30	Bray 44'; Gilbert 68'	Report	Boyce 24'; Johnson 52'	Stadium: Hartleyvale Stadium

==== Korea Test Series ====
24 April 2013 Test Match	Australia	4–2	South Korea	Perth, Australia
17:30	Nelson 41', 47'; Blyth 54'; Messent 63'	Report	Park Mi-hyun 25'; Kim Young-ran 59'	Stadium: Perth Hockey Stadium

25 April 2013 Test Match	Australia	1–2	South Korea	Perth, Australia
17:30	Blyth 2'	Report	Park Mi-hyun 19'; Kim Young-ran 66'	Stadium: Perth Hockey Stadium

27 April 2013 Test Match	Australia	6–0	South Korea	Perth, Australia
14:00	Smith 35', 58'; Nelson 40'; Blyth 60', 67'; Messent 62'	Report		Stadium: Perth Hockey Stadium

28 April 2013 Test Match	Australia	1–3	South Korea	Perth, Australia
14:00	McMahon 23'	Report	Cheon Seul-ki 15', 40'; Park Mi-hyun 20'	Stadium: Perth Hockey Stadium

==== Belgium Test Match ====
8 June 2013 Test Match	Belgium	1–1	Australia	Belgium
14:00	Sinia 57'	Report	Flanagan 59'

==== Hockey World League Semifinals ====
22 June 2013 Group Stage	Australia	5–0	Spain	London, United Kingdom
16:30	Nanscawen 33'; Messent 41'; White 45'; 51'; Hurtz 70'	Report		Stadium: Quintin Hogg Memorial Sports Ground

23 June 2013 Group Stage	Australia	1–1	England	London, United Kingdom
17:00	Schulz 60'	Report	Webb 25'	Stadium: Quintin Hogg Memorial Sports Ground

25 June 2013 Group Stage	South Africa	0–1	Australia	London, United Kingdom
17:30		Report	Flanagan 43'	Stadium: Quintin Hogg Memorial Sports Ground

27 June 2013 Quarterfinals	Australia	4–1	United States	London, United Kingdom
15:00	Smith 7'; White 12'; McMahon 22'; Schulz 25'	Report	Dawson 10'	Stadium: Quintin Hogg Memorial Sports Ground

29 June 2013 Semi-final	China	1–4	Australia	London, United Kingdom
15:00	Li Hongxia 28'	Report	Nelson 29'; Messent 51'; Parker 58'; Hurtz 63'	Stadium: Quintin Hogg Memorial Sports Ground

30 June 2013 Final	England	0–3	Australia	London, United Kingdom
18:00		Report	Nelson 12'; White 23'; Smith 60'	Stadium: Quintin Hogg Memorial Sports Ground

==== Argentina Test Series ====
12 October 2013 Test Match	Australia	0–1	Argentina	Perth, Australia
		Report	Barrionuevo 43'	Stadium: Perth Hockey Stadium

15 October 2013 Test Match	Australia	3–2	Argentina	Perth, Australia
	Johnson 2'; Messent 12'; Nelson 17'	Report	Rebecchi 13', 68'	Stadium: Perth Hockey Stadium

16 October 2013 Test Match	Australia	1–3	Argentina	Perth, Australia
	Nelson 56'	Report	Albertario 27', 66'; Rodríguez 34'	Stadium: Perth Hockey Stadium

==== International Super Series Hockey 9's ====
17 October 2013 Group Stage	Australia	8–0	Malaysia	Perth, Australia
18:25	Nelson 19', 28', 35'; Taylor 26'; Blyth 30'; Peris 31'; Eastham 33'; Messent 36'	Report		Stadium: Perth Hockey Stadium

18 October 2013 Group Stage	Australia	7–0	Canada	Perth, Australia
19:20	Parker 8', 34'; Blyth 13', 37', 40'; Close 23'; Peris 26'	Report		Stadium: Perth Hockey Stadium

19 October 2013 Group Stage	Australia	3–3	Argentina	Perth, Australia
13:10	Parker 13'; Nelson 30'; Eastham 34'	Report	Aymar 7'; Cavallero 26'; Rebecchi 27'	Stadium: Perth Hockey Stadium

20 October 2013 Final	Australia	3–0	Argentina	Perth, Australia
12:50	Blyth 2'; Parker 9'; Eastham 39'	Report		Stadium: Perth Hockey Stadium

==== Canada Test Series ====
22 October 2013 Test Match	Australia	3–0	Canada	Perth, Australia
	Nelson 14', 48'; Peris 66'	Report		Stadium: Perth Hockey Stadium

24 October 2013 Test Match	Australia	3–0	Canada	Perth, Australia
	Eastham 6'; Nelson 20'; Schulz 29'	Report		Stadium: Perth Hockey Stadium

==== Oceania Cup ====
30 October 2013 Group Stage	New Zealand	3–2	Australia	Stratford, New Zealand
17:30	Flynn 7'; Webster 34'; Cocks 60'	Report	White 25'; Peris 31'

31 October 2013 Group Stage	Australia	23–0	Samoa	Stratford, New Zealand
13:30	Bone 3'; Nelson 6', 62'; Claxton 7'; White 13', 21', 37', 48', 50'; Flanagan 17', 26', 46'; Blyth 19', 30'; Schulz 23'; Eastham 30'; Smith 34', 60', 66', 68'; Holzberger 52'; Parker 54'; Messent 60'	Report

2 November 2013 Group Stage	Australia	26–0	Papua New Guinea	Stratford, New Zealand
08:00	Holzberger 4'; Messent 8', 35'; Nelson 10', 11', 19', 21', 34', 43'; White 13', 16', 24', 32', 43'; Parker 15', 31', 40', 49'; 26', 33'; Eastham 38'; Schulz 45', 62'; Peris 56', 58'; Claxton 70'	Report

3 November 2013 Final	New Zealand	2–2 (4–5 p)	Australia	Stratford, New Zealand
14:00	Forgesson 17'; Webster 55'	Report	Holzberger 5'; Blyth 62'
	Penalties
	Sharland (penalty shoot-out scored); Charlton (penalty shoot-out missed); Dennison (penalty shoot-out scored); Flynn (penalty shoot-out scored); Punt (penalty shoot-out missed) —— Sharland (penalty shoot-out scored); Charlton (penalty shoot-out missed)		(penalty shoot-out scored) Blyth; (penalty shoot-out scored) White; (penalty shoot-out missed) Flanagan; (penalty shoot-out missed) Parker; (penalty shoot-out scored) Messent —— (penalty shoot-out scored) Blyth; (penalty shoot-out scored) White

==== Hockey World League Final ====
30 November 2013 Group Stage	Argentina	1–1	Australia	Tucumán, Argentina
21:00	Merino 14'	Report	31'	Stadium: Club Natación y Gimnasia

1 December 2013 Group Stage	Australia	5–1	China	Tucumán, Argentina
18:30	Messent 15'; White 18'; Smith 36', 50'; Schulz 70'	Report	Wang Mengyu 31'	Stadium: Club Natación y Gimnasia

3 December 2013 Group Stage	Australia	5–1	New Zealand	Tucumán, Argentina
18:30	Parker 11'; Nelson 22'; White 42', 66'; Schulz 54'	Report	Webster 13'	Stadium: Club Natación y Gimnasia

5 December 2013 Quarterfinals	Australia	1–1 (4–2 p)	Germany	Tucumán, Argentina
11:30	Nelson 48'	Report	Hoffmann 11'	Stadium: Club Natación y Gimnasia
	Penalties
	Blyth (penalty shoot-out scored); White (penalty shoot-out scored); Parker (penalty shoot-out scored); Messent (penalty shoot-out scored)		(penalty shoot-out missed) Müller; (penalty shoot-out scored) Mävers; (penalty shoot-out scored) Teschke; (penalty shoot-out missed) Stöckel

7 December 2013 Semi-final	England	0–3	Australia	Tucumán, Argentina
18:30		Report	Schulz 32'; Parker 37'; McMahon 41'	Stadium: Club Natación y Gimnasia

8 December 2013 Gold Medal Match	Netherlands	5–1	Australia	Tucumán, Argentina
21:30	Paumen 43', 64'; Drost 43' van Male 52'; Welten 67'	Report	Flanagan 6'	Stadium: Club Natación y Gimnasia

=== 2014 Results ===
2015 Statistics
Pld	W	D	L	GF	GA	GD	Pts
40	25	10	5	122	57	+65	85

==== South Africa Test Series ====
22 January 2014 Test Match	South Africa	3–3	Australia	Stellenbosch, South Africa
19:00	Chamberlain 14', 58'; Coetzee 50'	Report	Smith 31'; Schulz 45'; Peris 65'

24 January 2014 Test Match	South Africa	1–0	Australia	Stellenbosch, South Africa
19:00	Coetzee 59'	Report

25 January 2014 Test Match	South Africa	1–4	Australia	Stellenbosch, South Africa
16:00	Russell 54'	Report	Schulz 26'; Williams 32'; White 44'; Nanscawen 68'

==== Japan Test Series ====
21 March 2014 Test Match	Australia	6–1	Japan	Kalgoorlie, Australia
18:30	Parker 20', 58'; Smith 20', 35+'; Nanscawen 47'; Claxton 55'	Report	Mano 12'

22 March 2014 Test Match	Australia	3–1	Japan	Kalgoorlie, Australia
18:30	Smith 15'; Kenny 17', 29'	Report	Shibata 70+'

25 March 2014 Test Match	Australia	5–2	Japan	Perth, Australia
19:30	Kenny 19'; McMahon 38'; White 42'; Parker 43'; Smith 56'	Report	Ono 22'; Sakai 70+'	Stadium: Perth Hockey Stadium

27 March 2014 Test Match	Australia	3–1	Japan	Perth, Australia
17:30	Flanagan 45', 70+'; Smith 47'	Report	Shibata 50'	Stadium: Perth Hockey Stadium

28 March 2014 Test Match	Australia	5–2	Japan	Perth, Australia
19:30	Nanscawen 3'; Kenny 14'; Blyth 18'; Peris 29'; Nelson 51'	Report	Otsuka 32'; Ota 46'	Stadium: Perth Hockey Stadium

==== Hawke's Bay Cup ====
5 April 2014 Group Stage	Australia	0–3	Argentina	Hastings, New Zealand
14:00		Report	Aymar 17'; Juárez 30'; Rebecchi 40'	Stadium: Hawke's Bay Sports Park

6 April 2014 Group Stage	Australia	1–0	Japan	Hastings, New Zealand
12:00	Smith 19'	Report		Stadium: Hawke's Bay Sports Park

8 April 2014 Group Stage	Australia	4–0	China	Hastings, New Zealand
17:00	Nanscawen 15'; Carmichael 23'; White 59', 65'	Report		Stadium: Hawke's Bay Sports Park

10 April 2014 Group Stage	Australia	5–3	South Korea	Hastings, New Zealand
17:00	Smith 1'; Schulz 11'; Flanagan 43'; White 44'; Taylor 64'	Report	Park Ki-ju 10'; Park Mi-hyun 67'; Han Hye-lyoung 70'	Stadium: Hawke's Bay Sports Park

12 April 2014 Group Stage	New Zealand	2–4	Australia	Hastings, New Zealand
15:30	Fremaux 3'; Punt 33'	Report	Nanscawen 11'; Peris 23'; Claxton 28'; Schulz 62'	Stadium: Hawke's Bay Sports Park

14 April 2014 Final	Argentina	3–0	Australia	Hastings, New Zealand
16:00	Sanchez Moccia 28'; Merino 41'; Rebecchi 51'	Report		Stadium: Hawke's Bay Sports Park

==== Four Nations Invitational Tournament ====
15 May 2014 Match 1	Australia	4–2	England	Bremen, Germany
15:00	Flanagan 40', 63'; Parker 55'; Kenny 70+'	Report	Owsley 4'; Danson 66'

17 May 2014 Match 2	Australia	6–1	Japan	Bremen, Germany
14:00	Parker 3'; Kenny 5', 59'; Smith 13'; Flanagan 17'; Bone 54'	Report	Nishimura 35+'

18 May 2014 Match 3	Germany	3–3	Australia	Bremen, Germany
14:30	Bachmann 5'; Haase 25'; Hillmann 46'	Report	Smith 14'; Nanscawen 33'; Parker 70+'

==== Belgium Test Match ====
21 May 2014 Test Match	Belgium	1–3	Australia	Antwerp, Belgium
	Fobe 69'	Report	Claxton 2'; Hurtz 62'; Smith 66'	Stadium: KHC Dragons

==== Hockey World Cup ====
31 May 2014 Group Stage	Australia	3–2	South Korea	The Hague, Netherlands
14:30	Hurtz 12'; Flanagan 49', 57'	Report	Cheon Eun-bi 7'; Cheon Seul-ki 63'	Stadium: Greenfields Stadium

2 June 2014 Group Stage	Australia	3–2	Japan	The Hague, Netherlands
10:30	Flanagan 36', 44'; Smith 41'	Report	H. Nagai 20'; Sakai 57'	Stadium: Kyocera Stadium

5 June 2014 Group Stage	Belgium	2–3	Australia	The Hague, Netherlands
10:30	De Groof 35'; Boon 42'	Report	Flanagan 16'; Kenny 38', 54'	Stadium: Kyocera Stadium

7 June 2014 Group Stage	Australia	0–2	Netherlands	The Hague, Netherlands
19:45		Report	Lammers 57' van As 65'	Stadium: Kyocera Stadium

9 June 2014 Group Stage	New Zealand	0–0	Australia	The Hague, Netherlands
10:30		Report		Stadium: Kyocera Stadium

12 June 2014 Semi-final	United States	2–2 (1–3 p)	Australia	The Hague, Netherlands
16:00	Kolojejchick 48', 68'	Report	White 33'; Flanagan 52'	Stadium: Kyocera Stadium
	Penalties
	O'Donnell (penalty shoot-out missed); Selenski (penalty shoot-out missed); Kolojejchick (penalty shoot-out scored); Kasold (penalty shoot-out missed)		(penalty shoot-out missed) Blyth; (penalty shoot-out scored) White; (penalty shoot-out scored) Parker; (penalty shoot-out scored) Kenny

14 June 2014 Gold Medal Match	Netherlands	2–0	Australia	The Hague, Netherlands
15:15	Paumen 12'; Lammers 29'	Report		Stadium: Kyocera Stadium

==== XX Commonwealth Games ====
24 July 2014 Group Stage	Australia	4–0	Malaysia	Glasgow, Scotland
09:00	Kenny 7'; White 20'; Parker 30', 49'	Report		Stadium: Glasgow National Hockey Centre

25 July 2014 Group Stage	Australia	9–0	Wales	Glasgow, Scotland
14:00	Kenny 12', 22', 26'; Parker 14', 45', 50'; Smith 25'; Peris 40'; Nanscawen 53'	Report		Stadium: Glasgow National Hockey Centre

27 July 2014 Group Stage	Scotland	0–9	Australia	Glasgow, Scotland
09:00		Report	Kenny 3', 20', 47'; Nelson 19'; Flanagan 53', 60'; Nanscawen 55'; Smith 63'; Taylor 67'	Stadium: Glasgow National Hockey Centre

28 July 2014 Group Stage	Australia	3–0	England	Glasgow, Scotland
14:00	Kenny 12', 50'; Smith 13'	Report		Stadium: Glasgow National Hockey Centre

1 August 2014 Semi-finals	Australia	7–1	South Africa	Glasgow, Scotland
12:15	Smith 17'; White 21', 47'; Parker 49', 57'; Claxton 50'; Nanscawen 67'	Report	Evans 53'	Stadium: Glasgow National Hockey Centre

2 August 2014 Gold Medal Match	Australia	1–1 (3–1 p)	England	Glasgow, Scotland
20:15	Kenny 70'	Report	Owsley 48'	Stadium: Glasgow National Hockey Centre
	Penalties
	Eastham (penalty shoot-out scored); White (penalty shoot-out missed); Parker (penalty shoot-out scored); Kenny (penalty shoot-out missed); Blyth (penalty shoot-out scored)		(penalty shoot-out scored) Twigg; (penalty shoot-out missed) Danson; (penalty shoot-out missed) Gilbert; (penalty shoot-out missed) White

==== New Zealand Test Series ====
15 November 2014 Test Match	New Zealand	2–2	Australia	Wellington, New Zealand
15:00	Hayward 5'; Cocks 32'	Report	McMahon 35', 58'

16 November 2014 Test Match	New Zealand	2–3	Australia	Wellington, New Zealand
15:00	Punt 33'; Webster 44'	Report	Smith 14', 60+'; Slattery 33'

18 November 2014 Test Match	New Zealand	3–3	Australia	Wellington, New Zealand
19:00	Michelsen 3', 50'; Merry 18'	Report	Kenny 24'; Slattery 27'; Nelson 60+'

==== Champions Trophy ====
29 November 2014 Group Stage	Australia	2–1	England	Mendoza, Argentina
16:30	Kenny 6', 55'	Report	Watton 40'	Stadium: Estadio Mendocino de Hockey

30 November 2014 Group Stage	Argentina	1–1	Australia	Mendoza, Argentina
19:00	Aymar 52'	Report	Smith 27'	Stadium: Estadio Mendocino de Hockey

2 December 2014 Group Stage	Australia	3–1	Germany	Mendoza, Argentina
13:00	Nanscawen 17'; Kenny 32'; Smith 45'	Report	Hauke 60'	Stadium: Estadio Mendocino de Hockey

4 December 2014 Quarterfinals	Australia	4–1	Japan	Mendoza, Argentina
15:30	Nanscawen 4'; Kenny 7', 9'; Flanagan 54'	Report	Otsuka 51'	Stadium: Estadio Mendocino de Hockey

6 December 2014 Semi-finals	New Zealand	1–1 (0–3 p)	Australia	Mendoza, Argentina
16:30	Punt 2'	Report	Spence 40'	Stadium: Estadio Mendocino de Hockey
	Penalties
	Michelsen (penalty shoot-out missed); Punt (penalty shoot-out missed); Gunson (penalty shoot-out missed)		(penalty shoot-out scored) Nanscawen; (penalty shoot-out missed) Eastham; (penalty shoot-out scored) McMahon; (penalty shoot-out scored) Smith

7 December 2014 Gold Medal Match	Australia	1–1 (1–3 p)	Argentina	Mendoza, Argentina
19:00	Slattery 35'	Report	F. Habif 39'	Stadium: Estadio Mendocino de Hockey
	Penalties
	Nanscawen (penalty shoot-out missed); Eastham (penalty shoot-out scored); McMahon (penalty shoot-out missed); E. Smith (penalty shoot-out missed)		(penalty shoot-out scored) Aymar; (penalty shoot-out scored) Rebecchi; (penalty shoot-out scored) D'Elía; (penalty shoot-out missed) Merino

=== 2015 Results ===
2015 Statistics
Pld	W	D	L	GF	GA	GD	Pts
27	14	8	5	77	34	+43	64

==== China Test Series ====
2 April 2015 Test Match	Australia	1–4	China	Sydney, Australia
19:00	Smith 47'	Report	Cui 2'; Wang M. 26'; Bao 43'; Liang 50'	Stadium: Sydney Olympic Park

4 April 2015 Test Match	Australia	1–1	China	Sydney, Australia
15:00	Nanscawen 28'	Report	Zhang 12'	Stadium: Sydney Olympic Park

5 April 2015 Test Match	Australia	3–2	China	Sydney, Australia
15:00	Williams 36'; Kenny 52', 56'	Report	Xi 22'; Zhang 37'	Stadium: Sydney Olympic Park

==== Hawke's Bay Cup ====
11 April 2015 Group Stage	Australia	1–1	United States	Hastings, New Zealand
15:30	Smith 42'	Report	Gonzalez 22'	Stadium: Hawke's Bay Sports Park

12 April 2015 Group Stage	China	2–2	Australia	Hastings, New Zealand
15:30	Peng 26'; Xi 35'	Report	Blyth 4'; Kenny 30'	Stadium: Hawke's Bay Sports Park

14 April 2015 Group Stage	Australia	0–0	India	Hastings, New Zealand
19:30		Report		Stadium: Hawke's Bay Sports Park

16 April 2015 Quarterfinals	Argentina	0–1	Australia	Hastings, New Zealand
15:45		Report	Slattery 4'	Stadium: Hawke's Bay Sports Park

18 April 2015 Semi-finals	China	2–3	Australia	Hastings, New Zealand
18:45	Wang 20'; Qian 55'	Report	Blyth 11'; Kenny 42'; Parker 51'	Stadium: Hawke's Bay Sports Park

19 April 2015 Final	Australia	3–2	New Zealand	Hastings, New Zealand
18:45	Smith 40'; Peris 43'; Kenny 60'	Report	Flynn 1'; Merry 44'	Stadium: Hawke's Bay Sports Park

==== Hockey World League Semifinals ====
21 June 2015 Group Stage	Australia	9–0	Poland	Antwerp, Belgium
10:00	Kenny 9', 22', 35', 44'; Parker 20'; Smith 25'; Slattery 42'; Nanscawen 54'; Blyth 57'	Report		Stadium: KHC Dragons

24 June 2015 Group Stage	Belgium	0–2	Australia	Antwerp, Belgium
18:00		Report	Kenny 9'; McMahon 41'	Stadium: KHC Dragons

25 June 2015 Group Stage	Australia	0–2	New Zealand	Antwerp, Belgium
20:00		Report	Punt 33'; Gunson 54'	Stadium: KHC Dragons

27 June 2015 Group Stage	Australia	4–2	India	Antwerp, Belgium
18:00	Kenny 2', 6', 33', 44'	Report	Kataria 5'; P. Rani 33'	Stadium: KHC Dragons

30 June 2015 Quarterfinals	Australia	2–0	Italy	Antwerp, Belgium
13:00	Kenny 21'; Flanagan 40'	Report		Stadium: KHC Dragons

2 July 2015 Semi-finals	Netherlands	5–1	Australia	Antwerp, Belgium
18:00	Dirkse van den Heuvel 14'; Paumen 15'; Zerbo 20'; Welten 45'; Bos 53'	Report	Slattery 30'	Stadium: KHC Dragons

4 July 2015 3rd Place Match	Australia	4–2	New Zealand	Antwerp, Belgium
15:30	Smith 3'; Claxton 4'; Williams 15'; Nanscawen 45'	Report	Michelsen 34'; Punt 48'	Stadium: KHC Dragons

==== Korea Test Series ====
5 September 2015 Test Match	Australia	0–0	South Korea	Perth, Australia
14:15		Report

6 September 2015 Test Match	Australia	5–1	South Korea	Perth, Australia
14:15	Smith 6', 55'; Slattery 15'; Kershaw 18'; M. Fitzpatrick 39'	Report	Kim Bo-mi 36'

8 September 2015 Test Match	Australia	2–0	South Korea	Perth, Australia
17:00	Slattery 19'; Nance 22'	Report

==== Oceania Cup ====
22 October 2015 Group Stage	Australia	25–0	Samoa	Stratford, New Zealand
13:30	Kenny 5', 18', 34'; Nelson 9', 29', 54'; Barden 9', 35'; Kershaw 9'; Smith 10', 31', 49', 55'; Claxton 13', 56'; Flanagan 14'; Peris 26', 37', 54'; Blyth 34'; McMahon 39'; Morgan 43'; Fitzpatrick 44', 50'; Williams 57'	Report

24 October 2015 Group Stage	New Zealand	2–2	Australia	Stratford, New Zealand
13:45	Pearce 17'; Merry 39'	Report	Slattery 14'; Kenny 56'

25 October 2015 Final	New Zealand	1–1 (1–2 p)	Australia	Stratford, New Zealand
13:45	Webster 9'	Report	Barden 23'
	Penalties
	Michelsen (penalty shoot-out missed); Gunson (penalty shoot-out missed); Charlton (penalty shoot-out missed); Harrison (penalty shoot-out scored); Merry (penalty shoot-out missed)		(penalty shoot-out missed) Smith; (penalty shoot-out missed) McMahon; (penalty shoot-out scored) Kenny; (penalty shoot-out scored) Williams

==== Hockey World League Final ====
5 December 2015 Group Stage	Australia	1–0	China	Rosario, Argentina
18:45	Morgan 43'	Report

6 December 2015 Group Stage	Argentina	1–2	Australia	Rosario, Argentina
21:00	Merino 4'	Report	Kenny 53'; Morgan 60+'

8 December 2015 Group Stage	Australia	0–1	Great Britain	Rosario, Argentina
14:15		Report	H. Richardson-Walsh 26'

10 December 2015 Quarterfinals	Australia	2–2 (1–2 p)	Germany	Rosario, Argentina
18:30	Nanscawen 22'; Slattery 25'	Report	Altenburg 44', 60'
	Penalties
	Blyth (penalty shoot-out scored); Nanscawen (penalty shoot-out missed); Dwyer (penalty shoot-out missed); Williams (penalty shoot-out missed); Kenny (penalty shoot-out missed)		(penalty shoot-out scored) Müller; (penalty shoot-out missed) Mävers; (penalty shoot-out scored) Altenburg; (penalty shoot-out missed) Teschke

12 December 2015 5th Place Match	Netherlands	1–0	Australia	Rosario, Argentina
14:00	Welten 42'	Report
