= 2012 Women's Four Nations Hockey Tournament (Auckland) =

Four Nations
Tournament details
- Host country: New Zealand
- City: Auckland
- Teams: 4 (from 3 confederations)
- Venue(s): Lloyd Elsmore Hockey Stadium

Final positions
- Champions: Australia (1st title)
- Runner-up: New Zealand
- Third place: India

Tournament statistics
- Matches played: 8
- Goals scored: 38 (4.75 per match)
- Top scorer(s): (Australia) Georgia Nanscawen (Australia) Jodie Schulz (4 goals)

The 2012 Women's Four Nations Hockey Tournament was the second of two women's field hockey tournaments, consisting of a series of test matches. It was held in Auckland, New Zealand, from April 18 to 22, 2012, and featured four of the top nations in women's field hockey.

== Competition format ==
The tournament featured the national teams of Australia, India, the United States, and the hosts, New Zealand, competing in a round-robin format, with each team playing each other once. Three points will be awarded for a win, one for a draw, and none for a loss.

Country	October 2011 FIH Ranking	Best World Cup finish	Best Olympic Games finish
Australia	7	Champions (1994, 1998)	Champions (1988, 1996, 2000)
India	13	Fourth Place (1974)	Fourth Place (1980)
New Zealand	6	Fourth Place (1986)	Sixth Place (1984, 2000, 2004)
United States	10	Third place (1994)	Third place (1984)

== Officials ==
The following umpires were appointed by the International Hockey Federation to officiate the tournament:

- Sarah Allanson (AUS)
- Maggie Giddens (USA)
- Melanie Oakden (NZL)
- Anupama Puchimanda (IND)
- Dino Willox (WAL)

== Results ==
All times are local (New Zealand Standard Time).

=== Preliminary round ===
Pos	Team	Pld	W	D	L	GF	GA	GD	Pts	Qualification
1	Australia	3	2	1	0	13	6	+7	7	Advanced to Final
2	New Zealand (H)	3	1	2	0	9	8	+1	5	Advanced to Final
3	United States	3	1	0	2	6	8	−2	3	
4	India	3	0	1	2	5	11	−6	1	

Source: New Zealand Hockey Federation
Rules for classification: 1) points; 2) goal difference; 3) goals scored; 4) head-to-head result.
(H) Hosts

==== Fixtures ====
18 April 2012
13:00

United States	3–0	India
Taylor 32'; Selenski 48'; Cesan 51'	Report

Umpires:
Melanie Oakden (NZL)
Sarah Allanson (AUS)

18 April 2012
15:00

New Zealand	3–3	Australia
Punt 7', 70'; Sharland 55'	Report	Smith 15'; Schulz 44'; Nanscawen 48'

Umpires:
Dino Willox (WAL)
Anupama Puchimanda (IND)

19 April 2012
13:00

Australia	5–2	India
Schulz 2', 28'; Boyce 6'; Nelson 51'; Nanscawen 60'	Report	Rani 13'; Poonam 63'

Umpires:
Maggie Giddens (USA)
Melanie Oakden (NZL)

19 April 2012
15:00

United States	2–3	New Zealand
Dawson 15'; Smith 55'	Report	C. Harrison 20'; Flynn 31'; Glynn 40'

Umpires:
Dino Willox (WAL)
Anupama Puchimanda (IND)

21 April 2012
17:30

Australia	5–1	United States
Schulz 2'; Nanscawen 12'; Close 43', 47'; Attard 6'	Report	Laubach 16'

Umpires:
Anupama Puchimanda (IND)
Dino Willox (WAL)

21 April 2012
19:30

New Zealand	3–3	India
Glynn 6'; Finlayson 10'; Forgesson 67'	Report	Rani 15'; Vandana 55'; Chanchan 56'

Umpires:
Sarah Allanson (AUS)
Maggie Giddens (USA)

=== Classification round ===
==== Third and fourth place ====
22 April 2012
17:00

United States	0–1	India
	Report	Deepika 40'

Umpires:
Melanie Oakden (NZL)
Sarah Allanson (AUS)

===== Final =====
22 April 2012
19:30

Australia	3–1	New Zealand
Nelson 7'; Close 8'; Nanscawen 15'	Report	Glynn 49'

Umpires:
Maggie Giddens (USA)
Dino Willox (WAL)

== Statistics ==
=== Final standings ===
Pos	Team	Pld	W	D	L	GF	GA	GD	Pts	Status
1st place, gold medalist(s)	Australia	4	3	1	0	16	7	+9	10	Tournament Champion
2nd place, silver medalist(s)	New Zealand (H)	4	1	2	1	10	11	−1	5	
3rd place, bronze medalist(s)	India	4	1	1	2	6	11	−5	4	
4	United States	4	1	0	3	6	9	−3	3	

Source: New Zealand Hockey Federation
(H) Hosts

=== Goalscorers ===
There were 38 goals scored in 8 matches, for an average of 4.75 goals per match.

4 goals

- (Australia) Georgia Nanscawen
- (Australia) Jodie Schulz

3 goals

- (Australia) Jade Close
- (New Zealand) Katie Glynn

2 goals

- (Australia) Ashleigh Nelson
- (India) Rani Rampal
- (New Zealand) Anita Punt

1 goal

- (Australia) Teneal Attard
- (Australia) Fiona Boyce
- (Australia) Emily Smith
- (India) Vandana Kataria
- (India) Poonam Rani
- (India) Deepika Thakur
- (India) Chanchan Thokchom
- (New Zealand) Cathryn Finlayson
- (New Zealand) Gemma Flynn
- (New Zealand) Krystal Forgesson
- (New Zealand) Charlotte Harrison
- (New Zealand) Kayla Sharland
- (United States) Michelle Cesan
- (United States) Rachel Dawson
- (United States) Claire Laubach
- (United States) Paige Selenski
- (United States) Keli Smith
- (United States) Shannon Taylor
