= 2012 Women's Hockey Investec Cup =

Women's field hockey tournament

2012 Investec London Cup
Tournament details
- Host country: England
- City: Chiswick
- Dates: 5–9 June 2012
- Teams: 6
- Venue: Quintin Hogg Memorial Sports Ground

Final positions
- Champions: Netherlands (1st title)
- Runner-up: Australia
- Third place: Germany

Tournament statistics
- Matches played: 11
- Goals scored: 46 (4.18 per match)
- Top scorer(s): (Netherlands) Kelly Jonker (Netherlands) Maartje Paumen (5 goals)

The 2012 Investec London Cup was a women's field hockey tournament held at the Quintin Hogg Memorial Sports Ground. It took place between 5–9 June 2012 in Chiswick, England. A total of six teams competed for the title.

The Netherlands won the tournament by defeating Australia 4–1 in the final. Germany won the bronze medal by defeating South Africa 6–2 in the third and fourth playoff, while Great Britain finished 5th by defeating Ireland 3–0.

== Teams ==
- Australia
- Germany
- Great Britain
- Ireland
- Netherlands
- South Africa

== Results ==
=== First round ===
==== Pool A ====
Pos	Team	Pld	W	D	L	GF	GA	GD	Pts	Qualification
1	Netherlands	2	2	0	0	7	1	+6	6	Semi-Finals
2	Australia	2	1	0	1	5	3	+2	3	Semi-Finals
3	Ireland	2	0	0	2	1	9	−8	0	

Source: greatbritainhockey
Rules for classification: 1) points; 2) goal difference; 3) goals scored; 4) head-to-head result.

5 June 2012
14:00

Netherlands	2–1	Australia
Paumen 49', 52'	Report	Smith 46'

Quintin Hogg Memorial Sports Ground
Umpires:
Frances Block (ENG)
Wendy Stewart (CAN)

6 June 2012
17:30

Australia	4–1	Ireland
Boyce 3'; Smith 10'; Schulz 19'; Eastham 48'	Report	Daly 55'

Quintin Hogg Memorial Sports Ground
Umpires:
Lesley Pieterse (RSA)
Gabriele Schmitz (GER)

7 June 2012
17:30

Ireland	0–5	Netherlands
	Report	Jonker 32', 38', 67'; Agliotti 50'; Hoog 65'

Quintin Hogg Memorial Sports Ground
Umpires:
Gabriele Schmitz (GER)
Wendy Stewart (CAN)

==== Pool B ====
Pos	Team	Pld	W	D	L	GF	GA	GD	Pts	Qualification
1	Germany	2	2	0	0	3	1	+2	6	Semi-Finals
2	South Africa	2	1	0	1	3	2	+1	3	Semi-Finals
3	Great Britain	2	0	0	2	2	5	−3	0	

Source: greatbritainhockey
Rules for classification: 1) points; 2) goal difference; 3) goals scored; 4) head-to-head result.

5 June 2012
16:30

Great Britain	1–3	South Africa
Gilbert 65'	Report	Damons 5'; Coston 10'; Wilson 58'

Quintin Hogg Memorial Sports Ground
Umpires:
Carol Metchette (IRL)
Kylie Seymour (AUS)

6 June 2012
20:00

South Africa	0–1	Germany
	Report	Hoffmann 30'

Quintin Hogg Memorial Sports Ground
Umpires:
Kylie Seymour (AUS)
Fanneke Alkemade (NED)

7 June 2012
20:00

Germany	2–1	Great Britain
Krüger 27'; Beermann 29'	Report	MacLeod 59'

Quintin Hogg Memorial Sports Ground
Umpires:
Carol Metchette (IRL)
Fanneke Alkemade (NED)

=== Second round ===
==== Fifth and Sixth place ====
10 June 2012
10:30

Ireland	0–3	Great Britain
	Report	MacLeod 11', 15'; Maguire 59'

Quintin Hogg Memorial Sports Ground
Umpires:
Lesley Pieterse (RSA)
Gabriele Schmitz (GER)

==== First to fourth place classification ====
Semi-Finals
9 June 2012
Netherlands (p.s.o)	2 (4)
South Africa	2 (2)
9 June 2012
Germany	2
Australia	3

Final
10 June 2012
Netherlands	4
Australia	1
Third and fourth place
10 June 2012
South Africa	2
Germany	6

===== Semi-finals =====
9 June 2012
14:30

Netherlands	2–2	South Africa
Jonker 3'; Paumen 10'	Report	Coetzee 32', 55'
Penalties
van As (penalty shoot-out scored); Paumen (penalty shoot-out scored); Bos (penalty shoot-out scored) de Goede (penalty shoot-out scored)	4–2	(penalty shoot-out scored) Chamberlain; (penalty shoot-out scored) Marescia; (penalty shoot-out missed) George; (penalty shoot-out missed) Bright

Quintin Hogg Memorial Sports Ground
Umpires:
Frances Block (ENG)
Kylie Seymour (AUS)

9 June 2012
17:00

Germany	2–3	Australia
Stockel 5'; Hoffmann 49'	Report	Smith 54'; McGurk 65'; Flanagan 70'

Quintin Hogg Memorial Sports Ground
Umpires:
Wendy Stewart (CAN)
Lesley Pieterse (RSA)

===== Third and fourth place =====
10 June 2012
13:30

South Africa	2–6	Germany
Chamberlain 11'; Coetzee 67'	Report	Keller 9'; Hillmann 18'; Muller 40'; Beermann 47', 58'; Otte 62'

Quintin Hogg Memorial Sports Ground
Umpires:
Fanneke Alkemade (NED)
Frances Block (ENG)

===== Final =====
10 June 2012
16:00

Netherlands	4–1	Australia
Dirkse van den Heuvel 28'; Paumen 44', 56'; Jonker 46'	Report	Nanscawen 47'

Quintin Hogg Memorial Sports Ground
Umpires:
Carol Metchette (IRL)
Wendy Stewart (CAN)

== Statistics ==
=== Final standings ===
Pos	Team	Pld	W	D	L	GF	GA	GD	Pts	Final Result
1st place, gold medalist(s)	Netherlands	4	3	1	0	13	4	+9	10	Gold Medal
2nd place, silver medalist(s)	Australia	4	2	0	2	9	9	0	6	Silver Medal
3rd place, bronze medalist(s)	Germany	4	3	0	1	11	6	+5	9	Bronze Medal
4	South Africa	4	1	1	2	7	10	−3	4	Fourth Place
5	Great Britain	3	1	0	2	5	5	0	3	Fifth place
6	Ireland	3	0	0	3	1	12	−11	0	Sixth Place

Source: greatbritainhockey

=== Goalscorers ===
5 Goals

- (Netherlands) Kelly Jonker
- (Netherlands) Maartje Paumen

3 Goals

- (Australia) Emily Smith
- (Germany) Janine Beermann
- (United Kingdom) Hannah MacLeod
- (South Africa) Pietie Coetzee

2 Goals

- (Germany) Eileen Hoffmann

1 Goal

- (Australia) Fiona Boyce
- (Australia) Casey Eastham
- (Australia) Anna Flanagan
- (Australia) Kobie McGurk
- (Australia) Georgia Nanscawen
- (Australia) Jodie Schulz
- (Germany) Kristina Hillmann
- (Germany) Natascha Keller
- (Germany) Hannah Krüger
- (Germany) Julia Muller
- (Germany) Katharina Otte
- (Germany) Maike Stockel
- (United Kingdom) Susie Gilbert
- (United Kingdom) Emily Maguire
- (Ireland) Nicola Daly
- (Netherlands) Marilyn Agliotti
- (Netherlands) Carlien Dirkse van den Heuvel
- (Netherlands) Ellen Hoog
- (South Africa) Dirkie Chamberlain
- (South Africa) Bernadette Coston
- (South Africa) Sulette Damons
- (South Africa) Jennifer Wilson
