= 2011 Women's Four Nations Hockey Tournament (Mendoza) =

Four Nations
Tournament details
- Host country: Argentina
- City: Mendoza
- Teams: 4 (from 3 confederations)
- Venue: Ciudad de Godoy Cruz Stadium

Final positions
- Champions: Australia (1st title)
- Runner-up: Argentina
- Third place: United States

Tournament statistics
- Matches played: 8
- Goals scored: 25 (3.13 per match)
- Top scorer: (Argentina) Noel Barrionuevo (3 goals)

The 2011 Women's Four Nations Hockey Tournament was the first of two women's field hockey tournaments, consisting of a series of test matches. It was held in Mendoza, Argentina, from February 9 to 13, 2011, and featured four of the top nations in women's field hockey.

== Competition format ==
The tournament featured the national teams of Australia, Germany, the United States, and the hosts, Argentina, competing in a round-robin format, with each team playing each other once. Three points will be awarded for a win, one for a draw, and none for a loss.

Country	December 2010 FIH Ranking	Best World Cup finish	Best Olympic Games finish
Argentina	1	Champions (2002, 2010)	Runners-Up (2000)
Australia	7	Champions (1994, 1998)	Champions (1988, 1996, 2000)
Germany	3	Champions (1976, 1981)	Champions (2004)
United States	11	Third place (1994)	Third place (1984)

== Officials ==
The following umpires were appointed by the International Hockey Federation to officiate the tournament:

- Amy Hassick (USA)
- Catalina Montesino Wenzel (CHL)
- Mercedes Sánchez (ARG)
- Gaby Schmitz (GER)
- Kylie Seymour (AUS)

== Results ==
All times are local (Argentina Standard Time).

=== Preliminary round ===
Pos	Team	Pld	W	D	L	GF	GA	GD	Pts	Qualification
1	Argentina (H)	3	2	1	0	8	1	+7	7	Advanced to Final
2	Australia	3	1	2	0	3	2	+1	5	Advanced to Final
3	Germany	3	1	1	1	4	4	0	4	
4	United States	3	0	0	3	1	9	−8	0	

Source: Deutshcer Hockey-Bund
Rules for classification: 1) points; 2) goal difference; 3) goals scored; 4) head-to-head result.
(H) Hosts

==== Fixtures ====
9 February 2011
19:00

Australia	1–1	Germany
Close 28'	Report	Hoffmann 11'

Umpires:
Catalina Montesino Wenzel (CHL)
Amy Hassick (USA)

9 February 2011
21:30

Argentina	5–0	United States
Barrionuevo 14'; Dupuy 16', 31'; Sánchez Moccia 25'; Rebecchi 29'	Report

Umpires:
Kylie Seymour (AUS)
Gaby Schmitz (GER)

10 February 2011
19:00

Germany	0–2	Argentina
	Report	Barrionuevo 36'; Luchetti 41'

Umpires:
Amy Hassick (USA)
Kylie Seymour (AUS)

10 February 2011
21:00

Australia	1–0	United States
Olivieri 47'	Report

Umpires:
Mercedes Sánchez (ARG)
Catalina Montesino Wenzel (CHL)

12 February 2011
19:00

Germany	3–1	United States
Wilde 5'; Karwatzky 19'; Müller 55'	Report	Speuhler 7'

Umpires:
Catalina Montesino Wenzel (CHL)
Mercedes Sánchez (ARG)

12 February 2011
21:00

Argentina	1–1	Australia
Barrionuevo 54'	Report	Eastham 52'

Umpires:
Gaby Schmitz (GER)
Amy Hassick (USA)

=== Classification round ===
==== Third and fourth place ====
13 February 2011
16:30

Germany	2–2	United States
Frank 22'; Hoffmann 55'	Report	Selenski 38'; Albini 61'
Penalties
	2–3

Umpires:
Kylie Seymour (AUS)
Mercedes Sánchez (ARG)

==== Final ====
13 February 2011
19:00

Argentina	2–3 (a.e.t.)	Australia
Merino 46'; Rebecchi 58'	Report	Nelson 8'; Schulz 70', 71'

Umpires:
Catalina Montesino Wenzel (CHL)
Gaby Schmitz (GER)

== Statistics ==
=== Final standings ===
Pos	Team	Pld	W	D	L	GF	GA	GD	Pts	Status
1st place, gold medalist(s)	Australia	4	2	2	0	6	4	+2	8	Tournament Champion
2nd place, silver medalist(s)	Argentina (H)	4	2	1	1	10	4	+6	7	
3rd place, bronze medalist(s)	United States	4	0	1	3	3	11	−8	1	
4	Germany	4	1	2	1	6	6	0	5	

Source: Deutshcer Hockey-Bund
(H) Hosts

=== Goalscorers ===
There were 25 goals scored in 8 matches, for an average of 3.12 goals per match.

3 goals

- (Argentina) Noel Barrionuevo

2 goals

- (Argentina) Carla Dupuy
- (Argentina) Carla Rebecchi
- (Australia) Jodie Schulz
- (Germany) Eileen Hoffmann

1 goal

- (Argentina) Rosario Luchetti
- (Argentina) Delfina Merino
- (Argentina) Rocío Sánchez Moccia
- (Australia) Jade Close
- (Australia) Casey Eastham
- (Australia) Ashleigh Nelson
- (Australia) Kandice Olivieri
- (Germany) Eva Frank
- (Germany) Julie Karwatzky
- (Germany) Julia Müller
- (Germany) Céline Wilde
- (United States) Torrie Albini
- (United States) Paige Selenski
- (United States) Pamela Speuhler
