= 2012 Women's Four Nations Hockey Tournament (North Harbour) =

Four Nations
Tournament details
- Host country: New Zealand
- City: North Shore
- Teams: 4 (from 3 confederations)
- Venue(s): North Harbour Hockey Stadium

Final positions
- Champions: New Zealand (1st title)
- Runner-up: Australia
- Third place: United States

Tournament statistics
- Matches played: 8
- Goals scored: 26 (3.25 per match)
- Top scorer(s): (New Zealand) Katie Glynn (5 goals)

The 2012 Women's Four Nations Hockey Tournament was the first of two women's field hockey tournaments, consisting of a series of test matches. It was held on the North Shore, from April 12 to 16, 2012, and featured four of the top nations in women's field hockey.

== Competition format ==
The tournament featured the national teams of Australia, India, the United States, and the hosts, New Zealand, competing in a round-robin format, with each team playing each other once. Three points will be awarded for a win, one for a draw, and none for a loss.

Country	October 2011 FIH Ranking	Best World Cup finish	Best Olympic Games finish
Australia	7	Champions (1994, 1998)	Champions (1988, 1996, 2000)
India	13	Fourth Place (1974)	Fourth Place (1980)
New Zealand	6	Fourth Place (1986)	Sixth Place (1984, 2000, 2004)
United States	10	Third place (1994)	Third place (1984)

== Officials ==
The following umpires were appointed by the International Hockey Federation to officiate the tournament:

- Sarah Allanson (AUS)
- Maggie Giddens (USA)
- Melanie Oakden (NZL)
- Anupama Puchimanda (IND)
- Dino Willox (WAL)

== Results ==
All times are local (New Zealand Standard Time).

=== Preliminary round ===
Pos	Team	Pld	W	D	L	GF	GA	GD	Pts	Qualification
1	Australia	3	3	0	0	8	1	+7	9	Advanced to Final
2	New Zealand (H)	3	2	0	1	6	5	+1	6	Advanced to Final
3	India	3	0	1	2	2	4	−2	1	
4	United States	3	0	1	2	2	8	−6	1	

Source: New Zealand Hockey Federation
Rules for classification: 1) points; 2) goal difference; 3) goals scored; 4) head-to-head result.
(H) Hosts

==== Fixtures ====
12 April 2012
16:30

Australia	4–0	United States
Schulz 19'; Rivers 22'; Nanscawen 43'; Eastham 64'	Report

Umpires:
Melanie Oakden (NZL)
Dino Willox (WAL)

12 April 2012
18:30

New Zealand	2–1	India
Punt 3'; Glynn 24'	Report	Anuradha 40'

Umpires:
Sarah Allanson (AUS)
Maggie Giddens (USA)

13 April 2012
16:30

United States	1–1	India
O'Donnell 66'	Report	Deepika 27'

Umpires:
Melanie Oakden (NZL)
Sarah Allanson (AUS)

13 April 2012
18:30

New Zealand	1–3	Australia
Glynn 34'	Report	Boyce 33'; Schulz 57'; Nelson 62'

Umpires:
Dino Willox (WAL)
Anupama Puchimanda (IND)

15 April 2012
16:30

Australia	1–0	India
Nanscawen 6'	Report

Umpires:
Maggie Giddens (USA)
Melanie Oakden (NZL)

15 April 2012
18:30

United States	1–3	New Zealand
Taylor 33'	Report	C. Harrison 23'; Glynn 43', 58'

Umpires:
Anupama Puchimanda (IND)
Dino Willox (WAL)

=== Classification round ===
==== Third and fourth place ====
16 April 2012
16:00

India	1–2 (a.e.t.)	United States
Chanchan 56'	Report	Taylor 47'; Crandall 73'

Umpires:
Sarah Allanson (AUS)
Dino Willox (WAL)

==== Final ====
16 April 2012
18:30

Australia	2–3	New Zealand
Flanagan 51'; Schulz 64'	Report	Sharland 12'; Glynn 43'; S. Harrison 54'

Umpires:
Maggie Giddens (USA)
Anupama Puchimanda (IND)

== Statistics ==
=== Final standings ===
Pos	Team	Pld	W	D	L	GF	GA	GD	Pts	Status
1st place, gold medalist(s)	New Zealand (H)	4	3	0	1	9	7	+2	9	Tournament Champion
2nd place, silver medalist(s)	Australia	4	3	0	1	10	4	+6	9	
3rd place, bronze medalist(s)	United States	4	1	1	2	4	9	−5	4	
4	India	4	0	1	3	3	6	−3	1	

Source: New Zealand Hockey Federation
(H) Hosts

=== Goalscorers ===
There were 26 goals scored in 8 matches, for an average of 3.25 goals per match.

5 goals

- (New Zealand) Katie Glynn

3 goals

- (Australia) Jodie Schulz

2 goals

- (Australia) Georgia Nanscawen
- (United States) Shannon Taylor

1 goal

- (Australia) Fiona Boyce
- (Australia) Casey Eastham
- (Australia) Anna Flanagan
- (Australia) Ashleigh Nelson
- (Australia) Megan Rivers
- (India) Deepika Thakur
- (India) Anuradha Thokchom
- (India) Chanchan Thokchom
- (New Zealand) Charlotte Harrison
- (New Zealand) Samantha Harrison
- (New Zealand) Anita Punt
- (New Zealand) Kayla Sharland
- (United States) Lauren Crandall
- (United States) Kathleen O'Donnell
