= 2013 Women's Hockey Investec Cup =

2013 Investec Cup
Tournament details
- Host country: South Africa
- City: Cape Town
- Dates: 4–10 February
- Teams: 4 (from 3 confederations)
- Venue: Hartleyvale Stadium

Final positions
- Champions: Netherlands (2nd title)
- Runner-up: South Africa
- Third place: England

Tournament statistics
- Matches played: 10
- Goals scored: 40 (4 per match)
- Top scorer: (Netherlands) Maartje Paumen (7 goals)

The 2013 Investec Cup was a women's field hockey tournament held at Hartleyvale Stadium. It took place between 4–10 February 2013 in Cape Town, South Africa. A total of four teams competed for the title.

The Netherlands won the tournament by defeating South Africa 4–2 in the final. England won the bronze medal by defeating Australia 3–2 in a penalty shoot-out following a 2–2 draw.

== Participating nations ==
A total of four teams competed for the title:

- Australia
- England
- Netherlands
- South Africa

== Results ==
=== Pool matches ===
Pos	Team	Pld	W	D	L	GF	GA	GD	Pts
1	Netherlands	3	2	1	0	9	4	+5	7
2	Australia	3	1	2	0	6	4	+2	5
3	South Africa	3	1	1	1	6	5	+1	4
4	England	3	0	0	3	3	11	−8	0

Source: FIH
Rules for classification: 1) points; 2) goal difference; 3) goals scored; 4) head-to-head result.

4 February 2013
18:00

Netherlands	2–2	Australia
Paumen 41'; Jonker 65'	Report	Eastham 9'; Nanscawen 56'

Umpires:
Valentina Tomasi (ITA)
Tanja Schafer (RSA)

4 February 2013
20:00

South Africa	4–1	England
Coetzee 5', 46'; Bright 33'; Marescia 50'	Report	Newton 66'

Umpires:
Kylie Seymour (AUS)
Alwiene Sterk (NED)

5 February 2013
18:00

Netherlands	4–1	England
van Male 24'; Paumen 27', 38'; Drost 39'	Report	Bray 4'

Umpires:
Kylie Seymour (AUS)
Tanja Schafer (RSA)

5 February 2013
20:00

South Africa	1–1	Australia
Mayne 59'	Report	Flanagan 51'

Umpires:
Emma Shelbourn (ENG)
Alwiene Sterk (NED)

7 February 2013
18:00

England	1–3	Australia
White 68'	Report	Flanagan 15'; Schulz 41'; Nanscawen 58'

Umpires:
Tanja Schafer (RSA)
Valentina Tomasi (ITA)

7 February 2013
20:00

South Africa	1–3	Netherlands
Marescia 68'	Report	van den Assem 15'; Paumen 39', 48'

Umpires:
Emma Shelbourn (ENG)
Kylie Seymour (AUS)

=== Classification matches ===
Semi-Finals
9 February 2013
Netherlands	3
England	0
9 February 2013
Australia	1
South Africa	2

Final
10 February 2013
Netherlands	4
South Africa	2
Third and fourth place
10 February 2013
England (p.s.o)	2 (3)
Australia	2 (2)

==== Semi-finals ====
9 February 2013
14:30

Netherlands	3–0	England
Paumen 56', 69'; Hoog 65'	Report

Umpires:
Valentina Tomasi (ITA)
Kylie Seymour (AUS)

9 February 2013
17:00

Australia	1–2	South Africa
Eastham 70'	Report	Coetzee 12', 35'

Umpires:
Emma Shelbourn (ENG)
Alwiene Sterk (NED)

==== Third and fourth place ====
10 February 2013
11:30

England	2–2	Australia
Bray 44'; Gilbert 68'	Report	Boyce 24'; Johnson 52'
Penalties
	3–2

Umpires:
Tanja Schafer (RSA)
Alwiene Sterk (NED)

==== Final ====
10 February 2013
14:00

Netherlands	4–2	South Africa
Drost 7' van Male 23'; Verschoor 55'; Vega 70'	Report	Deetlefs 33'; Mayne 59'

Umpires:
Kylie Seymour (AUS)
Valentina Tomasi (ITA)

== Statistics ==
=== Final standings ===
Pos	Team	Pld	W	D	L	GF	GA	GD	Pts	Final Result
1st place, gold medalist(s)	Netherlands	5	4	1	0	16	6	+10	13	Gold Medal
2nd place, silver medalist(s)	South Africa	5	2	1	2	10	10	0	7	Silver Medal
3rd place, bronze medalist(s)	England	5	0	1	4	5	16	−11	1	Bronze Medal
4	Australia	5	1	3	1	9	8	+1	6	Fourth Place

Source: FIH

=== Goalscorers ===
7 Goals

- (Netherlands) Maartje Paumen

4 Goals

- (South Africa) Pietie Coetzee

2 Goals

- (Australia) Casey Eastham
- (Australia) Anna Flanagan
- (Australia) Georgia Nanscawen
- (England) Sophie Bray
- (Netherlands) Roos Drost
- (Netherlands) Kitty van Male
- (South Africa) Marsha Marescia
- (South Africa) Jade Mayne

1 Goal

- (Australia) Fiona Boyce
- (Australia) Kirstin Johnson
- (Australia) Jodie Schulz
- (England) Susie Gilbert
- (England) Dilly Newton
- (England) Nicola White
- (Netherlands) Ellen Hoog
- (Netherlands) Kelly Jonker
- (Netherlands) Ireen van den Assem
- (Netherlands) Charlotte Vega
- (Netherlands) Maria Verschoor
- (South Africa) Tarryn Bright
- (South Africa) Lisa-Marie Deetlefs
