= 2013 Women's International Super Series Hockey 9's =

Tournament details
- Host country: Australia
- City: Perth
- Dates: 17–20 October 2013
- Teams: 4
- Venue: Perth Hockey Stadium

Final positions
- Champions: Australia (3rd title)
- Runner-up: Argentina
- Third place: Canada

Tournament statistics
- Matches played: 8
- Goals scored: 49 (6.13 per match)
- Top scorer: (Australia) Madonna Blyth (5 goals)
- Best player: (Australia) Madonna Blyth

The 2013 Women's International Super Series Hockey 9's was the third and final edition of the women's field hockey tournament. The tournament was held at the Perth Hockey Stadium between 17–20 October 2013 in Perth, Australia. A total of four teams competed for the title.

The tournament was held alongside the men's competition.

Australia won the tournament by defeating Argentina 3–0 in the final. Canada won the bronze medal by defeating Malaysia 3–1 in the third and fourth playoff.

== Participating nations ==
A total of four teams competed for the title:

- Argentina
- Australia
- Canada
- Malaysia

== Competition rules ==
The International Super Series Hockey 9's has a unique set of rules varying from standard FIH regulations.

The main variations are as follows:

- Matches are played with a maximum of 9 players on the field at any time for each team
- Matches are played in 2 halves of 20 minutes
- Goals are widened by 1 metre than regulation size

== Results ==
All times are local time: (UTC+08:00).

=== Pool matches ===
Pos	Team	Pld	W	D	L	GF	GA	GD	Pts	Qualification
1	Australia	3	2	1	0	18	3	+15	7	Final
2	Argentina	3	2	1	0	17	5	+12	7	Final
3	Canada	3	1	0	2	5	12	−7	3	Third and fourth place
4	Malaysia	3	0	0	3	2	22	−20	0	Third and fourth place

Source: hockey9s.hockey.org.au
Rules for classification: 1) points; 2) goal difference; 3) goals scored; 4) head-to-head result.

17 October 2013
17:30

Argentina	4 – 1	Canada
Aymar 4', 24'; Albertario 7', 25'	Report	Donohoe 18'

Umpires:
Melissa Trivic (AUS)
Kelly Hudson (NZL)

17 October 2013
18:25

Australia	8 – 0	Malaysia
Nelson 19', 28', 35'; Taylor 26'; Blyth 30'; Peris 31'; Eastham 33'; Messent 36'	Report

Umpires:
Mercedes Sanchez (ARG)
Lelia Sacre (CAN)

18 October 2013
17:30

Argentina	10 – 1	Malaysia
Albertario 4', 33'; Scarone 7'; Rebecchi 15', 16'; Cavallero 17', 20'; Juárez 30'; D. Sruoga 36'; Merino 40'	Report	Ruhani 29'

Umpires:
Lelia Sacre (CAN)
Kelly Hudson (NZL)

18 October 2013
19:20

Australia	7 – 0	Canada
Parker 8', 34'; Blyth 13', 37', 40'; Close 23'; Peris 26'	Report

Umpires:
Mercedes Sanchez (ARG)
Nor Piza Hassan (MAS)

19 October 2013
12:15

Canada	4 – 1	Malaysia
Wishart 19'; Culley 25'; Woodcroft 29'; Raye 34'	Report	Abdul Rahman 37'

Umpires:
Melissa Trivic (AUS)
Mercedes Sanchez (ARG)

19 October 2013
13:10

Australia	3 – 3	Argentina
Parker 13'; Nelson 30'; Eastham 34'	Report	Aymar 7'; Cavallero 26'; Rebecchi 27'

Umpires:
Nor Piza Hassan (MAS)
Kelly Hudson (NZL)

=== Classification matches ===
==== Third and fourth place ====
20 October 2013
11:40

Canada	3 – 1	Malaysia
Hennig 17'; Culley 19'; Gardiner 28'	Report	Norazlin 26'

Umpires:
Melissa Trivic (AUS)
Mercedes Sanchez (ARG)

==== Final ====
20 October 2013
12:50

Australia	3 – 0	Argentina
Blyth 2'; Parker 9'; Eastham 39'	Report

Umpires:
Kelly Hudson (NZL)
Lelia Sacre (CAN)

== Statistics ==
=== Final standings ===
Pos	Team	Pld	W	D	L	GF	GA	GD	Pts	Final Result
1st place, gold medalist(s)	Australia	4	3	1	0	21	3	+18	10	Gold Medal
2nd place, silver medalist(s)	Argentina	4	2	1	1	17	8	+9	7	Silver Medal
3rd place, bronze medalist(s)	Canada	4	2	0	2	8	13	−5	6	Bronze Medal
4	Malaysia	4	0	0	4	3	25	−22	0	Fourth Place

Source: hockey9s.hockey.org.au

=== Goalscorers ===
5 Goals

- (Australia) Madonna Blyth

4 Goals

- (Argentina) Agustina Albertario
- (Australia) Ashleigh Nelson
- (Australia) Georgie Parker

3 Goals

- (Argentina) Luciana Aymar
- (Argentina) Martina Cavallero
- (Argentina) Carla Rebecchi
- (Australia) Casey Eastham

2 Goals

- (Australia) Brooke Peris
- (Canada) Thea Culley

1 Goal

- (Argentina) Gisele Juárez
- (Argentina) Delfina Merino
- (Argentina) Mariela Scarone
- (Argentina) Daniela Sruoga
- (Australia) Jade Close
- (Australia) Claire Messent
- (Australia) Jayde Taylor
- (Canada) Rachel Donohoe
- (Canada) Stephanie Gardiner
- (Canada) Danielle Hennig
- (Canada) Abigail Raye
- (Canada) Kristine Wishart
- (Canada) Amanda Woodcroft
- (Malaysia) Naida Abdul Rahman
- (Malaysia) Siti Noor Amarina Ruhani
- (Malaysia) Norazlin Sumantri
