= 2014 Hawke's Bay Cup =

Tournament details
- Host country: New Zealand
- City: Hastings
- Dates: 5–13 April
- Teams: 6
- Venue(s): Hawke's Bay Sports Park

Final positions
- Champions: Argentina (1st title)
- Runner-up: Australia
- Third place: China

Tournament statistics
- Matches played: 18
- Goals scored: 72 (4 per match)
- Top scorer(s): (Argentina) Carla Rebecchi (9 goals)

The 2014 Hawke's Bay Cup was the 1st edition of the invitational Hawke's Bay Cup competition. It took place between 5–13 April 2014 in Hastings, New Zealand. A total of six teams competed for the title.

Argentina won the tournament for the first time after defeating Australia 3–0 in the final. China won the third place match by defeating New Zealand 3–2.

== Teams ==
Including New Zealand, 6 teams were invited by the New Zealand Hockey Federation to participate in the tournament.

- Argentina
- Australia
- China
- Japan
- New Zealand
- South Korea

== Results ==
=== Preliminary round ===
==== Pool ====
Pos	Team	Pld	W	D	L	GF	GA	GD	Pts	Qualification
1	Argentina	5	5	0	0	16	3	+13	15	Final
2	Australia	5	4	0	1	14	8	+6	12	Final
3	New Zealand	5	2	0	3	14	12	+2	6	Third-place game
4	China	5	2	0	3	4	8	−4	6	Third-place game
5	South Korea	5	2	0	3	9	15	−6	6	Fifth-place game
6	Japan	5	0	0	5	4	15	−11	0	Fifth-place game

Source: FIH
Rules for classification: 1) points; 2) goal difference; 3) goals scored; 4) head-to-head result.

==== Fixtures ====
5 April 2014
12:00 (NZDT)

Japan	0–2	China
	Report	Zhang 9'; Peng 42'

Umpires:
Karen Bennett (NZL)
Kang Hyun-Hee (KOR)

5 April 2014
14:00 (NZDT)

Argentina	3–0	Australia
Aymar 17'; Juárez 30'; Rebecchi 40'	Report

Umpires:
Michelle Joubert (RSA)
Amy Baxter (USA)

5 April 2014
16:00 (NZDT)

New Zealand	3–1	South Korea
Punt 28'; Webster 34'; Merry 48'	Report	An 56'

Umpires:
Melissa Trivic (AUS)
Miao Lin (CHN)

6 April 2014
12:00 (NZDT)

Australia	1–0	Japan
Smith 19'	Report

Umpires:
Miao Lin (CHN)
Mariana Reydo (ARG)

6 April 2014
14:00 (NZDT)

South Korea	1–5	Argentina
Han 66'	Report	Merino 2', 21'; Luchetti 4'; Rebecchi 57', 67'

Umpires:
Junko Wagatsuma (JPN)
Karen Bennett (NZL)

6 April 2014
16:00 (NZDT)

New Zealand	1–2	China
Punt 37'	Report	Wang M. 46', 56'

Umpires:
Amy Baxter (USA)
Michelle Joubert (RSA)

8 April 2014
15:00 (NZST)

South Korea	3–2	Japan
Han 6'; Kim D. 55'; Cheon S. 66'	Report	Ono 35'; Ota 60'

Umpires:
Mariana Reydo (ARG)
Michelle Joubert (RSA)

8 April 2014
17:00 (NZST)

China	0–4	Australia
	Report	Nanscawen 15'; Carmichael 23'; White 59', 65'

Umpires:
Junko Wagatsuma (JPN)
Amy Baxter (USA)

8 April 2014
19:00 (NZST)

Argentina	3–2	New Zealand
Rebecchi 5', 66'; Aymar 40'	Report	Punt 44'; Whitelock 55'

Umpires:
Melissa Trivic (AUS)
Kang Hyun-Hee (KOR)

10 April 2014
15:00 (NZST)

Argentina	2–0	China
Rebecchi 23', 27'	Report

Umpires:
Melissa Trivic (AUS)
Amy Baxter (USA)

10 April 2014
17:00 (NZST)

Australia	5–3	South Korea
Smith 1'; Kenny 11'; Flanagan 43'; White 44'; Taylor 64'	Report	Park K. 10'; Park M. 67'; Han 70'

Umpires:
Michelle Joubert (RSA)
Karen Bennett (NZL)

10 April 2014
19:00 (NZST)

New Zealand	6–2	Japan
Flynn 4', 62'; Punt 21', 56'; Cocks 34'; Whitelock 51'	Report	Nakagawa 15'; Oikawa 57'

Umpires:
Miao Lin (CHN)
Mariana Reydo (ARG)

12 April 2014
11:30 (NZST)

China	0–1	South Korea
	Report	Kim D. 39'

Umpires:
Junko Wagatsuma (JPN)
Melissa Trivic (AUS)

12 April 2014
13:30 (NZST)

Japan	0–3	Argentina
	Report	Merino 9'; Rebecchi 31'; Cavallero 61'

Umpires:
Kang Hyun-Hee (KOR)
Karen Bennett (NZL)

12 April 2014
15:30 (NZST)

Australia	4–2	New Zealand
Nanscawen 11'; Peris 23'; Claxton 28'; Kenny 62'	Report	Fremaux 3'; Punt 33'

Umpires:
Mariana Reydo (ARG)
Miao Lin (CHN)

=== Classification round ===
==== Fifth and sixth place ====
13 April 2014
11:00 (NZST)

South Korea	2–1	Japan
Cheon S. 41'; Han 64'	Report	Shibata 32'

Umpires:
Maio Lin (CHN)
Karen Bennett (NZL)

==== Third and fourth place ====
13 April 2014
13:30 (NZST)

New Zealand	2–3	China
Webster 14'; Keddell 22'	Report	Liang 1'; Xi 28'; Huang 30'

Umpires:
Melissa Trivic (AUS)
Mariana Reydo (ARG)

==== Final ====
13 April 2014
16:00 (NZST)

Argentina	3–0	Australia
Sánchez Moccia 28'; Merino 41'; Rebecchi 51'	Report

Umpires:
Amy Baxter (USA)
Michelle Joubert (RSA)

== Statistics ==
=== Final standings ===
As per statistical convention in field hockey, matches decided in extra time are counted as wins and losses, while matches decided by penalty shoot-outs are counted as draws.

Pos	Team	Pld	W	D	L	GF	GA	GD	Pts	Status
1st place, gold medalist(s)	Argentina	6	6	0	0	19	3	+16	18	Gold Medal
2nd place, silver medalist(s)	Australia	6	4	0	2	14	11	+3	12	Silver Medal
3rd place, bronze medalist(s)	China	6	3	0	3	7	10	−3	9	Bronze Medal
4	New Zealand	6	2	0	4	16	15	+1	6	
5	South Korea	6	3	0	3	11	16	−5	9	
6	Japan	6	0	0	6	5	17	−12	0	

Source: FIH

=== Goalscorers ===
There were 72 goals scored in 18 matches, for an average of 4 goals per match.

9 goals

- (Argentina) Carla Rebecchi

6 goals

- (New Zealand) Anita Punt

4 goals

- (Argentina) Delfina Merino
- (South Korea) Han Hye-Lyoung

3 goals

- (Australia) Kellie White

2 goals

- (Argentina) Luciana Aymar
- (Australia) Jodie Kenny
- (Australia) Georgia Nanscawen
- (Australia) Emily Smith
- (China) Wang Mengyu
- (New Zealand) Gemma Flynn
- (New Zealand) Petrea Webster
- (New Zealand) Kayla Whitelock
- (South Korea) Kim Da-Rae
- (South Korea) Cheon Seul-Ki

1 goal

- (Argentina) Martina Cavallero
- (Argentina) Giselle Juárez
- (Argentina) Rosario Luchetti
- (Argentina) Rocío Sánchez Moccia
- (Australia) Mathilda Carmichael
- (Australia) Jane Claxton
- (Australia) Anna Flanagan
- (Australia) Brooke Peris
- (Australia) Jayde Taylor
- (China) Liang Meiyu
- (China) Huang Ting
- (China) Zhang Xiaoxue
- (China) Xi Xiayun
- (China) Peng Yang
- (Japan) Miyuki Nakagawa
- (Japan) Shihori Oikawa
- (Japan) Mayumi Ono
- (Japan) Akiko Ota
- (Japan) Akane Shibata
- (New Zealand) Sophie Cocks
- (New Zealand) Sian Fremaux
- (New Zealand) Rose Keddell
- (New Zealand) Olivia Merry
- (South Korea) An Hyo-Ju
- (South Korea) Park Ki-Ju
- (South Korea) Park Mi-Hyun

Source: FIH
