= 2011 Women's Four Nations Hockey Tournament (Rosario) =

Four Nations
Tournament details
- Host country: Argentina
- City: Rosario
- Teams: 4 (from 3 confederations)
- Venue: Estadio Mundialista de Hockey

Final positions
- Champions: Argentina (1st title)
- Runner-up: United States
- Third place: Australia

Tournament statistics
- Matches played: 8
- Goals scored: 30 (3.75 per match)
- Top scorer: (Argentina) Noel Barrionuevo (4 goals)
- Best player: (Germany) Christina Schütze

The 2011 Women's Four Nations Hockey Tournament was the second of two women's field hockey tournaments, consisting of a series of test matches. It was held in Mendoza, Argentina, from February 16 to 20, 2011, and featured four of the top nations in women's field hockey.

== Competition format ==
The tournament featured the national teams of Australia, Germany, the United States, and the hosts, Argentina, competing in a round-robin format, with each team playing each other once. Three points will be awarded for a win, one for a draw, and none for a loss.

Country	December 2010 FIH Ranking	Best World Cup finish	Best Olympic Games finish
Argentina	1	Champions (2002, 2010)	Runners-Up (2000)
Australia	7	Champions (1994, 1998)	Champions (1988, 1996, 2000)
Germany	3	Champions (1976, 1981)	Champions (2004)
United States	11	Third place (1994)	Third place (1984)

== Officials ==
The following umpires were appointed by the International Hockey Federation to officiate the tournament:

- Amy Hassick (USA)
- Catalina Montesino Wenzel (CHL)
- Irene Presenqui (ARG)
- Gaby Schmitz (GER)
- Kylie Seymour (AUS)

== Results ==
All times are local (Argentina Standard Time).

=== Preliminary round ===
Pos	Team	Pld	W	D	L	GF	GA	GD	Pts	Qualification
1	Argentina (H)	3	2	1	0	8	4	+4	7	Advanced to Final
2	United States	3	2	0	1	7	5	+2	6	Advanced to Final
3	Germany	3	1	0	2	4	7	−3	3	
4	Australia	3	0	1	2	3	6	−3	1	

Source: Deutscher Hockey-Bund
Rules for classification: 1) points; 2) goal difference; 3) goals scored; 4) head-to-head result.
(H) Hosts

==== Fixtures ====
16 February 2011
18:00

Germany	0–3	United States
	Report	Albini 14', 27'; Evans 41'

Umpires:
Catalina Montesino Wenzel (CHL)
Irene Presenqui (ARG)

16 February 2011
20:30

Argentina	1–1	Australia
D. Sruoga 51'	Report	Olivieri 55'

Umpires:
Amy Hassick (USA)
Gaby Schmitz (GER)

17 February 2011
18:00

Australia	1–2	Germany
Nelson 35'	Report	Hoffmann 22', 58'

Umpires:
Amy Hassick (USA)
Irene Presenqui (ARG)

17 February 2011
20:30

Argentina	4–1	United States
D. Sruoga 7'; D'Elía 11', 27'; Barrionuevo 64'	Report	Selenski 65'

Umpires:
Kylie Seymour (AUS)
Catalina Montesino Wenzel (CHL)

19 February 2011
18:00

Australia	1–3	United States
Nelson 61'	Report	Laubach 18', 46'; Selenski 68'

Umpires:
Gaby Schmitz (GER)
Irene Presenqui (ARG)

19 February 2011
20:30

Germany	2–3	Argentina
Krüger 60'; Hauke 67'	Report	Barrionuevo 20'; Luchetti 51'; Maccari 54'

Umpires:
Catalina Montesino Wenzel (CHL)
Kylie Seymour (AUS)

=== Classification round ===
==== Third and fourth place ====
20 February 2011
17:30

Germany	1–2	Australia
Pütz 21'	Report	Schulz 51'; Nelson 61'

Umpires:
Amy Hassick (USA)
Catalina Montesino Wenzel (CHL)

==== Final ====
20 February 2011
20:30

Argentina	3–2	United States
Barrionuevo 16', 30'; Rebecchi 63'	Report	Laubach 7'; Selenski 67'

Umpires:
Gaby Schmitz (GER)
Kylie Seymour (AUS)

== Awards ==
The following awards were presented at the conclusion of the tournament:

Player of the Tournament	Top Goalscorer	Goalkeeper of the Tournament
(Germany) Christina Schütze	(Argentina) Noel Barrionuevo	(Australia) Toni Cronk

== Statistics ==
=== Final standings ===
Pos	Team	Pld	W	D	L	GF	GA	GD	Pts	Status
1st place, gold medalist(s)	Argentina (H)	4	3	1	0	11	6	+5	10	Tournament Champion
2nd place, silver medalist(s)	United States	4	2	0	2	9	8	+1	6	
3rd place, bronze medalist(s)	Australia	4	1	1	2	5	7	−2	4	
4	Germany	4	1	0	3	5	9	−4	3	

Source: Deutscher Hockey-Bund
(H) Hosts

=== Goalscorers ===
There were 30 goals scored in 8 matches, for an average of 3.75 goals per match.

4 goals

- (Argentina) Noel Barrionuevo

3 goals

- (Australia) Ashleigh Nelson
- (United States) Claire Laubach
- (United States) Paige Selenski

2 goals

- (Argentina) Silvina D'Elía
- (Argentina) Daniela Sruoga
- (Germany) Eileen Hoffmann
- (United States) Torrie Albini

1 goal

- (Argentina) Rosario Luchetti
- (Argentina) Sofía Maccari
- (Argentina) Carla Rebecchi
- (Australia) Kandice Olivieri
- (Australia) Jodie Schulz
- (Germany) Franzisca Hauke
- (Germany) Hannah Krüger
- (Germany) Jennifer Pütz
- (United States) Katie Evans
