= Hawke's Bay Cup =

Field hockey tournament in New Zealand

- Sport: Field hockey
- Founded: 2014
- Folded: 2017
- No. of teams: 8
- Continent: Oceania (New Zealand)
- Last champion: New Zealand (2nd title)
- Most titles: New Zealand (2 titles)
- Website: hockeyfestival.nz

The Hawke's Bay Cup was an international women's field hockey tournament, held annually in the New Zealand city of Hastings.

Founded in 2014, the Hawke's Bay Cup is an initiative backed by the Hawke's Bay Region tourist industry and many local businesses. The tournament plays a major role in the annual Hawke's Bay Festival of Hockey, which showcases the top talent from around New Zealand.

Of the four tournaments held so far, three teams have lifted the title. New Zealand are the most successful team, having won the title twice. Australia and Argentina are joint second best team, each having won the title once, with Argentina taking home the trophy in the tournament's inaugural year.

The size of the tournament has changed throughout its four years, with 6 teams participating in the 2014 tournament, 8 teams participating in the 2015 and 2016 tournaments, and 4 teams taking part in the 2017 tournament.

New Zealand won the 2017 tournament, taking on teams from Japan, Australia and the United States.

== Teams ==
2017 Tournament Teams

- Australia
- Japan
- New Zealand
- United States

Past Tournament Teams

- Argentina
- Canada
- China
- India
- Ireland
- South Korea

== Results ==
=== Summaries ===
Year	Host	Final			Third place match
Year	Host	Winner	Score	Runner-up	Third place	Score	Fourth place
2014; Details	Hastings, New Zealand	Argentina	3–0	Australia	China	3–2	New Zealand
2015; Details	Hastings, New Zealand	Australia	3–2	New Zealand	China	3–2	South Korea
2016; Details	Hastings, New Zealand	New Zealand	3–2	Japan	Australia	3–1	China
2017; Details	Hastings, New Zealand	New Zealand	3–0	Japan	Australia	1–1 (3–1); Penalties	United States

=== Successful national teams ===
Team	Titles	Runners-up	Third places	Fourth places
New Zealand	2 (2016, 2017)	1 (2015)		1 (2014)
Australia	1 (2015)	1 (2014)	2 (2016, 2017)	
Argentina	1 (2014)			
Japan		2 (2016, 2017)		
China			2 (2014, 2015)	1 (2016)
South Korea				1 (2015)
United States				1 (2017)

=== Team Performances ===
Team	2014	2015	2016	2017	Total
Australia	2nd	1st	3rd	3rd	4
Argentina	1st	6th	–	–	2
Canada	–	–	8th	–	1
China	3rd	3rd	4th	–	3
India	–	7th	6th	–	2
Ireland	–	–	5th	–	1
Japan	6th	8th	2nd	2nd	4
New Zealand	4th	2nd	1st	1st	4
South Korea	5th	4th	7th	–	3
United States	–	5th	–	4th	2
Total	6	8	8	4	26
