= Grant Boyce =

Australian field hockey player

Personal information
- Nationality: Australian
- Born: 30 May 1956 (age 69)

Sport
- Sport: Field hockey

Grant Boyce (born 30 May 1956) is an Australian field hockey player. He competed at the 1984 Summer Olympics in Los Angeles, where the Australian team placed fourth.

His niece Fiona Boyce is also an international field hockey player.
