= 2013 Men's International Super Series Hockey 9's =

Tournament details
- Host country: Australia
- City: Perth, Western Australia
- Dates: 17–20 October 2013
- Teams: 4 (from 3 confederations)
- Venue: Perth Hockey Stadium

Final positions
- Champions: Australia (3rd title)
- Runner-up: Argentina
- Third place: Malaysia

Tournament statistics
- Matches played: 8
- Goals scored: 55 (6.88 per match)
- Top scorer: (Australia) Russell Ford (6 goals)
- Best player: (Australia) Russell Ford

The 2013 Men's International Super Series Hockey 9's was the third and final edition of the men's field hockey tournament. The tournament was held at the Perth Hockey Stadium between 17–20 October 2013 in Perth, Western Australia. A total of four teams competed for the title.

The tournament was held alongside the women's competition.

Australia won the tournament by defeating Argentina 9–4 in the final. Malaysia won the bronze medal by defeating Pakistan 2–1 in the third and fourth playoff.

== Participating nations ==
A total of four teams competed for the title:

- Argentina
- Australia
- Malaysia
- Pakistan

== Officials ==
The following umpires were appointed by the FIH and Hockey Australia to officiate the tournament:

- Murray Grime (AUS)
- Devendra Patel (NZL)
- Rohizan Ramli (MAS)
- Maximiliano Scala (ARG)
- Kamran Sharif (PAK)

== Competition format and rules ==
The International Super Series Hockey 9's has a unique set of rules varying from standard FIH regulations.

The main variations are as follows:

- Matches are played with a maximum of 9 players on the field at any time for each team
- Matches are played in 2 halves of 20 minutes
- Goals are widened by 1 metre than regulation size

== Results ==
=== Preliminary round ===
Pos	Team	Pld	W	D	L	GF	GA	GD	Pts	Qualification
1	Australia (H)	3	2	1	0	14	4	+10	7	Advanced to Final
2	Argentina	3	1	2	0	12	9	+3	5	Advanced to Final
3	Pakistan	3	1	1	1	10	10	0	4	
4	Malaysia	3	0	0	3	3	16	−13	0	

Source: Hockey Australia
Rules for classification: 1) points; 2) goal difference; 3) goals scored; 4) head-to-head result.
(H) Hosts

==== Fixtures ====
17 October 2013
19:20

Australia	4–4	Argentina
Ockenden 2'; Orchard 5'; Beale 6'; Ford 7'	Report	Mazzilli 12'; Schickendantz 14'; Paredes 20'; 21'

Umpires:
Devendra Patel (NZL)
Rohizan Ramli (MAS)

17 October 2013
20:15

Pakistan	5–3	Malaysia
Qadir 6'; Bhutta 16'; Hussain 23'; Dilber 35', 39'	Report	Nabil 1'; Shahrun 25'; Azlan 36'

Umpires:
Murray Grime (AUS)
Maximiliano Scala (ARG)

18 October 2013
18:25

Malaysia	0–8	Australia
	Report	Dwyer 6', 19', 34'; De Young 14'; Zalewski 18'; Ford 20', 40'; Orchard 30'

Umpires:
Kamran Sharif (PAK)
Devendra Patel (NZL)

18 October 2013
20:15

Argentina	5–5	Pakistan
Rossi 23'; Rey 28'; Mazzilli 33'; Paredes 38'; Barreiros 39'	Report	Dilber 2', 20', 40'; Rizwan 19'; Rasool 21'

Umpires:
Rohizan Ramli (MAS)
Murray Grime (AUS)

19 October 2013
14:05

Australia	2–0	Pakistan
Ford 4'; Turner 5'	Report

Umpires:
Maximiliano Scala (ARG)
Devendra Patel (NZL)

19 October 2013
15:00

Argentina	3–0	Malaysia
Rey 8'; Ibarra 13'; Schickendantz 30'	Report

Umpires:
Murray Grime (AUS)
Kamran Sharif (PAK)

=== Classification round ===
==== Third and fourth place ====
20 October 2013
10:30

Pakistan	1–2	Malaysia
Qadir 29'	Report	Azlan 17'; Izwan 26'

Umpires:
Devendra Patel (NZL)
Kamran Sharif (PAK)

==== Final ====
20 October 2013
14:00

Australia	9–4	Argentina
Dwyer 5'; De Young 9', 40'; Turner 11', 32'; Ford 15', 20'; Simpson 37'; Beale 39'	Report	Callioni 13'; Mazzilli 20'; Paredes 33'; Schickendantz 40'

Umpires:
Maximiliano Scala (ARG)
Murray Grime (AUS)

== Statistics ==
=== Final standings ===
Pos	Team	Pld	W	D	L	GF	GA	GD	Pts	Final standings
1st place, gold medalist(s)	Australia (H)	4	3	1	0	23	8	+15	10	Gold Medal
2nd place, silver medalist(s)	Argentina	4	1	2	1	16	18	−2	5	Silver Medal
3rd place, bronze medalist(s)	Malaysia	4	1	0	3	5	17	−12	3	Bronze Medal
4	Pakistan	4	1	1	2	11	12	−1	4	

Source: Hockey Australia
(H) Hosts

=== Goalscorers ===
There were 55 goals scored in 8 matches, for an average of 6.88 goals per match.

6 goals

- (Australia) Russell Ford

5 goals

- (Pakistan) Muhammad Dilber

4 goals

- (Australia) Jamie Dwyer

3 goals

- (Argentina) Agustín Mazzilli
- (Argentina) Matías Paredes
- (Argentina) Guillermo Schickendantz
- (Australia) Glenn Turner
- (Australia) Liam de Young

2 goals

- (Argentina) Lucas Rey
- (Australia) Daniel Beale
- (Australia) Simon Orchard
- (Malaysia) Azlan Misron
- (Pakistan) Arslan Qadir

1 goal

- (Argentina) Guido Barreiros
- (Argentina) Facundo Callioni
- (Argentina) Pedro Ibarra
- (Argentina) Lucas Rossi
- (Australia) Edward Ockenden
- (Australia) Glenn Simpson
- (Australia) Aran Zalewski
- (Malaysia) Nabil Fiqri
- (Malaysia) Shahrun Nabil
- (Malaysia) Izwan Ahmad Tajuddin
- (Pakistan) Muhammad Umar Bhutta
- (Pakistan) Salman Hussain
- (Pakistan) Shafqat Rasool
- (Pakistan) Muhammad Rizwan Jr.

1 own goal

- Australia (against Argentina)
