= Anupama Puchimanda =

Indian field hockey umpire and player (1980–2021)

Anupama Puchimanda (8 July 1980 – 18 April 2021) was an Indian athlete who competed nationally in field hockey and officiated internationally as an umpire. In 2006, she was the first Indian woman to umpire at the Commonwealth Games. She officiated over 90 international hockey matches, including the Asian Games, Central American and Caribbean Games, the FIH Junior World Cup, and the East Asian Games, as well as over 100 Indian hockey matches during her career.

== Biography ==
Puchimanda was born in Virajpet, Karnataka and earned a degree in law. In April 2021, Puchimanda contracted and died of COVID-19 at the age of 41. She was married to Mithun Mandanna.

== Career ==
Puchimanda began her hockey career in 1995, competing in a sub-junior National championship and representing the State of Karnataka. She later represented the senior team at the same championship, played for Mangalore University's hockey team, and became a hockey umpire for the State of Karnataka in 2004. She played in the mid-field and right flank.

She was involved in the development of hockey as a sport in the state of Karnataka, and served as an executive member of the Karnataka State Hockey Association. In 2004, Puchimanda was selected by the erstwhile Indian Hockey Federation to act as an umpire for women's hockey matches.

In 2006, Puchimanda became the first woman from India to officiate at the Commonwealth Games, acting as an umpire for women's hockey. She later officiated at the 2006 Central American and Caribbean Games as well as the Asian Games, FIH junior World Cup and East Asian Games. She also officiated at the BDO Junior World Cup (Women) (2005,Santiago), the Hero Hockey World League Round-2 (Women) (2013, Delhi) and the 2013 Women's Asia Cup (Kuala Lumpur). In 2012, she officiated at the Women's Four Nations Hockey Tournament. During her career, she officiated over 90 international hockey matches, as well as an equivalent amount of national and state matches in India.

== Awards and honours ==
In 2011, she was one of several people who received a Namma Bengaluru Award from the city of Bengaluru for her achievements in sports.
