= Roos Drost =

Dutch field hockey player

Personal information
- Born: May 2, 1991 (age 35) Utrecht, Netherlands
- Height: 1.7 m (5 ft 7 in)

Sport
- Sport: Field hockey
- Position: Midfield
Senior career
Years	Team	Caps	Goals
2009–2012	HC Kampong	-	-
2012–present	SCHC	-	-
National team
Years	Team	Caps	Goals
2013–present	Netherlands		-
Medal record
Women's field hockey
Representing the Netherlands
Women's Hockey World Cup
Gold medal – first place	2014 The Hague	team
FIH Hockey World League
Gold medal – first place	2013	team
Women's Hockey Investec Cup
Gold medal – first place	2013 Cape Town	team
Hockey Champions Trophy
Bronze medal – third place	2014 Mendoza	team
Women's EuroHockey Nations Championship
Bronze medal – third place	2013 Boom	team

Rosalin "Roos" Drost also known as Rosalin Drost (born 2 May 1991) is a Dutch women's field hockey player who plays for Netherlands women's national field hockey team. Drost made her international debut on 4 February 2013 against South Africa similar to fellow player Malou Pheninckx. She was a key member of the Dutch team which became glorious at the 2012–13 Women's FIH Hockey World League, 2013 Women's Hockey Investec Cup and in the 2014 Women's Hockey World Cup.

== Career ==
She played the key role during the Dutch side's maiden triumph in the 2012–13 Women's FIH Hockey World League defeating Australia 5–1 in the Women's Hockey World League final. She also scored a goal in the final as Netherlands clinched its first ever FIH Hockey World League title.

Rosalin Drost was also the member of the Netherlands women's team which won the 2013 Women's Hockey Investec Cup. Netherlands defeated South Africa 4–2 in the final to clinch second consecutive Women's Hockey Investec Cup. She also scored a winning goal in the final against South Africa and finished as the second top goalscorer for Dutch side with 2 goals.

Roos Drost was also the part of the Dutch team which secured its 7th World Cup title after emerging victorious at the 2014 Women's Hockey World Cup.
