= Kellie White =

Australian field hockey player (born 1991)

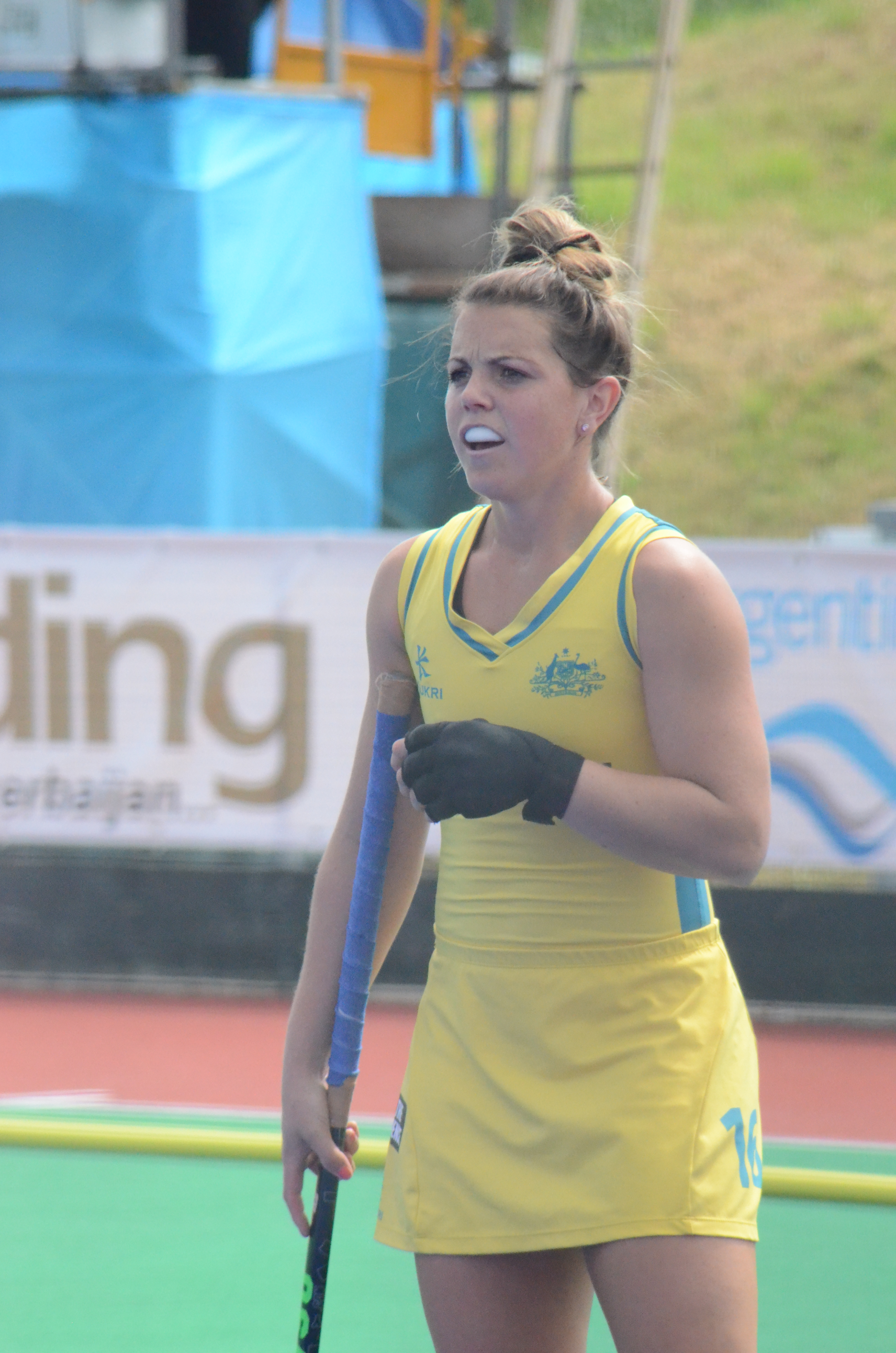

Personal information
- Full name: Kellie White
- Born: 15 July 1991 (age 35) Crookwell, New South Wales

Sport
- Sport: Field hockey
- Position: Forward
- Club: New South Wales Arrows
National team
Years	Team	Caps	Goals
2011–	Australia	97	(31)
Medal record
Women's field hockey
Representing Australia
World Cup
Silver medal – second place	2014 The Hague	Team
Commonwealth Games
Gold medal – first place	2014 Glasgow	Team
World League
Silver medal – second place	2012-13 Tucuman	Team
Oceania Cup
Gold medal – first place	2013 Stratford	Team
Silver medal – second place	2011 Hobart	Team

Kellie White (born 15 July 1991 in Crookwell, New South Wales) is an Australian field hockey player. White was a member of the Australia women's national field hockey team that were defeated by the Netherlands women's national field hockey team in the final of the 2014 Women's Hockey World Cup. She was also part of the squad's success in the 2014 Commonwealth Games in Glasgow after they beat England 3–1 on penalty shootouts in the final. As of December 2016, she has 97 caps and 31 goals to her name. Her former club was Laggan Lilacs, Crookwell, NSW. She plays as a forward.
