= Susie Gilbert =

English field hockey player

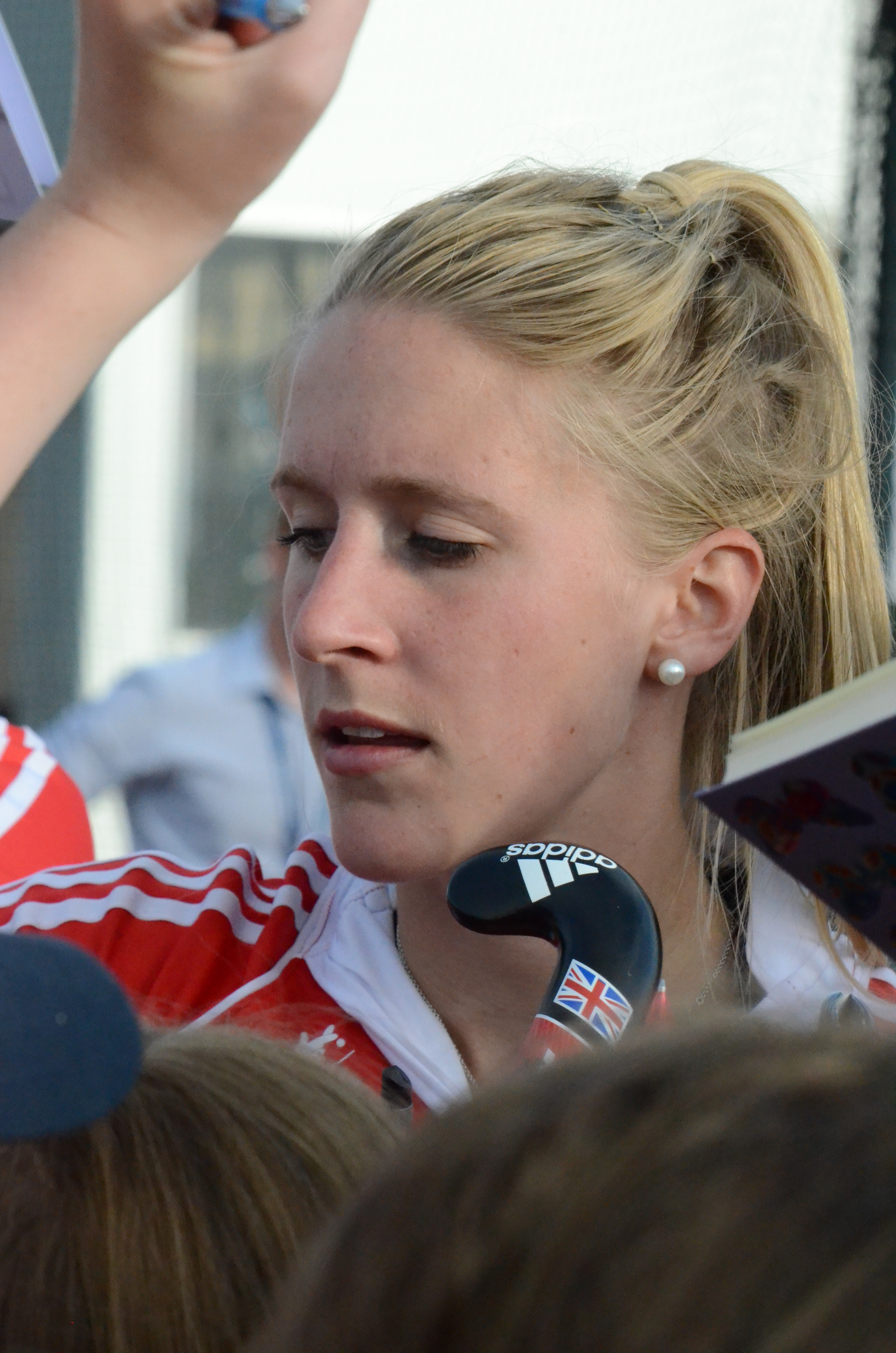
- Susie Gilbert in 2013

Personal information
- Full name: Susannah Gilbert
- Born: 21 February 1989 (age 37) Burton on Trent, England
- Height: 1.67 m (5 ft 6 in)
- Weight: 59 kg (130 lb)

Sport
- Sport: Field hockey
- Position: Midfield
- Club: Surbiton
Senior career
Years	Team	Caps	Goals
–	Cannock	-	-
2010–2012	Uni of Birmingham	-	-
2012–2017	Reading	-	-
2017–2018	Rotterdam	-	-
2018–	Surbiton	-	-
National team
Years	Team	Caps	Goals
2007–2015	England & GB	159	(15)
Medal record
Representing England
European Championship
Gold medal – first place	2015 London	Team
Commonwealth Games
Silver medal – second place	2014 Glasgow	Team
Bronze medal – third place	2010 Delhi	Team
- Updated on 31 July 2018

Susannah "Susie" Gilbert (born 21 February 1989) is an English international field hockey player who played as a midfielder for England and Great Britain.

She plays club hockey in the Investec Women's Hockey League Premier Division for Surbiton.

She competed for England in the women's hockey tournament at the 2014 Commonwealth Games where she won a silver medal. She was educated at Repton School and graduated from Birmingham University in Geography in 2012.
