= Emily Chalker =

Australian field hockey player

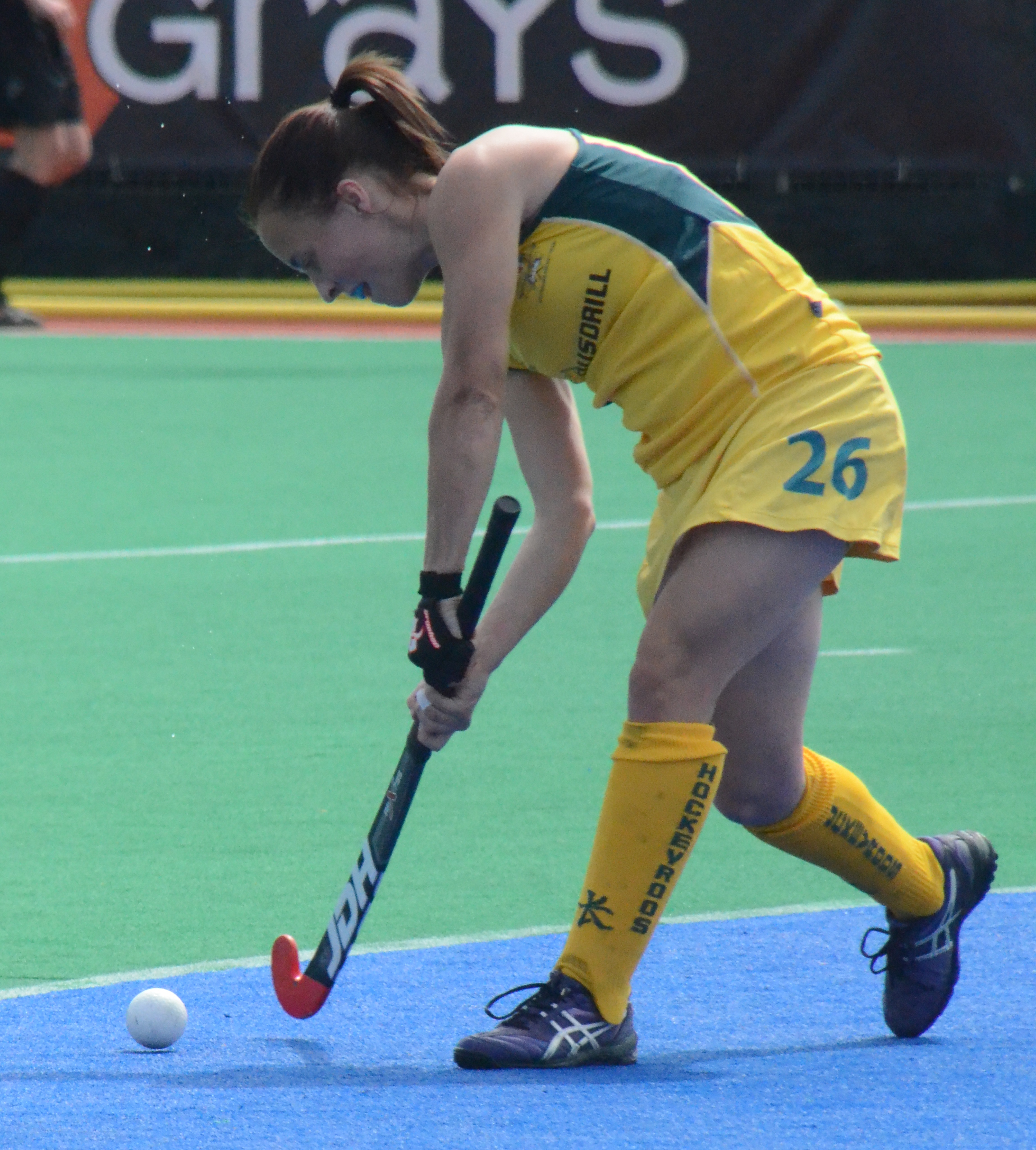
- Chalker in 2013

Personal information
- Born: Emily Smith; 28 July 1992 (age 34) Crookwell, New South Wales
- Height: 1.59 m (5 ft 3 in)
- Weight: 57 kg (126 lb)

Sport
- Sport: Field hockey
- Position: Attacker
- Club: NSW Arrows
National team
Years	Team	Caps	Goals
2011–	Australia	230	(80)
Medal record
World Cup
Silver medal – second place	2014 The Hague
FIH Pro League
Silver medal – second place	2019 Amstelveen
Champions Trophy
Silver medal – second place	2014 Mendoza
Silver medal – second place	2018 Changzhou
Oceania Cup
Gold medal – first place	2017 Sydney
Silver medal – second place	2019 Rockhampton
Commonwealth Games
Gold medal – first place	2014 Glasgow	Team
Silver medal – second place	2018 Gold Coast	Team

Emily Chalker (née Smith; born 28 July 1992) is an Australian field hockey player. She has been selected to represent Australia in field hockey at the 2012, 2016 and 2020 Summer Olympics along with other competitions.

== Personal ==
Chalker was born on 28 July 1992 in Crookwell, New South Wales and is from Southern Tablelands region of New South Wales. She attended St Mary's Primary School in New South Wales before going on to Crookwell High School. She has deferred admissions to the University of New South Wales where she will major in Exercise Physiology. She moved to Sydney in 2011 before moving to Perth, Western Australia where she now lives.

Chalker is 159 centimetres (63 in) tall and weighs 57 kilograms (126 lb).

== Field hockey ==
Chalker played junior hockey in Crookwell. She has held a field hockey scholarship at the New South Wales Institute of Sport (NSWIS) and the Australian Institute of Sport (AIS). She plays for the NSW Arrows in the Australian Hockey League, where she wears shirt number 3. She has played club field hockey for the Crookwell Golf Club, ANU, and the Park Panthers.

=== National team ===
When Adam Commens became the Hockeyroos' new coach in January 2011, Chalker was one of four players identified to develop the national side. She made her Australian debut in 2011, in a match against New Zealand in Hobart, Tasmania. In June 2012, she played in the Investec London Cup. She played in Australia's 1–4 loss to the Netherlands, scoring her team's only goal. In the 4–1 win against Ireland in the lead up London, she scored the team's second goal. Her goal was the second of the tournament. As of June 2012, she had 22 caps with the Hockeyroos, and 7 international goals.

Chalker was named to the Australia women's national field hockey squad that competed at the 2012 Summer Olympics. As a teenager, she was the youngest member of the team.

Chalker qualified for the Tokyo 2020 Olympics. She was part of the Hockeyroos Olympics squad. The Hockeyroos lost 1-0 to India in the quarterfinals and therefore were not in medal contention.
