= Shannon Taylor (field hockey) =

American field hockey player (born 1986)

Medal record

Women's field hockey

Representing United States

Pan American Games
Gold medal – first place	2011 Guadalajara	Team

Shannon Taylor (born December 25, 1986) is an American field hockey player. At the 2012 Summer Olympics, she competed for the United States women's national field hockey team in the women's event. She was born in Milford, Delaware. Taylor attended Syracuse University, where she played on the school's field hockey team.

She currently serves as an assistant coach at Saint Joseph's, having previously been an assistant at UMass for three seasons.
