= Claire Laubach =

American field hockey player (born 1983)

Medal record

Women's field hockey

Representing United States

Pan American Games
Gold medal – first place	2011 Guadalajara	Team

Claire Laubach (born July 29) is an American field hockey player. At the 2012 Summer Olympics, she competed for the United States women's national field hockey team in the women's event. She was born in Washington Township, New Jersey.
