= Eileen Hoffmann =

German field hockey player

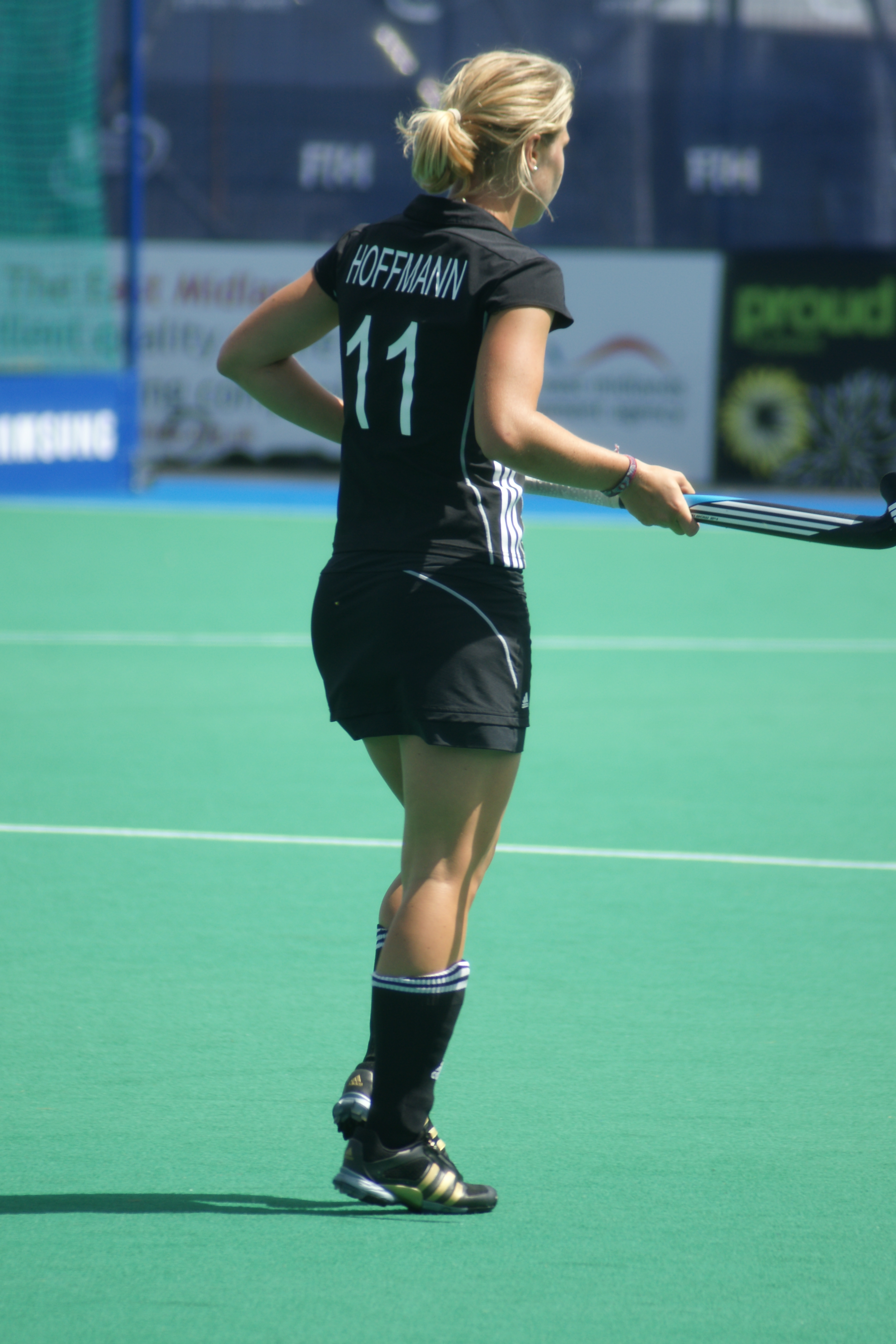
- Hoffmann in 2010

Personal information
- Born: 25 June 1984 (age 41); Berlin
- Height: 168 cm (5 ft 6 in)
- Weight: 58 kg (128 lb)

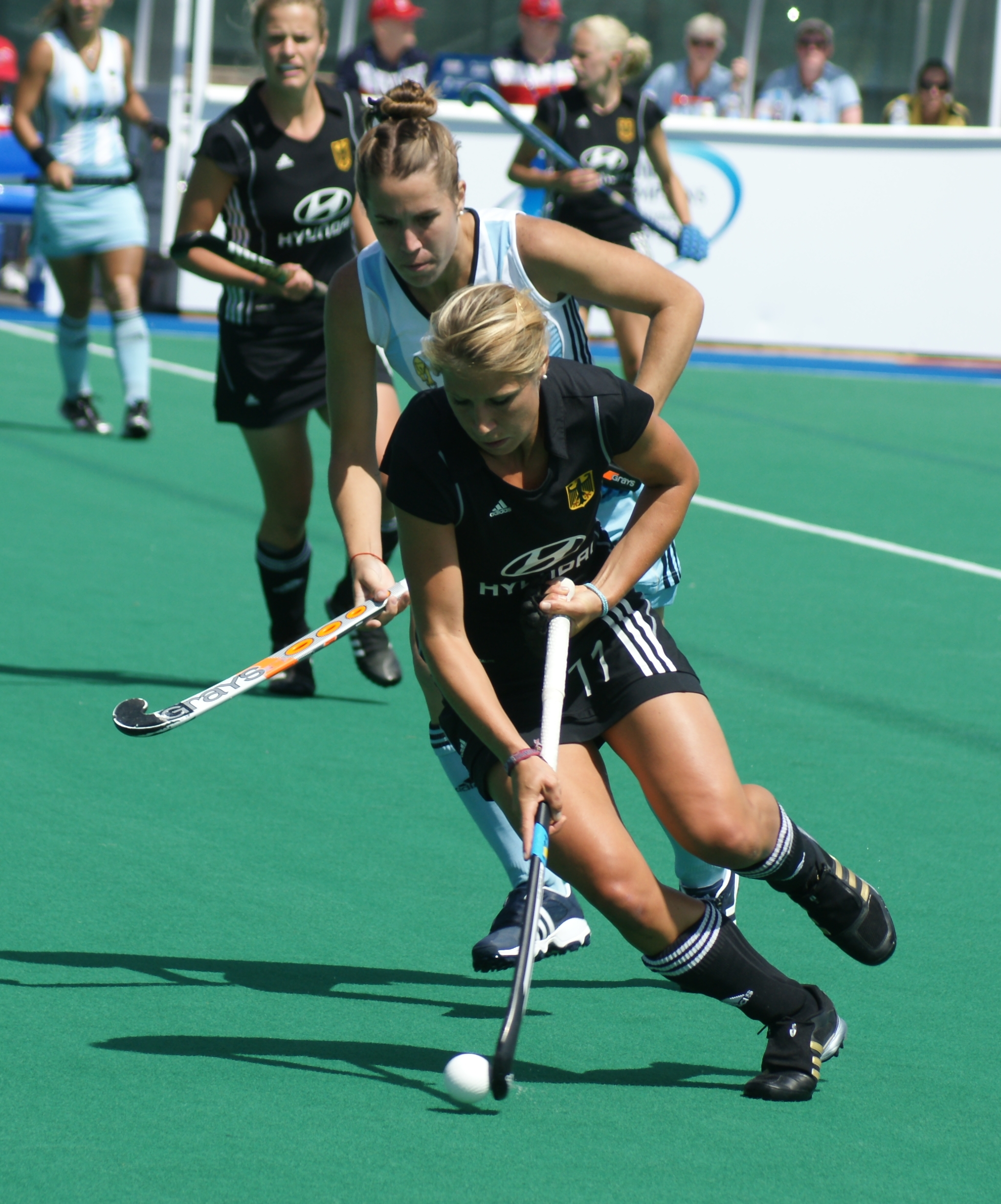

Eileen Mävers (née Hoffmann, born 25 June 1984) is a German field hockey player who competed in the 2008 Summer Olympics.
