= Jade Close =

Australian field hockey player

Personal information
- Nickname: Ruby
- Nationality: Australian
- Born: 18 October 1987 (age 39) Wagga Wagga, New South Wales

Sport
- Sport: Field hockey
- Event: Women's team
- Team: Retired

Achievements and titles
- Olympic finals: 2012
- Updated on 25 June 2012

Jade Close (born 18 October 1987) is an Australian field hockey player. She plays club hockey for the NSW Arrows in the Australian Hockey League. She is a member of the Hockeyroos and has had 87 caps for the team. She was selected to represent Australia at the 2012 Summer Olympics.

== Personal ==
Close, nicknamed Ruby, was born on 18 October 1987 in Wagga Wagga. She is from Penrith, New South Wales. She lives in Perth, Western Australia because the national team trains there. When not training with them, she stays at home with family in Penrith. She was a ball girl at the 2000 Summer Olympics during the Hockeyroos' gold medal match.

Close is currently the Assistant Pathways Manager for Hockey NSW.

== Field hockey ==
Close is a striker, who started playing the sport because her sister's team needed an extra player. She plays for the NSW Arrows in the Australian Hockey League, wearing jersey number 4. Her hockey sponsors include Mazon (Just Hockey) and Lawrence & Hanson.

=== National team ===
Close made her national team debut at the European Tour 2010. When the Hockeyroos got new coach Adam Commens in January 2011, she was one of four players identified to aid in developing the national side. As of 21 June 2012, she had 87 caps with the Australia women's national field hockey team.

In June 2012, Close played in the Investec London Cup. She played in Australia's 1–4 loss to the Netherlands.

Close was named to the Australia women's national field hockey squad that will compete at the 2012 Summer Olympics, making her debut as a twenty-four-year-old. In preparation for the Games, she participated in a four-week Perth-based training camp in June and July 2012. She and her team-mates were scheduled to leave for the London Games on 17 July.
