= Anna Flanagan =

Australian field hockey player

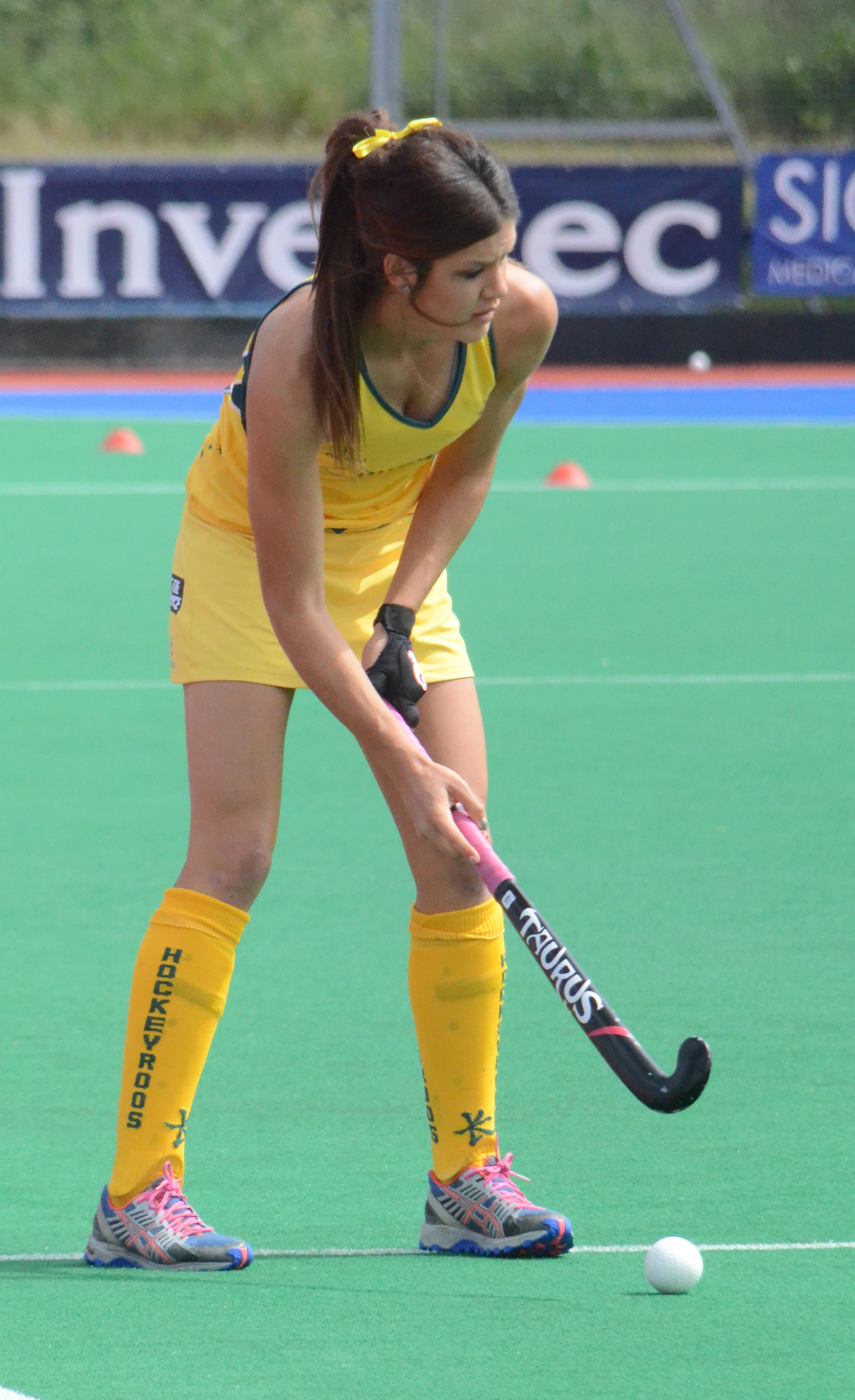
- Flanagan with the Hockeyroos in 2013

Personal information
- Full name: Anna Flanagan
- Born: 8 January 1992 (age 34) Canberra, Australian Capital Territory
- Height: 1.80 m (5 ft 11 in)

Sport
- Sport: Field hockey
- Position: Defender
- Club: Canberra Labor Club Strikers
National team
Years	Team	Caps	Goals
2010–2016	Australia	171	(34)
Medal record
Women's field hockey
Representing Australia
Commonwealth Games
Gold medal – first place	2010 New Delhi	Team
Gold medal – first place	2014 Glasgow	Team
World Cup
Silver medal – second place	2014 The Hague	Team
Champions Trophy
Silver medal – second place	2014 Mendoza	Team

Anna Flanagan (born 8 January 1992) is an Australian field hockey player who plays as a defender for the Canberra Labor Club Strikers in the Australian Hockey League. She is nicknamed Flanno.

A full international with over 100 caps since 2010 for the Australian national team, she has represented the nation at one World Cup and in one Olympic Games tournaments.

== Career ==
Flanagan is a defender, who specialises in taking corner penalties. In 2000, after being a multi-sport athlete, she made a commitment to playing field hockey.

Flanagan made her national team debut in March 2010 in a friendly against South Korea as an 18-year-old, after having been first called up to the team when she was 17 years old. Her selection to the squad came during a period when the team was injecting a lot of youth players following the 2008 Summer Olympics. Later in 2010, she would represent Australia as a member of the gold medal-winning team at the Commonwealth Games. As a member of the 2012 Australian team at the 2012 Summer Olympics, she had a fifth-place finish. Going into the Games, she had over 50 caps for the national team.

Flanagan was named in 2013 the World Young Player of the Year in field hockey. She took part in the 2012–13 Women's FIH Hockey World League, which took place in Tucumán, Argentina. Her team reached the second place and she scored the only Australian goal in the final game.

== Personal life ==
Flanagan was born on 8 January 1992. Her father is Fred Flanagan, a PE teacher in Canberra. She grew up in Canberra where she played tennis, track and field and field hockey. She attended Brindabella Christian College before going to Radford College. She earned a degree in sports journalism from the University of Canberra. Her professional career in journalism started around the time that she was added to the Australian field hockey squad. She moved from Canberra to Perth following the Commonwealth Games in order to further her field hockey career. Following this move, she started doing some professional journalism work for Fox Sports in Perth. In 2011 and 2012, she was enrolled at Curtin University.

== In popular culture ==
Flanagan is currently sponsored by Australian hockey brand Ritual Hockey. She is also sponsored by Nike, and in early 2015, Flanagan became the first Australian hockey player to sign a sponsorship deal with global brand Red Bull.

== Awards ==
Individual

- World Young Player of the Year: 2013
