= Fiona Boyce =

Australian field hockey player

Fiona Boyce (born 11 June 1987, Perth) is an Australian field hockey player. Her uncle, Grant Boyce, was also an Olympic hockey player.
