= Casey Sablowski =

Australian women's field hockey player

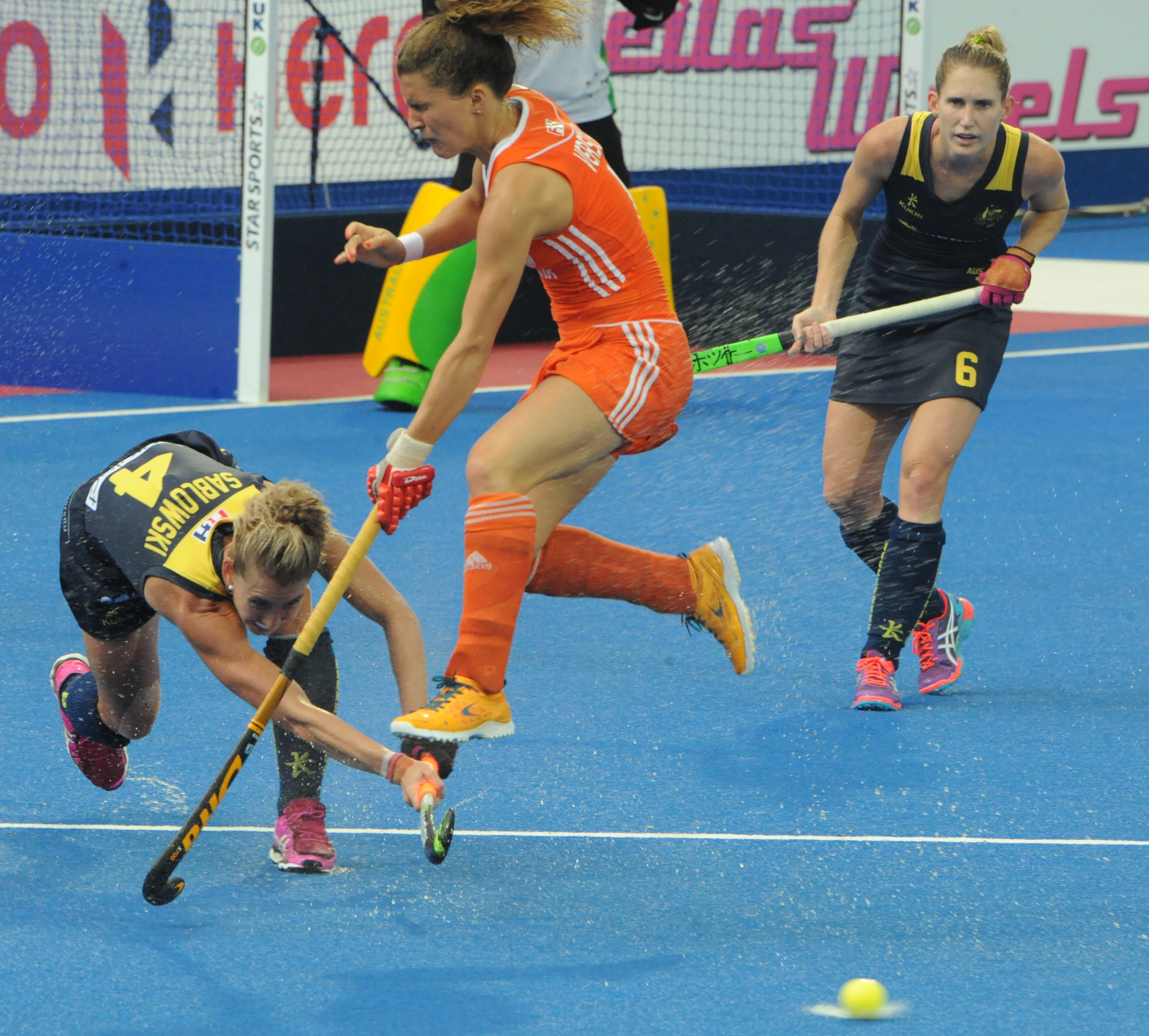
- Casey Sablowski (left)

Personal information
- Born: 19 March 1989 (age 37) Shellharbour, New South Wales, Australia
Medal record
Women's field hockey
Representing Australia
World Cup
Silver medal – second place	2014 The Hague	Team
Commonwealth Games
Gold medal – first place	2010 Delhi	Team
Gold medal – first place	2014 Glasgow	Team
Champions Trophy
Silver medal – second place	2009 Sydney	Team
Silver medal – second place	2014 Mendoza	Team

Casey Sablowski (née Eastham; born 19 March 1989, in Shellharbour) is an Australian women's field hockey player. Sablowski plays as a midfielder.

She made her debut for the Australia women's national hockey team, commonly referred to as the Hockeyroos, at age 17. Her Australian Hockey League (AHL) team is the New South Wales Arrows. Sablowski was a talented junior player; she was selected into the Australian under-21s team to compete in the Junior World Cup in 2005 at the age of 16. At this tournament she was named one of the best players for the under-21s age group in the world.

After making the 2008 Beijing Olympic team, Sablowski was described by Australian coach, Frank Murray, as possibly becoming the best player in the world. Since making her debut, she has been a key member of the Hockeyroos. She scored four goals at the 2008 Beijing Olympics and at the 2009 Women's Champions Trophy in Sydney, Sablowski again scored four goals making her the second highest goal scorer at the tournament and Australia's highest goal scorer. She was a very important member of the Hockeyroos that competed in the 2009 Champions Trophy in Sydney that won silver against Argentina. In 2009 Sablowski was named the International Young Player of the Year and was named in the International All Star Team.

At the 2010 Commonwealth Games in Delhi, she was a member of the Australian team that won the gold medal by defeating New Zealand 4–2 on penalty strokes.

In 2012 she competed for Australia at the 2012 Summer Olympics.

In 2014, she was part of the Australian team that won gold at the 20th Commonwealth Games. She scored the first penalty in the shoot out that decided the final against England.

In 2016, she played in the Rio 2016 Olympic Games.
