= Ashleigh Nelson (field hockey) =

Australian field hockey player

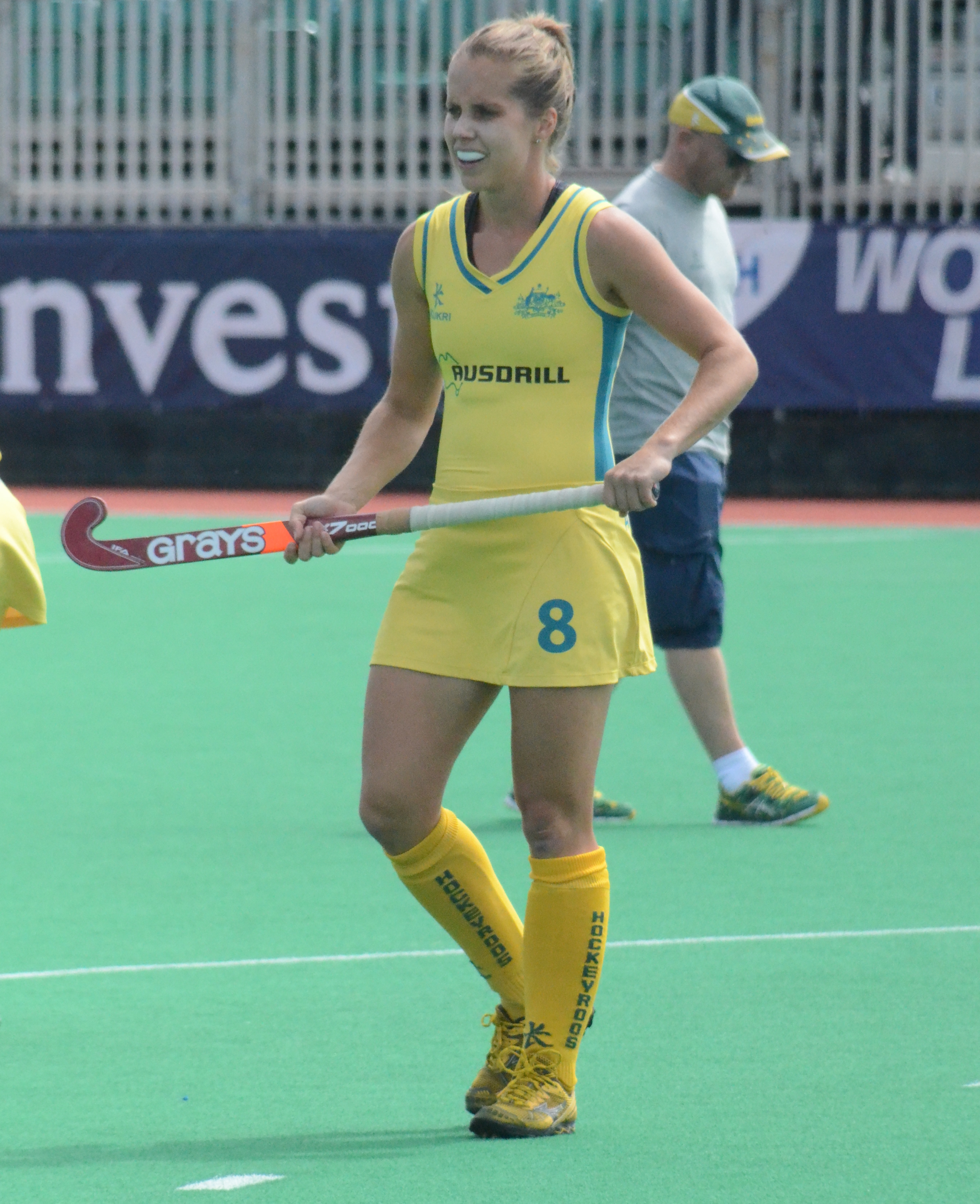
- Nelson in 2013

Personal information
- Born: 5 March 1987 (age 39) Narrogin, Western Australia, Australia
- Height: 1.66 m (5 ft 5 in)

Sport
- Sport: Field hockey
- Position: Forward
National team
Years	Team	Caps	Goals
2007–present	Australia	205	(69)
Medal record
Women's Field hockey
Representing Australia
World Cup Rosario 2010 [London Olympics 2012]
Silver medal – second place	2014 The Hague	Team
Champions Trophy
Silver medal – second place	2014 Mendoza	Team
Commonwealth Games
Gold medal – first place	2010 Delhi	Team
Gold medal – first place	2014 Glasgow	Team
- Updated on 8 December 2016

Ashleigh Jayne Nelson (born 5 March 1987 in Narrogin) is an Australian hockey player, a striker for the Australia women's national field hockey team.

Nelson made her international debut in 2007 against Japan and by the end of her career she had played 205 games for Australia, scoring 69 international goals and awarded Australian Highest Goal scorer twice. She has played in many international tournaments, including the 2010 Commonwealth Games in Delhi, where she secured a field goal from lying on the ground as well as a penalty flick. Australia defeated New Zealand for the gold medal in penalty flicks 4–2 after drawing with them 2–2 after 15 minutes of extra time. She also played in the World Cup in Argentina in 2010 and the Champion's Trophy in Sydney in 2009 where she scored her first goal against China. She became an Olympian in London 2012 and was selected for her second World Cup at The Hague and Commonwealth Games in Glasgow in 2014. Nelson was sponsored by Grays and wore the number 8 for the Hockeyroos.

Nelson announced her retirement from international hockey on 14 July 2017. Nelson indicated her decision was due to the challenges of rehabilitation from a knee injury which ruled her out of contention for the 2016 Rio Olympic Games.

Ashleigh wears the number 14 for the Smokefree WA Diamonds. She debuted in 2006 and won 4 out of 5 AHL finals. She was voted best on ground in the 2010 final against Queensland and was the highest goal scorer in 2010 for both the AHL and Australian Hockeyroos. She was part of the 2012 Summer Olympic squad and the gold medal winning squad at the 2014 Commonwealth Games.

After retiring from international hockey in 2017, Nelson moved into a media career including as a commentator for the Epicentre.tv coverage of the Australian Hockey League finals in 2017. She currently works as a Sports Reporter for Channel 10 news after completing a Diploma in Media at Edith Cowan University.

Nelson grew up in Wagin, in rural Western Australia, where she began playing hockey at the age of 5. She attended boarding school at Santa Maria College for her high school years and was honoured with the title of Head Girl of the college in 2004. She graduated from Curtin University 2010 with a Bachelor of Science degree in Occupational Therapy.

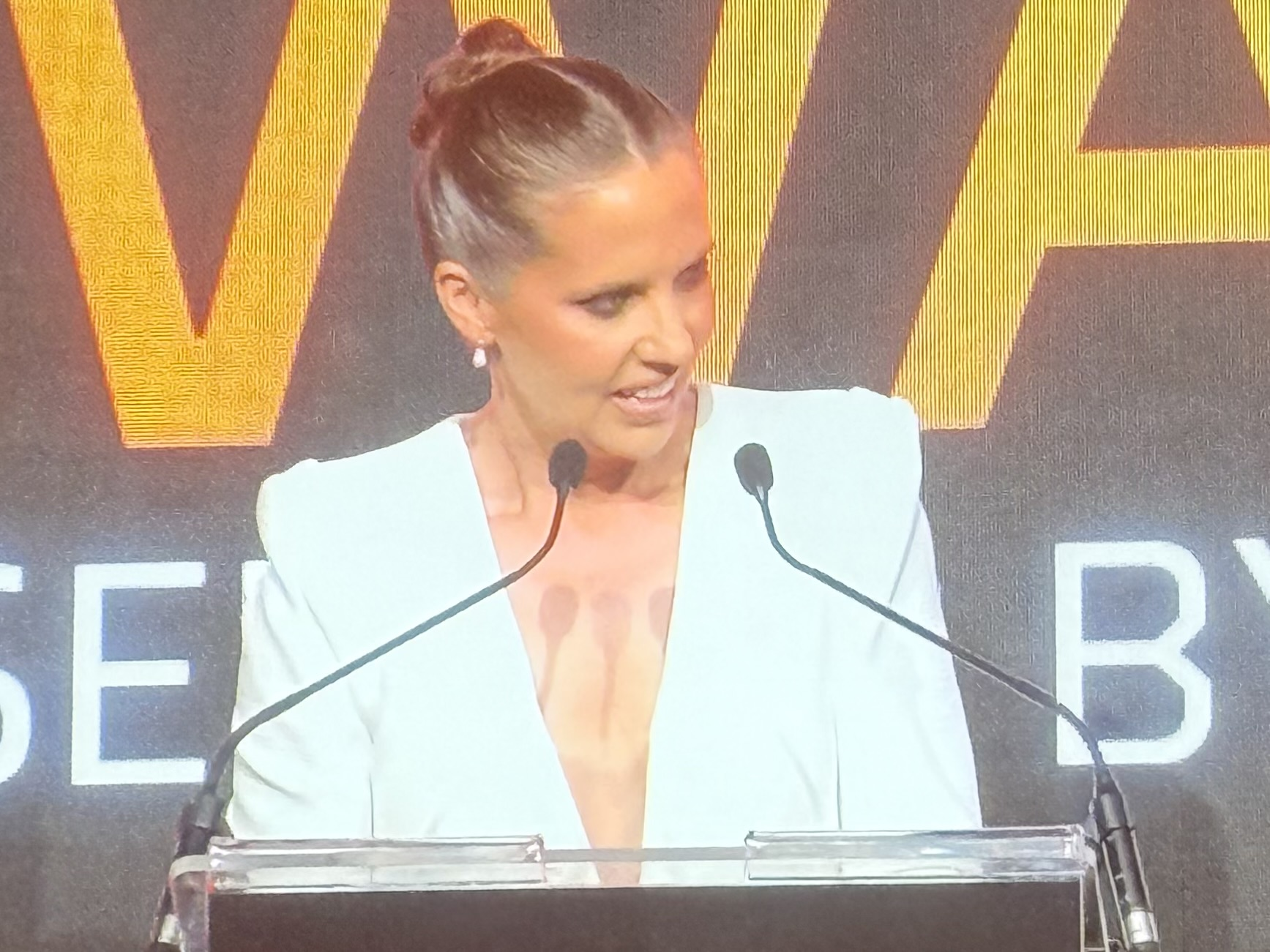
Nelson in February 2026, serving as MC of the 2025 WA Sport Awards at Crown Perth
