= New Zealand women's national field hockey team results (2011–2015) =

Results of the Black Sticks from 2011 until 2015

The following article comprises the results of the Black Sticks, the women's national field hockey team from New Zealand, from 2011 until 2015. New fixtures can be found on the International Hockey Federation's results portal.

== Match results ==
=== 2011 Results ===
Statistics	Pld	W	D	L	GF	GA	GD	Pts
New Zealand	29	17	5	7	74	54	+20	56

Source: FIH

==== South Korea Test Series ====
5 February 2011 Test Match	New Zealand	4–1	South Korea	Auckland, New Zealand
17:00	S. Harrison 30'; Eshuis 32'; Finlayson 58'; Forgesson 65'	Report	Kim Jong-E. 53'	Stadium: Lloyd Elsmore Hockey Stadium

8 February 2011 Test Match	New Zealand	2–1	South Korea	Whangārei, New Zealand
18:00	Forgesson 6'; Glynn 63'	Report	Kim Jong-E. 26'	Stadium: Northland Hockey Association

10 February 2011 Test Match	New Zealand	2–1	South Korea	Whangārei, New Zealand
19:30	Michelsen 16'; Punt 51'	Report	Eum 58'	Stadium: Northland Hockey Association

12 February 2011 Test Match	New Zealand	5–1	South Korea	Auckland, New Zealand
17:00	Whitelock 13'; Flynn 21'; Finlayson 30'; Glynn 47'; C. Harrison 54'	Report	Cheon S. 69'	Stadium: Lloyd Elsmore Hockey Stadium

13 February 2011 Test Match	New Zealand	3–1	South Korea	Auckland, New Zealand
17:00	Forgesson 17'; Eshuis 55'; Glynn 59'	Report	Lee Yo. 45'	Stadium: Lloyd Elsmore Hockey Stadium

==== Japan Test Series ====
11 March 2011 Test Match	New Zealand	0–2	Japan	Rosedale, Auckland, New Zealand
16:00		Report	Katamine 34'; Murakami 55'	Stadium: North Harbour Hockey Stadium

13 March 2011 Test Match	New Zealand	2–1	Japan	Hamilton, New Zealand
18:00	Glynn 6'; Eshuis 30'	Report	Yamamoto 35'	Stadium: Waikato Hockey Association

14 March 2011 Test Match	New Zealand	4–3	Japan	Hamilton, New Zealand
18:00	Punt 13'; Glynn 22'; Michelsen 45'; C. Harrison 55'	Report	Otsuka 10'; Shibata 39'; Katamine 57'	Stadium: Waikato Hockey Association

16 March 2011 Test Match	New Zealand	2–2	Japan	Rosedale, Auckland, New Zealand
16:00	Gunson 2'; Glynn 61'	Report	Otsuka 12'; Shibata 44'	Stadium: North Harbour Hockey Stadium

17 March 2011 Test Match	New Zealand	2–0	Japan	Rosedale, Auckland, New Zealand
16:00	Glynn 16', 39'	Report		Stadium: North Harbour Hockey Stadium

==== Argentina Test Series ====
26 March 2011 Test Match	New Zealand	1–1	Argentina	Whangārei, New Zealand
17:00	Finlayson 22'	Report	D'Elía 56'	Stadium: Northland Hockey Association

28 March 2011 Test Match	New Zealand	1–6	Argentina	Rosedale, Auckland, New Zealand
18:00	Finlayson 42'	Report	González Canda 4'; D'Elía 14'; Merino 22', 61'; Barrionuevo 49'; D. Sruoga 53'	Stadium: North Harbour Hockey Stadium

29 March 2011 Test Match	New Zealand	2–1	Argentina	Rosedale, Auckland, New Zealand
18:00	Eshuis 58'; Finlayson 70'	Report	D. Sruoga 64'	Stadium: North Harbour Hockey Stadium

==== Germany Test Series ====
12 June 2011 Test Match	Germany	3–4	New Zealand	Berlin, Germany
18:00	Mävers 4'; Bachmann 21'; Frank 22'	Report	Finlayson 5'; Forgesson 41'; C. Harrison 45'; Sharland 63'	Stadium: Berliner HC

13 June 2011 Test Match	Germany	3–3	New Zealand	Berlin, Germany
17:00	Hillmann 12'; Mävers 19'; Teschke 67'	Report	C. Harrison 27', 68'; Gunson 62'	Stadium: Berliner HC

==== XIX FIH Champions Trophy ====
25 June 2011 Group Stage	Germany	1–0	New Zealand	Amsterdam, Netherlands
14:00	Müller 28'	Report		Stadium: Wagener Stadium

26 June 2011 Group Stage	Australia	2–3	New Zealand	Amsterdam, Netherlands
14:00	Close 52'; Eastham 64'	Report	Glynn 10'; Forgesson 11'; Finlayson 44'	Stadium: Wagener Stadium

28 June 2011 Group Stage	Netherlands	0–0	New Zealand	Amsterdam, Netherlands
17:00		Report		Stadium: Wagener Stadium

30 June 2011 Medal Round	South Korea	5–3	New Zealand	Amsterdam, Netherlands
17:00	Kim Jong-H. 7', 55', 67'; Hong Y. 13'; Kim Jong-E. 42'	Report	Glynn 26'; C. Harrison 27'; Finlayson 43'	Stadium: Wagener Stadium

2 July 2011 Medal Round	Argentina	3–2	New Zealand	Amsterdam, Netherlands
10:00	García 14'; Aymar 24'; Sánchez Moccia 29'	Report	Eshuis 35+'; C. Harrison 37'	Stadium: Wagener Stadium

3 July 2011 Bronze Medal Match	Argentina	2–3	New Zealand	Amsterdam, Netherlands
14:00	Kim Jong-E. 42', 56'	Report	Glynn 15'; Forgesson 16'; C. Harrison 70+'	Stadium: Wagener Stadium

==== United States Test Series ====
4 September 2011 Test Match	United States	1–2	New Zealand	Chula Vista, United States
14:00	35'	Report	Forgesson 4'; Finlayson 43'	Stadium: United States Olympic Training Center

5 September 2011 Test Match	United States	0–4	New Zealand	Chula Vista, United States
14:00		Report	Glynn 7', 11'; Finlayson 27'; Forgesson 51'	Stadium: United States Olympic Training Center

7 September 2011 Test Match	United States	0–4	New Zealand	Chula Vista, United States
14:00		Report	Flynn 11', 43'; Glynn 19'; Forgesson 31'	Stadium: United States Olympic Training Center

9 September 2011 Test Match	United States	5–3	New Zealand	Chula Vista, United States
14:00	Kasold 4'; Reinprecht 31', 43'; Selenski 35', 61'	Report	Glynn 40', 48'; Forgesson 66'	Stadium: United States Olympic Training Center

11 September 2011 Test Match	United States	1–5	New Zealand	Chula Vista, United States
14:00	4'	Report	Forgesson 37', 62'; S. Harrison 40'; Glynn 47'; Sharland 56'	Stadium: United States Olympic Training Center

==== VII Oceania Cup ====
6 October 2011 Match 1	Australia	2–1	New Zealand	Hobart, Australia
19:30	Flanagan 25', 32'	Report	Glynn 4'	Stadium: Tasmanian Hockey Centre

8 October 2011 Match 2	Australia	3–3	New Zealand	Hobart, Australia
13:00	Flanagan 21'; Eastham 56'; Smith 62'	Report	Naylor 7'; S. Harrison 8'; Punt 35'	Stadium: Tasmanian Hockey Centre

9 October 2011 Match 3	Australia	2–4	New Zealand	Hobart, Australia
13:00	Schulz 14'; Messent 35'	Report	C. Harrison 7'; Sharland 20'; Eshuis 58'; Michelsen 62'	Stadium: Tasmanian Hockey Centre

=== 2012 Results ===
Statistics	Pld	W	D	L	GF	GA	GD	Pts
New Zealand	44	17	9	18	99	104	−5	60

Source: FIH

==== Four Nations (Córdoba) ====
18 January 2012 Group Stage	Argentina	7–3	New Zealand	Córdoba, Argentina
22:00	Maccari 5'; Merino 15'; Barrionuevo 40', 48', 52', 69'; Rebecchi 70'	Report	Forgesson 2'; Finlayson 17', 44'	Stadium: Soledad García Stadium

19 January 2012 Group Stage	New Zealand	4–6	South Korea	Córdoba, Argentina
19:30	Flynn 10'; Charlton 15'; Punt 27'; C. Harrison 56'	Report	Park M. 22'; Kim Jong-E. 25'; Lee S. 33', 70'; Hong 51'; Han 54'	Stadium: Soledad García Stadium

21 January 2012 Group Stage	New Zealand	0–2	Great Britain	Córdoba, Argentina
17:00		Report	Walsh 11'; Danson 20'	Stadium: Soledad García Stadium

22 January 2012 Third Place Match	Argentina	3–2 (a.e.t.)	New Zealand	Córdoba, Argentina
17:00	Merino 28'; Maccari 56'; D'Elía 80'	Report	King 21'; Punt 47'	Stadium: Soledad García Stadium

==== XX FIH Champions Trophy ====
28 January 2012 Group Stage	Argentina	2–2	New Zealand	Rosario, Argentina
20:00	Cavallero 51'; Merino 66'	Report	Michelsen 28'; S. Harrison 49'	Stadium: Estadio Mundialista de Hockey

29 January 2012 Group Stage	New Zealand	2–2	South Korea	Rosario, Argentina
17:30	Finlayson 9'; Glynn 25'	Report	Kim O. 44'; Kim J. 56'	Stadium: Estadio Mundialista de Hockey

31 January 2012 Group Stage	New Zealand	1–3	Germany	Rosario, Argentina
17:30	Punt 60'	Report	Hasselmann 5', 9'; Hahn 21'	Stadium: Estadio Mundialista de Hockey

2 February 2012 Quarter-Finals	Netherlands	3–0	New Zealand	Rosario, Argentina
12:30	Lammers 25'; Paumen 41'; Welten 57'	Report		Stadium: Estadio Mundialista de Hockey

3 February 2012 Crossover	New Zealand	3–2 (a.e.t.)	China	Rosario, Argentina
20:00	Finlayson 60', 67'; Michelsen 77'	Report	Gao Lihua 24'; Song Qingling 41'	Stadium: Estadio Mundialista de Hockey

5 February 2012 Fifth Place Match	New Zealand	3–4 (a.e.t.)	Japan	Rosario, Argentina
15:00	Glynn 41', 69'; Michelsen 53'	Report	Shibata 3'; Tanaka 15'; Fujio 59'; Komazawa 78'	Stadium: Estadio Mundialista de Hockey

==== Argentina Test Series ====
12 March 2012 Test Match	New Zealand	1–4	Argentina	Auckland, New Zealand
18:30	King 17'	Report	Luchetti 5', 41'; D. Sruoga 12'; Merino 25'	Stadium: Lloyd Elsmore Hockey Stadium

14 March 2012 Test Match	New Zealand	1–1	Argentina	Rosedale, Auckland, New Zealand
18:30	Finlayson 68'	Report	Merino 2'	Stadium: North Harbour Hockey Stadium

16 March 2012 Test Match	New Zealand	0–0	Argentina	Auckland, New Zealand
18:30		Report		Stadium: Lloyd Elsmore Hockey Stadium

17 March 2012 Test Match	New Zealand	3–4	Argentina	Rosedale, Auckland, New Zealand
18:30	Glynn 4'; Flynn 27'; Eshuis 40'	Report	Rebecchi 8', 50'; J. Sruoga 16'; Cavallero 18'	Stadium: North Harbour Hockey Stadium

==== Four Nations (North Harbour) ====
12 April 2012 Group Stage	New Zealand	2–1	India	Rosedale, Auckland, New Zealand
18:30	Punt 3'; Glynn 24'	Report	Anuradha 40'	Stadium: North Harbour Hockey Stadium

13 April 2012 Group Stage	New Zealand	1–3	Australia	Rosedale, Auckland, New Zealand
18:30	Glynn 34'	Report	Boyce 33'; Schulz 57'; Nelson 62'	Stadium: North Harbour Hockey Stadium

15 April 2012 Group Stage	United States	1–3	New Zealand	Rosedale, Auckland, New Zealand
18:30	Taylor 33'	Report	C. Harrison 23'; Glynn 43', 58'	Stadium: North Harbour Hockey Stadium

16 April 2012 Final	Australia	2–3	New Zealand	Rosedale, Auckland, New Zealand
18:30	Flanagan 51'; Schulz 64'	Report	Sharland 12'; Glynn 43'; S. Harrison 54'	Stadium: North Harbour Hockey Stadium

==== Four Nations (Auckland) ====
18 April 2012 Group Stage	New Zealand	3–3	Australia	Auckland, New Zealand
15:00	Punt 7', 70'; Sharland 55'	Report	Smith 15'; Schulz 44'; Nanscawen 48'	Stadium: Lloyd Elsmore Hockey Stadium

19 April 2012 Group Stage	United States	3–3	New Zealand	Auckland, New Zealand
15:00	Dawson 15'; Smith 55'	Report	C. Harrison 20'; Flynn 31'; Glynn 40'	Stadium: Lloyd Elsmore Hockey Stadium

21 April 2012 Group Stage	New Zealand	2–3	India	Auckland, New Zealand
19:30	Glynn 6'; Finlayson 10'; Forgesson 67'	Report	Rani 15'; Vandana 55'; Chanchan 56'	Stadium: Lloyd Elsmore Hockey Stadium

22 April 2012 Final	Australia	3–1	New Zealand	Auckland, New Zealand
19:30	Nelson 7'; Close 8'; Nanscawen 15'	Report	Glynn 49'	Stadium: Lloyd Elsmore Hockey Stadium

==== China Test Series ====
29 May 2012 Test Match	China	1–2	New Zealand	Beijing, China
18:00	Ma Y. 10'	Report	Punt 11'; Glynn 67'	Stadium: Olympic Green Hockey Field

30 May 2012 Test Match	China	1–2	New Zealand	Beijing, China
18:00	Zhao 49'	Report	Webster 33'; C. Harrison 42'	Stadium: Olympic Green Hockey Field

1 June 2012 Test Match	China	1–0	New Zealand	Beijing, China
18:00	Zhao 23'	Report		Stadium: Olympic Green Hockey Field

==== South Korea Test Series ====
4 June 2012 Test Match	South Korea	3–2	New Zealand	Seoul, South Korea
19:00		Report	Glynn 36'; Forgesson 38'	Stadium: Taereung Training Center

6 June 2012 Test Match	South Korea	4–3	New Zealand	Seoul, South Korea
19:00		Report	Glynn 2'; S. Harrison 61'; Flynn 64'	Stadium: Taereung Training Center

7 June 2012 Test Match	South Korea	4–3	New Zealand	Seoul, South Korea
19:00		Report	S. Harrison 25'; Michelsen 37'; C. Harrison 42'	Stadium: Taereung Training Center

==== IV Four Nations Cup ====
12 July 2012 Match 1	New Zealand	4–2	Belgium	Bremen, Germany
16:15	C. Harrison 15'; Glynn 19'; Michelsen 29'; S. Harrison 37'	Report	De Groof 28'; Boon 64'

14 July 2012 Match 2	South Africa	0–1	New Zealand	Bremen, Germany
16:00		Report	S. Harrison 19'

15 July 2012 Match 3	New Zealand	1–5	Germany	Bremen, Germany
14:30	C. Harrison 45'	Report	Mävers 10'; Otte 22'; Rinne 43'; Keller 57'; Hahn 61'

==== XXX Olympic Games ====
29 July 2012 Group Stage	New Zealand	1–0	Australia	London, United Kingdom
08:30	Finlayson 3'	Report		Stadium: Riverbank Arena

31 July 2012 Group Stage	South Africa	1–4	New Zealand	London, United Kingdom
12:45	Coetzee 52'	Report	C. Harrison 2'; Eshuis 22'; Sharland 29', 61'	Stadium: Riverbank Arena

2 August 2012 Group Stage	New Zealand	1–2	Argentina	London, United Kingdom
21:15	C. Harrison 62'	Report	Rebecchi 3', 45'	Stadium: Riverbank Arena

4 August 2012 Group Stage	United States	2–3	New Zealand	London, United Kingdom
19:00	O'Donnell 16'; Laubach 34'	Report	Sharland 3'; Flynn 19'; Eshuis 64'	Stadium: Riverbank Arena

6 August 2012 Group Stage	New Zealand	0–0	Germany	London, United Kingdom
08:30		Report		Stadium: Riverbank Arena

8 August 2012 Semi-Final	Netherlands	2–2 (3–1 p)	New Zealand	London, United Kingdom
15:30	Paumen 32', 53'	Report	Sharland 7'; Forgesson 49'	Stadium: Riverbank Arena
	Penalties
	Van As (penalty shoot-out scored); Paumen (penalty shoot-out missed); De Goede (penalty shoot-out scored); Van Geffen (penalty shoot-out missed); Hoog (penalty shoot-out scored)		(penalty shoot-out missed) Sharland; (penalty shoot-out scored) Michelsen; (penalty shoot-out missed) Flynn; (penalty shoot-out missed) Punt

10 August 2012 Bronze Medal Match	New Zealand	1–3	Great Britain	London, United Kingdom
15:30	Michelsen 68'	Report	Danson 45'; Cullen 59'; Thomas 63'	Stadium: Riverbank Arena

==== India Test Series ====
8 December 2012 Test Match	New Zealand	7–2	India	Napier, New Zealand
19:00	King 18'; Merry 28', 63'; Glynn 33', 41', 54'; Punt 57'	Report		Stadium: Hawke's Bay Sports Park

9 December 2012 Test Match	New Zealand	3–1	India	Napier, New Zealand
17:30	Fremaux 46'; Punt 61'; C. Harrison 62'	Report		Stadium: Hawke's Bay Sports Park

11 December 2012 Test Match	New Zealand	3–1	India	Palmerston North, New Zealand
18:30	31'; Glynn 49'; Curtis 59'	Report		Stadium: Hockey Manawatu Inc

12 December 2012 Test Match	New Zealand	2–2	India	Palmerston North, New Zealand
18:00	Fremaux 14', 60'	Report	Vandana 31'; Ritu 35'	Stadium: Hockey Manawatu Inc

14 December 2012 Test Match	New Zealand	4–1	India	Wellington, New Zealand
19:00	Glynn 2', 18'; Punt 43'; Curtis 55'	Report	Jaspreet 56'	Stadium: National Hockey Centre

15 December 2012 Test Match	New Zealand	6–5	India	Wellington, New Zealand
19:00	Glynn (2 Goals); Merry (1 Goal); Michelsen (1 Goal); Reid (1 Goal) (1 Own Goal)	Report		Stadium: National Hockey Centre

=== 2013 Results ===
Statistics	Pld	W	D	L	GF	GA	GD	Pts
New Zealand	32	17	5	10	130	56	+74	56

Source: FIH

==== Argentina Test Series ====
23 February 2013 Test Match	Argentina	4–1	New Zealand	Rosario, Argentina
20:30	D. Sruoga 23'; Rebecchi 25', 61'; Barrionuevo 35+'	Report	Flynn 67'	Stadium: Estadio Mundialista de Hockey

24 February 2013 Test Match	Argentina	1–1	New Zealand	Rosario, Argentina
20:00	Barrionuevo 8'	Report	Michelsen 32'	Stadium: Estadio Mundialista de Hockey

26 February 2013 Test Match	Argentina	1–4	New Zealand	Rosario, Argentina
21:00	Juárez 50'	Report	Glynn 34'; Punt 38', 60'; Forgesson 40'	Stadium: Estadio Mundialista de Hockey

28 February 2013 Test Match	Argentina	3–3	New Zealand	Rosario, Argentina
21:00	Barrionuevo 15'; Cavallero 21'; Rebecchi 27'	Report	Glynn 5'; Punt 30'; Flynn 40'	Stadium: Estadio Mundialista de Hockey

1 March 2013 Test Match	Argentina	1–0	New Zealand	Rosario, Argentina
18:30	Merino 7'	Report		Stadium: Estadio Mundialista de Hockey

==== Four Nations (Whangārei) ====
10 April 2013 Group Stage	New Zealand	3–4	South Korea	Whangārei, New Zealand
19:30	Harrison 41'; Fremaux 44'; Michelsen 62'	Report	Hong 14'; Park M. 36'; Kim D. 43', 54'	Stadium: Northland Hockey Association

11 April 2013 Group Stage	Argentina	1–2	New Zealand	Whangārei, New Zealand
19:30	Cavallero 25'	Report	Harrison 31'; Glynn 62'	Stadium: Northland Hockey Association

13 April 2013 Group Stage	New Zealand	5–0	United States	Whangārei, New Zealand
15:00	Fremaux 29'; Sharland 51'; Punt 59'; Forgesson 66'; Webster 68'	Report		Stadium: Northland Hockey Association

14 April 2013 Final	New Zealand	3–0	South Korea	Whangārei, New Zealand
15:30	Fremaux 28', 43'; Glynn 33'	Report		Stadium: Northland Hockey Association

==== Four Nations (Hamilton + Tauranga) ====
17 April 2013 Group Stage	New Zealand	2–2	Argentina	Hamilton, New Zealand
19:00	Michelsen 55'; Harrison 70'	Report	Cavallero 11'; Rebecchi 41'	Stadium: Gallagher Hockey Centre

18 April 2013 Group Stage	New Zealand	1–0	United States	Hamilton, New Zealand
19:00	Curtis 17'	Report		Stadium: Gallagher Hockey Centre

20 April 2013 Group Stage	South Korea	1–5	New Zealand	Tauranga, New Zealand
15:00	Cheon S. 21'	Report	Glynn 32', 35', 38', 44'; Merry 65'	Stadium: Blake Park

21 April 2013 Final	New Zealand	1–5	Argentina	Tauranga, New Zealand
15:00	Reid 48'	Report	Merino 15'; Rebecchi 27', 35'; Aymar 28'; Juárez 50'	Stadium: Blake Park

==== I FIH World League Semi-Finals ====
13 June 2013 Group Stage	New Zealand	7–0	India	Rotterdam, Netherlands
09:00	Harrison 8', 52'; 16'; Glynn 26', 69'; Fremaux 31'; Forgesson 53'	Report		Stadium: HC Rotterdam

14 June 2013 Group Stage	Germany	3–2	New Zealand	Rotterdam, Netherlands
15:30	Müller 8'; Hoffmann 15'; Hauke 67'	Report	Harrison 66'; Sharland 70'	Stadium: HC Rotterdam

16 June 2013 Group Stage	New Zealand	4–2	Belgium	Rotterdam, Netherlands
14:00	Forgesson 21'; Sharland 25'; Flynn 29'; Glynn 38'	Report	Versavel 52'; Coppey 68'	Stadium: HC Rotterdam

18 June 2013 Quarter-Finals	New Zealand	3–1	Japan	Rotterdam, Netherlands
12:30	Forgesson 40'; Punt 54'; Harrison 66'	Report	2'	Stadium: HC Rotterdam

20 June 2013 Semi-Finals	Netherlands	5–2	New Zealand	Rotterdam, Netherlands
20:00	Van Geffen 4'; Lammers 13', 54'; Jonker 16'; Van Male 55'	Report	Webster 25'; Glynn 62'	Stadium: HC Rotterdam

22 June 2013 Third Place Match	New Zealand	3–3 (2–3 p)	South Korea	Rotterdam, Netherlands
14:00	Forgesson 12'; Glynn 24'; Sharland 27'	Report	Han 1', 29'; Park S. 16'	Stadium: HC Rotterdam
	Penalties
	Sharland (penalty shoot-out scored); Punt (penalty shoot-out missed); Charlton (penalty shoot-out scored); Harrison (penalty shoot-out missed); Flynn (penalty shoot-out missed)		(penalty shoot-out missed) Han; (penalty shoot-out missed) Kim D. (penalty shoot-out scored) Cheon E. (penalty shoot-out scored) Cho E. (penalty shoot-out scored) Park S.

==== VIII Oceania Cup ====
30 October 2013 Group Stage	New Zealand	3–2	Australia	Stratford, New Zealand
17:00	Flynn 7'; Webster 34'; Cocks 60'	Report	White 25'; Peris 31'	Stadium: TET MultiSports Centre

31 October 2013 Group Stage	Papua New Guinea	0–25	New Zealand	Stratford, New Zealand
17:30		Report	Flynn 4', 21', 34', 58'; Punt 6', 43', 55', 59'; Cocks 12', 19', 33', 57', 60', 69'; Forgesson 13', 22', 54'; Sharland 15', 25'; Charlton 17'; Webster 23', 28', 65'; Dennison 62'; King 67'	Stadium: TET MultiSports Centre

2 November 2013 Group Stage	New Zealand	26–0	Samoa	Stratford, New Zealand
12:00	Punt 5', 16', 48'; Keddell 7', 29', 43'; Flynn 8', 22', 34'; Charlton 9', 70'; Cocks 11'; Webster 13', 18'; Merry 14', 44', 46', 53'; Thompson 14'; Forgesson 23', 63'; King 38', 58', 70+'; Blackwood 50'; Sharland 61'	Report		Stadium: TET MultiSports Centre

3 November 2013 Gold Medal Match	New Zealand	2–2 (4–5 p)	Australia	Stratford, New Zealand
14:00	Forgesson 17'; Webster 55'	Report	Holzberger 5'; Blyth 62'	Stadium: TET MultiSports Centre
	Penalties
	Sharland (penalty shoot-out scored); Charlton (penalty shoot-out missed); Dennison (penalty shoot-out scored); Flynn (penalty shoot-out scored); Punt (penalty shoot-out missed); Sharland (penalty shoot-out scored); Charlton (penalty shoot-out missed)		(penalty shoot-out scored) Blyth; (penalty shoot-out scored) White; (penalty shoot-out missed) Flanagan; (penalty shoot-out missed) Parker; (penalty shoot-out scored) Messent; (penalty shoot-out scored) Blyth; (penalty shoot-out scored) White

==== Chile Test Series ====
20 November 2013 Test Match	Chile	2–6	New Zealand	Santiago, Chile
12:00		Report	Sharland 30', 60'; King 42'; Merry 47'; Forgesson 55'; Keddell 66'	Stadium: Club Deportivo Manquehue

21 November 2013 Test Match	Chile	0–7	New Zealand	Santiago, Chile
12:00		Report	Webster 3'; Dennison 8'; Flynn 10'; Forgesson 24', 61'; Sharland 43', 55'	Stadium: Club Deportivo Manquehue

23 November 2013 Test Match	Chile	2–3	New Zealand	Santiago, Chile
12:00		Report	Cocks 25'; Webster 26'; Punt 41'	Stadium: Club Deportivo Manquehue

==== I FIH World League Final ====
30 November 2013 Group Stage	New Zealand	0–2	China	San Miguel de Tucumán, Argentina
18:30		Report	Cui 7'; Huang 61'	Stadium: Club Natación y Gimnasia

1 December 2013 Group Stage	New Zealand	1–2	Argentina	San Miguel de Tucumán, Argentina
21:00	Punt 21'	Report	Merino 24', 40'	Stadium: Club Natación y Gimnasia

3 December 2013 Group Stage	Australia	5–1	New Zealand	San Miguel de Tucumán, Argentina
18:30	Parker 11'; Nelson 22'; White 42', 66'; Schulz 54'	Report	Webster 13'	Stadium: Club Natación y Gimnasia

5 December 2013 Quarter-Finals	Netherlands	1–0	New Zealand	San Miguel de Tucumán, Argentina
09:00	Welten 41'	Report		Stadium: Club Natación y Gimnasia

7 December 2013 Crossover	New Zealand	3–1	South Korea	San Miguel de Tucumán, Argentina
09:00	Sharland 7'; Webster 17'; Flynn 37'	Report	Han 59'	Stadium: Club Natación y Gimnasia

8 December 2013 Fifth Place Match	New Zealand	1–0	China	San Miguel de Tucumán, Argentina
11:30	Sharland 56'	Report		Stadium: Club Natación y Gimnasia

=== 2014 Results ===
Statistics	Pld	W	D	L	GF	GA	GD	Pts
New Zealand	48	22	9	17	131	75	+56	75

Source: FIH

==== United States Tour ====
11 February 2014 Test Match	New Zealand	1–2	Great Britain	Chula Vista, United States
14:00	Punt 25'	Report	Kidd 56'; Webb 59'	Stadium: United States Olympic Training Center

12 February 2014 Test Match	United States	3–3	New Zealand	Chula Vista, United States
14:00	Falgowski 25'; Sharkey 50'; Reinprecht 51'	Report	Flynn 37'; Punt 63'; Fremaux 66'	Stadium: United States Olympic Training Center

14 February 2014 Test Match	New Zealand	1–0	Great Britain	Chula Vista, United States
14:00	Merry 32'	Report		Stadium: United States Olympic Training Center

15 February 2014 Test Match	United States	2–2	New Zealand	Chula Vista, United States
14:00	Selenski 3'; Sharkey 41'	Report	Punt 17'; Grant 30'	Stadium: United States Olympic Training Center

17 February 2014 Test Match	United States	1–2	New Zealand	Chula Vista, United States
11:30	Selenski 63'	Report	Merry 29'; Punt 70+'	Stadium: United States Olympic Training Center

==== South Korea Test Series ====
28 March 2014 Test Match	New Zealand	3–4	South Korea	Auckland, New Zealand
18:00	Flynn 17'; Punt 34'; Fremaux 51'	Report	Park M. 20', 55'; Cho Y. 48'; Kim J. 60'	Stadium: Lloyd Elsmore Hockey Stadium

29 March 2014 Test Match	New Zealand	3–4	South Korea	Auckland, New Zealand
16:30	Cocks 20'; Merry 26', 67'	Report	Han 10', 30'; Park K. 55'; Cheon S. 70+'	Stadium: Lloyd Elsmore Hockey Stadium

==== China Test Series ====
31 March 2014 Test Match	New Zealand	3–2	China	Taupō, New Zealand
18:00	Naylor 25'; Cocks 46'; Grant 48'	Report	De 12'; Wang M. 27'	Stadium: Taupo Hockey Club

1 April 2014 Test Match	New Zealand	1–1	China	Taupō, New Zealand
18:00	Dennison 26'	Report	Peng 42'	Stadium: Taupo Hockey Club

==== I Hawke's Bay Cup ====
5 April 2014 Group Stage	New Zealand	3–1	South Korea	Hastings, New Zealand
16:00	Punt 28'; Webster 34'; Merry 48'	Report	An 56'	Stadium: Taupo Hockey Club

6 April 2014 Group Stage	New Zealand	1–2	China	Hastings, New Zealand
16:00	Punt 37'	Report	Wang M. 46', 56'	Stadium: Taupo Hockey Club

8 April 2014 Group Stage	Argentina	3–2	New Zealand	Hastings, New Zealand
19:00	Rebecchi 5', 66'; Aymar 40'	Report	Punt 44'; Whitelock 55'	Stadium: Taupo Hockey Club

10 April 2014 Group Stage	New Zealand	6–2	Japan	Hastings, New Zealand
19:00	Rebecchi 5', 66'; Aymar 40'	Report	Nakagawa 15'; Oikawa 57'	Stadium: Taupo Hockey Club

12 April 2014 Group Stage	Australia	4–2	New Zealand	Hastings, New Zealand
15:30	Nanscawen 11'; Peris 23'; Claxton 28'; Kenny 62'	Report	Fremaux 3'; Punt 33'	Stadium: Taupo Hockey Club

13 April 2014 Third Place Match	New Zealand	2–3	China	Hastings, New Zealand
13:30	Webster 14'; Keddell 22'	Report	Liang 1'; Xi 28'; Huang 30'	Stadium: Taupo Hockey Club

==== XIII FIH World Cup ====
31 May 2014 Group Stage	New Zealand	4–3	Belgium	The Hague, Netherlands
13:00	Forgesson 20', 26'; Punt 35'; Whitelock 44'	Report	Nelen 46'; Sinia 49'; De Groof 55'	Stadium: Kyocera Stadium

2 June 2014 Group Stage	South Korea	1–0	New Zealand	The Hague, Netherlands
14:30	Kim D. 30'	Report		Stadium: GreenFields Stadium

5 June 2014 Group Stage	New Zealand	0–2	Netherlands	The Hague, Netherlands
19:45		Report	Dirkse van den Heuvel 5'; Lammers 30'	Stadium: Kyocera Stadium

7 June 2014 Group Stage	Japan	1–4	New Zealand	The Hague, Netherlands
17:30	Nagai 51'	Report	Cocks 5'; Punt 38', 69'; Glynn 39'	Stadium: GreenFields Stadium

9 June 2014 Group Stage	New Zealand	0–0	Australia	The Hague, Netherlands
10:30		Report		Stadium: Kyocera Stadium

14 June 2014 Fifth Place Match	New Zealand	4–0	China	The Hague, Netherlands
10:15	Punt 6', 60'; Whitelock 45'; Forgesson 63'	Report		Stadium: Kyocera Stadium

==== Four Nations (Dublin) ====
12 July 2014 Group Stage	Ireland	2–9	New Zealand	Dublin, Ireland
15:15	Frazer 33'; Sargent 40'	Report	Webster 9'; Punt 16', 26'; Flynn 18', 56'; Cocks 24'; Forgesson 28'; Merry 43', 55'	Stadium: University College Dublin

13 July 2014 Group Stage	New Zealand	10–0	Chile	Dublin, Ireland
13:00	Punt 18', 46'; Merry 24', 43'; Glynn 30', 32', 62'; Keddell 50'; Whitelock 54'; Flynn 70+'	Report		Stadium: University College Dublin

15 July 2014 Group Stage	New Zealand	7–0	Canada	Dublin, Ireland
17:00	Forgesson 9', 27'; Merry 41', 51'; Punt 64', 66', 69'	Report		Stadium: University College Dublin

16 July 2014 Final	New Zealand	3–0	Ireland	Dublin, Ireland
19:30	Forgesson 3', 22'; Cocks 63'	Report		Stadium: University College Dublin

==== XX Commonwealth Games ====
25 July 2014 Group Stage	New Zealand	14–0	Trinidad and Tobago	Glasgow, Scotland
19:00	Punt 3', 39'; Naylor 5'; Forgesson 5', 37', 49', 50'; Keddell 8'; Cocks 15'; Glynn 27', 42', 67'; Whitelock 35'; Webster 52'	Report		Stadium: Glasgow National Hockey Centre

27 July 2014 Group Stage	India	0–3	New Zealand	Glasgow, Scotland
16:00		Report	Flynn 3'; Punt 47', 53'	Stadium: Glasgow National Hockey Centre

28 July 2014 Group Stage	South Africa	1–2	New Zealand	Glasgow, Scotland
21:00	Bright 33'	Report	Punt 12'; Forgesson 51'	Stadium: Glasgow National Hockey Centre

30 July 2014 Group Stage	New Zealand	6–0	Canada	Glasgow, Scotland
14:00	Punt 1', 60'; Webster 16'; Forgesson 23', 48'; Whitelock 41'	Report		Stadium: Glasgow National Hockey Centre

1 August 2014 Semi-Finals	New Zealand	1–1 (1–3 p)	England	Glasgow, Scotland
14:30	Glynn 68'	Report	Owsley 28'	Stadium: Glasgow National Hockey Centre
	Penalties
	Whitelock (penalty shoot-out scored); Punt (penalty shoot-out missed); Glynn (penalty shoot-out missed); Michelsen (penalty shoot-out missed)		Twigg (penalty shoot-out scored); Danson (penalty shoot-out scored); Gilbert (penalty shoot-out scored); Bray (penalty shoot-out missed)

2 August 2014 Bronze Medal Match	South Africa	2–5	New Zealand	Glasgow, Scotland
18:00	Cox 24'; Taylor 49'	Report	Punt 6'; Forgesson 27'; Grant 55', 68'; Flynn 63'	Stadium: Glasgow National Hockey Centre

==== United States Test Series ====
18 October 2014 Test Match	New Zealand	1–1	United States	Stratford, New Zealand
14:00	Cocks 13'	Report	Kasold 25'	Stadium: TET MultiSports Centre

19 October 2014 Test Match	New Zealand	2–1	United States	Stratford, New Zealand
14:00	Punt 18'; Cocks 49'	Report	González 21'	Stadium: TET MultiSports Centre

21 October 2014 Test Match	New Zealand	1–2	United States	Palmerston North, New Zealand
18:30	Punt 57'	Report	Selenski 1'; Sharkey 24'	Stadium: Hockey Manawatu Inc

23 October 2014 Test Match	New Zealand	0–2	United States	Palmerston North, New Zealand
18:30		Report	Reinprecht 13'; Van Sickle 50'	Stadium: Hockey Manawatu Inc

25 October 2014 Test Match	New Zealand	1–0	United States	Masterton, New Zealand
14:00	Punt 47'	Report		Stadium: Hockey Wairarapa

26 October 2014 Test Match	New Zealand	1–3	United States	Masterton, New Zealand
14:00	Flynn 18'	Report	Selenski 39'; Pfeiffer 41'; González 44'	Stadium: Hockey Wairarapa

==== Australia Test Series ====
15 November 2014 Test Match	New Zealand	2–2	Australia	Wellington, New Zealand
15:00	Hayward 5'; Cocks 32'	Report	McMahon 35', 58'	Stadium: National Hockey Centre

16 November 2014 Test Match	New Zealand	2–3	Australia	Wellington, New Zealand
15:00	Punt 33'; Webster 44'	Report	E. Smith 14', 60'; Slattery 33'	Stadium: National Hockey Centre

18 November 2014 Test Match	New Zealand	3–3	Australia	Wellington, New Zealand
19:00	Michelsen 3', 50'; Merry 18'	Report	Kenny 24'; Slattery 27'; Nelson 60'	Stadium: National Hockey Centre

==== Argentina Test Series ====
23 November 2014 Test Match	Argentina	2–1	New Zealand	San Luis, Argentina
20:30	Luchetti 24'; Merino 51'	Report	Punt 57'	Stadium: Club San Luis

24 November 2014 Test Match	Argentina	3–0	New Zealand	San Luis, Argentina
20:30	Romang 6', 51'; Cavallero 26'	Report		Stadium: Club San Luis

==== XXI FIH Champions Trophy ====
29 November 2014 Group Stage	New Zealand	2–1	Japan	Mendoza, Argentina
14:00	Merry 46'; Gunson 51'	Report	Kato 49'	Stadium: Estadio Mendocino de Hockey

30 November 2014 Group Stage	New Zealand	1–1	Netherlands	Mendoza, Argentina
11:30	Merry 46'	Report	Van Maasakker 28'	Stadium: Estadio Mendocino de Hockey

2 December 2014 Group Stage	China	0–2	New Zealand	Mendoza, Argentina
18:00		Report	Punt 18', 24'	Stadium: Estadio Mendocino de Hockey

4 December 2014 Quarter-Finals	New Zealand	3–1	England	Mendoza, Argentina
18:00	Keddell 11'; Punt 23'; Michelsen 50'	Report	Unsworth 13'	Stadium: Estadio Mendocino de Hockey

6 December 2014 Semi-Finals	New Zealand	1–1 (0–3 p)	Australia	Mendoza, Argentina
16:30	Punt 2'	Report	Spence 40'	Stadium: Estadio Mendocino de Hockey
	Penalties
	Michelsen (penalty shoot-out missed); Punt (penalty shoot-out missed); Gunson (penalty shoot-out missed)		(penalty shoot-out scored) Nanscawen; (penalty shoot-out missed) Eastham; (penalty shoot-out scored) McMahon; (penalty shoot-out scored) E. Smith

7 December 2014 Bronze Medal Match	New Zealand	1–2	Netherlands	Mendoza, Argentina
16:30	Cocks 29'	Report	De Waard 11'; Welten 16'	Stadium: Estadio Mendocino de Hockey

=== 2015 Results ===
Statistics	Pld	W	D	L	GF	GA	GD	Pts
New Zealand	35	21	4	10	120	54	+66	67

Source: FIH

==== Canada Test Series ====
5 February 2015 Test Match	New Zealand	4–1	Canada	Whangārei, New Zealand
18:30	Webster 6'; Pearce 26'; Merry 40'; Neal 60+'	Report	Johansen 20'	Stadium: Northland Hockey Association

7 February 2015 Test Match	New Zealand	4–0	Canada	Whangārei, New Zealand
15:00	Webster 2', 11'; Neal 9'; Michelsen 20'	Report		Stadium: Northland Hockey Association

8 February 2015 Test Match	New Zealand	5–1	Canada	Whangārei, New Zealand
15:00	Punt 2', 48', 50', 60+'; McCann 44'	Report	Stairs 33'	Stadium: Northland Hockey Association

==== South Korea Test Match ====
4 April 2015 Test Match	New Zealand	3–2	South Korea	Auckland, New Zealand
15:00	Webster 11'; Merry 24'; Gloyn 45'	Report	Kim J. 4'; Baek 7'	Stadium: Lloyd Elsmore Hockey Stadium

==== Japan Test Match ====
5 April 2015 Test Match	New Zealand	0–1	Japan	Auckland, New Zealand
15:00		Report	Kato 33'	Stadium: Lloyd Elsmore Hockey Stadium

==== Argentina Test Series ====
7 April 2015 Test Match	New Zealand	1–0	Argentina	Gisborne, New Zealand
15:30	Merry 47'	Report		Stadium: Poverty Bay Hockey

8 April 2015 Test Match	New Zealand	1–7	Argentina	Gisborne, New Zealand
15:30	Pearce 7'	Report	Rebecchi 6', 11', 45', 46'; Merino 35'; Cavallero 44'; Juárez 57'	Stadium: Poverty Bay Hockey

==== II Hawke's Bay Cup ====
11 April 2015 Group Stage	New Zealand	2–2	Japan	Hastings, New Zealand
19:30	McCann 50'; Hayward 58'	Report	Oikawa 24'; Nagai 32'	Stadium: Hawke's Bay Sports Park

12 April 2015 Group Stage	New Zealand	3–2	Argentina	Hastings, New Zealand
17:30	Pearce 14'; Punt 23'; Merry 30'	Report	A. Habif 7'; Merino 38'	Stadium: Hawke's Bay Sports Park

14 April 2015 Group Stage	South Korea	1–2	New Zealand	Hastings, New Zealand
17:30	Cheon E. 55'	Report	Merry 17'; Flynn 49'	Stadium: Hawke's Bay Sports Park

16 April 2015 Quarter-Finals	New Zealand	4–1	India	Hastings, New Zealand
18:00	Webster 7'; Merry 28', 39'; Gunson 55'	Report	Rani 6'	Stadium: Hawke's Bay Sports Park

18 April 2015 Semi-Finals	New Zealand	4–0	South Korea	Hastings, New Zealand
16:30	Merry 12'; Flynn 13'; Webster 39', 50'	Report		Stadium: Hawke's Bay Sports Park

19 April 2015 Final	Australia	3–2	New Zealand	Hastings, New Zealand
18:45	Smith 40'; Peris 43'; Kenny 60'	Report	Flynn 1'; Merry 44'	Stadium: Hawke's Bay Sports Park

==== Netherlands Test Series ====
11 June 2015 Test Match	Netherlands	3–1	New Zealand	Amsterdam, Netherlands
18:30	Zerbo 19'; Jonker 35'; De Waard 49'	Report	Neal 56'	Stadium: Wagener Hockey Stadium

13 June 2015 Test Match	Netherlands	2–0	New Zealand	Amsterdam, Netherlands
14:00	Zerbo 28'; Dirkse van den Heuvel 44'	Report		Stadium: Wagener Hockey Stadium

==== II FIH World League Semi-Finals ====
20 June 2015 Group Stage	New Zealand	12–0	Poland	Antwerp, Belgium
10:00	Punt 8', 34'; Flynn 13', 15', 32', 47'; Keddell 15'; Merry 19', 48'; Webster 37'; Pearce 42'; Thompson 55'	Report		Stadium: KHC Dragons

23 June 2015 Group Stage	New Zealand	5–0	India	Antwerp, Belgium
14:00	Flynn 10', 40'; Merry 18'; Pearce 52', 56'	Report		Stadium: KHC Dragons

25 June 2015 Group Stage	Australia	0–2	New Zealand	Antwerp, Belgium
20:00		Report	Punt 33'; Gunson 54'	Stadium: KHC Dragons

27 June 2015 Group Stage	Belgium	0–2	New Zealand	Antwerp, Belgium
16:00		Report	Punt 12'; Flynn 33'	Stadium: KHC Dragons

30 June 2015 Quarter-Finals	New Zealand	5–1	Japan	Antwerp, Belgium
15:30	Webster 5'; Cocks 34'; Punt 42'; Pearce 49'; Flynn 54'	Report	Kato 4'	Stadium: KHC Dragons

2 July 2015 Semi-Finals	South Korea	1–1 (4–2 p)	New Zealand	Antwerp, Belgium
20:30	Park M. 25'	Report	Flynn 27'	Stadium: KHC Dragons
	Penalties
	Park M. (penalty shoot-out scored); Han (penalty shoot-out scored); Cheon (penalty shoot-out missed); Park S. (penalty shoot-out scored); Kim D. (penalty shoot-out scored)		(penalty shoot-out missed) King; (penalty shoot-out scored) Gunson; (penalty shoot-out scored) Charlton; (penalty shoot-out missed) Michelsen

4 July 2015 Third Place Match	Australia	4–2	New Zealand	Antwerp, Belgium
15:30	Smith 3'; Claxton 4'; Williams 15'; Nanscawen 45'	Report	Michelsen 34'; Punt 48'	Stadium: KHC Dragons

==== Argentina Test Series ====
3 October 2015 Test Match	New Zealand	1–2	Argentina	Blenheim, New Zealand
14:00	Gloyn 56'	Report	Zuloaga 8'; Granatto 35'	Stadium: Hockey Marlborough Inc

4 October 2015 Test Match	New Zealand	3–2	Argentina	Blenheim, New Zealand
14:00	Pearce 6'; Flynn 33'; Merry 56'	Report	Granatto 14'; Barrionuevo 18'	Stadium: Hockey Marlborough Inc

6 October 2015 Test Match	New Zealand	4–1	Argentina	Nelson, New Zealand
17:00	Flynn 10', 59'; FitzSimons 20'; Merry 54'	Report	Cavallero 33'	Stadium: Nelson Hockey Association

9 October 2015 Test Match	New Zealand	1–2	Argentina	Christchurch, New Zealand
18:00	Henry 50'	Report	Barrionuevo 28'; Gomes 57'	Stadium: Canterbury Hockey Club

==== IX Oceania Cup ====
21 October 2015 Group Stage	Samoa	0–31	New Zealand	Stratford, New Zealand
13:30		Report	Punt 2', 9', 43', 55'; Harrison 2', 8', 28', 33', 55'; Webster 14', 15', 20'; Cocks 14', 15'; Hayward 17', 39', 44'; Pearce 19', 24', 30', 34', 40', 42'; Neal 20'; Gunson 20'; Thompson 41', 51', 57', 59'; Merry 42', 47'	Stadium: TET MultiSports Centre

24 October 2015 Group Stage	New Zealand	2–2	Australia	Stratford, New Zealand
13:45	Pearce 17'; Merry 39'	Report	Slattery 14'; Kenny 56'	Stadium: TET MultiSports Centre

25 October 2015 Gold Medal Match	New Zealand	1–1 (1–2 p)	Australia	Stratford, New Zealand
13:45	Webster 9'	Report	Barden 23'	Stadium: TET MultiSports Centre
	Penalties
	Michelsen (penalty shoot-out missed); Gunson (penalty shoot-out missed); Charlton (penalty shoot-out missed); Harrison (penalty shoot-out scored); Merry (penalty shoot-out missed)		(penalty shoot-out missed) Smith; (penalty shoot-out missed) McMahon; (penalty shoot-out scored) Kenny; (penalty shoot-out scored) Williams

==== II FIH World League Final ====
5 December 2015 Group Stage	New Zealand	3–1	South Korea	Rosario, Argentina
14:15	Hayward 4'; Pearce 37'; Flynn 48'	Report	Seo 58'	Stadium: Estadio Mundialista de Hockey

6 December 2015 Group Stage	New Zealand	1–4	Netherlands	Rosario, Argentina
16:30	Webster 17'	Report	Van Maasakker 3'; Jonker 29'; Hoog 35'; Leurink 41'	Stadium: Estadio Mundialista de Hockey

9 December 2015 Group Stage	Germany	1–3	New Zealand	Rosario, Argentina
12:45	Hauke 45'	Report	Harrison 19'; Hayward 32'; Thompson 42'	Stadium: Estadio Mundialista de Hockey

10 December 2015 Quarter-Finals	New Zealand	2–1	Great Britain	Rosario, Argentina
16:00	Punt 22'; Merry 59'	Report	H. Richardson-Walsh 54'	Stadium: Estadio Mundialista de Hockey

12 December 2015 Semi-Finals	Germany	1–2	New Zealand	Rosario, Argentina
16:00	Hoffmann 36'	Report	Pearce 9'; Thompson 25'	Stadium: Estadio Mundialista de Hockey

13 December 2015 Gold Medal Match	Argentina	5–1	New Zealand	Rosario, Argentina
19:00	Granatto 16'; Campoy 29'; Dupuy 41'; Barrionuevo 44'; Merino 50'	Report	Punt 34'	Stadium: Estadio Mundialista de Hockey
