= 2013 Women's Four Nations Hockey Tournament (Whangārei) =

Four Nations
Tournament details
- Host country: New Zealand
- City: Whangārei
- Teams: 4 (from 3 confederations)
- Venue(s): Northland Hockey Association

Final positions
- Champions: New Zealand (1st title)
- Runner-up: South Korea
- Third place: Argentina

Tournament statistics
- Matches played: 8
- Top scorer(s): (New Zealand) Sian Fremaux (4 goals)

The 2013 Women's Four Nations Hockey Tournament was the first of two women's field hockey tournaments, consisting of a series of test matches. It was held in Whangārei, New Zealand, from April 10 to 14, 2013, and featured four of the top nations in women's field hockey.

== Competition format ==
The tournament featured the national teams of Argentina, South Korea, the United States, and the hosts, New Zealand, competing in a round-robin format, with each team playing each other once. Three points were awarded for a win, one for a draw, and none for a loss.

Country	October 2011 FIH Ranking	Best World Cup finish	Best Olympic Games finish
Argentina	2	Champions (2002, 2010)	Runners-Up (2000, 2012)
New Zealand	3	Fourth Place (1986)	Fourth Place (2012)
South Korea	8	Third Place (1990)	Runners-Up (1988, 1996)
United States	10	Third place (1994)	Third place (1984)

== Officials ==
The following umpires were appointed by the International Hockey Federation to officiate the tournament:

- Amber Church (NZL)
- Irene Clelland (AUS)
- Suzi Sutton (USA)
- Aleesha Unka (NZL)
- Veronica Villafañe (ARG)
- Kim Yoon-Seon (KOR)

== Results ==
All times are local (New Zealand Standard Time).

=== Preliminary round ===
Pos	Team	Pld	W	D	L	GF	GA	GD	Pts	Qualification
1	New Zealand (H)	3	2	0	1	10	5	+5	6	Advanced to Final
2	South Korea	3	2	0	1	9	8	+1	6	Advanced to Final
3	Argentina	3	1	0	2	7	6	+1	3	
4	United States	3	1	0	2	2	9	−7	3	

Source: FIH
Rules for classification: 1) points; 2) goal difference; 3) goals scored; 4) head-to-head result.
(H) Hosts

==== Fixtures ====
10 April 2013
17:30

Argentina	3–0	United States
Juárez 16'; Merino 36'; Rodríguez 56'	Report

Umpires:
Irene Clelland (AUS)
Kim Yoon-Seon (KOR)

10 April 2013
19:30

New Zealand	3–4	South Korea
Harrison 41'; Fremaux 44'; Michelsen 62'	Report	Hong 14'; Park M. 36'; Kim D. 43', 54'

Umpires:
Suzi Sutton (USA)
Veronica Villafañe (ARG)

11 April 2013
17:30

South Korea	1–2	United States
Kim O. 29'	Report	Albini 1'; Parsley 64'

Umpires:
Aleesha Unka (NZL)
Veronica Villafañe (ARG)

11 April 2013
19:30

Argentina	1–2	New Zealand
Cavallero 25'	Report	Harrison 31'; Glynn 62'

Umpires:
Suzi Sutton (USA)
Irene Clelland (AUS)

13 April 2013
13:00

South Korea	4–3	Argentina
Kim D. 18'; Cheon S. 24'; Park M. 39'; Han 50'	Report	Merino 15'; D. Sruoga 64'; Barrionuevo 69'

Umpires:
Aleesha Unka (NZL)
Suzi Sutton (USA)

13 April 2013
15:00

New Zealand	5–0	United States
Fremaux 29'; Sharland 51'; Punt 59'; Forgesson 66'; Webster 68'	Report

Umpires:
Veronica Villafañe (ARG)
Kim Yoon-Seon (KOR)

=== Classification round ===
==== Third and fourth place ====
14 April 2013
13:00

Argentina	3–0	United States
Merino 9'; Juárez 16'; Maccari 19'	Report

Umpires:
Kim Yoon-Seon (KOR)
Aleesha Unka (NZL)

==== Final ====
14 April 2013
15:30

New Zealand	3–0	South Korea
Fremaux 28', 43'; Glynn 33'	Report

Umpires:
Irene Clelland (AUS)
Veronica Villafañe (ARG)

== Statistics ==
=== Final standings ===
Pos	Team	Pld	W	D	L	GF	GA	GD	Pts	Status
1st place, gold medalist(s)	New Zealand (H)	4	3	0	1	13	5	+8	9	Tournament Champion
2nd place, silver medalist(s)	South Korea	4	2	0	2	9	11	−2	6	
3rd place, bronze medalist(s)	Argentina	4	2	0	2	10	6	+4	6	
4	United States	4	1	0	3	2	12	−10	3	

Source: FIH
(H) Hosts

=== Goalscorers ===
There were 34 goals scored in 8 matches, for an average of 4.25 goals per match.

4 goals

- (New Zealand) Sian Fremaux

3 goals

- (Argentina) Delfina Merino
- (South Korea) Kim Da-Rae

2 goals

- (Argentina) Giselle Juárez
- (New Zealand) Katie Glynn
- (New Zealand) Charlotte Harrison
- (South Korea) Park Mi-Hyun

1 goal

- (Argentina) Noel Barrionuevo
- (Argentina) Martina Cavallero
- (Argentina) Sofía Maccari
- (Argentina) Macarena Rodríguez
- (Argentina) Daniela Sruoga
- (New Zealand) Krystal Forgesson
- (New Zealand) Stacey Michelsen
- (New Zealand) Anita Punt
- (New Zealand) Kayla Sharland
- (New Zealand) Petrea Webster
- (South Korea) Han Hye-Lyoung
- (South Korea) Kim Ok-Ju
- (South Korea) Cheon Seul-Ki
- (South Korea) Hong Yoo-Jin
- (United States) Torrie Albini
- (United States) Lara Parsley

Source: FIH
