= 2012 Women's Four Nations Hockey Tournament (Córdoba) =

Four Nations
Tournament details
- Host country: Argentina
- City: Córdoba
- Teams: 4 (from 4 confederations)
- Venue: Soledad García Stadium

Final positions
- Champions: South Korea (1st title)
- Runner-up: Great Britain
- Third place: Argentina

Tournament statistics
- Matches played: 8
- Goals scored: 44 (5.5 per match)
- Top scorer: (Argentina) Noel Barrionuevo (5 goals)
- Best player: (South Korea) Park Mi-Hyun

The 2012 Women's Four Nations Hockey Tournament was a women's field hockey tournament, consisting of a series of test matches. It was held in Córdoba, Argentina, from January 18 to 22, 2012, and featured four of the top nations in women's field hockey.

== Competition format ==
The tournament featured the national teams of Great Britain, New Zealand, South Korea, and the hosts, Argentina, competing in a round-robin format, with each team playing each other once. Three points were awarded for a win, one for a draw, and none for a loss.

Country	October 2011 FIH Ranking	Best World Cup finish	Best Olympic Games finish
Argentina	2	Champions (2002, 2010)	Runners-Up (2000)
Great Britain	4	Third Place (2010)	Third Place (1992)
New Zealand	6	Fourth Place (1986)	Sixth Place (1984, 2000, 2004)
South Korea	8	Third place (1990)	Runners-Up (1988, 1996)

== Officials ==
The following umpires were appointed by the International Hockey Federation to officiate the tournament:

- Amy Hassick (USA)
- Kang Hyun-Hee (KOR)
- Aleesha Unka (NZL)
- Mariana Reydo (ARG)
- Sarah Wilson (GBR)

== Results ==
All times are local (Argentina Standard Time).

=== Preliminary round ===
Pos	Team	Pld	W	D	L	GF	GA	GD	Pts	Qualification
1	Great Britain	3	3	0	0	7	1	+6	9	Advanced to Final
2	South Korea	3	2	0	1	12	8	+4	6	Advanced to Final
3	Argentina (H)	3	1	0	2	8	10	−2	3	
4	New Zealand	3	0	0	3	7	15	−8	0	

Source: Hockey Mundial
Rules for classification: 1) points; 2) goal difference; 3) goals scored; 4) head-to-head result.
(H) Hosts

=== Fixtures ===
18 January 2012
19:30

Great Britain	3–1	South Korea
Cullen 13'; Herbert 41'; Danson 54'	Report	Cho E. 3'

Umpires:
Aleesha Unka (NZL)
Amy Hassick (USA)

18 January 2012
22:00

Argentina	7–3	New Zealand
Maccari 5'; Merino 15'; Barrionuevo 40', 48', 52', 69'; Rebecchi 70'	Report	Forgesson 2'; Finlayson 17', 44'

Umpires:
Kang Hyun-Hee (KOR)
Sarah Wilson (GBR)

19 January 2012
19:30

New Zealand	4–6	South Korea
Flynn 10'; Charlton 15'; Punt 27'; C. Harrison 56'	Report	Park M. 22'; Kim Jong-E. 25'; Lee S. 33', 70'; Hong 51'; Han 54'

Umpires:
Sarah Wilson (GBR)
Mariana Reydo (ARG)

19 January 2012
22:00

Great Britain	2–0	Argentina
Williams 21'; Cullen 49'	Report

Umpires:
Amy Hassick (USA)
Kang Hyun-Hee (KOR)

21 January 2012
17:00

New Zealand	0–2	Great Britain
	Report	Walsh 11'; Danson 20'

Umpires:
Mariana Reydo (ARG)
Kang Hyun-Hee (KOR)

21 January 2012
19:30

Argentina	1–5	South Korea
Barrionuevo 55'	Report	Lee S. 10', 58'; Park M. 27', 53'; Cho E. 44'

Umpires:
Amy Hassick (USA)
Aleesha Unka (NZL)

=== Classification round ===
==== Third and fourth place ====
22 January 2012
17:00

Argentina	3–2 (a.e.t.)	New Zealand
Merino 28'; Maccari 56'; D'Elía 80'	Report	King 21'; Punt 47'

Umpires:
Sarah Wilson (GBR)
Amy Hassick (USA)

==== Final ====
22 January 2012
19:30

Great Britain	2–3	South Korea
Cullen 9'; Ball 61'	Report	Park M. 11'; Kim Jong-E. 31', 45'

Umpires:
Aleesha Unka (NZL)
Mariana Reydo (ARG)

== Awards ==
The following awards were presented at the conclusion of the tournament:

Player of the Tournament	Top Goalscorer	Goalkeeper of the Tournament	Fair Play
(South Korea) Park Mi-Hyun	(Argentina) Noel Barrionuevo	(United Kingdom) Elizabeth Storry	Argentina

== Statistics ==
=== Final standings ===
Pos	Team	Pld	W	D	L	GF	GA	GD	Pts	Status
1st place, gold medalist(s)	South Korea	4	3	0	1	15	10	+5	9	Tournament Champion
2nd place, silver medalist(s)	Great Britain	4	3	0	1	9	4	+5	9	
3rd place, bronze medalist(s)	Argentina (H)	4	2	0	2	11	12	−1	6	
4	New Zealand	4	0	0	4	9	18	−9	0	

Source: Hockey Mundial
(H) Hosts

=== Goalscorers ===
There were 44 goals scored in 8 matches, for an average of 5.5 goals per match.

5 goals

- (Argentina) Noel Barrionuevo

4 goals

- (South Korea) Park Mi-Hyun
- (South Korea) Lee Seon-Ok

3 goals

- (United Kingdom) Crista Cullen
- (South Korea) Kim Jong-Eun

2 goals

- (Argentina) Sofía Maccari
- (Argentina) Delfina Merino
- (United Kingdom) Alexandra Danson
- (New Zealand) Cathryn Finlayson
- (New Zealand) Anita Punt
- (South Korea) Cho Eun-Ji

1 goal

- (Argentina) Silvina D'Elía
- (Argentina) Carla Rebecchi
- (United Kingdom) Ashleigh Ball
- (United Kingdom) Rebecca Herbert
- (United Kingdom) Kate Walsh
- (United Kingdom) Kerry Williams
- (New Zealand) Samantha Charlton
- (New Zealand) Gemma Flynn
- (New Zealand) Krystal Forgesson
- (New Zealand) Charlotte Harrison
- (New Zealand) Julia King
- (South Korea) Han Hye-Lyoung
- (South Korea) Hong Yoo-Jin
