= 2014 Women's Four Nations Hockey Tournament (Dublin) =

Four Nations
Tournament details
- Host country: Ireland
- City: Dublin
- Teams: 4 (from 3 confederations)
- Venue(s): University College Dublin

Final positions
- Champions: New Zealand (1st title)
- Runner-up: Ireland
- Third place: Chile

Tournament statistics
- Matches played: 8
- Goals scored: 42 (5.25 per match)
- Top scorer(s): (New Zealand) Anita Punt (7 goals)

The 2014 Women's Four Nations Hockey Tournament was a women's field hockey tournament, consisting of a series of test matches. It was held in Dublin, Ireland, from July 12 to 16, 2014, and featured four of the top nations in women's field hockey.

== Competition format ==
The tournament featured the national teams of Canada, Chile, New Zealand, and the hosts, Ireland, competing in a round-robin format, with each team playing each other once. Three points will be awarded for a win, one for a draw, and none for a loss.

Country	October 2011 FIH Ranking	Best World Cup finish	Best Olympic Games finish
Canada	22	Third Place (1986)	Fifth Place (1984)
Chile	20	Never Qualified	
Ireland	13	Eleventh Place (1994)	Never Qualified
New Zealand	4	Fourth Place (1986)	Fourth place (2012)

== Officials ==
The following umpires were appointed by the International Hockey Federation to officiate the tournament:

- Fanneke Alkemade (NED)
- Joanne Cumming (NZL)
- Alison Keogh (IRE)
- Megan Robertson (SCO)
- Sarah Wilson (CAN)

== Results ==
All times are local (Irish Standard Time).

=== Preliminary round ===
Pos	Team	Pld	W	D	L	GF	GA	GD	Pts	Qualification
1	New Zealand	3	3	0	0	26	2	+24	9	Advanced to Final
2	Ireland (H)	3	2	0	1	8	9	−1	6	Advanced to Final
3	Chile	3	1	0	2	2	11	−9	3	
4	Canada	3	0	0	3	0	14	−14	0	

Source: New Zealand Hockey Federation
Rules for classification: 1) points; 2) goal difference; 3) goals scored; 4) head-to-head result.
(H) Hosts

==== Fixtures ====
12 July 2014
13:00

Canada	0–2	Chile
	Report	Lagos 50'; García 64'

Umpires:
Alison Keogh (IRE)
Joanne Cumming (NZL)

12 July 2014
15:15

Ireland	2–9	New Zealand
Frazer 33'; Sargent 40'	Report	Webster 9'; Punt 16', 26'; Flynn 18', 56'; Cocks 24'; Forgesson 28'; Merry 43', 55'

Umpires:
Sarah Wilson (SCO)
Megan Robertson (CAN)

13 July 2014
13:00

New Zealand	10–0	Chile
Punt 18', 46'; Merry 24', 43'; Glynn 30', 32', 62'; Keddell 50'; Whitelock 54'; Flynn 70+'	Report

Umpires:
Fanneke Alkemade (NED)
Alison Keogh (IRE)

13 July 2014
15:15

Ireland	5–0	Canada
O'Flanagan 26'; Duke 54', 69'; Sargent 63'; Carroll 66'	Report

Umpires:
Sarah Wilson (SCO)
Joanne Cumming (NZL)

15 July 2014
17:00

New Zealand	7–0	Canada
Forgesson 9', 27'; Merry 41', 51'; Punt 64', 66', 69'	Report

Umpires:
Alison Keogh (IRE)
Sarah Wilson (SCO)

15 July 2014
19:30

Chile	0–1	Ireland
	Report	Speers 57'

Umpires:
Megan Robertson (CAN)
Fanneke Alkemade (NED)

=== Classification round ===
==== Third and fourth place ====
16 July 2014
17:00

Chile	3–0	Canada
Vidaurre 26'; Filipek 35+'; Villalabeitia 48'	Report

Umpires:
Joanne Cumming (NZL)
Fanneke Alkemade (NED)

==== Final ====
16 July 2014
19:30

New Zealand	3–0	Ireland
Forgesson 3', 22'; Cocks 63'	Report

Umpires:
Megan Robertson (CAN)
Sarah Wilson (SCO)

== Statistics ==
=== Final standings ===
Pos	Team	Pld	W	D	L	GF	GA	GD	Pts	Status
1st place, gold medalist(s)	New Zealand	4	4	0	0	29	2	+27	12	Tournament Champion
2nd place, silver medalist(s)	Ireland (H)	4	2	0	2	8	12	−4	6	
3rd place, bronze medalist(s)	Chile	4	2	0	2	5	11	−6	6	
4	Canada	4	0	0	4	0	17	−17	0	

Source: New Zealand Hockey Federation
(H) Hosts

=== Goalscorers ===
There were 42 goals scored in 8 matches, for an average of 5.25 goals per match.

7 goals

- (New Zealand) Anita Punt

6 goals

- (New Zealand) Olivia Merry

5 goals

- (New Zealand) Krystal Forgesson

3 goals

- (New Zealand) Gemma Flynn
- (New Zealand) Katie Glynn

2 goals

- (Ireland) Deirdre Duke
- (Ireland) Cliodhna Sargent
- (New Zealand) Sophie Cocks

1 goal

- (Chile) Sofía Filipek
- (Chile) Carolina García
- (Chile) Mariana Lagos
- (Chile) Francisca Vidaurre
- (Chile) Josefa Villalabeitia
- (Ireland) Naomi Carroll
- (Ireland) Megan Frazer
- (Ireland) Anna O'Flanagan
- (Ireland) Alexandra Speers
- (New Zealand) Rose Keddell
- (New Zealand) Petrea Webster
- (New Zealand) Kayla Whitelock
