= 2014–15 Women's FIH Hockey World League Final =

Field hockey tournament

Tournament details
- Host country: Argentina
- City: Rosario
- Dates: 5–13 December
- Teams: 8
- Venue: Estadio Mundialista Luciana Aymar

Final positions
- Champions: Argentina (1st title)
- Runner-up: New Zealand
- Third place: Germany

Tournament statistics
- Matches played: 22
- Goals scored: 79 (3.59 per match)
- Top scorer: (China) Wang Mengyu (5 goals)
- Best player: (New Zealand) Stacey Michelsen

The 2014–15 Women's FIH Hockey World League Final was the 2nd edition of the Finals of the FIH Hockey World League for women. It took place between 5–13 December 2015 in Rosario, Argentina. A total of eight teams competed for the title.

Argentina won the tournament for the first time after defeating New Zealand 5–1 in the final. Germany won the third place match by defeating China 6–2.

== Qualification ==
The host nation qualified automatically in addition to 7 teams qualified from the Semifinals. The following eight teams, shown with final pre-tournament rankings, competed in this round of the tournament.

Dates	Event	Location	Quotas	Qualifier(s)
	Host nation		1	Argentina (3)
10–21 June 2015	2014–15 FIH Hockey World League Semifinals	Valencia, Spain	7	Great Britain (6); China (5); Germany (9)
20 June–5 July 2015	2014–15 FIH Hockey World League Semifinals	Antwerp, Belgium	7	Netherlands (1); South Korea (8); Australia (2); New Zealand (4)
Total			8	

== Umpires ==
Below are the 10 umpires appointed by the International Hockey Federation:

- Frances Block (GBR)
- Maggie Giddens (USA)
- Soledad Iparraguirre (ARG)
- Michelle Joubert (RSA)
- Ayanna McClean (TRI)
- Michelle Meister (GER)
- Miao Lin (CHN)
- Irene Presenqui (ARG)
- Aleesha Unka (NZL)
- Emi Yamada (JPN)

== Results ==
All times are Argentina Time (UTC−03:00)

=== First round ===
==== Pool A ====
Pos	Team	Pld	W	D	L	GF	GA	GD	Pts
1	Netherlands	3	3	0	0	14	4	+10	9
2	New Zealand	3	2	0	1	7	6	+1	6
3	South Korea	3	0	1	2	4	9	−5	1
4	Germany	3	0	1	2	3	9	−6	1

Source: FIH
Rules for classification: 1) points; 2) goal difference; 3) goals scored; 4) head-to-head result.

5 December 2015
14:15

New Zealand	3–1	South Korea
Hayward 4'; Pearce 37'; Flynn 48'	Report	Seo 58'

Umpires:
Frances Block (GBR)
Maggie Giddens (USA)

5 December 2015
16:30

Netherlands	5–1	Germany
Krekelaar 16'; Welten 27'; Van Male 38'; Hoog 41'; De Goede 56'	Report	Haase 17'

Umpires:
Michelle Joubert (RSA)
Aleesha Unka (NZL)

6 December 2015
14:15

Germany	1–1	South Korea
Hauke 37'	Report	Han 45'

Umpires:
Ayanna McClean (TRI)
Irene Presenqui (ARG)

6 December 2015
16:30

New Zealand	1–4	Netherlands
Webster 17'	Report	Van Maasakker 3'; Jonker 29'; Hoog 35'; Leurink 41'

Umpires:
Miao Lin (CHN)
Emi Yamada (JPN)

Matches were scheduled to be played on 8 December but were postponed due to heavy rain.

9 December 2015
10:30

Netherlands	5–2	South Korea
Welten 7'; Van Maasakker 17'; Hoog 27'; Jonker 41'; Keetels 49'	Report	Cheon 14'; Park S. 30'

Umpires:
Michelle Meister (GER)
Irene Presenqui (ARG)

9 December 2015
12:45

Germany	1–3	New Zealand
Hauke 45'	Report	Harrison 19'; Hayward 32'; Thompson 42'

Umpires:
Miao Lin (CHN)
Maggie Giddens (USA)

==== Pool B ====
Pos	Team	Pld	W	D	L	GF	GA	GD	Pts
1	Australia	3	2	0	1	3	2	+1	6
2	China	3	1	1	1	4	3	+1	4
3	Great Britain	3	1	1	1	3	3	0	4
4	Argentina	3	1	0	2	4	6	−2	3

Source: FIH
Rules for classification: 1) points; 2) goal difference; 3) goals scored; 4) head-to-head result.

5 December 2015
18:45

Australia	1–0	China
Morgan 43'	Report

Umpires:
Emi Yamada (JPN)
Soledad Iparraguirre (ARG)

5 December 2015
21:00

Argentina	2–1	Great Britain
Granatto 15'; A. Habif 41'	Report	Owsley 5'

Umpires:
Miao Lin (CHN)
Michelle Meister (GER)

6 December 2015
18:45

China	1–1	Great Britain
Wang 35'	Report	H. Richardson-Walsh 34'

Umpires:
Aleesha Unka (NZL)
Maggie Giddens (USA)

6 December 2015
21:00

Argentina	1–2	Australia
Merino 4'	Report	Kenny 53'; Morgan 60+'

Umpires:
Michelle Joubert (RSA)
Frances Block (GBR)

8 December 2015
14:15

Australia	0–1	Great Britain
	Report	H. Richardson-Walsh 26'

Umpires:
Soledad Iparraguirre (ARG)
Aleesha Unka (NZL)

8 December 2015
16:30

China	3–1	Argentina
Wang 22'; Zhao 39'; Yu 42'	Report	Barrionuevo 32'

Umpires:
Ayanna McClean (TRI)
Emi Yamada (JPN)

=== Second round ===
Quarter-finals
10 December 2015
Netherlands	0
Argentina	1
10 December 2015
China	3
South Korea	1
10 December 2015
Australia	2 (1)
Germany (p.s.o.)	2 (2)
10 December 2015
New Zealand	2
Great Britain	1

Semi-finals
12 December 2015
Argentina	1
China	0
12 December 2015
Germany	1
New Zealand	2

Final
13 December 2015
Argentina	5
New Zealand	1
Third place
13 December 2015
China	2
Germany	6

==== Quarterfinals ====
10 December 2015
13:30

China	3–1	South Korea
Wang 9'; Zhang X. 45'; Wu Q. 60'	Report	Cheon 5'

Umpires:
Frances Block (GBR)
Ayanna McClean (TRI)

10 December 2015
16:00

New Zealand	2–1	Great Britain
Punt 22'; Merry 59'	Report	H. Richardson-Walsh 54'

Umpires:
Soledad Iparraguirre (ARG)
Michelle Meister (GER)

10 December 2015
18:30

Australia	2–2	Germany
Nanscawen 22'; Slattery 25'	Report	Altenburg 44', 60'
Penalties
Blyth (penalty shoot-out scored); Nanscawen (penalty shoot-out missed); Dwyer (penalty shoot-out missed); Williams (penalty shoot-out missed); Kenny (penalty shoot-out missed)	1–2	(penalty shoot-out scored) Müller; (penalty shoot-out missed) Mävers; (penalty shoot-out scored) Altenburg; (penalty shoot-out missed) Teschke

Umpires:
Irene Presenqui (ARG)
Emi Yamada (JPN)

10 December 2015
21:00

Netherlands	0–1	Argentina
	Report	Merino 4'

Umpires:
Michelle Joubert (RSA)
Miao Lin (CHN)

==== Fifth to eighth place classification ====
The losing quarterfinalists are ranked according to their first round results to determine the fixtures for the fifth to eighth place classification matches.

Pos	Team	Pld	W	D	L	GF	GA	GD	Pts
1	Netherlands	3	3	0	0	14	4	+10	9
2	Australia	3	2	0	1	3	2	+1	6
3	Great Britain	3	1	1	1	3	3	0	4
4	South Korea	3	0	1	2	4	9	−5	1

Rules for classification: 1) points; 2) goal difference; 3) goals scored.

===== Seventh place game =====
12 December 2015
11:30

Great Britain	5–1	South Korea
White 9', 48'; Watton 21'; Macleod 33'; H. Richardson-Walsh 58'	Report	Han 58'

Umpires:
Maggie Giddens (USA)
Ayanna McClean (TRI)

===== Fifth place game =====
12 December 2015
14:00

Netherlands	1–0	Australia
Welten 42'	Report

Umpires:
Frances Block (GBR)
Aleesha Unka (NZL)

==== First to fourth place classification ====
===== Semifinals =====
12 December 2015
16:30

Germany	1–2	New Zealand
Hoffmann 36'	Report	Pearce 9'; Thompson 25'

Umpires:
Soledad Iparraguirre (ARG)
Irene Presenqui (ARG)

12 December 2015
19:00

Argentina	1–0	China
Campoy 7'	Report

Umpires:
Michelle Joubert (RSA)
Michelle Meister (GER)

===== Third place game =====
13 December 2015
16:30

China	2–6	Germany
Wang 27', 38'	Report	Oldhafer 8'; Hoffmann 9'; Müller 13'; Müller-Wieland 15+'; Mävers 38'; Altenburg 42'

Umpires:
Irene Presenqui (ARG)
Soledad Iparraguirre (ARG)

===== Final =====
13 December 2015
19:00

Argentina	5–1	New Zealand
Granatto 16'; Campoy 29'; Dupuy 41'; Barrionuevo 44'; Merino 50'	Report	Punt 34'

Umpires:
Michelle Joubert (RSA)
Miao Lin (CHN)

== Awards ==
Player of the Tournament	Top Goalscorer	Young Player of the Tournament
(New Zealand) Stacey Michelsen	(China) Wang Mengyu	(Argentina) María José Granatto

== Statistics ==
=== Final standings ===
As per statistical convention in field hockey, matches decided in extra time are counted as wins and losses, while matches decided by penalty shoot-outs are counted as draws.

Pos	Team	Pld	W	D	L	GF	GA	GD	Pts	Final result
1st place, gold medalist(s)	Argentina	6	4	0	2	11	7	+4	12	Gold Medal
2nd place, silver medalist(s)	New Zealand	6	4	0	2	12	13	−1	12	Silver Medal
3rd place, bronze medalist(s)	Germany	6	1	2	3	12	15	−3	5	Bronze Medal
4	China	6	2	1	3	9	11	−2	7	Fourth place
5	Netherlands	5	4	0	1	15	5	+10	12	Eliminated in group stage
6	Australia	5	2	1	2	5	5	0	7	Eliminated in group stage
7	Great Britain	5	2	1	2	9	6	+3	7	Eliminated in group stage
8	South Korea	5	0	1	4	6	17	−11	1	Eliminated in group stage

Source: FIH

=== Goalscorers ===
There were 79 goals scored in 22 matches, for an average of 3.59 goals per match.

5 goals

- (China) Wang Mengyu

4 goals

- (United Kingdom) Helen Richardson-Walsh

3 goals

- (Argentina) Delfina Merino
- (Germany) Lisa Altenburg
- (Netherlands) Ellen Hoog
- (Netherlands) Lidewij Welten

2 goals

- (Argentina) Noel Barrionuevo
- (Argentina) Pilar Campoy
- (Argentina) María José Granatto
- (Australia) Georgina Morgan
- (Germany) Franzisca Hauke
- (Germany) Eileen Hoffmann
- (United Kingdom) Nicola White
- (Netherlands) Kelly Jonker
- (Netherlands) Caia van Maasakker
- (New Zealand) Pippa Hayward
- (New Zealand) Kirsten Pearce
- (New Zealand) Anita Punt
- (New Zealand) Elizabeth Thompson
- (South Korea) Cheon Eun-bi
- (South Korea) Han Hye-lyoung

1 goal

- (Argentina) Carla Dupuy
- (Argentina) Agustina Habif
- (Australia) Jodie Kenny
- (Australia) Georgia Nanscawen
- (Australia) Kathryn Slattery
- (China) Wu Qiong
- (China) Yu Qian
- (China) Zhang Xiaoxue
- (China) Zhao Yudiao
- (Germany) Lydia Haase
- (Germany) Julia Müller
- (Germany) Janne Müller-Wieland
- (Germany) Marie Mävers
- (Germany) Pia-Sophie Oldhafer
- (United Kingdom) Hannah MacLeod
- (United Kingdom) Lily Owsley
- (United Kingdom) Ellie Watton
- (Netherlands) Eva de Goede
- (Netherlands) Marloes Keetels
- (Netherlands) Maartje Krekelaar
- (Netherlands) Laurien Leurink
- (Netherlands) Kitty van Male
- (New Zealand) Gemma Flynn
- (New Zealand) Charlotte Harrison
- (New Zealand) Olivia Merry
- (New Zealand) Petrea Webster
- (South Korea) Park Seung-a
- (South Korea) Seo Jung-eun

Source: FIH
