= 2013 Women's Four Nations Hockey Tournament (Hamilton) =

Women's field hockey tournament

Four Nations
Tournament details
- Host country: New Zealand
- Teams: 4 (from 3 confederations)
- Venue(s): 2 (in 2 host cities)

Final positions
- Champions: Argentina (1st title)
- Runner-up: New Zealand
- Third place: United States

Tournament statistics
- Matches played: 8
- Goals scored: 31 (3.88 per match)
- Top scorer(s): (Argentina) Carla Rebecchi (5 goals)

The 2013 Women's Four Nations Hockey Tournament was the second of two women's field hockey tournaments, consisting of a series of test matches. It was held in Hamilton and Tauranga, New Zealand, from April 17 to 21, 2013, and featured four of the top nations in women's field hockey.

== Competition format ==
The tournament featured the national teams of Argentina, South Korea, the United States, and the hosts, New Zealand, competing in a round-robin format, with each team playing each other once. Three points were awarded for a win, one for a draw, and none for a loss.

Country	October 2011 FIH Ranking	Best World Cup finish	Best Olympic Games finish
Argentina	2	Champions (2002, 2010)	Runners-Up (2000, 2012)
New Zealand	3	Fourth Place (1986)	Fourth Place (2012)
South Korea	8	Third Place (1990)	Runners-Up (1988, 1996)
United States	10	Third place (1994)	Third place (1984)

== Officials ==
The following umpires were appointed by the International Hockey Federation to officiate the tournament:

- Karen Bennett (NZL)
- Amber Church (NZL)
- Irene Clelland (AUS)
- Suzi Sutton (USA)
- Veronica Villafañe (ARG)
- Kim Yoon-Seon (KOR)

== Results ==
All times are local (New Zealand Standard Time).

=== Preliminary round ===
Pos	Team	Pld	W	D	L	GF	GA	GD	Pts	Qualification
1	New Zealand (H)	3	2	1	0	8	3	+5	7	Advanced to Final
2	Argentina	3	1	2	0	7	5	+2	5	Advanced to Final
3	South Korea	3	1	0	2	7	10	−3	3	
4	United States	3	0	1	2	2	6	−4	1	

Source: FIH
Rules for classification: 1) points; 2) goal difference; 3) goals scored; 4) head-to-head result.
(H) Hosts

==== Fixtures ====
17 April 2013
17:00

South Korea	4–1	United States
An 17'; Park M. 30', 40'; Lee Y. 47'	Report	Crandall 52'

Gallagher Hockey Centre, Hamilton
Umpires:
Irene Clelland (AUS)
Amber Church (NZL)

17 April 2013
19:00

New Zealand	2–2	Argentina
Michelsen 55'; Harrison 70'	Report	Cavallero 11'; Rebecchi 41'

Gallagher Hockey Centre, Hamilton
Umpires:
Suzi Sutton (USA)
Kim Yoon-Seon (KOR)

18 April 2013
17:00

Argentina	4–2	South Korea
Rebecchi 5', 63'; Barrionuevo 28', 38'	Report	Kim Y. 49', 70'

Gallagher Hockey Centre, Hamilton
Umpires:
Amber Church (NZL)
Suzi Sutton (USA)

18 April 2013
19:00

New Zealand	1–0	United States
Curtis 17'	Report

Gallagher Hockey Centre, Hamilton
Umpires:
Kim Yoon-Seon (KOR)
Veronica Villafañe (ARG)

20 April 2013
13:00

Argentina	1–1	United States
Merino 32'	Report	Dawson 69'

Blake Park, Tauranga
Umpires:
Amber Church (NZL)
Kim Yoon-Seon (KOR)

20 April 2013
15:00

South Korea	1–5	New Zealand
Cheon S. 21'	Report	Glynn 32', 35', 38', 44'; Merry 65'

Blake Park, Tauranga
Umpires:
Veronica Villafañe (ARG)
Irene Clelland (AUS)

=== Classification round ===
==== Third and fourth place ====
21 April 2013
15:00

South Korea	0–1	United States
	Report	Pfeiffer 48'

Blake Park, Tauranga
Umpires:
Amber Church (NZL)
Veronica Villafañe (ARG)

==== Final ====
21 April 2013
17:00

New Zealand	1–5	Argentina
Reid 48'	Report	Merino 15'; Rebecchi 27', 35'; Aymar 28'; Juárez 50'

Blake Park, Tauranga
Umpires:
Suzi Sutton (USA)
Kim Yoon-Seon (KOR)

== Statistics ==
=== Final standings ===
Pos	Team	Pld	W	D	L	GF	GA	GD	Pts	Status
1st place, gold medalist(s)	Argentina	4	2	2	0	12	6	+6	8	Tournament Champion
2nd place, silver medalist(s)	New Zealand (H)	4	2	1	1	9	8	+1	7	
3rd place, bronze medalist(s)	United States	4	1	1	2	3	6	−3	4	
4	South Korea	4	1	0	3	7	11	−4	3	

Source: FIH
(H) Hosts

=== Goalscorers ===
There were 31 goals scored in 8 matches, for an average of 3.88 goals per match.

5 goals

- (Argentina) Carla Rebecchi

4 goals

- (New Zealand) Katie Glynn

2 goals

- (Argentina) Noel Barrionuevo
- (Argentina) Delfina Merino
- (South Korea) Park Mi-Hyun
- (South Korea) Kim Young-Ran

1 goal

- (Argentina) Luciana Aymar
- (Argentina) Martina Cavallero
- (Argentina) Giselle Juárez
- (New Zealand) Michaela Curtis
- (New Zealand) Charlotte Harrison
- (New Zealand) Olivia Merry
- (New Zealand) Stacey Michelsen
- (New Zealand) Cassandra Reid
- (South Korea) An Hyo-Ju
- (South Korea) Cheon Seul-Ki
- (South Korea) Lee Young-Sil
- (United States) Lauren Crandall
- (United States) Rachel Dawson
- (United States) Lauren Pfeiffer

Source: FIH
