= 2011 Women's Oceania Cup =

Field hockey tournament

2011 Oceania Cup
Tournament details
- Host country: Australia
- City: Hobart
- Dates: 6–9 October
- Teams: 2 (from 1 confederation)
- Venue: Tasmanian Hockey Centre

Final positions
- Champions: New Zealand (3rd title)
- Runner-up: Australia

Tournament statistics
- Matches played: 3
- Goals scored: 15 (5 per match)
- Top scorer: (Australia) Anna Flanagan (3 goals)

The 2011 Women's Oceania Cup was the seventh edition of the women's field hockey tournament. It was held from 6–9 October in Hobart.

The tournament served as a qualifier for the 2012 Summer Olympics.

New Zealand won the tournament for the third time, defeating Australia in the three–game series by goal difference, after the teams finished equal on points. Despite the Hockeyroos' second-place finish, the 2011 Oceania Cup held two qualifying allocations for the Olympic Games, meaning both teams qualified.

== Results ==
All times are local (AEDT).

=== Pool ===
Pos	Team	Pld	W	D	L	GF	GA	GD	Pts	Qualification
1	New Zealand	3	1	1	1	8	7	+1	4	2012 Summer Olympics
2	Australia	3	1	1	1	7	8	−1	4	2012 Summer Olympics

Source: Clearing House
Rules for classification: 1) points; 2) goal difference; 3) goals scored; 4) head-to-head result.

=== Fixtures ===
6 October 2011
19:30

Australia	2–1	New Zealand
Flanagan 25', 32'	Report	Glynn 4'

Umpires:
Miao Lin (CHN)
Irene Presenqui (ARG)

8 October 2011
13:00

Australia	3–3	New Zealand
Flanagan 21'; Eastham 56'; Smith 62'	Report	Naylor 7'; S. Harrison 8'; Punt 35'

Umpires:
Irene Presenqui (ARG)
Miao Lin (CHN)

9 October 2011
13:00

Australia	2–4	New Zealand
Schulz 14'; Messent 35'	Report	C. Harrison 7'; Sharland 20'; Eshuis 58'; Michelsen 62'

Umpires:
Miao Lin (CHN)
Irene Presenqui (ARG)

== Statistics ==
=== Final standings ===
1. New Zealand
2. Australia

=== Goalscorers ===
There were 15 goals scored in 3 matches, for an average of 5 goals per match.

3 goals

- (Australia) Anna Flanagan

1 goal

- (Australia) Casey Eastham
- (Australia) Claire Messent
- (Australia) Jodie Schulz
- (Australia) Emily Smith
- (New Zealand) Clarissa Eshuis
- (New Zealand) Katie Glynn
- (New Zealand) Charlotte Harrison
- (New Zealand) Samantha Harrison
- (New Zealand) Stacey Michelsen
- (New Zealand) Emily Naylor
- (New Zealand) Anita Punt
- (New Zealand) Kayla Sharland
