= Hockey at the 2014 Commonwealth Games – Women's tournament =

2014 Commonwealth Games–Women's hockey
Tournament details
- Host country: Scotland
- City: Glasgow
- Dates: 24 July – 2 August 2014
- Teams: 10
- Venue: Glasgow National Hockey Centre

Final positions
- Champions: Australia (4th title)
- Runner-up: England
- Third place: New Zealand

Tournament statistics
- Matches played: 27
- Goals scored: 143 (5.3 per match)
- Top scorer: (Australia) Jodie Kenny (10 goals)

The women's field hockey event at the 2014 Commonwealth Games was held at the Glasgow National Hockey Centre from 24 July to 2 August 2014.

== Results ==
=== Preliminary round ===
==== Pool A ====
Team	Pld	W	D	L	GF	GA	GD	Pts	Qualification
New Zealand	4	4	0	0	25	1	+24	12	Semi-finals
South Africa	4	3	0	1	22	4	+18	9	Semi-finals
India	4	2	0	2	20	8	+12	6	
Canada	4	1	0	3	6	13	−7	3	
Trinidad and Tobago	4	0	0	4	1	48	−47	0	

24 July 2014
14:00

South Africa	16–0	Trinidad and Tobago
Russell 8', 59'; Chamberlain 9', 30', 51', 55'; Damons 14', 41'; Evans 15', 36', 52'; Deetlefs 23'; Bright 34', 69'; Taylor 57', 64'	Report

Umpires:
Dino Willox (WAL)
Miskarmalia Ariffin (SIN)

24 July 2014
16:00

India	4–2	Canada
Rampal 22'; Rani 29'; J. Kaur 38', 53'	Report	Stairs 25'; Johansen 46'

Umpires:
Kylie Seymour (AUS)
Hannah Sanders (ENG)

25 July 2014
19:00

New Zealand	14–0	Trinidad and Tobago
Punt 3', 39'; Naylor 5'; Forgesson 5', 37', 49', 50'; Keddell 8'; Cocks 15'; Glynn 27', 42', 67'; Whitelock 35'; Webster 52'	Report

Umpires:
Alex Walker (SCO)
Wendy Stewart (CAN)

25 July 2014
21:00

South Africa	2–0	Canada
Chamberlain 52', 55'	Report

Umpires:
Sarah Wilson (SCO)
Ayana McClean (TRI)

27 July 2014
14:00

Canada	4–1	Trinidad and Tobago
Stewart 28'; Stairs 34'; Gillis 56'; Johansen 70'	Report	Govia 67'

Umpires:
Alex Walker (SCO)
Miskarmalia Ariffin (SIN)

27 July 2014
16:00

India	0–3	New Zealand
	Report	Flynn 3'; Punt 47', 53'

Umpires:
Kylie Seymour (AUS)
Nur Hafizah Azman (MAS)

28 July 2014
19:00

Trinidad and Tobago	0–14	India
	Report	Katariya 4'; Thakur 11', 27', 64'; Rampal 12', 19', 25'; Kaur 18', 41', 48'; Rani 22'; Thokchom 31'; Barla 53'; Arya 68'

Umpires:
Hannah Sanders (ENG)
Nor Hafizah Azman (MAS)

28 July 2014
21:00

South Africa	1–2	New Zealand
Bright 33'	Report	Punt 12'; Forgesson 51'

Umpires:
Kylie Seymour (AUS)
Dino Willox (WAL)

30 July 2014
14:00

New Zealand	6–0	Canada
Punt 1', 60'; Webster 16'; Forgesson 23', 48'; Whitelock 41'	Report

Umpires:
Nor Hafizah Azman (MAS)
Annelize Rostron (RSA)

30 July 2014
16:00

India	2–3	South Africa
Kaur 34'; Rampal 59'	Report	Bright 14'; Chamberlain 35'; Davids 54'

Umpires:
Hannah Sanders (ENG)
Dino Willox (WAL)

==== Pool B ====
Team	Pld	W	D	L	GF	GA	GD	Pts	Qualification
Australia	4	4	0	0	25	0	+25	12	Semi-finals
England	4	3	0	1	9	4	+5	9	Semi-finals
Scotland	4	2	0	2	5	11	−6	6	
Malaysia	4	0	1	3	0	11	−11	1	
Wales	4	0	1	3	0	13	−13	1	

24 July 2014
09:00

Australia	4–0	Malaysia
Kenny 7'; White 20'; Parker 30', 49'	Report

Umpires:
Sarah Wilson (SCO)
Wendy Stewart (CAN)

24 July 2014
11:00

England	2–0	Wales
Danson 29'; White 63'	Report

Umpires:
Aleesha Unka (NZL)
Ayana McClean (TRI)

25 July 2014
14:00

Australia	9–0	Wales
Kenny 12', 22', 26'; Parker 14', 45', 50'; Smith 25'; Peris 40'; Nanscawen 53'	Report

Umpires:
Annelize Rostron (RSA)
Nur Hafizah Azman (MAS)

25 July 2014
16:00

Scotland	2–0	Malaysia
Wyllie 26', 40'	Report

Umpires:
Aleesha Unka (NZL)
Miskarmalia Ariffin (SIN)

27 July 2014
09:00

Scotland	0–9	Australia
	Report	Kenny 3', 20', 47'; Nelson 19'; Flanagan 53', 60'; Nanscawen 55'; Smith 63'; Taylor 67'

Umpires:
Dino Willox (WAL)
Ayana McClean (TRI)

27 July 2014
11:00

England	5–0	Malaysia
Watton 17'; Ansley 35+'; Bray 42'; Danson 50'; Webb 70'	Report

Umpires:
Annelize Rostron (RSA)
Wendy Stewart (CAN)

28 July 2014
14:00

Australia	3–0	England
Kenny 12', 50'; Smith 13'	Report

Umpires:
Aleesha Unka (NZL)
Sarah Wilson (SCO)

28 July 2014
16:00

Wales	0–2	Scotland
	Report	Bell 9'; Clement 27'

Umpires:
Ayanna McClean (TTO)
Annelize Rostron (RSA)

30 July 2014
09:00

Scotland	1–2	England
Kidd 32'	Report	Danson 16'; Townsend 28'

Umpires:
Wendy Stewart (CAN)
Miskarmalia Ariffin (SIN)

30 July 2014
11:00

Malaysia	0–0	Wales
	Report

Umpires:
Kylie Seymour (AUS)
Alex Walker (SCO)

=== Fifth to tenth place classification ===
==== Ninth and tenth place ====
31 July 2014
19:00

Trinidad and Tobago	0–4	Wales
	Report	Barnes 43'; Batten 46', 68'; Richards 65'

Umpires:
Alex Walker (SCO)
Sarah Wilson (SCO)

==== Seventh and eighth place ====
31 July 2014
21:15

Canada	2–2	Malaysia
Stairs 15'; Gillis 55'	Report	Fatin 48'; Nabihah 66'
Penalties
Secco (penalty shoot-out missed); Raye (penalty shoot-out missed); Sandhu (penalty shoot-out missed)	0–3	(penalty shoot-out scored) Nuraini; (penalty shoot-out scored) Norbaini; (penalty shoot-out scored) Sumantri

Umpires:
Hannah Sanders (ENG)
Aleesha Unka (NZL)

==== Fifth and sixth place ====
1 August 2014
10:00

India	2–1	Scotland
Barla 53'; P. Rani 57'	Report	Kidd 55'

Umpires:
Miskarmalia Ariffin (SIN)
Ayana McClean (TTO)

=== Medal round ===
Semi-finals
1 August 2014
Australia	7
South Africa	1
1 August 2014
New Zealand	1 (1)
England (p.)	1 (3)

Gold medal match
2 August 2014
Australia (p.)	1 (3)
England	1 (1)
Bronze medal match
2 August 2014
South Africa	2
New Zealand	5

==== Semifinals ====
1 August 2014
12:15

Australia	7–1	South Africa
Smith 17'; White 21', 47'; Parker 49', 57'; Claxton 50'; Nanscawen 67'	Report	Evans 53'

Umpires:
Aleesha Unka (NZL)
Sarah Wilson (SCO)

1 August 2014
14:30

New Zealand	1–1	England
Glynn 68'	Report	Owsley 28'
Penalties
Whitelock (penalty shoot-out scored); Punt (penalty shoot-out missed); Glynn (penalty shoot-out missed); Michelsen (penalty shoot-out missed)	1–3	Twigg (penalty shoot-out scored); Danson (penalty shoot-out scored); Gilbert (penalty shoot-out scored); Bray (penalty shoot-out missed)

Umpires:
Annelize Rostron (RSA)
Kylie Seymour (AUS)

==== Bronze medal match ====
2 August 2014
18:00

South Africa	2–5	New Zealand (bronze)
Cox 24'; Taylor 49'	Report	Punt 6'; Forgesson 27'; Grant 55', 68'; Flynn 63'

Umpires:
Sarah Wilson(SCO)
Kylie Seymour (AUS)

==== Gold medal match ====
2 August 2014
20:15

(gold) Australia	1–1	England (silver)
Kenny 70'	Report	Owsley 48'
Penalties
Eastham (penalty shoot-out scored); White (penalty shoot-out missed); Parker (penalty shoot-out scored); Kenny (penalty shoot-out missed); Blyth (penalty shoot-out scored)	3–1	(penalty shoot-out scored) Twigg; (penalty shoot-out missed) Danson; (penalty shoot-out missed) Gilbert; (penalty shoot-out missed) White

Umpires:
Dino Willox (WAL)
Wendy Stewart (CAN)

== Statistics ==
=== Final rankings ===
As per statistical convention in field hockey, matches decided in extra time are counted as wins and losses, while matches decided by penalty shoot-outs are counted as draws.

Pos	Team	Pld	W	D	L	GF	GA	GD	Pts	Final result
1st place, gold medalist(s)	Australia	6	5	1	0	33	2	+31	16	Gold Medal
2nd place, silver medalist(s)	England	6	3	2	1	11	6	+5	11	Silver Medal
3rd place, bronze medalist(s)	New Zealand	6	5	1	0	31	4	+27	16	Bronze Medal
4	South Africa	6	3	0	3	25	16	+9	9	Fourth place
5	India	5	3	0	2	22	9	+13	9	Eliminated in group stage
6	Scotland	5	2	0	3	6	13	−7	6	Eliminated in group stage
7	Malaysia	5	0	2	3	2	13	−11	2	Eliminated in group stage
8	Canada	5	1	1	3	8	15	−7	4	Eliminated in group stage
9	Wales	5	1	1	3	4	13	−9	4	Eliminated in group stage
10	Trinidad and Tobago	5	0	0	5	1	52	−51	0	Eliminated in group stage

Source: FIH

=== Goalscorers ===
There were 143 goals scored in 27 matches, for an average of 5.3 goals per match.

10 goals

- (Australia) Jodie Kenny

8 goals

- (New Zealand) Krystal Forgesson
- (New Zealand) Anita Punt

7 goals

- (Australia) Georgina Parker
- (South Africa) Dirkie Chamberlain

6 goals

- (India) Jaspreet Kaur

5 goals

- (India) Rani Rampal

4 goals

- (Australia) Emily Smith
- (New Zealand) Katie Glynn
- (South Africa) Tarryn Bright
- (South Africa) Celia Evans

3 goals

- (Australia) Georgia Nanscawen
- (Australia) Kellie White
- (Canada) Brienne Stairs
- (England) Alex Danson
- (India) Poonam Rani
- (India) Deepika Thakur
- (South Africa) Kathleen Taylor

2 goals

- (Australia) Anna Flanagan
- (Canada) Katherine Gillis
- (Canada) Karli Johansen
- (England) Lily Owsley
- (India) Anupa Barla
- (New Zealand) Jordan Grant
- (New Zealand) Gemma Flynn
- (New Zealand) Petrea Webster
- (New Zealand) Kayla Whitelock
- (Scotland) Nikki Kidd
- (Scotland) Ailsa Wyllie
- (South Africa) Sulette Damons
- (South Africa) Shelley Russell
- (Wales) Emma Batten

1 goal

- (Australia) Jane Claxton
- (Australia) Ashleigh Nelson
- (Australia) Brooke Peris
- (Australia) Jayde Taylor
- (Canada) Holly Stewart
- (England) Giselle Ansley
- (England) Sophie Bray
- (England) Susannah Townsend
- (England) Eleanor Watton
- (England) Hollie Webb
- (England) Nicola White
- (India) Ritushi Arya
- (India) Anuradha Thokchom
- (India) Vandana Katariya
- (Malaysia) Fatin Sukri
- (Malaysia) Nabihah Mansur
- (New Zealand) Sophie Cocks
- (New Zealand) Rose Keddell
- (New Zealand) Emily Naylor
- (Scotland) Alison Bell
- (Scotland) Linda Clement
- (South Africa) Marsha Cox
- (South Africa) Illse Davids
- (South Africa) Lisa-Marie Deetlefs
- (Trinidad and Tobago) Brianna Govia
- (Wales) Elen Barnes
- (Wales) Phoebe Richards

Source: FIH
