= Estadio Mundialista Luciana Aymar =

Field hockey stadium in Rosario, Argentina

Luciana Aymar Hockey Stadium
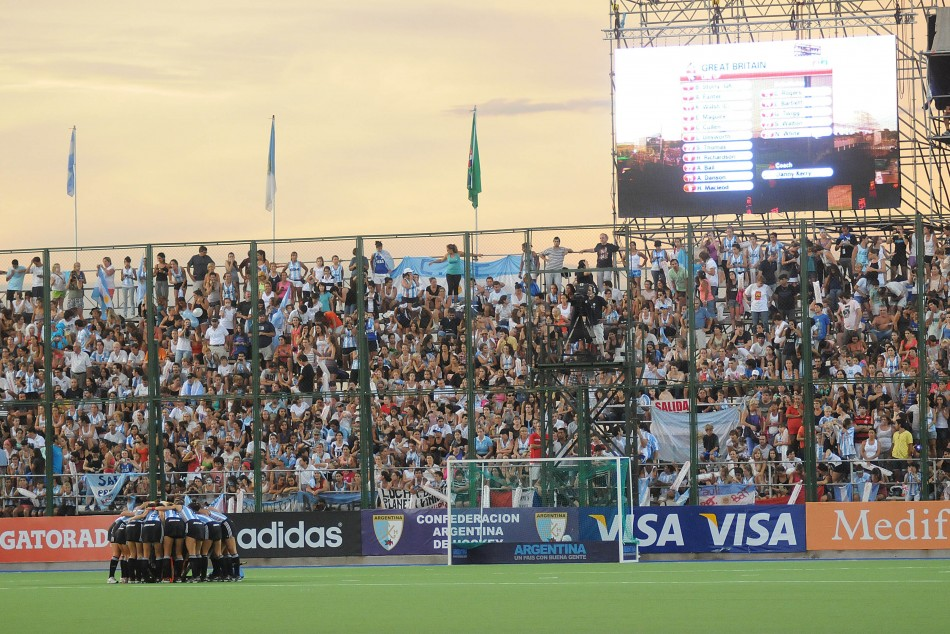
- Interactive map of Luciana Aymar Hockey Stadium
- Full name: Estadio Mundialista de Hockey "Luciana Aymar"
- Former names: Estadio Mundialista (2010–15)
- Address: Avenida Calasanz and Miglerini; Rosario; Argentina
- Coordinates: 32.939261°S 60.760847°W
- Owner: Municipality of Rosario
- Capacity: 6,200 (2012-present); 12,000 (2010–12)
- Surface: Grass
- Field size: 91,4 x 55 m

Construction
- Opened: 2010; 16 years ago

Estadio Mundialista Luciana Aymar is a field hockey stadium in Rosario, Argentina. It was specifically built to host the 2010 Women's Hockey World Cup, with a capacity of 12,000 with mobile grandstands. The stadium changed its name in 2015 to honor Luciana Aymar, widely regarded as the best Argentine female hockey player ever.

After it was announced the stadium would be the venue for the 2012 Women's Hockey Champions Trophy, a permanent grandstand was built on one of the sides of the pitch with 1,400 seats plus the mobile grandstands as previously erected for the World Cup for a total capacity of 6,200.

This stadium was chosen one more time to host the Final of the 2014–15 FIH Hockey World League. Before the final match started, it was officially confirmed by the municipal authorities the name change in honor of Aymar with the unveiling of a plaque.

== International events ==
- 2010 Women's Hockey World Cup
- 2012 Women's Hockey Champions Trophy
- 2014–15 Women's FIH Hockey World League Final
- 3 matches of 2019 Women's FIH Pro League's round-robin (against China, Great Britain and New Zealand)
- 3 matches of 2019 Men's FIH Pro League's round-robin (against Spain, Great Britain and New Zealand)
