= Jordan Grant =

Jordan Grant may refer to:

- Jordan Grant (field hockey) (born 1991), New Zealand field hockey player
- Jordan Grant (rugby league) (born 1994), Australian rugby league footballer

== See also ==
- Adam Roarke (1937–1996), American actor sometimes credited as Jordan Grant
