= Cathryn Finlayson =

New Zealand field hockey player

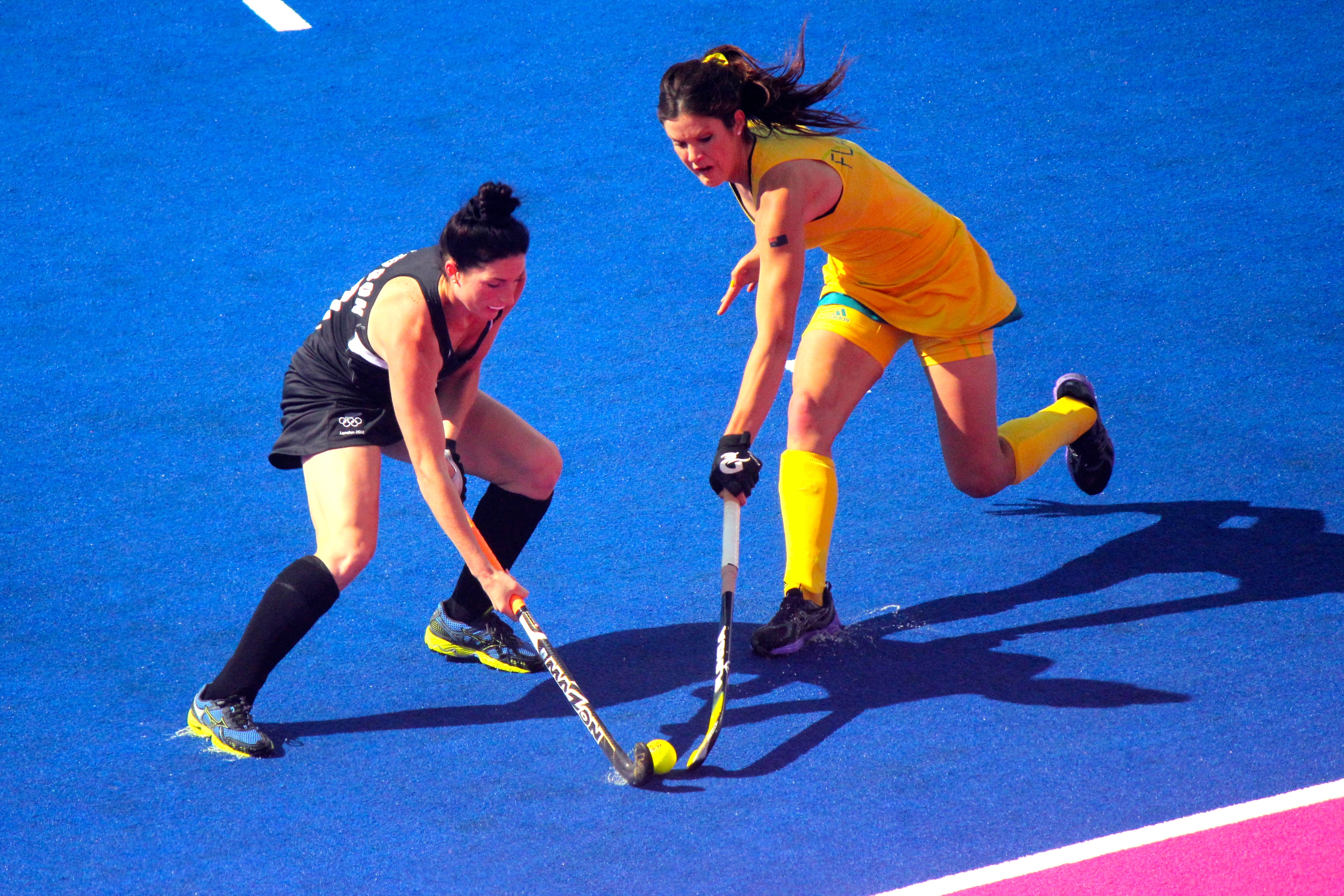
- Finlayson (left) at the 2012 Summer Olympics

Personal information
- Born: 24 September 1988 (age 37) Palmerston North, New Zealand
- Height: 1.63 m (5 ft 4 in)

Sport
- Sport: Field hockey
- Position: Forward
National team
Years	Team	Caps	Goals
2011–present	New Zealand	65	(18)
Medal record
Women's field hockey
Representing New Zealand
Champions Trophy
Bronze medal – third place	2011 Amstelveen	Team
- Updated on 16 August 2012 (national)

Cathryn (Cat) Finlayson (born 24 August 1988) is a New Zealand field hockey player. She has competed for the New Zealand women's national field hockey team (the Black Sticks Women) since 2010, including for the team at the 2012 Summer Olympics.
