= Sofía Maccari =

Argentine field hockey player (born 1984)

Personal information
- Born: July 3, 1984 (age 42) Buenos Aires, Argentina
- Height: 1.65 m (5 ft 5 in)

Sport
- Sport: Field hockey
- Position: Forward
- Club: San Fernando
Senior career
Years	Team	Caps	Goals
???–2002	San Fernando	-	-
2002–2009	Atlètic Terrassa	-	-
2009–	San Fernando	-	-
National team
Years	Team	Caps	Goals
2009–2013, 2020	Argentina	51	-
Medal record
Women's Field hockey
Representing Argentina
Summer Olympics
Silver medal – second place	2012 London	Team
Silver medal – second place	2020 Tokyo	Team
Champions Trophy
Gold medal – first place	2012 Rosario	Team
Silver medal – second place	2011 Amstelveen	Team
Pan American Games
Silver medal – second place	2011 Guadalajara	Team
- Updated on October 3, 2012

Sofía Maccari is an Argentine field hockey player. At the 2012 Summer Olympics, she competed for the Argentina women's national field hockey team in the women's event and won the silver medal. Sofía has also won the Champions Trophy in 2012 and the silver medal at the 2011 Pan American Games

== Hockey career ==
Maccari was called out to join the national team by Carlos Retegui in 2010. Since then, she played every major tournament until her dismissal in 2013 by Emanuel Roggero due to squad issues. In October 2020, with Retegui back as a head coach, Maccari was called back to the national team after 7 years out.
