= Martina Cavallero =

Argentine field hockey player

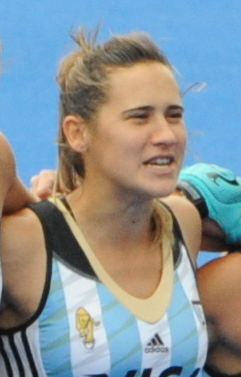
- Cavallero in 2016

Personal information
- Born: 7 May 1990 (age 36) Morón, Argentina
- Height: 1.63 m (5 ft 4 in)
- Weight: 58 kg (128 lb)

Sport
- Sport: Field hockey
- Position: Forward
- Club: Mannheimer HC
Youth career
- Team
- –: Los Matreros
Senior career
| Years | Team | Caps | Goals |
| 2005–2018 | Hurling | - | - |
| 2018– | Mannheimer HC | - | - |
National team
| Years | Team | Caps | Goals |
| 2009 | Argentina U21 | | - |
| 2010–2018 | Argentina | 202 | - |
Medal record
Summer Olympics
| Silver medal – second place | 2012 London | Team |
World Cup
| Bronze medal – third place | 2014 The Hague |
Champions Trophy
| Gold medal – first place | 2012 Rosario |
| Gold medal – first place | 2014 Mendoza |
| Gold medal – first place | 2016 London |
| Bronze medal – third place | 2018 Changzhou |
Pan American Games
| Silver medal – second place | 2015 Toronto | Team |
Pan American Cup
| Gold medal – first place | 2013 Mendoza |
| Gold medal – first place | 2017 Lancaster |
Junior World Cup
| Silver medal – second place | 2009 Boston |

Martina Cavallero (born 7 May 1990) is an Argentine field hockey player. At the 2012 Summer Olympics, she competed for the Argentina national team where the team achieved the silver medal. Martina also won three Champions Trophy, the World League 2014-15, the bronze medal at the 2014 World Cup and two Pan American Cups. She was also part of the 2016 Olympic team.
