= Hong Yoo-jin =

South Korean field hockey player (born 1989)

Medal record

Women's field hockey

Representing South Korea

Asian Champions Trophy
Gold medal – first place	2011 Ordos	

Hong Yoo-jin (Korean: 홍유진, born February 21, 1989) is a South Korean field hockey player. She competed for the South Korea women's national field hockey team at the 2016 Summer Olympics.
