= Giselle Juárez (field hockey) =

Argentine field hockey player

Personal information
- Full name: Giselle Estefanía Juárez
- Born: May 5, 1991 (age 35) Monte Hermoso, Argentina

Sport
- Sport: Field hockey
- Club: Club Atlético Monte Hermoso
| 2011–2017 | Argentina | 71 | - |
Medal record
Women's Field hockey
Representing Argentina
World Cup
| Bronze medal – third place | 2014 The Hague | Team |
Pan American Junior Championship
| Gold medal – first place | 2012 Guadalajara | Team |

Giselle Estefanía Juárez (born 5 May 1991) is an Argentine field hockey player. At the 2014 Hockey World Cup, she competed for the Argentina women's national field hockey team in her first major international tournament.
