= Kayla Whitelock =

New Zealand field hockey player (born 1985)

Kayla Whitelock MNZM
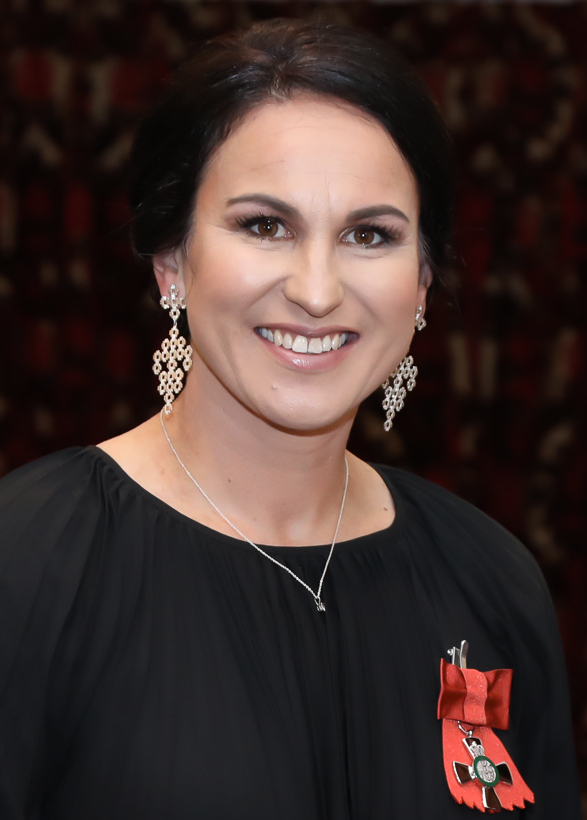
- Whitelock in 2020

Personal information
- Born: Kayla Marie Sharland; 30 October 1986 (age 39) Palmerston North, New Zealand
- Field hockey career
- Height: 1.74 m (5 ft 9 in)
- Weight: 72 kg (159 lb)
- Sport: Field hockey
- Position: Midfield
Senior career
Years	Team	Caps	Goals
–	Central Mysticks	-	-
National team
Years	Team	Caps	Goals
2003–	New Zealand	213	(52)
- Updated on 24 April 2014 (national)
Medal record
Women's field hockey
Representing New Zealand
Commonwealth Games
Silver medal – second place	2010 Delhi	Team
Bronze medal – third place	2014 Glasgow	Team
Champions Trophy
Bronze medal – third place	2011 Amstelveen
Champions Challenge
Gold medal – first place	2005 Virginia Beach
Gold medal – first place	2009 Cape Town

Kayla Marie Whitelock MNZM (née Sharland, born 30 October 1985) is a New Zealand field hockey player, and former captain of the New Zealand women's national field hockey team (the Black Sticks Women). She has competed in four Olympic Games (2004, 2008, 2012, and 2016), three Commonwealth Games (2006, 2010, and 2014) and two Hockey World Cups (2010 and 2014). She was named on the FIH's All-Star Team in 2010 and was Hockey New Zealand's player of the year in 2012.

== Biography ==
Whitelock was born in Palmerston North, and is of Rangitāne descent. She married Crusaders rugby player George Whitelock in December 2013.

Whitelock took up hockey at the age of seven, as her school only played hockey, not her preferred sport, netball.

In the 2020 Queen's Birthday Honours, Whitelock was appointed a Member of the New Zealand Order of Merit, for services to hockey.

== International senior competitions ==
- 2003 – Champions Challenge, Catania.
- 2004 – Olympic Qualifying Tournament, Auckland.
- 2004 – Olympic Games, Athens.
- 2004 – Champions Trophy, Rosario.
- 2005 – Champions Challenge, Virginia Beach.
- 2006 – Commonwealth Games, Melbourne
- 2006 – World Cup Qualifier, Rome
- 2008 – Olympic Games, Beijing
