= Krystal Forgesson =

New Zealand field hockey player

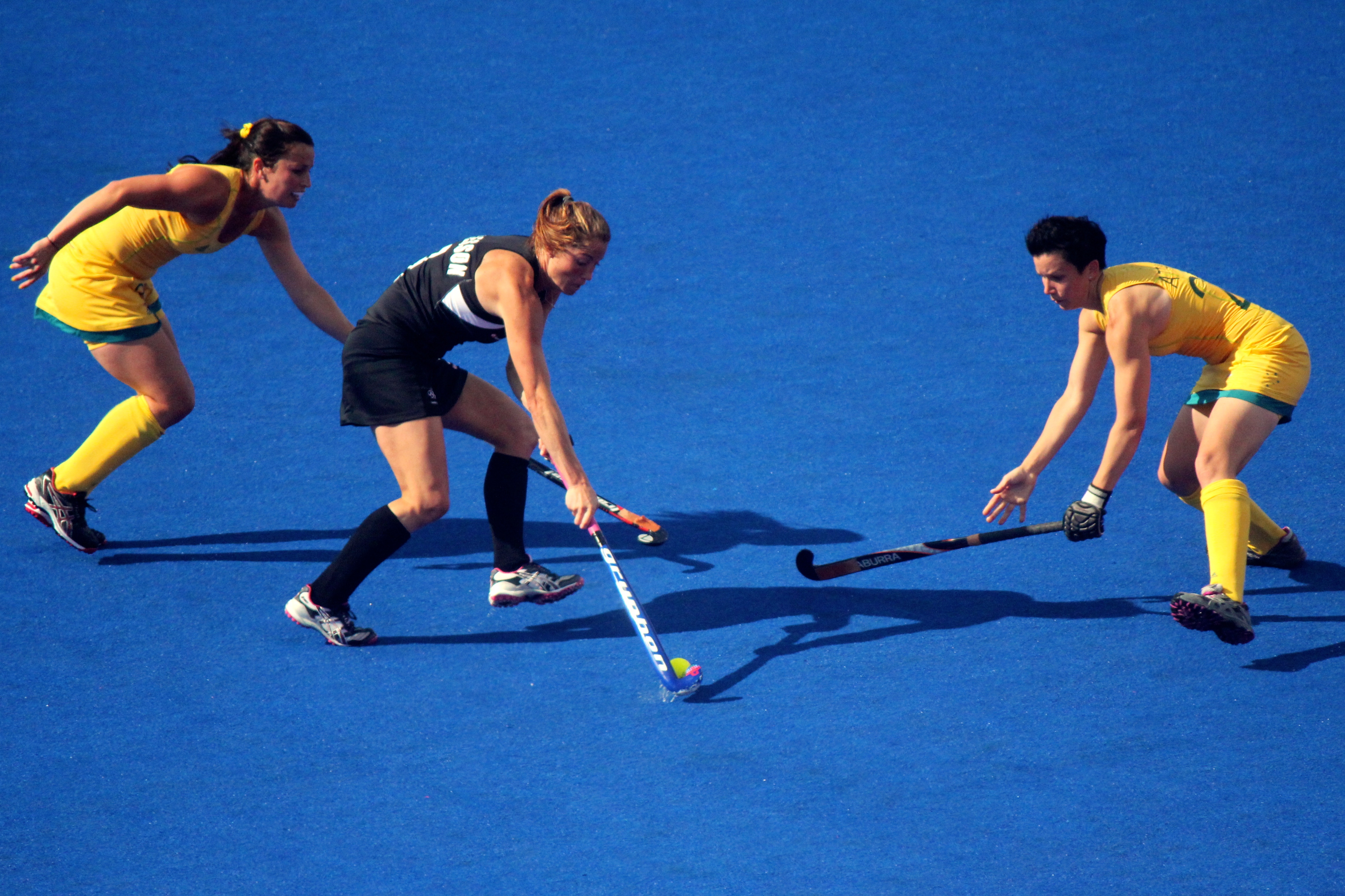
- Forgesson (centre) at the 2012 Summer Olympics

Personal information
- Born: 7 September 1982 (age 43) Auckland, New Zealand
- Height: 1.56 m (5 ft 1 in)

Sport
- Sport: Field hockey
- Position: Forward
Senior career
Years	Team	Caps	Goals
?–present	Auckland	-	-
National team
Years	Team	Caps	Goals
2005–present	New Zealand	204	(60)
Medal record
Women's field hockey
Representing New Zealand
Commonwealth Games
Silver medal – second place	2010 Delhi	Team competition
Bronze medal – third place	2014 Glasgow	Tournament
Champions Trophy
Bronze medal – third place	2011 Amstelveen	Team
Champions Challenge
Gold medal – first place	2009 Cape Town	Team
- Updated on 24 April 2014 (national)

Krystal Forgesson MNZM (born 7 September 1982) is a New Zealand field hockey player. She has competed for the New Zealand women's national field hockey team (the Black Sticks Women) since 2005, including for the team at the 2006, 2010 and 2014 Commonwealth Games, and at the 2008 and 2012 Summer Olympics.

In the 2016 New Year Honours, Forgesson was appointed a Member of the New Zealand Order of Merit for services to hockey.
