= Gemma Flynn =

New Zealand field hockey player

Gemma McCaw
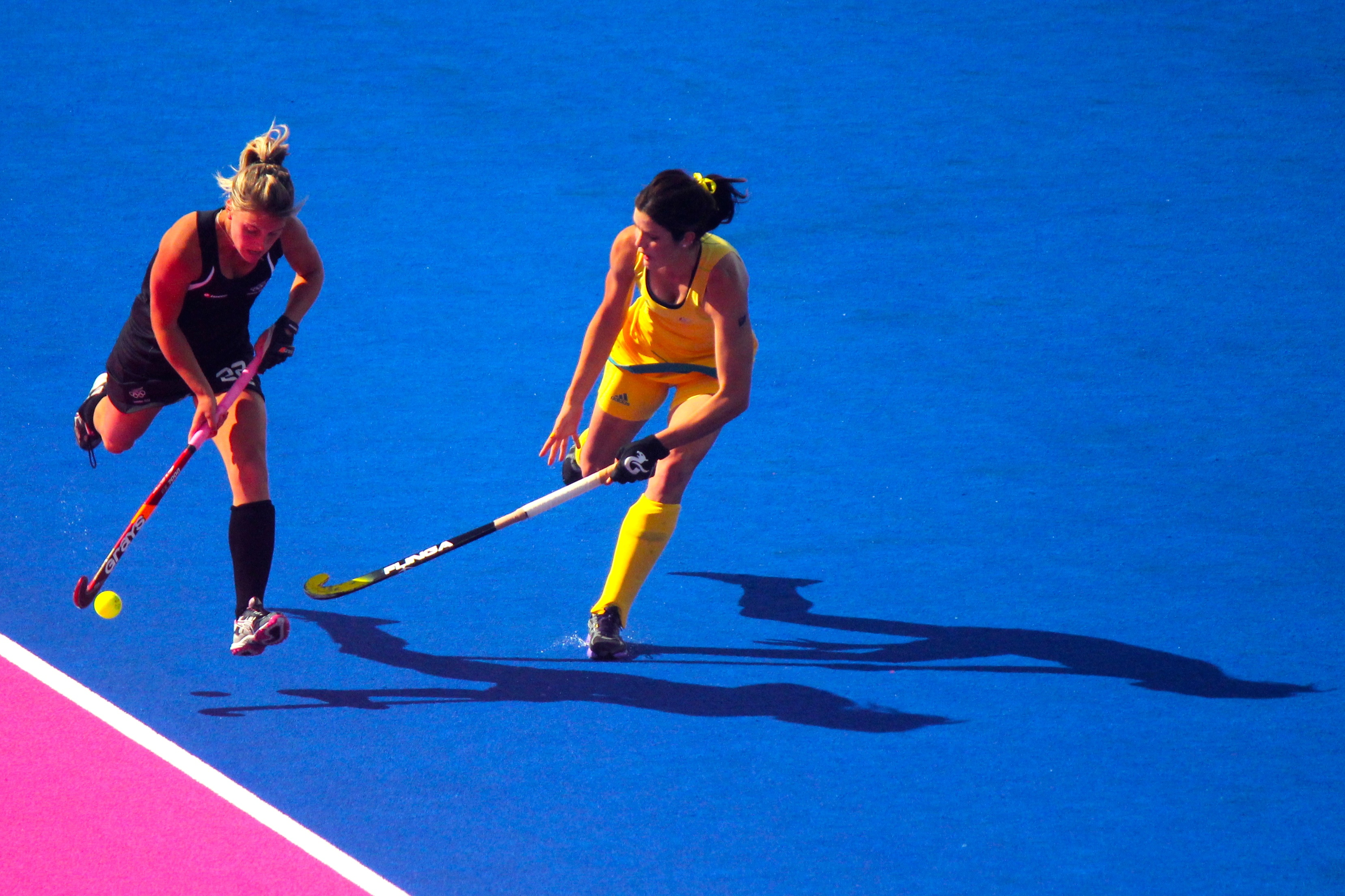

Personal information
- Born: Gemma Michelle Flynn; 2 May 1990 (age 36) Tauranga, New Zealand
- Height: 1.68 m (5 ft 6 in)
- Weight: 60 kg (132 lb)

Sport
- Sport: Field hockey
- Position: Striker/Midfield
Senior career
Years	Team	Caps	Goals
–	Midlands	-	-
National team
Years	Team	Caps	Goals
2008–	New Zealand	246	(71)
Medal record
Commonwealth Games
Silver medal – second place	2010 Delhi	Team
Bronze medal – third place	2014 Glasgow	Team
Champions Trophy
Bronze medal – third place	2011 Amstelveen
Champions Challenge
Gold medal – first place	2009 Cape Town
- Updated on 15 January 2017 (national)

Gemma Michelle McCaw (née Flynn; born 2 May 1990) is a New Zealand field hockey player who has represented her country in three Summer Olympics (2008, 2012, and 2016).

== Early life ==
Born in Tauranga, Gemma McCaw is the youngest child and only daughter of Rob and Michelle Flynn. Of Māori descent, McCaw affiliates to Te Arawa. She was educated at Tauranga Girls' College, and studied sports science at Massey University. She graduated with a Bachelor of Sport and Exercise degree from Massey in 2017.

== Hockey ==
As Gemma Flynn, she has competed for the New Zealand women's national field hockey team (the Black Sticks Women) since 2008, including for the team at the 2008 and 2012 Summer Olympics, 2016 Summer Olympics and at the 2010 and 2014 Commonwealth Games. In 2009 she was nominated for the FIH Women's Young Player of the Year. At both the 2012 and 2016 Olympics, her team lost the bronze medal game and thus came fourth. She was part of the team which made it to the final game of the FIH World League in 2015, but the team lost 5–1 against Argentina.

Following the 2016 Summer Olympics, she took an extended break from hockey and later decided to retire. She came out of retirement in November 2019. In February 2020, she reached her 250th cap for the national team. Gemma McCaw had intentions of competing again in the 2020 Summer Olympics in Tokyo but with it being delayed due to the COVID-19 pandemic decided against it.

== Outside hockey ==
Alongside Luuka Jones, Kane Williamson, Ria Hall, and Tiki Taane, Gemma McCaw is one of the celebrities behind the Bay of Plenty's No Place Like Home tourist campaign launched on 25 January 2016. In October 2016 she became an ambassador for the New Zealand Breast Cancer Foundation. McCaw is also a Sport New Zealand ambassador.

== Personal life ==
In 2013, it was reported that Flynn was dating All Blacks captain Richie McCaw. She moved to Christchurch in 2014 to be with him, became engaged to him in early 2016, and married him on 14 January 2017. They have three daughters, born in December 2018, in May 2021 and in April 2023.
