= Han Hye-lyoung =

South Korean field hockey player

Medal record

Women's field hockey

Representing South Korea

Asian Games
Gold medal – first place	2014 Incheon	Team

Asia Cup
Silver medal – second place	2007 Hong Kong	
Silver medal – second place	2013 Kuala Lumpur	
Bronze medal – third place	2009 Bangkok	

Asian Champions Trophy
Gold medal – first place	2011 Ordos	

- Han Hye-lyoung
- Hangul: 한혜령
- RR: Han Hyeryeong
- MR: Han Hyeryŏng

Han Hye-lyoung (Korean: 한혜령; born 15 January 1986) is a South Korean field hockey player. At the 2008 and 2012 Summer Olympics she competed with the Korea women's national field hockey team in the women's tournament.

She won a gold medal as a member of the South Korean team at 2014 Asian Games.
