= Petrea Webster =

New Zealand field hockey player

Personal information
- Born: 30 March 1988 (age 38) Auckland, New Zealand
- Height: 1.65 m (5 ft 5 in)
- Weight: 56 kg (123 lb)

Sport
- Sport: Field hockey
- Position: Forward
Senior career
Years	Team	Caps	Goals
–	North Harbour	-	-
National team
Years	Team	Caps	Goals
2011–	New Zealand	68	(16)
Medal record
Commonwealth Games
Bronze medal – third place	2014 Glasgow	Team
- Updated on 20 June 2014 (national)

Petrea Webster (born 30 March 1988) is a New Zealand field hockey player. She has competed for the New Zealand women's national field hockey team (the Black Sticks Women) since 2011, including at the 2014 Women's Hockey World Cup. She will compete for the team at the 2014 Commonwealth Games.

Born in Auckland, Webster was selected for the Black Sticks in February 2011, and played her first test against Japan the following month. She works as a physical education teacher at Carmel College on Auckland's North Shore.
