= Katie Glynn =

New Zealand field hockey player

Katie Glynn MNZM
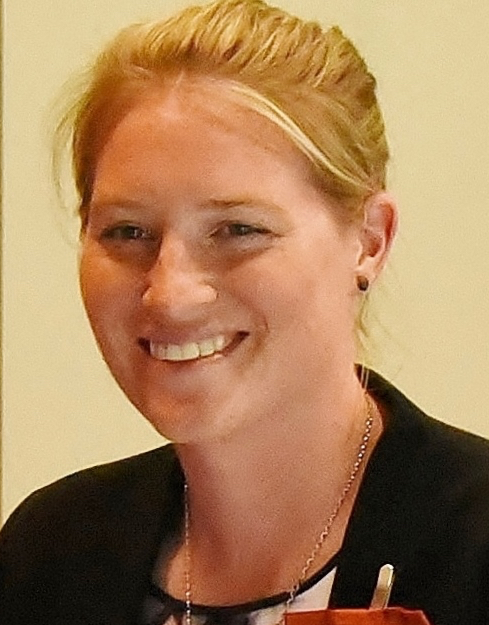
- Katie Glynn in 2017
- Born: 14 March 1989 (age 37); Auckland, New Zealand
- Field hockey career
- Height: 1.74 m (5 ft 9 in)
- Sport: Field hockey
- Position: Forward
Senior career
Years	Team	Caps	Goals
?–present	Roskill	-	-
National team
Years	Team	Caps	Goals
2009–present	New Zealand	134	(77)
Medal record
Women's field hockey
Representing New Zealand
Commonwealth Games
Silver medal – second place	2010 Delhi	Team competition
Bronze medal – third place	2014 Glasgow	Team competition
Champions Trophy
Bronze medal – third place	2011 Amstelveen	Tournament
Champions Challenge
Gold medal – first place	2009 Cape Town	Tournament
- Updated on 24 April 2014 (national)

Katie Alexandra Glynn MNZM (born 14 March 1989) is a New Zealand field hockey player. She has competed for the New Zealand women's national field hockey team, including at the 2010 Commonwealth Games, the 2012 Summer Olympics and the 2014 Commonwealth Games.

Glynn was first selected for the Black Sticks Women in June 2009, along with ten other players as the Black Sticks squad was overhauled following its last place finish at the 2008 Beijing Olympics.

She was noted for the semi-final match between New Zealand and the Netherlands at the 2012 Olympics, where eleven minutes into the second half, she was accidentally smacked in the head by the hockey stick of opponent forward Ellen Hoog as Hoog attempted to shoot at goal. Despite the resulting wound in her head requiring five staples and two sutures, Glynn returned to the game later in the second half heavily bandaged, and later was compared to New Zealand cricketer Bert Sutcliffe and his return after a head injury in the 1953–54 South African tour.
