= Stacey Michelsen =

New Zealand field hockey player

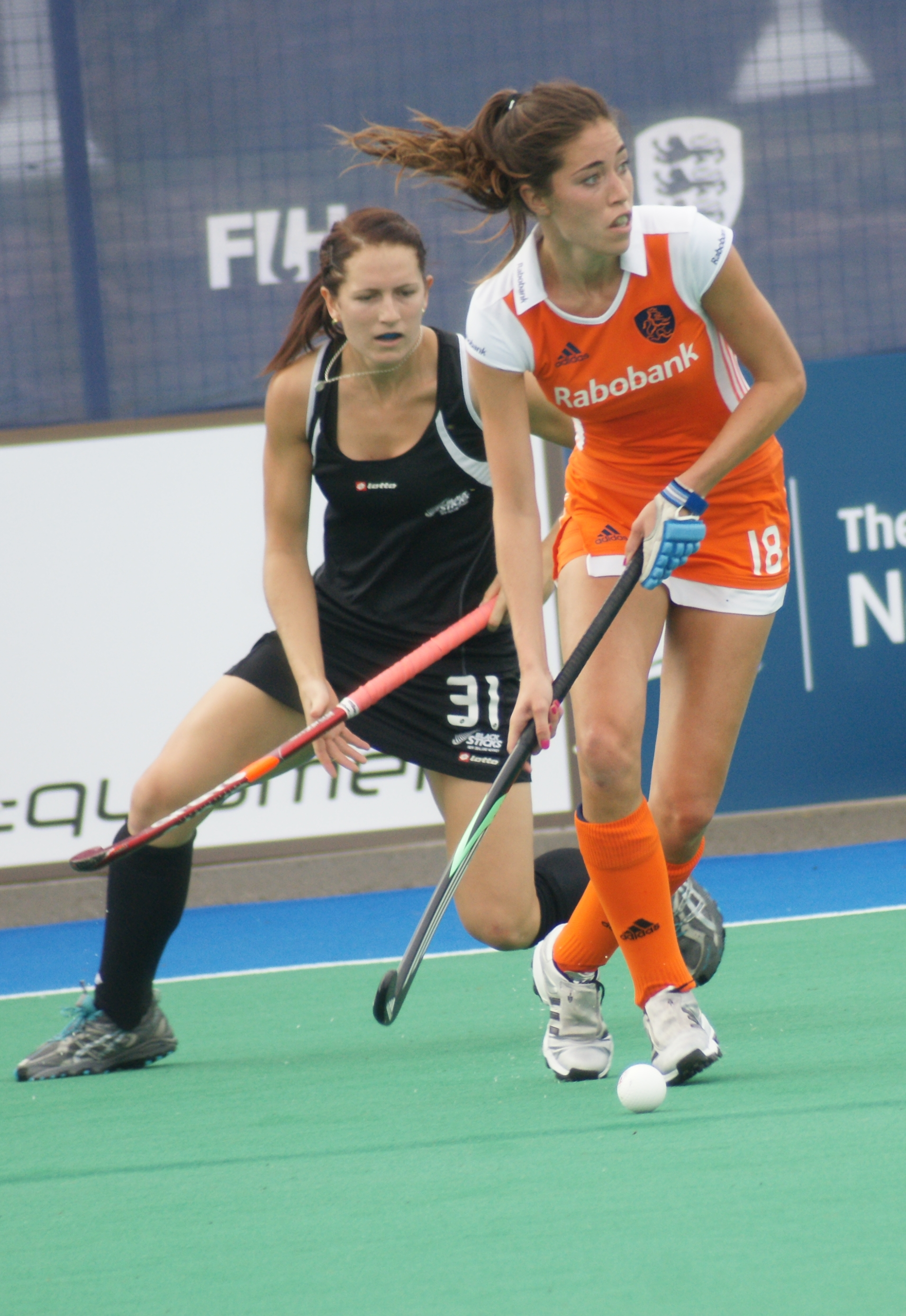
- Michelsen (in black) and Naomi van As

Personal information
- Born: 18 February 1991 (age 35) Whangārei, New Zealand
- Height: 1.73 m (5 ft 8 in)
- Weight: 66 kg (146 lb)

Sport
- Sport: Field hockey
- Position: Midfielder
- Club: Northland
Senior career
Years	Team	Caps	Goals
2004–	Northland	-	-
National team
Years	Team	Caps	Goals
2009–2021	New Zealand	254	(15)
Medal record
Representing New Zealand
Women's field hockey
Commonwealth Games
Gold medal – first place	2018 Gold Coast	Team
Silver medal – second place	2010 Delhi	Team
Bronze medal – third place	2014 Glasgow	Team
Champions Trophy
Bronze medal – third place	2011 Amstelveen
Oceania Cup
Gold medal – first place	2019 Rockhampton
Silver medal – second place	2017 Sydney

Stacey Michelsen (born 18 February 1991) is a New Zealand field hockey player. She has competed for the New Zealand women's national field hockey team (the Black Sticks Women), including for the team at the 2010, 2014 and 2018 Commonwealth Games and the 2012 and 2016 Summer Olympics.

== Career ==
Michelsen was first selected for the Black Sticks Women in June 2009, along with ten other players as the Black Sticks squad was overhauled following its last place finish at the 2008 Beijing Olympics. In February 2012, she was named the 2011 women's Young Player of the Year in the International Hockey Federation's (FIH) Player of the Year Awards.

Born in Whangārei, Michelsen attended Kamo Intermediate and Kamo High School in Whangārei and St Cuthbert's College in Auckland. She studies law and business at the University of Auckland. She announced her retirement from international play on 21 October 2021.
