= Anita Punt =

New Zealand field hockey player

Anita McLaren
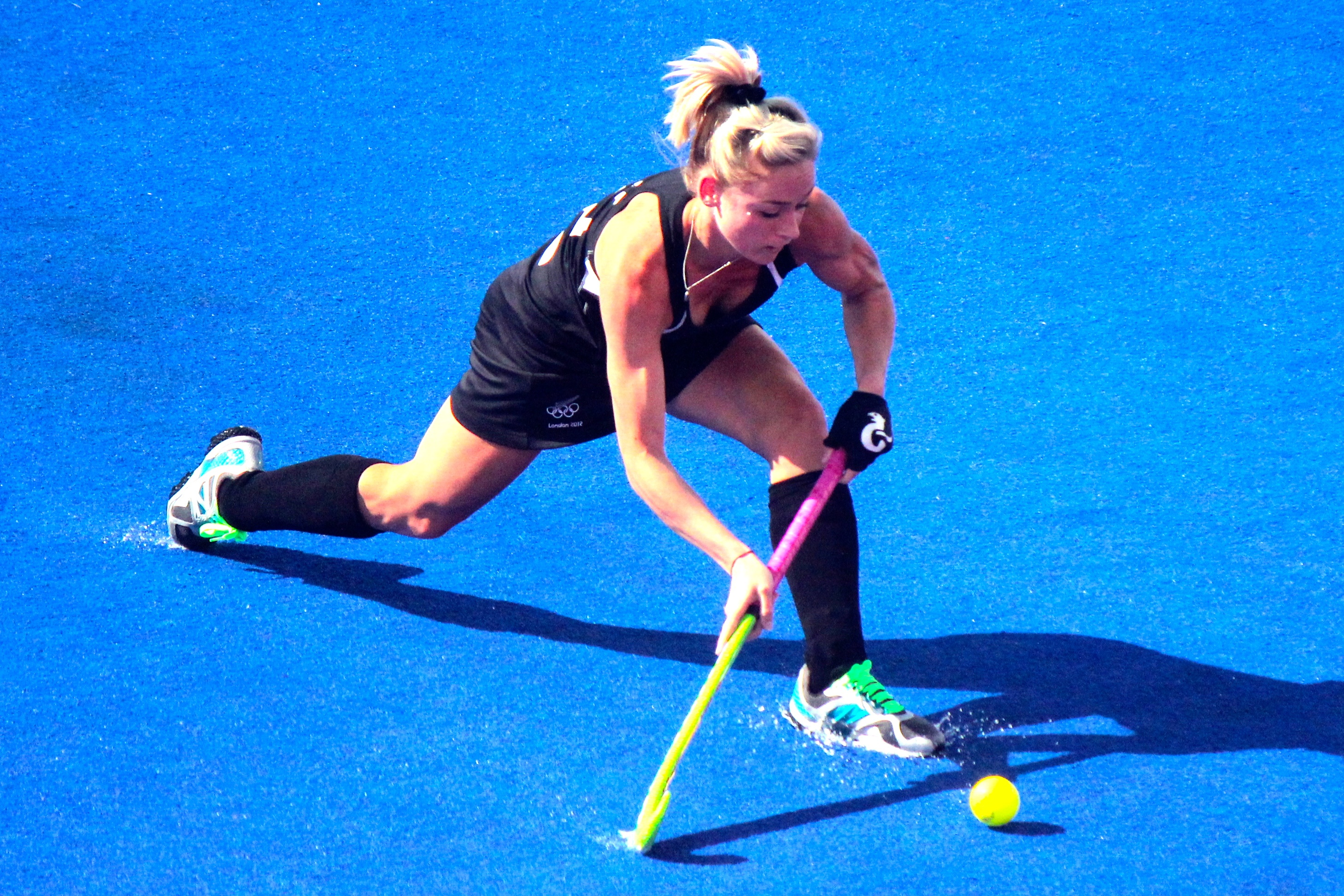
- McLaren at the 2012 Summer Olympics

Personal information
- Born: 2 October 1987 (age 39) Nelson, New Zealand
- Height: 1.63 m (5 ft 4 in)
- Weight: 55 kg (121 lb)

Sport
- Sport: Field hockey
- Position: Midfielder
- Club: Capital
Senior career
Years	Team	Caps	Goals
2005–	Capital	-	-
National team
Years	Team	Caps	Goals
2009–2018	New Zealand	264	(42)
Medal record
Representing New Zealand
Women's field hockey
Commonwealth Games
Gold medal – first place	2018 Gold Coast	Team
Silver medal – second place	2010 Delhi	Team
Bronze medal – third place	2014 Glasgow	Team
Champions Trophy
Bronze medal – third place	2011 Amstelveen
Champions Challenge
Gold medal – first place	2009 Cape Town

Anita McLaren (née Punt; born 2 October 1987) is a New Zealand field hockey player. She competed for the New Zealand women's national field hockey team (the Black Sticks Women) from 2009 to 2018, including for the team at the 2010 Commonwealth Games and the 2012 Summer Olympics.

== Career ==
Born in Nelson to Nicolaas and Adele McLaren, Anita Punt is of Dutch descent through her father and holds dual New Zealand and Dutch citizenship. She attended Waimea College in nearby Richmond, before moving to Wellington at age 18 to focus on her hockey with the Capital National Hockey League team. McLaren was first selected for the Black Sticks Women in June 2009, along with ten other players as the Black Sticks squad was overhauled following its last place finish at the 2008 Beijing Olympics. She played her first match for New Zealand on 19 June 2009 against India in hometown Nelson. She helped New Zealand win a bronze medal at the 2014 Commonwealth Games, scoring the first goal in the bronze medal match.

McLaren has a reputation for her speed, being touted as one of the fastest female hockey players in the world with a time over ten metres ranking her within the top eight of the Black Sticks Men's squad. In February 2013, McLaren was entered as a wildcard entry into the annual International Track Meet in Christchurch, in which she won the 100 metres in 12.61 seconds (on a grass track and with a strong 2.9 m/s headwind), beating many seasoned New Zealand track athletes. She later won the 100 metres and 200 metres at the Porritt Classic in Hamilton, before competing in the New Zealand Track and Field Championships in March 2013 in Auckland. However, McLaren was off pace and came fifth in the 100 metres, with a time of 12.23 seconds (wind +0.1 m/s).

As of August 2012, McLaren resided on the North Shore of Auckland. She is a retail assistant by trade, but is currently studying veterinary nursing. She married decathlete Scott McLaren in March 2016.

McLaren announced her retirement from international hockey in October 2018. She subsequently headed the sport department at King's College in Auckland.
