= 2012–13 Women's FIH Hockey World League Round 2 =

Field hockey tournament

Tournament details
- Dates: 21 January – 10 March 2013
- Teams: 22 (from 5 confederations)
- Venue: 4 (in 4 host cities)

Tournament statistics
- Matches played: 50
- Goals scored: 258 (5.16 per match)
- Top scorer: (South Africa) Pietie Coetzee (10 goals)

The 2012–13 Women's FIH Hockey World League Round 2 was held from February to March 2013. A total of 22 teams competed in 4 events were part in this round of the tournament playing for 8 berths in the Semifinals, played in June 2013.

== Qualification ==
8 teams ranked between 9th and 16th in the FIH World Rankings current at the time of seeking entries for the competition qualified automatically. As Canada and Ukraine withdrew from participating, only 13 teams qualified from Round 1. Additionally one nation that did not meet ranking criteria and was exempt from Round 1 hosted a Round 2 tournament. The following 22 teams, shown with final pre-tournament rankings, competed in this round of the tournament.

Dates	Event	Location	Quotas	Qualifier(s)
	Ranked 9th to 16th in the FIH World Rankings		8	Japan (9); Spain (15); India (12); South Africa (11); United States (10); Azerbaijan (16); Ireland (14); Chile (18)
	Host nation		1	Brazil (51)
14–19 August 2012	2012–13 FIH Hockey World League Round 1	Prague, Czech Republic	4	Belarus (21); Italy (17); Scotland (19); Czech Republic (37)
7–9 September 2012	2012–13 FIH Hockey World League Round 1	Accra, Ghana	1	Ghana (31)
14–16 September 2012	2012–13 FIH Hockey World League Round 1	Kuantan, Malaysia	2	Malaysia (22); Kazakhstan (33)
18–23 September 2012	2012–13 FIH Hockey World League Round 1	Vienna, Austria	3	Belgium (13); Russia (20); Austria (29)
11–17 November 2012	2012–13 FIH Hockey World League Round 1	Port of Spain, Trinidad and Tobago	2	Uruguay (50); Trinidad and Tobago (27)
8–15 December 2012	2012–13 FIH Hockey World League Round 1	Suva, Fiji	1	Fiji (59)
Total			22	

== Cape Town ==
- Cape Town, South Africa, 21–27 January 2013.

=== Results ===
==== Standings ====
Pos	Team	Pld	W	SOW	SOL	L	GF	GA	GD	Pts	Qualification
1	South Africa	4	4	0	0	0	18	2	+16	12	HWL Semifinals
2	Belgium	4	3	0	0	1	18	3	+15	9	HWL Semifinals
3	Azerbaijan	4	2	0	0	2	6	9	−3	6	
4	Austria	4	1	0	0	3	3	13	−10	3	
5	Ghana	4	0	0	0	4	1	19	−18	0	

Source: FIH
Rules for classification: 1) points percentage; 2) matches won; 3) goal difference; 4) goals for; 5) head-to-head result; 6) field goals scored.

==== Fixtures ====
21 January 2013
17:00

Azerbaijan	4–0	Ghana
Mammadova 4', 34'; Aliyava 33'; Muradi 58'	Report

Umpires:
Irene Presenqui (ARG)
Xenia Ulrich (AUT)

21 January 2013
19:00

Belgium	8–0	Austria
Boon 11', 20'; De Groof 24'; Delmée 34'; De Vos 39'; Sinia 43'; Coppey 46', 49'	Report

Umpires:
Saadat Zakiyeva (AZE)
Lia Waine (ENG)

22 January 2013
17:00

Azerbaijan	2–1	Austria
Druzhinina 1'; Mammadova 31'	Report	Rubas 46'

Umpires:
Annelize Rostron (RSA)
Hagar Laryea (GHA)

22 January 2013
19:00

South Africa	6–0	Ghana
Chamberlain 4', 10', 42'; Coetzee 7', 69'; Coston 30'	Report

Umpires:
Xenia Ulrich (AUT)
Laurine Delforge (BEL)

24 January 2013
17:00

Austria	2–1	Ghana
Turek 13'; Zerbs 27'	Report	Tenkorang 5'

Umpires:
Annelize Rostron (RSA)
Saadat Zakiyeva (AZE)

24 January 2013
19:00

Belgium	2–3	South Africa
Delmée 27'; De Groof 32'	Report	Coetzee 10', 42', 69'

Umpires:
Irene Presenqui (ARG)
Lia Waine (ENG)

26 January 2013
16:00

Ghana	0–7	Belgium
	Report	De Groof 24', 10', 35', 60'; Gerniers 24'; Coppey 25'; Delmée 27'

Umpires:
Lia Waine (ENG)
Saadat Zakiyeva (AZE)

26 January 2013
18:00

Azerbaijan	0–7	South Africa
	Report	Mayne 13'; Chamberlain 17', 43'; Coetzee 31', 39', 58'; Bright 49'

Umpires:
Laurine Delforge (BEL)
Irene Presenqui (ARG)

27 January 2013
15:00

Belgium	1–0	Azerbaijan
Nelen 45'	Report

Umpires:
Annelize Rostron (RSA)
Irene Presenqui (ARG)

27 January 2013
17:00

South Africa	2–0	Austria
Coetzee 9', 15'	Report

Umpires:
Laurine Delforge (BEL)
Hagar Laryea (GHA)

== New Delhi ==
- New Delhi, India, 18–24 February 2013.

=== Results ===
==== Standings ====
Pos	Team	Pld	W	SOW	SOL	L	GF	GA	GD	Pts	Qualification
1	India	5	4	0	1	0	24	2	+22	13	HWL Semifinals
2	Japan	5	3	2	0	0	32	3	+29	13	HWL Semifinals
3	Malaysia	5	3	0	0	2	18	9	+9	9	
4	Russia	5	2	0	1	2	19	6	+13	7	
5	Kazakhstan	5	1	0	0	4	6	30	−24	3	
6	Fiji	5	0	0	0	5	0	49	−49	0	

Source: FIH
Rules for classification: 1) points percentage; 2) matches won; 3) goal difference; 4) goals for; 5) head-to-head result; 6) field goals scored.

==== Fixtures ====
18 February 2013
10:00

Japan	14–0	Fiji
Sakai 9', 34', 61'; Komazawa 12', 14'; Kato 17'; Nakagawa 20'; Ueda 28'; Banda 32', 37'; Iwao 43'; Mitsuhashi 45'; Nishimura 66'; Nagai 68'	Report

Umpires:
Kelly Hudson (NZL)
Nur Hafizah Azman (MAS)

18 February 2013
12:00

Russia	1–3	Malaysia
Zhashkova 58'	Report	Othman 9'; Md Ali 42'; Sylvester Silin 64'

Umpires:
Ikumi Negishi (JPN)
Anupama Puchimanda (IND)

18 February 2013
18:00

India	8–0	Kazakhstan
J. Kaur 8', 21', 54', 70+'; Rani 15', 26', 41'; Yendala 48'	Report

Umpires:
Liu Xiaoying (CHN)
Natalya Kadyrova (RUS)

19 February 2013
16:00

Fiji	0–9	Russia
	Report	Krasnoperova 13', 39', 47'; Shaburova 26', 28'; Doronina 20', 57'; Svezhentseva 65'; Drepenkina 68'

Umpires:
Liu Xiaoying (CHN)
Nur Hafizah Azman (MAS)

19 February 2013
18:00

Japan	11–0	Kazakhstan
Arai 5', 29', 37'; Sakai 10'; Nakagawa 13'; Nagai 16'; Banda 34'; 41'; Nishimura 42'; Ota 46'; Komazawa 59'	Report

Umpires:
Anupama Puchimanda (IND)
Toh Li Min (SIN)

19 February 2013
20:00

India	3–0	Malaysia
Vandana 9', 38'; Rani 65'	Report

Umpires:
Kelly Hudson (NZL)
Amina Dyussembekova (KAZ)

21 February 2013
10:00

Russia	1–1	Japan
Ivanova 13'	Report	Mitsuhashi 69'
Penalties
Svezhentseva (penalty shoot-out scored); Krasnoparova (penalty shoot-out missed); Shaburova (penalty shoot-out scored); Drepenkina (penalty shoot-out missed); Ivanonva (penalty shoot-out missed)	2–3	(penalty shoot-out scored) Arai; (penalty shoot-out missed) Nakagawa; (penalty shoot-out scored) Nagai; (penalty shoot-out missed) Nishimura; (penalty shoot-out scored) Komazawa

Umpires:
Kelly Hudson (NZL)
Natalya Kadyrova (RUS)

21 February 2013
12:00

Malaysia	3–1	Kazakhstan
Ruhani 4'; Halim 27'; Azlin Noor SumantriSumantri 33'	Report	Domashneva 68'

Umpires:
Kelly Hudson (NZL)
Ikumi Negishi (JPN)

21 February 2013
18:00

Fiji	0–10	India
	Report	Yendala 21'; Toppo 11'; Dung Dung 15', 45'; Rani 22', 61'; N. Kaur 38'; J. Kaur 59', 69'; Thokchom 66'

Umpires:
Natalya Kadyrova (RUS)
Amina Dyussembekova (KAZ)

22 February 2013
16:00

Kazakhstan	1–8	Russia
Domashneva 41'	Report	Shaburova 25', 69'; Ivanova 52', 59'; Krasnoperova 11'; Shumilina 39'; Vasileva 50'; Sorokina 64'

Umpires:
Anupama Puchimanda (IND)
Nur Hafizah Azman (MAS)

22 February 2013
18:00

Malaysia	12–0	Fiji
Sylvester Silin 6', 58'; Abdul Rahman 11', 40', 68'; Sumantri 15', 33'; Othman 43'; Ruhani 44', 66', 69'; Mohamad Din 53'	Report

Umpires:
Toh Li Min (SIN)
Ikumi Negishi (JPN)

22 February 2013
20:00

India	2–2	Japan
Yendala 62'; Barla 65'	Report	Sakai 4'; Ota 31'
Penalties
Thokchom (penalty shoot-out missed); Ritu (penalty shoot-out missed); Vandana (penalty shoot-out missed); Yendala (penalty shoot-out scored); Rani (penalty shoot-out scored)	2–3	(penalty shoot-out scored) Arai; (penalty shoot-out scored) Nagai; (penalty shoot-out missed) Ota; (penalty shoot-out missed) Kato; (penalty shoot-out scored) Komazawa

Umpires:
Kelly Hudson (NZL)
Natalya Kadyrova (RUS)

24 February 2013
10:00

Kazakhstan	4–0	Fiji
Gataulina 5'; Domashneva 10', 48'; Imangaliyeva 63'	Report

Umpires:
Anupama Puchimanda (IND)
Toh Li Min (SIN)

24 February 2013
14:00

Japan	4–0	Malaysia
Nishimura 31'; Mitsuhashi 45'; Kato 51'; Ueda 55'	Report

Umpires:
Liu Xiaoying (CHN)
Kelly Hudson (NZL)

24 February 2013
18:00

Russia	0–1	India
	Report	Rani 51'

Umpires:
Nur Hafizah Azman (MAS)
Ikumi Negishi (JPN)

== Valencia ==
- Valencia, Spain, 25 February–3 March 2013.

=== Results ===
==== Standings ====
Pos	Team	Pld	W	SOW	SOL	L	GF	GA	GD	Pts	Qualification
1	Italy	4	2	1	1	0	12	3	+9	9	HWL Semifinals
2	Spain	4	2	1	0	1	12	5	+7	8	HWL Semifinals
3	Belarus	4	2	0	1	1	12	8	+4	7	
4	Ireland	4	2	0	0	2	5	4	+1	6	
5	Czech Republic	4	0	0	0	4	2	23	−21	0	

Source: FIH
Rules for classification: 1) points percentage; 2) matches won; 3) goal difference; 4) goals for; 5) head-to-head result; 6) field goals scored.

==== Fixtures ====
25 February 2013
10:30

Ireland	4–1	Czech Republic
Jacob 17'; Connery 34'; O'Flynn 37'; Gray 52'	Report	Košťálová 5'

Umpires:
Carolina Brunekreef (NED)
Liudmila Aleinikoviene (BLR)

25 February 2013
13:00

Italy	2–2	Belarus
Padalino 16'; Ruggieri 30'	Report	Mikheichyk 34'; Stsifutkina 36'
Penalties
Wybieralska (penalty shoot-out scored); Bertarini (penalty shoot-out scored); Padalino (penalty shoot-out missed); Ruggieri (penalty shoot-out scored)	3–1	(penalty shoot-out scored) Mikheichyk; (penalty shoot-out missed) Stsifutkina; (penalty shoot-out missed) Batura; (penalty shoot-out missed) Kulinkovich

Umpires:
Aisling Keogh (IRL)
Nuria Ribo Capisrany (ESP)

26 February 2013
11:00

Ireland	0–2	Belarus
	Report	Zabrotskaya 50'; Syrayezkha 66'

Umpires:
Caroline Brunekreef (NED)
Helena Babička (CZE)

26 February 2013
13:30

Spain	6–0	Czech Republic
Romagosa 5'; Guajardo 9'; Huertas 11', 65'; Pérez 16'; Oliva 67'	Report

Umpires:
Liudmila Aleinikoviene (BLR)
Ivona Makar (CRO)

1 March 2013^{1}
10:00

Belarus	5–1	Czech Republic
Batura 21', 50'; Mikheichyk 61', 65'; Piotukh 69'	Report	Bížová 45'

Umpires:
Aisling Keogh (IRL)
Nuria Ribo Capisrany (ESP)

1 March 2013^{1}
12:00

Italy	1–1	Spain
di Bernardo 53'	Report	Ybarra 65'
Penalties
Wybieralska (penalty shoot-out scored); Bertarini (penalty shoot-out missed); Padalino (penalty shoot-out scored); Ruggieri (penalty shoot-out scored) di Bernardo (penalty shoot-out missed) —— Ruggieri (penalty shoot-out missed); Wybieralska (penalty shoot-out missed)	3–4	(penalty shoot-out scored) Romagosa; (penalty shoot-out missed) Ybarra; (penalty shoot-out missed) Riera; (penalty shoot-out scored) Pineiro; (penalty shoot-out scored) Bonastre —— (penalty shoot-out missed) Romagosa; (penalty shoot-out scored) Bonastre

Umpires:
Caroline Brunekreef (NED)
Ivona Makar (CRO)

^{1}The match Belarus–Czech Republic was suspended due to heavy rain in the first half (1–0). The matchday was cancelled and moved a day back.

2 March 2013
10:30

Czech Republic	0–8	Italy
	Report	Wybieralska 4', 42'; Padalino 19', 57', 63'; Mirabella 34'; Bertarini 50'; Tiddi 53'

Umpires:
Liudmila Aleinikoviene (BLR)
Nuria Ribo Capisrany (ESP)

2 March 2013
13:00

Ireland	1–0	Spain
O'Flynn 25'	Report

Umpires:
Helena Babička (CZE)
Ivona Makar (CRO)

3 March 2013
11:00

Italy	1–0	Ireland
Pacella 55'	Report

Umpires:
Caroline Brunekreef (NED)
Liudmila Aleinikoviene (BLR)

3 March 2013
13:30

Spain	5–3	Belarus
Riera 3', 16', 53'; Huertas 31'; Oliva 32'	Report	Syrayezhka 21', 52'; Kulinkovich 44'

Umpires:
Aisling Keogh (IRL)
Ivona Makar (CRO)

== Rio de Janeiro ==
- Rio de Janeiro, Brazil, 4–10 March 2013.

=== Results ===
==== Standings ====
Pos	Team	Pld	W	SOW	SOL	L	GF	GA	GD	Pts	Qualification
1	United States	5	4	0	1	0	18	2	+16	13	HWL Semifinals
2	Chile	5	3	0	1	1	16	5	+11	10	HWL Semifinals
3	Scotland	5	2	2	0	1	18	5	+13	10	
4	Uruguay	5	3	0	0	2	12	7	+5	9	
5	Trinidad and Tobago	5	1	0	0	4	4	26	−22	3	
6	Brazil	5	0	0	0	5	2	25	−23	0	

Source: FIH
Rules for classification: 1) points percentage; 2) matches won; 3) goal difference; 4) goals for; 5) head-to-head result; 6) field goals scored.

==== Fixtures ====
4 March 2013
09:00

United States	6–0	Brazil
Laubach 21', 49'; Gonzalez 47'; Reinprecht 51'; O'Donnell 55'; Pfeiffer 65'	Report

Umpires:
Sophie Ashcroft (SCO)
Ayanna McClean (TRI)

4 March 2013
11:00

Chile	2–0	Uruguay
Greene 3'; Villalabeitia 19'	Report

Umpires:
Mercedes Sanchéz (ARG)
Stephanie Judefind (USA)

4 March 2013
15:30

Scotland	7–0	Trinidad and Tobago
Kidd 4', 65'; Bunce 17'; Bell 23', 26'; Ralph 42'; Cram 67'	Report

Umpires:
Maricel Sanchéz (ARG)
Suzi Sutton (USA)

6 March 2013
09:00

United States	3–0	Uruguay
Reinprecht 21'; Pfeiffer 60'; Wold 68'	Report

Umpires:
Mercedes Sanchéz (ARG)
Ayanna McClean (TRI)

6 March 2013
11:00

Chile	6–0	Trinidad and Tobago
García 3'; Lagos 28'; Villagra 29', 41'; Infante 67', 68'	Report

Umpires:
Suzi Sutton (USA)
Sophie Ashcroft (SCO)

6 March 2013
15:30

Brazil	0–7	Scotland
	Report	Bunce 8', 40'; Clement 29', 61'; Davis 44'; Cram 52'; Bell 65'

Umpires:
Ana Vásquez (MEX)
Catalina Ortíz (CHI)

7 March 2013
09:00

Brazil	1–5	Chile
Cabral 52'	Report	Caram 3', 55', 70'; García 48'; Walbaum 66'

Umpires:
Mercedes Sanchéz (ARG)
Suzi Sutton (USA)

7 March 2013
11:00

Scotland	1–1	United States
Kidd 50'	Report	Albini 14'
Penalties
Kidd (penalty shoot-out scored); Judge (penalty shoot-out missed); Clement (penalty shoot-out missed); Bunce (penalty shoot-out scored)	2–0	(penalty shoot-out missed) O'Donnell; (penalty shoot-out missed) Gonzalez; (penalty shoot-out missed) Falgowski; (penalty shoot-out missed) Kasold

Umpires:
Maricel Sanchéz (ARG)
Ayanna McClean (TRI)

7 March 2013
15:30

Trinidad and Tobago	1–6	Uruguay
Wynne 45'	Report	De María 7', 29'; Bisignano 9'; Villar 23'; Lamberti 64'; Olaso 66'

Umpires:
Sophie Ashcroft (SCO)
Stephanie Judefind (USA)

9 March 2013
09:00

Trinidad and Tobago	3–1	Brazil
Ashton 11'; Wynne 22'; Layne 70'	Report	Boos 48'

Umpires:
Maricel Sanchéz (ARG)
Ana Vásquez (MEX)

9 March 2013
11:00

Chile	1–2	United States
Caram 68'	Report	Wold 39'; Gonzalez 66'

Umpires:
Mercedes Sanchéz (ARG)
Sophie Ashcroft (SCO)

9 March 2013
15:30

Uruguay	2–1	Scotland
Stanley 28'; De María 51'	Report	Clement 55'

Umpires:
Stephanie Judefind (USA)
Ayanna McClean (TRI)

10 March 2013
09:00

United States	6–0	Trinidad and Tobago
Laubach 3', 54'; Pfeiffer 23'; O'Donnell 31'; Albini 35'; Witmer 52'	Report

Umpires:
Maricel Sanchéz (ARG)
Sophie Ashcroft (SCO)

10 March 2013
11:00

Scotland	2–2	Chile
Kidd 49', 68'	Report	Caram 30'; Venegas 42'
Penalties
Kidd (penalty shoot-out scored); Judge (penalty shoot-out missed); Bunce (penalty shoot-out scored); Marshall (penalty shoot-out scored); Lloyd (penalty shoot-out missed)	3–2	(penalty shoot-out scored) Infante; (penalty shoot-out missed) Filipek; (penalty shoot-out missed) García; (penalty shoot-out scored) Villagra; (penalty shoot-out missed) Caram

Umpires:
Suzi Sutton (USA)
Stephanie Judefind (USA)

10 March 2013
13:00

Uruguay	4–0	Brazil
Olaso 6', 34'; Bisignano 25', 29'	Report

Umpires:
Mercedes Sanchéz (ARG)
Ana Vásquez (MEX)

== Goalscorers ==
The following goalscorers list comprises players from both events.

There were 258 goals scored in 50 matches, for an average of 5.16 goals per match.

10 goals

- (South Africa) Pietie Coetzee

7 goals

- (India) Rani Rampal

6 goals

- (Belgium) Stéphanie de Groof
- (India) Jaspreet Kaur

5 goals

- (Chile) Camila Caram
- (Japan) Shiho Sakai
- (Scotland) Nikki Kidd
- (South Africa) Dirkie Chamberlain

4 goals

- (Italy) Alessia Padalino
- (Kazakhstan) Vera Domashneva
- (Malaysia) Siti Ruhani
- (Russia) Alina Krasnoperova
- (Russia) Ekaterina Shaburova
- (United States) Claire Laubach

3 goals

- (Azerbaijan) Farida Mammadova
- (Belarus) Yuliya Mikheichyk
- (Belarus) Nastassia Syrayezhka
- (Belgium) Erica Coppey
- (Belgium) Hélène Delmée
- (India) Soundarya Yendala
- (Japan) Mazuki Arai
- (Japan) Kumi Banda
- (Japan) Rika Komazawa
- (Japan) Aki Mitsuhashi
- (Japan) Ayaka Nishimura
- (Malaysia) Nadia Rahman
- (Malaysia) Norzalin Sumantri
- (Malaysia) Fazilla Sylvester
- (Russia) Tamara Ivanova
- (Scotland) Alison Bell
- (Scotland) Vikki Bunce
- (Scotland) Linda Clement
- (Spain) Raquel Huertas
- (Spain) Lola Riera
- (United States) Lauren Pfeiffer
- (Uruguay) Karina Bisignano
- (Uruguay) Ana Lucía di María
- (Uruguay) María Isabel Olaso

2 goals

- (Belarus) Ryta Batura
- (Belgium) Jill Boon
- (Chile) Carolina García
- (Chile) Paula Infante
- (Chile) Javiera Villagra
- (India) Roselin Dung Dung
- (India) Vandana Katariya
- (Ireland) Audrey O'Flynn
- (Italy) Agata Wybieralska
- (Japan) Akiko Kato
- (Japan) Yuri Nagai
- (Japan) Miyuki Nakagawa
- (Japan) Akiko Ota
- (Japan) Aya Ueda
- (Malaysia) Siti Othman
- (Russia) Yana Doronina
- (Scotland) Holly Cram
- (Spain) Georgina Oliva
- (Trinidad and Tobago) Blair Wynne
- (United States) Torrie Albini
- (United States) Melissa González
- (United States) Katie O'Donnell
- (United States) Katie Reinprecht
- (United States) Emily Wold

1 goal

- (Austria) Rafaela Rubas
- (Austria) Denise Turek
- (Austria) Corinna Zerbs
- (Azerbaijan) Khatira Aliyeva
- (Azerbaijan) Lyubov Druzhinina
- (Azerbaijan) Yuliya Muradi
- (Belarus) Alesia Piotukh
- (Belarus) Krestina Kulinkovich
- (Belarus) Natallia Stsifutkina
- (Belarus) Hanna Zabrotskaya
- (Belgium) Charlotte de Vos
- (Belgium) Alix Gerniers
- (Belgium) Barbara Nelen
- (Belgium) Emilie Sinia
- (Brazil) Patricia Boos
- (Brazil) Thalita Cabral
- (Chile) Andrea Greene
- (Chile) Mariana Lagos
- (Chile) Agustina Venegas
- (Chile) Josefa Villalabeitia
- (Chile) Sofía Walbaum
- (Czech Republic) Adéla Bižová
- (Czech Republic) Monika Košťálová
- (Ghana) Nkansah Tenkorang
- (India) Anupa Barla
- (India) Navjot Kaur
- (India) Chanchan Devi Thokchom
- (India) Namita Toppo
- (Ireland) Aine Connery
- (Ireland) Nicola Gray
- (Ireland) Lisa Jacob
- (Italy) Ana Laura Bertarini
- (Italy) Agustina di Bernardo
- (Italy) Dalila Mirabella
- (Italy) Elisabetta Pacella
- (Italy) Giuliana Ruggieri
- (Italy) Chiara Tiddi
- (Japan) Sachimi Iwao
- (Kazakhstan) Natalya Gataulina
- (Kazakhstan) Gulnara Imangaliyeva
- (Malaysia) Noor Hasliza Ali
- (Malaysia) Juliani Din
- (Malaysia) Norhasikin Halim
- (Russia) Margarita Drepenkina
- (Russia) Kristina Shumilina
- (Russia) Evgenia Sorokina
- (Russia) Kseniia Svezhentseva
- (Russia) Daria Vasileva
- (Russia) Alexandra Zhashkova
- (Scotland) Aileen Davis
- (Scotland) Catriona Ralph
- (South Africa) Tarryn Bright
- (South Africa) Bernadette Coston
- (South Africa) Jade Mayne
- (Spain) Eugenia Guajardo
- (Spain) Beatriz Pérez
- (Spain) María Romagosa
- (Spain) Rocío Ybarra
- (Trinidad and Tobago) Avion Ashton
- (Trinidad and Tobago) Krizia Layne
- (United States) Jill Witmer
- (Uruguay) Lucía Lamberti
- (Uruguay) Janine Stanley
- (Uruguay) Soledad Villar

1 own goal

- Kazakhstan (against Japan)

Source: Cape Town New Delhi Rio de Janeiro Valencia

TTO USA URU
