= 2012 Women's Hockey Champions Challenge I =

International field hockey tournament

2012 Women's FIH Champions Challenge I
Tournament details
- Host country: Ireland
- City: Dublin
- Teams: 8
- Venue: University College Dublin

Final positions
- Champions: Australia (1st title)
- Runner-up: United States
- Third place: Ireland

Tournament statistics
- Matches played: 24
- Goals scored: 99 (4.13 per match)
- Top scorer: (Australia) Jodie Schulz (6 goals)
- Best player: (United States) Katie O'Donnell

The 2012 Women's Hockey Champions Challenge I was the 7th edition of the field hockey championship for women. It was held from 29 September to 7 October 2012 in Dublin, Ireland. The tournament doubled as the qualifier to the 2014 Women's Hockey Champions Trophy to be held in Argentina as the winner earned an automatic berth to compete.

Australia won the tournament for the first time after defeating the United States 6 – 1 in the final, earning an automatic berth at the 2014 Women's Hockey Champions Trophy after their absence in the previous edition.

== Qualification ==
The following eight teams announced by the FIH competed in this tournament.

- Ireland (Host nation)
- Australia (Sixth in 2011 Champions Trophy)
- Belgium (Winners of 2011 Champions Challenge II)
- United States (Second in 2011 Champions Challenge I)
- Scotland (Third in 2011 Champions Challenge I)
- South Africa (Fifth in 2011 Champions Challenge I)
- India (Seventh in 2011 Champions Challenge I)
- Wales

== Results ==
All times are Irish Standard Time (UTC+01:00)

=== First round ===
==== Pool A ====
Pos	Team	Pld	W	D	L	GF	GA	GD	Pts
1	Australia	3	3	0	0	16	2	+14	9
2	Belgium	3	2	0	1	8	8	0	6
3	India	3	1	0	2	6	11	−5	3
4	Wales	3	0	0	3	2	11	−9	0

Source: FIH
Rules for classification: 1) points; 2) goal difference; 3) goals scored; 4) head-to-head result.

29 September 2012
10:00

India	3–0	Wales
Rani 18'; Mayengbam 70'; Yendala Soundarya 70'	Report

Umpires:
Carol Metchette (IRL)
Maggie Giddens (USA)

29 September 2012
12:30

Australia	4–1	Belgium
Schulz 20'; Eastham 26'; Flanagan 47'; Blyth 67'	Report	Sinia 54'

Umpires:
Lesley Pieterse (RSA)
Hannah Sanders (ENG)

30 September 2012
10:30

Belgium	4–2	Wales
de Groof 3', 4'; 29'; Boon 39'	Report	Richards 37'; Marke 57'

Umpires:
Valentina Tomasi (ITA)
Emi Yamada (JPN)

30 September 2012
13:00

India	1–8	Australia
Rani 18'	Report	Blyth 3', 57'; Eastham 21'; Schulz 24', 70'; Messent 50'; Nanscawen 64'; Hurtz 68'

Umpires:
Fanneke Alkemade (NED)
Mariana Reydo (ARG)

2 October 2012
11:00

Belgium	3–2	India
Coppey 33' de Groof 63'; Gerniers 70'	Report	Dungdung 1'; 14'

Umpires:
Mariana Reydo (ARG)
Hannah Sanders (ENG)

2 October 2012
13:30

Australia	4–0	Wales
Hurtz 1', 68', 70'; Smith 38'	Report

Umpires:
Lesley Pieterse (RSA)
Emi Yamada (JPN)

==== Pool B ====
Pos	Team	Pld	W	D	L	GF	GA	GD	Pts
1	United States	3	2	0	1	7	4	+3	6
2	Scotland	3	1	2	0	2	1	+1	5
3	Ireland	3	1	1	1	3	4	−1	4
4	South Africa	3	0	1	2	2	5	−3	1

Source: FIH
Rules for classification: 1) points; 2) goal difference; 3) goals scored; 4) head-to-head result.

29 September 2012
15:00

South Africa	0–1	Ireland
	Report	Watkins 52'

Umpires:
Michelle Meister (GER)
Emi Yamada (JPN)

29 September 2012
17:30

United States	0–1	Scotland
	Report	Robertson 25'

Umpires:
Mariana Reydo (ARG)
Valentina Tomasi (ITA)

30 September 2012
15:30

Ireland	1–1	Scotland
Mullan 59'	Report	Ralph 35'

Umpires:
Lesley Pieterse (RSA)
Maggie Giddens (USA)

30 September 2012
18:00

United States	4–2	South Africa
O'Donnell 20', 59'; 53'; Albini 68'	Report	Terblanche 24'; Lategan 34'

Umpires:
Michelle Meister (GER)
Carol Metchette (IRL)

2 October 2012
16:00

South Africa	0–0	Scotland
	Report

Umpires:
Valentina Tomasi (ITA)
Carol Metchette (IRL)

2 October 2012
18:30

Ireland	1–3	United States
Atcheler 7'	Report	Taylor 48'; Pfeiffer 55'; Crandall 68'

Umpires:
Fanneke Alkemade (NED)
Michelle Meister (GER)

=== Second round ===
Quarterfinals
4 October 2012
Australia	2
South Africa	1
4 October 2012
Scotland (p.s.o.)	1 (3)
India	1 (1)
4 October 2012
Belgium	1
Ireland (a.e.t.)	2
4 October 2012
United States	7
Wales	2

Semi-finals
6 October 2012
Australia	2
Scotland	0
6 October 2012
Ireland	1
United States	2

Final
7 October 2012
Australia	6
United States	1
Third place match
7 October 2012
Scotland	2 (3)
Ireland (p.s.o.)	2 (4)

==== Quarterfinals ====
4 October 2012
10:30

Scotland	1–1 (a.e.t.)	India
Judge 58'	Report	Ja. Kaur 41'
Penalties
Kidd (penalty shoot-out missed); Judge (penalty shoot-out scored); Bunce (penalty shoot-out scored); Lloyd (penalty shoot-out missed); Marshall (penalty shoot-out scored)	3–1	(penalty shoot-out scored) Thokchom; (penalty shoot-out missed) Rani; (penalty shoot-out missed) Yendala; (penalty shoot-out missed) Kataria

Umpires:
Michelle Meister (GER)
Emi Yamada (JPN)

4 October 2012
13:00

United States	7–2	Wales
O'Donnell 10'; Albini 19', 57'; Taylor 24', 46'; Pfeiffer 49', 53'	Report	Evans 31'; Richards 65'

Umpires:
Carol Matchette (IRL)
Fanneke Alkemade (NED)

4 October 2012
15:30

Australia	2–1	South Africa
Flanagan 11'; Smith 66'	Report	Damons 18'

Umpires:
Maggie Giddens (USA)
Valentina Tomasi (ITA)

4 October 2012
18:00

Belgium	1–2 (a.e.t.)	Ireland
Raes 63'	Report	Connery 50'; O'Flynn 85'

Umpires:
Lesley Pieterse (RSA)
Hannah Sanders (ENG)

==== Fifth to eighth place classification ====
Crossover
6 October 2010
South Africa (a.e.t.)	3
India	2
6 October 2010
Belgium	8
Wales	0

Fifth place match
7 October 2010
South Africa	1
Belgium	2
Seventh place match
7 October 2010
India	4
Wales	0

===== Crossover =====
6 October 2012
10:00

South Africa	3–2 (a.e.t.)	India
Lategan 4', 6', 72'	Report	Rani 22'; Barla 67'

Umpires:
Hannah Sanders (ENG)
Carol Metchette (IRL)

6 October 2012
12:30

Belgium	8–0	Wales
Sinia 4', 44'; De Groof 19', 42'; Leclef 33'; 38'; Gerniers 51', 58'	Report

Umpires:
Maggie Giddens (USA)
Fanneke Alkemade (NED)

===== Seventh and eighth place =====
7 October 2012
09:00

India	4–0	Wales
Poonam 7'; Barla 27'; Rani 29'; Mayengbam 47'	Report

Umpires:
Valentina Tomasi (ITA)
Maggie Giddens (USA)

===== Fifth and sixth place =====
7 October 2012
11:30

South Africa	1–2	Belgium
Bright 70'	Report	Coppey 50'; Gerniers 55'

Umpires:
Michelle Meister (GER)
Hannah Sanders (ENG)

==== First to fourth place classification ====
===== Semifinals =====
6 October 2012
15:00

Australia	2–0	Scotland
Schulz 52'; Flanagan 56'	Report

Umpires:
Emi Yamada (JPN)
Lesley Pieterse (RSA)

6 October 2012
17:30

Ireland	1–2	United States
Jacob 3'	Report	O'Donnell 37'; Pfeiffer 59'

Umpires:
Mariana Reydo (ARG)
Michelle Meister (GER)

===== Third and fourth place =====
7 October 2012
14:00

Scotland	2–2 (a.e.t.)	Ireland
Bell 5'; Judge 39'	Report	Smyth 17'; Atcheler 66'
Penalties
Kidd (penalty shoot-out scored); Judge (penalty shoot-out scored); Bunce (penalty shoot-out scored); Wyllie (penalty shoot-out missed); Marshall (penalty shoot-out missed)	3–4	(penalty shoot-out scored) Smyth; (penalty shoot-out scored) Harvey; (penalty shoot-out missed) Jacob; (penalty shoot-out scored) Watkins; (penalty shoot-out scored) Symmons

Umpires:
Lesley Pieterse (RSA)
Fanneke Alkemade (NED)

===== Final =====
7 October 2012
16:30

Australia	6–1	United States
Close 17', 32'; Nanscawen 24'; Smith 39'; Schulz 59', 68'	Report	Dawson 4'

Umpires:
Carol Metchette (IRL)
Mariana Reydo (ARG)

== Awards ==
The following awards were presented at the conclusion of the tournament:

Player of the Tournament	Top Goalscorer
(United States) Katie O'Donnell	(Australia) Jodie Schulz

== Statistics ==
=== Final ranking ===
As per statistical convention in field hockey, matches decided in extra time are counted as wins and losses, while matches decided by penalty shoot-outs are counted as draws.

Pos	Team	Pld	W	D	L	GF	GA	GD	Pts	Status
1st place, gold medalist(s)	Australia	6	6	0	0	26	4	+22	18	Qualified for 2014 Champions Trophy
2nd place, silver medalist(s)	United States	6	4	0	2	17	13	+4	12	
3rd place, bronze medalist(s)	Ireland	6	2	2	2	8	9	−1	8	
4	Scotland	6	1	4	1	5	6	−1	7	
5	Belgium	6	4	0	2	19	11	+8	12	
6	South Africa	6	1	1	4	7	11	−4	4	
7	India	6	2	1	3	13	15	−2	7	
8	Wales	6	0	0	6	4	30	−26	0	

Source: FIH

=== Goalscorers ===
There were 99 goals scored in 24 matches, for an average of 4.12 goals per match.

6 goals

- (Australia) Jodie Schulz

5 goals

- (Belgium) Stephanie De Groof

4 goals

- (Australia) Emily Hurtz
- (Belgium) Alix Gerniers
- (India) Ritu Rani
- (South Africa) Izelle Lategan
- (United States) Katie O'Donnell
- (United States) Lauren Pfeiffer

3 goals

- (Australia) Madonna Blyth
- (Australia) Anna Flanagan
- (Australia) Emily Smith
- (Belgium) Emilie Sinia
- (United States) Torrie Albini
- (United States) Shannon Taylor

2 goals

- (Australia) Jade Close
- (Australia) Casey Eastham
- (Australia) Georgia Nanscawen
- (Belgium) Erica Coppey
- (India) Anupa Barla
- (India) Lily Mayengbam
- (Ireland) Niamh Atcheler
- (Scotland) Samantha Judge
- (Wales) Phoebe Richards

1 goal

- (Australia) Claire Messent
- (Belgium) Jill Boon
- (Belgium) Pauline Leclef
- (Belgium) Anouk Raes
- (India) Roselin Dungdung
- (India) Jaspreet Kaur
- (India) Poonam Rani
- (India) Yendala Soundarya
- (Ireland) Aine Connery
- (Ireland) Lisa Jacob
- (Ireland) Kathryn Mullan
- (Ireland) Audrey O'Flynn
- (Ireland) Emma Smyth
- (Ireland) Chloe Watkins
- (Scotland) Alison Bell
- (Scotland) Catriona Ralph
- (Scotland) Sarah Robertson
- (South Africa) Tarryn Bright
- (South Africa) Sulette Damons
- (South Africa) Nicole Terblanche
- (United States) Lauren Crandall
- (United States) Rachel Dawson
- (Wales) Tina Evans
- (Wales) Natasha Marke

1 own goal

- India (against Belgium)
- United States (against South Africa)

2 own goals

- Belgium (both against Wales)

Source: FIH
