= 2012–13 Women's FIH Hockey World League Round 1 =

Field hockey tournament

The 2012–13 Women's FIH Hockey World League Round 1 was held from August to December 2012. A total of 28 teams competing in 6 events took part in this round of the tournament playing for 15 berths in the Round 2, played in February and March 2013.

== Qualification ==
Each national association member of the International Hockey Federation (FIH) had the opportunity to compete in the tournament. Teams ranked 17th and lower in the FIH World Rankings current at the time of seeking entries for the competition were allocated to one of the Round 1 events. The following 28 teams, shown with final pre-tournament rankings, competed in this round of the tournament.

- Austria (28)
- Barbados (41)
- Belarus (21)
- Belgium (14)
- Canada (23)
- Czech Republic (37)
- Fiji (59)
- France (25)
- Ghana (31)
- Guyana (58)
- Italy (17)
- Kazakhstan (33)
- Lithuania (34)
- Malaysia (22)
- Nigeria (54)
- Papua New Guinea (61)
- Russia (20)
- Samoa (60)
- Scotland (19)
- Singapore (49)
- Sri Lanka (53)
- Trinidad and Tobago (29)
- Turkey (42)
- Ukraine (24)
- Uruguay (50)
- Vanuatu
- Venezuela (58)
- Wales (27)

== Prague ==
- Prague, Czech Republic, 17–19 August 2012.

=== Pool ===
All times are Central European Summer Time (UTC+02:00)

Team	Pld	W	D	L	GF	GA	GD	Pts
Belarus (A)	5	4	0	1	33	7	+26	12
Italy (A)	5	4	0	1	25	2	+23	12
Scotland (A)	5	4	0	1	23	5	+18	12
Czech Republic (A)	5	2	0	3	17	16	+1	6
France	5	1	0	4	4	25	−21	3
Turkey	5	0	0	5	3	50	−47	0

(A) Advanced to Round 2

14 August 2012
12:30

Scotland	12–1	Turkey
Ralph 12', 32'; Davis 14'; Judge 18', 31', 45'; Bell 20', 54'; Kidd 52'; Lloyd 55'; Fawcett 58'; Cram 61'	Report	Öztürk 49'

Umpires:
Pllar Lopez (ESP)
Veronika Pekhtsiarova (BLR)

14 August 2012
14:45

Belarus	9–1	France
Shcharbakova 9', 42'; Silitskaya 11', 41', 69'; Kurhanskaya 15'; Zhylianina 24'; Stsifutkina 34'; Mikheichyk 51'	Report	Padilla 44'

Umpires:
Alex Walker (SCO)
Helena Babicka (CZE)

14 August 2012
17:00

Italy	6–0	Czech Republic
Braconi 30', 48'; Tiddi 44'; Wybieřalska 46'; Ruggieri 51'; G. Pacella 70'	Report

Umpires:
Marine de Witte (BEL)
Karine Pereira (FRA)

15 August 2012
12:30

Turkey	0–17	Belarus
	Report	Piotukh 6'; Mikheichyk 9', 14', 38', 40', 41', 43', 45', 56'; Kurhanskaya 10'; Zabrotskaya 22'; Pakhanava 28'; Kulinkovich 48', 57', 60', 65'

Umpires:
Valentina Monni (ITA)
Helena Babicka (CZE)

15 August 2012
14:45

Italy	6–0	France
Lovagnini 27'; E. Pacella 31', 53'; Wybieřalska 40'; Ruggieri 51'; Braconi 53'	Report

Umpires:
Pilar Lopez (ESP)
Alex Walker (SCO)

15 August 2012
17:00

Scotland	5–1	Czech Republic
Ralph 8', 12', 51'; Kidd 19'; Wyllie 20'	Report	Bížová 69'

Umpires:
Karine Pereira (FRA)
Arison Keogh (IRL)

16 August 2012
12:30

Turkey	0–10	Italy
	Report	Wybieřalska 2', 15'; Ruggieri 21'; G. Pacella 22'; Lovagnini 35', 63'; E. Pacella 42'; Bertarini 62'; Di Mauro 66'; Galligani 69'

Umpires:
Karine Pereira (FRA)
Veranika Pekshtiarova (BLR)

16 August 2012
14:45

Belarus	1–2	Scotland
Kurhanskaya 21'	Report	Bell 12'; Ralph 65'

Umpires:
Marine de Witte (BEL)
Pilar Lopez (ESP)

16 August 2012
17:00

France	1–5	Czech Republic
Magner 16'	Report	Haklová 1'; Meizlíková 3'; Brtvová 31', 56'; Laciná 69'

Umpires:
Alex Walker (SCO)
Alison Keogh (IRL)

18 August 2012
08:00

France	2–1	Turkey
Perrocheau 17', 41'	Report	Kücükkoc 10'

Umpires:
Allison Keigh (IRL)
Valentina Monni (ITA)

18 August 2012
10:15

Italy	2–0	Scotland
G. Pacella 63'; E. Pacella 70'	Report

Umpires:
Pilar Lopez (ESP)
Helena Babicka (CZE)

18 August 2012
12:30

Czech Republic	2–4	Belarus
Reinosová 48'; Brtvová 62'	Report	Mikheichyk 22', 65'; Halinouskaya 34', 37'

Umpires:
Marine de Witte (BEL)
Alex Walker (SCO)

19 August 2012
08:00

Scotland	4–0	France
Cram 16', 43'; Kidd 38'; Judge 60'	Report

Umpires:
Allison Keogh (IEL)
Helena Babicka (CZE)

19 August 2012
10:15

Belarus	2–1	Italy
Kulinkovich 45'; Halinouskava 61'	Report	Wybieřalska 31'

Umpires:
Karine Pereira (FRA)
Marine de Witte (BEL)

19 August 2012
12:30

Czech Republic	9–0	Turkey
Haklová 4', 6', 40'; Brtvová 19'; Bížová 28', 33'; Trčková 45'; Reinosová 49'; Laciná 63'	Report

Umpires:
Valentina Monni (ITA)
Veranika Pskshtiarova (BLR)

=== Awards ===
- Best Player: (Italy) Chiara Tiddi
- Fair Play: France

== Accra ==
- Accra, Ghana, 7–9 September 2012.

=== Pool ===
All times are Greenwich Mean Time (UTC±00:00)

Team	Pld	W	D	L	GF	GA	GD	Pts
Ghana (A)	3	3	0	0	8	3	+5	9
Nigeria	3	0	0	3	3	8	−5	0

(A) Advanced to Round 2

7 September 2012
16:00

Ghana	2–0	Nigeria
Sasu 40'; Tenkorang 42'	Report

Umpires:
Faith Baya (NIG)
Hagar Laryea (GHA)

8 September 2012
16:00

Nigeria	1–2	Ghana
Nnanna 30'	Report	Inatimi 32'; Ebitimi 44'

Umpires:
Hagar Laryea (GHA)
Faith Baya (NIG)

9 September 2012
14:00

Ghana	4–2	Nigeria
Sasu 12'; Opoku 16', 58'; Bamfo 20'	Report	Onyedum 27', 35'

Umpires:
Faith Baya (NIG)
Hagar Laryea (GHA)

== Kuantan ==
- Kuantan, Malaysia, 14–16 September 2012.

=== Pool ===
All times are Malaysian Standard Time (UTC+08:00)

Team	Pld	W	D	L	GF	GA	GD	Pts
Malaysia (A)	3	3	0	0	31	1	+30	9
Kazakhstan (A)	3	2	0	1	12	13	−1	6
Sri Lanka	3	1	0	2	4	17	−13	3
Singapore	3	0	0	3	3	19	−16	0

(A) Advanced to Round 2

14 September 2012
16:00

Kazakhstan	6–1	Sri Lanka
Domashneva 4', 6'; Imangaliyeva 8', 21', 66'; Sazontova 70'	Report	Perera 23'

Umpires:
Nur Hafizah Azman (MAS)
Miskarmalia Ariffin (SIN)

14 September 2012
18:15

Malaysia	11–0	Singapore
Othman 5', 24', 58'; Arumugam 14', 53'; Rokhari 15', 35'; Silin 47', 67'; Ruhani 61'; Mohamad Din 69'	Report

Umpires:
Nirmala Sagar (IND)
Ornpimol Kittiteersopon (THA)

15 September 2012
16:00

Singapore	2–3	Sri Lanka
Gofar 15', 34'	Report	Gunarathna 44', 35'; 51'

Umpires:
Nur Hafizah Azman (MAS)
Nirmala Sagar (IND)

15 September 2012
18:00

Kazakhstan	1–11	Malaysia
Imangaliyeva 59'	Report	Rahman 2', 16'; Silin 6'; Othman 15'; Zaki 18'; Ruhani 22'; Adawiyah 37'; Sumantri 44', 64'; Bokhari 50', 65'

Umpires:
Miskarmalia Ariffin (SIN)
Ornpimol Kittiteersopon (THA)

16 September 2012
16:00

Singapore	1–5	Kazakhstan
O Ming Fen 31'	Report	Imangaliyeva 18', 54'; Gataulina 38', 51'; Domashneva 65'

Umpires:
Nur Hafizah Azman (MAS)
Ornpimol Kittiteersopon (THA)

16 September 2012
18:15

Malaysia	9–0	Sri Lanka
Hashim 2', 37'; Silin 6', 43'; Din 27'; Othman 34'; Ruhani 46'; Bokhari 49'; Arumugam 54'	Report

Umpires:
Nirmala Sagar (IND)
Miskarmalia Ariffin (SIN)

=== Awards ===
- Best Player: (Malaysia) Fazilla Sylvester Silin
- Best Goalkeeper: (Singapore) Cookie Tan Koon Kim
- Top Scorer: (Kazakhstan) Gulnara Imangaliyeva / (Malaysia) Nor Hidayah Bokhari (6 goals)

== Vienna ==
- Vienna, Austria, 18–23 September 2012.

=== Pool ===
All times are Central European Summer Time (UTC+02:00)

Team	Pld	W	SOW	SOL	L	GF	GA	GD	Pts
Belgium (A)	5	5	0	0	0	19	5	+14	15
Russia (A)	5	4	0	0	1	11	7	+4	12
Ukraine (A)	5	3	0	0	2	8	8	0	9
Austria (A)	5	1	1	0	3	5	8	−3	5
Lithuania	5	1	0	1	3	3	12	−9	4
Wales	5	0	0	0	5	1	7	−6	0

(A) Advanced to Round 2

18 September 2012
12:30

Belgium	7–1	Lithuania
Boon 6'; Delmée 10', 22', 51'; Nelen 48', 57' de Groof 69'	Report	Adomavičiūtė 27'

Umpires:
Ana Faias (POR)
Natalia Kovaleva (RUS)

18 September 2012
14:45

Ukraine	1–0	Wales
Vynohradova 15'	Report

Umpires:
Dovile Lidaite (LTU)
Marine De Witte (BEL)

18 September 2012
17:00

Russia	2–1	Austria
Shumilina 8'; Sorokina 55'	Report	Busch 64'

Umpires:
Ivona Makar (CRO)
Catherine Oultram (WAL)

19 September 2012
12:30

Lithuania	0–2	Ukraine
	Report	Sadova 9'; Vasyukova 45'

Umpires:
Catherine Oultram (WAL)
Natalia Kovaleva (RUS)

19 September 2012
14:45

Russia	2–0	Wales
Goncharevskaya 5'; Chekhova 35'	Report

Umpires:
Ana Faias (POR)
Violeta Eismayer (AUT)

19 September 2012
17:00

Belgium	2–1	Austria
Vandermeiren 12'; Gerniers 50'	Report	Specjal 13'

Umpires:
Ivona Makar (CRO)
Olena Klymenko (UKR)

20 September 2012
12:30

Lithuania	0–2	Russia
	Report	Sorokina 20'; Shaburova 23'

Umpires:
Marine De Witte (BEL)
Olena Klymenko (UKR)

20 September 2012
14:45

Ukraine	0–4	Belgium
	Report	de Groof 19'; Boon 53'; Nelen 61'; Raes 67'

Umpires:
Catherine Oultram (WAL)
Dovile Lidaite (LTU)

20 September 2012
17:00

Wales	0–1	Austria
	Report	Vukovich 42'

Umpires:
Ivona Makar (CRO)
Natalia Kovaleva (RUS)

22 September 2012
12:30

Russia	2–4	Belgium
Kirianova 21'; Sorokina 66'	Report	de Groof 25', 35', 64'; Coppey 57'

Umpires:
Violeta Eismayer (AUT)
Olena Klymenko (UKR)

22 September 2012
14:45

Wales	0–1	Lithuania
	Report	Grubliauskaite 31'

Umpires:
Marine De Witte (BEL)
Natalia Kovaleva (RUS)

22 September 2012
17:00

Austria	1–3	Ukraine
Vukovich 14'	Report	Vasyukova 6'; Sadova 33'; Khilko 52'

Umpires:
Ana Faias (POR)
Dovile Lidaite (LTU)

23 September 2012
12:30

Belgium	2–1	Wales
Delmée 54' de Groof 56'	Report	Richards 42'

Umpires:
Ivona Makar (CRO)
Dovile Lidaite (LTU)

23 September 2012
14:45

Ukraine	2–3	Russia
Ivakhnenko 37'; Vorushylo 49'	Report	18'; Shaburova 36'; Sorokina 68'

Umpires:
Violeta Eismayer (AUT)
Catherine Oultram (WAL)

23 September 2012
17:00

Austria	1–1	Lithuania
Sandner 11'	Report	Nomeikaite 69'
Penalties
	4–3

Umpires:
Ana Faias (POR)
Olena Klymenko (UKR)

== Port of Spain ==
- Port of Spain, Trinidad and Tobago, 11–17 November 2012.

=== Pool ===
All times are Atlantic Standard Time (UTC−04:00)

Team	Pld	W	SOW	SOL	L	GF	GA	GD	Pts
Canada (A)	5	5	0	0	0	38	0	+38	15
Uruguay (A)	5	4	0	0	1	25	2	+23	12
Trinidad and Tobago (A)	5	3	0	0	2	17	7	+10	9
Venezuela	5	1	1	0	3	4	29	−25	5
Guyana	5	0	1	1	3	3	22	−19	3
Barbados	5	0	0	1	4	2	29	−27	1

(A) Advanced to Round 2

11 November 2012
13:00

Canada	12–0	Venezuela
Karringten 5', 64'; Stairs 11', 19', 47', 61'; Sandhu 28'; Raye 32'; Gillis 38', 70'; Dickinson 53', 55'	Report

Umpires:
Maggie Giddens (USA)
Ayanna McClean (TRI)

11 November 2012
15:00

Trinidad and Tobago	5–0	Guyana
Wynne 18', 27', 58'; Luces 39'; Lewis 61'	Report

Umpires:
Rosario Ardanaz (URU)
Denise Pelletier (CAN)

11 November 2012
17:00

Barbados	0–8	Uruguay
	Report	Bocca 12', 50'; Bisignano 14', 53'; L. De María 18'; Mora 40'; Aishemberg 43'; Viana 44'

Umpires:
Lisa Hernandez (TRI)
Kecia Jones (TRI)

12 November 2012
14:30

Canada	10–0	Guyana
Culley 6'; Haughn 27'; Dickinson 30'; McManus 41'; Stairs 48', 56'; Karringten 51', 64'; Mitchell 54'; Johnston 63'	Report

Umpires:
Lisa Hernandez (TRI)
Ayanna McClean (TRI)

12 November 2012
16:30

Trinidad and Tobago	0–2	Uruguay
	Report	Bocca 33'; Viana 41'

Umpires:
Denise Pelletier (CAN)
Maggie Giddens (USA)

12 November 2012
18:30

Venezuela	2–1	Barbados
Mujica 5'; Mendoza 63'	Report	Wilson 20'

Umpires:
Rosario Ardanaz (URU)
Kecia Jones (TRI)

14 November 2012
09:00

Barbados	0–11	Canada
	Report	McManus 2', 50'; Stairs 8'; Dickinson 13', 26'; Gardiner 14'; Karringten 19', 31'; Mitchell 38'; Sandhu 55'; Gillis 62'

Umpires:
Rosario Ardanaz (URU)
Kecia Jones (TRI)

14 November 2012
11:00

Uruguay	5–1	Guyana
Bisignano 7'; L. De María 11'; Olave 34'; Laborde 46'; Mora 53'	Report	Fiedtkou 62'

Umpires:
Lisa Hernandez (TRI)
Ayanna McClean (TRI)

14 November 2012
13:00

Venezuela	1–5	Trinidad and Tobago
Barrios 64'	Report	Wynne 9', 35' de Gannes 37'; Lewis 40' du Quesnay 51'

Umpires:
Maggie Giddens (USA)
Denise Pelletier (CAN)

15 November 2012
15:00

Guyana	1–1	Barbados
Fernandes 70'	Report	Brewster 20'
Penalties
	3–2

Umpires:
Kecia Jones (TRI)
Denise Pelletier (CAN)

15 November 2012
17:00

Trinidad and Tobago	0–4	Canada
	Report	Culley 14'; Sandhu 28'; Stairs 34'; Karringten 45'

Umpires:
Maggie Giddens (USA)
Rosario Ardanaz (URU)

15 November 2012
19:00

Uruguay	10–0	Venezuela
Coates 17', 24', 36'; Bisignano 19'; Vilar 29'; L. De María 30'; Norbis 35', 59'; Campos 39'; Laborde 41'	Report

Umpires:
Lisa Hernandez (TRI)
Ayanna McClean (TRI)

17 November 2012
10:30

Canada	1–0	Uruguay
Gillis 6'	Report

Umpires:
Ayanna McClean (TRI)
Lisa Hernandez (TRI)

17 November 2012
13:00

Guyana	1–1	Venezuela
Xavier 29'	Report	Sanz 25'
Penalties
	1–2

Umpires:
Kecia Jones (TRI)
Rosario Ardanaz (URU)

17 November 2012
15:00

Barbados	0–7	Trinidad and Tobago
	Report	Wynee 4'; Lewis 22', 63' de Gannes 44'; Layne 54'; Williams 61'; Thompson 69'

Umpires:
Maggie Giddens (USA)
Denise Pelletier (CAN)

== Suva ==
- Suva, Fiji, 8–15 December 2012.

=== Pool ===
All times are Fiji Summer Time (UTC+13:00)

Team	Pld	W	SOW	SOL	L	GF	GA	GD	Pts
Fiji (A)	3	3	0	0	0	43	2	+41	9
Papua New Guinea	3	1	1	0	1	3	12	−9	5
Samoa	3	1	0	1	1	5	15	−10	4
Vanuatu	3	0	0	0	3	2	24	−22	0

(A) Advanced to Round 2

8 December 2012
17:30

Papua New Guinea	0–0	Samoa
	Report
Penalties
	3–0

Umpires:
Fabian Corrie (FIJ)
Rhiannon Murrie (AUS)

9 December 2012
11:00

Fiji	17–1	Vanuatu
Browne 3', 15', 17'; Sogotubu 5', 12', 13', 28'; Dutta 21', 59'; Thaggard 26', 40'; Harman 35', 65'; Nawaqakuta 37', 44', 62'; Fatufago 50'	Report	Sam 60'

Umpires:
Karen Bennett (NZL)
Rhiannon Murrie (AUS)

10 December 2012
14:00

Samoa	4–1	Vanuatu
Malu 10'; Vaeoso 30'; Noaese 46'; Pereira 68'	Report	Kalsong 35'

Umpires:
Danielle Underwood (FIJ)
Simon Pondrilei (PNG)

11 December 2012
15:00

Fiji	12–0	Papua New Guinea
Dutta 1'; Thaggard 5', 9', 47'; Sogotubu 24'; Nawaqakuta 36', 43', 70'; Browne 60', 64', 69'; Nautu 68'	Report

Umpires:
Karen Bennett (NZL)
Leah Ashford (AUS)

12 December 2012
18:00

Papua New Guinea	3–0	Vanuatu
Naron 21'; Lagani 23'; Kiapin 31'	Report

Umpires:
Fabian Corrie (FIJ)
Alex Corrie (FIJ)

13 December 2012
18:00

Fiji	14–1	Samoa
Sogotubu 2', 5', 50'; Nautu 5', 48', 62'; Ravatu 13'; Nawaqakuta 20', 22', 43'; Blake 28', 68'; Browne 40', 53'	Report	8'

Umpires:
Karen Bennett (NZL)
Leah Ashford (AUS)
