= 2015 Women's EuroHockey Championship squads =

This article displays the rosters for the teams competing at the 2015 Women's EuroHockey Nations Championship. Each team had to submit 18 players.

== Pool A ==
=== Netherlands ===
Head Coach: Sjoerd Marijne

1. Joyce Sombroek (GK)
3. Xan de Waard
7. Willemijn Bos
8. Marloes Keetels
9. Carlien Dirkse van den Heuvel
10. Kelly Jonker
11. Maria Verschoor
12. Lidewij Welten
13. Caia van Maasakker
17. Maartje Paumen (C)
18. Naomi van As
19. Ellen Hoog
23. Margot van Geffen
24. Eva de Goede
28. Ginella Zerbo
29. Jacky Schoenaker
30. Anne Veenendaal (GK)
31. Valerie Magis

=== Belgium ===
Head Coach: Pascal Kina

3. Louise Cavenaile
4. Aline Fobe
5. Stephanie de Groof
6. Anouk Raes
7. Judith Vandermeiren
8. Emma Puvrez
9. Lieselotte van Lindt (C)
10. Megane Simons (GK)
11. Joanne Peeters
13. Alix Gerniers
14. Emilie Sinia
16. Louise Versavel
19. Barbara Nelen
21. Aisling D'Hooghe (GK)
22. Stephanie Vanden Borre
24. Manon Simons
26. Caroline Wagemans
27. Jill Boon

=== Spain ===
Head Coach: Adrian Lock

1. María López (GK)
3. Rocio Ybarra (C)
5. Rocío Gutiérrez
6. Julia Pons
7. Carlota Petchamé
8. Carola Salvatella
9. María López
10. Berta Bonastre
11. Cristina Guinea
13. Alicia Magaz
14. María Tost
16. María Ruiz (GK)
17. Lola Riera
19. Patricia Maraña
20. Xantal Giné
21. Beatriz Pérez
22. Gloria Comerma
23. Georgina Oliva

=== Poland ===
Head Coach: Krzysztof Rachwalski

1. Dominika Nowicka (GK)
2. Malgorzata Sztybrych
3. Paulina Okaj
4. Amelia Katerla
5. Magdalena Szczurek
6. Joanna Hawrot
7. Magdalena Zagajska
8. Joanna Wieloch
9. Martyna Wypijewska
11. Weronika Wessolowska
15. Paula Slawinska
16. Marlena Rybacha (C)
17. Monika Polewczak
18. Natalia Wisniewska
19. Oriana Walasek
20. Adrianna Marchinkowska
21. Marta Kucharska (GK)
23. Marta Kruszynski

== Pool B ==
=== England ===
Head Coach: Danny Kerry

1. Maddie Hinch (GK)
4. Laura Unsworth
6. Hannah Macleod
7. Georgie Twigg
8. Helen Richardson-Walsh
9. Susannah Townsend
10. Susie Gilbert
11. Kate Richardson-Walsh (C)
13. Sam Quek
15. Alex Danson
18. Giselle Ansley
19. Sophie Bray
20. Hollie Webb
22. Ashleigh Ball
24. Shona McCallin
25. Sabbie Heesh (GK)
26. Lily Owsley
28. Nicola White

=== Germany ===
Head Coach: Jamilon Mülders

1. Yvonne Frank (GK)
5. Selin Oruz
6. Luisa Steindor (C)
8. Anne Schröder
9. Kristina Hillmann
10. Nina Hasselmann
12. Charlotte Stapenhorst
14. Janne Müller-Wieland
15. Hannah Krüger
17. Jana Teschke
18. Lisa Altenburg
21. Franzisca Hauke
22. Lea Stöckel
23. Marie Mävers
27. Cécile Pieper
30. Eileen Hoffmann
31. Lydia Haase
32. Kristina Reynolds (GK)

=== Scotland ===
Head Coach: Gordon Shepherd

2. Nicki Cochrane (GK)
3. Vikki Bunce
6. Becky Ward
7. Amy Brodie
10. Sarah Robertson
13. Aileen Davis
14. Kareena Marshall
15. Leigh Fawcett (C)
16. Rebecca Merchant
17. Nikki Kidd
18. Susan McGilveray
19. Nikki Lloyd
21. Alison Howie
22. Nicola Skrastin
23. Emily Maguire
24. Fiona Bruce
29. Amy Gibson (GK)
30. Louise Campbell

=== Italy ===
Head Coach: Fernando Ferrara

1. Natalia Schinoni (GK)
2. Celina Traverso
3. Maria Galli
5. Constanza Aguirre
6. Florencia Nogueira
7. Valentina Braconi
8. Macarena Ronsisvalli
9. Maria Garraffo
10. Dalila Mirabella
12. Martina Chirico (GK)
14. Elisabetta Pacella
15. María Socino
16. Martina Lecchini
17. Chiara Tiddi (C)
18. Aldana Lovagnini
19. Eleonora di Mauro
25. Giuliana Ruggieri
32. Marcela Casale
