= Hockey at the 2014 Commonwealth Games – Women's team squads =

This article lists the squads of the women's hockey competition at the 2014 Commonwealth Games held in Glasgow, Scotland from 24 July to 3 August 2014.

== Pool A ==
=== Canada ===
The squad was announced on 24 June 2014.

Head coach: (Australia) Ian Rutledge

1. Kaitlyn Williams (GK)
2. Lauren Logush (GK)
3. Katherine Gillis (C)
4. Kaelan Watson
8. Jessica Barnett
9. Danielle Hennig
12. Thea Culley
13. Hannah Haughn
14. Karli Johansen
15. Abigail Raye
17. Sara McManus
19. Holly Stewart
20. Kristine Wishart
22. Madeline Secco
23. Brienne Stairs
24. Poonam Sandhu

=== India ===
The squad was announced on 7 July 2014.

Head coach: (Australia) Neil Hawgood

1. Navjot Kaur
3. Deep Grace Ekka
6. Kirandeep Kaur
10. Anuradha Thokchom
11. Savita Punia (GK)
14. Ritu Rani (C)
15. Poonam Rani
16. Vandana Katariya
17. Deepika Thakur
19. Namita Toppo
22. Anupa Barla
23. Jaspreet Kaur
27. Sushila Chanu
28. Rani Rampal
30. Ritusha Arya
31. Lilima Minz

=== New Zealand ===
The squad was announced on 25 June 2014.

Head coach: (Australia) Mark Hager

1. Kayla Whitelock (C)
2. Emily Naylor
3. Krystal Forgesson
4. Olivia Merry
5. Katie Glynn
6. Petrea Webster
8. Sally Rutherford (GK)
13. Samantha Charlton
16. Elizabeth Thompson
17. Sophie Cocks
19. Rhiannon Dennison
22. Gemma Flynn
24. Rose Keddell
27. Jordan Grant
31. Stacey Michelsen
32. Anita Punt

=== South Africa ===
The squad was announced on 17 June 2014.

Head coach: Sheldon Rostron

3. Celia Evans
7. Illse Davids
8. Marsha Cox (C)
10. Shelley Russell
12. Dirkie Chamberlain
13. Lisa-Marié Deetlefs
18. Anelle van Deventer (GK)
19. Lilian du Plessis
20. Nicolene Terblanche
21. Lenise Marais
22. Kathleen Taylor
23. Bernadette Coston
27. Jade Mayne
28. Quanita Bobbs
29. Tarryn Bright
30. Sulette Damons

=== Trinidad and Tobago ===
Head coach: Anthony Marcano

1. Petal Derry (GK)
4. Avion Ashton
5. Kayla Brathwaite
7. Tamia Roach
8. Dana-Lee de Gannes
10. Brittney Hingh
11. Alanna Lewis (C)
14. Zene Henry
17. Brianna Govia
18. Patricia Wright-Alexis
19. Amie Olton
21. Amanda George
23. Savannah de Freitas
25. Elise Olton
28. Stephanie Whiteman
29. Kwylan Jaggassar

== Pool B ==
=== Australia ===
The squad was announced on 24 June 2014.

Head coach: Adam Commens

2. Georgia Nanscawen
3. Brooke Peris
4. Casey Eastham
7. Jodie Kenny
8. Ashleigh Nelson
9. Anna Flanagan
11. Karri McMahon
12. Madonna Blyth (C)
13. Edwina Bone
16. Kellie White
18. Jane Claxton
19. Georgina Parker
21. Jayde Taylor
22. Kate Jenner
26. Emily Smith
27. Rachael Lynch (GK)

=== England ===
The squad was announced on 27 June 2014.

Head coach: Daniel Kerry

1. Madeleine Hinch (GK)
3. Sophie Bray
4. Laura Unsworth
5. Lily Owsley
6. Zoe Shipperley
7. Georgina Twgg
8. Eloise Watton
9. Susannah Townsend
10. Susannah Gilbert
11. Kate Richardson-Walsh (C)
12. Hollie Webb
13. Samantha Quek
14. Nicola White
15. Alexandra Danson
16. Lucy Wood
17. Giselle Ansley

=== Malaysia ===
Head coach: Nasihin Ibrahim

1. Farah Yahya (GK)
4. Nurul Mansur
5. Hasliza Ali
6. Norsharina Shabuddin
7. Siti Ruhani
8. Juliani Din
9. Norbaini Hashim
10. Siti Saad
11. Norazlin Sumantri
14. Nadia Rahman (C)
19. Fazilla Silin
20. Hafiza Zainordin (GK)
23. Rabiatul Mohamed
24. Surizan Awang
25. Fatin Sukri
27. Nuraini Rashid

=== Scotland ===
The squad was announced on 13 June 2014.

Head coach: Gordon Shepherd

3. Victoria Bunce
4. Morag McLellan
5. Alison Bell
6. Rebecca Ward
8. Catriona Ralph
10. Sarah Robertson
12. Linda Clement (C)
13. Ailsa Wyllie
15. Leigh Fawcett
17. Nicola Kidd
18. Susan McGilveray
19. Nicola Lloyd
22. Nicola Skrastin
23. Emily Maguire
24. Aileen Davis
25. Amy Gibson (GK)

=== Wales ===
The squad was announced on 21 May 2014.

Head coach: Amanda Partington

3. Katrin Budd
4. Alys Brooks
6. Sophie Clayton
7. Sian French
8. Sarah Jones
10. Phoebe Richards
11. Abigail Welsford (C)
12. Elie Barnes
15. Elisabeth Bingham
17. Leah Wilkinson
18. Carys Tucker
21. Xenna Hughes
23. Ria Male (GK)
24. Emma Batten
27. Joanne Westwood
28. Danielle Jordan

== See also ==
- Hockey at the 2014 Commonwealth Games – Men's team squads
