= 2014 Women's Hockey Investec Cup =

Tournament details
- Host country: England
- City: London
- Dates: 9–13 July 2014
- Teams: 4
- Venue: Lee Valley Hockey and Tennis Centre

Final positions
- Champions: England (1st title)
- Runner-up: South Africa
- Third place: Scotland

Tournament statistics
- Matches played: 8
- Goals scored: 39 (4.88 per match)
- Top scorer: (England) Alex Danson (4 goals)

The 2014 Women's Hockey Investec Cup was a women's field hockey tournament held at the Lee Valley Hockey and Tennis Centre. It took place between 9–13 July 2014 in London, England. A total of four teams competed for the title.

England won the tournament by defeating South Africa 2–1 in the final. Scotland won the bronze medal by defeating Wales 3–2 in the third and fourth playoff.

== Teams ==
- England
- Scotland
- South Africa
- Wales

== Results ==
=== Pool matches ===
Pos	Team	Pld	W	D	L	GF	GA	GD	Pts	Qualification
1	England	3	3	0	0	12	2	+10	9	Final
2	South Africa	3	2	0	1	11	4	+7	6	Final
3	Scotland	3	1	0	2	6	4	+2	3	Third and fourth place
4	Wales	3	0	0	3	2	21	−19	0	Third and fourth place

Source: FIH
Rules for classification: 1) points; 2) goal difference; 3) goals scored; 4) head-to-head result.

9 July 2014
11:00

Scotland	0–2	South Africa
	Report	Taylor 15', 65'

Umpires:
Hannah Sanders (ENG)
Carol Lewis (WAL)

9 July 2014
13:15

England	8–0	Wales
Danson 2', 60'; Bray 10'; Townsend 25'; Unsworth 29'; Watton 53'; Richardson-Walsh 57'; Ansley 67'	Report

Umpires:
Claire Druijts (NED)
Annelize Rostron (RSA)

10 July 2014
11:00

Wales	0–5	Scotland
	Report	Ralph 21'; Lloyd 49'; Bunce 66', 68'; Wyllie 70'

Umpires:
Hannah Sanders (ENG)
Claire Druijts (NED)

10 July 2014
13:15

South Africa	1–2	England
Davids 47'	Report	Danson 34'; Twigg 61'

Umpires:
Keri Targett (SCO)
Carol Lewis (WAL)

12 July 2014
15:00

South Africa	8–2	Wales
Russell 4'; Evans 10'; Mayne 21'; Davids 26'; Bright 38', 58'; Taylor 42'; Chamberlain 52'	Report	Batten 45'; Laity 70'

Umpires:
Keri Targett (SCO)
Hannah Sanders (ENG)

12 July 2014
17:15

England	2–1	Scotland
Danson 23'; Watton 37'	Report	Kidd 49'

Umpires:
Claire Druijts (NED)
Annelize Rostron (RSA)

=== Classification matches ===
==== Third and fourth place ====
13 July 2014
12:15

Scotland	3–2	Wales
Lloyd 12'; Bunce 31'; Bell 46'	Report	Richards 55'; Batten 70'

Umpires:
Claire Druijts (NED)
Annelize Rostron (RSA)

==== Final ====
13 July 2014
17:15

England	2–1	South Africa
White 3'; Quek 65'	Report	Mayne 16'

Umpires:
Carol Lewis (WAL)
Keri Targett (SCO)

== Statistics ==
=== Final standings ===
Pos	Team	Pld	W	D	L	GF	GA	GD	Pts	Final Result
1st place, gold medalist(s)	England	4	4	0	0	14	3	+11	12	Gold Medal
2nd place, silver medalist(s)	South Africa	4	2	0	2	12	6	+6	6	Silver Medal
3rd place, bronze medalist(s)	Scotland	4	2	0	2	9	6	+3	6	Bronze Medal
4	Wales	4	0	0	4	4	24	−20	0	Fourth Place

Source: englandhockey

=== Goalscorers ===
4 Goals

- (England) Alex Danson

3 Goals

- (Scotland) Vikki Bunce
- (South Africa) Kathleen Taylor

2 Goals

- (England) Ellie Watton
- (Scotland) Nikki Lloyd
- (South Africa) Tarryn Bright
- (South Africa) Illse Davids
- (South Africa) Jade Mayne
- (Wales) Emma Batten

1 Goal

- (England) Giselle Ansley
- (England) Sophie Bray
- (England) Sam Quek
- (England) Kate Richardson-Walsh
- (England) Susannah Townsend
- (England) Georgie Twigg
- (England) Laura Unsworth
- (England) Nicola White
- (Scotland) Ali Bell
- (Scotland) Nikki Kidd
- (Scotland) Catriona Ralph
- (Scotland) Ailsa Wyllie
- (South Africa) Dirkie Chamberlain
- (South Africa) Celia Evans
- (South Africa) Shelley Russell
- (Wales) Eloise Laity
- (Wales) Phoebe Richards
