= 2014 Women's Hockey Champions Trophy =

Field hockey tournament

Tournament details
- Host country: Argentina
- City: Mendoza
- Dates: 29 November – 7 December
- Teams: 8
- Venue: Estadio Mendocino de Hockey

Final positions
- Champions: Argentina (6th title)
- Runner-up: Australia
- Third place: Netherlands

Tournament statistics
- Matches played: 24
- Goals scored: 72 (3 per match)
- Top scorer(s): (Argentina) Carla Rebecchi (Australia) Jodie Kenny (5 goals)
- Best player: (Argentina) Luciana Aymar

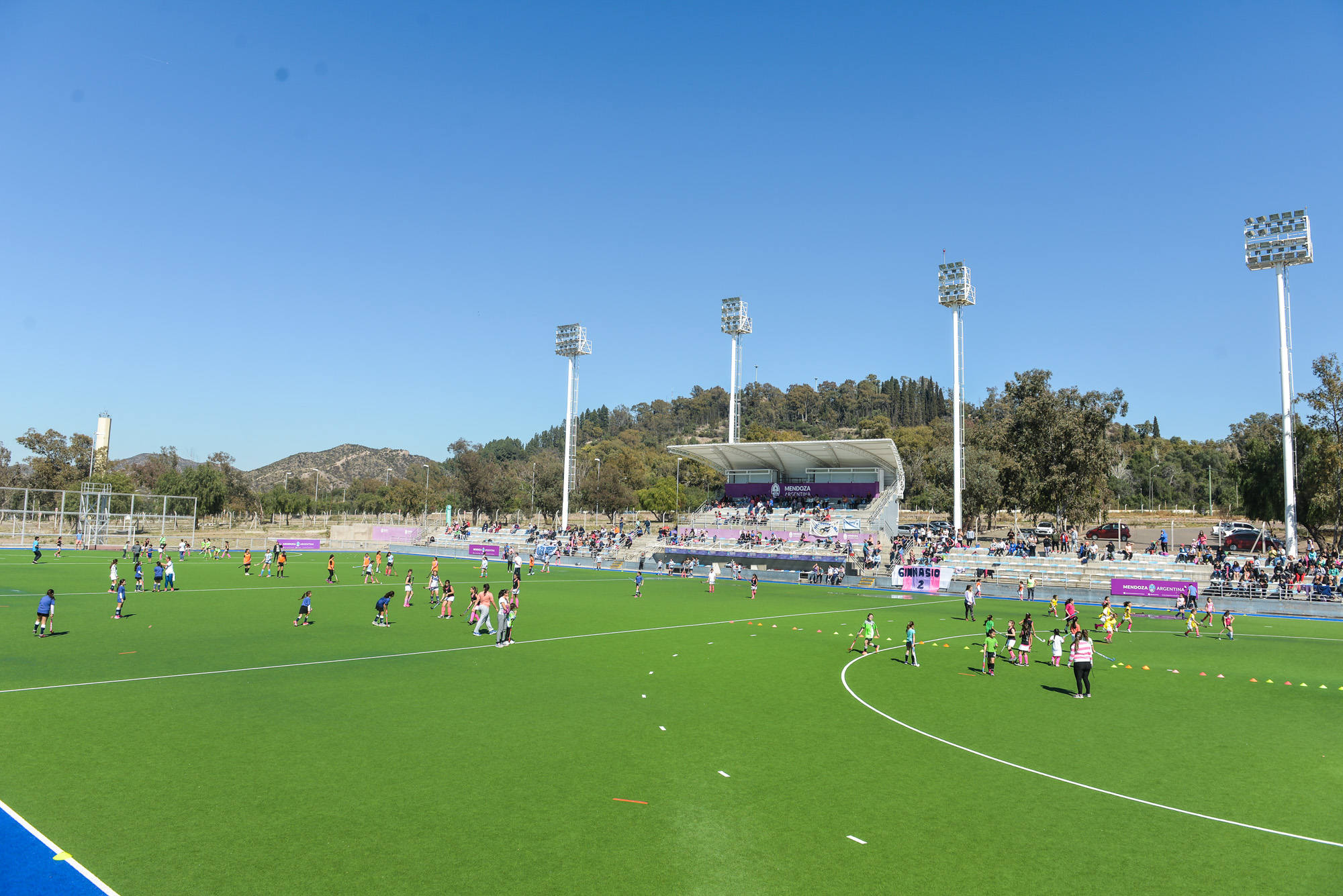
Estadio Mendocino de Hockey, venue

The 2014 Women's Hockey Champions Trophy was the 21st edition of the Hockey Champions Trophy for women. It was held from 29 November to 7 December 2014 in Mendoza, Argentina. From this year on the tournament began to be held biennially due to the introduction of the Hockey World League, returning to its original format changed in 1999.

Argentina won the tournament for the sixth time after defeating Australia 3–1 in the final on a penalty shoot-out after a 1–1 draw, tying the record of six titles previously set by Australia and the Netherlands in 2003 and 2011 respectively. The Netherlands won the third place match by defeating New Zealand 2–1.

== Qualification ==
Alongside as the host nation, the top five finishers from the previous edition and the winner of the 2012 Champions Challenge I qualified automatically. The remaining spots were nominated by the FIH Executive Board, making a total of 8 competing teams. If one of the teams refused to play, that place would be awarded to the next best finisher in the previous tournament, the same applies to the teams nominated by the Executive Board.

Dates	Event	Location	Quotas	Qualifiers
–	Host Nation		1	Argentina
28 January – 5 February 2012	2012 FIH Champions Trophy	Rosario, Argentina	4	England; Germany; Japan; Netherlands
29 September – 7 October 2012	2012 FIH Champions Challenge I	Dublin, Ireland	1	Australia
21 March 2013	Nominated by FIH Executive Board		2	China; New Zealand
Total			8	

== Umpires ==
Below are the 10 umpires appointed by the International Hockey Federation:

- Fanneke Alkemade (NED)
- Kelly Hudson (NZL)
- Stephanie Judefind (USA)
- Mariana Reydo (ARG)
- Lisa Roach (AUS)
- Annelize Rostron (RSA)
- Mercedes Sánchez (ARG)
- Kylie Seymour (AUS)
- Chieko Soma (JPN)
- Sarah Wilson (SCO)

== Squads ==
Argentina

Head coach: Santiago Capurro

1. Belén Succi (GK)
4. Rosario Luchetti
5. Macarena Rodríguez (C)
6. Jimena Cedrés
7. Martina Cavallero
8. Luciana Aymar
11. Carla Rebecchi
12. Delfina Merino
13. María Aladro (GK)
14. Agustina Habif
16. Florencia Habif
17. Rocío Sánchez Moccia
21. Mariela Scarone
24. Pilar Romang
25. Silvina D'Elía
27. Noel Barrionuevo
29. Julia Gomes Fantasia
30. Josefina Sruoga
Australia

Head coach: Adam Commens

1. Gabrielle Nance
2. Georgia Nanscawen
3. Brooke Peris
4. Casey Eastham (C)
5. Ashlee Wells (GK)
6. Kirstin Dwyer
7. Jodie Kenny
8. Ashleigh Nelson
9. Anna Flanagan
10. Rebecca Dwyer
11. Karri McMahon
13. Edwina Bone
15. Amelia Spence
20. Kathryn Slattery
26. Emily Smith
28. Mathilda Carmichael
29. Teneal Attard
32. Audrey Smith (GK)
China

Head coach: (South Korea) Cho Myung-jun

1. Li Dongxiao (GK)
2. Wang Mengyu
5. Xu Xiaoxu
7. Cui Qiuxia (C)
8. Wu Mengrong
9. Xi Xiayun
10. Peng Yang
11. Liang Meiyu
12. Wang Na
15. Yan Yan
19. Zhang Xiaoxue
23. Liu Pan
25. Gu Bingfeng
26. Jiang Ailin
27. Yu Qian
28. Li Jiaqi
30. Guo Jiajia (GK)
32. Bao Qianqian
England

Head coach: Daniel Kerry

1. Madeleine Hinch (GK)
2. Kirsty MacKay (GK)
4. Laura Unsworth
5. Sarah Haycroft
6. Hannah Macleod
7. Georgina Twigg
9. Susannah Townsend
10. Susannah Gilbert
13. Samantha Quek
14. Joanna Leigh
15. Alexandra Danson (C)
18. Giselle Ansley
19. Sophie Bray
20. Hollie Webb
21. Eloise Watton
24. Shona McCallin
26. Lily Owsley
27. Zoe Shipperley
Germany

Head coach: Jamilon Mülders

1. Yvonne Frank (GK)
5. Anne Schröder
6. Luisa Steindor
9. Kristina Hillmann
10. Nina Hasselmann
13. Katharina Otte
15. Hannah Krüger
16. Nike Lorenz
18. Lisa Hahn
19. Lisa Schütze
21. Franzisca Hauke
22. Lea Stöckel
23. Marie Mävers
25. Janne Müller-Wieland
26. Hannah Gablać
28. Julia Müller (C)
29. Pia-Sophie Oldhafer
32. Zoe Shipperley (GK)
Japan

Head coach: Yuji Nagai

1. Ryoko Oie (GK)
2. Shiho Sakai
3. Keiko Manabe
4. Kana Nomura
5. Miyuki Nakagawa (C)
6. Akiko Ota
7. Shiho Otsuka
8. Nagisa Hayashi
9. Mie Nakashima
10. Akiko Kato
11. Akane Shibata
12. Maki Sakaguchi
13. Izuki Tanaka
14. Naho Ichitani
16. Yuri Nagai
17. Hazuki Nagai
18. Sakiyo Asano (GK)
23. Shoko Kanefuji
Netherlands

Head coach: Sjoerd Marijne

1. Joyce Sombroek (GK)
2. Frederique Derkx
3. Xan de Waard
7. Willemijn Bos
8. Marloes Keetels
9. Carlien Dirkse van den Heuvel
12. Lidewij Welten
13. Caia van Maasakker
16. Michelle van der Pols
17. Maartje Paumen (C)
18. Naomi van As
19. Ellen Hoog
20. Laura Nunnink
22. Larissa Meijer (GK)
23. Margot van Geffen
24. Eva de Goede
26. Roos Drost
31. Valerie Magis
New Zealand

Head coach: (Australia) Mark Hager

4. Olivia Merry
6. Petrea Webster
7. Aniwaka Roberts
8. Sally Rutherford (GK)
9. Brooke Neal
12. Ella Gunson
13. Samantha Charlton
14. Michaela Curtis
15. Julia King
16. Elizabeth Thompson
17. Sophie Cocks
21. Georgia Barnett
24. Rose Keddell
26. Pippa Hayward (GK)
27. Jordan Grant
28. Shiloh Gloyn
31. Stacey Michelsen
32. Anita Punt (C)

== Results ==
All times are Argentina Time (UTC−03:00)

=== First round ===
==== Pool A ====
Pos	Team	Pld	W	D	L	GF	GA	GD	Pts	Qualification
1	New Zealand	3	2	1	0	5	2	+3	7	Quarterfinals
2	Netherlands	3	2	1	0	4	1	+3	7	Quarterfinals
3	Japan	3	0	1	2	2	4	−2	1	Quarterfinals
4	China	3	0	1	2	1	5	−4	1	Quarterfinals

Source: FIH
Rules for classification: 1) points; 2) goal difference; 3) goals scored; 4) head-to-head result.

29 November 2014
11:30

Netherlands	2–0	China
Paumen 41', 42'	Report

Umpires:
Kelly Hudson (NZL)
Mercedes Sánchez (ARG)

29 November 2014
14:00

New Zealand	2–1	Japan
Merry 46'; Gunson 51'	Report	Kato 49'

Umpires:
Mariana Reydo (ARG)
Fanneke Alkemade (NED)

30 November 2014
11:30

New Zealand	1–1	Netherlands
Merry 46'	Report	Van Maasakker 28'

Umpires:
Chieko Soma (JPN)
Stephanie Judefind (USA)

30 November 2014
14:00

China	1–1	Japan
Li J. 26'	Report	Nakashima 25'

Umpires:
Annelize Rostron (RSA)
Sarah Wilson (SCO)

2 December 2014
18:00

China	0–2	New Zealand
	Report	Punt 18', 24'

Umpires:
Mariana Reydo (ARG)
Mercedes Sánchez (ARG)

2 December 2014
20:30

Netherlands	1–0	Japan
Paumen 60'	Report

Umpires:
Kylie Seymour (AUS)
Kelly Hudson (NZL)

==== Pool B ====
Pos	Team	Pld	W	D	L	GF	GA	GD	Pts	Qualification
1	Argentina (H)	3	2	1	0	6	2	+4	7	Quarterfinals
2	Australia	3	2	1	0	6	3	+3	7	Quarterfinals
3	Germany	3	0	1	2	2	5	−3	1	Quarterfinals
4	England	3	0	1	2	3	7	−4	1	Quarterfinals

Source: FIH
Rules for classification: 1) points; 2) goal difference; 3) goals scored; 4) head-to-head result.
(H) Hosts

29 November 2014
16:30

Australia	2–1	England
Kenny 6', 55'	Report	Watton 40'

Umpires:
Chieko Soma (JPN)
Sarah Wilson (SCO)

29 November 2014
19:00

Argentina	1–0	Germany
A. Habif 52'	Report

Umpires:
Kylie Seymour (AUS)
Annelize Rostron (RSA)

30 November 2014
16:30

England	1–1	Germany
Watton 40'	Report	Hillmann 22'

Umpires:
Lisa Roach (AUS)
Mercedes Sánchez (ARG)

30 November 2014
19:00

Argentina	1–1	Australia
Aymar 52'	Report	Smith 27'

Umpires:
Kelly Hudson (NZL)
Fanneke Alkemade (NED)

2 December 2014
13:00

Australia	3–1	Germany
Nanscawen 17'; Kenny 32'; Smith 45'	Report	Hauke 60'

Umpires:
Annelize Rostron (RSA)
Stephanie Judefind (USA)

2 December 2014
15:30

England	1–4	Argentina
Bray 7'	Report	Rebecchi 18'; D'Elía 51'; Luchetti 56'; Merino 58'

Umpires:
Chieko Soma (JPN)
Lisa Roach (AUS)

=== Second round ===
Quarterfinals
4 December 2014
New Zealand	3
England	1
4 December 2014
Australia	4
Japan	1
4 December 2014
Netherlands	1
Germany	0
4 December 2014
Argentina	7
China	2

Semi-finals
6 December 2014
New Zealand	1 (0)
Australia (p.s.o.)	1 (3)
6 December 2014
Netherlands	1
Argentina	2

Final
7 December 2014
Australia	1 (1)
Argentina (p.s.o.)	1 (3)
Third place match
7 December 2014
New Zealand	1
Netherlands	2

==== Quarter-finals ====
4 December 2014
13:00

Netherlands	1–0	Germany
Van der Pols 46'	Report

Umpires:
Lisa Roach (AUS)
Stephanie Judefind (USA)

4 December 2014
15:30

Australia	4–1	Japan
Nanscawen 4'; Kenny 7', 9'; Flanagan 54'	Report	Otsuka 51'

Umpires:
Fanneke Alkemade (NED)
Annelize Rostron (RSA)

4 December 2014
18:00

New Zealand	3–1	England
Keddell 11'; Punt 23'; Michelsen 50'	Report	Unsworth 13'

Umpires:
Mariana Reydo (ARG)
Kylie Seymour (AUS)

4 December 2014
20:30

Argentina	7–2	China
Barrionuevo 10', 55'; Romang 12'; Rebecchi 16', 30', 50'; Aymar 22'	Report	Wang M. 24'; Peng 56'

Umpires:
Sarah Wilson (SCO)
Kelly Hudson (NZL)

==== Fifth to eighth place classification ====
Crossover
6 December 2014
England	3
Japan	1
6 December 2014
Germany	0 (4)
China (p.s.o.)	0 (5)

Fifth place match
7 December 2014
England (p.s.o.)	1 (3)
Japan	1 (2)
Seventh place match
7 December 2014
Japan	3
Germany	5

===== Crossover =====
6 December 2014
11:30

England	3–1	Japan
Webb 11'; Bray 28'; Haycroft 49'	Report	Shibata 42'

Umpires:
Mercedes Sánchez (ARG)
Stephanie Judefind (USA)

6 December 2014
14:00

Germany	0–0	China
	Report
Penalties
Schütze (penalty shoot-out scored); Hauke (penalty shoot-out missed); Mävers (penalty shoot-out scored); Otte (penalty shoot-out scored); Altenburg (penalty shoot-out scored); Schütze (penalty shoot-out missed)	4–5	(penalty shoot-out scored) Peng; (penalty shoot-out scored) Liang; (penalty shoot-out missed) Cui; (penalty shoot-out scored) Li J. (penalty shoot-out scored) Yu; (penalty shoot-out scored) Peng

Umpires:
Fanneke Alkemade (NED)
Chieko Soma (JPN)

===== Seventh and eighth place =====
7 December 2014
11:30

Japan	3–5	Germany
Nakashima 3'; Ota 25'; Otsuka 55'	Report	Otte 5'; Müller 14', 20', 49'; Krüger 15'

Umpires:
Fanneke Alkemade (NED)
Mercedes Sánchez (ARG)

===== Fifth and sixth place =====
7 December 2014
14:00

England	1–1	China
McCallin 14'	Report	Cui 42'
Penalties
Twigg (penalty shoot-out missed); Unsworth (penalty shoot-out scored); Gilbert (penalty shoot-out missed); Bray (penalty shoot-out missed); Leigh (penalty shoot-out scored); Unsworth (penalty shoot-out scored)	3–2	(penalty shoot-out missed) Peng; (penalty shoot-out missed) Liang; (penalty shoot-out scored) Cui; (penalty shoot-out missed) Li J. (penalty shoot-out scored) Yu; (penalty shoot-out missed) Peng

Umpires:
Stephanie Judefind (USA)
Chieko Soma (JPN)

==== First to fourth place classification ====
===== Semi-finals =====
6 December 2014
16:30

New Zealand	1–1	Australia
Punt 2'	Report	Spence 40'
Penalties
Michelsen (penalty shoot-out missed); Punt (penalty shoot-out missed); Gunson (penalty shoot-out missed)	0–3	(penalty shoot-out scored) Nanscawen; (penalty shoot-out missed) Eastham; (penalty shoot-out scored) McMahon; (penalty shoot-out scored) Smith

Umpires:
Mariana Reydo (ARG)
Sarah Wilson (SCO)

6 December 2014
19:00

Netherlands	1–2	Argentina
Welten 15'	Report	D'Elía 31'; Rebecchi 60'

Umpires:
Lisa Roach (AUS)
Kylie Seymour (AUS)

===== Third and fourth place =====
7 December 2014
16:30

New Zealand	1–2	Netherlands
Cocks 29'	Report	De Waard 11'; Welten 16'

Umpires:
Lisa Roach (AUS)
Annelize Rostron (RSA)

===== Final =====
7 December 2014
19:00

Australia	1–1	Argentina
Slattery 35'	Report	F. Habif 39'
Penalties
Nanscawen (penalty shoot-out missed); Eastham (penalty shoot-out scored); McMahon (penalty shoot-out missed); E. Smith (penalty shoot-out missed)	1–3	(penalty shoot-out scored) Aymar; (penalty shoot-out scored) Rebecchi; (penalty shoot-out scored) D'Elía; (penalty shoot-out missed) Merino

Estadio Mendocino de Hockey
Umpires:
Kelly Hudson (NZL)
Sarah Wilson (SCO)

Team details

Argentina
Australia

GK	1	Belén Succi
DF	5	Macarena Rodríguez
DF	14	Agustina Habif
DF	25	Silvina D'Elía
DF	27	Noel Barrionuevo
MF	4	Rosario Luchetti
MF	8	Luciana Aymar (c)
MF	16	Florencia Habif
MF	24	Pilar Romang
FW	11	Carla Rebecchi
FW	12	Delfina Merino
Substitutions:
MF	6	Jimena Cedrés	(substituted on) 9'
FW	7	Martina Cavallero	(substituted on) 8'
MF	17	Rocío Sánchez Moccia	(substituted on) 8'
DF	21	Mariela Scarone	(substituted on) 10'
DF	29	Julia Gomes Fantasia	(substituted on) 10'
FW	30	Josefina Sruoga	(substituted on) 21'
Manager:
(Argentina) Santiago Capurro

GK	5	Ashlee Wells
DF	7	Jodie Kenny
DF	9	Anna Flanagan
DF	11	Karri McMahon
DF	13	Edwina Bone
MF	4	Casey Eastham
MF	8	Ashleigh Nelson
MF	2	Georgia Nanscawen
FW	3	Brooke Peris
FW	20	Kathryn Slattery
FW	26	Emily Smith
Substitutions:
MF	1	Gabrielle Nance	(substituted on) 5'
DF	6	Kirstin Dwyer	(substituted on) 4'
FW	10	Rebecca Dwyer	(substituted on) 5'
MF	15	Amelia Spence	(substituted on) 4'
FW	28	Mathilda Carmichael	(substituted on) 3'
MF	29	Teneal Attard	(substituted on) 3'
Manager:
(Australia) Adam Commens

== Awards ==
Player of the Tournament	Top Goalscorers	Goalkeeper of the Tournament	Young Player of the Tournament
(Argentina) Luciana Aymar	(Argentina) Carla Rebecchi (Australia) Jodie Kenny	(Argentina) Belén Succi	(Netherlands) Xan de Waard

== Statistics ==
=== Final standings ===
Pos	Team	Pld	W	D	L	GF	GA	GD	Pts	Final standings
1st place, gold medalist(s)	Argentina	6	4	2	0	16	6	+10	14	Gold Medal
2nd place, silver medalist(s)	Australia	6	3	3	0	12	6	+6	12	Silver Medal
3rd place, bronze medalist(s)	Netherlands	6	4	1	1	8	4	+4	13	Bronze Medal
4	New Zealand	6	3	2	1	10	6	+4	11	
5	England	6	1	2	3	8	12	−4	5	
6	China	6	0	3	3	4	13	−9	3	
7	Germany	6	1	2	3	7	9	−2	5	
8	Japan	6	0	1	5	7	16	−9	1	

Source: FIH

=== Goalscorers ===
There were 72 goals scored in 24 matches, for an average of 3 goals per match.

5 goals

- (Argentina) Carla Rebecchi
- (Australia) Jodie Kenny

4 goals

- (New Zealand) Anita Punt

3 goals

- (Germany) Julia Müller
- (Netherlands) Maartje Paumen

2 goals

- (Argentina) Luciana Aymar
- (Argentina) Noel Barrionuevo
- (Argentina) Silvina D'Elía
- (Australia) Georgia Nanscawen
- (Australia) Emily Smith
- (England) Sophie Bray
- (England) Ellie Watton
- (Japan) Mie Nakashima
- (Japan) Shiho Otsuka
- (Netherlands) Lidewij Welten
- (New Zealand) Olivia Merry

1 goal

- (Argentina) Agustina Habif
- (Argentina) Florencia Habif
- (Argentina) Rosario Luchetti
- (Argentina) Delfina Merino
- (Argentina) Pilar Romang
- (Australia) Anna Flanagan
- (Australia) Kathryn Slattery
- (Australia) Amelia Spence
- (China) Cui Qiuxia
- (China) Li Jiaqi
- (China) Peng Yang
- (China) Wang Mengyu
- (England) Sarah Haycroft
- (England) Shona McCallin
- (England) Laura Unsworth
- (England) Hollie Webb
- (Germany) Franzisca Hauke
- (Germany) Kristina Hillmann
- (Germany) Hannah Krüger
- (Germany) Katharina Otte
- (Japan) Akiko Kato
- (Japan) Akiko Ota
- (Japan) Akane Shibata
- (Netherlands) Xan de Waard
- (Netherlands) Michelle van der Pols
- (Netherlands) Caia van Maasakker
- (New Zealand) Sophie Cocks
- (New Zealand) Ella Gunson
- (New Zealand) Rose Keddell
- (New Zealand) Stacey Michelsen

Source: FIH
