= Amelia Spence =

Australian field hockey player

Personal information
- Born: 23 June 1993 (age 33) Hobart, Tasmania

Sport
- Sport: Field hockey
- Position: Midfielder
- Club: Tassie Van Demons
National team
Years	Team	Caps	Goals
2014–2015	Australia	11	(1)
Medal record
Women's field hockey
Representing Australia
Champions Trophy
Silver medal – second place	2014 Mendoza	Team

Amelia Spence (born 23 June 1993) is a former Australian field hockey player.

== Personal life ==
Spence was born in Hobart, Tasmania, and made her senior international debut in a test series against New Zealand in November 2014.

== Career ==
=== Junior National Team ===
Spence first represented Australia in its junior ranks, representing the Under 21 side, 'The Jillaroos'.

She first represented the team at the Australian Youth Olympic Festival in 2013, winning gold with the team. She was also a member of the team at the 2013 Junior World Cup, where Australia finished in sixth place.

=== Senior National Team ===
Following her debut against New Zealand, Spence represented Australia at the 2014 Champions Trophy. At the tournament, she scored her first international goal in the semi-final against New Zealand.

Spence last represented Australia in September 2015, in a test match against Korea.

==== International Goals ====
Goal	Date	Location	Opponent	Score	Result	Competition	Ref.
1	6 December 2014	Estadio Mendocino de Hockey, Mendoza, Argentina	New Zealand	1–1	1–1	2014 Hockey Champions Trophy	
