= Shipperley =

Shipperley is a surname. Notable people with the surname include:

- Dave Shipperley (1952–2017), English footballer
- Dom Shipperley (born 1991), Australian rugby league player
- Neil Shipperley (born 1974), English footballer and manager
- Zoe Shipperley (born 1990), English field hockey player
