= Larissa Meijer =

Dutch field hockey player (born 1990)

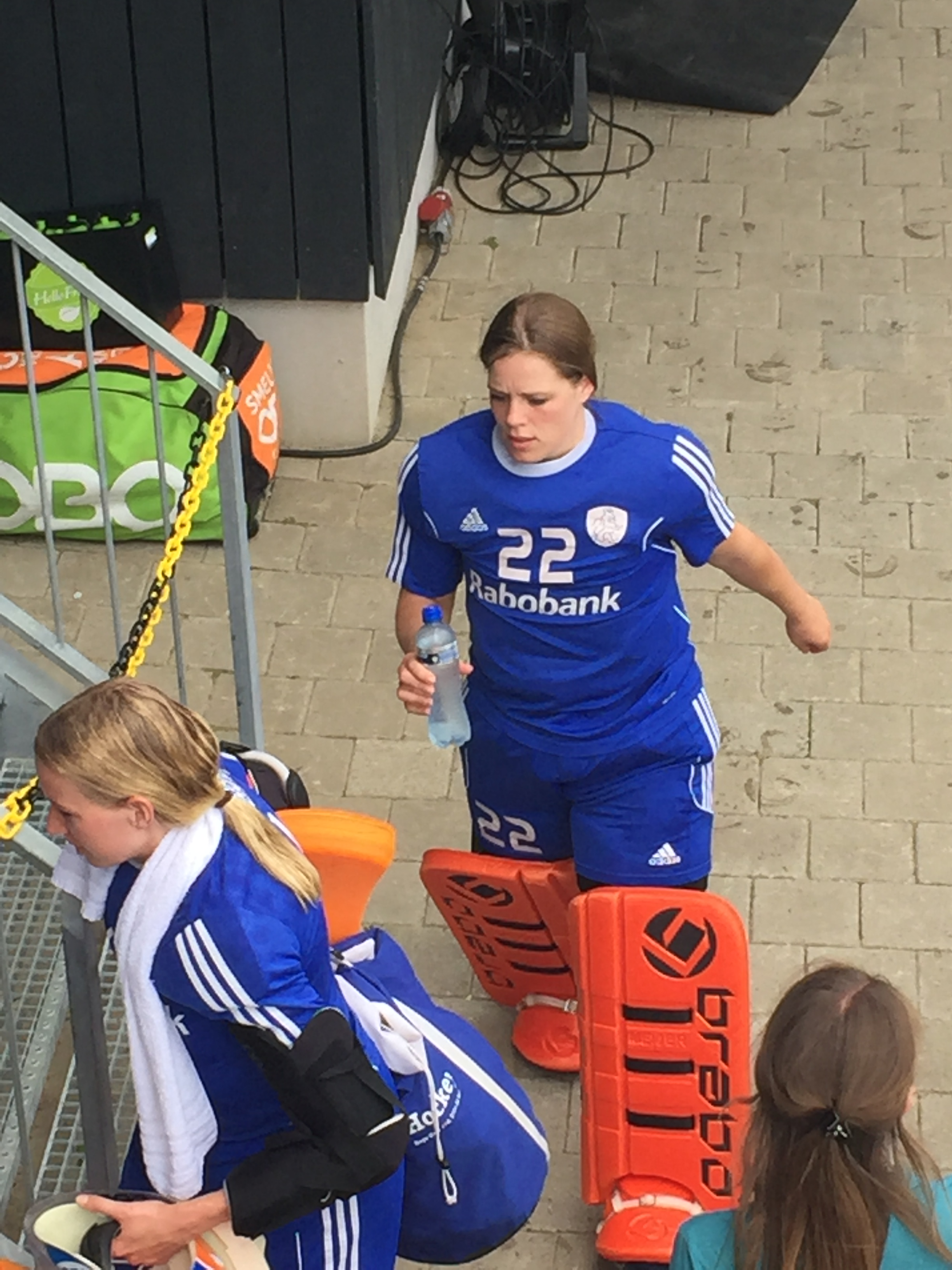
- Meijer in 2016

Personal information
- Born: 15 July 1990 (age 36) Eindhoven

Sport
- Sport: Field hockey
- Position: Goalkeepers
Medal record
Women's field hockey
Representing Netherlands
World Cup
| Gold medal – first place | 2014 The Hague | Team |
Champions Trophy
| Bronze medal – third place | 2014 Mendoza | Team |

Larissa Meijer (born 15 July 1990, Eindhoven) is a Dutch field hockey player who plays as a goalkeeper. Meijer was a member of the Netherlands women's national field hockey team that won the 2014 Women's Hockey World Cup. Meijer's Dutch club team is Oranje Zwart.
