= Eloise Laity =

Welsh field hockey player

Ellie Laity
Personal information
- Full name: Eloise Frances Laity
- Born: 9 May 1994 (age 32) Wales
- Height: 175 cm (5 ft 9 in)
- Weight: 63 kg (139 lb)

Sport
- Sport: Field hockey
- Position: Midfielder
- Club: Clifton Robinsons
National team
| Years | Team | Caps | Goals |
| 2014– | Wales | 54 | (9) |
Medal record
Women's field hockey
Representing Wales
Hockey Series
| Bronze medal – third place | 2018–19 Vilnius | Open |

Eloise Frances "Ellie" Laity (born 9 May 1994) is a Welsh international field hockey player, who plays as a midfielder for Wales.

== Career ==
=== Club hockey ===
Laity plays club hockey in the Women's England Hockey League Premier Division for Clifton Robinsons.

She has also played for Buckingham.

=== National team ===
Eloise Laity made her debut for Wales in 2014, during a test–series against Canada in Cardiff.

The most notable representation of her hockey career came at the 2018 Commonwealth Games, where despite finishing second to last, was Laity's first major tournament with the national team.

==== International goals ====
| Goal | Date | Location | Opponent | Score | Result | Competition | Ref. |
|---|---|---|---|---|---|---|---|
| 1 | 12 July 2014 | Lee Valley Hockey and Tennis Centre, London, England | South Africa | 2–8 | 2–8 | 2014 Investec Cup | |
| 2 | 17 January 2017 | Stadium Hoki Tun Razak, Kuala Lumpur, Malaysia | Thailand | 3–0 | 3–0 | 2016–17 HWL Round 2 | |
| 3 | 29 May 2017 | Glasgow National Hockey Centre, Glasgow, Scotland | Scotland | 1–1 | 2–1 | Test Match | |
| 4 | 24 June 2017 | Sophia Gardens, Cardiff, Wales | Poland | 1–0 | 2–0 | Test Match | |
| 5 | 9 August 2017 | Sophia Gardens, Cardiff, Wales | Belarus | 2–2 | 2–4 | 2017 EuroHockey Championship II | |
| 6 | 6 April 2018 | Gold Coast Hockey Centre, Gold Coast, Australia | England | 1–2 | 1–5 | 2018 Commonwealth Games | |
| 7 | 4 August 2018 | Warsaw, Poland | Poland | 1–1 | 2–1 | Test Match | |
| 8 | 4 August 2018 | Warsaw, Poland | Poland | 2–1 | 2–1 | Test Match | |
| 9 | 1 June 2019 | Sophia Gardens, Cardiff, Wales | France | 1–0 | 3–1 | Test Match | |
