= Estadio Mendocino de Hockey =

Field hockey stadium in Mendoza, Argentina

Hockey Stadium of Mendoza
- Estadio Mendocino de Hockey
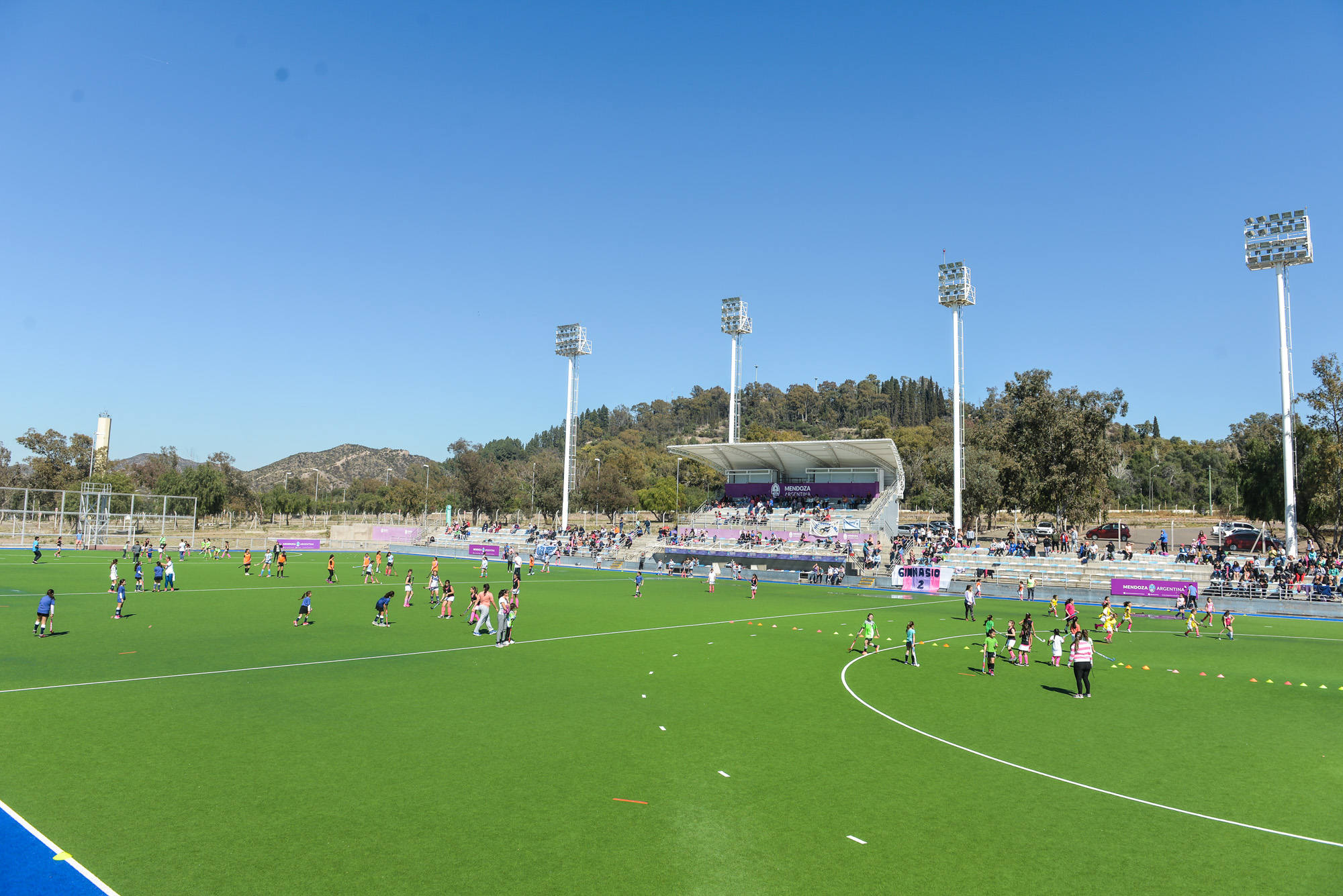
- The stadium in 2017
- Interactive map of Hockey Stadium of Mendoza
- Address: Av. del Libertador s/n Mendoza; Argentina
- Owner: Government of Mendoza
- Capacity: 1,700
- Type: Stadium
- Surface: Artificial turf
- Scoreboard: Yes
- Screen: LED

Construction
- Opened: 2013; 13 years ago

Tenant
- Argentina women's team (2014–)

Website
- mendoza.gov.ar/estadio-de-hockey

Estadio Mendocino de Hockey is a field hockey stadium located in the city of Mendoza in the homonymous province of Argentina. It is owned and operated by the Provincial Government and has a capacity of 1,700 spectators, which places it first among the largest hockey stadiums in Argentina.

== Overview ==
The stadium was specifically built to host the 2013 Women's Pan American Cup. and was inaugurated on 18 September. Its pitch has a water-based artificial turf, and a lighting system to hold night matches.

It is located at "Parque Deportivo", a sports complex in the General San Martín Park of Mendoza that includes a running track (with artificial surface of 4,400 m2), three tennis courts, the Aconcagua indoor arena, and a bike path.

Estadio Malvinas Argentinas' facilities include four locker rooms for hockey teams and two for referees, a first aid room, access for mobility-impaired persons, and automatic irrigation system, among others.

== Events ==
- 2013 Women's Pan American Cup, the first international event hosted at Estadio Mendocino, organised by the Pan American Hockey Federation.
- In 2014, the stadium hosted all the matches of Women's Champions Trophy, one of the top tier tournaments organised by the International Hockey Federation (FIH). Argentina won the title after defeating Australia 3–1 on penalties.
- In 2021, the stadium was the venue of Campeonato Argentino de Clubes.
