= Katie O'Donnell Bam =

American field hockey player

Katie Bam
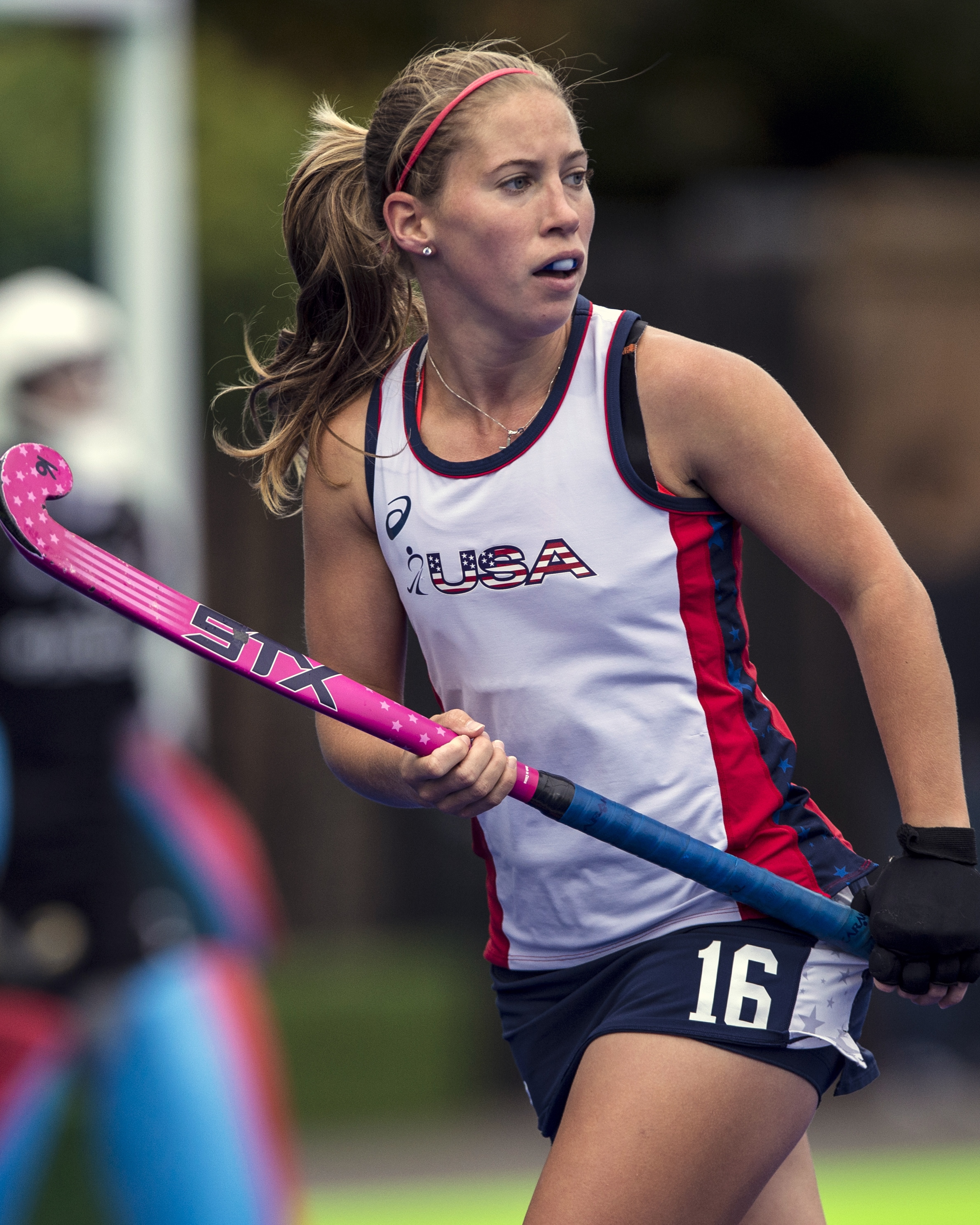
- Bam in 2016

Personal information
- Full name: Kathleen O'Donnell Bam
- Nickname: Odie
- Born: December 6, 1988 (age 37) Norristown, Pennsylvania
- Education: University of Maryland
- Height: 5 ft 2 in (157 cm)
- Spouse: Marvin Bam
- Website: www.katieodonnellfh.com

Sport
- Country: United States
- Sport: Field hockey
- Position: Striker
- University team: Maryland Terrapins
- Now coaching: Harvard (2016-present)

Achievements and titles
- National finals: NCAA Champion 2008, 2010
Medal record
Women's field hockey
Representing United States
Hockey Champions Trophy
Bronze medal – third place	2016 London	USA
Pan American Games
Gold medal – first place	2015 Toronto	USA
Gold medal – first place	2011 Guadalajara	USA
- Updated on 8 September 2016

Kathleen "Katie" O'Donnell Bam (born December 6, 1988) is an American field hockey player. She was born in Norristown, Pennsylvania, and attended Wissahickon High School in Ambler, Pennsylvania. O'Donnell began playing for the Maryland Terrapins in the 2007 season. She was the youngest member of the 2005 United States women's national team and has become known for her excellent stick skills and ability to create. Her attributes were put on full display throughout her freshman campaign as she earned a starting position for the preseason number-one team in the country at forward.

== High school ==
O'Donnell helped lead Wissahickon to the District 1 title by scoring the game-winning goal in double overtime to win the championship. She continued her dominance in her sophomore year and recorded 24 goals and 9 assists in her junior year despite missing weeks of the season to travel with the US U-16 team.

In her senior season, she surpassed the 100-career-goal milestone.

She led the team in goals and assists all four years, having her best statistical years in her freshman and sophomore seasons, largely due to travel with US teams in her junior and senior seasons. O'Donnell received numerous awards for her achievement, earning NFHCA first-team All-American honors two times and Player of the Year honors three times by the Reporter. Her awards also include a variety of all-league, all-area, and all-state honors.

== College ==
O'Donnell established her presence early at the University of Maryland putting together a freshman campaign worthy of national recognition. She finished the season with 18 goals and 17 assists leading the nation in points by a margin of 10 with 53 points. She scored goals in 13 of 21 games including 5 multi-scoring games. O'Donnell had 6 game-winning goals including one in overtime against then 12th ranked Michigan. O'Donnell earned ACC Offensive Player of the Year honors, the only freshman to ever receive the award. She also earned National Rookie of the Year and First Team All American honors. She won the Honda Sports Award as the nation's best female collegiate field hockey player in both 2010 and 2011.

Maryland won the NCAA Women's Field Hockey Championship in 2008.

== International ==
O'Donnell was selected to the US U-16 and U-19 teams in 2003 and 2004 and competed in tournaments in the Netherlands and Australia. In 2005, she became the youngest member of the US Senior National team and earned her first of 23 total international caps at the age of 16. She scored her first international goal at the Rabobank Champions Challenge in 2005. O'Donnell helped the USA Junior team to a best-ever 7th-place finish at the 2005 Junior World Cup in Santiago, Chile. She also competed with the U-21 team in China in March 2007. O'Donnell will be training in California in 2008 preparing to qualify for the 2008 Summer Olympics in Beijing. Unfortunately O'Donnell did not make the 2008 team. She did, however, qualify for the US team for the 2012 Summer Olympics, where she played in all 6 of the US's games, and scored one goal.

She was part of the US teams that won gold at the 2011 and 2015 Pan-American Games. She was named to the Pan American Elite Team for her performances at the 2011 Games.

She also played at the 2016 Olympics. That year, she was also part of the team that won bronze at the Champions Trophy in London.

== Awards and honors ==
2009 Athletic Achievements

- 2009 National Player of the Year (womensfieldhockey.com)
- 2009 National Offensive MVP (womensfieldhockey.com)
- 2009 First Team NFHCA All-American
- 2009 NCAA All-Tournament Team
- 2009 All-Mid Atlantic Region Player of the Year (NFHCA)
- 2009 ACC Offensive Player of the Year
- 2009 ACC Tournament MVP
- 2009 national leader in points (87) and assists (31)
- 24th player in NCAA history with 200+ points
- 18 points in four-game run as NCAA Runner-Up
- Set NCAA Championship single-game record with nine points in NCAA Semifinal win
- Broke Maryland's single-season points record with 87
- Tied for 2nd single-season goals record with 28
- Broke school record with 31 single-season assists

Career Athletic Achievements

- 2010 National Sportswoman of the Year Team Sport (Women's Sports Foundation)
- 2010–11 Honda Sports Award for field hockey
- 2009–10 Honda Sports Award for field hockey
- Two-time National Offensive MVP (womensfieldhockey.com)
- Three-time ACC Offensive Player of the Year
- Three-time First Team NFHCA All-American
- Two-time NCAA All-Tournament team member
- 2008 All-ACC Tournament team member
- 2007 National Rookie of the Year (womensfieldhockey.com)
- 2007–08 Honda Award nominee
- NCAA Tournament record holder with 13 career assists
- ACC and Maryland career assist leader with 74 career assists
- Maryland career points leader with 208 career points
- Third on Maryland career goals list with 67

== Endorsements ==
On March 4, 2013, it was announced that O'Donnell had signed a four-year agreement to represent and advise on products for American field hockey manufacturer STX (sports manufacturer), the same day she scored her first international goal with an STX stick in a 6–0 win over Brazil during the World Hockey League qualifiers in Rio.
