= Danny Kerry =

English cricketer

Danny Kerry (born 10 January 1982) was an English cricketer. He was a right-handed batsman and a right-arm medium-fast bowler who played for Dorset. He was born in Poole, Dorset.

Kerry made a single List A appearance, in the C&G trophy in August 2002, against Worcestershire Cricket Board. From the middle of the order, he scored two runs with the bat, and bowled four overs, conceding 20 runs.

Kerry played for Winchmore Hill in the Cockspur Cup and the Evening Standard Challenge Trophy between 2004 and 2007.
