= Dalila Mirabella =

Italian field hockey player (born 1994)

Personal information
- Born: 23 December 1994 (age 31)

Sport
- Sport: Field hockey
- Position: Midfielder
- Club: Real Sociedad Hockey
National team
Years	Team	Caps	Goals
–	Italy	106	-

Dalila Mirabella (born 23 December 1994) is an Italian field hockey player for the Italian national team.

She participated at the 2018 Women's Hockey World Cup.
