= Hélène Delmée =

Belgian field hockey player

Helene Delmee (born 16 May 1987, Ottignies-Louvain-La-Neuve, Belgium) is a Belgian field hockey player. At the 2012 Summer Olympics she competed with the Belgium women's national field hockey team in the women's tournament.
