= Lauren Pfeiffer =

American field hockey player

Lauren Pfeiffer (born 1987) is a former field hockey defender who represented the United States in international competition.

Pfeiffer was raised in Mount Laurel, New Jersey and attended Lenape High School. She picked up her interest in field hockey from her mother, who had competed interscholastically at Rowan University.

Pfeiffer graduated from the University of Iowa in 2009, where she played for the Hawkeyes. Pfeiffer scored 53 goals in her career and was a part of three Big Ten championships and was part of the team that made it to the NCAA Final Four in 2008.
