= Agata Wybieralska =

Polish-Italian field hockey player

Personal information
- Born: 6 June 1978 (age 48)

Sport
- Sport: Field hockey
- Position: Defender
- Club: HC Argentia
National team
Years	Team	Caps	Goals
–	Poland	26	-
–	Italy	98	-

Agata Wybieralska (born 6 June 1978) is a Polish-Italian field hockey player for the Italian national team.

She participated at the 2018 Women's Hockey World Cup.
