= Zoe Shipperley =

English field hockey player

Personal information
- Born: 17 March 1990 (age 36) Oxford, England
- Height: 1.72 m (5 ft 8 in)
- Weight: 72 kg (159 lb)

Sport
- Sport: Field hockey
- Position: Defender
- Club: Buckingham
Senior career
Years	Team	Caps	Goals
–	Aylesbury HC	-	-
National team
Years	Team	Caps	Goals
2014–2018	England & GB	58	(2)
Medal record
Representing England
European Championships
Bronze medal – third place	2017 Amstelveen
Commonwealth Games
Silver medal – second place	2014 Glasgow	Team
- Updated on 28 October 2020

Zoe Shipperley (born 17 March 1990) is an English international field hockey player who played as a defender for England and Great Britain.

She plays club hockey in the Women's England Hockey League Premier Division for Buckingham.

Shipperley competed for England in the women's hockey tournament at the 2014 Commonwealth Games winning a silver medal.
