= Chiara Tiddi =

Italian field hockey player (born 1988)

Personal information
- Born: 16 December 1988 (age 37)

Sport
- Sport: Field hockey
- Position: Defender
- Club: SV Kampong
National team
Years	Team	Caps	Goals
2012–	Italy	148	-

Chiara Tiddi (born 16 December 1988) is an Italian field hockey player.

Tiddi is the current captain of the Italian national team, and made her senior international debut in 2012.
