= Anupa Barla =

Indian female field hockey player

Personal information
- Born: 6 May 1994 (age 32) Kukuda, Rajgangpur, Sundergarh, Odisha, India

Sport
- Sport: Field hockey
- Position: Centre forward
Senior career
Years	Team	Caps	Goals
–	Railways	-	-
National team
Years	Team	Caps	Goals
2011–	India U18		-
2012–2013	India U21		-
2012–	India		-
Medal record
Women's field hockey
Representing India
Asian Champions Trophy
Silver medal – second place	2018 Donghae
Junior World Cup
Bronze medal – third place	2013 Mönchengladbach
Junior Asia Cup
Silver medal – second place	2012 Bangkok
Girls' Asia Cup
Bronze medal – third place	2011 Bangkok

Anupa Barla (born 6 May 1994) is an Indian female field hockey player, who plays as a centre forward. She was part of the national girls' team that won bronze at the 2011 Youth Asia Cup in Bangkok.
