= Kareena Cuthbert =

Scottish field hockey and badminton player

Kareena "Kaz" Cuthbert (née Marshall) was born 27 January 1987. Cuthbert is a female field hockey player from Scotland. She has made over 150 appearances for the Women's National Team.

Marshall was born in Paisley and attended Greenock Academy then Glasgow School of Sport, Bellahouston Academy. She had initially been competing at badminton before concentrating on playing hockey. She studied at Glasgow Caledonian University, graduating with a BSc (hons) in Physiotherapy.

Marshall plays club hockey for Western Wildcats, based in Milngavie. She has played in the Commonwealth Games tournament in Dehli & 2018 Commonwealth Games Gold Coast.

Her brother William also plays hockey for Scotland and their mother Judith is a former England international.

Marshall works as a physiotherapist in Glasgow.
