= Giuliana Ruggieri =

Italian-Argentine field hockey player (born 1990)

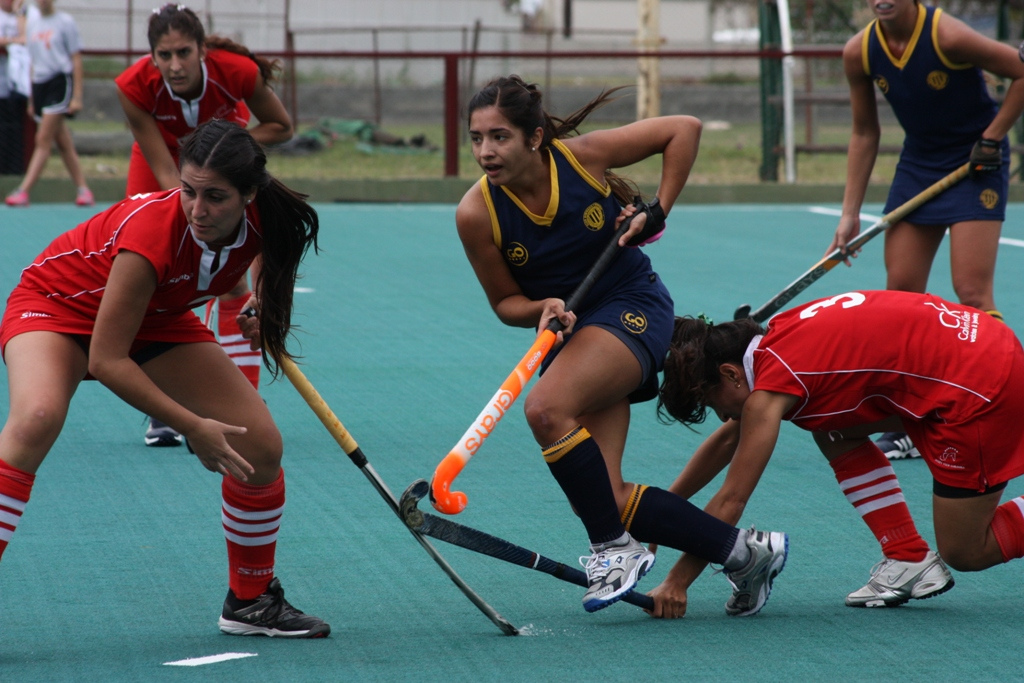

Personal information
- Born: Giuliana Sofía Ruggieri; 27 December 1990 (age 35) Argentina

Sport
- Sport: Field hockey
- Position: Forward
- Club: GER
National team
Years	Team	Caps	Goals
-2019	Italy	80	(56)

Giuliana Sofía Ruggieri (born 27 December 1990) is an Italian-Argentine field hockey player who competed in the 2015 Women's EuroHockey Nations Championship.

== Personal life ==
She was born in Argentina.
