= Erica Coppey =

Belgian field hockey player

Erica Coppey (born 8 September 1991) is a Belgian field hockey player. At the 2012 Summer Olympics she competed with the Belgium women's national field hockey team in the women's tournament.

At age 28, she retired from field hockey and became a surgeon.
