= Elisabetta Pacella =

Italian field hockey player (born 1994)

Personal information
- Born: 3 May 1994 (age 32)

Sport
- Sport: Field hockey
- Position: Forward
- Club: Real Sociedad Hockey
National team
Years	Team	Caps	Goals
–	Italy	107	-

Elisabetta Pacella (born 3 May 1994) is an Italian field hockey player for the Italian national team.

She participated at the 2018 Women's Hockey World Cup.
