= Samantha Judge =

Scottish field hockey and badminton player

Samantha Judge (born 22 March 1978) is a Scottish field hockey player. She has made 199 appearances for the Women's National Team. She is the current coach at Edinburgh University Hockey Club.

Judge was born in Paisley and attended Hutchesons' Grammar School. She also played badminton for Scotland at U16 level. She graduated with a degree in sports science from the University of Edinburgh.

Judge played club hockey for Glasgow Western and made her debut for the Women's National Team in 1999. She played in three consecutive Commonwealth Games tournaments: Manchester, Melbourne and Dehli. Despite having been a cornerstone of Scotland's attack over several years, Judge wasn't selected for the squad ahead of the 2014 Games in Glasgow.

Judge is the director of hockey at George Watson's college and head of performance for Women's hockey at the university of Edinburgh .
