= Phoebe Richards =

Welsh field hockey player

Personal information
- Born: 26 March 1993 (age 33) Knighton, Wales
- Height: 167 cm (5 ft 6 in)
- Weight: 63 kg (139 lb)

Sport
- Sport: Field hockey
- Position: Forward
- Club: Clifton Robinsons
Senior career
Years	Team	Caps	Goals
2015–2019	Buckingham	74	26
2019–	Clifton Robinsons	5	3
National team
Years	Team	Caps	Goals
2012–	Wales	120	(20)
Medal record
Women's field hockey
Representing Wales
Hockey Series
Bronze medal – third place	2018–19 Vilnius	Open

Phoebe Richards (born 26 March 1993) is a field hockey player from Wales, who plays as a forward.

== Personal life ==
Phoebe Richards was born and raised in Knighton, Wales.

In addition to hockey, Richards also used to play football for England at Under–15 and Under–17 levels. Her grandmother is of English descent, allowing her to play for her neighbouring country.

== Career ==
=== Club hockey ===
In the English Hockey League, Richards played club hockey for Buckingham from the 2015–2019. In 2019, she transferred clubs to Clifton Robinsons.

=== National team ===
Phoebe Richards made her international debut for Wales during the 2012 Celtic Cup.

Since her 2012 debut, Richards has become an integral member of the Welsh team, with continued appearances each year. Her most prominent achievements include representing the national side at the Commonwealth Games in 2014, 2018 and 2022.
