= Stephanie De Groof =

Belgian field hockey player

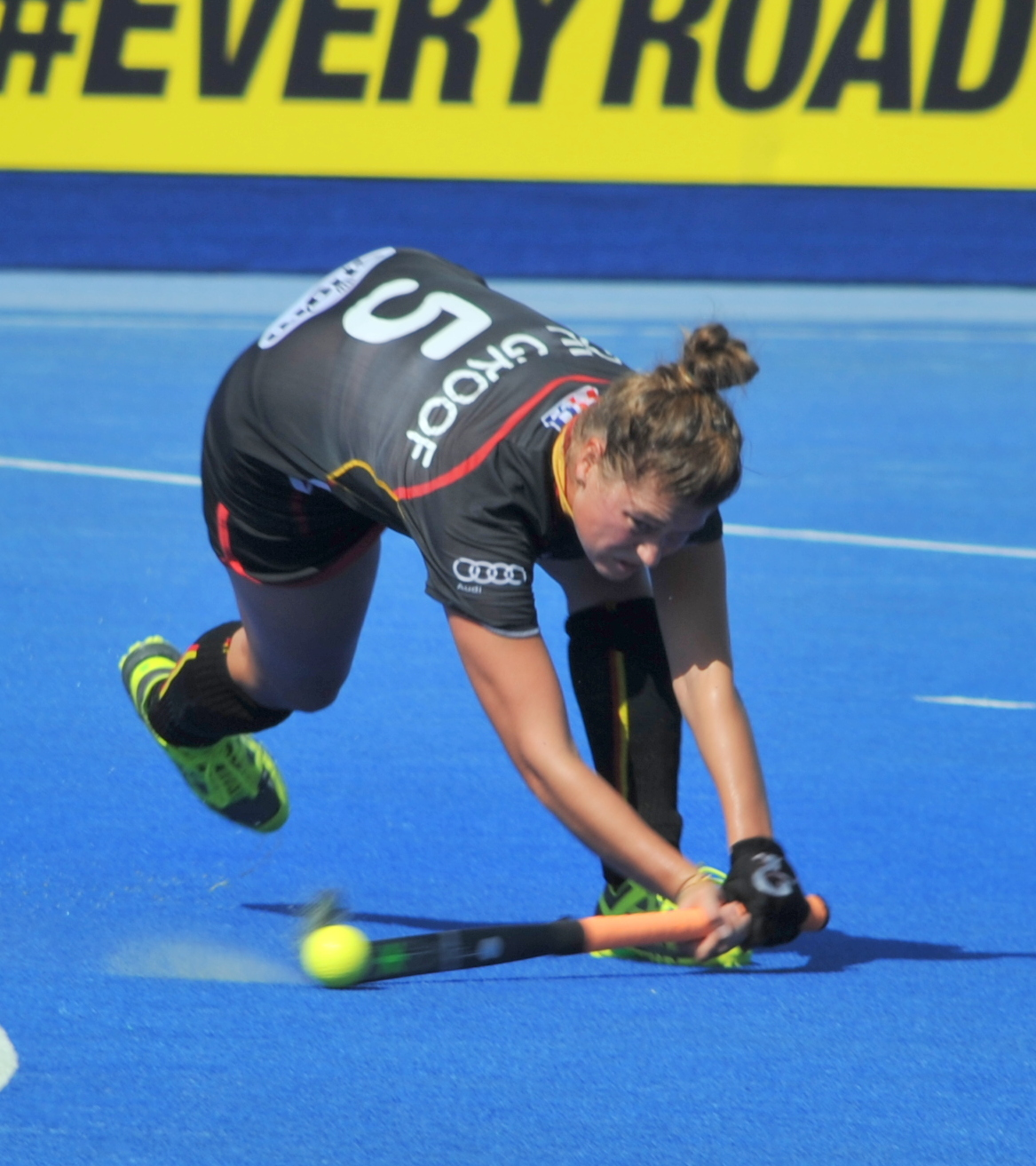

Personal information
- Born: 29 May 1991 (age 35) Antwerp, Belgium

Sport
- Sport: Field hockey
- Club: KHC Dragons
National team
Years	Team	Caps	Goals
2012-2016	Belgium	201	(37)

Stephanie De Groof (born 29 May 1991, Antwerp) is a Belgian field hockey player. At the 2012 Summer Olympics she competed with the Belgium women's national field hockey team in the women's tournament. She plays for KHC Dragons. And was auctioned by the Delhi SG Pipers at the inaugural Hockey India League for women.
