= Alison Bell (field hockey) =

Scottish field hockey player

Personal information
- Born: 5 September 1984 (age 41)

Sport
- Sport: Field hockey
National team
Years	Team	Caps	Goals
–	Scotland		-

Alison Bell (born 5 September 1984) is a Scottish female field hockey player who plays for the Scotland women's national field hockey team. She has represented Scotland in few international competitions including the 2005 Women's Hockey Junior World Cup, 2013 Women's EuroHockey Nations Championship, 2010 Commonwealth Games, and 2014 Commonwealth Games.

She also pursued her PhD in sports coaching from the University of Stirling in early 2012.
