= Vikki Bunce =

Scottish field hockey player

Vikki Bunce (born 12 February 1983, in Dundee), is a former Scottish international field hockey player who played as a forward for Scotland.

She plays club hockey for Dundee Wanderers. She was a member of the Scotland team which failed to qualify for the World Hockey Cup at the 2006 Women's Hockey World Cup Qualifier in Rome, Italy. Scotland finished in tenth position.

In January 2014, she was the captain of the Scotland team.

Bunce attended Abertay University, graduating with a BSc in Sport, Health & Exercise.
