= Nikki Kidd =

Scottish field hockey player

Nikki Kidd (born 14 August 1987 in Buckie) is a female field hockey forward from Scotland. She plays club hockey for Bonagrass Grove, and made her debut for the Women's National Team in 2006. Kidd, a resident of Longside, attended Mintlaw Academy where she was a national level middle distance runner, and had football trials for Scotland at U15 level before focusing solely on hockey.
