= 2013 Women's Australian Hockey League =

Tournament details
- Host country: Australia
- City: Hobart
- Teams: 8
- Venue: Tasmanian Hockey Centre

Final positions
- Champions: (Queensland) QLD Scorchers (4th title)
- Runner-up: (Western Australia) WA Diamonds
- Third place: (New South Wales) NSW Arrows

Tournament statistics
- Matches played: 24
- Goals scored: 89 (3.71 per match)
- Top scorer: (New South Wales) Hollie Webster (4 goals)
- Best player: (South Australia) Karri McMahon
- Best goalkeeper: (Western Australia) Ashlee Wells

The 2013 Women's Australian Hockey League was the 21st edition of the women's field hockey tournament. The tournament was held in the Tasmania city of Hobart.

The Queensland Scorchers won the gold medal for the fourth time by defeating the WA Diamonds 2–0 in a penalty shoot-out, after the final ended a 0–0 draw.

== Competition format ==
The tournament is divided into two pools, Pool A and Pool B, consisting of four teams in a round-robin format. Teams then progress into either Pool C, the medal round, or Pool D, the classification round. Teams carry over points from their previous match ups, and contest teams they are yet to play.

The top two teams in each of pools A and B then progress to Pool C. The top two teams in Pool C continue to contest the Final, while the bottom two teams of Pool C play in the Third and Fourth-place match.

The remaining bottom placing teams make up Pool D. The top two teams in Pool D play in the Fifth and Sixth-place match, while the bottom two teams of Pool C play in the Seventh and Eighth-place match.

== Teams ==
(Australian Capital Territory) Canberra Strikers
- Catriona Bailey-Price
- Edwina Bone (C)
- Meredith Bone
- Abbey Cambridge
- Jenna Cartwright
- Samantha Charlton
- Kalindi Commerford
- Jennifer Day
- Samantha Economos
- Naomi Evans
- Anna Flanagan
- Kate Gilmore
- Stephanie Kindon
- Grace O'Hanlon (GK)
- Rebecca Sneskov
- Tina Taseska
- Shelley Watson
(New South Wales) NSW Arrows
- Jocelyn Bartram (GK)
- Eliza Brazel
- Mathilda Carmichael
- Jade Close
- Casey Eastham (C)
- Kyah Gray
- Kate Hanna
- Emily Hurtz
- Nina Khoury
- Tamsin Lee
- Rachel Miller
- Georgina Morgan
- Kirsten Pearce
- Rachelle Pole (GK)
- Johanna Rowlands
- Emily Smith
- Hollie Webster
- Kellie White
(Northern Territory) NT Pearls
- Manekha Byerley
- Jodie Cliffe
- Elizabeth Duguid (GK)
- Clair Fernández
- Savannah Fitzpatrick
- Teagan Gmeiner
- Kazzia Lammon
- Jasmine Larosa
- Prue MacLeod
- Jemma Markos
- Ashleigh Morrison
- Danica Mazzini
- Kayla Orrick
- Sarah Paul
- Brooke Peris (C)
- Kate Siddel
- Danielle Sutherland
(Queensland) QLD Scorchers
- Murphy Allendorf
- Renée Ashton
- Teneal Attard
- Madonna Blyth (C)
- Jacqueline Day
- Ashlea Fey
- Madison Fitzpatrick
- Jordyn Holzberger
- Kirstin Johnson
- Alyssa Kerr
- Stephanie Kershaw
- Lindsey Leck (GK)
- Kandice Olivieri
- Rebecca Reuter
- Jodie Schulz
- Audrey Smith (GK)
- Madelaine Smith
- Jamie Stone
(South Australia) SA Suns
- Jane Claxton
- Holly Evans (C)
- De-Anne Gilbert (GK)
- Emily Grist
- Georgina Hollitt
- Bianca Joyce
- Julia King
- Euleena MacLachlan
- Karri McMahon
- Gabrielle Nance
- Emily Naylor
- Georgina Parker
- Tegan Richards
- Ashleigh Robertson
- Courtney Rudd
- Eloise Sobels
- Caitlin Watkins (GK)
(Tasmania) Tassie Van Demons
(Victoria (state)) VIC Vipers
- Laura Barden
- Megan Berriman
- Carla Bond
- Anna Burns
- Alana Butler
- Kary Chau
- Hannah Cohen
- Laura Desmet
- Stephanie Doutre
- Stacia Joseph (C)
- Rachael Lynch (GK)
- Claire Messent
- Hayley Padget
- Hana Peake (GK)
- Meg Pearce
- Stephanie Riordan
- Danielle Schubach
- Samantha Snow
(Western Australia) WA Diamonds
- Jemma Buckley
- Olivia Chiu
- Paige Collins (GK)
- Kate Denning
- Jessica Esslemont
- Rachel Frusher
- Kyra Flynn
- Shelley Liddelow
- Kobie McGurk (C)
- Ashleigh Nelson
- Shayni Nelson
- Airlie Ogilvie
- Caitlin Pascov
- Jodie Searle
- Kathryn Slattery
- Penny Squibb
- Katy Symons
- Ashlee Wells (GK)

== Results ==
=== First round ===
==== Pool A ====
Pos	Team	Pld	W	D	L	GF	GA	GD	Pts	Qualification
1	(Western Australia) WA Diamonds	3	3	0	0	8	1	+7	9	Advance to Medal Round
2	(Australian Capital Territory) Canberra Strikers	3	2	0	1	4	1	+3	6	Advance to Medal Round
3	(Victoria (state)) VIC Vipers	3	1	0	2	8	6	+2	3	5th to 8th Classification
4	(Tasmania) Tassie Van Demons	3	0	0	3	1	13	−12	0	5th to 8th Classification

27 September 2013
17:00

Victorian Vipers (Victoria (state))	0–1	(Australian Capital Territory) Canberra Strikers
	Report	Flanagan 62'

Tasmanian Hockey Centre

27 September 2013
19:00

WA Diamonds (Western Australia)	3–0	(Tasmania) Tassie Van Demons
Esselmont 1'; Ogilvie 38'; Squibb 66'	Report

Tasmanian Hockey Centre

29 September 2013
11:00

Canberra Strikers (Australian Capital Territory)	3–0	(Tasmania) Tassie Van Demons
Cartwright 19'; Watson 31'; Bone 50'	Report

Tasmanian Hockey Centre

29 September 2013
15:00

WA Diamonds (Western Australia)	4–1	(Victoria (state)) Victorian Vipers
Squibb 25'; S. Nelson 34'; Esselmont 37'; Pascov 55'	Report	Bond 69'

Tasmanian Hockey Centre

1 October 2013
11:00

WA Diamonds (Western Australia)	1–0	(Australian Capital Territory) Canberra Strikers
Chiu 21'	Report

Tasmanian Hockey Centre

1 October 2013
17:00

Victorian Vipers (Victoria (state))	7–1	(Tasmania) Tassie Van Demons
Cohen 5', 68'; Messent 16'; Desmet 20'; Barden 26'; Riordan 34', 65'	Report	Ikin 43'

Tasmanian Hockey Centre

==== Pool B ====
Pos	Team	Pld	W	D	L	GF	GA	GD	Pts	Qualification
1	(Queensland) QLD Scorchers	3	2	1	0	10	2	+8	7	Advance to Medal Round
2	(New South Wales) NSW Arrows	3	2	1	0	10	4	+6	7	Advance to Medal Round
3	(South Australia) SA Suns	3	1	0	2	6	5	+1	3	5th to 8th Classification
4	(Northern Territory) NT Pearls	3	0	0	3	1	16	−15	0	5th to 8th Classification

27 September 2013
17:00

NSW Arrows (New South Wales)	3–1	(South Australia) SA Suns
Morgan 15'; White 44'; Webster 65'	Report	Parker 54'

Tasmanian Hockey Centre

27 September 2013
19:00

QLD Scorchers (Queensland)	6–0	(Northern Territory) NT Pearls
Fitzpatrick 24'; Blyth 40'; Reuter 43'; Schulz 50', 53'; Ashton 69'	Report

Tasmanian Hockey Centre

29 September 2013
13:00

SA Suns (South Australia)	5–0	(Northern Territory) NT Pearls
15'; Rudd 29'; McMahon 42'; Evans 53'; Parker 63'	Report

Tasmanian Hockey Centre

29 September 2013
17:00

QLD Scorchers (Queensland)	2–2	(New South Wales) NSW Arrows
Blyth 12'; Kerr 38'	Report	Webster 35'; Eastham 50'

Tasmanian Hockey Centre

1 October 2013
13:00

NSW Arrows (New South Wales)	5–1	(Northern Territory) NT Pearls
Morgan 22'; Close 37'; Pearce 42'; 46'; Miller 50'	Report	Liddy 64'

Tasmanian Hockey Centre

1 October 2013
15:00

SA Suns (South Australia)	0–2	(Queensland) QLD Scorchers
	Report	Larosa 17'; Reuter 25'

Tasmanian Hockey Centre

=== Second round ===
==== Pool C (Medal Round) ====
Pos	Team	Pld	W	D	L	GF	GA	GD	Pts
1	(Queensland) QLD Scorchers	3	2	1	0	4	2	+2	7
2	(Western Australia) WA Diamonds	3	2	0	1	4	3	+1	6
3	(New South Wales) NSW Arrows	3	1	1	1	7	6	+1	4
4	(Australian Capital Territory) Canberra Strikers	3	0	0	3	1	5	−4	0

2 October 2013
17:00

Canberra Strikers (Australian Capital Territory)	1–3	(New South Wales) NSW Arrows
Cartwright 4'	Report	White 21', 28'; Hurtz 46'

Tasmanian Hockey Centre

2 October 2013
19:00

WA Diamonds (Western Australia)	0–1	(Queensland) QLD Scorchers
	Report	Kershaw 56'

Tasmanian Hockey Centre

4 October 2013
15:00

WA Diamonds (Western Australia)	3–2	(New South Wales) NSW Arrows
35'; Buckley 43'; A. Nelson 70'	Report	Carmichael 24'; Close 64'

Tasmanian Hockey Centre

4 October 2013
17:00

Canberra Strikers (Australian Capital Territory)	0–1	(Queensland) QLD Scorchers
	Report	Schulz 33'

Tasmanian Hockey Centre

==== Pool D (Classification Round) ====
Pos	Team	Pld	W	D	L	GF	GA	GD	Pts
1	(Victoria (state)) VIC Vipers	3	3	0	0	12	2	+10	9
2	(South Australia) SA Suns	3	2	0	1	10	3	+7	6
3	(Northern Territory) NT Pearls	3	1	0	2	3	10	−7	3
4	(Tasmania) TAS Van Demons	3	0	0	3	4	14	−10	0

2 October 2013
13:00

TAS Van Demons (Tasmania)	2–3	(Northern Territory) NT Pearls
Divin 45', 68'	Report	Peris 18'; Sutherland 67'; Morrison 70'

Tasmanian Hockey Centre

2 October 2013
15:00

VIC Vipers (Victoria (state))	2–1	(South Australia) SA Suns
Desmet 3'; Joseph 50'	Report	Claxton 37'

Tasmanian Hockey Centre

4 October 2013
11:00

TAS Van Demons (Tasmania)	1–4	(South Australia) SA Suns
13'	Report	Roberson 16'; McMahon 28'; Rudd 37'; Naylor 55'

Tasmanian Hockey Centre

4 October 2013
13:00

VIC Vipers (Victoria (state))	3–0	(Northern Territory) NT Pearls
Riordan 5'; Schubach 19'; Chau 61'	Report

Tasmanian Hockey Centre

=== Classification matches ===
==== Seventh and eighth place ====
5 October 2013
10:30

NT Pearls (Northern Territory)	1–4	(Tasmania) TAS Van Demons
Peris 7'	Report	Ikin 39'; Reid 45'; McCambridge 48'; Jones 55'

Tasmanian Hockey Centre

==== Fifth and Sixth place ====
5 October 2013
12:30

VIC Vipers (Victoria (state))	2–1	(South Australia) SA Suns
Messent 18', 21'	Report	Roberson 45'

Tasmanian Hockey Centre

==== Third and fourth place ====
5 October 2013
14:30

NSW Arrows (New South Wales)	5–1	(Australian Capital Territory) Canberra Strikers
Webster 4', 35'; Pearce 53', 70'; Close 65'	Report	Evans 64'

Tasmanian Hockey Centre

==== Final ====
5 October 2013
16:30

WA Diamonds (Western Australia)	0–0	(Queensland) QLD Scorchers
	Report
Penalties
Symons (penalty shoot-out missed); A. Nelson (penalty shoot-out missed); Buckley (penalty shoot-out missed); Ogilvie (penalty shoot-out missed)	0–2	(penalty shoot-out scored) Schulz; (penalty shoot-out scored) Fey; (penalty shoot-out missed) Blyth; (penalty shoot-out missed) Holzberger

Tasmanian Hockey Centre

== Awards ==
Player of the Tournament	Top Goalscorer	Goalkeeper of the Tournament	Play the Whistle
(South Australia) Karri McMahon	(New South Wales) Hollie Webster	(Western Australia) Ashlee Wells	(Northern Territory) NT Pearls

== Statistics ==
=== Final standings ===
Pos	Team	Pld	W	D	L	GF	GA	GD	Pts	Final Result
1st place, gold medalist(s)	(Queensland) QLD Scorchers	6	4	2	0	12	2	+10	14	Gold Medal
2nd place, silver medalist(s)	(Western Australia) WA Diamonds	6	4	1	1	11	4	+7	13	Silver Medal
3rd place, bronze medalist(s)	(New South Wales) NSW Arrows	6	4	1	1	20	9	+11	13	Bronze Medal
4	(Australian Capital Territory) Canberra Strikers	6	2	0	4	6	10	−4	6	Fourth Place
5	(Victoria (state)) VIC Vipers	6	4	0	2	15	8	+7	12	Fifth place
6	(South Australia) SA Suns	6	2	0	4	12	10	+2	6	Sixth Place
7	(Tasmania) Tassie Van Demons	6	1	0	5	8	21	−13	3	Seventh Place
8	(Northern Territory) NT Pearls	6	1	0	5	5	25	−20	3	Eighth Place

=== Goalscorers ===
There were 89 goals scored in 24 matches, for an average of 3.71 goals per match.

4 goals

- (New South Wales) Hollie Webster

3 goals

- (New South Wales) Jade Close
- (New South Wales) Kirsten Pearce
- (New South Wales) Kellie White
- (Queensland) Jodie Schulz
- (Victoria (state)) Stephanie Riordan
- (Victoria (state)) Claire Messent

2 goals

- (Australian Capital Territory) Jenna Cartwright
- (New South Wales) Georgina Morgan
- (Northern Territory) Brooke Peris
- (Queensland) Madonna Blyth
- (Queensland) Rebecca Reuter
- (South Australia) Karri McMahon
- (South Australia) Georgie Parker
- (South Australia) Ashleigh Roberson
- (South Australia) Courtney Rudd
- (Tasmania) Emily Divin
- (Tasmania) Brigit Ikin
- (Victoria (state)) Hannah Cohen
- (Victoria (state)) Laura Desmet
- (Western Australia) Jess Esslemont
- (Western Australia) Penny Squibb

1 goal

- (Australian Capital Territory) Edwina Bone
- (Australian Capital Territory) Naomi Evans
- (Australian Capital Territory) Anna Flanagan
- (Australian Capital Territory) Shelley Watson
- (New South Wales) Mathilda Carmichael
- (New South Wales) Casey Eastham
- (New South Wales) Emily Hurtz
- (New South Wales) Rachel Miller
- (Northern Territory) Candice Liddy
- (Northern Territory) Ashleigh Morrison
- (Northern Territory) Danielle Sutherland
- (Queensland) Renee Ashton
- (Queensland) Madison Fitzpatrick
- (Queensland) Alyssa Kerr
- (Queensland) Stephanie Kershaw
- (Queensland) Jasmine Larosa
- (South Australia) Jane Claxton
- (South Australia) Holly Evans
- (South Australia) Emily Naylor
- (Tasmania) Jackie Jones
- (Tasmania) Sarah McCambridge
- (Tasmania) Julia Reid
- (Victoria (state)) Laura Barden
- (Victoria (state)) Carla Bond
- (Victoria (state)) Kary Chau
- (Victoria (state)) Stacia Joseph
- (Victoria (state)) Danielle Schubach
- (Western Australia) Jemma Buckley
- (Western Australia) Olivia Chiu
- (Western Australia) Ashleigh Nelson
- (Western Australia) Shayni Nelson
- (Western Australia) Airlie Ogilvie
- (Western Australia) Caitlin Pascov

1 own goal

- (New South Wales) NSW Arrows (Against NT Pearls)
- (South Australia) SA Suns (Against NT Pearls)
- (Tasmania) Tassie Van Demons (Against SA Suns)
- (Western Australia) WA Diamonds (Against NSW Arrows)
