= 2014 Women's Australian Hockey League =

Tournament details
- Host country: Australia
- City: Brisbane
- Teams: 8
- Venue: Queensland State Hockey Centre

Final positions
- Champions: (New South Wales) NSW Arrows (9th title)
- Runner-up: (Queensland) QLD Scorchers
- Third place: (Victoria (state)) VIC Vipers

Tournament statistics
- Matches played: 24
- Goals scored: 94 (3.92 per match)
- Top scorer: (Queensland) Jodie Kenny (9 goals)
- Best player: (New South Wales) Casey Sablowski

The 2014 Women's Australian Hockey League was the 22nd edition of the women's field hockey tournament. The tournament was held in the Queensland city of Brisbane.

The New South Wales Arrows won the gold medal for the ninth time by defeating the Queensland Scorchers 3–2 in the final.

== Competition format ==
The tournament is divided into two pools, Pool A and Pool B, consisting of four teams in a round-robin format. Teams then progress into either Pool C, the medal round, or Pool D, the classification round. Teams carry over points from their previous match ups, and contest teams they are yet to play.

The top two teams in each of pools A and B then progress to Pool C. The top two teams in Pool C continue to contest the Final, while the bottom two teams of Pool C play in the Third and Fourth-place match.

The remaining bottom placing teams make up Pool D. The top two teams in Pool D play in the Fifth and Sixth-place match, while the bottom two teams of Pool C play in the Seventh and Eighth-place match.

== Teams ==
- (Australian Capital Territory) Canberra Strikers
- New South Wales Arrows
- (Northern Territory) NT Pearls
- Queensland Scorchers
- (South Australia) SA Suns
- (Tasmania) Tassie Van Demons
- (Victoria (state)) Victorian Vipers
- (Western Australia) WA Diamonds

== Results ==
=== First round ===
==== Pool A ====
Pos	Team	Pld	W	D	L	GF	GA	GD	Pts	Qualification
1	(Queensland) QLD Scorchers	3	3	0	0	10	2	+8	9	Advance to Medal Round
2	(Victoria (state)) VIC Vipers	3	2	0	1	6	1	+5	6	Advance to Medal Round
3	(Australian Capital Territory) Canberra Strikers	3	1	0	2	9	5	+4	3	
4	(Northern Territory) NT Pearls	3	0	0	3	0	17	−17	0	

Source: Hockey Australia

4 October 2014
13:30

QLD Scorchers (Queensland)	4–2	(Australian Capital Territory) Canberra Strikers
Kenny 15', 32', 44'; R. Dwyer 60'	Report	M. Bone 24'; Gray 45'

Queensland State Hockey Centre
Umpires:
Sarah Allanson
Rhianon Fernando

4 October 2014
17:30

VIC Vipers (Victoria (state))	5–0	(Northern Territory) NT Pearls
Nanscawen 32', 40'; Barden 35'; Joseph 38'; Snow 50'	Report

Queensland State Hockey Centre
Umpires:
Lynn Cowie-McAlister
Bernadette Pangrazio

5 October 2014
13:30

Canberra Strikers (Australian Capital Territory)	7–0	(Northern Territory) NT Pearls
Flanagan 30', 49'; Evans 37'; Smith 44'; E. Bone 45'; Cartwright 54'; Gillis 60'	Report

Queensland State Hockey Centre
Umpires:
Janelle Bond
Emily Carroll

5 October 2014
17:30

QLD Scorchers (Queensland)	1–0	(Victoria (state)) VIC Vipers
Kenny 18'	Report

Queensland State Hockey Centre
Umpires:
Melissa Trivic
Rhiannon Murrie

7 October 2014
13:30

Canberra Strikers (Australian Capital Territory)	0–1	(Victoria (state)) VIC Vipers
	Report	Joseph 25'

Queensland State Hockey Centre
Umpires:
Melissa Trivic
Aleisha Neumann

7 October 2014
17:30

QLD Scorchers (Queensland)	5–0	(Northern Territory) NT Pearls
J. Dwyer 14'; Fey 39'; Lammon 41'; Kenny 45'; Allendorf 56'	Report

Queensland State Hockey Centre
Umpires:
Rhianon Fernando
Sarah Allanson

==== Pool B ====
Pos	Team	Pld	W	D	L	GF	GA	GD	Pts	Qualification
1	(New South Wales) NSW Arrows	3	3	0	0	12	1	+11	9	Advance to Medal Round
2	(Western Australia) WA Diamonds	3	2	0	1	11	3	+8	6	Advance to Medal Round
3	(South Australia) SA Suns	3	0	1	2	3	9	−6	1	
4	(Tasmania) Tassie Van Demons	3	0	1	2	1	14	−13	1	

Source: Hockey Australia

4 October 2014
15:30

WA Diamonds (Western Australia)	0–2	(New South Wales) NSW Arrows
	Report	Webster 25'; Morgan 47'

Queensland State Hockey Centre
Umpires:
Melissa Trivic
Emily Carroll

4 October 2014
19:30

SA Suns (South Australia)	1–1	(Tasmania) Tassie Van Demons
Roberson 8'	Report	McCambridge 48'

Queensland State Hockey Centre
Umpires:
Janelle Bond
Rhiannon Murrie

5 October 2014
15:30

WA Diamonds (Western Australia)	4–1	(South Australia) SA Suns
Buckley 9'; Ogilvie 13'; Symons 57'; Slattery 60'	Report	Evans 42'

Queensland State Hockey Centre
Umpires:
Aleisha Neumann
Rhianon Fernando

5 October 2014
19:30

NSW Arrows (New South Wales)	6–0	(Tasmania) Tassie Van Demons
Close 2'; Smith 34'; Pearce 36'; Morgan 39'; McLeish 41'; White 50'	Report

Queensland State Hockey Centre
Umpires:
Bernadette Pangrazio
Sarah Allanson

7 October 2014
15:30

WA Diamonds (Western Australia)	7–0	(Tasmania) Tassie Van Demons
Slattery 6', 8', 59'; Buckley 36'; Pascov 41'; Esslemont 44'; Squibb 48'	Report

Queensland State Hockey Centre
Umpires:
Rhiannon Murrie
Bernadette Pangrazio

7 October 2014
19:30

NSW Arrows (New South Wales)	4–1	(South Australia) SA Suns
Pearce 23'; Sablowski 33'; White 50'; Webster 53'	Report	Buchecker 39'

Queensland State Hockey Centre
Umpires:
Lynn Cowie-McAlister
Janelle Bond

=== Second round ===
==== Pool C (Medal Round) ====
Pos	Team	Pld	W	D	L	GF	GA	GD	Pts
1	(Queensland) QLD Scorchers	3	2	1	0	5	2	+3	7
2	(New South Wales) NSW Arrows	3	2	1	0	4	1	+3	7
3	(Victoria (state)) VIC Vipers	3	0	1	2	2	4	−2	1
4	(Western Australia) WA Diamonds	3	0	1	2	3	7	−4	1

Source: Hockey Australia

8 October 2014
17:30

VIC Vipers (Victoria (state))	2–2	(Western Australia) WA Diamonds
Desmet 31'; Ockenden 47'	Report	Buckley 3', 52'

Queensland State Hockey Centre
Umpires:
Lisa Roach
Aleisha Neumann

8 October 2014
19:30

QLD Scorchers (Queensland)	1–1	(New South Wales) NSW Arrows
Kenny 44'	Report	Sablowski 58'

Queensland State Hockey Centre
Umpires:
Sarah Allanson
Emily Carroll

10 October 2014
17:30

QLD Scorchers (Queensland)	3–1	(Western Australia) WA Diamonds
J. Dwyer 17'; Kenny 57', 57'	Report	Esslemont 44'

Queensland State Hockey Centre
Umpires:
Lisa Roach
Emily Carroll

10 October 2014
19:30

VIC Vipers (Victoria (state))	0–1	(New South Wales) NSW Arrows
	Report	Close 1'

Queensland State Hockey Centre
Umpires:
Lynn Cowie-McAlister
Bernadette Pangrazio

==== Pool D (Classification Round) ====
Pos	Team	Pld	W	D	L	GF	GA	GD	Pts
1	(Australian Capital Territory) Canberra Strikers	3	3	0	0	18	3	+15	9
2	(South Australia) SA Suns	3	1	1	1	7	7	0	4
3	(Tasmania) Tassie Van Demons	3	1	1	1	4	7	−3	4
4	(Northern Territory) NT Pearls	3	0	0	3	1	13	−12	0

Source: Hockey Australia

8 October 2014
13:30

NT Pearls (Northern Territory)	0–2	(Tasmania) Tassie Van Demons
	Report	Taylor 12'; Reid 45'

Queensland State Hockey Centre
Umpires:
Rhianon Fernando
Rhiannon Murrie

8 October 2014
15:30

Canberra Strikers (Australian Capital Territory)	5–2	(South Australia) SA Suns
Evans 8', 13'; Cartwright 15'; Gray 60'; E. Bone 53'	Report	Nance 47'; Roberson 60'

Queensland State Hockey Centre
Umpires:
Janelle Bond
Lynn Cowie-McAlister

10 October 2014
13:30

NT Pearls (Northern Territory)	1–4	(South Australia) SA Suns
Hillas 13'	Report	Webster 7', 32'; Evans 50'; Spano 52'

Queensland State Hockey Centre
Umpires:
Aleisha Neumann
Rhiannon Murrie

10 October 2014
15:30

Canberra Strikers (Australian Capital Territory)	6–1	(Tasmania) Tassie Van Demons
Gillis 12', 22'; Evans 13'; Gray 25', 26'; M. Bone 53'	Report	Patten 45'

Queensland State Hockey Centre
Umpires:
Sarah Allanson
Rhianon Fernando

=== Classification Games ===
==== Seventh and eighth place ====
11 October 2014
12:30

Tassie Van Demons (Tasmania)	0–1	(Northern Territory) NT Pearls
	Report	Massini 50'

Queensland State Hockey Centre
Umpires:
Rhiannon Murrie
Janelle Bond

==== Fifth and sixth place ====
11 October 2014
14:30

Canberra Strikers (Australian Capital Territory)	1–0	(South Australia) SA Suns
Gillis 23'	Report

Queensland State Hockey Centre
Umpires:
Sarah Allanson
Bernadette Pangrazio

==== Third and fourth place ====
11 October 2014
16:30

VIC Vipers (Victoria (state))	3–0	(Western Australia) WA Diamonds
Nanscawen 23'; Brugts 52'; Padget 58'	Report

Queensland State Hockey Centre
Umpires:
Lynn Cowie-McAlister
Emily Carroll

==== Final ====
11 October 2014
18:30

QLD Scorchers (Queensland)	2–3	(New South Wales) NSW Arrows
Holzberger 20'; Kenny 21'	Report	Smith 42', 44'; Williams 46'

Queensland State Hockey Centre
Umpires:
Lisa Roach
Aleisha Neumann

== Awards ==
Player of the Tournament	Top Goalscorer	Player of the Final
(New South Wales) Casey Sablowski	(Queensland) Jodie Kenny	(New South Wales) Casey Sablowski

== Statistics ==
=== Final standings ===
Pos	Team	Pld	W	D	L	GF	GA	GD	Pts	Final Result
1st place, gold medalist(s)	(New South Wales) NSW Arrows	6	5	1	0	17	4	+13	16	Gold Medal
2nd place, silver medalist(s)	(Queensland) QLD Scorchers	6	4	1	1	16	7	+9	13	Silver Medal
3rd place, bronze medalist(s)	(Victoria (state)) VIC Vipers	6	3	1	2	11	4	+7	10	Bronze Medal
4	(Western Australia) WA Diamonds	6	2	1	3	14	11	+3	7	
5	(Australian Capital Territory) Canberra Strikers	6	4	0	2	21	8	+13	12	
6	(South Australia) SA Suns	6	1	1	4	9	16	−7	4	
7	(Northern Territory) NT Pearls	6	1	0	5	2	23	−21	3	
8	(Tasmania) Tassie Van Demons	6	1	1	4	4	21	−17	4	

Source: Hockey Australia

=== Goalscorers ===
There were 94 goals scored in 24 matches, for an average of 3.92 goals per match.

9 goals

- (Queensland) Jodie Kenny

4 goals

- (Australian Capital Territory) Naomi Evans
- (Australian Capital Territory) Katherine Gillis
- (Australian Capital Territory) Laura Gray
- (Western Australia) Jemma Buckley
- (Western Australia) Kathryn Slattery

3 goals

- (New South Wales) Emily Smith
- (Victoria (state)) Georgia Nanscawen

2 goals

- (Australian Capital Territory) Meredith Bone
- (Australian Capital Territory) Edwina Bone
- (Australian Capital Territory) Jenna Cartwright
- (Australian Capital Territory) Anna Flanagan
- (New South Wales) Jade Close
- (New South Wales) Georgina Morgan
- (New South Wales) Kirsten Pearce
- (New South Wales) Casey Sablowski
- (New South Wales) Hollie Webster
- (New South Wales) Kellie White
- (Queensland) Jill Dwyer
- (South Australia) Holly Evans
- (South Australia) Ashleigh Roberson
- (South Australia) Petrea Webster
- (Victoria (state)) Stacia Joseph
- (Western Australia) Jessica Esslemont

1 goal

- (Australian Capital Territory) Jessica Smith
- (New South Wales) Emma McLeish
- (New South Wales) Mariah Williams
- (Northern Territory) Georgia Hillas
- (Northern Territory) Danica Massini
- (Queensland) Murphy Allendorf
- (Queensland) Rebecca Dwyer
- (Queensland) Ashlea Fey
- (Queensland) Jordyn Holzberger
- (Queensland) Kazzia Lammon
- (South Australia) Brooklyn Buchecker
- (South Australia) Gabrielle Nance
- (South Australia) Michaela Spano
- (Tasmania) Sarah McCambridge
- (Tasmania) Blair Patten
- (Tasmania) Hannah Reid
- (Tasmania) Renee Taylor
- (Victoria (state)) Laura Barden
- (Victoria (state)) Pauline Brugts
- (Victoria (state)) Laura Desmet
- (Victoria (state)) Lucy Ockenden
- (Victoria (state)) Hayley Padget
- (Victoria (state)) Samantha Snow
- (Western Australia) Caitlin Pascov
- (Western Australia) Airlie Ogilvie
- (Western Australia) Penny Squibb
- (Western Australia) Katy Symons

Source: Hockey Australia
