= 2017 Women's Australian Hockey League =

Tournament details
- Host country: Australia
- City: Perth
- Dates: 28 September – 8 October
- Teams: 10
- Venue: Perth Hockey Stadium

Final positions
- Champions: (Victoria (state)) VIC Vipers (3rd title)
- Runner-up: (Queensland) QLD Scorchers
- Third place: (New South Wales) NSW Arrows

Tournament statistics
- Matches played: 35
- Goals scored: 124 (3.54 per match)
- Top scorer(s): (New South Wales) Emily Smith (Victoria (state)) Emily Hurtz (Western Australia) Penny Squibb (7 goals)
- Best player: (Queensland) Stephanie Kershaw
- Best goalkeeper: (Victoria (state)) Rachael Lynch

The 2017 Women's Australian Hockey League was the 25th edition of women's field hockey tournament. The tournament was held in Perth, Western Australia between 28 September – 8 October.

In the 2017 edition, invitational teams from New Zealand and India competed in the tournament alongside the Australian states and territories.

VIC Vipers won the tournament for the third time, by defeating defending champions QLD Scorchers 2–1 in a penalty shoot-out, after the final finished a 2–2 draw. NSW Arrows won the bronze medal after defeating the NZL Development team 3–1 in the third and fourth playoff.

== Competition format ==
Teams are split evenly into pools A and B where they compete in a single round-robin format.

At the conclusion of the initial pool stage, the top two teams in each pool progress to the medal playoffs in Pool C, while the remaining six teams progress to the classification matches in Pool D.

In Pool D, teams carry over points earned in previous matches and contest the teams they are yet to play. Final ranking in Pool D determines the final tournament standing from fifth to tenth place.

In Pool C, teams carry over points earned in previous matches and contest the teams they are yet to play. The top two teams then progress to the final, while the bottom two teams contest the third and fourth place playoff.

== Participating teams ==
Dates	Event	Location	Qualifier(s)
Host state			(Western Australia) WA Diamonds
29 September – 8 October 2016	2016 Women's AHL	(Western Australia) Perth, WA	(Australian Capital Territory) Canberra Strikers (New South Wales) NSW Arrows (Northern Territory) NT Pearls (Queensland) QLD Scorchers (South Australia) SA Suns (Tasmania) Tassie Van Demons (Victoria (state)) VIC Vipers
Invitational Teams			India; New Zealand

== Results ==
All times are in AWST: (UTC+08:00)

=== First round ===
==== Pool A ====
Pos	Team	Pld	W	D	L	GF	GA	GD	Pts	Qualification
1	(Queensland) QLD Scorchers	4	3	1	0	13	3	+10	10	Medal Round
2	NZL Development	4	3	0	1	5	3	+2	9	Medal Round
3	(Western Australia) WA Diamonds	4	2	0	2	11	7	+4	6	
4	(Australian Capital Territory) Canberra Strikers	4	0	2	2	5	9	−4	2	
5	(Northern Territory) NT Pearls	4	0	1	3	2	14	−12	1	

Source: hockeyaustralia.altiusrt.com

28 September 2017
14:00

WA Diamonds (Western Australia)	4–2	(Australian Capital Territory) Canberra Strikers
Clarke 31'; Squibb 33', 38', 49'	Report	Gray 19'; Deacon 24'

Perth Hockey Stadium: Pitch 2
Umpires:
Melissa Trivic (AUS)
Michelle Farnill (AUS)

28 September 2017
16:00

QLD Scorchers (Queensland)	5–0	(Northern Territory) NT Pearls
Dwyer 2'; Taylor 36', 52'; Fey 53'; Lammon 57'	Report

Perth Hockey Stadium: Pitch 2
Umpires:
Kylie Seymour (AUS)
Kristy Robertson (AUS)

29 September 2017
17:00

QLD Scorchers (Queensland)	3–0	NZL Development
Fey 13'; S. Fitzpatrick 16'; Kershaw 27'	Report

Perth Hockey Stadium: Pitch 1
Umpires:
Kylie Seymour (AUS)
Nicola Brown (AUS)

30 September 2017
17:30

WA Diamonds (Western Australia)	5–0	(Northern Territory) NT Pearls
Slattery 12', 32'; Frusher 27'; Squibb 33'; Broek 37'	Report

Perth Hockey Stadium: Pitch 1
Umpires:
Tamara Leonard (AUS)
Bernadette Pangrazio (AUS)

30 September 2017
19:30

Canberra Strikers (Australian Capital Territory)	0–2	NZL Development
	Report	Hull 36'; Ritchie 58'

Perth Hockey Stadium: Pitch 1
Umpires:
Aleisha Neumann (AUS)
Kylie Seymour (AUS)

1 October 2017
15:00

WA Diamonds (Western Australia)	2–4	(Queensland) QLD Scorchers
Squibb 6'; Slattery 60'	Report	Fey 8'; Greiner 23'; Kershaw 29'; S. Fitzpatrick 51'

Perth Hockey Stadium: Pitch 1
Umpires:
Kylie Seymour (AUS)
Emily Carroll (AUS)

2 October 2017
13:30

NT Pearls (Northern Territory)	0–2	NZL Development
	Report	Steele 6'; Curtis 36'

Perth Hockey Stadium: Pitch 1
Umpires:
Shweta Patil (IND)
Janelle Bond (AUS)

2 October 2017
15:30

Canberra Strikers (Australian Capital Territory)	1–1	(Queensland) QLD Scorchers
Gray 9'	Report	M. Fitzpatrick 17'

Perth Hockey Stadium: Pitch 1
Umpires:
Kristy Robertson (AUS)
Kerryl Chandler (AUS)

3 October 2017
13:00

Canberra Strikers (Australian Capital Territory)	2–2	(Northern Territory) NT Pearls
Evans 24'; Commerford 49'	Report	Johansen 50', 56'

Perth Hockey Stadium: Pitch 2
Umpires:
Nicola Brown (AUS)
Kerryl Chandler (AUS)

3 October 2017
15:00

NZL Development	1–0	(Western Australia) WA Diamonds
Ivory 57'	Report

Perth Hockey Stadium: Pitch 2
Umpires:
Janelle Bond (AUS)
Michelle Farnill (AUS)

==== Pool B ====
Pos	Team	Pld	W	D	L	GF	GA	GD	Pts	Qualification
1	(Victoria (state)) VIC Vipers	4	4	0	0	15	4	+11	12	Medal Round
2	(New South Wales) NSW Arrows	4	2	1	1	12	5	+7	7	Medal Round
3	(South Australia) SA Suns	4	2	1	1	10	6	+4	7	
4	IND Development	4	1	0	3	3	13	−10	3	
5	(Tasmania) Tassie Van Demons	4	0	0	4	0	12	−12	0	

Source: hockeyaustralia.altiusrt.com

28 September 2017
10:00

Tassie Van Demons (Tasmania)	0–2	(New South Wales) NSW Arrows
	Report	E. Smith 25'; Wilson 52'

Perth Hockey Stadium: Pitch 2
Umpires:
Kerryl Chandler (AUS)
Tamara Leonard (AUS)

28 September 2017
12:00

VIC Vipers (Victoria (state))	4–1	(South Australia) SA Suns
Breen 29'; Gravenall 39'; Hurtz 42'; Ratcliffe 43'	Report	Spano 49'

Perth Hockey Stadium: Pitch 2
Umpires:
Bernadette Pangrazio (AUS)
Aleisha Neumann (AUS)

29 September 2017
15:00

VIC Vipers (Victoria (state))	3–1	IND Development
Hurtz 22'; Utri 41'; Ratcliffe 55'	Report	Dubey 47'

Perth Hockey Stadium: Pitch 1
Umpires:
Aleisha Neumann (AUS)
Emily Carroll (AUS)

29 September 2017
19:00

Tassie Van Demons (Tasmania)	0–5	(South Australia) SA Suns
	Report	Spano 6'; McMahon 30', 34'; Shand 50'; Penington 53'

Perth Hockey Stadium: Pitch 2
Umpires:
Melissa Trivic (AUS)
Shweta Patil (IND)

30 September 2017
15:30

NSW Arrows (New South Wales)	7–0	IND Development
E. Smith 2', 48'; Schonell 6'; Hemmingway 12'; Watterson 18'; Nobbs 46'; Wilson 52'	Report

Perth Hockey Stadium: Pitch 1
Umpires:
Melissa Trivic (AUS)
Kerryl Chandler (AUS)

1 October 2017
13:00

Tassie Van Demons (Tasmania)	0–4	(Victoria (state)) VIC Vipers
	Report	Breen 5'; Ratcliffe 23'; Hurtz 35', 55'

Perth Hockey Stadium: Pitch 1
Umpires:
Kristy Robertson (AUS)
Nicola Brown (AUS)

2 October 2017
17:30

SA Suns (South Australia)	3–1	IND Development
McMahon 26', 44'; Blatchford 28'	Report	Thoudam 22'

Perth Hockey Stadium: Pitch 1
Umpires:
Bernadette Pangrazio (AUS)
Michelle Farnill (AUS)

2 October 2017
19:30

NSW Arrows (New South Wales)	2–4	(Victoria (state)) VIC Vipers
Watterson 28', 59'	Report	Ratcliffe 2', 19'; Brazel 34'; Hammond 57'

Perth Hockey Stadium: Pitch 1
Umpires:
Kylie Seymour (AUS)
Tamara Leonard (AUS)

3 October 2017
17:00

IND Development	1–0	(Tasmania) Tassie Van Demons
Sangita 19'	Report

Perth Hockey Stadium: Pitch 2
Umpires:
Melissa Trivic (AUS)
Tamara Leonard (AUS)

3 October 2017
19:00

NSW Arrows (New South Wales)	1–1	(South Australia) SA Suns
Wilson 59'	Report	K. Holland-Smith 43'

Perth Hockey Stadium: Pitch 2
Umpires:
Emily Carroll (AUS)
Kristy Robertson (AUS)

=== Second round ===
==== Fifth to tenth place classification ====
===== Pool D =====
Pos	Team	Pld	W	D	L	GF	GA	GD	Pts
1	(Western Australia) WA Diamonds	5	5	0	0	18	5	+13	15
2	(Australian Capital Territory) Canberra Strikers	5	3	1	1	10	6	+4	10
3	(South Australia) SA Suns	5	3	0	2	11	8	+3	9
4	(Northern Territory) NT Pearls	5	1	2	2	5	11	−6	5
5	IND Development	5	1	1	3	4	8	−4	4
6	(Tasmania) Tassie Van Demons	5	0	0	5	2	12	−10	0

Source: hockeyaustralia.altiusrt.com

5 October 2017
14:00

NT Pearls (Northern Territory)	0–2	(South Australia) SA Suns
	Report	MacLachlan 33'; Penington 39'

Perth Hockey Stadium: Pitch 2
Umpires:
Shweta Patil (IND)
Bernadette Pangrazio (AUS)

5 October 2017
16:00

Canberra Strikers (Australian Capital Territory)	1–0	(Tasmania) Tassie Van Demons
Gray 58'	Report

Perth Hockey Stadium: Pitch 2
Umpires:
Nicola Brown (AUS)
Tamara Leonard (AUS)

5 October 2017
18:00

WA Diamonds (Western Australia)	2–1	IND Development
Tonkin 13'; Frusher 19'	Report	Dubey 56'

Perth Hockey Stadium: Pitch 2
Umpires:
Janelle Bond (AUS)
Kristy Robertson (AUS)

6 October 2017
14:00

WA Diamonds (Western Australia)	3–1	(Tasmania) Tassie Van Demons
Tonkin 27'; Broek 27'; Squibb 48'	Report	McCambridge 33'

Perth Hockey Stadium: Pitch 2
Umpires:
Tamara Leonard (AUS)
Bernadette Pangrazio (AUS)

6 October 2017
16:00

NT Pearls (Northern Territory)	1–1	IND Development
Peris 15'	Report	Gagandeep 22'

Perth Hockey Stadium: Pitch 2
Umpires:
Emily Carroll (AUS)
Shweta Patil (AUS)

6 October 2017
18:00

Canberra Strikers (Australian Capital Territory)	3–0	(South Australia) SA Suns
Gray 30'; Bone 41'; Economos 56'	Report

Perth Hockey Stadium: Pitch 2
Umpires:
Kerryl Chandler (AUS)
Nicola Brown (AUS)

7 October 2017
12:00

NT Pearls (Northern Territory)	2–1	(Tasmania) Tassie Van Demons
Collard 36'; Capewell 40'	Report	King 17'

Perth Hockey Stadium: Pitch 1
Umpires:
Nicola Brown (AUS)
Emily Carroll (AUS)

7 October 2017
16:00

Canberra Strikers (Australian Capital Territory)	2–0	IND Development
Smith 18', 53'	Report

Perth Hockey Stadium: Pitch 1
Umpires:
Janelle Bond (AUS)
Tamara Leonard (AUS)

7 October 2017
20:00

WA Diamonds (Western Australia)	4–1	(South Australia) SA Suns
Slattery 7', 55'; Squibb 22'; Clarke 34'	Report	Hunt 60'

Perth Hockey Stadium: Pitch 1
Umpires:
Michelle Farnill (AUS)
Kristy Robertson (AUS)

==== First to fourth place classification ====
===== Pool C =====
Pos	Team	Pld	W	D	L	GF	GA	GD	Pts	Qualification
1	(Queensland) QLD Scorchers	3	3	0	0	8	1	+7	9	Final
2	(Victoria (state)) VIC Vipers	3	1	1	1	7	7	0	4	Final
3	(New South Wales) NSW Arrows	3	1	0	2	6	7	−1	3	
4	NZL Development	3	0	1	2	3	9	−6	1	

Source: hockeyaustralia.altiusrt.com

5 October 2017
12:00

NZL Development	2–2	(Victoria (state)) VIC Vipers
Ritchie 11'; Ivory 40'	Report	Nanscawen 29'; Hurtz 49'

Perth Hockey Stadium: Pitch 1
Umpires:
Kylie Seymour (AUS)
Emily Carroll (AUS)

5 October 2017
14:00

QLD Scorchers (Queensland)	2–0	(New South Wales) NSW Arrows
M. Fitzpatrick 4'; Kershaw 52'	Report

Perth Hockey Stadium: Pitch 1
Umpires:
Melissa Trivic (AUS)
Michelle Farnill (AUS)

6 October 2017
12:00

NZL Development	1–4	(New South Wales) NSW Arrows
Ivory 52'	Report	Wilson 28'; E. Smith 51', 54'; Schonell 57'

Perth Hockey Stadium: Pitch 1
Umpires:
Kristy Robertson (AUS)
Michelle Farnill (AUS)

6 October 2017
14:00

QLD Scorchers (Queensland)	3–1	(Victoria (state)) VIC Vipers
Wilkinson 11'; M. Fitzpatrick 31', 46'	Report	Hurtz 59'

Perth Hockey Stadium: Pitch 1
Umpires:
Melissa Trivic (AUS)
Janelle Bond (AUS)

===== Third and fourth place =====
8 October 2017
11:00

NSW Arrows (New South Wales)	3–1	NZL Development
E. Smith 12', 59'; Watterson 18'	Report	Tuilotolava 7'

Perth Hockey Stadium: Pitch 1
Umpires:
Bernadette Pangrazio (AUS)
Emily Carroll (AUS)

===== Final =====
8 October 2017
15:30

QLD Scorchers (Queensland)	2–2	(Victoria (state)) VIC Vipers
Taylor 51'; M. Fitzpatrick 53'	Report	Hurtz 15'; Nanscawen 60'
Penalties
Taylor (penalty shoot-out scored); S. Fitzpatrick (penalty shoot-out missed); Malone (penalty shoot-out missed); Kershaw (penalty shoot-out missed); Fey (penalty shoot-out missed)	1–2	(penalty shoot-out missed) van den Assem; (penalty shoot-out missed) Nanscawen; (penalty shoot-out missed) Bates; (penalty shoot-out scored) Hurtz; (penalty shoot-out scored) Hammond

Perth Hockey Stadium: Pitch 1
Umpires:
Kerryl Chandler (AUS)
Melissa Trivic (AUS)

== Awards ==
Best Player	Topscorer(s)	Player of the Final	Best Goalkeeper	Play the Whistle
(Queensland) Stephanie Kershaw	(New South Wales) Emily Smith (Victoria (state)) Emily Hurtz (Western Australia) Penny Squibb	(Victoria (state)) Rachael Lynch	(Victoria (state)) Rachael Lynch	(Victoria (state)) VIC Vipers

== Final standings ==
Pos	Team	Pld	W	D	L	GF	GA	GD	Pts	Final Result
1st place, gold medalist(s)	(Victoria (state)) VIC Vipers	7	4	2	1	20	11	+9	14	Gold Medal
2nd place, silver medalist(s)	(Queensland) QLD Scorchers	7	5	2	0	20	6	+14	17	Silver Medal
3rd place, bronze medalist(s)	(New South Wales) NSW Arrows	7	4	1	2	19	9	+10	13	Bronze Medal
4	(New Zealand) NZL Futures	7	3	1	3	9	12	−3	10	Fourth Place
5	(Western Australia) WA Diamonds	7	5	0	2	20	10	+10	15	Fifth Place
6	(Australian Capital Territory) Canberra Strikers	7	3	2	2	11	9	+2	11	Sixth Place
7	(South Australia) SA Suns	7	3	1	3	13	13	0	10	Seventh Place
8	(Northern Territory) NT Pearls	7	1	2	4	5	18	−13	5	Eighth Place
9	IND Development	7	1	1	5	5	18	−13	4	Ninth Place
10	(Tasmania) Tassie Van Demons	7	0	0	7	2	18	−16	0	Tenth Place

Source: hockeyaustralia.altiusrt.com

== Goalscorers ==
There were 124 goals scored in 35 matches, for an average of 3.54 goals per match.

7 goals

- (New South Wales) Emily Smith
- (Victoria (state)) Emily Hurtz
- (Western Australia) Penny Squibb

5 goals

- (Queensland) Madison Fitzpatrick
- (Victoria (state)) Madi Ratcliffe
- (Western Australia) Kathryn Slattery

4 goals

- (Australian Capital Territory) Laura Gray
- (New South Wales) Jessica Watterson
- (New South Wales) Abigail Wilson
- (South Australia) Karri McMahon

3 goals

- (New Zealand) Kate Ivory
- (Queensland) Ashlea Fey
- (Queensland) Stephanie Kershaw
- (Queensland) Renee Taylor

2 goals

- (Australian Capital Territory) Jessica Smith
- (India) Preeti Dubey
- (New South Wales) Courtney Schonell
- (New Zealand) Deanna Ritchie
- (Northern Territory) Karli Johansen
- (Queensland) Savannah Fitzpatrick
- (South Australia) Alison Penington
- (South Australia) Miki Spano
- (Victoria (state)) Sarah Breen
- (Victoria (state)) Georgia Nanscawen
- (Western Australia) Roos Broek
- (Western Australia) Katy Clarke
- (Western Australia) Rachel Frusher
- (Western Australia) Shanea Tonkin

1 goal

- (Australian Capital Territory) Meredith Bone
- (Australian Capital Territory) Kalindi Commerford
- (Australian Capital Territory) Ashleigh Deacon
- (Australian Capital Territory) Samantha Economos
- (Australian Capital Territory) Naomi Evans
- (India) Gagandeep Kaur
- (India) Sangita Kumari
- (India) Suman Thoudam
- (New South Wales) Jaime Hemmingway
- (New South Wales) Kaitlin Nobbs
- (New Zealand) Michaela Curtis
- (New Zealand) Megan Hull
- (New Zealand) Phoebe Steele
- (New Zealand) Louisa Tuilotolava
- (Northern Territory) Brooke Capewell
- (Northern Territory) Taylor Collard
- (Northern Territory) Brooke Peris
- (Queensland) Kirstin Dwyer
- (Queensland) Rebecca Greiner
- (Queensland) Kazzia Lammon
- (Queensland) Britt Wilkinson
- (South Australia) Kim Blatchford
- (South Australia) Kate Holland-Smith
- (South Australia) Amy Hunt
- (South Australia) Euleena MacLachlan
- (South Australia) Hattie Shand
- (Tasmania) Sarah McCambridge
- (Victoria (state)) Lily Brazel
- (Victoria (state)) Hannah Gravenall
- (Victoria (state)) Nicola Hammond
- (Victoria (state)) Aisling Utri

Source: Hockey Australia
