= 2011 Under 21 Women's Australian Hockey Championships =

2011 Women's Under 21 Australian Championships
Tournament details
- Host country: Australia
- City: Canberra
- Teams: 8
- Venue: National Hockey Centre

Final positions
- Champions: (Western Australia) WA
- Runner-up: (New South Wales) NSW
- Third place: (Queensland) QLD

Tournament statistics
- Matches played: 36
- Goals scored: 130 (3.61 per match)
- Top scorer: (Western Australia) Kathryn Slattery (9 goals)
- Best player: (Queensland) Alyssa Kerr

The 2011 Under 21 Women's Australian Championships was a women's field hockey tournament held in Australia's capital city, Canberra, from 12–23 July.

WA won the gold medal after defeating NSW 1–0 in the final. QLD won the bronze medal by defeating the VIC 1–0 in the third place match.

== Teams ==
- (Australian Capital Territory) ACT
- (New South Wales) NSW
- (Northern Territory) NT
- (Queensland) QLD
- (South Australia) SA
- (Tasmania) TAS
- (Victoria (state)) VIC
- (Western Australia) WA

== Results ==
=== Preliminary round ===
Pos	Team	Pld	W	D	L	GF	GA	GD	Pts	Qualification
1	(New South Wales) NSW	7	6	0	1	18	3	+15	18	Advance to Semi-finals
2	(Queensland) QLD	7	6	0	1	21	7	+14	18	Advance to Semi-finals
3	(Western Australia) WA	7	5	0	2	17	11	+6	15	Advance to Semi-finals
4	(Victoria (state)) VIC	7	4	1	2	16	12	+4	13	Advance to Semi-finals
5	(South Australia) SA	7	2	0	5	8	9	−1	6	
6	(Australian Capital Territory) ACT	7	1	2	4	10	21	−11	5	
7	(Northern Territory) NT	7	1	1	5	9	21	−12	4	
8	(Tasmania) TAS	7	0	2	5	8	23	−15	2	

Source: Hockey Australia
Rules for classification: 1) points; 2) matches won; 3) goal difference; 4) goals for; 5) head-to-head result; 6) field goals scored.

==== Fixtures ====
12 July 2011
10:00

WA (Western Australia)	4–1	(Northern Territory) NT
Symons 8'; Pascov 13'; Mead 29'; Slattery 37'	Report	Peris 3'

Stadium:
National Hockey Centre

12 July 2011
12:00

VIC (Victoria (state))	1–0	(South Australia) SA
Breen 62'	Report

Stadium:
National Hockey Centre

12 July 2011
14:00

ACT (Australian Capital Territory)	1–4	(Queensland) QLD
Cartwright 45'	Report	Fey 38', 70'; Olivieri 61', 68'

Stadium:
National Hockey Centre

12 July 2011
16:00

NSW (New South Wales)	5–0	(Tasmania) TAS
Watts 8'; Healy 16'; Pearce 29'; Simpson 35'; Fergusson 46'	Report

Stadium:
National Hockey Centre

13 July 2011
10:00

SA (South Australia)	4–1	(Northern Territory) NT
Claxton 36', 58'; Connolly 52'; Watters 55'	Report	Peris 45'

Stadium:
National Hockey Centre

13 July 2011
12:00

NSW (New South Wales)	3–0	(Australian Capital Territory) ACT
Simpson 12'; Watts 13'; Pearce 61'	Report

Stadium:
National Hockey Centre

13 July 2011
14:00

QLD (Queensland)	3–1	(Tasmania) TAS
Olivieri 21', 63'; Kershaw 67'	Report	Risk 53'

Stadium:
National Hockey Centre

13 July 2011
16:00

VIC (Victoria (state))	4–2	(Western Australia) WA
Breen 15'; Tuhan 26'; Pearce 29'; Boucher 63'	Report	Slattery 18'; Pascov 66'

Stadium:
National Hockey Centre

14 July 2011
10:00

TAS (Tasmania)	2–2	(Australian Capital Territory) ACT
Hopkins 12'; Grundy 54'	Report	Beard 15'; Lee 22'

Stadium:
National Hockey Centre

14 July 2011
12:00

QLD (Queensland)	1–2	(New South Wales) NSW
Fey 4'	Report	Morgan 2'; Pearce 54'

Stadium:
National Hockey Centre

14 July 2011
14:00

NT (Northern Territory)	0–1	(Victoria (state)) VIC
	Report	Tuhan 47'

Stadium:
National Hockey Centre

14 July 2011
16:00

SA (South Australia)	0–2	(Western Australia) WA
	Report	Smith 24'; Turner 62'

Stadium:
National Hockey Centre

16 July 2011
10:00

NSW (New South Wales)	1–0	(Victoria (state)) VIC
Smith 27'	Report

Stadium:
National Hockey Centre

16 July 2011
12:00

ACT (Australian Capital Territory)	2–4	(Western Australia) WA
Lee 15'; Kindon 50'	Report	Turner 37'; Slattery 39', 53'; Squibb 68'

Stadium:
National Hockey Centre

16 July 2011
14:00

TAS (Tasmania)	0–2	(South Australia) SA
	Report	Buchecker 6'; Claxton 11'

Stadium:
National Hockey Centre

16 July 2011
16:00

NT (Northern Territory)	0–4	(Queensland) QLD
	Report	Kerr 1'; Fey 23'; Kershaw 33'; Olivieri 66'

Stadium:
National Hockey Centre

17 July 2011
10:00

VIC (Victoria (state))	6–1	(Tasmania) TAS
Tuhan 4', 28', 30'; Breen 20'; Cousins 57'; Padget 68'	Report	Hunter 64'

Stadium:
National Hockey Centre

17 July 2011
12:00

WA (Western Australia)	1–2	(Queensland) QLD
Slattery 42'	Report	Olivieri 18'; Kerr 52'

Stadium:
National Hockey Centre

17 July 2011
14:00

NT (Northern Territory)	4–0	(Australian Capital Territory) ACT
Bottcher 10'; Peris 40'; Strawbridge 52'; O'Connor 59'	Report

Stadium:
National Hockey Centre

17 July 2011
16:00

SA (South Australia)	0–1	(New South Wales) NSW
	Report	Simpson 26'

Stadium:
National Hockey Centre

19 July 2011
10:00

QLD (Queensland)	1–0	(South Australia) SA
Fey 12'	Report

Stadium:
National Hockey Centre

19 July 2011
12:00

TAS (Tasmania)	3–3	(Northern Territory) NT
Hopkins 24', 54'; Calvert 57'	Report	Peris 1', 59'; Richardson 68'

Stadium:
National Hockey Centre

19 July 2011
14:00

WA (Western Australia)	2–1	(New South Wales) NSW
Mazzini 10'; Slattery 16'	Report	Watts 7'

Stadium:
National Hockey Centre

19 July 2011
16:00

ACT (Australian Capital Territory)	2–2	(Victoria (state)) VIC
Bailey-Price 52'; McDonald 70'	Report	Tuhan 13'; Forsyth 34'

Stadium:
National Hockey Centre

20 July 2011
10:00

NSW (New South Wales)	5–0	(Northern Territory) NT
Smith 1', 42'; Clifton 56'; Simpson 62'; Carmichael 66'	Report

Stadium:
National Hockey Centre

20 July 2011
12:00

ACT (Australian Capital Territory)	3–2	(South Australia) SA
Evans 45'; Lee 59'; Kindon 68'	Report	Watters 19'; McMahon 69'

Stadium:
National Hockey Centre

20 July 2011
14:00

VIC (Victoria (state))	2–6	(Queensland) QLD
Filliponi 46'; Boucher 63'	Report	Pavish 15'; Kershaw 18'; Olivieri 39'; Kerr 61'; Lammon 66'; Stone 70'

Stadium:
National Hockey Centre

20 July 2011
16:00

WA (Western Australia)	2–1	(Tasmania) TAS
Pascov 34'; Morgan 68'	Report	Hunter 53'

Stadium:
National Hockey Centre

=== Classification round ===
==== Fifth to eighth place classification ====
Crossover
22 July 2011
(South Australia) SA	2
(Tasmania) TAS	4
22 July 2011
(Australian Capital Territory) ACT	2
(Northern Territory) NT	1

Fifth Place
23 July 2011
(Tasmania) TAS	1
(Australian Capital Territory) ACT	1
Seventh Place
23 July 2011
(South Australia) SA	4
(Northern Territory) NT	0

===== Crossover =====
22 July 2011
10:00

SA (South Australia)	2–4	(Tasmania) TAS
Reynolds 16', 42'	Report	Hunter 2', 70'; Patten 28', 39'

Stadium:
National Hockey Centre

22 July 2011
12:00

ACT (Australian Capital Territory)	2–1	(Northern Territory) NT
Kindon 35'; Evans 68'	Report	Peris 70'

Stadium:
National Hockey Centre

===== Seventh and eighth place =====
23 July 2011
10:00

SA (South Australia)	4–0	(Northern Territory) NT
Reynolds 19', 57'; Penington 22'; Watters 53'	Report

Stadium:
National Hockey Centre

===== Fifth and sixth place =====
23 July 2011
12:00

TAS (Tasmania)	1–1	(Australian Capital Territory) ACT
Risk 6'	Report	Davis 56'

Stadium:
National Hockey Centre

==== First to fourth place classification ====
Semi-Finals
22 July 2011
(New South Wales) NSW	2
(Victoria (state)) VIC	1
22 July 2011
(Queensland) QLD	0
(Western Australia) WA	3

Final
23 July 2011
(New South Wales) NSW	0
(Western Australia) WA (a.e.t)	1
Third Place
23 July 2011
(Victoria (state)) VIC	0
(Queensland) QLD	1

===== Semi-finals =====
22 July 2011
14:00

NSW (New South Wales)	2–1	(Victoria (state)) VIC
Morgan 34'; Simpson 60'	Report	Purser 37'

Stadium:
National Hockey Centre

22 July 2011
16:00

QLD (Queensland)	0–3	(Western Australia) WA
	Report	Slattery 4', 57'; Squibb 58'

Stadium:
National Hockey Centre

===== Third and fourth place =====
23 July 2011
14:00

VIC (Victoria (state))	0–1	(Queensland) QLD
	Report	Olivieri 22'

Stadium:
National Hockey Centre

===== Final =====
23 July 2011
16:00

NSW (New South Wales)	0–1 (a.e.t.)	(Western Australia) WA
	Report	Slattery 84'

Stadium:
National Hockey Centre

== Awards ==
Player of the Tournament	Top Goalscorer	Fair Play Award
(Queensland) Alyssa Kerr	(Western Australia) Kathryn Slattery	(New South Wales) NSW

== Statistics ==
=== Final standings ===
As per statistical convention in field hockey, matches decided in extra time are counted as wins and losses, while matches decided by penalty shoot-outs are counted as draws.

Pos	Team	Pld	W	D	L	GF	GA	GD	Pts	Final Standings
1st place, gold medalist(s)	(Western Australia) WA	9	7	0	2	21	11	+10	21	Gold Medal
2nd place, silver medalist(s)	(New South Wales) NSW	9	7	0	2	20	5	+15	21	Silver Medal
3rd place, bronze medalist(s)	(Queensland) QLD	9	7	0	2	22	10	+12	21	Bronze Medal
4	(Victoria (state)) VIC	9	4	1	4	17	15	+2	13	
5	(Australian Capital Territory) ACT	9	2	3	4	13	23	−10	9	
6	(Tasmania) TAS	9	1	3	5	13	26	−13	6	
7	(South Australia) SA	9	3	0	6	14	13	+1	9	
8	(Northern Territory) NT	9	1	1	7	10	27	−17	4	

Source: Hockey Australia

=== Goalscorers ===
There were 130 goals scored in 36 matches, for an average of 3.61 goals per match.

9 goals

- (Western Australia) Kathryn Slattery

8 goals

- (Queensland) Kandice Olivieri

6 goals

- (Northern Territory) Brooke Peris
- (Victoria (state)) Michelle Tuhan

5 goals

- (New South Wales) Cara Simpson
- (Queensland) Ashlea Fey

4 goals

- (South Australia) Tess Reynolds
- (Tasmania) Keely Hunter

3 goals

- (Australian Capital Territory) Stephanie Kindon
- (Australian Capital Territory) Rebecca Lee
- (New South Wales) Kirsten Pearce
- (New South Wales) Emily Smith
- (New South Wales) Mardi Watts
- (Queensland) Alyssa Kerr
- (Queensland) Stephanie Kershaw
- (South Australia) Jane Claxton
- (South Australia) Amy Watters
- (Tasmania) Bridie Hopkins
- (Victoria (state)) Sarah Breen
- (Western Australia) Caitlin Pascov

2 goals

- (Australian Capital Territory) Naomi Evans
- (New South Wales) Georgina Morgan
- (Tasmania) Blair Patten
- (Tasmania) Tegan Risk
- (Victoria (state)) Tegan Boucher
- (Western Australia) Penny Squibb
- (Western Australia) Sophie Turner

1 goal

- (Australian Capital Territory) Catriona Bailey-Price
- (Australian Capital Territory) Jordan Beard
- (Australian Capital Territory) Jenna Cartwright
- (Australian Capital Territory) Kelsey Davis
- (Australian Capital Territory) Juanita McDonald
- (New South Wales) Mathilda Carmichael
- (New South Wales) Emma Clifton
- (New South Wales) Jamaya Fergusson
- (New South Wales) Alyssa Healy
- (Northern Territory) Elise Bottcher
- (Northern Territory) Aleesha O'Connor
- (Northern Territory) Elle Richardson
- (Northern Territory) Jessica Strawbridge
- (Queensland) Kazzia Lammon
- (Queensland) Samantha Pavish
- (Queensland) Jamie Stone
- (South Australia) Brooklyn Buchecker
- (South Australia) Catherine Connolly
- (South Australia) Karri McMahon
- (South Australia) Alison Penington
- (Tasmania) Hannah Calvert
- (Tasmania) Monique Grundy
- (Victoria (state)) Shara Cousins
- (Victoria (state)) Darcie Filliponi
- (Victoria (state)) Sarah Forsyth
- (Victoria (state)) Hayley Padget
- (Victoria (state)) Meg Pearce
- (Victoria (state)) Tegan Purser
- (Western Australia) Danica Mazzini
- (Western Australia) Kate Morgan
- (Western Australia) Kate Mead
- (Western Australia) Katelyn Smith
- (Western Australia) Katy Symons
