= 2016 Women's Australian Hockey League =

Tournament details
- Host country: Australia
- City: Perth
- Teams: 10
- Venue: Perth Hockey Stadium

Final positions
- Champions: (Queensland) QLD Scorchers (6th title)
- Runner-up: (Victoria (state)) VIC Vipers
- Third place: (New South Wales) NSW Arrows

Tournament statistics
- Matches played: 35
- Goals scored: 134 (3.83 per match)
- Top scorer: (Victoria (state)) Emily Hurtz (5 goals)
- Best player: (Victoria (state)) Georgia Nanscawen

The 2016 Women's Australian Hockey League was the 24th edition of the women's field hockey tournament. The tournament was held in the Western Australia city of Perth.

Queensland Scorchers won the gold medal for the sixth time by defeating the Victorian Vipers 3–2 in the final. NSW Arrows won the bronze medal by defeating Canberra Strikers 2–1 in the third place playoff.

== Competition format ==
The tournament is divided into two pools, Pool A and Pool B, each consisting of five teams in a round robin format. Throughout the pool stage however, teams from each pool competed in crossover matches with the teams in the other pool, with each team playing one crossover match.

At the conclusion of the pool stage, the top two teams of Pools A and B progressed through to the semi-finals, where the top placed teams of each pool competed against the second placed team of each pool, with the winners progressing to the final.

The bottom three teams in each pool move into Pool C (Classification Round), where teams carry over points from previous matches, and play the remaining teams. The final placings in Pool C carry over to final placings in the tournament.

== Teams ==
Domestic Teams

- (Australian Capital Territory) Canberra Strikers
- New South Wales Arrows
- (Northern Territory) NT Pearls
- Queensland Scorchers
- (South Australia) SA Suns
- (Tasmania) Tassie Van Demons
- (Victoria (state)) Victorian Vipers
- (Western Australia) WA Diamonds

International Teams

- Malaysia Tigress
- New Zealand Futures

== Results ==
=== First round ===
- Note: All dates and times of crossover matches have been bolded and points have been added to teams' respective pools.

==== Pool A ====
| Pos | Team | Pld | W | D | L | GF | GA | GD | Pts | Qualification |
|---|---|---|---|---|---|---|---|---|---|---|
| 1 | (Queensland) QLD Scorchers | 5 | 4 | 0 | 1 | 12 | 3 | +9 | **12** | Semi-finals |
| 2 | (Australian Capital Territory) Canberra Strikers | 5 | 3 | 0 | 2 | 12 | 7 | +5 | **9** | Semi-finals |
| 3 | (Western Australia) WA Diamonds (H) | 5 | 3 | 0 | 2 | 11 | 9 | +2 | **9** | |
| 4 | NZL Futures | 5 | 2 | 1 | 2 | 6 | 10 | −4 | **7** | |
| 5 | (Tasmania) Tassie Van Demons | 5 | 0 | 1 | 4 | 3 | 12 | −9 | **1** | |

Source: Hockey Australia
(H) Hosts

**29 September 2016**
**10:30**

| NZL Futures (New Zealand) | 3–1 | Malaysia Tigress |
|---|---|---|
| Ackroyd 12'; Tinning 21'; Robinson 44' | Report | Zaki 23' |

Perth Hockey Stadium
Umpires:
Kylie Seymour
Courtney Pearson

29 September 2016
12:00

| Tassie Van Demons (Tasmania) | 0–2 | (Queensland) QLD Scorchers |
|---|---|---|
| | Report | Taylor 19'; Kenny 21' |

Perth Hockey Stadium
Umpires:
Shannon Scott
Michelle Pecar

29 September 2016
14:00

| WA Diamonds (Western Australia) | 4–1 | (Australian Capital Territory) Canberra Strikers |
|---|---|---|
| Gibbs 11'; Squibb 20', 56'; Flynn 41' | Report | Commerford 32' |

Perth Hockey Stadium
Umpires:
Aleisha Neumann
Janelle Bond

30 September 2016
12:30

| Canberra Strikers (Australian Capital Territory) | 3–1 | (New Zealand) NZL Futures |
|---|---|---|
| Gray 34', 38'; Evans 45' | Report | Wium 55' |

Perth Hockey Stadium
Umpires:
Ayu Zainuddin
Shannon Scott

30 September 2016
14:30

| QLD Scorchers (Queensland) | 0–2 | (Western Australia) WA Diamonds |
|---|---|---|
| | Report | Slattery 30'; Luff 36' |

Perth Hockey Stadium
Umpires:
Kerryl Chandler
Karen Bennett

1 October 2016
15:00

| Canberra Strikers (Australian Capital Territory) | 4–0 | (Tasmania) Tassie Van Demons |
|---|---|---|
| Evans 2'; M. Bone 18'; Flanagan 27'; Gray 44' | Report |

Perth Hockey Stadium
Umpires:
Kerryl Chandler
Michelle Pecar

1 October 2016
17:00

| NZL Futures (New Zealand) | 1–0 | (Western Australia) WA Diamonds |
|---|---|---|
| Tinning 12' | Report |

Perth Hockey Stadium
Umpires:
Aleisha Neumann
Kylie Seymour

**1 October 2016**
**19:00**

| QLD Scorchers (Queensland) | 3–0 | (Northern Territory) NT Pearls |
|---|---|---|
| Wilkinson 26'; Holzberger 45'; Dwyer 48' | Report |

Perth Hockey Stadium
Umpires:
Ayu Zainuddin
Karen Bennett

**3 October 2016**
**15:30**

| VIC Vipers (Victoria (state)) | 2–0 | (Tasmania) Tassie Van Demons |
|---|---|---|
| Ratcliffe 9'; Brazel 44' | Report |

Perth Hockey Stadium
Umpires:
Rhiannon Murrie
Kristy Robertson

4 October 2016
15:30

| WA Diamonds (Western Australia) | 3–2 | (Tasmania) Tassie Van Demons |
|---|---|---|
| Pascov 7'; Gibbs 24'; Luff 60' | Report | McCallister 15'; Spence 34' |

Perth Hockey Stadium
Umpires:
Shannon Scott
Bernadette Pangrazio

4 October 2016
17:30

| NZL Futures (New Zealand) | 0–5 | (Queensland) QLD Scorchers |
|---|---|---|
| | Report | Malone 14'; M. Fitzpatrick 20', 58'; Kenny 54'; Wilkinson 56' |

Perth Hockey Stadium
Umpires:
Kerryl Chandler
Kristy Robertson

**4 October 2016**
**19:30**

| Canberra Strikers (Australian Capital Territory) | 3–0 | (South Australia) SA Suns |
|---|---|---|
| Evans 7'; Gray 49'; Cartwright 51' | Report |

Perth Hockey Stadium
Umpires:
Kylie Seymour
Karen Bennett

**5 October 2016**
**10:30**

| NSW Arrows (New South Wales) | 5–2 | (Western Australia) WA Diamonds |
|---|---|---|
| Simpson 5'; Farrell 8', 18'; Stewart 27'; Hayes 45' | Report | Gibbs 26'; Broek 35' |

Perth Hockey Stadium
Umpires:
Karen Bennett
Courtney Pearson

5 October 2016
12:30

| Tassie Van Demons (Tasmania) | 1–1 | (New Zealand) NZL Futures |
|---|---|---|
| Geeves 29' | Report | Ritchie 15' |

Perth Hockey Stadium
Umpires:
Ayu Zainuddin
Kerryl Chandler

5 October 2016
14:30

| QLD Scorchers (Queensland) | 2–1 | (Australian Capital Territory) Canberra Strikers |
|---|---|---|
| Holzberger 31'; Malone 47' | Report | Evans 37' |

Perth Hockey Stadium
Umpires:
Kylie Seymour
Rhiannon Murrie

==== Pool B ====
| Pos | Team | Pld | W | D | L | GF | GA | GD | Pts | Qualification |
|---|---|---|---|---|---|---|---|---|---|---|
| 1 | (Victoria (state)) VIC Vipers | 5 | 4 | 0 | 1 | 15 | 6 | +9 | **12** | Semi-finals |
| 2 | (New South Wales) NSW Arrows | 5 | 3 | 1 | 1 | 17 | 9 | +8 | **10** | Semi-finals |
| 3 | Malaysia Tigress | 5 | 2 | 1 | 2 | 17 | 15 | +2 | **7** | |
| 4 | (South Australia) SA Suns | 5 | 2 | 0 | 3 | 8 | 13 | −5 | **6** | |
| 5 | (Northern Territory) NT Pearls | 5 | 0 | 0 | 5 | 2 | 19 | −17 | **0** | |

Source: Hockey Australia

**29 September 2016**
**10:30**

| NZL Futures (New Zealand) | 3–1 | Malaysia Tigress |
|---|---|---|
| Ackroyd 12'; Tinning 21'; Robinson 44' | Report | Zaki 23' |

Perth Hockey Stadium
Umpires:
Kylie Seymour
Courtney Pearson

29 September 2016
12:30

| SA Suns (South Australia) | 1–4 | (New South Wales) NSW Arrows |
|---|---|---|
| Grist 56' | Report | Morgan 16', 37'; Hanna 18'; Williams 53' |

Perth Hockey Stadium
Umpires:
Karen Bennett
Kristy Robertson

29 September 2016
14:30

| NT Pearls (Northern Territory) | 0–3 | (Victoria (state)) VIC Vipers |
|---|---|---|
| | Report | Gravenall 10'; Schubach 38', 50' |

Perth Hockey Stadium
Umpires:
Bernadette Pangrazio
Kerryl Chandler

30 September 2016
12:30

| NT Pearls (Northern Territory) | 1–7 | Malaysia Tigress |
|---|---|---|
| Fitzsimmons 18' | Report | Siti O. 9', 52'; Nurul 10', 56'; Hanis 20'; Sayuti 41'; Raja 58' |

Perth Hockey Stadium
Umpires:
Michelle Pecar
Kristy Robertson

30 September 2016
14:00

| VIC Vipers (Victoria (state)) | 3–1 | (New South Wales) NSW Arrows |
|---|---|---|
| Nanscawen 2'; Hurtz 18', 55' | Report | Simpson 19' |

Umpires:
Courtney Pearson
Bernadette Pangrazio

1 October 2016
15:30

| VIC Vipers (Victoria (state)) | 1–3 | (South Australia) SA Suns |
|---|---|---|
| Barden 12' | Report | Apps 5'; Watters 14'; Bright 60' |

Umpires:
Janelle Bond
Shannon Scott

1 October 2016
17:30

| NSW Arrows (New South Wales) | 3–3 | Malaysia Tigress |
|---|---|---|
| Williams 19', 45'; Wilson 34' | Report | Fazilla 21'; Siti R. 23'; Hanis 30' |

Umpires:
Rhiannon Murrie
Bernadette Pangrazio

**1 October 2016**
**19:00**

| QLD Scorchers (Queensland) | 3–0 | (Northern Territory) NT Pearls |
|---|---|---|
| Wilkinson 26'; Holzberger 45'; Dwyer 48' | Report |

Perth Hockey Stadium
Umpires:
Ayu Zainuddin
Karen Bennett

**3 October 2016**
**15:30**

| VIC Vipers (Victoria (state)) | 2–0 | (Tasmania) Tassie Van Demons |
|---|---|---|
| Ratcliffe 9'; Brazel 44' | Report |

Perth Hockey Stadium
Umpires:
Rhiannon Murrie
Kristy Robertson

3 October 2016
17:30

| Malaysia Tigress | 4–2 | (South Australia) SA Suns |
|---|---|---|
| Siti R. 4', 30'; Fazilla 33'; Awang 37' | Report | Holland-Smith 7'; Claxton 27' |

Umpires:
Aleisha Neumann
Courtney Pearson

3 October 2016
19:00

| NSW Arrows (New South Wales) | 4–0 | (Northern Territory) NT Pearls |
|---|---|---|
| Patterson 6'; Williams 7'; Stewart 27'; Simpson 41' | Report |

Umpires:
Ayu Zainuddin
Janelle Bond

**4 October 2016**
**19:30**

| Canberra Strikers (Australian Capital Territory) | 3–0 | (South Australia) SA Suns |
|---|---|---|
| Evans 7'; Gray 49'; Cartwright 51' | Report |

Perth Hockey Stadium
Umpires:
Kylie Seymour
Karen Bennett

**5 October 2016**
**10:30**

| NSW Arrows (New South Wales) | 5–2 | (Western Australia) WA Diamonds |
|---|---|---|
| Simpson 5'; Farrell 8', 18'; Stewart 27'; Hayes 45' | Report | Gibbs 26'; Broek 35' |

Perth Hockey Stadium
Umpires:
Karen Bennett
Courtney Pearson

5 October 2016
12:00

| Malaysia Tigress | 2–6 | (Victoria (state)) VIC Vipers |
|---|---|---|
| Hanis 14', 58' | Report | Hurtz 10', 19'; Nanscawen 20'; Gravenall 21', 31'; Padget 52' |

Perth Hockey Stadium
Umpires:
Michelle Pecar
Janelle Bond

5 October 2016
14:00

| SA Suns (South Australia) | 2–1 | (Northern Territory) NT Pearls |
|---|---|---|
| Spano 30', 47' | Report | Emblem 51' |

Perth Hockey Stadium
Umpires:
Kristy Robertson
Bernadette Pangrazio

=== Second round ===
==== Pool C (Classification round) ====
| Pos | Team | Pld | W | D | L | GF | GA | GD | Pts |
|---|---|---|---|---|---|---|---|---|---|
| 1 | (Western Australia) WA Diamonds | 4 | 3 | 0 | 1 | 8 | 5 | +3 | 9 |
| 2 | NZL Futures | 4 | 2 | 2 | 0 | 5 | 2 | +3 | 8 |
| 3 | Malaysia Tigress | 4 | 2 | 1 | 1 | 13 | 7 | +6 | 7 |
| 4 | (Tasmania) Tassie Van Demons | 4 | 1 | 1 | 2 | 6 | 6 | 0 | 4 |
| 5 | (South Australia) SA Suns | 4 | 1 | 0 | 3 | 5 | 9 | −4 | 3 |
| 6 | (Northern Territory) NT Pearls | 4 | 1 | 0 | 3 | 4 | 12 | −8 | 3 |

Source: Hockey Australia

7 October 2016
08:00

| Tassie Van Demons (Tasmania) | 1–2 | (Northern Territory) NT Pearls |
|---|---|---|
| Murphy 21' | Report | Fitzsimmons 37', 60' |

Umpires:
Courtney Pearson
Ayu Zainuddin

7 October 2016
10:00

| Malaysia Tigress | 1–1 | (New Zealand) NZL Futures |
|---|---|---|
| Mansur 42' | Report | Wium 13' |

Umpires:
Michelle Pecar
Shannon Scott

7 October 2016
12:00

| WA Diamonds (Western Australia) | 2–1 | (South Australia) SA Suns |
|---|---|---|
| Slattery 32', 49' | Report | Spano 46' |

Umpires:
Bernadette Pangrazio
Kerryl Chandler

8 October 2016
10:00

| SA Suns (South Australia) | 0–2 | (Tasmania) Tassie Van Demons |
|---|---|---|
| | Report | Brennan 27'; Blackwell 54' |

Umpires:
Michelle Pecar
Kristy Robertson

8 October 2016
14:00

| NZL Futures (New Zealand) | 2–0 | (Northern Territory) NT Pearls |
|---|---|---|
| Robinson 37'; Ritchie 40' | Report |

Umpires:
Courtney Pearson
Ayu Zainuddin

8 October 2016
18:00

| WA Diamonds (Western Australia) | 3–1 | Malaysia Tigress |
|---|---|---|
| Buckley 3'; Peacock 35'; Broek 45' | Report | Ruhani 53' |

Umpires:
Rhiannon Murrie
Shannon Scott

==== First to fourth place classification ====
Semi-finals
7 October 2016
**(Victoria (state)) VIC Vipers** | **4**
(Australian Capital Territory) Canberra Strikers | 1
7 October 2016
**(Queensland) QLD Scorchers** | **2**
(New South Wales) NSW Arrows | 0

Final
9 October 2016
(Victoria (state)) VIC Vipers | 2
**(Queensland) QLD Scorchers** | **3**
Third Place
9 October 2016
(Australian Capital Territory) Canberra Strikers | 1
**(New South Wales) NSW Arrows** | **2**

===== Semi-finals =====
7 October 2016
14:00

| VIC Vipers (Victoria (state)) | 4–1 | (Australian Capital Territory) Canberra Strikers |
|---|---|---|
| Ratcliffe 1'; Hurtz 31'; Nanscawen 43'; Taylor 56' | Report | Curtis 21' |

Umpires:
Karen Bennett (NZL)
Rhiannon Murrie (AUS)

7 October 2016
16:00

| QLD Scorchers (Queensland) | 2–0 | (New South Wales) NSW Arrows |
|---|---|---|
| Greiner 27'; Kenny 41' | Report |

Umpires:
Kylie Seymour (AUS)
Janelle Bond (AUS)

===== Third and fourth place =====
9 October 2016
12:00

| Canberra Strikers (Australian Capital Territory) | 1–2 | (New South Wales) NSW Arrows |
|---|---|---|
| Curtis 26' | Report | Hanna 37'; Allendorf 41' |

Umpires:
Rhiannon Murrie (AUS)
Janelle Bond (AUS)

===== Final =====
9 October 2016
14:00

| VIC Vipers (Victoria (state)) | 2–3 | (Queensland) QLD Scorchers |
|---|---|---|
| Gravenall 7'; Taylor 60' | Report | S. Fitzpatrick 36'; Greiner 39'; Kenny 60' |

Umpires:
Kylie Seymour (AUS)
Karen Bennett (NZL)

== Awards ==
| Player of the Tournament | Top Goalscorer | Player of the Final | Goalkeeper of the Tournament | Play the Whistle |
|---|---|---|---|---|
| (Victoria (state)) Georgia Nanscawen | (Victoria (state)) Emily Hurtz | (Queensland) Jordyn Holzberger | (Queensland) Clare Comerford | NZL Futures |

== Statistics ==
=== Final standings ===
| Pos | Team | Pld | W | D | L | GF | GA | GD | Pts | Final Result |
|---|---|---|---|---|---|---|---|---|---|---|
| 1st place, gold medalist(s) | (Queensland) QLD Scorchers | 7 | 6 | 0 | 1 | 17 | 5 | +12 | 18 | Gold Medal |
| 2nd place, silver medalist(s) | (Victoria (state)) VIC Vipers | 7 | 5 | 0 | 2 | 21 | 10 | +11 | 15 | Silver Medal |
| 3rd place, bronze medalist(s) | (New South Wales) NSW Arrows | 7 | 4 | 1 | 2 | 19 | 12 | +7 | 13 | Bronze Medal |
| 4 | (Australian Capital Territory) Canberra Strikers | 7 | 3 | 0 | 4 | 14 | 13 | +1 | 9 | Fourth Place |
| 5 | (Western Australia) WA Diamonds | 7 | 5 | 0 | 2 | 16 | 11 | +5 | 15 | Fifth Place |
| 6 | (New Zealand) NZL Futures | 7 | 3 | 2 | 2 | 9 | 11 | −2 | 11 | Sixth Place |
| 7 | Malaysia Tigress | 7 | 2 | 2 | 3 | 19 | 19 | 0 | 8 | Seventh Place |
| 8 | (Tasmania) Tassie Van Demons | 7 | 1 | 1 | 5 | 6 | 14 | −8 | 4 | Eighth Place |
| 9 | (South Australia) SA Suns | 7 | 2 | 0 | 5 | 9 | 17 | −8 | 6 | Ninth Place |
| 10 | (Northern Territory) NT Pearls | 7 | 1 | 0 | 6 | 4 | 22 | −18 | 3 | Tenth Place |

Source: Hockey Australia

== Goalscorers ==
There were 134 goals scored in 35 matches, for an average of 3.83 goals per match.

5 goals

- (Victoria (state)) Emily Hurtz

4 goals

- (Australian Capital Territory) Naomi Evans
- (Australian Capital Territory) Laura Gray
- (Malaysia) Hanis Onn
- (Malaysia) Siti Ruhani
- (New South Wales) Mariah Williams
- (Queensland) Jodie Kenny
- (Victoria (state)) Hannah Gravenall

3 goals

- (Malaysia) Nurul Mansur
- (New South Wales) Molly Simpson
- (Northern Territory) Natasha FitzSimons
- (South Australia) Michaela Spano
- (Victoria (state)) Georgia Nanscawen
- (Western Australia) Annie Gibbs
- (Western Australia) Kathryn Slattery

2 goals

- (Australian Capital Territory) Michaela Curtis
- (Malaysia) Siti Othman
- (Malaysia) Fazilla Sylvester
- (New South Wales) Lisa Farrell
- (New South Wales) Kate Hanna
- (New South Wales) Georgina Morgan
- (New South Wales) Grace Stewart
- (New Zealand) Deanna Ritchie
- (New Zealand) Amy Robinson
- (New Zealand) Catherine Tinning
- (New Zealand) Emily Wium
- (Queensland) Madison Fitzpatrick
- (Queensland) Rebecca Greiner
- (Queensland) Jordyn Holzberger
- (Queensland) Ambrosia Malone
- (Queensland) Britt Wilkinson
- (Victoria (state)) Madeleine Ratcliffe
- (Victoria (state)) Danielle Schubach
- (Victoria (state)) Sophie Taylor
- (Western Australia) Roos Broek
- (Western Australia) Melissa Luff
- (Western Australia) Penny Squibb

1 goal

- (Australian Capital Territory) Meredith Bone
- (Australian Capital Territory) Jenna Cartwright
- (Australian Capital Territory) Kalindi Commerford
- (Australian Capital Territory) Anna Flanagan
- (Malaysia) Sayuti Faiezah
- (Malaysia) Zaki Naimah
- (Malaysia) Norsharina Shabuddin
- (Malaysia) Awang Surizan
- (New South Wales) Murphy Allendorf
- (New South Wales) Greta Hayes
- (New South Wales) Mikaela Patterson
- (New South Wales) Abigail Wilson
- (New Zealand) Josie Ackroyd
- (Northern Territory) Jade Emblem
- (Queensland) Kirstin Dwyer
- (Queensland) Savannah Fitzpatrick
- (Queensland) Renee Taylor
- (South Australia) Isabella Apps
- (South Australia) Tarryn Bright
- (South Australia) Jane Claxton
- (South Australia) Emily Grist
- (South Australia) Lucy Holland-Smith
- (South Australia) Amy Watters
- (Tasmania) Stephanie Blackwell
- (Tasmania) Eleanor Brennan
- (Tasmania) Nicole Geeves
- (Tasmania) Ainsley McCallister
- (Tasmania) Madeleine Murphy
- (Tasmania) Amelia Spence
- (Victoria (state)) Laura Barden
- (Victoria (state)) Lily Brazel
- (Victoria (state)) Hayley Padget
- (Western Australia) Jemma Buckley
- (Western Australia) Kyra Flynn
- (Western Australia) Caitlin Pascov
- (Western Australia) Candyce Peacock

Source: Hockey Australia
