= 2012 Women's International Super Series Hockey 9's =

Tournament details
- Host country: Australia
- City: Perth, Western Australia
- Dates: 22–25 November 2012
- Teams: 3 (from 2 confederations)
- Venue: Perth Hockey Stadium

Final positions
- Champions: Australia (2nd title)
- Runner-up: Australia U–21
- Third place: Malaysia

Tournament statistics
- Matches played: 7
- Goals scored: 33 (4.71 per match)
- Top scorer: (Australia) Fiona Boyce (5 goals)

The 2012 Women's International Super Series Hockey 9's was the second edition of the women's field hockey tournament. The tournament was held at the Perth Hockey Stadium between 22–25 November 2012 in Perth, Western Australia. A total of three teams competed for the title.

The tournament was held alongside the men's competition.

Australia won the tournament for the second time, defeating Australia U–21 2–0 in the final.

== Participating nations ==
A total of four teams competed for the title:

- Australia
- Australia U–21
- Malaysia

== Officials ==
The following umpires were appointed by the FIH and Hockey Australia to officiate the tournament:

- Sarah Allanson (AUS)
- Nor Piza Hassan (MAS)
- Kim Kuk-Hee (AUS)

== Competition format and rules ==
The International Super Series Hockey 9's has a unique set of rules varying from standard FIH regulations.

The main variations are as follows:

- Matches are played with a maximum of 9 players on the field at any time for each team
- Matches are played in 2 halves of 20 minutes
- Goals are widened by 1 metre than regulation size

== Results ==
=== Preliminary round ===
Pos	Team	Pld	W	D	L	GF	GA	GD	Pts	Qualification
1	Australia	4	3	1	0	20	2	+18	10	Advanced to Final
2	Australia U–21	4	2	1	1	8	10	−2	7	Advanced to Final
3	Malaysia	4	0	0	4	3	19	−16	0	

Source: Hockey Australia
Rules for classification: 1) points; 2) goal difference; 3) goals scored; 4) head-to-head result.

==== Fixtures ====
22 November 2012
17:30

Australia U–21	3–2	Malaysia
Williams 6'; Flanagan 17'; Smith 35'	Report	Kannagi 22'; Norbaini 26'

Umpires:
Nor Piza Hassan (MAS)
Kik Kuk-Hee (AUS)

22 November 2012
18:25

Australia	7–0	Australia U–21
Dwyer 2'; Parker 8'; Boyce 11'; Olivieri 12'; Attard 19'; Chau 30'; Messent 33'	Report

Umpires:
Kik Kuk-Hee (AUS)
Sarah Allanson (AUS)

23 November 2012
17:30

Malaysia	0–4	Australia U–21
	Report	Williams 12', 37'; Evans 25'; Holzberger 31'

Umpires:
Sarah Allanson (AUS)
Nor Piza Hassan (MAS)

23 November 2012
18:25

Australia	7–0	Malaysia
Olivieri 5', 6'; Boyce 9', 38'; Reuter 21', 28'; Schulz 34'	Report

Umpires:
Nor Piza Hassan (MAS)
Kik Kuk-Hee (AUS)

24 November 2012
12:15

Australia U–21	1–1	Australia
Pearce 35'	Report	Dwyer 11'

Umpires:
Sarah Allanson (AUS)
Kik Kuk-Hee (AUS)

24 November 2012
13:10

Malaysia	1–5	Australia
Norazlin 14'	Report	Boyce 1', 17'; 3', 40'; Reuter 23'

Umpires:
Sarah Allanson (AUS)
Nor Piza Hassan (MAS)

=== Classification match ===
==== Final ====
25 November 2012
12:50

Australia	2–0	Australia U–21
Attard 12'; Dwyer 29'	Report

Umpires:
Kik Kuk-Hee (AUS)
Sarah Allanson (AUS)

== Statistics ==
=== Final standings ===
1. Australia
2. Australia U–21
3. Malaysia

=== Goalscorers ===
There were 33 goals scored in 7 matches, for an average of 4.71 goals per match.

5 goals

- (Australia) Fiona Boyce

3 goals

- (Australia) Jill Dwyer
- (Australia) Kandice Olivieri
- (Australia) Rebecca Reuter
- (Australia) Mariah Williams

2 goals

- (Australia) Teneal Attard

1 goal

- (Australia) Kary Chau
- (Australia) Naomi Evans
- (Australia) Anna Flanagan
- (Australia) Jordyn Holzberger
- (Australia) Claire Messent
- (Australia) Georgina Parker
- (Australia) Meg Pearce
- (Australia) Jodie Schulz
- (Australia) Emily Smith
- (Malaysia) Kannagi Arumugam
- (Malaysia) Norbaini Hashim
- (Malaysia) Norazlin Sumantri

2 own goals

- Malaysia (against Australia)
