= 2012 Women's Australian Hockey League =

Tournament details
- Host country: Australia
- City: Perth
- Teams: 8
- Venue: Perth Hockey Stadium

Final positions
- Champions: (Victoria (state)) VIC Vipers (2nd title)
- Runner-up: (New South Wales) NSW Arrows
- Third place: (Queensland) QLD Scorchers

Tournament statistics
- Matches played: 36
- Goals scored: 125 (3.47 per match)
- Top scorer(s): (Queensland) Renee Ashton (Victoria (state)) Claire Messent (6 goals)
- Best player: (Australian Capital Territory) Anna Flanagan

The 2012 Women's Australian Hockey League was the 20th edition of women's field hockey tournament. The tournament was held in the Western Australia city of Perth.

The VIC Vipers won the gold medal for the second time by defeating the NSW Arrows 5–1 in the final.

== Teams ==
- (Australian Capital Territory) Canberra Strikers
- (New South Wales) NSW Arrows
- (Northern Territory) NT Pearls
- (Queensland) QLD Scorchers
- (South Australia) SA Suns
- (Tasmania) Tassie Van Demons
- (Victoria (state)) VIC Vipers
- (Western Australia) WA Diamonds

== Results ==
=== First round ===
Pos	Team	Pld	W	D	L	GF	GA	GD	Pts	Qualification
1	(Queensland) QLD Scorchers	7	6	0	1	19	5	+14	18	Advance to Semi-Finals
2	(Western Australia) WA Diamonds	7	5	1	1	14	7	+7	16	Advance to Semi-Finals
3	(Victoria (state)) VIC Vipers	7	3	2	2	15	8	+7	11	Advance to Semi-Finals
4	(New South Wales) NSW Arrows	7	3	2	2	9	5	+4	11	Advance to Semi-Finals
5	(South Australia) SA Suns	7	3	1	3	11	8	+3	10	
6	(Australian Capital Territory) Canberra Strikers	7	3	0	4	18	15	+3	9	
7	(Northern Territory) NT Pearls	7	1	1	5	4	16	−12	4	
8	(Tasmania) Tassie Van Demons	7	0	1	6	1	27	−26	1	

Source: clearinghouseforsport

16 October 2012

VIC Vipers (Victoria (state))	1–3	(Queensland) QLD Scorchers
Nanscawen 66'	Report	Schulz 8'; 18'; Ashton 35'

Stadium:
Perth Hockey Stadium, Perth

16 October 2012

Tassie Van Demons (Tasmania)	1–3	(New South Wales) NSW Arrows
Moore 15'	Report	Morgan 13'; Webster 33'; McLeish 38'

Stadium:
Perth Hockey Stadium, Perth

16 October 2012

Canberra Strikers (Australian Capital Territory)	2–4	(South Australia) SA Suns
Stewart 13', 70'	Report	Parker 29'; Sobels 32'; Buchecker 64', 64'

Stadium:
Perth Hockey Stadium, Perth

16 October 2012

WA Diamonds (Western Australia)	3–0	(Northern Territory) NT Pearls
Slattery 37'; Nelson 39'; Buckley 46'	Report

Stadium:
Perth Hockey Stadium, Perth

17 October 2012

NSW Arrows (New South Wales)	0–2	(Australian Capital Territory) Canberra Strikers
	Report	Flanagan 2'; Taylor 13'

Stadium:
Perth Hockey Stadium, Perth

17 October 2012

VIC Vipers (Victoria (state))	1–1	(South Australia) SA Suns
Nanscawen 61'	Report	Pisani 30'

Stadium:
Perth Hockey Stadium, Perth

17 October 2012

NT Pearls (Northern Territory)	0–3	(Queensland) QLD Scorchers
	Report	Allendorf 12'; Ashton 19'; Reuter 26'

Stadium:
Perth Hockey Stadium, Perth

17 October 2012

WA Diamonds (Western Australia)	1–0	(Tasmania) Tassie Van Demons
Nelson 42'	Report

Stadium:
Perth Hockey Stadium, Perth

18 October 2012

SA Suns (South Australia)	1–2	(Northern Territory) NT Pearls
King 40'	Report	Noffke 50'; Peris 55'

Stadium:
Perth Hockey Stadium, Perth

18 October 2012

NSW Arrows (New South Wales)	0–0	(Victoria (state)) VIC Vipers
	Report

Stadium:
Perth Hockey Stadium, Perth

18 October 2012

WA Diamonds (Western Australia)	3–1	(Australian Capital Territory) Canberra Strikers
Symons 6', 19'; Searle 29'	Report	Evans 37'

Stadium:
Perth Hockey Stadium, Perth

18 October 2012

Tassie Van Demons (Tasmania)	0–5	(Queensland) QLD Scorchers
	Report	Olivieri 21', 56', 61'; Reuter 48'; Ashton 57'

Stadium:
Perth Hockey Stadium, Perth

20 October 2012

NT Pearls (Northern Territory)	0–0	(Tasmania) Tassie Van Demons
	Report

Stadium:
Perth Hockey Stadium, Perth

20 October 2012

Canberra Strikers (Australian Capital Territory)	0–2	(Victoria (state)) VIC Vipers
	Report	Schubach 20'; Riordan 64'

Stadium:
Perth Hockey Stadium, Perth

20 October 2012

WA Diamonds (Western Australia)	1–2	(Queensland) QLD Scorchers
Eglington 54'	Report	Ashton 10'; Marks 29'

Stadium:
Perth Hockey Stadium, Perth

20 October 2012

SA Suns (South Australia)	1–0	(New South Wales) NSW Arrows
Nance 24'	Report

Stadium:
Perth Hockey Stadium, Perth

21 October 2012

VIC Vipers (Victoria (state))	7–0	(Tasmania) Tassie Van Demons
Burns 20'; Ellis 39'; Peake 44'; Nanscawen 51', 54'; Trahar 60'; Messent 66'	Report

Stadium:
Perth Hockey Stadium, Perth

21 October 2012

Canberra Strikers (Australian Capital Territory)	3–1	(Northern Territory) NT Pearls
MacKinnon 60', 67'; E. Bone 70'	Report	Sutherland 47'

Stadium:
Perth Hockey Stadium, Perth

21 October 2012

SA Suns (South Australia)	1–2	(Western Australia) WA Diamonds
Eshuis 31'	Report	Wilson 13'; Pascov 41'

Stadium:
Perth Hockey Stadium, Perth

21 October 2012

QLD Scorchers (Queensland)	0–1	(New South Wales) NSW Arrows
	Report	Webster 62'

Stadium:
Perth Hockey Stadium, Perth

23 October 2012

NSW Arrows (New South Wales)	1–1	(Western Australia) WA Diamonds
Smith 52'	Report	Pascov 18'

Stadium:
Perth Hockey Stadium, Perth

23 October 2012

QLD Scorchers (Queensland)	1–0	(South Australia) SA Suns
Olivieri 70'	Report

Stadium:
Perth Hockey Stadium, Perth

23 October 2012

Tassie Van Demons (Tasmania)	0–8	(Australian Capital Territory) Canberra Strikers
	Report	Evans 6'; Flanagan 16', 61', 65'; Cartwright 23'; MacKinnon 50'; M. Bone 58'; McInerney 69'

Stadium:
Perth Hockey Stadium, Perth

23 October 2012

NT Pearls (Northern Territory)	1–2	(Victoria (state)) VIC Vipers
Larosa 4'	Report	Messent 37', 70'

Stadium:
Perth Hockey Stadium, Perth

24 October 2012

QLD Scorchers (Queensland)	5–2	(Australian Capital Territory) Canberra Strikers
Ashton 8', 37'; Johnson 13'; Olivieri 45'; Schulz 66'	Report	MacKinnon 43'; Glynn 59'

Stadium:
Perth Hockey Stadium, Perth

24 October 2012

SA Suns (South Australia)	3–0	(Tasmania) Tassie Van Demons
Buchecker 9', 47'; Sobels 49'	Report

Stadium:
Perth Hockey Stadium, Perth

24 October 2012

WA Diamonds (Western Australia)	3–2	(Victoria (state)) VIC Vipers
Pascov 32'; Slattery 38'; Wilson 42'	Report	Sneskov 53'; Messent 57'

Stadium:
Perth Hockey Stadium, Perth

24 October 2012

NSW Arrows (New South Wales)	4–0	(Northern Territory) NT Pearls
Morgan 6'; Khoury 23'; Brooks 54'; Pearce 67'	Report

Stadium:
Perth Hockey Stadium, Perth

=== Second round ===
==== Fifth to eighth place classification ====
Crossover
26 October 2012
(South Australia) SA Suns	7
(Tasmania) Tassie Van Demons	1
26 October 2012
(Australian Capital Territory) Canberra Strikers	2
(Northern Territory) NT Pearls	0

Fifth and Sixth Place
27 October 2012
(South Australia) SA Suns	1
(Australian Capital Territory) Canberra Strikers	2
Seventh and Eighth Place
27 October 2012
(Tasmania) Tassie Van Demons	2
(Northern Territory) NT Pearls	3

===== Crossover =====
26 October 2012

SA Suns (South Australia)	7–1	(Tasmania) Tassie Van Demons
Parker 9'; Sobels 23', 50'; Rudd 33', 44'; Pisani 46'; Claxton 70'	Report	Savory 31'

Stadium:
Perth Hockey Stadium, Perth

26 October 2012

Canberra Strikers (Australian Capital Territory)	2–0	(Northern Territory) NT Pearls
McInerney 26'; Glynn 31'	Report

Stadium:
Perth Hockey Stadium, Perth

===== Seventh and eighth place =====
27 October 2012

Tassie Van Demons (Tasmania)	2–3	(Northern Territory) NT Pearls
Cock 42'; Moore 55'	Report	Larosa 19', 49'; Youman 26'

Stadium:
Perth Hockey Stadium, Perth

===== Fifth and sixth place =====
27 October 2012

SA Suns (South Australia)	1–2	(Australian Capital Territory) Canberra Strikers
Pisani 39'	Report	Charlton 11'; Flanagan 14'

Stadium:
Perth Hockey Stadium, Perth

==== First to fourth place classification ====
Semi-Finals
26 October 2012
(Queensland) QLD Scorchers	1
(New South Wales) NSW Arrows	2
26 October 2012
(Western Australia) WA Diamonds	1
(Victoria (state)) VIC Vipers	2

Final
27 October 2012
(New South Wales) NSW Arrows	1
(Victoria (state)) VIC Vipers	5
Third and Fourth Place
27 October 2012
(Queensland) QLD Scorchers	3
(Western Australia) WA Diamonds	0

===== Semi-finals =====
26 October 2012

QLD Scorchers (Queensland)	1–2	(New South Wales) NSW Arrows
Marks 42'	Report	Morgan 28'; Khoury 60'

Stadium:
Perth Hockey Stadium, Perth

26 October 2012

WA Diamonds (Western Australia)	1–2	(Victoria (state)) VIC Vipers
Searle 33'	Report	21'; Messent 70'

Stadium:
Perth Hockey Stadium, Perth

===== Third and fourth place =====
27 October 2012

QLD Scorchers (Queensland)	3–0	(Western Australia) WA Diamonds
Holcroft 35'; Schulz 37'; Marks 67'	Report

Stadium:
Perth Hockey Stadium, Perth

===== Final =====
27 October 2012

NSW Arrows (New South Wales)	1–5	(Victoria (state)) VIC Vipers
Morgan 4'	Report	7'; Messent 26'; Riordan 30'; Ellis 35'; Schubach 37'

Stadium:
Perth Hockey Stadium, Perth

== Statistics ==
=== Final standings ===
Pos	Team	Pld	W	D	L	GF	GA	GD	Pts	Final Result
1st place, gold medalist(s)	(Victoria (state)) VIC Vipers	9	5	2	2	22	10	+12	17	Gold Medal
2nd place, silver medalist(s)	(New South Wales) NSW Arrows	9	4	2	3	12	11	+1	14	Silver Medal
3rd place, bronze medalist(s)	(Queensland) QLD Scorchers	9	7	0	2	23	7	+16	21	Bronze Medal
4	(Western Australia) WA Diamonds	9	5	1	3	15	12	+3	16	Fourth Place
5	(Australian Capital Territory) Canberra Strikers	9	5	0	4	22	16	+6	15	Fifth place
6	(South Australia) SA Suns	9	4	1	4	19	11	+8	13	Sixth Place
7	(Northern Territory) NT Pearls	9	2	1	6	7	20	−13	7	Seventh Place
8	(Tasmania) Tassie Van Demons	9	0	1	8	4	37	−33	1	Eighth Place

Source: Clearing House

=== Goalscorers ===
There were 125 goals scored in 36 matches, for an average of 3.47 goals per match.

6 goals

- (Queensland) Renee Ashton
- (Victoria (state)) Claire Messent

5 goals

- (Australian Capital Territory) Anna Flanagan
- (Queensland) Kandice Olivieri

4 goals

- (Australian Capital Territory) Peta MacKinnon
- (New South Wales) Georgina Morgan
- (South Australia) Brooklyn Buchecker
- (South Australia) Eloise Sobels
- (Victoria (state)) Georgia Nanscawen

3 goals

- (Northern Territory) Jasmine Larosa
- (Queensland) Katelin Marks
- (Queensland) Jodie Schulz
- (South Australia) Katie Pisani
- (Western Australia) Caitlin Pascov

2 goals

- (Australian Capital Territory) Naomi Evans
- (Australian Capital Territory) Katie Glynn
- (Australian Capital Territory) Kathryn McInerney
- (Australian Capital Territory) Toni Stewart
- (New South Wales) Nina Khoury
- (New South Wales) Hollie Webster
- (Queensland) Rebecca Reuter
- (South Australia) Georgie Parker
- (South Australia) Courtney Rudd
- (Tasmania) Tara Moore
- (Victoria (state)) Sam Ellis
- (Victoria (state)) Stephanie Riordan
- (Victoria (state)) Danielle Schubach
- (Western Australia) Ashleigh Nelson
- (Western Australia) Kathryn Slattery
- (Western Australia) Jodie Searle
- (Western Australia) Katy Symons
- (Western Australia) Georgia Wilson

1 goal

- (Australian Capital Territory) Edwina Bone
- (Australian Capital Territory) Meredith Bone
- (Australian Capital Territory) Samantha Charlton
- (Australian Capital Territory) Jenna Cartwright
- (Australian Capital Territory) Emma Taylor
- (New South Wales) Belinda Brooks
- (New South Wales) Emma McLeish
- (New South Wales) Kirsten Pearce
- (New South Wales) Emily Smith
- (Northern Territory) Britt Noffke
- (Northern Territory) Brooke Peris
- (Northern Territory) Danni Sutherland
- (Northern Territory) Nicole Youman
- (Queensland) Murphy Allendorf
- (Queensland) Tegan Holcroft
- (Queensland) Kirstin Johnson
- (South Australia) Jane Claxton
- (South Australia) Clarissa Eshuis
- (South Australia) Julia King
- (South Australia) Gabrielle Nance
- (Tasmania) Fiona Cock
- (Tasmania) Kate Savory
- (Victoria (state)) Anna Burns
- (Victoria (state)) Hana Peake
- (Victoria (state)) Rebecca Sneskov
- (Victoria (state)) Katy Symons
- (Victoria (state)) Erica Trahar
- (Western Australia) Jemma Buckley
- (Western Australia) Lisa Eglington

1 own goal

- (Queensland) QLD Scorchers (against NSW Arrows)

2 own goals

- (Victoria (state)) VIC Vipers (against NSW Arrows and WA Diamonds)

Source: Clearing House
