= Tassie Van Demons =

Australian field hockey club

- Full name: Tassie Van Demons
- Nickname(s): Van Demons
- Founded: 1996; 30 years ago
- Dissolved: 2019
- Colors: White, Green, Red
- Home ground: Tasmania Hockey Centre, Hobart

Personnel
- Captain: Sarah McCambridge
- Coach: Ilene Carr
Home	Away

The Tassie Van Demons were a nationally competing women's hockey team based in Tasmania, Australia. Coached by Ilene Carr, they competed in the Australian Hockey League. Some of the former coaches of the Van Demons include David Guest, Oliver Close, Zain Wright, and Ilene Carr.

== 2018 Australian Hockey League campaign ==
The Van Demons participated in the final Australian Hockey League (AHL) after it was announced by Hockey Australia that the national competition would be dissolved after the 2018 competition in favour of a "revamped" league in 2019. They were drawn in Pool A alongside the Canberra Strikers, NSW Arrows, and the Queensland Scorchers.

The Van Demons squad for the 2018 AHL was announced on 25 July 2018 with Ilene Carr again appointed as head coach. Brett Withington joined the staff as assistant coach with Greer Wells announced as the team manager. Maddison Curtis and Jemma Kenworthy withdrew from the initial squad and were replaced with Molly Haas and Laura Spandler. The squad was notable for being 100 per cent Tasmanian, with no international or out-of-state imports selected for the first time in years.

Tassie Van Demons 2018 AHL Squad
No.	Position	Name	Age*	Club	2018 Games	2018 Goals
1	Midfielder	Sofie McLeod	33	OHA	6	0
4	Defender	Nicole Geeves	34	DiamondBacks	3	0
5	Forward	Molly Haas	19	Derwent	0	0
7	Defender	Madeleine Hinton	21	University	6	0
9	Defender	Jessica Tremayne	32	Derwent	6	0
10	Midfielder	Blair Patten	27	Curtin Trinity (WA)	6	0
11	Forward	Laura Spandler	18	OHA	6	0
12	Forward	Ashleigh Arthur	23	North West Graduates	6	1
13	Midfielder	Samantha Lawrence	28	West Devonport	6	0
14	Defender	Louisa Jacobson	28	North West Graduates	6	0
15	Defender	Jean Flanagan	27	OHA	5	0
16	Forward	Nellie Paynter	20	OHA	4	0
18	Midfielder	Sarah McCambridge (C)	30	OHA	6	0
19	Midfielder	Eliza Westland	21	Derwent	6	0
24	Forward	Phillida Bridley	17	DiamondBacks	6	0
25	Forward	Julia Gunn	16	OHA	5	2
26	Goalkeeper	Evelyn Dalton	16	OHA	0	0
31	Goalkeeper	Ruby-Rose Haywood	21	DiamondBacks	6	0

*when announced.

=== Round 1 (Tasmanian Hockey Centre, Hobart) ===
The Van Demons played their first pool match against Canberra on Saturday, 6 October 2018 at their home ground the Tasmanian Hockey Centre in Hobart, Tasmania. The Strikers won 3–0 with Hockeyroo Naomi Evans scoring a field goal in the 12th minute, and Meredith Bone scoring a field goal and a field goal conversion in the 55th minute.

=== Round 2 (Tasmanian Hockey Centre, Hobart) ===
Their second pool match was against New South Wales on Sunday, 14 October 2018, again at their home ground the Tasmanian Hockey Centre. The Arrows fielded a strong team featuring five Australian national team representatives, compared to Tasmania's zero, and won comfortably 8–1. Jessica Watterson scored a field goal and a field goal conversion in the 13th minute, Kate Jenner scored from a penalty corner in the 26th minute, and Grace Stewart scored a field goal and a field goal conversion in the 30th minute to give the Arrows a 5–0 lead at half-time. Sarah Johnston scored from a penalty corner in the 54th minute and Grace Stewart again scored a field goal and conversion in the 55th minute, before Samantha Lawrence scored a consolation goal for the Van Demons in the 60th minute.

=== Round 3 (State Hockey Centre, Brisbane) ===
Tasmania's final pool match was away against Queensland on Saturday, 20 October 2018 at the State Hockey Centre in Brisbane, Queensland. The Scorchers fielded a star-studded team featuring eight Australian national team representatives, easily accounting for the Van Demons with a 15–0 win. Stephanie Kershaw scored a field goal and conversion in the 3rd minute, Rosie Malone did the same in the 10th minute, and Rebecca Greiner also scored a field goal and conversion in the 23rd minute. Queensland had their PumpPlay, where all goals (except for conversions) are worth 2, in the final five minutes of the first half, and during that period Malone scored a PumpPlay field goal and conversion, and Jodie Kenny scored a PumpPlay penalty stroke and conversion, to balloon the half-time score out to 12–0 in favour of the Scorchers. In the second half Queensland added only three more goals to their total, with Jordyn Holzberger scoring from a penalty corner in the 39th minute before Malone took her match tally to 7 with a field goal and conversion in the 46th minute.

=== Finals week (Gold Coast Hockey Centre, Gold Coast) ===
The Van Demons finished last in Pool A and went into the finals week at the Gold Coast Hockey Centre with a difficult path towards a title challenge, needing to beat the Victorian Vipers (who finished top of Pool B after winning all three of their games) in the quarter-final.

==== Quarter-final: Van Demons vs Vipers, Thursday 25 October 2018 ====
Victoria scored in the 5th minute with Hayley Padget scoring a field goal and conversion. In the second quarter they were awarded two penalty strokes in quick succession, in the 18th and 20th minutes, and these were converted by Madi Ratcliffe and Lily Brazel respectively. Brazel scored a field goal and conversion in the 41st minute to deliver Victoria a 6–0 win over Tasmania.

==== Classification match: Van Demons vs Diamonds, Saturday 27 October 2018 ====
Having each lost their quarter-finals the Van Demons faced the WA Diamonds in a classification match to determine their opponents for the final day of the AHL. Kathryn Slattery scored from a penalty corner in the 4th minute, as did Roos Broek in the 11th minute and Penny Squibb in the 20th minute to give WA an early 3–0 lead. Danielle Bestall scored a field goal and conversion in the 27th minute to make the score 5–0 at half-time. Slattery scored a field goal and field goal conversion in the 46th minute and Broek scored a PumpPlay field goal and conversion in the 59th minute to give the Diamonds a 10–0 win.

==== 7v8 playoff: Van Demons vs Pearls, Sunday 28 October 2018 ====
Tasmania and the Northern Territory, having lost all of their matches in the AHL, played off in the final classification match to decide their final competition standing. The Van Demons took the lead early, with young Australian Futures Squad player Julia Gunn scoring a field goal and field goal conversion in the 6th minute. Jacqueline Graf equalised for the Pearls in the 18th minute with her own field goal and conversion to send the teams into half-time locked at 2–2. Erin Lidbetter put the NT ahead in the 33rd minute, with a field goal and conversion, and Georgia Graf scored a field goal in the 41st minute to have the Pearls 5–2 ahead at three-quarter time. Ashleigh Arthur scored from a penalty corner in the 55th minute to give the Van Demons a late chance, but there were no goals scored in the final PumpPlay to deliver the NT Pearls a 5–3 win, consigning the Van Demons to an eighth-placed (last) finish in the AHL.

== 2017 Australian Hockey League campaign ==
The 2017 Australian Hockey League was held from 28 September to 8 October 2017 at the Perth Hockey Stadium. In addition to the eight traditional teams from the Australian States and Territories two national development sides from India and New Zealand competed in the tournament. Tasmania were drawn in Pool B with India, NSW Arrows, SA Suns, and VIC Vipers. The Van Demons squad for the 2017 AHL was announced on 1 September 2017, with Ilene Carr reappointed as head coach, Phil Marshall appointed as assistant coach, and Kathryn Arneman appointed as team manager. The squad was heavily supplemented with non-Tasmanian imports.

Tassie Van Demons 2017 AHL Squad
No.	Position	Name	Age*	Club	2017 Games	2017 Goals
4	Defender	Nicole Geeves	33	DiamondBacks	7	0
5	Forward	Molly Haas	18	Derwent	7	0
6	Defender	Jemma Kenworthy	20	City Marians	7	0
7	Defender	Madeleine Hinton	20	University	7	0
8	Forward	Fiona Cock	26	Hale (WA)	7	0
10	Midfielder	Blair Patten	26	Curtin Trinity (WA)	7	0
12	Forward	Ashleigh Arthur	22	North West Graduates	7	0
13	Forward	Catherine Webster	23	University	7	0
14	Defender	Louisa Jacobson	27	North West Graduates	7	0
16	Forward	Tanya Britz (South Africa)	23	Southern River HC (WA)	7	0
17	Midfielder	Tayla Britton	24	Hale (WA)	7	0
18	Midfielder	Sarah McCambridge (C)	29	OHA	7	1
19	Midfielder	Eliza Westland	20	Derwent	7	0
20	Midfielder	Layla Eleison	19	Hancock Brothers (QLD)	7	0
24	Forward	Teisha King	23	Mentone (VIC)	7	1
25	Defender	Michelle Harvey (Northern Ireland)	28	Pegasus (Northern Ireland)	7	0
31	Goalkeeper	Ruby-Rose Haywood	20	DiamondBacks	7	0
32	Goalkeeper	Merinda Sainty	25	University	1	0

*when announced.

=== Pool matches ===
Tasmania lost their first match against New South Wales 2–0, their second match against South Australia 5–0, their third match against Victoria 4–0, and their final pool match against the Indian development side 1–0 to finish bottom of their pool.

=== Classification matches ===
Missing out on the finals the Van Demons went into the second phase of the competition for final classification. They lost their first classification match against Canberra 1–0, lost their second match against Western Australia 3–1 despite Sarah McCambridge scoring a field goal in the 33rd minute, and then lost their final match against the Northern Territory 2–1 despite Teisha King scoring from a penalty corner in the 17th minute, to finish last (10th) overall.

== 2016 Australian Hockey League campaign ==
The 2016 Australian Hockey League was held from 29 September 2016 to 9 October 2016 at the Perth Hockey Stadium in Perth, Western Australia. In addition to the eight traditional State and Territory teams two additional teams participated in the tournament: a New Zealand development side and a Malaysian development side. The Van Demons were drawn in Pool A alongside the Canberra Strikers, Queensland Scorchers, Western Australia Diamonds, and the New Zealand development side. The Van Demons 2016 AHL squad was announced on 12 September 2016, with Ilene Carr again appointed as head coach, Paul Ancher continuing as assistant coach, and Melitta Smith again serving as team manager.

Tassie Van Demons 2016 AHL Squad
No.	Position	Name	Age*	Club	2016 Games	2016 Goals
2	Midfielder	Amelia Spence (C)	23	YMCC (WA)	7	1
3	Forward	Eleanor Brennan	22	North West Graduates	7	1
4	Defender	Nicole Geeves	32	DiamondBacks	7	1
6	Defender	Jemma Kenworthy	19	City Marians	7	0
7	Forward	Madeleine Hinton	19	University	7	0
8	Goalkeeper	Holly Bonde	31	Derwent	4	0
9	Defender	Jessica Tremayne	30	Derwent	7	0
10	Midfielder	Blair Patten	25	Curtin Trinity (WA)	7	0
11	Forward	Brigit Ikin	25	North West Graduates	7	0
12	Forward	Ashleigh Arthur	21	North West Graduates	7	0
15	Midfielder	Stephanie Blackwell	25	Mudgeeraba (QLD)	7	1
16	Midfielder	Ainsley McCallister (USA)	24	Whitfords (WA)	7	1
17	Midfielder	Tayla Britton	23	Hale (WA)	7	0
18	Midfielder	Sarah McCambridge	28	OHA	7	0
19	Defender	Eliza Westland	19	Derwent	7	0
21	Midfielder	Madeleine Murphy	19	OHA	7	1
26	Forward	Hannah Calvert	26	Canterbury	7	0
31	Goalkeeper	Ruby-Rose Haywood	19	DiamondBacks	3	0

*when announced.

=== Pool matches ===
==== Van Demons vs Scorchers, Thursday 29 September 2016 ====
Tasmania lost their opening match 2–0 in a tight contest against Queensland. Renee Taylor scored a field goal in the 19th minute for the Scorchers, then Jodie Kenny scored from a penalty corner in the 21st minute.

==== Van Demons vs Strikers, Saturday 1 October 2016 ====
Canberra defeated Tasmania in the second pool match 4–0. Naomi Evans scored a field goal in the 2nd minute, Meredith Bone scored a field goal in the 18th minute, and Anna Flanagan scored from a penalty corner in the 27th minute to give the Strikers a 3–0 lead at half-time. Laura Gray scored a field goal in the 44th minute to complete the scoring.

==== Van Demons vs Vipers, Monday 3 October 2016 ====
Tasmania played Pool B opponent Victoria in a cross-over match, losing 2–0 in a tough match. Madi Ratcliffe scored for the Vipers in the 9th minute to give them an early lead, but they had to wait until 44th minute to score their second, when Lily Brazel converted a penalty corner.

==== Van Demons vs Diamonds, Tuesday 4 October 2016 ====
Tasmania lost their fourth pool match against Western Australia in heart-breaking fashion, conceding a goal in the final minute of play. Caitlin Pascov scored a field goal for the Diamonds in the 9th minute, before Ainsley McCallister equalised in the 15th minute by scoring from a penalty corner. Annie Gibbs put WA back in front, scoring a penalty corner in the 24th minute, to make the score 2–1 at half-time. Van Demons Captain and former Australian National squad member Amelia Spence scored from a penalty corner in the 34th minute, just after half-time, but Melissa Luff scored from a penalty corner at the end of the game to deliver WA a narrow victory.

==== Van Demons vs New Zealand Futures, Wednesday 5 October 2016 ====
In their final pool match Tasmania drew 1–1 against the New Zealand development squad. Deanna Ritchie scored a field goal in the 15th minute for NZ, while Nicole Geeves scored from a penalty corner in the 29th minute for the Van Demons.

=== Classification matches ===
==== Van Demons vs Pearls, Friday 7 October 2016 ====
Failing to qualify for the finals Tasmania faced Northern Territory in their first classification match. They started strongly, with young star Madeleine Murphy scoring from a penalty corner in the 21st minute to give the Van Demons a 1–0 lead at half-time. However, Natasha Fitzsimmons scored twice in the second half for the Pearls, the first was from a penalty corner in the 37th minute, and the second was again from a penalty corner, this time in the final minute of the game, to give NT a 2–1 victory.

==== Van Demons vs Suns, Saturday 8 October 2016 ====
Tasmania played South Australia in their final classification match. Eleanor Brennan scored a field goal in the 27th minute, and Stephanie Blackwell scored a field goal in the 54th minute to give the Van Demons a 2–0 win that delivered them an eighth-placed finish out of ten teams.

== 2015 Australian Hockey League campaign ==
The 2015 Australian Hockey League was held from 25 September 2015 to 2 October 2015 in Sydney, New South Wales. The Van Demons were drawn in Pool A with the NSW Arrows, Canberra Strikers, and WA Diamonds. Ilene Carr was appointed as the Van Demons new head coach, with Paul Ancher joining her as assistant coach and Melitta Smith joining as team manager.

Tassie Van Demons 2015 AHL Squad
No.	Position	Name	Age*	Club	2015 Games	2015 Goals
2	Midfielder	Amelia Spence (C)^	22	YMCC (WA)	6	1
3	Forward	Eleanor Brennan	21	North West Graduates	6	1
4	Defender	Nicole Geeves	31	DiamondBacks	6	0
5	Forward	Madeleine Newlyn (England)	20	Loughborough (England)	6	1
7	Forward	Madeleine Hinton	18	University	6	1
8	Goalkeeper	Holly Bonde	30	Derwent	3	0
9	Defender	Jessica Tremayne	29	Derwent	6	0
10	Midfielder	Blair Patten	24	Curtin Trinity (WA)	6	0
11	Defender	Andrea Gillard	18	Lithgow (NSW)	6	0
12	Forward	Ashleigh Arthur	20	North West Graduates	6	0
13	Midfielder	Nicola Hammond	19	Greensborough (VIC)	6	0
17	Forward	Lily Kirkland	19	DiamondBacks	6	0
18	Midfielder	Sarah McCambridge	27	OHA	6	1
19	Defender	Eliza Westland	18	Derwent	6	0
21	Midfielder	Madeleine Murphy	18	OHA	6	0
22	Forward	Hannah Calvert (C)^	25	Canterbury	6	0
23	Midfielder	Emily Donovan	26	DiamondBacks	6	0
31	Goalkeeper	Ruby-Rose Haywood	18	DiamondBacks	3	0

*as of start of tournament.

^Co-Captains.

=== Pool matches ===
==== Van Demons vs Diamonds, Friday 25 September 2015 ====
Tasmania lost their opening pool match against Western Australia 2–0. Kim Lammers scored a field goal in the 45th minute and Kathryn Slattery scored from a penalty corner in the 52nd minute for the Diamonds.

==== Van Demons vs Arrows, Saturday 26 September 2015 ====
New South Wales delivered Tasmania a heavy 7–0 defeat in their second pool match. Greta Hayes scored from a penalty corner in the 4th minute and Emily Smith scored a field goal in the 6th minute to give NSW a 2–0 lead at half-time. Mariah Williams scored from a penalty corner in the 36th minute to give NSW a 3–0 lead at three-quarter time, before the Arrows took the game away with four goals in the final seven minutes. Cara Simpson scored a field goal in the 53rd minute, Emily Smith scored another field goal in the 54th minute, Grace Stewart scored a field goal in the 56th minute, and Lily Brazel completed the scoring with a field goal in the 60th minute.

==== Van Demons vs Strikers, Monday 28 September 2015 ====
Tasmania faced Canberra in their final pool match, losing 4–1. Anna Flanagan scored a hat-trick of penalty corner goals, in the 1st minute, the 34th minute, and the 37th minute. Sarah McCambridge dragged one back for the Van Demons with a field goal in the 44th minute, but Edwina Bone scored from a penalty corner in the 57th minute to give the Strikers the victory.

=== Classification matches ===
==== Van Demons vs Pearls, Tuesday 29 September 2015 ====
Tasmania played their first classification match against the Northern Territory. The Van Demons won 1–0, with Eleanor Brennan scoring a field goal in the 12th minute.

==== Van Demons vs Suns, Thursday 1 October 2015 ====
South Australia defeated Tasmania 2–1 in the second classification match. Charlotte Van Bodegom scored from a penalty corner in the 9th minute for the Suns, and Karri McMahon doubled their lead from a penalty corner in the 20th minute, with Madeleine Hinton scoring for Tasmania with a field goal in the 48th minute.

==== Van Demons vs Pearls, Friday 2 October 2015 ====
The final classification match, to determine seventh and eighth place, saw Tasmania play the Northern Territory again. Madeleine Newlyn scored a field goal in the 29th minute to give the Van Demons a 1–0 lead at half-time. Amy Swann equalised with a field goal in the 35th minute, and Mikaela Patterson scored from a penalty corner in the 45th minute to give the Pearls the lead, before Amelia Spence dramatically equalised for Tasmania from a penalty corner in the final minute, forcing the match to be decided by a penalty one-on-one shootout. Hannah Calvert for Tasmania and Rachel Divall for Northern Territory were the only players to score from the initial five rounds of the shootout, forcing a golden goal shootout. Calvert missed this time for the Van Demons, and Brooke Peris scored her attempt to end the match and give the Pearls a 2–2(2–1) win, meaning the Van Demons finished the tournament in eighth place (last).

== 2014 Australian Hockey League campaign ==
The 2014 Australian Hockey League was held from 4 October 2014 to 11 October 2014 in Brisbane, Queensland. The Van Demons were drawn in Pool B along with the NSW Arrows, SA Southern Suns, and the WA Diamonds. Former Australian Men's National team player Zain Wright was announced as the head coach, with Stewart Pither taking on the role of assistant coach and Marina Oakley taking the role of team manager.

Tassie Van Demons 2014 AHL Squad
No.	Position	Name	Age*	Club	2014 Games	2014 Goals
1	Goalkeeper	Amelia Gibson	23		6	0
2	Midfielder	Amelia Spence	21	YMCC (WA)	6	0
5		Madeline James	20	(QLD)	6	0
6	Defender	Michelle Cooling	27	North West Graduates	4	0
7		Renee Taylor	18	(QLD)	6	1
8	Defender	Abby Penfold	29	OHA	6	0
9	Defender	Jessica Tremayne (C)^	28	Derwent	6	0
10	Midfielder	Blair Patten	23	Curtin Trinity (WA)	6	1
11	Forward	Brigit Ikin (C)^	23	North West Graduates	6	0
12		Cara Evans	26		6	0
13		Claire Williams	17		6	0
14	Defender	Louisa Jacobson	24	North West Graduates	6	0
17	Goalkeeper	Emily Harvey	19	North West Graduates	3	0
18	Midfielder	Sarah McCambridge	26	OHA	6	1
21	Midfielder	Madeleine Murphy	17	OHA	6	0
22	Forward	Hannah Calvert (C)^	24	Canterbury	6	0
24		Hannah Reid	26		6	1
25	Forward	Grace Calvert	19	Canterbury	6	0

*at the start of the tournament.

^Co-Captains.

=== Pool matches ===
Tasmania started their campaign well with a 1–1 draw against South Australia, with Sarah McCambridge scoring their goal. However, they lost their second match against NSW 6–0, and their final pool match against Western Australia 7–0, to finish bottom of their group.

=== Classification matches ===
The Van Demons progressed into the 5–8 classification group. Their first match was against the Northern Territory, winning 2–0 thanks to penalty corner goals to Renee Taylor and Hannah Reid. They then lost their second classification match against Canberra 6–1, with Blair Patten scoring their only goal from a penalty corner, sending them into the 7v8 playoff.

=== 7v8 playoff ===
Tasmania met the Northern Territory again, this time playing off for the seventh and eighth place final classifications. The NT Pearls won 1–0, consigning the Van Demons to and eighth (last) placed finish in the tournament.

== Previous squads ==
=== 2013 Van Demons AHL squad ===
Oliver Close was appointed as head coach, Zain Wright, Larry Mills, and Stewart Pither were announced as assistant coaches. Jenny Geeves served as team manager.

Name
Tayla Britton
Emily Divin
Emily Donovan
Jean Flanagan
Nicole Geeves
Amelia Gibson (GK)
Brigit Ikin
Louisa Jacobson
Jackie Jones
Emily Lawson
Alyssa Marmion (GK)
Sarah McCambridge
Sofie McLeod
Isabelle O'Conor
Julia Reid
Ashley Robertson
Jessica Tremayne
Anne Woolford

=== 2012 Van Demons AHL squad ===
Craig Williams was appointed as the Van Demons Head coach for 2011, with Dougal Middleton and Jeff Aldridge joining as Assistant Coaches, and Jenny Geeves serving as team manager.

Name
Emma Hutchinson
Fiona Cock
Louise Mitterdorfer
Sarah Grey
Nicole Geeves
Tara Moore
Alysha Borg
Louisa Jacobson
Danica Mazzini
Kirstie Denning
Hannah Calvert
Emily Harvey (GK)
Kate Savory
Blair Patten
Amelia Spence
Nicky O’Donnell
Kim Hill
Michelle Cooling

=== 2011 Van Demons AHL squad ===
David Guest was announced as the Van Demons Head coach for the 2011 tournament, with Larry Mills as the assistant coach and Marina Oakley as the team manager.

Name
Harriet Moore
Eliza Flanagan
Sofie McLeod
Nina Khoury
Blair Patten
Fiona Pearce
Jackie Jones
Sam Pavish
Holly Dillon
Tayla Britton
Michelle Cooling
Hannah Calvert
Emily Wilson
Jessica Tremayne (C)
Nicole Geeves
Kirsten Pearce
Louisa Jacobson
Susan Kaye

== AHL record ==
Coach	Year	Record (W-D-L)	Final Standing	Individual Honours	Host
Ilene Carr	2018	0–0–6	8th (out of 8)		Multiple
Ilene Carr	2017	0–0–6	10th (out of 10)		Perth, Western Australia
Ilene Carr	2016	1–1–5	8th (out of 10)		Perth, Western Australia
Ilene Carr	2015	1–0–5	8th (out of 8)		Sydney, New South Wales
Zain Wright	2014	1–1–4	8th (out of 8)		Brisbane, Queensland
Oliver Close	2013	1–0–5	7th (out of 8)		Hobart, Tasmania
Craig Williams	2012	0–1–8	8th (out of 8)		Perth, Western Australia
David Guest	2011	2–1–8	8th (out of 8)	Leading Goalscorer – Sofie McLeod (9)	Multiple
	2010				
	2009	0–1–8	8th (out of 8)		Multiple
	2008	1–0–8	6th (out of 8)		Perth Western Australia
	2007				
	2006				
	2005				
	2004				
	2003				
	2002				
	2001				
	2000				
	1999				
	1998				
	1997				
	1996				

== See also ==
- Sports in Australia
- Field hockey in Australia
- Australia women's national field hockey team
