= Abigail Wilson =

Australian field hockey player

Personal information
- Born: 27 June 1998 (age 28) Bathurst, New South Wales

Sport
- Sport: Field hockey
- Position: Forward
Senior career
Years	Team	Caps	Goals
2016–2018	NSW Arrows	20	6
2019–	NSW Pride	33	28
National team
Years	Team	Caps	Goals
2018–2019	Australia U–21	7	(5)
2023–	Australia	43	(4)
Medal record
Women's field hockey
Representing Australia
Oceania Cup
Silver medal – second place	2025 Darwin
FIH Pro League
Bronze medal – third place	Season Four

Abigail Wilson (born 27 June 1998) is a field hockey player from Australia, who plays as a forward.

== Personal life ==
Abigail Wilson was born in Bathurst and raised in Lithgow, New South Wales

== Career ==
=== Domestic leagues ===
==== Australian Hockey League ====
In the Australian Hockey League (AHL), Wilson played for her home state as a member of the NSW Arrows. She made her AHL debut in 2016, winning a bronze medal. She followed this up with a bronze medal in 2017, and a gold medal in 2018 at the last edition of the tournament.

==== Hockey One ====
Following the overhaul of the AHL and subsequent introduction of the Hockey One, Wilson was named in the squad for New South Wales's new representative team, the NSW Pride. She made her debut for the team in the first game of the tournament, against the Adelaide Fire.

=== National teams ===
==== Under–21 ====
After debuting for the Australian Under–23 side in early November 2018, Wilson made her debut for the Jillaroos later that month during a Trans–Tasman test series against the New Zealand Under–21 side in Hastings, New Zealand.

==== Under–23 ====
Wilson made her debut for the Australian Under–23 side in November 2018, during a tour of China.

== International goals ==
The following is a list of international goals scored by Wilson:

Goal	Date	Location	Opponent	Score	Result	Competition	Ref.
1	25 April 2023	Ngā Puna Wai Sports Hub, Christchurch, New Zealand	New Zealand	2–1	2–1	2022–23 FIH Pro League	
2	17 August 2026	Wagener Stadium, Amsterdam, Netherlands	Netherlands	2–2	2–4	2026 FIH World Cup	
3	19 August 2026	Wagener Stadium, Amsterdam, Netherlands	Chile	2–1	4–4	2026 FIH World Cup	
4	21 August 2026	Wagener Stadium, Amsterdam, Netherlands	China	1–1	1–1	2026 FIH World Cup	
