= Kandice Olivieri =

Australian field hockey player

Kandice Shaw
Personal information
- Born: 16 April 1991 (age 35) Gold Coast, Queensland

Sport
- Sport: Field hockey
- Position: Forward
Senior career
Years	Team	Caps	Goals
2010–2012	QLD Scorchers	24	10
National team
Years	Team	Caps	Goals
2011	Australia U–21	4	(1)
2011–2013	Australia	12	(2)
Medal record
Women's field hockey
Representing Australia

Kandice Shaw (née Olivieri, born 16 April 1991) is a former field hockey player from Australia, who played as a forward.

== Personal life ==
Kandice Shaw was born and raised in Gold Coast, Queensland.

== Career ==
=== Domestic hockey ===
Until her retirement from representative hockey in 2017, Shaw competed for her home state, Queensland, in domestic hockey competitions.

In Hockey Australia's former premier domestic competition, the Australian Hockey League (AHL), Shaw was a member of the QLD Scorchers. She represented the team for three seasons, in 2011, 2012 and 2013. At the 2013 edition, she won her first and only national title.

=== International hockey ===
==== Hockeyroos ====
Shaw was first included in the Hockeyroos squad in 2011, following a 60 player training camp in Perth. Following her introduction to the squad, Shaw made her debut less than a month later during a Four-Nations Tournament in Mendoza. She continued appearing for the national team throughout 2011 until she was relegated to the development squad in June.

In 2013, Shaw returned to the national team during a test series against Korea in Perth.

==== International goals ====
Goal	Date	Location	Opponent	Score	Result	Competition	Ref.
1	10 February 2011	Estadio Mendocino de Hockey, Mendoza, Argentina	United States	1–0	1–0	Test Match	
2	16 February 2011	Estadio Mundialista de Hockey, Rosario, Argentina	Argentina	1–1	1–1	Test Match	
