= Airlie Ogilvie =

Australian field hockey player

Airlie Ogilvie (born 28 September 1987) is an Australian field hockey player. She is married to Simon Orchard, formerly of the Kookaburras.
