= Roos Broek =

Dutch-Australian field hockey player

Personal information
- Full name: Roos Broek
- Born: 28 September 1993 (age 32) Netherlands

Sport
- Sport: Field hockey
- Position: Midfielder
- Club: WA Diamonds
National team
Years	Team	Caps	Goals
2010–	Netherlands U18	6	(4)
Medal record
Women's field hockey
Representing Netherlands
Youth Olympic Games
Gold medal – first place	2010 Singapore	Team
Representing Australia

Roos Broek (born 28 September 1993) is a Dutch-Australian field hockey player.

Broek was part of the Netherlands women's junior national team that won gold at the 2010 Youth Olympic Games in Singapore.

Broek moved from the Netherlands to Australia to play hockey, and is currently a member of the Australian Women's Development Squad.
