= Lily Brazel =

Australian field hockey player

Personal information
- Born: 26 January 1995 (age 31) Sydney, New South Wales

Sport
- Sport: Field hockey
- Position: Defender
- Club: Victorian Vipers
National team
| Years | Team | Caps | Goals |
| 2017– | Australia | 47 | (1) |
Medal record
Women's field hockey
Representing Australia
FIH Pro League
| Silver medal – second place | 2019 Amstelveen |
Oceania Cup
| Silver medal – second place | 2019 Rockhampton |
Champions Trophy
| Silver medal – second place | 2018 Changzhou |

Lily Brazel (born 26 January 1995) is an Australian field hockey player.

Brazel was born in Sydney, New South Wales, and made her senior international debut at the 2017 International Festival of Hockey.

In May 2018, Brazel scored her first international goal at the 2018 Women's Tri-Nations Hockey Tournament in New Zealand, in a match against New Zealand.

Brazel was also a member of the Jillaroos, the Australian Under 21 women's team, at the 2013 Junior World Cup in Mönchengladbach, Germany, where the team finished 6th.
