= Meg Pearce =

Australian field hockey player

Personal information
- Born: 1 July 1994 (age 32)

Sport
- Sport: Field hockey
- Position: Defense, midfield
Senior career
Years	Team	Caps	Goals
2013–2018	Victorian Vipers	36	0
2019–	Brisbane Blaze	8	0
National team
Years	Team	Caps	Goals
2014	Australia U–21	4	(0)
2021–	Australia	2	(0)
Medal record
Women's field hockey
Representing Australia
Australian Youth Olympic Festival
Gold medal – first place	2013 Sydney	Team

Meg Pearce (born 1 July 1994) is an Australian field hockey player, who plays as a defender and midfielder.

== Personal life ==
Meg Pearce grew up in Melbourne, Victoria. Her father participates in Ironman events, and her mother runs in marathons. Following after her father and sister, both hockey players, she started playing hockey when six years old, at the Doncaster Hockey Club, in the eastern suburbs of Melbourne. After finishing secondary school, she studied arts at university, and began working as a personal trainer, before completing a double degree in commerce and nutrition. She played on the Under-21 Victorian state team in 2014 and 2015, and played with the Victorian Vipers, before moving to Brisbane. She joined Brisbane Blaze for the 2019 season. She later relocated to Perth, working in marketing for a financial services firm.

She is a scholarship holder at the Victorian Institute of Sport, as well as a member of Hockey Queensland's High Performance Squad.

== Career ==
=== Domestic league ===
From 2013 to 2018, Pearce was a member of the Victorian Vipers in the Australian Hockey League (AHL).

Following an overhaul of the AHL in 2019, Hockey Australia introduced a new premier domestic league, the Sultana Bran Hockey One. Pearce was named in Brisbane Blaze team for the inaugural season of the competition.

=== International ===
==== Under–21 ====
Pearce made her debut for the Australia U–21 team in 2013 at the Australian Youth Olympic Festival in Sydney. At the tournament, she won a gold medal.

==== Hockeyroos ====
In 2020, Pearce was named in the Hockeyroos squad for the first time.

She made her official debut for the team in 2021, during a test series against New Zealand in Palmerston North.
