= Rebecca Dwyer =

Australian field hockey player

Personal information
- Born: 11 July 1986 (age 40) Toowoomba, Queensland

Sport
- Sport: Field hockey
- Position: Midfielder
- Club: Queensland Scorchers
National team
Years	Team	Caps	Goals
2013–2014	Australia	14	(0)
Medal record
Women's field hockey
Representing Australia
Champions Trophy
Silver medal – second place	2014 Mendoza	Team

Rebecca Dwyer (née Reuter; born 11 July 1986) is an Australian field hockey player.

== Personal life ==
Dwyer was born and raised in Toowoomba, Queensland. She is a teacher at St Laurence's College in South Brisbane.

== Career ==
=== State level ===
In domestic competitions, Dwyer plays hockey for her home state, Queensland.

=== Hockeyroos ===
Dwyer made her senior international debut for the Hockeyroos in 2013, in a test match against Argentina in Perth, Western Australia.

In 2014, Dwyer appeared for the national team again, during a test series in New Zealand and at the Champions Trophy in Argentina, where she won a silver medal.
