= Edwina Bone =

Australian field hockey player

Personal information
- Full name: Edwina Claire Bone
- Born: 29 April 1988 (age 38) Orange, New South Wales, Australia
- Height: 1.70 m (5 ft 7 in)
- Weight: 70 kg (154 lb)

Sport
- Sport: Field hockey
- Position: Defender
- Club: Canberra Strikers
National team
Years	Team	Caps	Goals
2013–	Australia	194	(4)
Medal record
Women's field hockey
Representing Australia
World Cup
Silver medal – second place	2014 The Hague
Commonwealth Games
Gold medal – first place	2014 Glasgow	Team
Silver medal – second place	2018 Gold Coast	Team
FIH Pro League
Silver medal – second place	2019 Amstelveen
Oceania Cup
Silver medal – second place	2019 Rockhampton
Champions Trophy
Silver medal – second place	2014 Mendoza
Silver medal – second place	2018 Changzhou

Edwina Claire Bone (born 29 April 1988) is an Australian field hockey player. Her regular position is as a defender. Bone was a member of the Australia women's national field hockey team that were runners-up at the 2014 Women's Hockey World Cup. She was a member of the Australian team that defeated England in the women's field hockey final at the 2014 Commonwealth Games.

Edwina 'Eddie' Bone joined the Hockeyroos following two years in Hockey Australia's women's development program. She progressed through the junior ranks with the Canberra Strikers. Edwina established herself as a regular in the Hockeyroos' defense after a stellar 2014 season, claiming a gold medal at the Glasgow Commonwealth Games, and a silver medal at the World Cup and Champions Trophy. She also was part of the team that claimed 2nd place in the 2013 World League, as well as the team that won the 2013 Oceania Cup. She now has over 70 caps playing for Australia.

Bone qualified for the Tokyo 2020 Olympics. She was part of the Hockeyroos Olympics squad. The Hockeyroos lost 1–0 to India in the quarterfinals and therefore were not in medal contention.

Off the field, she studied a Bachelor of Sports Management at the University of Canberra. She hopes to become a sport coordinator or coach in the future.
