= Ashlea Fey =

Australian field hockey player

Personal information
- Nationality: Australian
- Born: 14 May 1992 (age 34) Sunshine Coast, Australia
- Height: 1.74

Sport
- Country: Australia
- Sport: Field hockey
Medal record
Women's field hockey
Representing Australia
Commonwealth Games
Silver medal – second place	2018 Gold Coast
Oceania Cup
Gold medal – first place	2017 Sydney

Ashlea Fey (born 14 May 1992) is an Australian field hockey player.

Fey was born on the Sunshine Coast, Queensland, and made her senior international debut in the Trans-Tasman Trophy against New Zealand in November 2016.

Fey is also a prominent player in the Australian women's national indoor team, playing in the 2015 Women's Indoor Hockey World Cup in Leipzig, Germany, where the team finished 8th.
