= Jordyn Holzberger =

Australian field hockey player (born 1993)

Personal information
- Full name: Jordyn Holzberger
- Born: 27 August 1993 (age 33) Ipswich, Queensland

Sport
- Sport: Field hockey
- Position: Midfielder
- Club: Queensland Scorchers
National team
Years	Team	Caps	Goals
2012–	Australia	63	(7)
Medal record
Women's field hockey
Representing Australia
Commonwealth Games
Silver medal – second place	2018 Gold Coast	Team
Oceania Cup
Gold medal – first place	2013 Sydney	Team

Jordyn Holzberger (born 27 August 1993) is an Australian field hockey player.

Holzberger was born in Ipswich, Queensland, and made her senior international debut in a test series against Korea in March 2012.

Holzberger was part of the Australian team that won silver at the 2018 Commonwealth Games held in Gold Coast, Australia.
