= Penny Squibb =

Australian field hockey player

Personal information
- Born: 9 February 1993 (age 33) Tambellup, Western Australia, Australia

Sport
- Sport: Field hockey
- Position: Defender
- Club: WA Diamonds
National team
Years	Team	Caps	Goals
2011	Australia U–21	4	(1)
2018–	Australia	51	(6)
Medal record
Women's field hockey
Representing Australia
World Cup
Bronze medal – third place	2022 Terrassa/Amstelveen
Oceania Cup
Gold medal – first place	2023 Whangārei
FIH Pro League
Bronze medal – third place	2022–23
Commonwealth Games
Silver medal – second place	2022 Birmingham	Team
Champions Trophy
Silver medal – second place	2018 Changzhou

Penny Squibb (born 9 February 1993) is an Australian field hockey player.

== Career ==
=== National Representation ===
Squibb plays representative hockey for her home state, Western Australia, in national competition. She represents the WA Diamonds in the Australian Hockey League. At the 2017 tournament, Squibb was equal highest scorer, with 7 goals.

=== International Representation ===
==== Jillaroos ====
Squibb made her debut for the Australia U–21 team during a Four Nations Tournament in New Delhi.

==== Hockeyroos ====
In 2017, Squibb was named in the Australian national development squad for the first time.

Squibb is set to make her international debut for Australia in November 2018, at the Hockey Champions Trophy. Squibb is one of four players included in the team who are not part of Hockey Australia's centralised training program.

Squibb qualified for the Tokyo 2020 Olympics. She was part of the Hockeyroos Olympics squad. The Hockeyroos lost 1–0 to India in the quarterfinals and therefore were not in medal contention.

=== International goals ===
Goal	Date	Location	Opponent	Score	Result	Competition	Ref.
1	24 November 2018	Wujin Hockey Stadium, Changzhou, China	Japan	1–3	1–3	2018 FIH Champions Trophy	
2	27 June 2021	Perth Hockey Stadium, Perth, Australia	New Zealand	2–1	3–1	2020–21 FIH Pro League	
3	6 July 2022	Estadi Olímpic de Terrassa, Terrassa, Spain	South Africa	1–0	2–1	2022 FIH World Cup	
4	31 July 2022	University of Birmingham Hockey Centre, Birmingham, England	South Africa	1–0	5–0	2022 Commonwealth Games	
5	31 July 2022	University of Birmingham Hockey Centre, Birmingham, England	South Africa	5–0	5–0	2022 Commonwealth Games	
6	1 June 2024	Wilrijkse Plein, Antwerp, Belgium	Argentina	1–0	1–0	2023–24 FIH Pro League	
7	5 February 2025	Sydney Olympic Park, Sydney, Australia	Spain	2–1	4–1	2024–25 FIH Pro League	
