= Kathryn Slattery =

Australian field hockey player

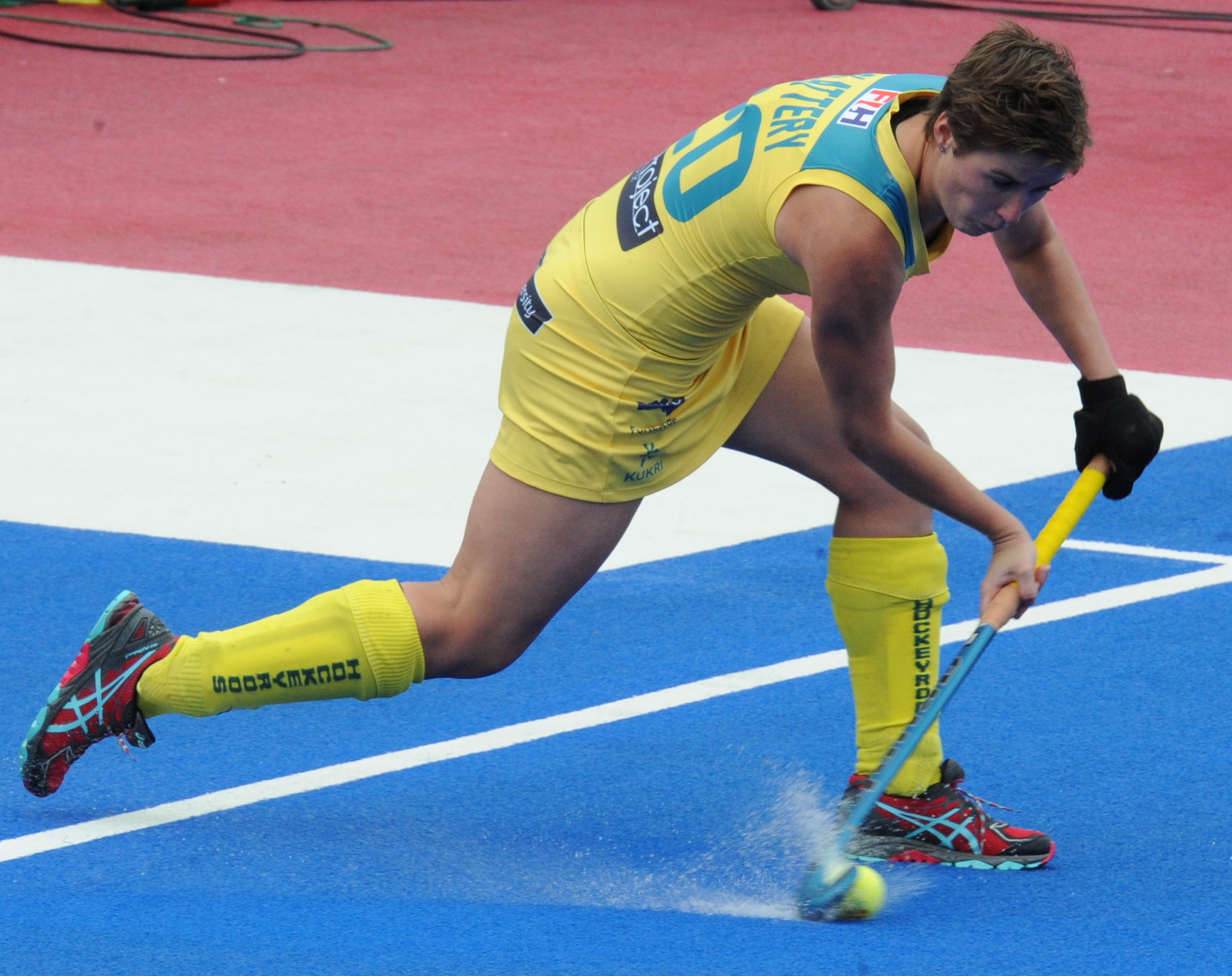

Personal information
- Born: 30 July 1993 (age 33) South Stirling, Western Australia, Australia
- Height: 1.73 m (5 ft 8 in)
- Weight: 68 kg (150 lb)

Sport
- Sport: Field hockey
- Position: Forward
- Club: Royal Antwerp Hockey Club
National team
| Years | Team | Caps | Goals |
| 2014– | Australia | 91 | (37) |
Medal record
Women's field hockey
Representing Australia
Champions Trophy
| Silver medal – second place | 2014 Mendoza |
Oceania Cup
| Gold medal – first place | 2017 Sydney |

Kathryn Slattery (born 30 July 1993) is an Australian field hockey player. She represented her country at the 2016 Summer Olympics, in Rio De Janeiro . She has played both as a midfielder r and more recently as a forward.

Slattery was born and grew up in the 10,000 acres (4,047 ha) family farm, Bundeera, in the small town of South Stirling in the Great Southern region of Western Australia along with her twin sister Meg, older sister Jess and older brother Matthew. She has a degree in Agribusiness from Curtin University. In 2013 she played in the Australian Youth Olympic festival and scored one of the two goals in the 2-1 gold medal win against China. Slattery then made her senior international debut against New Zealand and was member of the silver medal winning team at the 2014 Champions Trophy, scoring a goal in the final. She was selected in the national team in 2015 and remained in the squad until her retirement. She played in a number of major tournaments, including the 2018 World Cup in London. She retired from international hockey at the end of 2018, and then travelled to Belgium to play for Royal Antwerp Hockey Club in the 2019 season. She played 91 games for Australia and scored 37 goals. She now resides in Albany, WA.
