= Naomi Evans =

Australian field hockey player

Personal information
- Born: 17 January 1992 (age 34) Goulburn, New South Wales

Sport
- Sport: Field hockey
- Position: Attacker
- Club: Canberra Strikers
National team
Years	Team	Caps	Goals
2018–	Australia	4	(1)
Medal record
Women's field hockey
Representing Australia

Naomi Evans (born 17 January 1992) is an Australian field hockey player.

== Career ==
Evans was born in Goulburn, New South Wales, however she plays club hockey for the ACT team Canberra Strikers.

Evans made her international debut at the 2018 Sompo Cup in Ibaraki, Japan.

As of May 2018, Evans is a member of the Australian women's national development squad.
