= Hockey Four Nations Cup =

International women's field hockey tournament

- Most recent season or competition: 2018 Women's Four Nations Cup
- Sport: Field hockey
- Founded: 2008
- Folded: 2018
- No. of teams: 4
- Country: Germany
- Continent: EHF (Europe)
- Last champion: Netherlands (1st title)
- Most titles: Germany (3 titles)

The Hockey Four Nations Cup was an international women's field hockey tournament held by the International Hockey Federation and the Deutscher Hockey-Bund.

The Netherlands are the reigning champions.

== Format ==
Since its inception in 2008, the tournament has been an invitational event, allowing four nations to compete against one another. The tournament is played in a single round-robin system, with the nation finishing at the top of the table being declared the tournament champions.

The tournament generally comprises teams within the top 10 of the FIH World Rankings.

== Results ==
=== Summaries ===
Year	Host	Winner	Runner-up	Third place	Fourth place
2008	Bremen	Germany	South Korea	United States	India
2010	Essen	Australia	Germany	India	Ireland
2011	Berlin	Argentina	Germany	Australia	South Korea
2012	Bremen	Germany	New Zealand	South Africa	Belgium
2014	Bremen	Australia	Germany	England	Japan
2016	Hamburg	Argentina	Germany	China	South Korea
2017	Berlin	Germany	Ireland	China	South Korea
2018	Grünwald	Netherlands	Argentina	New Zealand	Germany

=== Team appearances ===
Team	2008	2010	2011	2012	2014	2016	2017	2018	Total
Argentina	–	–	1st	–	–	1st	–	2nd	3
Australia	–	1st	3rd	–	1st	–	–	–	3
Belgium	–	–	–	4th	–	–	–	–	1
China	–	–	–	–	–	3rd	3rd	–	2
England	–	–	–	–	3rd	–	–	–	1
Germany	1st	2nd	2nd	1st	2nd	2nd	1st	4th	7
India	4th	3rd	–	–	–	–	–	–	2
Ireland	–	4th	–	–	–	–	2nd	–	2
Japan	–	–	–	–	4th	–	–	–	1
Netherlands	–	–	–	–	–	–	–	1st	1
New Zealand	–	–	–	2nd	–	–	–	3rd	2
South Africa	–	–	–	3rd	–	–	–	–	1
South Korea	2nd	–	4th	–	–	4th	4th	–	4
United States	3rd	–	–	–	–	–	–	–	1
Total	4	4	4	4	4	4	4	4	32

== Statistics ==
=== All-Time Table ===
Table
Pos	Team	Pld	W	D	L	GF	GA	GD	Pts	PCT
1	Netherlands	3	3	0	0	9	2	+7	9	100.0
2	Argentina	9	7	1	1	18	9	+9	22	81.4
3	Australia	9	5	3	1	29	16	+13	18	66.7
4	Germany	24	12	5	7	61	39	+22	41	56.9
5	New Zealand	6	3	0	3	12	15	–3	9	50.0
6	China	6	2	1	3	8	11	–3	7	38.9
7	England	3	1	0	2	5	7	–2	3	33.3
7	South Africa	3	1	0	2	5	7	–2	3	33.3
9	Belgium	3	1	0	2	4	8	–4	3	33.3
10	Ireland	6	2	0	4	7	20	–13	6	33.3
11	India	6	1	2	3	16	26	–10	5	27.8
12	South Korea	12	2	3	7	25	24	+1	9	25.0
13	United States	3	0	1	2	6	13	–7	1	11.1
14	Japan	3	0	0	3	1	9	–8	0	0.0

=== All-time goalscorers ===
There were 206 goals scored in 48 matches, for an average of 4.29 goals per match.

10 goals

- (Germany) Natascha Keller

6 goals

- (Germany) Tina Bachmann

5 goals

- (Australia) Megan Rivers
- (Germany) Marie Mävers
- (India) Surinder Kaur
- (South Korea) Lee Seon-Ok

4 goals

- (Argentina) Noel Barrionuevo
- (Argentina) Delfina Merino
- (Australia) Nicole Arrold
- (Australia) Georgina Parker
- (Germany) Lydia Haase
- (Germany) Maike Stöckel
- (Germany) Fanny Rinne
- (South Africa) Pietie Coetzee
- (South Korea) Gim Sung-Hee

3 goals

- (Argentina) Carla Rebecchi
- (Australia) Anna Flanagan
- (Australia) Jodie Kenny
- (Australia) Ashleigh Nelson
- (England) Alexandra Danson
- (Germany) Lisa Altenburg
- (Germany) Eileen Hoffmann
- (Germany) Nike Lorenz
- (Germany) Katharina Otte
- (India) Rani Rampal
- (United States) Tiffany Snow

2 goals

- (Australia) Emily Smith
- (China) Sun Xiao
- (England) Lily Owsley
- (Germany) Janine Beermann
- (Germany) Kristina Hillmann
- (Germany) Anke Kühn
- (India) Jasjeet Kaur Handa
- (India) Deepika Thakur
- (Ireland) Kathryn Mullan
- (Netherlands) Frédérique Matla
- (Netherlands) Lauren Stam
- (New Zealand) Shiloh Gloyn
- (New Zealand) Charlotte Harrison
- (New Zealand) Samantha Harrison
- (South Korea) Kim Da-Rae
- (South Korea) Kim Jong-Eun
- (South Korea) Kim Mi-Seon

1 goal

- (Argentina) Gabriela Aguirre
- (Argentina) Agustina Albertario
- (Argentina) Martina Cavallero
- (Argentina) Soledad García
- (Argentina) María José Granatto
- (Argentina) Rosario Luchetti
- (Argentina) Rocío Sánchez Moccia
- (Australia) Madonna Blyth
- (Australia) Edwina Bone
- (Australia) Emily Hurtz
- (Australia) Georgia Nanscawen
- (Australia) Renee Trost
- (Belgium) Jill Boon
- (Belgium) Erica Coppey
- (Belgium) Stéphanie de Groof
- (Belgium) Emilie Sinia
- (China) Zhang Jinrong
- (China) Liang Meiyu
- (China) Zhong Mengling
- (China) Zhang Xiaoxue
- (China) Peng Yang
- (China) Zhao Yudiao
- (Germany) Hannah Gablać
- (Germany) Lina Geyer
- (Germany) Franzisca Hauke
- (Germany) Julia Müller
- (Germany) Camille Nobis
- (Germany) Katharina Scholz
- (Germany) Anne Schröder
- (Germany) Lisa Schütze
- (Germany) Charlotte Stapenhorst
- (Germany) Jana Teschke
- (India) Saba Anjum
- (India) Subhadra Pradhan
- (India) Rosalin Ralte
- (India) Chanchan Thokchom
- (Ireland) Shirley McCay
- (Ireland) Anna O'Flanagan
- (Ireland) Roisin Upton
- (Ireland) Emma Smyth
- (Ireland) Chloe Watkins
- (Japan) Ayaka Nishimura
- (Netherlands) Margot van Geffen
- (Netherlands) Caia van Maasakker
- (Netherlands) Maria Verschoor
- (Netherlands) Xan de Waard
- (Netherlands) Lidewij Welten
- (New Zealand) Madison Doar
- (New Zealand) Katie Glynn
- (New Zealand) Anita McLaren
- (New Zealand) Stacey Michelsen
- (New Zealand) Brooke Neal
- (New Zealand) Amy Robinson
- (South Africa) Jennifer Wilson
- (South Korea) Cheon Eun-Bi
- (South Korea) Cho Eun-Ji
- (South Korea) Jang Hee-Sun
- (South Korea) Park Jeong-Sook
- (South Korea) Kim Jong-Hee
- (South Korea) Park Mi-Hyun
- (South Korea) Eum Mi-young
- (South Korea) Cheon Seul-Ki
- (South Korea) Kim Young-Ran
- (South Korea) Cho Yun-Kyoung
- (United States) Kelly Doton
- (United States) Carrie Lingo
- (United States) Keli Smith
