= 2012–13 Women's FIH Hockey World League Semifinals =

Field hockey tournament

Tournament details
- Dates: 13–30 June 2013
- Teams: 16 (from 5 confederations)
- Venue: 2 (in 2 host cities)

Tournament statistics
- Matches played: 48
- Goals scored: 207 (4.31 per match)
- Top scorer: (China) Li Hongxia (7 goals)

The 2012–13 Women's FIH Hockey World League Semifinals took place in June 2013. A total of 16 teams competing in 2 events were part in this round of the tournament playing for 7 berths in the Final, played from 30 November to 8 December 2013 in San Miguel de Tucumán, Argentina.

This round also served as a qualifier for the 2014 Women's Hockey World Cup as the six highest placed teams apart from the host nation and the five continental champions qualified.

== Qualification ==
8 teams ranked between 1st and 8th in the FIH World Rankings current at the time of seeking entries for the competition qualified automatically, in addition to 8 teams qualified from Round 2. The following sixteen teams, shown with final pre-tournament rankings, competed in this round of the tournament.

Dates	Event	Location	Quotas	Qualifier(s)
	Ranked 1st to 8th in the FIH World Rankings		8	Argentina (2); Netherlands (1); Germany (5); China (7); England (4); Australia (6); New Zealand (3); South Korea (8)
21–27 January 2013	2012–13 FIH Hockey World League Round 2	Cape Town, South Africa	2	South Africa (11); Belgium (13)
18–24 February 2013	2012–13 FIH Hockey World League Round 2	New Delhi, India	2	India (12); Japan (9)
25 February–3 March 2013	2012–13 FIH Hockey World League Round 2	Valencia, Spain	2	Italy (17); Spain (15)
4–10 March 2013	2012–13 FIH Hockey World League Round 2	Rio de Janeiro, Brazil	2	United States (10); Chile (18)
Total			16	

== Rotterdam ==

Tournament details
- Host country: Netherlands
- City: Rotterdam
- Dates: 13–22 June 2013
- Teams: 8
- Venue: HC Rotterdam

Final positions
- Champions: Germany
- Runner-up: Netherlands
- Third place: South Korea

Tournament statistics
- Matches played: 24
- Goals scored: 116 (4.83 per match)
- Top scorer: (Netherlands) Maartje Paumen (6 goals)
- Best player: (New Zealand) Kayla Sharland

=== Umpires ===
Below are the 10 umpires appointed by the International Hockey Federation:

- Claire Adenot (FRA)
- Stella Bartlema (NED)
- Karen Bennett (NZL)
- Lynn Cowie-McAlister (AUS)
- Carolina de la Fuente (ARG)
- Elena Eskina (RUS)
- Amy Hassick (USA)
- Michelle Joubert (RSA)
- Miao Lin (CHN)
- Maricel Sánchez (ARG)

=== First round ===
==== Pool A ====
Pos	Team	Pld	W	D	L	GF	GA	GD	Pts
1	Netherlands	3	2	1	0	13	1	+12	7
2	South Korea	3	2	0	1	6	6	0	6
3	Japan	3	1	1	1	10	5	+5	4
4	Chile	3	0	0	3	1	18	−17	0

Source: FIH
Rules for classification: 1) points; 2) goal difference; 3) goals scored; 4) head-to-head result.

13 June 2013
13:30

South Korea	2–1	Chile
Kim Jong-E. 50'; Cheon E. 63'	Report	Vidaurre 37'

Umpires:
Elena Eskina (RUS)
Lynn Cowie-McAlister (AUS)

13 June 2013
18:00

Netherlands	1–1	Japan
Paumen 28'	Report	Shibata 59'

Umpires:
Michelle Joubert (RSA)
Karen Bennett (NZL)

14 June 2013
18:00

Japan	6–0	Chile
Komazawa 6'; Arai 12', 29', 57'; Shibata 41', 43'	Report

Umpires:
Claire Adenot (FRA)
Karen Bennett (NZL)

14 June 2013
20:00

South Korea	0–2	Netherlands
	Report	Lammers 42'; Jonker 69'

Umpires:
Carolina de la Fuente (ARG)
Amy Hassick (USA)

16 June 2013
09:30

Japan	3–4	South Korea
Nakagawa 15'; Komazawa 22'; Nishimura 25'	Report	Oh 30'; Park M. 42'; Kim Y. 59'; An 68'

Umpires:
Elena Eskina (RUS)
Karen Bennett (NZL)

16 June 2013
16:30

Netherlands	10–0	Chile
Mol 10', 15'; De Goede 13'; Paumen 14', 19', 25'; Hoog 29', 56'; Jonker 58', 59'	Report

Umpires:
Claire Adenot (FRA)
Miao Lin (CHN)

==== Pool B ====
Pos	Team	Pld	W	D	L	GF	GA	GD	Pts
1	Germany	3	3	0	0	13	3	+10	9
2	New Zealand	3	2	0	1	13	5	+8	6
3	Belgium	3	0	1	2	3	8	−5	1
4	India	3	0	1	2	2	15	−13	1

Source: FIH
Rules for classification: 1) points; 2) goal difference; 3) goals scored; 4) head-to-head result.

13 June 2013
09:00

New Zealand	7–0	India
Harrison 8', 52'; 16'; Glynn 26', 69'; Fremaux 31'; Forgesson 53'	Report

Umpires:
Carolina de la Fuente (ARG)
Claire Adenot (FRA)

13 June 2013
11:00

Germany	3–0	Belgium
Müller 18'; Bachmann 24'; 42'	Report

Umpires:
Stella Bartlema (NED)
Maricel Sánchez (ARG)

14 June 2013
13:30

India	1–1	Belgium
Barla 38'	Report	Coppey 4'

Umpires:
Miao Lin (CHN)
Lynn Cowie-McAlister (AUS)

14 June 2013
15:30

Germany	3–2	New Zealand
Müller 8'; Hoffmann 15'; Hauke 67'	Report	Harrison 66'; Sharland 70'

Umpires:
Michelle Joubert (RSA)
Elena Eskina (RUS)

16 June 2013
11:30

India	1–7	Germany
Katariya 43'	Report	Müller-Wieland 14'; Stöckel 21', 44'; Mävers 35'; Plass 49'; Haase 54'; Krüger 67'

Umpires:
Amy Hassick (USA)
Maricel Sánchez (ARG)

16 June 2013
14:00

New Zealand	4–2	Belgium
Forgesson 21'; Sharland 25'; Flynn 29'; Glynn 38'	Report	Versavel 52'; Coppey 68'

Umpires:
Stella Bartlema (NED)
Lynn Cowie-McAlister (AUS)

=== Second round ===
Quarter-finals
18 June 2013
Netherlands	8
India	1
18 June 2013
New Zealand	3
Japan	1
18 June 2013
South Korea	2
Belgium	1
18 June 2013
Germany	2
Chile	0

Semi-finals
20 June 2013
Netherlands	5
New Zealand	2
20 June 2013
South Korea	2
Germany	3

Final
22 June 2013
Netherlands	1 (3)
Germany (p.s.o)	1 (4)
Third place
22 June 2013
New Zealand	3 (2)
South Korea (p.s.o)	3 (3)

==== Quarter-finals ====
18 June 2013
12:30

New Zealand	3–1	Japan
Forgesson 40'; Punt 54'; Harrison 66'	Report	2'

Umpires:
Michelle Joubert (RSA)
Carolina de la Fuente (ARG)

18 June 2013
14:30

Germany	2–0	Chile
Stöckel 21'; Mävers 67'	Report

Umpires:
Stella Bartlema (NED)
Amy Hassick (USA)

18 June 2013
17:00

South Korea	2–1	Belgium
Park M. 14'; Kim Jong-E. 18'	Report	Nelen 1'

Umpires:
Miao Lin (CHN)
Elena Eskina (RUS)

18 June 2013
20:00

Netherlands	8–1	India
Lammers 21'; Paumen 33', 65'; Hoog 44'; Magis 49'; De Goede 57', 70'; Mol 63'	Report	Katariya 48'

Umpires:
Maricel Sánchez (ARG)
Claire Adenot (FRA)

==== Fifth to eighth place classification ====
Crossover
20 June 2013
India	0
Japan	4
20 June 2013
Belgium	4
Chile	2

Fifth place match
22 June 2013
Japan	3
Belgium	1
Seventh place match
22 June 2013
India	2
Chile	1

===== Crossover =====
20 June 2013
12:30

India	0–4	Japan
	Report	Nishimura 2'; Otsuka 18', 36'; Nagai 54'

Umpires:
Miao Lin (CHN)
Karen Bennett (NZL)

20 June 2013
14:30

Belgium	4–2	Chile
Coppey 11', 56'; De Scheemaekere 27'; Boon 38'	Report	Villalabeitia 18'; 44'

Umpires:
Amy Hassick (USA)
Lynn Cowie-McAlister (AUS)

===== Seventh and eighth place =====
22 June 2013
09:30

India	2–1	Chile
Arya 47'; Thokchom 56'	Report	Caram 44'

Umpires:
Karen Bennett (NZL)
Maricel Sánchez (ARG)

===== Fifth and sixth place =====
22 June 2013
11:30

Japan	3–1	Belgium
Komazawa 4'; Otsuka 7'; Oikawa 43'	Report	Raes 64'

Umpires:
Stella Bartlema (NED)
Amy Hassick (USA)

==== First to fourth place classification ====
===== Semi-finals =====
20 June 2013
17:00

South Korea	2–3	Germany
Cheon S. 55', 61'	Report	Haase 32'; Müller 66'; Hoffmann 69'

Umpires:
Carolina de la Fuente (ARG)
Elena Eskina (RUS)

20 June 2013
20:00

Netherlands	5–2	New Zealand
Van Geffen 4'; Lammers 13', 54'; Jonker 16'; Van Male 55'	Report	Webster 25'; Glynn 62'

Umpires:
Michelle Joubert (RSA)
Claire Adenot (FRA)

===== Third and fourth place =====
22 June 2013
14:00

New Zealand	3–3	South Korea
Forgesson 12'; Glynn 24'; Sharland 27'	Report	Han 1', 29'; Park S. 16'
Penalties
Sharland (penalty shoot-out scored); Punt (penalty shoot-out missed); Charlton (penalty shoot-out scored); Harrison (penalty shoot-out missed); Flynn (penalty shoot-out missed)	2–3	(penalty shoot-out missed) Han; (penalty shoot-out missed) Kim D. (penalty shoot-out scored) Cheon E. (penalty shoot-out scored) Cho E. (penalty shoot-out scored) Park S.

Umpires:
Claire Adenot (FRA)
Miao Lin (CHN)

===== Final =====
22 June 2013
16:30

Netherlands	1–1	Germany
Lammers 23'	Report	Müller-Wieland 69'
Penalties
De Goede (penalty shoot-out scored); Hoog (penalty shoot-out scored); Lammers (penalty shoot-out missed); Dirkse van den Heuvel (penalty shoot-out missed); Van Maasakker (penalty shoot-out scored)	3–4	(penalty shoot-out scored) Stöckel; (penalty shoot-out scored) Müller; (penalty shoot-out missed) Andersch; (penalty shoot-out scored) Mävers; (penalty shoot-out scored) Hauke

Umpires:
Michelle Joubert (RSA)
Carolina de la Fuente (ARG)

=== Awards ===
Top Goalscorer	Player of the Tournament	Goalkeeper of the Tournament	Young Player of the Tournament
(Netherlands) Maartje Paumen	(New Zealand) Kayla Sharland	(South Korea) Lee Sin-hye	(Netherlands) Maria Verschoor

== London ==

Tournament details
- Host country: England
- City: London
- Dates: 22–30 June 2013
- Teams: 8
- Venue: Quintin Hogg Memorial Sports Ground

Final positions
- Champions: Australia
- Runner-up: England
- Third place: Argentina

Tournament statistics
- Matches played: 24
- Goals scored: 91 (3.79 per match)
- Top scorer: (China) Li Hongxia (7 goals)

=== Umpires ===
Below are the 10 umpires appointed by the International Hockey Federation:

- Frances Block (ENG)
- Caroline Brunekreef (NED)
- Laurine Delforge (BEL)
- Soledad Iparraguirre (ARG)
- Kang Hyun-young (KOR)
- Michelle Meister (GER)
- Hannah Sanders (ENG)
- Chieko Soma (JPN)
- Wendy Stewart (CAN)
- Melissa Trivic (AUS)

=== First round ===
==== Pool A ====
Pos	Team	Pld	W	D	L	GF	GA	GD	Pts
1	Argentina	3	3	0	0	8	2	+6	9
2	China	3	2	0	1	6	5	+1	6
3	Italy	3	1	0	2	3	7	−4	3
4	United States	3	0	0	3	2	5	−3	0

Source: FIH
Rules for classification: 1) points; 2) goal difference; 3) goals scored; 4) head-to-head result.

22 June 2013
11:30

China	2–1	Italy
Li H. 8', 65'	Report	Braconi 59'

Umpires:
Soledad Iparraguirre (ARG)
Laurine Delforge (BEL)

22 June 2013
14:00

Argentina	1–0	United States
Luchetti 68'	Report

Umpires:
Frances Block (ENG)
Caroline Brunekreef (NED)

23 June 2013
12:00

United States	1–2	Italy
Kasold 22'	Report	Ronsisvalli 28'; Tosco 70'

Umpires:
Chieko Soma (JPN)
Hannah Sanders (ENG)

23 June 2013
14:30

China	2–3	Argentina
Li H. 42'; Wang 61'	Report	Luchetti 12'; Rebecchi 27', 69'

Umpires:
Melissa Trivic (AUS)
Michelle Meister (GER)

25 June 2013
12:30

United States	1–2	China
Selenski 11'	Report	Li H. 14'; Wang 61'

Umpires:
Wendy Stewart (CAN)
Soledad Iparraguirre (ARG)

25 June 2013
15:00

Argentina	4–0	Italy
Luchetti 30'; Sánchez Moccia 36', 65'; Juárez 58'	Report

Umpires:
Kang Hyun-young (KOR)
Frances Block (ENG)

==== Pool B ====
Pos	Team	Pld	W	D	L	GF	GA	GD	Pts
1	Australia	3	2	1	0	7	1	+6	7
2	England	3	1	2	0	6	3	+3	5
3	Spain	3	0	2	1	3	8	−5	2
4	South Africa	3	0	1	2	3	7	−4	1

Source: FIH
Rules for classification: 1) points; 2) goal difference; 3) goals scored; 4) head-to-head result.

22 June 2013
16:30

Australia	5–0	Spain
Nanscawen 33'; Messent 41'; White 45'; 51'; Hurtz 70'	Report

Umpires:
Michelle Meister (GER)
Wendy Stewart (CAN)

22 June 2013
19:00

England	4–1	South Africa
Gilbert 22'; Owsley 28'; Danson 39'; Ansley 68'	Report	Coetzee 35'

Umpires:
Chieko Soma (JPN)
Melissa Trivic (AUS)

23 June 2013
17:00

Australia	1–1	England
Schulz 60'	Report	Webb 25'

Umpires:
Soledad Iparraguirre (ARG)
Caroline Brunekreef (NED)

23 June 2013
19:30

South Africa	2–2	Spain
Bright 50'; Coetzee 62'	Report	Petchamé 31'; Romagosa 63'

Umpires:
Frances Block (ENG)
Kang Hyun-young (KOR)

25 June 2013
17:30

South Africa	0–1	Australia
	Report	Flanagan 43'

Umpires:
Hannah Sanders (ENG)
Chieko Soma (JPN)

25 June 2013
20:00

England	1–1	Spain
54'	Report	Riera Zuzuarregui 58'

Umpires:
Laurine Delforge (BEL)
Melissa Trivic (AUS)

=== Second round ===
Quarter-finals
27 June 2013
Argentina	3
South Africa	1
27 June 2013
England	3
Italy	2
27 June 2013
China	3
Spain	0
27 June 2013
Australia	4
United States	1

Semi-finals
29 June 2013
Argentina	2
England	4
29 June 2013
China	1
Australia	4

Final
30 June 2013
England	0
Australia	3
Third place
30 June 2013
Argentina	3
China	2

==== Quarter-finals ====
27 June 2013
12:30

Argentina	3–1	South Africa
D'Elía 19', 53'; Luchetti 68'	Report	Coetzee 47'

Umpires:
Michelle Meister (GER)
Melissa Trivic (AUS)

27 June 2013
15:00

Australia	4–1	United States
Smith 7'; White 12'; McMahon 22'; Schulz 25'	Report	Dawson 10'

Umpires:
Laurine Delforge (BEL)
Chieko Soma (JPN)

27 June 2013
17:30

China	3–0	Spain
Liang 43'; Wang 57'; Li H. 65'	Report

Umpires:
Hannah Sanders (ENG)
Caroline Brunekreef (NED)

27 June 2013
20:00

England	3–2	Italy
Danson 3', 25'; Macleod 24'	Report	Ronsisvalli 7'; Di Bernardo 56'

Umpires:
Kang Hyun-young (KOR)
Wendy Stewart (CAN)

==== Fifth to eighth place classification ====
Crossover
29 June 2013
South Africa	1 (1)
Italy (p.s.o)	1 (3)
29 June 2013
Spain	1
United States	3

Fifth place match
30 June 2013
Italy	0
United States	6
Seventh place match
30 June 2013
South Africa	3
Spain	2

===== Crossover =====
29 June 2013
10:00

South Africa	1–1	Italy
Coetzee 69'	Report	Ruggieri 27'
Penalties
Chamberlain (penalty shoot-out missed); Mayne (penalty shoot-out missed); Cox (penalty shoot-out scored); Bright (penalty shoot-out missed)	1–3	(penalty shoot-out scored) Tiddi; (penalty shoot-out missed) Bertarini; (penalty shoot-out scored) Mirabella; (penalty shoot-out scored) Ruggieri

Umpires:
Wendy Stewart (CAN)
Caroline Brunekreef (NED)

29 June 2013
12:30

Spain	1–3	United States
Bonastre 26'	Report	Selenski 25'; Reinprecht 64'; Dawson 67'

Umpires:
Michelle Meister (GER)
Frances Block (ENG)

===== Seventh and eighth place =====
30 June 2013
10:30

South Africa	3–2	Spain
du Plessis 19', 29'; Madsen 33'	Report	Romagosa 8'; Flores Conde 67'

Umpires:
Kang Hyun-young (KOR)
Laurine Delforge (BEL)

===== Fifth and sixth place =====
30 June 2013
13:00

Italy	0–6	United States
	Report	Witmer 11'; Kasold 43'; Selenski 45', 48', 55'; Taylor 65'

Umpires:
Chieko Soma (JPN)
Caroline Brunekreef (NED)

==== First to fourth place classification ====
===== Semifinals =====
29 June 2013
15:00

China	1–4	Australia
Li H. 28'	Report	Nelson 29'; Messent 51'; Parker 58'; Hurtz 63'

Umpires:
Soledad Iparraguirre (ARG)
Hannah Sanders (ENG)

29 June 2013
17:30

Argentina	2–4	England
Rebecchi 26'; 41'	Report	12'; White 32'; Macleod 39'; Townsend 48'

Umpires:
Melissa Trivic (AUS)
Laurine Delforge (BEL)

===== Third and fourth place =====
30 June 2013
15:30

Argentina	3–2	China
Rebecchi 41', 70'; Aymar 61'	Report	Li H. 58'; Liang 65'

Umpires:
Frances Block (ENG)
Wendy Stewart (CAN)

===== Final =====
30 June 2013
18:00

England	0–3	Australia
	Report	Nelson 12'; White 23'; Smith 60'

Umpires:
Soledad Iparraguirre (ARG)
Michelle Meister (GER)

== Final rankings ==
Qualification for 2014 Hockey World Cup

Rank	Rotterdam	London
1	Germany	Australia
2	Netherlands	England
3	South Korea	Argentina
4	New Zealand	China
5	Japan	United States
6	Belgium	Italy
7	India	South Africa
8	Chile	Spain

Host nation
Continental champions
Qualified through 2012–13 FIH Hockey World League

== Goalscorers ==
The following goalscorers list comprises players from both events.

There were 207 goals scored in 48 matches, for an average of 4.31 goals per match.

7 goals

- (China) Li Hongxia

6 goals

- (Netherlands) Maartje Paumen

5 goals

- (Argentina) Carla Rebecchi
- (Netherlands) Kim Lammers
- (New Zealand) Katie Glynn
- (United States) Paige Selenski

4 goals

- (Argentina) Rosario Luchetti
- (Belgium) Erica Coppey
- (Netherlands) Kelly Jonker
- (New Zealand) Krystal Forgesson
- (New Zealand) Charlotte Harrison
- (South Africa) Pietie Coetzee

3 goals

- (Australia) Kellie White
- (China) Wang Mengyu
- (England) Alex Danson
- (Germany) Julia Müller
- (Germany) Maike Stöckel
- (Japan) Mazuki Arai
- (Japan) Rika Komazawa
- (Japan) Shiho Otsuka
- (Japan) Akane Shibata
- (Netherlands) Eva de Goede
- (Netherlands) Ellen Hoog
- (Netherlands) Sabine Mol
- (New Zealand) Kayla Sharland

2 goals

- (Argentina) Silvina D'Elía
- (Argentina) Rocío Sánchez Moccia
- (Australia) Emily Hurtz
- (Australia) Claire Messent
- (Australia) Ashleigh Nelson
- (Australia) Jodie Schulz
- (Australia) Emily Smith
- (China) Liang Meiyu
- (England) Hannah MacLeod
- (Germany) Lydia Haase
- (Germany) Eileen Hoffmann
- (Germany) Marie Mävers
- (Germany) Janne Müller-Wieland
- (India) Vandana Katariya
- (Italy) Macarena Ronsisvalli
- (Japan) Ayaka Nishimura
- (South Africa) Lilian du Plessis
- (South Korea) Han Hye-Lyoung
- (South Korea) Kim Jong-Eun
- (South Korea) Park Mi-Hyun
- (South Korea) Cheon Seul-Ki
- (Spain) María Romagosa
- (United States) Rachel Dawson
- (United States) Michelle Kasold

1 goal

- (Argentina) Luciana Aymar
- (Argentina) Gisele Juárez
- (Australia) Anna Flanagan
- (Australia) Karri McMahon
- (Australia) Georgia Nanscawen
- (Australia) Georgina Parker
- (Belgium) Jill Boon
- (Belgium) Anne-Sophie De Scheemaekere
- (Belgium) Barbara Nelen
- (Belgium) Anouk Raes
- (Belgium) Louise Versavel
- (Chile) Camila Caram
- (Chile) Francisca Vidaurre
- (Chile) Josefa Villalabeitia
- (England) Giselle Ansley
- (England) Susie Gilbert
- (England) Lily Owsley
- (England) Susannah Townsend
- (England) Hollie Webb
- (England) Nicola White
- (Germany) Tina Bachmann
- (Germany) Franzisca Hauke
- (Germany) Hannah Krüger
- (Germany) Jennifer Plass
- (India) Ritushi Kumari Arya
- (India) Anupa Barla
- (India) Chanchan Devi Thockchom
- (Italy) Valentina Braconi
- (Italy) Agustina di Bernardo
- (Italy) Giuliana Ruggieri
- (Italy) Stefania Tosco
- (Japan) Yuri Nagai
- (Japan) Miyuki Nakagawa
- (Japan) Shihori Oikawa
- (Netherlands) Valerie Magis
- (Netherlands) Margot van Geffen
- (Netherlands) Kitty van Male
- (New Zealand) Gemma Flynn
- (New Zealand) Sian Fremaux
- (New Zealand) Anita Punt
- (New Zealand) Petrea Webster
- (South Africa) Tarryn Bright
- (South Africa) Kelly Madsen
- (South Korea) Cheon Eun-Bi
- (South Korea) An Hyo-Ju
- (South Korea) Park Seung-A
- (South Korea) Oh Sun-Soon
- (South Korea) Kim Young-Ran
- (Spain) Berta Bonastre
- (Spain) Anabel Flores Condé
- (Spain) Carlota Petchamé
- (Spain) Lola Riera Zuzuarregui
- (United States) Katie Reinprecht
- (United States) Shannon Taylor
- (United States) Jill Witmer

1 own goal

- Argentina (against England)
- England (against Argentina)
- India (against New Zealand)
- New Zealand (against Japan)

2 own goals

- Belgium (against Chile and Germany)
- Spain (against Australia and England)

Source: Rotterdam London
