= 2014 Women's Four Nations Cup =

International women's field hockey tournament

Tournament details
- Host country: Germany
- City: Bremen
- Teams: 4

Final positions
- Champions: Australia (2nd title)
- Runner-up: Germany
- Third place: England

Tournament statistics
- Matches played: 6
- Goals scored: 26 (4.33 per match)
- Top scorer(s): 4 Players (see list below) (3 goals)

The 2014 Women's Four Nations Cup was the fifth Hockey Four Nations Cup, an international women's field hockey tournament, consisting of a series of test matches. It was held in Germany, from 15 to 18 May 2014, and featured four of the top nations in women's field hockey.

== Competition format ==
The tournament featured the national teams of Australia, England, Japan, and the hosts, Germany, competing in a round-robin format, with each team playing each other once. Three points will be awarded for a win, one for a draw, and none for a loss.

Country	July 2014 FIH Ranking	Best World Cup finish	Best Olympic Games finish
Australia	4	Champions (1994, 1998)	Champions (1988, 1996, 2000)
England	3	Third Place (20101)	Third Place (2012)
Germany	6	Champions (1976, 1981)	Champions (2004)
Japan	9	Fifth place (2006)	Eighth place (2004)

== Results ==
Pos	Team	Pld	W	D	L	GF	GA	GD	Pts	Result
1	Australia	3	2	1	0	13	6	+7	7	Tournament Champion
2	Germany (H)	3	2	1	0	7	4	+3	7	
3	England	3	1	0	2	5	7	−2	3	
4	Japan	3	0	0	3	1	9	−8	0	

Source: FIH
Rules for classification: 1) Points; 2) Goal difference; 3) Goals scored; 4) Games won; 5) Head-to-head.
(H) Hosts

=== Matches ===
15 May 2014
15:00

Australia	4–2	England
Flanagan 40', 63'; Parker 55'; Kenny 70+'	Report	Owsley 4'; Danson 66'

Umpires:
Michelle Meister (GER)
Emi Yamada (JPN)

15 May 2014
17:30

Germany	1–0	Japan
Gablać 24'	Report

Umpires:
Laurine Delforge (BEL)
Rachel Williams (ENG)

17 May 2014
14:00

Australia	6–1	Japan
Parker 3'; Kenny 5', 59'; Smith 13'; Flanagan 17'; Bone 54'	Report	Nishimura 35+'

Umpires:
Michelle Meister (GER)
Rachel Williams (ENG)

17 May 2014
16:30

Germany	3–1	England
Haase 51'; Stöckel 54'; Hillmann 63'	Report	Danson 18'

Umpires:
Laurine Delforge (BEL)
Aleisha Neumann (AUS)

18 May 2014
12:00

England	2–0	Japan
Danson 35+'; Owsley 53'	Report

Umpires:
Michelle Meister (GER)
Aleisha Neumann (AUS)

18 May 2014
14:30

Germany	3–3	Australia
Bachmann 5'; Haase 25'; Hillmann 46'	Report	Smith 14'; Nanscawen 33'; Parker 70+'

Umpires:
Laurine Delforge (BEL)
Emi Yamada (JPN)

== Statistics ==
=== Goalscorers ===
3 Goals

- (Australia) Anna Flanagan
- (Australia) Jodie Kenny
- (Australia) Georgie Parker
- (England) Alex Danson

2 Goals

- (Australia) Emily Smith
- (Germany) Lydia Haase
- (Germany) Kristina Hillmann
- (England) Lily Owsley

1 Goal

- (Australia) Edwina Bone
- (Australia) Georgia Nanscawen
- (Germany) Tina Bachmann
- (Germany) Hannah Gablać
- (Germany) Maike Stöckel
- (Japan) Ayaka Nishimura
