= 2010 Women's Four Nations Cup =

Tournament details
- Host country: Germany
- City: Essen
- Teams: 4

Final positions
- Champions: Australia (1st title)
- Runner-up: Germany
- Third place: India

Tournament statistics
- Matches played: 6
- Goals scored: 30 (5 per match)
- Top scorer: 3 Players (see list below) (4 goals)

The 2010 Women's Four Nations Cup was the second Hockey Four Nations Cup, an international women's field hockey tournament, consisting of a series of test matches. It was held in Germany, from June 25 to 27, 2010, and featured four of the top nations in women's field hockey.

== Competition format ==
The tournament featured the national teams of Argentina, India, Ireland, and the hosts, Germany, competing in a round-robin format, with each team playing each other once. Three points will be awarded for a win, one for a draw, and none for a loss.

Country	October 2011 FIH Ranking	Best World Cup finish	Best Olympic Games finish
Australia	5	Champions (1994, 1999)	Champions (1988, 1996, 2000)
Germany	4	Champions (1976, 1981)	Champions (2004)
India	13	Fourth Place (1974)	Fourth Place (1980)
Ireland	15	Eleventh Place (1994)	N/A

== Officials ==
The following umpires were appointed by the International Hockey Federation to officiate the tournament:

- Stella Bartlema (NED)
- Lynn Cowie-McAlister (AUS)
- Michelle Meister (GER)
- Carol Metchette (IRE)
- Anupama Puchimanda (IND)

== Results ==
All times are local (Central European Time).

Pos	Team	Pld	W	D	L	GF	GA	GD	Pts	Result
1	Australia	3	2	1	0	11	3	+8	7	Tournament Champion
2	Germany (H)	3	1	2	0	7	5	+2	5	
3	India	3	1	1	1	11	9	+2	4	
4	Ireland	3	0	0	3	1	13	−12	0	

Source: Deutscher Hockey-Bund
Rules for classification: 1) Points; 2) Goal difference; 3) Goals scored; 4) Games won; 5) Head-to-head.
(H) Hosts

=== Fixtures ===
25 June 2010
15:00

Australia	4–0	Ireland
Arrold 27', 56', 64'; Nelson 31'	Report

Umpires:
Stella Bartlema (NED)
Michelle Meister (GER)

25 June 2010
17:00

Germany	3–3	India
Haase 12', 51'; Keller 24'	Report	Ralte 38'; Rani R. 64'; Surinder 65'

Umpires:
Carol Metchette (IRE)
Lynn Cowie-McAlister (AUS)

26 June 2010
15:00

India	2–6	Australia
Deepika 18'; Saba 46'	Report	Arrold 7'; Rivers 20', 22', 37', 51'; Blyth 49'

Umpires:
Carol Metchette (IRE)
Michelle Meister (GER)

26 June 2010
17:00

Germany	3–1	Ireland
Geyer 2'; Bachmann 30', 49'	Report	Smyth 16'

Umpires:
Anupama Puchimanda (IND)
Stella Bartlema (NED)

27 June 2010
12:00

India	6–0	Ireland
Surinder 9', 23', 32'; Jasjeet 18', 52'; Deepika 48'	Report

Umpires:
Michelle Meister (GER)
Stella Bartlema (NED)

27 June 2010
14:00

Australia	1–1	Germany
Nelson 70'	Report	Otte 43'

Umpires:
Lynn Cowie-McAlister (AUS)
Anupama Puchimanda (IND)

== Statistics ==
=== Goalscorers ===
There were 30 goals scored in 6 matches, for an average of 5 goals per match.

4 goals

- (Australia) Nicole Arrold
- (Australia) Megan Rivers
- (India) Surinder Kaur

2 goals

- (Australia) Ashleigh Nelson
- (Germany) Tina Bachmann
- (Germany) Lydia Haase
- (India) Jasjeet Kaur Handa
- (India) Deepika Thakur

1 goal

- (Australia) Madonna Blyth
- (Germany) Lina Geyer
- (Germany) Natascha Keller
- (Germany) Katharina Otte
- (India) Saba Anjum
- (India) Rosalin Ralte
- (India) Rani Rampal
- (Ireland) Emma Smyth
