= 2014 Women's Hockey World Cup =

- Official logo

Tournament details
- Host country: Netherlands
- City: The Hague
- Dates: 31 May – 14 June
- Teams: 12
- Venue(s): Kyocera Stadion; GreenFields Stadium

Final positions
- Champions: Netherlands (7th title)
- Runner-up: Australia
- Third place: Argentina

Tournament statistics
- Matches played: 38
- Goals scored: 146 (3.84 per match)
- Top scorer: (Netherlands) Maartje Paumen (7 goals)
- Best player: (Netherlands) Ellen Hoog

Location of the World Cup venue

The 2014 Women's Hockey World Cup was the 13th edition of the Women's Hockey World Cup field hockey tournament. It was held from 31 May to 14 June 2014 at the Kyocera Stadion in The Hague, Netherlands. simultaneously with the men's tournament. It was the third time that the Netherlands hosted the Women's World Cup after 1986 and 1998.

The Netherlands won the tournament for a seventh time after defeating Australia 2–0 in the final. Defending champions Argentina won the third place match by defeating the United States 2–1.

== Bidding ==
The host was announced on 11 November 2010 during the FIH Congress and Forum in Montreux, Switzerland after FIH received bids from The Hague and London.

== Qualification ==
Each of the continental champions from five confederations and the host nation receive an automatic berth. In addition to the six highest placed teams at the Semifinals of the 2012–13 FIH Hockey World League not already qualified, the following twelve teams, shown with final pre-tournament rankings, competed in this tournament.

Dates	Event	Location	Qualifier(s)
11 November 2010	Host nation		Netherlands (1)
13–22 June 2013	2012–13 Hockey World League Semifinals	Rotterdam, Netherlands	South Korea (8); New Zealand (5); Belgium (12)
22–30 June 2013	2012–13 Hockey World League Semifinals	London, England	England (3); China (7); United States (10)
17–24 August 2013	2013 EuroHockey Championship	Boom, Belgium	Germany (6)
21–27 September 2013	2013 Asia Cup	Kuala Lumpur, Malaysia	Japan (9)
21–29 September 2013	2013 Pan American Cup	Mendoza, Argentina	Argentina (2)
30 October–3 November 2013	2013 Oceania Cup	Stratford, New Zealand	Australia (4)
18–23 November 2013	2013 Africa Cup of Nations	Nairobi, Kenya	South Africa (11)

== Umpires ==
17 umpires were appointed by the FIH for this tournament.

- Claire Adenot (FRA)
- Amy Baxter (USA)
- Karen Bennett (NZL)
- Frances Block (ENG)
- Caroline Brunekreef (NED)
- Laurine Delforge (BEL)
- Elena Eskina (RUS)
- Soledad Iparraguirre (ARG)
- Michelle Joubert (RSA)
- Kang Hyun-young (KOR)
- Michelle Meister (GER)
- Miao Lin (CHN)
- Irene Presenqui (ARG)
- Lisa Roach (AUS)
- Chieko Soma (JPN)
- Wendy Stewart (CAN)
- Melissa Trivic (AUS)

== Results ==
All times are Central European Summer Time (UTC+02:00)

=== First round ===
==== Pool A ====
Pos	Team	Pld	W	D	L	GF	GA	GD	Pts	Qualification
1	Netherlands	5	5	0	0	17	1	+16	15	Semifinals
2	Australia	5	3	1	1	9	8	+1	10	Semifinals
3	New Zealand	5	2	1	2	8	7	+1	7	
4	South Korea	5	2	1	2	8	9	−1	7	
5	Japan	5	0	2	3	7	16	−9	2	
6	Belgium	5	0	1	4	9	17	−8	1	

Source: FIH
Rules for classification: 1) points; 2) goal difference; 3) goals scored; 4) head-to-head result.

31 May 2014
13:00

New Zealand	4–3	Belgium
Forgesson 20', 26'; Punt 35'; Whitelock 44'	Report	Nelen 46'; Sinia 49'; De Groof 55'

Kyocera Stadion
Umpires:
Michelle Joubert (RSA)
Miao Lin (CHN)

31 May 2014
14:30

Australia	3–2	South Korea
Hurtz 12'; Flanagan 49', 57'	Report	Cheon Eun-bi 7'; Cheon Seul-ki 63'

GreenFields Stadium
Umpires:
Soledad Iparraguirre (ARG)
Michelle Meister (GER)

31 May 2014
19:45

Netherlands	6–1	Japan
Jonker 7', 21', 42'; Paumen 23', 59'; Hoog 39'	Report	Shibata 65'

Kyocera Stadion
Umpires:
Elena Eskina (RUS)
Amy Hassick (USA)

2 June 2014
10:30

Australia	3–2	Japan
Flanagan 36', 44'; Smith 41'	Report	H. Nagai 20'; Sakai 57'

Kyocera Stadion
Umpires:
Caroline Brunekreef (NED)
Frances Block (ENG)

2 June 2014
14:30

South Korea	1–0	New Zealand
Kim Da-rae 30'	Report

GreenFields Stadium
Umpires:
Irene Presenqui (ARG)
Melissa Trivic (AUS)

2 June 2014
19:45

Netherlands	4–0	Belgium
Hoog 5'; Keetels 30'; Paumen 44'; Drost 49'	Report

Kyocera Stadion
Umpires:
Kang Hyun-young (KOR)
Michelle Joubert (RSA)

5 June 2014
10:30

Belgium	2–3	Australia
De Groof 35'; Boon 42'	Report	Flanagan 16'; Kenny 38', 54'

Kyocera Stadion
Umpires:
Elena Eskina (RUS)
Irene Presenqui (ARG)

5 June 2014
14:30

South Korea	1–1	Japan
Kim Jong-eun 32'	Report	Oikawa 37'

GreenFields Stadium
Umpires:
Melissa Trivic (AUS)
Michelle Meister (GER)

5 June 2014
19:45

New Zealand	0–2	Netherlands
	Report	Dirkse van den Heuvel 5'; Lammers 30'

Kyocera Stadion
Umpires:
Frances Block (ENG)
Chieko Soma (JPN)

7 June 2014
10:30

South Korea	4–2	Belgium
Cheon Eun-bi 12', 61'; Park Mi-hyun 49', 55'	Report	Boon 15'; Gerniers 39'

Kyocera Stadion
Umpires:
Amy Hassick (USA)
Melissa Trivic (AUS)

7 June 2014
17:30

Japan	1–4	New Zealand
Nagai 51'	Report	Cocks 5'; Punt 38', 69'; Glynn 39'

GreenFields Stadium
Umpires:
Laurine Delforge (BEL)
Kang Hyun-young (KOR)

7 June 2014
19:45

Australia	0–2	Netherlands
	Report	Lammers 57' van As 65'

Kyocera Stadion
Umpires:
Michelle Joubert (RSA)
Soledad Iparraguirre (ARG)

9 June 2014
10:30

New Zealand	0–0	Australia
	Report

Kyocera Stadion
Umpires:
Chieko Soma (JPN)
Amy Hassick (USA)

9 June 2014
16:00

Netherlands	3–0	South Korea
van As 3'; Paumen 48', 55'	Report

Kyocera Stadion
Umpires:
Miao Lin (CHN)
Wendy Stewart (CAN)

9 June 2014
17:30

Japan	2–2	Belgium
Nishimura 44'; Shibata 63'	Report	Sinia 37'; Simons 66'

GreenFields Stadium
Umpires:
Michelle Meister (GER)
Claire Adenot (FRA)

==== Pool B ====
Pos	Team	Pld	W	D	L	GF	GA	GD	Pts	Qualification
1	United States	5	4	1	0	17	6	+11	13	Semifinals
2	Argentina	5	3	2	0	12	5	+7	11	Semifinals
3	China	5	2	2	1	9	10	−1	8	
4	Germany	5	1	1	3	6	12	−6	4	
5	South Africa	5	1	0	4	11	16	−5	3	
6	England	5	1	0	4	6	12	−6	3	

Source: FIH
Rules for classification: 1) points; 2) goal difference; 3) goals scored; 4) head-to-head result.

1 June 2014
13:00

England	1–2	United States
Richardson-Walsh 56'	Report	Selenski 3'; Kolojejchick 16'

Kyocera Stadion
Umpires:
Lisa Roach (AUS)
Laurine Delforge (BEL)

1 June 2014
14:30

Germany	1–1	China
Krüger 60'	Report	Peng 61'

GreenFields Stadium
Umpires:
Chieko Soma (JPN)
Wendy Stewart (CAN)

1 June 2014
19:45

Argentina	4–1	South Africa
D'Elía 26', 28'; Barrionuevo 40'; Merino 60'	Report	Bright 60'

Kyocera Stadion
Umpires:
Claire Adenot (FRA)
Karen Bennett (NZL)

3 June 2014
10:30

South Africa	1–3	Germany
Russell 64'	Report	Mävers 19', 65'; Hillmann 50'

Kyocera Stadion
Umpires:
Amy Baxter (USA)
Caroline Brunekreef (NED)

3 June 2014
13:00

England	0–3	China
	Report	Peng 42', 66'; Liang 55'

Kyocera Stadion
Umpires:
Soledad Iparraguirre (ARG)
Laurine Delforge (BEL)

3 June 2014
17:30

Argentina	2–2	United States
D'Elía 32'; Aymar 61'	Report	Reinprecht 28'; Kolojejchick 63'

GreenFields Stadium
Umpires:
Lisa Roach (AUS)
Miao Lin (CHN)

6 June 2014
10:30

China	0–5	United States
	Report	O'Donnell 4', 30'; Vittese 10'; Dawson 63'; Kolojejchick 68'

Kyocera Stadion
Umpires:
Claire Adenot (FRA)
Kang Hyun-young (KOR)

6 June 2014
14:30

South Africa	4–1	England
Taylor 17'; Damons 32'; Russell 40'; Chamberlain 52'	Report	White 55'

GreenFields Stadium
Umpires:
Wendy Stewart (CAN)
Michelle Meister (GER)

6 June 2014
16:00

Germany	0–3	Argentina
	Report	D'Elía 4'; Barrionuevo 32'; Rebecchi 45'

Kyocera Stadion
Umpires:
Karen Bennett (NZL)
Michelle Joubert (RSA)

8 June 2014
14:30

United States	4–1	Germany
Sharkey 33', 52'; Nichols 39'; Reinprecht 43'	Report	Hillmann 60'

GreenFields Stadium
Umpires:
Elena Eskina (RUS)
Lisa Roach (AUS)

8 June 2014
16:00

England	1–2	Argentina
Danson 7'	Report	Merino 27'; Rebecchi 70+'

Kyocera Stadion
Umpires:
Miao Lin (CHN)
Caroline Brunekreef (NED)

8 June 2014
17:30

China	4–3	South Africa
Liang 6'; Wu 15'; Wang N. 54'; Wang M. 68'	Report	Madsen 42'; Chamberlain 62'; Coetzee 65'

GreenFields Stadium
Umpires:
Irene Presenqui (ARG)
Karen Bennett (NZL)

10 June 2014
14:30

United States	4–2	South Africa
Nichols 35'; Reinprecht 39'; Crandall 45'; Dawson 56'	Report	Cox 36'; Chamberlain 47'

GreenFields Stadium
Umpires:
Laurine Delforge (BEL)
Irene Presenqui (ARG)

10 June 2014
16:00

Germany	1–3	England
Krüger 56'	Report	Macleod 44'; Gilbert 49'; Townsend 55'

Kyocera Stadion
Umpires:
Claire Adenot (FRA)
Melissa Trivic (AUS)

10 June 2014
17:30

Argentina	1–1	China
Rebecchi 24'	Report	Peng 58'

GreenFields Stadium
Umpires:
Frances Block (ENG)
Elena Eskina (RUS)

=== Fifth to twelfth place classification ===
==== Eleventh and twelfth place ====
12 June 2014
11:00

Belgium	1–1	England
De Groof 70+'	Report	Bray 16'
Penalties
Gerniers (penalty shoot-out missed); Fobe (penalty shoot-out scored); Vanden Borre (penalty shoot-out missed); De Groof (penalty shoot-out missed) van Lindt (penalty shoot-out missed)	1–2	(penalty shoot-out scored) Walton; (penalty shoot-out missed) White; (penalty shoot-out scored) Gilbert; (penalty shoot-out missed) Danson

Kyocera Stadion
Umpires:
Wendy Stewart (CAN)
Kang Hyun-young (KOR)

==== Ninth and tenth place ====
13 June 2014
10:00

Japan	0–2	South Africa
	Report	Coetzee 59'; Chamberlain 69'

Kyocera Stadion
Umpires:
Karen Bennett (NZL)
Caroline Brunekreef (NED)

==== Seventh and eighth place ====
13 June 2014
12:30

South Korea	4–2	Germany
Kim Ok-ju 13'; Han Hye-lyoung 30'; Kim Jong-eun 48'; Cheon Seul-ki 66'	Report	Bachmann 50'; Müller 53'

Kyocera Stadion
Umpires:
Frances Block (ENG)
Miao Lin (CHN)

==== Fifth and sixth place ====
14 June 2014
10:15

New Zealand	4–0	China
Punt 6', 60'; Whitelock 45'; Forgesson 63'	Report

Kyocera Stadion
Umpires:
Laurine Delforge (BEL)
Irene Presenqui (ARG)

=== First to fourth place classification ===
Semi-finals
12 June 2014
Netherlands	4
Argentina	0
12 June 2014
United States	2 (1)
Australia (p.s.o.)	2 (3)

Final
14 June 2014
Netherlands	2
Australia	0
Third place
14 June 2014
Argentina	2
United States	1

==== Semifinals ====
12 June 2014
16:00

United States	2–2	Australia
Kolojejchick 48', 68'	Report	White 33'; Flanagan 52'
Penalties
O'Donnell (penalty shoot-out missed); Selenski (penalty shoot-out missed); Kolojejchick (penalty shoot-out scored); Kasold (penalty shoot-out missed)	1–3	(penalty shoot-out missed) Blyth; (penalty shoot-out scored) White; (penalty shoot-out scored) Parker; (penalty shoot-out scored) Kenny

Kyocera Stadion
Umpires:
Soledad Iparraguirre (ARG)
Chieko Soma (JPN)

12 June 2014
19:45

Netherlands	4–0	Argentina
de Waard 10'; Paumen 16'; Lammers 22', 70'	Report

Kyocera Stadion
Umpires:
Elena Eskina (RUS)
Lisa Roach (AUS)

==== Third and fourth place ====
14 June 2014
12:30

Argentina	2–1	United States
Aymar 8', 21'	Report	Crandall 27'

Kyocera Stadion
Umpires:
Lisa Roach (AUS)
Chieko Soma (JPN)

==== Final ====
14 June 2014
15:15

Netherlands	2–0	Australia
Paumen 12'; Lammers 29'	Report

Kyocera Stadion
Umpires:
Michelle Joubert (RSA)
Soledad Iparraguirre (ARG)

== Awards ==
Top Goalscorer	Player of the Tournament	Goal of the Tournament	Goalkeeper of the Tournament	Young Player of the Tournament
(Netherlands) Maartje Paumen	(Netherlands) Ellen Hoog	(Netherlands) Kim Lammers	(Australia) Rachael Lynch	(Argentina) Florencia Habif

== Final standings ==
Pos	Grp	Team	Pld	W	D	L	GF	GA	GD	Pts	Final result
1st place, gold medalist(s)	A	Netherlands	7	7	0	0	23	1	+22	21	Gold medal
2nd place, silver medalist(s)	A	Australia	7	3	2	2	11	12	−1	11	Silver medal
3rd place, bronze medalist(s)	B	Argentina	7	4	2	1	14	10	+4	14	Bronze medal
4	B	United States	7	4	2	1	20	10	+10	14	
5	A	New Zealand	6	3	1	2	12	7	+5	10	
6	B	China	6	2	2	2	9	14	−5	8	
7	A	South Korea	6	3	1	2	12	11	+1	10	
8	B	Germany	6	1	1	4	8	16	−8	4	
9	B	South Africa	6	2	0	4	13	16	−3	6	
10	A	Japan	6	0	2	4	7	18	−11	2	
11	B	England	6	1	1	4	7	13	−6	4	
12	A	Belgium	6	0	2	4	10	18	−8	2	

Source: FIH

== Goalscorers ==
There were 146 goals scored in 38 matches, for an average of 3.84 goals per match.

7 goals

- (Netherlands) Maartje Paumen

6 goals

- (Australia) Anna Flanagan

5 goals

- (Netherlands) Kim Lammers
- (New Zealand) Anita Punt
- (United States) Kelsey Kolojejchick

4 goals

- (Argentina) Silvina D'Elía
- (China) Peng Yang
- (South Africa) Dirkie Chamberlain

3 goals

- (Argentina) Luciana Aymar
- (Argentina) Carla Rebecchi
- (Belgium) Stéphanie de Groof
- (Netherlands) Kelly Jonker
- (New Zealand) Krystal Forgesson
- (South Korea) Cheon Eun-bi
- (United States) Katherine Reinprecht

2 goals

- (Argentina) Noel Barrionuevo
- (Argentina) Delfina Merino
- (Australia) Jodie Kenny
- (Belgium) Jill Boon
- (Belgium) Emilie Sinia
- (China) Liang Meiyu
- (Germany) Kristina Hillmann
- (Germany) Hannah Krüger
- (Germany) Marie Mävers
- (Japan) Akane Shibata
- (Netherlands) Naomi van As
- (Netherlands) Ellen Hoog
- (New Zealand) Kayla Whitelock
- (South Africa) Pietie Coetzee
- (South Africa) Shelley Russell
- (South Korea) Cheon Seul-ki
- (South Korea) Kim Jong-eun
- (South Korea) Park Mi-hyun
- (United States) Lauren Crandall
- (United States) Rachel Dawson
- (United States) Caroline Nichols
- (United States) Kathleen O'Donnell
- (United States) Kathleen Sharkey

1 goal

- (Australia) Emily Hurtz
- (Australia) Emily Smith
- (Australia) Kellie White
- (Belgium) Alix Gerniers
- (Belgium) Barbara Nelen
- (Belgium) Manon Simons
- (China) Wang Mengyu
- (China) Wang Na
- (China) Wu Mengrong
- (England) Sophie Bray
- (England) Alexandra Danson
- (England) Susannah Gilbert
- (England) Hannah Macleod
- (England) Kate Richardson-Walsh
- (England) Susannah Townsend
- (England) Nicola White
- (Germany) Tina Bachmann
- (Germany) Julia Müller
- (Japan) Hazuki Nagai
- (Japan) Yuri Nagai
- (Japan) Shihori Oikawa
- (Japan) Ayaka Nishimura
- (Japan) Shiho Sakai
- (Netherlands) Carlien Dirkse van den Heuvel
- (Netherlands) Roos Drost
- (Netherlands) Marloes Keetels
- (Netherlands) Xan de Waard
- (New Zealand) Sophie Cocks
- (New Zealand) Katie Glynn
- (South Africa) Tarryn Bright
- (South Africa) Marsha Cox
- (South Africa) Sulette Damons
- (South Africa) Kelly Madsen
- (South Africa) Kathleen Taylor
- (South Korea) Han Hye-lyoung
- (South Korea) Kim Da-rae
- (South Korea) Kim Ok-ju
- (United States) Paige Selenski
- (United States) Michelle Vittese

Source: FIH
