= 2012 Women's Four Nations Cup =

Tournament details
- Host country: Germany
- City: Bremen
- Teams: 4

Final positions
- Champions: Germany (2nd title)
- Runner-up: New Zealand
- Third place: South Africa

Tournament statistics
- Matches played: 6
- Goals scored: 25 (4.17 per match)
- Top scorer(s): (South Africa) Pietie Coetzee (4 goals)

The 2012 Women's Four Nations Cup was the fourth Hockey Four Nations Cup, an international women's field hockey tournament, consisting of a series of test matches. It was held in Germany, from July 12 to 15, 2012, and featured four of the top nations in women's field hockey.

== Competition format ==
The tournament featured the national teams of Belgium, New Zealand, South Africa, and the hosts, Germany, competing in a round-robin format, with each team playing each other once. Three points will be awarded for a win, one for a draw, and none for a loss.

Country	October 2011 FIH Ranking	Best World Cup finish	Best Olympic Games finish
Belgium	16	Third Place (1978)	N/A
Germany	3	Champions (1976, 1981)	Champions (2004)
New Zealand	6	Fourth Place (1986)	Sixth Place (1984, 2000, 2004)
South Africa	12	Seventh place (1998)	Ninth place (2004)

== Officials ==
The following umpires were appointed by the International Hockey Federation to officiate the tournament:

- Laurine Delforge (BEL)
- Elena Eskina (RUS)
- Michelle Meister (GER)
- Melanie Oakden (NZL)
- Annelize Rostron (RSA)

== Results ==
All times are local (Central European Time).

Pos	Team	Pld	W	D	L	GF	GA	GD	Pts	Result
1	Germany (H)	3	2	0	1	10	3	+7	6	Tournament Champion
2	New Zealand	3	2	0	1	6	7	−1	6	
3	South Africa	3	1	0	2	5	7	−2	3	
4	Belgium	3	1	0	2	4	8	−4	3	

Source: Deutscher Hockey-Bund
Rules for classification: 1) Points; 2) Goal difference; 3) Goals scored; 4) Games won; 5) Head-to-head.
(H) Hosts

=== Fixtures ===
12 July 2012
16:15

New Zealand	4–2	Belgium
C. Harrison 15'; Glynn 19'; Michelsen 29'; S. Harrison 37'	Report	De Groof 28'; Boon 64'

Umpires:
Elena Eskina (RUS)
Melanie Oakden (NZL)

12 July 2012
18:45

Germany	5–1	South Africa
Keller 6', 7'; Otte 29'; Hahn 48'; Rinne 63'	Report	Coetzee 70'

Umpires:
Laurine Delforge (BEL)
Michelle Meister (GER)

14 July 2012
13:30

Germany	0–1	Belgium
	Report	Coppey 69'

Umpires:
Annelize Rostron (RSA)
Elena Eskina (RUS)

14 July 2012
16:00

South Africa	0–1	New Zealand
	Report	S. Harrison 19'

Umpires:
Michelle Meister (GER)
Laurine Delforge (BEL)

15 July 2012
12:00

South Africa	4–1	Belgium
Coetzee 2', 12', 28'; Wilson 5'	Report	Sinia 27'

Umpires:
Melanie Oakden (NZL)
Elena Eskina (RUS)

15 July 2012
14:30

New Zealand	1–5	Germany
C. Harrison 45'	Report	Mävers 10'; Otte 22'; Rinne 43'; Keller 57'; Hahn 61'

Umpires:
Laurine Delforge (RSA)
Annelize Rostron (RSA)

== Statistics ==
=== Goalscorers ===
There were 25 goals scored in 6 matches, for an average of 4.17 goals per match.

4 goals

- (South Africa) Pietie Coetzee

3 goals

- (Germany) Natascha Keller

2 goals

- (Germany) Lisa Hahn
- (Germany) Katharina Otte
- (Germany) Fanny Rinne
- (New Zealand) Charlotte Harrison
- (New Zealand) Samantha Harrison

1 goal

- (Belgium) Jill Boon
- (Belgium) Erica Coppey
- (Belgium) Stéphanie de Groof
- (Belgium) Emilie Sinia
- (Germany) Marie Mävers
- (New Zealand) Katie Glynn
- (New Zealand) Stacey Michelsen
- (South Africa) Jennifer Wilson
