= 2016 Women's Four Nations Cup =

Tournament details
- Host country: Germany
- City: Hamburg
- Teams: 4

Final positions
- Champions: Argentina (2nd title)
- Runner-up: Germany
- Third place: China

Tournament statistics
- Matches played: 6
- Goals scored: 14 (2.33 per match)
- Top scorer(s): (Argentina) Carla Rebecchi (2 goals)

The 2016 Women's Four Nations Cup was the sixth Hockey Four Nations Cup, an international women's field hockey tournament, consisting of a series of test matches. It was held in Germany, from June 9 to 12, 2016, and featured four of the top nations in women's field hockey.

== Competition format ==
The tournament featured the national teams of Argentina, China, South Korea, and the hosts, Germany, competing in a round-robin format, with each team playing each other once. Three points were awarded for a win, one for a draw, and none for a loss.

Country	June 2016 FIH Ranking	Best World Cup finish	Best Olympic Games finish
Argentina	2	Champions (2002, 2010)	Runners-Up (2000, 2012)
China	6	Third Place (2002)	Runners-Up (2008)
South Korea	8	Third Place (1990)	Runners-Up (1988, 1996)
Germany	9	Champions (1976, 1981)	Champions (2004)

== Results ==
Pos	Team	Pld	W	D	L	GF	GA	GD	Pts	Result
1	Argentina	3	3	0	0	6	1	+5	9	Tournament Champion
2	Germany (H)	3	2	0	1	5	3	+2	6	
3	China	3	1	0	2	2	5	−3	3	
4	South Korea	3	0	0	3	1	5	−4	0	

Source: FIH
Rules for classification: 1) Points; 2) Goal difference; 3) Goals scored; 4) Games won; 5) Head-to-head.
(H) Hosts

=== Matches ===
9 June 2016
16:30

Argentina	3–1	China
Merino 3'; Barrionuevo 37'; Rebecchi 37'	Report	Zhang J. 23'

Umpires:
Amy Baxter (USA)
Kang Hyun-young (KOR)

9 June 2016
19:00

South Korea	1–3	Germany
Jang Hee-sun 11'	Report	Müller 2'; Schütze 58'; Mävers 60'

Umpires:
Wang Yanli (CHN)
Soledad Iparraguirre (ENG)

11 June 2016
13:00

South Korea	0–1	Argentina
	Report	Rebecchi 8'

Umpires:
Michelle Meister (GER)
Wang Yanli (CHN)

11 June 2016
15:30

China	0–2	Germany
	Report	Stapenhorst 52'; Lorenz 56'

Umpires:
Soledad Iparraguirre (ARG)
Amy Baxter (USA)

12 June 2016
11:00

China	1–0	South Korea
Sun 13'	Report

Umpires:
Michelle Meister (GER)
Soledad Iparraguirre (ARG)

12 June 2016
13:30

Argentina	2–0	Germany
Granatto 2'; Aguirre 5'	Report

Umpires:
Amy Baxter (USA)
Kang Hyun-young (KOR)

== Statistics ==
=== Goalscorers ===
2 Goals

- (Argentina) Carla Rebecchi

1 Goal

- (Argentina) Gabriela Aguirre
- (Argentina) Noel Barrionuevo
- (Argentina) María José Granatto
- (Argentina) Delfina Merino
- (China) Zhang Jinrong
- (China) Sun Xiao
- (Germany) Charlotte Stapenhorst
- (Germany) Nike Lorenz
- (Germany) Marie Mävers
- (Germany) Julia Müller
- (Germany) Lisa Schütze
- (South Korea) Jang Hee-sun
