= 2008 Women's Four Nations Cup =

Tournament details
- Host country: Germany
- City: Bremen
- Teams: 4

Final positions
- Champions: Germany (1st title)
- Runner-up: South Korea
- Third place: United States

Tournament statistics
- Matches played: 6
- Goals scored: 43 (7.17 per match)
- Top scorer(s): (South Korea) Lee Seon-Ok (5 goals)

The 2008 Women's Four Nations Cup was the inaugural Hockey Four Nations Cup, an international women's field hockey tournament, consisting of a series of test matches. It was held in Germany, from July 4 to 6, 2018, and featured four of the top nations in women's field hockey.

== Competition format ==
The tournament featured the national teams of India, South Korea, the United States, and the hosts, Germany, competing in a round-robin format, with each team playing each other once. Three points were awarded for a win, one for a draw, and none for a loss.

Country	2008 FIH Ranking	Best World Cup finish	Best Olympic Games finish
Germany	3	Champions (1976, 1981)	Champions (2004)
India	14	Third Place (1974)	Fourth Place (1980)
South Korea	10	Third Place (1990)	Runners-Up (1988, 1996)
United States	9	Third Place (1994)	Third Place (1984)

== Officials ==
The following umpires were appointed by the International Hockey Federation to officiate the tournament:

- Amy Hassick (USA)
- Kang Hyun-Young (KOR)
- Anne McRae (SCO)
- Petra Müller (GER)
- Anupama Puchimanda (IND)

== Results ==
All times are local (Central European Summer Time).

=== Pool ===
Pos	Team	Pld	W	D	L	GF	GA	GD	Pts	Result
1	Germany (H)	3	2	1	0	16	6	+10	7	Tournament Champion
2	South Korea	3	2	1	0	16	7	+9	7	
3	United States	3	0	1	2	6	13	−7	1	
4	India	3	0	1	2	5	17	−12	1	

Source: Deutscher Hockey-Bund
Rules for classification: 1) Points; 2) Goal difference; 3) Goals scored; 4) Games won; 5) Head-to-head.
(H) Hosts

==== Fixtures ====
4 July 2008
15:00

United States	3–5	South Korea
K. Smith 11'; Snow 40', 45'	Report	Lee S. 5', 57'; Kim Y. 22'; Gim 53'; Park M. 59'

Umpires:
Petra Müller (GER)
Anupama Puchimanda (IND)

4 July 2008
17:00

Germany	7–2	India
Stöckel 17', 40'; Kühn 32'; Beermann 47'; Scholz 58'; Hoffmann 62'; Keller 63'	Report	Rani 46'; Chanchan 48'

Umpires:
Anne McRae (SCO)
Amy Hassick (USA)

5 July 2008
15:00

South Korea	2–2	Germany
Kim M. 42'; Gim 63'	Report	Stöckel 26'; Bachmann 31'

Umpires:
Anne McRae (SCO)
Anupama Puchimanda (IND)

5 July 2008
17:00

United States	1–1	India
Doton 32'	Report	Kaur 4'

Umpires:
Kang Hyun-Young (KOR)
Petra Müller (GER)

6 July 2008
12:00

South Korea	9–2	India
Lee S. 18', 28', 43'; Park J. 19'; Eum 41'; Kim M. 48'; Kim D. 58'; Gim 60', 70'	Report	Rani 21'; Subhadra 63'

Umpires:
Amy Hassick (USA)
Petra Müller (GER)

6 July 2008
14:00

Germany	7–2	United States
Kühn 1'; Rinne 10'; Hoffmann 26', 60'; Keller 31', 69'; Beermann 62'	Report	Lingo 50'; Snow 63'

Umpires:
Anne McRae (SCO)
Kang Hyun-Young (KOR)

== Statistics ==
=== Goalscorers ===
There were 43 goals scored in 6 matches, for an average of 7.17 goals per match.

5 goals

- (South Korea) Lee Seon-Ok

4 goals

- (South Korea) Gim Sung-Hee

3 goals

- (Germany) Eileen Hoffmann
- (Germany) Natascha Keller
- (Germany) Maike Stöckel
- (United States) Tiffany Snow

2 goals

- (Germany) Janine Beermann
- (Germany) Anke Kühn
- (India) Rani Rampal
- (South Korea) Kim Mi-Seon

1 goal

- (Germany) Tina Bachmann
- (Germany) Fanny Rinne
- (Germany) Katharina Scholz
- (India) Surinder Kaur
- (India) Subhadra Pradhan
- (India) Chanchan Thokchom
- (South Korea) Kim Da-Rae
- (South Korea) Park Jeong-Sook
- (South Korea) Park Mi-Hyun
- (South Korea) Eum Mi-young
- (South Korea) Kim Young-Ran
- (United States) Kelly Doton
- (United States) Carrie Lingo
- (United States) Keli Smith
