= 2011 Women's Four Nations Cup =

Tournament details
- Host country: Germany
- City: Berlin
- Teams: 4

Final positions
- Champions: Argentina (1st title)
- Runner-up: Germany
- Third place: Australia

Tournament statistics
- Matches played: 6
- Goals scored: 21 (3.5 per match)
- Top scorer(s): (Germany) Natascha Keller (3 goals)

The 2011 Women's Four Nations Cup was the third Hockey Four Nations Cup, an international women's field hockey tournament, consisting of a series of test matches. It was held in Germany, from July 12 to 15, 2012, and featured four of the top nations in women's field hockey.

== Competition format ==
The tournament featured the national teams of Argentina, Australia, South Korea, and the hosts, Germany, competing in a round-robin format, with each team playing each other once. Three points will be awarded for a win, one for a draw, and none for a loss.

Country	October 2011 FIH Ranking	Best World Cup finish	Best Olympic Games finish
Argentina	2	Champions (2002, 2010)	Runners-Up (2000)
Australia	7	Champions (1994, 1998)	Champions (1988, 1996, 2000)
Germany	3	Champions (1976, 1981)	Champions (2004)
South Korea	8	Third place (1990)	Runners-Up (1988, 1996)

== Officials ==
The following umpires were appointed by the International Hockey Federation to officiate the tournament:

- Kim Jung-Hee (KOR)
- Michelle Meister (GER)
- Victoria del Olmo (ESP)
- Maricel Sánchez (ARG)
- Kylie Seymour (AUS)

== Results ==
All times are local (Central European Time).

Pos	Team	Pld	W	D	L	GF	GA	GD	Pts	Result
1	Argentina	3	2	1	0	6	3	+3	7	Tournament Champion
2	Germany (H)	3	1	1	1	6	5	+1	4	
3	Australia	3	1	1	1	5	7	−2	4	
4	South Korea	3	0	1	2	4	6	−2	1	

Source: Deutscher Hockey-Bund
Rules for classification: 1) Points; 2) Goal difference; 3) Goals scored; 4) Games won; 5) Head-to-head.
(H) Hosts

=== Fixtures ===
16 June 2011
16:30

Argentina	3–3	Australia
García 50'; Sánchez Moccia 65'; Barrionuevo 70+'	Report	Trost 23'; Parker 35'; Nelson 64'

Umpires:
Kim Jung-Hee (KOR)
Michelle Meister (GER)

16 June 2011
18:45

Germany	3–3	South Korea
Keller 8'; Bachmann 36', 42'	Report	Kim Jong-H. 11'; Cho 14'; Kim Jong-E. 19'

Umpires:
Victoria del Olmo (ESP)
Kylie Seymour (AUS)

18 June 2011
14:00

Australia	0–3	Germany
	Report	Keller 39', 67'; Rinne 64'

Umpires:
Maricel Sánchez (ARG)
Victoria del Olmo (ESP)

18 June 2011
16:00

Argentina	1–0	South Korea
Luchetti 56'	Report

Umpires:
Michelle Meister (GER)
Kylie Seymour (AUS)

19 June 2011
12:00

Australia	2–1	South Korea
Hurtz 7'; Rivers 56'	Report	Kim D. 40'

Umpires:
Victoria del Olmo (ESP)
Maricel Sánchez (ARG)

19 June 2011
14:30

Germany	0–2	Argentina
	Report	Rebecchi 52'; Merino 61'

Umpires:
Kylie Seymour (AUS)
Kim Jung-Hee (KOR)

== Statistics ==
=== Goalscorers ===
There were 21 goals scored in 6 matches, for an average of 3.5 goals per match.

3 goals

- (Germany) Natascha Keller

2 goals

- (Germany) Tina Bachmann

1 goal

- (Argentina) Noel Barrionuevo
- (Argentina) Soledad García
- (Argentina) Rosario Luchetti
- (Argentina) Delfina Merino
- (Argentina) Carla Rebecchi
- (Argentina) Rocío Sánchez Moccia
- (Australia) Emily Hurtz
- (Australia) Ashleigh Nelson
- (Australia) Georgina Parker
- (Australia) Megan Rivers
- (Australia) Renee Trost
- (Germany) Fanny Rinne
- (South Korea) Kim Da-Rae
- (South Korea) Cho Eun-Ji
- (South Korea) Kim Jong-Eun
- (South Korea) Kim Jong-Hee
