= 2012–13 Women's FIH Hockey World League Final =

Field hockey tournament

Tournament details
- Host country: Argentina
- City: San Miguel de Tucumán
- Teams: 8
- Venue: Club Natación y Gimnasia

Final positions
- Champions: Netherlands (1st title)
- Runner-up: Australia
- Third place: England

Tournament statistics
- Matches played: 24
- Goals scored: 97 (4.04 per match)
- Top scorer: (Netherlands) Maartje Paumen (6 goals)
- Best player: (Netherlands) Lidewij Welten

The 2012–13 Women's FIH Hockey World League Final was the 1st edition of the Finals of the FIH Hockey World League for women. It was held from 30 November to 8 December 2013 in San Miguel de Tucumán, Argentina.

The Netherlands won the tournament for the first time after defeating Australia 5–1 in the finals. England won the third place match by defeating host nation Argentina 4–2 on a penalty shootout after a 1–1 draw.

== Qualification ==
The host nation qualified automatically in addition to 7 teams qualified from the Semifinals. The following eight teams, shown with final pre-tournament rankings, competed in this round of the tournament. These were not the rankings used to allocate teams to the pools as they were announced five days before the tournament started, but the previous update released on 30 June 2013, after the completion of the Semifinals.

Dates	Event	Location	Quotas	Qualifier(s)
	Host nation		1	Argentina (1)
13–22 June 2013	2012–13 FIH Hockey World League Semifinals	Rotterdam, Netherlands	4	Germany (6); Netherlands (2); South Korea (8); New Zealand (4)
22–30 June 2013	2012–13 FIH Hockey World League Semifinals	London, England	3	Australia (5); England (3); China (7)
Total			8	

== Umpires ==
Below are the 10 umpires appointed by the International Hockey Federation:

- Fanneke Alkemade (NED)
- Frances Block (ENG)
- Amy Hassick (USA)
- Kelly Hudson (NZL)
- Soledad Iparraguirre (ARG)
- Kang Hyun-young (KOR)
- Mariana Reydo (ARG)
- Lisa Roach (AUS)
- Annelize Rostron (RSA)
- Dino Willox (WAL)

== Results ==
All times are Argentina Time (UTC−03:00)

=== First round ===
==== Pool A ====
Pos	Team	Pld	W	D	L	GF	GA	GD	Pts
1	Netherlands	3	3	0	0	12	3	+9	9
2	England	3	2	0	1	11	6	+5	6
3	South Korea	3	0	1	2	5	11	−6	1
4	Germany	3	0	1	2	3	11	−8	1

Source: FIH
Rules for classification: 1) points; 2) goal difference; 3) goals scored; 4) head-to-head result.

30 November 2013
09:00

England	6–2	South Korea
Danson 32'; Owsley 39', 50'; Twigg 45'; K. Richardson-Walsh 63', 70'	Report	Park K. 17'; Park S. 20'

Umpires:
Mariana Reydo (ARG)
Amy Hassick (USA)

30 November 2013
11:30

Netherlands	6–0	Germany
Paumen 22'; Welten 39'; Verschoor 43'; Derkx 57'; Pheninckx 59'; Hoog 66'	Report

Umpires:
Dino Willox (WAL)
Lisa Roach (AUS)

1 December 2013
09:00

England	2–3	Netherlands
Twigg 33'; 41'	Report	Paumen 6', 67' van Male 68'

Umpires:
Kelly Hudson (NZL)
Soledad Iparraguirre (ARG)

1 December 2013
11:30

Germany	2–2	South Korea
Hoffmann 12'; 39'	Report	Park M. 23', 60'

Umpires:
Frances Block (ENG)
Annelize Rostron (RSA)

3 December 2013
09:00

Netherlands	3–1	South Korea
Welten 2', 16'; Van Male 5'	Report	Cheon E. 63'

Umpires:
Annelize Rostron (RSA)
Amy Hassick (USA)

3 December 2013
11:30

Germany	1–3	England
Hoffmann 17'	Report	Danson 17', 70'; Bray 41'

Umpires:
Mariana Reydo (ARG)
Kang Hyun-Young (KOR)

==== Pool B ====
Pos	Team	Pld	W	D	L	GF	GA	GD	Pts
1	Australia	3	2	1	0	11	3	+8	7
2	Argentina	3	2	1	0	6	3	+3	7
3	China	3	1	0	2	4	8	−4	3
4	New Zealand	3	0	0	3	2	9	−7	0

Source: FIH
Rules for classification: 1) points; 2) goal difference; 3) goals scored; 4) head-to-head result.

30 November 2013
18:30

New Zealand	0–2	China
	Report	Cui 7'; Huang 61'

Umpires:
Soledad Iparraguirre (ARG)
Fanneke Alkemade (NED)

30 November 2013
21:00

Argentina	1–1	Australia
Merino 14'	Report	31'

Umpires:
Kang Hyun-Young (KOR)
Frances Block (ENG)

1 December 2013
18:30

Australia	5–1	China
Messent 15'; White 18'; Smith 36', 50'; Schulz 70'	Report	Wang M. 31'

Umpires:
Fanneke Alkemade (NED)
Mariana Reydo (ARG)

1 December 2013
21:00

New Zealand	1–2	Argentina
Punt 21'	Report	Merino 24', 40'

Umpires:
Lisa Roach (AUS)
Amy Hassick (USA)

3 December 2013
18:30

Australia	5–1	New Zealand
Parker 11'; Nelson 22'; White 42', 66'; Schulz 54'	Report	Webster 13'

Umpires:
Dino Willox (WAL)
Soledad Iparraguirre (ARG)

3 December 2013
21:00

Argentina	3–1	China
Albertario 17'; Luchetti 29'; Merino 38'	Report	Wu M. 13'

Umpires:
Kelly Hudson (NZL)
Lisa Roach (AUS)

=== Second round ===
Quarter-finals
5 December 2013
Netherlands	1
New Zealand	0
5 December 2013
Argentina	3
South Korea	1
5 December 2013
England	1
China	0
5 December 2013
Australia (p.s.o)	1 (4)
Germany	1 (2)

Semi-finals
7 December 2013
Netherlands (p.s.o)	2 (3)
Argentina	2 (2)
7 December 2013
England	0
Australia	3

Final
8 December 2013
Netherlands	5
Australia	1
Third place
8 December 2013
Argentina	1 (2)
England (p.s.o)	1 (4)

==== Quarterfinals ====
5 December 2013
09:00

Netherlands	1–0	New Zealand
Welten 41'	Report

Umpires:
Mariana Reydo (ARG)
Frances Block (ENG)

5 December 2013
11:30

Australia	1–1	Germany
Nelson 48'	Report	Hoffmann 11'
Penalties
Blyth (penalty shoot-out scored); White (penalty shoot-out scored); Parker (penalty shoot-out scored); Messent (penalty shoot-out scored)	4–2	(penalty shoot-out missed) Müller; (penalty shoot-out scored) Mävers; (penalty shoot-out scored) Teschke; (penalty shoot-out missed) Stöckel

Umpires:
Amy Hassick (USA)
Fanneke Alkemade (NED)

5 December 2013
18:30

England	1–0	China
Twigg 46'	Report

Umpires:
Annelize Rostron (RSA)
Kang Hyun-Young (KOR)

5 December 2013
21:00

Argentina	3–1	South Korea
Rebecchi 51', 69'; Barrionuevo 58'	Report	Park Mi-hyun 46'

Umpires:
Kelly Hudson (NZL)
Dino Willox (WAL)

==== Fifth to eighth place classification ====
Crossover
7 December 2013
New Zealand	3
South Korea	1
7 December 2013
China	3
Germany	1

Fifth place match
8 December 2013
New Zealand	1
China	0
Seventh place match
8 December 2013
South Korea	4
Germany	7

===== Crossover =====
7 December 2013
09:00

New Zealand	3–1	South Korea
Sharland 7'; Webster 17'; Flynn 37'	Report	Han 59'

Umpires:
Annelize Rostron (RSA)
Fanneke Alkemade (NED)

7 December 2013
11:30

China	3–1	Germany
Peng 12'; Huang 18'; Liang 57'	Report	Hoffmann 64'

Umpires:
Kang Hyun-Young (KOR)
Dino Willox (WAL)

===== Seventh and eighth place =====
8 December 2013
09:00

South Korea	4–7	Germany
Cheon S. 26', 51'; Park S. 48'; An 56'	Report	Hoffmann 23'; Krüger 41', 55'; Stapenhorst 43'; Mävers 58', 59'; Müller 68'

Umpires:
Fanneke Alkemade (NED)
Mariana Reydo (ARG)

===== Fifth and sixth place =====
8 December 2013
11:30

New Zealand	1–0	China
Sharland 56'	Report

Umpires:
Kang Hyun-Young (KOR)
Frances Block (ENG)

==== First to fourth place classification ====
===== Semifinals =====
7 December 2013
18:30

England	0–3	Australia
	Report	Schulz 32'; Parker 37'; McMahon 41'

Umpires:
Soledad Iparraguirre (ARG)
Kelly Hudson (NZL)

7 December 2013
21:00

Netherlands	2–2	Argentina
Paumen 2'; Drost 56'	Report	Cavallero 12'; Luchetti 48'
Penalties
Bos (penalty shoot-out scored); Drost (penalty shoot-out scored); Paumen (penalty shoot-out scored); Welten (penalty shoot-out missed)	3–2	(penalty shoot-out missed) Rebecchi; (penalty shoot-out scored) Merino; (penalty shoot-out missed) Scarone; (penalty shoot-out scored) Gomes Fantasia; (penalty shoot-out missed) Aymar

Umpires:
Lisa Roach (AUS)
Frances Block (ENG)

===== Third and fourth place =====
8 December 2013
18:30

England	1–1	Argentina
Unsworth 4'	Report	32'
Penalties
H. Richardson-Walsh (penalty shoot-out scored); Danson (penalty shoot-out scored); Gilbert (penalty shoot-out scored); K. Richardson-Walsh (penalty shoot-out missed); Walton (penalty shoot-out scored)	4–2	(penalty shoot-out scored) Rebecchi; (penalty shoot-out missed) Merino; (penalty shoot-out scored) Scarone; (penalty shoot-out missed) Gomes Fantasia

Umpires:
Amy Hassick (USA)
Lisa Roach (AUS)

===== Final =====
8 December 2013
21:00

Australia	1–5	Netherlands
Flanagan 6'	Report	Paumen 43', 64'; Drost 43' van Male 52'; Welten 67'

Umpires:
Soledad Iparraguirre (ARG)
Kelly Hudson (NZL)

== Awards ==
Top Goalscorer	Player of the Tournament	Goalkeeper of the Tournament
(Netherlands) Maartje Paumen	(Netherlands) Lidewij Welten	(England) Maddie Hinch

== Statistics ==
=== Final ranking ===
As per statistical convention in field hockey, matches decided in extra time are counted as wins and losses, while matches decided by penalty shoot-outs are counted as draws.

Pos	Team	Pld	W	D	L	GF	GA	GD	Pts	Final result
1st place, gold medalist(s)	Netherlands	6	5	1	0	20	6	+14	16	Gold Medal
2nd place, silver medalist(s)	Australia	6	3	2	1	16	9	+7	11	Silver Medal
3rd place, bronze medalist(s)	England	6	3	1	2	13	10	+3	10	Bronze Medal
4	Argentina	6	3	3	0	12	7	+5	12	Fourth place
5	New Zealand	6	2	0	4	6	11	−5	6	Fifth place
6	China	6	2	0	4	7	11	−4	6	Sixth place
7	Germany	6	1	2	3	12	19	−7	5	Seventh place
8	South Korea	6	0	1	5	11	24	−13	1	Eighth place

Source: FIH

=== Goalscorers ===
There were 97 goals scored in 24 matches, for an average of 4.04 goals per match.

6 goals

- (Netherlands) Maartje Paumen

5 goals

- (Germany) Eileen Hoffmann
- (Netherlands) Lidewij Welten

4 goals

- (Argentina) Delfina Merino

3 goals

- (Australia) Jodie Schulz
- (Australia) Kellie White
- (England) Alex Danson
- (England) Georgie Twigg
- (South Korea) Park Mi-hyun
- (Netherlands) Kitty van Male

2 goals

- (Argentina) Rosario Luchetti
- (Argentina) Carla Rebecchi
- (Australia) Ashleigh Nelson
- (Australia) Georgina Parker
- (Australia) Emily Smith
- (China) Huang Ting
- (England) Lily Owsley
- (England) Kate Richardson-Walsh
- (Germany) Hannah Krüger
- (Germany) Marie Mävers
- (South Korea) Cheon Seul-ki
- (South Korea) Park Seung-a
- (Netherlands) Roos Drost
- (New Zealand) Kayla Sharland
- (New Zealand) Petrea Webster

1 goal

- (Argentina) Agustina Albertario
- (Argentina) Noel Barrionuevo
- (Argentina) Martina Cavallero
- (Australia) Anna Flanagan
- (Australia) Karri McMahon
- (Australia) Claire Messent
- (China) Cui Qiuxia
- (China) Liang Meiyu
- (China) Peng Yang
- (China) Wang Mengyu
- (China) Wu Mengrong
- (England) Sophie Bray
- (England) Laura Unsworth
- (Germany) Charlotte Stapenhorst
- (Germany) Julia Müller
- (South Korea) An Hyo-ju
- (South Korea) Cheon Eun-bi
- (South Korea) Han Hye-lyoung
- (South Korea) Park Ki-ju
- (Netherlands) Frederique Derkx
- (Netherlands) Ellen Hoog
- (Netherlands) Malou Pheninckx
- (Netherlands) Maria Verschoor
- (New Zealand) Gemma Flynn
- (New Zealand) Anita Punt

1 own goal

- Argentina (against Australia)
- England (against Argentina)
- Netherlands (against England)
- South Korea (against Germany)
