= Frederique Derkx =

Dutch field hockey player

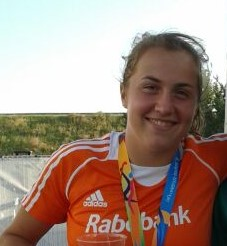
- Derkx after the World Cup in 2014 in The Hague
- Born: 20 February 1994 (age 32)
- Known for: Field hockey player

Frederique Derkx
Medal record

Women's field hockey

Representing Netherlands

World Cup
Gold medal – first place	2014 The Hague	Team

Champions Trophy
Bronze medal – third place	2014 Mendoza	Team

Frederique Derkx (born 20 February 1994, Heeze) is a Dutch field hockey player.

== Life ==
Derkx started her hockey career at Hockey Heeze. She later played for HC Den Bosch, where she won two national championships, before moving to Oranje Zwart in 2012. In 2015 she moved to SCHC, where she still plays.

Derkx was a member of the junior Netherlands women's national field hockey team that won the field hockey tournament at the 2010 Summer Youth Olympics.

She was a member of the Netherlands team that won the 2014 Women's Hockey World Cup.

In 2016 Derkx did not make the final squad for the Olympics. Following this, she announced her retirement from the Dutch national team, having suffered the second hernia in her career. She played a total of 56 caps for the Dutch national squad.

In February 2018 Derkx was surprised to find that she had returned to fitness. She had stopped playing and had been concentrating on her job of coaching at a specialist sports school in Eindhoven. However, in August 2017 she had undergone surgery on her back. She gave up playing and in December 2018 she had started training. Her specialists believe that she has a few years left at the top level.

Derkx' sister, Charlotte Derkx, played hockey for Oranje Zwart in the top Dutch league, and for KHC Dragons in Belgium. Their cousin, Valerie Magis, plays for HC Oranje-Rood and has also played for the national squad.
