= Valerie Magis =

Dutch field hockey player (born 1992)

Personal information
- Full name: Valerie Maria Henriette Magis
- Born: 19 March 1992 (age 34) Heeze, Netherlands
- Height: 1.79 m (5 ft 10 in)

Sport
- Sport: Field hockey
- Position: Defender
- Club: Dragons
Youth career
- Team
- –: Oranje Zwart
Senior career
Years	Team	Caps	Goals
–2016	Oranje Zwart	-	-
2016–2019	Oranje-Rood	-	-
2019–	Dragons	-	-
National team
Years	Team	Caps	Goals
2011–2017	Netherlands	35	(4)
Medal record
Women's field hockey
Representing Netherlands
Champions Trophy
Bronze medal – third place	2014 Mendoza
EuroHockey Championship
Silver medal – second place	2015 London
Bronze medal – third place	2013 Boom

Valerie Maria Henriette Magis (born 29 March 1992) is a Dutch field hockey player who plays as a defender for Belgian club Dragons.

== Career ==
=== Club ===
Valerie Magis played her club hockey for HC Oranje-Rood in the Dutch Hoofdklasse, the top national league until 2019. In 2019 she left the Netherlands to play for Dragons in Belgium.

=== National team ===
Magis made her international debut in 2011, in a test match against South Africa.

Following her debut, Magis was left out of the team in 2012, and returned in 2013 at the 2012–13 Hockey World League Semi-finals in Rotterdam, Netherlands.

Magis medalled at three tournaments, winning bronze at the 2013 EuroHockey Championships and 2014 Champions Trophy, and silver at the 2015 EuroHockey Championships.

Magis has not been called into the national squad since 2017, after a calf injury prevented her from competing.

==== International goals ====
Goal	Date	Location	Opponent	Score	Result	Competition	Ref.
1	18 June 2013	HC Rotterdam, Rotterdam, Netherlands	India	4–1	8–1	2012–13 HWL Semi–finals	
2	20 January 2014	Hartleyvale Stadium, Cape Town, South Africa	South Africa	5–1	5–1	Test Match	
3	18 November 2014	HC Zwolle, Zwolle, Netherlands	Germany	3–1	3–2	Test Match	
4	26 August 2015	Lee Valley Hockey and Tennis Centre, London, England	Belgium	1–0	5–0	2015 EuroHockey Championship	
