= Georgie Parker (field hockey) =

Australian rules footballer and former hockey player

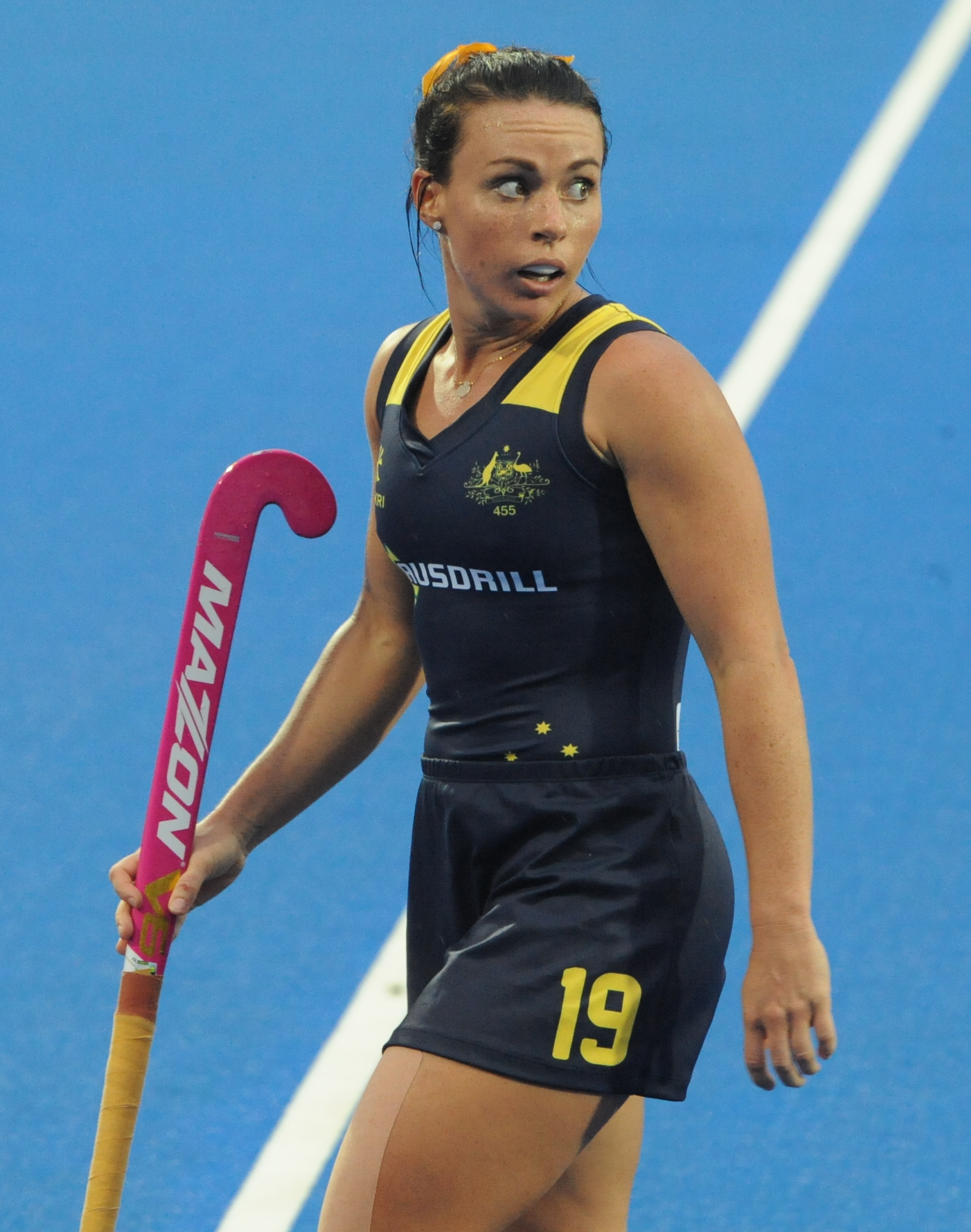
- Parker at the 2016 FIH Champions Trophy

Personal information
- Full name: Georgina Parker
- Born: 26 April 1989 (age 37) Berri, Australia
- Height: 160 cm (5 ft 3 in)

Sport
- Sport: Field hockey
- Position: Forward
Senior career
Years	Team	Caps	Goals
2009–2015	SA Suns	-	-
National team
Years	Team	Caps	Goals
2011–2016	Australia	108	(33)
Medal record
Women's field hockey
Representing Australia
World Cup
Silver medal – second place	2014 The Hague	Team
Commonwealth Games
Gold medal – first place	2014 Glasgow	Team
FIH World League
Silver medal – second place	2012–13 Tucúman	Team

Georgina "Georgie" Parker (born 26 April 1989) is an Australian rules footballer and former field hockey player for the Hockeyroos.

Parker was a member of the Australia women's national field hockey team that were defeated by the Netherlands women's national field hockey team in the final of the 2014 Women's Hockey World Cup, a gold medal winner at the 2014 Commonwealth Games and member of the team that went to the 2016 Summer Olympics.

== Field hockey ==
=== Club hockey ===
Parker played club hockey in the Riverland as a junior and later in Adelaide for the Adelaide Hockey Club. She also played a season for the Royal Antwerp Hockey Club in Belgium in 2016/17.

=== State hockey ===
In 2011, Parker was a member of the Australian Hockey League team the SA Suns (formerly Southern Suns) that won the national championship in Darwin. She was the only goalscorer in the grand final winning 1–0 against the NSW Arrows.

=== International hockey ===
Parker has played over 100 international games for the Hockeyroos, including playing at the Commonwealth Games, Summer Olympics and World Cup.

Her tournaments include:

- 2011 – Champions Trophy (Amstelveen, Netherlands) – 6th
- 2013 – World League Finals (Tucuman, Argentina) – 2nd
- 2013 – Oceania Cup (Stratford, New Zealand) – 1st
- 2013 – World League Semi-Final (London, England) – 1st
- 2013 – Hockey Super Series 9's (Perth, Australia) – 1st
- 2014 – 2014 Commonwealth Games (Glasgow, Scotland) – 1st
- 2014 – Women's Hockey World Cup (The Hague, Netherlands) – 2nd
- 2015 – World League Semi-Final (Antwerp, Belgium)- 3rd
- 2015 – Hawke's Bay Hockey Festival (Hawke's Bay, New Zealand) – 1st
- 2016 – Hawke's Bay Hockey Festival (Hawke's Bay, New Zealand) – 3rd
- 2016 – 2016 Women's Hockey Champions Trophy (London, Great Britain) – 4th
- 2016 – 2016 Summer Olympics (Rio de Janeiro, Brazil) – quarter finals

==== International goals ====
Goal	Date	Location	Opponent	Score	Result	Competition	Ref.
1	16 June 2011	Berliner HC, Berlin, Germany	Argentina	2–0	3–3	2011 Four Nations Cup	
2	7 March 2012	Perth Hockey Stadium, Perth, Australia	South Korea	2–0	5–0	Test Match	
3	29 June 2013	University of Westminster, London, England	China	3–1	4–1	2012–13 FIH World League Semifinal	
4	31 October 2013	Stratford Hockey Club, Stratford, Stratford	Samoa	18–0	23–0	2013 Oceania Cup	
5	2 November 2013	Stratford Hockey Club, Stratford, Stratford	Papua New Guinea	6–0	26–0	2013 Oceania Cup	
6	2 November 2013	Stratford Hockey Club, Stratford, Stratford	Papua New Guinea	12–0	26–0	2013 Oceania Cup	
7	2 November 2013	Stratford Hockey Club, Stratford, Stratford	Papua New Guinea	18–0	26–0	2013 Oceania Cup	
8	2 November 2013	Stratford Hockey Club, Stratford, Stratford	Papua New Guinea	22–0	26–0	2013 Oceania Cup	
9	3 December 2013	Club Natación y Gimnasia, San Miguel de Tucumán, Argentina	New Zealand	1–0	5–1	2012–13 FIH World League Final	
10	7 December 2013	Club Natación y Gimnasia, San Miguel de Tucumán, Argentina	England	2–0	3–0	2012–13 FIH World League Final	
11	21 March 2014	Eastern Goldfields Hockey Association, Kalgoorlie, Australia	Japan	1–1	6–1	Test Match	
12	21 March 2014	Eastern Goldfields Hockey Association, Kalgoorlie, Australia	Japan	6–1	6–1	Test Match	
13	25 March 2014	Perth Hockey Stadium, Perth, Australia	Japan	4–1	5–2	Test Match	
14	15 May 2014	Bremen HC, Bremen, Germany	England	2–1	4–2	2014 Four Nations Cup	
15	17 May 2014	Bremen HC, Bremen, Germany	Japan	1–0	6–1	2014 Four Nations Cup	
16	18 May 2014	Bremen HC, Bremen, Germany	Germany	3–3	3–3	2014 Four Nations Cup	
17	24 July 2014	Glasgow National Hockey Centre, Glasgow, Scotland	Malaysia	3–0	4–0	XX Commonwealth Games	
18	24 July 2014	Glasgow National Hockey Centre, Glasgow, Scotland	Malaysia	4–0	4–0	XX Commonwealth Games	
19	25 July 2014	Glasgow National Hockey Centre, Glasgow, Scotland	Wales	2–0	9–0	XX Commonwealth Games	
20	25 July 2014	Glasgow National Hockey Centre, Glasgow, Scotland	Wales	7–0	9–0	XX Commonwealth Games	
21	25 July 2014	Glasgow National Hockey Centre, Glasgow, Scotland	Wales	8–0	9–0	XX Commonwealth Games	
22	1 August 2014	Glasgow National Hockey Centre, Glasgow, Scotland	South Africa	4–0	7–1	XX Commonwealth Games	
23	1 August 2014	Glasgow National Hockey Centre, Glasgow, Scotland	South Africa	6–1	7–1	XX Commonwealth Games	
24	18 April 2015	Hawke's Bay Hockey, Hastings, New Zealand	China	3–1	4–0	2015 Hawke's Bay Cup	
25	21 June 2015	Koninklijke Hockey Club Dragons, Antwerp, Belgium	Poland	2–0	9–0	2014–15 FIH World League Semifinal	
26	21 January 2016	Sengkang Hockey Stadium, Singapore	Germany	2–1	3–1	Test Match	
27	20 February 2016	Perth Hockey Stadium, Perth, Australia	Great Britain	1–1	1–1	Test Match	
28	2 April 2016	Hawke's Bay Hockey, Hastings, New Zealand	Japan	1–1	1–1	2016 Hawke's Bay Cup	
29	3 April 2016	Hawke's Bay Hockey, Hastings, New Zealand	South Korea	1–0	2–0	2016 Hawke's Bay Cup	
30	7 April 2016	Hawke's Bay Hockey, Hastings, New Zealand	Ireland	1–0	3–0	2016 Hawke's Bay Cup	
31	7 April 2016	Hawke's Bay Hockey, Hastings, New Zealand	Ireland	3–0	3–0	2016 Hawke's Bay Cup	
32	25 June 2016	Lee Valley Hockey and Tennis Centre, London, England	Great Britain	2–0	4–1	2016 FIH Champions Trophy	
33	10 August 2016	Deodoro Hockey Stadium, Rio de Janeiro, Brazil	India	4–0	6–1	XXXI Olympic Games	

== AFL Women's career ==
Georgie Parker
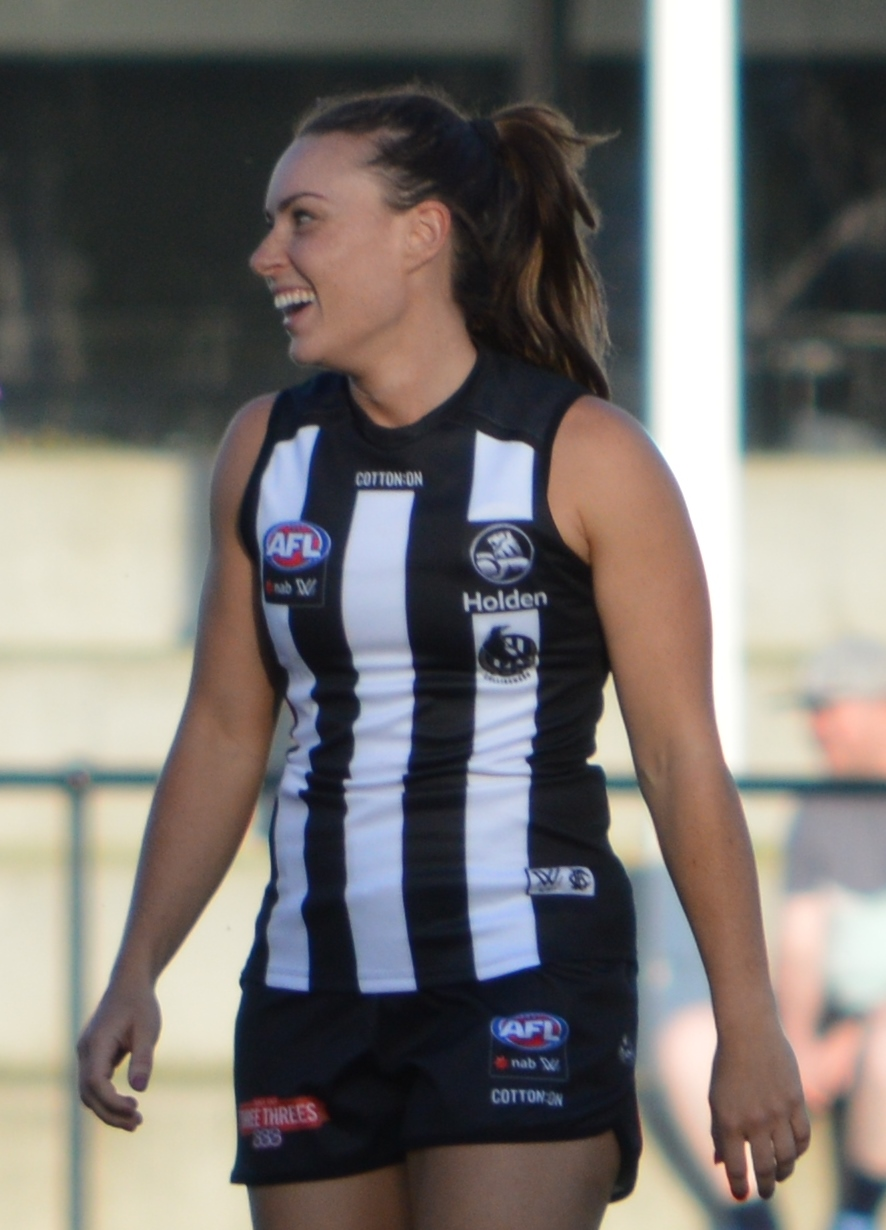
Parker playing Australian rules football for Collingwood in January 2018
Australian rules football career
Personal information
- Height: 160 cm (5 ft 3 in)
- Weight: 52 kg (115 lb)
- Position: Utility
Playing career^{1}
Years	Club	Games (Goals)
2018–2019	Collingwood	3 (0)
- ^{1} Playing statistics correct to the end of the 2019 season.

In May 2017, Parker signed with Collingwood as a rookie for the 2018 AFL Women's season, fielding an offer from Adelaide too. She had no prior experience playing Australian football, but Collingwood viewed her as a potential midfield and forward line option.

On 4 June 2018, Parker was elevated to Collingwood's senior list ahead of the 2019 season.

In April 2019, Parker was delisted by Collingwood.

=== Statistics ===
Statistics are correct to the end of the 2019 season.

Legend
G	Goals	K	Kicks	D	Disposals	T	Tackles
B	Behinds	H	Handballs	M	Marks

Season	Team	No.	Games	Totals							Averages (per game)						
Season	Team	No.	Games	G	B	K	H	D	M	T	G	B	K	H	D	M	T
2018	Collingwood	19	2	0	0	4	7	11	1	3	0.0	0.0	2.0	3.5	5.5	0.5	1.5
2019	Collingwood	19	1	0	0	2	0	2	0	4	0.0	0.0	2.0	0.0	2.0	0.0	4.0
Career			3	0	0	6	7	13	1	7	0.0	0.0	2.0	2.3	4.3	0.3	2.3

== Media career ==
Parker has a double degree in Journalism and PR.

As at 2022, she is the host of the Seven Network TV show "Armchair Experts" – an analysis of the Australian Football League scene.

== Personal life ==
Parker lives in Perth, Western Australia, as part of the national training program, having grown up in South Australia.
