= Jang Hee-sun =

South Korean field hockey player

Personal information
- Born: 31 May 1986 (age 40)
- Height: 1.64 m (5 ft 5 in)
- Weight: 58 kg (128 lb)

Sport
- Sport: Field hockey
National team
Years	Team	Caps	Goals
2015–	South Korea	36	-
Medal record
Women's field hockey
Representing South Korea
Asia Cup
Bronze medal – third place	2017 Gifu

- Jang Hee-sun
- Hangul: 장희선
- RR: Jang Huiseon
- MR: Chang Hŭisŏn

Jang Hee-sun (Korean: 장희선; born 31 May 1986) is a South Korean field hockey player. She competed for the South Korea women's national field hockey team at the 2016 Summer Olympics.
