= Kristina Hillmann =

German field hockey player

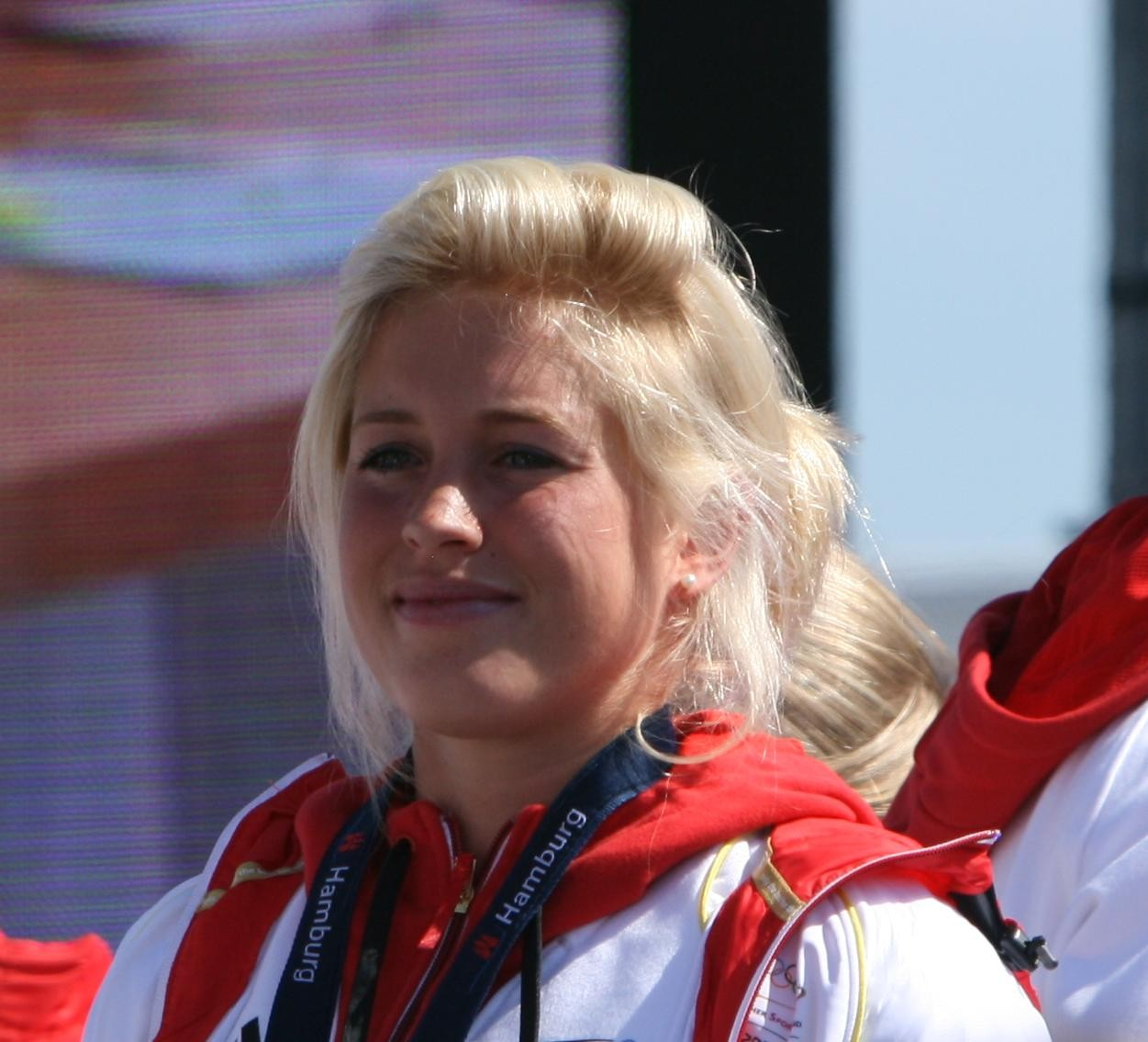
- Hillmann in 2012

Personal information
- Born: 5 September 1991 (age 34); Basel, Switzerland
- Height: 166 cm (5 ft 5 in)
- Weight: 58 kg (128 lb)

Kristina Hillmann (born 5 September 1991) is a German field hockey player. At the 2012 Summer Olympics, she competed for the Germany women's national field hockey team in the women's event.
