= Katharina Otte =

German field hockey player (born 1987)

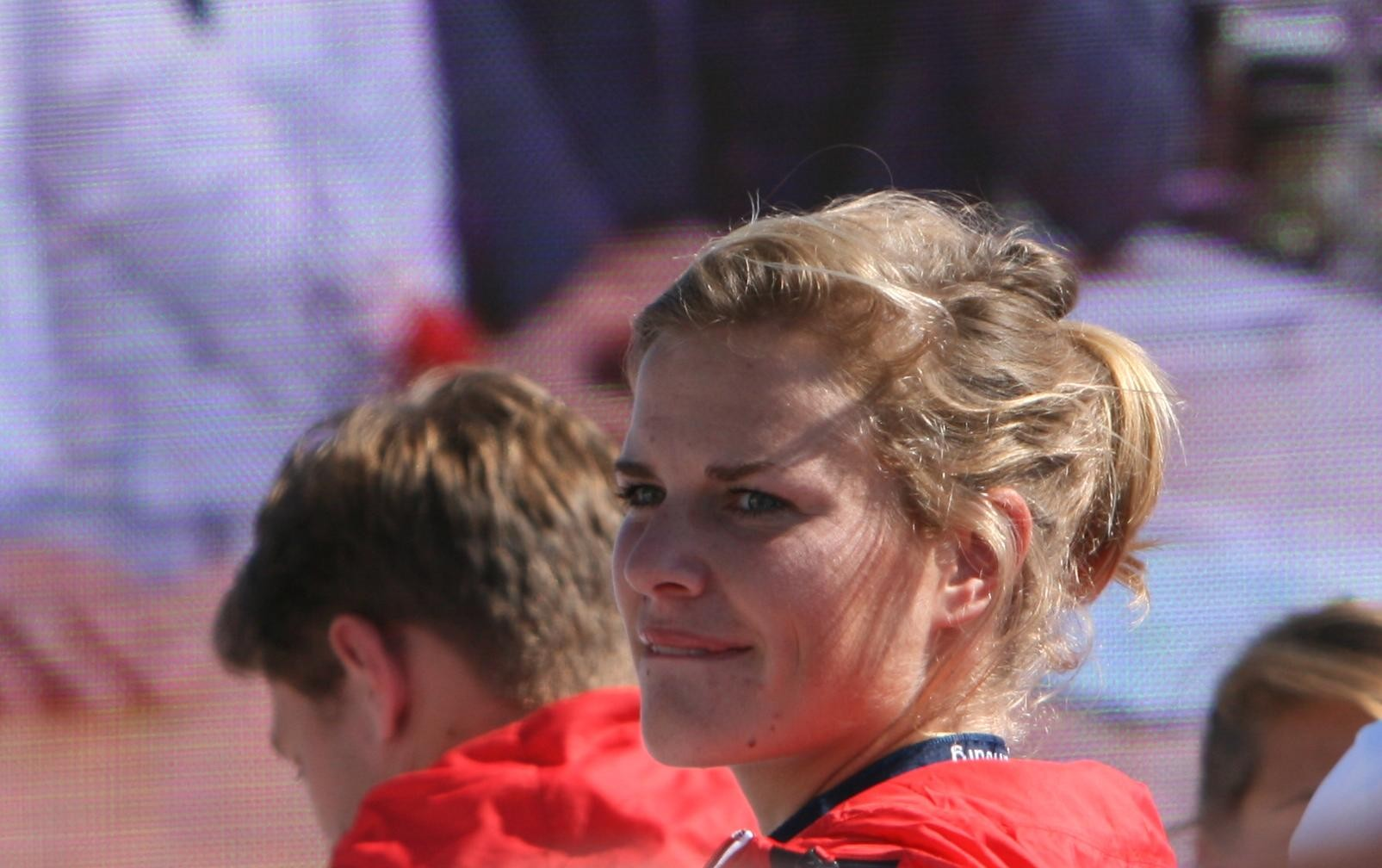

Personal information
- Born: 29 May 1987 (age 39) Hamburg, West Germany
- Height: 1.70 m (5 ft 7 in)
- Weight: 61 kg (134 lb)

Sport
- Sport: Field hockey
Medal record
Women's field hockey
Representing Germany
Olympic Games
Bronze medal – third place	2016 Rio de Janeiro	Team

Katharina Otte (born 29 May 1987 in Hamburg) is a German field hockey player. At the 2012 Summer Olympics, she competed for the Germany women's national field hockey team in the women's event.
