= Maike Stöckel =

German field hockey player

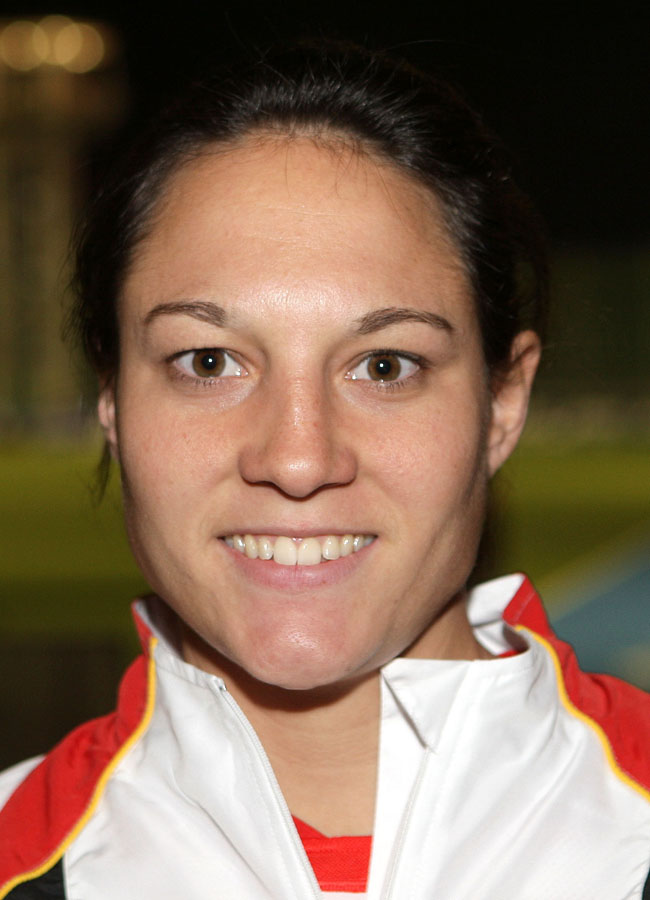
- Stöckel in 2008

Personal information
- Born: 6 March 1984 (age 42); Bielefeld
- Height: 165 cm (5 ft 5 in)
- Weight: 63 kg (139 lb)

Maike Stöckel (born 6 March 1984 in Bielefeld) is a German field hockey player who competed in the 2008 and 2012 Summer Olympics.
