= Ayaka Nishimura =

Japanese field hockey player

Medal record

Women's field hockey

Representing Japan

Asian Champions Trophy
Gold medal – first place	2013 Kakamigahara	
Bronze medal – third place	2016 Singapore	

Ayaka Nishimura (西村 綾加, Nishimura Ayaka; born May 10, 1989) is a Japanese field hockey player. She competed for the Japan women's national field hockey team at the 2016 Summer Olympics.
