= Pietie Coetzee =

South African field hockey player

Pietie Coetzee-Turner
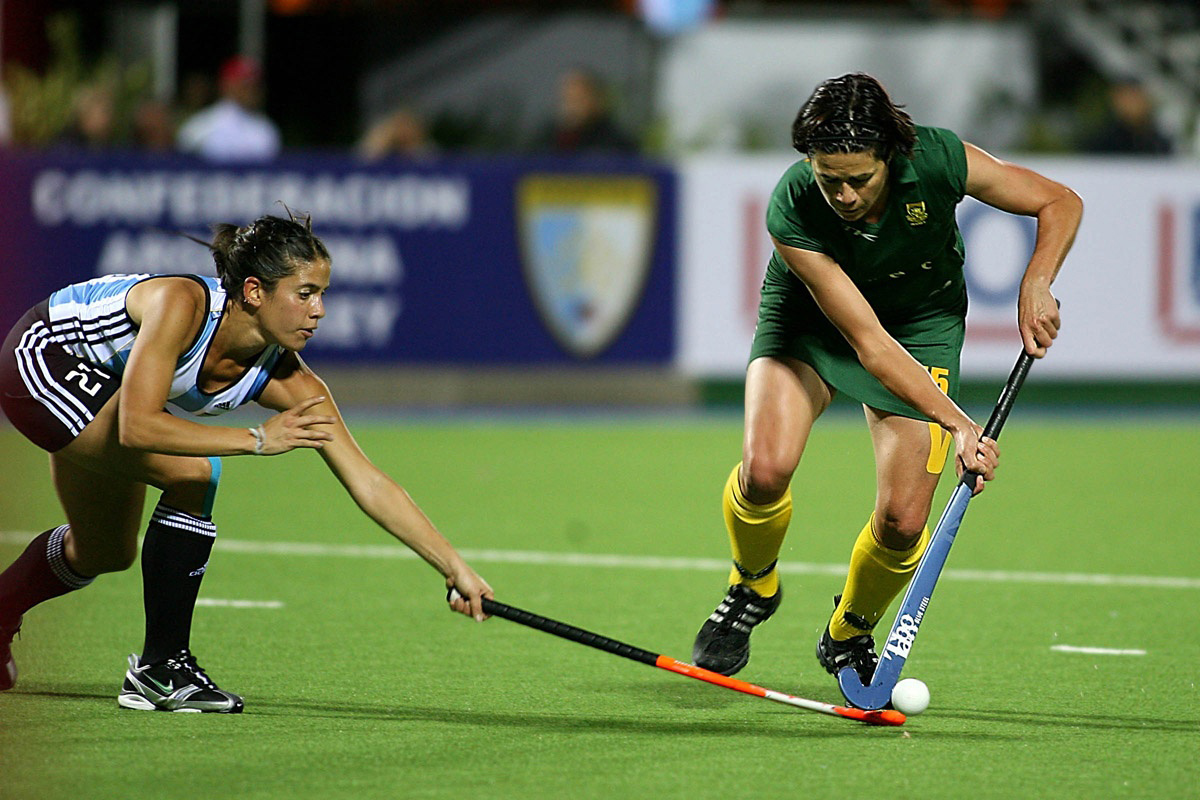
- 2010 Hockey World Cup

Personal information
- Born: Pietie Coetzee; 2 September 1978 (age 47) Bloemfontein, South Africa
- Height: 176 cm (5 ft 9 in)
- Weight: 69 kg (152 lb)

Sport
- Sport: Field hockey
- Position: Forward
National team
Years	Team	Caps	Goals
1995–2014	South Africa	287	(282)
Coaching career
- Years: Team
- 2017–2019: University of the Witwatersrand
- 2019–present: University of Massachusetts
Medal record
Representing South Africa
All-Africa Games
Gold medal – first place	2003 Abuja	Team
Afro-Asian Games
Silver medal – second place	2003 Hyderabad	Team
Champions Challenge
Silver medal – second place	2005 Virginia Beach	Team

Pietie Coetzee-Turner (née Coetzee; born 2 September 1978) is a field hockey player from South Africa who was born in Bloemfontein. she studied at the Rand Afrikaans University in Johannesburg, Gauteng, and represented her country at the 2000, 2004 and 2012 Summer Olympics.

A striker, Coetzee played club hockey with Amsterdam, Netherlands in the late 1990s. She made her international senior debut for the South African Women's Team in 1995 against Spain during the Atlanta Challenge Cup in Atlanta, Georgia. She was named the South African Hockey Player of the Year in 1997 and in 2002. Coetzee was the top goal scorer at the 2002 Women's Hockey World Cup held in Perth, Western Australia, where South Africa finished in 13th position. In 2007, she played briefly at NMHC Nijmegen in the Netherlands. Pietie Coetzee became the all-time leading goal scorer in women's international hockey on 21 June 2011 with the third of four goals she scored in a 5–5 draw against the United States in the Champions Challenge in Dublin. It took her to 221 goals, bettering the 20-year-old world record of Russia's Natella Krasnikova.

== International senior tournaments ==
- 1995 – All Africa Games, Harare
- 1998 – World Cup, Utrecht
- 1998 – Commonwealth Games, Kuala Lumpur
- 1999 – All Africa Games, Johannesburg
- 2000 – Champions Trophy, Amstelveen
- 2000 – Olympic Games, Sydney
- 2002 – Champions Challenge, Johannesburg
- 2002 – Commonwealth Games, Manchester
- 2002 – World Cup, Perth
- 2003 – All Africa Games, Abuja
- 2003 – Afro-Asian Games, Hyderabad
- 2004 – Olympic Games, Athens
- 2005 – Champions Challenge, Virginia Beach
- 2012 − Olympic Games, London
