= Lydia Haase =

German field hockey player

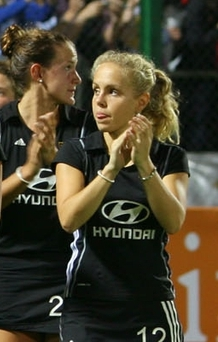
- 2010 Women's Hockey World Cup

Personal information
- Full name: Lydia Bechthold-Haase
- Born: 7 September 1986 (age 40) Leipzig, Germany
- Height: 164 cm (5 ft 5 in)
- Weight: 60 kg (132 lb)

Sport
- Sport: Field hockey
- Position: Forward
- Club: Mannheimer HC
National team
Years	Team	Caps	Goals
2005–2007	Germany U–21	49	(9)
2009–2016	Germany	173	(41)
Medal record
Women's field hockey
Representing Germany
FIH World League
Bronze medal – third place	2014–15 Rosario	Team
European Championship
Gold medal – first place	2013 Boom	Team
Silver medal – second place	2009 Amsterdam	Team
Silver medal – second place	2011 Mönchengladbach	Team
Bronze medal – third place	2015 London	Team

Lydia Haase (born 7 September 1986) is a former German field hockey player, who played as a forward for the Germany women's national field hockey team.

== Personal life ==
Lydia Haase was born and raised in Leipzig.

Haase works as a teacher at Baulandschule Hettingen, an elementary school in Buchen.

Her sister Mandy also is an international hockey player.

== Career ==
=== Under–21 ===
In 2006, Haase was a member of the Germany U–21 team at the EuroHockey Junior Championship in Catania. At the tournament, Germany won a gold medal.

=== Die Danas ===
Haase made her senior debut for Germany in 2009, during a test match in South Africa. Later that year she also represented the team at 2009 Women's Hockey Champions Trophy in Sydney.

Throughout her career, Haase appeared represented Germany at four European Championships. She medalled in each tournament, winning a gold medal in 2013, silver in 2009 and 2011, as well as bronze in 2015.
