= Michelle Meister =

German field hockey umpire (b. 1978)

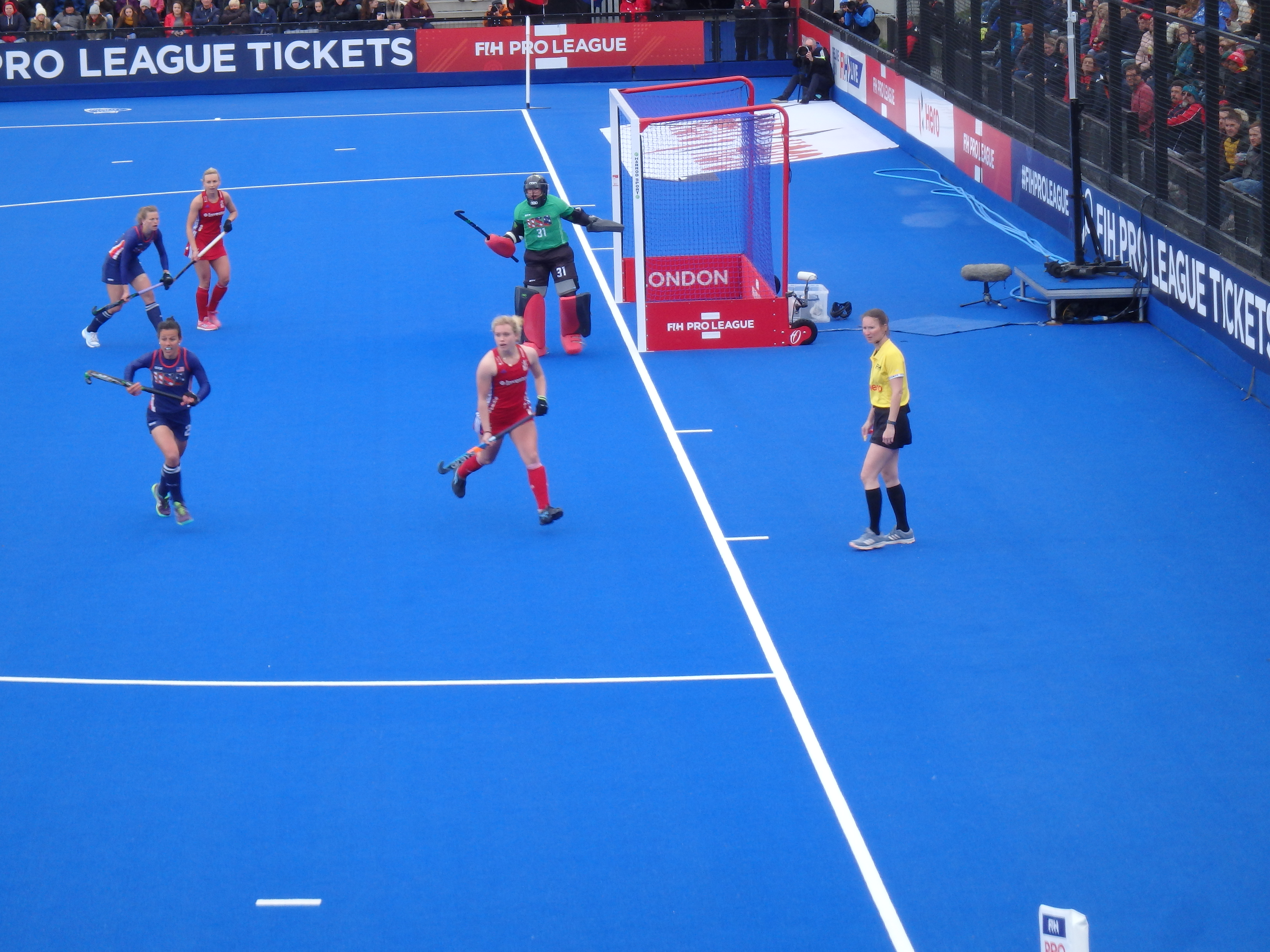
- Meister umpiring a Great Britain vs USA FIH Pro League match in 2019
- Born: 1978 (age 47–48)
- Known for: Field hockey umpire
- Awards: 2018 FIH Umpire of the Year

Michelle Meister (born 1978) is a German field hockey umpire. She was the 2018 FIH Umpire of the Year and was one of the two first women to umpire at the Euro Hockey League. She umpires for the Köpenicker Hockey-Union in Berlin.

== Umpiring career ==
Meister previously played hockey for 20 years, from the age of 7, until she had to quit because of a herniated disc. She started umpiring in 2005 and umpired her first match in the German national league in 2007. She has since umpired almost 300 matches in this league. Her first international appointment was the 2009 European Indoor Club Cup in Madrid, Spain. She umpired both the 2014 World Cup in The Hague and the 2018 World Cup in London. At the 2016 Olympic Games she umpired the opening match between Argentina and USA. In 2017 she received the 'Goldene Ehrennadel' award from the German Hockey Federation.

In 2018 Meister made history, together with fellow umpire Laurine Delforge, by being the first female umpire in the Euro Hockey League, the annual European men's field hockey cup competition.

In 2019 it was announced that Meister was awarded the 2018 Umpire of the Year award by the FIH. On 12 October Meister umpired her 300th game in the German Bundesliga.

== International tournament appointments ==
- Indoor EuroHockey Club Cup - 2009 (Madrid)
- Indoor European Cup - 2010 (Duisburg), 2012 (Leipzig) and 2016; (Minsk)
- Indoor World Cup - 2011 (Poznan), 2015 (Leipzig), 2018 (Berlin)
- EuroHockey Club Cup - 2010 (Berlin), 2013 (Bloemendaal), 2014 (Den Bosch), 2015 (Bilthoven), 2017 (Bloemendaal), 2018 (London)
- European Cup - 2011 (Mönchengladbach), 2015 (London), 2017 (Amsterdam)
- Hockey World Cup - 2014 (The Hague), 2018 (London)
- Champions Trophy - 2012 (Rosario)
- Olympic Games - 2016 (Rio de Janeiro)
