= Natascha Keller =

German field hockey player (born 1977)

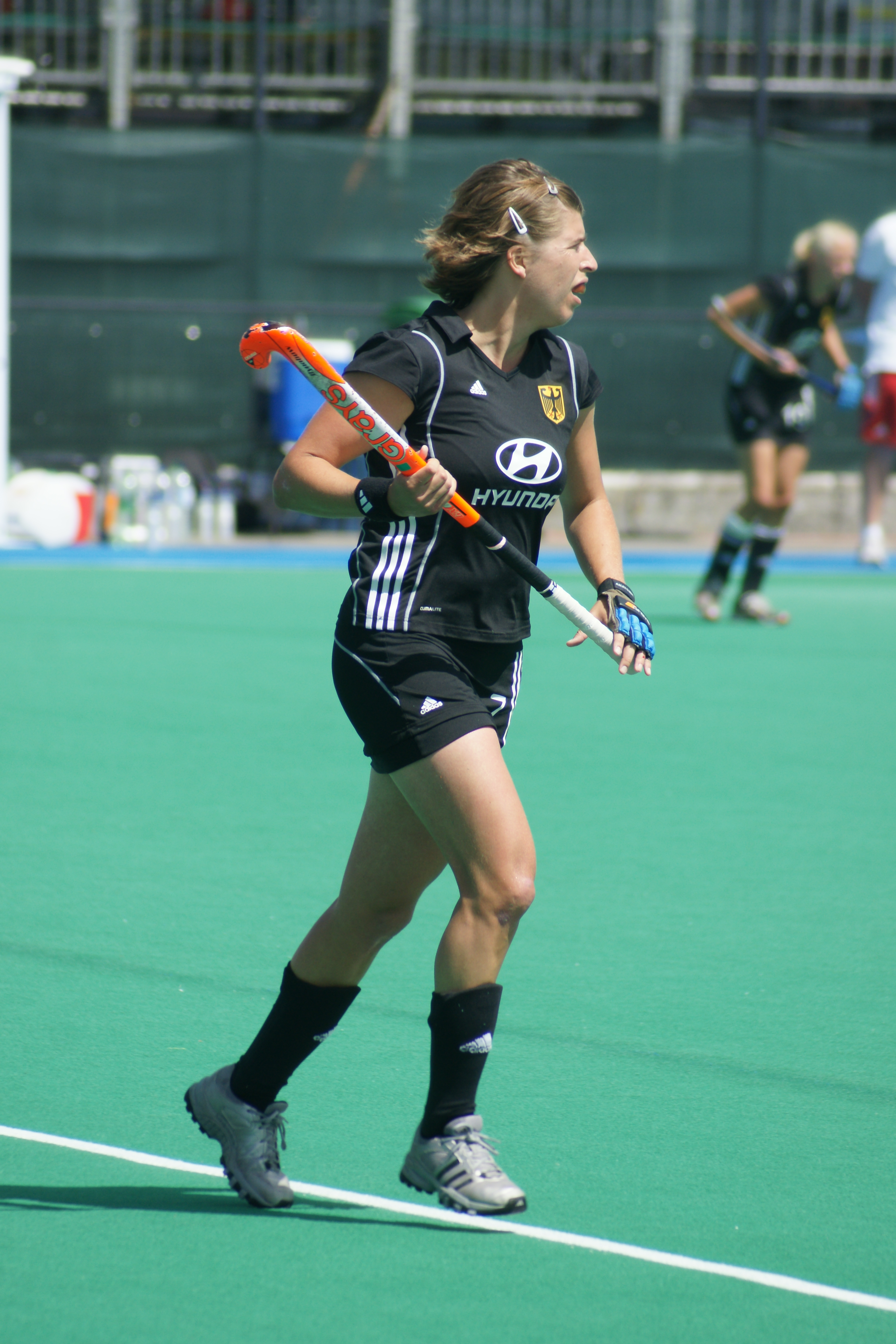
- Keller playing for Germany in 2009

Personal information
- Born: 3 July 1977 (age 48) West Berlin
- Height: 170 cm (5 ft 7 in)
- Weight: 69 kg (152 lb)

Sport
- Sport: Field hockey
Medal record
Women's field hockey
Representing Germany
Olympic Games
Gold medal – first place	2004 Athens	Team Competition
European Nations Cup
Silver medal – second place	1999 Cologne	Team Competition
Silver medal – second place	2011 Gladbach	Team Competition
Bronze medal – third place	1995 Amstelveen	Team Competition

Natascha Keller (born 3 July 1977 in West Berlin) is a German retired field hockey striker. She won a gold medal as a member of the German team at the 2004 Summer Olympics. She also competed at the 1996 Summer Olympics, 2000 Summer Olympics, 2008 Summer Olympics and 2012 Summer Olympics. In 1999 she received an award from the International Hockey Federation.

Keller is the daughter of retired Olympic field hockey player Carsten Keller and granddaughter of player Erwin Keller. Her brothers Andreas Keller and Florian Keller, like her father and herself, were on gold medal-winning field hockey teams, all as strikers.

Keller has accumulated over 400 games for the Germany women's national field hockey team, which makes her the country's most capped female player in history. Keller was the flag bearer for Germany at the 2012 Summer Olympics, becoming the first field hockey athlete being honour.

Keller is in the Guinness Book of Records with 425 international field hockey caps from 1994 to 2012.

== Literature ==
- National Olympics Committee for Germany: Die deutsche Olympiamannschaft. Athen 2004. Frankfurt am Main 2004

Olympic Games
Preceded by Dirk Nowitzki	Flagbearer for Germany; London 2012	Succeeded by Timo Boll
