= Julia Müller =

German field hockey player

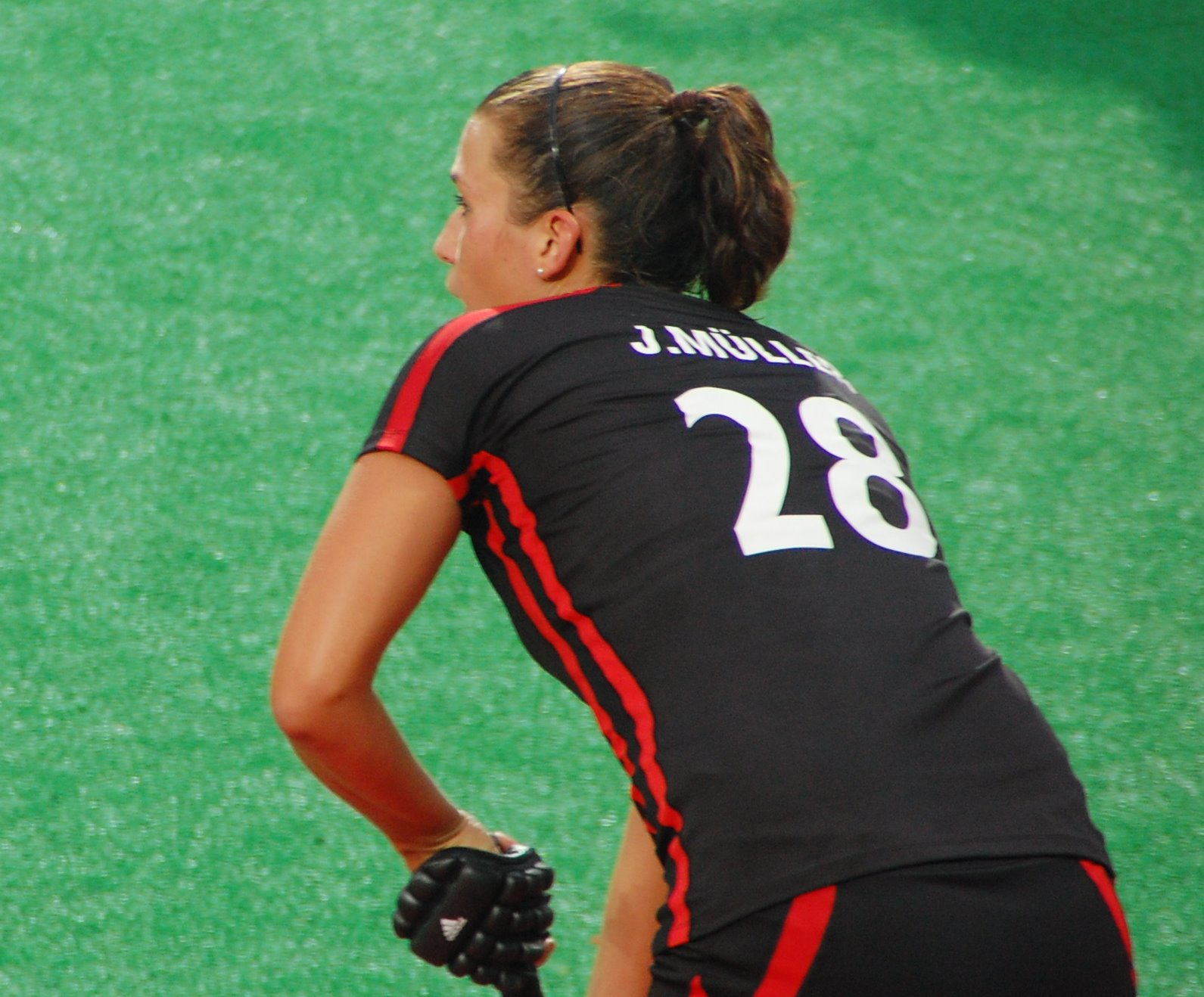
- Müller at the Beijing 2008 Olympics

Personal information
- Born: 10 December 1985 (age 40) Hamburg, West Germany
- Height: 1.70 m (5 ft 7 in)
- Weight: 71 kg (157 lb)

Sport
- Sport: Field hockey
Medal record
Women's field hockey
Representing Germany
Olympic Games
Bronze medal – third place	2016 Rio de Janeiro	Team

Julia Müller (born 10 December 1985) is a German field hockey national team player who competed in the 2008 Summer Olympics and the 2012 Summer Olympics. In August 2019, she was inducted into the European Hockey Federation Hall of Fame.
