= Tina Bachmann (field hockey) =

German field hockey player

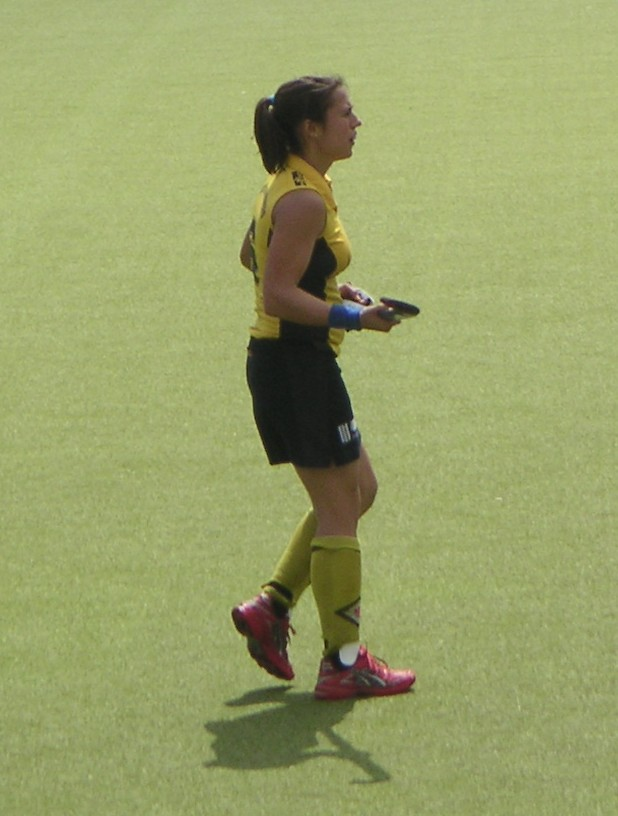
- Bachmann in 2007

Personal information
- Born: 1 August 1978 (age 48) Mülheim, North Rhine- Westphalia, West Germany
- Height: 1.65 m (5 ft 5 in)
- Weight: 64 kg (141 lb)

Sport
- Sport: Field hockey
- Position: Defender
Senior career
Years	Team	Caps	Goals
2000–2004	Club Raffelberg	-	-
2004–2008	Eintracht Braunschweig	-	-
2008–2009	Laren	-	-
2009–2014	Oranje Zwart	-	-
National team
Years	Team	Caps	Goals
2000–2014	Germany	255	-
Medal record
Women's field hockey
Representing Germany
Olympic Games
Gold medal – first place	2004 Athens	Team
Champions Trophy
Gold medal – first place	2006 Amstelveen	Team

Tina Bachmann (born 1 August 1978 in Mülheim, North Rhine-Westphalia) is a retired German field hockey player. She represented Germany in two editions of the Olympic Games (2004 and 2008), and also often played as a midfielder and an experienced central defender. Bachmann was also a member of the Germany women's national field hockey team who attained a great success in the mid and late 2000s, capturing three gold medals at the 2004 Summer Olympics, 2006 Women's Hockey Champions Trophy, and 2007 Women's EuroHockey Nations Championship.

== Career ==
Bachmann started playing field hockey at the age of five under the influence of her father Hans-Gerd Bachmann, a former player for the West German team and 1978 EuroHockey Nations champion. Bachmann began training for the junior squad at HTC Uhlenhorst Mülheim, until she joined the Club Raffelberg Duisburg in 1996. Four years later, she was officially selected to the women's senior national team, and eventually competed in numerous field hockey tournaments across Germany and the rest of Europe. From 2004 to 2008, Bachmann played for Eintracht Braunschweig hockey club. From 2009 to 2014, she played for Dutch club Oranje Zwart.

Bachmann made her official debut at the 2004 Summer Olympics in Athens, where she competed as a member of the German squad in the women's field hockey tournament. Collecting a total of two triumphs, two losses, and six classification points in the group stage, Bachmann helped her squad defeat China in the semifinals through a penalty knock-out, and later, scored a goal of 2–1 to upset the daunting Dutch team for her nation's first ever gold medal in Olympic sporting history.

Adding to a laundry list of her accomplishments, Bachmann continued a winning streak for the Germans by taking home two more golds in the women's tournament at the 2006 Women's Hockey Champions Trophy in Amstelveen, Netherlands, and at the 2007 Women's EuroHockey Nations Championship in Manchester, England.

At the 2008 Summer Olympics in Beijing, Bachmann qualified for the second time as a member of the German squad and defending champion in the women's field hockey tournament after receiving an automatic berth from the EuroHockey Nations Championships. Unlike the previous Games, she and the rest of the German squad could not capitalize on their last chance for a penalty corner at the final second, and were defeated in the semifinal match against China with a set score of 2–3. In the bronze medal final, Bachmann and her teammates shortened their chances of a medal, as the Germans lost the match to World No. 2 Argentina with a score of 1–3.

Bachmann continued to compete for the German women's senior team until she temporarily retired in 2010. Three years later, she sought her sights to return to the team after being called for its configuration by new coach Jamilon Mülders. On that same year, at the 2013 Women's EuroHockey Nations Championship in Boom, Belgium, Bachmann reclaimed her status in the international hockey stage, as she and the Germans outclassed the Brits for a gold medal through a penalty shootout and a thrilling 4–4 draw in their first final after 22 years. In addition to the prestigious EuroHockey trophy, Bachmann had been elected as the Best Player of the Tournament.

Since 2014, Bachmann is the head coach of the men's team of Uhlenhorster HC.

== Awards and honours ==
Germany

- 2004 – Olympic Qualifier, Auckland (4th place)
- 2004 – Summer Olympics, Athens (1st place)
- 2004 – Champions Trophy, Rosario (2nd place)
- 2007 – EuroHockey Nations Championships, Dublin (2nd place)
- 2005 – Champions Trophy, Canberra (5th place)
- 2006 – Champions Trophy, Amstelveen (1st place)
- 2006 – World Cup, Madrid (8th)
- 2007 – Champions Trophy, Quilmes (3rd place)
- 2007 – EuroHockey Nations Championships, Manchester (1st place)
- 2008 – Summer Olympics, Beijing (4th place)
- 2009 – EuroHockey Nations Championships, Amstelveen (2nd place)
- 2013 – EuroHockey Nations Championships, Boom (1st place)
