= Australia women's national field hockey team results (2016–2020) =

The following article comprises the results of the Hockeyroos, the women's national field hockey team from Australia, from 2016 until 2020. New fixtures can be found on the International Hockey Federation's results portal.

== Match results ==
=== 2016 Results ===
Year	Pld	W	D	L	GF	GA	GD	Pts
2016 statistics	39	19	7	13	84	58	+26	64

==== TPG Tri-Nations Test Series ====
18 January 2016 Test Match	Australia	1–1	Germany	Singapore
19:00	Stewart 10'	Report	Müller 23'

20 January 2016 Test Match	Netherlands	2–0	Australia	Singapore
19:00	Verschoor 13'; Drost 29'	Report

21 January 2016 Test Match	Australia	3–1	Germany	Singapore
19:00	Peris 10'; Parker 18'; Morgan 42'	Report	Mävers 23'

23 January 2016 Test Match	Netherlands	4–1	Australia	Singapore
18:30	Paumen 21' van As 48', 56'; Jonker 54'	Report	Smith 47'

==== Great Britain Test Series ====
12 February 2016 Test Match	Australia	4–3	Great Britain	Bunbury, Australia
17:30	Slattery 10', 20'; Williams 24'; Nelson 39'	Report	MacLeod 11'; Watton 19'; Bray 40'	Stadium: Bunbury Hockey Stadium

14 February 2016 Test Match	Australia	0–1	Great Britain	Bunbury, Australia
14:00		Report	Gilbert 18'	Stadium: Bunbury Hockey Stadium

16 February 2016 Test Match	Australia	3–3	Great Britain	Perth, Australia
18:00	Nance 8'; McMahon 37'; Nelson 54'	Report	Cullen 7'; Watton 31'; H. Richardson-Walsh 47'	Stadium: Perth Hockey Stadium

18 February 2016 Test Match	Australia	2–2	Great Britain	Perth, Australia
18:00	Nanscawen 20'; Smith 55'	Report	Ansley 28', 50'	Stadium: Perth Hockey Stadium

20 February 2016 Test Match	Australia	1–1	Great Britain	Perth, Australia
15:00	Parker 31'	Report	Haycroft 29'	Stadium: Perth Hockey Stadium

21 February 2016 Test Match	Australia	3–2	Great Britain	Perth, Australia
15:00	Morgan 5'; Smith 26'; Stewart 35'	Report	Bray 56'; Leigh 57'	Stadium: Perth Hockey Stadium

==== China Test Match ====
24 March 2016 Test Match	Australia	3–1	China	Perth, Australia
18:00	White 11'; Barden 48'; Fitzpatrick 54'	Report	Wang 43'	Stadium: Perth Hockey Stadium

==== Hawke's Bay Cup ====
2 April 2016 Group Stage	Australia	1–1	Japan	Hastings, New Zealand
13:00	Parker 53'	Report	Nakashima 13'	Stadium: Hawke's Bay Sports Park

3 April 2016 Group Stage	Australia	2–0	South Korea	Hastings, New Zealand
13:00	Parker 33'; Stewart 38'	Report		Stadium: Hawke's Bay Sports Park

5 April 2016 Group Stage	Australia	4–0	Canada	Hastings, New Zealand
14:00	Morgan 9'; Kenny 14'; Stewart 18', 56'	Report		Stadium: Hawke's Bay Sports Park

7 April 2016 Quarterfinals	Australia	3–0	Ireland	Hastings, New Zealand
14:30	Parker 11', 56'; Nelson 40'	Report		Stadium: Hawke's Bay Sports Park

9 April 2016 Semi-finals	New Zealand	3–2	Australia	Hastings, New Zealand
18:15	Harrison 24'; Merry 30'; Hayward 45'	Report	Slattery 14', 22'	Stadium: Hawke's Bay Sports Park

10 April 2016 Bronze Medal Match	China	1–3	Australia	Hastings, New Zealand
15:00	Xi 45'	Report	Stewart 2'; Morgan 33'; Kenny 38'	Stadium: Hawke's Bay Sports Park

==== International Hockey Open ====
31 May 2016 Group Stage	Australia	3–1	Japan	Darwin, Australia
19:00	Kenny 9'; White 18'; Nanscawen 38'	Report	Kawamura 22'	Stadium: Marrara Hockey Centre

1 June 2016 Group Stage	Australia	2–1	New Zealand	Darwin, Australia
19:00	Morgan 38'; Smith 46'	Report	Merry 21'	Stadium: Marrara Hockey Centre

3 June 2016 Group Stage	Australia	2–1	India	Darwin, Australia
19:00	Stewart 9'; Smith 55'	Report	Minz 12'	Stadium: Marrara Hockey Centre

4 June 2016 Final	Australia	0–2	New Zealand	Darwin, Australia
19:30		Report	Smith 24'; Merry 30'	Stadium: Marrara Hockey Centre

==== Champions Trophy ====
18 June 2016 Group Stage	United States	2–2	Australia	London, United Kingdom
12:00	Witmer 19' van Sickle 47'	Report	Slattery 13'; Stewart 33'	Stadium: Lee Valley Hockey and Tennis Centre

19 June 2016 Group Stage	Australia	3–1	New Zealand	London, United Kingdom
16:00	Smith 3'; Kenny 18'; Stewart 40'	Report	McLaren 3'	Stadium: Lee Valley Hockey and Tennis Centre

21 June 2016 Group Stage	Australia	1–2	Argentina	London, United Kingdom
14:30	Slattery 56'	Report	Barrionuevo 41'; Rebecchi 53'	Stadium: Lee Valley Hockey and Tennis Centre

23 June 2016 Group Stage	Australia	1–2	Netherlands	London, United Kingdom
18:00	Slattery 51'	Report	Van der Pols 6'; Paumen 31'	Stadium: Lee Valley Hockey and Tennis Centre

25 June 2016 Group Stage	Great Britain	1–4	Australia	London, United Kingdom
16:00	Bray 16'	Report	Slattery 5'; Parker 6'; Smith 33'; Kenny 38'	Stadium: Lee Valley Hockey and Tennis Centre

26 June 2016 Bronze Medal Match	Australia	2–2 (0–1 p)	United States	London, United Kingdom
16:15	Williams 15'; Stewart 34'	Report	Bam 42', 57'	Stadium: Lee Valley Hockey and Tennis Centre
	Penalties
	Nanscawen (penalty shoot-out missed); Blyth (penalty shoot-out missed); Parker (penalty shoot-out missed); Williams (penalty shoot-out missed); Sablowski (penalty shoot-out missed)		(penalty shoot-out scored) Gonzalez; (penalty shoot-out missed) Falgowski; (penalty shoot-out missed) Dawson; (penalty shoot-out missed) Kolojejchick; (penalty shoot-out missed) Dawson

==== Olympic Games ====
6 August 2016 Group Stage	Great Britain	2–1	Australia	Rio de Janeiro, Brazil
20:30	Owsley 26'; Danson 43'	Report	Morgan 33'	Stadium: Olympic Hockey Centre

8 August 2016 Group Stage	Australia	1–2	United States	Rio de Janeiro, Brazil
10:00	Slattery 43'	Report	Vittese 25'; Van Sickle 41'	Stadium: Olympic Hockey Centre

10 August 2016 Group Stage	India	1–6	Australia	Rio de Janeiro, Brazil
11:00	Thokchom 60'	Report	Slattery 5'; Morgan 9'; Claxton 35'; Parker 36'; Kenny 43', 46'	Stadium: Olympic Hockey Centre

11 August 2016 Group Stage	Australia	1–0	Argentina	Rio de Janeiro, Brazil
18:00	Smith 33'	Report		Stadium: Olympic Hockey Centre

13 August 2016 Group Stage	Australia	2–0	Japan	Rio de Janeiro, Brazil
19:30	Williams 17'; Smith 55'	Report		Stadium: Olympic Hockey Centre

15 August 2016 Quarterfinals	New Zealand	4–2	Australia	Rio de Janeiro, Brazil
10:00	McLaren 7'; Smith 24'; Flynn 39'; Merry 44'	Report	Slattery 33', 59'	Stadium: Olympic Hockey Centre

==== Trans-Tasman Trophy ====
17 November 2016 Test Match	New Zealand	0–6	Australia	Auckland, New Zealand
18:30		Report	Commerford 17'; Slattery 33', 55'; Morgan 40'; Nanscawen 44'; Fey 48'	Stadium: North Harbour Hockey Stadium

19 November 2016 Test Match	New Zealand	2–0	Australia	Auckland, New Zealand
20:00	Merry 24'; McCann 27'	Report		Stadium: North Harbour Hockey Stadium

20 November 2016 Test Match	New Zealand	3–2	Australia	Auckland, New Zealand
18:00	Pearce 3'; Harrison 19'; Merry 48'	Report	Morgan 32'; Peris 54'	Stadium: North Harbour Hockey Stadium

==== International Festival of Hockey ====
23 November 2016 Test Match	Australia	0–1	India	Melbourne, Australia
18:00		Report	Rampal 21'	Stadium: State Netball and Hockey Centre

25 November 2016 Test Match	India	1–4	Australia	Melbourne, Australia
19:00	Rampal 27'	Report	Slattery 8'; Nanscawen 26'; Fey 29'; Bone 51'	Stadium: State Netball and Hockey Centre

27 November 2016 Test Match	Australia	3–1	India	Melbourne, Australia
14:00	Peris 39'; Nance 41'; Holzberger 58'	Report	Katariya 17'	Stadium: State Netball and Hockey Centre

=== 2017 Results ===
Year	Pld	W	D	L	GF	GA	GD	Pts
2017 Statistics	24	15	4	5	77	26	+51	49

==== Hawke's Bay Cup ====
31 March 2017 Group Stage	Australia	1–1	United States	Hastings, New Zealand
16:00	Ratcliffe 32'	Report	Parker 8'	Stadium: Hawke's Bay Sports Park

1 April 2017 Group Stage	Australia	1–1	New Zealand	Hastings, New Zealand
17:00	Barden 9'	Report	Harrison 59'	Stadium: Hawke's Bay Sports Park

3 April 2017 Group Stage	Australia	2–1	Japan	Hastings, New Zealand
16:00	Holzberger 9'; Ratcliffe 11'	Report	Hazuki 46'	Stadium: Hawke's Bay Sports Park

4 April 2017 Group Stage	Australia	3–1	United States	Hastings, New Zealand
16:00	Claxton 7'; Smith 48'; Fey 50'	Report	Sharkey 43'	Stadium: Hawke's Bay Sports Park

6 April 2017 Group Stage	Australia	1–1	New Zealand	Hastings, New Zealand
17:30	Ratcliffe 29'	Report	Harrison 51'	Stadium: Hawke's Bay Sports Park

8 April 2017 Group Stage	Australia	0–2	Japan	Hastings, New Zealand
15:00		Report	Nagai 6', 42'	Stadium: Hawke's Bay Sports Park

9 April 2017 Bronze Medal Match	Australia	1–1 (3–2 p)	United States	Hastings, New Zealand
15:00	Hanna 29'	Report	van Sickle 59'	Stadium: Hawke's Bay Sports Park
	Penalties
	Ratcliffe (penalty shoot-out scored); Nance (penalty shoot-out scored); Kershaw (penalty shoot-out missed); Bates (penalty shoot-out scored)		(penalty shoot-out missed) Gonzalez; (penalty shoot-out missed) Vittese; (penalty shoot-out scored) Matson; (penalty shoot-out scored) Sharkey; (penalty shoot-out missed) West

==== Hockey World League Semifinals ====
21 June 2017 Group Stage	Australia	3–0	Malaysia	Brussels, Belgium
16:00	Fitzpatrick 4', 44'; Morgan 59'	Report

22 June 2017 Group Stage	Belgium	0–1	Australia	Brussels, Belgium
20:00		Report	Morgan 12'

24 June 2017 Group Stage	New Zealand	2–0	Australia	Brussels, Belgium
14:00	Neal 15', 57'	Report

25 June 2017 Group Stage	Australia	4–1	Spain	Brussels, Belgium
14:00	Slattery 28', 38'; Morgan 45+'; Smith 51'	Report	Jiménez 33'

29 June 2017 Quarterfinals	Australia	0–2	China	Brussels, Belgium
15:30		Report	Wu 32'; Liang 54'

1 July 2017 5/8 Crossover	Belgium	1–5	Australia	Brussels, Belgium
13:30	Versavel 37'	Report	Slattery 4'; Fitzpatrick 19'; Morgan 24'; Ratcliffe 35'; Smith 53'

2 July 2017 5th Place Match	Italy	1–3	Australia	Brussels, Belgium
13:30	Carta 11'	Report	Slattery 22'; Morgan 48'; Ratcliffe 55'

==== Oceania Cup ====
12 October 2017 Group Stage	Australia	23–0	Papua New Guinea	Sydney, Australia
18:00	Taylor 2', 60'; Stewart 3', 23', 33'; Slattery 4', 16', 17', 45', 48'; Nance 6', 11'; Smith 9', 29', 37', 43', 47'; Peris 31'; Fitzpatrick 34', 53'; Nobbs 44'; Bates 57'; Hanna 59'	Report		Stadium: Sydney Olympic Park

14 October 2017 Group Stage	New Zealand	1–2	Australia	Sydney, Australia
17:00	Merry 53'	Report	Fitzpatrick 12'; Peris 22'	Stadium: Sydney Olympic Park

15 October 2017 Final	Australia	2–0	New Zealand	Sydney, Australia
15:00	Claxton 3'; Bates 30'	Report		Stadium: Sydney Olympic Park

==== International Festival of Hockey ====
8 November 2017 Group Stage	Australia	0–2	Netherlands	Melbourne, Australia
19:30		Report	van Maasakker 8'; Krekelaar 36'	Stadium: State Netball and Hockey Centre

9 November 2017 Group Stage	Australia	3–2	United States	Melbourne, Australia
19:30	Claxton 37'; Peris 50'; Hurtz 54'	Report	Gonzalez 8'; Di Nardo 15'	Stadium: State Netball and Hockey Centre

11 November 2017 Group Stage	Australia	2–3	Japan	Melbourne, Australia
17:00	S. Fitzpatrick 4', 54'	Report	Y. Nagai 3'; Nomura 18', 56'	Stadium: State Netball and Hockey Centre

12 November 2017 Bronze Medal Match	Australia	5–0	United States	Melbourne, Australia
13:15	Ratcliffe 29'; Peris 31', 38'; Smith 32'; Kershaw 40'	Report		Stadium: State Netball and Hockey Centre

==== Japan Test Series ====
15 November 2017 Test Match	Australia	5–1	Japan	Adelaide, Australia
19:00	S. Fitzpatrick 6'; Stewart 14'; M. Fitzpatrick 17', 54'; Hurtz 43'	Report	Shimizu 56'	Stadium: State Hockey Centre

16 November 2017 Test Match	Australia	2–1	Japan	Adelaide, Australia
19:00	Ratcliffe 5'; Slattery 25'	Report	Tsujii 37'	Stadium: State Hockey Centre

18 November 2017 Test Match	Australia	8–1	Japan	Adelaide, Australia
14:00	Ratcliffe 4', 59'; Hurtz 10'; Nance 16'; M. Fitzpatrick 25'; Taylor 36'; S. Fitzpatrick 57'; Slattery 57'	Report	Mano 19'	Stadium: State Hockey Centre

=== 2018 Results ===
Year	Pld	W	D	L	GF	GA	GD	Pts
2018 Statistics	27	12	9	6	42	31	+11	45

==== Spain Test Series ====
16 January 2018 Test Match	Australia	1–1	Spain	Guildford, Australia
18:30 (AWST)	Nance 35'	Report	Salvatella 37'	Stadium: Guildford Grammar School

18 January 2018 Test Match	Australia	1–1	Spain	Warwick, Australia
18:30 (AWST)	Stewart 10'	Report	Iglesias 12'	Stadium: Warwick Hockey Stadium

20 January 2018 Test Match	Australia	3–2	Spain	Perth, Australia
18:30 (AWST)	Holzberger 17'; Kenny 20'; McMahon 36'	Report	Riera 18'; Bonastre 24'	Stadium: Perth Hockey Stadium

21 January 2018 Test Match	Australia	0–0	Spain	Warwick, Australia
18:30 (AWST)		Report		Stadium: Warwick Hockey Stadium

==== China Practice Matches ====
4 February 2018 Practice Match	Australia	1–3	China	Perth, Australia
18:00 (AWST)	Kenny 50'	Report	Peng 3'; Xi 9'; Song 24'	Stadium: Hale Hockey Club

5 February 2018 Practice Match	Australia	5–0	China	Perth, Australia
16:30 (AWST)	Smith 9'; Taylor 10'; Fey 17'; Ratcliffe 26'; Hurtz 56'	Report		Stadium: Hale Hockey Club

7 February 2018 Practice Match	Australia	1–1	China	Perth, Australia
18:00 (AWST)	Fey 23'	Report	Zhong M. 7'	Stadium: UWA Hockey Club

9 February 2018 Practice Match	Australia	4–1	China	Guildford, Australia
18:00 (AWST)	Slattery 5', 6'; Smith 26'; Nance 54'	Report	Luo 33'	Stadium: Guildford Grammar School

10 February 2018 Practice Match	Australia	4–2	China	Guildford, Australia
18:00 (AWST)	Ratcliffe 17'; Nance 57'; Kershaw 62'; S. Fitzpatrick 66'	Report	Peng 3'; Gu 59'	Stadium: Guildford Grammar School

==== XXI Commonwealth Games ====
5 April 2018 Group Stage	Australia	1–0	Canada	Gold Coast, Australia
16:30 (AEST)	Kenny 26'	Report		Stadium: Gold Coast Hockey Centre

7 April 2018 Group Stage	Australia	5–0	Ghana	Gold Coast, Australia
21:30 (AEST)	Bone 2'; Kenny 7', 30'; Claxton 14'; Peris 41'	Report		Stadium: Gold Coast Hockey Centre

9 April 2018 Group Stage	Australia	0–0	New Zealand	Gold Coast, Australia
21:30 (AEST)		Report		Stadium: Gold Coast Hockey Centre

10 April 2018 Group Stage	Australia	2–0	Scotland	Gold Coast, Australia
21:30 (AEST)	Kenny 12'; Stewart 41'	Report		Stadium: Gold Coast Hockey Centre

12 April 2018 Semi-final	Australia	1–0	India	Gold Coast, Australia
21:15 (AEST)	Stewart 37'	Report		Stadium: Gold Coast Hockey Centre

14 April 2018 Final	New Zealand	4–1	Australia	Gold Coast, Australia
12:45 (AEST)	Gloyn 28'; Keddell 34'; Merry 42'; McLaren 56'	Report	Kenny 50'	Stadium: Gold Coast Hockey Centre

==== Tri-Nations Hockey Tournament ====
20 May 2018 Group Stage	Australia	4–1	New Zealand	Cromwell, New Zealand
14:30	Kenny 2'; Peris 27'; Brazel 41'; Commerford 57'	Report	Merry 8'	Stadium: Central Otago Sports Club

21 May 2018 Group Stage	Japan	1–4	Australia	Cromwell, New Zealand
18:30	Oikawa 14'	Report	Malone 1'; Commerford 30'; Peris 32'; Taylor 36'	Stadium: Central Otago Sports Club

23 May 2018 Group Stage	Australia	3–0	New Zealand	Cromwell, New Zealand
18:30	Fitzpatrick 14'; Malone 40'; Kershaw 57'	Report		Stadium: Central Otago Sports Club

24 May 2018 Group Stage	Japan	1–0	Australia	Cromwell, New Zealand
18:30	Mori 23'	Report		Stadium: Central Otago Sports Club

27 May 2018 Final	New Zealand	1–4	Australia	Cromwell, New Zealand
14:30	Harrison 19'	Report	Kenny 8'; Malone 30'; Hurtz 35'; Peris 45'	Stadium: Central Otago Sports Club

==== Hockey World Cup ====
21 July 2018 Pool D	Australia	3–2	Japan	London, England
20:00 (UTC+1:00)	Malone 17'; Hurtz 22'; Kenny 35'	Report	Kawamura 36'; Kato 60'	Stadium: Lee Valley Hockey and Tennis Centre

24 July 2018 Pool D	Australia	0–0	Belgium	London, England
14:00 (UTC+1:00)		Report		Stadium: Lee Valley Hockey and Tennis Centre

28 July 2018 Pool D	New Zealand	1–1	Australia	London, England
20:00 (UTC+1:00)	Merry 13'	Report	Smith 18'	Stadium: Lee Valley Hockey and Tennis Centre

1 August 2018 Quarterfinal	Australia	0–0 (4–3 p)	Argentina	London, England
20:15 (UTC+1:00)		Report		Stadium: Lee Valley Hockey and Tennis Centre
	Penalties
	Peris (penalty shoot-out missed); Bates (penalty shoot-out scored); Fitzpatrick (penalty shoot-out missed); Malone (penalty shoot-out scored); McMahon (penalty shoot-out scored); Bates (penalty shoot-out missed); Peris (penalty shoot-out scored)		(penalty shoot-out missed) Merino; (penalty shoot-out scored) Von der Heyde; (penalty shoot-out scored) Albertario; (penalty shoot-out scored) Gomes Fantasia; (penalty shoot-out missed) Fernández Ladra; (penalty shoot-out missed) Albertario; (penalty shoot-out missed) Merino

4 August 2018 Semi-final	Netherlands	1–1 (3–1 p)	Australia	London, England
16:30 (UTC+1:00)	Jonker 22'	Report	Morgan 54'	Stadium: Lee Valley Hockey and Tennis Centre
	Penalties
	Matla (penalty shoot-out scored); Dirkse van den Heuvel (penalty shoot-out missed); Van Geffen (penalty shoot-out missed); De Waard (penalty shoot-out scored); Welten (penalty shoot-out scored)		(penalty shoot-out scored) Bates; (penalty shoot-out missed) Peris; (penalty shoot-out missed) Nobbs; (penalty shoot-out missed) McMahon

5 August 2018 Bronze Medal Match	Australia	1–3	Spain	London, England
14:00 (UTC+1:00)	Slattery 40'	Report	López 11'; Bonastre 14'; Magaz 51'	Stadium: Lee Valley Hockey and Tennis Centre

==== Hockey Champions Trophy ====
17 November 2018 Pool Match	Australia	2–1	Argentina	Changzhou, China
20:00 (UTC+8:00)	Malone 12', 15'	Report	Granatto 33'	Stadium: Wujin Hockey Stadium

18 November 2018 Pool Match	Australia	2–0	Great Britain	Changzhou, China
14:00 (UTC+8:00)	Peris 9'; Commerford 29'	Report		Stadium: Wujin Hockey Stadium

20 November 2018 Pool Match	Australia	0–3	Netherlands	Changzhou, China
14:00 (UTC+8:00)		Report	Veen 21'; Van Maasakker 28'; Zerbo 46'	Stadium: Wujin Hockey Stadium

22 November 2018 Pool Match	China	0–0	Australia	Changzhou, China
16:00 (UTC+8:00)		Report		Stadium: Wujin Hockey Stadium

24 November 2018 Pool Match	Japan	3–1	Australia	Changzhou, China
14:00 (UTC+8:00)	Y. Nagai 3'; Mano 8'; Shimizu 45'	Report	Squibb 54'	Stadium: Wujin Hockey Stadium

25 November 2018 Final	Netherlands	5–1	Australia	Changzhou, China
18:30 (UTC+8:00)	De Waard 7'; De Goede 11'; Stam 43'; Kerstholt 53'; Verschoor 56'	Report	Fitzpatrick 40'	Stadium: Wujin Hockey Stadium

=== 2019 Results ===
Team	Pld	W	WD	LD	L	GF	GA	GD	Pts
2019 Statistics	27	13	2	5	7	61	42	+19	48

==== FIH Pro League ====
2 February 2019 Group Stage	Australia	1–0	Netherlands	Melbourne, Australia
17:00	Claxton 21'	Report		Stadium: State Netball and Hockey Centre

3 February 2019 Group Stage	Australia	1–2	Belgium	Melbourne, Australia
17:00	Peris 57'	Report	Struijk 37'; Versavel 47'	Stadium: State Netball and Hockey Centre

9 February 2019 Group Stage	Australia	4–3	China	Hobart, Australia
17:00	Williams 13'; Malone 28'; Stewart 48'; S. Fitzpatrick 50'	Report	Zhong J. 25'; Dan 29'; Yong 56'	Stadium: Tasmanian Hockey Centre

10 February 2019 Group Stage	Australia	2–2 (3–1 p)	Germany	Hobart, Australia
17:00	S. Taylor 9'; Stewart 32'	Report	Granitzki 22', 47'	Stadium: Tasmanian Hockey Centre
	Penalties
	Bone (penalty shoot-out scored); Peris (penalty shoot-out scored); Williams (penalty shoot-out scored)		(penalty shoot-out scored) Lorenz; (penalty shoot-out missed) Gräve; (penalty shoot-out missed) Hauke; (penalty shoot-out missed) Pieper

16 February 2019 Group Stage	Australia	3–0	Great Britain	Perth, Australia
17:00	Commerford 15'; Williams 23'; S. Fitzpatrick 50'	Report		Stadium: Perth Hockey Stadium

2 March 2019 Group Stage	Australia	2–1	United States	Sydney, Australia
17:00	Kenny 46'; Williams 52'	Report	Grega 7'	Stadium: Sydney Olympic Park

16 March 2019 Group Stage	Australia	0–1	Argentina	Sydney, Australia
17:00		Report	Merino 24'	Stadium: Sydney Olympic Park

17 March 2019 Group Stage	Australia	1–3	New Zealand	Sydney, Australia
17:00	S. Fitzpatrick 48'	Report	Merry 17', 32'; Robinson 52'	Stadium: Sydney Olympic Park

25 April 2019 Group Stage	New Zealand	1–5	Australia	Auckland, New Zealand
14:30	Ritchie 30'	Report	Nobbs 2'; Chalker 21'; S. Fitzpatrick 31'; Stewart 53', 58'	Stadium: North Harbour Hockey Stadium

4 May 2019 Group Stage	Argentina	1–1 (3–1 p)	Australia	Buenos Aires, Argentina
16:00	D'Elía 18'	Report	M. Fitzpatrick 2'	Stadium: CeNARD
	Penalties
	D'Elía (penalty shoot-out scored); Von der Heyde (penalty shoot-out missed); Alonso (penalty shoot-out missed); Rebecchi (penalty shoot-out scored); Jankunas (penalty shoot-out scored)		(penalty shoot-out missed) Bone; (penalty shoot-out scored) Bates; (penalty shoot-out missed) Peris; (penalty shoot-out missed) Nobbs

10 May 2019 Group Stage	United States	0–4	Australia	Lancaster, United States
19:00		Report	Malone 19'; S. Fitzpatrick 50', 51'; Chalker 58'	Stadium: Spooky Nook Sports

2 June 2019 Group Stage	China	2–3	Australia	Changzhou, China
16:00	Chen 14'; Xu 59'	Report	M. Fitzpatrick 45'; Chalker 49'; Malone 56'	Stadium: Wujin Hockey Stadium

9 June 2019 Group Stage	Great Britain	2–4	Australia	London, United Kingdom
16:00	Pearne-Webb 43'; Howard 53'	Report	M. Fitzpatrick 18'; Peris 18'; Claxton 23'; Williams 37'	Stadium: Lee Valley Hockey and Tennis Centre

16 June 2019 Group Stage	Germany	1–3	Australia	Krefeld, Germany
12:00	Gablać 32'	Report	Claxton 2', 3'; Chalker 21'	Stadium: Crefelder Hockey und Tennis Club

19 June 2019 Group Stage	Belgium	1–0	Australia	Antwerp, Belgium
18:30	Ballenghien 54'	Report		Stadium: Wilrijkse Plein Antwerp

23 June 2019 Group Stage	Netherlands	3–1	Australia	Amstelveen, Netherlands
15:00	Van den Assem 13'; Leurink 51'; Verschoor 54'	Report	Chalker 57'	Stadium: Wagener Stadium

27 June 2019 Semi-final	Argentina	1–1 (3–4 p)	Australia	Amstelveen, Netherlands
17:15	Jankunas 4'	Report	Kenny 29'	Stadium: Wagener Stadium
	Penalties
	Rebecchi (penalty shoot-out missed); D'Elía (penalty shoot-out scored); Albertario (penalty shoot-out scored); Jankunas (penalty shoot-out scored); Di Santo (penalty shoot-out missed); D'Elía (penalty shoot-out missed)		(penalty shoot-out scored) Malone; (penalty shoot-out scored) Nobbs; (penalty shoot-out missed) Kenny; (penalty shoot-out missed) Peris; (penalty shoot-out scored) Williams; (penalty shoot-out scored) Malone

29 June 2019 Final	Netherlands	2–2 (4–3 p)	Australia	Amstelveen, Netherlands
17:00	Veen 24'; Jonker 49'	Report	Williams 19'; Nobbs 58'	Stadium: Wagener Stadium
	Penalties
	Keetels (penalty shoot-out scored); De Waard (penalty shoot-out scored); Verschoor (penalty shoot-out scored); Veen (penalty shoot-out missed); Stam (penalty shoot-out scored)		(penalty shoot-out scored) Nobbs; (penalty shoot-out scored) Malone; (penalty shoot-out missed) Fitzpatrick; (penalty shoot-out scored) Williams; (penalty shoot-out missed) Peris

==== Ready Steady Tokyo ====
17 August 2019 Match 1	Australia	2–3	China	Tokyo, Japan
12:15	Fitzpatrick 56'; Malone 57'	Report	Gu 5'; Luo 22'; Zhong 38'

18 August 2019 Match 2	India	2–2	Australia	Tokyo, Japan
09:30	Vandana 36'; Gurjit 59'	Report	Nobbs 14'; Stewart 43'

20 August 2019 Match 3	Australia	2–2	Japan	Tokyo, Japan
17:30	Lawton 34'; Commerford 54'	Report	Mitsuhashi 26'; Nomura 32'

21 August 2019 Bronze Medal Match	China	1–3	Australia	Tokyo, Japan
17:30	Li J. 57'	Report	Commerford 11'; Malone 16'; Fitzpatrick 34'

==== Oceania Cup ====
5 September 2019 Match 1	Australia	1–3	New Zealand	Rockhampton, Australia
18:00	Lawton 54'	Report	Hull 20'; Robinson 42'; Michelsen 43'	Stadium: Kalka Shades Hockey Fields

7 September 2019 Match 2	Australia	3–2	New Zealand	Rockhampton, Australia
16:00	M. Fitzpatrick 5'; Peris 43'; R. Taylor 60'	Report	Merry 15'; Gunson 47'	Stadium: Kalka Shades Hockey Fields

8 September 2019 Match 3	Australia	1–1	New Zealand	Rockhampton, Australia
16:00	Williams 2'	Report	Merry 55'	Stadium: Kalka Shades Hockey Fields

==== FIH Olympic Qualifiers ====
25 October 2019 Match 1	Australia	4–2	Russia	Perth, Australia
15:00 (AWST)	Chalker 1', 48'; Lawton 2'; Stewart 38'	Report	Sadovaia 8'; Khalimova 37'	Stadium: Perth Hockey Stadium

26 October 2019 Match 2	Australia	5–0	Russia	Perth, Australia
19:00 (AWST)	Stewart 9'; Williams 22', 30'; S. Taylor 25'; Chalker 27'	Report		Stadium: Perth Hockey Stadium

=== 2020 Results ===
Team	Pld	W	WD	LD	L	GF	GA	GD	Pts
2020 Statistics	5	1	1	1	2	6	9	−3	6

==== FIH Pro League ====
25 January 2020 Home 1	Australia	3–3 (4–2 p)	Belgium	Sydney, Australia
16:00	Malone 21'; Bone 59'; Commerford 60'	Report	Versavel 33'; Englebert 45'; Nelen 55'	Stadium: Sydney Olympic Park
	Penalties
	Peris (penalty shoot-out scored); Nobbs (penalty shoot-out missed); Malone (penalty shoot-out scored); Lawton (penalty shoot-out scored); Claxton (penalty shoot-out scored)		(penalty shoot-out missed) Ballenghien; (penalty shoot-out scored) Rasir; (penalty shoot-out scored) Raye; (penalty shoot-out missed) Englebert

26 January 2020 Home 2	Australia	1–1 (1–3 p)	Belgium	Sydney, Australia
15:00	Nance 45'	Report	Duquesne 47'	Stadium: Sydney Olympic Park
	Penalties
	Stewart (penalty shoot-out missed); Nance (penalty shoot-out missed); Kershaw (penalty shoot-out missed); Kenny (penalty shoot-out scored)		(penalty shoot-out scored) Versavel; (penalty shoot-out missed) Ballenghien; (penalty shoot-out missed) Raye; (penalty shoot-out scored) Duquesne; (penalty shoot-out scored) Nelen

1 February 2020 Home 3	Australia	2–1	Great Britain	Sydney, Australia
18:30	Kershaw 26'; Stewart 60'	Report	Robertson 18'	Stadium: Sydney Olympic Park

2 February 2020 Home 4	Australia	Cancelled	Great Britain	Sydney, Australia
17:30		Report	Toman 17'	Stadium: Sydney Olympic Park

6 March 2020 Home 5	Australia	0–2	Argentina	Perth, Australia
18:00		Report	Jankunas 14'; Gorzelany 48'	Stadium: Perth Hockey Stadium

7 March 2020 Home 6	Australia	0–2	Argentina	Perth, Australia
16:00		Report	V. Granatto 25'; Toccalino 59'	Stadium: Perth Hockey Stadium

Due to the ongoing worldwide COVID-19 pandemic, all international hockey has been postponed.
