= 2019 Women's Hockey One =

Hockey Australia's national league, inaugural season

2019 Women's Sultana Bran Hockey One
Tournament details
- Host country: Australia
- Dates: 29 September – 16 November
- Teams: 7
- Venue: 7 (in 7 host cities)

Final positions
- Champions: (Queensland) Brisbane Blaze (1st title)
- Runner-up: (Victoria (state)) HC Melbourne
- Third place: (South Australia) Adelaide Fire

Tournament statistics
- Matches played: 24
- Goals scored: 87 (3.63 per match)
- Top scorer: 4 Players (see list below) (6 goals)
- Best player: (Australian Capital Territory) Shihori Oikawa

The 2019 Women's Sultana Bran Hockey One was the inaugural women's edition of Hockey Australia's national league, Hockey One. The tournament was held across 7 states and territories of Australia. The tournament started on 29 September and culminated on 16 November 2019.

The grand final of the tournament was hosted by HC Melbourne, as the top ranked team to qualify for the final.

Brisbane Blaze won the tournament after defeating HC Melbourne 3–2 in a penalty shoot-out after the final finished as a 1–1 draw. Adelaide Fire finished in bronze position, following results from the pool stage.

== Competition format ==
=== Format ===
The 2019 Hockey One will follow a similar format to that of the final edition of the Australian Hockey League. Teams will play a series of home and away matches during the Pool Stage, which will be followed by a Classification Round.

During the pool stage, teams play each other once in either a home or a way fixture. The top four ranked teams will then qualify for the Classification Round, playing in two semi-finals with the winners contesting a grand final. Team 1 will host Team 4, while Team 2 will host Team 3. Of the two victorious teams, the higher ranked team from the pool stage will host the grand final.

=== Rules ===
In addition to FIH sanctioned rules, Hockey Australia is implementing the following rules for Hockey One:

- When a field goal or penalty stroke is scored the same athlete will have an automatic one-on-one shootout with the goalkeeper for an extra goal.
- Outright winner: There will be no drawn games. In the event of a draw, teams will contest a penalty shoot-out to determine a winner.

=== Point allocation ===
Match points will be distributed as follows:

- 5 points: win
- 3 points: shoot-out win
- 2 points: shoot-out loss
- 0 points: loss

== Participating teams ==
The seven teams competing in the league come from Australia's states and territories, with the Northern Territory being the only team absent.

(South Australia) Adelaide Fire

Head Coach: Melody Cooper

1. Linzi Appleyard
3. Brooklyn Buchecker
6. Jane Claxton
7. Emma de Broughe
8. Holly Evans (C)
9. Rachel McCann
12. Emily Grist
13. Sarah Harrison
14. Amy Hunt
15. Euleena MacLachlan
17. Karri McMahon
19. Gabrielle Nance
20. Harriet Shand
21. Michaela Spano
22. Leah Welstead
23. Gemma McCaw
24. Leah Butt
25. Kate Denning
28. Amy Hammond (GK)
30. Ashlee Wells (GK)
(Queensland) Brisbane Blaze

Head Coach: Nikki Taylor

1. Savannah Fitzpatrick
2. Madison Fitzpatrick
3. Layla Eleison
4. Ashlea Fey
5. Ambrosia Malone
6. Morgan Gallagher
7. Jodie Kenny (C)
8. Jordyn Holzberger
9. Jesse Reid
10. Madeline James
11. Ashlyn McBurnie
12. Kendra Fitzpatrick
13. Rebecca Greiner
14. Meg Pearce
15. Hannah Astbury (GK)
18. Dayle Dolkens
19. Morgan Mathison
20. Aleisha Neumann
21. Renee Taylor
22. Britt Wilkinson
23. Ruby Harris
24. Claire Colwill
25. Georgia Hillas
32. Emily Witheyman-Crump (GK)
(Australian Capital Territory) Canberra Chill

Head Coach: Ian Rutledge

1. Mikayla Evans
3. Brooke Peris
4. Jessica Smith
7. Naomi Evans
9. Samantha Economos
10. Rebecca Lee
11. Sophie Gaughan
12. Aleisha Price
13. Edwina Bone (C)
15. Yui Ishibashi
16. Shihori Oikawa
17. Beckie Middleton
18. Olivia Martin
19. Anna Flanagan
22. Taylor Thomson
23. Kalindi Commerford
25. Tina Taseska
27. Meredith Bone
31. Sakiyo Asano (GK)
32. Talei Forrest (GK)
(Victoria (state)) HC Melbourne

Head Coach: Tim Strapp

1. Sophie Taylor
2. Aisling Utri
3. Nicola Hammond
5. Kristina Bates
6. Claire Messent (C)
7. Kary Chau
8. Olivia Colasurdo
9. Lily Brazel
10. Laura Desmet
11. Takara Haines
12. Carly James
14. Laura Barden
20. Hayley Padget
21. Florine van Grimbergen
22. Madeleine Ratcliffe
23. Samantha Snow
25. Hannah Gravenall
27. Rachael Lynch (GK)
30. Nikki Bosman (GK)
33. Amy Lawton
(New South Wales) NSW Pride

Head Coach: Katrina Powell

2. Sarah Johnston
4. Emily Chalker
5. Jessica Parr (GK)
7. Grace Stewart
10. Greta Hayes
12. Mikaela Patterson
14. Kaitlin Nobbs
15. Emma Spinks
16. Jessica Watterson
17. Georgina Morgan
19. Morgan Blamey
20. Maddison Smith
21. Alice Arnott
22. Kate Jenner (C)
23. Abigail Wilson
24. Mariah Williams
27. Renee Robinson
28. Casey Sablowski
29. Courtney Schonell
30. Jocelyn Bartram (GK)
(Western Australia) Perth Thundersticks

Head Coach: Edward Welch

1. Phillipa Morgan
3. Candyce Peacock
4. Jemma Buckley (C)
6. Jacqui Day
7. Penny Squibb
8. Georgia Wilson
9. Shanea Tonkin
11. Rachel Frusher
12. Liné Malan
14. Roos Broek
15. Caitilin Pascov
16. Karri Somerville
17. Annie Gibbs
18. Renee Rockliff
19. Aleisha Power (GK)
20. Caitlin Cooper (GK)
21. Jade Vanderzwan
22. Jolie Sertorio
29. Agueda Moroni
30. Chloe Pendlebury
(Tasmania) Tassie Tigers

Head Coach: Luke Doerner

1. Sarah McCambridge
2. Amelia Spence (C)
3. Hannah Richardson
4. Nicole Geeves
5. Molly Haas
6. Jean Flanagan
7. Madeleine Hinton
8. Holly Bonde (GK)
9. Emily Donovan
10. Laura Spandler
11. Isabelle Sharman
12. Samantha Lawrence
13. Phillida Bridley
14. Jessica Chesterman
15. Sophie Rockefeller
19. Esmee Broekhuizen
20. Kateřina Laciná
21. Lauren Canning
22. Ruby-Rose Gibson-Haywood (GK)
23. Caashia Karringten

== Venues ==
Sydney	Melbourne	Perth
Sydney Olympic Park	State Netball and Hockey Centre	Perth Hockey Stadium
Capacity: 8,000	Capacity: 8,000	Capacity: 6,000
Adelaide	2019 Women's Hockey One is located in Australia	
State Hockey Centre	2019 Women's Hockey One is located in Australia	
Capacity: 4,000	2019 Women's Hockey One is located in Australia	
Brisbane	2019 Women's Hockey One is located in Australia	
Queensland State Hockey Centre	2019 Women's Hockey One is located in Australia	
Capacity: 1,000	2019 Women's Hockey One is located in Australia	
Canberra	2019 Women's Hockey One is located in Australia	
National Hockey Centre	2019 Women's Hockey One is located in Australia	
Hobart	2019 Women's Hockey One is located in Australia	
Tasmanian Hockey Centre	2019 Women's Hockey One is located in Australia	

== Results ==
=== Pool stage ===
Pos	Team	Pld	W	WD	LD	L	GF	GA	GD	Pts	Qualification
1	(Victoria (state)) HC Melbourne	6	5	0	1	0	19	6	+13	27	Semi-finals
2	(Queensland) Brisbane Blaze	6	4	0	1	1	16	5	+11	22	Semi-finals
3	(South Australia) Adelaide Fire	6	3	1	0	2	14	8	+6	18	Semi-finals
4	(Australian Capital Territory) Canberra Chill	6	2	1	1	2	7	11	−4	15	Semi-finals
5	(Western Australia) Perth Thundersticks	6	2	1	0	3	9	13	−4	13	
6	(New South Wales) NSW Pride	6	1	0	0	5	9	15	−6	5	
7	(Tasmania) Tassie Tigers	6	1	0	0	5	8	24	−16	5	

Source: Hockey Australia
Rules for classification: 1) points; 2) matches won; 3) goal difference; 4) goals for; 5) head-to-head result; 6) field goals scored.

==== Matches ====
29 September 2019
13:00 (AEST)

NSW Pride (New South Wales)	1–2	(South Australia) Adelaide Fire
Arnott 35'	Report	McMahon 34'; Spano 41'

Sydney Olympic Park, Sydney
Umpires:
Michelle Farnill (AUS)
Cassidy Gallagher (AUS)

29 September 2019
14:00 (AEST)

Canberra Chill (Australian Capital Territory)	2–2	(Queensland) Brisbane Blaze
N. Evans 53', 53'	Report	Malone 43', 43'
Penalties
E. Bone (penalty shoot-out scored); Middleton (penalty shoot-out missed); N. Evans (penalty shoot-out scored); Commerford (penalty shoot-out missed); Peris (penalty shoot-out scored)	3–2	(penalty shoot-out missed) Malone; (penalty shoot-out missed) S. Fitzpatrick; (penalty shoot-out scored) Holzberger; (penalty shoot-out scored) Fey; (penalty shoot-out missed) M. Fitzpatrick

National Hockey Centre, Canberra
Umpires:
Emily Carroll (AUS)
Kristy Robertson (AUS)

29 September 2019
16:30 (AWST)

Perth Thundersticks (Western Australia)	1–3	(Victoria (state)) HC Melbourne
Tonkin 26'	Report	Messent 5'; Ratcliffe 60', 60'

Perth Hockey Stadium, Perth
Umpires:
Tamara Leonard (AUS)
Kimberleigh Todd (AUS)

5 October 2019
14:00 (AEST)

Canberra Chill (Australian Capital Territory)	2–1	(New South Wales) NSW Pride
N. Evans 10'; M. Evans 29'	Report	Blamey 45'

National Hockey Centre, Canberra
Umpires:
Emily Carroll (AUS)
Michelle Farnill (AUS)

5 October 2019
17:00 (AEST)

Tassie Tigers (Tasmania)	0–4	(South Australia) Adelaide Fire
	Report	Spano 32', 56'; Nance 34'; De Broughe 43'

Tasmanian Hockey Centre, Hobart
Umpires:
Deborah O'Connell (AUS)
Tamara Leonard (AUS)

6 October 2019
13:00 (AEDT)

HC Melbourne (Victoria (state))	1–0	(Queensland) Brisbane Blaze
Desmet 23'	Report

State Netball and Hockey Centre, Melbourne
Umpires:
Nicola Brown (AUS)
Rhiannon Murrie (AUS)

12 October 2019
14:30 (AEDT)

NSW Pride (New South Wales)	5–0	(Tasmania) Tassie Tigers
Wilson 5', 5', 27', 60', 60'	Report

Sydney Olympic Park, Sydney
Umpires:
Cassidy Gallagher (AUS)
Kristy Robertson (AUS)

12 October 2019
15:30 (AWST)

Perth Thundersticks (Western Australia)	1–1	(Australian Capital Territory) Canberra Chill
Somerville 21'	Report	Oikawa 39'
Penalties
Broek (penalty shoot-out missed); Moroni (penalty shoot-out scored); Rockliff (penalty shoot-out missed); Pascov (penalty shoot-out missed); Tonkin (penalty shoot-out missed)	1–0	(penalty shoot-out missed) Taseska; (penalty shoot-out missed) Middleton; (penalty shoot-out missed) Evans; (penalty shoot-out missed) Balfour; (penalty shoot-out missed) Ishibashi

Perth Hockey Stadium, Perth
Umpires:
Melissa Trivic (AUS)
Kimberleigh Todd (AUS)

13 October 2019
13:00 (ACDT)

Adelaide Fire (South Australia)	2–4	(Queensland) Brisbane Blaze
Spano 34', 54'	Report	Harris 5'; Fey 21'; Wilkinson 44'; Eleison 50'

State Hockey Centre, Adelaide
Umpires:
Emily Carroll (AUS)
Nicola Brown (AUS)

18 October 2019
18:00 (AEST)

Brisbane Blaze (Queensland)	5–0	(Tasmania) Tassie Tigers
Harris 8'; Wilkinson 15', 15', 42'; Fey 38'	Report

Queensland State Hockey Centre, Brisbane
Umpires:
Emily Ogden (AUS)
Kerryl Chandler (AUS)

18 October 2019
19:00 (AEDT)

HC Melbourne (Victoria (state))	2–0	(Australian Capital Territory) Canberra Chill
Ratcliffe 30'; Gravenall 35'	Report

State Netball and Hockey Centre, Melbourne
Umpires:
Nicola Brown (AUS)
Rhiannon Murrie (AUS)

18 October 2019
19:00 (ACDT)

Adelaide Fire (South Australia)	1–2	(Western Australia) Perth Thundersticks
McCaw 42'	Report	Broek 51', 51'

State Hockey Centre, Adelaide
Umpires:
Tamara Leonard (AUS)
Kristy Robertson (AUS)

20 October 2019
13:00 (AEDT)

NSW Pride (New South Wales)	2–7	(Victoria (state)) HC Melbourne
Wilson 17'; Sablowski 60'	Report	Lawton 7'; Utri 28', 28'; Messent 30', 49'; Hammond 42'; Ratcliffe 56'

Sydney Olympic Park, Sydney
Umpires:
Cassidy Gallagher (AUS)
Michelle Farnill (AUS)

20 October 2019
13:00 (AEST)

Brisbane Blaze (Queensland)	3–0	(Western Australia) Perth Thundersticks
Fey 15+', 35'; Harris 43'	Report

Queensland State Hockey Centre, Brisbane
Umpires:
Kerryl Chandler (AUS)
Tamara Leonard (AUS)

20 October 2019
14:00 (AEDT)

Canberra Chill (Australian Capital Territory)	2–1	(Tasmania) Tassie Tigers
N. Evans 30', 30+'	Report	Canning 19'

National Hockey Centre, Canberra
Umpires:
Emily Carroll (AUS)
Kristy Robertson (AUS)

26 October 2019
14:00 (ACDT)

Adelaide Fire (South Australia)	4–0	(Australian Capital Territory) Canberra Chill
De Broughe 6'; Spano 23'; Nance 46'; Shand 60'	Report

State Hockey Centre, Adelaide
Umpires:
Emily Ogden (AUS)
Rhiannon Murrie (AUS)

26 October 2019
15:30 (AWST)

Perth Thundersticks (Western Australia)	2–0	(New South Wales) NSW Pride
Moroni 10'; Somerville 12'	Report

Perth Hockey Stadium, Perth
Umpires:
Melissa Trivic (AUS)
Kimberleigh Todd (AUS)

27 October 2019
15:30 (AEDT)

Tassie Tigers (Tasmania)	2–5	(Victoria (state)) HC Melbourne
Haas 51', 51'	Report	Gravenall 7', 7'; Desmet 33'; Ratcliffe 55', 60'

Tasmanian Hockey Centre, Hobart
Umpires:
Deborah O'Connell (AUS)
Kerryl Chandler (AUS)

2 November 2019
14:00 (AEDT)

Tassie Tigers (Tasmania)	5–3	(Western Australia) Perth Thundersticks
McCambridge 25'; Rockerfeller 29', 29'; Bridley 57', 57'	Report	Somerville 4'; Rockliff 47'; Van der Zwan 60+'

Tasmanian Hockey Centre, Hobart
Umpires:
Kerryl Chandler (AUS)
Michelle Farnill (AUS)

2 November 2019
15:00 (AEST)

Brisbane Blaze (Queensland)	2–0	(New South Wales) NSW Pride
Kenny 26'; M. Fitzpatrick 41'	Report

Queensland State Hockey Centre, Brisbane
Umpires:
Tamara Leonard (AUS)
Deborah O'Connell (AUS)

3 November 2019
14:45 (AEDT)

HC Melbourne (Victoria (state))	1–1	(South Australia) Adelaide Fire
Bates 60'	Report	McMahon 53'
Penalties
Bates (penalty shoot-out missed); Utri (penalty shoot-out scored); Gravenall (penalty shoot-out scored); Hammond (penalty shoot-out scored); Ratcliffe (penalty shoot-out missed)	3–4	(penalty shoot-out scored) Nance; (penalty shoot-out missed) Spano; (penalty shoot-out scored) Claxton; (penalty shoot-out scored) McMahon; (penalty shoot-out scored) De Broughe

State Netball and Hockey Centre, Melbourne
Umpires:
Nicola Brown (AUS)
Rhiannon Murrie (AUS)

=== Classification stage ===
Semi-finals
10 November – Melbourne
(Victoria (state)) HC Melbourne (p.s.o)	0 (1)
(Australian Capital Territory) Canberra Chill	0 (0)
9 November – Brisbane
(Queensland) Brisbane Blaze	3
(South Australia) Adelaide Fire	0

Grand Final
16 November – Melbourne
(Victoria (state)) HC Melbourne	1 (2)
(Queensland) Brisbane Blaze (p.s.o)	1 (3)

==== Semi-finals ====
9 November 2019
17:00 (AEST)

Brisbane Blaze (Queensland)	3–0	(South Australia) Adelaide Fire
K. Fitzpatrick 32'; Wilkinson 34'; M. Fitzpatrick 48'	Report

Queensland State Hockey Centre, Brisbane
Umpires:
Rhiannon Murrie (AUS)
Tamara Leonard (AUS)

10 November 2019
14:30 (AEDT)

HC Melbourne (Victoria (state))	0–0	(Australian Capital Territory) Canberra Chill
	Report
Penalties
Bates (penalty shoot-out missed); Utri (penalty shoot-out missed); Ratcliffe (penalty shoot-out scored); Lawton (penalty shoot-out missed)	1–0	(penalty shoot-out missed) Commerford; (penalty shoot-out missed) E. Bone; (penalty shoot-out missed) Taseska; (penalty shoot-out missed) N. Evans; (penalty shoot-out missed) Peris

State Netball and Hockey Centre, Melbourne
Umpires:
Nicola Brown (AUS)
Kristy Robertson

==== Grand final ====
16 November 2019
16:00 (AEDT)

HC Melbourne (Victoria (state))	1–1	(Queensland) Brisbane Blaze
Van Grimbergen 43'	Report	Wilkinson 37'
Penalties
Taylor (penalty shoot-out missed); Utri (penalty shoot-out missed); Barden (penalty shoot-out scored); Lawton (penalty shoot-out scored); Ratcliffe (penalty shoot-out missed) —— Ratcliffe (penalty shoot-out missed)	2–3	(penalty shoot-out scored) Fey; (penalty shoot-out missed) S. Fitzpatrick; (penalty shoot-out scored) Malone; (penalty shoot-out missed) Eleison; (penalty shoot-out missed) M. Fitzpatrick —— (penalty shoot-out scored) Malone

State Netball and Hockey Centre, Melbourne
Umpires:
Michelle Farnill (AUS)
Tamara Leonard (AUS)

== Awards ==
Top Goalscorer(s)	Player of the League	Player of the Final
4 Players (see list below)	(Australian Capital Territory) Shihori Oikawa	(Queensland) Ambrosia Malone

== Statistics ==
=== Final standings ===
Pos	Team	Pld	W	WD	LD	L	GF	GA	GD	Pts	Final standing
1st place, gold medalist(s)	(Queensland) Brisbane Blaze	8	5	1	1	1	20	6	+14	30	Gold Medal
2nd place, silver medalist(s)	(Victoria (state)) HC Melbourne	8	5	1	2	0	20	7	+13	32	Silver Medal
3rd place, bronze medalist(s)	(South Australia) Adelaide Fire	7	3	1	0	3	14	11	+3	18	Eliminated in Semi-finals
4	(Australian Capital Territory) Canberra Chill	7	2	1	2	2	7	11	−4	17	Eliminated in Semi-finals
5	(Western Australia) Perth Thundersticks	6	2	1	0	3	9	13	−4	13	Eliminated in Group Stage
6	(New South Wales) NSW Pride	6	1	0	0	5	9	15	−6	5	Eliminated in Group Stage
7	(Tasmania) Tassie Tigers	6	1	0	0	5	8	24	−16	5	Eliminated in Group Stage

Source: Hockey Australia

=== Goalscorers ===
There were 87 goals scored in 24 matches, for an average of 3.62 goals per match.

6 goals

- (South Australia) Michaela Spano
- (Queensland) Britt Wilkinson
- (Victoria (state)) Madeleine Ratcliffe
- (New South Wales) Abigail Wilson

5 goals

- (Australian Capital Territory) Naomi Evans

4 goals

- (Queensland) Ashlea Fey

3 goals

- (Queensland) Ruby Harris
- (Victoria (state)) Hannah Gravenall
- (Victoria (state)) Claire Messent
- (Western Australia) Karri Somerville

2 goals

- (South Australia) Emma de Broughe
- (South Australia) Karri McMahon
- (South Australia) Gabrielle Nance
- (Queensland) Madison Fitzpatrick
- (Queensland) Ambrosia Malone
- (Victoria (state)) Laura Desmet
- (Victoria (state)) Aisling Utri
- (Western Australia) Roos Broek
- (Tasmania) Phillida Bridley
- (Tasmania) Molly Haas
- (Tasmania) Sophie Rockerfeller

1 goal

- (South Australia) Gemma McCaw
- (South Australia) Harriet Shand
- (Queensland) Layla Eleison
- (Queensland) Kendra Fitzpatrick
- (Queensland) Jodie Kenny
- (Australian Capital Territory) Mikayla Evans
- (Australian Capital Territory) Shihori Oikawa
- (Victoria (state)) Kristina Bates
- (Victoria (state)) Nicola Hammond
- (Victoria (state)) Amy Lawton
- (Victoria (state)) Florine van Grimbergen
- (New South Wales) Alice Arnott
- (New South Wales) Morgan Blamey
- (New South Wales) Casey Sablowski
- (Western Australia) Agueda Moroni
- (Western Australia) Renee Rockliff
- (Western Australia) Shanea Tonkin
- (Western Australia) Jade van der Zwan
- (Tasmania) Lauren Canning
- (Tasmania) Sarah McCambridge

Source: Hockey Australia
