= 2021 Women's Trans-Tasman Hockey Series =

International field hockey competition

2021 Women's Trans–Tasman Hockey Series
Tournament details
- City: Palmerston North, New Zealand
- Dates: 27 May – 1 June
- Teams: 2 (from 1 confederation)
- Venue: Massey University

Final positions
- Champions: Australia
- Runner-up: New Zealand

Tournament statistics
- Matches played: 4
- Goals scored: 14 (3.5 per match)
- Top scorer(s): (Australia) Stephanie Kershaw (Australia) Ambrosia Malone (2 goals)

The 2021 Trans–Tasman Hockey Series was a field hockey series, comprising four test matches between the national teams of Australia and New Zealand. The series was held at Massey University in Palmerston North, from 27 May to 1 June.

Due to the ongoing impacts of the COVID-19 pandemic, the series was the first time the two teams played an international match since March 2020, in their respective FIH Pro League matches. The series was held simultaneously with a men's event.

== Squads ==
Australia

Head coach: Katrina Powell

1. Sophie Taylor
2. Ambrosia Malone
3. Brooke Peris
4. Amy Lawton
5. Ashlee Wells (GK)
6. Penny Squibb
7. Aleisha Power (GK)
8. Georgia Wilson
10. Madison Fitzpatrick
11. Meg Pearce
12. Greta Hayes
13. Edwina Bone
14. Stephanie Kershaw
15. Kaitlin Nobbs
16. Courtney Schonell
18. Jane Claxton
19. Jocelyn Bartram (GK)
20. Karri Somerville
21. Renee Taylor
22. Kate Jenner
23. Kalindi Commerford
24. Mariah Williams
26. Emily Chalker
27. Rachael Lynch (GK)
30. Grace Stewart
31. Laura Barden
32. Savannah Fitzpatrick
New Zealand

Head coach: (Republic of Ireland) Graham Shaw

1. Tarryn Davey (GK)
2. Olivia Shannon
4. Olivia Merry
5. Frances Davies
7. Kayla Whitelock
12. Elizabeth Gunson
13. Samantha Charlton
14. Tyler Lench
15. Grace O'Hanlon (GK)
16. Elizabeth Thompson
17. Stephanie Dickins
19. Tessa Jopp
20. Megan Hull
21. Alia Jaques
22. Katie Doar
24. Rose Keddell
25. Kelsey Smith
27. Holly Pearson
31. Stacey Michelsen (C)
33. Julia King
34. Hope Ralph
42. Georgia Barnett (GK)

== Results ==
All times are local (NZST).

=== Standings ===
Pos	Team	Pld	W	D	L	GF	GA	GD	Pts
1	Australia	4	1	3	0	8	6	+2	6
2	New Zealand (H)	4	0	3	1	6	8	−2	3

Source: Hockey New Zealand
Rules for classification: 1) points; 2) goal difference; 3) games won; 4) head-to-head result.
(H) Hosts

=== Fixtures ===
27 May 2021
19:30

New Zealand	1–1	Australia
Shannon 48'	Report	Malone 26'

Umpires:
Kelly Hudson (NZL)
Amber Church (NZL)

28 May 2021
19:30

New Zealand	2–2	Australia
Smith 11'; Dickins 35'	Report	Kershaw 38'; Williams 55'

Umpires:
Amber Church (NZL)
Kelly Hudson (NZL)

30 May 2021
13:00

New Zealand	2–2	Australia
King 23'; Gunson 41'	Report	M. Fitzpatrick 7'; Malone 58'

Umpires:
Kelly Hudson (NZL)
Amber Church (NZL)

1 June 2021
17:30

New Zealand	1–3	Australia
Merry 39'	Report	Kershaw 8'; Commerford 27'; S. Fitzpatrick 43'

Umpires:
Amber Church (NZL)
Kelly Hudson (NZL)

== Statistics ==
=== Goalscorers ===
There were 14 goals scored in 4 matches, for an average of 3.5 goals per match.

2 goals

- (Australia) Stephanie Kershaw
- (Australia) Ambrosia Malone

1 goal

- (Australia) Kalindi Commerford
- (Australia) Madison Fitzpatrick
- (Australia) Savannah Fitzpatrick
- (Australia) Mariah Williams
- (New Zealand) Stephanie Dickins
- (New Zealand) Elizabeth Gunson
- (New Zealand) Julia King
- (New Zealand) Olivia Merry
- (New Zealand) Olivia Shannon
- (New Zealand) Kelsey Smith

Source: FIH
