= 2017 Hawke's Bay Cup =

Tournament details
- Host country: New Zealand
- City: Hastings
- Dates: 31 March–9 April
- Teams: 4
- Venue(s): Hawke's Bay Sports Park

Final positions
- Champions: New Zealand (2nd title)
- Runner-up: Japan
- Third place: Australia

Tournament statistics
- Matches played: 14
- Goals scored: 40 (2.86 per match)
- Top scorer(s): (Australia) Madi Ratcliffe (New Zealand) Samantha Harrison (3 goals)
- Best player: (United States) Michelle Vittese

The 2017 Hawke's Bay Cup was the 4th edition of the invitational Hawke's Bay Cup competition. It took place between 31 March–9 April 2017 in Hastings, New Zealand. A total of four teams competed for the title.

New Zealand won the tournament for the second time after defeating Japan 3–0 in the final. Australia won the third place match by defeating United States 3–1 in a penalty shoot-out following a 1–1 draw.

== Teams ==
Including New Zealand, 4 teams were invited by the New Zealand Hockey Federation to participate in the tournament.

- Australia
- Japan
- New Zealand
- United States

== Results ==
=== Pool ===
Pos	Team	Pld	W	D	L	GF	GA	GD	Pts	Qualification
1	New Zealand	6	3	2	1	9	7	+2	11	Final
2	Japan	6	3	0	3	8	9	−1	9	Final
3	Australia	6	2	3	1	8	7	+1	9	Third-place game
4	United States	6	1	1	4	10	12	−2	4	Third-place game

Source: hockeyfestival.nz
Rules for classification: 1) points; 2) games won; 3) games lost; 4) goal difference; 5) head-to-head result.

31 March 2017
16:00

Australia	1–1	United States
Ratcliffe 32'	Report	Parker 8'

Hawke's Bay Sports Park
Umpires:
Aleesha Unka (NZL)
Junko Wagatsuma (JPN)

31 March 2017
18:00

New Zealand	1–2	Japan
Neal 54'	Report	Kawamura 8'; Asai 58'

Hawke's Bay Sports Park
Umpires:
Mary Driscoll (USA)
Xiaoying Liu (CHN)

1 April 2017
15:00

United States	1–2	Japan
Dinunzio 20'	Report	Kawamura 4'; Karino 24'

Hawke's Bay Sports Park
Umpires:
Kerryl Chanfdler (AUS)
Aleesha Unka (NZL)

1 April 2017
17:00

Australia	1–1	New Zealand
Barden 9'	Report	Harrison 59'

Hawke's Bay Sports Park
Umpires:
Xiaoying Liu (CHN)
Junko Wagatsuma (JPN)

3 April 2017
16:00

Australia	2–1	Japan
Holzberger 9'; Ratcliffe 11'	Report	Hazuki 46'

Hawke's Bay Sports Park
Umpires:
Mary Driscoll (USA)
Xiaoying Liu (CHN)

3 April 2017
18:00

New Zealand	3–2	United States
Robinson 12'; Harrison 25'; Smith 35'	Report	Matson 11'; Hoffman 47'

Hawke's Bay Sports Park
Umpires:
Junko Wagatsuma (JPN)
Kerryl Chandler (AUS)

4 April 2017
16:00

Australia	3–1	United States
Claxton 7'; Smith 48'; Fey 50'	Report	Sharkey 43'

Hawke's Bay Sports Park
Umpires:
Aleesha Unka (NZL)
Xiaoying Liu (CHN)

4 April 2017
18:00

New Zealand	1–0	Japan
Pearce 20'	Report

Hawke's Bay Sports Park
Umpires:
Mary Driscoll (USA)
Kerryl Chandler (AUS)

6 April 2017
15:30

United States	4–1	Japan
Parker 9'; Witmer 13'; Vittese 40'; Gonzalez 52'	Report	Mano 53'

Hawke's Bay Sports Park
Umpires:
Aleesha Unka (NZL)
Kerryl Chandler (AUS)

6 April 2017
17:30

Australia	1–1	New Zealand
Ratcliffe 29'	Report	Harrison 51'

Hawke's Bay Sports Park
Umpires:
Mary Driscoll (USA)
Junko Wagatsuma (JPN)

8 April 2017
15:00

Australia	0–2	Japan
	Report	Nagai 6', 42'

Hawke's Bay Sports Park
Umpires:
Aleesha Unka (NZL)
Mary Driscoll (USA)

8 April 2017
17:00

New Zealand	2–1	United States
Pearce 23'; Neal 28'	Report	Van Sickle 3'

Hawke's Bay Sports Park
Umpires:
Xiaoying Liu (CHN)
Junko Wagatsuma (JPN)

=== Classification ===
==== Third and fourth place ====
9 April 2017
15:00

Australia	1–1	United States
Hanna 29'	Report	Van Sickle 59'
Penalties
Ratcliffe (penalty shoot-out scored); Nance (penalty shoot-out scored); Kershaw (penalty shoot-out missed); Bates (penalty shoot-out scored)	3–2	(penalty shoot-out missed) Gonzalez; (penalty shoot-out missed) Vittese; (penalty shoot-out scored) Matson; (penalty shoot-out scored) Sharkey; (penalty shoot-out missed) West

Hawke's Bay Sports Park
Umpires:
Aleesha Unka (NZL)
Junko Wagatsuma (JPN)

==== Final ====
9 April 2017
17:15

New Zealand	3–0	Japan
McCann 5'; Keddell 57'; Merry 57'	Report

Hawke's Bay Sports Park
Umpires:
Xiaoying Liu (CHN)
Mary Driscoll (USA)

== Statistics ==
=== Final standings ===
1. New Zealand
2. Japan
3. Australia
4. United States

=== Goalscorers ===
3 goals

- (Australia) Madi Ratcliffe
- (New Zealand) Samantha Harrison

2 goals

- (Japan) Motomi Kawamura
- (Japan) Yuri Nagai
- (New Zealand) Brooke Neal
- (New Zealand) Kirsten Pearce
- (United States) Alyssa Parker
- (United States) Caitlin Van Sickle

1 goal

- (Australia) Laura Barden
- (Australia) Jane Claxton
- (Australia) Ashlea Fey
- (Australia) Kate Hanna
- (Australia) Jordyn Holzberger
- (Australia) Emily Smith
- (Japan) Yu Asai
- (Japan) Yudu Hazuki
- (Japan) Mami Karino
- (Japan) Yukari Mano
- (New Zealand) Kelsey Smith
- (New Zealand) Rose Keddell
- (New Zealand) Amy Robinson
- (New Zealand) Olivia Merry
- (New Zealand) Rachel McCann
- (United States) Amanda Dinunzio
- (United States) Melissa Gonzalez
- (United States) Ashley Hoffman
- (United States) Erin Matson
- (United States) Kathleen Sharkey
- (United States) Michelle Vittese
- (United States) Jill Witmer
