= 2019 Women's Ready Steady Tokyo Hockey Tournament =

Ready Steady Tokyo
Tournament details
- Host country: Japan
- City: Tokyo
- Dates: 17–21 August
- Teams: 4 (from 2 confederations)
- Venue: Oi Hockey Stadium

Final positions
- Champions: India
- Runner-up: Japan
- Third place: Australia

Tournament statistics
- Matches played: 8
- Goals scored: 26 (3.25 per match)
- Top scorer: (India) Gurjit Kaur (3 goals)

The 2019 Women's Ready Steady Tokyo Hockey Tournament was a women's field hockey tournament, consisting of a series of test matches. It was held in Tokyo, Japan, from August 17 to 21, 2019. The tournament served as a test event for the field hockey tournament at the 2020 Summer Olympics. The tournament featured four of the top nations in women's field hockey.

India won the tournament after defeating Japan 2–1 in the final. Australia finished in third place after defeating China 3–1 in the third place playoff.

== Competition format ==
The tournament featured the national teams of Australia, China, India, and the hosts, Japan, competing in a round-robin format, with each team playing each other once. Three points were awarded for a win, one for a draw, and none for a loss.

| Country | June 2019 FIH Ranking | Best World Cup finish | Best Olympic Games finish |
|---|---|---|---|
| Australia | 2 | Champions (1994, 1998) | Champions (1988, 1996, 2000) |
| China | 11 | Third Place (2002) | Runners-up (2008) |
| India | 10 | Fourth Place (1974) | Fourth Place (1980) |
| Japan | 14 | Fifth place (2006) | Eighth place (2004) |

== Results ==
=== Pool stage ===
| Pos | Team | Pld | W | D | L | GF | GA | GD | Pts | Qualification |
|---|---|---|---|---|---|---|---|---|---|---|
| 1 | India | 3 | 1 | 2 | 0 | 4 | 3 | +1 | 5 | Final |
| 2 | Japan (H) | 3 | 1 | 1 | 1 | 5 | 5 | 0 | 4 | Final |
| 3 | China | 3 | 1 | 1 | 1 | 4 | 4 | 0 | 4 | |
| 4 | Australia | 3 | 0 | 2 | 1 | 6 | 7 | −1 | 2 | |

Source: FIH
Rules for classification: 1) Points; 2) Goal difference; 3) Goals scored; 4) Games won; 5) Head-to-head.
(H) Hosts

17 August 2019
11:45

| India | 2–1 | Japan |
|---|---|---|
| Gurjit 9', 35' | Report | Nishikori 16' |

Umpires:
Aleisha Neumann (AUS)
Maggie Giddens (USA)

17 August 2019
12:15

| Australia | 2–3 | China |
|---|---|---|
| Fitzpatrick 56'; Malone 57' | Report | Gu 5'; Luo 22'; Zhong 38' |

Umpires:
Michelle Joubert (RSA)
Kelly Hudson (NZL)

18 August 2019
09:30

| India | 2–2 | Australia |
|---|---|---|
| Vandana 36'; Gurjit 59' | Report | Nobbs 14'; Stewart 43' |

Umpires:
Maggie Giddens (USA)
Emi Yamada (JPN)

18 August 2019
10:00

| China | 1–2 | Japan |
|---|---|---|
| Zhong 39' | Report | Y. Nagai 16'; Shimizu 47' |

Umpires:
Michelle Joubert (RSA)
Aleisha Neumann (AUS)

20 August 2019
17:30

| Australia | 2–2 | Japan |
|---|---|---|
| Lawton 34'; Commerford 54' | Report | Mitsuhashi 26'; Nomura 32' |

Umpires:
Michelle Joubert (RSA)
Maggie Giddens (USA)

20 August 2019
19:45

| China | 0–0 | India |
|---|---|---|
| | Report |

Umpires:
Kelly Hudson (NZL)
Emi Yamada (JPN)

=== Classification stage ===
==== Third and fourth place ====
21 August 2019
17:30

| China | 1–3 | Australia |
|---|---|---|
| Li J. 57' | Report | Commerford 11'; Malone 16'; Fitzpatrick 34' |

Umpires:
Maggie Giddens (USA)
Emi Yamada (JPN)

==== Final ====
21 August 2019
19:45

| India | 2–1 | Japan |
|---|---|---|
| Navjot 11'; Lalremsiami 33' | Report | Shimizu 12' |

Umpires:
Kelly Hudson (NZL)
Aleisha Neumann (AUS)

== Statistics ==
=== Final standings ===
As per statistical convention in field hockey, matches decided in extra time are counted as wins and losses, while matches decided by penalty shoot-outs are counted as draws.

| Pos | Team | Pld | W | D | L | GF | GA | GD | Pts | Final Result |
|---|---|---|---|---|---|---|---|---|---|---|
| 1st place, gold medalist(s) | India | 4 | 2 | 2 | 0 | 6 | 4 | +2 | 8 | Gold Medal |
| 2nd place, silver medalist(s) | Japan | 4 | 1 | 1 | 2 | 6 | 7 | −1 | 4 | Silver Medal |
| 3rd place, bronze medalist(s) | Australia | 4 | 1 | 2 | 1 | 9 | 8 | +1 | 5 | Bronze Medal |
| 4 | China | 4 | 1 | 1 | 2 | 5 | 7 | −2 | 4 | Fourth Place |

Source: FIH

=== Goalscorers ===
There were 26 goals scored in 8 matches, for an average of 3.25 goals per match.

3 goals

- (India) Gurjit Kaur

2 goals

- (Australia) Kalindi Commerford
- (Australia) Savannah Fitzpatrick
- (Australia) Ambrosia Malone
- (China) Zhong Jiaqi
- (Japan) Minami Shimizu

1 goal

- (Australia) Amy Lawton
- (Australia) Kaitlin Nobbs
- (Australia) Grace Stewart
- (China) Gu Bingfeng
- (China) Li Jiaqi
- (China) Luo Tiantian
- (India) Vandana Kataria
- (India) Navjot Kaur
- (India) Lalremsiami
- (Japan) Aki Mitsuhashi
- (Japan) Yuri Nagai
- (Japan) Kana Nomura
- (Japan) Emi Nishikori

Source: FIH
