= Hattie Shand =

Australian field hockey player

Personal information
- Full name: Harriet Ngaire Shand
- Born: 11 January 2000 (age 26) Naracoorte, South Australia, Australia

Sport
- Sport: Field hockey
- Position: Defence
Senior career
Years	Team	Caps	Goals
2017–2018	SA Suns	13	1
2019–	Adelaide Fire	7	1
National team
Years	Team	Caps	Goals
2018–2020	Australia U–21	11	(0)
2022–	Australia	33	(0)
Medal record
Women's field hockey
Representing Australia
World Cup
Bronze medal – third place	2022 Terrassa–Amsterdam	Team
Oceania Cup
Gold medal – first place	2023 Whangārei	Team
FIH Pro League
Bronze medal – third place	Season Four	Team

Harriet 'Hattie' Ngaire Shand (born 11 January 2000) is an Australian field hockey player, who plays as a defender.

== Personal life ==
Hattie Shand was born in Naracoorte, South Australia and grew up in Langkoop, Victoria near Apsley, Victoria. She attended Naracoorte Primary School and Naracoorte High School, she currently studies part-time at the University of Adelaide. She is of Australian and Maori heritage.

== Career ==
=== Achievements ===
Shand is a scholarship holder at the South Australian Sports Institute.

In 2021, she was awarded a Tier 3 Scholarship from the Sport Australia Hall of Fame.

=== Club hockey ===
Shand plays club hockey in South Australia's top level domestic competition, the Premier League. She is a member of the Adelaide Hockey Club.

=== Domestic hockey ===
In Hockey Australia's domestic competitions, Shand plays for her home state, South Australia. From 2017 to 2018, she was a member of the SA Suns team in the Australian Hockey League (AHL).

Following the dissolution of the AHL, Shand was named in the newly formed Adelaide Fire team for Hockey Australia's new premier competition, the Sultana Bran Hockey One. She went on to represent the team in the inaugural season in 2019, helping the team to a third place finish.

=== International hockey ===
==== Under–21 ====
In 2018, Shand made her debut for the Australia U–21 team during a test series against New Zealand in Hastings.

She followed this up with appearances during a Tri-Nations Tournament in 2019, as well as a test series against Japan in 2020, both held in Canberra.

==== Hockeyroos ====
In 2024, she joined the Australian Hockey team in the Olympics as a reserve
