= 2016 Women's International Hockey Open =

Tournament details
- Host country: Australia
- City: Darwin
- Dates: 31 May – 4 June 2016
- Teams: 4
- Venue(s): Marrara Hockey Centre

Final positions
- Champions: New Zealand (1st title)
- Runner-up: Australia
- Third place: Japan

Tournament statistics
- Matches played: 8
- Goals scored: 25 (3.13 per match)
- Top scorer(s): 6 players (2 goals)

The 2016 International Hockey Open was a women's field hockey tournament held at the Marrara Hockey Centre. It took place between 31 May – 4 June 2016 in Darwin, Australia. A total of four teams competed for the title.

New Zealand won the tournament by defeating Australia 2–0 in the final. Japan won the bronze medal by defeating India 2–1 in the third and fourth playoff.

== Participating nations ==
A total of four teams competed for the title:

- Australia
- India
- Japan
- New Zealand

== Results ==
=== Pool matches ===
| Pos | Team | Pld | W | D | L | GF | GA | GD | Pts | Qualification |
|---|---|---|---|---|---|---|---|---|---|---|
| 1 | Australia | 3 | 3 | 0 | 0 | 7 | 3 | +4 | 9 | Final |
| 2 | New Zealand | 3 | 2 | 0 | 1 | 7 | 4 | +3 | 6 | Final |
| 3 | Japan | 3 | 0 | 1 | 2 | 3 | 6 | −3 | 1 | Third and fourth place |
| 4 | India | 3 | 0 | 1 | 2 | 3 | 7 | −4 | 1 | Third and fourth place |

Source: FIH
Rules for classification: 1) points; 2) goal difference; 3) goals scored; 4) head-to-head result.

31 May 2016
17:00

| New Zealand | 4–1 | India |
|---|---|---|
| Hayward 18', 47'; McLaren 51'; Webster 53' | Report | Thokchom 58' |

Marrara Hockey Centre
Umpires:
Irene Presenqui (ARG)
Junko Wagatsuma (JPN)

31 May 2016
19:00

| Australia | 3–1 | Japan |
|---|---|---|
| Kenny 9'; White 18'; Nanscawen 38' | Report | Kawamura 22' |

Marrara Hockey Centre
Umpires:
Amber Church (NZL)
Nirmla Dagar (IND)

1 June 2016
17:00

| India | 1–1 | Japan |
|---|---|---|
| Poonam 7' | Report | H. Nagai 19' |

Marrara Hockey Centre
Umpires:
Amber Church (NZL)
Rhiannon Murrie (AUS)

1 June 2016
19:00

| Australia | 2–1 | New Zealand |
|---|---|---|
| Morgan 38'; Smith 46' | Report | Merry 21' |

Marrara Hockey Centre
Umpires:
Junko Wagatsuma (JPN)
Nirmla Dagar (IND)

3 June 2016
17:00

| Japan | 1–2 | New Zealand |
|---|---|---|
| Sakaguchi 58' | Report | Smith 28'; Webster 34' |

Marrara Hockey Centre
Umpires:
Nirmla Dagar (IND)
Rhiannon Murrie (AUS)

3 June 2016
19:00

| Australia | 2–1 | India |
|---|---|---|
| Stewart 9'; Smith 55' | Report | Minz 12' |

Marrara Hockey Centre
Umpires:
Amber Church (NZL)
Irene Presenqui (ARG)

=== Classification matches ===
==== Third and fourth place ====
4 June 2016
17:00

| Japan | 2–1 | India |
|---|---|---|
| Kawamura 38'; Shimizu 42' | Report | Katariya 37' |

Marrara Hockey Centre
Umpires:
Rhiannon Murrie (AUS)
Amber Church (NZL)

==== Final ====
4 June 2016
19:30

| Australia | 0–2 | New Zealand |
|---|---|---|
| | Report | Smith 24'; Merry 30' |

Marrara Hockey Centre
Umpires:
Junko Wagatsuma (JPN)
Irene Presenqui (ARG)

== Statistics ==
=== Final standings ===
| Pos | Team | Pld | W | D | L | GF | GA | GD | Pts | Final Result |
|---|---|---|---|---|---|---|---|---|---|---|
| 1st place, gold medalist(s) | New Zealand | 4 | 3 | 0 | 1 | 9 | 4 | +5 | 9 | Gold Medal |
| 2nd place, silver medalist(s) | Australia | 4 | 3 | 0 | 1 | 7 | 5 | +2 | 9 | Silver Medal |
| 3rd place, bronze medalist(s) | Japan | 4 | 1 | 1 | 2 | 5 | 7 | −2 | 4 | Bronze Medal |
| 4 | India | 4 | 0 | 1 | 3 | 4 | 9 | −5 | 1 | Fourth Place |

Source: FIH

=== Goalscorers ===
2 Goals

- (Australia) Emily Smith
- (Japan) Motomi Kawamura
- (New Zealand) Pippa Hayward
- (New Zealand) Olivia Merry
- (New Zealand) Kelsey Smith
- (New Zealand) Petrea Webster

1 Goal

- (Australia) Jodie Kenny
- (Australia) Georgina Morgan
- (Australia) Georgia Nanscawen
- (Australia) Grace Stewart
- (Australia) Kellie White
- (India) Vandana Katariya
- (India) Lilima Minz
- (India) Poonam Rani
- (India) Anuradha Thokchom
- (Japan) Hazuki Nagai
- (Japan) Maki Sakaguchi
- (Japan) Minami Shimizu
- (New Zealand) Anita McLaren

== See also ==
- Hockey Australia
- International Hockey Federation
