= Georgina Morgan =

Australian field hockey player

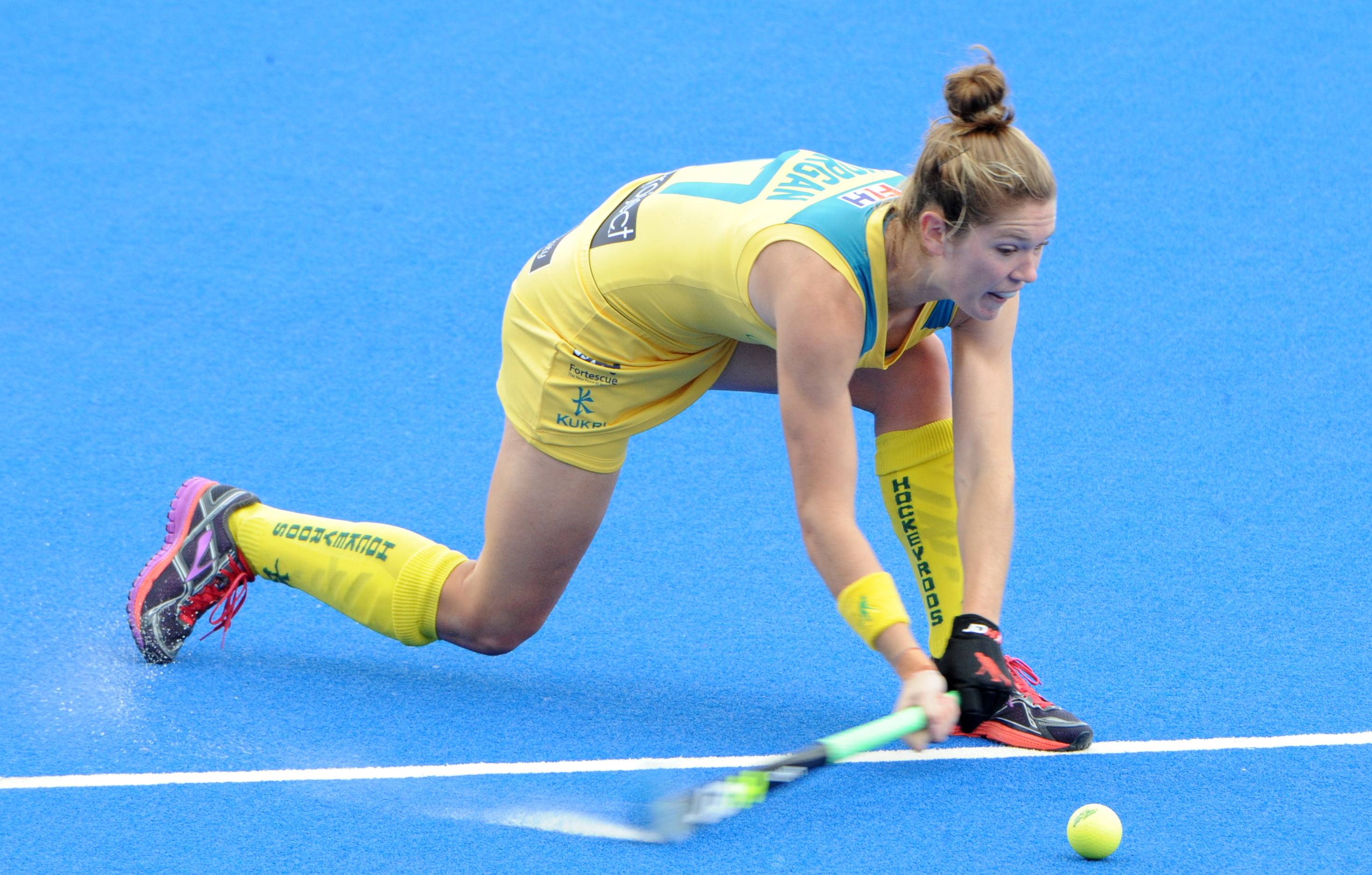

Personal information
- Born: 15 May 1993 (age 33) Armidale, NSW
- Height: 1.79 m (5 ft 10 in)
- Weight: 70 kg (154 lb)

Sport
- Sport: Field hockey
- Position: Defender
- Club: NSW Arrows
National team
Years	Team	Caps	Goals
2014–	Australia	92	(19)
Medal record
Women's field hockey
Representing Australia
FIH Pro League
Silver medal – second place	2019 Amstelveen	Team
Oceania Cup
Gold medal – first place	2015 Stratford	Team
Silver medal – second place	2019 Rockhampton	Team

Georgina Morgan (born 15 May 1993) is an Australian field hockey player.

She represented her country at the 2016 Summer Olympics in Rio de Janeiro.

== Early life ==
Morgan was born in Armidale, New South Wales. She began playing hockey when she was six years old.

== Education ==
Morgan is currently studying at the University of Sydney, completing a Bachelor of Applied Science, majoring in Exercise Physiology.

== Career ==
=== State hockey ===
As of 2018, Morgan represents her home state, New South Wales in the Australian Hockey League. Most recently winning a gold medal with the side in the 2018 edition of the event.

=== National team ===
Morgan made her senior international debut in 2014, in a test series against New Zealand, in Wellington, New Zealand.

In the Summer of 2018, Morgan spent time away from the national squad in Canberra, recovering from a toe injury she sustained in 2017. Morgan returned from injury to compete at the 2018 World Cup. Following this she sustained another injury, ruling her out of competition for the remainder of 2018.

Morgan returned to the national team in 2019 for the FIH Pro League where she won a silver medal.

==== International goals ====
Goal	Date	Location	Opponent	Score	Result	Competition	Ref.
1	22 October 2015	TET MultiSports Centre, Stratford, New Zealand	Samoa	17–0	23–0	2015 Oceania Cup	
2	5 December 2015	Estadio Mundialista Luciana Aymar, Rosario, Argentina	China	1–0	1–0	2014–15 HWL Final	
3	6 December 2015	Estadio Mundialista Luciana Aymar, Rosario, Argentina	Argentina	2–1	2–1	2014–15 HWL Final	
4	21 January 2016	Sengkang Hockey Stadium, Singapore	Germany	3–1	3–1	Test match	
5	21 February 2016	Perth Hockey Stadium, Perth, Australia	Great Britain	1–0	3–2	Test match	
6	5 April 2016	Hawke's Bay Sports Park, Hastings, New Zealand	Canada	1–0	4–0	2016 Hawke's Bay Cup	
7	10 April 2016	Hawke's Bay Sports Park, Hastings, New Zealand	China	2–0	3–1	2016 Hawke's Bay Cup	
8	1 June 2016	Marrara Hockey Centre, Darwin, Australia	New Zealand	1–1	2–1	2016 Int. Hockey Open	
9	6 August 2016	Olympic Hockey Centre, Rio de Janeiro, Brazil	Great Britain	1–1	1–2	2016 Olympic Games	
10	10 August 2016	Olympic Hockey Centre, Rio de Janeiro, Brazil	India	2–0	6–1	2016 Olympic Games	
11	17 November 2016	North Harbour Hockey Stadium, Auckland, New Zealand	New Zealand	3–0	6–0	2016 Trans-Tasman Trophy	
12	20 November 2016	North Harbour Hockey Stadium, Auckland, New Zealand	New Zealand	1–2	2–3	2016 Trans-Tasman Trophy	
13	21 June 2017	Stade Fallon, Brussels, Belgium	Malaysia	3–0	3–0	2016–17 HWL Semi-finals	
14	22 June 2017	Stade Fallon, Brussels, Belgium	Belgium	1–0	1–0	2016–17 HWL Semi-finals	
15	25 June 2017	Stade Fallon, Brussels, Belgium	Spain	3–1	4–1	2016–17 HWL Semi-finals	
16	1 July 2017	Stade Fallon, Brussels, Belgium	Belgium	3–0	5–1	2016–17 HWL Semi-finals	
17	2 July 2017	Stade Fallon, Brussels, Belgium	Italy	2–1	3–1	2016–17 HWL Semi-finals	
18	4 August 2018	Lee Valley Hockey and Tennis Centre, London, England	Netherlands	1–1	1–1 (1–3)	2018 World Cup	
19	15 September 2018	Ritsumeikan University, Osaka, Japan	United States	1–0	2–1	2018 SOMPO Cup	
