= Maki Sakaguchi =

Japanese field hockey player (born 1989)

Medal record

Women's field hockey

Representing Japan

Asian Champions Trophy
Bronze medal – third place	2016 Singapore	

Maki Sakaguchi (阪口 真紀, Sakaguchi Maki; born June 8, 1989) is a Japanese field hockey player. She competed for the Japan women's national field hockey team at the 2016 Summer Olympics.
