= Ambrosia Malone =

Australian field hockey player

Personal information
- Born: 8 January 1998 (age 28) Southport, Queensland, Australia

Sport
- Sport: Field hockey
- Position: Forward
- Club: Hockey Burleigh
National team
Years	Team	Caps	Goals
2018–2024	Australia	114	(33)
Medal record
Women's field hockey
Representing Australia
FIH World Cup
Bronze medal – third place	2022 Terrassa–Amstelveen	Team
FIH Pro League
Silver medal – second place	Season One	Team
Bronze medal – third place	Season Four	Team
Commonwealth Games
Silver medal – second place	2022 Birmingham	Team
Oceania Cup
Gold medal – first place	2023 Whangārei	Team
Silver medal – second place	2019 Rockhampton	Team
FIH Champions Trophy
Silver medal – second place	2018 Changzhou	Team
FIH Junior World Cup
Bronze medal – third place	2016 Santiago	Team

Ambrosia (Rosie) Malone (born 8 January 1998) is an Australian field hockey player.

== Personal life ==
Malone was born in Southport, Gold Coast, Queensland, and currently lives with her family on the Gold Coast.

=== Hockey ===
After representing Australia at junior level at the FIH 2016 Junior World Cup (bronze medal) Malone made her senior international debut in a test series against Spain in January 2018. Malone was permanently elevated into the Hockeyroos squad a few months later and was joint leading goal scorer in her first senior international tournament. Malone was nominated as an FIH Women's Rising Star later that same year.

Malone has been in the Hockeyroos ever since and has competed at two FIH World Cups, the Tokyo Olympic Games and the 2022 Commonwealth Games.

=== Education and career ===
Malone graduated from Trinity Lutheran College in 2015. During her school years Malone was highly regarded for her ambitious attitude and natural ability towards all sports.

In 2015 she was appointed Girl Captain of the entire Qld School Sport team (around 400 athletes) at the 2015 Pan Pacific Games. Malone was selected in both the School Sport Australia national hockey team (2013, 2014) and the national football team (2015). She also competed at the 2010 School Sport Australia Cross Country nationals, and in numerous Queensland School Sport track and field state championships during her school years in sprints, long-distance and hurdles events.

Her school results (including achieving dux of Physical Education) combined with her outstanding sports record saw her gain direct entry into Griffith University on a full scholarship. She graduated from Griffith University in 2019 with a BA Sport Development and currently works as a sports coordinator at a leading Queensland college when not competing.

=== Football ===
As a junior player, Malone also represented Australia internationally in football when selected in the 2010 Football Australia U13 Women's team which competed in the AFC Festival of Football in Vietnam. A natural left-footer, she was the only U12 player selected in the group and held down the left defender position. She was named in the Football Australia All Stars (national) junior teams for her age each subsequent year and in 2012, aged just U14, was the youngest player named in the Football Australia U17 Junior World Cup Squad.

In 2013 (aged U15) Malone was offered a place at the Queensland Academy of Sport (QAS) football program, however in accepting she was required to give up all other sporting activities including her school sport. She declined this offer, preferring to play a range of sports (including football) for both school and association teams, until selected for the Hockeyroos. She still enjoys playing football with friends whenever possible.

== International hockey career ==
=== Junior national team ===
Malone was part of the Australian women's junior national team 'The Jillaroos' that won bronze at the 2016 Hockey Junior World Cup in Chile.

=== Senior national team ===
In May 2018, Malone was officially raised into the Australian national squad. She scored her first international goal in May 2018, at the 2018 Women's Tri-Nations Hockey Tournament in New Zealand, in a match against Japan.

Malone qualified for the Tokyo 2020 Olympics by being selected in the final team of 16 in the Hockeyroos Olympics squad. Despite being undefeated throughout the pool matches, the Hockeyroos unexpectedly lost 1–0 to India in the quarterfinals and were out of medal contention.

During the 2022 Commonwealth Games semifinal match penalty shootout against India, a technological failure meant the eight-second count-down clock did not start when Malone began her shootout. Malone was distracted by the calls from technical bench officials to stop the shootout, but continued with her attempt as the on-field umpire had not heard the calls (or blown her whistle). Malone's shot was unsuccessful but because of the distraction and the fact that the eight-second clock had not been visible on the big screen for her first attempt, she was told she had to retake the attempt. This second attempt was successful, as were two of her teammates', and Australia won the shootout 3–0. Despite none of the errors being the fault of Malone, and despite the distraction she experienced as a result of hearing calls to stop from the tech bench, she was later criticised by Indian fans for retaking her attempt and helping her team qualify for the final.

==== International goals ====
Goal	Date	Location	Opponent	Score	Result	Competition	Ref.
1	21 May 2018	Central Otago Sports Club, Cromwell, New Zealand	Japan	1–0	4–1	2018 Tri-Nations Tournament	
2	23 May 2018	Central Otago Sports Club, Cromwell, New Zealand	New Zealand	2–0	3–0	2018 Tri-Nations Tournament	
3	27 May 2018	Central Otago Sports Club, Cromwell, New Zealand	New Zealand	2–1	4–1	2018 Tri-Nations Tournament	
4	21 July 2018	Lee Valley Hockey and Tennis Centre, London, United Kingdom	Japan	1–0	3–2	2018 FIH World Cup	
5	13 September 2018	Ritsumeikan University, Osaka, Japan	South Korea	2–1	3–1	2018 SOMPO Cup	
6	17 November 2018	Wujin Hockey Stadium, Changzhou, China	Argentina	1–0	2–1	2018 FIH Champions Trophy	
7	9 February 2019	Tasmanian Hockey Centre, Hobart, Australia	China	2–1	4–3	2019 FIH Pro League	
8	10 May 2019	Spooky Nook Sports, Lancaster, United States	United States	1–0	4–0	2019 FIH Pro League	
9	2 June 2019	Wujin Hockey Stadium, Changzhou, China	China	3–1	3–2	2019 FIH Pro League	
10	17 August 2019	Oi Hockey Stadium, Tokyo, Japan	China	2–3	2–3	2019 Olympic Test Event	
11	21 August 2019	Oi Hockey Stadium, Tokyo, Japan	China	2–3	3–1	2019 Olympic Test Event	
12	25 January 2020	Sydney Olympic Park Hockey Centre, Sydney, Australia	Belgium	1–0	3–3	2020–21 FIH Pro League	
13	27 May 2021	Massey University, Palmerston North, New Zealand	New Zealand	1–0	1–1	2021 Trans–Tasman Series	
14	30 May 2021	Massey University, Palmerston North, New Zealand	New Zealand	2–2	2–2	2021 Trans–Tasman Series	
15	27 June 2021	Perth Hockey Stadium, Perth, Australia	New Zealand	1–0	2–2	2020–21 FIH Pro League	
16	25 July 2021	Oi Hockey Stadium, Tokyo, Japan	Spain	1–0	3–1	2020 Olympic Games	
17	26 July 2021	Oi Hockey Stadium, Tokyo, Japan	China	4–0	6–0	2020 Olympic Games	
18	2 July 2022	Estadi Olímpic de Terrassa, Terrassa, Spain	Japan	2–0	2–0	2022 FIH World Cup	
19	6 July 2022	Estadi Olímpic de Terrassa, Terrassa, Spain	South Africa	2–1	2–1	2022 FIH World Cup	
20	7 August 2022	University of Birmingham, Birmingham, England	England	1–2	1–2	XXII Commonwealth Games	
21	10 February 2023	Sydney Olympic Park, Sydney, Australia	China	1–1	1–1	2022–23 FIH Pro League	
22	12 February 2023	Sydney Olympic Park, Sydney, Australia	Germany	1–0	3–0	2022–23 FIH Pro League	
23	12 February 2023	Sydney Olympic Park, Sydney, Australia	Germany	2–0	3–0	2022–23 FIH Pro League	
24	26 March 2023	Perth Hockey Stadium, Perth, Australia	China	3–3	3–4	Test Series	
25	8 June 2023	HC Oranje-Rood, Eindhoven, Netherlands	Netherlands	1–0	2–7	2022–23 FIH Pro League	
26	8 June 2023	HC Oranje-Rood, Eindhoven, Netherlands	Netherlands	2–4	2–7	2022–23 FIH Pro League	
27	11 June 2023	HC Oranje-Rood, Eindhoven, Netherlands	Netherlands	2–2	3–3	2022–23 FIH Pro League	
28	16 June 2023	Wilrijkse Plein, Antwerp, Belgium	Belgium	2–0	2–0	2022–23 FIH Pro League	
29	10 August 2023	ITM Hockey Centre, Whangārei, New Zealand	New Zealand	2–0	3–0	2023 Oceania Cup	
30	12 August 2023	ITM Hockey Centre, Whangārei, New Zealand	New Zealand	1–1	1–1	2023 Oceania Cup	
31	24 April 2024	Perth Hockey Stadium, Perth, Australia	China	1–1	2–3	2024 International Festival of Hockey	
32	28 April 2024	Perth Hockey Stadium, Perth, Australia	Japan	2–0	3–0	2024 International Festival of Hockey	

== Recognition ==
At just 20 years of age, and in her debut year for Australia, Malone was one of the five nominees for the 2018 FIH Women's Rising Star of the Year Award.
