= Gabrielle Nance =

Australian field hockey player

Personal information
- Born: 29 July 1994 (age 32)
- Height: 1.69 m (5 ft 7 in)
- Weight: 55 kg (121 lb)

Sport
- Sport: Field hockey
- Position: Forward
- Club: Adelaide Fire
Senior career
Years	Team	Caps	Goals
2014–2017	SA Suns	25	2
2019–	Adelaide Fire	7	2
National team
Years	Team	Caps	Goals
2014–	Australia	72	(8)
Medal record
Women's field hockey
Representing Australia
Commonwealth Games
Silver medal – second place	2018 Gold Coast	Team
Champions Trophy
Silver medal – second place	2014 Mendoza	Team
Oceania Cup
Gold medal – first place	2017 Sydney	Team

Gabrielle Nance (born 29 July 1994) is a field hockey player from Australia who plays as a forward.

== Personal life ==
Gabrielle Nance was born and raised in Kingscliff, New South Wales.

Nance relocated to Adelaide in 2014 to represent SA in national competitions.

== Career ==
=== Domestic leagues ===
==== Australian Hockey League ====
In the Australian Hockey League, Nance was a member of the SA Suns. She represented the team from 2014 to 2017.

==== Hockey One ====
In 2019, Nance was named in the Adelaide Fire squad for the inaugural tournament of Hockey Australia's new domestic league, Hockey One.

=== National team ===
Nance made her debut for the Hockeyroos in 2014 during a test series against New Zealand in Wellington. Following her debut, Nance won her first medal with Australia at the Champions Trophy in Mendoza; the team finished in second place, winning a silver medal.

In 2016, Nance represented her country at the Summer Olympics in Rio de Janeiro.

Following her silver medal-winning appearance at the 2018 Commonwealth Games on the Gold Coast, Nance made the decision to take a break from international hockey to reignite her passion for the game.

Nance returned to the national squad in 2020.

==== International goals ====
Goal	Date	Location	Opponent	Score	Result	Competition	Ref.
1	8 September 2015	Perth Hockey Stadium, Perth, Australia	South Korea	2–0	2–0	Test match	
2	16 February 2016	Perth Hockey Stadium, Perth, Australia	Great Britain	1–1	3–3	Test match	
3	27 November 2016	State Netball and Hockey Centre, Melbourne, Australia	India	2–1	3–1	Test match	
4	12 October 2017	Sydney Olympic Park, Sydney, Australia	PNG	4–0	23–0	2017 Oceania Cup	
5	12 October 2017	Sydney Olympic Park, Sydney, Australia	PNG	6–0	23–0	2017 Oceania Cup	
6	18 November 2017	State Hockey Centre, Adelaide, Australia	Japan	3–0	8–1	Test match	
7	16 January 2018	Perth Hockey Stadium, Perth, Australia	Spain	1–0	1–1	Test match	
8	26 January 2020	Sydney Olympic Park, Sydney, Australia	Belgium	1–0	1–1	2020 FIH Pro League	
