= Grace Stewart (field hockey) =

Australian field hockey player (born 1997)

Personal information
- Born: 28 April 1997 (age 29) Nowra, New South Wales, Australia
- Height: 175 cm (5 ft 9 in)
- Weight: 68 kg (150 lb)

Sport
- Sport: Field hockey
- Position: Forward
- Club: NSW Pride
National team
Years	Team	Caps	Goals
2016–	Australia	146	(40)
2016–2016	Australia U–21	6	(3)
Medal record
Representing Australia
World Cup
Bronze medal – third place	2022 Terrassa–Amstelveen	Team
Commonwealth Games
Silver medal – second place	2018 Gold Coast	Team
Silver medal – second place	2022 Birmingham	Team
FIH Pro League
Silver medal – second place	Season One	Team
Bronze medal – third place	Season Four	Team
Oceania Cup
Gold medal – first place	2017 Sydney
Gold medal – first place	2023 Whangārei
Silver medal – second place	2025 Darwin
Junior World Cup
Bronze medal – third place	2016 Santiago	Team

Grace Stewart (born 28 April 1997) is an Australian field hockey player.

== Personal life ==
Stewart was born in Nowra, and raised in Gerringong, a town in New South Wales, Australia.

== Career ==
=== Under–21 ===
She was a member of Australian Under 21 side, the 'Jillaroos', at the 2016 Junior World Cup. She scored three goals in the tournament, helping Australia to a bronze medal finish.

=== Hockeyroos ===
Stewart debuted for the Hockeyroos in 2016 in a three-nations series in Singapore. She also scored in her debut match against Germany. Later that year she represented her country at her first Olympic Games in Rio de Janeiro.

Stewart has been a regular player for the Australian side since her debut, appearing at both the Olympics and the Commonwealth Games.

In 2020, she was named in the squad for her second Olympic Games in Tokyo. She was a member of the squad that finished 5th.

== International goals ==
The following is a list of international goals scored by Stewart.

Goal	Date	Location	Opponent	Score	Result	Competition	Ref.
1	18 January 2016	Sengkang Hockey Stadium, Singapore	Germany	1–0	1–1	Test Match	
2	21 February 2016	Perth Hockey Stadium, Perth, Australia	Great Britain	3–0	3–2	Test Match	
3	3 April 2016	Hawke's Bay Sports Park, Hastings, New Zealand	South Korea	2–0	2–0	2016 Hawke's Bay Cup	
4	5 April 2016	Hawke's Bay Sports Park, Hastings, New Zealand	Canada	3–0	4–0	2016 Hawke's Bay Cup	
5	5 April 2016	Hawke's Bay Sports Park, Hastings, New Zealand	Canada	4–0	4–0	2016 Hawke's Bay Cup	
6	10 April 2016	Hawke's Bay Sports Park, Hastings, New Zealand	China	1–0	3–1	2016 Hawke's Bay Cup	
7	3 June 2016	Marrara Hockey Centre, Darwin, Australia	India	1–0	2–1	2016 Int. Hockey Open	
8	18 June 2016	Lee Valley Hockey and Tennis Centre, London, England	United States	2–1	2–2	2016 Champions Trophy	
9	19 June 2016	Lee Valley Hockey and Tennis Centre, London, England	New Zealand	3–1	3–1	2016 Champions Trophy	
10	26 June 2016	Lee Valley Hockey and Tennis Centre, London, England	United States	2–0	2–2	2016 Champions Trophy	
11	12 October 2017	Sydney Olympic Park, Sydney, Australia	PNG	2–0	23–0	2017 Oceania Cup	
12	12 October 2017	Sydney Olympic Park, Sydney, Australia	PNG	9–0	23–0	2017 Oceania Cup	
13	12 October 2017	Sydney Olympic Park, Sydney, Australia	PNG	12–0	23–0	2017 Oceania Cup	
14	15 November 2017	State Hockey Centre, Adelaide, Australia	Japan	2–0	5–1	Test Match	
15	18 January 2018	Perth Hockey Stadium, Perth, Australia	Spain	1–0	1–1	Test Match	
16	10 April 2018	Gold Coast Hockey Centre, Gold Coast, Australia	Scotland	2–0	2–0	2018 Commonwealth Games	
17	12 April 2018	Gold Coast Hockey Centre, Gold Coast, Australia	India	1–0	1–0	2018 Commonwealth Games	
18	9 February 2019	Tasmanian Hockey Centre, Hobart, Tasmania	China	3–2	4–3	2019 FIH Pro League	
19	10 February 2019	Tasmanian Hockey Centre, Hobart, Tasmania	Germany	2–1	2–2	2019 FIH Pro League	
20	25 April 2019	North Harbour Hockey Stadium, Auckland, New Zealand	New Zealand	4–1	5–1	2019 FIH Pro League	
21	25 April 2019	North Harbour Hockey Stadium, Auckland, New Zealand	New Zealand	5–1	5–1	2019 FIH Pro League	
22	18 August 2019	Oi Hockey Stadium, Tokyo, Japan	India	2–1	2–2	2019 Olympic Test Event	
23	25 October 2019	Perth Hockey Stadium, Perth, Australia	Russia	3–2	4–2	2019 FIH Olympic Qualifiers	
24	26 October 2019	Perth Hockey Stadium, Perth, Australia	Russia	1–0	5–0	2019 FIH Olympic Qualifiers	
25	1 February 2020	Sydney Olympic Park, Sydney, Australia	Great Britain	2–1	2–1	2020 FIH Pro League	
26	25 July 2021	Oi Hockey Stadium, Tokyo, Japan	Spain	3–1	3–1	XXXII Olympic Games	
27	26 July 2021	Oi Hockey Stadium, Tokyo, Japan	China	6–0	6–0	XXXII Olympic Games	
28	30 July 2022	University of Birmingham, Birmingham, England	Kenya	7–0	8–0	2022 Commonwealth Games	
29	3 August 2022	University of Birmingham, Birmingham, England	Scotland	1–0	2–0	2022 Commonwealth Games	
30	12 February 2023	Sydney Olympic Park, Sydney, Australia	Germany	3–0	3–0	2022–23 FIH Pro League	
31	13 August 2023	ITM Hockey Centre, Whangārei, New Zealand	New Zealand	2–1	3–2	2023 Oceania Cup	
32	6 February 2024	Kalinga Stadium, Bhubaneswar, India	United States	3–0	3–0	2023–24 FIH Pro League	
33	7 February 2024	Kalinga Stadium, Bhubaneswar, India	India	1–0	3–0	2023–24 FIH Pro League	
34	9 February 2024	Kalinga Stadium, Bhubaneswar, India	Netherlands	2–6	2–6	2023–24 FIH Pro League	
35	14 February 2024	Birsa Munda International Hockey Stadium, Rourkela, India	China	1–0	2–0	2023–24 FIH Pro League	
36	12 June 2024	Lee Valley Hockey Stadium, London, England	Great Britain	1–1	3–2	2023–24 FIH Pro League	
37	29 July 2024	Stade Yves-du-Manoir, Paris, France	Great Britain	4–0	4–0	XXXIII Olympic Games	
38	18 June 2025	Lee Valley Hockey Stadium, London, England	England	2–0	3–0	2024–25 FIH Pro League	
39	22 June 2025	Ernst-Reuter-Sportfeld, Berlin, Germany	Germany	3–3	4–3	2024–25 FIH Pro League	
40	2 March 2026	Estadio Nacional del Hockey Césped Claudia Schüler, Santiago, Chile	France	2–0	4–0	2026 FIH World Cup Qualifiers	
