= Kristina Bates =

Australian field hockey player

Personal information
- Born: 9 January 1996 (age 30) Port Melbourne, Victoria, Australia
- Height: 5 ft (152 cm)

Sport
- Sport: Field hockey
- Position: Midfield
- Club: Victorian Vipers
National team
Years	Team	Caps	Goals
2017–	Australia	48	(2)
Medal record
Women's field hockey
Representing Australia
Oceania Cup
Gold medal – first place	2017 Sydney
Women’s Pro League
Silver medal – second place	2019 Amsterdam
Junior World Cup
Bronze medal – third place	2016 Santiago

Kristina Bates (born 9 January 1996) is an Australian field hockey player.

Bates was born in North Fitzroy, Victoria, and made her senior international debut during the 2017 Hawke's Bay Cup in New Zealand. She was part of the Hockeyroos team at the World Cup in London 2018.

Bates was part of the Australian women's junior national team 'The Jillaroos' that won bronze at the 2016 Hockey Junior World Cup in Chile.

As of 2022 Bates was studying a Bachelor of Laws at Deakin University. She was also the 2021 and 2022 Premier League captain of Camberwell Hockey Club.
