= Luo Tiantian =

Chinese field hockey player

Personal information
- Born: 12 July 1995 (age 31)

Sport
- Sport: Field hockey
- Club: Jiangsu Province
National team
| Years | Team | Caps | Goals |
| – | China | | - |
Medal record
Women's field hockey
Representing China
Asia Cup
| Silver medal – second place | 2017 Gifu | Team |
Girls' Asia Cup
| Silver medal – second place | 2011 Bangkok |

Luo Tiantian is a Chinese field hockey player for the China national team.
