= Madi Ratcliffe =

Australian field hockey player

Personal information
- Full name: Madeleine Ruby Ratcliffe
- Born: 17 October 1997 (age 28) Warrnambool, Australia
- Height: 170 cm (5 ft 7 in)
- Weight: 62 kg (137 lb)

Sport
- Sport: Field hockey
- Position: Forward
- Club: HC Melbourne
Senior career
Years	Team	Caps	Goals
2016–2018	Victorian Vipers	-	-
2019–2022	HC Melbourne	-	-
2023–2025	Hampstead & Westminster	-	-
2025–	Perth Thundersticks	-	-
National team
Years	Team	Caps	Goals
2016–2018	Australia	39	(9)
Medal record
Women's field hockey
Representing Australia
Commonwealth Games
Silver medal – second place	2018 Gold Coast	Team
Oceania Cup
Gold medal – first place	2017 Sydney	Team

Madeleine Ruby Ratcliffe (born 17 October 1997) is a field hockey player from Australia, who plays as a forward.

== Personal life ==
Ratcliffe was born and raised in Warrnambool, Victoria.

She was a scholarship holder at the Victorian Institute of Sport (VIS), and currently studies a Bachelor of Commerce at Deakin University.

== Career ==
=== National teams ===
==== Under–21 ====
In 2016, Ratcliffe made her debut for the Jillaroos during the Junior Oceania Cup on the Gold Coast. The team won gold, qualifying for the FIH Junior World Cup in Santiago later that year. Ratcliffe was also highest scorer at the tournament, with four goals.

==== Hockeyroos ====
Ratcliffe made her debut for the Hockeyroos in 2016 during a test series against Great Britain in Bunbury and Perth.

During her career, Ratcliffe medalled twice with the Hockeyroos. She won gold at the 2017 Oceania Cup in Sydney, and silver at the 2018 Commonwealth Games on the Gold Coast.

=== International goals ===
Goal	Date	Location	Opponent	Score	Result	Competition	Ref.
1	31 March 2017	Hawke's Bay Sports Park, Hastings, New Zealand	United States	1–1	1–1	2017 Hawke's Bay Cup	
2	3 April 2017	Hawke's Bay Sports Park, Hastings, New Zealand	Japan	2–0	2–1	2017 Hawke's Bay Cup	
3	6 April 2017	Hawke's Bay Sports Park, Hastings, New Zealand	New Zealand	1–0	1–1	2017 Hawke's Bay Cup	
4	2 July 2017	Stade Fallon, Brussels, Belgium	Italy	3–1	3–1	2016–17 HWL Semifinals	
5	6 November 2017	Bendigo Hockey Centre, Bendigo, Australia	United States	1–0	2–0	Test Match	
6	12 November 2017	State Netball and Hockey Centre, Melbourne, Australia	United States	1–0	5–0	2017 Int. Festival of Hockey	
7	16 November 2017	State Hockey Centre, Adelaide, Australia	Japan	1–0	2–1	Test Match	
8	18 November 2017	State Hockey Centre, Adelaide, Australia	Japan	1–0	8–1	Test Match	
9	18 November 2017	State Hockey Centre, Adelaide, Australia	Japan	8–1	8–1	Test Match	
