= Caitlin Van Sickle =

American field hockey player (born 1990)

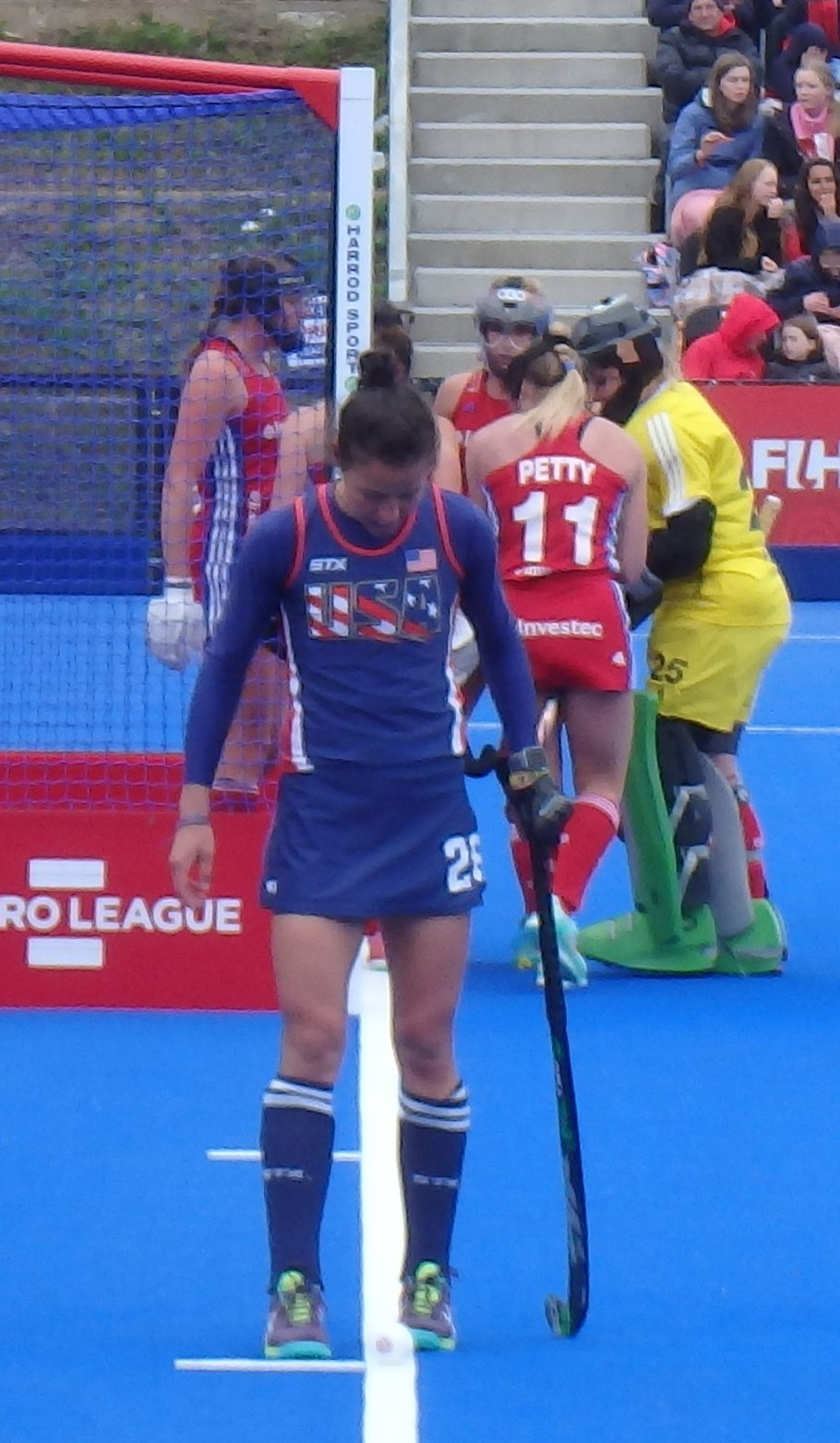
- Van Sickle during the 2019 FIH Pro League game against Great Britain

Personal information
- Born: January 26, 1990 (age 36) Wilmington, Delaware, U.S.
- Height: 5 ft 5 in (165 cm)
- Weight: 128 lb (58 kg)

Sport
- Sport: Field hockey
- Position: Midfielder / defender
National team
Years	Team	Caps	Goals
2013–2019	United States	148	(9)
Medal record
Pan American Games
Bronze medal – third place	2019 Lima	Team

Caitlin Van Sickle (born January 26, 1990) is an American field hockey coach and former player. From Wilmington, Delaware, she was a standout athlete at Tower Hill School where she was the state's athlete of the year in both field hockey and lacrosse. She played field hockey at the collegiate level for the North Carolina Tar Heels from 2009 to 2012, receiving numerous honors including being a three-time All-American and a three-time Atlantic Coast Conference (ACC) Defender of the Year. She won a national championship with the Tar Heels in 2009 and helped them make appearances at three further.

Van Sickle joined the United States women's national field hockey team in 2013. Among her highlights with the national team were an appearance at the 2016 Summer Olympics in Rio de Janeiro and a bronze medal at the 2019 Pan American Games. She retired in 2019, having totaled 148 appearances with the national team and nine goals. She then became a coach.

== Early life ==
Van Sickle was born on January 26, 1990, in Wilmington, Delaware. She played golf at an early age, with her mother, Lori, being the head professional and an instructor at DuPont Country Club. At age six, she tried out soccer, and in fourth grade, she was introduced to field hockey. She attended Tower Hill School and was a standout athlete, excelling at field hockey, basketball and lacrosse.

Van Sickle was friends with future Olympic basketball player Elena Delle Donne through sixth grade at Tower Hill; she focused mainly on the sport until 10th grade and competed at Amateur Athletic Union (AAU) basketball tournaments, before deciding to concentrate on field hockey as a sophomore in high school.

With the field hockey team, Van Sickle made the varsity squad as a high school freshman. She won a state championship with the team as a sophomore in 2005, one of three consecutive she played an important role in leading the team to. As a junior in 2006, Van Sickle, a midfielder, recorded 10 goals and four assists, which included an assist for the first score of the team's 2–0 state championship victory over William Penn High School. At the end of the season, she was named by the Delaware Field Hockey Coaches Association as a first-team all-state selection and the state's player of the year. As a senior, she helped Tower Hill compile an undefeated record of 20–0 while winning their third-straight title; Van Sickle was again chosen first-team all-state and the state player of the year.

Van Sickle also helped the lacrosse team win three-straight state championships; she was all-state in her last two years and was the Delaware Girls Lacrosse Player of the Year in her final season, after scoring 53 goals and 26 assists as a defender. In the 2008 lacrosse state championship game, against St. Andrew's School, she scored two goals and two assists in the win. She also earned second-team all-state honors as a basketball player as a senior. One publication also selected Van Sickle as the Delaware High School Athlete of the Year for 2007–2008.

In her senior year, Van Sickle was teammates on the lacrosse team with her younger sister, Taylor. She accepted an athletic scholarship offer from the University of North Carolina (UNC) to play field hockey for the North Carolina Tar Heels, a team that she had grown up a fan of.

== College career ==
At UNC, Van Sickle first majored in exercise and sports science, before later switching to communications. She joined three fellow Delaware natives with the Tar Heels. She redshirted as a freshman in 2008, but still was named the winner of the team's Ken and Cheryl Williams Rookie of the Year award. After her redshirt year, she became an immediate starter in 2009, starting all 22 games for the team while helping them win the national championship, with Van Sickle recording an assist on the game-winning goal in the title game.

As a sophomore, Van Sickle remained a starter, appearing in every game while scoring 12 goals and six assists, and helping the team to a 22–3 record and an appearance in the NCAA championship. North Carolina lost in the championship to the Maryland Terrapins in double overtime, by a score of 3–2. After the season, Van Sickle received numerous honors, including being named first-team All-American, one of four UNC All-Atlantic Coast Conference (ACC) selections, All-ACC Tournament, and being named the ACC Defender of the Year.

In 2011, Van Sickle helped North Carolina go 23–2, winning the ACC championship while reaching another national championship; she was named All-ACC, first-team All-American, the ACC Defender of the Year, and All-ACC Tournament again, while also being named to the All-NCAA Tournament squad. As a senior in 2012, she helped them reach their fourth-straight NCAA championship, while also winning the ACC crown, and was named the ACC Defender of the Year, All-ACC Tournament, All-ACC, the ACC Tournament Most Valuable Player, and first-team All-American. In her collegiate career, Van Sickle also received three National Field Hockey Coaches Association (NFHCA) first-team All-Region laurels (and second-team honors as a freshman) and was three times named the UNC most valuable player. She received three first-team All-American, three All-ACC Tournament, three All-ACC, and three ACC Defender of the Year honors while also receiving one ACC Tournament MVP selection in her four years as a starter, with four NCAA championship game appearances.

While at North Carolina, a teammate gave her the nickname "Poppy". The nickname is short for the dessert popsicle, with the teammate noting that Van Sickle's last name sounded similar to it.

== International career ==
Van Sickle's first experience with USA Field Hockey was in 2004, when she became a member of the Olympic Development Program as part of the Futures squad. She competed at the National Futures Championship and participated in several Junior National Camps. She was part of the High Performance squad for six years before being promoted in 2010 to the national women's under-21 field hockey team. She was one of 18 players, which included three Tar Heels, selected to tour with the under-21 team in Germany and Ireland in 2011, and helped them go 2–1–2 against those countries' junior national teams. Van Sickle was promoted to the United States women's national field hockey team in 2013, following that year's Women's National Championship.

Van Sickle debuted for the team at the Four Nations tournament in New Zealand in 2013 and helped the team win the silver medal at the Women's Pan American Cup later in the year. Two years later, she was an alternate for the national team at the 2015 Pan American Games. She also played for the national team in their appearance in the Women's FIH Hockey World League, and in the Hockey Champions Trophy tournament; in the latter she contributed a goal in a 2–2 tie game against Australia. One of her national team teammates, Katelyn Falgowski, was also her roommate and teammate at UNC.

On July 1, 2016, Van Sickle was named to the United States women's field hockey team for the 2016 Summer Olympics in Rio de Janeiro. Van Sickle scored the deciding goal in the team's second game of Olympic preliminary play against Australia. She helped the U.S. to a fifth-place finish. The following year, she competed at the FIH Hockey World League and helped the U.S. earn gold in the semifinals. She played at the 2018 Women's Hockey World Cup and in 2019 participated in the Women's FIH Pro League. She helped the U.S. win the bronze medal at the 2019 Pan American Games.

Van Sickle retired from field hockey in December 2019, finishing her international career with nine goals in 148 appearances; she was considered "a key element on the defensive line and as a penalty corner inserter (Note: Referring to the player who inserts the ball from the 10-yard mark on penalty corners.)" with the national team.

== Coaching career and honors ==
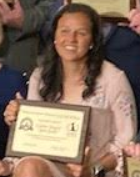
Van Sickle at the Delaware Sports Museum and Hall of Fame induction banquet, 2024

Van Sickle became a coach after her playing career. She served a year as the director of PowerHouse Field Hockey Club, in Wayne, Pennsylvania, before becoming an assistant coach for the Princeton Tigers in 2021. She returned to her alma mater, North Carolina, in 2022, as assistant coach. She also served as a coach at the 2023 Pan American Cup and at the 2024 FIH World Cup.

North Carolina named their annual defender of the year award after Van Sickle. She was selected for induction into the Delaware Sports Museum and Hall of Fame in 2024.
