= Kana Nomura =

Japanese field hockey player

Personal information
- Born: 23 March 1990 (age 36)

Sport
- Sport: Field hockey
- Position: Defender
- Club: Nanko Bank Shotting Stars
National team
Years	Team	Caps	Goals
–	Japan	112	-
Medal record
Women's field hockey
Representing Japan
Asian Champions Trophy
Gold medal – first place	2013 Kakamigahara
Bronze medal – third place	2016 Singapore

Kana Nomura (born 23 March 1990) is a Japanese field hockey player for the Japanese national team.

She participated at the 2018 Women's Hockey World Cup.
