= Madison Fitzpatrick =

Australian field hockey player

Personal information
- Full name: Madison Mae Fitzpatrick
- Born: 14 December 1996 (age 29) Wollongong, Australia
- Height: 1.76 m (5 ft 9 in)

Sport
- Sport: Field hockey
- Position: Defender
- Club: Queensland Scorchers
National team
Years	Team	Caps	Goals
2013–2016	Australia U21	19	(14)
2015–	Australia	71	(16)
Medal record
Women's field hockey
Representing Australia
FIH World Cup
Bronze medal – third place	2022 Terrassa–Amstelveen	Team
Commonwealth Games
Silver medal – second place	2022 Birmingham	Team
FIH Pro League
Silver medal – second place	Season One	Team
Bronze medal – third place	Season Four	Team
Champions Trophy
Silver medal – second place	2018 Changzhou
Oceania Cup
Gold medal – first place	2017 Sydney
Silver medal – second place	2019 Rockhampton
Junior World Cup
Bronze medal – third place	2016 Santiago

Madison Fitzpatrick (born 14 December 1996) is an Australian field hockey player.

Fitzpatrick was born in Wollongong, and made her senior international debut in a test series against Korea in September 2015.

Fitzpatrick was part of the Australian women's junior national team 'The Jillaroos' that won bronze at the 2016 Hockey Junior World Cup in Chile, as well as the Jillaroos team at the 2013 Hockey Junior World Cup.

Fitzpatrick qualified for the Tokyo 2020 Olympics. She was part of the Hockeyroos Olympics squad. The Hockeyroos lost 1–0 to India in the quarterfinals and therefore were not in medal contention.

== Personal life ==
Madison Fitzpatrick comes from a hockey family, with each member of her family having played at a representative level. Her father Scott and sister Savannah both having represented Australia, while her mother, Margie and siblings Callum and Kendra all having represented at state levels.

At the 2016 Hockey Junior World Cup, Madison and Savannah played together in the Jillaroos team that won bronze.

== Playing career ==
=== Senior national team ===
- 2015 Oceania Cup in Stratford, New Zealand – 1st
- 2014–15 Hockey World League Final in Rosario, Argentina – 6th

==== International goals ====
Goal	Date	Location	Opponent	Score	Result	Competition	Ref.
1	6 September 2015	Perth Hockey Stadium, Perth, Australia	South Korea	4–1	5–1	Test match	
2	22 October 2015	TET MultiSports Centre, Stratford, New Zealand	Samoa	18–0	25–0	2015 Oceania Cup	
3	22 October 2015	TET MultiSports Centre, Stratford, New Zealand	Samoa	20–0	25–0	2015 Oceania Cup	
4	21 June 2017	Stade Fallon, Brussels, Belgium	Malaysia	1–0	3–0	2016–17 HWL Semi-finals	
5	21 June 2017	Stade Fallon, Brussels, Belgium	Malaysia	2–0	3–0	2016–17 HWL Semi-finals	
6	1 July 2017	Stade Fallon, Brussels, Belgium	Belgium	2–0	5–1	2016–17 HWL Semi-finals	
7	12 October 2017	Sydney Olympic Park, Sydney, Australia	PNG	13–0	23–0	2017 Oceania Cup	
8	12 October 2017	Sydney Olympic Park, Sydney, Australia	PNG	20–0	23–0	2017 Oceania Cup	
9	14 October 2017	Sydney Olympic Park, Sydney, Australia	New Zealand	1–0	2–1	2017 Oceania Cup	
10	15 November 2017	State Hockey Centre, Adelaide, Australia	Japan	3–0	5–1	Test match	
11	15 November 2017	State Hockey Centre, Adelaide, Australia	Japan	5–0	5–1	Test match	
12	18 November 2017	State Hockey Centre, Adelaide, Australia	Japan	4–1	8–1	Test match	
13	25 November 2018	Wujin Hockey Stadium, Changzhou, China	Netherlands	1–2	1–5	2018 Champions Trophy	
14	4 May 2019	CeNARD, Buenos Aires, Argentina	Argentina	1–0	1–1 (1–3)	2019 FIH Pro League	
15	2 June 2019	Wujin Hockey Stadium, Changzhou, China	China	1–1	3–2	2019 FIH Pro League	
16	9 June 2019	Lee Valley Hockey and Tennis Centre, London, England	Great Britain	1–0	4–2	2019 FIH Pro League	
