= Alyssa Parker =

American field hockey player

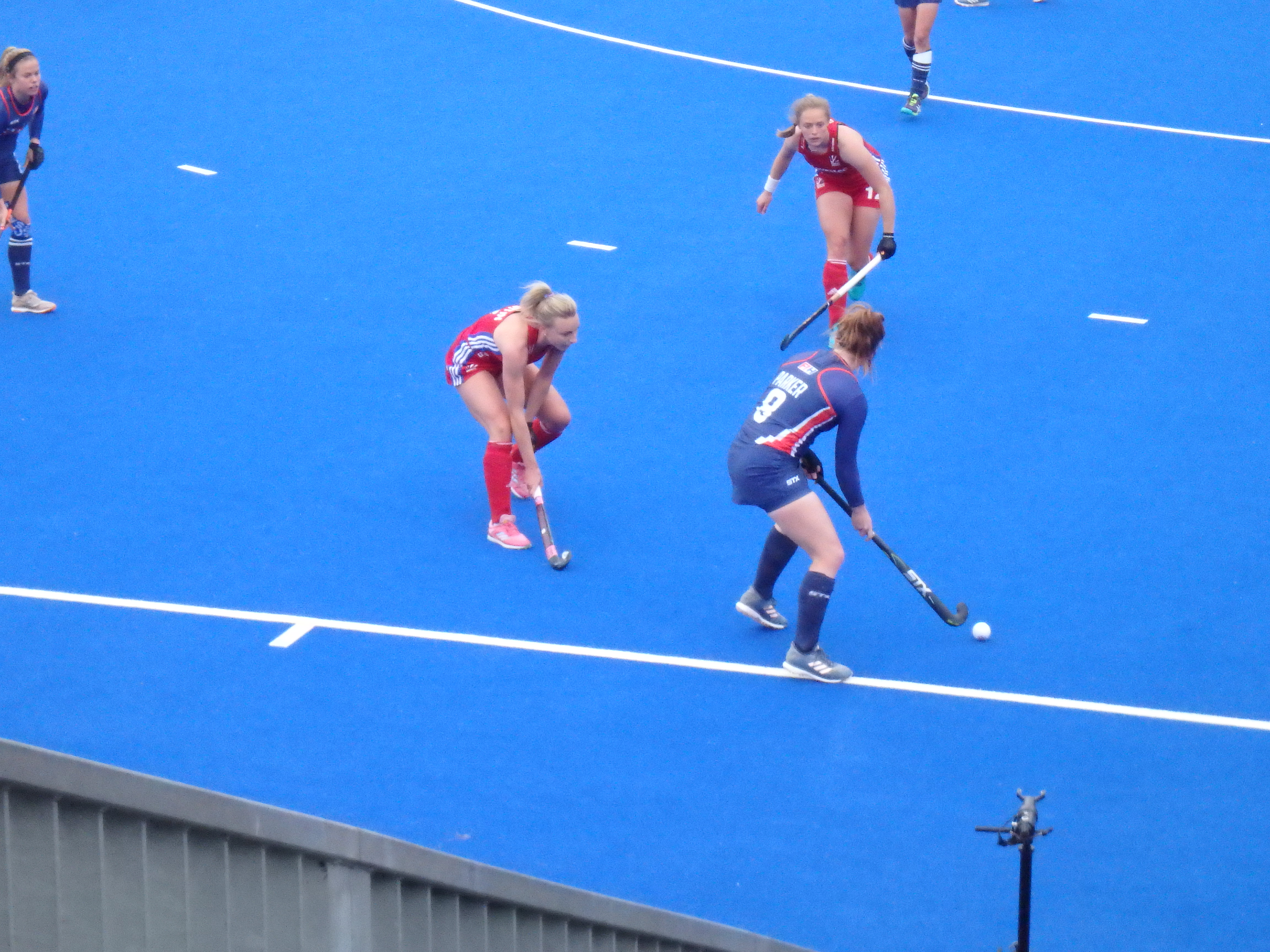
- Alyssa Parker playing in the 2019 FIH Pro League match against Great Britain

Personal information
- National team: United States women's national field hockey team
- Born: August 4, 1994 (age 32) Woodbine, Maryland, U.S.
- Education: University of Maryland
- Height: 5 ft 4 in (163 cm)

Alyssa Parker (born August 4, 1994) is an American field hockey player who plays for the US national team.

== Early life ==
Parker's mom was a field hockey player. When her sister took up field hockey, she decided to start playing as well.

== Career ==
Parker played field hockey for Glenelg High School. She was the first player in the Washington area to score 100 goals during her high school career. She also recorded 100 assists, and is only the second player in the country to have at least 100 goals and assists. She was named the Baltimore Sun's Player of the Year in 2011.

Parker played for the University of Maryland in college.

Parker was part of the US National Team that played in the 2019 FIH Pro League, as well as the 2020 FIH Pro League.
