= Amy Lawton =

Australian field hockey player (born 2002)

Personal information
- Full name: Amy Rose Lawton
- Born: 19 January 2002 (age 24) Worthing, United Kingdom
- Height: 1.62 m (5 ft 4 in)
- Weight: 55 kg (121 lb)

Sport
- Sport: Field hockey
- Position: Midfielder
Senior career
Years	Team	Caps	Goals
2019–2023	HC Melbourne	-	-
2024–2025	Hurley	-	-
2025–	Canberra Chill	-	-
National team
Years	Team	Caps	Goals
2018	Australia U–18	15	(34)
2018–2023	Australia U–21	9	(2)
2019–	Australia	88	(5)
Medal record
Women's field hockey
Representing Australia
FIH World Cup
Bronze medal – third place	2022 Terrassa–Amsterdam	Team
FIH Pro League
Bronze medal – third place	Season Four	Team
Commonwealth Games
Silver medal – second place	2022 Birmingham	Team
Oceania Cup
Gold medal – first place	2023 Whangārei
Silver medal – second place	2019 Rockhampton
Silver medal – second place	2025 Darwin

Amy Rose Lawton (born 19 January 2002) is an Australian field hockey player.

== Personal life ==
Amy Lawton was born in Worthing, England before relocating to Emerald, Victoria at the age of 7 with her parents and younger sister, Josie.

She began playing hockey at nine years of age for her local club Casey, before moving to Cheltenham-based Southern United Hockey Club two years later. As well as hockey, Lawton also plays soccer and competes in triathlons, and has made representative teams for Victoria in all three sports.

Lawton is a current scholarship holder at the Victorian Institute of Sport.

== Career ==
=== Junior national teams ===
==== Under 18 ====
In 2018, Lawton made her debut for the Australian Under 18 team at the Oceania Youth Olympic Games Qualifier in Port Moresby, Papua New Guinea. The team won gold, qualifying for 2018 Youth Olympic Games in Buenos Aires, Argentina.

At the Youth Olympic Games, Lawton again represented the Under 18 side. At the tournament, the team finished fifth.

==== Under 21 ====
Following her debut for the Under 18 side Lawton debuted for the Jillaroos, the Australian Under 21 side, in November of the same year. She scored a double in her first game for the team during a three match test series against New Zealand in Hastings, New Zealand.

=== Senior national team ===
In 2019, Lawton was selected to make her debut for the Hockeyroos during the FIH Pro League. She made her official debut on 25 April 2019 against New Zealand, where the team came away with a 5–1 win. Following her debut in the Pro League, Lawton was called into the team for the 2019 Olympic Test Event held in Tokyo, Japan, where the Australia finished third. At the tournament she scored her first international goal. On 27 August 2019, Lawton was named in the squad for the third time to represent the team at her first Oceania Cup.

Following her breakout year in 2019, Lawton was named in the Hockeyroos Squad for 2020, officially raising her from the National Development Squad. Lawton represented Australia at the 2020 Summer Olympics in Tokyo.

==== International goals ====
Goal	Date	Location	Opponent	Score	Result	Competition	Ref.
1	20 August 2019	Oi Hockey Stadium, Tokyo, Japan	Japan	1–2	2–2	2019 Olympic Test Event	
2	5 September 2019	Kalka Shades Hockey Fields, Rockhampton, Australia	New Zealand	1–3	1–3	2019 Oceania Cup	
3	25 October 2019	Perth Hockey Stadium, Perth, Australia	Russia	2–0	4–2	2019 FIH Olympic Qualifiers	
4	4 March 2023	Tasmanian Hockey Centre, Hobart, Australia	United States	2–1	2–1	2022–23 FIH Pro League	
5	15 June 2025	Lee Valley Hockey Stadium, London, United Kingdom	India	1–1	2–1	2024–25 FIH Pro League	

== Recognition ==
=== AIS Awards ===
Following her 2019 debut for the Hockeyroos, Lawton was presented with the Emerging Athlete of the Year award at the Australian Institute of Sport Awards night.
