= Savannah Fitzpatrick =

Australian field hockey player

Personal information
- Born: 4 February 1995 (age 31) Cabarita Beach, Australia

Sport
- Sport: Field hockey
- Position: Attacker
- Club: Queensland Scorchers
National team
Years	Team	Caps	Goals
2015–2016	Australia U–21	14	(6)
2015–	Australia	64	(15)
Medal record
Women's field hockey
Representing Australia
Commonwealth Games
Silver medal – second place	2018 Gold Coast	Team
FIH Pro League
Silver medal – second place	2019 Amstelveen	Team
Oceania Cup
Silver medal – second place	2019 Rockhampton	Team
Junior World Cup
Bronze medal – third place	2016 Santiago	Team

Savannah "Sav" Fitzpatrick (born 4 February 1995) is an Australian field hockey player.

Fitzpatrick was born in Cabarita Beach, New South Wales, and made her senior international debut in a test series against China in April 2015.

Fitzpatrick was part of the Australian women's junior national team 'The Jillaroos' that won bronze at the 2016 Hockey Junior World Cup in Chile.

Fitzpatrick qualified for the Tokyo 2020 Olympics. She was part of the Hockeyroos Olympics squad. The Hockeyroos lost 1–0 to India in the quarterfinals and therefore were not in medal contention.

== Personal life ==
Savannah Fitzpatrick comes from a hockey family, with each member of her family having played at a representative level. Her father Scott and sister Maddy both having represented Australia, while her mother, Margie and siblings Callum and Kendra all having represented at state levels.

At the 2016 Hockey Junior World Cup, Madison and Savannah played together in the Jillaroos team that won bronze.

== Career ==
=== International Goals ===
Goal	Date	Location	Opponent	Score	Result	Competition	Ref.
1	24 March 2016	Perth Hockey Stadium, Perth, Australia	China	3–1	3–1	Test Match	
2	11 November 2017	State Netball and Hockey Centre, Melbourne, Australia	Japan	1–1	2–3	2017 IFOH	
3	11 November 2017	State Netball and Hockey Centre, Melbourne, Australia	Japan	2–2	2–3	2017 IFOH	
4	15 November 2017	State Hockey Centre, Adelaide, Australia	Japan	1–0	5–1	Test Match	
5	18 November 2017	State Hockey Centre, Adelaide, Australia	Japan	6–1	8–1	Test Match	
6	23 May 2018	Central Otago Sports Club, Cromwell, New Zealand	New Zealand	1–0	3–0	2018 Tri-Nations Tournament	
7	9 February 2019	Tasmanian Hockey Centre, Hobart, Australia	China	4–2	4–3	2019 FIH Pro League	
8	16 February 2019	Perth Hockey Stadium, Perth, Australia	Great Britain	3–0	3–0	2019 FIH Pro League	
9	17 March 2019	Sydney Olympic Park, Sydney, Australia	New Zealand	1–2	1–3	2019 FIH Pro League	
10	25 April 2019	North Harbour Hockey Stadium, Auckland, New Zealand	New Zealand	3–1	5–1	2019 FIH Pro League	
11	10 May 2019	Spooky Nook Sports, Lancaster, United States	United States	2–0	4–0	2019 FIH Pro League	
12	10 May 2019	Spooky Nook Sports, Lancaster, United States	United States	3–0	4–0	2019 FIH Pro League	
13	17 August 2019	Oi Hockey Stadium, Tokyo, Japan	China	1–3	2–3	2019 Olympic Test Event	
14	21 August 2019	Oi Hockey Stadium, Tokyo, Japan	China	3–0	3–1	2019 Olympic Test Event	
