= Kalindi Commerford =

Australian field hockey player

Personal information
- Born: 18 November 1994 (age 31) Bowral, New South Wales

Sport
- Sport: Field hockey
- Position: Attacker
- Club: Canberra Strikers
National team
Years	Team	Caps	Goals
2016–	Australia	36	(5)
Medal record
Women's field hockey
Representing Australia
FIH Pro League
Silver medal – second place	2019 Amstelveen
Oceania Cup
Silver medal – second place	2019 Rockhampton
Champions Trophy
Silver medal – second place	2018 Changzhou

Kalindi Commerford (born 18 November 1994) is an Australian field hockey player.

Commerford was born in Bowral, New South Wales, and made her senior international debut in a test series against New Zealand at the 2016 Trans-Tasman Trophy in Auckland, New Zealand.

She grew up in Milton, New South Wales and played her junior hockey on the south coast of NSW. She started in Nowra with the Ulladulla Jets playing with her brothers. At the age of 11 she began playing with Wollongong University and Jamberoo Hockey Club. She represented South Coast at State Champs.
