= Perth Hockey Stadium =

Hockey stadium in Perth, Western Australia

Coordinates: 32°0′1″S 115°53′30″E

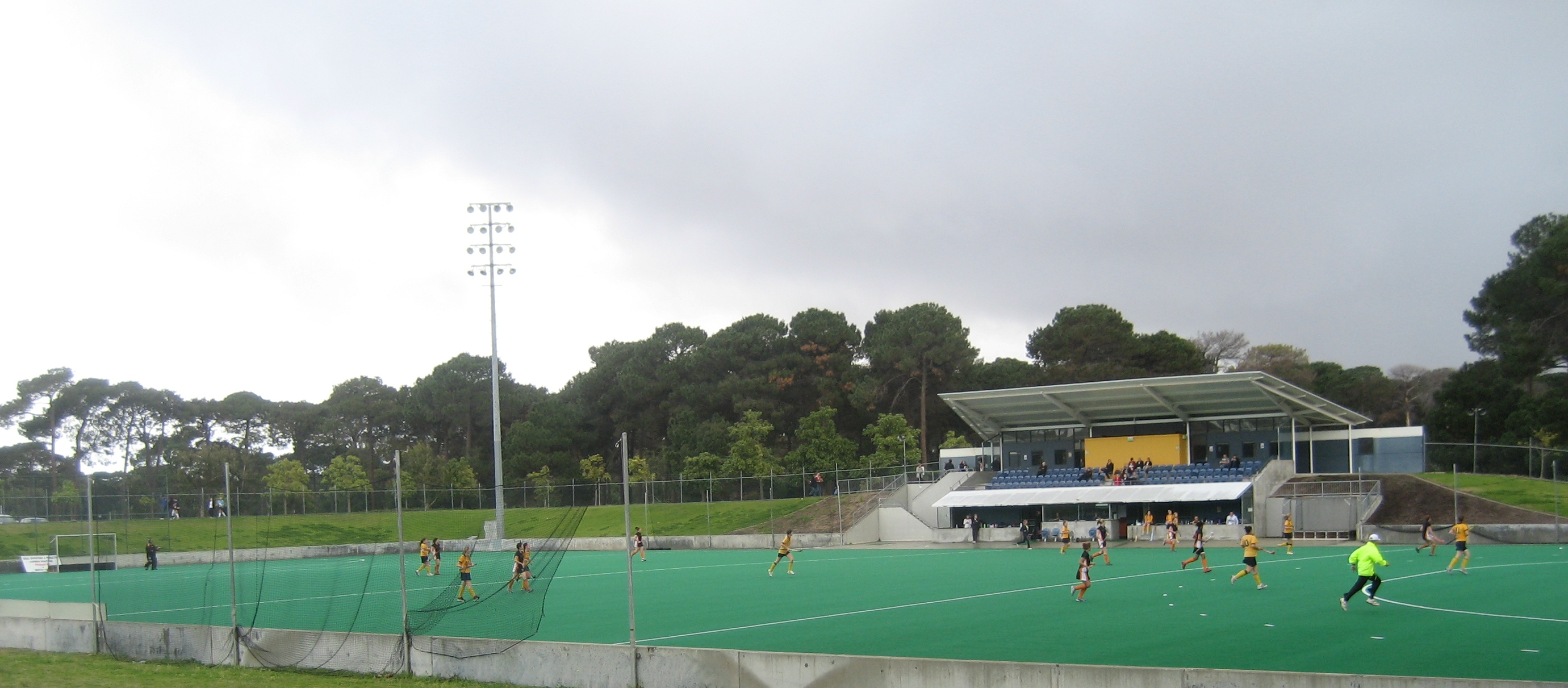
Perth Hockey Stadium field #2

Perth Hockey Stadium (PHS) is Western Australia's premier hockey facility, with two world-class synthetic turf pitches, a large bar and canteen area and a function centre all available to the public. The venue holds up to 6,000 spectators.

PHS is located at the Curtin University campus in the south eastern suburb of Bentley, Western Australia, and played host to the 1985 Champions Trophy and also the 2002 Women's Hockey World Cup. In recent years PHS hosted several Internationals matches and the very successful International 9's Super Series in 2011 and 2012. The stadium is home to the offices of Hockey WA and the Hockey Australia High Performance Programme (including the Hockeyroos and the Kookaburras). Until the end of 2012 the Western Australian Institute of Sport hockey programme was based at PHS.

During the FIH Pro League match between the national field hockey teams of Australia and Great Britain in February 2019, a crowd of 4,000 spectators showed up at the Perth Hockey Stadium.
