= University of Western Australia Hockey Club =

Australian field hockey club

UWA Hockey Club
- Founded: 1924; 102 years ago
- Home arena: University Sports Park
- Colours: Green, blue and gold
- Website: https://uwahockey.org.au/

The University of Western Australia Hockey Club (UWAHC), is represented in every level of competition within Hockey WA which includes the top Men's and Women's Division, the Men's Wizard Cup and the Women's Wizard League competitions in Western Australia. It was formed in 1924 to cater for students at The University of Western Australia who wanted to play field hockey.

The University of WA Hockey Club (UWAHC) is one of the largest hockey clubs in Western Australia with over 400 members in men's, women's and junior teams. Along with being one of the largest clubs in WA it is one of the strongest clubs in competition, with a majority of the teams annually reaching finals. The recent decade has seen the UWAHC accomplish outstanding levels of success.

The club is located at the University Sports Park, McGillivray Oval, McGillivray Road off Brockway Road, Mt Claremont, behind HBF Stadium (Perth Superdrome). The fields are a 10 minutes drive from the UWA.

== Roll of Honour ==
=== Men's ===
==== Club ====
First Grade Champions (10): 1945, 1947, 1949, 1992, 1993, 1995, 2002, 2004, 2005, 2007

The Fairest & Best Award is awarded to the player who receives the most votes from the Hockey WA Olympians Medal (Men's First Division).
The HK Smith Players Player Award is awarded to the player who receives the most votes from his teammates (First Division).
The Peter Sims Award is awarded to the Best player Under the age of 21 (First Division).
The Danny Dunn Award is awarded For the best first year player.

==== InterVarsity ====
The University of Western Australia competes in InterVarsity Hockey against other Western Australian Universities at the Western University Games Series (run by Tertiary Sports WA, or TSWA) and against other Australian Universities at the Australian University Games for the Syme Cup.

The University of Western Australia has won the Syme Cup a total of 16 times. The club sent their first Men's team to the 1934 InterVarsity Hockey which was held in Adelaide, SA and won by The University of Melbourne (MUHC), and won their first Syme Cup in 1946 when the carnival was held in Perth, WA.

The Men's Team Mascot is Tonka the Truck.

In Recent times the team have been dominant, recording their 7th straight win of the Syme Cup in 2010.

To be eligible to represent The University of Western Australia at InterVarsity competition, players must be enrolled at The University of Western Australia, but do not necessarily need to play Club hockey for UWAHC.

The Ross Field Award is awarded to the Best UWAHC player who competes for UWA at InterVarsity (Australian University Games). It was first awarded in 1975.

Year	Syme Cup Result	Ross Field Award	TSWA Result
1970	Champions	No Award	No Competition
1971		No Award	No Competition
1972		No Award	No Competition
1973		No Award	No Competition
1975		Chris Jones	No Competition
1976	Champions	Terry Green	No Competition
1977		Graeme Wright	No Competition
1978		John Bouchier	No Competition
1979		Neil Jilley	No Competition
1980	Champions	David Viner	No Competition
1981		Matthew Jones	No Competition
1982	Champions	Bruce Johnston	No Competition
1983		Bede Rogers	No Competition
1984		David Albrecht	No Competition
1985		Bruce Johnston	No Competition
1986		Stephen Hicks	No Competition
1987		John Hui	No Competition
1988		Justin McKirdy	No Competition
1989		Stephen Hicks	No Competition
1990		Richard McKay	No Competition
1991		Geoff Sandilands	No Competition
1992		Tim Rear	No Competition
1993	DNC	Not Awarded	Runners-up
1994	DNC	Not Awarded	Champions
1995	Champions	Peter Swingler	Champions
1996		Greg Thompson	Champions
1997	7th		Champions
1998	DNC	Not Awarded	Runners-up
1999	3rd		Runners-up
2000	DNC	Ryan Harry	Champions
2001	3rd	Chris Webster	Champions
2002	DNC	Not Awarded	Disqualified
2003	4th	Simon Tiverios	Champions
2004	Champions	Brendon Gairns	Champions
2005	Champions	Simon Tiverios	Champions
2006	Champions	Jonothan Wyber	Champions
2007	Champions	Dylan Foley	Champions
2008	Champions	Ben Ashford	Champions
2008	Champions	Ben Ashford	Runners-up
2010	Champions		Champions

=== Women's ===
==== Club ====
First Grade Champions (14): 1949, 1977, 1979, 1980, 1983, 1988, 1990, 1994, 2002, 2005, 2008, 2010, 2011, 2014.

The Fairest & Best Award is awarded the player who receives the most votes from her teammates (First Division).
The Susan Wood Award is awarded to the Best player Under the age of 21 (First Division).
The Angela Kelly Award is awarded For the best first year player.

==== InterVarsity ====
The University of Western Australia has won the Women's Hockey Cup a total of 11 times. The club sent their first Women's team to the 1946 InterVarsity Hockey which was held in Adelaide, SA and achieved immediate success winning at their first attempt.

The Women's Team Mascot is a Porcelain Statue.

In recent times the team has recorded strong performances, playing in their 3rd consecutive Gold Medal Match and recording their 2nd straight win of the Women's Hockey Cup in 2010.

The Erica Herron Award is awarded to the Best UWAHC player who competes for UWA at InterVarsity (Australian University Games). It was first awarded in 1982.

Year	Women's Hockey Cup Result	Erica Herron Award	TSWA Result
1973	Champions	No Award	No Competition
1974	Champions	No Award	No Competition
1975	Champions	No Award	No Competition
1976		No Award	No Competition
1977	Champions	No Award	No Competition
1978		No Award	No Competition
1979		No Award	No Competition
1980		No Award	No Competition
1981		No Award	No Competition
1982		Janice Adams	No Competition
1983		Pippa Thompson	No Competition
1984		Christine Walker	No Competition
1985		Kate Moore	No Competition
1986		Pippa Thompson	No Competition
1987		Kate Leeming	No Competition
1988		Lisa Ward	No Competition
1989		Kim Aitken	No Competition
1990		Meredith Blake	No Competition
1991		Stephanie Calder	No Competition
1992		Val Boggs	No Competition
1993	DNC	Not Awarded	Champions
1994		Emma Hall	
1995	12th	Emma Hall	
1996	DNC	Not Awarded	Champions
1997	DNC	Not Awarded	Champions
1998	DNC	Not Awarded	
1999			
2000	DNC	Kirsty Hewitt	Champions
2001	14th	Tegan Martyn	Champions
2002	DNC	Not Awarded	3rd
2003	4th	Shonelle Duthie	Champions
2004	7th	Sarah Newman	Runners-up
2005	Runners-up	Felicity Riddell	Champions
2006	5th	Shayni Buswell	Champions
2007	5th	Aleisha Broom	Runners-up
2008	Runners-up	Annalyse Lister	Champions
2009	Champions	Caitlin Pascov	Champions
2010	Champions		Champions

=== Club records ===
David Viner 329 First Grade Games

=== UWAHC Legends Teams ===
UWAHC selected a Men's and Women's Legends team to celebrate its 80th anniversary in 2004.

Men's

Coach: Frank Murray
Captain: Michael Nobbs
GK: Damon Diletti
FB: Geoff Boyce
FB: Steve Hayward
RH: Michael Boyce
CH: Michael Nobbs
LH: David Viner
RW: Tristram Woodhouse
RI: Frank Murray
CF: Mark Hager
LI: Rob Clement
LW: Craig McKenzie
RES GK: John Nettleton
RES FB: Frank Fitzgerald
RES HB: Denis Reynolds
RES U: Matthew Jones
RES ST: Chris Rourke

Other Legends
Syd Johnson
Ray Strauss
Alan Barblett
Robert F Brindley
Todd Williams
Matthew Wells

Women's

Coach: Pam Rothwell
Captain: Jennifer Wealand (now Edmonds)
GK: Chris Worthington
FB: Perrie Henderson
FB: Fiona Simpson (now Miotti)
RH: Sandy Johnstone
CH: Anthea Haselhurst
LH: Jennifer Wealand (now Edmonds)
RW: Sally Carbon (now Broadbridge)
RI: Suzie Ferguson (now Wood)
CF: Julie Waddell
LI: Pippa Thompson (now Button)
LW: Julie McCormack
RES GK: Liz Allen-Williams (now Pederick)
RES FB: Pam Babb
RES HB: Sarah Pugsley
RES FB: Robyn Kemp (now Harvey)
RES ST: Felicity Barrett-Lennard (now Perry)

Other Legends
Margaret Heron (now Longson)
Kathleen Partridge
Rechelle Hawkes
Nikki Mott (now Hudson)
Claire Mitchell-Taverner
