= 2022 Women's Ric Charlesworth Classic =

Field hockey competition

Tournament details
- Host country: Australia
- City: Perth
- Dates: 26 March – 2 April
- Teams: 4
- Venue: Perth Hockey Stadium

Final positions
- Champions: –– Highlanders (1st title)
- Runner-up: –– Breakers
- Third place: –– Outbacks

Tournament statistics
- Matches played: 8
- Goals scored: 33 (4.13 per match)
- Top scorer(s): –– Savannah Fitzpatrick –– Matilda Banfield (5 goals)

The 2022 Women's Ric Charlesworth Classic was the third edition of the women's Ric Charlesworth Classic, an Australian field hockey competition organised by Hockey WA. It was held from 26 March – 2 April 2022 in Perth, Western Australia.

The Highlanders won the tournament for the first time, defeating the Breakers 3–1 in penalties after the final finished as a 3–3 draw. The Outbacks finished in third place, defeating the Suns 3–2.

== Teams ==
- –– Breakers
- –– Highlanders
- –– Outbacks
- –– Suns

== Results ==
=== Preliminary round ===
Pos	Team	Pld	W	D	L	GF	GA	GD	Pts	Qualification
1	–– Breakers	3	3	0	0	10	3	+7	9	Advanced to Final
2	–– Highlanders	3	1	1	1	5	4	+1	4	Advanced to Final
3	–– Outbacks	3	1	1	1	5	8	−3	4	
4	–– Suns	3	0	0	3	2	7	−5	0	

Source: Hockey WA
Rules for classification: 1) Points; 2) Goal difference; 3) Goals scored; 4) Games won; 5) Head-to-head.

==== Fixtures ====
26 March 2022
12:30

Breakers ––	6–2	–– Outbacks
Byrnes 5', 50'; Wardrope 6'; Fitzpatrick 6', 27'; Chilwell 11'	Report	Collins 19'; Banfield 33'

Umpires:
Sarah Allanson (AUS)
Logan Pow (AUS)

26 March 2022
14:00

Suns ––	1–3	–– Highlanders
Dowd 53'	Report	Bone 18', 40'; Fidoe 42'

Umpires:
Ruby Guilfoyle (AUS)
Gregor Maier (AUS)

27 March 2022
12:00

Highlanders ––	0–1	–– Breakers
	Report	Rockliff 45'

Umpires:
Joshua Monaghan (AUS)
Peter Wright (RSA)

27 March 2022
12:00

Outbacks ––	1–0	–– Suns
Banfield 56'	Report

Umpires:
Madeleine Smith-Gander (AUS)
Sarah Allanson (AUS)

30 March 2022
18:30

Suns ––	1–3	–– Breakers
Dowd 46'	Report	Fitzpatrick 7', 15'; Denning 39'

Umpires:
Bernadette Pangrazio (AUS)
Madeleine Smith-Gander (AUS)

30 March 2022
20:00

Outbacks ––	2–2	–– Highlanders
Banfield 6', 10'	Report	Buckley 29'; McCaffrey 42'

Umpires:
Ruby Guilfoyle (AUS)
Joshua Monaghan (AUS)

=== Classification round ===
==== Third and fourth place ====
2 April 2022
13:00

Outbacks ––	3–2	–– Suns
Banfield 13'; Flynn 33', 47'	Report	Leiper 26'; Peacock 45'

Umpires:
Ruby Guilfoyle (AUS)
Madeleine Smith-Gander (AUS)

==== Final ====
26 March 2022
16:00

Breakers ––	3–3	–– Highlanders
White 13'; Fitzpatrick 23'; Malan 60'	Report	Buckley 2', 48'; DeSilva 24'
Penalties
Malan (penalty shoot-out missed); Sertorio (penalty shoot-out missed); Fitzpatrick (penalty shoot-out scored); Byrnes (penalty shoot-out missed)	1–3	(penalty shoot-out missed) Bone; (penalty shoot-out scored) DeSilva; (penalty shoot-out scored) Du Preez; (penalty shoot-out scored) Buckley

Umpires:
Sarah Allanson (AUS)
Joshua Monaghan (AUS)

== Statistics ==
=== Final standings ===
As per statistical convention in field hockey, matches decided in extra time are counted as wins and losses, while matches decided by penalty shoot-outs are counted as draws.

Pos	Team	Pld	W	D	L	GF	GA	GD	Pts	Final Result
1st place, gold medalist(s)	–– Highlanders	4	1	2	1	8	7	+1	5	Tournament Champion
2nd place, silver medalist(s)	–– Breakers	4	3	1	0	13	6	+7	10	
3rd place, bronze medalist(s)	–– Outbacks	4	2	1	1	8	10	−2	7	
4	–– Suns	4	0	0	4	4	10	−6	0	

Source: Hockey WA
