= Ray Strauss =

Australian cricketer

Personal information
- Full name: Raymond Bernard Strauss
- Born: 4 November 1927; Perth, Western Australia
- Died: 28 July 2013 (aged 85); Nedlands, Western Australia
- Batting: Right-handed
- Bowling: Right-arm fast-medium
- Role: Bowler

Domestic team information
- Years: Team
- 1952/53–1959/60: Western Australia

Career statistics
Competition	First-class
Matches	37
Runs scored	805
Batting average	16.42
100s/50s	0/2
Top score	52
Balls bowled	8,399
Wickets	139
Bowling average	24.29
5 wickets in innings	9
10 wickets in match	0
Best bowling	7/59
Catches/stumpings	11/–
- Source: CricketArchive, 28 July 2013

Raymond Bernard Strauss (4 November 1927 – 28 July 2013) was an Australian sportsman who played both cricket and field hockey at high levels. From Perth, Western Australia, Strauss attended Perth Modern School and later the University of Western Australia, playing for the university's hockey club. Twice named captain of the all-Australian universities side, he was captain of the side on several occasions, including when the team shared the 1952 Syme Cup with the University of Adelaide. Strauss represented Western Australia on various occasions from 1949 to 1955, and made his Test debut for the Australia men's national field hockey team in August 1954, against New Zealand (with cricket teammate Ian Dick captaining the side), though it is unclear if he played further matches for the national side. At both club and state levels, he had largely played as a defender, usually as a fullback, and was known for his "interceptions and long clearances".

Playing first for East Perth and then University at WACA district level, Strauss had played cricket matches for state colts teams as early as the 1950–51 season, but did not make his first-class debut for the state's senior team until the end of the 1952–53 season, playing for the state against the touring Australian and South African national teams. Opening the bowling with Harry Price against the South Africans, he took 7/75 in the side's second innings, although Western Australia still lost the match by 175 runs. A regular in the side throughout the remainder of the 1950s, Strauss took 25 wickets in a season on three separate occasions (1956–57, 1958–59, and 1959–60), often partnering with Des Hoare and Ron Gaunt. His best bowling figures came during the 1956–57 season in the opening Sheffield Shield match against South Australia, when he took 7/59 from 18 eight-ball overs. He finished that season with 33 wickets at an average of 22.48, the most of any fast bowler and second only to Victoria's Lindsay Kline (37 wickets) overall.

Having played his last matches for Western Australia during the 1959–60 season, Strauss spent both the 1960 and 1961 English seasons as the professional player for the East Lancashire Cricket Club in the Lancashire League, playing 52 league and seven cup matches over the two seasons. East Lancashire made the final of the Worsley Cup (the league's knockout competition) in both seasons, winning in 1961. Strauss took five-wicket hauls in both years, as well as scoring a half-century in the 1960 loss. However, his performance in that match was largely overshadowed by that of Burnley's professional, Indian Test player Dattu Phadkar, who took 8/54 and scored 68 not out. In league matches, Strauss took the most wickets for the club in both seasons, as well as leading the club's runs aggregates in the 1960 season. His 104 wickets during that season was only bettered by West Indies international Roy Gilchrist. He finished his first-class career with 139 wickets from 37 matches.

Strauss died in Perth in July 2013, aged 85.
