= University series =

University series may refer to:

- Allen Drury's University series, a trilogy of novels written between 1990 and 1998
- Western University Games Series, a multi-sport competition among Western Australian universities
- List of Sweet Valley University novels by Francine Pascal
