= Hockey WA =

Australian field hockey governing body

Western Australia Hockey Association
- Sport: Field hockey
- Abbreviation: WAHA
- Founded: 1948; 78 years ago
- Affiliation: Hockey Australia

Official website
- www.hockeywa.org.au
- (Queensland)

Hockey WA is the organisation responsible for the sport of Field Hockey in the state of Western Australia. Hockey WA is represented in the Hockey One competition by the Perth Thundersticks. Hockey WA also run the top club competitions in Australia, the Hockey WA Premier League for both Men and Women.

In late 2003, Hockey WA was formed from a merger between the Western Australian Men's Hockey Association and the Western Australian Women's Hockey Association. It is approaching 100 years since the establishment of the individual Associations and it is anticipated that the amalgamation will be of major benefit to Hockey in Western Australia.

== Early history ==
Early records indicated that hockey matches were taking place in Western Australia around 1903 and that by 1906 four Teams existed in the Perth area. In 1906 an inter-club competition had begun and by 1908 the Western Australian Hockey Association had been formed.

Games involving women and particularly schoolgirls were reported in the early 1900s and the Western Australian Women's Hockey Association was officially formed on 14 June 1916.

The Western Australian Association decided to adopt the Rules and Regulations of The Hockey Association and sought affiliation with that England based body in 1907.

The early Western Australian teams were mainly located in the Perth area. However the Wilberforce Club Team emerged in 1906 and carried the name of the Hamersley Farm and Homestead, which was situated near York. The Wilberforce team was a family affair and for many of the matches the team mainly comprised the members of two families. The opposing teams were required to travel (by train) back and forth to York and to the City (some 100 kilometres each way) to complete their match programme.

The condition of some of the playing surfaces that were available in these early times was reported to be "poor". However, this may have been partly acceptable to the match participants who were often referred to as being "enthusiastic and robust". The "Association Ground" was the W.A.C.A Cricket Ground of today and was one of the better pitches and regular venues for the hockey matches. Matches were also played at the Royal Agricultural Society's Claremont Show-Grounds and at the South Perth Zoological Gardens.

In the first few years up to six teams including Perth, Wilberforce, Fremantle, YMCA, Claremont and Guildford engaged in hard-fought games in an endeavour to win the Hope Cup, which had been donated by Dr. Hope and was contested by the top grade teams from 1908. Early honours were shared between the Perth and Wilberforce Clubs. In the five-year period from 1908 to 1912 Wilberforce won the Cup three times and Perth won twice.

Inter-Club matches continued until 1915 when World War I intervened and it was in the early 1920s before hockey resumed on a competitive basis. The formation of an Australian Hockey Association had been under consideration and was formalised on 29 June 1925 when the first Annual General Meeting was held in Sydney.

In 1928, Western Australia participated for the first time in an Australian Senior Championship. The team travelled by Ocean Liner across the Bight to Adelaide to contest the Title, which was ultimately won by the Home Team. Following this, the other States agreed to travel to Perth to take part in the 1929 Carnival, which coincided with this State's Centenary year. Western Australia had its first Title victory in that special year and went on to win the Championship twice in the 1930s and was a strong contender thereafter.

After the Second World War and in the late 1940s, the hockey standards in Western Australia and to a lesser extent in other parts of Australia were strengthened by an influx of skilful and promising young players and coaches, particularly from India, who came to settle in Australia after Independence was gained.

The Senior Inter-State Championship was held annually and the venue rotated among the States. Western Australia was a prominent force. In the period from 1928 to 1992, Western Australia won 29 of the 61 Championships held and this included a nine-year period (1962–70) when eight titles were won. Since 1992, the National Hockey League has become the major annual inter-state competition and Western Australia has won six of the twelve Titles contested to date.

The Western Australian Women's Teams have also been successful at National Championship level. After first competing in 1921, Western Australia won the Championship on 43 occasions including 30 wins in the 35-year period (1957–1991).

The State Teams made contributions to the development of players and aided selection in Australia's Men and Women's National and International teams. In addition, Perth has been be acknowledged to be the centre of top-level inter-Club competition.

== National Championships ==
=== Men ===
==== AHL ====
1991 – 2018
Champions: 1992, 1993, 1995, 1999, 2000, 2002, 2008, 2009, 2011

==== Hockey One ====
2019 - Present

==== Open ====
1925 - 1994
Champions: 1929, 1936, 1938, 1950, 1955, 1956, 1958, 1960, 1962, 1963, 1964, 1965, 1966, 1967, 1969, 1970, 1972, 1974, 1975, 1976, 1977, 1979, 1981, 1982, 1983, 1984, 1986, 1987, 1991

==== Under 21 ====
1946 - Present
Champions: 1946, 1948, 1949, 1951, 1952, 1962, 1966, 1967, 1974, 1982, 1983, 1988, 1989, 1996, 2002, 2005, 2011, 2022, 2023, 2024, 2025, 2026

==== Under 18 ====
1994 - Present
Champions: 1998, 2002, 2004, 2005, 2015, 2016, 2022

==== Under 17 ====
1982-1993
Champions: 1984, 1990, 1991,

==== Under 16 ====
1950 - 1981
2024 - Present
Champions: 1952, 1953, 1954, 1955, 1957, 1958, 1962, 1970, 1973

==== Under 15 ====
1980-2023
Champions: 1982, 1983, 1996, 1999, 2001, 2015, 2019

==== Under 14 ====
2024 - Present
Champions: 2024, 2025

==== Under 13 ====
2003 - 2023
Champions: 2018, 2023

=== Women ===
==== AHL ====
1993 – 2018
Champions: 1994, 2004, 2006, 2007, 2008, 2010

==== Hockey One ====
2019 - Present
Champions: 2024

==== Open ====
1910-1993
Champions: 1929, 1938, 1939, 1946, 1947, 1948, 1949, 1950, 1951, 1952, 1953, 1955, 1956, 1957, 1958, 1959, 1960, 1962, 1963, 1964, 1965, 1966, 1967, 1968, 1969, 1970, 1972, 1973, 1974, 1975, 1976, 1977, 1979, 1981, 1982, 1985, 1986, 1987, 1988, 1989, 1990, 1991

==== Under 21 ====
1984 - Present
Champions: 1985, 1988, 2008, 2011

==== Under 18 ====
Under 19 1976 - 1983
1984 - Present
Champions: 1979, 1985, 1987, 1996, 1997, 2006

==== Under 16 ====
2024-Present
Champions:

==== Under 15 ====
2002-2023
Champions: 2005, 2008

==== Under 14 ====
2024 - Present
Champions:

==== Under 13 ====
2005 - 2023
Champions: 2012

== Men's Competition ==
=== Premier League ===
Consists of 12 teams, who play each other on a Home & Away basis covering 22 rounds. At the completion of the season the Minor Premier is awarded the Guth Ardagh flag.

Following the regular season a finals series is played by the top 5 teams to determine the Premier, who is awarded the L.R. Connell Trophy.

Guth Ardagh pennant is awarded to the team that finishes the season on top of the premiership ladder, otherwise known as the minor premiership.

==== Promotion & Relegation ====
- The lowest finishing Team in a Division or Grade will be relegated, provided a Team from the Division or Grade directly below is eligible for promotion.
- A Team can be promoted by being the highest finishing Team in the top four of a Division or Grade, unless there is already a Team from the same Club in that Division.
- For the avoidance of doubt, the time at which the 'same Club' rule takes effect is the time of promotion. The effect of this is that if a Team from the same Club is relegated from being the lowest finishing team, there is a vacant position for the Team in the next lowest Division or Grade from the same Club to be promoted into, should it be eligible.
- If a Team is relegated into a Division or Grade where there is another Team from the same Club, and that Team hasn't been promoted under guideline, that other Team will be relegated. This process continues until there is a Division or Grade where there is no other Team from the same Club.
- If the effect of a Team being relegated as a result of the point above is that the division they were relegated from will have fewer Teams than required by rule 1d (see below) then the Team that would otherwise have been relegated from that Division or Grade due to being the lowest finishing Team will not be relegated.

Rule 1d

The number of Teams and rounds will be as follows, unless otherwise determined by Hockey WA:

Men -

Premier Division One and Two - 12

Premier Division Three - 10

Divisions Four to Ten - 9 or 10

==== Total Premierships ====
Club	Premierships	Most Recent
Westside Wolves; Includes Cricketers Hockey Club, Old Scotch Collegians & Christ Church Hockey Clubs	22	1989
YMCC; Includes YMCA Perth & YMCA Coastal City Hockey Clubs	15	2026
UWA Hockey Club	13	2025
Suburban Lions Hockey Club; Includes Suburban Nedlands Hockey Club, Riverside Lions (formerly Subiaco Hockey Club) Hockey Club	12	1987
North Coast Raiders; Includes Perth & Scarborough Hockey Clubs	12	1959
Curtin University Hockey Club; Includes Curtin Trinity Tigers & Curtin Trinity Pirates Hockey Clubs	7	2001
Reds Hockey Club; Includes Old Aquinians Hockey Club	5	2020
Wesley South Perth (WASPS); Includes Old Wesley Collegians Hockey Club	5	2019
Mods-OGM; Includes Old Guildfordians Hockey Club, Mundaring Hockey Club, Old Guildfordian's Mundaring Hockey Club (OGMHC) & Old Modernians Hockey Club	4	1970
Victoria Park Panthers; Includes Xavier Hockey Club	3	2012
Fremantle - Cockburn	3	2006
Hale	2	2023
Melville; Includes Applecross Hockey Club	2	2022

==== Challenge Cup ====
A mini-final is played between the top 2 teams after the completion of round 11, the winner is awarded the Challenge Cup. This competition ceased to be played after 2012 due to the tight schedule.

==== Champion Club (R & I Cup) ====
Was a knockout competition open to all clubs across the state. Inaugurated in 1978 and proved to be hugely successful in bringing together clubs from the Perth metropolitan areas with their country counterparts it ceased to be run after 1992.

=== Year by Year ===
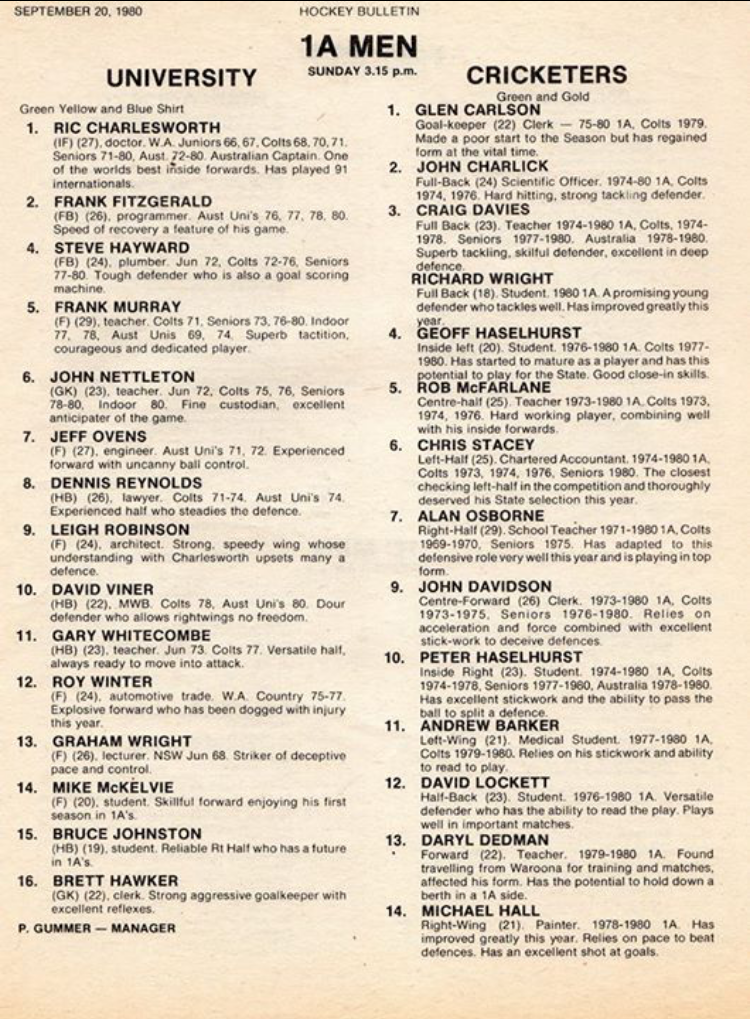
1980 WAHA 1A Grand Final, University v Cricketers

Year	Premier (L.R. Connell Trophy)	Runner-up	Guth Ardagh (Minor Premiers) 1966 on	Challenge Cup	Champion Club (R & I Club Cup) 1978-1992
1908	Perth				
1909	Wilberforce				
1910	Wilberforce				
1911	Perth				
1912	Wilberforce				
1913	Cottesloe				
1914	Claremont				
1915	World War I - No Competition				
1916	World War I - No Competition				
1917	World War I - No Competition				
1918	World War I - No Competition				
1919	Claremont				
1920	Claremont				
1921	Claremont				
1922	Suburban				
1923	Suburban				
1924	Suburban				
1925	Suburban				
1926	Suburban			Suburban	
1927	Suburban			Suburban	
1928	Perth	Suburban		Suburban	
1929	Perth	Suburban		Suburban	
1930	Suburban			Suburban	
1931	Perth				
1932	Guildford				
1933	Perth				
1934	Perth				
1935	Perth				
1936	Perth				
1937	Cricketers				
1938	Cricketers				
1939	Cricketers				
1940	Cricketers				
1941	Suburban				
1942	World War II - No Competition				
1943	World War II - No Competition				
1944	World War II - No Competition				
1945	University				
1946	Cricketers	Old Aquinians			
1947	Guildford; University				
1948	Cricketers				
1949	University				
1950	Fremantle				
1951	Cricketers				
1952	Fremantle				
1953	Cricketers				
1954	Cricketers				
1955	CBC				
1956	CBC				
1957	Perth				
1958	Perth				
1959	Perth				
1960	Cricketers				
1961	Trinity				
1962	Cricketers				
1963	Cricketers				
1964	YMCA Perth				
1965	Cricketers				
1966	YMCA Perth				
1967	Cricketers				
1968	YMCA Perth				
1969	Old Modernians				
1970	Old Modernians				
1971	Cricketers				
1972	YMCA Perth				
1973	Cricketers				
1974	Old Aquinians		Old Aquinians	Old Aquinians	
1975	YMCA Perth				
1976	Cricketers	University			
1977	Cricketers	University			
1978	YMCA Perth	Cricketers	Old Aquinians	Old Modernians	Cricketers
1979	Cricketers	YMCA Perth		Cricketers	
1980	Cricketers	University			University
1981	Old Aquinians				
1982	Suburban Nedlands				
1983	Suburban Nedlands				
1984	Suburban Nedlands				
1985	YMCA Perth		YMCA Perth	YMCA Perth	YMCA Perth
1986	Cricketers	Old Aquinians		Cricketers	YMCA Perth
1987	Suburban Nedlands				Westside Wolves
1988	YMCA Perth			WASPS	
1989	Westside Wolves			Westside Wolves	
1990	Wesley South Perth				
1991	Wesley South Perth				
1992	University	North Coast Raiders	University	University	University
1993	University	Wesley South Perth	University		University
1994	Old Aquinians	University			
1995	University	Victoria Park Panthers	Wesley South Perth		
1996	Victoria Park Panthers	Old Aquinians			
1997	Curtin Trinity Tigers	YMCA Coastal City			
1998	Curtin Trinity Pirates	YMCA Coastal City			
1999	YMCA Coastal City	Westside Wolves			
2000	Curtin Trinity Pirates	The University of WA			
2001	Curtin Trinity Pirates	The University of WA			
2002	The University of WA	Westside Wolves	YMCA Coastal City		
2003	Wesley South Perth	The University of WA			
2004	The University of WA	Wesley South Perth	Wesley South Perth	Wesley South Perth	
2005	The University of WA	Westside Wolves	The University of WA	The University of WA	
2006	Fremantle	The University of WA	The University of WA	Not Contested	
2007	The University of WA	Hale	The University of WA	Westside Wolves	
2008	Victoria Park Panthers	Fremantle	YMCA Coastal City	Victoria Park Panthers	
2009	YMCA Coastal City	Westside Wolves	The University of WA	YMCA Coastal City	
2010	Hale	The University of WA	Wesley South Perth	The University of WA	
2011	YMCA Coastal City	Victoria Park Panthers	YMCA Coastal City	Victoria Park Panthers	
2012	Victoria Park Panthers	Wesley South Perth	The University of WA		
2013	YMCA Coastal City	Westside Wolves	YMCA Coastal City		
2014	YMCA Coastal City	The University of WA	Wesley South Perth		
2015	YMCA Coastal City	Wesley South Perth	The University of WA		
2016	Wesley South Perth	Melville	The University of WA		
2017	The University of WA	Wesley South Perth	The University of WA		
2018	Old Aquinians	YMCA Coastal City	YMCA Coastal City		
2019	Wesley South Perth	Hale	Melville		
2020	Old Aquinians	The University of WA	Old Aquinians		
2021	Melville	Old Aquinians	Melville		
2022	Melville	Old Aquinians	Melville		
2023	Hale	Melville	Melville		
2024	UWA	Melville	Melville		
2025	UWA	Victoria Park Panthers	UWA		
2026	YMCC	Westside Wolves	YMCC		

=== Awards ===
==== Olympians' Medal ====
Awarded annually to the Fairest and Best player in the men's first division competition. Umpires award one set of votes for each qualifying season game on a 5-4-3-2-1 basis with votes confidentially tabulated by Hockey WA and awarded at the Annual Dinner.

==== Eric Pearce Top Goalscorer Award ====
Named in 2009 after prolific West Australian and Australian Striker Eric Pearce. Is Awarded to the top Goalscorer from the Premier League regular season.

==== Just Hockey Top Goalkeeper Award ====
Is awarded to the goalkeeper from the Premier League that polls the most votes in the Olympians' Medal.

==== Paul Gaudoin Youth Award ====
Is awarded to the player Under 21 years of age, who polls the most votes during the Premier League regular season. Is named after former West Australian and Australian Captain Paul Gaudoin.

==== Merv Adams Medal ====
Is awarded to the fairest and best player from the Premier League Grand Final.

==== Roll of Honour ====
Year	Olympians' Medal	Eric Pearce Top Goalscorer	Just Hockey Top Goalkeeper	Paul Gaudoin Youth Award	Merv Adams Medal
1976	Steve Hayward (University)				
1977	David Bell (Old Aquinians)				
1978	David Bell (Fremantle)				
1979	David Bell (Fremantle)				
1980	Ric Charlesworth (University)				
1981	Michael Nobbs (Suburban Nedlands)				
1982	Steve Hayward (University)				
1983	Craig Davies (Fremantle)				
1984	Geoff Bott (YMCA)				
1985	Terry Lecce (Fremantle)				
1986	David Bell (Old Aquinians)				
1987	John Bestall (Trinity Tigers)				
1988	Bryan Zekulich (Wesley South Perth)				
1989	Warren Birmingham (Fremantle)				
1990	Michael Nobbs (University)				
1991	Geoff Bott (YMCA)				
1992	Paul Lewis (North Coast Raiders)				
1993	Peter Haselhurst (Westside Wolves)				
1994	Paul Armitage (Westside Wolves)				
1995	Graham Reid (Victoria Park Panthers)	Glen Kingston 27 (Old Aquinians) Greg Corbitt 27 (Victoria Park Panthers)			
1996	Lee Bodimeade (Wesley South Perth) Graham Reid (Victoria Park Panthers)	Greg Corbitt 23 (Victoria Park Panthers)			
1997	Matthew Wells (Old Modernians)	Daniel Davison 29 (Victoria Park Panthers)			
1998	Graham Reid (Victoria Park Panthers)	Michael McCann 25 (Old Aquinians)			
1999	Ian Wishart (YMCA Coastal City)	Bad Gaudoin 29 (Westside Wolves)			
2000	Ian Wishart (YMCA Coastal City)	Craig Emslie 25 (Hale)			
2001	Paul Armitage (Westside Wolves)	Tristram Woodhouse 39 (The University of WA)			Matthew Wells (The University of WA)
2002	Tom Kavanagh (Hale)	Tristram Woodhouse 30 (The University of WA)	Jason Vuletich (Westside Wolves)		Matthew Wells (The University of WA)
2003	Andrew Smith (Hale)	Andrew Smith 33 (Hale)	Yuashiro Nobui (Victoria Park Panthers)		Kyle Rodrigues (WASPS)
2004	David Hennessy (Wesley South Perth)	Steven Boyce 30 (The University of WA)		Steven Boyce (The University of WA)	David Hennessy (Wesley South Perth)
2005	Alistair Park (Westside Wolves)	Jeremy Hiskins 27 (Fremantle)		Paul Nicholls (Fremantle)	Grant Schubert (The University of WA)
2006	Phil Hulbert (Victoria Park Panthers)	Daniel Trigwell 26 (South West Strikers)	George Watts (Melville)	Ian Burcher (Victoria Park Panthers)	Leon Martin (Fremantle)
2007	Darryl McCormick (Fremantle)	Dylan Roe 27 (Victoria Park Panthers)	Chris Munro (Wesley South Perth)	Eddie Ockenden (YMCA Coastal City)	Geoff Boyce (The University of WA)
2008	Phil Marshall (Fremantle)	Matthew Naylor 31 (WASPS)	George Watts (North Coast Raiders)	Travis Taylor (Victoria Park Panthers)	Darren Parkes (Victoria Park Panthers)
2009	Craig Boyne (YMCA Coastal City) Brent Dancer (Wesley South Perth) Nathan Eglington (Westside Wolves)	Nathan Eglington 39 (Westside Wolves)	George Watts (North Coast Raiders)	Craig Boyne (YMCA Coastal City)	Tyler Lovell (YMCA Coastal City)
2010	Kiel Brown (WASPS) Greg Reece (Hale Hockey Club)	Sam Pike 40 (The University of WA)	Leon Hayward (OGMHC)	Chris Bausor (The University of WA)	Matt Gohdes (Hale)
2011	Phil Hulbert (Victoria Park Panthers)	Sam Pike 37 (The University of WA)	Tristan Clemons (Melville)	Nathan McGuire (Curtin Trinity Pirates)	Matthew Lim (YMCA Coastal City)
2012	Ian Burcher (Victoria Park Panthers) Jacob Whetton (Victoria Park Panthers)	Sam Pike 29 (The University of WA)	Andrew Cooke (OGMHC)	Jacob Whetton (Victoria Park Panthers)	Ian Burcher (Victoria Park Panthers)
2013	Aran Zalewski (Old Aquinians)	Geoff Cock 32 (Hale)	Tristan Clemons (Melville)	Ross Hall (Melville)	Eddie Ockenden (YMCA Coastal City)
2014	Tom Wickham (The University of WA)	Tim Bates 25 (OGMHC)	James Richardson (OGMHC) Mike Smith (Peel)	Daniel Beale (The University of WA)	Jamie Dwyer (YMCA Coastal City)
2015	Chris Bausor (The University of WA)	Geoff Cock 27 (Hale)	Mike Smith (Peel)	Daniel Rayney (WASPS)	Graeme Begbie (YMCC)
2016	Chris Bausor (The University of WA)	Justin McDougall 22 (Melville) Murray McIntyre 22 (WASPS)	Rory Kerr (Suburban Nedlands)	Alec Rasmussen (Hale)	Rob Hammond (WASPS)
2017	Casey Hammond (Curtin University Hockey Club)	Liam Flynn 26 (Hale)	Ed Chittleborough (OGMHC)	Darryl McCormick (Fremantle)	Frazer Gerrard (The University of WA)
2018	Ian Smyth (Old Aquinians)	Liam Flynn 20 (Hale)	Leon Hayward (OGMHC)	Jack Welch (YMCA Coastal City)	Blake Govers (Old Aquinians)
2019	Tim Geers (Melville)	Liam Flynn 32 (Hale)	Jason Lockett (OGMHC)	Brayden King (Hale)	Matthew Swann (WASPS)
2020	Matthew Dawson (Victoria Park Panthers)	Liam Flynn 33 (Hale)	Ben Di Sabato (Whitfords)	Dane Gavranich (Westside Wolves)	Aran Zalewski (Old Aquinians)
2021	James Collins (Victoria Park Panthers)	James Day 32 (Melville)	Ben Di Sabato (Whitfords)	James Collins (Victoria Park Panthers)	James Day (Melville)
2022	Liam Flynn (Hale) Ben Staines (Melville)	Liam Flynn 40 (Hale)	Johan Durst (OGMHC)	Brodee Foster (Old Aquinians)	Aran Zalewski (Old Aquinians)
2023	Jack Welch (Fremantle - Cockburn)	Liam Flynn 57 (Hale)	Hunter Banyard (OGMHC) Ben Rennie (Fremantle - Cockburn)	Max Freedman (YMCC) Cambell Geddes (UWA)	Liam Flynn (Hale)
2024	Jake Staines (Melville)	Brodee Foster 27 (Old Aquinians)	Heath Cremasco (Mods-OGM)	Max Freedman (YMCC)	Jake Staines (Melville)
2025	Flynn Ogilvie (UWA)	Liam Flynn 38 (Hale)	Hunter Banyard (Melville) Dom Cain (Whitford)	Patrick Andrew (Westside Wolves)	Chris Bausor (UWA)
2026	Ben Staines (Melville)	Cooper Burns 35 (YMCC)	Matthew Edwards (Westside Wolves)	Max Nelson (UWA)	Angus Adamson (YMCC)

== Women's Competition ==
=== Premier League ===
Women

Premier Division One and Two - 12 teams, who play each other on a Home & Away basis covering 22 rounds, 22 matches each. At the completion of the season the Minor Premier is awarded the May Campbell flag.

Premier Division Two and Three - 10 teams, who play each other on a Home & Away basis covering 18 rounds, 18 matches each. At the completion of the season the Minor Premier is awarded the May Campbell flag.

Division Four to Division 10 - 9 or 10 Consists of 9 or 10 teams, who play each other on a Home & Away basis covering 18 rounds, 18 matches each. At the completion of the season the Minor Premier is awarded the May Campbell flag.

Following the regular season a finals series is played by the top 6 teams to determine the Premier.

Week	Final Game	Explanation	Outcomes
1	Qualification Final	A game between first and second on the Premiership Table.	Winner: Progresses to Semi-Final 1. Loser: Progresses to Semi-Final 2.
1	Elimination Final 1	A game between third and sixth on the Premiership Table.	Winner: Progresses to a Semi-Final. Loser: Eliminated from Finals.
1	Elimination Final 2	A game between fourth and fifth on the Premiership Table.	Winner: Progresses to a Semi-Final. Loser: Eliminated from Finals.
2	Semi-Final 1	The winner of the Qualification Final plays the lowest-ranked winner of an Elimination Final.	Winner: Progresses to the Grand Final. Loser: Eliminated from Finals.
2	Semi-Final 2	The loser of the Qualification Final plays the highest-ranked winner of an Elimination Final.	Winner: Progresses to the Grand Final. Loser: Eliminated from Finals.
3	Grand Final	A game between the winners of Semi-Finals 1 & 2.	Winner: Premier. Loser: Runner Up.

May Campbell pennant is awarded to the team that finishes the season on top of the premiership ladder, otherwise known as the minor premiership.

==== Total Premierships ====
Club	Premierships	Most Recent
Westside Wolves; Includes Grads Women's Hockey Club	17	2025
UWA Hockey Club	14	2016
Curtin University Hockey Club; Includes Pirates Women's & Curtin Trinity Pirates Hockey Clubs	10	2013
YMCA Coastal City; Includes Surf & Floreat Park Ladies Hockey Clubs	10	1985
Wesley South Perth; Includes South Perth Hockey Club	4	2018
Victoria Park Panthers; Includes Xavier Hockey Club	3	2021
North Coast Raiders; Includes Perth & Scarborough Hockey Clubs	2	1993
Hale	1	2020
Fremantle-Cockburn	1	1967
Suburban Lions Hockey Club; Includes Suburban Nedlands Hockey Club, Riverside Lions (formerly Subiaco Hockey Club) Hockey Club	1	2023

==== Challenge Cup ====
A mini-final is played between the top 2 teams after the completion of round 11, the winner is awarded the Challenge Cup. This competition ceased to be played after 2012 due to the tight schedule.

==== Champion Club (R & I Cup) ====
Was a knockout competition open to all clubs across the state. Inaugurated in 1978 and proved to be hugely successful in bringing together clubs from the Perth metropolitan areas with their country counterparts it ceased to be run after 1992.

==== Year by Year ====
Year	Premier	Runner-up	May Campbell	Challenge Cup
1965	Surf			
1966	Surf			
1967	Fremantle			
1968	Surf			
1969	Pirates			
1970	Pirates; Surf			
1971	Graduates			
1972	Surf			
1973	Surf			
1974	Surf			
1975	Surf			
1976	Surf			
1977	University			
1978	Graduates			
1979	The University of WA	Surf		
1980	University			
1981	Graduates			
1982	Graduates			
1983	University			
1984	Graduates			
1985	Surf			
1986	Pirates			
1987	Westside Wolves			
1988	University			
1989	Westside Wolves			
1990	The University of WA			
1991	Pirates			
1992	North Coast Raiders			
1993	North Coast Raiders			
1994	University			
1995	South Perth			
1996	Pirates			
1997	Westside Wolves			
1998	Curtin Trinity Pirates			
1999	Westside Wolves			
2000	Curtin Trinity Pirates			
2001	South Perth			
2002	The University of WA	Curtin Trinity Pirates	Curtin Trinity Pirates	
2003	Curtin Trinity Pirates	South Perth		
2004	Westside Wolves	Curtin Trinity Pirates	Curtin Trinity Pirates	Curtin Trinity Pirates
2005	The University of WA	Westside Wolves	Curtin Trinity Pirates	Westside Wolves
2006	Westside Wolves	The University of WA	The University of WA	Not Contested
2007	Westside Wolves	Curtin Trinity Pirates	Westside Wolves	Westside Wolves
2008	The University of WA	Westside Wolves	Westside Wolves	The University of WA
2009	Westside Wolves	The University of WA	The University of WA	The University of WA
2010	The University of WA	Curtin Trinity Pirates	The University of WA	Fremantle
2011	The University of WA	Victoria Park Panthers	The University of WA	The University of WA
2012	Curtin Trinity Pirates	The University of WA	The University of WA	
2013	Curtin Trinity Pirates	The University of WA	Curtin Trinity Pirates	
2014	The University of WA	Curtin Trinity Pirates	Curtin Trinity Pirates	
2015	Westside Wolves		Curtin Trinity Pirates	
2016	The University of WA	Curtin Trinity Pirates	The University of WA	
2017	WASPS	Victoria Park Panthers	WASPS	
2018	WASPS	Suburban Lions Hockey Club	Westside Wolves	
2019	Westside Wolves	Hale	Westside Wolves	
2020	Victoria Park Panthers	Hale	Victoria Park Panthers	
2021	Victoria Park Panthers	Westside Wolves	Victoria Park Panthers	
2022	Hale	Westside Wolves	Hale	
2023	Suburban Lions Hockey Club	The University of WA	Hale	
2024	Westside Wolves	UWA	UWA	
2025	Westside Wolves	Hale	Suburban Lions Hockey Club	
2026	Hale	Suburban Lions Hockey Club	Suburban Lions Hockey Club	

=== Awards ===
==== Charlesworth Medal ====
Is awarded annually to the Fairest and Best player in the women's first division competition. Umpires award one set of votes for each qualifying season game on a 5-4-3-2-1 basis with votes confidentially tabulated by Hockey WA and awarded at the Annual Dinner. The Medal is named after Ric Charlesworth, Former Captain of WA & Australia, and Hockeyroos Coach from 1994 to 2000, where he guided them to 2 World Cups (1994, 1998) & 2 Olympic Gold Medals (1996, 2000).

===== Jackie Pereira Top Goalscorer Award =====
Named after prolific West Australian and Australian Striker Jackie Pereira, it is awarded to the top Goalscorer from the Premier League regular season.

===== Just Hockey Top Goalkeeper Award =====
Is awarded to the goalkeeper from the Premier League that polls the most votes in the Chalresworth Medal.

===== Rechelle Hawkes Youth Award =====
Is awarded to the player Under 21 years of age, who polls the most votes during the Premier League regular season. It is named after former West Australian and Australian Captain Rechelle Hawkes.

===== Shirley Leece Medal =====
Is awarded to the fairest and best player from the Premier League Grand Final.

=== Roll of Honour ===
Year	Charlesworth Medal	Jackie Pereira Top Goalscorer	Just Hockey Top Goalkeeper	Rechelle Hawkes Youth Award	Shirley Leece Medal
1987		Jackie Pereira 30 (Pirates)			
1988	Kerri Richards (Westside Wolves)	Jackie Pereira 27 (Pirates)			
1989	Rechelle Hawkes (North Coast Raiders)	Jackie Pereira 26 (Pirates)			
1990	Liane Tooth (Westside Wolves)	Jackie Pereira 24 (Pirates)			
1991	Rechelle Hawkes (North Coast Raiders)	Jackie Pereira 35 (Pirates)			
1992	Lee Capes (Pirates)	Lee Capes 20 (Pirates)			
1993	Nicole Dalby (South Perth)	Jackie Pereira 20 (Pirates)			
1994	Michelle Hager (Pirates)	Danielle Ball 13 (Pirates)			
1995	Lisa Powell (Westside Wolves)	Jackie Pereira 38 (Willetton)		Nicole Mott (South Perth)	
1996	Sarah Booth (Westside Wolves)	Katrina Powell 22 (South Perth)		Candice Ringrose (South Perth)	
1997	Rechelle Hawkes (North Coast Raiders)	Michelle Andrews 28 (North Coast Raiders)		Melissa Hall (South Perth)	
1998	Michelle Andrews (North Coast Raiders)	Joanna Morton 30 (Curtin Trinity Pirates)		Denise Mounsey (YMCA Coastal City)	
1999	Liane Tooth (Westside Wolves)	Katrina Powell 16 (South Perth)		Angie Skirving (The University of WA)	
2000	Kim Walker (The University of WA)	Katrina Powell 16 (South Perth)		Amanda Calton (South Perth)	
2001	Nicole Dalby (South Perth)	Katrina Powell 16 (South Perth)		Larissa Kazakoff (Willetton)	
2002	Simone Wallington (YMCA Coastal City)	Tate Napier 15 (Harlies) Fiona Young 15 (The University of WA)		Larissa Kazakoff (Willetton)	
2003	Nicole Dalby (South Perth)	Kirsten Bremner 13 (Westside Wolves)		Renee Higman (Westside Wolves)	Emily Halliday (Curtin Trinity Pirates)
2004	Shayni Buswell (The University of WA)	Jemma Buckley 16 (Westside Wolves) Naomi Walker 16 (Curtin Trinity Pirates)		Kia Mansell (Willetton)	Michelle Hinman (Westside Wolves)
2005	Kim Walker (Curtin Trinity Pirates)	Jacqueline Pereira 17 (Curtin Trinity Pirates) Katrina Powell 17 (Westside Wolves)		Robyn Jilley (South West Strikers)	Donna-Lee Patrick (The University of WA)
2006	Shayni Buswell (The University of WA)	Katrina Powell 23 (Westside Wolves)	Roberta Tacey (YMCA Coastal City)	Kate Denning (Curtin Trinity Pirates)	Libby Charlesworth (Westside Wolves)
2007	Jayde Taylor (Westside Wolves)	Sian Smithson 27 (Westside Wolves)	Roberta Tacey (YMCA Coastal City)	Chantelle Ciallella (South Perth)	Elly Buckley (Westside Wolves)
2008	Shayni Nelson (The University of WA)	Sian Smithson 40 (Westside Wolves)	Rachael Lynch (Hale)	Kate Denning (Curtin Trinity Pirates)	Shayni Nelson (The University of WA)
2009	Lisa Eglington (Westside Wolves)	Lisa Eglington 22 (Westside Wolves)	Carla Hunter (North Coast Raiders)	Stephanie Andrews (Wesley South Perth)	Gemma Kendall (The University of WA)
2010	Kate Denning (Curtin Trinity Pirates)	Sian Nelson 19 (Fremantle)	Toni Cronk (Wesley South Perth)	Kate Denning (Curtin Trinity Pirates)	Shayni Nelson (The University of WA)
2011	Airlie Ogilvie (Wesley South Perth)	Chantelle Ciallella 17 (Curtin Trinity Pirates)	Sophie Fitzsimons (Old Aquinians)	Nisha Fernandes (Westside Wolves)	Jessica Shakes (The University of WA)
2012	Shelly Liddelow (The University of WA)	Chantelle Ciallella 15 (Curtin Trinity Pirates)	Elizabeth Duguid (Wesley South Perth)	Elizabeth Duguid (Wesley South Perth) Kandice Olivieri (Old Aquinians)	Kate Denning (Curtin Trinity Pirates)
2013	Kate Denning (Curtin Trinity Pirates)	Chantelle Ciallella 13 (Curtin Trinity Pirates)	Elizabeth Duguid (Wesley South Perth)	Georgia Wilson (Victoria Park Panthers)	Kellie White (Curtin Trinity Pirates)
2014	Georgia Wilson (Victoria Park Panthers)	Chantelle Ciallella 22 (Curtin Trinity Pirates)	Ashlee Wells (Fremantle Hockey Club)	Georgia Wilson (Victoria Park Panthers)	Penny Squibb (Curtin Trinity Pirates)
2015	Jacqui Day (North Coast Raiders)	Chantelle Ciallella 16 (Curtin Trinity Pirates)	Huia Arahanga-Doyle (Whitfords Hockey Club)	Stephanie Kershaw (Whitfords Hockey Club)	Jemma Buckley (Westside Wolves)
2016	Jacqui Day (North Coast Raiders)	Chantelle Ciallella 11 (Curtin Trinity Pirates) Elly Buckley 11 (Westside Wolves)	Jocelyn Bartram (Suburban Lions)	Georgia Wilson (Victoria Park Panthers)	Takara Haines (The University of WA)
2017	Madonna Blyth (Hale)	Kathryn Slattery 17 (Wesley South Perth)	Ashlee Wells (North Coast Raiders)	Georgia Wilson (Victoria Park Panthers)	Kathryn Slattery (Wesley South Perth)
2018	Madonna Blyth (Hale)	Kim Jong-eun 17 (Old Aquinians)	Ashlee Wells (North Coast Raiders)	Madi Ratcliffe (Suburban Lions)	Madi Ratcliffe (Suburban Lions)
2019	Rachel Frusher (Victoria Park Panthers)	Chantelle Ciallella 19 (Curtin University)	Elizabeth Duguid (Wesley South Perth)	Phillipa Morgan (The University of WA)	
2020	Jane Claxton (Victoria Park Panthers)	Penny Squibb 13 (Curtin University)	Elizabeth Duguid (Wesley South Perth)	Amy Lawton (Suburban Lions)	
2021	Madi Ratcliffe (Westside Wolves) Hayley Padget (YMCC)	Elly Buckley 14 (Westside Wolves)	Elizabeth Duguid (Wesley South Perth)	Amy Lawton (Suburban Lions)	Karri Somerville (Victoria Park Panthers)
2022	Liné Malan (Hale)	Madi Ratcliffe 17 (Westside Wolves)	Caitlin Cooper (Suburban Lions)	Maddison Fenwick (Victoria Park Panthers)	Caitlyn Templeman (Hale)
2023	Liné Malan (Hale)	Elly Buckley 19 (Westside Wolves)	Evie Dalton (Curtin University)	Elyssa Melville (Whitford)	Jesse Reid (UWA)
2024	Elyssa Melville (Whitford)	Beatriz Monger-Molowny 16 (Victoria Park Panthers)	Elizabeth Duguid (Wesley South Perth)	Elyssa Melville (Whitford)	Courtney Schonell (UWA)
2025	Madi Ratcliffe (Westside Wolves)	Madi Ratcliffe 25 (Westside Wolves)	Monique Formilan (North Coast Raiders)	Saysha Pillay (UWA)	Claire Colwill (Hale)
2026	Madi Ratcliffe (Westside Wolves)	Madi Ratcliffe 33 (Westside Wolves)	Summer Greenway (Wesley South Perth)	Georgia Hiskins (Victoria Park Panthers)	Claire Colwill (Hale)

== Ric Charlesworth Classic ==
In 2020 Hockey WA introduced the Ric Charlesworth Classic, a new domestic competition comprising the top players in the state. The tournament serves as a selection event for the Perth Thundersticks, the states team in Hockey Australia's premier domestic league, the Sultana Bran Hockey One.

=== Results ===
==== Men's tournament ====
Year	Gold Medal Match			Third and Fourth		
Year	Champions	Score	Runners-up	3rd place	Score	4th place
2020	––– Suns	3–2	––– Outbacks	––– Breakers	3–2	––– Highlanders
2021	––– Suns	2–2 (3–1 pen.)	––– Outbacks	––– Breakers	5–1	––– Highlanders

==== Women's tournament ====
Year	Gold Medal Match			Third and Fourth		
Year	Champions	Score	Runners-up	3rd place	Score	4th place
2020	––– Outbacks	1–0	––– Highlanders	––– Breakers	3–1	––– Suns
2021	––– Breakers	4–1	––– Outbacks	––– Suns	3–1	––– Highlanders
