= 2020 Women's Ric Charlesworth Classic =

Women's Ric Charlesworth Classic

Tournament details
- Host country: Australia
- City: Perth
- Dates: 25 October – 1 November
- Teams: 4
- Venue: Perth Hockey Stadium

Final positions
- Champions: –– Outbacks (1st title)
- Runner-up: –– Highlanders
- Third place: –– Breakers

Tournament statistics
- Matches played: 8
- Goals scored: 28 (3.5 per match)
- Top scorer: –– Roos Broek (3 goals)

The 2020 Women's Ric Charlesworth Classic was the inaugural edition of the women's Ric Charlesworth Classic, an Australian field hockey competition organised by Hockey WA. It was held from 25 October to 1 November 2021 in Perth, Western Australia.

The Outbacks won the tournament for the first time, defeating the Highlanders 1–0 in the final. The Breakers finished in third place, defeating the Suns 3–1 in the third place playoff.

== Teams ==
- –– Breakers
- –– Highlanders
- –– Outbacks
- –– Suns

== Results ==
=== Preliminary round ===
Pos	Team	Pld	W	D	L	GF	GA	GD	Pts	Qualification
1	–– Outbacks	3	2	1	0	9	3	+6	7	Advanced to Final
2	–– Highlanders	3	1	1	1	7	7	0	4	Advanced to Final
3	–– Breakers	3	1	1	1	5	6	−1	4	
4	–– Suns	3	0	1	2	2	7	−5	1	

Source: Hockey WA
Rules for classification: 1) Points; 2) Goal difference; 3) Goals scored; 4) Games won; 5) Head-to-head.

==== Fixtures ====
25 October 2020
13:00

Suns ––	1–2	–– Breakers
Vanderzwan 15'	Report	Collins 15'; Squibb 33'

Umpires:
Kimberleigh Todd (AUS)
Madeleine Smith-Gander (AUS)

25 October 2020
16:00

Outbacks ––	5–1	–– Highlanders
Broek 2', 11', 57'; Flynn 22'; Dowd 33'	Report	Pillay 4'

Umpires:
Sarah Allanson (AUS)
Jessica Edwards (AUS)

27 October 2020
18:00

Breakers ––	2–2	–– Highlanders
Squibb 15'; Wardrope 23'	Report	Ciallella 13'; Fitzpatrick 40'

Umpires:
Jessica Edwards (AUS)
Kimberleigh Todd (AUS)

29 October 2020
18:00

Suns ––	1–1	–– Outbacks
Gibbs 41'	Report	Leiper 14'

Umpires:
Madeleine Smith-Gander (AUS)
Tracey Fowlie (NZL)

31 October 2020
14:30

Highlanders ––	4–0	–– Suns
James 11'; Ciallella 44'; Blyth 51'; Fitzpatrick 59'	Report

Umpires:
Tracey Fowlie (NZL)
Sarah Allanson (AUS)

31 October 2020
17:30

Outbacks ––	3–1	–– Breakers
Frusher 15'; Dowd 29'; Flynn 33'	Report	Collins 54'

Umpires:
Sarah Allanson (AUS)
Briony Clark (AUS)

=== Classification round ===
==== Third and fourth place ====
1 November 2020
13:00

Breakers ––	3–1	–– Suns
Williamson 12'; Bates 21'; White 34'	Report	Reid 17'

Umpires:
Jessica Edwards (AUS)
Sarah Allanson (AUS)

==== Final ====
1 November 2020
16:00

Outbacks ––	1–0	–– Highlanders
Chilwell 34'	Report

Umpires:
Sarah Allanson (AUS)
Kimberleigh Todd (AUS)

== Statistics ==
=== Final standings ===
As per statistical convention in field hockey, matches decided in extra time are counted as wins and losses, while matches decided by penalty shoot-outs are counted as draws.

Pos	Team	Pld	W	D	L	GF	GA	GD	Pts	Final Result
1st place, gold medalist(s)	–– Outbacks	4	3	1	0	10	3	+7	10	Tournament Champion
2nd place, silver medalist(s)	–– Highlanders	4	1	1	2	7	8	−1	4	
3rd place, bronze medalist(s)	–– Breakers	4	2	1	1	8	7	+1	7	
4	–– Suns	4	0	1	3	3	10	−7	1	

Source: Hockey WA
