= 2021 Women's Ric Charlesworth Classic =

Field hockey competition

Tournament details
- Host country: Australia
- City: Perth
- Dates: 5–14 March
- Teams: 4
- Venue: Perth Hockey Stadium

Final positions
- Champions: –– Breakers (1st title)
- Runner-up: –– Outbacks
- Third place: –– Suns

Tournament statistics
- Matches played: 8
- Goals scored: 27 (3.38 per match)
- Top scorer(s): –– Liné Malan –– Jemma Buckley –– Shanea Tonkin (3 goals)

The 2021 Women's Ric Charlesworth Classic was the 2nd edition of the women's Ric Charlesworth Classic, an Australian field hockey competition organised by Hockey WA. It was held from 5–14 March 2021 in Perth, Western Australia.

The Breakers won the tournament for the first time, defeating the Outbacks 4–1 in the final. The Suns finished in third place, defeating the Highlanders 3–1 in the third place playoff.

== Teams ==
- –– Breakers
- –– Highlanders
- –– Outbacks
- –– Suns

== Results ==
=== Preliminary round ===
Pos	Team	Pld	W	D	L	GF	GA	GD	Pts	Qualification
1	–– Breakers	3	1	2	0	9	4	+5	5	Advanced to Final
2	–– Outbacks	3	1	2	0	4	2	+2	5	Advanced to Final
3	–– Suns	3	1	0	2	4	8	−4	3	
4	–– Highlanders	3	0	2	1	1	4	−3	2	

Source: Hockey WA
Rules for classification: 1) Points; 2) Goal difference; 3) Goals scored; 4) Games won; 5) Head-to-head.

==== Fixtures ====
5 March 2021
18:00

Highlanders ––	0–0	–– Outbacks
	Report

Umpires:
Sarah Allanson (AUS)
Tracey Fowlie (NZL)

8 March 2021
18:00

Breakers ––	6–1	–– Suns
Malan 18'; Pedley 36'; Rogers-Uff 42'; Byrnes 46'; Collins 57'; Leiper 59'	Report	Butterworth 43'

Umpires:
Madeleine Smith-Gander (AUS)
Sarah Allanson (AUS)

10 March 2021
18:00

Suns ––	0–2	–– Outbacks
	Report	J. Buckley 13'; Dowd 28'

Umpires:
Tracey Fowlie (NZL)
Reece Young (AUS)

11 March 2021
18:00

Breakers ––	1–1	–– Highlanders
Collins 41'	Report	Fitzpatrick 8'

Umpires:
Matthew Tate (AUS)
Madeleine Smith-Gander (AUS)

13 March 2021
15:00

Highlanders ––	0–3	–– Suns
	Report	Tonkin 4'; E. Buckley 10'; Vanderzwan 39'

Umpires:
Sarah Allanson (AUS)
Tracey Fowlie (NZL)

13 March 2021
16:30

Outbacks ––	2–2	–– Breakers
J. Buckley 13', 17'	Report	Hughes 7'; Malan 56'

Umpires:
Madeleine Smith-Gander (AUS)
Sarah Allanson (AUS)

=== Classification round ===
==== Third and fourth place ====
14 March 2021
12:30

Suns ––	3–1	–– Highlanders
Tonkin 29', 30'; E. Buckley 40'	Report	Fitzpatrick 54'

Umpires:
Sarah Allanson (AUS)
Madeleine Smith-Gander (AUS)

==== Final ====
14 March 2021
15:30

Breakers ––	4–1	–– Outbacks
Greiner 36'; Malan 45'; Leiper 53'; Cock 54'	Report	Mundy 15'

Umpires:
Tracey Fowlie (NZL)
Sarah Allanson (AUS)

== Statistics ==
=== Final standings ===
As per statistical convention in field hockey, matches decided in extra time are counted as wins and losses, while matches decided by penalty shoot-outs are counted as draws.

Pos	Team	Pld	W	D	L	GF	GA	GD	Pts	Final Result
1st place, gold medalist(s)	–– Breakers	4	2	2	0	13	5	+8	8	Tournament Champion
2nd place, silver medalist(s)	–– Outbacks	4	1	2	1	5	6	−1	5	
3rd place, bronze medalist(s)	–– Suns	4	2	0	2	7	9	−2	6	
4	–– Highlanders	4	0	2	2	2	7	−5	2	

Source: Hockey WA
