= Michael Boyce (field hockey) =

Australian field hockey player

Team Boyce Crest, UWA Hockey Club, Perth Western Australia.

Michael Boyce (born 1980 in Perth, Western Australia) is a field hockey player from Australia, who was a member of the team that won the silver medal at the 2006 World Hockey Cup.

== School ==
At school level Michael represented the Scotch College in the Public Schools Associations, 'Ray House Hockey Cup' competition. He was selected to represent the PSA Combined XI against the HOTSPURS in 1997. He was a member of the Ray House Hockey Cup winning teams in 1995 & 1997.

== Club ==
At club level Michael plays for The University of Western Australia Hockey Club (UWAHC), where he was selected at Right Halfback in the Legends Team at the club's 80th anniversary in 2004. He has represented the Club more than 250 times at 1st Grade level, and played in Premiership teams in 2002, 2004, 2005 & 2007. Michael became the club president in 2014.

== National ==
Michael has represented Western Australia at underage and open level, having played for the SmokeFree WA Thundersticks 1999–2007, including National titles in 1999, 2000 & 2002.

== International ==
Michael has represented Australia (Kookaburras) at senior and Junior (Under 21) level. He has played a total of 51 matches and scored 8 goals.

Including:
2006 Hockey World Cup Silver Medal
2006 Champions Trophy 4th
2001 Junior Hockey World Cup 5th

== Greatest Achievement ==
Michael’s most notable contribution includes his role as patron of Team Boyce, a University of Western Australia men’s hockey team that won premiership titles in 2011 and 2014.

== Family Ties ==
Father is Craig Boyce who has represented the Kookaburras.
Mother is Janis Boyce

Brother is Geoff Boyce who has represented the Kookaburras.
Brother is Steven Boyce, Australian Development squad 2005.
Sister is Fiona Boyce, SmokeFree WA Diamonds Squad.
Uncle is Grant Boyce has represented Kookaburras, including 1984 Olympic Games.
Aunt is Adele Boyce has represented Hockeyroos.
Cousin is Matthew Boyce.
