= Ric Charlesworth Classic =

Field hockey competition in Australia

- Sport: Field hockey
- Founded: 22 September 2020; 5 years ago
- No. of teams: 4
- Country: Australia
- Most recent champions: Suns (men's); Breakers (women's)
- Website: hockeywa.org.au

The Ric Charlesworth Classic is an Australian field hockey tournament.

The competition serves as a selection trial for Western Australia's representative team in the Sultana Bran Hockey One, the Perth Thundersticks.

The Suns and Breakers are the current champions in the men's and women's competitions, respectively.

== History ==
The Ric Charlesworth Classic was founded on 22 September 2019 by Hockey WA. The tournament is named after Australian hockey legend, Dr. Richard Charlesworth.

Due to the ongoing effects of the COVID-19 pandemic in 2020, Hockey Australia was forced to cancel a number of national tournaments. With no high quality competition being contested, Hockey WA formulated a new competition to showcase the best players in the state, as well as members of Hockey Australia's High Performance Program.

== Teams ==
Four teams were established for the tournament:

- –– Breakers
- –– Highlanders
- –– Outbacks
- –– Suns

== Summaries ==
=== Men's tournament ===
Year	Gold Medal Match			Third and Fourth		
Year	Champions	Score	Runners-up	3rd place	Score	4th place
2020	––– Suns	3–2	––– Outbacks	––– Breakers	3–2	––– Highlanders
2021	––– Suns	2–2 (3–1 pen.)	––– Outbacks	––– Breakers	5–1	––– Highlanders
2022	––– Highlanders	4–1	––– Outbacks	––– Suns	7–1	––– Breakers

=== Women's tournament ===
Year	Gold Medal Match			Third and Fourth		
Year	Champions	Score	Runners-up	3rd place	Score	4th place
2020	––– Outbacks	1–0	––– Highlanders	––– Breakers	3–1	––– Suns
2021	––– Breakers	4–1	––– Outbacks	––– Suns	3–1	––– Highlanders
2022	––– Highlanders	3–3 (3–1 pen.)	––– Breakers	––– Outbacks	3–2	––– Suns
