= Jacqui Day =

Australian field hockey player

Personal information
- Full name: Jacqui Bonita Day
- Born: 6 May 1992 (age 34) Mountain Creek, Queensland

Sport
- Sport: Field hockey
- Position: Midfielder
Senior career
Years	Team	Caps	Goals
2013–2015	QLD Scorchers	18	0
2016–2017	WA Diamonds	13	0
National team
Years	Team	Caps	Goals
2016–	Australia	24	(0)
Medal record
Women's field hockey
Representing Australia

Jacqui Bonita Day (born 6 May 1992) is a field hockey player from Australia.

== Personal life ==
Jacqui Day was born in Mountain Creek, Queensland, and grew up in the Sunshine Coast.

== Career ==
=== State level ===
==== Juniors ====
Throughout her junior career Jacqui Day represented her home state, Queensland, in national tournaments. In 2013, she culminated her junior career at the Under–21 Australian Championships in Darwin, and was adjudged Player of the Tournament.

Following her performance at the 2013 national championships, Day was named in a 25–player squad for the Junior World Cup, however did not make the final 18–player team.

==== Australian Hockey League ====
From 2013 until 2015, Jacqui Day played for the Queensland Scorchers in the Australian Hockey League.

In 2016, Day made the decision to represent the WA Diamonds, following a successful year in the Hockey WA Premier League Competition.

=== National team ===
Jacqui Day made her senior international debut for the Hockeyroos in 2016, during a test match against China in Perth.

Following her 2016 debut, Day was named in the Australian squad for the 2017 calendar year. Her last performance for the team came in November 2017 in a test series against Japan in Adelaide.
