= 2013 Under 21 Women's Australian Hockey Championships =

2013 Under 21 Women's Australian Championships
Tournament details
- Host country: Australia
- City: Darwin
- Teams: 8
- Venue(s): Marrara Hockey Centre

Final positions
- Champions: (Queensland) QLD
- Runner-up: (New South Wales) NSW
- Third place: (South Australia) SA

Tournament statistics
- Matches played: 36
- Goals scored: 135 (3.75 per match)
- Top scorer(s): (Western Australia) Kathryn Slattery (9 goals)
- Best player: (Queensland) Jacqui Day

The 2013 Under 21 Women's Australian Championships was a women's Field Hockey tournament held in the Northern Territory city of Darwin.

Queensland won the gold medal after defeating New South Wales 2–1 in a penalty shoot-out following a 1–1 draw. South Australia won the bronze medal by defeating Australian Capital Territory 1–0 in the third and fourth playoff.

== Competition format ==
The tournament is played in a round-robin format, with each team facing each other once. Final placings after the pool matches determine playoffs.

The bottom four teams play in the classification round. Two crossover matches are played, with the fifth placed team playing the eighth place team and the sixth placed team facing the seventh placed team. The winners of the crossover matches progress to the fifth and sixth place playoff, while the losers contest the seventh and eighth place playoff.

The top four teams contest the medal round. Two semi-finals are played, with the first placed team taking on the fourth placed team and the second placed team taking on the third placed team. The winners progress to the final, while the losers contest the third and fourth place playoff.

== Teams ==
- (Australian Capital Territory) ACT
- (New South Wales) NSW
- (Northern Territory) NT
- (Queensland) QLD
- (South Australia) SA
- (Tasmania) TAS
- (Victoria (state)) VIC
- (Western Australia) WA

== Results ==
=== Pool matches ===
| Pos | Team | Pld | W | D | L | GF | GA | GD | Pts | Qualification |
|---|---|---|---|---|---|---|---|---|---|---|
| 1 | (New South Wales) NSW | 7 | 7 | 0 | 0 | 31 | 4 | +27 | 21 | Semi-Finals |
| 2 | (Queensland) QLD | 7 | 6 | 0 | 1 | 19 | 2 | +17 | 18 | Semi-Finals |
| 3 | (Australian Capital Territory) ACT | 7 | 5 | 0 | 2 | 12 | 10 | +2 | 15 | Semi-Finals |
| 4 | (South Australia) SA | 7 | 3 | 0 | 4 | 13 | 9 | +4 | 9 | Semi-Finals |
| 5 | (Western Australia) WA | 7 | 3 | 0 | 4 | 15 | 12 | +3 | 9 | 5th-8th |
| 6 | (Victoria (state)) VIC | 7 | 3 | 0 | 4 | 11 | 10 | +1 | 9 | 5th-8th |
| 7 | (Northern Territory) NT | 7 | 1 | 0 | 6 | 4 | 25 | −21 | 3 | 5th-8th |
| 8 | (Tasmania) TAS | 7 | 0 | 0 | 7 | 1 | 34 | −33 | 0 | 5th-8th |

Source: Hockey Australia

2 April 2013

| VIC (Victoria (state)) | 1–2 | (Australian Capital Territory) ACT |
|---|---|---|
| Anderson 65' | Report | Smith 20'; Cartwright 39' |

Marrara Hockey Centre

2 April 2013

| TAS (Tasmania) | 0–4 | (South Australia) SA |
|---|---|---|
| | Report | Gibbs 26'; Welstead 28'; Rudd 37', 61' |

Marrara Hockey Centre

2 April 2013

| WA (Western Australia) | 0–5 | (New South Wales) NSW |
|---|---|---|
| | Report | M. Williams 3'; Khoury 33'; M. Rosser 37'; Watterson 48'; Hotham 55' |

Marrara Hockey Centre

2 April 2013

| QLD (Queensland) | 5–0 | (Northern Territory) NT |
|---|---|---|
| Kershaw 26'; Stone 44'; Anderson 48'; M. Fitzpatrick 51'; Cliffe 54' | Report |

Marrara Hockey Centre

3 April 2013

| SA (South Australia) | 2–0 | (Western Australia) WA |
|---|---|---|
| Sobels 2'; Gibbs 55' | Report |

Marrara Hockey Centre

3 April 2013

| VIC (Victoria (state)) | 2–5 | (New South Wales) NSW |
|---|---|---|
| Padget 18'; Barden 25' | Report | Khoury 19', 44'; Watterson 22'; M. Williams 29'; M. Rosser 57' |

Marrara Hockey Centre

3 April 2013

| NT (Northern Territory) | 1–3 | (Australian Capital Territory) ACT |
|---|---|---|
| Osborne 46' | Report | Evans 39'; Gilmore 58'; Taseska 68' |

Marrara Hockey Centre

3 April 2013

| QLD (Queensland) | 5–0 | (Tasmania) TAS |
|---|---|---|
| Hillas 26', 62'; Lammon 35'; Day 49'; Allendorf 70' | Report |

Marrara Hockey Centre

4 April 2013

| NSW (New South Wales) | 5–0 | (Northern Territory) NT |
|---|---|---|
| C. Rosser 19', 57'; Watterson 30'; Khoury 39'; Hotham 60' | Report |

Marrara Hockey Centre

4 April 2013

| SA (South Australia) | 0–2 | (Victoria (state)) VIC |
|---|---|---|
| | Report | Flack 25'; Filliponi 35+' |

Marrara Hockey Centre

4 April 2013

| QLD (Queensland) | 3–1 | (Western Australia) WA |
|---|---|---|
| Allendorf 14', 39'; M. Fitzpatrick 24' | Report | Squibb 4' |

Marrara Hockey Centre

4 April 2013

| TAS (Tasmania) | 0–3 | (Australian Capital Territory) ACT |
|---|---|---|
| | Report | Gilmore 28'; Kindon 31'; Gray 67' |

Marrara Hockey Centre

6 April 2013

| QLD (Queensland) | 4–0 | (Australian Capital Territory) ACT |
|---|---|---|
| Allendorf 20'; Cliffe 31', 33'; M. Fitzpatrick 35+' | Report |

Marrara Hockey Centre

6 April 2013

| WA (Western Australia) | 2–1 | (Victoria (state)) VIC |
|---|---|---|
| Wilson 30'; Flynn 67' | Report | Robinson 9' |

Marrara Hockey Centre

6 April 2013

| NSW (New South Wales) | 3–2 | (South Australia) SA |
|---|---|---|
| Hotham 2'; Morgan 21'; Watterson 63' | Report | Grist 4'; Nance 36' |

Marrara Hockey Centre

6 April 2013

| NT (Northern Territory) | 3–1 | (Tasmania) TAS |
|---|---|---|
| Peris 7', 40', 53' | Report | Britton 66' |

Marrara Hockey Centre

7 April 2013

| NSW (New South Wales) | 1–0 | (Queensland) QLD |
|---|---|---|
| Hayes 23' | Report |

Marrara Hockey Centre

7 April 2013

| ACT (Australian Capital Territory) | 3–1 | (South Australia) SA |
|---|---|---|
| Gilmore 17'; Commerford 28'; Evans 47' | Report | Spano 21' |

Marrara Hockey Centre

7 April 2013

| VIC (Victoria (state)) | 2–0 | (Tasmania) TAS |
|---|---|---|
| Pascoe 8', 65' | Report |

Marrara Hockey Centre

7 April 2013

| WA (Western Australia) | 4–0 | (Northern Territory) NT |
|---|---|---|
| Smith 28'; Symons 31'; Slattery 34', 51' | Report |

Marrara Hockey Centre

9 April 2013

| SA (South Australia) | 0–1 | (Queensland) QLD |
|---|---|---|
| | Report | Allendorf 42' |

Marrara Hockey Centre

9 April 2013

| ACT (Australian Capital Territory) | 0–3 | (New South Wales) NSW |
|---|---|---|
| | Report | M. Williams 10'; Watterson 34'; Khoury 43' |

Marrara Hockey Centre

9 April 2013

| TAS (Tasmania) | 0–8 | (Western Australia) WA |
|---|---|---|
| | Report | Squibb 28'; Burvill 37'; Wilson 45', 55'; Frusher 52'; Slattery 54', 59', 61' |

Marrara Hockey Centre

9 April 2013

| NT (Northern Territory) | 0–3 | (Victoria (state)) VIC |
|---|---|---|
| | Report | Hammond 38'; Pascoe 51'; Anderson 67' |

Marrara Hockey Centre

10 April 2013

| ACT (Australian Capital Territory) | 1–0 | (Western Australia) WA |
|---|---|---|
| Gray 9' | Report |

Marrara Hockey Centre

10 April 2013

| NSW (New South Wales) | 9–0 | (Tasmania) TAS |
|---|---|---|
| Watterson 16', 33'; Morgan 18', 46'; M. Rosser 35', 65'; Hotham 42'; M. Williams 44'; C. Williams 58' | Report |

Marrara Hockey Centre

10 April 2013

| QLD (Queensland) | 1–0 | (Victoria (state)) VIC |
|---|---|---|
| M. Fitzpatrick 59' | Report |

Marrara Hockey Centre

10 April 2013

| SA (South Australia) | 4–0 | (Northern Territory) NT |
|---|---|---|
| Rudd 15', 61'; Nance 24'; Sobels 35' | Report |

Marrara Hockey Centre

=== Classification matches ===
==== Fifth to eighth place classification ====
Crossover
12 April 2013
(Western Australia) WA | 5
(Tasmania) TAS | 0
12 April 2013
(Victoria (state)) VIC | 2
(Northern Territory) NT | 3

Fifth place
13 April 2013
(Western Australia) WA | 4
(Northern Territory) NT | 2
Seventh Place
13 April 2013
(Victoria (state)) VIC | 4
(Tasmania) TAS | 0

===== Crossover =====
12 April 2013

| WA (Western Australia) | 5–0 | (Tasmania) TAS |
|---|---|---|
| Burvill 20', 35'; Slattery 37', 60'; Wilson 69' | Report |

Marrara Hockey Centre

12 April 2013

| VIC (Victoria (state)) | 2–3 | (Northern Territory) NT |
|---|---|---|
| Padget 27'; Barden 53' | Report | Osborne 19'; Kerrigan 70'; Peris 70' |

Marrara Hockey Centre

===== Seventh and eighth place =====
13 April 2013

| VIC (Victoria (state)) | 4–0 | (Tasmania) TAS |
|---|---|---|
| Hammond 3'; Peskett 26'; Forsyth 43', 67' | Report |

Marrara Hockey Centre

===== Fifth and sixth place =====
13 April 2013

| WA (Western Australia) | 4–2 | (Northern Territory) NT |
|---|---|---|
| Slattery 7', 47'; Barclay 13'; Burvill 40' | Report | Ainslie 15'; Peris 50' |

Marrara Hockey Centre

==== First to fourth place classification ====
Semi-Finals
12 April 2013
(New South Wales) NSW | 4
(South Australia) SA | 1
12 April 2013
(Queensland) QLD (p.s.o) | 1 (3)
(Australian Capital Territory) ACT | 1 (2)

Final
13 April 2013
(New South Wales) NSW | 1 (1)
(Queensland) QLD (p.s.o) | 1 (2)
Third Place
13 April 2013
(South Australia) SA | 1
(Australian Capital Territory) ACT | 0

===== Semi-finals =====
12 April 2013

| NSW (New South Wales) | 4–1 | (South Australia) SA |
|---|---|---|
| M. Williams 9'; Watterson 58'; Khoury 61'; Brazel 70+' | Report | Spano 62' |

Marrara Hockey Centre

12 April 2013

| QLD (Queensland) | 1–1 | (Australian Capital Territory) ACT |
|---|---|---|
| Day 54' | Report | Evans 48' |
Penalties
| | 3–2 |

Marrara Hockey Centre

===== Third and fourth place =====
13 April 2013

| SA (South Australia) | 1–0 | (Australian Capital Territory) ACT |
|---|---|---|
| Rudd 32' | Report |

Marrara Hockey Centre

===== Final =====
13 April 2013

| NSW (New South Wales) | 1–1 | (Queensland) QLD |
|---|---|---|
| M. Williams 53' | Report | Cliffe 16' |
Penalties
| Hotham (penalty shoot-out missed); Carmichael (penalty shoot-out missed); Brazel (penalty shoot-out scored); Khoury (penalty shoot-out missed); M. Williams (penalty shoot-out missed) | 1–2 | (penalty shoot-out scored) Larosa; (penalty shoot-out scored) Lammon; (penalty shoot-out missed) M. Fitzpatrick; (penalty shoot-out missed) S. Fitzpatrick |

Marrara Hockey Centre

== Awards ==
| Best Player | Topscorer | Play the Whistle |
|---|---|---|
| (Queensland) Jacqui Day | (Western Australia) Kathryn Slattery | Tasmania |

== Statistics ==
=== Final standings ===
| Pos | Team | Pld | W | D | L | GF | GA | GD | Pts | Final Result |
|---|---|---|---|---|---|---|---|---|---|---|
| 1st place, gold medalist(s) | Queensland | 9 | 6 | 2 | 1 | 21 | 4 | +17 | 20 | Gold Medal |
| 2nd place, silver medalist(s) | New South Wales | 9 | 8 | 1 | 0 | 36 | 6 | +30 | 25 | Silver Medal |
| 3rd place, bronze medalist(s) | South Australia | 9 | 4 | 0 | 5 | 15 | 13 | +2 | 12 | Bronze Medal |
| 4 | Australian Capital Territory | 9 | 5 | 1 | 3 | 13 | 12 | +1 | 16 | Fourth Place |
| 5 | Western Australia | 9 | 5 | 0 | 4 | 24 | 14 | +10 | 15 | Fifth place |
| 6 | Northern Territory | 9 | 2 | 0 | 7 | 9 | 31 | −22 | 6 | Sixth Place |
| 7 | (Victoria (state)) Victoria | 9 | 4 | 0 | 5 | 17 | 13 | +4 | 12 | Seventh Place |
| 8 | Tasmania | 9 | 0 | 0 | 9 | 1 | 43 | −42 | 0 | Eighth Place |

Source: Hockey Australia

=== Goalscorers ===
9 Goals

- (Western Australia) Kathryn Slattery

8 Goals

- (New South Wales) Jessica Watterson

6 Goals

- (New South Wales) Nina Khoury
- (New South Wales) Mariah Williams

5 Goals

- (Northern Territory) Brooke Peris
- (Queensland) Murphy Allendorf
- (South Australia) Courtney Rudd

4 Goals

- (New South Wales) Esther Hotham
- (New South Wales) Maddison Rosser
- (Queensland) Jodie Cliffe
- (Queensland) Madison Fitzpatrick
- (Western Australia) Elysia Burvill
- (Western Australia) Georgia Wilson

3 Goals

- (Australian Capital Territory) Naomi Evans
- (Australian Capital Territory) Kate Gilmore
- (New South Wales) Georgina Morgan
- (Victoria (state)) Georgia Pascoe

2 Goals

- (Australian Capital Territory) Laura Gray
- (New South Wales) Caitlin Rosser
- (Northern Territory) Yasmin Osborne
- (Queensland) Jacqui Day
- (Queensland) Georgia Hillas
- (South Australia) Natalie Gibbs
- (South Australia) Gabrielle Nance
- (South Australia) Eloise Sobels
- (South Australia) Michaela Spano
- (Victoria (state)) Megan Anderson
- (Victoria (state)) Laura Barden
- (Victoria (state)) Sarah Forsyth
- (Victoria (state)) Nicola Hammond
- (Victoria (state)) Hayley Padget
- (Western Australia) Penny Squibb

1 Goal

- (Australian Capital Territory) Jenna Cartwright
- (Australian Capital Territory) Kalindi Commerford
- (Australian Capital Territory) Stef Kindon
- (Australian Capital Territory) Jess Smith
- (Australian Capital Territory) Tina Taseska
- (New South Wales) Lily Brazel
- (New South Wales) Greta Hayes
- (New South Wales) Cara Williams
- (Northern Territory) Sophie Kerrigan
- (Northern Territory) Tayla Ainslie
- (Queensland) Brooke Anderson
- (Queensland) Stephanie Kershaw
- (Queensland) Kazzia Lammon
- (Queensland) Jamie Stone
- (South Australia) Emily Grist
- (South Australia) Leah Welstead
- (Tasmania) Tayla Britton
- (Victoria (state)) Darcie Filliponi
- (Victoria (state)) Elizabeth Flack
- (Victoria (state)) Isabelle Peskett
- (Victoria (state)) Anna Robinson
- (Western Australia) Rachel Barclay
- (Western Australia) Kyra Flynn
- (Western Australia) Rachel Frusher
- (Western Australia) Maddie Smith
- (Western Australia) Katy Symons
