= Matilda Banfield =

Australian rules footballer

Personal information
- Born: 3 May 2005 (age 21)
- Draft: Rookie selection 2024 AFL Women's draft
- Debut: Round 5, 2025, Fremantle vs. West Coast, at Fremantle Oval
- Height: 173 cm (5 ft 8 in)
- Position: Forward/Wing

Club information
- Current club: Fremantle
- Number: 16

Playing career^{1}
| Years | Club | Games (Goals) |
| 2025– | Fremantle | 20 (5) |
- ^{1} Playing statistics correct to the end of the 2026 season.

Matilda Banfield (born 3 May 2005) is an Australian rules footballer playing for the Fremantle Football Club in the AFL Women's (AFLW), and a former junior field hockey player.

After completing high school at St Hilda's Anglican School for Girls,, Banfield was drafted by Fremantle as a rookie selection ahead of the 2024 AFL Women's draft. The niece of former West Coast Eagles player Drew Banfield, she was a talented hockey player before switching to play Australian rules football.

Banfield made her debut in the Western Derby in 2025 and held her spot for the remainder of the season.
