= Denis Reynolds =

Australian judge

Denis Reynolds was the president of the Children's Court of Western Australia. He was sworn into this position in February 2004, and took over as president from Judge Kate O'Brien in March 2004.

Reynolds was brought up in the Perth suburb of Wembley and attended local schools: the Brigidine Convent in Wembley, Marist Brothers College in Subiaco and Newman College, Churchlands.

Reynolds studied law at the University of Western Australia. He was admitted as a lawyer in 1977 and worked for a number of private law firms before becoming a magistrate seven years later, 1984, in Kalgoorlie. In 1987 he moved back to Perth and continued working as a magistrate until being appointed a commissioner of the District Court in 1997. He was President of the Magistrates' Society from 1990 until 1997.
