= Geoff Boyce =

Australian field hockey player

Geoff Boyce (born 31 December 1981) is a field hockey player from Australia.

== Early years ==
Boyce was born in Perth, Western Australia, son of Craig Boyce who was a member of the Australian national hockey team (the Kookaburras). One of his brothers is Michael Boyce who also represented the Kookaburras. Another brother is Steven Boyce, who was a member of the Australian Development squad in 2005. His sister Fiona was a member of the SmokeFree WA Diamonds squad and represented Australia. An uncle Grant Boyce has represented Kookaburras, including 1984 Olympic Games. His aunt, Adele Boyce was a member of the Hockeyroos.

At school level Boyce represented Scotch College in the Public Schools Association Ray House Hockey Cup competition. He was selected to represent the PSA Combined XI against the Hotspurs in 1999. He was a member of the Ray House Hockey Cup winning teams 1997–1999.

== InterVarsity ==
Boyce represented The University of Western Australia at the 2004 Australian University Games winning a gold medal, and was selected in the Green and Gold Hockey team.

== Club ==
At club level Geoff plays for The University of Western Australia Hockey Club (UWAHC), where he was selected at Fullback in the Legends Team at the club's 80th anniversary in 2004. He has represented the Club more than 150 times at 1st Grade level, and played in Premiership teams in 2002, 2004 & 2005. Geoff "Jiffy" Boyce is the game's record player for the first division for UWAHC in June 2014, and currently still playing.

== National ==
Boyce has represented Western Australia at underage and open level, having played for the SmokeFree WA Thundersticks between 2001 and 2007, including a National title in 2002.

== International ==
Boyce has represented Australia at senior and junior (under 21) level. He has represented his country three times at senior level, and many times at junior level, including the 2001 Junior Hockey World Cup. Along with his brother Michael, Geoff was named in the original squad for the 2004 Summer Olympics, but was not selected in the final squad.
