= Western University Games Series =

Tertiary Sports Western Australia (TSWA) is the Western Australian Inter-University competition. Competing teams represent the five WA universities, Curtin University of Technology, Edith Cowan University, Murdoch University, The University of Notre Dame Australia and The University of Western Australia.

The Universities compete in various sports for competition points towards the overall region, as well as qualification for the Australian University Games.

== Results ==
Year	Overall winner	Western Spirit Trophy	"Respect Yourself" Sportstar
1992	Murdoch University	Not Awarded	????
1993	Edith Cowan University	Not Awarded	????
1994	The University of Western Australia	Not Awarded	????
1995	The University of Western Australia	Not Awarded	????
1996	The University of Western Australia	Not Awarded	????
1997	The University of Western Australia	Not Awarded	????
1998	Edith Cowan University	Not Awarded	????
1999	Edith Cowan University	Not Awarded	????
2000	The University of Western Australia	Not Awarded	????
2001	The University of Western Australia	Not Awarded	????
2002	The University of Western Australia	Not Awarded	????
2003	The University of Western Australia	Not Awarded	????
2004	The University of Western Australia	Curtin University of Technology	Claire McLean Cycling (UWA)
2005	The University of Western Australia	The University of Notre Dame Australia	????
2006	The University of Western Australia	????	????
2007	The University of Western Australia	????	????
2008	The University of Western Australia	????	????
2009	The University of Western Australia	????	????

== Sports Results ==
=== AFL ===
==== Men ====
Year	Winner	Runner-up	'Think Before You Drink' Fairest & Best Player
2008	The University of Western Australia	Edith Cowan University	
2009	The University of Western Australia	Edith Cowan University	
2010	The University of Western Australia	The University of Notre Dame Australia	Kane Mitchell (UNDA)

=== Basketball ===
==== Men ====
Year	Winner	Runner-up	'Think Before You Drink' Fairest & Best Player
2008	The University of Western Australia	Murdoch University	
2009	The University of Western Australia	Edith Cowan University	
2010	The University of Western Australia	Edith Cowan University	Ben Purser (UWA)

==== Women ====
Year	Winner	Runner-up	'Think Before You Drink' Fairest & Best Player
2008	Curtin University of Technology	The University of Notre Dame Australia	
2009	The University of Notre Dame Australia	Murdoch University	
2010	Curtin University of Technology	Murdoch University	Hannah Van Der Wal (CURT)

=== Hockey ===
==== Overall ====
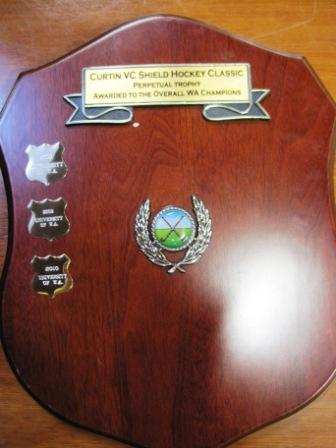
Curtin VC Shield

The "Curtin VC Shield Hockey Classic" is Awarded to the Overall Hockey Winners

Year	Winner
2008	The University of Western Australia
2009	The University of Western Australia
2010	The University of Western Australia

==== Men ====
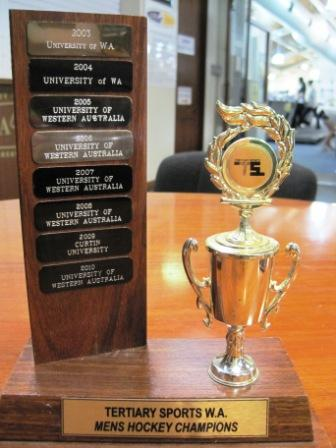
Tertiary Sports WA Men's Hockey Trophy

Year	Winner	Runner-up	'Think Before You Drink' Fairest & Best Player
1993	Curtin University of Technology	The University of Western Australia	
1994	The University of Western Australia		
1995	The University of Western Australia		
1996	The University of Western Australia		
1997	The University of Western Australia		
1998	Edith Cowan University	Murdoch University	
1999	Edith Cowan University	The University of Western Australia	
2000	The University of Western Australia		
2001	The University of Western Australia		
2002	Curtin University of Technology	Murdoch University	
2003	The University of Western Australia	Edith Cowan University	
2004	The University of Western Australia	Curtin University of Technology	Fergus Kavanagh (UWA)
2005	The University of Western Australia	Edith Cowan University	Russell Hartley (UWA)
2006	The University of Western Australia	Curtin University of Technology	????
2007	The University of Western Australia	Curtin University of Technology	Neil Robertson (Curtin)
2008	The University of Western Australia	The University of Notre Dame Australia	Jayme Walsh (UWA)
2009	Curtin University of Technology	The University of Western Australia	????
2010	The University of Western Australia	Curtin University of Technology	Chris Bausor (UWA)

==== Women ====
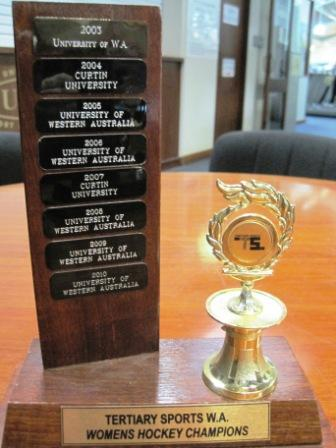
Tertiary Sports WA Women's Hockey Trophy

Year	Winner	Runner-up	'Think Before You Drink' Fairest & Best Player
1993	The University of Western Australia		
1994	Edith Cowan University	The University of Western Australia	
1995	Edith Cowan University	The University of Western Australia	
1996	The University of Western Australia		
1997	The University of Western Australia		
1998	Murdoch University		
1999	Edith Cowan University		
2000	The University of Western Australia		
2001	The University of Western Australia		
2002	Curtin University of Technology	Edith Cowan University	
2003	The University of Western Australia	Curtin University of Technology	
2004	Curtin University of Technology	The University of Western Australia	Olivia Chiu (Curtin)
2005	The University of Western Australia	Curtin University of Technology	Tania Perpoli (UWA)
2006	The University of Western Australia	Edith Cowan University	
2007	Curtin University of Technology	The University of Western Australia	Jemma Buckley (Curtin)
2008	The University of Western Australia	Curtin University of Technology	Kate Denning (UWA)
2009	The University of Western Australia	Curtin University of Technology	
2010	The University of Western Australia	Curtin University of Technology	Crystalla Georgiou (UWA)
