= InterVarsity Hockey =

Field hockey competition in Australia

- Sport: Field Hockey
- Founded: 1908 (W); 1909 (M)
- Organizing body: UniSport Australia
- Country: Australia
- Most recent champions: Sydney (W); Curtin (M) (2026)
- Website: www.unisport.com.au/sport/hockey

InterVarsity Hockey refers to field hockey competitions in Australia between rival universities, dating back to 1908. The Men's and Women's competitions were organised and run separately until 1978, when they became a 'combined InterVarsity' (held at the same time and venue), before becoming part of the Australian University Games in 1993.

== Beginnings ==
The first InterVarsity match was played in 1908 when a team of women students from Melbourne University Hockey Club traveled to Adelaide, SA, to take on a team from The University of Adelaide. The visitors were entertained with a range of activities - a concert, a dance, a drive to the hills and a skating rink evening, and even a special fire brigade practice, with Adelaide winning the contest 3-1. A return match was played in 1909 on the Melbourne University Oval, and won by the home side 3-0.

The first Men's InterVarsity competition occurred in 1909, between students from Melbourne University Hockey Club and Sydney University Hockey Club, on the Melbourne University Oval. "An invitation was received from the Melbourne University to send a team over some time during the season, which was accepted after due consideration by the committee. It is probable that the visit will take place during the June vacation and a match en route against Wagga or Wangaratta may be arranged." This match was won by Melbourne, 6-2.

== Women's InterVarsity Hockey ==
=== Early Results ===
The first two Women's InterVarsity contests (1908 & 1909) were played between Melbourne and Adelaide, with the addition of Sydney in 1910 (Note: Sydney was invited in 1909 but do not seem to have attended that year.) and The University of Queensland after World War I in 1919.

The University of Western Australia first competed in 1925 and The University of Tasmania in 1929, though both universities did not compete regularly until after World War II.

Year	Venue	Champion
1908	Adelaide, SA	The University of Adelaide
1909	Melbourne, VIC	The University of Melbourne
1910	Adelaide, SA	The University of Sydney
1911	Melbourne, VIC	The University of Sydney
1912	Adelaide, SA	The University of Melbourne
1913	Sydney, NSW	Not contested (due to smallpox outbreak in Sydney)

=== Women's Hockey Cup ===
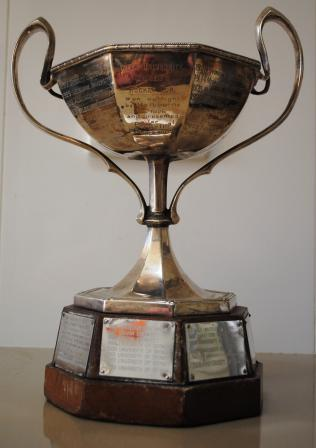
The Women's Hockey Cup

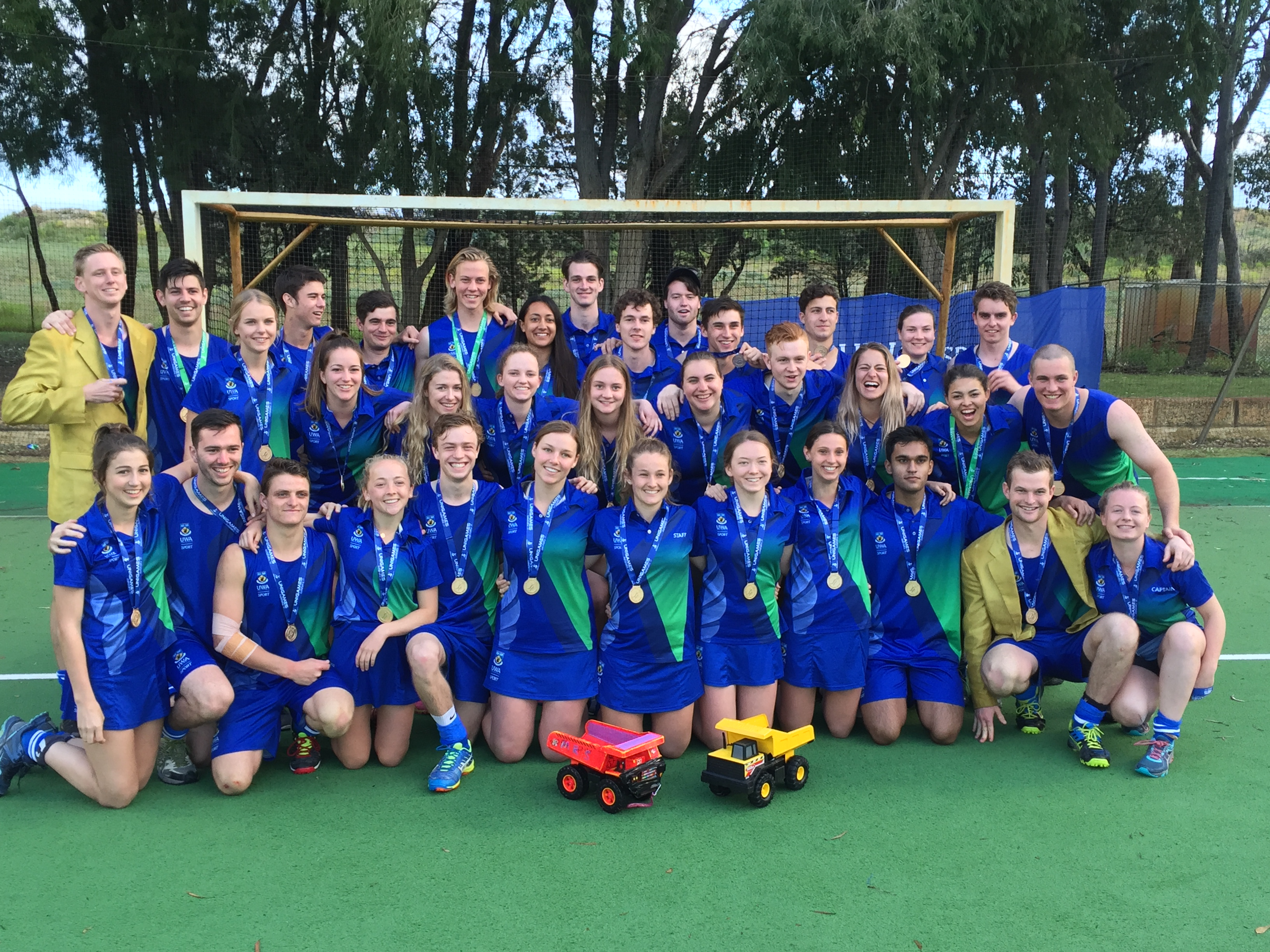
The University of Western Australia 2016 Gold Medal Winners Men's & Women's

The Women's Hockey Cup is awarded to the Champion Women's University at InterVarsity Competition.

At the 1912 tournament, it was agreed that purchase of a trophy should be arranged, and the Melbourne University Sports Union was subsequently approached to provide £5 for this purpose. It was unable to assist, but the President of the Sports Union, Professor Baldwin Spencer (who had played hockey at Oxford, and been a key figure in the creation of the Melbourne University Hockey Club), offered to "see what could be done privately".

By the time of the next contest in 1914, a 'Championship Cup' had indeed been obtained. When Melbourne won it for the seventh time in 1926, they were deemed to have won the cup outright, however the following year they presented it to be used for perpetual competition. This trophy was not returned by Sydney Uni after their 2015 win and so a generic UniSport trophy has been used since then.

The inscription reads:

INTER-UNIVERSITY

WOMEN'S
HOCKEY CUP.
Won Outright
by Melbourne
in 1926
and presented
for
Perpetual

Competition

Year	Venue	Champion
1914	Melbourne, VIC	The University of Melbourne
1915-1918		Competition suspended due to World War I
1919	Sydney, NSW	The University of Melbourne
1920	Melbourne, VIC	The University of Melbourne
1921 (Note: For an unknown reason this result is not engraved on the Women's Hockey Cup.)	Sydney, NSW	The University of Melbourne
1922	Melbourne, VIC	The University of Melbourne
1923	Sydney, NSW	The University of Sydney
1924	Brisbane, QLD	The University of Queensland
1925	Adelaide, SA	The University of Melbourne
1926	Melbourne, VIC	The University of Melbourne
1927	Sydney, NSW	The University of Sydney
1928	Brisbane, QLD	The University of Sydney
1929	Hobart, TAS	The University of Melbourne
1930	Adelaide, SA	The University of Adelaide
1931	Melbourne, VIC	The University of Melbourne
1932	Sydney, NSW	The University of Melbourne
1933	Brisbane, QLD	The University of Melbourne
1934	Adelaide, SA	The University of Melbourne
1935	Melbourne, VIC	The University of Melbourne
1936	Sydney, NSW	The University of Melbourne
1936	Sydney, NSW	The University of Queensland
1937	Hobart, TAS	Not contested (cancelled due to Infantile Paralysis Epidemic)
1938	Hobart, TAS	University of Tasmania
1939	Brisbane, QLD	The University of Melbourne
1940-1945		Competition suspended due to World War II
1946	Adelaide, SA	The University of Western Australia
1946	Adelaide, SA	The University of Melbourne
1946	Adelaide, SA	The University of Sydney
1947	Melbourne, VIC	The University of Adelaide
1948	Sydney, NSW	The University of Sydney
1949	Brisbane, QLD	The University of Sydney
1950	Hobart, TAS	The University of Adelaide
1951	Adelaide, SA	The University of Adelaide
1952	Melbourne, VIC	The University of Melbourne
1953	Perth, WA	The University of Melbourne
1953	Perth, WA	The University of Western Australia
1954	Hobart, TAS	The University of Melbourne
1955	Brisbane, QLD	The University of Melbourne
1956		The University of Melbourne
1956		The University of Sydney
1957	Hobart, TAS	University of Tasmania
1958	Perth, WA	The University of Western Australia
1959		The University of Melbourne
1960		The University of Sydney
1961		The University of Adelaide
1962	Armidale, NSW	The University of Melbourne
1963		The University of Western Australia
1964		The University of Melbourne
1964		The University of Adelaide
1965		The University of Melbourne
1966		The University of Adelaide
1966		The University of Western Australia
1967		The University of Adelaide
1968	Hobart, TAS	The University of Melbourne
1969		The University of Melbourne
1970		Monash University
1971	Adelaide, SA	University of Tasmania
1972	Armidale, NSW	The University of Sydney
1973	Sydney, NSW	The University of Western Australia
1974	Adelaide, SA	The University of Western Australia
1975	Newcastle, NSW	The University of Western Australia
1976	Melbourne, Victoria	The University of New England
1977	Perth, WA	The University of Western Australia
1978	Canberra, ACT	The University of Sydney
1979	Hobart, TAS	University of Tasmania
1980	Melbourne, VIC	The University of New England
1981	Brisbane, QLD	The University of Queensland
1982	Melbourne, VIC	The University of Melbourne
1983	Perth, WA	University of Tasmania
1984	Wollongong, NSW	The University of Queensland
1985	Sydney, NSW	The University of Queensland
1986	Adelaide, SA	The University of Sydney
1987	Brisbane, QLD	The University of Queensland
1988	Newcastle, NSW	The University of Sydney
1989	Sydney, NSW	University of New South Wales
1990	Hobart, TAS	The University of Melbourne
1991	Perth, WA	The University of New England
1992	Melbourne, VIC	The University of Melbourne
1993	Brisbane, QLD	The University of Queensland
1994	Wollongong, NSW	University of Wollongong
1995	Darwin, NT	The University of Sydney
1996	Canberra, ACT	The University of Sydney
1997	Melbourne, VIC	Deakin University
1998	Melbourne, VIC	Deakin University
1999	Perth, WA	The University of Sydney
2000	Ballarat, VIC	The University of Sydney
2001	Sydney, NSW	The University of Sydney
2002	Adelaide, SA	The University of Sydney
2003	Newcastle, NSW	The University of Sydney
2004	Perth, WA	Queensland University of Technology
2005	Brisbane, QLD	Charles Sturt University
2006	Adelaide, SA	The University of Sydney
2007	Gold Coast, QLD	The University of Sydney
2008	Melbourne, VIC	Queensland University of Technology
2009	Gold Coast, QLD	The University of Western Australia
2010	Perth, WA	The University of Western Australia
2011	Gold Coast, QLD	The University of Melbourne
2012	Adelaide, SA	The University of Sydney
2013	Gold Coast, QLD	The University of Melbourne
2014	Sydney, NSW	The University of Sydney
2015	Gold Coast, QLD	The University of Sydney
2016	Perth, WA	The University of Western Australia
2017	Gold Coast, QLD	The University of Western Australia
2018	Gold Coast, QLD	Queensland University of Technology
2019	Gold Coast, QLD	The University of Sydney
2020	Perth, WA	Not contested (cancelled due to COVID-19 Pandemic)
2021	Gold Coast, QLD	Not contested (cancelled due to COVID-19 Pandemic)
2022	Perth, WA	The University of Melbourne
2023	Gold Coast, QLD	The University of Sydney
2024 (Note: The 2024 UniNationals was unprecedentedly held outside of the Universities Australia common vacation weeks (and also during club finals for competitions around Australia), precluding many teams from participating. Its status as a legitimate InterVarsity Hockey competition is therefore questionable, and may best be viewed as a carnival akin to ‘Summer IV’.)	Canberra, ACT	University of Wollongong
2025	Gold Coast, QLD	The University of Queensland
2026	Perth, WA	The University of Sydney

=== Number of Wins ===
University	Outright Wins	Joint Wins	Total
The University of Melbourne	30	5	35
The University of Sydney	27	2	29
The University of Western Australia	10	3	13
The University of Adelaide	7	2	9
The University of Queensland	7	1	8
University of Tasmania	5	0	5
Queensland University of Technology	3	0	3
The University of New England	3	0	3
Deakin University	2	0	2
University of Wollongong	2	0	2
Charles Sturt University	1	0	1
Monash University	1	0	1
University of New South Wales	1	0	1

=== Competition format ===
The initial format was a head-to-head match between Melbourne and Adelaide. As the competition gradually expanded with the addition of the other sandstone universities, it became a simple round-robin format with the winner being the team with the most points. Whether by accident or design, the competition frequently came down to the final day of matches to determine the winner.

In 1925 Melbourne and Adelaide were tied on points, and an additional 'deciding match' was scheduled (won by Melbourne). When Melbourne and Queensland tied on points in 1936, the premiership was instead shared, but Melbourne retained the Women's Hockey Cup as they had won it the previous year. In 1946, Western Australia, Melbourne and Sydney all tied for first, with the trophy being awarded to Western Australia on the basis of goal difference (though Melbourne were the most recent winners, back in 1939).

With the number of competing universities increasing again from the 1960s onwards, the round-robin competition began to be split into two pools, followed by a knockout finals & classification series. As part of the Australian University Games, the round-robin-then-finals format has continued, but whether teams are split into pools varies from year-to-year. Also, depending on numbers the competition may be split into two divisions (based on rankings from the previous year), with the Women's Hockey Cup and overall InterVarsity premiership going to the winners of the 'Gold Medal match' in Division 1.

== Men's InterVarsity Hockey ==
=== Early Results ===
Initial competitions included only Melbourne and Sydney.

Year	Venue	Champion
1909	Melbourne, VIC	The University of Melbourne
1910	Sydney, NSW	The University of Sydney
1911	Melbourne, VIC	The University of Melbourne
1912	Sydney, NSW	The University of Melbourne
1913	Melbourne, VIC	The University of Melbourne
1914	Sydney, NSW	The University of Melbourne
1915-1918		Competition suspended due to World War I
1919	Melbourne, VIC	The University of Melbourne
1920	Sydney, NSW	The University of Sydney
1921	Melbourne, VIC	The University of Sydney
1922	Sydney, NSW	The University of Sydney
1923	Melbourne, VIC	The University of Melbourne
1924	Sydney, NSW	The University of Sydney

The annual match expanded to a triangular competition in 1924 with the addition of The University of Queensland, and then further when Adelaide joined in 1928. The University of Western Australia first competed in 1934 and The University of Tasmania in 1947.

=== The Syme Cup ===
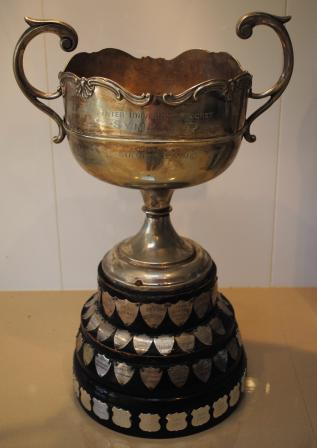
The Syme Cup

The Syme Cup is awarded to the Champion Men's University at InterVarsity Competition. It was awarded for the first time in 1925, having been donated by Sir George Adlington Syme, the President of Melbourne University Hockey Club.

The inscription reads:

INTER UNIVERSITY HOCKEY

SYME CUP
PRESENTED BY
SIR GEORGE SYME

1925

The Cup is affectionately known as "Georgie".

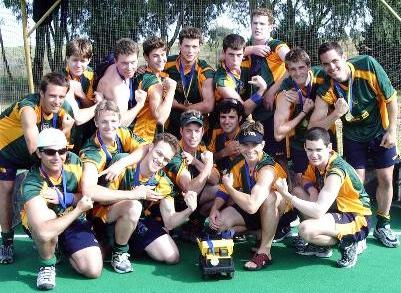
The University of Western Australia 2004 Champions

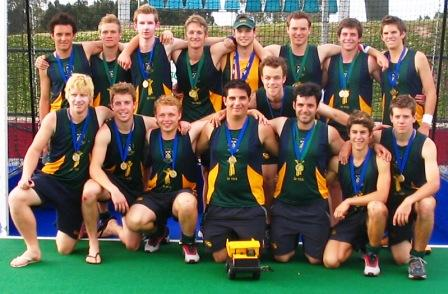
The University of Western Australia 2005 Champions

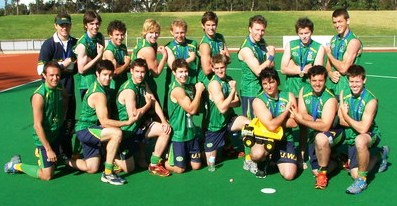
The University of Western Australia 2006 Champions

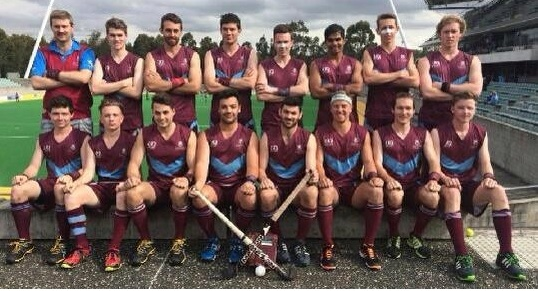
The University of Queensland 2014Champions

Year	Venue	Champion
1925	Melbourne, VIC	The University of Melbourne
1926	Brisbane, QLD	The University of Melbourne
1927	Sydney, NSW	The University of Sydney
1928	Melbourne, VIC	The University of Melbourne
1929	Brisbane, QLD	The University of Melbourne
1929	Brisbane, QLD	The University of Queensland
1930	Adelaide, SA	The University of Sydney
1931	Sydney, NSW	The University of Sydney
1932	Melbourne, VIC	The University of Melbourne
1933	Brisbane, QLD	The University of Sydney
1933	Brisbane, QLD	The University of Queensland
1934	Adelaide, SA	The University of Melbourne
1935	Sydney, NSW	The University of Sydney
1936	Melbourne, VIC	The University of Sydney
1936	Melbourne, VIC	The University of Melbourne
1936	Melbourne, VIC	The University of Queensland
1937	Brisbane, QLD	The University of Melbourne
1938	Adelaide, SA	The University of Melbourne
1939	Sydney, NSW	The University of Melbourne
1940-1944		Competition suspended due to World War II
1945	Sydney, NSW	The University of Queensland
1946	Perth, WA	The University of Western Australia
1947	Melbourne, VIC	The University of Adelaide
1948	Adelaide, SA	The University of Adelaide
1949	Hobart, TAS	The University of Queensland
1950	Brisbane, QLD	The University of Queensland
1951	Sydney, NSW	The University of Sydney
1952	Perth, WA	The University of Adelaide
1952	Perth, WA	The University of Western Australia
1953 (Note: Queensland and Adelaide tied, however Adelaide subsequently lost their position due to an ineligible player.)	Melbourne, VIC	The University of Queensland
1954	Adelaide, SA	The University of Queensland
1955	Hobart, TAS	University of Tasmania
1956	Brisbane, QLD	The University of Queensland
1956	Brisbane, QLD	The University of Adelaide
1956	Brisbane, QLD	The University of Sydney
1957		The University of Adelaide
1958	Perth, WA	The University of Queensland
1959	Melbourne, VIC	The University of Sydney
1960	Adelaide, SA	The University of Melbourne
1961	Hobart, TAS	The University of Sydney
1961	Hobart, TAS	The University of Western Australia
1962	Sydney, NSW	The University of Queensland
1963	Brisbane, QLD	The University of Queensland
1964	Perth, WA	The University of Queensland
1965	Sydney, NSW	The University of Adelaide
1966	Adelaide, SA	The University of Queensland
1967	Canberra, ACT	The University of Queensland
1968	Armidale, NSW	The University of Melbourne
1969	Hobart, TAS	University of Tasmania
1970	Melbourne, VIC	The University of Western Australia
1971	Brisbane, QLD	The University of Queensland
1972	Melbourne, VIC	University of New South Wales
1973	Sydney, NSW	The University of Queensland
1973	Sydney, NSW	University of New South Wales
1974	Perth, WA	The University of Western Australia
1975	Adelaide, SA	University of Tasmania
1976	Sydney, NSW	The University of Western Australia
1977	Melbourne, VIC	Australian National University
1978	Canberra, ACT	Australian National University
1979	Hobart, TAS	University of Tasmania
1980	Melbourne, VIC	The University of Western Australia
1981	Brisbane, QLD	The University of Queensland
1982	Melbourne, VIC	The University of Western Australia
1983	Perth, WA	Australian National University
1984	Wollongong, NSW	Australian National University
1985	Sydney, NSW	The University of Queensland
1986	Adelaide, SA	The University of Melbourne
1987	Brisbane, QLD	University of New South Wales
1988	Newcastle, NSW	The University of New England
1989	Sydney, NSW	The University of New England
1990	Hobart, TAS	The University of Melbourne
1991	Perth, WA	The University of Melbourne
1992	Melbourne, VIC	RMIT University
1993	Brisbane, QLD	Queensland University of Technology
1994 (Note: For an unknown reason this result is not engraved on the Syme Cup.)	Wollongong, NSW	University of Wollongong
1995	Darwin, NT	The University of Western Australia
1996	Canberra, ACT	University of Canberra
1997	Melbourne, VIC	University of Tasmania
1998	Melbourne, VIC	University of Canberra
1999	Perth, WA	The University of Melbourne
2000	Ballarat, VIC	The University of Melbourne
2001	Sydney, NSW	RMIT University
2002	Adelaide, SA	Curtin University of Technology
2003	Newcastle, NSW	RMIT University
2004	Perth, WA	The University of Western Australia
2005	Brisbane, QLD	The University of Western Australia
2006	Adelaide, SA	The University of Western Australia
2007	Gold Coast, QLD	The University of Western Australia
2008	Melbourne, VIC	The University of Western Australia
2009	Gold Coast, QLD	The University of Western Australia
2010	Perth, WA	The University of Western Australia
2011	Gold Coast, QLD	The University of Sydney
2012	Adelaide, SA	The University of Melbourne
2013	Gold Coast, QLD	The University of Melbourne
2014	Sydney, NSW	The University of Queensland
2015	Gold Coast, QLD	Monash University
2016	Perth, WA	The University of Western Australia
2017	Gold Coast, QLD	The University of Queensland
2018	Gold Coast, QLD	The University of Queensland
2019	Gold Coast, QLD	The University of Queensland
2020	Perth, WA	Not contested (cancelled due to COVID-19 Pandemic)
2021	Gold Coast, QLD	Not contested (cancelled due to COVID-19 Pandemic)
2022	Perth, WA	Curtin University
2023	Gold Coast, QLD	University of Tasmania
2024	Canberra, ACT	Australian National University
2025	Gold Coast, QLD	The University of Melbourne
2026	Perth, WA	Curtin University

=== Number of Wins ===
University	Outright Wins	Joint Wins	Total
The University of Melbourne	25	2	27
The University of Queensland	18	5	23
The University of Western Australia	15	2	17
The University of Sydney	12	4	16
The University of Adelaide	4	2	6
University of Tasmania	6	0	6
Australian National University	5	0	5
Curtin University	3	0	3
RMIT University	3	0	3
University of New South Wales	2	1	3
University of Canberra	2	0	2
The University of New England	2	0	2
Monash University	1	0	1
Queensland University of Technology	1	0	1
University of Wollongong	1	0	1

=== Competition format ===
The initial format was a challenge match between Melbourne and Sydney, with the title retained by the holder in the case of a draw (as in 1912 and 1919). As the competition gradually expanded with the addition of the other sandstone universities, it became a simple round-robin format with the winner being the team with the most points. In the case of multiple teams being tied on points, they would share the premiership, but the Syme Cup was still awarded on a challenge basis; If the holder was one of the joint-winners they would retain the cup, otherwise each of the winners would share custody of it over the year.

After a three-way tie in 1936, it was decided that goal average would be taken into account in determining the winner of the Syme Cup. Joint-winners continued to be declared after World War II, though it is unclear if this was a deliberate or accidental change in policy.

With the number of competing universities increasing again from the 1960s onwards, the round-robin competition began to be split into two pools, followed by a knockout finals & classification series. As part of the Australian University Games, the round-robin-then-finals format has continued, but whether teams are split into pools varies from year-to-year. Also, depending on numbers the competition may be split into two divisions (based on rankings from the previous year), with the Syme Cup and overall InterVarsity premiership going to the winners of the 'Gold Medal match' in Division 1.

== Combined University Teams ==
As an extension of the Intervarsity Hockey Championships, a representative team was typically named at the conclusion of the carnival. This was known as the Combined Universities Team, or the Australian Universities Team. In years gone by, this combined team would tour New Zealand on a biannual basis and/or play matches against the open state teams of the day. The combined team would often play the Host State's Open State team at the immediate end of the Intervarsity carnival. The last of the New Zealand Tours occurred in the 1980s. Selection in the Combined Universities Team was considered an excellent achievement and many State and even National players have been chosen for these teams.

=== 1976 Men's Australian University Sports Association (AUSA) Team ===
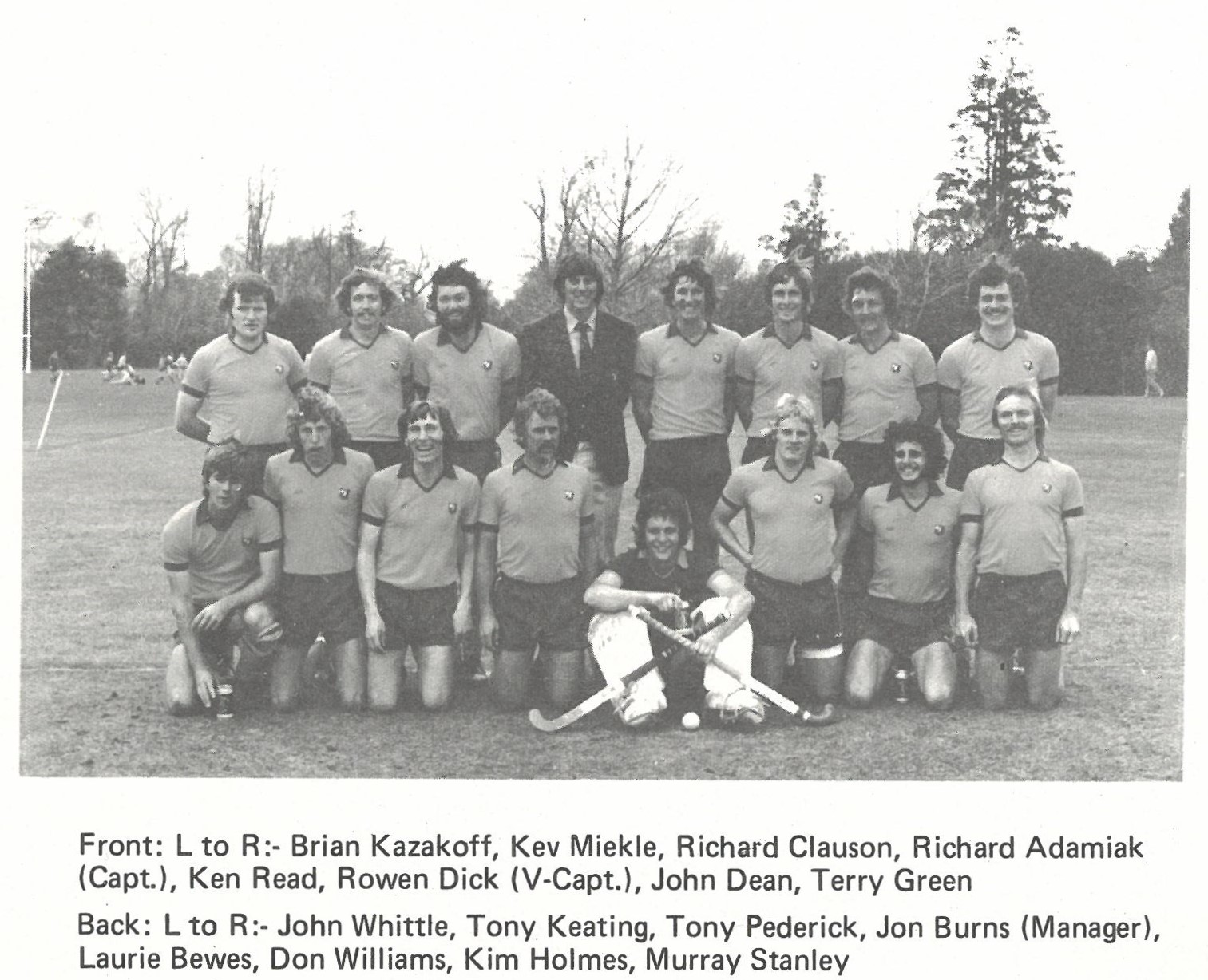
1978 Australian University Sports Association Men's Hockey Team

Name	State	Previous
Richard Adamiak (Captain)	University of New South Wales	1975
Rowen Dick (Vice-Captain)	University of Tasmania	1975
Laurie Bewes	University of New South Wales	1973
Richard Clauson	University of Tasmania	1972
John Dean	University of Tasmania	1975
Terry Green	The University of Western Australia	
Kim Holmes	The University of Western Australia	1971, 1974
Brian Kazakoff	The University of Western Australia	
Tony Keating	The University of Newcastle	1973
Kev Meikle	The University of Queensland	
Tony Pederick	Australian National University	
Ken Read	University of Tasmania	1975
Murray Stanley	University of New South Wales	
John Whittle	Australian National University	
Don Williams	Australian National University	
Jon Burns (Manager/Coach)	University of Tasmania	1969, 1971, 1972

With the advent of Australian University Games in 1993, the format of naming a 'representative' team was replaced whereby Australian University Sport would name a Green and Gold Merit team. This was essentially done under the same pretence as the Combined University Team, with the best players at the carnival chosen for what is now known as the 'Green and Gold Team'. This team, however, is ceremonious in nature only and does not compete in any matches.

== Boat Races ==
For many years, Boat Races were a formal part of InterVarsity, with heats and finals held throughout the week, and the 'West End Cup' (men) and 'Chuckle Pot' (women) being awarded to the winners.

== Summer InterVarsity Hockey ==
From 1967 until at least the mid 1980s, a 'Summer InterVarsity' for both Men and Women was also arranged, typically around Australia Day.

The inscription on the trophy reads:

INTERVARSITY
SUMMER HOCKEY

Results are engraved from 1967 until 1980. The trophy is currently held by Melbourne.

Known results:

Year	Venue	Champion
1967		Monash University
1968		The University of Adelaide
1969		Australian National University
1970		Monash University
1970		Australian National University
1971		Australian National University
1972		Australian National University
1973		Australian National University
1974		Flinders University
1974		La Trobe University
1975		The University of Adelaide
1976		Australian National University
1977		Australian National University
1978		Australian National University
1979		Australian National University
1980		The University of Melbourne
1983	Canberra, ACT	The University of Melbourne
1986	Albury, NSW	The University of Melbourne

== See also ==
- Varsity Hockey (South Africa)
