= 2017 New Year Honours =

British royal recognitions

The 2017 New Year Honours are appointments by some of the 16 Commonwealth realms to various orders and honours to recognise and reward good works by citizens of those countries. The New Year Honours were awarded as part of the New Year celebrations at the start of January and were announced on 30 December 2016.

The honours list reflected the United Kingdom's success at the 2016 Summer Olympics and Paralympic Games in Rio de Janeiro, Brazil, with sports stars dominating the list.

The recipients of honours are displayed as they were styled before their new honour and arranged by the country (in order of precedence) whose ministers advised The Queen on the appointments, then by honour with grades (i.e. Knight/Dame Grand Cross, Knight/Dame Commander, etc.), and then by divisions (i.e. Civil, Diplomatic, and Military, as appropriate).

== United Kingdom ==
Below are the individuals appointed by Elizabeth II in her right as Queen of the United Kingdom with honours within her own gift and with the advice of the Government for other honours.

- 1,197 people received honours, with 603 female
- 74% of the recipients are people honoured for services within their communities
- The oldest recipient was Janet Gillespie, 94, who received a British Empire Medal (BEM) for her charitable service. The youngest is Jeremiah Emmanuel, who received a BEM for founding a social justice charity.
- 9.3% of the recipients were people from a Black, Asian and Minority Ethnic (BAME) background.
- 8.5% of the recipients consider themselves to have a disability.

=== Member of the Order of the Companions of Honour (CH) ===
- Sir Roger Gilbert Bannister, CBE. For services to Sport.
- Sir Richard Charles Hastings Eyre, CBE. For services to Drama.
- Dame Evelyn Elizabeth Ann Glennie, DBE. For services to Music.
- Professor Sir Alec John Jeffreys, Emeritus Professor, University of Leicester. For services to Medical Research and Society.
- Helen Mary, The Right Honourable Baroness Warnock, DBE. For services to Charity and to children with Special Educational Needs.
- Shirley Vivian Teresa Brittain, The Right Honourable Baroness Williams of Crosby. For services to political and public life.

=== Knight Bachelor ===
- Professor Shankar Balasubramanian, Herchel Smith Professor of Medicinal Chemistry, University of Cambridge. For services to science and medicine.
- Antony James Beevor, military historian and author. For services in support of armed forces professional development.
- David Behan CBE Chief Executive, Care Quality Commission. For services to health and care.
- Professor Nicholas Andrew Black, Professor of Health Services Research, London School of Hygiene and Tropical Medicine. For services to healthcare research.
- Julian William Hendy Brazier TD MP Member of Parliament for Canterbury and Whitstable. For political and public service.
- John Park Campbell OBE Chairman, Glenrath Farms Ltd. For services to farming and charitable service to entrepreneurship.
- David Anthony Crausby MP Member of Parliament for Bolton North East. For parliamentary and political services.
- Raymond Douglas Davies CBE Musician. For services to the arts.
- Kenneth Arthur Dodd OBE For services to entertainment and charity.
- Mohammed Muktar Jama Farah CBE For services to athletics.
- Professor Barry William Ife CBE Principal, Guildhall School of Music and Drama. For services to performing arts education.
- Bryn Terfel Jones CBE Opera singer. For services to music.
- Professor John Vincent McCanny CBE For services to higher education and economic development.
- Donald McCullin CBE Photojournalist. For services to photography.
- Andrew Barron Murray OBE For services to tennis and charity.
- David Charles Ord. For political service and service to the community in the South West.
- David Lee Pearson CBE For services to equestrianism.
- Ian Clifford Powell, lately chairman, PricewaterhouseCoopers LLP and Member, Professional and Business Services Council. For services to professional services and voluntary service.
- David Morgan Sloman, Chief Executive, Royal Free London NHS Foundation Trust. For services to the NHS.
- Professor James Cuthbert Smith FRS Senior Group Leader, of Francis Crick Institute and lately Deputy chief executive officer, Medical Research Council. For services to medical research and science education.
- David Mark Rylance Waters, actor. For services to theatre.
- The Right Honourable Steven John Webb. For political and public service.

Diplomatic Service and Overseas List

- David Frank Adjaye OBE Architect. For services to architecture.
- Dr Jeffrey Philip Tate CBE Chief Conductor, Hamburg Symphony Orchestra. For services to British music overseas.

=== The Most Honourable Order of the Bath ===
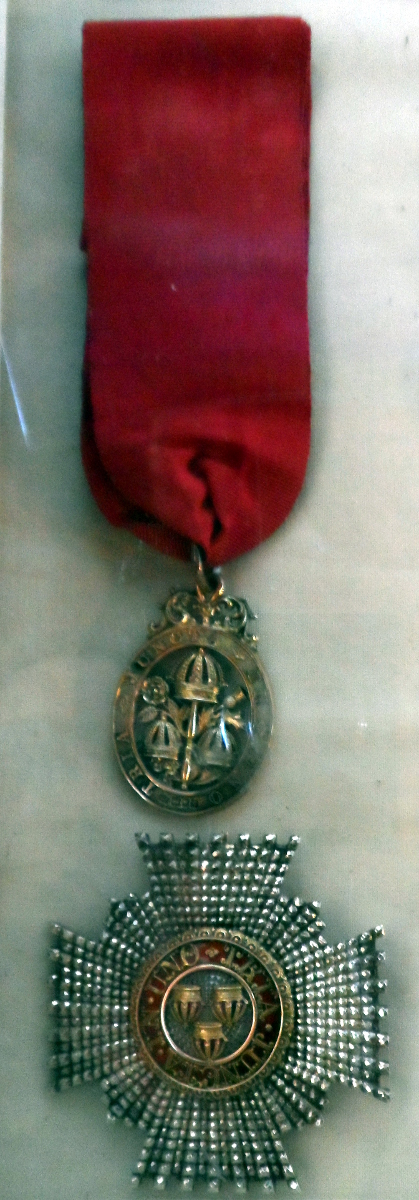
Star and neck badge of a Knight Commander of the civil division of the Order of the Bath

==== Knight / Dame Commander of the Order of the Bath (KCB / DCB) ====
Civil Division

- David Richard Beamish, Clerk of the Parliaments, House of Lords. For parliamentary service.
- Mark Andrew Lowcock CB Permanent Secretary, Department for International Development. For public service particularly to international development.

==== Companion of the Order of the Bath (CB) ====
Military Division

Royal Navy

- Major General Martin Linn Smith MBE
- Chaplain of the Fleet Ian James Wheatley QHC

Army

- Major General Richard John Cripwell CBE
- Lieutenant General Alexander James Sanson Storrie CBE

Royal Air Force

- Air Vice-Marshal Susan Catherine Gray OBE
- Air Vice-Marshal Richard John Knighton

Civil Division

- Michael Paul Bradley, Director General Resources, Defence Equipment and Support, Ministry of Defence. For services to defence.
- Sarah Church, director, Department for Environment, Food and Rural Affairs. For services to British food and farming.
- Matthew Cyrus Coats, chief operating officer, Ministry of Justice. For public service.
- Peter James Reginald Fish, Director General, Government Legal Department, Legal Adviser, Home Office. For legal services to government.
- Jeremy Fleming, Senior Management, Ministry of Defence. For services to defence.
- Professor Vernon Charles Gibson, lately Chief Scientific Adviser, Ministry of Defence. For services to defence.
- Joy Hutcheon, Director General, Country Programmes, Department for International Development. For services to international development.
- Sue McAllister, lately Director General, Northern Ireland Prison Service. For services to the Northern Ireland prison service.
- Leo Columba Martin O'Reilly, Permanent Secretary, Department for Communities, Northern Ireland Executive. For services to government in Northern Ireland.
- Annabel Clare Pillman OBE Director, Culture and Sport, Department for Culture, Media and Sport. For public and voluntary services.
- Jonathan Michael Russell, HR Director, HR Services, Department for Work and Pensions. For services to the public sector and the community in Bishop's Stortford, Hertfordshire.
- Dr Elizabeth Mary Hallam-Smith, lately Director of Information Services and librarian, House of Lords. For services to parliament and national heritage.
- Michael Stevens, lately Head, Chief Scientist Office, Scottish Government. For services to research and healthcare and to the community in Edinburgh.
- Michael Roger Williams, director, H.M. Treasury. For services to global tax policy and taxpayers.

=== The Most Distinguished Order of Saint Michael and Saint George ===
==== Knight / Dame Commander of the Order of St Michael and St George (KCMG / DCMG) ====
- Iain Macleod, Legal Adviser, Foreign and Commonwealth Office. For services to diplomacy and overseas policy.
- Professor Nicholas John White, OBE, Chairman, Wellcome Trust, South East Asia Research Units; Professor of Tropical Medicine, Oxford, UK/Mahidol University, Thailand. For services to tropical medicine and global health.

Diplomatic Service and Overseas List

- Professor Jane Elizabeth Francis, director, British Antarctic Survey. For services to UK polar science and diplomacy.

==== Companion of the Order of St Michael and St George (CMG) ====
- Professor William Phillip Aspinall, Cabot Professor in Natural Hazards and Risk Science, University of Bristol. For services to the government and community in Montserrat.
- Professor Kevin Brian Bales, director, Founder and Trustee, Free the Slaves, Antislavery International, Freedom Fund, Walk Free and International Cocoa Initiative. For services to the global antislavery movement.
- Nigel Philip Casey MVO Private Secretary for Foreign Affairs, 10 Downing Street. For services to British foreign policy.
- Ian Cameron Cliff OBE lately H.M. Ambassador, Pristina, Kosovo. For services to diplomacy, international peace and security.
- Andrew John Hulke (Hamish) Cowell, H.M. Ambassador, Tunis. For services to UK/Tunisia relations.
- Nicholas Langman, director, Foreign and Commonwealth Office. For services to British foreign policy.
- Robert Christopher Lynes, Country Director, British Council India. For services to strengthening cultural and educational relations between the UK and India.
- Harriet Lucy Mathews OBE H.M. Ambassador Mogadishu, Somalia. For services to diplomacy, international peace and security and the UK response to the Ebola crisis.
- Richard Peter Moore, H.M. Ambassador, Ankara, Turkey. For services to UK/Turkey relations.
- Steven Walter Townley, lately UK Director, United Nations Board of Auditors, New York. For services to the United Nations.

=== The Royal Victorian Order ===
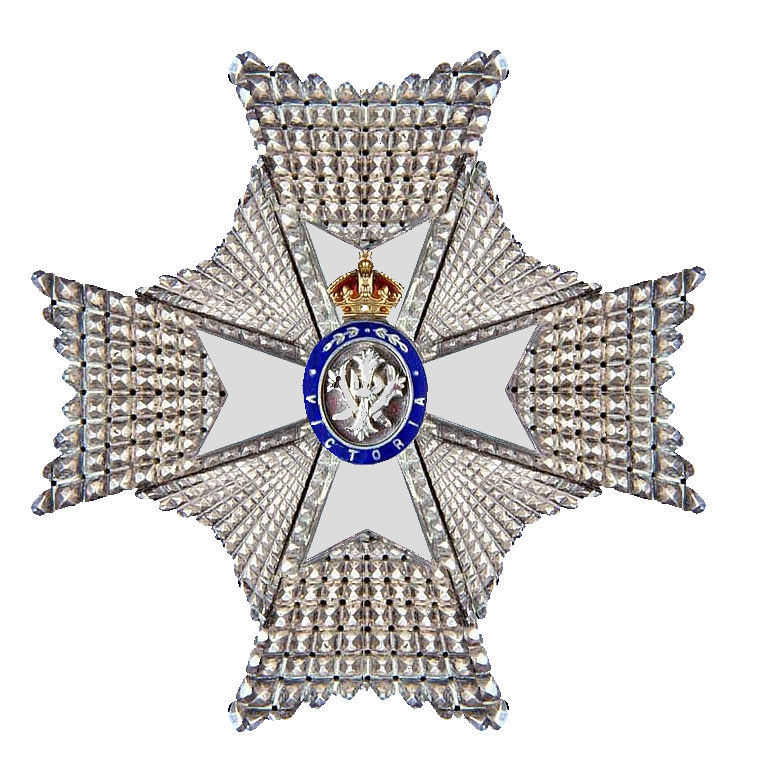
Insignia of a Knight / Dame Commander of the Royal Victorian Order

==== Knight / Dame Commander of the Royal Victorian Order (KCVO / DCVO) ====
- Dr David Kim Hempleman-Adams LVO OBE For services to The Duke of Edinburgh's Award scheme.
- Martina Jane Milburn CBE chief executive officer, The Prince's Trust Group.
- Dame Lorna Elizabeth Fox Muirhead DBE Lord-Lieutenant of Merseyside.
- Michael John Stevens CVO Deputy Keeper of the Privy Purse and Deputy Treasurer to The Queen.

==== Commander of the Royal Victorian Order (CVO) ====
- Isobel Gunning Brydie MBE Lord-Lieutenant of West Lothian.
- John Lawrence Duncan QPM Lord-Lieutenant of Ayrshire and Arran.
- Professor George Hamilton, formerly Serjeant Surgeon to the Royal Household.
- Marjory Jane McLachlan, Lord-Lieutenant of Stirling and Falkirk.
- Wing Commander Edna Felicity Partridge OBE Deputy Lieutenant and Clerk of Greater London.
- Alice Mary Prior MBE Lord-Lieutenant of the County and City of Bristol.

==== Lieutenant of the Royal Victorian Order (LVO) ====
- Lieutenant Colonel Oliver Raven St. John Breakwell MBE formerly Gentleman Usher to The Queen.
- Pamela MacDonald MVO Payroll Manager, Household of The Prince of Wales and The Duchess of Cornwall.
- Nigel Robert McEvoy MVO RVM Assistant to the Master of the Household, Operations, Royal Household.
- Paul Alexander Miller MVO IT Projects and Business Process Manager, Royal Household.
- Melissa Sarah Morris MVO Secretary, Lord Chamberlain's Office.
- Professor John Webster, formerly physician to The Queen in Scotland.

==== Member of the Royal Victorian Order (MVO) ====
- David James Benefer, RVM, Plant shop manager/flower arranger, Sandringham Estate.
- Nicholas Webster Booth, formerly chief executive officer, The Royal Foundation of The Duke and Duchess of Cambridge and Prince Harry.
- James Nicholas Geoffrey Bowden, CMG, OBE, Deputy Private Secretary for Foreign and Commonwealth Affairs to The Prince of Wales.
- Marianne Gaynor Brown, Principal Officer to the Lord-Lieutenant of Nottinghamshire.
- John McKay Carmichael, Hairdresser to The Queen.
- Kathryn Cuthbertson, Pastry Chef, Royal Household.
- Ian Donald Dietrich Eaves. For services to the Royal Collection.
- Jane Lesley Hayman, Cashier, Royal Collection Trust.
- Alan John Kingshott, Chief Yeoman Warder, H.M. Tower of London.
- Duncan Macdonald Lewis, formerly volunteer, The Prince's Trust.
- Nicholas Andrew Loughran, formerly Deputy Communications Secretary to The Duke and Duchess of Cambridge and Prince Henry of Wales.
- Lynette Dorothy Mace, Manager of Household Operations, Government House, Canberra, Australia.
- Jacqueline Elaine Mans, Pensions and Benefits Officer, Royal Household.
- Jean Marjorie Potter, Assistant Clerk to the Lieutenancy of Wiltshire.
- Gordon James Nixon Ritchie, Clerk to the Lieutenancy of Kincardineshire.
- Frances Roche, Master Saddler, Royal Mews.
- James Paul Roscoe, formerly Communications Secretary to The Queen.
- David James Rough, RVM, Deputy Palace Foreman, Buckingham Palace.
- Penelope Russell, Learning Manager, Royal Collection Trust, Windsor Castle.
- Clare Helen Julie Shaw, Clerk to the Lieutenancy of Powys.
- Sergeant Charles Henry Eric Sheppard, Metropolitan Police. For services to royalty protection.
- Douglas William Squires, OBE. For services to choreography and stage direction, royal pageants.

=== Royal Victorian Medal (RVM) ===
- Claude-Sabine Bikoro, Assistant Visitor Services Manager, Windsor Castle.
- Stephen Birrell, Bricklayer, Sandringham Estate.
- Alister James Brown, Team Supervisor, Valley Gardens, Windsor Great Park.
- Alan Graham, Building Services Technician, Property Section.
- Ramon Ricardo Jagdeo, Postman, Buckingham Palace.
- Christopher John Lambert Maddock, formerly Gentleman of the Choir, Hampton Court Palace.
- Daniel Julian Partridge, Digital Imager, Royal Collection Trust.
- Gerald Henry Sharp, Fire Surveillance Officer, Windsor Castle.
- Philip Henry Wilson, Yeoman Warder, H.M. Tower of London.

Honorary

- Teresa Sanz. For personal services to The Queen.

==== Bar to the Royal Victorian Medal (RVM*) ====
- David Arthur Pithers RVM Gatekeeper, Home Park, Windsor.

=== The Most Excellent Order of the British Empire ===
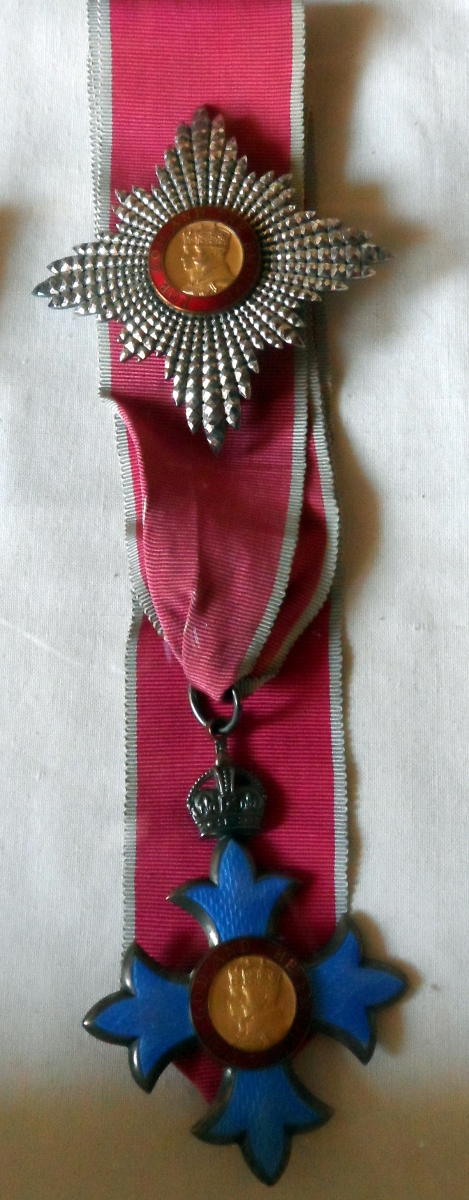
Insignia of a Knight Commander of the Order of the British Empire

==== Knight / Dame Grand Cross of the Order of the British Empire (GBE) ====
Civil Division

- Professor Sir Cyril Chantler, Emeritus Professor Guy's, King's, and St. Thomas's Medical School. For services to leadership in healthcare.

==== Knight / Dame Commander of the Order of the British Empire (KBE / DBE) ====
Military Division

Royal Air Force

- Air Marshal Richard Frank Garwood CB CBE DFC
- Air Marshal Graham Edward Stacey CB MBE

Civil Division

- Professor Elizabeth Nneka Anionwu, CBE, Emeritus Professor of Nursing, University of West London. For services to nursing and the Mary Seacole Statue Appeal.
- Vera Baird, Northumbria Police and Crime Commissioner. For services to women and equality.
- Inga Kristine Beale, chief executive officer, Lloyd's of London. For services to the economy.
- Professor Henrietta Miriam Ottoline Leyser Day, CBE, Director, The Sainsbury Laboratory, University of Cambridge. For services to plant science, science in society and equality and diversity in science.
- Professor Amanda Gay Fisher, director, Medical Research Council Clinical Sciences Centre, Imperial College London. For services to medical research and the public understanding of science.
- Helen Jean Sutherland Fraser, CBE, lately Chief Executive, The Girls' Day School Trust. For services to education.
- Dr Katherine Jane Grainger, CBE. For services to sport and charity.
- Jessica Ennis-Hill, CBE. For services to athletics.
- The Right Reverend James Stuart Jones. For services to bereaved families and justice.
- Katherine Patricia Routledge, CBE. For services to theatre and charity.
- Professor Caroline Leigh Watkins, Professor of Stroke and Older People's Care, College of Health and Wellbeing, University of Central Lancashire. For services to nursing and older people's care.

Diplomatic Service and Overseas List

- Anna Wintour, OBE, Editor-in-Chief, American Vogue and Creative Director, Condé Nast. For services to fashion and journalism.

==== Commander of the Order of the British Empire (CBE) ====
Military Division

Royal Navy

- Rear Admiral Christopher Reginald Summers Gardner
- Commodore Inga Jane Kennedy, Queen Alexandra's Royal Naval Nursing Service
- Rear Admiral Graeme Angus MacKay

Army

- Colonel Andrew John Pooler Barr OBE
- Brigadier Jeremy Matthew James Bennett OBE
- Brigadier Andrew Michael Cliffe
- Brigadier Ludwig Karl Ford MBE
- Brigadier Andrew Gordon Hughes MBE

Royal Air Force

- Group Captain Damian Robert Alexander
- Group Captain Richard Paul Barrow OBE
- Air Commodore Keith Hugh Robert Bethell

Civil Division

- Cecilia Akrisie Anim, President, Royal College of Nursing and clinical nurse specialist in women's health. For services to women's health.
- Naim Ibrahim Attallah, publisher, Quartet Books. For services to literature and the arts.
- Chris Brian Austin, Country Director, Afghanistan, Department for International Development. For services to international development.
- Professor Polina Bayvel, Professor of Optical Communications and Networks, University College London. For services to engineering.
- Hardip Singh Begol, director, Independent Education, Safeguarding in Schools and Counter Extremism, Department for Education. For services to education.
- Professor Kamaldeep Singh Bhui, Professor of Cultural Psychiatry and Epidemiology, Wolfson Institute of Preventative Medicine, Queen Mary University of London. For services to mental healthcare.
- Dr Desmond Rollo Biddulph, President and Member, Buddhist Society. For services to interfaith relations.
- Sue-Anne Hilbre Biggs, Director General, Royal Horticultural Society. For services to the environment and ornamental horticulture industry.
- Rosaleen Mary Blair, founder, Alexander Mann Solutions. For services to business and recruitment.
- Michael Neil Murray Boyd, lately managing director, Investment, UK Trade and Investment, Department for International Trade. For services to international business.
- Marie Brennan, Crown Commercial Leader, Cabinet Office. For services to commercial capability in the public sector.
- Peter Brookes, cartoonist. For services to the media.
- Professor Richard Burdett, Professor of Architecture and Urban Studies, London School of Economics. For services to urban planning and design.
- Clare Beatrice Chamberlain, Director of Children's Services, Hammersmith and Fulham, Kensington and Chelsea, and City of Westminster. For services to children and families.
- Professor Paul Charles Cheshire, economist. For services to economics and housing.
- Sophie Margaret Christiansen OBE. For services to para-equestrianism.
- Andrew George Christie, lately Director of Children's Services, Triborough (Hammersmith and Fulham, Kensington and Chelsea and Westminster Local Authorities). For services to children.
- Professor Jack Martin Cuzick, Director, Wolfson Institute of Preventive Medicine and Head, Centre for Cancer Prevention. For services to cancer prevention and screening.
- Professor Susan Catherine Deacon, Chair, Institute of Directors in Scotland and Assistant Principal, University of Edinburgh. For services to business, education and public service.
- Professor Michael Harold Depledge, Chair of Environment and Human Health, University of Exeter Medical School. For services to the environment and human health.
- Kim Daniel Bromley-Derry, Chief Executive, London Borough of Newham. For services to local government.
- Stephen Roderick Dodgson, lately Head of Business Group, UK Export Finance, Department for International Trade. For services to the British export economy.
- Philip James Duffy, chief operating officer, Border Force, Home Office. For services to immigration policy and border security.
- Charlotte Susan Jane Dujardin OBE. For services to equestrianism.
- Gerard Elias QC, Commissioner for Standards, National Assembly for Wales. For services to standards of conduct in public life.
- Ronald Victor Emerson, lately chairman, British Business Bank. For services to international banking and the financing of small and medium-sized enterprises.
- Dr Andrew Douglas Garrad. For services to renewable energy.
- Robert Michael Gilbert, Chair, Intellectual Property Office. For services to the legal profession and the economy.
- Neena Gill, Member of the European Parliament for the West Midlands. For parliamentary and political service.
- Professor Peter John Goodhew, Emeritus Professor of Engineering, University of Liverpool. For services to engineering and education.
- Rupert Goold, artistic director, Almeida Theatre. For services to drama.
- Ravindra Pragji Govindia MBE, Leader, Wandsworth Borough Council. For services to local government and the community in Wandsworth, London.
- Professor Anthony Clifford Grayling. For services to philosophy.
- Professor Christopher Haslett OBE FRSE, Sir John Crofton Professor of Respiratory Medicine and director, Queen's Medical Research Institute, University of Edinburgh. For services to medical research.
- Helena Rebecca Herklots, Chief Executive, Carers UK. For services to carers.
- Anya Hindmarch MBE, Fashion Accessories Designer. For services to fashion.
- Alfred Henry Hitchcock QPM, Chief Constable, Ministry of Defence Police. For services to defence and policing.
- Councillor David Hodge, leader, Surrey County Council and vice-chairman, Local Government Association. For services to local government and charity.
- Edmund Nigel Ronald Hosker, lately Director, International Energy, EU and Resilience, Department of Energy and Climate Change. For services to energy policy.
- Shirley Hughes OBE, Author and Illustrator. For services to literature.
- Dr Stephen Charles Inglis, lately Director, National Institute for Biological Standards and Control, Medicines and Healthcare Products Regulatory Agency. For services to health protection.
- Amanda Jeffery, Deputy Director, Judicial Office of England and Wales. For services to the administration of justice and the judiciary.
- Dominic Johnson, Associate Treasurer, Conservative Party. For political service.
- Roselyn Christine Jones, Mayor, Doncaster Council. For services to local government.
- Professor Janice Margaret Kay, Provost and Senior Deputy Vice-Chancellor, University of Exeter. For services to higher education.
- Jason Francis Kenny OBE. For services to cycling.
- Laura Rebecca Kenny OBE. For services to cycling.
- Sascha Kindred OBE. For services to swimming.
- Professor Nicola Mary Lacey FBA, School Professor of Law, Gender and Social Policy, London School of Economics. For services to law, justice and gender politics.
- Angela Macdonald, director, DWP Operations, Department for Work and Pensions. For services to welfare reform.
- Mark Malcomson, Principal and Chief Executive, City Lit. For services to adult education.
- Dr Jane Elizabeth Martin, Local Government Ombudsman and Chair, Commission for Local Administration in England. For services to administrative justice and transparency in local government.
- Professor Paul William Martin, Depute Principal, University of the West of Scotland. For services to healthcare and education.
- Professor Colin Peter Mayer, Member, Competition Appeal Tribunal. For services to business education and the administration of justice in the economic sphere.
- Dr Donald McCarthy. For services to business and philanthropy.
- Derek Andrew McClure. For services to mental healthcare and people with learning disabilities.
- Gerard McGinn, Chairman, Strategic Investment Board. For services to the Northern Ireland economy.
- Oliver Charles Fenton Morley, Chief Executive, Driver and Vehicle Licensing Agency. For services to public sector digital services.
- The Right Honourable Francis Mulholland QC, lately Lord Advocate. For services to law in Scotland.
- Malcolm Newsam, lately Children's Social Care Commissioner, Rotherham Metropolitan Borough Council. For services to children's social care.
- Seamus Michael Oates, chief executive officer and Executive Headteacher, Tri-borough Alternative Provision Multi Academy Trust. For services to education.
- Chris Ofili, Artist. For services to art.
- Professor Jill Pell FRSA, Henry Mechan Professor of Public Health, University of Glasgow. For services to public health research.
- Roger John Pope, Chief Executive Officer, Academies South West Multi Academy Trust and Executive Principal, Kingsbridge Community College, Devon. For services to education.
- Michael Patrick Pragnell, Chairman, Cancer Research UK. For services to cancer research.
- Professor John Adrian Pyle, Professor of Chemistry and 1920 Chair for Physical Chemistry, Cambridge University. For services to atmospheric chemistry and environmental science.
- Timothy Robert Reddish OBE, Chair, British Paralympic Association. For services to sport.
- Nigel Paul Richardson, lately Director of Children's Services, Leeds City Council. For services to children and families.
- Angela May Rippon OBE, Development Lead, Dementia Friendly Communities. For services to dementia care.
- Luke Philip Hardwick Rittner, Chief Executive, Royal Academy of Dance. For services to the arts, particularly dance.
- Justine Juliette Alice Roberts, co-founder and chief executive officer, Mumsnet and Gransnet. For services to the economy.
- Paul Rowsell, Deputy Director, Democracy, Department for Communities and Local Government. For services to local government.
- Anne Richardson Sharp, Chief Executive, Advisory, Conciliation and Arbitration Service. For services to workplace relations.
- Dr Christopher John Simpkins, Director General, The Royal British Legion. For services to the Armed Forces community.
- Jeremy Theodorson Sinclair, Chairman, M&C Saatchi. For services to advertising.
- Nicholas David Skelton OBE. For services to equestrianism.
- Professor Carol Christine Smart, Professor Emerita of Sociology, University of Manchester and lately Co-Director, Morgan Centre for the Study of Relationships and Personal Life. For services to the social sciences.
- Professor David Burton Smith, writer, broadcaster and arts administrator. For services to culture and the arts in Wales.
- Professor John Rason Spencer QC, Professor Emeritus, University of Cambridge. For services to the reform of law concerning child witnesses.
- Lesley Sundstrom, Senior Management, Ministry of Defence. For services to defence.
- Professor Anita Thapar, Clinical Professor, Institute of Psychological Medicine and Clinical Neurosciences, Cardiff University. For services to child and adolescent psychiatry.
- Professor Hywel Rhys Thomas. For services to academic research and higher education.
- Jennifer Waldman, director, 14–18 NOW, Imperial War Museum. For services to the arts.
- Simon Edward John Walker, lately Director General, Institute of Directors. For services to business and the economy.
- William Graeme Wallace, director, DWP Operations, Department for Work and Pensions. For services to pensioners and welfare reform.
- Professor Geraldine Walters, lately Director of Nursing and Midwifery, King's College Hospital NHS Foundation Trust. For services to nursing and midwifery.
- Dr David Watson, director, IBM Research UK. For services to science and engineering research.
- Edward Webb, lately Deputy Director, Tissue, Embryology, Donation and Sponsorship, Department of Health. For services to health science.
- Professor Peter Leslie Weissberg, lately Medical Director, British Heart Foundation. For services to medical research and cardiovascular health.
- Professor Steven George West, Vice-Chancellor, University of the West of England. For services to higher education.
- Dr Margaret Ann Whalley MBE, lately Director of Research, Training and Development, Pen Green Training and Development Centre, Corby, Northamptonshire. For services to education.
- Dr Margo Lorraine Whiteford, Chair, Spina Bifida Hydrocephalus Scotland. For services to healthcare and charity.
- Richard Thomas George Winter. For voluntary services to international development through Save the Children and Merlin.
- Professor Guang-Zhong Yang, director, Hamlyn Centre for Robotic Surgery. For services to biomedical engineering.

Diplomatic Service And Overseas List

- Dr Edgar John Hughes, Chairman, Marshall Aid Commemoration Committee. For services to the Marshall Aid Commemoration Commission.

==== Officer of the Order of the British Empire (OBE) ====
Military Division

Royal Navy

- Commodore Alistair John Adams
- Commander Alastair Neil Spencer Graham MVO
- Captain (now Commodore) Thomas Edward Manson
- Captain Philip Kenneth Milburn
- Captain Simon Richard Petitt
- Commander Judith Helen Terry
- Commander Mark Adrian Williams

Army

- Colonel Graham Nicholas Addley
- Lieutenant Colonel Richard MacGregor Crombie, Royal Corps of Signals, Army Reserve
- Colonel Jason Saul Etherington
- Lieutenant Colonel Andrew Stuart Garner MBE The Yorkshire Regiment
- Lieutenant Colonel Ingrid Elizabeth Hall, Adjutant General's Corps (Educational and Training Services Branch)
- Colonel Richard Maurice Hayhurst
- Lieutenant Colonel Andrew Charles Rule Heywood, Royal Tank Regiment
- Lieutenant Colonel Toby Alfred Warde Ingram MBE The Royal Regiment of Scotland
- Lieutenant Colonel James Ryan Knight MBE Royal Corps of Signals
- Lieutenant Colonel Glyn David Cledwyn Llewellyn, The Royal Welsh
- Lieutenant Colonel Nathan Magunda Sempala-Ntege, Royal Regiment of Artillery

Royal Air Force

- Group Captain Andrew Charles Gudgeon
- Wing Commander Nicholas John Knight
- Group Captain James Grant Leggate
- Group Captain Clive Andrew Montellier
- Group Captain Daniel Jonathan Storr
- Wing Commander Duncan Joseph George Stubbs

Civil Division

- Jane Acklam, Executive Principal and chief executive officer, Moor End Academies Trust. For services to education.
- Gail Adams, Head of Nursing, UNISON. For services to nursing and public healthcare.
- Nicola Adams MBE For services to boxing.
- Diane Aderyn, Director of Finance and Commercial Services, University of Bath. For services to higher education.
- Susan Victoria Mary Aglionby DL For services to young people and the community in Cumbria.
- Rosalind Margaret Alstead, Director of Nursing and Clinical Standards, Oxford Health NHS Foundation Trust. For services to nursing.
- Professor Vidal Ashkenazi, Founding Director and chief executive officer, Nottingham Scientific Ltd. For services to science.
- Iman Abou-Atta, Founder, SCEME. For services to community cohesion.
- Sally Elizabeth Bacon. For services to culture and young people.
- Joe Baden, Founder, Open Book Project. For services to higher education.
- Susan Baker, director, Time to Change. For services to mental health.
- Stephen Neville Bates, Chief Executive, Bioindustry Association. For services to innovation.
- Sheila Anne Battersby, Senior Policy Adviser, Cabinet Office. For services to civil society and community action in the north west of England.
- Alison Sarah Baum, Founder and chief executive officer, Best Beginnings. For services to tackling child health inequalities.
- Alison Linda Beane, Executive Headteacher, Mary Rose Academy, Cliffdale Primary Academy and Redwood Park Academy, Portsmouth and director, Solent Academies Trust. For services to education.
- Jenny Beavan, costume designer. For services to drama production.
- Victoria Caroline Beckham, fashion designer. For services to the fashion industry.
- Susan Margaret Bennett, Head, St. Thomas Centre Nursery School, Birmingham. For services to education.
- Professor Jacqueline Dunkley-Bent, Head of Maternity, NHS England. For services to midwifery.
- Abdul Fazal Bhanji, Deputy Chair, University of London Board of Trustees. For services to education and young people.
- Christopher Blythe, Chief Executive, Chartered Institute of Building, Bracknell. For services to the construction industry and government.
- Lynda Ann Bonner, Founder, National Nursing and Midwifery Nursing Network. For services to the treatment of venous thromboembolism.
- Eleanor Deirdre Brazil, Children's Services Commissioner, Slough. For services to children's social care.
- Sarah Elizabeth Brennan, Chief Executive, Young Minds. For services to children and young people's mental health.
- Patrick Brill, artist. For services to the arts.
- Sonia Penny Briscoe MBE Chef de Mission, Rio 2016 Paralympic Games. For services to sport.
- Sharon Marie Broome, Principal Forensic Investigator, Defence Science and Technology Laboratory. For services to defence.
- Sarah Browne, Assistant Director, South Eastern Health and Social Care Trust. For services to the social care sector in Northern Ireland.
- Colin Edward Jarrom Bryan, chief executive officer, Drayton Manor Theme Park. For services to charity and the community in Staffordshire.
- Trevor Arthur Stanley Buchanan, Consultant Ophthalmic Surgeon, Royal Victoria Hospital Belfast. For services to healthcare in Northern Ireland and voluntary medical service in South Sudan.
- Dr Bernard Joseph Bulkin. For services to the energy industry.
- Julie Beverly Bullous, lately Executive Headteacher, Federation of Mary Howard and St. Andrew's Primary School, Tamworth, Staffordshire. For services to education.
- Joanna Briant Burgess, Principal and Founder, Blossom House School, London. For services to children with special educational needs and disabilities.
- Professor Claire Sorrel Callender, Professor of Higher Education Policy, Birkbeck University of London and Professor of Higher Education Studies, UCL Institute of Education. For services to education.
- James Ronald Carr. For services to conservation, education and the community in Cumbria.
- Michael Douglas Carr, lately board member, Innovate UK and non-executive director, Ordnance Survey. For services to innovation.
- Michael Cavanagh. For services to sport and the Commonwealth Games movement.
- Kathryn Cearns, lately Chair, Financial Reporting Advisory Board. For voluntary services to government financial reporting.
- Emma Jane Mary Chamberlain, Barrister and Author. For services to government tax policy.
- Dr Steven William Chase, Director of People, Thames Valley Police. For services to policing.
- Edward Clancy MBE For services to cycling.
- Dr Jonathan Clark, Executive Headteacher, Beckmead Family of Schools, Croydon. For services to children with special educational needs and disabilities.
- Christopher Patrick Coleman, Manager, Wales national football team. For services to football.
- Kim Lucille Considine, lately Head of North West Protected Persons Service, TITAN Regional Organised Crime Unit. For services to vulnerable victims and witnesses.
- Christopher John Cook, Chairman, Lincolnshire Local Safeguarding Children Board. For services to children.
- Janet Cooper, Partner, Tapestry Compliance. For services to equality, women's empowerment and employee share ownership.
- Teresa Ann Cooper, Grade 7, Ministry of Defence. For services to defence acquisition.
- Donna Alison Cornwell, Associate Headteacher, Swaffham Bulbeck Church of England Primary School, Cambridge. For services to education.
- Stuart John Cornwell, Chair, A Way Out, and Chair, Spurgeons Child Care and Chair of the Advisory Panel, Safe Families for Children. For services to children and families.
- Charles Counsell, Executive Director, Automatic Enrolment, The Pensions Regulator. For services to workplace pension reform.
- Angela Mary Cox, Diocesan Director for Education, Roman Catholic Diocese of Leeds. For services to education.
- Christine Janette Craik, Director of Occupational Therapy, Brunel University. For services to occupational therapy, particularly mental health services and education.
- Dr Helen Mary Crews, lately Director, Animal and Plant Health Agency. For services to plant and bee health and voluntary services to the community in York.
- Jody Alan Cundy MBE For services to cycling and swimming.
- Professor Valentine David Cunningham, lately Professor of English Language and Literature, Corpus Christi College Oxford. For services to services to scholarship and understanding of humanities.
- Arthur Terry Dafter, lately Director of Adult Social Care, Stockport Council. For services to children's and adult social care.
- Dr Siriol David (Siriol Chapman), lately Head of Forensic Psychological Services, National Offender Management System Wales. For services to offender management.
- Ian Norman Dodds, Senior Policy Adviser, Cabinet Office. For services to civil society and community action in the north east of England.
- Anne Marie Duffy, lately Director of Qualifications, Council for the Curriculum, Examinations and Assessment. For services to education in Northern Ireland.
- Anne Patricia Dunham MBE For services to para-equestrianism.
- Professor Mary Elizabeth Dunning, lately Governor, Tyne Metropolitan College. For services to further and higher education and the community in the north east of England.
- Ciara Eastell, lately President, Society of Chief Librarians. For services to public libraries.
- Dr Carole Easton. For services to young people.
- Toby Hal Michael Eccles, Social Investor and Founder, Social Finance. For services to social enterprise and investment and charity.
- Dr Katy Emck, Founding Director, Fine Cell Work. For services to the rehabilitation of offenders.
- Jonathan Mark England, Chef de Mission, Team GB and Director of Sport, British Olympic Association. For services to sport.
- Professor Gene Solomon Feder, General Practitioner, Helios Medical Centre, Bristol and Professor of Primary Care, University of Bristol. For services to healthcare and victims of domestic abuse.
- Amanda Foister, chief executive officer, Longridge Activity Centre, Buckinghamshire. For services to young people.
- Aminatta Forna, author. For services to literature.
- Jennifer Fowler, Senior Advisory Lawyer, Upper Tribunal (Administrative Appeals Chamber) H.M. Courts and Tribunal Service. For services to the administration of justice.
- Alexander Clive Fox, chief executive officer, Shared Lives Plus. For services to social care.
- Peter Alan Fox, leader, Monmouthshire County Council. For services to Cardiff capital region.
- Michael John Foy, Regional Head for the Midlands and North West, Free Schools Capital Division, Education Funding Agency. For services to education.
- Professor Simon Webster Frith, Tovey Professor of Music, University of Edinburgh. For services to higher education and popular music.
- Professor John Anthony Furlong, Emeritus Professor of Education, Oxford University and Expert Initial Teacher Education Adviser for Wales. For services to research in education and government.
- Brian John Russell Gale, Director of Policy and Campaigns, National Deaf Children's Society. For services to special educational needs.
- Ryan Gander, artist. For services to contemporary art.
- Margaret Gibson, lately Chief Executive, Women's Enterprise Scotland. For services to business and entrepreneurship.
- Fiona Margaret Gilkison, Accelerated Payment Team Lead, H.M. Revenue and Customs. For services to tackling tax non-compliance and tax avoidance.
- Kevin John Gilliland, Network and Sales Director, Post Office Ltd. For services to the post office and communities.
- Jacqueline Giulianotti, Head, Allowance Office, Scottish Parliament. For parliamentary service.
- Colin Glass, Senior Partner, Winburn Glass Norfolk. For services to business start-ups and entrepreneurship.
- Samuel Bernard Goldblatt. For services to business and the community in Northern Ireland.
- John Harry Martin Gosden. For services to horseracing and training.
- James Christopher Gosling, Solicitor and Partner, Holman Fenwick Willan LLP. For services to the legal profession and maritime hostages.
- Janet Frances Gough, lately Director, ChurchCare. For services to heritage.
- David Ralph Gould, lately Executive Principal, ARK Boulton Academy, Birmingham and Regional Director (Secondary), ARK. For services to education.
- Jane Ann Gray, Consultant Nurse. For services to homeless and vulnerable people in the Midlands.
- Christopher Steven Green, Founder, White Ribbon Campaign. For services to equality.
- Robert William Green, chief executive officer, Stonewall Housing. For services to LGBT communities.
- Rosemary Greenlees, Executive Director, The Crafts Council. For services to the craft sector.
- Imran Gulamhuseinwala, Global Lead for FinTech, Ernst and Young. For services to financial services.
- Poonam Gupta, chief executive officer, PG Paper Company Ltd. For services to business and charity.
- Richard Lionel Guy. For services to justice, mental health support and the community in Cambridgeshire.
- Timothy Michael Haigh, trustee, Depaul International Development. For voluntary service to homeless people in the UK and particularly abroad.
- Sheila Ann Hardwick, Senior Scientific Officer, Centre for Applied Science and Technology, Home Office. For services to forensic science.
- Naomie Melanie Harris, actress. For services to drama.
- Grant David Hearn, Joint Chair, Skills and Employment, London Enterprise Panel. For services to unemployed people in London.
- Stephen Hill, chair, Action on Hearing Loss. For services to people with hearing problems and charity.
- Andrew Triggs Hodge MBE For services to rowing.
- Timothy Philip Hollingsworth, chief executive officer, British Paralympic Association. For services to sport.
- Brian Richard Hooper, lately chief executive officer, Ambitions Academy Trust. For services to education.
- Roma Cecila Anne Hooper, Founder and Chair, Prison Radio Association and co-Founder, Radio Feltham. For services to prisoners.
- Elizabeth Claire Houghton, Co-founder and chief executive officer, Mint Velvet. For services to business and charity.
- Professor Susan Elizabeth Hunston, Professor of English Language, University of Birmingham. For services to higher education and applied linguistics, English language teaching.
- Kathryn Jacob, chief executive officer, Pearl and Dean. For services to the promotion of equality and diversity.
- Dr Gaynor Carolyn Jeffery (Gaynor Perry), Assistant Director, EU Consumer Policy, Department for Business, Energy and Industrial Strategy. For services to consumer rights.
- Bernadette Jones, District Manager, DWP Operations, Department for Work and Pensions. For services to unemployed people in South East Wales.
- Professor Peter Malcolm Jones, Independent Transport Commissioner. For voluntary services to national transport policy.
- Rosemary Jones, Headteacher, Elfed High School, Buckley, Flintshire. For services to education.
- Shirley Kennerson, Head of South Essex Local Delivery Unit, Ministry of Justice. For services to probation and criminal justice.
- Alison Cristine Kervin, Sports Editor, Mail on Sunday. For services to sports journalism.
- Naseem Aslam Khan, managing director, Jennings Motor Group. For services to the economy and charity.
- Professor Paul Vincent Knight, Associate Medical Director, NHS Greater Glasgow and Clyde. For services to geriatric healthcare.
- Catherine Large, Deputy chief executive officer, Creative and Cultural Skills. For services to the creative economy.
- John George Lelliott, lately Interim chief financial officer, The Crown Estate. For services to the crown estate and the voluntary sector.
- Sara Jane Lewis, Head of Prosecutions, Metropolitan Police. For services to criminal justice services.
- Nicholas Linfield, Grade 6, Ministry of Defence. For services to defence.
- Nicholas Roald (Christopher) Logsdail, Founder and director, Lisson Gallery. For services to the arts.
- Keith Loraine, Chief Executive, Isos Housing Group. For services to housing and the community in North East England.
- Barry Martyn Lowry, director, IS Shared Services and Strategy, Northern Ireland Executive. For services to government services and the IT industry in Northern Ireland.
- Professor Mary Ann Lumsden, Professor of Obstetrics and Gynaecology, University of Glasgow. For services to women's health.
- Elspeth MacDonald, lately Deputy Director, Criminal Justice, Scottish Government. For services to criminal justice.
- James Lennox MacKenzie, violinist and lately chairman, London Symphony Orchestra. For services to music.
- Dr Keith Alexander MacLean. For services to the energy industry.
- Stephen David Maddock, Chief Executive, City of Birmingham Symphony Orchestra. For services to music, particularly in the West Midlands.
- Dr Brinder Singh Mahon, chief executive officer, Nishkam School Trust. For services to education.
- Ranald Mair, lately chief executive officer, Scottish Care. For services to social work and social care.
- Philomena Margaret Marshall, Education Director and Trustee, Laidlaw Schools Trust and lately Executive Principal, Excelsior Academy, Newcastle upon Tyne. For services to education.
- Clive Reginald Martin, lately Director, Clinks. For services to offenders and their families.
- Carol Margaret McCall, Head of Civil Contingency Communications, Cabinet Office. For services to government civil contingency preparation and ceremonial planning.
- Helen Elizabeth McCrory, actor. For services to drama.
- Catherine Jane McCulloch, co-Director, Children's Parliament. For services to children's rights and wellbeing.
- James Joseph McGonigle, District Manager, Department for Work and Pensions. For services to the Armed Forces Reserves and voluntary service to community sport in Haddington, East Lothian.
- Angela McLernon, Chief Executive, Northern Ireland Practice and Education for Nurses and Midwives. For services to nursing.
- Natasha Mesko, lately Head, Nepal Health Programme, Department for International Development. For services to humanitarian relief.
- Caroline Miller, lately Director, One Dance UK. For services to the arts.
- Susan Jill Miller, Head of Arts, Glasgow Life. For services to culture in Glasgow.
- Tom Miskell, chair, Accent. For services to housing associations in North East England.
- Dr Heather Anne Barrett-Mold. For services to horticulture, sustainable development and environmental conservation.
- Hazel Caroline Moore, chairman and co-founder, FirstCapital. For services to entrepreneurship and innovation.
- Darren James Mott, Director of Campaigning, Conservative Campaign Headquarters. For political service.
- Professor Ghulam Jeelani Mufti, Professor of Haemato-oncology, School of Medicine, King's College London. For services to haematological medicine.
- The Reverend Jennifer Susan Mullis, Assistant Director, Further Education and Legal Unit, Department for Education. For services to further education and to the community in York.
- Ian Hamilton Munro, Group Chief Executive, New Charter Group. For services to housing.
- Professor Rachel Anne Munton, lately managing director, East Midlands Academic Health Science Network. For services to healthcare.
- Professor James Charles Neil, Professor of Virology and Molecular Oncology, University of Glasgow. For services to the advancement of biomedical sciences.
- Professor Anne Neville, Royal Academy of Engineering Chair in Emerging Technologies, University of Leeds. For services to engineering.
- James Henry Newman, lately Chair, Sheffield City Region Local Enterprise Partnership Board. For services to business, the economy and charity in Yorkshire.
- Christopher David Newsome, director, Asset Management and Executive Director, Anglian Water. For services to civil engineering and carbon reduction.
- Sheila Anne Nicoll, Head of Public Policy, Schroders. For services to financial services and voluntary service.
- Julia Alice Nix, District Manager, Work Services Directorate, Department for Work and Pensions. For services to tackling youth unemployment in East Anglia.
- Amanda Jane Nobbs (Mullarkey), Chair, Thames Regional Flood and Coastal Committee. For services to flood and coastal risk management and environment protection.
- Carol Norman, Headteacher, Welbeck Primary School, Nottingham. For services to education.
- Christopher Nott, Founder and Senior Partner, Capital Law LLP. For services to business and economic development in Wales.
- Anthony Christopher O'Neill. For services to the agri-food sector in Northern Ireland.
- Simon John Patrick, lately Principal Clerk of Select Committees, House of Commons. For parliamentary services.
- Margaret Elizabeth Philbin, chief executive officer and Cofounder, TeenTech. For services to promoting careers in STEM and the creative industries.
- Timothy Peter Pigott-Smith, actor. For services to drama.
- Christopher Charles Pomfret. For services to the economy in Cornwall and South West England.
- Thomas Stephen Potokar, founder, Interburns. For services to burns care and prevention abroad.
- Shona Sands Powell, director, Nottingham Lakeside Arts. For services to the arts and education.
- Lindsey Jane Pownall, lately Group chief executive officer, Samworth Brothers Ltd. For services to business growth and productivity.
- Avtar Singh Purewal, Regional Head of Learning and Skills, H.M. Prison Service Yorkshire. For services to prisoners.
- Dr Sharon Patricia Redrobe, chief executive officer, Twycross Zoo, East Midlands Zoological Society. For services to skills, science and the economy in Leicestershire.
- Lieutenant Peter Reed MBE For services to rowing.
- Professor John Van Reenen, economist. For services to economics and public policy making.
- Professor Susan Margaret Rhind, Professor and Chair of Veterinary Education, The Royal (Dick) School of Veterinary Studies. For services to veterinary education.
- Professor Rosalind Jessie Richards, Head of International Study and Language Institute, University of Reading. For services to language support for international education.
- Professor Teresa Margaret Ridge, Professor of Social Policy, University of Bath. For services to the social sciences.
- Danny Rimer, Partner, Index Ventures and board member, Maggie's Cancer Caring Centres. For services to business and charity.
- Michael Leonard Robbins, Principal, Bridgwater and Taunton College. For services to further education.
- Robert Neil Robson, chief executive officer, The Royal Navy and Royal Marines Charity. For services to naval personnel.
- Marva Rollins, Headteacher, Raynham Primary School, Edmonton, London. For services to education.
- Caroline Ross, lawyer, Department of Energy and Climate Change. For legal services to international climate change negotiations.
- Peter William Rowley. For services to sports administration.
- Ailsa Margaret Rutter, director, FRESH Smokefree North East. For services to tobacco control.
- Bernie Ryan, Directorate Manager, St. Mary's Sexual Assault Referral Centre, Manchester. For services to supporting people affected by sexual assault.
- Lynn Caroline Saunders, Governor, H.M. Prison Whatton. For public and voluntary services to prisoners in the UK and abroad.
- Bruce Stewart Shepherd, managing director, Shepherd Offshore. For services to the economy and skills in the offshore sector.
- Ann Shepperd, Chief Executive, Salix Finance Ltd and Trustee, Lucy Faithfull Foundation. For services to energy efficiency and voluntary service to child protection.
- Edward Martin Sherry. For services to young people and policing.
- Marlene Elizabeth Shiels, Chief Executive, Capital Credit Union. For services to financial services and financial inclusion.
- Jasvir Singh, Founding Chair, City Sikhs. For voluntary service to faith communities and social cohesion.
- Kathleen Slack (Smith), director, Enterprise M3 Local Enterprise Partnership. For services to the economy and the community of South East England.
- Robert Keith Sleigh, leader, Solihull Metropolitan Borough Council. For services to local government.
- Air Vice Marshal Michael David Smart DL Vice-Chairman (Air), Council of Reserve Forces and Cadets Associations. For voluntary service to the Armed Forces and the ex-service community.
- Chaya Spitz, Chief Executive, Interlink Foundation. For services to the community and Jewish people in London.
- Alison Katherine Spurway, County Vice-President, City of Glasgow. For services to Girlguiding and charity.
- Dr Arthur David Steiner, Founder and Executive Officer, Hands Around The World. For humanitarian services to disadvantaged children abroad.
- Neil Robin Stock, leader, Tendring District Council. For services to local government.
- John Andrew Straw, lately Chief Executive, City and County of Swansea Council. For services to local government.
- Professor Deborah Ann Sturdy, Nurse Adviser, Care England. For services to older people, dementia care and nursing.
- Charlotte Victoria Sweeney, director, Charlotte Sweeney Associates. For services to women and equality.
- Mohammad Taj, President, TUC. For services to trade unionism.
- Caroline Taylor, Vice-President for Global Marketing and Communications, IBM. For services to marketing, diversity and prevention of human trafficking.
- Professor Keri Vivien Thomas, Founder and National Clinical Lead, National Gold Standards Framework Centre in End of Life Care. For services to end of life care.
- Keith Christopher Thompson, Technical Adviser, Department for International Development. For services to humanitarian relief.
- Jonathan Mark Paul Tibbs, Chairman, Jon Tibbs Associates Ltd. For services to international trade and the sports sector.
- Crispin Marshall Truman, Chief Executive, The Churches Conservation Trust. For services to heritage and charitable foundations.
- Paul Harold Valerio, President, Swansea West Conservatives. For services to Welsh devolution.
- Professor David Glyn Vaughan, Glaciologist, British Antarctic Survey. For services to glaciology.
- Caroline Wake, Head, UK Delegation, Channel Tunnel Safety Authority. For services to transport safety and the community in Kent.
- Aileen Walker, lately Director of Public Engagement, House of Commons. For services to improving public engagement with parliament and voluntary service to the community in London.
- Kathryn Louise (Kate) Richardson-Walsh MBE. For services to hockey.
- Dr Brian Derek Ward, Head, National Resilience Assurance Team. For services to the fire and rescue service and national resilience.
- Hugh Wark. For services to transport and the economy in Scotland.
- Dr Martin Stanley Warren, Chief Executive, Butterfly Conservation. For services to the environment.
- Professor Sally Wheeler, Professor of Law and Head of the School of Law, Queen's University Belfast. For services to higher education in Northern Ireland.
- Alastair Geoffrey Whitehead, lately Deputy Principal Private Secretary to the Home Secretary, Home Office. For public service and voluntary services to policing.
- Graham Arthur Widdecombe, Joint Head of Firearms Licensing, Home Office. For services to public safety and reducing risk to the public through the misuse of legal firearms.
- Dr Christoph Stefan Wiesner, Chief Executive, The Welding Institute. For services to engineering and innovation.
- Danny Wilks, resourcing manager, West Yorkshire Police. For services to policing and voluntary services to justice and the community in West Yorkshire.
- Professor Michael Alan Hewlett Williams, Chief Executive, Gwrp Gwalia Cyf. For services to health, housing and homeless people in Wales.
- Dr Lorna Mcleod Williamson, lately Director, NHS Blood and Transplant. For services to the advancement of blood, tissue and stem cell donations.
- Professor Anne Elizabeth Willis, director, MRC Toxicology Unit, Leicester. For services to biomedical science and promoting the careers of women in science.
- Colum Wilson. For services to humanitarian relief.
- Dr William Benjamin Wilson. For services to the voluntary and charitable sectors in Northern Ireland.
- Christiane Wuillamie, managing director, Elegius Ltd. For services to business.
- Alexander Featherstonehaugh Wylie, The Honourable Lord Kinclaven, Founder, MiniTrials. For services to the introduction of the Scottish legal system in schools.
- Dr Hakim Yadi, chief executive officer, Northern Health Science Alliance. For services to healthcare technology and the economy.
- Andrew George Young, actuary, The Pensions Regulator. For services to pension policy and pensioners.

Diplomatic Service and Overseas List

- Andrew John Booth, Founder and chief executive officer, ABOUTAsia Travel and ABOUTAsia Schools, Cambodia; Author of The Angkor Guidebook. For services to children's education in Cambodia.
- Jonathan Michael Dunn, British Consul General, Rio de Janeiro, Brazil. For services to the British Olympic and Paralympic teams, and to the promotion of the UK.
- Christopher John Ensor, First Secretary, Foreign and Commonwealth Office. For services to national security.
- Maxwell Pearse Gandell, Senior Overseas Security Adviser, Estates and Security Directorate, Foreign and Commonwealth Office. For services to the security of H.M. government staff and missions overseas.
- Ian Gray, Chairman, Egyptian British Business Council. For services to UK/Egypt trade relations.
- Paul Guerin, Country Director, International Foundation for Electoral Systems, Burma. For services to promoting fair and democratic elections in Burma.
- Dr Martin Andrew Longden, lately Deputy Head of Mission, British Embassy Kabul, Afghanistan. For services to British interests in Afghanistan.
- The Honourable Norma Maria Wade-Miller, Supreme Court of Bermuda. For services to judicial services in Bermuda, and as president of the Commonwealth Magistrates and Judges association.
- Dr Elspeth Clare Paterson, Obstetrician and Gynaecologist at Bach Christian Hospital, Pakistan. For services to healthcare for women in North West Pakistan.
- Professor Ram Prasad (Robin) Sengupta, Chairman, Institute of Neuroscience, Kolkata. For services to people with neurological disease in the UK and India, and to the UK/India relationship.
- Dr Adrian Mark Simper, Director Strategy and Technology, Nuclear Decommissioning Authority. For services to the UK nuclear industry in Japan.
- Paul Benedict Smithwick, Lawyer. For services to British/Irish relations.
- Hugo David Walkinshaw, Former President, British Chamber of Commerce, Singapore. For services to British business in Singapore and to UK exports.
- The Honourable Alice Louise Walpole, H.M. Ambassador, Bamako, Mali. For services to British diplomacy.
- Colonel Michael John Winarick, Honorary Treasurer, The Royal Commonwealth Ex-Services League. For services to Commonwealth veterans who have served in the British Armed Forces.

==== Member of the Order of the British Empire (MBE) ====
Military Division

Royal Navy

- Lieutenant Commander (now Commander) Kara Chadwick, Royal Navy
- Petty Officer (Diver) Martin Doherty
- Warrant Officer 1 (Medical Assistant) Peter Leslie Duncan
- Warrant Officer 2 Mark Elfverson, Royal Marines
- Warrant Officer 1 Philip Gilby, Royal Marines
- Warrant Officer 1 Logistician (Supply Chain) Michael Hughes.
- Lieutenant Commander (Acting Commander) Timothy Paul Briggsmould, Royal Navy
- Lieutenant Commander Alun John Read, Royal Navy
- Lieutenant Commander Nicholas Reed, Royal Navy
- Warrant Officer 1 Craig Riach, Royal Marines

Army

- Warrant Officer Class 2 Lorraine Anderson, The Royal Logistic Corps, Army Reserve
- Major Andrew James Bourne, The Mercian Regiment
- Major Thomas Andrew Watson Cairncross, The Rifles
- Major Dale Martin Clarke, Royal Regiment of Artillery, Army Reserve
- Major Vance Robert Thomas Crow, The Royal Irish Regiment
- Captain Anthony Mark Dale, Corps of Royal Electrical and Mechanical Engineers, Army Reserve
- Acting Lieutenant Colonel Mark Robert Sean Dillon TD Adjutant General's Corps (Royal Military Police), Army Reserve
- Staff Sergeant Ian James Flannigan, Royal Corps of Signals
- Staff Sergeant Christopher Michael Fowler, Intelligence Corps
- Major Graham James Goodey, The Royal Anglian Regiment
- Staff Sergeant Andrew Harrison, Corps of Royal Electrical and Mechanical Engineers
- Major Christopher Ashley Head MC The Royal Regiment of Fusiliers
- Colour Serjeant Mark Christopher Charles Holloway, The Rifles
- Warrant Officer Class 1 Barry John Michael Hook, The Royal Logistic Corps
- Sergeant Benjamin Ian Hughes, Corps of Royal Engineers
- Major Mark Stuart Jones, Corps of Royal Engineers
- Major Stephen John Killick, The Parachute Regiment
- Warrant Officer Class 2 Mark Anthony Loader, The Parachute Regiment
- Major Karol Adam Mamos MM The Parachute Regiment
- Major Darren Keith McCleery, The Royal Irish Regiment
- Captain Mark McDougall MC The Parachute Regiment
- Sergeant Alex George Menya, Adjutant General's Corps (Staff and Personnel Support Branch)
- Major Jonathan Patrick George Mills, The Rifles
- Major Martin Patrick Morrissey, The Royal Lancers
- Acting Sergeant Emmanuel Ikemefuna Ottih, The Royal Logistic Corps
- Major Jake Simon Pounds, The Parachute Regiment
- Major Frank Stanley Reeves, The Royal Regiment of Scotland
- Sergeant Jonathan Michael Rigg, Royal Corps of Signals, Army Reserve
- Staff Sergeant John Joseph Patrick Rock, The Royal Logistic Corps, Army Reserve
- Major Robert Hugh Durnford O'Neil Roe, The Rifles
- Major Andrew Christopher Ryan, The Mercian Regiment
- Staff Sergeant Clare Ryan, The Royal Logistic Corps
- Major Steven George Small, The Royal Regiment of Scotland
- Acting Colonel Christopher Hugh Sharwood-Smith, Army Cadet Force
- Acting Captain Verna Jacqueline Burrell-Taylor, Combined Cadet Force
- Major Edward Patrick Thompson, Corps of Royal Engineers
- Warrant Officer Class 2 Mathew John Tucker, Intelligence Corps
- Captain David Trevor Martin Welford, The King's Royal Hussars
- Major Simon David Whitaker, The Duke of Lancaster's Regiment

Royal Air Force

- Warrant Officer Mark John Baker
- Senior Aircraftman Thomas James Berry
- Flight Lieutenant Crispin Nicholas Bond
- Squadron Leader Shaun David Burton
- Warrant Officer Alan David Cleminson
- Squadron Leader Andrew Timothy Crichton, Royal Air Force Volunteer Reserve (Training)
- Senior Aircraftman Shayne Daniel Hadland
- Squadron Leader Michael Richard Ling
- Squadron Leader Duncan Charles Mason
- Warrant Officer Karen Elizabeth Pinnion
- Sergeant Gary David Robinson
- Warrant Officer Francis Magnus Sinclair
- Wing Commander Benjamin Philip Trapnell

Civil Division

- Peter William Adams. For services to the community in Hampton-in-Arden, Solihull.
- Timothy Lawrence Adams. For services to horseracing and rugby league.
- Pastor Brian Cameron Agnew. For voluntary service to the community in Northern Ireland.
- Jonathan Philip Agnew DL, Sports Broadcaster. For services to broadcasting.
- Councillor Mohammed Aikhlaq, Chair of Governors, Leigh Primary School, Birmingham. For services to education.
- John Allen. For services to athletics in Northern Ireland.
- Imran Amed, Founder and chief executive officer and Editor-in-Chief, The Business of Fashion. For services to fashion.
- Melanie Catherine Andrews, Director and Founder, The Scottish Baking Awards. For services to baking and to the community in Helensburgh.
- Giselle Anne Ansley. For services to hockey.
- Anjana Purnawaty Appiah, Foster Carer, Islington Council. For services to children.
- Krushnah Appiah, Foster Carer, Islington Council. For services to children.
- Katie Archibald. For services to cycling.
- George Robert Arckless. For services to the community in Northumberland.
- Colin Edward Armstrong, Head of International Resilience, Government Office for Science. For services to emergency response and voluntary service to community sport in Greenwich.
- John Raymond Armstrong, managing director, Armstrong Medical Limited. For services to economic development in Northern Ireland.
- Hollie Arnold. For services to field athletics.
- Jacqueline Ann Aspinall. For services to young people through the scout movement in Wigan and Greater Manchester.
- Professor Iain Douglas Baikie, chief executive officer, KP Technology. For services to the promotion of science education in Caithness.
- Debra Tracy Ballard, Executive Officer, DWP Operations, Department for Work and Pensions. For services to homeless people in Southend-on-Sea.
- Walter Balmford. For services to training and education.
- Jacqueline Dale Banks, Manager, Asset Performance Environment Agency. For services to communities and flood risk management.
- Sarah Jane Banks, Higher Executive Officer, Ministry of Defence. For services to the MoD disability network.
- Elinor Jane Barker. For services to cycling.
- Sally Ann Barker TD For services to sport and women's participation in sport.
- Anthony John Lane Barnes. For voluntary services to the community in Etchingham, East Sussex.
- Kenneth Andrew John Barrass, lately Chair, Rotherham and North Nottinghamshire College. For services to further education.
- Stephen Bate. For services to cycling.
- Squadron Leader Brian Quintin-Baxendale, lately Inwards Visits and Protocol Officer, DSO Events and Exhibitions Team, Department for International Trade. For services to UK defence industry exports.
- William John Bayley. For services to table tennis.
- Anthony Peter Bayon, Chair of Governors, Harris Academy Merton and Harris Academy Morton, and Member, Harris Federation Board. For services to education.
- Salena Margaret Eileen Begley, Partnership (Scotland) Development Manager, The Family Fund. For services to children's welfare.
- Jonathan Bernard Benjamin. For services to national campaigning on awareness of suicide and mental illness.
- Diane Elizabeth Bennett. For services to young people in Evesham, Worcestershire.
- Oliver Bennett, Senior Library Clerk, House of Commons. For services to supporting the democratic process of the Republic of the Union of Myanmar.
- Paul Bennett. For services to rowing.
- Sandra Biddle, director, Foyle School of Speech and Drama. For services to speech and drama in Northern Ireland.
- Catherine Mary Blair, lately Director of Targeted and Specialist Children and Families Services, Islington Council. For services to children's social work.
- Paul John Blake. For services to athletics.
- Dorothy Blincoe. For services to the community in Clapham, South London.
- Jonathan William Bloomer, lately Trustee and Honorary Treasurer, NSPCC. For voluntary services to children and young people.
- Major Michael Thomas Bolderson, Senior Executive Officer, Ministry of Defence. For services in Support of the Defence Equipment and Support.
- Dr Hilary Roberta Bollan, Senior Scientific Officer, Ministry of Defence. For services to submarine safety and the Royal Navy.
- Tracey Booth, Chair of Governors, Churchill Community College, Wallsend, Tyne and Wear. For services to education.
- Keith Andrew Bott, Partner, Titanic Brewery and chairman, SIBA. For services to the brewing industry and the economy in Staffordshire.
- Debra Lyselte Bourne (Rosen), co-founder, All Walks Beyond the Catwalk. For services to diversity in the fashion industry.
- Professor Deborah Bowman, Professor of Medical Ethics, St George's, University of London. For services to medical ethics.
- Sophie Charlotte Bray. For services to hockey.
- Dr Mary Claire Breay, Head of Ancient Medieval and Early Modern Manuscripts, British Library. For services to medieval history.
- Guy Stephen Brigg, Deputy Headteacher, Dr Radcliffe's Church of England School, Oxfordshire. For services to education and to community in Oxfordshire.
- Alexandra Kathleen Broadrick, lately Chief of Staff to the Conservative Party chairman. For political service.
- Karen Lesley Brock, Founder, Tower Hamlets Arts and Music Education Service. For services to education.
- Sharon Louise Broderick, Police Community Support and Traffic Officer, Merseyside Police. For services to community policing.
- Daniel James Brown. For services to rowing.
- Dorothy May Brown. For services to the community in Pinehurst and Parks, Wiltshire.
- Irene Bruce, Assisted Communications Manager, Population Health Improvement Directorate, Scottish Government. For services to the improvement of access to public services.
- Dr Steven Johnston Bruce. For voluntary service in Fife.
- Maurice George Brunton. For voluntary service through Scouting.
- Nigel George Bumphrey. For services to the church in Norfolk.
- Alex Bunting. For services to the support of victims and survivors in Northern Ireland.
- Candy Phillipa Burgess, Head of Pupil Services, Islington Council. For services to special educational needs.
- Timothy Foster Burgess, chief executive officer, Foundation of Edward Storey. For voluntary services in Cambridgeshire.
- Joanna Butterfield. For services to field athletics.
- Jon-Allan Edward Butterworth. For services to cycling.
- Joseph Cahill, Constable, West Midlands Police and Chair of Governors, Broadway Academy, Birmingham. For services to education and to the community in Birmingham.
- Angela Cameron, Head of Counter Fraud and Whistleblowing Unit, Department for International Development. For services to international development audit.
- Jacqueline Andrea Cameron, Diary Manager to the Secretary of State, Department for International Trade. For public service.
- Jacqueline Ann Pestell-Canavan, Botanical Illustrator. For services to botanical art education in Scotland.
- Karen Julia Carney, Winger, England Women's Football Team and Chelsea Ladies. For services to football.
- Mark Michael Terence Casali, lately chief immigration officer, West London Operational Intelligence Unit, London and South Immigration Enforcement. For services to law and order.
- Christine Elizabeth Dawn Casey. For services to victims of abuse.
- Claire Cashmore. For services to swimming.
- Tanya Catherine Castell, Founder chief executive officer, Changing the Chemistry. For services to diversity in business.
- Keith George Caulkin, lately Physics Teacher, The Blue Coat School, Liverpool. For services to education.
- Richard Cheetham, Senior Fellow in Sport Studies, University of Winchester. For services to education and community sport.
- Jeanette Clare Chippington. For services to canoeing.
- Surjit Singh Chowdhary, Vice-President, Central Gurdwara Singh Sabha, Glasgow. For services to the Sikh community and charity.
- Robin Christopherson, Head of Digital Inclusion, AbilityNet. For services to digital inclusion.
- Mike Smith-Clare. For services to the education of vulnerable and disadvantaged people in Norfolk through the Blue Cat Initiative.
- Mary Elizabeth Clark. For services to charity and the community in Immingham, Lincolnshire.
- Saskia Clark. For services to sailing.
- Christopher Clarke. For services to sport.
- Desmond Walter Robert Clarke. For services to the British public library service and literature.
- Joe Clarke. For services to canoeing.
- Sharon Delores Clarke, Actress. For services to drama.
- Elizabeth Clegg. For services to athletics and charity.
- Susan Margaret Clifford, Volunteer, Adoption UK. For services to children and families.
- Roderick Clifton, Operations Support Manager, Valuation Office Agency. For services to council tax processes.
- Grace Elizabeth Sorrel Clough. For services to rowing.
- Captain Donald Patrick Cockrill, Secretary General, United Kingdom Maritime Pilots' Association. For voluntary services to maritime pilotage and the port industry.
- Helen Cole, Principal, Ballykelly Primary School. For services to education.
- Terry Peter Cole, Building Officer, House of Commons. For parliamentary service.
- Michael Joseph Conway, chief executive officer, FM Conway. For services to UK construction, infrastructure support and road safety.
- Graham Cook, Manager, Albin International Repatriation. For services to the armed forces.
- Jennifer Cooke. For services to supporting people with neuro-disabilities.
- Trevor Cooper, Chairman of Council, Ecclesiological Society. For services to ecclesiastical heritage.
- Joanna Manning-Cooper. For services to sport.
- Kadeena Cox. For services to athletics.
- Penelope Sarah Cox, Headteacher, Holy Trinity Church of England Primary School, Richmond. For services to education.
- Chay Crista Kerio Cullen. For services to hockey.
- Stella Cummings, Northern Ireland Vice-President, British Red Cross. For voluntary service to First Aid and the community in Northern Ireland.
- David Edward Cussons. For services to agriculture and rural communities in North Yorkshire particularly through the Ryedale Agricultural Show.
- Alan Cutler. For voluntary service to geological conservation particularly in the Black Country.
- Basil Dalton, Head of School, North West Regional College. For services to further education in Northern Ireland.
- Alexandra Danson. For services to hockey.
- Roy Matthew Dantzic, lately Deputy Chair, Architectural Heritage Fund. For services to architectural heritage.
- Karen Darke. For services to sport, particularly cycling and triathlon.
- Jane Carr Davidson, director, Outreach and Education, Scottish Opera. For services to opera and education.
- Iestyn Davies, Classical Countertenor. For services to music.
- Peter Roger Davies, Chair of Governors, Kingsdown School, Southend on Sea, Essex and Chair of the Interim Executive Board, Leigh North Street Juniors. For services to education.
- Robert Rhys Davies. For services to table tennis.
- Derek Ypres Dawes. For services to the rehabilitation of offenders and the community in Plymouth, Devon.
- William Thomas Dean, chief executive officer, Tough Mudder. For services to charitable giving through sport.
- Judith Dorothy Deighton, Foster Carer, Hampshire County Council. For services to children.
- Richard James Delderfield, Honorary President, Bloodwise. For services to leukaemia and lymphoma research.
- Jill Belinda Derry (Shedden), Group Human Resources Director, Centrica plc, and Member, Women's Business Council. For services to women and equality.
- Martin Ronald Devenish, Alumni Support, University Council, University of Birmingham. For services to higher education and voluntary service to educational development overseas.
- Sister Rose Devlin. For services to improving community relations in schools in Northern Ireland.
- Parkash Singh Dhami, President, Telford Gurdwara. For services to charity and community cohesion.
- Helen Kay Dicker, Chair of Governors, Tarleton Academy and lately Chair of Governors, Tarleton Community Primary, Lancashire. For services to education.
- Anne Dickins (Usher). For services to canoeing.
- Dr Peter Dickson, Principal in General Practice and Senior Policy Adviser, National Clinical Assessment Service. For services to primary care and the national clinical assessment service.
- Betty Dixon, Chair of Governors, Jacksdale Primary School and Selston High School, Nottinghamshire. For services to education.
- Patricia Alison Dodd, chief methodology officer, UK Statistics Authority. For services to statistics and research.
- Simon Thomas Alexander Dougan DL, Chef and managing director, The Yellow Door Ltd. For services to hospitality and catering in Northern Ireland.
- Owain Doull. For services to cycling.
- Gwendoline Anne (Wendy) Duchesne, Grade 7, Capabilities and Resources, Home Office. For services to developing child-friendly immigration systems.
- Samuel Frank Hartley Duerden, Deputy Director, International Rescue Committee. For services in Response to Humanitarian Crises.
- Professor James Duffy. For services to entrepreneurship in Scotland.
- Adam Duggleby. For services to cycling.
- Richard George Dunning, Owner, Lochnagar Crater. For services to WW1 remembrance.
- Sheena Russell Dunsmore, general manager, Kidney Kids Scotland. For services to children with renal and urology illnesses.
- Scott David Durant. For services to rowing.
- Jacqueline Dyer, Vice-Chair, NHS Mental Health Taskforce. For services to mental health.
- Le-Roy Augustas Edwards. For services to education, training and employment in Nottingham.
- Shaun Nicholas Edwards, Cutter Commander, Maritime Command, Border Force. For services to law enforcement and humanitarian services in the mediterranean.
- Yvonne Edwards, lately Governor, Northampton School for Boys. For services to education.
- Rhona Louise Elliot, Founder, MS Borders Racing Club. For services to horseracing and charitable services to people with multiple sclerosis in the Scottish borders.
- Edward George Elliott. For voluntary service to the Royal Ulster Constabulary George Cross Foundation and Association and the community in Northern Ireland.
- Glyn Ellis, Ambassador and Fundraiser, RNLI. For services to maritime safety and the community in the Isle of Wight.
- Sian Louise Massey-Ellis, Football Referee. For services to football.
- Sylvia Marian Evason, Joint Founder, Jennyruth Workshop, Ripon, Yorkshire. For services to people with learning difficulties in Yorkshire.
- Lora Marie Fachie. For services to cycling.
- Robert Fahey, lately Real Tennis World Champion. For services to sport.
- Patricia Fellows, School Meal Adviser. For services to education.
- Anthony Fenwick, co-Chair, School's Out UK. For services to equality in the education sector.
- Arjuna Gihan Fernando, Investor and Entrepreneur. For services to the digital economy.
- Donna Joanne Finch, Community Development & Safeguarding Manager, Essex County Fire and Rescue Service. For services to children, young people and vulnerable adults in the community.
- Evelyn Theresa Findlater, chief executive officer, Founder and Project Manager, Good Food Matters. For services to young people.
- Lee Firman. For services to maritime safety through the RNLI.
- Bethany Charlotte Firth. For services to swimming.
- Hannah Fletcher, Grade 7, Press Office, Home Office. For services to government communications.
- James Fletcher. For services to the community in Rotherham, South Yorkshire.
- Fabulous Flournoy. For services to British basketball and the community in the north east.
- Jennifer Ann Foote, company secretary and General Counsel, The Manchester College (UK LTE Group) and Chair, National Clerks Network. For services to further education.
- Anthony David Arnold William Forbes, Chairman, Royal Choral Society. For services to music.
- Wing Commander David Forbes, Regional chairman, North Region, Air Training Corps. For voluntary service to young people and ex-Service charities.
- Dr Paul Ford, Pre-Games Manager, British Olympic Association. For services to sport.
- Deborah Forster, Co-chief executive officer, Apps for Good. For services to digital technology and tech development.
- John Kay Fowlie DL For voluntary service in Banffshire.
- James Fox. For services to rowing.
- Stephen Dale Frampton, Principal, Portsmouth Sixth Form College. For services to education.
- Dorothy Francis, chief executive officer, Co-operative and Social Enterprise Development Agency. For services to enterprise and the community of Leicester and Leicestershire.
- Fiona Macdonald, Lady Fraser DL, Chair, The Ninewells Cancer Campaign. For services to charity.
- Karen Fraser, director, Advertising Association. For services to diversity and equality in the advertising industry.
- Muriel Morris Freestone. For services to the scout association and the community in Fleetwood, Lancashire.
- Alesha De-Freitas, Head, Digital Single Market, Department for Business, Energy and Industrial Strategy. For services to the digital single market and voluntary service to education.
- Joanna Frith. For services to archery.
- Tracey Kim Gafoor. For public service and for voluntary service to the Stephen Lawrence Charitable Trust.
- Sarah Irene Garrett, Founder, Square Peg Media. For services to diversity and inclusion.
- Elizabeth Anne Gaunt, Executive Officer, DWP Operations, Department for Work and Pensions. For services to unemployed armed forces leavers and charity in Derbyshire.
- Jacqueline Gent, Headteacher, Bishop Barrington School. For services to education and the community in County Durham.
- Professor Andrew John Timothy George, Chair, Hammersmith Hospital Research Ethics Committee. For services to research participants and the ethical governance of clinical research.
- Sharan Ghuman, Higher Officer, Outbound Detection Heathrow, Border Force. For services to the safeguarding of vulnerable people.
- Megan Giglia. For services to cycling.
- John James Gillan, Grade 6, Border Force, Home Office. For services to border security.
- George Marr Flemington Gillon, Member, Court of Common Council. For services to the city of London corporation and the Scottish community in London.
- Beverley Glean, Founder and Artistic Director, IRIE Dance Theatre. For services to the promotion of African and Caribbean dance.
- Charles Richard Godwin. For services to charity through the Charles Godwin Charitable Trust.
- Sunita Golvala. For services to South Asian dance in the UK.
- Louise Goodall, Deputy Head of Fundraising, Conservative Campaign Headquarters. For political service.
- Dr Victoria Ann Goodwin, Senior Research Fellow, University of Exeter. For services to physiotherapy.
- Matthew Anthony William Gotrel. For services to rowing.
- Patricia Ann Gould, Chair, High View School, Plymouth. For services to education.
- Michael Grant. For services to conservation and the community in Billington, Bedfordshire.
- Steven Errol Grant, Assistant Director HR, Manchester University. For services to unemployed people in Greater Manchester.
- Susan Jane Green. For services to young people, education and the community in London.
- John William Greenslade. For services to agricultural education and conservation in the west country.
- Vivienne Mary Latimer Grey, Volunteer Crew Member, Little and Broad Haven Lifeboat Station. For services to the RNLI and maritime safety.
- Rachel Isabel Griffiths, Mental Capacity Act Lead, Care Quality Commission. For services to vulnerable people.
- Howard Anthony Guard. For services to charity and the community in Hertfordshire.
- Sophie Megan Hahn. For services to athletics.
- Dr Martin John Haigh. For services to the community and to charity in West Yorkshire.
- Gordon Warwick Haines JP, Member, Court of Aldermen, City of London Corporation. For voluntary and charitable services to the community and Environmental Conservation in London.
- Claire Corrine Hall. For services to cycling.
- Major Kenneth Stuart Whitfield Hames. For services to homeless and disabled people and ex-service personnel.
- Wanda Annette Rowan-Hamilton. For services to older people in Killyleagh and Shrigley, County Down.
- Robert Victor Harrild, Special Sergeant, Metropolitan Police Service. For services to policing.
- The Reverend Dr Harriet Anne Harris, Chaplain, University of Edinburgh. For services to multi-faith education and community cohesion.
- Stephen Hart, Grade 7, Ministry of Defence. For services to defence.
- Sidney Hawkins, Engineering Support and Health and Safety Manager, Air Accidents Investigation Branch. For services to aviation safety.
- Professor Kamila Hawthorne, Clinical Professor of Medical Education, and Associate Dean for Medicine, University of Surrey. For services to general practice.
- Liam Heath. For services to canoeing.
- Pauline Mary Hedges. For services to young people, charity and the community in West Byfleet, Surrey.
- Dr David Michael Hegarty, Chair, Dudley Clinical Commissioning Group and Chair, West Midlands Clinical Senate. For services to primary care.
- Simon Helanor, Grade 7, Ministry of Defence. For services to defence.
- Jeanette Mary Jane Hollywood Henderson, lately Senior Charge Nurse, Forensic Rehab, Elgin Ward, Ailsa Hospital, NHS Ayrshire and Arran. For services to healthcare.
- Dr Robert Welby Henry. For services to medicine and the sport of horse racing in Northern Ireland.
- Major James Newton Hereford DL. For services to the rifles regiment and to the community in Herefordshire.
- Georgina Hermitage. For services to athletics.
- Michael John Evans Herring, Volunteer, Metropolitan Police and Metropolitan Special Constabulary. For services to policing.
- Dr Stephen Francis Hetherington. For services to the arts, particularly music and theatres.
- Bronwen Hewitt. For services to the Dame Hannah Rogers Trust.
- Dr Anthony Hill, lately Director of Public Health, Lincolnshire County Council and NHS Lincolnshire. For services to public health.
- Phelan Hill. For services to rowing.
- Sherann Lloyd Hillman, Project Lead, Seashell Trust and co-Chair, National Network of Parent Carer Forums. For services to children with special educational needs and disabilities.
- Peter Girvan Hilton JP. For services to education and the community in Manchester.
- Madeleine Clare Hinch. For services to hockey.
- Mark Ernest Hix, Restaurateur. For services to hospitality.
- Isabella Bell Hogg, Chair, Strabane and District Women Together. For voluntary services to the community in Strabane.
- Michael Holden, Chairman, Trip-ability, Belfast. For services to people with disabilities.
- Elaine Holness, Kinship Carer and Organiser, Lambeth and Southwark Kinship Care Support Group and director, Karibu Education Centre. For services to children and families.
- Sharon Marie Holness. For voluntary services through the National Police Memorial Day.
- Kathleen Hood, lately Head, Widening Participation, University of Edinburgh. For services to widening participation in higher education.
- Edmund Van Hoof, Head Coach and Men's Technical Director, British Gymnastics. For services to gymnastics.
- Martyn Vaughan Hooper. For voluntary services to people with pernicious anaemia.
- Kerry Clancy-Horner, Area Manager, Children's Services, The Children's Society. For services to children and young people.
- Kenneth Hoskisson, Chair, The Walton Centre NHS Foundation Trust. For services to the NHS and voluntary service to end of life patients.
- Rodney Philip Huggins. For services to the community in Reading, Berkshire.
- Trefor Lloyd Hughes. For services to football in Wales, particularly Anglesey.
- Paul Raymond Hutchins. For services to tennis.
- Robin Gaston James Iffla. For services to equality and community cohesion in Scotland.
- Anne-Marie Osawemwenze Ore-Ofe Imafidon, Co-Founder and chief executive officer, Stemettes. For services to young women and stem sectors.
- Oliver James. For services to rowing.
- Professor Wen Guo Jiang, Professor of Medicine, Cardiff China Medical Research Collaborative, Cardiff University. For services to international cancer research.
- Uzma Johal, Festival Director, Frequency Festival and Co-founder and director, Threshold Studios. For services to the digital economy in the east Midlands.
- Sylvie Suzanne Johnston, Chief Executive, Stonepillow. For services to the community in Chichester and Arun, west Sussex.
- Anne Judith Jolly, Founder and Manager, Sudden Adult Death Trust UK. For services to raising awareness of sudden arrhythmic death syndrome.
- Dennis Jones. For services to citizens' advice bureau and the community in Bridgend.
- Huw Lloyd Jones. For services to the central beacons mountain rescue team.
- Kevin Jones. For voluntary service in North West England.
- Martin Peter Jones, Coxswain, RNLI Rhyl Lifeboat Station. For services to maritime safety.
- Michael James Bernard Jones. For services to swimming.
- Nicholas Keith Arthur Jones, Founder and Chief Executive, Soho House and Co. For services to the hospitality industry.
- Terry Jones, Founder, i-D fashion magazine. For services to fashion and popular culture.
- Hilary Gail, Lady Jopling. For charitable services to Children through Hope and Homes for Children.
- Susan Mary Jotcham. For services to heritage and the charity sector.
- Sarbjit Kaur, Detective Sergeant, Merseyside Police. For services to policing.
- Professor Elizabeth Jane Kay, Associate Dean for Equality and Inclusion and Foundation Dean, Peninsula Dental School. For services to dental education.
- Thomas John Kelly. For services to charity fundraising.
- Jo Ann Leah Boylan-Kemp, Principal Lecturer, Nottingham Trent University. For services to higher education.
- Andrew Mark Kerr. For services to the arts and conservation in Edinburgh.
- Mordechai Kessler, Chairman and chief executive officer, 2M Group. For services to industry and exporting in the north west of England.
- Catherine Caskie Khan, Scottish Wheelchair Dance Association. For services to people with disabilities.
- Javid Khan. For services to the prevention of forced marriage and honour based violence.
- Sandra Lynn Kibel (Landau). For services to au pair cultural exchange programmes.
- Sara Regina Kibel, Governor, Westminster Adult Education Service. For services to adult education.
- Lauren Frances Kilbey, Senior Executive Officer, DWP Operations, Department for Work and Pensions. For services to disadvantaged and vulnerable people in Essex.
- Louise Kilby, Chair, Geeza Break. For voluntary services in Glasgow.
- Dr Colin King. For services to football and BAME inclusion in sport.
- Susan Ann Kitchener. For voluntary service.
- Ian Andrew Knight, Investigation Officer, H.M. Revenue and Customs. For services to taxation and multi-agency working.
- Emma Isobel Glynis Kortright, Volunteer and lately Chair of Governors, St. Andrew's and St. Mark's Junior School, Surrey. For services to education and to the community in Surbiton.
- Matthew Langridge. For services to rowing.
- Philip Neil Large, Chair, Liverpool Heart and Chest Hospital NHS Foundation Trust. For services to healthcare.
- Samantha Laskey (Price), Head of Strategy, Performance and Planning, National Counter Terrorism Policing Headquarters. For services to policing.
- Jack David Laugher. For services to diving.
- Albert Maurice Leathem. For services to the Royal British Legion.
- Dr Howard James Leicester. For services to improving patient services in the NHS.
- Patricia Levitt. For services to the community in Barnsley, South Yorkshire.
- Andrew Lewis. For services to triathlon.
- Lily Lewis, Programme Manager, H.M. Revenue and Customs. For services to digital transformation and customer service.
- Katherine Liddell, Team Organiser, Maintenance Delivery Unit, Network Rail. For services to transport in the east of England.
- Joshua Littlejohn, Co-founder, Social Bite. For services to social enterprise and entrepreneurship in Scotland.
- Dr Helen Jayne Livingstone, Specialist Palliative Care Consultant, Airedale NHS Foundation Trust. For services to end of life healthcare.
- William David Lyndon Lloyd, President, Age Concern. For services to the elderly.
- Kenneth Robert Logan, Grade 7, Health and Safety Executive for Northern Ireland. For services to health and safety and the community in Northern Ireland.
- Claire Lomas. For charitable and voluntary services to Spinal Injury Research.
- Constantine Michael Louloudis. For services to rowing.
- Julie Love, Chair, Death Abroad You're Not Alone. For services to the families of people who have died abroad.
- Elvira Jean Lowe. For voluntary service to people with cancer.
- Nicholas Lowles, Founder, Hope not Hate. For services to community cohesion and combating extremism.
- Raymond William Lumley, Special Chief Inspector, Norfolk Constabulary. For services to policing.
- Christopher John Maccormac. For services to education and business in South Yorkshire.
- Roger Mackintosh, Senior Executive Officer, Traffic and Engineering, Department for Transport. For services to transport.
- Dr Hannah Macleod. For services to hockey.
- Janet Enid Maines. For services to the community in Farnham, Surrey.
- Barrington Patrick Marshall. For services to music promotion.
- Christopher Denys Matthews. For voluntary service to the community particularly young people in Tyneside.
- Margaret Ellen Matthews, lately managing director, Dow Corning. For services to manufacturing in Wales.
- Ian Thomas Mattioli, Chief Executive, Mattioli Woods. For services to business and the community in Leicestershire.
- Allen Matty, managing director, West Midlands Chambers of Commerce LLP. For services to international trade.
- Margaret Ruth Mayne, Chair, Board of Governors, Banbridge High School. For services to education.
- Michael Patrick McAlister, Deputy Director and Head of Curriculum and Business Development, South West College. For services to further education in Northern Ireland.
- Kathleen May McBride. For services to sport and the community in Coleraine, County Londonderry.
- Shona McCallin. For services to hockey.
- William John McCann, managing director, Willowbrook Foods Limited. For services to the food industry and the community in Northern Ireland.
- Elma Leiper McCausland. For services to Scottish country dancing.
- William Graham McCrory, Detective Superintendent, Police Service of Northern Ireland. For services to policing and the community.
- Neil McDonald, lately Executive Officer, Human Resources, Home Office. For services to LGBT staff.
- Brian Leslie McDowell, Officer, Prime Minister's Office. For services to No. 10 Downing Street.
- Douglas Webster McGowan, Honorary Branch President, The Paddle Steamer Preservation Society. For services to the preservation of the PS Waverley and charity.
- Ronald Philip McIvor, Chairman, Farmhouse Biscuits. For services to the food industry and the economic regeneration of East Lancashire.
- Christopher James Mears. For services to diving.
- Philippa Margaret Hoyer Millar, Founder, Footsteps Centre. For services to disabled children through provision of intensive physiotherapy facilities in Oxfordshire.
- Hannah Mills. For services to sailing.
- Max Bertram Mills, School Volunteer, St. John Fisher Catholic High School, Harrogate. For services to education.
- Stephanie Millward. For services to swimming.
- Joan Kirsteen Mitcalfe. For voluntary service in Moray.
- Nicola Lucienne Molnar, lately chairman, Conservative Women's Organisation. For political service.
- Aaron Moores. For services to swimming.
- Alun Emrys Morgan, Assistant Director of Therapies and Health Sciences, Cardiff and Vale University Health Board. For services to physiotherapy.
- Councillor Anne Yvette Morgan JP DL. For services to the community in South Wales.
- Brenda Morgan, Partnership Manager, British Airways. For services to economic development in Northern Ireland.
- Glyn Ian Morgan. For services to Hereford Cathedral and the community in Herefordshire.
- Rachel Morris. For services to rowing.
- Sylvia Ingrid Morris, Founder and Chair, Karen Morris Memorial Trust, Cambridgeshire. For services to leukaemia patients and their families.
- Tessa Mary Morrish, Chair, Gene Therapy for Cystic Fibrosis Appeal, North Hampshire and Cystic Fibrosis Care, Frimley Park Hospital. For services to people with cystic fibrosis.
- Samuel Rodd Morshead, lately general manager, Perth Racecourse. For services to UK horseracing and to charity.
- Alan Robert Motion, Chair, Institute of Chartered Foresters Examination Board. For services to sustainable forestry and arboriculture.
- James Carle Buchan Muirhead, Vice-President, Buchan Battalion. For services to the boys' brigade.
- Marion Murdoch. For services to sport, particularly curling.
- Helen Murray. For services to swimming in Scotland.
- Sarah Marianne Murray, Senior Lecturer, Head of Centre and Programme Lead, Institute of Dentistry, Queen Mary University of London. For services to oral health.
- Dr Cheryl Dawn Mvula. For services to responsible tourism, community development and conservation in Africa.
- Massa Singh Nandra. For services to charity and the community in South London.
- George Christopher Nash. For services to rowing.
- Shezad Arif Nawab, Co-founder and chief operating officer, Sfhere. For services to business and diversity.
- Patricia May Neil, Inspector, Employment Agency Standards Inspectorate. For services to employment rights.
- David Hugh Neill, Emergency Co-ordination Officer, Belfast City Council. For services to local government and the community in Belfast.
- The Reverend Robert Towers Nelson. For services to homeless people and the community in Wirral.
- Paul Jonathan Newbegin, Grade 7, Ministry of Defence. For services to the Sovereign Base Area Cyprus.
- Deirdre Morag Newham JP DL. For services to the community in Northampton, Northamptonshire.
- Freda Mae Newton. For services to economic and community development in the highlands and islands of Scotland.
- Catherine Fiona Jane Newton, Humanitarian Adviser, Department for International Development. For services to emergency and humanitarian relief.
- Avril Esmond Sandra Nicholl. For services to disabled people through the Riding for the Disabled Association, Ballyclare.
- Edmund Francis Paul Nickless, lately Executive Secretary, Geological Society of London. For service to Geology.
- Jonathan Phillip Norfolk, Head Coach, Para-Cycling. For services to cycling.
- Robert Hamilton Northridge. For services to rowing and community relations in Northern Ireland.
- Inayat Omarji. For services to built heritage and the community in Bolton.
- Michael Andrew Martin O'Neill, Manager, Northern Ireland Football Team. For services to football and the community in Northern Ireland.
- Thomas Neville Orr DL, Governor, Strabane Academy. For services to education in Northern Ireland.
- Richard Craig Owen, Prison Officer, H.M. Prison Swansea. For services to prisoners and voluntary service to ex-service personnel.
- William John Owen. For services to cycling particularly in Wales.
- Lily Isabelle Owsley. For services to hockey.
- Leslie Stephen Palmer, Founder, The Modern Notting Hill Carnival. For services to performance and the community in London.
- Gillian Joan Adele Palmer, Founder, Marie Collins Foundation. For services to abused children.
- Alison Jane Swan Parente, Founder, The School of Artisan Food. For services to charity and education sectors.
- Anthony John Parfitt, Volunteer Coastguard Officer, H.M. Coastguard, Mumbles, Swansea. For services to maritime safety.
- Bruce Rodney Wingate Parker. For services to charity and to the community in Hampshire.
- Catherine Monica Parlett, Chair, Lighthouse Trust, Leeds. For services to children with special educational needs and disabilities.
- Dr John Parry. For services to the Linklater Pavilion and the community in Lewes, East Sussex.
- Geoffrey William Parsons. For services to the Wingate special children's trust and the community in Nantwich, Cheshire.
- Kathryn Parsons, co-founder and co-chief executive officer, Decoded. For services to digital education.
- Priyesh Patel, managing director, Cofresh Snack Foods. For services to the economy in Leicestershire and to exports.
- Vanita Patel, Anti-Slavery Ambassador, Worldwide Eradication of Slavery. For charitable services to Human Rights.
- Walter Ivor Pattison. For services to disabled people in North East England.
- Marilyn Payne, Volunteer, Save the Children. For charitable services.
- Sarah Jayne Pearson, Head of Customer Services, Personal Tax Operations, H.M. Revenue and Customs. For services to taxpayers.
- Adam Peaty. For services to swimming.
- Dr Terence Dale Pennington, Honorary Research Fellow, Kew. For voluntary service to plant sciences and conservation particularly in Latin America.
- Edward John Perry, Social Secretary, The Guinea Pig Club. For voluntary service to veterans.
- Dr Janice Wendy Peters, Founder and director, Katalytik Ltd. For services to women in engineering and science.
- Hilary Fredricke Cawthorne Philbin, President, British Fencing. For services to fencing and sports administration.
- Camilla Phillips. For services to the community through the hope centre in Halesowen, West Midlands.
- Gordon Errol Phillips, lately Principal, The Meadows Sports College, Oldbury, West Midlands. For services to young people with special educational needs and disabilities.
- Paula Ann Philpott, Head of Learning Academy, South Eastern Regional College. For services to further education in Northern Ireland.
- John Stephen Pollard, Higher Executive Officer, Ministry of Defence. For services to service personnel and families.
- Susan Ann Polydorou. For services to the community in Bromley and Bexley, Kent.
- Lynne Davina Potts, Assistant Chief Officer, Greater Manchester Police. For services to policing.
- George Powell, Captain, 1st Troon Boys' Brigade. For services to the boys' brigade and the community in Ayrshire.
- Dr Jennifer Anne Preston, Consultant Occupational Therapist, NHS Ayrshire and Arran. For services to the occupational therapy profession and neurological rehabilitation.
- Eric Thomas Protheroe. For services to science education and to the community in Nantwich, Cheshire.
- Samantha Ann Quek. For services to hockey.
- Mervyn Quigg. For services to the Boys' Brigade.
- Mary Elizabeth Quinn, Education Consultant and lately Executive Principal, Stourport High School and Sixth Form College, Stourport-on-Severn. For services to education.
- Thomas Matthew Ransley. For services to rowing.
- Leslie Ratcliffe TD, Head of Community Relations, Jaguar Land Rover. For services to business, education and the community.
- Peter David Reeve, Councillor, Huntingdonshire District Council. For services to local government and the community in Ramsey, Cambridgeshire.
- Gordon Reid. For services to wheelchair tennis.
- Mark Riddell, Social Worker, Care Leaving Services, Trafford Local Authority. For services to children.
- David Rigal. For services to diversity in the civil service and services to the Jewish community in London.
- Neil David St. John Roberts, Grade 7, Home Office. For services to truth and justice through the Hillsborough Independent Panel.
- Eleanor Robinson. For services to swimming.
- Rita Christine Roblin, Foster Carer, Bristol and Chair, North Somerset Foster Panel. For services to children.
- The Honourable Helen Alexandra Briscoe, Lady Roche. For voluntary services
- Susannah Elizabeth Joy Rodgers. For services to swimming.
- Louis Rolfe. For services to cycling.
- Justin Peter Rose. For services to golf.
- David James Ross. For services to renaissance and baroque Scottish music in the north of Scotland.
- Karen Valerie Ross. For services to charity and the reduction of knife crime among young people in Walsall, West Midlands.
- Jean Rough, lately Panel Member, Glasgow Children's Panel. For services to the children's hearings system in Scotland.
- Michael Gerrard Roughan, Chairman, Shropshire, Telford and Wrekin and Leicestershire and Rutland Adoption Panels. For services to children and to the community.
- Clive Mark Rowe, Actor. For services to drama.
- Lauren Rachel Catherine Rowles. For services to rowing.
- Indhu Rubasingham, Artistic Director, Tricycle Theatre. For services to theatre.
- Cynthia Miriam Rumboll, lately chairman, Jersey Commandery, St. John Ambulance. For voluntary service to first aid.
- Hannah Russell. For services to swimming.
- Mohammed Abid Saleh, Detective Constable, CSE Team, Lancashire Constabulary. For services to policing and the community in East Lancashire.
- Professor Fiona Ruth Sampson. For services to literature and the literary community.
- Kenrick Sandy, Dancer, Choreographer and Teacher. For services to dance and the community.
- William Spencer Satch. For services to rowing.
- Mohamed Karim Sbihi. For services to rowing.
- Mary Elizabeth Scales, Higher Executive Officer, DWP Operations, Department for Work and Pensions. For services to social justice.
- John Antony Schoner JP For services to the community in Hythe, Kent.
- Alex Virina Scott, Defender, England Women and Arsenal Ladies. For services to football.
- Giles Lyndon Scott. For services to sailing.
- Helen Sarah Scott. For services to cycling.
- Mukesh Shah. For charitable and community service in the UK and abroad.
- Marcia Shakespeare, Public Volunteer on Gang, Gun and Knife Projects, Birmingham Area, West Midlands Police. For services to law and order.
- Iris Sharman. For services to young people and the community in Burton Latimer, Northamptonshire.
- John Sharpe, National Chair, Royal Observer Corps Association. For voluntary service to the Children's Hearings System in Scotland and the Royal Observer Corps.
- Susan Mary Sharratt, lately Head of Speech and Language Unit and Special Educational Needs Co-ordinator, Bexton School, Knutsford. For services to children with special educational needs.
- Kevin Gordon Shaw, Senior Executive Officer, Ministry of Defence. For services to the Royal Navy.
- Jill Bernadette Marie Sheldrake, Service Director, Together Trust, Cheadle, Cheshire. For services to children.
- Sangeeta Rajesh Shingadia, Field Force Officer, H.M. Revenue and Customs. For services to debt collection and charitable service in the UK and India.
- Robert Spencer Simpson, Founder, Electrosonic. For services to the UK's audio-visual industry.
- Tony Singh, Chef Director. For services to the food and drink industry and charity.
- Professor Sital Singh Sitara. For services to Sikh heritage and culture.
- Stephanie Elizabeth Slater. For services to swimming.
- David Smith. For services to boccia.
- Gillian Maureen Smith. For services to guiding and the community in Great Glemham, Suffolk.
- Joanna May Smith, Deputy Director for Prisons, North East England, Samaritans. For services to offender support.
- Reginald Leonard Smith (Marty Wilde). For services to popular music.
- Robert Smith, Harbour Master, Port of Wells. For services to the community in Wells-Next-the-Sea.
- Susan Mary Farrington Smith, Chief Executive, Brain Tumour Research. For services to brain tumour research and awareness raising.
- Anne Smol, Founder and Chief Executive, Face Front Inclusive Theatre. For services to theatre and inclusion in drama.
- Katherine Elizabeth Smyth, Policy Director, Community Energy England. For services to the community energy sector.
- Elaine Spalding, Higher Executive Officer, Ministry of Defence. For services to defence.
- Frederick Nigel Sparrow. For services to the community in Clapham, Bedfordshire.
- Michael Spence, Teaching Assistant and lately Governor, Manorbrook Primary School, Gloucestershire and Trustee, Great Britain Wheelchair Rugby. For services to education and disability sport.
- Edwin Charles Stanbridge, Assistant Officer, H.M. Revenue and Customs. For services to customer service and the community in County Durham.
- Frank Stansil, Fundraiser, King's College Hospital Charity. For services to health charities.
- Professor Jonathan Paul Stephens, lately Director of Music and Music Education, University of Aberdeen. For services to music education.
- Jean Stephenson, Adviser, Citizens' Advice Bureau, North East Lincolnshire. For services to charity and the community in North East Lincolnshire.
- Michael Stephenson. For services to rugby league and sports broadcasting.
- Geoffrey Edward Gordon Stock. For services to young people and the community in Horfield, Bristol.
- Danny Stone, Secretary, All-Party Parliamentary Group against Anti-Semitism. For services to combating hate crime.
- Alistair Duffus Strachan. For services to farming and the community in Cuminestown, Aberdeenshire.
- Jessica Stretton. For services to archery.
- Alice Tai. For services to swimming.
- Manisha Tailor. For services to football and diversity in sport.
- Charles Ellis Talbot. For services to the community in Kidderminster, Worcestershire.
- Lianne Estrelle Tapson, Chair, Grantham Tennis Club. For services to sport and the community in Lincolnshire particularly Grantham.
- Susan Thain, Senior Executive Officer, Ministry of Defence. For services to army education.
- Sophie Thornhill. For services to cycling.
- Olwen Patricia Tomlinson, Senior Executive Officer, Immigration National Security and Counter Terrorism Team, Home Office. For services to immigration operations and border security.
- Deborah Jane Toon, Regional chairman, Yorkshire and the Humber Conservatives. For political service.
- Susannah Townsend. For services to hockey.
- Dr Antony David Trapp DL. For services to the engineering and energy industries.
- Richard Hamlyn Tucker, Founder and director, AAA Property Services. For services to business, skills and the community in North East England.
- Denise Michelle Tully, Bequeathal Officer, University of Liverpool. For services to medical education and research.
- Georgina Sophie Twigg. For services to hockey.
- Melanie Dawn Ulyatt (Coley), managing director, One to One Support Services and Chair, Nottinghamshire and Derbyshire Federation of Small Businesses. For services to entrepreneurship and business.
- Laura Unsworth. For services to hockey.
- Rita Yvonne Roberts Upchurch. For services to the development of cosmetic camouflage.
- Louise Irene Upton, lately Foster Carer, Kent County Council. For services to children.
- Ronald Upton, lately Foster Carer, Kent County Council. For services to children.
- Barnaby Hubert David Usborne. For services to the Chiltern Society and the community in the Lee, Buckinghamshire.
- Jatinder Verma, co-founder, Tara Arts. For services to diversity in the arts, particularly drama.
- Patricia Clare Vernon, Head of Healthcare Quality Legislation and Delivery, Welsh Government. For services to organ donation and transplantation in Wales.
- Mira Vyas, Senior Executive Officer, Universal Credit Programme, Department for Work and Pensions. For services to welfare and the community in London.
- Austin William Sidney Walker, County Vice-President, Kent, Royal British Legion. For voluntary service to veterans and their families.
- Ian Walker. For services to Olympic and international competitive sailing.
- John Stewart Walker. For services to archery.
- Wilma Walker, Headteacher, Kintore Primary School. For services to education in Aberdeenshire.
- Barbara Anne Walsh, lately Case Officer, Honours and Appointments Secretariat, Cabinet Office. For services to public administration and to the community in Kent.
- Helen Richardson-Walsh. For services to hockey.
- Angela Walters, Programme Director for Fashion, Central Saint Martins, University of the Arts London. For services to higher education, fashion and the creative industries.
- Gillian Walton, lately Deputy Headteacher, St. Martin's Catholic Primary School, Cheshire. For services to education.
- Parthenope Lucy Ward, Senior Assistant Librarian, House of Lords. For parliamentary service.
- Simon Ward, lately chief operating officer, British Fashion Council. For services to fashion.
- William John Warnock. For services to higher education sport.
- Wendy Warren, Head of Emergency Planning, Aneurin Bevan University Health Board. For services to emergency planning and health protection.
- Hollie Webb. For services to hockey.
- Dr Premila Nalini Webster, Director of Public Health Education and Training, Nuffield Department of Population Health, University of Oxford. For services to public health.
- George Vernon Wells, Chair, Selby College Corporation. For services to further education.
- Nicola Marie Wetherall. For services to holocaust education, genocide prevention and human rights education.
- Joanne Elizabeth Wheeler (Monk), Founder and co-Chair, Satellite Finance Network and Communications Partner, Bird & Bird. For services to the space sector.
- Joseph Lawrence White, Entrepreneur and Angel Investor. For services to technology businesses.
- Nicola White. For services to hockey.
- Laurence Whiteley. For services to rowing.
- Max Antony Whitlock. For services to gymnastics.
- Agnes Provan Miller Whyte, Chair, Breathe Easy, Kirkcaldy. For services to people with lung conditions.
- Christine Ann Wicks. For services to Girlguiding in Worcester Park and Greater London West.
- Emma Clare Wiggs. For services to canoeing.
- David Wilkinson, Consultant Vascular Surgeon, Bradford Teaching Hospitals NHS Foundation Trust and Postgraduate Dean, Health Education England, Yorkshire. For services to the NHS.
- Eileona Mary Wilkinson, Independent Monitoring board member, H.M. Prison Lancaster Farms. For services to prisons and H.M. Prison Service.
- Sue Ann Wilkinson, chief executive officer, Association for Physical Education. For services to education.
- Caroline Elizabeth Williams, Chief Executive, Norfolk Chamber of Commerce. For services to the Norfolk business community.
- Sonia Bassey-Williams, Integrated Early Support Senior Manager, Cheshire West and Chester Council. For services to the community in Liverpool.
- Anthony Peter Wilson, director, AECOM. For services to building and engineering.
- Juanita Anne Francis Wilson, Founder, Mossburn Community Farm, Lockerbie. For services to vulnerable children, adults and animals in Dumfries and Galloway.
- Ethne Berenice Woldman, Trustee, The Targu Mures Trust. For services to the Jewish community in Scotland and Romania.
- Suzanne Wolff. For services to women in sport.
- Dr Miranda Rachel Wolpert, Founder, Evidence Based Practice Unit, AFNCCF and UCL, and co-Founder, The Child Outcomes Research Consortium. For services to child and adolescent mental healthcare.
- Dr Stuart Glynn Wood, Head of Music Therapy, Barchester Healthcare. For services to music therapy and care.
- Alan Woodhouse, Volunteer, Samaritans. For services to vulnerable people in Merseyside.
- Robert Woods, lately Executive chairman, Mattioli Woods. For services to business and the community in Leicestershire.
- Ronald Charles Woodward. For services to age UK and the community in Herne Bay, Kent.
- Matthew James Wylie. For services to swimming.
- Philip Richard Young, Team Leader, Environment Agency. For services to communities, the environment and flood risk management.
- Riffat Perveen Young, Head of Corporate Services, Department for International Development Nepal. For services to international emergency response.
- Thomas Paterson Young, co-founder, Angels' Share Glass. For services to glassblowing.

Diplomatic Service and Overseas List

- Edward John Bewick Baker, lately Head of Climate Change and Energy, British Consulate General, Shanghai, China. For services to UK/China relations.
- Oliver Ramsey Ballhatchet, Olympic and Paralympic Attaché, British Consultate General, Rio de Janeiro, Brazil. For services to British Olympic and Paralympic sport.
- Darren Francis Forbes-Batey, lately Deputy Head of Mission, Bamako, Mali. For services to supporting British nationals overseas during crises.
- Simon Biggin, First Secretary, Foreign and Commonwealth Office. For services to overseas security.
- Marianne Louise Black, Chair of the Board of Trustees, The British School, Tokyo. For services to British international education.
- Melanie Jane Blake, Founder Kamili Organisation, Nairobi. For services to mental health in Kenya.
- Catherine Kay Borien, Trustee and Field Worker, Borien Educational Foundation for Southern Africa. For services to schools in rural areas of the Eastern Cape, South Africa.
- Stacy Bradford, Third Secretary, Foreign and Commonwealth Office. For services to British interests in Nigerian security sector reform.
- Raymond Arthur Breden, Former chairman, British Romanian Chamber of Commerce. For services to British industry.
- Richard Bruce Allen Brown, British Honorary Consul, Sicily. For services to assisting British nationals in Sicily, Italy.
- Shehzad Charania, lately First Secretary, The Hague, Netherlands. For services to international law and legal diplomacy.
- Timothy John Colley, lately Deputy Director, Overseas Territories Directorate Foreign and Commonwealth Office. For services to Anguilla.
- Roger Maxwell Cooke, latterly President, British Chamber of Commerce, Spain. For services to British businesses in Spain and British-Spanish trade and investment.
- Mary Shaw Coulson, Founder and Executive Director, Restart Africa. For services to improving the welfare, health and education of disadvantaged children in Gilgil, Kenya.
- Helga Danmayr, British Honorary Pro-Consul, Salzburg. For services to British nationals in Austria.
- Akuja Mading de Garang, Team Leader for Girls' Education, South Sudan. For services to the promotion of girls' education and social development in South Sudan.
- Duncan Dyason, Charity Worker, Street Kids Direct, Guatemala City, Guatemala. For services to improving the lives of street children in Guatemala.
- Penelope Jayne Garnham, Deputy Head, Corporate Services, British Embassy, Kabul, Afghanistan. For services to the welfare of H.M. government staff.
- Lynda Catherine Gould, co-Founder, Butterfly Children's Hospices, China. For services to the provision of palliative care to babies and infants in China.
- Patricia Mary Herbert, Vice Chair, Prospect Burma. For services to Anglo-Burmese relations.
- Thomas Michael Hughes, Founder, Silicon Valley Internship Programme. For services to British graduates in Silicon Valley and San Francisco.
- Dr John Donough Heber Keatinge, lately Director General, Asian Vegetable Research and Development Centre, World Vegetable Centre. For services to tropical agriculture and reduction of poverty and malnutrition in the developing world.
- Michael Douglas Keigwin, Uganda Conservation Foundation. For services to African wildlife and conservation.
- Gareth David Knight, First Secretary, Foreign and Commonwealth Office. For services to British interests in Iraq and Afghanistan.
- David James Lister, Second Secretary, Foreign and Commonwealth Office. For services to UK national security.
- Carolyn Olga (Lena) Milosevic, lately Country Director, British Council Mexico. For services to cultural relations in Mexico and the UK-Mexico Dual Year 2015.
- Brigadier Malcolm Bruce Page, Council Member for Somaliland and Grand President's Appointee, The Royal Commonwealth Ex-Services League. For services to veterans in Somaliland.
- Guy Richard Perryman, Radio Broadcaster. For services to British music in Japan.
- Dr John Anthony Poole, Doctor and Surgeon, Guatemala City, Guatemala. For services to medicine in Guatemala.
- Thomas Mark Pountney, First Secretary, Foreign and Commonwealth Office. For services to national security.
- Alison Shan Price, Founder and chief executive officer, One World Actors' Centre. For services to the dramatic arts in Kuwait and the Gulf region.
- Paul Robert Seaby, former Team Leader and Deputy Team Leader, Rapid Deployment Team, Foreign and Commonwealth Office. For services to British nationals overseas affected by major disasters and emergencies.
- Richard Alec Street, Chairman, Chernobyl Children's Life Line, (Pinxton and East Derbyshire Link). For services to sick children in Belarus.
- Philip Waterman, Second Secretary, Foreign and Commonwealth Office. For services to enhancing diplomacy and national security.
- Simon Keith Whittle, First Secretary, Foreign and Commonwealth Office. For services to national security.
- Paul Andrew Wiggins, Overseas Territories Regional Criminal Intelligence System Network Manager, British Consultate General, Miami, USA. For services to the UK overseas territories.
- Ivy May Yon. For services to the voluntary sector, tourism sector and teaching profession in St. Helena.

=== British Empire Medal (BEM) ===
Civil Division

- Trudi Jeannette Abadi, Manager, National Confidential Unit, North of England, National Crime Agency. For services to law and order.
- Joan Ann Aird, Secretary, Hawarden, Ewloe and Mancot Branch, Royal British Legion. For voluntary service to the community in Flintshire.
- Dr Jason Karl Aldiss. For political service.
- Patrick John Stafford Allen. For services to the community in Langham, Norfolk.
- Dr Siow Yen Andersen, Safeguarding Lead, North Leeds. For services to safeguarding children and prevention of domestic violence in North Leeds.
- Jean Anderson (Margaret Jean Hunt). For services to music.
- John Lee Anderson. For services to the community in Burton Dassett and Northend, Warwickshire.
- Marion Ann Austin. For services to the community in Norton Lindsey, Wolverton and Langley, Warwickshire.
- Zena Jacqueline Avery, Secretary, North Devon and Torridge Division, SSAFA. For voluntary service to ex-service personnel.
- Jillian Margaret Baker (Credland). For voluntary service to the community in Harbury, Warwickshire.
- Elizabeth Jane Bannerman, Founder, Hawick Action Medical Research Committee. For services to community healthcare.
- Sharon Avril Bannister. For services to the Jewish community in Manchester.
- Giles Matthew Simon Barker, Chair, Staff Network Group for Disability, Transport for London. For services to transport in London and the armed forces covenant.
- Paul Andrew Raymond-Barker. For services to forestry and silviculture in Wales.
- Humphrey John Barnes, Chair of Trustees, Frome Memorial Theatre Trust. For services to the community in Frome, Somerset.
- Richard Charles Moss Barnes. For services to the community in Abingdon, Oxfordshire.
- Gweneira Baty. For services to the community particularly elderly and young people in Cowbridge and Llanblethian, Vale of Glamorgan.
- Florence Evangeline Baxter. For services to young people, performing arts and the community in South West Ulster.
- Marcellus Baz. For services to youth boxing and the community in Nottingham.
- Michelle Beckett. For services to disadvantaged people in the UK and abroad.
- Colin Frederick Bell. For services to charitable fundraising.
- Leonard Bell, Drum Sergeant, Langholm Pipe Band. For services to music and the community in Dumfriesshire.
- Janet Linda Bird. For services to the community in Hertford, Hertfordshire.
- Elizabeth Wells Blackburn, Support Worker, The William Henry Smith School, West Yorkshire. For services to children with special educational needs and disabilities.
- Dr Lavinia Boyce. For services to the community in Northern Ireland.
- Peter Bromell. For services to the community in Tedburn St. Mary, Devon.
- Tanya Catherine Ann Brookfield, lately Director and Fundraiser, Toe in the Water. For services to the rehabilitation of injured armed services personnel.
- Valerie Brown. For services to the community in South Fermanagh.
- Sheila Mary Bruce. For services to the community in Kinnerley, Shropshire.
- Richard Buchanan. For voluntary service.
- Gillian Frances Burnett. For services to the community in the Isle of Wight.
- Andrew Robert Butt. For services to public safety.
- Eileen Callander, Janitor, Hightae Primary School, Lockerbie. For services to education and the community in Lockerbie, Dumfries and Galloway.
- Aidan Campbell, Fundraiser, Marie Curie. For services to patients with cancer in Northern Ireland.
- John George Campbell. For services to the church in Lincoln.
- Pauline Alice Frances Carson. For voluntary service to the Royal National Lifeboat Association in Holywood, County Down, Northern Ireland.
- Eric Carter, Parish Councillor, New Frankley in Birmingham Parish Council. For services to the community in Birmingham.
- Susan Elizabeth Carter, Executive Assistant to the Director of Laboratories, Science and Technology Facilities Council. For services to science and technology.
- Peter John Cave, Volunteer, Victim Support. For services to victims and witnesses in Staffordshire.
- John Edward Champion, Chairman, Odiham Society. For services to the 800th anniversary commemoration of Magna Carta.
- Angela Chant, Project Director, Spiritulized. For services for Young People in South Hams, Devon.
- Linda Anne Charles, Head of Ministerial Support Unit, Private Office, Home Office. For public service.
- Barrie Charlesworth. For services to life saving in North Devon.
- Valerie Lexena Christy. For voluntary service to the community in County Down.
- Brenda Clark, Founder, Youth Cancer Trust Charity. For services to children with cancer.
- Michael Anthony Clarke. For political service.
- Peter Kenneth Clarke. For services to the community in Croydon through the crossfire team, London Fire Brigade.
- David Villa-Clarke. For charitable service.
- John Alfred Clowes. For services to the community in Holmes Chapel, Cheshire.
- Albert Clyde, Secretary, Riding for the Disabled, Coleraine. For services to the community in Coleraine.
- George Paterson Cochrane, Founder, Community Dog Management Centre. For services to dog management in West Dunbartonshire and Scotland.
- Hilary Janet Collings. For services to the community in Bexley, London.
- Janice Connolly, Artistic Director, Women and Theatre. For services to community arts in the West Midlands.
- Vivien Alma Cooper, Volunteer, Great Western Society, Didcot Railway Centre. For services to railway heritage.
- The Reverend Rosemary Olive Cope. For services to the community in Enfield, Middlesex.
- Angela Copson. For services to running.
- Brenda Mary Corry. For services to the community in County Tyrone.
- Jane Elizabeth Coston. For services to the community in Milton, Cambridgeshire.
- Jeanette Jamie Courtman, After School Club Chair, Pre-School Chair and Breakfast Club Chair, Holbeton School, Devon. For services to education and the community in Devon.
- Eveline Cousins. For services to young people through the Girls Friendly Society.
- Thelma Beatrice Cowan. For services to the community in Bournemouth, Dorset.
- June Craig. For services to charity in Perthshire.
- Rosemary Letitia Margaret Craig. For voluntary services to young people through the Castlederg Girls' Brigade.
- Dalia Beatty Cramer. For services to the community particularly Jewish women.
- Iris Ruby Crawford, Director, South and East Tyrone Welfare Group. For services to the community in South and East Tyrone.
- Sophia Crawshaw, Founder, One Good Turn. For voluntary service to the community in Kirklees.
- Brendon Cross, Vice-President, SpecialEffect. For services to people with physical disabilities.
- Diane Croston, Chair of Governors, Morgans Primary School and Nursery, Hertfordshire. For services to education.
- Beverley Darlison, Chair, Parent Teachers Association and Organiser, School Summer Playscheme, Fitzwaryn School, Oxfordshire. For services to children with special educational needs.
- James Ivan Davison. For services to the community in Portadown, County Armagh.
- Peter William Dazeley. For services to photography and charity.
- Jean Doak. For voluntary service to the community in Coleraine.
- Maureen Joyce Duke. For services to the craft of bookbinding.
- Rosemary (Sarah Jane) Dunbar. For services to charitable fundraising in Northern Ireland.
- Beryl Dunbavin. For services to the community in Garston, Liverpool.
- Mary Gillian Duncan, Volunteer, Chailey Heritage Foundation, East Sussex. For services to children with special educational needs and disabilities.
- Heather Jean Edwards. For services to people with dementia in Norwich, Norfolk.
- Samuel Robert Wesley Elliott, Funeral Director, S.R Elliott and Sons Funeral Directors. For services to the community in County Fermanagh.
- Louise Stephanie Ellis, Member, Research Ethics Committee, Health Research Authority. For services to the research ethics service.
- Dr Clare Eluka, Founder, Premae Skincare. For services to dermatology.
- Hamish Murray Andrew Elvidge, Founder, The Matthew Elvidge Trust. For services to suicide prevention and bereavement support.
- David William Emley, lately Technician, Keele University. For services to higher education and natural history in Staffordshire.
- Jeremiah Oluwatosin Ayotunde Emmanuel, Cadet Colour Sergeant, Army Cadet Force, London. For services to young people and the community in London.
- Audrey Evans, Social Secretary, Aberystwyth and District Stroke Club. For services to the community in Ceredigion.
- Mohammed Farooq. For services to fundraising and providing meals to disadvantaged children in Peterborough.
- Ronald Farrington. For services to the community in Longton and Preston, Lancashire.
- Lionel James Cecil Faulkner. For services to playing fields and the voluntary sector.
- Marcia Feldman. For services to the Jewish community in North West London.
- William Charles Ferguson, Community Service Organiser, Probation Board for Northern Ireland. For services to community safety.
- Michael Charles Fillenham, Founder and chairman, Western Area Clerks Association. For services to education.
- William David Mckee Flinn, Chairman, Belfast Civic Trust. For services to the community in Belfast.
- Samantha Flint, Police Officer, Nottinghamshire Police. For services to policing and child safeguarding.
- Gwyneth Margaret Fookes. For services to local history and the environment in North East Surrey.
- Barrie John Reid Forrest. For services to the community in Reston and Auchencrow, Scottish borders.
- Tracy Foster, Play Specialist, Paediatric Burns Service, Mid Yorkshire Hospitals. For services to children with severe burns in Yorkshire.
- Audrey Kerr Fraser, Volunteer, Beanfeast Children's Charity, Greenock Sheriff and JP Court. For services to children and the community in Inverclyde.
- Leslie Freke. For services to life saving and the community in Tintagel, Cornwall.
- Ivan William French. For charitable service to Healthcare in Middlesex.
- Sheila French. For charitable service to Healthcare in Middlesex.
- Agnes Fullerton. For voluntary service in Glasgow.
- Clive William Furness. For services to young people in Newham.
- James Gamble. For services to charitable fundraising in County Fermanagh.
- Brian Wolfram John Gascoyne. For services to community cohesion in Peterborough, Cambridgeshire.
- Isobel Anne Stuart Gatward. For services to the arts in Hampshire through the Mayflower Theatre Trust.
- Wendy Claire Gauntlett. For services to the community in Penzance, Cornwall.
- Diana Elizabeth Gee. For services to the community in Hunsdon, Hertfordshire.
- William John Gerlach, Member, UK Volunteer Reading Scheme, Shawley Community Primary School, Surrey and The Beacon School, Surrey. For services to education.
- Maureen Mary Gilbert. For services to the community in Brixham, Devon.
- Mark Gill, Executive Director, Magna Carta 800th Anniversary Commemoration Committee. For services to the 800th anniversary commemoration of Magna Carta.
- Janet Isabelle Gillespie. For charitable service.
- Bernard Gingold. For services to the Jewish community in Birmingham, West Midlands.
- Habidah Glass, School Volunteer, Clayton Village Primary School, Bradford and Gladstone Primary School, Scarborough. For services to education.
- Ann Provan Glenesk, Volunteer, H.M. Prison Low Moss, Glasgow. For services to prisoners and community relations.
- Desmond Gordon. For services to the community in Mid-Ulster.
- The Reverend Janet Gould. For services to the community in Ely, Cardiff.
- Violet Avril Constance Graham. For services to charitable fundraising in County Fermanagh.
- Gerald Granston. For services to holocaust education.
- Burkhard Gravis. For services to youth sport participation in Haringey.
- George Gray. For services to the Scottish national blood transfusion service and the community in Stonehouse, Lanarkshire.
- Karen Anne Greaves, Head of Leisure and Lifelong Learning, Education, Leisure and Housing, Orkney Islands Council. For service to the community in the Orkney Islands.
- Isabel Jane Kilmaine Percy Green. For services to the community in Dalham, Suffolk.
- Pauline Christian Grills. For voluntary service to the community and sport in County Down, Northern Ireland.
- Joan Guiller, Manager, Drop Inn Ministries. For services to humanitarian aid and the community in Carrickfergus, County Antrim.
- Stephanie Jayne Hale. For services to authors and literature.
- Yvonne Dedei Aryeetey Marmon-Halm, Administrative Officer, Capabilities and Resources, Home Office. For services to hearing impaired staff in the home office.
- Anthony Michael Halmos, lately Director of Public Relations, City of London Corporation. For services to the 800th anniversary commemoration of Magna Carta.
- Ann Isabella Katherine Hamilton, Office Manager, The Scottish Veterans' Garden City Association. For services to veterans.
- Anna Christina Maud Hamilton. For voluntary service to organ music and the community in County Tyrone.
- Frank Duncan Hamlett. For charitable service.
- Kathleen Elizabeth Hankey. For services to the community in Antrobus, Cheshire.
- Kathleen Hanlon. For services to the community in Ballynafeigh, County Antrim.
- Brian John Harries. For charitable services in Haverfordwest, Pembrokeshire.
- Muriel Olive Harris. For voluntary service to the community in Northumberland.
- Mary Catherine Hart. For services to young people in Coventry and Warwickshire.
- Miriam Anne Harvey. For services to heritage and tourism in Worcester.
- Fiona Haston, Macmillan Clinical Nurse Specialist, Head and Neck Cancer, NHS Lothian. For services to healthcare and charity.
- Joan Dorothy Hattersley. For services to the community in East and West Horsley, Surrey.
- Elizabeth Ann Hay. For services to the community in Rockcliffe, Cumbria.
- James Douglas Haynes, Clerk, Beeston Parish Council. For services to the community in Beeston, Cheshire.
- Professor Peter Andrew Heasman, Volunteer Member, NHS Research Ethics Committees. For services to providing ethical review and support to researchers.
- Margaret Heath. For services to the community in Newcastle under Lyme, Staffordshire.
- Geoffrey John Heathcock JP. For services to the Royal National Lifeboat Institution and the community in Cambridgeshire.
- Sydney Dorcas Henderson. For services to police welfare.
- Tonia Margaret Hickman. For services to diversity and inclusion in the civil service.
- Jennifer Carswell Hildyard. For services to the community in York, North Yorkshire.
- Victor Hird, Farm and Estates Manager, Brackenhurst Campus, Nottingham Trent University. For services to land-based education.
- Avril Froma Hitman. For services to people with learning disabilities in bromley through dance and arts.
- Jean Holland. For services to the community in Mosborough, South Yorkshire.
- Jean Mary Holland. For services to swimming in Dorset.
- Richard Bryan Hool. For charitable service to cancer charities in Northern Ireland.
- Sylvia Mulenga Hornsby, Personal Assistant, Department of Energy and Climate Change. For services to public administration and charity.
- Jean Evelyn Huggan, Volunteer, Milton Keynes Bereavement Service, Buckinghamshire. For services to bereaved families.
- Brian William Hughes, Fundraiser and Standard Bearer, Henley-on-Thames Branch, Royal British Legion. For voluntary service to armed services personnel and their families.
- Karen Ann Hughes. For voluntary services to young people in Swansea.
- Angela Elizabeth Humphreys. For services to the community in Oakham, Rutland.
- Elaine Husband. For services to charitable fundraising and the community in Brockenhurst, Hampshire.
- John Arthur George Hutchins. For services to the community in New Milton, Hampshire.
- Janet Inman, Chief Executive, Lincolnshire Sport. For services to volleyball and the sporting community in Lincolnshire.
- Emrul Islam, Chairman, Newark Youth London Limited. For services to sport and the community in East London.
- David Alistair Jack. For services to photography in Northern Ireland.
- The Reverend Freda Jackson. For services to the community in Middleton, Greater Manchester.
- John Christopher Jacobson. For services to handball in Liverpool.
- Marjory Mackenzie Jagger, Manager, Skye and Lochalsh Young Carers Service. For services to young people and the community in the Inner Hebrides.
- Simon James Jakeman, Firefighter, London Fire Brigade. For services to sustainability and energy efficiency in the London Fire Brigade.
- Canon Dermot Christopher Ledgard Jameson. For services to the community in Rostrevor, County Down.
- Sylvia Doreen Phyllis Jarrett. For services to charity and the community in Goring-by-Sea, West Sussex.
- Janet Jeffries. For services to the community particularly LGBT people in Wales.
- Joyce Monica Jenkins. For services to the community in Swansea.
- Michael John Jess, Secretary, Nautilus Welfare Fund. For services to seafarers' welfare, Wirral.
- Christine Margaret Johnston, Captain, Third Kilsyth Boys' Brigade Company. For services to young people and the community in Kilsyth, North lanarkshire.
- Selwyn Johnston. For services to the community in Enniskillen, County Fermanagh.
- Barbara Patricia Jones. For services to the British red cross and the community in Gwynedd.
- John Joseph, Police Community Support Officer, Mitcham Police Station. For services to young people and schools engagement.
- Pirthipal Singh Kang. For services to fire and rescue awareness and community cohesion in North Kent.
- Davinder Kaur, Chief Executive Officer, SWEDA and Chair, Sandwell Consortium. For services to women's enterprise and the community in Sandwell, west Midlands.
- Adam Kelly, lately Owner, Adam's Ices. For services to business and the community in Galashiels, Scottish Borders.
- Yvonne Avril Kennard. For services to healthcare and the community in West Sussex.
- Betty Kenyon. For services to the community in Bury, Greater Manchester.
- Anthony Neville Kingsnorth, President, The Federation of Enfield Residents' and Allied Associations. For services to the community in Enfield, Middlesex.
- Margaret Mary Kite. For services to charitable fundraising and the community in Kenilworth, Warwickshire.
- Mary Knox. For voluntary services to the community of Broughshane, Northern Ireland.
- Matilda Maud Kyle. For voluntary services to the Northern Ireland Hospice.
- Susan Mary Lambert. For services to the community in Thorpe Langton, Leicestershire.
- Sheena Sandra Lamond, Manager, Media Kitchen, James Hutton Institute. For services to agricultural science.
- Stella Laughlin, Coordinator, Giving Tree Appeal. For charitable service to the community in Belfast.
- Alyson Lawton, lately Trust and Company Secretary, Historic Royal Palaces. For services to heritage.
- Jacqueline Johnston-Lynch, Co-founder and Head of Service, Tom Harrison House. For services to veteran support.
- Margaret Barbara Macbean, Captain, 4b Cauldeen Girls' Brigade. For services to young people in Inverness.
- Lesley Macneil. For voluntary services to the Royal Voluntary Service and to the University Hospital of Wales, Cardiff.
- Gurcharan Mall. For services to British Asian music and performing arts.
- Ann Judith Malling. For services to young people in the south west of England through Girlguiding.
- Christopher March. For services to the community in Warminster, Wiltshire.
- Margaret Marshall. For services to integrated education in Northern Ireland.
- Esther Bridget Mathews. For services to canoeing.
- Edith McAdams. For services to the community in Northern Ireland.
- Fiona Margaret McAllan, Admissions Officer, Scottish Borders College. For services to education.
- Sheila Frances McCallum. For voluntary service to music in Mid Argyll.
- Mary Rosalind McCleary. For services to the arts and the community in Hillsborough, County Down.
- Margaret McCullagh, President, The Royal British Legion, Portrush Branch. For services to the community in Portrush.
- Ann Elizabeth McGarrigle. For services to mental health and the bereaved in Northern Ireland.
- Robert Arthur McGonigle, Parish Administrator, Saint Columb's Cathedral. For services to built heritage and tourism in Londonderry.
- Michael Francis McGreevy, Coach, Dromore Athletics Club. For services to sport and the community in Doremore, County Down.
- Brian Keith McGuiness. For services to rugby union and charity.
- Mabel Louise McGurk. For services to terminally ill patients and the community in Middlesbrough, Teesside.
- Gail Adele McKeitch, Branch Chair, Ellon Branch, National Autistic Society. For services to people with autism and their families in North East Scotland.
- Tom McKenna, Chairman, Crewe United Football and Social Club. For services to football and cross-community reconciliation in Northern Ireland.
- Lisa McLoughlin. For voluntary services to the Brain Tumour Charity.
- Myrtle Elizabeth Meeke. For services to the community in Dromore, County Down.
- Jane Rodwell Middleton. For services to the community in Chilmark, Wiltshire.
- Melissa Fay Middleton. For services to charity in Kenya and the community in Teignmouth, Devon.
- John Scott Mitchell. For voluntary service to the community in Northern Ireland through Volunteer Now.
- Barbara Mitcheson, Secretary, Bodenham Flood Protection Group. For services to the community in Herefordshire.
- Christine Mary Morgan. For services to the community in Spilsby, Lincolnshire.
- William Isaac Morrow. For voluntary services to the community in Belfast.
- Akeim Mundell. For services to the community in Manchester.
- Teena Munden, Business Centre Manager, Ordnance Survey. For services to corporate fundraising and to charity in Southampton.
- Jean Munro. For voluntary services in Inverness-shire.
- Terence Alexander Munro. For voluntary services to sculling and rowing in Belfast.
- Siraaj-Ul-Haq Nadat, Senior Quality of Life Facilitator, Changing Our Lives. For services to people with disabilities in the West Midlands.
- Sewa Singh Nandhra. For services to the community, particularly in Woolwich, London.
- Saba Nasim. For services to cricket and young people in London.
- Patricia Newton, Convener, Age Concern Eastwood. For services to older people in East Renfrewshire.
- Elsie Normington, Development Officer, Merkinch Community Centre. For services to the community in Inverness-shire.
- Alistair Derek Norval, Organist, St. Paul's Church, Milngavie. For services to music in Dunbartonshire.
- Maureen Olive Nunn, Midday Assistant, Cleaner and School Volunteer, Lubbins Park Primary School, Essex. For services to education.
- Derek Walter Old. For services to the community in Ibberton, Dorset.
- Ethel Oldcroft. For voluntary service to older people in County Fermanagh.
- Sheila Margaret Onions. For services to the community in Fillongley, Warwickshire.
- Ann Orr. For services to agriculture industry and the rural community in County Fermanagh, Northern Ireland.
- William Edward Raymond Orr. For voluntary and charitable service in Northern Ireland.
- Amanda Marie Catharine Park, Fundraiser, SSAFA and the Royal British Legion. For voluntary service to the ex-Service community.
- Sally Parker. For services to the community in Shipton Gorge, Dorset.
- Carmen Patel, lately Head of Year 11, Oasis Academy Coulsdon, Croydon. For services to education.
- Parita Paritaten Patel. For voluntary and charitable services to poverty reduction in India.
- Jean Elizabeth Beatrice Patterson. For services to the community in Seskinore, Northern Ireland.
- Pauline (Kerry) Peacock, Horticultural Manager, Woolton in Bloom. For voluntary services to the Gardens of Woolton Village, Liverpool.
- Enid Pennington. For voluntary service to the arts in the North West.
- Sheila Ann Perry. For services to Second World War heritage.
- Neville Pettitt, Chairman, West Suffolk Wheelers. For services to cycling and youth participation in cycling.
- Dorothy Pickering, Head Dinner Lady, Mercenfield Primary School. For services to the community in Markfield, Leicestershire.
- Indu Popat, Hindu Priest, Ashton Under Lyme Hindu Temple. For services to Asian women in the north west.
- Alan Pope. For services to music and young people in Camborne, Cornwall.
- Ingrid Judith Posen. For services to the community in North West London.
- Pamela Mary Preston, Volunteer, Samaritans. For services to mental health in the West Midlands.
- Richard Edgar Price. For services to the samaritans and the community in Chester.
- Peter John Pritchard, Coastal Operations Area Commander, H.M. Coastguard. For services to maritime safety.
- Kenneth Clifford Prouse. For services to the community in Penzance, Cornwall.
- Norman Frederick Pullen. For services to Exeter Cathedral and to the community in Exeter.
- James Quick, Honorary Secretary, Weybridge Rifle and Pistol Club. For services to the sport of shooting.
- Leslie Alexander Quilty, Volunteer, Maritime Volunteer Service. For services to the maritime community and seafaring skills.
- Mary Elizabeth Ann Ramsay. For services to the community in Portsmouth.
- Baljinder Singh Rana, Chairman, Guru Nanak Football Club. For services to football and inclusion in Kent.
- Vijey Rattan, Chair, Naree Shakti. For services to interfaith relations in Enfield.
- Christopher Michael Reynolds, Volunteer Regional Representative, British Trust for Ornithology. For services to ornithology in the western isles.
- Pamela Reynolds, Volunteer, Reading Division, SSAFA. For services in support of Gurkha Family Integration.
- Vanessa Sarah Riley. For services to figure skating.
- Norman Rimmington. For services to football and the community of Barnsley.
- Rhona Catherine Ritchie, Crossing Patrol Warden, Pumpherston and Uphall Station Primary School, West Lothian. For services to education.
- Juliet Mary Robb, Founder, The Olive Tree. For services to interfaith relations and charitable services abroad.
- Pauline Roberts. For services to the community in Cemaes, Anglesey.
- Brian Robinson. For services to cycling and to charity.
- Elizabeth Wilson Robinson, Bereavement Manager, Mid Cheshire Hospitals NHS Foundation Trust. For services to healthcare.
- Lillias Nairn Robinson, Director and Trustee, St. Andrew's Clinics for Children. For charitable services in Africa.
- Marie Ross. For voluntary services to people with cancer and the community in Clackmannanshire.
- Mary Helen Ross. For services to country dancing and charity in Nairn and Inverness.
- Joyce Hannah Vivienne Rothschild. For services to charity and the community in Solihull, West Midlands.
- Gordon Lambert Routledge. For services to the community in Longtown, Cumbria.
- Ann Rosemary Rudeforth. For services to the community in Wheathampstead, Hertfordshire.
- Nadia Fauzi Saba. For services to triathlon in Bristol.
- Stephen John Saville. For services to broadcasting and the community in Verwood, Dorset.
- Ellen Scott, lately Senior Administrator, Department of Veterinary Scientific Services, University of Edinburgh. For services to research and the community in Gorebridge, Midlothian.
- Rodney William Scott, lately chairman, The Desert Rats Association. For voluntary service to veterans.
- Ms, Janet Helen Scrine, Founder Member, Milestone Society. For services to local roadside heritage.
- Margaret Helen Shaw, leader, 19th Huddersfield (Golcar Church) Rainbows and Brownies. For services to children.
- Stanley Shaw, Master Cutler. For services to manufacturing in Sheffield.
- Maureen Elizabeth Sherman. For services to young people and sport.
- Maurice Samuel Simpson, lately Voluntary Car Services Driver, Northern Ireland Ambulance Service. For services to the community in Londonderry.
- Fiona Anne Sinfield, lately Music Teacher, Linton Mead Primary School, Thamesmead, London. For services to education and the community in Thamesmead.
- Jean Singleton. For services to charitable fundraising and the community in Leek Wootton, Warwickshire.
- Penelope Jane Frederica Slade. For services to charity and the community in Bournemouth, Dorset.
- Patricia Slavin, HR Adviser, Department for International Development. For services to human resources.
- Brendan Malcolm Sleight, Chair, Staff Network for Injured and Sick Ex-Forces and Reservist Personnel, Transport for London. For services to transport and the community in London
- Elizabeth Karen Smith, Stonehaven, RNLI Fundraising Branch. For services to charitable fundraising and the community in Scotland.
- Gary Smith, co-founder, Working Against Grooming. For services to combating child sexual abuse.
- Mark Kenneth Smith, Founder, Ryan Smith Foundation. For services to supporting people with brain injuries and their families.
- Janet Souness, lately managing director, LiveWire. For services to sport and leisure in Warrington, Cheshire.
- Edward George Sparkes. For voluntary services to the Visitors and Collections of Hughenden Manor, Buckinghamshire.
- Denise Lillian Speakman, Treasurer, Ethos Home Office Sports and Social Association, Home Office. For public service.
- Malcolm John Stent. For services to entertainment and charity in Solihull.
- Cynthia Nkiruka Stroud, Founder and director, Cakes by Cynthia and Pretty Gorgeous Cakes. For services to business and the community in Hertfordshire.
- William Donald Stupples, Armourer, Ministry of Defence. For services to army training and charitable service.
- Rosalind Taylor, Volunteer Assessor, Eco-Schools Green Flag Award. For services to education.
- Eva Elizabeth Ann Thomas. For services to the community in Little Hereford, Herefordshire.
- June Karen Thomas. For services to the provision of defibrillators in Welsh schools.
- Theresa Maria Thomas, Staff Nurse, Medical Assessment Unit, Aneurin Bevan University Health Board. For services to nursing care in Gwent.
- Geoffrey Thorpe. For voluntary service to the community in Harbury, Warwickshire.
- Vera Elizabeth Thrussell. For services to the community in Pirton, Hertfordshire.
- Florence Elizabeth Ann Tinsley. For services to music and the community in Glenarm, County Antrim.
- Mary Agnes Tiso. For services to the community in Harlaston, Staffordshire.
- Gabriel Gerard Trueman, Chair, Youth Advisory Committee for the East Down Rural Youth Work Project, Downpatrick. For voluntary service to disadvantaged children and young people.
- Owen Keith Tulsie. For services to charitable fundraising.
- Henry Francis (Harry) Twamley. For services to amateur football.
- Brian John Varney, Police Constable, Leicestershire Police. For services to policing.
- Mark Walder, Special Sergeant, British Transport Police. For voluntary service to the community in East Sussex.
- Ian David Ward, Founder, Isle of Wight Community Bus Partnership. For services to community transport.
- James Gregory Warner. For services to heritage and people with learning disabilities in Greenwich, London.
- Lucia Hildegard Watson. For charitable service.
- Denise De Wet. For services to dance and the voluntary sector in Staffordshire.
- Hazel Margery Whitehead. For services to the community in Ingleton, County Durham.
- Katrina Whittaker. For services to people affected by mental health difficulties.
- Carol Ann Wilding, Operations Manager, Home Office. For public and voluntary services to People with Disabilities in South Yorkshire.
- Martyn Lloyd Williams, Chair, Saundersfoot Festivities Association. For services to charities in Pembrokeshire.
- William Robert Andrew Wilson. For services to the community in County Fermanagh and County Tyrone.
- Pauline Mary Wiltshire, Volunteer, Silver Eagle, Barclay's Digital Eagles. For voluntary service to digital inclusion in Berkshire.
- Paul Winchester. For voluntary services to the community in Harbury, Warwickshire.
- Corinne Anna Winwood, Youth and Mini Section chairman, Braintree Rugby Club. For services to youth rugby in Essex.
- Mollie Elizabeth Wise. For services to charitable fundraising and the community in Bourton-on-the-Water, Gloucestershire.
- Devan Alexander William Witter, Founder, Devan Group, East Yorkshire. For services to children's mental healthcare and wellbeing.
- Ivor John Charles Wood. For services to the guide dogs for the blind and the community in Coventry, West Midlands.
- Margaret Ann Worsley. For voluntary service to the community on the Isle of Tiree, Inner Hebrides.
- Andrew John Yates. For services to sailing in Solihull.
- Qurratul Annie Zaidi. For services to football coaching.

Diplomatic Service and Overseas List

- Derek Talbot Barnes, President, Royal British Legion, São Paulo, Brazil. For services to the British community in Brazil.
- Sean Boyle, general manager, British Club, Singapore. For services to the promotion of British business and support for charities in Asia.
- Victoria Dunford, director, MAD-Aid. For services to children with special needs in northern Moldova.
- Amy Vera Ann English, Former Congressional Officer, British Embassy, Washington, United States of America. For services to British interests in the United States of America.
- Elizabeth Maria Parry Peace, former Editor, Sur in English, Málaga. For services to British nationals living in Andalucia, Spain.
- Kenneth Scott Andrew Thompson, director, Harum Energy, Jakarta. For services to charity fundraising in Indonesia.
- Laura Ann Thompson. For services to the British community in Indonesia and to charity through the British Community Committee, British Women's Association and Java St. Andrew society.

=== Royal Red Cross ===
==== Associates of the Royal Red Cross (ARRC) ====
- Warrant Officer Lee Bond, Princess Mary's Royal Air Force Nursing Service
- Major Jennifer Anne Ritchie, Queen Alexandra's Royal Army Nursing Corps

=== Queen's Police Medal (QPM) ===
Ribbon bar of the Queen's Police Medal for Merit, as awarded for Distinguished Service

England and Wales

- David John Allard, lately Assistant Chief Constable, Ministry of Defence Police.
- Gordon Briggs, lately Chief Superintendent, Metropolitan Police Service.
- Leslie Roger Eke, Constable, Thames Valley Police.
- Carol Ellwood, Detective Inspector, Humberside Police.
- Martin Lloyd Fry, Chief Superintendent, British Transport Police.
- Ian David Hanson, Inspector, Greater Manchester Police.
- David Graham Jones, Chief Constable, North Yorkshire Police.
- Simon Martin Letchford, lately Commander, Metropolitan Police Service.
- Shirley Vivienne Lindsay, Constable, Avon and Somerset Police.
- Dr Victor Olisa, Chief Superintendent, Metropolitan Police Service.
- Jacqueline Oliver, lately Constable, Metropolitan Police Service.
- Louise Pye, Constable, Sussex Police.
- Jagdev Singh Atwal, Chief Superintendent, Derbyshire Constabulary.
- Timothy Slade, Sergeant, City of London Police.
- Christopher Smith, Constable, Dorset Police.
- Angela Williams, Temporary Assistant Chief Constable, West Yorkshire Police.
- Ifor Williams, Constable, Avon and Somerset Police.

Scotland

- Lesley Boal, Detective Chief Superintendent, Police Scotland.
- Kate Thomson, Assistant Chief Constable, Police Scotland.
- George Trayner, Constable, Police Scotland.

Northern Ireland

- Robin Gouk, Inspector, Police Service of Northern Ireland.
- Samuel Hoey, Sergeant, Police Service of Northern Ireland.
- Anne Marks, Detective Chief Inspector, Police Service of Northern Ireland.
- Overseas Michael Anthony Desilva, Commissioner of Police, Bermuda Police Service.

=== Queen's Fire Service Medal (QFSM) ===
Ribbon bar of the Queen's Fire Service Medal for Merit, as awarded for Distinguished Service

England and Wales

- Alex Bennett, lately chief fire officer, Northumberland Fire and Rescue Service.
- Christopher Davies, chief fire officer, Mid and West Wales Fire and Rescue Service.
- Trevor McIlwaine, Group Manager, Leicestershire Fire and Rescue Service.
- Ann Millington, Chief Executive, Kent Fire and Rescue Service.
- Jason Thelwell, chief fire officer and Chief Executive, Buckinghamshire Fire and Rescue Service.

Scotland

- Ian Bell, Watch Manager, Scottish Fire and Rescue Service.

=== Queen's Ambulance Service Medal (QAM) ===
Ribbon bar of the Queen's Ambulance Service Medal for Merit, as awarded for Distinguished Service

England and Wales

- Andrew Challenger, Senior Education and Development Lead, Welsh Ambulance Services NHS Trust.
- Nigel Rees, Head of Research and Innovation, Welsh Ambulance Services NHS Trust.
- Paul Albert Smith, Sector Delivery Manager, London Ambulance Service NHS Trust.
- Robert Glyn Williams, former Chief Executive, North West Ambulance Service NHS Trust.

Scotland

- John Alexander, Head of Service, Scottish Ambulance Service.

=== Queen's Volunteer Reserves Medal (QVRM) ===
Ribbon bar of the Queen's Volunteer Reserves Medal

- Lieutenant Commander Alan Rogers, Royal Navy
- Army Warrant Officer Class 1 Adrian David Keeble, Royal Corps of Signals, Army Reserve
- Warrant Officer Class 1 Christopher Elwood Klass, Royal Corps of Signals, Army Reserve
- Major Ian Christopher McAuliffe, Royal Army Medical Corps, Army Reserve
- Major Andre Lawrence Prudent, The Rifles, Army Reserve
- Warrant Officer Class 2 Ian Quigley, The Parachute Regiment, Army Reserve

=== Overseas Territories Police Medal ===
Ribbon bar of the Overseas Territories Police Medal for Merit, as awarded for Meritorious Service

- John Goodman, Inspector, Royal Gibraltar Police.
- Nicholas Pedro, Chief Inspector, Bermuda Police Service.
- Spiros Soteriou, Superintendent, Eastern Sovereign Base Areas Police, Cyprus.

== Crown Dependencies ==
=== The Most Excellent Order of the British Empire ===
==== Officer of the Order of the British Empire (OBE) ====
Jersey

- Jill Meredith Clapham. For Honorary services to the Royal Court and to the community.

==== Member of the Order of the British Empire (MBE) ====
Isle of Man

- Olga Kathleen Gray. For services to the Manx community.
- Philip James Taubman. For services to motorcycling and the Manx community.

Guernsey

- Robert Anthony Platts. For services to disabled people in Guernsey.

Jersey

- William Millar. For services to the state of Jersey prison service.

=== British Empire Medal (BEM) ===
Isle of Man

- William Charles Dale. For services to the Manx marine environment.

Guernsey

- Lisa Karen Johnston. For services to the arts in Guernsey.

== Antigua and Barbuda ==
Below are the individuals appointed by Elizabeth II in her right as Queen of Antigua and Barbuda, on advice of her ministers in Antigua and Barbuda.

=== The Most Excellent Order of the British Empire ===
==== Officer of the Order of the British Empire (OBE) ====
- Dwight Cuthbert Revirre Gardiner. For services to the national and international marine community.

=== Queen's Police Medal (QPM) ===
- Assistant Police Commissioner Phillip Nehemiah Isaacs, Royal Police Force of Antigua and Barbuda.
- Assistant Police Commissioner Alvin Sylvester Thomas, Royal Police Force of Antigua and Barbuda.

== Canada ==
- 2017 New Year Honours (Canada)

== Grenada ==
Below are the individuals appointed by Elizabeth II in her right as Queen of Grenada, on advice of the Grenadian Government.

=== The Most Excellent Order of the British Empire ===
==== Officer of the Order of the British Empire (OBE) ====
- Michael Archibald. For services to banking.

==== Member of the Order of the British Empire (MBE) ====
- Lawrence Anthony Duncan. For services to the cruise ship industry.
- Maudlyn Ferguson. For services to education.

=== British Empire Medal (BEM) ===
- Jarvis Kelvin Paul Lawrence. For services to horticulture and business.
- Norbert Carlvin Simon. For services to the fishing industry.

== Saint Christopher and Nevis ==
Below are the individuals appointed by Elizabeth II in her right as Queen of Saint Kitts and Nevis, on advice of the Kittian and Nevisian Government.

=== The Most Excellent Order of the British Empire ===
==== Commander of the Order of the British Empire (CBE) ====
- Dennis Michael Arthur Morton. For services to commerce and industry.

==== Officer of the Order of the British Empire (OBE) ====
- Claudette Althea Manchester. For services to broadcasting and to the community.

==== Member of the Order of the British Empire (MBE) ====
- Eloise Vanta Archibald. For public service.
- Elquemedo Tonitto Willett. For services to sport.

== Solomon Islands ==
Below are the individuals appointed by Elizabeth II in her right as Queen of the Solomon Islands, on advice of the Solomon Islands Government.

=== The Most Excellent Order of the British Empire ===
==== Officer of the Order of the British Empire (OBE) ====
- Joyce May Hallu. For services to nursing.
- Neptune Aleigana Lopu. For services to teaching, the church and to the community.

==== Member of the Order of the British Empire (MBE) ====
- Hezel Pitavavini Boseto. For services to the government, the United Church and to the community.
- Peter Toosi. For services to government, the church and to the community.
- Morris Waria. For services to the government's marine division, the church and to the community.

=== Queen's Police Medal (QPM) ===
- Superintendent Paul Kaia Bulu, Royal Solomon Islands Police Force.
