= Jeremiah Emmanuel =

British entrepreneur and youth activist

Jeremiah Emmanuel BEM
- Born: Jeremiah Emmanuel; June 20, 1999 (age 26)
- Known for: Services to Young People
- Awards: British Empire Medal

Jeremiah Emmanuel BEM (born 20 June 1999) is an entrepreneur and youth activist He set up the One Big Community at the age of 13. He has been elected to the UK Youth Parliament and was deputy young mayor of Lambeth. He founded BBC Radio 1Xtra Youth Council & EMNL Consultancy

He was awarded a BEM for services to Young People and the community in London in 2017 New Year Honours.

Emmanuel is the author of Dreaming in a Nightmare published in 2020 by Penguin books.
