= Anthony Forbes =

Anthony David Arnold William Forbes MBE (15 January 1938 – 19 February 2017) was the joint senior partner in the stockbroking firm of Cazenove. He was responsible, with his partners, for finding buyers for many of the public assets privatised by the British government during the 1980s.
