= 2010 Women's Hockey World Cup =

Field hockey tournament in Rosario, Argentina

Tournament details
- Host country: Argentina
- City: Rosario
- Dates: 29 August – 11 September
- Teams: 12
- Venue: Estadio Mundialista de Hockey

Final positions
- Champions: Argentina (2nd title)
- Runner-up: Netherlands
- Third place: England

Tournament statistics
- Matches played: 38
- Goals scored: 153 (4.03 per match)
- Top scorer: (Netherlands) Maartje Paumen (12 goals)
- Best player: (Argentina) Luciana Aymar

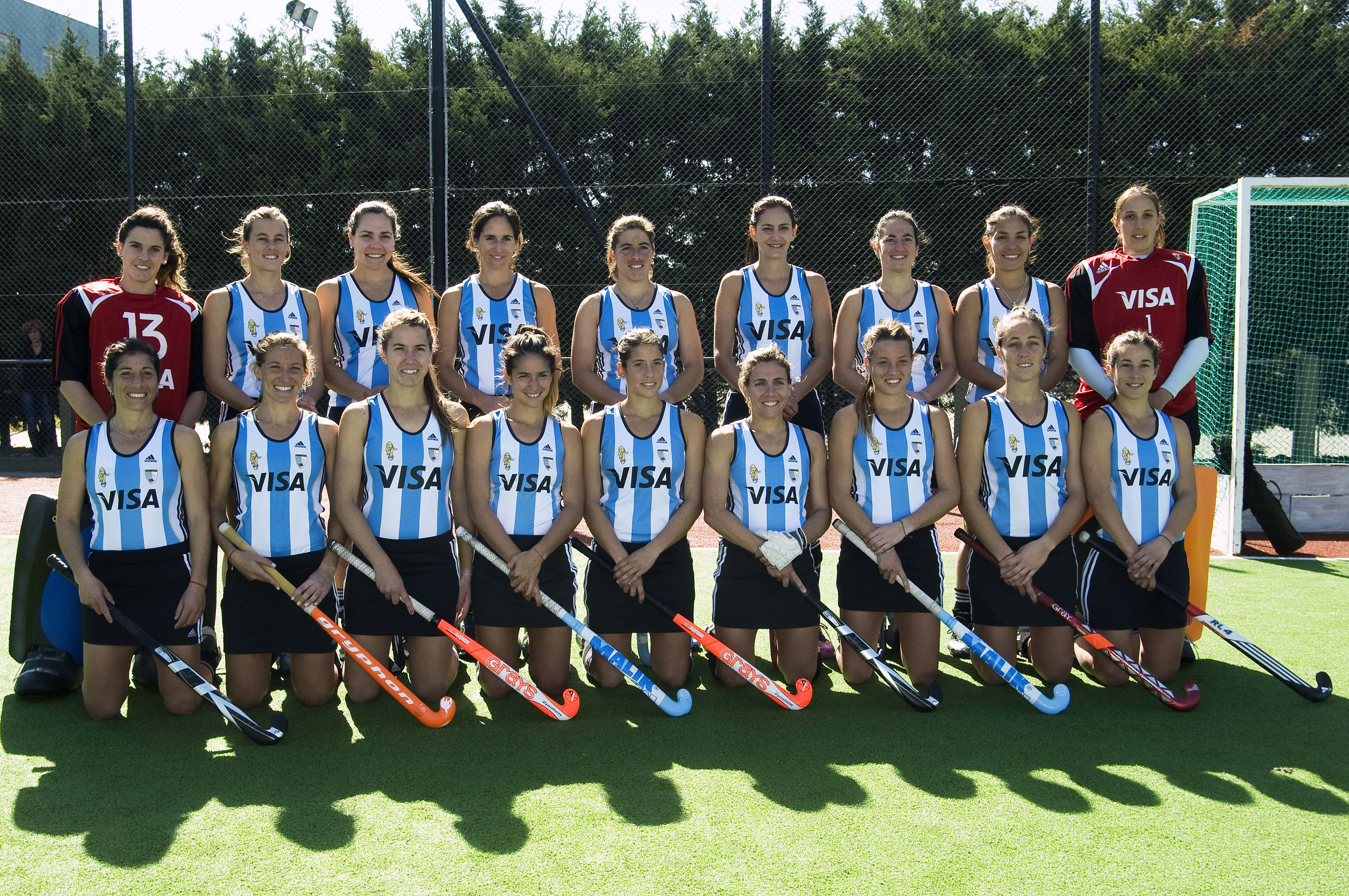
The Argentine squad, champions

Location of the World Cup venue

The 2010 Women's Hockey World Cup was the 12th edition of the Women's Hockey World Cup field hockey tournament. It was held from 29 August to 11 September 2010 in Rosario, Argentina.

Argentina won the tournament for the second time after defeating defending champions the Netherlands 3–1 in the final. The final took place in front of a capacity crowd of 12,000. England won the third place match by defeating Germany 2–0 to claim their first ever World Cup medal.

== Background ==
After Argentina was confirmed as host nation, it was decided to hold the tournament in Buenos Aires in a new stadium built in GEBA's grounds, but the club later refused to organize it due to economical difficulties. The second option had been the Jockey Club de Rosario, venue of the 2014 Champions Trophy, but the local government of Rosario decided instead to build a new stadium with a capacity for 12,000 people with mobile grandstands in Fisherton, a neighbourhood located in the western part of the city.

== Qualification ==
Each of the continental champions from five federations and the host nation received an automatic berth. The European and Asian federations received two and one extra quotas respectively based upon the FIH World Rankings at the completion of the 2008 Summer Olympics. In addition to the three winners of each of the three Qualifiers, the following twelve teams, shown with final pre-tournament rankings, competed in this tournament.

Dates	Event	Location	Qualifier(s)
Host nation			Argentina (2)
7–15 February 2009	2009 Pan American Cup	Hamilton, Bermuda	—^{1}
10–18 July 2009	2009 Africa Cup of Nations	Accra, Ghana	South Africa (12)
22–29 August 2009	2009 EuroHockey Championship	Amsterdam, Netherlands	Netherlands (1); Germany (4); England (6); Spain (8)
25–29 August 2009	2009 Oceania Cup	Invercargill, New Zealand	New Zealand (7)
29 October–8 November 2009	2009 Asia Cup	Bangkok, Thailand	China (3); India (13)
26 March–3 April 2010	Qualifier 1	San Diego, United States	South Korea (11)
17–26 April 2010	Qualifier 2	Kazan, Russia	Japan (9)
24 April–2 May 2010	Qualifier 3	Santiago, Chile	Australia (5)

^1–Argentina qualified both as host and continental champion, therefore that quota was given to the European federation allowing Spain to qualify directly to the World Cup as the fourth placed team at the 2009 EuroHockey Nations Championship

== Competition format ==
Twelve teams competed in the tournament with the competition consisting of two rounds. In the first round, teams were divided into two pools of six teams, and played in a round-robin format with each of the teams playing all other teams in the pool once. Teams were awarded three points for a win, one point for a draw and zero points for a loss. At the end of the pool matches, teams were ranked in their pool according to the following criteria in order:

- Total points accumulated
- Number of matches won
- Goal difference
- Goals for
- The result of the match played between the teams in question

Following the completion of the pool games, teams placed first and second in each pool advanced to a single-elimination round consisting of two semifinal games, a third place play-off and a final. Remaining teams competed in classification matches to determine their ranking in the tournament. During these matches, extra time of 7½ minutes per half was played if teams were tied at the end of regulation time. During extra time, play followed golden goal rules with the first team to score declared the winner. If no goals were scored during extra time, a penalty stroke competition took place.

== Umpires ==
Below are the 16 umpires appointed by the International Hockey Federation:

- Claire Adenot (FRA)
- Julie Ashton-Lucy (AUS)
- Stella Bartlema (NED)
- Frances Block (ENG)
- Marelize de Klerk (RSA)
- Carolina de la Fuente (ARG)
- Elena Eskina (RUS)
- Amy Hassick (USA)
- Kelly Hudson (NZL)
- Soledad Iparraguirre (ARG)
- Michelle Joubert (RSA)
- Carol Metchette (IRL)
- Miao Lin (CHN)
- Irene Presenqui (ARG)
- Lisa Roach (AUS)
- Wendy Stewart (CAN)

== Results ==
All times are Argentina time (UTC−03:00)

=== First round ===
==== Pool A ====
Pos	Team	Pld	W	D	L	GF	GA	GD	Pts	Qualification
1	Netherlands	5	5	0	0	25	8	+17	15	Semi-finals
2	Germany	5	4	0	1	10	4	+6	12	Semi-finals
3	Australia	5	3	0	2	13	10	+3	9	
4	New Zealand	5	1	1	3	9	15	−6	4	
5	India	5	1	0	4	7	20	−13	3	
6	Japan	5	0	1	4	6	13	−7	1	

Source: FIH
Rules for classification: 1) points; 2) goal difference; 3) goals scored; 4) head-to-head result.

30 August 2010
14:30

Netherlands	7–1	India
Agliotti 8'; Hoog 24'; Lammers 28', 45'; Paumen 41', 49', 60'	Report	Rani R. 22'

Umpires:
Julie Ashton Lucy (AUS)
Frances Block (ENG)

30 August 2010
17:00

Germany	2–0	New Zealand
Wilde 15'; Bachmann 17'	Report

Umpires:
Soledad Iparraguirre (ARG)
Wendy Stewart (CAN)

30 August 2010
19:30

Australia	2–1	Japan
McGurk 14'; Blyth 61'	Report	Chiba 63'

Umpires:
Amy Hassick (USA)
Carolina de la Fuente (ARG)

1 September 2010
14:30

India	3–6	Australia
Rani R. 30', 62'; Ritu 42'	Report	Blyth 17'; Nelson 34', 58'; Eastham 52'; Arrold 55'; Liddelow 64'

Umpires:
Kelly Hudson (NZL)
Soledad Iparraguirre (ARG)

1 September 2010
17:00

Netherlands	7–3	New Zealand
Hoog 3', 60'; Lammers 16'; Agliotti 36'; Paumen 38'; Van der Pols 39'; Schopman 49'	Report	Forgesson 2', 65', 70'

Umpires:
Marelize de Klerk (RSA)
Carol Metchette (IRL)

1 September 2010
19:30

Germany	2–1	Japan
Stöckel 57'; Keller 61'	Report	Murakami 39'

Umpires:
Elena Eskina (RUS)
Stella Bartlema (NED)

3 September 2010
16:30

India	1–4	Germany
Rani R. 24'	Report	Hoffmann 22'; Stöckel 32'; Keller 36'; Haase 49'

Umpires:
Carol Metchette (IRL)
Amy Hassick (USA)

3 September 2010
19:00

Australia	1–4	Netherlands
Arrold 21'	Report	Paumen 10', 34', 40'; Smeets 46'

Umpires:
Michelle Joubert (RSA)
Frances Block (ENG)

3 September 2010
21:30

Japan	2–2	New Zealand
Chiba 47'; Nakashima 54'	Report	Forgesson 56'; Sharland 57'

Umpires:
Irene Presenqui (ARG)
Lisa Roach (AUS)

5 September 2010
14:30

Japan	0–2	India
	Report	Rani R. 14'; Jajeet 42'

Umpires:
Miao Lin (CHN)
Julie Ashton-Lucy (AUS)

5 September 2010
17:00

Germany	1–2	Netherlands
Stöckel 3'	Report	Paumen 39'; Lammers 69'

Umpires:
Lisa Roach (AUS)
Soledad Iparraguirre (ARG)

5 September 2010
19:30

New Zealand	1–4	Australia
Forgesson 5'	Report	McGurk 12'; Nelson 57', 65'; Liddelow 63'

Umpires:
Carolina De La Fuente (ARG)
Carol Metchette (IRL)

7 September 2010
14:30

New Zealand	3–0	India
Sharland 44', 54'; Glynn 51'	Report

Umpires:
Amy Hassick (USA)
Michelle Joubert (RSA)

7 September 2010
17:00

Netherlands	5–2	Japan
Van As 2'; Paumen 10', 54'; Welten 38'; Lammers 49'	Report	Chiba 67', 69'

Umpires:
Lisa Roach (AUS)
Miao Lin (CHN)

7 September 2010
19:30

Australia	0–1	Germany
	Report	Bachmann 43'

Umpires:
Soledad Iparraguirre (ARG)
Wendy Stewart (CAN)

==== Pool B ====
Pos	Team	Pld	W	D	L	GF	GA	GD	Pts	Qualification
1	Argentina	5	5	0	0	14	2	+12	15	Semi-finals
2	England	5	3	1	1	7	6	+1	10	Semi-finals
3	South Korea	5	2	2	1	10	8	+2	8	
4	China	5	2	0	3	11	6	+5	6	
5	South Africa	5	1	0	4	9	17	−8	3	
6	Spain	5	0	1	4	5	17	−12	1	

Source: FIH
Rules for classification: 1) points; 2) goal difference; 3) goals scored; 4) head-to-head result.

29 August 2010
14:30

China	1–2	South Korea
Zhao 11'	Report	Kim Y. 23'; Park M. 51'

Umpires:
Kelly Hudson (NZL)
Lisa Roach (USA)

29 August 2010
17:00

Spain	2–3	England
Comerma 4'; Petchamé 31'	Report	Danson 17'; Cullen 28'; Gilbert 35'

Umpires:
Marelize de Klerk (RSA)
Elena Eskina (RUS)

29 August 2010
19:30

Argentina	5–2	South Africa
Barrionuevo 16'; Aymar 37', 39', 63'; Russo 69'	Report	Coetzee 22'; Ryan 65'

Umpires:
Carol Metchette (IRL)
Stella Bartlema (NED)

31 August 2010
14:30

China	0–1	England
	Report	MacLeod 2'

Umpires:
Irene Presenqui (ARG)
Julie Ashton-Lucy (AUS)

31 August 2010
17:00

South Africa	2–1	Spain
Coetzee 21'; Damons 61'	Report	Camón 31'

Umpires:
Lisa Roach (AUS)
Carolina de la Fuente (ARG)

31 August 2010
19:30

Argentina	1–0	South Korea
Rebecchi 45'	Report

Umpires:
Miao Lin (CHN)
Michelle Joubert (RSA)

3 September 2010
09:00

South Africa	1–4	China
Wilson 16'	Report	Ren 26'; Fu 44'; Gao 58', 60'

Umpires:
Stella Bartlema (NED)
Carolina de la Fuente (ARG)

3 September 2010
11:30

England	1–1	South Korea
Richardson 37'	Report	Kim J. 1'

Umpires:
Soledad Iparraguirre (ARG)
Wendy Stewart (CAN)

3 September 2010
14:00

Spain	0–4	Argentina
	Report	Barrionuevo 13', 47'; Gulla 14'; Luchetti 40'

Umpires:
Julie Ashton-Lucy (AUS)
Marelize de Klerk (RSA)

4 September 2010
14:30

England	2–1	South Africa
Richardson 9', 48'	Report	Coetzee 58'

Umpires:
Carolina De La Fuente (ARG)
Kelly Hudson (NZL)

4 September 2010
17:00

South Korea	2–2	Spain
Kim B. 7'; Cheon 35'	Report	Comerma 32'; Muñoz 38'

Umpires:
Frances Block (ENG)
Carol Metchette (IRL)

4 September 2010
19:30

China	0–2	Argentina
	Report	Barrionuevo 51'; Aymar 60'

Umpires:
Wendy Stewart (CAN)
Michelle Joubert (RSA)

6 September 2010
14:30

Spain	0–6	China
	Report	Li H. 11'; Fu 42'; Ma Y. 49', 58', 63', 66'

Umpires:
Elena Eskina (RUS)
Marelize de Klerk (RSA)

6 September 2010
17:00

South Korea	5–3	South Africa
Lee 34'; Kim B. 55'; Cheon 58'; Kim Y. 61'; Park M. 67'	Report	Damons 2'; Botha 50', 52'

Umpires:
Irene Presenqui (ARG)
Wendy Stewart (CAN)

6 September 2010
19:30

Argentina	2–0	England
Barrionuevo 13'; Sruoga 67'	Report

Umpires:
Stella Bartlema (NED)
Julie Ashton-Lucy (AUS)

=== Fifth to twelfth place classification ===
==== Eleventh and twelfth place ====
9 September 2010
13:30

Japan	2–1	Spain
Murakami 62'; Chiba 68'	Report	Cruz 52'

Umpires:
Kelly Hudson (NZL)
Amy Hassick (USA)

==== Ninth and tenth place ====
10 September 2010
13:30

India	4–3	South Africa
Rani R. 9', 10'; Anjum 37'; Jasjeet 56'	Report	George 3'; Ryan 27'; Coetzee 58'

Umpires:
Stella Bartlema (NED)
Miao Lin (CHN)

==== Seventh and eighth place ====
10 September 2010
16:00

New Zealand	3–0	China
Forgesson 2'; C. Harrison 13'; Eshuis 66'	Report

Umpires:
Irene Presenqui (ARG)
Carolina de la Fuente (ARG)

==== Fifth and sixth place ====
10 September 2010
19:30

Australia	2–1	South Korea
Eastham 33'; Arrold 68'	Report	Kim Y. 22'

Umpires:
Carol Metchette (IRL)
Wendy Stewart (CAN)

=== First to fourth place classification ===
Semi-finals
9 September 2010
Netherlands (p.s.o)	1 (4)
England	1 (3)
9 September 2010
Argentina	2
Germany	1

Final
11 September 2010
Netherlands	1
Argentina	3
Third place
11 September 2010
England	2
Germany	0

==== Semifinals ====
9 September 2010
16:30

Netherlands	1–1 (a.e.t.)	England
Paumen 61'	Report	MacLeod 56'
Penalties
Paumen (penalty shoot-out scored); Schopman (penalty shoot-out scored); Goderie (penalty shoot-out scored); Welten (penalty shoot-out missed); Lammers (penalty shoot-out scored)	4–3	(penalty shoot-out scored) Richardson; (penalty shoot-out scored) Cullen; (penalty shoot-out missed) Walsh; (penalty shoot-out missed) Craddock; (penalty shoot-out scored) Rogers

Umpires:
Lisa Roach (AUS)
Michelle Joubert (RSA)

9 September 2010
19:30

Argentina	2–1	Germany
Aymar 25'; Luchetti 63'	Report	Stöckel 69'

Umpires:
Frances Block (ENG)
Julie Ashton-Lucy (AUS)

==== Third and fourth place ====
11 September 2010
16:30

England	2–0	Germany
Danson 28'; Richardson 31'	Report

Umpires:
Soledad Iparraguirre (ARG)
Carolina de la Fuente (ARG)

==== Final ====
11 September 2010
19:30

Netherlands	1–3	Argentina
Paumen 44'	Report 1 Report 2	Rebecchi 3', 54'; Barrionuevo 7'

Umpires:
Lisa Roach (AUS)
Marelize de Klerk (RSA)

Team details

Netherlands
Argentina

GK	22	Joyce Sombroek
DF	15	Janneke Schopman (c)
DF	21	Sophie Polkamp
MF	9	Wieke Dijkstra
MF	13	Minke Smeets
MF	18	Naomi van As
MF	19	Ellen Hoog
MF	24	Eva de Goede
MF	27	Michelle van der Pols
FW	12	Lidewij Welten
FW	17	Maartje Paumen
Substitutions:
MF	5	Carlien van den Heuvel	(substituted on) 9'
FW	10	Kelly Jonker	(substituted on) 8'
FW	11	Maartje Goderie	(substituted on) 10'
FW	23	Kim Lammers	(substituted on) 7'
Manager:
(Netherlands) Herman Kruis

GK	1	Belén Succi
DF	2	Mariana Rossi
DF	21	Mariela Scarone
DF	24	Claudia Burkart
DF	25	Silvina D'Elía
DF	27	Noel Barrionuevo
MF	4	Rosario Luchetti
MF	8	Luciana Aymar (c)
MF	19	Mariné Russo
FW	10	Soledad García
FW	11	Carla Rebecchi
Substitutions:
DF	5	Macarena Rodríguez	(substituted on) 27'
FW	7	Alejandra Gulla	(substituted on) 27'
FW	12	Delfina Merino	(substituted on) 8'
MF	18	Daniela Sruoga	(substituted on) 16'
Manager:
(Argentina) Carlos Retegui

== Awards ==
Top Goalscorer	Player of the Tournament	Goalkeeper of the Tournament	Young Player of the Tournament	Fair Play Trophy
(Netherlands) Maartje Paumen	(Argentina) Luciana Aymar	(England) Beth Storry	(India) Rani Rampal	Australia

== Statistics ==
=== Final standings ===
Pos	Grp	Team	Pld	W	D	L	GF	GA	GD	Pts	Final result
1st place, gold medalist(s)	B	Argentina (H)	7	7	0	0	19	4	+15	21	Gold medal
2nd place, silver medalist(s)	A	Netherlands	7	5	1	1	27	12	+15	16	Silver medal
3rd place, bronze medalist(s)	B	England	7	4	2	1	10	7	+3	14	Bronze medal
4	A	Germany	7	4	0	3	11	8	+3	12	Fourth place
5	A	Australia	6	4	0	2	15	11	+4	12	Eliminated in group stage
6	B	South Korea	6	2	2	2	11	10	+1	8	Eliminated in group stage
7	A	New Zealand	6	2	1	3	12	15	−3	7	Eliminated in group stage
8	B	China	6	2	0	4	11	9	+2	6	Eliminated in group stage
9	A	India	6	2	0	4	11	23	−12	6	Eliminated in group stage
10	B	South Africa	6	1	0	5	12	21	−9	3	Eliminated in group stage
11	A	Japan	6	1	1	4	8	14	−6	4	Eliminated in group stage
12	B	Spain	6	0	1	5	6	19	−13	1	Eliminated in group stage

Source: FIH
(H) Hosts

=== Goalscorers ===
There were 153 goals scored in 38 matches, for an average of 4.03 goals per match.

12 goals

- (Netherlands) Maartje Paumen

7 goals

- (India) Rani Rampal

6 goals

- (Argentina) Noel Barrionuevo
- (New Zealand) Krystal Forgesson

5 goals

- (Argentina) Luciana Aymar
- (Japan) Kaori Chiba
- (Netherlands) Kim Lammers

4 goals

- (Australia) Ashleigh Nelson
- (China) Ma Yibo
- (England) Helen Richardson
- (Germany) Maike Stöckel
- (South Africa) Pietie Coetzee

3 goals

- (Argentina) Carla Rebecchi
- (Australia) Nicole Arrold
- (Netherlands) Ellen Hoog
- (New Zealand) Kayla Sharland
- (South Korea) Kim Young-Ran

2 goals

- (Argentina) Rosario Luchetti
- (Australia) Madonna Blyth
- (Australia) Casey Eastham
- (Australia) Shelly Liddelow
- (Australia) Kobie McGurk
- (China) Fu Baorong
- (China) Gao Lihua
- (England) Alex Danson
- (England) Hannah MacLeod
- (Germany) Tina Bachmann
- (Germany) Natascha Keller
- (India) Jasjeet Kaur Handa
- (Japan) Ai Murakami
- (Netherlands) Marilyn Agliotti
- (South Africa) Cindy Botha
- (South Africa) Sulette Damons
- (South Africa) Vida Ryan
- (South Korea) Cheon Seul-Ki
- (South Korea) Kim Bo-Mi
- (South Korea) Park Mi-Hyun
- (Spain) Gloria Comerma

1 goal

- (Argentina) Alejandra Gulla
- (Argentina) Mariné Russo
- (Argentina) Daniela Sruoga
- (China) Li Hongxia
- (China) Ren Ye
- (China) Zhao Yudiao
- (England) Crista Cullen
- (England) Susie Gilbert
- (Germany) Lydia Haase
- (Germany) Eileen Hoffmann
- (Germany) Celine Wilde
- (India) Saba Anjum Karim
- (India) Ritu Rani
- (Japan) Mie Nakashima
- (Netherlands) Janneke Schopman
- (Netherlands) Minke Smeets
- (Netherlands) Naomi van As
- (Netherlands) Michelle van der Pols
- (Netherlands) Lidewij Welten
- (New Zealand) Clarissa Eshuis
- (New Zealand) Katie Glynn
- (New Zealand) Charlotte Harrison
- (South Africa) Lesle-Ann George
- (South Africa) Jennifer Wilson
- (South Korea) Kim Jong-Eun
- (South Korea) Lee Seon-Ok
- (Spain) Núria Camón
- (Spain) Montse Cruz
- (Spain) Silvia Muñoz
- (Spain) Carlota Petchamé

Source: FIH
