= 2012 Women's VISA International Hockey Tournament =

Field hockey tournament

VISA International
Tournament details
- Host country: United Kingdom
- City: London
- Dates: 2–6 May
- Teams: 4 (from 3 confederations)
- Venue: Riverbank Arena

Final positions
- Champions: Great Britain
- Runner-up: Argentina
- Third place: South Korea

Tournament statistics
- Matches played: 8
- Goals scored: 19 (2.38 per match)
- Top scorer: (United Kingdom) Crista Cullen (4 goals)

The 2012 Women's VISA International Hockey Tournament was a women's field hockey tournament, consisting of a series of test matches. It was held in London, United Kingdom, from May 2 to 6, 2012. The tournament served as a test event for the field hockey tournament at the 2012 Summer Olympics. The tournament featured four of the top nations in women's field hockey.

Great Britain won the tournament after defeating Argentina 2–0 in the final. South Korea finished in third place after defeating China 3–2 in the third place playoff.

== Competition format ==
The tournament featured the national teams of Argentina, China, South Korea, and the hosts, Great Britain, competing in a round-robin format, with each team playing each other once. Three points were awarded for a win, one for a draw, and none for a loss.

Country	Best World Cup finish	Best Olympic Games finish
Argentina	Champions (2002, 2010)	Runners-up (2000)
China	Third Place (2002)	Runners-up (2008)
Great Britain *	Third Place (2010)	Third Place (1992)
South Korea	Third place (1990)	Runners-up (1988, 1996)

* Includes results representing England.

== Results ==
=== Pool stage ===
Pos	Team	Pld	W	D	L	GF	GA	GD	Pts	Qualification
1	Great Britain (H)	3	3	0	0	6	0	+6	9	Final
2	Argentina	3	1	1	1	3	2	+1	4	Final
3	South Korea	3	1	1	1	2	2	0	4	
4	China	3	0	0	3	1	8	−7	0	

Source: GB Hockey
Rules for classification: 1) Points; 2) Goal difference; 3) Goals scored; 4) Games won; 5) Head-to-head.
(H) Hosts

2 May 2012
11:00

Argentina	3–0	China
D. Sruoga 12'; Rebecchi 34'; D'Elía 49'	Report

Umpires:
Claire Adenot (FRA)
Frances Block (GBR)

2 May 2012
13:15

Great Britain	1–0	South Korea
Danson 62'	Report

Umpires:
Amy Hassick (USA)
Elena Eskina (RUS)

3 May 2012
11:00

Argentina	0–0	South Korea
	Report

Umpires:
Carol Metchette (IRE)
Claire Adenot (FRA)

3 May 2012
13:15

China	0–3	Great Britain
	Report	Cullen 6', 70+'; Gilbert 68'

Umpires:
Elena Eskina (RUS)
Stella Bartlema (NED)

5 May 2012
09:30

China	1–2	South Korea
Sun 7'	Report	Kim J. 19', 58'

Umpires:
Frances Block (GBR)
Carol Metchette (IRE)

5 May 2012
11:45

Great Britain	2–0	Argentina
Danson 15'; Ball 23'	Report

Umpires:
Amy Hassick (USA)
Stella Bartlema (NED)

=== Classification matches ===
==== Third and fourth place ====
6 May 2012
09:30

South Korea	3–2	China
Lee S. 2'; Park K. 11'; Cheon S. 41'	Report	Zhao 27'; Li H. 68'

Umpires:
Claire Adenot (FRA)
Carol Metchette (IRE)

==== Final ====
6 May 2012
12:15

Great Britain	2–0	Argentina
Cullen 37', 42'	Report

Umpires:
Elena Eskina (RUS)
Amy Hassick (USA)

== Statistics ==
=== Final standings ===
As per statistical convention in field hockey, matches decided in extra time are counted as wins and losses, while matches decided by penalty shoot-outs are counted as draws.

Pos	Team	Pld	W	D	L	GF	GA	GD	Pts	Final Result
1st place, gold medalist(s)	Great Britain (H)	4	4	0	0	8	0	+8	12	Gold Medal
2nd place, silver medalist(s)	Argentina	4	1	1	2	3	4	−1	4	Silver Medal
3rd place, bronze medalist(s)	South Korea	4	2	1	1	5	4	+1	7	Bronze Medal
4	China	4	0	0	4	3	11	−8	0	Fourth Place

Source: GB Hockey
(H) Hosts

=== Goalscorers ===
There were 19 goals scored in 8 matches, for an average of 2.38 goals per match.

4 goals

- (United Kingdom) Crista Cullen

2 goals

- (United Kingdom) Alex Danson
- (South Korea) Kim Jong-eun

1 goal

- (Argentina) Silvina D'Elía
- (Argentina) Carla Rebecchi
- (Argentina) Daniela Sruoga
- (China) Li Hongxia
- (China) Sun Sinan
- (China) Zhao Yudiao
- (United Kingdom) Ashleigh Ball
- (United Kingdom) Susie Gilbert
- (South Korea) Park Ki-ju
- (South Korea) Lee Seon-ok
- (South Korea) Cheon Seul-ki

Source: GB Hockey
