= FIH Awards =

Annual award in hockey

- Description: Best field hockey players in the world
- Country: International
- Presented by: International Hockey Federation (FIH)
- First award: 1998
- Website: www.fih.hockey

The FIH Awards are awarded annually by the International Hockey Federation to the male and female field hockey players adjudged to be the best in the world. The awards were established in 1998 and have been awarded annually ever since. In 2001 the FIH Young Player of the Year award was created, to be awarded to the best young field hockey player of the year.

== Male Player of the Year ==
Year	Player(s)	Ref
1998	(Netherlands) Stephan Veen	
1999	(Australia) Jay Stacy	
2000	(Netherlands) Stephan Veen	
2001	(Germany) Florian Kunz	
2002	(Germany) Michael Green	
2003	(Netherlands) Teun de Nooijer	
2004	(Australia) Jamie Dwyer	
2005	(Netherlands) Teun de Nooijer; (Australia) Jamie Dwyer; (Argentina) Jorge Lombi; (Australia) Troy Elder; (Australia) Brent Livermore; (India) Devesh Chauhan; (India) Dilip Tirkey; (Pakistan) Sohail Abbas; (Pakistan) Waseem Ahmed; (Spain) Pol Amat; (Spain) Xavier Ribas	
2006	(Netherlands) Teun de Nooijer; (Australia) Brent Livermore; (Australia) Stephen Mowlam; (Germany) Philipp Crone; (South Korea) Kim Yong-Bae; (Netherlands) Jeroen Delmee; (New Zealand) Ryan Archibald; (Spain) Pol Amat	
2007	(Australia) Jamie Dwyer; (Germany) Matthias Witthaus; (India) Prabhjot Singh; (South Korea) Seo Jong-Ho; (Netherlands) Teun de Nooijer; (Netherlands) Rob Reckers; (Pakistan) Dilawar Hussain; (Spain) Eduard Tubau	
2008	(Spain) Pol Amat; (Australia) Jamie Dwyer; (Australia) Bevan George; (England) Barry Middleton; (Germany) Timo Weß; (Germany) Tibor Weißenborn; (Netherlands) Teun de Nooijer; (Netherlands) Robert van der Horst	
2009	(Australia) Jamie Dwyer; (England) Barry Middleton; (Germany) Christopher Zeller; (South Korea) Seo Jong-Ho; (Netherlands) Teun de Nooijer; (Spain) Pol Amat	
2010	(Australia) Jamie Dwyer; (England) Barry Middleton; (Germany) Moritz Fürste; (South Korea) Seo Jong-Ho; (Netherlands) Teun de Nooijer	
2011	(Australia) Jamie Dwyer; (Australia) Eddie Ockenden; (Germany) Moritz Fürste; (Germany) Max Müller; (Netherlands) Teun de Nooijer	
2012	(Germany) Moritz Fürste; (Australia) Jamie Dwyer; (Germany) Tobias Hauke; (India) Sardara Singh; (Netherlands) Robert van der Horst	
2013	(Germany) Tobias Hauke; (Argentina) Lucas Vila; (Australia) Kieran Govers; (Australia) Mark Knowles; (Belgium) Tom Boon; (Belgium) John-John Dohmen; (England) Barry Middleton; (Germany) Moritz Fürste; (Germany) Maximilian Müller; (Netherlands) Robbert Kemperman	
2014	(Australia) Mark Knowles; (Australia) Eddie Ockenden; (England) Ashley Jackson; (Netherlands) Robbert Kemperman; (Netherlands) Robert van der Horst	
2015	(Netherlands) Robert van der Horst; (Australia) Chris Ciriello; (Australia) Mark Knowles; (Belgium) John-John Dohmen; (Germany) Tobias Hauke	
2016	(Belgium) John-John Dohmen; (Argentina) Pedro Ibarra; (Argentina) Gonzalo Peillat; (Germany) Moritz Fürste; (Germany) Tobias Hauke	
2017	(Belgium) Arthur Van Doren; (Argentina) Gonzalo Peillat; (Germany) Mats Grambusch; (Netherlands) Billy Bakker; (Netherlands) Mirco Pruyser	
2018	(Belgium) Arthur Van Doren; (Netherlands) Billy Bakker; (Belgium) Simon Gougnard; (United Kingdom) Barry Middleton; (Australia) Jake Whetton	
2019	(India) Manpreet Singh; (Argentina) Lucas Vila; (Australia) Eddie Ockenden; (Australia) Aran Zalewski; (Belgium) Arthur Van Doren; (Belgium) Victor Wegnez	
2020–21	(India) Harmanpreet Singh; (Australia) Tim Brand; (Belgium) Arthur Van Doren; (Belgium) Alexander Hendrickx; (Australia) Jake Whetton; (Australia) Aran Zalewski	
2022	(India) Harmanpreet Singh; (Belgium) Tom Boon; (Netherlands) Thierry Brinkman; (Belgium) Arthur De Sloover; (Germany) Niklas Wellen	
2023	(India) Hardik Singh; (Netherlands) Thierry Brinkman; (Australia) Jeremy Hayward; (England) Zachary Wallace; (Netherlands) Niklas Wellen	
2024	(India) Harmanpreet Singh; (Netherlands) Joep de Mol; (Netherlands) Thierry Brinkman; (Germany) Hannes Müller; (England) Zachary Wallace	
2025	(Belgium) Tom Boon; (Netherlands) Thierry Brinkman; (Argentina) Nicolás Della Torre	
2026	(Argentina) Tomás Domene; (Belgium) Tom Boon; (Germany) Justus Weigand	

== Female Player of the Year ==
Year	Player(s)	Ref
1998	(Australia) Alyson Annan	
1999	(Germany) Natascha Keller	
2000	(Australia) Alyson Annan	
2001	(Argentina) Luciana Aymar	
2002	(Argentina) Cecilia Rognoni	
2003	(Netherlands) Mijntje Donners	
2004	(Argentina) Luciana Aymar	
2005	(Argentina) Luciana Aymar; (Australia) Katie Allen (Australia) Julie Towers (China) Fu Baorong (China) Nie Yali (Japan) Sachimi Iwao (Netherlands) Minke Booij (Netherlands) Mijntje Donners (Spain) Núria Camón	
2006	(Netherlands) Minke Booij; (Argentina) Luciana Aymar; (China) Fu Baorong; (Germany) Natascha Keller; (Germany) Fanny Rinne; (Japan) Kaori Chiba; (Netherlands) Janneke Schopman; (Spain) María Jesús Rosa	
2007	(Argentina) Luciana Aymar; (Australia) Peta Gallagher; (China) Ma Yibo; (Germany) Fanny Rinne; (Japan) Kaori Chiba; (Netherlands) Marilyn Agliotti; (Netherlands) Minke Booij; (United States) Amy Tran	
2008	(Argentina) Luciana Aymar; (Argentina) Carla Rebecchi; (China) Fu Baorong; (Germany) Natascha Keller; (Germany) Fanny Rinne; (Netherlands) Minke Booij; (Netherlands) Janneke Schopman; (Netherlands) Naomi van As	
2009	(Argentina) Luciana Aymar; (Netherlands) Naomi van As; (Australia) Madonna Blyth; (China) Fu Baorong; (England) Helen Richardson; (Germany) Natascha Keller	
2010	(Argentina) Luciana Aymar; (Argentina) Soledad García; (China) Fu Baorong; (Germany) Natascha Keller; (Netherlands) Maartje Paumen	
2011	(Netherlands) Maartje Paumen; (Argentina) Luciana Aymar; (China) Li Hongxia; (Germany) Natascha Keller; (South Africa) Pietie Coetzee	
2012	(Netherlands) Maartje Paumen; (Argentina) Luciana Aymar; (England) Crista Cullen; (Netherlands) Kim Lammers; (New Zealand) Kayla Sharland	
2013	(Argentina) Luciana Aymar; (Argentina) Carla Rebecchi (Australia) Madonna Blyth (England) Alex Danson (Germany) Tina Bachmann (Netherlands) Eva de Goede (Netherlands) Ellen Hoog (Netherlands) Maartje Paumen (New Zealand) Kayla Sharland (South Korea) Park Mi-Hyun	
2014	(Netherlands) Ellen Hoog; (Argentina) Luciana Aymar (Netherlands) Maartje Paumen (Netherlands) Lidewij Welten (United States) Lauren Crandall	
2015	(Netherlands) Lidewij Welten; (Argentina) Delfina Merino (Australia) Jodie Kenny (United Kingdom) Alex Danson (South Korea) Park Mi-Hyun	
2016	(Netherlands) Naomi van As; (Argentina) Carla Rebecchi (United Kingdom) Alex Danson (United Kingdom) Kate Richardson-Walsh (New Zealand) Stacey Michelsen	
2017	(Argentina) Delfina Merino; (United Kingdom) Alex Danson (Netherlands) Lidewij Welten (New Zealand) Stacey Michelsen (United States) Melissa Gonzalez	
2018	(Netherlands) Eva de Goede; (Netherlands) Xan de Waard (New Zealand) Stacey Michelsen (Spain) Georgina Oliva (Netherlands) Lidewij Welten	
2019	(Netherlands) Eva de Goede; (Argentina) Carla Rebecchi (Germany) Janne Müller-Wieland (Netherlands) Frédérique Matla (New Zealand) Stacey Michelsen (New Zealand) Olivia Merry	
2020–21	(India) Gurjit Kaur; (Argentina) Agustina Albertarrio (Netherlands) Eva de Goede (Argentina) Agustina Gorzelany (Netherlands) Frédérique Matla (Netherlands) Maria Verschoor	
2022	(Netherlands) Felice Albers; (Argentina) María José Granatto (Argentina) Agustina Gorzelany (Netherlands) Frédérique Matla (Spain) Georgina Oliva	
2023	(Netherlands) Xan de Waard; (Belgium) Charlotte Englebert (Australia) Ambrosia Malone (Argentina) Eugenia Trinchinetti (Germany) Sonja Zimmermann	
2024	(Netherlands) Yibbi Jansen; (China) Gu Bingfeng (Netherlands) Xan de Waard (Germany) Nike Lorenz (Belgium) Stephanie Vanden Borre	
2025	(Netherlands) Xan de Waard; (Belgium) Alix Gerniers (China) Li Hong	
2026	(Argentina) Sofía Cairó; (Netherlands) Xan de Waard; (Belgium) Charlotte Englebert	

== Young Male Player of the Year ==
Year	Player(s)	Ref
2001	(Germany) Tibor Weißenborn	
2002	(Australia) Jamie Dwyer	
2003	(Australia) Grant Schubert	
2004	(Spain) Santi Freixa	
2005	(Netherlands) Robert van der Horst	
2006	(Germany) Christopher Zeller; (Australia) Mark Knowles (Netherlands) Robert van der Horst (Pakistan) Shakeel Abbasi (Spain) David Alegre (Spain) Santi Freixa	
2007	(Australia) Mark Knowles; (Argentina) Lucas Vila (Germany) Moritz Fürste (England) Liam Doidge (Netherlands) Robert van der Horst (Spain) Sergi Enrique	
2008	(Australia) Eddie Ockenden; (Australia) Desmond Abbott (England) Ashley Jackson (New Zealand) Simon Child (Netherlands) Jeroen Hertzberger	
2009	(England) Ashley Jackson; (Australia) Eddie Ockenden (Germany) Tobias Hauke (New Zealand) Simon Child (Netherlands) Robbert Kemperman (Spain) Sergi Enrique	
2010	(Germany) Tobias Hauke; (England) Ashley Jackson (Germany) Florian Fuchs (New Zealand) Nick Wilson (Netherlands) Robbert Kemperman	
2011	(Australia) Matthew Swann; (Belgium) Florent van Aubel (Germany) Florian Fuchs (New Zealand) Nick Wilson (Netherlands) Billy Bakker	
2012	(Germany) Florian Fuchs; (Argentina) Gonzalo Peillat (Belgium) Simon Gougnard (England) Harry Martin (Pakistan) Muhammad Rizwan Jr.	
2013	(Germany) Christopher Rühr; (Argentina) Gonzalo Peillat (Belgium) Arthur Van Doren (Germany) Mats Grambusch (India) Manpreet Singh	
2014	(Argentina) Gonzalo Peillat; (Australia) Jeremy Hayward (Belgium) Arthur Van Doren (Germany) Christopher Rühr (India) Akashdeep Singh	
2015	(Germany) Christopher Rühr; (Canada) Sukhi Panesar (India) Akashdeep Singh (Ireland) Shane O'Donoghue (Australia) Blake Govers	
2016	(Belgium) Arthur Van Doren; (Germany) Timm Herzbruch (Germany) Christopher Rühr (India) Harmanpreet Singh (Netherlands) Jorrit Croon	
2017	(Belgium) Arthur Van Doren; (Belgium) Victor Wegnez (Germany) Timm Herzbruch (Netherlands) Thierry Brinkman (Netherlands) Jorrit Croon	
2018	(Belgium) Arthur De Sloover; (Australia) Tim Brand (Australia) Jake Harvie (Germany) Timm Herzbruch (Netherlands) Thijs van Dam	
2019	(India) Vivek Prasad; (Argentina) Maico Casella (Australia) Blake Govers (United Kingdom) Zachary Wallace (Netherlands) Jonas de Geus	
2020-21	(India) Vivek Prasad; (South Africa) Mustaphaa Cassiem (New Zealand) Sean Findlay	
2022	(France) Timothée Clément; (Netherlands) Miles Bukkens (Spain) Pau Cunill (Pakistan) Rizwan Ali (India) Sanjay Rana	
2023	(France) Gaspard Xavier	
2024	(Pakistan) Sufyan Khan; (Argentina) Bautista Capurro (Belgium) Arno Van Dessel (Spain) Bruno Font (Germany) Michel Struthoff	
2025	(Netherlands) Casper van der Veen	
2026	(Germany) Justus Warweg; (Germany) Jakob Brilla; (France) Malo Martinache	

== Young Female Player of the Year ==
Year	Player(s)	Ref
2001	(Australia) Angie Skirving	
2002	(Argentina) Soledad García	
2003	(Netherlands) Maartje Scheepstra	
2004	(Argentina) Soledad García	
2005	(Netherlands) Maartje Goderie	
2006	(South Korea) Park Mi-Hyun; (Australia) Madonna Blyth (England) Crista Cullen (Netherlands) Naomi van As (Spain) Esther Termens (United States) Rachel Dawson	
2007	(Germany) Maike Stöckel; (Australia) Madonna Blyth (South Korea) Park Mi-Hyun (Netherlands) Maartje Goderie	
2008	(Netherlands) Maartje Paumen; (China) Song Qingling (England) Crista Cullen (Germany) Janne Müller-Wieland (Netherlands) Ellen Hoog	
2009	(Australia) Casey Eastham; (Argentina) Josefina Sruoga (England) Susie Gilbert (Japan) Miyuki Nakagawa (New Zealand) Gemma Flynn (Netherlands) Emilie Mol	
2010	(China) Zhao Yudiao; (Argentina) Daniela Sruoga (Australia) Casey Eastham (India) Rani Rampal (Netherlands) Eva de Goede	
2011	(New Zealand) Stacey Michelsen; (Netherlands) Willemijn Bos (Netherlands) Joyce Sombroek (New Zealand) Charlotte Harrison (United States) Katelyn Falgowski	
2012	(Australia) Anna Flanagan; (Argentina) Florencia Habif (Belgium) Erica Coppey (South Korea) Cheon Eun-Bi (New Zealand) Stacey Michelsen	
2013	(Netherlands) Maria Verschoor; (Argentina) Agustina Albertario (Argentina) Florencia Habif (England) Lily Owsley (India) Rani Rampal	
2014	(Argentina) Florencia Habif; (Australia) Anna Flanagan (China) Peng Yang (India) Rani Rampal (Netherlands) Xan de Waard	
2015	(England) Lily Owsley; (Germany) Charlotte Stapenhorst (Netherlands) Xan de Waard (Netherlands) Maria Verschoor (New Zealand) Rose Keddell	
2016	(Argentina) María José Granatto; (Argentina) Florencia Habif (Australia) Kathryn Slattery (Germany) Nike Lorenz (United Kingdom) Lily Owsley	
2017	(Argentina) María José Granatto; (Germany) Nike Lorenz (Netherlands) Xan de Waard (Netherlands) Frédérique Matla (Netherlands) Laura Nunnink	
2018	(Argentina) Lucina von der Heyde; (Germany) Nike Lorenz (Australia) Ambrosia Malone (Ireland) Lena Tice (Netherlands) Marijn Veen	
2019	(India) Lalremsiami; (Argentina) Julieta Jankunas (China) Zhong Jiaqi (Germany) Nike Lorenz (Netherlands) Frédérique Matla	
2020–21	(India) Sharmila Devi; (United Kingdom) Fiona Crackles (Argentina) Valentina Raposo	
2022	(India) Mumtaz Khan; (Netherlands) Jip Dicke (Belgium) Charlotte Englebert (Netherlands) Luna Fokke (Australia) Amy Lawton	
2023	(Spain) Teresa Lima	
2024	(Argentina) Zoe Díaz; (China) Tan Jinzhuang (Belgium) Emily White (Australia) Claire Colwill (Germany) Linnea Weidemann	
2025	(Argentina) Milagros Alastra	
2026	(Argentina) Zoe Díaz; (Australia) Claire Colwill; (Belgium) Famke van Heel	

== Goalkeepers of the Year ==
Year	Male Goalkeeper	Female Goalkeeper	Ref
2014	(Netherlands) Jaap Stockmann; (Argentina) Juan Manuel Vivaldi (Australia) Andrew Charter (England) George Pinner (India) P. R. Sreejesh	(Netherlands) Joyce Sombroek; (Argentina) Belén Succi (Australia) Rachael Lynch (England) Maddie Hinch (United States) Jackie Kintzer	
2015	(Ireland) David Harte; (Australia) Andrew Charter (Canada) David Carter (Netherlands) Jaap Stockmann	(Netherlands) Joyce Sombroek; (China) Li Dongxiao (Germany) Kristina Reynolds (England) Maddie Hinch (South Korea) Jang Soo Ji	
2016	(Ireland) David Harte; (Argentina) Juan Manuel Vivaldi (Belgium) Vincent Vanasch (India) P. R. Sreejesh (Netherlands) Jaap Stockmann	(United Kingdom) Maddie Hinch; (Argentina) Belén Succi (Germany) Kristina Reynolds (Netherlands) Joyce Sombroek (United States) Jackie Briggs	
2017	(Belgium) Vincent Vanasch; (Argentina) Juan Manuel Vivaldi (United Kingdom) George Pinner (Ireland) David Harte (Spain) Quico Cortés	(United Kingdom) Maddie Hinch; (Belgium) Aisling D'Hooghe (China) Li Dongxiao (Netherlands) Anne Veenendaal (United States) Jackie Briggs	
2018	(Belgium) Vincent Vanasch; (Netherlands) Pirmin Blaak (Australia) Tyler Lovell (United Kingdom) George Pinner (Germany) Tobias Walter	(United Kingdom) Maddie Hinch; (China) Ye Jiao (Australia) Rachael Lynch (Ireland) Ayeisha McFerran (Spain) María Ruiz	
2019	(Belgium) Vincent Vanasch; (Australia) Tyler Lovell (Canada) David Carter (Spain) Quico Cortés (Germany) Victor Aly	(Australia) Rachael Lynch; (Spain) Maria Ruiz (France) Mathilde Petriaux (Ireland) Ayeisha McFerran (Japan) Megumi Kageyama	
2020–21	(India) P. R. Sreejesh; (Australia) Andrew Charter (Belgium) Vincent Vanasch	(India) Savita Punia; (United Kingdom) Maddie Hinch (Argentina) Belén Succi	
2022	(India) P. R. Sreejesh; (Netherlands) Pirmin Blaak (Belgium) Loic Van Doren (Germany) Alexander Stadler (France) Arthur Thieffry	(India) Savita Punia; (Australia) Jocelyn Bartram (Netherlands) Josine Koning (South Africa) Phumelela Mbande (Argentina) Belén Succi	
2023	(Netherlands) Pirmin Blaak; (Australia) Andrew Charter (Germany) Jean Danneberg (England) Ollie Payne (Belgium) Vincent Vanasch	(India) Savita Punia; (Australia) Jocelyn Bartram (United States) Kelsey Bing (Netherlands) Josine Koning (Germany) Julia Sonntag	
2024	(India) P. R. Sreejesh; (Netherlands) Pirmin Blaak (Argentina) Tomás Santiago (Spain) Luis Calzado (Germany) Jean Danneberg	(China) Ye Jiao; (Netherlands) Anne Veenendaal (Argentina) Cristina Cosentino (Belgium) Aisling D'Hooghe (Germany) Nathalie Kubalski	
2025	(Germany) Jean Danneberg; (Argentina) Tomás Santiago (England) James Mazarelo	(New Zealand) Grace O'Hanlon; (Netherlands) Anne Veenendaal (China) Liu Ping	
2026	(Spain) Luis Calzado; (Germany) Jean Danneberg (Belgium) Vincent Vanasch	(Argentina) Cristina Cosentino; (Australia) Jocelyn Bartram; (Netherlands) Anne Veenendaal	

== Wins by country ==
Country	Male Player	Female Player	Young Male Player	Young Female Player	Male Goalkeeper	Female Goalkeeper	Total
Argentina	0	10	1	8	0	0	18
Australia	8	2	5	4	0	1	20
Belgium	4	0	3	0	3	0	10
China	0	0	0	1	0	1	2
Germany	4	1	6	1	1	0	13
Great Britain	0	0	1	1	0	3	5
India	5	1	2	3	3	3	15
Ireland	0	0	0	0	2	0	2
Netherlands	5	11	2	4	1	2	24
New Zealand	0	0	0	1	0	1	2
South Korea	0	0	0	1	0	0	1
Spain	1	0	1	0	0	0	2
Pakistan	0	0	1	0	0	0	1
