= Field hockey at the 2012 Summer Olympics – Women's tournament =

Women's field hockey at the 2012 Summer Olympics

Tournament details
- Host country: United Kingdom
- City: London
- Dates: 29 July – 10 August
- Teams: 12
- Venue: Riverbank Arena

Final positions
- Champions: Netherlands (3rd title)
- Runner-up: Argentina
- Third place: Great Britain

Tournament statistics
- Matches played: 38
- Goals scored: 118 (3.11 per match)
- Top scorer(s): (United Kingdom) Crista Cullen (United Kingdom) Alex Danson (5 goals)

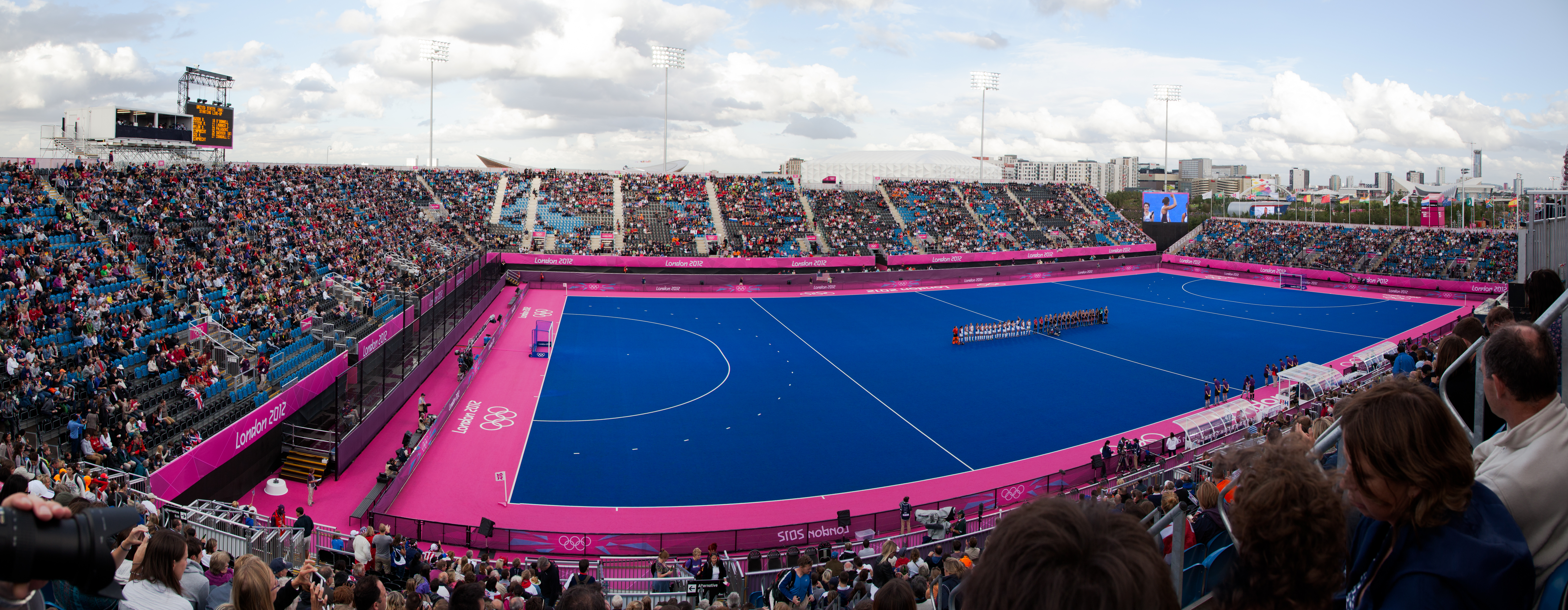
The stadium before the USA vs New Zealand game.

The women's field hockey tournament at the 2012 Summer Olympics was the 9th edition of the field hockey event for women at the Summer Olympic Games. It was held over a thirteen-day period beginning on 29 July, and culminating with the medal finals on 10 August. All games were played at the Riverbank Arena within the Olympic Park in London, United Kingdom.

Defending champions the Netherlands won the gold medal for the third time after defeating Argentina 2–0 in the final. Great Britain won the bronze medal by defeating New Zealand 3–1.

== Competition format ==
The twelve teams in the tournament were divided into two pools of six, with each team initially playing round-robin games within their pool. Following the completion of the round-robin, the top two teams from each pool advanced to the semi-finals. All other teams played classification matches to determine the final tournament rankings. The two semi-final winners met for the gold medal match, while the semi-final losers played in the bronze medal match.

== Qualification ==
Each of the continental champions from five federations and the hosts Britain received an automatic berth. The European, Asian and Oceanian federations received one extra quota based upon the FIH World Rankings at the completion of the 2010 World Cup. In addition to the three teams qualifying through the Olympic Qualifying Tournaments, the following twelve teams, shown with final pre-tournament rankings, competed in this tournament.

Dates	Event	Location	Quotas	Qualifier(s)
Host nation			1	Great Britain (4)
13–24 November 2010	2010 Asian Games	Guangzhou, China	2	China (5); South Korea (8)
20–27 August 2011	2011 EuroHockey Championship	Mönchengladbach, Germany	2	Netherlands (1); Germany (3)
2–11 September 2011	2011 African Olympic Qualifier	Bulawayo, Zimbabwe	0	—^{1}
6–9 October 2011	2011 Women's Oceania Cup	Hobart, Australia	2	New Zealand (6); Australia (7)
14–30 October 2011	2011 Pan American Games	Guadalajara, Mexico	1	United States (10)
18–25 February 2012	Olympic Qualification Tournament 1	New Delhi, India	1	South Africa (12)
17–25 March 2012	Olympic Qualification Tournament 2	Kontich, Belgium	1	Belgium (16)
25 April – 5 May 2012	Olympic Qualification Tournament 3	Kakamigahara, Japan	1	Japan (9)
Invitational			1	Argentina^{1} (2)
Total			12	

^1 – South Africa won the African qualifier tournament but gave up their automatic berth on the premise that they should play a qualifier as they deemed the African tournament as sub-standard. Eventually they won the Qualification Tournament 1. Instead, Argentina was invited as the highest ranked team not already qualified after the conclusion of the continental championships. Argentina ended up being the runners-up.

== Umpires ==
The FIH announced the list of umpires on 3 January 2012:

- Claire Adenot (FRA)
- Julie Ashton-Lucy (AUS)
- Stella Bartlema (NED)
- Frances Block (GBR)
- Carolina de la Fuente (ARG)
- Elena Eskina (RUS)
- Amy Hassick (USA)
- Kelly Hudson (NZL)
- Soledad Iparraguirre (ARG)
- Michelle Joubert (RSA)
- Kang Hyun-young (KOR)
- Carol Metchette (IRL)
- Miao Lin (CHN)
- Irene Presenqui (ARG)
- Lisa Roach (AUS)
- Chieko Soma (JPN)
- Wendy Stewart (CAN)

== Results ==
All times are British Summer Time (UTC+01:00)''

=== First round ===
Rules for classification: 1) points; 2) goal difference; 3) goals scored; 4) head-to-head result.

==== Pool A ====
Pos	Team	Pld	W	D	L	GF	GA	GD	Pts	Qualification
1	Netherlands	5	5	0	0	12	5	+7	15	Semi-finals
2	Great Britain (H)	5	3	0	2	14	7	+7	9	Semi-finals
3	China	5	2	1	2	6	3	+3	7	
4	South Korea	5	2	0	3	9	13	−4	6	
5	Japan	5	1	1	3	4	9	−5	4	
6	Belgium	5	0	2	3	2	10	−8	2	

Source: FIH
Rules for classification: 1) Points; 2) Matches won; 3) Goal difference; 4) Goals for; 5) Head-to-head result.
(H) Hosts

29 July 2012
10:45

Netherlands	3–0	Belgium
Lammers 33', 42' van Maasakker 60'	Report

Umpires:
Claire Adenot (FRA)
Michelle Joubert (RSA)

29 July 2012
13:45

China	4–0	South Korea
Ma Yibo 26', 67'; Zhao Yudiao 51'; Li Hongxia 54'	Report

Umpires:
Frances Block (GBR)
Julie Ashton-Lucy (AUS)

29 July 2012
19:00

Great Britain	4–0	Japan
Danson 7', 28'; Thomas 23'; Walton 26'	Report

Umpires:
Kelly Hudson (NZL)
Soledad Iparraguirre (ARG)

31 July 2012
08:30

Netherlands	3–2	Japan
Lammers 4', 43'; Hoog 30'	Report	Komazawa 46'; Mitsuhashi 53'

Umpires:
Kang Hyun-young (KOR)
Irene Presenqui (ARG)

31 July 2012
13:45

Belgium	0–0	China
	Report

Umpires:
Kelly Hudson (NZL)
Carolina de la Fuente (ARG)

31 July 2012
16:00

Great Britain	5–3	South Korea
White 6'; Cullen 25'; Danson 38'; Twigg 61'; Rogers 62'	Report	Kim Da-rae 18'; Han Hye-lyoung 52'; Park Mi-hyun 57'

Umpires:
Stella Bartlema (NED)
Lisa Roach (AUS)

2 August 2012
08:30

South Korea	1–0	Japan
Cheon Seul-ki 42'	Report

Umpires:
Miao Lin (CHN)
Frances Block (GBR)

2 August 2012
13:45

China	0–1	Netherlands
	Report	Goderie 10'

Umpires:
Michelle Joubert (RSA)
Chieko Soma (JPN)

2 August 2012
19:00

Belgium	0–3	Great Britain
	Report	Ball 32'; Bartlett 39'; Cullen 68'

Umpires:
Amy Hassick (USA)
Irene Presenqui (ARG)

4 August 2012
10:45

Netherlands	3–2	South Korea
Welten 10'; Hoog 14'; Dirkse van den Heuvel 36'	Report	Cheon Seul-ki 5', 65'

Umpires:
Irene Presenqui (ARG)
Claire Adenot (FRA)

4 August 2012
13:45

Japan	1–1	Belgium
Yamamoto 58'	Report	Boon 34'

Umpires:
Stella Bartlema (NED)
Wendy Stewart (CAN)

4 August 2012
16:00

China	2–1	Great Britain
Fu Baorong 41'; Zhao Yudiao 47'	Report	Cullen 69'

Umpires:
Soledad Iparraguirre (ARG)
Carol Metchette (IRL)

6 August 2012
13:45

Japan	1–0	China
Komazawa 54'	Report

Umpires:
Elena Eskina (RUS)
Kelly Hudson (NZL)

6 August 2012
16:00

South Korea	3–1	Belgium
Kim Jong-eun 8', 70'; Lee Seon-ok 24'	Report	Coppey 37'

Umpires:
Julie Ashton-Lucy (AUS)
Miao Lin (CHN)

6 August 2012
19:00

Great Britain	1–2	Netherlands
Cullen 29'	Report	van As 43' van Male 52'

Umpires:
Carolina de la Fuente (ARG)
Chieko Soma (JPN)

==== Pool B ====
Pos	Team	Pld	W	D	L	GF	GA	GD	Pts	Qualification
1	Argentina	5	3	1	1	12	4	+8	10	Semi-finals
2	New Zealand	5	3	1	1	9	5	+4	10	Semi-finals
3	Australia	5	3	1	1	5	2	+3	10	
4	Germany	5	2	1	2	6	7	−1	7	
5	South Africa	5	1	0	4	9	14	−5	3	
6	United States	5	1	0	4	4	13	−9	3	

Source: FIH
Rules for classification: 1) Points; 2) Matches won; 3) Goal difference; 4) Goals for; 5) Head-to-head result.

29 July 2012
08:30

New Zealand	1–0	Australia
Finlayson 3'	Report

Umpires:
Elena Eskina (RUS)
Carolina de la Fuente (ARG)

29 July 2012
16:00

Argentina	7–1	South Africa
Aymar 8', 29'; J. Sruoga 20'; Cavallero 25'; Rebecchi 31'; Barrionuevo 62'; D'Elía 68'	Report	Chamberlain 23'

Umpires:
Miao Lin (CHN)
Lisa Roach (AUS)

29 July 2012
21:15

Germany	2–1	United States
Rinne 8'; Hahn 21'	Report	Crandall 56'

Umpires:
Carol Metchette (IRL)
Wendy Stewart (CAN)

31 July 2012
10:45

South Africa	1–4	New Zealand
Coetzee 52'	Report	C. Harrison 2'; Eshuis 22'; Sharland 29', 61'

Umpires:
Chieko Soma (JPN)
Amy Hassick (USA)

31 July 2012
19:00

Argentina	0–1	United States
	Report	Taylor 28'

Umpires:
Claire Adenot (FRA)
Julie Ashton-Lucy (AUS)

31 July 2012
21:15

Germany	1–3	Australia
Otte 9'	Report	Munro 20'; Flanagan 46'; Boyce 53'

Umpires:
Frances Block (GBR)
Michelle Joubert (RSA)

2 August 2012
10:45

Australia	1–0	United States
Flanagan 33'	Report

Umpires:
Stella Bartlema (NED)
Soledad Iparraguirre (ARG)

2 August 2012
16:00

South Africa	0–2	Germany
	Report	Mavers 25'; Rinne 44'

Umpires:
Elena Eskina (RUS)
Kang Hyun-young (KOR)

2 August 2012
21:15

New Zealand	1–2	Argentina
C. Harrison 62'	Report	Rebecchi 3', 45'

Umpires:
Lisa Roach (AUS)
Carol Metchette (IRL)

4 August 2012
08:30

Australia	1–0	South Africa
Close 8'	Report

Umpires:
Miao Lin (CHN)
Amy Hassick (USA)

4 August 2012
19:00

United States	2–3	New Zealand
O'Donnell 16'; Laubach 34'	Report	Sharland 3'; Flynn 19'; Eshuis 64'

Umpires:
Carolina de la Fuente (ARG)
Kang Hyun-young (KOR)

4 August 2012
21:15

Germany	1–3	Argentina
Hasselmann 67'	Report	Maccari 13'; Aymar 28'; Sánchez Moccia 67'

Umpires:
Julie Ashton-Lucy (AUS)
Chieko Soma (JPN)

6 August 2012
08:30

New Zealand	0–0	Germany
	Report

Umpires:
Soledad Iparraguirre (ARG)
Lisa Roach (AUS)

6 August 2012
10:45

United States	0–7	South Africa
	Report	Bright 14', 44'; George 20'; Wilson 25'; Coetzee 33', 62'; Chamberlain 54'

Umpires:
Frances Block (GBR)
Claire Adenot (FRA)

6 August 2012
21:15

Argentina	0–0	Australia
	Report

Umpires:
Kang Hyun-young (KOR)
Michelle Joubert (RSA)

=== Fifth to twelfth place classification ===
==== Eleventh and twelfth place ====
10 August 2012
08:30

Belgium	2–1	United States
Gerniers 20'; Valcke 52'	Report	Selenski 6'

Umpires:
Elena Eskina (RUS)
Irene Presenqui (ARG)

==== Ninth and tenth place ====
8 August 2012
08:30

Japan	2–1 (a.e.t.)	South Africa
Murakami 63', 80'	Report	Deetlefs 27'

Umpires:
Stella Bartlema (NED)
Amy Hassick (USA)

==== Seventh and eighth place ====
8 August 2012
11:30

South Korea	1–4	Germany
Cheon Seul-ki 8'	Report	Hahn 6', 16'; Rinne 55'; Mavers 70'

Umpires:
Carolina de la Fuente (ARG)
Claire Adenot (FRA)

==== Fifth and sixth place ====
10 August 2012
11:30

China	0–2	Australia
	Report	Schulz 41'; Close 60'

Umpires:
Frances Block (GBR)
Michelle Joubert (RSA)

=== Medal round ===
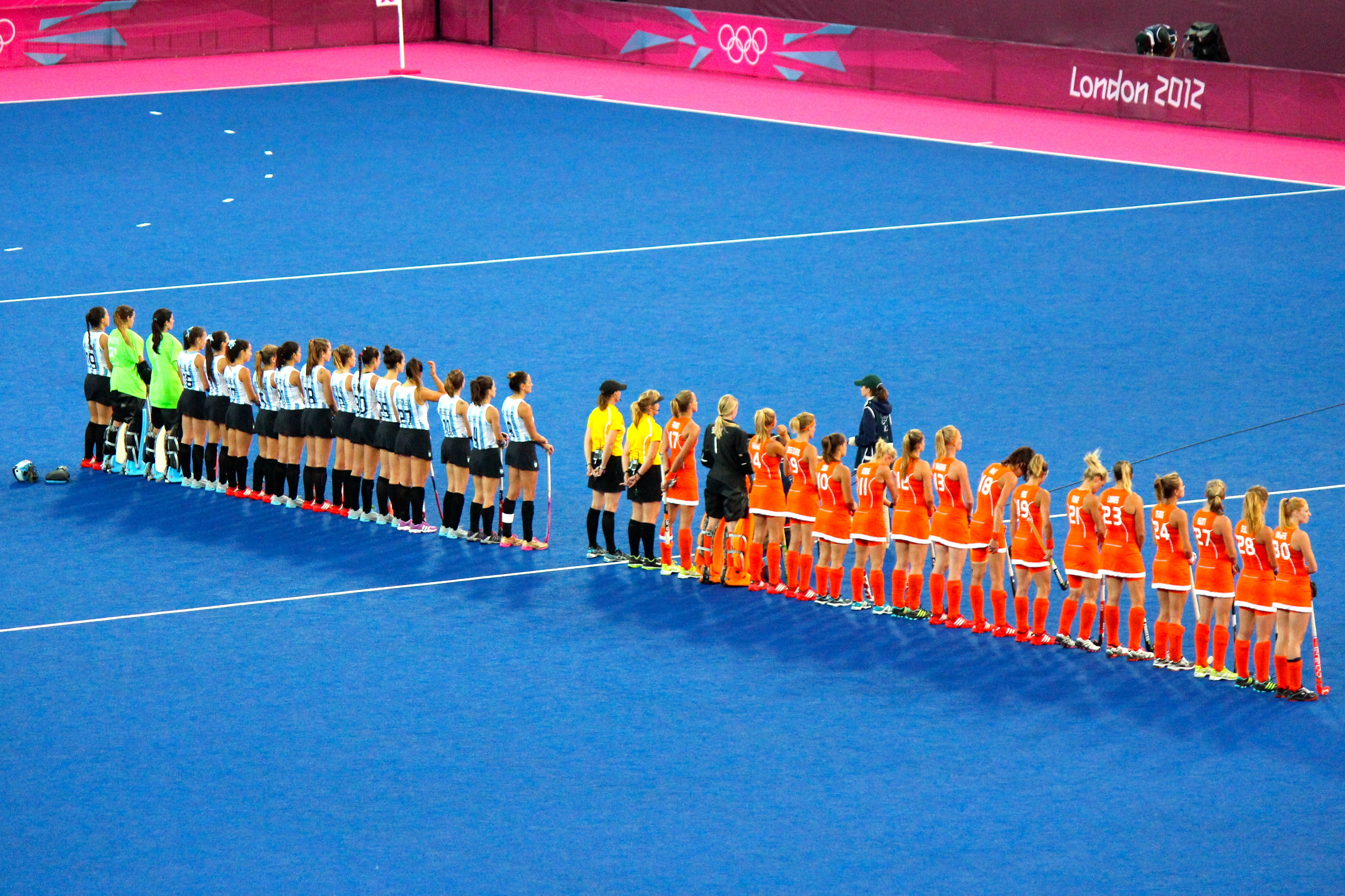
The final: Argentina and Netherlands

Semi-finals
8 August 2012
Netherlands (p.s.o.)	2 (3)
New Zealand	2 (1)
8 August 2012
Argentina	2
Great Britain	1

Gold medal match
10 August 2012
Netherlands	2
Argentina	0
Bronze medal match
10 August 2012
New Zealand	1
Great Britain	3

==== Semifinals ====
8 August 2012
15:30

Netherlands	2–2 (a.e.t.)	New Zealand
Paumen 32', 53'	Report	Sharland 7'; Forgesson 49'
Penalties
Van As (penalty shoot-out scored); Paumen (penalty shoot-out missed); De Goede (penalty shoot-out scored); Van Geffen (penalty shoot-out missed); Hoog (penalty shoot-out scored)	3–1	(penalty shoot-out missed) Sharland; (penalty shoot-out scored) Michelsen; (penalty shoot-out missed) Flynn; (penalty shoot-out missed) Punt

Umpires:
Soledad Iparraguirre (ARG)
Julie Ashton-Lucy (AUS)

8 August 2012
20:00

Argentina	2–1	Great Britain
Barrionuevo 6'; Rebecchi 31'	Report	Danson 65'

Umpires:
Lisa Roach (AUS)
Carol Metchette (IRL)

==== Bronze medal match ====
10 August 2012
15:30

New Zealand	1–3	Great Britain (bronze)
Michelsen 68'	Report	Danson 45'; Cullen 59'; Thomas 63'

Umpires:
Soledad Iparraguirre (ARG)
Chieko Soma (JPN)

==== Gold medal match ====
10 August 2012
20:00

(gold) Netherlands	2–0	Argentina (silver)
Dirkse van den Heuvel 45'; Paumen 54'	Report 1 Report 2

Umpires:
Julie Ashton-Lucy (AUS)
Lisa Roach (AUS)

Team details

Netherlands
Argentina

GK	1	Joyce Sombroek
DF	13	Caia van Maasakker
DF	21	Sophie Polkamp
DF	28	Merel de Blaeij
MF	9	Carlien van den Heuvel
MF	17	Maartje Paumen (c)
MF	19	Ellen Hoog
MF	24	Eva de Goede
FW	10	Kelly Jonker
FW	18	Naomi van As
FW	23	Kim Lammers
Substitutions:
FW	4	Kitty van Male		(substituted on) 9'
FW	11	Maartje Goderie	30'	(substituted on) 9'
FW	12	Lidewij Welten		(substituted on) 9'
	27	Marilyn Agliotti		(substituted on) 12'
DF	30	Margot van Geffen		(substituted on) 9'
Manager:
(Argentina) Maximiliano Caldas

GK	1	Florencia Mutio
DF	5	Macarena Rodríguez
DF	21	Mariela Scarone
DF	26	Silvina D'Elía	59'
DF	27	Noel Barrionuevo
MF	4	Rosario Luchetti
MF	18	Daniela Sruoga
MF	8	Luciana Aymar (c)
FW	12	Delfina Merino
MF	30	Josefina Sruoga
FW	11	Carla Rebecchi
Substitutions:
FW	7	Martina Cavallero		(substituted on) 11'
MF	16	Florencia Habif		(substituted on) 6'
MF	17	Rocío Sánchez Moccia		(substituted on) 9'
FW	19	María Paz Hernández		(substituted on) 9'
Manager:
(Argentina) Carlos Retegui

== Statistics ==
=== Final ranking ===
As per statistical convention in field hockey, matches decided in extra time are counted as wins and losses, while matches decided by penalty shoot-outs are counted as draws.

Pos	Team	Pld	W	D	L	GF	GA	GD	Pts	Final result
1st place, gold medalist(s)	Netherlands	7	6	1	0	16	7	+9	19	Gold Medal
2nd place, silver medalist(s)	Argentina	7	4	1	2	14	7	+7	13	Silver Medal
3rd place, bronze medalist(s)	Great Britain	7	4	0	3	18	10	+8	12	Bronze Medal
4	New Zealand	7	3	2	2	12	10	+2	11	Fourth place
5	Australia	6	4	1	1	7	2	+5	13	Eliminated in group stage
6	China	6	2	1	3	6	5	+1	7	Eliminated in group stage
7	Germany	6	3	1	2	10	8	+2	10	Eliminated in group stage
8	South Korea	6	2	0	4	10	17	−7	6	Eliminated in group stage
9	Japan	6	2	1	3	6	10	−4	7	Eliminated in group stage
10	South Africa	6	1	0	5	10	16	−6	3	Eliminated in group stage
11	Belgium	6	1	2	3	4	11	−7	5	Eliminated in group stage
12	United States	6	1	0	5	5	15	−10	3	Eliminated in group stage

Source: FIH

=== Goalscorers ===
There were 118 goals scored in 38 matches, for an average of 3.11 goals per match.

5 goals

- (United Kingdom) Crista Cullen
- (United Kingdom) Alexandra Danson

4 goals

- (Argentina) Carla Rebecchi
- (South Korea) Cheon Seul-Ki
- (Netherlands) Kim Lammers
- (New Zealand) Kayla Sharland

3 goals

- (Argentina) Luciana Aymar
- (Germany) Lisa Hahn
- (Germany) Fanny Rinne
- (Netherlands) Maartje Paumen
- (South Africa) Pietie Coetzee

2 goals

- (Argentina) Noel Barrionuevo
- (Australia) Jade Close
- (Australia) Anna Flanagan
- (China) Ma Yibo
- (China) Zhao Yudiao
- (United Kingdom) Sarah Thomas
- (Germany) Marie Mävers
- (Japan) Rika Komazawa
- (Japan) Ai Murakami
- (South Korea) Kim Jong-Eun
- (Netherlands) Carlien Dirkse van den Heuvel
- (Netherlands) Ellen Hoog
- (New Zealand) Clarissa Eshuis
- (New Zealand) Charlotte Harrison
- (South Africa) Tarryn Bright
- (South Africa) Dirkie Chamberlain

1 goal

- (Argentina) Martina Cavallero
- (Argentina) Silvina D'Elía
- (Argentina) Sofía Maccari
- (Argentina) Rocío Sánchez Moccia
- (Argentina) Josefina Sruoga
- (Australia) Fiona Boyce
- (Australia) Hope Munro
- (Australia) Jodie Schulz
- (Belgium) Jill Boon
- (Belgium) Erica Coppey
- (Belgium) Alix Gerniers
- (Belgium) Gaëlle Valcke
- (China) Fu Baorong
- (China) Li Hongxia
- (United Kingdom) Ashleigh Ball
- (United Kingdom) Laura Bartlett
- (United Kingdom) Chloe Rogers
- (United Kingdom) Georgina Twigg
- (United Kingdom) Sally Walton
- (United Kingdom) Nicola White
- (Germany) Nina Hasselmann
- (Germany) Katharina Otte
- (Japan) Aki Mitsuhashi
- (Japan) Yukari Yamamoto
- (South Korea) Han Hye-Lyoung
- (South Korea) Kim Da-Rae
- (South Korea) Lee Seon-Ok
- (South Korea) Park Mi-Hyun
- (Netherlands) Maartje Goderie
- (Netherlands) Naomi van As
- (Netherlands) Caia van Maasakker
- (Netherlands) Kitty van Male
- (Netherlands) Lidewij Welten
- (New Zealand) Cathryn Finlayson
- (New Zealand) Gemma Flynn
- (New Zealand) Krystal Forgesson
- (New Zealand) Stacey Michelsen
- (South Africa) Lisa-Marie Deetlefs
- (South Africa) Lesle-Ann George
- (South Africa) Jennifer Wilson
- (United States) Lauren Crandall
- (United States) Claire Laubach
- (United States) Kathleen O'Donnell
- (United States) Paige Selenski
- (United States) Shannon Taylor

Source: FIH
