= 2009 Women's Hockey Asia Cup =

International field hockey tournament

Tournament details
- Host country: Thailand
- City: Bangkok
- Dates: 29 October – 8 November
- Teams: 11
- Venue: Bangkok Hockey Stadium

Final positions
- Champions: China (2nd title)
- Runner-up: India
- Third place: South Korea

Tournament statistics
- Matches played: 35
- Goals scored: 237 (6.77 per match)
- Top scorer(s): (Japan) Keiko Miura (South Korea) Kim Jong-Eun (South Korea) Cheon Seul-Ki (12 goals)
- Best player: (India) Subhadra Pradhan

The 2009 Women's Hockey Asia Cup was the seventh edition of the women's field hockey tournament. It was held in Bangkok from 29 October to 8 November 2009.

China won the tournament for the second time, defeating India 5–3 in the final. South Korea finished in third place after defeating Japan 4–3 in the third place playoff.

The tournament served as a qualifier for the 2010 FIH World Cup, with the top two teams qualifying.

== Competition format ==
The teams were divided into Pool A and Pool B. The competition comprised a single round-robin format in each pool, with each team playing each other once. At the conclusion of the pool stage, the top two teams advanced to the medal round, while the remaining teams played off for classifications.

== Teams ==
The following teams participated in the tournament:

- China
- Chinese Taipei
- Hong Kong
- India
- Japan (defending champions)
- Kazakhstan
- Malaysia
- Singapore
- South Korea
- Sri Lanka
- Thailand

== Officials ==
The following umpires were appointed by the Asian Hockey Federation and the FIH to officiate the tournament:

- Miskarmalia Ariffin (MAS)
- Thanita Chungmanichot (THA)
- Elena Eskina (RUS)
- Carolina de la Fuente (ARG)
- Nor Piza Hassan (MAS)
- Amy Hassick (USA)
- Lim Mi-Sook (KOR)
- Anupama Puchimanda (IND)
- Annie Thomas (MAS)
- Liu Xiaoying (CHN)
- Yumiko Yasuoka (JPN)
- Kitty Yau (HKG)

== Preliminary round ==
All times are local (ICT).

=== Pool A ===
Pos	Team	Pld	W	D	L	GF	GA	GD	Pts	Qualification
1	China	4	3	1	0	27	1	+26	10	Advanced to Semi-Finals
2	India	4	2	2	0	30	2	+28	8	Advanced to Semi-Finals
3	Malaysia	4	2	1	1	8	5	+3	7	
4	Singapore	4	1	0	3	1	30	−29	3	
5	Thailand (H)	4	0	0	4	0	28	−28	0	

Source: FIH
Rules for classification: 1) points; 2) goal difference; 3) goals scored; 4) head-to-head result.
(H) Hosts

29 October 2009
16:30

Thailand	0–3	Malaysia
	Report	Norfaraha 7'; Juliani 24'; Hashim 53'

Umpires:
Anupama Puchimanda (IND)
Liu Xiaoying (CHN)

29 October 2009
18:30

India	13–0	Singapore
Saba 2', 42'; Surinder 4', 48'; Rani 19', 41'; Mamta 23', 67'; Deepika 35', 59'; Jasjeet 39', 53', 59'	Report

Umpires:
Yumiko Yasuoka (JPN)
Elena Eskina (RUS)

30 October 2009
16:00

Singapore	0–13	China
	Report	Li S. 5', 41'; Ren 7', 8'; Gao 11', 58'; Ma W. 20', 32'; Song 38', 65'; Li H. 54'; Xing 60', 69'

Umpires:
Nor Piza Hassan (RUS)
Lim Mi-Sook (KOR)

30 October 2009
16:30

India	15–0	Thailand
Ritu 11'; Mamta 15', 33', 45'; Rani 18', 28', 38', 41', 58', 69'; Saba 32', 47', 60'; Monika 52'; Surinder 64'	Report

Umpires:
Carolina de la Fuente (ARG)
Kitty Yau (HKG)

1 November 2009
14:30

China	4–0	Malaysia
Ma Y. 21'; Zhao 44'; Li H. 47'; De 58'	Report

Umpires:
Yumiko Yasuoka (JPN)
Carolina de la Fuente (ARG)

1 November 2009
18:30

Singapore	1–0	Thailand
Nursabrina 4'	Report

Umpires:
Liu Xiaoying (CHN)
Nor Piza Hassan (MAS)

3 November 2009
14:30

China	1–1	India
Liao 18'	Report	Saba 45'

Umpires:
Amy Hassick (USA)
Lim Mi-Sook (KOR)

3 November 2009
18:30

Malaysia	4–0	Singapore
Siti R. 13'; Nuraini 15'; Siti O. 50'; Chitra 64'	Report

Umpires:
Anupama Puchimanda (IND)
Yumiko Yasuoka (JPN)

4 November 2009
16:30

Thailand	0–9	China
	Report	Ma Y. 2', 14', 25', 54'; Li H. 8'; Song 34', 52'; Fu 60'; Zhao 66'

Umpires:
Lim Mi-Sook (KOR)
Kitty Yau (HKG)

4 November 2009
18:30

Malaysia	1–1	India
Juliani 4'	Report	Binita 27'

Umpires:
Elena Eskina (RUS)
Amy Hassick (USA)

=== Pool B ===
Pos	Team	Pld	W	D	L	GF	GA	GD	Pts	Qualification
1	South Korea	5	4	1	0	59	2	+57	13	Advanced to Semi-Finals
2	Japan	5	4	1	0	45	2	+43	13	Advanced to Semi-Finals
3	Kazakhstan	5	3	0	2	13	29	−16	9	
4	Hong Kong	5	1	1	3	5	20	−15	4	
5	Chinese Taipei	5	1	1	3	7	28	−21	4	
6	Sri Lanka	5	0	0	5	1	49	−48	0	

Source: FIH
Rules for classification: 1) points; 2) goal difference; 3) goals scored; 4) head-to-head result.

29 October 2009
14:00

Japan	10–0	Kazakhstan
Miura 3', 6'; Nakashima 18', 23', 52', 59'; Arai 38', 47'; Murakami 61'; Komazawa 68'	Report

Umpires:
Nor Piza Hassan (MAS)
Amy Hassick (USA)

29 October 2009
16:00

South Korea	17–0	Sri Lanka
Cheon S. 2', 5', 10', 19', 34', 51', 52', 60', 69'; Kim O. 8'; Park M. 13', 14', 39'; Kim J. 26', 43'; Lee So. 55'; Yoo J. 64'	Report

Umpires:
Carolina de la Fuente (ARG)
Annie Thomas (MAS)

30 October 2009
09:00

Hong Kong	0–0	Chinese Taipei
	Report

Umpires:
Miskarmalia Ariffin (MAS)
Thanita Chungmanichot (THA)

31 October 2009
14:00

Sri Lanka	0–20	Japan
	Report	Sato 1'; Murakami 5'; Imura 10', 12', 27', 49'; Nagayama 11'; Iwao 16', 22'; Miura 25', 33', 41', 54', 61'; Arai 43'; Komazawa 44', 46', 53', 67'; Ozawa 70+'

Umpires:
Elena Eskina (RUS)
Annie Thomas (MAS)

31 October 2009
14:30

South Korea	10–0	Hong Kong
Cheon S. 12', 26'; Han 14'; Kim J. 23', 25'; Lee So. 33'; Kim D. 44'; Kim E. 51'; Park M. 58'; Eum 65'	Report

Umpires:
Amy Hassick (USA)
Thanita Chungmanichot (THA)

31 October 2009
18:30

Chinese Taipei	2–5	Kazakhstan
Lu 38'; Sung 40'	Report	Mangalieva 14', 29', 62'; Domashneva 45'; Baissarina 50'

Umpires:
Kitty Yau (HKG)
Miskarmalia Ariffin (MAS)

1 November 2009
14:00

Hong Kong	3–0	Sri Lanka
Helen 32', 55'; Emmett 63'	Report

Umpires:
Lim Mi-Sook (KOR)
Elena Eskina (RUS)

1 November 2009
16:00

Kazakhstan	0–15	South Korea
	Report	Han 2'; Kim J. 6', 8', 17', 19', 40', 60'; Park M. 9', 14'; Kim D. 22', 28'; Kim B. 35'; Kim E. 56'; Kim Y. 61'; Tak 66'

Umpires:
Amy Hassick (USA)
Anupama Puchimanda (IND)

1 November 2009
14:00

Japan	7–0	Chinese Taipei
Sato 13'; Miura 17', 45'; Arai 26'; Komazawa 37'; Nagayama 50'; Ozawa 64'	Report

Umpires:
Kitty Yau (HKG)
Annie Thomas (MAS)

3 November 2009
14:00

Kazakhstan	4–2	Hong Kong
Belynova 16', 65'; Mangalieva 43'; Domashneva 58'	Report	Yi 35+'; Sawyer 39'

Umpires:
Miskarmalia Ariffin (MAS)
Nor Piza Hassan (MAS)

3 November 2009
16:00

Sri Lanka	1–5	Chinese Taipei
Perera 11'	Report	Yang 24', 40'; Chen C. 31'; Chen H. 53', 56'

Umpires:
hanita Chungmanichot (THA)
Kitty Yau (HKG)

3 November 2009
16:30

South Korea	2–2	Japan
Eum 10'; Kim D. 68'	Report	Sato 29'; Murakami 53'

Umpires:
Carolina de la Fuente (ARG)
Liu Xiaoying (CHN)

4 November 2009
14:00

Kazakhstan	4–0	Sri Lanka
Mangalieva 7', 15', 34', 49'	Report

Umpires:
Miskarmalia Ariffin (MAS)
Liu Xiaoying (CHN)

4 November 2009
14:30

Chinese Taipei	0–15	South Korea
	Report	Han 4', 13', 31'; Lee So. 9', 19', 64'; Park M. 24', 38'; Kim E. 33'; Kim Y. 40'; Kim J. 42', 44'; Cheon S. 52'; Kim D. 57'; Tak 65'

Umpires:
Anupama Puchimanda (IND)
Thanita Chungmanichot (THA)

4 November 2009
16:00

Japan	6–0	Hong Kong
Murakami 12', 55'; Miura 19', 21', 45'; Nakagawa 42'	Report

Umpires:
Annie Thomas (MAS)
Carolina de la Fuente (ARG)

== Classification round ==
=== Ninth to eleventh place classification ===
Crossover
7 November 2009
Thailand	3
Sri Lanka	1

Ninth Place
8 November 2009
Chinese Taipei	2
Thailand	1

==== Crossover ====
7 November 2009
15:00

Thailand	3–1	Sri Lanka
Ritngam 7'; Lewwrungroj 28', 65'	Report	Perera 46'

Umpires:
Anupama Puchimanda (IND)
Nor Piza Hassan (MAS)

==== Ninth and tenth place ====
8 November 2009
15:00

Chinese Taipei	2–1	Thailand
Lu 25'; Chia 32'	Report	Lewwrungroj 2'

Umpires:
Kitty Yau (HKG)
Lim Mi-Sook (KOR)

=== Fifth to eighth place classification ===
Crossover
6 November 2009
Malaysia	5
Hong Kong	0
6 November 2009
Kazakhstan	2
Singapore	1

Fifth Place
7 November 2009
Malaysia	2
Kazakhstan	1
Seventh Place
7 November 2009
Hong Kong	2
Singapore	0

==== Crossover ====
6 November 2009
13:00

Malaysia	5–0	Hong Kong
Norbaini 3'; Norfaraha 10'; Juliani 12'; Nadia 18'; Siti 61'	Report

Umpires:
Thanita Chungmanichot (THA)
Anupama Puchimanda (IND)

6 November 2009
15:30

Kazakhstan	2–1	Singapore
Mangalieva 58', 60'	Report	Nursbrina 19'

Umpires:
Kitty Yau (HKG)
Lim Mi-Sook (KOR)

==== Seventh and eighth place ====
7 November 2009
15:30

Hong Kong	2–0	Singapore
Helen 34'; Ozorio 63'	Report

Umpires:
Lim Mi-Sook (KOR)
Thanita Chungmanichot (THA)

==== Fifth and sixth place ====
7 November 2009
18:00

Malaysia	2–1	Kazakhstan
Siti 17', 50'	Report	Mangalieva 6'

Umpires:
Miskarmalia Ariffin (SGP)
Amy Hassick (USA)

== Medal round ==
Semi-Finals
6 November 2009
China	1
Japan	0
6 November 2009
South Korea	2
India	3

Final
8 November 2009
China	5
India	3
Third Place
8 November 2009
Japan	3
South Korea	4

=== Semi-finals ===
6 November 2009
15:00

China	1–0	Japan
Zhao 33'	Report

Umpires:
Amy Hassick (USA)
Carolina de la Fuente (ARG)

6 November 2009
17:30

South Korea	2–3	India
Kim Eun-S. 62'; Park M. 68'	Report	Jasjeet 8', 37'; Rani 55'

Umpires:
Elena Eskina (RUS)
Liu Xiaoying (CHN)

=== Third and fourth place ===
8 November 2009
15:30

Japan	3–4	South Korea
Komazawa 1'; Nakashima 24'; Ozawa 34'	Report	Han 10'; Lee So. 18', 67'; Kim B. 30'

Umpires:
Carolina de la Fuente (ARG)
Liu Xiaoying (CHN)

=== Final ===
8 November 2009
18:00

China	5–3	India
Fu 13'; Ma Y. 18', 47'; Zhao 27'; De 51'	Report	Surinder 8'; Mamta 47'; Deepika 54'

Umpires:
Yumiko Yasuoka (JPN)
Elena Eskina (RUS)

== Final standings ==
As per statistical convention in field hockey, matches decided in extra time are counted as wins and losses, while matches decided by penalty shoot-outs are counted as draws.

Pos	Team	Pld	W	D	L	GF	GA	GD	Pts	Status
1st place, gold medalist(s)	China	6	5	1	0	33	4	+29	16	Qualified for 2010 FIH World Cup
2nd place, silver medalist(s)	India	6	3	2	1	36	9	+27	11	Qualified for 2010 FIH World Cup
3rd place, bronze medalist(s)	South Korea	7	5	1	1	65	8	+57	16	FIH World Cup Qualifiers
4	Japan	7	4	1	2	48	7	+41	13	FIH World Cup Qualifiers
5	Malaysia	6	4	1	1	15	6	+9	13	FIH World Cup Qualifiers
6	Kazakhstan	7	4	0	3	16	32	−16	12	
7	Hong Kong	7	2	1	4	7	25	−18	7	
8	Singapore	6	1	0	5	2	34	−32	3	
9	Chinese Taipei	6	2	1	3	9	29	−20	7	
10	Thailand (H)	6	1	0	5	4	31	−27	3	
11	Sri Lanka	6	0	0	6	2	52	−50	0	

Source: FIH
(H) Hosts

== Goalscorers ==
There were 237 goals scored in 35 matches, for an average of 6.77 goals per match.

12 goals

- (Japan) Keiko Miura
- (South Korea) Kim Jong-Eun
- (South Korea) Cheon Seul-Ki

11 goals

- (Kazakhstan) Gulnari Mangalieva

9 goals

- (India) Rani Rampal
- (South Korea) Park Mi-Hyun

7 goals

- (China) Ma Yibo
- (Japan) Rika Komazawa
- (South Korea) Lee Soo-Kyung

6 goals

- (India) Saba Anjum
- (India) Mamta Kharab
- (South Korea) Han Hye-Lyoung

5 goals

- (India) Jasjeet Kaur Handa
- (Japan) Ai Murakami
- (Japan) Mie Nakashima
- (South Korea) Kim Da-Rae

4 goals

- (China) Song Qingling
- (China) Zhao Yudiao
- (India) Surinder Kaur
- (Japan) Mazuki Arai
- (Japan) Mika Imura
- (Malaysia) Siti Othman
- (South Korea) Kim Eun-Sil

3 goals

- (China) Li Hongxia
- (Hong Kong) Barbara Helen
- (India) Deepika Thakur
- (Japan) Misaki Ozawa
- (Japan) Masako Sato
- (Malaysia) Juliani Din
- (Thailand) Kannika Lewwrungroj

2 goals

- (China) Fu Baorong
- (China) De Jiaojiao
- (China) Gao Lihua
- (China) Xing Qian
- (China) Li Shuang
- (China) Ma Wei
- (China) Ren Ye
- (Chinese Taipei) Chen Hsiu-Chin
- (Chinese Taipei) Lu Pei-Ling
- (Chinese Taipei) Yang Wan-Wen
- (Japan) Sachimi Iwao
- (Japan) Kana Nagayama
- (Kazakhstan) Yelena Belynova
- (Kazakhstan) Vera Domashneva
- (Malaysia) Norbaini Hashim
- (Malaysia) Norfaraha Hashim
- (Singapore) Nursabrina Banuh
- (South Korea) Kim Bo-Mi
- (South Korea) Eum Mi-Young
- (South Korea) Tak Se-Hui
- (South Korea) Kim Young-Ran
- (Sri Lanka) Dinesha Ameeta Perera

1 goal

- (China) Liao Jiahui
- (Chinese Taipei) Chen Chen-Tzu
- (Chinese Taipei) Chia Jung-Chen
- (Chinese Taipei) Sung Ming-Fang
- (Hong Kong) Nicole Emmett
- (Hong Kong) Christie-Anna Ozorio
- (Hong Kong) Nicola-Jane Sawyer
- (Hong Kong) Yi Sui-Suet
- (India) Monika Bardan
- (India) Ritu Rani
- (India) Binita Toppo
- (Japan) Miyuki Nakagawa
- (Kazakhstan) Guliya Baissarina
- (Malaysia) Chitra Arumugam
- (Malaysia) Nadia Rahman
- (Malaysia) Nuraini Rashid
- (Malaysia) Siti Ruhani
- (South Korea) Yoo Jung-Mi
- (South Korea) Kim Ok-Ju
- (Thailand) Sukanya Ritngam
