= Masako Sato =

Masako Sato may refer to:

- Masako Sato (field hockey) (佐藤 雅子, born 1987), Japanese field hockey player
- Masako Sato (ice hockey) (佐藤 雅子, born 1973), Japanese ice hockey player
