= Naomi van As =

Dutch former field hockey player

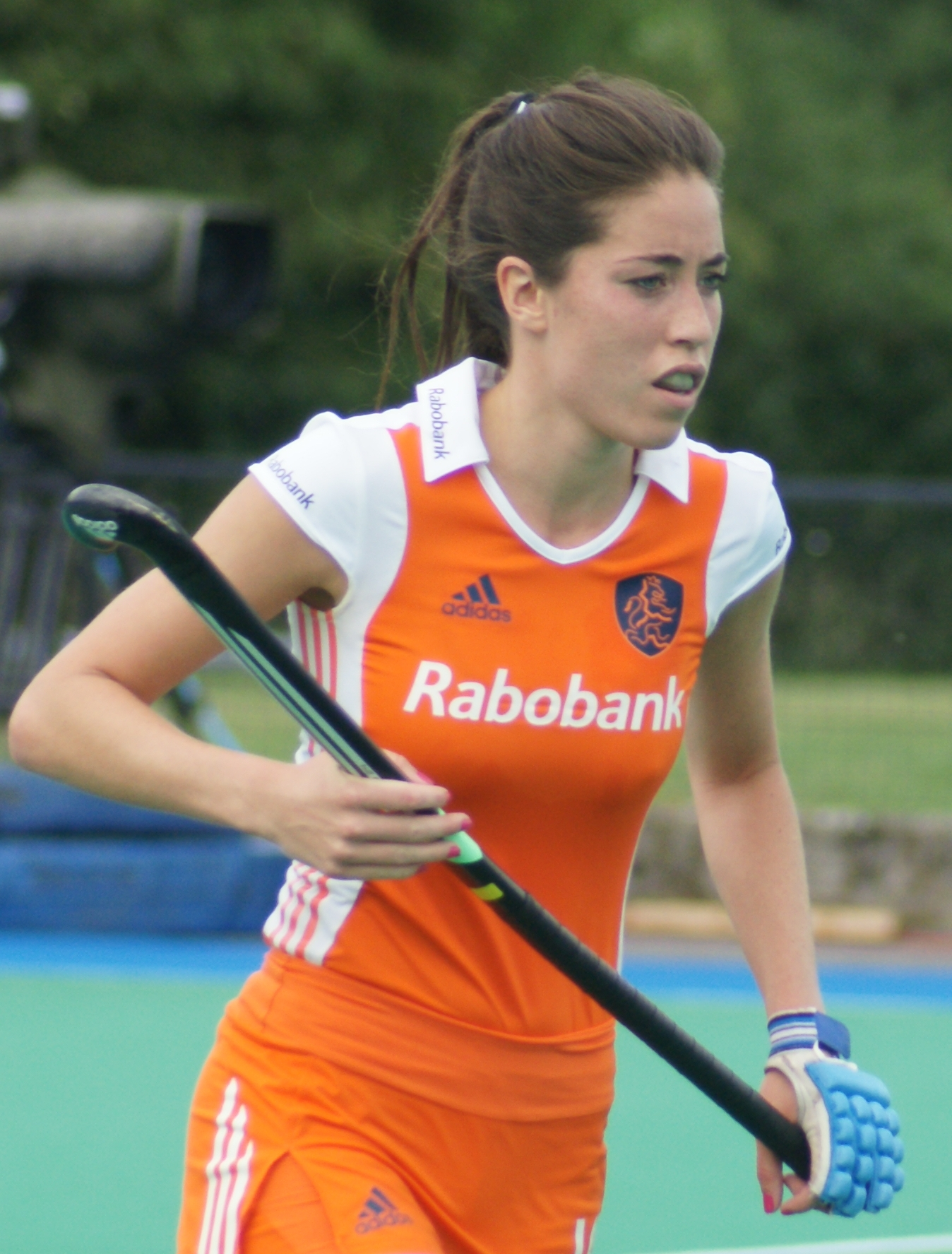

Personal information
- Born: 26 July 1983 (age 43) The Hague, Netherlands
- Height: 1.79 m (5 ft 10 in)
- Weight: 63 kg (139 lb)

Sport
- Sport: Field hockey
- Position: Midfield/Forward
Senior career
Years	Team	Caps	Goals
1999–2001 2001–2002 2002–	HDM; HCKZ; MHC Laren	-	-
National team
Years	Team	Caps	Goals
2003–2016	Netherlands	168	(35)
Medal record
Olympic Games
Gold medal – first place	2008 Beijing	Team
Gold medal – first place	2012 London	Team
Silver medal – second place	2016 Rio de Janeiro	Team
World Cup
Gold medal – first place	2006 Madrid
Gold medal – first place	2014 The Hague
Silver medal – second place	2010 Rosario
European Championship
Gold medal – first place	2005 Dublin
Gold medal – first place	2009 Amstelveen
Gold medal – first place	2011 Gladbach
Silver medal – second place	2007 Manchester
Silver medal – second place	2015 London
Champions Trophy
Gold medal – first place	2004 Rosario
Gold medal – first place	2005 Canberra
Gold medal – first place	2007 Quilmes
Silver medal – second place	2010 Nottingham
Bronze medal – third place	2006 Amstelveen
Bronze medal – third place	2008 Mönchengladbach
Bronze medal – third place	2009 Sydney
Bronze medal – third place	2012 Rosario
Bronze medal – third place	2014 Mendoza

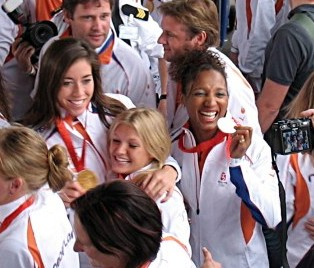
Naomi van As, left, and Deborah Gravenstijn, right

Naomi van As (born 26 July 1983) is a Dutch field hockey player who plays as a forward/midfielder for the Dutch club MHC Laren.

She made her debut for the Netherlands national team on 20 June 2003 in a game against South Africa. She was a part of the Dutch squad that became world champions at the 2006 Women's Hockey World Cup as well as won the 2007 Champions Trophy. Her family lives in South Africa.

In 2008, Van As became an Olympic gold medal winner with her national team at the 2008 Summer Olympics in Beijing, scoring the first goal in their 2–0 win over China. At the 2012 Summer Olympics, she was again part of the Dutch team that won gold. She finished her international sporting career at the 2016 Summer Olympics in Rio de Janeiro in the by shoot-outs lost final against the team of Great Britain. Van As was named FIH Player of the Year twice, both in 2009 and 2016.

In 2012, Van As was made a Knight of the Order of Orange-Nassau after she and the fellow members of her hockey team won the women's field hockey tournament at the 2012 Summer Olympics.

Since 2007, Van As has been in a long-term relationship with longtrack skater Sven Kramer, and they have a daughter (born in 2018) and a son (born in 2022).
