= Kim Young-ran (field hockey) =

South Korean field hockey player

Personal information
- Born: 1 August 1985 (age 41) Seoul, South Korea
- Height: 1.67 m (5 ft 6 in)
- Weight: 58 kg (128 lb)

Sport
- Sport: Field hockey
- Position: Defender
- Club: KT Busan
National team
Years	Team	Caps	Goals
–	South Korea	144	-
Medal record
Women's field hockey
Representing South Korea
Asian Games
Silver medal – second place	2010 Guangzhou	Team
Asia Cup
Bronze medal – third place	2009 Bangkok
Bronze medal – third place	2017 Gifu
Asian Champions Trophy
Gold medal – first place	2010 Busan
Gold medal – first place	2011 Ordos
Gold medal – first place	2018 Donghae

Kim Young-Ran (born 1 August 1985) is a South Korean field hockey player. At the 2008 and 2012 Summer Olympics she competed with the Korea women's national field hockey team in the women's tournament.
