= Vincent Vanasch =

Belgian field hockey player

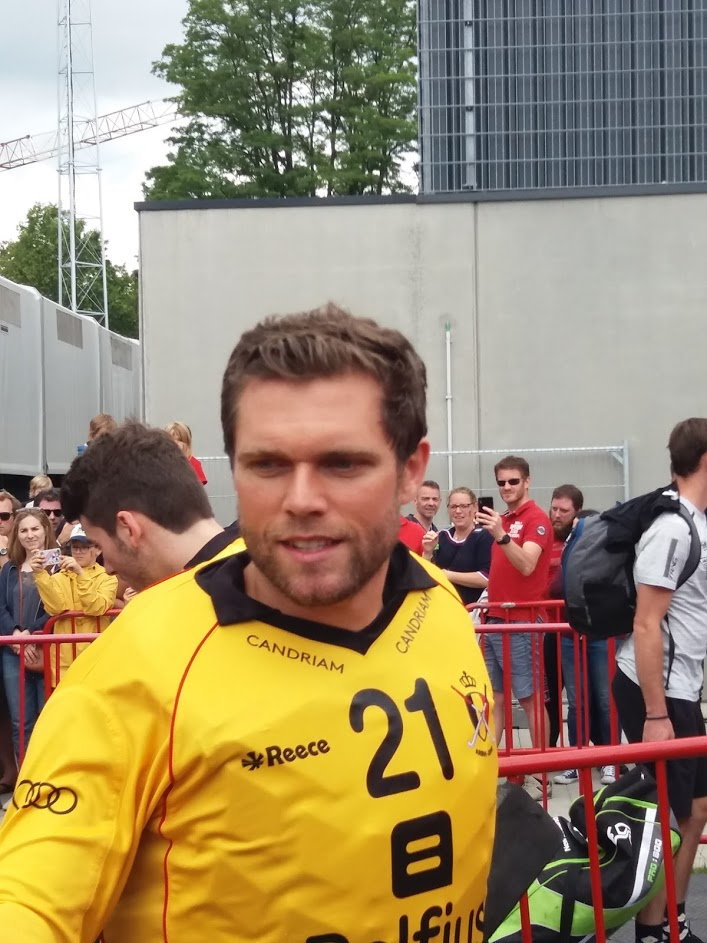

Personal information
- Born: 21 December 1987 (age 38) Evere, Belgium
- Height: 1.80 m (5 ft 11 in)
- Weight: 78 kg (172 lb)

Sport
- Sport: Field hockey
- Position: Goalkeeper
- Club: Orée; Soorma HC
Youth career
- Years: Team
- 1994–2004: White Star
Senior career
Years	Team	Caps	Goals
2004–2007	White Star	-	-
2007–2009	Pingouin	-	-
2009–2010	Leuven	-	-
2010–2014	Waterloo Ducks	-	-
2014–2016	Oranje Zwart	-	-
2016–2020	Waterloo Ducks	-	-
2020–2023	Rot-Weiss Köln	-	-
2023–present	Orée	-	-
2024-present	Soorma HC	-	-
National team
Years	Team	Caps	Goals
2007–present	Belgium	273	(0)
Medal record
Men's field hockey
Representing BEL
Olympic Games
Gold medal – first place	2020 Tokyo	Team
Silver medal – second place	2016 Rio de Janeiro	Team
World Cup
Gold medal – first place	2018 Bhubaneswar
Silver medal – second place	2023 Bhubaneswar–Rourkela
EuroHockey Championship
Gold medal – first place	2019 Antwerp
Silver medal – second place	2013 Boom
Silver medal – second place	2017 Amstelveen
Bronze medal – third place	2021 Amstelveen
Bronze medal – third place	2023 Mönchengladbach
Hockey World League
Silver medal – second place	2014–15 Raipur	Team

Vincent Vanasch (born 21 December 1987) is a Belgian professional field hockey player who plays as a goalkeeper for Orée and the Belgium national team.

== Club career ==
Vanasch has been involved in hockey from an early age; his father "Jean" created the youth school of the "Royal Evere White Star Hockey Club". He did all his classes until the first team with which he won several titles (grass and indoor). When the club got relegated to Division 1, at the end of the 2006–2007 season, he went to play at the "Royal Penguin Hockey Club Nivellois". He played for two seasons before getting a transfer to KHC Leuven. From the 2010–2011 season onwards, he started playing for the Waterloo Ducks. In 2014, he made a transfer to the Netherlands to Oranje Zwart. He played there until 2016, when he returned to the Waterloo Ducks.

In the 2018–19 Euro Hockey League, Vanasch's Waterloo Ducks became the first Belgian club to win the Euro Hockey League. In January 2020, it was announced he would play for Rot-Weiss Köln in Germany from the 2020–21 season onwards. After three Bundesliga titles in three years he returned to Belgium and signed a three-year contract at Orée.

== International career ==
At the 2012 Summer Olympics, Vanasch competed for the national team in the men's tournament. Vanasch won the silver medal with Belgium at the 2013 European Championship on home ground in Boom. At the 2016 Summer Olympics, he was part of the Belgian team who won the silver medal.

In 2017, Vanasch was named the FIH Goalkeeper of the Year. At the 2018 Hockey Stars Awards he was named the FIH Goalkeeper of the Year for the second time in a row. At the 2019 EuroHockey Championship, where Belgium won its first European title, he was named the goalkeeper of the tournament. In December 2019, he again was nominated for the FIH Goalkeeper of the Year Award. On 11 February 2020, he was awarded his third FIH Goalkeeper of the Year Award. On 25 May 2021, he was selected in the squad for the 2021 EuroHockey Championship.

== Honours ==
=== Club ===
Waterloo Ducks

- Euro Hockey League: 2017–18
- Belgian Hockey League: 2011–12, 2012–13, 2013–14

Oranje Zwart

- Euro Hockey League: 2014–15
- Hoofdklasse: 2014–15, 2015–16

Rot-Weiss Köln

- Bundesliga: 2019–2021, 2021–22, 2022–23

=== International ===
Belgium

- Olympic gold medal: 2020; silver medal: 2016
- World Cup: 2018
- EuroHockey Championship: 2019
- FIH Pro League: 2020–21
- Sultan Azlan Shah Cup: 2025

Preceded by David Harte	FIH Goalkeeper of the Year; 2017–2019	Most recent
