= Subhadra Pradhan =

Indian field hockey player

Personal information
- Born: 5 June 1986 (age 40) Saunamara, Sundergarh, Odisha, India

Sport
- Sport: Field hockey
- Position: Halfback
Senior career
Years	Team	Caps	Goals
–	South Eastern Railway	-	-
2007	HC Den Bosch	-	-
National team
Years	Team	Caps	Goals
2000–2005	India U21		-
2003–2012	India		-
Medal record
Women's field hockey
Representing India
Commonwealth Games
Silver medal – second place	2006 Melbourne	Team
Asian Games
Bronze medal – third place	2006 Doha	Team
Afro-Asian Games
Gold medal – first place	2003 Hyderabad	Team
Asia Cup
Gold medal – first place	2004 New Delhi
Silver medal – second place	2009 Bangkok
Asian Champions Trophy
Bronze medal – third place	2010 Busan
Junior Asia Cup
Bronze medal – third place	2004 Hyderabad

Subhadra Pradhan (born 5 June 1986) is an Indian former field hockey player, who represented the India women's national field hockey team.

== Early life ==
Subhadra Pradhan was born on 5 June 1986 in Saunamara, a small town in Odisha to an Adivasi family. She did schooling in Birsa Munda school and pre-university education in Khalsa College, Patiala. She tutored at the Panposh Hockey Hostel at Rourkela during her initial days and started her career in hockey in 1997.

== Career ==
Subhadra Pradhan was included in India's junior team in 2000 and she led the junior team to a third-place finish at the Junior Asia Cup in October/November 2004. She made her senior debut in 2003. She was a part of the senior team that won the gold medal in the 2004 Asia Cup and the silver medal at the 2006 Commonwealth Games. In 2007, Subhadra Pradhan and Jasjeet Kaur became the first Indian women to play for a European club, when they played for the Dutch club HC Den Bosch in 2007. She was awarded the 'Player of the Tournament' in the 2009 Asia Cup where India finished second.

== Personal life ==
Subhadra Pradhan married Pradeep Naik in April 2009. She is employed with the South Eastern Railway and is currently stationed in Ranchi.

== Awards and honours ==
In 2006, she was given the Ekalavya Award for her contribution to Indian hockey.
