= Barrio Fisherton =

Barrio in Rosario, province of Santa Fe, Argentina

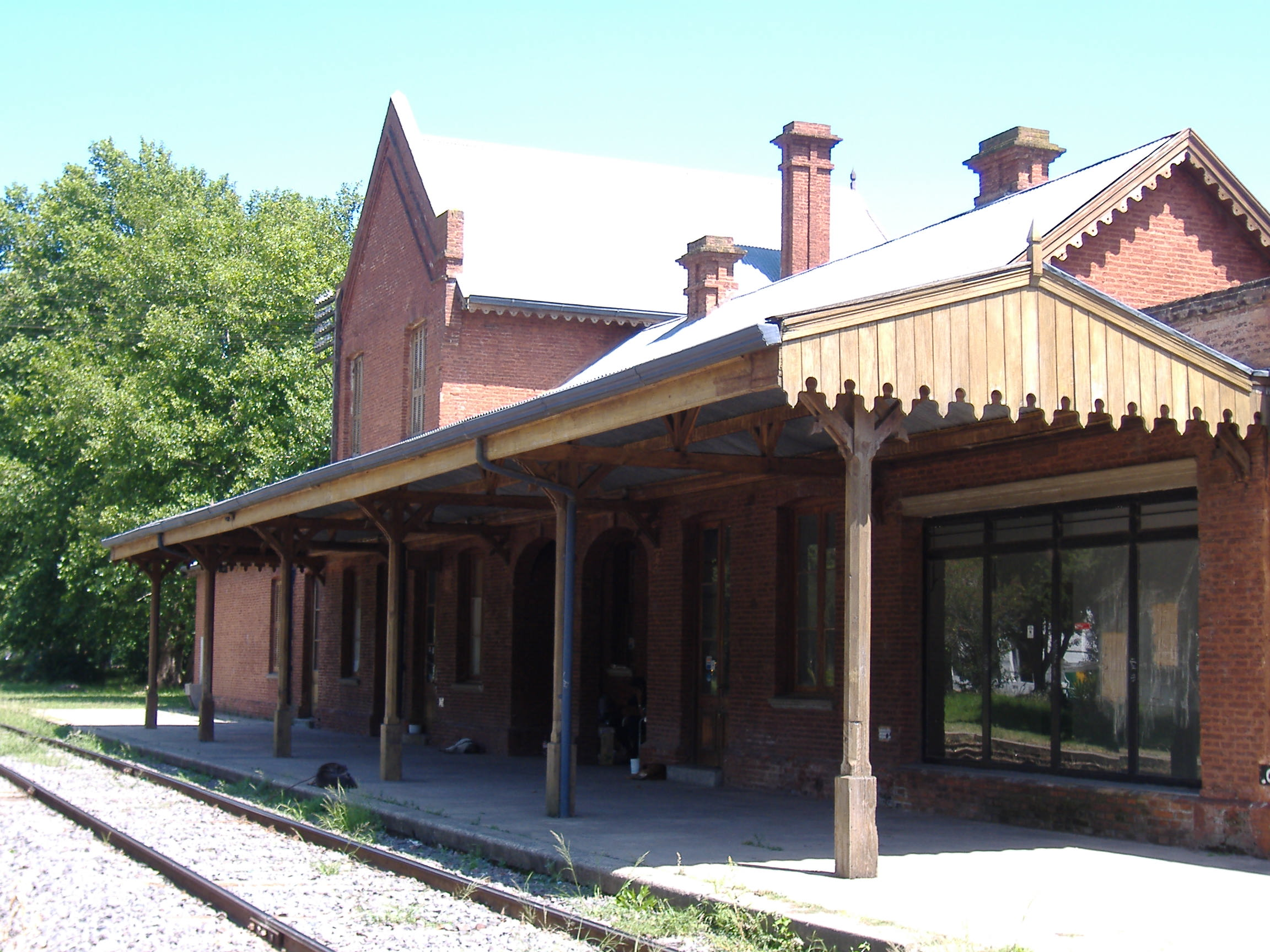
Antártida Argentina railway station

Fisherton (Spanish pronunciation: [fiˈʃeɾton]) is a barrio (traditional neighborhood) in Rosario, province of Santa Fe, Argentina. It is located in the western part of the city. Its main street is Eva Perón Avenue (continuation of Córdoba Street, going east–west).

Fisherton is primarily an upper middle-class, residential neighborhood. It features two social clubs, the Club Fisherton and the Jockey Club, the latter being of national importance in the sports fields of rugby, hockey, and golf.

The barrio was started in the 1880s. The planning was conducted by famous architect Alejandro Bustillo. It was a small village designed to accommodate the personnel of the British companies that were investing in the nascent Argentine railway system at the time, and was absorbed into the city later. This past is preserved by the former Antártida Argentina railway station, which was turned into an exhibition hall, and by several old English-style mansions.
