= Masako Sato (field hockey) =

Japanese field hockey player (born 1987)

Medal record

Women's field hockey

Representing Japan

Asian Champions Trophy
| Bronze medal – third place | 2011 Ordos | |

Masako Sato (佐藤 雅子, Satō Masako; born 27 November 1987, in Yazu) is a Japanese field hockey player. At the 2012 Summer Olympics she competed with the Japan women's national field hockey team in the women's tournament.
