= Jocelyn Bartram =

Australian field hockey player

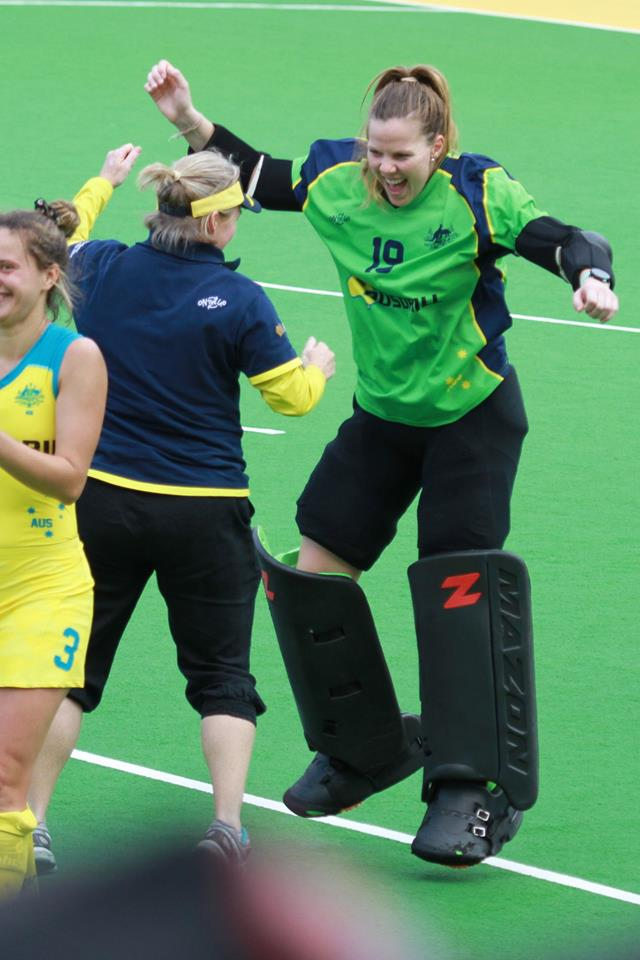
- Jocelyn Bartram

Personal information
- Full name: Jocelyn Margaret Bartram
- Born: 4 May 1993 (age 33) Albury, Australia
- Height: 180 cm (5 ft 11 in)

Sport
- Sport: Field hockey
- Position: Goalkeeper
- Club: New South Wales Arrows
National team
Years	Team	Caps	Goals
2016–	Australia	48	(0)
Medal record
World Cup
Bronze medal – third place	2022 Terrassa/Amstelveen
Oceania Cup
Gold medal – first place	2023 Whangārei
FIH Pro League
Bronze medal – third place	2022–23
Commonwealth Games
Silver medal – second place	2018 Gold Coast
Silver medal – second place	2022 Birmingham

Jocelyn Margaret Bartram (born 4 May 1993) is an Australian field hockey player. She plays as a goalkeeper for the Australian women's national field hockey team.

== Early life and education ==
Jocelyn Bartram is from Albury, Australia. Bartram was an active child, playing field hockey, soccer, water polo, basketball and tennis during her youth. Her mother, father and brother also played hockey. Bartram commenced her studies focusing on Sports Science through University of Technology, Sydney. More recently she has transferred her sports science studies to Edith Cowan University in Perth, in conjunction with her move to Perth for her permanent placement in the Hockeyroos squad.

== Career ==
Bartram spent two years on the Under-21 team for Australian women's field hockey. She was then cut from the team in the lead up to the 2013 Under-21 field hockey world cup. Bartram has played goalkeeper for the NSW team in the Australian Hockey League since 2008. In 2014, national selectors noticed her performance in the Australian Hockey League and named Bartram to the national development squad, allowing Bartram to train with the national team.

Bartram made her debut playing for Australia's women's national field hockey team in March 2016. Beyond playing with the national team, Bartram also plays for the Suburban Lions. Bartram was also part of the team for the 2017 Oceania Cup. Since then she has toured with the Hockeyroos for the 2017 world league, 2018 world cup and 2019 Pro league, accumulating over 40 international caps.

In 2022 she was the goalkeeper of the winning NSW Pride team in the 2022 Women's HockeyOne grand final. She defended a shootout to win the premiership.
