= Jasjeet Kaur Handa =

Indian field hockey player

Medal record

Representing India

Women's field hockey

Commonwealth Games
Silver medal – second place	2006 Melbourne	Team

Asian Games
Bronze medal – third place	2006 Doha	Team

Asia Cup
Gold medal – first place	2004 New Delhi	
Silver medal – second place	2009 Bangkok	

Asian Champions Trophy
Bronze medal – third place	2010 Busan	

Junior Asia Cup
Bronze medal – third place	2004 Hyderabad	

Jasjeet Kaur Handa (born 20 December 1987, Shahabad Markanda, Haryana) is an Indian former field hockey player, who represented the India women's national field hockey team. She hails from Haryana and was part of the team that won the gold at the 2004 Women's Hockey Asia Cup.

In 2007, Jasjeet Kaur and Subhadra Pradhan became the first Indian women to play for a European club, when they played for the Dutch club HC Den Bosch in 2007.

She was given the Arjuna award in 2010.
