= Saba Anjum Karim =

Indian field hockey player

Saba Anjum
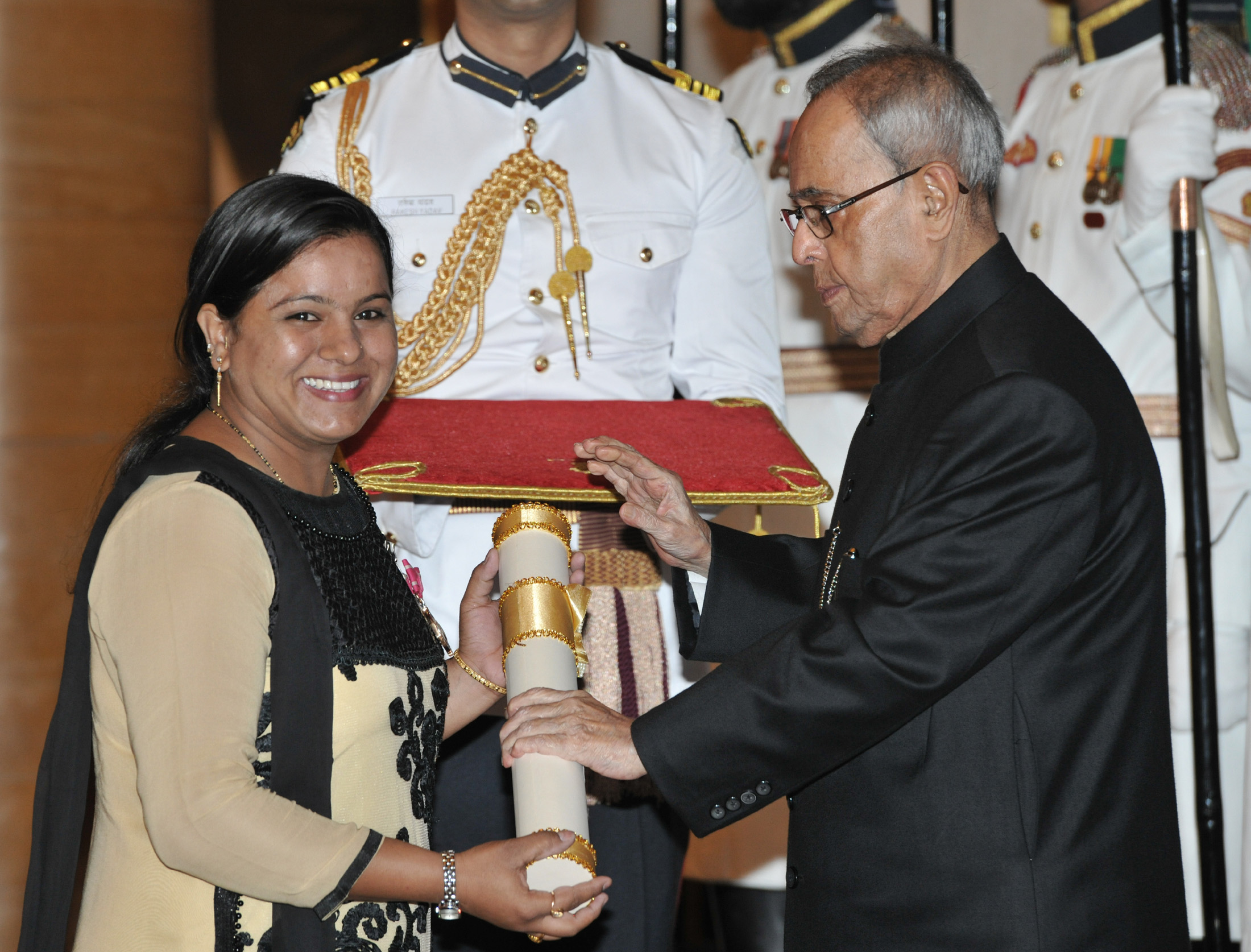

Personal information
- Born: 12 June 1985 (age 41) Durg, Chhattisgarh, India

Sport
- Sport: Field hockey
- Position: Forward
National team
| Years | Team | Caps | Goals |
| 2000–present | India | 200 | (92) |
Medal record
Representing India
Women's field hockey
Commonwealth Games
| Gold medal – first place | 2002 Manchester | Team |
| Silver medal – second place | 2006 Melbourne | Team |
Asia Cup
| Gold medal – first place | 2004 New Delhi |
| Silver medal – second place | 2009 Bangkok |
Asian Games
| Bronze medal – third place | 2006 Doha | Team |
Asian Champions Trophy
| Bronze medal – third place | 2010 Busan |

Saba Anjum (born 12 June 1985) is an Indian former field hockey player, who has represented the India women's national field hockey team. She was the youngest of all participants in the hockey competition at the 2002 Commonwealth Games in Manchester.

She first played for India in the under-18 AHF Cup in 2000. As a right wing forward, she has represented India in many other international tournaments like Asian Games Oct 2002, Asia Cup Feb 2004 Delhi, Commonwealth Games 2002 and 2006, Manchester, Junior World Cup May 2001, Buenos Aires and Australian Test Series and New Zealand Tour.

She hails from Kelabadi, Durg. On 1 November, she was honored with Chhattisgarh's top Gundadhur sports award. The annual award is given to a person who brings honor to the state in the field of sports at national and international level. The award is given along with a cash prize of Rs 0.1 million and a citation. The Government of Chhattisgarh has honoured her by giving posting in police department at the post of Deputy Superintendent of Police (DSP). @ Chhattisgarh Durg For year 2013, she is honored with Arjuna award by the president of India.

She was awarded Padma Shri, the fourth highest civilian award of India, in 2015.
