= Josefina Sruoga =

Olympic field hockey player

Personal information
- Full name: María Josefina Sruoga
- Born: August 23, 1990 (age 36) Buenos Aires. Argentina
- Height: 1.71 m (5 ft 7 1/2 in)

Sport
- Sport: Field hockey
- Position: Forward
- Club: GEBA
Senior career
Years	Team	Caps	Goals
–	GEBA	-	-
National team
Years	Team	Caps	Goals
2008–2009	Argentina U21		-
2009–2015	Argentina	197	-
Medal record
Women's Field hockey
Representing Argentina
Summer Olympics
Silver medal – second place	2012 London	Team
World Cup
Bronze medal – third place	2014 The Hague	Team
Champions Trophy
Gold medal – first place	2009 Sydney	Team
Gold medal – first place	2010 Nottingham	Team
Gold medal – first place	2012 Rosario	Team
Gold medal – first place	2014 Mendoza	Team
Silver medal – second place	2011 Amstelveen	Team
Pan American Games
Silver medal – second place	2011 Guadalajara	Team
Silver medal – second place	2015 Toronto	Team
Junior World Cup
Silver medal – second place	2009 Boston	Team

María Josefina Sruoga (born 23 August 1990) is an Argentine field hockey player. At the 2012 Summer Olympics, she competed for the Argentina national team where the team won the silver medal. Josefina also won four Champions Trophies, the bronze medal at the 2014 World Cup and two silver medals at the Pan American Games. Her sister Dani was also part of the Argentine team that won silver at the 2012 Summer Olympics.
