= Anne Veenendaal =

Dutch field hockey player

Personal information
- Born: 7 September 1995 (age 31)
- Height: 1.76 m (5 ft 9 in)

Sport
- Sport: Field hockey
- Position: Goalkeeper
- Club: Amsterdam
National team
Years	Team	Caps	Goals
2015–	Netherlands	102	(0)
Medal record
Olympic Games
Gold medal – first place	2024 Paris	Team
World Cup
Gold medal – first place	2018 London
Gold medal – first place	2022 Terrassa/Amstelveen
Silver medal – second place	2026 Wavre/Amstelveen
European Championship
Gold medal – first place	2017 Amstelveen
Gold medal – first place	2019 Antwerp
Gold medal – first place	2021 Amstelveen
Gold medal – first place	2023 Mönchengladbach
Gold medal – first place	2025 Mönchengladbach
Silver medal – second place	2015 London
Champions Trophy
Gold medal – first place	2018 Changzhou
Silver medal – second place	2016 London

Anne Veenendaal (born 7 September 1995) is a Dutch field hockey player for the Dutch national team who plays as a goalkeeper.

Veenendaal made her debut for the Netherlands national team on 22 August 2015, at the age of nineteen, in a match against Poland during the 2015 European Championship in London.

With the Dutch team she won gold at the 2017 European Championship, and the 2018 World Cup. She was also part of the gold-winning women's field hockey team at the 2024 Paris Olympics. She is openly lesbian.
