= Lesle-Ann George =

South African field hockey player

Medal record

Women's field hockey

Representing South Africa

Africa Cup of Nations
| Gold medal – first place | 2005 Pretoria | |

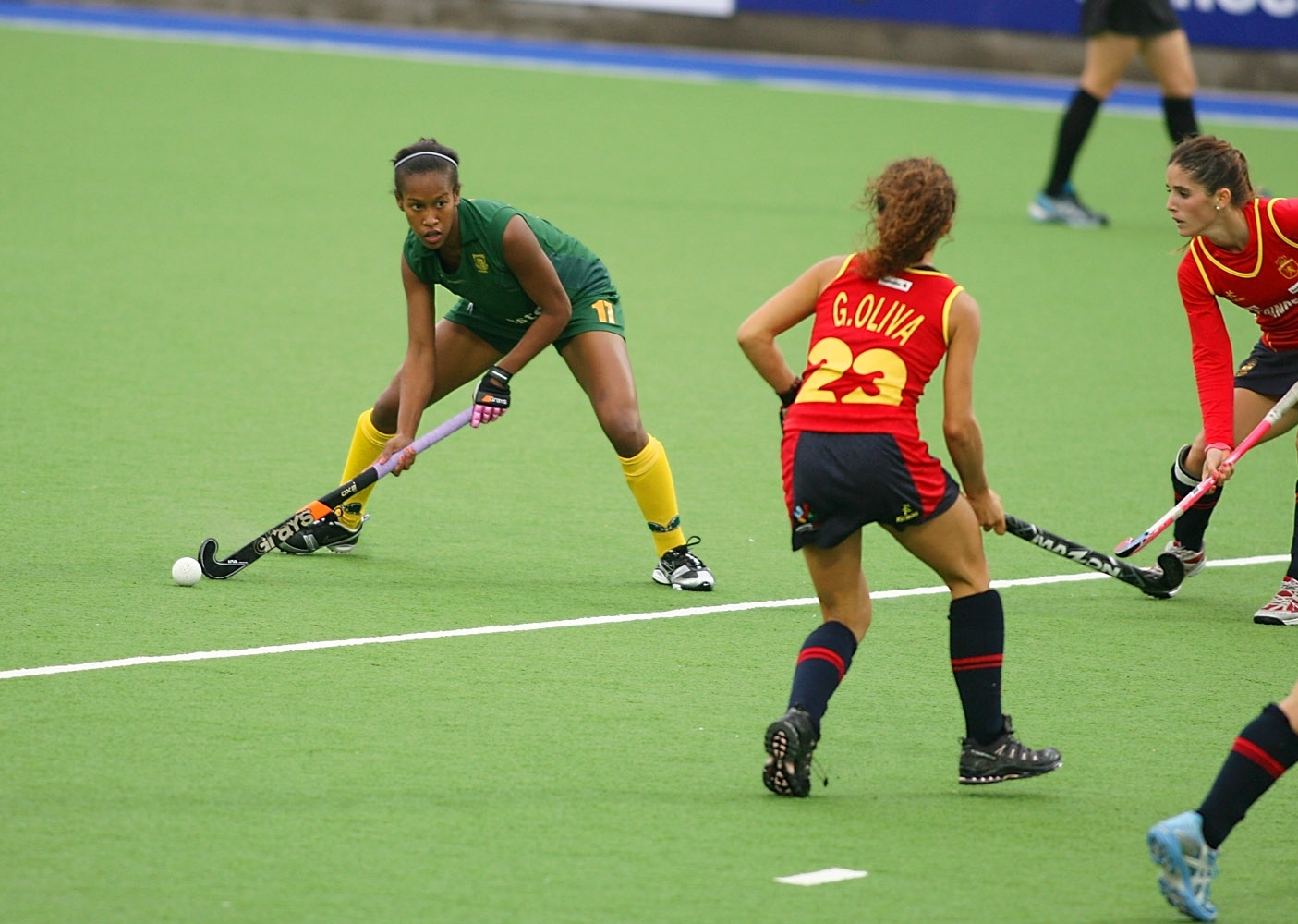
2010 Women's Hockey World Cup

Lesle-Ann George (born 20 October 1985) is a South African field hockey player who competed in the 2008 Summer Olympics and 2012 Summer Olympics.
