= Crista Cullen =

English field hockey player

Crista Cullen MBE
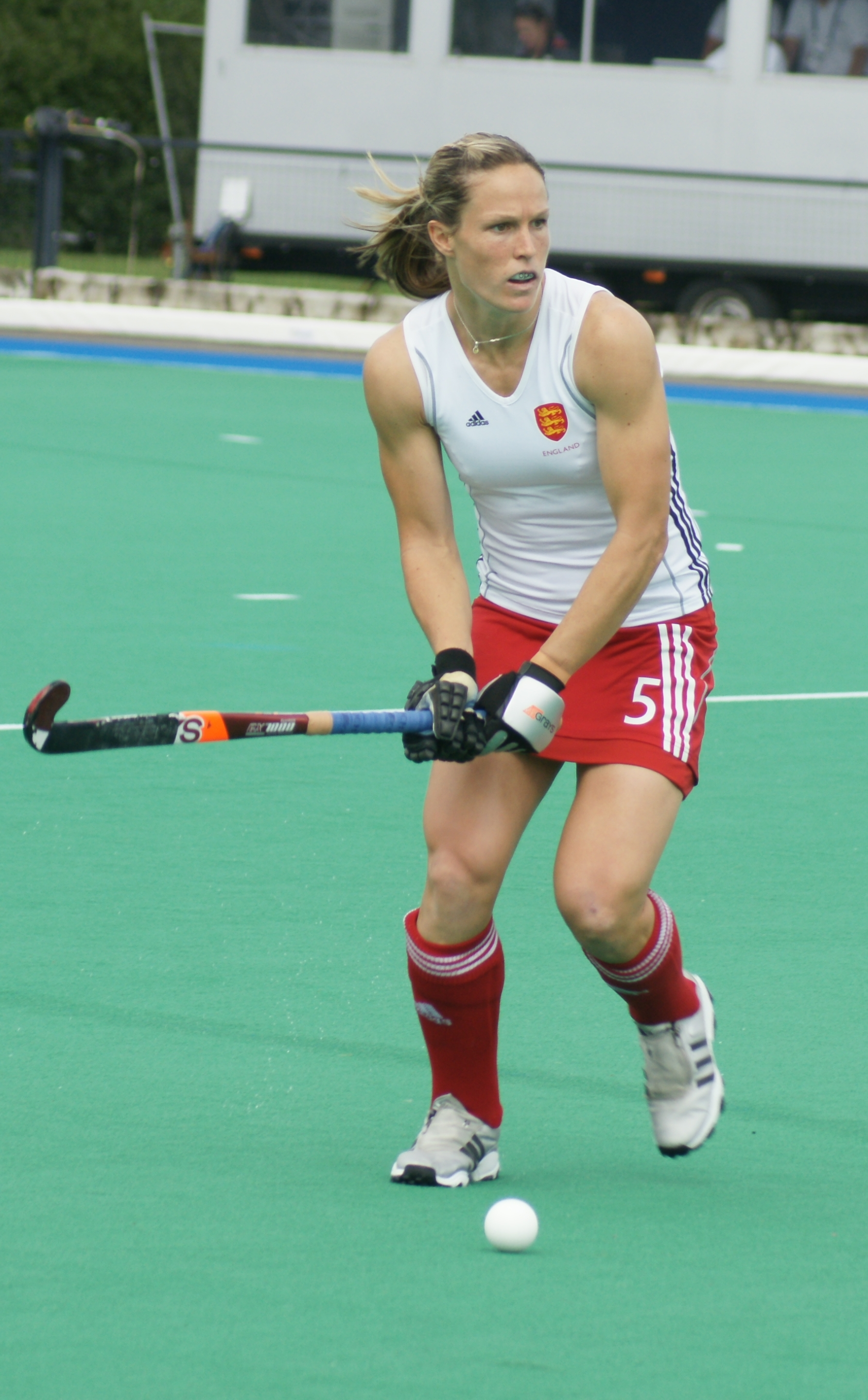
- Crista Cullen in 2010

Personal information
- Nationality: British
- Born: 20 August 1985 (age 40) Boston, Lincolnshire, England
- Height: 1.82 m (6 ft 0 in)
- Weight: 74 kg (163 lb)

Sport
- Country: Great Britain; England
- Sport: Hockey
Medal record
Representing Great Britain
Olympic Games
Gold medal – first place	2016 Rio de Janeiro	Team
Bronze medal – third place	2012 London	Team
Representing England
European Championship
Bronze medal – third place	2007 Manchester
Bronze medal – third place	2011 Gladbach
Champions Trophy
Silver medal – second place	2012 Rosario
Commonwealth Games
Bronze medal – third place	2006 Melbourne	Team

Chay Crista Kerio Cullen (born 20 August 1985) is an Olympic Gold Medal-winning English field hockey player.

== Hockey career ==
Cullen made her senior international debut for England in 2003. She was part of the Great Britain squad which won Bronze at the 2012 Summer Olympics in London, as well as the England squad that won Bronze at the 2006 Commonwealth Games in Melbourne.

She retired from international hockey after the 2012 Summer Olympics, aged 27. She earned 171 international caps. She came out of retirement in 2015 to join the Great Britain team for the 2016 Rio Olympics and played an instrumental part in a team that went unbeaten throughout the tournament, eventually winning an Olympic gold medal.

She has played club hockey for Leicester, based at the Stoneygate Preparatory School in Great Glen.

== Awards ==
She was named in the International Hockey federation World Star XI following the 2006 Hockey World Cup, as well as 2006 Great Britain Hockey Athlete of the Year and Hockey Writers' 2005 and 2006 UK Hockey Player of the Year.

In 2006 and 2008 she was nominated for the FIH Player of the Year Awards (Young Woman) Award and in 2012 she was nominated for the FIH Hockey Player of the Year (Woman) Award.

Cullen was appointed Member of the Order of the British Empire (MBE) in the 2017 New Year Honours for services to hockey.

== Personal life ==
Cullen attended the independent Oakham School in Rutland. She then gained a BA in Business Studies (Strategy & Entrepreneurship) at the Nottingham Business School, gaining a 2.1 in 2006. She works as a Business Development Consultant for The Kennel Club and as Performance Director for Edwin Doran Sports Tours (edwindoran.com). Her father was a golfer and her mother played professional squash. She first played hockey aged nine, when living in Kenya until she was twelve. Her parents still live in Kenya where they run the Hemingways hotel near Watamu. Her brother Gray Cullen played junior rugby for England and in 2009 debuted for the Kenya national rugby union team. Following her success at the 2016 Rio de Janeiro Olympic, Games, Crista Cullen has founded Tofauti which is a charity aimed at making sustained conservational change in Africa. In 2020, Cullen's Tofauti Foundation became the charity partner of the Tofauti Everyone Active junior women and men's cycling team.
