= Cheon Seul-ki =

South Korean field hockey player

Personal information
- Born: 28 January 1989 (age 37) Seoul, South Korea
- Height: 1.67 m (5 ft 6 in)
- Weight: 70 kg (154 lb)

Sport
- Sport: Field hockey
National team
Years	Team	Caps	Goals
–	South Korea	130	-
Medal record
Women's field hockey
Representing South Korea
Asian Games
Silver medal – second place	2010 Guangzhou	Team
Asia Cup
Silver medal – second place	2007 Hong Kong
Silver medal – second place	2013 Kuala Lumpur
Bronze medal – third place	2009 Bangkok
Asian Champions Trophy
Gold medal – first place	2010 Busan
Gold medal – first place	2011 Ordos
Gold medal – first place	2018 Donghae

Cheon Seul-ki (born 28 January 1989) is a South Korean field hockey player. At the 2012 Summer Olympics she competed with the Korea women's national field hockey team in the women's tournament.
