= Carol Metchette =

Irish field hockey player and umpire

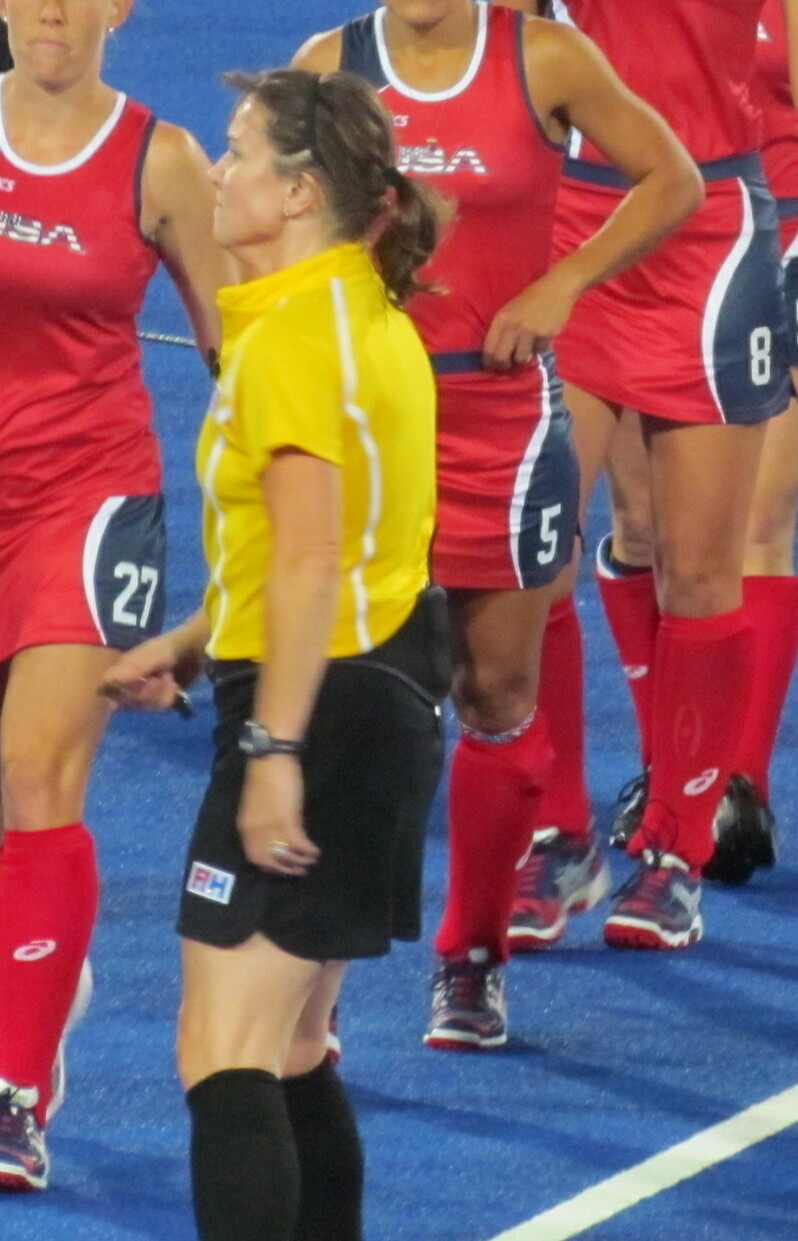
- 2012 Summer Olympics

Personal information
- Born: Dublin, Ireland

Sport
- Sport: Field hockey
Senior career
Years	Team	Caps	Goals
–	Old Alex	-	-

Carol Metchette is an Irish field hockey player and umpire from Dublin, Ireland. She retired from playing in 2002 and became an umpire until 2012 when she was forced to retire due to the International Hockey Federation (IHF) creating a mandatory retirement age for umpires. She is currently an IHF video referee.

== Playing career ==
Metchette started playing hockey while at school at Wesley College where she won the ESB Kate Russell All Ireland Schools Championship, Leinster Schools League and Leinster Schoolgirls' Senior Cup. After leaving school, she played hockey at club level for Old Alex where she won the Irish Senior Cup in 1988 and 1991. She played for Old Alex for eighteen years before retiring in 2002.

== Umpiring career ==
After retiring from playing, Metchette took up umpiring as a way to give something back to the game. In her first year as an umpire, she was appointed to international under-18s matches. Following good performances at European Hockey Federation and International Hockey Federation events, Metchette was invited to umpire at the 2008 Summer Olympics. After this she was also selected to umpire at the 2012 Summer Olympics.

In November 2012, the International Hockey Federation decided to make changes to its top level umpire selection policies. They changed the system from passing required annual fitness tests to all umpires having a mandatory retirement age of 47. Despite Metchette having the best fitness test results of all of the IHF's umpires and being considered by her peers one of the best hockey umpires, as she was over 47 she was forced to retire. Her final game was a Champions Challenge I match between the Australia women's national field hockey team and the United States women's national field hockey team. Following her on-field retirement, Metchette became an IHF-appointed video referee.
