= Daniela Sruoga =

Argentine field hockey player (born 1987)

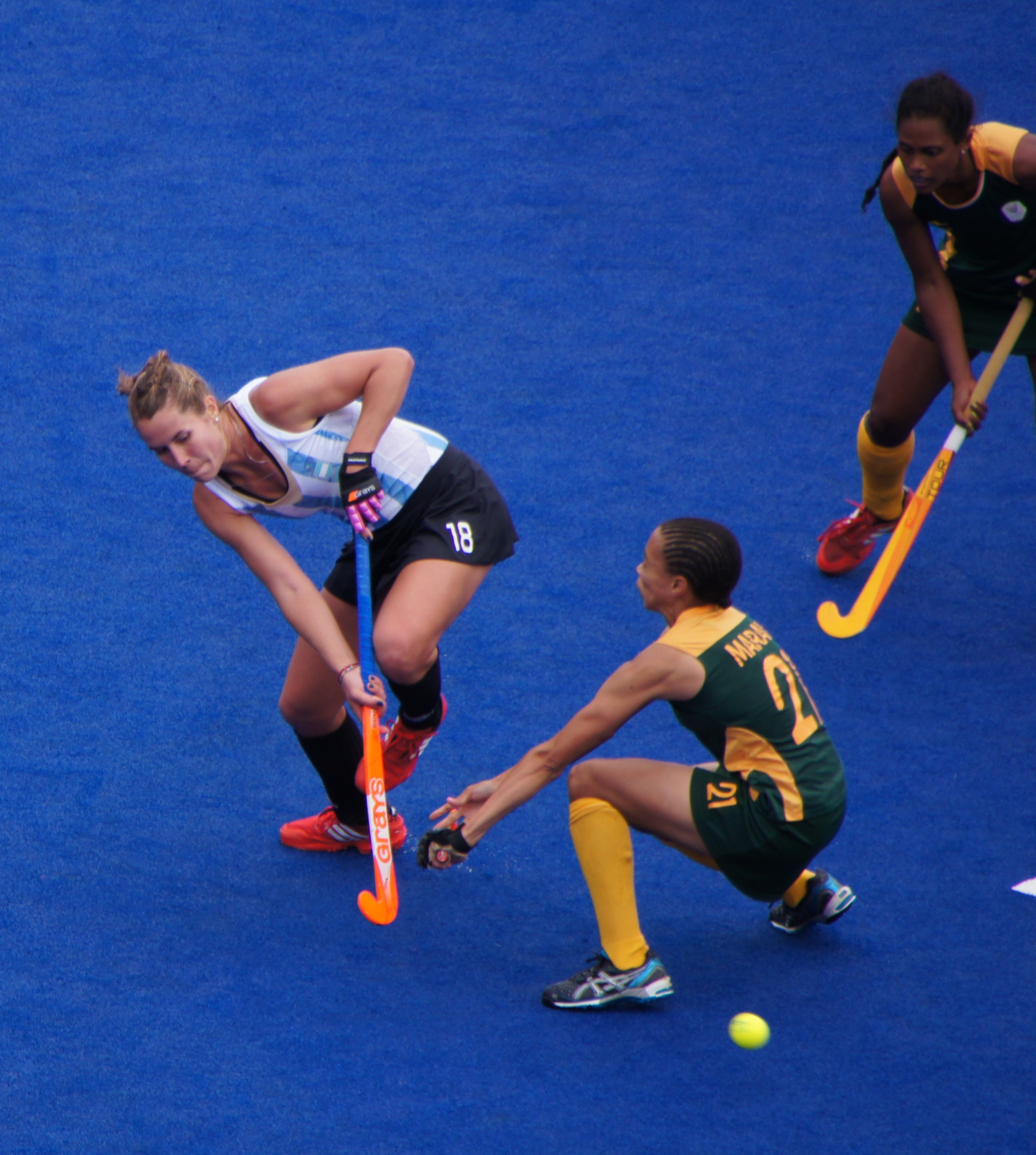

Personal information
- Full name: Daniela Lucía Sruoga
- Born: September 21, 1987 (age 38) Buenos Aires, Argentina
- Height: 1.71 m (5 ft 7 1/2 in)

Sport
- Sport: Field hockey
- Position: Midfielder
- Club: GEBA
Senior career
Years	Team	Caps	Goals
–	GEBA	-	-
National team
Years	Team	Caps	Goals
2008	Argentina U21		-
2009–2014	Argentina	177	-
Medal record
Women's Field hockey
Representing Argentina
Summer Olympics
Silver medal – second place	2012 London	Team
World Cup
Gold medal – first place	2010 Rosario
Bronze medal – third place	2014 The Hague
Champions Trophy
Gold medal – first place	2009 Sydney
Gold medal – first place	2010 Nottingham
Gold medal – first place	2012 Rosario
Silver medal – second place	2011 Amstelveen
Pan American Games
Silver medal – second place	2011 Guadalajara	Team
Pan American Cup
Gold medal – first place	2009 Hamilton
Gold medal – first place	2013 Mendoza

Daniela Lucía Sruoga (born 21 September 1987) is an Argentine field hockey player. At the 2012 Summer Olympics, she competed for the national team and won the silver medal. Daniela also won the 2010 World Cup in Rosario, Argentina and three Champions Trophy (2009, 2010, 2012). Her sister, Josefina, also competed for Argentina in Olympic hockey at the 2012 Olympics.
