= Elena Eskina =

Russian field hockey player and umpire

Elena Eskina (Russian: Елена Михайловна Эскина; born 30 March 1976, Moscow, USSR) is a retired Russian field hockey player and umpire.

She was a member of Russia U-21 team at 1992 and 1996 European Championship and was also selected for the national team for 1999 Women's EuroHockey Nations Championship but she decided not to go to the tournament because she was pregnant. In 2000 she finished her playing career.

Elena make her international umpiring debut in 2002 in a game between Germany and Australia (2:2). Subsequently, she has umpired in many important international tournaments including Euro Championships, World Cups, Commonwealth Games, Champions Trophy and also she was a part of the lists of umpires at 2012 and 2016 Summer Olympics.

Elena was named the best Russian field hockey umpire at least three times (2004, 2005, 2009).

In 2015 Elena became the 38th umpire to reach the golden whistle milestone – 100 international games – when she umpired Argentina against China in the semi-final stage of the Hockey World League Semi-Final in Valencia.
