= Li Hongxia =

Chinese field hockey player

Personal information
- Born: 10 September 1986 (age 39) Liaoning Province, China
Medal record
Women's field hockey
Representing China
Olympic Games
| Silver medal – second place | 2008 Beijing | Team |
Asian Games
| Gold medal – first place | 2006 Doha | Team |
| Gold medal – first place | 2010 Guangzhou | Team |
| Silver medal – second place | 2014 Incheon | Team |
Asia Cup
| Gold medal – first place | 2009 Bangkok |
| Bronze medal – third place | 2007 Hong Kong |
Asian Champions Trophy
| Silver medal – second place | 2011 Ordos |

Li Hongxia (simplified Chinese: 李红侠; traditional Chinese: 李紅俠; pinyin: Lǐ Hóngxiá; born 10 September 1986 in Liaoning Province) is a field hockey player from China. She won a silver medal with the national women's hockey team at the 2008 Summer Olympics in Beijing.

She won a silver medal as a member of the Chinese team at 2014 Asian Games.
