= Zhao Yudiao =

Chinese field hockey player

Zhao Yudiao 赵玉雕
Personal information
- Born: May 25, 1989 (age 37) Linghai, Jinzhou, Liaoning, China
Medal record
Women's field hockey
Representing China
Olympic Games
Silver medal – second place	2008 Beijing	Team
Asian Games
Gold medal – first place	2010 Guangzhou	Team
Silver medal – second place	2014 Incheon	Team
Asia Cup
Gold medal – first place	2009 Bangkok
Asian Champions Trophy
Silver medal – second place	2011 Ordos

Zhao Yudiao (Chinese: 赵玉雕; born May 25, 1989, in Linghai, Jinzhou, Liaoning) is a Chinese female professional field hockey player, who won a silver medal with the national women's hockey team at the 2008 Summer Olympics in Beijing.

She won a silver medal as a member of the Chinese team at 2014 Asian Games.
