= 2011 Women's Hockey Champions Trophy =

Tournament details
- Host country: Netherlands
- City: Amstelveen
- Dates: 25 June – 3 June
- Teams: 8
- Venue: Wagener Stadium

Final positions
- Champions: Netherlands (6th title)
- Runner-up: Argentina
- Third place: New Zealand

Tournament statistics
- Matches played: 24
- Goals scored: 83 (3.46 per match)
- Top scorer: (Netherlands) Maartje Paumen (6 goals)
- Best player: (Netherlands) Maartje Paumen

The 2011 Women's Hockey Champions Trophy was the 19th edition of the Hockey Champions Trophy for women. It was held from 25 June to 3 July 2011 in Amstelveen, Netherlands.

The Netherlands won the tournament for the sixth time after defeating Argentina 3–2 in the final on a penalty shoot-out after a 3–3 draw, tying the record previously set by Australia in 2003 of six titles won. New Zealand won the third place match by defeating Korea 3–2 to claim their first ever Champions Trophy medal.

After the preliminaries were over, the final originally was scheduled to be played between the Netherlands and Korea, but the Argentine side protested against the second round standing in which they were ranked third behind Korea based on goals scored in that round. After a second appeal by the Argentine team, the final day schedule was changed, since the regulations stated that in case of a draw in points in the second round, the total points in the tournament should be the next tie-breaker.

== Format ==
A new format was used for the 2011 tournament, with eight teams participating instead of the traditional six. All temas are split in two groups (pools A and B) and play a round robin. The top two teams advance to Pool C and play for the medals, the bottom two teams play in Pool D for fifth to eighth place. For this second round, points for the game with the advancing team from the same preliminary group are carried over and two games are played against teams from the other group. In the final classification games, the two top teams from Group C play for gold, the third and fourth team for bronze. The two top teams from Group D play for fifth and sixth place, while the third and fourth team of Group D play for seventh and eighth Place.

== Teams ==
The participating teams were determined by International Hockey Federation (FIH):

- Argentina (Defending champions and champions of 2010 World Cup)
- Netherlands (Host nation and champions of 2008 Summer Olympics)
- England (Third in 2010 World Cup)
- Germany (Fourth in 2010 World Cup)
- Australia (Fifth in 2010 World Cup)
- South Korea (Sixth in 2010 World Cup)
- China (Invitational)
- New Zealand (Invitational)

== Squads ==
Argentina

Head coach: Carlos Retegui

1. Belén Succi (GK)
4. Rosario Luchetti
5. Macarena Rodríguez
8. Luciana Aymar (C)
10. Soledad García
11. Carla Rebecchi
12. Delfina Merino
13. María Aladro (GK)
16. Florencia Habif
17. Rocío Sánchez Moccia
18. Daniela Sruoga
19. Sofía Maccari
20. Victoria Zuloaga
21. Mariela Scarone
25. Silvina D'Elía
26. Giselle Kañevsky
27. Noel Barrionuevo
30. Josefina Sruoga
Australia

Head coach: Adam Commens

1. Toni Cronk (GK)
4. Casey Eastham
5. Renee Trost
6. Megan Rivers
7. Jodie Schulz
8. Ashleigh Nelson
9. Anna Flanagan
11. Jacklyn McRae
12. Madonna Blyth (C)
15. Kobie McGurk
16. Kellie White
17. Emily Hurtz
20. Marnie Hudson
21. Jayde Taylor
25. Jade Warrender
27. Rachael Lynch (GK)
28. Georgina Parker
31. Jade Close
China

Head coach: Kim Sang-Ryul

1. Ma Yibo
2. Wang Mengyu
3. Mao Weilin
5. Ma Wei
6. Sun Sinan
8. Fu Baorong
10. Gao Lihua
12. Bao Qianqian
13. Hu Pan
16. Zhang Yimeng (GK)
17. Li Hongxia (C)
19. Huang Ting
21. Zhao Yudiao
22. Song Qingling
23. De Jiaojiao
25. Xu Xiaoxu
29. Peng Yang
31. Zhang Lei (GK)
England

Head coach: Danny Kerry

1. Elizabeth Storry (GK)
4. Laura Unsworth
5. Crista Cullen
6. Hannah MacLeod
7. Anne Panter
8. Helen Richardson
11. Kate Walsh (C)
12. Chloe Rogers
13. Kerry Williams
15. Alexandra Danson
17. Rebecca Herbert
18. Georgina Twigg
21. Samantha Quek
22. Ashleigh Ball
23. Sally Walton
24. Anna Bennett
28. Nicola White
30. Madeleine Hinch (GK)
Germany

Head coach: Michael Behrmann

1. Yvonne Frank (GK)
6. Luisa Steindor
7. Natascha Keller
8. Christina Schütze (C)
9. Kristina Hillmann
10. Nina Hasselmann
13. Katharina Otte
14. Jana Teschke
17. Barbara Vogel (GK)
20. Lena Andersch
22. Janine Beermann
23. Marie Mävers
24. Maike Stöckel
25. Janne Müller-Wieland
26. Celine Wilde
28. Julia Müller
30. Nina Sehlmann
31. Jula Karwatzky
Netherlands

Head coach: (Argentina) Maximiliano Caldas

1. Floortje Engels (GK)
2. Willemijn Bos
5. Carlien Dirkse van den Heuvel
6. Claire Verhage
8. Marieke Veenhoven-Mattheussens
9. Wieke Dijkstra
12. Lidewij Welten
15. Sabine Mol
16. Carlijn Welten
17. Maartje Paumen (C)
22. Joyce Sombroek (GK)
23. Kim Lammers
24. Eva de Goede
27. Marilyn Agliotti
28. Merel de Blaey
29. Caia van Maasakker
30. Margot van Geffen
31. Daphne van der Velden
New Zealand

Head coach: (Australia) Mark Hager

1. Kayla Sharland (C)
2. Emily Naylor (C)
3. Krystal Forgesson
5. Katie Glynn
8. Sally Rutherford (GK)
9. Alana Millington
12. Elizabeth Gunson
16. Clarissa Eshuis
17. Lucy Talbot
20. Samantha Harrison
21. Cathryn Finlayson
22. Gemma Flynn
23. Anna Thorpe
27. Sophie Devine
28. Charlotte Harrison
30. Bianca Russell (GK)
31. Stacey Michelsen
32. Anita Punt
South Korea

Head coach: Lim Jung-Woo

1. Moon Young-Hee (GK)
3. Kim Young-Ran
5. Cho Eun-Ji
6. Park Seon-Mi (C)
7. Lee Seon-Ok
8. Kim Jung-Hee
9. Eum Mi-Young
10. Park Mi-Hyun
11. Kim Jong-Eun
12. Kim Da-Rae
13. Cheon Eun-Bi
14. Hong Ji-Seon
15. Gim Sung-Hee
16. Jang Soo-Ji (GK)
17. Kim Ok-Ju
21. Hong Yoo-Jin
22. Park Ki-Ju
23. Kim Ah-Ra

== Umpires ==
Below are the 11 umpires appointed by the International Hockey Federation:

- Stella Bartlema (NED)
- Frances Block (ENG)
- Elena Eskina (RUS)
- Amy Hassick (USA)
- Christiane Hippler (GER)
- Kelly Hudson (NZL)
- Michelle Joubert (RSA)
- Miao Lin (CHN)
- Irene Presenqui (ARG)
- Lisa Roach (AUS)
- Chieko Soma (JPN)

== Results ==
All times are Central European Summer Time (UTC+02:00)

=== First round ===
==== Pool A ====
Pos	Team	Pld	W	D	L	GF	GA	GD	Pts	Qualification
1	Argentina	3	2	1	0	6	2	+4	7	Advance to Medal round
2	South Korea	3	0	3	0	5	5	0	3	Advance to Medal round
3	England	3	0	2	1	2	3	−1	2	
4	China	3	0	2	1	3	6	−3	2	

Source: FIH
Rules for classification: 1) points; 2) goal difference; 3) goals scored; 4) head-to-head result.

25 June 2011
09:00

China	2–2	South Korea
Zhao 58'; Mao 68'	Report	Cheon 41'; Kim Jong-H. 52'

Umpires:
Frances Block (ENG)
Irene Presenqui (ARG)

25 June 2011
11:30

Argentina	1–0	England
Aymar 52'	Report

Umpires:
Lisa Roach (AUS)
Amy Hassick (USA)

26 June 2011
09:00

England	2–2	South Korea
Herbert 21', 63'	Report	Kim D. 39', 60'

Umpires:
Chieko Soma (JPN)
Kelly Hudson (NZL)

26 June 2011
11:30

China	1–4	Argentina
Zhao 20'	Report	Barrionuevo 16'; García 43'; Merino 50'; D. Sruoga 56'

Umpires:
Stella Bartlema (NED)
Christiane Hippler (GER)

28 June 2011
11:00

England	0–0	China
	Report

Umpires:
Amy Hassick (USA)
Elena Eskina (RUS)

28 June 2011
15:00

Argentina	1–1	South Korea
D. Sruoga 57'	Report	Park M. 26'

Umpires:
Michelle Joubert (RSA)
Miao Lin (CHN)

==== Pool B ====
Pos	Team	Pld	W	D	L	GF	GA	GD	Pts	Qualification
1	Netherlands	3	2	1	0	5	1	+4	7	Advance to Medal round
2	New Zealand	3	1	1	1	3	3	0	4	Advance to Medal round
3	Germany	3	1	0	2	2	3	−1	3	
4	Australia	3	1	0	2	3	6	−3	3	

Source: FIH
Rules for classification: 1) points; 2) goal difference; 3) goals scored; 4) head-to-head result.

25 June 2011
14:00

Germany	1–0	New Zealand
Müller 28'	Report

Umpires:
Stella Bartlema (NED)
Miao Lin (CHN)

25 June 2011
16:30

Netherlands	3–0	Australia
Paumen 7'; Welten 19'; Dijkstra 57'	Report

Umpires:
Michelle Joubert (RSA)
Elena Eskina (RUS)

26 June 2011
14:00

Australia	2–3	New Zealand
Close 52'; Eastham 64'	Report	Glynn 10'; Forgesson 11'; Finlayson 44'

Umpires:
Frances Block (ENG)
Amy Hassick (USA)

26 June 2011
16:30

Germany	1–2	Netherlands
Keller 10'	Report	Welten 1'; Lammers 14'

Umpires:
Irene Presenqui (ARG)
Lisa Roach (AUS)

28 June 2011
13:00

Australia	1–0	Germany
Schulz 65'	Report

Umpires:
Stella Bartlema (NED)
Kelly Hudson (NZL)

28 June 2011
17:00

Netherlands	0–0	New Zealand
	Report

Umpires:
Chieko Soma (JPN)
Christiane Hippler (GER)

=== Medal round ===
==== Pool C ====
Pos	Team	Pld	W	D	L	GF	GA	GD	Pts	Qualification
1	Netherlands	3	2	1	0	4	1	+3	7	Final
2	Argentina	3	1	1	1	5	5	0	4	Final
3	South Korea	3	1	1	1	6	6	0	4	
4	New Zealand	3	0	1	2	5	8	−3	1	

Source: FIH
Rules for classification: 1) points; 2) goal difference; 3) goals scored; 4) head-to-head result.

Argentina was moved to second place after a second appeal.

30 June 2011
17:00

South Korea	5–3	New Zealand
Kim Jong-H. 7', 55', 67'; Hong Y. 13'; Kim Jong-E. 42'	Report	Glynn 26'; C. Harrison 27'; Finlayson 43'

Umpires:
Elena Eskina (RUS)
Irene Presenqui (ARG)

30 June 2011
19:30

Argentina	1–2	Netherlands
Merino 28'	Report	Paumen 21', 68'

Umpires:
Lisa Roach (AUS)
Frances Block (ENG)

2 July 2011
10:00

Argentina	3–2	New Zealand
García 14'; Aymar 24'; Sánchez Moccia 29'	Report	Eshuis 35+'; C. Harrison 37'

Umpires:
Michelle Joubert (RSA)
Elena Eskina (RUS)

2 July 2011
12:30

South Korea	0–2	Netherlands
	Report	Lammers 1'; Welten 29'

Umpires:
Chieko Soma (JPN)
Irene Presenqui (ARG)

=== Non-medal round ===
==== Pool D ====
Pos	Team	Pld	W	D	L	GF	GA	GD	Pts
1	England	3	2	1	0	4	2	+2	7
2	Australia	3	1	1	1	5	5	0	4
3	Germany	3	1	0	2	4	3	+1	3
4	China	3	0	2	1	3	6	−3	2

Source: FIH
Rules for classification: 1) points; 2) goal difference; 3) goals scored; 4) head-to-head result.

30 June 2011
11:30

China	2–2	Australia
Li 30'; Gao 54'	Report	Eastham 16'; Schulz 23'

Umpires:
Kelly Hudson (NZL)
Christiane Hippler (GER)

30 June 2011
14:00

England	1–0	Germany
Danson 50'	Report

Umpires:
Chieko Soma (JPN)
Michelle Joubert (RSA)

1 July 2011
12:00

China	1–4	Germany
Gao 18'	Report	Wilde 8', 55'; Stöckel 40'; Mävers 46'

Umpires:
Lisa Roach (AUS)
Amy Hassick (USA)

1 July 2011
14:30

England	3–2	Australia
Walsh 34'; Panter 43'; White 60'	Report	Hudson 41', 67'

Umpires:
Stella Bartlema (NED)
Miao Lin (CHN)

=== Classification ===
==== Seventh and eighth place ====
3 July 2011
09:00

Germany	3–5	China
Mävers 31'; Beermann 40'; Müller 43'	Report	Sun 20'; Zhao 22', 26', 54'; Song 30'

Umpires:
Kelly Hudson (NZL)
Amy Hassick (USA)

==== Fifth and sixth place ====
3 July 2011
11:30

England	2–0	Australia
Herbert 8'; Rogers 52'	Report

Umpires:
Michelle Joubert (RSA)
Irene Presenqui (ARG)

==== Third and fourth place ====
3 July 2011
14:00

South Korea	2–3	New Zealand
Kim Jong-E. 42', 56'	Report	Glynn 15'; Forgesson 16'; C. Harrison 70+'

Umpires:
Stella Bartlema (NED)
Frances Block (ENG)

==== Final ====
3 July 2011
16:30

Netherlands	3–3 (a.e.t.)	Argentina
Paumen 35+', 41', 48'	Report	Rebecchi 1'; Aymar 32'; D. Sruoga 34'
Penalties
Bos (penalty shoot-out scored); De Goede (penalty shoot-out scored); Paumen (penalty shoot-out scored); Dirkse van den Heuvel (penalty shoot-out missed)	3–2	(penalty shoot-out scored) García; (penalty shoot-out missed) Rebecchi; (penalty shoot-out missed) Aymar; (penalty shoot-out scored) Merino; (penalty shoot-out missed) D. Sruoga

Umpires:
Lisa Roach (AUS)
Chieko Soma (JPN)

Team details

Netherlands
Argentina

GK	22	Joyce Sombroek
DF	2	Willemijn Bos
DF	6	Claire Verhage
DF	29	Caia van Maasakker
DF	30	Margot van Geffen
MF	15	Sabine Mol
MF	5	Carlien van den Heuvel
MF	17	Maartje Paumen (c)
MF	24	Eva de Goede
FW	23	Kim Lammers
FW	27	Marilyn Agliotti
Substitutions:
MF	8	Marieke Mattheussens	(substituted on) 11'
FW	9	Wieke Dijkstra	(substituted on) 8'
FW	12	Lidewij Welten	(substituted on) 10'
FW	16	Carlijn Welten	(substituted on) 7'
	28	Merel de Blaeij	(substituted on) 12'
Manager:
(Argentina) Maximiliano Caldas

GK	1	Belén Succi
DF	5	Macarena Rodríguez
DF	25	Silvina D'Elía
DF	27	Noel Barrionuevo
MF	4	Rosario Luchetti
MF	18	Daniela Sruoga
MF	8	Luciana Aymar (c)	20
MF	21	Mariela Scarone
FW	10	Soledad García
FW	11	Carla Rebecchi
FW	19	Sofía Maccari
Substitutions:
FW	7	Alejandra Gulla		(substituted on) 13'
FW	12	Delfina Merino		(substituted on) 6'
FW	16	Florencia Habif		(substituted on) 12'
FW	30	Josefina Sruoga		(substituted on) 15'
Manager:
(Argentina) Carlos Retegui

== Awards ==
Player of the Tournament	Top Goalscorer	Goalkeeper of the Tournament
(Netherlands) Maartje Paumen	(Netherlands) Maartje Paumen	(Argentina) Belén Succi
Young Player of the Tournament	Fair Play Trophy	Best Goal
(Netherlands) Willemijn Bos	England	(China) Zhao Yudiao

== Statistics ==
=== Final standings ===
Pos	Team	Pld	W	D	L	GF	GA	GD	Pts	Final standings
1st place, gold medalist(s)	Netherlands	6	4	2	0	12	5	+7	14	Gold Medal
2nd place, silver medalist(s)	Argentina	6	3	2	1	13	9	+4	11	Silver Medal
3rd place, bronze medalist(s)	New Zealand	6	2	1	3	11	13	−2	7	Bronze Medal
4	South Korea	6	1	3	2	12	13	−1	6	
5	England	6	3	2	1	8	5	+3	11	
6	Australia	6	1	1	4	7	13	−6	4	
7	China	6	1	3	2	11	15	−4	6	
8	Germany	6	2	0	4	9	10	−1	6	

Source: FIH

=== Goalscorers ===
There were 83 goals scored in 24 matches, for an average of 3.46 goals per match.

6 goals

- (Netherlands) Maartje Paumen

5 goals

- (China) Zhao Yudiao

4 goals

- (South Korea) Kim Jong-hee

3 goals

- (Argentina) Luciana Aymar
- (Argentina) Daniela Sruoga
- (England) Beckie Herbert
- (South Korea) Kim Jong-eun
- (New Zealand) Katie Glynn
- (New Zealand) Charlotte Harrison

2 goals

- (Argentina) Soledad García
- (Argentina) Delfina Merino
- (Australia) Casey Eastham
- (Australia) Marnie Hudson
- (Australia) Jodie Schulz
- (China) Gao Lihua
- (Germany) Marie Mävers
- (Germany) Julia Müller
- (Germany) Celine Wilde
- (South Korea) Kim Da-rae
- (Netherlands) Kim Lammers
- (Netherlands) Carlijn Welten
- (New Zealand) Cathryn Finlayson
- (New Zealand) Krystal Forgesson

1 goal

- (Argentina) Noel Barrionuevo
- (Argentina) Carla Rebecchi
- (Argentina) Rocío Sánchez Moccia
- (Australia) Jade Close
- (China) Song Qingling
- (China) Li Hongxia
- (China) Mao Weilin
- (China) Sun Sinan
- (England) Alex Danson
- (England) Anne Panter
- (England) Chloe Rogers
- (England) Kate Walsh
- (England) Nicola White
- (Germany) Janine Beermann
- (Germany) Natascha Keller
- (Germany) Maike Stöckel
- (South Korea) Cheon Eun-bi
- (South Korea) Hong Yoo-jin
- (South Korea) Park Mi-hyun
- (Netherlands) Wieke Dijkstra
- (Netherlands) Lidewij Welten
- (New Zealand) Clarissa Eshuis

Source: FIH
