= 2012 Women's Hockey Champions Trophy =

Field hockey tournament

Tournament details
- Host country: Argentina
- City: Rosario
- Teams: 8
- Venue: Estadio Mundialista de Hockey

Final positions
- Champions: Argentina (5th title)
- Runner-up: Great Britain
- Third place: Netherlands

Tournament statistics
- Matches played: 24
- Goals scored: 110 (4.58 per match)
- Top scorer(s): (United Kingdom) Crista Cullen (Japan) Rika Komazawa (South Korea) Lee Seon-ok (5 goals)
- Best player: (Argentina) Luciana Aymar

The 2012 Women's Hockey Champions Trophy was the 20th edition of the Hockey Champions Trophy for women. It was held from 28 January to 5 February 2012 in Rosario, Argentina. This was the last annual edition of the tournament until 2014 when it returned to its original biennial format due to the introduction of the World League.

Argentina won the tournament for the fifth time after defeating Great Britain 1–0 in the final. The Netherlands won the third place match by defeating Germany 5–4.

== Format ==
Another format change was announced. The eight participating teams were split into two groups. After they played a round-robin every team advanced to the knockout stage. From there on, a knockout system was used to determine the winner.

== Qualification ==
A change in the qualification process was decided. Along with the host nation, the top five finishers from the tournament's previous edition and the winner of the 2011 Champions Challenge I qualify automatically. In addition to the two teams nominated by the FIH Executive Board, the following eight teams, competed in this tournament.

- Argentina (Host nation)
- Netherlands (Defending champions)
- New Zealand (Third in 2011 Champions Trophy)
- South Korea (Fourth in 2011 Champions Trophy)
- Great Britain (Fifth in 2011 Champions Trophy as England)
- Japan (Winner of 2011 Champions Challenge I)
- China (Nominated by FIH Executive Board)
- Germany (Nominated by FIH Executive Board)

== Umpires ==
Below are the 10 umpires appointed by the International Hockey Federation:

- Julie Ashton-Lucy (AUS)
- Frances Block (GBR)
- Carolina de la Fuente (ARG)
- Elena Eskina (RUS)
- Kang Hyun-young (KOR)
- Michelle Meister (GER)
- Carol Metchette (IRL)
- Miao Lin (CHN)
- Lesley Pieterse (RSA)
- Wendy Stewart (CAN)

== Results ==
All times are Argentina Time (UTC−03:00)

=== First round ===
==== Pool A ====
Pos	Team	Pld	W	D	L	GF	GA	GD	Pts	Qualification
1	Netherlands	3	2	1	0	9	4	+5	7	Quarter-finals
2	Great Britain	3	2	1	0	8	3	+5	7	Quarter-finals
3	China	3	1	0	2	4	7	−3	3	Quarter-finals
4	Japan	3	0	0	3	2	9	−7	0	Quarter-finals

Source: FIH
Rules for classification: 1) points; 2) goal difference; 3) goals scored; 4) head-to-head result.

28 January 2012
12:30

Netherlands	3–1	China
Welten 37', 64'; Agliotti 69'	Report	Ma Yibo 46'

Umpires:
Julie Ashton-Lucy (AUS)
Lesley Pieterse (RSA)

28 January 2012
15:00

Great Britain	3–0	Japan
Cullen 21'; Richardson 33'; Danson 65'	Report

Umpires:
Carolina de la Fuente (ARG)
Michelle Meister (GER)

29 January 2012
12:30

China	2–1	Japan
Zhao Yudiao 14'; De Jiaojiao 61'	Report	Komazawa 21'

Umpires:
Kang Hyun-young (KOR)
Carol Metchette (IRL)

29 January 2012
15:00

Great Britain	2–2	Netherlands
Cullen 40', 61'	Report	Bos 18'; Lammers 32'

Umpires:
Elena Eskina (RUS)
Wendy Stewart (CAN)

31 January 2012
12:30

Netherlands	4–1	Japan
Lammers 6', 61'; Paumen 8', 44'	Report	Shibata 32'

Umpires:
Michelle Meister (GER)
Lesley Pieterse (RSA)

31 January 2012
15:00

China	1–3	Great Britain
Fu Baorong 48'	Report	Cullen 5', 42'; Ball 53'

Umpires:
Julie Ashton-Lucy (AUS)
Elena Eskina (RUS)

==== Pool B ====
Pos	Team	Pld	W	D	L	GF	GA	GD	Pts	Qualification
1	Germany	3	2	0	1	9	7	+2	6	Quarter-finals
2	Argentina (H)	3	1	2	0	8	6	+2	5	Quarter-finals
3	South Korea	3	0	2	1	6	8	−2	2	Quarter-finals
4	New Zealand	3	0	2	1	5	7	−2	2	Quarter-finals

Source: FIH
Rules for classification: 1) points; 2) goal difference; 3) goals scored; 4) head-to-head result.
(H) Hosts

28 January 2012
17:30

Germany	4–2	South Korea
Schütze 2'; Brockmann 16'; Wilde 33'; Hahn 36'	Report	Cheon Eun-bi 5'; Kim Jong-hee 11'

Umpires:
Frances Block (GBR)
Elena Eskina (RUS)

28 January 2012
20:00

Argentina	2–2	New Zealand
Cavallero 51'; Merino 66'	Report	Michelsen 28'; S. Harrison 49'

Umpires:
Kang Hyun-young (KOR)
Wendy Stewart (CAN)

29 January 2012
17:30

New Zealand	2–2	South Korea
Finlayson 9'; Glynn 25'	Report	Kim Ok-ju 44'; Kim Jong-eun 56'

Umpires:
Carolina de la Fuente (ARG)
Lesley Pieterse (RSA)

29 January 2012
20:00

Germany	2–4	Argentina
Hahn 39'; Krüger 52'	Report	Maccari 15'; Barrionuevo 28'; Rebecchi 32'; J. Sruoga 37'

Umpires:
Julie Ashton-Lucy (AUS)
Miao Lin (CHN)

31 January 2012
17:30

New Zealand	1–3	Germany
Punt 60'	Report	Hasselmann 5', 9'; Hahn 21'

Umpires:
Carolina de la Fuente (ARG)
Miao Lin (CHN)

31 January 2012
20:00

Argentina	2–2	South Korea
Barrionuevo 23'; Aymar 69'	Report	Lee Seon-ok 21', 67'

Umpires:
Frances Block (GBR)
Carol Metchette (IRL)

=== Second round ===
Quarter-finals
2 February 2012
Netherlands	3
New Zealand	2
2 February 2012
Argentina	3
China	2
2 February 2012
Great Britain	4
South Korea	1
2 February 2012
Germany	3
Japan	2

Semi-finals
4 February 2012
Netherlands	2 (0)
Argentina (p.s.o.)	2 (2)
4 February 2012
Great Britain	2
Germany	0

Final
5 February 2012
Argentina	1
Great Britain	0
Third Place Match
5 February 2012
Netherlands	5
Germany	4

==== Quarter-finals ====
2 February 2012
12:30

Netherlands	3–0	New Zealand
Lammers 25'; Paumen 41'; Welten 57'	Report

Umpires:
Carol Metchette (IRL)
Kang Hyun-young (KOR)

2 February 2012
15:00

Germany	3–2	Japan
Hasselmann 7'; Mävers 33'; Wilde 35+'	Report	Murakami 37'; Fujio 44'

Umpires:
Frances Block (GBR)
Wendy Stewart (CAN)

2 February 2012
17:30

Great Britain	4–1	South Korea
Twigg 17'; Danson 20', 22'; Richardson 52'	Report	Lee Seon-ok 31'

Umpires:
Carolina de la Fuente (ARG)
Miao Lin (CHN)

2 February 2012
20:00

Argentina	3–2	China
Barrionuevo 14'; Merino 61'; Luchetti 65'	Report	Ma Yibo 45'; Tang Chunling 62'

Umpires:
Julie Ashton-Lucy (AUS)
Lesley Pieterse (RSA)

==== Fifth to eighth place classification ====
Crossover
3 February 2012
New Zealand (a.e.t)	3
China	2
3 February 2012
South Korea	3
Japan (a.e.t)	4

Fifth Place Match
5 February 2012
New Zealand	3
Japan (a.e.t)	4
Seventh Place Match
5 February 2012
China	3 (2)
South Korea (p.s.o)	3 (3)

===== Crossover =====
3 February 2012
17:30

South Korea	3–4 (a.e.t.)	Japan
Han Hye-lyoung 31'; Lee Seon-ok 34', 64'	Report	Komazawa 3', 68', 83'; Shibata 53'

Umpires:
Wendy Stewart (CAN)
Miao Lin (CHN)

3 February 2012
20:00

New Zealand	3–2 (a.e.t.)	China
Finlayson 60', 67'; Michelsen 77'	Report	Gao Lihua 24'; Song Qingling 41'

Umpires:
Michelle Meister (GER)
Elena Eskina (RUS)

===== Seventh and eighth place =====
5 February 2012
12:30

China	3–3 (a.e.t.)	South Korea
Ma Yibo 7', 12'; Zhao Yudiao 15'	Report	Kim Jong-eun 19'; Hong Yoo-jin 31'; Kim Jong-hee 51'
Penalties
Liang Meiyu (penalty shoot-out scored); Peng Yang (penalty shoot-out missed); Fu Baorong (penalty shoot-out missed); Gao Lihua (penalty shoot-out scored); Zhao Yudiao (penalty shoot-out missed)	2–3	(penalty shoot-out scored) Han Hye-lyoung; (penalty shoot-out scored) Kim Jong-eun; (penalty shoot-out scored) Lee Seon-ok; (penalty shoot-out missed) Park Seon-mi; (penalty shoot-out missed) Cheon Eun-bi

Umpires:
Wendy Stewart (CAN)
Lesley Pieterse (RSA)

===== Fifth and sixth place =====
5 February 2012
15:00

New Zealand	3–4 (a.e.t.)	Japan
Glynn 41', 69'; Michelsen 53'	Report	Shibata 3'; Tanaka 15'; Fujio 59'; Komazawa 78'

Umpires:
Julie Ashton-Lucy (AUS)
Michelle Meister (GER)

==== First to fourth place classification ====
===== Semi-finals =====
4 February 2012
17:30

Great Britain	2–0	Germany
Thomas 29'; Ball 39'	Report

Umpires:
Carol Metchette (IRL)
Carolina de la Fuente (ARG)

4 February 2012
20:00

Netherlands	2–2 (a.e.t.)	Argentina
Paumen 18'; Dirkse van den Heuvel 37'	Report	J. Sruoga 14'; Barrionuevo 69'
Penalties
Agliotti (penalty shoot-out missed); Bos (penalty shoot-out missed); Goderie (penalty shoot-out missed); De Goede (penalty shoot-out missed)	0–2	(penalty shoot-out scored) Sánchez Moccia; (penalty shoot-out scored) Aymar; (penalty shoot-out missed) D'Elía

Umpires:
Frances Block (GBR)
Kang Hyun-young (KOR)

===== Third and fourth place =====
5 February 2012
17:30

Netherlands	5–4	Germany
Goderie 11'; Dirkse van den Heuvel 14'; Welten 17'; Van Male 19'; Agliotti 30'	Report	Stöckel 26'; Keller 27', 54'; Wilde 55'

Umpires:
Carolina de la Fuente (ARG)
Frances Block (GBR)

===== Final =====
5 February 2012
20:00

Argentina	1–0	Great Britain
D'Elía 29'	Report

Estadio Mundialista
Attendance: 12,000
Umpires:
Carol Metchette (IRL)
Kang Hyun-young (KOR)

Team details

Argentina
Great Britain

GK	1	Belén Succi
DF	5	Macarena Rodríguez
DF	25	Silvina D'Elía	14
DF	27	Noel Barrionuevo	31
MF	4	Rosario Luchetti	(yellow card) 49'
MF	8	Luciana Aymar (c)	17
MF	21	Mariela Scarone
MF	17	Rocío Sánchez Moccia
FW	11	Carla Rebecchi
FW	12	Delfina Merino
FW	30	Josefina Sruoga
Substitutions:
FW	14	Martina Cavallero		(substituted on) 11'
	15	Roberta Werthein		(substituted on) 47'
FW	16	Florencia Habif		(substituted on) 10'
MF	18	Daniela Sruoga		(substituted on) 11'
FW	19	Sofía Maccari		(substituted on) 24'
Manager:
(Argentina) Carlos Retegui

GK	1	(England) Beth Storry
DF	3	(Scotland) Emily Maguire
DF	4	(England) Laura Unsworth
DF	5	(England) Crista Cullen
MF	6	(England) Hannah Macleod	(yellow card) 44'
MF	7	(England) Anne Panter
MF	8	(England) Helen Richardson
MF	11	(England) Kate Richardson
MF	22	(England) Ashleigh Ball	9
FW	15	(England) Alex Danson
FW	29	(Wales) Sarah Thomas
Substitutions:
MF	12	(England) Chloe Rogers		(substituted on) 5'
	14	(Scotland) Laura Bartlett		(substituted on) 4'
MF	18	(England) Georgie Twigg		(substituted on) 6'
DF	23	(England) Sally Walton		(substituted on) 14'
FW	28	(England) Nicola White		(substituted on) 4'
Manager:
(England) Danny Kerry

== Awards ==
Top Goalscorers	Player of the Tournament	Goalkeeper of the Tournament	Fair Play Trophy
(United Kingdom) Crista Cullen (Japan) Rika Komazawa (South Korea) Lee Seon-ok	(Argentina) Luciana Aymar	(Argentina) Belén Succi	Germany

== Statistics ==
=== Final standings ===
1. Argentina
2. Great Britain
3. Netherlands
4. Germany
5. Japan
6. New Zealand
7. South Korea
8. China

=== Goalscorers ===
5 goals

- (United Kingdom) Crista Cullen
- (Japan) Rika Komazawa
- (South Korea) Lee Seon-ok

4 goals

- (Argentina) Noel Barrionuevo
- (China) Ma Yibo
- (Netherlands) Kim Lammers
- (Netherlands) Maartje Paumen
- (Netherlands) Lidewij Welten

3 goals

- (Germany) Nina Hasselmann
- (Germany) Celine Wilde
- (Germany) Lisa Hahn
- (United Kingdom) Alex Danson
- (Japan) Akane Shibata
- (New Zealand) Cathryn Finlayson
- (New Zealand) Katie Glynn
- (New Zealand) Stacey Michelsen

2 goals

- (Argentina) Delfina Merino
- (Argentina) Josefina Sruoga
- (China) Zhao Yudiao
- (Germany) Natascha Keller
- (United Kingdom) Ashleigh Ball
- (United Kingdom) Helen Richardson
- (Japan) Kaori Fujio
- (South Korea) Kim Jong-eun
- (South Korea) Kim Jong-hee
- (Netherlands) Marilyn Agliotti
- (Netherlands) Carlien Dirkse van den Heuvel

1 goal

- (Argentina) Luciana Aymar
- (Argentina) Martina Cavallero
- (Argentina) Silvina D'Elía
- (Argentina) Rosario Luchetti
- (Argentina) Sofía Maccari
- (Argentina) Carla Rebecchi
- (China) De Jiaojiao
- (China) Fu Baorong
- (China) Gao Lihua
- (China) Song Qingling
- (China) Tang Chunling
- (Germany) Anke Brockmann
- (Germany) Hannah Krüger
- (Germany) Marie Mävers
- (Germany) Christina Schütze
- (Germany) Maike Stöckel
- (United Kingdom) Sarah Thomas
- (United Kingdom) Georgie Twigg
- (Japan) Ai Murakami
- (Japan) Izuki Tanaka
- (South Korea) Cheon Eun-bi
- (South Korea) Han Hye-lyoung
- (South Korea) Hong Yoo-jin
- (South Korea) Kim Ok-ju
- (Netherlands) Maartje Goderie
- (Netherlands) Naomi van As
- (Netherlands) Kitty van Male
- (New Zealand) Samantha Harrison
- (New Zealand) Anita Punt
