= FIH All-Star Teams =

The FIH All-Star Teams are a group of selected players and coaches chosen every year after the recommendations and opinions of field hockey players, officials, coaches and journalists. These players are considered to have given their best during the year in every competition and contributed in some way to improve the sport itself. This award is given by the International Hockey Federation since the year 2006 both in men and women's category.

== Men's ==
=== 2006 ===
Goalkeepers	Defenders	Midfielders	Forwards	Coaches
(Australia) Stephen Mowlam (Germany) Ulrich Bubolz	(Australia) Bevan George (England) Richard Mantell (Germany) Philipp Crone (Pakistan) Rehan Butt (Netherlands) Taeke Taekema (New Zealand) Hayden Shaw	(Australia) Brent Livermore (Germany) Tibor Weißenborn (South Korea) Kim Yong-Bae (Netherlands) Teun de Nooijer (Netherlands) Jeroen Delmee	(Australia) Jamie Dwyer (Germany) Christopher Zeller (Pakistan) Shakeel Abbasi (Spain) Pol Amat (Spain) Santi Freixa	(Australia) Barry Dancer (Germany) Bernhard Peters

== Women's ==
=== 2006 ===
Goalkeepers	Defenders	Midfielders	Forwards	Coaches
(Spain) María Jesús Rosa (United States) Amy Tran	(Argentina) Magdalena Aicega (Australia) Angie Skirving (England) Crista Cullen (Japan) Akemi Kato (Netherlands) Minke Booij (Netherlands) Janneke Schopman	(Argentina) Luciana Aymar (Germany) Fanny Rinne (South Korea) Park Mi-Hyun (Netherlands) Miek van Geenhuizen (Spain) Silvia Muñoz	(Australia) Nikki Hudson (China) Fu Baorong (Germany) Natascha Keller (Japan) Kaori Chiba (Netherlands) Sylvia Karres	(Australia) Frank Murray (Netherlands) Marc Lammers

=== 2007 ===
Goalkeepers	Defenders	Midfielders	Forwards	Coaches
(Spain) María Jesús Rosa (United States) Amy Tran	(Argentina) Magdalena Aicega (China) Ma Yibo (England) Crista Cullen (Germany) Tina Bachmann (Netherlands) Minke Booij (Netherlands) Janneke Schopman	(Argentina) Luciana Aymar (Australia) Madonna Blyth (Germany) Fanny Rinne (Netherlands) Maartje Goderie (South Africa) Marsha Marescia	(Australia) Peta Gallagher (Germany) Maike Stöckel (Japan) Kaori Chiba (South Korea) Park Mi-Hyun (Netherlands) Marilyn Agliotti	(Germany) Michael Behrmann (Netherlands) Marc Lammers

=== 2008 ===
Goalkeepers	Defenders	Midfielders	Forwards	Coaches
(Australia) Rachel Imison (Spain) María Jesús Rosa	(China) Ma Yibo (Germany) Tina Bachmann (Netherlands) Minke Booij (Netherlands) Maartje Paumen (Netherlands) Janneke Schopman	(Argentina) Luciana Aymar (Australia) Melanie Wells (China) Song Qingling (Germany) Fanny Rinne (South Korea) Lee Seon-Ok	(Argentina) Alejandra Gulla (Argentina) Carla Rebecchi (China) Fu Baorong (Germany) Natascha Keller (Japan) Kaori Chiba (Netherlands) Naomi van As	(China) Kim Chang-Back (Netherlands) Marc Lammers

=== 2009 ===
Goalkeepers	Defenders	Midfielders	Forwards	Coaches
(Argentina) Belén Succi (Australia) Toni Cronk	(Argentina) Noel Barrionuevo (China) Ma Yibo (Germany) Tina Bachmann (Netherlands) Maartje Paumen (Netherlands) Janneke Schopman	(Argentina) Luciana Aymar (Australia) Madonna Blyth (Australia) Casey Eastham (England) Helen Richardson (Japan) Miyuki Nakagawa (South Africa) Marsha Marescia	(China) Fu Baorong (Germany) Natascha Keller (India) Surinder Kaur (Netherlands) Naomi van As (New Zealand) Gemma Flynn	(Argentina) Carlos Retegui (Australia) Frank Murray

=== 2010 ===
Goalkeepers	Defenders	Midfielders	Forwards	Coaches
(England) Beth Storry (Netherlands) Joyce Sombroek	(Argentina) Noel Barrionuevo (England) Crista Cullen (Netherlands) Maartje Paumen	(Argentina) Luciana Aymar (Australia) Madonna Blyth (Australia) Casey Eastham (England) Helen Richardson (New Zealand) Kayla Sharland (South Africa) Marsha Marescia	(Argentina) Soledad García (Argentina) Carla Rebecchi (China) Fu Baorong (China) Zhao Yudiao (Germany) Natascha Keller (India) Rani Rampal (Netherlands) Naomi van As	(Argentina) Carlos Retegui (England) Danny Kerry

=== 2011 ===
Goalkeepers	Defenders	Midfielders	Forwards	Coaches
(Germany) Yvonne Frank (Netherlands) Joyce Sombroek	(Argentina) Noel Barrionuevo (Australia) Kobie McGurk (Germany) Julia Müller (Netherlands) Willemijn Bos (Netherlands) Maartje Paumen	(Argentina) Luciana Aymar (England) Helen Richardson (United States) Katelyn Falgowski	(Argentina) Soledad García (Argentina) Carla Rebecchi (England) Alex Danson (Germany) Natascha Keller (South Korea) Kim Da-Rae (New Zealand) Gemma Flynn (New Zealand) Anita Punt (South Africa) Pietie Coetzee	(Netherlands) Max Caldas (New Zealand) Mark Hager
