= Nagisa Hayashi =

Japanese field hockey player (born 1986)

Medal record

Women's field hockey

Representing Japan

Asian Games
Bronze medal – third place	2010 Guangzhou	Team

Asian Champions Trophy
Silver medal – second place	2010 Busan	
Bronze medal – third place	2011 Ordos	

Nagisa Hayashi (林 なぎさ, Hayashi Nagisa; born 29 August 1986) is a Japanese field hockey player. At the 2012 Summer Olympics she competed with the Japan women's national field hockey team in the women's tournament.
