= 2010 Women's Hockey Champions Trophy =

Tournament details
- Host country: England
- City: Nottingham
- Teams: 6
- Venue: Highfields Sports Club

Final positions
- Champions: Argentina (4th title)
- Runner-up: Netherlands
- Third place: England

Tournament statistics
- Matches played: 18
- Goals scored: 75 (4.17 per match)
- Top scorer: (Argentina) Noel Barrionuevo (8 goals)
- Best player: (Argentina) Luciana Aymar

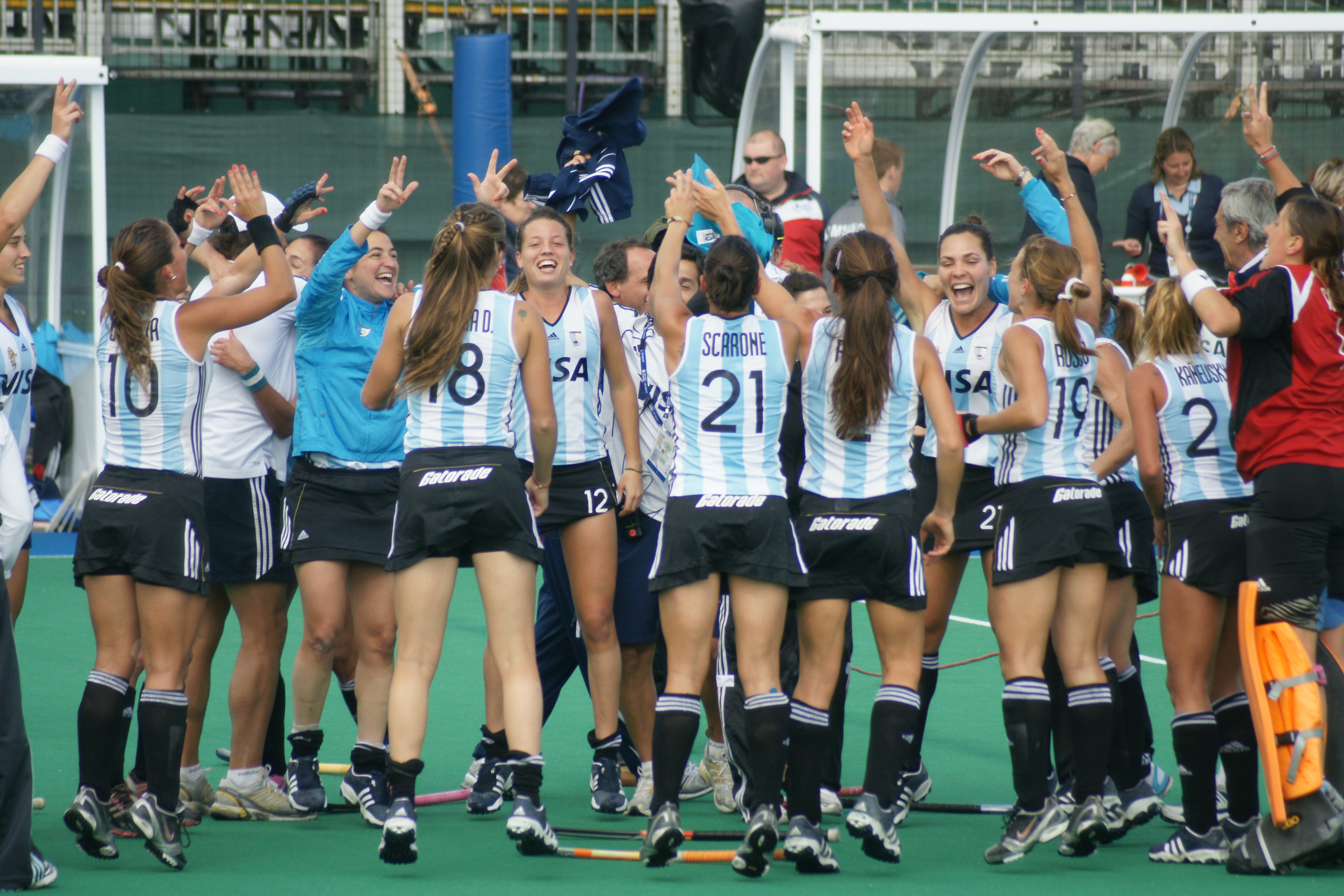
Argentina, champions

The 2010 Women's Hockey Champions Trophy was the 18th edition of the Hockey Champions Trophy for women. It was held between 10–18 July 2010 in Nottingham, England.

Argentina won the tournament for the fourth time after defeating the Netherlands 4–2 in the final.

== Teams ==
Below are the teams qualified for the tournament, as listed by International Hockey Federation (FIH):

- Argentina (Defending champions)
- Netherlands (Champions of 2008 Summer Olympics and champions of 2006 World Cup)
- England (Host nation)
- New Zealand (Winner of 2009 Champions Challenge I)
- China (Second in 2008 Summer Olympics)
- Germany (Fourth in 2008 Summer Olympics)

== Umpires ==
Below are the 8 umpires appointed by the International Hockey Federation:

- Frances Block (ENG)
- Elena Eskina (RUS)
- Amy Hassick (USA)
- Soledad Iparraguirre (ARG)
- Michelle Joubert (RSA)
- Lee Keum-ju (KOR)
- Miao Lin (CHN)
- Lisa Roach (AUS)

== Results ==
All times are British Summer Time (UTC+01:00)

=== Pool ===
| Pos | Team | Pld | W | D | L | GF | GA | GD | Pts | Qualification |
|---|---|---|---|---|---|---|---|---|---|---|
| 1 | Netherlands | 5 | 4 | 0 | 1 | 11 | 6 | +5 | 12 | Final |
| 2 | Argentina | 5 | 3 | 1 | 1 | 15 | 9 | +6 | 10 | Final |
| 3 | England | 5 | 3 | 1 | 1 | 8 | 8 | 0 | 10 | |
| 4 | Germany | 5 | 2 | 1 | 2 | 10 | 8 | +2 | 7 | |
| 5 | China | 5 | 1 | 0 | 4 | 9 | 11 | −2 | 3 | |
| 6 | New Zealand | 5 | 0 | 1 | 4 | 6 | 17 | −11 | 1 | |

Source: FIH
Rules for classification: 1) points; 2) goal difference; 3) goals scored; 4) head-to-head result.

10 July 2010
11:05

| China | 1–2 | Germany |
|---|---|---|
| Xu 9' | Report | Hoffmann 17', 54' |

Umpires:
Lee Keum-ju (KOR)
Soledad Iparraguirre (ARG)

10 July 2010
14:05

| Argentina | 1–2 | England |
|---|---|---|
| Barrionuevo 55' | Report | MacLeod 12'; Danson 53' |

Umpires:
Michelle Joubert (RSA)
Lisa Roach (AUS)

10 July 2010
16:35

| Netherlands | 3–1 | New Zealand |
|---|---|---|
| De Goede 50'; Paumen 66'; Lammers 70' | Report | Eshuis 48' |

Umpires:
Frances Block (ENG)
Miao Lin (CHN)

11 July 2010
13:35

| Germany | 2–2 | Argentina |
|---|---|---|
| Keller 21'; Bachmann 59' | Report | Rossi 41'; Barrionuevo 43' |

Umpires:
Frances Block (ENG)
Miao Lin (CHN)

11 July 2010
16:05

| England | 0–3 | Netherlands |
|---|---|---|
| | Report | Hoog 23'; Jonker 31'; De Goede 66' |

Umpires:
Soledad Iparraguirre (ARG)
Elena Eskina (RUS)

11 July 2010
18:35

| New Zealand | 1–3 | China |
|---|---|---|
| C. Harrison 68' | Report | Fu 10', 63'; Song 50' |

Umpires:
Amy Hassick (USA)
Lisa Roach (AUS)

13 July 2010
11:05

| Argentina | 4–0 | New Zealand |
|---|---|---|
| Merino 42'; Barrionuevo 54'; Aymar 65'; D. Sruoga 68' | Report |

Umpires:
Michelle Joubert (RSA)
Elena Eskina (RUS)

13 July 2010
13:35

| England | 2–1 | Germany |
|---|---|---|
| Richardson 24', 63' | Report | Keller 60' |

Umpires:
Amy Hassick (USA)
Lee Keum-ju (KOR)

13 July 2010
16:05

| Netherlands | 2–1 | China |
|---|---|---|
| Paumen 43', 59' | Report | Fu 5' |

Umpires:
Soledad Iparraguirre (ARG)
Frances Block (ENG)

15 July 2010
11:05

| Germany | 5–2 | New Zealand |
|---|---|---|
| Hoffmann 12', 31'; Otte 20'; Stöckel 54'; Keller 58' | Report | Glynn 63'; S. Harrison 67' |

Umpires:
Frances Block (ENG)
Miao Lin (CHN)

15 July 2010
13:35

| China | 1–2 | England |
|---|---|---|
| Ma Y. 12' | Report | Richardson 45'; Craddock 52' |

Umpires:
Michelle Joubert (RSA)
Soledad Iparraguirre (ARG)

15 July 2010
16:05

| Argentina | 4–2 | Netherlands |
|---|---|---|
| Barrionuevo 6'; Merino 32'; Rebecchi 47'; Luchetti 54' | Report | Agliotti 9'; Paumen 23' |

Umpires:
Amy Hassick (USA)
Lisa Roach (AUS)

17 July 2010
10:05

| Netherlands | 1–0 | Germany |
|---|---|---|
| Lammers 50' | Report |

Umpires:
Soledad Iparraguirre (ARG)
Elena Eskina (RUS)

17 July 2010
12:35

| New Zealand | 2–2 | England |
|---|---|---|
| Hamahona 9'; Flynn 18' | Report | White 19'; Cullen 31' |

Umpires:
Lisa Roach (AUS)
Michelle Joubert (RSA)

17 July 2010
15:05

| China | 3–4 | Argentina |
|---|---|---|
| Wang Z. 30'; Zhao 60'; Fu 64' | Report | D. Sruoga 20'; D'Elía 45'; Luchetti 49'; Barrionuevo 69' |

Umpires:
Frances Block (ENG)
Lee Keum-ju (KOR)

=== Classification ===
==== Fifth and sixth place ====
18 July 2010
09:35

| China | 3–4 | New Zealand |
|---|---|---|
| Ma Y. 9', 44'; Zhao 22' | Report | C. Harrison 12'; Glynn 39'; Hamahona 58'; Flynn 62' |

Umpires:
Lee Keum-ju (KOR)
Amy Hassick (USA)

==== Third and fourth place ====
18 July 2010
12:15

| England | 2–1 | Germany |
|---|---|---|
| Gilbert 43'; Cullen 51' | Report | Stöckel 9' |

Umpires:
Michelle Joubert (RSA)
Soledad Iparraguirre (ARG)

==== Final ====
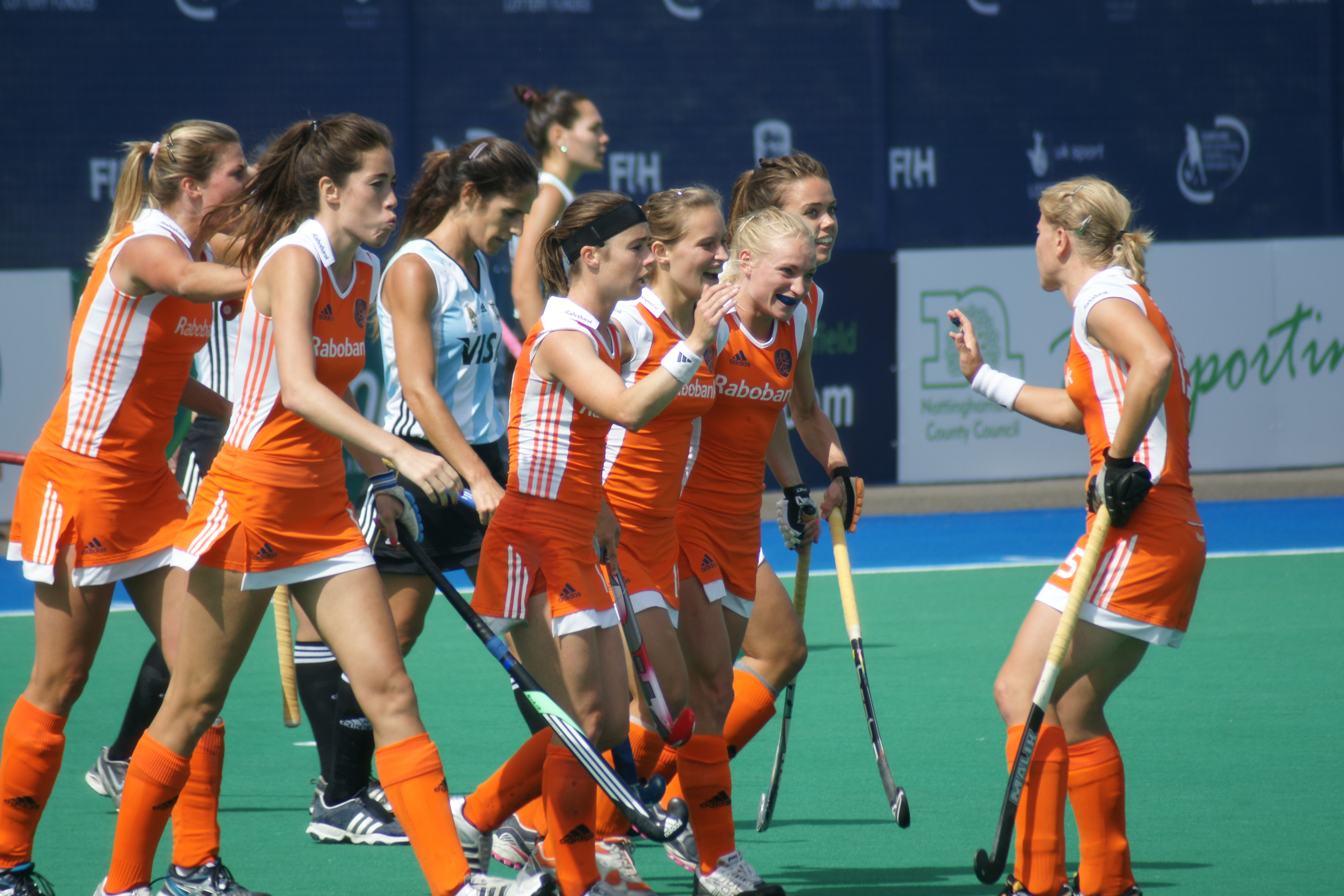
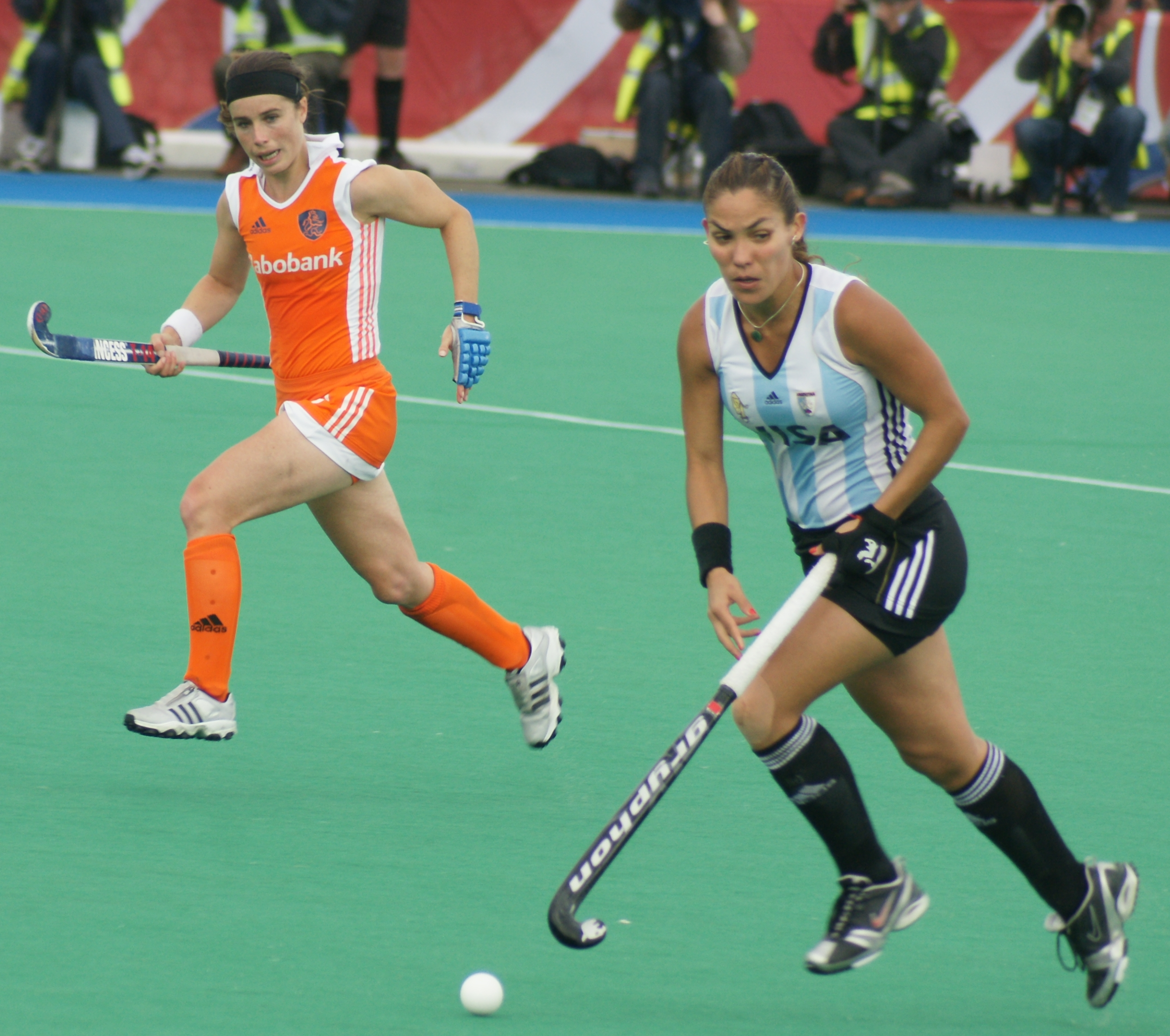
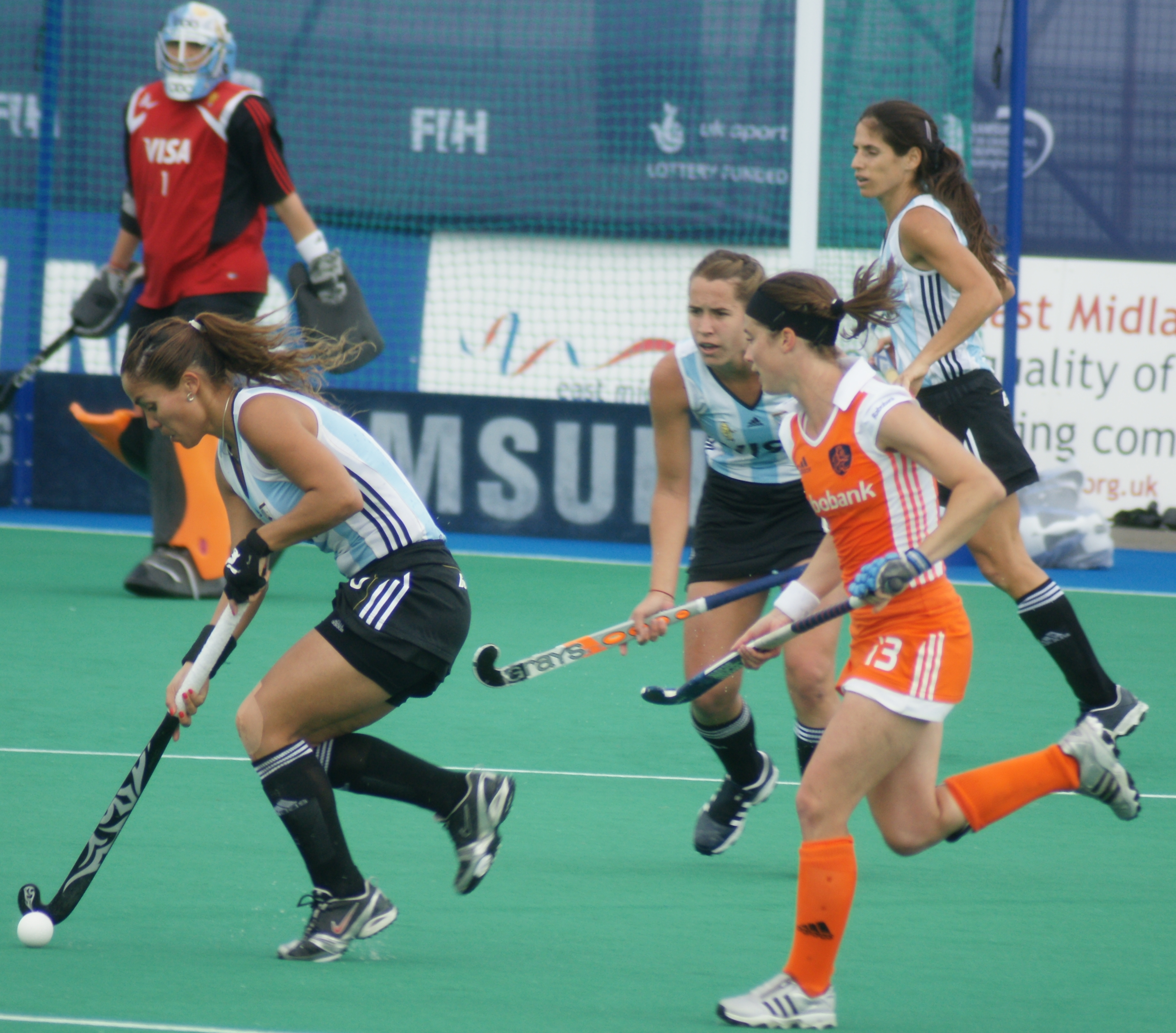
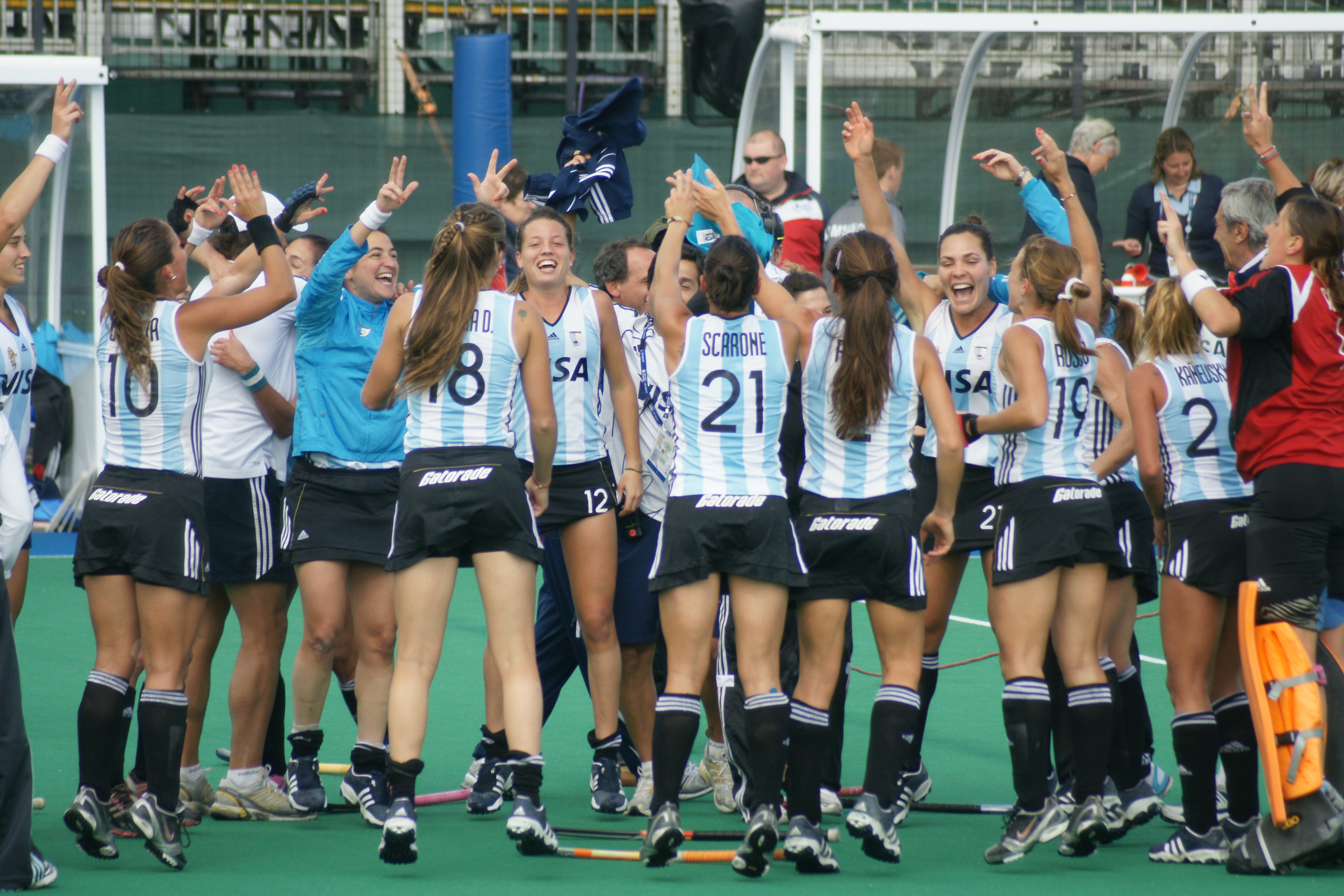
Some moments of the final

18 July 2010
15:05

| Netherlands | 2–4 | Argentina |
|---|---|---|
| Jonker 18'; Goderie 56' | Report | Barrionuevo 9', 30', 68'; Rebecchi 26' |

Umpires:
Frances Block (ENG)
Lisa Roach (AUS)

Team details

Argentina
Netherlands

| GK | 1 | Belén Succi |
| DF | 2 | Mariana Rossi |
| DF | 5 | Macarena Rodríguez |
| DF | 25 | Silvina D'Elía |
| DF | 26 | Giselle Kañevsky |
| DF | 27 | Noel Barrionuevo |
| MF | 4 | Rosario Luchetti |
| MF | 8 | Luciana Aymar (c) |
| MF | 21 | Mariela Scarone |
| FW | 10 | Soledad García |
| FW | 11 | Carla Rebecchi |
Substitutions:
| FW | 7 | Alejandra Gulla | (substituted on) 13' |
| FW | 12 | Delfina Merino | (substituted on) 12' |
| MF | 18 | Daniela Sruoga | (substituted on) 16' |
| MF | 19 | Mariné Russo | (substituted on) 13' |
| | 30 | María Sruoga | (substituted on) 12' |
Manager:
(Argentina) Carlos Retegui

| GK | 1 | Floortje Engels |
| DF | 15 | Janneke Schopman (c) |
| DF | 21 | Sophie Polkamp |
| MF | 9 | Wieke Dijkstra |
| MF | 13 | Minke Smeets |
| MF | 18 | Naomi van As |
| MF | 19 | Ellen Hoog |
| MF | 24 | Eva de Goede |
| MF | 27 | Marilyn Agliotti |
| FW | 12 | Lidewij Welten |
| FW | 17 | Maartje Paumen |
Substitutions:
| MF | 8 | Marieke Mattheussens | (substituted on) 47' |
| FW | 10 | Kelly Jonker | (substituted on) 15' |
| | 11 | Maartje Goderie | (substituted on) 9' |
| | 23 | Kim Lammers | (substituted on) 9' |
| | 26 | Michelle van der Pols | (substituted on) 12' |
Manager:
(Netherlands) Herman Kruis

== Awards ==
| Top Goalscorer | Player of the Tournament | Goalkeeper of the Tournament |
|---|---|---|
| (Argentina) Noel Barrionuevo | (Argentina) Luciana Aymar | (England) Beth Storry |

== Statistics ==
=== Final standings ===
1. Argentina
2. Netherlands
3. England
4. Germany
5. New Zealand
6. China

=== Goalscorers ===
There were 75 goals scored in 18 matches, for an average of 4.17 goals per match.

8 goals

- (Argentina) Noel Barrionuevo

4 goals

- (China) Fu Baorong
- (Germany) Eileen Hoffmann
- (Netherlands) Maartje Paumen

3 goals

- (China) Ma Yibo
- (England) Helen Richardson
- (Germany) Natascha Keller

2 goals

- (Argentina) Rosario Luchetti
- (Argentina) Delfina Merino
- (Argentina) Carla Rebecchi
- (Argentina) Daniela Sruoga
- (China) Zhao Yudiao
- (England) Crista Cullen
- (Germany) Maike Stöckel
- (Netherlands) Eva de Goede
- (Netherlands) Kelly Jonker
- (Netherlands) Kim Lammers
- (New Zealand) Gemma Flynn
- (New Zealand) Katie Glynn
- (New Zealand) Piki Hamahona
- (New Zealand) Charlotte Harrison

1 goal

- (Argentina) Luciana Aymar
- (Argentina) Silvina D'Elía
- (Argentina) Mariana Rossi
- (China) Song Qingling
- (China) Wang Zhishuang
- (China) Xu Xiaoxu
- (England) Charlotte Craddock
- (England) Alex Danson
- (England) Susie Gilbert
- (England) Hannah MacLeod
- (England) Nicola White
- (Germany) Mandy Haase
- (Germany) Katharina Otte
- (Netherlands) Marilyn Agliotti
- (Netherlands) Maartje Goderie
- (Netherlands) Ellen Hoog
- (New Zealand) Clarissa Eshuis
- (New Zealand) Samantha Harrison

Source: FIH
