= Sakiyo Asano =

Japanese field hockey player

Medal record

Women's field hockey

Representing Japan

Asian Games
Bronze medal – third place	2010 Guangzhou	Team

Asian Champions Trophy
Silver medal – second place	2010 Busan	
Bronze medal – third place	2011 Ordos	

Sakiyo Asano (浅野 祥代, Asano Sakiyo; born 26 May 1987 in Kagamihara, Gifu, Japan) is a Japanese field hockey player. She competed with the Japan women's national field hockey team in the women's tournament at the 2012 Summer Olympics.
