= Li Dongxiao =

Chinese field hockey player

Personal information
- Born: November 26, 1987 (age 38) Changchun, Jilin, China
Medal record
Women's field hockey
Representing China
Asian Games
Gold medal – first place	2010 Guangzhou	Team
Silver medal – second place	2014 Incheon	Team
Asian Champions Trophy
Silver medal – second place	2011 Ordos
Bronze medal – third place	2018 Donghae

Li Dongxiao (born November 26, 1987) is a Chinese field hockey player. She competed for the China women's national field hockey team at the 2016 Summer Olympics.

She won a silver medal as a member of the Chinese team at 2014 Asian Games.
