= Gim Sung-hee =

South Korean hockey player

Personal information
- Nationality: South Korean
- Born: 3 April 1983 (age 43)

Sport
- Sport: Field hockey
Medal record
Women's field hockey
Representing South Korea
Asian Games
Silver medal – second place	2010 Guangzhou	Team
Asian Champions Trophy
Gold medal – first place	2010 Busan
Gold medal – first place	2011 Ordos

Gim Sung-hee (born 3 April 1983) is a South Korean former field hockey player. She competed in the women's tournament at the 2008 Summer Olympics.
