= Jeon Yu-mi =

South Korean field hockey player (born 1988)

Medal record

Women's field hockey

Representing South Korea

Asian Games
Silver medal – second place	2010 Guangzhou	Team

Asian Champions Trophy
Gold medal – first place	2010 Busan	

Jeon Yu-Mi (born 11 November 1988 in Seoul) is a South Korean field hockey player. At the 2012 Summer Olympics she competed with the Korea women's national field hockey team in the women's tournament. She was part of the Korean team that won the women's hockey at the 2010 Asian Games.
