= Jang Soo-ji =

South Korean field hockey player

Medal record

Women's field hockey

Representing South Korea

Asian Games
Gold medal – first place	2014 Incheon	Team
Silver medal – second place	2010 Guangzhou	Team

Asian Cup
Bronze medal – third place	2017 Gifu	Team

Asian Champions Trophy
Gold medal – first place	2010 Busan	
Gold medal – first place	2011 Ordos	

Jang Soo-ji (Korean: 장수지; born 21 November 1987) is a South Korean field hockey player. At the 2012 Summer Olympics she competed with the Korea women's national field hockey team in the women's tournament.

She was born in Seoul, South Korea.

She competed in three Asian Games from 2006 to 2014, winning a silver medal at the 2010 Asian Games and a gold medal at 2014 Asian Games.
