= Mie Nakashima =

Japanese field hockey player (born 1986)

Medal record

Women's field hockey

Representing Japan

Asian Games
Bronze medal – third place	2010 Guangzhou	Team

Asian Champions Trophy
Silver medal – second place	2010 Busan	

Mie Nakashima (中島 史恵, Nakashima Mie; born June 18, 1986) is a Japanese field hockey player. She competed for the Japan women's national field hockey team at the 2016 Summer Olympics.
