= Keiko Manabe =

Japanese field hockey player

Medal record

Women's field hockey

Representing Japan

Asian Games
Bronze medal – third place	2010 Guangzhou	Team

Asian Champions Trophy
Gold medal – first place	2013 Kakamigahara	
Bronze medal – third place	2011 Ordos	

Keiko Manabe (真鍋 敬子, Manabe Keiko; born 11 March 1987, Kani, Gifu) is a Japanese field hockey player. At the 2012 Summer Olympics she competed with the Japan women's national field hockey team in the women's tournament.
