= Field hockey at the 2010 Asian Games – Women's tournament =

Women's field hockey tournament at the 2010 Asian Games
Tournament details
- Host country: China
- City: Guangzhou
- Dates: 13–24 November 2010
- Teams: 8
- Venue: Aoti Hockey Field

Medalists
gold medal	China
silver medal	South Korea
bronze medal	Japan

Tournament statistics
- Matches played: 24
- Goals scored: 124 (5.17 per match)
- Top scorer: 5 Players (see list below) (7 goals)

The women's field hockey at the 2010 Asian Games was held in Guangzhou from 13 November to 24 November 2010 at the Aoti Hockey Field.

China won the tournament for the third time after defeating South Korea 5–4 in a penalty shoot-out after the final finished as a 0–0 draw.

== Officials ==
The following umpires were appointed by the FIH and AHF to officiate the tournament:

- Mercedes Sánchez (ARG)
- Chen Hong (CHN)
- Miao Lin (CHN)
- Christiane Hippler (GER)
- Kitty Yau (HKG)
- Anupama Puchimanda (IND)
- Nor Piza Hassan (MAS)
- Miskarmalia Mohd Ariffin (SGP)
- Lynn Hassan (SGP)
- Lesley Nunn (RSA)
- Kang Hyun-young (KOR)

== Squads ==
China
- Ma Yibo
- Huang Xuejiao
- Ma Wei
- Sun Sinan
- Fu Baorong
- Li Shuang
- Gao Lihua
- Wang Zhishuang
- Zhang Yimeng
- Li Hongxia
- Ren Ye
- Zhao Yudiao
- Song Qingling
- De Jiaojiao
- Xu Xiaoxu
- Li Dongxiao
India
- Dipika Murthy
- Binita Toppo
- Chanchan Devi Thokchom
- Surinder Kaur
- Poonam Rani
- Yogita Bali
- Ritu Rani
- Deepika Thakur
- Jasjeet Kaur Handa
- Mukta Prava Barla
- Rosalind Ralte
- Saba Anjum Karim
- Joydeep Kaur
- Kirandeep Kaur
- Rani Rampal
- Subhadra Pradhan
Japan
- Sakiyo Asano
- Keiko Miura
- Akemi Kato
- Ai Murakami
- Miyuki Nakagawa
- Keiko Manabe
- Yukari Yamamoto
- Mie Nakashima
- Rika Komazawa
- Kaori Chiba
- Nagisa Hayashi
- Mazuki Arai
- Kana Nagayama
- Mayumi Ono
- Aki Mitsuhashi
- Shiho Otsuka
Kazakhstan
- Alessya Pyotukh
- Viktoriya Shaimardanova
- Natalya Sazontova
- Olga Zhizhina
- Anastassiya Chsherbakova
- Aigerim Makhanova
- Yelena Svirskaya
- Vera Domashneva
- Gulnara Imangaliyeva
- Yuliya Mikheichik
- Alissa Chepkassova
- Irina Dobrioglo
- Natalya Gataulina
- Mariya Tussubzhanova
- Galiya Baissarina
- Aliya Mukhambetova
Malaysia
- Farah Ayuni Yahya
- Fazilla Sylvester Silin
- Sebah Kari
- Noor Hasliza
- Rabiatul Adawiyah
- Siti Noor Amarina Ruhaini
- Juliani Mohd Din
- Norfaraha Hashim
- Catherine Lambor
- Norhasikin Halim
- Norazlin Sumantri
- Nuraini Abdul Rashid
- Nadia Abdul Rahman
- Norbaini Hashim
- Siti Noor Hafiza Zainordin
- Nor Hidayah Ahmad Bokhari
South Korea
- Moon Young-hui
- Kim Young-ran
- Kim Bo-mi
- Park Seon-mi
- Lee Seon-ok
- Kim Jong-hee
- Park Mi-hyun
- Kim Jong-eun
- Kim Da-rae
- Cheon Seul-ki
- Jeon Yu-mi
- Gim Sung-hee
- Jang Soo-ji
- Kim Ok-ju
- Kim Eun-sil
- Park Ki-ju
Thailand
- Jesdaporn Tongsun
- Thanittha Chuangmanichot
- Theeranan Taengnim
- Benchamas Yuenyong
- Tikhamporn Sakunpithak
- Kannika Lewrungrot
- Phannipha Phanin
- Supannee Yimnual
- Sukanya Ritngam
- Boonta Duangurai
- Ratanaporn Shongpranam
- Sairung Juwong
- Ratsamee Jaturonratsamee
- Baifurn Chaisokchuek
- Kamolrat Thongkanarak
- Duangrut Chantaruck

== Results ==
All times are China Standard Time (UTC+08:00).

=== Preliminary round ===
Pos	Team	Pld	W	D	L	GF	GA	GD	Pts	Qualification
1	China	6	5	1	0	31	4	+27	16	Gold-medal match
2	South Korea	6	5	1	0	24	5	+19	16	Gold-medal match
3	Japan	6	4	0	2	21	7	+14	12	Bronze-medal match
4	India	6	3	0	3	24	6	+18	9	Bronze-medal match
5	Malaysia	6	2	0	4	12	18	−6	6	Fifth-place match
6	Thailand	6	1	0	5	5	44	−39	3	Fifth-place match
7	Kazakhstan	6	0	0	6	3	36	−33	0	

Source: Guangzhou2010
Rules for classification: 1) points; 2) goal difference; 3) goals scored; 4) head-to-head result.

==== Pool matches ====
13 November 2010
15:30

Japan	5–0	Kazakhstan
Murakami 10', 29'; Mitsuhashi 17'; Nakashima 21'	AWARDED	Domashneva 65'

Umpires:
Kang Hyun-young (KOR)
Miskarmalia Mohd Ariffin (SGP)

13 November 2010
17:30

South Korea	5–0	Thailand
Kim E. 13'; Park M. 40', 66'; Cheon 54', 68'

Umpires:
Lynn Hassan (SGP)
Christiane Hippler (GER)

13 November 2010
19:30

India	4–0	Malaysia
Chanchan 26'; Deepika 43'; Rani 53'; Surinder 67'

Umpires:
Miao Lin (CHN)
Lesley Nunn (RSA)

14 November 2010
15:30

South Korea	10–3	Kazakhstan
Kim B. 4'; Lee 24', 30', 35', 36', 40', 50'; Park M. 56', 69'; Kim Jong-E. 66'		Chsherbakova 21', 39'; Mikheichik 64'

Umpires:
Nor Piza Hassan (MAS)
Kitty Yau (HKG)

14 November 2010
17:30

Japan	4–2	Malaysia
Chiba 3', 63'; Murakami 12'; Nakagawa 68'		Noor 55'; Norfaraha 61'

Umpires:
Chen Hong (CHN)
Mercedes Sánchez (ARG)

14 November 2010
19:30

China	13–0	Thailand
Ma Y. 4', 11', 43', 47'; Zhao 7', 22'; Song 24', 50'; Gao 26'; Wang 28'; De. 32'; Xu 60'; Sun 63'

Umpires:
Kim Jung-hee (KOR)
Anupama Puchimanda (IND)

16 November 2010
13:00

Japan	3–0	India
Nakagawa 10'; Chiba 31'; Arai 69'

Umpires:
Christiane Hippler (GER)
Miao Lin (CHN)

16 November 2010
14:30

South Korea	4–0	Malaysia
Park M. 27'; Cheon 39'; Kim E. 49'; Lee 67'

Umpires:
Mercedes Sánchez (ARG)
Lesley Nunn (RSA)

16 November 2010
15:00

China	5–0	Kazakhstan
Ma Y. 2'; Zhao 11'; Song 19'	AWARDED

Umpires:
Nor Piza Hassan (MAS)
Miskarmalia Mohd Ariffin (SGP)

17 November 2010
14:30

South Korea	1–0	India
Kim Jong-H. 8'

Umpires:
Mercedes Sánchez (ARG)
Chen Hong (CHN)

17 November 2010
18:00

Kazakhstan	0–5	Thailand
Chsherbakova 5', 12', 43'	AWARDED

Umpires:
Kang Hyun-young (KOR)
Kitty Yau (HKG)

17 November 2010
20:00

China	6–0	Malaysia
Zhao 16', 44'; Ren 30'; Fu 35'; Xu 55'; Ma W. 70'

Umpires:
Kim Jung-hee (KOR)
Anupama Puchimada (IND)

19 November 2010
13:00

India	13–0	Thailand
Chanchan 12'; Saba 15'; Rani 20', 42', 66'; Subhadra 24', 57'; Surinder 28', 31', 60', 63'; Poonam 34'; Joydeep 65'

Umpires:
Lynn Hassan (SGP)
Lesley Nunn (RSA)

19 November 2010
14:30

Malaysia	5–0	Kazakhstan
Norazlin 17', 66'; Nadia 41'; Fazilla 56'	AWARDED

Umpires:
Kim Jung-hee (KOR)
Miao Lin (CHN)

19 November 2010
15:00

China	3–1	Japan
Zhao 11', 26'; Gao 14'		Murakami 53'

Umpires:
Christiane Hippler (GER)
Kang Hyun-young (KOR)

20 November 2010
14:30

Japan	8–0	Thailand
Mistsuhashi 20'; Otsuka 32'; Yamamoto 45', 49'; Arai 56'; Murakami 63'; Chiba 68', 69'

Umpires:
Nor Piza Hassan (MAS)
Kitty Yau (HKG)

20 November 2010
18:00

India	6–0	Kazakhstan
Rani 24', 44', 70'; Jasjeet 40'; Surinder 54'; Saba 66'

Umpires:
Chen Hong (CHN)
Miskarmalia Mohd Ariffin (SGP)

20 November 2010
20:00

China	2–2	South Korea
Fu 36', 46'		Park M. 10', 62'

Umpires:
Christiane Hippler (GER)
Mercedes Sánchez (ARG)

22 November 2010
15:30

Malaysia	5–0	Thailand
Siti 24'; Hidayah 32', 70'; Norfaraha 33'; Norazlin 37'

Umpires:
Anupama Puchimanda (IND)
Lynn Hassan (SGP)

22 November 2010
17:30

South Korea	2–0	Japan
Kim Jong-E. 41', 65'

Umpires:
Miao Lin (CHN)
Christiane Hippler (GER)

22 November 2010
19:30

China	2–1	India
Wang 27'; Xu 30'		Surinder 65'

Umpires:
Kang Hyun-young (KOR)
Lesley Nunn (RSA)

- Three players from Kazakhstan: Anastassiya Chsherbakova, Alessya Pyotukh and Yuliya Mikheichik were found guilty of representing Belarus in the 2010 World Cup Qualifiers earlier this year in Kazan, Russia. All matches that Kazakhstan lost below five goals margin was revised to 0–5 and those matches beyond that score are stand.

=== Classification round ===
==== Fifth and sixth place ====
24 November 2010
09:00

Malaysia	3–0	Thailand
Siti 13'; Nadia 34'; Fazilla 57'

Umpires:
Kim Jung-hee (KOR)
Miskarmalia Mohd Ariffin (SGP)

==== Bronze-medal match ====
24 November 2010
14:00

Japan	1–0 (a.e.t.)	India
Manabe 78'

Umpires:
Miao Lin (CHN)
Kang Hyun-young (KOR)

==== Gold-medal match ====
24 November 2010
17:00

China	0–0 (a.e.t.)	South Korea
Penalties
Ma Y. (penalty shoot-out scored); Song (penalty shoot-out scored); Fu (penalty shoot-out scored); Zhao (penalty shoot-out scored); Sun (penalty shoot-out scored)	5–4	(penalty shoot-out missed) Kim E. (penalty shoot-out scored) Kim B. (penalty shoot-out scored) Lee; (penalty shoot-out scored) Kim Y. (penalty shoot-out scored) Kim Jong-E.

Umpires:
Mercedes Sánchez (ARG)
Christiane Hippler (GER)

== Statistics ==
=== Final standings ===
As per statistical convention in field hockey, matches decided in extra time are counted as wins and losses, while matches decided by penalty shoot-outs are counted as draws.

Pos	Team	Pld	W	D	L	GF	GA	GD	Pts	Status
1st place, gold medalist(s)	China	7	5	2	0	31	4	+27	17	Qualified for 2012 Summer Olympics
2nd place, silver medalist(s)	South Korea	7	5	2	0	24	5	+19	17	
3rd place, bronze medalist(s)	Japan	7	5	0	2	22	7	+15	15	
4	India	7	3	0	4	24	7	+17	9	
5	Malaysia	7	3	0	4	15	18	−3	9	
6	Thailand	7	1	0	6	5	47	−42	3	
7	Kazakhstan	6	0	0	6	3	36	−33	0	

Source: Guangzhou2010

=== Goalscorers ===
- Due to forfeit matches, Kazakhstan are counted as scoring 9 own goals.

There were 124 goals scored in 24 matches, for an average of 5.17 goals per match.

7 goals

- (China) Zhao Yudiao
- (India) Surinder Kaur
- (India) Rani Rampal
- (South Korea) Park Mi-Hyun
- (South Korea) Lee Seon-Ok

5 goals

- (China) Ma Yibo
- (Japan) Kaori Chiba
- (Japan) Ai Murakami

3 goals

- (China) Fu Baorong
- (China) Song Qingling
- (China) Xu Xiaoxu
- (Malaysia) Norazlin Sumantri
- (South Korea) Kim Jong-Eun
- (South Korea) Cheon Seul-Ki

2 goals

- (China) Gao Lihua
- (China) Wang Zhishuang
- (India) Saba Anjum
- (India) Subhadra Pradhan
- (India) Chanchan Devi Thokchom
- (Japan) Mazuki Arai
- (Japan) Aki Mitsuhashi
- (Japan) Miyuki Nakagawa
- (Japan) Yukari Yamamoto
- (Kazakhstan) Anastassia Shcherbakova
- (Malaysia) Nor Hidayah Bokhari
- (Malaysia) Norfaraha Hashim
- (Malaysia) Nadia Rahman
- (Malaysia) Siti Ruhani
- (Malaysia) Fazilla Sylvester
- (South Korea) Kim Eun-Sil

1 goal

- (China) De Jiaojiao
- (China) Sun Sinan
- (China) Ma Wei
- (China) Ren Ye
- (India) Joydeep Kaur
- (India) Jasjeet Kaur Handa
- (India) Poonam Rani
- (India) Deepika Thakur
- (Japan) Keiko Manabe
- (Japan) Mie Nakashima
- (Japan) Shiho Otsuka
- (Kazakhstan) Yuliya Mikheichik
- (Malaysia) Noor Hasliza
- (South Korea) Kim Bo-Mi
- (South Korea) Kim Jong-Hee
