= Park Ki-ju =

South Korean field hockey player (born 1990)

- Hangul: 박기주
- RR: Bak Giju
- MR: Pak Kiju

Park Ki-ju
Medal record

Women's field hockey

Representing South Korea

Asian Games
Gold medal – first place	2014 Incheon	Team
Silver medal – second place	2010 Guangzhou	Team

Asia Cup
Silver medal – second place	2013 Kuala Lumpur	

Asian Champions Trophy
Gold medal – first place	2010 Busan	
Gold medal – first place	2011 Ordos	

Park Ki-ju (born 14 February 1990 in Seoul) is a South Korean field hockey player. At the 2012 and 2016 Summer Olympics she competed with the Korea women's national field hockey team in the women's tournament.

As a member of the South Korean team, she won a silver medal at the 2010 Asian Games and a gold medal at 2014 Asian Games.
