= Kate Richardson-Walsh =

British field hockey player (born 1980)

Kate Richardson-Walsh OBE OLY
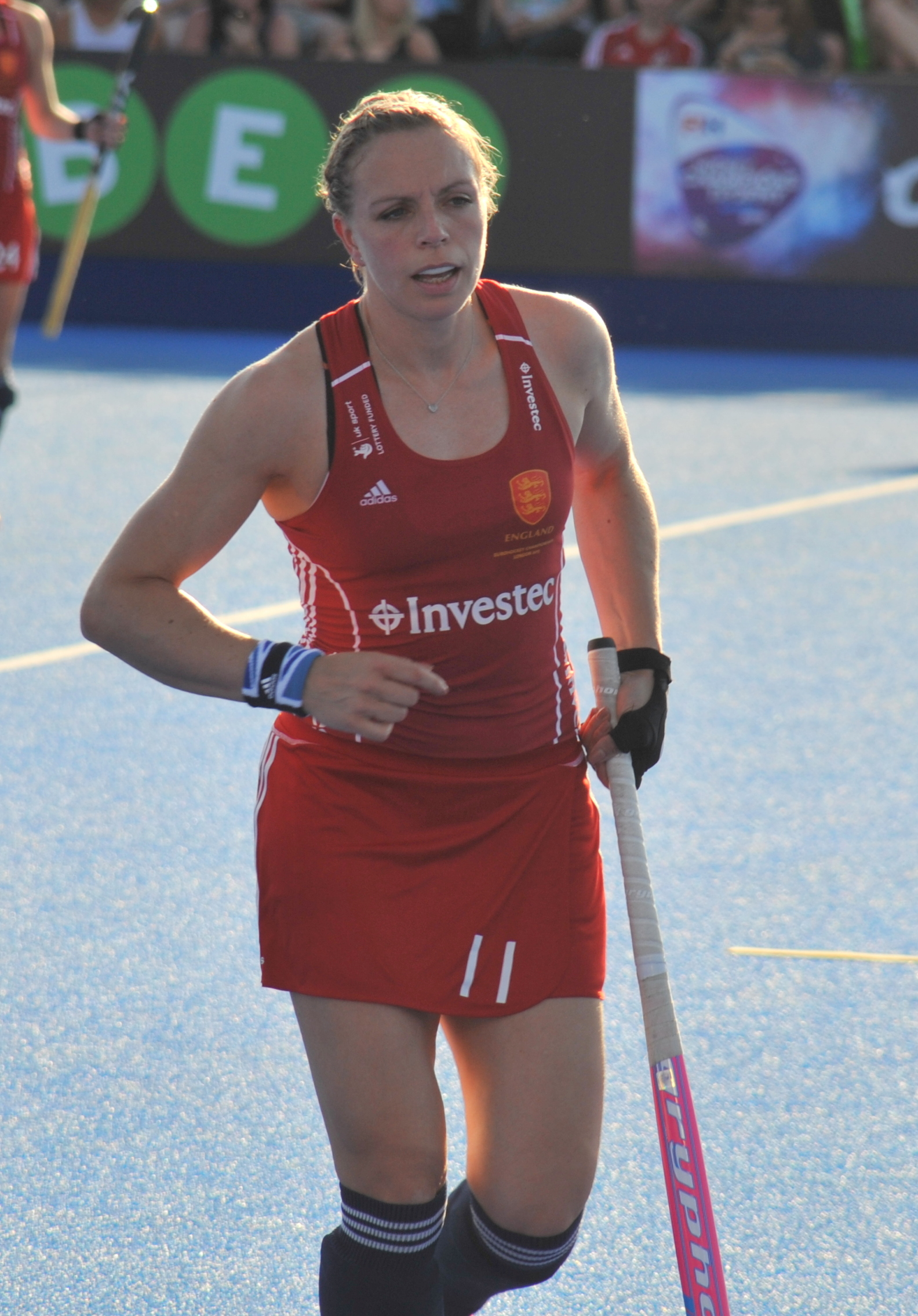
- Richardson-Walsh at the 2015 EuroHockey Championship

Personal information
- Nationality: British
- Born: Kate Louise Walsh; 9 May 1980 (age 46) Withington, Manchester, England
- Height: 1.71 m (5 ft 7 in)
- Weight: 66 kg (146 lb)
- Spouse: Helen Richardson-Walsh (m. 2013)

Sport
- Country: Great Britain; England
- Sport: Field hockey
- Team: Reading
Medal record
Women's field hockey
Representing Great Britain
Olympic Games
Gold medal – first place	2016 Rio de Janeiro	Team
Bronze medal – third place	2012 London	Team
Champions Trophy
Silver medal – second place	2012 Rosario
Representing England
Commonwealth Games
Silver medal – second place	2002 Manchester	Team
Silver medal – second place	2014 Glasgow	Team
Bronze medal – third place	2006 Melbourne	Team
Bronze medal – third place	2010 Delhi	Team
World Cup
Bronze medal – third place	2010 Rosario
Champions Trophy
Bronze medal – third place	2010 Nottingham
EuroHockey Nations Championship
Gold medal – first place	2015 London
Silver medal – second place	2013 Boom
Bronze medal – third place	1999 Cologne
Bronze medal – third place	2005 Dublin
Bronze medal – third place	2007 Manchester
Bronze medal – third place	2009 Amstelveen
Bronze medal – third place	2011 Monchengladbach
Champions Challenge
Gold medal – first place	2002 Johannesburg
Bronze medal – third place	2007 Baku
European Indoor Championships
Silver medal – second place	1998 Ourense

Kate Louise Richardson-Walsh (née Walsh; born 9 May 1980) is an Olympic Gold and Bronze Medal-winning English field hockey player. She was capped a record 375 times for her country and was the England and Great Britain Captain for 13 years.

== Early life ==
Richardson-Walsh was born in Withington, Manchester and attended Priestnall School in Stockport. At the age of 16 she joined Aquinas College in Stockport because it afforded her more support for her hockey. She graduated from Brunel University in 2003 with a 2:1 (BSc Sports Science).

At the age of 11, she joined Didsbury Greys Hockey Club in Manchester followed by Hightown Hockey club. Richardson-Walsh was selected to play for the under 16 Great Britain team when she was 14. It took Richardson-Walsh just nine years to go from starting hockey at her school aged 11 to playing for her country at the Sydney Olympic Games.

== International career ==
Richardson-Walsh made both her England and Great Britain debuts in 1999 and has since gone on to play at the full range of international tournaments including four Summer Olympics, four Hockey World Cups and four Commonwealth Games. Between 2013 and 2016, she was elected to the British Olympic Association Athletes' Commission and European Olympic Athlete's Commissions.

In 2003 aged 23 years old, Richardson-Walsh was made captain of the senior GB hockey team, a role she held for a further 13 years until her retirement in 2016.

As a defender she won a silver medal at the 2002 Commonwealth Games held in her hometown of Manchester, and bronze at the 2007 EuroHockey Nations Championships.

In 2012 Summer Olympics, Walsh was hit by a stick in the team's opening match against Japan and suffered a broken jaw, which was expected to end her journey in Olympic games. However, after undergoing surgery and missing just three matches, she returned to play in their penultimate group game against China and captained the team to win the bronze medal.

In 2014, Richardson-Walsh captained the team to a disappointing 11th out of 12th place in the World Cup in The Hague.

Glasgow 2014 marked her fourth Commonwealth Games. She captained the team to a silver medal and was also selected to be Team England's flag bearer for the closing ceremony.

Following the 2014 Glasgow games, Richardson-Walsh took a three-month sabbatical from international hockey, before returning at the end of the year and regaining her place in the team (and captaincy) via the development squad.

In 2015, Richardson-Walsh captained England to win the Unibet EuroHockey Championships against the Netherlands. After the match was drawn, 2–2, the Gold medal was secured in a shoot-out, with England winning 3–1.

Richardson-Walsh became the most capped female in Great Britain on Saturday 20 February 2016 during test matches in Australia when she overtook Karen Brown who had 355 caps.

In 2016, Richardson-Walsh captained the women's hockey team to their first gold medal at an Olympics. The team was undefeated throughout the tournament, beating the Netherlands in the final on penalties. Kate Richardson-Walsh was selected to be the Team GB flag bearer at the closing ceremony for the Rio Olympics.

After 375 appearances for her country, 19 medals, 49 goals and 13 years as GB and England Captain, Richardson-Walsh confirmed her retirement from International hockey after the Rio Olympic Games.

== Domestic hockey career ==
She played club hockey for Reading in the Women's England Hockey League Premier Division for seven years. and has also acted as the women's team assistant coach. In 2016 Richardson-Walsh announced that she, and her wife Helen, would leave Reading Hockey Club to join HC Bloemendaal in the Netherlands after the Olympics. Both Kate and Helen returned to the UK in June 2016 after one season with the club and helping HC Bloemendaal retain their Hoofdklasse status.

Kate has also played domestic hockey for; Leicester, Slough, SCHC (Netherlands) and Klein Zwitserland (Netherlands)

In December 2017, Richardson-Walsh and her wife Helen both signed for East Grinstead Hockey Club for the Jaffa Super Sixes indoor hockey season.

== Post hockey playing career ==
Following on from her 2016 retirement from International Hockey, Richardson-Walsh has expressed a desire to go into hockey coaching. In July 2018 it was announced that Richardson-Walsh had been appointed as joint Head Coach for Hampstead & Westminster Ladies XI

Kate is an athlete ambassador for sports website platform Pitchero and endorses Osaka hockey sticks. She currently serves as an ambassador for the Women's Sport Trust and supports disability hockey as an ambassador for Access Sport. She currently serves as an ambassador for Roedean School.

Richardson-Walsh was part of the commentary team for the 2017 Eurohockey championships, along with her wife Helen, which was broadcast on BT Sport. She also provided hockey commentary and analysis for BBC Sport and BBC Radio 5 Live at the 2018 Commonwealth Games, and analysis for the 2018 World Cup on BT Sport.

== Personal life ==
In 2008, Walsh began a relationship with international teammate Helen Richardson. They married in 2013 and both changed their last names thereafter.

Kate and Helen Richardson-Walsh made history becoming the first same-sex married couple to win an Olympic Gold medal together. and the first married British couple to win Gold together since 1920.

In 2017, Kate and Helen Richardson-Walsh were both awarded honours, making them the first same-sex married couple to be honoured on the same list.

Richardson-Walsh's younger sister Rachel was also capped for England hockey.

== Awards ==
Richardson-Walsh is three times a winner of the Hockey Writers Club UK Player of the Year award (2003. 2007 and 2012).

In 2003 and 2016, she was shortlisted for the FIH World Player of the Year Award.

She was named Great Britain Hockey Athlete of the Year in 2007.

In 2014, Richardson-Walsh was awarded an Honorary Fellowship from Liverpool John Moores University.

Richardson-Walsh was appointed Member of the Order of the British Empire (MBE) in the 2015 New Year Honours for services to hockey and promoted to Officer of the Order of the British Empire (OBE) in the 2017 New Year Honours, also for services to hockey.

In 2016, Richardson-Walsh was the first hockey player to be shortlisted for BBC Sports Personality of the Year. She achieved 6th place out of 16 nominees with 34,604 votes

In June 2017, Richardson-Walsh was presented with the highest honour in English Hockey; the England Hockey Member of Honour. The award is the highest accolade that can be bestowed by the Governing Body and is made in recognition of outstanding contribution to England Hockey. Including Richardson-Walsh, there are only six existing Members of Honour.

Brunel University presented alumna Richardson-Walsh with an Honorary Doctorate in July 2017, recognising her service to the national or international community.

Richardson-Walsh was the first British hockey player to be inducted into the European Hall of Fame by the EHF. The ceremony took place during the 2017 European Hockey Championships in Holland.

Kate and Helen Richardson-Walsh were awarded the National Lottery Spirit of Sport Award at the 2017 annual Sports Journalist's Association (SJA) British Sports Awards.
