= Alana Millington =

New Zealand field hockey player

Personal information
- Born: 28 June 1988 (age 38) Kogarah, New South Wales, Australia
- Height: 1.71 m (5 ft 7 in)

Sport
- Sport: Field hockey
- Position: Defence / Midfield
Senior career
Years	Team	Caps	Goals
?–present	Northland	-	-
National team
Years	Team	Caps	Goals
2007–2013	New Zealand	42	(0)
Medal record
Women's field hockey
Representing New Zealand
Champions Trophy
Bronze medal – third place	2011 Amstelveen	Team
- Updated on 16 August 2012 (national)

Alana Millington (born 28 June 1988) is a New Zealand field hockey player. She has competed for the New Zealand women's national field hockey team (the Black Sticks Women) since 2007, including in the team at the 2012 Summer Olympics.
