= Field hockey at the 2010 Asian Games =

Field Hockey tournament in Guangzhou, China

- Venue: Aoti Hockey Field
- Dates: 13 October 2010 – 25 October 2010
- Competitors: 272 from 12 nations

Medalists
gold medal	Pakistan (men); China (women)
silver medal	Malaysia (men); South Korea (women)
bronze medal	India (men); Japan (women)

The Field hockey event at the 2010 Asian Games was held in Guangzhou, Guangdong, China from 13 November 2010 for women and 15 November 2010 for men. In this tournament, 10 teams played in the men's competition, and 7 teams in the women's competition. All matches were played at the Aoti Hockey Field. Pakistan became the field hockey Asian champions in the men's event and China in the women's event.

== Medalists ==
Event	Gold	Silver	Bronze
Men	Pakistan; Zeeshan Ashraf; Muhammad Zubair; Waseem Ahmed; Muhammad Irfan; Muhammad Imran; Shakeel Abbasi; Rehan Butt; Muhammad Rizwan; Salman Akbar; Abdul Haseem Khan; Fareed Ahmed; Muhammad Waqas; Shafqat Rasool; Muhammad Rashid; Muhammad Tousiq; Sohail Abbas	Malaysia; Roslan Jamaluddin; Baljit Singh Charun; Hafifihafiz Hanafi; Izwan Firdaus; Mohd Amin Rahim; Mohd Marhan Jalil; Faizal Saari; Azreen Rizal; Madzli Ikmar; Tengku Ahmad Tajuddin; Nabil Fiqri; Sukri Mutalib; Razie Rahim; Azlan Misron; Shahrun Nabil; Kumar Subramaniam	India; Bharat Chettri; Bharat Chikara; Danish Mujtaba; Sandeep Singh; Arjun Halappa; Prabodh Tirkey; Dhananjay Mahadik; Sardara Singh; Dharamvir Singh; Ravipal Singh; Sarvanjit Singh; Shivendra Singh; Gurbaj Singh; Tushar Khandker; Rajpal Singh; Vikram Pillay
Women	China; Ma Yibo; Huang Xuejiao; Ma Wei; Sun Sinan; Fu Baorong; Li Shuang; Gao Lihua; Wang Zhishuang; Zhang Yimeng; Li Hongxia; Ren Ye; Zhao Yudiao; Song Qingling; De Jiaojiao; Xu Xiaoxu; Li Dongxiao	South Korea; Moon Young-hui; Kim Young-ran; Kim Bo-mi; Park Seon-mi; Lee Seon-ok; Kim Jong-hee; Park Mi-hyun; Kim Jong-eun; Kim Da-rae; Cheon Seul-ki; Jeon Yu-mi; Gim Sung-hee; Jang Soo-ji; Kim Ok-ju; Kim Eun-sil; Park Ki-ju	Japan; Sakiyo Asano; Keiko Miura; Akemi Kato; Ai Murakami; Miyuki Nakagawa; Keiko Manabe; Yukari Yamamoto; Mie Nakashima; Rika Komazawa; Kaori Chiba; Nagisa Hayashi; Mazuki Arai; Kana Nagayama; Mayumi Ono; Aki Mitsuhashi; Shiho Otsuka

== Medal table ==
Rank	Nation	Gold	Silver	Bronze	Total
1	China	1	0	0	1
1	Pakistan	1	0	0	1
3	Malaysia	0	1	0	1
3	South Korea	0	1	0	1
5	India	0	0	1	1
5	Japan	0	0	1	1
Totals (6 entries)		2	2	2	6

== Qualification ==
Top 6 Asian teams, South Korea, India, Pakistan, Japan, China and Malaysia could enter the men's competition directly. For the next two spots a qualification tournament was held in Dhaka, Bangladesh from 7 to 16 May 2010. Oman and Singapore qualified as top two teams, Hong Kong and Bangladesh were added later.

Women's qualification tournament was held in Bangkok, Thailand from 21 to 29 May 2010. Three teams qualified for the Asian Games but later Chinese Taipei withdrew.

Men

Rank	Team
1	Oman
2	Singapore
3	Hong Kong
4	Chinese Taipei
5	Bangladesh
6	Sri Lanka
7	Thailand

Women

Rank	Team
1	Kazakhstan
2	Chinese Taipei
3	Thailand
4	Hong Kong
5	Singapore

== Draw ==
The teams were distributed according to their position at the FIH World Rankings using the serpentine system for their distribution.

Group A

- South Korea (6)
- China (14)
- Malaysia (15)
- Singapore (39)
- Oman (43)

Group B

- Pakistan (8)
- India (9)
- Japan (16)
- Bangladesh (34)
- Hong Kong (54)

== Final standing ==
=== Men ===
Rank	Team	Pld	W	D	L
1st place, gold medalist(s)	Pakistan	6	4	1	1
2nd place, silver medalist(s)	Malaysia	6	4	1	1
3rd place, bronze medalist(s)	India	6	5	0	1
4	South Korea	6	3	2	1
5	China	6	4	0	2
6	Japan	6	3	0	3
7	Oman	6	2	0	4
8	Bangladesh	6	1	0	5
9	Hong Kong	5	1	0	4
10	Singapore	5	0	0	5

=== Women ===
Rank	Team	Pld	W	D	L
1st place, gold medalist(s)	China	7	5	2	0
2nd place, silver medalist(s)	South Korea	7	5	2	0
3rd place, bronze medalist(s)	Japan	7	5	0	2
4	India	7	3	0	4
5	Malaysia	7	3	0	4
6	Thailand	7	1	0	6
7	Kazakhstan	6	0	0	6
