= Kim Bo-mi (field hockey) =

South Korean field hockey player

Personal information
- Born: 7 October 1985 (age 40)
- Height: 1.57 m (5 ft 2 in)
- Weight: 56 kg (123 lb)

Sport
- Sport: Field hockey
National team
Years	Team	Caps	Goals
–	South Korea	117	-
Medal record
Women's field hockey
Representing South Korea
Asian Games
Silver medal – second place	2010 Guangzhou	Team
Asia Cup
Bronze medal – third place	2009 Bangkok
Asian Champions Trophy
Gold medal – first place	2010 Busan
Gold medal – first place	2018 Donghae

Kim Bo-mi (Korean: 김보미, born 7 October 1985) is a South Korean field hockey player. She competed for the South Korea women's national field hockey team at the 2016 Summer Olympics.
