= Zhang Yimeng =

Chinese field hockey player

Personal information
- Born: October 22, 1983 (age 42) Meishan, Sichuan
Medal record
Women's field hockey
Representing China
Olympic Games
Silver medal – second place	2008 Beijing	Team
Champions Trophy
Silver medal – second place	2003 Sydney
Asian Games
Gold medal – first place	2006 Doha	Team
Gold medal – first place	2010 Guangzhou	Team
Asian Champions Trophy
Silver medal – second place	2011 Ordos

Zhang Yimeng (simplified Chinese: 张益萌; traditional Chinese: 張益萌; pinyin: Zhāng Yìméng; born October 22, 1983, in Meishan, Sichuan) is a Chinese field hockey player who competed at the 2004 Summer Olympics.

She finished fourth with the Chinese team in the women's competition. She played one match as goalkeeper.
