= Moon Young-hui =

South Korean field hockey player

Personal information
- Nationality: South Korean
- Born: 19 June 1983 (age 43)

Korean name
- Hangul: 문영희
- RR: Mun Yeonghui
- MR: Mun Yŏnghŭi

Sport
- Sport: Field hockey
Medal record
Women's field hockey
Representing South Korea
Asian Games
Silver medal – second place	2010 Guangzhou	Team
Asian Champions Trophy
Gold medal – first place	2010 Busan

Moon Young-hui (born 19 June 1983) is a South Korean field hockey player. At the 2008 and 2012 Summer Olympics she competed with the Korea women's national field hockey team in the women's tournament.
