= Kim Eun-sil =

South Korean hockey player (born 1982)

Personal information
- Nationality: South Korean
- Born: 5 December 1982 (age 43)

Sport
- Sport: Field hockey
Medal record
Women's field hockey
Representing South Korea
Asian Games
Silver medal – second place	2010 Guangzhou	Team
Asia Cup
Bronze medal – third place	2009 Bangkok
Asian Champions Trophy
Gold medal – first place	2010 Busan

Kim Eun-sil (born 5 December 1982) is a South Korean former field hockey player. She competed in the women's tournament at the 2008 Summer Olympics.
