= Pitchero =

British sports website business

- Available in: English
- Founded: 2007
- Owner: Pitch Hero Ltd
- Founders: Mark Fletcher, CEO; Jon Milsom, CTO
- Website: Pitchero.com
- Commercial: Yes
- Registration: Required for club/league websites
- Launched: 2008
- Current status: Online

Pitchero (Pitch Hero Ltd) is a sports website company based in Leeds, United Kingdom. Founded in 2007, it provides a website building and hosting service for semi-professional and amateur sports teams and sports leagues in football, rugby union, rugby league, field hockey, ice hockey, cricket, and netball.

Pitchero charges a monthly subscription fee to sports clubs. Grassroots sports clubs use Pitchero to create team websites, where they can manage membership and payments; post information on fixtures, results, league table rankings, and player stats; and recruit new players, parents, and coaches. They also use Pitchero as a communication tool to facilitate internal team discussions and team selection; upload photos and videos to share with their supporters; and share match previews and directions with opposing teams.

== History ==
Pitchero was founded in 2007 by CEO Mark Fletcher and CTO Jon Milsom during their final year at university. Fletcher received a degree in economics and politics from Loughborough University.

The pair launched their first trial version of Pitchero in February 2008. Based in Leeds, their angel investors were Andrew Hobson and Andrew McCarthy. In the summer of 2008, the company laid off its only employee and cut back on expenses due to the 2008 financial crisis.

By 2009, Pitchero was receiving nearly 20 percent of all rugby-related Internet traffic in the UK, according to Hitwise. In 2011, The Sunday Telegraph reported that 12,000 clubs were using Pitchero, including a core of 4,000 teams that were using the site daily.

Pitchero made a free mobile app available in 2013. In 2016, the company introduced the Pitchero Play app for sports teams to record, upload and share videos of their matches in real time on their websites and across their social media channels.

In 2017, Pitchero secured £3.1 million in funding from a group of investors led by ICM, a global fund manager. As of 2017, the company reported that it had 70,000 teams in the Pitchero network, and claimed to have over 1 million active users.

In 2018, Pitchero acquired Teamer, a rival in the sports tech business which had a mobile app for team management, and had previously acquired Club Website. When the acquisition was announced, Pitchero had 24 employees, while Teamer had 22 employees in the UK, seven in India, and one in Australia.

== Reviews ==
In a review of Pitchero Play in 2016, football journalist Charlie Eccleshare wrote that the ability to watch and share match videos "provides a tiny insight into the buzz professionals must get when watching themselves, because for a fleeting moment it makes you feel like a celebrity and at the centre of the football universe." Among possible uses for the video app, Eccleshare listed the ability to share video clips of a goal or skill; keeping fans engaged when they aren't able to attend games; recruiting new players and increasing grassroots participation; and appealing referee decisions. While noting that the video content had increased traffic to club websites, he suggested that some clubs might not be willing to pay the additional fee to use Pitchero Play.

== Notable people ==
Olympic gold medalist Kate Richardson-Walsh, OBE, former captain of the Team GB and England women's hockey teams, is an Athlete Ambassador for Pitchero. Richardson used Pitchero at Reading Hockey Club.
