= Izuki Tanaka =

Japanese field hockey player (born 1992)

Medal record

Women's field hockey

Representing Japan

Asian Champions Trophy
| Gold medal – first place | 2013 Kakamigahara | |
| Bronze medal – third place | 2011 Ordos | |

Izuki Tanaka (田中 泉樹, Tanaka Izuki; born 7 April 1992) is a Japanese field hockey player. At the 2012 Summer Olympics she competed with the Japan women's national field hockey team in the women's tournament.
