= Carla Rebecchi =

Argentine field hockey player

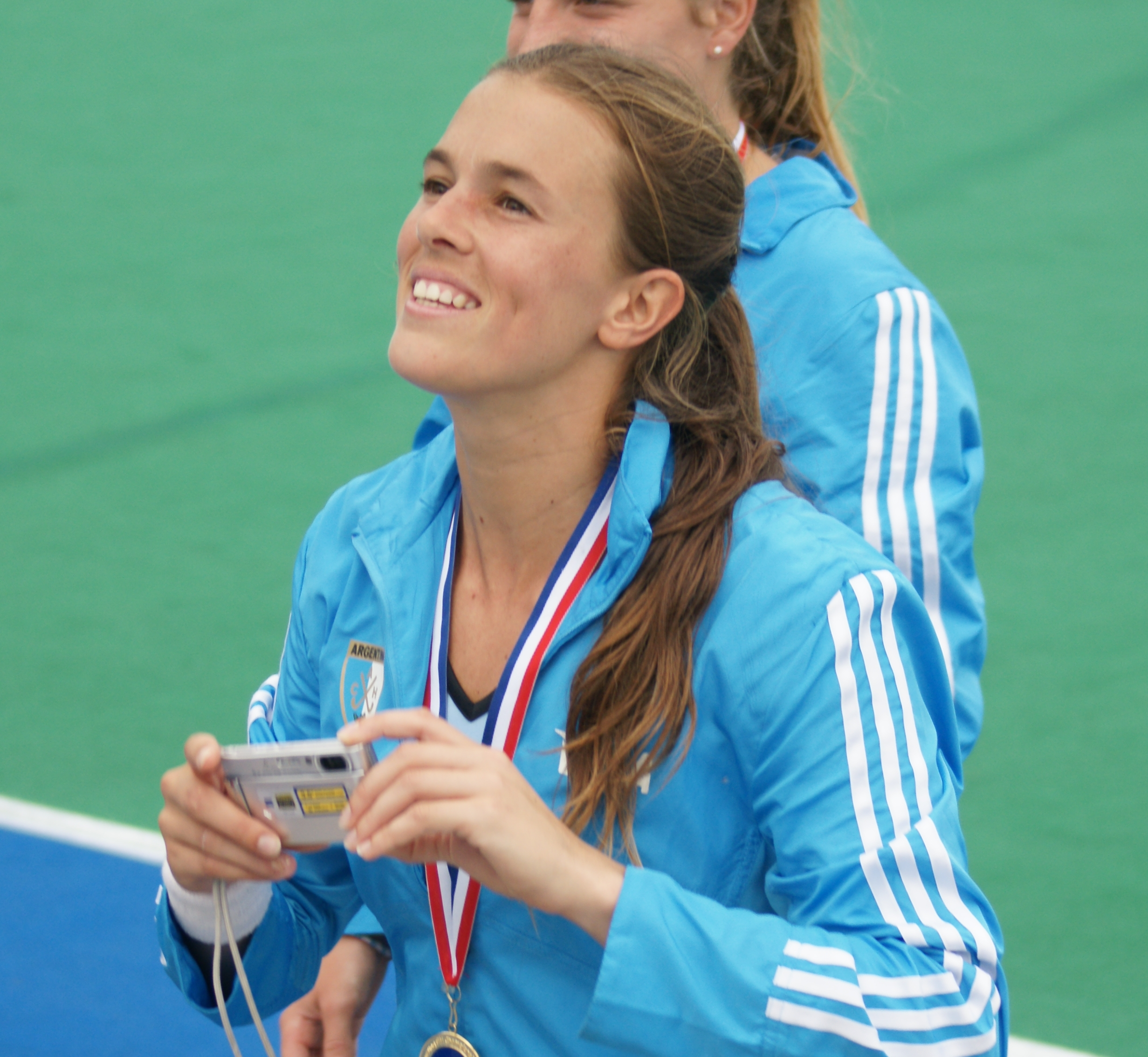

Personal information
- Born: September 7, 1984 (age 41) Buenos Aires, Argentina
- Height: 1.63 m (5 ft 4 in)

Sport
- Sport: Field hockey
- Position: Forward
- Club: Ciudad de Buenos Aires
Youth career
- Team
- –: Banco Provincia
Senior career
Years	Team	Caps	Goals
2006–2011	Club de Campo	-	-
2011–Present	Ciudad de Buenos Aires	-	-
2020–Present	Royal Antwerp HC	-	-
National team
Years	Team	Caps	Goals
2005	Argentina U21		-
2003–2020	Argentina	317	(168)
Medal record
Women's field hockey
Representing Argentina
Olympic Games
Silver medal – second place	2012 London	Team
Bronze medal – third place	2008 Beijing	Team
World Cup
Gold medal – first place	2010 Rosario	Team
Bronze medal – third place	2006 Madrid	Team
Bronze medal – third place	2014 The Hague	Team
World League
Gold medal – first place	2014-15 Rosario	Team
Champions Trophy
Gold medal – first place	2008 Mönchengladbach	Team
Gold medal – first place	2009 Sydney	Team
Gold medal – first place	2010 Nottingham	Team
Gold medal – first place	2012 Rosario	Team
Gold medal – first place	2014 Mendoza	Team
Gold medal – first place	2016 London	Team
Silver medal – second place	2007 Quilmes	Team
Silver medal – second place	2011 Amstelveen	Team
Bronze medal – third place	2004 Rosario	Team
Pan American Games
Gold medal – first place	2007 Rio de Janeiro	Team
Gold medal – first place	2019 Lima	Team
Silver medal – second place	2011 Guadalajara	Team
Pan American Cup
Gold medal – first place	2009 Hamilton	Team
Gold medal – first place	2013 Mendoza	Team

Carla Rebecchi (born 7 September 1984) is an Argentine field hockey player who won the bronze medal at the 2008 Summer Olympics in Beijing and the silver medal at the 2012 Summer Olympics in London with the Argentina national field hockey team. In 2010, she won the World Cup in Rosario, Argentina. Carla has also won six Champions Trophy tournaments, the 2014–2015 World League, three medals at the Pan American Games and two Pan American Cups.

After Luciana Aymar retired and Macarena Rodriguez was left out of the national team following the 2015 Pan American Games, she was named the team's captain. In February 2017 she announced her retirement after 290 matches and 153 goals, and returned after becoming a mother on 3 September 2018.
