= Park Seon-mi =

South Korean field hockey player

Personal information
- Nationality: South Korean
- Born: 2 August 1982 (age 43) South Korea

Korean name
- Hangul: 박선미
- RR: Bak Seonmi
- MR: Pak Sŏnmi

Sport
- Country: South Korea
- Sport: Field hockey
Medal record
Women's field hockey
Representing South Korea
Asian Games
Silver medal – second place	2010 Guangzhou	Team
Asia Cup
Silver medal – second place	2007 Hong Kong
Asian Champions Trophy
Gold medal – first place	2010 Busan

Park Seon-mi (born 2 August 1982) is a South Korean field hockey player. At the 2012 Summer Olympics, she competed with the Korea women's national field hockey team in the women's tournament.
