= Sun Sinan =

Chinese field hockey player (born 1988)

Medal record

Women's field hockey

Representing China

Asian Games
| Gold medal – first place | 2010 Guangzhou | Team |

Asian Champions Trophy
| Silver medal – second place | 2011 Ordos | |

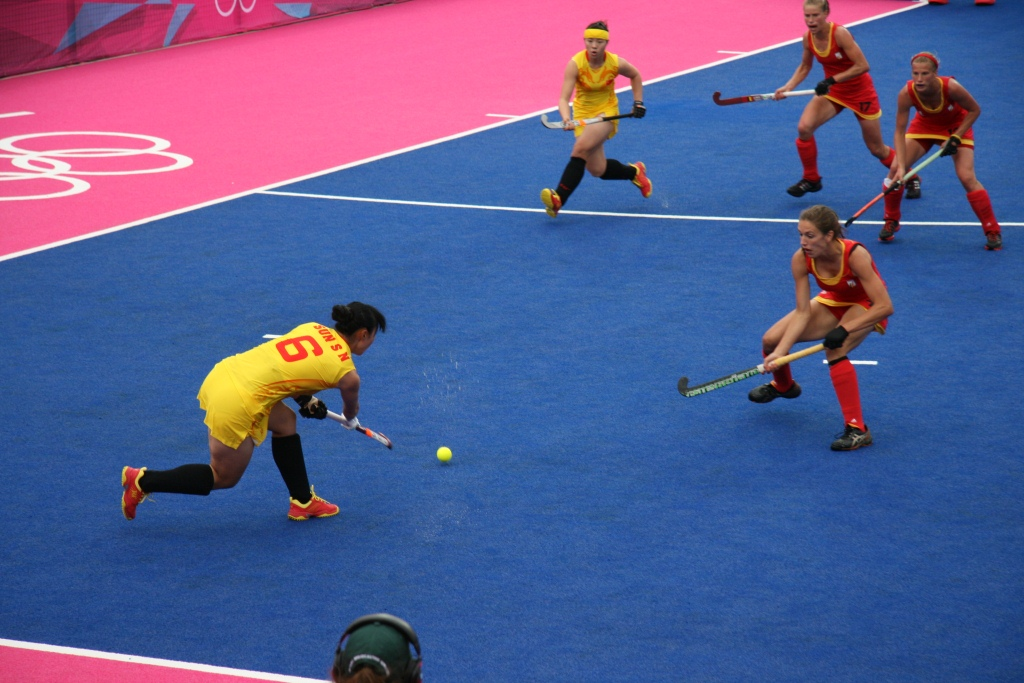
Sun Sinan-London 2012

Sun Sinan (Chinese: 孙思楠; born 2 October 1988, Anshan, Liaoning) is a Chinese field hockey player.

== Olympic career ==
At the 2012 Summer Olympics she competed with the China women's national field hockey team in the women's tournament.
