= Xu Xiaoxu =

Chinese field hockey player (born 1986)

Medal record

Women's field hockey

Representing China

Asian Games
Gold medal – first place	2010 Guangzhou	Team
Silver medal – second place	2014 Incheon	Team

Asian Champions Trophy
Silver medal – second place	2011 Ordos	

Xu Xiaoxu (Chinese: 许晓旭; 8 August 1986 in Beijing) is a Chinese field hockey player. At the 2012 Summer Olympics she competed with the China women's national field hockey team in the women's tournament.

She won a silver medal as a member of the Chinese team at 2014 Asian Games.
