= Yogita Bali =

Indian female hockey player

Yogita Bali (born 8 May 1987) is an Indian female hockey player from Amritsar who played for India women's national field hockey team as a goal keeper. She represented India at 16th Asian Games and FIH Olympic and was the former coach for senior women's hockey team during 2017-2018. She competed in 2nd Asian Champions Trophy in Ordos, China, and the FIH Champions League in Dublin, Ireland. Bali is a three time holder of Best Player of the Tournament award in the All India Railway Women Hockey Championship.

== Career ==
As a Player

Bali was part of Indian women hockey team as a goalkeeper in the year 2010 and 2011. She played for Asian Champions Trophy, 2010 Asian Games, 2012 Olympic Qualifier and 2013 HWL R2 in Delhi. In 2013 at the FIH World League Round 2 which was held in New Delhi, India, she led the India team to win a Gold medal.

As a Coach

Bali, as the coach of the Indian senior women's hockey team, led the team in securing the Silver Medal at the Asian Champion Trophy held in Korea. In 2018, Junior Youth Olympic Games held in Argentina she trained the junior women's national squad where the Indian team won silver medal.

== Awards and achievements ==
Goodwill Ambassador of India Sports

Best Player of the Tournament award thrice (2012, 2013 and 2022)
