= Ma Wei =

Chinese field hockey player (born 1986)

Medal record

Women's field hockey

Representing China

Asian Games
Gold medal – first place	2010 Guangzhou	Team

Asia Cup
Gold medal – first place	2009 Bangkok	

Asian Champions Trophy
Silver medal – second place	2011 Ordos	

Ma Wei (Chinese: 马威; 19 December 1986, Changzhou, Jiangsu) is a Chinese field hockey player. At the 2012 Summer Olympics she competed with the China women's national field hockey team in the women's tournament.
