= Helen Richardson-Walsh =

English field hockey player

Helen Richardson-Walsh MBE
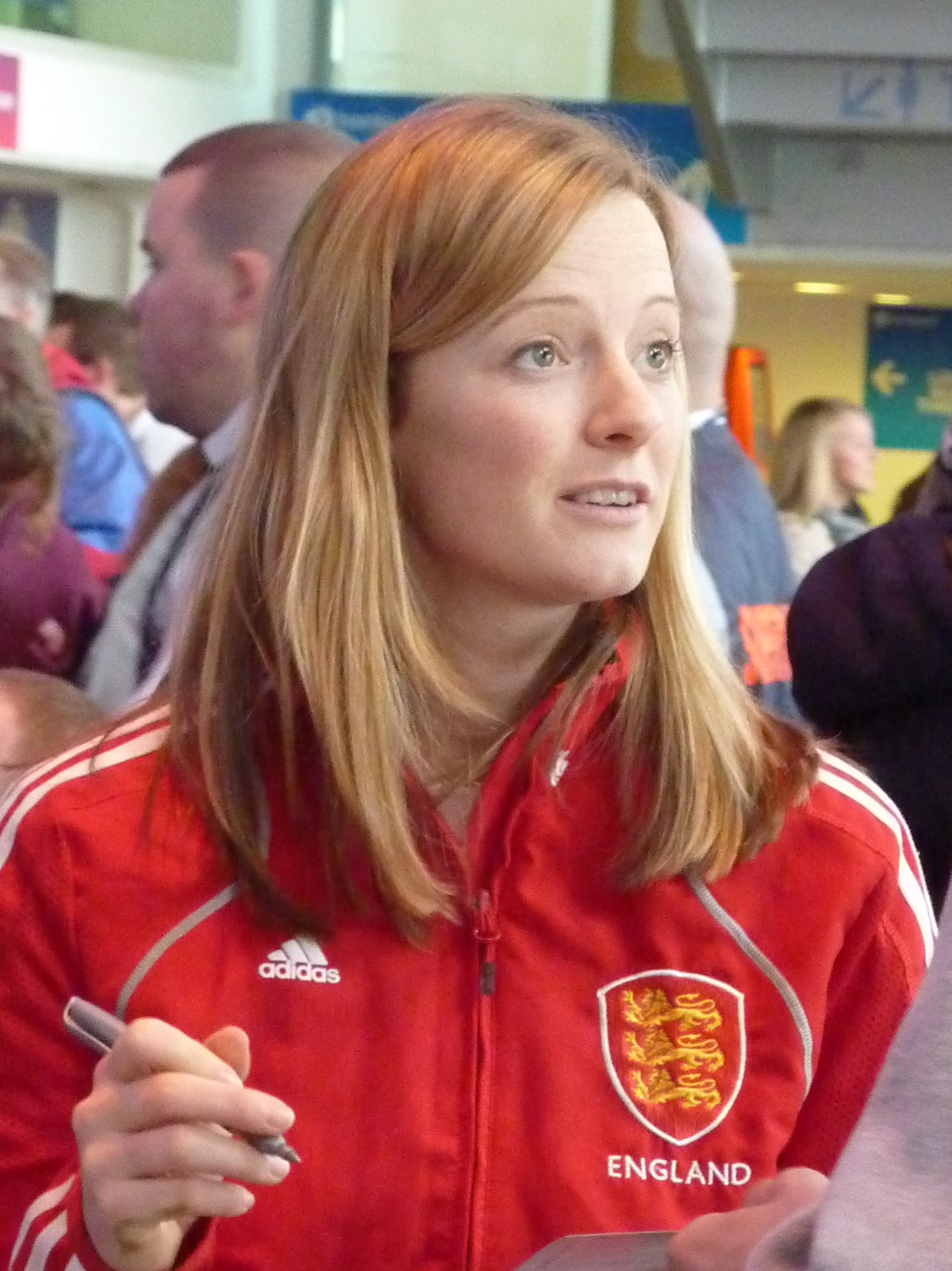
- Helen Richardson-Walsh in 2011

Personal information
- Born: Helen Richardson; 23 September 1981 (age 45) Hitchin, Hertfordshire, England
- Height: 1.65 m (5 ft 5 in)
- Weight: 55 kg (121 lb)
- Spouse: Kate Richardson-Walsh (m. 2013)

Sport
- Country: Great Britain; England
- Sport: Field hockey
Medal record
Representing Great Britain
Olympic Games
Gold medal – first place	2016 Rio de Janeiro	Team
Bronze medal – third place	2012 London	Team
Champions Trophy
Silver medal – second place	2012 Rosario
Representing England
Commonwealth Games
Silver medal – second place	2002 Manchester	Team
Bronze medal – third place	2006 Melbourne	Team
Bronze medal – third place	2010 Delhi	Team
World Cup
Bronze medal – third place	2010 Rosario
Champions Trophy
Bronze medal – third place	2010 Nottingham
EuroHockey Nations Championship
Gold medal – first place	2015 London
Silver medal – second place	2013 Boom
Bronze medal – third place	1999 Cologne
Bronze medal – third place	2005 Dublin
Bronze medal – third place	2007 Manchester
Bronze medal – third place	2009 Amstelveen
Bronze medal – third place	2011 Monchengladbach
Champions Challenge
Gold medal – first place	2002 Johannesburg
Bronze medal – third place	2007 Baku

Helen Richardson-Walsh (née Richardson, born 23 September 1981) is an English hockey player who plays as a midfielder. She has been a member of both the England and the Great Britain women's field hockey teams since 1999, and was a member of the Great Britain team who won gold at the 2016 Summer Olympics.

== Early life ==
Helen Richardson was born in Hitchin, Hertfordshire and grew up in West Bridgford, Nottinghamshire with her 3 older brothers. She began playing hockey at a young age, joining West Bridgford Hockey Club at the age of seven. She initially attended Uphill Primary school in Weston Super-Mare before returning to her home town of West Bridgford where she attended West Bridgford School and South Nottingham College. Richardson-Walsh started a degree course in Human Biology at Aston University in 2000 but did not complete the course.

== International hockey career ==
Richardson-Walsh achieved 293 international caps for England and Great Britain, making her at the point of her retirement, the 5th most capped GB player in the history of the women's game. She represented Great Britain at the Sydney, Beijing, London and Rio Olympic Games. Career highlights include an Olympic Gold (2016) and Bronze medal (2012), European Gold medal (2015), World Cup Bronze medal (2010), Champions Trophy (2012) and Commonwealth Games (2002) Silver medals.

Richardson-Walsh won her first England cap in 1999, at the age of 17. At age 18 she was a member of the Great Britain team at the 2000 Olympics in Sydney, becoming the youngest female hockey player to represent Great Britain at an Olympic Games.

Richardson was a member of the silver medal-winning England team at the 2002 Commonwealth Games. After the 2002 World Cup she underwent three operations on her ankle, returning to the sport in 2004.

Richardson won bronze medals with the England team at the 2006 and 2010 Commonwealth Games. She competed in her second Olympics in 2008, where Great Britain did not advance to the semi-finals.

Richardson was part of the Great Britain team that won the bronze medal at the 2012 Olympics in London, captaining the team for two games after regular captain Kate Walsh broke her jaw in the opening match. Between 2013 and 2014, she underwent surgery twice for spinal disc herniation. She was left out of the England squad for the 2014 World Cup, but returned to international hockey with the Great Britain team in April 2015. In August 2015, she was part of the England team that won the EuroHockey Nations Championship for the first time, scoring a penalty in the gold medal match penalty shoot-out against the Netherlands.

Richardson-Walsh was a member of the Great Britain team that won the gold medal at the 2016 Summer Olympics, the first time that Great Britain had won gold in women's hockey. She scored one of Great Britain's two penalties in the deciding penalty shoot-out in the final against the Netherlands.

== Domestic hockey career ==
Richardson-Walsh's first club was West Bridgford Hockey Club in Nottingham which she joined aged 7. She progressed to play for Sherwood Hockey Clubs before joining Leicester Hockey Club.

After the 2008 Olympics, she spent a year playing for HC Den Bosch in the Netherlands before returning to England, after which she played for Reading Hockey Club for seven years. In 2016, Richardson-Walsh announced that she would leave Reading Hockey Club with her wife Kate to join HC Bloemendaal in the Netherlands after the Olympics, and suggested that she would retire from international hockey. In June 2017, Richardson-Walsh and her wife returned from HC Bloemendaal after helping the team maintain their place in the Hoofdklasse.

Richardson-Walsh announced she had signed for Cambridge City Hockey Club on a 12-month contract for the 2017–18 season. The women's team plays in the Investec Women's League, Conference East and the club is chaired by her brother Andy Richardson. In 2018, Richardson-Walsh confirmed that she would play for another season at CCHC, as well as taking on an Assistant Coaching role at the club. Richardson-Walsh became Head Coach for Cambridge City Hockey Club for the 2019-20 season.

In December 2017, Richardson-Walsh and her wife Kate both signed for East Grinstead Hockey Club for the Jaffa Super Sixes indoor hockey season.

== Other career and voluntary work ==
Between 2012 and 2016, Richardson-Walsh held the role of a ‘Sky Sports Living For Sport Athlete Mentor’ as part of the Youth Sport Trust

In July 2014 during a break from hockey caused by injury, Richardson-Walsh volunteered in Bali teaching English to fishermen and their families and participating in a coral re-building programme.

As a lifelong Spurs fan, Richardson-Walsh is a patron of the Proud Lilywhites, the official LGBT association of Tottenham Hotspur Football Club (2014 – current). Richardson-Walsh is also an Ambassador for Access Sport, a charity whose mission is to give more children, particularly in disadvantaged areas, access to a wide range of quality local sport (2014 – current).

Richardson-Walsh was part of the commentary team for the 2017 Eurohockey championships, along with her wife Kate, which was broadcast on BT Sport. She also provided hockey commentary and analysis for BBC Sport and BBC Radio 5 Live at the 2018 Commonwealth Games, and analysis for the 2018 World Cup on BT Sport.

For the 2017–18 academic year, Richardson-Walsh joined The Perse School in Cambridge as a part-time Games Coach.

Richardson-Walsh was selected to be an Athlete Role Model for the Youth Olympic Games which will take place in Buenos Aires, Argentina in 2018. She will be representing hockey and Team GB, providing workshops, taking part in Q&A session and advising young athletes.

Richardson-Walsh has completed a degree in psychology with the Open University. As of October 2019, she is studying for a masters in institutional psychology.

== Awards ==
In 2009, she was shortlisted for the International Hockey Federation's World Player of the Year Award and has been named in the FIH World All Stars Team three times, in 2009, 2010 and 2011.

In 2009 and 2010, she was named as Player of the Year by the Hockey Writers' Club

In 2009, 2011 and 2016, she was awarded the Majorie Pollard Salver, making her the first player to receive the award three times.

In 2009, she was named as the BOA Athlete of the Year by Great Britain Hockey.

Following her Gold Medal success Richardson-Walsh has received various awards and accolades from her home city of Nottingham, including; Nottingham City Transport naming a bus after her, local Brewery 'Magpie Brewery ' creating a guest ale 'Golden Hels' in her honour and receiving The Nottingham Sportswoman of the Year Award. In 2017 Richardson-Walsh also won the Sports Person of the Year in the Sport Nottinghamshire Awards.

In the 2017 New Year Honours, Richardson-Walsh was awarded an MBE for services to hockey. Her wife and teammate Kate received an OBE, making them the first same-sex married couple to be honoured in the same list.

Helen and Kate Richardson-Walsh were awarded the National Lottery Spirit of Sport Award at the 2017 annual Sports Journalist's Association (SJA) British Sports Awards.

== Personal life ==
In 2008, Richardson-Walsh began a relationship with her Great Britain and England teammate Kate Walsh. They married in 2013, and both adopted the surname Richardson-Walsh. In September 2019, Richardson-Walsh announced on social media that she was pregnant with the couple's first child, with the child being due at the end of the year. On 31 December 2019, Richardson-Walsh gave birth to a daughter named Pfeiffer.

Both Kate and Helen Richardson-Walsh were members of the gold medal-winning Great Britain team at the 2016 Olympics; this made them the first same-sex married couple to win Olympic gold as part of the same team, and the first British married couple to win gold as part of the same team since 1920.

Helen Richardson-Walsh's father coaches Winscombe Ladies Hockey Club, where Richardson-Walsh's younger half-sister Gabby is a first team player. She has three older brothers, including Andy Richardson, who is the Chairman of Cambridge Hockey Club, and Steven Richardson, who plays for Wimbledon Hockey Club.

Richardson-Walsh has spoken about mental health issues including her experiences of depression in 2008 and 2014.
