= Gao Lihua =

Chinese field hockey player

Personal information
- Born: October 31, 1979 (age 46) Dalian, Liaoning
Medal record
Women's field hockey
Representing China
Olympic Games
Silver medal – second place	2008 Beijing	Team
Asian Games
Gold medal – first place	2006 Doha	Team
Gold medal – first place	2010 Guangzhou	Team
Asia Cup
Gold medal – first place	2009 Bangkok
Bronze medal – third place	2004 New Delhi
Bronze medal – third place	2007 Hong Kong
Asian Champions Trophy
Silver medal – second place	2011 Ordos
Champions Trophy
Silver medal – second place	2003 Sydney	Team

Gao Lihua (simplified Chinese: 高丽华; traditional Chinese: 高麗華; pinyin: Gāo Lìhuá; born October 31, 1979, in Dalian, Liaoning) is a Chinese field hockey player who competed at the 2004 Summer Olympics, and won a silver medal in the 2008 Summer Olympics.

At the 2004 Olympic Games, she was part of the Chinese team that finished fourth in the women's competition. She played all six matches and scored one goal.
