= Céline Wilde =

German field hockey player (born 1990)

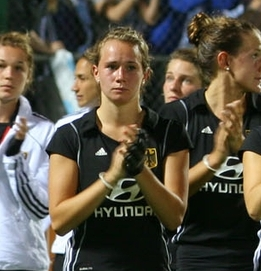
Wilde playing for Germany, against Argentina, in 2010

Céline Wilde (born 7 February 1990 in Hamburg) is a German field hockey player. At the 2012 Summer Olympics, she competed for the Germany women's national field hockey team in the women's event.
