= Kim Jong-eun =

South Korean field hockey player (born 1986)

- Hangul: 김종은
- RR: Gim Jongeun
- MR: Kim Chongŭn

Kim Jong-eun
Medal record

Women's field hockey

Representing South Korea

Asian Games
Gold medal – first place	2014 Incheon	Team
Silver medal – second place	2010 Guangzhou	Team

Asia Cup
Silver medal – second place	2007 Hong Kong	
Silver medal – second place	2013 Kuala Lumpur	
Bronze medal – third place	2009 Bangkok	
Bronze medal – third place	2017 Gifu	

Asian Champions Trophy
Gold medal – first place	2010 Busan	
Gold medal – first place	2011 Ordos	

Kim Jong-eun (Korean: 김종은; born 18 February 1986) is a South Korean field hockey player. At the 2008 and 2012 Summer Olympics she competed with the Korea women's national field hockey team in the women's tournament. She competed at the 2010 and 2014 Asian Games. Kim was born in Seoul, South Korea.

She won a gold medal as a member of the South Korean team at 2014 Asian Games.
