= Park Mi-hyun =

South Korean field hockey player

Personal information
- Born: 26 January 1986 (age 40) Seoul, South Korea
- Height: 1.61 m (5 ft 3 in)
- Weight: 62 kg (137 lb)

Sport
- Sport: Field hockey
- Position: Midfielder
- Club: KT
National team
Years	Team	Caps	Goals
–	South Korea	257	-
Medal record
Women's field hockey
Representing South Korea
Asian Games
Gold medal – first place	2014 Incheon	Team
Silver medal – second place	2010 Guangzhou	Team
Asia Cup
Silver medal – second place	2007 Hong Kong
Silver medal – second place	2013 Kuala Lumpur
Bronze medal – third place	2009 Bangkok
Bronze medal – third place	2017 Gifu
Asian Champions Trophy
Gold medal – first place	2010 Busan
Gold medal – first place	2011 Ordos
Gold medal – first place	2018 Donghae

- Park Mi-hyun
- Hangul: 박미현
- RR: Bak Mihyeon
- MR: Pak Mihyŏn

Park Mi-hyun (Korean: 박미현; born 26 January 1986) is a South Korean field hockey player. She was a member of the South Korea women's national field hockey team that competed in the women's tournament at the 2004, 2008 and 2012 Summer Olympics. She has also competed at the 2006, 2010 and 2014 Asian Games, winning the gold medal at the 2014 Asian Games.
