= Lee Seon-ok =

South Korean field hockey player

Medal record

Women's field hockey

Representing South Korea

Asian Games
Silver medal – second place	2002 Busan	Team
Silver medal – second place	2010 Guangzhou	Team

Asian Champions Trophy
Gold medal – first place	2010 Busan	

Lee Seon-ok (born 2 February 1981) is a South Korean field hockey player. At the 2008 and 2012 Summer Olympics she competed with the Korea women's national field hockey team in the women's tournament.
