= Song Qingling (field hockey) =

Chinese field hockey player

Song Qingling 宋清龄 宋清齡
Personal information
- Born: 22 July 1986 (age 39) Liaoning Province
Medal record
Women's field hockey
Representing China
Olympic Games
Silver medal – second place	2008 Beijing	Team
Asian Games
Gold medal – first place	2010 Guangzhou	Team
Silver medal – second place	2014 Incheon	Team
Asia Cup
Gold medal – first place	2009 Bangkok
Bronze medal – third place	2007 Hong Kong
Asian Champions Trophy
Silver medal – second place	2011 Ordos

Song Qingling (Chinese: 宋清龄; pinyin: Sòng Qīnglíng; born 22 July 1986 in Liaoning Province) is a field hockey player from China. She won a silver medal with the national women's hockey team at the 2008 Summer Olympics in Beijing.

She won a silver medal as a member of the Chinese team at 2014 Asian Games.
