= Ma Yibo =

Chinese field hockey player (born 1980)

Personal information
- Born: August 8, 1980 (age 45) Dalian, Liaoning
Medal record
Women's field hockey
Representing China
Olympic Games
Silver medal – second place	2008 Beijing	Team
Asian Games
Gold medal – first place	2002 Busan	Team
Gold medal – first place	2006 Doha	Team
Gold medal – first place	2010 Guangzhou	Team
Asia Cup
Gold medal – first place	2009 Bangkok
Bronze medal – third place	2004 New Delhi
Bronze medal – third place	2007 Hong Kong
Asian Champions Trophy
Silver medal – second place	2011 Ordos
Champions Trophy
Silver medal – second place	2003 Sydney

Ma Yibo (simplified Chinese: 马弋博; traditional Chinese: 馬弋博; pinyin: Mǎ Yìbó; born August 8, 1980, in Dalian, Liaoning) is a Chinese field hockey player who competed at the 2004, 2008 and 2012 Summer Olympics.

At the 2004 Summer Olympics, she finished fourth with the Chinese team in the women's competition. She played all six matches and scored two goals.

She was part of the Chinese team that won silver at the 2008 Beijing Olympics.

She was the top goal scorer for China at the 2006 Women's Hockey Champions Trophy, and again at the 2011 Women's Asian Champions Trophy. Her team ended as the runners-up on both occasions.
