= Fu Baorong =

Chinese field hockey player

Personal information
- Born: June 3, 1978 (age 48) Jilin City, Jilin
Medal record
Women's field hockey
Representing China
Olympic Games
Silver medal – second place	2008 Beijing	Team
Asian Games
Gold medal – first place	2002 Busan	Team
Gold medal – first place	2006 Doha	Team
Gold medal – first place	2010 Guangzhou	Team
Bronze medal – third place	1998 Bangkok	Team
Asia Cup
Gold medal – first place	2009 Bangkok
Asian Champions Trophy
Silver medal – second place	2011 Ordos
Champions Trophy
Silver medal – second place	2003 Sydney

Fu Baorong (simplified Chinese: 付宝荣; traditional Chinese: 付寶榮; pinyin: Fù Bǎoróng; born June 3, 1978, in Jilin City, Jilin) is a Chinese former field hockey player who competed at the 2004 Summer Olympics. She finished fourth with the Chinese team in the women's competition. She played all six matches and scored three goals.

She competed for the Chinese team at the 2008 Olympic Games, where the team won the silver medal, and at the 2012 Summer Olympics, where they were placed 6th.
