= 2010 Women's Asian Champions Trophy =

Field hockey tournament

Tournament details
- Host country: South Korea
- City: Busan
- Dates: 27–31 July
- Teams: 4 (from 1 confederation)

Final positions
- Champions: South Korea (1st title)
- Runner-up: Japan
- Third place: India

Tournament statistics
- Matches played: 8
- Goals scored: 29 (3.63 per match)
- Top scorer(s): Kaori Chiba; Wang Mengyu (3 goals)

The 2010 Asian Women's Hockey Champions Trophy was the inaugural edition of the Women's Asian Champions Trophy. The tournament was held in Busan, South Korea. The top four Asian teams (China, India, Japan, and South Korea) participated in the tournament which involved round-robin league among all teams followed by play-offs for final positions.

== Umpires ==
Six umpires were selected to officiate at the tournament:

- Nirmla Dagar (IND)
- Nor Piza Hassan (MAS)
- Kang Hyun-hee (KOR)
- Kim Jung-hee (KOR)
- Liu Lijie (CHN)
- Kitty Yau (HKG)

== Results ==
All times are South Korea Standard Time (UTC+8)

=== Round robin ===
Pos	Team	Pld	W	D	L	GF	GA	GD	Pts	Qualification
1	South Korea (H)	3	2	1	0	8	5	+3	7	Advanced to Final
2	Japan	3	1	2	0	7	6	+1	5	Advanced to Final
3	China	3	1	1	1	8	4	+4	4	
4	India	3	0	0	3	6	14	−8	0	

Source: FIH
Rules for classification: 1) points; 2) goal difference; 3) goals scored; 4) head-to-head result.
(H) Hosts

27 July 2010
11:35

Japan	3–2	India
Chiba 9', 67'; Yamamoto 34'	Report	Surinder 4'; Saba 15'

Umpires:
Kim Jung-Hee (KOR)
Liu Lijie (CHN)

27 July 2010
14:05

South Korea	1–0	China
Kim B. 9'	Report

Umpires:
Nor Piza Hassan (MAS)
Kitty Yau (HKG)

28 July 2010
11:35

India	1–6	China
Deepika 43'	Report	Ma 20'; Zhao 24', 70'; Wang M. 33'; Wang Z. 39'; Li H. 54'

Umpires:
Kang Hyun-Hee (KOR)
Kitty Yau (HKG)

28 July 2010
14:05

South Korea	2–2	Japan
Cheon 58', 63'	Report	Chiba 14'; Komazawa 25'

Umpires:
Liu Lijie (CHN)
Nor Piza Hassan (MAS)

30 July 2010
10:05

China	2–2	Japan
Wang M. 1', 12'	Report	Arai 8'; Nakagawa 51'

Umpires:
Kang Hyun-Hee (KOR)
Nirmla Dagar (IND)

30 July 2010
12:35

South Korea	5–3	India
Kim Jong-E. 29', 63'; Kim Jong-H. 30'; Park M. 53'; Lee S. 61'	Report	Saba 11'; Rani 55'; Subhadra 67'

Umpires:
Liu Lijie (CHN)
Kitty Yau (HKG)

=== Classification round ===
==== Third place game ====
31 July 2010
10:05

China	1–2	India
Wang M. 16'	Report	Saba 24'; Surinder 63'

Umpires:
Kim Jung-Hee (KOR)
Nor Piza Hassan (MAS)

==== Final ====
31 July 2010
12:35

South Korea	2–1	Japan
Kim Bo-mi; Kim Eun-sil	Report	?

Umpires:
Nirmla Dagar (IND)
Kitty Yau (HKG)

== Final standings ==
1. South Korea
2. Japan
3. India
4. China
