= 2011 Women's Asian Champions Trophy =

Field hockey tournament

Tournament details
- Host country: China
- City: Ordos
- Dates: 4–10 September
- Teams: 4 (from 1 confederation)

Final positions
- Champions: South Korea (2nd title)
- Runner-up: China
- Third place: Japan

Tournament statistics
- Matches played: 8
- Goals scored: 35 (4.38 per match)
- Top scorer: (China) Ma Yibo (4 goals)

The 2011 Asian Women's Hockey Champions Trophy was the 2nd edition of the Women's Asian Champions Trophy, a biennial women's international field hockey tournament organized by the Asian Hockey Federation. The tournament was held alongside the men's tournament in Ordos, China from 4 to 10 September 2011.

The top four Asian teams (China, India, Japan, and South Korea) participated in the tournament which involved round-robin league among all teams followed by play-offs for final positions. South Korea became the champions without losing a match. China also did not drop any point and finished as runners-up on goal difference. Japan clinched the third position. India finished in the last place after they lost every single one of their matches, and scoring only one goal and conceding 13.

== Umpires ==
Five umpires were selected to officiate at the tournament:

Neutral Umpires

- Caroline Brunekreef (NED)

Umpires

- Nirmla Dagar (IND)
- Nor Piza Hassan (MAS)
- Kang Hyun-young (KOR)
- Liu Xiaoying (CHN)

== Results ==
All times are China Standard Time (UTC+8)

=== Round robin ===
Pos	Team	Pld	W	D	L	GF	GA	GD	Pts	Qualification
1	China (H)	3	2	1	0	9	7	+2	7	Final
2	South Korea	3	2	1	0	7	3	+4	7	Final
3	Japan	3	1	0	2	5	4	+1	3	Third place game
4	India	3	0	0	3	1	13	−12	0	Third place game

Source: FIH
(H) Hosts

4 September 2011
11:00

China	3–0	Japan
Zhao YD 4'; Fu BR; Sun SN 31'	Report

Umpires:
Kang Hyun-young (KOR)
Nor Piza Hassan (MAS)

4 September 2011
13:00

South Korea	4–1	India
Kim J-e 19'; Park M-h 37'; Cheon S-k 55', 69'	Report	J Kaur 61'

Umpires:
Liu Xiaoying (CHN)
Caroline Brunekreef (NED)

6 September 2011
17:00

South Korea	2–2	China
Kim J-h 31', 47'	Report	Ma YB 56'; Fu BR 60'

Umpires:
Nirmla Dagar (IND)
Caroline Brunekreef (NED)

6 September 2011
19:00

Japan	5–0	India
Y Yamamoto 16'; R Komazawa 21', 43'; I Tanaka 52'; T Tsukui 69'	Report

Umpires:
Kang Hyun-young (KOR)
Nor Piza Hassan (MAS)

8 September 2011
15:00

Japan	0–1	South Korea
	Report	Cheon S-k 14'

Umpires:
Nirmla Dagar (IND)
Liu Xiaoying (CHN)

8 September 2011
17:00

China	4–0	India
Zhao YD 6', 66'; Ma YB 23', 65'	Report

Umpires:
Caroline Brunekreef (NED)
Nor Piza Hassan (MAS)

=== Classification ===
==== Third place game ====
10 September 2011
15:00

Japan	3–2 (a.e.t.)	India
R Komazawa 52'; K Fujio 63'; A Murakami 76'	Report	V Katariya 7'; Rani 28'

Umpires:
Kang Hyun-young (KOR)
Liu Xiaoying (CHN)

==== Final ====
5 September 2011
17:00

China	3–5	South Korea
Ma YB 12'; Fu BR 18'; Gao LH 48'	Report	Kim O-j 19'; Cheon E-b 23'; Kim J-e 44'; Kim J-h 45'; Park M-h 64'

Umpires:
Caroline Brunekreef (NED)
Nor Piza Hassan (MAS)

== Final standings ==
1. South Korea
2. China
3. Japan
4. India

== See also ==
- 2011 Men's Asian Champions Trophy
