= Field hockey at the 2016 Summer Olympics =

Field hockey at the Games of the XXXI Olympiad
- Venue: Olympic Hockey Centre
- Dates: 6–19 August 2016
- No. of events: 2

Field hockey at the 2016 Summer Olympics in Rio de Janeiro took place from 6 to 19 August at the Olympic Hockey Centre in Deodoro. The competition had instituted several changes in the format and structure from the 2012 Summer Olympics. Twenty-four teams (twelve each for men and women) competed in the tournament.

== Competition schedule ==
The match schedule of the men's tournament was unveiled on 27 April 2016.

G	Group stage	¼	Quarter-finals	½	Semi-finals	B	Bronze medal match	F	Gold medal match

Date Event	Sat 6	Sun 7	Mon 8	Tue 9	Wed 10	Thu 11	Fri 12	Sat 13	Sun 14	Mon 15	Tue 16	Wed 17	Thu 18		Fri 19	
Men	G	G	G	G	G	G	G		¼		½		B	F		
Women	G	G	G		G	G	G	G		¼		½			B	F

== Format changes ==
On 20 March 2014, the International Hockey Federation (FIH) instituted the changes to the match format, reducing from two 35-minute halves to four 15-minute quarters, with 2 minutes' rest after each period, and 15 at halftime. The purpose of the changes aims to improve the flow and intensity of the competition, and reinforce fan experience and opportunity for game presentation and analysis. Other changes include the implementation of 40-second time outs following both penalty corner awards and the scoring of a goal. Both interruptions and time outs must assure that the 60-minute game time is escalated for actual tournament and not depleted with a penalty corner set up, especially when the ball is not in play. Games ending in ties in knockout rounds are decided by penalty shootouts, as overtime was abolished in 2013.

According to Leandro Negre, president of FIH, “The decision today demonstrates our commitment to fan engagement. With the additional breaks, fans will have the opportunity to enjoy more replays and be more engaged with the event, whether in the stadium or watching from afar, while hockey commentators will be allowed more time to provide sport analysis between plays. In addition, coaches and players will see improvement in their performance with the additional opportunities to re-hydrate and re-strategize.”

== Qualification ==
=== Men's qualification ===
Each of the Continental Champions from five confederations received an automatic berth. Brazil, as the host nation, qualified automatically but with a rider: due to the relatively low standard of field hockey in Brazil, the International Hockey Federation (FIH) and the International Olympic Committee (IOC) required Brazil to place higher than thirtieth in the FIH World Rankings by the end of 2014 or finish no worse than sixth at the 2015 Pan American Games in order to qualify as host nation. They achieved this by beating the United States on a penalty shoot-out in their quarterfinal, thus ensuring a top four finish.

In addition, the six highest placed teams at the Semifinals of the 2014–15 FIH Hockey World League not already qualified received the remaining berths in this tournament.

Dates	Event	Location	Qualifier
20 September – 2 October 2014	2014 Asian Games	Incheon, South Korea	India
3–14 June 2015	2014–15 FIH Hockey World League Semifinals	Buenos Aires, Argentina	Germany
3–14 June 2015	2014–15 FIH Hockey World League Semifinals	Buenos Aires, Argentina	Canada
3–14 June 2015	2014–15 FIH Hockey World League Semifinals	Buenos Aires, Argentina	Spain
3–14 June 2015	2014–15 FIH Hockey World League Semifinals	Buenos Aires, Argentina	New Zealand
20 June – 5 July 2015	2014–15 FIH Hockey World League Semifinals	Antwerp, Belgium	Belgium
20 June – 5 July 2015	2014–15 FIH Hockey World League Semifinals	Antwerp, Belgium	Great Britain
20 June – 5 July 2015	2014–15 FIH Hockey World League Semifinals	Antwerp, Belgium	Ireland
21 July 2015	Host nation	Toronto, Canada	Brazil
14–25 July 2015	2015 Pan American Games	Toronto, Canada	Argentina
21–29 August 2015	2015 EuroHockey Nations Championship	(United Kingdom) London, England	Netherlands
21–25 October 2015	2015 Oceania Cup	Stratford, New Zealand	Australia
23 October – 1 November 2015	2015 African Qualifying Tournament	Randburg, South Africa	— (Note: South Africa won the continental qualifier however the team did not participate in the 2016 Olympics. South African Sports Confederation and Olympic Committee (SASCOC) and South African Hockey Association (SAHA) made an agreement on the Rio 2016 Olympics qualification criteria that the Continental Qualification route would not be considered. As a result, New Zealand, as the highest-ranked team from the 2014-15 Hockey World League Semifinals not already qualified, participated instead.)
Total			12

=== Women's qualification ===
Each of the continental champions from five confederations received an automatic berth. The host nation did not qualify as they failed to place higher than fortieth in the FIH World Rankings by the end of 2014 nor finished or seventh at the 2015 Pan American Games, failing to even qualify for that tournament: this restriction was decided between the International Hockey Federation (FIH) and the International Olympic Committee (IOC) due to the relatively low standard of field hockey in Brazil. In addition, the seven highest placed teams at the Semifinals of the 2014–15 FIH Hockey World League not already qualified received the remaining berths in this tournament.

Date	Event	Location	Qualifier
20 September – 2 October 2014	2014 Asian Games	Incheon, South Korea	South Korea
10–21 June 2015	2014–15 FIH Hockey World League Semifinals	Valencia, Spain	China
10–21 June 2015	2014–15 FIH Hockey World League Semifinals	Valencia, Spain	Germany
10–21 June 2015	2014–15 FIH Hockey World League Semifinals	Valencia, Spain	Argentina
10–21 June 2015	2014–15 FIH Hockey World League Semifinals	Valencia, Spain	Spain (Note: South Africa won the continental qualifier however the team did not participate in the 2016 Olympics. South African Sports Confederation and Olympic Committee (SASCOC) and South African Hockey Association (SAHA) made an agreement on the Rio 2016 Olympics qualification criteria that the Continental Qualification route would not be considered. As a result, Spain, as the highest-ranked team from the 2014–15 Hockey World League Semifinals not already qualified, participated instead.)
20 June – 5 July 2015	2014–15 FIH Hockey World League Semifinals	Antwerp, Belgium	Netherlands
20 June – 5 July 2015	2014–15 FIH Hockey World League Semifinals	Antwerp, Belgium	New Zealand
20 June – 5 July 2015	2014–15 FIH Hockey World League Semifinals	Antwerp, Belgium	India
20 June – 5 July 2015	2014–15 FIH Hockey World League Semifinals	Antwerp, Belgium	Japan
13–24 July 2015	2015 Pan American Games	Toronto, Canada	United States
22–30 August 2015	2015 EuroHockey Nations Championship	London, England	Great Britain (Note: Competed as England)
21–25 October 2015	2015 Oceania Cup	Stratford, New Zealand	Australia
23 October – 1 November 2015	2015 African Qualifying Tournament	Randburg, South Africa	—
Total			12

== Men's competition ==
The competition consisted of two stages; a group stage followed by a knockout stage.

=== Group stage ===
Teams were divided into two groups of six nations, playing every team in their group once. Three points were awarded for a victory, one for a draw. The top four teams per group qualified for the quarter-finals.

==== Group A ====
Pos	Team	Pld	W	D	L	GF	GA	GD	Pts	Qualification
1	Belgium	5	4	0	1	21	5	+16	12	Quarter-finals
2	Spain	5	3	1	1	13	6	+7	10	Quarter-finals
3	Australia	5	3	0	2	13	4	+9	9	Quarter-finals
4	New Zealand	5	2	1	2	17	8	+9	7	Quarter-finals
5	Great Britain	5	1	2	2	14	10	+4	5	
6	Brazil (H)	5	0	0	5	1	46	−45	0	

Source: Rio2016
Rules for classification: 1) Points; 2) Matches won; 3) Goal difference; 4) Goals for; 5) Head-to-head result.
(H) Hosts

==== Group B ====
Pos	Team	Pld	W	D	L	GF	GA	GD	Pts	Qualification
1	Germany	5	4	1	0	17	10	+7	13	Quarter-finals
2	Netherlands	5	3	1	1	18	6	+12	10	Quarter-finals
3	Argentina	5	2	2	1	14	12	+2	8	Quarter-finals
4	India	5	2	1	2	9	9	0	7	Quarter-finals
5	Ireland	5	1	0	4	10	16	−6	3	
6	Canada	5	0	1	4	7	22	−15	1	

Source: Rio2016
Rules for classification: 1) Points; 2) Matches won; 3) Goal difference; 4) Goals for; 5) Head-to-head result.

=== Knockout stage ===
Quarter-finals
14 August
Belgium	3
India	1
14 August
Netherlands	4
Australia	0
14 August
Spain	1
Argentina	2
14 August
Germany	3
New Zealand	2

Semi-finals
16 August
Belgium	3
Netherlands	1
16 August
Argentina	5
Germany	2

Gold medal match
18 August
Belgium	2
Argentina	4
Bronze medal match
18 August
Netherlands	1 (3)
Germany (p.s.o.)	1 (4)

== Women's competition ==
The competition consisted of two stages; a group stage followed by a knockout stage.

=== Group stage ===
Teams were divided into two groups of six nations, playing every team in their group once. Three points were awarded for a victory, one for a draw. The top four teams per group qualified for the quarter-finals.

==== Group A ====
Pos	Team	Pld	W	D	L	GF	GA	GD	Pts	Qualification
1	Netherlands	5	4	1	0	13	1	+12	13	Quarter-finals
2	New Zealand	5	3	1	1	11	5	+6	10	Quarter-finals
3	Germany	5	2	1	2	6	6	0	7	Quarter-finals
4	Spain	5	2	0	3	6	12	−6	6	Quarter-finals
5	China	5	1	2	2	3	5	−2	5	
6	South Korea	5	0	1	4	3	13	−10	1	

Source: Rio2016
Rules for classification: 1) Points; 2) Matches won; 3) Goal difference; 4) Goals for; 5) Head-to-head result.

==== Group B ====
Pos	Team	Pld	W	D	L	GF	GA	GD	Pts	Qualification
1	Great Britain	5	5	0	0	12	4	+8	15	Quarter-finals
2	United States	5	4	0	1	14	5	+9	12	Quarter-finals
3	Australia	5	3	0	2	11	5	+6	9	Quarter-finals
4	Argentina	5	2	0	3	12	6	+6	6	Quarter-finals
5	Japan	5	0	1	4	3	16	−13	1	
6	India	5	0	1	4	3	19	−16	1	

Source: Rio2016
Rules for classification: 1) Points; 2) Matches won; 3) Goal difference; 4) Goals for; 5) Head-to-head result.

=== Knockout stage ===
Quarter-finals
15 August
Netherlands	3
Argentina	2
15 August
United States	1
Germany	2
15 August
New Zealand	4
Australia	2
15 August
Great Britain	3
Spain	1

Semi-finals
17 August
Netherlands (p.s.o.)	1 (4)
Germany	1 (3)
17 August
New Zealand	0
Great Britain	3

Gold medal match
19 August
Netherlands	3 (0)
Great Britain (p.s.o.)	3 (2)
Bronze medal match
19 August
Germany	2
New Zealand	1

== Medal summary ==
=== Medal table ===
Rank	Nation	Gold	Silver	Bronze	Total
1	Argentina	1	0	0	1
1	Great Britain	1	0	0	1
3	Belgium	0	1	0	1
3	Netherlands	0	1	0	1
5	Germany	0	0	2	2
Totals (5 entries)		2	2	2	6

=== Medalists ===
Event	Gold	Silver	Bronze
Men	Argentina; Juan Manuel Vivaldi; Gonzalo Peillat; Juan Ignacio Gilardi; Pedro Ibarra; Facundo Callioni; Lucas Rey; Matías Paredes; Joaquín Menini; Lucas Vila; Luca Masso; Ignacio Ortiz; Juan Martín López; Juan Manuel Saladino; Isidoro Ibarra; Matías Rey; Manuel Brunet; Agustín Mazzilli; Lucas Rossi	Belgium; Arthur Van Doren; John-John Dohmen; Florent van Aubel; Sebastien Dockier; Cédric Charlier; Gauthier Boccard; Emmanuel Stockbroekx; Thomas Briels; Felix Denayer; Vincent Vanasch; Simon Gougnard; Loïck Luypaert; Tom Boon; Jérôme Truyens; Elliot Van Strydonck; Tanguy Cosyns	Germany; Nicolas Jacobi; Matthias Müller; Linus Butt; Martin Häner; Moritz Trompertz; Mats Grambusch; Christopher Wesley; Timm Herzbruch; Tobias Hauke; Tom Grambusch; Christopher Rühr; Martin Zwicker; Moritz Fürste; Florian Fuchs; Timur Oruz; Niklas Wellen
Women	Great Britain; Maddie Hinch; Laura Unsworth; Crista Cullen; Hannah Macleod; Georgie Twigg; Helen Richardson-Walsh; Susannah Townsend; Kate Richardson-Walsh; Sam Quek; Alex Danson; Giselle Ansley; Sophie Bray; Hollie Webb; Shona McCallin; Lily Owsley; Nicola White	Netherlands; Joyce Sombroek; Xan de Waard; Kitty van Male; Laurien Leurink; Willemijn Bos; Marloes Keetels; Carlien Dirkse van den Heuvel; Kelly Jonker; Maria Verschoor; Lidewij Welten; Caia van Maasakker; Maartje Paumen; Naomi van As; Ellen Hoog; Margot van Geffen; Eva de Goede	Germany; Nike Lorenz; Selin Oruz; Anne Schröder; Lisa Schütze; Charlotte Stapenhorst; Katharina Otte; Janne Müller-Wieland; Hannah Krüger; Jana Teschke; Lisa Altenburg; Franzisca Hauke; Cécile Pieper; Marie Mävers; Annika Sprink; Julia Müller; Pia-Sophie Oldhafer; Kristina Reynolds
