= 2016 Women's Cape Town Summer Series =

International field hockey competition

Tournament details
- City: Cape Town, South Africa
- Dates: 20 February – 5 March
- Teams: 4 (from 3 confederations)
- Venue(s): Hartleyvale Stadium

Final positions
- Champions: Germany (1st title)
- Runner-up: India
- Third place: South Africa

Tournament statistics
- Matches played: 12
- Goals scored: 50 (4.17 per match)
- Top scorer(s): (Germany) Pia-Sophie Oldhafer (5 goals)

The 2016 Cape Town Summer Series was the first edition of the women's field hockey friendly series, comprising a number of test matches between the national teams of Germany, India, Scotland and the hosts, South Africa. The series was held at Hartleyvale Stadium in Cape Town, from 20 February to 5 March.

Germany finished in first place, topping the pool at the conclusion of the matches.

== Results ==
All times are local (SAST).

=== Standings ===
Pos	Team	Pld	W	D	L	GF	GA	GD	PCT	Result
1st place, gold medalist(s)	Germany	5	4	1	0	18	6	+12	.900	Champions
2nd place, silver medalist(s)	India	6	3	1	2	13	8	+5	.583	
3rd place, bronze medalist(s)	South Africa (H)	7	2	2	3	15	13	+2	.429	
4	Scotland	6	1	0	5	4	23	−19	.167	

Source: FIH
Rules for classification: 1) points; 2) goal difference; 3) games won; 4) head-to-head result.
(H) Hosts

=== Fixtures ===
20 February 2017
16:00

South Africa	0–1	India
	Report	Deepika 55'

Umpires:
Wanri Venter (RSA)
Claire Cowan (RSA)

21 February 2017
16:00

India	2–2	South Africa
Gurjit 24'; Grace 26'	Report	Marais 3'; Chamberlain 34'

Umpires:
Claire Cowan (RSA)
Wanri Venter (RSA)

24 February 2017
18:00

South Africa	2–1	Scotland
Manuel 2'; Britz 44'	Report	Merchant 55'

Umpires:
Chantelle Britz (RSA)
Wanri Venter (RSA)

25 February 2017
18:00

India	5–0	Scotland
Rani 37', 42'; Deepika 45'; Anuradha 54'; Gurjit 59'	Report

Umpires:
Claire Cowan (RSA)
Michelle Joubert (RSA)

27 February 2017
16:00

Scotland	1–8	South Africa
Condie 59'	Report	Chamberlain 18', 42'; Manuel 20'; Glasby 25'; Deetlefs 40'; Walraven 49'; Britz 53'; Marks 58'

Umpires:
Michelle Joubert (RSA)
Chantelle Britz (RSA)

27 February 2017
18:00

Germany	3–0	India
Haase 25'; Oldhafer 39'; Müller 44'	Report

Umpires:
Wanri Venter (RSA)
Claire Cowan (RSA)

28 February 2017
16:00

South Africa	0–1	Scotland
	Report	Collins 32'

Umpires:
Tanja Schafer (RSA)
Michelle Joubert (RSA)

28 February 2017
18:00

India	2–3	Germany
Sunita 4'; Anuradha 22'	Report	Schütze 19'; Krüger 27', 60'

Umpires:
Chantelle Britz (RSA)
Wanri Venter (RSA)

1 March 2017
18:00

Scotland	0–3	India
	Report	Rani 18'; Vandana 28'; Poonam 53'

Umpires:
Lyndal Robertson (RSA)
Tanja Schafer (RSA)

2 March 2017
18:00

Germany	5–1	Scotland
Oldhafer 16', 27'; Schütze 35'; Müller 52', 58'	Report	Merchant 7'

Umpires:
Andrea Nicholson (RSA)
Claire Cowan (RSA)

4 March 2017
17:00

South Africa	1–5	Germany
Britz 14'	Report	Oldhafer 6', 32'; Müller 23'; Lorenz 38'; Hoffmann 55'

Umpires:
Lyndal Robertson (RSA)
Andrea Nicholson (RSA)

5 March 2017
16:00

Germany	2–2	South Africa
Hauke 12'; Haase 36'	Report	Chamberlain 28'; Marks 57'

Umpires:
Andrea Nicholson (RSA)
Lyndal Robertson (RSA)

== Goalscorers ==
There were 50 goals scored in 12 matches, for an average of 4.17 goals per match.

5 goals

- (Germany) Pia-Sophie Oldhafer

4 goals

- (Germany) Julia Müller
- (South Africa) Dirkie Chamberlain

3 goals

- (India) Rani Rampal
- (South Africa) Tanya Britz

2 goals

- (Germany) Lydia Haase
- (Germany) Hannah Krüger
- (Germany) Lisa Schütze
- (India) Gurjit Kaur
- (India) Deepika Thakur
- (India) Anuradha Thokchom
- (Scotland) Rebecca Merchant
- (South Africa) Candice Manuel
- (South Africa) Toni Marks

1 goal

- (Germany) Franzisca Hauke
- (Germany) Eileen Hoffmann
- (Germany) Nike Lorenz
- (India) Deep Grace Ekka
- (India) Vandana Katariya
- (India) Sunita Lakra
- (India) Poonam Rani
- (Scotland) Robyn Collins
- (Scotland) Rebecca Condie
- (South Africa) Lisa-Marié Deetlefs
- (South Africa) Tarryn Glasby
- (South Africa) Marizen Marais
- (South Africa) Nicole Walraven
