= Hannah Macleod =

English field hockey player

Hannah Macleod MBE
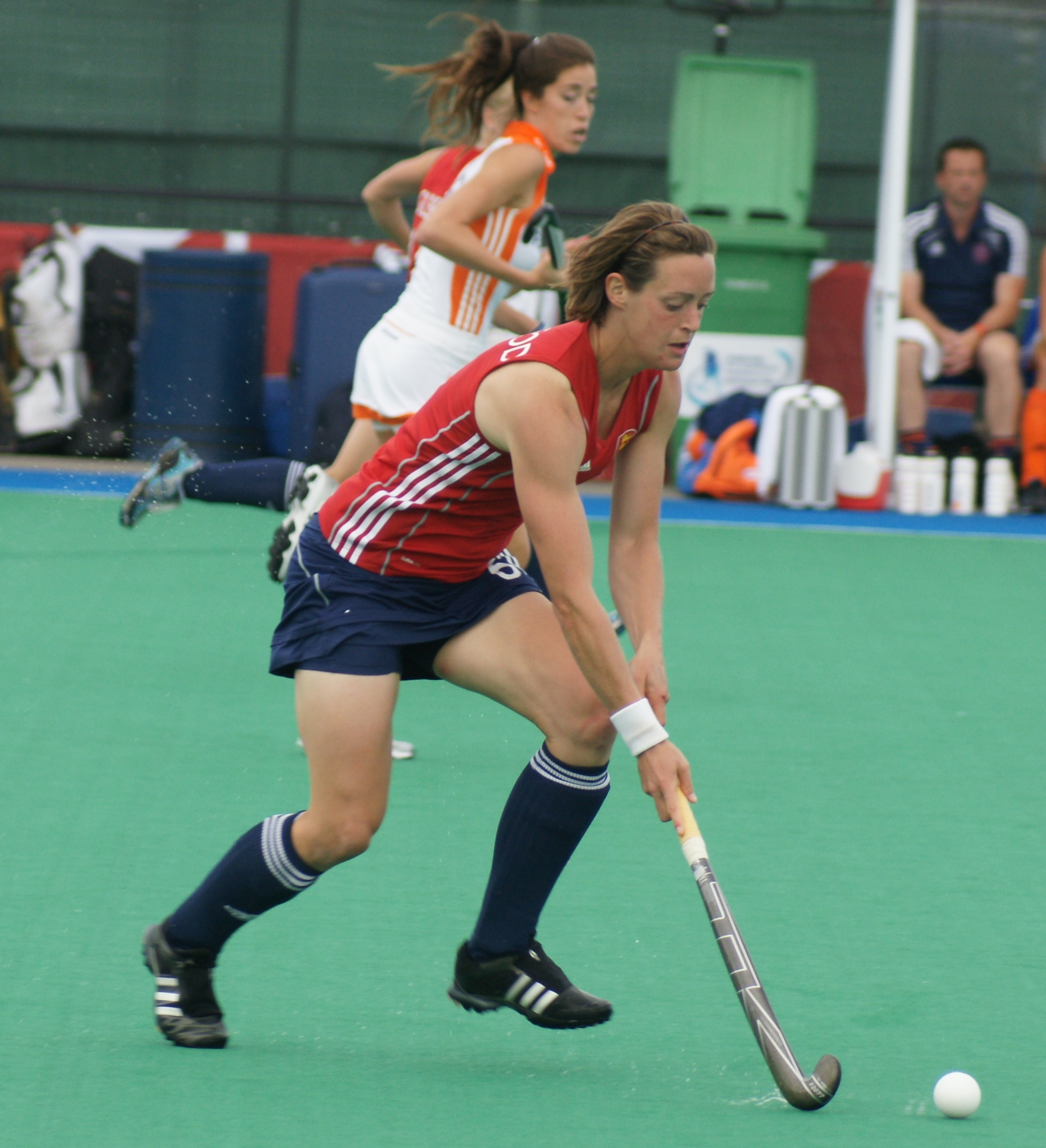

Personal information
- Full name: Hannah Louise Macleod
- Born: 9 June 1984 (age 42) Boston, Lincolnshire, England
- Height: 1.72 m (5 ft 8 in)
- Weight: 67 kg (148 lb)

Sport
- Sport: Field hockey
Medal record
Women's field hockey
Representing Great Britain
Olympic Games
Gold medal – first place	2016 Rio de Janeiro	Team
Bronze medal – third place	2012 London	Team
Representing England
European Championship
Gold medal – first place	2015 London

Hannah Louise Macleod (born 9 June 1984) is an English field hockey player.

Macleod began her youth career at St Ives Hockey Club, Cambridge, and rose up the ranks to play for their first team. She went on to play club hockey for St Albans, Leicester and Loughborough Students.

She made her international debut in 2003. She competed for the Great Britain at the 2012 Summer Olympics, helping the team win bronze.

In October 2012, the Olympic medals of Macleod and Alex Partridge were stolen along with their jackets during a night at Mahiki in London. The stolen medal was recovered when it was sent anonymously by mail to the headquarters of England Hockey.

In the 2016 Summer Olympics, Macleod played for the GB field hockey team again. The team won the gold medal.

Macleod attended Loughborough University where she achieved BSc Sport and Exercise Science in 2005. In 2018, the University awarded her an honorary doctorate.
