= Field hockey at the 2016 Summer Olympics – Women's tournament =

Women's field hockey at the 2016 Summer Olympics

Tournament details
- Host country: Brazil
- City: Rio de Janeiro
- Dates: 6–19 August 2016
- Teams: 12
- Venue: Olympic Hockey Centre

Final positions
- Champions: Great Britain (1st title)
- Runner-up: Netherlands
- Third place: Germany

Tournament statistics
- Matches played: 38
- Goals scored: 129 (3.39 per match)
- Top scorer(s): (United Kingdom) Alex Danson (Netherlands) Maartje Paumen (United States) Katie Bam (5 goals)

The women's field hockey tournament at the 2016 Summer Olympics was the tenth edition of the field hockey event for women at the Summer Olympics. It took place over a fourteen-day period beginning on 6 August, and culminating with the medal finals on 19 August. All games were played at the Olympic Hockey Centre in Deodoro, Rio de Janeiro, Brazil.

Great Britain won the gold medal for the first time after defeating defending champions the Netherlands 2–0 on a penalty shoot-out after a 3–3 draw. Germany won the bronze medal by defeating New Zealand 2–1.

The medals for the tournament were presented by Barry Maister, New Zealand; Camiel Eurlings, Netherlands; and Nicole Hoevertsz, Aruba; members of the International Olympic Committee, and the gifts were presented by Pam Elgar and Marijke Fleuren, executive board members of the International Hockey Federation and Leandro Negre, president of the International Hockey Federation.

== Competition schedule ==
The match schedule of the women's tournament was unveiled on 27 April 2016.

| G | Group stage | ¼ | Quarter-finals | ½ | Semi-finals | B | Bronze medal match | F | Final |

| Sat 6 | Sun 7 | Mon 8 | Tue 9 | Wed 10 | Thu 11 | Fri 12 | Sat 13 | Sun 14 | Mon 15 | Tue 16 | Wed 17 | Thu 18 | Fri 19 | |
|---|---|---|---|---|---|---|---|---|---|---|---|---|---|---|
| G | G | G | | G | G | G | G | | ¼ | | ½ | | B | F |

== Competition format ==
The twelve teams in the tournament were divided into two groups of six, with each team initially playing round-robin games within their group. Following the completion of the round-robin stage, the top four teams from each group advance to the quarter-finals. The two semi-final winners meet for the gold medal match, while the semi-final losers play in the bronze medal match.

== Qualification ==
Each of the continental champions from five confederations receive an automatic berth. The host nation didn't qualify as they didn't place higher than fortieth in the FIH World Rankings by the end of 2014 nor finished no worse than seventh at the 2015 Pan American Games (they didn't even qualify for that tournament). This restriction was decided between the International Hockey Federation (FIH) and the International Olympic Committee (IOC) due to the standard of field hockey in Brazil. In addition to the seven highest placed teams at the Semifinals of the 2014–15 FIH Hockey World League not already qualified, the following twelve teams, shown with final pre-tournament rankings, will compete in this tournament.

| Date | Event | Location | Qualifier |
|---|---|---|---|
| 20 September – 2 October 2014 | 2014 Asian Games | Incheon, South Korea | South Korea |
| 10–21 June 2015 | 2014–15 FIH Hockey World League Semifinals | Valencia, Spain | China |
| 10–21 June 2015 | 2014–15 FIH Hockey World League Semifinals | Valencia, Spain | Germany |
| 10–21 June 2015 | 2014–15 FIH Hockey World League Semifinals | Valencia, Spain | Argentina |
| 10–21 June 2015 | 2014–15 FIH Hockey World League Semifinals | Valencia, Spain | Spain (Note: South Africa won the continental qualifier however the team did not participate in the 2016 Olympics. South African Sports Confederation and Olympic Committee (SASCOC) and South African Hockey Association (SAHA) made an agreement on the Rio 2016 Olympics qualification criteria that the Continental Qualification route would not be considered. As a result, Spain, as the highest-ranked team from the 2014–15 Hockey World League Semifinals not already qualified, participated instead.) |
| 20 June – 5 July 2015 | 2014–15 FIH Hockey World League Semifinals | Antwerp, Belgium | Netherlands |
| 20 June – 5 July 2015 | 2014–15 FIH Hockey World League Semifinals | Antwerp, Belgium | New Zealand |
| 20 June – 5 July 2015 | 2014–15 FIH Hockey World League Semifinals | Antwerp, Belgium | India |
| 20 June – 5 July 2015 | 2014–15 FIH Hockey World League Semifinals | Antwerp, Belgium | Japan |
| 13–24 July 2015 | 2015 Pan American Games | Toronto, Canada | United States |
| 22–30 August 2015 | 2015 EuroHockey Nations Championship | London, England | Great Britain (Note: Competed as England) |
| 21–25 October 2015 | 2015 Oceania Cup | Stratford, New Zealand | Australia |
| 23 October – 1 November 2015 | 2015 African Qualifying Tournament | Randburg, South Africa | — |
| Total | | | 12 |

== Group stage ==
All times are local (UTC−3).

=== Group A ===
| Pos | Team | Pld | W | D | L | GF | GA | GD | Pts | Qualification |
|---|---|---|---|---|---|---|---|---|---|---|
| 1 | Netherlands | 5 | 4 | 1 | 0 | 13 | 1 | +12 | 13 | Quarter-finals |
| 2 | New Zealand | 5 | 3 | 1 | 1 | 11 | 5 | +6 | 10 | Quarter-finals |
| 3 | Germany | 5 | 2 | 1 | 2 | 6 | 6 | 0 | 7 | Quarter-finals |
| 4 | Spain | 5 | 2 | 0 | 3 | 6 | 12 | −6 | 6 | Quarter-finals |
| 5 | China | 5 | 1 | 2 | 2 | 3 | 5 | −2 | 5 | |
| 6 | South Korea | 5 | 0 | 1 | 4 | 3 | 13 | −10 | 1 | |

Source: Rio2016
Rules for classification: 1) Points; 2) Matches won; 3) Goal difference; 4) Goals for; 5) Head-to-head result.

7 August 2016
10:00

| New Zealand | 4–1 | South Korea |
|---|---|---|
| Pearce 10'; Harrison 19'; Flynn 21'; Webster 34' | Report | Kim H. 55' |

Umpires:
Fanneke Alkemade (NED)
Chieko Soma (JPN)

7 August 2016
12:30

| Netherlands | 5–0 | Spain |
|---|---|---|
| Welten 12'; Leurink 16'; Keetels 19'; Paumen 23', 49' | Report |

Umpires:
Amy Baxter (USA)
Amber Church (NZL)

7 August 2016
13:30

| China | 1–1 | Germany |
|---|---|---|
| Peng 28' | Report | Hahn 5' |

Umpires:
Melissa Trivic (AUS)
Sarah Wilson (GBR)

8 August 2016
13:30

| New Zealand | 1–2 | Germany |
|---|---|---|
| Webster 10' | Report | Oldhafer 22'; Schröder 44' |

Umpires:
Soledad Iparraguiree (ARG)
Miao Lin (CHN)

8 August 2016
17:00

| Netherlands | 4–0 | South Korea |
|---|---|---|
| Jonker 9', 30', 42'; Dirkse van den Heuvel 46' | Report |

Umpires:
Kelly Hudson (NZL)
Sarah Wilson (GBR)

8 August 2016
19:30

| Spain | 0–2 | China |
|---|---|---|
| | Report | Zhao 8'; Peng 25' |

Umpires:
Amber Church (NZL)
Michelle Meister (GER)

10 August 2016
10:00

| Spain | 1–2 | New Zealand |
|---|---|---|
| Petchame 60' | Report | Smith 22', 51' |

Umpires:
Irene Presenqui (ARG)
Elena Eskina (RUS)

10 August 2016
12:30

| Germany | 2–0 | South Korea |
|---|---|---|
| Krüger 55'; Hahn 59' | Report |

Umpires:
Michelle Joubert (RSA)
Kylie Seymour (AUS)

10 August 2016
18:00

| China | 0–1 | Netherlands |
|---|---|---|
| | Report | Van Male 59' |

Umpires:
Kelly Hudson (NZL)
Carolina de la Fuente (ARG)

11 August 2016
17:00

| Germany | 1–2 | Spain |
|---|---|---|
| Schütze 21' | Report | Guinea 9'; Salvatella 11' |

Umpires:
Fanneke Alkemade (NED)
Miao Lin (CHN)

12 August 2016
10:00

| South Korea | 0–0 | China |
|---|---|---|
| | Report |

Umpires:
Irene Presenqui (ARG)
Soledad Iparraguirre (ARG)

12 August 2016
11:00

| New Zealand | 1–1 | Netherlands |
|---|---|---|
| Whitelock 59' | Report | Paumen 28' |

Umpires:
Carolina de la Fuente (ARG)
Michelle Joubert (RSA)

13 August 2016
12:30

| Netherlands | 2–0 | Germany |
|---|---|---|
| De Waard 5'; Van Male 44' | Report |

Umpires:
Soledad Iparraguirre (ARG)
Melissa Trivic (AUS)

13 August 2016
17:00

| South Korea | 2–3 | Spain |
|---|---|---|
| Cheon 18'; Kim 55' | Report | Garcia 39'; Riera 41'; Comerma 48' |

Umpires:
Michelle Meister (GER)
Fanneke Alkemade (NED)

13 August 2016
20:30

| China | 0–3 | New Zealand |
|---|---|---|
| | Report | Merry 21'; Flynn 41'; McLaren 42' |

Umpires:
Amy Baxter (USA)
Kylie Seymour (AUS)

=== Group B ===
| Pos | Team | Pld | W | D | L | GF | GA | GD | Pts | Qualification |
|---|---|---|---|---|---|---|---|---|---|---|
| 1 | Great Britain | 5 | 5 | 0 | 0 | 12 | 4 | +8 | 15 | Quarter-finals |
| 2 | United States | 5 | 4 | 0 | 1 | 14 | 5 | +9 | 12 | Quarter-finals |
| 3 | Australia | 5 | 3 | 0 | 2 | 11 | 5 | +6 | 9 | Quarter-finals |
| 4 | Argentina | 5 | 2 | 0 | 3 | 12 | 6 | +6 | 6 | Quarter-finals |
| 5 | Japan | 5 | 0 | 1 | 4 | 3 | 16 | −13 | 1 | |
| 6 | India | 5 | 0 | 1 | 4 | 3 | 19 | −16 | 1 | |

Source: Rio2016
Rules for classification: 1) Points; 2) Matches won; 3) Goal difference; 4) Goals for; 5) Head-to-head result.

6 August 2016
17:00

| Argentina | 1–2 | United States |
|---|---|---|
| Merino 56' | Report | K. Reinprecht 35'; Kasold 50' |

Umpires:
Michelle Joubert (RSA)
Michelle Meister (GER)

6 August 2016
20:30

| Great Britain | 2–1 | Australia |
|---|---|---|
| Owsley 26'; Danson 43' | Report | Morgan 33' |

Umpires:
Laurine Delforge (BEL)
Irene Presenqui (ARG)

7 August 2016
11:00

| Japan | 2–2 | India |
|---|---|---|
| Nishikori 15'; Nakashima 28' | Report | Rani 31'; Minz 40' |

Umpires:
Kylie Seymour (AUS)
Kelly Hudson (NZL)

8 August 2016
10:00

| Australia | 1–2 | United States |
|---|---|---|
| Slattery 43' | Report | Vittese 25'; Van Sickle 41' |

Umpires:
Elena Eskina (RUS)
Carolina de la Fuente (ARG)

8 August 2016
18:00

| India | 0–3 | Great Britain |
|---|---|---|
| | Report | Ansley 25'; White 27'; Danson 33' |

Umpires:
Chieko Soma (JPN)
Amy Baxter (USA)

8 August 2016
20:30

| Argentina | 4–0 | Japan |
|---|---|---|
| Barrionuevo 13', 18'; Rebecchi 48'; Granatto 50' | Report |

Umpires:
Melissa Trivic (AUS)
Laurine Delforge (BEL)

10 August 2016
11:00

| India | 1–6 | Australia |
|---|---|---|
| Thokchom 60' | Report | Slattery 5'; Morgan 9'; Claxton 35'; Parker 36'; Kenny 43', 46' |

Umpires:
Soledad Iparraguiree (ARG)
Sarah Wilson (GBR)

10 August 2016
13:30

| Great Britain | 3–2 | Argentina |
|---|---|---|
| H. Richardson-Walsh 23', 25'; Bray 38' | Report | F. Habif 41', 42' |

Umpires:
Michelle Meister (GER)
Miao Lin (CHN)

10 August 2016
17:00

| United States | 6–1 | Japan |
|---|---|---|
| González 1'; Bam 5', 52', 60'; Reinprecht 29'; Witmer 37' | Report | Nakashima 47' |

Umpires:
Amber Church (NZL)
Fanneke Alkemade (NED)

11 August 2016
18:00

| Australia | 1–0 | Argentina |
|---|---|---|
| Smith 33' | Report |

Umpires:
Laurine Delforge (BEL)
Amy Baxter (USA)

11 August 2016
19:30

| United States | 3–0 | India |
|---|---|---|
| Bam 14', 42'; González 52' | Report |

Umpires:
Melissa Trivic (AUS)
Chieko Soma (JPN)

11 August 2016
20:30

| Japan | 0–2 | Great Britain |
|---|---|---|
| | Report | Owsley 5'; White 55' |

Umpires:
Kylie Seymour (AUS)
Elena Eskina (RUS)

13 August 2016
10:00

| Argentina | 5–0 | India |
|---|---|---|
| Cavallero 16', 29'; Granatto 23'; Rebecchi 26'; Albertarrio 27' | Report |

Umpires:
Chieko Soma (JPN)
Sarah Wilson (GBR)

13 August 2016
18:00

| Great Britain | 2–1 | United States |
|---|---|---|
| Bray 53'; Danson 56' | Report | Vittese 39' |

Umpires:
Amber Church (NZL)
Irene Presenqui (ARG)

13 August 2016
19:30

| Australia | 2–0 | Japan |
|---|---|---|
| Williams 17'; Smith 55' | Report |

Umpires:
Elena Eskina (RUS)
Kelly Hudson (NZL)

== Knockout stage ==
=== Bracket ===
Quarter-finals
15 August
Netherlands | 3
Argentina | 2
15 August
United States | 1
Germany | 2
15 August
New Zealand | 4
Australia | 2
15 August
Great Britain | 3
Spain | 1

Semi-finals
17 August
Netherlands (p.s.o.) | 1 (4)
Germany | 1 (3)
17 August
New Zealand | 0
Great Britain | 3

Gold medal match
19 August
Netherlands | 3 (0)
Great Britain (p.s.o.) | 3 (2)
Bronze medal match
19 August
Germany | 2
New Zealand | 1

=== Quarter-finals ===
15 August 2016
10:00

| New Zealand | 4–2 | Australia |
|---|---|---|
| McLaren 7'; Smith 24'; Flynn 39'; Merry 44' | Report | Slattery 33', 59' |

Umpires:
Irene Presenqui (ARG)
Sarah Wilson (GBR)

15 August 2016
12:30

| United States | 1–2 | Germany |
|---|---|---|
| Falgowski 57' | Report | Mävers 8'; Hahn 14' |

Umpires:
Carolina de la Fuente (ARG)
Miao Lin (CHN)

15 August 2016
18:00

| Great Britain | 3–1 | Spain |
|---|---|---|
| Twigg 8'; H. Richardson-Walsh 13'; Owsley 27' | Report | Oliva 53' |

Umpires:
Kelly Hudson (NZL)
Melissa Trivic (AUS)

15 August 2016
20:30

| Netherlands | 3–2 | Argentina |
|---|---|---|
| Welten 5'; Leurink 25'; Jonker 47' | Report | F. Habif 41'; Merino 53' |

Umpires:
Michelle Joubert (RSA)
Laurine Delforge (BEL)

=== Semi-finals ===
17 August 2016
12:00

| Netherlands | 1–1 | Germany |
|---|---|---|
| Paumen 16' | Report | Schütze 11' |
Penalties
| Bos (penalty shoot-out scored); Hoog (penalty shoot-out missed); Keetels (penalty shoot-out missed); Van Geffen (penalty shoot-out scored); Jonker (penalty shoot-out missed); Bos (penalty shoot-out scored); Hoog (penalty shoot-out scored) | 4–3 | (penalty shoot-out scored) Müller-Wieland; (penalty shoot-out scored) Mävers; (penalty shoot-out missed) Hahn; (penalty shoot-out missed) Teschke; (penalty shoot-out missed) Hauke; (penalty shoot-out scored) Müller-Wieland; (penalty shoot-out missed) Mävers |

Umpires:
Laurine Delforge (BEL)
Soledad Iparraguiree (ARG)

17 August 2016
17:00

| New Zealand | 0–3 | Great Britain |
|---|---|---|
| | Report | Danson 22', 52'; H. Richardson-Walsh 48' |

Umpires:
Carolina de la Fuente (ARG)
Michelle Joubert (RSA)

=== Bronze medal match ===
19 August 2016
12:00

| Germany | 2–1 | New Zealand |
|---|---|---|
| Stapenhorst 34'; Schütze 38' | Report | Merry 45+' |

Umpires:
Irene Presenqui (ARG)
Sarah Wilson (GBR)

=== Gold medal match ===
19 August 2016
17:00

| Netherlands | 3–3 | Great Britain |
|---|---|---|
| Van Male 16', 37'; Paumen 25' | Report | Owsley 10'; Cullen 26'; White 52' |
Penalties
| Bos (penalty shoot-out missed); Hoog (penalty shoot-out missed); Leurink (penalty shoot-out missed); Van Geffen (penalty shoot-out missed) | 0–2 | (penalty shoot-out missed) H. Richardson-Walsh; (penalty shoot-out missed) Danson; (penalty shoot-out scored) Bray; (penalty shoot-out missed) Unsworth; (penalty shoot-out scored) Webb |

Umpires:
Michelle Joubert (RSA)
Laurine Delforge (BEL)

== Final ranking ==
As per statistical convention in field hockey, matches decided in extra time are counted as wins and losses, while matches decided by penalty shoot-outs are counted as draws.

| Pos | Team | Pld | W | D | L | GF | GA | GD | Pts | Final result |
|---|---|---|---|---|---|---|---|---|---|---|
| 1st place, gold medalist(s) | Great Britain | 8 | 7 | 1 | 0 | 21 | 8 | +13 | 22 | Gold medal |
| 2nd place, silver medalist(s) | Netherlands | 8 | 5 | 3 | 0 | 20 | 7 | +13 | 18 | Silver medal |
| 3rd place, bronze medalist(s) | Germany | 8 | 4 | 2 | 2 | 11 | 9 | +2 | 14 | Bronze medal |
| 4 | New Zealand | 8 | 4 | 1 | 3 | 16 | 12 | +4 | 13 | Fourth place |
| 5 | United States | 6 | 4 | 0 | 2 | 15 | 7 | +8 | 12 | Eliminated in quarter-finals |
| 6 | Australia | 6 | 3 | 0 | 3 | 13 | 9 | +4 | 9 | Eliminated in quarter-finals |
| 7 | Argentina | 6 | 2 | 0 | 4 | 14 | 9 | +5 | 6 | Eliminated in quarter-finals |
| 8 | Spain | 6 | 2 | 0 | 4 | 7 | 15 | −8 | 6 | Eliminated in quarter-finals |
| 9 | China | 5 | 1 | 2 | 2 | 3 | 5 | −2 | 5 | Eliminated in group stage |
| 10 | Japan | 5 | 0 | 1 | 4 | 3 | 16 | −13 | 1 | Eliminated in group stage |
| 11 | South Korea | 5 | 0 | 1 | 4 | 3 | 13 | −10 | 1 | Eliminated in group stage |
| 12 | India | 5 | 0 | 1 | 4 | 3 | 19 | −16 | 1 | Eliminated in group stage |

Source: Rio2016

The medallists were:

| Medal | Name |
|---|---|
| Gold | Great Britain women's field hockey team: Maddie Hinch; Laura Unsworth; Crista Cullen; Hannah Macleod; Georgie Twigg; Helen Richardson-Walsh; Susannah Townsend; Kate Richardson-Walsh; Sam Quek; Alex Danson; Giselle Ansley; Sophie Bray; Hollie Webb; Shona McCallin; Lily Owsley; Nicola White |
| Silver | Netherlands women's national field hockey team: Naomi van As; Willemijn Bos; Carlien Dirkse van den Heuvel; Margot van Geffen; Eva de Goede; Ellen Hoog; Kelly Jonker; Marloes Keetels; Laurien Leurink; Caia van Maasakker; Kitty van Male; Maartje Paumen; Joyce Sombroek; Maria Verschoor; Xan de Waard; Lidewij Welten |
| Bronze | Germany women's national field hockey team: Lisa Hahn; Franzisca Hauke; Hannah Krüger; Nike Lorenz; Marie Mävers; Julia Müller; Janne Müller-Wieland; Pia-Sophie Oldhafer; Selin Oruz; Katharina Otte; Cécile Pieper; Kristina Reynolds; Anne Schröder; Lisa Schütze; Annika Sprink; Charlotte Stapenhorst; Jana Teschke |

== Goalscorers ==
There were 129 goals scored in 38 matches, for an average of 3.39 goals per match.

5 goals

- (United Kingdom) Alex Danson
- (Netherlands) Maartje Paumen
- (United States) Katie Bam

4 goals

- (Australia) Kathryn Slattery
- (United Kingdom) Lily Owsley
- (United Kingdom) Helen Richardson-Walsh
- (Netherlands) Kelly Jonker
- (Netherlands) Kitty van Male

3 goals

- (Argentina) Florencia Habif
- (Germany) Lisa Altenburg
- (Germany) Lisa Schütze
- (United Kingdom) Nicola White
- (New Zealand) Gemma Flynn
- (New Zealand) Olivia Merry
- (New Zealand) Kelsey Smith

2 goals

- (Argentina) Noel Barrionuevo
- (Argentina) Carla Rebecchi
- (Argentina) Martina Cavallero
- (Argentina) Delfina Merino
- (Argentina) María Granatto
- (Australia) Georgina Morgan
- (Australia) Jodie Kenny
- (Australia) Emily Smith
- (China) Peng Yang
- (United Kingdom) Sophie Bray
- (Japan) Mie Nakashima
- (Netherlands) Laurien Leurink
- (Netherlands) Lidewij Welten
- (New Zealand) Anita McLaren
- (New Zealand) Petrea Webster
- (United States) Melissa González
- (United States) Katie Reinprecht
- (United States) Michelle Vittese

1 goal

- (Argentina) Agustina Albertario
- (Australia) Jane Claxton
- (Australia) Georgie Parker
- (Australia) Mariah Williams
- (China) Zhao Yudiao
- (Germany) Hannah Krüger
- (Germany) Marie Mävers
- (Germany) Pia-Sophie Oldhafer
- (Germany) Anne Schröder
- (Germany) Charlotte Stapenhorst
- (United Kingdom) Giselle Ansley
- (United Kingdom) Crista Cullen
- (United Kingdom) Georgie Twigg
- (India) Lilima Minz
- (India) Rani Rampal
- (India) Anuradha Thokchom
- (Japan) Emi Nishikori
- (Netherlands) Xan de Waard
- (Netherlands) Carlien Dirkse van den Heuvel
- (Netherlands) Marloes Keetels
- (New Zealand) Charlotte Harrison
- (New Zealand) Kirsten Pearce
- (New Zealand) Kayla Whitelock
- (South Korea) Cheon Eun-bi
- (South Korea) Kim Bo-mi
- (South Korea) Kim Hyun-ji
- (Spain) Gloria Comerma
- (Spain) Begoña García
- (Spain) Cristina Guinea
- (Spain) Georgina Oliva
- (Spain) Carlota Petchamé
- (Spain) Lola Riera
- (Spain) Carola Salvatella
- (United States) Katelyn Falgowski
- (United States) Michelle Kasold
- (United States) Caitlin Van Sickle
- (United States) Jill Witmer
