= Joyce Sombroek =

Dutch field hockey player

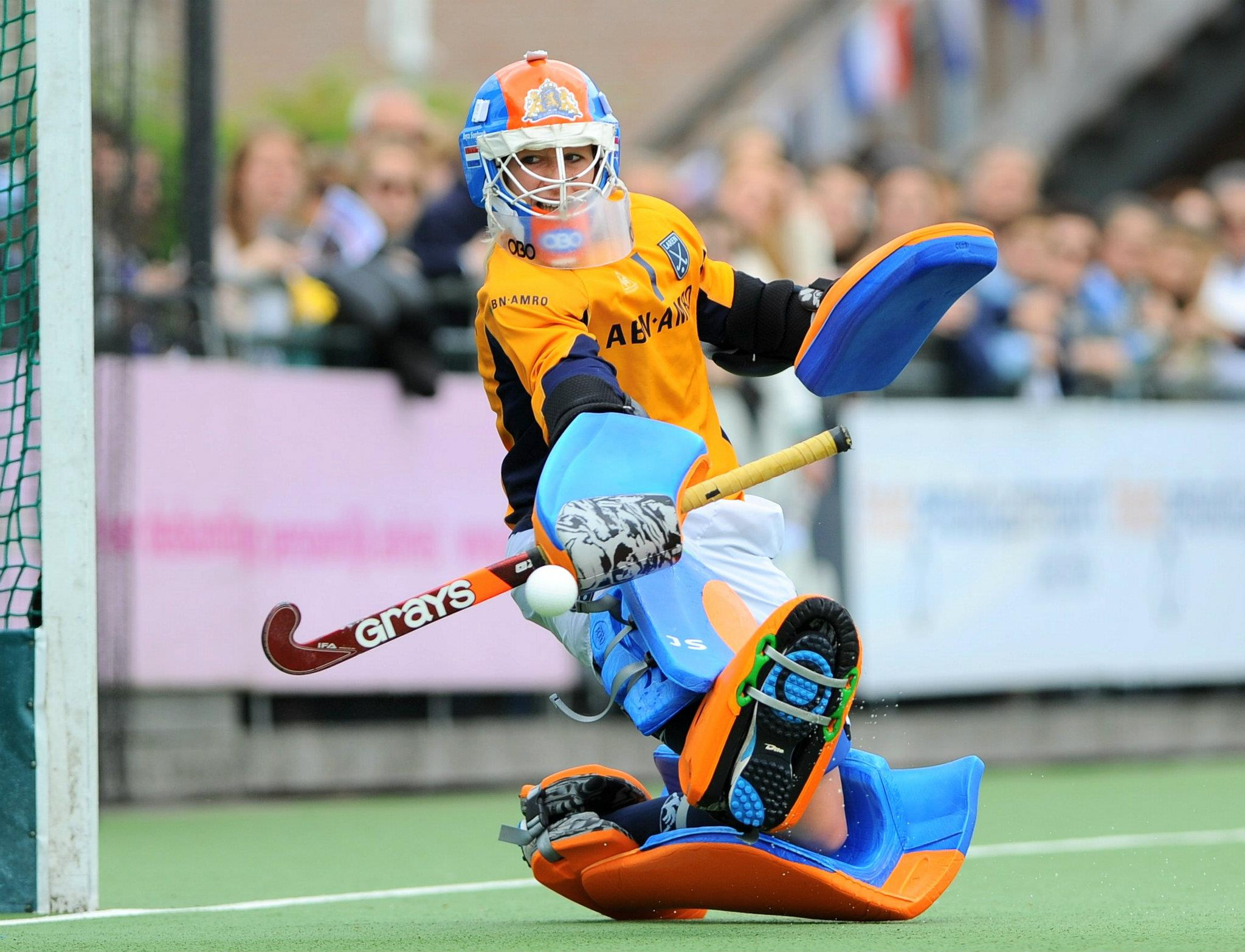

Personal information
- Born: 10 September 1990 (age 36) Alkmaar, Netherlands
- Height: 1.79 m (5 ft 10 in)
- Weight: 64 kg (141 lb)

Sport
- Sport: Field hockey
Senior career
Years	Team	Caps	Goals
–	Lochemse Hockey Club	-	-
–	Schaerweijde	-	-
–	Mixed Hockey Club Laren	-	-
National team
Years	Team	Caps	Goals
2010–2016	Netherlands	117	-
Medal record
Women's field hockey
Representing Netherlands
Olympic Games
Gold medal – first place	2012 London	Team
Silver medal – second place	2016 Rio de Janeiro	Team
World Cup
Gold medal – first place	2014 The Hague
Silver medal – second place	2010 Rosario
European Championship
Gold medal – first place	2011 Gladbach
Silver medal – second place	2015 London
Bronze medal – third place	2013 Boom
Champions Trophy
Gold medal – first place	2011 Amsterdam
Silver medal – second place	2010 Nottingham
Silver medal – second place	2015 London
Silver medal – second place	2016 London
Bronze medal – third place	2012 Rosario
Bronze medal – third place	2014 Mendoza

Joyce Sombroek (born 10 September 1990) is a former Dutch field hockey goalkeeper of the Netherlands national team. Her international debut was on 29 June 2010 and in total she played international 117 matches (2 February 2017). With the Dutch national team Sombroek won every title a professional field hockey player can win. Her biggest achievements are the gold medal at the 2012 Summer Olympics, silver medal at the 2016 Rio de Janeiro and winning the 2014 Women's Hockey World Cup in The Hague. In both Olympic semi-finals Sombroek played an important role by stopping multiple shoot-outs and leading her team into the finals. Sombroek also won several individual titles. The Féderation Internationale de Hockey (FIH) chose her for the international All Star team in 2010 and 2011 and Sombroek was nominated for Best Young Player of the World in 2012. She was also chosen as Best Goalkeeper in the World in 2014 and 2015.

In the highest National league of the Netherlands, the Hoofdklasse, she became vice-champion of the Netherlands in 2010, 2011 and 2012 with the first ladies team of Hockeyclub Laren. In this competition Sombroek got named 'Talent of the year' in 2010 and 'Best player of the year' in 2012. At the EuroHockey Club Champions Cup she and her teammates won a bronze medal in 2011, a gold medal in 2012 and a silver medal in 2013. Her last titles were the National Indoor Championships in 2018 and the EuroHockey Indoor Championships in 2019 in Hamburg.

Sombroek combined her career as a professional athlete with her medicine studies at the Vrije Universiteit in Amsterdam and is now working as a doctor. She also regularly gives presentations and is a devoted ambassador for several charities.
