= Sophie Bray =

English field hockey player (born 1990)

Sophie Bray MBE
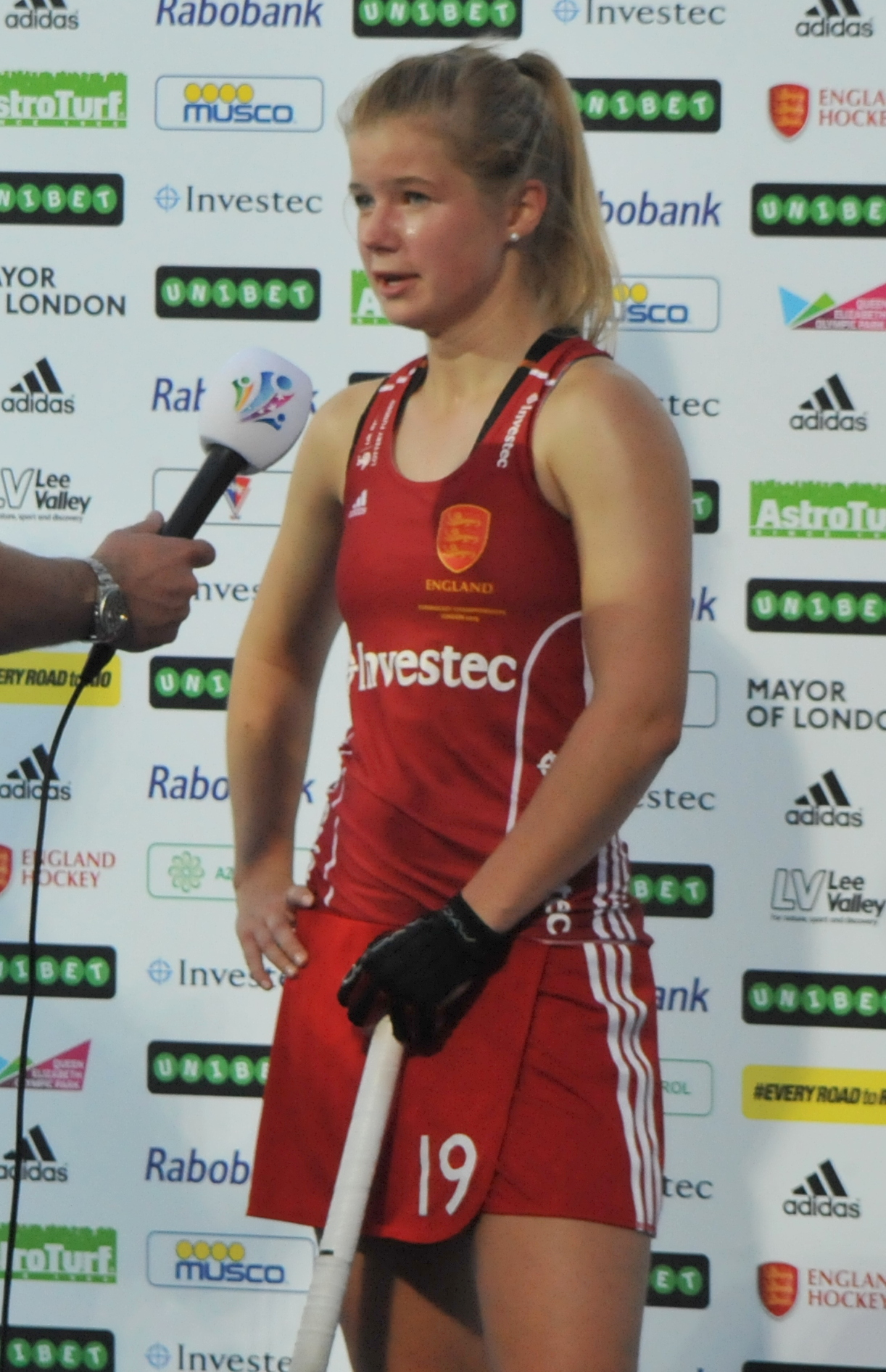

Personal information
- Born: 12 May 1990 (age 36) Grasse, France
- Height: 1.63 m (5 ft 4 in)
- Weight: 61 kg (134 lb)

Sport
- Sport: Field hockey
- Position: Forward
- Club: East Grinstead
National team
Years	Team	Caps	Goals
2013–2019	England	86	(28)
2014–2019	Great Britain	48	(16)
Medal record
Representing Great Britain
Olympic Games
Gold medal – first place	2016 Rio de Janeiro	Team
Representing England
European Championship
Gold medal – first place	2015 London
Bronze medal – third place	2017 Amstelveen
Commonwealth Games
Silver medal – second place	2014 Glasgow	Team
Bronze medal – third place	2018 Brisbane	Team

Sophie Charlotte Bray (born 12 May 1990) is an English international field hockey player who played as a forward for England and Great Britain.

She currently plays club hockey in the Investec Women's Hockey League Premier Division for East Grinstead.

== Personal life ==
Bray lives in Claygate, Surrey but was born in France where her father worked as a marketing consultant. Back in England she played tennis and football at local clubs, representing Surrey at tennis aged 11. She gave up playing tennis and played football for Fulham Ladies, because she preferred a team sport. She was educated at Tiffin Girls' School, Kingston upon Thames joining Surbiton Hockey Club during her time at the school, initially playing for the colts aged 16, before progressing to the senior team.

She attended the University of Birmingham where she studied psychology.

== Career ==
Bray competed for England in the women's hockey tournament at the 2014 Commonwealth Games where she won a silver medal, and was a member of the Investec sponsored winning team at the EuroHockey Championships in 2015.

In 2016, she competed for Team GB in the women's Olympic field hockey tournament at the 2016 Summer Olympics in Rio de Janeiro, where Team GB won gold in the final against the Netherlands after a penalty shoot out.

Bray was appointed Member of the Order of the British Empire (MBE) in the 2017 New Year Honours for services to hockey.

Bray has also played for Surbiton, Uni of Birmingham and in the Netherlands for MOP Hockey Club, Vught, near Eindhoven and most recently Kampong.

On 4 February 2019, Bray announced her retirement from international hockey. During her international career she scored 44 goals and made 134 appearances for England and Great Britain.

== Honours and achievements ==
=== International ===
==== Great Britain ====
- Gold medal in field hockey at the 2016 Summer Olympics

==== England ====
- Gold medal in 2015 Women's EuroHockey Nations Championship
- Silver medal in Hockey at the 2014 Commonwealth Games
- Bronze medal in Hockey at the 2018 Commonwealth Games
- Bronze medal in 2017 Women's EuroHockey Nations Championship

=== Individual ===
- Investec Women's Hockey League Player of the Season 2018–2019
