= Georgie Twigg =

British field hockey player

Georgie Twigg MBE
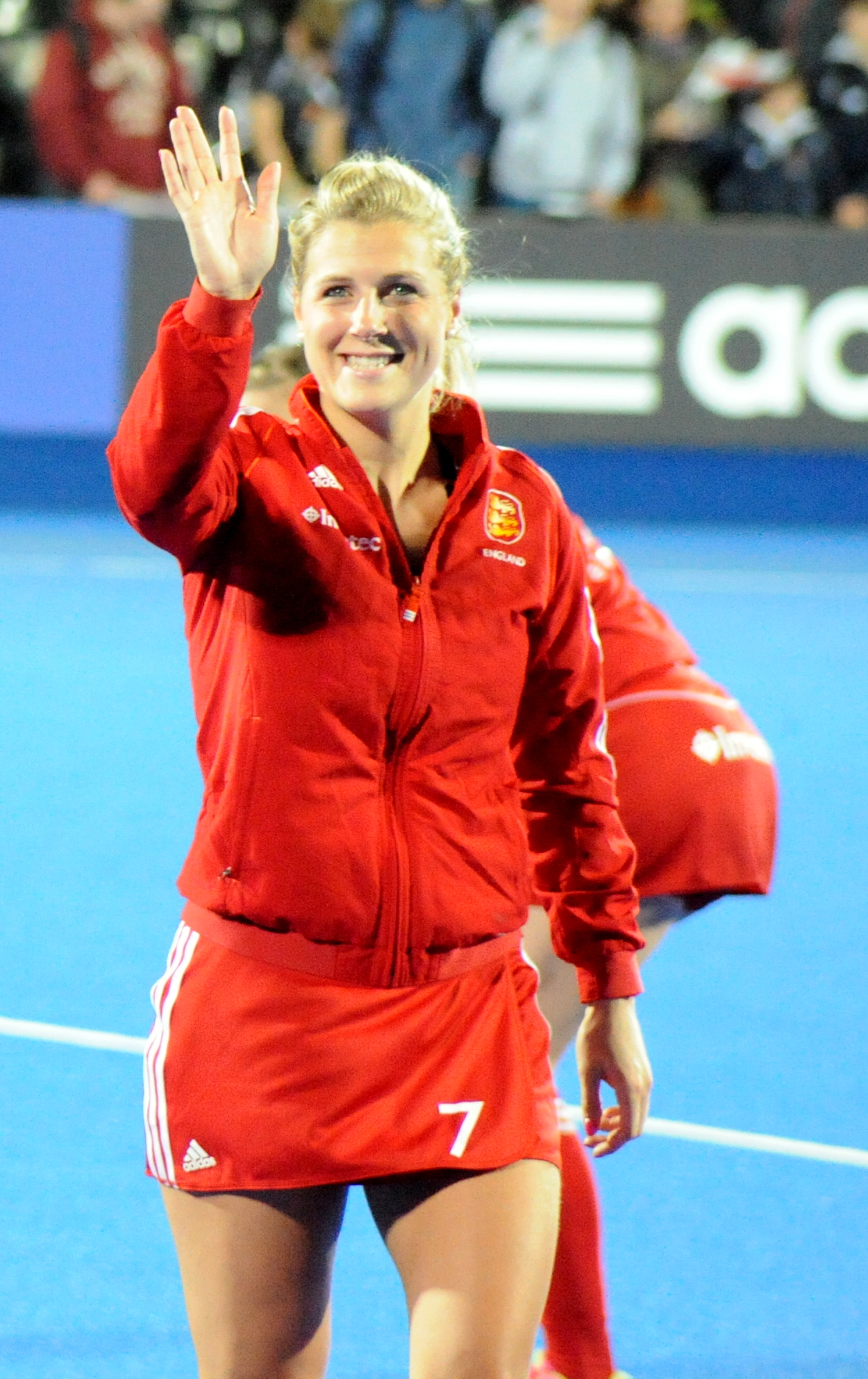
- Twigg in 2015

Personal information
- Full name: Georgina Sophie Twigg
- Born: 21 November 1990 (age 35) Lincoln, Lincolnshire
- Height: 1.70 m (5 ft 7 in)
- Weight: 60 kg (132 lb)

Sport
- Sport: Field hockey
- Position: Midfielder
- Club: Surbiton
National team
Years	Team	Caps	Goals
2010–2016	England & GB	249	(12)
Medal record
Women's field hockey
Representing Great Britain
Olympic Games
Gold medal – first place	2016 Rio de Janeiro	Team
Bronze medal – third place	2012 London	Team
Champions Trophy
Silver medal – second place	2012 Rosario
Representing England
Commonwealth Games
Silver medal – second place	2014 Glasgow	Team
Bronze medal – third place	2010 Delhi	Team
World Cup
Bronze medal – third place	2010 Rosario
Champions Trophy
Bronze medal – third place	2010 Nottingham
European Championship
Gold medal – first place	2015 London
Silver medal – second place	2013 Boom
Bronze medal – third place	2011 Monchengladbach

Georgina Sophie Twigg (born 21 November 1990) is an English international field hockey player and an Olympic gold medalist at the 2016 Summer Olympics.

== Hockey career ==
She plays club hockey in the Women's England Hockey League Premier Division for Surbiton. Twigg played as a midfielder for England and Great Britain from 2010 to 2016.

In that time, results have included:

- Gold at the Rio 2016 Summer Olympics,
- Gold at the 2015 European Championship
- Silver at the 2014 Glasgow Commonwealth Games,
- Silver medal with Great Britain at the 2012 Champions Trophy in Argentina,
- Bronze with England at the 2010 Commonwealth Games in Delhi, scoring the winning goal in the Bronze medal match,
- Bronze medal with England at the 2010 Argentina World Cup,
- Bronze medal at the London 2012 Summer Olympics.

She was named England Hockey's Young Performance Player of the Year in 2010, 2011, 2012 & 2013. She made her international debut at the 2010 Champions Trophy and was the youngest player in Great Britain's 2012 Olympic squad. She has played for Surbiton, Clifton Robinsons, University of Bristol, Cannock and Lincoln. She announced her official retirement from international hockey in July 2018.

== Personal life ==
Twigg is from Lincoln, and attended Repton School.

Since 2012 Twigg has been in a relationship with Iain Lewers, the England/Great Britain men's international. In 2019 they became engaged and got married in 2021.

She arrived at Bristol University at the age of 17 in September 2008 to read law. While an undergraduate she played hockey for university and Clifton. Because of her link to Bristol, she was one of the Olympic torchbearers when the torch was carried through Bristol. Following the 2012 Summer Olympics, her home village post box was painted bronze; it was repainted the official red colour by the Royal Mail.

== Retirement ==
In 2016, she indefinitely suspended her international hockey career, citing her professional career as a trainee city lawyer. She announced her official retirement in July 2018.
