= Caia van Maasakker =

Dutch field hockey player (born 1989)

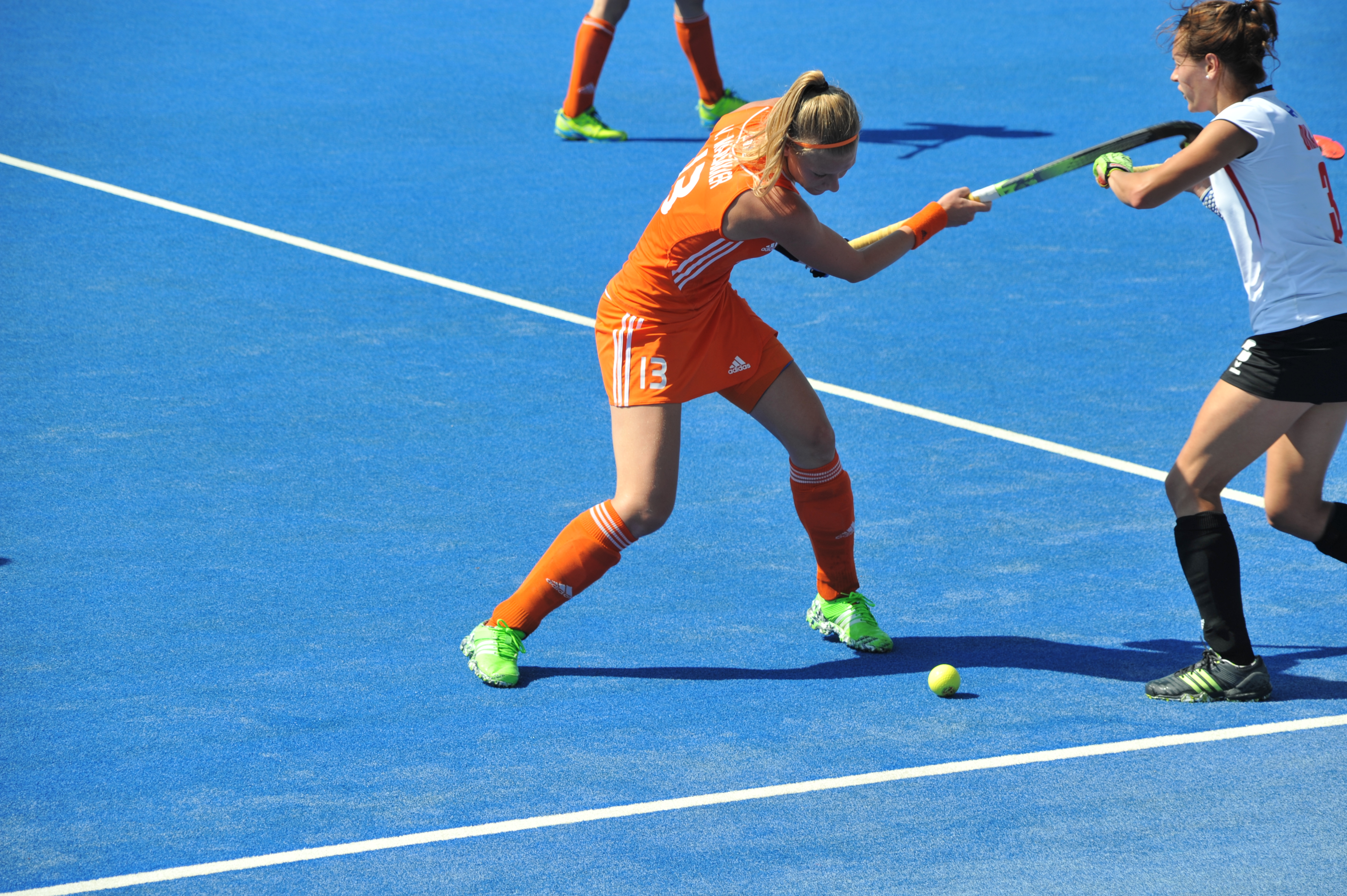
- Caia van Maasakker (left) in 2015

Personal information
- Born: 5 April 1989 (age 37) The Hague, Netherlands
- Height: 1.80 m (5 ft 11 in)
- Weight: 69 kg (152 lb)

Sport
- Sport: Field hockey
- Position: Defender
- Club: SCHC
National team
Years	Team	Caps	Goals
2011–	Netherlands	160	(46)
Medal record
Women's field hockey
Representing Netherlands
Olympic Games
Gold medal – first place	2012 London	Team
Gold medal – first place	2020 Tokyo	Team
Silver medal – second place	2016 Rio de Janeiro	Team
World Cup
Gold medal – first place	2014 The Hague
Gold medal – first place	2018 London
European Championship
Gold medal – first place	2017 Amstelveen
Gold medal – first place	2019 Antwerp
Gold medal – first place	2021 Amstelveen
Silver medal – second place	2015 London
Bronze medal – third place	2013 Boom
Champions Trophy
Gold medal – first place	2011 Amsterdam
Gold medal – first place	2018 Changzhou
Bronze medal – third place	2014 Mendoza

Caia van Maasakker (born 5 April 1989) is a Dutch field hockey player who plays as a defender.

At the 2012 Summer Olympics, she competed for the Netherlands women's national field hockey team in the women's event, winning a gold medal. She was part of the Netherlands' silver medal-winning side at the 2016 Olympics.
