= 2015 Women's EuroHockey Championship =

International field hockey competition

2015 Women's EuroHockey Nations Championship
Tournament details
- Host country: England
- City: London
- Dates: 22–30 August
- Teams: 8
- Venue: Lee Valley Hockey and Tennis Centre

Final positions
- Champions: England (2nd title)
- Runner-up: Netherlands
- Third place: Germany

Tournament statistics
- Matches played: 20
- Goals scored: 85 (4.25 per match)
- Top scorer: (Netherlands) Caia van Maasakker (5 goals)
- Best player: (England) Alex Danson

The 2015 Women's EuroHockey Nations Championship was the 12th edition of the women's field hockey championship organised by the European Hockey Federation. It was held from 22 to 30 August 2015 in the Queen Elizabeth Olympic Park, London, England.

England defeated Netherlands on penalty shuttles in the final, drawing initially 2-2, with goals from Lily Owsley and Sophie Bray. Defender Sam Quek was named Man of the Match in the final.

== Qualified teams ==
- Belgium
- England
- Germany
- Italy
- Netherlands
- Poland
- Scotland
- Spain

== Format ==
The eight teams were split into two groups of four teams. The top two teams advanced to the semifinals to determine the winner in a knockout system. The bottom two teams played in a new group against the teams they did not play in the group stage. The last two teams were relegated to the EuroHockey Nations Challenge.

== Results ==
=== Preliminary round ===
==== Pool A ====
| Pos | Team | Pld | W | D | L | GF | GA | GD | Pts | Qualification |
|---|---|---|---|---|---|---|---|---|---|---|
| 1 | Netherlands | 3 | 3 | 0 | 0 | 22 | 1 | +21 | 9 | Advanced to semifinals |
| 2 | Spain | 3 | 1 | 1 | 1 | 11 | 8 | +3 | 4 | Advanced to semifinals |
| 3 | Belgium | 3 | 1 | 1 | 1 | 4 | 6 | −2 | 4 | |
| 4 | Poland | 3 | 0 | 0 | 3 | 1 | 23 | −22 | 0 | |

Source: FIH.ch
Rules for classification: 1) points; 2) goal difference; 3) goals scored; 4) head-to-head result.

22 August 2015
10:45

| Belgium | 0–0 | Spain |
|---|---|---|
| | Report |

Umpires:
Frances Block (ENG)
Sarah Wilson (SCO)

22 August 2015
13:00

| Netherlands | 9–0 | Poland |
|---|---|---|
| Jonker 13', 33'; De Goede 13'; Dirkse van den Heuvel 20'; Hoog 25', 30', 53'; Paumen 40'; Keetels 54' | Report |

Umpires:
Valentina Tomasi (ITA)
Amy Baxter (USA)

23 August 2015
10:45

| Poland | 1–4 | Belgium |
|---|---|---|
| Okaj 59' | Report | Versavel 13'; Gerniers 17'; Sinia 20'; Vandermeiren 31' |

Umpires:
Claire Adenot (FRA)
Pilar López (ESP)

23 August 2015
13:00

| Spain | 1–8 | Netherlands |
|---|---|---|
| Bonastre 57' | Report | Dirkse van den Heuvel 10'; Jonker 22', 34'; Keetels 24'; De Goede 28'; Van As 31'; Van Maasakker 38', 50' |

Umpires:
Michelle Meister (GER)
Cathy Jones (WAL)

26 August 2015
11:00

| Spain | 10–0 | Poland |
|---|---|---|
| Riera 2', 34', 41'; Magaz 20', 22'; Salvatella 24', 38'; Ybarra 31', 37'; Petchame 35' | Report |

Umpires:
Valentina Tomasi (ITA)
Michelle Meister (GER)

26 August 2015
17:15

| Netherlands | 5–0 | Belgium |
|---|---|---|
| Magis 8'; Van Maasakker 18'; Paumen 42', 58'; Hoog 44' | Report |

Umpires:
Pilar López (ESP)
Frances Block (ENG)

==== Pool B ====
| Pos | Team | Pld | W | D | L | GF | GA | GD | Pts | Qualification |
|---|---|---|---|---|---|---|---|---|---|---|
| 1 | England | 3 | 3 | 0 | 0 | 8 | 2 | +6 | 9 | Advanced to semifinals |
| 2 | Germany | 3 | 2 | 0 | 1 | 7 | 5 | +2 | 6 | Advanced to semifinals |
| 3 | Scotland | 3 | 1 | 0 | 2 | 5 | 5 | 0 | 3 | |
| 4 | Italy | 3 | 0 | 0 | 3 | 1 | 9 | −8 | 0 | |

Source: FIH.ch
Rules for classification: 1) points; 2) goal difference; 3) goals scored; 4) head-to-head result.

22 August 2015
18:15

| England | 2–1 | Scotland |
|---|---|---|
| K. Richardson-Walsh 10'; H. Richardson-Walsh 20' | Report | Marshall 3' |

Umpires:
Fanneke Alkemade (NED)
Michelle Meister (GER)

22 August 2015
20:30

| Germany | 4–0 | Italy |
|---|---|---|
| Altenburg 2'; Krüger 22'; Haase 46'; Mävers 59' | Report |

Umpires:
Cathy Jones (WAL)
Laurine Delforge (BEL)

24 August 2015
17:15

| Scotland | 1–2 | Germany |
|---|---|---|
| Kidd 55' | Report | Hauke 18'; Mävers 42' |

Umpires:
Valentina Tomasi (ITA)
Frances Block (ENG)

24 August 2015
19:30

| Italy | 0–2 | England |
|---|---|---|
| | Report | H. Richardson-Walsh 45'; White 60' |

Umpires:
Pilar López (ESP)
Sarah Wilson (SCO)

26 August 2015
13:15

| Scotland | 3–1 | Italy |
|---|---|---|
| Fawcett 31'; Merchant 36'; Marshall 39' | Report | Tiddi 37' |

Umpires:
Fanneke Alkemade (NED)
Laurine Delforge (BEL)

26 August 2015
19:30

| England | 4–1 | Germany |
|---|---|---|
| Bray 2'; Danson 3', 44', 53' | Report | Hillmann 39' |

Umpires:
Claire Adenot (FRA)
Amy Baxter (USA)

=== Fifth to eighth place classification ===
==== Pool C ====
| Pos | Team | Pld | W | D | L | GF | GA | GD | Pts | Relegation |
|---|---|---|---|---|---|---|---|---|---|---|
| 1 | Belgium | 3 | 3 | 0 | 0 | 9 | 4 | +5 | 9 | |
| 2 | Scotland | 3 | 2 | 0 | 1 | 5 | 2 | +3 | 6 | |
| 3 | Italy | 3 | 0 | 1 | 2 | 5 | 8 | −3 | 1 | Relegated to EuroHockey Nations Challenge |
| 4 | Poland | 3 | 0 | 1 | 2 | 2 | 7 | −5 | 1 | Relegated to EuroHockey Nations Challenge |

Source: FIH.ch
Rules for classification: 1) points; 2) goal difference; 3) goals scored; 4) head-to-head result.

28 August 2015
11:00

| Poland | 1–1 | Italy |
|---|---|---|
| Rybacha 9' | Report | Pacella 60' |

Umpires:
Sarah Wilson (SCO)
Fanneke Alkemade (NED)

28 August 2015
17:15

| Belgium | 1–0 | Scotland |
|---|---|---|
| Versavel 1' | Report |

Umpires:
Amy Baxter (USA)
Cathy Jones (WAL)

30 August 2015
09:00

| Belgium | 4–3 | Italy |
|---|---|---|
| Van Lindt 4'; Simons 31'; Vandermeiren 33'; Puvrez 47' | Report | Lovagnini 7'; Tiddi 13'; Ruggieri 43' |

Umpires:
Claire Adenot (FRA)
Pilar López (ESP)

30 August 2015
11:15

| Scotland | 2–0 | Poland |
|---|---|---|
| Kidd 14'; Bunce 36' | Report |

Umpires:
Frances Block (ENG)
Cathy Jones (WAL)

=== First to fourth place classification ===
Semi-finals
28 August
Netherlands | 1
Germany | 0
28 August
Spain | 1
England | 2

Final
30 August
Netherlands | 2 (1)
England (pen.) | 2 (3)
Third place
30 August
Germany | 5
Spain | 1

==== Semifinals ====
28 August 2015
13:15

| Netherlands | 1–0 | Germany |
|---|---|---|
| Zerbo 6' | Report |

Umpires:
Frances Block (ENG)
Laurine Delforge (BEL)

28 August 2015
19:30

| England | 2–1 | Spain |
|---|---|---|
| Danson 4'; Owsley 52' | Report | Oliva 44' |

Umpires:
Claire Adenot (FRA)
Michelle Meister (GER)

==== Third and fourth place ====
30 August 2015
13:30

| Germany | 5–1 | Spain |
|---|---|---|
| Stapenhorst 12', 19', 32'; Altenburg 22'; Hoffmann 29' | Report | Petchame 44' |

Umpires:
Laurine Delforge (BEL)
Fanneke Alkemade (NED)

==== Final ====
30 August 2015
16:00

| England | 2–2 | Netherlands |
|---|---|---|
| Bray 52'; Owsley 54' | Report | Van Maasakker 40', 43' |
Penalties
| H. Richardson-Walsh (penalty shoot-out missed) , (penalty shoot-out scored) Danson (penalty shoot-out scored); Bray (penalty shoot-out scored); Twigg (penalty shoot-out missed) | 3–1 | (penalty shoot-out missed) Bos; (penalty shoot-out missed) Welten; (penalty shoot-out scored) Hoog; (penalty shoot-out missed) De Goede |

Umpires:
Sarah Wilson (SCO)
Amy Baxter (USA)

Notes

1. Netherlands goalkeeper Joyce Sombroek fouled England's Helen Richardson-Walsh during the shoot-out. Penalty stroke was awarded and H. Richardson-Walsh scored.

== Statistics ==
=== Final standings ===
As per statistical convention in field hockey, matches decided in extra time are counted as wins and losses, while matches decided by penalty shoot-outs are counted as draws.

| Pos | Team | Pld | W | D | L | GF | GA | GD | Pts | Status |
|---|---|---|---|---|---|---|---|---|---|---|
| 1st place, gold medalist(s) | England | 5 | 4 | 1 | 0 | 12 | 5 | +7 | 13 | Qualified for 2016 Summer Olympics |
| 2nd place, silver medalist(s) | Netherlands | 5 | 4 | 1 | 0 | 25 | 3 | +22 | 13 | |
| 3rd place, bronze medalist(s) | Germany | 5 | 3 | 0 | 2 | 12 | 7 | +5 | 9 | |
| 4 | Spain | 5 | 1 | 1 | 3 | 13 | 15 | −2 | 4 | |
| 5 | Belgium | 5 | 3 | 1 | 1 | 9 | 9 | 0 | 10 | |
| 6 | Scotland | 5 | 2 | 0 | 3 | 7 | 6 | +1 | 6 | |
| 7 | Italy | 5 | 0 | 1 | 4 | 5 | 14 | −9 | 1 | Relegated to EuroHockey Championship II |
| 8 | Poland | 5 | 0 | 1 | 4 | 2 | 26 | −24 | 1 | Relegated to EuroHockey Championship II |

Source: FIH

=== Awards ===
| Player of the Tournament | Top Goalscorer | Goalkeeper of the Tournament |
|---|---|---|
| (England) Alex Danson | (Netherlands) Caia van Maasakker | (Germany) Yvonne Frank |

=== Goalscorers ===
There were 85 goals scored in 20 matches, for an average of 4.25 goals per match.

5 goals

- (Netherlands) Caia van Maasakker

4 goals

- (England) Alex Danson
- (Netherlands) Ellen Hoog
- (Netherlands) Kelly Jonker

3 goals

- (Germany) Charlotte Stapenhorst
- (Netherlands) Maartje Paumen
- (Spain) Lola Riera

2 goals

- (Belgium) Judith Vandermeiren
- (Belgium) Louise Versavel
- (England) Sophie Bray
- (England) Lily Owsley
- (England) Helen Richardson-Walsh
- (Germany) Lisa Altenburg
- (Germany) Marie Mävers
- (Italy) Chiara Tiddi
- (Netherlands) Eva de Goede
- (Netherlands) Carlien Dirkse van den Heuvel
- (Netherlands) Marloes Keetels
- (Scotland) Nikki Kidd
- (Scotland) Kareena Marshall
- (Spain) Alicia Magaz
- (Spain) Carlota Petchamé
- (Spain) Carola Salvatella
- (Spain) Rocío Ybarra

1 goal

- (Belgium) Alix Gerniers
- (Belgium) Emma Puvrez
- (Belgium) Manon Simons
- (Belgium) Emilie Sinia
- (Belgium) Lieselotte Van Lindt
- (England) Kate Richardson-Walsh
- (England) Nicola White
- (Germany) Lydia Haase
- (Germany) Franzisca Hauke
- (Germany) Kristina Hillmann
- (Germany) Eileen Hoffmann
- (Germany) Hannah Krüger
- (Italy) Aldara Lovagnini
- (Italy) Elisabetta Pacella
- (Italy) Giuliana Ruggieri
- (Netherlands) Valerie Magis
- (Netherlands) Naomi van As
- (Netherlands) Ginella Zerbo
- (Poland) Paulina Okaj
- (Poland) Marlena Rybacha
- (Scotland) Vikki Bunce
- (Scotland) Leigh Fawcett
- (Scotland) Rebecca Merchant
- (Spain) Berta Bonastre
- (Spain) Georgina Oliva

Source: FIH
