= Ellen Hoog =

Dutch field hockey player

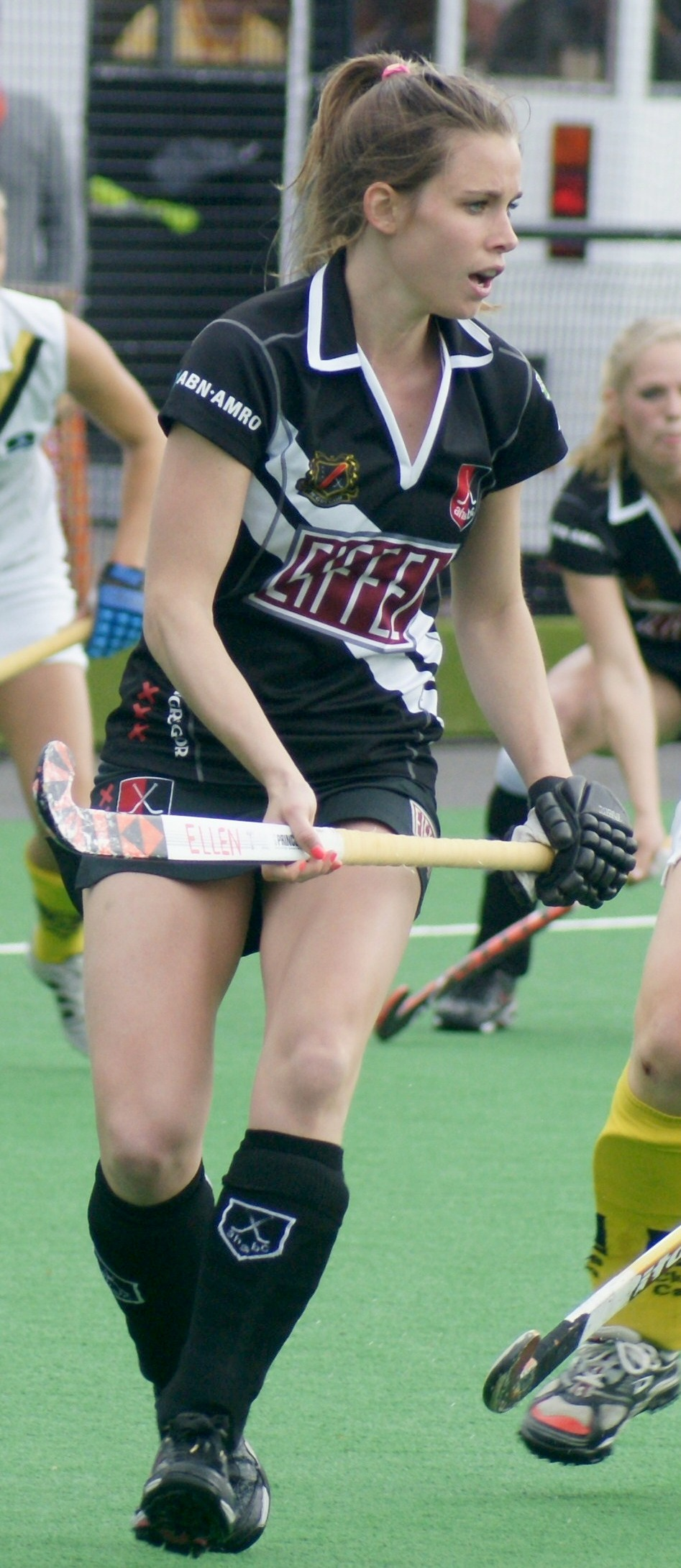
- Hoog in 2009

Personal information
- Full name: Ellen Marijn Hoog
- Born: 26 March 1986 (age 40) Bloemendaal, Netherlands
- Height: 1.64 m (5 ft 5 in)
- Weight: 54 kg (119 lb)

Sport
- Sport: Field hockey
- Position: Midfield
Senior career
Years	Team	Caps	Goals
2002–2007	SCHC	-	-
2007–2017	AH&BC	-	-
National team
Years	Team	Caps	Goals
2004–2016	Netherlands	232	(60)
Medal record
Women's field hockey
Representing the Netherlands
Olympic Games
Gold medal – first place	2008 Beijing	Team
Gold medal – first place	2012 London	Team
Silver medal – second place	2016 Rio de Janeiro	Team
World Cup
Gold medal – first place	2006 Madrid
Gold medal – first place	2014 The Hague
Silver medal – second place	2010 Rosario
European Championship
Gold medal – first place	2005 Dublin
Gold medal – first place	2009 Amstelveen
Gold medal – first place	2011 Gladbach
Silver medal – second place	2007 Manchester
Silver medal – second place	2015 London
Bronze medal – third place	2013 Boom
Champions Trophy
Gold medal – first place	2004 Rosario
Gold medal – first place	2005 Canberra
Silver medal – second place	2010 Nottingham
Bronze medal – third place	2006 Amstelveen
Bronze medal – third place	2009 Sydney
Bronze medal – third place	2014 Mendoza

Ellen Marijn Hoog (Dutch pronunciation: [ˈɛlə(n) ˈɦoːx]; born 26 March 1986) is a former Dutch field hockey player, who is regarded as one of the best Dutch hockey players of her generation.

== Field hockey career ==
Ellen began playing field hockey at the age of seven and in 2002, aged 16, she was selected to play her first senior game for Stichtse Cricket en Hockey Club in Bilthoven and made her debut for the Netherlands women's national field hockey team at age 17 in 2004 and has played in 232 matches, scoring 60 goals. She won Olympic gold medals in 2008 and 2012 and an Olympic silver medal in 2016.

In August 2005, she became the European champion in Dublin. In December of the same year she won the Champions Trophy in Canberra with the Dutch national women's team. She was a part of the Dutch squads which won the 2006 Women's Hockey World Cup and the 2014 Women's Hockey World Cup. She was also named as the best player of the 2014 Women's Hockey World Cup.

In 2012, Hoog became the first woman player to decide a major championship match with a penalty shootout, taking the winning shot in the 2012 Summer Olympics semi-final against New Zealand. She repeated this feat in 2016 when she took the winning shot in the 2016 Summer Olympics semi against Germany.

She retired from international duty in 2016. She later retired from hockey at her club Amsterdamsche Hockey & Bandy Club in May 2017.

== Style of play ==
Ellen Hoog is a specialist when it comes to reverse shooting. She is precise and strong with her forehand shot, and uses this skill to execute the penalty corners. Her offensive speed and ability to change directions quickly, made her one of the most dangerous midfielders in the world.

== Personal life ==
In August 2015, her book In perfecte conditie (In perfect condition) was published.

Ellen Hoog married her long-term boyfriend in June 2017, after ending her career as a professional. She gave birth to her daughter in February 2019.

== Honours ==
Netherlands women's national field hockey team

- Olympic Gold Medal: 2008, 2012
- Women's Hockey World Cup: 2006, 2014
- Hockey Champions Trophy: 2004, 2005
- Women's EuroHockey Championship: 2005, 2009, 2011
- Women's FIH Hockey World League: 2012–13

AH&BC

- Women's Hoofdklasse Hockey: 2008–09, 2012–13

=== Individual ===
- Best player of the tournament: 2014 Women's Hockey World Cup
- FIH Player of the Year: 2014
