= Carlien Dirkse van den Heuvel =

Dutch field hockey player

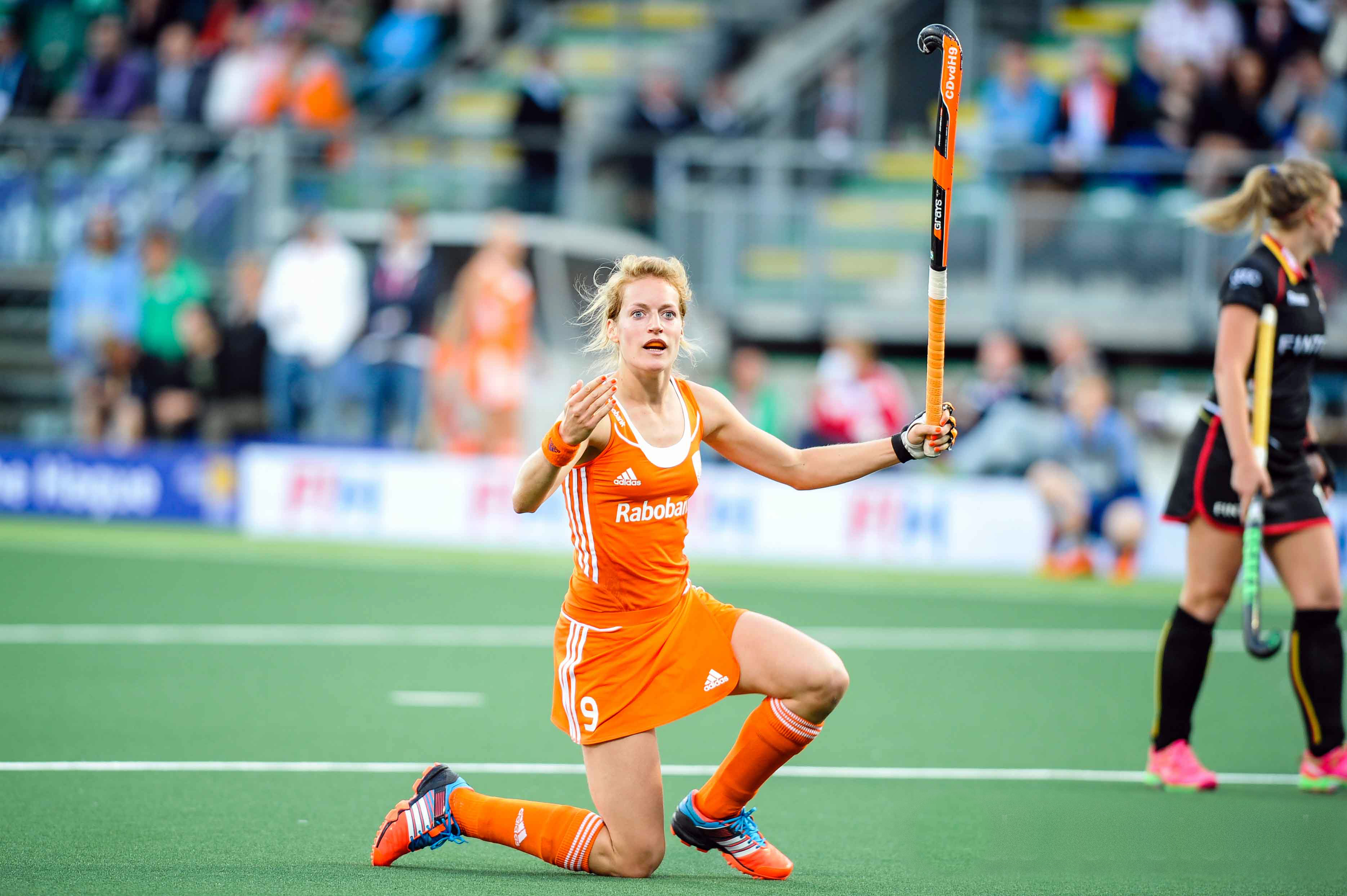

Personal information
- Born: 16 April 1987 (age 39) 's-Hertogenbosch, Netherlands
- Height: 1.70 m (5 ft 7 in)
- Weight: 56 kg (123 lb)

Sport
- Sport: Field hockey
- Position: Midfielder
- Club: SCHC
National team
Years	Team	Caps	Goals
2008–	Netherlands	203	(28)
Medal record
Women's field hockey
Representing Netherlands
Olympic Games
Gold medal – first place	2012 London	Team
Silver medal – second place	2016 Rio de Janeiro	Team
World Cup
Gold medal – first place	2014 The Hague
Gold medal – first place	2018 London
Silver medal – second place	2010 Rosario
European Championship
Gold medal – first place	2009 Amstelveen
Gold medal – first place	2011 Gladbach
Gold medal – first place	2017 Amstelveen
Silver medal – second place	2015 London
Bronze medal – third place	2013 Boom
Champions Trophy
Gold medal – first place	2011 Amsterdam
Silver medal – second place	2010 Nottingham
Silver medal – second place	2016 London
Bronze medal – third place	2008 Mönchengladbach
Bronze medal – third place	2009 Sydney
Bronze medal – third place	2012 Rosario
Bronze medal – third place	2014 Mendoza

Carlien Dirkse van den Heuvel (born 16 April 1987) is a Dutch field hockey player.

At the 2012 Summer Olympics, she competed for the Netherlands women's national field hockey team in the women's event, winning the gold medal. Fox News notes her as one of ten LGBT Olympians to medal in London.

== Private life ==
Carlien is lesbian.
