= Marloes Keetels =

Dutch field hockey player

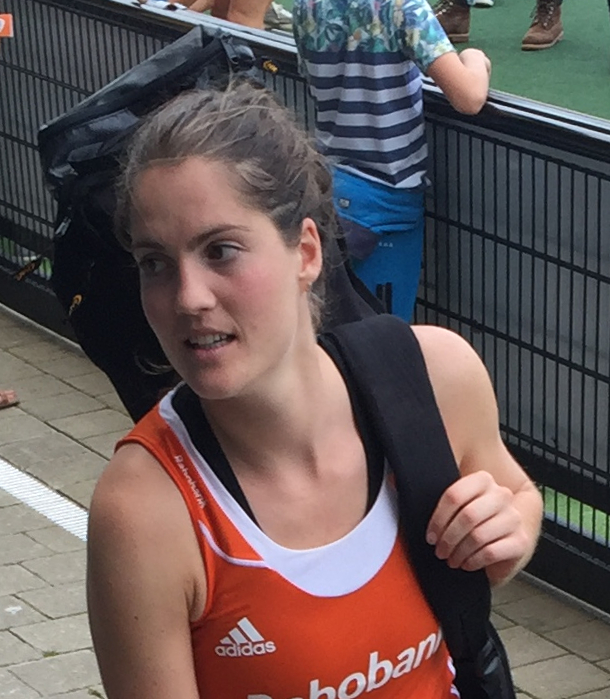
- Keetels in 2016

Personal information
- Full name: Marloes Johanna Maria Keetels
- Born: 4 May 1993 (age 33) Schijndel, Netherlands
- Height: 1.74 m (5 ft 9 in)
- Weight: 66 kg (146 lb)

Sport
- Sport: Field hockey
- Position: Midfielder
- Club: HC 's-Hertogenbosch
National team
Years	Team	Caps	Goals
2013–	Netherlands	128	(13)
Medal record
Olympic Games
Gold medal – first place	2020 Tokyo	Team
Silver medal – second place	2016 Rio de Janeiro	Team
World Cup
Gold medal – first place	2014 The Hague
Gold medal – first place	2018 London
Gold medal – first place	2022 Terrassa/Amstelveen
European Championship
Gold medal – first place	2017 Amstelveen
Gold medal – first place	2019 Antwerp
Gold medal – first place	2021 Amstelveen
Silver medal – second place	2015 London
Champions Trophy
Silver medal – second place	2016 London
Bronze medal – third place	2014 Mendoza

Marloes Keetels (born 4 May 1993) is a Dutch field hockey player.

Keetels has played for the Netherlands women's national field hockey team since 2013. She was a member of the Netherlands team that won the 2014 Women's Hockey World Cup.

== See also ==
- List of Youth Olympic Games gold medalists who won Olympic gold medals
