= Rebecca Condie =

Scottish field hockey player

Bex Condie
Personal information
- Nationality: Scottish
- Born: 3 May 1990 (age 35) Hannover, Germany
- Height: 1.65 m (5 ft 5 in)

Sport
- Country: Scotland
- Sport: Field hockey
- Position: Defender

Rebecca "Bex" Condie (born 3 May 1990) is a Scottish field hockey player who plays as a defender for Scotland.

== Biography ==
Condies was born in Hannover, Germany. She plays club hockey in the Investec Women's Hockey League Premier Division for Uni of Birmingham.

She is also a biology teacher in Dean Close Senior school.
