= Becky Mill =

Scottish field hockey player

Sport
- Sport: Field hockey
National team
Years	Team	Caps	Goals
2007-2018	Scotland	139	-

Becky Mill or Becky Merchant also previously known as Rebecca Merchant is a former Scottish female field hockey player who played for the Scotland women's national field hockey team. She represented Scotland for 12 years in a career spanning from 2007 to 2018. In January 2020, she announced her retirement from international arena.

== Career ==
She grew and raised up in Surrey and moved to Edinburgh to pursue her higher studies in university. She started playing the sport of field hockey from the age of 7. She is an alumna of Kingston Grammar School.

She made her international debut in 2007 against Ireland. She made her maiden Commonwealth Games appearance representing Scotland at the 2010 Commonwealth Games. Becky achieved 100 international caps during the 2015 Women's EuroHockey Nations Championship in a match against Italy. She also made her captaincy debut in 2016 against South Africa. She last represented the national team in a friendly game against Ireland in 2018 and announced her international retirement in 2020.
