= Nicola White =

English field hockey player

Nicola White MBE
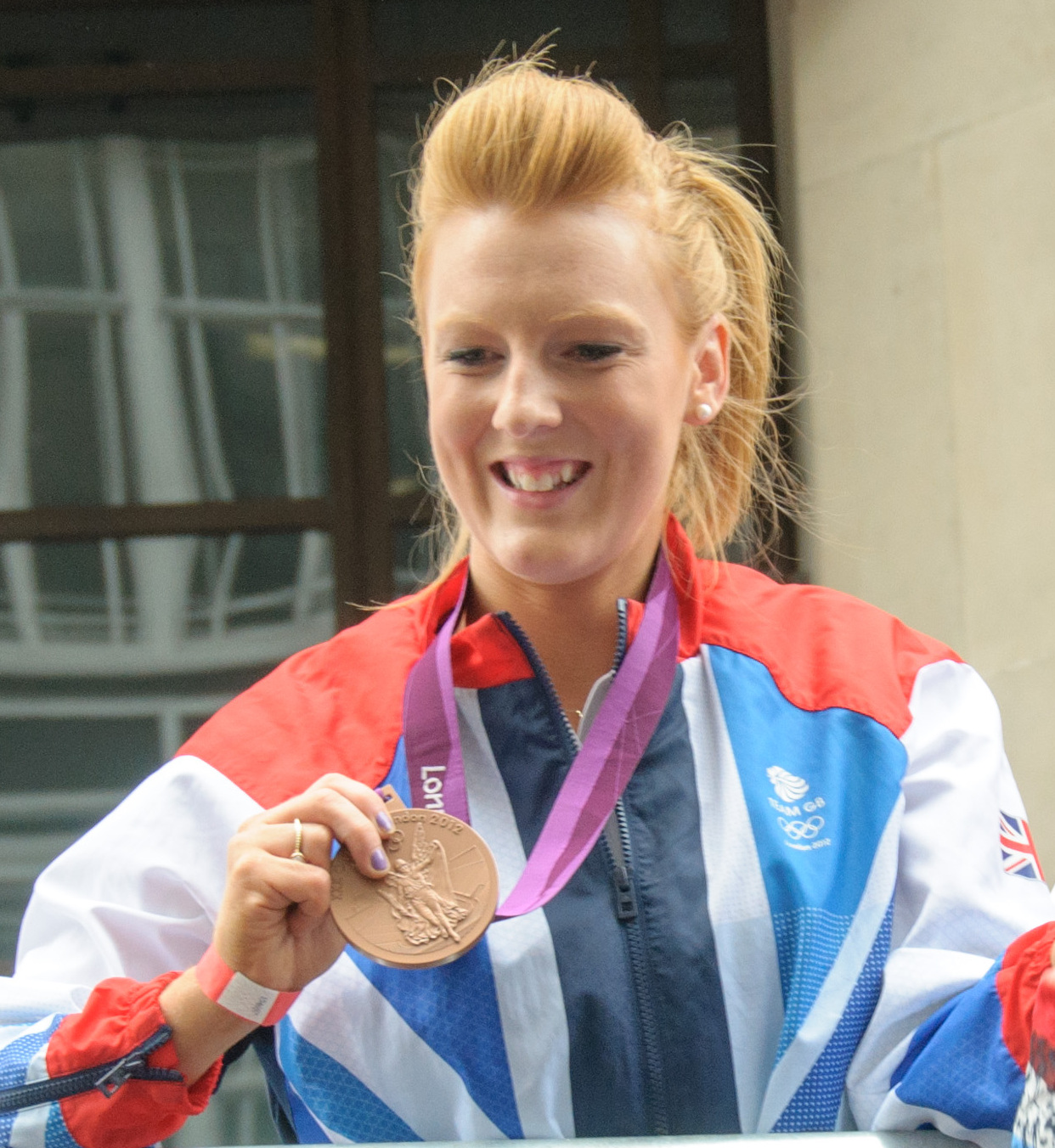
- White at Our Greatest Team Parade in 2012

Personal information
- Born: 20 January 1988 (age 38) Shaw and Crompton, Greater Manchester, England
- Height: 1.72 m (5 ft 8 in)
- Weight: 65 kg (143 lb)

Sport
- Sport: Field hockey
- Position: Forward
Medal record
Representing Great Britain
Olympic Games
Gold medal – first place	2016 Rio de Janeiro	Team
Bronze medal – third place	2012 London	Team
Champions Trophy
Silver medal – second place	2012 Rosario
Representing England
Commonwealth Games
Silver medal – second place	2014 Glasgow	Team
Bronze medal – third place	2010 Delhi	Team
World Cup
Bronze medal – third place	2010 Rosario
Champions Trophy
Bronze medal – third place	2010 Nottingham
European Championship
Gold medal – first place	2015 London
Silver medal – second place	2013 Boom
Bronze medal – third place	2009 Amstelveen
Bronze medal – third place	2011 Monchengladbach

Nicola White (born 20 January 1988) is an English international field hockey player who plays as a forward for England and Great Britain.

She now plays club hockey in the Women's England Hockey League Premier Division for Hampstead & Westminster, joining the club for the 2020-21 season after many successful years playing for Holcombe.

White won a gold medal at the 2016 Olympic Games and a bronze medal at the 2012 Olympic Games.

After making her international debut for England in May 2009, White has won a silver medal at the Champions Trophy and bronze medals at the World Cup, Commonwealth games, and European championships.

She was born in Shaw and Crompton, and began playing hockey at the age of 7 at school and started her club hockey at Saddleworth HC and is now currently playing for Holcombe HC in the Premier Division. In addition to her sporting accolades, she completed her Sports Science Degree at Loughborough College in 2013 and attended Oldham Hulme Grammar School for both primary and secondary education.

In 2018, she received an honorary degree from Loughborough University.
