= Marijke Fleuren =

Hockey executive

- Education: University of Groningen
- Occupation: President of the European Hockey Federation
- Predecessor: Martin Gotheridge
- Honours: Knight of the Order of Orange-Nassau

Marijke Fleuren (née Marijke van Walsem) is the president of the European Hockey Federation (EHF) and International Hockey Federation (FIH) Executive Board member. She became Knight of the Order of Orange-Nassau in 2014.

Before starting her work for the EHF, Fleuren was an active member of the Leidse and Oegstgeester Mixed Hockey Club. She was also member of the board, and vice-president of the Dutch National Field Hockey organisation ('KNHB'). While at the KNHB she spearheaded the campaign 'Samen voor Sportiviteit en Respect' ('Together for Sportsmanship and Respect'), for which the organization won the European Fair Play Plaque of Merit and Diploma in 2009. She was made an honorary member of the KNHB in 2002. She has been the president of the EHF since August 2011, and started a second term as president in 2015.

Fleuren is a strong proponent of gender equality in sport, and is a member of the IOC Women in Sport Commission. In November 2018 she received the FIH President's Award for her role in the advancement of field hockey in Europe and gender equality in the sport.
