= Willemijn Bos =

Dutch field hockey defender

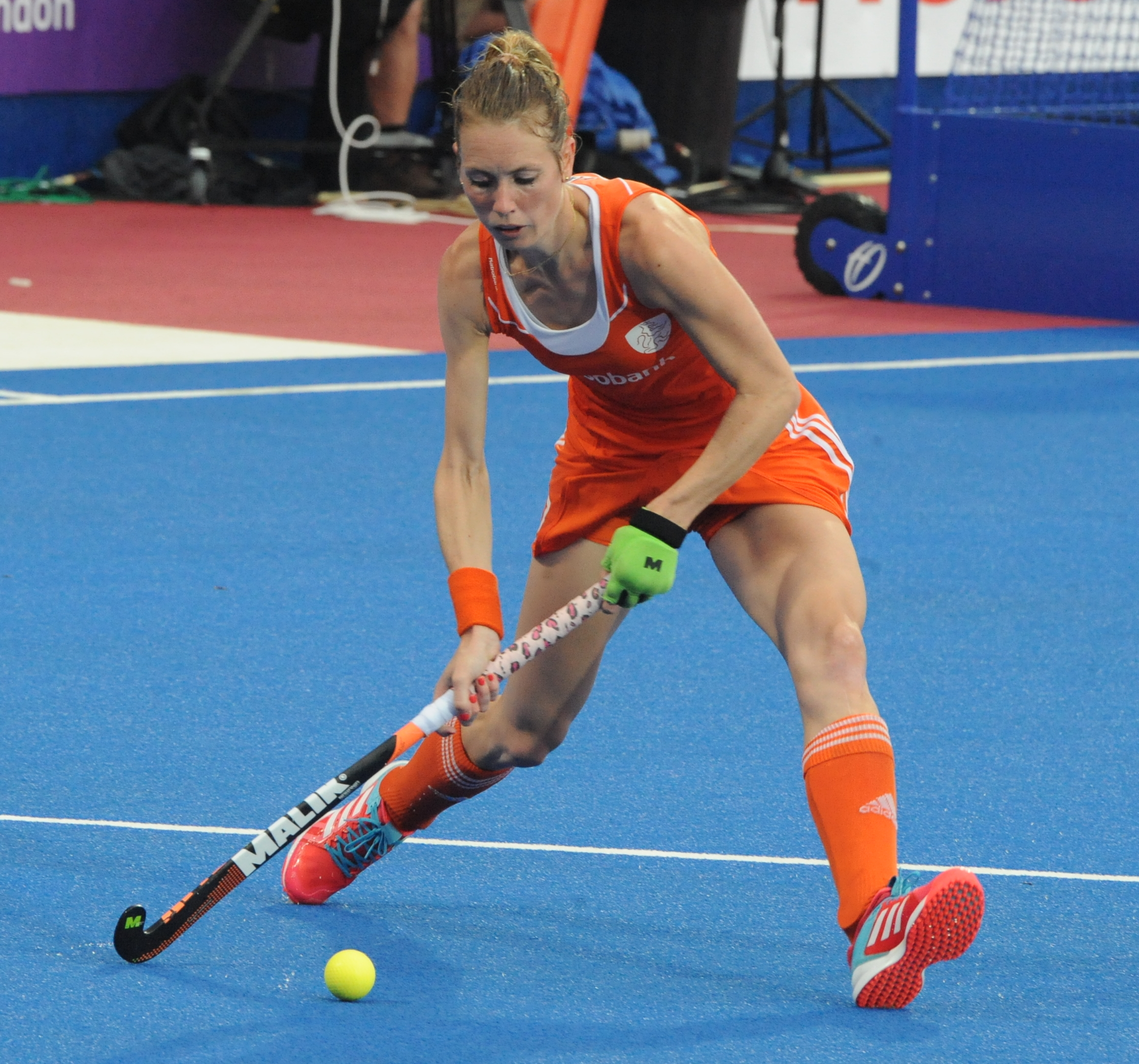
- Bos in 2016

Personal information
- Nationality: Dutch
- Born: Willemijn Bos; 2 May 1988 (age 38) Eelde, Netherlands
- Height: 1.81 m (5 ft 11 in)
- Weight: 69 kg (152 lb)

Sport
- Country: Netherlands
- Sport: Field hockey
- Club: Laren
- Coached by: Ageeth Boomgaardt (club); Alyson Annan (national)
Medal record
Representing the Netherlands
Olympic Games
Silver medal – second place	2016 Rio de Janeiro	Team
World Cup
Gold medal – first place	2014 The Hague
European Championship
Gold medal – first place	2011 Gladbach
Bronze medal – third place	2013 Boom
Silver medal – second place	2015 London
Champions Trophy
Gold medal – first place	2011 Amsterdam
Bronze medal – third place	2012 Rosario
Bronze medal – third place	2014 Mendoza

Willemijn Bos (born 2 May 1988) is a Dutch field hockey defender. In 2011, she was included to the All-Star team by the International Hockey Federation. She was to be selected for the 2012 Summer Olympics but tore her anterior cruciate ligament during a friendly against the United States three days before the Games and had to withdraw. She returned to competitions in March 2013, and won a silver medal at the 2016 Rio Olympics.

Bos took up hockey aged six. She has a degree in law from the University of Utrecht.
