= Kelly Jonker =

Dutch field hockey player (born 1990)

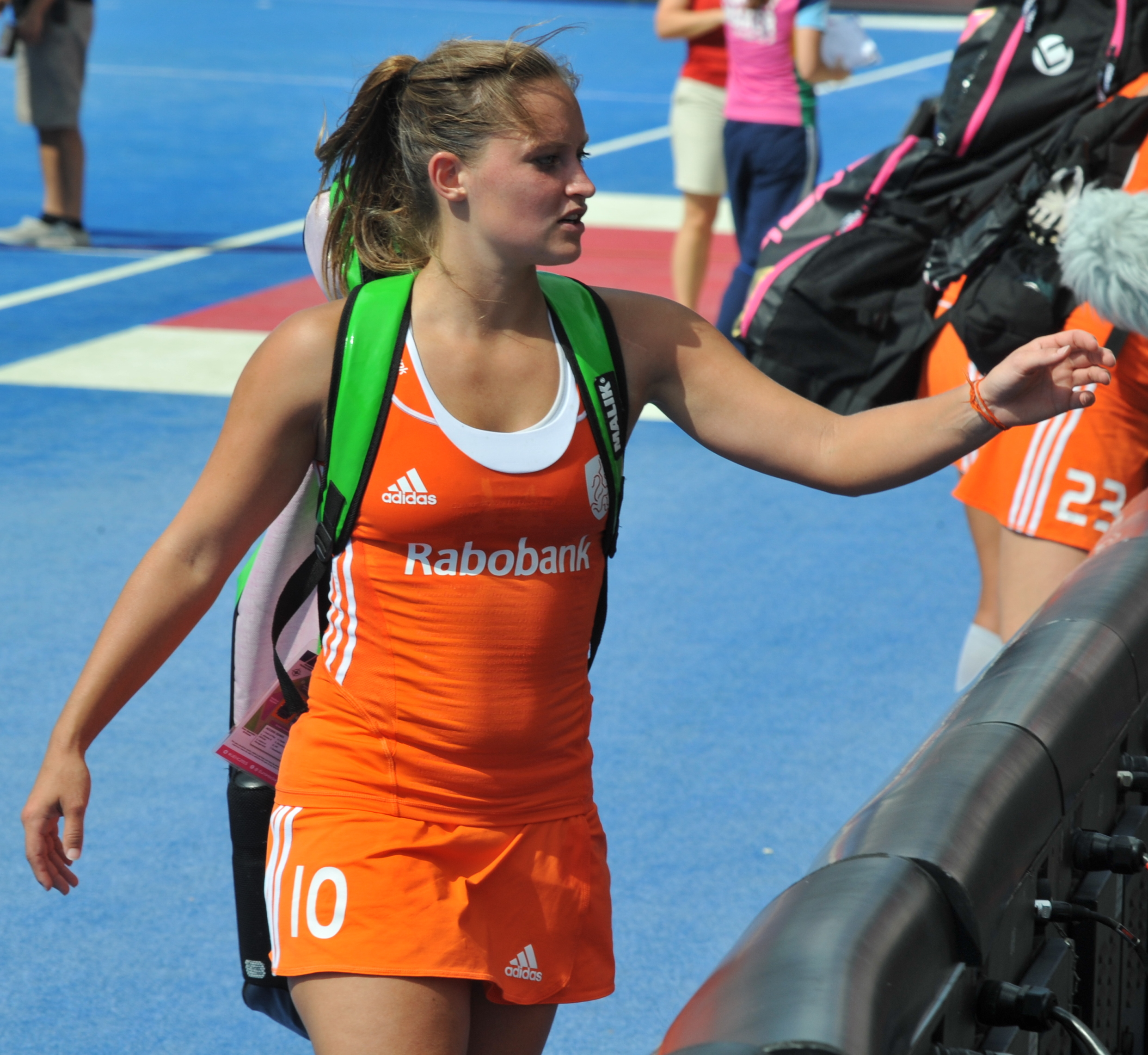
- Jonker in 2015

Personal information
- Full name: Kelly Maria Jonker
- Born: 23 May 1990 (age 36) Amstelveen, Netherlands
- Height: 1.59 m (5 ft 3 in)
- Weight: 59 kg (130 lb)

Sport
- Sport: Field hockey
- Position: Forward Pinoke]
National team
Years	Team	Caps	Goals
2008–2019	Netherlands	153	(62)
Medal record
Women's field hockey
Representing Netherlands
Olympic Games
Gold medal – first place	2012 London	Team
Silver medal – second place	2016 Rio de Janeiro	Team
World Cup
Gold medal – first place	2014 The Hague
Gold medal – first place	2018 London
Silver medal – second place	2010 Rosario
European Championship
Gold medal – first place	2017 Amstelveen
Gold medal – first place	2019 Antwerp
Silver medal – second place	2015 London
Bronze medal – third place	2013 Boom
Champions Trophy
Silver medal – second place	2010 Nottingham
Bronze medal – third place	2012 Rosario

Kelly Maria Jonker (born 23 May 1990 in Amstelveen) is a Dutch field hockey player.

At the 2012 Summer Olympics, she competed for the Netherlands women's national field hockey team in the winning the gold medal. She also competed for the team four years later in Rio, where the Netherlands won the silver medal.
