= Alex Danson =

British field hockey player

Alex Danson MBE
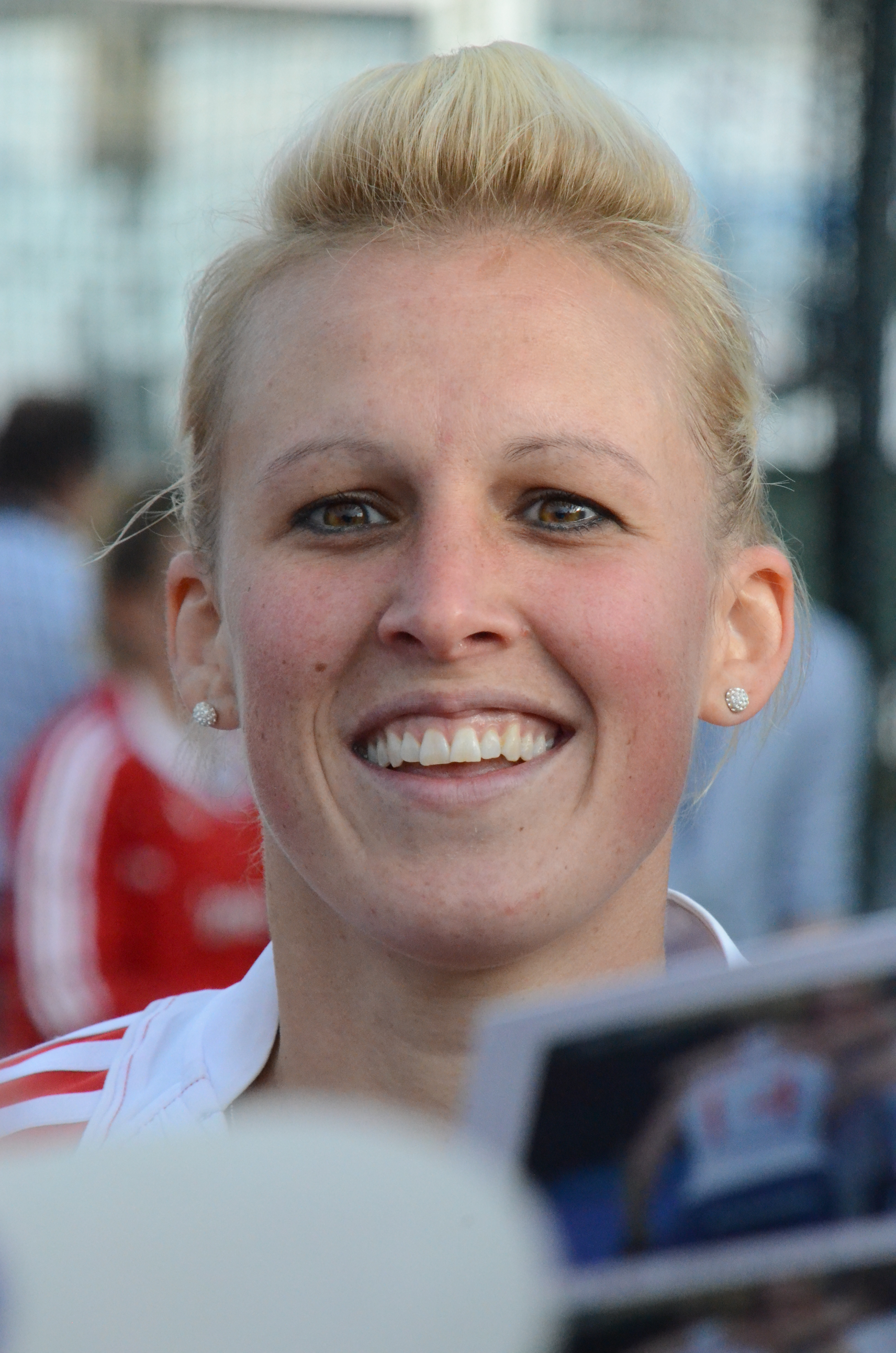
- Danson in 2013

Personal information
- Full name: Alexandra Mary Louise Danson-Bennett
- Born: 21 May 1985 (age 41) Southampton, Hampshire, England
- Height: 1.65 m (5 ft 5 in)
- Weight: 56 kg (123 lb)

Sport
- Sport: Field hockey
- Position: Forward
National team
Years	Team	Caps	Goals
2001–2018	England	203	(62)
2010–2018	Great Britain	103	(53)
Medal record
Women's field hockey
Representing Great Britain
Olympic Games
Gold medal – first place	2016 Rio de Janeiro	Team
Bronze medal – third place	2012 London	Team
Champions Trophy
Silver medal – second place	2012 Rosario
Representing England
World Cup
Bronze medal – third place	2010 Rosario
FIH Champions Trophy
Bronze medal – third place	2010 Nottingham
European Championship
Gold medal – first place	2015 London
Silver medal – second place	2013 Boom
Bronze medal – third place	2005 Dublin
Bronze medal – third place	2007 Manchester
Bronze medal – third place	2009 Amstelveen
Bronze medal – third place	2011 Monchengladbach
Bronze medal – third place	2017 Amstelveen
Commonwealth Games
Silver medal – second place	2014 Glasgow	Team
Bronze medal – third place	2006 Melbourne	Team
Bronze medal – third place	2010 Delhi	Team
Bronze medal – third place	2018 Gold Coast	Team
Champions Challenge I
Gold medal – first place	2002 Johannesburg
Bronze medal – third place	2007 Baku

Alexandra Mary Louise "Alex" Danson (born 21 May 1985) is a retired English international hockey player who played as a forward for England and Great Britain. She played club hockey for Clifton Robinsons, Reading, Klein Zwitserland, Trojans and Alton.

Danson attended two independent schools, Yateley Manor Prep School and Farnborough Hill School, a Roman Catholic school for girls. Farnborough Hill School named their all-weather hockey pitch in her honour. She made her full international debut on 23 October 2001 against Germany. She won a gold medal at the 2016 Olympic Games and a bronze medal at the 2012 Olympic Games.

Danson was appointed Member of the Order of the British Empire (MBE) in the 2017 New Year Honours for services to hockey. Later that year Danson was announced as the England Women's Hockey Captain in June 2017 and led the team through to the last four in the semi-finals of the world league. Also in 2017, Danson launched the Alex Danson Hockey Academy, aimed at introducing young children to the sport through their schools to increase awareness and participation in hockey at a grassroots level.

She played her last international match on 2 August 2018, against the Netherlands. It was her 306th appearance for England and Great Britain. Danson announced her retirement from playing hockey on 20 February 2020.

== Honours and awards ==
=== Honours ===
Representing Great Britain

Olympic Games

- 2016 Rio de Janeiro: Gold
- 2012 London: Bronze

FIH Champions Trophy

- 2012 Rosario: Silver

Representing England

EuroHockey Nations Championship

- 2015 London: Gold
- 2013 Boom: Silver
- 2011 Monchengladbach: Bronze
- 2009 Amstelveen: Bronze
- 2007 Manchester: Bronze
- 2005 Dublin: Bronze

Commonwealth Games

- 2014 Glasgow: Silver
- 2010 Delhi: Bronze
- 2006 Melbourne: Bronze

World Cup

- 2010 Rosario: Bronze

FIH Champions Trophy

- 2010 Nottingham: Bronze

FIH Champions Challenge I

- 2007 Baku: Bronze
- 2002 Johannesburg: Gold

Country

- London Cup Winner: 2012
- London Cup Third-place: 2011

Reading Hockey Club

- EuroHockey Club Champions Trophy Winners: 2013
- EuroHockey Indoor Club Trophy Runners-up: 2014
- Women's England Hockey League Winners: 2010–11, 2012–13; Runners-up: 2011–12
- English Indoor Championship Winners: 2012–13, 2013–14; Runners-up: 2010–11, 2011–12
- English League (regular season) Winners: 2011–12
- English Indoor League (regular season) Third-place: 2013–14

=== Awards and nominations ===
- 2001 BBC Sports Personality of the Year Young Personality (runner-up)
- 2011 FIH World All Star Team
- 2011 Reading Sports Personality of Year
- 2011 UK Female Player of the Year (Hockey Writers' Club)
- 2011–12 Premier League Player of the Season
- 2011–12 Premier League Top Scorer
- 2011–12 Premier League All Star Team
- 2012 UK Female Player of the Year (Hockey Writers' Club) (runner-up)
- 2012 London Cup Player of the Tournament
- 2014–15 FIH Hockey World League Semi-finals Player of the Tournament
- 2015 EuroHockey Nations Championship Player of the Tournament
- 2015 Committee Award (Sports Journalists' Association)
- 2015 Sportswoman of the Year (Sports Journalists' Association) (4th place)
- 2015 UK Female Player of the Year (Hockey Writers' Club) (third-place)
- 2015 FIH Women's Player of the Year (International Hockey Federation) (nominated)
