= Annika Sprink =

German field hockey player

Personal information
- Full name: Annika Marie Sprink
- Nationality: German
- Born: 20 October 1995 (age 30)
- Height: 1.73 m (5 ft 8 in)
- Weight: 61 kg (134 lb)

Sport
- Country: Germany
- Sport: Field hockey
Medal record
Olympic Games
Bronze medal – third place	2016 Rio de Janeiro	Team

Annika Marie Sprink (born 20 October 1995) is a German field hockey player. She represented her country at the 2016 Summer Olympics.
