= Olympic Hockey Centre (Rio de Janeiro) =

Sports venue in Rio de Janeiro, Brazil

Coordinates: 22.8607°S 43.4024°W

Olympic Hockey Center (tentative)
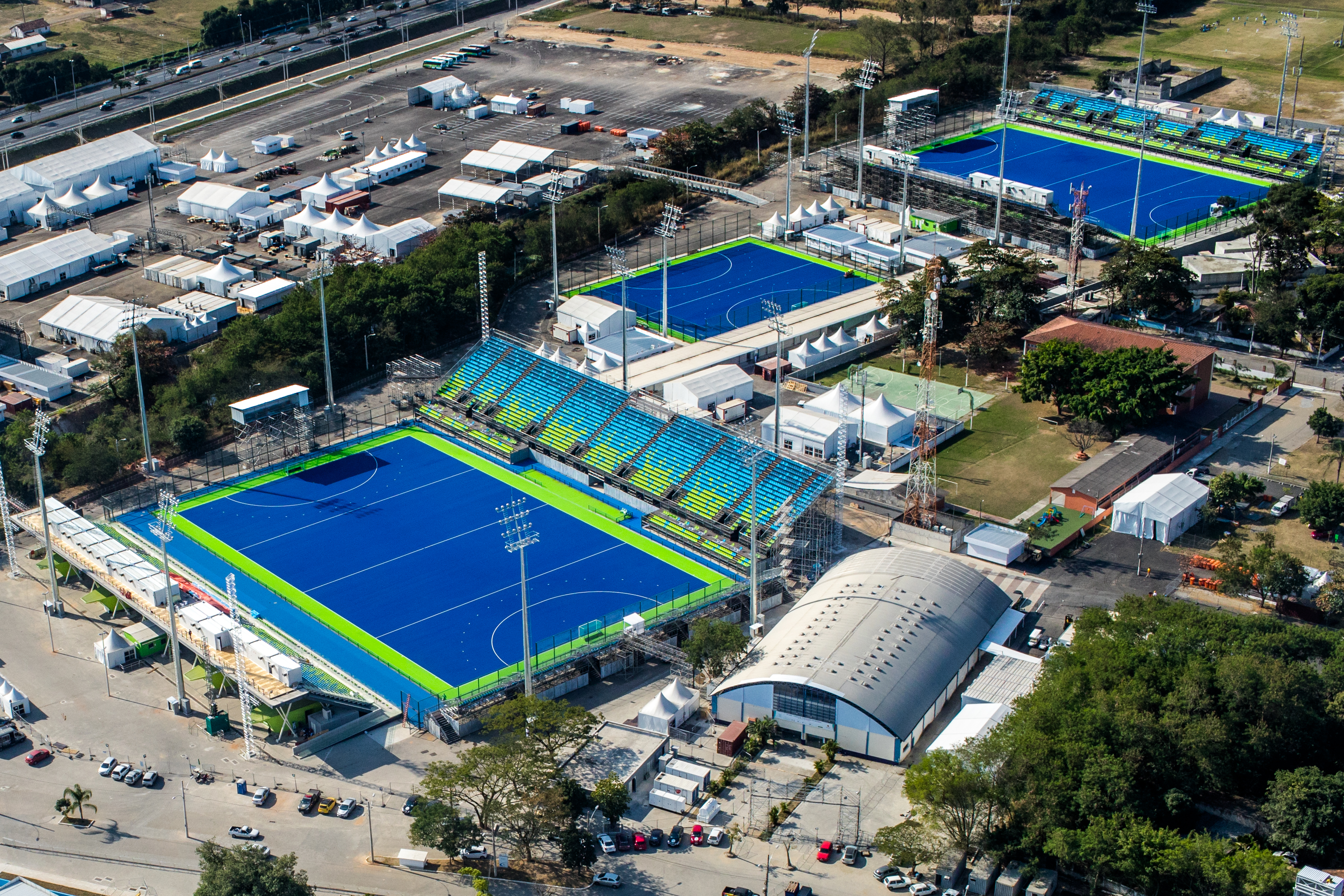
- Interactive map of Olympic Hockey Center (tentative)
- Full name: Olympic Hockey Center
- Location: Rio de Janeiro, Brazil
- Capacity: 10,000 (Main Court); 5,000 (Secondary Court)

Construction
- Opened: 2007
- Renovated: 2016

Tenant
- 2016 Summer Olympics (field hockey)

Website
- Rio2016

The Olympic Hockey Center is a sports venue in Deodoro, Rio de Janeiro, Brazil. The centre was built for the 2007 Pan American Games before being totally rebuilt for the Olympic Field hockey competitions at the 2016 Summer Olympics. The Center was designed by the Brazilian studio Vigliecca & Associados, led by Arch. Ronald Werner Fiedler, Héctor Vigliecca and Luciene Quel.
