= Sam Quek =

British field hockey player, and television presenter

Sam Quek MBE
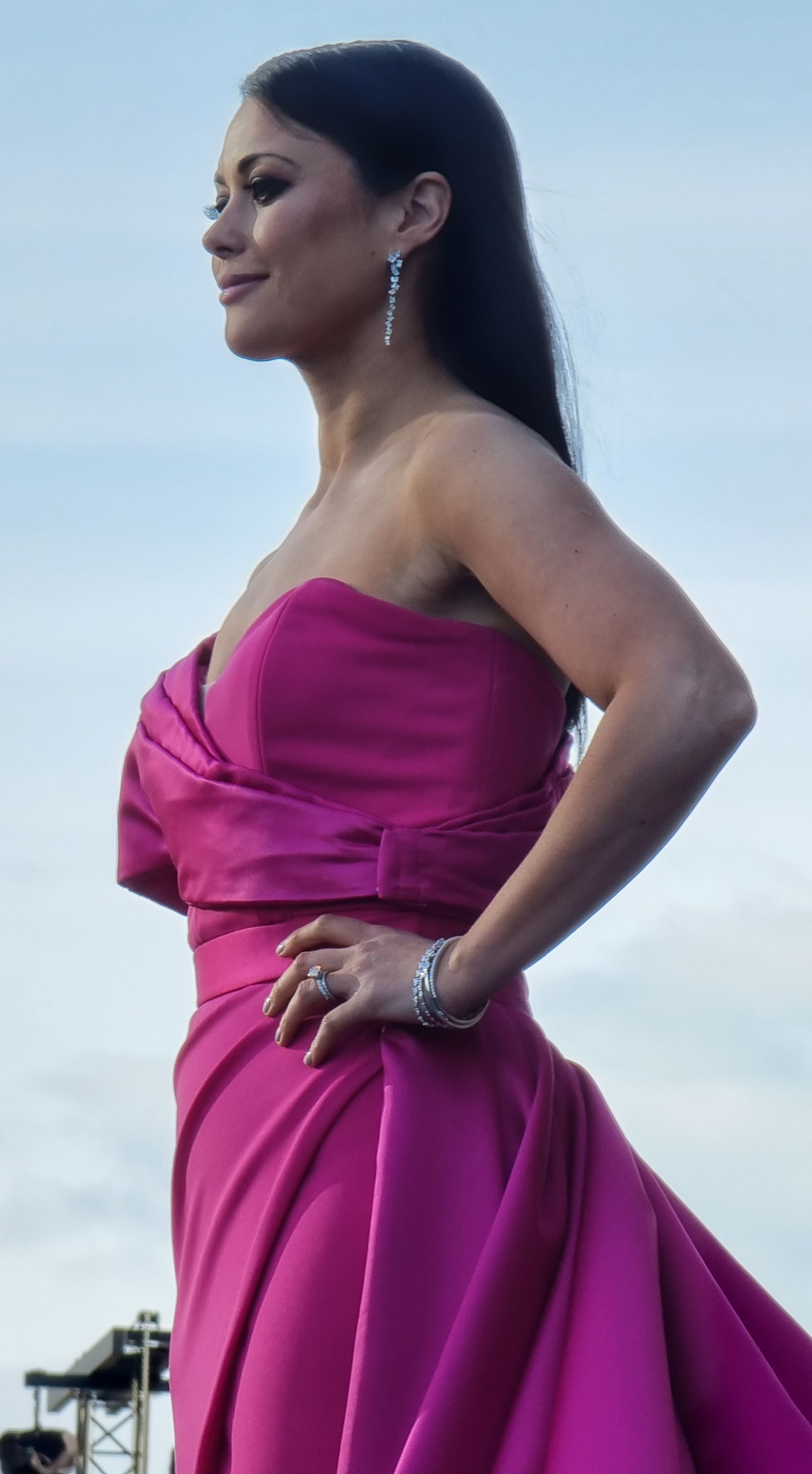
- Quek in 2023

Personal information
- Born: Samantha Ann Quek; 18 October 1988 (age 38) Liverpool, England
- Height: 1.62 m (5 ft 4 in)
- Weight: 62 kg (9 st 11 lb)

Sport
- Country: England; United Kingdom
- Sport: Field hockey
Medal record
Representing Great Britain
Olympic Games
| Gold medal – first place | 2016 Rio de Janeiro | Team |
Representing England
European Championship
| Gold medal – first place | 2015 London |
| Silver medal – second place | 2013 Boom |
Commonwealth Games
| Silver medal – second place | 2014 Glasgow | Team |

Samantha Ann Quek (born 18 October 1988) is an English former field hockey player and television presenter. She played as a defender for both the England and Great Britain teams, wearing squad number 13, and won gold as part of the British team at the 2016 Summer Olympics.

Quek has presented various television sports shows, including American football on the BBC, rugby union on Channel 5, field hockey on BT Sport, and football for Channel 4 and LFC TV. She has appeared as a contestant on shows including I'm a Celebrity...Get Me Out of Here! in 2016 and Celebrity Masterchef in 2020, where she reached the final three.

In 2021, Quek became a team captain on the BBC One sports panel show, Question of Sport and appeared as a contestant on the twenty-second series of Strictly Come Dancing in 2024.

== Early life ==
Quek was born on 18 October 1988 at Mill Road Hospital, Liverpool, to an English mother, Marilyn Quek (née Higgins), and Singaporean Chinese father, Albert Quek. She has a twin brother. The family moved from Coniston Street in Liverpool to the suburb of West Derby when she was about a month old, and to the Wirral Peninsula when she was five. She attended Hillside Primary School on the Wirral for a year before moving to Birkenhead High School and going on to sixth form at Calday Grange Grammar School in West Kirby. She then studied at Leeds Metropolitan University, where she earned a BSc (Hons) in Sport & Exercise Science.

Quek started playing hockey while at Birkenhead High School, and attended trials for the Wirral under-12 team. She was selected to play for Wirral County at the Merseyside Youth Games, and the team won the tournament. She was selected again the following year, when the team was victorious once more. She then joined a team called Mini Panthers, where she was coached by the team organiser Peter Cartmel, who had earlier selected her for the Wirral County team.

== Career ==
=== Hockey career ===
Quek played as a defender and went on to represent both the England and Great Britain teams, wearing squad number 13. In 2005, Quek was part of the England team that won the Girl's (Under-18s) Four Nations Invitational Tournament by defeating Holland on penalties after a 1–1 draw in the final. She won gold as part of the Great Britain Team for the 2007 Australian Youth Olympic Festival. She was also part of the team that were runners-up to Germany at the 2006 Women's EuroHockey Junior Championship. She won her first Great Britain international cap, aged 19 and whilst still at university, featuring in a goalless draw against Argentina 2007. She made her England debut the following year.

She was not selected for the Great Britain squad for the London 2012 Olympic Games, but did play for England at the 2013 Women's EuroHockey Nations Championship, at the 2014 Women's Hockey World Cup (where the England team finished eleventh of twelve, their worst-ever placing), and at the 2014 Commonwealth Games where the team won silver.

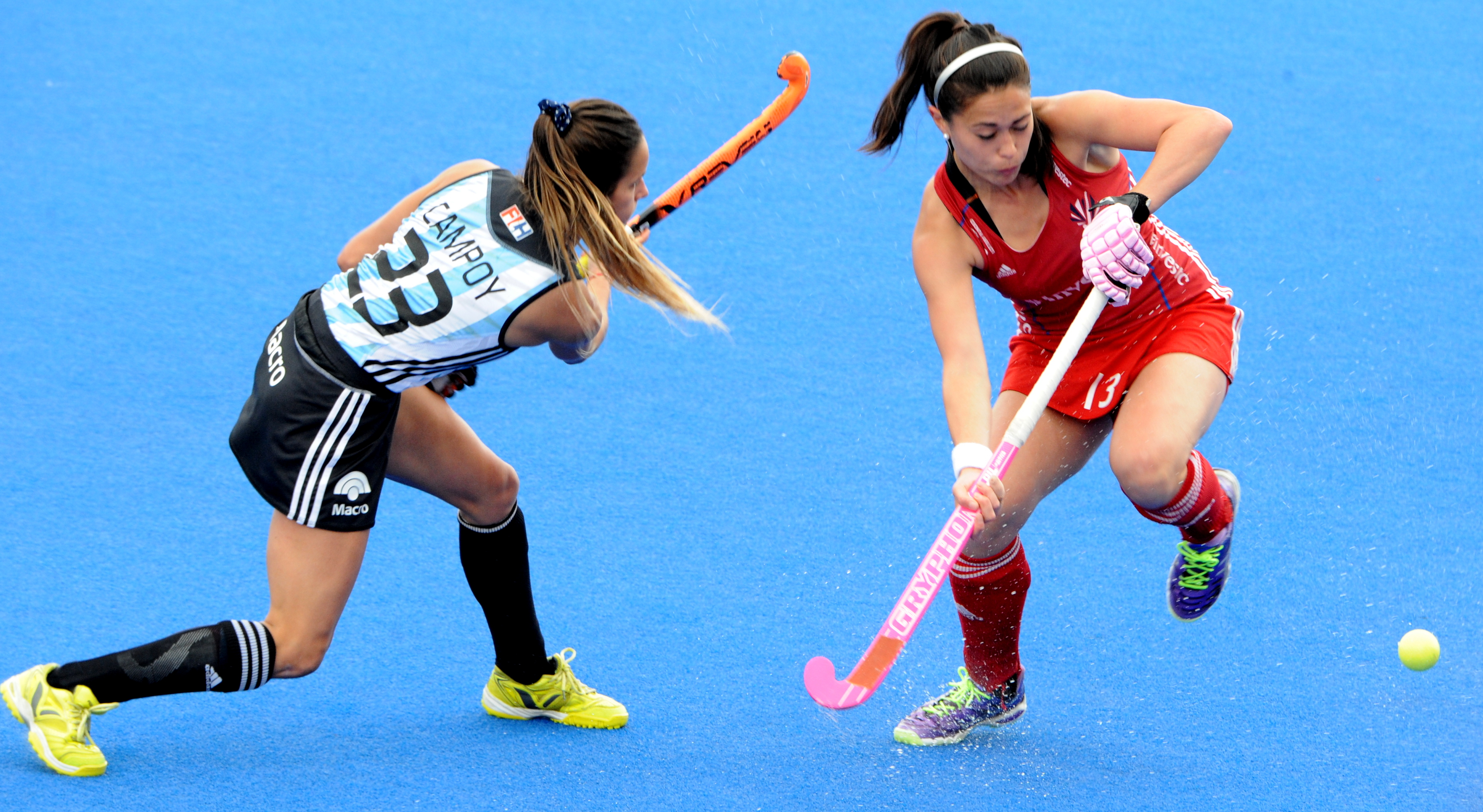
Quek (on the right) playing against Argentina in 2016

In the absence of Kate Richardson-Walsh, Quek captained the England team during the 2014 Champions Trophy in Mendoza, Argentina. She played in every game of the tournament despite, unknown to Quek at the time, breaking two ribs on her right side in their opening game. Quek was also part of the England hockey team who won gold at the European Championships in August 2015 in London. She won Player of the Match in the final against the Netherlands, who were reigning world and Olympic champions at the time.

In August 2016, Quek competed in the Rio Olympic Games. In the group stage, the team won all five of their matches, defeating Australia 2–1, India 3–0, Argentina 3–2, Japan 2–0 and the United States 2–1. A 3–1 quarter-final win over Spain and a 3–0 defeat of New Zealand saw Great Britain reach the final. The team defeated the Netherlands on penalties after a 3–3 draw, winning the first women's hockey gold medal in the Olympics for Great Britain. Quek won her 50th cap for Great Britain during the competition, taking her to more than 125 combined for both England and Great Britain.

In September 2016, a group of Russian hackers calling themselves "Fancy Bears" hacked into the WADA database and revealed that Quek, along with many of her fellow Team GB members, had been granted a Therapeutic Use Exemption (TUE) for various medical prescriptions. Her TUE specifically related to the use of an inhaler in 2008, when she was a teenager. She responded to the leak, stating that not only had she operated within all sporting guidelines, but that she was primarily concerned that the nature of these hacks could stigmatise the future use of TUEs to the detriment of future athletes, describing TUEs as "potentially life-saving practices". The hacks have since been widely discredited by numerous industry professionals and worldwide media outlets.

=== Potential football career ===
Quek was signed to Tranmere Rovers F.C. as a junior. She revealed in an interview with The Guardian that she had to make the choice at the age of 16 between pursuing a professional career in hockey or football, as splitting her time between the two sports was hindering her progress in both. She elected to pursue a career in hockey. On 23 March 2018, Quek was selected to play in an All-Stars team versus FA People's Cup challengers in a 12-hour fundraising match for Sport Relief. She was offered a trial with the Liverpool Ladies FA Women's Super League team by their manager Vicky Jepson, but had not taken the offer up as of April 2020.

=== Media appearances and current work ===
In May 2016, Quek appeared with her husband Tom Mairs on BBC One's game show For What It's Worth, where they won the show's jackpot of £2,500. A few months later, in November, she took part in the sixteenth series of I'm a Celebrity...Get Me Out of Here! She made it to the final four before being voted out on the penultimate day and finishing in fourth place. In March 2017, Quek appeared as a guest panellist on the ITV sports panel game show Play to the Whistle and BBC's A Question of Sport. She also took part in a celebrity edition of The Chase, and appeared alongside Greg Rusedski in Series 11 of Pointless Celebrities.

Quek has been a presenter on sports shows, including for The NFL Show, rugby union on Channel 5, field hockey on BT Sport, and football for Channel 4 and LFC TV. In 2017, she became a sports columnist for the Metro newspaper, and in 2018 wrote a piece for the BBC about the challenges that women face in the media's portrayal of female athletes on and off the field. She also became a weekly sport columnist for the Daily Mirror newspaper. In August 2019, she began hosting the BBC's flagship football phone-in programme, 606, with regular pundit Robbie Savage. In 2020, she competed in Celebrity Masterchef, finishing as a losing finalist.

In July 2021, it was confirmed that Quek would become a team captain on the long-running show Question of Sport. Her appointment was part of a change to the programme's line-up that saw Paddy McGuinness take over as host and Quek become the show's first permanent female captain alongside former rugby union player Ugo Monye.

In July and August 2021, Quek was also co-anchor of BBC's Olympic Breakfast morning programme, covering the Tokyo Olympic Games alongside Dan Walker.

In November 2021, just seven days after giving birth to her daughter, Quek recorded an episode of Who Wants to Be a Millionaire? and won £16,000 for WellChild, which made her the most successful contestant of the Celebrity Special edition, which also featured Harry Redknapp and Craig Charles.

In January 2022, Quek started hosting the BBC One show Morning Live with Gethin Jones.

In February 2023, Quek was chosen to co-host the opening ceremony of the Eurovision Song Contest 2023 in Liverpool together with Ukrainian Eurovision commentator and 2017 contest co-presenter Timur Miroshnychenko.

In October 2023, Quek appeared as a contestant on Richard Osman's House of Games.

In June 2024, Quek released a children's nonfiction book, Roar: A celebration of Great Sporting Women, published by Allen & Unwin.

In August 2024, it was announced that Quek would be a contestant on the twenty-second series of Strictly Come Dancing.

== Personal life ==
Quek is married to Tom Mairs, a property entrepreneur who appeared as the titular "Secret Millionaire" on the reality show of the same name in 2010. She is a supporter of Liverpool and counts their former striker Ian Rush as one of her sporting heroes. She is also a fan of the Kansas City Chiefs. She was appointed an MBE in the 2017 New Years Honours List for services to hockey.

Quek published her autobiography, Sam Quek: Hope and a Hockey Stick, in 2018.

In May 2020, Quek was warned by the Advertising Standards Authority for a second time about promoting a business on Twitter without announcing that she was being paid by the company.

In March 2021, Quek became a mother to a daughter, Molly Doris Mairs, after a traumatic caesarean section.

On 11 October 2021, Quek announced she was pregnant with her second child and gave birth in March 2022 to a son, Isaac Gregory Mairs.
