= Hannah Krüger =

German field hockey player

Personal information
- Born: 4 September 1988 (age 37) Nuremberg, Bavaria, West Germany
- Height: 1.73 m (5 ft 8 in)
- Weight: 67 kg (148 lb)

Sport
- Sport: Field hockey
Medal record
Women's field hockey
Representing Germany
Olympic Games
Bronze medal – third place	2016 Rio de Janeiro	Team

Hannah Erlach (née Krüger, born 4 September 1988) is a German field hockey player. She represented her country at the 2016 Summer Olympics.
