= Lisa Schütze =

German field hockey player

Personal information
- Full name: Lisa Marie Schütze
- Born: 5 October 1996 (age 29)
- Height: 1.72 m (5 ft 8 in)
- Weight: 61 kg (134 lb)

Sport
- Sport: Field hockey
- Position: Midfield
National team
Years	Team	Caps	Goals
2014–2016	Germany	55	(8)
Medal record
Women's field hockey
Representing Germany
Summer Olympics
Bronze medal – third place	2016 Rio de Janeiro	Team
FIH World League
Bronze medal – third place	2014–15 Rosario	Team

Lisa Schütze (born 5 October 1996) is a German field hockey player. She represented her country at the 2016 Summer Olympics.
