= Franzisca Hauke =

German field hockey player

Personal information
- Born: 10 September 1989 (age 36) Hamburg, West Germany
- Height: 1.72 m (5 ft 8 in)
- Weight: 63 kg (139 lb)

Sport
- Sport: Field hockey
- Position: Midfielder
- Club: Harvestehuder THC
National team
Years	Team	Caps	Goals
2011–2021	Germany	152	(15)
Medal record
Women's field hockey
Representing Germany
Olympic Games
Bronze medal – third place	2016 Rio de Janeiro	Team
European Championship
Silver medal – second place	2019 Antwerp
Silver medal – second place	2021 Amstelveen
Indoor World Cup
Gold medal – first place	2018 Berlin

Franzisca Hauke (born 10 September 1989) is a German field hockey player. She represented her country at the 2016 Summer Olympics and the 2020 Summer Olympics. Her brother, Tobias Hauke plays also field hockey for the German national team.

== Education ==
Hauke completed her abitur in 2009 at the Gelehrtenschule des Johanneums.
