= Pia-Sophie Oldhafer =

German field hockey player

Personal information
- Born: 1 July 1992 (age 34) Hanover, Germany
- Height: 1.66 m (5 ft 5 in)
- Weight: 55 kg (121 lb)

Sport
- Sport: Field hockey
Senior career
Years	Team	Caps	Goals
–2014	Eintracht Braunschweig	-	-
2014–2015	Oranje Zwart	-	-
2015–	Rot-Weiss Köln	-	-
National team
Years	Team	Caps	Goals
2013–	Germany	64	(9)
Medal record
Olympic Games
Bronze medal – third place	2016 Rio de Janeiro	Team

Pia-Sophie Oldhafer (born 1 July 1992) is a German field hockey player. She represented her country at the 2016 Summer Olympics.
