= Hockey at the 1998 Commonwealth Games – Women's team squads =

This article lists the squads of the women's hockey competition at the Bukit Jalil Stadium in Kuala Lumpur, Malaysia from 9 – 20 September 1998.

== Australia ==
Head coach: Ric Charlesworth

- Katie Allen
- Michelle Andrews
- Alyson Annan
- Louise Dobson
- Juliet Haslam
- Rechelle Hawkes (c)
- Rachel Imison
- Bianca Langham
- Claire Mitchell-Taverner
- Nikki Mott
- Alison Peek
- Katrina Powell
- Lisa Powell
- Justine Sowry (gk)
- Kate Starre
- Kristen Towers

== Canada ==
Head coach: Dru Marshall

- Sue Armstrong
- Michelle Bowyer
- Lisa Faust
- Sarah Forbes (gk)
- Aoibhinn Grimes
- Ann Harada
- Chris Hunter
- Laurelee Kopeck
- Amy MacFarlane
- Karen MacNeill
- Carla Somerville
- Bobbi Jo Steadward
- Kristen Taunton
- Sue Tingley
- Julia Wong
- Jenny Zinkan-McGrade

== England ==
Head coach:

- Jennie Bimson
- Kirsty Bowden (c)
- Karen Brown
- Melanie Clewlow
- Tina Cullen
- Jackie Empson
- Fiona Greenham
- Kerry Moore
- Denise Marston-Smith
- Lucy Newcombe
- Mandy Nicholson
- Carolyn Reid (gk)
- Hilary Rose (gk)
- Jane Sixsmith
- Jane Smith
- Lucilla Wright

== India ==
Head coach:

- Renu Bala
- Suman Bala
- Sanggai Chanu
- Tingongleima Chanu (gk)
- Kamla Dalal
- Sunita Dalal
- Suraj Lata Devi
- Ferdina Ekka
- Sita Gussain
- Manjinder Kaur
- Sandeep Kaur (c)
- Nidhi Khullar
- Jyoti Sunita Kullu
- Helen Mary (gk)
- Pritam Rani Siwach
- Marystella Tirkey

== Jamaica ==
Head coach: Basil Cunningham

- Andrea Allen
- Azra Blythe
- Kadene Brown
- Bridgette Bruce
- Dana-Mae Crawford
- Nicole Grant
- Andrea Hoo
- Ann Marie
- Cicola Reid
- Sharee Russell
- Andrea Stephenson
- Carla Thomas
- Camelle Wallace
- Karen Wilson

== Malaysia ==
Head coach:

- Seyamala Subramaniam
- Roslina Basir Mohd Nasir
- Nelfianty Mohd Rasyid
- Anita Teng Hooi Hoon
- Munaziah Mulim
- Rosmimi Jamalani
- Azini Ismail
- Yuwama Abd. Rahman
- Norliza Sahli
- Yasmin Mazia Mustapa
- Izatuldiana Idris
- Nuriza Sulaiman
- Teo Poo Siap
- Daring Nyokin
- Che Inan Melati Che Ibrahim
- Lim Siew Gek

== Namibia ==
Head coach:

- Penny Ankama
- Andrea Beiter
- Judith Block
- Shayne Myree Cormack
- Trenor Cormack
- Cecilia Lydia Els
- Silke M. Erdmannsky
- Bianca S. Hoebel
- Yolande Karg
- Mariaan Ceile Lubbe
- Michele Milho
- Janine Pretorius
- Megan Schlange
- Randolph Slabbert
- Elmar Spangenberg
- Helen Maria Thorburn

== New Zealand ==
Head coach:

- Tina Bell-Kake
- Sandy Bennett
- Helen Clarke (gk)
- Jenny Duck
- Emily Gillam
- Skippy Hamahona
- Anna Lawrence (c)
- Robyn Matthews
- Suzie Pearce
- Moira Senior
- Jenny Shepherd
- Karen Smith (gk)
- Mandy Smith
- Kate Trolove
- Lisa Walton
- Diana Weavers

== Scotland ==
Head coach:

- Louise Burton
- Carrie Corcoran
- Alison Denholm
- Sue Fraser
- Susan Gilmour
- Alison Grant
- Janet Jack
- Sue Lawrie (gk)
- Sue Macdonald
- Valerie Neil
- Fiona Pearson
- Diane Renilson
- Pauline Robertson (c)
- Tracey Robb (gk)
- Rhona Simpson
- Helen Walker

== South Africa ==
Head coach: Boudewijn Castelijn

- Hanneli Arnoldi
- Kerry Bee
- Zanelle Burger
- Lindsey Carlisle
- Pietie Coetzee
- Sharon Cormack
- Alison Dare
- Megan Dobson
- Nicky Du Toit (gk)
- Jackie Gyser
- Anli Kotze
- Michele MacNaughton
- Karen Roberts (c)
- Carina van Zyl
- Inke van Wyk (gk)
- Susan Wessels

== Trinidad & Tobago ==
Head coach:

- Sherlan Cabralis
- Celia Cropper
- Nicole Dixon
- Michelle Edwards
- Christabella George-Ford
- Beryl Homer
- Mauvreen Jacob
- Kathleen La Rode
- Yvette La Rode
- Richelle Mitchell
- Tanara Nancoo
- Reyah Richardson
- Stacey Siu Butt
- Penelope Stephens
- Michelle Thornhill
- Orie Trotman

== Wales ==
Head coach: Margaret Medlow

- Ann Bevan
- Michelle Daltry
- Louise Ellis
- Emma James
- Caroline Jones
- Charlotte Merrett
- Rachel O'Brien
- Sarah Powell
- Michelle Robertson
- Kate Thomas
- Michelle Thomas
- Rachel Thomas
- Lynda Watkin
- Annie Williams
- Justine Williams
- Lauren Williams

== See also ==
- Hockey at the 1998 Commonwealth Games – Men's team squads
