= Field hockey at the 1999 Pan American Games – Women's tournament =

Women's field hockey at the 1999 Pan American Games
Tournament details
- Host country: Canada
- City: Winnipeg
- Dates: 24 July – 4 August
- Teams: 7
- Venue: Kildonan East Collegiate

Final positions
- Champions: Argentina (4th title)
- Runner-up: United States
- Third place: Canada

Tournament statistics
- Matches played: 23
- Goals scored: 84 (3.65 per match)
- Top scorer: (Argentina) Vanina Oneto (8 goals)

The women's field hockey tournament at the 1999 Pan American Games was the 4th edition of the field hockey event for women at the Pan American Games. It was held over an eleven-day period beginning on 24 July, and culminating with the medal finals on 4 August. All games were played at the Kildonan East Collegiate in Winnipeg, Canada.

Argentina won the gold medal for a record fourth time after defeating the United States 5–2 in the final. Canada won the bronze medal by defeating Trinidad and Tobago 2–0.

The tournament served as the Pan American qualifier for the 2000 Summer Olympics in Sydney, Australia.

== Qualification ==
Alongside the host nation, who received an automatic berth, seven teams participated in the tournament.

Dates	Event	Location	Quotas	Qualifier(s)
12–25 March 1995	1999 Pan American Games	Mar del Plata, Argentina	5	Argentina; Canada; Cuba; Trinidad and Tobago; United States
10–20 August 1998	1998 CAC Games	Caracas, Venezuela	1	Mexico
1998	1998 South American Championship	Santiago, Chile	1	Chile
Total			7	

== Officials ==
The following umpires were appointed by the PAHF and FIH to officiate the tournament.

- Soledad Iparraguirre (ARG)
- Janice McClintock (CAN)
- Cecilia Valenzuela (CHL)
- Joanne Cabrera (CUB)
- Gillian Clarke (ENG)
- Gina Spitaleri (ITA)
- Alicia Takeda (MEX)
- Lisa Marcano (TTO)
- Judith Brinsfield (USA)

== Results ==
=== Preliminary round ===
==== Pool ====
Pos	Team	Pld	W	D	L	GF	GA	GD	Pts	Qualification
1	Argentina	6	6	0	0	23	2	+21	18	Final
2	United States	6	5	0	1	13	2	+11	15	Final
3	Canada (H)	6	4	0	2	20	5	+15	12	Bronze-medal match
4	Trinidad and Tobago	6	2	1	3	5	14	−9	7	Bronze-medal match
5	Cuba	6	2	0	4	12	16	−4	6	
6	Chile	6	0	2	4	2	19	−17	2	
7	Mexico	6	0	1	5	0	17	−17	1	

Source: PAHF
(H) Hosts

==== Fixtures ====
24 July 1999
13:00

Trinidad and Tobago	2–1	Cuba
Trotman 44', 65'	Report	Angelo 2'

Umpires:
Cecilia Valenzuela (CHL)
Gillian Clarke (ENG)

24 July 1999
15:00

Canada	1–3	Argentina
MacNeill 30'	Report	Aymar 14'; Rognoni 32'; Gulla 53'

Umpires:
Gina Spitaleri (ITA)
Judith Brinsfield (USA)

25 July 1999
11:00

Chile	0–7	Cuba
	Report	Angelo 9', 32'; Yaq. Torres 22', 48', 50', 63'; Puente 39'

Umpires:
Alicia Takeda (MEX)
Lisa Marcano (TTO)

25 July 1999
13:00

Mexico	0–5	Canada
	Report	Faust 25', 46'; MacFarlane 35', 38'; Taunton 65'

Umpires:
Soledad Iparraguirre (ARG)
Cecilia Valenzuela (CHL)

25 July 1999
15:00

United States	2–0	Trinidad and Tobago
James 6'; Barber 11'	Report

Umpires:
Janice McClintock (CAN)
Joanne Cabrera (CUB)

26 July 1999
13:00

Argentina	4–0	Chile
Margalot 5'; De la Paz Hernández 43', 57'; Oneto 52'	Report

Umpires:
Gillian Clarke (ENG)
Judith Brinsfield (USA)

27 July 1999
11:00

Cuba	3–0	Mexico
M. Hernández 12'; Yaq. Torres 37'; Rosales 65'	Report

Umpires:
Cecilia Valenzuela (CHL)
Gina Spitaleri (ITA)

27 July 1999
13:00

Canada	0–1	United States
	Report	Fillat 49'

Umpires:
Soledad Iparraguirre (ARG)
Alicia Takeda (MEX)

27 July 1999
15:00

Trinidad and Tobago	0–4	Argentina
	Report	Oneto 16', 67'; Gulla 58', 64'

Umpires:
Joanne Cabrera (CUB)
Janice McClintock (CAN)

28 July 1999
11:00

Mexico	0–0	Chile
	Report

Umpires:
Lisa Marcano (TTO)
Gillian Clarke (ENG)

28 July 1999
13:00

Cuba	1–5	Canada
Puente 52'	Report	Tingley 21'; Grimes 27', 60'; MacNeill 47'; Taunton 62'

Umpires:
Judith Brinsfield (USA)
Gina Spitaleri (ITA)

29 July 1999
13:00

Argentina	2–1	United States
Masotta 41'; Rognoni 67'	Report	James 62'

Umpires:
Gina Spitaleri (ITA)
Gillian Clarke (ENG)

30 July 1999
16:00

Chile	2–2	Trinidad and Tobago
D. Infante 19', 39'	Report	Trotman 45'; De Roche 60'

Umpires:
Joanne Cabrera (CUB)
Soledad Iparraguirre (ARG)

30 July 1999
18:00

United States	4–0	Cuba
Reeve 2'; Tagliente 20'; Barber 46'; Rizzo 64'	Report

Umpires:
Janice McClintock (CAN)
Alicia Takeda (MEX)

30 July 1999
20:00

Argentina	5–0	Mexico
Aicega 14'; Masotta 29', 46'; Aymar 32'; García 61'	Report

Umpires:
Judith Brinsfield (USA)
Cecilia Valenzuela (CHL)

31 July 1999
17:00

Chile	0–4	Canada
	Report	Grimes 9'; Faust 27'; MacNeill 52'; Somerville 61'

Umpires:
Lisa Marcano (TTO)
Soledad Iparraguirre (ARG)

1 August 1999
16:00

Mexico	0–3	United States
	Report	Werley 27'; James 62'; Lucas 66'

Umpires:
Gina Spitaleri (TTO)
Lisa Marcano (TTO)

1 August 1999
18:00

Canada	5–0	Trinidad and Tobago
MacFarlane 33'; MacNeill 40', 44'; Tingley 55'; Armstrong 67'	Report

Umpires:
Alicia Takeda (MEX)
Cecilia Valenzuela (CHL)

1 August 1999
20:00

Cuba	0–5	Argentina
	Report	García 4'; Oneto 16', 19', 49'; Gulla 62'

Umpires:
Janice McClintock (CAN)
Judith Brinsfield (USA)

2 August 1999
18:00

Trinidad and Tobago	1–0	Mexico
Dixon 21'	Report

Umpires:
Alicia Takeda (MEX)
Gillian Clarke (ENG)

2 August 1999
20:00

United States	2–0	Chile
Barber 40'; Fillat 49'	Report

Umpires:
Joanne Cabrera (CUB)
Lisa Marcano (TTO)

=== Medal round ===
==== Bronze-medal match ====
4 August 1999
11:30

Canada	2–0	Trinidad and Tobago
Kopeck 32', 41'	Report

Umpires:
Alicia Takeda (MEX)
Soledad Iparraguirre (ARG)

==== Final ====
4 August 1999
16:00

Argentina	5–2	United States
Oneto 16', 35'; Aicega 42'; Masotta 47'; Gulla 67'	Report	Werley 2'; Tagliente 35'

Umpires:
Gina Spitaleri (ITA)
Gillian Clarke (ENG)

Team details

GK	Mariela Antoniska
DF	Ayelén Stepnik
DF	Magdalena Aicega
DF	Mercedes Margalot
MF	Inés Arrondo
MF	Anabel Gambero
MF	Luciana Aymar	29'
MF	Jorgelina Rimoldi
FW	Alejandra Gulla
FW	Vanina Oneto	47'
FW	Karina Masotta
Substitutions:
Manager:

GK
DF
MF
MF
MF
MF
FW
FW
FW
Substitutions:
FW
DF

Margaret Storrar
Jill Reeve	47'
Kris Fillat
Tracey Fuchs	10'
Antoinette Lucas
Jana Toepel
Katie Kauffman
Kate Barber
Kelli James
Michelle Vizzuso
Cindy Werley
Mimi Smith	Substituted on
Eleanor Race	Substituted on
Carla Tagliente	Substituted on
Chris DeBow	Substituted on

== Statistics ==
=== Final standings ===
Pos	Team	Qualification
1st place, gold medalist(s)	Argentina	2000 Summer Olympics
2nd place, silver medalist(s)	United States	2000 Olympic Qualifier
3rd place, bronze medalist(s)	Canada (H)	
4	Trinidad and Tobago	
5	Cuba	
6	Chile	
7	Mexico	

Source: PAHF
(H) Host

=== Goalscorers ===
There were 84 goals scored in 23 matches, for an average of 3.65 goals per match.

8 goals

- (Argentina) Vanina Oneto

5 goals

- (Argentina) Alejandra Gulla
- (Canada) Karen MacNeill
- (Cuba) Yaquelín Torres

4 goals

- (Argentina) Karina Masotta

3 goals

- (Canada) Lisa Faust
- (Canada) Aoibhinn Grimes
- (Canada) Amy MacFarlane
- (Cuba) Greter Angelo
- (Trinidad and Tobago) Oire Trotman
- (United States) Katherine Barber
- (United States) Kelli James

2 goals

- (Argentina) Magdalena Aicega
- (Argentina) Luciana Aymar
- (Argentina) Soledad García
- (Argentina) María de la Paz Hernández
- (Argentina) Cecilia Rognoni
- (Canada) Laurelee Kopeck
- (Canada) Kristen Taunton
- (Canada) Sue Tingley
- (Chile) Daniela Infante
- (Cuba) Yadira Puente
- (United States) Kris Fillat
- (United States) Carla Tagliente
- (United States) Cindy Werley

1 goal

- (Argentina) Mercedes Margalot
- (Canada) Sue Armstrong
- (Canada) Carla Somerville
- (Cuba) María Hernández
- (Cuba) Yunelís Rosales
- (Trinidad and Tobago) Nicole Dixon
- (Trinidad and Tobago) Dixie-Ann de Roche
- (United States) Antoinette Lucas
- (United States) Jillian Reeve
- (United States) Dina Rizzo
