= 1997 Women's Intercontinental Cup =

Field hockey tournament

Tournament details
- Host country: Zimbabwe
- City: Harare
- Teams: 12
- Venue: 1

Final positions
- Champions: South Africa
- Runner-up: New Zealand
- Third place: Scotland

Tournament statistics
- Matches played: 42
- Goals scored: 173 (4.12 per match)
- Top scorer: (South Africa) Pietie Coetzee (15 goals)

The 1997 Women's Intercontinental Cup was a qualifier for the 1998 Women's Hockey World Cup and was held in the Magamba Stadium in Harare, Zimbabwe, from Friday 1 August to Tuesday 12 August 1997. Twelve nations took part, divided into two groups of six in the preliminary round. The top six teams joined Argentina, Olympic champions Australia, Germany, South Korea, the United States and hosts the Netherlands.

== Qualified Teams ==
Dates	Event	Location	Quotas	Qualifiers
–	Host Nation		1	Zimbabwe
18–29 August 1999	1994 World Cup	Dublin, Ireland	6	Canada; China; England; Ireland; Russia; Spain
16–27 October 1996	Inter Nations Cup	Port of Spain, Trinidad and Tobago	5	India; Japan; New Zealand; Scotland; South Africa
Total			12	

== Squads ==
=== Canada ===
Dana Anderson, Sue Armstrong, Nicole Colaco, Lisa Faust, Sarah Forbes (gk), Aoibhinn Grimes, Chris Hunter, Laurelee Kopeck, Amy MacFarlane, Karen MacNeill, Veronica Planella, Gillian Sewell, Carla Somerville, Sue Tingley, Krista Thompson (gk), and Candy Thomson. Head Coach: Dru Marshall.

=== India ===
Tingonleima Chanu (gk), Helen Mary (gk), Sandeep Khaur, Shashi Bala (captain), Maristella Tirkey, Mukta Xalco, Sita Gussain, Sumrai Tete, Sunita Dalal, Nidhi Khullar, Manjinder Kaur, Pritam Thakran, Kamala Dalal, Suraj Lata Devi, Jyoti Sunita Kullu, and Ferdina Ekka. Head coach: Balbir Singh.

== Preliminary round ==
=== Pool A ===
Pos	Team	Pld	W	D	L	GF	GA	GD	Pts	Qualification
1	South Africa	5	4	1	0	20	6	+14	13	Semi-finals
2	India	5	3	0	2	7	6	+1	9	Semi-finals
3	England	5	2	3	0	10	7	+3	9	Fifth to eighth place
4	Ireland	5	1	1	3	5	10	−5	4	Fifth to eighth place
5	Japan	5	1	1	3	10	15	−5	4	Ninth to twelfth place
6	Canada	5	0	2	3	5	13	−8	2	Ninth to twelfth place

Source: Field Hockey Canada
Rules for classification: 1) points; 2) matches won; 3) goal difference; 4) goals for; 5) head-to-head result; 6) field goals for.

1 August 1998
14:30

India	1–0	Ireland
Sandeep 67'	Report

1 August 1998
16:30

England	1–1	Canada
Smith 15'	Report	Colaco 36'

1 August 1998
20:30

Japan	1–6	South Africa
Miura 38'	Report	Coetzee 3', 14', 44'; MacNaughton 47'; Wessels 53'; Bentley 61'

2 August 1998
18:00

India	0–1	England
	Report	Marston-Smith 60'

2 August 1998
20:00

South Africa	3–0	Ireland
Coetzee 18', 41'; Calder 20'	Report

3 August 1998
14:00

Canada	2–4	Japan
MacFarlane 12'; Grimes 32'	Report	Kato 14', 43'; Morimoto 16'; Iwao 68'

4 August 1998
16:00

Canada	1–4	South Africa
MacFarlane 12'	Report	Coetzee 12', 42'; Wessels 49'; Bee 70'

4 August 1998
18:00

Japan	2–3	India
Miura 14'; Kato 50'	Report	Jyoti 8'; Pritam 27', 61'

4 August 1998
20:00

England	3–1	Ireland
Smith 10'; Miller 15'; Marston-Smith 54'	Report	Thompson 64'

6 August 1998
14:00

South Africa	3–0	India
Coetzee 21', 30', 47'	Report

6 August 1998
16:00

Ireland	1–1	Canada
Turner 68'	Report	MacFarlane 45'

6 August 1998
18:00

Japan	1–1	England
Kato 14'	Report	Marston-Smith 59'

7 August 1998
18:00

England	4–4	South Africa
Cullen 10'; Sixsmith 13', 34'; Bowden 70'	Report	Dare 22', 33'; Coetzee 38', 68'

7 August 1998
20:00

India	3–0	Canada
Dalal 12'; Sandeep 33'; Pritam 54'	Report

8 August 1998
14:00

Ireland	3–2	Japan
McVicker 43'; Thompson 47'; Kelleher 63'	Report	Kato 4'; Tsukui 12'

=== Pool B ===
Pos	Team	Pld	W	D	L	GF	GA	GD	Pts	Qualification
1	New Zealand	5	3	2	0	20	6	+14	11	Semi-finals
2	Scotland	5	3	1	1	14	2	+12	10	Semi-finals
3	China	5	2	2	1	16	4	+12	8	Fifth to eighth place
4	Russia	5	2	1	2	12	8	+4	7	Fifth to eighth place
5	Spain	5	1	2	2	7	7	0	5	Ninth to twelfth place
6	Zimbabwe (H)	5	0	0	5	0	42	−42	0	Ninth to twelfth place

Source: Field Hockey Canada
Rules for classification: 1) points; 2) matches won; 3) goal difference; 4) goals for; 5) head-to-head result; 6) field goals for.
(H) Hosts

1 August 1998
18:30

China	2–2	New Zealand
Liu 20'; Huang 40'	Report	Smith 14'; Lawrence 60'

2 August 1998
14:00

Spain	1–1	Russia
Gabellanes 56'	Report	Tchegourdaeva 49'

2 August 1998
16:00

Scotland	9–0	Zimbabwe
Renilson 9'; Fraser 14'; MacDonald 18', 45'; Simpson 27', 32', 44', 47'; Neil 42'	Report

3 August 1998
16:00

Zimbabwe	0–11	China
	Report	Donghong 5', 25', 69'; Liu 13'; Yang 34', 35', 62'; Chen 39', 70'; Yu 55', 63'

3 August 1998
18:00

Russia	1–0	Scotland
Tchegourdaeva 52'	Report

3 August 1998
20:00

Spain	1–2	New Zealand
Tellería 12'	Report	Smith 24'; Lawrence 38'

5 August 1998
16:00

Scotland	1–1	New Zealand
Grant 11'	Report	Matthews 52'

5 August 1998
18:00

Spain	1–1	China
Del Mar Feito 47'	Report	Yang 37'

5 August 1998
20:00

Zimbabwe	0–8	Russia
	Report	Tchegourdaeva 15', 28', 59', 70'; Piskounova 22', 37'; Polovkova 50'; Lexina 52'

6 August 1998
20:00

Scotland	3–0	Spain
Fraser 9'; MacDonald 43', 45'	Report

7 August 1998
14:00

New Zealand	10–0	Zimbabwe
Foy 5', 60'; Matthews 24', 28'; Walton 33', 35'; Smith 41', 67'; Lawrence 43', 59'	Report

7 August 1998
16:00

Russia	0–2	China
	Report	Liu 4'; Yang 58'

7 August 1998
16:00

Zimbabwe	0–4	Spain
	Report	González 3'; Goikoetxea 25'; Motos 49'; Gabellanes 52'

7 August 1998
18:00

New Zealand	5–2	Russia
Pearce 5'; Smith 21'; Lawrence 36', 46'; Matthews 64'	Report	Piskounova 12', 31'

7 August 1998
20:00

China	0–1	Scotland
	Report	Simpson 60'

== Classification round ==
=== Ninth to twelfth place ===
Crossover
10 August
Japan	5
Zimbabwe	2
10 August
Spain	3
Canada	2

Ninth place
11 August
Japan	0
Spain	4
Eleventh place
11 August
Zimbabwe	0
Canada	5

==== Crossovers ====
10 August 1998
09:00

Japan	5–2	Zimbabwe
Kato 3'; Miura 22'; Minbuto 27'; Iwao 46'; Tsukui 54'	Report	Northcroft 56'; Edwards 62'

10 August 1998
11:30

Spain	3–2	Canada
Motos 18'; Camón 28'; Muñoz 42'	Report	Kopeck 46', 57'

==== Eleventh and twelfth place ====
11 August 1998
09:00

Zimbabwe	0–5	Canada
	Report	MacFarlane 17'; Kopeck 20'; Anderson 26', 50'; Armstrong 37'

==== Ninth and tenth place ====
11 August 1998
11:30

Japan	0–4	Spain
	Report	Motos 20', 68'; Goikoetxea 39'; Camón 60'

=== Fifth to eighth place ===
Crossover
10 August
England	2
Russia	1
10 August
China	3
Ireland	0

Fifth place
12 August
England (pen.)	1 (2)
China	1 (0)
Seventh place
12 August
Russia	4
Ireland	2

==== Crossovers ====
10 August 1998
15:00

England	2–1	Russia
Marston-Smith 15'; Cullen 57'	Report	Vasioukova 59'

10 August 1998
17:30

China	3–0	Ireland
Liu 20', 58'; Chen 63'	Report

==== Seventh and eighth place ====
12 August 1998
09:00

Russia	4–2	Ireland
	Report

==== Fifth and sixth place ====
12 August 1998
11:30

England	1–1 (a.e.t.)	China
Miller 23'	Report	Huang 58'
Penalties
	2–0

== Medal round ==
Crossover
11 August
South Africa	2
Scotland	1
11 August
New Zealand	2
India	1

Final
12 August
South Africa (pen.)	2 (4)
New Zealand	2 (3)
Third place
12 August
Scotland (pen.)	1 (2)
India	1 (0)

=== Semi-finals ===
12 August 1998
15:00

South Africa	2–1	Scotland
Bee 8'; Coetzee 48'	Report	Fraser 68'

12 August 1998
17:30

New Zealand	2–1 (a.e.t.)	India
Trolove 27'; Shepherd 81'	Report	Sandeep 39'

=== Third and fourth place ===
12 August 1998
15:00

Scotland	1–1 (a.e.t.)	India
Simpson 14'	Report	Ferdina 41'
Penalties
Fraser (penalty shoot-out scored); Robertson (penalty shoot-out scored); Jack (penalty shoot-out scored)	3–1	(penalty shoot-out scored) Sandeep; (penalty shoot-out missed) Tirkey; (penalty shoot-out missed) Pritam; (penalty shoot-out missed) Sumrai

=== Final ===
12 August 1998
17:30

South Africa	2–2 (a.e.t.)	New Zealand
Coetzee 40', 47'	Report	Foy 29'; Senior 49'
Penalties
Coetzee (penalty shoot-out scored); MacNaughton (penalty shoot-out scored); Carlisle (penalty shoot-out scored); Dobson (penalty shoot-out scored)	4–2	(penalty shoot-out scored) Lawrence; (penalty shoot-out missed) Smith; (penalty shoot-out missed) Matthews; (penalty shoot-out scored) Pearce

== Final standings ==
As per statistical convention in field hockey, matches decided in extra time are counted as wins and losses, while matches decided by penalty shoot-outs are counted as draws.

Pos	Team	Pld	W	D	L	GF	GA	GD	Pts	Status
1st place, gold medalist(s)	South Africa	7	5	2	0	24	9	+15	17	Qualified for 1998 FIH World Cup
2nd place, silver medalist(s)	New Zealand	7	4	3	0	24	9	+15	15	Qualified for 1998 FIH World Cup
3rd place, bronze medalist(s)	Scotland	7	3	2	2	16	5	+11	11	Qualified for 1998 FIH World Cup
4	India	7	3	1	3	9	9	0	10	Qualified for 1998 FIH World Cup
5	England	7	3	4	0	13	9	+4	13	Qualified for 1998 FIH World Cup
6	China	7	3	3	1	20	5	+15	12	Qualified for 1998 FIH World Cup
7	Russia	7	3	1	3	17	12	+5	10	
8	Ireland	7	1	1	5	7	17	−10	4	
9	Spain	7	3	2	2	14	9	+5	11	
10	Japan	7	2	1	4	15	21	−6	7	
11	Canada	7	1	2	4	12	16	−4	5	
12	Zimbabwe (H)	7	0	0	7	2	52	−50	0	

Source: Field Hockey Canada
(H) Hosts

== Goalscorers ==
- Note: Scorers from the seventh place match between Ireland and Russia are unknown, and hence have not been added to this list.

There were 173 goals scored in 42 matches, for an average of 4.12 goals per match.

15 goals

- (South Africa) Pietie Coetzee

6 goals

- (Japan) Akemi Kato
- (New Zealand) Anna Lawrence
- (Russia) Marina Tchegourdaeva
- (Scotland) Rhona Simpson

5 goals

- (China) Liu Ying
- (China) Yang Huiping
- (New Zealand) Amanda Smith

4 goals

- (Canada) Amy MacFarlane
- (England) Denise Marston-Smith
- (New Zealand) Robyn Matthews
- (Russia) Irina Piskounova
- (Scotland) Sue MacDonald
- (Spain) Teresa Motos

3 goals

- (Canada) Laurelee Kopeck
- (China) Chen Jianbin
- (China) Donghong Cai
- (India) Sandeep Kaur
- (India) Pritam Thakran
- (Japan) Keiko Miura
- (New Zealand) Kylie Foy
- (Scotland) Susan Fraser

2 goals

- (Canada) Dana Anderson
- (China) Huang Junxia
- (China) Yu Shenzhen
- (England) Tina Cullen
- (England) Purdy Miller
- (England) Jane Smith
- (England) Jane Sixsmith
- (Ireland) Alison Thompson
- (Japan) Sachimi Iwao
- (Japan) Toshie Tsukui
- (New Zealand) Lisa Walton
- (South Africa) Kerry Bee
- (South Africa) Alison Dare
- (South Africa) Susan Wessels
- (Spain) Núria Camón
- (Spain) Nagore Gabellanes
- (Spain) Erdoitza Goikoetxea

1 goal

- (Canada) Sue Armstrong
- (Canada) Nicole Colaco
- (Canada) Aoibhinn Grimes
- (England) Kristy Bowden
- (India) Kamla Dalal
- (India) Ferdina Ekka
- (India) Jyoti Sunita Kullu
- (Ireland) Sarah Kelleher
- (Ireland) Lynsey McVicker
- (Ireland) Jeanette Turner
- (Japan) Kozue Minbuto
- (Japan) Sakae Morimoto
- (New Zealand) Suzanne Pearce
- (New Zealand) Jennifer Shepherd
- (New Zealand) Moira Senior
- (New Zealand) Kate Trolove
- (Russia) Olga Lexina
- (Russia) Elena Polovkova
- (Russia) Tatiana Vasioukova
- (Scotland) Alison Grant
- (Scotland) Valerie Neil
- (Scotland) Diane Renilson
- (South Africa) Caryn Bentley
- (South Africa) Sherylle Calder
- (South Africa) Michele MacNaughton
- (Spain) María Cruz González
- (Spain) María del Mar Feito
- (Spain) Silvia Muñoz
- (Spain) Maider Tellería
- (Zimbabwe) Wendy Edwards
- (Zimbabwe) Sally Northcroft

== Remarks ==
- The first six (South Africa, New Zealand, Scotland, India, England and China) participated in the 1998 Women's Hockey World Cup in Utrecht, Netherlands.
