= 1995 Women's Field Hockey Olympic Qualifier =

Qualification for the 1996 Summer Olympics

Tournament details
- Host country: South Africa
- City: Cape Town
- Dates: 15–25 November
- Teams: 8
- Venue: Hartleyvale Stadium

Final positions
- Champions: South Korea
- Runner-up: Great Britain
- Third place: Germany

Tournament statistics
- Matches played: 28
- Goals scored: 69 (2.46 per match)
- Top scorer: (South Korea) Cho Eun-Jung (6 goals)

The third Women's Hockey Olympic Qualifier for the 1996 Summer Olympics in Atlanta, Georgia was held in Cape Town, South Africa, from Wednesday 15 November to Saturday 26 November 1995. Eight nations took part, and they played a round robin. The top five teams joined the other three that have already qualified: Australia, title holders Spain, and hosts the United States.

== Squads ==
Argentina

Head Coach: Rodolfo Mendoza

- Mariana Arnal (GK)
- Verónica Artica (GK)
- María Camardón
- Silvia Corvalán
- Sofía MacKenzie
- Magdalena Aicega
- Julieta Castellán
- Gabriela Sánchez
- Anabel Gambero
- Jorgelina Rimoldi
- Karina Masotta
- Vanina Oneto
- María Castelli
- Gabriela Pando
- Cecilia Rognoni
Canada

Head Coach:

- Deb Whitten (GK)
- Tara Croxford
- Laurelee Kopeck
- Nicole Colaco
- Lisa Faust
- Amy MacFarlane
- Carla Somerville
- Sue Reid
- Veronica Planella
- Karen MacNeill
- Chris Hunter
- Tammy Holt
- Gillian Sewell
- Krista Thompson
China
Germany

Head Coach: Berti Rauth

- Birgit Beyer (GK)
- Susie Wollschläger (GK)
- Simone Thomaschinski
- Eva Hagenbäumer
- Denise Klecker
- Irina Kuhnt
- Britta Becker
- Melanie Cremer
- Tanja Dickenscheid
- Heike Lätzsch
- Franziska Hentschel
- Nadine Ernsting-Krienke
- Natascha Keller
- Vanessa van Kooperen
- Philippa Suxdorf
- Katrin Kauschke
Great Britain

Head Coach: Sue Slocombe

- Joanne Thompson (GK)
- Jill Atkins
- Karen Brown
- Susan Fraser
- Lucy Cope
- Mandy Davies
- Pauline Robertson
- Tammy Miller
- Jane Sixsmith
- Susan MacDonald
- Anna Bennett
- Hilary Rose (GK)
- Rhona Simpson
- Amanda Nicholson
- Diana Renilson
- Christine Cook
Netherlands

Head Coach: Tom van 't Hek

- Jacqueline Toxopeus (GK)
- Stella de Heij (GK)
- Willemijn Duyster
- Wendy Fortuin
- Noor Holsboer
- Marlies Vossen
- Dillianne van den Boogaard
- Suzanne Plesman
- Jeannette Lewin
- Suzan van der Wielen
- Florentine Steenberghe
- Margje Teeuwen
- Nicole Koolen
- Mijntje Donners
- Ellen Kuipers
- Wietske de Ruiter
South Africa

Head Coach: Kelly Fairweather

- Caryn Bentley
- Paulene de Bruin
- Jill Dix (GK)
- C Mangion (GK)
- Jacqueline Geyser
- Nicky du Toit (GK)
- Sherylle Calder
- Gill Daniels
- Hanneli Arnoldi
- Michele MacNaughton
- Caroline Matthews
- Karen Roberts
- Lindsey Carlisle
- Sharon Cormack
- Karen Symons
- Kerry Bee
- Alison Dare
South Korea

== Results ==
=== Standings ===
Pos	Team	Pld	W	D	L	GF	GA	GD	Pts	Status
1st place, gold medalist(s)	South Korea	7	5	1	1	14	6	+8	11	Qualified for 1996 Summer Olympics
2nd place, silver medalist(s)	Great Britain	7	3	3	1	10	9	+1	9	Qualified for 1996 Summer Olympics
3rd place, bronze medalist(s)	Germany	7	4	0	3	9	7	+2	8	Qualified for 1996 Summer Olympics
4	Argentina	7	3	2	2	8	7	+1	8	Qualified for 1996 Summer Olympics
5	Netherlands	7	2	3	2	14	14	0	7	Qualified for 1996 Summer Olympics
6	China	7	3	1	3	8	9	−1	7	
7	Canada	7	1	1	5	2	7	−5	3	
8	South Africa (H)	7	1	1	5	4	10	−6	3	

Source: Todor66
Rules for classification: 1) Points; 2) Goal difference; 3) Matches won; 4) Goals for; 5) Head-to-head result.
(H) Hosts

=== Fixtures ===
15 November 1995
14:00

Argentina	3–2	Netherlands
Castelli 5', 47'; Sánchez 35'	Report	Lewin 9'; Donners 54'

Umpires:
Naomi Kato (JPN)
Gillian Clarke (GBR)

15 November 1995
16:00

South Africa	0–3	South Korea
	Report	Lee J. 6', 70'; Lee E. 65'

Umpires:
Peri Buckley (AUS)
Gina Spitaleri (ITA)

15 November 1995
19:00

China	0–1	Germany
	Report	Becker 17'

Umpires:
Angela Larío Ruíz (ESP)
Janice McClintock (CAN)

16 November 1995
17:00

Great Britain	1–1	Canada
Robertson 29'	Report	Holt 24'

Umpires:
Jean Buchanan (RSA)
Carola Heinrichs (GER)

16 November 1995
19:00

South Korea	0–1	Argentina
	Report	Rognoni 59'

Umpires:
Renée Chatas (USA)
Jane Nockolds (GBR)

17 November 1995
15:00

Netherlands	3–2	South Africa
De Ruiter 9'; Vossen 35'; Kuipers 52'	Report	Bentley 21', 58'

Umpires:
Lee Mi-ok (KOR)
Angela Larío Ruíz (ESP)

17 November 1995
17:00

China	1–0	Canada
Lin 35'	Report

Umpires:
Edna Rutten (NED)
Peri Buckley (AUS)

18 November 1995
15:00

South Africa	0–0	Argentina
	Report

Umpires:
Edna Rutten (NED)
Naomi Kato (JPN)

18 November 1995
17:00

Germany	1–2	Great Britain
Hentschel 45'	Report	Robertson 2'; Fraser 54'

Umpires:
Gina Spitaleri (ITA)
Renée Chatas (USA)

18 November 1995
19:00

South Korea	2–2	Netherlands
Chang 15'; Cho 65'	Report	De Ruiter 6'; Van der Wielen 46'

Umpires:
Carola Heinrichs (GER)
Jean Buchanan (RSA)

19 November 1995
17:00

Great Britain	1–0	China
Simpson 56'	Report

Umpires:
Lee Mi-ok (KOR)
Janice McClintock (CAN)

19 November 1995
19:00

Canada	0–2	Germany
	Report	Hentschel 44', 55'

Umpires:
Jane Nockolds (GBR)
Gillian Clarke (GBR)

20 November 1995
17:00

Canada	0–1	South Africa
	Report	Calder 38'

Umpires:
Naomi Kato (JPN)
Angela Larío Ruíz (ESP)

20 November 1995
19:00

Netherlands	2–2	China
Kuipers 14'; De Ruiter 29'	Report	Yang 9', 25'

Umpires:
Janice McClintock (CAN)
Lee Mi-ok (KOR)

21 November 1995
15:00

Germany	1–0	Argentina
Becker 8'	Report

Umpires:
Jean Buchanan (RSA)
Gillian Clarke (GBR)

21 November 1995
17:00

Great Britain	1–3	South Korea
Simpson 24'	Report	Chang 40'; Cho 57', 67'

Umpires:
Peri Buckley (AUS)
Angela Larío Ruíz (ESP)

22 November 1995
13:00

Argentina	1–0	Canada
Rognoni 61'	Report

Umpires:
Lee Mi-ok (KOR)
Carola Heinrichs (GER)

22 November 1995
15:00

South Korea	3–1	China
Kwon 5'; Cho 21'; Woo 59'	Report	Cai 56'

Umpires:
Gillian Clarke (GBR)
Naomi Kato (JPN)

22 November 1995
17:00

South Africa	0–1	Germany
	Report	Ernsting-Krienke 67'

Umpires:
Jane Nockolds (GBR)
Gina Spitaleri (ITA)

22 November 1995
19:00

Great Britain	2–2	Netherlands
Simpson 26'; Susan Fraser 41'	Report	Van der Wielen 8'; Lewin 38'

Umpires:
Janice McClintock (CAN)
Renée Chatas (USA)

23 November 1995
15:00

China	2–1	South Africa
Chen Jia. 2'; Chen Jin. 70'	Report	Bentley 18'

Umpires:
Edna Rutten (NED)
Naomi Kato (JPN)

23 November 1995
17:00

Netherlands	0–1	Canada
	Report	MacNeill 67'

Umpires:
Jane Nockolds (GBR)
Gina Spitaleri (ITA)

24 November 1995
15:00

Argentina	2–2	Great Britain
Castelli 24', 45'	Report	Nicholson 14'; Fraser 70'

Umpires:
Carola Heinrichs (GER)
Lee Mi-ok (KOR)

24 November 1995
17:00

South Korea	2–1	Germany
Cho 16'; Lee J. 57'	Report	Ernsting-Krienke 52'

Umpires:
Peri Buckley (AUS)
Angela Larío Ruíz (ESP)

25 November 1995
13:00

Argentina	1–2	China
Oneto 41'	Report	Yang 43', 64'

Umpires:
Gina Spitaleri (ITA)
Angela Larío Ruíz (ESP)

25 November 1995
15:00

Great Britain	1–0	South Africa
Simpson 29'	Report

Umpires:
Renée Chatas (USA)
Janice McClintock (CAN)

25 November 1995
17:00

Canada	0–1	South Korea
	Report	Cho 61'

Umpires:
Carola Heinrichs (GER)
Jean Buchanan (RSA)

25 November 1995
19:00

Germany	2–3	Netherlands
Hentschel 6', 65'	Report	De Ruiter 33', 53'; Van den Boogaard 36'

Umpires:
Peri Buckley (AUS)
Lee Mi-ok (KOR)

== Final standings ==
- The top five teams qualified for the 1996 Summer Olympics in Atlanta, Georgia.
1. South Korea
2. Great Britain
3. Germany
4. Argentina
5. Netherlands
6. China
7. Canada
8. South Africa

== Goalscorers ==
There were 69 goals scored in 28 matches, for an average of 2.46 goals per match.

6 goals

- (South Korea) Cho Eun-Jung

5 goals

- (Germany) Franziska Hentschel
- (Netherlands) Wietske de Ruiter

4 goals

- (Argentina) María Castelli
- (China) Yang Huiping
- (United Kingdom) Rhona Simpson

3 goals

- (United Kingdom) Susan Fraser
- (South Africa) Caryn Bentley
- (South Korea) Lee Ji-Young

2 goals

- (Argentina) Cecilia Rognoni
- (Germany) Britta Becker
- (Germany) Nadine Ernsting-Krienke
- (United Kingdom) Pauline Robertson
- (Netherlands) Ellen Kuipers
- (Netherlands) Jeannette Lewin
- (Netherlands) Suzan van der Wielen
- (South Korea) Chang Eun-Jung

1 goal

- (Argentina) Vanina Oneto
- (Argentina) Gabriela Sánchez
- (Canada) Tammy Holt
- (Canada) Karen MacNeill
- (China) Cai Donghong
- (China) Chen Jianpin
- (China) Chen Jing
- (China) Lin Ying
- (United Kingdom) Amanda Nicholson
- (Netherlands) Dillianne van den Boogaard
- (Netherlands) Mijntje Donners
- (Netherlands) Marlies Vossen
- (South Africa) Sherylle Calder
- (South Korea) Kwon Chang-Sook
- (South Korea) Woo Hyun-Jung
- (South Korea) Lee Eun-Young

== See also ==
- 1996 Men's Field Hockey Olympic Qualifier
