= 2001 Women's Intercontinental Cup =

Field hockey tournament

2001 Women's Hockey Intercontinental Cup
Tournament details
- Host country: France
- Dates: 17–30 September
- Teams: 14
- Venue: 2 (in 2 host cities)

Final positions
- Champions: England (1st title)
- Runner-up: Russia
- Third place: Ukraine

Tournament statistics
- Matches played: 55
- Goals scored: 214 (3.89 per match)
- Top scorer: (Japan) Keiko Miura (8 goals)
- Best player: (Russia) Marina Tchegourdaeva

The 2001 Women's Hockey Intercontinental Cup was the sixth edition of the women's field hockey tournament. The event was held from 17–30 September, across two host cities, Abbeville and Amiens in France.

England won the tournament for the first time after defeating Russia 4–0 in the final. Ukraine finished in third place, defeating Japan 4–3 in penalties following a 1–1 draw.

The tournament served as a qualifier for the 2002 FIH World Cup in Perth, with the top six teams qualifying automatically. The seventh placed team qualified to the three–match playoff series held in Cannock, which was to be played against the United States.

== Qualification ==
All five confederations received quotas for teams to participate allocated by the International Hockey Federation based upon the FIH World Rankings. Those teams participated at their respective continental championships but could not qualify through it, and they received the chance to qualify through this tournament based on the final ranking at each competition.

Dates	Event	Location	Qualifier(s)
7–11 November 1998	1998 Hockey African Cup for Nations	Harare, Zimbabwe	—^{1}
18–29 August 1999	1999 EuroHockey Nations Championship	Cologne, Germany	England; Russia; Scotland; Ukraine; Lithuania; Ireland; France; Belgium
2–10 December 1999	1999 Hockey Asia Cup	New Delhi, India	India; Japan; Kazakhstan; Malaysia
8–18 March 2001	2001 Pan American Cup	Kingston, Jamaica	—^{2} Canada; Uruguay

^1 – Kenya withdrew from participating.
^2 – United States withdrew from participating.

== Squads ==
Below is the list of participating squads.

Belgium
(1.) Daphné Heskin, (2.) Anne-Sophie De Scheemaeker, (3.) Charlotte De Vos, (4.) Isabelle Wagemans, (5.) Maïté Dequinze, (6.) Magali Demeyere, (7.) Olivia Bouche, (8.) Caroline Guisset, (9.) Sophie Turine, (10.) Valérie Van Elderen, (11.) An Christiaens, (12.) Tiffany Thys, (13.) Caroline Cuylits, (14.) Céline Robiette, (15.) Barbara Dequinze, (16.) Elke Mertens, (17.) Anne-Sophie Van Regemortel, and (18.) Miek Vandevenne.
Canada
(3.) Lisa Faust, (4.) Amy MacFarlane, (5.) Deb Cuthbert, (6.) Jenny Johnson, (7.) Sue Tingley, (8.) Aoibhinn Grimes, (9.) Julia Wong, (10.) Kristen Taunton, (11.) Karen MacNeill, (12.) Carla Somerville, (13.) Laurelee Kopeck, (15.) Michelle Bowyer, (16.) Becky Price, (19.) Andrea Rushton, (20.) Kelly Rezansoff, (22.) Emily Rix, (23.) Amy Agulay (gk), (30.) Krista Thompson (gk). Head Coach: Graeme "Butch" Worth.
England
(1.) Anna Bennett, (2.) Jenie Bimson, (3.) Sarah Blanks, (5.) Melanie Clewlow (captain), (6.) Tina Cullen, (7.) Helen Grant, (9.) Leisa King, (10.) Denise Marston-Smith, (11.) Purdy Miller, (12.) Mandy Nicholson, (13.) Carolyn Reid (gk), (16.) Hilary Rose (gk), (17.) Jane Smith, (18.) Rachel Walker, (19.) Kate Walsh, (21.) Lucilla Wright, (24.) Kerry Moore, (26.) Frances Houslop, and (27.) Isabel Palmer. Head Coach: Tricia Heberle.
France
India
Tingoleima Chanu (gk and captain), Helen Mary (gk), Amandeep Kaur, Suman Bala, Kanti Baa, Sita Gossain, Sumari Tete, Agnecia Lugun, Masira Surin, Neha Singh, Manjinder Kaur, Jyoti Sunita Kullu, Saggai Ibemal Chanu, Suraj Lata Devi, Pakpi Devi, Adline Kerketta, Mamta Kharab and Surinder Kaur. Head Coach: Ajay Kumar Bansal.
Ireland
(1.) Tara Browne (gk), (2.) Angela Platt (gk), (3.) Arlene Boyles, (4.) Jenny Burke, (5.) Linda Caulfield, (6.) Eimear Cregan, (7.) Karen Humphreys, (8.) Rachael Kohler, (9.) Laura Lee, (10.) Pamela Magill, (11.) Jenny McDonough, (12.) Cathy McKean, (13.) Claire McMahon, (14.) Lynsey McVicker, (15.) Ciara O'Brien, (16.) Jill Orbinson, (17.) Sarah Rand, and (18.) Daphne Sixsmith. Head Coach: Riet Kuper.
Japan
(1.) Nami Miyazaki (gk), (2.) Keiko Miura, (3.) Asuka Chiba, (5.) Sachimi Iwao, (6.) Natsumi Hori, (7.) Yuka Ogura, (8.) Sakae Morimoto, (9.) Akemi Kato, (10.) Naoko Saito, (11.) Toshi Tsukui, (12.) Rie Terazono, (13.) Chie Kimura, (14.) Kaori Chiba, (16.) Yukari Yamamoto, (17.) Yukiko Suzuki, (19.) Emiko Yokota, (21.) Yuko Morishita, and (22.) Akiko Kitada. Head Coach: Kazunori Kobayashi.
Kazakhstan
(1.) Nadezhda Sumkina (gk), (3.) Galyma Karabalinova, (4.) Olga Kikeleva, (5.) Oxana Berkalieva, (6.) Ekaterina Zhukalina, (7.) Elena Svirskaya, (8.) Ainura Mutallyapova, (9.) Elena Apelganetz, (10.) Elena Lind, (11.) Gulnara Imangalieva, (12.) Tatyana Marchenko (captain), (13.) Olga Apelganetz, (14.) Olga Shelomanova, (15.) Natalya Podshivalova, (16.) Marya Tussubzhanova (gk), and (18.) Natalya Dryamova.
Lithuania
Malaysia
(1.) Lim Siew Gek, (2.) Catherine Lumbor, (3.) Norhaliza Abdul Rahman, (4.) Norfaraha Hashim, (6.) Rosmimi Jamalani, (7.) Lisa Ludong, (8.) Daring Nyokin, (9.) Devaleela Devadasan, (10.) Mary Along, (11.) Che Inan Melati Che Ibrahim, (12.) Hamidah Birang, (13.) Munaziah Mulim, (14.) Norsaliza Ahmad Soobni, (15.) Norliza Sahli, (16.) Ernawati Mahmood, (18.) Angela Kais, (20.) Ayu Afnida Hamdani, and (21.) Vimala Subramaniam.
Russia
Scotland
Ukraine
(1.) Victoria Kotlyarenko (gk), (2.) Fyeridye Bilyalova, (3.) Aishe Ramazanova, (4.) Olena Fritche, (5.) Iryna Knyazeva, (6.) Diana Tahiyeva, (7.) Marina Dudko, (8.) Tetyana Kobzenko (captain), (9.) Svitlana Kolomiets, (10.) Olena Mykhalchenko, (11.) Natalya Vasyukova, (12.) Zhanna Savenko, (13.) Maryna Litvinchuk, (14.) Tetyana Salenko, (15.) Svitlana Petrenko, (16.) Olga Fisyun, (17.) Maryna Pyrohova, and (18.) Lyudmyla Vyhanyaylo. Head Coach: Zhuk Tetyana.
Uruguay
(1.) Andrea Fazzio (gk), (2.) Eugenia Chiara, (3.) Bettiana Ceretta, (4.) Agustina Carbone, (5.) Florencia Castagnola (captain), (6.) Patricia Bueno, (7.) Maria Ines Raiz, (8.) Rosario de los Santos, (9.) Ana Hernández, (10.) Patricia Carluccio, (11.) Virginia Silva, (12.) Rosanna Paselle (gk), (13.) Adriana Boullosa, (14.) Carla Margni, (15.) Virginia Casabo, (16.) Laura Pradines, (17.) Veronica Tutte, and (18.) Eleonora Rebollo. Head Coach: Jorge Norvay.

== Results ==
All times are Central European Summer Time (UTC+02:00)

=== Preliminary round ===
==== Pool A ====
Pos	Team	Pld	W	D	L	GF	GA	GD	Pts	Qualification
1	England	6	6	0	0	20	3	+17	18	Semi-Finals and 2002 FIH World Cup
2	Ukraine	6	3	2	1	19	17	+2	11	Semi-Finals and 2002 FIH World Cup
3	India	6	3	1	2	14	5	+9	10	
4	Ireland	6	3	1	2	9	4	+5	10	
5	France (H)	6	2	1	3	7	13	−6	7	
6	Kazakhstan	6	1	1	4	6	12	−6	4	
7	Uruguay	6	0	0	6	1	22	−21	0	

Source: Planet Field Hockey
Rules for classification: 1) points; 2) goal difference; 3) goals scored; 4) head-to-head result.
(H) Hosts

17 September 2001
11:00

India	2–0	Uruguay
Gussain 20'; Jyoti 21'	Report

Stadium:
SC Abbevillois, Abbeville

17 September 2001
13:30

Ukraine	6–4	Kazakhstan
Savenko 4', 29'; Kolomiyets 24'; Kobzenko 30'; Fritche 50'; Vasyukova 57'	Report	Svirskaya 32', 64'; Shelomanova 48', 51'

Stadium:
SC Abbevillois, Abbeville

17 September 2001
17:00

France	0–4	England
	Report	Bennett 12'; Wright 37'; King 43', 50'

Stadium:
SC Abbevillois, Abbeville

19 September 2001
10:30

Kazakhstan	2–0	Uruguay
Apelganetz 44', 64'	Report

Stadium:
SC Amiens, Amiens

19 September 2001
13:00

Ireland	1–0	India
McVicker 31'	Report

Stadium:
SC Amiens, Amiens

19 September 2001
18:00

Ukraine	2–6	England
Kobzenko 32'; Salenko 67'	Report	Clewlow 11', 23'; Blanks 23'; Smith 24', 64'; Cullen 41'

Stadium:
SC Amiens, Amiens

20 September 2001
13:00

Ireland	6–0	Uruguay
Burke 17', 53', 57', 65'; McVicker 29', 44'	Report

Stadium:
SC Amiens, Amiens

20 September 2001
18:00

Ukraine	4–3	France
Bilyalova 2'; Kobzenko 5'; Kolomiyets 19'; Savenko 22'	Report	Lazennec 27', 57'; Delloye 40'

Stadium:
SC Amiens, Amiens

20 September 2001
20:30

England	1–0	Kazakhstan
Lind 57'	Report

Stadium:
SC Amiens, Amiens

22 September 2001
13:00

India	2–2	Ukraine
Surinder 26'; Suman 58'	Report	Kolomiyets 13'; Salenko 39'

Stadium:
SC Abbevillois, Abbeville

22 September 2001
15:30

Kazakhstan	0–0	France
	Report

Stadium:
SC Abbevillois, Abbeville

22 September 2001
18:00

England	2–0	Ireland
Miller 24'; Walker 58'	Report

Stadium:
SC Abbevillois, Abbeville

23 September 2001
13:00

Uruguay	1–4	Ukraine
A. Hernández 65'	Report	Bilayova 29'; Fritche 31'; Savenko 35', 41'

Stadium:
SC Amiens, Amiens

23 September 2001
18:00

France	1–0	Ireland
Bergere 56'	Report

Stadium:
SC Amiens, Amiens

23 September 2001
20:30

England	2–1	India
King 9'; Smith 24'	Report	Jyoti 50'

Stadium:
SC Amiens, Amiens

25 September 2001
10:30

Kazakhstan	0–1	Ireland
	Report	McVicker 8'

Stadium:
SC Amiens, Amiens

25 September 2001
15:30

France	0–5	India
	Report	Mamta 10', 70'; Sanggai 51'; Jyoti 58', 65'

Stadium:
SC Amiens, Amiens

25 September 2001
18:00

Uruguay	0–5	England
	Report	Bimson 7'; King 9'; Smith 25'; Cullen 35'; Clewlow 55'

Stadium:
SC Amiens, Amiens

26 September 2001
13:00

Ireland	1–1	Ukraine
Orbinson 48'	Report	Kobzenko 38'

Stadium:
SC Abbevillois, Abbeville

26 September 2001
15:30

India	4–0	Kazakhstan
Surinder 16'; Amandeep 21'; Chanu 32'; Suman 37'	Report

Stadium:
SC Abbevillois, Abbeville

26 September 2001
18:00

Uruguay	0–3	France
	Report	Dutel 15'; Lazennec 32'; Morin 68'

Stadium:
SC Abbevillois, Abbeville

==== Pool B ====
Pos	Team	Pld	W	D	L	GF	GA	GD	Pts	Qualification
1	Russia	6	5	1	0	25	5	+20	16	Semi-Finals and 2002 FIH World Cup
2	Japan	6	5	1	0	17	1	+16	16	Semi-Finals and 2002 FIH World Cup
3	Lithuania	6	3	1	2	13	10	+3	10	
4	Scotland	6	3	1	2	11	8	+3	10	
5	Canada	6	2	0	4	10	8	+2	6	
6	Malaysia	6	1	0	5	9	29	−20	3	
7	Belgium	6	0	0	6	6	30	−24	0	

Source: Planet Field Hockey
Rules for classification: 1) points; 2) goal difference; 3) goals scored; 4) head-to-head result.

18 September 2001
13:00

Belgium	0–5	Japan
	Report	Morimoto 30', 42'; Tsukui 38'; Morishita 50'; Iwao 59'

Stadium:
SC Abbevillois, Abbeville

18 September 2001
15:30

Lithuania	2–2	Scotland
Petrutytė 32'; Gaidamaviciutė 53'	Report	Simpson 7'; MacDonald 23'

Stadium:
SC Abbevillois, Abbeville

18 September 2001
18:00

Canada	0–1	Russia
	Report	Bassaitchuk 24'

Stadium:
SC Abbevillois, Abbeville

19 September 2001
15:30

Japan	3–0	Lithuania
Miura 15', 57'; Kitada 19'	Report

Stadium:
SC Abbevillois, Abbeville

19 September 2001
18:00

Scotland	0–4	Russia
	Report	Polovkova 32', 55'; Velmatkima 43'; Vassioukova 57'

Stadium:
SC Abbevillois, Abbeville

19 September 2001
20:30

Canada	4–1	Malaysia
MacNeill 15'; Grimes 29', 50', 54'	Report	Munaziah 47'

Stadium:
SC Abbevillois, Abbeville

21 September 2001
10:30

Malaysia	1–3	Scotland
Norliza 42'	Report	Fraser 2'; Simpson 9'; Clement 56'

Stadium:
SC Abbevillois, Abbeville

21 September 2001
13:00

Russia	1–1	Japan
Kravtchenko 16'	Report	Miura 36'

Stadium:
SC Abbevillois, Abbeville

21 September 2001
18:00

Belgium	0–4	Canada
	Report	Tingley 7', 17'; MacNeill 47'; Rezansoff 65'

Stadium:
SC Abbevillois, Abbeville

22 September 2001
13:00

Malaysia	0–6	Japan
	Report	Tsukui 2', 13'; Morimoto 9'; Miura 15', 39', 65'

Stadium:
SC Amiens, Amiens

22 September 2001
18:00

Canada	2–3	Lithuania
Price 24'; Cuthbert 46'	Report	Kubilinskienė 10', 47'; Guibinaitė 36'

Stadium:
SC Amiens, Amiens

22 September 2001
20:00

Scotland	4–0	Belgium
MacDonald 26'; Lampard 44'; Grant 56'; Simpson 61'	Report

Stadium:
SC Amiens, Amiens

24 September 2001
10:30

Lithuania	3–0	Belgium
Petrutytė 20'; Zvinklytė 32'; Kubulinskienė 55'	Report

Stadium:
SC Abbevillois, Abbeville

24 September 2001
13:00

Malaysia	1–8	Russia
Norsaliza 7'	Report	Kravtchenko 20'; Dobrokhotova 26'; Tchegourdaeva 31'; Rotorgueva 33', 45', 64'; Polokova 62', 69'

Stadium:
SC Abbevillois, Abbeville

24 September 2001
18:00

Japan	1–0	Scotland
Miura 61'	Report

Stadium:
SC Abbevillois, Abbeville

25 September 2001
13:00

Russia	9–2	Belgium
Sviridova 17', 53'; Bassaitchuk 21', 68'; Kravtchenko 44', 54'; Tchegourdaeva 47'; Velmatkina 49'; E. Kravtchenko 57'	Report	Demeyere 26'; Bouché 29'

Stadium:
SC Abbevillois, Abbeville

25 September 2001
15:30

Lithuania	4–1	Malaysia
Gaidamaviciutė 1'; Kubilinskienė 7'; Petrutytė 27'; Janutaitė 69'	Report	Melati 64'

Stadium:
SC Abbevillois, Abbeville

25 September 2001
18:00

Japan	1–0	Canada
Morimoto 15'	Report

Stadium:
SC Abbevillois, Abbeville

27 September 2001
10:30

Russia	2–1	Lithuania
Kravtchenko 6'; Bassaitchuk 32'	Report	Caikauskienė 66'

Stadium:
SC Amiens, Amiens

27 September 2001
13:00

Belgium	4–5	Malaysia
Bouché 2'; Tiffany 35' van Regemortel 39'; Dequinze 61'	Report	Norsaliza 12'; Devaleela 16', 48'; Munaziah 42'; Melati 68'

Stadium:
SC Amiens, Amiens

27 September 2001
15:30

Scotland	2–0	Canada
Simpson 10', 59'	Report

Stadium:
SC Amiens, Amiens

=== Classification round ===
==== Thirteenth and fourteenth place ====
29 September 2001
08:00

Uruguay	0–3	Belgium
	Report	Christiaens 55', 68'; Turine 70'

Stadium:
SC Amiens, Amiens

==== Ninth to twelfth place classification ====
Crossover
29 September 2001
France	4
Malaysia	0
29 September 2001
Canada	5
Kazakhstan	1

Ninth Place
30 September 2001
France	3
Canada	2
Eleventh Place
30 September 2001
Malaysia	2
Kazakhstan	5

===== Crossover =====
29 September 2001
10:30

France	4–0	Malaysia
Delloye 17', 44'; Hure 53'; Bergere 60'	Report

Stadium:
SC Amiens, Amiens

29 September 2001
19:30

Canada	5–1	Kazakhstan
MacNeill 4', 56', 60'; Taunton 24'; Kopeck 31'	Report	Shelomanova 57'

Stadium:
SC Abbevillois, Abbeville

===== Eleventh and twelfth place =====
30 September 2001
10:30

Malaysia	2–5	Kazakhstan
Munazian 9'; Noriza 32'	Report	Svirskaya 16'; Apelganets 40', 54'; Shelomanova 49'; Sumkina 67'

Stadium:
SC Amiens, Amiens

===== Ninth and tenth place =====
30 September 2001
11:00

France	3–2	Canada
Llobet 21'; Brechon 55'; Lazennec 66'	Report	MacNeill 45', 47'

Stadium:
SC Abbevillois, Abbeville

==== Fifth to eighth place classification ====
Crossover
29 September 2001
India	1
Scotland (a.e.t)	2
29 September 2001
Lithuania	2 (–)
Ireland (pen.)	2 (–)

Fifth Place
30 September 2001
Scotland	1
Ireland (a.e.t)	2
Seventh Place
30 September 2001
India	–
Lithuania	–

===== Crossover =====
29 September 2001
13:00

Lithuania	2–2	Ireland
Kubilinskienė 18'; Petrutytė 34'	Report	Sixsmith 25'; McVicker 66'
Penalties
	6–5

Stadium:
SC Amiens, Amiens

The match finished 2–2 and Lithuania won the subsequent penalty shoot-out 6–5. However Ireland captain, Rachel Kohler, spotted that the penalty strokes were being taken in the wrong order. She was initially ignored by the match officials, but Ireland appealed and the tournament director ruled the shoot-out should be replayed the next day. However Lithuania refused to take part and withdrew from the tournament.

29 September 2001
17:30

India	1–2 (a.e.t.)	Scotland
Mamta 7'	Report	Valentine 27'; Simpson 82'

Stadium:
SC Abbevillois, Abbeville

===== Seventh and eighth place =====
30 September 2001
13:00

India	–	Lithuania
	Report

Stadium:
SC Amiens, Amiens

Match awarded to India following Lithuania's withdrawal.

===== Fifth and sixth place =====
29 September 2001
13:30

Scotland	1–2 (a.e.t.)	Ireland
Grant 9'	Report	Orbinson 54'; McVicker 77'

Stadium:
SC Abbevillois, Abbeville

After Ireland defeated Scotland 2–1 in this match they were initially confirmed as the final qualifier for the 2002 Women's Hockey World Cup. Before the match the Lithuania team staged a sit down protest on the pitch. Lithuania lodged a further appeal to the FIH who then ordered that Ireland, Lithuania, India and the United States take part in a second qualification tournament. Lithuania were due to play India in a seventh and eighth place play-off before they withdrew. The United States had been unable to participate in the original tournament due to the disruption of airline schedules after the 11 September attacks. However Ireland in turn appealed to the Court of Arbitration for Sport who overruled the FIH decision and finally confirmed Ireland's place in the 2002 Women's Hockey World Cup.

==== First to fourth place classification ====
Semi-finals
29 September 2001
England	2
Japan	1
29 September 2001
Russia	2
Ukraine	1

Final
30 September 2001
England	4
Russia	0
Third Place
30 September 2001
Japan	1 (3)
Ukraine (pen.)	1 (4)

===== Semi-finals =====
29 September 2001
15:30

England	2–1	Japan
Cullen 38'; Bennett 48'	Report	Kato 8'

Stadium:
SC Amiens, Amiens

29 September 2001
15:30

Russia	2–1	Ukraine
Tchegourdaeva 7', 44'	Report	Vasyukova 28'

Stadium:
SC Abbevillois, Abbeville

===== Third and fourth place =====
30 September 2001
15:30

Japan	1–1	Ukraine
Miura 15'	Report	Kolomiyets 17'
Penalties
	3–4

Stadium:
SC Amiens, Amiens

===== Final =====
30 September 2001
18:00

England	4–0	Russia
Walsh 16', 38'; Clewlow 65'; Marston-Smith 69'	Report

Stadium:
SC Amiens, Amiens

== Awards ==
Player of the Tournament	Top Goalscorer	Young Player of the Tournament
(Russia) Marina Tchegourdaeva	(Japan) Keiko Miura	(India) Sanggai Chanu

== Final standings ==
As per statistical convention in field hockey, matches decided in extra time are counted as wins and losses, while matches decided by penalty shoot-outs are counted as draws.

Pos	Team	Pld	W	D	L	GF	GA	GD	Pts	Status
1st place, gold medalist(s)	England	8	8	0	0	26	4	+22	24	Qualified for 2002 FIH World Cup
2nd place, silver medalist(s)	Russia	8	6	1	1	27	10	+17	19	Qualified for 2002 FIH World Cup
3rd place, bronze medalist(s)	Ukraine	8	3	3	2	21	20	+1	12	Qualified for 2002 FIH World Cup
4	Japan	8	5	2	1	19	4	+15	17	Qualified for 2002 FIH World Cup
5	Ireland	8	4	2	2	13	7	+6	14	Qualified for 2002 FIH World Cup
6	Scotland	8	4	1	3	14	11	+3	13	Qualified for 2002 FIH World Cup
7	India	7	3	1	3	15	7	+8	10	Qualifying Playoff Series
8	Lithuania	7	3	2	2	15	12	+3	11	
9	France (H)	8	4	1	3	14	15	−1	13	
10	Canada	8	3	0	5	17	12	+5	9	
11	Kazakhstan	8	2	1	5	12	19	−7	7	
12	Malaysia	8	1	0	7	11	38	−27	3	
13	Belgium	7	1	0	6	9	30	−21	3	
14	Uruguay	7	0	0	7	1	25	−24	0	

Source: Planet Field Hockey
(H) Hosts

== Goalscorers ==
There were 214 goals scored in 55 matches, for an average of 3.89 goals per match.

8 goals

- (Japan) Keiko Miura

7 goals

- (Canada) Karen MacNeill

6 goals

- (Ireland) Lynsey McVicker
- (Scotland) Rhona Simpson

5 goals

- (Lithuania) Aurelija Kubilinskienė
- (Russia) Nathalia Kravtchenko
- (Ukraine) Zhanna Savenko

4 goals

- (England) Melanie Clewlow
- (England) Leisa King
- (England) Jane Smith
- (France) Muriel Lazennec
- (India) Jyoti Sunita Kullu
- (Ireland) Jennifer Burke
- (Japan) Sakae Morimoto
- (Kazakhstan) Yelena Apelganetz
- (Kazakhstan) Olga Shelomanova
- (Lithuania) Dalia Petrutytė
- (Russia) Galina Bassaitchuk
- (Russia) Elena Polovkova
- (Russia) Marina Tchegourdaeva
- (Ukraine) Tetyana Kobzenko
- (Ukraine) Svitlana Kolomiyets

3 goals

- (Canada) Aoibhinn Grimes
- (England) Tina Cullen
- (France) Caroline Delloye
- (India) Mamta Kharab
- (Japan) Toshie Tsukui
- (Kazakhstan) Yelena Svirskaya
- (Malaysia) Munaziah Mulim
- (Russia) Ekaterina Rotorgueva

2 goals

- (Belgium) Olivia Bouché
- (Belgium) An Christiaens
- (Canada) Sue Tingley
- (England) Anna Bennett
- (England) Kate Walsh
- (France) Peggy Bergere
- (India) Suman Bala
- (India) Sanggai Chanu
- (India) Surinder Kaur
- (Ireland) Jill Orbinson
- (Lithuania) Giedre Gaidamaviciutė
- (Malaysia) Devaleela Devadasan
- (Malaysia) Che Inan Melati Che Ibrahim
- (Malaysia) Norliza Sahli
- (Malaysia) Norsaliza Ahmed Soobni
- (Russia) Irina Sviridova
- (Russia) Olga Velmatkima
- (Scotland) Alison Grant
- (Scotland) Susan MacDonald
- (Ukraine) Fyeridye Bilyalova
- (Ukraine) Olena Fritche
- (Ukraine) Tetyana Salenko
- (Ukraine) Natalya Vasyukova

1 goal

- (Belgium) Magali Demeyere
- (Belgium) Maïté Dequinze
- (Belgium) Anne-Sophie van Regemortel
- (Belgium) Tiffany Thys
- (Belgium) Sophie Turine
- (Canada) Deborah Cuthbert
- (Canada) Laurelee Kopeck
- (Canada) Rebecca Price
- (Canada) Kelly Rezansoff
- (Canada) Kristen Taunton
- (England) Jennifer Bimson
- (England) Sarah Blanks
- (England) Elena Lind
- (England) Denise Marston-Smith
- (England) Purdy Miller
- (England) Rachel Walker
- (England) Lucilla Wright
- (France) Stéphanie Brechon
- (France) Gwenaelle Dutel
- (France) Sophie Hure
- (France) Sophie Llobet
- (France) Aurelie Morin
- (India) Sita Gussain
- (India) Amandeep Kaur
- (Ireland) Daphne Sixsmith
- (Japan) Sachimi Iwao
- (Japan) Akemi Kato
- (Japan) Akiko Kitada
- (Japan) Yuko Morishita
- (Kazakhstan) Nadezhda Sumkina
- (Lithuania) Virginija Caikauskienė
- (Lithuania) Asura Janutaitė
- (Lithuania) Joana Guibinaitė
- (Lithuania) Jursta Zvinklytė
- (Russia) Natalia Dobrokhotova
- (Russia) Ekaterina Kravtchenko
- (Russia) Tatiana Vassioukova
- (Scotland) Linda Clement
- (Scotland) Susan Fraser
- (Scotland) Claire Lampard
- (Scotland) Cheryl Valentine
- (Uruguay) Ana Hernández
