= 1973 in Canada =

- Decades: 1950s; 1960s; 1970s; 1980s; 1990s
- See also: History of Canada; Timeline of Canadian history; List of years in Canada

Events from the year 1973 in Canada.

== Incumbents ==
=== Crown ===
- Monarch – Elizabeth II

=== Federal government ===
- Governor General – Roland Michener
- Prime Minister – Pierre Trudeau
- Chief Justice – Gérald Fauteux (Quebec) (until 23 December) then Bora Laskin (Ontario)
- Parliament – 29th (from January 4)

=== Provincial governments ===
==== Lieutenant governors ====
- Lieutenant Governor of Alberta – Grant MacEwan
- Lieutenant Governor of British Columbia – John Robert Nicholson (until February 13) then Walter Stewart Owen
- Lieutenant Governor of Manitoba – William John McKeag
- Lieutenant Governor of New Brunswick – Hédard Robichaud
- Lieutenant Governor of Newfoundland – Ewart John Arlington Harnum
- Lieutenant Governor of Nova Scotia – Victor de Bedia Oland (until October 1) then Clarence Gosse
- Lieutenant Governor of Ontario – William Ross Macdonald
- Lieutenant Governor of Prince Edward Island – John George MacKay
- Lieutenant Governor of Quebec – Hugues Lapointe
- Lieutenant Governor of Saskatchewan – Stephen Worobetz

==== Premiers ====
- Premier of Alberta – Peter Lougheed
- Premier of British Columbia – Dave Barrett
- Premier of Manitoba – Edward Schreyer
- Premier of New Brunswick – Richard Hatfield
- Premier of Newfoundland – Frank Moores
- Premier of Nova Scotia – Gerald Regan
- Premier of Ontario – Bill Davis
- Premier of Prince Edward Island – Alexander B. Campbell
- Premier of Quebec – Robert Bourassa
- Premier of Saskatchewan – Allan Blakeney

=== Territorial governments ===
==== Commissioners ====
- Commissioner of Yukon – James Smith
- Commissioner of Northwest Territories – Stuart Milton Hodgson

== Events ==
- January 25 - The Irish Stardust runs aground north of Vancouver Island, causing a large oil spill.
- February 1 - Gerald Bouey succeeds Louis Rasminsky as Governor of the Bank of Canada.
- February 5 - Work begins on the construction of the CN Tower
- February 13 - The Gendron Report is issued; it recommends making French Quebec's only official language
- February 14- Yukon Native Brotherhood tabled "Together today for our Children Tomorrow" marking the start of the Yukon Land Claims process
- February 15 - The Lester B. Pearson United World College of the Pacific is established in Victoria, British Columbia
- April 2 - Montreal announces Canada's first lottery to help pay for the 1976 Summer Olympics
- April 20 - Anik A2 is launched.
- May 10 - The Montreal Canadiens win the Stanley Cup 4 games to 2 over the Chicago Blackhawks, Yvan Cournoyer is voted MVP.
- May 23 – The Royal Canadian Mounted Police celebrate their 100th anniversary.
- July 7 - The Libertarian Party of Canada is founded.
- August - Pride Week 1973, a national gay rights event, takes place simultaneously in several of Canada's largest metropolitan cities, including Toronto, Montreal, Ottawa and Vancouver.
- August 20 - The 1973 Artistic Woodwork strike begins. It ends on December 5, 1973.
- October 17 - OPEC dramatically raises the price of oil. This is a boon to Alberta but hurts central Canada.
- November 1 - Waterloo Lutheran University is renamed Wilfrid Laurier University
- November 13 - A jury refuses to convict Henry Morgentaler for performing abortions
- November 29 - The Canadian Intergovernmental Conference Secretariat is established.
- December 7 - Canada sells its first CANDU Reactor to South Korea
- First Air is founded

== Arts and literature ==
=== New works ===
- Farley Mowat - Tundra: Selections from the Great Accounts of Arctic Land Voyages
- Donald Jack - That's Me in the Middle
- Robert Kroetsch - Gone Indian
- Elizabeth Goudie - Woman of Labrador
- Raymond Fraser - The Black Horse Tavern

=== Awards ===
- See 1973 Governor General's Awards for a complete list of winners and finalists for those awards.
- Stephen Leacock Award: Donald Bell, Saturday Night at the Bagel Factory
- Vicky Metcalf Award: Christie Harris

=== Radio ===
- The Royal Canadian Air Farce is formed

=== Television ===
- Alex Trebek moves to the United States to host The Wizard of Odds.

== Sport ==
- March 17 - Toronto Varsity Blues won their Seventh (and Fifth consecutive) University Cup by defeating the Saint Mary's Huskies 3 to 2. The Final game was played at Maple Leaf Gardens in Toronto
- May 6 - New England Whalers won the First Avco Cup by defeating the Winnipeg Jets 4 game to 1.
- May 10 - Montreal Canadiens won their Eighteenth Stanley Cup by defeating the Chicago Black Hawks 4 Games to 2. Drummondville, Quebec's Yvan Cournoyer was awarded the Conn Smythe Trophy
- May 12 - Ontario Hockey Association's Toronto Marlboros won their Sixth Memorial Cup by defeating the Quebec Major Junior Hockey League's Quebec Remparts 9-1. All games were played at the Montreal Forum.
- November 24 - Saint Mary's Huskies won their First Vanier Cup by defeating the McGill Redmen by a score of 14-6 in the 9th Vanier Cup played at Exhibition Stadium in Toronto
- November 25 - Ottawa Rough Riders won their Eighth Grey Cup by defeating Edmonton Eskimos 22-18 in the 61st Grey Cup played at CNE Stadium in Toronto. Edmonton, Alberta's Garry Lefebvre becomes First Canadian-born Grey Cup Most Valuable Canadian.

== Births ==
=== January to March ===
- January 3 - Robert Baird, swimmer
- January 4 - Greg de Vries, ice hockey player
- January 6 - Scott Ferguson, ice hockey player and coach
- January 8 - Robert Braknis, swimmer
- January 11 - Sarah Forbes, field hockey player
- January 13 - Dana Anderson, field hockey player
- January 16 - Nathalie Giguère, swimmer
- January 26 - Larissa Lowing, artistic gymnast
- February 4 - Manny Legacé, ice hockey player
- February 5 - Marty O'Donnell, boxer
- February 12 - Tara Strong, actress and businesswoman
- February 28 - Eric Lindros, ice hockey player
- March 1 - Ryan Peake, lead guitarist and backing vocalist
- March 3 - Sean Campbell, field hockey player
- March 13 - Allison Higson, swimmer
- March 24 - Philippe Boucher, ice hockey player
- March 31 - Ian Goldberg, cryptographer and cypherpunk

=== April to June ===
- April 5 - Kristin Topham, swimmer
- April 11 - Andrea Constand, Bill Cosby accuser
- April 23 - Derek Armstrong, ice hockey player
- April 25 - Paige Gordon, diver
- May 4
  - Matthew Barnaby, ice hockey player
  - John Madden, ice hockey player
- May 12 - Robert Tinkler, Canadian voice actor and screenwriter
- May 13 - Mike Beres, badminton player
- May 14 - Natalie Appleton, singer
- May 25 - Josée Corbeil, volleyball player
- June 1 - Jeff Schiebler, long-distance runner
- June 25 - René Corbet, Canadian ice hockey player

=== July to September ===
- July 3 - Adrian Aucoin, ice hockey player
- July 3 - Melanie Jans, squash player
- July 13 - Gavin Hassett, rower and Olympic silver medallist
- July 19 - Scott Walker, ice hockey player
- July 22 - Rufus Wainwright, singer-songwriter
- July 27 - Niki Jenkins, judoka
- July 27 - David McLellan, swimmer
- August 24 - Andrew Brunette, ice hockey player
- August 28 - Kirby Morrow, voice actor (d. 2020)
- August 29 - Jessica Holmes, comedian and actress
- August 31 - Scott Niedermayer, ice hockey player
- September 6 - Greg Rusedski, tennis player
- September 18 - Paul Brousseau, ice hockey player
- September 26 – Elaine Lui, television personality, co-host of etalk

=== October to December ===
- October 3 - Neve Campbell, actress
- October 5 – Annabelle Chvostek, singer-songwriter
- October 16 – Todd van der Heyden, journalist and news anchor
- October 18 – Alex Tagliani, racing driver
- October 23 - Scott Mosher, field hockey player
- October 30 - Adam Copeland, wrestler
- November 4 - Steven Ogg, actor
- November 9 - Alyson Court, actress
- November 10 - Iain Brambell, rower and Olympic bronze medallist
- November 12 - Keith Morgan, judoka
- November 14 - Moka Only, rapper and producer (Swollen Members)
- November 22 – Cassie Campbell, Canadian ice hockey forward and CBC commentator
- November 27 - Mike Oliver, field hockey player
- November 30 - Carla Somerville, field hockey player and coach
- December 1 - Brian Froud, actor and voice actor
- December 5 - Shalom Harlow, model and actress
- December 14
  - Sue Armstrong, field hockey player
  - Tomasz Radzinski, soccer player
- December 20
  - David Nedohin, curler
  - Cory Stillman, ice hockey player and coach
- December 22 - Annie Pelletier, diver and Olympic bronze medallist
- December 25 - Alexandre Trudeau, filmmaker and journalist
- December 31 - Curtis Myden, swimmer

== Deaths ==
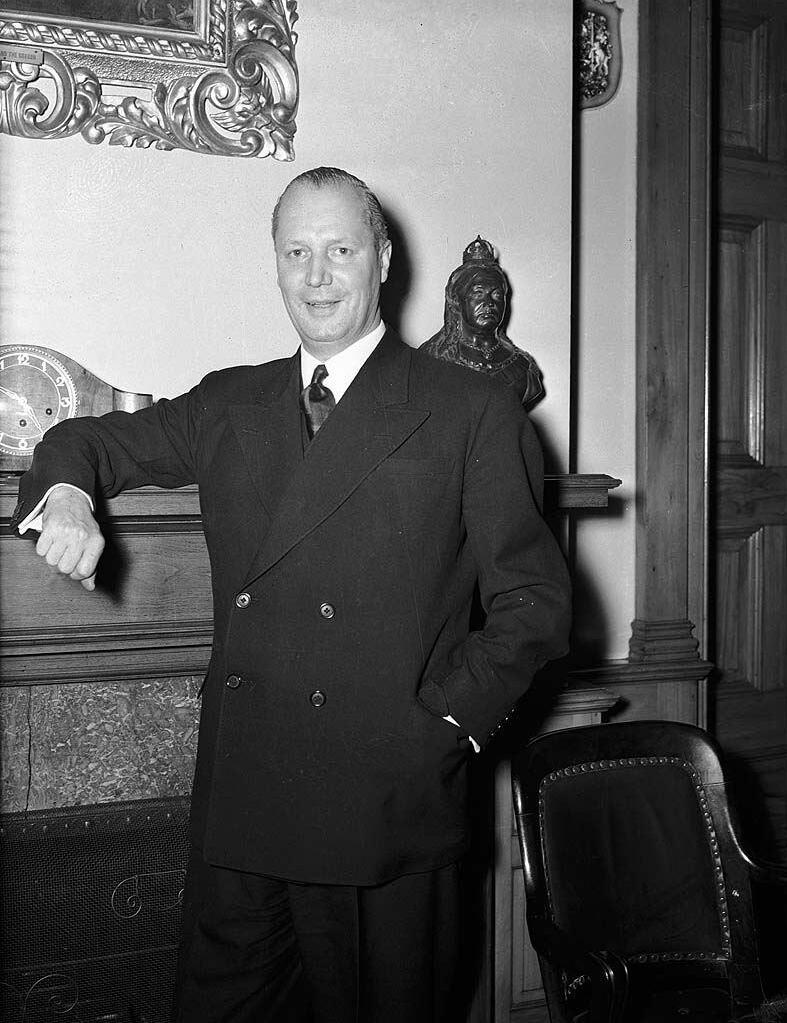
George Alexander Drew in 1947

=== January to June ===
- January 4 - George A. Drew, politician and 14th Premier of Ontario (b.1894)
- February 5 - Wilbert Ross Aylesworth, politician
- February 22 - Jean-Jacques Bertrand, politician and 21st Premier of Quebec (b.1916)
- March 2 - John Percy Page, 8th Lieutenant Governor of Alberta (b. 1887)

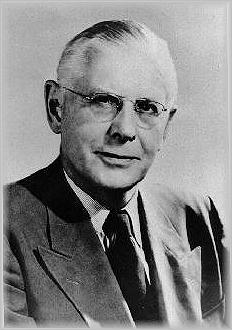
Leslie Frost

- March 11 - Tim Buck, politician and long-time leader of the Communist Party of Canada (b.1891)
- May 4 - Leslie Frost, politician and 16th Premier of Ontario (b.1895)
- May 6 - Ernest MacMillan, conductor and composer (b.1893)
- June 14 - Henry Herbert Stevens, politician and businessman (b.1878)

=== July to December ===
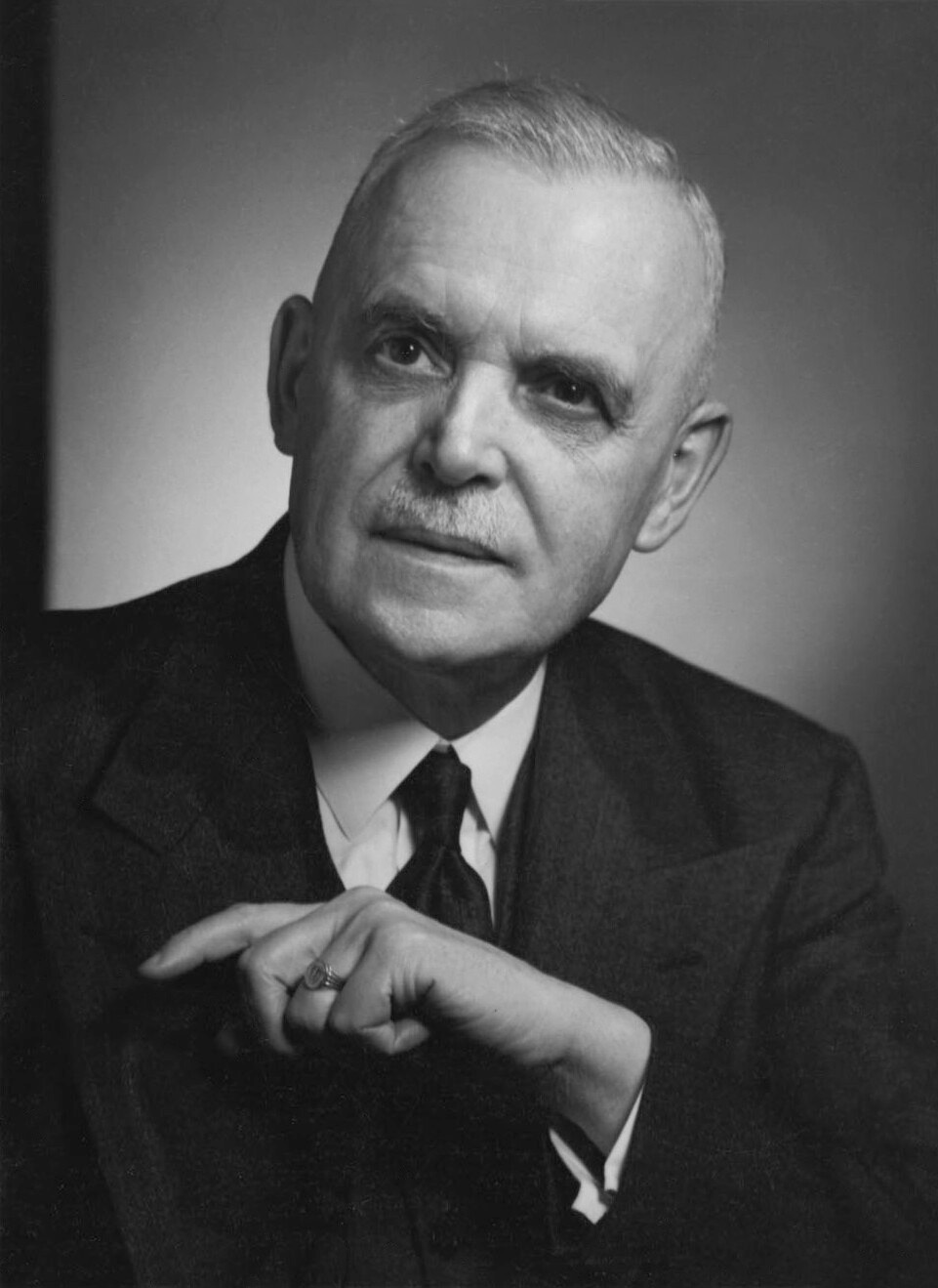
Louis St. Laurent

- July 18 - Christine Demeter, murder victim (b.1940)
- July 25 - Louis St. Laurent, politician and 12th Prime Minister of Canada (b.1882)
- July 27 - James Macdonnell, soldier, lawyer and politician (b.1884)
- September 30 – Peter Pitseolak, Inuit photographer and author (b.1902)
- December 4 - Alfred Fuller, businessman (b.1885)

=== Full date unknown ===
- William George Bock, politician (b.1884)

== See also ==
- 1973 in Canadian television
- List of Canadian films of 1973
