= Amy Agulay =

Canadian field hockey player

Amy Agulay (born September 6, 1978) is a retired field hockey goalkeeper from Canada, who earned a total number of 27 international caps for the Canadian Women's National Team during her career.

== International senior tournaments ==
- 2001 – Pan American Cup, Kingston, Jamaica (3rd)
- 2001 – World Cup Qualifier, Amiens/Abbeville, France (10th)
- 2002 – Commonwealth Games, Manchester, England (7th)
