= Nicole Colaco =

Canadian field hockey player

Nicole Colaco (born April 9, 1970 in Mombasa, Kenya) is a former field hockey player from Canada.

Colaco earned a total number of 51 international caps for the Canadian Women's National Team during her career. At the national level the Kenya-born midfielder, a resident of Scarborough, Ontario, played for G.O.A.

== International senior tournaments ==
- 1993 – World Cup Qualifier, Philadelphia, United States (3rd)
- 1994 – World Cup, Dublin, Ireland (10th)
- 1995 – Pan American Games, Mar del Plata, Argentina (3rd)
- 1995 – Olympic Qualifier, Cape Town, South Africa (7th)
- 1997 – World Cup Qualifier, Harare, Zimbabwe (11th)
