= Candy Thomson =

Canadian field hockey player

Personal information
- Full name: Candy Ann Thomson
- Born: March 8, 1967 (age 59) North Vancouver, British Columbia

Sport
- Sport: Field hockey
Medal record
Women's field hockey
Representing Canada
Pan American Games
Silver medal – second place	1991 Havana	Team competition

Candy Ann Thomson (born March 8, 1967, in North Vancouver, British Columbia) is a former field hockey player from Canada, who earned a total number of thirty international caps for the Women's Senior National Team during her career in the early 1990s. She played club hockey on national level for Vancouver Doves. Thomson was a member of the Canadian team at the 1992 Summer Olympics in Barcelona, Spain.

== International senior tournaments ==
- 1991 – Pan American Games, Havana, Cuba (2nd)
- 1992 – Summer Olympics, Barcelona, Spain (7th)
- 1997 – World Cup Qualifier, Harare, Zimbabwe (11th)
