= Lydia Campbell =

- Born: Lydia Brooks; November 1, 1818; Hamilton Inlet, Gross Water (Groswater Bay), Labrador
- Died: April 1905 (aged 86); Mulligan River, Labrador
- Spouse: William Ambrose Blake (m. 1834) Daniel Campbell ()
- Parents: Ambrose Brooks (father); Susan (mother)

Lydia Campbell née Brooks (November 1, 1818 – April 1905), born to an Inuk mother and an English father, was an early diarist in Labrador. She is one of Labrador's best known historical figures and writers, affectionately known as "Aunt Lydia".

She was born in Hamilton Inlet, Gross Water (Groswater Bay), Labrador, to Ambrose Brooks, a native of England who was employed with the Hudson's Bay Company, and Susan, his Inuk wife. She was home-schooled by her father. She was married twice: first to William Ambrose Blake in 1834, with whom she had five children, and later to Daniel Campbell with whom she had eight children. In 1894, Arthur Charles Waghorne, a clergyman, submitted her autobiography for publication; it appeared as Sketches of Labrador Life in the St John's Evening Herald. Campbell died in Mulligan River at the age of 86.

Her great niece, Elizabeth Goudie, wrote Woman of Labrador, published in 1973. In 2001, the journal of her son, Thomas L. Blake (who died in 1935), was published as a book.
