= Andy Vine =

Welsh-born Canadian folk musician

- Born: 26 April 1944 (age 81); Swansea, Wales, United Kingdom
- Origin: England
- Genres: folk rock
- Occupation: handyman
- Instrument: guitar
- Years active: 1960s – present
- Members: (on "Making Waves") Danielle Arcand (voice), Rosalie Carver (fiddle), Paul Bergman (acoustic bass), Liam McKenzie (djembe), Myles Bigelow (percussion)
- Website: andyvine.com

Andy Vine is a Welsh-born Canadian folk musician from Vancouver.

== Music ==
Andy's musical style is described as "maritime folk, old-time rock and Celtic". He released his first album "Making Waves" in 2005. One song from this album ("Woman of Labrador") was inspired by Elizabeth Goudie, a pioneer in Labrador, Canada and has been included in the Great Canadian Songbook. In 2007 Andy wrote "Excuse Me Your Planet Is Burning". Andy is now retired and living on Cortes Island, BC where he performs at local events. Many of his recordings can be heard on SoundCloud.

== Family ==
Andy has two sons and a daughter. Andy is divorced.
