= Veronica Planella =

Canadian field hockey player

Veronica Planella (born November 24, 1963, in Santiago, Chile) is a former field hockey player from Canada, Veronica was a 1992 Olympic Games squad member, who later earned several international caps for the Women's Senior National Team. Planella, a resident of Victoria, British Columbia, represented both Canada and Chile internationally. In 1985 she was named Chilean Athlete of the Year and in 1998-1999 Canadian Most Valuable Player at the National University Championships. She is a Bronze Medalist at the 1995 PanAms Games. After her hockey career she completed a master's degree in Sport and Exercise Psychology and her doctorate in coaching expertise development from the University of Victoria. Planella has worked at the National Coaching Institute and Canadian National Sport Centre, in performance psychology as an educator and strategist, performance analyst and coaching effectiveness researcher. She is also a level 4 Field hockey coach and is a coach education facilitator with the Pan American Hockey Federation (PAHF). At the present time, Veronica teaches at the University of Victoria and has her practice in performance psychology.

== International senior tournaments (for Canada) ==
- 1995 – Pan American Games, Mar del Plata, Argentina (3rd)
- 1995 – Olympic Qualifying Tournament, Cape Town, South Africa (7th)
- 1997 – World Cup Qualifier, Harare, Zimbabwe (11th)
