= Mulligan, Newfoundland and Labrador =

Abandoned settlement in Newfoundland and Labrador

Coordinates: 53.828°N 59.829°W

Location of Mulligan in Newfoundland and Labrador

Mulligan is an abandoned settlement in the Canadian province of Newfoundland and Labrador, located 66 km northeast of Happy Valley - Goose Bay.

Mulligan was enumerated in the 1945 Newfoundland census. The writer Lydia Campbell died in Mulligan.
