= Gillian Sewell =

Irish Canadian field hockey player

Gillian Sewell (born 1 November 1972 in Belfast, Northern Ireland) is a former Irish Canadian field hockey player who earned 36 international caps for the Canada during her career.

On national level Sewell, a resident of Hamilton, Ontario, has participated in the CIAU Championships for four years and has led her team to three OWIAA Championships. She has been a CIAU and conference all star from 1991 to 1994 and 1996.

The Belfast-born Sewell claimed all-star honours in Indoor Hockey as well for both Ontario and Canada. She captained the 1993 Canadian Junior World Cup Team.

== International senior tournaments ==
- 1995 – Pan American Games, Mar del Plata, Argentina (3rd)
- 1995 – Olympic Qualifier, Cape Town, South Africa (7th)
- 1997 – World Cup Qualifier, Harare, Zimbabwe (11th)
