= Elizabeth Goudie =

Canadian Inuk writer

Elizabeth Goudie (née Blake; April 20, 1902, Mud Lake, Colony of Newfoundland – June 10, 1982 Happy Valley, Labrador) was a Canadian Inuk writer. Her sole work, Woman of Labrador (ISBN 0-88778-116-0), was published in 1973.

== Life ==
Elizabeth Blake was born April 20, 1902, at Mud Lake, Labrador, Colony of Newfoundland. She is daughter of Sarah Michelin and Joseph Blake. Goudie's great aunt, Lydia Campbell, wrote the book Sketches of Labrador Life. (ISBN 1-894294-27-0)

At the age of 18, she married Jim Goudie, a trapper, with whom she had nine children. One of their children, Joe, served as member of the House of Assembly for Naskaupi (1975–1985) and held several portfolios in the administrations of Frank Moores and Brian Peckford.

In 1963, her husband died. Upon his death, Elizabeth began to reminisce about her life and decided to write it out; she completed writing in June 1971.

David Zimmerly, an anthropological researcher from Memorial University, stationed in Happy Valley, heard of Goudie's memoirs and went to talk to her. He volunteered to help her edit the memoirs for publication and spent much time during the next two years working with her. The book was published by Peter Martin Associates of Ottawa in July 1973. The original manuscript is archived in the Newfoundland and Labrador Room of the library of Memorial University.

== Honours ==
In recognition of her life and work, Goudie was awarded an honorary Doctor of Laws degree from Memorial University in 1975. In 1980, the provincial government building in Happy Valley-Goose Bay was named after her.

A song Woman Of Labrador was written by Andy Vine in 2005.

A play, "Woman of Labrador; The Elizabeth Goudie Story", starring Sherry Smith (actor), was made from her book.
