= Becky Price =

Canadian field hockey player

Becky Price (born September 8, 1974 in Richmond Hill, Ontario) is a former field hockey forward from Canada, who earned a total number of 39 international caps for the Canadian National Team during her career. She started playing field hockey in high school, and was named York University's Female Athlete of the Year in 1998.

== International senior tournaments ==
- 2001 – Pan American Cup, Kingston, Jamaica (3rd)
- 2001 – World Cup Qualifier, Amiens/Abbeville, France (10th)
- 2002 – Commonwealth Games, Manchester, UK (7th)
