= Dana Anderson =

Canadian field hockey player

Dana Anderson D'Abreo (born January 13, 1973) is a former field hockey player from Canada.

Anderson earned 57 caps for the Women's Senior National Team during her career. At national level, Anderson played for Ontario from age fifteen; and for the University of Toronto Varsity Blues from 1991 to 1996, winning CIAU Nationals in 1993 and 1996.

She is married to Men's National Team player Robin D'Abreo.

== International senior tournaments ==
- 1994 – World Cup, Dublin, Ireland (10th)
- 1995 – Pan American Games, Mar del Plata, Argentina (3rd)
- 1995 – Olympic Qualifier, Cape Town, South Africa (7th)
- 1997 – World Cup Qualifier, Harare, Zimbabwe (11th)
