= Jana Toepel =

American field hockey player

- Born: July 7, 1978 (age 47); Perkiomenville, Pennsylvania, United States

Jana Toepel (born July 7, 1978, in Perkiomenville, Pennsylvania) is a former field hockey midfielder from the United States, who made her international senior debut for the Women's National Team in 1999. The former student of the University of North Carolina was a member of the team, that won the silver medal at the 1999 Pan American Games.

== Formative years ==
Born on July 7, 1978, in Perkiomenville, Pennsylvania, Toepel graduated from Boyertown High School in the Boyertown Area School District. In 1999, as a junior at the University of North Carolina at Chapel Hill, she was a midfield/back player on the women's field hocket team.

Twice named to the National Field Hockey Coaches Association All-America first team in 1998 and 1999, she graduated from the University of North Carolina in 2001. In 1999, she was awarded All-ACC and All-ACC Tournament honors for her eighteen-game performance during a season in which she racked up five assists and seven goals for nineteen total points, despite being absent for four games while she was playing for the U.S. National Field Hockey Team in Australia.

As a senior, she was named one of the "players to watch" by ESPN College Sports.

== International senior tournaments ==
- 1999 – Pan American Games, Winnipeg, Canada (2nd)
- 2000 – Olympic Qualifying Tournament, Milton Keynes, England (6th)
