= Canadian Intergovernmental Conference Secretariat =

Canadian government agency

- Secrétariat des conférences intergouvernementales canadiennes

Agency overview
- Formed: November 29, 1973
- Jurisdiction: Canada
- Employees: 40 (2025)
- Minister responsible: Hon. Dominic LeBlanc, Minister of Intergovernmental Affairs, Infrastructure and Communities
- Agency executive: Ruth Onyancha, Secretary
- Website: www.scics.ca/en

The Canadian Intergovernmental Conference Secretariat (CICS; French: Secrétariat des conférences intergouvernementales canadiennes) is an independent Canadian government agency enacted on November 29, 1973 by an Order in Council from the first ministers created for the purpose of facilitating intergovernmental meetings in Canada. It offers planning and administrative services for meetings between first ministers, ministers and deputy ministers of provincial and territorial governments, and multilateral meetings between ministers of the provinces, territories, and the federal government. The agency reports to the Parliament of Canada through the Minister of Intergovernmental Affairs. Each of the provinces and territories of Canada has their own similar agency.

== See also ==
- First ministers conference
