= Krista Thompson (field hockey) =

Canadian field hockey player and coach

Krista Thompson (born June 15, 1972 in Chatham, New Brunswick) is a former field hockey goalkeeper from Canada, who earned a total number of 19 international caps for the Canadian National Team during her career. She was a student (Master's Degree) at the University of Victoria, and assistant coach of that university team.

== International senior tournaments ==
- 1995 – Pan American Games, Mar del Plata, Argentina (3rd)
- 1997 – World Cup Qualifier, Harare, Zimbabwe (11th)
- 2001 – World Cup Qualifier, Amiens/Abbeville, France (10th)
