= María Cruz González =

Spanish field hockey player (born 1971)

María Cruz González Álvarez (born 23 May 1971 in Madrid) is a former female field hockey player from Spain. She represented her native country at the 1996 Summer Olympics. She played club hockey for Real Club de Campo in Madrid.
