= Michelle Bowyer =

Canadian field hockey player

Michelle (Bowyer) Young (born June 25, 1976 in Calgary, Alberta) is a former field hockey forward from Canada, who earned a total number of 75 international caps for the Canadian Women's National Team during her career. She was a student of the University of Alberta, Mount Royal College and Athabasca University where she obtained a Bachelor of Physical Education and a Bachelor of Nursing.

== International senior tournaments ==
- 1995 – Pan American Games, Mar del Plata, Argentina (3rd)
- 1998 – Commonwealth Games, Kuala Lumpur, Malaysia (not ranked)
- 1999 – Pan American Games, Winnipeg, Canada (3rd)
- 2001 – Pan American Cup, Kingston, Jamaica (3rd)
- 2001 – World Cup Qualifier, Amiens/Abbeville, France (10th)
