= Kristen Towers =

Australian field hockey player

Personal information
- Born: 12 October 1976 (age 49) Taree, New South Wales

Sport
- Sport: Field hockey
- Position: Midfield
Senior career
Years	Team	Caps	Goals
1998–2001	NSWIS Arrows	44	15
National team
Years	Team	Caps	Goals
1997	Australia U–21	7	(4)
1998–2001	Australia	69	(9)
Medal record
Women's field hockey
Representing Australia
Commonwealth Games
Gold medal – first place	1998 Kuala Lumpur	Team
FIH Champions Trophy
Gold medal – first place	1999 Brisbane	Team
Bronze medal – third place	2001 Amsterdam	Team
Oceania Cup
Gold medal – first place	1999 Australia/New Zealand	Team
Gold medal – first place	2001 New Zealand	Team
FIH Junior World Cup
Silver medal – second place	1997 Seongnam	Team

Kristen Towers (born 12 October 1976) is a retired field hockey player from Australia, who played as a midfielder.

== Personal life ==
Kristen Towers was born and raised in Taree, New South Wales.

Towers has an identical twin sister, Julie, who was also a member of the Hockeyroos.

== Career ==
=== Domestic hockey ===
Throughout her career, Towers was a member of the NSWIS Arrows in the Australian Hockey League.

=== International hockey ===
==== Under–21 ====
In 1997, Towers was a member of the Australia U–21 team at the FIH Junior World Cup in Seongnam. Australia won a silver medal at the tournament, with Towers scoring on four occasions.

==== Hockeyroos ====
Kristen Towers made her official debut for the Hockeyroos in 1998. Later that year she was included in the Commonwealth Games team to compete in Kuala Lumpur. There, she won her first medal with the national team, taking home gold.

1999 proved to be a good year for Towers, winning her second and third gold medals for Australia. Her first was at the FIH Champions Trophy in Brisbane, followed by the Oceania Cup, held across Australia and New Zealand.

After only two appearances in 2000, Towers returned to the international fold in 2001. During the year, she won gold at the Oceania Cup in New Zealand, followed by bronze at the FIH Champions Trophy in Amsterdam.

=== International goals ===
Goal	Date	Location	Opponent	Score	Result	Competition	Ref.
1	14 September 1998	Bukit Jalil Stadium, Kuala Lumpur, Malaysia	Jamaica	2–0	12–0	1998 Commonwealth Games	
2	14 September 1998	Bukit Jalil Stadium, Kuala Lumpur, Malaysia	Jamaica	3–0	12–0	1998 Commonwealth Games	
3	14 September 1998	Bukit Jalil Stadium, Kuala Lumpur, Malaysia	Jamaica	9–0	12–0	1998 Commonwealth Games	
4	14 September 1998	Bukit Jalil Stadium, Kuala Lumpur, Malaysia	Jamaica	11–0	12–0	1998 Commonwealth Games	
5	19 September 1998	Bukit Jalil Stadium, Kuala Lumpur, Malaysia	New Zealand	3–1	7–3	1998 Commonwealth Games	
6	20 September 1998	Bukit Jalil Stadium, Kuala Lumpur, Malaysia	England	6–1	8–1	1998 Commonwealth Games	
7	1 August 1999	Bayer Leverkusen, Leverkusen, Germany	Germany	1–1	1–1	Test Match	
8	23 May 2001	Yanmar Stadium Nagai, Osaka, Japan	Japan	1–0	4–1	2001 East Asian Games	
9	27 May 2001	Yanmar Stadium Nagai, Osaka, Japan	South Korea	6–1	7–1	2001 East Asian Games	
