= Lindsey Carlisle =

South African field hockey player

Personal information
- Born: 22 April 1969 (age 57)
Medal record
Women's field hockey
Representing South Africa
All-Africa Games
Gold medal – first place	2003 Abuja	Team
Afro-Asian Games
Silver medal – second place	2003 Hyderabad	Team
Champions Challenge
Silver medal – second place	2005 Virginia Beach	Team
Africa Cup of Nations
Gold medal – first place	2005 Pretoria

Lindsey Gay Carlisle (born 22 April 1969 in Johannesburg, Gauteng) is a field hockey player from South Africa, who twice represented her native country at the Summer Olympics: 2000 and 2004. The defender comes from Johannesburg, and is nicknamed Linds. She plays for a provincial team called Southern Gauteng.

== International senior tournaments ==
- 1995 – Olympic Qualifier, Cape Town
- 1998 – World Cup, Utrecht
- 1998 – Commonwealth Games, Kuala Lumpur
- 1999 – All Africa Games, Johannesburg
- 2000 – Champions Trophy, Amstelveen
- 2000 – Olympic Games, Sydney
- 2002 – Champions Challenge, Johannesburg
- 2002 – Commonwealth Games, Manchester
- 2002 – World Cup, Perth
- 2003 – All Africa Games, Abuja
- 2003 – Afro-Asian Games, Hyderabad
- 2004 – Olympic Games, Athens
- 2005 – Champions Challenge, Virginia Beach
- 2006 – Commonwealth Games, Melbourne
