= Ann Harada (field hockey) =

Canadian field hockey player

Medal record

Women's Field hockey

Representing Canada

Ann Harada (born 21 March 1977) is a Canadian former field hockey player.

Harada was born in Richmond, British Columbia.
