= 2001 Women's Pan American Cup =

Tournament details
- Host country: Jamaica
- City: Kingston
- Teams: 7 (from 1 confederation)
- Venue: Mona Stadium

Final positions
- Champions: Argentina (1st title)
- Runner-up: United States
- Third place: Canada

Tournament statistics
- Matches played: 24
- Goals scored: 125 (5.21 per match)
- Top scorer: (Argentina) Cecilia Rognoni (14 goals)

The 2001 Women's Pan American Cup was the 1st edition of the Women's Pan American Cup. It was held between 8 and 18 March 2001 in Kingston, Jamaica. The tournament doubled as the qualifier to the 2002 Hockey World Cup to be held in Perth, Australia. The winner would qualify directly while the teams ranked between 2nd and 4th would have the chance to obtain one of six berths at the World Cup Qualifier in Amiens and Abbeville, France.

Argentina won the tournament for the first time after defeating the United States 4–1 in the final, earning an automatic berth at the 2002 Hockey World Cup.

== Format ==
Each of the seven teams plays each other once in a round-robin to complete six preliminary-round games. The top two teams at the end of the preliminary round will play the final, the third and fourth-placed teams play for the bronze medal, while the fifth and sixth-placed teams meet in the fifth-place playoff.

== Umpires ==
Below are the 9 umpires appointed by the Pan American Hockey Federation:

- (Uruguay) Rosario Ardanaz
- (Barbados) Leslie Austin
- (England) Alison Hill
- (Argentina) Soledad Iparraguirre
- (Trinidad and Tobago) Lisa Marcano
- (United States) Deborah Olsen
- (Spain) Mónica Rivera Fraga
- (Mexico) Alicia Takeda Hirata
- (Canada) Ann van Dyk

== Results ==
All times are Eastern Standard Time (UTC−05:00)

=== Preliminary round ===
Pos	Team	Pld	W	D	L	GF	GA	GD	Pts	Qualification
1	Argentina	6	6	0	0	46	2	+44	18	Final
2	United States	6	4	1	1	25	5	+20	13	Final
3	Canada	6	4	1	1	19	7	+12	13	
4	Uruguay	6	3	0	3	10	12	−2	9	
5	Jamaica	6	2	0	4	6	21	−15	6	
6	Mexico	6	1	0	5	6	20	−14	3	
7	Venezuela	6	0	0	6	0	45	−45	0	

Source: PAHF
Rules for classification: 1) points; 2) goal difference; 3) goals scored; 4) head-to-head result.

==== Fixtures ====
8 March 2001
14:00

Uruguay	1–2	Canada
Castagnola 58'	Report	Kopeck 11'; Taunton 48'

Umpires:
Soledad Iparraguirre (ARG)
Alison Hill (ENG)

8 March 2001
16:00

United States	5–0	Mexico
Gannon 5'; Jelley 14', 62'; Welsh 22'; McCann 38'	Report

Umpires:
Ann van Dyk (CAN)
Leslie Austin (BAR)

8 March 2001
19:30

Jamaica	3–0	Venezuela
Cooke 18', 22'; Grant 70'	Report

Umpires:
Rosario Ardanaz (URU)
Mónica Rivera (ESP)

9 March 2001
15:30

Mexico	1–2	Uruguay
I. Hernández 19'	Report	Ceretta 39'; A. Hernández 43'

Umpires:
Lisa Marcano (TTO)
Deborah Olsen (USA)

9 March 2001
17:30

Jamaica	0–5	United States
	Report	Reeve 4'; Jelley 13', 39', 43'; Barber 55'

Umpires:
Alicia Takeda (MEX)
Leslie Austin (BAR)

9 March 2001
19:30

Argentina	14–0	Venezuela
Rognoni 4', 39', 41'; Oneto 19', 31', 32', 42', 54'; Aymar 29'; Gulla 32'; Russo 33'; Masotta 49'; Doreski 63'; García 65'	Report

Umpires:
Alison Hill (ENG)
Ann van Dyk (CAN)

10 March 2001
17:00

Canada	1–5	Argentina
MacNeill 17'	Report	Rognoni 7', 45'; Oneto 17'; Aicega 35'; García 56'

Umpires:
Rosario Ardanaz (URU)
Mónica Rivera (ESP)

11 March 2001
17:00

Venezuela	0–9	Canada
	Report	Grimes 5', 59'; MacNeill 14', 36'; Price 26'; Somerville 43'; MacFarlane 46'; Kopeck 48'; Taunton 60'

Umpires:
Soledad Iparraguirre (ARG)
Deborah Olsen (USA)

11 March 2001
19:00

Jamaica	2–1	Mexico
Allen 28'; Cooke 51'	Report	Zepeda 9'

Umpires:
Ann van Dyk (CAN)
Alison Hill (ENG)

12 March 2001
17:00

Uruguay	0–5	Argentina
	Report	Rognoni 6', 18'; De la Paz Hernández 16'; Oneto 27'; Gulla 55'

Umpires:
Leslie Austin (BAR)
Lisa Marcano (TTO)

12 March 2001
19:00

United States	10–0	Venezuela
Barber 6', 28'; Kauffman 12'; Tagliente 15'; Lingo 30', 55'; Gannon 47'; Meerschwam 55'; McCann 65'; Jelley 68'	Report

Umpires:
Alicia Takeda (MEX)
Rosario Ardanaz (URU)

13 March 2001
15:00

Uruguay	2–1	Jamaica
Ceretta 43'; A. Hernández 56'	Report	Wilson 16'

Umpires:
Mónica Rivera (ESP)
Deborah Olsen (USA)

13 March 2001
17:00

Argentina	4–1	United States
Gulla 22'; Masotta 36'; Aymar 67'; Oneto 70'	Report	Fuchs 44'

Umpires:
Alison Hill (ENG)
Lisa Marcano (TTO)

13 March 2001
19:00

Mexico	0–2	Canada
	Report	MacFarlane 1'; Tingley 42'

Umpires:
Rosario Ardanaz (URU)
Leslie Austin (BAR)

14 March 2001
17:00

Venezuela	0–4	Mexico
	Report	Pérez 19', 44', 51'; García 68'

Umpires:
Ann van Dyk (CAN)
Soledad Iparraguirre (ARG)

15 March 2001
15:00

Venezuela	0–5	Uruguay
	Report	Silva 25', 60'; A. Hernández 29'; Ceretta 33', 41'

Umpires:
Alicia Takeda (MEX)
Mónica Rivera (ESP)

15 March 2001
17:00

Argentina	9–0	Jamaica
Rognoni 4', 9', 30'; García 33'; Oneto 35', 38'; Aicega 47'; Doreski 56'; De la Paz Hernández 65'	Report

Umpires:
Deborah Olsen (USA)
Alison Hill (ENG)

15 March 2001
19:00

Canada	1–1	United States
Johnson 48'	Report	Jelley 62'

Umpires:
Lisa Marcano (TTO)
Rosario Ardanaz (URU)

16 March 2001
15:00

Mexico	0–9	Argentina
	Report	Aymar 3'; Aicega 5'; García 8'; Gulla 25', 37'; Doreski 29'; Rognoni 52', 62'; Russo 65'

Umpires:
Mónica Rivera (ESP)
Deborah Olsen (USA)

16 March 2001
17:00

Canada	4–0	Jamaica
Somerville 25'; MacNeill 53'; Price 67'; Bowyer 69'	Report

Umpires:
Lisa Marcano (TTO)
Alicia Takeda (MEX)

16 March 2001
19:00

United States	3–0	Uruguay
McCann 16'; Lingo 25', 53'	Report

Umpires:
Leslie Austin (BAR)
Soledad Iparraguirre (ARG)

=== Classification round ===
==== Fifth and sixth place ====
18 March 2001
12:30

Jamaica	2–0	Mexico
S. Russell 19'; C. Russell 66'	Report

Umpires:
Ann van Dyk (CAN)
Rosario Ardanaz (URU)

==== Third and fourth place ====
18 March 2001
15:00

Canada	6–0	Uruguay
Taunton 26'; Grimes 52', 56', 68'; Price 66'; Bowyer 70'	Report

Umpires:
Mónica Rivera (ESP)
Soledad Iparraguirre (ARG)

==== Final ====
18 March 2001
17:30

Argentina	4–1	United States
Rognoni 12'; Aymar 24', 56'; Masotta 36'	Report	Gannon 38'

Umpires:
Lisa Marcano (TTO)
Alison Hill (ENG)

== Statistics ==
=== Final standings ===
Pos	Team	Pld	W	D	L	GF	GA	GD	Pts	Qualification
1st place, gold medalist(s)	Argentina	7	7	0	0	50	3	+47	21	Qualified to 2002 FIH World Cup
2nd place, silver medalist(s)	United States	7	4	1	2	26	9	+17	13	
3rd place, bronze medalist(s)	Canada	7	5	1	1	25	7	+18	16	
4	Uruguay	7	3	0	4	10	18	−8	9	
5	Jamaica	7	3	0	4	8	21	−13	9	
6	Mexico	7	1	0	6	6	22	−16	3	
7	Venezuela	6	0	0	6	0	45	−45	0	

Source: PAHF

=== Goalscorers ===
There were 125 goals scored in 24 matches, for an average of 5.21 goals per match.

13 goals

- (Argentina) Cecilia Rognoni

10 goals

- (Argentina) Vanina Oneto

7 goals

- (United States) Tara Jelley

5 goals

- (Argentina) Luciana Aymar
- (Argentina) Alejandra Gulla
- (Canada) Aoibhinn Grimes

4 goals

- (Argentina) Soledad García
- (Canada) Karen MacNeill
- (United States) Carrie Lingo
- (Uruguay) Bettiana Ceretta

3 goals

- (Argentina) Magdalena Aicega
- (Argentina) Natalí Doreski
- (Argentina) Karina Masotta
- (Canada) Rebecca Price
- (Canada) Kristen Taunton
- (Jamaica) Natasha Cooke
- (Mexico) Mayra Pérez
- (United States) Kate Barber
- (United States) Kelli Gannon
- (United States) Kristen McCann
- (Uruguay) Ana Hernández

2 goals

- (Argentina) María de la Paz Hernández
- (Argentina) Mariné Russo
- (Canada) Michelle Bowyer
- (Canada) Laurelee Kopeck
- (Canada) Amy MacFarlane
- (Canada) Carla Somerville
- (Uruguay) Virginia Silva

1 goal

- (Canada) Jennifer Johnson
- (Canada) Sue Tingley
- (Jamaica) Andrea Allen
- (Jamaica) Nicole Grant
- (Jamaica) Chantel Russell
- (Jamaica) Sharee Russell
- (Jamaica) Kadene Wilson
- (Mexico) Carmen García
- (Mexico) Isabelle Hernández
- (Mexico) Yessica Zepeda
- (United States) Tracey Fuchs
- (United States) Katherine Kauffman
- (United States) Melanie Meerschwam
- (United States) Jill Reeve
- (United States) Carla Tagliente
- (United States) Autumn Welsh
- (Uruguay) Florenica Castagnola
