= Robyn Toomey =

New Zealand field hockey player

Personal information
- Born: 6 March 1964 (age 62) Napier, New Zealand
Medal record
Women's field hockey
Representing New Zealand
Commonwealth Games
Bronze medal – third place	1998 Kuala Lumpur	Team

Robyn Michelle Toomey-Matthews (born 6 March 1964 in Napier) is a former field hockey player from New Zealand, who finished in eight position with the National Women's Field Hockey Team, nicknamed The Black Sticks, at the 1992 Summer Olympics in Barcelona. She was also a member of the squad that won the bronze medal at the 1998 Commonwealth Games in Kuala Lumpur.
