= Peter Martin Associates =

Peter Martin Associates was a book publisher in Canada, founded by Peter and Carol Martin in 1965, which operated until the early 1980s. It published significant works in the field of Canadian politics, art, and culture, and specialized in children's books, young adult fiction, and textbooks for the college education market. It also published the Canadian Reader, a monthly review of new books by Canadian publishers.

The sale and distribution of its books was overseen by the University of Toronto Press.

Authors included:

- Janet Lunn,
- Fredelle Maynard,
- David Lewis Stein,
- Robert Fulford,
- Donald Cameron, and
- Joyce Wieland.

In 1982, the firm was sold to The Book Society of Canada, owned by Irwin Publishing. In 1988, the records, art work and photographs relating to Peter Martin Associates were transferred to McMaster University in Hamilton, Ontario.
