= Sue Tingley =

Canadian field hockey player

Sue Tingley (born April 18, 1977 in Saint John, New Brunswick) is a field hockey player from Canada, who earned more than hundred international caps for the Canadian Women's National Team during her career. On national level the midfielder, a resident of Upper Cape, New Brunswick, played for the University of Alberta Pandas Team (1995-1999). She was named Most Valuable Player at the 1997 Junior World Cup Qualifier in Santiago, Chile, where Canada finished in second place. In 2002 Tingley moved to the Netherlands to play for Push in the Dutch top league, named Hoofdklasse.

== International senior tournaments ==
- 1997 – World Cup Qualifier, Harare, Zimbabwe (11th)
- 1998 – Commonwealth Games, Kuala Lumpur, Malaysia (not ranked)
- 1999 – Pan American Games, Winnipeg, Canada (3rd)
- 2001 – Pan American Cup, Kingston, Jamaica (3rd)
- 2001 – World Cup Qualifier, Amiens/Abbeville, France (10th)
- 2002 – Commonwealth Games, Manchester, England (7th)
