= Julia Wong (field hockey) =

Canadian field hockey player

Julia Wong (born 25 July 1975) is a Canadian former field hockey player.
