= Hilary Rose (field hockey) =

British field hockey player

Personal information
- Nationality: English
- Born: 9 July 1971 (age 54) Sale, Cheshire, England

Sport
- Sport: Field Hockey
Medal record
Women's field hockey
Representing England
Champions Challenge
Gold medal – first place	2002 Johannesburg	Team
Commonwealth Games
Silver medal – second place	1998 Kuala Lumpur	Team
Silver medal – second place	2002 Manchester	Team
European Championship
Bronze medal – third place	1999 Cologne	Team

Hilary Mary Rose (born 9 July 1971 in Sale, Cheshire, England) is a female British field hockey goalkeeper.

== Hockey career ==
Rose plays for Ipswich and England and has played for Great Britain and represented England from 1993 to 2002. She represented England and won a silver medal, at the 1998 Commonwealth Games in Kuala Lumpur. Four years later she won another silver medal at the 2002 Commonwealth Games.

== Personal life ==
She is a qualified Diagnostic Radiographer having studied at Canterbury Christ Church University.
