= Jenny Shepherd =

New Zealand field hockey player

Personal information
- Born: 12 April 1972 (age 54)
Medal record
Women's Field Hockey
Representing New Zealand
Commonwealth Games
Bronze medal – third place	1998 Kuala Lumpur	Team

Jenny Ellen Shepherd (born 12 April 1972 in Whangarei, New Zealand) is a retired female field hockey player from New Zealand. She was a member of the Women's National Team, nicknamed The Black Sticks, that won the bronze medal at the 1998 Commonwealth Games in Kuala Lumpur, Malaysia.
