= Hockey at the 1998 Commonwealth Games – Women's tournament =

1998 Commonwealth Games – Women's hockey
Tournament details
- Host country: Malaysia
- City: Kuala Lumpur
- Teams: 12

Final positions
- Champions: Australia (1st title)
- Runner-up: England
- Third place: New Zealand

Tournament statistics
- Matches played: 34
- Goals scored: 192 (5.65 per match)
- Top scorer: (Australia) Alyson Annan (11 goals)

The first edition of the Women's Hockey Tournament at the Commonwealth Games took place at the Bukit Jalil Stadium, during the 1998 Commonwealth Games in Kuala Lumpur, Malaysia. The event started on Wednesday September 9 and ended on Sunday September 20.

== Participating nations ==
Pool A	Pool B
Australia; India; Jamaica; Malaysia; Scotland; Trinidad and Tobago	Canada; England; Namibia; New Zealand; South Africa; Wales

== Results ==
All times local (UTC +8).

=== Preliminary round ===
==== Pool A ====
Pos	Team	Pld	W	D	L	GF	GA	GD	Pts	Qualification
1	Australia	5	5	0	0	41	0	+41	15	Semi-finals
2	India	5	3	1	1	19	8	+11	10	Semi-finals
3	Scotland	5	3	1	1	11	11	0	10	
4	Malaysia	5	2	0	3	11	21	−10	6	
5	Trinidad and Tobago	5	1	0	4	5	23	−18	3	
6	Jamaica	5	0	0	5	2	26	−24	0	

Source: FIH
Rules for classification: 1) points; 2) goal difference; 3) goals scored; 4) head-to-head result.

9 September 1998
18:05

Australia	6–0	Scotland
Annan 31', 69'; Powell 34'; Andrews 39'; Peek 44'; Mitchell-Taverner 60'	Report

10 September 1998
16:05

Trinidad and Tobago	1–6	Malaysia

10 September 1998
20:35

India	4–0	Jamaica
Pritam 14', 19', 30'; Sandeep 64'	Report

12 September 1998
16:05

Scotland	5–1	Jamaica

12 September 1998
19:35

Malaysia	0–11	Australia
	Report	Hawkes 12', 70'; Dobson 23'; Andrews 28', 33'; Langham 31'; Annan 39', 54', 60'; Starre 57'; Powell 64'

12 September 1998
20:35

India	7–1	Trinidad and Tobago

14 September 1998
16:05

Malaysia	1–6	India
Melati 41'	Report	Pritam 2', 14'; Kamala 6', 65'; Sandeep 13'; Sita 61'

14 September 1998
18:05

Scotland	2–1	Trinidad and Tobago

14 September 1998
20:05

Jamaica	0–12	Australia
	Report	Haslam 2'; Towers 4', 8', 43', 51'; Powell 10'; Mitchell-Taverner 12', 34'; Andrews 23', 66'; Annan 33'; Langham 49'

15 September 1998
19:35

Trinidad and Tobago	2–0	Jamaica

15 September 1998
20:35

Malaysia	1–2	Scotland

16 September 1998
18:05

Australia	4–0	India
Andrews 10', 62'; Powell 12', 22'	Report

17 September 1998
16:05

Australia	8–0	Trinidad and Tobago
Dobson 10'; Andrews 24', 61'; Powell 29', 56', 69'; Annan 34'; Langham 37'	Report

17 September 1998
18:05

Jamaica	1–3	Malaysia

17 September 1998
19:35

Scotland	2–2	India
Simpson 29', 41'	Report	Sita 23'; Nidhi 66'

==== Pool B ====
Pos	Team	Pld	W	D	L	GF	GA	GD	Pts	Qualification
1	England	5	4	1	0	18	2	+16	13	Semi-finals
2	New Zealand	5	4	0	1	26	5	+21	12	Semi-finals
3	South Africa	5	3	1	1	21	5	+16	10	
4	Canada	5	1	1	3	7	9	−2	4	
5	Wales	5	1	1	3	6	17	−11	4	
6	Namibia	5	0	0	5	1	41	−40	0	

Source: FIH
Rules for classification: 1) points; 2) goal difference; 3) goals scored; 4) head-to-head result.

9 September 1998
16:05

Wales	0–4	South Africa

9 September 1998
19:35

England	1–0	New Zealand

9 September 1998
19:35

Canada	3–0	Namibia
Somerville 8'; MacNeill 26'; Grimes 40'	Report

10 September 1998
18:05

New Zealand	15–1	Namibia

10 September 1998
19:35

Canada	2–2	Wales
Taunton 19'; Somerville 50'	Report	10', 60'

12 September 1998
18:05

South Africa	1–1	England

13 September 1998
16:05

Namibia	0–8	England

13 September 1998
18:05

South Africa	3–0	Canada
18', 21', 32'	Report

13 September 1998
20:05

Wales	1–5	New Zealand

15 September 1998
16:05

England	2–1	Canada
Nicholson 48', 66'	Report	Grimes 59'

15 September 1998
18:05

Namibia	0–3	Wales

16 September 1998
16:05

New Zealand	2–1	Canada
35', 40'	Report	Kopeck 22'

16 September 1998
19:35

South Africa	12–0	Namibia

16 September 1998
20:35

England	6–0	Wales

17 September 1998
20:35

New Zealand	4–1	South Africa

=== Classification round ===
Semi-finals
19 September 1998
Australia	7
New Zealand	3
19 September 1998
England	2
India	0

Final
20 September 1998
Australia	8
England	1
Third Place
20 September 1998
New Zealand	3
India	0

==== Semi-finals ====
19 September 1998
15:05

Australia	7–3	New Zealand
Annan 13', 15', 38'; Towers 32'; Dobson 44', 64'; Mott 65'	Report

19 September 1998
16:45

England	2–0	India

==== Bronze-medal match ====
20 September 1998
15:05

New Zealand	3–0	India
Lawrence 42'; Bell-Kake 46'; Walton 50'	Report

==== Gold-medal match ====
20 September 1998
16:45

Australia	8–1	England
Powell 18'; Mott 20', 37'; Hawkes 29'; Annan 59'; Towers 59'; Andrews 67'; Haslam 69'	Report	Clewlow 64'

== Statistics ==
=== Final standings ===
As per statistical convention in field hockey, matches decided in extra time are counted as wins and losses, while matches decided by penalty shoot-outs are counted as draws.

Pos	Grp	Team	Pld	W	D	L	GF	GA	GD	Pts	Final result
1st place, gold medalist(s)	A	Australia	7	7	0	0	56	4	+52	21	Gold Medal
2nd place, silver medalist(s)	B	England	7	5	1	1	21	10	+11	16	Silver Medal
3rd place, bronze medalist(s)	B	New Zealand	7	5	0	2	32	12	+20	15	Bronze Medal
4	A	India	7	3	1	3	19	13	+6	10	Fourth place
5	B	South Africa	5	3	1	1	21	5	+16	10	Eliminated in group stage
6	A	Scotland	5	3	1	1	11	11	0	10	Eliminated in group stage
7	A	Malaysia	5	2	0	3	11	21	−10	6	Eliminated in group stage
8	B	Canada	5	1	1	3	7	9	−2	4	Eliminated in group stage
9	B	Wales	5	1	1	3	6	17	−11	4	Eliminated in group stage
10	A	Trinidad and Tobago	5	1	0	4	5	23	−18	3	Eliminated in group stage
11	A	Jamaica	5	0	0	5	2	26	−24	0	Eliminated in group stage
12	B	Namibia	5	0	0	5	1	41	−40	0	Eliminated in group stage

Source: FIH
