= Laurelee Kopeck =

Canadian field hockey player

Personal information
- Born: July 17, 1969 Nelson, British Columbia
- Height: 160 cm (5 ft 3 in)
- Weight: 48 kg (106 lb)
Medal record
Field hockey
Pan American Games
Bronze medal – third place	1999 Pan American Games	Women's team

Laurelee Kopeck (born July 17, 1969 in Nelson, British Columbia) is a former field hockey defender from Canada, who earned a total number of 163 international caps for the Canadian National Team during her career. Nicknamed "Jumbo", she graduated from the University of Victoria (sociology/psychology) in 1996. Kopeck also played club hockey in Hamburg, Germany.

== International senior tournaments ==
- 1989 – Champions Trophy, Frankfurt, West Germany (6th)
- 1990 – World Cup, Sydney, Australia (10th)
- 1991 – Olympic Qualifier, Auckland, New Zealand (3rd)
- 1991 – Pan American Games, Havana, Cuba (2nd)
- 1992 – Summer Olympics, Barcelona, Spain (7th)
- 1993 – World Cup Qualifier, Philadelphia, United States (3rd)
- 1993 – World Student Games, Buffalo, USA
- 1994 – World Cup, Dublin, Ireland (10th)
- 1995 – Olympic Qualifier, Cape Town, South Africa (7th)
- 1997 – World Cup Qualifier, Harare, Zimbabwe (11th)
- 1998 – Commonwealth Games, Kuala Lumpur, Malaysia (not ranked)
- 1999 – Pan American Games, Winnipeg, Canada (3rd)
- 2001 – Pan American Cup, Kingston, Jamaica (3rd)
- 2001 – World Cup Qualifier, Amiens/Abbeville, France (10th)
