= Amy MacFarlane =

Canadian field hockey player

Amy MacFarlane (born November 4, 1974, in Montreal, Quebec) is a former field hockey forward, who earned a total number of 109 international caps for the Canadian National Team during her career. Collegiately, she played for Princeton University where she earned All-Ivy honors.

== International senior tournaments ==
- 1995 – Pan American Games, Mar del Plata, Argentina (3rd)
- 1995 – Olympic Qualifier, Cape Town, South Africa (7th)
- 1997 – World Cup Qualifier, Harare, Zimbabwe (11th)
- 1998 – Commonwealth Games, Kuala Lumpur, Malaysia (not ranked)
- 1999 – Pan American Games, Winnipeg, Manitoba, Canada (3rd)
- 2001 – Pan American Cup, Kingston, Jamaica (3rd)
- 2001 – World Cup Qualifier, Amiens/Abbeville, France (10th)
