= Lisa Faust =

Canadian field hockey player and coach

Lisa Faust (born November 9, 1966, in Vancouver, British Columbia) is a former field hockey player from Canada, who earned a total number of 118 international caps for the Canadian Women's National Team during her career. On national level the midfielder played for Vancouver Hawks.

Later on in her hockey career Faust became head coach of Simon Fraser University Women's Field Hockey Team.

== International senior tournaments ==
- 1995 – Pan American Games, Mar del Plata, Argentina (3rd)
- 1995 – Olympic Qualifier, Cape Town, South Africa (7th)
- 1997 – World Cup Qualifier, Harare, Zimbabwe (11th)
- 1998 – Commonwealth Games, Kuala Lumpur, Malaysia (not ranked)
- 1999 – Pan American Games, Winnipeg, Manitoba, Canada (3rd)
- 2001 – Americas Cup, Kingston, Jamaica (3rd)
- 2001 – World Cup Qualifier, Amiens/Abbeville, France (10th)
- 2002 – Commonwealth Games, Manchester, England (7th)
