= Tina Cullen =

British field hockey player

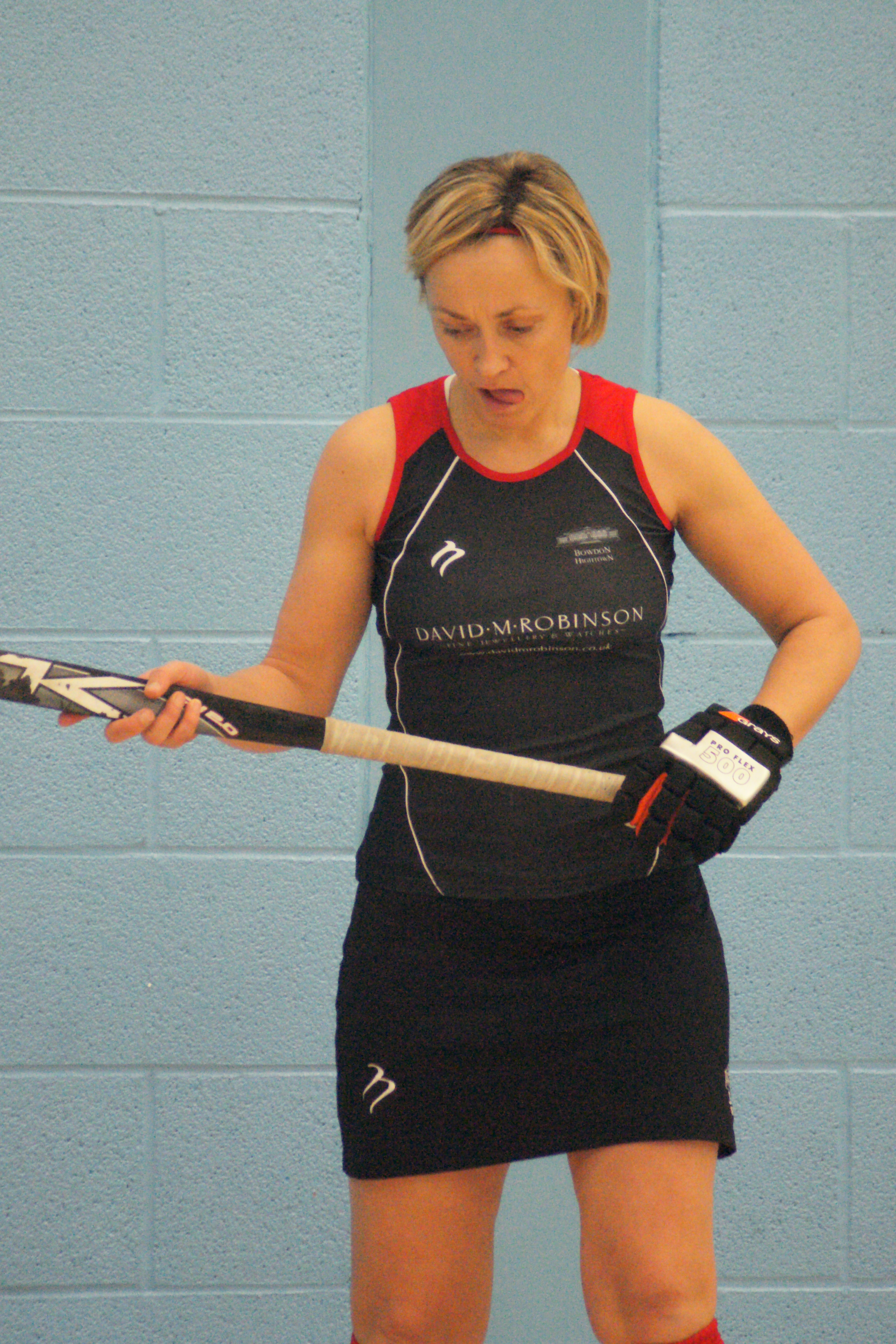

Personal information
- Born: 1 March 1970 (age 56)
Medal record
Women's field hockey
Representing England
European Championship
Bronze medal – third place	1999 Cologne	Team
Commonwealth Games
Silver medal – second place	1998 Kuala Lumpur	Team

Christina Louise "Tina" Cullen MBE (born 1 March 1970 in Stockport, Cheshire) is a field hockey player from England.

Cullen has represented Great Britain in two consecutive Summer Olympics, starting in 1996 when the team finished in fourth place.

She was a coach with Bowdon Hightown and has over 400 English Premier League goals to her name. She teaches sport at Greenbank High School and was awarded an MBE in the New Years honours list 2013.
