= Denise Marston-Smith =

British field hockey player

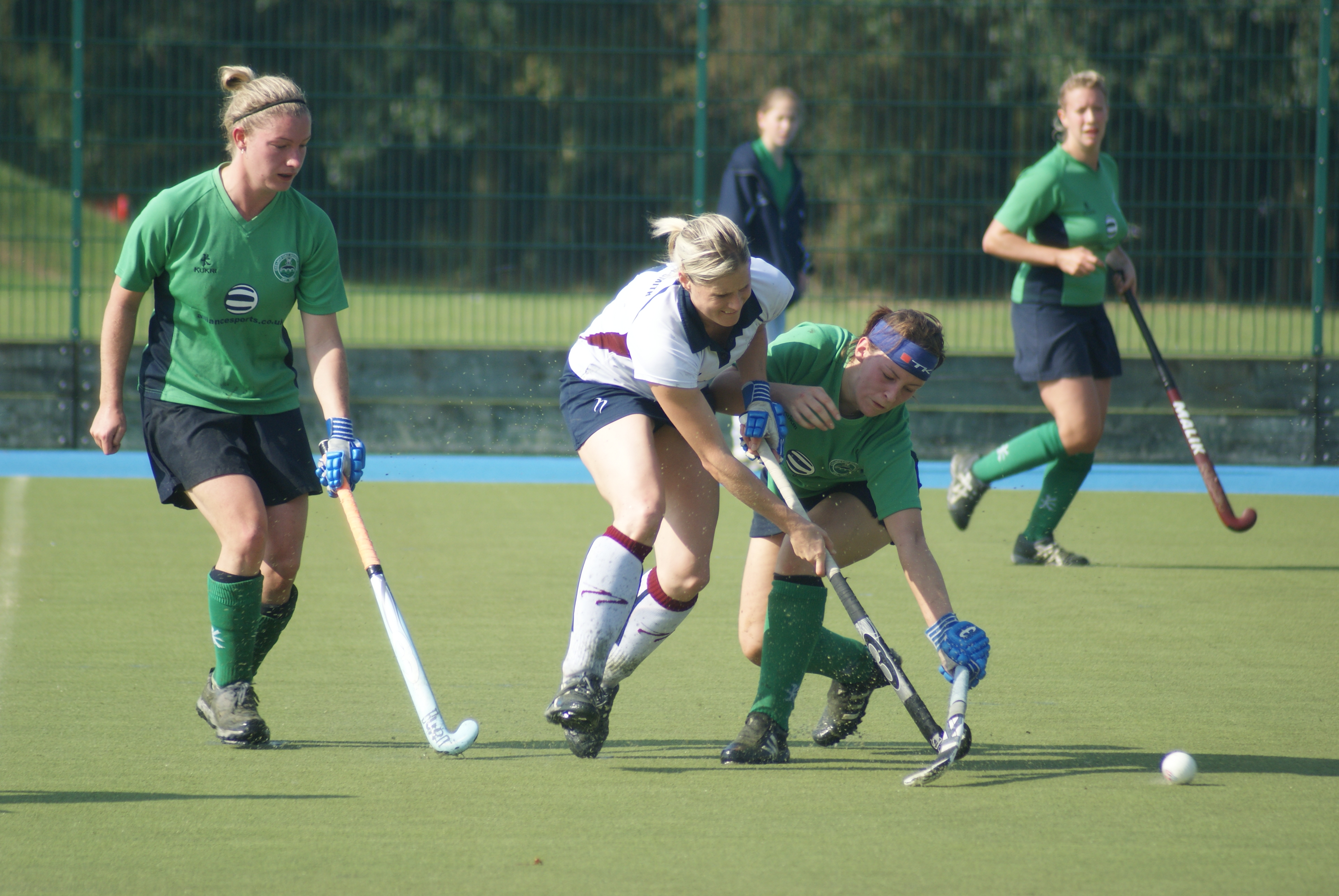
- Denise Marston-Smith (in white)

Personal information
- Nationality: English
- Born: 23 May 1977 (age 49) Bristol, South West England

Sport
- Sport: Field Hockey
- Club: Olton & West Warwickshire
Medal record
Women's field hockey
Representing England
Champions Challenge
Gold medal – first place	2002 Johannesburg	Team
Commonwealth Games
Silver medal – second place	1998 Kuala Lumpur	Team

Denise Marston-Smith (born 1977) is a female former English field hockey international, who was a member of the England and Great Britain women's field hockey team. She represented England and won a silver medal, at the 1998 Commonwealth Games in Kuala Lumpur. As of 2007 she played for Olton & West Warwickshire Hockey Club.
