= Sue Armstrong =

Canadian field hockey player

Sue (Susan) Armstrong (born December 14, 1973, in Lloydminster, Saskatchewan) is a former field hockey player from Canada, who earned 51 caps for the Women's Senior National Team during her career.

On the national level Armstrong, who was a resident of Edmonton, Alberta, played for Edmonton Women's FHA and the University of Alberta Pandas.

== International senior tournaments ==
- 1997 – World Cup Qualifier, Harare, Zimbabwe (11th)
- 1998 – Commonwealth Games, Kuala Lumpur, Malaysia (not ranked)
- 1999 – Pan American Games, Winnipeg, Manitoba, Canada (3rd)
