= 1993 Women's Intercontinental Cup =

Field hockey tournament

The 1993 Women's Intercontinental Cup was a qualifier for the 1994 Women's Hockey World Cup and was held in Philadelphia, Pennsylvania, from July 15 until July 25, 1993. Twelve nations took part, and they were divided into two groups of six in the preliminary round. The top five teams will join the other six that have already qualified: Australia, China, England, hosts Ireland, the Netherlands, Olympic champions Spain, and South Korea.

== Final standings ==
1. Germany*
2. Argentina*
3. Canada*
4. Russia*
5. United States*
6. India
7. Scotland
8. New Zealand
9. Japan
10. Belgium
11. Italy
12. France

== Remarks ==
- The first five (Germany, Argentina, Canada, Russia and the United States) participated in the 1994 Women's Hockey World Cup in Dublin, Ireland.
