= Magdalena Aicega =

Argentine field hockey player

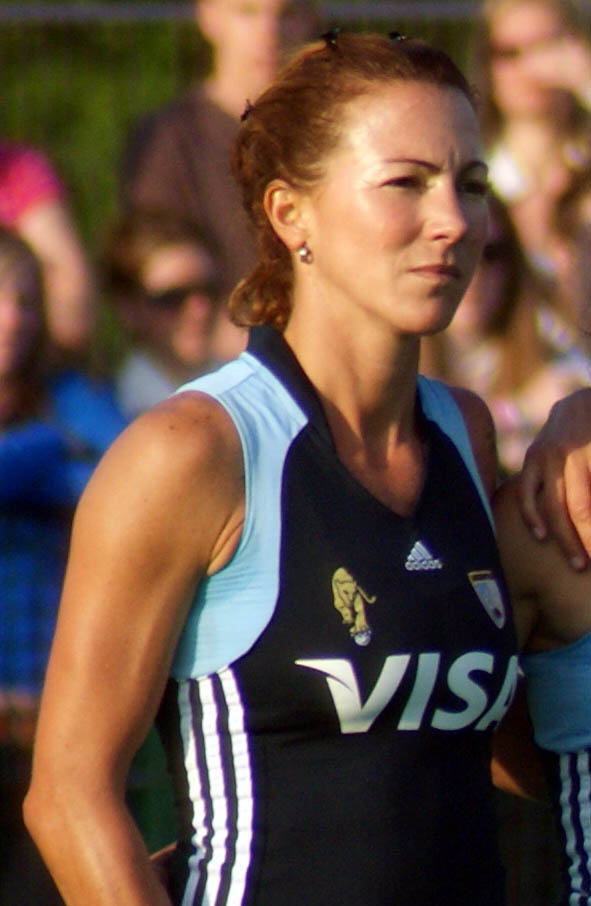
- Aicega in 2008

Personal information
- Full name: María Magdalena Aicega
- Born: 1 November 1973 (age 52) Buenos Aires, Argentina

Sport
- Sport: Field hockey
- Position: Defender
Senior career
Years	Team	Caps	Goals
1987–2019	Belgrano A.C.	-	-
2023	Belgrano A.C.	-	-
National team
Years	Team	Caps	Goals
1993–2008	Argentina		-
Coaching career
- 2019–23: Belgrano A.C.

Magdalena Aicega
Medal record

Women's field hockey

Representing Argentina

Olympic Games
Silver medal – second place	2000 Sydney	Team
Bronze medal – third place	2004 Athens	Team
Bronze medal – third place	2008 Beijing	Team

World Cup
Gold medal – first place	2002 Perth	Team
Silver medal – second place	1994 Dublin	Team
Bronze medal – third place	2006 Madrid	Team

Champions Trophy
Gold medal – first place	2001 Amstelveen	Team
Gold medal – first place	2008 Mönchengladbach	Team
Silver medal – second place	2002 Macau	Team
Silver medal – second place	2007 Quilmes	Team
Bronze medal – third place	2004 Rosario	Team

Pan American Games
Gold medal – first place	1995 Mar del Plata	Team
Gold medal – first place	1999 Winnipeg	Team
Gold medal – first place	2003 Santo Domingo	Team
Gold medal – first place	2007 Rio de Janeiro	Team

Pan American Cup
Gold medal – first place	2001 Kingston	Team

María Magdalena Aicega Amicarelli (born 1 November 1973) is an Argentine retired field hockey, who won the silver medal at the 2000 Summer Olympics in Sydney, Australia and the bronze medal at the 2004 Summer Olympics in Athens, Greece and at the 2008 Summer Olympics in Beijing, China with the Argentina national team.

Aicega, who played as a central defender, is regarded as one of the most notable players in the history of Las Leonas, for whom she played for more than 15 years.

== Overview ==
Aicega started her career in Belgrano Athletic at 7 years old, and debuting with the senior squad seven years later. At 16, Aicega played her first match for the Argentina national team.

Aicega won the 2002 World Cup, two Champions Trophy, four gold medals at the Pan American Games and the Pan American Cup in 2001. Nicknamed Magui, she first represented her native country at the Junior World Cup in 1993 in Barcelona, Spain, where Argentina won the gold. The following year the penalty corner hitter played for the senior team, finishing second at the World Cup in Dublin, Ireland. Aicega retired from the national team in 2008.

Aicega was awarded with the Silver Olimpia Award, the most prestigious local prize awarded by Argentina's Sports Journalists Association, in 1998 and 2003. She was also nominated for the FIH's Best Player of the Year in 1999, won by Australia's Alyson Annan. Aicega was also awarded with the Premio Konex of Argentina in 2000.

After 33 years playing for Belgrano, in 2019 Aicega retired from hockey. She later became coach of the Belgrano's youth divisions. Nevertheless, in August 2023, Aicega (who was 49 years old by then) announced she would return to play for Belgrano Athletic the "Torneo Reubicación", a promotion and relegation tournament. Belgrano was finally relegated to the second division along with San Martín.

== Other work ==
After her retirement from hockey, Aicega (who has a degree in nutrition) has worked as a sports commentator (covering hockey and then football matches for TNT Argentina). She had also a brief tenure as director of ENARD (acronym of "Ente Nacional de Alto Rendimiento Deportivo") in 2017.
