= Pauline Robertson =

British field hockey player

Pauline Judith Robertson-Stott (born 28 December 1968) is a retired female field hockey player from Scotland. She represented Great Britain in two consecutive Summer Olympics, starting in 1996 when she captained the team that ended up in fourth place.
