= Michele MacNaughton =

South African field hockey player

Michele MacNaughton (born 18 November 1973 in Durban, KwaZulu-Natal) is a retired female field hockey player from South Africa, who represented her native country at the 2000 Summer Olympics in Sydney, Australia. There she was a member of the women's national team that finished in tenth place.
