= Alison Dare =

South African field hockey player

Alison Dare (born 5 December 1965) is a South African former field hockey player who competed in the 2000 Summer Olympics.
