= Kristen Taunton =

Canadian field hockey player

Kristen Taunton (born June 27, 1977 in Richmond, British Columbia) is a former field hockey forward from Canada, who earned a total number of 118 international caps for the Canadian Women's National Team during her career.

She won a bronze medal, at the 1999 Pan American Games.

== International senior tournaments ==
- 1998 – Commonwealth Games, Kuala Lumpur, Malaysia (not ranked)
- 1999 – Pan American Games, Winnipeg, Canada (3rd)
- 2001 – Pan American Cup, Kingston, Jamaica (3rd)
- 2001 – World Cup Qualifier, Amiens/Abbeville, France (10th)
- 2002 – Commonwealth Games, Manchester, England (7th)
