= Karen MacNeill =

Canadian field hockey player

Medal record

Women's Field hockey

Representing Canada

Karen MacNeill (born January 7, 1972, in Calgary, Alberta) is a former field hockey striker from Canada, who earned a total number of 105 international caps for the Canadian Women's National Team during her career. She won a bronze medal, at the 1999 Pan American Games.

She played club hockey on national level for Phoenix Calgary, and earned a Masters of arts degree in sport psychology at the University of Ottawa and a Masters of science degree in counselling psychology from the University of Calgary. MacNeill also played in the Dutch League, in the 1998-1999 season, for Amsterdam. She is a Ph.D candidate at the University of British Columbia, and is working as a sport psychologist with Olympic and domestic level athletes.

== International senior tournaments ==
- 1995 – Pan American Games, Mar del Plata, Argentina (3rd)
- 1995 – Olympic Qualifier, Cape Town, South Africa (7th)
- 1997 – World Cup Qualifier, Harare, Zimbabwe (11th)
- 1998 – Commonwealth Games, Kuala Lumpur, Malaysia (not ranked)
- 1999 – Pan American Games, Winnipeg, Canada (3rd)
- 2001 – Pan American Cup, Kingston, Jamaica (3rd)
- 2001 – World Cup Qualifier, Amiens/Abbeville, France (10th)
