= Mandy Nicholson =

British field hockey player

Personal information
- Born: 28 February 1968 (age 58) Kingston-upon-Thames

Sport
- Sport: Field hockey
Medal record
Women's field hockey
Representing Great Britain
Olympic Games
| Bronze medal – third place | 1992 Barcelona | Team |
Representing England
Commonwealth Games
| Silver medal – second place | 1998 Kuala Lumpur | Team |
| Silver medal – second place | 2002 Manchester | Team |

Mandy Nicholson (née Nicholls; born 28 February 1968) is a field hockey player, who was a member of the British squad that won the bronze medal at the 1992 Summer Olympics in Barcelona. She competed in three consecutive Summer Olympics, starting in 1992. She represented England and won a silver medal, at the 1998 Commonwealth Games in Kuala Lumpur. Four years later she won another silver medal at the 2002 Commonwealth Games.
