= Aoibhinn Grimes =

Canadian field hockey player

Aoibhinn Grimes (born August 30, 1976, in Kelowna, British Columbia) is a former field hockey forward from Canada, who earned a total number of hundred international caps for the Canadian Women's National Team during her career. On national level she played for University of Victoria Vikes. Grimes earned a degree in kinesiology from the University of Victoria.

== International senior tournaments ==
- 1997 – World Cup Qualifier, Harare, Zimbabwe (11th)
- 1998 – Commonwealth Games, Kuala Lumpur, Malaysia (not ranked)
- 1999 – Pan American Games, Winnipeg, Canada (3rd)
- 2001 – Pan American Cup, Kingston, Jamaica (3rd)
- 2001 – World Cup Qualifier, Amiens/Abbeville, France (10th)
- 2002 – Commonwealth Games, Manchester, England (7th)
