= Chris Hunter (field hockey) =

Canadian field hockey player

Chris Hunter (born November 27, 1972, in Winnipeg, Manitoba) is a former field hockey forward from Canada, who earned a total number of 69 international caps for the Women's National Team during her career in the 1990s. She started playing hockey in high school (Grant Park H.S.) in Winnipeg. Hunter studied Occupational Therapy at the University of Alberta.
