= Carla Somerville =

Canadian field hockey player and coach

Carla Somerville (born November 30, 1973, in Calgary, Alberta) is a former field hockey player from Canada, who earned a total number of 97 international caps for the Women's Senior National Team during her career. On national level Somerville, a resident of Edmonton, Alberta, played for Edmonton Women's FHA.

Currently, she is the head coach of the University of Alberta Pandas field hockey team, and is the reigning Canadian Interuniversity Sport Coach of the Year after guiding the Pandas to their first-ever CIS championship in 2005.

== International senior tournaments ==
- 1995 – Pan American Games, Mar del Plata, Argentina (3rd)
- 1995 – Olympic Qualifier, Cape Town, South Africa (7th)
- 1997 – World Cup Qualifier, Harare, Zimbabwe (11th)
- 1998 – Commonwealth Games, Kuala Lumpur, Malaysia (not ranked)
- 1999 – Pan American Games, Winnipeg, Canada (3rd)
- 2001 – Pan American Cup, Kingston, Jamaica (3rd)
- 2001 – World Cup Qualifier, Amiens/Abbeville, France (10th)
