= 1998 Women's Hockey World Cup squads =

This article lists the confirmed squads for the 1998 Women's Hockey World Cup held in Utrecht, Netherlands from May 20 and May 31, 1998.

== Pool A ==
=== Australia ===
- Head Coach: Ric Charlesworth
1. Kate Starre
2. Julie Towers
3. Katrina Powell
4. Nikki Mott
5. Claire Mitchell-Taverner
6. Alison Peek
7. Karen Smith
8. Katie Allen
9. Lisa Powell
10. Juliet Haslam
11. Bianca Langham
12. Alyson Annan
13. Renita Garard
14. Rechelle Hawkes (c)
15. Clover Maitland (GK)
16. Justine Sowry (GK)

=== China ===
- Head Coach: Wang Qingsen
1. Nie Yali (GK)
2. Chen Hong
3. Chen Zhaoxia
4. Cai Xuemei
5. Wu Jing
6. Liu Lijie
7. Fu Baorong
8. Huang Junxia
9. Cheng Hui (c)
10. Zhang Anjie
11. Li Congrong
12. Bai Jinli
13. Juan Li
14. Tang Chunling
15. Wang Jiuyan
16. Zhou Shujie (GK)

=== Germany ===
- Head Coach: Berthi Rauth
1. Julia Zwehl (GK)
2. Louisa Walter (GK)
3. Denise Klecker
4. Tanja Dickenscheid
5. Nadine Ernsting-Krienke
6. Inga Möller
7. Natascha Keller
8. Melanie Cremer
9. Friederike Barth
10. Wibke Weisel
11. Cornelia Reiter
12. Britta Becker
13. Marion Rodewald
14. Philippa Suxdorf
15. Heike Lätzsch
16. Katrin Kauschke (c)

=== Scotland ===
- Head Coach: Mike Gilbert
1. Sue Lawrie (GK)
2. Tracy Robb (GK)
3. Alison Denholm
4. Helen Walker
5. Fiona Pearson
6. Janet Jack
7. Susan Fraser
8. Carrie Corcoran
9. Sue MacDonald
10. Rhona Simpson
11. Alison Grant
12. Louise Burton
13. Pauline Robertson (c)
14. Diane Renilson
15. Valerie Neil
16. Susan Gilmour

=== South Africa ===
- Head Coach: (Netherlands) Boudewijn Castelijn
1. Nicky du Toit (GK)
2. Inke van Wyk (GK)
3. Sharon Cormack
4. Jacqui Geyser
5. Carina van Zyl
6. Marilyn Agliotti
7. El-may Brink
8. Megan Dobson
9. Michele MacNaughton
10. Hanneli Arnoldi
11. Karen Roberts (c)
12. Lindsey Carlisle
13. Susan Wessels
14. Kerry Bee
15. Pietie Coetzee
16. Alison Dare

=== United States ===
- Head Coach: Pam Hixon
1. Michelle Vizzuso
2. Kate Barber
3. Kristy Gleason
4. Peggy Storrar (GK)
5. Jana Withrow (GK)
6. Christine Debow
7. Kris Fillat
8. Kelli James
9. Tracey Fuchs (c)
10. Antoinette Lucas
11. Katie Kauffman
12. Lori Mastropietro
13. Kristien Holmes
14. Pam Neiss
15. Jill Reeve
16. Carolyn Schwarz

== Pool B ==
=== Argentina ===
- Head Coach: Sergio Vigil
1. Laura Mulhall (GK)
2. Sofía MacKenzie
3. Magdalena Aicega
4. Alejandra Gulla
5. Anabel Gambero
6. Ayelén Stepnik
7. Gabriela Liz
8. Gabriela Pando
9. Vanina Oneto
10. Jorgelina Rimoldi
11. Karina Masotta (c)
12. Mariana González Oliva
13. Mariela Antoniska (GK)
14. Mercedes Margalot
15. Luciana Aymar
16. Cecilia Rognoni

=== England ===
- Head Coach: Maggie Souyave
1. Hilary Rose (GK)
2. Carolyn Reid (GK)
3. Jackie Empson
4. Jane Smith
5. Karen Brown
6. Melanie Clewlow
7. Sarah Blanks
8. Kirsty Bowden (c)
9. Lisa Copeland
10. Jane Sixsmith
11. Lucilla Wright
12. Joanne Mould
13. Jennie Bimson
14. Kerry Moore
15. Fiona Greenham
16. Purdy Miller

=== India ===
The squad was announced on 14 April 1998.

- Head Coach: Balbir Singh
1. Helen Innocent (GK)
2. Sandeep Kaur (c)
3. Renu Bala
4. Helen Soy
5. Sita Gussain
6. Sumrai Tete
7. Shashi Bala
8. Manjinder Kaur
9. Kamla Dalal
10. Pritam Rani
11. Nidhi Khullar
12. Tingonleima Chanu (GK)
13. Mary Tirkey
14. Suraj Lata Devi
15. Jyoti Sunita Kullu
16. Sanggai Chanu

=== South Korea ===
- Head Coach: Kim Do-soon
1. Park Yong-sook (GK)
2. Kim Eun-jin
3. Lee Seon-hwa
4. Yoo Hee-joo
5. Kim Tae-seon
6. Kim Myung-ok
7. Kim Seong-eun
8. Choi Kwan-sook
9. Choi Mi-soon
10. Woo Hyun-jung
11. Kim Soo-jung
12. Cho Bo-ra
13. Oh Seung-shin (c)
14. Park Eun-kyung
15. Lee Eun-young
16. Choi Kyung-hee (GK)

=== New Zealand ===
- Head Coach: Paul Ackerley
1. Skippy Hamahona
2. Moira Senior
3. Leisen Jobe
4. Sandy Bennett
5. Diana Weavers
6. Tina Bell-Kake
7. Anna Lawrence (c)
8. Robyn Mathews
9. Jenny Duck
10. Kate Trolove
11. Kylie Foy
12. Mandy Smith
13. Lisa Walton
14. Suzie Pearce
15. Helen Clarke (GK)
16. Karen Smith (GK)

=== Netherlands ===
- Head Coach: Tom van 't Hek
1. Clarinda Sinnige (GK)
2. Daphne Touw (GK)
3. Inge Broek
4. Julie Deiters
5. Ellen Kuipers
6. Jeannette Lewin
7. Hanneke Smabers
8. Dillianne van den Boogaard
9. Margje Teeuwen
10. Mijntje Donners
11. Ageeth Boomgaardt
12. Fatima Moreira de Melo
13. Minke Smabers
14. Carole Thate (c)
15. Fleur van de Kieft
16. Suzan van der Wielen
