= 1998 Women's Hockey International Challenge =

Women's field hockey tournament

Women's International Challenge
Tournament details
- Host country: Australia
- Dates: 26 March–5 April
- Teams: 4 (from 3 confederations)
- Venue: 2 (in 2 host cities)

Final positions
- Champions: Australia (1st title)
- Runner-up: Argentina
- Third place: Germany

Tournament statistics
- Matches played: 14
- Goals scored: 47 (3.36 per match)
- Top scorer(s): (Australia) Alyson Annan (Australia) Claire Mitchell-Taverner (Australia) Katrina Powell (3 goals)
- Best player: (Germany) Heike Lätzsch

The 1998 Women's Hockey International Challenge was a women's field hockey tournament, consisting of a series of test matches. It was held in Sydney and Adelaide, from 26 March to 5 April, 1999.

Australia won the tournament, defeating Argentina 3–2 in the final. Germany finished in third place after winning the third place match 4–3 against the United States.

== Competition format ==
The tournament featured the national teams of Argentina, Australia, Germany and the United States. The teams competed in a double round-robin format, with each team playing each other twice. Three points were awarded for a win, one for a draw, and none for a loss.

== Officials ==
The following umpires were appointed by the International Hockey Federation to officiate the tournament:

- Peri Buckley (AUS)
- Renée Chatas (USA)
- Ute Conen (GER)
- Laura Crespo (ARG)
- Gina Spitaleri (ITA)

== Results ==
=== Preliminary round ===
| Pos | Team | Pld | W | D | L | GF | GA | GD | Pts | Qualification |
|---|---|---|---|---|---|---|---|---|---|---|
| 1 | Australia (H) | 6 | 4 | 1 | 1 | 15 | 4 | +11 | 13 | Advanced to Final |
| 2 | Argentina | 6 | 3 | 2 | 1 | 10 | 6 | +4 | 11 | Advanced to Final |
| 3 | Germany | 6 | 3 | 1 | 2 | 8 | 6 | +2 | 10 | |
| 4 | United States | 6 | 0 | 0 | 6 | 2 | 19 | −17 | 0 | |

Source: Hockey Australia
Rules for classification: 1) points; 2) goal difference; 3) goals scored; 4) head-to-head result.
(H) Hosts

==== Fixtures ====
26 March 1998
18:00 (AEDT)

| Australia | 4–0 | United States |
|---|---|---|
| Andrews 22'; Dobson 33'; Hawkes 42'; Mitchell-Taverner 64' | Report |

Homebush Hockey Stadium, Sydney
Umpires:
Laura Crespo (ARG)
Gina Spitaleri (ITA)

26 March 1998
20:00 (AEDT)

| Argentina | 0–0 | Germany |
|---|---|---|
| | Report |

Homebush Hockey Stadium, Sydney
Umpires:
Peri Buckley (AUS)
Renée Chatas (USA)

28 March 1998
12:00 (AEDT)

| United States | 0–4 | Germany |
|---|---|---|
| | Report | Lätzsch 22'; Reiter 25'; Becker 46'; Ernsting-Krienke 62' |

Homebush Hockey Stadium, Sydney
Umpires:
Gina Spitaleri (ITA)
Peri Buckley (AUS)

28 March 1998
14:00 (AEDT)

| Australia | 1–1 | Argentina |
|---|---|---|
| Dobson 23' | Report | Oneto 35' |

Homebush Hockey Stadium, Sydney
Umpires:
Renée Chatas (USA)
Ute Conen (GER)

29 March 1998
12:00 (AEST)

| United States | 1–3 | Argentina |
|---|---|---|
| Lucas 48' | Report | MacKenzie 8'; Castelli 11'; Aymar 22' |

Homebush Hockey Stadium, Sydney
Umpires:
Ute Conen (GER)
Gina Spitaleri (ITA)

29 March 1998
14:00 (AEST)

| Germany | 1–0 | Australia |
|---|---|---|
| Lätzsch 38' | Report |

Homebush Hockey Stadium, Sydney
Umpires:
Laura Crespo (ARG)
Renée Chatas (USA)

1 April 1998
18:00 (ACST)

| Argentina | 1–3 | Australia |
|---|---|---|
| Stepnik 7' | Report | Langham 46'; Annan 52'; Mott 55' |

State Hockey Centre, Adelaide
Umpires:
Renée Chatas (USA)
Peri Buckley (AUS)

1 April 1998
20:00 (ACST)

| Germany | 2–0 | United States |
|---|---|---|
| Ernsting-Krienke 38'; Suxdorf 59' | Report |

State Hockey Centre, Adelaide
Umpires:
Laura Crespo (ARG)
Gina Spitaleri (ITA)

2 April 1998
18:00 (ACST)

| Argentina | 2–0 | United States |
|---|---|---|
| Gulla 50', 62' | Report |

State Hockey Centre, Adelaide
Umpires:
Ute Conen (GER)
Peri Buckley (AUS)

2 April 1998
20:00 (ACST)

| Australia | 3–0 | Germany |
|---|---|---|
| K. Powell 12', 30'; Free 33' | Report |

State Hockey Centre, Adelaide
Umpires:
Gina Spitaleri (ITA)
Laura Crespo (ARG)

4 April 1998
12:00 (ACST)

| United States | 1–4 | Australia |
|---|---|---|
| Reeve 65' | Report | Annan 2'; L. Powell 6'; K. Powell 26'; Langham 40' |

State Hockey Centre, Adelaide
Umpires:
Laura Crespo (ARG)
Ute Conen (GER)

4 April 1998
14:00 (ACST)

| Germany | 1–3 | Argentina |
|---|---|---|
| Reiter 47' | Report | Rognoni 9'; Pando 43'; Oneto 65' |

State Hockey Centre, Adelaide
Umpires:
Peri Buckley (AUS)
Renée Chatas (USA)

=== Classification round ===
==== Third and fourth place ====
5 April 1998
12:00 (ACST)

| Germany | 4–3 | United States |
|---|---|---|
| Kauschke 9'; Dickenscheid 12'; Klecker 16'; Becker 35' | Report | Fuchs 21', 52'; James 49' |

State Hockey Centre, Adelaide
Umpires:
Peri Buckley (AUS)
Laura Crespo (ARG)

==== Final ====
5 April 1998
14:30 (ACST)

| Australia | 3–2 (a.e.t.) | Argentina |
|---|---|---|
| Annan 24'; Mitchell-Taverner 58', 72' | Report | Rognoni 30'; Masotta 40' |

State Hockey Centre, Adelaide
Umpires:
Gina Spitaleri (ITA)
Ute Conen (GER)

== Statistics ==
=== Final standings ===
| Pos | Team | Pld | W | D | L | GF | GA | GD | Pts | Status |
|---|---|---|---|---|---|---|---|---|---|---|
| 1st place, gold medalist(s) | Australia (H) | 7 | 5 | 1 | 1 | 18 | 6 | +12 | 16 | Tournament Champion |
| 2nd place, silver medalist(s) | Argentina | 7 | 3 | 2 | 2 | 12 | 9 | +3 | 11 | |
| 3rd place, bronze medalist(s) | Germany | 7 | 4 | 1 | 2 | 12 | 9 | +3 | 13 | |
| 4 | United States | 7 | 0 | 0 | 7 | 5 | 23 | −18 | 0 | |

Source: Hockey Australia
(H) Hosts

=== Goalscorers ===
There were 47 goals scored in 14 matches, for an average of 3.36 goals per match.

3 goals

- (Australia) Alyson Annan
- (Australia) Claire Mitchell-Taverner
- (Australia) Katrina Powell

2 goals

- (Argentina) Alejandra Gulla
- (Argentina) Vanina Oneto
- (Argentina) Cecilia Rognoni
- (Australia) Louise Dobson
- (Australia) Bianca Langham
- (Germany) Britta Becker
- (Germany) Nadine Ernsting-Krienke
- (Germany) Heike Lätzsch
- (Germany) Cornelia Reiter
- (United States) Tracey Fuchs

1 goal

- (Argentina) Luciana Aymar
- (Argentina) María Castelli
- (Argentina) Sofía MacKenzie
- (Argentina) Karina Masotta
- (Argentina) Gabriela Pando
- (Argentina) Ayelén Stepnik
- (Australia) Michelle Andrews
- (Australia) Kelly Free
- (Australia) Rechelle Hawkes
- (Australia) Nicole Mott
- (Australia) Lisa Powell
- (Germany) Tanja Dickenscheid
- (Germany) Katrin Kauschke
- (Germany) Denise Klecker
- (Germany) Philippa Suxdorf
- (United States) Kelli James
- (United States) Antoinette Lucas
- (United States) Jill Reeve
