= 1997 Women's Hockey Junior World Cup =

International field hockey competition

Junior Hockey World Cup 1997

Tournament details
- Host country: South Korea
- City: Seongnam
- Dates: 2–13 September
- Teams: 12 (from 5 confederations)
- Venue: Seongnam Sports Complex

Final positions
- Champions: Netherlands (1st title)
- Runner-up: Australia
- Third place: Argentina

Tournament statistics
- Matches played: 42
- Goals scored: 232 (5.52 per match)
- Top scorer: (China) Wang Jiuyan (14 goals)
- Best player: (Argentina) Alejandra Gulla

The 1997 Women's Hockey Junior World Cup was the 3rd edition of the Women's Hockey Junior World Cup. It was held from 2 to 13 September 1997 in Seongnam, South Korea.

Netherlands won the tournament for the first time after defeating Australia 2–0 in the final. Argentina won the third place match by defeating Germany 3–1 in the third and fourth place playoff.

== Teams ==
Each continental federation received a number of quotas depending on the FIH World Rankings for teams qualified through their junior continental championships. Alongside the host nation, 16 teams competed in the tournament.

- Argentina (defending champions)
- Australia
- Canada
- China
- England
- Germany
- Netherlands
- South Africa
- South Korea
- Spain
- Ukraine
- United States

== Results ==
=== First round ===
==== Pool A ====
Pos	Team	Pld	W	D	L	GF	GA	GD	Pts	Qualification
1	Australia	5	5	0	0	22	7	+15	15	Semi-Finals
2	Germany	5	2	2	1	14	8	+6	8	Semi-Finals
3	China	5	2	2	1	13	12	+1	8	Fifth to eighth
4	England	5	2	1	2	14	9	+5	7	Fifth to eighth
5	Spain	5	1	1	3	7	16	−9	4	Ninth to Twelfth
6	Canada	5	0	0	5	1	19	−18	0	Ninth to Twelfth

Source: todor66
Rules for classification: 1) points; 2) goal difference; 3) goals scored; 4) head-to-head result.

2 September 1997
09:00

England	6–0	Spain
Miller 2'; Clewlow 4', 60'; Walker 17'; Wright 20'; Moore 22'	Report

Umpires:
Marelize de Klerk (RSA)
Lynette Farrell (NZL)

2 September 1997
11:00

Germany	3–3	China
Keller 30', 36', 37'	Report	Wang J. 13', 56'; Qu 43'

Umpires:
Lee Mi-ok (KOR)
Gina Spitaleri (ITA)

2 September 1997
16:30

Canada	0–5	Australia
	Report	K. Towers 17', 36'; Mott 35', 64'; J. Towers 44'

3 September 1997
14:00

China	2–2	Spain
Wang J. 12'; Qu 42'	Report	Imbers 47', 61'

Umpires:
Marelize de Klerk (RSA)
Lee Seon-young (KOR)

3 September 1997
16:00

Canada	0–4	England
	Report	Moore 30'; Bimson 33'; Clewlow 42'; Wright 48'

Umpires:
Lee Mi-ok (KOR)
Lynette Farrell (NZL)

4 September 1997
10:00

Australia	3–2	Germany
B. Imison 14', 45', 70'	Report	Boie 25'; Casaretto 44'

Umpires:
Kazuko Yasueda (JPN)
Edna Rutten (NED)

5 September 1997
11:00

China	2–0	Canada
Wang J. 24', 70'	Report

Umpires:
Edna Rutten (NED)
Marelize de Klerk (RSA)

5 September 1997
14:00

Australia	5–2	England
B. Imison 11'; J. Towers 19', 28', 37'; Smith 66'	Report	Clewlow 30'; Wright 39'

Umpires:
Gina Spitaleri (ITA)
Lee Mi-ok (KOR)

5 September 1997
16:00

Germany	3–2	Spain
Schultz-Gerstein 17', 58'; Keller 38'	Report	S. González 6'; A. González 10'

Umpires:
Lynette Farrell (NZL)
Lee Seon-young (KOR)

7 September 1997
10:00

England	2–4	China
Wright 27'; Greenham 29'	Report	Qu 37'; Wang J. 51', 64', 68'

Umpires:
Edna Rutten (NED)
Lynette Farrell (NZL)

7 September 1997
12:00

Germany	6–0	Canada
Von Livonius 4', 20'; Wiedersich 29'; Keller 53'; Reiter 61'; Schultz-Gerstein 62'	Report

Umpires:
Janice MacDonald (SCO)
Marelize de Klerk (RSA)

7 September 1997
14:00

Spain	1–4	Australia
Camón 2'	Report	Mott 36'; J. Towers 53', 62'; Ringrose 70'

Umpires:
Lee Mi-ok (KOR)
Lee Seon-young (KOR)

8 September 1997
14:00

England	0–0	Germany
	Report

Umpires:
Kazuko Yasueda (JPN)
Gina Spitaleri (ITA)

8 September 1997
16:00

Australia	5–2	China
K. Towers 11'; Mott 25', 44', 46'; J. Towers 59'	Report	Wang J. 22'; Lu 41'

Umpires:
Marelize de Klerk (RSA)
Lee Seon-young (KOR)

9 September 1997
10:00

Spain	2–1	Canada
Pérez 36', 68'	Report	Grimes 28'

Umpires:
Lee Mi-ok (KOR)
Edna Rutten (NED)

==== Pool B ====
Pos	Team	Pld	W	D	L	GF	GA	GD	Pts	Qualification
1	Netherlands	5	4	1	0	24	3	+21	13	Semi-Finals
2	Argentina	5	3	2	0	25	4	+21	11	Semi-Finals
3	South Korea (H)	5	3	1	1	22	6	+16	10	Fifth to eighth
4	South Africa	5	2	0	3	15	12	+3	6	Fifth to eighth
5	Ukraine	5	1	0	4	13	25	−12	3	Ninth to Twelfth
6	United States	5	0	0	5	2	51	−49	0	Ninth to Twelfth

Source: todor66
Rules for classification: 1) points; 2) goal difference; 3) goals scored; 4) head-to-head result.
(H) Hosts

2 September 1997
14:30

South Africa	2–5	South Korea
Coetzee 46', 58'	Report	Woo 11', 31', 33', 60'; Kim M. 25'

Umpires:
Jane Nockolds (ENG)
Heike Malina (GER)

3 September 1997
10:00

Argentina	5–1	Ukraine
Aymar 6', 31', 47'; Rognoni 26', 60'	Report	Fritshe 23'

Umpires:
Janice MacDonald (SCO)
Hu Youfang (CHN)

3 September 1997
12:00

Netherlands	13–0	United States
Mulder 1', 47'; De Bruijn 7', 53'; Smabers 11'; Van Kessel 13', 40'; Cornelis 18', 35'; Abbas 52', 64', 69', 70'	Report

Umpires:
Janice McClintock (CAN)
Kazuko Yasueda (JPN)

4 September 1997
12:00

South Korea	10–0	Ukraine
Kim S. 5', 25'; Jang 14', 19'; Lee Mi-H. 21', 61'; Lee Mi-S. 32'; Woo 53'; Yang 57'; Jung 68'	Report

Umpires:
Janice MacDonald (SCO)
Heike Malina (GER)

4 September 1997
14:00

United States	0–6	South Africa
	Report	Coetzee 15', 35'; Fourie 27'; Wessels 30', 62'; Agliotti 67'

Umpires:
Hu Youfang (CHN)
Gina Spitaleri (ITA)

4 September 1997
16:00

Argentina	1–1	Netherlands
Rognoni 59'	Report	Abbas 57'

Umpires:
Jane Nockolds (ENG)
Janice McClintock (CAN)

6 September 1997
12:00

Argentina	15–0	United States
	Report

6 September 1997
14:00

Netherlands	1–0	South Korea
	Report

6 September 1997
16:00

South Africa	4–1	Ukraine
	Report

7 September 1997
16:00

South Africa	1–3	Argentina
Wessels 69'	Report	Gulla 6', 19'; Rognoni 25'

Umpires:
Janice McClintock (CAN)
Gina Spitaleri (ITA)

8 September 1997
10:00

South Korea	6–2	United States
Jung 5'; Woo 28', 64'; Yang 33', 56'; Kim S. 50'	Report	Philbrook 11'; Gannon 35'

Umpires:
Lynette Farrell (NZL)
Heike Malina (GER)

8 September 1997
12:00

Ukraine	0–6	Netherlands
	Report	Karres 12', 38'; Van Kessel 15'; Abbas 53'; Hofstad 57'; Petri 65'

Umpires:
Jane Nockolds (ENG)
Hu Youfang (CHN)

9 September 1997
12:00

South Korea	1–1	Argentina
Kim S. 13'	Report	Rognoni 41'

Umpires:
Janice MacDonald (SCO)
Janice McClintock (CAN)

9 September 1997
14:00

Netherlands	3–2	South Africa
Abbas 33'; Karres 56'; Smabers 62'	Report	Wessels 63'; Gray 70'

Umpires:
Kazuko Yasueda (JPN)
Hu Youfang (CHN)

9 September 1997
16:00

United States	0–11	Ukraine
	Report	Kobzenko 7', 9', 13', 16'; Zaichenko 17'; Salenko 20', 43', 56', 59', 63'; Vynohradova 55'

Umpires:
Heike Malina (GER)
Jane Nockolds (ENG)

=== Second round ===
==== Ninth to twelfth place classification ====
Cross-overs
12 September 1997
Spain	4
United States	2
12 September 1997
Ukraine	9
Canada	1

Ninth and tenth place
13 September 1997
Spain	4
Ukraine	1
Eleventh and twelfth place
13 September 1997
United States	0
Canada	3

===== Cross-overs =====
12 September 1997
09:00

Spain	4–2	United States
Estany 14', 56'; Pérez 48'; A. González 52'	Report	Lusher 65'; Philbrook 69'

12 September 1997
11:30

Ukraine	9–1	Canada
Zaichenko 16', 27'; Fritshe 17'; Savenko 31', 36'; Salenko 37'; Syeda 46'; Kobzenko 61'; Tahijeva 67'	Report	Harris 59'

===== Eleventh and twelfth place =====
13 September 1997
09:00

United States	0–3	Canada
	Report	Dowdeswell 13'; Grimes 19'; Hunt 64'

===== Ninth and tenth place =====
13 September 1997
11:30

Spain	4–1	Ukraine
	Report	Tahijeva 33'

==== Fifth to eighth place classification ====
Cross-overs
11 September 1997
China	1 (1)
South Africa (pen.)	1 (4)
11 September 1997
South Korea	6
England	3

Fifth and sixth place
12 September 1997
South Africa	1
South Korea	3
Seventh and eighth Place
12 September 1997
China	4
England (p.s.o)	4

===== Cross-overs =====
11 September 1997
09:00

China	1–1	South Africa
Wang J. 38'	Report	Fourie 68'
Penalties
Wang R. (penalty shoot-out missed); Wang J. (penalty shoot-out scored); Qu (penalty shoot-out missed)	1–4	(penalty shoot-out scored) Coetzee; (penalty shoot-out scored) Laurie; (penalty shoot-out scored) Wessels; (penalty shoot-out scored) Agliotti

Umpires:
Janice McClintock (CAN)
Heike Malina (GER)

11 September 1997
11:30

South Korea	6–3	England
Lee M. 4'; Kim M. 31', 36', 56'; Woo 41'; Kim S. 66'	Report	Walker 46'; Turney 51'; Wright 66'

Umpires:
Edna Rutten (NED)
Lynette Farrell (NZL)

===== Seventh and eighth place =====
12 September 1997
16:30

China	4–4	England
Wang J. 13', 20', 26', 47'	Report	Bimson 39', 66'; Wright 61'; Turney 68'
Penalties
Wang J. (penalty shoot-out missed); Liu (penalty shoot-out scored); Lu (penalty shoot-out missed); Li S. (penalty shoot-out scored)	2–4	(penalty shoot-out scored) Greenham; (penalty shoot-out scored) Clewlow; (penalty shoot-out scored) Wooding; (penalty shoot-out missed) Turney; (penalty shoot-out scored) Walsh

===== Fifth and sixth place =====
12 September 1997
14:00

South Africa	1–3	South Korea
Coetzee 38'	Report	Woo 3'; Lee Mi-S. 33'; Park S. 47'

==== First to fourth place classification ====
Semi-Finals
11 September 1997
Australia	2
Argentina	1
11 September 1997
Netherlands	3
Germany	1

Final
13 September 1997
Australia	0
Netherlands	2
Third and fourth place
13 September 1997
Argentina	3
Germany	1

===== Semi-finals =====
11 September 1997
14:00

Australia	2–1 (a.e.t.)	Argentina
K. Towers 33'; Mott 76'	Report	Gulla 56'

Umpires:
Kazuko Yasueda (JPN)
Jane Nockolds (ENG)

11 September 1997
16:30

Netherlands	3–1	Germany
Abbas 24', 38'; Petri 42'	Report	Reiter 5'

Umpires:
Janice MacDonald (SCO)
Gina Spitaleri (ITA)

===== Third and fourth place =====
13 September 1997
14:00

Argentina	3–1	Germany
Gulla 10', 47'; Cohen 35'	Report	Keller 44'

===== Final =====
13 September 1997
16:30

Australia	0–2	Netherlands
	Report	Karres 42'; Abbas 45'

== Awards ==
Player of the Tournament	Top Goalscorer	Goalkeeper of the Tournament	Fair Play
(Argentina) Alejandra Gulla	(China) Wang Jiuyan	(Australia) Rachel Imison	United States

== Statistics ==
=== Final standings ===
1. Netherlands
2. Australia
3. Argentina
4. Germany
5. South Korea
6. South Africa
7. England
8. China
9. Spain
10. Ukraine
11. Canada
12. United States
