= 1996 Women's Hockey Inter Nations Cup =

Tournament details
- Host country: Trinidad and Tobago
- City: Port of Spain
- Dates: 16–27 October
- Teams: 12 (from 5 confederations)
- Venue: National Hockey Centre

Final positions
- Champions: New Zealand (1st title)
- Runner-up: Japan
- Third place: India

Tournament statistics
- Matches played: 42
- Goals scored: 172 (4.1 per match)
- Top scorer: (Belgium) Marianne Schaefer (14 goals)
- Best player: (New Zealand) Tina Bell-Kake
- Best goalkeeper: (Japan) Nami Miyazaki

The 1996 Women's Hockey Inter Nations Cup was the third and final edition of the Inter Nations Cup. It was held at the National Hockey Centre in Port of Spain, Trinidad and Tobago, from 16 to 27 October 1996.

The tournament served as the first stage of qualification for the 1998 Hockey World Cup, with the top five teams advancing to the 1997 Intercontinental Cup held in Harare, Zimbabwe.

== Participating nations ==
The following 12 teams participated in the tournament.

- Belgium
- Cuba
- Czech Republic
- France
- India
- Italy
- Japan
- Jamaica
- New Zealand
- Scotland
- South Africa
- Trinidad and Tobago

== Preliminary round ==
=== Pool A ===
Pos	Team	Pld	W	D	L	GF	GA	GD	Pts	Qualification
1	India	5	4	0	1	10	4	+6	12	Semi-finals
2	Scotland	5	3	1	1	15	4	+11	10	Semi-finals
3	South Africa	5	3	1	1	12	4	+8	10	Fifth to eighth place
4	Italy	5	1	3	1	7	3	+4	6	Fifth to eighth place
5	Jamaica	5	1	0	4	2	17	−15	3	Ninth to twelfth place
6	Trinidad and Tobago (H)	5	0	1	4	3	17	−14	1	Ninth to twelfth place

Source: fieldhockey.com
Rules for classification: 1) points; 2) matches won; 3) goal difference; 4) goals for; 5) head-to-head result; 6) field goals for.
(H) Hosts

16 October 1996
09:00

India	1–0	Italy
Sandeep 62'	Report

16 October 1996
17:00

Trinidad and Tobago	0–3	South Africa
	Report	Coetzee 15'; Bentley 35'; Carlisle 41'

16 October 1996
19:00

Scotland	5–0	Jamaica
Simpson 12', 38'; Burton 18'; Neil 45'; Gilmore 52'	Report

17 October 1996
18:00

Jamaica	0–2	India
	Report	Jyoti 50'; Sandeep 61'

17 October 1996
20:00

Trinidad and Tobago	0–6	Scotland
	Report	Simpson 16', 27', 41'; Fraser 31', 56', 63'

18 October 1996
09:00

Italy	1–1	South Africa
Villa 47'	Report	MacNaughton 56'

19 October 1996
09:00

Scotland	1–2	India
Fraser 47'	Report	Sandeep 4'; Pritam 6'

19 October 1996
16:00

Jamaica	0–4	South Africa
	Report	MacNaughton 15'; Bee 19'; Roberts 33'; Bentley 55'

19 October 1996
18:00

Trinidad and Tobago	1–1	Italy
Nancoo 8'	Report	Scalia 15'

21 October 1996
09:00

Jamaica	2–1	Trinidad and Tobago
May 50'; Clarke 57'	Report	De Roche 52'

21 October 1996
16:00

Italy	0–0	Scotland
	Report

21 October 1996
18:00

India	0–2	South Africa
	Report	Coetzee 62', 69'

22 October 1996
18:00

Jamaica	0–5	Italy
	Report	Faustini 9', 41'; Turella 21'; Scalia 52'; Ughetto 57'

22 October 1996
20:00

India	5–1	Trinidad and Tobago
Pritam 12', 30'; Sandeep 33'; Nidhi 54'; Ferdina 63'	Report	Siu Butt 68'

23 October 1996
09:00

Scotland	3–2	South Africa
Fraser 17', 45'; Simpson 27'	Report	Bentley 59'; Bee 70'

=== Pool B ===
Pos	Team	Pld	W	D	L	GF	GA	GD	Pts	Qualification
1	New Zealand	5	5	0	0	29	3	+26	15	Semi-finals
2	Japan	5	4	0	1	12	6	+6	12	Semi-finals
3	Belgium	5	2	1	2	12	11	+1	7	Fifth to eighth place
4	France	5	2	0	3	9	14	−5	6	Fifth to eighth place
5	Czech Republic	5	1	1	3	6	13	−7	4	Ninth to twelfth place
6	Cuba	5	0	0	5	1	22	−21	0	Ninth to twelfth place

Source: fieldhockey.com
Rules for classification: 1) points; 2) matches won; 3) goal difference; 4) goals for; 5) head-to-head result; 6) field goals for.

16 October 1996
21:00

Belgium	1–1	Czech Republic
Schaefer 54'	Report	Čermáková 5'

17 October 1996
09:00

Cuba	1–3	France
Drake 11'	Report	Llobet 6', 35'; De Rivau 62'

17 October 1996
16:00

Japan	1–4	New Zealand
Miura 60'	Report	Foy 26'; Lawrence 31'; Senior 67'; Bell-Kake 70'

18 October 1996
16:00

New Zealand	5–1	Belgium
Trolove 12'; Foy 17'; Walton 39'; Bell-Kake 60'; Lawrence 66'	Report	Schaefer 57'

18 October 1996
18:00

France	0–2	Japan
	Report	Minbuta 9'; Nishimoto 22'

18 October 1996
20:00

Czech Republic	3–0	Cuba
Čermáková 38', 52'; Turková 60'	Report

20 October 1996
09:00

Belgium	5–0	Cuba
Schaefer 12', 21', 50', 64'; Gierts 32'	Report

20 October 1996
16:00

Japan	3–1	Czech Republic
Miura 10'; Minbuta 40'; Takahashi 68'	Report	Ivanová 8'

20 October 1996
18:00

New Zealand	7–0	France
Lawrence 14', 20', 40'; Foy 24', 41'; Pearce 25'; Senior 34'	Report

21 October 1996
20:00

Cuba	0–3	Japan
	Report	Takahashi 30'; Minbuta 34'; Miura 61'

22 October 1996
09:00

Czech Republic	1–5	New Zealand
Čermáková 7'	Report	Trolove 4'; Lawrence 34', 37', 70'; Senior 35'

22 October 1996
16:00

France	2–4	Belgium
Llobet 11'; Lejousse 23'	Report	Gierts 34'; Schaefer 52', 57', 68'

23 October 1996
16:00

New Zealand	8–0	Cuba
Trolove 6', 31', 50'; Foy 14'; Lawrence 18', 62'; Walton 21', 29'	Report

23 October 1996
18:00

Czech Republic	0–4	France
	Report	Llobet 22'; Lejousse 39'; Cantogrel 43'; Peyrelongue 64'

23 October 1996
20:00

Belgium	1–3	Japan
Schaefer 14'	Report	S. Miyazaki 2', 6'; Kato 9'

== Classification round ==
=== Ninth to twelfth place ===
Crossover
26 October
Jamaica	0
Cuba	3
26 October
Czech Republic	6
Trinidad and Tobago	3

Ninth place
27 October
Cuba	2
Czech Republic	3
Eleventh place
27 October
Jamaica (pen.)	2 (5)
Trinidad and Tobago	2 (4)

==== Crossovers ====
26 October 1996
09:00

Jamaica	0–3	Cuba
	Report	Trujillo 32'; Lago de los Arlos 43', 44'

26 October 1996
16:00

Czech Republic	6–3	Trinidad and Tobago
Turková 8'; Červená 18'; Stanková 36'; Čermáková 45', 51'; Samcová 67'	Report	Walker-Bath 20', 24'; Siut Bitt 29'

==== Eleventh and twelfth place ====
27 October 1996
09:00

Jamaica	2–2 (a.e.t.)	Trinidad and Tobago
Allen 26'; May 52'	Report	Siu Butt 25'; Walker-Bath 39'
Penalties
	5–4

==== Ninth and tenth place ====
27 October 1996
14:00

Cuba	2–3	Czech Republic
Lago de los Arlos 10'; Drake 12'	Report	Červená 3'; Ivanová 40'; Čermáková 63'

=== Fifth to eighth place ===
Crossover
25 October
South Africa	6
France	1
25 October
Belgium	1
Italy	2

Fifth place
26 October
South Africa	1
Italy	0
Seventh place
26 October
France	3
Belgium	4

==== Crossovers ====
25 October 1996
09:00

South Africa	6–1	France
Carlisle 18'; Roberts 21'; Coetzee 29'; Bentley 40'; Bee 47'; Dalling 56'	Report	Dufour 49'

Umpires:
Michelle Arnold (AUS)
Lynne Fotheringham (SCO)

25 October 1996
16:00

Belgium	1–2	Italy
Schaefer 4'	Report	Turella 48'; Cotelli 59'

Umpires:
Mary Power (IRE)
Karen Smith (NZL)

==== Seventh and eighth place ====
26 October 1996
18:30

France	3–4	Belgium
Llobet 8'; Lejousse 30', 65'	Report	Chardome 12'; Schaefer 25', 30', 58'

==== Fifth and sixth place ====
26 October 1996
21:30

South Africa	1–0	Italy
Bee 3'	Report

== Medal round ==
Semi-finals
25 October
India	2
Japan	3
25 October
New Zealand	5
Scotland	1

Final
27 October
Japan	1
New Zealand	2
Third place
27 October
India	1
Scotland	0

=== Semi-finals ===
25 October 1996
18:30

India	2–3 (a.e.t.)	Japan
Neha 24'; Sandeep 50'	Report	Iwao 56'; Minbuta 64'; S. Miyazaki 71'

Umpires:
Marlize De Klerk (RSA)
Cheryl Franco (TTO)

25 October 1996
21:00

New Zealand	5–1	Scotland
Lawrence 5'; Pearce 7'; Senior 37'; Trolove 64'; Bell-Kake 69'	Report	MacInnes 49'

=== Third and fourth place ===
27 October 1996
16:30

India	1–0	Scotland
Sita 54'	Report

=== Final ===
27 October 1996
19:00

Japan	1–2	New Zealand
Takahashi 12'	Report	Lawrence 16', 20'

== Awards ==
The following awards were presented at the conclusion of the tournament.

Player of the Tournament	Top Scorer	Goalkeeper of the Tournament	Fair Play
(New Zealand) Tina Bell-Kake	(Belgium) Marianne Schaefer	(Japan) Nami Miyazaki	Trinidad and Tobago

In addition, the best players from each playing line were recognised with awards.

Best Defender	Best Midfielder	Best Forward
(Italy) Carla Cotelli	(South Africa) Karen Roberts	(Belgium) Marianne Schaefer

== Final standings ==
As per statistical convention in field hockey, matches decided in extra time are counted as wins and losses, while matches decided by penalty shoot-outs are counted as draws.

Pos	Team	Pld	W	D	L	GF	GA	GD	Pts	Status
1st place, gold medalist(s)	New Zealand	7	7	0	0	36	5	+31	21	Qualified for 1997 Intercontinental Cup
2nd place, silver medalist(s)	Japan	7	5	0	2	16	10	+6	15	Qualified for 1997 Intercontinental Cup
3rd place, bronze medalist(s)	India	7	5	0	2	13	7	+6	15	Qualified for 1997 Intercontinental Cup
4	Scotland	7	3	1	3	16	10	+6	10	Qualified for 1997 Intercontinental Cup
5	South Africa	7	5	1	1	19	5	+14	16	Qualified for 1997 Intercontinental Cup
6	Italy	7	2	3	2	9	5	+4	9	
7	Belgium	7	3	1	3	17	16	+1	10	
8	France	7	2	0	5	13	24	−11	6	
9	Czech Republic	7	3	1	3	15	18	−3	10	
10	Cuba	7	1	0	6	6	25	−19	3	
11	Jamaica	7	1	1	5	4	22	−18	4	
12	Trinidad and Tobago (H)	7	0	2	5	8	25	−17	2	

Source: fieldhockey.com
(H) Hosts

== Goalscorers ==
There were 172 goals scored in 42 matches, for an average of 4.1 goals per match.

14 goals

- (Belgium) Marianne Schaefer

13 goals

- (New Zealand) Anna Lawrence

7 goals

- (Czech Republic) Petra Čermáková

6 goals

- (New Zealand) Kate Trolove
- (Scotland) Susan Fraser
- (Scotland) Rhona Simpson

5 goals

- (France) Sophie Llobet
- (India) Sandeep Kaur
- (New Zealand) Kylie Foy

4 goals

- (France) Sophie Lejousse
- (Japan) Kozue Minbuta
- (New Zealand) Moira Senior
- (South Africa) Kerry Bee
- (South Africa) Caryn Bentley
- (South Africa) Pietie Coetzee

3 goals

- (Cuba) Saray Lago de los Arlos
- (India) Pritam Rani Thakran
- (Japan) Keiko Miura
- (Japan) Sahori Miyazaki
- (Japan) Hisayo Takahashi
- (New Zealand) Tina Bell-Kake
- (New Zealand) Lisa Walton
- (Trinidad and Tobago) Stacey-Ann Siu Butt
- (Trinidad and Tobago) Gillian Walker-Bath

2 goals

- (Belgium) Sofie Gierts
- (Cuba) Yaquelin Drake
- (Czech Republic) Kateřina Červená
- (Czech Republic) Martina Ivanová
- (Czech Republic) Monika Turková
- (Italy) Francesca Faustini
- (Italy) Sonia Scalia
- (Italy) Alessia Turella
- (Jamaica) Erica May
- (New Zealand) Suzanne Pearce
- (South Africa) Lindsey Carlisle
- (South Africa) Michele MacNaughton
- (South Africa) Karen Roberts

1 goal

- (Belgium) Geraldine Chardome
- (Cuba) Yolaysis Trujillo
- (Czech Republic) Martina Samcová
- (Czech Republic) Eva Stanková
- (France) Violanne Cantogrel
- (France) Veronique Dufour
- (France) Laetitia Peyrelongue
- (France) Clarisse de Rivau
- (India) Ferdina Ekka
- (India) Sita Gussain
- (India) Nidhi Khular
- (India) Jyoti Sunita Kullu
- (India) Neha Singh
- (Italy) Carla Cotelli
- (Italy) Silvana Ughetto
- (Italy) Simone Villa
- (Jamaica) Andrea Allen
- (Jamaica) Lisa Clarke
- (Japan) Sachimi Iwao
- (Japan) Akemi Kato
- (Japan) Masami Nishimoto
- (Scotland) Louise Burton
- (Scotland) Susan Gilmore
- (Scotland) Fiona MacInnes
- (Scotland) Valerie Neil
- (South Africa) Nadine Dalling
- (Trinidad and Tobago) Tamara Nancoo
- (Trinidad and Tobago) Dixie-Ann de Roche
