= 2001 Women's Hockey Champions Trophy =

Field hockey tournament

Tournament details
- Host country: Netherlands
- City: Amstelveen
- Dates: 18 – 26 August
- Teams: 6
- Venue: Wagener Stadium

Final positions
- Champions: Argentina (1st title)
- Runner-up: Netherlands
- Third place: Australia

Tournament statistics
- Matches played: 18
- Goals scored: 57 (3.17 per match)
- Top scorer: (Netherlands) Ageeth Boomgaardt (6 goals)
- Best player: (Argentina) Luciana Aymar

The 2001 Women's Hockey Champions Trophy was the 9th edition of the Hockey Champions Trophy for women. It was held from 18 to 26 August 2001 in Amstelveen, Netherlands.

Argentina won the tournament for the first time after defeating the Netherlands 3–2 in the final.

== Teams ==
The participating teams were determined by International Hockey Federation (FIH):

- Netherlands (Host nation and defending champions)
- Australia (Champions of 2000 Summer Olympics and 1998 World Cup)
- Argentina (Second in 2000 Summer Olympics)
- Spain (Fourth in 2000 Summer Olympics)
- China (Fifth in 2000 Summer Olympics)
- New Zealand (Sixth in 2000 Summer Olympics)

== Squads ==
Argentina

Head Coach: Sergio Vigil

1. Mariela Antoniska (GK)
3. Magdalena Aicega
4. Inés Arrondo
5. Anabel Gambero
6. Ayelén Stepnik
7. Alejandra Gulla
8. Luciana Aymar
9. Vanina Oneto
10. Jorgelina Rimoldi
11. Karina Masotta (c)
12. Mariana González Oliva
13. Laura Maiztegui
14. Mercedes Margalot
15. María de la Paz Hernández
16. Cecilia Rognoni
18. Paola Vukojicic (GK)
19. Mariné Russo
24. Claudia Burkart
Australia

Head Coach: David Bell

2. Louise Dobson
3. Karen Smith
4. Alyson Annan
5. Ngaire Smith
10. Bianca Netzler
11. Emily Halliday
17. Rachel Imison (GK)
18. Kristen Towers
20. Carmel Souter
21. Nina Bonner (GK)
23. Joanne Banning
24. Angie Skirving
25. Melanie Twitt
26. Megan Sargeant
28. Julie Towers
29. Tammy Cole
31. Katrina Powell (c)
32. Nikki Hudson (c)
China

Head Coach: Kim Chang-back

1. Nie Yali (GK)
2. Long Fengyu (c)
3. Chen Zhaoxia
4. Liu Lijie
5. Cheng Hui
7. Huang Junxia
8. Fu Baorong
9. Li Shuang
11. Tang Chunling
12. Zhou Wanfeng
15. Hou Xiaolan
16. Zhou Li (GK)
17. Li Haihong
19. Chen Qiuqi
20. Wang Jiuyan
21. Zhang Shuang
22. Li Aili
23. Ma Yibo
Netherlands

Head Coach: Marc Lammers

1. Clarinda Sinnige (GK)
2. Lisanne de Roever (GK)
3. Macha van der Vaart
4. Julie Deiters (c)
5. Fatima Moreira de Melo
6. Karlijn Petri
8. Dillianne van den Boogaard
9. Florien Cornelis
10. Mijntje Donners
11. Ageeth Boomgaardt
12. Kirsten de Groot
13. Minke Smabers
14. Ellis Verbakel
15. Janneke Schopman
16. Chantal de Bruijn
18. Minke Booij
19. Aniek van Hees
21. Maartje Scheepstra
New Zealand

Head Coach: Jan Borren

3. Paula Enoka
4. Sandy Bennett
5. Rachel Sutherland
6. Meredith Orr
7. Anna Lawrence
8. Jaimee Provan
9. Carol Ward
10. Lizzy Igasan
11. Michelle Turner
12. Mandy Smith (c)
14. Suzie Pearce
15. Anne-Marie Irving (GK)
16. Helen Clarke (GK)
17. Caryn Paewai
18. Diana Weavers
19. Leisen Jobe
21. Niniwa Roberts
Spain

Head Coach: Jack Holtman

1. María Jesús Rosa (GK)
2. Nuria Moreno
4. Begoña Larzabal (c)
5. Mónica Rueda
6. Silvia Bonastre
7. María del Carmen Martín
9. Silvia Muñoz
10. Lucía López
11. María del Mar Feito
12. Maider Tellería
15. Erdoitza Goikoetxea
16. Maider Luengo (GK)
17. Núria Camón
18. Ana Pérez
20. Susanna González
21. Miriam Fabregas
22. Maite Garreta
23. Rebeca Piñeiro

== Umpires ==
The International Hockey Federation appointed 9 umpires to officiate matches in the tournament:

- Michele Arnold (AUS)
- Peri Buckley (AUS)
- Renée Cohen (NED)
- Ute Conen (GER)
- Lyn Farrell (NZL)
- Soledad Iparraguirre (ARG)
- Jane Nockolds (ENG)
- Monica Rivera (ESP)
- Kazuko Yasueda (JPN)

== Results ==
All times are Central European Summer Time (UTC+02:00)

=== Pool ===
Pos	Team	Pld	W	D	L	GF	GA	GD	Pts	Qualification
1	Netherlands	5	5	0	0	17	3	+14	15	Final
2	Argentina	5	4	0	1	10	3	+7	12	Final
3	Australia	5	3	0	2	11	6	+5	9	
4	China	5	1	1	3	3	10	−7	4	
5	New Zealand	5	0	2	3	2	15	−13	2	
6	Spain	5	0	1	4	3	9	−6	1	

Source: FIH
Rules for classification: 1) points; 2) goal difference; 3) goals scored; 4) head-to-head result.

18 August 2001
12:00

China	0–2	Argentina
	Report	Aymar 15'; Oneto 62'

Umpires:
Michele Arnold (AUS)
Jane Nockolds (ENG)

18 August 2001
14:30

Netherlands	2–1	Spain
Donners 21', 42'	Report	Tellería 27'

Umpires:
Ute Conen (GER)
Lyn Farrell (NZL)

18 August 2001
17:00

New Zealand	1–5	Australia
Smith 66'	Report	Towers 2', 37'; Smith 26', 30'; Hudson 60'

Umpires:
Kazuko Yasueda (JPN)
Renée Cohen (NED)

19 August 2001
14:30

Netherlands	2–1	Argentina
Van den Boogaard 3'; Booij 27'	Report	Gulla 53'

Umpires:
Monica Rivera (ESP)
Peri Buckley (AUS)

19 August 2001
17:00

China	0–3	Australia
	Report	Smith 64'; Hudson 68'; Powell 69'

Umpires:
Jane Nockolds (ENG)
Ute Conen (GER)

19 August 2001
19:30

Spain	1–1	New Zealand
Rueda 17'	Report	Pearce 26'

Umpires:
Soledad Iparraguirre (ARG)
Michele Arnold (AUS)

21 August 2001
14:30

Spain	1–3	China
Moreno 44'	Report	Fu 31'; Li A. 57'; Tang 60'

Umpires:
Renée Cohen (NED)
Peri Buckley (AUS)

21 August 2001
17:00

Argentina	2–1	Australia
Margalot 34'; Rognoni 50'	Report	Hudson 6'

Umpires:
Lyn Farrell (NZL)
Kazuko Yasueda (JPN)

21 August 2001
19:00

Netherlands	6–0	New Zealand
Boomgaardt 13', 31'; De Groot 19'; Moreira de Melo 33', 70'; Van den Boogaard 35'	Report

Umpires:
Monica Rivera (ESP)
Soledad Iparraguirre (ARG)

22 August 2001
15:00

Spain	0–2	Argentina
	Report	Gulla 9'; Oneto 45'

Umpires:
Ute Conen (GER)
Michele Arnold (AUS)

22 August 2001
17:30

New Zealand	0–0	China
	Report

Umpires:
Soledad Iparraguirre (ARG)
Peri Buckley (AUS)

22 August 2001
20:00

Netherlands	3–1	Australia
Boomgaardt 11', 23'; Smabers 33'	Report	Hudson 42'

Umpires:
Lyn Farrell (NZL)
Jane Nockolds (ENG)

24 August 2001
15:00

New Zealand	0–3	Argentina
	Report	Rognoni 6'; Aicega 26'; Oneto 64'

Umpires:
Monica Rivera (ESP)
Kazuko Yasueda (JPN)

24 August 2001
17:30

Spain	0–1	Australia
	Report	Banning 57'

Umpires:
Soledad Iparraguirre (ARG)
Renée Cohen (NED)

24 August 2001
20:00

Netherlands	4–0	China
Van der Vaart 9'; De Groot 36', 63'; Boomgaardt 51'	Report

Umpires:
Peri Buckley (AUS)
Ute Conen (GER)

=== Classification ===
==== Fifth and sixth place ====
26 August 2001
09:00

New Zealand	2–1	Spain
Lawrence 8'; Pearce 33'	Report	Pérez 55'

Umpires:
Michele Arnold (AUS)
Renée Cohen (NED)

==== Third and fourth place ====
26 August 2001
11:30

Australia	2–1 (a.e.t.)	China
Powell 48', 81'	Report	Tang 41'

Umpires:
Ute Conen (GER)
Kazuko Yasueda (JPN)

==== Final ====
26 August 2001
14:00

Netherlands	2–3	Argentina
Deiters 51'; Boomgaardt 59'	Report	Rognoni 13'; Margalot 14'; Masotta 57'

Umpires:
Lyn Farrell (NZL)
Jane Nockolds (ENG)

Team details

Netherlands
Argentina

GK	1	Clarinda Sinnige
DF	3	Macha van der Vaart
DF	4	Julie Deiters	12'
MF	5	Fatima Moreira
MF	8	Dillianne van den Boogaard
MF	9	Florien Cornelis
MF	10	Mijntje Donners (c)
MF	11	Ageeth Boomgaardt
MF	13	Minke Smabers
FW	15	Janneke Schopman
FW	18	Minke Booij
Substitutions:
MF	12	Kirsten de Groot		(substituted on) 11'
MF	14	Ellis Verbakel		(substituted on) 10'
MF	16	Chantal de Bruijn		(substituted on) 11'
MF	21	Maartje Scheepstra		(substituted on) 47'
Manager:
(Netherlands) Marc Lammers

GK	1	Mariela Antoniska
DF	6	Ayelén Stepnik
DF	3	Magdalena Aicega
DF	14	Mercedes Margalot
DF	16	Cecilia Rognoni
DF	24	Claudia Burkart
MF	12	Mariana González Oliva
MF	5	Anabel Gambero
MF	8	Luciana Aymar
FW	9	Vanina Oneto
FW	11	Karina Masotta (c)
Substitutions:
FW	7	Alejandra Gulla	31'	(substituted on) 22'
MF	10	Jorgelina Rimoldi		(substituted on) 30'
FW	15	María Paz Hernández		(substituted on) 29'
FW	13	Laura Maiztegui		(substituted on) 68'
Manager:
(Argentina) Sergio Vigil

== Awards ==
Player of the Tournament	Top Goalscorer
(Argentina) Luciana Aymar	(Netherlands) Ageeth Boomgaardt

== Statistics ==
=== Final standings ===
1. Argentina
2. Netherlands
3. Australia
4. China
5. New Zealand
6. Spain

=== Goalscorers ===
There were 57 goals scored in 18 matches, for an average of 3.17 goals per match.

6 goals

- (Netherlands) Ageeth Boomgaardt

4 goals

- (Australia) Nikki Hudson

3 goals

- (Argentina) Vanina Oneto
- (Argentina) Cecilia Rognoni
- (Australia) Katrina Powell
- (Australia) Karen Smith
- (Netherlands) Kirsten de Groot

2 goals

- (Argentina) Alejandra Gulla
- (Argentina) Mercedes Margalot
- (Australia) Julie Towers
- (China) Tang Chunling
- (Netherlands) Mijntje Donners
- (Netherlands) Fatima Moreira de Melo
- (Netherlands) Dillianne van den Boogaard
- (New Zealand) Suzie Pearce

1 goal

- (Argentina) Magdalena Aicega
- (Argentina) Luciana Aymar
- (Argentina) Karina Masotta
- (Australia) Joanne Banning
- (China) Fu Baorong
- (China) Li Aili
- (Netherlands) Minke Booij
- (Netherlands) Julie Deiters
- (Netherlands) Minke Smabers
- (Netherlands) Macha van der Vaart
- (New Zealand) Anna Lawrence
- (New Zealand) Mandy Smith
- (Spain) Nuria Moreno
- (Spain) Ana Pérez
- (Spain) Mónica Rueda
- (Spain) Maider Tellería

Source: FIH
