= Field hockey at the 2003 Afro-Asian Games =

Field hockey at the 2003 Afro-Asian Games was held over a period of eight days, from 23 October to 31 October 2003. It was one of the two sports which started before the opening ceremony of the Games, the other being football. The medal ceremonies were held on 30 October (women) and 31 October (men). All events took place at the Gachibowli Hockey Stadium, Hyderabad, India.

== Competition ==
Eight teams each for the men's and women's events participated in the competition. The teams were divided into two pools, A and B, each consisting of four teams. Two rounds were held - league matches, and finals.

== Men's tournament ==
Tournament
Tournament details
- Host country: India
- City: Hyderabad
- Dates: 23–31 October
- Teams: 8 (from 2 confederations)

Final positions
- Champions: India (1st title)
- Runner-up: Pakistan
- Third place: South Korea

Tournament statistics
- Matches played: 20
- Goals scored: 80 (4 per match)
- Top scorer: (South Africa) Gareth Carr (6 goals)

=== Participating nations ===
- Egypt
- Ghana
- India
- Malaysia
- Nigeria
- Pakistan
- South Africa
- South Korea

=== Preliminary round ===
==== Pool A ====
Pos	Team	Pld	W	D	L	GF	GA	GD	Pts	Qualification
1	South Korea	3	3	0	0	7	1	+6	9	Semi-finals
2	Malaysia	3	1	1	1	7	3	+4	4	Semi-finals
3	South Africa	3	1	1	1	6	3	+3	4	
4	Ghana	3	0	0	3	0	13	−13	0	

Source: Rediff
Rules for classification: 1) points; 2) matches won; 3) goal difference; 4) goals for; 5) head-to-head result; 6) field goals scored.

23 October 2003
16:00

South Korea	3–0	Ghana
Yoon 26'; Yeo 31', 47'	Report

23 October 2003
18:00

Malaysia	1–1	South Africa
Norazlan 57'	Report	Fulton 43'

25 October 2003
14:00

Malaysia	5–0	Ghana
Ismail 14'; Kuhan 41', 57'; Amin 59'; Tajol 65'	Report

25 October 2003
18:00

South Africa	0–2	South Korea
	Report	You 23'; Yeo 55'

27 October 2003
16:00

South Africa	5–0	Ghana
Haley 6'; Carr 13', 15', 30'; Dolley 21'	Report

27 October 2003
18:00

South Korea	2–1	Malaysia
Lee J. 34'; Yeo 47'	Report	Mohan 41'

==== Pool B ====
Pos	Team	Pld	W	D	L	GF	GA	GD	Pts	Qualification
1	India (H)	3	3	0	0	14	6	+8	9	Semi-finals
2	Pakistan	3	2	0	1	9	8	+1	6	Semi-finals
3	Egypt	3	1	0	2	6	10	−4	3	
4	Nigeria	3	0	0	3	8	13	−5	0	

Source: Rediff
Rules for classification: 1) points; 2) matches won; 3) goal difference; 4) goals for; 5) head-to-head result; 6) field goals scored.
(H) Hosts

23 October 2003
14:00

Pakistan	4–3	Nigeria
Ali 3'; Raza 27'; Khalid 32', 64'	Report	Lamido 19'; Jatau 52'; David 63'

23 October 2003
20:00

India	5–1	Egypt
Prabhjot 5', 56'; Deepak 38'; Gagan 44'; P. Tirkey 67'	Report	Gamal 50'

25 October 2003
16:00

Egypt	1–3	Pakistan
S. Mohamed 66'	Report	Butt 9'; Abbasi 38'; Ali 43'

25 October 2003
20:00

India	5–3	Nigeria
D. Tirkey 25'; Deepak 28'; Sandeep 32'; Aiyappa 59', 75'	Report	Ademisoro 55', 64'; Lamido 73'

27 October 2003
16:00

Egypt	4–2	Nigeria
Enaba 12'; S. Mohamed 21'; Y. Mohamed 23'; W. Mohamed 67'	Report	Lamido 15'; David 29'

27 October 2003
20:00

Pakistan	2–4	India
Khalid 29'; Abbasi 32'	Report	Sandeep 22'; Prabhjot 39'; Gagan 42', 67'

=== Classification round ===
==== Bracket ====
Crossover
29 October
South Africa	4
Nigeria	0
29 October
Egypt	1
Ghana	0

Fifth place
31 October
South Africa (a.e.t)	3
Egypt	2
Seventh place
31 October
Nigeria	3
Ghana	2

==== Crossovers ====
29 October 2003
09:00

Egypt	1–0	Ghana
S. Mohamed 11'	Report

29 October 2003
11:30

South Africa	4–0	Nigeria
Fulton 12'; Carr 15'; Phillips 25'; Dolley 56'	Report

==== Seventh and eighth place ====
31 October 2003
09:00

Nigeria	3–2	Ghana
Menyei 15'; David 21'; Abrakassa 57'	Report	Frimpong 23'; Ofori 39'

==== Fifth and sixth place ====
31 October 2003
09:00

South Africa	3–2 (a.e.t.)	Egypt
Phillips 60'; Carr 69', 78'	Report	S. Mohamed 13'; Enaba 36'

=== Medal round ===
==== Bracket ====
Semi-finals
29 October
South Korea	0
Pakistan	2
29 October
India (pen.)	1 (5)
Malaysia	1 (3)

Final
31 October
Pakistan	1
India	3
Third place
31 October
South Korea (pen.)	0 (2)
Malaysia	0 (1)

==== Semi-finals ====
29 October 2003
16:30

South Korea	0–2	Pakistan
	Report	Ali 34'; Abbasi 60'

29 October 2003
19:00

India	1–1	Malaysia
Halappa 20'	Report	Chua 27'
Penalties
	5–3

==== Third and fourth place ====
31 October 2003
16:30

South Korea	0–0	Malaysia
	Report
Penalties
	2–1

==== Final ====
31 October 2003
19:00

Pakistan	1–3	India
Ali 15'	Report	Halappa 8'; Aiyappa 34'; Gagan 59'

=== Final standings ===
Pos	Grp	Team	Pld	W	D	L	GF	GA	GD	Pts	Final result
1	B	India (H)	5	4	1	0	18	8	+10	13	Gold medal
2	B	Pakistan	5	3	0	2	12	11	+1	9	Silver medal
3	A	South Korea	5	3	1	1	7	3	+4	10	Bronze medal
4	A	Malaysia	5	1	3	1	8	4	+4	6	
5	A	South Africa	5	3	1	1	13	5	+8	10	
6	B	Egypt	5	2	0	3	9	13	−4	6	
7	B	Nigeria	5	1	0	4	11	19	−8	3	
8	A	Ghana	5	0	0	5	2	17	−15	0	

Source: Rediff
(H) Hosts

=== Goalscorers ===
There were 80 goals scored in 20 matches, for an average of 4 goals per match.

6 goals

- (South Africa) Gareth Carr

4 goals

- (Egypt) Sameh Mohamed
- (India) Gagan Ajit Singh
- (Pakistan) Ghazanfar Ali
- (South Korea) Yeo Woon-kon

3 goals

- (India) Len Aiyappa
- (India) Prabhjot Singh
- (Nigeria) Sunday David
- (Nigeria) Auwolu Lamido
- (Pakistan) Shakeel Abbasi
- (Pakistan) Saleem Khalid

2 goals

- (Egypt) Belal Enaba
- (India) Arjun Halappa
- (India) Sandeep Michael
- (India) Deepak Thakur
- (Malaysia) Kuhan Shanmuganathan
- (Nigeria) Oluwa Ademisoro
- (South Africa) Denzil Dolley
- (South Africa) Craig Fulton
- (South Africa) Steven Phillips

1 goal

- (Egypt) Mohamad Gamal
- (Egypt) Walid Mohamed
- (Egypt) Yasser Mohamed
- (Ghana) Ebenezer Frimpong
- (Ghana) Isaac Ofori
- (India) Dilip Tirkey
- (India) Prabodh Tirkey
- (Malaysia) Ismail Abu
- (Malaysia) Chua Boon Huat
- (Malaysia) Mohan Jiwa
- (Malaysia) Tajol Rosli Mohamad
- (Malaysia) Amin Rahim
- (Malaysia) Norazlan Rahim
- (Nigeria) Samson Abrakassa
- (Nigeria) Nuhu Jatau
- (Nigeria) Peter Menyei
- (Pakistan) Rehan Butt
- (Pakistan) Ali Raza
- (South Africa) Ian Haley
- (South Korea) Lee Jung-seon
- (South Korea) Yoon Young-sik
- (South Korea) You Hyo-sik

Source: Rediff

== Women's tournament ==
Tournament
Tournament details
- Host country: India
- City: Hyderabad
- Dates: 23–30 October
- Teams: 8 (from 2 confederations)

Final positions
- Champions: India (1st title)
- Runner-up: South Africa
- Third place: South Korea

Tournament statistics
- Matches played: 20
- Goals scored: 90 (4.5 per match)
- Top scorer(s): (South Africa) Pietie Coetzee (South Africa) Susan Webber (8 goals)

=== Participating nations ===
- Kazakhstan
- India
- Ghana
- South Africa
- China
- Kenya
- South Korea
- Nigeria

=== Preliminary round ===
==== Pool A ====
Pos	Team	Pld	W	D	L	GF	GA	GD	Pts	Qualification
1	South Africa	3	3	0	0	21	1	+20	9	Semi-finals
2	India (H)	3	2	0	1	18	3	+15	6	Semi-finals
3	Kazakhstan	3	1	0	2	3	22	−19	3	
4	Ghana	3	0	0	3	1	17	−16	0	

Source: Rediff
Rules for classification: 1) points; 2) matches won; 3) goal difference; 4) goals for; 5) head-to-head result; 6) field goals scored.
(H) Hosts

23 October 2003
09:30

India	8–0	Ghana
Surajlata 19'; Sanggai 27'; Jasjeet 30'; An. Kerketta 50'; Surinder 58', 62'; Ad. Kerketta 64'; Sumrai 68'	Report

23 October 2003
14:00

Kazakhstan	0–12	South Africa
	Report	Webber 5', 30', 51', 55', 57'; Ross 17'; Wehmeyer 31', 45'; Bee 33', 39'; Coetzee 37', 59'

24 October 2003
09:30

South Africa	3–1	India
Coetzee 20', 25', 42'	Report	Suman 47'

24 October 2003
14:00

Kazakhstan	3–1	Ghana
Marchenko 13'; Imangaliyeva 44'; Podshivalova 70'	Report	Ramatu 58'

26 October 2003
16:00

South Africa	6–0	Ghana
Coetzee 10', 18'; Wilson 12'; Koornhof 30', 48'; Webber 66'	Report

26 October 2003
20:00

India	9–0	Kazakhstan
Sanggai 4', 40'; Masira 11'; Jyoti 32', 44', 67'; Ad. Kerketta 51', 62'; Surinder 62'	Report

==== Pool B ====
Pos	Team	Pld	W	D	L	GF	GA	GD	Pts	Qualification
1	South Korea	3	2	1	0	12	1	+11	7	Semi-finals
2	China	3	2	1	0	6	3	+3	7	Semi-finals
3	Kenya	3	1	0	2	3	8	−5	3	
4	Nigeria	3	0	0	3	2	11	−9	0	

Source: Rediff
Rules for classification: 1) points; 2) matches won; 3) goal difference; 4) goals for; 5) head-to-head result; 6) field goals scored.

23 October 2003
09:00

South Korea	5–0	Kenya
Kim Jin. 4'; Lee Y. 40'; Kim Je. 47', 58'; Sin 51'	Report

24 October 2003
09:00

Nigeria	0–6	South Korea
	Report	Kim Ji. 2'; Jeong 3', 9'; Sin 41'; Kim Je. 47'; Kim Jin. 52'

24 October 2003
11:30

China	2–1	Kenya
Yu 4'; Chen X. 20'	Report	Kimeu 1'

25 October 2003
10:30

China	3–1	Nigeria
He 3'; Yu 22'; Chen L. 35'	Report	Nkkireka 28'

26 October 2003
14:00

Nigeria	1–2	Kenya
Okoh 21'	Report	Kimeu 4', 54'

26 October 2003
18:00

South Korea	1–1	China
A 61'	Report	Cheng 66'

=== Classification round ===
==== Bracket ====
Crossover
28 October
Kazakhstan	2
Nigeria	0
28 October
Kenya	2
Ghana	1

Fifth place
39 October
Kazakhstan	1
Kenya	3
Seventh place
30 October
Nigeria	0
Ghana	5

==== Crossovers ====
28 October 2003
09:00

Kenya	2–1	Ghana
Wanyama 19'; Kiprotich 42'	Report	Ramatu 64'

28 October 2003
11:30

Kazakhstan	2–0	Nigeria
Imangaliyeva 31'; Mikhramova 38'	Report

==== Seventh and eighth place ====
30 October 2003
09:00

Nigeria	0–5	Ghana
	Report	Ramatu 4'; Darko 31', 40'; Dautey 43'; Sam 55'

==== Fifth and sixth place ====
30 October 2003
09:00

Kazakhstan	1–3	Kenya
Mutallyapova 37'	Report	Kimeu 50'; Mbulo 61'; Kiptiony 69'

=== Medal round ===
==== Bracket ====
Semi-finals
28 October
South Africa	4
China	0
28 October
South Korea	0
India	3

Final
39 October
South Africa	1 (3)
India (pen.)	1 (4)
Third place
30 October
China	0
South Korea	1

==== Semi-finals ====
28 October 2003
16:30

South Africa	4–0	China
Coetzee 3'; Webber 43', 53'; Bee 44'	Report

28 October 2003
19:00

South Korea	0–3	India
	Report	Surinder 35+'; Sanggai 38'; Jyoti 69'

==== Third and fourth place ====
30 October 2003
16:30

China	0–1	South Korea
	Report	Lee Y. 55'

==== Final ====
30 October 2003
19:00

South Africa	1–1	India
Wilson 40'	Report	Suman 52'
Penalties
	3–4

=== Final standings ===
Pos	Grp	Team	Pld	W	D	L	GF	GA	GD	Pts	Final result
1	A	India (H)	5	3	1	1	22	4	+18	10	Gold medal
2	A	South Africa	5	4	1	0	26	2	+24	13	Silver medal
3	B	South Korea	5	3	1	1	13	4	+9	10	Bronze medal
4	B	China	5	2	1	2	6	8	−2	7	
5	B	Kenya	5	3	0	2	8	10	−2	9	
6	A	Kazakhstan	5	2	0	3	6	25	−19	6	
7	A	Ghana	5	1	0	4	7	19	−12	3	
8	B	Nigeria	5	0	0	5	2	18	−16	0	

Source: Rediff
(H) Hosts

=== Goalscorers ===
There were 90 goals scored in 20 matches, for an average of 4.5 goals per match.

8 goals

- (South Africa) Pietie Coetzee
- (South Africa) Susan Webber

4 goals

- (India) Sanggai Chanu
- (India) Surinder Kaur
- (India) Jyoti Sunita Kullu
- (Kenya) Lilian Kimeu

3 goals

- (Ghana) Abass Ramatu
- (India) Adline Kerketta
- (South Africa) Kerry Bee
- (South Korea) Kim Jeong-eun

2 goals

- (China) Yu Yali
- (Ghana) Beatrice Darko
- (India) Suman Bala
- (Kazakhstan) Gulnara Imangaliyeva
- (South Africa) Johke Koornhof
- (South Africa) Sharne Wehmeyer
- (South Africa) Jennifer Wilson
- (South Korea) Jeong Jin-ok
- (South Korea) Kim Jin-ju
- (South Korea) Lee Yuon-hee
- (South Korea) Sin Byoung-ju

1 goal

- (China) Chen Lizhi
- (China) Chen Xiaoling
- (China) Cheng Jiayan
- (China) He Haiyain
- (Ghana) Victoria Dautey
- (Ghana) Georgina Sam
- (India) Surajlata Devi
- (India) Jasjeet Kaur Handa
- (India) Annarita Kerketta
- (India) Masira Surin
- (India) Sumrai Tete
- (Kazakhstan) Tatyana Marchenko
- (Kazakhstan) Olga Mikhramova
- (Kazakhstan) Ainura Mutallyapova
- (Kazakhstan) Natalya Podshivalova
- (Kenya) Hellen Kiprotich
- (Kenya) Benardette Kiptiony
- (Kenya) Rose Mbulo
- (Kenya) Priscah Wanyama
- (Nigeria) Matyan Nkkireka
- (Nigeria) Faith Okoh
- (South Africa) Bronwyn Ross
- (South Korea) A Rum-woo
- (South Korea) Kim Ji-eun

Source: Rediff
