= 1999 Women's Hockey International Challenge =

Women's International Challenge
Tournament details
- Host country: Australia
- Dates: 28 April–9 May
- Teams: 4 (from 3 confederations)
- Venue: 2 (in 2 host cities)

Final positions
- Champions: Australia (2nd title)
- Runner-up: South Africa
- Third place: India

Tournament statistics
- Matches played: 14
- Goals scored: 68 (4.86 per match)
- Top scorer: (Australia) Alyson Annan (10 goals)

The 1999 Women's Hockey International Challenge was a women's field hockey tournament, consisting of a series of test matches. It was held in Canberra and Perth, from 28 April to 9 May, 1999.

Australia won the tournament, defeating South Africa 5–0 in the final. India finished in third place after winning the third place match 4–3 in penalties, defeating South Korea.

== Competition format ==
The tournament featured the national teams of Australia, India, South Africa and South Korea. The teams competed in a double round-robin format, with each team playing each other twice. Three points were awarded for a win, one for a draw, and none for a loss.

== Officials ==
The following umpires were appointed by the International Hockey Federation to officiate the tournament:

- Judith Barnesby (AUS)
- Renée Cohen (NED)
- Marelize de Klerk (RSA)
- Lee Mi-Ok (KOR)
- Jane Nockolds (ENG)

== Results ==
=== Preliminary round ===
| Pos | Team | Pld | W | D | L | GF | GA | GD | Pts | Qualification |
|---|---|---|---|---|---|---|---|---|---|---|
| 1 | Australia (H) | 6 | 6 | 0 | 0 | 30 | 6 | +24 | 18 | Advanced to Final |
| 2 | South Africa | 6 | 4 | 0 | 2 | 16 | 12 | +4 | 12 | Advanced to Final |
| 3 | India | 6 | 1 | 0 | 5 | 9 | 21 | −12 | 3 | |
| 4 | South Korea | 6 | 1 | 0 | 5 | 4 | 20 | −16 | 3 | |

Source: Hockey Australia
Rules for classification: 1) points; 2) goal difference; 3) goals scored; 4) head-to-head result.
(H) Hosts

==== Fixtures ====
28 April 1999
18:00 (AEST)

| South Korea | 0–1 | South Africa |
|---|---|---|
| | Report | Coetzee 13' |

National Hockey Centre, Canberra
Umpires:
Renée Cohen (NED)
Judith Barnesby (AUS)

28 April 1999
20:00 (AEST)

| Australia | 5–1 | India |
|---|---|---|
| Langham 24', 60'; Annan 30', 46'; Andrews 47' | Report | Sita 37' |

National Hockey Centre, Canberra
Umpires:
Marelize de Klerk (RSA)
Jane Nockolds (ENG)

30 April 1999
14:00 (AEST)

| South Korea | 0–8 | Australia |
|---|---|---|
| | Report | Andrews 5', 8'; Langham 14'; Annan 55', 56'; Powell 60'; J. Towers 66', 70' |

National Hockey Centre, Canberra
Umpires:
Marelize de Klerk (RSA)
Renée Cohen (NED)

30 April 1999
16:00 (AEST)

| South Africa | 3–1 | India |
|---|---|---|
| Bentley 19'; Coetzee 36', 68' | Report | Papki 25' |

National Hockey Centre, Canberra
Umpires:
Jane Nockolds (ENG)
Lee Mi-Ok (KOR)

1 May 1999
14:00 (AEST)

| India | 3–1 | South Korea |
|---|---|---|
| Neha 13'; Pritam 19'; Manjinder 58' | Report | Oh 70' |

National Hockey Centre, Canberra
Umpires:
Jane Nockolds (ENG)
Judith Barnesby (AUS)

1 May 1999
16:00 (AEST)

| Australia | 5–3 | South Africa |
|---|---|---|
| Langham 5', 32'; Annan 8', 40'; Ringrose 45' | Report | Coetzee 11', 35'; Geyser 54' |

National Hockey Centre, Canberra
Umpires:
Lee Mi-Ok (KOR)
Renée Cohen (NED)

5 May 1999
18:00 (AWST)

| Australia | 4–0 | South Korea |
|---|---|---|
| Powell 1'; Mitchell-Taverner 6'; Dobson 12'; Annan 59' | Report |

Perth Hockey Stadium, Perth
Umpires:
Renée Cohen (NED)
Marelize de Klerk (RSA)

5 May 1999
20:00 (AWST)

| India | 2–5 | South Africa |
|---|---|---|
| Subite 4'; Suraj 54' | Report | Coetzee 2'; Bee 33'; Van Schalkwyk 53'; Wessels 62'; Bentley 65' |

Perth Hockey Stadium, Perth
Umpires:
Judith Barnesby (AUS)
Lee Mi-Ok (KOR)

6 May 1999
18:00 (AWST)

| South Africa | 1–3 | Australia |
|---|---|---|
| Dare 64' | Report | Andrews 16', 51'; Powell 59' |

Perth Hockey Stadium, Perth
Umpires:
Jane Nockolds (ENG)
Lee Mi-Ok (KOR)

6 May 1999
20:00 (AWST)

| South Korea | 2–1 | India |
|---|---|---|
| Lee E. 4'; Kim E. 52' | Report | Suraj 6' |

Perth Hockey Stadium, Perth
Umpires:
Marelize de Klerk (RSA)
Judith Barnesby (AUS)

8 May 1999
14:00 (AWST)

| India | 1–5 | Australia |
|---|---|---|
| Pritam 8' | Report | Langham 5', 34'; K. Towers 16'; J. Towers 53'; Annan 68' |

Perth Hockey Stadium, Perth
Umpires:
Lee Mi-Ok (KOR)
Marelize de Klerk (RSA)

8 May 1999
16:00 (AWST)

| South Africa | 3–1 | South Korea |
|---|---|---|
| Bee 14'; Bentley 52'; Coetzee 64' | Report | Park E. 17' |

Perth Hockey Stadium, Perth
Umpires:
Renée Cohen (NED)
Judith Barnesby (AUS)

=== Classification round ===
==== Third and fourth place ====
9 May 1999
14:00 (AWST)

| India | 2–2 | South Korea |
|---|---|---|
| Papki 35'; Pritam 60' | Report | Kim E. 35', 38' |
Penalties
| Sandeep (penalty shoot-out scored); Suraj (penalty shoot-out scored); Jyoti (penalty shoot-out scored); Sita (penalty shoot-out scored) | 4–3 | (penalty shoot-out scored) Cho; (penalty shoot-out scored) Oh; (penalty shoot-out missed) Kim E. (penalty shoot-out scored) Park H. (penalty shoot-out missed) Lee E. |

Perth Hockey Stadium, Perth
Umpires:
Judith Barnesby (AUS)
Marelize de Klerk (RSA)

==== Final ====
9 May 1999
16:30 (AWST)

| Australia | 5–0 | South Africa |
|---|---|---|
| J. Towers 15'; Annan 34', 51'; Andrews 55', 70' | Report |

Perth Hockey Stadium, Perth
Umpires:
Jane Nockolds (ENG)
Renée Cohen (NED)

== Statistics ==
=== Final standings ===
| Pos | Team | Pld | W | D | L | GF | GA | GD | Pts | Status |
|---|---|---|---|---|---|---|---|---|---|---|
| 1st place, gold medalist(s) | Australia | 7 | 7 | 0 | 0 | 35 | 6 | +29 | 21 | Tournament Champion |
| 2nd place, silver medalist(s) | South Africa | 7 | 4 | 0 | 3 | 16 | 17 | −1 | 12 | |
| 3rd place, bronze medalist(s) | India | 7 | 1 | 1 | 5 | 11 | 23 | −12 | 4 | |
| 4 | South Korea | 7 | 1 | 1 | 5 | 6 | 22 | −16 | 4 | |

Source: Hockey Australia

=== Goalscorers ===
There were 68 goals scored in 14 matches, for an average of 4.86 goals per match.

10 goals

- (Australia) Alyson Annan

7 goals

- (Australia) Michelle Andrews
- (Australia) Bianca Langham
- (South Africa) Pietie Coetzee

4 goals

- (Australia) Julie Towers

3 goals

- (Australia) Katrina Powell
- (India) Pritam Rani Siwach
- (South Africa) Caryn Bentley
- (South Korea) Kim Eun-Jin

2 goals

- (India) Papki Devi
- (India) Suraj Lata Devi
- (South Africa) Kerry Bee

1 goal

- (Australia) Louise Dobson
- (Australia) Claire Mitchell-Taverner
- (Australia) Candice Ringrose
- (Australia) Kristen Towers
- (India) Dubite Dalal
- (India) Sita Gussain
- (India) Manjinder Kaur
- (India) Neha Singh
- (South Africa) Alison Dare
- (South Africa) Jacqueline Geyser
- (South Africa) Abigail van Schalkwyk
- (South Africa) Susan Wessels
- (South Korea) Park Eun-Kyung
- (South Korea) Lee Eun-Young
- (South Korea) Oh Ko-Woon
