= 1998 Women's Hockey World Cup =

Field hockey tournament

1998 Hockey World Cup
Tournament details
- Host country: Netherlands
- City: Utrecht
- Dates: 20–31 May
- Teams: 12
- Venue: Galgenwaard Stadium

Final positions
- Champions: Australia (2nd title)
- Runner-up: Netherlands
- Third place: Germany

Tournament statistics
- Matches played: 42
- Goals scored: 184 (4.38 per match)
- Top scorer: (Australia) Alyson Annan (8 goals)
- Best player: (Australia) Alyson Annan

The 1998 Women's Hockey World Cup was the ninth edition of the Women's Hockey World Cup field hockey tournament. It was held from 20 to 31 May 1998 in Utrecht, Netherlands alongside the men's tournament. Australia won its second world title after defeating Netherlands 3–2 in the final. The tournament was staged on two artificial pitches at the complex of Dutch football club FC Utrecht.

== Umpires ==
- Jean Buchanan (RSA)
- Peri Buckley (AUS)
- Renée Chatas (USA)
- Gill Clarke (ENG)
- Renée Cohen (NED)
- Ute Conen (GER)
- Laura Crespo (ARG)
- Lyn Farrell (NZL)
- Hu Youfang (CHN)
- Noami Kato (JPN)
- Angela Lario (ESP)
- Lee Mi-ok (KOR)
- Jane Nockolds (ENG)
- Gina Spitaleri (ITA)
- Miriam van Gemert (NED)
- Kazuko Yasueda (JPN)

== Results ==
=== Pool A ===
Pos	Team	Pld	W	D	L	GF	GA	GD	Pts	Qualification
1	Australia	5	5	0	0	26	4	+22	15	Semi-finals
2	Germany	5	4	0	1	13	8	+5	12	Semi-finals
3	South Africa	5	2	0	3	11	14	−3	6	
4	United States	5	2	0	3	9	14	−5	6	
5	Scotland	5	2	0	3	6	11	−5	6	
6	China	5	0	0	5	4	18	−14	0	

Source: FIH
Rules for classification: 1) points; 2) goal difference; 3) goals scored; 4) head-to-head result.

20 May 1998
12:35

Scotland	0–5	Australia
	Report	Langham 18'; Towers 24'; K. Powell 45', 65'; Annan 48'

Umpires:
Lee Mi-ok (KOR)
Jane Nockolds (ENG)

20 May 1998
16:05

South Africa	2–1	China
Coetzee 6', 50'	Report	Tang 70'

Umpires:
Miriam van Gemert (NED)
Laura Crespo (ARG)

20 May 1998
20:05

Germany	5–1	United States
Becker 29'; Keller 32'; Reiter 35'; Ernsting-Krienke 39'; Möller 67'	Report	Lucas 46'

Umpires:
Gill Clarke (ENG)
Lynn Farrell (NZL)

22 May 1998
12:35

Germany	4–3	South Africa
Keller 2', 41'; Ernsting-Krienke 5'; Lätzsch 32'	Report	Cormack 12'; Coetzee 30'; Dare 33'

Umpires:
Renée Cohen (NED)
Jane Nockolds (ENG)

22 May 1998
13:35

United States	2–1	Scotland
Barber 2'; Fuchs 41'	Report	MacDonald 56'

Umpires:
Naomi Kato (JPN)
Laura Crespo (ARG)

22 May 1998
15:05

Australia	7–1	China
Annan 5', 56'; Towers 16', 23', 70'; Langham 24'; Mitchell-Taverner 50'	Report	Tang 65'

Umpires:
Gill Clarke (ENG)
Miriam van Gemert (NED)

24 May 1998
11:05

Australia	6–1	United States
Smith 29'; Towers 30'; Langham 32'; Michelle-Taverner 36'; Annan 56'; Mott 57'	Report	Vizzuso 43'

Umpires:
Renée Cohen (NED)
Laura Crespo (ARG)

24 May 1998
12:05

China	1–3	Germany
Juan 27'	Report	Kauschke 16'; Klecker 65', 68'

Umpires:
Lee Mi-ok (KOR)
Angela Lario (ESP)

24 May 1998
14:35

South Africa	2–3	Scotland
Coetzee 39', 48'	Report	Gilmour 7'; MacDonald 18', 40'

Umpires:
Lyn Farrell (NZL)
Miriam van Gemert (NED)

26 May 1998
12:35

Scotland	2–1	China
Fraser 16'; MacDonald 53'	Report	Chen Z. 35'

Umpires:
Lyn Farrell (NZL)
Renée Cohen (NED)

26 May 1998
13:35

United States	1–2	South Africa
Lucas 38'	Report	Coetzee 35', 46'

Umpires:
Lee Mi-ok (KOR)
Miriam van Gemert (NED)

26 May 1998
15:05

Germany	0–3	Australia
	Report	Langham 21'; Starre 46'; Annan 66'

Umpires:
Gill Clarke (ENG)
Jane Nockolds (ENG)

27 May 1998
13:35

China	0–4	United States
	Report	James 18', 21', 42', 54'

Umpires:
Jane Nockolds (ENG)
Kazuko Yasueda (JPN)

27 May 1998
17:35

Australia	5–2	South Africa
K. Powell 6'; Langham 29'; Mott 31', 67'; Hawkes 56'	Report	Agliotti 43'; Wessels 62'

Umpires:
Hu Youfang (CHN)
Gina Spitaleri (ITA)

27 May 1998
18:35

Scotland	0–1	Germany
	Report	Keller 27'

Umpires:
Lee Mi-ok (KOR)
Laura Crespo (ARG)

=== Pool B ===
Pos	Team	Pld	W	D	L	GF	GA	GD	Pts	Qualification
1	Netherlands	5	4	1	0	13	5	+8	13	Semi-finals
2	Argentina	5	4	1	0	12	7	+5	13	Semi-finals
3	South Korea	5	3	0	2	13	11	+2	9	
4	New Zealand	5	2	0	3	10	11	−1	6	
5	England	5	1	0	4	8	12	−4	3	
6	India	5	0	0	5	4	14	−10	0	

Source: FIH
Rules for classification: 1) points; 2) goal difference; 3) goals scored; 4) head-to-head result.

20 May 1998
13:35

India	0–1	England
	Report	Wright 19'

Umpires:
Renée Chatas (USA)
Ute Conen (GER)

20 May 1998
15:05

South Korea	1–2	Argentina
Choi Kw. 14'	Report	Oneto 18'; Gulla 35'

Umpires:
Gina Spitaleri (ITA)
Renée Cohen (NED)

20 May 1998
17:35

Netherlands	2–1	New Zealand
Thate 32'; Van der Wielen 57'	Report	Bell-Kake 13'

Umpires:
Kazuko Yasueda (JPN)
Peri Buckley (AUS)

21 May 1998
15:05

England	2–3	Netherlands
Wright 18'; Miller 29'	Report	Van den Boogaard 20', 63'; Deiters 67'

Umpires:
Naomi Kato (JPN)
Gina Spitaleri (ITA)

21 May 1998
16:05

Argentina	2–1	India
Pando 28'; MacKenzie 52'	Report	Sandeep 16'

Umpires:
Hu Youfang (CHN)
Peri Buckley (AUS)

21 May 1998
18:35

South Korea	5–4	New Zealand
Choi M. 54'; Kim M. 56'; Kim E. 62'; Kim S. 63'; Lee E. 69'	Report	Smith 1'; Pearce 9'; Lawrence 16'; Matthews 39'

Umpires:
Angela Lario (ESP)
Jean Buchanan (RSA)

23 May 1998
11:05

New Zealand	2–1	India
Bell-Kake 8', 15'	Report	Manjinder 41'

Umpires:
Kazuko Yasueda (JPN)
Hu Youfang (CHN)

23 May 1998
12:05

England	2–4	Argentina
Miller 5'; Sixsmith 43'	Report	Rognoni 28', 30'; MacKenzie 63'; Aymar 66'

Umpires:
Renée Chatas (USA)
Jean Buchanan (RSA)

23 May 1998
16:05

Netherlands	1–0	South Korea
Van de Kieft 52'	Report

Umpires:
Angela Lario (ESP)
Ute Conen (GER)

25 May 1998
12:35

England	2–3	South Korea
Miller 7', 52'	Report	Kim M. 15'; Lee E. 29'; Woo 42'

Umpires:
Peri Buckley (AUS)
Kazuko Yasueda (JPN)

25 May 1998
13:35

Argentina	2–1	New Zealand
MacKenzie 48'; Rognoni 65'	Report	Smith 20'

Umpires:
Ute Conen (GER)
Gina Spitaleri (ITA)

25 May 1998
20:05

Netherlands	5–0	India
Boomgaardt 9'; Deiters 25'; Thate 28', 36'; Smabers 38'	Report

Umpires:
Renée Chatas (USA)
Naomi Kato (JPN)

27 May 1998
11:35

New Zealand	2–1	England
Senior 21'; Smith 25'	Report	Wright 67'

Umpires:
Naomi Kato (JPN)
Angela Lario (ESP)

27 May 1998
16:05

India	2–4	South Korea
Pritam 49', 68'	Report	Lee E. 6'; Choi Kw. 32'; Woo 57', 62'

Umpires:
Jean Buchanan (RSA)
Ute Conen (GER)

27 May 1998
20:05

Argentina	2–2	Netherlands
Masotta 55'; Oneto 61'	Report	Van de Kieft 32'; Thate 39'

Umpires:
Peri Buckley (AUS)
Gill Clarke (ENG)

=== Ninth to twelfth place classification ===
Crossover
29 May 1998
Scotland	5
India	3
29 May 1998
China	0
England	3

Ninth place
30 May 1998
Scotland	0
England	2
Eleventh place
30 May 1998
India	2
China	4

==== Crossover ====
29 May 1998
13:35

Scotland	5–3	India
Gilmour 20'; Robertson 24'; MacDonald 39'; Grant 54'; Simpson 63'	Report	Bala 10'; Tirkey 46'; Manjinder 66'

Umpires:
Naomi Kato (JPN)
Jean Buchanan (RSA)

29 May 1998
16:05

China	0–3	England
	Report	Sixsmith 14', 57'; Miller 30'

Umpires:
Renée Chatas (USA)
Lyn Farrell (NZL)

==== Eleventh and twelfth place ====
30 May 1998
15:05

India	2–4	China
Jyoti 9'; Surja 59'	Report	Huang 17'; Juan 19'; Liu 26'; Wang 32'

Umpires:
Ute Conen (GER)
Lyn Farrell (NZL)

==== Ninth and tenth place ====
30 May 1998
17:35

Scotland	0–2	England
	Report	Sixsmith 15'; Smith 29'

Umpires:
Peri Buckley (AUS)
Lee Mi-ok (KOR)

=== Fifth to eighth place classification ===
Crossover
29 May 1998
United States	0
South Korea	2
29 May 1998
South Africa	1
New Zealand	3

Fifth place
30 May 1998
South Korea	4
New Zealand	3
Seventh place
30 May 1998
United States	2 (2)
South Africa (p.s.o)	2 (4)

==== Crossover ====
29 May 1998
12:35

South Africa	1–3	New Zealand
Bee 61'	Report	Pearce 11'; Bell-Kake 49'; Lawrence 59'

Umpires:
Renée Cohen (NED)
Ute Conen (GER)

29 May 1998
15:05

United States	0–2	South Korea
	Report	Choi M. 4'; Oh 33'

Umpires:
Jane Nockolds (ENG)
Peri Buckley (AUS)

==== Seventh and eighth place ====
30 May 1998
12:35

United States	0–0 (a.e.t.)	South Africa
	Report
Penalties
Fuchs (penalty shoot-out scored); Lucas (penalty shoot-out scored); Fillat (penalty shoot-out missed); James (penalty shoot-out missed)	2–4	(penalty shoot-out scored) Coetzee; (penalty shoot-out scored) MacNaughton; (penalty shoot-out scored) Wessels; (penalty shoot-out scored) Dobson

Umpires:
Laura Crespo (ARG)
Jane Nockolds (ENG)

==== Fifth and sixth place ====
30 May 1998
11:05

South Korea	4–3	New Zealand
Woo 15'; Oh 30'; Lee E. 35'; Choi M. 59'	Report	Smith 4'; Foy 13'; Matthews 55'

Umpires:
Renée Chatas (USA)
Gina Spitaleri (ITA)

=== First to fourth place classification ===
Semi-finals
29 May 1998
Australia	4
Argentina	2
29 May 1998
Germany	1
Netherlands	6

Final
31 May 1998
Australia	3
Netherlands	2
Third place
31 May 1998
Germany	3
Argentina	2

==== Semi-finals ====
29 May 1998
17:35

Australia	4–2	Argentina
Annan 4', 51'; Langham 9'; Powell 56'	Report	Masotta 37'; MacKenzie 65'

Umpires:
Angela Lario (ESP)
Miriam van Gemert (NED)

29 May 1998
20:05

Germany	1–6	Netherlands
Lätzsch 23'	Report	Thate 5', 45'; Van den Boogaard 17', 32'; Donners 46'; Teeuwen 70'

Umpires:
Gill Clarke (ENG)
Kazuko Yasueda (JPN)

==== Third and fourth place ====
31 May 1998
13:35

Germany	3–2	Argentina
Kauschke 39'; Dickenscheid 51'; Möller 62'	Report	Oneto 34', 55'

Umpires:
Renée Cohen (NED)
Angela Lario (ESP)

==== Final ====
31 May 1998
16:05

Netherlands	2–3	Australia
Kuipers 1'; Deiters 62'	Report	Annan 22'; Towers 24'; Langham 56'

Umpires:
Gill Clarke (ENG)
Kazuko Yasueda (JPN)

== Awards ==
Player of the Tournament	Top Goalscorer	Goalkeeper of the Tournament	Most Sportive Player	Fair Play Trophy
(Australia) Alyson Annan	(Australia) Alyson Annan	(Argentina) Laura Mulhall	(New Zealand) Mandy Smith	Scotland

== Statistics ==
=== Final standings ===
Pos	Grp	Team	Pld	W	D	L	GF	GA	GD	Pts	Final result
1	A	Australia	7	7	0	0	33	8	+25	21	Gold medal
2	B	Netherlands	7	5	1	1	21	9	+12	16	Silver medal
3	A	Germany	7	5	0	2	17	16	+1	15	Bronze medal
4	B	Argentina	7	4	1	2	16	14	+2	13	Fourth place
5	B	South Korea	7	5	0	2	19	14	+5	15	Eliminated in group stage
6	B	New Zealand	7	3	0	4	16	16	0	9	Eliminated in group stage
7	A	South Africa	7	2	1	4	12	17	−5	7	Eliminated in group stage
8	A	United States	7	2	1	4	9	16	−7	7	Eliminated in group stage
9	B	England	7	3	0	4	13	12	+1	9	Eliminated in group stage
10	A	Scotland	7	3	0	4	11	16	−5	9	Eliminated in group stage
11	A	China	7	1	0	6	8	23	−15	3	Eliminated in group stage
12	B	India	7	0	0	7	9	23	−14	0	Eliminated in group stage

Source: FIH

=== Goalscorers ===
There were 184 goals scored in 42 matches, for an average of 4.38 goals per match.

8 goals

- (Australia) Alyson Annan

7 goals

- (Australia) Bianca Langham
- (South Africa) Pietie Coetzee

6 goals

- (Australia) Julie Towers
- (Netherlands) Carole Thate

5 goals

- (England) Purdy Miller
- (Scotland) Sue MacDonald

4 goals

- (Argentina) Sofía MacKenzie
- (Argentina) Vanina Oneto
- (Australia) Katrina Powell
- (England) Jane Sixsmith
- (Germany) Natascha Keller
- (Netherlands) Dillianne van den Boogaard
- (New Zealand) Tina Bell-Kake
- (New Zealand) Mandy Smith
- (South Korea) Lee Eun-Young
- (South Korea) Woo Hyun-Jung
- (United States) Kelli James

3 goals

- (Argentina) Cecilia Rognoni
- (Australia) Nikki Mott
- (England) Lucilla Wright
- (Netherlands) Julie Deiters
- (South Korea) Choi Mi-Soon

2 goals

- (Argentina) Karina Masotta
- (Australia) Claire Mitchell-Taverner
- (China) Tang Chunling
- (China) Juan Li
- (Germany) Nadine Ernsting-Krienke
- (Germany) Katrin Kauschke
- (Germany) Denise Klecker
- (Germany) Heike Lätzsch
- (Germany) Inga Möller
- (India) Manjinder Kaur
- (India) Pritam Rani
- (Netherlands) Fleur van de Kieft
- (New Zealand) Anna Lawrence
- (New Zealand) Robyn Matthews
- (New Zealand) Suzie Pearce
- (Scotland) Susan Gilmour
- (South Korea) Choi Kwan-Sook
- (South Korea) Kim Myung-Ok
- (South Korea) Oh Seung-Shin
- (United States) Antoinette Lucas

1 goal

- (Argentina) Luciana Aymar
- (Argentina) Alejandra Gulla
- (Argentina) Gabriela Pando
- (Australia) Rechelle Hawkes
- (Australia) Karen Smith
- (Australia) Kate Starre
- (China) Wang Jiuyan
- (China) Huang Junxia
- (China) Liu Lijie
- (China) Chen Zhaoxia
- (England) Jane Smith
- (Germany) Britta Becker
- (Germany) Tanja Dickenscheid
- (Germany) Cornelia Reiter
- (India) Shashi Bala
- (India) Surja Devi
- (India) Sandeep Kaur
- (India) Jyoti Sunita Kullu
- (India) Mary Tirkey
- (Netherlands) Ageeth Boomgaardt
- (Netherlands) Mijntje Donners
- (Netherlands) Ellen Kuipers
- (Netherlands) Hanneke Smabers
- (Netherlands) Margje Teeuwen
- (Netherlands) Suzan van der Wielen
- (New Zealand) Kylie Foy
- (New Zealand) Moira Senior
- (Scotland) Susan Fraser
- (Scotland) Alison Grant
- (Scotland) Pauline Robertson
- (Scotland) Rhona Simpson
- (South Africa) Marilyn Agliotti
- (South Africa) Kerry Bee
- (South Africa) Sharon Cormack
- (South Africa) Alison Dare
- (South Africa) Susan Wessels
- (South Korea) Kim Eun-Jin
- (South Korea) Kim Soo-Jung
- (United States) Kate Barber
- (United States) Tracey Fuchs
- (United States) Michelle Vizzuso

Source: FIH
