= Amanda Gonzalez =

Amanda Gonzalez may refer to:

- Amanda González (born 1979), Spanish field hockey player
- Amanda Gonzalez (politician) (born 1984/1985), American politician from Colorado

== See also ==
- Mandy Gonzalez (born 1978), American actress and singer
