= Castelijn =

Castelijn or Castelijns is a Dutch surname. Notable people with the surname include:

- Boudewijn Castelijn (fl. 1988–1998), Dutch field hockey coach and trainer
- Twan Castelijns (born 1989), Dutch cyclist
