= Laura Mulhall =

Argentine field hockey player

Personal information
- Born: November 30, 1957 (age 68)
Medal record
Women's field hockey
Representing Argentina
Pan American Games
Gold medal – first place	1987 Indianapolis	Team
Gold medal – first place	1991 Havana	Team

Laura Estela Mulhall (born November 30, 1957) is an Argentine former field hockey goalkeeper, who played more than hundred international matches for the Women's National Team. She was a member of the team that finished in seventh place at the 1988 Summer Olympics in Seoul, South Korea. At the age of 40 she competed in her last international tournament, the 1998 Women's Hockey World Cup. Mulhall was succeeded by Mariela Antoniska.
