= Sanggai Chanu =

Indian field hockey player

Personal information
- Full name: Sanggai Ibemhal Chanu Maimom
- Born: 3 January 1981 (age 45) Bashikong, Manipur, India
Medal record
Women's field hockey
Representing India
Commonwealth Games
Gold medal – first place	2002 Manchester	Team
Silver medal – second place	2006 Melbourne	Team
Asia Cup
Gold medal – first place	2004 New Delhi
Champions Challenge
Bronze medal – third place	2002 Johannesburg	Team

Sanggai Ibemhal Chanu Maimom (born 3 January 1981 in Bashikong, near Imphal, Manipur) is an Indian former field hockey player from Manipur. She made her international debut for India in April 1998 in a friendly against Germany (0–2). She played as a midfielder or as a centre forward. At the 2001 World Cup Qualifier she was named Young Player of the Tournament.

== International senior tournaments ==
- 1998 – World Cup, Utrecht (12th)
- 1998 – Commonwealth Games, Kuala Lumpur (4th)
- 2001 – World Cup Qualifier, Amiens/Abbeville (7th)
- 2002 – Champions Challenge, Johannesburg (3rd)
- 2002 – Commonwealth Games, Manchester (1st)
- 2002 – Asian Games, Busan (4th)
- 2003 – Field hockey at the 2003 Afro-Asian Games, Hyderabad (1st)
- 2004 – Asia Cup, New Delhi (1st)
- 2006 – Commonwealth Games, Melbourne (2nd)
- 2006 – World Cup, Madrid (11th)
