= Laura Maiztegui =

Argentine field hockey player

Personal information
- Born: September 21, 1978 (age 47)
Medal record
Women's field hockey
Representing Argentina
Olympic Games
Silver medal – second place	2000 Sydney	Team
Champions Trophy
Gold medal – first place	2001 Amstelveen
Silver medal – second place	2002 Macau
Pan American Cup
Gold medal – first place	2001 Kingston

Laura Maiztegui (born September 21, 1978) is a field hockey player from Argentina, who won the silver medal with the national women's hockey team at the 2000 Summer Olympics in Sydney.
