= Emile Smith =

South African field hockey player

Emile Smith (born 27 September 1977) is a South African former field hockey player who competed in the 2004 Summer Olympics and in the 2008 Summer Olympics.
