= Belal Enaba =

Egyptian field hockey player

Personal information
- Nationality: Egyptian
- Born: 17 February 1973 (age 53)

Sport
- Sport: Field hockey

Belal Enaba (born 17 February 1973) is an Egyptian former field hockey player. He competed in the men's tournament at the 2004 Summer Olympics.
