= Wang Jiyuan =

Chinese artist (1893–1975)

- 王濟遠
- Born: 1893; Wujin, Jiangsu, Qing dynasty China
- Died: 1975 (aged 81-82); New York City, USA
- Other name: 寥東閣主人
- Education: Shanghai College of Art
- Known for: Co-Founder of Tian-Ma Society, Yiyuan Painting Institute 艺苑绘画研究所, Juelan Society
- Notable work: Orchids 花歌葉舞圖 (painting); Fruit (painting)
Wang Jiyuan
- Traditional Chinese: 王濟遠
Transcriptions

Wang Jiyuan was a Chinese artist. He co-founded the Juelan Society along with Ni Yide, Pang Xunqin, Chen Cheng-po, and others. Juelan members promoted innovation in the Chinese arts under the motto “fierce passion, firm rationality”

== Biography ==
Wang Jiyuan (literary name was the “Owner of Liao Dong Ge”) was born and raised in Wujin, Jiangsu. He studied at Jiangsu Second Normal School before entering the Shanghai College of Art (later changed to Shanghai Fine Arts School) in 1913. A year after graduating, he worked at his alma mater and eventually became director of the Western Painting Division at the Shanghai Fine Arts School.

Wang Jiyuan was good at composing watercolor works in both the Western and Chinese style, with an emphasis on plein air. He was active in the Shanghai art circles in his early years, but also traveled to Europe and Japan to study. He was very enthusiastic about the Western painting movement in modern China throughout his career.

In 1918, along with fellow art teachers Liu Haisu and Wang Yachen, Mr. Wang co-founded the Tian-Ma Society to advocate the ideas of modern art. In 1928, he founded another organization, the Yiyuan Painting Institute (simplified as Yiyuan). Members of this institution included experienced students who had studied abroad, such as Zhu Qizhan, Pan Yuliang, and Chen Cheng-po, and provided these young artists with opportunities to further their art studies. In 1932, Wang co-founded the Juelan Society along with Ni Yide, Pang Xunqin, Chen Cheng-po, and others. Juelan members promoted innovation in the Chinese arts under the motto “fierce passion, firm rationality”.

In addition to his creative activities, Wang taught Chinese painting, and also contributed to middle school art textbooks, including Watercolor Painting and Fundamentals of Western Painting Technique (this book was written in collaboration with Ni Yide).

In May 1936, Wang traveled from Guangzhou to Nanning through Guangxi on a sketching trip that lasted about 20 days. He produced more than 100 sketches and 63 written pieces during the journey, documenting his artistic experiences in the region. He also held a solo painting exhibition that attracted public attention. Later, he compiled selected works from the trip into Jiyuan's Ink Paintings, Volume II: Guilin Landscapes.

In 1941, Wang settled in the United States.He returned to Taiwan later as an overseas Chinese and hosted an exhibition there. In New York, Wang founded the Huabi Calligraphy and Painting Academy, where he promoted Chinese ink painting, watercolor painting, and calligraphy. During the 1960s, the academy collaborated with American art institutions to organize exhibitions and promote Chinese art.

In 1966, Wang created Magnolia (collection no. 31794), a work on paper depicting red magnolia blossoms against green foliage. According to the National Museum of History in Taiwan, the painting combines the use of multiple watercolor pigments with East Asian ink-wash techniques. In 1971, Wang participated in a joint exhibition with Zhang Daqian, with each artist presenting 15 works. The exhibition was arranged through the Smithsonian Institution and formed part of efforts to introduce Chinese art to American audiences. In 1973, Wang donated works to Taiwan's National Museum of History and the National Palace Museum. The National Museum of History subsequently incorporated a group of 50 modern paintings and calligraphy works donated by the artist into its collection in 1974.

Later in life, Wang donated his works to notable collections, such as Taiwan's National Palace Museum and the National Museum of History. In 1975, Wang Jiyuan died of illness in New York. Four years later, his family members brought the ashes of Mr. and Mrs. Wang back to Taiwan. A sea burial ceremony was held by the military, and their ashes were scattered in the ocean off the shores of Keelung.

== Academic journal articles ==
1. Gao, Yingxia. (2024). "From the Tian-Ma Society to the Chinese and Japanese Art Worlds: Focusing on the Interactions between Ishii Hakutei, Wang Jiyuan, and Others in the Early Twentieth Century." Journal of Hubei Institute of Fine Arts, no.3, pp.106–115.
2. Li, Yongqiang, and Xiong Wei. (2025). "Wang Jiyuan’s Journey to Guangxi in 1936 and His Landscape Paintings of Guilin". Art Magazine (Meishu), no.12.
