= Denise Klecker =

German field hockey player

Personal information
- Born: 26 January 1972 (age 54) Mainz, Rhineland-Palatinate
- Height: 172 cm (5 ft 8 in)
- Weight: 71 kg (157 lb)

Sport
- Sport: Field hockey
Medal record
Women's field hockey
Representing Germany
Olympic Games
Gold medal – first place	2004 Athens	Team competition
World Cup
Bronze medal – third place	1998 Utrecht	Team competition
Champions Trophy
Silver medal – second place	1997 Berlin	Team competition
Silver medal – second place	2000 Amstelveen	Team competition
Champions Challenge
Gold medal – first place	2003 Catania	Team competition
European Nations Cup
Silver medal – second place	1999 Cologne	Team competition
Bronze medal – third place	1995 Amstelveen	Team competition

Denise Rutschmann (née Klecker, born 26 January 1972 in Mainz, Rhineland-Palatinate) is a retired female field hockey defender from Germany, who won the gold medal with the German National Women's Team at the 2004 Summer Olympics in Athens, Greece. She is renowned as specialist for penalty corner shooting.

== International senior tournaments ==
- 1995 – European Nations Cup, Amstelveen (3rd place)
- 1995 – Champions Trophy, Mar del Plata (4th place)
- 1995 – Olympic Qualifying Tournament, Cape Town (3rd place)
- 1997 – Champions Trophy, Berlin (2nd place)
- 1998 – Indoor European Nations Cup, Orense (1st place)
- 1998 – World Cup, Utrecht (3rd place)
- 1999 – European Nations Cup, Cologne (2nd place)
- 2000 – Olympic Qualifying Tournament, Milton Keynes (3rd place)
- 2000 – Champions Trophy, Amstelveen (2nd place)
- 2000 – Summer Olympics, Sydney (7th place)
- 2002 – Indoor European Nations Cup, France (1st place)
- 2002 – World Cup, Perth (7th place)
- 2003 – Indoor World Cup, Leipzig (1st place)
- 2003 – Champions Challenge, Catania (1st place)
- 2003 – European Nations Cup, Barcelona (3rd place)
- 2004 – Summer Olympics, Athens (1st place)
