= Kerry Thompson-Moore =

English field hockey player

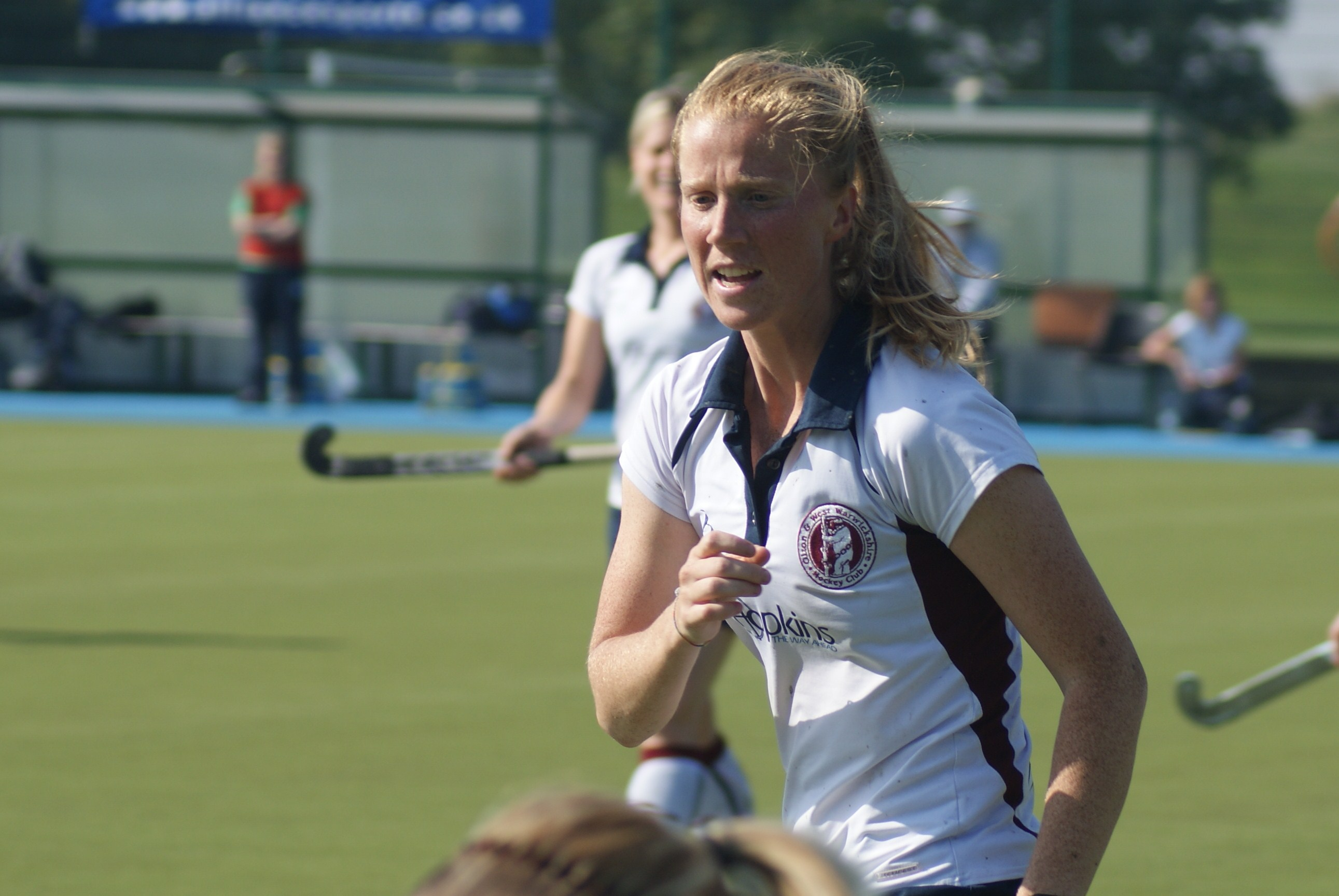
- Kerry Thompson-Moore in 2008

Personal information
- Nationality: English
- Born: October 1978 (age 47) Berkshire
- Spouse: Simon Thompson
- Children: Max Thompson-Moore, Grace Thompson-Moore

Sport
- Sport: Field Hockey
- Club: Olton & West Warwickshire
Medal record
field hockey
Representing England
Commonwealth Games
Silver medal – second place	1998 Kuala Lumpur	Team

Kerry Thompson-Moore is a female former English field hockey player. She was a member of the England women's national field hockey team from 1997 to 2005.

She represented England and won a silver medal, at the 1998 Commonwealth Games in Kuala Lumpur. She also competed at the 1998 Women's Hockey World Cup.
