= Anabel Gambero =

Argentine field hockey player

Personal information
- Full name: Anabel Gambero Erdozain
- Born: July 9, 1972 (age 53)
Medal record
Women's field hockey
Representing Argentina
Olympic Games
Silver medal – second place	2000 Sydney	Team
World Cup
Silver medal – second place	1994 Dublin	Team
Pan American Games
Gold medal – first place	1991 Havana	Team
Gold medal – first place	1995 Mar del Plata	Team
Gold medal – first place	1999 Winnipeg	Team
Champions Trophy
Gold medal – first place	2001 Amstelveen	Team
Silver medal – second place	2002 Macau	Team

Anabel Gambero Erdozain (Note: In this Spanish name, the first or paternal surname is Gambero and the second or maternal family name is Erdozain.) (born July 9, 1972) is a former field hockey defender from Argentina, who won the silver medal with the women's national team at the 2000 Summer Olympics in Sydney, Australia.
