= Field hockey at the 2000 Summer Olympics =

Field hockey at the Games of the XXVII Olympiad
- Venue: Sydney Olympic Park Hockey Centre
- Dates: 16–30 September 2000

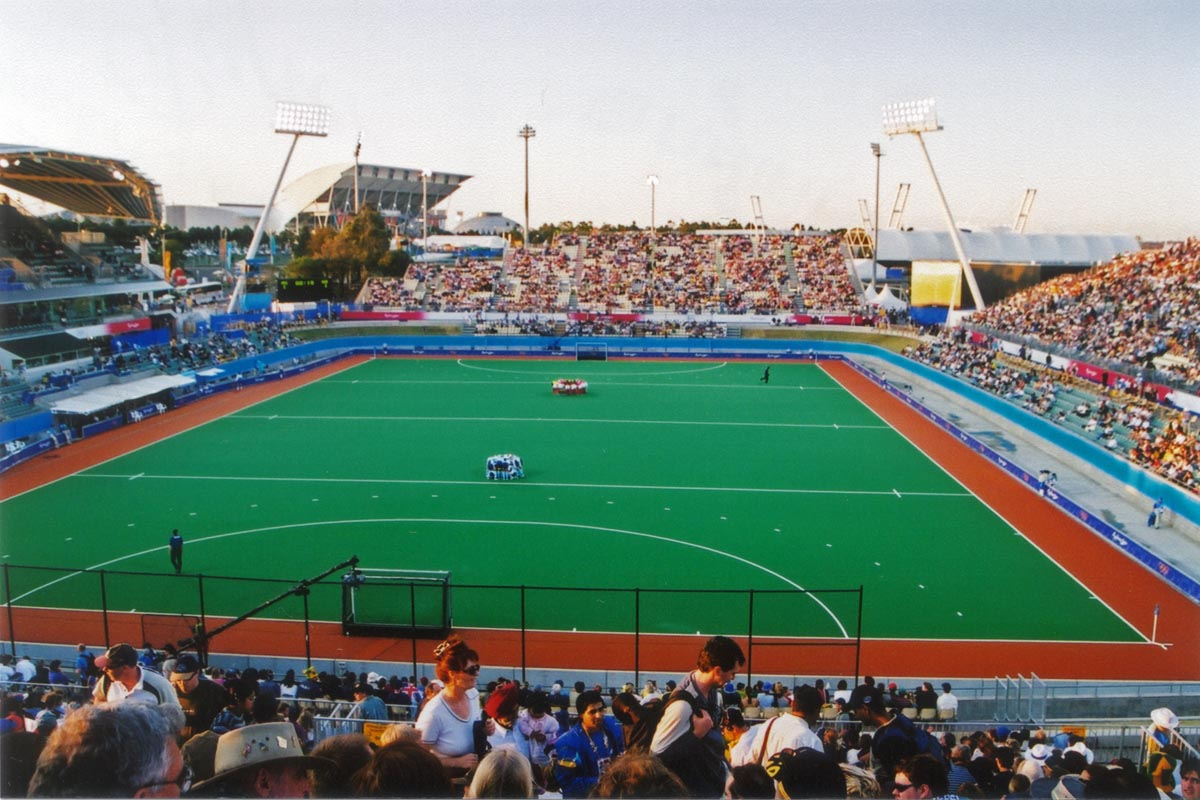
Sydney Olympic Park Hockey Centre during the Olympics.

Field hockey at the 2000 Summer Olympics was held at the Sydney Olympic Park Hockey Centre.

== Medal summary ==
=== Medal table ===
* Host nation (Australia)

Rank	Nation	Gold	Silver	Bronze	Total
1	Australia*	1	0	1	2
1	Netherlands	1	0	1	2
3	Argentina	0	1	0	1
3	South Korea	0	1	0	1
Totals (4 entries)		2	2	2	6

=== Medalists ===
Event	Gold	Silver	Bronze
Men	Netherlands; Ronald Jansen; Erik Jazet; Wouter van Pelt; Bram Lomans; Diederik van Weel; Stephan Veen; Jeroen Delmee; Jacques Brinkman; Remco van Wijk; Teun de Nooijer; Jaap-Derk Buma; Peter Windt; Sander van der Weide; Guus Vogels; Piet-Hein Geeris; Marten Eikelboom	South Korea; Kim Yoon; Ji Seong-Hwan; Seo Jong-Ho; Kim Chel-Hwan; Kim Yong-Bae; Han Hyung-Bae; Kim Kyung-Seok; Kim Jung-Chul; Song Seung-Tae; Kang Keon-Wook; Hwang Jong-Hyun; Lim Jung-Woo; Jeon Jong-Ha; Jeon Hong-Kwon; Yeo Woon-Kon; Lim Jong-Chun	Australia; Michael Brennan; Adam Commens; Jason Duff; Troy Elder; James Elmer; Damon Diletti; Lachlan Dreher; Paul Gaudoin; Jay Stacy; Daniel Sproule; Stephen Davies; Michael York; Craig Victory; Stephen Holt; Matthew Wells; Brent Livermore
Women	Australia; Alyson Annan; Juliet Haslam; Alison Peek; Claire Mitchell-Taverner; Kate Starre; Kate Allen; Lisa Carruthers; Rechelle Hawkes; Clover Maitland; Rachel Imison; Angie Skirving; Julie Towers; Renita Farrell; Jenn Morris; Katrina Powell; Nikki Hudson	Argentina; Mariela Antoniska; Soledad García; Magdalena Aicega; María Paz Ferrari; Anabel Gambero; Ayelén Stepnik; Inés Arrondo; Luciana Aymar; Vanina Oneto; Jorgelina Rimoldi; Karina Masotta; Paola Vukojicic; Laura Maiztegui; Mercedes Margalot; María de la Paz Hernández; Cecilia Rognoni	Netherlands; Julie Deiters; Fatima Moreira de Melo; Clarinda Sinnige; Hanneke Smabers; Dillianne van den Boogaard; Margje Teeuwen; Mijntje Donners; Ageeth Boomgaardt; Macha van der Vaart; Suzan van der Wielen; Myrna Veenstra; Minke Smabers; Carole Thate; Fleur van de Kieft; Minke Booij; Daphne Touw

== Gallery ==
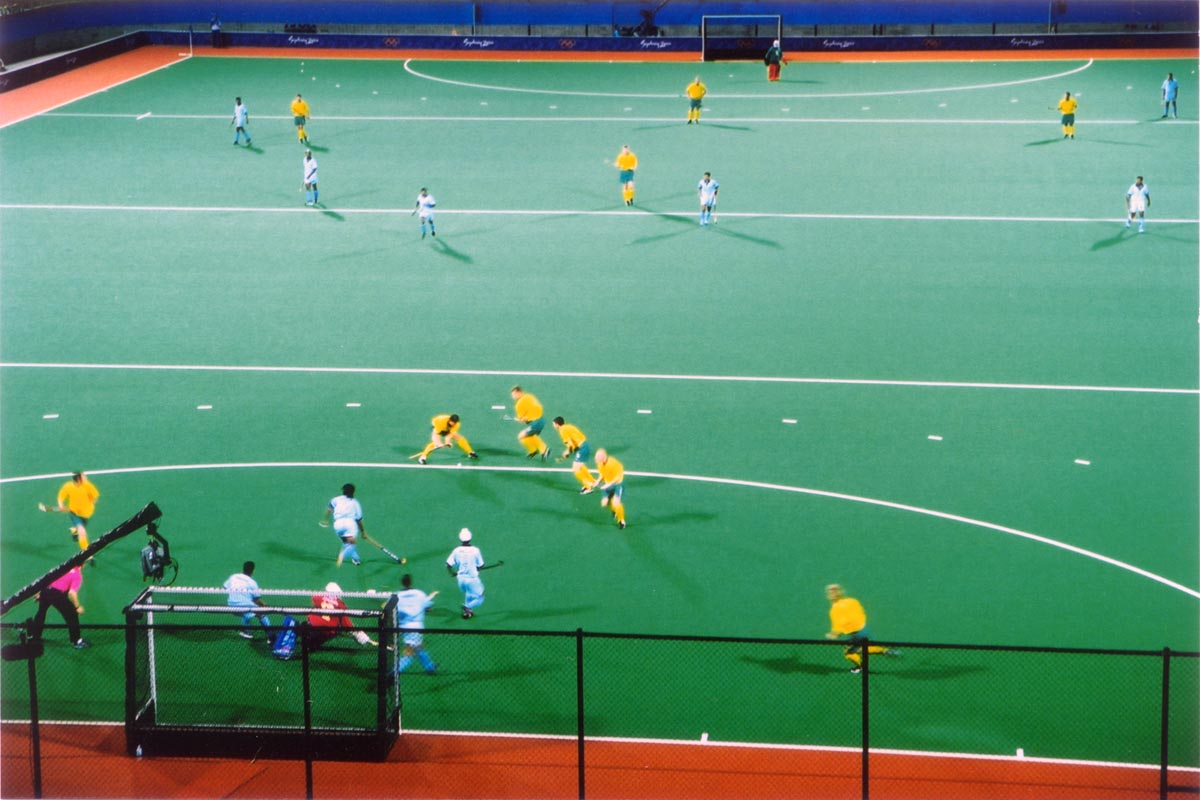

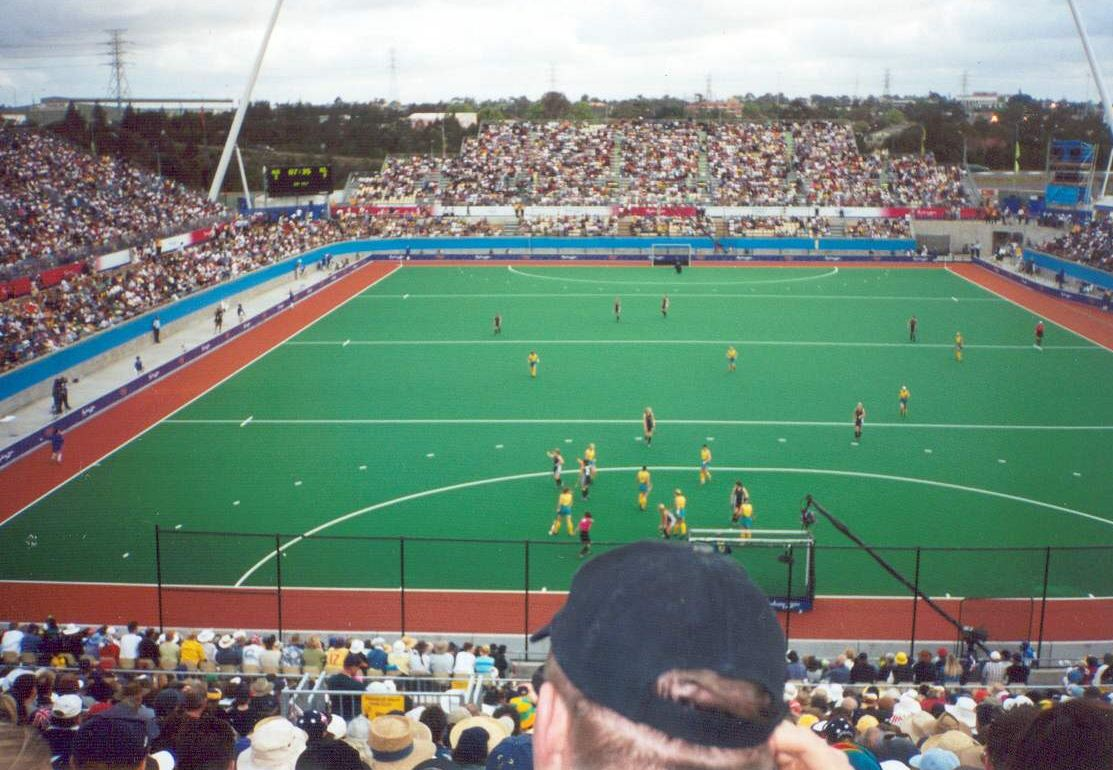

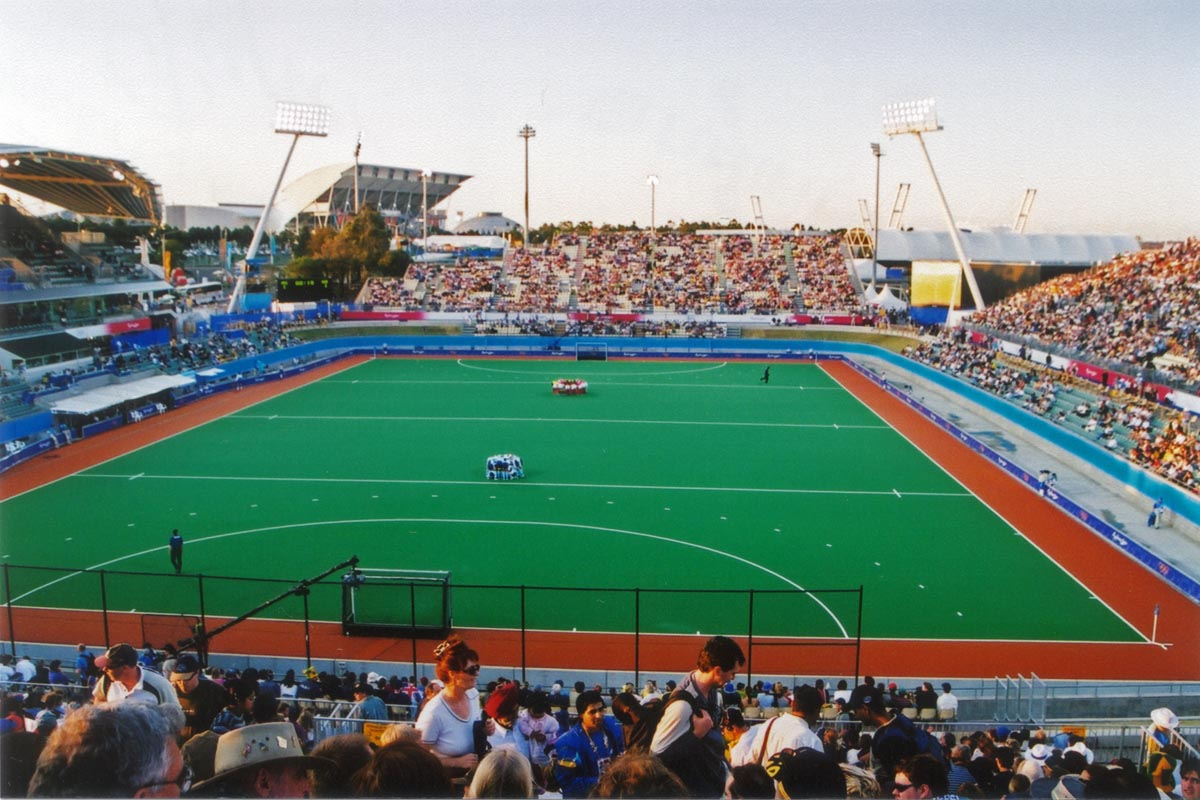

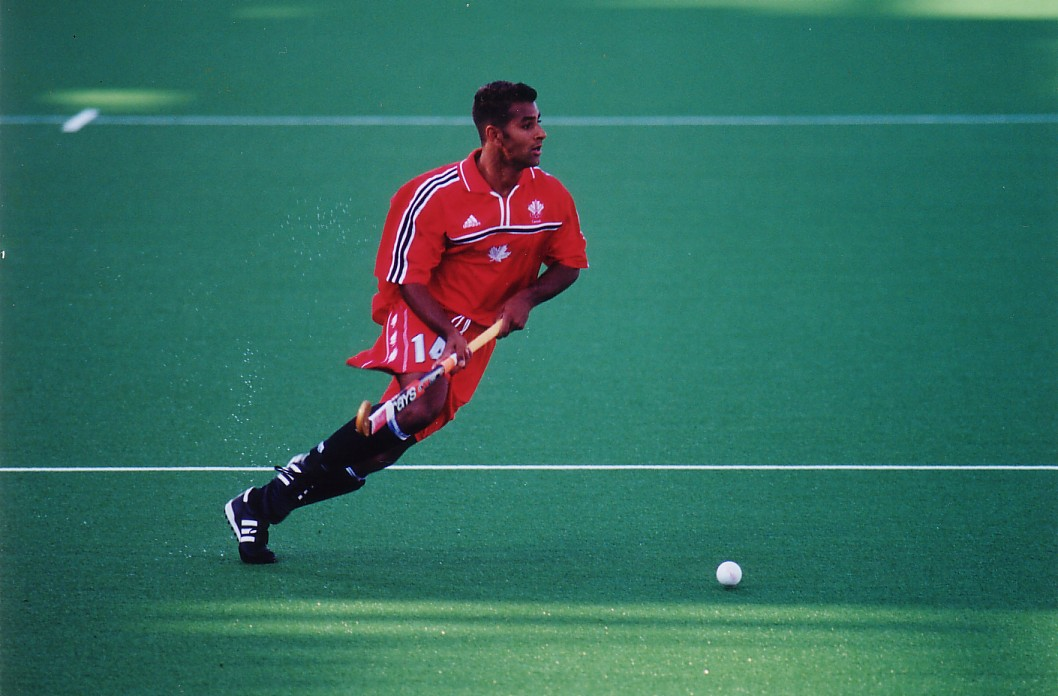
