= Michelle Vizzuso =

American former field hockey player (born 1977)

Michelle Vizzuso (born April 13, 1977, in Fairfield Township, Essex County, New Jersey) is an American former field hockey player who made her international senior debut for the Women's National Team in 1997. Playing as a forward, Vizzuso was a member of the team, that won the silver medal at the 1999 Pan American Games in Winnipeg.

Vizzuso grew up in Fairfield, and attended West Essex High School. She graduated from the University of Virginia in 1999, having majored in English. She currently resides in Marvin, NC.

== International senior tournaments ==
- 1998 – World Cup, Utrecht, The Netherlands (8th)
- 1999 – Pan American Games, Winnipeg, Canada (2nd)
- 2000 – Olympic Qualifying Tournament, Milton Keynes, England (6th)
