= Yu Yali =

Chinese hockey player

Personal information
- Nationality: Chinese
- Born: 25 April 1978 (age 47)

Sport
- Sport: Field hockey

Yu Yali (born 25 April 1978) is a Chinese field hockey player. She competed in the women's tournament at the 2000 Summer Olympics.
