= Sameh Mohamed =

Egyptian hockey player

Personal information
- Nationality: Egyptian
- Born: 28 January 1980 (age 46)

Sport
- Sport: Field hockey

Sameh Mohamed (born 28 January 1980) is an Egyptian former field hockey player. He competed in the men's tournament at the 2004 Summer Olympics.
