= Boudewijn Castelijn =

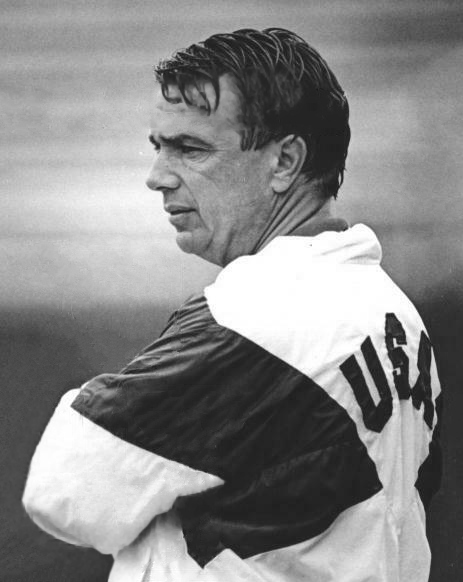
Castelijn in 1988

Boudewijn Castelijn is a former Dutch field hockey coach and team performance trainer. He has been awarded by the FIH a master's degree of International Coaching. He worked at multiple field hockey clubs in the Netherlands. In 1988 he led the United States women's national field hockey team at the Seoul Summer Olympics. He also worked as the national coach for the South African women's field hockey team that competed in the 1998 Women's Hockey World Cup and as a coach for the Belgian KHC Dragons.
