= Maider Luengo =

Spanish field hockey player (born 1980)

Maider Luengo Lasa (born 31 May 1980 in San Sebastián) is a Spanish former field hockey player who competed in the 2004 Summer Olympics.
