= Philippa Suxdorf =

German field hockey player

Philippa Suxdorf (born 27 July 1971) is a German former field hockey player who competed in the 1996 Summer Olympics.
