= Ana Pérez (field hockey) =

Spanish field hockey player (born 1978)

Personal information
- Full name: Ana Raquel Pérez Galindo
- Born: 9 October 1978 (age 47); Madrid, Spain

Ana Raquel Pérez Galindo (Note: In this Spanish name, the first or paternal surname is Pérez and the second or maternal family name is Galindo.) (born 9 October 1978) is a Spanish field hockey player who competed in the 2004 Summer Olympics.
