= Britta Becker =

German field hockey player (born 1973)

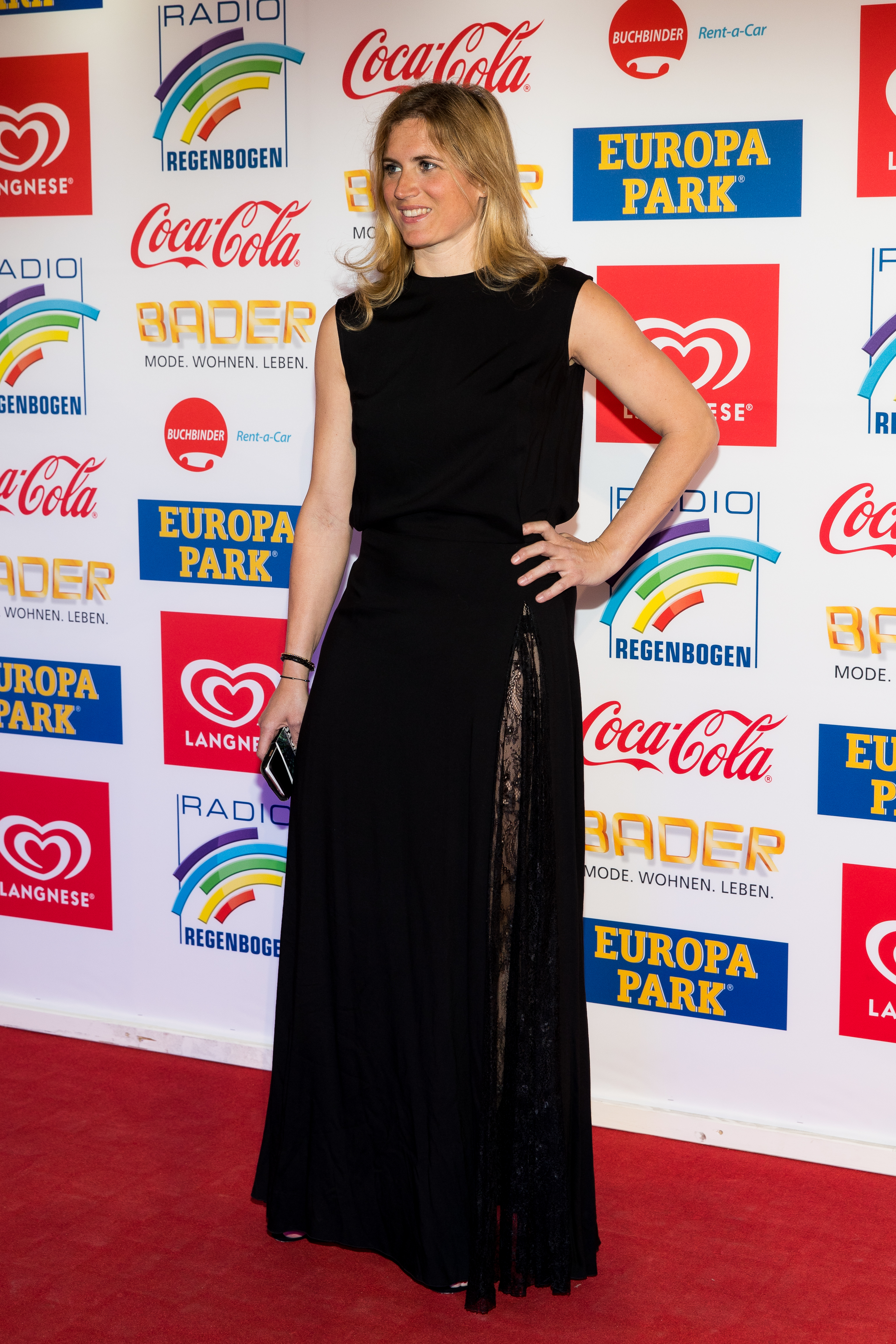
- Becker in 2017

Personal information
- Full name: Britta Christiane Becker-Kerner
- Born: Britta Christiane Becker; 11 May 1973 (age 53) Rüsselsheim
- Height: 176 cm (5 ft 9 in)
- Weight: 65 kg (143 lb)

Sport
- Sport: Field hockey
Medal record
Women's field hockey
Representing Germany
Olympic Games
Silver medal – second place	1992 Barcelona	Team competition
World Cup
Bronze medal – third place	1998 Utrecht	Team Competition
Champions Trophy
Silver medal – second place	1991 Berlin	Team Competition
Silver medal – second place	1997 Berlin	Team Competition
Silver medal – second place	2000 Amstelveen	Team Competition
Bronze medal – third place	1993 Amstelveen	Team competition
Bronze medal – third place	1999 Brisbane	Team Competition
European Nations Cup
Silver medal – second place	1999 Cologne	Team Competition
Bronze medal – third place	1995 Amstelveen	Team Competition

Britta Christiane Becker-Kerner (née Becker; born 11 May 1973 in Rüsselsheim) is a German former field hockey midfield player.

Becker made her debut in the German women's field hockey team in 1991 and was one of the youngest members in the Olympic squad in 1992. She was part of the 1995 bronze medal winning team in the European Cup and the bronze medal-winning team in the 1998 World Cup. She retired in 2004, just before her team won the Olympic gold medal in Athens. She has four children, Emily Blooma (*1999), Nik David (*2001), Polly Marie (*2007) and Jilly Lina (*2009).
