= Mariela Antoniska =

Argentine field hockey player

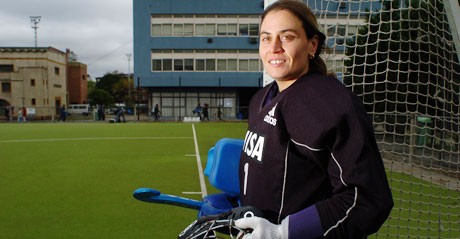

Medal record

Women's field hockey

Representing Argentina

Olympic Games
Silver medal – second place	2000 Sydney	Team
Bronze medal – third place	2004 Athens	Team

World Cup
Gold medal – first place	2002 Perth	

Champions Trophy
Gold medal – first place	2001 Amstelveen	
Silver medal – second place	2002 Macau	
Bronze medal – third place	2004 Rosario	

Pan American Games
Gold medal – first place	1999 Winnipeg	Team
Gold medal – first place	2003 Santo Domingo	Team

Pan American Cup
Gold medal – first place	2001 Kingston	

Mariela Andrea Antoniska Arrondo (born 20 May 1975) is an Argentine field hockey goalkeeper, who won the silver medal with the national field hockey team at the 2000 Summer Olympics in Sydney, the bronze medal at the 2004 Summer Olympics in Athens, the 2002 World Cup, the Champions Trophy in 2001, two Pan American Games and the Pan American Cup in 2001.

Arrondo was born in Banfield, Buenos Aires.
