= Caryn Bentley =

South African field hockey player

Caryn Bentley (born 19 September 1974) is a South African former field hockey player who competed in the 2000 Summer Olympics.
