= Katrin Kauschke =

German field hockey player

Personal information
- Born: 13 September 1971 (age 54) Braunschweig, West Germany
- Height: 1.76 m (5 ft 9 in)
- Weight: 62 kg (137 lb)

Sport
- Sport: Field hockey
- Position: Midfield
Senior career
Years	Team	Caps	Goals
–	Eintracht Braunschweig	-	-
–	Berliner HC	-	-
National team
Years	Team	Caps	Goals
1989–2000	Germany	190	-
Medal record
Representing Germany
Olympic Games
Silver medal – second place	1992 Barcelona	Team competition
World Cup
Bronze medal – third place	1998 Utrecht	Team competition
Champions Trophy
Silver medal – second place	1991 Berlin	Team competition
Silver medal – second place	1997 Berlin	Team competition
Silver medal – second place	2000 Amstelveen	Team competition
Bronze medal – third place	1993 Amstelveen	Team competition
Bronze medal – third place	1999 Brisbane	Team competition
European Championship
Silver medal – second place	1999 Cologne	Team Competition

Katrin Kauschke (born 13 September 1971 in Braunschweig, Lower Saxony) is a former field hockey midfield player from Germany.

Kauschke was a member of the Women's National Team that won the silver medal at the 1992 Summer Olympics in Barcelona, Spain. She competed in three consecutive Summer Olympics, starting in 1992. In total, she has represented Germany in 190 matches.

During her club career, she played for Eintracht Braunschweig and Berliner HC.
