= Tanja Dickenscheid =

German field hockey player

Personal information
- Full name: Tanja Roswitha Dickenscheid
- Born: 17 June 1969 (age 57) Mainz, Rheinland-Pfalz
- Height: 176 cm (5 ft 9 in)
- Weight: 70 kg (154 lb)

Sport
- Sport: Field hockey
Medal record
Women's field hockey
Representing Germany
Olympic Games
Silver medal – second place	1992 Barcelona	Team competition
World Cup
Bronze medal – third place	1998 Utrecht	Team Competition
Champions Trophy
Silver medal – second place	1991 Berlin	Team Competition
Silver medal – second place	1997 Berlin	Team Competition
Silver medal – second place	2000 Amstelveen	Team Competition
European Nations Cup
Bronze medal – third place	1995 Amstelveen	Team Competition

Tanja Roswitha Dickenscheid (born 17 June 1969 in Mainz, Rheinland-Pfalz) is a former field hockey player from Germany, who was a member of the national squad that won the silver medal at the 1992 Summer Olympics in Barcelona. She competed in three consecutive Summer Olympics for her native country, starting in 1992.
