= Amanda González =

Spanish field hockey player (born 1979)

Amanda González Gutiérrez (born 21 January 1979 in Santander, Cantabria) is a former female field hockey player from Spain. She was a member of the Women's National Team at the 2000 Summer Olympics. There the team ended up in fourth place under the guidance of Dutch coach Marc Lammers. She played club hockey for Sardinero Caja Cantabria.
