= Gabriela Pando =

Argentine field hockey player (1970–2024)

Personal information
- Born: 9 March 1970
- Died: 13 February 2024 (aged 53)

Sport
- Country: Argentina
- Sport: Field hockey
- Position: Forward
- Club: Lomas A.C.
Medal record
Women's field hockey
Representing Argentina
World Cup
Silver medal – second place	1994 Dublin	Team competition
Pan American Games
Gold medal – first place	1995 Mar del Plata	Team

Gabriela Pando (9 March 1970 – 13 February 2024) was an Argentine field hockey player. She was a member of the women's national team that competed at the 1996 Summer Olympics, after having won the gold medal the previous year at the 1995 Pan American Games. Pando played for the national team from 1989 to 1998. Pando is regarded as one of the most notable Argentine field hockey players ever.

== Biography ==
Pando started her career at Lomas A.C., where she won seven league titles. Pando also played for the Argentina women's national team between 1989 and 1998.

After her retirement from hockey, Pando worked as team manager of the women's national team between 2014 and 2017. She also took part in a +40 Argentina team that participated in the Masters World Cup, winning the title in 2018 along with other former players such as Vanina Oneto and Cecilia Rognoni.

In 1992 Pando was awarded a silver Olimpia for her achievements in hockey. She was regarded as one of the most notable hockey players of Argentina.

Pando died after a long battle against cancer on 13 February 2024, at the age of 53.
