= Karen Roberts (field hockey) =

South African field hockey player

Karen Lynn Roberts (born 10 June 1967 in Cape Town, Western Cape) is a retired female field hockey player from South Africa, who represented her native country at the 2000 Summer Olympics in Sydney, Australia. There she captained the women's national team that finished in tenth place.
