= Tina Bell-Kake =

New Zealand field hockey player

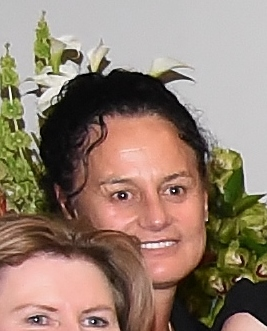
- Bell-Kake in 2018

Personal information
- Full name: Tina Moewai Bell-Kake
- Born: 30 June 1967 (age 58) Taumarunui, New Zealand
Medal record
Women's field hockey
Representing New Zealand
Commonwealth Games
Bronze medal – third place	1998 Kuala Lumpur	Team

Tina Moewai Bell-Kake (born 30 June 1967 in Taumarunui) is a former field hockey midfielder from New Zealand, who finished sixth with her national team at the 2000 Summer Olympics in Sydney. Bell-Kake also competed with The Black Sticks at the 1992 Summer Olympics in Barcelona, and won a bronze medal at the 1998 Commonwealth Games in Kuala Lumpur.
