= Woo Hyun-jung =

South Korean field hockey player

Medal record

Women's field hockey

Representing South Korea

Olympic Games
Silver medal – second place	1996 Atlanta	Team

Asian Games
Gold medal – first place	1998 Bangkok	Team

Asia Cup
Gold medal – first place	1999 New Delhi	

Woo Hyun-Jung (born 20 February 1977) is a South Korean former field hockey player who competed in the 1996 Summer Olympics.
