= Antoinette Lucas =

American field hockey player

Personal information
- Born: October 27, 1968 (age 57) Crozier, Virginia, U.S.
Medal record
Women's field hockey
Representing the United States
Champions Trophy
Bronze medal – third place	1995 Mar del Plata	Team competition

Antoinette Lucas (born October 27, 1968) is a former field hockey midfielder from the United States, who was a member of the US women's team that finished fifth at the 1996 Summer Olympics in Atlanta, Georgia. She attended Northwestern University, where she played for the Wildcats.
