= Vanina Oneto =

Argentine field hockey player

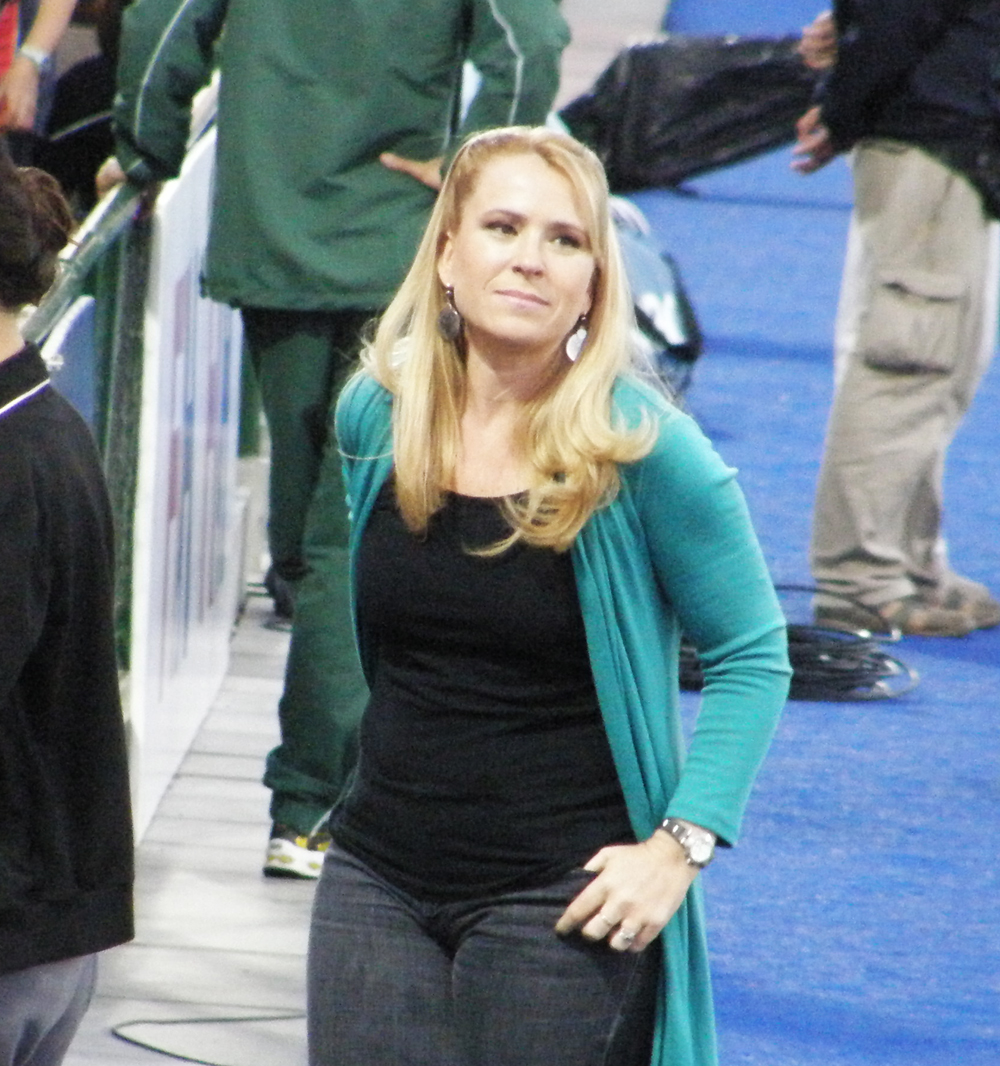
- Oneto in 2010

Personal information
- Born: June 15, 1973 (age 53)
Medal record
Women's field hockey
Representing Argentina
Olympic Games
Silver medal – second place	2000 Sydney	Team
Bronze medal – third place	2004 Athens	Team
World Cup
Gold medal – first place	2002 Perth
Silver medal – second place	1994 Dublin
Champions Trophy
Gold medal – first place	2001 Amstelveen
Silver medal – second place	2002 Macau
Bronze medal – third place	2004 Rosario
Pan American Games
Gold medal – first place	1991 Havana
Gold medal – first place	1995 Mar del Plata
Gold medal – first place	1999 Winnipeg
Pan American Cup
Gold medal – first place	2001 Kingston

Vanina Paula Oneto (born June 15, 1973, in San Fernando) is a retired field hockey player from Argentina, who won the silver medal at the 2000 Summer Olympics in Sydney and the bronze medal at the 2004 Summer Olympics in Athens with the national team. Vanina also won the 2002 World Cup, the 2001 Champions Trophy, three Pan American Games and the Pan American Cup in 2001.

Oneto is the all-time top scorer of Las Leonas, with 148 goals scored, for which she was compared with football striker Gabriel Batistuta, the highest scorer of Argentina national football team by then.

== Biography ==
She made her debut at the age of 15 in Club San Fernando team, becoming champion. In 1991, at the age of 18, she was a member of the Argentine national team that won the gold medal at the Pan American Games in Havana, Cuba. In 1993 she was Junior World Champion and in 1994 she was World Sub-champion in Dublin (Ireland). In 1995 she won her second Pan American Gold Medal.

In 2004 she returned to the National Team after being a mother for the first time and she obtained the bronze medal at the Olympic Games in Athens and that same year she obtained third place in the Champions Trophy.

In September 2022, Boca Juniors announced the club would open a field hockey section for men and women. In May 2023, the club inaugurated a hockey field, with Oneto, a lifelong Boca fan, as part of the project. She was appointed manager of "Boca Juniors Hockey" section.
