= Liu Lijie =

Chinese field hockey player

Personal information
- Nationality: Chinese
- Born: 14 October 1977 (age 48)

Sport
- Sport: Field hockey
Medal record
Women's field hockey
Representing China
Asian Games
Bronze medal – third place	1998 Bangkok	Team

Liu Lijie (born 14 October 1977) is a Chinese former field hockey player. She competed in the women's tournament at the 2000 Summer Olympics.
