= Kerry Bee =

South African field hockey player

Kerry Bee (born 28 September 1974) is a South African former field hockey player who competed in the 2000 Summer Olympics and in the 2004 Summer Olympics.
