= Field hockey at the 2000 Summer Olympics – Women's team squads =

The article list the confirmed women's squads for Olympic Hockey Tournament at the 2000 Summer Olympics in Sydney, Australia.

== Pool C ==
=== Argentina ===
Head Coach: Sergio Vigil

1. Mariela Antoniska (GK)
2. Soledad García
3. Magdalena Aicega
4. María Paz Ferrari
5. Anabel Gambero
6. Ayelén Stepnik
7. Inés Arrondo
8. Luciana Aymar
9. Vanina Oneto
10. Jorgelina Rimoldi
11. Karina Masotta (c)
12. Paola Vukojicic (GK)
13. Laura Maiztegui
14. Mercedes Margalot
15. María de la Paz Hernández
16. Cecilia Rognoni

=== Australia ===
Head Coach: Robert Haigh

4. Alyson Annan
5. Juliet Haslam
7. Alison Peek
9. Claire Mitchell-Taverner
10. Kate Starre
11. Kate Allen
13. Lisa Carruthers
14. Rechelle Hawkes
15. Clover Maitland (GK)
17. Rachel Imison (GK)
24. Angie Skirving
28. Julie Towers
29. Renita Garard
30. Jenn Morris
31. Katrina Powell
32. Nikki Hudson

=== Great Britain ===
Head Coach: Chris Spice

1. Carolyn Reid (GK)
2. Hilary Rose (GK)
3. Kirsty Bowden
4. Jane Smith
6. Melanie Clewlow
7. Tina Cullen
8. Kath Johnson
9. Lucilla Wright
10. Jane Sixsmith
11. Rhona Simpson
12. Denise Marston-Smith
13. Helen Richardson
14. Fiona Greenham
15. Pauline Stott (c)
16. Kate Walsh
17. Mandy Nicholson

=== Korea ===
Head Coach: Park Shin

1. Park Yong-suk (GK)
6. Lee Seon-hwa
7. Kim Eun-jin
8. Kim Mi-hyeon
9. Sin Mi-gyeong
10. Bang Jin-hyeok
11. Kim Seong-eun
12. Kim Su-jeong
13. Oh Seung-Shin
14. Kim Myung-Ok (c)
15. Lee Eun-Young
16. Jeong Hang-ju (GK)
17. Park Eun-Kyung
18. Jo Bo-ra
19. Yu Hui-ju
27. O Go-un

=== Spain ===
Head Coach: Marc Lammers

1. Elena Carrión (GK)
2. Nuria Moreno
3. Amanda González
4. María Carmen Barea
5. Sonia de Ignacio (c)
7. María del Carmen Martín
8. Sonia Barrio
9. Silvia Muñoz
10. Lucía López
11. María del Mar Feito
12. Maider Tellería
13. Elena Urkizu
14. Begoña Larzabal
15. Erdoitza Goikoetxea
16. Cibeles Romero (GK)
17. Núria Camón

== Pool D ==
=== China ===
Head Coach: Kim Chang

1. Nie Yali (GK)
2. Long Fengyu (c)
3. Yang Hongbing
4. Liu Lijie
5. Cheng Hui
6. Shen Lihong
7. Huang Junxia
8. Yang Huiping
9. Yu Yali
11. Tang Chunling
12. Zhou Wanfeng
15. Hou Xiaolan
16. Ding Hongping (GK)
17. Cai Xuemei
18. Chen Zhaoxia
20. Wang Jiuyan

=== Germany ===
Head Coach: Berthold Rauth

1. Julia Zwehl (GK)
2. Birgit Beyer
3. Denise Klecker
4. Tanja Dickenscheid
5. Nadine Ernsting-Krienke
6. Inga Möller
7. Natascha Keller
8. Friederike Barth
12. Britta Becker
13. Marion Rodewald
15. Heike Lätzsch
16. Katrin Kauschke (c)
22. Simone Grässer
24. Fanny Rinne
25. Caroline Casaretto
32. Franziska Gude

=== Netherlands ===
Head Coach: Tom van 't Hek

1. Clarinda Sinnige (GK)
3. Macha van der Vaart
4. Julie Deiters
5. Fatima Moreira de Melo
7. Hanneke Smabers
8. Dillianne van den Boogaard (c)
9. Margje Teeuwen
10. Mijntje Donners
11. Ageeth Boomgaardt
12. Myrna Veenstra
13. Minke Smabers
14. Carole Thate (c)
15. Fleur van de Kieft
16. Suzan van der Wielen
18. Minke Booij
30. Daphne Touw (GK)

=== New Zealand ===
Head Coach: Jan Borren

1. Skippy Hamahona
2. Moira Senior
3. Kylie Foy (c)
4. Sandy Bennett
5. Diana Weavers
6. Rachel Petrie
7. Anna Lawrence
9. Jenny Duck
10. Kate Trolove
11. Michelle Turner
12. Mandy Smith
14. Suzie Pearce
15. Anne-Marie Irving (GK)
16. Helen Clarke (GK)
17. Caryn Paewai
31. Tina Bell-Kake

=== South Africa ===
Head Coach: Gene Muller

1. Paola Vidulich (GK)
2. Inke van Wyk (GK)
4. Jacqueline Geyser
5. Carina van Zyl
6. Anli Kotze
9. Michele MacNaughton
11. Karen Roberts (c)
12. Lindsey Carlisle
13. Karen Symons
14. Kerry Bee
15. Pietie Coetzee
16. Alison Dare
22. Luntu Ntloko
27. Marilyn Agliotti
28. Caryn Bentley
31. Susan Wessels
