= 2000 Women's Hockey Champions Trophy =

International sporting competition

Tournament details
- Host country: Netherlands
- City: Amstelveen
- Dates: 26 May – 3 June
- Teams: 6
- Venue: Wagener Stadium

Final positions
- Champions: Netherlands (2nd title)
- Runner-up: Germany
- Third place: Australia

Tournament statistics
- Matches played: 18
- Goals scored: 60 (3.33 per match)
- Top scorer: (Germany) Nadine Ernsting-Krienke (5 goals)
- Best player: (Argentina) Luciana Aymar

The 2000 Women's Hockey Champions Trophy was the 8th edition of the Hockey Champions Trophy for women. It was held from 26 May to 3 June 2000 in Amstelveen, Netherlands. It was held simultaneously with the men's tournament, just like the year before in Brisbane, Australia. From this year on, the tournament began to be held annually until the 2014 edition due to the introduction of the World League.

The Netherlands won the tournament, and their second title, after 7 years, defeating Germany 3–2 in the final, ending Australia's winning streak of 5 consecutive titles in 9 years.

== Teams ==
The participating teams were determined by International Hockey Federation (FIH):

- Australia (defending champions, champions of 1998 World Cup and 1996 Summer Olympics)
- Netherlands (host nation)
- Germany (third in 1998 World Cup)
- Argentina (fourth in 1998 World Cup)
- New Zealand (sixth in 1998 World Cup)
- South Africa (seventh in 1998 World Cup)

== Squads ==
Argentina

Head Coach: Sergio Vigil

1. Mariela Antoniska (GK)
2. Agustina García
3. Magdalena Aicega
4. María Paz Ferrari
5. Anabel Gambero
6. Ayelén Stepnik
8. Luciana Aymar
9. Vanina Oneto
10. Jorgelina Rimoldi
11. Karina Masotta (c)
12. Mariana González Oliva
13. Laura Maiztegui
14. Mercedes Margalot
15. María de la Paz Hernández
16. Inés Arrondo
17. Andrea Haines
18. Paola Vukojicic (GK)
Australia
- Head coach: Ric Charlesworth
2. Louise Dobson
3. Karen Smith
4. Alyson Annan
6. Bianca Langham
7. Alison Peek
9. Claire Mitchell-Taverner
10. Kate Starre
12. Brooke Morrison
13. Lisa Carruthers (c)
14. Rechelle Hawkes
15. Clover Maitland (GK)
17. Rachel Imison (GK)
24. Angie Skirving
28. Julie Towers
29. Renita Garard
30. Jenn Morris
31. Katrina Powell
32. Nikki Hudson
Germany

Head Coach: Berti Rauth

1. Julia Zwehl (GK)
2. Birgit Beyer (GK)
3. Denise Klecker
4. Tanja Dickenscheid
5. Nadine Ernsting-Krienke
6. Inga Möller
7. Natascha Keller
8. Melanie Cremer
9. Friederike Barth
11. Cornelia Reiter
12. Britta Becker
13. Marion Rodewald
15. Heike Lätzsch
16. Katrin Kauschke (c)
22. Simone Grässer
24. Fanny Rinne
25. Caroline Casaretto
32. Franziska Gude
Netherlands

Head Coach: Tom van 't Hek

1. Clarinda Sinnige (GK)
2. Miek van Geenhuizen
3. Macha van der Vaart
4. Julie Deiters
5. Fatima Moreira de Melo
7. Hanneke Smabers
8. Dillianne van den Boogaard
9. Margje Teeuwen
10. Mijntje Donners
11. Ageeth Boomgaardt
12. Myrna Veenstra
13. Minke Smabers
14. Carole Thate (c)
15. Fleur van de Kieft
16. Suzan van der Wielen
18. Minke Booij
19. Eveline de Haan (GK)
22. Mieketine Wouters
New Zealand

Head Coach: Jan Borren

1. Skippy McGregor
2. Moira Senior
3. Kylie Foy
4. Sandy Bennett
5. Rachel Sutherland
6. Rachel Petrie
7. Anna Lawrence (c)
8. Robyn Matthews
11. Michelle Turner
12. Mandy Smith
13. Lisa Walton
14. Suzie Pearce
15. Anne-Marie Irving (GK)
16. Helen Clarke (GK)
18. Diana Weavers
19. Leisen Jobe
South Africa

Head Coach: Gene Muller

1. Paola Vidulich (GK)
2. Inke van Wyk (GK)
3. Sharon Cormack
4. Jacqui Geyser
5. Carina van Zyl
6. Anli Kotze
8. Megan Dobson
9. Michele MacNaughton
11. Karen Roberts (c)
12. Lindsey Carlisle
13. Karen Symons
14. Kerry Bee
15. Pietie Coetzee
16. Alison Dare
18. Jennifer Jones
22. Luntu Ntloko
27. Marilyn Agliotti
28. Caryn Bentley

== Umpires ==
Below are the 9 umpires appointed by the International Hockey Federation:

- Judith Barnersby (AUS)
- Gill Clarke (ENG)
- Renée Cohen (NED)
- Marelize de Klerk (RSA)
- Lyn Farrell (NZL)
- Heike Malina (GER)
- Alexandra Royaards (NED)
- Gina Spitaleri (ITA)
- Anne van Dyk (CAN)

== Results ==
All times are Central European Summer Time (UTC+02:00)

=== Pool ===
Pos	Team	Pld	W	D	L	GF	GA	GD	Pts	Qualification
1	Netherlands	5	4	0	1	10	4	+6	12	Final
2	Germany	5	3	1	1	9	7	+2	10	Final
3	Australia	5	3	0	2	15	5	+10	9	
4	Argentina	5	2	1	2	7	8	−1	7	
5	New Zealand	5	0	2	3	5	13	−8	2	
6	South Africa	5	0	2	3	6	15	−9	2	

Source: FIH
Rules for classification: 1) points; 2) goal difference; 3) goals scored; 4) head-to-head result.

26 May 2000
12:05

Germany	2–1	Argentina
Casaretto 50'; Becker 53'	Report	Oneto 55'

Umpires:
Marelize de Klerk (RSA)
Lyn Farrell (NZL)

26 May 2000
14:30

New Zealand	1–4	Australia
Senior 51'	Report	Mitchell-Taverner 13', 46'; Langham 24', 70'

Umpires:
Gina Spitaleri (ITA)
Renee Cohen (NED)

26 May 2000
19:30

South Africa	2–3	Netherlands
Bentley 20'; Coetzee 43'	Report	Van der Wielen 8'; Van den Boogaard 51'; Donners 55'

Umpires:
Judith Barnesby (AUS)
Gill Clarke (ENG)

27 May 2000
15:00

Australia	3–0	Argentina
Powell 23'; Towers 35'; Morris 57'	Report

Umpires:
Alexandra Royaards (NED)
Heike Malina (GER)

27 May 2000
20:00

South Africa	1–3	Germany
Agliotti 26'	Report	Rinne 30'; Becker 41'; Ernsting-Krienke 50'

Umpires:
Anne van Dijk (CAN)
Renée Cohen (NED)

28 May 2000
20:30

Netherlands	3–0	New Zealand
Boomgaardt 21'; Moreira de Melo 31'; Van der Wielen 49'	Report

Umpires:
Gina Spitaleri (ITA)
Marelize de Klerk (RSA)

29 May 2000
14:30

Germany	2–1	Australia
Lätzsch 31'; Becker 69'	Report	Powell 19'

Umpires:
Lyn Farrell (NZL)
Gill Clarke (ENG)

29 May 2000
17:00

South Africa	1–1	New Zealand
Coetzee 17'	Report	McGregor 33'

Umpires:
Anne van Dyk (NED)
Alexandra Royaards (NED)

29 May 2000
19:30

Argentina	1–0	Netherlands
Hernández 60'	Report

Umpires:
Heike Malina (GER)
Judith Barnesby (AUS)

31 May 2000
12:00

New Zealand	2–2	Germany
Foy 24'; Smith 64'	Report	Ernsting-Krienke 33', 69'

Umpires:
Renée Cohen (NED)
Anne van Dyk (CAN)

31 May 2000
17:00

Argentina	2–2	South Africa
Maiztegui 11'; Oneto 27'	Report	Coetzee 46'; Bee 68'

Umpires:
Gina Spitaleri (ITA)
Judith Barnesby (AUS)

31 May 2000
19:30

Netherlands	2–1	Australia
Deiters 12'; Van der Wielen 49'	Report	Powell 56'

Umpires:
Gill Clarke (ENG)
Marelize de Klerk (RSA)

1 June 2000
15:00

New Zealand	1–3	Argentina
Walton 38'	Report	Aicega 18'; Oneto 20', 53'

Umpires:
Alexandra Royaards (NED)
Heike Malina (GER)

1 June 2000
17:00

Netherlands	2–0	Germany
Van de Kieft 31'; Van der Wielen 39'	Report

Umpires:
Gill Clarke (ENG)
Gina Spitaleri (ITA)

1 June 2000
19:30

Australia	6–0	South Africa
Morris 3', 14'; Garard 23'; Hawkes 38'; Annan 57'; Smith 63'	Report

Umpires:
Renée Cohen (NED)
Lyn Farrell (NZL)

=== Classification ===
==== Fifth and sixth place ====
3 June 2000
10:00

New Zealand	0–2	South Africa
	Report	Coetzee 35'; Symons 49'

Umpires:
Anne van Dijk (CAN)
Gill Clarke (ENG)

==== Third and fourth place ====
3 June 2000
12:30

Australia	1–0	Argentina
Morris 65'	Report

Umpires:
Renée Cohen (NED)
Lyn Farrell (NZL)

==== Final ====
3 June 2000
15:00

Netherlands	3–2	Germany
Boomgaardt 5', 69'; Van den Boogaard 18'	Report	Ernsting-Krienke 22', 30'

Umpires:
Judith Barnesby (AUS)
Marelize de Klerk (RSA)

== Awards ==
Player of the Tournament	Top Goalscorer	Young Player of the Tournament	Fair Play Trophy
(Argentina) Luciana Aymar	(Germany) Nadine Ernsting-Krienke	(Netherlands) Minke Smabers	Australia

== Statistics ==
=== Final standings ===
1. Netherlands
2. Germany
3. Australia
4. Argentina
5. South Africa
6. New Zealand

=== Goalscorers ===
There were 60 goals scored in 18 matches, for an average of 3.33 goals per match.

5 goals

- (Germany) Nadine Ernsting-Krienke

4 goals

- (Argentina) Vanina Oneto
- (Australia) Jenn Morris
- (Netherlands) Suzan van der Wielen
- (South Africa) Pietie Coetzee

3 goals

- (Australia) Katrina Powell
- (Germany) Britta Becker
- (Netherlands) Ageeth Boomgaardt

2 goals

- (Australia) Bianca Langham
- (Australia) Claire Mitchell-Taverner
- (Netherlands) Dillianne van den Boogaard

1 goal

- (Argentina) Magdalena Aicega
- (Argentina) María de la Paz Hernández
- (Argentina) Laura Maiztegui
- (Australia) Alyson Annan
- (Australia) Renita Garard
- (Australia) Rechelle Hawkes
- (Australia) Karen Smith
- (Australia) Julie Towers
- (Germany) Caroline Casaretto
- (Germany) Heike Lätzsch
- (Germany) Fanny Rinne
- (Netherlands) Julie Deiters
- (Netherlands) Mijntje Donners
- (Netherlands) Fatima Moreira de Melo
- (Netherlands) Fleur van de Kieft
- (New Zealand) Kylie Foy
- (New Zealand) Marama McGregor
- (New Zealand) Moira Senior
- (New Zealand) Mandy Smith
- (New Zealand) Lisa Walton
- (South Africa) Marilyn Agliotti
- (South Africa) Kerry Bee
- (South Africa) Caryn Bentley
- (South Africa) Karen Symons

Source: FIH
