= 1999 Women's Hockey Champions Trophy =

Field hockey tournament

Tournament details
- Host country: Australia
- City: Brisbane
- Dates: 10 June 1999 to 19 June 1999
- Teams: 6
- Venue: Queensland State Hockey Centre

Final positions
- Champions: Australia (5th title)
- Runner-up: Netherlands
- Third place: Germany

Tournament statistics
- Matches played: 18
- Goals scored: 73 (4.06 per match)
- Top scorer: (Australia) Alyson Annan (6 goals)

The 1999 Women's Hockey Champions Trophy was the 7th edition of the Hockey Champions Trophy for women. It was held from 10 to 19 June 1999 in Brisbane, Australia. It was held simultaneously with the men's tournament. This was the last biannual edition of the tournament until 2014 when it returned to its original format due to the introduction of the World League.

Australia won the tournament for the fifth consecutive time.

== Teams ==
The participating teams were determined by International Hockey Federation (FIH):

- Australia (Host nation, defending champions, champions of 1998 World Cup and 1996 Summer Olympics)
- Netherlands (Second in 1998 World Cup)
- Germany (Third in 1998 World Cup)
- Argentina (Fourth in 1998 World Cup)
- South Korea (Fifth in 1998 World Cup)
- New Zealand (Sixth in 1998 World Cup)

== Squads ==
Argentina
- Head coach: Sergio Vigil
1. Mariela Antoniska (GK)
2. Agustina García
3. Magdalena Aicega
4. Silvia Corvalán
5. Anabel Gambero
6. Ayelén Stepnik
7. María de la Paz Hernández
8. Luciana Aymar
9. Alejandra Gulla
10. Jorgelina Rimoldi
11. Karina Masotta (c)
12. Mariana González Oliva
13. Paola Vukojicic (gk)
14. Mercedes Margalot
15. Natalia Morello
16. Cecilia Rognoni
17. Andrea Haines
18. Inés Arrondo
Australia
- Head coach: Ric Charlesworth
2. Louise Dobson
3. Karen Smith
4. Alyson Annan
5. Juliet Haslam
6. Bianca Langham
7. Alison Peek
9. Claire Mitchell-Taverner
12. Brooke Morrison
13. Lisa Carruthers
14. Rechelle Hawkes (c)
15. Clover Maitland (GK)
16. Michelle Andrews
17. Rachel Imison (GK)
18. Kristen Towers
28. Julie Towers
29. Renita Garard
31. Katrina Powell
32. Nikki Mott
Germany
- Head coach: Berti Rauth
1. Julia Zwehl (GK)
2. Birgit Beyer (GK)
5. Nadine Ernsting-Krienke
6. Inga Möller
7. Natascha Keller
8. Melanie Cremer
9. Friederike Barth
11. Cornelia Reiter
12. Britta Becker
13. Marion Rodewald
14. Philippa Suxdorf
15. Heike Lätzsch
16. Katrin Kauschke (c)
21. Badri Latif
22. Simone Grässer
24. Fanny Rinne
25. Caroline Casaretto
32. Franziska Gude
South Korea
- Head coach: Kim Seon-dong
1. Park Yong-sook (GK)
2. Lee Jin-hee
3. Kim Mi-hyun
4. Yoo Hee-joo
5. Lee Mi-seong
6. Lee Sun-hwa
7. Kim Eun-jin
8. An Mi-Kyong
9. Shin Mi-kyung
10. Park Eun-kyung
11. Kim Seong-eun
12. Kim Soo-jung
13. Park Hyun-hee
14. Oh Soo-jin
15. Lee Eun-young (c)
16. Ko Soon-ja (GK)
17. Woo Hyun-jung
18. Cho Bo-ra
Netherlands
- Head coach: Tom van 't Hek
1. Clarinda Sinnige (GK)
2. Daphne Touw (GK)
3. Macha van der Vaart
4. Julie Deiters
5. Fatima Moreira de Melo
6. Karlijn Petri
7. Hanneke Smabers
8. Dillianne van den Boogaard
9. Margje Teeuwen
10. Mijntje Donners
11. Ageeth Boomgaardt
12. Myrna Veenstra
13. Minke Smabers
14. Carole Thate (c)
15. Fleur van de Kieft
16. Suzan van der Wielen
17. Eefke Mulder
18. Minke Booij
New Zealand
- Head coach: Jan Borren
1. Skippy McGregor
2. Moira Senior
3. Kylie Foy
4. Sandy Bennett
5. Toni Mason
6. Rachel Petrie
7. Anna Lawrence (c)
8. Robyn Matthews
9. Jenny Duck
10. Kate Trolove
11. Michelle Turner
12. Mandy Smith
13. Lisa Walton
14. Suzie Pearce
15. Anne-Marie Irving (GK)
16. Helen Clarke (GK)
17. Caryn Paewai
18. Diana Weavers

== Results ==
All times are Eastern Standard Time (UTC+10:00)

=== Pool ===
Pos	Team	Pld	W	D	L	GF	GA	GD	Pts	Qualification
1	Australia	5	4	1	0	22	6	+16	13	Final
2	Netherlands	5	3	1	1	11	7	+4	10	Final
3	Germany	5	3	0	2	14	11	+3	9	
4	Argentina	5	2	1	2	8	10	−2	7	
5	New Zealand	5	1	1	3	6	13	−7	4	
6	South Korea	5	0	0	5	2	16	−14	0	

Source: FIH
Rules for classification: 1) points; 2) goal difference; 3) goals scored; 4) head-to-head result.

10 June 1999
15:05

Netherlands	3–0	Argentina
Van de Kieft 4', 27'; Thate 35'	Report

Umpires:
Jane Nockolds (ENG)
Renee Chatas (USA)

10 June 1999
20:05

Australia	5–1	New Zealand
Mitchell-Taverner 21'; Mott 38'; Powell 49', 59'; Andrews 65'	Report	Senior 58'

Umpires:
Ute Conen (GER)
Maria Mendez (ARG)

11 June 1999
15:05

Argentina	2–1	Germany
Masotta 17'; Hernández 35'	Report	Rodewald 57'

Umpires:
Renée Cohen (NED)
Lyn Farrell (NZL)

11 June 1999
17:45

South Korea	2–3	Netherlands
Woo Hyun-jung 44'; Lee Eun-young 68'	Report	Van den Boogaard 8', 55'; Boomgaardt 22'

Umpires:
Michele Arnold (AUS)
Marelize de Klerk (RSA)

12 June 1999
15:05

Australia	6–2	Germany
Peek 8'; Annan 15', 69'; Dobson 30'; Mitchell-Taverner 43', 60'	Report	Keller 41', 68'

Umpires:
Jane Nockolds (ENG)
Marelize de Klerk (RSA)

12 June 1999
17:25

South Korea	0–1	New Zealand
	Report	Lawrence 32'

Umpires:
Judith Barnesby (AUS)
Renée Cohen (NED)

13 June 1999
15:05

Argentina	2–4	Australia
Rognoni 15'; García 48'	Report	Mitchell-Taverner 6'; Annan 11'; Mott 25'; Langham 55'

Umpires:
Renee Chatas (USA)
Ute Conen (GER)

13 June 1999
17:25

Netherlands	2–1	New Zealand
Thate 33'; Boomgaardt 53'	Report	Trolove 14'

Umpires:
Maria Mendez (ARG)
Michele Arnold (AUS)

14 June 1999
15:05

South Korea	0–2	Argentina
	Report	Gulla 46'; Masotta 70'

Umpires:
Michele Arnold (AUS)
Renee Chatas (USA)

14 June 1999
17:05

Germany	3–2	Netherlands
Cremer 34'; Ernsting-Krienke 51'; Casaretto 67'	Report	Van de Kieft 50'; Boomgaardt 70'

Umpires:
Judith Barnesby (AUS)
Lyn Farrell (NZL)

15 June 1999
18:05

New Zealand	1–4	Germany
Senior 25'	Report	Ernsting-Krienke 33'; Keller 40'; Möller 49'; Becker 56'

Umpires:
Judith Barnesby (AUS)
Marelize de Klerk (RSA)

15 June 1999
20:05

Australia	6–0	South Korea
Hawkes 22'; Annan 39', 63'; Mitchell-Taverner 52'; Langham 56'; Andrews 62'	Report

Umpires:
Renée Cohen (NED)
Maria Mendez (ARG)

17 June 1999
15:05

Germany	4–0	South Korea
Gude 5'; Becker 45'; Keller 58'; Lätzsch 70'	Report

Umpires:
Maria Mendez (ARG)
Jane Nockolds (ENG)

17 June 1999
18:05

Argentina	2–2	New Zealand
Hernández 33'; Rognoni 42'	Report	Turner 7'; Smith 65'

Umpires:
Michele Arnold (AUS)
Ute Conen (GER)

17 June 1999
20:05

Australia	1–1	Netherlands
Annan 24'	Report	Van de Kieft 20'

Umpires:
Lyn Farrell (NZL)
Renee Chatas (USA)

=== Classification ===
==== Fifth and sixth place ====
19 June 1999
10:05

New Zealand	3–1	South Korea
Lawrence 16'; Smith 28'; Senior 55'	Report	Kim Mi-hyeon 39'

Umpires:
Judith Barnesby (AUS)
Jane Nockolds (ENG)

==== Third and fourth place ====
19 June 1999
12:35

Germany	1–0	Argentina
Keller 67'	Report

Umpires:
Renée Cohen (NED)
Lyn Farrell (NZL)

==== Final ====
19 June 1999
15:05

Australia	3–2	Netherlands
Powell 1', 55'; Langham 30'	Report	Van den Boogaard 19'; Petri 35'

Umpires:
Ute Conen (GER)
Marelize de Klerk (RSA)

== Statistics ==
=== Final standings ===
1. Australia
2. Netherlands
3. Germany
4. Argentina
5. New Zealand
6. South Korea

=== Goalscorers ===
There were 73 goals scored in 18 matches, for an average of 4.06 goals per match.

6 goals

- (Australia) Alyson Annan

5 goals

- (Australia) Claire Mitchell-Taverner
- (Germany) Natascha Keller

4 goals

- (Australia) Katrina Powell
- (Netherlands) Fleur van de Kieft

3 goals

- (Australia) Bianca Langham
- (Netherlands) Ageeth Boomgaardt
- (Netherlands) Dillianne van den Boogaard
- (New Zealand) Moira Senior

2 goals

- (Argentina) María de la Paz Hernández
- (Argentina) Karina Masotta
- (Argentina) Cecilia Rognoni
- (Australia) Michelle Andrews
- (Australia) Nikki Mott
- (Germany) Britta Becker
- (Germany) Nadine Ernsting-Krienke
- (Netherlands) Carole Thate
- (New Zealand) Anna Lawrence
- (New Zealand) Mandy Smith

1 goal

- (Argentina) Soledad García
- (Argentina) Alejandra Gulla
- (Australia) Louise Dobson
- (Australia) Rechelle Hawkes
- (Australia) Alison Peek
- (Germany) Caroline Casaretto
- (Germany) Melanie Cremer
- (Germany) Franziska Gude
- (Germany) Heike Lätzsch
- (Germany) Inga Möller
- (Germany) Marion Rodewald
- (Netherlands) Karlijn Petri
- (New Zealand) Kate Trolove
- (New Zealand) Michelle Turner
- (South Korea) Lee Eun-young
- (South Korea) Woo Hyun-jung
- (South Korea) Kim Mi-hyeon

Source: FIH
