= 2000 Women's Field Hockey Olympic Qualifier =

Tournament details
- Host country: England
- City: Milton Keynes
- Dates: 24 March – 2 April
- Teams: 10
- Venue: National Hockey Stadium

Final positions
- Champions: New Zealand
- Runner-up: Great Britain
- Third place: Germany

Tournament statistics
- Matches played: 29
- Goals scored: 79 (2.72 per match)
- Top scorer: (New Zealand) Amanda Smith (4 goals)

The 2000 Women's Field Hockey Olympic Qualifier was the fourth time a qualification tournament was held for the Olympic Games. The tournament was held in Milton Keynes, England, from 24 March to 2 April.

The top five placed teams from the tournament qualified for the 2000 Summer Olympics in Sydney, Australia.

== Officials ==
The following umpires were appointed by the International Hockey Federation to officiate the tournament:

- Michelle Arnold (AUS)
- Jane Buchanan (RSA)
- Renée Chatas (USA)
- Ute Conen (GER)
- Renée Cohen (NED)
- Ute Conen (GER)
- Lyn Farrell (NZL)
- Miriam van Gemert (NED)
- Angela Larío (ESP)
- Lee Mi-ok (KOR)
- Jane Nockolds (ENG)
- Mary Power (IRE)
- Gina Spitaleri (ITA)
- Kazuko Yasueda (JPN)
- Jun Zhang (CHN)

== Squads ==
China

Head coach: Kim Changbak

1. Nie Yali (GK)
2. Long Fengyu (C)
3. Yang Hongbing
4. Liu Lijie
5. Cheng Hui
6. Shen Lihong
7. Huang Junxia
8. Yang Huiping
9. Yu Yali
11. Tang Chunling
12. Zhou Wanfeng
15. Hu Xiaolan
16. Ding Hongping
17. Cai Xuemei
18. Chen Zhaoxia
19. Chen Qiuqi
20. Wang Jiuyan
21. Li Juan (GK)
Germany

Head coach: Berti Rauth

1. Julia Zwehl (GK)
2. Birgit Beyer (GK)
3. Denise Klecker
4. Tanja Dickenscheid
5. Nadine Ernsting-Krienke
6. Inga Möller
7. Natascha Keller
8. Melanie Cremer
9. Friederike Barth
11. Cornelia Reiter
12. Britta Becker
13. Marion Rodewald
15. Heike Lätzsch
16. Katrin Kauschke (C)
22. Simone Grässer
24. Fanny Rinne
25. Caroline Casaretto
32. Franziska Gude
Great Britain

Head coach: Jon Royce

1. Carolyn Reid (GK)
2. Hilary Rose (GK)
3. Kirsty Bowden
4. Jane Smith
5. Susan Chandler (C)
6. Melanie Clewlow
7. Tina Cullen
8. Kathryn Johnson
9. Mandy Nicholson
10. Jane Sixsmith
11. Purdy Miller
12. Denise Marston-Smith
13. Helen Richardson
14. Fiona Greenham
15. Janet Jack
16. Kate Walsh
17. Sarah Blanks
18. Lucilla Wright
India

Head coach: Jon Royce

Ireland

Head coach: Jon Royce

Japan

Head coach: Jon Royce

New Zealand

Head coach: Jon Royce

Russia

Head coach: Jon Royce

Spain

Head coach: Jon Royce

United States

Head coach: Jon Royce

== Results ==
=== Preliminary round ===
==== Group A ====
Pos	Team	Pld	W	D	L	GF	GA	GD	Pts	Qualification
1	Germany	4	3	1	0	11	3	+8	10	Advanced to Semi-finals
2	Spain	4	2	2	0	8	4	+4	8	Advanced to Semi-finals
3	United States	4	1	2	1	6	8	−2	5	
4	Ireland	4	1	1	2	3	5	−2	4	
5	India	4	0	0	4	2	10	−8	0	

Source: USA Field Hockey
Rules for classification: 1) Points; 2) Matches won; 3) Goal difference; 4) Goals for; 5) Head-to-head result.

24 March 2000
12:05

India	1–3	Spain
Mamta 70'	Report	Barrio 24', 62'; De Ignacio-Simo 34'

Umpires:
Lyn Farrell (NZL)
Gina Spitaleri (ITA)

24 March 2000
14:05

Germany	4–1	United States
Möller 15'; Reiter 42'; Keller 62'; Ernsting-Krienke 65'	Report	Vizzuso 9'

Umpires:
Michelle Arnold (AUS)
Renée Cohen (NED)

25 March 2000
12:05

Ireland	1–0	India
Kohler 28'	Report

Umpires:
Jean Buchanan (RSA)
Kazuko Yasueda (JPN)

25 March 2000
14:05

Spain	1–1	Germany
Camón 11'	Report	Keller 59'

Umpires:
Gina Spitaleri (ITA)
Gillian Clarke (GBR)

26 March 2000
14:05

United States	1–1	Ireland
Werley 4'	Report	Mills 69'

27 March 2000
14:05

India	0–4	Germany
	Report	Becker 39'; Ernsting-Krienke 47'; Kauschke 56', 66'

Umpires:
Jun Zhang (CHN)
Kazuko Yasueda (JPN)

28 March 2000
12:05

Spain	2–2	United States
De Ignacio-Simo 53'; Tellería 65'	Report	Race 38'; Werley 69'

Umpires:
Kazuko Yasueda (JPN)
Lee Mi-ok (KOR)

28 March 2000
14:05

Germany	2–1	Ireland
Becker 7', 46'	Report	O'Brien 31'

Umpires:
Jane Buchanan (RSA)
Janice McDonald (SCO)

29 March 2000
12:05

United States	2–1	India
Werley 48'; Fuchs 66'	Report	Jyoti 31'

Umpires:
Jun Zhang (CHN)
Miriam van Gemert (NED)

29 March 2000
14:05

Ireland	0–2	Spain
	Report	Camón 39'; Goikoetxea 48'

Umpires:
Jane Nockolds (ENG)
Kazuko Yasueda (JPN)

==== Pool B ====
Pos	Team	Pld	W	D	L	GF	GA	GD	Pts	Qualification
1	Great Britain (H)	4	3	0	1	8	2	+6	9	Advanced to Semi-finals
2	New Zealand	4	2	1	1	9	4	+5	7	Advanced to Semi-finals
3	China	4	2	1	1	4	2	+2	7	
4	Japan	4	2	0	2	7	4	+3	6	
5	Russia	4	0	0	4	2	18	−16	0	

Source: USA Field Hockey
Rules for classification: 1) Points; 2) Matches won; 3) Goal difference; 4) Goals for; 5) Head-to-head result.
(H) Hosts

24 March 2000
16:05

Russia	1–3	China
Ioudovskaia 39'	Report	Long 28'; Yang 58'; Wang 60'

Umpires:
Miriam van Gemert (NED)
Jane Buchanan (RSA)

24 March 2000
18:05

New Zealand	0–4	Japan
	Report	Iwao 9'; Saito 31'; Kato 34'; K. Chiba 54'

Umpires:
Angela Larío (ESP)
Mary Power (IRE)

25 March 2000
16:05

Great Britain	5–0	Russia
Sixsmith 2'; Wright 11', 26'; Cullen 12'; Marston-Smith 63'	Report

Umpires:
Jun Zhang (CHN)
Renée Chatas (USA)

25 March 2000
18:05

China	0–0	New Zealand
	Report

26 March 2000
16:05

Japan	1–2	Great Britain
Kato 25'	Report	Greenham 21'; Cullen 27'

Umpires:
Mary Power (IRE)
Ute Conen (GER)

27 March 2000
15:15

Russia	0–8	New Zealand
	Report	Smith 4', 21', 31'; Foy 7', 50', 62'; Pearce 40'; Lawrence 42'

Umpires:
Renée Chatas (USA)
Lee Mi-ok (KOR)

28 March 2000
16:05

China	1–0	Japan
Shen 58'	Report

Umpires:
Michelle Arnold (AUS)
Renée Chatas (USA)

28 March 2000
18:05

New Zealand	1–0	Great Britain
Smith 33'	Report

Umpires:
Angela Larío (ESP)
Mary Power (IRE)

29 March 2000
16:05

Japan	2–1	Russia
Iwao 10'; Matsui 61'	Report	Sviridova 36'

29 March 2000
18:05

Great Britain	1–0	China
Sixsmith 42'	Report

Umpires:
Jane Buchanan (RSA)
Ute Conen (GER)

=== Classification round ===
==== Ninth and tenth place ====
1 April 2000
10:05

India	1–2	Russia
Mamta 17'	Report	Sviridova 2'; Ioudovskaia 45'

Umpires:
Mary Power (IRE)
Janice McDonald (SCO)

==== Fifth to eighth place classification ====
Semi-finals
31 March 2000
United States	2
Japan	0
31 March 2000
China	1
Ireland	0

Final
1 April 2000
United States	0
China	2
Third Place
1 April 2000
Japan	3
Ireland	0

===== Crossover =====
31 March 2000
10:05

United States	2–0	Japan
Fillat 34'; James 41'	Report

Umpires:
Ute Conen (GER)
Michelle Arnold (AUS)

31 March 2000
12:35

China	1–0 (a.e.t.)	Ireland
Yang 84'	Report

Umpires:
Miriam van Gemert (NED)
Lee Mi-ok (KOR)

===== Seventh and eighth place =====
1 April 2000
12:45

Japan	3–0	Ireland
Morimoto 13'; Tsukui 24'; Miura 64'	Report

Umpires:
Renée Chatas (USA)
Jun Zhang (CHN)

===== Fifth and sixth place =====
1 April 2000
15:15

United States	0–2	China
	Report	Yang 6'; Chen Z. 11'

Umpires:
Michelle Arnold (AUS)
Jane Buchanan (RSA)

==== First to fourth place classification ====
Semi-finals
31 March 2000
Germany	1
New Zealand	2
31 March 2000
Great Britain	2
Spain	1

Final
2 April 2000
New Zealand	1
Great Britain	0
Third Place
2 April 2000
Germany	1
Spain	0

===== Semi-finals =====
31 March 2000
15:05

Germany	1–2	New Zealand
Klecker 10'	Report	Pearce 31'; Trolove 55'

Umpires:
Jane Nockolds (ENG)
Angela Larío (ESP)

31 March 2000
17:35

Great Britain	2–1	Spain
Wright 15'; Marston-Smith 28'	Report	Moreno 44'

Umpires:
Renée Chatas (USA)
Kazuko Yasueda (JPN)

===== Third and fourth place =====
2 April 2000
12:35

Germany	1–0	Spain
Klecker 69'	Report

Umpires:
Kazuko Yasueda (JPN)
Lee Mi-ok (KOR)

===== Final =====
2 April 2000
15:05

New Zealand	1–0	Great Britain
Pearce 25'	Report

Umpires:
Michelle Arnold (AUS)
Ute Conen (GER)

== Final standings ==
As per statistical convention in field hockey, matches decided in extra time are counted as wins and losses, while matches decided by penalty shoot-outs are counted as draws.

Pos	Team	Pld	W	D	L	GF	GA	GD	Pts	Status
1st place, gold medalist(s)	New Zealand	6	4	1	1	12	5	+7	13	Qualified for 2000 Summer Olympics
2nd place, silver medalist(s)	Great Britain (H)	6	4	0	2	10	4	+6	12	Qualified for 2000 Summer Olympics
3rd place, bronze medalist(s)	Germany	6	4	1	1	13	5	+8	13	Qualified for 2000 Summer Olympics
4	Spain	6	2	2	2	9	7	+2	8	Qualified for 2000 Summer Olympics
5	China	6	4	1	1	7	2	+5	13	Qualified for 2000 Summer Olympics
6	United States	6	2	2	2	8	10	−2	8	
7	Japan	6	3	0	3	10	6	+4	9	
8	Ireland	6	1	1	4	3	9	−6	4	
9	Russia	5	1	0	4	4	19	−15	3	
10	India	5	0	0	5	3	12	−9	0	

Source: Field Hockey
(H) Hosts

== Goalscorers ==
There were 79 goals scored in 29 matches, for an average of 2.72 goals per match.

4 goals

- (New Zealand) Amanda Smith

3 goals

- (China) Yang Huiping
- (Germany) Britta Becker
- (United Kingdom) Lucilla Wright
- (New Zealand) Kylie Foy
- (New Zealand) Suzanne Pearce
- (United States) Cindy Werley

2 goals

- (Germany) Nadine Ernsting-Krienke
- (Germany) Katrin Kauschke
- (Germany) Natascha Keller
- (Germany) Denise Klecker
- (United Kingdom) Tina Cullen
- (United Kingdom) Denise Marston-Smith
- (United Kingdom) Jane Sixsmith
- (India) Mamta Kharab
- (Japan) Sachimi Iwao
- (Japan) Akemi Kato
- (Russia) Tatiana Ioudovskaia
- (Russia) Irina Sviridova
- (Spain) Sonia Barrio
- (Spain) Núria Camón
- (Spain) Sonia de Ignacio-Simó

1 goal

- (China) Long Fengyu
- (China) Wang Jiuyan
- (China) Shen Lihong
- (China) Chen Zhaoxia
- (Germany) Inga Möller
- (Germany) Cornelia Reiter
- (United Kingdom) Fiona Greenham
- (India) Jyoti Sunita Kullu
- (Ireland) Rachael Kohler
- (Ireland) Kim Mills
- (Ireland) Karen O'Brien
- (Japan) Kaori Chiba
- (Japan) Aki Matsui
- (Japan) Keiko Miura
- (Japan) Sakae Morimoto
- (Japan) Naoko Saito
- (Japan) Toshie Tsukui
- (New Zealand) Anna Lawrence
- (New Zealand) Kate Trolove
- (Spain) Erdoitza Goikoetxea
- (Spain) Núria Moreno
- (Spain) Maider Tellería
- (United States) Kris Fillat
- (United States) Tracey Fuchs
- (United States) Kelli James
- (United States) Eleanor Race
- (United States) Michelle Vizzuso
