= 2000 Women's Hockey International Challenge =

Women's International Challenge
Tournament details
- Host country: Australia
- City: Sydney
- Dates: 1–8 July
- Teams: 3 (from 2 confederations)
- Venue: Olympic Hockey Stadium

Final positions
- Champions: Australia (3rd title)
- Runner-up: Germany
- Third place: New Zealand

Tournament statistics
- Matches played: 8
- Goals scored: 28 (3.5 per match)
- Top scorer: (Germany) Nadine Ernsting-Krienke (5 goals)

The 2000 Women's Hockey International Challenge was a women's field hockey tournament, consisting of a series of test matches. It was held in Sydney, Australia, from 1 to 8 July 2000.

Australia won the tournament, defeating Germany 3–0 in the final. New Zealand finished in third place.

== Competition format ==
The tournament featured the national teams of Australia, Germany and New Zealand, as well as a team from the Australian Institute of Sport. The teams competed in a double round-robin format, with each team playing each other twice. Three points were awarded for a win, one for a draw, and none for a loss.

== Officials ==
The following umpires were appointed by the International Hockey Federation to officiate the tournament:

- Michelle Arnold (AUS)
- Judith Barnesby (AUS)
- Ute Conen (GER)
- Lyn Farrell (NZL)
- Marelize de Klerk (RSA)

== Results ==
All times are local (AEST).

=== Preliminary round ===
Pos	Team	Pld	W	D	L	GF	GA	GD	Pts	Qualification
1	Australia (H)	4	2	1	1	10	4	+6	7	Advanced to Final
2	Germany	4	1	2	1	6	9	−3	5	Advanced to Final
3	New Zealand	4	1	1	2	6	9	−3	4	

Source: Hockey Australia
Rules for classification: 1) points; 2) goal difference; 3) goals scored; 4) head-to-head result.
(H) Hosts

==== Fixtures ====
1 July 2000
13:00

Germany	2–2	New Zealand
Ernsting-Krienke 19', 38'	Report	Foy 11'; Lawrence 49'

Umpires:
Michelle Arnold (AUS)
Judith Barnesby (AUS)

2 July 2000
13:00

Australia	1–1	Germany
Hawkes 21'	Report	Ernsting-Krienke 58'

Umpires:
Marelize de Klerk (RSA)
Lyn Farrell (NZL)

3 July 2000
14:00

New Zealand	3–0	Australia
Lawrence 12', 36', 37'	Report

Umpires:
Marelize de Klerk (RSA)
Ute Conen (GER)

4 July 2000
14:00

New Zealand	1–3	Germany
Foy 68'	Report	Ernsting-Krienke 1', 65'; Cremer 62'

Umpires:
Judith Barnesby (AUS)
Michelle Arnold (AUS)

5 July 2000
14:00

Germany	0–5	Australia
	Report	Annan 4', 57'; Mitchell-Taverner 33'; Hawkes 43'; Starre 61'

Umpires:
Lyn Farrell (NZL)
Marelize de Klerk (RSA)

6 July 2000
14:00

Australia	4–0	New Zealand
Morris 44', 62'; Smith 51'; Garard 68'	Report

Umpires:
Ute Conen (GER)
Marelize de Klerk (RSA)

=== Classification round ===
==== Exhibition match ====
- Note: Despite losing the match, New Zealand finished in third place as this was not a ranking match.

8 July 2000
11:00

New Zealand	0–3	Australia Development
	Report	Gallagher 11', 13'; K. Towers 34'

Umpires:
Judith Barnesby (AUS)
Ute Conen (GER)

==== Final ====
8 July 2000
13:00

Australia	3–0	Germany
K. Powell 49', 58'; Annan 66'	Report

Umpires:
Lyn Farrell (NZL)
Marelize de Klerk (RSA)

== Statistics ==
=== Final standings ===
1. Australia
2. Germany
3. New Zealand

=== Goalscorers ===
There were 28 goals scored in 8 matches, for an average of 3.5 goals per match.

5 goals

- (Germany) Nadine Ernsting-Krienke

4 goals

- (New Zealand) Anna Lawrence

3 goals

- (Australia) Alyson Annan

2 goals

- (Australia) Peta Gallagher **
- (Australia) Rechelle Hawkes
- (Australia) Jenn Morris
- (Australia) Katrina Powell
- (New Zealand) Kylie Foy

1 goal

- (Australia) Renita Garard
- (Australia) Claire Mitchell-Taverner
- (Australia) Karen Smith
- (Australia) Kate Starre
- (Australia) Kristen Towers **
- (Germany) Melanie Cremer

** = Denotes players in the Australian Development team.
