= 2003 Women's Hockey Champions Challenge =

International field hockey tournament

Tournament details
- Host country: Italy
- City: Catania
- Dates: 5 July – 13 July
- Teams: 6

Final positions
- Champions: Germany (1st title)
- Runner-up: Spain
- Third place: Japan

Tournament statistics
- Matches played: 18
- Goals scored: 66 (3.67 per match)
- Top scorer(s): (Japan) Tomomi Komori (United States) Kate Barber (New Zealand) Niniwa Roberts (5 goals)
- Best player: (Germany) Denise Klecker

The 2003 Women's Hockey Champions Challenge is the second tournament of the field hockey championship for women. It was held in Catania, on the island of Sicily in Italy from July 5–13, 2003.

== Squads ==
Germany

Head Coach: Peter Lemmen

1. Yvonne Frank (GK)
2. Julia Zwehl (GK)
3. Denise Klecker
5. Nadine Ernsting-Krienke
6. Anneke Böhmert
7. Natascha Keller
8. Melanie Cremer
9. Friederike Barth
10. Silke Müller
11. Cornelia Reiter
12. Caroline Casaretto
13. Marion Rodewald (C)
16. Fanny Rinne
18. Anke Kühn
20. Alexandra Kollmar
21. Badri Latif
22. Kerstin Hoyer
32. Franziska Gude
Italy

Head Coach: Picco Roberto

1. Roberta Lilliu (GK)
2. Stella Girotti
3. Enrica Tagliasacchi
4. Claudia Torretta
5. Victoria Corso
6. Lila Grasso
7. Giorgia Carradori
8. Sonia Scalia
9. Francesca Faustini
10. Laura Garcia
11. Alessandra Filippi
12. Anna Russo (GK)
14. Tatiana Nicoletti
15. Silvia Previgliano
16. Maltilde Canavosio
18. Dolores Miranda
21. Roberta Marrocu
22. Daniela Possali
Japan

Head Coach: Tsuda Toshiro

1. Rie Terazono (GK)
2. Keiko Miura (C)
3. Akemi Kato
4. Yukari Yamamoto
5. Sachimi Iwao
6. Chie Kimura
7. Yuka Ogura
8. Sakae Morimoto
10. Naoko Saito
11. Kayo Soga
12. Nami Miyazaki (GK)
15. Erika Esaki
17. Asuka Chiba
18. Tomomi Komori
19. Rika Komazawa
21. Rika Ishida
22. Yuko Kitano
23. Emi Sakurai
New Zealand

Head Coach: Ian Rutledge

1. Kayla Sharland
2. Nikki Grimwood
3. Paula Enoka
4. Jan Rowsell
5. Rachel Sutherland
6. Meredith Orr
8. Jaimee Provan
12. Karen McMillan
13. Jo Galletly
14. Suzie Pearce (C)
16. Helen Clarke (GK)
18. Diana Weavers
19. Melody Rowe
20. Amanda Christie
21. Niniwa Roberts
23. Tara Drysdale
26. Anita Wawatai (GK)
28. Karen Syddall
Spain

Head Coach: Jack Holtman

1. María Jesús Rosa (GK)
2. Silvia Manrique
3. Olalla Piñeiro
5. Mónica Rueda
6. Silvia Bonastre
7. María del Carmen Martín
8. Marta Prat
9. Silvia Muñoz
10. Lucía López
11. María del Mar Feito
12. Maider Tellería
14. Rocío Ybarra
15. Erdoitza Goikoetxea
17. Núria Camón
18. Ana Pérez
19. Isabel Barguño (GK)
20. Raquel Huertas
21. Esther Termens
United States

Head Coach: Beth Anders

1. Tamika Smith
2. Kristen McCann
4. Margaret Storrar (GK)
5. Tara Jelley
6. Robyn Kenney
7. Tracey Larson
8. Kelli Gannon
9. Tracey Fuchs
11. Katie Beach (C)
12. Dina Rizzo
13. Keli Smith
15. Jill Reeve
17. Carrie Lingo
19. Abbey Woolley
21. Natalie Dawson
22. Kate Barber
25. Amy Tran (GK)
26. Jessica Coleman

== Umpires ==
Below is the eight umpires appointed by International Hockey Federation (FIH):

- Corrine Cormelius (RSA)
- Carolina de la Fuente (ARG)
- Jean Duncan (SCO)
- Jun Zhang Kentwell (USA)
- Petra Müller (GER)
- Jane Nockolds (ENG)
- Gina Spitaleri (ITA)
- Cristina Tonetta (ITA)

== Results ==
All times are Central European Summer Time (UTC+02:00)

=== Pool matches ===
Pos	Team	Pld	W	D	L	GF	GA	GD	Pts	Qualification
1	Germany	5	4	1	0	13	4	+9	13	Final
2	Spain	5	3	2	0	8	3	+5	11	Final
3	Japan	5	3	1	1	16	8	+8	10	
4	New Zealand	5	2	0	3	5	5	0	6	
5	United States	5	1	0	4	9	13	−4	3	
6	Italy	5	0	0	5	3	21	−18	0	

Source: FIH
Rules for classification: 1) points; 2) goal difference; 3) goals scored; 4) head-to-head result.

==== Fixtures ====
5 July 2003
17:00

Japan	2–1	New Zealand
Iwao 39'; Komori 43'	Report	Roberts 60'

Umpires:
Jean Duncan (SCO)
Carolina de la Fuente (ARG)

5 July 2003
19:00

United States	1–2	Spain
Reeve 58'	Report	Camón 7'; Muñoz 17'

Umpires:
Gina Spitaleri (ITA)
Petra Müller (GER)

5 July 2003
21:00

Italy	0–5	Germany
	Report	Böhmert 4', 70'; Barth 21'; Ernsting-Krienke 40'; Hoyer 63'

Umpires:
Jane Nockolds (ENG)
Jun Kentwell (USA)

6 July 2003
17:00

New Zealand	2–0	United States
Roberts 36', 39'	Report

Umpires:
Gina Spitaleri (ITA)
Corrine Cornelius (RSA)

6 July 2003
19:00

Germany	3–2	Japan
Reiter 16'; Rinne 44'; Müller 69'	Report	Miura 38'; Komazawa 40'

Umpires:
Cristina Tonetta (ITA)
Jane Nockolds (ENG)

6 July 2003
21:00

Spain	3–0	Italy
Goikoetxea 10'; Huertas 23'; Camón 51'	Report

Umpires:
Petra Müller (GER)
Jean Duncan (SCO)

8 July 2003
19:00

Japan	1–1	Spain
Miura 68'	Report	Huertas 65'

Umpires:
Jun Kentwell (USA)
Petra Müller (GER)

8 July 2003
21:00

Italy	3–4	United States
Miranda 5'; García 18'; Filippí 30'	Report	Larson 2'; Fuchs 7', 33'; Barber 20'

Umpires:
Corrine Cornelius (RSA)
Carolina de la Fuente (ARG)

9 July 2003
19:00

United States	1–2	Germany
Barber 13'	Report	Ernsting-Krienke 26'; Reiter 70'

Umpires:
Jane Nockolds (ENG)
Gina Spitaleri (ITA)

9 July 2003
21:00

Spain	1–0	New Zealand
Pérez 5'	Report

Umpires:
Jean Duncan (SCO)
Cristina Tonetta (ITA)

10 July 2003
19:00

New Zealand	0–2	Germany
	Report	Böhmert 20'; Keller 29'

Umpires:
Jun Kentwell (USA)
Carolina de la Fuente (ARG)

10 July 2003
21:00

Japan	7–0	Italy
Saito 8', 53'; Komori 21', 68'; Morimoto 57'; Komazawa 58', 62'	Report

Umpires:
Corrine Cornelius (RSA)
Jean Duncan (SCO)

12 July 2003
15:00

Germany	1–1	Spain
Kollmar 39'	Report	Goikoetxea 7'

Umpires:
Gina Spitaleri (ITA)
Jun Kentwell (USA)

12 July 2003
17:00

United States	3–4	Japan
Jelley 9'; Smith 14'; Barber 16'	Report	Miura 2', 39'; Morimoto 10'; Komori 22'

Umpires:
Carolina de la Fuente (ARG)
Cristina Tonetta (ITA)

12 July 2003
19:00

Italy	0–2	New Zealand
	Report	Roberts 39'; Sharland 57'

Umpires:
Petra Müller (GER)
Jane Nockolds (ENG)

=== Classification matches ===
==== Fifth and sixth place ====
13 July 2003
16:00

United States	4–1	Italy
Barber 14', 32'; Gannon 50', 65'	Report	Miranda 17'

Umpires:
Jane Nockolds (ENG)
Corrine Cornelius (RSA)

==== Third and fourth place ====
13 July 2003
18:30

Japan	2–1	New Zealand
Morimoto 2'; Komori 16'	Report	Roberts 34'

Umpires:
Jun Kentwell (USA)
Cristina Tonetta (ITA)

==== Final ====
13 July 2003
21:00

Germany	3–1	Spain
Klecker 10'; Ernsting-Krienke 62', 70'	Report	Camón 37'

Umpires:
Jean Duncan (SCO)
Gina Spitaleri (ITA)

== Awards ==
Player of the Tournament	Top Goalscorers	Goalkeeper of the Tournament
(Germany) Denise Klecker	Three players (see list below)	(United States) Margaret Storrar

== Statistics ==
=== Final standings ===
Pos	Team	Pld	W	D	L	GF	GA	GD	Pts	Qualification
1st place, gold medalist(s)	Germany	6	5	1	0	16	5	+11	16	Qualified for FIH Champions Trophy
2nd place, silver medalist(s)	Spain	6	3	2	1	9	6	+3	11	
3rd place, bronze medalist(s)	Japan	6	4	1	1	18	9	+9	13	
4	New Zealand	6	2	0	4	6	7	−1	6	
5	United States	6	2	0	4	13	14	−1	6	
6	Italy	6	0	0	6	4	25	−21	0	

Source: FIH

=== Goalscorers ===
There were 66 goals scored in 18 matches, for an average of 3.67 goals per match.

5 goals

- (Japan) Tomomi Komori
- (New Zealand) Niniwa Roberts
- (United States) Kate Barber

4 goals

- (Germany) Nadine Ernsting-Krienke
- (Japan) Keiko Miura

3 goals

- (Germany) Anneke Böhmert
- (Japan) Sakae Morimoto
- (Japan) Rika Komazawa
- (Spain) Núria Camón

2 goals

- (Germany) Cornelia Reiter
- (Italy) Dolores Miranda
- (Japan) Naoko Saito
- (Spain) Erdoitza Goikoetxea
- (Spain) Raquel Huertas
- (United States) Tracey Fuchs
- (United States) Kelli Gannon

1 goal

- (Germany) Friederike Barth
- (Germany) Kerstin Hoyer
- (Germany) Natascha Keller
- (Germany) Denise Klecker
- (Germany) Alexandra Kollmar
- (Germany) Silke Müller
- (Germany) Fanny Rinne
- (Italy) Alessandra Filippí
- (Italy) Laura García
- (Japan) Sachimi Iwao
- (New Zealand) Kayla Sharland
- (Spain) Silvia Muñoz
- (Spain) Ana Pérez
- (United States) Tara Jelley
- (United States) Tracey Larson
- (United States) Jill Reeve
- (United States) Keli Smith
