= 1997 Women's Hockey Champions Trophy =

Field hockey tournament

Tournament details
- Host country: Germany
- City: Berlin
- Teams: 6

Final positions
- Champions: Australia (4th title)
- Runner-up: Germany
- Third place: Netherlands

Tournament statistics
- Matches played: 18
- Goals scored: 56 (3.11 per match)
- Top scorer: (Australia) Alyson Annan (5 goals)

The 1997 Women's Hockey Champions Trophy was the 6th edition of the Hockey Champions Trophy for women. It was held between 1–8 June 1997 in Berlin, Germany. From this edition on a win was rewarded with three points instead of two, and a draw with one point.

Australia won the tournament for the fourth consecutive time after defeating Germany 2–1 in the final with a golden goal.

== Teams ==
The participating teams were determined by International Hockey Federation (FIH):

- Australia (defending champions, champions of 1996 Summer Olympics and 1994 World Cup)
- Germany (host nation)
- South Korea (second in 1996 Summer Olympics)
- Great Britain (third in 1996 Summer Olympics)
- Netherlands (fourth in 1996 Summer Olympics)
- United States (fifth in 1996 Summer Olympics)

== Squads ==
Australia

Head Coach: Ric Charlesworth

1. Jenn Morris (c)
2. Katrina Powell
3. Michelle Andrews
4. Karen Smith
5. Renita Garard
6. Katie Allen
7. Kate Starre
8. Rechelle Hawkes (c)
9. Claire Mitchell-Taverner
10. Louise Dobson
11. Tammy Cole
12. Alyson Annan
13. Nikki Mott
14. Juliet Haslam
15. Clover Maitland (GK)
16. Rachel Imison (GK)
Germany

Head Coach: Berti Rauth

1. Alexandra Schmidt (GK)
2. Julia Zwehl (GK)
3. Susanne Müller
4. Tanja Dickenscheid
5. Nadine Ernsting-Krienke
6. Inga Möller
7. Natascha Keller
8. Melanie Cremer
9. Denise Klecker
10. Badri Latif
11. Birgit Mensch
12. Britta Becker
13. Marion Rodewald
14. Philippa Suxdorf
15. Heike Lätzsch
16. Katrin Kauschke (c)
Great Britain
1. Hilary Rose (GK)
2. Carolyn Reid (GK)
3. Sarah Blanks
4. Kirsty Bowden
5. Karen Brown
6. Lisa Copeland
7. Tina Cullen
8. Mandy Davies (c)
9. Jackie Empson
10. Denise Marston-Smith
11. Purdy Miller
12. Joanne Mould
13. Lucy Newcombe
14. Jane Smith
15. Jane Sixsmith
16. Lucilla Wright
Netherlands

Head Coach: Tom van 't Hek

1. Stella de Heij (GK)
2. Daphne Touw (GK)
3. Inge van den Broek
4. Julie Deiters
5. Ellen Kuipers
6. Myrna Veenstra
7. Nicole Koolen
8. Dillianne van den Boogaard
9. Willemijn Duyster
10. Hanneke Smabers
11. Ageeth Boomgaardt
12. Wendy Fortuin
13. Eefke Mulder
14. Carole Thate (c)
15. Fleur van de Kieft
16. Suzan van der Wielen
South Korea
1. You Jae-sook (GK)
2. Kim Eun-jin
3. Cho Eun-jung (c)
4. Park Ok-nam
5. Choi Eun-kyung
6. Kim Myung-ok
7. Back Young-ok
8. Choi Kwan-sook
9. Choi Mi-soon
10. Lee Ji-young
11. Kim Soo-jung
12. Lee Kyung-ahn
13. Oh Seung-shin
14. Park Eun-kyung
15. Lee Eun-young
16. Jim Deok-san (GK)
United States

Head Coach: Pam Hixon

1. Jennifer Salisbury
2. Carla Tagliente
3. Liz Tchou
4. Margaret Storrar (GK)
5. Meredith Thorpe
6. Chris DeBow
7. Kristen Holmes
8. Kelli James
9. Tracey Fuchs
10. Carolyn Schwarz
11. Katie Kauffman
12. Andrea Wieland (GK)
13. Rose Aspelin
14. Pam Neiss
15. Jill Reeve (c)
16. Tara Maguire

== Umpires ==
Below are the 10 umpires appointed by the International Hockey Federation:

- Judith Barnersby (AUS)
- Renée Chatas (USA)
- Gill Clarke (GBR)
- Renée Cohen (NED)
- Carola Heinrichs (GER)
- Masako Kamisuki (JPN)
- Lee Mi-ok (KOR)
- Ute Löwenstein-Conen (GER)
- Gina Spitaleri (ITA)

== Results ==
All times are Central European Summer Time (UTC+02:00)

=== Pool ===
Pos	Team	Pld	W	D	L	GF	GA	GD	Pts	Qualification
1	Germany	5	3	2	0	11	5	+6	11	Final
2	Australia	5	3	1	1	13	4	+9	10	Final
3	South Korea	5	3	0	2	9	6	+3	9	
4	Netherlands	5	2	0	3	4	6	−2	6	
5	United States	5	1	1	3	4	12	−8	4	
6	Great Britain	5	1	0	4	2	10	−8	3	

Source: FIH
Rules for classification: 1) points; 2) goal difference; 3) goals scored; 4) head-to-head result.

1 June 1997
14:00

South Korea	0–1	United States
	Report	Tagliente 39'

Umpires:
Judith Barnesby (AUS)
Renée Cohen (NED)

1 June 1997
16:00

Netherlands	1–0	Great Britain
Kuipers 16'	Report

Umpires:
Carola Heinrichs (GER)
Masako Kamisuki (JPN)

1 June 1997
18:00

Australia	1–1	Germany
Annan 28'	Report	Becker 61'

Umpires:
Renée Chatas (USA)
Gill Clarke (GBR)

2 June 1997
16:00

Great Britain	0–2	South Korea
	Report	Choi E. 60'; Lee J. 68'

Umpires:
Ute Löwenstein-Conen (GER)
Renée Cohen (NED)

2 June 1997
18:00

United States	2–2	Germany
Maguire 47'; James 61'	Report	Möller 17'; Keller 39'

Umpires:
Judith Barnesby (AUS)
Gina Spitaleri (ITA)

2 June 1997
20:00

Netherlands	0–2	Australia
	Report	Annan 34'; Morris 49'

Umpires:
Carola Heinrichs (GER)
Lee Mi-ok (KOR)

4 June 1997
16:00

Netherlands	3–0	United States
Van de Kieft 5', 13'; Van der Wielen 53'	Report

Umpires:
Gill Clarke (GBR)
Lee Mi-ok (KOR)

4 June 1997
18:00

Germany	3–2	South Korea
Ernsting-Krienke 4'; Klecker 16'; Lätzsch 54'	Report	Choi M. 11'; Park 32'

Umpires:
Gina Spitaleri (ITA)
Renée Chatas (USA)

4 June 1997
20:00

Great Britain	0–3	Australia
	Report	Smith 20'; Morris 28'; Andrews 50'

Umpires:
Ute Löwenstein-Conen (GER)
Masako Kamisuki (JPN)

5 June 1997
16:00

South Korea	2–0	Netherlands
Park 18'; Choi K. 68'	Report

Umpires:
Judith Barnesby (AUS)
Ute Löwenstein-Conen (GER)

5 June 1997
18:00

Germany	3–0	Great Britain
Keller 24'; Kauschke 52'; Lätzsch 59'	Report

Umpires:
Renée Cohen (NED)
Renée Chatas (USA)

5 June 1997
20:00

Australia	5–0	United States
Annan 2'; Morris 22', 47'; Powell 55'; Mott 57'	Report

Umpires:
Carola Heinrichs (GER)
Gina Spitaleri (ITA)

7 June 1997
12:00

United States	1–2	Great Britain
Tagliente 21'	Report	Sixsmith 11'; Marston-Smith 32'

Umpires:
Lee Mi-ok (KOR)
Renée Cohen (NED)

7 June 1997
14:00

South Korea	3–2	Australia
Choi M. 24'; Lee J. 45'; Kim M. 69'	Report	Powell 24'; Annan 61'

Umpires:
Carola Heinrichs (GER)
Ute Löwenstein-Conen (GER)

7 June 1997
16:00

Germany	2–0	Netherlands
Ernsting-Krienke 46'; Klecker 55'	Report

Umpires:
Gill Clarke (GBR)
Judith Barnesby (AUS)

=== Classification ===
==== Fifth and sixth place ====
8 June 1997
11:00

United States	0–3	Great Britain
	Report	Brown 16'; Smith 64'; Miller 65'

Umpires:
Ute Löwenstein-Conen (GER)
Gina Spitaleri (ITA)

==== Third and fourth place ====
8 June 1997
13:30

South Korea	2–5	Netherlands
Choi M. 13', 43'	Report	Thate 9'; Van der Wielen 29', 41', 56'; Van de Kieft 59'

Umpires:
Judith Barnesby (AUS)
Renée Chatas (USA)

=== Final ===
8 June 1997
16:00

Germany	1–2 (a.e.t.)	Australia
Becker 3'	Report	Powell 8'; Annan 78'

Umpires:
Gill Clarke (GBR)
Renée Cohen (NED)

== Statistics ==
=== Final standings ===
1. Australia
2. Germany
3. Netherlands
4. South Korea
5. Great Britain
6. United States

=== Goalscorers ===
There were 56 goals scored in 18 matches, for an average of 3.11 goals per match.

5 goals

- (Australia) Alyson Annan

4 goals

- (Australia) Jenn Morris
- (Netherlands) Suzan van der Wielen
- (South Korea) Choi Mi-Soon

3 goals

- (Australia) Katrina Powell
- (Netherlands) Fleur van de Kieft

2 goals

- (Germany) Britta Becker
- (Germany) Nadine Ernsting-Krienke
- (Germany) Natascha Keller
- (Germany) Denise Klecker
- (Germany) Heike Lätzsch
- (South Korea) Park Eun-Kyung
- (South Korea) Lee Ji-Young
- (United States) Carla Tagliente

1 goal

- (Australia) Michelle Andrews
- (Australia) Nikki Mott
- (Australia) Karen Smith
- (Germany) Katrin Kauschke
- (Germany) Inga Möller
- (United Kingdom) Karen Brown
- (United Kingdom) Denise Marston-Smith
- (United Kingdom) Purdy Miller
- (United Kingdom) Jane Sixsmith
- (United Kingdom) Jane Smith
- (Netherlands) Ellen Kuipers
- (Netherlands) Carole Thate
- (South Korea) Choi Eun-kyung
- (South Korea) Choi Kwan-sook
- (South Korea) Kim Myung-ok
- (United States) Kelli James
- (United States) Tara Maguire

Source: FIH
