= Minke Smeets =

Dutch field hockey player

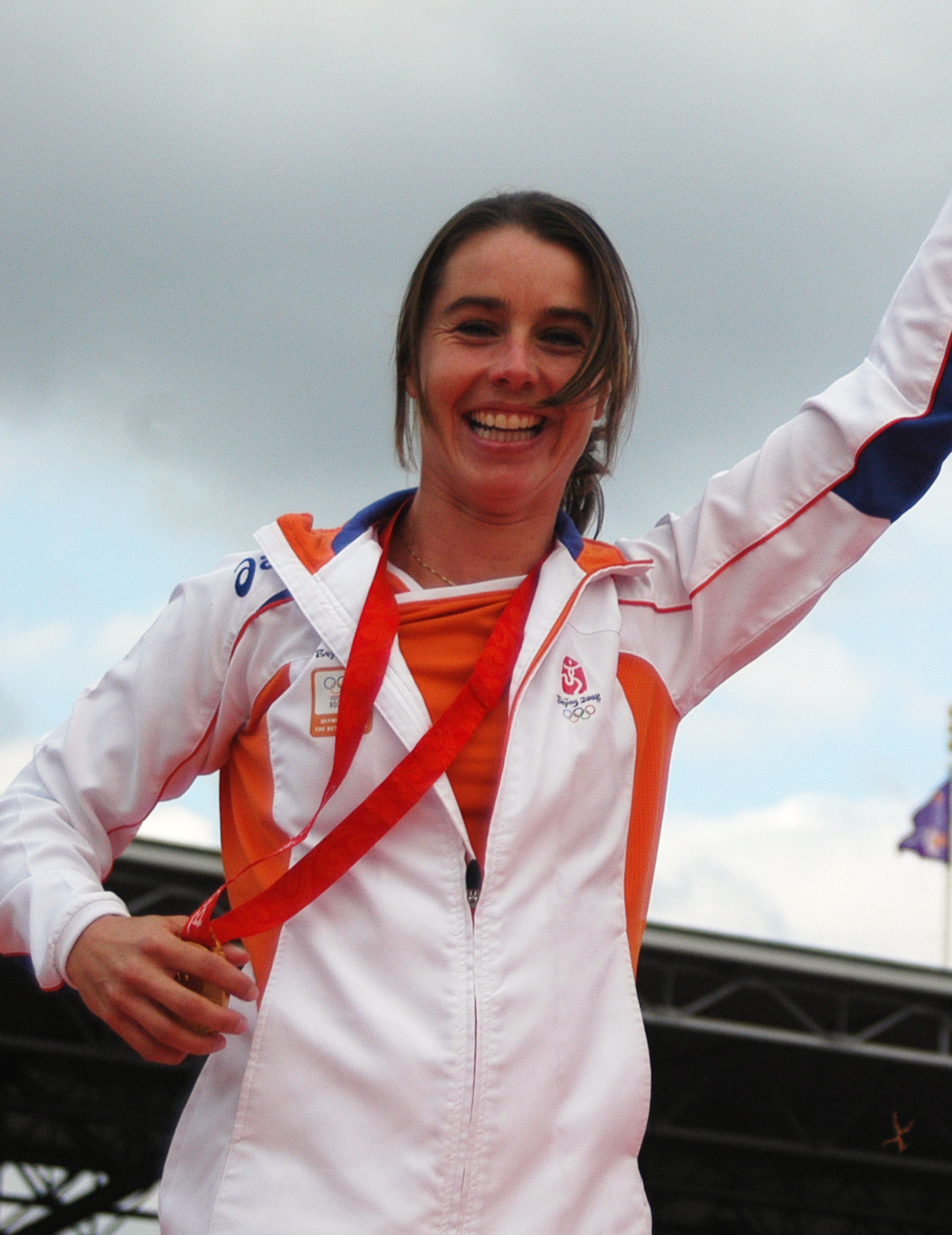

Medal record

Women's field hockey

Representing the Netherlands

Olympic Games
Gold medal – first place	2008 Beijing	Team competition
Silver medal – second place	2004 Athens	Team competition
Bronze medal – third place	2000 Sydney	Team competition

World Cup
Gold medal – first place	2006 Madrid	Team competition
Silver medal – second place	1998 Utrecht	Team competition
Silver medal – second place	2002 Perth	Team competition
Silver medal – second place	2010 Rosario	Team competition

European Championship
Gold medal – first place	1999 Cologne	Team competition
Gold medal – first place	2005 Dublin	Team competition
Silver medal – second place	2007 Manchester	Team competition

Champions Trophy
Gold medal – first place	2000 Amstelveen	Team competition
Gold medal – first place	2004 Rosario	Team competition
Gold medal – first place	2007 Quilmes	Team competition
Silver medal – second place	1999 Brisbane	Team competition
Silver medal – second place	2001 Amstelveen	Team competition
Bronze medal – third place	1997 Berlin	Team competition
Bronze medal – third place	2002 Macau	Team competition
Bronze medal – third place	2003 Sydney	Team competition
Bronze medal – third place	2006 Amstelveen	Team competition
Bronze medal – third place	2008 M'gladbach	Team competition

Minke Smeets (née Smabers; born 22 March 1979 in The Hague, South Holland) is a field hockey midfielder. She plays professional field hockey with the Hoofdklasse side Laren and won three medals with the Netherlands national team at the Summer Olympics.

She was part of the national team that won the 2007 Champions Trophy. During the Champions Trophy she became the all-time record holder in caps for the national team, wearing the orange jersey for the 235th time in her career in the final, breaking Mijntje Donners' record. She won an Olympic gold medal with the Dutch team by beating China in the final of the 2008 Summer Olympics in Beijing.

During the closing ceremony of the 2008 Olympics, Smeets' boyfriend, Dutch baseball player Tjerk Smeets, proposed, and she accepted. Her older sister Hanneke was also a Dutch international who won the bronze medal in the 2000 Summer Olympics.
