= Moira Senior =

New Zealand field hockey player

Personal information
- Born: 22 July 1976 (age 49)
Medal record
Women's field hockey
Representing New Zealand
Commonwealth Games
Bronze medal – third place	1998 Kuala Lumpur	Team

Moira Anita Senior (born 22 July 1976 in New Plymouth, New Zealand) is a field hockey striker from New Zealand, who finished sixth with her national team at the 2000 Summer Olympics in Sydney. She competed at the Commonwealth Games either side of the Sydney Olympics, at the 1998 Commonwealth Games in Kuala Lumpur and the 2002 Commonwealth Games in Manchester. Injury suspended her career until a return to international hockey in late 2004 when she was named in the Champions Trophy side after completing the 2004 NHL as one of the top goal scorers. She scored eight goals for the Central Mysticks, who won the women's title.

Senior missed selection for the US tour in May 2005 to make way for developing players but was recalled to the side for the Champions Challenge in Virginia Beach in July. A shin injury prevented her from making the trip. She is one out of three players who survived from the Sydney team. The others are Diana Weavers and Suzie Muirhead.

== International senior competitions ==
- 1998 – World Cup, Utrecht
- 1998 – Commonwealth Games, Kuala Lumpur
- 1999 – Champions Trophy, Brisbane
- 2000 – Olympic Qualifying Tournament, Milton Keynes
- 2000 – Champions Trophy, Amstelveen
- 2000 – Summer Olympics, Sydney
- 2002 – Commonwealth Games, Manchester
- 2004 – Champions Trophy, Rosario
