= Carla Tagliente =

American field hockey player

Carla Tagliente (born January 2, 1979, in Marathon, New York) is a former field hockey striker from the United States, who earned a total number of 78 caps for the Women's National Team, in which she scored five goals. The former student of the University of Maryland, where she played for the Terrapins, scored her first international goal in her first international appearance, versus South Korea (1-0) at the 1997 Champions Trophy in Berlin, Germany. Tagliente retired in April 2003.

== International senior tournaments ==
- 1997 – Champions Trophy, Berlin, Germany (6th)
- 1999 – Pan American Games, Winnipeg, Canada (2nd)
- 2000 – Olympic Qualifying Tournament, Milton Keynes, England (6th)
- 2001 – Pan America Cup, Kingston, Jamaica (2nd)
- 2002 – Champions Challenge, Johannesburg, South Africa (5th)
- 2002 – 10th World Cup, Perth, Australia (9th)
