= Margaret Storrar =

American field hockey player

Margaret ("Peggy") Storrar (born February 20, 1971, in Mahopac, New York) is a field hockey goalkeeper from the United States, who made her international senior debut for the Women's National Team in 1995. The former student of the University of North Carolina at Chapel Hill was a member of the team, that won the silver medal at the 1999 Pan American Games in Winnipeg, Manitoba, Canada. Four years later, when Santo Domingo, Dominican Republic hosted the Pan Am Games, Storrur repeated that feat.

== International senior tournaments ==
- 1997 – Champions Trophy, Berlin, Germany (6th)
- 1998 – World Cup, Utrecht, The Netherlands (8th)
- 1999 – Pan American Games, Winnipeg, Canada (2nd)
- 2000 – Olympic Qualifying Tournament, Milton Keynes, England (6th)
- 2001 – Pan American Cup, Kingston, Jamaica (2nd)
- 2002 – Champions Challenge, Johannesburg, South Africa (5th)
- 2002 – World Cup, Perth, Australia (9th)
- 2003 – Champions Challenge, Catania, Italy (5th)
- 2003 – Pan American Games, Santo Domingo, Dominican Republic (2nd)
- 2004 – Olympic Qualifying Tournament, Auckland, New Zealand (6th)
