= Marion Rodewald =

German field hockey player

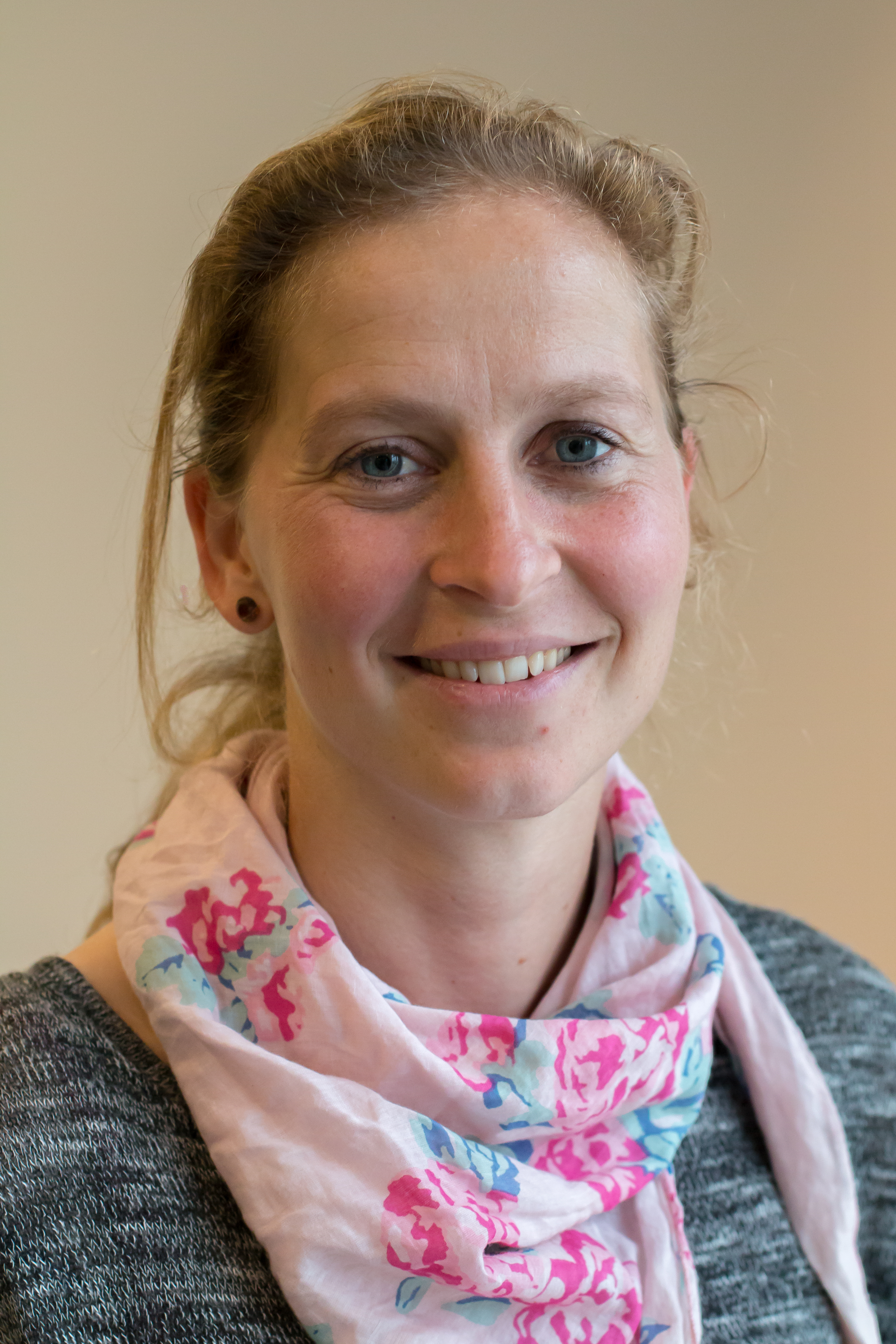
- Rodewald in 2014

Personal information
- Born: 24 December 1976 (age 49) Mülheim an der Ruhr
- Height: 164 cm (5 ft 5 in)
- Weight: 54 kg (119 lb)

Sport
- Sport: Field hockey
Medal record
Women's field hockey
Representing Germany
Olympic Games
Gold medal – first place	2004 Athens	Team
World Cup
Bronze medal – third place	1998 Utrecht	Team
European Championship
Gold medal – first place	2007 Manchester	Team
Silver medal – second place	1999 Cologne	Team
Champions Trophy
Silver medal – second place	1997 Berlin	Team
Silver medal – second place	2000 Amstelveen	Team
Silver medal – second place	2004 Rosario	Team
Silver medal – second place	2008 Mönchengladbach	Team
Bronze medal – third place	1999 Brisbane	Team
Champions Challenge
Gold medal – first place	Catania 2003	Team

Marion Rodewald (born 24 December 1976 in Mülheim an der Ruhr, North Rhine-Westphalia) is a field hockey defender from Germany, who won the gold medal with the German National Women's Team at the 2004 Summer Olympics in Athens, Greece.

== International senior tournaments ==
- 1996 – Indoor European Nations Cup, Glasgow (1st place)
- 1997 – Champions Trophy, Berlin (2nd place)
- 1998 – World Cup, Utrecht (3rd place)
- 1999 – Champions Trophy, Brisbane (3rd place)
- 1999 – European Nations Cup, Cologne (2nd place)
- 2000 – Olympic Qualifying Tournament, Milton Keynes (3rd place)
- 2000 – Champions Trophy, Amstelveen (2nd place)
- 2000 – Summer Olympics, Sydney (7th place)
- 2002 – World Cup, Perth (7th place)
- 2003 – Champions Challenge, Catania (1st place)
- 2003 – European Nations Cup, Barcelona (3rd place)
- 2004 – Olympic Qualifier, Auckland (4th place)
- 2004 – Summer Olympics, Athens (1st place)
- 2004 – Champions Trophy, Rosario (2nd place)
- 2005 – Champions Trophy, Canberra (5th place)
- 2006 – World Cup, Madrid (8th place)
- 2007 – European Nations Cup, Manchester (1st place)
- 2008 – Champions Trophy, Mönchengladbach (2nd place)
- 2008 – Summer Olympics, Beijing (4th place)
