= Myrna Veenstra =

Dutch field hockey player

Personal information
- Born: 4 March 1975 (age 51) Goes, Netherlands
Medal record
Women's field hockey
Representing the Netherlands
Olympic Games
| Bronze medal – third place | 2000 Sydney | Team competition |
Champions Trophy
| Bronze medal – third place | 1997 Berlin | Team competition |
| Silver medal – second place | 1999 Brisbane | Team competition |
| Gold medal – first place | 2000 Amstelveen | Team competition |
European Championship
| Gold medal – first place | 1999 Cologne | Team Competition |

Myrna Veenstra (born 4 March 1975) is a former field hockey player from the Netherlands. She was born in Goes and played 79 international matches for the Netherlands as a defender. During her international career, she scored one goal.

Veenstra was a member of the Netherlands squad that won the bronze medal at the 2000 Summer Olympics in Sydney. She made her first international appearance on 6 February 1997 in a friendly against South Africa. Her last match for the Dutch Women's Team came on 29 September 2000, when they faced Spain (2-0) during the bronze medal match at the Sydney Olympics.
