= Margje Teeuwen =

Dutch field hockey player

Personal information
- Born: 21 May 1974 (age 52)
Medal record
Women's field hockey
Representing the Netherlands
Olympic Games
Bronze medal – third place	1996 Atlanta	Team competition
Bronze medal – third place	2000 Sydney	Team competition
World Cup
Silver medal – second place	1998 Utrecht	Team Competition
Champions Trophy
Gold medal – first place	2000 Amstelveen	Team Competition
Silver medal – second place	1999 Brisbane	Team Competition
European Nations Cup
Gold medal – first place	1995 Amstelveen	Team Competition
Gold medal – first place	1999 Cologne	Team Competition

Margje Josepha Teeuwen (born 21 May 1974 in Eindhoven, North Brabant) is a field hockey midfielder from the Netherlands, who played 145 international matches for the Dutch National Women's Team, in which she scored fifteen goals.

Teeuwen twice won the Olympic bronze medal, in 1996 and 2000, and retired from international competition after the Sydney Games. She is married to Dutch DJRob Stenders. He has his own radiostation on the internet called KX Radio. Teeuwen also has a program on this station.
