= Julie Deiters =

Dutch field hockey player

Personal information
- Born: 4 September 1975 (age 50)
Medal record
Women's field hockey
Representing the Netherlands
Olympic Games
Bronze medal – third place	2000 Sydney	Team
World Cup
Silver medal – second place	1998 Utrecht	Team
Champions Trophy
Gold medal – first place	2000 Amstelveen	Team
Silver medal – second place	1999 Brisbane	Team
Silver medal – second place	2001 Amstelveen	Team
Bronze medal – third place	1997 Berlin	Team
European Championship
Gold medal – first place	1999 Cologne	Team

Julie Bénédicte Deiters (born 4 September 1975 in Meudon) is a French-born former Dutch field hockey player. She played 166 international matches for the Netherlands, in which the defender scored fourteen goals.

Deiters was a member of the Netherlands squad that won the bronze medal at the 2000 Summer Olympics in Sydney. A player from Amsterdam, Deiters made her debut on 4 February 1997 in a friendly against South Africa. Her last match for the Dutch Women's Team came on 26 August 2001, when she faced Argentina (2-3) during the Champions Trophy in Amstelveen.
