= Clarinda Sinnige =

Dutch field hockey player

Personal information
- Full name: Clarinda Maria Sinnige
- Born: January 14, 1973 (age 53) Amsterdam, North Holland
Medal record
Women's field hockey
Representing the Netherlands
Olympic Games
Silver medal – second place	2004 Athens	Team competition
Bronze medal – third place	2000 Sydney	Team competition
World Cup
Silver medal – second place	1998 Utrecht	Team Competition
Silver medal – second place	2002 Perth	Team Competition
Champions Trophy
Gold medal – first place	2000 Amstelveen	Team Competition
Silver medal – second place	1999 Brisbane	Team Competition
Silver medal – second place	2001 Amstelveen	Team Competition
Bronze medal – third place	2002 Macau	Team Competition
Bronze medal – third place	2003 Sydney	Team Competition
European Championship
Gold medal – first place	1999 Cologne	Team Competition

Clarinda Maria Sinnige (born January 14, 1973, in Amsterdam, North Holland) is a former field hockey goalkeeper from the Netherlands, who played 142 international matches for the Dutch national team.

A player from Amsterdam, Sinnige made her debut on July 5, 1997, against Canada, and was a member of the team that won bronze at the 2000 Summer Olympics and silver at the 2004 Summer Olympics. She retired from international competition after the Athens Games.
