= Julia Zwehl =

German hockey player

Personal information
- Born: 20 March 1976 (age 50) Hanover, Lower Saxony, West Germany
- Height: 167 cm (5 ft 6 in)
- Weight: 60 kg (132 lb)

Sport
- Sport: Field hockey
- Position: Goalkeeper
Senior career
Years	Team	Caps	Goals
–	Eintracht Braunschweig	-	-
National team
Years	Team	Caps	Goals
1997–2005	Germany	93	(1)
Medal record
Women's Field Hockey
Representing Germany
Olympic Games
Gold medal – first place	2004 Athens	Team Competition
World Cup
Bronze medal – third place	1998 Utrecht	Team competition
Champions Trophy
Silver medal – second place	1997 Berlin	Team competition
Silver medal – second place	2000 Amstelveen	Team competition
Bronze medal – third place	1999 Brisbane	Team competition
European Championship
Silver medal – second place	1999 Cologne	Team competition
Champions Challenge
Gold medal – first place	2003 Catania	Team competition

Julia Zwehl (born 20 March 1976) is a former field hockey international from Germany. She played as goalkeeper and was a member of the German gold medal winning team at the 2004 Olympics in Athens. Zwehl, nicknamed Zorro, played for Eintracht Braunschweig. In total, she represented Germany in 93 matches.

== International senior tournaments ==
- 1997 – Champions Trophy, Berlin (2nd)
- 1998 – World Hockey Cup, Utrecht (3rd)
- 1998 – European Indoor Nations Cup, Vienna (1st)
- 1999 – Champions Trophy, Brisbane (3rd)
- 1999 – European Nations Cup, Cologne (2nd)
- 2000 – Olympic Qualifier, Milton Keynes (3rd)
- 2000 – Champions Trophy, Amstelveen (2nd)
- 2000 – Olympic Games, Sydney (7th)
- 2003 – Champions Challenge, Catania (1st)
- 2003 – European Nations Cup, Barcelona (3rd)
- 2004 – Olympic Qualifier, Auckland (4th)
- 2004 – Olympic Games, Athens (1st)
