= Fleur van de Kieft =

Dutch field hockey player

Personal information
- Born: 22 October 1973 (age 52)
Medal record
Women's field hockey
Representing the Netherlands
Olympic Games
Bronze medal – third place	1996 Atlanta	Team competition
Bronze medal – third place	2000 Sydney	Team competition
World Cup
Silver medal – second place	1998 Utrecht	Team Competition
Champions Trophy
Gold medal – first place	2000 Amstelveen	Team Competition
Silver medal – second place	1999 Brisbane	Team Competition
Bronze medal – third place	1997 Berlin	Team Competition
Bronze medal – third place	2002 Macau	Team Competition
European Championship
Gold medal – first place	1999 Cologne	Team Competition

Fleur Nicolette Andrea van de Kieft (born 22 October 1973 in Amsterdam) is a former field hockey striker from the Netherlands, who played 137 official international matches for Holland, in which she scored a total number of 44 goals.

Van de Kieft was a member of the Dutch Women's Team that won the bronze medal at the 2000 Summer Olympics, after defeating Spain (2–0) in the third place match. Four years earlier, when Atlanta, Georgia hosted the Games, she won her first Olympic bronze medal.

A player from Laren and Rotterdam Van de Kieft made her debut for the Dutch on 29 January 1996 in a friendly against the United States. Her last cap came on 1 September 2002, when Holland defeated Australia: 4–3.
