= Suzan van der Wielen =

Dutch field hockey player

Personal information
- Born: 30 October 1971 (age 54)
Medal record
Women's field hockey
Representing the Netherlands
Olympic Games
| Bronze medal – third place | 1996 Atlanta | Team competition |
| Bronze medal – third place | 2000 Sydney | Team competition |
World Cup
| Silver medal – second place | 1998 Utrecht | Team Competition |
Champions Trophy
| Gold medal – first place | 2000 Amstelveen | Team Competition |
| Silver medal – second place | 1993 Amstelveen | Team competition |
| Silver medal – second place | 1999 Brisbane | Team Competition |
| Bronze medal – third place | 1991 Berlin | Team Competition |
| Bronze medal – third place | 1997 Berlin | Team Competition |
European Nations Cup
| Gold medal – first place | 1995 Amstelveen | Team Competition |
| Gold medal – first place | 1999 Cologne | Team Competition |

Suzan Jacobien Unia van der Wielen (born 30 October 1971 in Emmen, Drenthe) is a former field hockey player from the Netherlands, who played 191 international matches for the Netherlands, in which the striker scored a total number of seventy goals.
