= Carole Thate =

Dutch field hockey player (born 1971)

Medal record

Women's field hockey

Representing the Netherlands

Olympic Games
Bronze medal – third place	1996 Atlanta	Team competition
Bronze medal – third place	2000 Sydney	Team competition

World Cup
Gold medal – first place	1990 Sydney	Team Competition
Silver medal – second place	1998 Utrecht	Team Competition

Champions Trophy
Gold medal – first place	2000 Amstelveen	Team Competition
Silver medal – second place	1999 Brisbane	Team Competition
Bronze medal – third place	1991 Berlin	Team Competition
Bronze medal – third place	1997 Berlin	Team Competition

European Championship
Gold medal – first place	1999 Cologne	Team Competition

Carole Helene Antoinette Thate (born 6 December 1971, in Utrecht) is a Dutch former field hockey player, who played 168 international matches for the Netherlands, in which she scored forty goals. She made her debut on 20 November 1989 in a friendly match against England.

== Biography ==
Thate was a member of the Holland squad that won the bronze medal at the 1996 Summer Olympics in Atlanta, Georgia, and once again four years later at the 2000 Summer Olympics in Sydney. She captained the team for several years, and played as a midfielder for Dutch clubs Shinty, Schaerweyde, Kampong and Amsterdam. After she quit playing hockey and became the director of the Dutch Johan Cruijff Foundation in Amsterdam. Thate is married, to one of the highest international goal scorers, the Australian striker Alyson Annan. They had their first child, Sam, in May 2007. Their second son, Cooper, was born in October 2008.

== College ==
In 1996, while at James Madison, Thate won the Honda Award (now the Honda Sports Award) as the nation's best field hockey player.

Awards
Preceded by None	Amsterdam Sportswoman of the Year; 1999	Succeeded by Lieja Tunks
