= Franziska Gude =

German field hockey player

Personal information
- Born: 19 March 1976 (age 50) Göttingen, Lower Saxony
- Height: 165 cm (5 ft 5 in)
- Weight: 62 kg (137 lb)

Sport
- Sport: Field hockey
Medal record
Women's field hockey
Representing Germany
Olympic Games
Gold medal – first place	2004 Athens	Team competition
Champions Trophy
Silver medal – second place	2000 Amstelveen	Team competition
Bronze medal – third place	1999 Brisbane	Team competition
Champions Challenge
Gold medal – first place	2003 Catania	Team competition
European Championship
Silver medal – second place	1999 Cologne	Team Competition

Franziska "Franzi" Löwe (née Gude, born 19 March 1976 in Göttingen, Lower Saxony) is a field hockey midfielder from Germany, who won the gold medal with the German National Women's Team at the 2004 Summer Olympics in Athens, Greece.

== International senior tournaments ==
- 1999 – Champions Trophy, Brisbane (3rd place)
- 1999 – European Nations Cup, Cologne (2nd place)
- 2000 – Olympic Qualifying Tournament, Milton Keynes (3rd place)
- 2000 – Champions Trophy, Amstelveen (2nd place)
- 2000 – Summer Olympics, Sydney (7th place)
- 2002 – European Indoor Nations Cup, France (1st place)
- 2002 – World Cup, Perth (7th place)
- 2003 – World Indoor Nations Cup, Leipzig (1st place)
- 2003 – Champions Challenge, Catania (1st place)
- 2003 – European Nations Cup, Barcelona (3rd place)
- 2004 – Olympic Qualifier, Auckland (4th place)
- 2004 – Summer Olympics, Athens (1st place)
