= Hanneke Smabers =

Dutch field hockey player

Personal information
- Born: 19 October 1973 (age 52)
Medal record
Women's Field Hockey
Representing the Netherlands
Olympic Games
Bronze medal – third place	2000 Sydney	Team competition
World Cup
Silver medal – second place	1998 Utrecht	Team competition
Champions Trophy
Gold medal – first place	2000 Amstelveen	Team competition
Silver medal – second place	1993 Amstelveen	Team competition
Silver medal – second place	1999 Brisbane	Team competition
European Championship
Gold medal – first place	1999 Cologne	Team Competition

Hanneke Smabers (born 19 October 1973 in The Hague, South Holland) is a former field hockey midfielder from the Netherlands, who played 126 international matches for the Dutch national team, and scored 12 goals. She made her debut on 3 July 1993 against Germany (0-2), and was a member of the team that won the bronze medal at the 2000 Summer Olympics. Her younger sister, Minke, also played international hockey for the national team.
