= Diana Weavers =

New Zealand field hockey player

Medal record

Women's Field hockey

Representing New Zealand

Commonwealth Games
Bronze medal – third place	1998 Kuala Lumpur	Team

Diana Elizabeth Weavers (born 4 May 1975 in Darfield, New Zealand) is a field hockey defender from New Zealand, who finished sixth with her national team at the 2000 Summer Olympics in Sydney. She also competed with The Black Sticks at the 1998 and the 2002 Commonwealth Games, and at the 2004 Summer Olympics in Athens.

== International senior competitions ==
- 1998 – Commonwealth Games, Kuala Lumpur
- 1998 – World Cup, Utrecht
- 1999 – Champions Trophy, Brisbane
- 2000 – Olympic Qualifying Tournament, Milton Keynes
- 2000 – Champions Trophy, Amstelveen
- 2000 – Summer Olympics, Sydney
- 2001 – Champions Trophy, Amstelveen
- 2002 – Commonwealth Games, Manchester
- 2002 – Champions Trophy, Macau
- 2002 – World Cup, Perth
- 2003 – Champions Challenge, Catania
- 2004 – Olympic Qualifying Tournament, Auckland
- 2004 – Summer Olympics, Athens
- 2004 – Champions Trophy, Rosario
- 2006 – Commonwealth Games, Melbourne
- 2006 – World Cup Qualifier, Rome
- 2006 – Champions Trophy, Amstelveen
