= Daphne Touw =

Dutch field hockey player

Personal information
- Born: 13 January 1970 (age 56) Teteringen, North Brabant
Medal record
Women's field hockey
Representing the Netherlands
Olympic Games
Bronze medal – third place	2000 Sydney	Team competition
World Cup
Silver medal – second place	1998 Utrecht	Team competition
Champions Trophy
Silver medal – second place	1993 Amstelveen	Team competition
Silver medal – second place	1999 Brisbane	Team competition
Bronze medal – third place	1997 Berlin	Team competition

Daphne Touw (born 13 January 1970 in Teteringen, North Brabant) is a former field hockey goalkeeper from the Netherlands, who played 68 international matches for the Dutch National Women's Team. She made her debut on 3 July 1993 against Germany, and was a member of the team that won the bronze medal at the 2000 Summer Olympics in Sydney, Australia.
