= Alison Peek =

Australian field hockey player

Alison Peek OAM
Personal information
- Nationality: Australian
- Born: 12 October 1969 (age 56) Australia
Medal record
Women's field hockey
Representing Australia
Olympic Games
Gold medal – first place	2000 Sydney	Team
World Cup
Silver medal – second place	1990 Sydney	Team
Gold medal – first place	1994 Dublin	Team
Gold medal – first place	1998 Utrecht	Team
Commonwealth Games
Gold medal – first place	1998 Kuala Lumpur	Team
Champions Trophy
Silver medal – second place	1989 Frankfurt	Team
Gold medal – first place	1991 Berlin	Team
Gold medal – first place	1993 Amstelveen	Team
Gold medal – first place	1995 Mar del Plata	Team
Gold medal – first place	1999 Brisbane	Team
Bronze medal – third place	2000 Amstelveen	Team

Alison Louise Peek OAM (born 12 October 1969), nicknamed "Peeky", is a former field hockey player from Australia, who competed in two Summer Olympics for her native country. She was a member of the Australia women's national field hockey team, best known as the Hockeyroos, that won a gold medal at the 2000 Summer Olympics. As well as being an Olympic gold medallist, she won a Commonwealth Games gold medal, two World Cup gold medals, four Champions Trophy gold medals and was named in the Australian Women's ‘Team of the Century’.

The perpetual shield for Hockey SA's U18 Women's State Junior Zone Championship is named after Peek.

== Personal ==
Peek lives in country South Australia.

== Field hockey ==
=== Club hockey ===
Peek played club hockey for Adelaide Hockey Club in South Australia.

=== State hockey ===
In 1995, Peek was in the Australian Hockey League team the Southern Suns that won the national championship.

She is on the South Australian Sports Institute Olympic Games Honour Roll.

=== International hockey ===
Peek is a dual Olympian who first played for Australia in 1989 and retired after 2000 having played 222 international games and scored 6 goals.

She made her Olympic Games debut in 1992 in Barcelona where the team finished fifth, but missed out on the 1996 Olympic Games where the Hockeyroos won the gold medal.

Peek returned to the Olympic stage in 2000 in Sydney and played strongly winning a gold medal as the Hockeyroos enjoyed a fine tournament. From its eight matches, the Hockeyroos won seven and drew one, outscoring its opponents 25–5. Australia beat Argentina 3–1 in the final to become the first women's hockey team to successfully defend an Olympic title.

At 222 matches, Peek has played more international hockey matches for Australia than any other South Australian. She is one of only three South Australians, and one of only 16 females to have played over 200 international games for Australia.

Her achievements include:

- 1990 - World Cup - Sydney - Silver
- Playing in four winning Champions Trophy Tournaments in 1991, 1993, 1995 and 1999 as well as a silver in 1989 and bronze in 2000
- Competing in her first Olympic Games in Barcelona in 1992 and finishing 5th
- 1994 - World Cup - Ireland - gold
- 1998 - World Cup - Holland - gold
- 1998 - Commonwealth Games - Kuala Lumpur - gold
- 2000 - Olympic Games - Sydney - gold

== Volunteering ==
Peek is actively involved in the community serving in a number of ways. She was the Hockey Ambassador for the 2015 Australian Masters Games in Adelaide and is involved in coaching junior hockey.

== Recognition ==
As part of the Australia Day honours in January 2001, Peek was given the Medal of the Order of Australia (OAM) for service to sport as a gold medallist at the Sydney 2000 Olympic Games.

As a member of the 2000 Sydney Olympic Games gold medal-winning Hockeyroos, Peek was named in the Australian Women's ‘Team of the Century’ at the 2013 ‘Centenary of Canberra Sportswomen’s Ball’ conducted at The Great Hall, Parliament House in Canberra.
