= Cibeles Romero =

Spanish field hockey player (born 1978)

Cibeles Romero Misioner (Note: In this Spanish name, the first or paternal surname is Romero and the second or maternal family name is Misioner.) (born 22 June 1978 in Madrid) is a former female field hockey player from Spain, who was a member of the Women's National Team at the 2000 Summer Olympics in Sydney, Australia. There the team ended up in fourth place under the guidance of Dutch coach Marc Lammers. She played club hockey for SPV 51 in Madrid.
