= Ageeth Boomgaardt =

Dutch field hockey player

Personal information
- Born: 15 November 1972 (age 53) Tilburg, Netherlands
Medal record
Women's field hockey
Representing the Netherlands
Olympic Games
Silver medal – second place	2004 Athens	Team competition
Bronze medal – third place	2000 Sydney	Team competition
World Cup
Silver medal – second place	1998 Utrecht	Team Competition
Silver medal – second place	2002 Perth	Team Competition
Champions Trophy
Gold medal – first place	2000 Amstelveen	Team Competition
Silver medal – second place	1999 Brisbane	Team Competition
Silver medal – second place	2001 Amstelveen	Team Competition
Bronze medal – third place	1997 Berlin	Team Competition
Bronze medal – third place	2002 Macau	Team Competition
Bronze medal – third place	2003 Sydney	Team Competition
European Championship
Gold medal – first place	1999 Cologne	Team Competition

Ageeth Boomgaardt (born 15 November 1972) is a Dutch former field hockey defender, who played 192 international matches for the Netherlands, in which she scored 86 goals. She made her debut on 27 January 1996, in a friendly match against the United States.
