= Chris Spice =

Chris Spice OBE (born 25 December 1959) is a British-Australian sports executive, currently Performance Director for Aquatics GB (formerly British Swimming), and a former field hockey player and coach for Australia.

== Early life ==
He was born in Brisbane, the youngest of six children. People in his family played top-tier sport in hockey and softball.

He played field hockey for Queensland, Western Australia and Australia.

== Career ==
=== Field hockey ===
In the early 1990s he became a coach for the Australian women's field hockey team, working under Ric Charlesworth. The team won the World Cup in 1994 for the first time and the Olympic gold medal in 1996.

After the Olympics he became Performance Director for the English Hockey Association (England Hockey) in 1997, and joined the Great Britain team in 1998, taking the teams to the Olympics in 2000, where the men finished sixth and the women finished eighth.

=== Rugby ===
In February 2001 Spice was appointed Performance Director for the Rugby Football Union (RFU) and Director for England Rugby Limited (the professional game board responsible for overseeing the England teams and Premier Rugby). In this role he was responsible for £50m over seven years to design a world class performance plan to identify and develop future England players, oversee the England teams (England, England A, Under 21, under 18, under 16 talent) and create regional academies which were set up in conjunction with the Premiership clubs. He also was responsible for creating a world-leading sport science and medicine department which covered fitness, nutrition, sports medicine, psychology and elite coach education. In late 2001, he appointed former Welsh rugby head coach, Kevin Bowring as Head of Elite Coach Development to develop the next crop of England coaches and academy managers.

During his RFU tenure, England won the men's Rugby World Cup in 2003, the Six Nations Championship in 2003, three consecutive Hong Kong Rugby 7s titles 2002-2004, a Commonwealth Games silver medal in 2006 (Melbourne), and the Churchill Cup in 2003 and 2005.

=== Basketball ===
In 2007 he became Performance Director for British Basketball, being responsible for the team at the 2012 Summer Olympics.

=== Swimming ===
He became the Performance Director for British Swimming, taking the team to the Olympics in 2016 and 2021.

Spice was appointed Officer of the Order of the British Empire (OBE) in the 2022 New Year Honours for services to swimming and high performance sport.

== See also ==
- Bill Furniss, head coach of British Swimming
- Hockey Queensland
- Simon Timson, former Performance Director of UK Sport
