= Jeong Hang-ju =

South Korean hockey player

Personal information
- Nationality: South Korean
- Born: 21 September 1979 (age 46)

Sport
- Sport: Field hockey

Jeong Hang-ju (born 21 September 1979) is a South Korean field hockey player. She competed in the women's tournament at the 2000 Summer Olympics.
