= Rika Ishida =

Japanese field hockey player

Rika Ishida (born 18 June 1981) is a Japanese former field hockey player who competed in the 2004 Summer Olympics.
