= Dillianne van den Boogaard =

Dutch field hockey player

Personal information
- Born: 9 August 1974 (age 51)
Medal record
Women's field hockey
Representing the Netherlands
Olympic Games
Bronze medal – third place	1996 Atlanta	Team competition
Bronze medal – third place	2000 Sydney	Team competition
World Cup
Silver medal – second place	1998 Utrecht	Team competition
Champions Trophy
Gold medal – first place	2000 Amstelveen	Team competition
Silver medal – second place	1999 Brisbane	Team competition
Silver medal – second place	2001 Amstelveen	Team competition
Bronze medal – third place	1997 Berlin	Team competition
Euro Nations Cup
Gold medal – first place	1995 Amstelveen	Team competition
Gold medal – first place	1999 Cologne	Team competition

Dillianne van den Boogaard (born 9 August 1974) was a Dutch field hockey defender, who played 174 international matches, representing the Netherlands, in which she has scored 68 goals. She was born in Veghel, the Netherlands.
