= Fiona Greenham =

British field hockey player

Personal information
- Nationality: English
- Born: 19 May 1976 (age 50) Portsmouth, Hampshire

Sport
- Sport: Field Hockey
Medal record
field hockey
Representing England
Commonwealth Games
Silver medal – second place	1998 Kuala Lumpur	Team

Fiona Margaret Greenham (born 19 May 1976) is a British former field hockey player who competed in the 2000 Summer Olympics. She was born in Portsmouth, England. She represented England and won a silver medal, at the 1998 Commonwealth Games in Kuala Lumpur.
