= Alyson Annan =

Australian field hockey player

Alyson Annan OAM
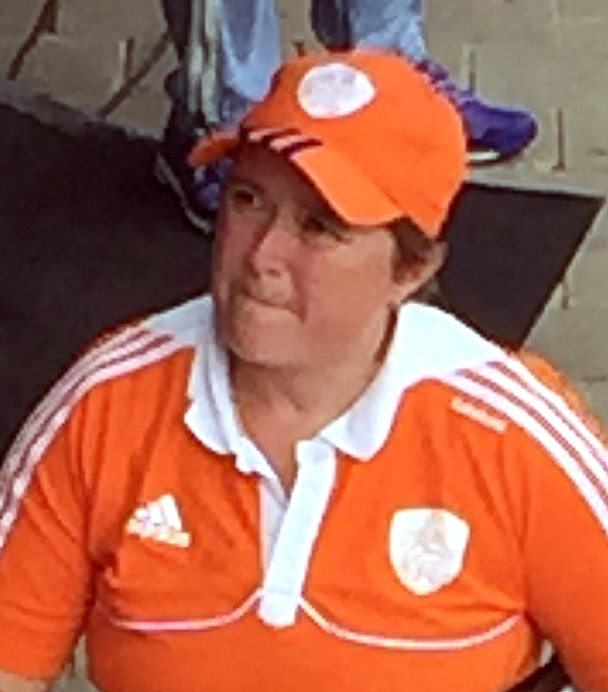
- Annan in 2016

Personal information
- Full name: Alyson Regina Annan
- Born: 21 June 1973 (age 53) Wentworthville, New South Wales, Australia
- Height: 162 cm (5 ft 4 in)
- Weight: 65 kg (143 lb)

Sport
- Sport: Field hockey
National team
Years	Team	Caps	Goals
1991–2001	Australia	228	(166)
Coaching career
- Years: Team
- 2015–2021: Netherlands
- 2022–: China
Medal record
World Hockey Cup
Gold medal – first place	1994 Dublin
Gold medal – first place	1998 Utrecht
Champions Trophy
Gold medal – first place	1993 Amstelveen
Gold medal – first place	1995 Mar del Plata
Gold medal – first place	1997 Berlin
Gold medal – first place	1999 Brisbane
Bronze medal – third place	2000 Amstelveen
Bronze medal – third place	2001 Amstelveen
Junior World Cup
Silver medal – second place	1993 Barcelona
Olympic Games
Gold medal – first place	1996 Atlanta	Team
Gold medal – first place	2000 Sydney	Team
Commonwealth Games
Gold medal – first place	1998 Kuala Lumpur	Team

Alyson Regina Annan OAM (born 21 June 1973) is an Australian field hockey coach and retired field hockey player, who earned a total number of 228 international caps for the Women's national team, in which she scored 166 goals. Since 2022, she is also the current head coach of the China women's national field hockey team.

From 2015, Annan was the head coach of the Netherlands women's national field hockey team; she led the team to a silver medal at the 2016 Summer Olympics in Brazil and a gold medal at the 2020 Summer Olympics in Tokyo as well as gold medals at the 2017 and the 2021 Women's EuroHockey Nations Championship in The Netherlands. In 2022, she was sacked for creating a culture of fear, although several experienced players in the team reported that they had not been consulted .

During 2013 Annan gained the prestigious award of becoming a member of Sport Australia Hall of Fame. She is currently head coach of the China Women's National team.

== Biography ==
Annan was born on 12 June 1973 in Wentworthville, New South Wales. She was voted the Best Female Hockey Player in the World in 1999. In the following year, she led the Australian team to gold at the 2000 Summer Olympics. She subsequently retired from international competition and moved to the Netherlands. In the Netherlands she played for HC Klein Zwitserland from The Hague. She retired in 2003, becoming the coach of Dutch league team HC Klein Zwitserland. In 2004, she was an assistant of Dutch Head Coach Marc Lammers at the 2004 Summer Olympics in Athens, Greece, when the Netherlands won silver.

Annan was married to Argentinian hockey player, Maximiliano Caldas. After their divorce her partner became Carole Thate, a former Dutch hockey captain and fellow Olympic medallist. Annan and Thate had their first child, Sam Henk Brian Thate, in May 2007. Their second son, Cooper Thate, was born in October 2008.

Annan was to be the coach of the first women's team of the Amsterdamsche Hockey & Bandy Club during the 2012–2013 season.

In 2013 Annan was inducted into the Sport Australia Hall of Fame.

In October 2015 she was named as head coach of the Netherlands women's team, succeeding Sjoerd Marijne. Annan's former husband Max Caldas previously coached the Netherlands women's team to a gold medal at the 2012 Olympic Games. During the 2016 games in Rio de Janeiro Annan coached her team to a silver medal losing to the Great Britain Team after shoot-outs in the final.

In 2022, Annan was fired as coach of the Netherlands women's team after an investigation into accusations of verbal intimidation and creating a culture of fear and silence. However, according to one Dutch hockey commentator, there was an internal divide within the team about how to achieve the team's objectives: "There were two currents within the Dutch team and the question was which one would come out on top" (English translation of the Dutch original). Several experienced players reported the decision had been made without consulting them, using hockey.nl to express their support for Annan and describing her as a "fantastic coach" (English translation of the Dutch original). Annan chose not to comment publicly, beyond releasing a statement that "In recent months I have gained insight into the points that we as a team, staff and individuals could work on. In my opinion, there is no difference of opinion about what can be improved, but there is about the approach to it. I have drawn a line for myself there and this is unfortunately the consequence" (English translation of the Dutch original) .

== Major international tournaments ==
- 2000 Olympic Games Gold Medal
- 1996 Olympic Games Gold Medal
- 1992 Olympic Games 5th
- 1998 Hockey World Cup Gold Medal
- 1994 Hockey World Cup Gold Medal
- 2001 Champions Trophy 3rd
- 2000 Champions Trophy 3rd
- 1999 Champions Trophy Gold Medal
- 1997 Champions Trophy Gold Medal
- 1995 Champions Trophy Gold Medal
- 1993 Champions Trophy Gold Medal
- 1998 Commonwealth Games Gold Medal
- 1993 Junior Hockey World Cup Silver Medal

== Awards ==
- 1994 Team of the Year Australian Sports Awards
- 1995 Team of the Year Australian Sports Awards
- 1996 Team of the Year Australian Sports Awards
- 1996 Player of the Year Australian Women's Hockey Association
- 1996 Player of the Series Australian Hockey League
- 1996 New South Wales Sportswoman of the Year
- 1996 New South Wales Athlete of the Year
- 1996 Order of Australia Medal
- 1997 Team of the Year Australian Sports Awards
- 1997 Player of the Year Australian Women's Hockey Association
- 1997 Player of the Tournament Champions Trophy
- 1998 Team of the Year Australian Sports Awards
- 1998 International Player of the Year International Hockey Federation
- 1998 Player of the Tournament Hockey World Cup
- 1998 Finalist World Sportswoman of the Year Women's Sport Foundation (USA)
- 2000 International Player of the Year International Hockey Federation
- 2002 Player of the Year Dutch League
- 2003 Player of the Year Dutch League
- 2013 Sport Australia Hall of Fame inductee
