= Jenny Duck =

New Zealand field hockey player

Personal information
- Born: 31 July 1968 (age 57)
Medal record
Women's field hockey
Representing New Zealand
Commonwealth Games
Bronze medal – third place	1998 Kuala Lumpur	Team

Jennifer Susan Duck (born 31 July 1968 in Wellington, New Zealand) is a former field hockey player from New Zealand, who finished in sixth position with the women's national team, nicknamed Black Sticks, at the 2000 Summer Olympics in Sydney, Australia. Two years earlier she was a member of the side that captured the bronze medal at the 1998 Commonwealth Games in Kuala Lumpur, Malaysia.
