= Nuria Moreno =

Spanish field hockey player (born 1975)

Personal information
- Born: 7 June 1975 (age 51)
Medal record
Women's field hockey
Representing Spain
European Nations Cup
Silver medal – second place	1995 Amstelveen	Team competition

Nuria Moreno de Pedrón (born 7 June 1975 in Madrid) is a retired female field hockey player from Spain. She was a member of the women's national team at the 2000 Summer Olympics. There the team ended up in fourth place. She played club hockey for SPV 51 in Madrid, and is married to long-distance runner José Manuel Martínez.
