= María del Carmen Martín =

Spanish field hockey player (born 1976)

Personal information
- Nationality: Spanish
- Born: September 1, 1976

Sport
- Country: Spain
- Sport: Field hockey
- Event: Women's field hockey

Achievements and titles
- Olympic finals: 2000 Summer Olympics; 2004 Summer Olympics

María del Carmen Martín (born 1 September 1976) is a Spanish field hockey player who competed in the 2000 Summer Olympics and in the 2004 Summer Olympics.
