= Paola Vidulich =

South African field hockey player (born 1977)

Paola Vidulich (born 20 April 1977) is a South African former field hockey player who competed in the 2000 Summer Olympics.
