= Kim Mi-hyeon =

South Korean hockey player

Personal information
- Nationality: South Korean
- Born: 3 February 1977 (age 49)

Sport
- Sport: Field hockey
Medal record
Women's field hockey
Representing South Korea
Asian Games
Gold medal – first place	1998 Bangkok	Team

Kim Mi-hyeon (born 3 February 1977) is a South Korean former field hockey player. She competed in the women's tournament at the 2000 Summer Olympics.
