= Inke van Wyk =

South African field hockey player

Inke van Wyk (born 17 February 1971) is a South African former field hockey player who competed in the 2000 Summer Olympics.
