= Jacqui Benkenstein =

South African field hockey player

Jacqui Benkenstein (née Geyser, born 4 August 1974) is a South African former field hockey player who competed in the 2000 Summer Olympics.
