= Karen Symons =

South African field hockey player

Karen Symons (born 19 February 1967) is a South African former field hockey player who competed in the 2000 Summer Olympics.
