= Rachel Sutherland =

New Zealand field hockey player

Rachel Anne Sutherland (born 3 August 1976 in Nelson, New Zealand) is a field hockey player from New Zealand, who represented her native country at the 2004 Summer Olympics in Athens, Greece. There she finished in sixth place with the Women's National Team, wearing the number five jersey. Sutherland was affiliated with Emeralds, Manawatu.
