= Nadine Ernsting-Krienke =

German field hockey player (born 1974)

Personal information
- Born: 5 February 1974 (age 52) Telgte, West Germany
- Height: 172 cm (5 ft 8 in)
- Weight: 67 kg (148 lb)

Sport
- Sport: Field hockey
- Position: Striker
Senior career
| Years | Team | Caps | Goals |
| 1989–2015 | Eintracht Braunschweig | - | - |
National team
| Years | Team | Caps | Goals |
| 1990–2007 | Germany | 360 | (137) |
Medal record
Women's field hockey
Representing Germany
Olympic Games
| Gold medal – first place | 2004 Athens | Team competition |
| Silver medal – second place | 1992 Barcelona | Team competition |
World Cup
| Bronze medal – third place | 1998 Utrecht | Team competition |
Champions Trophy
| Gold medal – first place | 2006 Amstelveen | Team competition |
| Silver medal – second place | 1991 Berlin | Team competition |
| Silver medal – second place | 1997 Berlin | Team competition |
| Silver medal – second place | 2000 Amstelveen | Team competition |
| Silver medal – second place | 2004 Rosario | Team competition |
| Bronze medal – third place | 1993 Amstelveen | Team competition |
| Bronze medal – third place | 1999 Brisbane | Team competition |
| Bronze medal – third place | 2007 Quilmes | Team competition |
Champions Challenge
| Gold medal – first place | 2003 Catania | Team competition |
European Championship
| Silver medal – second place | 1991 Brussels | Team competition |
| Silver medal – second place | 1999 Cologne | Team competition |
| Bronze medal – third place | 1995 Amstelveen | Team competition |
| Bronze medal – third place | 2003 Barcelona | Team competition |

Nadine Ernsting-Krienke (born 5 February 1974 in Telgte, North Rhine-Westphalia) is a former field hockey striker from Germany, who won the gold medal with the women's national team at the 2004 Summer Olympics in Athens, Greece. She is one of the most decorated field hockey players in Germany, having played in four consecutive Summer Olympic Games, starting in 1992. She retired from international play in 2009, after having represented Germany 360 times, scoring 137 goals.

Since 1989 she has been playing for Eintracht Braunschweig in Bundesliga.

== International senior tournaments ==
- 1990 – World Cup, Sydney (8th place)
- 1991 – Champions Trophy, Berlin (2nd place)
- 1991 – European Championship, Brussels (2nd place)
- 1992 – Summer Olympics, Barcelona (2nd place)
- 1993 – Champions Trophy, Amstelveen (3rd place)
- 1994 – World Cup, Dublin (4th place)
- 1995 – European Championship, Amstelveen (3rd place)
- 1995 – Champions Trophy, Mar del Plata (4th place)
- 1995 – Olympic Qualifying Tournament, Cape Town (3rd place)
- 1996 – Summer Olympics, Atlanta (6th place)
- 1997 – Champions Trophy, Berlin (2nd place)
- 1998 – European Indoor Nations Cup, Orense (1st place)
- 1998 – World Cup, Utrecht (3rd place)
- 1999 – Champions Trophy, Brisbane (3rd place)
- 1999 – European Championship, Cologne (2nd place)
- 2000 – Olympic Qualifying Tournament, Milton Keynes (3rd place)
- 2000 – Champions Trophy, Amstelveen (2nd place)
- 2000 – Summer Olympics, Sydney (7th place)
- 2002 – European Indoor Nations Cup, France (1st place)
- 2002 – World Cup, Perth (7th place)
- 2003 – World Indoor Nations Cup, Leipzig (1st place)
- 2003 – Champions Challenge, Catania (1st place)
- 2003 – European Championship, Barcelona (3rd place)
- 2004 – Olympic Qualifier, Auckland (4th place)
- 2004 – Summer Olympics, Athens (1st place)
- 2004 – Champions Trophy, Rosario (2nd place)
- 2005 – Champions Trophy, Canberra (5th place)
- 2006 – Champions Trophy, Amstelveen (1st place)
- 2006 – World Cup, Madrid (8th)
- 2007 – Champions Trophy, Quilmes (3rd place)
