= Shen Lihong =

Chinese hockey player

Personal information
- Nationality: Chinese
- Born: 30 October 1977 (age 48)

Sport
- Sport: Field hockey

Shen Lihong (born 30 October 1977) is a Chinese field hockey player. She competed in the women's tournament at the 2000 Summer Olympics.
