= Rechelle Hawkes =

Australian field hockey player

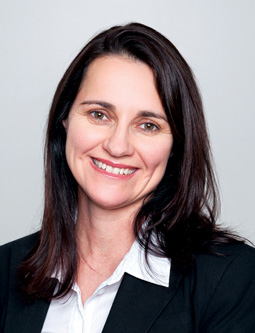

Medal record

Women's field hockey

Representing Australia

Olympic Games
Gold medal – first place	1988 Seoul	Team
Gold medal – first place	1996 Atlanta	Team
Gold medal – first place	2000 Sydney	Team

World Cup
Gold medal – first place	1994 Dublin	Team
Gold medal – first place	1998 Utrecht	Team
Silver medal – second place	1990 Sydney	Team

Commonwealth Games
Gold medal – first place	1998 Kuala Lumpur	Team

Champions Trophy
Gold medal – first place	1991 Berlin	Team
Gold medal – first place	1993 Amstelveen	Team
Gold medal – first place	1995 Mar del Plata	Team
Gold medal – first place	1997 Berlin	Team
Gold medal – first place	1999 Brisbane	Team
Silver medal – second place	1987 Amstelveen	Team
Silver medal – second place	1989 Frankfurt	Team
Bronze medal – third place	2000 Amstelveen	Team

Rechelle Margaret Hawkes AM (born 30 May 1967 in Albany, Western Australia) is an Australian former field hockey player. Hawkes spent eight years as the captain of the Australian Women's Hockey Team, the Hockeyroos, and became the second Australian woman after swimmer Dawn Fraser to win three Olympic gold medals at three separate Olympic Games: Seoul 1988, Atlanta 1996 and Sydney 2000.

Hawkes also competed at the 1992 Summer Olympics in Barcelona, where Australia finished fifth. She made her debut in 1985, and reached a milestone in 1999, when the midfield player celebrated 250 games for the national team. She read the Athlete's Olympic Oath at the Sydney 2000 Olympic Games.

She received a Medal of the Order of Australia in 1989, an Australian Sports Medal in 2000, and a Centenary Medal in 2001. In 2001, she was inducted into the Australian Institute of Sport 'Best of the Best'. She was inducted into the Sport Australia Hall of Fame in 2002.

In the 2018 Australia Day Honours, Hawkes was made a Member of the Order of Australia "For significant service to hockey, particularly as national captain of multiple tournament-winning teams, and as a role model and commentator."
