= Anli Kotze =

South African field hockey player

Medal record

Representing South Africa

All Africa Games
Gold medal – first place	2003 Abuja, Nigeria	

Anli Kotze (born 2 August 1979) is a South African former field hockey player who competed in the 2000 Summer Olympics and in the 2004 Summer Olympics.
