= Sin Mi-gyeong =

South Korean hockey player

Personal information
- Nationality: South Korean
- Born: 24 December 1976 (age 49)

Sport
- Sport: Field hockey

Sin Mi-gyeong (born 24 December 1976) is a South Korean field hockey player. She competed in the women's tournament at the 2000 Summer Olympics.
