= Kate Trolove =

New Zealand field hockey player

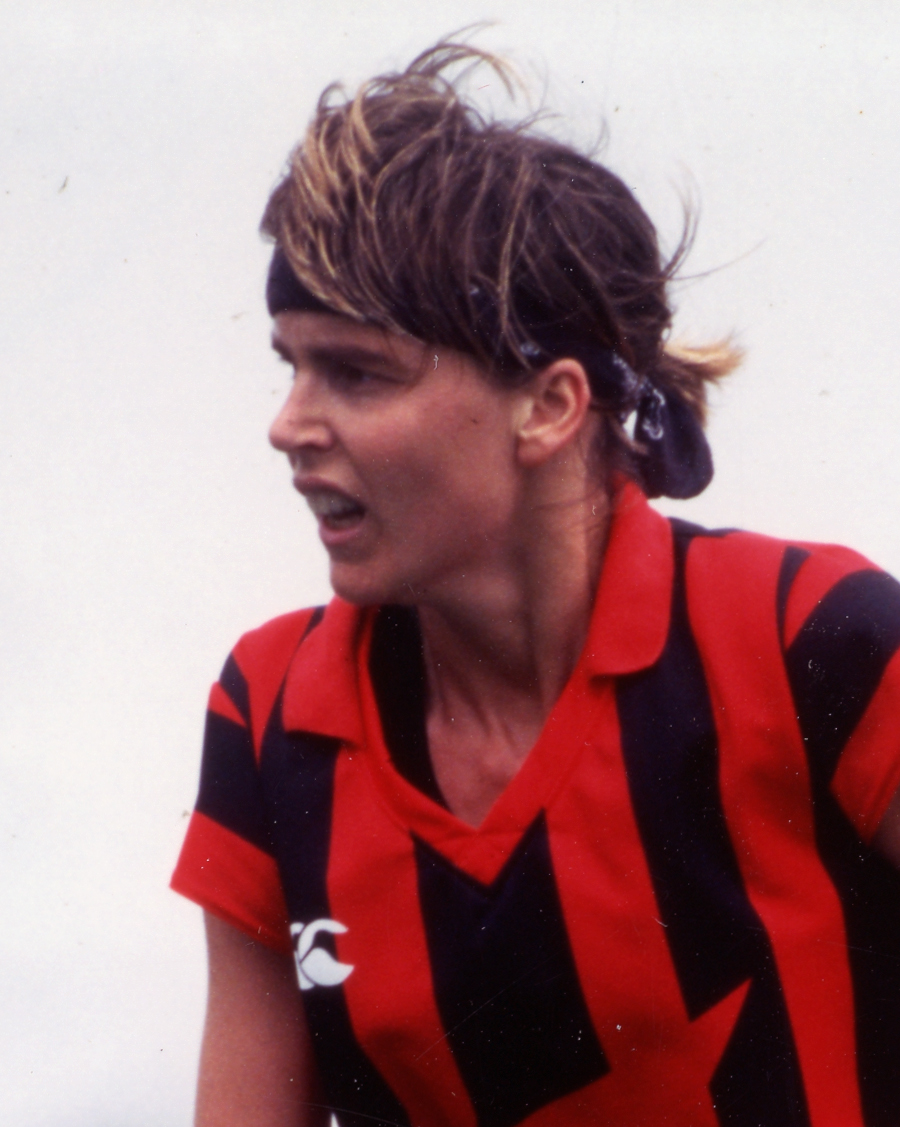

Personal information
- Full name: Katherine Jill Trolove
- Born: 4 August 1967 (age 59) Christchurch, New Zealand
Medal record
Women's field hockey
Representing New Zealand
Commonwealth Games
Bronze medal – third place	1998 Kuala Lumpur	Team

Katherine Jill Trolove (born 4 August 1967 in Christchurch, New Zealand) is a former field hockey player from New Zealand, who finished in eight position with the National Women's Field Hockey Team at the 1992 Summer Olympics in Barcelona. She was also a member of the squad that won the bronze medal at the 1998 Commonwealth Games in Kuala Lumpur. Two years later, at the 2000 Summer Olympics in Sydney, Trolove ended up sixth with The Black Sticks.
