= Badri Latif =

German field hockey player

Medal record

Representing Germany

Women's Field hockey

Olympic Games
Gold medal – first place	2004 Athens	Team

Badri Latif (Persian: بدری لطیف; born 2 July 1977) is a German field hockey player. She was born in Berlin. She won a gold medal at the 2004 Summer Olympics in Athens.
