= Rachel Petrie =

New Zealand field hockey player

Rachel Jane Petrie (born 21 April 1971 in Ashburton, New Zealand) is a former field hockey defender from New Zealand, who finished sixth with her national team at the 2000 Summer Olympics in Sydney.

She attended Burnside High School, Christchurch from 1984 to 1988.
