= Anne-Marie Irving =

New Zealand field hockey player

Anne-Marie Irving (born 16 February 1977 in Christchurch) is a former field hockey goalkeeper from New Zealand, who finished sixth with her national team at the 2000 Summer Olympics in Sydney. She also competed with The Black Sticks at the 2002 Commonwealth Games in Manchester.
