= Skippy Hamahona =

New Zealand field hockey player

Personal information
- Born: Marama Cecelia McGregor; 1 January 1975 (age 51) Sydney, New South Wales, Australia
Medal record
Women's field hockey
Representing New Zealand
Commonwealth Games
Bronze medal – third place	1998 Kuala Lumpur	Team

Marama Cecelia "Skippy" Hamahona (née McGregor; born 1 January 1975) is a former field hockey player from New Zealand. She finished in sixth position with the Women's National Team, nicknamed Black Sticks, at the 2000 Summer Olympics in Sydney, Australia. Two years earlier she was a member of the side that claimed the bronze medal at the 1998 Commonwealth Games in Kuala Lumpur, Malaysia. She was born in Sydney, Australia.
