= Sergio Vigil =

Argentine former field hockey player (born 1965)

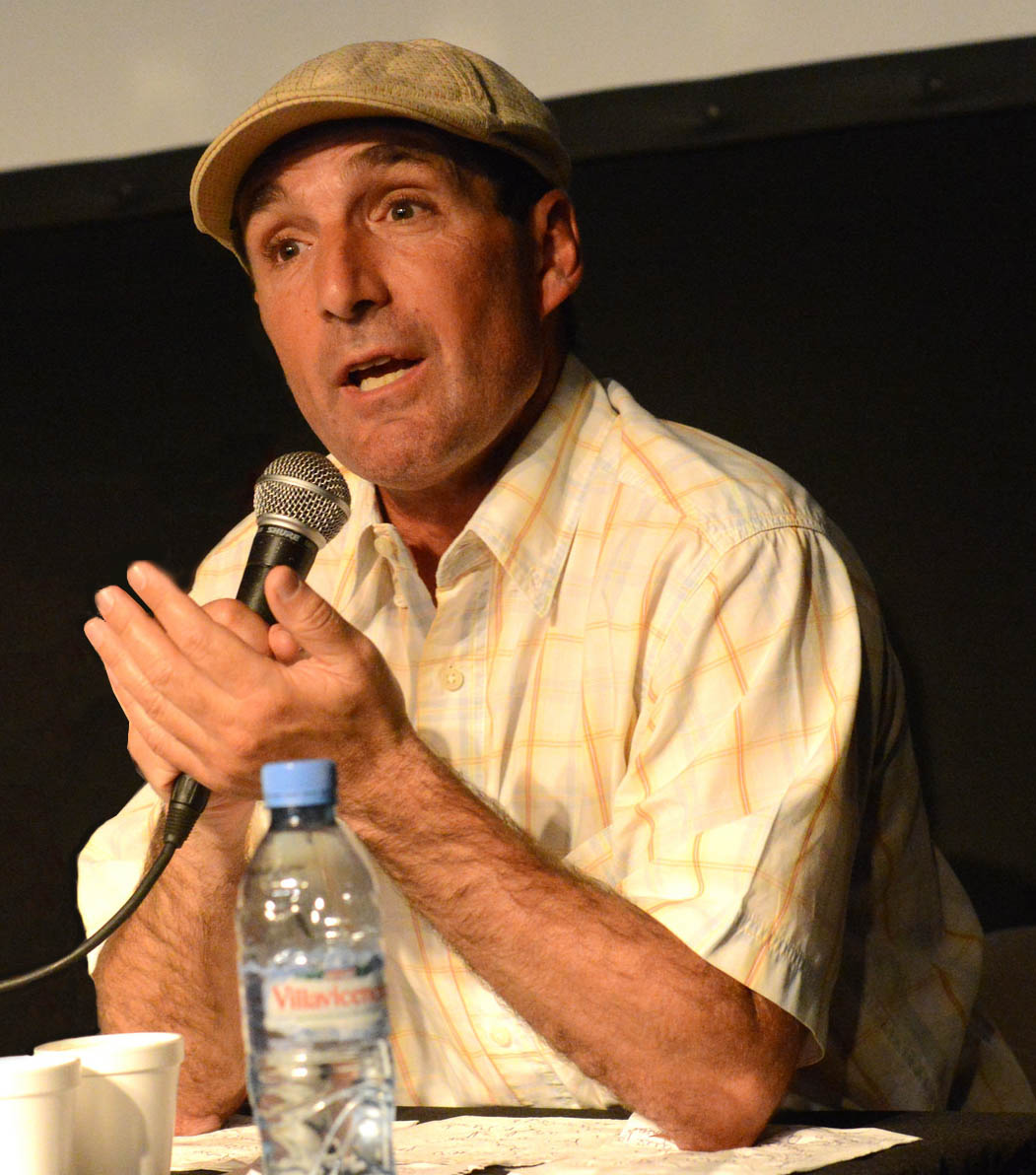
Vigil in 2014.

Sergio Vigil (born 11 August 1965 in Buenos Aires) is an Argentine former field hockey player, who later became a coach in his sport. In 1997 he was appointed as the head coach of the Argentine Women's Team, that won the silver medal at the 2000 Summer Olympics in Sydney under his guidance.

Besides that, Vigil coached Las Leonas to gold medals at the 2002 Women's Hockey World Cup, 2001 Champions Trophy, at the 1999 and 2003 Pan American Games and at the 2004 Women's Pan American Cup. Under his guidance, Las Leonas have also won the silver medal at the 2002 Champions Trophy and the bronze medal at the 2004 Summer Olympics in Athens, Greece.

Sergio has also coached Argentina men's national field hockey team from 2004 to 2008.

He won the Konex Award Merit Diploma in 2010 as one of the five best coaches of the last decade in Argentina.
