= Jan Borren =

New Zealand field hockey player

Jan Joachim Borren (born 27 September 1947 in Eindhoven) is a former field hockey player from New Zealand, who was a member of the national teams competing at the 1968 Summer Olympics in Montreal and the 1972 Summer Olympics in Munich.
