= Michelle Turner =

New Zealand hockey player

Michelle Kay Hollands (née Turner; born 1 August 1974 in Palmerston North) is a field hockey player from New Zealand. She finished in sixth position with the women's national team, nicknamed Black Sticks, at the 2000 Summer Olympics in Sydney.
