= Park Eun-kyung (field hockey) =

South Korean field hockey player

Park Eun-Kyung (Korean: 박은경, born January 25, 1975) is a South Korean field hockey player. At the 2004 and 2008 Summer Olympics she competed with the Korea women's national field hockey team in the women's tournament.
