= Sandy Bennett =

New Zealand field hockey player

Personal information
- Born: 25 May 1972 (age 54) Dargaville, New Zealand
Medal record
Women's field hockey
Representing New Zealand
Commonwealth Games
Bronze medal – third place	1998 Kuala Lumpur	Team

Sandra Kaye Bennett (born 25 May 1972 in Dargaville), more recently known as Sandy Hitchcock, is a former field hockey player who represented New Zealand at the 2000 Summer Olympics in Sydney and at the 1998 Commonwealth Games in Kuala Lumpur and the 2002 Commonwealth Games in Manchester.
