= Mandy Smith (field hockey) =

New Zealand field hockey player

Personal information
- Full name: Amanda Jane Barker
- Born: Amanda Jane Smith; 14 May 1972 (age 54) Ranfurly, New Zealand
- Spouse: Dean Barker (m. 2004)
Medal record
Women's field hockey
Representing New Zealand
Commonwealth Games
Bronze medal – third place	1998 Kuala Lumpur	Team

Amanda Jane Barker (née Smith; born 14 May 1972, in Ranfurly, New Zealand) is a former field hockey striker from New Zealand, who finished sixth with her national team at the 2000 Summer Olympics in Sydney. The forward, educated at St Hilda's College in Dunedin, played her first international game against Japan for Otago in 1989, then played for The Black Sticks the next year against Great Britain. She was unable to play in 1995 because of back problems that required major back surgery and removal of a disc from her spine. She was given only a 50–50 chance of playing again. Her back injuries were "a big part in reaching the decision" to retire six years later in November 2001.

Smith was a member of the bronze medal winning team at the 1998 Commonwealth Games in Kuala Lumpur, and was one of the athletes involved in designing the NZ Olympic Team uniform. Smith was runner-up in Women's International Hockey Player of the Year Award 2000.

After dating New Zealand rugby and television personality Marc Ellis for several years, Smith married the Olympic yachtsman and (America's Cup) skipper Dean Barker in February 2004. They have three daughters and one son.
