= Kirsty Bowden =

British field hockey player

Personal information
- Nationality: English
- Born: 21 February 1978 (age 48) Peterborough, Cambridgeshire

Sport
- Sport: Field Hockey
Medal record
field hockey
Representing England
Commonwealth Games
Silver medal – second place	1998 Kuala Lumpur	Team

Kirsty Louise Bowden (born 21 February 1978) is a female British former field hockey player who competed in the 2000 Summer Olympics. She represented England and won a silver medal, at the 1998 Commonwealth Games in Kuala Lumpur.
