= Tom van 't Hek =

Dutch field hockey player

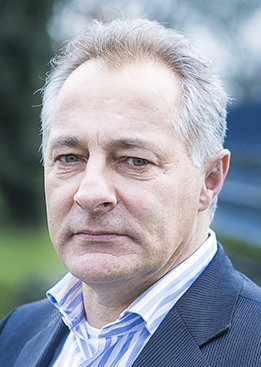

Personal information
- Born: 1 April 1958 (age 68) Naarden, Netherlands
Medal record
Men's field hockey
Representing the Netherlands
World Cup
| Gold medal – first place | 1990 Lahore | Team competition |

Maria Thomas van 't Hek (born 1 April 1958) is a Dutch former field hockey striker who played 221 international matches for the Dutch national field hockey team, in which he scored a total number of 106 goals. He made his debut on 24 September 1976 against East Germany, and competed for the Netherlands at the 1984 Summer Olympics in Los Angeles, California.

After his hockey career he became the head coach of the Dutch women's hockey team, with whom he won two bronze Olympic medals, at the 1996 Summer Olympics and at the 2000 Summer Olympics. Furthermore, the Netherlands won the European title twice (1995 and 1999) with van 't Hek in charge. He resigned after the Sydney Games and became a radio presenter of a popular sports program called Langs de Lijn.

Van 't Hek is the younger brother of Dutch comedian and publicist Youp van 't Hek.
