= Birgit Beyer =

German field hockey player

Birgit Beyer (born 13 December 1967 in Ulm) is a German former field hockey player who competed in the 1996 Summer Olympics and in the 2000 Summer Olympics.
