= Helen Clarke (field hockey) =

New Zealand field hockey player

Helen Clarke MNZM
Personal information
- Full name: Helen Margaret Clarke
- Born: Helen Margaret Shearer; 16 April 1971 (age 55) Auckland, New Zealand
- Occupation: School teacher
- Years active: 1991–2004
Medal record
Women's field hockey
Representing New Zealand
Commonwealth Games
Bronze medal – third place	1998 Kuala Lumpur	Team

Helen Margaret Clarke (née Shearer; born 16 April 1971) is a former field hockey goalkeeper and captain for New Zealand. She competed in three Summer Olympics: 1992, 2000 and 2004.

She was also a member of the New Zealand team at the 1998 Commonwealth Games in Kuala Lumpur, where she won a bronze medal, the 2002 Commonwealth Games in Manchester, and two World Cups. She retired from the sport after the 2004 Olympic Games in Athens.

Clarke earned a record 166 caps for her country. In the 2005 New Year Honours, she was appointed a Member of the New Zealand Order of Merit, for services to hockey.

She has taught physical education and English at Mount Roskill Grammar School in Auckland.
