= Kylie Foy =

New Zealand field hockey player

Kylie Anne Clegg (née Foy; born 30 December 1971, in Auckland, New Zealand) is a former field hockey striker from New Zealand, who finished sixth with her national team at the 2000 Summer Olympics in Sydney. Foy also competed with The Black Sticks at the 1992 Summer Olympics in Barcelona.

The soccer player Milly Clegg is her daughter.
