= Claire Mitchell-Taverner =

Australian field hockey player

Medal record

Representing Australia

Women's Field hockey

Olympic Games
Gold medal – first place	2000 Sydney	Team

Claire Mitchell-Taverner OAM (born 17 June 1970) is an Australian field hockey player. She was born in Melbourne. She won a gold medal at the 2000 Summer Olympics in Sydney.
