= Anna Lawrence =

New Zealand field hockey player

Personal information
- Born: 9 March 1972 (age 54) Howick, Auckland, New Zealand
Medal record
Women's field hockey
Representing New Zealand
Commonwealth Games
Bronze medal – third place	1998 Kuala Lumpur	Team

Anna Josephine Lawrence (born 9 March 1972 in Howick, Auckland) is a former field hockey midfielder from New Zealand, who finished sixth with her national team at the 2000 Summer Olympics in Sydney.

Lawrence was educated at Diocesan School for Girls in Auckland and moved to Christchurch in 1990. She played inside left or right, and competed for Amsterdam in the Dutch League since 1997. She was Canterbury Winter Sportsperson of the Year in 1998 and has played for The Black Sticks since 1990, and captained the team from 1996 to 2000. She won a bronze medal at the 1998 Commonwealth Games in Kuala Lumpur.

Lawrence retired from competitive hockey following the 2000 Olympic Games in Sydney.

Her business career post hockey included various commercial and marketing roles. These included positions as National Sponsorship Manager for Lion NZ and the National Sponsorship & Communications Director for Lion Australia.
