= Inga Möller =

German field hockey player

Inga Möller (born 27 April 1973) is a German former field hockey player who competed in the 2000 Summer Olympics.
