= Friederike Barth =

German field hockey player (born 1975)

Friederike Barth (born 27 April 1975) is a German former field hockey player who competed in the 2000 Summer Olympics.
