= 1999 Women's EuroHockey Nations Championship =

International field hockey competition

Tournament details
- Host country: Germany
- City: Cologne
- Dates: 18 – 29 August 1999
- Teams: 12

Final positions
- Champions: Netherlands (4th title)
- Runner-up: Germany
- Third place: England

Tournament statistics
- Matches played: 42
- Goals scored: 210 (5 per match)
- Top scorer: (Netherlands) Dillianne van den Boogaard (11 goals)

The 1999 Women's EuroHockey Nations Championship was the fifth edition of the women's field hockey championship organised by the European Hockey Federation. It was held in Cologne, Germany from August 18 to August 29, 1999. In the final the defending champion Netherlands defeated Germany to clinch its fourth title, and qualified for the 2000 Summer Olympics in Sydney, Australia.

== Venue ==
- KTHC Stadion Rot-Weiss

== Umpires ==
- (South Africa) Jean Buchanan
- (England) Jane Nockolds
- (Ireland) Mary Power
- (England) Dawn Henning
- (Scotland) Lynne Fotheringham
- (Germany) Heike Malina
- (Netherlands) Renée Cohen
- (Germany) Ute Conen
- (Scotland) Jean Duncan
- (Zimbabwe) Alyson Dale
- (Belgium) Isabel Kluyskens
- (Italy) Gina Spitaleri

== Preliminary round ==
=== Group A ===
Pos	Team	Pld	W	D	L	GF	GA	GD	Pts	Qualification
1	Netherlands	5	5	0	0	41	0	+41	15	Advance to the semi-finals
2	Russia	5	3	1	1	21	15	+6	10	Advance to the semi-finals
3	Scotland	5	2	1	2	9	9	0	7	5th–8th place classification
4	Lithuania	5	2	0	3	10	17	−7	6	5th–8th place classification
5	France	5	1	1	3	4	19	−15	4	9th–12th place classification
6	Belgium	5	0	1	4	3	28	−25	1	9th–12th place classification

Source: EHF

18 August 1999
18:30

Scotland	1–1	Russia
	Report

19 August 1999
10:15

Lithuania	3–1	France
	Report

19 August 1999
12:45

Netherlands	15–0	Belgium
	Report

20 August 1999
10:15

Scotland	0–1	France
	Report	Martin 6'

20 August 1999
12:45

Belgium	1–7	Russia
	Report

20 August 1999
18:15

Netherlands	7–0	Lithuania
	Report

22 August 1999
12:45

Belgium	1–3	Scotland
34'	Report	Fraser 20'; Simpson

22 August 1999
15:15

France	0–6	Netherlands
	Report

22 August 1999
18:15

Russia	4–3	Lithuania
	Report

23 August 1999
18:15

France	1–1	Belgium
	Report

24 August 1999
10:15

Scotland	5–2	Lithuania
	Report

24 August 1999
12:45

Russia	0–9	Netherlands
	Report

25 August 1999
10:15

Lithuania	2–0	Belgium
	Report

25 August 1999
12:45

Russia	9–1	France
	Report

25 August 1999
18:15

Netherlands	4–0	Scotland
	Report

=== Group B ===
Pos	Team	Pld	W	D	L	GF	GA	GD	Pts	Qualification
1	Germany (H)	5	5	0	0	20	2	+18	15	Advance to the semi-finals
2	England	5	3	1	1	25	4	+21	10	Advance to the semi-finals
3	Spain	5	3	1	1	8	7	+1	10	5th–8th place classification
4	Ukraine	5	2	0	3	8	18	−10	6	5th–8th place classification
5	Ireland	5	1	0	4	7	12	−5	3	9th–12th place classification
6	Czech Republic	5	0	0	5	1	26	−25	0	9th–12th place classification

Source: EHF
(H) Hosts

18 August 1999
10:15

England	1–1	Spain
Wright 39'	Report	López 8'

Umpires:
Jean Buchanan (RSA)
Alexandra Royaards (NED)

18 August 1999
12:45

Ireland	2–3	Ukraine
Logue 20'; Kelleher 26'	Report	Kobzenko 9', 40', 63'

18 August 1999
18:30

Germany	7–0	Czech Republic
	Report

19 August 1999
15:15

England	5–0	Ireland
	Report

19 August 1999
18:15

Spain	4–0	Czech Republic
	Report

20 August 1999
15:15

Ukraine	1–4	Germany
	Report

21 August 1999
12:45

Czech Republic	0–8	England
	Report	Cullen 16', 45'; Sixsmith 23', 28'; Wright 31', 41'; Bowden 35'; Richardson 63'

21 August 1999
15:15

Germany	2–0	Ireland
	Report

21 August 1999
18:15

Ukraine	0–1	Spain
	Report

23 August 1999
10:15

Ireland	4–0	Czech Republic
Logue 11'; McVicker 26', 28'; Thompson 49'	Report

23 August 1999
12:45

England	10–1	Ukraine
Bennett; Cullen; Nicholson; Sixsmith; Smith; Wright	Report	30'

Umpires:
Jean Buchanan (RSA)
Ann van Dyk (CAN)

23 August 1999
15:15

Spain	0–5	Germany
	Report	Keller 4', 12'; Becker 17', 44'; Rinne 52'

24 August 1999
15:15

Czech Republic	1–3	Ukraine
	Report

24 August 1999
18:15

Spain	2–1	Ireland
Muñoz 39'; Barrio 58'	Report	Kelleher 6'

25 August 1999
15:15

Germany	2–1	England
Rinne 56'; Ernsting-Krienke 67'	Report	Sixsmith 3'

== Classification round ==
=== Ninth to twelfth place ===
Crossover
28 August
France	1
Czech Republic	0
28 August
Ireland	4
Belgium	0

Ninth place
29 August
France	3
Ireland (a.e.t)	4
Eleventh place
29 August
Czech Republic	0
Belgium	2

==== Crossover ====
28 August 1999
10:15

France	1–0	Czech Republic
	Report

28 August 1999
12:45

Ireland	4–0	Belgium
	Report

==== Eleventh and twelfth place ====
29 August 1999
10:00

Czech Republic	0–2	Belgium
	Report

==== Ninth and tenth place ====
29 August 1999
10:00

France	3–4 (a.e.t.)	Ireland
	Report

=== Fifth to eighth place ===
Crossover
27 August
Scotland	3
Ukraine	2
27 August
Spain	2
Lithuania	1

Fifth place
28 August
Scotland	1 (4)
Spain (pen.)	1 (5)
Seventh place
28 August
Ukraine (a.e.t)	2
Lithuania	1

==== Crossover ====
27 August 1999
10:15

Scotland	3–2	Ukraine
Simpson 23', 34'; Gilmour 25'	Report	Djemilova 13'; Kobzenko 64'

Umpires:
Jane Nockolds (ENG)
Alexandra Royaards (NED)

27 August 1999
12:45

Spain	2–1	Lithuania
	Report

==== Seventh and eighth place ====
28 August 1999
15:15

Ukraine	2–1 (a.e.t.)	Lithuania
	Report

==== Fifth and sixth place ====
28 August 1999
18:15

Scotland	1–1 (a.e.t.)	Spain
	Report
Penalties
	4–5

== Medal round ==
Semi-finals
27 August
Netherlands (a.e.t)	2
England	1
27 August
Germany (pen.)	1 (4)
Russia	1 (1)

Final
29 August
Netherlands	2
Germany	1
Third place
29 August
England	5
Russia	0

=== Semi-finals ===
27 August 1999
15:15

Germany	1–1	Russia
	Report
Penalties
	4–1

27 August 1999
18:15

Netherlands	2–1 (a.e.t.)	England
Boomgaardt 6'; Van den Boogard 82'	Report	Cullen 66'

=== Third and fourth place ===
29 August 1999
12:30

England	5–0	Russia
Smith 6'; Sixsmith 13', 32'; Cullen 53'; Clewlow 68'	Report

Umpires:
Mary Power (IRE)
Alexandra Royaards (NED)

=== Final ===
29 August 1999
15:15

Netherlands	2–1	Germany
Van den Boogard 27'; Donners 56'	Report	Becker 19'

== Awards ==
1999 EuroHockey Nations Championship winners

Netherlands
Fourth title
