= Hockey at the 2002 Commonwealth Games – Women's team squads =

This article lists the squads of the women's hockey competition at the 2002 Commonwealth Games held at the Belle Vue Hockey in Manchester, England, from 27 July to 4 August 2002.

== Australia ==
Head coach:

- Joanne Banning
- Carmel Bakurski
- Nina Bonner
- Tammy Cole
- Louise Dobson
- Nikki Hudson
- Rachel Imison
- Bianca Langham-Pritchard
- Brooke Morrison
- Bianca Netzler
- Katrina Powell
- Angie Skirving
- Karen Smith
- Ngaire Smith
- Julie Towers
- Melanie Twitt

== Canada ==
Head coach:

- Amy Agulay (gk)
- Deb Cuthbert
- Sarah Forbes (gk)
- Lisa Faust
- Aoibhinn Grimes
- Stephanie Hume
- Meggan Hunt
- Jenny Johnson
- Becky Price
- Kelly Rezansoff
- Emily Rix
- Andrea Rushton
- Kristen Taunton
- Sue Tingley
- Julia Wong

== England ==
Head coach:

- Anna Bennett
- Jennie Bimson
- Sarah Blanks
- Melanie Clewlow
- Joanne Ellis
- Helen Grant
- Frances Houslop
- Leisa King
- Mandy Nicholson
- Carolyn Reid
- Helen Richardson
- Hilary Rose
- Jane Smith
- Rachel Walker
- Kate Walsh
- Lucilla Wright

== India ==
Head coach: Gurdial Singh Bhangu

- Kanti Baa
- Suman Bala
- Sanggai Chanu
- Tingonleima Chanu
- Ngasepam Pakpi Devi
- Suraj Lata Devi (c)
- Sita Gussain
- Saba Anjum Karim
- Amandeep Kaur
- Manjinder Kaur
- Mamta Kharab
- Jyoti Sunita Kullu
- Helen Mary
- Pritam Rani Siwach
- Masira Surin
- Sumrai Tete

== Malaysia ==
Head coach:

- Angela Kais
- Ayu Afnida Hamdani
- Catherine Lambor
- Chitra Devi Arumugam
- Intan Nurairah Ahmad Khusaini
- Kannagi Arumugam
- Khairunnisah Kamaruzaman
- Lisa Ludong
- Mizawati Bakri
- Nadia Abdul Rahman
- Nor Saliza Soobni
- Nurfaraha Hashim
- Nurhafizah Azman
- Roslizawati Rasidi
- Sebah Kari
- Siti Azura Yusuf

== New Zealand ==
Head coach:

- Sandy Bennett
- Helen Clarke
- Tara Drysdale
- Paula Enoka
- Amanda Christie
- Anne-Marie Irving
- Caryn Paewai
- Suzie Pearce
- Jaimee Provan
- Niniwa Roberts
- Rachel Robertson
- Moira Senior
- Colleen Gubb-Suddaby
- Rachel Sutherland
- Michelle Turner
- Diana Weavers

== Scotland ==
Head coach:

- Jane Burley
- Linda Clement
- Susan Gilmour
- Louise Gordon
- Alison Grant
- Kathryn Gray
- Samantha Judge
- Audrey Longmuir
- Claire Lampard
- Sue Macdonald
- Debra McLeod
- Tracey Robb
- Emma Rochlin
- Rhona Simpson
- Valerie Thomson
- Helen Walker

== South Africa ==
Head coach: Roz Howell

- Kerry Bee
- Caroline Birt
- Lindsey Carlisle (c)
- Pietie Coetzee
- Grazjyna Engelbrecht
- Natalie Haynes
- Jo Koornhof
- Anli Kotze
- Marsha Marescia
- Sophie Mayer
- Luntu Ntloko
- Bronwyn Ross
- Carina van Zijl
- Melinda Vos
- Susan Wessels
- Jenny Wilson

== See also ==
- Hockey at the 2002 Commonwealth Games – Men's team squads
