= Hockey at the 2002 Commonwealth Games – Women's tournament =

2002 Commonwealth Games – Women's hockey
Tournament details
- Host country: England
- City: Manchester
- Dates: 27 July – 3 August
- Teams: 8
- Venue: Belle Vue Hockey Centre

Final positions
- Champions: India (1st title)
- Runner-up: England
- Third place: Australia

Tournament statistics
- Matches played: 20
- Goals scored: 114 (5.7 per match)
- Top scorer: (South Africa) Pietie Coetzee (10 goals)

The second edition of the women's hockey tournament at the Commonwealth Games took place during the 2002 Commonwealth Games at the Belle Vue Complex in Manchester, England. The event started on Friday, 26 July, and ended on Saturday, 3 August 2002.

== Participating nations ==
Pool A	Pool B
Australia; Scotland; South Africa; Malaysia	Canada; England; India; New Zealand

== Results ==
=== Preliminary round ===
==== Pool A ====
Pos	Team	Pld	W	D	L	GF	GA	GD	Pts	Qualification
1	Australia	3	3	0	0	25	1	+24	9	Semi-finals
2	South Africa	3	2	0	1	16	5	+11	6	Quarter-finals
3	Scotland	3	1	0	2	7	7	0	3	Quarter-finals
4	Malaysia	3	0	0	3	0	35	−35	0	

Source: Fieldhockey Canada
Rules for classification: 1) points; 2) goal difference; 3) goals scored; 4) head-to-head result.

26 July 2002
11:00

Australia	3–0	Scotland
Powell 28'; Morrison 32'; Towers 65'	Report

Stadium:
Belle Vue Hockey Stadium

26 July 2002
13:00

Malaysia	0–11	South Africa
	Report	Mayer 3', 5', 11'; Coetzee 8', 34', 59'; Wilson 13', 62'; Wessels 24', 31'; Carlisle 51'

Stadium:
Belle Vue Hockey Stadium

27 July 2002
17:30

South Africa	1–4	Australia
Coetzee 36'	Report	Morrison 4'; Dobson 26', 28'; Towers 31'

Stadium:
Belle Vue Hockey Stadium

27 July 2002
19:30

Scotland	6–0	Malaysia
Thomson 35'; R. Simpson 40', 48'; MacDonald 50'; Gilmour 58'; Clement 65'	Report

Stadium:
Belle Vue Hockey Stadium

29 July 2002
11:00

Australia	18–0	Malaysia
Dobson 7', 37', 67'; Langham-Pritchard 11'; Banning 13', 48'; Hudson 14', 20', 22'; Morrison 25'; K. Smith 34', 59'; Towers 42'; Netzler 45'; N. Smith 46', 55', 62', 64'	Report

Stadium:
Belle Vue Hockey Stadium

29 July 2002
14:00

South Africa	4–1	Scotland
Koornof 42'; Cotzee 43', 45'; Wilson 58'	Report	Simpson 9'

Stadium:
Belle Vue Hockey Stadium

==== Pool B ====
Pos	Team	Pld	W	D	L	GF	GA	GD	Pts	Qualification
1	New Zealand	3	2	1	0	8	4	+4	7	Semi-finals
2	England	3	1	2	0	9	4	+5	5	Quarter-finals
3	India	3	1	1	1	3	4	−1	4	Quarter-finals
4	Canada	3	0	0	3	2	10	−8	0	

Source: Fieldhockey Canada
Rules for classification: 1) points; 2) goal difference; 3) goals scored; 4) head-to-head result.

26 July 2002
16:00

New Zealand	2–2	England
Roberts-Lang 29'; Turner 33'	Report	Grant 4'; Clewlow 55'

Stadium:
Belle Vue Hockey Stadium

26 July 2002
18:00

Canada	0–1	India
	Report	Suman 44'

Stadium:
Belle Vue Hockey Stadium

28 July 2002
09:00

India	1–3	New Zealand
Jyoti 16'	Report	Pearce 25'; Gubb-Suddaby 40'; Senior 67'

Stadium:
Belle Vue Hockey Stadium

28 July 2002
11:00

England	6–1	Canada
Smith 40', 50', 69'; Walsh 46'; Walker 56'; Bennett 66'	Report	Hunt 65'

Stadium:
Belle Vue Hockey Stadium

29 July 2002
16:00

England	1–1	India
Bennett 27'	Report	Suman 23'

Stadium:
Belle Vue Hockey Stadium

29 July 2002
18:00

New Zealand	3–1	Canada
Provan 24'; Roberts-Lang 41'; Senior 59'	Report	Cuthbert 11'

Stadium:
Belle Vue Hockey Stadium

=== Classification matches ===
==== Seventh and eighth place ====
1 August 2002
10:00

Malaysia	0–5	Canada
	Report	Taunton 11'; Johnson 24'; Grimes 27'; Tingley 65', 68'

Stadium:
Belle Vue Hockey Stadium

==== First to sixth place classification ====
Crossovers
31 July 2002
England	6
Scotland	1
31 July 2002
South Africa	3
India (a.e.t)	4

Semi-finals
1 August 2002
Australia	1
England	2
1 August 2002
New Zealand	1
India	2

Final
3 August 2002
England	2
India (a.e.t)	3
Third Place
3 August 2002
Australia	4
New Zealand	3

===== Quarter-finals =====
31 July 2002
10:00

South Africa	3–4 (a.e.t.)	India
Coetzee 8', 15'; Wilson 34'	Report	Pritam 46'; Jyoti 62', 64'; Suman 78'

Stadium:
Belle Vue Hockey Stadium

31 July 2002
12:30

England	6–1	Scotland
King 14', 55', 64'; Grant 31'; Blanks 40'; Walsh 48'	Report	Judge 50'

Stadium:
Belle Vue Hockey Stadium

===== Fifth and sixth place =====
1 August 2002
12:30

South Africa	4–3 (a.e.t.)	Scotland
Mayer 9'; Coetzee 27', 73'; Wilson 63'	Report	Rochlin 30'; E. Simpson 56'; Judge 68'

Stadium:
Belle Vue Hockey Stadium

===== Semi-finals =====
1 August 2002
16:00

New Zealand	1–2	India
Pearce 5'	Report	Jyoti 33'; Mamta 62'

Stadium:
Belle Vue Hockey Stadium

1 August 2002
18:30

Australia	1–2	England
Dobson 67'	Report	Walsh 17'; Grant 25'

Stadium:
Belle Vue Hockey Stadium

===== Third and fourth place =====
3 August 2002
13:00

Australia	4–3	New Zealand
Bakurski 8'; Banning 14'; N. Smith 44'; Powell 45'	Report	Christie 10'; Provan 23'; Pearce 70'

Stadium:
Belle Vue Hockey Stadium

===== Final =====
3 August 2002
15:30

England	2–3 (a.e.t.)	India
Blanks 35'; Grant 46'	Report	Mamta 21', 78'; Sita 31'

Stadium:
Belle Vue Hockey

== Statistics ==
=== Final standings ===
Pos	Team	Pld	W	D	L	GF	GA	GD	Pts	Final result
1st place, gold medalist(s)	India	6	4	1	1	12	10	+2	13	Gold Medal
2nd place, silver medalist(s)	England	6	3	2	1	19	9	+10	11	Silver Medal
3rd place, bronze medalist(s)	Australia	5	4	0	1	30	6	+24	12	Bronze Medal
4	New Zealand	5	2	1	2	12	10	+2	7	Fourth place
5	South Africa	5	3	0	2	23	12	+11	9	Eliminated in crossovers
6	Scotland	5	1	0	4	11	17	−6	3	Eliminated in crossovers
7	Canada	4	1	0	3	7	10	−3	3	Eliminated in group stage
8	Malaysia	4	0	0	4	0	40	−40	0	Eliminated in group stage

Source: Manchester2002

=== Goalscorers ===
There were 114 goals scored in 20 matches, for an average of 5.7 goals per match.

10 goals

- (South Africa) Pietie Coetzee

6 goals

- (Australia) Louise Dobson

5 goals

- (Australia) Ngaire Smith
- (South Africa) Jennifer Wilson

4 goals

- (England) Helen Grant
- (India) Jyoti Sunita Kullu
- (South Africa) Sophie Mayer

3 goals

- (Australia) Joanne Banning
- (Australia) Nicole Hudson
- (Australia) Brooke Morrison
- (Australia) Julie Towers
- (England) Leisa King
- (England) Jane Smith
- (England) Kate Walsh
- (India) Suman Bala
- (India) Mamta Kharab
- (New Zealand) Suzanne Pearce
- (Scotland) Rhona Simpson

2 goals

- (Australia) Katrina Powell
- (Australia) Karen Smith
- (Canada) Sue Tingley
- (England) Anna Bennett
- (England) Sarah Blanks
- (New Zealand) Jaimee Provan
- (New Zealand) Niniwa Roberts-Lang
- (New Zealand) Moira Senior
- (Scotland) Samantha Judge
- (South Africa) Susan Wessels

1 goal

- (Australia) Carmel Bakurski
- (Australia) Bianca Langham-Pritchard
- (Australia) Bianca Netzler
- (Canada) Deborah Cuthbert
- (Canada) Aoibhinn Grimes
- (Canada) Meggan Hunt
- (Canada) Jennifer Johnson
- (Canada) Kristen Taunton
- (England) Melanie Clewlow
- (England) Rachel Walker
- (India) Sita Gussain
- (India) Pritam Rani Siwach
- (New Zealand) Amanda Christie
- (New Zealand) Colleen Gubb-Suddaby
- (New Zealand) Michelle Turner
- (Scotland) Linda Clement
- (Scotland) Sue Gilmour
- (Scotland) Sue MacDonald
- (Scotland) Emma Rochlin
- (Scotland) Emma Simpson
- (Scotland) Valerie Thomson
- (South Africa) Lindsey Carlisle
- (South Africa) Johke Koornof

== Medallists ==
Games	Gold	Silver	Bronze
	India (IND); Kanti Baa; Suman Bala; Sanggai Chanu; Tingonleima Chanu; Ngasepam Pakpi Devi; Suraj Lata Devi (c); Sita Gussain; Saba Anjum Karim; Amandeep Kaur; Manjinder Kaur; Mamta Kharab; Jyoti Sunita Kullu; Helen Mary; Masira Surin; Pritam Rani Siwach; Sumrai Tete	England (ENG); Anna Bennett; Carolyn Reid; Lucilla Wright; Frances Houslop; Helen Grant; Helen Richardson; Hilary Rose; Jane Smith; Jennie Bimson; Joanne Ellis; Kate Walsh; Leisa King; Mandy Nicholson; Melanie Clewlow; Rachel Walker; Sarah Blanks	Australia (AUS); Angie Skirving; Bianca Langham-Pritchard; Bianca Netzler; Brooke Morrison; Carmel Bakurski; Joanne Banning; Julie Towers; Karen Smith; Katrina Powell; Louise Dobson; Melanie Twitt; Ngaire Smith; Nikki Hudson; Nina Bonner; Rachel Imison; Tammy Cole

== Awards ==
2002 women's hockey Commonwealth Games winners

India
First title

== Cultural depictions ==
A fictionalised version of the Indian team's victory at the 2002 Commonwealth Games was depicted in the 2007 film Chak De! India.
