= Hockey at the 2002 Commonwealth Games =

Field hockey at the 2002 Commonwealth Games
- Venue: Belle Vue Regional Hockey Centre
- Location: Manchester, England
- Dates: 26 July – 3 August
- Nations: 8 (men); 8 (women)

Hockey at the 2002 Commonwealth Games was the second appearance of Hockey at the Commonwealth Games. The events were held in Manchester, England, from 25 July to 4 August 2002.

The competition took place at the Belle Vue Regional Hockey Centre on Kirkmanshulme Lane.

Australia topped the field hockey medal table, by virtue of winning one gold medal and one bronze medal.

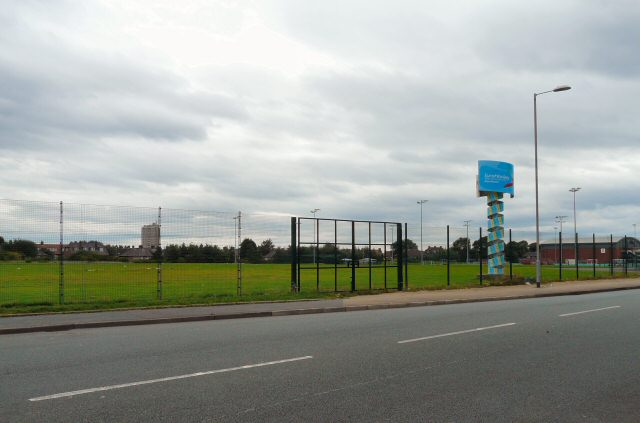
Belle Vue Regional Hockey Centre on Kirkmanshulme Lane

== Medal table ==
* Host nation (England)

| Rank | Nation | Gold | Silver | Bronze | Total |
|---|---|---|---|---|---|
| 1 | Australia | 1 | 0 | 1 | 2 |
| 2 | India | 1 | 0 | 0 | 1 |
| 3 | England* | 0 | 1 | 0 | 1 |
| 3 | New Zealand | 0 | 1 | 0 | 1 |
| 5 | Pakistan | 0 | 0 | 1 | 1 |
| Totals (5 entries) | | 2 | 2 | 2 | 6 |

== Men's tournament ==
=== Medalists ===
| Event | Gold | Silver | Bronze |
|---|---|---|---|
| Men | Australia; Australia; Aaron Hopkins; Ben Taylor; Bevan George; Brent Livermore; Craig Victory; Dean Butler; Jamie Dwyer; Liam de Young; Mark Hickman; Matthew Smith; Matthew Wells; Michael McCann; Paul Gaudoin; Scott Webster; Stephen Lambert; Troy Elder | New Zealand; New Zealand; Bevan Hari; Blair Hopping; Darren Smith; David Kosoof; Dean Couzins; Dion Gosling; Hayden Shaw; Michael Bevin; Mitesh Patel; Paul Woolford; Peter Stafford; Phil Burrows; Ryan Archibald; Simon Towns; Umesh Parag; Wayne McIndoe | Pakistan; Pakistan; Ahmed Alam; Ghazanfar Ali; Kamran Ashraf; Kashif Jawad; Mudassar Ali Khan; Muhammad Khalid; Muhammad Nadeem; Muhammad Qasim; Muhammad Saqlain; Muhammad Sarwar; Muhammad Shabbir; Muhammad Usman; Sohail Abbas; Tariq Imran; Waseem Ahmed; Zeeshan Ashraf |

== Women's tournament ==
=== Medalists ===
| Event | Gold | Silver | Bronze |
|---|---|---|---|
| Women | India; India; Kanti Baa; Suman Bala; Sanggai Chanu; Tingonleima Chanu; Ngasepam Pakpi Devi; Suraj Lata Devi (c); Sita Gussain; Saba Anjum Karim; Amandeep Kaur; Manjinder Kaur; Mamta Kharab; Jyoti Sunita Kullu; Helen Mary; Masira Surin; Pritam Rani Siwach; Sumrai Tete | England; England; Anna Bennett; Carolyn Reid; Cilla Wright; Frances Houslop; Helen Grant; Helen Richardson; Hilary Rose; Jane Smith; Jennie Bimson; Joanne Ellis; Kate Walsh; Leisha King; Mandy Nicholson; Melanie Clewlow; Rachel Walker; Sarah Blanks | Australia; Australia; Angela Skirving; Bianca Langham-Pritchard; Bianca Netzler; Brooke Morrison; Carmel Bakurski; Jo Banning; Julie Towers; Karen Smith; Katrina Powell; Louise Dobson; Melanie Twitt; Ngaire Smith; Nicole Hudson; Nina Bonner; Rachel Imison; Tammy Cole |
