= Field hockey at the 2002 Asian Games – Women's tournament =

Women's field hockey tournament at the 2002 Asian Games
Tournament details
- Host country: South Korea
- City: Busan
- Dates: 5–11 October 2002
- Teams: 4
- Venue: Gangseo Hockey Stadium

Medalists
gold medal	China
silver medal	India
bronze medal	Japan

Tournament statistics
- Matches played: 8
- Goals scored: 27 (3.38 per match)
- Top scorer: (China) Chen Zhaoxia (4 goals)

Women's field hockey at the 2002 Asian Games was held in Gangseo Hockey Stadium, Busan from October 5 to October 11, 2002.

== Squads ==
China	India	Japan	South Korea
Nie Yali; Long Fengyu; Chen Zhaoxia; Ma Yibo; Cheng Hui; Huang Junxia; Fu Baorong; Li Shuang; Tang Chunling; Zhou Wanfeng; Zhang Haiying; Hou Xiaolan; Chen Qiuqi; Wang Jiuyan; Zhang Shuang; Li Aili	Tingonleima Chanu; Amandeep Kaur; Suman Bala; Suraj Lata Devi; Sita Gussain; Sumrai Tete; Pritam Rani Siwach; Mamta Kharab; Jyoti Sunita Kullu; Helen Mary; Masira Surin; Adline Kerketta; Kanti Baa; Manjinder Kaur; Saba Anjum Karim; Sanggai Chanu	Rie Terazono; Keiko Miura; Akemi Kato; Yukari Yamamoto; Sachimi Iwao; Chie Kimura; Yuka Ogura; Sakae Morimoto; Kaori Chiba; Naoko Saito; Toshie Tsukui; Nami Miyazaki; Hiromi Hashimoto; Akiko Kitada; Erika Esaki; Mayumi Ono	Park Yong-sook; Kim Yoon-mi; Lee Jin-hee; Yoo Hee-joo; Lee Seon-ok; Ki Sook-hyun; Kim Eun-jin; Lee Mi-seong; Oh Ko-woon; Kim Seong-eun; Kim Jin-kyoung; Cho Jin-ju; Lee Eun-young; Lim Ju-young; Park Jeong-sook; Kang Na-young

== Results ==
All times are Korea Standard Time (UTC+09:00)

=== Preliminary round ===
==== Pool ====
Pos	Team	Pld	W	D	L	GF	GA	GD	Pts	Qualification
1	South Korea (H)	3	2	0	1	8	4	+4	6	Gold-medal match
2	China	3	2	0	1	5	2	+3	6	Gold-medal match
3	Japan	3	2	0	1	7	6	+1	6	Bronze-medal match
4	India	3	0	0	3	2	10	−8	0	Bronze-medal match

Source: Reddif
Rules for classification: 1) points; 2) goal difference; 3) goals scored; 4) head-to-head result.
(H) Hosts

==== Fixtures ====
5 October 2002
12:30

China	2–0	India
Chen Z. 38', 61'	Report

5 October 2002
15:00

South Korea	3–2	Japan
Kim E. 8'; Lee E. 29'; Lee M. 51'	Report	Iwao 44'; Saito 62'

7 October 2002
12:30

China	1–2	Japan
Tang 42'	Report	Ogura 33'; Morimoto 44'

7 October 2002
15:00

India	0–5	South Korea
	Report	Oh 32'; Kim J. 48'; Lee M. 59'; Kim E. 61', 67'

9 October 2002
12:30

South Korea	0–2	China
	Report	Zhou 45'; Chen Z. 63'

9 October 2002
15:00

India	2–3	Japan
Suman 59'; Jyoti 66'	Report	Miura 19', 69'; Kato 63'

=== Classification round ===
==== Bronze-medal match ====
11 October 2002
12:00

Japan	2–0	India
Morimoto 29', 44'	Report

==== Gold-medal match ====
11 October 2002
15:00

South Korea	1–2	China
Kim S. 58'	Report	Chen Z. 38'; Fu 43'

== Final standing ==
Rank	Team	Pld	W	D	L
1st place, gold medalist(s)	China	4	3	0	1
2nd place, silver medalist(s)	South Korea	4	2	0	2
3rd place, bronze medalist(s)	Japan	4	3	0	1
4	India	4	0	0	4
