= 2002 Women's Hockey World Cup Qualifying Playoff =

International hockey competition in England

Tournament details
- Host country: England
- City: Cannock
- Dates: 22–25 June 2002
- Teams: 2
- Venue: Cannock Hockey Club

Final positions
- Champions: United States
- Runner-up: India

Tournament statistics
- Matches played: 3
- Goals scored: 8 (2.67 per match)
- Top scorer: (United States) Tracey Fuchs (4 goals)

The 2002 Women's Hockey World Cup Qualifying Playoff was an international hockey competition contested by India and the United States. The tournament was held in Cannock, England from 22 to 25 June 2002.

The United States won the tournament, with one win and two draws, qualifying for the 2002 FIH World Cup.

== History ==
In September 2001, the United States had qualified to compete in the Intercontinental Cup in Abbeville and Amiens. Following the September 11 attacks however, the team were forced to withdraw due to the disruption of airline schedules. Subsequently, the FIH announced that the seventh placed team at the Intercontinental Cup would face the United States in a qualifying playoff.

India qualified for the playoff series as seventh placed team at the Intercontinental Cup, following Lithuania's withdrawal.

== Teams ==
India

Head coach:

1. Helen Mary (GK)
5. Sita Gussain
6. Sumrai Tete
8. Manjinder Kaur
9. Surinder Kaur
10. Mamta Kharab (C)
11. Pritam Rani Siwach
12. Tingonleima Chanu (GK)
14. Suraj Lata Devi
18. Adeline Kerketta
19. Sanggai Chanu
20. Jyoti Sunita Kullu
23. Pushpa Pradhan
28. Masira Surin
29. Amandeep Kaur
32. Suman Bala
United States

Head coach:

1. Mimi Smith
2. Kimberly Miller
3. Kristen McCann
4. Margaret Storrar (GK)
6. Melanie Meerschwam
7. Tracey Larson
8. Kelli Gannon
9. Tracey Fuchs (C)
10. Antoinette Lucas
11. Katie Kauffman
12. Jennifer Everett
13. Keli Smith
14. Carla Tagliente
15. Jill Reeve
17. Carrie Lingo
22. Katherine Barber

== Results ==
=== Pool ===
Pos	Team	Pld	W	D	L	GF	GA	GD	Pts	Qualification
1	United States	3	1	2	0	5	3	+2	5	2002 FIH World Cup
2	India	3	0	2	1	3	5	−2	2	

Source: USA Field Hockey
Rules for classification: 1) points; 2) goal difference; 3) goals scored; 4) head-to-head result.

=== Fixtures ===
22 June 2002
15:00

India	1–1	United States
Mamta 10'	Report	Fuchs 51'

Umpires:
Renée Cohen (NED)
Dawn Henning (ENG)

23 June 2002
15:00

United States	1–1	India
Fuchs 22'	Report	Gussain 48'

Umpires:
Dawn Henning (ENG)
Renée Cohen (NED)

25 June 2002
14:00

India	1–3	United States
Jyoti 19'	Report	Fuchs 38', 49'; Gannon 38'

Umpires:
Renée Cohen (NED)
Dawn Henning (ENG)

== Statistics ==
=== Final standings ===
1. United States
2. India

=== Goalscorers ===
There were 8 goals scored in 3 matches, for an average of 2.67 goals per match.

4 goals

- (United States) Tracey Fuchs

1 goal

- (India) Sita Gussain
- (India) Mamta Kharab
- (India) Jyoti Sunita Kullu
- (United States) Kelli Gannon
