= India at the 2002 Commonwealth Games =

- CG code: IND
- CGA: Indian Olympic Association
- Website: olympic.ind.in

in Manchester, England
- Competitors: 107 in 10 sports
- Officials: 33
- Medals Ranked 4th: Gold 30 Silver 22 Bronze 14 Total 66

Commonwealth Games appearances (overview)
- 1934; 1938; 1950; 1954; 1958; 1962; 1966; 1970; 1974; 1978; 1982; 1986; 1990; 1994; 1998; 2002; 2006; 2010; 2014; 2018; 2022; 2026; 2030

India competed at the 2002 Commonwealth Games held in Manchester, England, from 25 July to 4 August 2002. It was the country's thirteenth appearance at the Commonwealth Games since making its debut at the 1934 British Empire Games.

India achieved its best performance till then in the Commonwealth Games and won 69 medals, comprising 30 gold, 22 silver, and 17 bronze medals, to finish fourth in the overall medal table. The Indian women's hockey team won India's first ever gold medal in hockey.

== Medal summary ==
India won 69 medals, comprising 30 gold, 22 silver, and 17 bronze medals, to finish fourth in the overall medal table.

=== Medals by sport ===
Medals by sport
Sport	Gold	Silver	Bronze	Total
Shooting	14	7	3	24
Weightlifting	11	9	4	24
Boxing	1	1	1	3
Hockey	1	0	0	1
Wrestling	3	3	0	6
Athletics	0	1	1	2
Judo	0	1	1	2
Table tennis	0	0	3	3
Badminton	0	0	1	1
Total	30	22	17	69

=== Medals by day ===
Medals by day
Day	Date	Gold	Silver	Bronze	Total
1	25 July	0	0	0	0
2	26 July	0	0	0	0
3	27 July	1	1	0	2
4	28 July	3	1	0	4
5	29 July	3	0	1	4
6	30 July	4	5	5	14
7	31 July	3	2	3	8
8	1 August	4	3	1	8
9	2 August	2	4	0	6
10	3 August	10	1	1	12
11	4 August	0	3	3	6
	Total	30	22	17	69

=== Medals by gender ===
Medals by gender
Gender	Gold	Silver	Bronze	Total
Male	13	12	11	36
Female	17	10	3	30
Total	30	22	14	66

=== Medalists ===
List of medalists
Medal	Name	Sport	Event	Date
Gold	Abhinav Bindra; Sameer Ambekar	Shooting	Men's 10 m air rifle – pairs	27 July
Gold	Samaresh Jung; Vivek Singh	Shooting	Men's 50 m air rifle – pairs	28 July
Gold	Anjali Bhagwat; Suma Shirur	Shooting	Women's 10 m air rifle – pairs	28 July
Gold	Moraad Ali Khan; Rajyavardhan Singh Rathore	Shooting	Men's Double Trap – pairs	28 July
Gold	Anjali Bhagwat; Raj Kumari	Shooting	Women's 50 m rifle 3 positions – pairs	29 July
Gold	Jaspal Rana; Samaresh Jung	Shooting	Men's 25 m Standard Pistol – pairs	29 July
Gold	Mukesh Kumar; Bhanwar Lal Dhaka	Shooting	Men's 25 m Rapid Fire Pistol – pairs	29 July
Gold	Kunjarani Devi Nameirakpam	Weightlifting	Women's up to 48 kg – overall	30 July
Gold	Kunjarani Devi Nameirakpam	Weightlifting	Women's up to 48 kg – clean and jerk	30 July
Gold	Kunjarani Devi Nameirakpam	Weightlifting	Women's up to 48 kg – snatch	30 July
Gold	Jaspal Rana; Mahaveer Singh	Shooting	Men's 25 m Centre Fire Pistol – pairs	30 July
Gold	Sanamacha Chanu	Weightlifting	Women's up to 53 kg – overall	31 July
Gold	Sanamacha Chanu	Weightlifting	Women's up to 53 kg – clean and jerk	31 July
Gold	Sanamacha Chanu	Weightlifting	Women's up to 53 kg – snatch	31 July
Gold	Anjali Bhagwat	Shooting	Women's 10 m air rifle – singles	1 August
Gold	Rajyavardhan Singh Rathore	Shooting	Men's Double Trap – singles	1 August
Gold	Pratima Kumari	Weightlifting	Women's up to 63 kg – overall	1 August
Gold	Pratima Kumari	Weightlifting	Women's up to 63 kg – clean and jerk	1 August
Gold	Anjali Bhagwat	Shooting	Women's 50 m rifle 3 positions – singles	2 August
Gold	Jaspal Rana	Shooting	Men's 25 m Standard Pistol – singles	2 August
Gold	Mohammed Ali Qamar	Boxing	Men's Light Flyweight – up to 48 kg	3 August
Gold	Shailaja Pujari	Weightlifting	Women's up to 75 kg – overall	3 August
Gold	Shailaja Pujari	Weightlifting	Women's up to 75 kg – clean and jerk	3 August
Gold	Shailaja Pujari	Weightlifting	Women's up to 75 kg – snatch	3 August
Gold	India women's team: Amandeep Kaur; Sumrai Tete; Suman Bala; Kanti Baa; Sita Gussain; Tingongleima Chanu; Helen Mary; Ngasepam Pakpi Devi; Suraj Lata Devi; Masira Surin; Manjinder Kaur; Sanggai Chanu; Pritam Rani Siwach; Mamta Kharab; Jyoti Kullu; Saba Anjum	Hockey	Women's team	3 August
Gold	Charan Singh	Shooting	Men's 50 m rifle 3 positions – singles	3 August
Gold	Ramesh Kumar	Wrestling	Men's up to 66 kg	3 August
Gold	Krishan Kumar	Wrestling	Men's up to 55 kg	3 August
Gold	Palwinder Singh Cheema	Wrestling	Men's up to 120 kg	3 August
Gold	Jaspal Rana	Shooting	Men's 25 m Centre Fire Pistol – singles	3 August
Silver	Jaspal Rana; Samaresh Jung	Shooting	Men's 10 m Air Pistol – pairs	27 July
Silver	Shweta Chaudhari; Sheila Kanungo	Shooting	Women's 10 m Air Pistol – pairs	28 July
Silver	Thandava Muthu	Weightlifting	Men's up to 56 kg – overall	30 July
Silver	Vicky Batta	Weightlifting	Men's up to 56 kg – clean and jerk	30 July
Silver	Thandava Muthu	Weightlifting	Men's up to 56 kg – snatch	30 July
Silver	Neelam Jaswant Singh	Athletics	Women's Discus Throw	30 July
Silver	Akram Shah	Judo	Men's up to 60 kg	30 July
Silver	Abhinav Bindra	Shooting	Men's 10 m air rifle – singles	31 July
Silver	Samaresh Jung	Shooting	Men's 10 m Air Pistol – singles	31 July
Silver	Suma Shirur	Shooting	Women's 10 m air rifle – singles	1 August
Silver	Samaresh Jung	Shooting	Men's 50 m Pistol – singles	1 August
Silver	Prasmita Mangaraj	Weightlifting	Women's up to 63 kg – overall	1 August
Silver	Prasmita Mangaraj	Weightlifting	Women's up to 63 kg – clean and jerk	1 August
Silver	Prasmita Mangaraj	Weightlifting	Women's up to 63 kg – snatch	1 August
Silver	Raj Kumari	Shooting	Women's 50 m rifle 3 positions	2 August
Silver	Neelam Setti Laxmi	Weightlifting	Women's up to 69 kg – overall	2 August
Silver	Neelam Setti Laxmi	Weightlifting	Women's up to 69 kg – Clean an Jerk	2 August
Silver	Neelam Setti Laxmi	Weightlifting	Women's up to 69 kg – snatch	2 August
Silver	Som Bahadur	Boxing	Men's Featherweight – up to 57 kg	3 August
Silver	Anuj Kumar	Wrestling	Men's up to 84 kg	3 August
Silver	Shokinder Tomar	Wrestling	Men's up to 60 kg	4 August
Silver	Anil Kumar Mann	Wrestling	Men's up to 96 kg	4 August
Bronze	Anju Bobby George	Athletics	Women's long jump	29 July
Bronze	Vicky Batta	Weightlifting	Men's up to 56 kg – clean and jerk	30 July
Bronze	Thandava Muthu	Weightlifting	Men's up to 56 kg – snatch	30 July
Bronze	Charan Singh; Subbaiah Airira Pemmaiah	Shooting	Men's 50 m rifle 3 positions – pairs	30 July
Bronze	Chetan Baboor; Sourav Chakraborty; Somyadeep Roy; Subhajit Saha; Subramanian Raman	Table tennis	Men's team	30 July
Bronze	Bhupinder Singh	Judo	Men's up to 66 kg	30 July
Bronze	Sudhir Kumar	Weightlifting	Men's up to 69 kg – snatch	31 July
Bronze	Anwer Sultan	Shooting	Men's Trap – singles	31 July
Bronze	Jaspal Rana	Shooting	Men's 10 m Air Pistol – singles	31 July
Bronze	Prasmita Mangaraj	Weightlifting	Women's up to 63 kg – snatch	1 August
Bronze	Raman Subramanian; Chetan Baboor	Table tennis	Men's doubles	3 August
Bronze	Jitender Kumar	Boxing	Men's Middleweight – up to 75 kg	4 August
Bronze	Aparna Popat	Badminton	Women's Singles	4 August
Bronze	Chetan Baboor	Table tennis	Men's singles	4 August

== Competitors ==
The Indian contingent consisted of 107 athletes who competed in 10 sports, and 33 support staff.

Sport	Men	Women	Total
Athletics	1	4	5
Badminton	7	7	14
Boxing	7	—N/a	7
Gymnastics	5	0	5
Hockey	0	16	16
Judo	5	4	9
Shooting	12	8	20
Squash	1	0	1
Table tennis	5	5	10
Weightlifting	6	7	13
Wrestling	7	—N/a	7
Total	56	51	107

== Athletics ==
Athlete	Event	Qualification		Final	
Athlete	Event	Result	Rank	Result	Rank
Anju Bobby George	Women's long jump	6.36 m	3 q	6.49 m	5
Bobby Aloysius	Women's high jump	—N/a		1.87 m	4
Neelam Jaswant Singh	Women's discus throw	—N/a		58.49 m	2nd place, silver medalist(s)
Hardeep Kaur	Women's hammer throw	55.98 m	13	Did not advance	
Navpreet Singh	Men's shot put	NM		Did not advance	

Legend

- q – Qualified for the next round

== Badminton ==
Athlete	Event	Round of 16	Quarterfinal	Semifinal	Final / BM	
Athlete	Event	Opposition Score	Opposition Score	Opposition Score	Opposition Score	Rank
Pullela Gopichand	Men's Singles	Wojcikiewicz (CAN); W 3-0 (7-0, 7-1, 7-1)	Hann (MAS); L 0-3 (1-7, 1-7, 4-7)	Did not advance		
Nikhil Kanetkar	Men's Singles	Seng (MAS); L 2-3 (3-7, 7-4, 4-7, 7-4, 5-7)	Did not advance			
Abhinn Shyam Gupta	Men's Singles	Haughton (ENG); W 3-0 (8-6, 7-5, 7-3)	Vaughan (WAL); L 1-3 (4-7, 1-7, 7-3, 3-7)	Did not advance		
B. R. Meenakshi	Women's Singles	Morgan (WAL); L 0-3 (3-7, 3-7, 1-7)	Did not advance			
Trupti Murgunde	Women's Singles	Ng (MAS); L 2-3 (7-5, 2-7, 3-7, 7-4, 2-7)	Did not advance			
Aparna Popat	Women's Singles	Amrita Sawaram (MRI); W 3-0 (7-0, 7-1, 7-0)	Julien (CAN); W 3-0 (7-1, 7-0, 7-0)	Hallam (ENG); L 0-3 (3-7, 3-7, 1-7)	Did not advance	3rd place, bronze medalist(s)
V. Diju; Sanave Thomas	Men's doubles	—N/a	Clark / Robertson (ENG); L 3-0 (1-7, 4-7, 6-8)	Did not advance		

Legend

- W – Win; L – Loss;

== Boxing ==
India competed in six boxing events at the 2002 Commonwealth Games. Mohammed Ali Qamar won the gold medal in the light-flyweight division. Som Bahadur and Jitender Kumar won bronze medals.

Athlete	Event	Preliminary	Quarterfinal	Semifinal	Final	Rank
Athlete	Event	Opposition Result	Opposition Result	Opposition Result	Opposition Result	Rank
Mohammed Ali Qamar	Light-flyweight 48 kg	Shah (PAK); W RSC	Keketsi (LES); W RSC	Ajagbe (NGR); W 27:13	Langley (ENG); W 27:25	1st place, gold medalist(s)
Dingko Singh	Bantamweight 54 kg	Letuka (LES); L 14:12	Did not advance			
Gyanendra Kumar Singh	Bantamweight 54 kg	Masuku (SWZ); L 37:19	Did not advance			
Som Bahadur	Featherweight 57 kg	Madoti (NGR); W RSC	Sekotswe (BOT); W 35:29	Veikko (NZL); W RSC	Ali (PAK); L 10:28	3rd place, bronze medalist(s)
Reji Ramanand	Lightweight 60 kg	Morris (ENG); L RSC	Did not advance			
Jitender Kumar	Middleweight 75 kg	Farmer (ENG); W KO	Abdulsalam (NGR); W 16:14	Birch (ENG); L 23:32	Did not advance	3rd place, bronze medalist(s)
Harpal Singh	Super heavyweight +91 kg	Macaque (MRI); L 18:20	Did not advance			

Legend

- W – Win; L – Loss;
- KO - Knockout
- RSC - Referee Stops Contest

== Gymnastics ==
Athlete	Event	Result	Rank
Vikas Pandey	Men's all-around	50.300	11
Mayank Srivastava	Men's all-around	49.000	14
Rohit Yadav	Men's parallel bars	7.675	8
Vikas Pandey	Men's pommel horse	8.312	6
Vikash Pandey; Mayank Srivastava; Rohit Yadav; Mohit Yadav; Abhinav Dixit	Men's team	151.600	6

== Hockey ==
=== Women's team ===
Roster

- Kanti Baa
- Suman Bala
- Sanggai Chanu
- Tingonleima Chanu
- Ngasepam Pakpi Devi
- Suraj Lata Devi (c)
- Sita Gussain
- Saba Anjum Karim
- Amandeep Kaur
- Manjinder Kaur
- Mamta Kharab
- Jyoti Sunita Kullu
- Helen Mary
- Masira Surin
- Pritam Rani Siwach
- Sumrai Tete

Pool B

Team	Pts	Pld	W	D	L	GF	GA	GD	Qualification
New Zealand	7	3	2	1	0	8	4	+4	Semifinals
England	5	3	1	2	0	9	4	+5	Quarterfinals
India	4	3	1	1	1	3	4	-1	Quarterfinals
Canada	0	3	0	0	3	2	10	-8	

26 July 2002
18:00

Canada	0–1	India
	Report	Suman 44'

Stadium:
Belle Vue Hockey Stadium

28 July 2002
09:00

India	1–3	New Zealand
Jyoti 16'	Report	Pearce 25'; Gubb-Suddaby 40'; Senior 67'

Stadium:
Belle Vue Hockey Stadium

29 July 2002
16:00

England	1–1	India
Bennett 27'	Report	Suman 23'

Stadium:
Belle Vue Hockey Stadium

Quarter-finals

31 July 2002
10:00

South Africa	3–4 (a.e.t.)	India
Coetzee 8', 15'; Wilson 34'	Report	Pritam 46'; Jyoti 62', 64'; Suman 78'

Stadium:
Belle Vue Hockey Stadium

Semi-finals

1 August 2002
16:00

New Zealand	1–2	India
Pearce 5'	Report	Jyoti 33'; Mamta 62'

Stadium:
Belle Vue Hockey Stadium

Gold-medal match

3 August 2002
15:30

England	2–3 (a.e.t.)	India
Blanks 35'; Grant 46'	Report	Mamta 21', 78'; Sita 31'

Stadium:
Belle Vue Hockey

== Judo ==
Athlete	Event	Preliminary	Quarterfinal	Semifinal	Repechage 1	Repechage 2	Final / BM	Rank
Athlete	Event	Opposition Result	Opposition Result	Opposition Result	Opposition Result	Opposition Result	Opposition Result	Rank
Akram Shah	Men's 60 kg			Cole (WAL); W	—N/a		Fallon (ENG); L	2nd place, silver medalist(s)
Bhupinder Singh	Men's 66 kg		Mayne (NIR); W	Warren (ENG); L	—N/a		Young (AUS); W	3rd place, bronze medalist(s)
Yashpal Solanki	Men's 73 kg	Hill (AUS); L	Did not advance		Ewers (WAL); L	Did not advance		
Vinod Solanki	Men's 81 kg	Agbugbuah (GHA); W	Slyfield (NZL); L	Did not advance	—N/a	Omagbaluwaje (NGR); W	Preston (WAL); L	5
Virender Singh	Men's 90 kg	Vidler (SCO); L	Did not advance					
Kamla Rawat	Women's 48 kg	Robertson (SCO); L Moothoo (MRI); W Livinus (NGR); L	Did not advance					
Angom Anita Chanu	Women's 52 kg	Singleton (ENG); L	Did not advance					
Devi Brojeshori	Women's 57 kg	—N/a	Pekli (AUS); L	Did not advance	—N/a	Jones (NZL); L	Cox (ENG); L	5

Legend

- W – Won
- L – Lost

== Shooting ==
Shooting was the most successful sport for India at the 2002 Commonwealth Games with 24 medals including fourteen gold, seven silver, and three bronze medals.

Athlete	Event	Preliminary		Final	
Athlete	Event	Points	Rank	Points	Rank
Samaresh Jung	Men's 10 m air pistol		Q	674.8	2nd place, silver medalist(s)
Jaspal Rana	Men's 10 m air pistol		Q	674.7	3rd place, bronze medalist(s)
Shweta Chaudhary	Women's 10 m air pistol		Q	467.1	6
Sheila Kanungo	Women's 10 m air pistol	363	13	Did not advance	
Samaresh Jung; Jaspal Rana	Men's 10 m air pistol – pairs	—N/a		1137	2nd place, silver medalist(s)
Shweta Chaudhary; Sheila Kanungo	Women's 10 m air pistol – pairs	—N/a		744	2nd place, silver medalist(s)
Abhinav Bindra	Men's 10 m air rifle		Q	691.4	2nd place, silver medalist(s)
Sameer Ambekar	Men's 10 m air rifle		Q	689.2	5
Anjali Bhagwat	Women's 10 m air rifle		Q	500.8 GR	1st place, gold medalist(s)
Suma Shirur	Women's 10 m air rifle		Q	500.0	2nd place, silver medalist(s)
Abhinav Bindra; Sameer Ambekar	Men's 10 m air rifle – pairs	—N/a		1184	1st place, gold medalist(s)
Anjali Bhagwat; Suma Shirur	Women's 10 m air rifle – pairs	—N/a		795 GR	1st place, gold medalist(s)
Bhanwar Lal Dhaka	Men's rapid-fire pistol	563	7	Did not advance	
Mukesh Kumar	Men's rapid-fire pistol	558	11	Did not advance	
Bhanwar Lal Dhaka; Mukesh Kumar	Men's 25 m rapid-fire pistol – pairs	—N/a		1141	
Shweta Chaudhary	Women's 25 m sport pistol		Q	664.0	6
Sushma Rana	Women's 25 m sport pistol		Q	661.9	8
Shweta Chaudhary; Sushma Rana	Women's 25 m sport pistol – pairs	—N/a		1118	5
Samaresh Jung	Men's 25 m standard pistol	—N/a		556	9
Jaspal Rana	Men's 25 m standard pistol	—N/a		574 GR	1st place, gold medalist(s)
Samaresh Jung; Jaspal Rana	Men's 25 m standard pistol – pairs	—N/a		1130	1st place, gold medalist(s)
Samaresh Jung	Men's 50 m free pistol		Q	652.8	2nd place, silver medalist(s)
Vivek Singh	Men's 50 m free pistol	529	13	Did not advance	
Samaresh Jung; Vivek Singh	Men's 50 m free pistol – pairs	—N/a		1088	1st place, gold medalist(s)
Charan Singh	Men's 50 m rifle three positions		Q	1251.5	1st place, gold medalist(s)
Subbaiah Pemmaiah	Men's 50 m rifle three positions	1137	13	Did not advance	
Anjali Bhagwat	Women's 50 m rifle three positions		Q	678.0 GR	1st place, gold medalist(s)
Raj Kumari	Women's 50 m rifle three positions		Q	662.2	2nd place, silver medalist(s)
Charan Singh; Subbaiah Pemmaiah	Men's 50 m rifle three positions – pairs	—N/a		2266	3rd place, bronze medalist(s)
Anjali Bhagwat; Raj Kumari	Women's 50 m rifle three positions – pairs	—N/a		1140	1st place, gold medalist(s)
Subbaiah Pemmaiah	Men's 50 m rifle prone	587	10	Did not advance	
Abhijeet Konduskar	Men's 50 m rifle prone	581	17	Did not advance	
Kuheli Gangulee	Women's 50 m rifle prone	565	22	Did not advance	
Meena Kumari	Women's 50 m rifle prone	575	16	Did not advance	
Subbaiah Pemmaiah; Abhijeet Konduskar	Men's 50 m rifle prone – pairs	—N/a		1165	6
Kuheli Gangulee; Meena Kumari	Women's 50 m rifle prone – pairs	—N/a		1155	8
Jaspal Rana	Men's centre-fire pistol		Q	583	1st place, gold medalist(s)
Mahaveer Singh	Men's centre-fire pistol	570	10	Did not advance	
Jaspal Rana; Mahaveer Singh	Men's centre-fire pistol – pairs	—N/a		1150	1st place, gold medalist(s)
Manavjit Singh Sandhu	Men's clay pigeon trap	115	11	Did not advance	
Anwer Sultan	Men's clay pigeon trap		Q	142	3rd place, bronze medalist(s)
Manavjit Singh Sandhu; Anwer Sultan	Men's clay pigeon trap – pairs	—N/a		184	5
Moraad Ali Khan	Men's double trap		Q	181	6
Rajyavardhan Singh Rathore	Men's double trap		Q	191 GR	1st place, gold medalist(s)
Ali Khan Moraad; Rajyavardhan Singh Rathore	Men's double trap – pairs	—N/a		184	1st place, gold medalist(s)

Legend

- Q – Qualified for the next round

== Squash ==
Athlete	Event	First Round	Second Round	Third Round	Quarterfinal	Semifinal	Final / BM	
Athlete	Event	Opposition Result	Opposition Result	Opposition Result	Opposition Result	Opposition Result	Opposition Result	Rank
Ritwik Bhattacharya	Men's singles	Rabess (DOM); W 9-2, 9-4, 9-5	Palmer (AUS); L 6–9, 2–9, 5–9	Did not advance				

== Table tennis ==
Athlete	Event	Round of 64	Round of 32	Round of 16	Quarterfinal	Semifinal	Final / BM	Rank
Athlete	Event	Opposition Result	Opposition Result	Opposition Result	Opposition Result	Opposition Result	Opposition Result	Rank
Chetan Baboor	Men's singles		W	St. Louis (TTO); W 5-1	Ayemojuba (NGR); W 5-2	Huang (CAN); L 1-4	Did not advance	3rd place, bronze medalist(s)
Sourav Chakraborty	Men's singles		L	Did not advance				
Raman Subramanian	Men's singles		L	Did not advance				
Soumyadeep Roy	Men's singles		L	Did not advance				
Subhajit Saha	Men's singles		L	Did not advance				
Poulomi Ghatak	Women's singles	—N/a	W	Chunli (NZL); L 0-4	Did not advance			
Nandita Saha	Women's singles	—N/a	W	Fern (SIN); L 1-4	Did not advance			
Mouma Das	Women's singles	—N/a	W	Lijuan (CAN); L 0-4	Did not advance			
Mantu Ghosh	Women's singles	—N/a	L	Did not advance				
N. R. Indu	Women's singles	—N/a	L	Did not advance				
Subramaniam Raman; Chetan Baboor	Men's doubles	—N/a		Gita / Mutambuze (UGA); W 3-0	Toriola / Merotohun (NGR); W 3-0	Baggaley / Herbert (ENG); L 2-3	Did not advance	3rd place, bronze medalist(s)
Sourav Chakraborty; Subhajit Saha	Men's doubles	—N/a		L	Did not advance			
N. R. Indu; Mantu Ghosh	Women's doubles	—N/a		Daunton / Lake (WAL); W 3-2	Li / Jing (SIN); L 0-3	Did not advance		
Poulomi Ghatak; Mouma Das	Women's doubles	—N/a		L	Did not advance			
Soumyadeep Roy; Mouma Das	Mixed doubles	—N/a		Zhang / Jing (SIN); L 0-3	Did not advance			
Chetan Baboor; N. R. Indu	Mixed doubles	—N/a		Baggaley / Walker (ENG); L 0-3	Did not advance			
Sourav Chakraborty; Poulomi Ghatak	Mixed doubles	—N/a		Cai / Zhang (SIN); L 0-3	Did not advance			
Subramaniam Raman; Mantu Ghosh	Mixed doubles	—N/a		Taole / Ntisane (LES); W 3-0	L	Did not advance		
Subramaniam Raman; Chetan Baboor; Sourav Chakraborty; Subhajit Saha; Soumyadeep Roy	Men's team	—N/a			Canada; W 3–2	England; L 1–3	Did not advance	3rd place, bronze medalist(s)
Poulomi Ghatak; Nandita Saha; Mantu Ghosh; Mouma Das; N. R. Indu	Women's team	—N/a			Australia; L 1–3	Did not advance		

Legend

- W – Win; L – Loss

== Weightlifting ==
Thirteen Indians competed in ten weightlifting events at the 2002 Commonwealth Games. Indian weightlifters won 27 medals, including 11 gold medals.

Athlete	Event	Snatch		Clean & jerk		Overall	
Athlete	Event	Result	Rank	Result	Rank	Result	Rank
Vickey Batta	Men's 56 kg	107.5 kg	4	135.0 kg	2nd place, silver medalist(s)	242.5 kg	3rd place, bronze medalist(s)
Thandava Muthu	Men's 56 kg	112.5 kg	2nd place, silver medalist(s)	132.5 kg	3rd place, bronze medalist(s)	245.0 kg	2nd place, silver medalist(s)
Krishnan Madasamy	Men's 62 kg	DQ					
Govinda Vadivelu	Men's 69 kg	122.5 kg	8	162.5 kg	5	285.0 kg	6
Padmaraju Kumar	Men's 69 kg	135.0 kg	3rd place, bronze medalist(s)	147.5 kg	7	282.5 kg	7
Satheesha Rai	Men's 77 kg	DQ					
Kunjarani Devi Nameirakpam	Men's 48 kg	75.0 kg	1st place, gold medalist(s)	92.5 kg	1st place, gold medalist(s)	167.5 kg	1st place, gold medalist(s)
Sanamacha Chanu	Women's 53 kg	82.5 kg	1st place, gold medalist(s)	100.0 kg	1st place, gold medalist(s)	182.5 kg	1st place, gold medalist(s)
Sunaina Anand	Women's 58 kg	85.0 kg	3rd place, bronze medalist(s)	107.5 kg	3rd place, bronze medalist(s)	192.5 kg	3rd place, bronze medalist(s)
Pratima Kumari	Women's 63 kg	87.5 kg	2nd place, silver medalist(s)	117.5 kg	1st place, gold medalist(s)	205.0 kg	1st place, gold medalist(s)
Prasmita Mangaraj	Women's 63 kg	85.0 kg	3rd place, bronze medalist(s)	110.0 kg	2nd place, silver medalist(s)	195.0 kg	2nd place, silver medalist(s)
Neelam Setti Laxmi	Women's 69 kg	95.0 kg	2nd place, silver medalist(s)	110.0 kg	2nd place, silver medalist(s)	205.0 kg	2nd place, silver medalist(s)
Shailaja Pujari	Women's 75 kg	97.5 kg	1st place, gold medalist(s)	125.0 kg	1st place, gold medalist(s)	222.5 kg	1st place, gold medalist(s)

== Wrestling ==
India competed in seven events, and won three gold medals and three silver medals in wrestling at the 2002 Commonwealth Games.

Freestyle men

Athlete	Event	Competition rounds			Semifinal	Final / BM	Rank
Athlete	Event	Opposition Result	Opposition Result	Opposition Result	Semifinal	Final / BM	Rank
Krishan Kumar	55 kg	Williams (RSA); W	Homateni (NAM); W	Tarash (AUS); W	—N/a	Japaridze (CAN); W	1st place, gold medalist(s)
Shokinder Tomar	60 kg	Vaessler (NAM); W	O'Brien (AUS); W	—N/a		Sissaouri (CAN); L	2nd place, silver medalist(s)
Ramesh Kumar	66 kg	Ciake (CMR); W	Ueresi (SOL); W	Devoy (SCO); W	Jessey (NGR); W	Ewers (CAN); W	1st place, gold medalist(s)
Sujeet Maan	74 kg	Iutana (SAM); L	Opiah (NGR); L	Did not advance			
Anuj Chaudhary	84 kg	Kamdem (CMR); W	Kelly (AUS); W	Bianco (SCO); W	Chatha (ENG); W	Ugoalah (CAN); L	2nd place, silver medalist(s)
Anil Kumar Mann (Note: Anil Kumar Mann initially won the bronze medal in the 96 kg category. However, later when silver medalist Victor Kodei was stripped off his medal for a failed drug test, Mann was upgraded to a silver medal.)	96 kg	Kodei (NGR); L	—N/a			Praporshchikov (AUS); W	2nd place, silver medalist(s)
Palwinder Singh Cheema	120 kg	Nuha (GAM); W	Abdullah (AUS); W	—N/a		Kirschner (CAN); W	1st place, gold medalist(s)
