= 2002 Women's Hockey Champions Challenge =

International field hockey tournament

Tournament details
- Host country: South Africa
- City: Johannesburg
- Teams: 6
- Venue: Randburg Hockey Stadium

Final positions
- Champions: England (1st title)
- Runner-up: South Korea
- Third place: India

Tournament statistics
- Matches played: 18
- Goals scored: 60 (3.33 per match)
- Top scorer: (India) Jyoti Sunita Kullu (5 goals)

The 2002 Women's Hockey Champions Challenge was the inaugural edition of the field hockey championship for women. It was held in Johannesburg, South Africa from 9–17 February 2002.

== Squads ==
England
1. Anna Bennett
2. Jennie Bimson
3. Sarah Blanks
4. Kirsty Bowden
6. Melanie Clewlow (c)
7. Helen Grant
8. Imogen Robertson
9. Leisa King
10. Denise Marston-Smith
14. Helen Richardson
15. Katy Roberts (GK)
16. Hilary Rose (GK)
19. Kate Walsh
20. Lisa Wooding
21. Lucilla Wright
22. Alex Danson
26. Frances Houslop
27. Isabel Palmer
India
1. Tingonleima Chanu (c)
2. Amandeep Kaur
3. Suman Bala
4. Suraj Lata Devi
5. Sita Gussain
6. Sumrai Tete
7. Nidhi Mukesh Kumar
8. Surinder Kaur
9. Pritam Rani Siwach
10. Mamta Kharab
11. Jyoti Sunita Kullu
12. Helen Mary (GK)
13. Pushpa Pradhan
14. Masira Surin
16. Agnecia Lugun
18. Ngasepam Pakpi Devi
22. Shahina Kispotta
26. Sanggai Chanu
Russia
1. Qxana Boiko (GK)
2. Natalia Kravtchenko
3. Tatiana Timonina
4. Natalia Verchinina
5. Tatiana Sosnikhina
6. Olga Velmatkina
7. Galina Timchina
8. Olga Nikolayeva
9. Tatiana Vassioukova (c)
10. Elena Polovkova
11. Galina Bassaitchuk
12. Eketerina Rastorgueva
15. Svetlana Grigorreva
16. Irina Piskounova
17. Irina Sviridova
18. Tatiana Ioudovskaia
28. Galina Terentieva (GK)
South Africa
1. Caroline Birt (GK)
2. Inke van Wyk
3. Marissa Alves
4. Jacqui Benkenstein
5. Carina van Zyl
7. Candice Forword
8. Marsha Marescia
9. Linda van Breda
10. Johke Koornhof
11. Sophie Mayer
12. Lindsey Carlisle (c)
14. Kerry Bee
15. Pietie Coetzee
16. Jenny Wilson
21. Julia Henry
22. Luntu Ntloko
31. Susan Wessels
South Korea
1. Park Yong-Sook (GK)
2. Kim Yoon
4. Yoo Hee-Joo
5. Lee Seon-Ok
6. Ki Sook-Hyun
7. Kim Eun-Jin
8. Lee Mi-Seon
9. Oh Ko-Woon
10. Han Yu-Kyung
11. Kim Seong-Eun
12. Kim Jin-Kyoyng
13. Jo Jin-Ju
14. Kim Gyeong
15. Kim Seo-Hee
16. Lim Ju-Young (GK)
17. Kim Hyun-Ae
18. Park Jeong-Sook
20. Lee Eun-Young (c)
United States
1. Tamika Smith
2. Kimberly Miller
3. Kristen McCann
4. Margaret Storrar (GK)
5. Tara Jelley
6. Melanie Meerschwam
7. Tracey Larson
9. Tracey Fuchs (c)
10. Antoinette Lucas
11. Katherine Kauffman
13. Keli Smith
14. Carla Tagliente
15. Jill Reeve
17. Carrie Lingo
21. Natalie Dawson
22. Kate Barber
23. Jill Dedman (GK)

== Results ==
=== Group stage ===
Pos	Team	Pld	W	D	L	GF	GA	GD	Pts	Qualification
1	South Korea	5	4	0	1	10	6	+4	12	Advanced to Final
2	England	5	3	1	1	8	7	+1	10	Advanced to Final
3	India	5	2	2	1	10	9	+1	8	
4	South Africa (H)	5	2	1	2	15	8	+7	7	
5	United States	5	1	2	2	5	7	−2	5	
6	Russia	5	0	0	5	7	18	−11	0	

Source: FIH
Rules for classification: 1) points; 2) goal difference; 3) goals scored; 4) head-to-head result.
(H) Hosts

==== Fixtures ====
9 February 2002
14:00

England	3–3	India
King 13'; Marston-Smith 15'; Clewlow 23'	Report	Jyoti 20', 35'; Pritam 43'

Umpires:
Lesley Nunn (RSA)
Gina Spitaleri (ITA)

9 February 2002
16:15

Russia	1–3	South Korea
Sviridova 34'	Report	Park J. 18'; Lee E. 41'; Kim S. 60'

Umpires:
Renáte Peters (GER)
Jun Kentwell (USA)

9 February 2002
18:30

South Africa	2–2	United States
Wilson 22'; Koornhof 25'	Report	Tagliente 44'; Lucas 70'

Umpires:
Lyn Farrell (NZL)
Judith Barnesby (AUS)

10 February 2002
14:30

South Korea	0–1	England
	Report	King 55'

Umpires:
Corinne Cornelius (RSA)
Gina Spitaleri (ITA)

10 February 2002
17:00

India	1–0	South Africa
Jyoti 13'	Report

Umpires:
Jun Kentwell (USA)
Lee Mi-Ok (KOR)

10 February 2002
19:30

United States	2–1	Russia
Lucas 47'; Larson 52'	Report	Bassaitchuk 60'

Umpires:
Lyn Farrell (NZL)
Corinne Cornelius (RSA)

12 February 2002
14:30

India	1–1	United States
Sanggai 5'	Report	Reeve 64'

Umpires:
Corinne Cornelius (RSA)
Lee Mi-Ok (KOR)

12 February 2002
17:00

England	2–1	Russia
Clewlow 28'; Robertson 68'	Report	Bassaitchuk 52'

Umpires:
Lyn Farrell (NZL)
Lesley Nunn (RSA)

12 February 2002
19:30

South Africa	2–3	South Korea
Wessels 10', 29'	Report	Kim Y. 11'; Lee S. 36', 63'

Umpires:
Renáte Peters (GER)
Gina Spitaleri (ITA)

13 February 2002
15:00

United States	0–2	England
	Report	Clewlow 2'; Blanks 7'

Umpires:
Corinne Cornelius (USA)
Lee Mi-Ok (KOR)

13 February 2002
17:30

South Korea	3–2	India
Lee S. 22'; Kim E. 43'; Lee E. 63'	Report	Mamta 24'; Jyoti 37'

Umpires:
Renáte Peters (GER)
Lesley Nunn (RSA)

13 February 2002
19:45

South Africa	8–2	Russia
Van Zikl 3', 66'; Coetzee 7', 41'; Wilson 19'; Wessels 32'; Van Breda 38'; Bee 50'	Report	Kravtchenko 46'; Vassioukova 60'

Umpires:
Judith Barnesby (AUS)
Jun Kentwell (USA)

15 February 2002
15:00

Russia	2–3	India
Rastorgueva 44', 46'	Report	Jyoti 14'; Suman 61'; Sanggai 63'

Umpires:
Corinne Cornelius (RSA)
Gina Spitaleri (ITA)

15 February 2002
17:15

South Korea	1–0	United States
Lee E. 8'	Report

Umpires:
Judith Barnesby (AUS)
Lesley Nunn (RSA)

15 February 2002
19:30

England	0–3	South Africa
	Report	Wessels 33'; Wilson 59'; Coetzee 68'

Umpires:
Lyn Farrell (NZL)
Lee Mi-Ok (KOR)

=== Classification ===
==== Fifth and sixth place ====
17 February 2002
10:00

United States	1–0 (a.e.t.)	Russia
Fuchs 75'	Report

Umpires:
Renáte Peters (GER)
Lee Mi-Ok (KOR)

==== Third and fourth place ====
17 February 2002
12:30

India	1–0	South Africa
Suman 46'	Report

Umpires:
Lyn Farrell (NZL)
Jun Kentwell (USA)

==== Final ====
17 February 2002
15:00

South Korea	1–2	England
Kim Y. 13'	Report	Bennett 47'; Wright 56'

Umpires:
Judith Barnesby (AUS)
Gina Spitaleri (ITA)

== Statistics ==
=== Final standings ===
Pos	Team	Pld	W	D	L	GF	GA	GD	Pts	Qualification
1st place, gold medalist(s)	England	6	4	1	1	10	8	+2	13	Qualified for FIH Champions Trophy
2nd place, silver medalist(s)	South Korea	6	4	0	2	11	8	+3	12	Qualified for FIH Champions Trophy
3rd place, bronze medalist(s)	India	6	3	2	1	11	9	+2	11	
4	South Africa (H)	6	2	1	3	15	9	+6	7	
5	United States	6	2	2	2	6	7	−1	8	
6	Russia	6	0	0	6	7	19	−12	0	

Source: FIH
(H) Hosts
