= Shooting at the 2002 Commonwealth Games =

- Venue: National Shooting Centre
- Location: Bisley, Surrey, England
- Dates: 25 July to 4 August 2002

Shooting at the 2002 Commonwealth Games was the ninth appearance of Shooting at the Commonwealth Games. Although the Commonwealth Games events were held in Manchester, England, from 25 July to 4 August 2002, the shooting events took place in Surrey and featured a record 40 disciplines (an increase of 10 from 1998).

The shooting events were held at the National Shooting Centre in Bisley, Surrey (over 200 miles from Manchester). The rifle and pistol centre and the National Clay Shooting Centre were both constructed specifically for the Games.

India topped the shooting medal table by virtue of winning 14 gold medals.

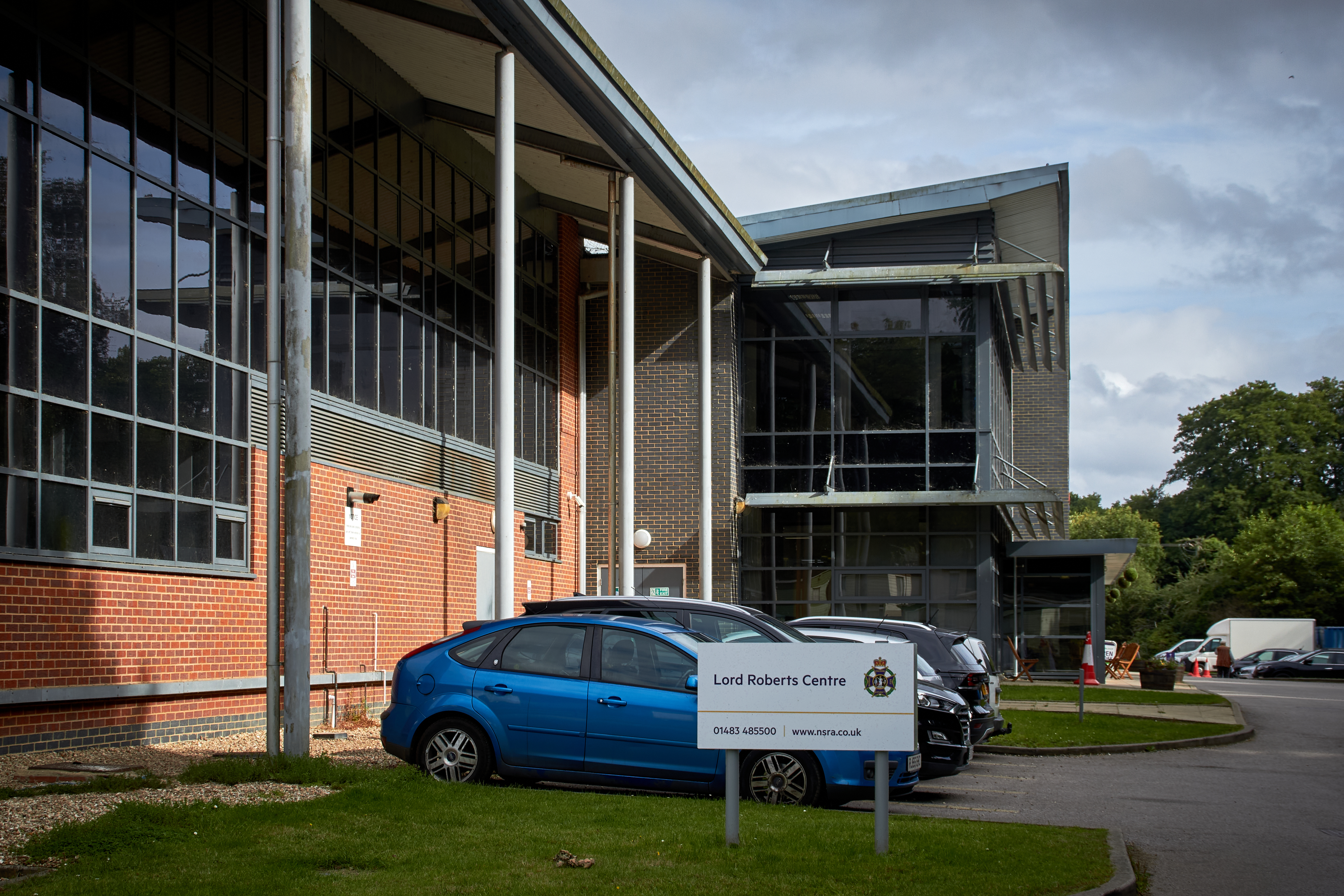
Rifle and pistol centre

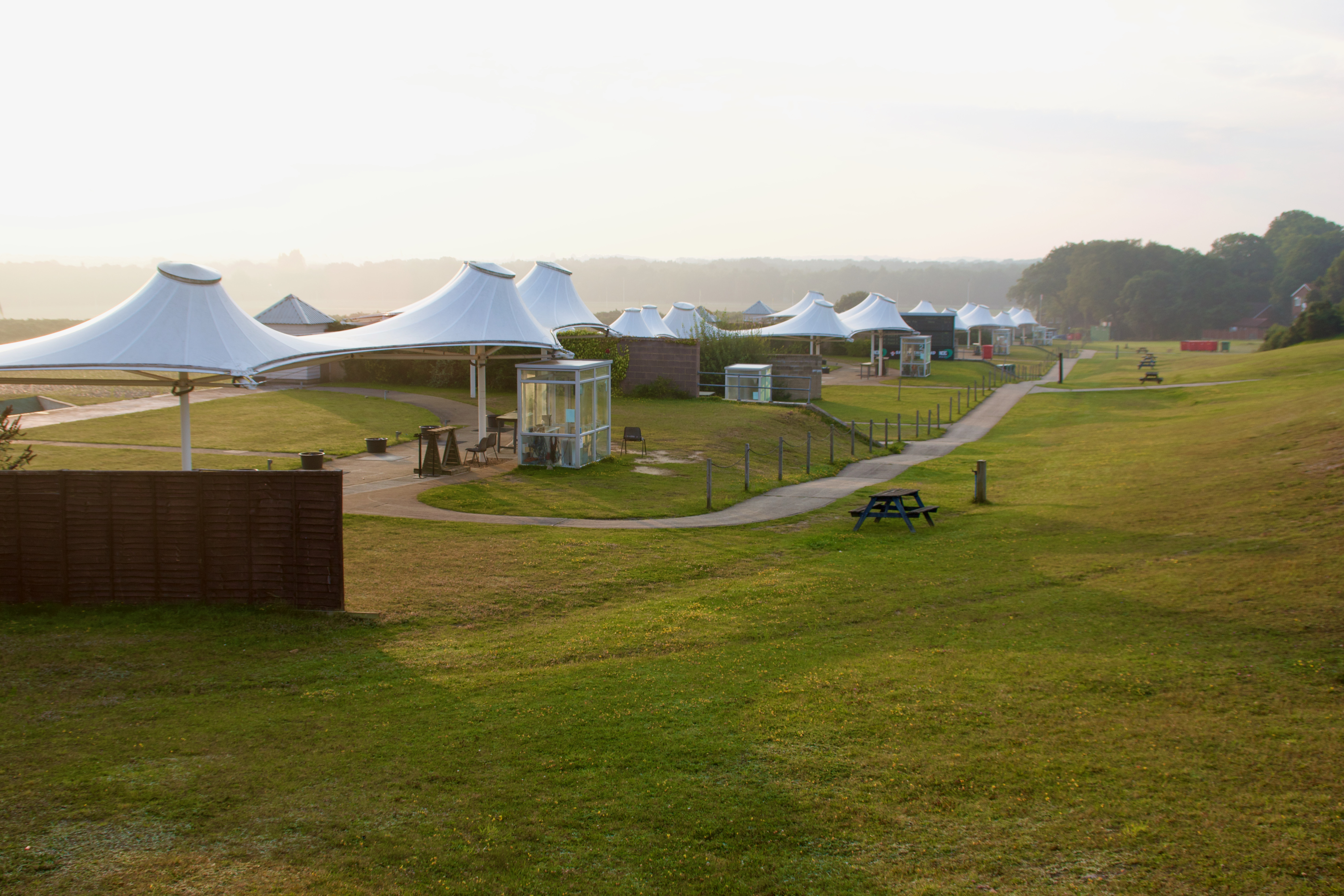
Clay shooting centre

== Medal table ==
* Host nation (England)

Medals won by nation with totals, ranked by number of golds—sortable
Rank	Nation	Gold	Silver	Bronze	Total
1	India	14	7	3	24
2	Australia	11	13	6	30
3	England*	5	5	8	18
4	Canada	4	3	4	11
5	Northern Ireland	2	0	0	2
6	New Zealand	1	1	4	6
7	Cyprus	1	0	1	2
7	Wales	1	0	1	2
9	Bangladesh	1	0	0	1
10	South Africa	0	6	5	11
11	Malaysia	0	2	2	4
12	Scotland	0	2	1	3
13	Pakistan	0	0	2	2
14	Malta	0	0	1	1
14	Namibia	0	0	1	1
Totals (15 entries)		40	39	39	118

== Medallists ==
=== Men ===
Event	Gold	Silver	Bronze
10m Air Pistol Individual	Mick Gault; England	Samaresh Jung; India	Jaspal Rana; India
10m Air Pistol pair	Nick Baxter & Mick Gault; England	Samaresh Jung & Jaspal Rana; India	André Malherbe & Friedhelm Sack; Namibia
10m Air Rifle Individual	Asif Hossain Khan; Bangladesh	Abhinav Bindra; India	Tim Lowndes; Australia
10m Air Rifle pair	Sameer Ambekar & Abhinav Bindra; India	Mohamed Hameley Mutalib & Mohammed Emran Zakaria; Malaysia	Chris Hector & Nigel Wallace; England
25 m Center-Fire Pistol Individual	Jaspal Rana; India	Bruce Quick; Australia	Irshad Ali; Pakistan
25 m Center-Fire Pistol pair	Jaspal Rana & Mahaveer Singh; India	David Moore & Bruce Quick; Australia	Irshad Ali & Zahid Ali; Pakistan
50m Free Pistol Individual	Mick Gault; England	Samaresh Jung; India	Daniel van Tonder; South Africa
50m Free Pistol pair	Samaresh Jung & Vivek Singh; India	David Moore & Bruce Quick; Australia	Daniel van Tonder & Frederick van Tonder; South Africa
Men's Olympic Trap Individual	Michael Diamond; Australia	Adam Vella; Australia	Anwer Sultan; India
Olympic Trap pair	Michael Diamond & Adam Vella; Australia	Christopher Dean & Ian Peel; England	James Birkett-Evans & Michael Wixey; Wales
Double Trap Individual	Rajyavardhan Singh Rathore; India	Russell Mark; Australia	William Chetcuti; Malta
Double Trap pair	Moraad Ali Khan & Rajyavardhan Singh Rathore; India	Michael Diamond & Russell Mark; Australia	John Bellamy & Richard Faulds; England
25 m Rapid Fire Pistol Individual	Metodi Igorov; Canada	Bruce Quick; Australia	Allan McDonald; South Africa
25 m Rapid Fire Pistol pair	Bhanwar Lal Dhaka & Mukesh Kumar; India	Allan McDonald & Frederick van Tonder; South Africa	Bruce Favell & Bruce Quick; Australia
25m Standard Pistol Individual	Jaspal Rana; India	Frederick van Tonder; South Africa	Mick Gault; England
25m Standard Pistol pair	Samaresh Jung & Jaspal Rana; India	Phil Adams & Bruce Quick; Australia	Daniel van Tonder & Frederick van Tonder; South Africa
Skeet Individual	Clayton Miller; Canada	Mike Thomson; Scotland	Antonis Nikolaidis; Cyprus
Skeet pair	Christos Kourtellas & Antonis Nicolaides; Cyprus	George Barton & David Cunningham; Australia	Richard Brickell & Drew Harvey; England
50m Rifle Three positions Individual	Charan Singh; India	Timothy Lowndes; Australia	Samuel Wieland; Australia
50m Rifle Three positions pair	Timothy Lowndes & Samuel Wieland; Australia	Jason Burrage & Chris Hector; England	Subbaiah Airira Pemmaiah & Charan Singh; India
50m Rifle Prone Individual	Timothy Lowndes; Australia	Michael Babb; England	Jaco Henn; South Africa
50m Rifle Prone pair	Michael Babb & Neil Day; England	Jaco Henn & Michael Thiele; South Africa	Mohd Sabki Mohd Din & Mohammed Emran Zakaria; Malaysia

=== Women ===
Event	Gold	Silver	Bronze
10m Air Pistol Individual	Lalita Yauhleuskaya; Australia	Dorothy Ludwig; Canada	Annemarie Forder; Australia
10m Air Pistol pair	Kim Eagles & Dorothy Ludwig; Canada	Shweta Chaudhary & Sheila Kanungo; India	Annemarie Forder & Lalita Yauhleuskaya; Australia
10m Air Rifle Individual	Anjali Bhagwat; India	Suma Shirur; India	Louise Minett; England
10m Air Rifle pair	Anjali Bhagwat & Suma Shirur; India	Sharon Bowes & Jacklyn Mecredy; Canada	Victoria Eaton & Louise Minett; England
Olympic Trap Individual	Cynthia Meyer; Canada	Anita North; England	Susan Nattrass; Canada
Olympic Trap pair	Nessa Jenkins & Diane Reeves; Australia	Lesley Goddard & Anita North; England	Cynthia Meyer & Susan Nattrass; Canada
Double Trap Individual	Charlotte Kerwood; England	Nadine Stanton; New Zealand	Cynthia Meyer; Canada
Double Trap pair	Teresa Borrell & Nadine Stanton; New Zealand	Cynthia Meyer & Susan Nattrass; Canada	Suzanne Balogh & Susan Trindall; Australia
Skeet Individual	Lauryn Ogilvie; Australia	Natalia Rahman; Australia	Edith Barnes; Scotland
Skeet pair	Lauryn Ogilvie & Natalia Rahman; Australia	Not awarded (only 3 entries)	
50m Rifle Prone Individual	Kim Frazer; Australia	Esmari van Reenen; South Africa	Juliet Etherington; New Zealand
50m Rifle Prone pair	Johanne Brekke & Ceri Dallimore; Wales	Susan Jackson & Sheena Sharp; Scotland	Linda Smallbone & Helen Vincent; England
50m Rifle Three positions Individual	Anjali Bhagwat; India	Raj Kumari; India	Roslina Bakar; Malaysia
50m Rifle Three positions pair	Anjali Bhagwat & Raj Kumari; India	Sue McCready & Susannah Smith; Australia	Sharon Bowes & Cari Johnson; Canada
25m Pistol Individual	Lalita Yauhleuskaya; Australia	Linda Ryan; Australia	Jocelyn Lees; New Zealand
25m Pistol pair	Linda Ryan & Lalita Yauhleuskaya; Australia	Irina Maharani & Bibiana Ng; Malaysia	Tania Corrigan & Jocelyn Lees; New Zealand

^{a} Due to the fact that there were only three pairs of competitors, only the gold medal was awarded.

=== Open ===
Event	Gold	Silver	Bronze
Fullbore Rifle Queens Prize – Open Pair	David Calvert & Martin Millar; Northern Ireland	Peter Bramley & David Dodds; South Africa	Glyn Barnett & Jane Messer; England
Fullbore Rifle Queens Prize	David Calvert; Northern Ireland	David Dodds; South Africa	Diane Collings; New Zealand

== See also ==
- List of Commonwealth Games medallists in shooting
