= Kharab =

Kharab may refer to:

- 10¹¹ in the Indian numbering system
- Kharab (toponymy), a component of some Arabic placenames meaning "ruined"
- Mamta Kharab, Indian women's hockey player
