= Hockey at the 2006 Commonwealth Games =

Field hockey at the 2006 Commonwealth Games
- Venue: State Netball and Hockey Centre
- Dates: 16 – 24 March 2006
- Nations: 10 (men); 10 (women)

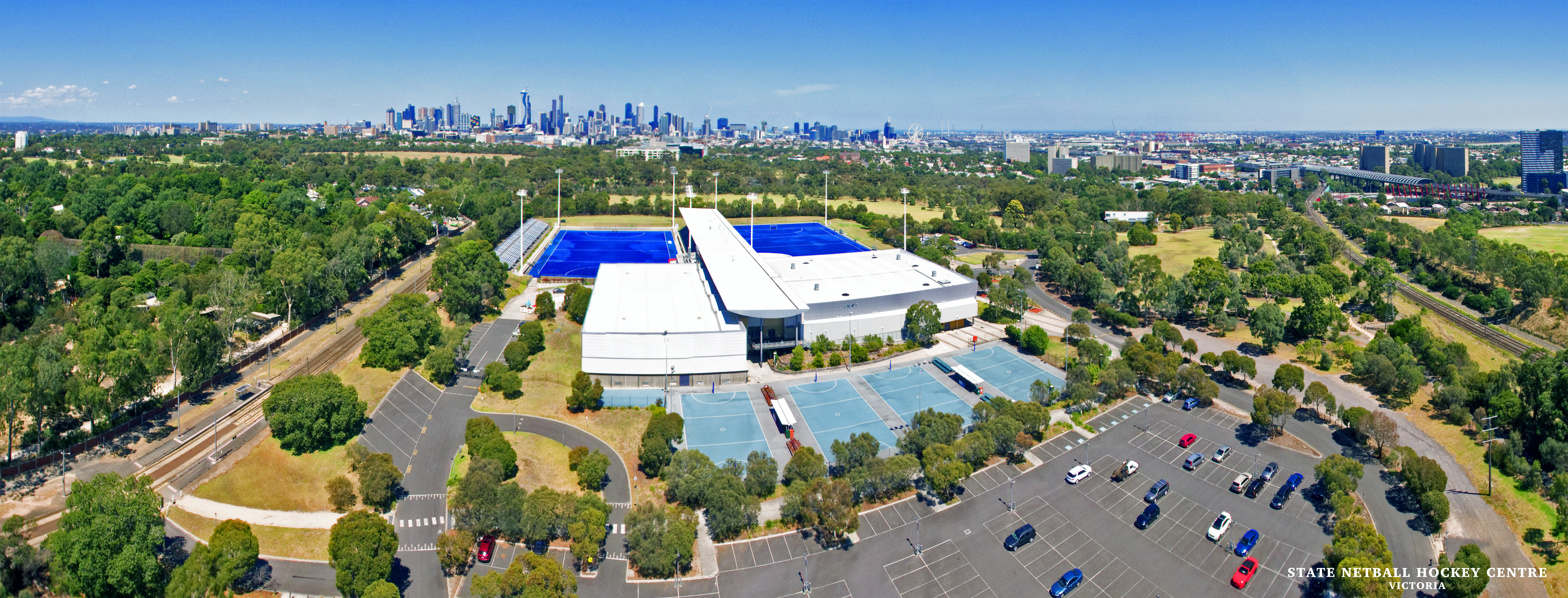
State Netball and Hockey Centre

Hockey at the 2006 Commonwealth Games was the third appearance of Hockey at the Commonwealth Games and took place between 16 March and 24 March for women and between 17 March and 24 March for men.

Both competitions consisted of a round robin stage of two groups of five with the winners and runners-up of each group qualifying for the semifinals.

All matches were played at the State Netball and Hockey Centre in the Parkville area of Melbourne.

Australia topped the field hockey medal table, by virtue of winning both gold medals.

== Medal table ==
* Host nation (Australia)

Rank	Nation	Gold	Silver	Bronze	Total
1	Australia*	2	0	0	2
2	India	0	1	0	1
2	Pakistan	0	1	0	1
4	England	0	0	1	1
4	Malaysia	0	0	1	1
Totals (5 entries)		2	2	2	6

== Men's tournament ==
=== Medallists ===
Event	Gold	Silver	Bronze
Men	Australia; Australia; Jamie Dwyer; Liam de Young; Michael McCann; Robert Hammond; Nathan Eglington; Mark Knowles; Luke Doerner; Grant Schubert; Bevan George; Stephen Lambert; Aaron Hopkins; Matthew Wells; Travis Brooks; Brent Livermore; Dean Butler; Stephen Mowlam; Coach: Barry Dancer	Pakistan; Pakistan; Salman Akbar; Imram Warsi; Muhammad Saqlain; Dilawar Hussain; Adnan Maqsood; Tariq Aziz; Rehan Butt; Muhammad Shabbir; Nasir Ahmed; Mudassar Ali Khan; Shakeel Abbasi; Imran Khan Yousafzai; Muhammad Zakir; Muhammad Imran; Zeeshan Ashraf; Muhammad Zubair; Coach: Asif Bajwa	Malaysia; Malaysia; Ibrahim Mohamed Nasihin; Rahim Muhamad Amin; Boon Huat Chua; Kali Logan Raj; Kuhan Shanmuganathan; Bakar Nor Azlan; Megat Termizi Megat Azrafiq; Mohan Jiwa; Nor Mohamed Madzli; Tengku Ahmad; Mat Radzi Mohamed Rodzhanizam; Kali Keevan Raj; Abu Ismail; Azlan Misron; Mohan Jivan; Kumar Subramaniam; Coach: Wallace Tan

== Women's tournament ==
=== Medallists ===
Event	Gold	Silver	Bronze
Women	Australia; Australia; Toni Cronk; Suzie Faulkner; Karen Smith; Kim Walker; Rebecca Sanders; Kate Hollywood; Emily Halliday; Madonna Blyth; Wendy Beattie; Nicole Arrold; Kobie McGurk; Rachel Imison; Angie Skirving; Melanie Twitt; Sarah Taylor; Nikki Hudson; Coach: Frank Murray	India; India; Helen Mary; Kanti Baa; Nilima Kujur; Rajwinder Kaur; Sumrai Tete; Masira Surin; Subhadra Pradhan; Asunta Lakra; Jyoti Sunita Kullu; Mamta Kharab; Jasjeet Kaur Handa; Surinder Kaur; Saba Anjum Karim; Sanggai Chanu; Sarita Lakra; Rajni Bala; Coach: Maharaj Krishan Kaushik	England; England; Carolyn Reid; Beth Storry; Lisa Wooding; Crista Cullen; Melanie Clewlow; Helen Grant; Helen Richardson; Lucilla Wright; Kate Walsh; Jennie Bimson; Alex Danson; Joanne Ellis; Cathy Gilliat-Smith; Charlotte Hartley; Rebecca Herbert; Chloe Rogers; Coach: Danny Kerry
