= Rajakumari =

Rajakumari may refer to:

- princely title for a daughter of a Raja or equivalent royal princess in India
- Rajakumari, Idukki district, a village in Kerala, India
- Raja Kumari (born 1986), Indian-American singer
- Rajakumari (1947 film), a 1947 Indian film
- Rajakumari (2009 film), a 2009 Indian film
- Rajakumari (TV series), a 2013 Indian TV series

== See also ==
- Rajkumari (disambiguation)
