= Mantu Ghosh =

Indian table tennis player

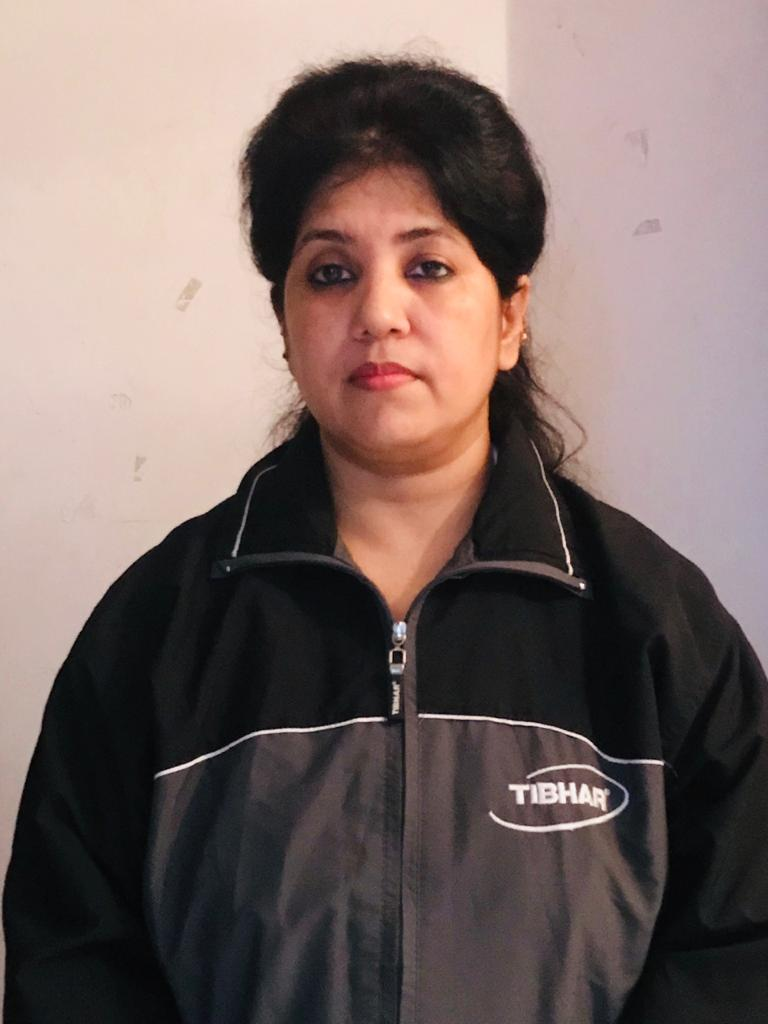
- Ghosh at YMA Club, Siliguri, in 2019
- Born: 1973/1974; Siliguri, West Bengal, India
- Occupations: Table tennis coach Sports administrator
- Known for: Two times national champion in table tennis
- Awards: Arjuna Award (2002); Banga Bhushan (2013)

Mantu Ghosh (born 1973/1974) is an Indian former table tennis player from West Bengal. As a two-time national champion, Ghosh is now the coach of India's table tennis women's team and a sports administrator after previously working in different capacities at the state and the national level. She was featured in the Limca Book of Records for becoming India's youngest national table tennis champion in 1990 at age 16. In 2002, her achievements were recognised by the Ministry of Youth Affairs and Sports and the Government of India, which awarded her the Arjuna Award.

== National career ==
Ghosh began training at Deshbandhu Sporting Union and won the 1988 Sub-Junior National Championship as a trainee at the club. She won the Junior National Table Tennis Championship in 1990, the same year she participated in the 52nd Senior National Table Tennis Championship held at Jaipur, Rajasthan. Winning the title, she became India's youngest national table tennis champion at age 16, an achievement that featured in the Limca Book of Records. Her victory at the national championship motivated more players in Siliguri to pursue table tennis. In 1993, she won the singles title at the 55th Senior National Table Tennis Championship.

=== International career ===
Ghosh competed in all events of table tennis at the 2002 Commonwealth Games held in Manchester, England. She failed to advance beyond the first round of singles; reached the quarterfinals of doubles – paired with Indu Nagapattinam R. – and eventually ranked fifth; and reached the third round of mixed doubles, pairing with Subramaniam Raman, The Indian team – consisting of Ghosh, Mouma Das, Indu Nagapattinam R., Nandita Saha, and Poulomi Ghatak – finished sixth.

Ghosh qualified for the main draw of the 2003 World Table Tennis Championships held in Paris, France, participating the singles and doubles events. Malaysian paddler Yao Lin Jing defeated Ghosh in the first round of singles by 12–10, 11–6, 11–3, 11–5; the pair Mauma Das and Ghosh lost against the Singaporean pair of Xueling Zhang and Tan Paey Fern by 11–8, 7–11, 5–11, 2–11, 11–8, 7–11 in doubles.

=== Post-retirement ===
After retirement, Ghosh began to coach players and became a part of different organisations related to table tennis at the state and the national level. She is the Chief Coach at the Young Men's Association's table tennis coaching centre in Siliguri. She was the national coach for the women's team and prepared the team for the 2010 Commonwealth Games. She trained both Soumyajit Ghosh and Ankita Das, who qualified for the 2012 Summer Olympics in London in their respective categories.

In 2016, she was appointed as the vice-chairperson of the North Bengal Board for Development of Sports and Games by the Chief Minister of West Bengal, Mamata Banarjee. The board, with Bhaichung Bhutia as its chairman, is based at Kanchenjunga Stadium and is responsible for developing and promoting sports in the seven districts of North Bengal.

In 2017, she became a joint-secretary of the Table Tennis Federation of India. She is also joint secretary of the Bengal State Table Tennis Association and is a past president of the North Bengal Table Tennis Association.

== Awards and honours ==
In 2002, Ghosh received the Arjuna Award from the Ministry of Youth Affairs and Sports and the Government of India in recognition of her achievements. On 20 May 2013, she received the Banga Bhushan title, a civil honour of the West Bengal state, from the Governor of West Bengal, M. K. Narayanan.

== Personal life ==
Ghosh is from Siliguri, West Bengal. She is married to Subrata Roy, a table tennis coach.
