= Lim Ju-young =

South Korean hockey player

Personal information
- Nationality: South Korean
- Born: 26 January 1980 (age 46)

Sport
- Sport: Field hockey
Medal record
Women's field hockey
Representing South Korea
Asian Games
Silver medal – second place	2002 Busan	Team

Lim Ju-young (born 26 January 1980) is a South Korean former field hockey player. She competed in the women's tournament at the 2004 Summer Olympics, and plays goalkeeper.
