= Lee Mi-seong =

South Korean hockey player

Personal information
- Nationality: South Korean
- Born: 18 November 1976 (age 49)

Sport
- Sport: Field hockey
Medal record
Women's field hockey
Representing South Korea
Asian Games
Silver medal – second place	2002 Busan	Team

Lee Mi-seong (born 18 November 1976) is a South Korean former field hockey player. She competed in the women's tournament at the 2004 Summer Olympics.
