= Pritam Rani Siwach =

Indian field hockey player

Personal information
- Born: 2 October 1974 (age 51) Jharsa, Gurgaon, India
Medal record
Women's field hockey
Representing India
Asian Games
Silver medal – second place	1998 Bangkok	Team
Commonwealth Games
Gold medal – first place	2002 Manchester	Team
Asia Cup
Silver medal – second place	1999 New Delhi
Champions Challenge
Bronze medal – third place	2002 Johannesburg	Team

Pritam Rani Siwach (born 2 October 1974) is an Indian former field hockey player, who represented the India women's national field hockey team. She also served as the captain of the Indian women's hockey team. In 2008, she was recalled to join the team for the Olympic qualifiers in order to bring an "additional wealth of experience." After the team did not qualify for the Olympics, Siwach stated in an interview, "We are not that bad as the results would show. It was simply a case of missed chances [...] One difference between my times and now is the midfield. We had an experienced midfield with Sita Gussain at the centre. That helped us. Here, both T. H. Ranjita and Rosalind Ralte are young, just come into the team. They are potential youngsters, will only improve."

She last played with the team when it won the Gold at the 2002 Commonwealth Games. She currently runs a hockey academy at Sonipat, Haryana and is training young girls in hockey. She is also trained as a hockey coach.

Siwach

== Career ==
Pritam was born in village Jharsa, near Gurgaon, Haryana, and started playing hockey at the age of 9. She had developed her hockey in the guidance of PTI Master Tara Chand in the school of Jharsa. Master Tara Chand and Head master Raghwendra Singh Yadav has helped her to become a best player of Hockey.

Pritam Rani Siwach is now Coach with Indian Women Hockey team for World Cup and Commonwealth Games.

== Awards ==
Pritham received an Arjuna Award in 1998 and the Dronacharya Award in 2021.
