= Tracey Larson =

American field hockey player

Tracey Larson (born May 1, 1978, in Lower Bucks, Pennsylvania) is a field hockey player from the United States, who made her international senior debut for the Women's National Team in 1999. Playing as a midfielder, the former student of the Penn State University was a member of the team, that won the silver medal at the 2003 Pan American Games in Santo Domingo, Dominican Republic.

== International senior tournaments ==
- 2000 – Olympic Qualifying Tournament, Milton Keynes, England (6th)
- 2001 – Americas Cup, Kingston, Jamaica (2nd)
- 2002 – Champions Challenge, Johannesburg, South Africa (5th)
- 2002 – 10th World Cup, Perth, Australia (9th)
- 2003 – Champions Challenge, Catania, Italy (5th)
- 2003 – Pan American Games, Santo Domingo, Dominican Republic (2nd)
- 2004 – Pan American Cup, Bridgetown, Barbados (2nd)
- 2004 – Olympic Qualifying Tournament, Auckland, New Zealand (6th)
