= Neelam Setti Laxmi =

Indian weightlifter (born 1973)

Personal information
- Full name: Neelam Setti Laxmi
- Born: 5 March 1973 (age 53)
- Weight: 68.09 kg (150.1 lb)

Sport
- Country: India
- Sport: Weightlifting
- Weight class: 69 kg
- Team: National team
- Updated on 28 September 2016

Neelam Setti Laxmi (born 5 March 1973) is an Indian female weightlifter, who has competed in the 69 kg category and represented India at international competitions. She competed at world championships, most recently at the 1999 World Weightlifting Championships. She won two silver medals at the 2002 Commonwealth Games.

== Major results ==
Year	Venue	Weight	Snatch (kg)				Clean & Jerk (kg)				Total	Rank
Year	Venue	Weight	1	2	3	Rank	1	2	3	Rank	Total	Rank
World Championships
1999	Piraeus, Greece	69 kg	100	~~105~~	~~105~~	7	~~125~~	~~125~~	~~125~~	---	0	---
