= Raj Kumari (sport shooter) =

Indian shooter

Personal information
- National team: India
- Employer: Indian Army
Medal record
Women's shooting
Representing India
Commonwealth Games
Gold medal – first place	2002 Manchester	Women's 50m Rifle Three positions Pairs
Silver medal – second place	2002 Manchester	Women's 50m Rifle Three positions Individual

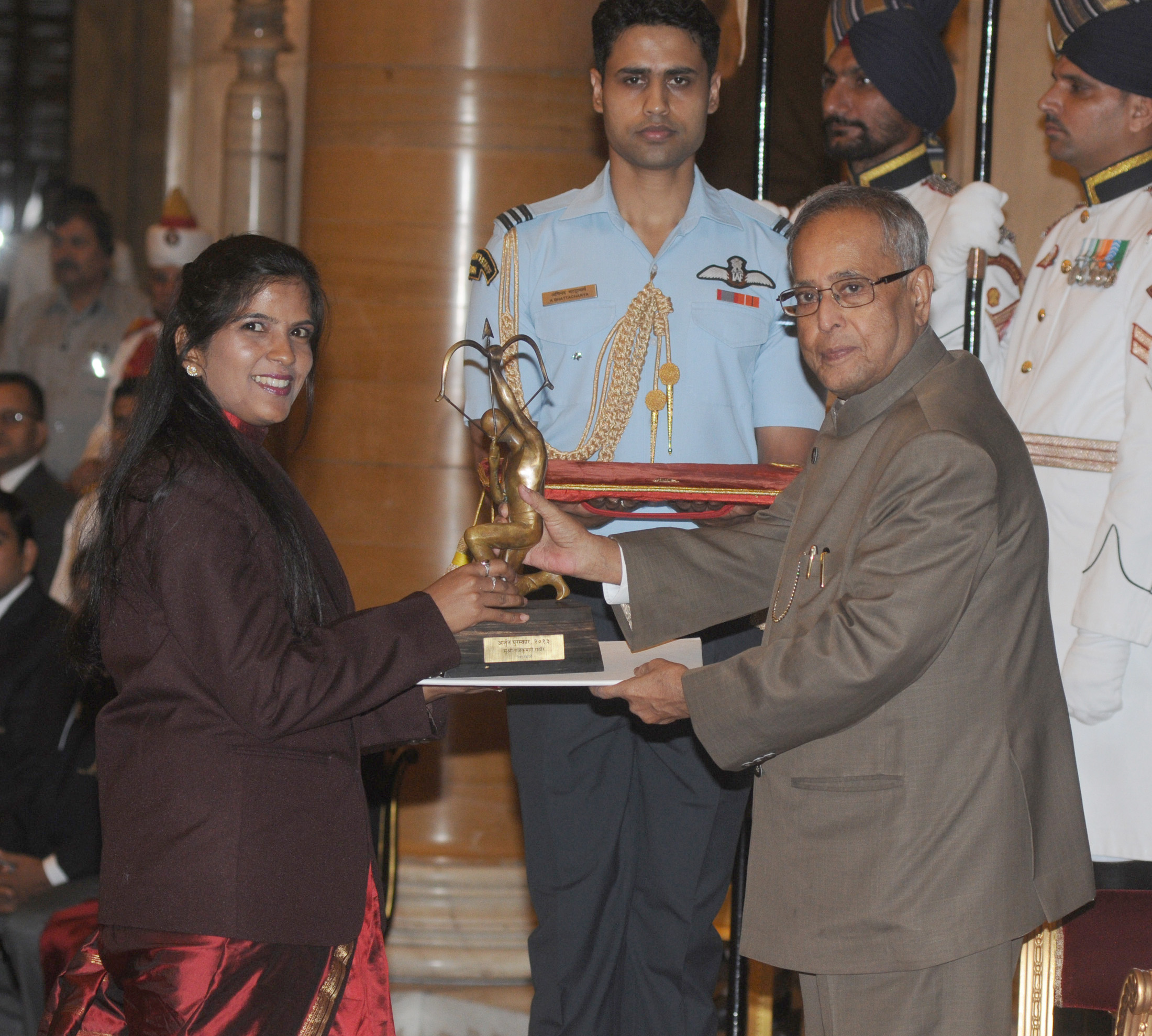
Rathore receiving the Arjuna Award from the President of India Pranab Mukherjee.

Rajkumari Rathore, née Raj Kumari, is an Indian shooter. In 2013, she was awarded the Arjuna Award.

== Career ==
She started shooting in 1995, and joined the Army team.

In the 2002 Commonwealth Games, she won a gold medal. In the Women's 50m Rifle Three positions Individual, she won a silver medal.

In the 2002 Asian Games, she was part of the Indian team that competed in the women's 50m rifle prone event, which finished seventh.

In 2011, she won a gold medal in the 54th National shooting championship.

In the 2012 Asian Shooting Championships, she won a gold medal in the women's 50 m rifle prone. In the same event, she missed an Olympic qualification in the women's rifle 3-position by one point, scoring 578 points to finish in the 9th place.

== Personal life ==
She married Deepak Rathore in 2007, and has a daughter.
