= Bhanwar Lal Dhaka =

Indian sport shooter

Personal information
- Nationality: Indian
- Born: 15 July 1965
- Died: March 13, 2012 (aged 46) Jodhpur, Rajasthan, India
- Employer: Indian Army

Sport
- Sport: Shooting
- Event: Pistol shooting
Medal record
Men's shooting
Representing India
Event / 1st / 2nd / 3rd; Commonwealth Games / 1 / 0 / 1
Commonwealth Games
Gold medal – first place	2002 Manchester	25 m rapid-fire pistol – pairs
Bronze medal – third place	1998 Kuala Lumpur	25 m rapid-fire pistol

Bhanwar Lal Dhaka (15 July 1965–13 March 2012) was an Indian sport shooter who competed in pistol shooting. He was part of the Indian Army. He won the gold medal in the men's 25 m rapid-fire pistol pairs event at the 2002 Commonwealth Games and the bronze medal in the men's 25 m rapid-fire pistol at the 1998 Commonwealth Games.

== Biography ==
Bhanwar Lal Dhaka was born on 15 July 1965.

In the 1998 Commonwealth Games in Kuala Lumpur, he won the bronze medal in the men's 25 m rapid-fire pistol. He scored 668.9 points to finish behind Metodi Igorov of Canada and Allan McDonald of South Africa. In the 1998 ISSF World Cup in Atlanta, he finished 15th in the 25 m rapid fire pistol event with a score of 575 points. At the 2002 Commonwealth Games in Manchester, Dhaka partnered Mukesh Kumar in the men's 25 m rapid-fire pistol – pairs event. The Indian pair won the gold medal with a score of 1141 points.

Dhaka was awarded the Maharana Pratap Award by the Rajasthan State Sports Council in 2002.

Dhaka died at the age of 47 in Jodhpur, Rajasthan, on 13 March 2012, following a heart attack.
