= Rajkumari =

Rajkumari or Raj Kumari may refer to:

== Title ==
- princely title for a daughter of a Raja or equivalent royal princess in Southern Asia

== People ==
- Rajkumari Singh (disambiguation), people known by the name Rajkumari Singh
- Rajkumari Dubey (1924–2000), Indian playback singer in Hindi cinema of the 1930s and 40s
- Rajkumari Kaul (1928–2014), Indian intellectual
- Rajkumari Amrit Kaur (1887–1964), Indian activist and politician
- Rajkumari Banerji (1847–1876), Indian social worker and Bengali philanthropist
- Rajkumari Devi known also as Kisan Chachi, Indian farmer
- Rajkumari Surajkala, Indian politician from Madhya Pradesh
- Raj Kumari Pandey (born 1969), Nepalese long-distance runner
- Raj Kumari Chauhan, Indian politician from Uttar Pradesh
- Raj Kumari Dhillon, Indian politician from Delhi
- Raj Kumari Thapa, Indian politician from Sikkim

== Other uses ==
- Rajkumari (1970 film), an Indian Bengali-language masala film
- Rajkumari (2009 film), an Indian Kannada language drama film

== See also ==
- Rajakumari (disambiguation)
- Raja Kumari, singer
