= Jenny Johnson (field hockey) =

Canadian field hockey player

Personal information
- Born: Jenny Zinkan-McGrade; January 9, 1979 Duncan, British Columbia
- Height: 162 cm (5 ft 4 in)
- Weight: 54 kg (119 lb)

Sport
- Club: Cowichan Ladies F.H.A.
Medal record
Field hockey
Pan American Games
Bronze medal – third place	1999 Winnipeg	Women's team

Jenny Johnson (née Zinkan-McGrade; born January 9, 1979) is a former field hockey midfielder from Canada. She earned a total number of 85 international caps for the Canadian Women's National Team during her career. In 1997, Johnson was named in the British Columbia Sport Hall of Fame as the Female High School Athlete of the Year.

== International senior tournaments ==
- 1998 – Commonwealth Games, Kuala Lumpur, Malaysia (not ranked)
- 1999 – Pan American Games, Winnipeg, Canada (3rd)
- 2001 – Pan American Cup, Kingston, Jamaica (3rd)
- 2001 – World Cup Qualifier, Amiens/Abbeville, France (10th)
- 2002 – Commonwealth Games, Manchester, England (7th)
