= Jyoti Sunita Kullu =

Indian field hockey player

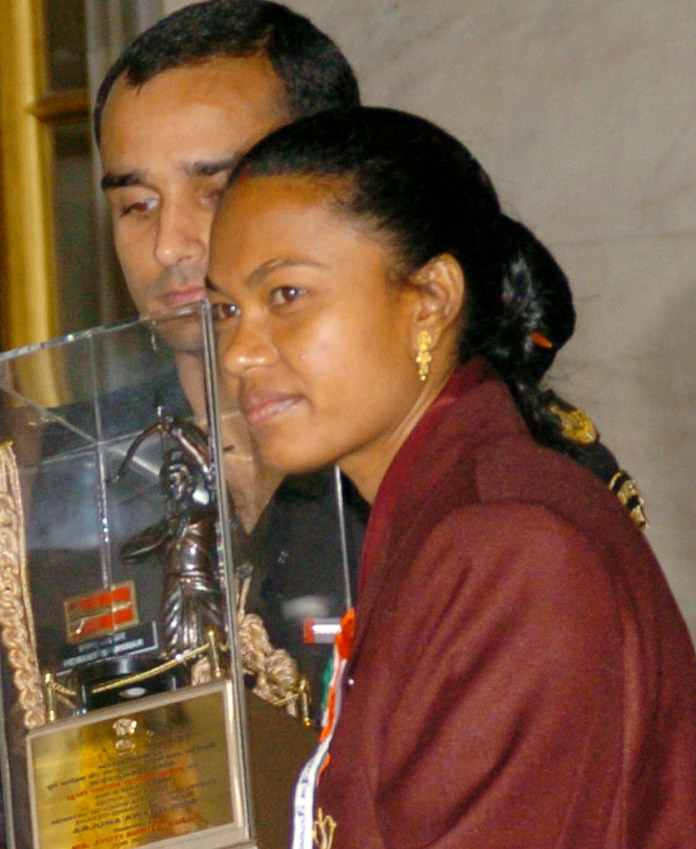
- Kullu receiving the Arjuna Award in 2007

Personal information
- Born: 9 September 1978 (age 47) Sundargarh, Odisha
Medal record
Women's field hockey
Representing India
Commonwealth Games
Gold medal – first place	2002 Manchester	Team
Silver medal – second place	2006 Melbourne	Team
Asia Cup
Gold medal – first place	2004 New Delhi
Silver medal – second place	1999 New Delhi
Asian Games
Silver medal – second place	1998 Bangkok	Team
Bronze medal – third place	2006 Doha	Team
Champions Challenge
Bronze medal – third place	2002 Johannesburg	Team

Jyoti Sunita Kullu (born 9 September 1978 in Sundargarh, Odisha) is an Indian former field hockey player, who represented the India women's national field hockey team. She made her international debut for India in 1996 in Delhi at the Indira Gandhi Gold Cup. In 2002, she became the top scorer of the Champions Challenge tournament in Johannesburg, South Africa, with five goals in six matches. In the same year Kullu won the gold medal with India at the 2002 Commonwealth Games in Manchester, England.

== International senior tournaments ==
- 1996 – Indira Gandhi Gold Cup, New Delhi
- 1997 – World Cup Qualifier, Harare (4th)
- 1998 – World Cup, Utrecht (12th)
- 1998 – Commonwealth Games, Kuala Lumpur (4th)
- 1998 – Asian Games, Bangkok (2nd)
- 1999 – Hockey Asia Cup, New Delhi (2nd)
- 2000 – Olympic Qualifier, Milton Keynes (10th)
- 2001 – World Cup Qualifier, Amiens/Abbeville (7th)
- 2002 – Champions Challenge, Johannesburg (3rd)
- 2002 – Commonwealth Games, Manchester (1st)
- 2002 – Asian Games, Busan (4th)
- 2003 – Afro-Asian Games, Hyderabad (1st)
- 2004 – Hockey Asia Cup, New Delhi (1st)
- 2006 – Commonwealth Games, Melbourne (2nd)
- 2006 – World Cup, Madrid (11th)

== Awards ==
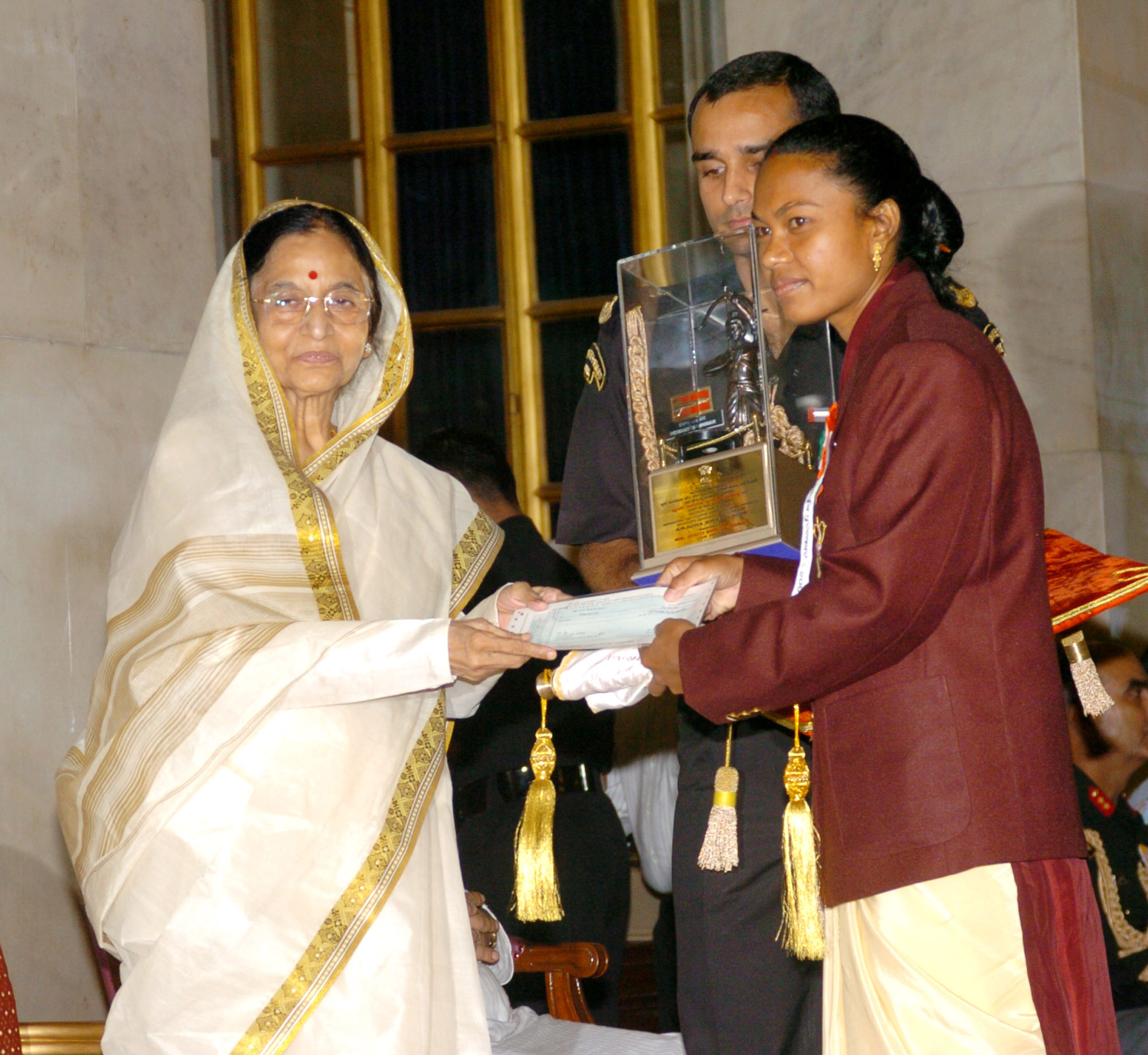
The President, Smt. Pratibha Patil presenting the Arjuna Award -2006 to Ms. Jyoti Sunita Kullu for Hockey (Women) at a glittering function, in New Delhi on August 29, 2007

- Arjuna Award, 2007
