= Deb Cuthbert =

Canadian field hockey player

Deb Cuthbert (born December 5, 1977, in Edinburgh, Scotland) is a former field hockey player from Canada.

Cuthbert earned a total number of more than fifty international caps for the Canadian National Team during her career.

== International senior tournaments ==
- 2001 – Americas Cup, Kingston, Jamaica (3rd)
- 2001 – World Cup Qualifier, Amiens/Abbeville, France (10th)
- 2002 – Commonwealth Games, Manchester (7th)
- 2006 – Commonwealth Games, Melbourne (8th)
