= Masira Surin =

Indian field hockey player

Personal information
- Born: 18 November 1981 (age 44) Simdega district, Jharkhand, India
Medal record
Women's field hockey
Representing India
Commonwealth Games
Gold medal – first place	2002 Manchester	Team
Silver medal – second place	2006 Melbourne	Team
Asia Cup
Gold medal – first place	2004 New Delhi
Champions Challenge
Bronze medal – third place	2002 Johannesburg	Team

Masira Surin (born 18 November 1981) is a member of the India women's national field hockey team. She played with the team when it won the gold at the Manchester 2002 Commonwealth Games.
