= Emma Rochlin =

Scottish field hockey player

Emma Rochlin (born 14 May 1978 in Glasgow) is a female field hockey defender from Scotland. She plays club hockey for Glasgow Western, and made her debut for the Women's National Team in 1999. Rochlin works as a trainee solicitor.
