= Sheila Kanungo =

Indian sport shooter

Sport
- Country: India
- Sport: Sports shooting
Medal record
Women's shooting
Representing India
Commonwealth Games
Silver medal – second place	2002 Manchester	Women's Air Pistol Pairs

Sheila Kanungo is an Indian sport shooter. She won a silver medal in 2002 Commonwealth Games in Air Pistol Pairs.
