= Nandita Saha =

Indian table tennis player

Personal information
- Born: Siliguri, India

Sport
- Sport: Table tennis
Medal record
Women's table tennis
Representing India
Commonwealth Games
Bronze medal – third place	2006 Melbourne	Women's team

Nandita Saha is an Indian table tennis player. She was a part of Indian trio who defeated Canada in Common wealth 2006 at Melbourne and won Bronze medal for India. She won Bronze Medal in Women's singles in Senior National TT Championship in 2010. Twice a Gold medal winner in Mixed Doubles in the National Championship. Represented India in various World Championships, Asian Championships, Commonwealth Championships, and SAF Games. She also represented India in the Manchester Commonwealth Games in 2002. Currently working at Oil India Limited.
