= Carina van Zyl =

South African field hockey player

Carina van Zijl (born 20 May 1975) is a South African former field hockey player who competed in the 2000 Summer Olympics.
