= Nina Bonner =

Australian field hockey player

Personal information
- Born: 25 March 1972 (age 54)
Medal record
Women's field hockey
Representing Australia
Commonwealth Games
Bronze medal – third place	2002 Manchester	Team competition

Nina Bonner (born 25 March 1972 in New South Wales) is a retired female field hockey goalkeeper from Australia. She made her debut for the Australian women's national team during the 1996 season (Indira Gandhi Cup). Nicknamed Boona she was a member of the Hockeyroos at the 2002 Commonwealth Games in Manchester, where the team ended up in third place in the overall-rankings.
