= Helen Mary =

Indian field hockey player

Personal information
- Born: Helen Mary Innocent; 14 March 1977 (age 49) Kerala, India

Sport
- Sport: Field hockey
- Position: Goalkeeper
Senior career
| Years | Team | Caps | Goals |
| – | Indian Railways | - | - |
National team
| Years | Team | Caps | Goals |
| 1992-2006 | India | | - |
Medal record
Women's field hockey
Representing India
Asian Games
| Silver medal – second place | 1998 Bangkok | Team |
Commonwealth Games
| Gold medal – first place | 2002 Manchester | Team |
| Silver medal – second place | 2006 Melbourne | Team |
Asia Cup
| Gold medal – first place | 2004 New Delhi |
| Silver medal – second place | 1999 New Delhi |
Afro-Asian Games
| Gold medal – first place | 2003 Hyderabad | Team |
Champions Challenge
| Bronze medal – third place | 2002 Johannesburg | Team |

Helen Mary Innocent (born 14 March 1977 in Kerala) is an Indian former field hockey player who played for India as goalkeeper. She made her international debut for India in 1992 in the test series against Germany. In 2003, she saved two penalty strokes in final tie-breaker to win title for India at the Afro-Asian Games in Hyderabad. She also earned the Arjuna Award.

== International senior tournaments ==
- 1996 – Indira Gandhi Gold Cup, New Delhi
- 1997 – World Cup Qualifier, Harare (4th)
- 1998 – World Cup, Utrecht (12th)
- 1998 – Commonwealth Games, Kuala Lumpur (4th)
- 1998 – Asian Games, Bangkok (2nd)
- 1999 – Asia Cup, New Delhi (2nd)
- 2000 – Olympic Qualifier, Milton Keynes (10th)
- 2001 – World Cup Qualifier, Amiens/Abbeville (7th)
- 2002 – Champions Challenge, Johannesburg (3rd)
- 2002 – Commonwealth Games, Manchester (1st)
- 2002 – Asian Games, Busan (4th)
- 2003 – Afro-Asian Games, Hyderabad (1st)
- 2004 – Asia Cup, New Delhi (1st)
- 2006 – Commonwealth Games, Melbourne (2nd)
- 2006 – World Cup, Madrid (11th)
