= 1999 Women's Hockey Asia Cup =

International field hockey tournament

Tournament details
- Host country: India
- City: New Delhi
- Dates: 1–10 December
- Teams: 6 (from 1 confederation)
- Venue: Dhyan Chand National Stadium

Final positions
- Champions: South Korea (3rd title)
- Runner-up: India
- Third place: China

Tournament statistics
- Matches played: 18
- Goals scored: 79 (4.39 per match)

The 1999 Women's Hockey Asia Cup was the fourth edition of the Women's Hockey Asia Cup. It was held in New Delhi, India from 1 December to 10 December 1999.

South Korea won the title, with India finishing second while China took the third place.

== Teams ==
- China
- India
- Japan
- Kazakhstan
- Malaysia
- South Korea

== Results ==
=== Table ===
Pos	Team	Pld	W	D	L	GF	GA	GD	Pts	Qualification
1	India (H)	5	3	2	0	22	4	+18	8	Advanced to Finals
2	South Korea	5	3	1	1	22	6	+16	7	Advanced to Finals
3	China	5	2	3	0	7	1	+6	7	
4	Japan	5	2	2	1	8	6	+2	6	
5	Kazakhstan	5	1	0	4	4	28	−24	2	
6	Malaysia	5	0	0	5	3	21	−18	0	

Source: Todor66
Rules for classification: 1) points; 2) goal difference; 3) goals scored; 4) head-to-head result.
(H) Hosts

=== Matches ===
1 December 1999
11:00

South Korea	4–1	Japan

1 December 1999
15:00

India	8–0	Malaysia
Pritam Rani Siwach ?', ?', ?'; Suraj Lata Devi ?', ?'; Jyoti Sunita Kullu ?', ?'; Manjinder Kaur ?'	Report

2 December 1999
13:00

India	9–0	Kazakhstan
Pritam Rani Siwach ?', ?'; Suraj Lata Devi ?', ?'; Sita Gussain ?', ?'; Manjinder Kaur ?', ?'; Jyoti Sunita Kullu ?'	Report

2 December 1999
15:00

South Korea	1–1	China

3 December 1999
13:00

Kazakhstan	4–2	Malaysia

3 December 1999
15:00

China	0–0	Japan

4 December 1999
13:00

South Korea	5–1	Malaysia

4 December 1999
15:00

India	2–2	Japan
Sita Gussain ?'; Pritam Rani Siwach ?'	Report

5 December 1999
13:00

South Korea	10–0	Kazakhstan

5 December 1999
15:00

India	0–0	China
	Report

6 December 1999
13:00

Japan	2–0	Kazakhstan

6 December 1999
15:00

China	11–0	Malaysia

7 December 1999
13:00

Japan	3–0	Malaysia

7 December 1999
15:00

India	3–2	South Korea
Pritam Rani Siwach ?', ?'; Sumrai Tete ?'	Report	Woo Hyun-jung ?', ?'

8 December 1999
13:00

China	5–0	Kazakhstan

=== First to sixth place classification ===
==== Fifth place game ====
9 December 1999
13:00

Kazakhstan	4–3	Malaysia
Yelena Apeiganetz ?'; Yelena Svirskaya ?'; Natalya Podshivalova ?', ?'		Yuwana Rahman ?'; Che Ibrahim ?'; Soobni Ahmad ?'

==== Third place game ====
9 December 1999
15:00

China	1–0	Japan
Yang Huiping ?'

==== Final ====
10 December 1999
14:00

South Korea	3–2	India
Kim Eun-jin ?'; Lee Eun-young 68', 74'	Report	Suraj Lata Devi 36'; Kamla Dalal 66'

== Winners ==
1999 Women's Hockey Asia Cup winners

South Korea
Third title

== Final standings ==
Rank	Team
1st place, gold medalist(s)	South Korea
2nd place, silver medalist(s)	India
3rd place, bronze medalist(s)	China
4	Japan
5	Kazakhstan
6	Malaysia

Team qualified for the 2002 World Cup
