= Leisa King =

English field hockey player

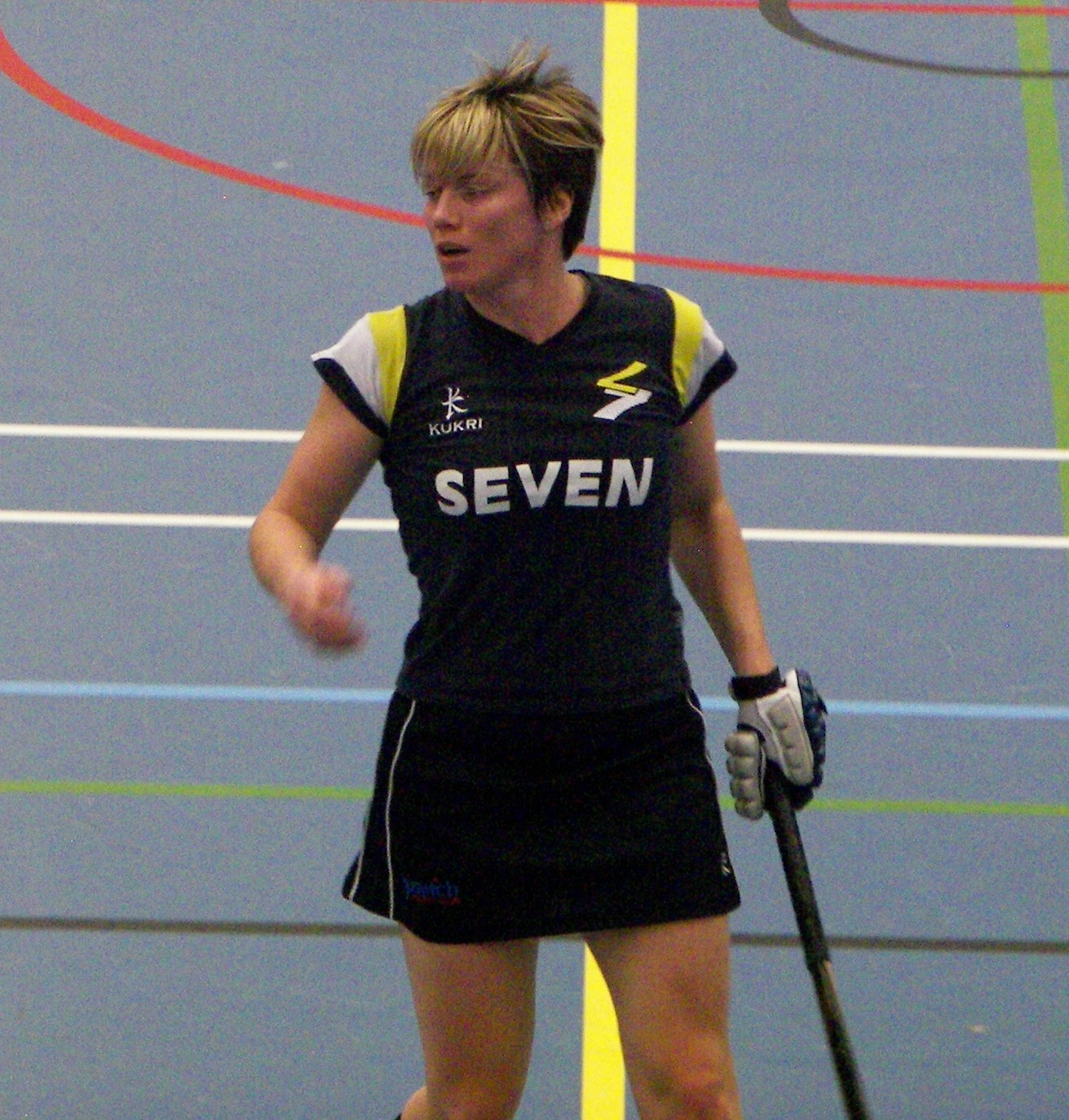
Leisa King

Leisa King is a former field hockey player from England.

She has scored 44 goals for England, won silver at the 2002 Commonwealth Games in Manchester and bronze at the 2005 European Nations Cup. She won 125 combined caps from 1997 to 2005.

She retired in October 2005.
