= Susan Wessels-Webber =

South African field hockey player

Personal information
- Born: 12 November 1977 (age 48)
Medal record
Women's field hockey
Representing South Africa
All-Africa Games
| Gold medal – first place | 2003 Abuja | Team competition |
Afro-Asian Games
| Silver medal – second place | 2003 Hyderabad | Team competition |

Susan Wessels-Webber (born 12 November 1977 in Bloemfontein, Free State) is a field hockey player from South Africa who represented her country at the 2000 and 2004 Summer Olympics. She captained the women's national team at the 2003 All-Africa Games in Abuja, Nigeria, where South Africa won the title by defeating Nigeria 10–0.
