= Amandeep Kaur =

Indian field hockey player

Personal information
- Born: January 1, 1976 (age 50) Punjab, India
Medal record
Women's field hockey
Representing India
Asian Games
Silver medal – second place	1998 Bangkok	Team
Commonwealth Games
Gold medal – first place	2002 Manchester	Team
Asia Cup
Silver medal – second place	1999 New Delhi
Champions Challenge
Bronze medal – third place	2002 Johannesburg	Team

Amandeep Kaur (born January 1, 1976) is an Indian former field hockey player, who represented the India women's national field hockey team. She played with the team when it won the Gold at the 2002 Commonwealth Games.
