= Tingongleima Chanu =

Indian field hockey player

Personal information
- Full name: Tingongleima Chanu Kshetrimayum
- Born: 1 April 1976 (age 50) Manipur, India
Medal record
Women's field hockey
Representing India
Asian Games
Silver medal – second place	1998 Bangkok	Team
Commonwealth Games
Gold medal – first place	2002 Manchester	Team
Asia Cup
Silver medal – second place	1999 New Delhi
Champions Challenge
Bronze medal – third place	2002 Johannesburg	Team

Tingongleima Chanu Kshetrimayum (born 1 April 1976), shortly known as Tingu, and also by a misnomer Tingonleima Chanu, is an Indian former field hockey player. She was a member of the India women's national field hockey team. She hails from Manipur.

== Early life ==
Tingu was born to Kshetrimayum Tomba and Mema Devi. They hail from Sagolband Moirang Hanuba Leirak. She studied at Modern Higher Secondary School, Sagolband. She married Brajamani Singh of Sagolband Khamnam Leirak. Her first coach in the Manipur SAI Sports Hostel was Yaima.

== Hockey career ==
She played for India 1994 to 2002. She was part of the team that won the Gold at the Manchester 2002 Commonwealth Games and the silver medal-winning Asian Games team in 1998. She earned the Arjuna Award in 2000. She also played the FIH Women's World Cup at Utrecht in the Netherlands in 1998. She was the captain of the Indian team that played the Olympic qualifiers at Milton Keynes in March 2000.
