= Sumrai Tete =

Indian field hockey player

Personal information
- Born: 15 November 1979 (age 46) Simdega, Jharkhand, India
Medal record
Women's field hockey
Representing India
Commonwealth Games
Gold medal – first place	2002 Manchester	Team
Silver medal – second place	2006 Melbourne	Team
Asia Cup
Gold medal – first place	2004 New Delhi
Silver medal – second place	1999 New Delhi
Champions Challenge
Bronze medal – third place	2002 Johannesburg	Team

Sumrai Tete (born 15 November 1979) is an Indian former field hockey player who played for the India women's field hockey team. She played with the team when it won the Gold at the Manchester 2002 Commonwealth Games.

In the year 2017, she was honoured with the prestigious Dhyan Chand Award by the Ministry of Youth Affairs and Sports for her achievements and contribution to Field hockey in India.

She is the brand ambassador of Hockey in her state Jharkhand. The Chief Minister Raghubar Das also announced that she will be training the State level hockey players.
