= Suman Bala (field hockey) =

Indian field hockey player

Medal record
Women's field hockey
Representing India
Commonwealth Games
Gold medal – first place	2002 Manchester	Team
Hockey Asia Cup
Gold medal – first place	2004 New Delhi
Asian Games
Bronze medal – third place	2006 Doha	Team
Champions Challenge
Bronze medal – third place	2002 Johannesburg	Team

Suman Bala (born 15 December 1981) is an Indian former field hockey player, who represented the India women's national field hockey team. She hails from Shahabad Markanda, Haryana, and played with the team when it won the Gold at the Manchester 2002 Commonwealth Games.
