= Surajlata Devi Waikhom =

Indian field hockey player

Surajlata Devi
Personal information
- Full name: Surajlata Devi Waikhom
- Born: 3 January 1981 (age 45) Manipur, India
Medal record
Women's field hockey
Representing India
Asian Games
Silver medal – second place	1998 Bangkok	Team
Commonwealth Games
Gold medal – first place	2002 Manchester	Team
Asia Cup
Gold medal – first place	2004 New Delhi
Silver medal – second place	1999 New Delhi
Champions Challenge
Bronze medal – third place	2002 Johannesburg	Team

Surajlata Devi Waikhom (Meitei: Waikhom Surajlata Devi, born 3 January 1981 in Manipur) is an Indian former field hockey player, who represented the India women's national field hockey team. She served as the captain of the India women's national field hockey team and hails from Manipur. She received the Arjuna Award in 2003.

She led the team to the Gold for three consecutive years: during the 2002 Commonwealth Games (the event which inspired the 2007 Bollywood hit film, Chak De India), the 2003 Afro-Asian Games, and the 2004 Hockey Asia Cup.
