= Melanie Clewlow =

British field hockey player

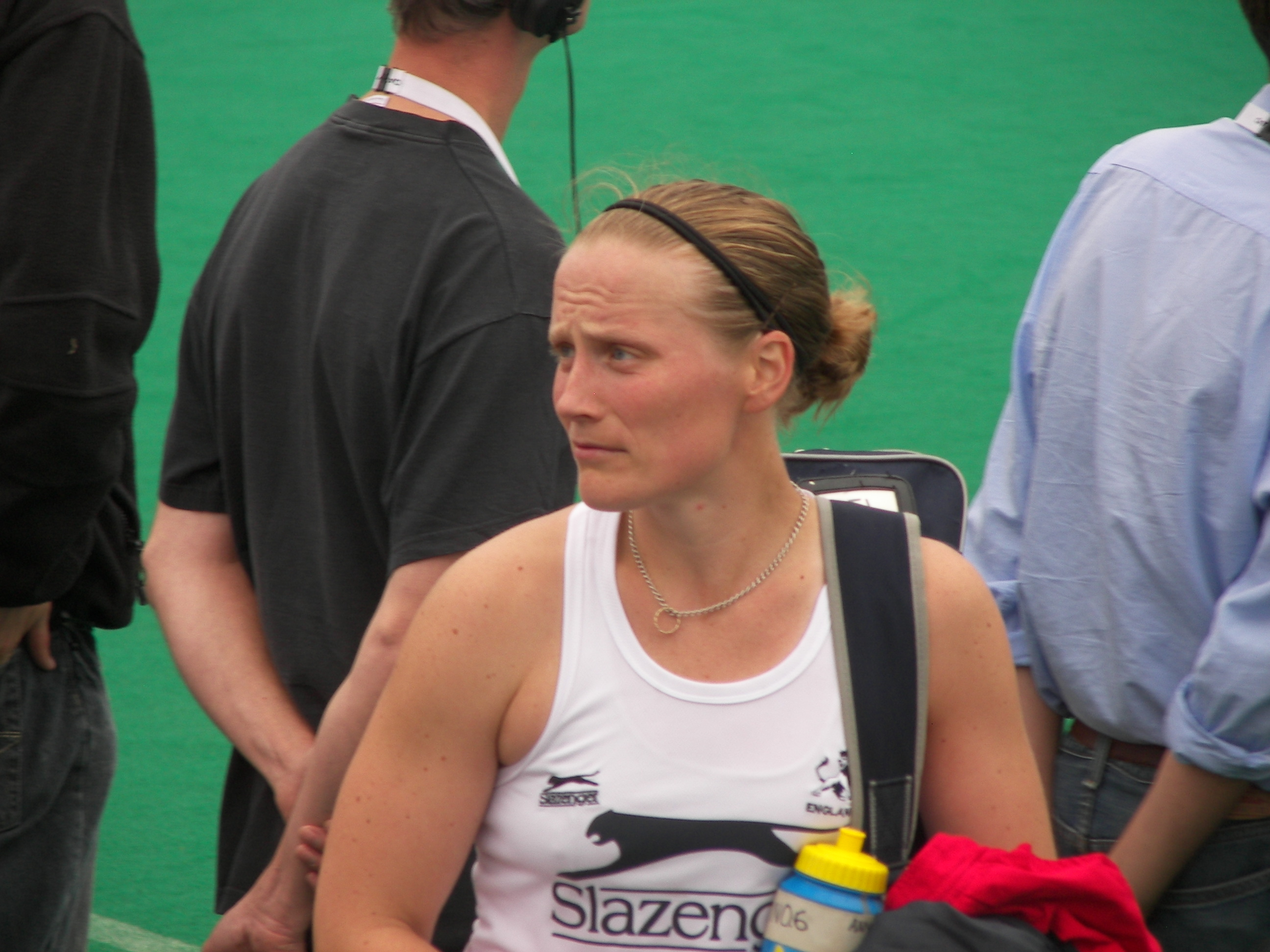

Personal information
- Born: 7 May 1976 (age 50) Dover, Kent, England
- Height: 1.71 m (5 ft 7 1/2 in)

Sport
- Country: United Kingdom England
- Sport: Hockey
Medal record
Women's field hockey
Representing England
European Championship
Bronze medal – third place	1999 Cologne	Team
Bronze medal – third place	2007 Manchester	Team
Commonwealth Games
Silver medal – second place	1998 Kuala Lumpur	Team
Bronze medal – third place	2006 Melbourne	Team
Champions Challenge
Gold medal – first place	2002 Johannesburg	Team

Melanie "Mel" Clewlow (born 7 May 1976 in Dover, Kent) is an English field hockey player.

She was a member of the England and Great Britain squads. She made her international debut in 1996, and was part of the England squad that won silver in the 1998 Commonwealth Games, as well as competing twice for Great Britain at the 2000 and 2008 Summer Olympics. Clewlow initially retired in 2005, but returned shortly after, and retired a second time after competing at the 2008 Summer Olympics.

She has played for Canterbury Hockey Club.
