= Kanti Baa =

Indian field hockey player

Medal record
Women's field hockey
Representing India
Commonwealth Games
Gold medal – first place	2002 Manchester	Team
Silver medal – second place	2006 Melbourne	Team
Asia Cup
Gold medal – first place	2004 New Delhi

Kanti Baa (born 15 November 1979) is a member of the Indian women's hockey team and played with the team when it won the Gold at the 2002 Commonwealth Games.

== Early life ==
Kaanti Baa was born on 15 November 1979 in Simdega district, Jharkhand. She attended school at Bariyatu Government Girls High.

== Career ==
She works for the Central Railway in Mumbai.

In her hockey career, she has competed in both domestic and international circuits. She made her first appearance at Australia 4 Nation Tournament in 1999. The most recent game played by Kanti was the Commonwealth in 2002.
