= Mamta Kharab =

Indian field hockey player

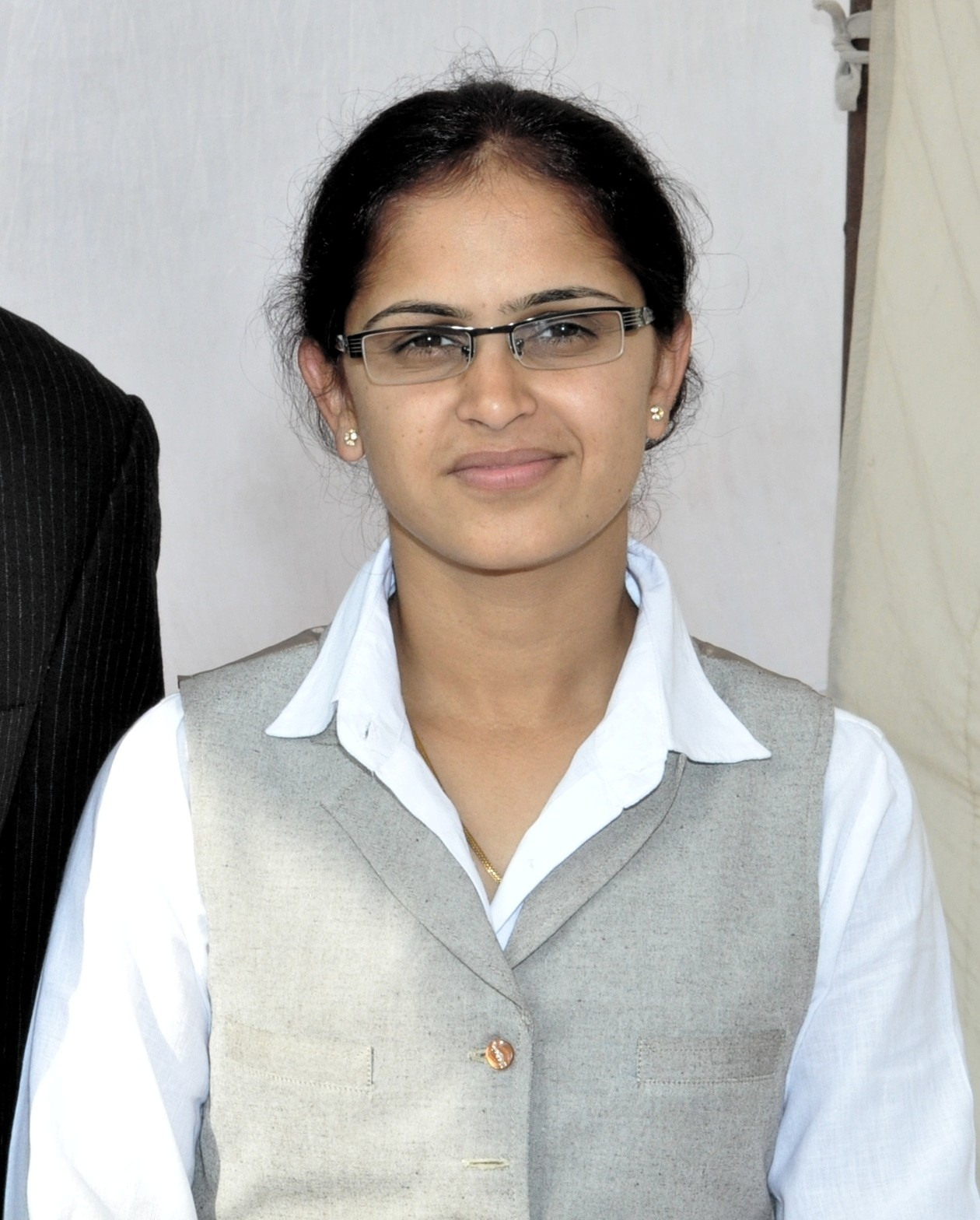

Medal record

Women's field hockey

Representing India

Commonwealth Games
Gold medal – first place	2002 Manchester	Team
Silver medal – second place	2006 Melbourne	Team

Asian Games
Bronze medal – third place	2006 Doha	Team

Hockey Asia Cup
Gold medal – first place	2004 New Delhi	
Silver medal – second place	2009 Bangkok	

Champions Challenge
Bronze medal – third place	2002 Johannesburg	Team

Junior Asia Cup
Bronze medal – third place	2000 Kuala Lumpur	

Girls' Asia Cup
Gold medal – first place	2000 Kowloon	

Mamta Kharab (born 26 January 1982, Rohtak, Haryana) is an Indian former field hockey player, who represented the India women's national field hockey team. She served as the captain of the national team, and, during the 2002 Commonwealth Games, she scored the winning goal that gave India the gold.

Outside of field hockey, Kharab served as the model for the character Komal Chautala in the 2007 Bollywood hit Chak De India. She currently is the Deputy Superintendent of Police at the Haryana Police Department. Kharab is also a recipient of the Arjuna Award and the Bhim Award.

== Early life and education ==
Kharab was born on 26 January 1982 in the village of Giwana, Sonipat District, Haryana, to parents Kamla and Haripal Singh. She grew up in a lower-middle-class family and was one of seven children. Her father Haripal is a primary school teacher in the village of Bidhlan, Sonipat District. Her parents now reside in Model Town area, Rohtak.

Kharab went to school at Senior Secondary School Rohtak in Haryana, before attending MD University, Rohtak.

Kharab's sisters Poonam and Sushma also played hockey at the national level. Sushma currently plays for the Railways.

== Athletic career ==
Kharab has played in a number of championships, both nationally (with the Indian Women's Hockey Federation) and internationally. She played for India in all the international championships she competed in.

Kharab was declared the Best Player of the Tournament and the Best Scorer in the 2000 junior Asia Cup tournament held in Malaysia, where India won the bronze medal. She was adjudged as the Best Player of the Tournament at the inaugural 2000 sub-junior Asia Cup where India won the title. She also played on the winning team of the 2002 Commonwealth Games in Manchester, scoring the winning goal in the final against England. It was India's first gold medal in 32 years.

== Awards ==
=== With the Indian Women’s Hockey Federation ===
- 1999 National (U-21) Tournament, New Jersey, USA, 1st Place.
- 2000 Olympic Qualifying Tournament, Milton Keynes, England
- 2000 3rd Junior Asia Cup, Kuala Lumpur, Malaysia, Bronze Medal
- 2000 U-18 AHF Cup, Hong Kong, China, Gold Medal
- 2001 Test Matches in Australia
- 2001 4th Junior World Cup, Buenos Aires, Argentina
- 2001 10th Women's World Cup Qualification Tournament, France
- 2002 1st Championship Challenge Trophy, Johannesburg, South Africa, Bronze Medal
- 2002 4-Nations hockey Tournament, Manchester (England) 2nd place
- 2002 10th Women's World Cup Qualifying play off matches in England against USA
- 2002 17th Commonwealth Games, Manchester, England, Gold Medal
- 2004 5th Asia Cup, New Delhi, Gold Medal
- 2004 Test Matches in New Zealand
- 2005 Training-cum-competition, Adelaide, Australia, 1 March to 2 April 2005
- 2005 5th KT Cup International Tournament, Seongnam, Korea, 7–17 June 2005
- 2005 4 Nation Tournament, New Delhi 1–8 October 2005 Silver Medal
- 2005 7th Indira Gandhi International Gold Cup Women's Hockey Tournament, New Delhi 1–8 October 2005 Silver Medal
- 2006 18th Commonwealth Games, Melbourne, Australia, Silver Medal

=== Additional awards ===
- Best Player of the Tournament, Junior Asia Cup (Malaysia, 2000)
- Best Scorer of the Tournament, Junior Asia Cup (Malaysia, 2000)
- Bhim Award (2003)
- Arjuna Award (2003)

== Post-athletic career ==
Kharab has been appointed as P/DSP by the state government. She joined on 5 October 2007 and has been further deputed for her Basic Training at Haryana Police Academy, Madhuban.
