= Anna Bennett (field hockey) =

British field hockey player

Personal information
- Nationality: British
- Born: 26 February 1976 (age 50) Reading, England

Sport
- Sport: Field hockey

Anna Bennett (born 26 February 1976) is a British field hockey player. She competed in the women's tournament at the 1996 Summer Olympics.
