= Manjinder Kaur =

Indian field hockey player

Personal information
- Born: 17 July 1975 (age 50)
Medal record
Women's field hockey
Representing India
Asian Games
Silver medal – second place	1998 Bangkok	Team
Commonwealth Games
Gold medal – first place	2002 Manchester	Team
Asia Cup
Silver medal – second place	1999 New Delhi

Manjinder Kaur (born 17 July 1975) is an Indian former field hockey player, who represented the India women's national field hockey team. She played with the team when it won the gold medal at the Manchester 2002 Commonwealth Games.
