= Sita Gussain =

Indian field hockey player

Personal information
- Born: 7 January 1973 (age 53)
Medal record
Women's field hockey
Representing India
Asian Games
Silver medal – second place	1998 Bangkok	Team
Commonwealth Games
Gold medal – first place	2002 Manchester	Team
Asia Cup
Silver medal – second place	1999 New Delhi
Champions Challenge
Bronze medal – third place	2002 Johannesburg	Team

Sita Gussain (born 7 January 1973) is an Indian former field hockey player, who represented the India women's national field hockey team. She played with the team when it won the Gold at the Manchester 2002 Commonwealth Games.
