= Women's Hockey Champions Challenge I =

International field hockey tournament

- Formerly: Women's Hockey Champions Challenge
- Sport: Field hockey
- Founded: 2002
- Folded: 2014
- Replaced by: Women's FIH Hockey World League
- No. of teams: 6–8
- Last champion: United States (1st title)
- Most titles: New Zealand (2 titles)
- Website: www.fihockey.org

The Women's Hockey Champions Challenge I was an international field hockey tournament, played every two years. It was introduced in 2002 by the International Hockey Federation in order to broaden hockey's competitive base at world level. The Champions Challenge was replaced by the Women's FIH Hockey World League in 2014 after eight editions.

== Results ==
=== Summaries ===
Year	Host	Final			3rd place match		
Year	Host	Champions	Score	Runners-up	3rd place	Score	4th place
2002	Johannesburg, South Africa	England	2–1	South Korea	India	1–0	South Africa
2003	Catania, Italy	Germany	3–1	Spain	Japan	2–1	New Zealand
2005	Virginia Beach, United States	New Zealand	2–0	South Africa	Japan	2–1	England
2007	Baku, Azerbaijan	China	2–1	South Korea	England	2–1	United States
2009	Cape Town, South Africa	New Zealand	2–1	South Africa	Japan	1–0	Spain
2011	Dublin, Ireland	Japan	2–1	United States	Scotland	2–2 (4–3 pen.)	Spain
2012	Dublin, Ireland	Australia	6–1	United States	Ireland	2–2 (4–3 pen.)	Scotland
2014	Glasgow, Scotland	United States	3–1	Ireland	South Africa	1–0	Spain

=== Successful national teams ===
Team	Titles	Runners-up	Third places	Fourth places
New Zealand	2 (2005, 2009)			1 (2003)
United States	1 (2014)	2 (2011, 2012)		1 (2007)
Japan	1 (2011)		3 (2003, 2005, 2009)	
England	1 (2002)		1 (2007)	1 (2005)
Germany	1 (2003)			
China	1 (2007)			
Australia	1 (2012)			
South Africa		2 (2005, 2009*)	1 (2014)	1 (2002*)
South Korea		2 (2002, 2007)		
Ireland		1 (2014)	1 (2012*)	
Spain		1 (2003)		3 (2009, 2011, 2014)
Scotland			1 (2011)	1 (2012)
India			1 (2002)	

* = host nation

=== Team appearances ===
Team	2002	2003	2005	2007	2009	2011	2012	2014	Total
Australia	–	–	–	–	–	–	1st	–	1
Azerbaijan	–	–	–	6th	7th	8th	–	–	3
Belgium	–	–	–	–	–	–	5th	6th	2
Chile	–	–	–	–	6th	–	–	–	1
China	–	–	–	1st	–	–	–	–	1
England	1st	–	4th	3rd	–	–	–	–	3
Germany	–	1st	–	–	–	–	–	–	1
India	3rd	–	–	–	–	7th	7th	8th	4
Ireland	–	–	–	–	–	6th	3rd	2nd	3
Italy	–	6th	–	–	5th	–	–	–	2
Japan	–	3rd	3rd	–	3rd	1st	–	–	4
New Zealand	–	4th	1st	5th	1st	–	–	–	4
Russia	6th	–	–	–	–	–	–	–	1
Scotland	–	–	–	–	–	3rd	4th	7th	3
South Africa	4th	–	2nd	–	2nd	5th	6th	3rd	6
South Korea	2nd	–	–	2nd	–	–	–	5th	3
Spain	–	2nd	6th	–	4th	4th	–	4th	5
United States	5th	5th	5th	4th	–	2nd	2nd	1st	7
Wales	–	–	–	–	–	–	8th	–	1
Total	6	6	6	6	7	8	8	8	55
