= 2007 Women's EuroHockey Nations Championship squads =

The article listed the confirmed squad lists for 2007 Women's EuroHockey Nations Championship between August 18 to August 25, 2007.

== Pool A ==
=== Netherlands ===
Head coach: Marc Lammers

| No. | Player | Pos. | Age |
|---|---|---|---|
| 1 | Lisanne de Roever | | 28 |
| 3 | Eefke Mulder | | 29 |
| 4 | Fatima Moreira de Melo | | 29 |
| 5 | Jiske Snoeks | | 29 |
| 7 | Miek van Geenhuizen | | 25 |
| 9 | Wieke Dijkstra | | 23 |
| 13 | Minke Smabers | | 28 |
| 14 | Minke Booij (C) | | 30 |
| 15 | Janneke Schopman | | 30 |

| No. | Player | Pos. | Age |
|---|---|---|---|
| 16 | Carlijn Welten | | 19 |
| 17 | Maartje Paumen | | 21 |
| 18 | Naomi van As | | 24 |
| 19 | Ellen Hoog | | 21 |
| 21 | Sophie Polkamp | | 23 |
| 22 | Floortje Engels | GK | 25 |
| 23 | Kim Lammers | | 26 |
| 24 | Eva de Goede | | 23 |
| 27 | Marilyn Agliotti | | 28 |

=== England ===
Head coach: Danny Kerry

| No. | Player | Pos. | Age |
|---|---|---|---|
| 1 | Katy Roberts | GK | 29 |
| 2 | Beth Storry | GK | 29 |
| 5 | Crista Cullen | | 21 |
| 6 | Melanie Clewlow | | 31 |
| 8 | Helen Richardson | | 25 |
| 9 | Jo Ellis | | 26 |
| 10 | Lucilla Wright | | 27 |
| 11 | Kate Walsh (C) | | 27 |
| 12 | Chloe Rogers | | 22 |

| No. | Player | Pos. | Age |
|---|---|---|---|
| 13 | Jennie Bimson | | 30 |
| 14 | Rachel Walker | | 28 |
| 15 | Alex Danson | | 22 |
| 17 | Rebecca Herbert | | 21 |
| 18 | Sally Walton | | 26 |
| 19 | Hannah Macleod | | 23 |
| 22 | Cathy Gilliat-Smith | | 26 |
| 23 | Kerry Williams | | 21 |
| 28 | Anne Panter | | 23 |

=== Ireland ===
Head coach: Gene Muller

| No. | Player | Pos. | Age |
|---|---|---|---|
| 1 | Mary Goode | GK | 28 |
| 2 | Louisa Healy | GK | 25 |
| 3 | Emer Harte | | 23 |
| 4 | Roisin Flinn | | 21 |
| 5 | Linda Caulfield (C) | | 28 |
| 6 | Eimear Cregan | | 25 |
| 7 | Emma Clarke | | 21 |
| 8 | Emma Stewart | | 19 |
| 9 | Bridget McKeever | | 24 |

| No. | Player | Pos. | Age |
|---|---|---|---|
| 10 | Shirley McCay | | 19 |
| 11 | Jenny McDonough | | 26 |
| 12 | Cathy McKean | | 28 |
| 13 | Alexandra Speers | | 20 |
| 14 | Julia O'Halloran | | 19 |
| 15 | Ciara O'Brien | | 28 |
| 16 | Jill Orbinson | | 28 |
| 18 | Nikki Symmons | | 25 |
| 26 | Clare Parkhill | | 26 |

=== Italy ===
Head coach: Franco Nicola

| No. | Player | Pos. | Age |
|---|---|---|---|
| 1 | Roberta Lilliu | GK | 28 |
| 2 | Stella Girotti (C) | | 28 |
| 3 | Romina Dinucci | | 29 |
| 4 | Simona Berrino | | 21 |
| 5 | Carolina Scandroli | | 26 |
| 7 | Augustina Di Bernardo | | 24 |
| 8 | Maria Victoria Corso | | 30 |
| 9 | Francesca Faustini | | 31 |
| 10 | Daniela Possali | | 21 |

| No. | Player | Pos. | Age |
|---|---|---|---|
| 11 | Jasbeer Singh | | 20 |
| 12 | Anna Russo | GK | 21 |
| 14 | Alejandra Blanco | | 28 |
| 16 | Julieta Obrist | | 23 |
| 17 | Chiara Tiddi | | 18 |
| 19 | Claudia Toretta | | 29 |
| 21 | Valentina Quaranta | | 22 |
| 22 | Marta De Guio | | 19 |

== Pool B ==
=== Germany ===
Head coach: Michael Behrmann

| No. | Player | Pos. | Age |
|---|---|---|---|
| 1 | Yvonne Frank | GK | 27 |
| 2 | Tina Bachmann | | 29 |
| 4 | Mandy Haase | | 25 |
| 6 | Svenja Schürmann | | 23 |
| 7 | Natascha Keller | | 30 |
| 11 | Eileen Hoffmann | | 23 |
| 13 | Marion Rodewald (C) | | 30 |
| 14 | Katharina Scholz | | 24 |
| 16 | Fanny Rinne | | 27 |

| No. | Player | Pos. | Age |
|---|---|---|---|
| 18 | Anke Kühn | | 26 |
| 19 | Britta Von Livonius | | 31 |
| 22 | Janine Beermann | | 23 |
| 24 | Maike Stöckel | | 23 |
| 26 | Christina Schütze | | 23 |
| 27 | Pia Eidmann | | 22 |
| 28 | Julia Müller | | 21 |
| 30 | Jennifer Plass | | 22 |
| 32 | Kristina Reynolds | GK | 23 |

=== Spain ===
Head coach: Pablo Usoz

| No. | Player | Pos. | Age |
|---|---|---|---|
| 1 | María Jesús Rosa | GK | 27 |
| 2 | Julia Menéndez | | 22 |
| 3 | Rocío Ybarra | | 22 |
| 5 | Paula Dabanch | | 20 |
| 8 | Marta Prat | | 26 |
| 9 | Silvia Muñoz (C) | | 27 |
| 10 | Silvia Bonastre | | 25 |
| 11 | María Romagosa | | 21 |
| 12 | Marta Ejarque | | 21 |

| No. | Player | Pos. | Age |
|---|---|---|---|
| 14 | Pilar Sánchez | | 25 |
| 16 | Marta Martin | | 18 |
| 17 | Núria Camón | | 29 |
| 19 | María López | GK | 23 |
| 20 | Montse Cruz | | 27 |
| 21 | Esther Termens | | 22 |
| 22 | Gloria Comerma | | 20 |
| 23 | Georgina Oliva | | 17 |
| 26 | Yurena Panadero | | 24 |

=== Ukraine ===
Head coach: Svitlana Makaieva

| No. | Player | Pos. | Age |
|---|---|---|---|
| 1 | Olha Fisyun | GK | 25 |
| 2 | Yevheniya Moroz | | 19 |
| 3 | Olga Gulenko | | 22 |
| 5 | Olena Ivakhneko | | 22 |
| 6 | Olha Hryzodub | | 23 |
| 7 | Zhanna Savenko | | 28 |
| 9 | Maryna Khilko | | 22 |
| 10 | Nataliya Vasyukova | | 27 |
| 11 | Maryna Vynohradova | | 24 |

| No. | Player | Pos. | Age |
|---|---|---|---|
| 12 | Yana Vorushylo | | 23 |
| 13 | Halyna Hlynenko | | 19 |
| 14 | Tetyana Salenko (C) | | 29 |
| 15 | Bohdana Sadova | | 17 |
| 16 | Alvina Budonna | GK | 19 |
| 17 | Syusana Shabunina | | 18 |
| 18 | Diana Tahiyeva | | 27 |
| 19 | Iryna Krukovska | | 25 |
| 22 | Iryna Vyhanyaylo | | 21 |

=== Azerbaijan ===
Head coach: Tahir Zaman

| No. | Player | Pos. | Age |
|---|---|---|---|
| 1 | Seda Kheyirova | GK |
| 3 | Nazira Hidayatova |
| 4 | Emine Muzaffarova |
| 5 | Zarifahon Zeynalova |
| 6 | Feruza Makayeva |
| 8 | Dilfuza Mirzaliyeva |
| 10 | Zeynab Nuriyeva (C) |
| 11 | Gulnara Mikayilova |
| 12 | Tak Gurbanova |

| No. | Player | Pos. | Age |
|---|---|---|---|
| 15 | Liana Nuriyeva |
| 16 | Marina Aliyeva |
| 20 | Viktoriya Shahbazova | GK |
| 21 | Natalya Sidorova |
| 24 | Zhun Mammadova |
| 25 | Inoyathon Jafarova |
| 26 | Kim Aliyeva |
| 27 | Zhang Suleymanova |
| 29 | Kwon Musayeva |
