= 2005 Women's Hockey Champions Trophy =

Field hockey tournament

Tournament details
- Host country: Australia
- City: Canberra
- Teams: 6
- Venue: National Hockey Centre

Final positions
- Champions: Netherlands (4th title)
- Runner-up: Australia
- Third place: China

Tournament statistics
- Matches played: 18
- Goals scored: 55 (3.06 per match)
- Top scorer(s): (Argentina) Soledad García (Netherlands) Sylvia Karres (4 goals)
- Best player: (Argentina) Luciana Aymar

The 2005 Women's Hockey Champions Trophy was the 13th edition of the Hockey Champions Trophy for women. It was held from 26 November to 4 December 2005 in Canberra, Australia.

The Netherlands won the tournament for the fourth time after defeating Australia 5–4 in the final on penalty strokes after a 0–0 draw.

== Teams ==
The participating teams were determined by International Hockey Federation (FIH):

- Netherlands (Defending champions)
- Germany (Champions of 2004 Summer Olympics)
- Argentina (Champions of 2002 World Cup)
- Australia (Host nation)
- China (Fourth in 2004 Summer Olympics)
- South Korea (Seventh in 2004 Summer Olympics)

== Squads ==
Argentina

Head Coach: Gabriel Minadeo

2. Marien Bianchini
3. Magdalena Aicega (c)
4. Rosario Luchetti
6. Ayelén Stepnik
7. Alejandra Gulla
8. Luciana Aymar
9. Macarena Rodríguez
10. Soledad García
12. Mariana González Oliva
13. Laura Aladro (GK)
14. Mercedes Margalot
15. María de la Paz Hernández
17. Florencia D'Elía
18. Paola Vukojicic (GK)
19. Mariné Russo
21. Inés Arrondo
23. Natali Doreski
24. Claudia Burkart
Australia

Head Coach: Frank Murray

1. Toni Cronk (GK)
3. Karen Smith
6. Megan Rivers
7. Kim Walker
9. Rebecca Sanders
10. Kate Hollywood
11. Emily Halliday
12. Madonna Blyth
13. Wendy Alcorn
14. Nicole Arrold
15. Kobie McGurk
17. Rachel Imison (GK)
18. Emma Meyer
22. Amy Korner
24. Angie Skirving
25. Melanie Twitt
30. Sarah Talor
32. Nikki Hudson (c)
China

Head Coach: Kim Chang-back

1. Chen Zhaoxia
2. Huang Xuejiao
3. Chen Lizhu
4. Ma Yibo
5. Huang Junxia
6. Mai Shaoyan
7. Song Qingling
9. Li Shuang
10. Gao Lihua
11. Tang Chunling
12. Zhou Wanfeng (c)
16. Zhang Yimeng (GK)
18. Ren Ye
19. Chen Qiuqi
22. Li Aili
28. Li Hongxia
30. He Haiying
31. Pan Fengzhen (GK)
Germany

Head Coach: Markus Weise

1. Yvonne Frank (GK)
2. Tina Bachmann
3. Inga Matthes
4. Mandy Haase
5. Nadine Ernsting-Krienke
6. Svenja Schürmann
7. Natascha Keller
8. Kerstin Hoyer
9. Martina Heinlein
10. Silke Müller
11. Eileen Hoffmann
12. Karin Blank (GK)
13. Marion Rodewald (c)
14. Katharina Scholz
18. Anke Kühn
24. Maike Stöckel
25. Anna Geiter
26. Christina Schütze
Netherlands

Head Coach: Marc Lammers

1. Lisanne de Roever (GK)
3. Mignonne Meekels
4. Fatima Moreira de Melo
5. Jiske Snoeks
7. Miek van Geenhuizen
9. Sylvia Karres
10. Saskia Fuchs
11. Maartje Goderie
12. Leonoor Voskamp
14. Minke Booij (c)
15. Janneke Schopman
16. Chantal de Bruijn
17. Maartje Paumen
18. Naomi van As
19. Ellen Hoog
21. Sophie Polkamp
22. Floortje Engels (GK)
23. Kim Lammers
South Korea

Head Coach: Han Jin-Soo

1. Lim Ju-young
2. Cho Hye-sook
3. Choi Eun-young
4. Cha Se-na
5. Gim Sang-hee
6. Park Young-soon
7. Oh Ko-woon
8. Kim Jung-hee
9. Park Mi-hyun
10. Kim Jin-kyoung
11. Kim Jong-eun
12. Han Tae-jeong
13. Kim Mi-seon
15. Kim Bo-mi
16. Moon Young-hui
17. Eun Mi-young
18. Park Jeong-sook
19. Kim Eun-sil

== Umpires ==
Below are the 8 umpires appointed by the International Hockey Federation:

- Judy Barnesby (AUS)
- Ute Conen (GER)
- Marelize de Klerk (RSA)
- Carolina de la Fuente (ARG)
- Lyn Farrell (NZL)
- Kang Hyun-young (KOR)
- Lisette Klaassen (NED)
- Kazuko Yasueda (JPN)

== Results ==
All times are Eastern Daylight Time (UTC+11:00)

=== Pool ===
| Pos | Team | Pld | W | D | L | GF | GA | GD | Pts | Qualification |
|---|---|---|---|---|---|---|---|---|---|---|
| 1 | Australia | 5 | 4 | 1 | 0 | 9 | 2 | +7 | 13 | Final |
| 2 | Netherlands | 5 | 3 | 1 | 1 | 15 | 6 | +9 | 10 | Final |
| 3 | Argentina | 5 | 3 | 1 | 1 | 11 | 6 | +5 | 10 | |
| 4 | China | 5 | 2 | 1 | 2 | 3 | 5 | −2 | 7 | |
| 5 | Germany | 5 | 1 | 0 | 4 | 4 | 15 | −11 | 3 | |
| 6 | South Korea | 5 | 0 | 0 | 5 | 3 | 11 | −8 | 0 | |

Source: FIH
Rules for classification: 1) points; 2) goal difference; 3) goals scored; 4) head-to-head result.

26 November 2005
11:00

| Netherlands | 2–1 | Argentina |
|---|---|---|
| Karres 9'; Paumen 70' | Report | Aymar 61' |

Umpires:
Marelize de Klerk (RSA)
Ute Conen (GER)

26 November 2005
13:00

| China | 1–0 | South Korea |
|---|---|---|
| Zhou 14' | Report |

Umpires:
Carolina de la Fuente (ARG)
Judy Barnesby (AUS)

26 November 2005
15:00

| Australia | 2–0 | Germany |
|---|---|---|
| Sanders 6'; Hudson 45' | Report |

Umpires:
Lyn Farrell (NZL)
Kazuko Yasueda (JPN)

27 November 2005
11:00

| Argentina | 3–0 | China |
|---|---|---|
| Hernández 14'; D'Elía 58'; Gulla 64' | Report |

Umpires:
Lyn Farrell (NZL)
Kang Hyun-young (KOR)

27 November 2005
13:00

| Germany | 1–8 | Netherlands |
|---|---|---|
| Stöckel 62' | Report | Lammers 1'; Hoog 4'; Schopman 43'; Karres 44'; Van Geenhuizen 48'; Fuchs 50', 66'; Goderie 63' |

Umpires:
Carolina de la Fuente (ARG)
Judy Barnesby (AUS)

27 November 2005
15:00

| South Korea | 0–2 | Australia |
|---|---|---|
| | Report | Smith 42'; Hudson 63' |

Umpires:
Marelize de Klerk (RSA)
Lisette Klaassen (NED)

29 November 2005
16:00

| Netherlands | 3–0 | South Korea |
|---|---|---|
| Lammers 9', 56'; Karres 37' | Report |

Umpires:
Lyn Farrell (NZL)
Kazuko Yasueda (JPN)

29 November 2005
18:00

| Australia | 1–0 | China |
|---|---|---|
| Skirving 45' | Report |

Umpires:
Ute Conen (GER)
Carolina de la Fuente (ARG)

29 November 2005
20:00

| Germany | 1–3 | Argentina |
|---|---|---|
| Ernsting-Krienke 62' | Report | García 5', 44'; Aymar 46' |

Umpires:
Lisette Klaassen (NED)
Marelize de Klerk (RSA)

1 December 2005
16:00

| China | 1–1 | Netherlands |
|---|---|---|
| Tang 30' | Report | Hoog 28' |

Umpires:
Judy Barnesby (AUS)
Ute Conen (GER)

1 December 2005
18:00

| South Korea | 1–2 | Germany |
|---|---|---|
| Kim E. 7' | Report | Hoyer 8'; Rodewald 70+' |

Umpires:
Carolina de la Fuente (ARG)
Kazuko Yasueda (JPN)

1 December 2005
20:00

| Argentina | 1–1 | Australia |
|---|---|---|
| Gulla 7' | Report | Blyth 61' |

Umpires:
Marelize de Klerk (RSA)
Lyn Farrell (NZL)

3 December 2005
11:00

| Argentina | 3–2 | South Korea |
|---|---|---|
| García 9', 62'; Aicega 47' | Report | Kim E. 19'; Oh 31' |

Umpires:
Lisette Klaassen (NED)
Lyn Farrell (NZL)

3 December 2005
13:00

| Germany | 0–1 | China |
|---|---|---|
| | Report | Ma 34' |

Umpires:
Kang Hyun-young (KOR)
Marelize de Klerk (RSA)

3 December 2005
15:00

| Australia | 3–1 | Netherlands |
|---|---|---|
| Blyth 11'; Sanders 55'; Skirving 63' | Report | Karres 12' |

Umpires:
Ute Conen (GER)
Kazuko Yasueda (JPN)

=== Classification ===
==== Fifth and sixth place ====
4 December 2005
10:00

| Germany | 5–1 | South Korea |
|---|---|---|
| Ernsting-Krienke 5'; Müller 16'; Stöckel 50'; Hoyer 52'; Natascha Keller 59' | Report | Park M. 38' |

Umpires:
Judy Barnesby (AUS)
Carolina de la Fuente (ARG)

==== Third and fourth place ====
4 December 2005
12:30

| Argentina | 2–2 (a.e.t.) | China |
|---|---|---|
| Margalot 6'; Gulla 22' | Report | Gao 46'; Ma 67' |
Penalties
| Gulla (penalty shoot-out scored); Margalot (penalty shoot-out scored); González Oliva (penalty shoot-out missed); Aymar (penalty shoot-out scored); Burkart (penalty shoot-out scored) ——— Margalot (penalty shoot-out scored); Gulla (penalty shoot-out missed); Aymar (penalty shoot-out scored); Burkart (penalty shoot-out scored); González Oliva (penalty shoot-out scored); Margalot (penalty shoot-out missed) | 8–9 | (penalty shoot-out scored) Ma; (penalty shoot-out missed) Chen Qi. (penalty shoot-out scored) Zhou; (penalty shoot-out scored) Tang; (penalty shoot-out scored) Li S. ——— (penalty shoot-out scored) Ma; (penalty shoot-out missed) Zhou; (penalty shoot-out scored) Tang; (penalty shoot-out scored) Li S. (penalty shoot-out scored) Chen Qi. (penalty shoot-out scored) Ma |

Umpires:
Kazuko Yasueda (JPN)
Lyn Farrell (NZL)

==== Final ====
4 December 2005
15:00

| Australia | 0–0 (a.e.t.) | Netherlands |
|---|---|---|
| | Report |
Penalties
| Arrold (penalty shoot-out scored); Skirving (penalty shoot-out missed); Hudson (penalty shoot-out scored); Halliday (penalty shoot-out scored); Sanders (penalty shoot-out scored) ——— Arrold (penalty shoot-out missed) | 4–5 | (penalty shoot-out scored) Paumen; (penalty shoot-out missed) Schopman; (penalty shoot-out scored) Lammers; (penalty shoot-out scored) Moreira de Melo; (penalty shoot-out scored) Goderie ——— (penalty shoot-out scored) Paumen |

Umpires:
Marelize de Klerk (RSA)
Ute Conen (GER)

== Awards ==
| Player of the Tournament | Top Goalscorers |
|---|---|
| (Argentina) Luciana Aymar | (Argentina) Soledad García (Netherlands) Sylvia Karres |

== Statistics ==
=== Final standings ===
1. Netherlands
2. Australia
3. China
4. Argentina
5. Germany
6. South Korea

=== Goalscorers ===
There were 55 goals scored in 18 matches, for an average of 3.06 goals per match.

4 goals

- (Argentina) Soledad García
- (Netherlands) Sylvia Karres

3 goals

- (Argentina) Alejandra Gulla
- (Netherlands) Kim Lammers

2 goals

- (Argentina) Luciana Aymar
- (Australia) Madonna Blyth
- (Australia) Nikki Hudson
- (Australia) Rebecca Sanders
- (Australia) Angie Skirving
- (China) Ma Yibo
- (Germany) Nadine Ernsting-Krienke
- (Germany) Kerstin Hoyer
- (Germany) Maike Stöckel
- (Netherlands) Saskia Fuchs
- (Netherlands) Ellen Hoog
- (South Korea) Kim Eun-Sil

1 goal

- (Argentina) Magdalena Aicega
- (Argentina) Florencia D'Elía
- (Argentina) María de la Paz Hernández
- (Argentina) Mercedes Margalot
- (Australia) Karen Smith
- (China) Gao Lihua
- (China) Tang Chunling
- (China) Zhou Wanfeng
- (Germany) Natascha Keller
- (Germany) Silke Müller
- (Germany) Marion Rodewald
- (Netherlands) Maartje Goderie
- (Netherlands) Maartje Paumen
- (Netherlands) Janneke Schopman
- (Netherlands) Miek van Geenhuizen
- (South Korea) Oh Ko-Woon
- (South Korea) Park Mi-Hyun

Source: FIH
