= 2006 Women's Hockey Champions Trophy =

Tournament details
- Host country: Netherlands
- City: Amstelveen
- Dates: 8 – 16 July
- Teams: 6
- Venue: Wagener Stadium

Final positions
- Champions: Germany (1st title)
- Runner-up: China
- Third place: Netherlands

Tournament statistics
- Matches played: 18
- Goals scored: 59 (3.28 per match)
- Top scorer(s): (China) Li Hongxia (China) Ma Yibo (Germany) Fanny Rinne (4 goals)
- Best player: (China) Fu Baorong

The 2006 Women's Hockey Champions Trophy was the 14th edition of the Hockey Champions Trophy for women. It was held between 8–16 July 2006 in Amstelveen, Netherlands.

Germany won the tournament for the first time after defeating China 3–2 in the final.

The tournament had begun on 8 July with Germany defeating China 3–2 in the first match. In an identical score line, Germany prevailed upon China 3–2 in the final played on 16 July.

== Teams ==
The participating teams were determined by International Hockey Federation (FIH):

- Netherlands (Host nation and defending champions)
- Germany (Champions of 2004 Summer Olympics)
- Argentina (Champions of 2002 World Cup)
- China (Fourth in 2004 Summer Olympics)
- Australia (Fifth in 2004 Summer Olympics)
- New Zealand (Sixth in 2004 Summer Olympics)

== Squads ==
Argentina

Head coach: Gabriel Minadeo

1. Mariela Antoniska (GK)
2. Marien Bianchini
3. Magdalena Aicega (C)
4. Rosario Luchetti
6. Ayelen Stepnik
7. Alejandra Gulla
8. Luciana Aymar
10. Soledad García
11. Carla Rebecchi
12. Mariana González Oliva
14. Mercedes Margalot
15. María de la Paz Hernández
17. Florencia D'Elía
18. Paolo Vukojicic (GK)
19. Mariné Russo
22. Gabriela Aguirre
34. Claudia Burkart
35. Agustina Bouza
Australia

Head coach: Frank Murray

2. Suzie Faulkner
3. Karen Smith
6. Megan Rivers
7. Wim Walker
9. Rebecca Sanders
10. Kate Hollywood
11. Emily Halliday
12. Madonna Blyth
14. Nicole Arrold
15. Kobie McGurk
17. Rachel Imison (GK)
19. Donna-Lee Patrick
24. Angela Lambert
25. Melanie Twitt
27. Rachael Lynch (GK)
19. Teneal Attard
20. Sarah Taylor
32. Nikki Hudson (C)
China

Head coach: (South Korea) Kim Chang-Back

3. Chen Zhaoxia
4. Ma Yibo (C)
6. Mai Shaoyan
8. Fu Baorong
9. Li Shuang
10. Gao Lihua
12. Zhou Wanfeng
13. Sun Zhen
16. Zhang Yimeng (GK)
17. Li Hongxia
18. Ren Ye
19. Chen Qiuqi
23. Ju Xiaoyu
26. Xing Qian (GK)
27. Bao Ejing
28. Wang Yanhui
31. Pan Fengzhen (GK)
Germany

Head coach: Markus Weise

1. Yvonne Frank
2. Tina Bachmann
4. Mandy Haase
5. Nadine Ernsting-Krienke
6. Svenja Schuermann
7. Natascha Keller
8. Kerstin Hoyer
9. Martina Heinlein
10. Silke Müller
13. Marion Rodewald (C)
14. Katharina Scholz
16. Fanny Rinne (C)
18. Anke Kühn
19. Britta von Livonius
21. Badri Latif
22. Janine Beermann
24. Maike Stöckel
32. Kristina Reynolds (GK)
Netherlands

Head coach: Marc Lammers

1. Lisanne de Roever (GK)
3. Eefke Mulder
4. Fatima Moreira de Melo
7. Miek van Geenhuizen
9. Wieke Dijkstra
10. Sylvia Karres
13. Minke Smabers
14. Minke Booij (C)
15. Janneke Schopman
16. Chantal de Bruijn
17. Maartje Paumen
18. Naomi van As
19. Ellen Hoog
20. Eveline de Haan (GK)
21. Sophie Polkamp
23. Kim Lammers
24. Eva de Goede
25. Vera Vorstenbosch
New Zealand

Head coach: Ian Rutledge

2. Emily Naylor
3. Krystal Forgesson
4. Kate Saunders
5. Laura Douglas
9. Honor Dillon
11. Stacey Carr
13. Joanne Galletly
15. Beth Jurgeleit (GK)
16. Clarissa Eshuis
18. Diana Weavers (C)
19. Jane Maley
20. Frances Kreft
22. Rachel Robertson
23. Tara Drysdale
24. Sheree Horvath Phillips
25. Kate Mahon
26. Anita Wawatai (GK)
28. Charlotte Harrison

== Umpires ==
Below are the 8 umpires appointed by the International Hockey Federation:

- Chieko Akiyama (JPN)
- Judy Barnesby (AUS)
- Stella Bartlema (NED)
- Ute Conen (GER)
- Hu Youfang (CHN)
- Soledad Iparraguirre (ARG)
- Louise Knipe (ENG)
- Lee Keum-ju (KOR)

== Results ==
All times are Central European Summer Time (UTC+02:00)

=== Pool ===
| Pos | Team | Pld | W | D | L | GF | GA | GD | Pts | Qualification |
|---|---|---|---|---|---|---|---|---|---|---|
| 1 | China | 5 | 3 | 1 | 1 | 12 | 6 | +6 | 10 | Final |
| 2 | Germany | 5 | 3 | 0 | 2 | 11 | 8 | +3 | 9 | Final |
| 3 | Argentina | 5 | 3 | 0 | 2 | 11 | 10 | +1 | 9 | |
| 4 | Netherlands | 5 | 2 | 2 | 1 | 10 | 5 | +5 | 8 | |
| 5 | Australia | 5 | 1 | 2 | 2 | 5 | 6 | −1 | 5 | |
| 6 | New Zealand | 5 | 0 | 1 | 4 | 0 | 14 | −14 | 1 | |

Source: FIH
Rules for classification: 1) points; 2) goal difference; 3) goals scored; 4) head-to-head result.

8 July 2006
10:30

| Germany | 3–2 | China |
|---|---|---|
| Rinne 6'; Ernsting-Krienke 40'; Stöckel 49' | Report | Sun 12'; Li H. 24' |

Umpires:
Stella Bartlema (NED)
Lee Keum-ju (KOR)

8 July 2006
13:00

| New Zealand | 0–3 | Argentina |
|---|---|---|
| | Report | Gulla 6'; García 31'; Aymar 47' |

Umpires:
Chieko Akiyama (JPN)
Louise Knipe (ENG)

8 July 2006
15:30

| Netherlands | 0–0 | Australia |
|---|---|---|
| | Report |

Umpires:
Soledad Iparraguirre (ARG)
Ute Conen (GER)

9 July 2006
11:00

| Argentina | 1–3 | China |
|---|---|---|
| Gulla 45' | Report | Zhou 12'; Ren 18'; Ma 35' |

Umpires:
Ute Conen (GER)
Judy Barnesby (AUS)

9 July 2006
13:30

| Netherlands | 3–1 | Germany |
|---|---|---|
| Paumen 12'; Karres 25'; Hoog 55' | Report | Beermann 10' |

Umpires:
Louise Knipe (ENG)
Chieko Akiyama (JPN)

9 July 2006
16:00

| Australia | 0–0 | New Zealand |
|---|---|---|
| | Report |

Umpires:
Hu Youfang (CHN)
Lee Keum-ju (KOR)

11 July 2006
14:00

| China | 2–1 | Australia |
|---|---|---|
| Ma 3'; Fu 8' | Report | Halliday 16' |

Umpires:
Chieko Akiyama (JPN)
Soledad Iparraguirre (ARG)

11 July 2006
16:30

| Germany | 3–1 | Argentina |
|---|---|---|
| Müller 17'; Beermann 33'; Keller 42' | Report | Aymar 27' |

Umpires:
Lee Keum-ju (KOR)
Stella Bartlema (NED)

11 July 2006
19:30

| New Zealand | 0–4 | Netherlands |
|---|---|---|
| | Report | Karres 15'; Vorstenbosch 17'; Paumen 60'; Mulder 63' |

Umpires:
Judy Barnesby (AUS)
Ute Conen (GER)

13 July 2006
14:00

| New Zealand | 0–3 | Germany |
|---|---|---|
| | Report | Keller 16'; Rinne 44'; Hoyer 69' |

Umpires:
Judy Barnesby (AUS)
Hu Youfang (CHN)

13 July 2006
16:30

| Australia | 2–3 | Argentina |
|---|---|---|
| Smith 8'; Hudson 44' | Report | García 42'; Hernández 50'; Aymar 70' |

Umpires:
Stella Bartlema (NED)
Louise Knipe (ENG)

13 July 2006
19:30

| Netherlands | 1–1 | China |
|---|---|---|
| Mulder 48' | Report | Li H. 37' |

Umpires:
Soledad Iparraguirre (ARG)
Chieko Akiyama (JPN)

15 July 2006
10:00

| China | 4–0 | New Zealand |
|---|---|---|
| Ma 3'; Li H. 7'; Ren 50'; Fu 55' | Report |

Umpires:
Louise Knipe (ENG)
Lee Keum-ju (KOR)

15 July 2006
12:00

| Germany | 1–2 | Australia |
|---|---|---|
| Ernsting-Krienke 63' | Report | Smith 23'; Blyth 62' |

Umpires:
Stella Bartlema (NED)
Soledad Iparraguirre (ARG)

15 July 2006
14:00

| Argentina | 3–2 | Netherlands |
|---|---|---|
| Hernández 7'; Gulla 12'; García 69' | Report | Schopman 26'; Lammers 32' |

Umpires:
Judy Barnesby (AUS)
Ute Conen (GER)

=== Classification ===
==== Fifth and sixth place ====
16 July 2006
10:00

| Australia | 2–1 | New Zealand |
|---|---|---|
| Patrick 50', 61' | Report | Dillon 67' |

Umpires:
Stella Bartlema (NED)
Lee Keum-ju (KOR)

==== Third and fourth place ====
16 July 2006
12:30

| Argentina | 1–1 (a.e.t.) | Netherlands |
|---|---|---|
| Margalot 66' | Report | Vorstenbosch 53' |
Penalties
| Margalot (penalty shoot-out missed); Gulla (penalty shoot-out missed); Aymar (penalty shoot-out scored) | 1–4 | (penalty shoot-out scored) Paumen; (penalty shoot-out scored) De Bruijn; (penalty shoot-out scored) Lammers; (penalty shoot-out scored) Smabers |

Umpires:
Judy Barnesby (AUS)
Ute Conen (GER)

==== Final ====
16 July 2006
15:00

| China | 2–3 | Germany |
|---|---|---|
| Li Hongxia 9'; Ma Yibo 42' | Report | Rinne 11', 70'; Keller 43' |

Umpires:
Soledad Iparraguirre (ARG)
Chieko Akiyama (JPN)

== Awards ==
| Player of the Tournament | Top Goalscorers | Young Player of the Tournament | Fair Play Trophy |
|---|---|---|---|
| (China) Fu Baorong | (China) Li Hongxia (China) Ma Yibo (Germany) Fanny Rinne | (Netherlands) Naomi van As | New Zealand |

== Statistics ==
=== Final standings ===
1. Germany
2. China
3. Netherlands
4. Argentina
5. Australia
6. New Zealand

=== Goalscorers ===
There were 59 goals scored in 18 matches, for an average of 3.28 goals per match.

4 goals

- (China) Li Hongxia
- (China) Ma Yibo
- (Germany) Fanny Rinne

3 goals

- (Argentina) Luciana Aymar
- (Argentina) Soledad García
- (Argentina) Alejandra Gulla
- (Germany) Natascha Keller

2 goals

- (Argentina) María de la Paz Hernández
- (Australia) Donna-Lee Patrick
- (Australia) Karen Smith
- (China) Fu Baorong
- (China) Ren Ye
- (Germany) Janine Beermann
- (Germany) Nadine Ernsting-Krienke
- (Netherlands) Sylvia Karres
- (Netherlands) Vera Vorstenbosch
- (Netherlands) Maartje Paumen
- (Netherlands) Eefke Mulder

1 goal

- (Argentina) Mercedes Margalot
- (Australia) Madonna Blyth
- (Australia) Emily Halliday
- (Australia) Nikki Hudson
- (China) Sun Zhen
- (China) Zhou Wanfeng
- (Germany) Kerstin Hoyer
- (Germany) Silke Müller
- (Germany) Maike Stöckel
- (Netherlands) Ellen Hoog
- (Netherlands) Kim Lammers
- (Netherlands) Janneke Schopman
- (New Zealand) Honor Dillon

Source: FIH
