= 2004 Women's Hockey Champions Trophy =

International hockey tournament

Tournament details
- Host country: Argentina
- City: Rosario
- Teams: 6
- Venue: Jockey Club de Rosario

Final positions
- Champions: Netherlands (3rd title)
- Runner-up: Germany
- Third place: Argentina

Tournament statistics
- Matches played: 18
- Goals scored: 54 (3 per match)
- Top scorer: (Argentina) Alejandra Gulla (6 goals)
- Best player: (Argentina) Luciana Aymar

The 2004 Women's Hockey Champions Trophy was the 12th edition of the Hockey Champions Trophy for women. It was held between 6–14 November 2004 in Rosario, Argentina.

The Netherlands won the tournament for the third time after defeating Germany 2–0 in the final.

== Teams ==
The participating teams were determined by International Hockey Federation (FIH):

- Australia (Defending champions)
- Germany (Champions of 2004 Summer Olympics)
- Argentina (Host nation and champion of 2002 World Cup)
- Netherlands (Second in 2004 Summer Olympics)
- China (Fourth in 2004 Summer Olympics)
- New Zealand (Sixth in 2004 Summer Olympics)

== Squads ==
Argentina

Head Coach: Sergio Vigil

1. Mariela Antoniska (GK)
3. Magdalena Aicega (c)
4. María Paz Ferrari
6. Ayelén Stepnik
7. Alejandra Gulla
8. Luciana Aymar
9. Vanina Oneto
10. Soledad García
12. Mariana González Oliva
14. Mercedes Margalot
15. María de la Paz Hernández
16. Cecilia Rognoni
19. Mariné Russo
20. Carla Rebecchi
21. Inés Arrondo
22. Ángela Cattaneo (GK)
23. Natalí Doreski
24. Claudia Burkart
Australia

Head Coach: David Bell

1. Toni Cronk (GK)
3. Karen Smith
5. Ngaire Smith
6. Megan Rivers
7. Peta Gallagher
8. Susannah Harris
9. Rebecca Sanders
11. Emily Halliday
12. Madonna Blyth
14. Nicole Arrold
16. Cindy Morgan (GK)
18. Emma Meyer
19. Donna-Lee Patrick
21. Hope Brown
26. Ursula Ditton
27. Suzie Faulkner
29. Teneal Attard
32. Nikki Hudson (c)
China

Head Coach: Kim Chang-back

2. Xuejiao Huang
4. Ma Yibo
6. Mai Shaoyan
8. Fu Baorong
9. Li Shuang
10. Gao Lihua
12. Zhou Wanfeng (c)
14. Chen Qunqing
16. Zhang Yimeng (GK)
17. Qiu Yingling
19. Chen Qiuqi
20. Wang Yi
22. Li Aili
24. Song Qingling
27. Yu Dan
28. Wang Yanhui
32. Zhang Xiaolei (GK)
Germany

Head Coach: Markus Weise

1. Yvonne Frank (GK)
2. Tina Bachmann
3. Inga Matthes
5. Nadine Ernsting-Krienke
7. Natascha Keller
8. Kerstin Hoyer
9. Martina Heinlein
10. Silke Müller
11. Eileen Hoffmann
12. Karin Blank (GK)
13. Marion Rodewald (c)
15. Janina Totzke
16. Fanny Rinne
18. Anke Kühn
19. Britta von Livonius
20. Alexandra Kollmar
24. Maike Stöckel
26. Christina Schütze
Netherlands

Head Coach: Marc Lammers

2. Lisanne de Roever (GK)
3. Mignonne Meekels
4. Fatima Moreira de Melo
6. Maartje Scheepstra
7. Miek van Geenhuizen
8. Jakolien van Eijk
10. Saskia Fuchs
11. Maartje Goderie
12. Leonoor Voskamp
13. Minke Smabers
14. Minke Booij (c)
15. Janneke Schopman
16. Chantal de Bruijn
17. Maartje Paumen
18. Naomi van As
19. Ellen Hoog
20. Eveline de Haan (GK)
23. Kim Lammers
New Zealand

Head Coach: Ian Rutledge

1. Kayla Sharland
2. Emily Naylor
3. Karlie Maloney
4. Jessica Brewster
5. Rachel Sutherland
6. Meredith Orr
7. Moira Senior
9. Honor Dillon
10. Lizzy Igasan
11. Stacey Carr
13. Jo Galletly
15. Beth Jurgeleit (GK)
18. Diana Weavers (c)
21. Niniwa Roberts-Lang
22. Rachel Robertson
23. Tara Drysdale
24. Sheree Phillips
26. Anita Wawatai (GK)

== Umpires ==
Below are the 8 umpires appointed by the International Hockey Federation:

- Corinne Cornelius (RSA)
- Carolina de la Fuente (ARG)
- Alison Hill (ENG)
- Soledad Iparraguirre (ARG)
- Anne McRae (SCO)
- Mónica Rivera Fraga (ESP)
- Lisa Roach (AUS)
- Kazuko Yasueda (JPN)

== Results ==
All times are Argentina Time (UTC−03:00)

=== Pool ===
Pos	Team	Pld	W	D	L	GF	GA	GD	Pts	Qualification
1	Netherlands	5	3	2	0	9	2	+7	11	Final
2	Germany	5	3	2	0	8	4	+4	11	Final
3	Argentina	5	3	1	1	16	3	+13	10	
4	Australia	5	2	0	3	6	8	−2	6	
5	New Zealand	5	0	2	3	3	16	−13	2	
6	China	5	0	1	4	2	11	−9	1	

Source: FIH
Rules for classification: 1) points; 2) goal difference; 3) goals scored; 4) head-to-head result.

6 November 2004
13:45

China	0–2	Netherlands
	Report	Fuchs 52'; Lammers 59'

Umpires:
Soledad Iparraguirre (ARG)
Alison Hill (ENG)

6 November 2004
16:00

Australia	0–1	Germany
	Report	Kühn 45'

Umpires:
Carolina de la Fuente (ARG)
Anne McRae (SCO)

6 November 2004
18:15

Argentina	6–0	New Zealand
Gulla 24', 53', 69'; Russo 37'; Aymar 41'; García 46'	Report

Umpires:
Kazuko Yasueda (JPN)
Lisa Roach (AUS)

7 November 2004
16:00

Netherlands	2–1	Australia
De Bruijn 45'; Scheepstra 59'	Report	Faulkner 9'

Umpires:
Soledad Iparraguirre (ARG)
Mónica Rivera Fraga (ESP)

7 November 2004
18:15

New Zealand	1–1	China
Drysdale 27'	Report	Chen Qi. 10'

Umpires:
Corrine Cornelius (RSA)
Carolina de la Fuente (ARG)

7 November 2004
21:15

Germany	2–0	Argentina
Hoyer 40'; Rodewald 57'	Report

Umpires:
Alison Hill (ENG)
Kazuko Yasueda (JPN)

9 November 2004
16:00

China	1–2	Germany
Gao 50'	Report	Ernsting-Krienke 4', 35'

Umpires:
Soledad Iparraguirre (ARG)
Corrine Cornelius (RSA)

9 November 2004
18:15

New Zealand	0–4	Netherlands
	Report	Moreira de Melo 19'; Lammers 27', 70'; Scheepstra 46'

Umpires:
Anne McRae (SCO)
Lisa Roach (AUS)

9 November 2004
21:15

Australia	1–5	Argentina
Faulkner 46'	Report	Gulla 20'; Oneto 23', 56'; García 36', 40'

Umpires:
Alison Hill (ENG)
Mónica Rivera Fraga (ESP)

11 November 2004
16:00

Germany	2–2	New Zealand
Keller 37'; Schütze 50'	Report	Orr 31'; Igasan 41'

Umpires:
Anne McRae (SCO)
Kazuko Yasueda (JPN)

11 November 2004
18:15

China	0–1	Australia
	Report	Brown 3'

Umpires:
Carolina de la Fuente (ARG)
Soledad Iparraguirre (ARG)

11 November 2004
21:15

Argentina	0–0	Netherlands
	Report

Umpires:
Alison Hill (ENG)
Mónica Rivera Fraga (ESP)

13 November 2004
13:45

New Zealand	0–3	Australia
	Report	Arrold 19', 61'; Hudson 46'

Umpires:
Corrine Cornelius (RSA)
Carolina de la Fuente (ARG)

13 November 2004
16:00

Netherlands	1–1	Germany
Hoog 46'	Report	Rinne 34'

Umpires:
Soledad Iparraguirre (ARG)
Mónica Rivera Fraga (ESP)

13 November 2004
18:15

Argentina	5–0	China
Gulla 9', 40'; Hernández 25'; Russo 58'; Rognoni 65'	Report

Umpires:
Lisa Roach (AUS)
Kazuko Yasueda (JPN)

=== Classification ===
==== Fifth and sixth place ====
14 November 2004
16:15

New Zealand	0–3	China
	Report	Wang 17'; Ma 30'; Zhou 56'

Umpires:
Corrine Cornelius (RSA)
Lisa Roach (AUS)

==== Third and fourth place ====
14 November 2004
18:45

Argentina	3–2	Australia
Rognoni 19', 48'; Aymar 54'	Report	Smith 8'; Faulkner 34'

Umpires:
Alison Hill (ENG)
Kazuko Yasueda (JPN)

==== Final ====
14 November 2004
21:15

Netherlands	2–0	Germany
Lammers 23'; Van As 39'	Report

Umpires:
Carolina de la Fuente (ARG)
Soledad Iparraguirre (ARG)

== Awards ==
Player of the Tournament	Top Goalscorer	Goalkeeper of the Tournament	Fair Play Trophy
(Argentina) Luciana Aymar	(Argentina) Alejandra Gulla	(Germany) Yvonne Frank	Argentina

== Statistics ==
=== Final standings ===
1. Netherlands
2. Germany
3. Argentina
4. Australia
5. China
6. New Zealand

=== Goalscorers ===
There were 54 goals scored in 18 matches, for an average of 3 goals per match.

6 goals

- (Argentina) Alejandra Gulla

4 goals

- (Netherlands) Kim Lammers

3 goals

- (Argentina) Soledad García
- (Argentina) Cecilia Rognoni
- (Australia) Suzie Faulkner

2 goals

- (Argentina) Luciana Aymar
- (Argentina) Vanina Oneto
- (Argentina) Mariné Russo
- (Australia) Nicole Arrold
- (Germany) Nadine Ernsting-Krienke
- (Netherlands) Maartje Scheepstra

1 goal

- (Argentina) María de la Paz Hernández
- (Australia) Hope Brown
- (Australia) Nikki Hudson
- (Australia) Karen Smith
- (China) Chen Qiuqi
- (China) Gao Lihua
- (China) Ma Yibo
- (China) Wang Yanhui
- (China) Zhou Wanfeng
- (Germany) Kerstin Hoyer
- (Germany) Natascha Keller
- (Germany) Anke Kühn
- (Germany) Fanny Rinne
- (Germany) Marion Rodewald
- (Germany) Christina Schütze
- (Netherlands) Chantal de Bruijn
- (Netherlands) Saskia Fuchs
- (Netherlands) Ellen Hoog
- (Netherlands) Fatima Moreira de Melo
- (Netherlands) Naomi van As
- (New Zealand) Tara Drysdale
- (New Zealand) Lizzy Igasan
- (New Zealand) Meredith Orr

Source: FIH
