= 2007 Women's Hockey Champions Trophy =

Field hockey tournament

Tournament details
- Host country: Argentina
- City: Quilmes
- Teams: 6
- Venue: Estadio Nacional de Hockey

Final positions
- Champions: Netherlands (5th title)
- Runner-up: Argentina
- Third place: Germany

Tournament statistics
- Matches played: 18
- Goals scored: 47 (2.61 per match)
- Top scorer: (Argentina) Noel Barrionuevo (5 goals)
- Best player: (Netherlands) Minke Booij

The 2007 Women's Hockey Champions Trophy was the 15th edition of the Hockey Champions Trophy for women. It was held on 13–21 January 2007 in Quilmes, Argentina.

The Netherlands won the tournament for the fifth time after defeating the hosts Argentina 1–0 in the final.

== Teams ==
Below are the teams that qualified for the tournament, as listed by International Hockey Federation (FIH):

- Germany (Defending champions and champions of 2004 Summer Olympics)
- Netherlands (Champions of 2006 World Cup)
- Argentina (Host nation)
- Australia (Runner-up in 2006 World Cup)
- Spain (Fourth in 2006 World Cup)
- Japan (Fifth in 2006 World Cup)

== Squads ==
Argentina

Head Coach: Gabriel Minadeo

3. Magdalena Aicega (c)
4. Rosario Luchetti
8. Luciana Aymar
9. Agustina Bouza
10. Soledad García
11. Carla Rebecchi
12. Mariana González Oliva
16. Daniela Maloberti
18. Paola Vukojicic (GK)
19. Mariné Russo
22. Gabriela Aguirre
24. Claudia Burkart
25. Silvina D'Elía
26. Giselle Kañevsky
27. Noel Barrionuevo
28. Belén Succi (GK)
29. Belen Rivas
30. Sofia Román
Australia

Head Coach: Frank Murray

3. Sarah O'Connor
5. Peta Gallagher
7. Kim Walker
9. Rebecca Sanders
10. Kate Hollywood
12. Madonna Blyth
13. Shelly Liddelow
15. Kobie McGurk
16. Fiona Johnson
18. Emma Meyer
21. De-Anne Gilbert (GK)
22. Amy Korner
23. Renee Trost
25. Melanie Twitt
27. Rachael Lynch (GK)
29. Teneal Attard
30. Sarah Taylor
31. Claire Messent
Germany

Head Coach: Michael Behrmann

1. Yvonne Frank (GK)
2. Tina Bachmann
3. Lydia Morgenstern
5. Nadine Ernsting-Krienke
6. Svenja Schuermann
11. Eileen Hoffmann
16. Fanny Rinne
19. Britta von Livonius
22. Janine Beermann
23. Silja Lorenzen
24. Maike Stöckel
26. Christina Schütze
27. Pia Eidmann
28. Julia Müller
29. Lina Geyer
30. Jennifer Plass
31. Julia Karwatzky
32. Kristina Reynolds (GK)
Japan

Head Coach: Yoo Seung-Jin

1. Rie Terazono (GK)
2. Ikuko Okamura
3. Mayumi Ono
4. Keiko Miura
5. Chie Kimura
6. Yukari Yamamoto
7. Rika Komazawa
8. Sakae Morimoto
9. Kaori Chiba
10. Tomomi Komori
11. Toshie Tsukui
12. Yuko Kitano
13. Sachimi Iwao
14. Akemi Kato (c)
15. Miyuki Nakagawa
16. Misaki Ozawa
17. Chinami Kozakura
21. Hikari Suwa
Netherlands

Head Coach: Marc Lammers

1. Lisanne de Roever (GK)
2. Mignonne Meekels
4. Fatima Moreira de Melo
5. Jiske Snoeks
8. Nienke Kremers
9. Wieke Dijkstra
11. Maartje Goderie
13. Minke Smabers
14. Minke Booij (c)
15. Janneke Schopman
16. Carlijn Welten
17. Maartje Paumen
18. Naomi van As
21. Sophie Polkamp
22. Floortje Engels (GK)
23. Kim Lammers
24. Eva de Goede
26. Michelle van der Pols
Spain

Head Coach: Pablo Usoz

1. María Jesús Rosa (GK)
2. Julia Menéndez
3. Rocío Ybarra
4. Gemma Bernad
7. Bárbara Malda
8. Marta Prat
9. Silvia Muñoz (c)
10. Silvia Bonastre
11. María Romagosa
12. Marta Ejarque
13. Raquel Huertas
14. Pilar Sánchez
17. Núria Camón
19. María López (GK)
20. Montse Cruz
21. Esther Termens
22. Gloria Comerma
23. Georgina Oliva

== Umpires ==
Below are the 8 umpires appointed by the International Hockey Federation to officiate matches in the tournament:

- Marelize de Klerk (RSA)
- Carolina de la Fuente (ARG)
- Miao Lin (CHN)
- Monica Rivera (ESP)
- Lisa Roach (AUS)
- Chieko Soma (JPN)
- Gina Spitaleri (ITA)
- Wendy Stewart (CAN)

== Results ==
All times are Argentina Time (UTC−03:00)

=== Pool ===
| Pos | Team | Pld | W | D | L | GF | GA | GD | Pts | Qualification |
|---|---|---|---|---|---|---|---|---|---|---|
| 1 | Netherlands | 5 | 4 | 1 | 0 | 11 | 2 | +9 | 13 | Final |
| 2 | Argentina | 5 | 4 | 0 | 1 | 12 | 5 | +7 | 12 | Final |
| 3 | Australia | 5 | 2 | 1 | 2 | 7 | 7 | 0 | 7 | |
| 4 | Germany | 5 | 2 | 1 | 2 | 5 | 6 | −1 | 7 | |
| 5 | Japan | 5 | 1 | 0 | 4 | 2 | 10 | −8 | 3 | |
| 6 | Spain | 5 | 0 | 1 | 4 | 5 | 12 | −7 | 1 | |

Source: FIH
Rules for classification: 1) points; 2) goal difference; 3) goals scored; 4) head-to-head result.

13 January 2007
15:00

| Netherlands | 3–1 | Spain |
|---|---|---|
| Welten 12'; Van As 40'; Lammers 64' | Report | Romagosa 47' |

Umpires:
Wendy Stewart (CAN)
Chieko Soma (JPN)

13 January 2007
17:15

| Japan | 0–3 | Australia |
|---|---|---|
| | Report | Trost 4'; Korner 47'; Gallagher 65' |

Umpires:
Miao Lin (CHN)
Carolina de la Fuente (ARG)

13 January 2007
20:15

| Argentina | 2–0 | Germany |
|---|---|---|
| Barrionuevo 9'; Maloberti 29' | Report |

Umpires:
Lisa Roach (AUS)
Monica Rivera (ESP)

14 January 2007
16:00

| Netherlands | 3–0 | Japan |
|---|---|---|
| Paumen 28'; Lammers 35'; Moreira de Melo 43' | Report |

Umpires:
Gina Spitaleri (ITA)
Monica Rivera (ESP)

14 January 2007
18:15

| Australia | 2–1 | Germany |
|---|---|---|
| Blyth 39'; Sanders 65' | Report | Schütze 35' |

Umpires:
Wendy Stewart (CAN)
Miao Lin (CHN)

14 January 2007
21:15

| Spain | 1–4 | Argentina |
|---|---|---|
| Termens 37' | Report | Maloberti 5'; Barrionuevo 13', 56'; Rebecchi 32' |

Umpires:
Chieko Soma (JPN)
Marelize de Klerk (RSA)

16 January 2007
16:00

| Spain | 2–2 | Australia |
|---|---|---|
| Ybarra 30'; Sánchez 47' | Report | Gallagher 10', 18' |

Umpires:
Carolina de la Fuente (ARG)
Gina Spitaleri (ITA)

16 January 2007
18:15

| Germany | 1–0 | Japan |
|---|---|---|
| Ernsting-Krienke 59' | Report |

Umpires:
Wendy Stewart (CAN)
Marelize de Klerk (RSA)

16 January 2007
21:15

| Argentina | 0–3 | Netherlands |
|---|---|---|
| | Report | Moreira de Melo 12'; Lammers 38', 56' |

Umpires:
Lisa Roach (AUS)
Chieko Soma (JPN)

18 January 2007
16:00

| Germany | 2–1 | Spain |
|---|---|---|
| Ernsting-Krienke 35'; Müller 50' | Report | Malda 68' |

Umpires:
Lisa Roach (AUS)
Miao Lin(CHN)

18 January 2007
18:15

| Australia | 0–1 | Netherlands |
|---|---|---|
| | Report | De Goede 18' |

Umpires:
Carolina de la Fuente (ARG)
Marelize de Klerk (RSA)

18 January 2007
21:15

| Japan | 1–3 | Argentina |
|---|---|---|
| Morimoto 65' | Report | Barrionuevo 32'; Russo 40'; Rebecchi 46' |

Umpires:
Gina Spitaleri (ITA)
Monica Rivera (ESP)

20 January 2007
13:15

| Netherlands | 1–1 | Germany |
|---|---|---|
| Van der Pols 31' | Report | Ernsting-Krienke 68' |

Umpires:
Chieko Soma (JPN)
Monica Rivera (ESP)

20 January 2007
15:30

| Spain | 0–1 | Japan |
|---|---|---|
| | Report | Tsukui 1' |

Umpires:
Carolina de la Fuente (ARG)
Lisa Roach (AUS)

20 January 2007
17:45

| Argentina | 3–0 | Australia |
|---|---|---|
| Barrionuevo 34'; Maloberti 42'; Bouza 62' | Report |

Umpires:
Marelize de Klerk (RSA)
Gina Spitaleri (ITA)

=== Classification ===
==== Fifth and sixth place ====
21 January 2007
15:45

| Japan | 2–0 | Spain |
|---|---|---|
| Komazawa 48', 57' | Report |

Umpires:
Wendy Stewart (CAN)
Miao Lin (CHN)

==== Third and fourth place ====
21 January 2007
18:30

| Australia | 0–2 | Germany |
|---|---|---|
| | Report | Beermann 9'; Lorenzen 51' |

Umpires:
Gina Spitaleri (ITA)
Carolina de la Fuente (ARG)

==== Final ====
21 January 2007
21:15

| Netherlands | 1–0 | Argentina |
|---|---|---|
| Paumen 3' | Report |

Estadio Nacional de Hockey, Quilmes
Umpires:
Marelize de Klerk (RSA)
Lisa Roach (AUS)

Team details

Netherlands
Argentina

| GK | 1 | Lisanne de Roever |
| DF | 13 | Minke Smabers |
| DF | 14 | Minke Booij (c) |
| DF | 15 | Janneke Schopman |
| DF | 21 | Sophie Polkamp |
| MF | 4 | Fatima Moreira |
| MF | 9 | Wieke Dijkstra |
| MF | 17 | Maartje Paumen |
| MF | 18 | Naomi van As |
| FW | 5 | Jiske Snoeks |
| FW | 23 | Kim Lammers |
Substitutions:
| DF | 2 | Mignonne Meekels | (substituted on) 51' |
| MF | 8 | Nienke Kremers | (substituted on) 17' |
| FW | 16 | Carlijn Welten | (substituted on) 14' |
| MF | 24 | Eva de Goede | (substituted on) 12' |
| MF | 26 | Michelle van der Pols | (substituted on) 22' |
Manager:
(Netherlands) Marc Lammers

| GK | 18 | Paola Vukojicic |
| DF | 24 | Claudia Burkart |
| DF | 3 | Magdalena Aicega (c) |
| DF | 26 | Giselle Kañevsky |
| DF | 27 | Noel Barrionuevo |
| MF | 8 | Luciana Aymar (c) | 61' |
| MF | 16 | Daniela Maloberti |
| MF | 19 | Mariné Russo |
| MF | 12 | Mariana González Oliva |
| FW | 10 | Soledad García |
| FW | 11 | Carla Rebecchi |
Substitutions:
| MF | 4 | Rosario Luchetti | | (substituted on) 17' |
| FW | 9 | Agustina Bouza | | (substituted on) 19' |
| MF | 22 | Gabriela Aguirre | | (substituted on) 13' |
Manager:
(Argentina) Gabriel Minadeo

== Awards ==
| Top Goalscorer | Player of the Tournament | Goalkeeper of the Tournament | Fair Play Trophy |
|---|---|---|---|
| (Argentina) Noel Barrionuevo | (Netherlands) Minke Booij | (Netherlands) Lisanne de Roever | Argentina |

== Statistics ==
=== Final standings ===
1. Netherlands
2. Argentina
3. Germany
4. Australia
5. Japan
6. Spain

=== Goalscorers ===
There were 47 goals scored in 18 matches, for an average of 2.61 goals per match.

5 goals

- (Argentina) Noel Barrionuevo

4 goals

- (Netherlands) Kim Lammers

3 goals

- (Argentina) Daniela Maloberti
- (Australia) Peta Gallagher
- (Germany) Nadine Ernsting-Krienke

2 goals

- (Argentina) Carla Rebecchi
- (Japan) Rika Komazawa
- (Netherlands) Fatima Moreira de Melo
- (Netherlands) Maartje Paumen

1 goal

- (Argentina) Agustina Bouza
- (Argentina) Mariné Russo
- (Australia) Madonna Blyth
- (Australia) Amy Korner
- (Australia) Renee Trost
- (Australia) Rebecca Sanders
- (Germany) Janine Beermann
- (Germany) Silja Lorenzen
- (Germany) Julia Müller
- (Germany) Christina Schütze
- (Japan) Sakae Morimoto
- (Japan) Toshie Tsukui
- (Netherlands) Eva de Goede
- (Netherlands) Naomi van As
- (Netherlands) Michelle van der Pols
- (Netherlands) Carlijn Welten
- (Spain) Bárbara Malda
- (Spain) María Romagosa
- (Spain) Pilar Sánchez
- (Spain) Esther Termens
- (Spain) Rocío Ybarra

Source: FIH
