= 2006 Champions Trophy (disambiguation) =

The 2006 Champions Trophy usually refers to the 2006 ICC Champions Trophy, a 10-team cricket tournament at various venues in India.

The 2006 Champions Trophy may also refer to:

- 2006 Men's Hockey Champions Trophy, a 6-team field hockey tournament in Terrassa, Spain
- 2006 Women's Hockey Champions Trophy, a 6-team field hockey tournament in Amstelveen, Netherlands
