= Eveline de Haan =

Dutch field hockey player

Personal information
- Born: 21 February 1976 (age 50) Nijmegen
Medal record
Women's field hockey
Representing the Netherlands
World Cup
| Gold medal – first place | 2006 Madrid | Team competition |
Champions Trophy
| Gold medal – first place | 2000 Amstelveen | Team competition |
| Gold medal – first place | 2004 Rosario | Team competition |
| Bronze medal – third place | 2003 Sydney | Team competition |
| Bronze medal – third place | 2006 Amstelveen | Team competition |
European Championship
| Gold medal – first place | 1999 Cologne | Team competition |

Eveline de Haan (born 21 February 1976) is a Dutch retired field hockey player who played for HC Klein Zwitserland and NMHC Nijmegen. De Haan was a member of the Netherlands squad that became world champions at the 2006 Women's Hockey World Cup. She earned a total of 30 caps for the national team.
