= Mignonne Meekels =

Dutch field hockey player

Medal record

Women's field hockey

Representing the Netherlands

Champions Trophy
Gold medal – first place	2004 Rosario	Team competition
Gold medal – first place	2005 Canberra	Team competition
Gold medal – first place	2007 Quilmes	Team competition

Mignonne Meekels (born 7 June 1986, Rotterdam) is a Dutch field hockey player, who plays as a defender for Dutch club HC Rotterdam. She also plays for the Netherlands national team and was part of the Dutch squad that became 2007 Champions Trophy winner.

== Bibliography ==
- (in Dutch) Profile
