= Lisanne de Roever =

Dutch field hockey player

Medal record

Women's field hockey

Representing the Netherlands

Olympic Games
Gold medal – first place	2008 Beijing	Team competition
Silver medal – second place	2004 Athens	Team competition

World Championship
Gold medal – first place	2006 Madrid	Team competition
Silver medal – second place	2002 Perth	Team competition

European Championship
Gold medal – first place	2005 Dublin	Team competition
Silver medal – second place	2007 Manchester	Team competition

Champions Trophy
Gold medal – first place	2004 Rosario	Team competition
Gold medal – first place	2005 Canberra	Team competition
Gold medal – first place	2007 Quilmes	Team competition
Silver medal – second place	2001 Amstelveen	Team competition
Bronze medal – third place	2003 Sydney	Team competition
Bronze medal – third place	2006 Amstelveen	Team competition
Bronze medal – third place	2008 M'gladbach	Team competition

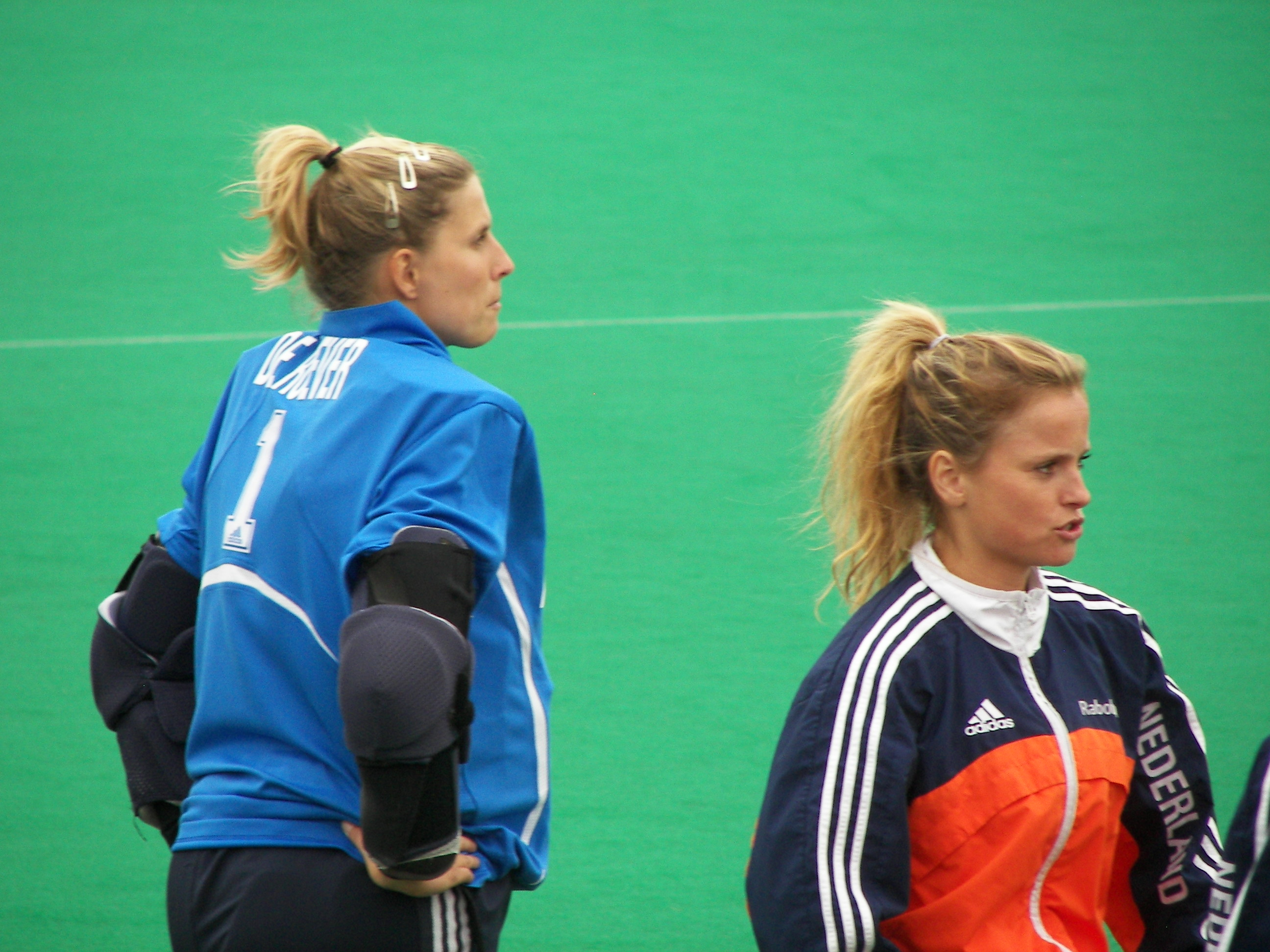
Lisanne de Roever and Fatima Moreira de Melo

Lisanne Freya de Roever (born 6 June 1979 in Amstelveen, North Holland) is a Dutch field hockey player who plays as a goalkeeper for Dutch club SV Kampong. She made her debut for the Netherlands national team on 5 March 2005 in a friendly match against Malaysia.

De Roever was a member of the Dutch squad that won the silver medal at the 2004 Summer Olympics in Athens. She was also part of the squad that became World Champion at the 2006 Women's Hockey World Cup and which won the 2007 Champions Trophy.

At the 2008 Summer Olympics in Beijing she won an Olympic gold medal with the Dutch national team beating China in the final 2–0.
