= Florencia D'Elía =

Argentine field hockey player

Personal information
- Full name: María Florencia D'Elía
- Born: 7 November 1981 (age 44) Mendoza, Argentina

Sport
- Sport: Field hockey
- Position: Midfield
Senior career
Years	Team	Caps	Goals
–	Marista	-	-
National team
Years	Team	Caps	Goals
2000–2001	Argentina U–21	14	(3)
2005–2006	Argentina	42	(2)
Medal record
Women's field hockey
Representing Argentina
FIH World Cup
Bronze medal – third place	2006 Madrid	Team
South American Games
Gold medal – first place	2006 Buenos Aires	Team
FIH Junior World Cup
Silver medal – second place	2001 Buenos Aires	Team
Pan American Junior Championship
Gold medal – first place	2000 Bridgetown	Team

María Florencia D'Elía (born 7 November 1981) is a former field hockey player from Argentina.

== Personal life ==
D'Elía was born in Mendoza, Argentina.

Her younger sister, Silvina, is also a former international field hockey player of Las Leonas.

== Career ==
=== Under–21 ===
In 2001, D'Elía was a member of the silver medal-winning Argentina U–21 squad at the FIH Junior World Cup in Buenos Aires.

=== Las Leonas ===
D'Elía spent two years in the national squad in 2005 and 2006.

She made her senior international debut for Las Leonas in 2005, during a test series against South Africa in Buenos Aires. She later went on to appear at the 2005 FIH Champions Trophy in Canberra.

In 2006, she continued representing the national squad, winning two medals. She took home gold at the South American Games in Buenos Aires, and bronze at the FIH World Cup in Madrid. She also made appearances at her second FIH Champions Trophy in Amstelveen, as well as the March on Madrid Tournament in the United States.

She announced her retirement from international hockey in 2007, citing lack of support within the national squad setup.

== International goals ==
The following is a list of goals scored by D'Elía during her international career.

Goal	Date	Location	Opponent	Score	Result	Competition	Ref.
1	27 November 2005	National Hockey Centre, Canberra, Australia	China	2–0	3–0	2005 FIH Champions Trophy	
2	14 November 2006	CeNARD, Buenos Aires, Argentina	Chile	2–0	6–0	VIII South American Games	
