= Silke Müller =

German field hockey player

Personal information
- Born: 11 November 1978 (age 47)
Medal record
Women's field hockey
Representing Germany
Olympic Games
| Gold medal – first place | 2004 Athens | Team competition |
Champions Challenge
| Gold medal – first place | 2003 Catania | Team competition |

Silke Müller (born 11 November 1978) is a field hockey midfielder from Germany, who won the gold medal with the German National Women's Team at the 2004 Summer Olympics in Athens, Greece.

== (Senior) National Team achievements ==
- 2000 – European Indoor Nations Cup, Vienna (1st place)
- 2002 – World Cup, Perth (7th place)
- 2003 – Champions Challenge, Catania (1st place)
- 2003 – European Nations Cup, Barcelona (3rd place)
- 2004 – Olympic Qualifier, Auckland (4th place)
- 2004 – Summer Olympics, Athens (1st place)
- 2004 – Champions Trophy, Rosario (2nd place)
- 2005 – European Nations Cup, Dublin (2nd place)
- 2005 – Champions Trophy, Canberra (5th place)
- 2006 – European Indoor Nations Cup, Eindhoven (1st place)
- 2006 – Champions Trophy, Amstelveen (1st place)
- 2006 – World Cup, Madrid (8th)

== (Senior) club achievements ==
- 1997 – German Indoor Hockey League (1st place)
- 2001 – German Field Hockey League (1st place)
- 2002 – German Indoor Hockey League (1st place)
- 2002 – European Indoor Hockey Cup (1st place)
- 2003 – German Indoor Hockey League (1st place)
- 2003 – European Indoor Hockey Cup (1st place)
- 2004 – German Indoor Hockey League (1st place)
- 2004 – European Indoor Hockey Cup (1st place)
- 2004 – German Field Hockey League (1st place)
- 2005 – German Indoor Hockey League (1st place)
- 2005 – European Indoor Hockey Cup (1st place)
- 2006 – Dutch Indoor Hockey League (1st place)
