= Michelle van der Pols =

Dutch field hockey player

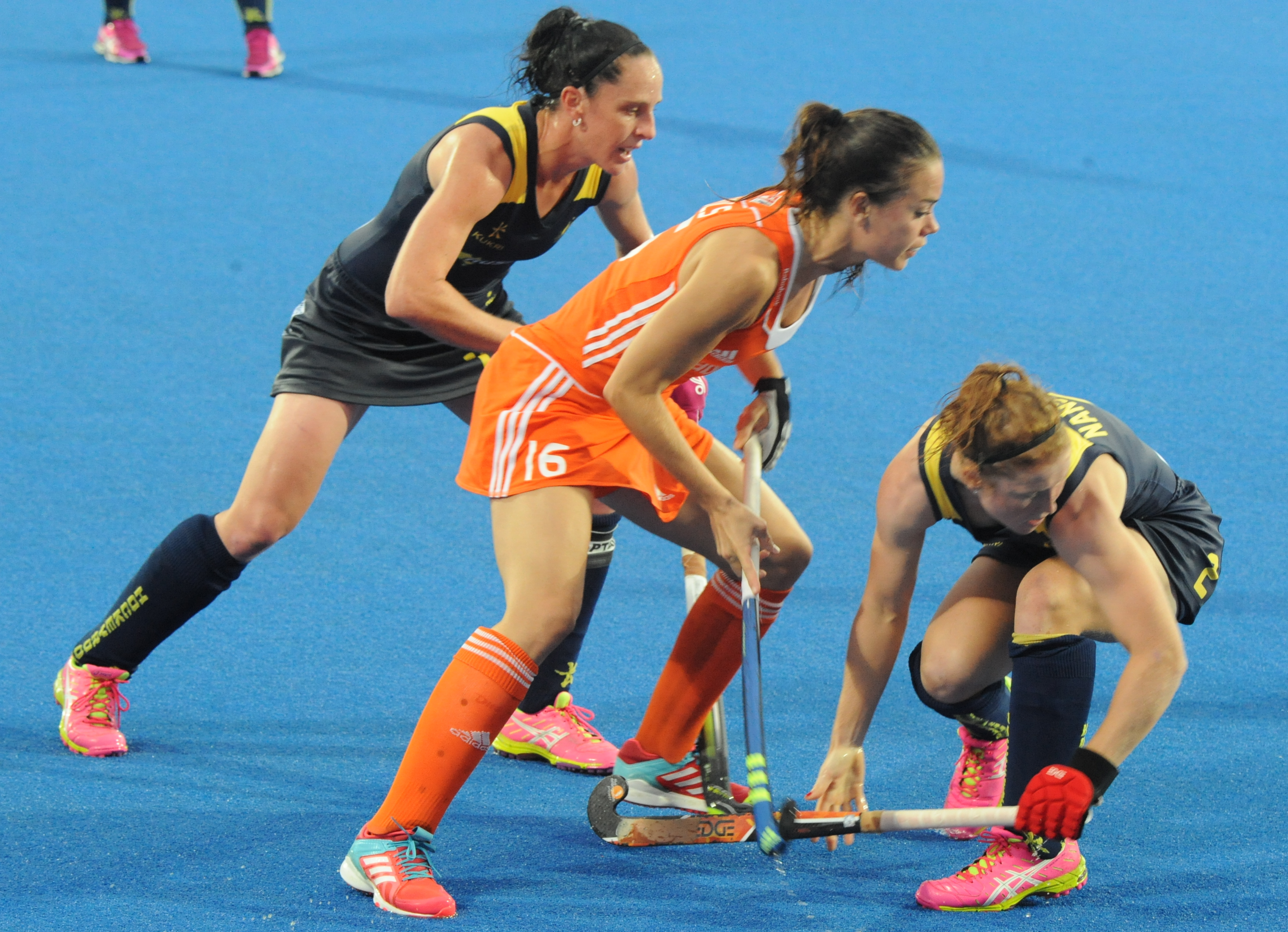

Personal information
- Born: January 6, 1989 (age 37) Utrecht, Netherlands
Medal record
Women's field hockey
Representing the Netherlands
World Cup
Silver medal – second place	2010 Rosario	Team
Champions Trophy
Gold medal – first place	2007 Quilmes	Team
Bronze medal – third place	2008 M'gladbach	Team
Bronze medal – third place	2014 Mendoza	Team

Michelle van der Pols (born 6 January 1989) is a Dutch field hockey midfielder for Dutch club SV Kampong. She also plays for the Netherlands national team and she was part of the Dutch squad that became the 2007 Champions Trophy winner.

Van der Pols also was a member of the Netherlands' 2010 Women's Hockey World Cup team, where the defending champions Netherlands lost in the final to Argentina.
