= Leonoor Voskamp =

Dutch field hockey player (born 1983)

Personal information
- Born: 20 August 1983 (age 42)
Medal record
Women's field hockey
Representing the Netherlands
Champions Trophy
| Gold medal – first place | 2004 Rosario | Team competition |
| Gold medal – first place | 2005 Canberra | Team competition |

Leonoor Voskamp (born 20 August 1983) is a Dutch field hockey player, who made her debut for the Dutch National Women's Team on 20 June 2003 during a six-nations tournament in Busan, South Korea. She played for the Dutch hockey club HC Klein Zwitserland from The Hague.
