= Luciana Aymar =

Argentine field hockey player

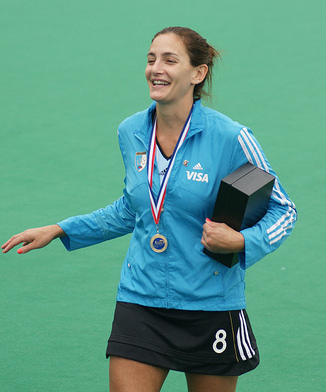
- Aymar in 2010

Personal information
- Full name: Luciana Paula Aymar
- Born: 10 August 1977 (age 49) Rosario, Argentina
- Height: 1.72 m (5 ft 8 in)

Sport
- Sport: Field hockey
- Position: Midfielder
Youth career
- Team
- –: Fisherton
- –: Jockey Club de Rosario
Senior career
Years	Team	Caps	Goals
1998	Rot-Weiss Köln	-	-
1999	Real Club de Polo	-	-
2000–2007	Quilmes	-	-
2008–2011	GEBA	-	-
National team
Years	Team	Caps	Goals
1994–1998	Argentina U21		-
1998–2014	Argentina	376	(162)
Medal record
Women's field hockey
Representing Argentina
Olympic Games
Silver medal – second place	2000 Sydney	Team
Silver medal – second place	2012 London	Team
Bronze medal – third place	2004 Athens	Team
Bronze medal – third place	2008 Beijing	Team
World Cup
Gold medal – first place	2002 Perth	Team
Gold medal – first place	2010 Rosario	Team
Bronze medal – third place	2006 Madrid	Team
Bronze medal – third place	2014 The Hague	Team
Champions Trophy
Gold medal – first place	2001 Amstelveen	Team
Gold medal – first place	2008 Mönchengladbach	Team
Gold medal – first place	2009 Sydney	Team
Gold medal – first place	2010 Nottingham	Team
Gold medal – first place	2012 Rosario	Team
Gold medal – first place	2014 Mendoza	Team
Silver medal – second place	2002 Macau	Team
Silver medal – second place	2007 Quilmes	Team
Silver medal – second place	2011 Amstelveen	Team
Bronze medal – third place	2004 Rosario	Team
Pan American Games
Gold medal – first place	1999 Winnipeg	Team
Gold medal – first place	2003 Santo Domingo	Team
Gold medal – first place	2007 Rio de Janeiro	Team
Silver medal – second place	2011 Guadalajara	Team
Pan American Cup
Gold medal – first place	2001 Kingston	Team
Gold medal – first place	2004 Bridgetown	Team
Gold medal – first place	2013 Mendoza	Team
Junior World Cup
Bronze medal – third place	1997 Seongnam	Team

Luciana Paula Aymar (Spanish pronunciation: [luˈsjana ajˈmaɾ]; born 10 August 1977) is an Argentine retired field hockey player and national team captain. She is the only player in history to receive the FIH Player of the Year Award eight times, and is considered the best female hockey player of all time. In 2010 she was granted the Platinum Konex Award as the best hockey player of the last decade in Argentina.

Luciana is known for her ability to beat opposing players using her pace and dribbling skills, drawing comparisons with Argentine footballer Diego Maradona. That is what has earned her the nickname "La Maga" ("The Magician") and "The Maradona of Field Hockey".

Aymar was the flag bearer for Argentina at the 2012 Summer Olympics, becoming the second Argentine field hockey athlete being honoured this way after Marcelo Garraffo.

== Career ==
Luciana started playing at age seven for Club Atlético Fisherton in her native Rosario. She moved to Jockey Club de Rosario six years later. She gradually began training with the junior national team, for which she had to travel every day to Buenos Aires. In her international career she played for Rot Weiss Köln from Germany and for Real Club de Barcelona from Spain. In her country, Luciana played for Quilmes Atlético Club and GEBA, where she won La Liga Nacional (The National League) and the Torneo Metropolitano. In 1997 she was part of the Argentina junior team that won the Pan American Games Junior Championship and the bronze medal at the Hockey Junior World Cup and a year later she made her debut for the Argentina senior team, finishing fourth at the 1998 Hockey World Cup. She was the youngest Argentine to be accepted into the squad when she was just 16.

Aymar was part of a generation in Argentine field hockey that went on to win several international tournaments from the 1999 Pan American Games onwards, including four Olympic medals, and six Champions Trophies. She was part of the squad that won the 2002 and 2010 Hockey World Cup, with the latter being held in her hometown Rosario.

She is the only player in history to receive the FIH Player of the Year Award eight times, and is considered as the best female hockey player of all time. In 2010 she was granted the Platinum Konex Award as the best hockey player of the last decade in Argentina.

== Personal life ==
Aymar was born to René Aymar and Nilda Vicente de Aymar. She has three siblings. Since 2017, Aymar had been in a relationship with former Chilean professional tennis player Fernando González, and they have two children: a son born in 2019, and a daughter born in 2021.

== Awards and honours ==
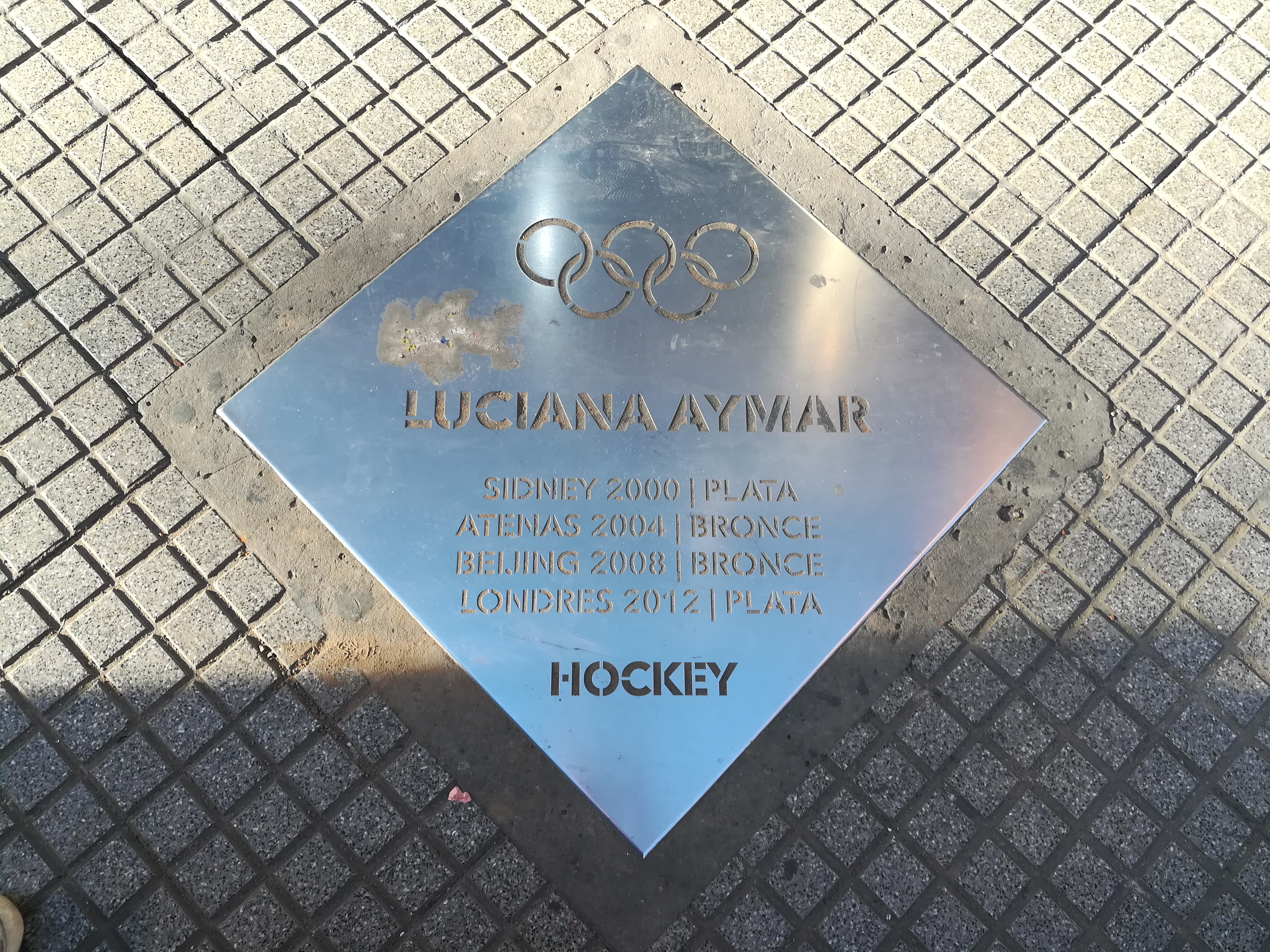
Olympic Walk on Pellegrini Avenue in Rosario, Santa Fe Province, Argentina

=== International ===
Argentina Junior

- Pan American Games: Gold Medal (1997)
- Junior World Cup: Bronze Medal (1997)

Argentina

- Pan American Games: Gold Medal (1999, 2003, 2007), Silver Medal (2011)
- Summer Olympics: Silver Medal (2000, 2012), Bronze Medal (2004, 2008).
- Champions Trophy: Gold Medal (2001, 2008, 2009, 2010, 2012, 2014), Silver Medal (2002, 2007, 2011), Bronze Medal (2004)
- World Cup: Gold Medal (2002, 2010), Bronze Medal (2006, 2014)

=== Club ===
Rot-Weiss Köln

- European Club Championship: 1998

Real Club de Polo de Barcelona

- Copa de la Reina: 2004

GEBA

- Liga Nacional: 2008, 2009
- Torneo Metropolitano: 2008, 2009

=== Individual ===
- Champions Trophy's Player of the Tournament: 2000, 2001, 2003, 2004, 2005, 2008, 2010, 2012, 2014
- FIH Player of the Year: 2001, 2004, 2005, 2007, 2008, 2009, 2010, 2013
- World Cup's Player of the Tournament: 2002, 2010
- Nominated for 2026 Princess of Asturias Prize in Sport (Premio Princesa de Asturias), but lost out to fellow Argentine Lionel Messi

=== Public image and legacy ===
Luciana Aymar has received extensive media coverage in Argentina, Chile and around the world. A 2016 documentary film titled "Lucha: Playing the Impossible" tells the story of her development and her successes as a field hockey star, first in Argentina and then on the world stage. The title is a play on words: Lucha is both Luciana's nickname as well as the Spanish word for "fight".

In the city of Rosario, Argentina, Luciana Aymar's hometown, there is a stadium—designed for field hockey and with a seating capacity of 12,000 spectators—named "Estadio Mundialista Luciana Aymar." The stadium was built for the purpose of hosting the 2010 Women's Field Hockey World Cup.

She currently lives in Chile with her husband and two children.

Awards
Preceded by (Australia) Alyson Annan	FIH Player of the Year; 2001	Succeeded by (Argentina) Cecilia Rognoni
Preceded by (Netherlands) Mijntje Donners	FIH Player of the Year; 2004–2005	Succeeded by (Netherlands) Minke Booij
Preceded by (Netherlands) Minke Booij	FIH Player of the Year; 2007–2010	Succeeded by (Netherlands) Maartje Paumen
Preceded by (Netherlands) Maartje Paumen	FIH Player of the Year; 2013	Succeeded by (Netherlands) Ellen Hoog
Preceded by Juan Martín del Potro	Olimpia de Oro; 2010	Succeeded by Lionel Messi
Olympic Games
Preceded by Manu Ginóbili	Flagbearer for Argentina; London 2012	Succeeded by Luis Scola
