= Floortje Engels =

Dutch field hockey player (born 1982)

Personal information
- Born: 15 February 1982 (age 44)
- Height: 1.72 m (5 ft 7 1/2 in)
- Weight: 70 kg (154 lb)

Sport
- Country: Netherlands
- Sport: Hockey
Medal record
Women's field hockey
Representing the Netherlands
World Cup
Silver medal – second place	2010 Rosario	Team
European Championship
Gold medal – first place	2011 Gladbach	Team competition
Silver medal – second place	2007 Manchester	Team competition
Champions Trophy
Gold medal – first place	2005 Canberra	Team competition
Gold medal – first place	2007 Quilmes	Team competition
Bronze medal – third place	2012 Rosario	Team

Floortje Engels (born 15 February 1982 in Amersfoort) is a Dutch field hockey player, who plays as a goalkeeper for Dutch club Amsterdam HBC. She also plays for the Netherlands national team and was part of the Dutch squad that became 2007 Champions Trophy winner.
