= Jiske Snoeks =

Dutch field hockey player (born 1978)

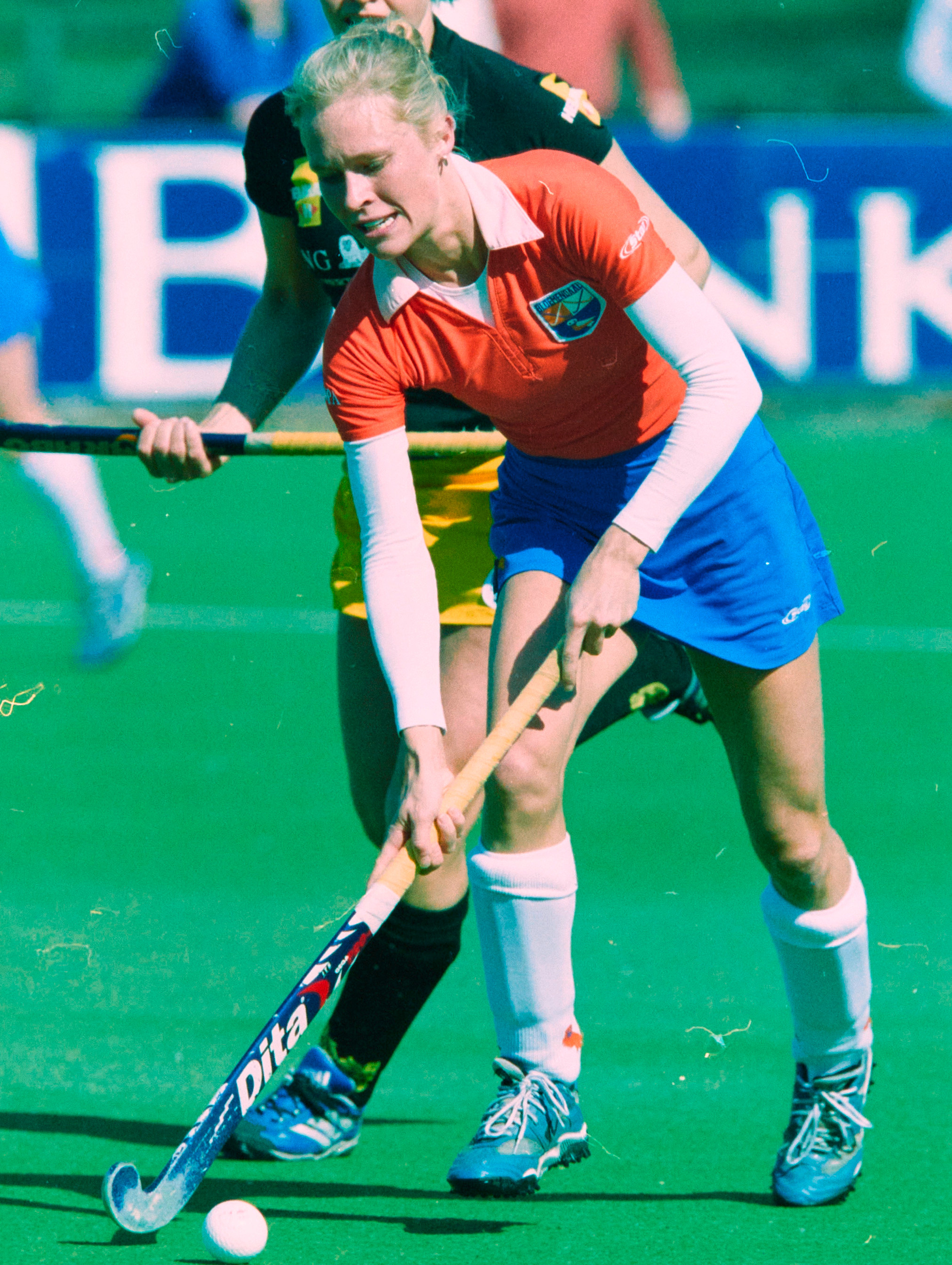
- Snoeks in action against South Korea at the 2003 Champions Trophy (March 2003)

Personal information
- Born: 19 May 1978 (age 48) Haarlem, North Holland
Medal record
Women's field hockey
Representing the Netherlands
Olympic Games
| Silver medal – second place | 2004 Athens | Team competition |
European Championship
| Silver medal – second place | 2007 Manchester | Team competition |
Champions Trophy
| Gold medal – first place | 2005 Canberra | Team competition |
| Gold medal – first place | 2007 Quilmes | Team competition |
| Bronze medal – third place | 2003 Sydney | Team competition |

Jiske Snoeks (born 19 May 1978 in Haarlem, North Holland) is a Dutch field hockey player who plays as a forward for Dutch club Amsterdam. She also plays for the Netherlands national team.

Snoeks was a member of the Dutch squad that won the silver medal at the 2004 Summer Olympics in Athens. She was also part of the Dutch squad that became world champions at the 2006 Women's Hockey World Cup and which won the 2007 Champions Trophy.
