= Marc Lammers =

Dutch field hockey player and coach

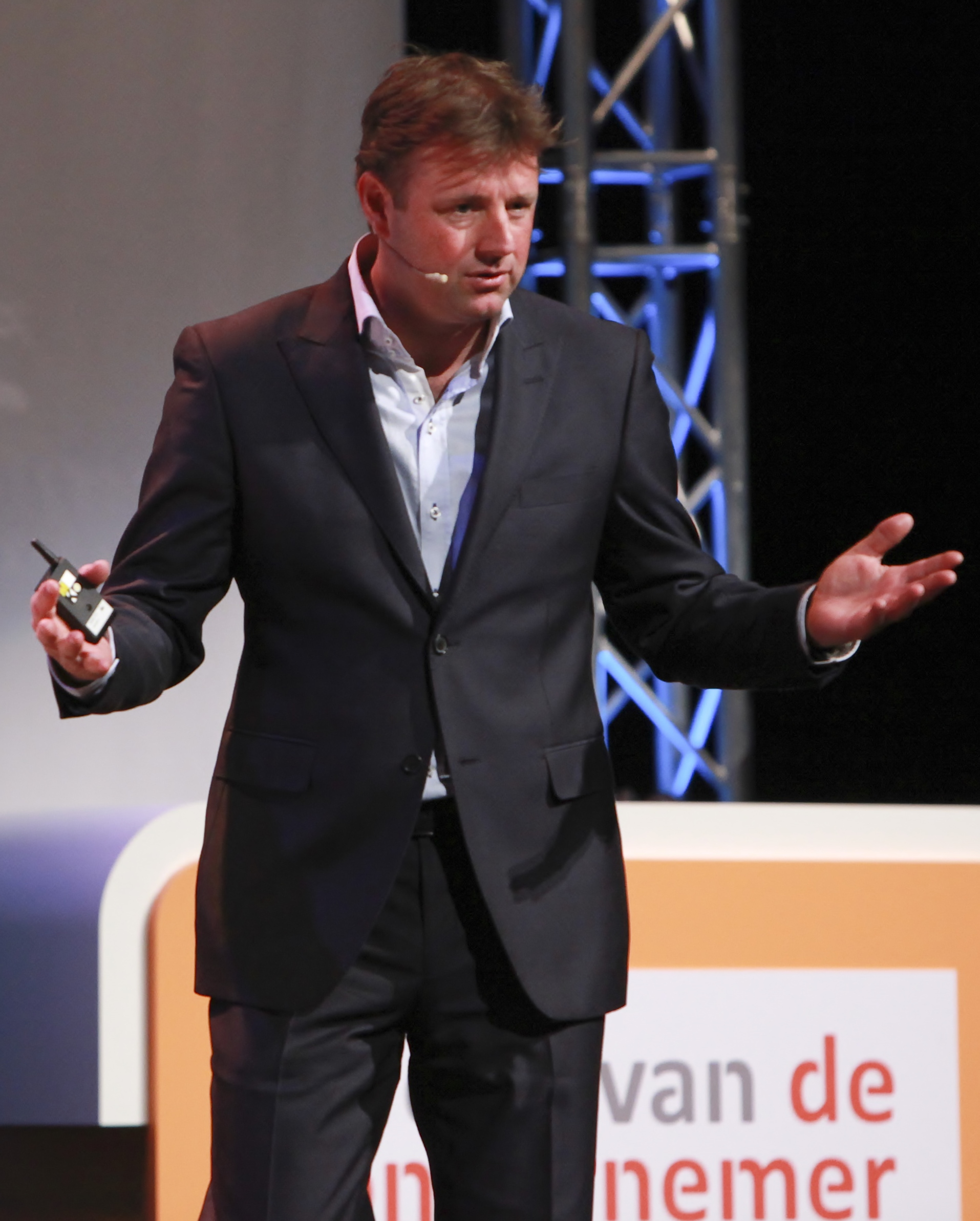
Lammers in 2011

Marc Lammers (born 15 March 1969 in Oss, North Brabant) is a Dutch former field hockey player and head coach. In the past, he led the Spanish women's national team from 1999 to 2000 and the Dutch women's national team from 2000 to 2008. Under his guidance, the Dutch team won the silver medal at the 2004 Summer Olympics in Athens, Greece, and gold at the 2008 Summer Olympics in Beijing, China. Later he also coached the Belgian men's national team until 2014, with whom he became European vice-champion. As a player, he earned five caps for the men's team. Lammers played for sixteen years in the Netherlands' first division, Hoofdklasse, with HC Den Bosch, HC Tilburg and Oranje Zwart.

== Achievements as Dutch coach ==
- 2001 Champions Trophy – Silver
- 2002 Champions Trophy – Bronze
- 2002 World Cup – Silver
- 2003 European Nations Cup – Gold
- 2003 Champions Trophy – Bronze
- 2004 Summer Olympics – Silver
- 2004 Champions Trophy – Gold
- 2005 European Nations Cup – Gold
- 2005 Champions Trophy – Gold
- 2006 Champions Trophy – Bronze
- 2006 World Cup – Gold
- 2007 Champions Trophy – Gold
- 2008 Champions Trophy – Bronze
- 2008 Summer Olympics – Gold

== Achievements as Belgian coach ==
• 2013 European Nations Cup – Silver
