= Eva de Goede =

Dutch field hockey player

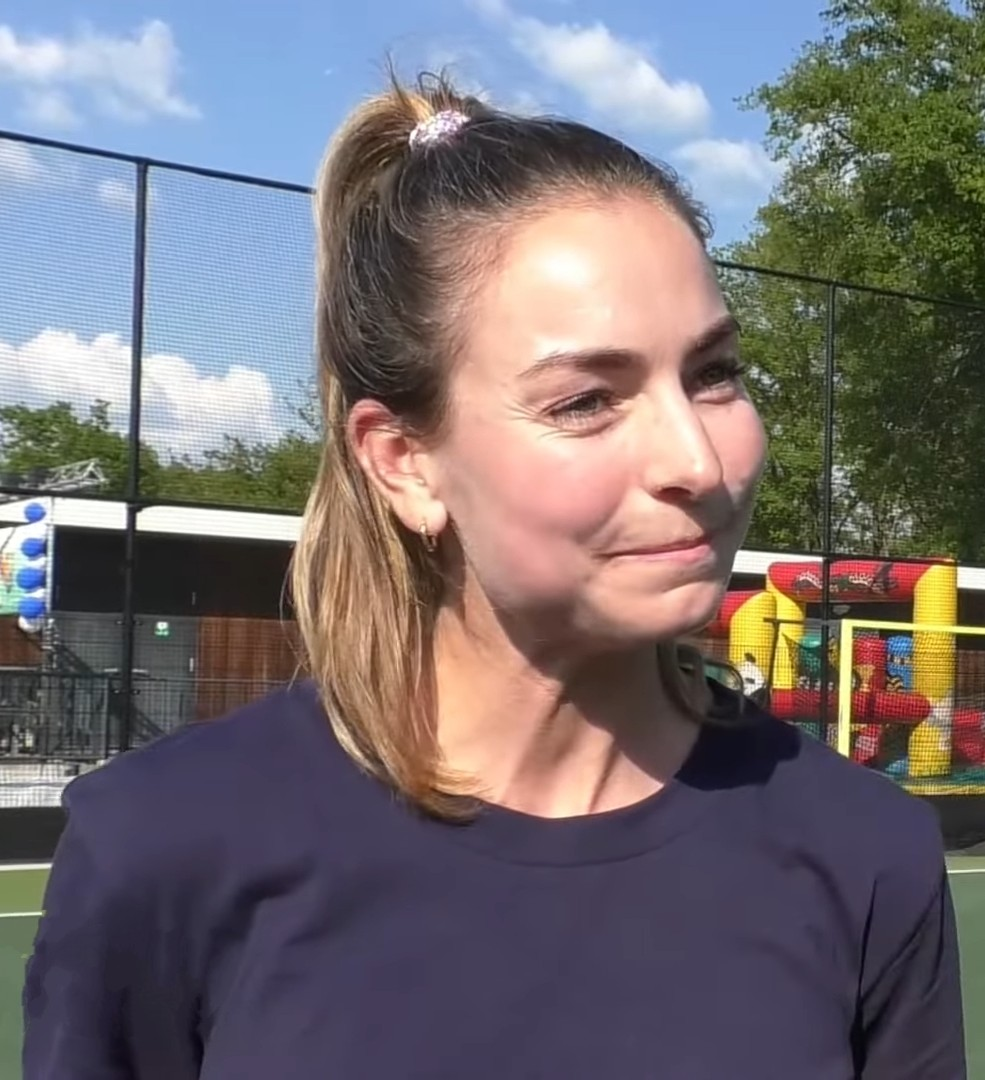
- De Goede in 2023

Personal information
- Full name: Eva Roma Maria Drummond
- Born: Eva Roma Maria de Goede; 23 March 1989 (age 37) Zeist, Netherlands
- Height: 1.68 m (5 ft 6 in)
- Weight: 61 kg (134 lb)

Sport
- Sport: Field hockey
- Position: Midfielder
- Club: HGC Wassenaar
National team
Years	Team	Caps	Goals
2006–	Netherlands	266	(24)
Medal record
Women's field hockey
Representing Netherlands
Olympic Games
Gold medal – first place	2008 Beijing	Team
Gold medal – first place	2012 London	Team
Gold medal – first place	2020 Tokyo	Team
Silver medal – second place	2016 Rio de Janeiro	Team
World Cup
Gold medal – first place	2014 The Hague
Gold medal – first place	2018 London
Gold medal – first place	2022 Terrassa/Amstelveen
Silver medal – second place	2010 Rosario
European Championship
Gold medal – first place	2009 Amstelveen
Gold medal – first place	2011 Gladbach
Gold medal – first place	2019 Antwerp
Gold medal – first place	2021 Amstelveen
Silver medal – second place	2015 London
Bronze medal – third place	2013 Boom
Champions Trophy
Gold medal – first place	2007 Quilmes
Gold medal – first place	2011 Amstelveen
Gold medal – first place	2018 Changzhou
Silver medal – second place	2010 Nottingham
Silver medal – second place	2016 London
Bronze medal – third place	2006 Amstelveen
Bronze medal – third place	2008 M'gladbach
Bronze medal – third place	2009 Sydney
Bronze medal – third place	2012 Rosario
Bronze medal – third place	2014 Mendoza

Eva Roma Maria Drummond (née de Goede, born 23 March 1989) is a Dutch field hockey player and triple Olympic champion, having played in the Dutch teams that won the gold medals in the 2008, 2012 and 2020 Summer Olympics. She also won a silver medal at the 2016 Summer Olympics. She was part of the Dutch squad that won the 2007 Champions Trophy.

She played as a midfielder for Dutch club AH&BC from 2010 until 2021, when she moved to HGC. At the 2018 Hockey Stars Awards, she was named the FIH Player of the Year. In February 2020 she was awarded the FIH Player of the Year for the second time in a row.

In 2022, she married South African field hockey player Tim Drummond.

She was not chosen for the Dutch hockey team for the 2024 Summer Olympics in Paris. This marked the end of her international career, during which she became number two in the Dutch all-time appearances with 266 international hockey matches played.

Preceded by Delfina Merino	FIH Player of the Year; 2018–2019	Most recent
