= Sophie Polkamp =

Dutch field hockey player

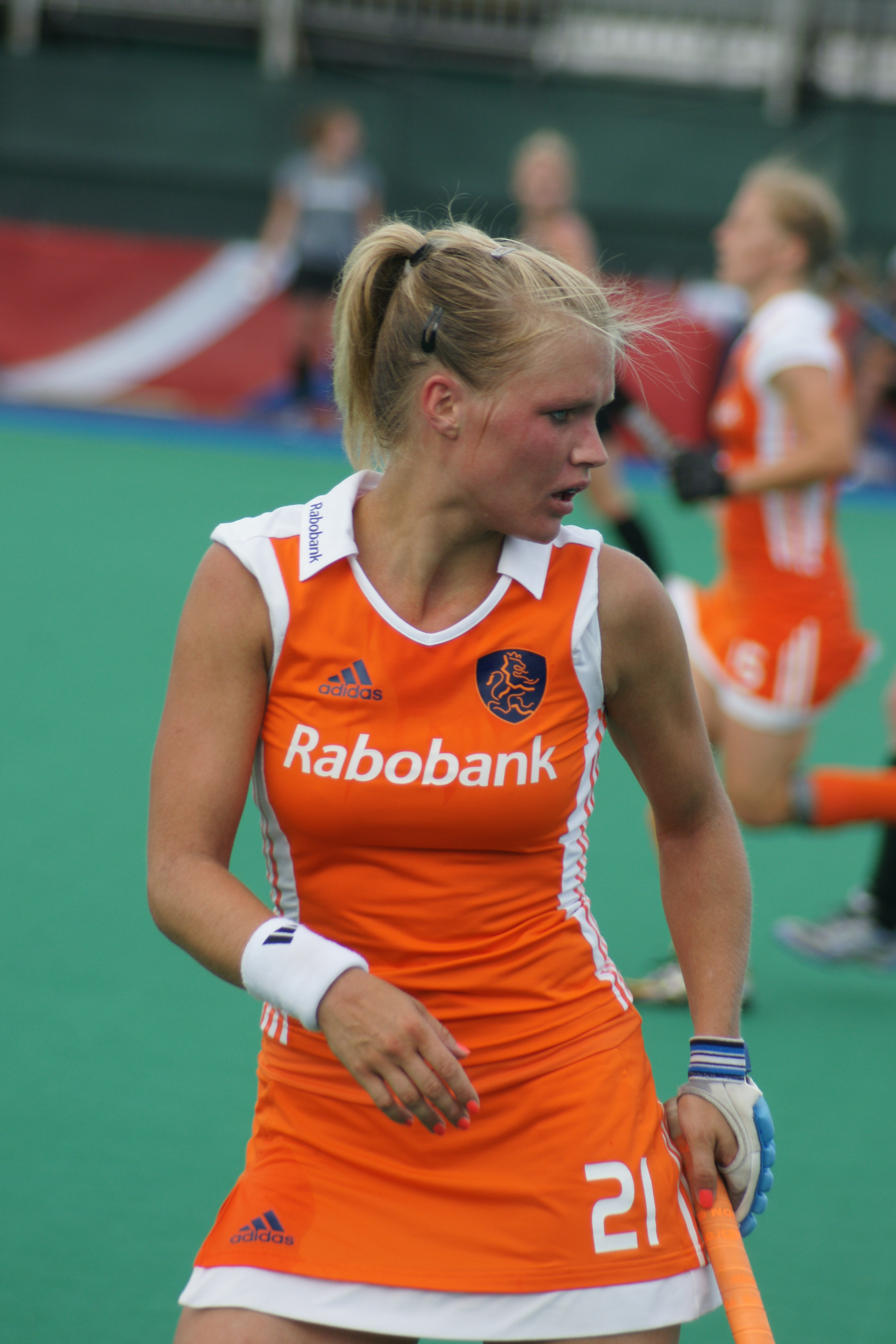

Personal information
- Born: 2 August 1984 (age 41)
- Height: 1.64 m (5 ft 4 1/2 in)
- Weight: 59 kg (130 lb)

Sport
- Country: Netherlands
- Sport: Field hockey
Medal record
Olympic Games
Gold medal – first place	2008 Beijing	Team competition
Gold medal – first place	2012 London	Team competition
World Championship
Gold medal – first place	2006 Madrid	Team competition
Silver medal – second place	2010 Rosario	Team competition
European Championship
Gold medal – first place	2005 Dublin	Team competition
Gold medal – first place	2011 Gladbach	Team competition
Silver medal – second place	2007 Manchester	Team competition
Champions Trophy
Gold medal – first place	2005 Canberra	Team competition
Gold medal – first place	2007 Quilmes	Team competition
Bronze medal – third place	2006 Amstelveen	Team competition
- Updated on 30 July 2012

Sophie Polkamp (born 2 August 1984 in Groningen) is a Dutch field hockey player, who played as a defender for Dutch club Stichtse Cricket en Hockey Club and later for Amsterdamsche Hockey & Bandy Club (AHBC).

Polkamp also plays for the Netherlands national team and was part of the Dutch squad that became world champions at the 2006 Women's Hockey World Cup and won the 2007 Champions Trophy.

At the 2008 Summer Olympics in Beijing she won an Olympic gold medal with the Dutch national team, beating the hosts China in the final 2–0. Polkamp was also a gold medallist at the 2012 London Olympic Games, where the Netherlands beat Argentina, also 2–0. She announced her retirement from international competition on 3 June 2013, shortly after the AHBC became Dutch champions.

== Personal life ==
Polkamp is in a relationship with former Dutch field hockey international Robbert Kemperman.
