= Cha Se-na =

South Korean field hockey player

Cha Se-Na (born 15 May 1986, in Seoul) is a South Korean field hockey player. At the 2012 Summer Olympics she competed with the Korea women's national field hockey team in the women's tournament.

== Accidents ==
In 2012 she was found unconscious at her bathroom flat in Seoul, it was due to a smell intoxication, the origin of the smell wasn't found.
