= Kim Lammers =

Dutch field hockey player

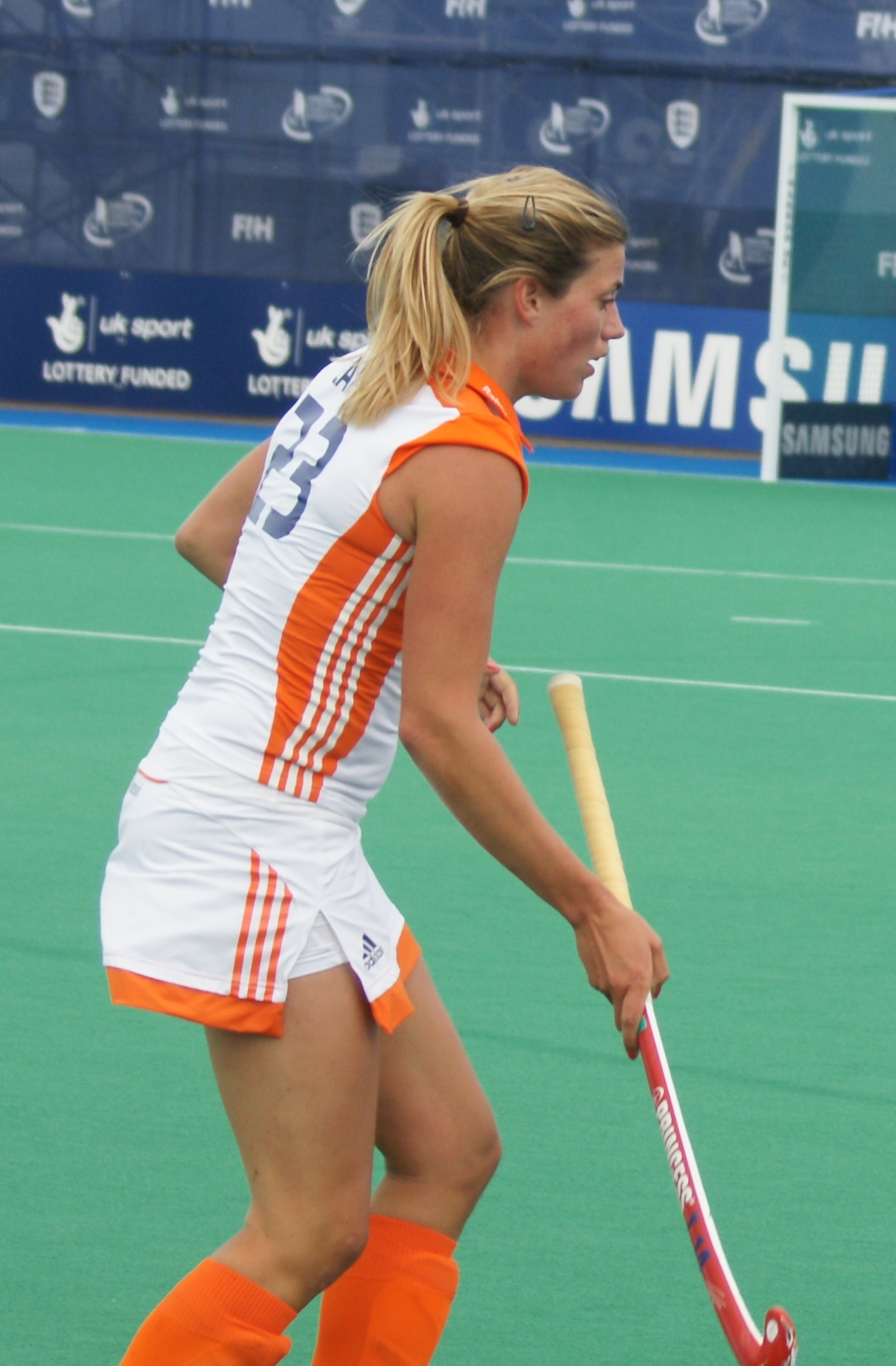

Personal information
- Full name: Kim Lammers
- Born: 21 April 1981 (age 45) Amsterdam, Netherlands
- Height: 1.76 m (5 ft 9 in)
- Weight: 69 kg (152 lb)

Sport
- Country: Netherlands
- Sport: Field hockey
Medal record
Olympic Games
Gold medal – first place	2012 London	Team
World Cup
Gold medal – first place	2006 Madrid	Team
Gold medal – first place	2014 The Hague	Team
Silver medal – second place	2002 Perth	Team
Silver medal – second place	2010 Rosario	Team
European Championship
Gold medal – first place	2003 Barcelona	Team
Gold medal – first place	2005 Dublin	Team
Gold medal – first place	2009 Amstelveen	Team
Gold medal – first place	2011 Gladbach	Team
Silver medal – second place	2007 Manchester	Team
Bronze medal – third place	2013 Boom	Team
Champions Trophy
Gold medal – first place	2004 Rosario	Team
Gold medal – first place	2005 Canberra	Team
Gold medal – first place	2007 Quilmes	Team
Gold medal – first place	2011 Amstelveen	Team
Silver medal – second place	2010 Nottingham	Team
Bronze medal – third place	2002 Macau	Team
Bronze medal – third place	2003 Sydney	Team
Bronze medal – third place	2006 Amstelveen	Team
Bronze medal – third place	2009 Sydney	Team
Bronze medal – third place	2012 Rosario	Team

Kim Lammers (born 21 April 1981) is a Dutch field hockey player who plays as a striker for Dutch club Laren and the Netherlands national team. She was part of the Dutch squad that became world champions at the 2006 Women's Hockey World Cup and won the gold medal at the 2012 Summer Olympics.

In 2021, she appeared on the television show De Verraders.
