= Carlijn Welten =

Dutch field hockey player

Medal record

Women's field hockey

Representing the Netherlands

European Championship
Silver medal – second place	2007 Manchester	Team competition

Champions Trophy
Gold medal – first place	2007 Quilmes	Team competition
Bronze medal – third place	2008 M'gladbach	Team competition

Carlijn Welten (born 30 October 1987) is a Dutch field hockey player, born in Utrecht but brought up and living in Heerlen, who plays as a forward for Dutch club Stichtse Cricket en Hockey Club. She also plays for the Netherlands national team and was part of the Dutch squad that became the 2007 Champions Trophy winner.
