= Cho Hye-sook =

South Korean hockey player (born 1983)

Personal information
- Nationality: South Korean
- Born: 15 November 1983 (age 42)

Sport
- Sport: Field hockey

Cho Hye-sook (born 15 November 1983) is a South Korean field hockey player. She competed in the women's tournament at the 2008 Summer Olympics.
