= Ian Rutledge =

Australian field hockey coach

Ian Gregory Rutledge (born 24 June 1972 in Cudal, New South Wales) is a field hockey coach, who was born in Australia. He attended both primary and secondary schooling in Orange, New South Wales, being a student at The Canobolas High School (now known as Canobolas Rural Technology High School) from 1985 to 1990.

Ian was responsible for qualifying the New Zealand Women's Hockey Team (the Black Sticks) for the 2004 and 2008 Olympics and has continued to coach Australian National League Teams. He has been employed with Hockey Australia as Coaching Manager, the Australian Sports Commission as a High Performance Coach Consultant and also as a Sports Performance Manager with the Australian Institute of Sport.

Ian commenced employment with Field Hockey Canada in March 2013, as head coach of the Women's National Team.

Ian is married (to Donnette Marjoram, who also attended Canobolas High), and has two children (Imogen and Joshua).
