= Fatima Moreira de Melo =

Dutch field hockey and poker player

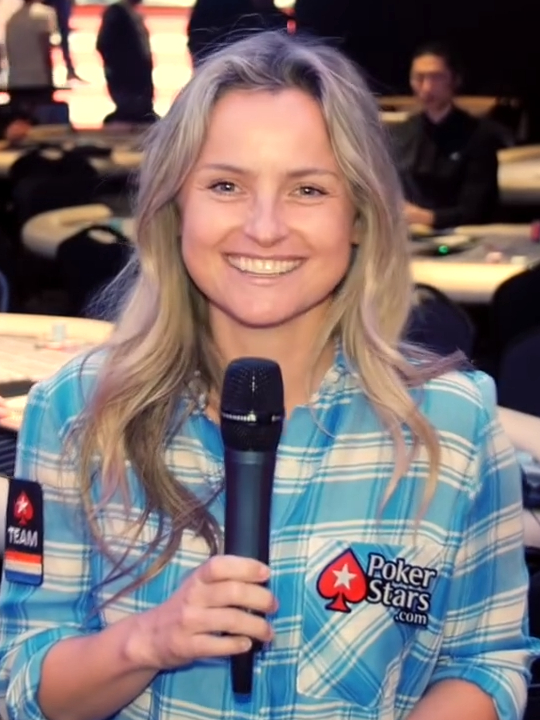
- De Melo at the World Poker Tour in 2015.

Personal information
- Born: 4 July 1978 (age 48) Rotterdam

Sport
- Sport: Field hockey
- Position: Midfield/Backward
Senior career
| Years | Team | Caps | Goals |
| 1999- -Present | HGC; HC Rotterdam | - | - |
National team
| Years | Team | Caps | Goals |
| 1997-2011 | Netherlands | 191 | (30) |
Medal record
Women's field hockey
Representing the Netherlands
Olympic Games
| Gold medal – first place | 2008 Beijing | Team competition |
| Silver medal – second place | 2004 Athens | Team competition |
| Bronze medal – third place | 2000 Sydney | Team competition |
World Cup
| Gold medal – first place | 2006 Madrid | Team competition |
| Silver medal – second place | 1998 Utrecht | Team competition |
| Silver medal – second place | 2002 Perth | Team competition |
Champions Trophy
| Gold medal – first place | 2000 Amstelveen | Team competition |
| Gold medal – first place | 2004 Rosario | Team competition |
| Gold medal – first place | 2005 Canberra | Team competition |
| Gold medal – first place | 2007 Quilmes | Team competition |
| Silver medal – second place | 1999 Brisbane | Team competition |
| Silver medal – second place | 2001 Amstelveen | Team competition |
| Bronze medal – third place | 2002 Macau | Team competition |
| Bronze medal – third place | 2006 Amstelveen | Team competition |
- Updated on after 2007 Champions Trophy

Fatima Moreira de Melo (born 4 July 1978) is a former Dutch field hockey player and professional poker player of Portuguese descent on her father's side. She has played 191 international matches for the Dutch national team, scoring 30 goals. De Melo's debut match with the senior team was on 21 October 1997 against Germany, which ended in a 2–1 victory for the Netherlands. She played as a striker. In the Dutch national competition she has played for Tempo '34, HGC and HC Rotterdam. De Melo was part of the Dutch squad that became World Champion at the 2006 Women's Hockey World Cup and which won the 2007 Champions Trophy. In December 2006, she became Rotterdam Sportswoman of the Year and became the new face of the Rabobank in their Dutch TV advertisements.

At the 2008 Summer Olympics in Beijing, she won an Olympic gold medal with the Dutch national team beating China in the final 2–0.

Besides playing field hockey, de Melo also studied at the Erasmus University Rotterdam where she obtained an LL.M. degree in Criminal law in 2006. She furthermore has presented TV programs for both local and national TV stations. She also has a career as a singer. She performed the theme song for the International Hockey Federation's International Year of the Youth at the closing of the 2001 Men's World Cup Hockey Qualifier in Edinburgh. De Melo's father is a Portuguese diplomat stationed in the Netherlands. Her boyfriend is pro-tennis player Raemon Sluiter.

De Melo belonged to the Team PokerStars: Sportstars, and one could find her playing tournaments behind the nickname FatimaDeMelo on the PokerStars online poker card room. She left her role as Sporting Icon Pro in early 2020.

Awards
| Preceded by (Netherlands) Elisabeth Willeboordse | Rotterdam Sportswoman of the Year; 2006 | Succeeded by (Netherlands) Elisabeth Willeboordse |
