= Pan Fengzhen =

Chinese field hockey player

Medal record
Women's field hockey
Representing China
Olympic Games
Silver medal – second place	2008 Beijing	Team competition

Pan Fengzhen (潘凤贞, born 1985) is a field hockey player from China, who won a silver medal with the national women's hockey team at the 2008 Summer Olympics in Beijing.
