= Michael Behrmann =

German field hockey coach

Michael Behrmann (born 1 December 1966) is a German field hockey coach. At the 2012 Summer Olympics he coached the Germany women's national field hockey team.

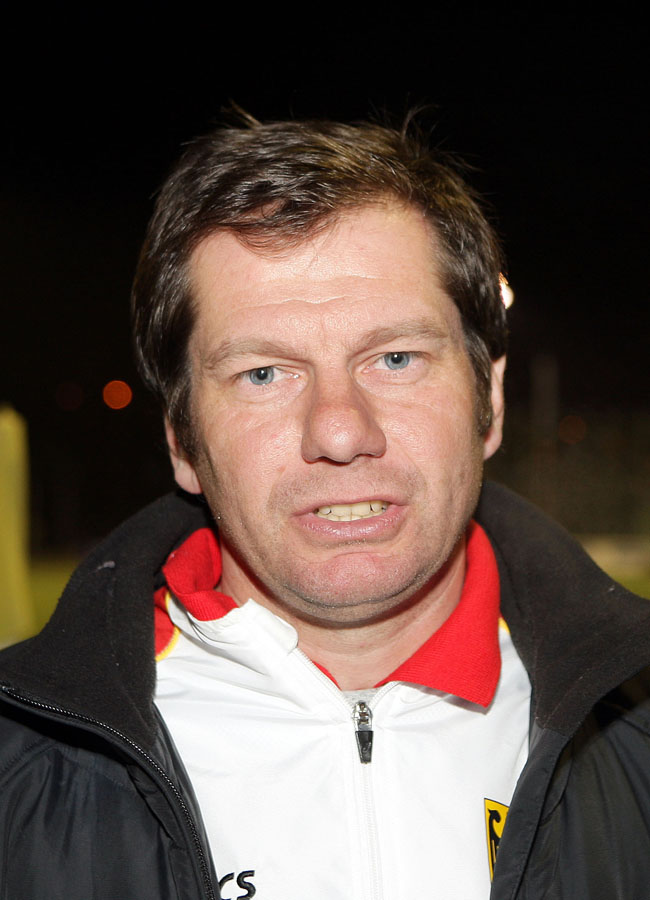
Michael Behrmann 2008
