= Maartje Paumen =

Dutch field hockey player

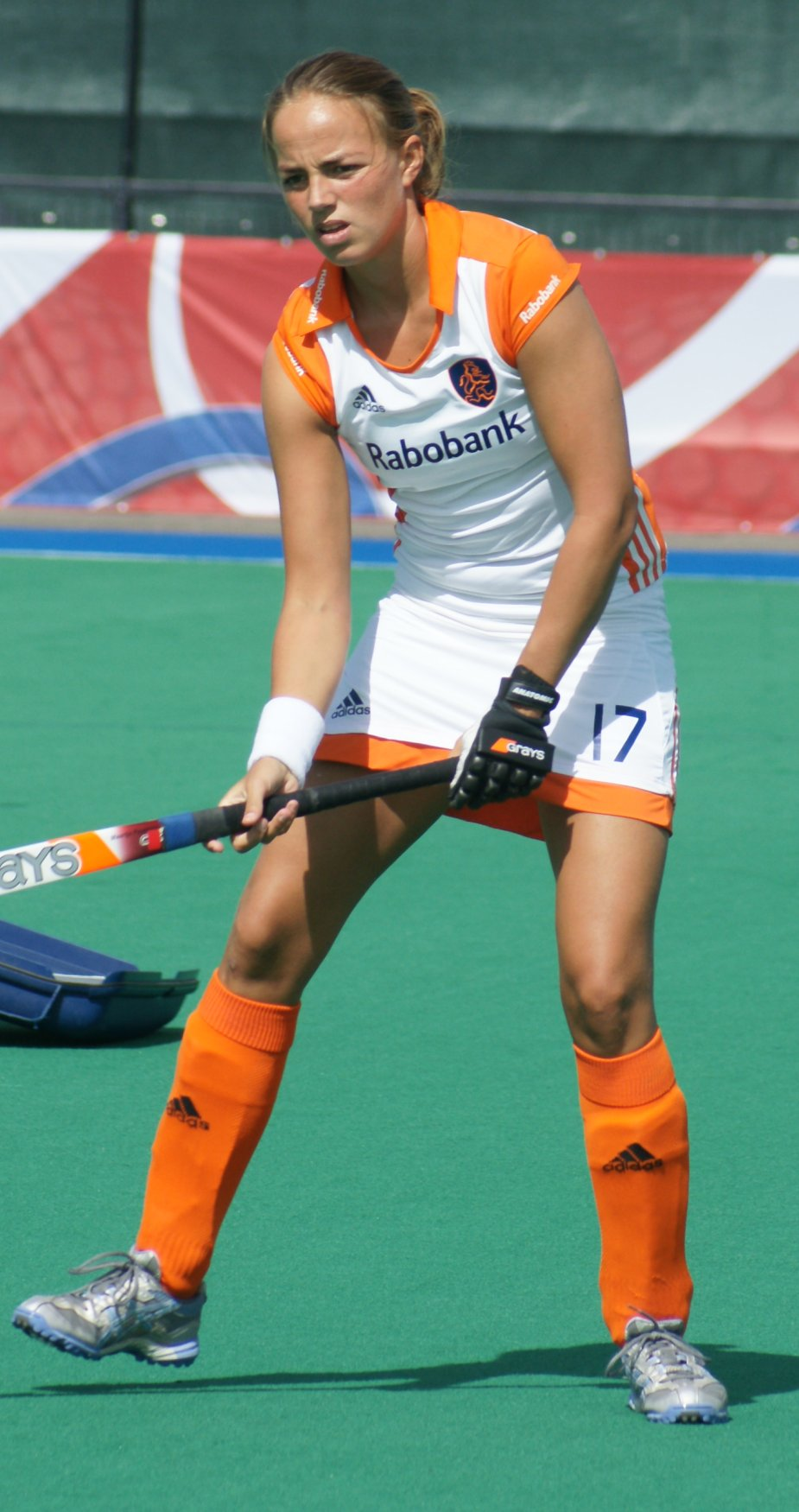

Personal information
- Nationality: Dutch
- Born: 19 September 1985 (age 40) Geleen, Netherlands
- Height: 1.76 m (5 ft 9 in)
- Weight: 66 kg (146 lb)

Sport
- Country: Netherlands
- Sport: Field hockey
Medal record
Olympic Games
Gold medal – first place	2008 Beijing	Team
Gold medal – first place	2012 London	Team
Silver medal – second place	2016 Rio de Janeiro	Team
World Championship
Gold medal – first place	2006 Madrid
Gold medal – first place	2014 The Hague
Silver medal – second place	2010 Rosario
European Championship
Gold medal – first place	2005 Dublin
Gold medal – first place	2009 Amstelveen
Gold medal – first place	2011 Gladbach
Silver medal – second place	2007 Manchester
Silver medal – second place	2015 London
Bronze medal – third place	2013 Boom
Champions Trophy
Gold medal – first place	2004 Rosario
Gold medal – first place	2005 Canberra
Gold medal – first place	2007 Quilmes
Gold medal – first place	2011 Amstelveen
Silver medal – second place	2010 Nottingham
Silver medal – second place	2016 London
Bronze medal – third place	2006 Amstelveen
Bronze medal – third place	2009 Sydney
Bronze medal – third place	2012 Rosario
Bronze medal – third place	2014 Mendoza

Maartje Yvonne Helene Paumen (born 19 September 1985) is a former Dutch field hockey player. She is currently the assistant coach for Dutch club MOP. She previously played for Dutch clubs Oranje Zwart and HC Den Bosch and Belgian club Royal Antwerp. She also played for the Netherlands national team and was part of the Dutch squad that became world champions at the 2006 Women's Hockey World Cup in Madrid and the 2014 Women's Hockey World Cup in The Hague. She also won the 2007 Champions Trophy and the 2011 Champions Trophy. With 195 goals in 235 games, she is the all-time top scorer for the Dutch national team. She is also the all-time top scorer in the national Dutch hockey league, the Hoofdklasse.

At the 2008 Summer Olympics in Beijing, she won an Olympic gold medal with the Dutch national team beating China in the final 2–0. The team kept its Olympic title at the 2012 Summer Olympics in London, beating the Argentinian team 2–0 in the final. She scored the second goal from a penalty and this was her fourteenth goal at the Olympics, which makes her the top Olympic scorer ever. In the 2016 Summer Olympics in Rio de Janeiro she won an Olympic silver medal, after losing to Great Britain in penalty shootouts. She was also the top scorer of the 2010 Women's Hockey World Cup as well as the 2014 Women's Hockey World Cup. She is openly lesbian. Paumen has been selected as FIH Player of the Year in 2011 and 2012.

== International goals ==
No.	Date	Venue	Opponent	Score	Result	Competition
1.	14 August 2005	Dublin, Ireland	Spain	1–0	3–0	2005 Women's EuroHockey Nations Championship
2.	16 August 2005	Dublin, Ireland	France	4–0	5–0	2005 Women's EuroHockey Nations Championship
3.	17 August 2005	Dublin, Ireland	Ireland	1–0	4–0	2005 Women's EuroHockey Nations Championship
4.	17 August 2005	Dublin, Ireland	Ireland	4–0	4–0	2005 Women's EuroHockey Nations Championship
5.	26 November 2005	Canberra, Australia	Argentina	2–1	2–1	2005 Women's Hockey Champions Trophy
6.	9 July 2006	Amstelveen, Netherlands	Germany	1–1	3–1	2006 Women's Hockey Champions Trophy
7.	11 July 2006	Amstelveen, Netherlands	New Zealand	3–0	4–0	2006 Women's Hockey Champions Trophy
8.	26 August 2006	Virginia Beach, United States	United States	1–0	3–0	2006 March on Madrid Hockey Tournament
9.	27 August 2006	Virginia Beach, United States	Argentina	2–1	4–2	2006 March on Madrid Hockey Tournament
10.	27 September 2006	Madrid, Spain	India	1–0	3–2	2006 Women's Hockey World Cup
11.	8 October 2006	Madrid, Spain	Australia	1–0	3–1	2006 Women's Hockey World Cup
12.	8 October 2006	Madrid, Spain	Australia	3–1	3–1	2006 Women's Hockey World Cup
13.	14 January 2007	Quilmes, Argentina	Japan	1–0	3–0	2007 Women's Hockey Champions Trophy
14.	21 January 2007	Quilmes, Argentina	Argentina	1–0	1–0	2007 Women's Hockey Champions Trophy
15.	18 August 2007	Manchester, England	Italy	1–0	9–1	2007 Women's EuroHockey Nations Championship
16.	10 August 2008	Beijing, China	South Africa	3–0	6–0	2008 Summer Olympics
17.	10 August 2008	Beijing, China	South Africa	5–0	6–0	2008 Summer Olympics
18.	12 August 2008	Beijing, China	South Korea	1–0	3–2	2008 Summer Olympics
19.	12 August 2008	Beijing, China	South Korea	3–2	3–2	2008 Summer Olympics
20.	14 August 2008	Beijing, China	China	1–0	1–0	2008 Summer Olympics
21.	16 August 2008	Beijing, China	Australia	1–1	2–1	2008 Summer Olympics
22.	16 August 2008	Beijing, China	Australia	2–1	2–1	2008 Summer Olympics
23.	18 August 2008	Beijing, China	Spain	1–0	2–0	2008 Summer Olympics
24.	20 August 2008	Beijing, China	Argentina	1–0	5–2	2008 Summer Olympics
25.	20 August 2008	Beijing, China	Argentina	2–0	5–2	2008 Summer Olympics
26.	20 August 2008	Beijing, China	Argentina	4–0	5–2	2008 Summer Olympics
27.	11 July 2009	Sydney, Australia	England	2–2	2–2	2009 Women's Hockey Champions Trophy
28.	16 July 2009	Sydney, Australia	Argentina	2–1	2–2	2009 Women's Hockey Champions Trophy
29.	18 July 2009	Sydney, Australia	Australia	1–1	1–2	2009 Women's Hockey Champions Trophy
30.	19 July 2009	Sydney, Australia	Germany	2–0	5–2	2009 Women's Hockey Champions Trophy
31.	19 July 2009	Sydney, Australia	Germany	5–1	5–2	2009 Women's Hockey Champions Trophy
32.	22 August 2009	Amsterdam, Netherlands	Azerbaijan	6–0	10–0	2009 Women's EuroHockey Nations Championship
33.	22 August 2009	Amsterdam, Netherlands	Azerbaijan	7–0	10–0	2009 Women's EuroHockey Nations Championship
34.	23 August 2009	Amsterdam, Netherlands	England	1–0	5–0	2009 Women's EuroHockey Nations Championship
35.	23 August 2009	Amsterdam, Netherlands	England	3–0	5–0	2009 Women's EuroHockey Nations Championship
36.	23 August 2009	Amsterdam, Netherlands	England	4–0	5–0	2009 Women's EuroHockey Nations Championship
37.	23 August 2009	Amsterdam, Netherlands	England	5–0	5–0	2009 Women's EuroHockey Nations Championship
38.	25 August 2009	Amsterdam, Netherlands	Russia	2–0	9–0	2009 Women's EuroHockey Nations Championship
39.	25 August 2009	Amsterdam, Netherlands	Russia	5–0	9–0	2009 Women's EuroHockey Nations Championship
40.	25 August 2009	Amsterdam, Netherlands	Russia	8–0	9–0	2009 Women's EuroHockey Nations Championship
41.	10 July 2010	Nottingham, England	New Zealand	2–1	3–1	2010 Women's Hockey Champions Trophy
42.	13 July 2010	Nottingham, England	China	1–1	2–1	2010 Women's Hockey Champions Trophy
43.	13 July 2010	Nottingham, England	China	2–1	2–1	2010 Women's Hockey Champions Trophy
44.	15 July 2010	Nottingham, England	Argentina	2–1	2–4	2010 Women's Hockey Champions Trophy
45.	30 August 2010	Rosario, Argentina	India	4–1	7–1	2010 Women's Hockey World Cup
46.	30 August 2010	Rosario, Argentina	India	6–1	7–1	2010 Women's Hockey World Cup
47.	30 August 2010	Rosario, Argentina	India	7–1	7–1	2010 Women's Hockey World Cup
48.	1 September 2010	Rosario, Argentina	New Zealand	4–1	7–3	2010 Women's Hockey World Cup
49.	3 September 2010	Rosario, Argentina	Australia	1–0	4–1	2010 Women's Hockey World Cup
50.	3 September 2010	Rosario, Argentina	Australia	2–1	4–1	2010 Women's Hockey World Cup
51.	3 September 2010	Rosario, Argentina	Australia	3–1	4–1	2010 Women's Hockey World Cup
52.	5 September 2010	Rosario, Argentina	Germany	1–1	2–1	2010 Women's Hockey World Cup
53.	7 September 2010	Rosario, Argentina	Japan	2–0	5–2	2010 Women's Hockey World Cup
54.	7 September 2010	Rosario, Argentina	Japan	5–0	5–2	2010 Women's Hockey World Cup
55.	9 September 2010	Rosario, Argentina	England	1–1	1–1 (a.e.t.) (4–3 p)	2010 Women's Hockey World Cup
56.	11 September 2010	Rosario, Argentina	Argentina	1–2	1–3	2010 Women's Hockey World Cup
57.	25 June 2011	Amstelveen, Netherlands	Australia	1–0	3–0	2011 Women's Hockey Champions Trophy
58.	30 June 2011	Amstelveen, Netherlands	Argentina	1–0	2–1	2011 Women's Hockey Champions Trophy
59.	30 June 2011	Amstelveen, Netherlands	Argentina	2–1	2–1	2011 Women's Hockey Champions Trophy
60.	3 July 2011	Amstelveen, Netherlands	Argentina	1–3	3–3 (a.e.t.) (3–2 p)	2011 Women's Hockey Champions Trophy
61.	3 July 2011	Amstelveen, Netherlands	Argentina	2–3	3–3 (a.e.t.) (3–2 p)	2011 Women's Hockey Champions Trophy
62.	3 July 2011	Amstelveen, Netherlands	Argentina	3–3	3–3 (a.e.t.) (3–2 p)	2011 Women's Hockey Champions Trophy
63.	20 August 2011	Mönchengladbach, Germany	Azerbaijan	1–0	8–0	2011 Women's EuroHockey Championship
64.	20 August 2011	Mönchengladbach, Germany	Azerbaijan	5–0	8–0	2011 Women's EuroHockey Championship
65.	20 August 2011	Mönchengladbach, Germany	Azerbaijan	7–0	8–0	2011 Women's EuroHockey Championship
66.	23 August 2011	Mönchengladbach, Germany	Italy	1–1	5–1	2011 Women's EuroHockey Championship
67.	23 August 2011	Mönchengladbach, Germany	Italy	4–1	5–1	2011 Women's EuroHockey Championship
68.	31 January 2012	Rosario, Argentina	Japan	2–0	4–1	2012 Women's Hockey Champions Trophy
69.	31 January 2012	Rosario, Argentina	Japan	3–1	4–1	2012 Women's Hockey Champions Trophy
70.	2 February 2012	Rosario, Argentina	New Zealand	2–0	3–0	2012 Women's Hockey Champions Trophy
71.	4 February 2012	Rosario, Argentina	Argentina	1–1	2–2 (a.e.t.) (0–2 p)	2012 Women's Hockey Champions Trophy
72.	5 June 2012	Chiswick, England	Australia	1–1	2–1	2012 Women's Hockey Investec Cup
73.	5 June 2012	Chiswick, England	Australia	2–1	2–1	2012 Women's Hockey Investec Cup
74.	9 June 2012	Chiswick, England	South Africa	2–0	2–2 (4–2 p)	2012 Women's Hockey Investec Cup
75.	10 June 2012	Chiswick, England	Australia	2–0	4–1	2012 Women's Hockey Investec Cup
76.	10 June 2012	Chiswick, England	Australia	4–1	4–1	2012 Women's Hockey Investec Cup
77.	8 August 2012	London, United Kingdom	New Zealand	1–1	2–2 (a.e.t.) (3–1 p)	2012 Summer Olympics
78.	8 August 2012	London, United Kingdom	New Zealand	2–2	2–2 (a.e.t.) (3–1 p)	2012 Summer Olympics
79.	10 August 2012	London, United Kingdom	Argentina	2–0	2–0	2012 Summer Olympics
80.	4 February 2013	Cape Town, South Africa	Australia	1–1	2–2	2013 Women's Hockey Investec Cup
81.	5 February 2013	Cape Town, South Africa	England	2–1	4–1	2013 Women's Hockey Investec Cup
82.	5 February 2013	Cape Town, South Africa	England	3–1	4–1	2013 Women's Hockey Investec Cup
83.	7 February 2013	Cape Town, South Africa	South Africa	2–0	3–1	2013 Women's Hockey Investec Cup
84.	7 February 2013	Cape Town, South Africa	South Africa	3–0	3–1	2013 Women's Hockey Investec Cup
85.	9 February 2013	Cape Town, South Africa	England	1–0	3–0	2013 Women's Hockey Investec Cup
86.	9 February 2013	Cape Town, South Africa	England	3–0	3–0	2013 Women's Hockey Investec Cup
87.	13 June 2013	Rotterdam, Netherlands	Japan	1–0	1–1	2012–13 Women's FIH Hockey World League Semifinals
88.	16 June 2013	Rotterdam, Netherlands	Chile	3–0	10–0	2012–13 Women's FIH Hockey World League Semifinals
89.	16 June 2013	Rotterdam, Netherlands	Chile	5–0	10–0	2012–13 Women's FIH Hockey World League Semifinals
90.	16 June 2013	Rotterdam, Netherlands	Chile	6–0	10–0	2012–13 Women's FIH Hockey World League Semifinals
91.	18 June 2013	Rotterdam, Netherlands	India	2–0	7–1	2012–13 Women's FIH Hockey World League Semifinals
92.	18 June 2013	Rotterdam, Netherlands	India	7–1	7–1	2012–13 Women's FIH Hockey World League Semifinals
93.	17 August 2013	Boom, Belgium	Ireland	1–0	6–0	2013 Women's EuroHockey Championship
94.	17 August 2013	Boom, Belgium	Ireland	3–0	6–0	2013 Women's EuroHockey Championship
95.	20 August 2013	Boom, Belgium	Belarus	2–0	7–0	2013 Women's EuroHockey Championship
96.	20 August 2013	Boom, Belgium	Belarus	6–0	7–0	2013 Women's EuroHockey Championship
97.	20 August 2013	Boom, Belgium	Belarus	7–0	7–0	2013 Women's EuroHockey Championship
98.	30 November 2013	San Miguel de Tucumán, Argentina	Germany	1–0	6–0	2012–13 Women's FIH Hockey World League Final
99.	1 December 2013	San Miguel de Tucumán, Argentina	England	1–0	3–2	2012–13 Women's FIH Hockey World League Final
100.	1 December 2013	San Miguel de Tucumán, Argentina	England	2–2	3–2	2012–13 Women's FIH Hockey World League Final
101.	7 December 2013	San Miguel de Tucumán, Argentina	Argentina	1–0	2–2 (3–2 p)	2012–13 Women's FIH Hockey World League Final
102.	8 December 2013	San Miguel de Tucumán, Argentina	Australia	1–1	5–1	2012–13 Women's FIH Hockey World League Final
103.	8 December 2013	San Miguel de Tucumán, Argentina	Australia	4–1	5–1	2012–13 Women's FIH Hockey World League Final
104.	31 May 2014	The Hague, Netherlands	Japan	3–0	6–1	2014 Women's Hockey World Cup
105.	31 May 2014	The Hague, Netherlands	Japan	6–0	6–1	2014 Women's Hockey World Cup
106.	2 June 2014	The Hague, Netherlands	Belgium	3–0	4–0	2014 Women's Hockey World Cup
107.	9 June 2014	The Hague, Netherlands	South Korea	2–0	3–0	2014 Women's Hockey World Cup
108.	9 June 2014	The Hague, Netherlands	South Korea	3–0	3–0	2014 Women's Hockey World Cup
109.	12 June 2014	The Hague, Netherlands	Argentina	2–0	4–0	2014 Women's Hockey World Cup
110.	14 June 2014	The Hague, Netherlands	Australia	1–0	1–0	2014 Women's Hockey World Cup
111.	20 June 2015	Antwerp, Belgium	France	2–0	11–0	2014–15 Women's FIH Hockey World League Semifinals
112.	20 June 2015	Antwerp, Belgium	France	9–0	11–0	2014–15 Women's FIH Hockey World League Semifinals
113.	20 June 2015	Antwerp, Belgium	France	11–0	11–0	2014–15 Women's FIH Hockey World League Semifinals
114.	23 June 2015	Antwerp, Belgium	Japan	1–0	4–0	2014–15 Women's FIH Hockey World League Semifinals
115.	23 June 2015	Antwerp, Belgium	Japan	3–0	4–0	2014–15 Women's FIH Hockey World League Semifinals
116.	27 June 2015	Antwerp, Belgium	Italy	1–0	9–0	2014–15 Women's FIH Hockey World League Semifinals
117.	27 June 2015	Antwerp, Belgium	Italy	2–0	9–0	2014–15 Women's FIH Hockey World League Semifinals
118.	27 June 2015	Antwerp, Belgium	Italy	6–0	9–0	2014–15 Women's FIH Hockey World League Semifinals
119.	2 July 2015	Antwerp, Belgium	Australia	2–1	5–1	2014–15 Women's FIH Hockey World League Semifinals
120.	22 August 2015	London, England	Poland	7–0	9–0	2015 Women's EuroHockey Championship
121.	26 August 2015	London, England	Belgium	3–0	5–0	2015 Women's EuroHockey Championship
122.	26 August 2015	London, England	Belgium	5–0	5–0	2015 Women's EuroHockey Championship
123.	18 June 2016	London, United Kingdom	New Zealand	1–0	6–2	2016 Women's Hockey Champions Trophy
124.	18 June 2016	London, United Kingdom	New Zealand	2–0	6–2	2016 Women's Hockey Champions Trophy
125.	18 June 2016	London, United Kingdom	New Zealand	4–2	6–2	2016 Women's Hockey Champions Trophy
126.	18 June 2016	London, United Kingdom	New Zealand	6–2	6–2	2016 Women's Hockey Champions Trophy
127.	19 June 2016	London, United Kingdom	Great Britain	2–0	2–0	2016 Women's Hockey Champions Trophy
128.	23 June 2016	London, United Kingdom	Australia	2–0	2–1	2016 Women's Hockey Champions Trophy
129.	7 August 2016	Rio de Janeiro, Brazil	Spain	4–0	5–0	2016 Summer Olympics
130.	7 August 2016	Rio de Janeiro, Brazil	Spain	5–0	5–0	2016 Summer Olympics
131.	12 August 2016	Rio de Janeiro, Brazil	New Zealand	1–0	1–1	2016 Summer Olympics
