= Tara Drysdale =

New Zealand field hockey player

Tara Drysdale (born 30 January 1979) is a New Zealand field hockey player who competed in the 2004 Summer Olympics and in the 2008 Summer Olympics.
