= Pilar Sánchez =

Spanish field hockey player (born 1982)

Pilar Sánchez Cervi (born 6 January 1982) is a Spanish field hockey player who competed for her country in the 2006 World Cup and the 2008 Summer Olympics, where her team finished 4th and 7th, respectively.
