= Rachel Robertson (field hockey) =

New Zealand field hockey player

Rachel Robertson (born 20 July 1976) is a New Zealand field hockey player who competed in the 2004 Summer Olympics.
