= Mai Shaoyan =

Chinese field hockey player

Personal information
- Born: January 19, 1979 (age 47)
Medal record
Women's field hockey
Representing China
Asian Games
Gold medal – first place	2006 Doha	Team
Asia Cup
Bronze medal – third place	2004 New Delhi

Mai Shaoyan (simplified Chinese: 麦少颜; traditional Chinese: 麥少顏; pinyin: Mài Shǎoyán; Jyutping: Mak6 Siu2 Ngaan4; born January 19, 1979, in Nanhai, Foshan, Guangdong) is a female Chinese field hockey player who competed at the 2004 Summer Olympics.

She finished fourth with the Chinese team in the women's competition. She played all six matches.
