= Martina Heinlein =

German field hockey player (born 1981)

Martina Heinlein (born 16 May 1981 in Starnberg) is a German field hockey player who competed in the 2008 Summer Olympics.
