= Christina Schütze =

German field hockey player

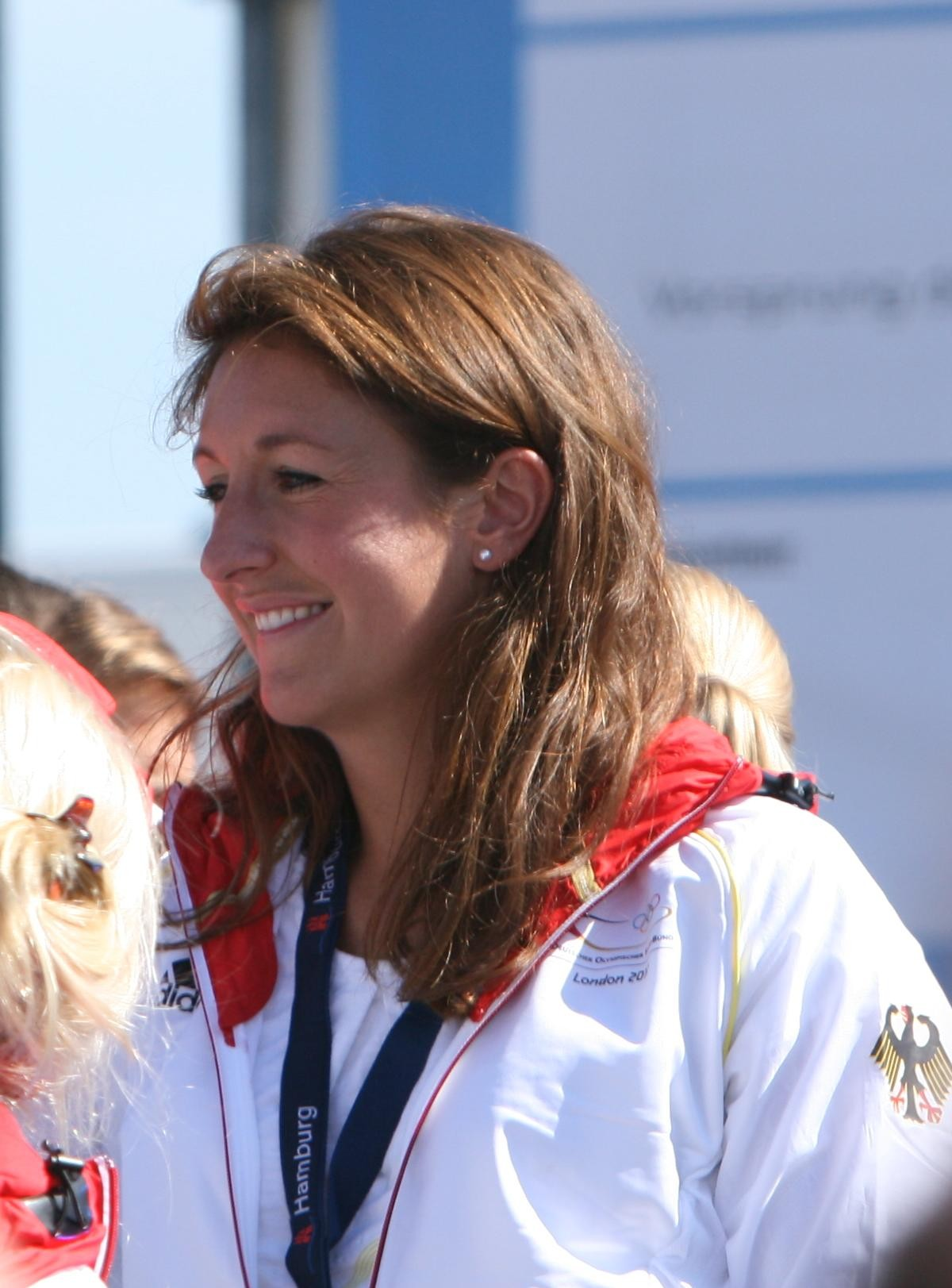
Christina Schütze

Christina Schütze (also spelled Schuetze, born 25 October 1983) is a German field hockey player who competed in the women's field hockey tournaments at the 2008 Beijing and 2012 London Summer Olympics.
