= Yvonne Frank =

German field hockey player (born 1980)

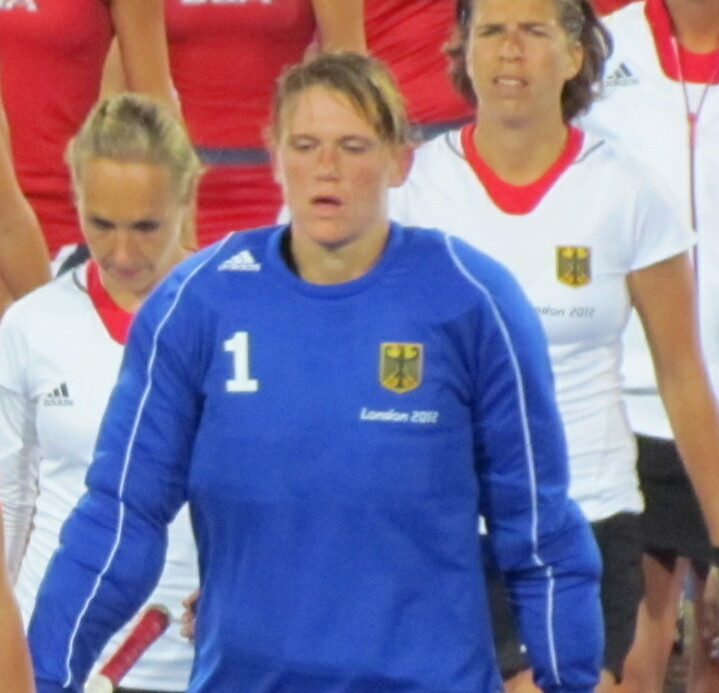
- Germany-USA, 2012 Summer Olympics

Personal information
- Born: 7 February 1980 (age 46) Duisburg, West Germany
- Height: 182 cm (6 ft 0 in)
- Weight: 78 kg (172 lb)

Sport
- Sport: Field hockey
- Position: Goalkeeper
National team
Years	Team	Caps	Goals
–2016	Germany	158	-
Medal record
Women's field hockey
Representing Germany
Olympic Games
Bronze medal – third place	2016 Rio de Janeiro	Team competition

Yvonne Frank (born 7 February 1980) is a German field hockey player.
