= List of Commonwealth Games medallists in field hockey =

This is the complete list of Commonwealth Games medallists in field hockey from 1998 to 2022.

== Medallists ==
=== Men's ===
Games	Gold	Silver	Bronze
1998	Australia (AUS); Michael Brennan; Adam Commens; Stephen Davies; Damon Diletti; Jason Duff; James Elmer; Paul Gaudoin; Mark Hickman; Jeremy Hiskins; Stephen Holt; Brent Livermore; Matthew Smith; Daniel Sproule; Jay Stacy; Lachlan Vivian-Taylor; Michael York	Malaysia (MAS); Nor Azlan Bakar; Nor Saiful Zaini; Mirnawan Nawawi; Jamaluddin Roslan; Calvin Fernandez; Krishnamurthy Gobinathan; Maninderjit Singh; Chairil Anwar Abdul Aziz; Keevan Raj; Kuhan Shanmuganathan; Mohd Madzli Ikmar; Shankar Ramu; Kaliswaran Muniandy; K. Logan Raj; Mohamad Syayrin Uda Karim; Ibrahim Suhaimi	England (ENG); Bobby Crutchley; Guy Fordham; Julian Halls; Stuart Head; Russell Garcia; Brett Garrard; Michael Johnson; David Luckes; Simon Mason; Mark Pearn; Justin Pidcock; Ben Sharpe; Jimmy Wallis; Bill Waugh; Duncan Woods; Jon Wyatt
2002	Australia (AUS); Aaron Hopkins; Ben Taylor; Bevan George; Brent Livermore; Craig Victory; Dean Butler; Jamie Dwyer; Liam de Young; Mark Hickman; Matthew Smith; Matthew Wells; Michael McCann; Paul Gaudoin; Scott Webster; Stephen Lambert; Troy Elder	New Zealand (NZL); Bevan Hari; Blair Hopping; Darren Smith; David Kosoof; Dean Couzins; Dion Gosling; Hayden Shaw; Michael Bevin; Mitesh Patel; Paul Woolford; Peter Stafford; Phil Burrows; Ryan Archibald; Simon Towns; Umesh Parag; Wayne McIndoe	Pakistan (PAK); Ahmed Alam; Ghazanfar Ali; Kamran Ashraf; Kashif Jawad; Mudassar Ali Khan; Muhammad Khalid; Muhammad Nadeem; Muhammad Qasim; Muhammad Saqlain; Muhammad Sarwar; Shabbir Muhammad; Muhammad Usman; Sohail Abbas; Tariq Imran; Waseem Ahmed; Zeeshan Ashraf
2006	Australia (AUS); Jamie Dwyer; Liam de Young; Michael McCann; Robert Hammond; Nathan Eglington; Mark Knowles; Luke Doerner; Grant Schubert; Bevan George; Stephen Lambert; Aaron Hopkins; Matthew Wells; Travis Brooks; Brent Livermore; Dean Butler; Stephen Mowlam	Pakistan (PAK); Salman Akbar; Imram Warsi; Muhammad Saqlain; Dilawar Hussain; Adnan Maqsood; Tariq Aziz; Rehan Butt; Shabbir Muhammad; Nasir Ahmed; Mudassar Ali Khan; Shakeel Abbasi; Imran Khan Yousafzai; Adnan Zakir; Muhammad Imran; Zeeshan Ashraf; Muhammad Zubair	Malaysia (MAS); Ibrahim Mohamed Nasihin; Rahim Muhamad Amin; Chua Boon Huat; K. Logan Raj; Kuhan Shanmuganathan; Nor Azlan Bakar; Megat Termizi Megat Azrafiq; Mohan Jiwa; Nor Mohamed Madzli; Tengku Ahmad Tajuddin; Razie Rahim; Keevan Raj; Ismail Abu; Azlan Misron; Mohan Jivan; Kumar Subramaniam
2010	Australia (AUS); Chris Ciriello; Des Abbott; Eddie Ockenden; Fergus Kavanagh; Glenn Turner; Jamie Dwyer; Jason Wilson; Joel Carroll; Liam de Young; Luke Doerner; Mark Knowles; Matthew Swann; Nathan Burgers; Robert Hammond; Simon Orchard; Trent Mitton	India (IND); Sandeep Singh; Bharat Chettri; Arjun Halappa; Sardara Singh; Sarvanjit Singh; Gurbaj Singh; Tushar Khandker; Rajpal Singh; Shivendra Singh; Bharat Chhikara; Dhananjay Mahadik; Vikram Pillay; Danish Mujtaba; Dharamvir Singh; Prabodh Tirkey; Ravi Pal	New Zealand (NZL); Phil Burrows; Simon Child; Dean Couzins; Steve Edwards; Nick Haig; Andrew Hayward; Blair Hilton; Hugo Inglis; Stephen Jenness; Shea McAleese; Arun Panchia; Kyle Pontifex; Bradley Shaw; Hayden Shaw; Blair Tarrant; Nick Wilson
2014	Australia (AUS); Simon Orchard; Chris Ciriello; Mark Knowles; Eddie Ockenden; Jacob Whetton; Matthew Gohdes; Aran Zalewski; Tristan White; Matthew Swann; Daniel Beale; Trent Mitton; Kieran Govers; Kiel Brown; Andrew Philpott; Andrew Charter; Fergus Kavanagh	India (IND); Rupinder Pal Singh; Kothajit Singh; Manpreet Singh; Sardara Singh; Dharamvir Singh; V. R. Raghunath; Gurbaj Singh; P. R. Sreejesh; Danish Mujtaba; Gurwinder Singh Chandi; S. V. Sunil; Birendra Lakra; Akashdeep Singh; Chinglensana Singh; Ramandeep Singh; Nikkin Thimmaiah	England (ENG); George Pinner; Iain Lewers; Daniel Fox; Barry Middleton; Henry Weir; Ashley Jackson; Simon Mantell; Harry Martin; Michael Hoare; David Condon; Mark Gleghorne; Phil Roper; Ollie Willars; Adam Dixon; Alastair Brogdon; Nicholas Catlin
2018	Australia (AUS); Lachlan Sharp; Tom Craig; Jake Harvie; Tom Wickham; Matthew Dawson; Jeremy Edwards; Mark Knowles; Eddie Ockenden; Jacob Whetton; Aaron Kleinschmidt; Aran Zalewski; Flynn Ogilvie; Daniel Beale; Tyler Lovell; Trent Mitton; Dylan Wotherspoon; Andrew Charter; Jeremy Hayward	New Zealand (NZL); Cory Bennett; Dane Lett; Harry Miskimmin; Nick Ross; Richard Joyce; Marcus Child; Jared Panchia; Aiden Sarikaya; Nic Woods; Devon Manchester; Kane Russell; Arun Panchia; Shea McAleese; Stephen Jenness; Dominic Newman; Hugo Inglis; George Muir; Hayden Phillips	England (ENG); George Pinner; Harry Gibson; Ollie Willars; William Weir; Harry Martin; Christopher Griffiths; Ian Sloan; Sam Ward; Mark Gleghorne; Phillip Roper; Adam Dixon; Barry Middleton; Brendan Creed; David Goodfield; Liam Ansell; David Condon; James Gall; Liam Sanford
2022	Australia (AUS); Jake Harvie; Tom Wickham; Matthew Dawson; Nathan Ephraums; Johan Durst; Jacob Anderson; Joshua Beltz; Eddie Ockenden; Jake Whetton; Blake Govers; Joshua Simmonds; Tim Howard; Aran Zalewski; Flynn Ogilvie; Daniel Beale; Timothy Brand; Andrew Charter; Jeremy Hayward	India (IND); Jarmanpreet Singh; Abhishek Nain; Surender Kumar; Manpreet Singh; Hardik Singh; Gurjant Singh; Mandeep Singh; Krishan Pathak; Harmanpreet Singh; Lalit Kumar Upadhyay; P. R. Sreejesh; Nilakanta Sharma; Shamsher Singh; Varun Kumar; Akashdeep Singh; Amit Rohidas; Jugraj Singh; Vivek Sagar Prasad	England (ENG); Jack Waller; Zachary Wallace; Christopher Griffiths; Ian Sloan; Sam Ward; James Albery; Phillip Roper; James Mazarelo; Stuart Rushmere; Brendan Creed; David Goodfield; Oliver Payne; Liam Ansell; David Condon; Nicholas Bandurak; Thomas Sorsby; Rhys Smith; William Calnan

=== Women's ===
Games	Gold	Silver	Bronze
1998	Australia (AUS); Alison Peek; Alyson Annan; Bianca Langham; Claire Mitchell-Taverner; Juliet Haslam; Justine Sowry; Kate Starre; Kate Allen; Katrina Powell; Kristen Towers; Lisa Powell; Louise Dobson; Michelle Andrews; Nikki Mott; Rachel Imison; Rechelle Hawkes	England (ENG); Carolyn Reid; Denise Marston-Smith; Fiona Greenham; Hilary Rose; Jackie Empson; Jane Sixsmith; Jane Smith; Jennie Bimson; Karen Brown; Kerry Moore; Kirsty Bowden; Lucilla Wright; Lucy Newcombe; Mandy Nicholson; Melanie Clewlow; Tina Cullen	New Zealand (NZL); Anna Lawrence; Diana Weavers; Emily Gillam; Helen Clarke; Jenny Duck; Jenny Shepherd; Karen Smith; Kate Trolove; Lisa Walton; Mandy Smith; Moira Senior; Robyn Toomey; Skippy Hamahona; Sandy Bennett; Suzie Pearce; Tina Bell-Kake
2002	India (IND); Kanti Baa; Suman Bala; Sanggai Chanu; Tingonleima Chanu; Ngasepam Pakpi Devi; Suraj Lata Devi (c); Sita Gussain; Saba Anjum Karim; Amandeep Kaur; Manjinder Kaur; Mamta Kharab; Jyoti Sunita Kullu; Helen Mary; Masira Surin; Pritam Rani Siwach; Sumrai Tete	England (ENG); Anna Bennett; Carolyn Reid; Lucilla Wright; Frances Houslop; Helen Grant; Helen Richardson; Hilary Rose; Jane Smith; Jennie Bimson; Joanne Ellis; Kate Walsh; Leisa King; Mandy Nicholson; Melanie Clewlow; Rachel Walker; Sarah Blanks	Australia (AUS); Angie Skirving; Bianca Langham-Pritchard; Bianca Netzler; Brooke Morrison; Carmel Bakurski; Joanne Banning; Julie Towers; Karen Smith; Katrina Powell; Louise Dobson; Melanie Twitt; Ngaire Smith; Nikki Hudson; Nina Bonner; Rachel Imison; Tammy Cole
2006	Australia (AUS); Toni Cronk; Suzie Faulkner; Karen Smith; Kim Walker; Rebecca Sanders; Kate Hollywood; Emily Halliday; Madonna Blyth; Wendy Beattie; Nicole Arrold; Kobie McGurk; Rachel Imison; Angie Skirving; Melanie Twitt; Sarah Taylor; Nikki Hudson	India (IND); Helen Mary; Kanti Baa; Nilima Kujur; Rajwinder Kaur; Sumrai Tete; Masira Surin; Subhadra Pradhan; Asunta Lakra; Jyoti Sunita Kullu; Mamta Kharab; Jasjeet Kaur Handa; Surinder Kaur; Saba Anjum Karim; Sanggai Chanu; Sarita Lakra; Rajni Bala	England (ENG); Carolyn Reid; Beth Storry; Lisa Wooding; Crista Cullen; Melanie Clewlow; Helen Grant; Helen Richardson; Lucilla Wright; Kate Walsh; Jennie Bimson; Alex Danson; Joanne Ellis; Cathy Gilliat-Smith; Charlotte Hartley; Beckie Herbert; Chloe Rogers
2010	Australia (AUS); Alison Bruce; Ashleigh Nelson; Casey Eastham; Emily Hurtz; Fiona Boyce; Fiona Johnson; Jayde Taylor; Kate Jenner; Kate Hollywood; Kobie McGurk; Madonna Blyth; Megan Rivers; Nicole Arrold; Rachael Lynch; Shelly Liddelow; Toni Cronk	New Zealand (NZL); Kayla Sharland; Emily Naylor; Krystal Forgesson; Katie Glynn; Stacey Carr; Ella Gunson; Beth Jurgeleit; Clarissa Eshuis; Lucy Talbot; Samantha Harrison; Gemma Flynn; Anna Thorpe; Natasha Fitzsimons; Charlotte Harrison; Stacey Michelsen; Anita Punt	England (ENG); Ashleigh Ball; Charlotte Craddock; Crista Cullen; Alex Danson; Susie Gilbert; Hannah Macleod; Helen Richardson; Chloe Rogers; Natalie Seymour; Beth Storry; Georgie Twigg; Laura Unsworth; Kate Walsh; Sally Walton; Nicola White; Kerry Williams
2014	Australia (AUS); Madonna Blyth; Edwina Bone; Jane Claxton; Casey Eastham; Anna Flanagan; Kate Jenner; Jodie Kenny; Rachael Lynch; Karri McMahon; Georgia Nanscawen; Ashleigh Nelson; Georgie Parker; Brooke Peris; Emily Smith; Jayde Taylor; Kellie White	England (ENG); Giselle Ansley; Sophie Bray; Alex Danson; Susie Gilbert; Maddie Hinch; Lily Owsley; Sam Quek; Kate Richardson-Walsh; Zoe Shipperley; Susannah Townsend; Georgie Twigg; Laura Unsworth; Ellie Watton; Hollie Webb; Nicola White; Lucy Wood	New Zealand (NZL); Sam Charlton; Sophie Cocks; Rhiannon Dennison; Gemma Flynn; Krystal Forgesson; Katie Glynn; Jordan Grant; Rose Keddell; Olivia Merry; Stacey Michelsen; Emily Naylor; Anita Punt; Sally Rutherford; Liz Thompson; Petrea Webster; Kayla Whitelock
2018	New Zealand (NZL); Tarryn Davey; Sam Harrison; Olivia Merry; Frances Davies; Amy Robinson; Sally Rutherford; Brooke Neal; Ella Gunson; Sam Charlton; Grace O'Hanlon; Liz Thompson; Rose Keddell; Kelsey Smith; Pippa Hayward; Shiloh Gloyn; Madison Doar; Stacey Michelsen; Anita McLaren	Australia (AUS); Gabrielle Nance; Brooke Peris; Emily Hurtz; Jodie Kenny; Karri McMahon; Edwina Bone; Stephanie Kershaw; Kaitlin Nobbs; Jordyn Holzberger; Jane Claxton; Jocelyn Bartram; Renee Taylor; Madi Ratcliffe; Ashlea Fey; Emily Smith; Rachael Lynch; Grace Stewart; Savannah Fitzpatrick	England (ENG); Maddie Hinch; Kathryn Lane; Laura Unsworth; Sarah Haycroft; Anna Toman; Hannah Martin; Susannah Townsend; Suzy Petty; Ellie Rayer; Alex Danson; Emily Defroand; Giselle Ansley; Sophie Bray; Hollie Pearne-Webb; Ellie Watton; Amy Tennant; Jo Hunter; Grace Balsdon
2022	England (ENG); Maddie Hinch; Laura Unsworth; Anna Toman; Hannah Martin; Holly Hunt; Lily Walker; Elena Rayer; Tessa Howard; Isabelle Petter; Giselle Ansley; Hollie Pearne-Webb; Fiona Crackles; Sophie Hamilton; Shona McCallin; Sabbie Heesh; Lily Owsley; Flora Peel; Grace Balsdon	Australia (AUS); Claire Colwill; Ambrosia Malone; Amy Lawton; Penny Squibb; Aleisha Power; Georgia Wilson; Shanea Tonkin; Madison Fitzpatrick; Greta Hayes; Stephanie Kershaw; Kaitlin Nobbs; Jane Claxton; Jocelyn Bartram; Karri Somerville; Renee Taylor; Mariah Williams; Rebecca Greiner; Grace Stewart	India (IND); Gurjit Kaur; Deep Grace Ekka; Monika Malik; Sonika Tandi; Sharmila Devi; Nikki Pradhan; Savita Punia; Rajani Etimarpu; Sangita Kumari; Nisha Warsi; Vandana Katariya; Udita Duhan; Lalremsiami; Jyoti; Navneet Kaur; Sushila Chanu; Salima Tete; Neha Goyal
