= 2010 Women's Hockey World Cup squads =

This article lists the confirmed squads for the 2010 Women's Hockey World Cup tournament held in Rosario, Argentina between August 29 and September 11, 2010.

== Pool A ==
=== Australia ===
Head coach: Frank Murray

No.	Player	Pos.	Age
1	Toni Cronk	GK	30
2	Georgia Nanscawen		18
4	Casey Eastham		21
5	Alison Bruce		22
6	Megan Rivers		29
7	Kim Walker		34
8	Ashleigh Nelson		23
10	Kate Hollywood		24
12	Madonna Blyth (c)		24

No.	Player	Pos.	Age
13	Shelly Liddelow		26
14	Nicole Arrold		28
15	Kobie McGurk		25
16	Fiona Johnson		27
21	Jayde Taylor		25
22	Kate Jenner		20
27	Rachael Lynch	GK	24
29	Teneal Attard		25
30	Amy Korner		24

=== Germany ===
Head coach: Michael Behrmann

No.	Player	Pos.	Age
2	Tina Bachmann (c)		32
4	Mandy Haase		28
7	Natascha Keller		33
8	Christina Schütze		26
10	Nina Hasselmann		24
11	Eileen Hoffmann		26
12	Lydia Haase		23
13	Katharina Otte		23
15	Hannah Krüger		21

No.	Player	Pos.	Age
16	Fanny Rinne		30
17	Barbara Vogel	GK	30
20	Lena Andersch		18
24	Maike Stöckel		26
25	Janne Müller-Wieland		23
26	Celine Wilde		20
28	Julia Müller		24
29	Lina Geyer		24
32	Kristina Reynolds	GK	26

=== India ===
Head coach: Sandeep Somesh

No.	Player	Pos.	Age
1	Dipika Murthy	GK	30
2	Binita Toppo		30
5	Asunta Lakra		24
6	Kirandeep Kaur		21
8	Chanchan Thokchom		22
9	Surinder Kaur (c)		28
11	Poonam Rani		17
13	Rajani Etimarpu	GK	20
14	Ritu Rani		18

No.	Player	Pos.	Age
16	Monika Badran		16
17	Deepika Thakur		23
18	Jasjeet Kaur Handa		22
19	Mukta Prava Barla		25
21	Yendala Soundarya		20
24	Saba Anjum Karim		25
25	Joydeep Kaur		21
28	Rani Rampal		15
30	Subhadra Pradhan		24

=== Japan ===
Head coach: Yasuda Zenjiiro

No.	Player	Pos.	Age
1	Sakiyo Asano	GK	23
3	Akemi Kato		39
4	Ai Murakami		25
5	Miyuki Nakagawa		23
6	Keiko Manabe		23
8	Yukari Yamamoto		29
9	Mie Nakashima		24
10	Rika Komazawa (c)		28
11	Kaori Chiba		29

No.	Player	Pos.	Age
12	Yuka Yoshikawa	GK	26
13	Nagisa Hayashi		24
15	Mazuki Arai		21
16	Kana Nagayama		21
18	Aki Yamada		17
20	Mayumi Ono		26
25	Yuri Nagai		18
26	Aki Mitsuhashi		20
22	Shiho Otsuka		20

=== Netherlands ===
Head coach: Herman Kruis

No.	Player	Pos.	Age
1	Floortje Engels	GK	28
5	Carlien Dirkse van den Heuvel		23
8	Marieke Mattheussens		26
9	Wieke Dijkstra		26
10	Kelly Jonker		20
11	Maartje Goderie		26
12	Lidewij Welten		20
13	Minke Smeets		31
15	Janneke Schopman		33

No.	Player	Pos.	Age
17	Maartje Paumen		24
18	Naomi van As		27
19	Ellen Hoog		24
21	Sophie Polkamp		26
22	Joyce Sombroek	GK	19
23	Kim Lammers		29
24	Eva de Goede		21
26	Michelle van der Pols		21
27	Marilyn Agliotti		31

=== New Zealand ===
Head coach: Mark Hager

No.	Player	Pos.	Age
1	Kayla Sharland (c)		24
2	Emily Naylor		24
3	Krystal Forgesson		27
5	Katie Glynn		21
7	Piki Hamahona		28
11	Stacey Carr		26
12	Ella Gunson		21
15	Beth Jurgeleit	GK	30
16	Clarissa Eshuis		23

No.	Player	Pos.	Age
17	Lucy Talbot		21
20	Samantha Harrison		19
22	Gemma Flynn		20
23	Anna Thorpe		26
26	Natasha Fitzsimons		21
28	Charlotte Harrison		21
30	Bianca Russell	GK	32
31	Stacey Michelsen		19
32	Anita Punt		22

== Pool B ==
=== Argentina ===
Head coach: Carlos Retegui

No.	Player	Pos.	Age
1	Belén Succi	GK	24
2	Mariana Rossi		31
4	Rosario Luchetti		26
5	Macarena Rodríguez		32
7	Alejandra Gulla		33
8	Luciana Aymar (c)		33
10	Soledad García		29
11	Carla Rebecchi		25
12	Delfina Merino		20

No.	Player	Pos.	Age
13	Laura Aladro	GK	27
14	Romina Vatteone		32
18	Daniela Sruoga		22
19	Mariné Russo		30
21	Mariela Scarone		23
24	Claudia Burkart		30
25	Silvina D'Elía		24
26	Giselle Kañevsky		25
27	Noel Barrionuevo		26

=== China ===
Head coach: Kim Sang Ryul

No.	Player	Pos.	Age
1	Ma Yibo		30
3	Huang Xuejiao		23
5	Ma Wei		21
6	Sun Sinan		20
7	Liao Jiahui		32
8	Fu Baorong (c)		32
9	Li Shuang		32
10	Gao Lihua		30
11	Wang Zhishuang		24

No.	Player	Pos.	Age
13	Sun Zhen		23
17	Li Hongxia		23
18	Ren Ye		24
21	Zhao Yudiao		21
22	Song Qingling		24
23	De Jiaojiao		20
25	Xu Xiaoxu		24
30	Li Dongxiao	GK	22
31	Zhang Lei	GK	25

=== England ===
Head coach: Danny Kerry

No.	Player	Pos.	Age
1	Beth Storry	GK	32
4	Laura Unsworth		22
5	Crista Cullen		25
6	Hannah Macleod		26
8	Helen Richardson		28
9	Natalie Seymour		23
10	Susie Gilbert		21
11	Kate Walsh (c)		30
12	Chloe Rogers		25

No.	Player	Pos.	Age
13	Kerry Williams		24
15	Alex Danson		25
16	Katie Long		22
18	Georgie Twigg		19
19	Charlotte Craddock		19
22	Ashleigh Ball		24
23	Sally Walton		29
28	Nicola White		22
29	Gemma Ible	GK	22

=== Korea ===
Head coach: Kang Keon-Wook

No.	Player	Pos.	Age
1	Moon Young-Hui	GK	27
3	Kim Young-Ran		25
5	Kim Bo-Mi		24
6	Park Seon-Mi		28
7	Lee Seon-Ok (c)		29
8	Kim Jong-Hee		24
9	Park Mi-Hyun		24
10	Gim Sung-Hee		27
11	Kim Jong-Eun		24

No.	Player	Pos.	Age
12	Kim Da-Rae		23
13	Cheon Seul-Ki		21
14	Jeon Yu-Mi		21
15	An Hyo-Ju		22
16	Jang Soo-Ji	GK	22
17	Kim Ok-Ju		22
18	Park Ki-Ju		20
19	Kim Eun-Sil		27
23	Kim Ah-Ra		20

=== South Africa ===
Head coach: Giles Bonnet

No.	Player	Pos.	Age
1	Mariette Rix	GK	19
8	Marsha Marescia (c)		27
10	Shelley Russell		23
11	Marcelle Keet		25
12	Dirkie Chamberlain		23
13	Lisa-Marie Deetlefs		22
14	Kelly Madsen		21
15	Pietie Coetzee		31
16	Jennifer Wilson		31

No.	Player	Pos.	Age
17	Lesle-Ann George		24
18	Vida Ryan		26
21	Lenise Marais		25
22	Kathleen Taylor		25
24	Cindy Botha		25
25	Hattingh Hanli	GK	20
26	Kim Hubach		26
29	Tarryn Bright		27
30	Sulette Damons		20

=== Spain ===
Head coach: Pablo Usoz

No.	Player	Pos.	Age
1	María López	GK	26
2	Julia Menéndez		25
3	Rocío Ybarra		25
6	Berta Bonastre		18
7	Carlota Petchame		20
8	Montse Cruz		30
9	Silvia Muñoz		30
10	Silvia Bonastre		28
11	Empar Gil		22

No.	Player	Pos.	Age
12	Rocio Gutierrez		25
13	Raquel Huertas		28
14	Pilar Sánchez		28
15	Anabel Flores		27
16	Isabel Barguno		29
17	Núria Camón (c)		30
18	Olalla Pineiro		26
22	Gloria Comerma		23
23	Georgina Oliva		20
