= Hockey at the 2010 Commonwealth Games – Women's team squads =

This article lists the squads of the women's hockey competition at the 2010 Commonwealth Games held in New Delhi, India from 4 to 13 October 2010.

== Pool A ==
=== Australia ===
The squad was announced on 17 September 2010.

Head coach: Frank Murray

1. Toni Cronk (GK)
2. Fiona Boyce
3. Emily Hurtz
4. Casey Eastham
5. Alison Bruce
6. Megan Rivers
7. Kate Jenner
8. Ashleigh Nelson
9. Rachael Lynch (GK)
10. Kate Hollywood
11. Jayde Taylor
12. Madonna Blyth (C)
13. Shelly Liddelow
14. Nicole Arrold
15. Anna Flanagan
16. Fiona Johnson

=== India ===
Head coach: Sandeep Somesh

1. Dipika Murthy (GK)
2. Binita Toppo
3. Subhadra Pradhan
4. Ritu Rani
5. Mukta Prava Barla
6. Deepika Thakur
7. Kirandeep Kaur
8. Rani Rampal
9. Surinder Kaur (C)
10. Saba Anjum
11. Jasjeet Kaur Handa
12. Rajani Etimarpu (GK)
13. Asunta Lakra
14. Joydeep Kaur
15. Poonam Rani
16. Chanchan Devi Thokchom

=== Scotland ===
The squad was announced on 24 August 2010.

Head coach: Gordon Shepherd

1. Abigail Walker (GK)
2. Morag McLellan
3. Victoria Bunce
4. Louise Baxter
5. Alison Bell
6. Emily Maguire
7. Nicola Kidd
8. Catriona Forrest
9. Samantha Judge
10. Aimee Clarke
11. Holly Cram
12. Linda Clement (C)
13. Ailsa Robertson
14. Kareena Marshall
15. Leigh Fawcett
16. Rebecca Merchant

=== South Africa ===
The squad was announced on 21 July 2010.

Head coach: Giles Bonnet

1. Vuyisanani Mangisa (GK)
2. Lenise Marais
3. Pietie Coetzee
4. Farah Fredericks
5. Nicolene Terblanche
6. Tarryn Bright
7. Leslie-Ann George
8. Marsha Marescia (C)
9. Sulette Damons
10. Kathleen Taylor
11. Marcelle Keet
12. Dirkie Chamberlain
13. Lisa-Marié Deetlefs
14. Kelly Madsen
15. Kimberly Hubach
16. Jennifer Wilson

=== Trinidad and Tobago ===
Head coach: Anthony Marcano

1. Petal Derry (GK)
2. Sarayahu Plaza (GK)
3. Blair Wynne
6. Curlyne Wynne
7. Nicole Aming
8. Arielle Ramchand-Du Quesnay
10. Stacey-Ann Siu Butt
11. Alanna Lewis
15. Sekayi Liburd
16. Michelle Leotaud
17. Brittney Hingh
18. Patricia Wright-Alexis (C)
20. Kristin Thompson
21. Charlene Williams
22. Kelli O'Brien
23. Mauricia Nicholson

== Pool B ==
=== Canada ===
The squad was announced on 17 August 2010.

Head coach: Louis Mendonca

2. Amanda Stone (GK)
3. Katherine Gillis
4. Katie Collinson
5. Alexandra Lee
8. Stephanie Jameson
12. Thea Culley
13. Stephanie Nesbitt (C)
14. Katie Baker
15. Abigail Raye
16. Diana Roemer
17. Robyn Pendleton
18. Tyla Flexman
19. Stephanie Smith
20. Kristine Wishart
27. Anna Kozniuk
32. Azelia Liu (GK)

=== England ===
The squad was announced on 20 August 2010.

Head coach: Daniel Kerry

1. Elizabeth Storry (GK)
4. Laura Unsworth
5. Crista Cullen
6. Hannah Macleod
8. Helen Richardson
9. Natalie Seymour
10. Susannah Gilbert
11. Kate Walsh (C)
12. Chloe Rogers
13. Kerry Williams
15. Alexandra Danson
18. Georgina Twigg
19. Charlotte Craddock
22. Ashleigh Ball
23. Sally Walton
28. Nicola White

=== Malaysia ===
Head coach: Atan Yahya

1. Ayuni Yahya (GK)
2. Fazilla Silin
3. Siti Othman
4. Sebah Kari
5. Hasliza Ali
6. Rabiatul Mohamed
7. Siti Ruhani
8. Juliani Din
9. Norfaraha Hashim
10. Catherine Lambor
11. Norhasikin Halim
12. Norazlin Sumantri
13. Nuraini Rashid
14. Nadia Rahman (C)
15. Norbaini Hashim
16. Siti Zainordin (GK)

=== New Zealand ===
The squad was announced on 12 August 2010.

Head coach: (Australia) Mark Hager

1. Kayla Sharland (C)
2. Emily Naylor
3. Krystal Forgesson
5. Katie Glynn
11. Stacey Carr
12. Elizabeth Gunson
15. Elizabeth Jurgeleit (GK)
16. Clarissa Eshuis
17. Lucy Talbot
20. Samantha Harrison
22. Gemma Flynn
23. Anna Thorpe
26. Natasha FitzSimons
28. Charlotte Harrison
31. Stacey Michelsen
32. Anita Punt

=== Wales ===
The squad was announced on 17 August 2010.

Head coach: Joanna Nightingale

1. Margaret Rees (GK)
3. Dawn Mitchell
4. Emma Batten
5. Claire Lowry
6. Alys Brooks
7. Katrin Budd
8. Carys Hopkins
9. Emma Griffiths
10. Philippa Jones (C)
11. Abigail Welsford
12. Elen Mumford
13. Louise Pugh-Bevan
15. Natalie Blyth
16. Ella Rafferty
17. Leah Wilkinson
18. Sarah Thomas
