= Field hockey at the 2012 Summer Olympics – Women's team squads =

Twelve national teams competed in the women's Olympic hockey tournament at the 2012 Summer Olympics in London. Sixteen players were officially enrolled in each squad. Two reserve players could also be nominated to be available should a player enrolled in the official squad become injured during the tournament.

== Pool A ==
=== Netherlands ===
The following is the Netherlands roster in the women's field hockey tournament of the 2012 Summer Olympics.

Head Coach: Maximiliano Caldas

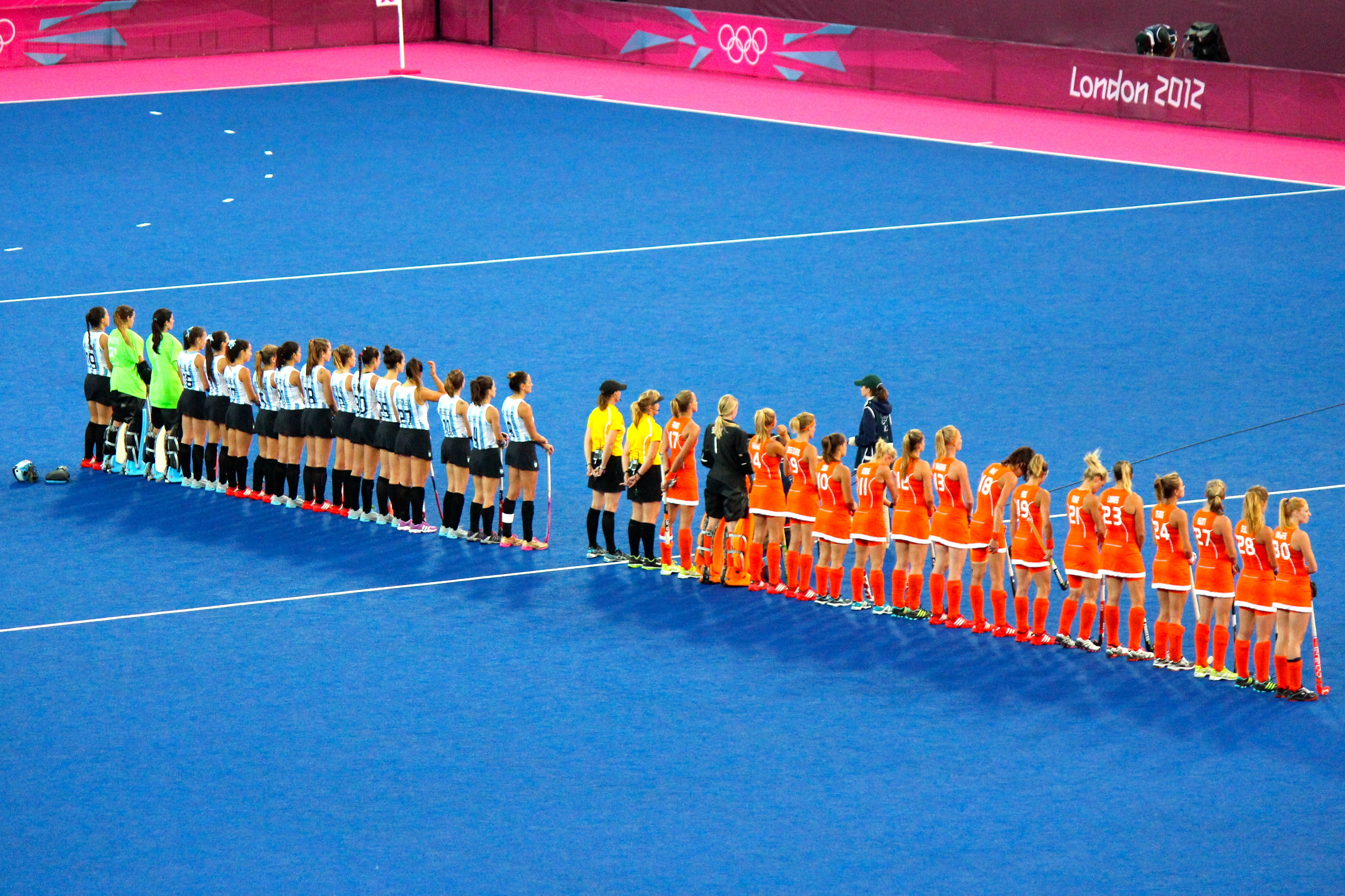
Netherlands women's hockey team (in orange) before the final against Argentina

1. Joyce Sombroek (GK)
4. Kitty van Male
7. ~~Willemijn Bos~~^
9. Carlien Dirkse van den Heuvel
10. Kelly Jonker
11. Maartje Goderie
12. Lidewij Welten
13. Caia van Maasakker
17. Maartje Paumen (C)
18. Naomi van As
19. Ellen Hoog
21. Sophie Polkamp
23. Kim Lammers
24. Eva de Goede
27. Marilyn Agliotti
28. Merel de Blaeij
30. Margot van Geffen

Reserves:

- Floortje Engels (GK)
- Marieke Veenhoven-Mattheussens

^ Willemijn Bos injured her cruciate ligament during a friendly match.

=== Great Britain ===
The Great Britain women's field hockey team for the 2012 Games was announced on 18 May 2012.

Head Coach: Danny Kerry

1. Beth Storry (GK)
3. Emily Maguire
4. Laura Unsworth
5. Crista Cullen
6. Hannah Macleod
7. Anne Panter
8. Helen Richardson
11. Kate Walsh (C)
12. Chloe Rogers
14. Laura Bartlett
15. Alex Danson
18. Georgie Twigg
22. Ashleigh Ball
23. Sally Walton
28. Nicola White
29. Sarah Thomas

Reserves:

- Natalie Seymour
- Abi Walker

=== China ===
The following is the Chinese roster in the women's field hockey tournament of the 2012 Summer Olympics.

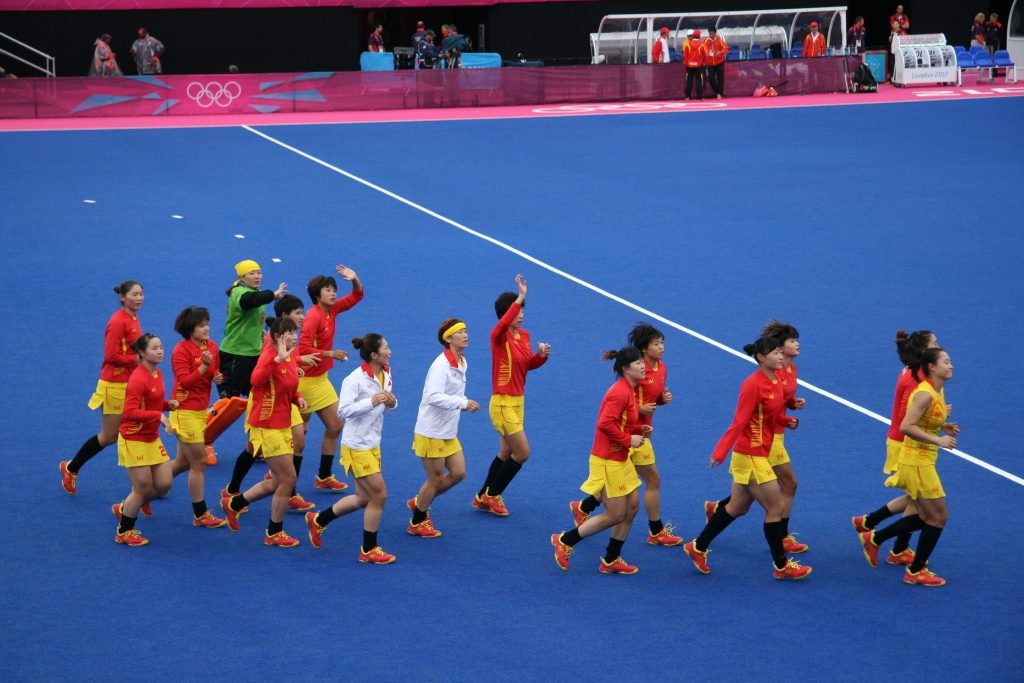
China women's hockey team, after the match against Belgium

1. Ma Yibo
2. Wang Mengyu
5. Ma Wei
6. Sun Sinan
7. Cui Qiuxia
8. Fu Baorong
10. Gao Lihua
16. Zhang Yimeng (GK)
17. Li Hongxia
18. Ren Ye (C)
21. Zhao Yudiao
22. Song Qingling
23. De Jiaojiao
25. Xu Xiaoxu
28. Liang Meiyu
29. Peng Yang

Reserves:

- Li Dongxiao (GK)
- Tang Chunling

=== South Korea ===
The following is the South Korea roster in the women's field hockey tournament of the 2012 Summer Olympics.

Head Coach: Lim Heung-sin

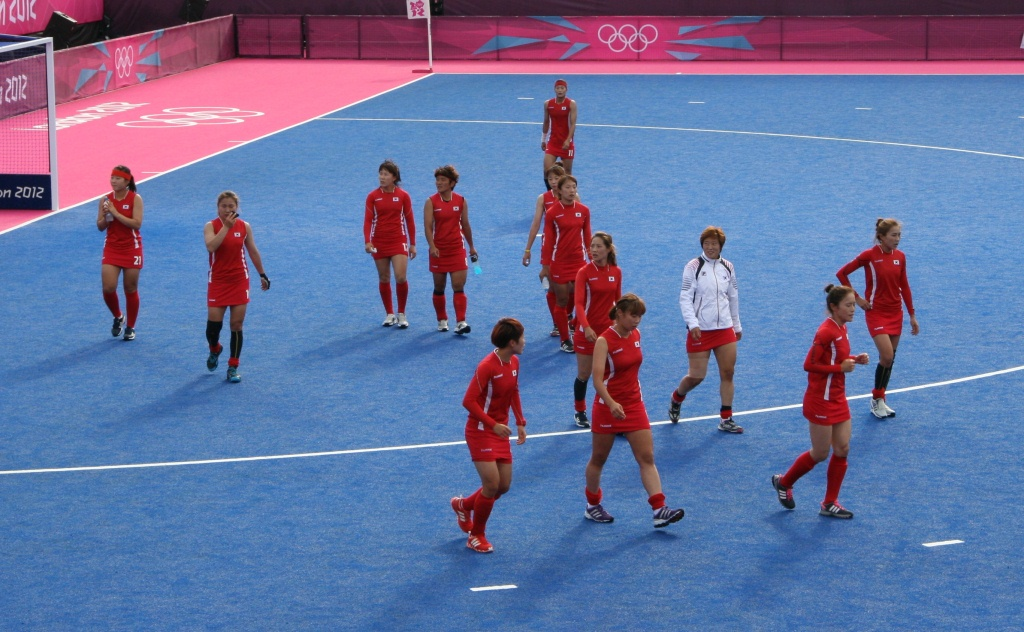
South Korea women's team after the match against Great Britain

1. Moon Young-hui (GK)
4. Kim Young-ran
5. Cha Se-na
6. Park Seon-mi
7. Lee Seon-ok (C)
8. Park Mi-hyun
9. Han Hye-lyoung
10. Kim Jong-hee
11. Kim Jong-eun
12. Kim Da-rae
13. Cheon Seul-ki
14. Jeon Yu-mi
17. Kim Ok-ju
21. Park Ki-ju
22. Jang Soo-ji (GK)
23. Cheon Eun-bi

Reserves:

- Cho Eun-ji
- Hong Yoo-jin

=== Japan ===
The following is the Japan roster in the women's field hockey tournament of the 2012 Summer Olympics.

Head Coach: Zenjiro Yasuda

1. Sakiyo Asano (GK)
2. Nagisa Hayashi
3. Akemi Kato
4. Sachimi Iwao
5. Miyuki Nakagawa
6. Ai Murakami
7. Shiho Otsuka
8. Yukari Yamamoto (C)
9. Aki Mitsuhashi
10. Rika Komazawa
11. Kaori Fujio
12. Akane Shibata
13. Chie Akutsu
14. Keiko Manabe
17. Masako Sato
21. Izuki Tanaka

Reserves:

- Mika Imura
- Ryoko Oie (GK)

=== Belgium ===
The following is the Belgium roster in the women's field hockey tournament of the 2012 Summer Olympics.

Head Coach: Pascal Kina

3. Louise Cavenaile
5. Stephanie de Groof
6. Anouk Raes
7. Judith Vandermeiren
9. Lieselotte van Lindt
10. Lola Danhaive
11. Erica Coppey
12. Gaëlle Valcke
13. Alix Gerniers
14. Emilie Sinia
15. Charlotte de Vos (C)
17. Anne-Sophie van Regemortel
19. Barbara Nelen
21. Aisling D'Hooghe (GK)
22. Hélène Delmée
27. Jill Boon

Reserves:

- Nadine Khouzam (GK)
- Valerie Vermeersch

== Pool B ==
=== Argentina ===
The following is the Argentina roster in the women's field hockey tournament of the 2012 Summer Olympics.

Head Coach: Carlos Retegui

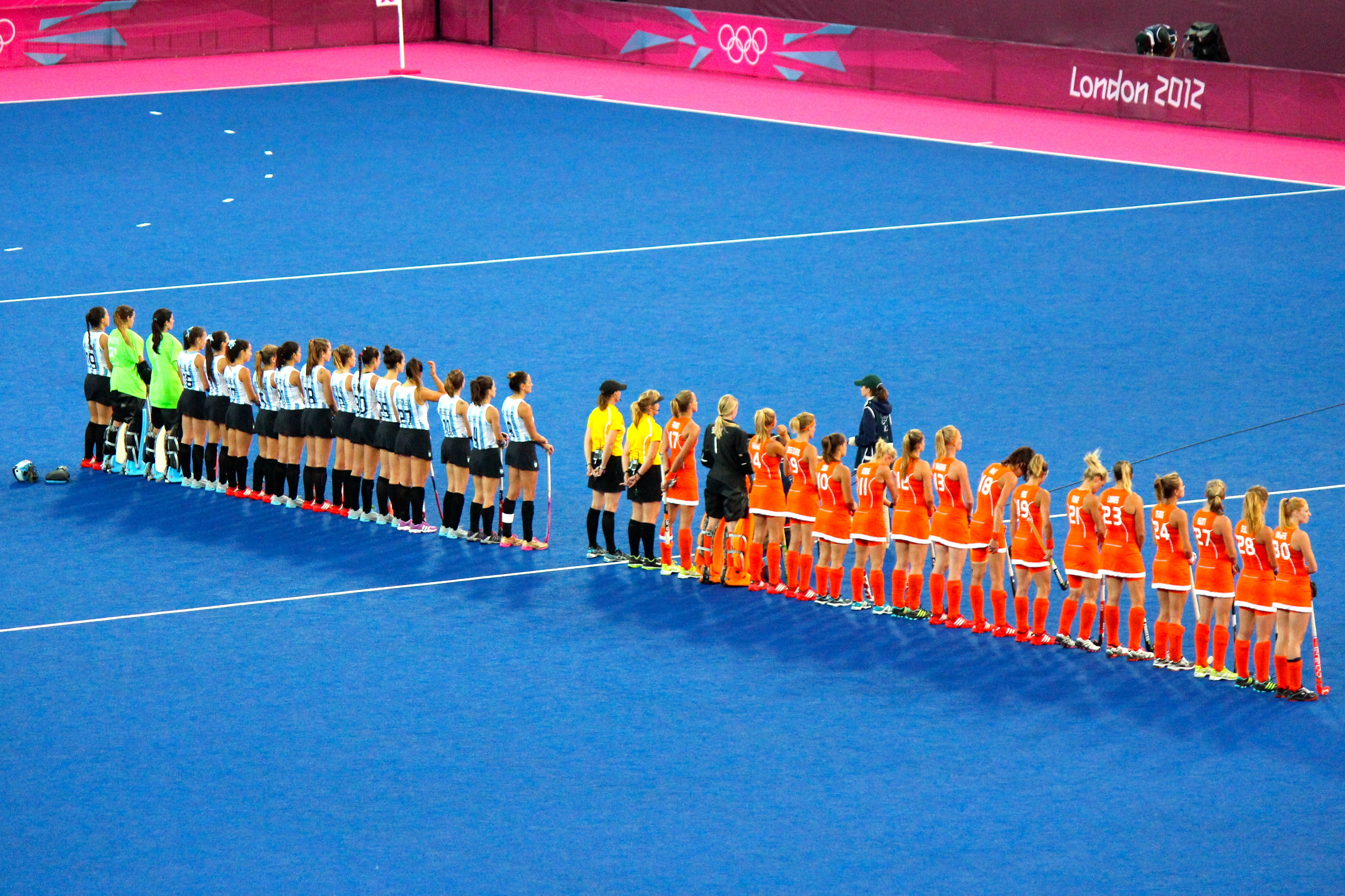
Argentina women's hockey team (in white/blue) before the final against Netherlands

1. Laura del Colle (GK)
4. Rosario Luchetti
5. Macarena Rodríguez
7. Martina Cavallero
8. Luciana Aymar (C)
11. Carla Rebecchi
12. Delfina Merino
16. Florencia Habif
17. Rocío Sánchez Moccia
18. Daniela Sruoga
19. Sofía Maccari
21. Mariela Scarone
25. Silvina D'Elía
27. Noel Barrionuevo
30. Josefina Sruoga
31. Florencia Mutio (GK)

Reserves:

- Julieta Franco
- Carla Dupuy

=== Germany ===
The following is the Germany roster in the women's field hockey tournament of the 2012 Summer Olympics.

Head Coach: Michael Behrmann

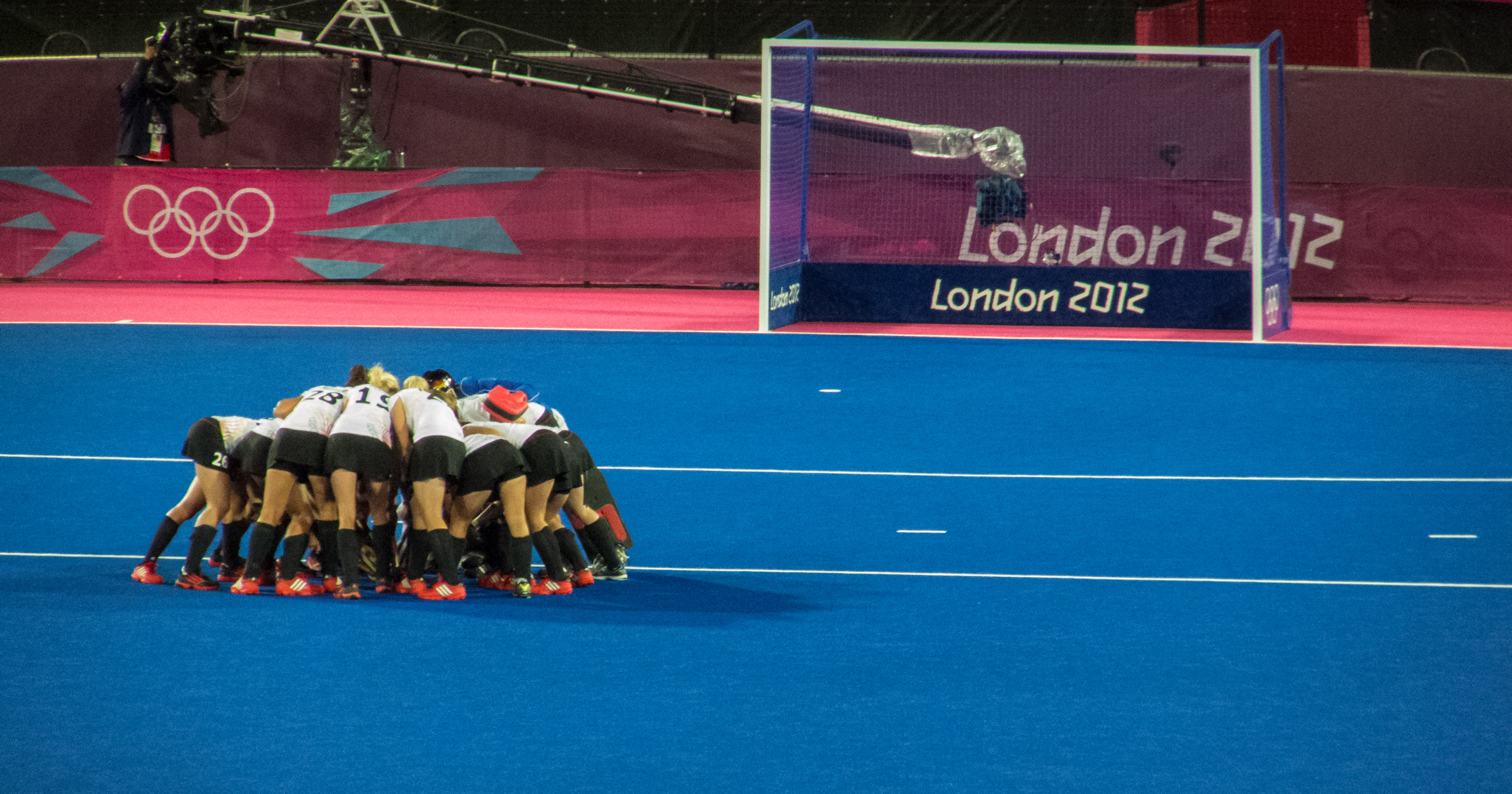
German team before the match against Argentina

1. Yvonne Frank (GK)
4. Mandy Haase
7. Natascha Keller
8. Christina Schütze
9. Kristina Hillmann
10. Nina Hasselmann
13. Katharina Otte
16. Fanny Rinne (C)
18. Lisa Hahn
19. Jennifer Plass
23. Marie Mavers
24. Maike Stöckel
25. Janne Müller-Wieland
26. Celine Wilde
27. Anke Brockmann
28. Julia Müller

Reserves:

- Kristina Reynolds (GK)
- Jana Teschke

=== New Zealand ===
The following is the New Zealand roster in the women's field hockey tournament of the 2012 Summer Olympics.

Head Coach: Mark Hager

1. Kayla Sharland
2. Emily Naylor (C)
3. Krystal Forgesson
5. Katie Glynn
9. Alana Millington
12. Ella Gunson
13. Samantha Charlton
16. Clarissa Eshuis
20. Samantha Harrison
21. Cathryn Finlayson
22. Gemma Flynn
28. Charlotte Harrison
29. Melody Cooper
30. Bianca Russell (GK)
31. Stacey Michelsen
32. Anita Punt

Reserves:

- Julia King
- Sally Rutherford (GK)

=== Australia ===
The following is the Australian roster in the women's field hockey tournament of the 2012 Summer Olympics.

Head Coach: Adam Commens

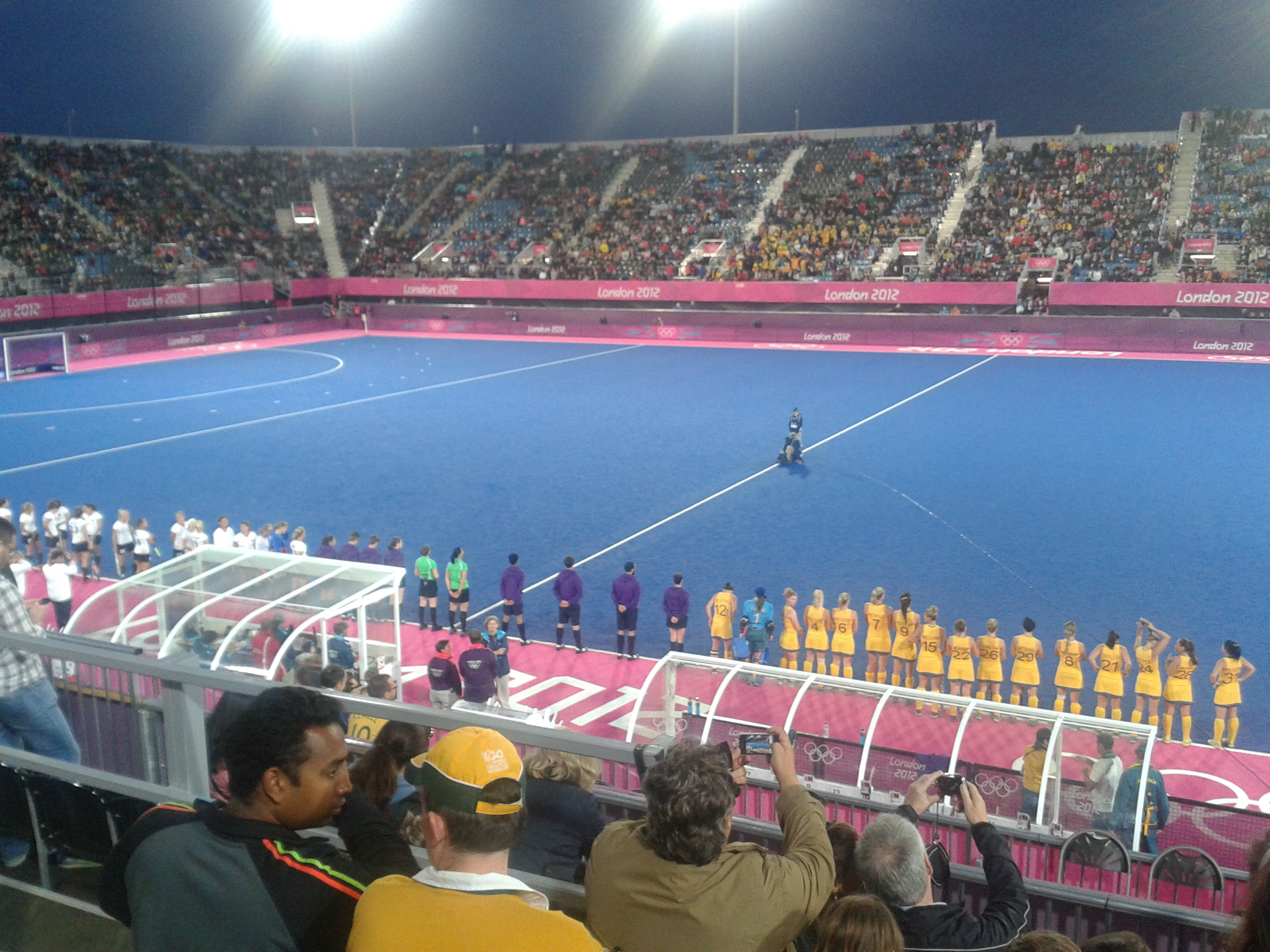
Australian team (in yellow) before the match versus Germany

1. Toni Cronk (GK)
2. Georgia Nanscawen
4. Casey Eastham
6. Megan Rivers
7. Jodie Schulz
8. Ashleigh Nelson
9. Anna Flanagan
12. Madonna Blyth (C)
15. Kobie McGurk
21. Jayde Taylor
22. Kate Jenner
24. Fiona Boyce
26. Emily Smith
28. Hope Munro
29. Teneal Attard
31. Jade Close

Reserves:

- Emily Hurtz
- Ashlee Wells (GK)

=== United States ===
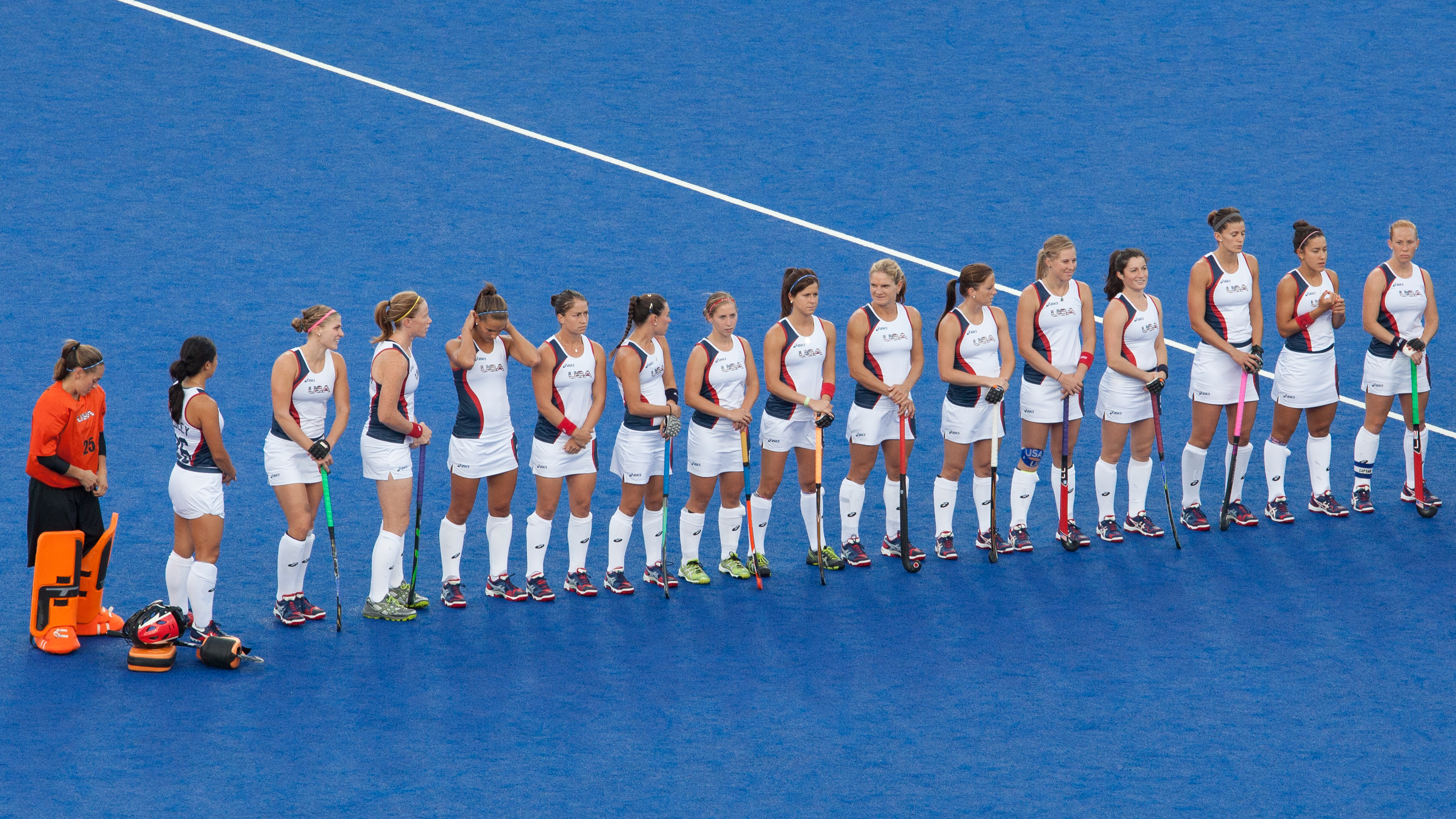
Team USA

The following is the American roster in the women's field hockey tournament of the 2012 Summer Olympics.

Head Coach: Lee Bodimeade

5. Melissa González
8. Rachel Dawson
9. Michelle Vittese
11. Shannon Taylor
12. Julia Reinprecht
13. Keli Smith Puzo
14. Katie Reinprecht
16. Katie O'Donnell
18. Michelle Kasold
19. Caroline Nichols
20. Paige Selenski
21. Claire Laubach
23. Katelyn Falgowski
25. Amy Swensen (GK)
26. Kayla Bashore Smedley
27. Lauren Crandall

Reserves:

- Michelle Cesan
- Jaclyn Kintzer (GK)

=== South Africa ===
The following is the South Africa roster in the women's field hockey tournament of the 2012 Summer Olympics.

Head Coach: Giles Bonnet

1. Mariette Rix (GK)
3. Kate Woods
7. Illse Davids
8. Marsha Marescia (C)
10. Shelley Russell
12. Dirkie Chamberlain
13. Lisa-Marie Deetlefs
15. Pietie Coetzee
16. Jennifer Wilson
17. Lesle-Ann George
20. Nicolene Terblanche
21. Lenise Marais
22. Kathleen Taylor
23. Bernadette Coston
29. Tarryn Bright
30. Sulette Damons

Reserves:

- Vuyisanani Mangisa (GK)
- Lauren Penny
