= Australia women's national field hockey squad records =

Australia
- Nickname(s): Hockeyroos
- Association: Hockey Australia
- Confederation: OHF (Oceania)
- Head Coach: Katrina Powell

FIH ranking
- Current: 9 (3 October 2026)

The following article comprises past and present players and results of the Hockeyroos, the national women's field hockey team from Australia. The team is controlled by Hockey Australia and competes in FIH sanctioned tournaments.

== Team ==
=== Technical staff ===
Head Coach: Rhett Halkett
Assistant Coaches: Emma Murray and Hugh Purvis

=== Current squad ===
The following 24 players were named in the Hockeyroos 2026 squad.

Caps and goals are current as of 7 September 2025 after the match against New Zealand.

Head coach: (South Africa) Rhett Halkett

No.	Pos.	Player	Date of birth (age)	Caps	Goals	Club
7	GK	Aleisha Power	1 January 1997 (age 29)	51	0	(Western Australia) Perth Thundersticks
19	GK	Jocelyn Bartram	4 May 1993 (age 33)	117	0	(New South Wales) NSW Pride
25	GK	Zoe Newman	28 July 1999 (age 27)	21	0	(New South Wales) NSW Pride
2	DF	Casey Dolkens	8 January 2000 (age 26)	0	0	(Queensland) Brisbane Blaze
15	DF	Kaitlin Nobbs (captain)	24 September 1997 (age 29)	156	12	(New South Wales) NSW Pride
17	DF	Lucy Sharman	24 May 2003 (age 23)	32	0	(South Australia) Adelaide Fire
18	DF	Alana Kavanagh	24 March 2003 (age 23)	20	0	(New South Wales) NSW Pride
20	DF	Karri Somerville	7 April 1999 (age 27)	76	0	(Western Australia) Perth Thundersticks
22	DF	Tatum Stewart	22 February 2002 (age 24)	44	10	(Queensland) Brisbane Blaze
1	MF	Claire Colwill (captain)	19 September 2003 (age 23)	77	6	(Queensland) Brisbane Blaze
3	MF	Morgan Mathison	12 April 2000 (age 26)	17	1	(Queensland) Brisbane Blaze
4	MF	Amy Lawton	19 January 2002 (age 24)	95	5	(Victoria (state)) HC Melbourne
5	MF	Grace Young	23 August 2002 (age 24)	59	1	(New South Wales) NSW Pride
6	MF	Sarah Byrnes	19 October 2000 (age 26)	0	0	(Western Australia) Perth Thundersticks
12	MF	Greta Hayes	17 October 1996 (age 30)	69	5	(New South Wales) NSW Pride
14	MF	Stephanie Kershaw	19 April 1995 (age 31)	126	31	(Tasmania) Tassie Tigers
23	MF	Olivia Downes	18 December 2000 (age 25)	3	0	(Victoria (state)) HC Melbourne
10	FW	Abigail Wilson	27 June 1998 (age 28)	29	1	(New South Wales) NSW Pride
11	FW	Alice Arnott	25 February 1998 (age 28)	31	9	(New South Wales) NSW Pride
13	FW	Makayla Jones	20 July 2004 (age 22)	0	0	(New South Wales) NSW Pride
21	FW	Jade Smith	16 February 2001 (age 25)	13	5	(Queensland) Brisbane Blaze
24	FW	Mariah Williams	31 May 1995 (age 31)	156	26	(New South Wales) NSW Pride
30	FW	Grace Stewart (captain)	28 April 1997 (age 29)	144	39	(New South Wales) NSW Pride
31	FW	Neasa Flynn	13 August 2001 (age 25)	0	0	(Western Australia) Perth Thundersticks

=== Development squad ===
In addition to the core 24 player squad, Hockey Australia also maintains a 17 player development squad. The 2026 squad is as follows:

- Maddison Brooks
- Hannah Cullum-Sanders
- Dayle Dolkens
- Rebecca Greiner
- Bridget Laurance (GK)
- Phillipa Morgan
- Lexie Pickering
- Jesse Reid
- Courtney Schonell
- Jolie Sertorio
- Alyssa Smith (GK)
- Maddison Smith
- Georgina Smithers
- Jamie-Lee Surha
- Caitlyn Templeman
- Zali Ward
- Georgina West

== Past squads ==
- Note: This article does not comprise squads prior to the year 2001.

=== 2001–2010 ===
2001 National Squad

Head coach: David Bell
The 2001 national squad comprised the following 27 players:

2. Louise Dobson
3. Karen Smith
4. Alyson Annan
5. Ngaire Smith
7. Peta Gallagher
9. Kimberley Walker
10. Bianca Netzler
11. Emily Halliday
12. Brooke Morrison
13. Wendy Alcorn
15. Denise Durajski
16. Justine Sowry (GK)
17. Rachel Imison (GK)
18. Kristen Towers
19. Cindy Morgan (GK)
20. Carmel Souter
21. Nina Bonner (GK)
22. Alexandra Lupton
23. Joanne Banning
24. Angela Skirving
25. Melanie Twitt
26. Megan Sargeant
28. Julie Towers
29. Tammy Cole
30. Sarah Taylor
31. Katrina Powell (C)
32. Nicole Hudson
2002 National Squad

Head coach: David Bell
The 2002 national squad comprised the following 24 players:

1. Toni Cronk (GK)
2. Louise Dobson
3. Karen Smith
5. Ngaire Smith
6. Bianca Langham-Pritchard
7. Peta Gallagher
10. Bianca Netzler
11. Emily Halliday
12. Brooke Morrison
13. Wendy Alcorn
14. Nicole Arrold
16. Cindy Morgan (GK)
17. Rachel Imison (GK)
20. Carmel Bakurski
21. Nina Bonner (GK)
23. Joanne Banning
24. Angela Skirving
25. Melanie Twitt
26. Megan Sargeant
28. Julie Towers
29. Tammy Cole
30. Sarah Taylor
31. Katrina Powell (C)
32. Nicole Hudson
2003 National Squad

Head coach: David Bell
The 2003 national squad comprised the following 24 players:

1. Toni Cronk (GK)
2. Louise Dobson
3. Karen Smith
5. Ngaire Smith
6. Megan Rivers
7. Peta Gallagher
8. Susannah Harris
10. Bianca Netzler
11. Emily Halliday
13. Wendy Alcorn
14. Nicole Arrold
15. Denise Durajski
16. Cindy Morgan (GK)
17. Rachel Imison (GK)
19. Donna-Lee Patrick
20. Carmel Bakurski
22. Katie Allen
24. Angela Skirving
25. Melanie Twitt
27. Suzanne Faulkner
28. Julie Towers
30. Sarah Taylor
31. Katrina Powell (C)
32. Nicole Hudson
2004 National Squad

Head coach: David Bell
The 2004 national squad comprised the following 24 players:

1. Toni Cronk (GK)
2. Louise Dobson
3. Karen Smith
5. Ngaire Smith
6. Megan Rivers
7. Peta Gallagher
8. Susannah Harris
10. Bianca Netzler
11. Emily Halliday
13. Wendy Alcorn
14. Nicole Arrold
16. Cindy Morgan (GK)
17. Rachel Imison (GK)
19. Donna-Lee Patrick
20. Carmel Bakurski
21. Hope Brown
22. Katie Allen
24. Angela Skirving
25. Melanie Twitt
27. Suzanne Faulkner
28. Julie Towers
30. Sarah Taylor
31. Katrina Powell (C)
32. Nicole Hudson
2005 National Squad

Head coach: Frank Murray
The 2005 national squad comprised the following 24 players:

1. Toni Cronk (GK)
2. Suzanne Faulkner
3. Karen Smith
5. Ngaire Smith
6. Megan Rivers
8. Susannah Harris
9. Rebecca Sanders
10. Kate Hollywood
11. Emily Halliday
12. Madonna Blyth
13. Wendy Alcorn
14. Nicole Arrold
15. Kobie McGurk
16. Fiona Johnson
17. Rachel Imison (GK)
18. Emma Meyer
19. Donna-Lee Patrick
22. Amy Korner
24. Angela Skirving
25. Melanie Twitt
26. Ursula Ditton
29. Teneal Attard
30. Sarah Taylor
32. Nicole Hudson (C)
2006 National Squad

Head coach: Frank Murray
The 2006 national squad comprised the following 24 players:

1. Toni Cronk (GK)
2. Suzanne Faulkner
3. Karen Smith
4. Casey Eastham
5. Peta Gallagher
7. Kimberley Walker
9. Rebecca Sanders
10. Kate Hollywood
11. Emily Halliday
12. Madonna Blyth
13. Wendy Beattie
14. Nicole Arrold
15. Kobie McGurk
16. Fiona Johnson
17. Rachel Imison (GK)
18. Emma Meyer
19. Donna-Lee Patrick
21. De-Anne Gilbert (GK)
22. Amy Korner
24. Angela Skirving
25. Melanie Twitt
29. Teneal Attard
30. Sarah Taylor
32. Nicole Hudson (C)
2007 National Squad

Head coach: Frank Murray
The 2007 national squad comprised the following 24 players:

1. Toni Cronk (GK)
2. Suzanne Faulkner
4. Casey Eastham
5. Peta Gallagher
7. Kimberley Walker
9. Rebecca Sanders
10. Kate Hollywood
11. Emily Halliday
12. Madonna Blyth
13. Shelly Liddelow
14. Nicole Arrold
15. Kobie McGurk
16. Fiona Johnson
17. Rachel Imison (GK)
18. Emma Stewart
22. Amy Korner
23. Renee Trost
24. Angela Lambert
25. Melanie Twitt
27. Rachael Lynch (GK)
28. Hope Munro
29. Teneal Attard
30. Sarah Taylor
32. Nicole Hudson (C)
2008 National Squad

Head coach: Frank Murray
The 2008 national squad comprised the following 25 players:

1. Toni Cronk (GK)
2. Suzanne Faulkner
3. Wendy Beattie
4. Casey Eastham
6. Megan Rivers
7. Kimberley Walker
8. Ashleigh Nelson
9. Rebecca Sanders
10. Kate Hollywood
11. Emily Halliday
12. Madonna Blyth
13. Shelly Liddelow
14. Nicole Arrold
15. Kobie McGurk
16. Fiona Johnson
17. Rachel Imison (GK)
18. Emma Stewart
23. Renee Trost
24. Angela Lambert
25. Melanie Wells
27. Rachael Lynch (GK)
28. Hope Munro
29. Teneal Attard
30. Sarah Young
32. Nicole Hudson (C)
2009 National Squad

Head coach: Frank Murray
The 2009 national squad comprised the following 26 players:

1. Toni Cronk (GK)
2. Georgia Nanscawen
3. Sarah O'Conner
4. Casey Eastham
5. Alison Bruce
6. Megan Rivers
7. Kimberley Walker
8. Ashleigh Nelson
9. Anna Flanagan
10. Kate Hollywood
11. Emily Halliday
12. Madonna Blyth
14. Nicole Arrold
15. Kobie McGurk
16. Fiona Johnson
17. Emily Hurtz
18. Stacia Joseph
19. Heather Langham
20. Danielle Schubach
21. De-Anne Gilbert (GK)
22. Airlie Ogilvie
26. Jane Bennett
27. Rachael Lynch (GK)
28. Hope Munro
29. Teneal Attard
31. Claire Messent
2010 National Squad

Head coach: Frank Murray
The 2010 national squad comprised the following 26 players:

1. Toni Cronk (GK)
2. Georgia Nanscawen
3. Sarah O'Conner
4. Casey Eastham
5. Alison Bruce
6. Megan Rivers
7. Kimberley Walker
8. Ashleigh Nelson
9. Anna Flanagan
10. Kate Hollywood
12. Madonna Blyth
13. Shelly Liddelow
14. Nicole Arrold
15. Kobie McGurk
16. Fiona Johnson
17. Emily Hurtz
18. Stacia Joseph
19. Heather Langham
21. Jayde Taylor
22. Kate Jenner
24. Fiona Boyce
25. Kathryn Hubble (GK)
26. Jane Bennett
27. Rachael Lynch (GK)
28. Teneal Attard
29. Amy Korner

=== 2011–2020 ===
2011 National Squad

Head coach: Adam Commens
The 2011 national squad comprised the following 30 players:

1. Toni Cronk (GK)
2. Georgia Nanscawen
3. Bianca Greenshields
4. Casey Eastham
5. Renee Trost
6. Megan Rivers
7. Jodie Schulz
8. Ashleigh Nelson
9. Anna Flanagan
11. Jacklyn McRae
12. Madonna Blyth (C)
14. Jill Dwyer
15. Kobie McGurk
16. Kellie White
17. Emily Hurtz
18. Stacia Joseph
19. Heather Langham
20. Marnie Hudson
21. Jayde Taylor
22. Kate Jenner
23. Kandice Olivieri
24. Fiona Boyce
25. Jade Warrender
26. Hollie Webster
27. Rachael Lynch (GK)
28. Georgina Parker
29. Teneal Attard
30. Elise Stacy
31. Jade Close
32. Holly Evans
2012 National Squad

Head coach: Adam Commens
The 2012 national squad comprised the following 27 players:

1. Toni Cronk (GK)
2. Georgia Nanscawen
3. Bianca Greenshields
4. Casey Eastham
5. Ashlee Wells (GK)
6. Megan Rivers
7. Jodie Schulz
8. Ashleigh Nelson
9. Anna Flanagan
11. Jacklyn McRae
12. Madonna Blyth (C)
15. Kobie McGurk
16. Kellie White
17. Emily Hurtz
18. Stacia Joseph
20. Marnie Hudson
21. Jayde Taylor
22. Kate Jenner
23. Claire Messent
24. Fiona Boyce
25. Jade Warrender
26. Emily Smith
27. Rachael Lynch (GK)
28. Hope Munro
29. Teneal Attard
31. Jade Close
32. Holly Evans
2013 National Squad

Head coach: Adam Commens
The 2013 national squad comprised the following 27 players:

1. Toni Cronk (GK)
2. Georgia Nanscawen
3. Bianca Greenshields
4. Casey Eastham
5. Ashlee Wells (GK)
6. Kirstin Johnson
7. Jodie Schulz
8. Ashleigh Nelson
9. Anna Flanagan
11. Karri McMahon
12. Madonna Blyth (C)
15. Kobie McGurk
16. Kellie White
17. Emily Hurtz
18. Jane Claxton
19. Georgina Parker
20. Marnie Hudson
21. Jayde Taylor
22. Kate Jenner
23. Claire Messent
24. Fiona Boyce
25. Jade Warrender
26. Emily Smith
27. Rachael Lynch (GK)
29. Teneal Attard
30. Jordyn Holzberger
31. Jade Close
2014 National Squad

Head coach: Adam Commens
The 2014 national squad comprised the following 23 players:

2. Georgia Nanscawen
3. Brooke Peris
4. Casey Eastham
5. Ashlee Wells (GK)
6. Kirstin Johnson
7. Jodie Kenny
8. Ashleigh Nelson
9. Anna Flanagan
11. Karri McMahon
12. Madonna Blyth (C)
13. Edwina Bone
15. Kobie McGurk
16. Kellie White
18. Jane Claxton
19. Georgina Parker
21. Jayde Taylor
22. Kate Jenner
23. Claire Messent
26. Emily Smith
27. Rachael Lynch (GK)
28. Mathilda Carmichael
29. Teneal Attard
30. Jordyn Holzberger
2015 National Squad

Head coach: Adam Commens
The 2015 national squad comprised the following 23 players:

1. Gabrielle Nance
2. Georgia Nanscawen
3. Brooke Peris
4. Casey Sablowski
5. Ashlee Wells (GK)
6. Kirstin Dwyer
7. Jodie Kenny
8. Ashleigh Nelson
9. Anna Flanagan
11. Karri McMahon
12. Madonna Blyth (C)
13. Edwina Bone
15. Amelia Spence
16. Kellie White
17. Georgina Morgan
18. Jane Claxton
19. Georgina Parker
20. Kathryn Slattery
22. Kate Jenner
24. Mariah Williams
26. Emily Smith
27. Rachael Lynch (GK)
29. Teneal Attard
2016 National Squad

Head coach: Adam Commens
The 2016 national squad comprised the following 26 players:

1. Gabrielle Nance
2. Georgia Nanscawen
3. Brooke Peris
4. Casey Sablowski
5. Ashlee Wells (GK)
6. Kirstin Dwyer
7. Jodie Kenny
8. Ashleigh Nelson
9. Anna Flanagan
10. Madison Fitzpatrick
11. Karri McMahon
12. Madonna Blyth (C)
13. Edwina Bone
14. Stephanie Kershaw
16. Kellie White
17. Georgina Morgan
18. Jane Claxton
19. Georgina Parker
20. Kathryn Slattery
21. Renee Taylor
23. Kate Hanna
24. Mariah Williams
26. Emily Smith
27. Rachael Lynch (GK)
29. Teneal Attard
31. Laura Barden
2017 National Squad

Head coach: Paul Gaudoin
The 2017 national squad comprised the following 23 players:

1. Gabrielle Nance
2. Georgia Nanscawen
3. Brooke Peris
5. Ashlee Wells (GK)
6. Kirstin Dwyer
10. Madison Fitzpatrick
11. Karri McMahon
13. Edwina Bone
14. Stephanie Kershaw
15. Kaitlin Nobbs
16. Jordyn Holzberger
17. Georgina Morgan
18. Jane Claxton
19. Jocelyn Bartram (GK)
20. Kathryn Slattery
21. Renee Taylor
22. Madeleine Ratcliffe
23. Kate Hanna
24. Mariah Williams
26. Emily Smith (C)
27. Rachael Lynch (GK)
30. Grace Stewart
31. Laura Barden
2018 National Squad

Head coach: Paul Gaudoin
The 2018 national squad comprised the following 28 players:

1. Gabrielle Nance
2. Ambrosia Malone
3. Brooke Peris
4. Emily Hurtz
5. Ashlee Wells (GK)
7. Jodie Kenny
8. Georgia Wilson
9. Lily Brazel
10. Madison Fitzpatrick
11. Karri McMahon
13. Edwina Bone
14. Stephanie Kershaw
15. Kaitlin Nobbs
16. Jordyn Holzberger
17. Georgina Morgan
18. Jane Claxton
19. Jocelyn Bartram (GK)
20. Kathryn Slattery
21. Renee Taylor
22. Madeleine Ratcliffe
23. Kalindi Commerford
24. Mariah Williams
25. Ashlea Fey
26. Emily Smith (C)
27. Rachael Lynch (GK)
28. Kristina Bates
30. Grace Stewart
32. Savannah Fitzpatrick
2019 National Squad

Head coach: Paul Gaudoin
The 2019 national squad comprised the following 27 players:

1. Sophie Taylor
2. Ambrosia Malone
3. Brooke Peris
5. Ashlee Wells (GK)
6. Penny Squibb
7. Jodie Kenny (C)
8. Georgia Wilson
9. Lily Brazel
10. Madison Fitzpatrick
11. Karri McMahon
12. Greta Hayes
13. Edwina Bone
14. Stephanie Kershaw
15. Kaitlin Nobbs
17. Georgina Morgan (C)
18. Jane Claxton
19. Jocelyn Bartram (GK)
21. Renee Taylor
23. Kalindi Commerford
24. Mariah Williams
26. Emily Chalker (C)
27. Rachael Lynch (GK)
28. Kristina Bates
29. Rebecca Greiner
30. Grace Stewart
31. Hayley Padget
32. Savannah Fitzpatrick
2020 National Squad

Head coach: Paul Gaudoin
The 2020 national squad comprised the following 27 players:

1. Sophie Taylor
2. Ambrosia Malone
3. Brooke Peris
4. Amy Lawton
5. Ashlee Wells (GK)
7. Jodie Kenny (C)
8. Georgia Wilson
9. Lily Brazel
10. Madison Fitzpatrick
11. Karri McMahon
12. Greta Hayes
13. Edwina Bone
14. Stephanie Kershaw
15. Kaitlin Nobbs
16. Gabrielle Nance
17. Georgina Morgan (C)
18. Jane Claxton
19. Jocelyn Bartram (GK)
20. Karri Somerville
21. Renee Taylor
22. Kate Jenner
23. Kalindi Commerford
24. Mariah Williams
26. Emily Chalker (C)
27. Rachael Lynch (GK)
30. Grace Stewart
31. Laura Barden

=== 2021–2030 ===
2021 National Squad

Head coach: Katrina Powell
The 2021 national squad comprised the following 27 players:

1. Sophie Taylor
2. Ambrosia Malone
3. Brooke Peris
4. Amy Lawton
5. Ashlee Wells (GK)
6. Penny Squibb
7. Aleisha Power (GK)
8. Georgia Wilson
10. Madison Fitzpatrick
11. Meg Pearce
12. Greta Hayes
13. Edwina Bone
14. Stephanie Kershaw
15. Kaitlin Nobbs
16. Courtney Schonell
18. Jane Claxton (C)
19. Jocelyn Bartram (GK)
20. Karri Somerville
21. Renee Taylor
22. Kate Jenner
23. Kalindi Commerford
24. Mariah Williams
25. Emily Chalker (C)
26. Rachael Lynch (GK)
27. Grace Stewart
30. Laura Barden
31. Savannah Fitzpatrick
2022 National Squad

Head coach: Katrina Powell
The 2022 national squad comprised the following 22 players:

1. Claire Colwill
2. Ambrosia Malone
3. Brooke Peris (C)
4. Amy Lawton
6. Penny Squibb
7. Aleisha Power (GK)
8. Georgia Wilson
9. Shanea Tonkin
10. Madison Fitzpatrick
11. Meg Pearce
12. Greta Hayes
13. Harriet Shand
14. Stephanie Kershaw
15. Kaitlin Nobbs (C)
16. Courtney Schonell
18. Jane Claxton (C)
19. Jocelyn Bartram (GK)
20. Karri Somerville
21. Renee Taylor
24. Mariah Williams
29. Rebecca Greiner
30. Grace Stewart (C)
2023 National Squad

Head coach: Katrina Powell
The 2023 national squad comprised the following 22 players:

1. Claire Colwill
2. Ambrosia Malone
3. Brooke Peris (C)
4. Amy Lawton
5. Grace Young
6. Penny Squibb
7. Aleisha Power (GK)
10. Madison Fitzpatrick
12. Greta Hayes
13. Harriet Shand
14. Stephanie Kershaw
15. Kaitlin Nobbs (C)
16. Courtney Schonell
18. Jane Claxton (C)
19. Jocelyn Bartram (GK)
20. Karri Somerville
21. Renee Taylor
22. Tatum Stewart
24. Mariah Williams
28. Hannah Cullum-Sanders
29. Rebecca Greiner
30. Grace Stewart (C)
2024 National Squad

Head coach: Katrina Powell
The 2024 national squad comprised the following 22 players:

1. Claire Colwill
2. Ambrosia Malone
3. Brooke Peris (C)
4. Amy Lawton
5. Grace Young
6. Penny Squibb
7. Aleisha Power (GK)
8. Maddison Brooks
11. Alice Arnott
12. Greta Hayes
13. Harriet Shand
14. Stephanie Kershaw
15. Kaitlin Nobbs (C)
17. Lucy Sharman
18. Jane Claxton (C)
19. Jocelyn Bartram (GK)
20. Karri Somerville
21. Renee Taylor
22. Tatum Stewart
24. Mariah Williams
29. Rebecca Greiner
30. Grace Stewart (C)
2025 National Squad

Head coach: Katrina Powell
The 2025 national squad comprised the following 24 players:

1. Claire Colwill
3. Morgan Mathison
4. Amy Lawton
5. Grace Young
6. Penny Squibb
7. Aleisha Power (GK)
8. Maddison Brooks
9. Maddison Smith
10. Abigail Wilson
11. Alice Arnott
12. Greta Hayes
13. Harriet Shand
15. Kaitlin Nobbs (C)
16. Courtney Schonell
17. Lucy Sharman
18. Alana Kavanagh
19. Jocelyn Bartram (GK)
20. Karri Somerville
21. Jade Smith
22. Tatum Stewart
24. Mariah Williams
25. Zoe Newman (GK)
26. Lexie Pickering
30. Grace Stewart (C)
2026 National Squad

Head coach: (South Africa) Rhett Halkett
The 2026 national squad comprised the following 24 players:

1. Claire Colwill
2. Casey Dolkens
3. Morgan Mathison
4. Amy Lawton
5. Grace Young
6. Sarah Byrnes
7. Aleisha Power (GK)
10. Abigail Wilson
11. Alice Arnott
12. Greta Hayes
13. Makayla Jones
14. Stephanie Kershaw
15. Kaitlin Nobbs (C)
17. Lucy Sharman
18. Alana Kavanagh
19. Jocelyn Bartram (GK)
20. Karri Somerville
21. Jade Smith
22. Tatum Stewart
23. Olivia Downes
24. Mariah Williams
25. Zoe Newman (GK)
30. Grace Stewart (C)
31. Neasa Flynn

== Player recognition ==
In 1998, the FIH introduced the Player of the Year Awards, recognising those deemed to be the best in the world. The following table includes Australian players who have won an award or received nominations.

Player of the Year	Young Player of the Year	Goalkeeper of the Year
Alyson Annan (**1998, 2000**)	Angela Skirving (**2001**)	Rachael Lynch (2014, 2018, **2019**)
Katie Allen (2005)	Madonna Blyth (2006)	Rachael Lynch (2014, 2018, **2019**)
Julie Towers (2005)	Casey Eastham (**2009**)	Rachael Lynch (2014, 2018, **2019**)
Peta Gallagher (2007)	Anna Flanagan (**2012**, 2014)	Rachael Lynch (2014, 2018, **2019**)
Madonna Blyth (2009, 2013)	Kathryn Slattery (2016)	Jocelyn Bartram (2022, 2023, 2026)
Jodie Kenny (2015)	Ambrosia Malone (2018)	Jocelyn Bartram (2022, 2023, 2026)
Ambrosia Malone (2023)	Amy Lawton (2022)	Jocelyn Bartram (2022, 2023, 2026)
–	Claire Colwill (2024, 2026)	Jocelyn Bartram (2022, 2023, 2026)

Note: some players received multiple nominations, therefore winning years have been bolded.

Winner of Award

== Results ==
- Australia women's national field hockey team results (2006–10)
- Australia women's national field hockey team results (2011–15)
- Australia women's national field hockey team results (2016–20)
- Australia women's national field hockey team results (2021–2025)
