= Hockey at the 2010 Commonwealth Games =

Field hockey at the 2010 Commonwealth Games
- Venue: Dhyan Chand National Stadium
- Location: Delhi, India
- Dates: 4 – 14 October 2010
- Competitors: 320 from 11 nations

Hockey at the 2010 Commonwealth Games was the fourth appearance of Hockey at the Commonwealth Games. The field hockey events were held at the Dhyan Chand National Stadium in Delhi, India, from 4 October to 14 October 2010.

== Men's tournament ==
=== Medalists ===
Event	Gold	Silver	Bronze
Men	Australia; Australia; Chris Ciriello; Des Abbott; Eddie Ockenden; Fergus Kavanagh; Glenn Turner; Jamie Dwyer; Jason Wilson; Joel Carroll; Liam De Young; Luke Doerner; Mark Knowles; Matthew Swann; Nathan Burgers; Robert Hammond; Simon Orchard; Trent Mitton; Head coach: Ric Charlesworth	India; India; Sandeep Singh; Bharat Chettri; Arjun Halappa; Prabhjot Singh; Sardara Singh; Gurwinder Singh Chandi; Deepak Thakur; Sarwanjit Singh; Gurbaj Singh; Tushar Khandker; Rajpal Singh; Shivendra Singh; Bharat Chikara; Dhananjay Mahadik; Vikram Pillay; Danish Mujtaba; Head coach: Jose Brasa	New Zealand; New Zealand; Phil Burrows; Simon Child; Dean Couzins; Steve Edwards; Nick Haig; Andrew Hayward; Blair Hilton; Hugo Inglis; Stephen Jenness; Shea McAleese; Arun Panchia; Kyle Pontifex; Bradley Shaw; Hayden Shaw; Blair Tarrant; Nick Wilson; Head coach: Shane McLeod

== Women's tournament ==
=== Medalists ===
Event	Gold	Silver	Bronze
Women	Australia; Australia; Alison Bruce; Ashleigh Nelson; Casey Eastham; Emily Hurtz; Fiona Boyce; Fiona Johnson; Jayde Taylor; Kate Jenner; Kate Hollywood; Kobie McGurk; Madonna Blyth; Megan Rivers; Nicole Arrold; Rachael Lynch; Shelly Liddelow; Toni Cronk; Head coach: Frank Murray	New Zealand; New Zealand; Kayla Sharland; Emily Naylor; Krystal Forgesson; Katie Glynn; Stacey Carr; Ella Gunson; Beth Jurgeleit; Clarissa Eshuis; Lucy Talbot; Samantha Harrison; Gemma Flynn; Anna Thorpe; Natasha Fitzsimons; Charlotte Harrison; Stacey Michelsen; Anita Punt; Head coach: Mark Hager	England; England; Ashleigh Ball; Charlotte Craddock; Crista Cullen; Alex Danson; Susie Gilbert; Hannah Macleod; Helen Richardson; Chloe Rogers; Natalie Seymour; Beth Storry; Georgie Twigg; Laura Unsworth; Kate Walsh; Sally Walton; Nicola White; Kerry Williams; Head coach: Danny Kerry
