= Hockey at the 2010 Commonwealth Games – Men's team squads =

This article lists the squads of the men's hockey competition at the 2010 Commonwealth Games held in Delhi, India, from 4 to 14 October 2010.

== Australia ==
Head coach: Ric Charlesworth

- Des Abbott
- Nathan Burgers
- Joel Carroll
- Christopher Ciriello
- Liam De Young
- Luke Doerner
- Jamie Dwyer
- Robert Hammond
- Fergus Kavanagh
- Mark Knowles
- Trent Mitton
- Eddie Ockenden
- Simon Orchard
- Matthew Swann
- Glenn Turner
- Jason Wilson

== Canada ==
Head coach: Robin D'Abreo

- David Carter (gk)
- Adam Froese
- Matthew Guest
- Richard Hildreth
- David Jameson
- Antoni Kindler
- Mark Pearson
- Keegan Pereira
- Ken Pereira
- Rob Short
- Iain Smythe
- Hudson Stewart
- Gabbar Singh
- Scott Tupper
- Jesse Watson
- Philip Wright

== England ==
Head coach: Jason Lee

- Richard Alexander
- Alastair Brogdon
- Nick Catlin
- James Fair
- Adam Dixon
- Glenn Kirkham
- Ashley Jackson
- Iain Mackay
- Richard Mantell
- Simon Mantell
- Harry Martin
- Barry Middleton
- Robert Moore
- Richard Smith
- James Tindall
- Alastair Wilson

== India ==
Head coach: José Brasa

- Bharat Chettri (gk)
- Bharat Chikara
- Arjun Halappa
- Tushar Khandker
- Dhananjay Mahadik
- Danish Mujtaba
- Ravinder Pal Singh
- Vikram Pillay
- Dharamvir Singh
- Gurbaj Singh
- Rajpal Singh (capt)
- Sandeep Singh
- Sardar Singh
- Sarvanjit Singh
- Shivendra Singh
- Prabodh Tirkey

== Malaysia ==
Head coach: Stephen van Huizen

- Jamaluddin Roslan (gk)
- Baljit Singh
- Hafifihafiz Hanafi
- Izwan Firdaus Ahmad Tajuddin
- Muhamad Amin Rahim
- Marhan Jalil
- Faizal Saari
- Jiwa Mohan
- Mohd Madzli Mohd Nor (Capt)
- Tengku Ahmad Tajuddin
- Nabil Fiqri
- Sukri Mutalib
- Razie Rahim
- Azlan Misron
- Shahrun Nabil
- Kumar Subramaniam (gk)

== New Zealand ==
Head coach: Shane McLeod

- Phil Burrows
- Simon Child
- Dean Couzins
- Steve Edwards
- Nick Haig
- Andrew Hayward
- Blair Hilton
- Hugo Inglis
- Stephen Jenness
- Shea McAleese
- Arun Panchia
- Kyle Pontifex
- Bradley Shaw
- Hayden Shaw
- Blair Tarrant
- Nick Wilson

== Pakistan ==
Head coach: Michel van den Heuvel

- Zeeshan Ashraf (capt)
- Mohammad Imran
- Mohammad Irfan
- Waseem Ahmed
- Mohammad Rashid
- Fareed Ahmad
- Shafqat Rasool
- Rehan Butt
- Shakeel Abbasi
- Abdul Haseem Khan
- Muhammad Waqas Sharif
- Mohammad Rizwan
- Mohammad Umar Bhutta
- Imran Shah (gk)
- Muhammad Tauseeq
- Muhammad Kashif Javed

== Scotland ==
Head coach: Russell Garcia

- Kenny Bain
- Stephen Dick
- Alan Forsyth
- Cameron Fraser
- Gareth Hall
- William Marshall
- Vishal Marwaha
- Alistair McGregor
- Gordon McIntyre
- Graham Moodie
- Chris Nelson
- Mark Ralph
- Derek Salmond
- Iain Scholefield
- Niall Stott
- Ross Stott

== South Africa ==
Head coach: Gregg Clark

- Brendan Botes
- Gareth Carr
- Tim Drummond
- Ian Haley
- Rhett Halkett
- Thomas Hammond
- Marvin Harper
- Julian Hykes
- Lance Louw
- Lloyd Madsen
- Lloyd Norris-Jones
- Wade Paton
- Taine Paton
- Rassie Pieterse
- Justin Reid-Ross
- Austin Smith

== Trinidad & Tobago ==
Head coach: Eric Verboom

- Stephen Carlos
- Justin Pacal
- Christopher Scipio
- Aiden De Gannes
- Solomon Eccles
- Kwandwane Browne (c)
- Akim Toussaint
- Wayne Legerton
- Dillet Gilkes
- Dwain Quan Chan
- Cowie
- Matthew Tang Nian
- Marcus James
- Mickel Pierre
- Javon Woodward
- Alan Henderson

== See also ==
- Hockey at the 2010 Commonwealth Games – Women's team squads
