= Emma Meyer (disambiguation) =

Emma Meyer (1859–1921) was a Danish landscape painter.

Emma Meyer may also refer to:

- Emma Meyer (field hockey), member of the Australia women's national field hockey squad
- Emma Meyer, fictional character in List of The Boys characters and Gen V

== See also ==
- Emma Clara Schweer (1896–2001), née Meier, American tax collector
- Emma Myers, American actress
