= Murray Richards =

Australian field hockey player and coach

Murray ("Muz") John Richards (born 6 November 1976 in Brisbane, Queensland) is a former field hockey defender from Australia whose team won the gold medal at the 1997 Junior Hockey World Cup in Milton Keynes.

Richards made his senior debut for The Kookaburras in 1998. He played in total 28 matches for Australia, including the 2000 Champions Trophy in Amstelveen, and was a member of the Olympic Squad for the 2000 Summer Olympics in Sydney. After missing Olympic selection he traveled to Belgium to play for the Royal Antwerp Hockey Club (RAHC) - where he remains as a player / coach today.

Richards was recently named assistant coach to Adam Commens with the Belgium National Men's Hockey Team. The Belgium team made history by qualifying for the Beijing Olympic Games in 2008 by defeating world champions Germany at the 2007 European Nations Cup in Manchester, in the bronze medal match. It was Belgium's highest ever finish in a European Cup, and their first Olympic qualification since 1976.
