= Azelia Liu =

Canadian field hockey player

Azelia Liu (born March 15, 1979, in Scarborough, Ontario) is a field hockey goalkeeper from Canada. She played for the country's national junior team before joining the senior team in 2002. In her career, Liu has participated in numerous international tournaments, including the 2006 and 2010 Commonwealth Games, 2003 and 2007 Pan American Games, and 2004 and 2009 Pan American Cup.
