= Adam Commens =

Australian field hockey player

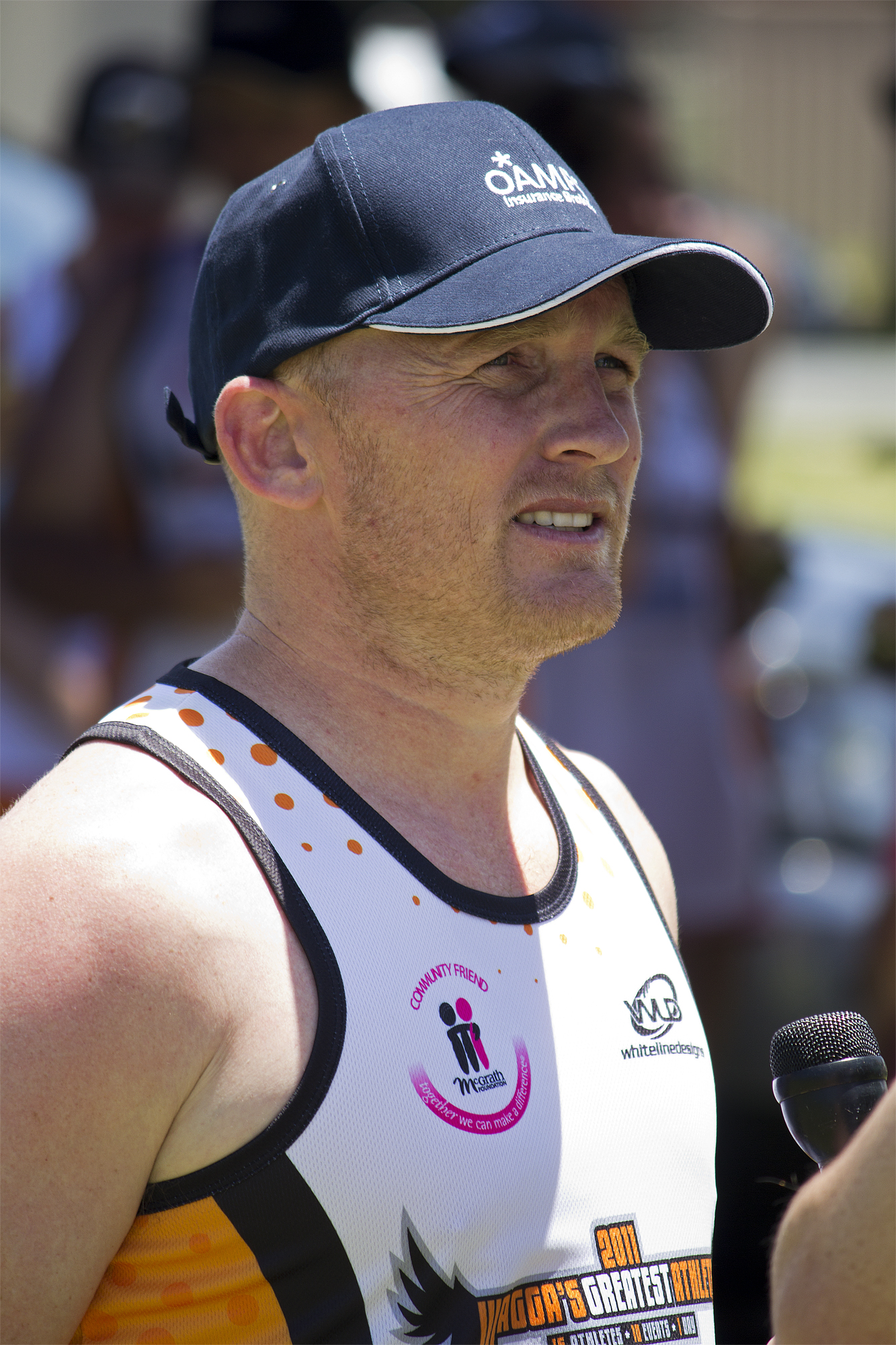
- Commens being interviewed at the 2011 Wagga's Greatest Athlete.

Medal record

Men's field hockey

Representing Australia

Olympic Games
Bronze medal – third place	2000 Sydney	Team

World Cup
Silver medal – second place	2002 Kuala Lumpur	Team

Champions Trophy
Gold medal – first place	1999 Brisbane	Team
Silver medal – second place	2001 Rotterdam	Team
Silver medal – second place	2003 Amstelveen	Team
Bronze medal – third place	1998 Lahore	Team

Commonwealth Games
Gold medal – first place	1998 Kuala Lumpur	Team

Adam David Commens (born 6 May 1976) is an Australian field hockey coach and former player. He was born in Wagga Wagga, New South Wales.

Commens was nicknamed Billy by his teammates, and earned 143 caps (20 goals) for Australia. He was a member of the team that won the bronze medal at the 2000 Summer Olympics in Sydney.

Commens was named head coach of the Belgium national field hockey team on 4 July 2007. He was coach and a key player of the Royal Antwerp Hockey Club (RAHC). His assistant was Murray Richards.

Commens became coach of the Australia women's team at the start of 2011. When he took over as coach, he dropped five experienced players from the national squad: Kate Hollywood, Fiona Johnson, Alison Bruce, Shelly Liddelow and Amy Korner.

Commens was stood down as coach after allegedly exposing himself to players at the 2016 Olympics. It is alleged he exposed himself and made lewd remarks to a group of Hockeyroos during celebrations after attending the hockey finals at the Olympics.

Since the Rio Olympic Games, Commens has been appointed as the High Performance Director of the Belgian Hockey Federation and won Belgium's first ever World Cup in 2018.
