= Bianca Russell =

New Zealand field hockey player

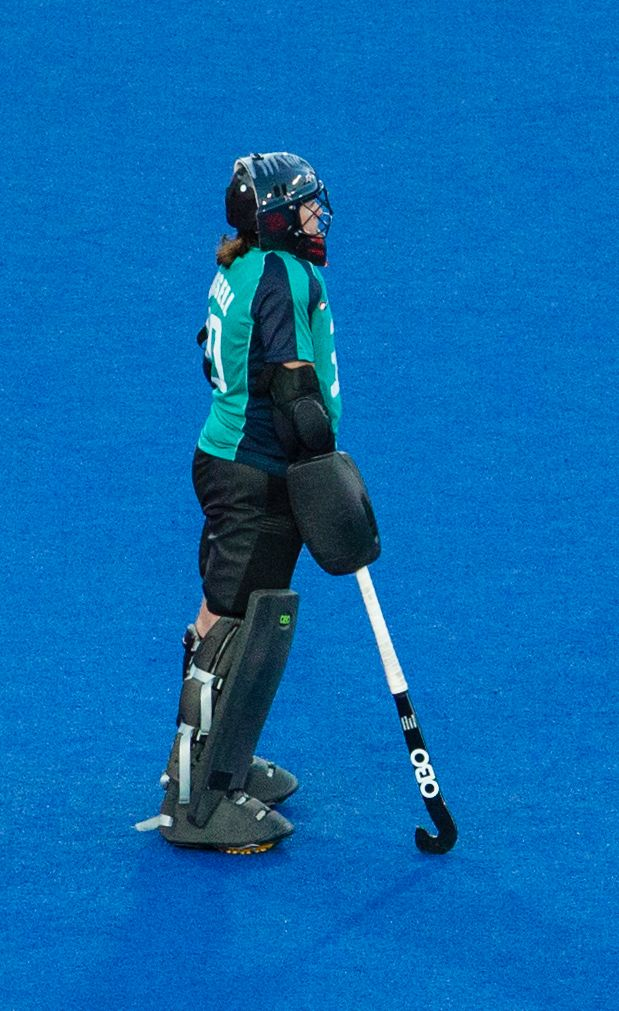
- Russell at the 2012 Summer Olympics

Personal information
- Born: 4 July 1978 (age 48) Takapuna, Auckland, New Zealand
- Height: 1.73 m (5 ft 8 in)

Sport
- Sport: Field hockey
- Position: Goalkeeper
Senior career
Years	Team	Caps	Goals
?–present	North Harbour	-	-
National team
Years	Team	Caps	Goals
2008–present	New Zealand	70	(0)
Medal record
Women's field hockey
Representing New Zealand
Champions Trophy
Bronze medal – third place	2011 Amstelveen	Team
Champions Challenge
Gold medal – first place	2009 Cape Town	Team
- Updated on 24 April 2014 (national)

Bianca Russell (born 4 July 1978) is a New Zealand field hockey goalkeeper. At the 2012 Summer Olympics, she competed for the New Zealand women's national field hockey team in the women's event.
