= Vuyisanani Mangisa =

South African field hockey player

Personal information
- Born: 14 September 1987 (age 38) Johannesburg, South Africa
- Height: 162 cm (5 ft 4 in)
- Weight: 58 kg (128 lb)

Sport
- Sport: Field hockey
- Position: Goalkeeper
- Club: Tuks
National team
Years	Team	Caps	Goals
2007	South Africa indoor	6	-
2008–2015	South Africa	112	-

Vuyisanani Mangisa (born 14 August 1987) is a South African field hockey player who competed in the 2008 Summer Olympics, 2010 Commonwealth Games and the 2014 Women's Hockey World Cup.
