= Justine Sowry =

Australian field hockey player and coach

Personal information
- Born: 3 October 1970 (age 55) Whyalla, South Australia
- Education: University of South Australia
Medal record
Women's field hockey
Representing Australia
Gold medal – first place	1994 Dublin	Team
Gold medal – first place	1998 Utrecht	Team

Justine Sowry (born 3 October 1970 in Whyalla, South Australia) is an Australian former field hockey goalkeeper and current Head Coach of University of Louisville Women's Field Hockey, the Cardinals, which competes in the Atlantic Coast Conference (ACC) in the United States. She was a member of Australia women's national field hockey team from 1991 - 2001 which is best known as the Hockeyroos which won the World Cup in 1994 and 1998. She was capped 128 times during her international career. She was a member of the Hockeyroos Olympic Squad for the Atlanta (1996) and Sydney Olympics (2000).

== Coaching career ==
Sowry earned a bachelor's degree in Physical Education and Mathematics from the University of South Australia, the program influenced by esteemed coach and teacher educators Alan Launder and Wendy Piltz. Sowry began her US coaching career at the University of Louisville, where she spent five years (1998-2002) as an assistant coach to Pam Bustin. Sowry served as a USA High Performance Coach with the U.S. Field Hockey Association (USFHA) from 2003 to 2007 and was the director of all goalkeeping programs. Sowry spent a year as an assistant coach for the Stanford University field hockey program in 2003, and went on to become assistant coach of the United States Junior National Team in 2005 and the Senior National team in 2006.

In 2007 Sowry was appointed Head Coach of UMass field hockey and led the program to national prominence over four seasons in the role. Sowry had a 58-31 (.652) overall record in those four seasons, including a 22-4 (.846) mark in Atlantic 10 play, and was named A-10 Coach of the Year three of those four seasons (2007, 2008, 2010), and Dita/NFHCA Northeast Region Coach of the Year twice (2008, 2010).

In 2011 Sowry returned to the University of Louisville Cardinals' now as Head Coach and is currently in her third season at the helm of the women's field hockey team. In 2012 Cardinals posted a 12-8 overall record and made their eighth straight appearance in the BIG EAST semifinals. Three players earned all-conference honours while Amber Thomas was selected to the NFHCA All-Region team.

Louisville has made it to the NCAA Tournament eight times in Sowry's tenure, advancing as far as the national semifinals in 2020.

== Coaching achievements ==
- 2011 Dita/NFHCA Division I Northeast Region Coach of the Year
- 2011 Atlantic 10 Coach of the Year
- 2010 Dita/NFHCA Northeast Region Coach of the Year
- 2010 Atlantic 10 Coach of the Year
- 2008 Dita/NFHCA Northeast Region Coach of the Year
- 2008 Atlantic 10 Coach of the Year
- 2007 WomensFieldHockey.com Coach of the Year
- 2007 Atlantic 10 Coach of the Year
