= Dipika Murthy =

Indian field hockey player (born 1980)

Personal information
- Full name: Dipika Gongala Murty
- Born: 10 August 1980 (age 46) Maharashtra, India

Sport
- Sport: Field hockey
- Position: Goalkeeper
- Club: western railway
National team
Years	Team	Caps	Goals
–	India		-
Medal record
Women's field hockey
Representing India
Asian Games
Bronze medal – third place	2006 Doha	Team
Asia Cup
Gold medal – first place	2004 New Delhi
Silver medal – second place	2009 Bangkok
Afro-Asian Games
Gold medal – first place	2003 Hyderabad

Dipika Gongala Murty (born 10 August 1980) is an Indian former field hockey player, who represented the India women's national field hockey team. She played with the team when it won the Gold at the 2004 Hockey Asia Cup and won a silver in the 2009 Asia cup at bangkok. She has represented India at the under-21 world cup in Argentina 2001 and in two senior world cups in Spain 2006 and Argentina in 2010. Her career includes Commonwealth Games Delhi 2010 and the Asian Games china 2010.
