= Dhananjay Mahadik (field hockey) =

Indian field hockey player

Personal information
- Born: 5 November 1984 (age 41) Mumbai, Maharashtra, India

Sport
- Sport: Field hockey
- Position: Defender
National team
Years	Team	Caps	Goals
–	India		-
Medal record
Men's field hockey
Representing India
Commonwealth Games
Silver medal – second place	2010 Delhi	Team
Asian Games
Bronze medal – third place	2010 Guangzhou	Team
- Updated on 25 July 2016

Dhananjay Mahadik (born 5 November 1984) is a former Indian field hockey player who played as a defender for the national team. He was part of the team that won the bronze medal at the 2010 Asian Games and silver medal at the 2010 Commonwealth Games. Currently he is working in Department of Sales Tax, Government of Maharashtra as Assistant Commissioner of sales tax.

In 2013, Hockey India appointed Mahadik as the video analyst of the men's senior team.
