= Bharat Chhikara =

Indian field hockey player (born 1985)

Personal information
- Born: 10 October 1985 (age 40) Kanonda (Bahadurgarh), Haryana, India

Sport
- Sport: Field hockey
- Position: Midfielder
National team
Years	Team	Caps	Goals
–	India		-
Medal record
Men's field hockey
Representing India
Commonwealth Games
Silver medal – second place	2010 Delhi	Team
Asian Games
Bronze medal – third place	2010 Guangzhou	Team
- Updated on 25 July 2016

Bharat Chhikara sometimes Chikara (born 10 October 1985) is an Indian field hockey player who has played as a midfielder for the national team. He was part of the team that won the bronze medal at the 2010 Asian Games and silver medal at the 2010 Commonwealth Games. Chhikara is an alumnus of Jamia Millia Islamia University.

Chhikara played in 2019 for the institutional side Indian Oil Corporation (IOC).
