= Ashlee Wells =

Australian field hockey player

Personal information
- Born: 1 August 1989 (age 37) Moe, Victoria
- Height: 1.80 m (5 ft 11 in)
- Weight: 71 kg (157 lb)

Sport
- Sport: Field hockey
- Position: Goalkeeper
- Club: SA Suns
National team
Years	Team	Caps	Goals
2011–2022	Australia	123	(0)
Medal record
Women's field hockey
Representing Australia
World Cup
Silver medal – second place	2014 Mendoza
Oceania Cup
Silver medal – second place	2019 Rockhampton
World League
Silver medal – second place	2012–13 Tucumán	Team
Champions Trophy
Silver medal – second place	2014 Mendoza
Silver medal – second place	2018 Changzhou

Ashlee Wells (born 1 August 1989) is a retired Australian field hockey player who plays as a goalkeeper. Wells was a member of the Australia women's national field hockey team that were defeated by the Netherlands women's national field hockey team in the final of the 2014 Women's Hockey World Cup. She debuted for Australia in October, 2011 and announced her retirement in January 2022. Her former club is Churchill HC, Latrobe, Victoria. Wells’ mother influenced her to pick up a hockey stick at age five. After working for Hockey Victoria, Wells decided to join the national squad in Perth in 2011. Some recent competitions Wells participated in include the 2015 World League, 2014 Champions Trophy, 2014 World Cup, 2013 World League and the 2013 Oceania Cup. She was also the reserve Goalkeeper for the London 2012 Olympics, while her first major international tournament was the Junior World Cup in 2009.
