= Giles Bonnet =

South African field hockey coach

Personal information
- Born: 10 February 1965 (age 61)

Sport
- Sport: Field hockey
Coaching career
- Years: Team
- 2002: Belgium
- 2012–2014: South Africa
- 2018–2019: Canada
- 2022–: South Africa

Giles Bonnet (born 10 February 1965) is a South African field hockey coach. At the 2012 Summer Olympics and the 2024 Summer Olympics he coached the South Africa women's national field hockey team.
