= Teneal Attard =

Australian field hockey player

Medal record

Women's field hockey

Representing Australia

Champions Trophy
Silver medal – second place	2014 Mendoza	Team

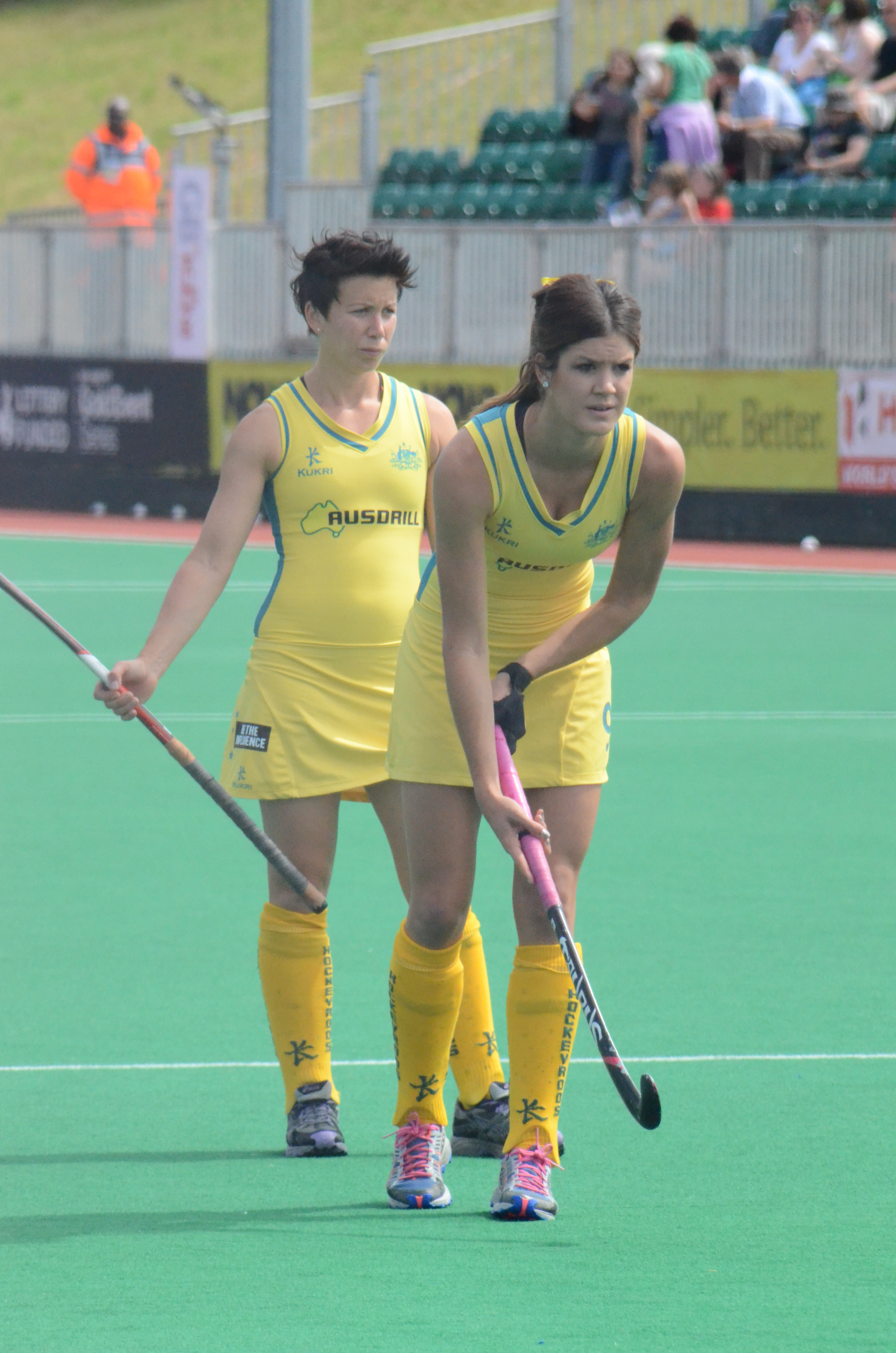
Teneal Attard (left) with Anna Flanagan

Teneal Attard (born 16 March 1985) is an Australian field hockey player from Mackay, Queensland. Attard competed in the 2008 Summer Olympics and 2012 Summer Olympics. She also plays for the Queensland Scorchers in the Australian Hockey League.
