= Rachael Lynch =

Australian field hockey player

Rachael Lynch OAM OLY
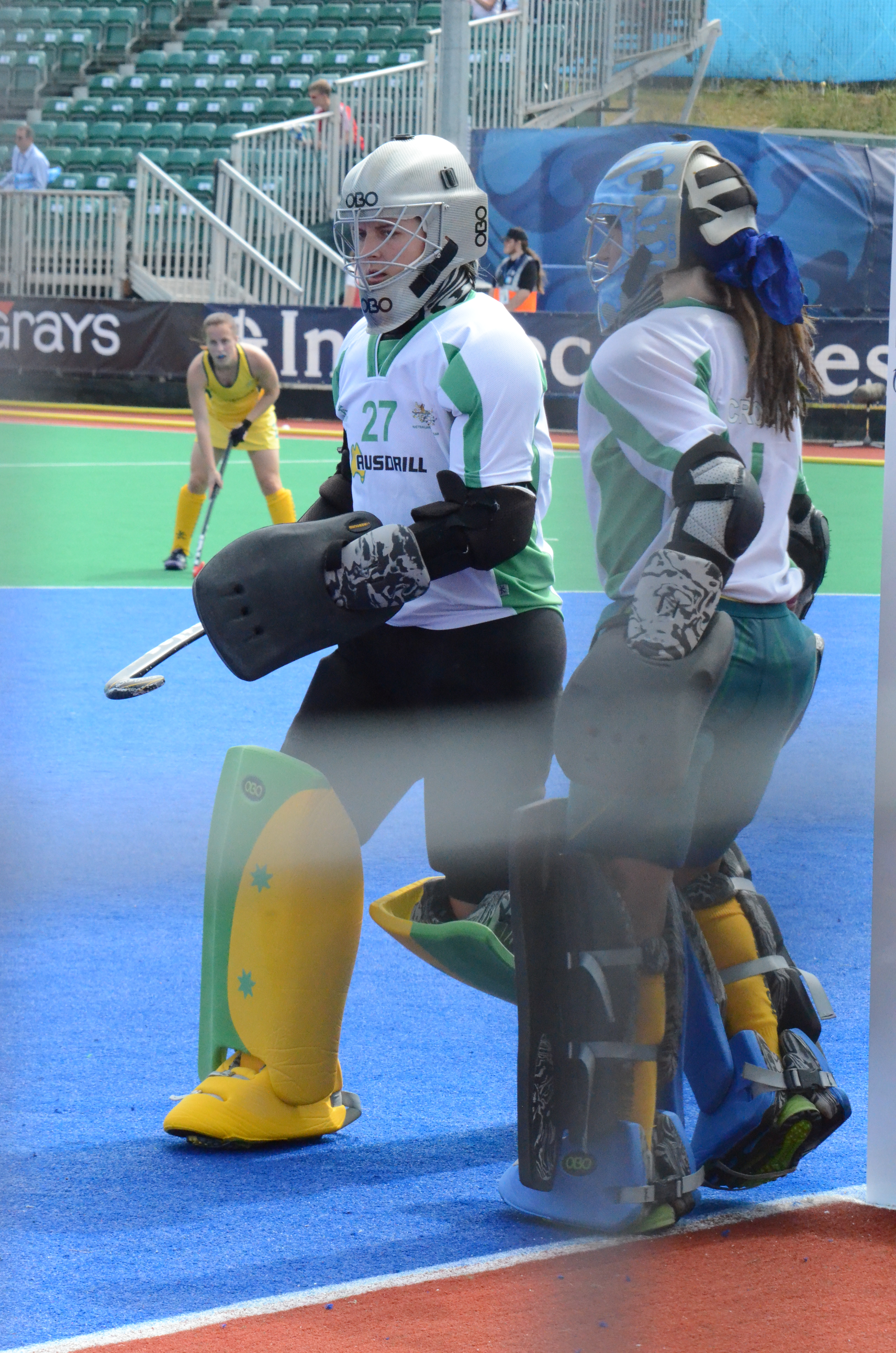
- Lynch (left) with Toni Cronk

Personal information
- Born: 2 July 1986 (age 40) Warrandyte, Victoria, Australia
- Height: 1.78 m (5 ft 10 in)
- Weight: 68 kg (150 lb)

Sport
- Sport: Field hockey
- Position: Goalkeeper
- Club: Camberwell Hockey Club
National team
Years	Team	Caps	Goals
2006–	Australia	222	(0)
Medal record
Women's field hockey
Representing Australia
FIH World Cup
Silver medal – second place	2014 The Hague	Team
Commonwealth Games
Gold medal – first place	2010 New Delhi	Team
Gold medal – first place	2014 Glasgow	Team
FIH Pro League
Silver medal – second place	2019 Amsterdam	Team
FIH World League
Silver medal – second place	2012–13 Tucumán	Team
Champions Trophy
Silver medal – second place	2009 Sydney	Team
Silver medal – second place	2018 Changzhou	Team
Oceania Cup
Gold medal – first place	2013 Stratford
Gold medal – first place	2015 Stratford
Gold medal – first place	2017 Sydney
Silver medal – second place	2011 Hobart
Silver medal – second place	2019 Rockhampton

Rachael Anne Lynch (born 2 July 1986) is a field hockey player from Australia.

== Personal life ==
Rachael Lynch was born and raised in Warrandyte, a suburb of Melbourne.

She worked as a nurse in neuro-rehabilitation at the Fiona Stanley Hospital in Perth, and previously worked at the Royal Perth Hospital.

== Career ==
=== Domestic leagues ===
==== Australian Hockey League ====
Prior to the disbandment of the Australian Hockey League (AHL), Lynch was a member of the Victorian Vipers. Throughout her career with the team, she won the national title on two occasions, in 2012 and 2017.

==== Hockey One ====
After the introduction of the Hockey One League in 2019, Lynch was named a member of the HC Melbourne team in the inaugural tournament. The team finished second, losing the final in penalties.

=== Hockeyroos ===
Lynch made her senior international debut for the Hockeyroos in 2006, in a test match against England. She won a silver medal with the team in 2009 at the Champions Trophy in Sydney.

Lynch has medalled three times at the Commonwealth Games, winning gold in 2010 and 2014, as well as silver in 2018. She also medalled at five consecutive Oceania Cups, winning three golds and two silvers from 2011 to 2019.

Lynch appeared in the 2016 Summer Olympics in Rio de Janeiro.

During the first season of the FIH Pro League, Lynch reached a career milestone, becoming the most capped goalkeeper to play for the Australian national team, a record previously set at 207 caps by Rachel Imison.

In December 2020, the Hockeyroos selection panel dropped Lynch from the national squad for 2021, essentially ending her career twelve months after she won the FIH Goalkeeper of the Year award. The removing of Lynch and former captain Georgina Morgan prompted an emergency meeting of the Hockeyroos, with the team considering a players' strike. In April 2021, Lynch won her appeal and returned to the Hockeyroos.

In June 2021, Lynch was selected as the keeper to represent Australia in the Tokyo 2020 Olympics. The Hockeyroos lost 1-0 to India in the quarter-finals and therefore were not in medal contention.

== Recognition ==
Since the introduction of the Goalkeeping Award in the FIH Player of the Year Awards in 2014, Lynch has been nominated on three occasions.

In 2019, Lynch won the award for the first time.

Lynch was awarded the Medal of the Order of Australia (OAM) at the 2024 Australia Day Honours for service to hockey.
