= Rachel Imison =

Australian field hockey player

Medal record

Women's field hockey

Representing Australia

Olympic Games
Gold medal – first place	2000 Sydney	Team

Commonwealth Games
Bronze medal – third place	2002 Manchester	Team
Gold medal – first place	2006 Melbourne	Team

Rachel Anne Imison OAM (born 16 December 1978) is an Australian field hockey player. She was born in Palmerston North, New Zealand. She won a gold medal at the 2000 Summer Olympics in Sydney.
