= Lucy Talbot =

New Zealand field hockey player (born 1989)

Personal information
- Born: 26 April 1989 (age 37) Auckland, New Zealand

Sport
- Sport: Field hockey
- Position: Defence
Senior career
Years	Team	Caps	Goals
?–present	Auckland Fury	-	-
National team
Years	Team	Caps	Goals
2009–present	New Zealand	65	(1)
Medal record
Women's field hockey
Representing New Zealand
Commonwealth Games
Silver medal – second place	2010 Delhi	Team competition
Champions Trophy
Bronze medal – third place	2011 Amstelveen	Team competition
Champions Challenge
Gold medal – first place	2009 Cape Town	Team competition
- Updated on 16 August 2012 (national)

Lucy Talbot (born 26 April 1989) is a New Zealand field hockey player. She has competed for the New Zealand women's national field hockey team (the Black Sticks Women) since 2009, including for the team at the 2010 Commonwealth Games.

In May 2012, Talbot broke her left hand at a training session in Napier, which required surgery to repair, and subsequently missed out on selection for the 2012 Summer Olympics.

Talbot was born in Auckland, and attended St Cuthbert's College.
