= Ashleigh Ball (field hockey) =

British field hockey player

Personal information
- Full name: Ashleigh Julia Ball
- Born: 25 March 1986 (age 40) Brighton, East Sussex, England

Sport
- Sport: Field hockey
- Position: Midfield
Medal record
Women's field hockey
Representing Great Britain
Olympic Games
Bronze medal – third place	2012 London	Team competition
Representing England
European Championship
Gold medal – first place	2015 London	Team competition

Ashleigh Julia Ball (born 25 March 1986 in Brighton) is a British field hockey player. She is an Olympic bronze medallist and a member of both the Women's Great Britain and England hockey teams.

Born in Brighton, Ball went to school in Cheltenham and attended Leeds University where she studied medical science and nutrition, and made her international hockey debut in 2008. Since then, Ball has earned 48 caps for England and 30 caps for Great Britain. Ball was part of the women's England hockey team of 2010 that won the World Cup, Commonwealth Games, and Champions Trophy bronze medals. She won a bronze medal at the 2012 Summer Olympics, scoring two minutes before half-time in the 3–0 victory over Belgium during the qualifying stages of the games.

Ball has played club hockey for Slough, Bowdon Hightown, and Bradford. Ball is managed by The Hub Entertainment.
