= Charlotte Craddock =

British field hockey player

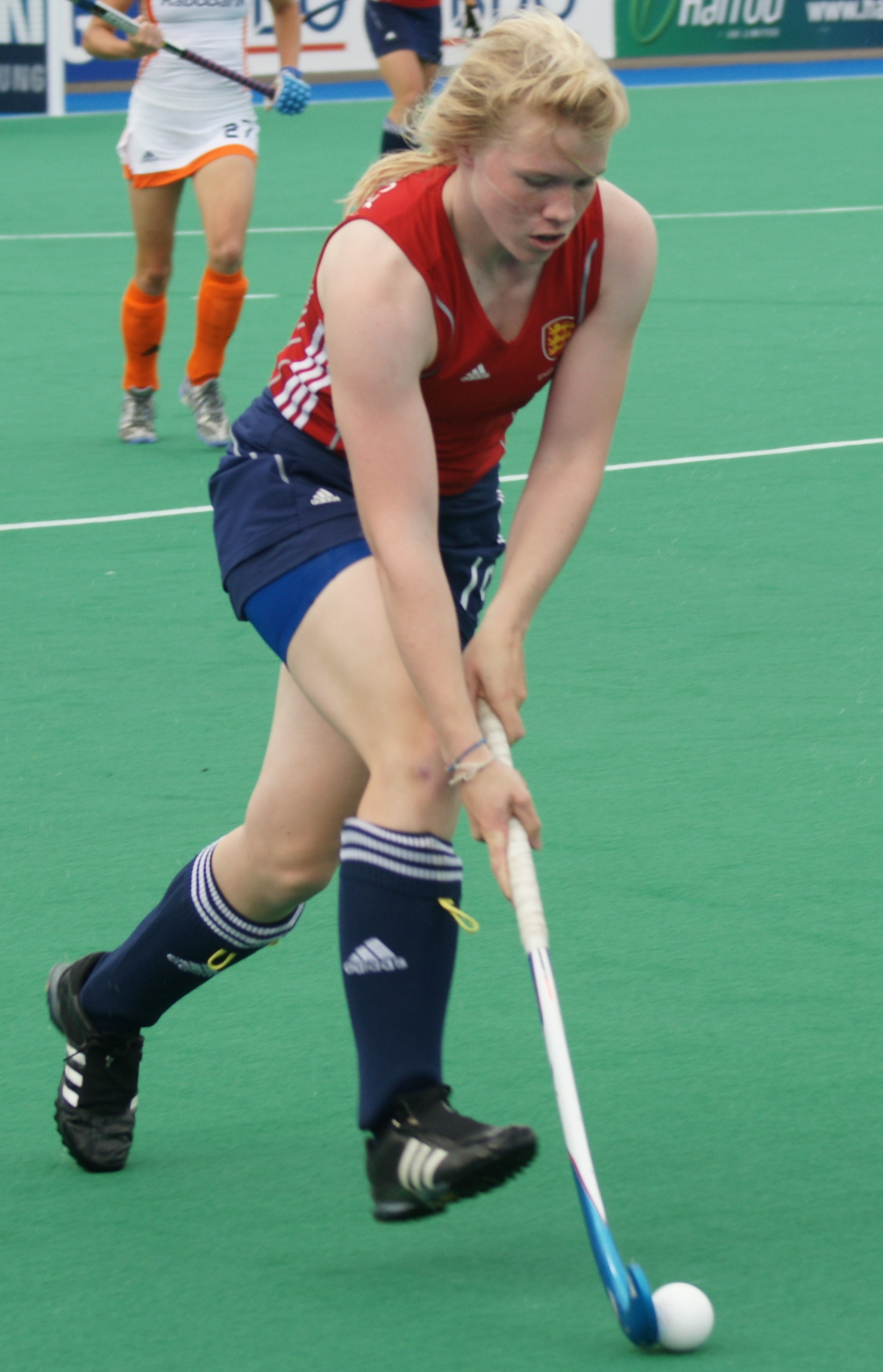

Personal information
- Full name: Charlotte Craddock
- Born: 24 October 1990 (age 35) Wolverhampton, West Midlands, England
- Height: 172 cm (5 ft 7 1/2 in)
- Weight: 72 kg (159 lb)

Sport
- Sport: Field hockey
Medal record
Women's field hockey
Representing England
2010 Commonwealth Games
Bronze medal – third place	2010 Delhi	Team
- Updated on 31 December 2021

Charlotte Helena Mary Craddock (born 24 October 1990 in Wolverhampton, West Midlands), is an English field hockey player who was the youngest member of the British hockey squad for the 2008 Summer Olympics in Beijing.

Charlotte made her international debut as a forward in November 2007 against Argentina. She was the youngest member of the Team GB hockey squad at the Beijing 2008 Summer Olympics. Charlotte represented England in the 2010 Commonwealth Games in Delhi, India, where the Women's team won the bronze medal.

== See also ==
- England at the 2010 Commonwealth Games
