= Kerry Williams (field hockey) =

English field hockey player

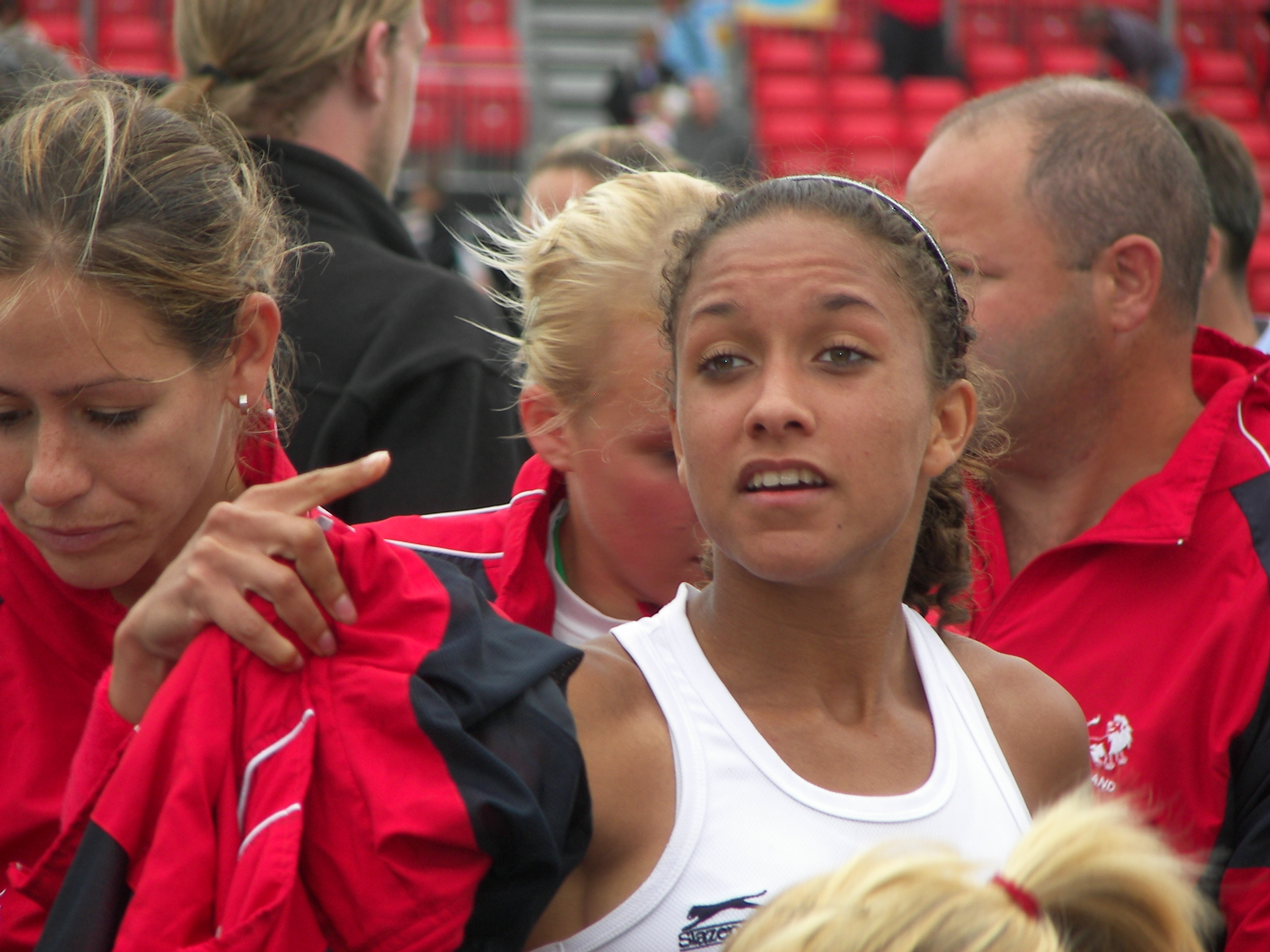
Kerry Williams

Kerry Williams (born 21 March 1986) is an English field hockey player.
