= Kobie McGurk =

Australian field hockey player

Personal information
- Nationality: Australian
- Born: 10 August 1985 (age 40)

Sport
- Sport: Field hockey
Medal record
Women's field hockey
Representing Australia
Commonwealth Games
Gold medal – first place	2006 Melbourne	Team

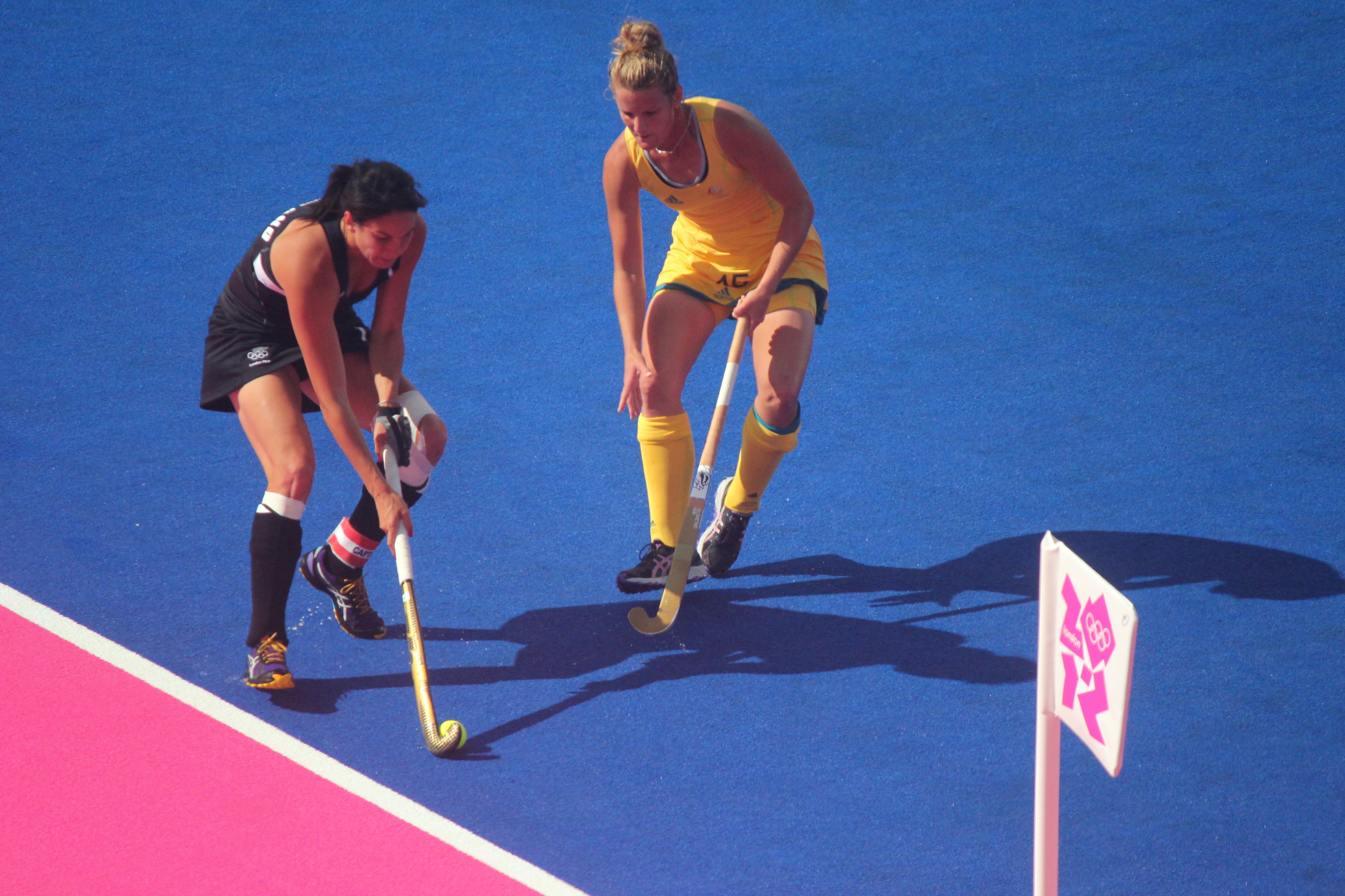
McGurk (right) at the 2012 Summer Olympics

Kobie McGurk (born 20 August 1985) is an Australian field hockey player who competed in the 2008 Summer Olympics and 2012 Summer Olympics.

McGurk is from Collie, Western Australia.
