= Natalie Seymour =

British triathlete and field hockey player

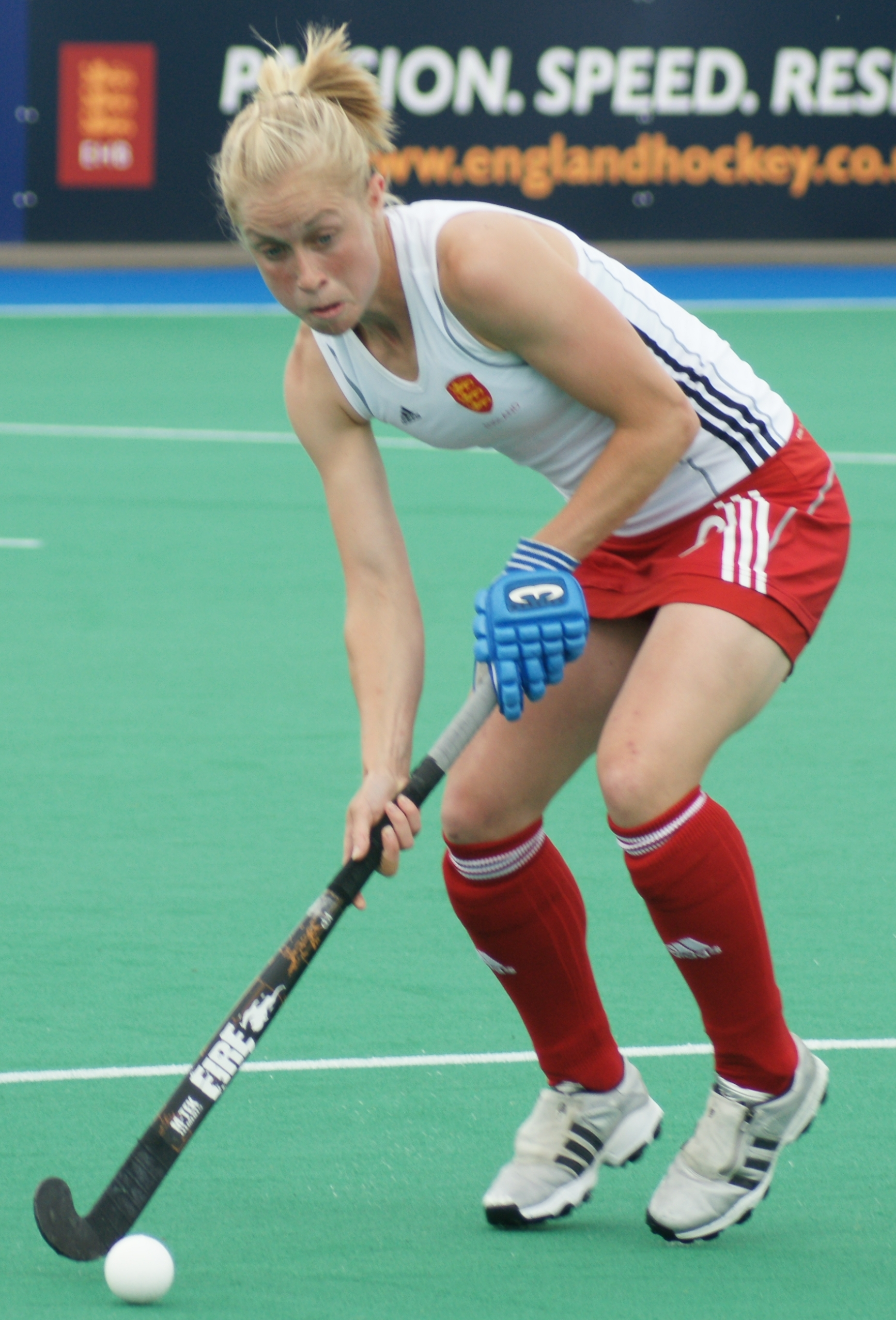

Personal information
- Born: 29 September 1986 (age 39)
- Height: 168 cm (5 ft 6 in)
- Weight: 56 kg (8 st 11 lb; 123 lb)

Sport
- Sport: Field hockey
- Position: Defence
Senior career
Years	Team	Caps	Goals
–	Canterbury	-	-
National team
Years	Team	Caps	Goals
2006 – 2014	Great Britain	74	-
Medal record
Representing England
Commonwealth Games
Bronze medal – third place	2010 Delhi	Team
- Updated on 18 October 2014

Natalie Seymour (born 29 September 1986) is a British triathlete and former field hockey player. She competed for England in the women's hockey tournament at the 2010 Commonwealth Games where she won a bronze medal.

Seymour was a reserve team member in the hockey tournament at the 2012 Summer Olympics. However, she was not chosen to play in any of the matches and so did not get to share in an eventual bronze medal with the rest of her teammates. Following on from this disappointment she decided to take an 18-month hiatus from the sport, and in 2014 she switched to competing in the triathlon.
