= Fiona Johnson =

Australian field hockey player

Personal information
- Born: 12 April 1983 (age 43)

Sport
- Sport: Field hockey
National team
Years	Team	Caps	Goals
–	Australia		-
Medal record
Women's field hockey
Representing Australia
Gold medal – first place	2010 Delhi	Team

Fiona Johnson (born 12 April 1983) is an Australian field hockey player.

Johnson was selected to represent Australia in the Beijing Olympic Games of 2008. She injured her left hamstring during a warm-up match versus China and therefore did not participate in the Games.

Johnson took part in the 2010 Commonwealth Games and was part of the team that won the gold medal.

She now takes part in ultramarathon competitions.
