= Kate Jenner =

Australian field hockey player

Medal record

Women's Field hockey

Representing Australia

World Cup
Silver medal – second place	2014 The Hague	Team

Commonwealth Games
Gold medal – first place	2010 Delhi	Team
Gold medal – first place	2014 Glasgow	Team

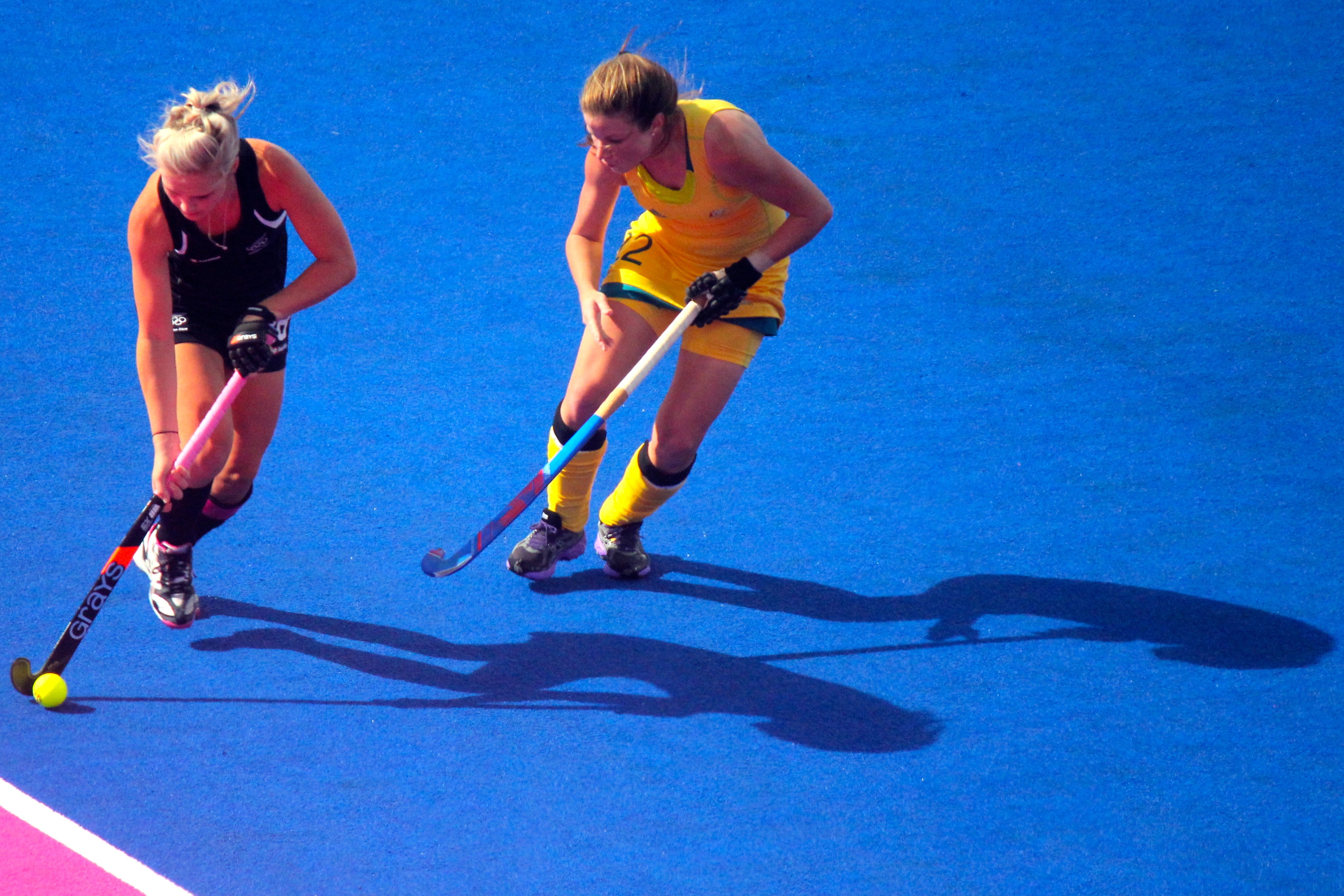
Kate Jenner (right) representing Australia against New Zealand at the 2012 Summer Olympics.

Kate Jenner (born May 5, 1990) is an Australian field hockey player. She represented Australia at the 2012 Summer Olympics. She was part of Australia's gold medal winning team at the 2014 Commonwealth Games, although she herself missed a penalty in the shootout that decided the gold medal match.

Jenner qualified for the Tokyo 2020 Olympics. She was part of the Hockeyroos Olympics squad. The Hockeyroos lost 1-0 to India in the quarterfinals and therefore were not in medal contention.
