= Alison Bruce (field hockey) =

Australian field hockey player

Alison Bruce (born 23 September 1987) is an Australian field hockey player.
