= Jayde Taylor =

Australian field hockey player

Medal record

Women's field hockey

Representing Australia

World Cup
Silver medal – second place	2014 The Hague	Team

Commonwealth Games
Gold medal – first place	2010 Delhi	Team
Gold medal – first place	2014 Glasgow	Team

Jayde Taylor (born 3 April 1985) is an Australian female field hockey player.
