= Toni Cronk =

Australian field hockey player

Personal information
- Born: 27 March 1980 (age 46)
Medal record
Women's field hockey
Representing Australia
Commonwealth Games
Gold medal – first place	2006 Melbourne	Team competition
Gold medal – first place	2010 Delhi	Team competition

Toni Maree Cronk (born 27 March 1980 in Bankstown, New South Wales) is a field hockey goalkeeper from Australia, who made her debut for the Australian women's national team in October 2001 in the test series against New Zealand in Melbourne. Nicknamed Cronky she was a member of the Hockeyroos at the 2004 Summer Olympics in Athens, Greece and the 2012 Summer Olympics in London, Great Britain. The team ended up in fifth place in the overall-rankings on both occasions.
