= Field hockey at the 2008 Summer Olympics – Women's team squads =

Twelve national teams competed in the women's field hockey tournament at the 2008 Summer Olympics in Beijing, China. Sixteen players were officially enrolled in each team. Two reserve players could also be nominated to be available should a player enrolled in the official team become injured during the tournament. Official team rosters were released by the FIH on 24 July 2008.

== Pool A ==
=== Australia ===
The following is the Australian roster in the women's field hockey tournament of the 2008 Summer Olympics.

Head Coach: Frank Murray

4. Casey Eastham
6. Megan Rivers
7. Kim Walker
10. Kate Hollywood
11. Emily Halliday
12. Madonna Blyth
14. Nicole Arrold
15. Kobie McGurk
16. Fiona Johnson
17. Rachel Imison (GK)
24. Angie Skirving
25. Melanie Twitt (c) (Note: Melanie Wells and Nikki Hudson were co-captains of the Australian team.)
28. Hope Munro
29. Teneal Attard
30. Sarah Taylor
32. Nikki Hudson (c)

Reserve:

1. Toni Cronk (GK)
13. Shelly Liddelow

=== China ===
The following is the Chinese roster in the women's field hockey tournament of the 2008 Summer Olympics.

Head Coach: Kim Chang-Back

1. Ma Yibo (c)
3. Chen Zhaoxia
5. Cheng Hui
7. Huang Junxia
8. Fu Baorong
9. Li Shuang
10. Gao Lihua
11. Tang Chunling
12. Zhou Wanfeng
16. Zhang Yimeng (GK)
17. Li Hongxia
18. Ren Ye
19. Chen Qiuqi
21. Zhao Yudiao
22. Song Qingling
31. Pan Fengzhen (GK)

Reserve:

13. Sun Zhen
23. Li Aili

=== Netherlands ===
The following is the Dutch roster in the women's field hockey tournament of the 2008 Summer Olympics.

Head Coach: Marc Lammers

1. Lisanne de Roever (GK)
3. Eefke Mulder
4. Fatima Moreira de Melo
7. Miek van Geenhuizen
9. Wieke Dijkstra
11. Maartje Goderie
12. Lidewij Welten
13. Minke Smabers
14. Minke Booij (c)
15. Janneke Schopman
17. Maartje Paumen
18. Naomi van As
19. Ellen Hoog
21. Sophie Polkamp
24. Eva de Goede
27. Marilyn Agliotti

Reserve:

10. Kelly Jonker
22. Floortje Engels (GK)

=== South Africa ===
The following is the South African roster in the women's field hockey tournament of the 2008 Summer Olympics.

Head Coach: Jennifer King

1. Mariette Rix (GK)
2. Vuyisanani Mangisa (GK)
3. Kate Hector
5. Taryn Hosking
7. Cindy Brown
8. Marsha Marescia (c)
10. Shelley Russell
13. Lisa-Marie Deetlefs
16. Jenny Wilson
17. Lesle-Ann George
18. Vida Ryan
19. Vidette Ryan
21. Lenise Marais
22. Kathleen Taylor
27. Fiona Butler
29. Tarryn Bright

Reserve:

20. Henriette du Buisson
23. Farrah Fredericks

=== South Korea ===
The following is the South Korean roster in the women's field hockey tournament of the 2008 Summer Olympics.

Head Coach: Han Jin-soo

1. Moon Young-hui (GK)
3. Cho Hye-sook
5. Kim Young-ran
7. Lee Seon-ok (c)
8. Kim Jung-hee
9. Park Mi-hyun
10. Kim Jin-kyoung
11. Kim Mi-seon
12. Kim Jong-eun
14. Eum Mi-young
15. Gim Sung-hee
17. Seo Hye-jin
18. Park Jeong-sook
19. Kim Eun-sil
22. Kim Da-rae
23. Han Hye-lyoung

Reserve:

2. Lim Seon-mee
16. Lee Soo-jin (GK)

=== Spain ===
The following is the Spanish roster in the women's field hockey tournament of the 2008 Summer Olympics.

Head Coach: Pablo Usoz

1. María Jesús Rosa (GK)
2. Julia Menéndez
3. Rocío Ybarra
7. Bárbara Malda
9. Silvia Muñoz (c)
10. Silvia Bonastre
11. María Romagosa
12. Marta Ejarque
13. Raquel Huertas
14. Pilar Sánchez
17. Núria Camón
19. María Lopéz (GK)
20. Montse Cruz
21. Esther Termens
22. Gloria Comerma
23. Georgina Olivia

Reserve:

5. Paula Dabanch
8. Panadero Yurena

== Pool B ==
=== Argentina ===
The following is the Argentine roster in the women's field hockey tournament of the 2008 Summer Olympics.

Head Coach: Gabriel Minadeo

1. Belén Succi (GK)
3. Magdalena Aicega (c)
4. Rosario Luchetti
7. Alejandra Gulla
8. Luciana Aymar
10. Agustina García
11. Carla Rebecchi
12. Mariana González Oliva
14. Mercedes Margalot
15. María de la Paz Hernández
16. Mariana Rossi
18. Paola Vukojicic (GK)
19. Mariné Russo
24. Claudia Burkart
26. Giselle Kañevsky
27. Noel Barrionuevo

Reserve:

9. Silvina D'Elía
25. Agustina Bouza

=== Germany ===
The following is the German roster in the women's field hockey tournament of the 2008 Summer Olympics.

Head Coach: Michael Behrmann

2. Tina Bachmann
4. Mandy Haase
7. Natascha Keller
9. Martina Heinlein
11. Eileen Hoffmann
13. Marion Rodewald (c)
14. Katharina Scholz
16. Fanny Rinne
18. Anke Kühn
22. Janine Beermann
24. Maike Stöckel
25. Janne Müller-Wieland
26. Christina Schütze
27. Pia Eidmann
28. Julia Müller
32. Kristina Reynolds (GK)

Reserve:

1. Yvonne Frank
29. Lina Geyer

=== Great Britain ===
The following is the British roster in the women's field hockey tournament of the 2008 Summer Olympics.

Head Coach: Danny Kerry

2. Beth Storry (GK)
3. Lisa Wooding
4. Anne Panter
5. Crista Cullen
6. Melanie Clewlow
7. Charlotte Craddock
8. Helen Richardson
9. Joanne Ellis
10. Lucilla Wright
11. Kate Walsh (c)
12. Chloe Rogers
13. Jennie Bimson
14. Rachel Walker
15. Alex Danson
18. Sarah Thomas
22. Jo Ellis

Reserve:

1. Katy Roberts (GK)
19. Laura Barlett

=== Japan ===
The following is the Japanese roster in the women's field hockey tournament of the 2008 Summer Olympics.

Head Coach: Yoo Seung-Jin

1. Ikuko Okamura (GK)
2. Keiko Miura
4. Mayumi Ono
5. Chie Kimura
6. Rika Komazawa
7. Miyuki Nakagawa
8. Sakae Morimoto
9. Kaori Chiba
10. Yukari Yamamoto
11. Toshie Tsukui
13. Sachimi Iwao
14. Akemi Kato (c)
15. Tomomi Komori
18. Misaki Ozawa
20. Chinami Kozakura
22. Yuka Yoshikawa (GK)

Reserve:

3. Hikari Suwa
19. Nichika Urata

=== New Zealand ===
The following is the New Zealand roster in the women's field hockey tournament of the 2008 Summer Olympics.

Head Coach: Kevin Towns

1. Kayla Sharland
2. Emily Naylor
3. Krystal Forgesson
4. Kate Saunders
8. Jaimee Claxton
10. Lizzy Igasan (c)
11. Stacey Carr
13. Jo Galletly
14. Kim Noakes
15. Beth Jurgeleit (GK)
17. Caryn Paewai
21. Niniwa Roberts
22. Gemma Flynn
23. Tara Drysdale
24. Sheree Horvath
26. Anita Wawatai (GK)

Reserve:

28. Charlotte Harrison
29. Jasmine McQuinn

=== United States ===
The following is the American roster in the women's field hockey tournament of the 2008 Summer Olympics.

Head Coach: Lee Bodimeade

3. Angela Loy
4. Kelly Doton
7. Jesse Gey
8. Rachel Dawson
10. Tiffany Snow
13. Keli Smith
15. Dana Sensenig
17. Carrie Lingo
19. Caroline Nichols
22. Kate Barber (c)
23. Katelyn Falgowski
24. Dina Rizzo
25. Amy Tran (GK)
26. Kayla Bashore
27. Lauren Crandall
28. Lauren Powley

Reserve:

11. Sara Silvetti
16. Barbara Weinberg (GK)
