= 2006 Women's Hockey World Cup squads =

This article lists the confirmed squads for the 2006 Women's Hockey World Cup tournament held in Madrid, Spain between September 27 and October 8, 2006.

== Pool A ==
=== China ===
Head Coach: Kim Chang-back

No.	Player	Pos.	Age
1	Nie Yali	GK	33
3	Chen Zhaoxia		31
4	Ma Yibo (c)		26
6	Mai Shaoyang		27
8	Fu Baorong		28
9	Li Shuang		28
10	Gao Lihua		26
11	Tang Chunling		30
12	Zhou Wanfeng		26

No.	Player	Pos.	Age
13	Sun Zhen		20
15	Sun Sinan		18
16	Zhang Yimeng	GK	22
17	Li Hongxia		20
18	Ren Ye		20
19	Chen Qiuqi		26
20	Cheng Jiayan		23
26	Xin Qian		20
28	Wang Yanhui		25

=== England ===
Head coach: Danny Kerry

No.	Player	Pos.	Age
1	Katy Roberts	GK	29
2	Beth Storry	GK	28
3	Lisa Wooding	DF	26
5	Crista Cullen	DF	21
6	Melanie Clewlow	DF	30
7	Helen Grant	FW	27
8	Helen Richardson	DF	25
9	Jo Ellis	FW	22
10	Lucilla Wright	MF	26

No.	Player	Pos.	Age
11	Kate Walsh (c)	DF	26
12	Chloe Rogers		21
13	Jennie Bimson	MF	29
14	Rachel Walker	MF	27
15	Alex Danson	FW	21
17	Rebecca Herbert	MF	20
18	Sally Walton	FW	22
21	Joanne Ellis	FW	25
23	Kerry Williams	FW	20

=== Germany ===
Head coach: Markus Weise

No.	Player	Pos.	Age
1	Yvonne Frank	GK	26
2	Tina Bachmann		24
4	Mandy Haase		24
5	Nadine Ernsting-Krienke		32
6	Svenja Schürmann		23
7	Natascha Keller		29
8	Kerstin Hoyer		25
9	Martina Heilein		25
10	Silke Müller		27

No.	Player	Pos.	Age
13	Marion Rodewald (c)		29
14	Katharina Scholz		23
16	Fanny Rinne		26
18	Anke Kühn		25
19	Britta von Livonius		30
21	Badri Latif		29
22	Janine Beermann		22
24	Maike Stöckel		22
32	Kristina Reynolds	GK	22

=== India ===
Head coach: Maharaj Krishan Kaushik

No.	Player	Pos.	Age
1	Helen Mary	GK	29
2	Dipika Murthy	GK	26
4	Rajwinder Kaur		22
5	Asunta Lakra		20
9	Surinder Kaur		24
10	Mamta Kharab		24
11	Deepika Thakur		19
14	Ritu Rani		14
15	Joydeep Kaur		17

No.	Player	Pos.	Age
18	Jasjeet Kaur Handa		18
19	Sanggai Chanu		25
20	Jyoti Sunita Kullu (c)		27
21	Gagandeep Kaur		20
23	Pushpa Pradhan		24
24	Saba Anjum Karim		21
25	Binita Toppo		26
30	Subhadra Pradhan		21
32	Suman Bala		24

=== Netherlands ===
Head coach: Marc Lammers

No.	Player	Pos.	Age
1	Lisanne de Roever	GK	27
3	Eefke Mulder	FW	28
4	Fatima Moreira de Melo	MF	28
5	Jiske Snoeks	MF	28
7	Miek van Geenhuizen	MF	24
9	Wieke Dijkstra	DF	22
10	Sylvia Karres	FW	29
11	Maartje Goderie	MF	22
13	Minke Smabers	MF	29

No.	Player	Pos.	Age
14	Minke Booij (c)	DF	29
15	Janneke Schopman	DF	29
16	Chantal de Bruijn	DF	30
17	Maartje Paumen	DF	21
18	Naomi van As	FW	23
19	Ellen Hoog	FW	20
20	Eveline de Haan	GK	30
21	Sophie Polkamp	DF	22
23	Kim Lammers	FW	25

=== Spain ===
Head coach: Pablo Usoz

No.	Player	Pos.	Age
1	María Jesús Rosa	GK	26
2	Julia Menéndez		21
3	Rocío Ybarra	DF	21
4	Gemma Bernad		20
7	Bárbara Malda		22
8	Marta Prat		25
9	Silvia Muñoz (c)	FW	27
10	Silvia Bonastre	MF	24
11	María Romagosa		21

No.	Player	Pos.	Age
12	Marta Ejarque		20
13	Raquel Huertas		24
14	Pilar Sánchez		24
17	Núria Camón	MF	28
19	María López	GK	22
20	Montse Cruz		26
21	Esther Termens	MF	21
22	Gloria Comerma		19
23	Georgina Oliva		16

== Pool B ==
=== Argentina ===
Head coach: Gabriel Minadeo

No.	Player	Pos.	Age
1	Mariela Antoniska	GK	31
3	Magdalena Aicega (c)	DF	32
4	Rosario Luchetti	MF	22
6	Ayelén Stepnik	MF	30
7	Alejandra Gulla	FW	29
8	Luciana Aymar	MF	29
9	Agustina Bouza	FW	22
10	Soledad García	FW	25
11	Carla Rebecchi	FW	22

No.	Player	Pos.	Age
12	Mariana González Oliva	MF	30
14	Mercedes Margalot	DF	31
15	María de la Paz Hernández	FW	29
17	Florencia D'Elía	MF	24
18	Paola Vukojicic	GK	32
19	Mariné Russo	MF	26
22	Gabriela Aguirre	FW	20
24	Claudia Burkart	DF	26
26	Giselle Kañevsky	MF	21

=== Australia ===
Head coach: Frank Murray

No.	Player	Pos.	Age
2	Suzie Faulkner	FW	27
3	Karen Smith	MF	27
7	Kim Walker	MF	30
9	Rebecca Sanders	DF	24
11	Emily Halliday	DF	27
12	Madonna Blyth	MF	20
13	Wendy Beattie	MF	26
14	Nicole Arrold	DF	24
15	Kobie McGurk	DF	21

No.	Player	Pos.	Age
17	Rachel Imison	GK	27
19	Donna-Lee Patrick	FW	24
21	Deanne Gilbert	GK	24
24	Angie Skirving	DF	25
25	Melanie Twitt	MF	28
28	Hope Munro	DF	25
29	Teneal Attard	DF	21
30	Sarah Taylor	MF	24
32	Nikki Hudson (c)	FW	30

=== Japan ===
Head coach: Yoo Seung-Jin

No.	Player	Pos.	Age
1	Rie Terazono	GK	25
2	Keiko Miura		31
3	Mayumi Ono		22
5	Chie Kimura		26
7	Rika Komozawa		24
8	Sakae Morimoto		29
9	Kaori Chiba		25
10	Tomomi Komori		23
11	Toshie Tsukui		31

No.	Player	Pos.	Age
12	Chie Akutsu		22
13	Sachimi Iwao		30
14	Akemi Kato (c)		35
15	Miyuki Nakagawa		19
16	Misaki Ozawa		21
17	Chinami Kozakura		18
18	Mika Iimura		20
19	Ikuko Okamura	GK	30
20	Yuko Kitano		24

=== Korea ===
Head coach: Huh Sang-youn

No.	Player	Pos.	Age
1	Lim Ju-yong (c)	GK	26
2	Lim Seon-mee		19
3	Lee Jin-hee		26
4	Park Young-soon		21
5	Choi Eun-young		20
6	Park Seon-mi		24
7	Oh Ko-woon		25
8	Kim Jung-hee		23
9	Park Mi-hyun		20

No.	Player	Pos.	Age
10	Kim Jin-kyoung		25
11	Lee Young-sil		19
12	Kim Jong-eun		20
13	Han Hye-lyoung		20
14	Han Tae-jeong		19
15	Kim Bo-mi		20
16	Jang Soo-ji	GK	18
17	Park Na-hyun		24
18	Park Jeong-sook		25

=== South Africa ===
Head coach: Jenny King

No.	Player	Pos.	Age
1	Caroline Jack	GK	28
2	Mariette Rix	GK	25
3	Kate Hector		24
5	Taryn Hosking		25
7	Cindy Brown		21
8	Marsha Marescia (c)		23
10	Shelley Russell		19
12	Dirkie Chamberlain		19
16	Jenny Wilson		27

No.	Player	Pos.	Age
17	Leslie-Ann George		20
20	Henna Du Buisson		24
21	Lenise Marais		21
22	Kathleen Taylor		21
24	Fiona Butler		28
26	Kim Hubach		22
28	Tsoanelo Pholo		23
29	Tarryn Bright		23
30	Sharne Wehmeyer		26

=== United States ===
Head coach: Lee Bodimeade

No.	Player	Pos.	Age
1	Kayla Bashore	DF	23
2	Melissa Leonetti	DF	24
3	Angie Loy	FW	24
4	Kelly Doton	FW	24
6	Kristi Gannon	DF	24
8	Rachel Dawson	MF	21
9	Sarah Dawson	FW	23
10	Tiffany Snow	FW	24
11	Sara Silvetti	DF	24

No.	Player	Pos.	Age
12	April Fronzoni	FW	24
13	Keli Smith	FW	27
14	Katelyn Falgowski	FW	17
16	Barbara Weinberg	GK	24
17	Carrie Lingo	MF	27
22	Kate Barber (c)	FW	29
24	Dina Rizzo	FW	26
25	Amy Tran	GK	25
28	Lauren Powley	MF	22
