= 2005 Women's Hockey Champions Challenge =

International field hockey tournament

Tournament details
- Host country: United States
- City: Virginia
- Dates: 8 July – 16 July
- Teams: 6
- Venue: USA Field Hockey National Training Center

Final positions
- Champions: New Zealand (1st title)
- Runner-up: South Africa
- Third place: Japan

Tournament statistics
- Matches played: 18
- Goals scored: 64 (3.56 per match)
- Top scorer(s): (Japan) Tomomi Komori (United States) Angela Loy (3 goals)
- Best player: (New Zealand) Elizabeth Igasan

The 2005 Women's Hockey Champions Challenge was the third edition of the field hockey championship for women. It was held in Virginia Beach, United States from July 8–16, 2005.

New Zealand participate in 2006 Champions Trophy in Amstelveen, Netherlands after defeated South Africa in the final.

== Squads ==
England

Head Coach: Danny Kerry

2. Beth Storry (GK)
3. Lisa Wooding
4. Rachel Walsh
6. Melanie Clewlow
7. Helen Grant
8. Helen Richardson
9. Leisa King
10. Lucilla Wright
11. Kate Walsh (c)
12. Frances Houslop
13. Jennie Bimson
14. Rachel Walker
17. Tina Cullen
18. Sally Walton
20. Joanne Ellis
21. Alex Scott
22. Cathy Gilliat-Smith
24. Becky Duggan (GK)
Japan

Head Coach: John Sheahan

1. Rie Terazono (GK)
2. Emi Sakurai
4. Erika Esaki
6. Yukari Yamamoto
7. Rika Komazawa
8. Sakae Morimoto
9. Kaori Chiba
10. Miyuki Nakagawa
11. Tomomi Komori
12. Toshie Tsukui
13. Hiromi Hashimoto
14. Akemi Kato (c)
15. Mayumi Ono
17. Chie Akutsu
18. Misaki Ozawa
19. Ikuko Okamura (GK)
23. Sachimi Iwao
27. Mie Nakashima
Spain

Head Coach: Pablo Usoz

1. María Jesús Rosa (GK)
2. Julia Menéndez
3. Rocío Ybarra
4. Ivet Muñoz
6. Lucía Antona
7. Bárbara Malda
8. Marta Prat
9. Silvia Muñoz (c)
10. Silvia Bonastre
11. Olalla Pineiro
12. Marta Ejarque
13. Raquel Huertas
14. Pilar Sánchez
15. Laía Yurss
17. Núria Camón
18. María Gomez
19. María López (GK)
21. Esther Termens
New Zealand

Head Coach: Ian Rutledge

1. Kayla Sharland
2. Emily Naylor
6. Meredith Orr
8. Jaimee Provan
9. Honor Dillon
10. Lizzy Igasan
11. Stacey Carr
12. Elizabeth Ryan
13. Jo Galletly
14. Suzie Muirhead (c)
15. Beth Jurgeleit (GK)
16. Clarissa Eshuis
19. Jane Maley
20. Frances Kreft
21. Niniwa Roberts
22. Rachel Robertson
24. Sheree Phillips
26. Anita Wawatai (GK)
South Africa

Head Coach: Jenny King

1. Caroline Jack (GK)
3. Kate Hector
4. Nita Van Jaarsveld
5. Taryn Hosking
8. Marsha Marescia
9. Candice Forword
10. Johke Boezaart
12. Lindsey Carlisle (c)
15. Pietie Coetzee
16. Jenny Wilson
17. Lesle-Ann George
21. Lenise Marais
24. Fiona Butler
26. Kim Hubach
28. Tsoanelo Pholo
29. Tarryn Bright
30. Sharne Wehmeyer
32. Grazjyna Engelbrecht (GK)
United States

Head Coach: Lee Bodimeade

2. Melissa Leonetti
3. Angie Loy
4. Kelly Doton
5. Tara Jelley
6. Robyn Kenney
7. Lauren Crandall
8. Kristen Holmes
9. Sarah Dawson
10. Tiffany Snow
11. Sara Silvetti
16. Barbara Weinberg (GK)
17. Carrie Lingo
20. Katie O'Donnell
22. Kate Barber (c)
24. Dina Rizzo
25. Amy Tran (GK)
26. Kristi Gannon
28. Lauren Powley

== Umpires ==
- Sarah Garnett (NZL)
- Dawn Henning (ENG)
- Tetyana Kaltypan (UKR)
- Jun Kentwell (USA)
- Anne McRae (SCO)
- Lourdes Santiago (ESP)
- Cecelia Valenzuela (CHI)
- Kazuko Yasueda (JPN)

== Results ==
All times are Eastern Standard Time (UTC−04:00)

=== Group stage ===
Pos	Team	Pld	W	D	L	GF	GA	GD	Pts	Qualification
1	South Africa	5	4	0	1	7	5	+2	12	Advanced to Final
2	New Zealand	5	3	1	1	8	4	+4	10	Advanced to Final
3	England	5	3	1	1	11	8	+3	10	
4	Japan	5	2	0	3	11	10	+1	6	
5	United States (H)	5	1	0	4	7	11	−4	3	
6	Spain	5	1	0	4	7	13	−6	3	

Source: FIH
Rules for classification: 1) points; 2) goal difference; 3) goals scored; 4) head-to-head result.
(H) Hosts

==== Fixtures ====
8 July 2005
16:00

Spain	5–2	Japan
Gómez 33'; Piñeiro 39'; Ybarra 42'; Huertas 44'; Termens 70+'	Report	Morimoto 28'; Nakagawa 35'

Umpires:
Sarah Garnett (NZL)
Cecilia Valenzuela (CHL)

8 July 2005
18:00

England	1–1	New Zealand
King 27'	Report	Sharland 39'

Umpires:
Kazuko Yasueda (JPN)
Jun Kentwell (USA)

8 July 2005
20:00

United States	1–2	South Africa
Loy 33'	Report	Coetzee 39'; Bright 47'

Umpires:
Dawn Henning (ENG)
Anne McRae (SCO)

9 July 2005
16:00

Japan	4–0	England
Tsukui 13', 31'; Ono 48'; Nakagawa 60'	Report

Umpires:
Sarah Garnett (NZL)
Lourdes Santiago (ESP)

9 July 2005
18:00

South Africa	2–0	Spain
Wilson 21'; Coetzee 67'	Report

Umpires:
Kazuko Yasueda (JPN)
Anne McRae (SCO)

9 July 2005
20:00

New Zealand	2–1	United States
Provan 2'; Muirhead 8'	Report	Snow 59'

Umpires:
Dawn Henning (ENG)
Cecilia Valenzuela (CHL)

11 July 2005
18:00

Spain	0–3	New Zealand
	Report	Igasan 16', 29'; Muirhead 43'

Umpires:
Anne McRae (SCO)
Jun Kentwell (USA)

11 July 2005
20:00

United States	1–3	Japan
Snow 28'	Report	Chiba 25'; Komori 56', 66'

Umpires:
Sarah Garnett (NZL)
Tetyana Kaltypan (UKR)

12 July 2005
18:00

England	4–1	Spain
Cullen 28'; Walton 31', 42'; Bimson 69'	Report	Prat 17'

Umpires:
Cecilia Valenzuela (CHL)
Jun Kentwell (USA)

12 July 2005
20:00

South Africa	2–1	Japan
Wilson 10'; Wehmeyer 16'	Report	Kato 65'

Umpires:
Lourdes Santiago (ESP)
Dawn Henning (ENG)

13 July 2005
18:00

New Zealand	0–1	South Africa
	Report	Bright 6'

Umpires:
Kazuko Yasueda (JPN)
Anne McRae (SCO)

13 July 2005
20:00

United States	2–3	England
Lingo 47'; Loy 70+'	Report	Walsh 6'; Wright 41'; Cullen 56'

Umpires:
Sarah Garnett (NZL)
Cecilia Valenzuela (CHL)

14 July 2005
20:00

Spain	1–2	United States
Muñoz 70+'	Report	Rizzo 30'; Kenney 46'

Umpires:
Anne McRae (SCO)
Tetyana Kaltypan (UKR)

15 July 2005
18:00

Japan	1–2	New Zealand
Morimoto 35'	Report	Ryan 20'; Dillon 60'

Umpires:
Dawn Henning (ENG)
Cecilia Valenzuela (CHL)

15 July 2005
20:00

England	3–0	South Africa
Clewlow 14'; Grant 44', 55'	Report

Umpires:
Sarah Garnett (NZL)
Jun Kentwell (USA)

=== Classification matches ===
==== Fifth and sixth place ====
16 July 2005
16:00

United States	5–3	Spain
Doton 2', 59'; Loy 15'; Barber 48'; O'Donnell 51'	Report	Termens 10'; Prat 11'; Ybarra 53'

Umpires:
Sarah Garnett (NZL)
Cecilia Valenzuela (CHL)

==== Third and fourth place ====
16 July 2005
19:55

England	1–2	Japan
King 25'	Report	Komori 42'; Chiba 67'

Umpires:
Lourdes Santiago (ESP)
Jun Kentwall (USA)

==== Final ====
16 July 2005
22:00

South Africa	0–2	New Zealand
	Report	Orr 37'; Roberts-Lang 48'

Umpires:
Kazuko Yasueda (JPN)
Anne McRae (SCO)

== Awards ==
The following awards were presented at the conclusion of the tournament:

Player of the Tournament	Top Goalscorers	Goalkeeper of the Tournament
(New Zealand) Elizabeth Igasan	(Japan) Tomomi Komori (United States) Angela Loy	(United States) Amy Tran

== Statistics ==
=== Final standings ===
Pos	Team	Pld	W	D	L	GF	GA	GD	Pts	Qualification
1st place, gold medalist(s)	New Zealand	6	4	1	1	10	4	+6	13	Qualified for FIH Champions Trophy
2nd place, silver medalist(s)	South Africa	6	4	0	2	7	7	0	12	
3rd place, bronze medalist(s)	Japan	6	3	0	3	13	11	+2	9	
4	England	6	3	1	2	12	10	+2	10	
5	United States (H)	6	2	0	4	12	14	−2	6	
6	Spain	6	1	0	5	10	18	−8	3	

Source: FIH
(H) Hosts

=== Goalscorers ===
There were 64 goals scored in 18 matches, for an average of 3.56 goals per match.

3 goals

- (Japan) Tomomi Komori
- (United States) Angela Loy

2 goals

- (England) Tina Cullen
- (England) Helen Grant
- (England) Leisa King
- (England) Sally Walton
- (Japan) Kaori Chiba
- (Japan) Sakae Morimoto
- (Japan) Miyuki Nakagawa
- (Japan) Toshie Tsukui
- (New Zealand) Elizabeth Igasan
- (New Zealand) Suzanne Muirhead
- (South Africa) Tarryn Bright
- (South Africa) Pietie Coetzee
- (South Africa) Jennifer Wilson
- (Spain) Marta Prat
- (Spain) Esther Termens
- (Spain) Rocío Ybarra
- (United States) Kelly Doton
- (United States) Tiffany Snow

1 goal

- (England) Jennifer Bimson
- (England) Melanie Clewlow
- (England) Kate Walsh
- (England) Lucilla Wright
- (Japan) Akemi Kato
- (Japan) Mayumi Ono
- (New Zealand) Honor Dillon
- (New Zealand) Meredith Orr
- (New Zealand) Jaimee Provan
- (New Zealand) Niniwa Roberts-Lang
- (New Zealand) Elizabeth Ryan
- (New Zealand) Kayla Sharland
- (South Africa) Sharne Wehmeyer
- (Spain) María Gómez
- (Spain) Raquel Huertas
- (Spain) Silvia Muñoz
- (Spain) Olalla Piñeiro
- (United States) Katherine Barber
- (United States) Robyn Kenney
- (United States) Carrie Lingo
- (United States) Kathleen O'Donnell
- (United States) Dina Rizzo
