= 2007 Women's Oceania Cup =

Field hockey tournament

2007 Oceania Cup
Tournament details
- Host country: Australia
- City: Buderim
- Dates: 11–16 September
- Venue: Sunshine Coast Hockey Centre

Final positions
- Champions: New Zealand (1st title)
- Runner-up: Australia
- Third place: Fiji

Tournament statistics
- Matches played: 8
- Goals scored: 85 (10.63 per match)
- Top scorer: (New Zealand) Jaimee Claxton (7 goals)

The 2007 Women's Oceania Cup was the fifth edition of the women's field hockey tournament. It was held from 11 to 16 September in Buderim.

The tournament served as a qualifier for the 2008 Olympic Games.

New Zealand won the tournament for the first time, defeating Australia 1–0 in the final.

== Teams ==
- Australia
- Fiji
- New Zealand
- Papua New Guinea

== Results ==
All times are local (AEST).

=== Preliminary round ===
==== Pool ====
Pos	Team	Pld	W	D	L	GF	GA	GD	Pts	Qualification
1	Australia (H)	3	3	0	0	32	0	+32	9	Advance to Final and 2008 Olympic Games
2	New Zealand	3	2	0	1	39	2	+37	6	Advance to Final and 2008 Olympic Games
3	Fiji	3	1	0	2	6	29	−23	3	
4	Papua New Guinea	3	0	0	3	1	47	−46	0	

Source: Hockey Australia
Rules for classification: 1) points; 2) goal difference; 3) goals scored; 4) head-to-head result.
(H) Hosts

==== Fixtures ====
11 September 2007
16:30

Australia	14–0	Fiji
Sanders 7', 48'; Blyth 8', 30', 38', 58'; Munro 18', 49'; Eastham 22'; Rivers 29'; Hudson 44', 52'; Lambert 68', 70'	Report

Umpires:
Lesley Nunn (RSA)
Sarah Garnett (NZL)

14 September 2007
16:30

New Zealand	25–0	Papua New Guinea
Igasan 2', 65'; Forgesson 6', 20', 59'; Sharland 8'; Orr 9'; Dillon 11', 45'; Saunders 13', 30'; Harrison 19', 35'; Paewai 31', 51', 61', 64', 66'; Claxton 36', 38', 42', 46', 60'; Noakes 38'; Naylor 44'	Report

Umpires:
Kazuko Yasueda (JPN)
Julie Ashton-Lucy (AUS)

12 September 2007
16:30

Fiji	5–1	Papua New Guinea
Semisi 2', 5', 15'; Thaggard 44'; Nawaqakuta 47'	Report	Evans 29'

Umpires:
Julie Ashton-Lucy (AUS)
Sarah Garnett (NZL)

12 September 2007
18:30

New Zealand	0–1	Australia
	Report	Blyth 63'

Umpires:
Lesley Nunn (RSA)
Kazuko Yasueda (JPN)

14 September 2007
16:30

Fiji	1–14	New Zealand
Taito 23'	Report	Dillon 4'; Sharland 6', 45', 62'; Orr 14'; Igasan 24', 27'; Claxton 31', 33'; Harrison 34', 51', 58'; Roberts 49', 68'

Umpires:
Julie Ashton-Lucy (AUS)
Lesley Nunn (RSA)

14 September 2007
18:30

Australia	17–0	Papua New Guinea
Halliday 2'; Attard 5', 22', 34'; Lambert 12', 52'; Hudson 13', 69'; Taylor 18', 63', 70'; Eastham 21'; Hollywood 32', 39'; Arrold 41'; Rivers 47', 60'	Report

Umpires:
Sarah Garnett (NZL)
Kazuko Yasueda (JPN)

=== Classification round ===
==== Third and fourth place ====
16 September 2007
09:30

Fiji	6–0	Papua New Guinea
Thaggard 6', 23', 65', 70'; Semisi 19', 27'	Report

Umpires:
Sarah Garnett (NZL)
Julie Ashton-Lucy (AUS)

==== Final ====
16 September 2007
16:30

Australia	0–1	New Zealand
	Report	Forgesson 55'

Umpires:
Kazuko Yasueda (JPN)
Lesley Nunn (RSA)

== Statistics ==
=== Final standings ===
As per statistical convention in field hockey, matches decided in extra time are counted as wins and losses, while matches decided by penalty shoot-outs are counted as draws.

Pos	Team	Pld	W	D	L	GF	GA	GD	Pts	Status
1st place, gold medalist(s)	New Zealand	4	3	0	1	40	2	+38	9	Qualified for 2008 Olympic Games
2nd place, silver medalist(s)	Australia (H)	4	3	0	1	32	1	+31	9	Qualified for 2008 Olympic Games
3rd place, bronze medalist(s)	Fiji	4	2	0	2	12	29	−17	6	
4	Papua New Guinea	4	0	0	4	1	53	−52	0	

Source: Hockey Australia
(H) Hosts

=== Goalscorers ===
There were 85 goals scored in 8 matches, for an average of 10.6 goals per match.

7 goals

- (New Zealand) Jaimee Claxton

5 goals

- (Australia) Madonna Blyth
- (Fiji) Emelina Semisi
- (Fiji) Catherine Thaggard
- (New Zealand) Charlotte Harrison
- (New Zealand) Caryn Paewai

4 goals

- (Australia) Nicole Hudson
- (Australia) Angela Lambert
- (New Zealand) Krystal Forgesson
- (New Zealand) Elizabeth Igasan
- (New Zealand) Kayla Sharland

3 goals

- (Australia) Teneal Attard
- (Australia) Megan Rivers
- (Australia) Sarah Taylor
- (New Zealand) Honor Dillon

2 goals

- (Australia) Casey Eastham
- (Australia) Kate Hollywood
- (Australia) Hope Munro
- (Australia) Rebecca Sanders
- (New Zealand) Meredith Orr
- (New Zealand) Niniwa Roberts
- (New Zealand) Kate Saunders

1 goal

- (Australia) Nicole Arrold
- (Australia) Emily Halliday
- (Fiji) Emi Nawaqakuta
- (Fiji) Rita Taito
- (New Zealand) Emily Naylor
- (New Zealand) Kimberley Noakes
- (Papua New Guinea) Monica Evans
