= 2005 Women's Oceania Cup =

Field hockey tournament

2005 Oceania Cup
Tournament details
- Host country: Australia; New Zealand
- Dates: 30 October – 5 November
- Venue: 2 (in 2 host cities)

Final positions
- Champions: Australia (4th title)
- Runner-up: New Zealand

Tournament statistics
- Matches played: 3
- Goals scored: 7 (2.33 per match)
- Top scorer: 7 Players (see list below) (1 goals)

The 2005 Women's Oceania Cup was the fourth edition of the women's field hockey tournament. It was held from 30 October to 5 November in Auckland and Sydney.

The tournament served as a qualifier for the 2006 FIH World Cup.

Australia won the tournament for the fourth time, defeating New Zealand in the three–game series, 2–1.

== Squads ==
Australia

Head Coach: Frank Murray

1. Toni Cronk (GK)
2. Suzanne Faulkner
3. Karen Smith
6. Megan Rivers
7. Kimberley Walker
9. Rebecca Sanders
10. Kate Hollywood
11. Emily Halliday
12. Madonna Blyth
13. Wendy Alcorn
14. Nicole Arrold
15. Kobie McGurk
17. Rachel Imison (GK)
18. Emma Meyer
19. Donna-Lee Patrick
24. Angela Skirving
25. Melanie Twitt (C)
32. Nicole Hudson
New Zealand
1. Kayla Sharland
2. Emily Naylor
3. Krystal Forgesson
6. Meredith Orr
7. Moira Senior
9. Honor Dillon
10. Elizabeth Igasan
11. Stacey Carr
14. Suzanne Muirhead
15. Bethany Jurgeleit (GK)
16. Clarissa Eshuis
17. Caryn Paewai
18. Diana Weavers (C)
20. Frances Kreft
21. Niniwa Roberts-Lang
26. Anita Wawatai (GK)
28. Charlotte Harrison
29. Michelle Hollands

== Results ==
=== Pool ===
Pos	Team	Pld	W	D	L	GF	GA	GD	Pts	Qualification
1	Australia	3	2	0	1	6	1	+5	6	2006 FIH World Cup
2	New Zealand	3	1	0	2	1	6	−5	3	

Source: Hockey Australia
Rules for classification: 1) points; 2) goal difference; 3) goals scored; 4) head-to-head result.

=== Fixtures ===
30 October 2005
13:15 (NZDT)

New Zealand	1–0	Australia
Dillon 39'	Report

Lloyd Elsmore Hockey Stadium, Auckland
Umpires:
Soledad Iparraguirre (ARG)
Chieko Akiyama (JPN)

3 November 2005
19:00 (AEDT)

Australia	4–0	New Zealand
Blyth 46'; Smith 49'; Halliday 57'; Skirving 67'	Report

Sydney Olympic Park, Sydney
Umpires:
Chieko Akiyama (JPN)
Soledad Iparraguirre (ARG)

5 November 2005
14:00 (AEDT)

Australia	2–0	New Zealand
Faulkner 27'; Alcorn 41'	Report

Sydney Olympic Park, Sydney
Umpires:
Soledad Iparraguirre (ARG)
Chieko Akiyama (JPN)

== Statistics ==
=== Final standings ===
1. Australia
2. New Zealand

=== Goalscorers ===
There were 7 goals scored in 3 matches, for an average of 2.33 goals per match.

1 goal

- (Australia) Wendy Alcorn
- (Australia) Madonna Blyth
- (Australia) Suzanne Faulkner
- (Australia) Emily Halliday
- (Australia) Angela Skirving
- (Australia) Karen Smith
- (New Zealand) Honor Dillon

Source: Hockey Australia
