= Emma Stewart =

Australian field hockey player

Personal information
- Born: 11 July 1983 (age 43) Brisbane, Australia

Sport
- Sport: Field hockey
- Position: Defence
Senior career
Years	Team	Caps	Goals
2002–2008	Queensland Scorchers	-	-
National team
Years	Team	Caps	Goals
2002–2004	Australia U–21	7	(3)
2002–2008	Australia	62	(0)
Medal record
Women's field hockey
Representing Australia
Oceania Cup
Gold medal – first place	2005 Auckland–Sydney
Silver medal – second place	2007 Buderim
FIH Champions Trophy
Silver medal – second place	2005 Canberra
Junior Oceania Cup
Gold medal – first place	2004 Wellington

Emma Stewart (née Meyer, born 11 July 1983) is a former international field hockey player from Australia.

== Personal life ==
Stewart was born in Brisbane, Queensland, and grew up in the nearby suburb of Petrie.

== Career ==
=== National league ===
In the Australian Hockey League, Stewart represented her home state of Queensland. From 2002 until 2008, she was a member of the Queensland Scorchers. During her fourth season with the Scorchers, she helped the side to win their second title.

=== Under-21 ===
She was a member of the Australia U–21 squad from 2002 to 2004. During this time she made seven appearances for the side, including a gold medal win at the 2004 Junior Oceania Cup in Wellington.

=== Hockeyroos ===
Stewart made her senior international debut for the Hockeyroos in 2002. She earned her first senior cap during a match against Russia at a Six Nations Tournament in Gifu.

She didn't represent the national team again until 2004, when she was named in the squad for her first major international tournament. She competed at the FIH Champions Trophy in Rosario, where the team finished in fourth place.

From 2005 to 2007, she became a constant inclusion in the national squad, winning medals at three major tournaments. She won a gold medal at the 2005 Oceania Cup held in Auckland and Sydney, followed by silver at the next edition in 2007 held in Buderim. She also won a silver medal at the 2005 FIH Champions Trophy in Canberra.

Major International Tournaments

During her international career, Stewart competed in the following major tournaments:

- 2004 FIH Champions Trophy – Rosario
- 2005 Oceania Cup – Auckland and Sydney
- 2005 FIH Champions Trophy – Canberra
- 2007 FIH Champions Trophy – Quilmes
- 2007 Good Luck Beijing Tournament – Beijing
- 2007 Oceania Cup – Buderim

== Recognition ==
In 2020, she was inducted into the Hockey Queensland Hall of Fame.

She was also named in the Queensland Scorchers team of the decade (2005–2015).
