= 2007 Women's Hockey Champions Challenge =

International field hockey tournament

2007 Women's Hockey Champions Challenge I
Tournament details
- Host country: Azerbaijan
- City: Baku
- Dates: 9–17 June
- Teams: 6

Final positions
- Champions: China (1st title)
- Runner-up: South Korea
- Third place: England

Tournament statistics
- Matches played: 18
- Goals scored: 64 (3.56 per match)
- Top scorer: (South Korea) Cheon Seul-ki (6 goals)

The 2007 Women's Hockey Champions Challenge I was the 4th edition of the Champions Challenge I for women.

China won the tournament for the first time, defeating South Korea 2–1 in the final.

== Teams ==
Alongside the host nation, 5 teams competed in the tournament.

- Azerbaijan (host nation)
- China
- England
- New Zealand
- South Korea
- United States

== Results ==
=== Preliminary round ===
Pos	Team	Pld	W	D	L	GF	GA	GD	Pts	Qualification
1	China	5	4	0	1	17	4	+13	12	Final
2	South Korea	5	4	0	1	13	8	+5	12	Final
3	United States	5	3	1	1	7	6	+1	10	Third place game
4	England	5	2	1	2	7	10	−3	7	Third place game
5	New Zealand	5	1	0	4	3	13	−10	3	Fifth place game
6	Azerbaijan (H)	5	0	0	5	4	10	−6	0	Fifth place game

Source: FIH
Rules for classification: 1) points; 2) goal difference; 3) goals scored; 4) head-to-head result.
(H) Hosts

9 June 2007
13:00

United States	0–2	South Korea
	Report	Cheon 7'; Han 31'

Umpires:
Sarah Garnett (NZL)
Lisette Klaassen (NED)

9 June 2007
15:15

New Zealand	0–1	England
	Report	Gilliat-Smith 11'

Umpires:
Minka Woolley (AUS)
Elena Eskina (RUS)

9 June 2007
18:00

China	2–0	Azerbaijan
Fu 58'; Ma 70+'	Report

Umpires:
Dawn Henning (ENG)
Nor Piza Hassan (MAS)

10 June 2007
13:30

South Korea	4–2	England
Seo 10'; Kim Ju. 12'; Kim E. 30'; Cheon 67'	Report	Cullen 9'; Walsh 70'

Umpires:
Miao Lin (CHN)
Nor Piza Hassan (MAS)

10 June 2007
15:45

China	1–2	United States
Song 65'	Report	Dawson 33'; Kasold 53'

Umpires:
Minka Woolley (AUS)
Elena Eskina (RUS)

10 June 2007
18:00

Azerbaijan	0–1	New Zealand
	Report	Paewai 27'

Umpires:
Lee Keum-ju (KOR)
Lisette Klaassen (NED)

12 June 2007
13:30

New Zealand	1–8	China
Saunders 69'	Report	Song 20', 70'; Xing 29', 65'; Tang 35'; Ma 39'; Li 47', 49'

Umpires:
Dawn Henning (ENG)
Lee Keum-ju (KOR)

12 June 2007
15:45

England	2–2	United States
Clewlow 45'; Danson 48'	Report	Sensenig 17'; Fronzoni 67'

Umpires:
Elena Eskina (RUS)
Sarah Garnett (NZL)

12 June 2007
18:00

Azerbaijan	3–4	South Korea
Mirzaliyeva 18'; Z. Nuriyeva 35'; M. Aliyeva 66'	Report	Park S. 12'; Im 27'; Cheon 42'; Park M. 53'

Umpires:
Minka Woolley (AUS)
Miao Lin (CHN)

14 June 2007
13:30

United States	1–0	New Zealand
Fronzoni 70+'	Report

Umpires:
Dawn Henning (ENG)
Nor Piza Hassan (MAS)

14 June 2007
15:45

South Korea	0–2	China
	Report	Sun 18'; Tang 27'

Umpires:
Sarah Garnett (NZL)
Lisette Klaassen (NED)

14 June 2007
18:00

England	1–0	Azerbaijan
Walker 61'	Report

Umpires:
Miao Lin (CHN)
Lee Keum-ju (KOR)

16 June 2007
12:00

China	4–1	England
Ren 13'; Ma 16', 33'; Fu 26'	Report	Danson 61'

Umpires:
Sarah Garnett (NZL)
Minka Woolley (AUS)

16 June 2007
14:15

New Zealand	1–3	South Korea
Dillon 5'	Report	Kim Jo. 23'; Cheon 30', 69'

Umpires:
Elena Eskina (RUS)
Miao Lin (CHN)

16 June 2007
16:30

Azerbaijan	1–2	United States
Jafarova 38'	Report	Fronzoni 43'; Crandall 64'

Umpires:
Dawn Henning (ENG)
Lisette Klaassen (NED)

=== Classification round ===
==== Fifth and sixth place ====
17 June 2007
13:00

New Zealand	4–3 (a.e.t.)	Azerbaijan
Paewai 54'; Saunders 63', 65', 80'	Report	M. Aliyeva 6'; L. Nuriyeva 29'; Zeynalova 43'

Umpires:
Dawn Henning (AUS)
Lee Keum-ju (KOR)

==== Third and fourth place ====
17 June 2007
15:30

United States	1–2	England
Sensenig 36'	Report	Gilliat-Smith 39'; Walker 43'

Umpires:
Nor Piza Hassan (MAS)
Miao Lin (CHN)

==== Final ====
17 June 2007
18:00

China	2–1	South Korea
Ma 12'; Tang 61'	Report	Cheon 30'

Umpires:
Minka Woolley (AUS)
Sarah Garnett (NZL)

== Statistics ==
=== Final standings ===
1. China
2. South Korea
3. England
4. United States
5. New Zealand
6. Azerbaijan
