= Robyn Kenney =

American field hockey player (born 1979)

Robyn Kenney (born February 6, 1979, in Plainfield, New Jersey) is a field hockey midfielder from the United States, who earned her first senior career cap vs Russia on May 2, 2002. Kenney attended Boston University. Kenney injured her right arm during a practice session in 2004, but healed quickly to continue playing in 2005. She moved up the ranks and eventually retired from the USA Field Hockey National Team in 2006, having played in 37 matches since 2002.

== Biography ==
Kenney grew up in Readington Township, New Jersey, and attended Hunterdon Central Regional High School, from which she graduated in 1997. She graduated from Boston University in 2001 with a degree in environmental science. Kenney has lived in the Whitehouse Station section of Readington Township. At Boston University, Kenney was on the school's field hockey team where she helped Boston University win back-to-back conference championships and was named All American her junior and senior year.

In 2006, Kenney earned a master's degree in environmental science. She worked for the EPA in Ohio and also serves as an assistant coach for the Ohio State Buckeyes field hockey team.

Kenney was inducted into Boston University's Athletic Hall of Fame on November 4, 2017.

Kenney is the founder and director of Mind Body Athletics. She is now a mental trainer and mindfulness instructor for a variety of clubs, teams and athletes in Alexandria, Virginia.

== International senior competitions ==
- 2002 – USA vs India WC Qualifying Series, Cannock (1st)
- 2003 – Champions Challenge, Catania (5th)
- 2003 – Pan American Games, Santo Domingo (2nd)
- 2005 – Champions Challenge, Virginia Beach (5th)
- 2006 – World Cup Qualifier, Rome (4th)
