= Fiji women's national field hockey team =

Fiji
- Association: OHF (Oceania)
- Confederation: Fiji Hockey Federation

FIH ranking
- Current: 43 ▲2 (3 October 2026)

Oceania Cup
- Appearances: 1 (first in 2007)
- Best result: (bronze) 3rd (2007)
Medal record
Oceania Cup
Bronze medal – third place	2007 Buderim

The Fiji women's national field hockey team represents Fiji in international field hockey competitions and is controlled by the Fiji Hockey Federation.

== Results ==
=== Oceania Cup ===
- 2007 – (bronze)

=== Hockey World League ===
- 2012–13 – Second round
- 2014–15 – First round
- 2016–17 – First round

=== FIH Hockey Series ===
- 2018–19 – Second round

=== Pacific Games ===
- 2003 – (gold)
- 2007 – (gold)
- 2015 – (gold)

== See also ==
- Fiji men's national field hockey team
