= Elizabeth Ryan (field hockey) =

New Zealand field hockey player

Personal information
- Born: 10 November 1985 (age 40)
Medal record
Women's field hockey
Representing New Zealand
Champions Challenge
Gold medal – first place	2005 Virginia Beach	Team

Elizabeth ("Lizzy") Ryan (born 10 November 1985 in Hamilton, New Zealand) is a field hockey striker from New Zealand.

== International senior competitions ==
- 2005 – Champions Challenge, Virgiania Beach
- 2006 – World Cup Qualifier, Rome
