= Tsoanelo Pholo =

South African field hockey player

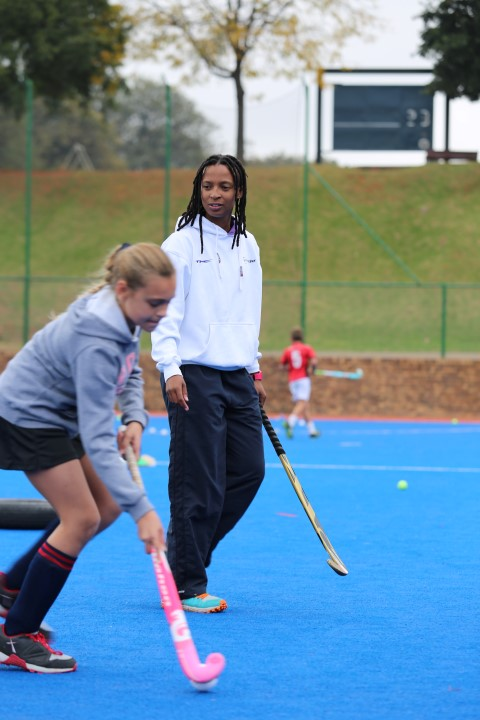
- Pholo coaching at Investec Academy Training

Personal information
- Born: 13 December 1982 (age 43) Maseru, Lesotho

Sport
- Sport: Field hockey
National team
Years	Team	Caps	Goals
2004-2006	South Africa	51	(7)
2007	Indoor South Africa	6	(1)
Coaching career
- Years: Team
- present: Hong Kong Women's
- present: Hong Kong Bauhinia
- 2019-2024: University of Johannesburg
- 2022-2024: Southern Gauteng Junior
- 2018: South African Junior
- 2017: Madikwe Rangers
Medal record
Representing South Africa
All-Africa Games
Gold medal – first place	2003 Abuja	Team
Champions Challenge
Silver medal – second place	2005 Virginia Beach	Team
Africa Cup of Nations
Gold medal – first place	2005 Pretoria

Tsoanelo Pholo (born 13 December 1982 in Johannesburg) is a field hockey player, High Performance Coach and Coach Educator from South Africa, who was a member of the national team that finished 9th at the 2004 Summer Olympics in Athens.

She was born in Maseru, Lesotho and later moved to Johannesburg where she still resides, and she is nicknamed Coach. Pholo played for a provincial team called Southern Gauteng. She was recruited to represent South Africa in the touch rugby Touch World Cup in 1999 at the age of 16. She also played soccer. After her retirement from playing international hockey, Pholo pursued her coaching ambitions.

As a coach, Pholo is an FIH (International Hockey Federation) Level 4 Accredited Field Hockey coach, FIH Coach Educator and FIH Trainer. She was head coach of the women's 1st team at the University of Johannesburg, head coach of the Southern Gauteng provincial Junior (Under 21) team, and she coached the South African team which won the 2018 African Youth Games in Algiers, Algeria and were semi-finalists at the 2018 Youth Olympic Games in Buenos Aires, Argentina.

She led the South African Senior Hockey5s team to a semi-final spot at the inaugural 2024 FIH Women's Hockey5s World Cup and was the striker coach for the South Africa men's national field hockey team which scored 16 goals at the 2024 Summer Olympics.

She led the Hong Kong Women’s Hockey Program (u12 - Senior Team) from 2024 to 2026.

== International senior tournaments ==
- 2003 – All Africa Games (Abuja, Nigeria)
- 2004 – Olympic Games (Athens, Greece)
- 2005 – Champions Challenge (Virginia Beach, United States)
- 2006 – World Cup (Madrid, Spain)
- 2007 – World Cup (Vienna, Austria)
