= Becky Duggan =

English footballer

Becky Waters (Duggan)
Personal information
- Full name: Rebecca Waters (Duggan)
- Date of birth: 10 June 1983 (age 43)
- Place of birth: Twickenham, England
- Position: Defender

Youth career
- Chelsea Ladies

Senior career*
Years	Team	Apps	(Gls)
2001–2005	Chelsea Ladies		
2006–2007	AFC Wimbledon Ladies		
2007–2009	Crystal Palace Ladies		
2009	Fulham Ladies		
2009–2012	Charlton Athletic Ladies		
- * Club domestic league appearances and goals

Becky Duggan
Medal record

Women's field hockey

Representing England

European Championship
Bronze medal – third place	2005 Dublin	Team Competition
Bronze medal – third place	2009 Amsterdam	Team Competition

Rebecca Waters (née Duggan; born 10 June 1983) is an English field hockey goalkeeper. She made her senior international debut for the England women's national field hockey team on 19 April 2003 and made one appearance for the Great Britain national women's field hockey team, against South Africa on 10 January 2007.

Duggan was also a footballer and played outfield for several teams in the FA Women's Premier League Southern Division. She joined Charlton Athletic from Fulham in December 2009.

== Hockey ==
Duggan was part of the England squad for 2005 Women's EuroHockey Nations Championship, the 2005 Women's Hockey Champions Challenge and the 2006 Commonwealth Games. She later played in the 2009 Women's EuroHockey Nations Championship semi final defeat to Germany.

In 2006, Duggan appeared in a Push Hockey magazine photoshoot dressed as Uma Thurman's character from Kill Bill.

== Football ==
Duggan began her football career with Chelsea Ladies. She was named Most Improved Player in 2001-02 and won a County Cup in the two following seasons.

She has also featured for AFC Wimbledon, Crystal Palace and Fulham.
