= Caroline Jack =

South African field hockey player

Personal information
- Born: 29 July 1978 (age 47)
Medal record
Women's field hockey
Representing South Africa
All-Africa Games
Gold medal – first place	2003 Abuja	Team
Afro-Asian Games
Silver medal – second place	2003 Hyderabad	Team
Champions Challenge
Silver medal – second place	2005 Virginia Beach	Team

Caroline Jack (born 29 July 1978 in Port Elizabeth) is a field hockey goalkeeper from South Africa, who represented her native country at the 2004 Summer Olympics in Athens. There the women's national team finished in ninth position.

Jack's hometown is Grahamstown. Her maiden name is Birt and therefore she is nicknamed Birty. She plays for a provincial team called Southern Gauteng. Her international debut for South Africa was in 1998, during the Africa Cup in Harare.

== International senior tournaments ==
- 2002 – Champions Challenge, Johannesburg
- 2002 – Commonwealth Games, Manchester
- 2002 – World Cup, Perth
- 2003 – All Africa Games, Abuja
- 2003 – Afro-Asian Games, India
- 2004 – Olympic Games, Athens
- 2005 – Champions Challenge, Virginia Beach
- 2006 – Commonwealth Games, Melbourne
- 2006 – World Cup, Madrid, Spain
