= John Sheahan (field hockey) =

Australian field hockey player and coach

John Sheahan (born 1972) is an Australian-born field hockey coach, who is a graduate of Tenri University where the majority of the men's and women's national team graduated. Sheahan has two master's degrees in sports science and has been coaching the men's and women's university teams since graduating himself. He led the women's team since 2005.
