= Lucilla Wright =

English field hockey player

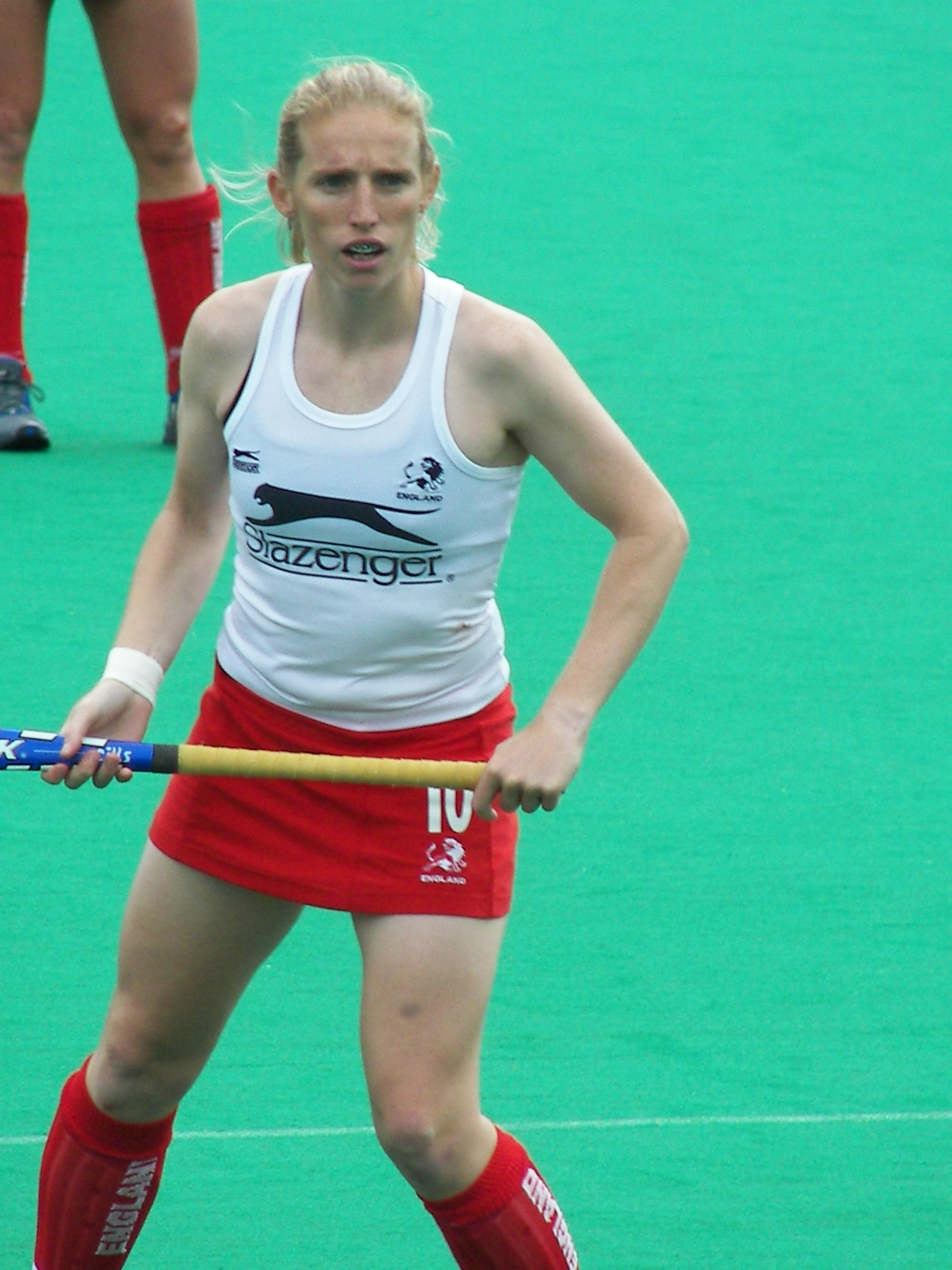

Personal information
- Nationality: English
- Born: 24 December 1979 (age 46) Birmingham, West Midlands

Sport
- Sport: Field Hockey
- Club: Olton & West Warwickshire
Medal record
Women's field hockey
Representing England
European Championship
| Bronze medal – third place | 1999 Cologne | Team |
| Bronze medal – third place | 2005 Dublin | Team |
| Bronze medal – third place | 2007 Manchester | Team |
Commonwealth Games
| Silver medal – second place | 1998 Kuala Lumpur | Team |
| Silver medal – second place | 2002 Manchester | Team |
| Bronze medal – third place | 2006 Melbourne | Team |
Champions Challenge
| Gold medal – first place | 2002 Johannesburg | Team |
| Bronze medal – third place | 2007 Baku | Team |

Lucilla Mary Wright (born 24 December 1979 in Birmingham, West Midlands) is a female former English field hockey international.

== Hockey career ==
Wright was a member of the England and Great Britain women's field hockey teams during the late 1990s and 2000s.

She represented England and won a silver medal, at the 1998 Commonwealth Games in Kuala Lumpur, Malaysia. Four years later she won a second silver medal at the 2002 Commonwealth Games and won a bronze medal in 2006. She played for Olton & West Warwickshire Hockey Club.
