= Katy Roberts =

English field hockey player

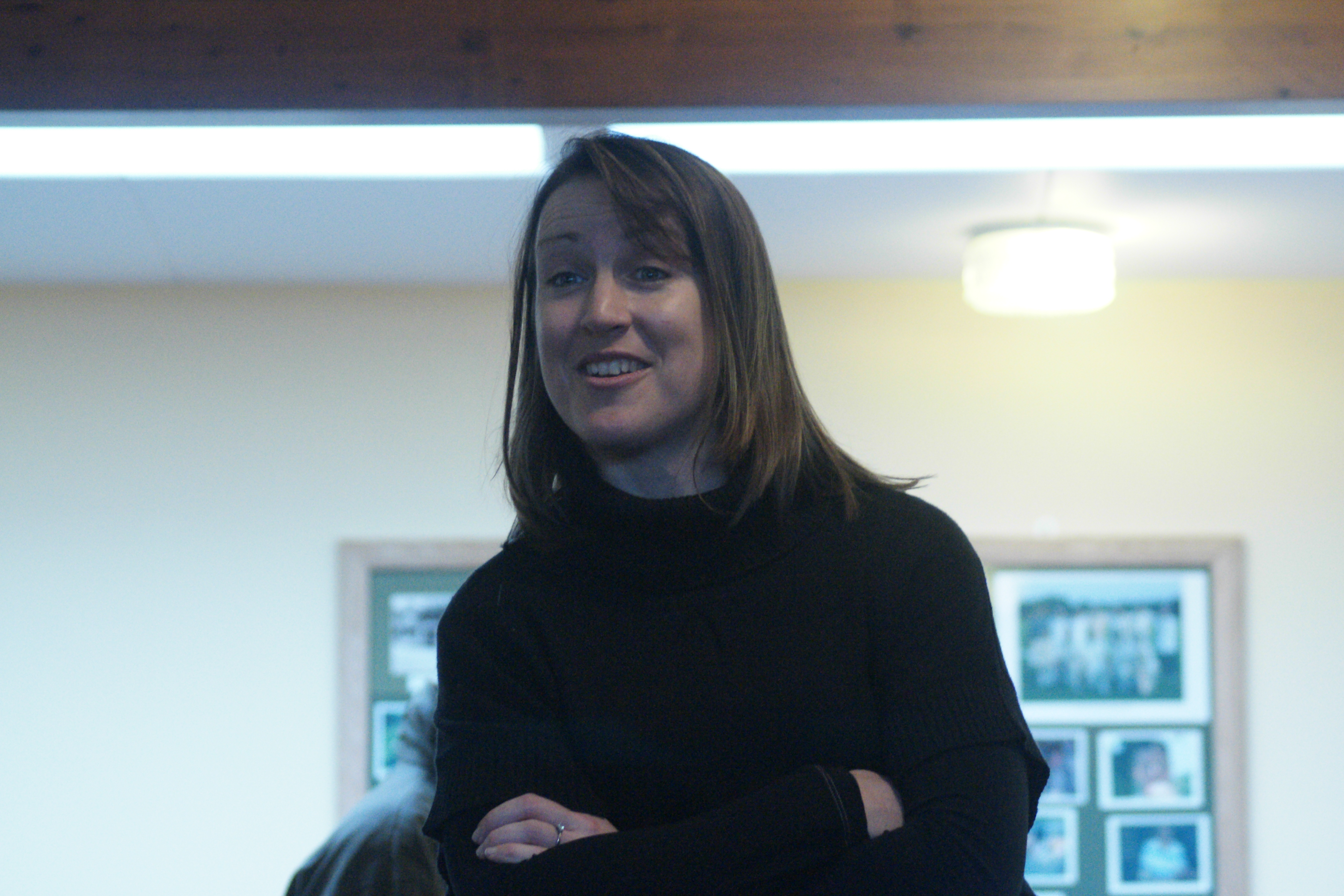
Katy Roberts

Katy Roberts is a field hockey player from England.
