= Cathy Gilliat-Smith =

English field hockey player

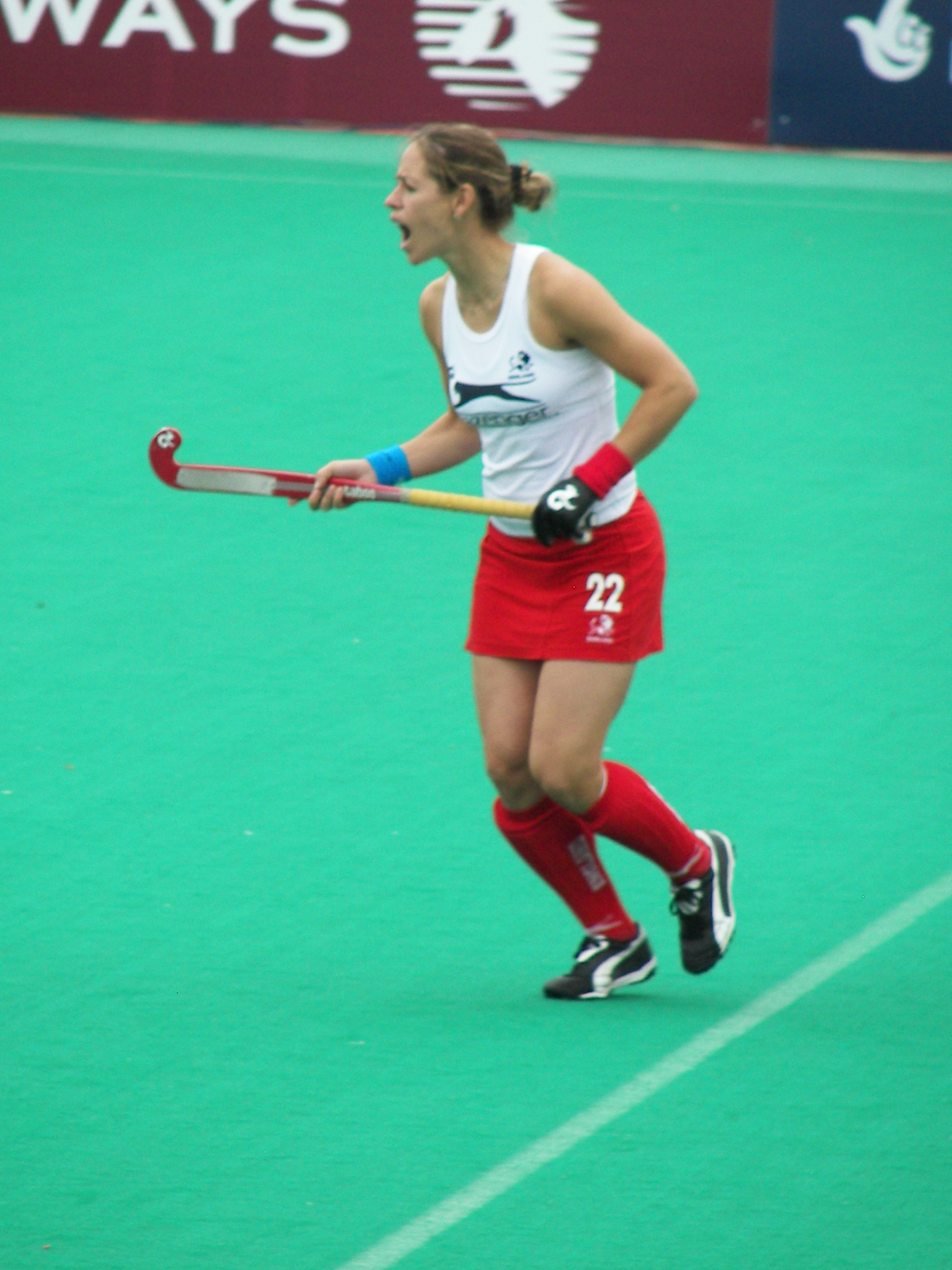

Medal record

Women's field hockey

Representing England

European Championship
Bronze medal – third place	2007 Manchester	Team Competition

Cathy Gilliat-Smith (born 19 March 1981, also known as Cath Nicholson) is an English international field hockey player who played as a forward for England and Great Britain, achieving 64 international caps.

She currently plays club hockey in the Investec Women's Hockey League Premier Division for East Grinstead.

== Personal life ==
Cathy Gilliat-Smith was born in Sevenoaks, Kent and attended Tonbridge Grammar School between 1992 and 2000, after which she attended Loughborough University, graduating with a degree in sports science in 2004.

In November 2011 she gave birth to twins, a boy and a girl. She returned to playing hockey about four months later, in early 2012, playing for Sevenoaks Hockey Club in the England Hockey national league.

On 4 July 2015, Gilliat-Smith married her partner of 15 years, Trevor Nicholson.

She is a teacher at Sevenoaks School, Kent. She is Head of Hockey, runs the girls' athletics programme, teaches PE and design, and is assistant to the Housemaster of Johnsons House as well as tutoring the Middle School boys of Johnsons.

== Career ==
Gilliat-Smith was selected for the England Women's U21 squad to play in the Junior Nations Cup in 2002 European Junior (Women) Nations Cup in Jaen, Spain and was a member of the England U21 squad that toured South Africa in early 2001.

She made her senior international debut for England in 2002. With the England team at the Eurohockey Nations Championships she twice won bronze medals – in Dublin in 2005 and in Manchester in 2007. She was in the squad that won a bronze medal in the 2006 Melbourne Commonwealth Games.

She has played for a number of Investec Women's Hockey League clubs including Loughborough Students, Chelsmford, Canterbury and Sevenoaks Hockey Club.

In 2020 Gilliat-Smith made her Stoolball debut for Weald, scoring 95 runs.
