= Lisa Wooding =

English field hockey player

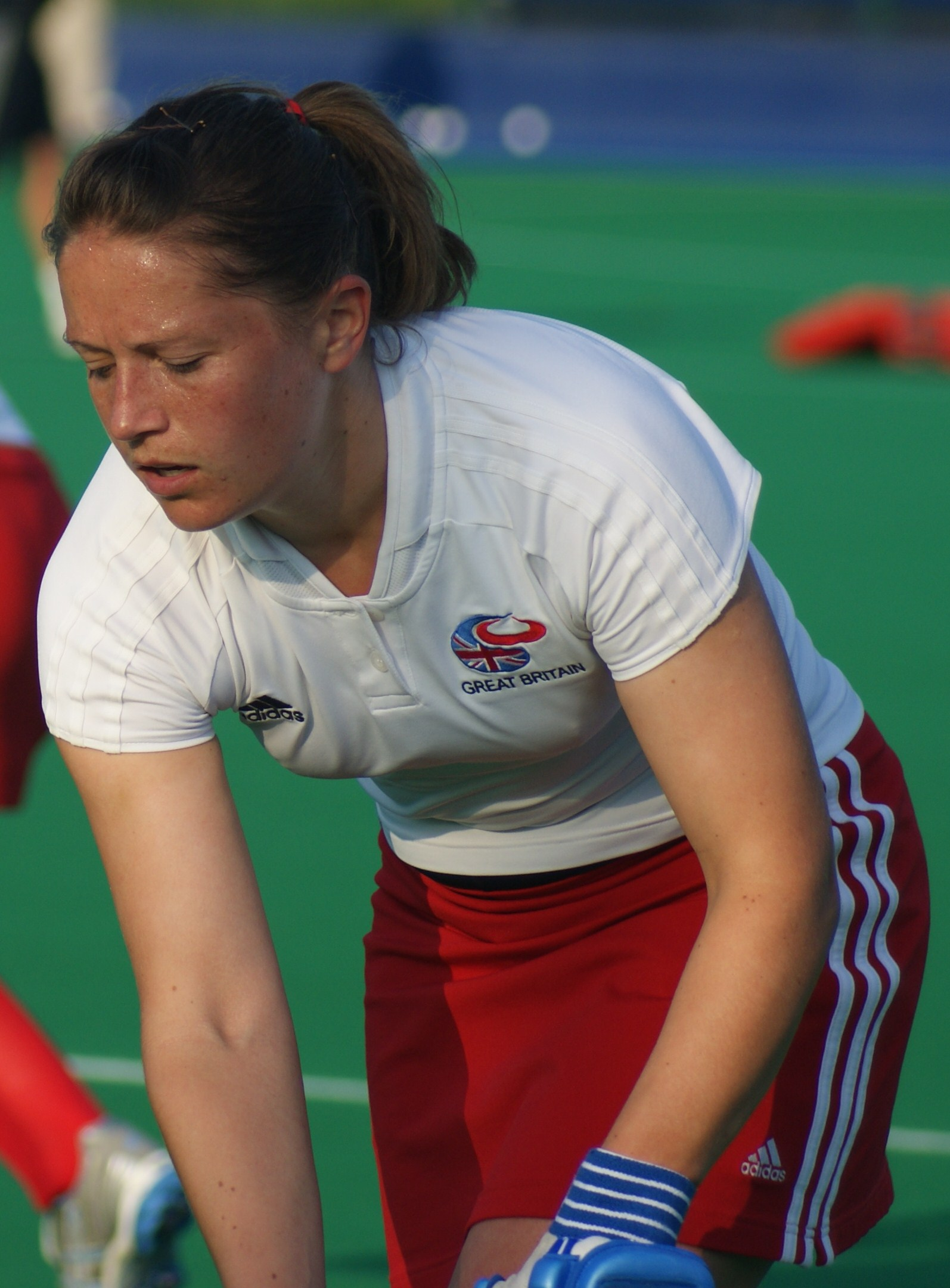

Personal information
- Born: 1 December 1979 (age 46)
Medal record
Women's field hockey
Representing England
European Championship
Bronze medal – third place	2005 Dublin	Team
Commonwealth Games
Bronze medal – third place	2006 Melbourne	Team
Champions Challenge
Gold medal – first place	2002 Johannesburg	Team
Bronze medal – third place	2007 Baku	Team

Lisa Marie Wooding (born 1 December 1979 in Bishop's Stortford, Hertfordshire) is an English field hockey defender, who was a member of the England and Great Britain women's field hockey team since making her England debut in January 2001 against India.
