= Jaimee Provan =

New Zealand field hockey player

Personal information
- Born: 3 February 1978 (age 48)
Medal record
Women's field hockey
Representing New Zealand
Champions Challenge
Gold medal – first place	2005 Virginia Beach	Team

Jaimee Sarah Provan-Claxton (born 3 February 1978) is a field hockey forward from New Zealand, who represented her native country in 2 Olympic Games: the 2004 Summer Olympics in Athens, Greece- here she finished in sixth place with the Women's National Team. She also competed in the 2008 Beijing Olympics. As well as representing NZ at the 2002 Commonwealth Games. Provan made her international senior debut for the Black Sticks in 2001 and retired in 2008 with 145 international test caps. She was born in Christchurch. Since retiring from hockey, Jaimee became a tv personality before moving to Europe with her husband. She now lives in France with their 3 kids. Jaimee launched her own website design & development business in 2019 called Website Restyle

== International senior competitions ==
- 2001 – Champions Trophy, Amstelveen
- 2002 – Champions Trophy, Macau
- 2002 – Commonwealth Games, Manchester
- 2002 – World Cup, Perth
- 2003 – Champions Challenge, Catania
- 2004 – Olympic Qualifying Tournament, Auckland
- 2004 – Olympic Games, Athens
- 2005 – Champions Challenge, Virginia Beach
- 2008 – Olympic Games, Beijing
