= Joanne Ellis =

British field hockey player

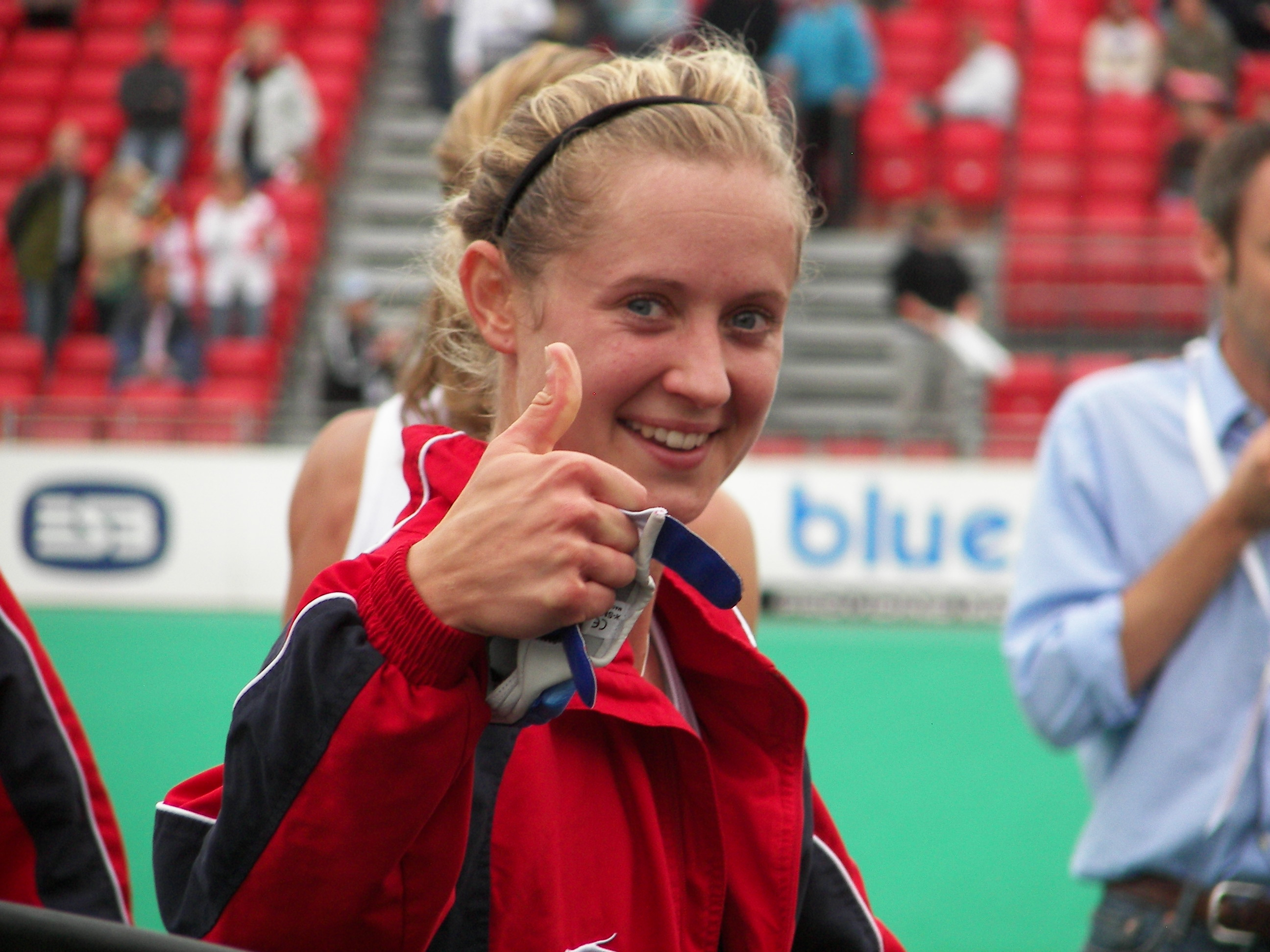

Personal information
- Born: 28 June 1981 (age 45) Cambridge, Cambridgeshire
Medal record
Women's field hockey
Representing England
Commonwealth Games
Silver medal – second place	2002 Manchester	Team
Bronze medal – third place	2006 Melbourne	Team
European Championship
Bronze medal – third place	2007 Manchester	Team
Champions Challenge
Bronze medal – third place	2007 Baku	Team

Joanne Catherine Ellis (born 28 June 1981 in Cambridge, Cambridgeshire) is an English field hockey international, who was a member of the England and Great Britain women's field hockey team since 2002. She is not to be confused with another English field hockey player named Jo Ellis, who was born in 1983. She is now working at the mount school York.
