= April Fronzoni =

American field hockey player

April Fronzoni (born February 18, 1982, in Larksville, Pennsylvania) is a field hockey striker from the United States, who earned her first international senior cap versus Ireland on January 14, 2004, at Stanford, California. Fronzoni attended the University of Michigan in Ann Arbor, where she played for the Wolverines.

Fronzoni has been a mainstay in the U.S. system since competing on the junior national team in the late 1990s, and is prone to scoring decisive goals. She gave the senior national team a 1–0 win over New Zealand in the ATA Holdings Champions' Challenge on a penalty corner goal taken after the expiration of the second half.

== International senior competitions ==
- 2004 – Olympic Qualifying Tournament, Auckland, New Zealand (6th)
- 2004 – Pan American Cup, Bridgetown, Barbados (2nd)
- 2006 – World Cup Qualifier, Rome, Italy (4th)
- 2006 – World Cup, Madrid (6th)
- 2007 – Champions' Challenge, Baku, Azerbaijan
