= Chie Akutsu =

Japanese field hockey player

Personal information
- Born: September 15, 1984 (age 41) Japan
- Height: 1.55 m (5 ft 1 in)

Sport
- Sport: Field hockey
- Position: midfielder
- Club: GlaxoSmithKline
National team
Years	Team	Caps	Goals
2005-	Japan		-
Medal record
Women's field hockey
Representing Japan
Asian Champions Trophy
Bronze medal – third place	2011 Ordos

Chie Akutsu (born 15 September 1984) is a Japanese field hockey player. At the 2012 Summer Olympics she competed with the Japan women's national field hockey team in the women's tournament.
