= Beth Jurgeleit =

New Zealand field hockey player

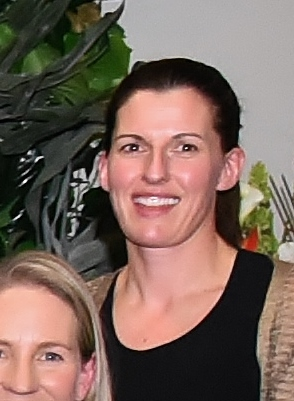
- Jurgeleit (now Smith) in 2018

Personal information
- Born: Beth Ellen Jurgeleit; 24 July 1980 (age 46) Wellington, New Zealand

Sport
- Sport: Field hockey
- Position: Goalkeeper
National team
Years	Team	Caps	Goals
2003–2010	New Zealand	105	(0)
Medal record
Women's field hockey
Representing New Zealand
Commonwealth Games
Silver medal – second place	2010 Delhi	Team competition
Champions Challenge
Gold medal – first place	2005 Virginia Beach	Team
Gold medal – first place	2009 Cape Town	Team

Beth Ellen Jurgeleit (married name Smith; born 24 July 1980) is a New Zealand field hockey goalkeeper, who competed as part of the New Zealand women's national field hockey team (the Black Sticks Women) at the 2004 Summer Olympics and the 2008 Summer Olympics.

Jurgeleit announced her retirement from field hockey in 2011.
