= Kelly Doton =

American field hockey player

Personal information
- Born: February 2, 1982 (age 44) Greenfield, Massachusetts, U.S.

Sport
- Sport: Field hockey
Senior career
Years	Team	Caps	Goals
–	Wake Forest Demon Deacons	-	-
National team
Years	Team	Caps	Goals
–	United States		-

Kelly Doton (born February 2, 1982, in Greenfield, Massachusetts) is a field hockey defender from the United States, who earned her first international cap vs New Zealand on April 14, 2005, in Virginia Beach. Doton, nicknamed Dote, attended Wake Forest University. Doton was named as the Head field hockey coach at Boston College in the Spring of 2015.

Doton was named ACC coach of the year in 2019.

== College ==
In 2004, while at Wake Forest, Doton won the Honda Sports Award as the nation's best field hockey player.

== International senior competitions ==
- 2005 – Champions Challenge, Virginia Beach (5th)
- 2006 – World Cup Qualifier, Rome (4th)
- 2006 – World Cup, Madrid (6th)
- 2007 – Pan American Games, Rio de Janeiro (2nd)
