= Mariette Rix =

South African field hockey player

Mariette Rix (born 8 April 1981) is a South African field hockey player who competed in the 2008 Summer Olympics and 2012 Summer Olympics. Currently, Rix serves as a hockey coach at the Woodbridge School.
