= Marta Prat =

Spanish field hockey player (born 1981)

Personal information
- Full name: Marta Prat Calmet
- Born: 24 July 1981 (age 44); Terrassa, Spain

Marta Prat Calmet (Note: In this Spanish name, the first or paternal surname is Prat and the second or maternal family name is Calmet.) (born 24 July 1981 in Terrassa) is a Spanish field hockey player who competed in the 2004 Summer Olympics.
