= Beth Storry =

English field hockey goalkeeper

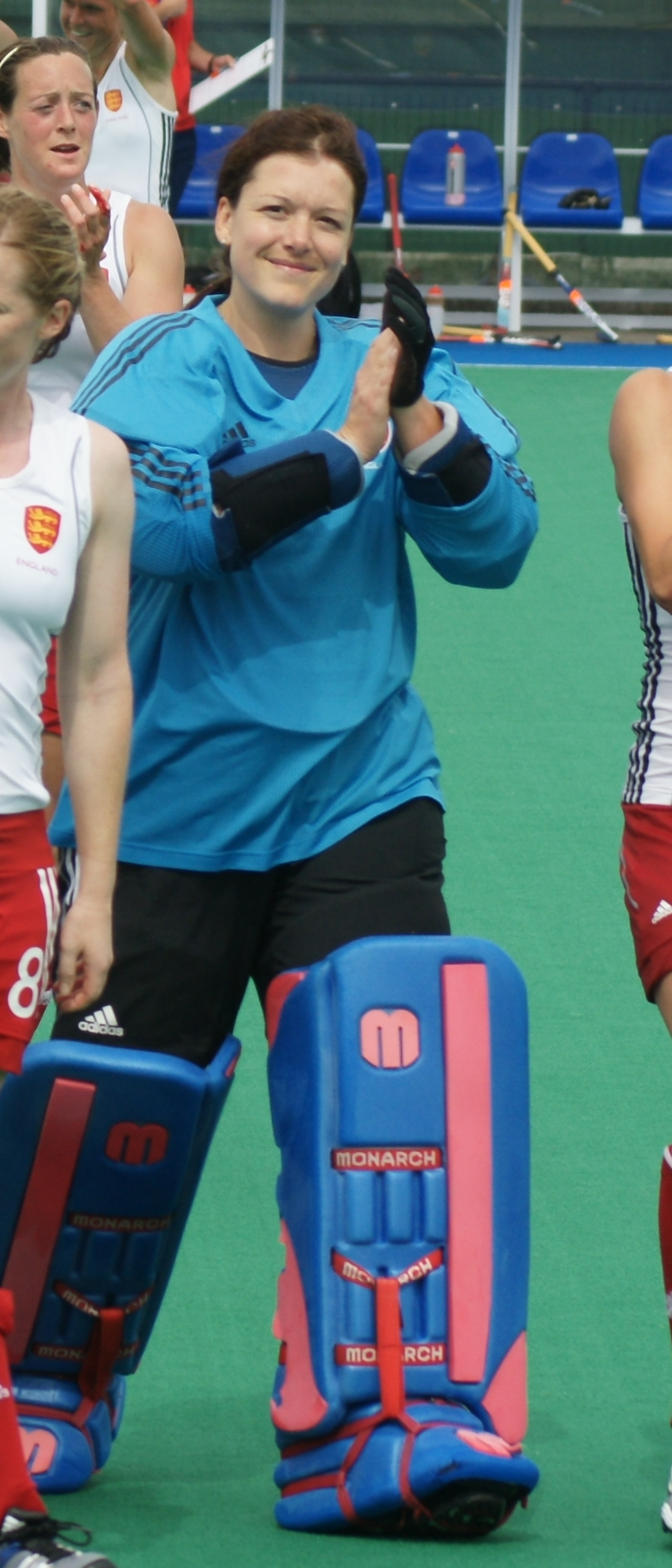
- Storry in 2009

Personal information
- Born: 24 April 1978 (age 48) Reading, Berkshire, England
- Height: 173 cm (5 ft 8 in)
- Weight: 74 kg (163 lb)

Sport
- Sport: Field hockey
- Coached by: Dave Smolenaars
Medal record
Representing United Kingdom
Olympic Games
Bronze medal – third place	2012 London	Team
Champions Trophy
Silver medal – second place	2012 Rosario	Team
Representing England
European Championships
Bronze medal – third place	2007 Manchester	Team
Commonwealth Games
Bronze medal – third place	2006 Melbourne	Team
Champions Challenge
Bronze medal – third place	2007 Baku	Team

Elizabeth Louise "Beth" Storry (born 24 April 1978) is an English field hockey goalkeeper. She was part of the British teams that won the bronze medal at the 2012 Olympics and placed sixth in 2008.

Storry is lesbian. She lives with her partner in Utrecht and works as a business manager with Nike, Inc. She is an accomplished baker, and in 2014 appeared in the Dutch version of The Great British Bake Off TV show, Heel Holland Bakt.
