= Sarah Garnett =

New Zealand field hockey umpire

Sarah Garnett is an International Field Hockey Umpire, from New Zealand. She umpires for Tauranga and is currently on the elite FIH World Panel for umpires. Garnett was named New Zealand's Female Umpire of the Year for 2006. She umpired in the 2006 Commonwealth Games hockey tournament, and was appointed to officiate in the final at the 2006 Women's Hockey World Cup Final, held in Madrid, Spain. Sarah Garnett was also chosen to umpire the women's hockey at the 2008 Summer Olympics in Beijing, China.
