= Jennie Bimson =

British field hockey player (born 1976)

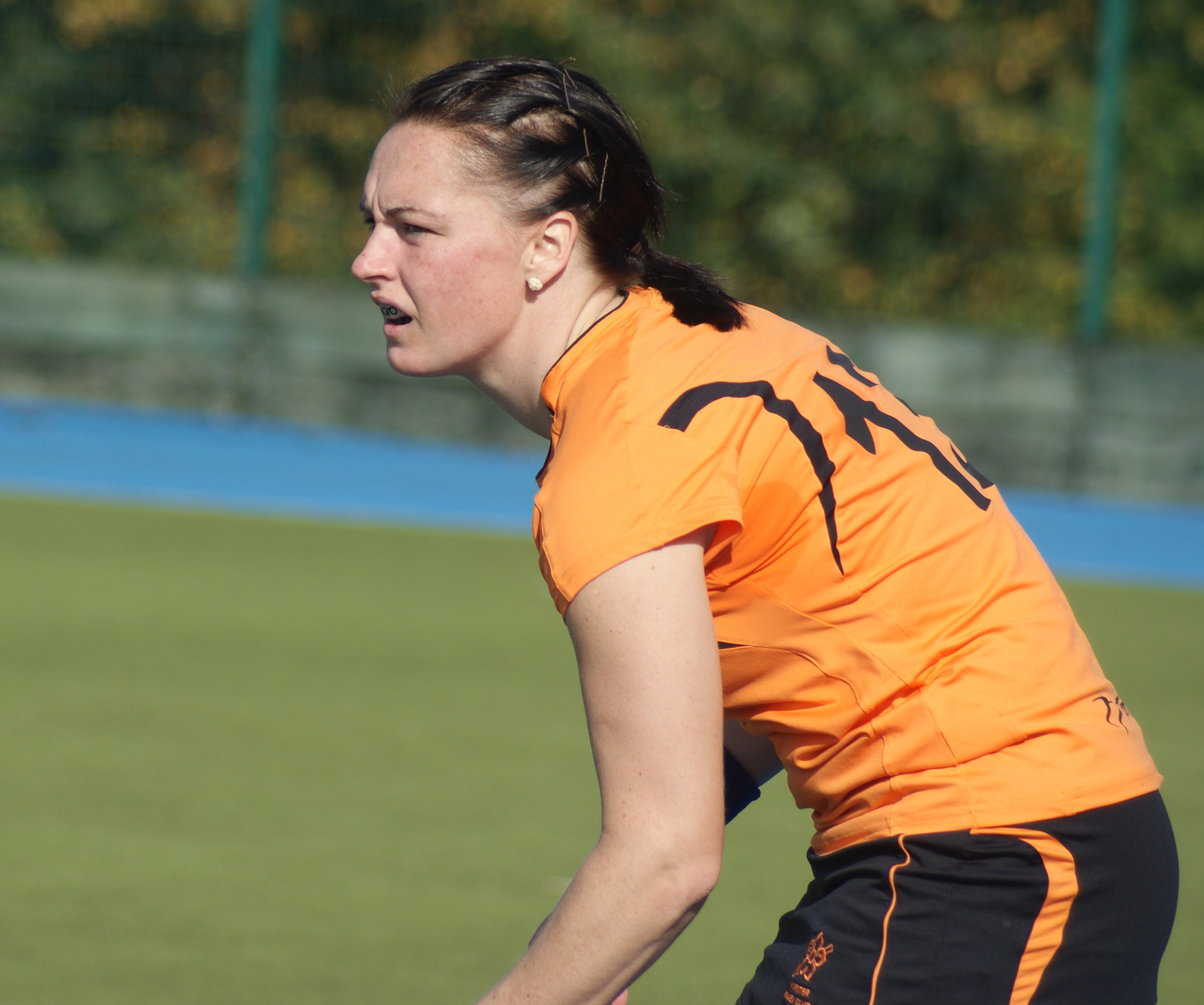

Personal information
- Nationality: English
- Born: 13 October 1976 (age 49) Wordsley, West Midlands, England

Sport
- Sport: Field hockey
Medal record
field hockey
Representing England
European Championship
Bronze medal – third place	2003 Barcelona	Team
Bronze medal – third place	2005 Dublin	Team
Bronze medal – third place	2007 Manchester	Team
Commonwealth Games
Silver medal – second place	1998 Kuala Lumpur	Team
Silver medal – second place	2002 Manchester	Team
Bronze medal – third place	2006 Melbourne	Team
Champions Challenge
Gold medal – first place	2002 Johannesburg	Team
Bronze medal – third place	2007 Baku	Team

Jennie "Bimmo" Bimson (born 13 October 1976 in Wordsley, West Midlands) is a retired English field hockey player. A former member of the England and Great Britain women's field hockey team during the late 1990s and 2000s, she played in midfield and as a forward.

She retired from hockey after the 2008 Olympics.
