= Kim Noakes =

New Zealand field hockey player

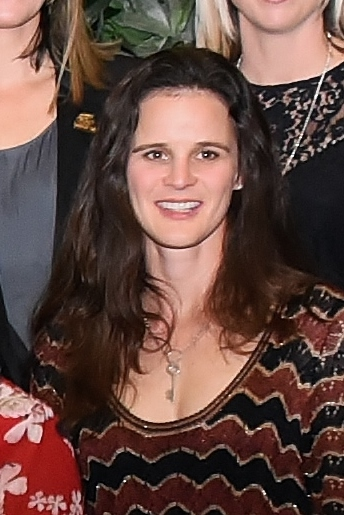
- Noakes (now Archibald) in 2018

Personal information
- Born: Kimberley Noakes; 3 October 1982 (age 43) Auckland, New Zealand
- Field hockey career
- Height: 1.70 m (5 ft 7 in)
- Weight: 57 kg (126 lb)
- Sport: Field hockey
National team
Years	Team	Caps	Goals
–	New Zealand		-
Medal record
Women's field hockey

Kimberley Noakes (now Archibald; born 3 October 1982) is a New Zealand field hockey player who competed in the 2008 Summer Olympics. Noakes was born in Auckland.
