= Amy Swensen =

American field hockey player

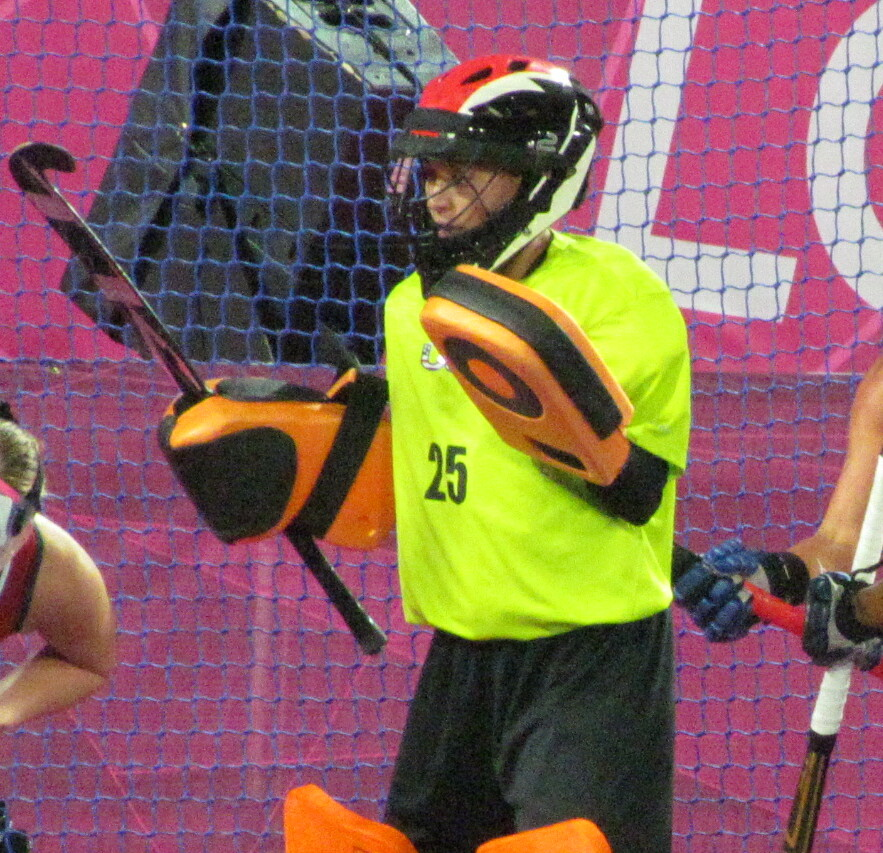

Personal information
- Born: Amy Trần; 2 October 1980 (age 45) Harrisburg, Pennsylvania

Sport
- Sport: Field hockey
National team
Years	Team	Caps	Goals
2006-2012	USA	163	-
Medal record
Women's field hockey
Representing United States
Pan American Games
Gold medal – first place	2011 Guadalajara	Team

Amy Swensen (née Trần, also known as Amy Tran-Swensen, born October 2, 1980) is an American field hockey player. A goalkeeper, she made her national team debut against Mexico at the 2001 Pan American Cup, where she shared the 5–0 shutout. She was born in Harrisburg, Pennsylvania, and began playing hockey at the age of 13. Tran attended the Northern Lebanon High School and University of North Carolina. At the 2006 Women's Hockey World Cup, Tran was named Goalkeeper of the Tournament.

At the 2008 and 2012 Summer Olympics, she competed for the United States women's national field hockey team in the women's event. She regained her position in the team after knee replacement surgery in autumn 2011. After the US's failure to qualify for the 2010 World Cup, she briefly quit hockey to concentrate on her career in massage therapy, also taking the time to marry her husband, Mark Swensen.

She announced her retirement from Team USA in January 2013, having played in 163 games.

== International senior competitions ==
- 2002 – USA vs India WC Qualifying Series, Cannock (1st)
- 2003 – Champions Challenge, Catania (5th)
- 2003 – Pan American Games, Santo Domingo (2nd)
- 2004 – Pan American Cup, Bridgetown (2nd)
- 2004 – Olympic Qualifying Tournament, Auckland (6th)
- 2005 – Champions Challenge, Virginia Beach (5th)
- 2006 – World Cup Qualifier, Rome (4th)
- 2006 – World Cup, Madrid (6th)
