= Meredith Orr =

New Zealand field hockey player

Medal record

Women's field hockey

Representing New Zealand

Meredith Dawn Orr (born 2 May 1978 in Whakatāne) is a field hockey midfielder from New Zealand, who represented her native country at the 2004 Summer Olympics in Athens, Greece. There she finished in sixth place with the Women's National Team. Orr made her international senior debut for the Black Sticks in 2001 against Korea in Wellington.

Orr attended Diocesan School for Girls in Auckland and then attended Massey University to complete her business degree. In 2006 Orr ruptured her ACL but returned to hockey seven months later to Captain the Canterbury Cats hockey team in the New Zealand Hockey League. In a continual effort to keep developing her game, Orr played for the NSW Arrows team in the 2007 Australian Hockey League.

Orr has over 110 caps for New Zealand. She was in the Black Sticks side which won the Oceania Cup in Queensland, Australia in September 2007 beating Australia in the final to qualify for the Beijing Olympics. She was included in the squad from which the team to represent New Zealand at the 2008 Olympic Games in Beijing was chosen.

== International Competitions ==
- 2001 – Champions Trophy, Amstelveen
- 2003 – Champions Challenge, Catania
- 2004 – Olympic Qualifier, Auckland
- 2004 – Olympic Games, Athens
- 2004 – Champions Trophy, Rosario
- 2005 – Champions Challenge, Virginia Beach
