= Jo Galletly =

New Zealand field hockey player

Jo Galletly (born 18 July 1979) is a New Zealand field hockey player who competed in the 2008 Summer Olympics.
