= Silvia Bonastre =

Spanish field hockey player (born 1981)

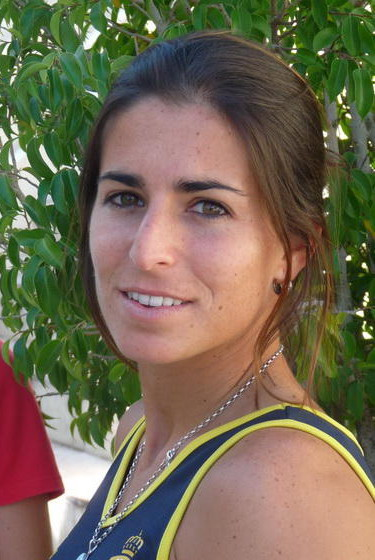
- Bonastre in 2011

Personal information
- Born: 29 November 1981 (age 44)
Medal record
Women's field hockey
Representing Spain
Champions Challenge
Silver medal – second place	2003 Catania	Team Competition

Silvia Bonastre Peremateu (born 29 November 1981 in Terrassa, Catalonia) is a field hockey midfield player from Spain, who represented her native country at the 2004 Summer Olympics in Athens, Greece and at the 2008 Summer Olympics in Beijing. She was also a member of the Spain national team that finished fourth at the 2006 Women's Hockey World Cup in Madrid, under the guidance of head coach Pablo Usoz. Her sister, Berta Bonastre, still plays for the National Team.
