= Misaki Ozawa =

Japanese field hockey player

Medal record

Women's field hockey

Representing Japan

Asian Games
Silver medal – second place	2006 Doha	Team competition

Misaki Ozawa (born 8 August 1985) is a Japanese former field hockey player who competed in the 2008 Summer Olympics.
