= Julia Menéndez =

Spanish field hockey player (born 1985)

Julia Menéndez Ortega (born August 1, 1985 in Barcelona) is a field hockey defender from Spain. She represented her native country at the 2008 Summer Olympics in Beijing, PR China. She is affiliated with FC Junior Barcelona.
