= María López =

Spanish field hockey player (born 1984)

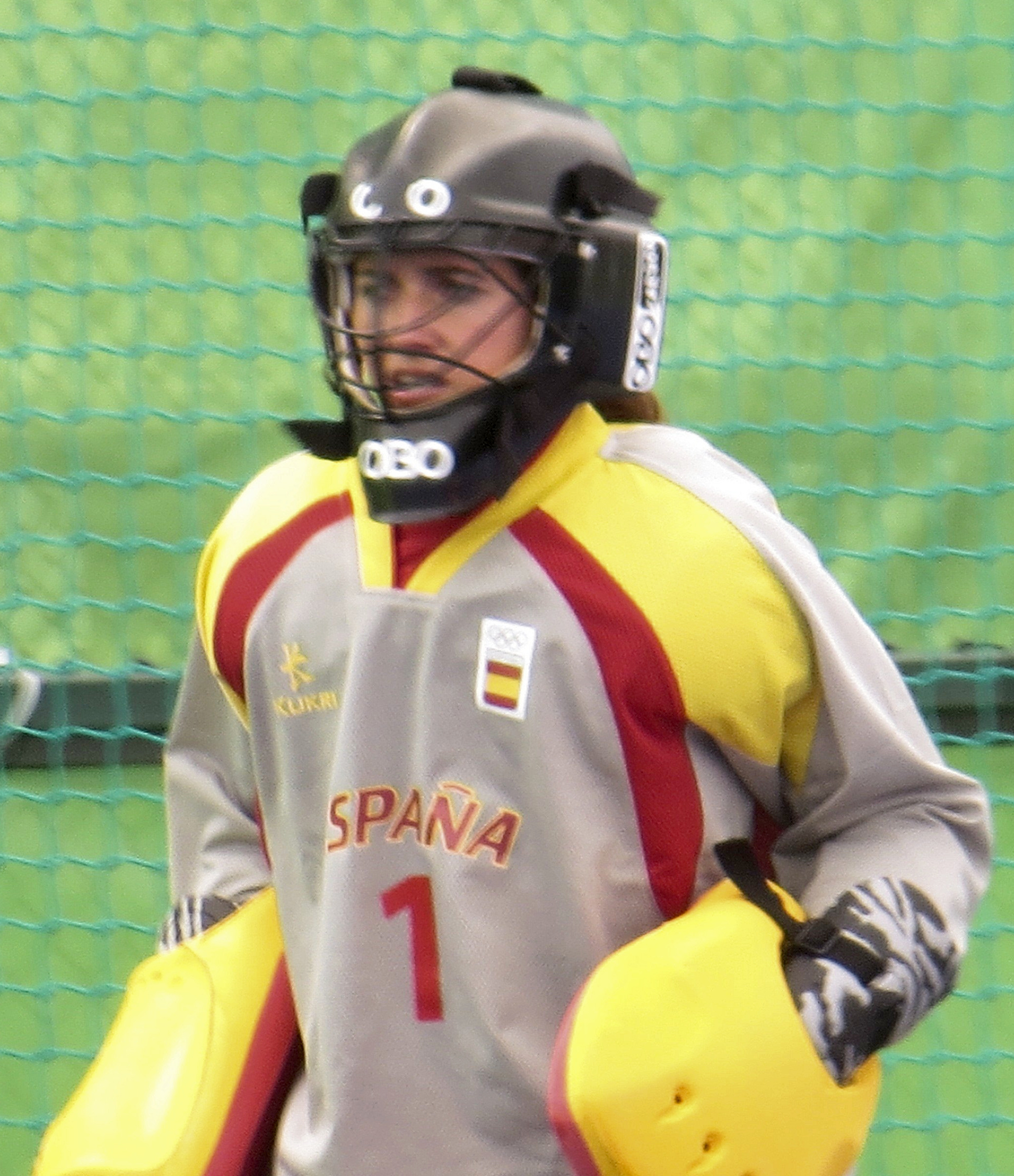
- López at the 2016 Olympics

Personal information
- Full name: María López de Eguilaz Zubiria
- Born: 12 July 1995 (age 31) Getxo, Spain
- Height: 1.64 m (5 ft 5 in)
- Weight: 56 kg (123 lb)

Sport
- Sport: Field hockey
- Position: Goalkeeper
- Club: SV Kampong
National team
Years	Team	Caps	Goals
–	Spain	161	(0)
Medal record
World Cup
Bronze medal – third place	2018 London

María López de Eguilaz Zubiria (born 12 July 1984) is a Spanish field hockey goalkeeper who competed at the 2008 and 2016 Summer Olympics.

López took up field hockey aged eight, and became a goalkeeper at ten. She was included to the national team in 2005, and in 2015 named Best Goalkeeper of the Spanish Division de Honor. She coached goalkeepers at Real Club Josaleta.
