= Fiona Butler =

South African field hockey player

Medal record

Representing South Africa

All Africa Games
Gold medal – first place	2003 Abuja, Nigeria	

Fiona Butler (born 16 October 1977) is a South African former field hockey player who competed in the 2004 Summer Olympics and in the 2008 Summer Olympics.
