= María Jesús Rosa (field hockey) =

Spanish field hockey player (born 1979)

Personal information
- Born: 11 November 1979 (age 46)
Medal record
Women's field hockey
Champions Challenge
Silver medal – second place	2003 Catania	Team Competition

María Jesús Rosa Durán (born 11 November 1979 in Madrid) also known as Chus Rosa, is a field hockey goalkeeper from Spain, who represented her native country in two Summer Olympic Games (2004 in Athens, Greece and 2008 in Beijing, China). Rosa grew up and developed her skills in Colegio Valdeluz, a strong quarry of field hockey players in Madrid such as Ignacio Cobos and Rodrigo Garza among others. Rosa was a key member of the Spanish national team that finished fourth at the 2006 Women's Hockey World Cup in Madrid. She was named in the FIH ALL STAR in 2006, 2007 and 2008.
