= Kate Saunders (field hockey) =

New Zealand field hockey player

Kate Saunders (born 6 May 1982) is a New Zealand field hockey player who competed in the 2008 Summer Olympics.

Since 2019, she has been the coach of the Melbourne University Hockey Club top women's team, who were promoted to the Victorian Premier League in 2019.
