= Marta Ejarque =

Spanish field hockey player (born 1986)

Marta Ejarque Guillamat (born 7 June 1986 in Terrassa) is a Spanish field hockey player who competed in the 2008 Summer Olympics.
