= Rachel Walker (field hockey) =

English field hockey player

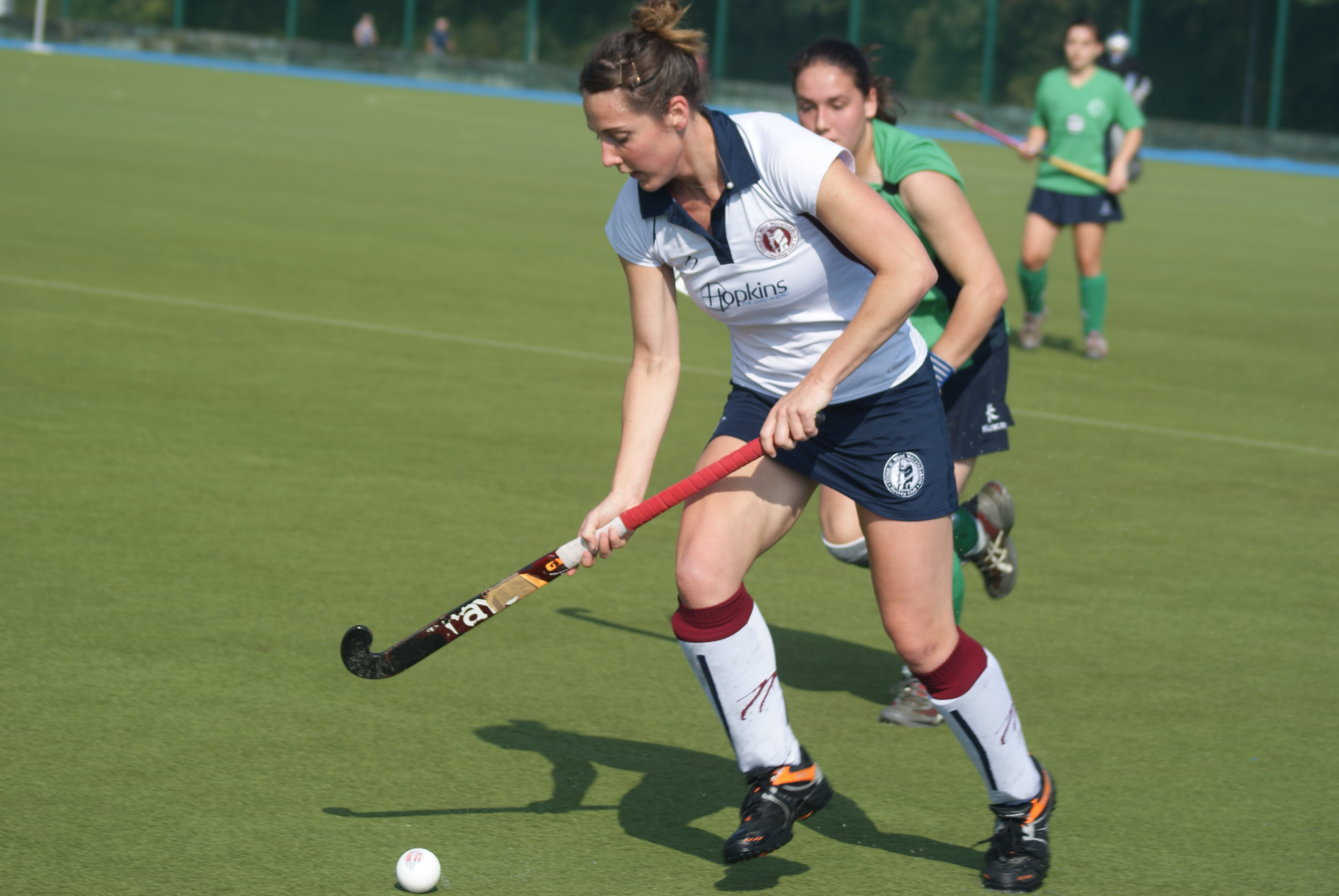
- Rachel Walker in 2008

Medal record

Women's field hockey

Representing England

European Championship
Bronze medal – third place	2003 Barcelona	Team
Bronze medal – third place	2005 Dublin	Team
Bronze medal – third place	2007 Manchester	Team

Commonwealth Games
Silver medal – second place	2002 Manchester	Team

Champions Challenge
Bronze medal – third place	2007 Baku	Team

Rachel Walker (born 15 May 1979) is an English field hockey international, who was a member of the England and Great Britain women's field hockey team since making her England debut in June 2000 against Ireland. She is nicknamed Wacker. She graduated from Birmingham University in Physiotherapy in 2000.
