= Danny Kerry (field hockey) =

English field hockey coach (born 1970)

Danny Kerry MBE
Personal information
- Nationality: English
- Born: 2 December 1970 (age 55) King's Lynn, Norfolk, England

Sport
- Country: Great Britain; England
- Sport: Field hockey
- Team: England; Great Britain (coach)

Danny Kerry MBE (born 2 December 1970) is an English international field hockey coach. He was the head coach for the England and Great Britain Men's teams from September 2018 until January 2022. He had previously been Head Coach for the England and Great Britain Women's teams from 2005 to 2012 and 2014 to 2018. During this tenure the national teams medalled at Commonwealth, European, World and Olympic level. Kerry was voted Team GB coach of the year in 2016 following the Rio Olympic Games, and awarded the Sam Musabini medal by UK Coaching.

Kerry was appointed Member of the Order of the British Empire (MBE) for services to Women's Hockey in the 2017 Birthday Honours.

He was born in King's Lynn, Norfolk and was educated at the town's King Edward VII School. He subsequently studied at Loughborough University and the University of Warwick, and holds Honorary Doctorates from both Loughborough & Roehampton University.

== Career ==
He was first appointed head coach of the Great Britain women's national field hockey team on 1 January 2005, and continued to the 2012 Summer Olympics. Following London 2012 he was appointed Performance Director for England & GB Hockey to the end of the Rio Olympic cycle.From 2014 to the Rio Olympic Games he held both the Women’s National Head Coach and Performance Director roles.

In August 2018 he was appointed head coach of the England and Great Britain Men’s Hockey teams on a permanent basis through to the Tokyo Olympic Games in 2020.

== Coaching approach ==
Kerry made changes to his coaching following feedback after his role as head coach at the 2008 Olympics.

He emphasises that 'culture precedes performance' and the importance of common purpose. He encourages his players to consider scenarios and to work out for themselves how to 'find a way' in game situations.
