= Tiffany Snow =

American field hockey player

Personal information
- Born: December 2, 1981 (age 44) Escondido, California, United States

Sport
- Sport: Field hockey
- College team: Old Dominion

Tiffany Snow (born December 2, 1981) is an American field hockey player. She competed in the women's tournament at the 2008 Summer Olympics.

== College ==
In 2004, while at Old Dominion, Snow won the Honda Award (now the Honda Sports Award) as the nation's best field hockey player.
