= Esther Termens =

Spanish field hockey player (born 1984)

Personal information
- Born: 2 November 1984 (age 41)
Medal record
Women's field hockey
Representing Spain
Champions Challenge
Silver medal – second place	2003 Catania	Team competition

Esther Termens Cañabate (born 2 November 1984 in Terrassa, Catalonia) is a field hockey midfield player from Spain. She represented her native country at the 2004 Summer Olympics in Athens, Greece. Termens was a key member of the Spanish national team that finished fourth at the 2006 Women's Hockey World Cup in Madrid and of the 2003 Champions Challenge runners-up squad.
