= Dina Rizzo =

American field hockey player

Personal information
- Born: March 24, 1980 (age 46) Boston, Massachusetts, United States

Sport
- Sport: Field hockey

Dina Rizzo (born March 24, 1980) is an American field hockey player. She competed in the women's tournament at the 2008 Summer Olympics.
