= Akemi Kato =

Japanese field hockey player

Personal information
- Born: December 13, 1970 (age 55) Arakawa, Chichibu District, Saitama Prefecture, Japan
Medal record
Women's field hockey
Representing Japan
Asian Games
Silver medal – second place	2006 Doha	Team
Bronze medal – third place	2002 Busan	Team
Bronze medal – third place	2010 Guangzhou	Team
Asia Cup
Gold medal – first place	2007 Hong Kong	Team
Asian Champions Trophy
Silver medal – second place	2010 Busan

Akemi Kato (加藤 明美, Katō Akemi; born December 13, 1970) is a retired female field hockey player from Japan. She represented her country at the Summer Olympics three times, in 2004, 2008 and 2012.

Kato was a leading scorer for the Japanese team at the 1993 Intercontinental Cup competition in the United States. She also scored for the Japanese team in qualifying matches for the 2000 Olympics. She was the oldest participant (33 years, 245 days) in the Japanese Women's Squad at the 2004 Summer Olympics in Athens, Greece. She captained the national side since 2005.
