= Lenise Marais =

South African field hockey player

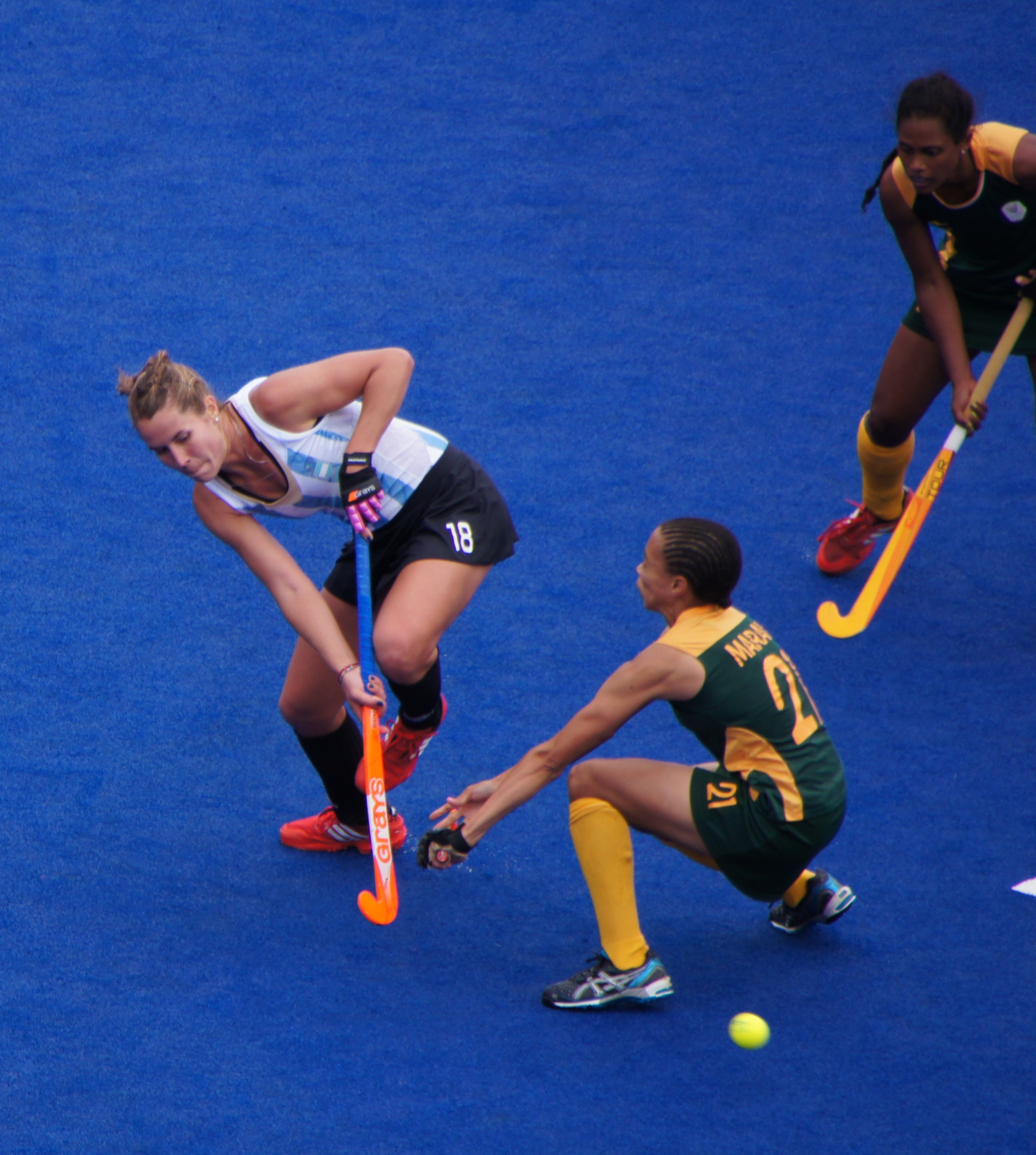

Personal information
- Born: 29 April 1985 (age 41)
- Height: 159 cm (5 ft 3 in)
- Weight: 52 kg (115 lb)

Sport
- Sport: Field hockey
National team
| Years | Team | Caps | Goals |
| 2005 | South Africa U21 | 8 | - |
| 2006-2014 | South Africa | 232 | - |
Coaching career
- Years: Team
- 2021-present: South African U21

Lenise Marais (born 29 April 1985) is a South African field hockey player who competed in the 2008 and 2012 Summer Olympics. She coached the South African under-21 national team at the 2021 Junior World Cup.
