= Anita Wawatai =

New Zealand field hockey player

Personal information
- Born: 7 December 1980 (age 45) New Zealand

Sport
- Sport: Field hockey
- Position: Goalkeeper
National team
Years	Team	Caps	Goals
2006 2008	2006 Commonwealth Games; 2008 Summer Olympics		-

Anita Wawatai (born 7 December 1980) is a New Zealand field hockey player who competed in the 2006 Commonwealth Games and the 2008 Summer Olympics.
