= Tarryn Bright =

South African field hockey player

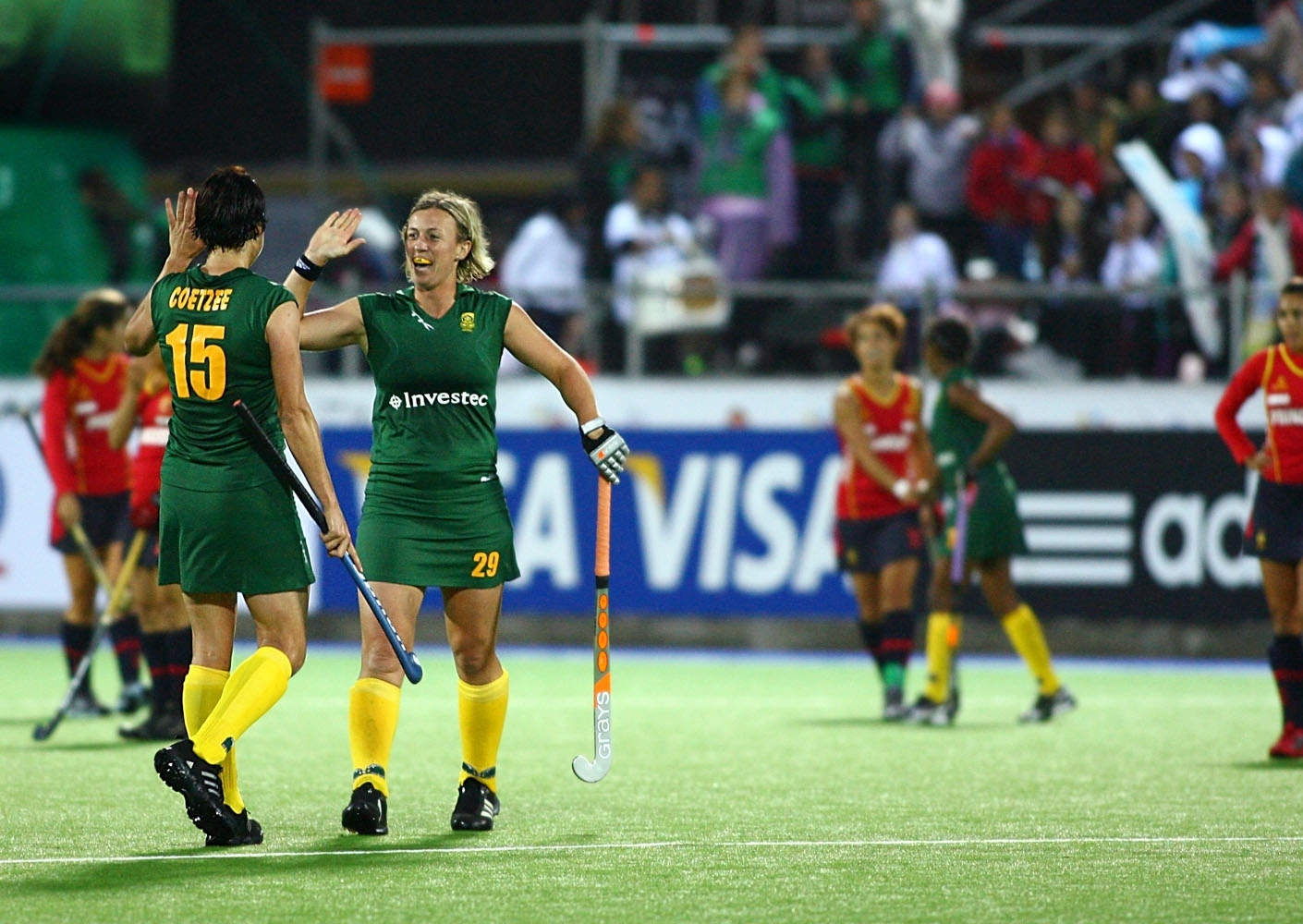
- 2010 Field Hockey World Cup

Personal information
- Born: 26 April 1983 (age 43) Cape Town, Cape Province, South Africa
- Height: 174 cm (5 ft 9 in)
- Weight: 71 kg (157 lb)

Sport
- Sport: Field hockey
National team
Years	Team	Caps	Goals
2006–2015	South Africa	284	(30)
Medal record
Women's field hockey
Representing South Africa
Africa Cup of Nations
Gold medal – first place	2005 Pretoria

Tarryn Bright (born 26 April 1983) is a South African field hockey player who competed in the 2008 and 2012 Summer Olympics. She was named South Africa Hockey Women's player of the year 2007 and 2011 and best Interprovincial Player during a South African hockey carnival in 2014.

During the 2017/18 season, Bright was sidelined from the Suburban Lions Hockey Club (formerly Riverside Lions) due to injury. As a striker for the club's second team, she held a top three position as of round 14. Bright also coaches the Lions men’s masters team, which has made four grand final appearances and won two premierships over the last six years.
