= Taryn Hosking =

South African field hockey player

Taryn Hosking (born 28 June 1981) is a South African field hockey player who competed in the 2008 Summer Olympics.
