= Emily Gaddum =

New Zealand field hockey player

Emily Gaddum MNZM
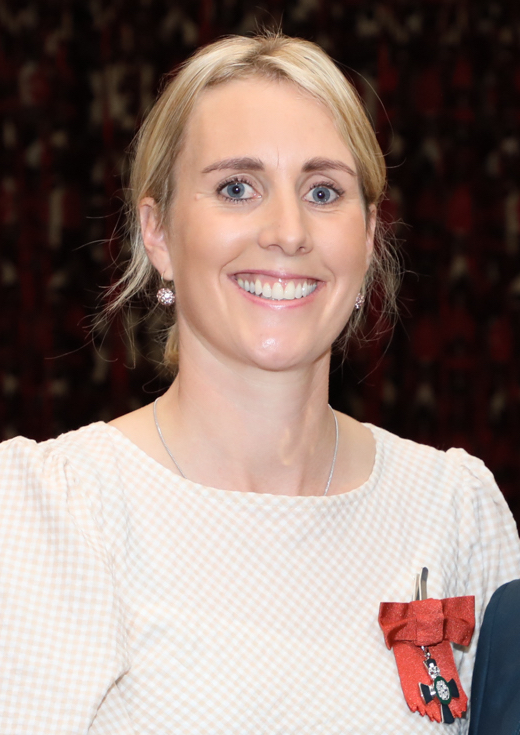
- Gaddum in 2021

Personal information
- Born: Emily Sarah Naylor; 23 December 1985 (age 40) Palmerston North, New Zealand
- Field hockey career
- Height: 1.67 m (5 ft 6 in)
- Sport: Field hockey
- Position: Defence / Midfield
Senior career
Years	Team	Caps	Goals
?–2016	Central	-	-
National team
Years	Team	Caps	Goals
2004–2016	New Zealand	274	(3)
- Updated on 10 July 2016 (national)
Medal record
Women's field hockey
Representing New Zealand
Commonwealth Games
Silver medal – second place	2010 Delhi	Team competition
Bronze medal – third place	2014 Glasgow	Tournament
Champions Trophy
Bronze medal – third place	2011 Amstelveen	Team
Champions Challenge
Gold medal – first place	2005 Virginia Beach	Team
Gold medal – first place	2009 Cape Town	Team

Emily Sarah Gaddum MNZM (née Naylor; born 23 December 1985) is a New Zealand former field hockey player. One of the country's most experienced players, she was due to finish her career after her fourth Olympic appearance at the 2016 Summer Olympics in Rio de Janeiro, but her retirement due to pregnancy was announced when the 2016 Olympic squad was named.

== Early life and family ==
Gaddum was born in 1985 in Palmerston North, New Zealand and attended Palmerston North Intermediate Normal School, and then Palmerston North Girls' High School. She married Harry Gaddum in February 2016.

== Hockey career ==
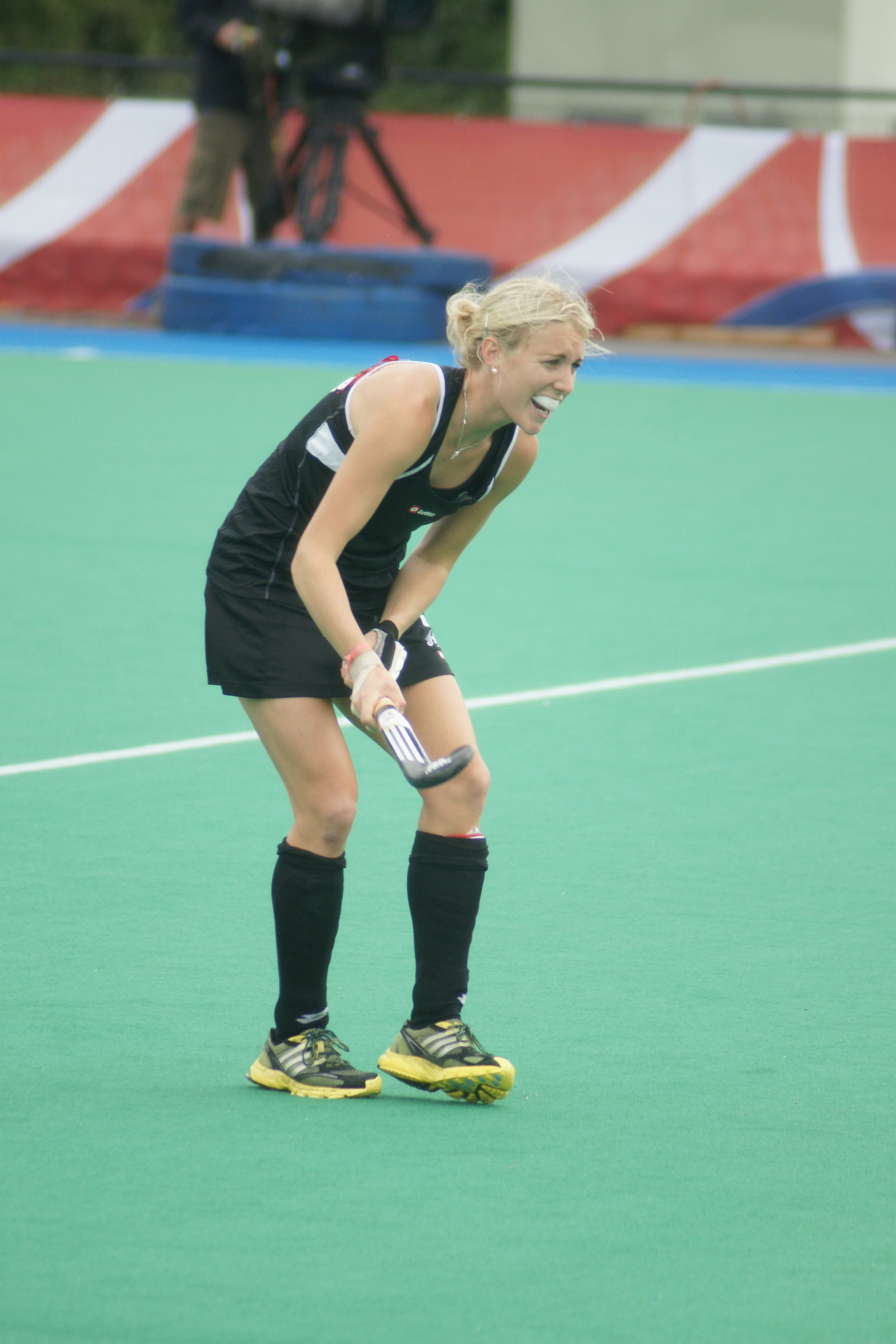
Naylor playing against China in 2009

In 2007, after an outstanding Champions Challenge performance, she was voted Oceania Player of the Century by The ABCD Hockey Magazine. Naylor was also named New Zealand Hockey's Woman Player of the Year in 2009 and 2010.

She was part of the New Zealand team that lost to Great Britain in the bronze medal match at the 2012 Summer Olympics. In April 2014, with 239 international caps, Naylor became the most-capped New Zealand women's hockey player, surpassing the record of Susie Muirhead. She withdrew from the national team in 2015.

Gaddum returned for the tour of Argentina in February and March 2016. She was named in the New Zealand 2016 squad that prepared for the Rio Olympics. For the first time as Emily Gaddum—following her marriage—she was included in the squads for test matches against Canada and against multiple international sides in March and April 2016. Gadddum's retirement was announced with the naming of the final team for the Rio Olympics due to becoming pregnant with her first child. She played a total of 274 for the national team during her career.

== International senior competitions ==
- 2004 – Olympic Qualifying Tournament, Auckland
- 2004 – Olympic Games, Athens
- 2004 – Champions Trophy, Rosario
- 2005 – Champions Challenge, Virginia Beach
- 2006 – Commonwealth Games, Melbourne
- 2006 – World Cup Qualifier, Rome
- 2006 – Champions Trophy, Amstelveen
- 2008 – Olympic Games, Beijing
- 2012 – Olympic Games, London

== Honours and awards ==
In the 2020 Queen's Birthday Honours, Gaddum was appointed a Member of the New Zealand Order of Merit, for services to hockey.
