= Ikuko Okamura =

Japanese field hockey player

Medal record

Women's field hockey

Representing Japan

Asian Games
Silver medal – second place	2006 Doha	Team competition

Ikuko Okamura (岡村 育子, Okamura Ikuko; born 17 September 1976) is a Japanese former field hockey player who competed in the 2008 Summer Olympics.
