= Jennifer Wilson (field hockey) =

South African field hockey player

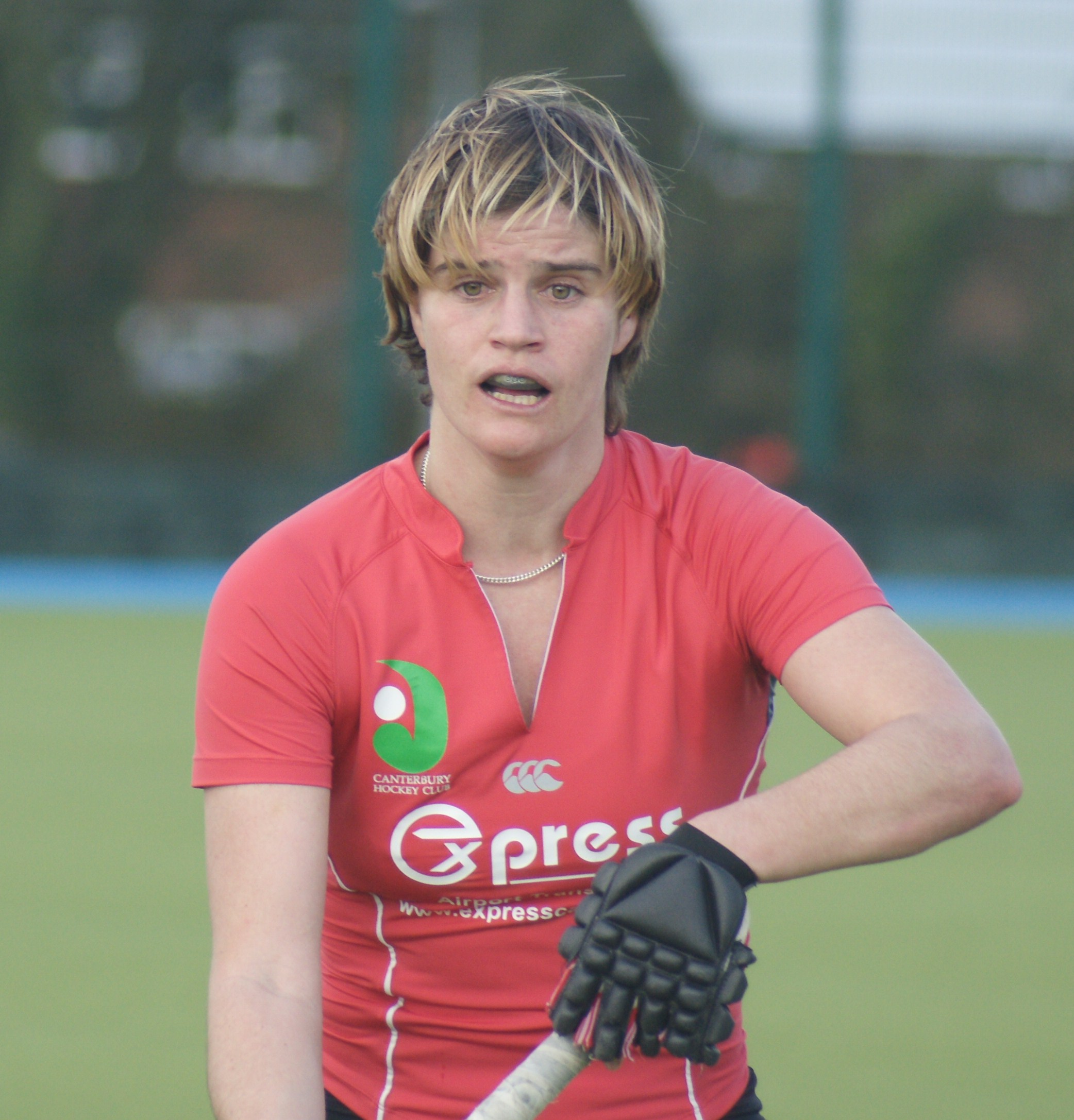

Personal information
- Born: 27 March 1979 (age 47) Harare, Zimbabwe
- Height: 1.64 m (5 ft 5 in)
- Weight: 67 kg (148 lb)

Sport
- Sport: Field hockey
National team
Years	Team	Caps	Goals
-2012	South Africa	28	(11)
Coaching career
- Years: Team
- 2018-2021: Scotland
Medal record
Representing South Africa
All Africa Games
Gold medal – first place	2003 Abuja, Nigeria

Jennifer "Jen" Wilson (born 27 March 1979) is a former South Africa international field hockey player who became a coach after retiring as a player. She was appointed Head Coach for Scotland on a 3-year contract, starting on 1 August 2018.

== Playing career ==
Wilson competed for South Africa at three Olympic Games: the 2004, 2008 and 2012 Summer Olympics. She also competed at three Hockey World Cups and three Commonwealth Games.

== Coaching career ==
In 2015 to 2017 she was assistant coach for Scotland.

She has previously been Head Coach for Ashford Hockey Club Men's 1st XI in the Kent/Sussex and South Premier League and later for Canterbury 1st XI in the Investec Women's Hockey League Premier Division and in the EuroHockey Club Champions Cup (women).

In Season 2019/20 Wilson is Head Coach for Sevenoaks 1st XI in the Investec Women's Hockey League Division One South, in addition to her part-time role as Head Coach for Scotland.
