= Carrie Lingo =

American field hockey player

Personal information
- Born: September 27, 1979 (age 46) Wilmington, Delaware, United States

Sport
- Sport: Field hockey
Medal record
Women's field hockey
Representing the United States
Pan American Games
Silver medal – second place	2003 Santo Domingo	Team competition

Carrie Lingo (born September 27, 1979) is an American field hockey player. She competed in the women's tournament at the 2008 Summer Olympics. She was also a member of the Women's National Team that won the silver medal at the 2003 Pan American Games, in Santo Domingo, Dominican Republic.

She shared a Delaware Sportswriters and Broadcasters Association award with Tyresa Smith, with them both being recognized as Delaware's Outstanding Athlete of 2007.

In 2015 she was inducted into the Delaware Sports Hall of Fame.
