= Lauren Powley =

American field hockey player

Personal information
- Born: March 5, 1984 (age 42) Kingston, Pennsylvania
- Height: 5 ft 7 in (1.70 m)

Sport
- Sport: Field hockey
- Position: Midfield
National team
| Years | Team | Caps | Goals |
| 2005-2008 | Team USA | 37 | - |

Lauren Powley (born March 5, 1984) is an American field hockey player.

== Biography ==
=== Early life and education ===
Lauren Powley was born March 5, 1984, in Kingston, Pennsylvania, to Penelope and Kenneth Powley. She grew up in Mountaintop, Pennsylvania, and graduated from Wyoming Seminary high school in Kingston, Pennsylvania, in 2002.

=== Field hockey career ===
Powley played collegiate field hockey for the Maryland Terrapins. She was co-captain of the team her senior year, which won the NCAA Women's Field Hockey Championship.

She has been a member of the United States women's national field hockey team since 2005 and has 37 international caps. Prior to that, she and played on the junior squads in 2001 (under-18), 2002 (under-19), 2004 and 2005 (under-21). Powley competed in the 2008 Summer Olympic Games in Beijing, China as a member of the United States Field Hockey Team. The team earned a spot in the Olympic games after defeating Belgium in the Olympic Qualifier championship game on April 28, 2008.

In 2006, Powley biked across the United States with her father, Ken, to raise money for the U.S. field hockey team.
