= Honor Carter =

New Zealand field hockey player

Personal information
- Born: 14 July 1982 (age 44) Blenheim, New Zealand
- Height: 1.68 m (5 ft 6 in)

Sport
- Sport: Field hockey
- Position: Striker
Senior career
Years	Team	Caps	Goals
2008–2012	Auckland	-	-
National team
Years	Team	Caps	Goals
2004–2011	New Zealand	68	(28)
Medal record
Women's field hockey
Representing New Zealand
Gold medal – first place	2005 Virginia Beach	Team
- Updated on 16 August 2012 (national)

Honor Louisa Carter (née Dillon, born 14 July 1982 in Blenheim) is a former New Zealand field hockey striker, competing in the Commonwealth Games, World Cup and Champions Trophy. She competed horses in show jumping and won the prestigious New Zealand title of "Pony of the Year" at Karaka in 1997.

She has competed for the New Zealand women's national field hockey team since 2004, including for the team at the 2006 Commonwealth Games in Melbourne, Australia, the 2004 Champions Trophy Tournament in Rosario, Argentina and the 2006 Champions Trophy Tournament in Amstelveen, Netherlands.

Carter was first selected for the Black Sticks Women in November 2004 on the back of her performance for Canterbury in the National Hockey League that year. She played her first match for the Black Sticks on 6 November 2004, against Argentina in Rosario, Argentina, as part of the 2004 Champions Trophy Tournament (top 6 teams in the world).

== International tournaments ==
- 2004 – Champions Trophy, Rosario
- 2005 – Champions Challenge, Virginia Beach
- 2006 – Commonwealth Games, Melbourne
- 2006 – World Cup Qualifier, Rome
- 2006 – Champions Trophy, Amstelveen

== Personal life ==
Born in Blenheim to Maling and James Dillon, Carter spent most of her early life living in Wellington. She has two older sisters: Amber and Michal. Carter attended Chilton Saint James School, before later completing a double degree – Bachelor of Commerce (Marketing) and Bachelor of Science (Psychology) – at the University of Canterbury. Carter is an ambassador for the Chemist Warehouse and SPCA Animal Charity in New Zealand.

Carter became engaged to long-term boyfriend Dan Carter, player of the New Zealand national rugby union team on 9 October 2010. The couple resided in Auckland, where she worked as a Marketing Manager for DB Breweries. The couple married at Timara Lodge, Marlborough on 9 December 2011. They have four sons. Both Honor and Dan Carter have been ambassadors for Chemist Warehouse since 2020. They are also shareholders for Farradays, a luxury department store and bar in Parnell.
