= Lizzy Igasan =

New Zealand field hockey player

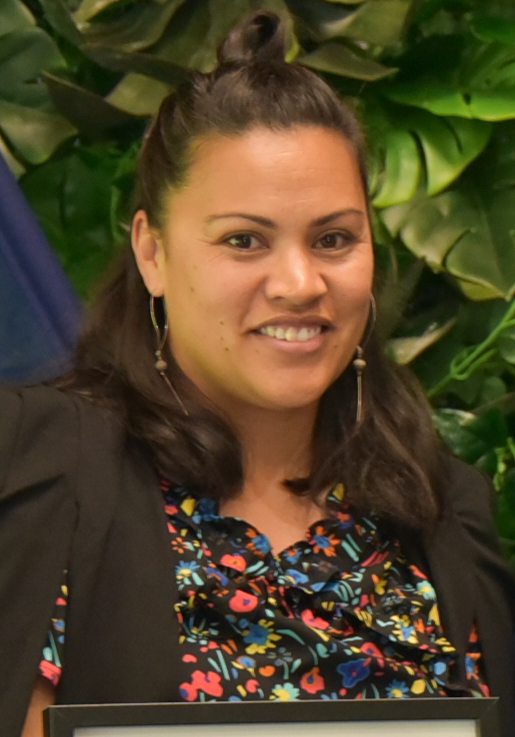
- Igasan (now Horlock) in 2020

Personal information
- Born: Elizabeth Jane Igasan; 16 September 1982 (age 44) Whangārei, New Zealand

Sport
- Sport: Field hockey
- Club: North Harbour

Achievements and titles
- Olympic finals: 2004 and 2008

Elizabeth Jane Igasan (now Horlock; born 16 September 1982) is a New Zealand field hockey player who was captain of the national team and a participant in the 2004 Summer Olympics and 2008 Summer Olympics.

== Early life ==
Igasan was born in Whangārei and attended Whangārei Girls' High School and Rangitoto College. She grew up with her mother, two sisters, Connie and Mary-Anne, and a brother, James. Her parents separated when she was four years' old.

== Field hockey ==
Igasan is a penalty corner specialist and defender, and plays for North Harbour in the New Zealand Hockey League. She played her first game in the New Zealand women's national field hockey team in 2001, and, after playing in the 2004 Summer Olympics and the 2006 Commonwealth Games, but being unavailable for the World Cup qualifying tournament, was chosen as captain of the team for the 2008 Summer Olympics.

She won the New Zealand women's Player of the Year award in 2004, 2005 and 2008.

== Other activities ==
Igasan was a participant in Dancing with the Stars 2009 alongside Geraldine Brophy, Rebecca Hobbs and Barbara Kendall, and partnering Cody Stephens, but was eliminated in week two, the first contestant of the season to be eliminated.
