= Caryn Paewai =

New Zealand field hockey player

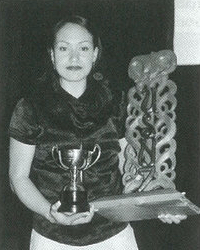
Paewai in 2002

Caryn Erena Paewai (born 27 August 1975) is a former field hockey player from New Zealand, who finished in sixth position with the Women's National Team, nicknamed Black Sticks, at the 2000 Summer Olympics in Sydney, Australia. Two years later she was a member of the side that finished fourth at the 2002 Commonwealth Games in Manchester. She was born in Dannevirke.

Paewai earned a Graduate Diploma of Business Studies at Massey University. In 2002, she was named Māori Sportsperson of the Year at University Sport New Zealand's annual blues dinner.
