= Field hockey at the 2004 Summer Olympics – Women's team squads =

Twelve national teams competed in the women's Olympic field hockey tournament at the 2004 Summer Olympics in Athens. Sixteen players were officially enrolled in each squad.

== Pool A ==
=== Argentina ===
The following is the Argentine roster in the women's field hockey tournament of the 2004 Summer Olympics.

Head coach: Sergio Vigil

1. Mariela Antoniska (GK)
3. Magdalena Aicega (c)
5. Marina di Giacomo
6. Ayelén Stepnik
7. Alejandra Gulla
8. Luciana Aymar
9. Vanina Oneto
10. Soledad García
12. Mariana González Oliva
14. Mercedes Margalot
15. María de la Paz Hernández
16. Cecilia Rognoni
18. Paola Vukojicic (GK)
19. Mariné Russo
21. Inés Arrondo
24. Claudia Burkart

=== China ===
The following is the Chinese roster in the women's field hockey tournament of the 2004 Summer Olympics.

Head coach: Kim Chang-back

1. Nie Yali (GK)
3. Chen Zhaoxia (C)
4. Ma Yibo
5. Cheng Hui
6. Mai Shaoyan
7. Huang Junxia
8. Fu Baorong
9. Li Shuang
10. Gao Lihua
11. Tang Chunling
12. Zhou Wanfeng
15. Hou Xiaolan
16. Zhang Yimeng (GK)
17. Qiu Yingling
19. Chen Qiuqi
26. Chen Qunqing

=== Japan ===
The following is the Japanese roster in the women's field hockey tournament of the 2004 Summer Olympics.

Head coach: Kazunori Kobayashi

1. Rie Terazono (GK)
2. Keiko Miura (C)
3. Akemi Kato
4. Yukari Yamamoto
5. Sachimi Iwao
6. Chie Kimura
7. Rika Komazawa
8. Sakae Morimoto
9. Kaori Chiba
10. Naoko Saito
11. Tomomi Komori
12. Nami Miyazaki (GK)
13. Akiko Kitada
14. Rika Ishida
15. Emi Sakurai
16. Miyuki Nakagawa

=== New Zealand ===
The following is the New Zealand roster in the women's field hockey tournament of the 2004 Summer Olympics.

Head coach: Ian Rutledge

1. Kayla Sharland
2. Emily Naylor
5. Rachel Sutherland
6. Meredith Orr
8. Jaimee Provan
9. Leisen Jobe
10. Lizzy Igasan
11. Stacey Carr
12. Lisa Walton
14. Suzie Muirhead (C)
15. Beth Jurgeleit (GK)
16. Helen Clarke (GK)
18. Diana Weavers
21. Niniwa Roberts
22. Rachel Robertson
23. Tara Drysdale

=== Spain ===
The following is the Spanish roster in the women's field hockey tournament of the 2004 Summer Olympics.

Head coach: Pablo Usoz

1. María Jesús Rosa (GK)
3. Rocío Ybarra
4. Bárbara Malda
5. Mónica Rueda
6. Silvia Bonastre
7. María del Carmen Martín
8. Marta Prat
9. Silvia Muñoz
10. Lucía López
11. María del Mar Feito
12. Maider Tellería
15. Erdoitza Goikoetxea
17. Núria Camón
18. Ana Pérez
19. Maider Luengo
21. Esther Termens

== Pool B ==
=== Australia ===
The following is the Australian roster in the women's field hockey tournament of the 2004 Summer Olympics.

Head coach: David Bell

1. Toni Cronk (GK)
2. Louise Dobson
3. Karen Smith
7. Peta Gallagher
10. Bianca Netzler
11. Emily Halliday
14. Nicole Arrold
17. Rachel Imison (GK)
20. Carmel Bakurski
22. Katie Allen
24. Angie Skirving
25. Melanie Twitt
27. Suzie Faulkner
28. Julie Towers
31. Katrina Powell (C)
32. Nikki Hudson

=== Germany ===
The following is the German roster in the women's field hockey tournament of the 2004 Summer Olympics.

Head coach: Markus Weise

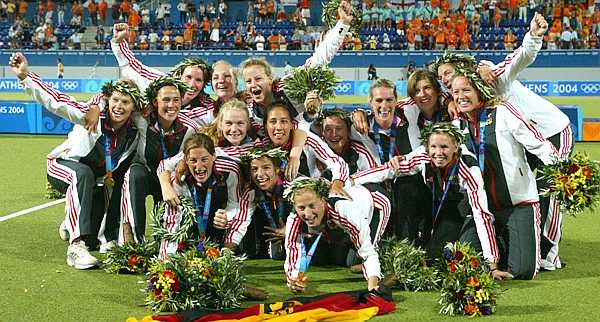
Germany wins gold in women's field hockey.

2. Tina Bachmann
3. Denise Klecker
4. Mandy Haase
5. Nadine Ernsting-Krienke
6. Caroline Casaretto
7. Natascha Keller
10. Silke Müller
13. Marion Rodewald (C)
15. Heike Lätzsch
16. Fanny Rinne
17. Louisa Walter (GK)
18. Anke Kühn
21. Badri Latif
23. Julia Zwehl (GK)
27. Sonja Lehmann
32. Franziska Gude

=== Netherlands ===
The following is the Dutch roster in the women's field hockey tournament of the 2004 Summer Olympics.

Head coach: Marc Lammers

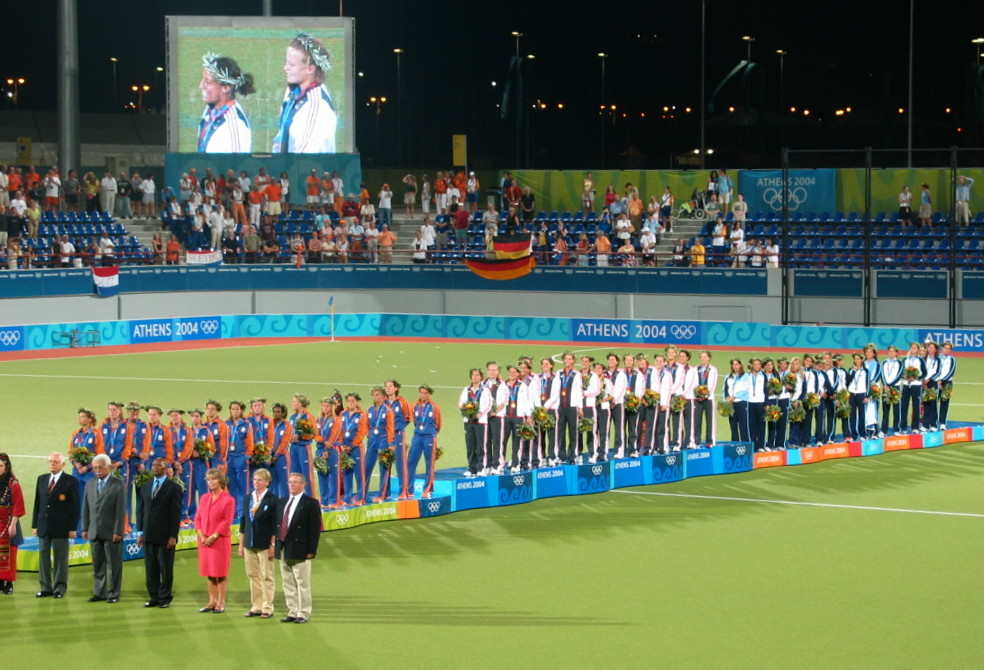
The Dutch team (blue/orange) on the podium after winning silver

1. Clarinda Sinnige (GK)
2. Lisanne de Roever (GK)
3. Macha van der Vaart
4. Fatima Moreira de Melo
5. Jiske Snoeks
6. Maartje Scheepstra
7. Miek van Geenhuizen
9. Sylvia Karres
10. Mijntje Donners (C)
11. Ageeth Boomgaardt
13. Minke Smeets
14. Minke Booij
15. Janneke Schopman
16. Chantal de Bruijn
17. Eefke Mulder
21. Lieve van Kessel

=== South Africa ===
The following is the South African roster in the women's field hockey tournament of the 2004 Summer Olympics.

Head coach: Ros Howell

1. Caroline Birt (GK)
3. Kate Hector
6. Anli Kotze
7. Natalie Fulton
8. Marsha Marescia
10. Johke Koornhof
12. Lindsey Carlisle
14. Kerry Bee
15. Pietie Coetzee
16. Jenny Wilson
24. Fiona Butler
25. Liesel Dorothy
28. Tsoanelo Pholo
30. Sharne Wehmeyer
31. Susan Webber (C)
32. Grazjyna Engelbrecht (GK)

=== South Korea ===
The following is the South Korean roster in the women's field hockey tournament of the 2004 Summer Olympics.

Head coach: Kim Sang-ryul

1. Park Yong-sook (GK)
2. Kim Yun-mi
3. Lee Jin-hui
4. Yoo Hee-joo
6. Kim Jeong-a
7. Lee Seon-ok
8. Lee Mi-seong
9. Park Eun-kyung
10. Oh Ko-woon
11. Kim Seong-eun
12. Go Gwang-min
13. Park Mi-hyun
15. Kim Jin-gyeong
16. Lim Ju-young (GK)
17. Kim Mi-seon
18. Park Jeong-suk
