= 2006 Women's Intercontinental Cup =

Field hockey tournament

2006 Women's Hockey Intercontinental Cup
Tournament details
- Host country: Italy
- City: Rome
- Dates: April 25 – May 6
- Teams: 14
- Venue: Euroma Hockey Stadium

Final positions
- Champions: England (2nd title)
- Runner-up: South Korea
- Third place: Japan

Tournament statistics
- Matches played: 42
- Goals scored: 151 (3.6 per match)
- Top scorer: 4 Players (see list below) (6 goals)
- Best player: (Japan) Sachimi Iwao

The 2006 Women's Hockey Intercontinental Cup was the seventh edition of the women's field hockey tournament. The event was held from 25 April–6 May, in Rome, Italy.

England won the tournament for the second time after defeating South Korea 2–1 in the final. Japan finished in third place, defeating the United States 4–1.

The tournament served as a qualifier for the 2006 FIH World Cup in Madrid, with the top five teams qualifying automatically.

== Qualification ==
Except for Africa, all other four confederations received quotas for teams to participate allocated by the International Hockey Federation based upon the FIH World Rankings. Those teams participated at their respective continental championships but could not qualify through it, and they received the chance to qualify through this tournament based on the final ranking at each competition.

Dates	Event	Location	Qualifier(s)
1–8 February 2004	2004 Hockey Asia Cup	New Delhi, India	Japan; China; South Korea
21–28 April 2004	2004 Pan American Cup	Bridgetown, Barbados	United States
14–20 August 2005	2005 EuroHockey Nations Championship	Dublin, Ireland	England; Ireland; Ukraine; Scotland; France
5–11 September 2005	2005 EuroHockey Nations Trophy	Baku, Azerbaijan	Azerbaijan; Italy
29 October–5 November 2005	2005 Oceania Cup	Auckland, New Zealand; Sydney, Australia	New Zealand

== Squads ==
Below is the list of participating squads.

Azerbaijan

Head Coach: Adil Pashayev

1. Tatyana Fomina (GK)
2. Tatyana Shukurova
3. Nazira Hidayatova
4. Emine Muzaffarova
5. Zarifahon Zeynalova
6. Feruza Makayeva
7. Lyudmyla Chequrko
8. Dilfuza Mirzaliyeva
9. Khatira Aliyeva
10. Zeynab Nuriyeva (c)
11. Gulnara Mikyliova
14. Mahira Ahmadova
15. Liana Nuriyeva
16. Marina Aliyeva
20. Viktoriya Shahbazova (GK)
21. Nataliya Sidorova
25. Inoyathon Jafarova
China

Head Coach: Kim Chang-Back

2. Huang Xuejiao
3. Chen Zhaoxia
4. Ma Yibo (c)
6. Mai Shaoyan
7. Song Qingling
8. Fu Baorong
9. Li Shuang
10. Gao Lihua
11. Tang Chunling
12. Zhou Wanfeng
13. Sun Zhen
15. Sun Sinan
16. Zhang Yimeng (GK)
17. Li Hongxia
18. Ren Ye
22. Chen Lizhu
28. Wang Yanhui
30. Si Qin Goa Wa (GK)
England

Head Coach: Danny Kerry

1. Carolyn Reid (GK)
2. Beth Storry (GK)
3. Lisa Wooding
5. Crista Cullen
6. Melanie Clewlow
7. Helen Grant
8. Helen Richardson (c)
10. Lucilla Wright
11. Kate Walsh
13. Jennie Bimson
14. Rachel Walker
15. Alex Danson
18. Sally Walton
20. Joanne Ellis
21. Alexandra Scott
22. Cathy Gilliat-Smith
26. Rebecca Herbert
27. Chloe Rogers
France

Head Coach: Steve Colledge

2. Emilie Peulmeule
3. Marie Celine Lamas
4. Aurelie Morin
5. Noehie Rogeau
6. Cécile Dagostino
7. Muriel Lazennec
9. Julie Gaillard
11. Emilie Begue
12. Philippine Berly
14. Aurelie Noel
15. Sophie Hure (c)
16. Peggy Bergère
17. Céline Orefice
18. Alicia Minet
20. Ines Plocque
22. Elise Preney
31. Anabelle Got (GK)
32. Marion Rehby (GK)
Ireland

Head Coach: Riet Kuper

1. Mary Goode (GK)
2. Angela Platt (GK)
4. Fiona Connery
5. Linda Caulfield (c)
6. Eimear Cregan
7. Suzanne Beaney
8. Catriona Carey
9. Bridget McKeever
10. Zanya Dahl
11. Jenny McDonough
12. Cathy McKean
13. Alexandra Speers
15. Ciara O'Brien
16. Jill Orbinson
17. Nikki Symmons
18. Katharine Elkin
19. Fiona Ferguson
26. Clare Parkhill
Italy

Head Coach: Franco Nicola

1. Roberta Lilliu (GK)
2. Stella Girotti (c)
4. Anna Tagliasacchi
5. Mercedes Salessi
6. Simona Berrino
7. Giorgia Carradori
8. Maria Victoria Corso
9. Francesca Faustini
10. Daniela Possali
11. Alessandra Filippi
12. Michela Riva (GK)
13. Ana Scarone
15. Francesca Zamboni
16. Matilde Canavosio
17. Chiara Tiddi
19. Giorgia Cuccu
21. Valentina Quaranta
22. Tatiana Nicoletti
Japan

Head Coach: John Sheahan

1. Rie Terazono
3. Mayumi Ono
4. Hiromi Hashimoto
5. Chile Kimura
6. Yukari Yamamoto
7. Rika Komazawa
8. Sakae Morimoto
9. Kaori Chiba
10. Tomomi Komori
11. Toshie Tsukui
12. Chie Akutsu
13. Sachimi Iwao
14. Akemi Kato (c)
15. Miyuki Nakagawa
16. Misaki Ozawa
17. Mika Iimura
19. Ikuko Okamura (GK)
20. Yuko Kitano
New Zealand

Head Coach: Ian Rutledge

1. Kayla Sharland
2. Emily Naylor
3. Krystal Forgesson
4. Kate Saunders
11. Stacey Carr
12. Elizabeth Ryan
15. Suzie Muirhead (c)
16. Beth Jurgeleit (GK)
18. Clarissa Eshuis
19. Diana Weavers
19. Jane Maley
20. Frances Kreft
21. Niniwa Roberts
23. Tara Drysdale
25. Kate Mahon
26. Anita Wawatai (GK)
27. Bridget Kight
28. Charlotte Harrisson
Scotland

Head Coach: Lesley Hobley

1. Debbie McLeod (GK)
2. Cath Rae (GK)
3. Vikki Bunce
4. Louise Munn
5. Louise Gordon
6. Julie Kilpatrick
7. Jane Burley
8. Catriona Forrest
9. Samantha Judge
10. Rhona Simpson
11. Holly Cram
12. Linda Clement (c)
13. Cheryl Valentine
14. Emma Rochlin
15. Alison Rowatt
16. Catriona Semple
17. Nikki Kidd
18. Louise Carroll
South Korea

Head Coach: Huh Sang-Young

1. Lim Ju-yong
2. Cho Hye-sook
3. Lee Jin-hee
4. Park Young-soon
5. Choi Eun-young
6. Park Seon-mi
7. Oh Ko-woon
8. Kim Jung-hee
9. Park Mi-hyun
10. Kim Jin-kyoung
11. Ko Kwang-min
12. Park Jeong-sook
13. Kim Mi-seon
14. Gim Sang-hee
15. Kim Bo-mi
16. Jang Soo-ji (GK)
17. Park Na-hyun
18. Kim Jong-eun
Ukraine

Head Coach: Tetyana Zhuk

1. Olha Fisyun (GK)
2. Viktoria Novik
3. Olga Gulenko
4. Olena Fritche
5. Olena Ivakhnenko
6. Olha Hryzodub
7. Zhanna Savenko
8. Tetyana Kobzenko (c)
9. Maryna Khilko
10. Natalya Vsayukova
11. Maryna Vynohradova
12. Yana Vorushylo
13. Maryna Litvinchuk
14. Tetyana Selenko
15. Nataliya Davydenko
16. Alvina Budonna (GK)
17. Iryna Vyhanyayko
18. Diana Tahiyeva
United States

Head Coach: Lee Bodimeade

1. Kayla Bashore
2. Melissa Leonetti
3. Angie Loy
4. Kelly Doton
6. Robyn Kenney
7. Kelsey Keeran
8. Rachel Dawson
10. Tiffany Snow
11. Sara Silvetti
12. April Fronzoni
16. Barbara Weinberg (GK)
17. Carrie Lingo
21. Claire Laubach
22. Kate Barber
24. Dina Rizzo
25. Amy Tran (GK)
26. Kristi Gannon
28. Lauren Powley

== Umpires ==
Below are the 14 umpires appointed by the International Hockey Federation:

- Julie Beamish (IRL)
- Caroline Brunekreef (NED)
- Peri Buckley (AUS)
- Marelize de Klerk (RSA)
- Carolina de la Fuente (ARG)
- Jean Duncan (SCO)
- Belén González (ESP)
- Soledad Iparraguirre (ARG)
- Kang Hyun-young (KOR)
- Miao Lin (CHN)
- Lisette Klassen (NED)
- Petra Muller (GER)
- Lisa Roach (AUS)
- Kazuko Yasueda (JPN)

== Results ==
All times are Central European Summer Time (UTC+02:00)

=== Preliminary round ===
==== Pool A ====
Pos	Team	Pld	W	D	L	GF	GA	GD	Pts	Qualification
1	England	5	5	0	0	22	2	+20	15	Semi-Finals and 2006 FIH World Cup
2	Japan	5	4	0	1	17	5	+12	12	Semi-Finals and 2006 FIH World Cup
3	China	5	3	0	2	9	7	+2	9	
4	France	5	2	0	3	6	19	−13	6	
5	Ukraine	5	1	0	4	4	13	−9	3	
6	Scotland	5	0	0	5	4	16	−12	0	

Source: SportCentric
Rules for classification: 1) points; 2) goal difference; 3) goals scored; 4) head-to-head result.

25 April 2006
09:00

China	2–0	Scotland
Song 60'; Tang 68'	Report

Umpires:
Carolina de la Fuente (ARG)
Lisa Roach (AUS)

25 April 2006
11:15

England	3–0	Ukraine
Ellis 19'; Clewlow 35'; Walton 51'	Report

Umpires:
Peri Buckley (AUS)
Miao Lin (CHN)

25 April 2006
18:00

Japan	5–0	France
Tsukui 29'; Iwao 36'; Chiba 43'; Komori 54'; Komazawa 59'	Report

Umpires:
Soledad Iparraguirre (ARG)
Julie Beamish (IRL)

26 April 2006
15:30

China	1–2	England
Ren 7'	Report	Cullen 29'; Richardson 70'

Umpires:
Soledad Iparraguirre (ARG)
Belén González (ESP)

26 April 2006
18:00

Ukraine	1–4	Japan
Vynohradova 37'	Report	Komori 9', 55'; Chiba 45', 70'

Umpires:
Jean Duncan (ECO)
Petra Müller (GER)

26 April 2006
20:30

France	3–1	Scotland
Hure 48'; Oréfice 54'; Berley 60'	Report	Simpson 9'

Umpires:
Kazuko Yasueda (JPN)
Caroline Brunekreef (NED)

28 April 2006
15:30

Scotland	1–5	Japan
Rochlin 53'	Report	Iwao 12'; Chiba 19', 46'; Komori 40'; Ozawa 51'

Umpires:
Marelize de Klerk (RSA)
Belén González (ESP)

28 April 2006
18:00

England	10–0	France
Walker 13'; Cullen 17'; Danson 22'; Wright 32', 65'; Grant 51', 52'; Wooding 59'; Richardson 62'; Walton 67'	Report

Umpires:
Carolina de la Fuente (ARG)
Lisette Klaassen (NED)

28 April 2006
20:30

Ukraine	1–3	China
Vynohradova 11'	Report	Li H. 26'; Zhou 35'; Fu 67'

Umpires:
Kang Hyun-Young (KOR)
Kazuko Yasueda (JPN)

30 April 2006
13:30

France	2–0	Ukraine
Berley 6', 58'	Report

Umpires:
Miao Lin (CHN)
Belén González (ESP)

30 April 2006
16:00

Japan	3–0	China
Komori 34'; Ono 50'; Yamamoto 53'	Report

Umpires:
Peri Buckley (AUS)
Lisette Klaassen (NED)

30 April 2006
18:30

Scotland	1–4	England
Judge 62'	Report	Walker 10'; Wright 26', 56'; Walsh 60'

Umpires:
Kang Hyun-Young (KOR)
Petra Müller (GER)

2 May 2006
09:00

England	3–0	Japan
Danson 13'; Cullen 35'; Ellis 41'	Report

Umpires:
Soledad Iparraguirre (ARG)
Carolina de la Fuente (ARG)

2 May 2006
11:15

China	3–1	France
Ma 13'; Ren 39'; Chen Z. 57'	Report	Oréfice 40'

Umpires:
Marelize de Klerk (RSA)
Petra Müller (GER)

2 May 2006
13:30

Ukraine	2–1	Scotland
Vynohradova 56'; Salenko 67'	Report	Simpson 48'

Umpires:
Julie Beamish (IRL)
Kang Hyun-Young (KOR)

==== Pool B ====
Pos	Team	Pld	W	D	L	GF	GA	GD	Pts	Qualification
1	South Korea	5	4	1	0	16	4	+12	13	Semi-Finals and 2006 FIH World Cup
2	United States	5	3	1	1	8	7	+1	10	Semi-Finals and 2006 FIH World Cup
3	New Zealand	5	2	1	2	10	7	+3	7	
4	Ireland	5	1	4	0	3	2	+1	7	
5	Italy (H)	5	1	0	4	4	13	−9	3	
6	Azerbaijan	5	0	1	4	3	11	−8	1	

Source: SportCentric
Rules for classification: 1) points; 2) goal difference; 3) goals scored; 4) head-to-head result.
(H) Hosts

25 April 2006
13:30

United States	1–1	Ireland
Doton 70'	Report	McKean 41'

Umpires:
Jean Duncan (ECO)
Kang Hyun-Young (KOR)

25 April 2006
15:45

New Zealand	2–1	Azerbaijan
Weavers 46'; Harrison 56'	Report	Jafarova 23'

Umpires:
Caroline Brunekreef (NED)
Kazuko Yasueda (JPN)

25 April 2006
20:30

Italy	1–4	South Korea
Nicoletti 55'	Report	Park Y. 12', 58'; Park S. 18'; Kim B. 27'

Umpires:
Marelize de Klerk (RSA)
Lisette Klaassen (NED)

27 April 2006
15:30

New Zealand	0–1	United States
	Report	Lingo 57'

Umpires:
Peri Buckley (AUS)
Julie Beamish (IRL)

27 April 2006
18:00

South Korea	0–0	Ireland
	Report

Umpires:
Lisa Roach (AUS)
Miao Lin (CHN)

27 April 2006
20:30

Azerbaijan	0–1	Italy
	Report	Faustini 8'

Umpires:
Carolina de la Fuente (ARG)
Petra Müller (GER)

29 April 2006
15:30

South Korea	4–0	Azerbaijan
Kim B. 15'; Oh 20'; Park Y. 59', 66'	Report

Umpires:
Jean Duncan (SCO)
Julie Beamish (IRL)

29 April 2006
18:00

Italy	1–2	United States
Girotti 16'	Report	Loy 13', 68'

Umpires:
Lisa Roach (AUS)
Soledad Iparraguirre (ARG)

29 April 2006
20:30

Ireland	0–0	New Zealand
	Report

Umpires:
Caroline Brunekreef (NED)
Marelize de Klerk (RSA)

1 May 2006
13:30

United States	4–2	Azerbaijan
Fronzoni 12'; Snow 13'; Rizzo 34'; Kenny 66'	Report	Z. Nuriyeva 57'; L. Nuriyeva 59'

Umpires:
Kang Hyun-Young (KOR)
Miao Lin (CHN)

1 May 2006
16:00

Ireland	2–1	Italy
Cregan 58'; Carey 70'	Report	Faustini 48'

Umpires:
Peri Buckley (AUS)
Carolina de la Fuente (ARG)

1 May 2006
18:30

New Zealand	3–5	South Korea
Maley 34'; Muirhead 54'; Weavers 68'	Report	Kim Ju. 21', 38'; Kim M. 54', 50'; Ko 58'

Umpires:
Kazuko Yasueda (JPN)
Marelize de Klerk (RSA)

2 May 2006
15:45

Azerbaijan	0–0	Ireland
	Report

Umpires:
Lisa Roach (AUS)
Lisette Klaassen (NED)

2 May 2006
18:00

South Korea	3–0	United States
Park J. 21', 70'; Ko 37'	Report

Umpires:
Caroline Brunekreef (NED)
Peri Buckley (AUS)

2 May 2006
20:30

Italy	0–5	New Zealand
	Report	Weavers 19'; Eshuis 35'; Forgesson 37'; Ryan 52'; Carr 54'

Umpires:
Miao Lin (CHN)
Jean Duncan (SCO)

=== Classification round ===
==== Ninth to twelfth place classification ====
Crossover
4 May 2006
Ukraine	1
Azerbaijan	4
4 May 2006
Italy	1
Scotland	5

Ninth Place
5 May 2006
Azerbaijan	3
Scotland	2
Eleventh Place
5 May 2006
Ukraine	5
Italy	0

===== Crossover =====
4 May 2006
08:00

Ukraine	1–4	Azerbaijan
Vynohradova 28'	Report	Sidorova 5'; Jafarova 49', 62'; Mirzaliyava 68'

Umpires:
Miao Lin (CHN)
Julie Beamish (IRL)

4 May 2006
10:30

Italy	1–5	Scotland
Salessi 43'	Report	Simpson 11', 23', 33', 61'; Cram 65'

Umpires:
Lisette Klaassen (NED)
Belén González (ESP)

===== Eleventh and twelfth place =====
5 May 2006
14:30

Ukraine	5–0	Italy
Vynohradova 2', 23'; Savenko 17'; Khilko 27'; Vasyukova 30'	Report

Umpires:
Jean Duncan (SCO)
Belén González (ESP)

===== Ninth and tenth place =====
5 May 2006
17:15

Azerbaijan	3–2	Scotland
Zeynalova 11'; Jafarova 42'; Sidorova 56'	Report	Judge 4'; Rochlin 44'

Umpires:
Kang Hyun-Young (KOR)
Miao Lin (CHN)

==== Fifth to eighth place classification ====
Crossover
4 May 2006
China	6
Ireland	0
4 May 2006
New Zealand	0
France	1

Fifth Place
6 May 2006
China	3
France	1
Seventh Place
5 May 2006
Ireland	1
New Zealand	2

===== Crossover =====
4 May 2006
13:00

China	6–0	Ireland
Zhou 24'; Chen Z. 27', 46'; Ma 38'; Gao 50'; Li H. 57'	Report

Umpires:
Lisa Roach (AUS)
Soledad Iparraguirre (ARG)

4 May 2006
15:30

New Zealand	0–1	France
	Report	Lazennec 36'

Umpires:
Carolina de la Fuente (ARG)
Marelize de Klerk (RSA)

===== Seventh and eighth place =====
5 May 2006
20:00

Ireland	1–2	New Zealand
Cregan 46'	Report	Carr 44'; Eshuis 54'

Umpires:
Petra Muller (GER)
Lisa Roach (AUS)

===== Fifth and sixth place =====
6 May 2006
12:15

China	3–1	France
Zhou 3'; Ren 42', 61'	Report	Minét 70'

Umpires:
Soledad Iparraguirre (ARG)
Marelize de Klerk (RSA)

==== First to fourth place classification ====
Semi-finals
4 May 2006
England (a.e.t)	1
United States	0
4 May 2006
South Korea	1
Japan	0

Final
6 May 2006
England	2
South Korea	1
Third Place
6 May 2006
United States	1
Japan	4

===== Semi-finals =====
4 May 2006
18:00

England	1–0 (a.e.t.)	United States
Rogers 85+'	Report

Umpires:
Kazuko Yasueda (JPN)
Kang Hyun-Young (KOR)

4 May 2006
20:30

South Korea	1–0	Japan
Park M. 49'	Report

Umpires:
Caroline Brunekreef (NED)
Peri Buckley (AUS)

===== Third and fourth place =====
6 May 2006
09:30

United States	1–4	Japan
Lingo 29'	Report	Iwao 9'; Tsukui 27'; Komori 51'; Chiba 54'

Umpires:
Jean Duncan (SCO)
Caroline Brunekreef (NED)

===== Final =====
6 May 2006
15:00

England	2–1	South Korea
Herbert 59'; Wright 65'	Report	Kim M. 43'

Umpires:
Peri Buckley (AUS)
Carolina de la Fuente (ARG)

== Awards ==
Player of the Tournament	Top Goalscorer	Goalkeeper of the Tournament	Fair Play Trophy
(Japan) Sachimi Iwao	4 Players (see list below)	(United States) Amy Tran	Scotland

== Final standings ==
As per statistical convention in field hockey, matches decided in extra time are counted as wins and losses, while matches decided by penalty shoot-outs are counted as draws.

Pos	Team	Pld	W	D	L	GF	GA	GD	Pts	Status
1st place, gold medalist(s)	England	7	7	0	0	25	3	+22	21	Qualified for 2006 FIH World Cup
2nd place, silver medalist(s)	South Korea	7	5	1	1	18	6	+12	16	Qualified for 2006 FIH World Cup
3rd place, bronze medalist(s)	Japan	7	5	0	2	21	7	+14	15	Qualified for 2006 FIH World Cup
4	United States	7	3	1	3	9	12	−3	10	Qualified for 2006 FIH World Cup
5	China	7	5	0	2	18	8	+10	15	Qualified for 2006 FIH World Cup
6	France	7	3	0	4	8	22	−14	9	
7	New Zealand	7	3	1	3	12	9	+3	10	
8	Ireland	7	1	4	2	4	10	−6	7	
9	Azerbaijan	7	2	1	4	10	14	−4	7	
10	Scotland	7	1	0	6	11	20	−9	3	
11	Ukraine	7	2	0	5	10	17	−7	6	
12	Italy (H)	7	1	0	6	5	23	−18	3	

Source: SportCentric
(H) Hosts

== Goalscorers ==
There were 151 goals scored in 42 matches, for an average of 3.6 goals per match.

6 goals

- (Japan) Kaori Chiba
- (Japan) Tomomi Komori
- (Scotland) Rhona Simpson
- (Ukraine) Maryna Vynohradova

5 goals

- (England) Lucilla Wright

4 goals

- (Azerbaijan) Inoyathon Jafarova
- (China) Ren Ye
- (South Korea) Park Young-Soon

3 goals

- (China) Zhou Wanfeng
- (China) Chen Zhaoxia
- (England) Crista Cullen
- (France) Philippine Berley
- (Japan) Sachimi Iwao
- (New Zealand) Diana Weavers
- (South Korea) Kim Mi-Seon

2 goals

- (Azerbaijan) Nataliya Sidorova
- (China) Li Hongxia
- (China) Ma Yibo
- (England) Alexandra Danson
- (England) Joanne Ellis
- (England) Helen Grant
- (England) Helen Richardson
- (England) Rachel Walker
- (England) Sally Walton
- (France) Céline Oréfice
- (Ireland) Eimear Cregan
- (Italy) Francesca Faustini
- (Japan) Toshie Tsukui
- (New Zealand) Stacey Carr
- (New Zealand) Clarissa Eshuis
- (Scotland) Samantha Judge
- (Scotland) Emma Rochlin
- (South Korea) Kim Bo-Mi
- (South Korea) Park Jeong-Sook
- (South Korea) Kim Jung-Hee
- (South Korea) Ko Kwang-Min
- (United States) Carrie Lingo
- (United States) Angela Loy

1 goal

- (Azerbaijan) Dilfuza Mirzaliyava
- (Azerbaijan) Liana Nuriyeva
- (Azerbaijan) Zeynab Nuriyeva
- (Azerbaijan) Zarifahon Zeynalova
- (China) Fu Baorong
- (China) Tang Chunling
- (China) Gao Lihua
- (China) Song Qingling
- (England) Melanie Clewlow
- (England) Rebecca Herbert
- (England) Chloe Rogers
- (England) Kate Walsh
- (England) Lisa Wooding
- (France) Sophie Hure
- (France) Muriel Lazennec
- (France) Alicia Minét
- (Ireland) Catriona Carey
- (Ireland) Catherine McKean
- (Italy) Stella Girotti
- (Italy) Tatiana Nicoletti
- (Italy) Mercedes Salessi
- (Japan) Rika Komazawa
- (Japan) Mayumi Ono
- (Japan) Misaki Ozawa
- (Japan) Yukari Yamamoto
- (New Zealand) Krystal Forgesson
- (New Zealand) Charlotte Harrison
- (New Zealand) Jane Maley
- (New Zealand) Suzanne Muirhead
- (New Zealand) Elizabeth Ryan
- (Scotland) Holly Cram
- (South Korea) Oh Ko-Woon
- (South Korea) Park Mi-Hyun
- (South Korea) Park Seon-Mi
- (Ukraine) Maryna Khilko
- (Ukraine) Tetyana Salenko
- (Ukraine) Zhanna Savenko
- (Ukraine) Natalya Vasyukova
- (United States) Kelly Doton
- (United States) April Fronzoni
- (United States) Robyn Kenny
- (United States) Dina Rizzo
- (United States) Tiffany Snow
