= Field hockey at the 2006 Asian Games – Women's tournament =

Women's field hockey tournament at the 2006 Asian Games
Tournament details
- Host country: Qatar
- City: Doha
- Dates: 2–13 December 2006
- Teams: 8
- Venue: Al-Rayyan Hockey Field

Medalists
gold medal	China
silver medal	Japan
bronze medal	India

Tournament statistics
- Matches played: 24
- Goals scored: 128 (5.33 per match)
- Top scorer: (Japan) Kaori Chiba (12 goals)

Women's field hockey at the 2006 Asian Games was held in Al-Rayyan Hockey Field, Doha from December 2 to December 13, 2006.

== Squads ==
China	Chinese Taipei	Hong Kong	India
Nie Yali; Chen Zhaoxia; Ma Yibo; Mai Shaoyan; Huang Junxia; Fu Baorong; Li Shuang; Gao Lihua; Tang Chunling; Zhou Wanfeng; Sun Zhen; Zhang Yimeng; Li Hongxia; Ren Ye; Chen Qiuqi; Bao Ejing	Lee Hsing-ling; Yang Ai-ling; Chen Mei-chen; Chang Ya-fang; Tien Min-na; Chang Yu-ching; Chen Chen-tzu; Yang Wan-wen; Chen Hsiu-chin; Liu Yi-wen; Wu Pei-ting; Shih Shu-hsin; Lin Yi-ching; Chen Chia-jung; Huang Shih-han; Su Pei-ling	Lee Mei Chai; Wong Lok Yan; Melanie Miers; Olivia Chiu; Miranda Hung; Barbara Mountain; Kate Wong; Sandra Frankland; Christie Fearnside; Katherine Mountain; Patricia Chiu; Dawn Strachan; Lo I Ka; Queenie Ho; Yii Sui Suet; Sophie Foxall	Dipika Murthy; Suman Bala; Rajwinder Kaur; Asunta Lakra; Binita Xess; Surinder Kaur; Mamta Kharab; Marita Tirkey; Joydeep Kaur; Ritu Rani; Jasjeet Kaur Handa; Jyoti Sunita Kullu; Pushpa Pradhan; Saba Anjum Karim; Binita Toppo; Subhadra Pradhan
Japan	Malaysia	South Korea	
Rie Terazono; Ikuko Okamura; Mayumi Ono; Keiko Miura; Chie Kimura; Yukari Yamamoto; Rika Komazawa; Sakae Morimoto; Kaori Chiba; Tomomi Komori; Toshie Tsukui; Yuko Kitano; Sachimi Iwao; Akemi Kato; Miyuki Nakagawa; Misaki Ozawa	Intan Nurairah Khusaini; Sebah Kari; Noor Hasliza; Siti Noor Amarina Ruhaini; Juliani Mohd Din; Norfaraha Hashim; Siti Rahmah Othman; Nurul Nadia Mokhtar; Chitra Devi Arumugam; Kannagi Arumugam; Nadia Abdul Rahman; Norbaini Hashim; Ernawati Mahmud; Catherine Lambor; Siti Sarah Nurfarahah; Fauziah Mizan	Lim Ju-young; Lee Jin-hee; Park Young-soon; Choi Eun-young; Park Seon-mi; Oh Ko-woon; Kim Jung-hee; Park Mi-hyun; Kim Jin-kyoung; Jeong Jin-ok; Han Tae-jeong; Kang Na-young; Jang Soo-ji; Kim Mi-seon; Park Jeong-sook; Kim Seong-eun	

== Results ==
All times are Arabia Standard Time (UTC+03:00)

=== Preliminary round ===
Pos	Team	Pld	W	D	L	GF	GA	GD	Pts	Qualification
1	Japan	6	5	1	0	35	2	+33	16	Gold-medal match
2	China	6	5	0	1	24	5	+19	15	Gold-medal match
3	South Korea	6	4	1	1	32	5	+27	13	Bronze-medal match
4	India	6	3	0	3	21	10	+11	9	Bronze-medal match
5	Malaysia	6	2	0	4	8	20	−12	6	Fifth-place match
6	Chinese Taipei	6	0	1	5	0	36	−36	1	Fifth-place match
7	Hong Kong	6	0	1	5	1	43	−42	1	

Source: Doha2006
Rules for classification: 1) points; 2) goal difference; 3) goals scored; 4) head-to-head result.

==== Pool matches ====
2 December 2006
10:00

Hong Kong	0–9	China
		Chen Z. 3', 22', 65'; Ma 5'; Ren 9'; Li H. 25'; Chen Q. 26'; Tang 39'; Gao 54'

Umpires:
Wendy Stewart (CAN)
Nor Piza Hassan (MAS)

2 December 2006
12:00

Malaysia	0–7	Japan
		Chiba 5', 9', 39'; Iwao 18'; Ozawa 33', 54'; Tsukui 60'

Umpires:
Marelize de Klerk (RSA)
Lee Kum-Joo (KOR)

2 December 2006
15:00

South Korea	8–0	Chinese Taipei
Park M. 3', 70'; Choi 14', 16'; Kang 29'; Park Y. 31'; Han 32', 55'

Umpires:
Margaret Knipe (GBR)
Sunita Pant (IND)

3 December 2006
12:00

Hong Kong	1–3	Malaysia
O. Chiu 19'		Kannagi 5'; Siti R. 40', 65'

Umpires:
Miao Lin (CHN)
Kusuda Yumiko (JPN)

3 December 2006
15:00

South Korea	2–2	Japan
Lee 33'; Jeong 53'		Miura 19', 28'

Umpires:
Marelize de Klerk (RSA)
Wendy Stewart (CAN)

3 December 2006
17:00

Chinese Taipei	0–7	India
		Jyoti 18', 39', 58'; Pradhan 38'; Surinder 45', 66'; Saba 49'

Umpires:
Kitty Yau (HKG)
Nor Piza Hassan (MAS)

5 December 2006
09:00

Japan	12–0	Chinese Taipei
Yamamoto 4'; Komori 7', 8', 69'; Miura 11', 35'; Chiba 13', 54', 68', 70'; Komazawa 37'; Nakagawa 62'

Umpires:
Margaret Knipe (GBR)
Miao Lin (CHN)

5 December 2006
11:00

Hong Kong	0–15	South Korea
		Park M. 2', 62', 64', 70'; Kim M. 6'; Oh 11'; Kim S. 14'; Park Y. 18', 48', 51', 70'; Park J. 33', 53'; Kang 34'; Kim J. 55'

Umpires:
Yumiko Kusuda (JPN)
Sunita Pant (IND)

5 December 2006
14:00

China	3–1	India
Ren 8'; Fu 49', 56'		Surinder 57'

Umpires:
Wendy Stewart (CAN)
Lee Kum-joo (KOR)

6 December 2006
14:00

South Korea	0–1	China
		Ma 34'

Umpires:
Marelize de Klerk (RSA)
Nor Piza Hassan (MAS)

6 December 2006
16:00

Chinese Taipei	0–0	Hong Kong

Umpires:
Louise Knipe (GBR)
Yumiko Kusuda (JPN)

6 December 2006
18:00

India	4–2	Malaysia
Asunta 3'; Toppo 24'; Saba 29'; Mamta 68'		Kannagi 9'; Nadia 54'

Umpires:
Lee Kum-joo (KOR)
Miao Lin (CHN)

8 December 2006
09:00

India	7–0	Hong Kong
Surinder 21', 35', 54', 68'; Jyoti 27', 47'; Jasjeet 50'

Umpires:
Yumiko Kusuda (JPN)
Miao Lin (CHN)

8 December 2006
11:00

China	0–3	Japan
		Komazawa 22'; Morimoto 25'; Komori 35'

Umpires:
Wendy Stewart (CAN)
Lee Kum-joo (KOR)

8 December 2006
14:00

Malaysia	2–0	Chinese Taipei
Nadia 8'; Siti N. 39'

Umpires:
Kitty Yau (HKG)
Sunita Pant (IND)

9 December 2006
14:00

Chinese Taipei	0–7	China
		Ma 8', 13', 30'; Li H. 21'; Ren 40', 60'; Chen Q. 54'

Umpires:
Kitty Yau (HKG)
Lee Kum-joo (KOR)

9 December 2006
16:00

Japan	2–0	India
Komori 6'; Chiba 9'

Umpires:
Marelize de Klerk (RSA)
Wendy Stewart (CAN)

9 December 2006
18:00

Malaysia	0–4	South Korea
		Kim M. 2'; Park M. 27'; Kang 34'; Choi 55'

Umpires:
Louise Knipe (GBR)
Miao Lin (CHN)

11 December 2006
10:00

China	4–1	Malaysia
Ren 14'; Ma 32', 53'; Tang 45'		Nurul 45'

Umpires:
Yumiko Kusuda (JPN)
Sunita Pant (IND)

11 December 2006
12:00

Japan	9–0	Hong Kong
Yamamoto 17'; Komazawa 19'; Kitano 28'; Komori 39', 49'; Chiba 45', 47', 57', 58'

Umpires:
Nor Piza Hassan (MAS)
Louise Knipe (GBR)

11 December 2006
15:00

India	2–3	South Korea
Surinder 31'; Saba 52'		Park Y. 20', 61', 66'

Umpires:
Marelize de Klerk (RSA)
Miao Lin (CHN)

=== Classification round ===
==== Fifth and sixth place ====
13 December 2006
11:30

Malaysia	5–0	Chinese Taipei
Intan 4'; Siti R. 22', 32'; Chitra 28'; Nadia 57'

Umpires:
Sunita Pant (IND)
Yumiko Kusuda (JPN)

==== Bronze-medal match ====
13 December 2006
15:00

South Korea	0–1	India
		Mamta 16'

Umpires:
Wendy Stewart (CAN)
Miao Lin (CHN)

==== Gold-medal match ====
13 December 2006
17:30

Japan	0–1	China
		Ren 41'

Umpires:
Marelize de Klerk (RSA)
Lee Kum-joo (KOR)

== Statistics ==
=== Final standings ===
As per statistical convention in field hockey, matches decided in extra time are counted as wins and losses, while matches decided by penalty shoot-outs are counted as draws.

Pos	Team	Pld	W	D	L	GF	GA	GD	Pts	Status
1st place, gold medalist(s)	China	7	6	0	1	25	5	+20	18	Qualified for 2008 Summer Olympics
2nd place, silver medalist(s)	Japan	7	5	1	1	35	3	+32	16	
3rd place, bronze medalist(s)	India	7	4	0	3	22	10	+12	12	
4	South Korea	7	4	1	2	32	6	+26	13	
5	Malaysia	7	3	0	4	13	20	−7	9	
6	Chinese Taipei	7	0	1	6	0	41	−41	1	
7	Hong Kong	6	0	1	5	1	43	−42	1	

Source: Doha2006

=== Goalscorers ===
There were 128 goals scored in 24 matches, for an average of 5.33 goals per match.

12 goals

- (Japan) Kaori Chiba

8 goals

- (India) Surinder Kaur
- (South Korea) Park Young-Soon

7 goals

- (China) Ma Yibo
- (Japan) Tomomi Komori
- (South Korea) Park Mi-Hyun

6 goals

- (China) Ren Ye

5 goals

- (India) Jyoti Sunita Kullu

4 goals

- (Japan) Keiko Miura
- (Malaysia) Siti Othman

3 goals

- (China) Chen Zhaoxia
- (India) Saba Anjum
- (Japan) Rika Komazawa
- (Malaysia) Nadia Rahman
- (South Korea) Choi Eun-Young
- (South Korea) Kang Na-Young

2 goals

- (China) Fu Baorong
- (China) Tang Chunling
- (China) Li Hongxia
- (China) Chen Qiuqi
- (India) Mamta Kharab
- (Japan) Misaki Ozawa
- (Japan) Yukari Yamamoto
- (Malaysia) Kannagi Arumugam
- (South Korea) Park Jeong-Sook
- (South Korea) Kim Mi-Seon
- (South Korea) Han Tae-Jeong

1 goal

- (China) Gao Lihua
- (Hong Kong) Olivia Chiu
- (India) Jasjeet Kaur Handa
- (India) Asunta Lakra
- (India) Subhadra Pradhan
- (India) Binita Toppo
- (Japan) Sachimi Iwao
- (Japan) Yuko Kitano
- (Japan) Sakae Morimoto
- (Japan) Miyuki Nakagawa
- (Japan) Toshie Tsukui
- (Malaysia) Chitra Arumugam
- (Malaysia) Intan Khusaini
- (Malaysia) Nurul Mokhtar
- (Malaysia) Siti Ruhani
- (South Korea) Lee Jin-Hee
- (South Korea) Kim Jin-Kyoung
- (South Korea) Jeong Jin-Ok
- (South Korea) Oh Ko-Woon
- (South Korea) Kim Seong-Eun
