= 2009 Women's Hockey Champions Challenge I =

International field hockey tournament

Tournament details
- Host country: South Africa
- City: Cape Town
- Dates: 11 October – 18 October
- Teams: 7
- Venue: Hartleyvale Stadium

Final positions
- Champions: New Zealand (2nd title)
- Runner-up: South Africa
- Third place: Japan

Tournament statistics
- Matches played: 18
- Goals scored: 50 (2.78 per match)
- Top scorer(s): (New Zealand) Clarissa Eshuis (South Africa) Farah Fredericks (4 goals)
- Best player: (New Zealand) Gemma Flynn

The 2009 Women's Hockey Champions Challenge I is the fifth tournament of the field hockey championship for women. It was held from 11 to 18 October 2009 in Cape Town, South Africa. The tournament was won by New Zealand and promoted to the Champions Trophy in 2011.

== Results ==
All times are South African Standard Time (UTC+02:00)

=== Preliminary round ===
==== Pool A ====
Pos	Team	Pld	W	D	L	GF	GA	GD	Pts	Qualification
1	South Africa (H)	3	3	0	0	8	2	+6	9	Advanced to Medal Round
2	Japan	3	2	0	1	8	4	+4	6	Advanced to Medal Round
3	Chile	3	0	1	2	0	2	−2	1	
4	Azerbaijan	3	0	1	2	0	8	−8	1	

Source: FIH
Rules for classification: 1) points; 2) goal difference; 3) goals scored; 4) head-to-head result.
(H) Hosts

11 October 2009
14:00

Japan	5–0	Azerbaijan
Komazawa 16'; Yamada 31'; Murakami 34'; Iwao 44'; Nagayama 54'	Report

Umpires:
Soledad Iparraguirre (ARG)
Kelly Hudson (NZL)

11 October 2009
17:00

Chile	0–1	South Africa
	Report	Taylor 8'

Umpires:
Julie Ashton-Lucy (AUS)
Irene Clelland (SCO)

12 October 2009
15:00

Chile	0–0	Azerbaijan
	Report

Umpires:
Michelle Joubert (RSA)
Claire Adenot (FRA)

12 October 2009
17:00

South Africa	4–2	Japan
Wilson 12'; Bright 29'; Fredericks 37'; Woods 57'	Report	Arai 13', 68'

Umpires:
Frances Block (ENG)
Carol Metchette (IRL)

14 October 2009
13:00

Japan	1–0	Chile
Nakashima 21'	Report

Umpires:
Julie Ashton-Lucy (AUS)
Michelle Joubert (RSA)

14 October 2009
17:00

South Africa	3–0	Azerbaijan
Fredericks 11', 18'; Russell 64'	Report

Umpires:
Frances Block (ENG)
Kelly Hudson (NZL)

==== Pool B ====
Pos	Team	Pld	W	D	L	GF	GA	GD	Pts	Qualification
1	New Zealand	2	2	0	0	7	2	+5	6	Advanced to Medal Round
2	Spain	2	1	0	1	4	4	0	3	Advanced to Medal Round
3	Italy	2	0	0	2	3	8	−5	0	

Source: FIH
Rules for classification: 1) points; 2) goal difference; 3) goals scored; 4) head-to-head result.

11 October 2009
12:00

Spain	4–1	Italy
Comerma 3', 50'; Piñeiro 28'; Muñoz 49'	Report	Pacella 40'

Umpires:
Frances Block (ENG)
Michelle Joubert (RSA)

12 October 2009
13:00

New Zealand	3–0	Spain
Sharland 2'; Eshuis 20'; Punt 49'	Report

Umpires:
Soledad Iparraguirre (ARG)
Irene Clelland (SCO)

14 October 2009
15:00

Italy	2–4	New Zealand
Faustini 17', 32'	Report	Glynn 30'; Punt 32'; Harrison 52'; Eshuis 68'

Umpires:
Carol Metchette (IRL)
Claire Adenot (FRA)

=== Classification round ===
==== Pool C ====
Pos	Team	Pld	W	D	L	GF	GA	GD	Pts	Qualification
1	South Africa (H)	3	2	1	0	8	5	+3	7	Advanced to Final
2	New Zealand	3	1	1	1	6	4	+2	4	Advanced to Final
3	Japan	3	1	1	1	3	4	−1	4	
4	Spain	3	0	1	2	0	4	−4	1	

Source: FIH
Rules for classification: 1) points; 2) goal difference; 3) goals scored; 4) head-to-head result.
(H) Hosts

15 October 2009
13:00

South Africa	3–3	New Zealand
Wilson 2'; Fredericks 19'; Marescia 34'	Report	Sharland 17', 60'; Eshuis 66'

Umpires:
Julie Ashton-Lucy (AUS)
Carol Metchette (IRL)

15 October 2009
17:00

Spain	0–0	Japan
	Report

Umpires:
Soledad Iparraguirre (ARG)
Claire Adenot (FRA)

17 October 2009
13:00

South Africa	1–0	Spain
Taylor 47'	Report

Umpires:
Kelly Hudson (NZL)
Julie Ashton-Lucy (AUS)

17 October 2009
15:00

New Zealand	0–1	Japan
	Report	Nagayama 68'

Umpires:
Soledad Iparraguirre (ARG)
Carol Metchette (IRL)

==== Pool D ====
Pos	Team	Pld	W	D	L	GF	GA	GD	Pts
1	Italy	2	1	1	0	3	2	+1	4
2	Chile	2	0	2	0	1	1	0	2
3	Azerbaijan	2	0	1	1	1	2	−1	1

Source: FIH
Rules for classification: 1) points; 2) goal difference; 3) goals scored; 4) head-to-head result.

15 October 2009
15:00

Italy	1–1	Chile
Singh 35'	Report	D. Caram 68'

Umpires:
Irene Clelland (SCO)
Kelly Hudson (NZL)

17 October 2009
11:00

Azerbaijan	1–2	Italy
M. Aliyeva 68'	Report	Quaranta 30'; Zucca 66'

Umpires:
Michelle Joubert (RSA)
Frances Block (ENG)

=== Classification matches ===
==== Fifth and sixth place ====
18 October 2009
11:00

Italy	3–0	Chile
Franco 39', 60'; Singh 66'	Report

Umpires:
Michelle Joubert (RSA)
Claire Adenot (FRA)

==== Third and fourth place ====
18 October 2009
13:30

Japan	1–0	Spain
Komazawa 67'	Report

Umpires:
Carol Metchette (IRL)
Frances Block (ENG)

==== Final ====
18 October 2009
16:00

South Africa	1–2	New Zealand
Woods 64'	Report	Punt 17'; Eshuis 31'

Umpires:
Julie Ashton-Lucy (AUS)
Soledad Iparraguirre (ARG)

== Awards ==
Player of the Tournament	Top Goalscorers	Goalkeeper of the Tournament	Fair Play
(New Zealand) Gemma Flynn	(New Zealand) Clarissa Eshuis (South Africa) Farah Fredericks	(South Africa) Mariette Rix	South Africa

== Statistics ==
=== Final standings ===
Pos	Team	Pld	W	D	L	GF	GA	GD	Pts	Qualification
1st place, gold medalist(s)	New Zealand	5	3	1	1	12	7	+5	10	Qualified for FIH Champions Trophy
2nd place, silver medalist(s)	South Africa (H)	6	4	1	1	13	7	+6	13	
3rd place, bronze medalist(s)	Japan	6	4	1	1	10	4	+6	13	
4	Spain	5	1	1	3	4	6	−2	4	
5	Italy	5	2	1	2	9	10	−1	7	Relegated to FIH Champions Challenge II
6	Chile	5	0	2	3	1	6	−5	2	Relegated to FIH Champions Challenge II
7	Azerbaijan	4	0	1	3	1	10	−9	1	Relegated to FIH Champions Challenge II

Source: FIH
(H) Hosts

=== Goalscorers ===
There were 50 goals scored in 18 matches, for an average of 2.78 goals per match.

4 goals

- (New Zealand) Clarissa Eshuis
- (South Africa) Farah Fredericks

3 goals

- (New Zealand) Anita Punt
- (New Zealand) Kayla Sharland

2 goals

- (Italy) Francesca Faustini
- (Italy) Julieta Franco
- (Italy) Jasbeer Singh
- (Japan) Mazuki Arai
- (Japan) Rika Komazawa
- (Japan) Kana Nagayama
- (South Africa) Kathleen Taylor
- (South Africa) Jennifer Wilson
- (South Africa) Kate Woods
- (Spain) Glòria Comerma

1 goal

- (Azerbaijan) Marina Aliyeva
- (Chile) Daniela Caram
- (Italy) Elisabetta Pacella
- (Italy) Valentina Quaranta
- (Italy) Francesca Zucca
- (Japan) Sachimi Iwao
- (Japan) Ai Murakami
- (Japan) Mie Nakashima
- (Japan) Aki Yamada
- (New Zealand) Katie Glynn
- (New Zealand) Samantha Harrison
- (South Africa) Tarryn Bright
- (South Africa) Marsha Marescia
- (South Africa) Shelley Russell
- (Spain) Silvia Muñoz
- (Spain) Olalla Piñeiro

Source: FIH
