= Hockey at the 2010 Commonwealth Games – Women's tournament =

2010 Commonwealth Games–Women's hockey
Tournament details
- Host country: India
- City: New Delhi
- Dates: 4–13 October
- Teams: 10
- Venue: Dhyan Chand National Stadium

Final positions
- Champions: Australia (3rd title)
- Runner-up: New Zealand
- Third place: England

Tournament statistics
- Matches played: 27
- Goals scored: 117 (4.33 per match)
- Top scorer: (South Africa) Pietie Coetzee (6 goals)

The Women's field hockey event for the 2010 Commonwealth Games was held at the Dhyan Chand National Stadium from 4–13 October 2010. The Gold medal was won by Australia, who defeated New Zealand 4–2 on penalty strokes after the match had finished 2–2. England won the bronze medal by defeating South Africa 1–0.

== Umpires ==
Twelve umpires for the women's event were appointed by the International Hockey Federation.

- Gillian Batey (CAN)
- Irene Clelland (SCO)
- Frances Block (ENG)
- Elena Eskina (RUS)
- Nor Piza Hassan (MAS)
- Kelly Hudson (NZL)
- Michelle Joubert (RSA)
- Irene Presenqui (ARG)
- Anupama Puchimanda (IND)
- Chieko Soma (JPN)
- Melissa Trivic (AUS)
- Dino Willox (WAL)

== Results ==
=== Preliminary round ===
==== Pool A ====
Pos	Team	Pld	W	D	L	GF	GA	GD	Pts	Qualification
1	Australia	4	3	1	0	19	4	+15	10	Semi-finals
2	South Africa	4	2	1	1	16	5	+11	7	Semi-finals
3	India	4	2	1	1	12	4	+8	7	
4	Scotland	4	1	1	2	10	9	+1	4	
5	Trinidad and Tobago	4	0	0	4	1	36	−35	0	

Source: The CGF
Rules for classification: 1) points; 2) goal difference; 3) goals scored; 4) head-to-head result.

4 October 2010
13:00

South Africa	12–0	Trinidad and Tobago
Coetzee 2', 10', 26', 63'; George 39'; Wilson 42', 47'; Chamberlain 43', 68', 70'; Taylor 44'; Fredericks 62'	Report

Umpires:
Irene Clelland (SCO)
Gillian Batey (CAN)

4 October 2010
18:00

India	1–1	Scotland
Handa 45'	Report	Cram 3'

Umpires:
Michelle Joubert (RSA)
Chieko Soma (JPN)

5 October 2010
13:00

Australia	11–0	Trinidad and Tobago
Eastham 14'; Hurtz 19', 48', 63'; Blyth 27'; Liddelow 30'; Arrold 37'; Rivers 41', 46'; Taylor 50'; Nelson 60'	Report

Umpires:
Elena Eskina (RUS)
Anupama Puchimanda (IND)

5 October 2010
21:00

South Africa	2–1	Scotland
Madsen 19'; Coetzee 42'	Report	Bell 49'

Umpires:
Chieko Soma (JPN)
Frances Block (ENG)

6 October 2010
13:30

Australia	2–1	India
Liddelow 11'; Rivers 59'	Report	Rampal 69'

Umpires:
Kelly Hudson (NZL)
Frances Block (ENG)

7 October 2010
11:00

Scotland	6–1	Trinidad and Tobago
Clement 4'; Kidd 16', 41'; Bell 45', 50'; Cram 67'	Report	Williams 69'

Umpires:
Nor Piza Hassan (MAS)
Dino Willox (WAL)

8 October 2010
08:30

Australia	1–1	South Africa
Hurtz 8'	Report	Damons 31'

Umpires:
Chieko Soma (JPN)
Frances Block (ENG)

8 October 2010
10:30

India	7–0	Trinidad and Tobago
S. Kaur 8', 30', 37', 54'; Rani 14'; Rampal 34'; Handa 68'	Report

Umpires:
Gillian Batey (CAN)
Nor Piza Hassan (MAS)

9 October 2010
13:30

Australia	5–2	Scotland
Hollywood 3'; Rivers 12'; Arrold 30', 56'; Nelson 43'	Report	Judge 50'; Robertson 54'

Umpires:
Chieko Soma (JPN)
Nor Piza Hassan (MAS)

9 October 2010
21:00

South Africa	1–3	India
Coetzee 45'	Report	Thakur 11', 21'; S. Kaur 35'

Umpires:
Elena Eskina (RUS)
Irene Presenqui (ARG)

==== Pool B ====
Pos	Team	Pld	W	D	L	GF	GA	GD	Pts	Qualification
1	New Zealand	4	4	0	0	17	3	+14	12	Semi-finals
2	England	4	3	0	1	12	6	+6	9	Semi-finals
3	Canada	4	1	0	3	6	11	−5	3	
4	Wales	4	1	0	3	5	12	−7	3	
5	Malaysia	4	1	0	3	4	12	−8	3	

Source: The CGF
Rules for classification: 1) points; 2) goal difference; 3) goals scored; 4) head-to-head result.

4 October 2010
10:30

New Zealand	5–1	Wales
Glynn 18'; Flynn 37'; Thorpe 51', 59'; Eshuis 68'	Report	Welsford 33'

Umpires:
Irene Presenqui (ARG)
Elena Eskina (RUS)

4 October 2010
16:00

Canada	2–3	Malaysia
Roemer 56'; Kozniuk 59'	Report	Norbaini 18', 56'; Norfaraha 49'

Umpires:
Kelly Hudson (NZL)
Melissa Trivic (AUS)

5 October 2010
08:30

England	4–1	Wales
Cullen 10', 20', 41'; Craddock 49'	Report	Thomas 69'

Umpires:
Irene Presenqui (ARG)
Nor Piza Hassan (MAS)

5 October 2010
16:00

New Zealand	5–0	Malaysia
Punt 33'; Sharland 35+'; Thorpe 42'; C. Harrison 45'; S. Harrison 60'	Report

Umpires:
Michelle Joubert (RSA)
Dino Willox (WAL)

6 October 2010
11:00

England	4–1	Canada
Rogers 19'; Danson 39'; Craddock 48'; Cullen 68'	Report	Roemer 4'

Umpires:
Irene Clelland (SCO)
Melissa Trivic (AUS)

7 October 2010
13:00

Malaysia	1–2	Wales
Nadia 39'	Report	Wilkinson 24'; Lowry 56'

Umpires:
Gillian Batey (CAN)
Anupama Puchimanda (IND)

8 October 2010
13:30

England	1–4	New Zealand
Ball 14'	Report	S. Harrison 25'; Glynn 35', 51', 54'

Umpires:
Michelle Joubert (RSA)
Irene Presenqui (ARG)

8 October 2010
18:30

Canada	2–1	Wales
Baker 68'; Pendleton 70'	Report	Batten 30'

Umpires:
Kelly Hudson (NZL)
Melissa Trivic (AUS)

9 October 2010
14:00

England	3–0	Malaysia
White 33'; Danson 40'; Twigg 46'	Report

Umpires:
Irene Clelland (SCO)
Michelle Joubert (RSA)

9 October 2010
16:30

New Zealand	3–1	Canada
Forgesson 36'; Michelsen 47'; Eshuis 69'	Report	Pendleton 41'

Umpires:
Frances Block (ENG)
Dino Willox (WAL)

=== Fifth to tenth place classification ===
==== Ninth and tenth place ====
11 October 2010
08:30

Trinidad and Tobago	2–1	Malaysia
Wynne 48'; Siu Butt 69'	Report	Sylvester Silin 57'

Umpires:
Anupama Puchimanda (IND)
Dino Willox (WAL)

==== Seventh and eighth place ====
11 October 2010
20:00

Scotland	1–1	Wales
Robertson 6'	Report	Thomas 9'
Penalties
Marshall (penalty shoot-out scored); Bunce (penalty shoot-out scored); Forrest (penalty shoot-out scored)	3–1	(penalty shoot-out scored) Wilkinson; (penalty shoot-out missed) Mitchell; (penalty shoot-out missed) Lowry; (penalty shoot-out missed) Welsford

Umpires:
Nor Piza Hassan (MAS)
Melissa Trivic (AUS)

==== Fifth and sixth place ====
11 October 2010
13:30

India	3–0	Canada
Rani 18'; Thokchom 66'; Anjum 70'	Report

Umpires:
Kelly Hudson (NZL)
Irene Clelland (SCO)

=== First to fourth place classification ===
Semi-finals
11 October 2010
Australia	1
England	0
11 October 2010
New Zealand	1
South Africa	0

Final
13 October 2010
Australia (p.)	2 (4)
New Zealand	2 (2)
Third place
13 October 2010
England	1
South Africa	0

==== Semifinals ====
11 October 2010
11:00

Australia	1–0	England
Blyth 38'	Report

Umpires:
Michelle Joubert (RSA)
Chieko Soma (JPN)

11 October 2010
17:30

New Zealand	1–0	South Africa
Eshuis 53'	Report

Umpires:
Irene Presenqui (ARG)
Elena Eskina (RUS)

==== Bronze medal match ====
13 October 2010
10:30

England	1–0	South Africa
Twigg 13'	Report

Umpires:
Irene Presenqui (ARG)
Elena Eskina (RUS)

==== Gold medal match ====
13 October 2010
13:00

Australia	2–2 (a.e.t.)	New Zealand
Arrold 9'; Nelson 59'	Report	S. Harrison 48'; Eshuis 70'
Penalties
Nelson (penalty shoot-out scored); Rivers (penalty shoot-out scored); Blyth (penalty shoot-out missed); Eastham (penalty shoot-out scored); Arrold (penalty shoot-out scored)	4–2	(penalty shoot-out missed) Glynn; (penalty shoot-out missed) Forgesson; (penalty shoot-out scored) Michelsen; (penalty shoot-out scored) Sharland

Umpires:
Chieko Soma (JPN)
Frances Block (ENG)

== Statistics ==
=== Goalscorers ===
6 Goals

- (South Africa) Pietie Coetzee

5 Goals

- (India) Surinder Kaur

4 Goals

- (Australia) Nicole Arrold
- (Australia) Emily Hurtz
- (Australia) Megan Rivers
- (England) Crista Cullen
- (New Zealand) Clarissa Eshuis
- (New Zealand) Katie Glynn

3 Goals

- (Australia) Ashleigh Nelson
- (New Zealand) Samantha Harrison
- (New Zealand) Anna Thorpe
- (Scotland) Alison Bell
- (South Africa) Dirkie Chamberlain

2 Goals

- (Australia) Madonna Blyth
- (Australia) Shelly Liddelow
- (Canada) Robyn Pendleton
- (Canada) Diana Roemer
- (England) Charlotte Craddock
- (England) Alex Danson
- (England) Georgie Twigg
- (India) Jasjeet Kaur Handa
- (India) Rani Rampal
- (India) Ritu Rani
- (India) Deepika Thakur
- (Malaysia) Norbaini Hashim
- (Scotland) Holly Cram
- (Scotland) Nikki Kidd
- (Scotland) Ailsa Robertson
- (South Africa) Jennifer Wilson
- (Wales) Sarah Thomas

1 Goal

- (Australia) Casey Eastham
- (Australia) Kate Hollywood
- (Australia) Jayde Taylor
- (Canada) Katie Baker
- (Canada) Anna Kozniuk
- (England) Chloe Rogers
- (England) Ashleigh Ball
- (England) Nicola White
- (India) Saba Anjum
- (India) Chanchan Devi Thokchom
- (Malaysia) Norfaraha Hashim
- (Malaysia) Nadia Abdul Rahman
- (Malaysia) Fazilla Sylvester Silin
- (New Zealand) Gemma Flynn
- (New Zealand) Krystal Forgesson
- (New Zealand) Charlotte Harrison
- (New Zealand) Stacey Michelsen
- (New Zealand) Anita Punt
- (New Zealand) Kayla Sharland
- (Scotland) Linda Clement
- (Scotland) Samantha Judge
- (South Africa) Sulette Damons
- (South Africa) Farah Fredericks
- (South Africa) Lesle-Ann George
- (South Africa) Kelly Madsen
- (South Africa) Kathleen Taylor
- (Trinidad and Tobago) Stacey-Ann Siu Butt
- (Trinidad and Tobago) Charlene Williams
- (Trinidad and Tobago) Blair Wynne
- (Wales) Emma Batten
- (Wales) Claire Lowry
- (Wales) Abigail Welsford
- (Wales) Leah Wilkinson

=== Final standings ===
As per statistical convention in field hockey, matches decided in extra time are counted as wins and losses, while matches decided by penalty shoot-outs are counted as draws.

Pos	Team	Pld	W	D	L	GF	GA	GD	Pts	Final Standings
1st place, gold medalist(s)	Australia	6	4	2	0	22	6	+16	14	Gold Medal
2nd place, silver medalist(s)	New Zealand	6	5	1	0	20	5	+15	16	Silver Medal
3rd place, bronze medalist(s)	England	6	4	0	2	13	7	+6	12	Bronze Medal
4	South Africa	6	2	1	3	16	7	+9	7	Fourth place
5	India	5	3	1	1	15	4	+11	10	Fifth place
6	Canada	5	1	0	4	6	14	−8	3	Sixth place
7	Scotland	5	1	2	2	11	10	+1	5	Seventh place
8	Wales	5	1	1	3	6	13	−7	4	Eighth place
9	Trinidad and Tobago	5	1	0	4	3	37	−34	3	Ninth place
10	Malaysia	5	1	0	4	5	14	−9	3	Tenth place

Source: The CGF
