= 2003 Women's Hockey Champions Trophy =

Field hockey tournament

Tournament details
- Host country: Australia
- City: Sydney
- Teams: 6
- Venue: Sydney Olympic Park Hockey Centre

Final positions
- Champions: Australia (6th title)
- Runner-up: China
- Third place: Netherlands

Tournament statistics
- Matches played: 18
- Goals scored: 66 (3.67 per match)
- Top scorer: (Australia) Katrina Powell (4 goals)
- Best player: (Argentina) Luciana Aymar

The 2003 Women's Hockey Champions Trophy was the 11th edition of the Hockey Champions Trophy for women. It was held from 29 November to 7 December 2003 in Sydney, Australia.

Australia won the tournament for a record sixth time after defeating China 3–2 in the final.

== Teams ==
The participating teams were determined by International Hockey Federation (FIH):

- China (Defending champions)
- Argentina (Champions of 2002 World Cup)
- Australia (Host nation and champions of 2000 Summer Olympics)
- Netherlands (Second in 2002 World Cup)
- England (Fifth in 2002 World Cup)
- South Korea (Sixth in 2002 World Cup)

== Squads ==
Argentina

Head Coach: Gabriel Minadeo

1. Mariela Antoniska (GK)
3. Magdalena Aicega (c)
4. María Paz Ferrari
5. Marina di Giacomo
6. Ayelén Stepnik
7. Alejandra Gulla
8. Luciana Aymar
10. Soledad García
12. Mariana González Oliva
14. Mercedes Margalot
15. María de la Paz Hernández
17. Maria Inés Parodi
18. Paola Vukojicic (GK)
19. Mariné Russo
21. Inés Arrondo
23. Natali Doreski
24. Claudia Burkart
28. Macarena Rodríguez
Australia

Head Coach: David Bell

2. Louise Dobson
3. Karen Smith
5. Ngaire Smith
6. Megan Rivers
7. Peta Gallagher
10. Bianca Netzler
11. Emily Halliday
13. Wendy Alcorn
16. Cindy Morgan (GK)
17. Rachel Imison (GK)
20. Carmel Bakurski
22. Katie Allen
24. Angie Skirving
25. Melanie Twitt
27. Suzie Faulkner
28. Julie Towers
30. Sarah Taylor
31. Katrina Powell (c)
China

Head Coach: Kim Chang-back

1. Nie Yali (GK)
2. Huang Xuejiao
3. Chen Zhaoxia
4. Ma Yibo
5. Cheng Hui
7. Huang Junxia
8. Fu Baorong
9. Li Shuang
10. Gao Lihua
11. Tang Chunling
12. Zhou Wanfeng (c)
13. Ren Ye
15. Hou Xiaolan
17. Qiu Yingling
19. Chen Qiuqi
26. Chen Qunqing
29. Zhang Yimeng (GK)
England

Head Coach: Bobby Crutchley

1. Carolyn Reid (GK)
2. Hilary Rose (GK)
3. Jennie Bimson
4. Jane Smith
5. Denise Marston-Smith
6. Melanie Clewlow
7. Purdy Miller
8. Anna Bennett
9. Mandy Nicholson
10. Lucilla Wright
11. Kate Walsh
12. Frances Houslop
14. Rachel Walker
16. Leisa King
17. Sarah Blanks
19. Joanne Ellis
20. Fiona Greenham
23. Crista Cullen
South Korea

Head Coach: Lim Heung-sin

1. Park Yong-sook (GK)
2. Kim Yun-mi
3. Lee Jin-hee
4. Yoo Hee-joo
5. Lee Seon-ok
7. Han Sung-mi
8. Lee Mi-seong
9. Nam Jin-a
11. Kim Seong-eun (c)
12. Ko Kwang-min
14. Park Seon-mi
16. Lim Ju-young (GK)
17. Kang Bo-kyung
18. Park Jeong-sook
19. Young Kang-na
20. Kim Mi-seon
21. Park Jin-suk
22. Kim Bo-mi
Netherlands

Head Coach: Marc Lammers

1. Clarinda Sinnige (GK)
2. Eveline de Haan (GK)
3. Macha van der Vaart
5. Jiske Snoeks
6. Maartje Scheepstra
7. Miek van Geenhuizen
9. Sylvia Karres
10. Mijntje Donners
11. Ageeth Boomgaardt
12. Sabine Romkes
13. Minke Smabers
15. Janneke Schopman
16. Chantal de Bruijn
17. Eefke Mulder
20. Wieke Dijkstra
21. Lieve van Kessel
23. Kim Lammers
24. Femke Kooijman

== Umpires ==
Below are the 9 umpires appointed by the International Hockey Federation:

- Julie Ashton-Lucy (AUS)
- Lyn Farrell (NZL)
- Sarah Garnett (NZL)
- Soledad Iparraguirre (ARG)
- Jane Nockolds (ENG)
- Renate Peters (GER)
- Cecilia Valenzuela (CHI)
- Minka Woolley (AUS)
- Kazuko Yasueda (JPN)

== Results ==
All times are Eastern Daylight Time (UTC+11:00)

=== Pool ===
| Pos | Team | Pld | W | D | L | GF | GA | GD | Pts | Qualification |
|---|---|---|---|---|---|---|---|---|---|---|
| 1 | China | 5 | 3 | 2 | 0 | 9 | 5 | +4 | 11 | Final |
| 2 | Australia (H) | 5 | 3 | 1 | 1 | 13 | 3 | +10 | 10 | Final |
| 3 | Argentina | 5 | 2 | 3 | 0 | 12 | 8 | +4 | 9 | |
| 4 | Netherlands | 5 | 1 | 1 | 3 | 8 | 10 | −2 | 4 | |
| 5 | England | 5 | 1 | 1 | 3 | 4 | 11 | −7 | 4 | |
| 6 | South Korea | 5 | 1 | 0 | 4 | 6 | 15 | −9 | 3 | |

Rules for classification: 1) Points; 2) Goal difference; 3) Goals scored; 4) Games won; 5) Head-to-head.
(H) Hosts

29 November 2003
11:00

| Argentina | 3–1 | South Korea |
|---|---|---|
| Aymar 21'; Aicega 39'; Gulla 69' | Report | Kim S. 19' |

Umpires:
Julie Ashton-Lucy (AUS)
Lyn Farrell (NZL)

29 November 2003
13:00

| China | 1–0 | Netherlands |
|---|---|---|
| Gao 13' | Report |

Umpires:
Jane Nockolds (ENG)
Minka Woolley (AUS)

29 November 2003
15:00

| Australia | 5–0 | England |
|---|---|---|
| Skirving 19'; Powell 37', 62'; Netzler 62'; Faulkner 65' | Report |

Umpires:
Soledad Iparraguirre (ARG)
Kazuko Yasueda (JPN)

30 November 2003
13:00

| China | 3–3 | Argentina |
|---|---|---|
| Tang 5'; Fu 50'; Ma 63' | Report | Aymar 42'; Aicega 60'; García 67' |

Umpires:
Renate Peters (GER)
Kazuko Yasueda (JPN)

30 November 2003
15:00

| Australia | 2–1 | Netherlands |
|---|---|---|
| Bakurski 2'; Powell 42' | Report | Schopman 49' |

Umpires:
Sarah Garnett (NZL)
Soledad Iparraguirre (ARG)

30 November 2003
17:00

| England | 1–2 | South Korea |
|---|---|---|
| Wright 36' | Report | Kim M. 23', 69' |

Umpires:
Cecilia Valenzuela (CHI)
Minka Woolley (AUS)

2 December 2003
16:00

| South Korea | 3–4 | Netherlands |
|---|---|---|
| Kim S. 32'; Ko 38'; Lee M. 44' | Report | Boomgaardt 7'; Karres 38'; De Bruijn 52'; Van der Vaart 62' |

Umpires:
Julie Ashton-Lucy (AUS)
Renate Peters (GER)

2 December 2003
18:00

| Argentina | 2–0 | England |
|---|---|---|
| Aymar 39'; Di Giacomo 45' | Report |

Umpires:
Sarah Garnett (NZL)
Cecilia Valenzuela (CHI)

2 December 2003
20:00

| Australia | 0–1 | China |
|---|---|---|
| | Report | Fu 22' |

Umpires:
Lyn Farrell (NZL)
Jane Nockolds (ENG)

4 December 2003
16:00

| China | 2–0 | South Korea |
|---|---|---|
| Tang 25'; Chen Qu. 57' | Report |

Umpires:
Julie Ashton-Lucy (AUS)
Sarah Garnett (NZL)

4 December 2003
18:00

| England | 1–0 | Netherlands |
|---|---|---|
| Walsh 67' | Report |

Umpires:
Soledad Iparraguirre (ARG)
Minka Woolley (AUS)

4 December 2003
20:00

| Australia | 1–1 | Argentina |
|---|---|---|
| Gallagher 67' | Report | García 68' |

Umpires:
Lyn Farrell (NZL)
Renate Peters (GER)

6 December 2003
11:00

| England | 2–2 | China |
|---|---|---|
| Bennett 8', 45' | Report | Chen Qi. 23'; Tang 27' |

Umpires:
Renate Peters (GER)
Sarah Garnett (NZL)

6 December 2003
13:00

| Netherlands | 3–3 | Argentina |
|---|---|---|
| Boomgaardt 11'; Donners 64'; Mulder 67' | Report | García 9'; Di Giacomo 55'; Margalot 69' |

Umpires:
Julie Ashton-Lucy (AUS)
Lyn Farrell (NZL)

6 December 2003
15:00

| Australia | 5–0 | South Korea |
|---|---|---|
| Powell 25'; Skirving 28'; Dobson 29'; Towers 37'; Alcorn 67' | Report |

Umpires:
Soledad Iparraguirre (ARG)
Jane Nockolds (ENG)

=== Classification ===
==== Fifth and sixth place ====
7 December 2003
10:00

| England | 2–2 (a.e.t.) | South Korea |
|---|---|---|
| Walker 12'; Walsh 66' | Report | Lee J. 9'; Nam 56' |
Penalties
| Smith (penalty shoot-out scored); King (penalty shoot-out scored); Walsh (penalty shoot-out scored); Walker (penalty shoot-out scored) | 4–2 | (penalty shoot-out scored) Lee J. (penalty shoot-out scored) Lee S. (penalty shoot-out missed) Kim Y. (penalty shoot-out missed) Han |

Umpires:
Minka Woolley (AUS)
Julie Ashton-Lucy (AUS)

==== Third and fourth place ====
7 December 2003
12:30

| Argentina | 2–3 | Netherlands |
|---|---|---|
| Hernández 2'; Margalot 53' | Report | Schopman 16'; Mulder 46'; Smabers 53' |

Umpires:
Renate Peters (GER)
Kazuko Yasueda (JPN)

==== Final ====
7 December 2003
15:00

| China | 2–3 | Australia |
|---|---|---|
| Fu 43'; Li S. 64' | Report | Towers 1'; Faulkner 14'; Gallagher 16' |

Umpires:
Soledad Iparraguirre (ARG)
Lyn Farrell (NZL)

== Awards ==
| Top Goalscorer | Player of the Tournament |
|---|---|
| (Australia) Katrina Powell | (Argentina) Luciana Aymar |

== Statistics ==
=== Final standings ===
1. Australia
2. China
3. Netherlands
4. Argentina
5. England
6. South Korea

=== Goalscorers ===
There were 66 goals scored in 18 matches, for an average of 3.67 goals per match.

4 goals

- (Australia) Katrina Powell

3 goals

- (Argentina) Luciana Aymar
- (Argentina) Soledad García
- (China) Fu Baorong
- (China) Tang Chunling

2 goals

- (Argentina) Magdalena Aicega
- (Argentina) Marina di Giacomo
- (Argentina) Mercedes Margalot
- (Australia) Suzie Faulkner
- (Australia) Peta Gallagher
- (Australia) Angie Skirving
- (Australia) Julie Towers
- (England) Anna Bennett
- (England) Kate Walsh
- (South Korea) Kim Mi-seon
- (South Korea) Kim Seong-eun
- (Netherlands) Ageeth Boomgaardt
- (Netherlands) Eefke Mulder
- (Netherlands) Janneke Schopman

1 goal

- (Argentina) María de la Paz Hernández
- (Argentina) Alejandra Gulla
- (Australia) Wendy Alcorn
- (Australia) Carmel Bakurski
- (Australia) Louise Dobson
- (Australia) Bianca Netzler
- (China) Chen Qiuqi
- (China) Chen Qunqing
- (China) Gao Lihua
- (China) Li Shuang
- (China) Ma Yibo
- (England) Rachel Walker
- (England) Lucilla Wright
- (South Korea) Ko Kwang-min
- (South Korea) Lee Jin-hee
- (South Korea) Lee Mi-seong
- (South Korea) Nam Jin-a
- (Netherlands) Chantal de Bruijn
- (Netherlands) Mijntje Donners
- (Netherlands) Sylvia Karres
- (Netherlands) Minke Smabers
- (Netherlands) Macha van der Vaart

Source: FIH
