= Ko Kwang-min =

Ko Kwang-min may refer to:

- Ko Kwang-min (field hockey)
- Ko Kwang-min (footballer)

== See also ==
- Koo Kwang-ming, Taiwanese statesman, businessman and independence activist
