= Rhona Simpson =

British field hockey player

Rhona Isabel Simpson (born 14 July 1972 in Paisley, Renfrewshire) is a Scottish field hockey player who has played for her country over 280 times. By 2014 she was Scotland’s most-capped hockey player and top goal scorer.

Simpson started playing hockey at the age of 12 as part of the curriculum at her school, Wellington School, Ayr. She went on to be selected for the South West District Team.

She twice represented Great Britain at the Summer Olympics (1996 and 2000). Simpson became top scorer at the 2006 Women's Hockey World Cup Qualifier in Rome, Italy, alongside Kaori Chiba (Japan), Tomomi Komori (Japan) and Maryna Vynohradova (Ukraine), scoring six goals.

She represented Scotland at the Kuala Lumpur 1998, Manchester 2002 and Melbourne 2006 Commonwealth Games.

She studied at Heriot-Watt University and subsequently worked as a PE teacher.
