= 2008 Women's Hockey Setanta Sports Trophy =

Setanta Sports Trophy
Tournament details
- Host country: (Republic of Ireland) Ireland
- City: Dublin
- Teams: 4 (from 2 confederations)
- Venue: University College Dublin

Final positions
- Champions: Great Britain (1st title)
- Runner-up: Germany
- Third place: South Africa

Tournament statistics
- Matches played: 8
- Goals scored: 24 (3 per match)
- Top scorer: 4 Players (see list below) (2 goals)
- Best player: (Germany) Maike Stöckel

The 2008 Women's Hockey Setanta Sports Trophy was the second edition of the Setanta Sports Trophy, a women's field hockey tournament. It was held in Dublin, Ireland, from June 11 to 15, 2008, and featured four of the top nations in women's field hockey.

The tournament was held simultaneously with the men's competition.

== Competition format ==
The tournament featured the national teams of Germany, Great Britain, South Africa, and the hosts, Ireland, competing in a round-robin format, with each team playing each other once. Three points were awarded for a win, one for a draw, and none for a loss.

Country	September 2007 FIH Ranking	Best World Cup finish	Best Olympic Games finish
Germany	3	Champions (1976, 1981)	Champions (2004)
Great Britain	10	Fourth Place (1990)	Third Place (1992)
Ireland	14	Eleventh Place (1994)	Never qualified.
South Africa	12	Seventh place (1998)	Ninth place (2004)

== Officials ==
The following umpires were appointed by the International Hockey Federation to officiate the tournament:

- Jean Duncan (GBR)
- Amy Hassick (USA)
- Philette de Jager (RSA)
- Carol Metchette (IRE)
- Petra Müller (GER)

== Results ==
All times are local (Irish Standard Time).

=== Preliminary round ===
Pos	Team	Pld	W	D	L	GF	GA	GD	Pts	Qualification
1	Germany	3	3	0	0	5	1	+4	9	Advanced to Final
2	Great Britain	3	2	0	1	7	2	+5	6	Advanced to Final
3	South Africa	3	1	0	2	3	6	−3	3	
4	Ireland (H)	3	0	0	3	1	7	−6	0	

Source: Deutscher Hockey-Bund
Rules for classification: 1) points; 2) goal difference; 3) goals scored; 4) head-to-head result.
(H) Hosts

==== Fixtures ====
11 February 2008
14:00

Great Britain	1–2	Germany
Gilbert 36'	Report	Keller 27'; Rodewald 44'

Umpires:
Carol Metchette (IRE)
Amy Hassick (USA)

11 February 2008
16:00

Ireland	1–3	South Africa
Cregan 67'	Report	Hector 4'; Du Buisson 20', 51'

Umpires:
Petra Müller (GER)
Jean Duncan (GBR)

12 February 2008
14:00

Great Britain	3–0	South Africa
Clewlow 6'; Danson 28', 55'	Report

Umpires:
Petra Müller (GER)
Carol Metchette (IRE)

12 February 2008
18:00

Germany	1–0	Ireland
Kühn 14'	Report

Umpires:
Philette de Jager (RSA)
Amy Hassick (USA)

14 February 2008
13:00

Germany	2–0	South Africa
Stöckel 57'; Hoyer 66'	Report

Umpires:
Amy Hassick (USA)
Jean Duncan (GBR)

14 February 2008
13:00

Ireland	0–3	Great Britain
	Report	Rogers 23'; Cullen 35'; Craddock 68'

Umpires:
Philette de Jager (RSA)
Petra Müller (GER)

=== Classification round ===
==== Third and fourth place ====
15 February 2008
09:00

South Africa	2–1	Ireland
Marescia 48'; Bright 57'	Report	Jacob 35'

Umpires:
Jean Duncan (GBR)
Amy Hassick (USA)

==== Final ====
15 February 2008
11:25

Germany	1–4	Great Britain
Kühn 66'	Report	Thomas 7'; Wright 31'; Walker 44'; Cullen 57'

Umpires:
Carol Metchette (IRE)
Philette de Jager (RSA)

== Statistics ==
=== Final standings ===
Pos	Team	Pld	W	D	L	GF	GA	GD	Pts	Status
1st place, gold medalist(s)	Great Britain	4	3	0	1	11	3	+8	9	Tournament Champion
2nd place, silver medalist(s)	Germany	4	3	0	1	6	5	+1	9	
3rd place, bronze medalist(s)	South Africa	4	2	0	2	5	7	−2	6	
4	Ireland (H)	4	0	0	4	2	9	−7	0	

Source: Deutscher Hockey-Bund
(H) Hosts

=== Goalscorers ===
There were 24 goals scored in 8 matches, for an average of 3 goals per match.

2 goals

- (Germany) Anke Kühn
- (United Kingdom) Crista Cullen
- (United Kingdom) Alexandra Danson
- (South Africa) Henriette du Buisson

1 goal

- (Germany) Kerstin Hoyer
- (Germany) Natascha Keller
- (Germany) Marion Rodewald
- (Germany) Maike Stöckel
- (United Kingdom) Melanie Clewlow
- (United Kingdom) Charlotte Craddock
- (United Kingdom) Susannah Gilbert
- (United Kingdom) Chloe Rogers
- (United Kingdom) Sarah Thomas
- (United Kingdom) Rachel Walker
- (United Kingdom) Lucilla Wright
- (Ireland) Eimar Cregan
- (Ireland) Lisa Jacob
- (South Africa) Tarryn Bright
- (South Africa) Kate Hector
- (South Africa) Marsha Marescia
