= Stacey Carr =

New Zealand field hockey player

Personal information
- Born: 6 April 1984 (age 42) Ashburton, New Zealand

Sport
- Sport: Field hockey
Medal record
Women's field hockey
Representing New Zealand
Commonwealth Games
Silver medal – second place	2010 Delhi	Team competition
Champions Challenge
Gold medal – first place	2005 Virginia Beach	Team
Gold medal – first place	2009 Cape Town	Team

Stacey Carr (born 6 April 1984 in Ashburton) is a field hockey midfielder from New Zealand, who made her international debut for the national team in 2003 at a three nations tournament in Japan. Carr was a member of the team that finished seventh at the 2004 Summer Olympics in Athens, Greece.

== International senior competitions ==
- 2004 – Olympic Qualifying Tournament, Auckland
- 2004 – Summer Olympics, Athens
- 2004 – Champions Trophy, Rosario
- 2005 – Champions Challenge, Virginia Beach
- 2006 – Commonwealth Games, Melbourne
- 2006 – World Cup Qualifier, Rome
- 2006 – Champions Trophy, Amstelveen
- 2008 – Olympic Games, Beijing
