= 2007 Women's Hockey Asia Cup =

International field hockey tournament

Tournament details
- Host country: Hong Kong
- City: Hong Kong
- Teams: 9 (from 1 confederation)
- Venue(s): Kings Park Hockey Ground

Final positions
- Champions: Japan (1st title)
- Runner-up: South Korea
- Third place: China

Tournament statistics
- Matches played: 24
- Goals scored: 183 (7.63 per match)

The 2007 Women's Hockey Asia Cup was the sixth tournament of the Women's Hockey Asia Cup. It was held in Hong Kong from 1 September to 9 September 2007.

Japan defeated South Korea to win the title. While China took third place after beating India.

== Pools ==
All times are Hong Kong Time (UTC +8).

=== Pool A ===
Team	Pts	Pld	W	D	L	GF	GA	GD
China	12	4	4	0	0	41	3	+38
India	9	4	3	0	1	40	4	+36
Malaysia	6	4	2	0	2	13	13	0
Thailand	3	4	1	0	3	2	39	−37
Singapore	0	4	0	0	4	1	38	−37

1 September 2007
14:30

China	7 – 1	Malaysia
Tang Chunling 8', 11'; Song Qingling 50', 61'; Ma Yibo 56', 57'; Xing Qlan 63'		Hashim 47'

Umpires:
Lisa Roach (Australia)
Sachiko Fukuda (Japan)

1 September 2007
20:00

Singapore	1 – 2	Thailand
Chua Xinni 14'		Ritngam 35'; Lewrungrot 43'

Umpires:
Corrine Cornelius
(South Africa)
Sunita Pant (India)

2 September 2007
18:00

Malaysia	0 – 6	India
		Ralte 4'; J. Kaur 15'; S. Kaur 32', 52', 60', 63'

Umpires:
Lisa Roach (Australia)
Qin Yuling (China)

2 September 2007
20:00

Singapore	0 – 15	China
		Li Hongxia 2', 7', 25', 56'; Tang Chunling 3', 48'; Song Qingling 14', 38', 46', 54'; Xing Qian 16', 45', 47'; Gao Lihua 42'; Ma Yibo 60'

Umpires:
Corrine Cornelius
(South Africa)
Yau Yuen Ki, Kitty (Hong Kong)

3 September 2007
18:00

India	16 – 0	Thailand
J. Kaur 5', 38'; Kharab 9', 44', 65'; S. Kaur 12', 22', 42', 52', 62'; Bala 33'; Anjum 39', 64'; Rani 55', 57'; R. Kaur 56'

Umpires:
Lisa Roach (Australia)
Lim Mi-sook (Korea)

4 September 2007
20:00

Malaysia	5 – 0	Singapore
Arumugam 4'; Silin 7'; Abdul Rahman 31'; Mokhtar 48'; Hashim 70'

Umpires:
Sachiko Fukuda (Japan)
Sunita Pant (India)

5 September 2007
16:00

Thailand	0 – 15	China
		Huang Junxia 1'; Zhou Wanfeng 3'; Song Qingling 4'; Gao Lihua 12', 61'; Xing Qian 25'; Ma Yibo 17', 42'; Tang Chunling 34', 38', 43'; Sun Zhen 52'; Li Hongxia 54', 64'; Chen Qiuqi 63'

Umpires:
Corrine Cornelius
(South Africa)
Lynn Norhana (Singapore)

5 September 2007
18:00

India	16 – 0	Singapore
Kharab 7', 19', 25', 54', 67'; S. Kaur 11', 23', 34'; J. Kaur 22', 68', 70'; Anjum 28', 41', 59'; Thakur 47'; Rani 49'

Umpires:
Yau Yuen Ki, Kitty (Hong Kong)
Qin Yuling (China)

6 September 2007
16:00

Thailand	0 – 7	Malaysia
		Othman 21' (2); Arumugam 6' (2); Abdul Rahman 48' (2); Silin (1)

6 September 2007
20:00

China	4 – 2	India
Li Hongxia 4'; Tang Chunling 33' (2); Zhou Wanfeng 47'		J. Kaur 7'; Anjum (1)

=== Pool B ===
Team	Pts	Pld	W	D	L	GF	GA	GD
South Korea	9	3	3	0	0	29	1	+28
Japan	6	3	2	0	1	27	4	+23
Hong Kong	3	3	1	0	2	2	33	−31
Chinese Taipei	0	3	0	0	3	1	21	−20

1 September 2007
18:00

Hong Kong	0 – 14	Japan
		Komazawa 4', 32', 42'; Morimoto 10', 41', 64'; Iwao 16', 17'; Ono 25'; Kimura 28', 48'; Komori 30', 62'; Tsukui 65'

Umpires:
Lin Miao (China)
Lim Mi-sook (Korea)

2 September 2007
16:00

Chinese Taipei	0 – 7	South Korea
		Cheon Seul-ki 4', 38', 41', 45', 69' (ps); Kim Jong-eun 15'; Kim Mi-seon 66'

Umpires:
Lin Miao (China)
Lynn Norhana (Singapore)

3 September 2007
20:00

South Korea	18 – 0	Hong Kong
Kim Jin-kyoung 3', 12', 23', 50'; Park Seon-mi 13'; Kim Jong-eun 18'; Park Mi-hyun 27', 47'; Kim Da-rae 30'; Cheon Seul-ki 33', 35', 37', 59', 63'; Han Hye-lyoung 38'; Kim Mi-seon 48'

Umpires:
Corrine Cornelius
(South Africa)
Annie Thomas (Malaysia)

4 September 2007
18:00

Chinese Taipei	0 – 12	Japan
		Miura 3', 18', 27', 44', 47'; Morimoto 16'; Komori 23', 61'; Kimura 33', 53'; Iwao 49'; Ono 53'

Umpires:
Lin Miao (China)
Nirmala Dagar (India)

5 September 2007
20:00

Hong Kong	2 – 1	Chinese Taipei
Lo I Ka 19'; Yip Ting Wai 26'		Lin Yi-Ching 68' (ps)

Umpires:
Lisa Roach (Australia)
Annie Thomas (Malaysia)

6 September 2007
18:00

Japan	1 – 4	South Korea
Miura 55'		Cheon Seul-ki 18'; Park Mi-hyun 34'; Kim Mi-seon; Kim Dae-rae 59'

== Fifth to eighth place classification ==
=== Crossover ===
8 September 2007
09:00

Malaysia	3 – 0	Chinese Taipei
Lambor 14'; Hashim 17'; Abdul Rahman 52'

Umpires:
Sunita Pant (India)
Lynn Norhana (Singapore)

8 September 2007
11:30

Hong Kong	0 – 1	Thailand
		Lewrungrot 55'

Umpires:
Sachiko Fukuda (Japan)
Nirmala Dagar (India)

=== Seventh and eighth place ===
9 September 2007
09:30

Chinese Taipei	1 – 0	Hong Kong
Lin Yi-Ching 67'

=== Fifth and sixth place ===
9 September 2007
12:00

Malaysia	3 – 1	Thailand
Abdul Rahman 25', 66'; Arumugam 28'		Kititeerasopon 48'

== First to fourth place classification ==
=== Semi finals ===
8 September 2007
16:00

China	1 – 2	Japan
Chen Zhaoxia 20'		Komori 22'; Tsukui 24'

Umpires:
Corrine Cornelius
(South Africa)
Lim Mi-sook (Korea)

8 September 2007
18:30

South Korea	5 – 2	India
Kim Da-rae 22', 59'; Kim Jong-eun 25'; Cheon Seul-ki 46'; Seo Hye-jin 52'		Kharab 49', 63'

Umpires:
Lisa Roach (Australia)
Lin Miao (China)

=== Third and fourth place ===
9 September 2007
16:30

China	4 – 2	India
Song Qingling; Ma Yibo 22', 42'; Li Hongxia 27'		Bala; J. Kaur 69'

=== Final ===
9 September 2007
19:00

Japan	1 – 1 (AET) (7 – 6 PSO)	South Korea
Miura 26'		Kim Jong-eun 42'

2007 Women's Hockey Asia Cup winners

Japan
First title

== Final standings ==
1. Japan
2. South Korea
3. China
4. India
5. Malaysia
6. Thailand
7. Chinese Taipei
8. Hong Kong
9. Singapore
