= Kaori Chiba =

Japanese field hockey player

Personal information
- Born: January 29, 1981 (age 45) Minami-Alps, Yamanashi

Sport
- Sport: Field hockey
Medal record
Women's field hockey
Representing Japan
Asian Games
Silver medal – second place	2006 Doha	Team
Bronze medal – third place	2002 Busan	Team
Bronze medal – third place	2010 Guangzhou	Team
Asian Champions Trophy
Silver medal – second place	2010 Busan
Bronze medal – third place	2011 Ordos

Kaori Chiba-Fujio (Japanese: 千葉 香織; born January 29, 1981, in Minami-Alps, Yamanashi) is a field hockey player from Japan. She has represented her native country at three Summer Olympics (2004, 2008 and 2012).

Chiba was the top scorer at the 2006 Women's Hockey World Cup Qualifier in Rome, Italy, alongside Tomomi Komori (Japan), Rhona Simpson (Scotland) and Maryna Vynohradova (Ukraine), each scoring six goals.
