= Dinesh Nayak =

Indian field hockey player

Medal record

Representing India

Men's Field hockey

Asian Games
Silver medal – second place	2002 Busan	Team

Asia Cup
Gold medal – first place	2003 Kuala Lumpur	Team
Bronze medal – third place	1999 Kuala Lumpur	Team

V. R. Dinesh Nayak (born 17 May 1972 in Ernakulam, Kerala) is a field hockey defender from India, who made his international debut for the Men's National Team in 1993 during the test series against Kenya. Nicknamed Kaka, Nayak represented his native country at the 2000 Summer Olympics in Sydney, Australia, where India finished in seventh place.

Dinesh Nayak had his school education at Sree Rama Varma High School at Ernakulam, Kerala and went to complete his pre-degree at Maharajas College, Ernakulam taking science group. He joined the same college for a mathematics degree course but soon left to join Sports Authority of India (SAI). This is where his talent was discovered by future Indian hockey coaches, viz., Rapheal, Bhaskaran, Carvalho, Cedric etc. From 1993 to 2004 he used to be a constant fixture in the Indian National team either in junior or senior level.

Dinesh Nayak at present is associated with Indian Bank as an Assistant General Manager and is based at Mumbi. He is playing for bank team and support the development of new talent for the bank. He is married and have one son and a daughter.
