= Benjamin Hector =

South African cricketer (born 1979)

Benjamin Hector (born 5 August 1979 in Durban) is a former South African first-class cricketer for the Cape Cobras. Making his debut in 2001–02 for Free State, Hector was a right-handed batsman with a highest score of 200 not out. Both his father and uncle played first-class cricket in South Africa. His sister is field hockey player Kate Woods.
