= Field hockey at the 2002 Asian Games =

Field Hockey tournament in Busan, South Korea

- Venue: Gangseo Hockey Stadium
- Dates: 30 September 2002 – 12 October 2002
- Competitors: 190 from 8 nations

Medalists
gold medal	South Korea (men); China (women)
silver medal	India (men); South Korea (women)
bronze medal	Malaysia (men); Japan (women)

The field hockey events at the 2002 Asian Games were held in Busan, South Korea between 30 September and 12 October 2002. The competition took place at Gangseo Hockey Stadium.

== Medalists ==
Event	Gold	Silver	Bronze
Men	South Korea; Kang Keon-wook; Shin Seok-kyo; Jeon Jong-ha; Kim Yong-bae; Ji Seung-hwan; Hwang Jong-hyun; Kim Jung-chul; Lim Jong-chun; Kim Kyung-seok; Kim Yoon; Yeo Woon-kon; Kang Seong-jung; Song Seung-tae; Kim Chul; Seo Jong-ho; Lee Nam-yong	India; Devesh Chauhan; Bharat Chettri; Dilip Tirkey; Jugraj Singh; Kamalpreet Singh; Dinesh Nayak; Viren Rasquinha; Vikram Pillay; Ignace Tirkey; Bimal Lakra; Dhanraj Pillay; Deepak Thakur; Prabhjot Singh; Daljit Singh Dhillon; Gagan Ajit Singh; Tejbir Singh	Malaysia; Chairil Anwar Abdul Aziz; Shaiful Azli; Chua Boon Huat; Roslan Jamaluddin; Keevan Raj Kali; Gobinathan Krishnamurthy; Rodzhanizam Mat Radzi; Megat Azrafiq Termizi; Azlan Misron; Mohd Madzli Ikmar; Redzuan Ponirin; Mohd Amin Rahim; Norazlan Rahim; Mohd Fairuz Ramli; Kuhan Shanmuganathan; Kumar Subramaniam
Women	China; Nie Yali; Long Fengyu; Chen Zhaoxia; Ma Yibo; Cheng Hui; Huang Junxia; Fu Baorong; Li Shuang; Tang Chunling; Zhou Wanfeng; Zhang Haiying; Hou Xiaolan; Chen Qiuqi; Wang Jiuyan; Zhang Shuang; Li Aili	South Korea; Park Yong-sook; Kim Yoon-mi; Lee Jin-hee; Yoo Hee-joo; Lee Seon-ok; Ki Sook-hyun; Kim Eun-jin; Lee Mi-seong; Oh Ko-woon; Kim Seong-eun; Kim Jin-kyoung; Cho Jin-ju; Lee Eun-young; Lim Ju-young; Park Jeong-sook; Kang Na-young	Japan; Rie Terazono; Keiko Miura; Akemi Kato; Yukari Yamamoto; Sachimi Iwao; Chie Kimura; Yuka Ogura; Sakae Morimoto; Kaori Chiba; Naoko Saito; Toshie Tsukui; Nami Miyazaki; Hiromi Hashimoto; Akiko Kitada; Erika Esaki; Mayumi Ono

== Medal table ==
Rank	Nation	Gold	Silver	Bronze	Total
1	South Korea	1	1	0	2
2	China	1	0	0	1
3	India	0	1	0	1
4	Japan	0	0	1	1
4	Malaysia	0	0	1	1
Totals (5 entries)		2	2	2	6

== Draw ==
The teams were distributed based on their final ranking at the 1998 Asian Games using the serpentine system for their distribution. The women were played in round robin format, five teams registered but Uzbekistan withdrew.

Group A

- India (1)
- Japan (4)
- Malaysia (5)
- Bangladesh (9)

Group B

- South Korea (2)
- Pakistan (3)
- China (6)
- Hong Kong (8)

== Final standing ==
=== Men ===
Rank	Team	Pld	W	D	L
1st place, gold medalist(s)	South Korea	5	4	1	0
2nd place, silver medalist(s)	India	5	3	1	1
3rd place, bronze medalist(s)	Malaysia	5	2	1	2
4	Pakistan	5	3	1	1
5	China	5	3	0	2
6	Japan	5	2	0	3
7	Bangladesh	5	1	0	4
8	Hong Kong	5	0	0	5

=== Women ===
Rank	Team	Pld	W	D	L
1st place, gold medalist(s)	China	4	3	0	1
2nd place, silver medalist(s)	South Korea	4	2	0	2
3rd place, bronze medalist(s)	Japan	4	3	0	1
4	India	4	0	0	4
