= Duncan Woods =

South African water polo player

Personal information
- Nationality: South Africa
- Born: 4 March 1978 (age 48)
- Height: 1.83 m (6 ft 0 in)

Sport
- Sport: Water polo
- Handedness: right
- Position: centre back
National team
- Years: Team
- ?-?: South Africa

Duncan Woods (born 4 March 1978) is a South African male water polo player. He was a member of the South Africa men's national water polo team, playing as a centre back. He was a part of the team at the World Championships, most recently at the 2007 and 2009 World Aquatics Championships.

He is married to field hockey player Kate Woods.
