= Franco Nicola =

Argentine field hockey player (born 1966)

Franco Nicola (born 14 June 1966) is an Argentine former field hockey player who competed in the 1988 Summer Olympics.
