= Tomomi Komori =

Japanese field hockey player

Personal information
- Born: February 18, 1983 (age 43)
Medal record
Women's field hockey
Representing Japan
Asian Games
Silver medal – second place	2006 Doha	Team
Asia Cup
Gold medal – first place	2007 Hong Kong
Silver medal – second place	2004 New Delhi

Tomomi Komori (小森 皆実; born February 18, 1983 in Nikkō, Tochigi) is a female field hockey player from Japan. She twice represented her native country at the Summer Olympics (2004 and 2008). During the 2004 summer Olympics, the Japan women's field hockey team finished in 8th place, and in the 2008 Summer Olympics in 10th place.

Komori became top scorer at the 2006 Women's Hockey World Cup Qualifier in Rome, Italy, alongside Kaori Chiba (Japan), Rhona Simpson (Scotland) and Maryna Vynohradova (Ukraine), scoring six goals.
