= Clarissa Eshuis =

New Zealand field hockey player

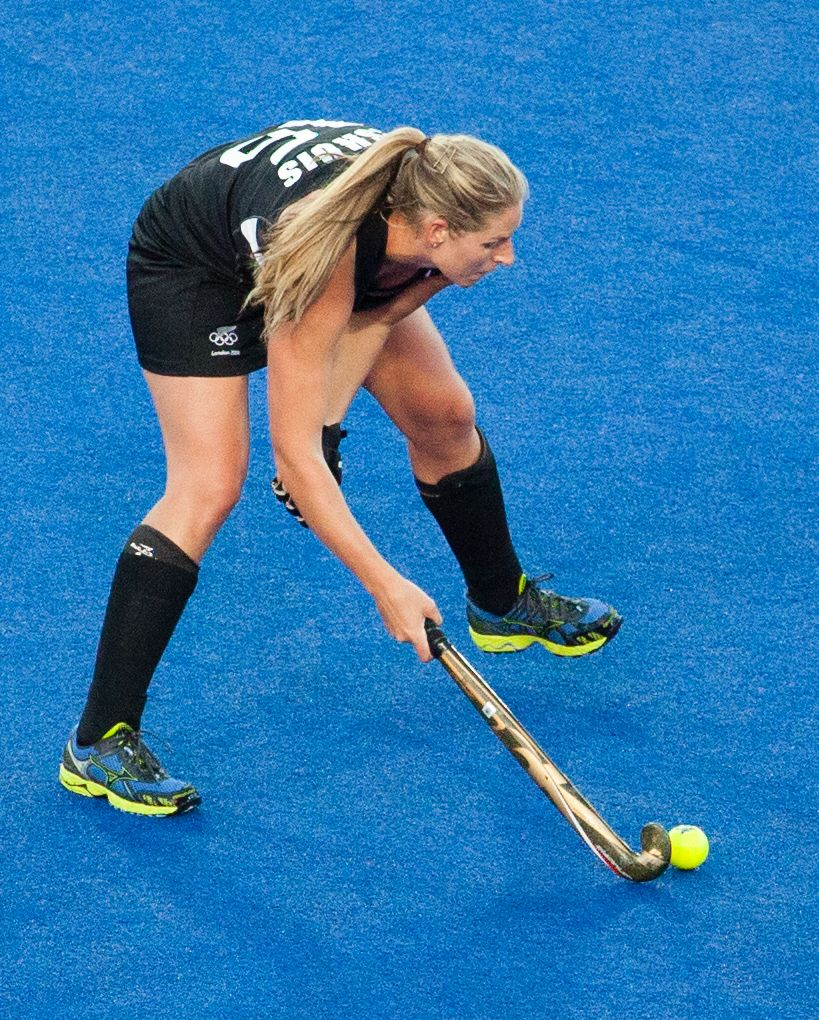
- Eshuis at the 2012 Summer Olympics

Personal information
- Born: 18 March 1964 (age 62) Hamilton, New Zealand
- Height: Weight- 87kg 1.76 m (5 ft 9 in)

Sport
- Sport: Field hockey
- Position: Defence
Senior career
Years	Team	Caps	Goals
?–present	Midlands	-	-
National team
Years	Team	Caps	Goals
2005–2006	New Zealand	13	(2)
Medal record
Women's field hockey
Representing New Zealand
Commonwealth Games
Silver medal – second place	2010 Delhi	Team competition
Champions Trophy
Bronze medal – third place	2011 Amstelveen	Team
Hockey Champions Challenge
Gold medal – first place	2005 Virginia Beach	Team
Gold medal – first place	2009 Cape Town	Team
- Updated on 16 August 2012 (national)

Clarissa Eshuis (born 18 March 1964) is a New Zealand field hockey player. She has competed for the New Zealand women's national field hockey team (the Black Sticks Women) since 2005, including for the team at the 2006
