= Carmel Bakurski =

Australian field hockey player

Personal information
- Born: Carmel Souter; 7 September 1976 (age 49) Murray Bridge, South Australia
Medal record
Women's Field Hockey
Representing Australia
Commonwealth Games
Bronze medal – third place	2002 Manchester	Team competition
Champions Trophy
Bronze medal – third place	2001 Amstelveen	Team competition
Gold medal – first place	2003 Sydney	Team competition

Carmel Bakurski (née Souter; born 7 September 1976 in Murray Bridge, South Australia) is a retired female field hockey defender from Australia. She made her debut for the Australia women's national field hockey team during the 1998 season (Argentina Tour) following the 1997 Junior World Cup (silver medal).

Nicknamed Carma she was a member of the Hockeyroos at the 2002 Commonwealth Games in Manchester where the team ended up in third place in the overall-rankings, and the 2004 Summer Olympics in Athens.

== Hockey ==
=== State Hockey ===
Carmel played for the SA Suns in the Australian Hockey League.

=== International Hockey ===
Carmel played international games for the Hockeyroos, including Champions Trophy, Commonwealth Games, Olympic Games and World Cup.

Her tournaments include:

- 2001 Women's Hockey Champions Trophy (Amstelveen) – 3rd BRONZE
- 2002 Women's Hockey Champions Trophy (Macau) – 4th
- 2002 Commonwealth Games (Manchester) – 1st GOLD
- 2002 Women's Hockey World Cup (Perth) – 4th
- 2003 Women's Hockey Champions Trophy (Sydney) – 1st GOLD
- 2004 Summer Olympics (Athens) – 5th
