= Toshie Tsukui =

Japanese field hockey player

Medal record

Women's field hockey

Representing Japan

Asian Games
Silver medal – second place	2006 Doha	Team
Bronze medal – third place	2002 Busan	Team

Asia Cup
Gold medal – first place	2007 Hong Kong	

Asian Champions Trophy
Bronze medal – third place	2011 Ordos	

Toshie Tsukui (born 30 July 1975) is a Japanese former field hockey player who competed in the 2008 Summer Olympics. She was part of the Japanese team that won the 2007 Asia Cup.
