= Chen Qunqing =

Chinese field hockey player

Personal information
- Born: March 22, 1983 (age 43) Chenghai, Shantou, Guangdong
Medal record
Women's field hockey
Representing China
Champions Trophy
Silver medal – second place	2003 Sydney	Team competition

Chen Qunqing (simplified Chinese: 陈群青; traditional Chinese: 陳群青; pinyin: Chén Qúnqīng; Jyutping: Chan4 Kwan4 Cheng1; born March 22, 1983, in Chenghai, Shantou, Guangdong) is a female Chinese field hockey player who competed at the 2004 Summer Olympics in Athens, Greece. She finished fourth with the Chinese team in the women's competition, and played all six matches.
