= 2004 Women's Hockey Asia Cup =

International field hockey tournament

Tournament details
- Host country: India
- City: New Delhi
- Dates: 1–8 February
- Teams: 8 (from 1 confederation)
- Venue: Dhyan Chand National Stadium

Final positions
- Champions: India (1st title)
- Runner-up: Japan
- Third place: China

Tournament statistics
- Matches played: 18
- Goals scored: 134 (7.44 per match)

The 2004 Women's Hockey Asia Cup was the fifth edition of the Women's Hockey Asia Cup. It was held from 1 to 8 February 2004 at the Dhyan Chand National Stadium in New Delhi, India. The winner qualified for the 2006 World Cup.

India won the tournament for the first time by defeating Japan 1–0 in the final.

== Teams ==
- China
- India
- Japan
- Kazakhstan
- Malaysia
- Singapore
- South Korea
- Sri Lanka

== Officials ==
The following umpires were appointed by the International Hockey Federation to officiate the tournament:

- Khabaria Chandrakant (SGP)
- Corinne Cornelius (RSA)
- Ivonne Darling (SRI)
- Alison Hill (ENG)
- Emi Furuta (JPN)
- Nor Piza Hassan (MAS)
- Kang Hyung-Young (KOR)
- Happy Maan (IND)
- Radhasukumaran (IND)
- Mónica Rivera (ESP)

== Results ==
All times are local (UTC+5:30)

=== Preliminary round ===
==== Pool A ====
Pos	Team	Pld	W	D	L	GF	GA	GD	Pts	Qualification
1	India (H)	3	2	1	0	13	3	+10	7	Advanced to Semi-finals
2	China	3	2	1	0	12	3	+9	7	Advanced to Semi-finals
3	Malaysia	3	1	0	2	5	11	−6	3	
4	Kazakhstan	3	0	0	3	1	14	−13	0	

Source: Reddif
Rules for classification: 1) points; 2) goal difference; 3) goals scored; 4) head-to-head result.
(H) Hosts

1 February 2004
13:00

China	4–1	Kazakhstan
Ren 6'; Li A. 35', 48'; Gao 59'	Report	Imangaliyeva 8'

Umpires:
Kang Hyung-Young (KOR)
Corinne Cornelius (RSA)

1 February 2004
15:00

India	4–2	Malaysia
Mamta 5'; Jasjeet 17'; Suman 51'; Saba 57'	Report	Nurul 28'; Afnida 37'

Umpires:
Emi Furuta (JPN)
Khabaria Chandrakant (SGP)

2 February 2004
13:00

Malaysia	2–0	Kazakhstan
Nadia 29'; Nurul 51'	Report

Umpires:
Khabaria Chandrakant (SGP)
Ivonne Darling (SRI)

2 February 2004
15:00

China	1–1	India
Ma Y. 33'	Report	Jyoti 68'

Umpires:
Mónica Rivera (ESP)
Kang Hyung-Young (KOR)

4 February 2004
10:30

Malaysia	1–7	China
Nurul 40'	Report	Chen Qi. 5', 47'; Li A. 48'; Gao 49'; Huang 51'; Ma Y. 63', 66'

Umpires:
Ivonne Darling (SRI)
Mónica Rivera (ESP)

4 February 2004
11:00

India	8–0	Kazakhstan
Surinder 1', 3'; Suraj 28'; Sanggai 36', 60'; Kerketta 50', 51'; Saba 56'	Report

Umpires:
Alison Hill (ENG)
Emi Furuta (JPN)

==== Pool B ====
Pos	Team	Pld	W	D	L	GF	GA	GD	Pts	Qualification
1	Japan	3	3	0	0	40	3	+37	9	Advanced to Semi-finals
2	South Korea	3	2	0	1	27	5	+22	6	Advanced to Semi-finals
3	Singapore	3	1	0	2	2	24	−22	3	
4	Sri Lanka	3	0	0	3	0	37	−37	0	

Source: Reddif
Rules for classification: 1) points; 2) goal difference; 3) goals scored; 4) head-to-head result.

1 February 2004
10:30

Japan	15–0	Singapore
	Report

Umpires:
Nor Piza Hassan (MAS)
Alison Hill (ENG)

1 February 2004
11:00

South Korea	15–0	Sri Lanka
Kim E. 3'; Kim J. 6', 33', 35', 37'; Nam 14', 39', 46'; Oh 25', 30', 32', 51'; Im 27'; Jeong 41'; Han 61'	Report

Umpires:
Mónica Rivera (ESP)
Radhasukumaran (IND)

2 February 2004
10:30

Japan	21–0	Sri Lanka
Nakagawa 2'; Iwao 12', 14', 17', 19', 31', 33'; Kimura 21', 51'; Komazawa 24', 35', 49'; Komori 27', 37', 40', 64'; Morimoto 35', 62'; Miura 45', 53'; Kitada 58'	Report

Umpires:
Alison Hill (ENG)
Happy Maan (IND)

2 February 2004
11:00

Singapore	1–9	South Korea
Qi 30'	Report	Kim J. 2', 6', 7'; Choi 4'; Nam 11', 19', 62'; Kang N. 16'; Oh 43'

Umpires:
Corinne Cornelius (RSA)
Nor Piza Hassan (MAS)

4 February 2004
13:00

Singapore	1–0	Sri Lanka
Chen H. 24'	Report

Umpires:
Happy Maan (IND)
Radhasukumaran (IND)

4 February 2004
15:00

South Korea	3–4	Japan
Han 50'; Oh 66'; Nam 70'	Report	Komori 5'; Iwao 17'; Morimoto 19'; Saito 25'

Umpires:
Corinne Cornelius (RSA)
Nor Piza Hassan (MAS)

=== Classification round ===
==== Fifth to eighth place classification ====
Crossover
6 February
Malaysia	4
Sri Lanka	0
6 February
Singapore	0
Kazakhstan	4

Fifth place
7 February
Malaysia	1 (0)
Kazakhstan (pen.)	1 (2)
Seventh place
7 February
Sri Lanka	2
Singapore	3

===== Crossover =====
6 February 2004
11:00

Malaysia	4–0	Sri Lanka

Umpires:
Khabaria Chandrakant (SGP)
Emi Furuta (JPN)

6 February 2004
13:30

Singapore	0–4	Kazakhstan

Umpires:
Radhasukumaran (IND)
Kang Hyung-Young (KOR)

===== Seventh and eighth place =====
7 February 2004
13:00

Sri Lanka	2–3	Singapore

Umpires:
Kang Hyung-Young (KOR)
Happy Maan (IND)

===== Fifth and sixth place =====
7 February 2004
14:30

Malaysia	1–1	Kazakhstan
Saliza 17'	Report	Baissarind 65'
Penalties
	0–2

Umpires:
Emi Furuta (JPN)
Ivonne Darling (SRI)

=== First to fourth place classification ===
Semi-finals
6 February
India	5
South Korea	0
6 February
Japan	6
China	2

Final
8 February
India	1
Japan	0
Third place
8 February
South Korea	0 (0)
China (p.s.o.)	0 (3)

==== Semi-finals ====
8 February 2004
11:30

India	5–0	South Korea
Sanggai 15', 39'; Jasjeet 47'; Suman 56', 64'	Report

Umpires:
Mónica Rivera (ESP)
Alison Hill (ENG)

8 February 2004
15:00

Japan	6–2	China
Miura 4'; Komazawa 17'; Morimoto 49', 51'; Komori 55'; Saito 63'	Report	Ma Y. 42', 52'

Umpires:
Corinne Cornelius (RSA)
Happy Maan (IND)

==== Third place game ====
8 February 2004
11:00

South Korea	0–0	China
Penalties
Kang N. (penalty shoot-out missed); Seo (penalty shoot-out missed); Gim (penalty shoot-out missed)	0–3	(penalty shoot-out scored) Ma Y. (penalty shoot-out scored) Mai; (penalty shoot-out scored) Chen Q.

Umpires:
Nor Piza Hassan (MAS)
Alison Hill (ENG)

==== Final ====
8 February 2004
13:30

India	1–0	Japan
Jasjeet 64'	Report

Umpires:
Corinne Cornelius (RSA)
Mónica Rivera (ESP)

== Final standings ==
Rank	Team
1st place, gold medalist(s)	India
2nd place, silver medalist(s)	Japan
3rd place, bronze medalist(s)	China
4	South Korea
5	Kazakhstan
6	Malaysia
7	Singapore
8	Sri Lanka

Team qualified for the 2006 World Cup

== See also ==
- 2003 Men's Hockey Asia Cup
