= Chie Kimura =

Japanese field hockey player

Medal record

Women's field hockey

Representing Japan

Asian Games
Silver medal – second place	2006 Doha	Team
Bronze medal – third place	2002 Busan	Team

Asia Cup
Gold medal – first place	2007 Hong Kong	
Silver medal – second place	2004 New Delhi	

Chie Kimura (木村 千恵, Kimura Chie; born 8 April 1980) is a Japanese field hockey player who has competed in the women's field hockey event in the 2004 and 2008 Summer Olympics.
