= Julieta Franco =

Argentine field hockey player

Personal information
- Born: April 2, 1977 (age 49) Ayacucho, Buenos Aires, Argentina
- Height: 1.60 m (5 ft 3 in)

Sport
- Sport: Field hockey
- Position: Midfielder
- Club: Real Club de Polo de Barcelona
Senior career
Years	Team	Caps	Goals
–	Mar del Plata Club	-	-
2007-Present	Real Club de Polo de Barcelona	-	-
National team
Years	Team	Caps	Goals
2009	Italy		-
2012	Argentina		-
- Updated on October 23, 2012

Julieta Franco is an Argentine field hockey player. In February 2012 she was called to be part of the Argentina women's national field hockey team for her first time to train for the 2012 Summer Olympics, and later was chosen as an alternate player (P accreditation). The Argentine team went on to win the silver medal.
