= Qiu Yingling =

Chinese field hockey player

Personal information
- Born: July 8, 1980 (age 45)
Medal record
Women's field hockey
Representing China
Champions Trophy
Silver medal – second place	2003 Sydney	Team competition

Qiu Yingling (Chinese: 邱英玲; pinyin: Qiū Yīnglíng; Cantonese Yale: Yau1 Ying1 Ling4; born July 8, 1980, in Yangchun, Yangjiang, Guangdong) is a female Chinese field hockey player who competed at the 2004 Summer Olympics.

She finished fourth with the Chinese team in the women's competition. She played three matches.
