= Catriona Forrest =

Scottish field hockey player

Catriona Forrest (born 27 February 1984, in Glasgow) is a female field hockey defender from Scotland. She plays club hockey for Glasgow Western Ladies, and made her debut for the Women's National Team in 2005. Her older brother James represented Scotland at cricket up to U19 level. She is a physiotherapist for the British National Health Service.

== See also ==
- Catriona
