= Chloe Rogers =

English field hockey player

Personal information
- Born: 30 March 1985 (age 41) Harlow, Essex, England
- Height: 1.61 m (5 ft 3 1/2 in)

Sport
- Sport: Field hockey
- Position: Midfield /Forward
Senior career
Years	Team	Caps	Goals
2013–2014	Old Loughtonians	2	2
2008–2013	Leicester	-	6
2000–2008	Chelmsford	-	28
National team
Years	Team	Caps	Goals
2007–2012	Great Britain	63	(5)
2003–2011	England	99	(11)
2009–2010	England Indoor	6	(11)
Medal record
Representing Great Britain
Olympic Games
Bronze medal – third place	2012 London	Team
Visa International Invitational Hockey Tournament
Gold medal – first place	2012 London	Team
Champions Trophy
Silver medal – second place	2012 Rosario	Team
Setanta Sports Trophy
Gold medal – first place	2008 Dublin	Team
Representing England
World Hockey Cup
Bronze medal – third place	2010 Rosario	Team
European Championship
Bronze medal – third place	2007 Manchester	Team
Bronze medal – third place	2009 Amsterdam	Team
Bronze medal – third place	2011 Gladbach	Team
Commonwealth Games
Bronze medal – third place	2006 Melbourne	Team
Bronze medal – third place	2010 Delhi	Team
Champions Trophy
Bronze medal – third place	2010 Nottingham	Team
Champions Challenge
Bronze medal – third place	2007 Baku	Team
NZ National Hockey League
Silver medal – second place	2009 Midlands	Team
- Updated on 13 August 2012

Chloe Rogers at Chelmer Park in 2009

Chloe Naomi Rogers (born 30 March 1985 in Harlow, Essex) is an English field hockey player midfield and forward and London 2012 Olympic bronze medal-winner. She made her senior international debut for the England women's national field hockey team in November 2003 versus Japan at Chelmer Park, Chelmsford, Essex. She holds a World Cup bronze, a Champions Trophy silver and bronze along with two Commonwealth Games bronze medals as well as European Championship bronzes. She is also one of the leading indoor hockey players in the UK.

== Hockey ==
Chloe Rogers first started playing hockey in 1994 at Dunmow Hockey Club (now known as Phoenix Hockey Club) when the Dunmow Minis were first formed. She went on to play for other clubs in Essex including Dunmow HC, Braintree HC and Bishop's Stortford HC before spending 8 seasons with Chelmsford Hockey Club.

She was the England women's team's top goal scorer at the 2006 World Cup in Madrid, Spain, helping the team to finish seventh, and other international honours include a KT Cup gold medal and a Setanta Sports Trophy gold medal.

2006 also marked the first Commonwealth Games bronze medal win at the 2006 Melbourne Commonwealth Games in Australia.

Chloe scored the opening goal in Chelmsford's 2–1 win over Canterbury in the final of the English indoor hockey championships in 2006. Chelmsford went to Hamburg, Germany in February 2007, to take part in the women's Eurohockey Indoor Club Champions Cup. They finished sixth overall in the competition, with Chloe scoring at least once in every Chelmsford match.

At Chelmsford she won a European outdoor silver medal and a European indoor bronze medal and, under Karen Brown's coaching, the side came runners-up in the Premier League.

England women's national field hockey team qualified for the Beijing Olympics at the Eurohockey Nations Championship staged at Belle Vue, in Manchester, during August 2007. Chloe was a part of the team that came 3rd and won a bronze medal, during the bronze medal match with Spain she received her 50th international cap for England.

Chloe has the nickname in the Chelmsford team of "Ginger", after the dancer, Ginger Rogers.

During the Summer of 2009 Chloe played in the Champions Trophy in Sydney, and won bronze in Amsterdam at the Eurohockey Nations Championship 2009 with England.

In September 2008 she moved to Leicester Hockey Club, and in September 2009 she spent a month playing for Bayleys Midlands as their visiting international in New Zealand's National Hockey League, and won a silver medal with Bayleys Midlands.

During December 2009, Chloe gained her first cap for the England Indoor Hockey Team, scoring the third goal of a 3–1 victory against Scotland at the National Indoor Arena in Birmingham. She was also vice-captain of the team.

Chloe is a part of Team Essex, run by Essex County Council, she helps to promote sport and well being in Essex through coaching sessions at local schools and by talking about her hockey playing.

Essex County Council are running a programme linking the Team Essex Ambassador athletes with local artists. A multimedia piece of art was created by Colchester artist, Tim Skinner, using recordings he made of Chloe hitting a hockey ball.

Colchester-based artist Jacqueline Davies created 'It's My Bag' in 2012, using items from Chloe's life and playing career to produce a hockey stick bag. The artwork has been displayed at Saffron Walden museum and can currently be seen in the entrance hall to the Braintree Leisure Centre as of 2015.

In 2012, Leicester beat Reading to secure the Premier League title with Chloe sinking two penalty shuttles after the match went to a sudden death shootout.

Chloe joined Old Loughtonians in Essex for the start of the 2013/14 hockey season, after playing for Leicester Ladies since 2008.

Chloe writes a blog for the Team Essex project.

== Beijing Olympics 2008 ==
Great Britain finished 6th in the hockey tournament at the Beijing Olympics.

The result secured England's place in the Champions Trophy hockey for 2009 (in Sydney, Australia), and 2010 (in Nottingham, United Kingdom).

At the 2009 Tournament, Chloe played with the number 12 shirt and was yellow carded and sent to the sin bin during a pool game against Japan. GB eventually won the match 2–1.

== Champions Trophy, World Cup and Commonwealth Games 2010 ==
Chloe was a part of the team that came third in the Champions Trophy staged in Nottingham, the best ever performance of an England women's hockey team in this annual competition. Along with this came first ever women's hockey bronze medal for an England side at the World Cup in Rosario and another Commonwealth Games bronze in Delhi.

== London Olympics 2012 ==
The squad selection for the Great Britain women's hockey team was announced on Friday, 18 May 2012. Chloe was included and is set to take part in her second Olympic Games.

Chloe was part of the Olympic bronze medal-winning GB team at the London Olympic Games during August 2012.

== Champions Trophy 2012 ==
The Great Britain team made the final of this elite competition and secured a silver medal, losing 1–0 to Argentina.

Chloe was presented with a silver plate to mark her 50th Great Britain cap before the match started

== Golf ==
Chloe has played golf from a young age and at the start of July 2007 won the BUSA Women's Individual Strokeplay Championship. As a result of this, she led the BUSA Women's England team to victory in the Home Golf Internationals at the start of September.

This is in addition to her 2004 title of Essex Ladies Champion. In 2000, she was one of the youngest ever finalists in the Daily Telegraph Junior Golf Championship.

== Awards ==
Chloe was the Essex Chronicle Sports Personality of the Year 2009 and was presented with the award at the County Ground in Chelmsford by Essex and former Zimbabwean cricketer, Grant Flower. The award was voted for by readers of the Essex Chronicle and Brentwood Gazette. And she achieved this award again during 2012.

She has held the Marjorie Pollard Salver, presented by the Hockey Writers' Club of Great Britain in July 2008 during the Setanta Sports Trophy in Dublin.
