= Marina di Giacomo =

Argentine field hockey player

Medal record

Representing Argentina

Women's Field hockey

Olympic Games
Bronze medal – third place	2004 Athens	Team

Marina di Giacomo (born 9 January 1976) is an Argentine field hockey player. She was born in Godoy Cruz, Mendoza. She won a bronze medal at the 2004 Summer Olympics in Athens.
