= Li Shuang (field hockey) =

Chinese field hockey player

Personal information
- Born: July 14, 1978 (age 47) Siping, Jilin
Medal record
Women's field hockey
Representing China
Olympic Games
Silver medal – second place	2008 Beijing	Team
Asian Games
Gold medal – first place	2002 Busan	Team
Gold medal – first place	2006 Doha	Team
Gold medal – first place	2010 Guangzhou	Team
Bronze medal – third place	1998 Bangkok	Team
Asia Cup
Gold medal – first place	2009 Bangkok
Champions Trophy
Silver medal – second place	2003 Sydney

Li Shuang (Chinese: 李爽; pinyin: Lǐ Shuǎng; born July 14, 1978, in Siping, Jilin) is a female Chinese field hockey player who competed at the 2004 Summer Olympics.

She finished fourth with the Chinese team in the women's competition. She played all six matches.
