= Holly Cram =

Scottish field hockey player

Holly Cram (born 30 April 1984) is a Scottish field hockey forward. She won 140 caps playing for the Women's National Team.

Cram was born in Glasgow and went to school at Glasgow Academy. She studied at the University of Edinburgh, graduating with an honours degree in literature. She then completed a Postgraduate Diploma in Physical Education at the University of Strathclyde.

She reached the 100 cap mark by August 2011. She played club hockey for Glasgow Western.

Cram is a Game On Scotland ambassador for Glasgow 2014.

She works as a hockey coach at Dollar Academy in Clackmannanshire.
