= Kathleen Taylor (field hockey) =

South African field hockey player

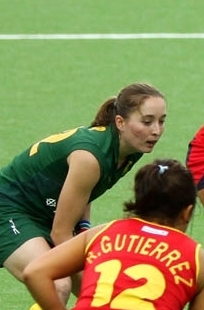
- 2010 Women's Hockey World Cup

Personal information
- Born: Kathleen Francis Taylor; 9 November 1984 (age 41) Oxford, England
- Height: 163 cm (5 ft 4 in)
- Weight: 56 kg (123 lb)

Sport
- Sport: Field hockey
National team
Years	Team	Caps	Goals
2005	South Africa U21	8	(0)
2006–2014	South Africa	231	(28)

Kathleen Taylor (born 9 November 1984) is a South African field hockey player who competed in the 2008 Summer Olympics.
