= Chen Qiuqi =

Chinese field hockey player

Personal information
- Born: July 4, 1980 (age 45) Mei County, Guangdong
Medal record
Women's field hockey
Representing China
Olympic Games
Silver medal – second place	2008 Beijing	Team
Asian Games
Gold medal – first place	2002 Busan	Team
Gold medal – first place	2006 Doha	Team
Asia Cup
Bronze medal – third place	2004 New Delhi
Bronze medal – third place	2007 Hong Kong
Champions Trophy
Silver medal – second place	2003 Sydney

Chen Qiuqi (simplified Chinese: 陈秋绮; traditional Chinese: 陳秋綺; pinyin: Chén Qiūqǐ; Jyutping: Chan^{4} Chau^{1}Yi^{2}; born July 4, 1980, in Mei County (now Meixian District), Guangdong) is a female Chinese field hockey player who competed at the 2004 Summer Olympics.

She finished fourth with the Chinese team in the women's competition. She played all six matches and scored one goal.
