= Zhou Wanfeng =

Chinese field hockey player

Personal information
- Born: November 17, 1979 (age 46)
Medal record
Women's field hockey
Representing China
Olympic Games
Silver medal – second place	2008 Beijing	Team
Asian Games
Gold medal – first place	2002 Busan	Team
Gold medal – first place	2006 Doha	Team
Asia Cup
Bronze medal – third place	2007 Hong Kong
Champions Trophy
Silver medal – second place	2003 Sydney

Zhou Wanfeng (Chinese: 周婉峰; pinyin: Zhōu Wǎnfēng; Cantonese Yale: Jau1 Yun2 Fung1; born November 17, 1979, in Nanhai, Foshan, Guangdong) is a female Chinese field hockey player. She competed in the 2000 Summer Olympics and the 2004 Summer Olympics.

In 2000, she was part of the Chinese team which finished fifth in the women's competition. She played all seven matches.

Four years later, she finished fourth with the Chinese team in the women's competition. She again played all six matches, four in the preliminary round, followed by the semi-final and bronze-medal matches.
