= Tang Chunling =

Chinese field hockey player

Personal information
- Born: June 24, 1976 (age 50)
Medal record
Women's field hockey
Representing China
Olympic Games
Silver medal – second place	2008 Beijing	Team
Asian Games
Gold medal – first place	2002 Busan	Team
Gold medal – first place	2006 Doha	Team
Bronze medal – third place	1998 Bangkok	Team
Asia Cup
Bronze medal – third place	2007 Hong Kong
Champions Trophy
Silver medal – second place	2003 Sydney	Team

Tang Chunling (Chinese: 唐春玲; pinyin: Táng Chūnlíng, born June 24, 1976, in Yitong, Siping, Jilin) is a Chinese field hockey player who competed in the 2000, 2004 and 2012 Summer Olympics.

In 2000, she was part of the Chinese team which finished fifth in the women's competition. She played all seven matches and scored one goal.

Four years later Tang finished fourth with the Chinese team in the women's competition. She played all six matches and scored four goals.

At the 2008 Summer Olympics, she was part of the Chinese team that won the silver medal.

In 2012, Tang was one of the team reserves.
