= Chen Zhaoxia =

Chinese field hockey player (born 1975)

Personal information
- Born: April 25, 1975 (age 51) Guanghan, Deyang, Sichuan
Medal record
Women's field hockey
Representing China
Olympic Games
Silver medal – second place	2008 Beijing	Team
Asian Games
Gold medal – first place	2002 Busan	Team
Gold medal – first place	2006 Doha	Team
Bronze medal – third place	1998 Bangkok	Team
Asia Cup
Bronze medal – third place	2007 Hong Kong
Champions Trophy
Silver medal – second place	2003 Sydney

Chen Zhaoxia (simplified Chinese: 陈朝霞; traditional Chinese: 陳朝霞; pinyin: Chén Zhāoxiá; born April 25, 1975, in Guanghan, Deyang, Sichuan) is a female Chinese former field hockey player who competed in the 2000 Summer Olympics and the 2004 Summer Olympics.

In 2000, she was part of the Chinese team that finished fifth in the women's competition. She played all seven matches.

Four years later, she finished fourth with the Chinese team in the women's competition. She played all six matches.

In her senior outdoor career since 2013, she competed in 68 matches with 28 wins, 10 draws, and scored 6 goals.
