= Rika Komazawa =

Japanese field hockey player

Medal record

Women's field hockey

Representing Japan

Asian Games
Silver medal – second place	2006 Doha	Team
Bronze medal – third place	2010 Guangzhou	Team

Asia Cup
Gold medal – first place	2007 Hong Kong	
Silver medal – second place	2004 New Delhi	

Asian Champions Trophy
Silver medal – second place	2010 Busan	
Bronze medal – third place	2011 Ordos	

Rika Komazawa (駒沢 李佳, Komazawa Rika; born 7 June 1982 in Sennan, Osaka) is a Japanese field hockey player who competed in the field hockey tournaments at the 2004, 2008 and 2012 Summer Olympics.
