= Kate Woods (field hockey) =

South African field hockey player

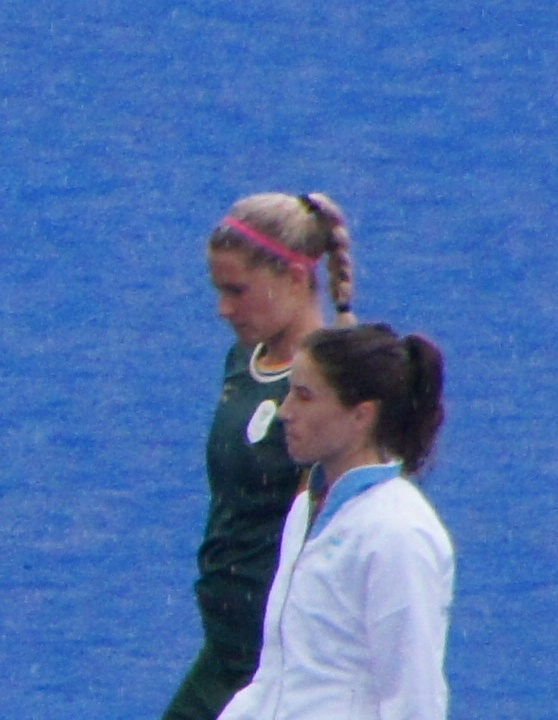
- Argentina v South Africa, 2012 Summer Olympics
- Born: Kate Hector; 11 October 1981 (age 44); Johannesburg, Gauteng, South Africa
- Spouse: Duncan Woods
- Relatives: Benjamin Hector (brother)
- Field hockey career
- Sport: Field hockey
- Position: midfielder
Medal record
Women's field hockey
Representing South Africa
All-Africa Games
Gold medal – first place	2003 Abuja	Team
Champions Challenge
Silver medal – second place	2005 Virginia Beach	Team
Africa Cup of Nations
Gold medal – first place	2005 Pretoria

Kate Woods (née Hector, born 11 October 1981) is a South African field hockey player.

Woods was born Kate Hector on 11 October 1981 in Johannesburg, Gauteng. She attended Durban Girls' College. She was a member of the national squad that finished 9th at the 2004 Summer Olympics in Athens. The midfielder's hometown is Cape Town, and she is nicknamed KT. She plays for a provincial team based in Western Province.

At the 2012 Summer Olympics she competed with the South Africa women's national field hockey team in the women's tournament.

She is married to water polo player Duncan Woods. Her brother is first-class cricketer Benjamin Hector.

== International senior tournaments ==
- 2003 – All Africa Games (Abuja, Nigeria)
- 2004 – Olympic Games (Athens, Greece)
- 2005 – Champions Challenge (Virginia Beach, United States)
- 2006 – Commonwealth Games (Melbourne, Australia)
- 2006 – World Cup (Madrid, Spain)
- 2008 – Olympic Games (Beijing, PR China)
- 2012 – Olympic Games (London, United Kingdom)
