= Rie Terazono =

Japanese field hockey player

Personal information
- Born: January 31, 1981 (age 45)
Medal record
Women's field hockey
Representing Japan
Asian Games
| Silver medal – second place | 2006 Doha | Team |
| Bronze medal – third place | 2002 Busan | Team |

Rie Terazono (Japanese: 寺園 理恵; born January 31, 1981) is a field hockey goalkeeper from Japan. She represented her country at the 2004 Summer Olympics in Athens, Greece.
