= Sachimi Iwao =

Japanese field hockey player

Personal information
- Born: February 20, 1976 (age 50)
Medal record
Women's field hockey
Representing Japan
Asian Games
Silver medal – second place	2006 Doha	Team
Bronze medal – third place	2002 Busan	Team
Asia Cup
Gold medal – first place	2007 Hong Kong	Team
Silver medal – second place	2004 New Delhi
Asian Champions Trophy
Bronze medal – third place	2011 Ordos

Sachimi Iwao (岩尾 幸美, Iwao Sachimi; born February 20, 1976, in Kokonoe, Oita) is a field hockey player from Japan. She has represented her native country at the Summer Olympics three times (2004, 2008 and 2012). She was named Best Player at the 2006 Women's Hockey World Cup Qualifier in Rome, Italy.
