= Kim Mi-seon =

South Korean hockey player

Mi-son
Personal information
- Full name: Kim Mi-seon
- Nationality: South Korean
- Born: 5 March 1983 (age 43)

Sport
- Sport: Field hockey
Medal record
Women's field hockey
Representing South Korea
Asia Cup
Silver medal – second place	2007 Hong Kong

Kim Mi-seon (born 5 March 1983) is a South Korean former field hockey player. She competed at the 2004 Summer Olympics and the 2008 Summer Olympics.
