= Maryna Vynohradova =

Ukrainian-Italian field hockey player

Personal information
- Born: 30 June 1983 (age 43)

Sport
- Sport: Field hockey
- Position: Midfielder
- Club: S.G. Amsicora Cagliari
National team
Years	Team	Caps	Goals
–	Ukraine	6	-
–	Italy	9	-

Maryna Vynohradova (born 30 June 1983) is a Ukrainian-Italian field hockey player for the Italian national team.

She participated at the 2018 Women's Hockey World Cup.
