= Ko Kwang-min (field hockey) =

South Korean hockey player

Personal information
- Nationality: South Korean
- Born: 20 February 1981 (age 45)

Sport
- Sport: Field hockey

Ko Kwang-min (born 20 February 1981) is a South Korean field hockey player. She competed in the women's tournament at the 2004 Summer Olympics.
