= 2002 Women's Hockey World Cup squads =

This article lists the confirmed squads for the 2002 Women's Hockey World Cup tournament held in Perth, Australia, between November 24 and December 8, 2002.

== Pool A ==
=== Argentina ===
Head Coach: Sergio Vigil

No.	Player	Pos.	Age
1.	Mariela Antoniska	GK
2.	Soledad García	FW
3.	Magdalena Aicega	DF
4.	María Paz Ferrari	MF
6.	Ayelén Stepnik	MF
8.	Luciana Aymar	MF
9.	Vanina Oneto	FW
11.	Karina Masotta (c)	FW
12.	Mariana González Oliva	MF

No.	Player	Pos.	Age
14.	Mercedes Margalot	DF
15.	María de la Paz Hernández	FW
16.	Cecilia Rognoni	DF
17.	María Inés Parodi	MF
18.	Paola Vukojicic	GK
19.	Mariné Russo	MF
21.	Inés Arrondo	FW
23.	Natali Doreski	FW
24.	Claudia Burkart	DF

=== China ===
Head Coach: Kim Chang-back

No.	Player	Pos.	Age
1.	Nie Yali	GK
2.	Long Fengu
3.	Chen Zhaoxia (c)
4.	Ma Yibo
5.	Cheng Hui
6.	Liu Yanli
7.	Huang Junxia
8.	Fu Baorong
9.	Li Shuang

No.	Player	Pos.	Age
11.	Tang Chunling
12.	Zhou Wanfeng
13.	Zhang Haiying
14.	Chen Xiolan
15.	Hou Xialoan
16.	Pan Fengzhen	GK
17.	Qiu Yingling
19.	Chen Qiuqi
22.	Li Aili

=== Germany ===
Head Coach: Peter Lemmen

No.	Player	Pos.	Age
1.	Birgit Beyer	GK
2.	Louise Walter
3.	Denise Klecker
4.	Tina Bachmann
5.	Nadine Ernsting-Krienke
6.	Julia Boie
7.	Natascha Keller
8.	Melanie Cremer
10.	Nina Kramer

No.	Player	Pos.	Age
13.	Marion Rodewald
14.	Anke Böhmert
15.	Heike Lätzsch
16.	Fanny Rinne
19.	Britta von Livonius
21.	Silke Müller
23.	Badri Latif
25.	Janina Totzke
32.	Franziska Gude (c)	DF

=== New Zealand ===
Head coach: Jan Borren

No.	Player	Pos.	Age
3.	Paula Enoka
4.	Sandy Bennett
5.	Rachel Sutherland
7.	Skippy Hamahona	DF	27
8.	Jaimee Provan
9.	Carol Ward
10.	Lizzy Igasan
11.	Michelle Turner
12.	Karen Mee

No.	Player	Pos.	Age
14.	Suzie Pearce
15.	Anne-Marie Irving	GK
16.	Helen Clarke (c)	GK
17.	Caryn Paewai
18.	Diana Weavers
20.	Amanda Christie
21.	Niniwa Roberts
23.	Tara Drysdale
25.	Lisa Bishop

=== Russia ===
Head Coach: Oleg Potapov

No.	Player	Pos.	Age
1.	Oxana Boyko
2.	Natalya Kravchenko
3.	Natalya Timonyna
4.	Natalya Verschynyna
5.	Irina Pyskunuvh
6.	Olga Velmatkyna
7.	Galina Timshyna
8.	Olga Nikolayeva
9.	Tatyana Vasyoukova

No.	Player	Pos.	Age
10.	Elena Polovkova
11.	Galina Basaychuk
12.	Ekaterina Rastorguyeva
13.	Nadezda Chegurdayeva
14.	Marina Chegurdayeva
15.	Tatyana Youdovskaya
16.	Tatyana Sosnyhyna
17.	Irina Sviridova
16.	Galina Terentyeva

=== Scotland ===
Head Coach: Mike Gilbert

No.	Player	Pos.	Age
1.	Tracey Robb
2.	Debbie McLeod
3.	Vikki Bunce
4.	Helen Walker
5.	Audrey Longmuir
6.	Claire Lampard
7.	Jane Burley
8.	Alisa Young
9.	Samantha Judge

No.	Player	Pos.	Age
10.	Rhona Simpson
11.	Alison Grant
12.	Linda Clement
13.	Cheryl Valentine
14.	Emma Rochlin
15.	Alison Rowatt
16.	Susan Gilmour
17.	Louise Gordon
18.	Louise Carroll

=== Korea ===
Head Coach: Lim Heung-Sin

No.	Player	Pos.	Age
1.	Park Yong-Sook	GK
2.	Kim Jin-Hee
3.	Lee Jin-Hee
4.	Yoo Hee-Joo
5.	Lee Seon-Ok
6.	Ki Sook-Hyun
7.	Kim Eun-Jin
8.	Lee Mi-Seong
10.	Oh Ko-Woon

No.	Player	Pos.	Age
11.	Kim Seong-Eun
12.	Kim Jin-Kyoung
13.	Jo Jin-Ju
14.	Choi Su-Yun
15.	Lee Eun-Young (c)
16.	Lim Ju-Young	GK
17.	Kim Jung-Hee
18.	Park Jeong-Sook

=== Ukraine ===
Head Coach: Tetyana Zhuk

No.	Player	Pos.	Age
1.	Viktoriya Kotlyarenko
2.	Fyeridye Bilyalova
3.	Ayshe Ramazanova
4.	Olena Fritche
5.	Maryna Pyrohova
6.	Maryna Vynohradova
7.	Maryna Dudko
8.	Tetyana Kobzenko (c)

No.	Player	Pos.	Age
9.	Svitlana Kolomiyets
10.	Natalya Vasyukova
11.	Elvira Dzhemilova
12.	Zhanna Savenko
13.	Maryna Litvinchuk
14.	Tetyano Salenko
15.	Svitlana Petrenko
16.	Olha Fisuyn

Ukraine took only sixteen players to the World Cup

== Pool B ==
=== Australia ===
Head Coach: David Bell

No.	Player	Pos.	Age
2.	Louise Dobson	DF	30
3.	Karen Smith	MF	23
5.	Ngaire Smith	FW	23
7.	Peta Gallagher	FW	24
8.	Susannah Harris	FW	17
10.	Bianca Netzler	MF	26
13.	Wendy Alcorn	MF	22
14.	Nicole Arrold	DF	21
17.	Rachel Imison	GK	23

No.	Player	Pos.	Age
20.	Carmel Bakurski	DF	26
21.	Nina Bonner	GK	30
24.	Angie Skirving	DF	21
25.	Melanie Twitt	MF	25
28.	Julie Towers	DF	26
29.	Tammy Cole	DF	29
30.	Sarah Taylor	MF	21
31.	Katrina Powell (c)	MF	30
32.	Nikki Hudson	FW	26

=== England ===
Head Coach: Tricia Heberle

No.	Player	Pos.	Age
1.	Carolyn Reid	GK
2.	Hilary Rose	GK
3.	Jenny Bimson	DF
4.	Jane Smith
5.	Denise Marston-Smith
6.	Melanie Clewlow
7.	Helen Grant
8.	Anna Bennett
9.	Mandy Nicholson

No.	Player	Pos.	Age
10.	Lucilla Wright
11.	Kate Walsh
12.	Frances Houslop
13.	Helen Richardson
14.	Rachel Walker
15.	Alex Danson
16.	Leisa King
17.	Sarah Blanks
18.	Anne Panter

=== Ireland ===
Head Coach: Riet Kuper

No.	Player	Pos.	Age
1.	Tara Browne	GK
2.	Angela Platt	GK
3.	Arlene Boyles
4.	Jennifer Burke
5.	Linda Caulfield
6.	Eimear Cregan
7.	Karen Humphreys
8.	Rachel Kohler
9.	Laura Lee

No.	Player	Pos.	Age
10.	Pamela Magill
13.	Claire McMahon
14.	Lynsey McVicker
15.	Ciara O'Brien
16.	Jill Orbinson
18.	Daphne Sixsmith
19.	Linda O'Neill
21.	Katharine Maybin
23.	Catherine Murray

=== Japan ===
Head Coach: Akihiro Kuga

No.	Player	Pos.	Age
1.	Rie Terazono	GK
2.	Keiko Miura (c)
3.	Akemi Kato
4.	Yukari Yamamoto
5.	Sachimi Iwao
6.	Chie Kimura
7.	Yuka Ogura
8.	Sakae Morimoto
9.	Kaori Chiba

No.	Player	Pos.	Age
10.	Naoko Saito
12.	Nami Miyazaki	GK
14.	Akiko Kitada
15.	Erika Esaki
16.	Mayumi Ono
17.	Asuka Chiba
18.	Tomomi Komori
19.	Rika Komazawa
20.	Ai Sasaki

=== Netherlands ===
Head Coach: Marc Lammers

No.	Player	Pos.	Age
1.	Clarinda Sinnige	GK
2.	Lisanne de Roever	GK
3.	Macha van der Vaart	MF
4.	Fatima Moreira de Melo	FW
6.	Maartje Scheepstra	MF
7.	Miek van Geenhuizen	MF
8.	Karlijn Petri	FW
10.	Mijntje Donners (c)	FW
11.	Ageeth Boomgaardt	DF

No.	Player	Pos.	Age
13.	Minke Smabers	MF
14.	Ellis Verbakel	MF
15.	Janneke Schopman	DF
16.	Chantal de Bruijn	DF
18.	Minke Booij	DF
19.	Aniek van Hees	MF
21.	Lieve van Kessel	FW
23.	Kim Lammers	FW
24.	Femke Kooijman	MF

=== South Africa ===
Head Coach: Ros Howell

No.	Player	Pos.	Age
1.	Caroline Jack	GK
2.	Inke van Wyk	GK
6.	Anli Kotze
7.	Natalie Haynes
9.	Marsha Marescia
10.	Johke Koornhof
11.	Sophie Mayer
12.	Lindsey Carlisle (c)
14.	Kerry Bee

No.	Player	Pos.	Age
15.	Pietie Coetzee
16.	Jenny Wilson
18.	Juliet Ranyane
20.	Bronwyn Ross
21.	Julia Henry
22.	Luntu Ntloko
23.	Melinda Vos
30.	Sharne Wehmeyer
31.	Susan Wessels-Webber

=== Spain ===
Head Coach: Jack Holtman

No.	Player	Pos.	Age
1.	María Jesús Rosa	GK	22
2.	Nuria Moreno
3.	Marta Prat
5.	Monica Rueda
6.	Silvia Bonastre
7.	María Carmen Martín
8.	Amanda González
9.	Silvia Muñoz	FW
10.	Lucía López

No.	Player	Pos.	Age
11.	María del Mar Feito (c)
12.	Maider Telleria
13.	Elena Urkizu
14.	María Romagosa
15.	Erdoitza Goikoetxea
17.	Núria Camón	MF
18.	Ana Pérez
19.	Isabel Barguño
20.	Raquel Huertas
