= 2004 Women's Field Hockey Olympic Qualifier =

Qualification for the 2004 Summer Olympics

Tournament details
- Host country: New Zealand
- City: Auckland
- Dates: 19–28 March
- Teams: 10
- Venue: Lloyd Elsmore Hockey Stadium

Final positions
- Champions: Japan
- Runner-up: Spain
- Third place: New Zealand

Tournament statistics
- Matches played: 29
- Goals scored: 92 (3.17 per match)
- Top scorer: (Japan) Sakae Morimoto (7 goals)
- Best player: (Ukraine) Tetyana Kobzenko

The 2004 Women's Hockey Olympic Qualifier was held in Auckland, New Zealand from 19 to 28 March 2004. The top five teams qualified to the 2004 Summer Olympics in Athens, Greece.

== Squads ==
Germany

Head Coach: Markus Weise

2. Tina Bachmann
4. Mandy Haase
5. Nadine Ernsting-Krienke
8. Kerstin Hoyer
9. Friederike Barth
10. Silke Müller
13. Marion Rodewald (c)
15. Heike Lätzsch
16. Fanny Rinne
17. Louisa Walter (GK)
18. Anke Kühn
19. Britta von Livonius
20. Alexandra Kollmar
21. Badri Latif
22. Miriam Schmid
23. Julia Zwehl (GK)
27. Sonja Lehmann
32. Franziska Gude
Great Britain

Head Coach: Bobby Crutchley

1. Carolyn Reid (GK)
2. Hilary Rose (GK)
3. Anna Bennett
4. Jane Smith
5. Crista Cullen
6. Melanie Clewlow
7. Helen Grant
8. Lucilla Wright
9. Mandy Nicholson
10. Rhona Simpson
11. Kate Walsh (c)
12. Emma Rochlin
13. Jennie Bimson
14. Rachel Walker
15. Fiona Greenham
16. Leisa King
17. Sarah Blanks
18. Linda Clement
Ireland

Head Coach: Riet Kuper

1. Nicky King (GK)
2. Angela Platt (GK)
3. Elaine Bromell
4. Fiona Connery
5. Linda Caulfield
6. Eimear Cregan
7. Suzanne Beaney
9. Bridget McKeever
11. Jenny McDonough
13. Nicky McCaughern
14. Lynsey McVicker (c)
15. Ciara O'Brien
16. Jill Orbinson
17. Nikki Symmons
18. Deirdre Casey
20. Kristin Farrell
21. Katharine Maybin
24. Jenny Burke
Japan

Head Coach: Kazunori Kobayashi

1. Rie Terazono (GK)
2. Keiko Miura (c)
3. Akemi Kato
4. Yukari Yamamoto
5. Sachimi Iwao
6. Chie Kimura
7. Yuka Ogura
8. Sakae Morimoto
9. Kaori Chiba
10. Naoko Saito
11. Tomomi Komori
12. Nami Miyazaki (GK)
13. Akiko Kitada
14. Rika Ishida
15. Emi Sakurai
16. Rika Komazawa
19. Megumi Ohmura
20. Miyuki Nakagawa
New Zealand

Head Coach: Ian Rutledge

1. Kayla Sharland
2. Emily Naylor
5. Rachel Sutherland
6. Meredith Orr
8. Jaimee Provan
9. Leisen Jobe
10. Lizzy Igasan
11. Stacey Carr
12. Lisa Walton
14. Suzie Muirhead (c)
15. Beth Jurgeleit (GK)
16. Helen Clarke (GK)
17. Caryn Paewai
18. Diana Weavers
21. Niniwa Roberts
22. Rachel Robertson
23. Tara Drysdale
28. Karen Syddall
Russia

Head Coach: Valentina Apelganets

1. Anna Radomskaya (GK)
2. Ekaterina Cherkasova
3. Galina Timshina
4. Natalia Vershinina
5. Alexandra Pershina
6. Elena Kazakova
7. Natalia Gorbachkova
8. Tatiana Lastochkina
9. Elena Apelganets
10. Tatiana Vasyukova (c)
11. Svetlana Grigoreva
12. Ekaterina Rastorgoueva
13. Nadezda Chegurdaeva
14. Marina Chegurdaeva
15. Olga Shentsova
16. Galina Basaychuk
17. Natalia Zaitchenko
18. Oxana Serezhkina (GK)
South Korea

Head Coach: Lim Heung-sin

1. Park Yong-Sook (GK)
2. Kim Yun-Mi
3. Lee Jin-Hee
4. Yoo Hee-Joo
6. Kim Jung-Ahn
7. Han Sung-Mi
8. Lee Mi-Seong
9. Park Mi-Hyun
10. Oh Ko-Woon
11. Kim Seong-Eun (c)
13. Moon Myung-Seon
14. Park Seon-Mi
15. Kim Jin-Kyoung
16. Lim Ju-Young (GK)
17. Kang Bo-Kyung
18. Park Jeong-Sook
19. Yoon Deok-Hee
21. Kim Jung-Hee
Spain

Head Coach: Pablo Usoz

1. María Jesús Rosa (GK)
3. Rocío Ybarra
4. Barbara Malda
5. Mónica Rueda
6. Silvia Bonastre
7. María del Carmen Martín
8. Marta Prat
9. Silvia Muñoz
10. Lucía López
11. María del Mar Feito (c)
12. Maider Tellería
15. Erdoitza Goikoetxea
16. Lara Domenech Baldó
17. Núria Camón
18. Ana Pérez
19. Maider Luengo (GK)
20. Raquel Huertas
21. Esther Termens
Ukraine

Head Coach: Tetyana Zhuk

1. Iryna Zhukova (GK)
2. Viktoriya Novik
3. Lyudmyla Vyhanyayko
4. Olena Fritche
5. Olga Gulenko
6. Olha Hryzodub
7. Maryna Dudko
8. Tetyana Kobzenko (c)
9. Svitlana Kolomiyets
10. Natalya Vsayukova
11. Elvira Dzhemilova
12. Zhanna Savenko
13. Maryna Litvinchuk
14. Tetyana Salenko
15. Yana Vorushylo
16. Olga Fisyun (GK)
United States

Head Coach: Beth Anders

1. Tamika Smith
2. Angie Loy
3. Kristen McCann
4. Margaret Storrar (GK)
5. Tara Jelley
7. Tracey Larson
9. Tracey Fuchs
10. Tiffany Snow
11. Katherine Beach
13. Keli Smith
14. Abbey Woolley
17. Carrie Lingo
21. April Fronzoni
22. Kate Barber
23. Meredith Keller
24. Dina Rizzo
25. Amy Tran (GK)
26. Kristi Gannon

== Umpires ==
- Chieko Akiyama (JPN)
- Judith Barnesby (AUS)
- Peri Buckley (AUS)
- Renée Cohen (NED)
- Ute Conen (GER)
- Carolina de la Fuente (ARG)
- Marelize de Klerk (RSA)
- Jean Duncan (GBR)
- Lyn Farrell (NZL)
- Sarah Garnett (NZL)
- Jun Kentwell (USA)
- Minka Woolley (AUS)

== Results ==
=== Preliminary round ===
==== Pool A ====
Pos	Team	Pld	W	D	L	GF	GA	GD	Pts	Status
1	New Zealand (H)	4	2	2	0	11	6	+5	8	Advanced to Semi-finals
2	Germany	4	2	2	0	6	4	+2	8	Advanced to Semi-finals
3	Great Britain	4	2	1	1	6	4	+2	7	
4	Ireland	4	1	1	2	3	8	−5	4	
5	Ukraine	4	0	0	4	3	7	−4	0	

Source: Todor66
Rules for classification: 1) Points; 2) Goal difference; 3) Matches won; 4) Goals for; 5) Head-to-head result.
(H) Hosts

19 March 2004
12:00

Ukraine	0–1	Ireland
	Report	Burke 20'

Umpires:
Peri Buckley (AUS)
Jun Kentwell (USA)

19 March 2004
16:30

New Zealand	2–2	Great Britain
Roberts 53'; Muirhead 55'	Report	Clewlow 8'; Grant 10'

Umpires:
Renée Cohen (NED)
Minka Woolley (AUS)

20 March 2004
10:00

Ukraine	1–2	Germany
Vorushylo 39'	Report	Kollmar 57', 58'

Umpires:
Chieko Akiyama (JPN)
Carolina de la Fuente (ARG)

20 March 2004
15:00

Ireland	1–5	New Zealand
McDonough 37'	Report	Carr 17'; Sharland 29'; Provan 37', 51'; Roberts 47'

Umpires:
Marelize de Klerk (RSA)
Judith Barnesby (AUS)

21 March 2004
12:30

Germany	2–1	Great Britain
Ernsting-Krienke 7'; Kühn 24'	Report	Walker 28'

Umpires:
Peri Buckley (AUS)
Judith Barnesby (AUS)

21 March 2004
16:30

New Zealand	3–2	Ukraine
Roberts 40', 57'; Walton 48'	Report	Kolomiyets 9'; Savenko 12'

Umpires:
Minka Woolley (AUS)
Ute Conen (GER)

23 March 2004
17:00

Ireland	1–1	Germany
Cregan 30'	Report	Rodewald 35'

Umpires:
Minka Woolley (AUS)
Marelize de Klerk (RSA)

23 March 2004
19:00

Great Britain	1–0	Ukraine
Bennett 52'	Report

Umpires:
Chieko Akiyama (JPN)
Carolina de la Fuente (ARG)

24 March 2004
17:00

Great Britain	2–0	Ireland
Bennett 19'; Smith 65'	Report

Umpires:
Chieko Akiyama (JPN)
Minka Woolley (AUS)

24 March 2004
19:00

Germany	1–1	New Zealand
Lätzsch 34'	Report	Walton 54'

Umpires:
Judith Barnesby (AUS)
Renée Cohen (NED)

==== Pool B ====
Pos	Team	Pld	W	D	L	GF	GA	GD	Pts	Status
1	Japan	4	3	0	1	13	3	+10	9	Advanced to Semi-finals
2	Spain	4	3	0	1	5	3	+2	9	Advanced to Semi-finals
3	United States	4	2	1	1	11	4	+7	7	
4	South Korea	4	1	1	2	7	6	+1	4	
5	Russia	4	0	0	4	1	21	−20	0	

Source: Todor66
Rules for classification: 1) Points; 2) Goal difference; 3) Matches won; 4) Goals for; 5) Head-to-head result.

19 March 2004
10:00

Japan	6–1	Russia
Komori 8'; Morimoto 30', 52'; Chiba 34'; Komazawa 48'; Saito 53'	Report	M. Chegurdaeva 38'

Umpires:
Carolina de la Fuente (ARG)
Lyn Farrell (NZL)

19 March 2004
14:30

Spain	1–0	South Korea
López 25'	Report

Umpires:
Marelize de Klerk (RSA)
Sarah Garnett (NZL)

20 March 2004
12:00

United States	1–3	Japan
Fuchs 34'	Report	Komazawa 17'; Morimoto 47'; Iwao 55'

Umpires:
Ute Conen (GER)
Sarah Garnett (NZL)

20 March 2004
17:00

Russia	0–3	Spain
	Report	Termens 13'; Feito 39'; Muñoz 54'

Umpires:
Peri Buckley (AUS)
Jean Duncan (USA)

21 March 2004
15:00

South Korea	1–1	United States
Park J. 60'	Report	Fuchs 44'

Umpires:
Chieko Akiyama (JPN)
Jean Duncan (GBR)

22 March 2004
14:30

South Korea	6–0	Russia
Kim Y. 13', 34'; Kim S. 16', 41', 62'; Lee J. 45'	Report

Umpires:
Marelize de Klerk (RSA)
Jun Kentwell (USA)

23 March 2004
12:00

Spain	1–0	Japan
López 44'	Report

Umpires:
Ute Conen (GER)
Renée Cohen (NED)

23 March 2004
14:00

Russia	0–6	United States
	Report	Fuchs 2', 31'; Larson 15'; McCann 24'; Barber 66'; K. Smith 69'

Umpires:
Lyn Farrell (NZL)
Sarah Garnett (NZL)

24 March 2004
12:00

Japan	4–0	South Korea
Saito 9'; Morimoto 15', 65'; Miura 41'	Report

Umpires:
Sarah Garnett (NZL)
Peri Buckley (AUS)

24 March 2004
14:00

United States	3–0	Spain
Barber 16'; Fuchs 21'; Fronzoni 58'	Report

Umpires:
Lyn Farrell (NZL)
Jean Duncan (GBR)

=== Classification round ===
==== Ninth and tenth place ====
27 March 2004
09:00

Ukraine	0–2	Russia
	Report	Basaychuk 19', 20'

Umpires:
Jean Duncan (GBR)
Judith Barnesby (AUS)

==== Fifth to eighth place classification ====
Crossover
26 March
Great Britain	0
South Korea	2
26 March
United States	2
Ireland	1

Fifth place
27 March
South Korea	4
United States	0
Seventh place
27 March
Great Britain	4
Ireland	1

===== Crossover =====
26 March 2004
09:00

Great Britain	0–2	South Korea
	Report	Kim J. 19'; Park J. 29'

Umpires:
Carolina de la Fuente (ARG)
Minka Woolley (AUS)

26 March 2004
12:00

United States	2–1 (a.e.t.)	Ireland
K. Smith 37'; Fuchs 81'	Report	Cregan 45'

Umpires:
Sarah Garnett (NZL)
Judith Barnesby (AUS)

===== Seventh and eighth place =====
27 March 2004
12:00

Great Britain	4–1	Ireland
Simpson 9'; Wright 15', 53'; Bennett 54'	Report	Farrell 67'

Umpires:
Ute Conen (GER)
Jun Kentwell (USA)

===== Fifth and sixth place =====
27 March 2004
15:00

South Korea	4–0	United States
Kim Y. 14'; Lee M. 17'; Park M. 29'; Kim S. 56'	Report

Umpires:
Marelize de Klerk (RSA)
Renée Cohen (NED)

==== First to fourth place classification ====
Semi-finals
26 March
New Zealand	0
Spain	1
26 March
Japan	3
Germany	0

Final
28 March
Spain	0
Japan	1
Third place
28 March
New Zealand	3
Germany	2

===== Semi-finals =====
26 March 2004
16:00

New Zealand	0–1	Spain
	Report	Tellería 53'

Umpires:
Chieko Akiyama (JPN)
Ute Conen (GER)

26 March 2004
19:00

Japan	3–0	Germany
Morimoto 10', 47'; Chiba 63'	Report

Umpires:
Lyn Farrell (NZL)
Jean Duncan (GBR)

===== Third and fourth place =====
28 March 2004
12:15

New Zealand	3–2	Germany
Muirhead 44'; Provan 45'; Roberts 69'	Report	Lätzsch 6'; Ernsting-Krienke 37'

Umpires:
Renée Cohen (NED)
Peri Buckley (AUS)

===== Final =====
28 March 2004
15:15

Spain	0–1	Japan
	Report	Saito 7'

Umpires:
Carolina de la Fuente (ARG)
Lyn Farrell (NZL)

== Awards ==
Top Goalscorer	Player of the Tournament	Fair Play
(Japan) Sakae Morimoto	(Ukraine) Tetyana Kobzenko	New Zealand

== Final standings ==
Pos	Team	Pld	W	D	L	GF	GA	GD	Pts	Status
1st place, gold medalist(s)	Japan	6	5	0	1	17	3	+14	15	Qualified for 2004 Summer Olympics
2nd place, silver medalist(s)	Spain	6	4	0	2	6	4	+2	12	Qualified for 2004 Summer Olympics
3rd place, bronze medalist(s)	New Zealand (H)	6	3	2	1	14	9	+5	11	Qualified for 2004 Summer Olympics
4	Germany	6	2	2	2	8	10	−2	8	Qualified for 2004 Summer Olympics
5	South Korea	6	3	1	2	13	6	+7	10	Qualified for 2004 Summer Olympics
6	United States	6	3	1	2	13	9	+4	10	
7	Great Britain	6	3	1	2	10	7	+3	10	
8	Ireland	6	1	1	4	5	14	−9	4	
9	Russia	5	1	0	4	3	21	−18	3	
10	Ukraine	5	0	0	5	3	9	−6	0	

Source: Todor66
(H) Hosts

== Goalscorers ==
There were 92 goals scored in 29 matches, for an average of 3.17 goals per match.

7 goals

- (Japan) Sakae Morimoto

6 goals

- (United States) Tracey Fuchs

5 goals

- (New Zealand) Niniwa Roberts

4 goals

- (South Korea) Kim Seong-Eun

3 goals

- (United Kingdom) Anna Bennett
- (Japan) Naoko Saito
- (New Zealand) Jaimee Provan
- (South Korea) Kim Yun-Mi

2 goals

- (Germany) Nadine Ernsting-Krienke
- (Germany) Alexandra Kollmar
- (Germany) Heike Lätzsch
- (United Kingdom) Lucilla Wright
- (Ireland) Eimear Cregan
- (Japan) Kaori Chiba
- (Japan) Rika Komazawa
- (New Zealand) Suzanne Muirhead
- (New Zealand) Lisa Walton
- (Russia) Galina Basaychuk
- (South Korea) Park Jeong-Sook
- (Spain) Lucía López
- (United States) Kate Barber
- (United States) Keli Smith

1 goal

- (Germany) Anke Kühn
- (Germany) Marion Rodewald
- (United Kingdom) Melanie Clewlow
- (United Kingdom) Helen Grant
- (United Kingdom) Rhona Simpson
- (United Kingdom) Jane Smith
- (United Kingdom) Rachel Walker
- (Ireland) Jennifer Burke
- (Ireland) Kristin Farrell
- (Ireland) Jennifer McDonough
- (Japan) Sachimi Iwao
- (Japan) Tomomi Komori
- (Japan) Keiko Miura
- (New Zealand) Stacey Carr
- (New Zealand) Kayla Sharland
- (Russia) Marina Chegurdaeva
- (South Korea) Lee Jin-Hee
- (South Korea) Kim Jin-Kyoung
- (South Korea) Park Mi-Hyun
- (South Korea) Lee Mi-Seong
- (Spain) María del Mar Feito
- (Spain) Silvia Muñoz
- (Spain) Maider Tellería
- (Spain) Esther Termens
- (Ukraine) Svitlana Kolomiyets
- (Ukraine) Zhanna Savenko
- (Ukraine) Yana Vorushylo
- (United States) April Fronzoni
- (United States) Tracey Larson
- (United States) Kristen McCann
