= Field hockey at the 2004 Summer Olympics – Women's tournament =

Women's field hockey at the 2004 Summer Olympics
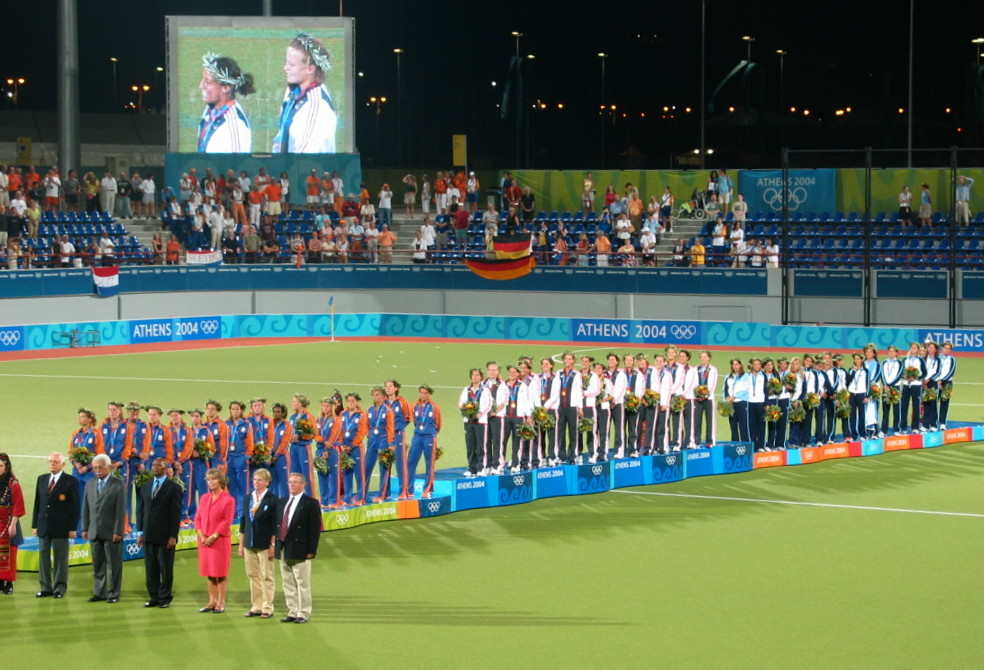
- Victory ceremony

Tournament details
- Host country: Greece
- City: Athens
- Dates: 14 – 26 August
- Teams: 10
- Venue: Hellinikon Olympic Hockey Centre

Final positions
- Champions: Germany (1st title)
- Runner-up: Netherlands
- Third place: Argentina

Tournament statistics
- Matches played: 29
- Goals scored: 105 (3.62 per match)
- Top scorer(s): (Netherlands) Mijntje Donners (South Africa) Jennifer Wilson (5 goals)

The women's field hockey tournament at the 2004 Summer Olympics was the 7th edition of the field hockey event for women at the Summer Olympic Games. It was held over an eleven-day period beginning on 16 August, and culminating with the medal finals on 26 August. All games were played at the hockey centre within the Hellinikon Olympic Complex in Athens, Greece.

Germany won the gold medal for the first time after defeating the Netherlands 2–1 in the final. Argentina won the bronze medal by defeating China 1–0.

== Qualification ==
Each of the continental champions from the five federations received an automatic berth. Along with the five teams qualifying through the Olympic Qualification Tournament, ten teams competed in this tournament.

Dates	Event	Location	Qualifier(s)
5–11 October 2002	2002 Asian Games	Busan, South Korea	China
25–31 May 2003	2003 Oceania Cup	Melbourne, Australia; Auckland and Whangārei, New Zealand	Australia
3–13 August 2003	2003 Pan American Games	Santo Domingo, Dominican Republic	Argentina
1–13 September 2003	2003 EuroHockey Nations Championship	Barcelona, Spain	Netherlands
7–17 October 2003	2003 All-Africa Games	Abuja, Nigeria	South Africa
19–28 March 2004	Olympic Qualification Tournament	Manukau, New Zealand	Japan; Spain; New Zealand; Germany; South Korea

Although the host nation would have qualified automatically as well, the International Hockey Federation (FIH) and the International Olympic Committee (IOC) refused to give them an automatic berth due to the standard of hockey in Greece. Greece appealed the decision to the Court of Arbitration for Sport (CAS), however it was turned down. Greece's first option to gain a place at the Olympics was by qualifying for the EuroHockey Nations Championship held in 2003. As they did not qualify for this tournament their last option was to beat Russia, the last ranked team of the Olympic Qualification Tournament in a best of three play-off competition. Russia would have kept its place in the Qualifier regardless of whether it won or lost against Greece. There would, however, have been four places at stake at the tournament if Greece had qualified, rather than five. Eventually Greece withdrew from participating in the 11-14 March 2004 play-off competition in Auckland, New Zealand, due to "explicit financial reasons".

== Umpires ==
- Chieko Akiyama (JPN)
- Renée Cohen (NED)
- Marelize de Klerk (RSA)
- Jean Duncan (GBR)
- Sarah Garnett (NZL)
- Gina Spitaleri (ITA)
- Julie Ashton-Lucy (AUS)
- Ute Conen (GER)
- Carolina de la Fuente (ARG)
- Lyn Farrell (NZL)
- Soledad Iparraguirre (ARG)
- Minka Woolley (AUS)

== Results ==
All times are Eastern European Time (UTC+2)

=== Preliminary round ===
==== Pool A ====
Pos	Team	Pld	W	D	L	GF	GA	GD	Pts	Qualification
1	China	4	4	0	0	11	2	+9	12	Semi-finals
2	Argentina	4	3	0	1	12	4	+8	9	Semi-finals
3	Japan	4	2	0	2	5	7	−2	6	
4	New Zealand	4	1	0	3	3	9	−6	3	
5	Spain	4	0	0	4	3	12	−9	0	

Source: FIH
Rules for classification: 1) Points; 2) Matches won; 3) Goal difference; 4) Goals for; 5) Head-to-head result.

14 August 2004
10:30

China	3–0	Japan
Fu 7'; Tang 39'; Chen Qi. 67'	Report

Umpires:
Marelize de Klerk (RSA)
Renee Cohen (NED)

14 August 2004
20:00

Argentina	4–0	Spain
Stepnik 11'; Rognoni 25'; González Oliva 28'; Oneto 69'	Report

Umpires:
Julie Ashton-Lucy (AUS)
Ute Conen (GER)

16 August 2004
08:30

Japan	1–3	Argentina
Komazawa 27'	Report	Arrondo 19'; García 37'; Di Giacomo 58'

Umpires:
Minka Woolley (AUS)
Lyn Farrell (NZL)

16 August 2004
18:00

New Zealand	0–2	China
	Report	Ma 16'; Tang 41'

Umpires:
Jean Duncan (GBR)
Soledad Iparraguirre (ARG)

18 August 2004
08:30

China	3–0	Spain
Tang 14'; Fu 35'; Gao 58'	Report

Umpires:
Sarah Garnett (NZL)
Minka Woolley (AUS)

18 August 2004
20:00

Japan	2–0	New Zealand
Komori 18', 52'	Report

Umpires:
Carolina de la Fuente (ARG)
Gina Spitaleri (ITA)

20 August 2004
10:30

New Zealand	0–3	Argentina
	Report	Aymar 8'; Oneto 38'; García 53'

Umpires:
Chieko Akiyama (JPN)
Julie Ashton-Lucy (AUS)

20 August 2004
20:00

Spain	1–2	Japan
Termens 67'	Report	Morimoto 5'; Komazawa 34'

Umpires:
Jean Duncan (GBR)
Ute Conen (GER)

22 August 2004
10:30

Spain	2–3	New Zealand
Goikoetxea 21', 40'	Report	Provan 21'; Roberts-Lang 30'; Igasan 50'

Umpires:
Chieko Akiyama (JPN)
Julie Ashton-Lucy (AUS)

22 August 2004
18:00

Argentina	2–3	China
Aymar 17', 34'	Report	Ma 9'; Fu 16'; Tang 47'

Umpires:
Renee Cohen (NED)
Minka Woolley (AUS)

==== Pool B ====
Pos	Team	Pld	W	D	L	GF	GA	GD	Pts	Qualification
1	Netherlands	4	4	0	0	14	5	+9	12	Semi-finals
2	Germany	4	2	0	2	6	10	−4	6	Semi-finals
3	South Korea	4	1	1	2	9	8	+1	4	
4	Australia	4	1	1	2	6	5	+1	4	
5	South Africa	4	1	0	3	5	12	−7	3	

Source: FIH
Rules for classification: 1) Points; 2) Matches won; 3) Goal difference; 4) Goals for; 5) Head-to-head result.

14 August 2004
08:30

Netherlands	6–2	South Africa
Donners 6', 19', 37'; Boomgaardt 15'; Moreira de Melo 23'; Scheepstra 25'	Report	Wilson 7', 53'

Umpires:
Lyn Farrell (NZL)
Gina Spitaleri (ITA)

14 August 2004
18:00

Australia	1–2	Germany
Towers 58'	Report	Ernsting-Krienke 21'; Müller 34'

Umpires:
Soledad Iparraguirre (ARG)
Chieko Akiyama (JPN)

16 August 2004
10:30

South Africa	0–3	Australia
	Report	Towers 28'; Faulkner 34'; Gallagher 59'

Umpires:
Sarah Garnett (NZL)
Ute Conen (GER)

16 August 2004
20:00

South Korea	2–3	Netherlands
Kim Ji. 19'; Park J. 57'	Report	Van der Vaart 26', 35'; Booij 40'

Umpires:
Caroline de la Fuente (ARG)
Julie Ashton-Lucy (AUS)

18 August 2004
10:30

Netherlands	4–1	Germany
Scheepstra 7'; Boomgaardt 19'; Van Geenhuizen 21'; Karres 29'	Report	Ernsting-Krienke 40'

Umpires:
Chieko Akiyama (JPN)
Marelize de Klerk (RSA)

18 August 2004
18:00

South Africa	0–3	South Korea
	Report	Ko 17'; Lee S. 35'; Kim Y. 46'

Umpires:
Jean Duncan (GBR)
Renee Cohen (NED)

20 August 2004
08:30

South Korea	2–2	Australia
Park M. 31'; Kim S. 46'	Report	Dobson 6'; Powell 43'

Umpires:
Soledad Iparraguirre (ARG)
Marelize de Klerk (RSA)

20 August 2004
18:00

Germany	0–3	South Africa
	Report	Wehmeyer 4'; Coetzee 45'; Wilson 56'

Umpires:
Lyn Farrell (NZL)
Sarah Garnett (NZL)

22 August 2004
08:30

Germany	3–2	South Korea
Kühn 11'; Gude 30'; Casaretto 59'	Report	Park M. 32'; Kim S. 70'

Umpires:
Carolina de la Fuente (ARG)
Soledad Iparraguirre (ARG)

22 August 2004
20:00

Australia	0–1	Netherlands
	Report	Donners 47'

Umpires:
Marelize de Klerk (RSA)
Gina Spitaleri (ITA)

=== Classification round ===
==== Ninth and tenth place ====
27 August 2004
09:00

Spain	3–4 (a.e.t.)	South Africa
Ybarra 23'; Feito 49'; Termens 60'	Report	Coetzee 29'; Pholo 33'; Wilson 47', 73'

Umpires:
Lyn Farrell (NZL)
Minka Woolley (AUS)

==== Fifth- to eighth-place classification ====
Crossover
24 August 2004
South Korea	2
New Zealand (a.e.t.)	3
24 August 2004
Japan	1
Australia	3

Fifth place
27 August 2004
New Zealand	0
Australia	3
Seventh place
27 August 2004
South Korea	3
Japan	1

===== Crossover =====
24 August 2004
08:30

South Korea	2–3 (a.e.t.)	New Zealand
Kim Y. 44'; Park M. 46'	Report	Roberts-Lang 4'; Muirhead 8'; Walton 80'

Umpires:
Ute Conen (GER)
Jean Duncan (GBR)

24 August 2004
11:00

Japan	1–3	Australia
Komori 15'	Report	Gallagher 27'; Faulkner 33'; Powell 37'

Umpires:
Sarah Garnett (NZL)
Carolina de la Fuente (ARG)

===== Seventh and eighth place =====
27 August 2004
08:30

South Korea	3–1	Japan
Oh. 12', 18'; Kim Ji. 19'	Report	Miura 35+'

Umpires:
Carolina de la Fuente (ARG)
Julie Ashton-Lucy (AUS)

===== Fifth and sixth place =====
27 August 2004
11:00

New Zealand	0–3	Australia
	Report	Towers 14'; Powell 42', 67'

Umpires:
Chieko Akiyama (JPN)
Gina Spitaleri (ITA)

==== First- to fourth-place classification ====
Semi-finals
24 August 2004
Netherlands (pen.)	2 (4)
Argentina	2 (2)
24 August 2004
China	0 (3)
Germany (pen.)	0 (4)

Gold-medal match
26 August 2004
Netherlands	1
Germany	2
Bronze-medal match
26 August 2004
Argentina	1
China	0

===== Semi-finals =====
24 August 2004
18:00

Netherlands	2–2 (a.e.t.)	Argentina
Karres 41'; Donners 45'	Report	García 17'; Aicega 68'
Penalties
Schopman (penalty shoot-out scored); Boomgaardt (penalty shoot-out scored); Donners (penalty shoot-out scored); Van Kessel (penalty shoot-out scored)	4–2	(penalty shoot-out scored) Margalot; (penalty shoot-out missed) Rognoni; (penalty shoot-out scored) Aymar; (penalty shoot-out missed) Stepnik

Umpires:
Lyn Farrell (NZL)
Minka Woolley (AUS)

24 August 2004
20:30

China	0–0 (a.e.t.)	Germany
	Report
Penalties
Fu (penalty shoot-out scored); Gao (penalty shoot-out missed); Mai (penalty shoot-out scored); Tang (penalty shoot-out scored); Zhou (penalty shoot-out missed)	3–4	(penalty shoot-out scored) Rinne; (penalty shoot-out scored) Klecker; (penalty shoot-out scored) Bachmann; (penalty shoot-out scored) Keller; (penalty shoot-out missed) Gude

Umpires:
Marelize de Klerk (RSA)
Soledad Iparraguirre (ARG)

===== Bronze medal match =====
26 August 2004
18:00

Argentina	1–0	China
Aymar 70'	Report

Umpires:
Renee Cohen (NED)
Ute Conen (GER)

===== Gold-medal match =====
26 August 2004
20:30

Netherlands	1–2	Germany
Scheepstra 38'	Report	Kühn 6'; Gude 20'

Umpires:
Marelize de Klerk (RSA)
Soledad Iparraguirre (ARG)

== Statistics ==
=== Final ranking ===
Pos	Grp	Team	Pld	W	D	L	GF	GA	GD	Pts	Final result
1	B	Germany	6	3	1	2	8	11	−3	10	Gold medal
2	B	Netherlands	6	4	1	1	17	9	+8	13	Silver medal
3	A	Argentina	6	4	1	1	15	6	+9	13	Bronze medal
4	A	China	6	4	1	1	11	3	+8	13	
5	B	Australia	6	3	1	2	12	6	+6	10	
6	A	New Zealand	6	2	0	4	6	14	−8	6	
7	B	South Korea	6	2	1	3	14	12	+2	7	
8	A	Japan	6	2	0	4	7	13	−6	6	
9	B	South Africa	5	2	0	3	9	15	−6	6	
10	A	Spain	5	0	0	5	6	16	−10	0	

Source: FIH

=== Goalscorers ===
There were 105 goals scored in 29 matches, for an average of 3.62 goals per match.

5 goals

- (Netherlands) Mijntje Donners
- (South Africa) Jennifer Wilson

4 goals

- (Argentina) Luciana Aymar
- (Australia) Katrina Powell
- (China) Tang Chunling

3 goals

- (Argentina) Soledad García
- (Australia) Julie Towers
- (China) Fu Baorong
- (Japan) Tomomi Komori
- (Netherlands) Maartje Scheepstra
- (South Korea) Park Mi-Hyun

2 goals

- (Argentina) Vanina Oneto
- (Australia) Suzanne Faulkner
- (Australia) Peta Gallagher
- (China) Ma Yibo
- (Germany) Nadine Ernsting-Krienke
- (Germany) Franziska Gude
- (Germany) Anke Kühn
- (Japan) Rika Komazawa
- (Netherlands) Ageeth Boomgaardt
- (Netherlands) Sylvia Karres
- (Netherlands) Macha van der Vaart
- (New Zealand) Niniwa Roberts-Lang
- (South Africa) Pietie Coetzee
- (South Korea) Kim Jin-Kyoung
- (South Korea) Oh Ko-Woon
- (South Korea) Kim Seong-Eun
- (South Korea) Kim Yun-Mi
- (Spain) Erdoitza Goikoetxea
- (Spain) Esther Termens

1 goal

- (Argentina) Magdalena Aicega
- (Argentina) Inés Arrondo
- (Argentina) Marina di Giacomo
- (Argentina) Mariana González Oliva
- (Argentina) Cecilia Rognoni
- (Argentina) Ayelén Stepnik
- (Australia) Louise Dobson
- (China) Gao Lihua
- (China) Chen Qiuqi
- (Germany) Caroline Casaretto
- (Germany) Silke Müller
- (Japan) Keiko Miura
- (Japan) Sakae Morimoto
- (Netherlands) Minke Booij
- (Netherlands) Miek van Geenhuizen
- (Netherlands) Fatima Moreira de Melo
- (New Zealand) Elizabeth Igasan
- (New Zealand) Suzanne Muirhead
- (New Zealand) Jaimee Provan
- (New Zealand) Lisa Walton
- (South Africa) Tsoanelo Pholo
- (South Africa) Sharne Wehmeyer
- (South Korea) Park Jeong-Sook
- (South Korea) Ko Kwang-Min
- (South Korea) Lee Seon-Ok
- (Spain) María del Mar Feito
- (Spain) Rocío Ybarra

Source: FIH
