= 2002 Women's Hockey World Cup =

10th FIH Women's World Cup Perth 2002
- Official logo

Tournament details
- Host country: Australia
- City: Perth
- Dates: 24 November – 8 December
- Teams: 16
- Venue: Perth Hockey Stadium

Final positions
- Champions: Argentina (1st title)
- Runner-up: Netherlands
- Third place: China

Tournament statistics
- Matches played: 72
- Goals scored: 247 (3.43 per match)
- Top scorer: (South Africa) Pietie Coetzee (9 goals)
- Best player: (Argentina) Luciana Aymar

The 2002 Women's Hockey World Cup was the 10th edition of the Women's Hockey World Cup field hockey tournament. It was held from 24 November to 8 December 2002 in Perth, Western Australia.

Argentina won the tournament for the first time after defeating the Netherlands 4–3 in the final on penalty strokes after a 1–1 draw. China won the third place match by defeating defending champions Australia 2–0 to claim their first ever World Cup medal.

For this tournament, the participating nations were increased from the standard 12 (as in the 6 previous editions) to 16.

== Qualification ==
Each of the continental champions from five federations and the host nation received an automatic berth. The European federation received one extra quota based upon the FIH World Rankings. Spain and China qualified as 4th and 5th team in final ranking at the 2000 Summer Olympics, completing the final line-up alongside the six nations from the Qualifier.

After the United States could not attend the Qualifying Tournament due to the disruption of airline schedules after the September 11 attacks, the FIH organized a series of test-matches between that team and India (Seventh placed team in Qualifying Tournament) to ensure they had a chance to participate at the World Cup. The winner of the test-match series would qualify.

Dates	Event	Location	Qualifier(s)
Host nation			Australia
7–11 November 1998	1998 Hockey African Cup for Nations	Harare, Zimbabwe	South Africa
18–29 August 1999	1999 EuroHockey Nations Championship	Cologne, Germany	Netherlands; Germany
2–10 December 1999	1999 Hockey Asia Cup	New Delhi, India	South Korea
8–18 March 2001	2001 Pan American Cup	Kingston, Jamaica	Argentina
26–29 July 2001	2001 Oceania Cup	Wellington, Auckland, Hamilton, New Zealand	New Zealand^{1}
17–30 September 2001	Qualifier	Amiens, Abbeville, France	England; Russia; Ukraine; Japan; Ireland; Scotland
22–25 June 2002	Play-Off Competition	Cannock, England	United States
16–29 September 2000	2000 Summer Olympics	Sydney, Australia	Spain; China

^1–Australia qualified both as host and continental champion, therefore that quota was given to the Oceania federation allowing New Zealand to qualify directly to the World Cup as the second placed team at the 2001 Oceania Cup.

== Umpires ==
Below are the 18 umpires appointed by the International Hockey Federation:

- Chieko Akiyama (JPN)
- Michelle Arnold (AUS)
- Julie Ashton-Lucy (AUS)
- Judith Barnesby (AUS)
- Renée Cohen (NED)
- Ute Conen (GER)
- Carolina de la Fuente (ARG)
- Marelize de Klerk (RSA)
- Jean Duncan (SCO)
- Lynn Farrell (NZL)
- Sarah Garnett (NZL)
- Dawn Henning (ENG)
- Soledad Iparraguirre (ARG)
- Zang Jun Kentwell (USA)
- Lee Mi-ok (KOR)
- Mary Power (IRL)
- Gina Spitaleri (ITA)
- Kazuko Yasueda (JPN)

== Results ==
All times are Western Standard Time (UTC+08:00)

=== First round ===
==== Pool A ====
Pos	Team	Pld	W	D	L	GF	GA	GD	Pts	Qualification
1	Argentina	7	7	0	0	17	2	+15	21	Semi-finals
2	China	7	5	1	1	14	5	+9	16	Semi-finals
3	South Korea	7	4	2	1	20	7	+13	14	
4	Germany	7	4	0	3	17	10	+7	12	
5	New Zealand	7	2	0	5	8	12	−4	6	
6	Scotland	7	2	0	5	8	21	−13	6	
7	Ukraine	7	1	2	4	11	23	−12	5	
8	Russia	7	0	1	6	6	21	−15	1	

Source: FIH
Rules for classification: 1) points; 2) goal difference; 3) goals scored; 4) head-to-head result.

24 November 2002
14:05

China	0–0	South Korea
	Report

Umpires:
Marelize de Klerk (RSA)
Soledad Ipparraguirre (ARG)

24 November 2002
15:35

Russia	0–4	Germany
	Report	Bachmann 10'; Keller 40'; Rinne 56'; Ernsting-Krienke 62'

Umpires:
Judith Barnesby (AUS)
Mary Power (IRE)

24 November 2002
18:05

Argentina	1–0	New Zealand
García 46'	Report

Umpires:
Ute Conen (GER)
Julie Ashton-Lucy (AUS)

24 November 2002
20:05

Ukraine	2–1	Scotland
Kolomiyets 16'; Vasyukova 51'	Report	Carroll 21'

Umpires:
Jun Kentwell (USA)
Dawn Henning (ENG)

26 November 2002
14:05

New Zealand	3–1	Russia
Hamahona 22'; Pearce 45'; Christie 46'	Report	Chegurdaeva 54'

Umpires:
Marelize de Klerk (RSA)
Jun Kentwell (USA)

26 November 2002
16:05

Scotland	0–3	China
	Report	Tang 11', 59'; Zhou 17'

Umpires:
Lynn Farrell (NZL)
Carolina de la Fuente (ARG)

26 November 2002
18:05

Germany	1–3	South Korea
Rinne 64'	Report	Lee J. 21'; Lee S. 54'; Nam 62'

Umpires:
Julie Ashton-Lucy (AUS)
Chieko Akiyama (JPN)

26 November 2002
20:05

Argentina	5–1	Ukraine
García 21'; Aymar 23'; Margalot 37'; Rognoni 41'; Doreski 66'	Report	Vynohradova 46'

Umpires:
Lee Mi-Ok (KOR)
Jean Duncan (SCO)

28 November 2002
14:05

Scotland	2–1	New Zealand
Carroll 22'; Clement 39'	Report	Weavers 31'

Umpires:
Michelle Arnold (AUS)
Kazuko Yasueda (JPN)

28 November 2002
16:05

South Korea	2–2	Ukraine
Kim E. 35', 61'	Report	Vasyukova 8', 30'

Umpires:
Ute Conen (GER)
Jun Kentwell (USA)

28 November 2002
18:05

Germany	0–1	Argentina
	Report	Margalot 65'

Umpires:
Reneé Cohen (NED)
Sarah Garnet (GER)

28 November 2002
20:05

Russia	1–2	China
Rastorgoueva 56'	Report	Li S. 27'; Chen Z. 70'

Umpires:
Jean Duncan (SCO)
Chieko Akiyama (JPN)

29 November 2002
16:05

Germany	3–0	Scotland
Boie 16'; Lätzsch 19'; Ernsting-Krienke 20'	Report

Umpires:
Dawn Henning (ENG)
Jun Kentwell (USA)

29 November 2002
18:05

New Zealand	0–3	South Korea
	Report	Lee E. 3'; Kim Y. 15'; Nam 36'

Umpires:
Judith Barnesby (AUS)
Chieko Akiyama (JPN)

30 November 2002
10:35

Ukraine	3–3	Russia
Dudko 42'; Kobzenko 45', 58'	Report	Vassioukova 12'; Chegurdaeva 63'; Basaychuk 65'

Umpires:
Michelle Arnold (AUS)
Lyn Farrell (NZL)

30 November 2002
12:30

China	0–2	Argentina
	Report	García 5', 10'

Umpires:
Reneé Cohen (NED)
Julie Ashton-Lucy (AUS)

1 December 2002
09:05

Germany	3–1	New Zealand
Klecker 13', 67'; Böhmert 31'	Report	Turner 4'

Umpires:
Marelize de Klerk (RSA)
Jean Duncan (SCO)

1 December 2002
14:05

Argentina	5–0	Scotland
Burkart 6'; González Oliva 10'; Aymar 17'; García 41'; Arrondo 65'	Report

Umpires:
Jun Kentwell (USA)
Judith Barnesby (AUS)

1 December 2002
16:05

South Korea	5–0	Russia
Kim S. 38', 40'; Kim Y. 63', 69'; Lee S. 64'	Report

Umpires:
Mary Power (IRE)
Gina Spitaleri (ITA)

1 December 2002
18:05

China	4–1	Ukraine
Zhou 15'; Chen Z. 25', 56'; Fu 51'	Report	Savenko 68'

Umpires:
Lee Mi-Ok (KOR)
Chieko Akiyama (JPN)

3 December 2002
09:05

New Zealand	3–0	Ukraine
Roberts-Lang 32', 50', 64'	Report

Umpires:
Mary Power (IRE)
Soledad Iparraguirre (ARG)

3 December 2002
11:05

Germany	1–3	China
Ernsting-Krienke 44'	Report	Tang 26'; Fu 48'; Cheng 70'

Umpires:
Judith Barnesby (AUS)
Gina Spitaleri (ITA)

3 December 2002
14:05

Argentina	2–1	South Korea
García 17'; Stepnik 50'	Report	Lee S. 24'

Umpires:
Dawn Henning (ENG)
Chieko Akiyama (JPN)

3 December 2002
16:05

Scotland	3–1	Russia
Carroll 44'; Simpson 51', 64'	Report	Chegurdaeva 13'

Umpires:
Lee Mi-Ok (KOR)
Sarah Garnett (NZL)

4 December 2002
09:35

Ukraine	2–5	Germany
Vasyukova 39', 66'	Report	Rinne 24'; Ernsting-Krienke 27'; Böhmert 52'; Klecker 63', 69'

Umpires:
Carolina de la Fuente (ARG)
Lyn Farrell (NZL)

4 December 2002
15:35

South Korea	6–2	Scotland
Kim E. 6', 13'; Nam 22', 49'; Kim S. 40'; Oh 58'	Report	Lampard 17'; Simpson 68'

Umpires:
Reneé Cohen (NED)
Judith Barnesby (AUS)

4 December 2002
16:05

Russia	0–1	Argentina
	Report	García 54'

Umpires:
Dawn Henning (ENG)
Jean Duncan (SCO)

4 December 2002
20:05

China	2–0	New Zealand
Fu 14'; Cheng 31'	Report

Umpires:
Chieko Akiyama (JPN)
Gina Spitaleri (ITA)

==== Pool B ====
Pos	Team	Pld	W	D	L	GF	GA	GD	Pts	Qualification
1	Netherlands	7	6	1	0	22	5	+17	19	Semi-finals
2	Australia (H)	7	5	1	1	17	6	+11	16	Semi-finals
3	England	7	3	2	2	12	9	+3	11	
4	Spain	7	3	2	2	11	9	+2	11	
5	Japan	7	2	4	1	7	7	0	10	
6	United States	7	2	0	5	9	17	−8	6	
7	South Africa	7	1	2	4	10	17	−7	5	
8	Ireland	7	0	0	7	4	22	−18	0	

Source: FIH
Rules for classification: 1) points; 2) goal difference; 3) goals scored; 4) head-to-head result.
(H) Hosts

24 November 2002
09:05

Japan	1–1	Spain
Chiba 46'	Report	Romagosa 43'

Umpires:
Reneé Cohen (NED)
Lyn Farrell (NZL)

24 November 2002
09:35

England	3–1	Ireland
Grant 9'; Danson 15'; King 56'	Report	Boyles 40'

Umpires:
Michelle Arnold (AUS)
Carolina de la Fuente (ARG)

24 November 2002
11:05

Australia	4–0	United States
Hudson 3'; Powell 9'; Alcorn 17'; K. Smith 26'	Report

Umpires:
Chieko Akiyama (JPN)
Sarah Garnett (NZL)

24 November 2002
16:05

Netherlands	3–0	South Africa
Van der Vaart 32'; Schopman 37'; Donners 54'	Report

Umpires:
Gina Spitaleri (ITA)
Kazuko Yasueda (JPN)

25 November 2002
14:05

Japan	0–2	Netherlands
	Report	Donners 7'; Boomgaardt 46'

Umpires:
Lee Mi-Ok (KOR)
Judith Barnesby (AUS)

25 November 2002
16:05

South Africa	2–2	England
Koornhof 3'; Coetzee 54'	Report	Grant 2'; Clewlow 66'

Umpires:
Sarah Garnett (AUS)
Reneé Cohen (NED)

25 November 2002
18:05

United States	2–1	Ireland
Barber 14', 43'	Report	Boyles 24'

Umpires:
Jean Duncan (SCO)
Kazuko Yasueda (JPN)

25 November 2002
20:05

Spain	0–1	Australia
	Report	Powell 61'

Umpires:
Ute Conen (GER)
Gina Spitaleri (ITA)

27 November 2002
14:05

Spain	3–1	South Africa
Romagosa 5'; Huertas 29'; Camón 55'	Report	Coetzee 57'

Umpires:
Judith Barnesby (AUS)
Dawn Henning (ENG)

27 November 2002
16:05

United States	1–2	Japan
McCann 14'	Report	Chiba 26', 51'

Umpires:
Michelle Arnold (AUS)
Mary Power (IRE)

27 November 2002
18:05

Australia	2–1	Ireland
K. Smith 10'; Powell 14'	Report	Burke 25'

Umpires:
Marelize de Klerk (RSA)
Lee Mi-Ok (KOR)

27 November 2002
20:05

Netherlands	2–1	England
Petri 27'; Boomgaardt 58'	Report	King 21'

Umpires:
Soledad Iparraguirre (ARG)
Gina Spitaleri (ITA)

29 November 2002
09:05

South Africa	1–1	Japan
Coetzee 9'	Report	Saito 14'

Umpires:
Carolina de la Fuente (ARG)
Gina Spitaleri (ITA)

29 November 2002
11:05

Spain	4–1	United States
Goikoetxea 40'; Cámón 47'; Muñoz 50'; López 53'	Report	Barber 52'

Umpires:
Julie Ashton-Lucy (AUS)
Soledad Iparraguirre (ARG)

29 November 2002
14:05

Ireland	0–6	Netherlands
	Report	Donners 13'; Van Geenhuizen 36'; Moreira de Melo 41'; Van der Vaart 43'; Van Hees 45'; Boomgaardt 47'

Umpires:
Jean Duncan (SCO)
Kazuko Yasueda (JPN)

29 November 2002
20:05

England	1–3	Australia
King 24'	Report	Dobson 23'; Powell 30', 62'

Umpires:
Lyn Farrell (NZL)
Marelize de Klerk (RSA)

30 November 2002
14:35

United States	3–0	South Africa
McCann 26'; Jelley 37'; K. Smith 49'	Report

Umpires:
Dawn Henning (ENG)
Kazuko Yasueda (JPN)

30 November 2002
16:35

Ireland	1–2	Spain
Boyles 36'	Report	López 14'; Muñoz 61'

Umpires:
Carolina de la Fuente (ARG)
Sarah Garnett (NZL)

30 November 2002
18:35

Japan	1–1	England
Iwao 33'	Report	Walsh 59'

Umpires:
Soledad Iparraguirre (ARG)
Ute Conen (GER)

1 December 2002
11:05

Australia	1–3	Netherlands
K. Smith 43'	Report	Donners 5'; Van Geenhuizen 24'; Smabers 52'

Umpires:
Sarah Garnett (NZL)
Soledad Iparraguirre (ARG)

2 December 2002
14:05

United States	0–1	England
	Report	Wright 54'

Umpires:
Carolina de la Fuente (ARG)
Kazuko Yasueda (JPN)

2 December 2002
16:05

Japan	1–0	Ireland
Miura 66'	Report

Umpires:
Julie Ashton-Lucy (AUS)
Michelle Arnold (AUS)

2 December 2002
18:05

Spain	1–1	Netherlands
Camón 70'	Report	Schopman 54'

Umpires:
Dawn Henning (ENG)
Lyn Farrell (NZL)

2 December 2002
20:05

Australia	5–0	South Africa
Towers 1'; Skirving 10'; Hudson 26'; Netzler 42'; Twitt 51'	Report

Umpires:
Reneé Cohen (NED)
Ute Conen (GER)

4 December 2002
09:05

Netherlands	5–2	United States
Verbakel 12'; Donners 42'; Boomgaardt 56'; Van Hees 67', 68'	Report	Lucas 37'; Fuchs 70'

Umpires:
Kazuko Yasueda (JPN)
Ute Conen (GER)

4 December 2002
11:05

England	3–0	Spain
Grant 5'; J. Smith 54'; Bennett 70'	Report

Umpires:
Sarah Garnett (NZL)
Marelize de Klerk (RSA)

4 December 2002
14:05

Ireland	0–6	South Africa
	Report	Coetzee 4', 37', 54'; Wilson 8', 60'; Mayer 56'

Umpires:
Jun Kentwell (USA)
Julie Ashton-Lucy (AUS)

4 December 2002
18:05

Australia	1–1	Japan
Dobson 12'	Report	Yamamoto 19'

Umpires:
Lee Mi-Ok (KOR)
Mary Power (IRE)

=== Thirteenth to sixteenth classification ===
Crossover
6 December 2002
South Africa	4
Russia	1
6 December 2002
Ukraine	4
Ireland	3

Thirteenth Place
7 December 2002
South Africa	3
Ukraine	1
Fifteenth Place
7 December 2002
Russia	0
Ireland	1

==== Crossover ====
6 December 2002
09:05

South Africa	4–1	Russia
Coetzee 1'; Bee 13'; Carlisle 37'; Koornhof 48'	Report	Basaychuk 38'

Umpires:
Mary Power (IRE)
Michelle Arnold (AUS)

6 December 2002
09:35

Ukraine	4–3	Ireland
Kobzenko 18'; Savenko 30'; Kolomiyets 42'; Vasyukova 44'	Report	Boyles 14', 25'; Burke 26'

Umpires:
Dawn Henning (ENG)
Jean Duncan (SCO)

==== Fifteenth and sixteenth place ====
7 December 2002
09:05

Russia	0–1	Ireland
	Report	Burke 66'

Umpires:
Lee Mi-Ok (KOR)
Kazuko Yasueda (JPN)

==== Thirteenth and fourteenth place ====
7 December 2002
09:35

South Africa	3–1	Ukraine
Coetzee 11', 56'; Wehmeyer 60'	Report	Vasyukova 2'

Umpires:
Jun Kentwell (USA)
Mary Power (IRE)

=== Ninth to twelfth place classification ===
Crossover
6 December 2002
Japan	3
Scotland	0
6 December 2002
New Zealand	0
United States (a.e.t.)	1

Ninth Place
7 December 2002
Japan	0 (2)
United States (pen.)	0 (4)
Eleventh Place
7 December 2002
Scotland	0
New Zealand	3

==== Crossover ====
6 December 2002
12:05

Japan	3–0	Scotland
Chiba 30'; Yamamoto 56'; Komori 62'	Report

Umpires:
Ute Conen (GER)
Carolina de la Fuente (ARG)

6 December 2002
12:35

New Zealand	0–1 (a.e.t.)	United States
	Report	K. Smith 74'

Umpires:
Gina Spitaleri (ITA)
Kazuko Yasueda (JPN)

==== Eleventh and twelfth place ====
7 December 2002
12:05

Scotland	0–3	New Zealand
	Report	Weavers 23'; Christie 44'; Roberts-Lang 69'

Umpires:
Reneé Cohen (NED)
Soledad Iparraguirre (ARG)

==== Ninth and tenth place ====
7 December 2002
14:35

Japan	0–0 (a.e.t.)	United States
	Report
Penalties
Miura (penalty shoot-out missed); Iwao (penalty shoot-out missed); Morimoto (penalty shoot-out scored); Kimura (penalty shoot-out scored)	2–4	(penalty shoot-out scored) Tagliente; (penalty shoot-out scored) M. Smith; (penalty shoot-out scored) Everett; (penalty shoot-out scored) Fuchs

Umpires:
Ute Conen (GER)
Sarah Garnett (NZL)

=== Fifth to eighth place classification ===
Crossover
6 December 2002
England	7
Germany	2
6 December 2002
South Korea	2
Spain	0

Fifth Place
7 December 2002
England (pen.)	3 (4)
South Korea	3 (3)
Seventh Place
7 December 2002
Germany	6
Spain	1

==== Crossover ====
6 December 2002
15:05

England	7–2	Germany
Walker 2'; Wright 37'; Smith 39', 52', 58'; Bennett 43'; Marston-Smith 46'	Report	Lätzsch 11'; Ernsting-Krienke 17'

Umpires:
Marelize de Klerk (RSA)
Judith Barnesby (AUS)

6 December 2002
15:35

South Korea	2–0	Spain
Kim S. 23', 59'	Report

Umpires:
Chieko Akiyama (JPN)
Lyn Farrell (NZL)

==== Seventh and eighth place ====
7 December 2002
17:05

Germany	6–1	Spain
Ernsting-Krienke 3'; Rinne 11'; Böhmert 20'; Klecker 28'; Keller 49', 58'	Report	Goikoetxea 8'

Umpires:
Gina Spitaleri (ITA)
Jean Duncan (SCO)

==== Fifth and sixth place ====
7 December 2002
19:35

England	3–3 (a.e.t.)	South Korea
Grant 11', 63'; Smith 46'	Report	Lee S. 19', 45'; Kim E. 22'
Penalties
Walker (penalty shoot-out scored); Walsh (penalty shoot-out scored); Clewlow (penalty shoot-out missed); King (penalty shoot-out scored); Richardson (penalty shoot-out scored)	4–3	(penalty shoot-out missed) Kim E. (penalty shoot-out scored) Lee S. (penalty shoot-out scored) Lee J. (penalty shoot-out scored) Kim Y. (penalty shoot-out missed) Park

Umpires:
Judith Barnesby (AUS)
Carolina de la Fuente (ARG)

=== First to fourth place classification ===
Semi-finals
6 December 2002
Argentina	1
Australia	0
6 December 2002
Netherlands	1
China	0

Final
8 December 2002
Argentina (pen.)	1 (4)
Netherlands	1 (3)
Third Place
8 December 2002
Australia	0
China	2

==== Semi-finals ====
6 December 2002
18:05

Argentina	1–0	Australia
García 8'	Report

Umpires:
Reneé Cohen (NED)
Sarah Garnett (NZL)

6 December 2002
20:35

Netherlands	1–0	China
Van der Vaart 37'	Report

Umpires:
Soledad Iparraguirre (ARG)
Julie Ashton-Lucy (AUS)

==== Third and fourth place ====
8 December 2002
10:05

Australia	0–2	China
	Report	Ma 13'; Chen Z. 32'

Umpires:
Chieko Akiyama (JPN)
Lyn Farrell (NZL)

==== Final ====
8 December 2002
12:35

Argentina	1–1 (a.e.t.)	Netherlands
Arrondo 5'	Report 1 Report 2	Boomgaardt 69'
Penalties
Margalot (penalty shoot-out missed); Burkart (penalty shoot-out scored); Oneto (penalty shoot-out missed); Rognoni (penalty shoot-out missed); Aymar (penalty shoot-out missed) —— Margalot (penalty shoot-out scored); Burkart (penalty shoot-out scored); Rognoni (penalty shoot-out scored)	4–3	(penalty shoot-out missed) Boomgaardt; (penalty shoot-out missed) Donners; (penalty shoot-out missed) Smabers; (penalty shoot-out missed) de Bruijn; (penalty shoot-out scored) Moreira de Melo —— (penalty shoot-out scored) Boomgaardt; (penalty shoot-out scored) Donners; (penalty shoot-out missed) Moreira de Melo

Umpires:
Marelize de Klerk (RSA)
Julie Ashton-Lucy (AUS)

Team details

Argentina
Netherlands

GK	1	Mariela Antoniska
DF	14	Mercedes Margalot
DF	3	Magdalena Aicega
DF	6	Ayelén Stepnik
DF	16	Cecilia Rognoni	57'
MF	12	Mariana González Oliva
DF	24	Claudia Burkart
MF	8	Luciana Aymar
FW	2	Soledad García
FW	21	Inés Arrondo
FW	11	Karina Masotta (c)
Substitutions:
MF	4	María Paz Ferrari		(substituted on) 29'
FW	9	Vanina Oneto		(substituted on) 9'
FW	15	María P. Hernández		(substituted on) 7'
	23	Natali Doreski	50'	(substituted on) 11'
Coach:
(Argentina) Sergio Vigil

GK	1	Clarinda Sinnige
DF	6	Maartje Scheepstra
DF	11	Ageeth Boomgaardt
DF	15	Janneke Schopman
FW	18	Minke Booij
MF	3	Macha van der Vaart
MF	4	Fatima Moreira
MF	13	Minke Smeets
MF	14	Ellis Verbakel
FW	7	Miek van Geenhuizen
FW	10	Mijntje Donners
Substitutions:
FW	8	Karlijn Petri	(substituted on) 19'
DF	16	Chantal de Bruijn	(substituted on) 45'
FW	21	Lieve van Kessel	(substituted on) 26'
MF	24	Femke Kooijman	(substituted on) 12'
Coach:
(Netherlands) Marc Lammers

== Awards ==
Player of the Tournament	Top Goalscorer	Fair Play Trophy
(Argentina) Luciana Aymar	(South Africa) Pietie Coetzee	Argentina

== Statistics ==
=== Final standings ===
As per statistical convention in field hockey, matches decided in extra time are counted as wins and losses, while matches decided by penalty shoot-outs are counted as draws.

Pos	Grp	Team	Pld	W	D	L	GF	GA	GD	Pts	Final result
1st place, gold medalist(s)	A	Argentina	9	8	1	0	19	3	+16	25	Gold Medal
2nd place, silver medalist(s)	B	Netherlands	9	7	2	0	24	6	+18	23	Silver Medal
3rd place, bronze medalist(s)	A	China	9	6	1	2	16	6	+10	19	Bronze Medal
4	B	Australia (H)	9	5	1	3	17	9	+8	16	Fourth place
5	B	England	9	4	3	2	22	14	+8	15	Eliminated in group stage
6	A	South Korea	9	5	3	1	25	10	+15	18	Eliminated in group stage
7	A	Germany	9	5	0	4	25	18	+7	15	Eliminated in group stage
8	B	Spain	9	3	2	4	12	17	−5	11	Eliminated in group stage
9	B	United States	9	3	1	5	10	17	−7	10	Eliminated in group stage
10	B	Japan	9	3	5	1	10	7	+3	14	Eliminated in group stage
11	A	New Zealand	9	3	0	6	11	13	−2	9	Eliminated in group stage
12	A	Scotland	9	2	0	7	8	27	−19	6	Eliminated in group stage
13	B	South Africa	9	3	2	4	17	19	−2	11	Eliminated in group stage
14	A	Ukraine	9	2	2	5	16	29	−13	8	Eliminated in group stage
15	B	Ireland	9	1	0	8	8	26	−18	3	Eliminated in group stage
16	A	Russia	9	0	1	8	7	26	−19	1	Eliminated in group stage

Source: FIH
(H) Hosts

=== Goalscorers ===
There were 247 goals scored in 72 matches, for an average of 3.43 goals per match.

9 goals

- (South Africa) Pietie Coetzee

8 goals

- (Argentina) Soledad García

7 goals

- (Ukraine) Natalya Vasyukova

6 goals

- (Germany) Nadine Ernsting-Krienke

5 goals

- (Australia) Katrina Powell
- (England) Helen Grant
- (England) Jane Smith
- (Germany) Denise Klecker
- (Ireland) Arlene Boyles
- (Netherlands) Ageeth Boomgaardt
- (Netherlands) Mijntje Donners
- (South Korea) Kim Eun-Jin
- (South Korea) Kim Seong-Eun
- (South Korea) Lee Seon-Ok

4 goals

- (China) Chen Zhaoxia
- (Germany) Fanny Rinne
- (Japan) Kaori Chiba
- (New Zealand) Niniwa Roberts-Lang
- (South Korea) Nam Jin-a

3 goals

- (Australia) Karen Smith
- (China) Fu Baorong
- (China) Tang Chunling
- (England) Leisa King
- (Germany) Anneke Böhmert
- (Germany) Natascha Keller
- (Ireland) Jennifer Burke
- (Netherlands) Aniek van Hees
- (Netherlands) Macha van der Vaart
- (Russia) Marina Chegurdaeva
- (Scotland) Louise Carroll
- (Scotland) Rhona Simpson
- (South Korea) Kim Yun-Mi
- (Spain) Núria Camón
- (Ukraine) Tetyana Kobzenko
- (United States) Katherine Barber

2 goals

- (Argentina) Inés Arrondo
- (Argentina) Luciana Aymar
- (Argentina) Mercedes Margalot
- (Australia) Louise Dobson
- (Australia) Nicole Hudson
- (China) Cheng Hui
- (China) Zhou Wanfeng
- (England) Anna Bennett
- (England) Lucilla Wright
- (Germany) Heike Lätzsch
- (Japan) Yukari Yamamoto
- (Netherlands) Miek van Geenhuizen
- (Netherlands) Janneke Schopman
- (New Zealand) Amanda Christie
- (New Zealand) Diana Weavers
- (Russia) Galina Basaychuk
- (South Africa) Johke Koornof
- (South Africa) Jennifer Wilson
- (Spain) Erdoitza Goikoetxea
- (Spain) Lucía López
- (Spain) Silvia Muñoz
- (Spain) María Romagosa
- (Ukraine) Svitlana Kolomiyets
- (Ukraine) Zhanna Savenko
- (United States) Kristen McCann
- (United States) Keli Smith

1 goal

- (Argentina) Claudia Burkart
- (Argentina) Natalí Doreski
- (Argentina) Mariana González Oliva
- (Argentina) Cecilia Rognoni
- (Argentina) Ayelén Stepnik
- (Australia) Wendy Alcorn
- (Australia) Bianca Netzler
- (Australia) Angela Skirving
- (Australia) Julie Towers
- (Australia) Melanie Twitt
- (China) Li Shuang
- (China) Ma Yibo
- (England) Melanie Clewlow
- (England) Alexandra Danson
- (England) Denise Marston-Smith
- (England) Rachel Walker
- (England) Kate Walsh
- (Germany) Tina Bachmann
- (Germany) Julia Boie
- (Japan) Sachimi Iwao
- (Japan) Tomomi Komori
- (Japan) Keiko Miura
- (Japan) Naoko Saito
- (Netherlands) Fatima Moreira de Melo
- (Netherlands) Karlijn Petri
- (Netherlands) Minke Smabers
- (Netherlands) Ellis Verbakel
- (New Zealand) Piki Hamahona
- (New Zealand) Suzanne Pearce
- (New Zealand) Michelle Turner
- (Russia) Exaterina Rastorgoueva
- (Russia) Tatiana Vassioukova
- (Scotland) Linda Clement
- (Scotland) Claire Lampard
- (South Africa) Kerry Bee
- (South Africa) Lindsey Carlisle
- (South Africa) Sophie Mayer
- (South Africa) Sharne Wehmeyer
- (South Korea) Lee Eun-Young
- (South Korea) Lee Jin-Hee
- (South Korea) Oh Ko-Woon
- (Spain) Raquel Huertas
- (Ukraine) Maryna Dudko
- (Ukraine) Maryna Vynohradova
- (United States) Tracey Fuchs
- (United States) Tara Jelley
- (United States) Antoinette Lucas

Source: FIH
