= 2004 Women's Four Nations Hockey Tournament (Córdoba) =

Four Nations
Tournament details
- Host country: Argentina
- City: Córdoba
- Teams: 4 (from 3 confederations)
- Venue: Club La Tablada

Final positions
- Champions: Netherlands
- Runner-up: Argentina
- Third place: South Korea

Tournament statistics
- Matches played: 8
- Goals scored: 32 (4 per match)
- Top scorer(s): (Argentina) Soledad García (Netherlands) Mijntje Donners (4 goals)

The 2004 Women's Four Nations Hockey Tournament was a women's field hockey tournament, consisting of a series of test matches. It was held in Córdoba, Argentina, from February 11 to 15, 2004, and featured four of the top nations in women's field hockey.

== Competition format ==
The tournament featured the national teams of Germany, the Netherlands, South Korea, and the hosts, Argentina, competing in a round-robin format, with each team playing each other once. Three points were awarded for a win, one for a draw, and none for a loss.

Country	December 2003 FIH Ranking	Best World Cup finish	Best Olympic Games finish
Argentina	1	Champions (2002)	Runners-Up (2000)
Germany	8	Champions (1976, 1981)	Runners-Up (1992)
Netherlands	3	Champions (1974, 1978, 1983, 1986, 1990)	Champions (1984)
South Korea	6	Third Place (1990)	Runners-Up (1988, 1996)

== Officials ==
The following umpires were appointed by the International Hockey Federation to officiate the tournament:

- Stella Bartlema (NED)
- Cristina Ferrario (ARG)
- Christiane Hippler (GER)
- Kim Myung-Ok (KOR)
- Gina Spitaleri (ITA)

== Results ==
All times are local (Argentina Standard Time).

=== Preliminary round ===
Pos	Team	Pld	W	D	L	GF	GA	GD	Pts	Qualification
1	Argentina (H)	3	3	0	0	10	2	+8	9	Advanced to Final
2	Netherlands	3	1	1	1	7	6	+1	4	Advanced to Final
3	South Korea	3	0	2	1	4	7	−3	2	
4	Germany	3	0	1	2	4	10	−6	1	

Source: CAH
Rules for classification: 1) points; 2) goal difference; 3) goals scored; 4) head-to-head result.
(H) Hosts

==== Fixtures ====
11 February 2004
18:30

South Korea	2–2	Netherlands
Kim M. 6'; Oh 18'	Report	Boomgaardt 34'; Booij 55'

Umpires:
Cristina Ferrario (ARG)
Christiane Hippler (GER)

11 February 2004
21:00

Argentina	4–1	Germany
Russo 11'; Aymar 30'; García 36', 59'	Report	Rinne 53'

Umpires:
Gina Spitaleri (ITA)
Stella Bartlema (NED)

12 February 2004
18:30

South Korea	2–2	Germany
Kim Y. 52'; Park Mi-J. 61'	Report	Hoyer 33'; Rinne 59'

Umpires:
Gina Spitaleri (ITA)
Cristina Ferrario (ARG)

12 February 2004
18:30

Netherlands	1–3	Argentina
Donners 57'	Report	García 38'; Gulla 62'; Arrondo 68'

Umpires:
Christiane Hippler (GER)
Kim Myung-Ok (KOR)

14 February 2004
18:30

Netherlands	4–1	Germany
Donners 26', 45', 59'; Karres 69'	Report	Ernsting-Krienke 42'

Umpires:
Kim Myung-Ok (KOR)
Gina Spitaleri (ITA)

14 February 2004
21:00

Argentina	3–0	South Korea
Russo 13'; Aymar 47'; García 51'	Report

Umpires:
Stella Bartlema (NED)
Christiane Hippler (GER)

=== Classification round ===
==== Third and fourth place ====
15 February 2004
18:30

South Korea	3–2	Germany
Kim S. 11'; Kim Y. 29', 58'	Report	Kollmar 46'; Kühn 53'

Umpires:
Stella Bartlema (NED)
Cristina Ferrario (ARG)

==== Final ====
15 February 2004
21:00

Argentina	0–2	Netherlands
	Report	Booij 44'; Hoog 63'

Umpires:
Gina Spitaleri (ITA)
Kim Myung-Ok (KOR)

== Statistics ==
=== Final standings ===
Pos	Team	Pld	W	D	L	GF	GA	GD	Pts	Status
1st place, gold medalist(s)	Netherlands	4	2	1	1	9	6	+3	7	Tournament Champion
2nd place, silver medalist(s)	Argentina (H)	4	3	0	1	10	4	+6	9	
3rd place, bronze medalist(s)	South Korea	4	1	2	1	7	9	−2	5	
4	Germany	4	0	1	3	6	13	−7	1	

Source: CAH
(H) Hosts

=== Goalscorers ===
There were 32 goals scored in 8 matches, for an average of 4 goals per match.

4 goals

- (Argentina) Soledad García
- (Netherlands) Mijntje Donners

3 goals

- (South Korea) Kim Yun-Mi

2 goals

- (Argentina) Luciana Aymar
- (Argentina) Mariné Russo
- (Germany) Fanny Rinne
- (Netherlands) Minke Booij

1 goal

- (Argentina) Inés Arrondo
- (Argentina) Alejandra Gulla
- (Germany) Nadine Ernsting-Krienke
- (Germany) Kerstin Hoyer
- (Germany) Alexandra Kollmar
- (Germany) Anke Kühn
- (Netherlands) Ageeth Boomgaardt
- (Netherlands) Ellen Hoog
- (Netherlands) Sylvia Karres
- (South Korea) Oh Ko-Woon
- (South Korea) Park Mi-Jun
- (South Korea) Kim Mi-Seon
- (South Korea) Kim Seong-Eun
