= Natalí Doreski =

Argentine field hockey player

Personal information
- Born: 19 January 1980 (age 46) Buenos Aires, Argentina

Sport
- Sport: Field hockey
- Position: Forward
National team
Years	Team	Caps	Goals
2000–2001	Argentina U–21	13	(9)
2001–2005	Argentina	73	(23)
Medal record
Women's field hockey
Representing Argentina
FIH World Cup
Gold medal – first place	2002 Perth	Team
Pan American Games
Gold medal – first place	2003 Santo Domingo	Team
FIH Champions Trophy
Bronze medal – third place	2004 Rosario	Team
Pan American Cup
Gold medal – first place	2001 Kingston	Team
Gold medal – first place	2004 Bridgetown	Team
FIH Junior World Cup
Silver medal – second place	2001 Buenos Aires	Team

Natalí Doreski (born 19 January 1980) is a former field hockey player from Argentina, who played as a forward.

== Career ==
=== Under–21 ===
In 2001, Natalí Doreski was a member of the Argentina U–21 at the FIH Junior World Cup in Buenos Aires. At the tournament, Argentina finished in second place, taking home a silver medal.

=== Las Leonas ===
Doreski made her debut for the Las Leonas in 2001.

Throughout her career, Doreski won numerous medals; most notably gold at the 2002 FIH World Cup and the 2003 Pan American Games.
