= Emma Higgins =

Emma Higgins may refer to:

- Emma Higgins (footballer) (born 1986), Northern Irish footballer
- Emma Higgins (filmmaker) (fl. 2010s–2020s), Canadian filmmaker
