= Angela Platt =

Women's hockey and football goalkeeper, sports administrator

Personal information
- Born: 29 May 1979 (age 47) Coleraine, Northern Ireland

Sport
- Sport: Field hockey
- Position: Goalkeeper
Youth career
- Years: Team
- 1990–1997: Dalriada School
Senior career
Years	Team	Caps	Goals
199x–2007	Ballymoney	-	-
1998	→ Maryland Terrapins	-	-
2011	Ballymoney	-	-
2016	Ulster Elks	-	-
National team
Years	Team	Caps	Goals
2000–2006	Ireland	75	-

Angela Platt (born 29 May 1979) is a former Ireland women's field hockey international goalkeeper. Between 2000 and 2006 she made 75 senior appearances for Ireland. She represented Ireland at the 2002 Women's Hockey World Cup. She is also a former Northern Ireland women's football international goalkeeper. Between 2010 and 2017 she served as executive manager of the Ulster Hockey Union. In 2017 she was appointed general manager of the Northern Cricket Union.

== Early years, family and education ==
Platt is from Coleraine, Northern Ireland. Between 1990 and 1997 she attended Dalriada School. Between 1997 and 2001 she attended Ulster University where she gained a BSc in Sport, Exercise and Leisure. In 1998 she studied at the University of Maryland. Platt is the niece of Jim Platt, the former Northern Ireland football international goalkeeper. Her brother, David, is also a former footballer.

== Field hockey ==
=== Domestic teams ===
==== Maryland Terrapins ====
In 1998, while attending the University of Maryland, Platt played for Maryland Terrapins. She helped the team win the 1998 Atlantic Coast Conference tournament. Platt was subsequently named in the All-ACC Tournament Team. She also helped the team reach the quarter-finals of the 1998 NCAA Division I Field Hockey Championship.

==== Ballymoney ====
Platt was a member of the Ballymoney team that won the 2000–01 Irish Senior Cup, defeating Pegasus in the final. She was also a member of the Ballymoney team that finished as runners up to Pegasus in the 2007–08 Irish Senior Cup. Her teammates at Ballymoney have included Bridget McKeever and Megan Frazer. In 2011 Platt briefly came out of retirement to play for Ballymoney in the Ulster Premier League.

==== Ulster Elks ====
In May 2016 Platt, at the age of 37, again came out of retirement, this time to play for Ulster Elks in the EuroHockey Club Champions Challenge I. At the time Platt was a goalkeeping coach for Ulster Elks but a shortage of goalkeepers, due to exams, saw her called upon. She subsequently helped the Elks win the tournament.

=== Ireland international ===
In February 2000 Platt made her senior debut for Ireland against the United States. She had previously represented Ireland at under-18 and under-21 levels. Between 2000 and 2006 she made 75 senior appearances for Ireland. She represented Ireland at the 2002 Women's Hockey World Cup.

Tournaments	Place
2000 Women's Field Hockey Olympic Qualifier	8th
2001 Women's Intercontinental Cup	5th
2002 Women's Hockey World Cup	15th
2003 Women's EuroHockey Nations Championship	6th
2004 Women's Field Hockey Olympic Qualifier	8th
2005 Women's EuroHockey Nations Championship	5th
2006 Women's Intercontinental Cup	8th
2007 Women's EuroHockey Nations Championship	6th

== Association football ==
Angela Platt
Personal information
- Position: Goalkeeper

Senior career*
Years	Team	Apps	(Gls)
20xx–2006	Ballymoney United		
2006–201x	Crusaders Newtownabbey Strikers		

International career
2006–2008	Northern Ireland	3/4	
- * Club domestic league appearances and goals

=== Domestic teams ===
==== Ballymoney United ====
While playing field hockey with Ballymoney, Platt and her teammates also played women's association football for Ballymoney United during the close season.

==== Crusaders Newtownabbey Strikers ====
In 2006 Platt began playing for Crusaders Newtownabbey Strikers. She subsequently helped Crusaders win Women's Premiership titles and the 2011 IFA Women's Challenge Cup. She also played for Crusaders in the 2010–11 and 2013–14 UEFA Women's Champions League.

=== Northern Ireland international ===
Between 2006 and 2008 Platt played for the Northern Ireland women's national football team. She represented Northern Ireland in their UEFA Women's Euro 2009 qualifying campaign. On 18 November 2006 she came on as substitute for Emma Higgins against Turkey and on 20 November she made a full appearance against Georgia.

== Sports administrator ==
Platt is a sports administrator. In 2003 she began working for Carrickfergus Borough Council as a sports development officer. Between 2003 and 2009 she served as a sports development officer for Castlereigh Borough Council. Between 2009 and 2017 she served as the executive manager of the Ulster Hockey Union. Since April 2017 she has served as general manager of the Northern Cricket Union. Since 2011 Platt has also served on the Northern Ireland Sports Forum. She has chaired the Female Sports Forum and has represented the forum on the Belfast Telegraph sports awards selection committee.

== Honours ==
=== Field hockey ===
Ulster Elks

- EuroHockey Club Champions Challenge I
  - Winners: 2016

Ballymoney

- Irish Senior Cup
  - Winners: 2000–01
  - Runners-up: 2004–05, 2007–08

=== Association football ===
Crusaders Newtownabbey Strikers

- Women's Premier League
  - Winners: 2009, 2010, 2012
  - Runners-up: 2006, 2007, 2008
- IFA Women's Challenge Cup
  - Winners: 2011
  - Runners-up: 2007, 2009, 2010, 2012, 2013, 2015
