= Kate Barber =

American field hockey player

Medal record
Women's field hockey
Representing the United States
Pan American Games
| Silver medal – second place | 1999 Winnipeg | Team |
| Silver medal – second place | 2003 Santo Domingo | Team |
| Silver medal – second place | 2007 Rio de Janeiro | Team |

Kate ("Tiki") Barber (born November 22, 1976, in West Chester, Pennsylvania) is a field hockey forward and midfield player from the United States, who made her international senior debut for the Women's National Team in 1998 by scoring two goals in a 3–3 draw with New Zealand. The former student of Unionville High School and the University of North Carolina at Chapel Hill was a member of the team, that won the silver medal at the 1999 Pan American Games in Winnipeg, Manitoba, Canada.

She was the captain of the American field hockey team which competed in the 2008 Summer Olympics. It was the first Olympics for which the United States had qualified since the 1996 Summer Olympics.

She was once interviewed on the NBC Today Show by American football player, Tiki Barber, where it was revealed that she received her nickname "Tiki" because of his nickname. They were contemporary athletes in the Atlantic Coast Conference. Since he was a headlining football player at the University of Virginia at the time of her success at the University of North Carolina, her teammates began calling her "Tiki" as well. The nickname persisted into her international career.

== International senior tournaments ==
- 1998 – World Cup, Utrecht, The Netherlands (8th)
- 1999 – Pan American Games, Winnipeg, Canada (2nd)
- 2000 – Olympic Qualifying Tournament, Milton Keynes, England (6th)
- 2001 – Pan American Cup, Kingston, Jamaica (2nd)
- 2002 – Champions Challenge, Johannesburg, South Africa (5th)
- 2002 – USA vs India WC Qualifying Series, Cannock, England (1st)
- 2002 – World Cup, Perth, Australia (9th)
- 2003 – Champions Challenge, Catania, Italy (5th)
- 2003 – Pan American Games, Santo Domingo, Dominican Republic (2nd)
- 2004 – Olympic Qualifying Tournament, Auckland, New Zealand (6th)
- 2004 – Pan American Cup, Bridgetown, Barbados (2nd)
- 2005 – Champions Challenge, Virginia Beach, United States (5th)
- 2006 – World Cup Qualifier, Rome, Italy (4th)
- 2006 – World Cup, Madrid, Spain (6th)
- 2007 – Pan American Games, Rio de Janeiro (2nd)
- 2008 – 2008 Summer Olympics, Beijing, China (8th)
