= Jill Orbinson =

Ireland women's hockey international

Personal information
- Born: 13 September 1978 (age 47) Banbridge, County Down; Northern Ireland

Sport
- Sport: Field hockey
- Position: Midfielder/Defender
Youth career
- Years: Team
- 199x–199x: Portadown College
Senior career
Years	Team	Caps	Goals
199x–2005	Portadown	-	-
2005–201x	Pegasus	-	-
National team
Years	Team	Caps	Goals
1998–2007	Ireland	139	-

Jill Orbinson (born 13 September 1978) is a former Ireland women's field hockey international. Between 1998 and 2007 she made 139 senior appearances for Ireland. She represented Ireland at the 2002 Women's Hockey World Cup. She also played senior club field hockey for Pegasus in the Women's Irish Hockey League.

== Domestic teams ==
=== Portadown ===
Orbinson was a Portadown player when she made her senior Ireland debut.

=== Pegasus ===
In 2006–07 Orbison was a member of the Pegasus team that won an Irish Senior Cup and All Ireland Club Championship double. In 2007–08 she was also a member of the Pegasus team that won both the Ulster Shield and the Irish Senior Cup. In the Shield final she scored the second goal in a 3–0 win against Ballymoney.

== Ireland international ==
Orbinson made her senior debut for Ireland against Scotland in 1998. In July 2002 she made her 50th senior appearance for Ireland against Poland in a qualifier for the 2003 Women's EuroHockey Nations Championship. She marked the occasion by scoring two goals in a 4–0 win. Between 1998 and 2007 she made 139 senior appearances for Ireland.

Tournaments	Place
2000 Women's Field Hockey Olympic Qualifier	8th
2001 Women's Intercontinental Cup	5th
2002 Women's Hockey World Cup	15th
2003 Women's EuroHockey Nations Championship	6th
2004 Women's Field Hockey Olympic Qualifier	8th
2005 Women's EuroHockey Nations Championship	5th
2006 Women's Intercontinental Cup	8th
2007 Women's EuroHockey Nations Championship	6th

== Employment ==
Orbinson has worked as a physiotherapist.

== Honours ==
Pegasus

- Women's Irish Hockey League
  - Winners: 2010–11
- Irish Senior Cup
  - Winners: 2006–07, 2007–08
  - Runners-up: 2009
- Ulster Shield
  - Winners: 2005–06, 2007–08, 2008–09
- All-Ireland Club Championship
  - Winners: 2007
  - Runners-up: 2006
