= Jane Burley =

Scottish field hockey player

Jane Burley (born 12 February 1971 in Liverpool) is a Scottish field hockey midfielder. She played club hockey for Giffnock Hutchesons Ladies, and made her debut for the Women's National Team in 1996. Burley works as a firefighter. Her mother played tennis for Lancashire.
