= Lee Jin-hee (field hockey) =

South Korean hockey player

Personal information
- Nationality: South Korean
- Born: 15 May 1980 (age 46)

Sport
- Sport: Field hockey
Medal record
Women's field hockey
Representing South Korea
Asian Games
Silver medal – second place	2002 Busan	Team

Lee Jin-hee (born 15 May 1980) is a South Korean former field hockey player. She competed in the women's tournament at the 2004 Summer Olympics.
