= Chantal de Bruijn =

Dutch field hockey player

Personal information
- Born: 13 February 1976 (age 50) Schoonhoven, the Netherlands
- Height: 174 cm (5 ft 9 in)
- Weight: 71 kg (157 lb)

Sport
- Sport: Field hockey
- Club: Sport Vereniging Kampong, Utrecht
Medal record
Representing the Netherlands
Olympic Games
Silver medal – second place	2004 Athens	Team competition
World Cup
Silver medal – second place	2002 Perth	Team competition
Gold medal – first place	2006 Madrid	Team competition
Champions Trophy
Silver medal – second place	2001 Amstelveen	Team competition
Bronze medal – third place	2002 Macau	Team competition
Bronze medal – third place	2003 Sydney	Team competition
Gold medal – first place	2004 Rosario	Team competition
Gold medal – first place	2005 Canberra	Team competition
Bronze medal – third place	2006 Amstelveen	Team competition

Chantal de Bruijn (born 13 February 1976) is a Dutch field hockey defender who has played for Dutch clubs Shinty, SV Kampong and Amsterdam. She made her debut for the Netherlands national team on 21 August 2001 against New Zealand. De Bruijn was a member of the Dutch squad that won the silver medal at the 2004 Summer Olympics in Athens. She was also part of the Dutch squad that became world champions at the 2006 Women's Hockey World Cup.
