= Femke Kooijman =

Dutch field hockey player

Personal information
- Born: 8 March 1978 (age 48)
Medal record
Women's field hockey
Representing the Netherlands
World Cup
Silver medal – second place	2002 Perth	Team Competition
Champions Trophy
Bronze medal – third place	2002 Macau	Team Competition
Bronze medal – third place	2003 Sydney	Team Competition

Femke Kooijman (pronounced [ˈfɛmkə ˈkoːimɑn]; born 8 March 1978) is a retired Dutch field hockey player, who played for the Dutch hockey team HC Klein Zwitserland and the Netherlands women's national field hockey team. She earned a total number of 42 caps from 2002 to 2004.
