= Jennifer Burke (field hockey) =

Irish field hockey player (born 1982)

Personal information
- Born: 23 April 1974 (age 52) Dublin, Ireland
- Height: 167 cm (5 ft 6 in)

Sport
- Sport: Field hockey
- Position: Forward
National team
Years	Team	Caps	Goals
1995–2005	Ireland	161	(55)

Jennifer Burke (born 23 April 1974) is a retired field hockey player from Ireland.

== Personal life ==
Burke was born in Dublin, Ireland.

== Career ==
She made her international debut for the Green Army in 1995. She earned her first senior cap during a test match against China.

During her career, she represented the squad at a number of major tournaments, including the 1999 EuroHockey Championship in Cologne, the 2000 FIH Olympic Qualifiers in Milton Keynes, the 2001 Intercontinental Cup in Amiens and Abbeville, and the 2002 FIH World Cup in Perth.

Following the FIH World Cup, Burke announced her retirement from international hockey. She was later convinced by national coach, Riet Kuper, to return to the national squad for the 2003 EuroHockey Championship in Barcelona. This sparked controversy, however, as Burke's return was conditional on the basis of leaving the tournament to attend a wedding, which resulted in her missing the team's 1–1 draw against Ukraine.

After her international return, she served as vice-captain of the squad until her retirement in 2005. During this period, she represented the side at the 2004 FIH Olympic Qualifiers in Auckland, before making her final international appearances at the 2005 EuroHockey Championships in her home town of Dublin.

At the time of her retirement, she was Ireland's second most capped international woman, with 161 appearances for the national team, as well as scoring over 50 goals.
