= Karlijn Petri =

Dutch field hockey player (born 1978)

Personal information
- Born: 5 November 1978 (age 47) Maassluis, Netherlands

Sport
- Sport: Field hockey
- Position: Forward
National team
| Years | Team | Caps | Goals |
| 1998–2002 | Netherlands | 42 | (8) |
Medal record
Women's field hockey
Representing Netherlands
FIH World Cup
| Silver medal – second place | 2002 Perth |
EuroHockey Championship
| Gold medal – first place | 1999 Cologne |
FIH Champions Trophy
| Silver medal – second place | 1999 Brisbane |
| Silver medal – second place | 2001 Amstelveen |

Karlijn Petri (born 5 November 1978) is a retired field hockey player from the Netherlands.

== Personal life ==
Petri was born and raised in Maassluis.

== Hockey ==
=== Club career ===
Throughout her club career, she represented VMHC Pollux, Rotterdam and HV Victoria.

=== Senior national team ===
Petri made her international debut for the Netherlands in 1998. She earned her first senior cap in a test match against Japan in The Hague, scoring two goals on debut.

Throughout her senior career, she represented the national team at four major tournaments, winning medals at each of them. She took home gold at the 1999 EuroHockey Championship in Cologne, and silver medals at the 1999 and 2001 editions of the FIH Champions Trophy in Brisbane and Amstelveen, as well as the 2002 FIH World Cup in Perth.

Following the 2002 FIH World Cup, she retired from international hockey.

== International goals ==
| Goal | Date | Location | Opponent | Score | Result | Competition | Ref. |
|---|---|---|---|---|---|---|---|
| 1 | 9 September 1998 | Haagsche Delftsche Mixed, The Hague, Netherlands | Japan | 2–0 | 9–0 | Test Match | |
| 2 | 9 September 1998 | Haagsche Delftsche Mixed, The Hague, Netherlands | Japan | 7–0 | 9–0 | Test Match | |
| 3 | 12 December 1998 | CeNARD, Buenos Aires, Argentina | Australia | 1–0 | 2–0 | Test Match | |
| 4 | 19 June 1999 | Queensland State Hockey Centre, Brisbane, Australia | Australia | 2–2 | 2–3 | 1999 FIH Champions Trophy | |
| 5 | 7 August 1999 | National Hockey Stadium, Milton Keynes, England | Spain | 2–0 | 3–1 | Test Match | |
| 6 | 19 August 1999 | Rot-Weiss Köln, Cologne, Germany | Belgium | 11–0 | 15–0 | 1999 EuroHockey Championship | |
| 7 | 2 February 2000 | Hartleyvale Stadium, Cape Town, South Africa | South Africa | 2–1 | 2–2 | Test Match | |
| 8 | 27 November 2002 | Perth Hockey Stadium, Perth, Australia | England | 1–1 | 2–1 | 2002 FIH World Cup | |
