= Amanda Hooper =

New Zealand field hockey player

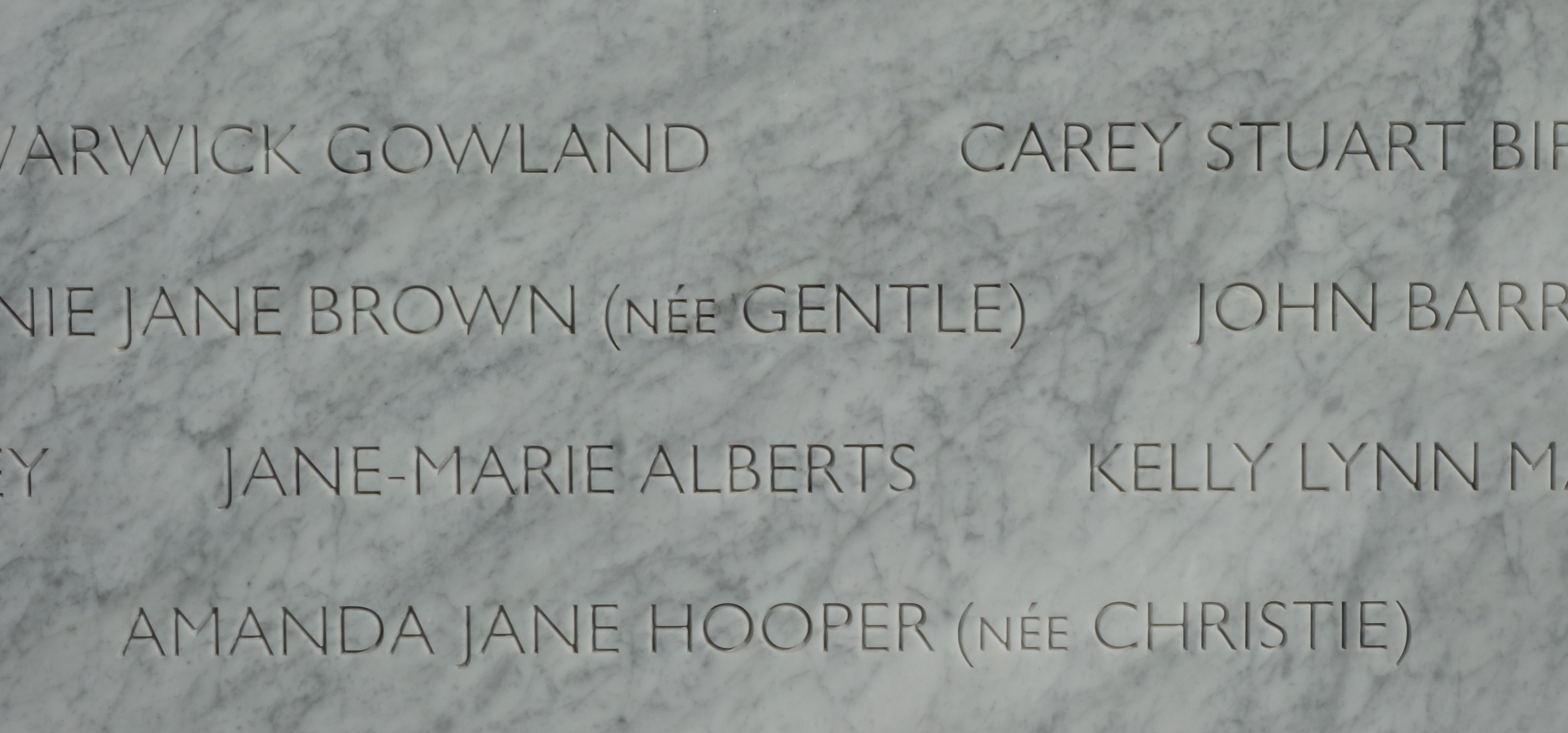
- The inscription for Hooper on the Canterbury Earthquake National Memorial

Personal information
- Born: 1980 Southland, New Zealand
- Died: 22 February 2011 (aged 30) Christchurch, New Zealand

Sport
- Sport: Field hockey
National team
Years	Team	Caps	Goals
2001–2003	New Zealand	40	-

Amanda Jane Hooper (née Christie; 1980 – 22 February 2011) was a professional field hockey player from New Zealand. She died in one of the office buildings that collapsed in the February 2011 Christchurch earthquake at age 30.

Amanda Christie was born in Southland in 1980 and grew up in Waikaia on her family's farm. She was head girl at Gore High School in 1998; her motivation for success stemmed from her father's death four years earlier. She was married to Richard Hooper and had two girls with him who at the time of her death were two and four years old.

She was a member of the national women's squad The Black Sticks from 2001 to 2003, with a total of 40 caps. In 2003, she was nominated for World Junior Player of the Year. She participated in the 2002 Commonwealth Games in Manchester, England, where the New Zealand women came fourth. She competed in the 2002 Women's Hockey World Cup where New Zealand came eleventh. Locally, she played 55 games for Canterbury, and was a member of Carlton Redcliffs.

Hooper lived in Rolleston and worked for Marac Finance as an account manager. Her company was based at the PGC Building in the Christchurch Central City that collapsed in the 2011 Christchurch earthquake. On 11 March 2011, Christchurch police confirmed that Hooper was one of the victims of the earthquake. Ian Rutledge, her coach for two years, described her as having a "warm and caring nature" and "one of the hardest-training athletes he had come across in his coaching career". Her former team, Carlton Redcliffs, awards the Amanda Hooper Award and has retired her number from their women's team in her memory.
