= Nami Miyazaki =

Japanese field hockey player

Nami Miyazaki 宮崎奈美
Medal record

Women's field hockey

Representing Japan

Asian Games
Bronze medal – third place	2002 Busan	Team

Champions Challenge
Bronze medal – third place	2003 Catania	Team

Nami Miyazaki (Japanese: 宮崎奈美; born April 13, 1976) is a field hockey international goalkeeper from Japan, who was a member of the national women's team that competed at the 2004 Summer Olympics in Athens, Greece.
