= Ayelén Stepnik =

Argentine field hockey player

Personal information
- Full name: Ayelén Iara Stepnik
- Born: November 22, 1975 (age 50) Rosario, Argentina
Medal record
Women's field hockey
Representing Argentina
Olympic Games
Silver medal – second place	2000 Sydney	Team
Bronze medal – third place	2004 Athens	Team
World Cup
Gold medal – first place	2002 Perth	Team
Champions Trophy
Gold medal – first place	2001 Amstelveen	Team
Silver medal – second place	2002 Macau	Team
Bronze medal – third place	2004 Rosario	Team
Pan American Games
Gold medal – first place	1999 Winnipeg	Team
Gold medal – first place	2003 Santo Domingo	Team

Ayelén Iara Stepnik (born November 22, 1975) is a retired field hockey player from Argentina who won the silver medal at the 2000 Summer Olympics in Sydney and the bronze medal at the 2004 Summer Olympics in Athens with the National field hockey team. Ayelén also won the 2002 World Cup, the 2001 Champions Trophy and two Pan American Games.
