= Lim Heung-sin =

South Korean field hockey coach (born 1967)

- Hangul: 임흥신
- Hanja: 林興信
- RR: Im Heungsin
- MR: Im Hŭngsin

Lim Heung-sin (born January 1, 1967) is a South Korean field hockey coach. At the 2012 Summer Olympics he coached the South Korea women's national field hockey team.
