= Maartje Scheepstra =

Dutch field hockey player

Medal record

Representing the Netherlands

Women's Field hockey

Olympic Games
Silver medal – second place	2004 Athens	Team

Maartje Scheepstra (born 1 April 1980) is a Dutch field hockey player. She was born in Papua, Indonesia, and grew up in Almere. She won a silver medal at the 2004 Summer Olympics in Athens.
