= Helen Grant (field hockey) =

English field hockey player

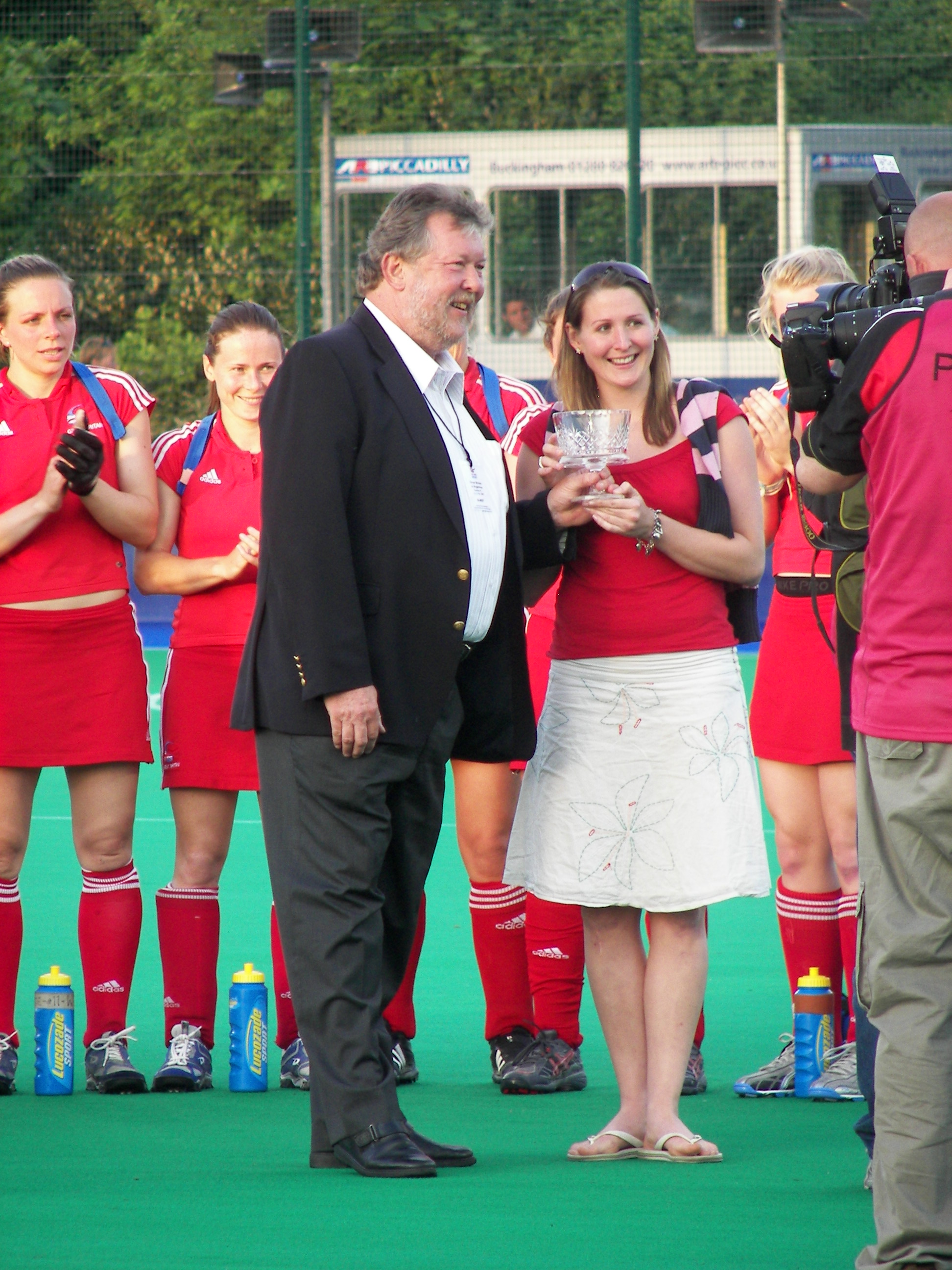
Grant being presented with an award to mark her retirement from hockey.

Helen Grant (born 14 February 1979 in Halifax, West Yorkshire) is an English women's field hockey forward, who has competed at both national and international level, representing both England and Great Britain during her career.

Grant made her debut for England against Ireland in Belfast, Northern Ireland on 16 June 2001 and went on to make 105 appearances, scoring a total of 30 goals before her final game against Germany at the World Cup in Madrid, Spain on 8 October 2006. Her first appearance for the British team was against South Africa in Potchefstroom on 17 May 2003, where she scored both goals in a match which was a 2–2 draw for the United Kingdom. Her last appearance for the UK was also against South Africa at Stellenbosch on 10 January 2007, although this time the team lost 3–1. By this time Grant had accumulated 11 caps and four goals for Great Britain. She has played in two World Cups (2002 and 2006) and two European Cups (2003 and 2005). Grant was England's top goalscorer at the 2002 Commonwealth Games in Manchester, the 2002 World Cup in Australia and the 2006 Commonwealth Games in Melbourne.

Nationally, Grant scored a total of 68 goals in the Women's England Hockey League, and spent two seasons at HC Rotterdam where she scored 18 goals and was crowned top goalscorer for the First XI in her second season.

In 2008, she announced her retirement from hockey due to an ongoing knee injury sustained in 1997.
