= Emma Higgins (footballer) =

Northern Irish footballer

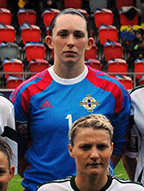
- Emma Higgins (in blue) in May 2014.

Personal information
- Full name: Emma Mary Higgins
- Date of birth: 15 May 1986 (age 40)
- Place of birth: Ballymena, Northern Ireland
- Height: 1.69 m (5 ft 6 1/2 in)
- Position: Goalkeeper

Team information
- Current team: Glentoran
- Number: 24

Senior career*
Years	Team	Apps	(Gls)
- Ballymena United Allstars
- Glentoran Belfast United
2007–2010	Leeds United		
2010–2011	Grindavík	26	(0)
2012	KR	7	(0)
2013	Doncaster Rovers Belles	0	(0)
2014–2017	Grindavík	48	(0)
2018	Selfoss	1	(0)
2019–	Glentoran		

International career^{‡}
2004–	Northern Ireland	87	(1)
- * Club domestic league appearances and goals ‡ National team caps and goals as of 14:50, 30 June 2012 (UTC)

Emma Mary Higgins (born 15 May 1986) is an association football goalkeeper from Northern Ireland, currently playing for Glentoran. She previously played for Icelandic clubs Grindavík, KR and Selfoss. In 2013 she was with Doncaster Rovers Belles of the FA WSL. Since her first appearance in 2004, Higgins has accrued over 85 caps for Northern Ireland.

== Club career ==
Born in Ballymena, Higgins played for her hometown club before joining Glentoran Belfast United. She had originally played outfield but when the Ballymena Allstars goalkeeper became pregnant, Higgins was selected as her replacement. The coach knew Higgins had a background in Gaelic football and reasoned she would be good at catching the ball. In 2007, she won a scholarship to Leeds Metropolitan University and signed for Leeds United, where she competed with Carly Telford for a place in the team.

She subsequently played for Grindavík and KR in the Icelandic Úrvalsdeild. She returned to Northern Ireland to play for Glentoran ahead of the 2019 Women's Premiership season.

== International career ==
Higgins made her senior Northern Ireland debut aged 17, against Portugal at the Algarve Cup in March 2004. Eight years later she made her 50th appearance against New Zealand at the 2012 Cyprus Cup. Higgins was named captain for the occasion and was Player of the Match in Northern Ireland's 2–0 defeat.

In June 2012, Higgins was named as one of four reserves to the 18-player Great Britain squad for the 2012 London Olympics.
