= Louise Carroll =

Scottish field hockey player

Louise Carroll (born 12 December 1982 in Dundee) is a female field hockey defender from Scotland. She plays club hockey for Bonagrass Grove Ladies, and made her debut for the Women's National Team in 2002. Carroll was the Scottish team's flag bearer at the 2000 Youth Commonwealth Games.
