= Miek van Geenhuizen =

Dutch field hockey player

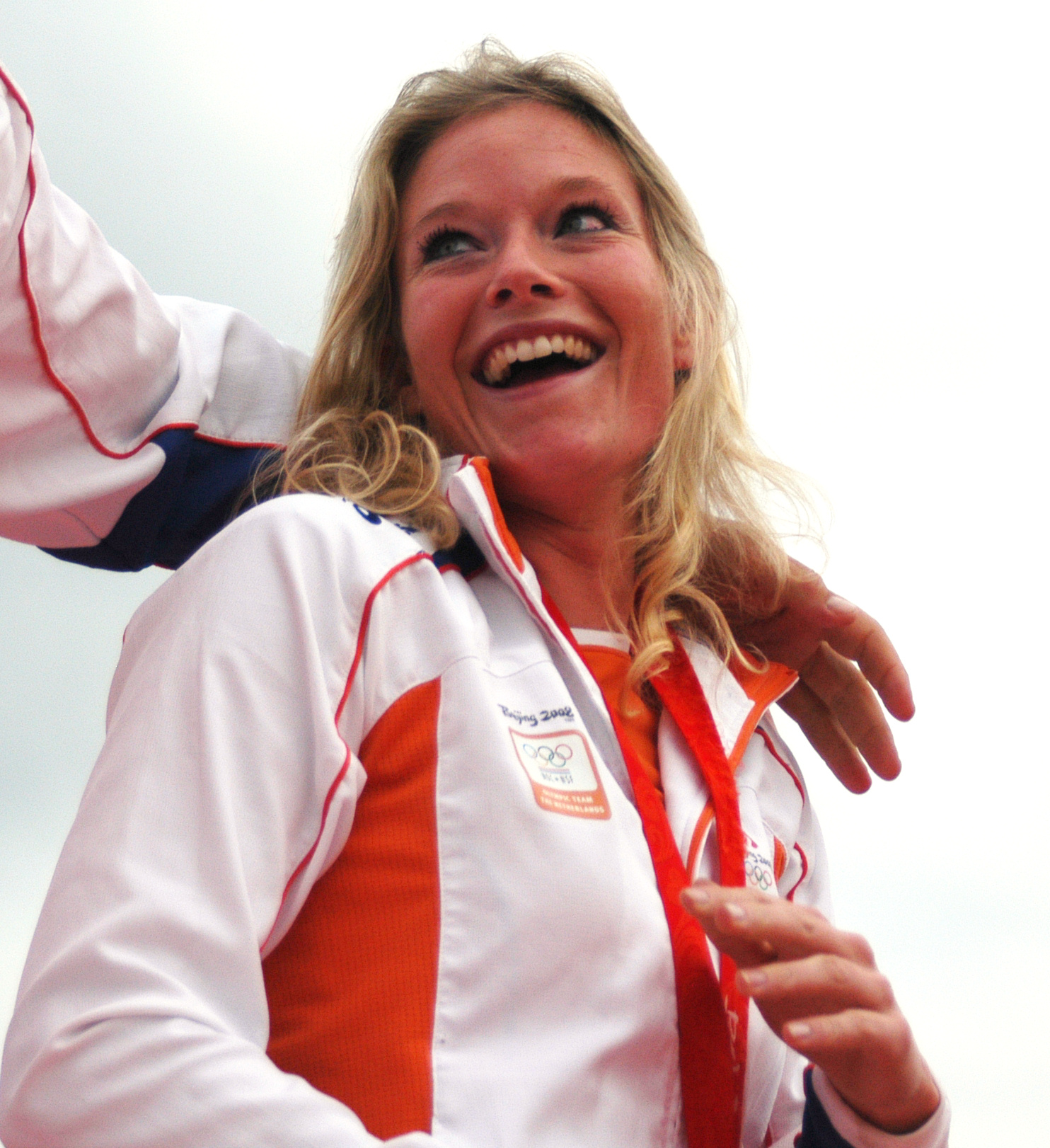

Medal record

Women's field hockey

Representing the Netherlands

Olympic Games
Gold medal – first place	2008 Beijing	Team competition
Silver medal – second place	2004 Athens	Team competition

World Cup
Gold medal – first place	2006 Madrid	Team competition
Silver medal – second place	2002 Perth	Team competition

European Championship
Silver medal – second place	2007 Manchester	Team competition

Champions Trophy
Gold medal – first place	2000 Amstelveen	Team competition
Gold medal – first place	2004 Rosario	Team competition
Gold medal – first place	2005 Canberra	Team competition
Silver medal – second place	2001 Amstelveen	Team competition
Bronze medal – third place	2002 Macau	Team competition
Bronze medal – third place	2003 Sydney	Team competition
Bronze medal – third place	2006 Amstelveen	Team competition

Marianne ("Miek") Antoinette van Geenhuizen (born 17 December 1981 in Eindhoven, North Brabant) is a Dutch field hockey player who played as an attacker for Dutch clubs Oranje Zwart, HC Den Bosch and Laren. Currently she is playing for Amsterdam.

Van Geenhuizen also plays for the Netherlands national team. She was a member of the Dutch squad that won the silver medal at the 2004 Summer Olympics in Athens. She was also part of the Dutch squad that became world champions at the 2006 Women's Hockey World Cup.

At the 2008 Summer Olympics in Beijing she won an olympic gold medal with the Dutch national team beating China in the final 2–0.
