= Lisa Walton =

New Zealand field hockey player

Personal information
- Full name: Lisa Mary Walton
- Born: 14 December 1975 (age 50) Christchurch, New Zealand
- Height: 1.68 m (5 ft 6 in)
- Weight: 65 kg (143 lb)
Medal record
Women's field hockey
Representing New Zealand
Commonwealth Games
Bronze medal – third place	1998 Kuala Lumpur	Team

Lisa Mary Walton (born 14 December 1975) is a former New Zealand field hockey player. She won the bronze medal with the women's national team at the 1998 Commonwealth Games, and also competed for New Zealand at the 2004 Summer Olympics in Athens, finishing in sixth place.

Walton was born in Christchurch on 14 December 1975, the daughter of Kate Walton (née Buchanan) and David Walton, and educated at Rangi Ruru Girls' School from 1989 to 1993. She went on to study at the University of Canterbury between 1994 and 1997, graduating with a Bachelor of Science degree and a postgraduate diploma in marketing and management. While at Canterbury, she was awarded a New Zealand university blue for hockey in 1996 and 1997. Walton lives in Singapore with her British wife.
