= Macha van der Vaart =

Dutch field hockey player

Personal information
- Born: 17 April 1972 (age 54)
Medal record
Women's field hockey
Representing the Netherlands
Olympic Games
Silver medal – second place	2004 Athens	Team
Bronze medal – third place	2000 Sydney	Team
World Cup
Silver medal – second place	2002 Perth	Team
Champions Trophy
Gold medal – first place	2000 Amstelveen	Team
Silver medal – second place	1999 Brisbane	Team
Silver medal – second place	2001 Amstelveen	Team
Bronze medal – third place	2002 Macau	Team
Bronze medal – third place	2003 Sydney	Team
European Championship
Gold medal – first place	1999 Cologne	Team

Macha Alexandra van der Vaart (born 17 April 1972 in Alkmaar, North Holland) is a former field hockey midfielder from the Netherlands, who played 151 international matches for the Dutch National Women's Team, in which she scored seventeen goals. She made her debut on 9 December 1998 against Australia (1-1), and was a member of the team that won bronze at the 2000 Summer Olympics and silver at the 2004 Summer Olympics. She retired from international competition after the Athens Games.
