= Niniwa Roberts =

New Zealand field hockey player

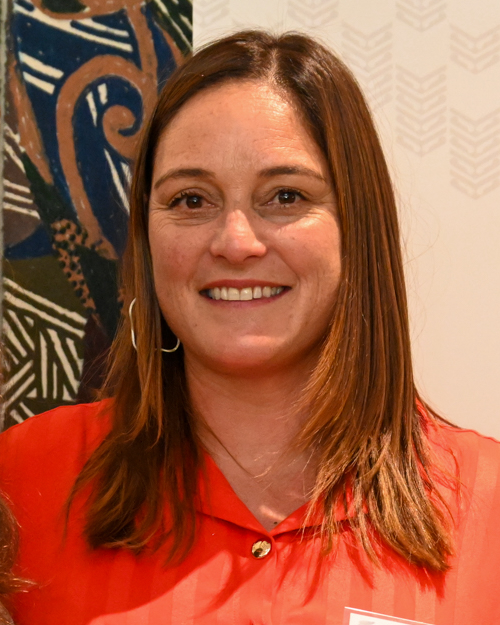
- Roberts in 2024

Personal information
- Born: Niniwa Kiri Rata Roberts; 1 June 1976 (age 50) Takapuna, New Zealand

Sport
- Sport: Field hockey
- Position: Forward
Senior career
Years	Team	Caps	Goals
1998-2009	Capital	-	-
National team
Years	Team	Caps	Goals
2001–2008	New Zealand	141	(47)
Medal record
Women's field hockey
Representing New Zealand
Champions Challenge
Gold medal – first place	2005 Virginia Beach	Team
- Updated on 16 August 2012 (national)

Niniwa Kiri Rata Roberts (born 1 June 1976) is a New Zealand field hockey player. She competed for the New Zealand women's national field hockey team (the Black Sticks Women) between 2001 and 2008, including for the team at the 2004 and 2008 Summer Olympics.

Niniwa has a younger sister, Aniwaka, who was selected for the Black Sticks Women in November 2012.

== International senior competitions ==
- 2001 – Champions Trophy, Amstelveen
- 2002 – Commonwealth Games, Manchester
- 2002 – Champions Trophy, Macau
- 2002 – World Cup, Perth
- 2003 – Champions Challenge, Catania
- 2004 – Olympic Qualifying Tournament, Auckland
- 2004 – Summer Olympics, Athens
- 2004 – Champions Trophy, Rosario
- 2005 – Champions Challenge, Virginia Beach
- 2006 – World Cup Qualifier, Rome
- 2008 – Summer Olympics, Beijing
