= Mariana González Oliva =

Argentine field hockey player

Personal information
- Born: March 12, 1976 (age 50) Buenos Aires, Argentina
Medal record
Women's field hockey
Representing Argentina
Olympic Games
Bronze medal – third place	2004 Athens	Team
Bronze medal – third place	2008 Beijing	Team
World Cup
Gold medal – first place	2002 Perth	Team
Bronze medal – third place	2006 Madrid	Team
Pan American Games
Gold medal – first place	2003 Santo Domingo	Team
Gold medal – first place	2007 Rio de Janeiro	Team
Champions Trophy
Gold medal – first place	2001 Amstelveen	Team
Gold medal – first place	2008 Mönchengladbach	Team
Silver medal – second place	2002 Macau	Team
Silver medal – second place	2007 Quilmes	Team
Bronze medal – third place	2004 Rosario	Team
Pan American Cup
Gold medal – first place	2001 Kingston	Team

Mariana Alejandra González Oliva Gulla (born March 12, 1976, in Buenos Aires) is an Argentine retired field hockey player, who twice won a bronze medal with the national women's hockey team at the Summer Olympics in 2004 and 2008, the World Cup in 2002, two Champions Trophy (2001) and (2008), two Pan American Games (2003) and (2007) and the Pan American Cup in 2001.
