= María del Mar Feito =

Spanish field hockey player (born 1975)

Personal information
- Born: 10 September 1975 (age 50)
Medal record
Women's field hockey
Representing Spain
Champions Challenge
Silver medal – second place	2003 Catania	Team competition
European Nations Cup
Silver medal – second place	1995 Amstelveen	Team Competition

María del Mar Feito Acebo (born 10 September 1975 in Madrid) is a former field hockey forward from Spain, who represented her native country at three consecutive Summer Olympics, starting in 1996 (Atlanta, Georgia). She played club hockey at a club named San Pablo Valdeluz.
