= Jane Smith (field hockey) =

British field hockey player

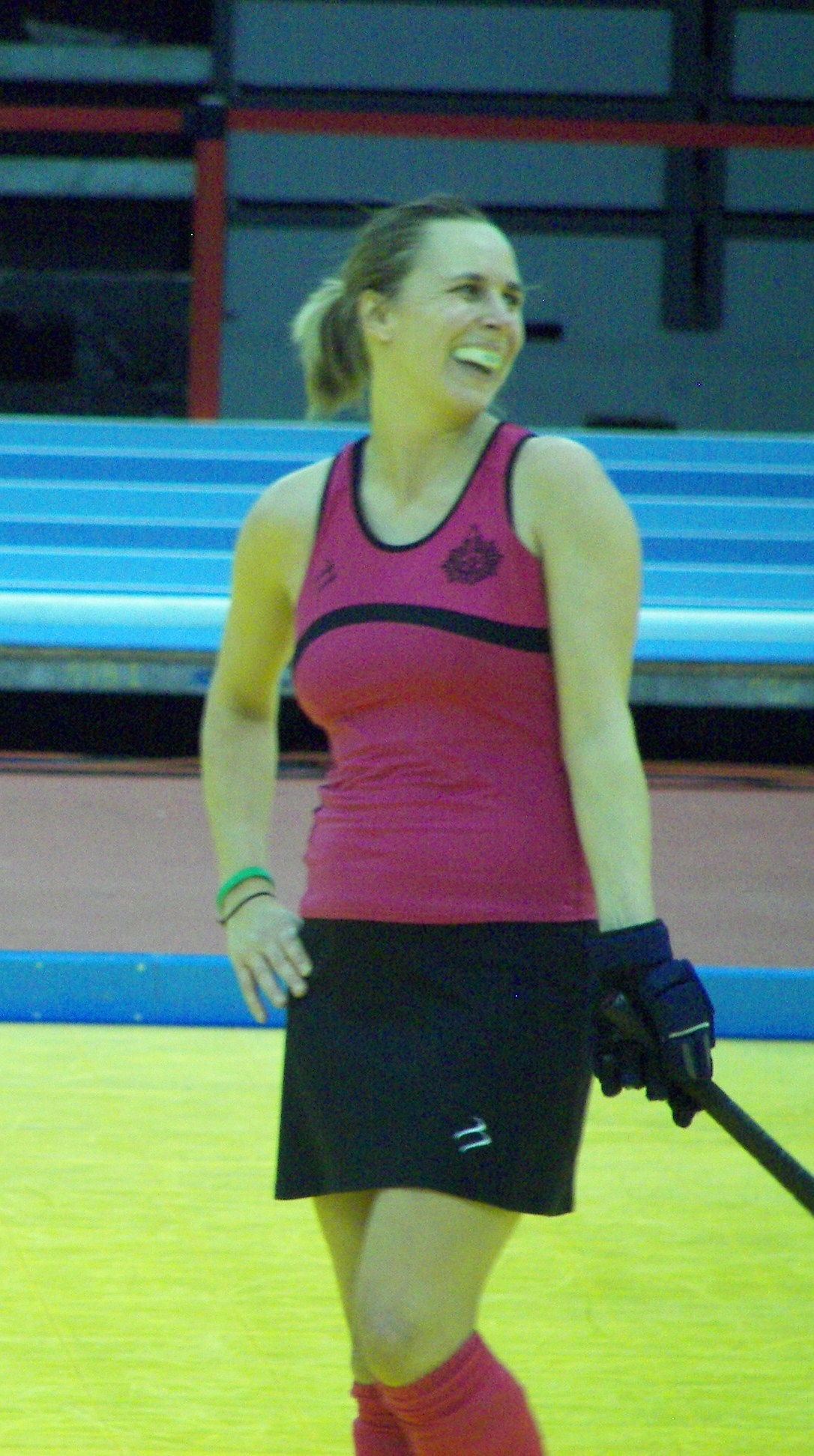

Personal information
- Full name: Jane Caroline Smith
- Born: 5 April 1969 (age 57)

Sport
- Sport: Field hockey
Medal record
Women's field hockey
Representing England
Commonwealth Games
Silver medal – second place	1998 Kuala Lumpur	Team
Silver medal – second place	2002 Manchester	Team
European Nations Cup
Gold medal – first place	1991 Brussels	Team

Jane Caroline Smith (born 5 April 1969) is a British Olympic field hockey team member. She represented England and won a silver medal, at the 1998 Commonwealth Games in Kuala Lumpur. Four years later she won another silver medal at the 2002 Commonwealth Games.
