= Inés Arrondo =

Argentine field hockey player

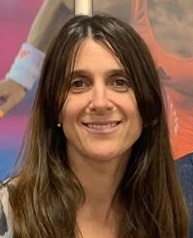

Secretary of Sports
- In office 19 December 2019 – 10 December 2023
- President: Alberto Fernández
- Preceded by: Diógenes de Urquiza
- Succeeded by: Post dissolved

Personal details
- Born: 28 November 1977 (age 48) Mar del Plata, Argentina
- Party: Independent
- Other political affiliations: Justicialist Front (2017); Frente de Todos (2019–present)
- Sports career
Medal record
Women's field hockey
Representing Argentina
Olympic Games
| Silver medal – second place | 2000 Sydney | Team |
| Bronze medal – third place | 2004 Athens | Team |
World Cup
| Gold medal – first place | 2002 Perth | Team |
Champions Trophy
| Gold medal – first place | 2001 Amstelveen | Team |
| Silver medal – second place | 2002 Macau | Team |
| Bronze medal – third place | 2004 Rosario | Team |
Pan American Games
| Gold medal – first place | 1999 Winnipeg | Team |
| Gold medal – first place | 2003 Santo Domingo | Team |

Inés Arrondo (Spanish pronunciation: [iˈnes aˈrondo]; born 28 November 1977) is a retired field hockey player from Argentina, who won the silver medal with the national women's hockey team at the 2000 Summer Olympics in Sydney and a bronze medal at the 2004 Summer Olympics in Athens. Inés has also won the World Cup in 2002 and the Champions Trophy in 2001.

Having retired from her sporting career, she entered politics in 2017 when she ran for a seat in the Buenos Aires Province Senate in the Justicialist Front list, led by Florencio Randazzo. She failed to win a seat. From 2019 to 2023, she has been Secretary of Sports in Argentina's Ministry of Tourism and Sports, working alongside minister Matías Lammens. She is the first woman to hold the post.
