= Kim Jin-kyoung =

South Korean hockey player (born 1981)

Personal information
- Nationality: South Korean
- Born: 22 March 1981 (age 45)

Sport
- Sport: Field hockey
Medal record
Women's field hockey
Representing South Korea
Asian Games
Silver medal – second place	2002 Busan	Team
Asia Cup
Silver medal – second place	2007 Hong Kong

Kim Jin-kyoung (born 22 March 1981) is a South Korean former field hockey player. She competed at the 2004 Summer Olympics and the 2008 Summer Olympics.
