= Naoko Saito =

Japanese field hockey player

Medal record

Women's field hockey

Representing Japan

Asian Games
Bronze medal – third place	2002 Busan	Team

Asia Cup
Silver medal – second place	2004 New Delhi	

Naoko Saito (齋藤 尚子, Saitō Naoko; born 25 July 1976) is a Japanese former field hockey player who competed in the 2004 Summer Olympics.
