= Yukari Yamamoto =

Japanese field hockey player

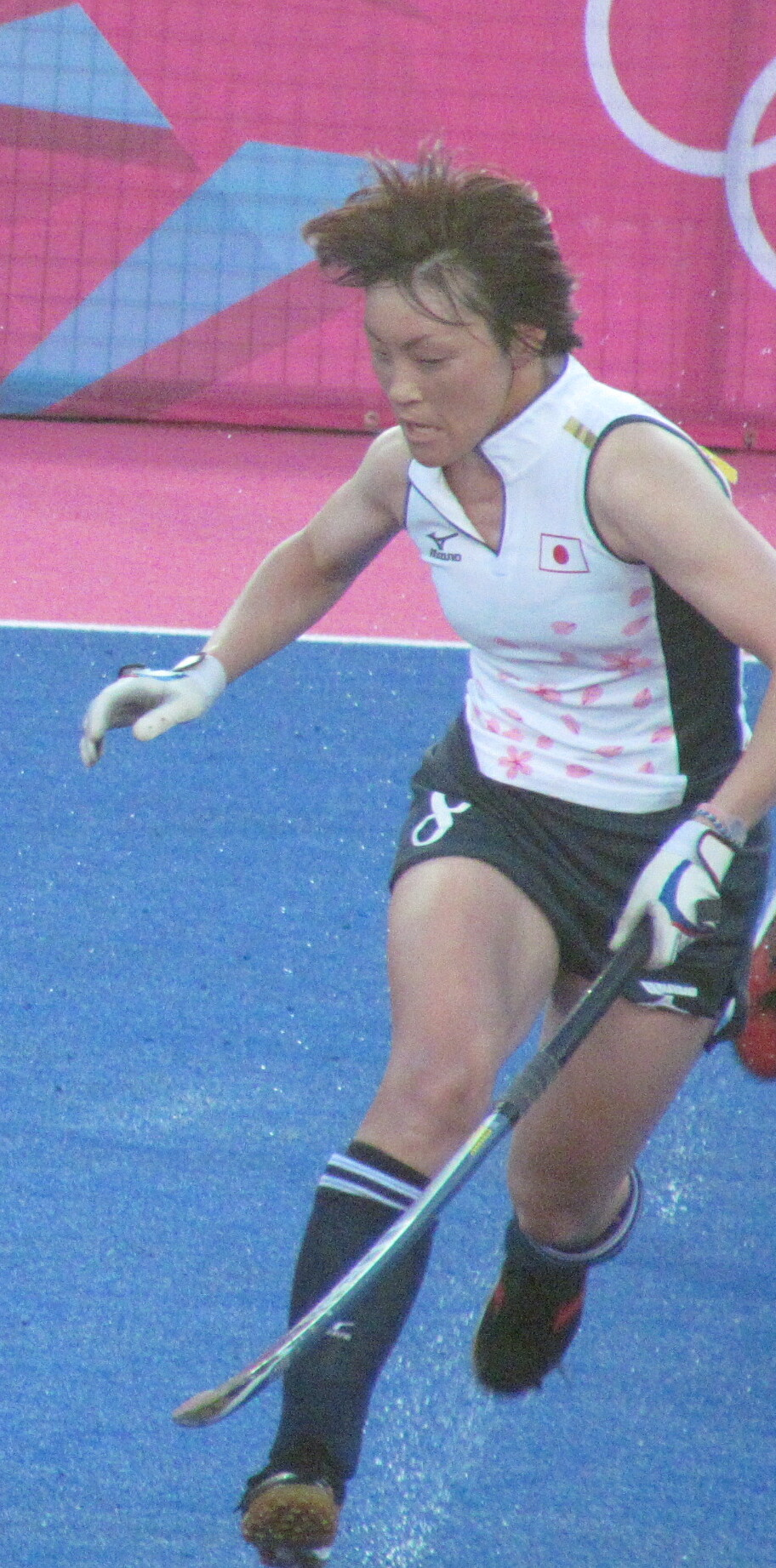

Personal information
- Born: 31 May 1981 (age 45) Okuizumo, Japan

Sport
- Sport: Field hockey
National team
Years	Team	Caps	Goals
2004-2015	Japan	227	(7)
Medal record
Women's field hockey
Representing Japan
Asian Games
Silver medal – second place	2006 Doha	Team
Bronze medal – third place	2002 Busan	Team
Bronze medal – third place	2010 Guangzhou	Team
Asian Champions Trophy
Silver medal – second place	2010 Busan
Bronze medal – third place	2011 Ordos

Yukari Yamamoto (山本 由佳理, Yamamoto Yukari; born 31 May 1981) is a Japanese field hockey player who competed in the 2004 Summer Olympics, the 2008 Summer Olympics and the 2012 Summer Olympics.
