= Silvia Muñoz =

Spanish field hockey player (born 1979)

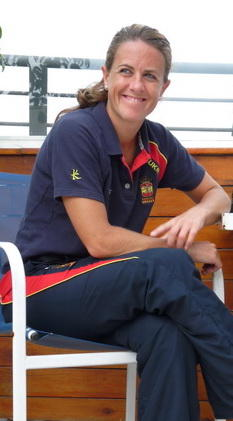
- Muñoz in 2011

Personal information
- Born: 18 September 1979 (age 46)
Medal record
Women's field hockey
Representing Spain
Champions Challenge
Silver medal – second place	2003 Catania	Team Competition

Silvia Muñoz Escudé (born 18 September 1979 in Terrassa, Catalonia) is a field hockey midfielder and striker from Spain. She represented her native country at three consecutive Olympic Games: 2000, 2004, and 2008. Muñoz captained the Spain national team that finished fourth at the 2006 Women's Hockey World Cup in Madrid, where they missed the bronze medal match against Argentina due to injury.

== Sources ==
- Spanish Olympic Committee
