= Núria Camón =

Spanish field hockey player (born 1978)

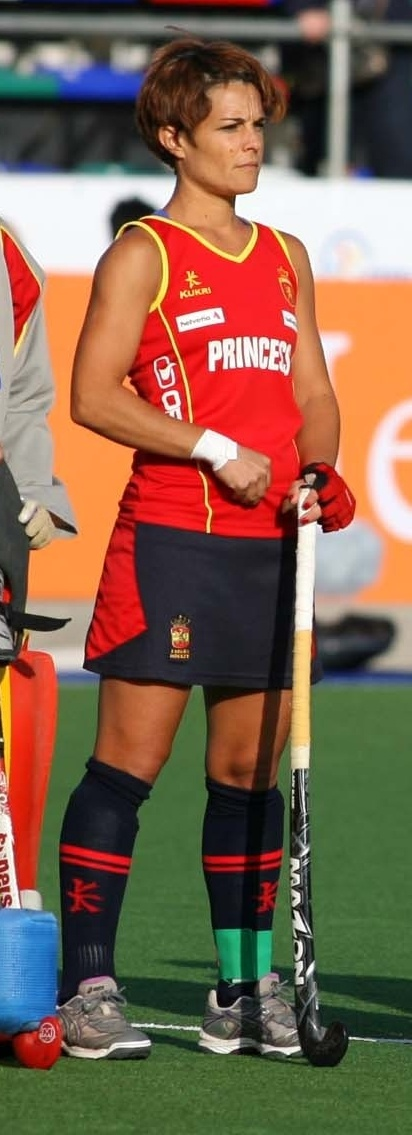
2010 Field Hockey World Cup

Núria Camón Farell (born 3 March 1978 in Terrassa, Barcelona) is a Spanish former field hockey player who competed in the 2000, 2004, and 2008 Summer Olympics.
