= Sharne Wehmeyer =

South African field hockey player

Medal record

Representing South Africa

All Africa Games
Gold medal – first place	2003 Abuja, Nigeria	

Africa Cup of Nations
Gold medal – first place	2005 Pretoria	

Sharne Wehmeyer (born 11 April 1980) is a South African former field hockey player who competed in the 2004 Summer Olympics.
