= Linda Clement =

Scottish field hockey player

Linda Clement (born 13 March 1980) is a female field hockey forward and midfielder from Scotland. She played in 241 matches for the Women's National Team, scoring 61 goals.

Clement was born in Inverness and raised on the Black Isle, attending Fortrose Academy before she move to Edinburgh to study. She was selected for the Highland District under-16 and then under-18 hockey squads before representing Scotland at under-18 level. Clement had also been involved with athletics during her school days and represented Scotland in the 300 metres at under-17 level in 1996.

Clement made her debut for the Women's National Team in 1999. Clement played in four consecutive Commonwealth Games tournaments: Manchester, Melbourne and Dehli and Glasgow. She was selected as captain of the Women's National Team for the 2014 Commonwealth Games. She announced her retirement from international competition in August 2014.

She played club hockey for Bonagrass Grove. Clement teaches physical education and is the head of hockey at the High School of Dundee in Scotland.
