= Lieve van Kessel =

Dutch field hockey player

Medal record

Representing the Netherlands

Women's Field hockey

Olympic Games
Silver medal – second place	2004 Athens	Team

Lieve van Kessel (born 15 September 1977, Amsterdam) is a Dutch field hockey player.

Van Kessel won a silver medal at the 2004 Summer Olympics in Athens.
