= Kim Yun-mi (field hockey) =

South Korean hockey player

Personal information
- Nationality: South Korean
- Born: 31 August 1980 (age 45)

Sport
- Sport: Field hockey
Medal record
Women's field hockey
Representing South Korea
Asian Games
| Silver medal – second place | 2002 Busan | Team |

Kim Yun-mi (born 31 August 1980) is a South Korean former field hockey player. She competed in the women's tournament at the 2004 Summer Olympics.
