= Minke Booij =

Dutch field hockey player

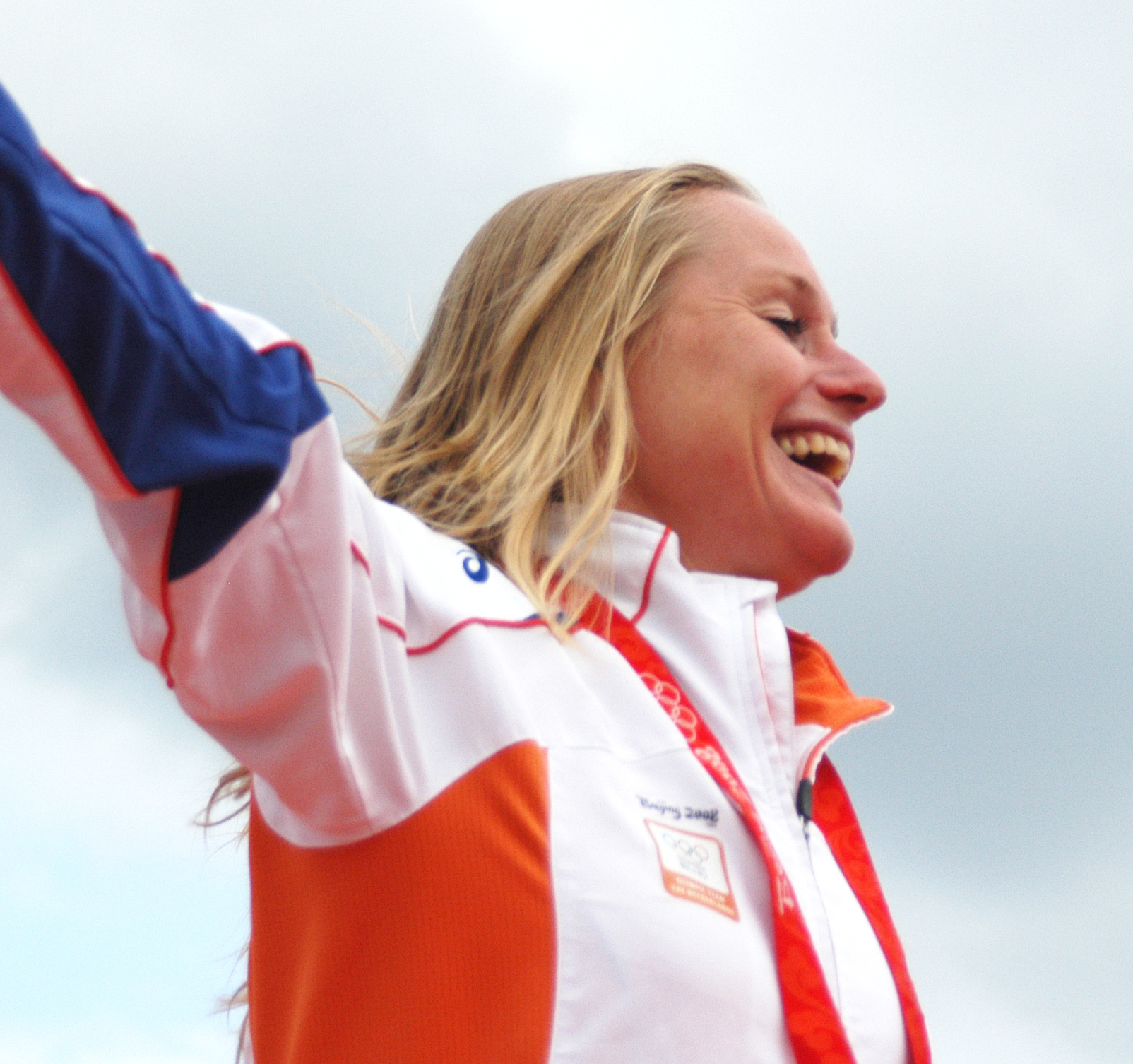

Medal record

Women's field hockey

Representing the Netherlands

Olympic Games
Gold medal – first place	2008 Beijing	Team competition
Silver medal – second place	2004 Athens	Team competition
Bronze medal – third place	2000 Sydney	Team competition

World Cup
Gold medal – first place	2006 Madrid	Team competition
Silver medal – second place	2002 Perth	Team competition

European Championship
Gold medal – first place	1999 Cologne	Team competition
Gold medal – first place	2005 Dublin	Team competition
Silver medal – second place	2007 Manchester	Team competition

Champions Trophy
Gold medal – first place	2000 Amstelveen	Team competition
Gold medal – first place	2004 Rosario	Team competition
Gold medal – first place	2005 Canberra	Team competition
Gold medal – first place	2007 Quilmes	Team competition
Silver medal – second place	1999 Brisbane	Team competition
Silver medal – second place	2001 Amstelveen	Team competition
Bronze medal – third place	2002 Macau	Team competition
Bronze medal – third place	2006 Amstelveen	Team competition

Minke Gertine Booij (born 24 January 1977 in Zaanstad) is a Dutch field hockey player, who played more than 150 international matches for the Netherlands national team since her debut, on 9 September 1998 in a friendly match against Japan.

Awards
Preceded by (Argentina) Luciana Aymar	WorldHockey Player of the Year; 2006	Succeeded by (Argentina) Luciana Aymar
