= Keiko Miura =

Japanese field hockey player

Medal record

Women's field hockey

Representing Japan

Asian Games
Silver medal – second place	2006 Doha	Team
Bronze medal – third place	2002 Busan	Team
Bronze medal – third place	2010 Guangzhou	Team

Asia Cup
Gold medal – first place	2007 Hong Kong	
Silver medal – second place	2004 New Delhi	

Champions Challenge
Bronze medal – third place	2003 Catania	

Keiko Miura (三浦恵子, Miura Keiko; born 16 March 1975 in Gifu, Gifu Prefecture) is a female field hockey field player from Japan, who is playing for Sony Bravia Ladies. She plays as a defender and is the striker of the penalty corner in her league team as well as the national team. She can strike the ball up to 120 km/h.

She was the team captain of the women's national team that participated in the 2004 Summer Olympics in Athens, Greece as well as a member of the team of the women's national team that participated in the 2008 Summer Olympics in Beijing, China.
