= Erdoitza Goikoetxea =

Spanish field hockey player (born 1975)

Erdoitza Goikoetxea Zornoza (born 24 January 1975 in Bilbao) is a former Spanish field hockey player who competed in the 2000 Summer Olympics and in the 2004 Summer Olympics.
