= Park Jeong-sook =

South Korean hockey player (born 1981)

Personal information
- Nationality: South Korean
- Born: 28 August 1981 (age 44)

Sport
- Sport: Field hockey
Medal record
Women's field hockey
Representing South Korea
Asian Games
Silver medal – second place	2002 Busan	Team

Park Jeong-sook (born 28 March 1981) is a South Korean former field hockey player. She competed at the 2004 Summer Olympics and the 2008 Summer Olympics.
