= Sakae Morimoto =

Japanese field hockey player

Personal information
- Born: January 20, 1977 (age 49)
Medal record
Women's field hockey
Representing Japan
Asian Games
Silver medal – second place	2006 Doha	Team
Bronze medal – third place	2002 Busan	Team
Asia Cup
Gold medal – first place	2007 Hong Kong
Silver medal – second place	2004 New Delhi
Champions Challenge
Bronze medal – third place	2003 Catania

Sakae Morimoto (Japanese: 森本 さかえ; born January 20, 1977, in Tenri, Nara) is a field hockey player from Japan. Affiliated with the Tenri University she played for the Japan women's national field hockey team, at two Summer Olympics, in 2004 and 2008.
