= O Go-un =

South Korean hockey player

Personal information
- Nationality: South Korean
- Born: 29 December 1980 (age 45)

Sport
- Sport: Field hockey
Medal record
Women's field hockey
Representing South Korea
Asian Games
Silver medal – second place	2002 Busan	Team

O Go-un (born 29 December 1980) is a South Korean former field hockey player. She competed at the 2000 Summer Olympics and the 2004 Summer Olympics.
