= Women's field hockey Qualifying Tournaments for the 2008 Summer Olympics squads =

The Women's field hockey Qualifying Tournaments for the 2008 Summer Olympics was a series of events in which teams compete for qualification for the 2008 Summer Olympics. Each team has a squad of up to 18 players with random jersey numbers.

== Qualifying 1 ==
=== Azerbaijan ===
Coach: Tahir Zaman

4. Emine Muzaffarova
5. Zarifahon Zeynalova
6. Feruza Makayeva
7. Lyudmila Chegurko
8. Dilfuza Mirzaliyeva (C)
10. Marina Aliyeva
11. Myungsoon Mammadova
15. Liana Nuriyeva
17. Seon Yeong Rustamova
18. Bo Kyung Alizada
19. Mi Kyung Alieva
20. Viktoriya Shahbazova (GK)
21. Yu Jin Avodonina (GK)
22. Zhang Suleymanova
23. Zhun Mammadova
25. Inoyathon Jafarova
27. Ji Eun Khudiyeva
30. Nazira Hidayatova

=== Belarus ===
Coach: Nina Dashko

1. Yulia Lashuk (C)
2. Natallia Ambros
3. Hanna Kisel
4. Ryta Zhylianina
5. Volha Tarashcik
6. Mariya Halinovskaya
7. Yuliya Laptsevich
8. Alena Nekhai
9. Natallia Varabiova
10. Iryna Kazachok
11. Hanna Basarevskaya
13. Mariya Korzh-Tsepun
14. Alesia Vasilyeva
15. Sviatlana Bahushevich
16. Alesia Tratsiakova
17. Yuliya Mikheichyk
18. Alesia Piotukh
20. Nadzeya Vladzimirava (GK, C)

=== Chile ===
Coach: Alfredo Castro

1. Constanza Abud (GK)
2. Sofía Walbaum
3. Andrea Sánchez
4. Javiera Villagra
5. Paula Infante
6. Michelle Wilson (C)
7. Daniela Infante
8. Carolina García
9. Fernanda Rodriguez
10. María José Fernández
11. Beatriz Albertz
12. Claudia Schüler (GK)
13. Camila Caram
14. Carolina Varas
15. Daniela Caram
16. Camila Infante
17. Denise Infante
18. Sandra Wenz

=== Kenya ===
Coach: Frederick Masibo

1. Josephina Ataro (GK)
2. Carole Okoth
3. Teresa Juma (C)
4. Michelle Morgan
5. Linet Onyango
6. Nerica Kuguru
7. Donner Ingumba
8. Rose Mbulo
9. Jane Ndirangu
10. Dorsilla Agunda
11. Jacqueline Otieno
12. Lillian Kimeu
13. Esther Mulli
14. Winnie Ngeno
15. Judith Owino
16. Flavian Amuhaya (GK)
17. Nomalizo Owuor
18. Lillian Aura

=== Spain ===
Coach: Pablo Usoz

1. María Jesús Rosa (GK)
2. Julia Menéndez
3. Rocio Ybarra
5. Paula Dabanch
7. Barbara Malda
9. Silvia Muñoz (C)
10. Silvia Bonastre
11. María Romagosa
12. Marta Ejarque
13. Raquel Huertas
14. Pilar Sánchez
17. Núria Camón
19. María Lopéz (GK)
21. Esther Termens
22. Gloria Comerma
23. Georgina Oliva
24. Marta Fabregas
26. Yurena Panadero

=== Ukraine ===
Coach: Svitlana Makayeva

1. Tetiana Stepanchenko (GK)
2. Yevheniya Moroz
3. Olga Gulenko
4. Olena Fritche
5. Olena Ivakhnenko
8. Tetyana Kobzenko (C)
9. Maryna Khilko
10. Nataliya Vasyukova
11. Maryna Vynohradova
12. Yana Vorushylo
13. Halyna Hlynenko
14. Tetyana Salenko
15. Bohdana Sadova
16. Alvina Budonna (GK)
18. Diana Tahiyeva
19. Juliia Nonko
20. Olena Derkach
21. Yana Sitalo

== Qualifying 2 ==
=== Belgium ===
Coach: Michel van den Boer

1. Nadine Khouzam (GK)
2. Caroline Guisset
3. Margaux Grossen
4. Astrid Vervaet
5. Morgane Vouche
7. Olivia Bouche
8. Valerie Vermeersch
9. Valerie Herbert
10. Lola Danhaive
11. An Christiaens (C)
12. Gaelle Valcke
13. Louise Cavenaile
15. Charlotte De Vos
16. Carole Dembour
17. Anne-Sophie Van Regemortel
18. Elizabeth Achten (GK)
19. Valentine Van Vyve
23. Sofie Gierts.

=== France ===
Coach: Steve Colledge

1. Salomé Dain
2. Géraldine Bonenfant
3. Marie-Céline Lamas
5. Juliette Heven
6. Emilie Begue
7. Fanny Verrier
8. Claire Sansonetti
9. Charlotte Boyer
10. Perrine Roger
12. Philippine Berly
13. Gwenaelle Dutel
17. Margaux de Galzain
19. Athena Richard
20. Sunita D'Hallain
21. Justine Duby
22. Elise Preney
28. Anabelle Got (GK)
32. Marion Rheby (GK, C)

=== India ===
Coach: Maharaj Krishan Kaushik

1. Marita Tirkey (GK)
2. Binita Toppo
3. Suman Bala
4. Rajwinder Kaur
5. Asunta Lakra
7. Rosalind Ralte
9. Surinder Kaur
10. Mamta Kharab (C)
12. Dipika Murthy (GK)
14. Ritu Rani
17. Gagandeep Kaur
18. Jasjeet Kaur Handa
24. Saba Anjum Karim
26. Deepika Thakur
27. Ranjita Devi Thockchom
28. Rani Devi
29. Pritam Rani Siwach
30. Subhadra Pradhan

=== Netherlands Antilles ===
Coach: Bas Swildens

1. Marlieke van de Pas (GK)
2. Sanne Pouwels (GK)
3. Marlies van der Stel
4. Theresia Noorlander
5. Jolanda Clemens
6. Anika de Haas
7. Ernestina Schreuder (C)
8. Charlotte Heuvelings
9. Anne-Maaike Elsen
11. Sanne van Donk
12. Juliette Plantenga
13. Claire Visser
14. Pauline Roels
15. Maria Hinskens
16. Paulien Eigenhuis
17. Bernadette Wesdorp
18. Floortje Joosten
19. Kim de Haas

=== Russia ===
Coach: Valentina Apelganets

1. Galina Terenteva (GK)
2. Elvira Komissarova
3. Ekaterina Cherkasova
4. Svetlana Nikonova
5. Svetlana Grigorieva
6. Tatiana Lastochkina
7. Maria Nikitina
8. Elena Svirskaya (C)
9. Anna Guteneva
11. Olga Shentsova
12. Irina Ospitova
15. Marina Dudko
16. Margarita Drepenkina
17. Irina Kuzmina
18. Anna Matersheva
19. Oxana Serezhkina (GK)
20. Kristina Mozgovaya
21. Daria Vasileva

=== United States ===
Coach: Lee Bodimeade

2. Melissa Leonetti
3. Angela Loy
4. Kelly Doton
7. Jesse Gey
8. Rachel Dawson
10. Tiffany Snow
13. Keli Smith
15. Dana Sensenig
16. Barbara Weinberg (GK)
17. Carrie Lingo
19. Caroline Nichols
22. Kate Barber (C)
23. Katelyn Falgowski
24. Dina Rizzo
25. Amy Tran (GK)
26. Kayla Bashore
27. Lauren Crandall
28. Lauren Powle

== Qualifying 3 ==
=== Canada ===
Coach: Sally Bell

1. Cailie O'Hara
3. Megan Anderson
4. Carly Dickson
6. Philippa Kedgley
8. Stephanie Jameson
9. Katie Rushton
10. Christine DePape
11. Sarah Forbes (GK)
13. Stephanie Hume (C)
14. Katie Baker
15. Hilary Linton
17. Marian Dickinson
18. Kim Buker
19. Andrea Rushton
20. Kathryn Gillis
22. Tiffany Michaluk
27. Clare Linton
32. Azelia Liu

=== Ireland ===
Coach: Gene Muller

1. Mary Goode (GK)
2. Louisa Healy (GK)
5. Cliodhna Sargent
6. Eimear Cregan (C)
7. Emma Clarke
8. Emma Stewart
9. Bridget McKeever
10. Shirley McCay
11. Jenny McDonough
12. Cathy McKean
13. Alexandra Speers
14. Julia O'Halloran
15. Ciara O'Brien
16. Louisa Moore
17. Nikki Symmons
19. Hollie Moffett
22. Lisa Jacob
26. Clare Perkhill

=== Italy ===
Coach: Fernando Ferrara

1. Roberta Lilliu (GK)
2. Stella Girotti (C)
3. Romina Dinucci
4. Simona Berrino
5. Carolina Scandroli
6. Paola Lombardi
7. Francesca Zucca
8. Maria Victoria Corso
9. Francesca Faustini
10. Daniela Possali
11. Jasbeer Singh
12. Paula Calvo (GK)
13. Francesca Zamboni
14. Alejandra Blanco
15. Julieta Obrist
16. Matilde Canavosio
17. Chiara Tiddi
21. Valentina Quaranta

=== South Korea ===
Coach: Han Jin-Soo

1. Lim Ju-Young (C, GK)
3. Cho Hye-Sook
7. Lee Seon-Ok
8. Kim Jung-Hee
9. Park Mi-Hyun
10. Kim Jin-Kyoung
11. Kim Mi-Seon
12. Kim Jong-Eun
14. Eom Mi-Young
15. Gim Sung-Hee
16. Moon Young-Hui (GK)
17. Lim Seon-Mee
18. Park Jeong-Sook
19. Kim Eun-Siil
21. Seo Hye-Jin
22. Kim Da-Rae
23. Lee Young-Sil
27. Cheon Seul-Ki

=== Malaysia ===
Coach: Yahya Atan

1. Farah Ayuni Yahya (GK)
2. Rosmah Asrin
3. Intan Nurairah Ahmad Khushaini
4. Sebah Kari
5. Noor Hasliza Md Ali
8. Juliani Mohamad Din
9. Norfaraha Hashim (C)
11. Nurul Nadia Md Mokhtar
12. Chitra Devi Arumugam
13. Kannagi Arumugam
14. Nadia Abdul Rahman
15. Norbaini Hashim
17. Siti Rahmah Othman
18. Siti Sarah Nurfarahah Ismail
19. Fazilla Sylvester Silin
21. Nuraini Abdul Rashid
25. Marlia Mohamed
26. Ernawati Mahmud (GK)

=== Uruguay ===
Coach: Diana Pazos

1. Paula Pérez
2. Maite de María
3. Florencia Curutchague
4. Alessandra Raso
5. Agustina Nieto
6. Victoria Bassainzteguy
7. Teresa Algorta
8. Cardina Gibernau
9. Virginia Bessio
10. Magdalena Cristiani
11. Sofía Sanguinetti
12. Noel de los Santos
13. Mercedes Coates
14. Sofía Mora
15. Virginia Casabo
16. José Fernández
17. Marsha Stanley
