= Women's field hockey Qualifying Tournaments for the 2008 Summer Olympics =

The Women's field hockey Qualifying Tournaments for the 2008 Summer Olympics was a qualification tournament that determined the final three spots for the 2008 Summer Olympics. The qualifying tournament, which involved 18 teams divided into three groups, with three separate qualifying tournaments, was held in Azerbaijan, Russia and Canada, at different times in 2008. Only the following winners of each qualifying tournament earned a berth in the 2008 Summer Olympics: Spain, United States, and South Korea.

== Teams ==
Below is a list of the 18 teams participating in this qualifying tournament:

Zone	Tournament	Qualifier(s)
Asia≤	2006 Asian Games	India; South Korea; Malaysia; Chinese Taipei
Africa	2007 African Olympic Qualifier	Kenya
Americas	2007 Pan American Games	United States; Chile; Netherlands Antilles; Canada; Cuba
Europe	2007 EuroHockey Nations Championship	Spain; Azerbaijan; Ireland; Italy; Ukraine
Europe	2007 EuroHockey Nations Trophy	Belarus; Belgium; Russia

In addition, the International Hockey Federation also named three reserve teams after two of the above teams failed to make it in this qualifying tournament (two of them already confirmed to be in the reserve list):

1. France (replace Chinese Taipei in Qualifying 2)
2. Uruguay (replace Cuba in Qualifying 3)

== Qualifier 1 ==
Qualifier 1
Tournament details
- Host country: Baku
- City: Azerbaijan
- Dates: 12–20 April
- Teams: 6 (from 3 confederations)
- Venue: Atasport HC

Final positions
- Champions: Spain
- Runner-up: Azerbaijan
- Third place: Chile

Tournament statistics
- Matches played: 18
- Goals scored: 87 (4.83 per match)
- Top scorer: (Spain) Bárbara Malda (8 goals)
- Best player: (Azerbaijan) Inoyathon Jafarova
- Best goalkeeper: (Spain) María Jesús Rosa

Qualifier 1 was held at Atasport HC in Baku, Azerbaijan from 12 to 20 April 2008.

=== Results ===
All times local (UTC+5).

==== Pool ====
Pos	Team	Pld	W	D	L	GF	GA	GD	Pts	Qualification
1	Spain	5	5	0	0	25	1	+24	15	Final
2	Azerbaijan (H)	5	4	0	1	23	5	+18	12	Final
3	Ukraine	5	3	0	2	11	9	+2	9	
4	Chile	5	2	0	3	10	10	0	6	
5	Belarus	5	1	0	4	5	12	−7	3	
6	Kenya	5	0	0	5	0	37	−37	0	

Source: FIH
Rules for classification: 1) points; 2) goal difference; 3) goals scored; 4) head-to-head result.
(H) Hosts

Players for the Kenyan team are back in the tournament after recently withdrawing due to political turmoil in their country.

==== Fixtures ====
12 April 2008
11:05

Spain	4–0	Belarus
Romagosa 31'; Malda 36', 47'; Huertas 55'

Umpires:
Julie Ashton-Lucy (AUS)
Jean Duncan (GBR)

12 April 2008
13:05

Ukraine	6–0	Kenya
Vynohradova 23', 56', 61'; Salenko 33'; Sadova 38'; Ivakhnenko 70'

Umpires:
Carol Metchette (IRL)
Caroline Brunekreef (NED)

12 April 2008
16:05

Chile	1–2	Azerbaijan
Da. Infante 56'		Mirzaliyeva 11'; Jafarova 49'

Umpires:
Soledad Iparaguirre (ARG)
Lesley Nunn (RSA)

13 April 2008
11:35

Belarus	0–2	Ukraine
		Tahiyeva 40'; Vynohradova 69'

Umpires:
Chen Hong (CHN)
Carol Metchette (IRL)

13 April 2008
14:05

Chile	0–5	Spain
		Huertas 2'; Camón 25'; Malda 29', 54'; Romagosa 49'

Umpires:
Jean Duncan (SCO)
Lesley Nunn (RSA)

13 April 2008
16:35

Azerbaijan	13–0	Kenya
Suleymanova 4'; Nuriyeva 9'; Aliyeva 14', 24', 42', 48', 68'; Zeynalova 17', 53'; Mirzaliyeva 18'; Mammadova 43', 45', 50'

Umpires:
Julie Ashton-Lucy (AUS)
Caroline Brunekreef (NED)

15 April 2008
12:05

Kenya	0–5	Chile
		Villagra 8', 70'; Rodriguez 54'; Fernandez 62'; P. Infante 66'

Umpires:
Jean Duncan (GBR)
Chen Hong (CHN)

15 April 2008
14:35

Spain	3–1	Ukraine
Camón 12'; Termens 52'; Ybarra 65'		Tahiyeva 16'

Umpires:
Julie Ashton-Lucy (AUS)
Soledad Iparraguirre (ARG)

15 April 2008
17:05

Azerbaijan	3–0	Belarus
Mammadova 51'; Zeynalova 55'; Aliyeva 62'

Umpires:
Carol Metchette (IRL)
Caroline Brunekreef (NED)

16 April 2008
12:35

Ukraine	2–1	Chile
Vynohradova 6'; Sadova 53'		Da. Infante 8'

Umpires:
Jean Duncan (GBR)
Carol Metchette (IRL)

16 April 2008
15:05

Belarus	4–0	Kenya
Tratsiakova 41'; Laptsevich 47', 69'; Piotukh 70'

Umpires:
Lesley Nunn (RSA)
Chen Hong (CHN)

16 April 2008
17:05

Spain	4–0	Azerbaijan
Muñoz 12'; Huertas 20'; Ybarra 24', 39'

Umpires:
Soledad Iparraguirre (ARG)
Julie Ashton-Lucy (AUS)

18 April 2008
12:05

Kenya	0–9	Spain
		Malda 2', 9', 29', 61'; Camón 15', 24'; Termens 25'; Huertas 52', 55'

Umpires:
Carol Metchette (IRL)
Lesley Nunn (RSA)

18 April 2008
14:35

Chile	3–1	Belarus
C. Infante 25', 26'; P. Infante 47'		Tratsiakova 50'

Umpires:
Soledad Iparraguirre (ARG)
Caroline Brunekreef (NED)

18 April 2008
17:05

Azerbaijan	5–0	Ukraine
Mammadova 6'; Jafarova 12'; Mirzaliyeva 16'; Suleymanova 47'; Alizada 70'

Umpires:
Julie Ashton-Lucy (AUS)
Jean Duncan (GBR)

==== Classification ====
===== Fifth and sixth place =====
20 April 2008
11:05

Belarus	5–0	Kenya
Zhylianina 12'; Piotukh 19'; Tratsiakova 37'; Ambros 46'; Kazachok 63'

Umpires:
Caroline Brunekreef (NED)
Chen Hong (CHN)

===== Third and fourth place =====
20 April 2008
13:35

Ukraine	1–2	Chile
Sadova 5'		Caram 47'; De. Infante 65'

Umpires:
Lesley Nunn (RSA)
Soledad Iparraguirre (ARG)

===== Final =====
20 April 2008
16:05

Spain	3–2	Azerbaijan
Muñoz 3', 47', 67'		Mirzaliyeva 31', 60'

Umpires:
Jean Duncan (GBR)
Julie Ashton-Lucy (AUS)

=== Awards ===
Top scorer	Player of the Tournament	Goalkeeper of the Tournament
(Spain) Barbara Malda	(Azerbaijan) Inoyathon Jafarova	(Spain) María Jesús Rosa

=== Final standings ===
As per statistical convention in field hockey, matches decided in extra time are counted as wins and losses, while matches decided by penalty shoot-outs are counted as draws.

Pos	Team	Pld	W	D	L	GF	GA	GD	Pts	Qualification
1st place, gold medalist(s)	Spain	6	6	0	0	28	3	+25	18	Qualified for 2008 Summer Olympics
2nd place, silver medalist(s)	Azerbaijan (H)	6	4	0	2	25	8	+17	12	
3rd place, bronze medalist(s)	Chile	6	3	0	3	12	11	+1	9	
4	Ukraine	6	3	0	3	12	11	+1	9	
5	Belarus	6	2	0	4	10	12	−2	6	
6	Kenya	6	0	0	6	0	42	−42	0	

Source: FIH
(H) Hosts

=== Goalscorers ===
There were 87 goals scored in 18 matches, for an average of 4.83 goals per match.

8 goals

- (Spain) Bárbara Malda

6 goals

- (Azerbaijan) Mi Kyung Aliyeva

5 goals

- (Azerbaijan) Myungsoon Mammadova
- (Azerbaijan) Dilfuza Mirzaliyeva
- (Ukraine) Maryna Vynohradova
- (Spain) Raquel Huertas

4 goals

- (Spain) Núria Camón
- (Spain) Silvia Muñoz

3 goals

- (Azerbaijan) Zarifahon Zeynalova
- (Belarus) Alesia Tratsiakova
- (Ukraine) Bohdana Sadova
- (Spain) Rocío Ybarra

2 goals

- (Azerbaijan) Inoyathon Jafarova
- (Azerbaijan) Zhang Suleymanova
- (Belarus) Yulia Laptsevich
- (Belarus) Alesia Piotukh
- (Chile) Camila Infante
- (Chile) Daniela Infante
- (Chile) Paula Infante
- (Chile) Javiera Villagra
- (Ukraine) Diana Tahiyeva
- (Spain) María Romagosa
- (Spain) Esther Térmens

1 goal

- (Azerbaijan) Bo Kyung Alizada
- (Azerbaijan) Liana Nuriyeva
- (Belarus) Natallia Ambros
- (Belarus) Iryna Kazachok
- (Belarus) Ryta Zhylianina
- (Chile) Daniela Caram
- (Chile) María José Fernández
- (Chile) Denise Infante
- (Chile) Fernanda Rodríguez
- (Ukraine) Olena Ivakhnenko
- (Ukraine) Tetyana Salenko

== Qualifier 2 ==
Qualifier 2
Tournament details
- Host country: Russia
- City: Kazan
- Dates: 19–27 April
- Teams: 6 (from 3 confederations)
- Venue: Dinamo Kazan HC

Final positions
- Champions: United States
- Runner-up: Belgium
- Third place: Netherlands Antilles

Tournament statistics
- Matches played: 18
- Goals scored: 79 (4.39 per match)
- Top scorer: (United States) Tiffany Snow (6 goals)
- Best player: (United States) Rachel Dawson
- Best young player: (India) Rani Devi
- Best goalkeeper: (Belgium) Elizabeth Achten

Qualifier 2 was held at Dinamo Kazan HC in Kazan, Russia from 19 to 27 April 2008.

=== Results ===
All times are local (Russia Summer Time, UTC+4).

==== Pool ====
Pos	Team	Pld	W	D	L	GF	GA	GD	Pts	Qualification
1	United States	5	5	0	0	24	3	+21	15	Final
2	Belgium	5	3	1	1	13	7	+6	10	Final
3	Netherlands Antilles	5	3	0	2	10	8	+2	9	
4	India	5	2	0	3	13	10	+3	6	
5	Russia (H)	5	1	1	3	7	15	−8	4	
6	France	5	0	0	5	2	26	−24	0	

Source: FIH
Rules for classification: 1) points; 2) goal difference; 3) goals scored; 4) head-to-head result.
(H) Hosts

==== Fixtures ====
19 April 2008
11:00

United States	3–2	Belgium
Lingo 13'; Gey 29'; Loy 47'		Gierts 24'; Dembour 67'

Umpires:
Minka Woolley (AUS)
Lee Keum-Jeu (KOR)

19 April 2008
13:00

France	0–2	Netherlands Antilles
		Joosten 50'; Visser 65'

Umpires:
Elena Eskina (ESP)
Dawn Henning (GBR)

19 April 2008
17:00

Russia	1–3	India
Kuzmina 37'		Devi 9'; Handa 48'; Siwach 68'

Umpires:
Michelle Joubert (RSA)
Carolina de la Fuente (ARG)

20 April 2008
13:00

Belgium	5–0	France
De Vos 2'; Dembour 21', 36'; Vouche 49'; Vervaet 66'

Umpires:
Minka Woolley (AUS)
Michelle Joubert (RSA)

20 April 2008
15:00

India	1–2	Netherlands Antilles
Devi 43'		Visser 31'; Hinskens 55'

Umpires:
Marelize de Klerk (RSA)
Lee Keum-Jeu (KOR)

20 April 2008
17:00

Russia	0–7	United States
		Snow 3', 15', 41'; Smith 9'; Lingo 14'; Loy 16'; Sensenig 22'

Umpires:
Dawn Henning (GBR)
Monica Rivera (ESP)

22 April 2008
12:00

United States	7–0	France
Falgowski 27'; Snow 43'; Smith 46'; Loy 46', 54'; Leonetti 69'; Dawson 70'

Umpires:
Carolina de la Fuente (ARG)
Monica Rivera (ESP)

22 April 2008
16:00

India	2–3	Belgium
Bala 13'; Rani 16'		De Vos 1'; Vervaet 47'; Valcke 58'

Umpires:
Marelize de Klerk (RSA)
Elena Eskina (RUS)

22 April 2008
18:00

Netherlands Antilles	3–1	Russia
Roels 2'; Van Donk 13'; Joosten 52'		Kuzmina 25'

Umpires:
Minka Woolley (AUS)
Michelle Joubert (RSA)

24 April 2008
12:00

Belgium	3–2	Netherlands Antilles
Gierts 51', 58'; Bouche 54'		Hinskens 21'; Van der Stel 70'

Umpires:
Carolina de la Fuente (ARG)
Marelize de Klerk (RSA)

24 April 2008
16:00

United States	4–0	India
Gey 29'; Doton 38'; Loy 45'; Lingo 48'

Umpires:
Elena Eskina (RUS)
Dawn Henning (GBR)

24 April 2008
18:00

France	2–5	Russia
Berly 10'; Bonenfant 19'		Kuzmina 2', 27'; Nikitina 9'; Shentsova 37'; Dudko 70'

Umpires:
Lee Keum-Jeu (KOR)
Monica Rivera (ESP)

26 April 2008
11:00

Netherlands Antilles	1–3	United States
Eigenhuis 23'		Barber 21'; Sensenig 26'; Snow 47'

Umpires:
Minka Woolley (AUS)
Elena Eskina (RUS)

26 April 2008
13:00

India	7–0	France
Devi 4', 54', 70'; S. Kaur 6', 44'; R. Kaur 18'; Handa 66'

Umpires:
Michelle Joubert (RSA)
Marelize de Klerk (RSA)

26 April 2008
15:00

Russia	0–0	Belgium

Umpires:
Monica Rivera (ESP)
Carolina de la Fuente (ARG)

==== Classification ====
===== Fifth and sixth place =====
27 April 2008
11:00

Russia	2–1	France
Grogorieva 28'; Shentsova 55'		Berly 33'

Umpires:
Lee Keum-Jeu (KOR)
Dawn Henning (GBR)

===== Third and fourth place =====
27 April 2008
13:30

Netherlands Antilles	2–1 (a.e.t.)	India
Schreuder 65'; Noorlander 73'		R. Kaur 28'

Umpires:
Elena Eskina (RUS)
Minka Woolley (AUS)

===== Final =====
27 April 2008
16:00

United States	3–1	Belgium
Bashore 17'; Snow 33'; Barber 58'		Van Regemortel 26'

Umpires:
Marelize de Klerk (RSA)
Carolina de la Fuente (ARG)

=== Awards ===
Top scorer	Player of the Tournament	Goalkeeper of the Tournament	Young Player of the Tournament
(United States) Tiffany Snow	(United States) Rachel Dawson	(Belgium) Elizabeth Achten	(India) Rani Devi

=== Final standings ===
As per statistical convention in field hockey, matches decided in extra time are counted as wins and losses, while matches decided by penalty shoot-outs are counted as draws.

Pos	Team	Pld	W	D	L	GF	GA	GD	Pts	Qualification
1st place, gold medalist(s)	United States	6	6	0	0	27	4	+23	18	Qualified for 2008 Summer Olympics
2nd place, silver medalist(s)	Belgium	6	3	1	2	14	10	+4	10	
3rd place, bronze medalist(s)	Netherlands Antilles	6	4	0	2	12	9	+3	12	
4	India	6	2	0	4	14	12	+2	6	
5	Russia (H)	6	2	1	3	9	16	−7	7	
6	France	6	0	0	6	3	28	−25	0	

Source: FIH
(H) Hosts

=== Goalscorers ===
There were 79 goals scored in 18 matches, for an average of 4.39 goals per match.

6 goals

- (United States) Tiffany Snow

5 goals

- (India) Rani Devi
- (United States) Angela Loy

4 goals

- (Russia) Irina Kuzmina

3 goals

- (Belgium) Carole Dembour
- (Belgium) Sofie Gierts
- (United States) Carrie Lingo

2 goals

- (Belgium) Astrid Vervaet
- (Belgium) Charlotte de Vos
- (France) Philippine Berly
- (India) Jasjeet Kaur Handa
- (India) Rajwinder Kaur
- (India) Surinder Kaur
- (Netherlands Antilles) Maria Hinskens
- (Netherlands Antilles) Floortje Joosten
- (Netherlands Antilles) Claire Visser
- (Russia) Olga Shentsova
- (United States) Kate Barber
- (United States) Jesse Gey
- (United States) Dana Sensenig
- (United States) Keli Smith

1 goal

- (Belgium) Olivia Bouche
- (Belgium) Anne-Sophie van Regemortel
- (Belgium) Gaelle Valcke
- (Belgium) Morgane Vouche
- (France) Géraldine Bonenfant
- (India) Suman Bala
- (India) Pritam Rani Siwach
- (India) Ritu Rani
- (Netherlands Antilles) Paulien Eigenhuis
- (Netherlands Antilles) Sanne van Donk
- (Netherlands Antilles) Theresia Noorlander
- (Netherlands Antilles) Pauline Roels
- (Netherlands Antilles) Ernestina Schreuder
- (Netherlands Antilles) Marlies van der Stel
- (Russia) Marina Dudko
- (Russia) Svetlana Grogorieva
- (Russia) Maria Nikitina
- (United States) Kayla Bashore
- (United States) Rachel Dawson
- (United States) Kelly Doton
- (United States) Katelyn Falgowski
- (United States) Melissa Leonetti

== Qualifier 3 ==
Qualifier 3
Tournament details
- Host country: Canada
- City: Victoria
- Dates: 26 April – 4 May
- Teams: 6 (from 3 confederations)
- Venue: University of Victoria

Final positions
- Champions: South Korea
- Runner-up: Italy
- Third place: Ireland

Tournament statistics
- Matches played: 18
- Goals scored: 66 (3.67 per match)
- Top scorer: (South Korea) Park Mi-hyun (7 goals)
- Best player: (South Korea) Park Mi-hyun
- Best goalkeeper: (Canada) Sarah Forbes

Qualifier 3 was held at the University of Victoria in Victoria, Canada from 28 April to 4 May 2008

=== Results ===
All times are local (Canada Time, UTC-7).

==== Pool ====
Pos	Team	Pld	W	D	L	GF	GA	GD	Pts	Qualification
1	South Korea	5	5	0	0	29	1	+28	15	Final
2	Italy	5	3	1	1	8	6	+2	10	Final
3	Ireland	5	3	0	2	7	7	0	9	
4	Canada (H)	5	2	0	3	7	8	−1	6	
5	Malaysia	5	1	1	3	3	9	−6	4	
6	Uruguay	5	0	0	5	0	23	−23	0	

Source: FIH
Rules for classification: 1) points; 2) goal difference; 3) goals scored; 4) head-to-head result.
(H) Hosts

==== Fixtures ====
26 April 2008
11:30

South Korea	10–0	Uruguay
Lee S. 9'; Park M. 11', 33', 48'; Gim 21'; Kim Jo. 29'; Cheon 41', 63'; Kim Ji. 42'; Eom 57'	Report

Umpires:
Wendy Stewart (CAN)
Sarah Garnett (NZL)

26 April 2008
14:00

Italy	2–1	Canada
Singh 50'; Tiddi 63'	Report	DePape 37'

Umpires:
Ute Conen (GER)
Cecilia Valenzuela (CHI)

26 April 2008
16:30

Malaysia	0–3	Ireland
	Report	Parkhill 21'; Cregan 30'; McKean 40'

Umpires:
Lisa Roach (AUS)
Miao Lin (CHN)

27 April 2008
12:00

Uruguay	0–4	Italy
	Report	Corso 37', 48', 68'; Faustini 53'

Umpires:
Stella Bartlema (NED)
Miao Lin (CHN)

27 April 2008
14:30

Ireland	2–0	Canada
McKean 10'; Parkhill 20'	Report

Umpires:
Sarah Garnett (NZL)
Kazuko Yasueda (JPN)

27 April 2008
17:00

Malaysia	0–5	South Korea
	Report	Eom 5'; Kim Jo. 20', 22'; Park M. 48'; Kim Ji. 56'

Umpires:
Ute Conen (GER)
Cecilia Valenzuela (CHI)

29 April 2008
12:30

Ireland	1–0	Uruguay
Symmons 25'	Report

Umpires:
Wendy Stewart (CAN)
Ute Conen (GER)

29 April 2008
15:00

South Korea	5–0	Italy
Kim Jo. 1', 51'; Park M. 38', 45'; Cheon 64'	Report

Umpires:
Sarah Garnett (NZL)
Lisa Roach (AUS)

29 April 2008
17:30

Canada	1–0	Malaysia
K. Rushton 37'	Report

Umpires:
Stella Bartlema (NED)
Kazuko Yasueda (JPN)

1 May 2008
12:30

South Korea	5–1	Ireland
Kim M. 14'; Seo 21', 55'; Kim Ju. 29'; Eom 60'	Report	Symmons 11'

Umpires:
Wendy Stewart (CAN)
Stella Bartlema (NED)

1 May 2008
15:00

Italy	0–0	Malaysia
	Report

Umpires:
Miao Lin (CHN)
Lisa Roach (AUS)

1 May 2008
17:30

Uruguay	0–5	Canada
	Report	Hume 4'; DePape 15'; Michaluk 17', 46'; K. Rushton 23'

Umpires:
Cecilia Valenzuela (CHI)
Sarah Garnett (NZL)

3 May 2008
11:30

Malaysia	3–0	Uruguay
Abdul Rahman 38', 44'; Asrin 68'	Report

Umpires:
Kazuko Yasueda (JPN)
Cecilia Valenzuela (CHI)

3 May 2008
14:00

Canada	0–4	South Korea
	Report	Kim D. 16', 44'; Cheon 35'; Gim 55'

Umpires:
Stella Bartlema (NED)
Ute Conen (GER)

3 May 2008
16:30

Ireland	0–2	Italy
	Report	Tiddi 56'; Faustini 62'

Umpires:
Wendy Stewart (CAN)
Lisa Roach (AUS)

==== Classification ====
===== Fifth and sixth place =====
4 May 2008
11:00

Malaysia	2–2 (a.e.t.)	Uruguay
Abdul Rahman 25'; Hashim 62'	Report	Bessio 59'; Algorta 69'
Penalties
Kari (penalty shoot-out missed); Abdul Rahman (penalty shoot-out scored); Mohamad Din (penalty shoot-out missed); Md Mokhtar (penalty shoot-out scored); Ismail (penalty shoot-out scored)	3–2	(penalty shoot-out scored) Bessio; (penalty shoot-out missed) Casabo; (penalty shoot-out scored) Sanguinetti; (penalty shoot-out missed) Algorta; (penalty shoot-out missed) Cristiani

Umpires:
Wendy Stewart (CAN)
Stella Bartlema (NED)

===== Third and fourth place =====
4 May 2008
13:30

Ireland	2–1	Canada
McDonough 6'; McKean 26'	Report	Jameson 35+'

Umpires:
Miao Lin (CHN)
Lisa Roach (AUS)

===== Final =====
4 May 2008
16:00

South Korea	5–0	Italy
Park M. 4'; Lee S. 10'; Seo 11'; Gim 16'; Kim Jo. 23'	Report

Umpires:
Sarah Garnett (NZL)
Ute Conen (GER)

=== Awards ===
Top scorer	Player of the Tournament	Goalkeeper of the Tournament	Fair Play Trophy
(South Korea) Park Mi-hyun	(South Korea) Park Mi-hyun	(Canada) Sarah Forbes	Italy

=== Final standings ===
As per statistical convention in field hockey, matches decided in extra time are counted as wins and losses, while matches decided by penalty shoot-outs are counted as draws.

Pos	Team	Pld	W	D	L	GF	GA	GD	Pts	Qualification
1st place, gold medalist(s)	South Korea	6	6	0	0	34	1	+33	18	Qualified for 2008 Summer Olympics
2nd place, silver medalist(s)	Italy	6	3	1	2	8	11	−3	10	
3rd place, bronze medalist(s)	Ireland	6	4	0	2	9	8	+1	12	
4	Canada (H)	6	2	0	4	8	10	−2	6	
5	Malaysia	6	1	2	3	5	11	−6	5	
6	Uruguay	6	0	1	5	2	25	−23	1	

Source: FIH
(H) Hosts

=== Goalscorers ===
There were 66 goals scored in 18 matches, for an average of 3.67 goals per match.

7 goals

- (South Korea) Park Mi-hyun

6 goals

- (South Korea) Kim Jong-eun

4 goals

- (South Korea) Cheon Seul-ki

3 goals

- (Ireland) Catherine McKean
- (Italy) Maria Victoria Corso
- (Malaysia) Nadia Abdul Rahman
- (South Korea) Eom Mi-young
- (South Korea) Gim Sung-hee
- (South Korea) Seo Hye-jin

2 goals

- (Canada) Christine DePape
- (Canada) Tiffany Michaluk
- (Canada) Katie Rushton
- (Ireland) Clare Parkhill
- (Ireland) Nicola Symmons
- (Italy) Francesca Faustini
- (Italy) Chiara Tiddi
- (South Korea) Kim Da-rae
- (South Korea) Kim Jin-kyoung
- (South Korea) Lee Seon-ok

1 goal

- (Canada) Stephanie Hume
- (Canada) Stephanie Jameson
- (Ireland) Eimear Cregan
- (Ireland) Jennifer McDonough
- (Italy) Jasbeer Singh
- (Malaysia) Rosmah Asrin
- (Malaysia) Norfahara Hashim
- (South Korea) Kim Jung-hee
- (South Korea) Kim Mi-seon
- (Uruguay) Teresa Algorta
- (Uruguay) Virgina Bessio
