= 2011 Women's Hockey Champions Challenge II =

Sport season in a Hockey competition

2011 Champions Challenge II
Tournament details
- Host country: Austria
- City: Vienna
- Teams: 8

Final positions
- Champions: Belgium (1st title)
- Runner-up: Italy
- Third place: Belarus

Tournament statistics
- Matches played: 24
- Goals scored: 98 (4.08 per match)
- Top scorer: (Belarus) Yuliya Mikheichyk (10 goals)
- Best player: (Belgium) Charlotte De Vos

The 2011 Women's Hockey Champions Challenge II was held from May 7–15, 2011 in Vienna, Austria. Belgium beat Italy 2–1 to win the tournament and promoted to 2012 Champions Challenge I.

== Results ==
All times are Central European Time (UTC+01:00)

=== First round ===
==== Pool A ====
Pos	Team	Pld	W	D	L	GF	GA	GD	Pts
1	Chile	3	2	0	1	7	3	+4	6
2	Italy	3	2	0	1	7	4	+3	6
3	Canada	3	2	0	1	4	3	+1	6
4	Austria	3	0	0	3	3	11	−8	0

Source: FIH
Rules for classification: 1) points; 2) goal difference; 3) goals scored; 4) head-to-head result.

7 May 2011
15:00

Chile	2–1	Italy
Urroz 7'; De. Infante 53'	Report	Tiddi 15'

Umpires:
Jean Duncan (SCO)
Natalia Kadyrova (RUS)

7 May 2011
17:30

Canada	2–1	Austria
Baker 12'; Walkey 32'	Report	Balak 62'

Umpires:
Nor Piza Hassan (MAS)
Valentina Tomasi (ITA)

8 May 2011
15:00

Canada	1–0	Chile
Gillis 38'	Report

Umpires:
Hannah Sanders (ENG)
Jean Duncan (SCO)

8 May 2011
17:30

Italy	4–1	Austria
Singh 5'; Faustini 21'; Mirabella 22'; Wybieralska 64'	Report	Sandner 23'

Umpires:
Catalina Wenzel (CHI)
Keely Dunn(CAN)

10 May 2011
15:00

Italy	2–1	Canada
Ronsisvalli 10'; Faustini 62'	Report	Jameson 53'

Umpires:
Violeta Eismayer (AUT)
Natalia Kadyrova (RUS)

10 May 2011
17:30

Chile	5 – 1	Austria
Fingerhuth 9'; Villagra 29'; Infante 37', 61'; Retamales 53'	Report	Hadamofsky 35'

Umpires:
Lludmila Aleinikoviene (BLR)
Nor Piza Hassan (MAS)

==== Pool B ====
Pos	Team	Pld	W	D	L	GF	GA	GD	Pts
1	Belarus	3	3	0	0	12	9	+3	9
2	Belgium	3	2	0	1	8	4	+4	6
3	Malaysia	3	0	1	2	7	9	−2	1
4	Russia	3	0	1	2	5	10	−5	1

Source: FIH
Rules for classification: 1) points; 2) goal difference; 3) goals scored; 4) head-to-head result.

7 May 2011
10:00

Belgium	2–1	Malaysia
Boon 36'; Vouche 53'	Report	Fazilla 14'

Umpires:
Catalina Wenzel (CHI)
Keely Dunn (CAN)

7 May 2011
12:30

Russia	3–4	Belarus
Shaburova 54'; Petrova 57'; Kuzmina 60'	Report	Zabrotskaya 21', 39'; Mikheichyk 37'; Kulinkovich 49'

Umpires:
Celine Martin-Schmets (BEL)
Hannah Sanders (ENG)

8 May 2011
10:00

Russia	0–4	Belgium
	Report	Raes 54'; De Vos 60', 64'; Coppey 70'

Umpires:
Sue Jameson (CAN)
Noraihan Bahari (MAS)

8 May 2011
12:30

Malaysia	4–5	Belarus
Fazilla 4', 32'; Nurani 16'; Arumugam 64'	Report	Mikheichyk 22', 24', 43', 50'; Zhylianina 26'

Umpires:
Natalia Kadyrova (RUS)
Violeta Eismayer (AUT)

10 May 2011
10:00

Malaysia	2–2	Russia
Siti 26'; Nadia 32'	Report	Grigoryeva 12'; Shumilina 66'

Umpires:
Celine Martin-Schmets (BEL)
Hannah Sanders (ENG)

10 May 2011
12:30

Belgium	2–3	Belarus
Sinia 13', 34'	Report	Piotukh 7'; Mikheichyk 42', 70'

Umpires:
Keely Dunn (CAN)
Jean Duncan (SCO)

=== Second round ===
Fifth place
Russia	2
Malaysia	1
Seventh place
Canada	2
Austria	1

Consolation semifinals
Russia	3
Canada	2
Malaysia	7
Austria	0

Quarterfinals
Chile	3
Russia	2
Belgium	1
Canada	0
Italy	2
Malaysia	1
Belarus	4
Austria	1

Semifinals
Chile	0
Belgium	1
Italy (a.e.t.)	3
Belarus	2

Final
Belgium	2
Italy	1
Third place
Chile	2 (1)
Belarus (p.s.o.)	2 (3)

==== Quarterfinals ====
12 May 2011
10:00

Chile	3–2	Russia
Urroz 8'; Retamales 21'; Walbaum 44'	Report	Shamina 31', 70+'

Umpires:
Hannah Sanders (ENG)
Violeta Eismayer (AUT)

12 May 2011
12:30

Belgium	1–0	Canada
Raes 55'	Report

Umpires:
Jean Duncan (SCO)
Valentina Tomasi (ITA)

12 May 2011
15:00

Italy	2–1	Malaysia
Padalino 32', 54'	Report	Fazilla 62'

Umpires:
Lludmila Aleinikoviene (BLR)
Keely Dunn (CAN)

12 May 2011
17:30

Belarus	4–1	Austria
Kulinkovich 9'; Piotukh 10'; Mikheichyk 56', 59'	Report	Balek 23'

Umpires:
Celine Martin-Schmets (BEL)
Catalina Montesino Wenzel (CHI)

==== Fifth to eighth place classification ====
===== Crossover =====
13 May 2011
15:00

Russia	3 – 2	Canada
Polovkova 17'; Shumilina 33'; Vasilyeva 68'	Report	Dickinson 11'; Walkey 49'

Umpires:
Lludmila Aleinikoviene (BLR)
Catalina Montesino Wenzel (CHI)

13 May 2011
17:30

Malaysia	7 – 0	Austria
Ruhani 3'; Ahmad Bokhari 14'; Abdul Rahman 23'; Ali 35', 36'; Mohamad Din 46'; Saad 69'	Report

Umpires:
Natalia Kadyrova (RUS)
Celine Martin-Schmets (BEL)

===== Seventh and eighth place =====
15 May 2011
9:00

Canada	2 – 1	Austria
Walker 26', 38'	Report	Strnad 56'

Umpires:
Valentina Tomasi (ITA)
Nor Piza Hassan (MAS)

===== Fifth and sixth place =====
15 May 2011
11:30

Russia	2 – 1	Malaysia
Shamina 12'; Nikitina 16'	Report	Sylvester Silin 30'

Umpires:
Violeta Eismayer (AUT)
Catalina Montesino Venzel (CHI)

==== First to fourth place classification ====
===== Semifinals =====
14 May 2011
15:00

Chile	0 – 1	Belgium
	Report	Boon 63'

Umpires:
Hannah Sanders (ENG)
Valentina Tomasi (ITA)

14 May 2011
17:30

Italy	3 – 2 (a.e.t.)	Belarus
Padalino 30'; Faustini 32'; Wybieralska 80'	Report	Shcharbakova 7'; Zabrotskaya 10'

Umpires:
Jean Duncan (SCO)
Catalina Montesino Wenzel (CHI)

===== Third and fourth place =====
15 May 2011
16:30

Chile	2 – 2	Belarus
Fingerhuth 1'; P. Infante 25'	Report	Mikheichyk 15'; Zabrotskaya 67'
Penalties
Fingerhuth (penalty shoot-out missed); De. Infante (penalty shoot-out missed); Da. Infante (penalty shoot-out scored); Urroz (penalty shoot-out missed)	1 – 3	(penalty shoot-out scored) Mikheichyk; (penalty shoot-out missed) Kulinkovich; (penalty shoot-out scored) Kurhanskaya; (penalty shoot-out scored) Zhylianina

Umpires:
Keely Dunn (CAN)
Natalia Kadyrova (RUS)

===== Final =====
15 May 2011
14:00

Belgium	2 – 1	Italy
Coppey 14'; De Vos 43'	Report	Padalino 64'

Umpires:
Jean Duncan (SCO)
Hannah Sanders (ENG)

== Awards ==
Best Player	Best Goalkeeper	Topscorer	Fair Play Trophy
(Belgium) Charlotte De Vos	(Italy) Roberta Lilliu	(Belarus) Yuliya Mikheichyk	Austria

== Statistics ==
=== Final ranking ===
1. Belgium
2. Italy
3. Belarus
4. Chile
5. Russia
6. Malaysia
7. Canada
8. Austria
