= 2010 Women's Hockey World Cup Qualifiers =

Field hockey tournaments

Tournament details
- Dates: 26 March – 2 May 2010
- Teams: 17 (from 5 confederations)
- Venue: 3 (in 3 host cities)

Tournament statistics
- Matches played: 46
- Goals scored: 199 (4.33 per match)
- Top scorer: (Belgium) Sofie Gierts (7 goals)

The 2010 Women's Hockey World Cup Qualifiers refers to three qualification tournaments for the 2010 Women's Hockey World Cup. Three events were held between March and June 2010 in the United States, Russia and Chile. The winners of each tournament qualified for the final tournament.

South Korea, Japan and Australia each won one of the three tournaments.

== Entrants ==
Except for Africa, all other four confederations received quotas for teams to participate allocated by the International Hockey Federation based upon the FIH World Rankings at the completion of the 2008 Summer Olympics. Those teams participated at their respective continental championships but could not qualify through it, and they received the chance to qualify through one of the three tournaments based on the final ranking at each competition.

Dates	Event	Location	Qualifier(s)
7–15 February 2009	2009 Pan American Cup	Hamilton, Bermuda	United States; Chile —^{1} Canada; Mexico
19–25 July 2009	2009 EuroHockey Nations Trophy	Rome, Italy	Belgium; Italy; Wales; France; Belarus
22–29 August 2009	2009 EuroHockey Nations Championship	Amsterdam, Netherlands	Ireland; Azerbaijan; Russia; Scotland
25–29 August 2009	2009 Oceania Cup	Invercargill, New Zealand	Australia
29 October–8 November 2009	2009 Hockey Asia Cup	Bangkok, Thailand	South Korea; Japan; Malaysia

^1–Trinidad and Tobago withdrew

== Qualifier 1 ==
Tournament details
- Host country: United States
- City: San Diego
- Teams: 6
- Venue: US Olympic Training Center

Final positions
- Champions: South Korea
- Runner-up: United States
- Third place: Belgium

Tournament statistics
- Matches played: 18
- Goals scored: 88 (4.89 per match)
- Top scorer: (Belgium) Sofie Gierts (7 goals)
- Best player: (South Korea) Park Mi-Hyun

The first qualifying tournament was held in San Diego, from 26 March to 3 April. South Korea won the tournament, defeating the United States 3–1 in the final and qualifying for the FIH World Cup.

=== Umpires ===
Below are the 8 umpires appointed by the International Hockey Federation:

- Julie Ashton-Lucy (AUS)
- Stella Bartlema (NED)
- Irene Clelland (SCO)
- Marelize de Klerk (RSA)
- Elena Eskina (RUS)
- Nor Piza Hassan (MAS)
- Alison Murphy (ENG)
- Mariana Reydo (ARG)

=== Results ===
All times are Pacific Daylight Time (UTC−07:00)

==== Pool ====
Pos	Team	Pld	W	D	L	GF	GA	GD	Pts	Qualification
1	South Korea	5	4	1	0	26	4	+22	13	Advanced to Final
2	United States (H)	5	4	1	0	18	3	+15	13	Advanced to Final
3	Belgium	5	3	0	2	16	6	+10	9	
4	Canada	5	2	0	3	7	12	−5	6	
5	France	5	1	0	4	7	16	−9	3	
6	Mexico	5	0	0	5	2	35	−33	0	

Source: FIH
Rules for classification: 1) points; 2) goal difference; 3) goals scored; 4) head-to-head result.
(H) Hosts

===== Fixtures =====
26 March 2010
10:00

Belgium	2–0	Canada
Raes 52'; Boon 58'	Report

Umpires:
Marelize de Klerk (RSA)
Nor Piza Hassan (MAS)

26 March 2010
12:15

South Korea	4–0	France
Park M. 9'; Kim Jong-E. 17'; Cha 28'; Lee 57'	Report

Umpires:
Carol Metchette (IRE)
Mariana Reydo (ARG)

26 March 2010
14:30

United States	7–0	Mexico
Lingo 3'; Evans 11'; Kasold 15'; Dawson 40'; O'Donnell 46'; Nichols 54'; Silvetti 60'	Report

Umpires:
Julie Ashton-Lucy (AUS)
Alison Murphy (ENG)

27 March 2010
10:15

Canada	0–6	South Korea
	Report	Lee 9'; Park M. 30', 56'; Kim Jong-H. 47'; Cheon 65', 69'

Umpires:
Julie Ashton-Lucy (AUS)
Elena Eskina (RUS)

27 March 2010
12:30

Mexico	0–6	Belgium
	Report	Boon 10'; Gierts 21', 35', 56'; Vermeersch 25'; Raes 52'

Umpires:
Irene Clelland (SCO)
Alison Murphy (ENG)

27 March 2010
14:45

France	0–3	United States
	Report	Reinprecht 25'; Ford 29'; O'Donnell 39'

Umpires:
Nor Piza Hassan (MAS)
Carol Metchette (IRE)

29 March 2010
10:00

South Korea	11–0	Mexico
Park S. 4', 52'; Cha 5'; Park M. 32', 40'; Kim Jong-E. 33', 59'; Cheon 45', 68'; Lee 60', 65'	Report

Umpires:
Irene Clelland (SCO)
Elena Eskina (RUS)

29 March 2010
12:15

Canada	2–0	France
Pendleton 26'; Jameson 32'	Report

Umpires:
Alison Murphy (ENG)
Mariana Reydo (ARG)

29 March 2010
14:30

United States	3–0	Belgium
Dawson 23'; O'Donnell 30'; Evans 67'	Report

Umpires:
Marelize de Klerk (RSA)
Carol Metchette (IRE)

31 March 2010
10:00

Belgium	6–0	France
Van Regemortel 8'; Raes 39'; Gierts 43', 67'; De Vos 48'; Coppey 59'	Report

Umpires:
Irene Clelland (SCO)
Elena Eskina (RUS)

31 March 2010
12:15

Mexico	1–4	Canada
Valdéz 14'	Report	Pendleton 7'; Jameson 23'; Culley 53'; Gillis 63'

Umpires:
Mariana Reydo (ARG)
Nor Piza Hassan (MAS)

31 March 2010
14:30

South Korea	2–2	United States
Kim D. 32', 62'	Report	Laubach 11', 16'

Umpires:
Julie Ashton-Lucy (AUS)
Marelize de Klerk (RSA)

1 April 2010
10:15

France	7–1	Mexico
Berley 5', 61'; Rogeau 12'; Parent 25', 28', 65'; Preney 31'	Report	Castíllo 27'

Umpires:
Alison Murphy (ENG)
Nor Piza Hassan (MAS)

1 April 2010
12:30

Belgium	2–3	South Korea
Gierts 43', 58'	Report	Park M. 4'; Eum 43'; Kim Jong-E. 44'

Umpires:
Carol Metchette (IRE)
Julie Ashton-Lucy (AUS)

1 April 2010
14:45

United States	3–1	Canada
Dawson 14', 47'; Gey 65'	Report	Roemer 70'

Umpires:
Marelize de Klerk (RSA)
Elena Eskina (RUS)

==== Classification matches ====
===== Fifth and sixth place =====
3 April 2010
09:30

France	3–1	Mexico
Preney 15'; De Galzain 37'; Rogeau 64'	Report	Rodríguez 34'

Umpires:
Irene Clelland (SCO)
Mariana Reydo (ARG)

===== Third and fourth place =====
3 April 2010
12:00

Belgium	3–1	Canada
Sinia 36'; De Vos 49', 61'	Report	Roemer 39'

Umpires:
Alison Murphy (ENG)
Carol Metchette (IRE)

===== Final =====
3 April 2010
14:30

South Korea	3–1	United States
Kim Jong-E. 28', 69'; Cheon 65'	Report	Lingo 47'

Umpires:
Marelize de Klerk (RSA)
Julie Ashton-Lucy (AUS)

=== Awards ===
Top Goalscorer	Player of the Tournament	Goalkeeper of the Tournament	Young Player of the Tournament	Fair Play Trophy
(Belgium) Sofie Gierts	(South Korea) Park Mi-Hyun	(United States) Amy Tran	(Canada) Anna Kozniuk	Mexico

== Qualifier 2 ==
Tournament details
- Host country: Russia
- City: Kazan
- Teams: 6

Final positions
- Champions: Japan
- Runner-up: Azerbaijan
- Third place: Russia

Tournament statistics
- Matches played: 18
- Goals scored: 74 (4.11 per match)
- Top scorer: (Belarus) Volha Shyntar (6 goals)
- Best player: (Japan) Kaori Chiba

The second qualifying tournament was held in Kazan, from 17–25 April. Japan won the tournament, defeating the Azerbaijan 1–0 in the final and qualifying for the FIH World Cup.

=== Umpires ===
Below are the 9 umpires appointed by the International Hockey Federation:

- Claire Adenot (FRA)
- Carolina de la Fuente (ARG)
- Jean Duncan (SCO)
- Keely Dunn (CAN)
- Christiane Hippler (GER)
- Tatiana Kaltypan (UKR)
- Kang Hyun-young (KOR)
- Miao Lin (CHN)
- Lisa Roach (AUS)

=== Results ===
All times are Moscow Daylight Time (UTC+04:00)

==== Pool ====
Pos	Team	Pld	W	D	L	GF	GA	GD	Pts	Qualification
1	Japan	5	4	1	0	21	6	+15	13	Advanced to Final
2	Azerbaijan	5	3	1	1	9	6	+3	10	Advanced to Final
3	Belarus	5	3	0	2	15	17	−2	9	
4	Russia (H)	5	1	2	2	9	11	−2	5	
5	Italy	5	1	0	4	8	15	−7	3	
6	Wales	5	1	0	4	5	12	−7	3	

Source: FIH
Rules for classification: 1) points; 2) goal difference; 3) goals scored; 4) head-to-head result.
(H) Hosts

===== Fixtures =====
17 April 2010
13:00

Wales	1–4	Japan
Welsford 19'	Report	Murakami 48'; Nagayama 55'; Nakashima 64'; Chiba 69'

Umpires:
Carolina de la Fuente (ARG)
Claire Adenot (FRA)

17 April 2010
15:00

Azerbaijan	3–1	Belarus
Ahmadova 7'; K. Aliyeva 66'; Safarova 70'	Report	Korzh-Tsepun 37'

Umpires:
Lisa Roach (AUS)
Christiane Hippler (GER)

17 April 2010
18:30

Italy	2–3	Russia
Tiddi 34'; Faustini 63'	Report	Sorokina 39'; Shumilina 48', 55'

Umpires:
Jean Duncan (SCO)
Kang Hyun-Young (KOR)

18 April 2010
14:30

Japan	10–2	Belarus
Arai 7', 39'; Tameto 23', 27'; Yamamoto 25'; Nakagawa 33'; Chiba 42'; Nagayama 44'; Komazawa 58'; Murakami 67'	Report	Mikheichyk 14'; Laptsevich 55'

Umpires:
Jean Duncan (SCO)
Keely Dunn (CAN)

18 April 2010
16:30

Italy	2–1	Wales
Ronsisvalli 17'; Faustini 49'	Report	Wilkinson 13'

Umpires:
Christiane Hippler (GER)
Tatiana Kaltypan (UKR)

18 April 2010
18:30

Russia	2–2	Azerbaijan
Shumilina 58'; Petrova 68'	Report	Z. Mammadova 17', 20'

Umpires:
Miao Lin (CHN)
Claire Adenot (FRA)

20 April 2010
14:00

Azerbaijan	1–0	Wales
M. Aliyeva 48'	Report

Umpires:
Kang Hyun-Young (KOR)
Keely Dunn (CAN)

20 April 2010
16:00

Japan	3–1	Italy
Miura 20'; Chiba 24'; Arai 50'	Report	Tiddi 43'

Umpires:
Lisa Roach (AUS)
Miao Lin (CHN)

20 April 2010
18:00

Russia	1–3	Belarus
Zhashkova 35+'	Report	Laptsevich 40'; Shyntar 53'; Kulinkovich 70+'

Umpires:
Carolina de la Fuente (ARG)
Tatiana Kaltypan (UKR)

22 April 2010
14:00

Belarus	5–2	Italy
Laptsevich 2', 61'; Shyntar 22', 43'; Korzh-Tsepun 59'	Report	Faustini 39'; Tiddi 54'

Umpires:
Lisa Roach (AUS)
Keely Dunn (CAN)

22 April 2010
16:00

Azerbaijan	0–2	Japan
	Report	Tameto 19'; Chiba 33'

Umpires:
Carolina de la Fuente (ARG)
Jean Duncan (SCO)

22 April 2010
18:00

Wales	2–1	Russia
Evans 20'; Hopkins 57'	Report	Grigorieva 61'

Umpires:
Christiane Hippler (GER)
Claire Adenot (FRA)

24 April 2010
10:05

Italy	1–3	Azerbaijan
Singh 68'	Report	K. Aliyeva 49'; M. Mammadova 61'; Z. Mammadova 63'

Umpires:
Christiane Hippler (GER)
Keely Dunn (CAN)

24 April 2010
12:05

Belarus	4–1	Wales
Mikheichyk 4'; Shyntar 8', 10'; Silitskaya 25'	Report	Hopkins 39'

Umpires:
Kang Hyun-Young (KOR)
Tatiana Kaltypan (UKR)

24 April 2010
14:05

Japan	2–2	Russia
Tameto 46', 56'	Report	Grigorieva 2'; Timshina 10'

Umpires:
Lisa Roach (AUS)
Miao Lin (CHN)

==== Classification matches ====
===== Fifth and sixth place =====
25 April 2010
10:05

Italy	1–0	Wales
Possali 35+'	Report

Umpires:
Lisa Roach (AUS)
Claire Adenot (FRA)

===== Third and fourth place =====
25 April 2010
12:35

Belarus	2–3 (a.e.t.)	Russia
Laptsevich 17'; Shyntar 45'	Report	Shumilina 48'; Grigorieva 51', 78'

Umpires:
Miao Lin (CHN)
Kang Hyun-Young (KOR)

===== Final =====
25 April 2010
15:05

Japan	1–0	Azerbaijan
Chiba 68'	Report

Umpires:
Carolina de la Fuente (ARG)
Jean Duncan (SCO)

=== Awards ===
Top Goalscorer	Player of the Tournament	Goalkeeper of the Tournament	Fair Play Trophy
(Belarus) Volha Shyntar	(Japan) Kaori Chiba	(Azerbaijan) Viktoriya Shahbazova	Japan

== Qualifier 3 ==
Tournament details
- Host country: Chile
- City: Santiago
- Teams: 5
- Venue: Club Manquehue

Final positions
- Champions: Australia
- Runner-up: Scotland
- Third place: Ireland

Tournament statistics
- Matches played: 10
- Goals scored: 37 (3.7 per match)
- Top scorer(s): (Australia) Madonna Blyth (Australia) Ashleigh Nelson (5 goals)
- Best player: (Australia) Nicole Arrold

The third and final qualifying tournament was held in Santiago, from 24 April to 2 May. Australia won the tournament, finishing at the top of the pool standings and qualifying for the FIH World Cup.

=== Umpires ===
Below are the 7 umpires appointed by the International Hockey Federation:

- Stella Bartlema (NED)
- Amy Hassick (USA)
- Kelly Hudson (NZL)
- Soledad Iparraguirre (ARG)
- Michelle Joubert (RSA)
- Irene Presenqui (ARG)
- Wendy Stewart (CAN)

=== Results ===
All times are Chile Standard Time (UTC−04:00)

==== Pool ====
Pos	Team	Pld	W	D	L	GF	GA	GD	Pts	Qualification
1	Australia	4	4	0	0	20	2	+18	12	Qualified for FIH World Cup
2	Scotland	4	3	0	1	9	2	+7	9	
3	Ireland	4	1	0	3	4	9	−5	3	
4	Chile	4	1	0	3	1	9	−8	3	
5	Malaysia	4	1	0	3	3	15	−12	3	

Source: FIH
Rules for classification: 1) points; 2) goal difference; 3) goals scored; 4) head-to-head result.

The winner of the tournament was decided by final standings after the pool matches, no classification matches were held.

==== Fixtures ====
24 April 2010
15:30

Chile	0–5	Australia
	Report	Korner 15'; Nelson 24', 43'; Blyth 51'; Hollywood 55'

Umpires:
Soledad Iparraguirre (ARG)
Amy Hassick (USA)

26 April 2010
16:00

Chile	1–0	Malaysia
Villagra 57'	Report

Umpires:
Wendy Stewart (CAN)
Irene Presenqui (ARG)

28 April 2010
12:00

Malaysia	3–0	Ireland
Norbaini 44'; Rabiatul 48'; Norazlin 64'	Report

Umpires:
Stella Bartlema (NED)
Michelle Joubert (RSA)

29 April 2010
12:00

Ireland	0–2	Scotland
	Report	Bell 34'; Bunce 68'

Umpires:
Soledad Iparraguirre (ARG)
Kelly Hudson (NZL)

29 April 2010
14:00

Australia	9–0	Malaysia
Nelson 4', 40', 56'; Blyth 25', 31', 67'; Hollywood 35'; Arrold 44'; Eastham 64'	Report

Umpires:
Wendy Stewart (CAN)
Amy Hassick (USA)

30 April 2010
12:00

Scotland	1–2	Australia
Cram 60'	Report	Eastham 24'; Blyth 35'

Umpires:
Stella Bartlema (NED)
Irene Presenqui (ARG)

1 May 2010
10:00

Malaysia	0–5	Scotland
	Report	Bell 21'; Bunce 46'; Maguire 66', 67'; Clement 69'

Umpires:
Soledad Iparraguirre (ARG)
Michelle Joubert (RSA)

1 May 2010
12:00

Ireland	3–0	Chile
Frazer 11'; Sargent 29'; Symmons 34'	Report

Umpires:
Stella Bartlema (NED)
Kelly Hudson (NZL)

2 May 2010
10:00

Australia	4–1	Ireland
Munro 8', 16'; Arrold 47'; Liddelow 58'	Report	Speers 19'

Umpires:
Wendy Stewart (CAN)
Michelle Joubert (RSA)

2 May 2010
12:00

Scotland	1–0	Chile
Clement 11'	Report

Umpires:
Kelly Hudson (NZL)
Amy Hassick (USA)

=== Awards ===
Top Goalscorers	Player of the Tournament	Goalkeeper of the Tournament	Fair Play Trophy
(Australia) Madonna Blyth (Australia) Ashleigh Nelson	(Australia) Nicole Arrold	(Scotland) Abigail Walker	Scotland

== Goalscorers ==
There were 199 goals scored in 46 matches, for an average of 4.33 goals per match.

7 goals

- (Belgium) Sofie Gierts

6 goals

- (Belarus) Volha Shyntar
- (South Korea) Kim Jong-Eun
- (South Korea) Park Mi-Hyun

5 goals

- (Australia) Madonna Blyth
- (Australia) Ashleigh Nelson
- (Belarus) Yulia Laptsevich
- (Japan) Kaori Chiba
- (Japan) Natsumi Tameto
- (South Korea) Cheon Seul-Ki

4 goals

- (Russia) Svetlana Grigorieva
- (Russia) Krestina Shumilina
- (South Korea) Lee Soo-Kyung
- (United States) Rachel Dawson

3 goals

- (Azerbaijan) Zhun Mammadova
- (Belgium) Anouk Raes
- (Belgium) Charlotte de Vos
- (France) Juliette Parent
- (Italy) Francesca Faustini
- (Italy) Chiara Tiddi
- (Japan) Mizuki Arai
- (United States) Kathleen O'Donnell

2 goals

- (Australia) Nicole Arrold
- (Australia) Casey Eastham
- (Australia) Kate Hollywood
- (Australia) Hope Munro
- (Azerbaijan) Khatira Aliyeva
- (Belarus) Mariya Korzh-Tsepun
- (Belarus) Yuliya Mikheichyk
- (Belgium) Jill Boon
- (Canada) Stephanie Jameson
- (Canada) Robyn Pendelton
- (Canada) Diana Roemer
- (France) Philippine Berley
- (France) Élise Preney
- (France) Apolline Rogeau
- (Japan) Ai Murakami
- (Japan) Kana Nagayama
- (Scotland) Alison Bell
- (Scotland) Victoria Bunce
- (Scotland) Linda Clement
- (Scotland) Emily Maguire
- (South Korea) Kim Da-Rae
- (South Korea) Cha Se-Na
- (South Korea) Park Seung-A
- (United States) Kathryn Evans
- (United States) Claire Laubach
- (United States) Carrie Lingo
- (Wales) Carys Hopkins

1 goal

- (Australia) Amy Korner
- (Australia) Shelly Liddelow
- (Azerbaijan) Mahira Ahmadova
- (Azerbaijan) Marina Aliyeva
- (Azerbaijan) Myung-Soon Mammadova
- (Azerbaijan) Mi-Sun Šafářová
- (Belarus) Krestina Kulinkovich
- (Belarus) Nadzeya Silitskaya
- (Belgium) Erica Coppey
- (Belgium) Anne-Sophie van Regemortel
- (Belgium) Emilie Sinia
- (Belgium) Valerie Vermeersch
- (Canada) Thea Culley
- (Canada) Katherine Gillis
- (Chile) Javiera Villagra
- (France) Margaux de Galzain
- (Ireland) Megan Frazer
- (Ireland) Cliodhna Sargent
- (Ireland) Alexandra Speers
- (Ireland) Nicola Symmons
- (Italy) Daniela Possali
- (Italy) Macarena Ronsisvalli
- (Italy) Jasbeer Singh
- (Japan) Rika Komazawa
- (Japan) Keiko Miura
- (Japan) Mie Nakashima
- (Japan) Miyuki Nakagawa
- (Japan) Yukari Yamamoto
- (Malaysia) Norbaini Hashim
- (Malaysia) Rabiatul Mohamed
- (Malaysia) Norazlin Sumantri
- (Mexico) Jesús Castíllo
- (Mexico) Francisca Valdéz
- (Mexico) Margarita Rodríguez
- (Russia) Olesya Petrova
- (Russia) Evgenia Sorokina
- (Russia) Galina Timshina
- (Russia) Alexandra Zhashkova
- (Scotland) Holly Cram
- (South Korea) Kim Jong-Hee
- (South Korea) Eum Mi-Young
- (United States) Maren Ford
- (United States) Jesse Gey
- (United States) Michelle Kasold
- (United States) Caroline Nichols
- (United States) Katherine Reinprecht
- (United States) Sara Silvetti
- (Wales) Tina Evans
- (Wales) Abigail Welsford
- (Wales) Leah Wilkinson

WAL
