= 2011 Women's EuroHockey Championship =

International field hockey competition

2011 Women's EuroHockey Nations Championship
Tournament details
- Host country: Germany
- City: Mönchengladbach
- Teams: 8
- Venue: Warsteiner HockeyPark

Final positions
- Champions: Netherlands (8th title)
- Runner-up: Germany
- Third place: England

Tournament statistics
- Matches played: 20
- Goals scored: 78 (3.9 per match)
- Top scorer: (Netherlands) Maartje Paumen (5 goals)
- Best player: (Germany) Natascha Keller

The 2011 Women's EuroHockey Nations Championship was the 10th edition of the women's field hockey championship organized by the European Hockey Federation. It was held from 20 August to 27 August 2011 in Mönchengladbach, Germany.

This tournament was also a qualifier for the 2012 Olympics, with both finalists earning a spot. In the event that England played in the final, the third placed team would have qualified instead, as England cannot qualify as a nation for the olympics (being part of Great Britain).

The Netherlands won the title for the eighth time after defeating Germany 3–0 in the final.

== Results ==
All times are Central European Summer Time (UTC+2)

=== Pool A ===
Pos	Team	Pld	W	D	L	GF	GA	GD	Pts	Qualification
1	Spain	3	3	0	0	7	1	+6	9	Semi-finals
2	Netherlands	3	2	0	1	13	2	+11	6	Semi-finals
3	Azerbaijan	3	1	0	2	6	13	−7	3	
4	Italy	3	0	0	3	4	14	−10	0	

Source: EuroHockey
Rules for classification: 1) points; 2) goal difference; 3) goals scored; 4) head-to-head result.

20 August 2011
10:00

Spain	4–0	Italy
Bonastre 5'; Malda 32', 58'; Muñoz 57'	Report

Umpires:
Julie Ashton-Lucy (AUS)
Michelle Meister (GER)

20 August 2011
12:00

Netherlands	8–0	Azerbaijan
Paumen 3', 32', 53'; Bos 20'; Lammers 22', 23', 58'; Hoog 51'	Report

Umpires:
Soledad Iparraguirre (ARG)
Valentina Tomasi (ITA)

21 August 2011
12:00

Azerbaijan	5–3	Italy
Suleymanova 23'; Z. Mammadova 29'; M. Mammadova 35'; Lee 37'; Aliyeva 42'	Report	Padalino 30', 49'; Ronsisvalli 67'

Umpires:
Michelle Meister (GER)
Jean Duncan (SCO)

21 August 2011
18:00

Spain	1–0	Netherlands
Malda 6'	Report

Umpires:
Soledad Iparraguirre (ARG)
Carol Metchette (IRL)

23 August 2011
17:00

Azerbaijan	1–2	Spain
Aliyeva 44'	Report	Sánchez 39'; Flores 66'

Umpires:
Julie Ashton-Lucy (AUS)
Valentina Tomasi (ITA)

23 August 2011
19:00

Netherlands	5–1	Italy
Paumen 21', 55' van As 24'; Lammers 46'; Mol 68'	Report	Titalonga 35'

Umpires:
Jean Duncan (SCO)
Victoria del Olmo (ESP)

=== Pool B ===
Pos	Team	Pld	W	D	L	GF	GA	GD	Pts	Qualification
1	England	3	3	0	0	9	1	+8	9	Semi-finals
2	Germany	3	2	0	1	7	2	+5	6	Semi-finals
3	Belgium	3	1	0	2	3	8	−5	3	
4	Ireland	3	0	0	3	1	9	−8	0	

Source: EuroHockey
Rules for classification: 1) points; 2) goal difference; 3) goals scored; 4) head-to-head result.

20 August 2011
14:00

Germany	3–0	Ireland
Keller 2'; Rinne 23'; Müller 48'	Report

Umpires:
Stella Bartlema (NED)
Victoria del Olmo (ESP)

20 August 2011
18:00

England	4–0	Belgium
Danson 13'; Rogers 18'; Cullen 47'; Walsh 55'	Report

Umpires:
Carol Metchette (IRL)
Elena Eskina (RUS)

21 August 2011
16:00

England	2–0	Germany
Cullen 18', 40'	Report

Umpires:
Julie Ashton-Lucy (AUS)
Elena Eskina (RUS)

21 August 2011
20:00

Ireland	0–3	Belgium
	Report	de Vos 6', 34' van Lindt 45'

Umpires:
Stella Bartlema (NED)
Hannah Sanders (GBR)

23 August 2011
13:00

Ireland	1–3	England
Small 32'	Report	Macleod 40'; Richardson 42'; Panter 54'

Umpires:
Stella Bartlema (NED)
Michelle Meister (GER)

23 August 2011
15:00

Germany	4–0	Belgium
Stöckel 28'; Beermann 45'; Hoffmann 49'; Müller-Wieland 66'	Report

Umpires:
Soledad Iparraguirre (ARG)
Hannah Sanders (GBR)

=== Fifth to eighth place classification ===
The third and fourth place team in each pool competed in a pool to determine the fifth to eighth-place winners. The last two placers will be relegated to EuroHockey Nations Trophy in 2013. Note that the match played against each other in pool A or B counts in the pool C classification.

==== Pool C ====
Pos	Team	Pld	W	D	L	GF	GA	GD	Pts	Relegation
1	Belgium	3	3	0	0	10	1	+9	9	
2	Ireland	3	2	0	1	7	5	+2	6	
3	Azerbaijan	3	1	0	2	7	9	−2	3	Relegated to EuroHockey Nations Championship II
4	Italy	3	0	0	3	4	13	−9	0	Relegated to EuroHockey Nations Championship II

Source: EuroHockey
Rules for classification: 1) points; 2) goal difference; 3) goals scored; 4) head-to-head result.

25 August 2011
14:00

Italy	0–4	Belgium
	Report	Raes 1' van Lindt 7'; Boon 56'; Delmée 69'

Umpires:
Hannah Sanders (GBR)
Carol Metchette (IRL)

25 August 2011
16:00

Azerbaijan	1–3	Ireland
Kim 68'		Harvey 32'; Clarke 58'; Symmons 63'

Umpires:
Victoria del Olmo (ESP)
Valentina Tomasi (ITA)

27 August 2011
08:30

Italy	1–4	Ireland
Padalino 43'		Clarke 17'; Symmons 19'; Connery 20'; McCay 68'

Umpires:
Elena Eskina (RUS)
Hannah Sanders (GBR)

27 August 2011
10:30

Azerbaijan	1–3	Belgium
Shukurzade 70'	Report	de Vos 3'; Nelen 17'; Boon 63'

Umpires:
Michelle Meister (GER)
Jean Duncan (SCO)

=== First to fourth place classification ===
Semifinals
25 August
Netherlands	2
England	0
25 August
Spain	1
Germany	2

Final
27 August
Netherlands	3
Germany	0
Bronze Match
27 August
England	2
Spain	1

==== Semifinals ====
25 August 2011
18:30

Netherlands	2–0	England
van den Heuvel 11'; Lammers 59'	Report

Umpires:
Elena Eskina (RUS)
Julie Ashton-Lucy (AUS)

25 August 2011
21:00

Spain	1–2	Germany
Perez 19'	Report	Hasselmann 11'; Keller 62'

Umpires:
Soledad Iparraguirre (ARG)
Stella Bartlema (NED)

==== Third and fourth place ====
27 August 2011
12:30

England	2–1	Spain
Richardson 51', 68'	Report	Muñoz 47'

Umpires:
Julie Ashton-Lucy (AUS)
Stella Bartlema (NED)

==== Final ====
27 August 2011
15:00

Netherlands	3–0	Germany
Agliotti 8'; Hoog 24'; Welten 69'	Report

Umpires:
Soledad Iparraguirre (ARG)
Carol Metchette (IRL)

== Statistics ==
=== Final standings ===
As per statistical convention in field hockey, matches decided in extra time are counted as wins and losses, while matches decided by penalty shoot-outs are counted as draws.

Pos	Team	Pld	W	D	L	GF	GA	GD	Pts	Final Standings
1st place, gold medalist(s)	Netherlands	5	4	0	1	18	2	+16	12	Gold Medal
2nd place, silver medalist(s)	Germany	5	3	0	2	9	6	+3	9	Silver Medal
3rd place, bronze medalist(s)	England	5	4	0	1	11	4	+7	12	Bronze Medal
4	Spain	5	3	0	2	9	5	+4	9	Fourth place
5	Belgium	5	3	0	2	10	9	+1	9	Eliminated in pool stage
6	Ireland	5	2	0	3	8	11	−3	6	Eliminated in pool stage
7	Azerbaijan	5	1	0	4	8	19	−11	3	Eliminated in pool stage
8	Italy	5	0	0	5	5	22	−17	0	Eliminated in pool stage

Source: EuroHockey

=== Goalscorers ===
There were 78 goals scored in 20 matches, for an average of 3.9 goals per match.

5 goals

- (Netherlands) Maartje Paumen
- (Netherlands) Kim Lammers

3 goals

- (Belgium) Charlotte de Vos
- (England) Crista Cullen
- (England) Helen Richardson
- (Italy) Alessia Padalino
- (Spain) Barbara Malda

2 goals

- (Azerbaijan) Mi-Seon Aliyeva
- (Belgium) Jill Boon
- (Belgium) Lieselotte van Lindt
- (Germany) Natascha Keller
- (Ireland) Emma Clarke
- (Ireland) Nicola Symmons
- (Netherlands) Ellen Hoog
- (Spain) Silvia Muñoz

1 goal

- (Azerbaijan) Hwa Lee
- (Azerbaijan) Myung-soon Mammadova
- (Azerbaijan) Zhun Mammadova
- (Azerbaijan) Hye-Sook Shukurzade
- (Azerbaijan) Zhang Suleymanova
- (Azerbaijan) Kim Yoon-Seon
- (Belgium) Hélène Delmée
- (Belgium) Barbara Nelen
- (Belgium) Anouk Raes
- (England) Alex Danson
- (England) Hannah Macleod
- (England) Anne Panter
- (England) Chloe Rogers
- (England) Kate Walsh
- (Germany) Janine Beermann
- (Germany) Nina Hasselmann
- (Germany) Eileen Hoffmann
- (Germany) Janne Müller-Wieland
- (Germany) Julia Müller
- (Germany) Fanny Rinne
- (Germany) Maike Stöckel
- (Ireland) Aine Connery
- (Ireland) Michelle Harvey
- (Ireland) Shirley McCay
- (Ireland) Niamh Small
- (Italy) Macarena Ronsisvalli
- (Italy) Evelina Titalonga
- (Netherlands) Marilyn Agliotti
- (Netherlands) Willemijn Bos
- (Netherlands) Carlien Dirkse van den Heuvel
- (Netherlands) Sabine Mol
- (Netherlands) Naomi van As
- (Netherlands) Lidewij Welten
- (Spain) Berta Bonastre
- (Spain) Anabel Flores
- (Spain) Beatriz Perez
- (Spain) Pilar Sánchez

Source: EuroHockey
