= Alexandra Speers =

Irish field hockey player (born 1987)

Personal information
- Born: 15 March 1987 (age 39) Banbridge, Northern Ireland
- Height: 165 cm (5 ft 5 in)

Sport
- Sport: Field hockey
- Position: Forward
National team
Years	Team	Caps	Goals
2006–2014	Ireland	164	(–)
Medal record
Women's field hockey
Representing Ireland
FIH Champions Challenge II
Bronze medal – third place	2009 Kazan

Alexandra Speers (born 15 March 1987) is a retired field hockey player from Ireland.

== Personal life ==
Speers was born in Banbridge, Northern Ireland, and grew up in Kilkeel.

== Career ==
She made her international debut for the Green Army in 2006. During a tour to South Africa, she earned her first senior cap during a test match against Scotland in Durban. She represented the team from 2008 to 2014.

During her career, she was a member of the historic Ireland squad that won a bronze medal at 2009 FIH Champions Challenge II in Kazan. This marked Ireland's first ever medal in an international tournament hosted by the International Hockey Federation.

Following the retirement of her teammate and captain, Eimear Cregan, in 2011, Speers succeeded her as captain of the national team. She continued to captain the side until her retirement in 2014.

She announced her retirement from international hockey in 2014 after 164 caps for Ireland.

Major International Tournaments

Throughout her career, Speers competed at the following major tournaments.

- 2006 Intercontinental Cup – Rome
- 2007 EuroHockey Championships – Manchester
- 2008 FIH Olympic Qualifiers – Victoria
- 2009 FIH Champions Challenge II – Kazan
- 2009 EuroHockey Championships – Amsterdam
- 2010 FIH World Cup Qualifiers – Santiago
- 2011 FIH Champions Challenge – Dublin
- 2011 EuroHockey Championships – Mönchengladbach
- 2012 FIH Olympic Qualifiers – Kontich
- 2012 FIH Champions Challenge – Dublin
- 2013 EuroHockey Championships – Boom
