= 2013 Women's EuroHockey Championship =

International field hockey competition

2013 Women's EuroHockey Nations Championship
Tournament details
- Host country: Belgium
- City: Boom
- Dates: 17–24 August
- Teams: 8
- Venue: Braxgata Hockeyclub

Final positions
- Champions: Germany (2nd title)
- Runner-up: England
- Third place: Netherlands

Tournament statistics
- Matches played: 20
- Goals scored: 78 (3.9 per match)
- Top scorer: (Netherlands) Maartje Paumen (5 goals)
- Best player: (Germany) Tina Bachmann

The 2013 Women's EuroHockey Nations Championship was the 11th edition of the women's field hockey championship organised by the European Hockey Federation. It was held from 17 August to 24 August 2013 in Boom, Belgium.

Germany defeated England in the final to win their second title.

== Qualified teams ==
- Belgium
- Belarus
- England
- Germany
- Ireland
- Netherlands
- Scotland
- Spain

== Format ==
The eight teams were split into two groups of four teams. The top two teams advanced to the semifinals to determine the winner in a knockout system. The bottom two teams played in a new group against the teams they did not play in the group stage. The last two teams were relegated to the EuroHockey Nations Challenge.

== Results ==
The match schedule was released on 24 January 2013.

All times are local (UTC+2).

=== Preliminary round ===
==== Pool A ====
Pos	Team	Pld	W	D	L	GF	GA	GD	Pts	Qualification
1	Netherlands	3	3	0	0	15	0	+15	9	Semi-finals
2	Belgium	3	2	0	1	8	3	+5	6	Semi-finals
3	Ireland	3	1	0	2	3	11	−8	3	
4	Belarus	0	0	0	0	3	15	−12	0	

Source: FIH
Rules for classification: 1) points; 2) goal difference; 3) goals scored; 4) head-to-head result.

17 August 2013
14:00

Belgium	5–1	Belarus
de Groof 32'; Boon 37'; Coppey 41'; Versavel 42' de Vos 47'	Report	Kulinkovich 67'

Umpires:
Claire Brunekreef (NED)
Asling Keogh (IRL)

17 August 2013
18:00

Netherlands	6–0	Ireland
Paumen 27', 58'; Hoog 52', 65' van Male 59'; Dirkse van den Heuvel 62'	Report

Umpires:
Irene Clelland (SCO)
Liudmila Aleinikoviene (BLR)

18 August 2013
16:00

Ireland	3–2	Belarus
Speers 12', 50'; Jacob 62'	Report	Shyntar 45'; Syrayezhka 67'

Umpires:
Christiane Hippler (GER)
Claire Adenot (FRA)

18 August 2013
20:00

Belgium	0–2	Netherlands
	Report	Dirkse van den Heuvel 10'; Drost 11'

Umpires:
Elena Eskina (RUS)
Dino Willox (WAL)

20 August 2013
18:00

Ireland	0–3	Belgium
	Report	Raes 22' de Scheemaeckere 57'; Coppey 62'

Umpires:
Dino Willox (WAL)
Irene Clelland (SCO)

20 August 2013
20:00

Netherlands	7–0	Belarus
Lammers 18', 44'; Paumen 27', 53', 58'; Mol 37'; Drost 40'	Report

Umpires:
Elena Eskina (RUS)
Aisling Keogh (IRL)

==== Pool B ====
Pos	Team	Pld	W	D	L	GF	GA	GD	Pts	Qualification
1	Germany	3	3	0	0	5	1	+4	9	Semi-finals
2	England	3	2	0	1	6	3	+3	6	Semi-finals
3	Spain	3	1	0	2	2	6	−4	3	
4	Scotland	3	0	0	3	2	5	−3	0	

Source: FIH
Rules for classification: 1) points; 2) goal difference; 3) goals scored; 4) head-to-head result.

17 August 2013
10:00

England	3–0	Spain
Macleod 4'; Walsh 18'; Owsley 42'	Report

Umpires:
Claire Adenot (FRA)
Christiane Hippler (GER)

17 August 2013
12:00

Germany	1–0	Scotland
20'	Report

Umpires:
Elena Eskina (RUS)
Dino Willox (WAL)

18 August 2013
12:00

Spain	2–1	Scotland
Gómez 1', 26'	Report	Kidd 26'

Umpires:
Caroline Brunekreef (NED)
Liudmila Aleinikoviene (BLR)

18 August 2013
14:00

Germany	2–1	England
Mävers 29', 51'	Report	Ansley 35'

Umpires:
Irene Clelland (SCO)
Laurine Delforge (BEL)

20 August 2013
14:00

England	2–1	Scotland
Macleod 34'; Quek 53'	Report	Kidd 49'

Umpires:
Christiane Hippler (GER)
Caroline Brunekreef (NED)

20 August 2013
16:00

Spain	0–2	Germany
	Report	Hoffmann 66'; Haase 70'

Umpires:
Claire Adenot (FRA)
Laurine Delforge (BEL)

=== Fifth to eighth place classification ===
==== Pool C ====
Pos	Team	Pld	W	D	L	GF	GA	GD	Pts	Relegation
1	Spain	3	3	0	0	7	3	+4	9	
2	Scotland	3	2	0	1	7	5	+2	6	
3	Ireland	3	1	0	2	4	6	−2	3	Relegated to EuroHockey Nations Championship II
4	Belarus	3	0	0	3	6	10	−4	0	Relegated to EuroHockey Nations Championship II

Source: FIH
Rules for classification: 1) points; 2) goal difference; 3) goals scored; 4) head-to-head result.

22 August 2013
14:00

Belarus	2–3	Scotland
Shyntar 43'; Mikheichyk 55'	Report	Skrastin 22'; Howie 26'; Bunce 33'

Umpires:
Christine Hippler (GER)
Laurine Delforge (BEL)

22 August 2013
16:00

Ireland	0–1	Spain
	Report	Bonastre 19'

Umpires:
Dino Willox (WAL)
Luidmila Aleinikoviene (BLR)

24 August 2013
09:00

Ireland	1–3	Scotland
O'Flanagan 21'	Report	Ralph 26'; Kidd 29'; Cram 50'

Umpires:
Laurine Delforge (BEL)
Caroline Brunekreef (NED)

24 August 2013
11:00

Spain	4–2	Belarus
Pérez 15'; Comerma 33'; Ybarra 37'; Bonastre FG'	Report	Batura 53'; Shyntar 58'

Umpires:
Christine Hippler (GER)
AIsling Keogh (IRL)

=== First to fourth place classification ===
Semi-finals
22 August
Germany (p.s.o.)	2 (2)
Belgium	2 (0)
22 August
England (p.s.o.)	1 (3)
Netherlands	1 (2)

Final
24 August
Germany (p.s.o.)	4 (2)
England	4 (0)
Third place
24 August
Belgium	1
Netherlands	3

==== Semifinals ====
22 August 2013
18:00

Germany	2–2	Belgium
Hoffmann 19'; Mävers 68'	Report	Boon 29' de Vos 40'
Penalties
Stöckel (penalty shoot-out scored); Müller (penalty shoot-out scored); Mävers (penalty shoot-out missed)	2–0	(penalty shoot-out missed) de Scheemaeckere; (penalty shoot-out missed) Nelen; (penalty shoot-out missed) de Vos; (penalty shoot-out missed) Raes

Umpires:
Caroline Brunekreef (NED)
Claire Adenot (FRA)

22 August 2013
20:30

Netherlands	1–1	England
de Goede 52'	Report	Unsworth 40'
Penalties
de Goede (penalty shoot-out missed); Paumen (penalty shoot-out missed); Hoog (penalty shoot-out missed); Drost (penalty shoot-out scored); Bos (penalty shoot-out scored) de Goede (penalty shoot-out missed); Drost (penalty shoot-out missed)	2–3	(penalty shoot-out missed) Walsh; (penalty shoot-out scored) Danson; (penalty shoot-out missed) Unsworth; (penalty shoot-out missed) Twigg; (penalty shoot-out scored) Richardson; (penalty shoot-out missed) Richardson; (penalty shoot-out scored) Danson

Umpires:
Elena Eskina (RUS)
Irene Clelland (SCO)

==== Third and fourth place ====
24 August 2013
13:30

Belgium	1–3	Netherlands
de Vos 53'	Report	van Maasakker 10'; Dirkse van den Heuvel 30'; Hoog 68'

Umpires:
Dino Willox (WAL)
Claire Adenot (FRA)

==== Final ====
24 August 2013
16:00

Germany	4–4	England
Hoffmann 4'; Bachmann 15', 22'; Krüger 34'	Report	Twigg 3'; Walsh 8'; Richardson 30'; Gilbert 66'
Penalties
Stöckel (penalty shoot-out scored); Müller (penalty shoot-out missed); Teschke (penalty shoot-out scored); Müller-Wieland (penalty shoot-out missed)	2–0	(penalty shoot-out missed) Walsh; (penalty shoot-out missed) Danson; (penalty shoot-out missed) Unsworth; (penalty shoot-out missed) Twigg

Umpires:
Elena Eskina (RUS)
Irene Clelland (SCO)

== Awards ==
Player of the Tournament	Top Goalscorer	Goalkeeper of the Tournament
(Germany) Tina Bachmann	(Netherlands) Maartje Paumen	(England) Maddie Hinch

== Statistics ==
=== Final standings ===
As per statistical convention in field hockey, matches decided in extra time are counted as wins and losses, while matches decided by penalty shoot-outs are counted as draws.

Pos	Team	Pld	W	D	L	GF	GA	GD	Pts	Final Standings
1st place, gold medalist(s)	Germany	5	3	2	0	11	7	+4	11	Gold Medal
2nd place, silver medalist(s)	England	5	2	2	1	11	8	+3	8	Silver Medal
3rd place, bronze medalist(s)	Netherlands	5	4	1	0	19	2	+17	13	Bronze Medal
4	Belgium	5	2	1	2	11	8	+3	7	Fourth place
5	Spain	5	3	0	2	7	8	−1	9	Eliminated in pool stage
6	Scotland	5	2	0	3	8	8	0	6	Eliminated in pool stage
7	Ireland	5	1	0	4	4	15	−11	3	Eliminated in pool stage
8	Belarus	5	0	0	5	7	22	−15	0	Eliminated in pool stage

Source: FIH

=== Goalscorers ===
There were 78 goals scored in 20 matches, for an average of 3.9 goals per match.

5 goals

- (Netherlands) Maartje Paumen

3 goals

- (Belarus) Volha Shyntar
- (Belgium) Charlotte de Vos
- (Germany) Eileen Hoffmann
- (Germany) Marie Mävers
- (Netherlands) Carlien Dirkse van den Heuvel
- (Netherlands) Ellen Hoog
- (Scotland) Nikki Kidd

2 goals

- (Belgium) Jill Boon
- (Belgium) Erica Coppey
- (England) Hannah Macleod
- (England) Kate Walsh
- (Germany) Tina Bachmann
- (Ireland) Alexandra Speers
- (Netherlands) Roos Drost
- (Netherlands) Kim Lammers
- (Scotland) Holly Cram
- (Spain) María Gómez
- (Spain) Berta Bonastre

1 goal

- (Belarus) Ryta Batura
- (Belarus) Krestina Kulinkovich
- (Belarus) Yuliya Mikheichyk
- (Belarus) Nastatssia Syrayezhka
- (Belgium) Stephanie de Groof
- (Belgium) Anne-Sophie de Scheemaeckere
- (Belgium) Anouk Raes
- (Belgium) Louise Versavel
- (England) Giselle Ansley
- (England) Susie Gilbert
- (England) Lily Owsley
- (England) Sam Quek
- (England) Helen Richardson
- (England) Georgie Twigg
- (England) Laura Unsworth
- (Germany) Lydia Haase
- (Germany) Hannah Krüger
- (Ireland) Lisa Jacob
- (Ireland) Anna O'Flanagan
- (Netherlands) Eva de Goede
- (Netherlands) Sabine Mol
- (Netherlands) Caia van Maasakker
- (Netherlands) Kitty van Male
- (Scotland) Vikki Bunce
- (Scotland) Alison Howie
- (Scotland) Nicola Skrastin
- (Spain) Gloria Comerma
- (Spain) Beatriz Pérez
- (Spain) Rocío Ybarra

1 own goal

- Scotland (against Germany)

Source: FIH
