= Bridget McKeever =

Ireland women's hockey international

Personal information
- Full name: Bridget McKeever Cleland
- Born: 2 February 1983 (age 43) Ballymoney, County Antrim, Northern Ireland

Sport
- Sport: Field hockey
- Position: Midfielder/Defender
Youth career
- Team
- –: Dalriada School
Senior career
Years	Team	Caps	Goals
200x–	Ballymoney	-	-
National team
Years	Team	Caps	Goals
2003–2010	Ireland	150	-
Coaching career
- 200x–: Ballymoney
- 2006–: Dalriada School

Bridget McKeever (born 2 February 1983), also known as Bridget Cleland, is a former Ireland women's field hockey international. Between 2003 and 2010 she made 150 senior appearances for Ireland. She also captained Ireland.

== Early years and education ==
McKeever was educated at Dalriada School and Stranmillis University College.

== Domestic teams ==
=== Ballymoney ===
McKeever played senior club field hockey for Ballymoney, playing in various competitions including the Ulster Shield, the Irish Senior Cup and the Women's Irish Hockey League. Her teammates at Ballymoney have included Angela Platt, Megan Frazer and Katie Mullan. McKeever played for Ballymoney during 2016–17 Women's Irish Hockey League season.

== Ireland international ==
McKeever was first called up for a senior Ireland squad in June 2003 and in July 2003 she made her full debut against Japan. Between 2003 and 2010 she made 150 senior appearances for Ireland. In February 2008 McKeever captained Ireland as she made her 100th senior appearance against China. She also captained Ireland when she made her final appearance against Australia in July 2010.

Tournaments	Place
2003 Women's EuroHockey Nations Championship	6th
2004 Women's Field Hockey Olympic Qualifier	8th
2005 Women's EuroHockey Nations Championship	5th
2006 Women's Intercontinental Cup	8th
2007 Women's EuroHockey Nations Championship	6th
2008 Women's Field Hockey Olympic Qualifier	3rd
2009 Women's Hockey Champions Challenge II	3rd
2009 Women's EuroHockey Nations Championship	5th
2010 Women's Hockey World Cup Qualifiers	3rd

== Teacher and coach ==
In 2006 McKeever began working as a PE teacher at Dalriada School. She also coached at Ballymoney. McKeever mentored Katie Mullan at both Dalriada and Ballymoney.

== Honours ==
Ballymoney

- Irish Senior Cup
  - Winners: 2000–01
  - Runners-up: 2004–05, 2007–08
- Ulster Shield
  - Winners: 2010–11, 2012–13
  - Runners-up: 2001–02, 2004–05, 2005–06, 2007–08
