= Hockey at the 2006 Commonwealth Games – Women's team squads =

This article lists the squads for the Women's hockey at the 2006 Commonwealth Games in Melbourne, Australia.

== Squads ==
=== Australia ===
(1.) Toni Cronk, (2.) Suzie Faulkner, (3.) Karen Smith, (7.) Kim Walker, (9.) Rebecca Sanders, (10.) Kate Hollywood, (11.) Emily Halliday, (12.) Madonna Blyth, (13.) Wendy Beattie, (14.) Nicole Arrold, (15.) Kobie McGurk, (17.) Rachel Imison, (24.) Angie Skirving, (25.) Melanie Twitt, (30.) Sarah Taylor, and (32.) Nikki Hudson. Head coach: Frank Murray.

=== Barbados ===
(1.) Lana Als, (2.) Ann-Marie Alleyne, (3.) Dionne Clarke, (4.) Joana Davis, (5.) Chiaka Drakes, (6.) Deborah-Ann Holder, (7.) Maria Browne, (8.) Reyna Farnum, (9.) Tricia-Ann Greaves, (10.) Patrina Braithwaite, (11.) Allison Haynes, (12.) Cher King, (13.) Lisa Crichlow, (14.) Charlia Warner, (15.) Nicole Tempro, and (16.) Tara Howard. Head coach: Elius Fanus.

=== Canada ===
(3.) Megan Anderson, (4.) Johanna Bischof, (5.) Deb Cuthbert, (9.) Lauren MacLean, (11.) Sarah Forbes, (12.) Kelly Rezansoff, (13.) Stephanie Hume, (14.) Robin Leslie-Spencer, (15.) Stephanie Jameson, (18.) Kim Baker, (19.) Andrea Rushton, (21.) Ali Johnstone, (22.) Tiffany Michaluk, (23.) Katie Rushton, (27.) Clare Linton, and (32.) Azelia Liu. Head coach: Sally Bell.

=== England ===
(1.) Carolyn Reid, (2.) Beth Storry, (3.) Lisa Wooding, (5.) Crista Cullen, (6.) Melanie Clewlow, (7.) Helen Grant, (8.) Helen Richardson, (10.) Lucilla Wright, (11.) Kate Walsh, (13.) Jennie Bimson, (15.) Alex Danson, (20.) Joanne Ellis, (22.) Cathy Gilliat-Smith, (25.) Charlotte Hartley, (26.) Rebecca Herbert, and (27.) Chloe Rogers. Head coach: Danny Kerry.

=== India ===
(1.) Helen Mary, (2.) Kanti Baa, (3.) Nilima Kujur, (4.) Rajwinder Kaur, (5.) Sumrai Tete, (6.) Masira Surin, (7.) Subhadra Pradhan, (8.) Asunta Lakra, (9.) Jyoti Sunita Kullu, (10.) Mamta Kharab, (11.) Jasjeet Kaur Handa, (12.) Surinder Kaur, (13.) Saba Anjum Karim, (14.) Sanggai Chanu, (15.) Sarita Lakra, and (16.) Rajni Bala. Head coach: Maharaj Krishan Kaushik.

=== Malaysia ===
(1.) Mizan Fauziah, (3.) Ahmad Intan, (4.) Kari Sebah Anak, (5.) Ali Noor Hasliza, (7.) Siti Ruhani, (8.) Mohamad Din Juliana, (9.) Hashim Norfaraha, (10.) Othman Siti Rahmah, (12.) Arumugam Chitra Devi, (13.) Arumugam Kannagi, (14.) Abdul Rahman Nadia, (15.) Hashim Norbaini, (16.) Mahmud Ernawati, (17.) Lambor Catherine, (18.) Ismail Siti Sarah, and (22.) Rahmat Nurulshahizan. Head coach: Rethinam Chidambaram Raja.

=== Nigeria ===
(1.) Ladi Rogers, (3.) Helen Obialor, (4.) Christy Bulus, (5.) Queen Anuwa, (6.) Ajuma Ejegwa, (7.) Lucy Micheal Aleji, (8.) Lorinda Sati Yohanna, (9.) Justina Onyedum, (10.) Christy Agbo, (11.) Oluchi Obiefule, (12.) Itohan Evbenafese, (13.) Ijenwa Okah, (14.) Lilian Obasi, (15.) Susan Bulus, (18.) Serah Izang, and (19.) Patricia Uzuebu. Head coach: Christian Kubeinje.

=== New Zealand ===
(1.) Kayla Sharland, (2.) Emily Naylor, (3.) Krystal Forgesson, (9.) Honor Dillon, (10.) Lizzy Igasan, (11.) Stacey Carr, (14.) Suzie Muirhead, (15.) Beth Jurgeleit, (16.) Clarissa Eshuis, (18.) Diana Weavers, (19.) Jane Maley, (20.) Frances Kreft, (25.) Kate Mahon, (26.) Anita Wawatai, (28.) Charlotte Harrison, and (29.) Michelle Hollands. Head coach: Ian Rutledge.

=== Scotland ===
(1.) Debbie McLeod, (2.) Cath Rae, (3.) Vikki Bunce, (4.) Louise Munn, (5.) Catriona Semple, (6.) Julie Kilpatrick, (7.) Jane Burley, (8.) Catriona Forrest, (9.) Samantha Judge, (10.) Rhona Simpson, (11.) Nikki Kidd, (12.) Linda Clement, (13.) Cheryl Valentine, (14.) Emma Rochlin, (15.) Alison Rowatt, and (16.) Louise Carroll. Head coach: Lesley Hobley.

=== South Africa ===
(1.) Caroline Jack, (2.) Mariette Rix, (3.) Kate Hector, (4.) Nita Van Jaarsveldt, (5.) Tarryn Hosking, (6.) Lenise Marals, (7.) Lesle-Ann George, (8.) Marsha Marescia, (9.) Tarryn Bright, (10.) Kathleen Taylor, (11.) Sharne Wehmeyer, (12.) Lindsey Carlisle, (13.) Henna Du Buisson, (14.) Fiona Butler, (15.) Liesel Dorothy, and (16.) Jenny Wilson. Head coach: Jenny King.
