= Sarah Forbes =

Sarah Forbes may refer to:

- Sarah Forbes (cricketer)
- Sarah Forbes (field hockey)
- Sarah Forbes (lacrosse)
- Sarah Forbes Bonetta, ward and goddaughter of Queen Victoria
