= 2011 Women's Hockey Champions Challenge I =

International field hockey tournament

2011 FIH Women's Champions Challenge I
Tournament details
- Host country: Ireland
- City: Dublin
- Teams: 8
- Venue: University College Dublin

Final positions
- Champions: Japan (1st title)
- Runner-up: United States
- Third place: Scotland

Tournament statistics
- Matches played: 24
- Goals scored: 91 (3.79 per match)
- Top scorer: (South Africa) Pietie Coetzee (9 goals)
- Best player: (Scotland) Laura Bartlett
All statistics are correct as of 22 June 2011


The 2011 Women's Hockey Champions Challenge I was the fifth tournament of field hockey championship for women. It was held in Dublin, Ireland from June 18–26, 2011.

== Teams ==
Eight teams participated in the tournament, they were:

- Azerbaijan
- India
- Japan
- Scotland
- South Africa
- Spain
- United States
- Ireland

== Results ==
All times are Irish Standard Time (UTC+01:00)

=== First round ===
==== Pool A ====
Pos	Team	Pld	W	D	L	GF	GA	GD	Pts
1	South Africa	3	1	2	0	12	8	+4	5
2	Scotland	3	1	2	0	6	4	+2	5
3	Japan	3	1	1	1	4	7	−3	4
4	United States	3	0	1	2	7	10	−3	1

Rules for classification: 1) points; 2) goal difference; 3) goals scored; 4) head-to-head result.

18 June 2011
10:00

Japan	2 – 1	United States
Murukami 2'; Komazawa 45'	Report	O'Donnell 9'

Umpires:
Claire Adenot (FRA)
Marelize de Klerk (RSA)

18 June 2011
12:30

South Africa	2 – 2	Scotland
Coetzee 52'; Davids 59'	Report	Baxter 29'; Kidd 35'

Umpires:
Caroline Brunekreef (NED)
Carol Metchette (IRL)

19 June 2011
10:30

United States	1 – 3	Scotland
O'Donnell 9'	Report	Kidd 11'; Judge 36'; Bell 67'

Umpires:
Kang Hyun-Young (KOR)
Carol Metchette (IRL)

19 June 2011
13:00

South Africa	5 – 1	Japan
Russell 2'; Bright 8'; Coetzee 57'; Hubach 61'; Chamberlain 68'	Report	Komazawa 29'

Umpires:
Mariana Reydo (ARG)
Melissa Trivic (AUS)

21 June 2011
11:00

Japan	1 – 1	Scotland
Otsuka 33'	Report	Kidd 13'

Umpires:
Lesley Pieterse (RSA)
Wendy Stewart (CAN)

21 June 2011
13:30

United States	5 – 5	South Africa
Selenski 3', 46'; Laubach 35'; O'Donnell 52', 62'	Report	Coetzee 10', 12', 23', 67'; Marais 39'

Umpires:
Irene Clelland (SCO)
Melissa Trivic (AUS)

==== Pool B ====
Pos	Team	Pld	W	D	L	GF	GA	GD	Pts
1	Ireland	3	2	1	0	5	3	+2	7
2	India	3	1	1	1	8	4	+4	4
3	Azerbaijan	3	1	1	1	4	9	−5	4
4	Spain	3	0	2	1	3	4	−1	2

Rules for classification: 1) points; 2) goal difference; 3) goals scored; 4) head-to-head result.

18 June 2011
15:00

India	1 – 2	Ireland
Handa 59'	Report	Symmons 11'; Watkins 50'

Umpires:
Wendy Stewart (CAN)
Irene Clelland (SCO)

18 June 2011
17:30

Spain	1 – 2	Azerbaijan
Sánchez 55'	Report	Suleymanova 32'; Aliyeva 67'

Umpires:
Melissa Trivic (AUS)
Lesley Pieterse (RSA)

19 June 2011
15:30

Azerbaijan	1 – 2	Ireland
Mammadova 18'	Report	O'Flynn 13'; O'Halloran 21'

Umpires:
Marelize de Klerk (RSA)
Wendy Stewart (CAN)

19 June 2011
18:00

India	1 – 1	Spain
Poonam 69'	Report	Bonastre 64'

Umpires:
Caroline Brunekreef (NED)
Claire Adenot (FRA)

21 June 2011
16:00

Azerbaijan	1 – 6	India
Aliyeva 47'	Report	Anjum 4', 7', 32'; Deepika 10'; Rani 18'; Handa 52'

Umpires:
Kang Hyun-Young (KOR)
Carol Metchette (IRL)

21 June 2011
18:30

Spain	1 – 1	Ireland
Malda 50'	Report	Clarke 52'

Umpires:
Mariana Reydo (ARG)
Marelize de Klerk (RSA)

=== Second round ===
Quarterfinals
23 June 2011
South Africa	2
Spain (a.e.t.)	3
23 June 2011
India	0
Japan	1
23 June 2011
Scotland	3
Azerbaijan	2
23 June 2011
Ireland	1
United States	3

Semi-finals
25 June 2011
Spain	2
Japan (a.e.t.)	3
25 June 2011
Scotland	0
United States	3

Final
26 June 2011
Japan	3
United States	2
Third place match
26 June 2011
Spain	2 (3)
Scotland (p.s.o.)	2 (4)

==== Quarterfinals ====
23 June 2011
10:00

South Africa	2 – 3 (a.e.t.)	Spain
Damons 26'; Coetzee 68'	Report	Huertas 32'; Malda 48'; Sánchez 84'

Umpires:
Wendy Stewart (CAN)
Claire Adenot (FRA)

23 June 2011
12:30

India	0 – 1	Japan
	Report	Mitsuhashi 64'

Umpires:
Caroline Brunekreef (NED)
Marelize de Klerk (RSA)

23 June 2011
15:00

Scotland	3 – 2	Azerbaijan
Wyllie 18'; Cram 42'; Bell 48'	Report	Aliyeva 10'; Jhoi 52'

Umpires:
Kang Hyun-Young (KOR)
Mariana Reydo (ARG)

23 June 2011
17:30

Ireland	1 – 3	United States
O'Flynn 48'	Report	Taylor 14', 20'; Dawson 37'

Umpires:
Lesley Pieterse (RSA)
Irene Clelland (SCO)

==== Fifth to eighth place classification ====
Crossover
24 June 2011
South Africa	2
India	0
24 June 2011
Azerbaijan	0
Ireland	1

Fifth place match
26 June 2011
South Africa	2
Ireland	1
Seventh place match
26 June 2011
India	3
Azerbaijan	1

===== Crossover =====
24 June 2011
15:30

South Africa	2 – 0	India
Coetzee 23'; George 67'	Report

Umpires:
Carol Metchette (IRL)
Melissa Trivic (AUS)

24 June 2011
18:00

Azerbaijan	0 – 1	Ireland
	Report	Sargent 45'

Umpires:
Claire Adenot (FRA)
Irene Clelland (SCO)

===== Seventh and eighth place =====
26 June 2011
09:00

India	3 – 1	Azerbaijan
Anjum 44'; C. Thokchom 49'; A. Thokchom 68'	Report	Suleymanova 28'

Umpires:
Marelize de Klerk (RSA)
Irene Clelland (SCO)

===== Fifth and sixth place =====
26 June 2011
11:30

South Africa	2 – 1	Ireland
Damons 17'; Coetzee 53'	Report	Symmons 47'

Umpires:
Claire Adenot (FRA)
Caroline Brunekreef (NED)

==== First to fourth place classification ====
===== Semifinals =====
25 June 2011
14:00

Spain	2 – 3 (a.e.t.)	Japan
Bonastre 51'; Ybarra 54'	Report	Komazawa 7', 67'; Murukami 78'

Umpires:
Melissa Trivic (AUS)
Lesley Pieterse (RSA)

25 June 2011
16:30

Scotland	0 – 3	United States
	Report	Selenski 44'; Nichols 59'; Gonzalez 68'

Umpires:
Marelize de Klerk (RSA)
Kang Hyun-Young (KOR)

===== Third and fourth place =====
26 June 2011
14:00

Spain	2 – 2	Scotland
Malda 17'; Sánchez 43'	Report	Cram 16'; Kidd 39'
Penalties
Huertas (penalty shoot-out scored); Oliva (penalty shoot-out scored); Malda (penalty shoot-out scored); Ybarra (penalty shoot-out missed); Comerma (penalty shoot-out missed); Huertas (penalty shoot-out missed)	3 – 4	(penalty shoot-out scored) Kidd; (penalty shoot-out missed) Bunce; (penalty shoot-out scored) Bartlett; (penalty shoot-out scored) Clement; (penalty shoot-out missed) Cram; (penalty shoot-out scored) Bartlett

Umpires:
Wendy Stewart (CAN)
Carol Metchette (IRL)

===== Final =====
26 June 2011
16:30

Japan	3 – 2	United States
Shibata 35'; Murukami 42', 64'	Report	Kasold 3'; O'Donnell 26'

Umpires:
Mariana Reydo (ARG)
Kang Hyun-Young (KOR)

== Statistics ==
=== Final ranking ===
1. Japan
2. United States
3. Scotland
4. Spain
5. South Africa
6. Ireland
7. India
8. Azerbaijan
