= Scotland national field hockey team =

Scotland national field hockey team may refer to:

- Scotland men's national field hockey team
- Scotland women's national field hockey team
