= Jenny McDonough =

Ireland women's hockey international

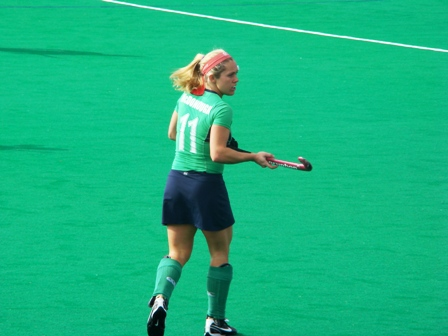
- Jenny McDonough playing for Ireland against South Korea in the 2008 Women's Hockey Olympic Qualifier

Personal information
- Full name: Jenny McDonough McAuley
- Born: 23 April 1981 (age 45) Belfast, Northern Ireland,

Sport
- Sport: Field hockey
- Position: Forward
Youth career
- Years: Team
- 198x–1991: Stranmillis Primary School
- 1991–1999: Methodist College Belfast
Senior career
Years	Team	Caps	Goals
199x–1999	Collegians	-	-
1999–	Belfast Harlequins	-	-
1999–2003	→ Newcastle University	-	-
National team
Years	Team	Caps	Goals
2001–2009	Ireland	117	-

Jenny McDonough (born 23 April 1981), also known as Jenny McAuley, is a former Ireland women's field hockey international. Between 2001 and 2009 she made 117 senior appearances for Ireland. She has also played for Belfast Harlequins in the Women's Irish Hockey League.

== Early years, family and education ==
McDonough was raised in the Malone Road district of Belfast. Both of her parents were dentists. She began playing field hockey at Stranmillis Primary School. Between 1991 and 1999 she attended Methodist College Belfast. Between 1999 and 2003 she attended Newcastle University where she gained a BA in Accountancy and Law. Between 2007 and 2008 McDonough completed a Bachelor of Laws through the Open University.

== Domestic teams ==
=== Early years ===
In her youth McDonough played for Methodist College Belfast and Collegians. She also represented Newcastle University at intervarsity level.

=== Belfast Harlequins ===
McDonough has played for Belfast Harlequins in the Women's Irish Hockey League. In 2015 she announced she was retiring from the first team due to work and family commitments. However she subsequently made a come back at the start of the 2017–18 season. Her teammates at Harlequins have included Zoe Wilson and Lizzie Colvin.

== Ireland international ==
McDonough represented Ireland at Under-16, Under-18 and Under-21 levels before making her senior debut in 2001, aged 19, against England. Between 2001 and 2009 she made 117 senior appearances for Ireland.

Tournaments	Place
2001 Women's Intercontinental Cup	5th
2003 Women's EuroHockey Nations Championship	6th
2004 Women's Field Hockey Olympic Qualifier	8th
2005 Women's EuroHockey Nations Championship	5th
2006 Women's Intercontinental Cup	8th
2007 Women's EuroHockey Nations Championship	6th
2008 Women's Field Hockey Olympic Qualifier	3rd

== Personal ==
=== Employment ===
Between February 2009 and August 2016 McDonough worked as an editor/director of Offshore Investment Magazine. In August 2016 she began working as a development officer at Queen's University Belfast.

=== Family ===
McDonough is married and has two children, Rebecca and Matthew.
