= Julio Solaun =

Spanish field hockey player (1942–2026)

Personal information
- Full name: Julio de Solaun Garteiz-Goxeascoa
- Nationality: Spanish
- Born: 1 February 1942 Getxo, Spain
- Died: 28 March 2026 (aged 84) Getxo, Spain

Sport
- Sport: Field hockey

Julio de Solaun Garteiz-Goxeascoa (1 February 1942 – 28 March 2026) was a Spanish field hockey player. He competed at the 1964 Summer Olympics and the 1968 Summer Olympics. Also known as Javier, his great-niece Rocío Ybarra was captain of the Spain women's national field hockey team in the 2010s, and competed at three Olympics. Solaun died on 28 March 2026, at the age of 84.
