= Dalriada School =

School in Ballymoney, Northern Ireland

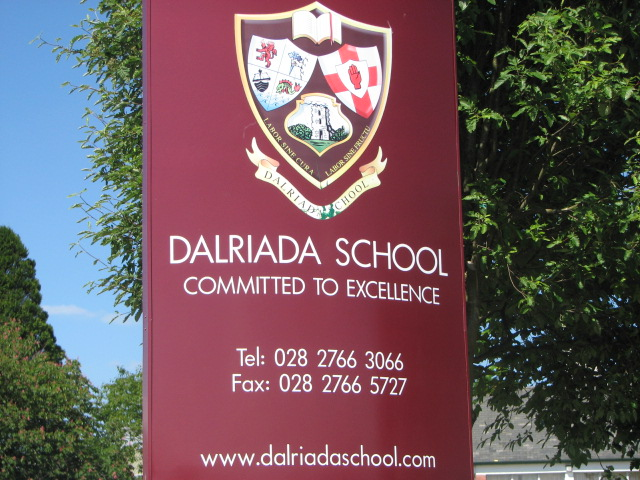
- Dalriada School Sign

Location
- Ballymoney; 55.0727°N 6.5222°W

Information
- Type: Voluntary, Co-educational Grammar School
- Motto: Labor Sine Cura, Labor Sine Fructu (Work Without Effort Is Work Without Fruit)
- Established: 1878
- Principal: Louise Aitcheson
- Deputy Heads: Ian Walker & Louise Crawford
- Enrollment: 1006
- Website: dalriadaschool.com

Dalriada School is a mixed grammar school in Ballymoney in the north of County Antrim in Northern Ireland, named after the Kingdom of Dál Riata. In 2008 the school won The Sunday Times Northern Ireland State Secondary School of the Year award.

== History ==
The schools was established in 1878 as "Ballymoney Intermediate school". The first headmaster was Rev. J.B Armour.

== Extra-curricular activities ==
=== Choirs ===
The school's choirs have won a number of competitions, including the Chamber Choir which won the BBC Ulster School Choir of The Year competition in 2016.

=== Debating ===
In 2010/2011, the debating society entered the UK Wide Debating Matters Championship. A team of six debaters won the Derry Qualifying Heat to make it through the Northern Ireland and Scotland final in Edinburgh, where they triumphed over schools from across the two countries. This allowed them to then qualify for the National Final held at the Royal Society of Medicine where they were defeated in a debate on the Banning of the Burqa.

=== Bar Mock ===
Dalriada also competes in the annual Bar Mock Trial Competition. The team prepares mock legal cases for the regional finals each year in the Royal Courts of Justice in Belfast, winning this competition three times. After winning the National Championships in London in 2016 for the first time, Dalriada pupils went on to compete in the Empire Mock Trial World Championships in New York for the third time. At this event, a Dalriada student received an award for "Outstanding Witness".

=== Sports ===
Dalriada competes in several sports. In 2023, a team representing the school won the All-Ireland volleyball title for a record eighth time.

== Principals ==
No.	Name	Tenure
1	Alfred Ross	1931-1948
2	Edmund Gordon	1948–1975
3	Alan Reynolds	1975–1987
4	William Calvert	1987–2003
5	Derek Boyd	2003–2007
6	Thomas Skelton	2007–2024
7	Louise Aitcheson	2024–present

== Notable alumni ==
- Sir Martyn Lewis; presenter, foreign correspondent and newsreader for BBC News and ITN.
- Gordon Lyons; DUP MLA for East Antrim.
- Bridget McKeever; a former Ireland women's field hockey international. McKeever later became a PE teacher at Dalriada.
- Stewart Moore; an Irish rugby union player, who plays centre for Ulster.
- Katie Mullan; captained Ireland at the 2018 Women's Hockey World Cup when they won the silver medal.
- Angela Platt; a former goalkeeper with both the Ireland women's national field hockey team and the Northern Ireland women's national football team.
