= 2009 Women's Hockey Champions Challenge II =

Tournament details
- Host country: Russia
- City: Kazan
- Dates: 21 – 27 June 2009
- Teams: 8

Final positions
- Champions: India (1st title)
- Runner-up: Belgium
- Third place: Ireland

Tournament statistics
- Matches played: 20
- Goals scored: 85 (4.25 per match)
- Top scorer: (India) Rani Rampal (7 goals)

The 2009 Women's Hockey Champions Challenge II was held from June 21 to June 27, 2009 in Kazan, Russia.

India won the tournament after defeating Belgium 6–3 in the final, gaining qualification to the 2011 Women's Hockey Champions Challenge I.

== Results ==
All times are Moscow Daylight Time (UTC+4)

=== First round ===
==== Pool A ====
Pos	Team	Pld	W	D	L	GF	GA	GD	Pts	Qualification
1	India	3	3	0	0	18	5	+13	9	Advance to Semi–finals
2	Belgium	3	1	1	1	13	8	+5	4	Advance to Semi–finals
3	Belarus	3	1	0	2	5	14	−9	3	
4	Canada	3	0	1	2	4	13	−9	1	

Source: FIH

21 June 2009
08:00

India	5–3	Belgium
Rampal 26'; Anjum 41'; Surinder 42', 61'; Deepika 56'	Report	De Vos 4'; Gierts 7'; Vermeersch 33'

Umpires:
Corrine Cornelius (RSA)
Tatyana Kaltypan (UKR)

21 June 2009
10:00

Belarus	3–1	Canada
Kazachok 2'; Shyntar 32', 50'	Report	Rushton 42'

Umpires:
Elena Eskina (RUS)
Zenia Howe (IRL)

22 June 2009
08:00

Canada	1–8	India
Walkey 10'	Report	Deepika 6'; Surinder 29'; Rani 54', 63', 70+'; Rampal 57', 61'; Kharb 67'

Umpires:
Annie Thomas (MAS)
Tatyana Kaltypan (UKR)

22 June 2009
10:00

Belgium	8–1	Belarus
Meuwese 14', 30', 54', 55'; De Vos 38', 63'; Boon 65'; Gierts 70'	Report	Kulinkovich 11'

Umpires:
Anne McRae (SCO)
Elena Eskina (RUS)

24 June 2009
14:00

India	5–1	Belarus
Surinder 3', 62'; Kharb 16'; Anjum 18', 24'	Report	Shcharbakova 25'

Umpires:
Elena Eskina (RUS)
Tatyana Kaltypan (UKR)

24 June 2009
16:00

Belgium	2–2	Canada
Gierts 52', 58'	Report	Walkey 2'; Roemer 45'

Umpires:
Annie Thomas (MAS)
Zenia Howe (IRL)

==== Pool B ====
Pos	Team	Pld	W	D	L	GF	GA	GD	Pts	Qualification
1	Ireland	3	2	1	0	6	1	+5	7	Advance to Semi–finals
2	Ukraine	3	2	1	0	5	3	+2	7	Advance to Semi–finals
3	Malaysia	3	0	1	2	3	5	−2	1	
4	Russia	3	0	1	2	3	8	−5	1	

Source: FIH

21 June 2009
14:00

Ukraine	2–1	Malaysia
Vasyukova 26'; Vynohradova 46'	Report	Nadia 17'

Umpires:
Celine Martin-Schmets (BEL)
Suman Deswal (IND)

21 June 2009
16:00

Russia	0–4	Ireland
	Report	Symmons 10', 24'; Colvin 22'; Jacob 33'

Umpires:
Anne McRae (SCO)
Gillian Batey (CAN)

22 June 2009
14:00

Ireland	1–1	Ukraine
Colvin 59'	Report	Vynohradova 56'

Umpires:
Liudmila Aleinikoviene (BLR)
Celine Martin-Schmets (BEL)

22 June 2009
16:00

Malaysia	2–2	Russia
Fazilla 6'; Norbaini 63'	Report	Shentsova 35'; Ashurova 50'

Umpires:
Corrine Cornelis (RSA)
Gillian Batey (CAN)

24 June 2009
08:00

Ireland	1–0	Malaysia
Jacob 18'	Report

Umpires:
Corrine Cornelius (RSA)
Gillian Batey (CAN)

24 June 2009
10:00

Russia	1–2	Ukraine
Kovaleva 35+'	Report	Derkach 27'; Vynohradova 46'

Umpires:
Anne McRae (SCO)
Celine Martin-Schmets (BEL)

=== Fifth to eighth place classification ===
Crossover
26 June 2009
Belarus (a.e.t.)	1
Russia	0
26 June 2009
Malaysia	0 (3)
Canada (p.s.o)	0 (4)

Fifth place
27 June 2009
Belarus	2
Canada	1
Seventh place
27 June 2009
Russia	1
Malaysia	2

==== Crossover ====
26 June 2009
08:00

Belarus	1–0 (a.e.t.)	Russia
Shyntar 79'	Report

Umpires:
Suman Chumbak (IND)
Zenia Howe (IRL)

26 June 2009
10:30

Malaysia	0–0	Canada
	Report
Penalties
Nadia (penalty shoot-out missed); Siti S. (penalty shoot-out missed); Juliani (penalty shoot-out missed); Siti N. (penalty shoot-out scored); Nurul (penalty shoot-out missed) —— Siti N. (penalty shoot-out scored); Nadia (penalty shoot-out scored); Siti S. (penalty shoot-out missed)	3–4	(penalty shoot-out missed) Roemer; (penalty shoot-out scored) Jameson; (penalty shoot-out missed) Nesbitt; (penalty shoot-out missed) Kozniuk; (penalty shoot-out missed) Sandhu —— (penalty shoot-out scored) Jameson; (penalty shoot-out scored) Roemer; (penalty shoot-out scored) Nesbitt

Umpires:
Tatyana Kaltypan (UKR)
Liudmila Aleinikoviene (BLR)

==== Seventh and eighth place ====
27 June 2009
08:00

Russia	1–2	Malaysia
Shentsova 47'	Report	Nurul 42', 64'

Umpires:
Celine Martin-Schmets (BEL)
Zenia Howe (IRL)

==== Fifth and sixth place ====
27 June 2009
10:30

Belarus	2–1	Canada
Shyntar 35'; Piotukh 57'	Report	Jameson 66'

Umpires:
Annie Thomas (MAS)
Tatyana Kaltypan (UKR)

=== First to fourth place classification ===
Semi-finals
26 June 2009
India	2
Ukraine	1
26 June 2009
Ireland	1
Belgium	3

Final
27 June 2009
India	6
Belgium	3
Third place
27 June 2009
Ukraine	1
Ireland	2

==== Semifinals ====
26 June 2009
15:30

India	2 – 1	Ukraine
Thokchom 6'; Anjum 23'	Report	Vasyukova 44'

Umpires:
Anne McRae (SCO)
Gillian Batey (CAN)

26 June 2009
18:00

Ireland	1 – 3	Belgium
McCay 10'	Report	Boon 13'; Meuwese 24', 45'

Umpires:
Elena Eskina (RUS)
Corrine Cornelius (RSA)

==== Third and fourth place ====
27 June 2009
15:30

Ukraine	1 – 2	Ireland
Vynohradova 45'		Flinn 8', 62'

Umpires:
Gillian Batey (CAN)
Elena Eskina (RUS)

==== Final ====
27 June 2009
18:00

India	6 – 3	Belgium
Rampal 17', 38', 44', 54'; Anjum 20'; Thokchom 49'	Report	Vermeersch 40', 52'; Boon 55'

Umpires:
Anne McRae (SCO)
Corrine Cornelius (RSA)

2009 Hockey Champions Challenge II

India
First title

== Awards ==
Top Goalscorer	Best Player	Best Goalkeeper	Best Young Player	Fair Play Trophy
(India) Rani Rampal	(India) Surinder Kaur	(Belgium) Nadine Khouzam	(India) Rani Rampal	Ukraine

== Statistics ==
=== Final ranking ===
As per statistical convention in field hockey, matches decided in extra time are counted as wins and losses, while matches decided by penalty shoot-outs are counted as draws.

Pos	Team	Pld	W	D	L	GF	GA	GD	Pts	Status
1st place, gold medalist(s)	India	5	5	0	0	26	9	+17	15	Qualified for 2011 Champions Challenge I
2nd place, silver medalist(s)	Belgium	5	2	1	2	19	15	+4	7	
3rd place, bronze medalist(s)	Ireland	5	3	1	1	9	5	+4	10	
4	Ukraine	5	2	1	2	7	7	0	7	
5	Belarus	5	3	0	2	8	15	−7	9	
6	Canada	5	0	2	3	5	15	−10	2	
7	Malaysia	5	1	2	2	5	6	−1	5	
8	Russia	5	0	1	4	4	11	−7	1	

Source: FIH
