= Laura Bartlett =

Scottish field hockey player

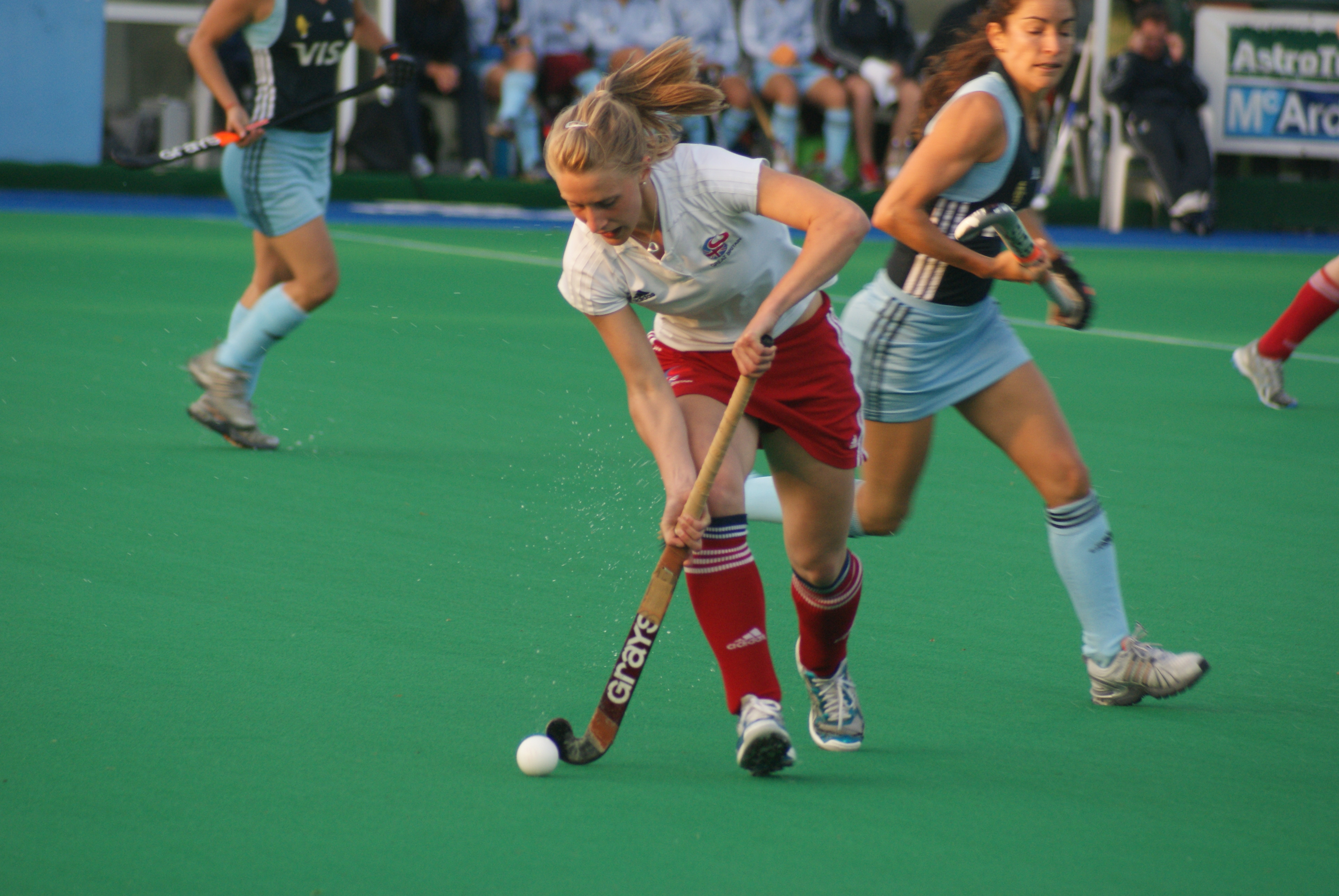

Medal record

Women's field hockey

Representing United Kingdom

Summer Olympics
Bronze medal – third place	2012 London	Team

FIH Champions Trophy
Silver medal – second place	2012 Rosario	Team

Representing Scotland

EuroHockey Nations Trophy
Gold medal – first place	2011 Poznan	Team

FIH Champions Challenge I
Bronze medal – third place	2011 Dublin	Team

Laura Bartlett (born 22 June 1988) is a retired Scottish field hockey player, representing Britain at the 2012 Summer Olympics. She competed for the national team in the women's tournament, winning a bronze medal.

Bartlett announced her retirement in February 2013, having been capped fifty-seven times for Scotland and fifty for Great Britain. The former Milne Craig Clydesdale Western player represented Great Britain at the Summer Olympics in 2004, 2008 and 2012. Bartlett last represented Scotland in 2011, the year in which she was awarded BOA Athlete of the Year.
