= Stephanie Jameson =

Canadian field hockey player

Personal information
- Born: January 23, 1982 (age 44) North Vancouver, British Columbia
- Height: 165 cm (5 ft 5 in)
- Weight: 64 kg (141 lb)

Sport
- Sport: Field hockey
- Position: Defender/Midfielder
Youth career
- Years: Team
- 1990–200x: Vancouver Hawks
Senior career
Years	Team	Caps	Goals
2000–2007	UBC Thunderbirds	-	-
2001–2009	Team British Columbia	-	-
200x–20xx	Meralomas	-	-
2013–2015	Ulster Elks	-	-
National team
Years	Team	Caps	Goals
2002–2012	Canada	168	-

Stephanie Jameson (born January 23, 1982) is a former Canadian women's field hockey international. Between 2012 and 2017 she held the record as Canada's most capped women's field hockey international. She represented Canada at the 2002, 2006 and 2010 Commonwealth Games, at the 2003, 2007 and 2011 Pan American Games and at the 2004 and 2009 Women's Pan American Cups. She won three CIS Championship titles with UBC Thunderbirds in 2001, 2003 and 2004. She also played for Ulster Elks in the Women's Irish Hockey League and helped them win the 2014–15 Irish Senior Cup.

== Early years, family and education ==
Jameson is the daughter of Morley Jameson and Sue Rich. Her mother was also a Canada women's field hockey international, playing for the national team between 1973 and 1979. Her brother, David, is a Canada men's field hockey international and her sister, Kathryn, played field hockey for UBC Thunderbirds. Jameson began playing field hockey at age eight when she joined the Vancouver Hawks. She graduated from the University of British Columbia in 2007 with a Bachelor of Human Kinetics and gained a Master of Science in Sport Management from Ulster University in 2014.

== Domestic teams ==
=== UBC Thunderbirds ===
While attending the University of British Columbia, Jameson played for UBC Thunderbirds at intervarsity level. She was a member of the Thunderbirds team that won three CIS Championship titles in 2001, 2003 and 2004. Both her mother, Sue Rich, and her sister, Kathryn Jameson, also played field hockey for the Thunderbirds.

=== Team British Columbia ===
Jameson has also represented Team British Columbia at provincial level.

=== Ulster Elks ===
Between 2013 and 2015 while studying for her Master of Science in Sport Management at Ulster University, Jameson also played for Ulster Elks in the Women's Irish Hockey League. During this time she also worked for the Sports Institute for Northern Ireland. Together with Sarah McAulay and Michelle Weber she was one of three Canada internationals in the Ulster Elks squad. Together win Megan Frazer and Shirley McCay, Jameson subsequently helped the Elks win the 2014–15 Irish Senior Cup. Jameson also helped coach the Ulster Elks team.

== Canada international ==
Between 2002 and 2012 Jameson made 168 senior appearances for Canada. She made her debut for Canada at the 2002 Commonwealth Games. She also represented Canada at the 2006 and 2010 Commonwealth Games, at the 2003, 2007 and 2011 Pan American Games and at the 2004 and 2009 Women's Pan American Cups. At the 2009 Women's Hockey Champions Challenge II she was named the tournament's Best Defender. In July 2011 she made her 150th senior appearance for Canada against Chile. In February 2012 at a 2012 Women's Field Hockey Olympic Qualifier she won her 164th cap. This saw her become Canada's most capped women's field hockey international, breaking the record previously held by Laurelee Kopeck. Jameson retained this record until Katherine Wright surpassed it in 2017.

Tournaments	Place
2002 Commonwealth Games	7th
2003 Pan American Games	5th
2004 Women's Pan American Cup	3rd
2006 Commonwealth Games	8th
2007 Pan American Games	5th
2008 Women's Field Hockey Olympic Qualifier	4th
2009 Women's Pan American Cup	5th
2009 Women's Hockey Champions Challenge II	6th
2010 Women's Hockey World Cup Qualifiers	4th
2010 Commonwealth Games	6th
2011 Pan American Games	4th
2011 Women's Hockey Champions Challenge II	7th
2012 Women's Field Hockey Olympic Qualifier	5th

== Occupation ==
Since 2016 Jameson has worked for the Canadian Sport Institute in Ontario. She previously worked as a deputy venue manager at the 2015 Pan American Games. She is also a qualified field hockey coach and has helped coach UBC Thunderbirds, the British Columbia representative team and the Ulster Elks.

== Honours ==
Ulster Elks

- Irish Senior Cup
  - Winners: 2014–15: 1

UBC Thunderbirds

- CIS Championship
  - Winners: 2001, 2003, 2004: 3

Team British Columbia

- Canada Summer Games
  - Winners: 2001: 1
- Field Hockey Canada Senior Nationals
  - Winners: 2006, 2008, 2009 : 3
