= Rani Devi =

Indian field hockey player

Rani Devi is a member of the Indian Women's Hockey Team. She was named the Most Promising Young Player of the Tournament at the conclusion of the second qualifier.
