= Jean Duncan (umpire) =

Scottish field hockey umpire

Jean Duncan is a Scottish International Hockey Umpire.

Duncan became an international umpire in March 1999 and became a Grade 1 umpire in November 2001. She has umpired at the 2002 Commonwealth Games, 2002 and 2006 Women's Hockey World Cup and 2004 Olympic Games.

In 2009 the International Hockey Federation presented her with a Golden Whistle as recognition for her 100th senior international match.
