= Dana Sensenig =

American field hockey player

Personal information
- Born: November 30, 1984 (age 41) Lancaster, Pennsylvania, United States

Sport
- Sport: Field hockey

Dana Sensenig (born November 30, 1984) is an American field hockey player. She competed in the women's tournament at the 2008 Summer Olympics.
