= Daniela Infante =

Chilean field hockey player (born 1980)

Personal information
- Full name: Daniela Infante
- Born: 3 September 1980 (age 45) Chile

Sport
- Sport: Field hockey
- Position: Attacker
National team
| Years | Team | Caps | Goals |
| 1999–2011 | Chile | 126 | (148) |
Medal record
Women's field hockey
Representing Chile
Pan American Games
| Bronze medal – third place | 2011 Guadalajara | Team |
South American Games
| Silver medal – second place | 2006 Buenos Aires | Team |

Daniela Infante (born 3 September 1980) is a Chilean field hockey player.

Daniela Infante is the oldest of four siblings, Camila, Denise and Paula, all of whom play international hockey for Chile.

== Career ==
Infante debuted for the senior national team in 1999. Her first major tournament with the team was the 1999 Pan American Games.

Infante retired in 2011 after the Pan American Games in Guadalajara, Mexico. Chile won bronze at the tournament, their first Pan American Games medal.
