= Denise Infante =

Chilean field hockey player (born 1986)

Personal information
- Full name: Denise Infante
- Born: 22 November 1986 (age 39) Santiago, Chile
- Height: 5 ft 6 in (168 cm)

Sport
- Sport: Field hockey
- Position: Defender
National team
Years	Team	Caps	Goals
–2012	Chile	86	-
Medal record
Women's field hockey
Representing Chile
Pan American Games
Bronze medal – third place	2011 Guadalajara	Team
Pan American Cup
Bronze medal – third place	2009 Hamilton	Team

Denise Infante (born 22 November 1980) is a Chilean field hockey player.

== Personal life ==
Denise Infante is the youngest of four sisters, Daniela, Camila and Paula, all of whom play international hockey for Chile.

Infante studied and played hockey at American University.

== Career ==
=== Junior National Team ===
Infante was a member of the Chilean Under 21 side at the 2005 Junior World Cup held in her hometown, Santiago, Chile. Her sister, Camila, was also a member of the team that finished 10th.

=== Senior National Team ===
After representing Chile over a number of years, Infante retired in 2012 after the team failed to qualify for the 2012 Olympic Games in London, United Kingdom.
