= Seo Hye-jin =

South Korean hockey player

Personal information
- Nationality: South Korean
- Born: 27 October 1985 (age 40)

Sport
- Sport: Field hockey
Medal record
Women's field hockey
Representing South Korea
Asia Cup
Silver medal – second place	2007 Hong Kong

Seo Hye-jin (born 27 October 1985) is a South Korean former field hockey player. She competed in the women's tournament at the 2008 Summer Olympics.
