= Gaëlle Valcke =

Belgian field hockey player (born 1986)

Gaelle Valcke (born 20 February 1986) is a Belgian field hockey player. At the 2012 Summer Olympics she competed with the Belgium women's national field hockey team in the women's tournament.
