= Rajwinder Kaur (field hockey, born 1984) =

Indian field hockey player

Personal information
- Born: 26 August 1984 (age 42)
Medal record
Women's field hockey
Representing India
Asian Games
Bronze medal – third place	2006 Doha	Team
Commonwealth Games
Silver medal – second place	2006 Melbourne	Team

Rajwinder Kaur (born 26 August 1984) is an Indian former field hockey player, who represented the India women's national field hockey team. She played with the team when it won the silver medal at the 2006 Commonwealth Games. In November 2011, she married Gurwinder Singh, a Chandigarh-based engineer.
