= Jesse Gey =

American hockey player

Personal information
- Born: July 1, 1985 (age 40) Norristown, Pennsylvania, United States

Sport
- Sport: Field hockey

Jesse Gey (born July 1, 1985) is an American field hockey player. She competed in the women's tournament at the 2008 Summer Olympics.
