= Anne-Sophie Van Regemortel =

Belgian field hockey player (born 1984)

Anne-Sophie van Regemortel (born 13 November 1984) is a Belgian field hockey player. At the 2012 Summer Olympics she competed with the Belgium women's national field hockey team in the women's tournament.
