= Raquel Huertas =

Spanish field hockey player (born 1982)

Raquel Huertas (born 18 July 1982) is a Spanish field hockey player who competed in the 2008 Summer Olympics.
