= Rocío Ybarra =

Spanish field hockey player (born 1984)

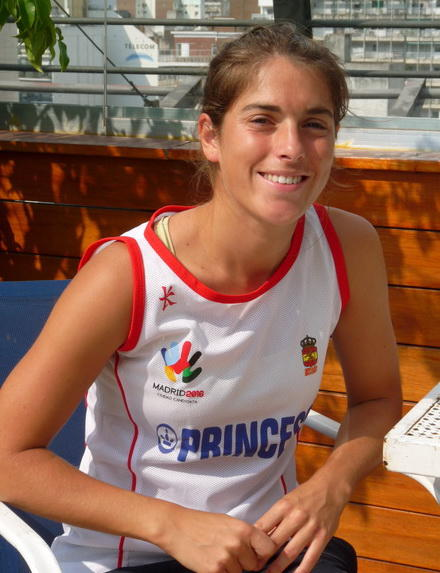
- Ybarra in 2011

Personal information
- Born: 26 December 1984 (age 41) Bilbao, Spain
Medal record
Women's field hockey
Representing Spain
Champions Challenge
Silver medal – second place	2003 Catania	Team Competition

Rocío Ybarra Solaun (born 26 December 1984) is a field hockey defender from Spain, who represented her native country at the 2004 Olympic Games in Athens, the 2008 Games in Beijing and the 2016 Games in Rio de Janeiro, where she was captain (Spain did not qualify for the field hockey event at the 2012 Olympics).

At club level, she played for Real Club Jolaseta and RC Polo in the Spanish system, for UHC Hamburg in Germany, and for Kampong, HDM and Oranje Zwart in the Netherlands. She played internationally with the Spain national team that finished fourth at the 2006 Women's Hockey World Cup in Madrid under the guidance of coach Pablo Usoz.

Her family has played hockey at a high level for three generations; her twin sister Lucía was also selected for Spain while her great-uncle Julio Solaun (known as Javier) competed at the 1964 and 1968 Olympic Games.
