= Sarah Forbes (field hockey) =

Canadian field hockey player

- Born: January 11, 1973 (age 53) Victoria, British Columbia, Canada
- Position: Goalkeeper
- OUA team: York University
- Playing career: 1991–1997

Sarah Forbes (born January 11, 1973) is a Canadian former field hockey goaltender who played for York University and the Women's Senior National Team.

== Early life ==
Born in Victoria, British Columbia, Forbes was raised in Fredericton, New Brunswick, and now lives in Sudbury, Ontario. She started playing hockey in 1989 at high school as a field player but changed to goalkeeper. The summer she switched to goalie, her New Brunswick team won the Gold Medal at the Canada Games. From 1991 until 1997, Forbes played with the York University field hockey team, which earned her the Gail Wilson Award for Player of the Year. She was also York University Athlete of the Year in 1998.

== Career ==
She debuted for the Women's Senior National Team in 1993 for the Junior World Cup in Barcelona, where Canada finished 8th.

Forbes was a paramedic for Toronto EMS for over 15 years and teaches at CTS Canadian Career College. She also works at Laurentian University as their varsity medical coordinator and at Sudbury District Public Health with their Covid-19 Response team. Forbes also worked as an assistant coach for the York University field hockey team from 1999 to 2009 and the University of Guelph from 2010 to 2012.

== International senior tournaments ==
- 1994 – World Cup, Dublin, Ireland (10th)
- 1995 – Olympic Qualifier, Cape Town, South Africa (7th)
- 1997 – World Cup Qualifier, Harare, Zimbabwe (11th)
- 1998 – Commonwealth Games, Kuala Lumpur, Malaysia (not ranked)
- 1999 – Pan American Games, Winnipeg, Manitoba, Canada (3rd)
- 2001 – Americas Cup, Kingston, Jamaica (3rd)
- 2002 – Commonwealth Games, Manchester, England (7th)
- 2003 – Pan American Games, Santo Domingo, Dominican Republic (5th)
- 2004 – Pan Am Cup, Bridgetown, Barbados (3rd)
- 2006 – Commonwealth Games, Melbourne, Australia (8th)
- 2007 – 2007 Pan American Games, Rio de Janeiro, Brazil
- 2008 – 2008 Olympic Qualifier, Victoria (4th)
