= Anouk Raes =

Belgian field hockey player

Personal information
- Born: 30 December 1988 (age 37) Uccle, Belgium
- Height: 1.74 m (5 ft 9 in)
- Weight: 66 kg (146 lb)

Sport
- Sport: Field hockey
- Position: Midfielder/Forward
- Club: Royal Racing Club
National team
Years	Team	Caps	Goals
–	Belgium	279	-
Medal record
Women's field hockey
Representing Belgium
European Championships
Silver medal – second place	2017 Amstelveen

Anouk Raes (born 30 December 1988) is a Belgian field hockey player. At the 2012 Summer Olympics she competed with the Belgium women's national field hockey team in the women's tournament.
