= Bárbara Malda =

Spanish field hockey player (born 1984)

Bárbara Malda Salinas (Note: In this Spanish name, the first or paternal surname is Malda and the second or maternal family name is Salinas.) (born 12 May 1984 in Bilbao) is a Spanish field hockey player who competed in the 2004 Summer Olympics and in the 2008 Summer Olympics.

She has a degree in psychology and works in the Human Resources Department at Sanitas Hospitals.
