= Jasbeer Singh =

Italian field hockey player (born 1986)

Personal information
- Born: 17 September 1986 (age 39) Bra, Piedmont

Sport
- Sport: Field hockey
- Position: Midfielder
- Club: Royal Léopold Club
National team
Years	Team	Caps	Goals
–	Italy	73	-

Jasbeer Singh (born 17 September 1986) is an Italian field hockey player for the Italian national team.

She participated at the 2018 Women's Hockey World Cup.

== Early life and family ==
Jasbeer Singh was born on 17 September 1986 in Bra, Piedmont. Her father Inder Singh represented India in the 1968 Summer Olympics. Her mother Gianna Fissore was also a national-level hockey player for Italy. She graduated in accounting from Istituto di Istruzione Secondaria Superiore Ernesto Guala.
