= Paula Infante =

Chilean field hockey player (born 1982)

Personal information
- Full name: Paula Infante
- Born: 25 July 1982 (age 44) Santiago, Chile
- Height: 168 cm (5 ft 6 in)

Sport
- Sport: Field hockey
- Position: Midfield
National team
Years	Team	Caps	Goals
1999–2019	Chile	165	(–)
Medal record
Women's field hockey
Representing Chile
Pan American Games
Bronze medal – third place	2011 Guadalajara	Team
Pan American Cup
Bronze medal – third place	2009 Hamilton	Team
South American Championship
Silver medal – second place	2013 Santiago	Team

Denise Infante (born 25 July 1982) is a former Chilean field hockey player.

== Personal life ==
Infante studied and played hockey at the University of Maryland.

== Career ==
=== College hockey ===
After graduating from Santiago College, Infante travelled to the United States and played hockey for the Maryland Terrapins. During her college career, Infante received a number of awards, including the Honda Sports Award for the 2005–06 and 2006–07 seasons, and the ACC Athlete of the Year award in 2006.

=== Las Diablas ===
Infante first represented the national team in 1999, making her first major appearance at the Pan American Games in Winnipeg.

Throughout her career, Infante medalled at two major tournaments, winning bronze at both the 2009 Pan American Cup in Hamilton and at the 2011 Pan American Games in Guadalajara.

Following a six-year hiatus from the national team, Infante returned to the squad in 2019 in an attempt to help the team qualify for the 2020 Summer Olympics in Tokyo.
