= Charlotte De Vos =

Belgian field hockey player

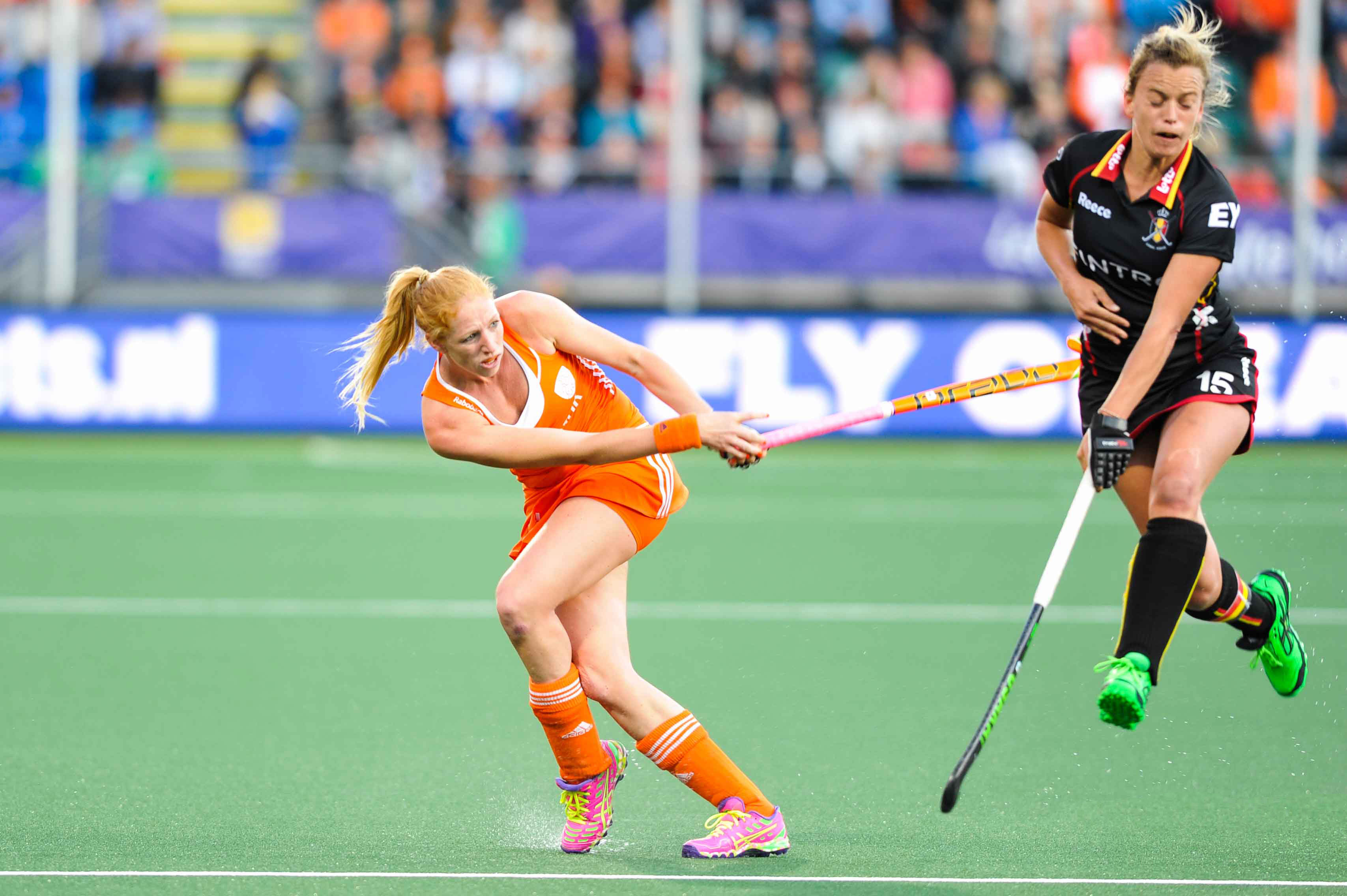

Personal information
- Full name: Charlotte De Vos Meerbergen
- Born: 8 October 1983 (age 42) Antwerp, Belgium
- Height: 166 cm (5 ft 5 1/2 in)
- Weight: 59 kg (130 lb)

Sport
- Sport: Field hockey
- Club: Royal Victory HC
National team
Years	Team	Caps	Goals
2012-2014	Belgium	199	(7)
- Updated on 29 December 2021

Charlotte De Vos Meerbergen (born 8 October 1983) is a Belgian field hockey player. She played in the Dutch League for Oranje Zwart in Eindhoven as an attacker and was a captain of the Belgium women's national field hockey team until 2014. At the 2012 Summer Olympics she competed with the Belgium women's national field hockey team in the women's tournament.

De Vos began her career at Royal Victory HC. She played in the Netherlands since 2008, in the 2008/09 season at MHC Laren then played for Oranje Zwart. In 2014, she decided to return to Royal Victory HC. Beside hockey, she is also co-owner of Twizzit, an online platform for sportclubs.

On 23 June 2015, she married Paul Meerbergen in the presence of her two maids of honour, Caroline De Vos and Sofie Christiaens.
