= Australia women's national field hockey team results (2001–2005) =

List of field hockey results of Australian national team

The following article comprises the results of the Hockeyroos, the women's national field hockey team from Australia, from 2001 until 2005. New fixtures can be found on the International Hockey Federation's results portal.

== Match results ==
=== 2001 results ===
2001 statistics
Team	Pld	W	D	L	GF	GA	GD	Pts
Australia	28	18	5	5	84	39	+45	59

==== Argentina test series ====
22 April 2001 Test match	Argentina	1–1	Australia	Rosario, Argentina
	Oneto 22'	Report	Mitchell-Taverner 54'

24 April 2001 Test match	Argentina	2–1	Australia	Rosario, Argentina
	Rognoni 3'; Oneto 45'	Report	Dobson 53'

26 April 2001 Test match	Argentina	1–1	Australia	Córdoba, Argentina
	70+'	Report	Mitchell-Taverner 32'

28 April 2001 Test match	Argentina	2–0	Australia	Buenos Aires, Argentina
	Oneto 41'; Gulla 66'	Report

==== III East Asian Games ====
22 May 2001 Group stage	South Korea	3–6	Australia	Osaka, Japan
	43', 48', 61'	Report	Powell 2', 40'; Morrison 13', 67'; Dobson 55', 66'

23 May 2001 Group stage	Australia	4–1	Japan	Osaka, Japan
	K. Towers 8'; Dobson 17', 30'; N. Smith 41'	Report	38'

25 May 2001 Group stage	China	1–4	Australia	Osaka, Japan
	43', 48', 61'	Report	Powell 4', 54', 65'; Morrison 22'

27 May 2001 Gold Medal Match	Australia	7–1	South Korea	Osaka, Japan
	Hudson 20', 55', 61'; Powell 49', 68'; K. Towers 54'; Morrison 58'	Report	29'

==== III Korea Telecom Cup ====
27 June 2001 Group stage	Australia	3–2	England	Busan, South Korea
	Towers 2'; Souter 30'; Mitchell-Taverner 54'	Report	Smith 4'; 19'

28 June 2001 Group stage	Australia	1–1	Japan	Busan, South Korea
5:30	Powell 27'	Report	37'

30 June 2001 Group stage	China	1–1	Australia	Busan, South Korea
11:00	Wang J. 65'	Report	Towers 12'

1 July 2001 Group stage	Australia	5–1	United States	Busan, South Korea
11:30	Powell 5'; Towers 8', 45'; Alcorn 27', 54'	Report	Meerschwam 17'

3 July 2001 Group stage	South Korea	1–1	Australia	Busan, South Korea
15:00	Jo 47'	Report	Powell 27'

4 July 2001 Third place match	Australia	8–4	England	Busan, South Korea
15:30	Mitchell-Taverner 5', 30', 70'; Powell 16'; Patrick 19'; Banning 28', 42'; Sargeant 68'	Report	Miller 34'; Bennett 44'; King 46'; Smith 69'

==== II Oceania Cup ====
26 July 2001 Match 1	New Zealand	1–3	Australia	Wellington, New Zealand
15:30	Ward 58'	Report	Towers 24'; Banning 31'; Dobson 38'

28 July 2001 Match 2	New Zealand	2–5	Australia	Auckland, New Zealand
15:30	Pearce 12', 55'	Report	Annan 9', 10', 14', 48'; Powell 17'

29 July 2001 Match 3	New Zealand	1–3	Australia	Hamilton, New Zealand
11:00	Munns 50'	Report	Hudson 5'; Skirving 24'; Walker 32'

==== Netherlands test match ====
11 August 2001 Test match	Australia	1–3	Netherlands	Amsterdam, Netherlands
	Powell 54'	Report	Van den Boogaard 25'; Cornelis 40'; Smabers 45'	Stadium: Wagener Stadium

==== IX FIH Champions Trophy ====
18 August 2001 Group stage	New Zealand	1–5	Australia	Amsterdam, Netherlands
17:00	Powell 54'	Report	Towers 2', 37'; Smith 26', 30'; Hudson 60'	Stadium: Wagener Stadium

19 August 2001 Group stage	China	0–3	Australia	Amsterdam, Netherlands
17:00		Report	Smith 64'; Hudson 68'; Powell 69'	Stadium: Wagener Stadium

21 August 2001 Group stage	Argentina	2–1	Australia	Amsterdam, Netherlands
17:00	Margalot 34'; Rognoni 50'	Report	Hudson 6'	Stadium: Wagener Stadium

22 August 2001 Group stage	Netherlands	3–1	Australia	Amsterdam, Netherlands
20:00	Boomgaardt 11', 23'; Smabers 33'	Report	Hudson 42'	Stadium: Wagener Stadium

24 August 2001 Group stage	Spain	0–1	Australia	Amsterdam, Netherlands
17:30		Report	Banning 57'	Stadium: Wagener Stadium

26 August 2001 Bronze Medal Match	Australia	2–1 (a.e.t.)	China	Amsterdam, Netherlands
11:30	Powell 48', 81'	Report	Tang 41'	Stadium: Wagener Stadium

==== New Zealand test series ====
27 October 2001 Test match	Australia	3–2	New Zealand	Melbourne, Australia
	Morrison 35'; Powell 49'; Dobson 50'	Report	Pearce 13'; Provan 38'	Stadium: State Netball and Hockey Centre

28 October 2001 Test match	Australia	4–3	New Zealand	Melbourne, Australia
	Patrick 11'; Dobson 15'; Morrison 20'; Halliday 33'	Report	Senior 50', 56'; Igasan 58'	Stadium: State Netball and Hockey Centre

3 November 2001 Test match	Australia	4–0	New Zealand	Sydney, Australia
	Morrison 39'; N. Smith 52'; Powell 53', 55'	Report		Stadium: Sydney Olympic Park

4 November 2001 Test match	Australia	5–0	New Zealand	Sydney, Australia
	N. Smith 4', 28'; Banning 24', 31', 57'	Report		Stadium: Sydney Olympic Park

=== 2002 results ===
2002 statistics
Team	Pld	W	D	L	GF	GA	GD	Pts
Australia	33	18	6	9	86	45	+41	60

==== Six Nations (Gifu) ====
29 April 2002 Group stage	Australia	5–2	Russia	Gifu, Japan
	Morrison 9', 39', 49'; N. Smith 37'; Patrick 67'	Report	Yudovskaye 53'; Basychuk 68'

30 April 2002 Group stage	Germany	2–2	Australia	Gifu, Japan
	Böhmert 17'; Reiter 34'	Report	N. Smith 42'; Paget 59'

2 May 2002 Group stage	South Korea	2–3	Australia	Gifu, Japan
	Lee M. 7'; Kim E. 52'	Report	Faulkner 25'; Langham-Pritchard 29'; N. Smith 60'

3 May 2002 Group stage	Australia	1–1	Japan	Gifu, Japan
	Langham-Pritchard 20'	Report	Miura 41'

5 May 2002 Group stage	Australia	3–1	United States	Gifu, Japan
	Morrison 30', 32'; Taylor 58'	Report	Smith 28'

6 May 2002 Final	South Korea	3–0	Australia	Gifu, Japan
	Kim E. 5'; Kim Y. 51', 61'	Report

==== Hockey Australia International Challenge ====
13 June 2002 Group stage	Australia	2–1	South Korea	Perth, Australia
	Netzler 39'; N. Smith 63'	Report	Kim E. 55'	Stadium: Perth Hockey Stadium

14 June 2002 Group stage	Japan	1–5	Australia	Perth, Australia
	Iwao 35'	Report	K. Smith 10', 57'; Dobson 14'; Morrison 28'; Banning 60'	Stadium: Perth Hockey Stadium

19 June 2002 Group stage	Australia	4–2	Japan	Sydney, Australia
	Gallagher 19'; Powell 25'; Towers 35'; K. Smith 51'	Report	Morimoto 14'; Yasueda 62'	Stadium: Sydney Olympic Park

22 June 2002 Group stage	South Korea	1–2	Australia	Sydney, Australia
	Kim E. 23'	Report	Towers 12', 69'	Stadium: Sydney Olympic Park

23 June 2002 Final	Australia	0–1	South Korea	Sydney, Australia
		Report	Lee S. 45'	Stadium: Sydney Olympic Park

==== Netherlands test series ====
20 July 2002 Final	Netherlands	3–0	Australia	Amsterdam, Netherlands
	Scorers undocumented.	Report		Stadium: Wagener Stadium

21 July 2002 Final	Netherlands	2–2	Australia	Amsterdam, Netherlands
	Donners 8'; Boomgaardt 60'	Report	Morrison 25', 36'	Stadium: Wagener Stadium

==== XVII Commonwealth Games ====
26 July 2002 Group stage	Australia	3–0	Scotland	Manchester, England
11:00	Powell 28'; Morrison 32'; Towers 65'	Report		Stadium: Belle Vue Hockey Stadium

27 July 2002 Group stage	South Africa	1–4	Australia	Manchester, England
17:30	Coetzee 36'	Report	Morrison 4'; Dobson 26', 28'; Towers 31'	Stadium: Belle Vue Hockey Stadium

29 July 2002 Group stage	Australia	18–0	Malaysia	Manchester, England
11:00	Dobson 7', 37', 67'; Langham-Pritchard 11'; Banning 13', 48'; Hudson 14', 20', 22'; Morrison 25'; K. Smith 34', 59'; Towers 42'; Netzler 45'; N. Smith 46', 55', 62', 64'	Report		Stadium: Belle Vue Hockey Stadium

1 August 2002 Semi-finals	Australia	1–2	England	Manchester, England
18:30	Dobson 67'	Report	Walsh 17'; Grant 25'	Stadium: Belle Vue Hockey Stadium

3 August 2002 Bronze Medal Match	Australia	4–3	New Zealand	Manchester, England
13:00	Bakurski 8'; Banning 14'; N. Smith 44'; Powell 45'	Report	Christie 10'; Provan 23'; Pearce 70'	Stadium: Belle Vue Hockey Stadium

==== X FIH Champions Trophy ====
24 August 2002 Group stage	Australia	0–0	Netherlands	Macau, China
17:00		Report		Stadium: Macao Stadium

25 August 2002 Group stage	Australia	0–1	China	Macau, China
20:00		Report	Ma 58'	Stadium: Macao Stadium

27 August 2002 Group stage	Australia	3–1	New Zealand	Macau, China
16:00	Dobson 28'; Powell 35'; Alcorn 45'	Report	Christie 8'	Stadium: Macao Stadium

28 August 2002 Group stage	Australia	2–0	England	Macau, China
16:00	Banning 20'; Alcorn 31'	Report		Stadium: Macao Stadium

30 August 2002 Group stage	Argentina	2–2	Australia	Macau, China
20:00	García 6'; Oneto 39'	Report	Towers 25'; Skirving 60'	Stadium: Macao Stadium

1 September 2002 Bronze Medal Match	Australia	3–4 (a.e.t.)	Netherlands	Macau, China
17:30	Gallagher 18'; Dobson 26', 68'	Report	Boomgaardt 32', 51'; Moreira de Melo 63'; Donners 73'	Stadium: Macao Stadium

==== X FIH World Cup ====
24 November 2002 Group stage	Australia	4–0	United States	Perth, Australia
11:05	Hudson 3'; Powell 9'; Alcorn 17'; K. Smith 26'	Report		Stadium: Perth Hockey Stadium

25 November 2002 Group stage	Spain	0–1	Australia	Perth, Australia
20:05		Report	Powell 61'	Stadium: Perth Hockey Stadium

27 November 2002 Group stage	Australia	2–1	Ireland	Perth, Australia
18:05	K. Smith 10'; Powell 14'	Report	Burke 25'	Stadium: Perth Hockey Stadium

29 November 2002 Group stage	England	1–3	Australia	Perth, Australia
20:05	King 24'	Report	Dobson 23'; Powell 30', 62'	Stadium: Perth Hockey Stadium

1 December 2002 Group stage	Australia	1–3	Netherlands	Perth, Australia
11:05	K. Smith 43'	Report	Donners 5' van Geenhuizen 24'; Smabers 52'	Stadium: Perth Hockey Stadium

2 December 2002 Group stage	Australia	5–0	South Africa	Perth, Australia
20:05	Towers 1'; Skirving 10'; Hudson 26'; Netzler 42'; Twitt 51'	Report		Stadium: Perth Hockey Stadium

4 December 2002 Group stage	Australia	1–1	Japan	Perth, Australia
18:05	Dobson 12'	Report	Yamamoto 19'	Stadium: Perth Hockey Stadium

6 December 2002 Semi-finals	Argentina	1–0	Australia	Perth, Australia
18:05	García 8'	Report		Stadium: Perth Hockey Stadium

8 December 2002 Bronze Medal Match	Australia	0–2	China	Perth, Australia
10:05		Report	Ma 13'; Chen Z. 32'	Stadium: Perth Hockey Stadium

=== 2003 results ===
2003 statistics
Team	Pld	W	D	L	GF	GA	GD	Pts
Australia	22	16	2	4	51	14	+37	50

==== III Oceania Cup ====
25 May 2003 Match 1	Australia	2–0	New Zealand	Melbourne, Australia
14:00	Skirving 6'; Towers 45'	Report		Stadium: State Netball and Hockey Centre

29 May 2003 Match 2	New Zealand	0–2	Australia	Whangārei, New Zealand
18:30		Report	Gallagher 15'; Powell 52'

31 May 2003 Match 3	New Zealand	0–6	Australia	Wellington, New Zealand
13:15		Report	Skirving 5'; Powell 15', 42', 54'; K. Smith 17'; N. Smith 64'

==== IV Korea Telecom Cup ====
20 June 2003 Group stage	England	2–1	Australia	Busan, South Korea
16:00	Smith 12'; King 64'	Report	Dobson 69'

21 June 2003 Group stage	Australia	2–2	South Africa	Busan, South Korea
16:30	Faulkner 41'; N. Smith 53'	Report	Coetzee 1'; De Kock 33'

23 June 2003 Group stage	South Korea	1–0	Australia	Busan, South Korea
11:00	Smith 24'	Report

24 June 2003 Group stage	Australia	3–0	Spain	Busan, South Korea
12:20	Faulkner 27'; Towers 40'; Gallagher 58'	Report

26 June 2003 Group stage	Australia	1–0	Netherlands	Busan, South Korea
12:20	Faulkner 8'	Report

27 June 2003 Third place match	South Africa	Cancelled	Australia	Busan, South Korea
14:30		Report

==== Europe test matches ====
11 August 2003 Test match	Australia	1–0	China	Barcelona, Spain
	Skirving 47'	Report

12 August 2003 Test match	Spain	1–5	Australia	Barcelona, Spain
	4'	Report	Alcorn 10'; Dobson 37'; Hudson 51'; Gallagher 62'; Skirving 64'

14 August 2003 Test match	Spain	0–2	Australia	Barcelona, Spain
		Report	Powell 58'; Hudson 63'

15 August 2003 Test match	Australia	2–0	China	Barcelona, Spain
	Skirving 49'; Gallagher 57'	Report

==== I RaboTrophy ====
18 August 2003 Group stage	Argentina	0–3	Australia	Amsterdam, Netherlands
		Report	Netzler 41'; K. Smith 48'; Skirving 69'	Stadium: Wagener Stadium

19 August 2003 Group stage	Australia	3–1	Germany	Amsterdam, Netherlands
	Towers 39', 44', 60'	Report	Kollmar 19'	Stadium: Wagener Stadium

22 August 2003 Group stage	Australia	0–1	Netherlands	Amsterdam, Netherlands
		Report	Lammers 70'	Stadium: Wagener Stadium

23 August 2003 Final	Netherlands	1–2	Australia	Amsterdam, Netherlands
	Donners 67'	Report	Gallagher 12'; Rivers 17'	Stadium: Wagener Stadium

==== XI FIH Champions Trophy ====
29 November 2003 Group stage	Australia	5–0	England	Sydney, Australia
15:00	Skirving 19'; Powell 37', 62'; Netzler 62'; Faulkner 65'	Report		Stadium: Sydney Olympic Park

30 November 2003 Group stage	Australia	2–1	Netherlands	Sydney, Australia
15:00	Bakurski 2'; Powell 42'	Report	Schopman 49'	Stadium: Sydney Olympic Park

2 December 2003 Group stage	Australia	0–1	China	Sydney, Australia
20:00		Report	Fu 22'	Stadium: Sydney Olympic Park

4 December 2003 Group stage	Argentina	1–1	Australia	Sydney, Australia
20:00	García 68'	Report	Gallagher 67'	Stadium: Sydney Olympic Park

6 December 2003 Group stage	Australia	5–0	South Korea	Sydney, Australia
15:00	Powell 25'; Skirving 28'; Dobson 29'; Towers 37'; Alcorn 67'	Report		Stadium: Sydney Olympic Park

7 December 2003 Gold Medal Match	China	2–3	Australia	Sydney, Australia
15:00	Fu 43'; Li S. 64'	Report	Towers 1'; Faulkner 14'; Gallagher 16'	Stadium: Sydney Olympic Park

=== 2004 results ===
2004 statistics
Team	Pld	W	D	L	GF	GA	GD	Pts
Australia	37	23	3	11	97	50	+47	72

==== Athens International Hockey Tournament ====
4 February 2004 Group stage	Australia	0–1	Spain	Athens, Greece
13:30		Report	Tellería 37'	Stadium: Hellinikon Olympic Hockey Centre

5 February 2004 Group stage	Great Britain	2–2	Australia	Athens, Greece
13:30	Clement 31', 47'	Report	Faulkner 6'; Gallagher 54'	Stadium: Hellinikon Olympic Hockey Centre

7 February 2004 Group stage	Australia	3–4	South Africa	Athens, Greece
14:00	Faulkner 6'; Dobson 7'; Powell 53'	Report	Marescia 9'; Coetzee 19', 60', 63'	Stadium: Hellinikon Olympic Hockey Centre

8 February 2004 Third place match	Great Britain	0–2	Australia	Athens, Greece
12:00		Report	Dobson 35'; Powell 59'	Stadium: Hellinikon Olympic Hockey Centre

==== South Africa test series ====
11 February 2004 Test match	South Africa	1–2	Australia	Pretoria, South Africa
	Webber 8'	Report	Powell 14'; Dobson 57'

12 February 2004 Test match	South Africa	1–2	Australia	Pretoria, South Africa
	Coetzee 48'	Report	Faulkner 27'; K. Smith 58'

14 February 2004 Test match	South Africa	1–2	Australia	Johannesburg, South Africa
	Coetzee 33'	Report	Faulkner 19'; Halliday 43'

15 February 2004 Test match	South Africa	2–3	Australia	Johannesburg, South Africa
	Coetzee 57'; Webber 59'	Report	Taylor 15'; Towers 50', 54'

==== China test series ====
20 April 2004 Test match	Australia	1–3	China	Adelaide, Australia
	K. Smith 31'	Report	Fu 17'; Cheng 30'; Chen Z. 41'	Stadium: State Hockey Centre

21 April 2004 Test match	Australia	4–1	China	Adelaide, Australia
	Powell 31', 43', 64'; Brown 47'	Report	Tang 4'	Stadium: State Hockey Centre

24 April 2004 Test match	Australia	4–0	China	Melbourne, Australia
	Harris 8', 24', 59'; Powell 62'	Report		Stadium: State Hockey Centre

25 April 2004 Test match	Australia	2–1	China	Melbourne, Australia
	Powell 66'; Dobson 69'	Report	Ma Y. 46'	Stadium: State Hockey Centre

==== India test series ====
28 April 2004 Test match	Australia	Cancelled	India	Murwillumbah, Australia
		Report

30 April 2004 Test match	Australia	3–3	India	Toowoomba, Australia
	Netzler 20', 43'; Dobson 38'	Report	Mamta 9', 12'; Surinder 14'

1 May 2004 Test match	Australia	5–1	India	Buderim, Australia
15:00	Halliday 24'; N. Smith 33'; K. Smith 34'; Powell 38'; Dobson 46'	Report	Sanggai 22'

2 May 2004 Test match	Australia	9–2	India	Buderim, Australia
15:00	Netzler 9'; Towers 23', 25', 55'; Harris 30', 69'; Powell 43'; Arrold 50'; Brown 65'	Report	Suman 28', 39'

==== Three Nations (Darwin) ====
16 June 2004 Group stage	Australia	6–3	New Zealand	Darwin, Australia
20:00	Dobson 13'; Faulkner 27', 49'; Towers 35'; K. Smith 58'; Bakurski 67'	Report	Walton 7', 22'; Provan 31'	Stadium: Marrara Hockey Centre

19 June 2004 Group stage	Japan	1–5	Australia	Darwin, Australia
15:00	Morimoto 16'	Report	Netzler 8', 48'; Faulkner 25'; N. Smith 56', 63'	Stadium: Marrara Hockey Centre

20 June 2004 Final	Australia	4–0	New Zealand	Darwin, Australia
17:00	Dobson 5'; Towers 27'; Faulkner 30'; Powell 32'	Report		Stadium: Marrara Hockey Centre

==== Three Nations (Townsville) ====
23 June 2004 Group stage	Australia	3–1	Japan	Townsville, Australia
20:00	Alcorn 6'; K. Smith 12'; N. Smith 44'	Report	Nakagawa 18'

26 June 2004 Group stage	Australia	2–0	New Zealand	Townsville, Australia
15:00	Faulkner 3'; Towers 37'	Report

27 June 2004 Final	Australia	3–2 (a.e.t.)	Japan	Townsville, Australia
17:00	N. Smith 22'; Towers 38'; Powell 74'	Report	Kitada 33'; Chiba 58'

==== Four Nations (Alcalá la Real) ====
30 July 2004 Group stage	Spain	0–6	Australia	Alcalá la Real, Spain
		Report	K. Smith 2', 50'; Skirving 14'; Hudson 28'; Powell 38'; Netzler 60'

31 July 2004 Group stage	Australia	0–2	Netherlands	Alcalá la Real, Spain
		Report	Boomgaardt 25'; Booij 35'

2 August 2004 Group stage	Argentina	1–0	Australia	Alcalá la Real, Spain
	García 3'	Report

3 August 2004 Group stage	Australia	4–0	Spain	Alcalá la Real, Spain
	N. Smith 12', 59'; Towers 53'; Dobson 65'	Report

==== XXVIII Summer Olympic Games ====
14 August 2004 Group stage	Australia	1–2	Germany	Athens, Greece
18:00	Towers 53'	Report	Ernsting-Krienke 21'; Müller 34'	Stadium: Hellinikon Olympic Hockey Centre

16 August 2004 Group stage	South Africa	0–3	Australia	Athens, Greece
10:30		Report	Towers 28'; Faulkner 34'; Gallagher 59'	Stadium: Hellinikon Olympic Hockey Centre

20 August 2004 Group stage	South Africa	2–2	Australia	Athens, Greece
08:30	Park M. 31'; Kim S. 46'	Report	Dobson 6'; Powell 43'	Stadium: Hellinikon Olympic Hockey Centre

22 August 2004 Group stage	Australia	0–1	Netherlands	Athens, Greece
20:00		Report	Donners 47'	Stadium: Hellinikon Olympic Hockey Centre

24 August 2004 Crossover	Japan	1–3	Australia	Athens, Greece
11:00	Komori 15'	Report	Gallagher 27'; Faulkner 33'; Powell 37'	Stadium: Hellinikon Olympic Hockey Centre

27 August 2004 Fifth place match	New Zealand	0–3	Australia	Athens, Greece
11:00		Report	Towers 14'; Powell 42', 67'	Stadium: Hellinikon Olympic Hockey Centre

==== XII FIH Champions Trophy ====
6 November 2004 Group stage	Australia	0–1	Germany	Rosario, Argentina
16:00		Report	Kühn 45'	Stadium: Jockey Club de Rosario

7 November 2004 Group stage	Netherlands	2–1	Australia	Rosario, Argentina
16:00	De Bruijn 45'; Scheepstra 59'	Report	Faulkner 9'	Stadium: Jockey Club de Rosario

9 November 2004 Group stage	Australia	1–5	Argentina	Rosario, Argentina
21:15	Faulkner 46'	Report	Gulla 20'; Oneto 23', 56'; García 36', 40'	Stadium: Jockey Club de Rosario

11 November 2004 Group stage	China	0–1	Australia	Rosario, Argentina
18:15		Report	Brown 3'	Stadium: Jockey Club de Rosario

13 November 2004 Group stage	New Zealand	0–3	Australia	Rosario, Argentina
13:45		Report	Arrold 19', 61'; Hudson 46'	Stadium: Jockey Club de Rosario

14 November 2004 Bronze Medal Match	Argentina	3–2	Australia	Rosario, Argentina
18:45	Rognoni 19', 48'; Aymar 54'	Report	Smith 8'; Faulkner 34'	Stadium: Jockey Club de Rosario

=== 2005 results ===
2005 statistics
Team	Pld	W	D	L	GF	GA	GD	Pts
Australia	30	23	6	1	76	23	+53	75

==== United States test series ====
4 June 2005 Test match	United States	3–3	Australia	Virginia Beach, United States
19:00	Snow 43', 59'; Rizzo 68'	Report	Rivers 51'; Taylor 58'; Ditton 61'	Stadium: Virginia Beach Sportsplex

5 June 2005 Test match	United States	0–4	Australia	Virginia Beach, United States
19:00		Report	Rivers 5'; Harris 23'; Taylor 39'; Twitt 50'	Stadium: Virginia Beach Sportsplex

8 June 2005 Test match	United States	2–4	Australia	Virginia Beach, United States
18:00	Doton 5'; Snow 7'	Report	Faulkner 9'; Harris 23'; Johnson 48'; K. Smith 65'	Stadium: Virginia Beach Sportsplex

11 June 2005 Test match	United States	1–1	Australia	Virginia Beach, United States
18:00	Snow 42'	Report	Attard 44'	Stadium: Virginia Beach Sportsplex

==== Canada test series ====
15 June 2005 Test match	Canada	0–1	Australia	Vancouver, Canada
18:00		Report	Arrold 25'	Stadium: West Vancouver Field Hockey Club

16 June 2005 Test match	Canada	0–5	Australia	Vancouver, Canada
18:00		Report	Skirving 5', 63', 68'; Arrold 47', 49'	Stadium: West Vancouver Field Hockey Club

18 June 2005 Test match	Canada	0–1	Australia	Vancouver, Canada
15:00		Report	Skirving 39'	Stadium: West Vancouver Field Hockey Club

19 June 2005 Test match	Canada	0–6	Australia	Vancouver, Canada
15:00		Report	Faulkner 5', 19', 66'; Harris 33'; Halliday 37'; Johnson 69'	Stadium: West Vancouver Field Hockey Club

==== Korea test series ====
11 August 2005 Test match	Australia	3–2	South Korea	Adelaide, Australia
18:30	Hudson 8'; Patrick 18'; Skirving 70'	Report	Kim M. 35'; Park S. 47'	Stadium: State Hockey Centre

12 August 2005 Test match	Australia	2–1	South Korea	Adelaide, Australia
18:30	Smithson 29'; Hudson 55'	Report	Kim M. 5'	Stadium: State Hockey Centre

14 August 2005 Test match	Australia	2–1	South Korea	Adelaide, Australia
14:00	Skirving 60'; Hudson 69'	Report	Kim Y. 22'	Stadium: State Hockey Centre

18 August 2005 Test match	Australia	2–1	South Korea	Brisbane, Australia
	Patrick 22'; Hudson 55'	Report	Kim J. 22'	Stadium: Queensland Hockey Centre

20 August 2005 Test match	Australia	5–0	South Korea	Brisbane, Australia
	Hudson 15', 69'; K. Smith 25'; Blyth 26'; Skirving 42'	Report		Stadium: Queensland Hockey Centre

21 August 2005 Test match	Australia	4–2	South Korea	Brisbane, Australia
	K. Smith 28', 45'; Hudson 42'; Hollywood 26'	Report	Kim J. 31'; Park J. 65'	Stadium: Queensland Hockey Centre

==== XII Indira Gandhi Cup ====
2 October 2005 Group stage	New Zealand	0–0	Australia	New Delhi, India
		Report		Stadium: Major Dhyan Chand National Stadium

3 October 2005 Group stage	Australia	2–1	Malaysia	New Delhi, India
	Hudson 2'; Arrold 31'	Report	Siti 60'	Stadium: Major Dhyan Chand National Stadium

5 October 2005 Group stage	Australia	4–1	Italy	New Delhi, India
	Taylor 3'; Hudson 19'; Skirving 33', 37'	Report	66'	Stadium: Major Dhyan Chand National Stadium

7 October 2005 Group stage	India	0–2	Australia	New Delhi, India
		Report	Rivers 31', 64'	Stadium: Major Dhyan Chand National Stadium

8 October 2005 Final	Australia	2–2 (5–3 p)	India	New Delhi, India
	Hudson 56'; Patrick 59'	Report	Mamta 64'; Jaskeer 28'	Stadium: Major Dhyan Chand National Stadium

==== IV Oceania Cup ====
29 October 2005 Match 1	New Zealand	1–0	Australia	Auckland, New Zealand
	Dillon 39'	Report		Stadium: Lloyd Elsmore Hockey Stadium

3 November 2005 Match 2	Australia	4–0	New Zealand	Sydney, Australia
	Blyth 45'; K. Smith 49'; Halliday 57'; Skirving 67'	Report		Stadium: Sydney Olympic Park

5 November 2005 Match 3	Australia	2–0	New Zealand	Sydney, Australia
	Alcorn 27'; Faulkner 40'	Report		Stadium: Sydney Olympic Park

==== Argentina test series ====
20 November 2005 Test match	Australia	3–1	Argentina	Canberra, Australia
	Skirving 40', 45'; Johnson 52'	Report	Gulla 4'	Stadium: National Hockey Centre

22 November 2005 Test match	Australia	5–2	Argentina	Canberra, Australia
	Skirving 10'; Arrold 30'; Hudson 42'; Halliday 53'; Walker 57'	Report		Stadium: National Hockey Centre

==== XIII FIH Champions Trophy ====
26 November 2005 Group stage	Australia	2–0	Germany	Canberra, Australia
15:00	Sanders 6'; Hudson 45'	Report		Stadium: National Hockey Centre

27 November 2005 Group stage	South Korea	0–2	Australia	Canberra, Australia
15:00		Report	Smith 42'; Hudson 63'	Stadium: National Hockey Centre

29 November 2005 Group stage	Australia	1–0	China	Canberra, Australia
18:00	Skirving 45'	Report		Stadium: National Hockey Centre

1 December 2005 Group stage	Argentina	1–1	Australia	Canberra, Australia
20:00	Gulla 7'	Report	Blyth 61'	Stadium: National Hockey Centre

3 December 2005 Group stage	Australia	3–1	Netherlands	Canberra, Australia
15:00	Blyth 11'; Sanders 55'; Skirving 63'	Report	Karres 12'	Stadium: National Hockey Centre

4 December 2005 Gold Medal Match	Australia	0–0 (4–5 p)	Netherlands	Canberra, Australia
15:00		Report		Stadium: National Hockey Centre
	Penalties
	Arrold (penalty shoot-out scored); Skirving (penalty shoot-out missed); Hudson (penalty shoot-out scored); Halliday (penalty shoot-out scored); Sanders (penalty shoot-out scored) ——— Arrold (penalty shoot-out missed)		(penalty shoot-out scored) Paumen; (penalty shoot-out missed) Schopman; (penalty shoot-out scored) Lammers; (penalty shoot-out scored) Moreira de Melo; (penalty shoot-out scored) Goderie ——— (penalty shoot-out scored) Paumen
