= 2002 Women's Hockey International Challenge =

Women's field hockey tournament which ran from 13–23 June 2002

Women's International Challenge
Tournament details
- Host country: Australia
- Dates: 13–23 June
- Teams: 4 (from 2 confederations)
- Venue: 2 (in 2 host cities)

Final positions
- Champions: South Korea (1st title)
- Runner-up: Australia
- Third place: Japan

Tournament statistics
- Matches played: 14
- Goals scored: 40 (2.86 per match)
- Top scorer: (Australia) Julie Towers (4 goals)

The 2002 Women's Hockey International Challenge was a women's field hockey tournament, consisting of a series of test matches. It was held in Perth and Sydney, from 13 to 23 June 2002.

South Korea won the tournament after defeating Australia 1–0 in the final. Japan finished in third place after defeating the Australian Institute of Sport 3–1 in the third place playoff.

== Competition format ==
The tournament featured the national teams of Australia, Japan and South Korea, as well as a team from the Australian Institute of Sport. The teams competed in a double round-robin format, with each team playing each other twice. Three points were awarded for a win, one for a draw, and none for a loss.

== Squads ==
Australia

Head Coach: David Bell

2. Louise Dobson
3. Karen Smith
5. Ngaire Smith
6. Bianca Langham-Pritchard
7. Peta Gallagher
10. Bianca Netzler
11. Emily Halliday
12. Brooke Morrison
13. Wendy Alcorn
17. Rachel Imison (GK)
20. Carmel Bakurski
21. Nina Bonner (GK)
23. Joanne Banning
25. Melanie Twitt
28. Julie Towers
29. Tammy Cole
30. Sarah Taylor
31. Katrina Powell (C)
Australian Institute of Sport
1. Toni Cronk (GK)
3. Jessica Monkivitch
4. Kimberley Robards
5. Elisabeth Paget
6. Megan Rivers
8. Susannah Harris
9. Shayni Buswell
10. Leanne Hammond
11. Renae Holmes
14. Nicole Arrold (C)
15. Denise Durajski
16. Cindy Morgan (GK)
17. Katrina Paterson
18. Emma Meyer
19. Donna-Lee Patrick
20. Natalie Willims
21. Jayde Taylor
27. Suzanne Faulkner
Japan

Head Coach: Akihiro Kuga

1. Rie Terazono (GK)
2. Keiko Miura (C)
3. Ikuko Matsuyama
4. Yukari Yamamoto
5. Sachimi Iwao
6. Chie Kimura
7. Yuka Ogura
8. Sakae Morimoto
9. Kaori Chiba
10. Naoko Saito
11. Toshie Tsukui
12. Nami Miyazaki (GK)
13. Misato Yasue
14. Akiko Kitada
15. Emi Sakurai
16. Mayumi Ono
17. Asuka Chiba
South Korea

Head Coach: Lim Heung-Sin

1. Park Yong-Sook (GK)
2. Kim Yun-Mi
3. Lee Jin-Hee
4. Yoo Hee-Joo
5. Lee Seon-Ok
6. Ki Sook-Hyun
7. Kim Eun-Jin
8. Lee Mi-Seong
10. Oh Ko-Woon
11. Kim Seong-Eun
12. Kim Jin-Kyoung
13. Jo Jin-Ju
15. Lee Eun-Young (C)
16. Lim Ju-Lyoung (GK)
18. Park Jeong-Sook
19. Kang Na-Young
20. Kim Jung-Hee
21. Choi Su-Yun

== Results ==
=== Preliminary round ===
==== Pool ====
Pos	Team	Pld	W	D	L	GF	GA	GD	Pts	Qualification
1	Australia	6	6	0	0	20	6	+14	18	Advanced to Final
2	South Korea	6	2	2	2	6	6	0	8	Advanced to Final
3	Australian Institute of Sport	6	1	1	4	3	9	−6	4	
4	Japan	6	1	1	4	6	14	−8	4	

Source: Hockey Australia
Rules for classification: 1) points; 2) goal difference; 3) goals scored; 4) head-to-head result.

==== Fixtures ====
13 June 2002
18:00 (AWST)

Japan	1–0	Australian Institute of Sport
Matsayama 65'	Report

Perth Hockey Stadium, Perth
Umpires:
Lee Mi-Ok (KOR)
Gina Spitaleri (ITA)

13 June 2002
20:00 (AWST)

Australia	2–1	South Korea
Netzler 39'; N. Smith 63'	Report	Kim E. 55'

Perth Hockey Stadium, Perth
Umpires:
Chieko Akiyama (JPN)
Sarah Garnett (NZL)

14 June 2002
18:00 (AWST)

Australian Institute of Sport	0–1	South Korea
	Report	Lee E. 56'

Perth Hockey Stadium, Perth
Umpires:
Gina Spitaleri (ITA)
Chieko Akiyama (JPN)

14 June 2002
20:00 (AWST)

Japan	1–5	Australia
Iwao 35'	Report	K. Smith 10', 67'; Dobson 14'; Morrison 28'; Banning 60'

Perth Hockey Stadium, Perth
Umpires:
Lee Mi-Ok (KOR)
Sarah Garnett (NZL)

16 June 2002
13:00 (AWST)

Australia	3–0	Australian Institute of Sport
Towers 16'; Netzler 18'; Gallagher 35'	Report

Perth Hockey Stadium, Perth
Umpires:
Gina Spitaleri (ITA)
Chieko Akiyama (JPN)

16 June 2002
15:00 (AWST)

South Korea	2–1	Japan
Kim E. 39'; Lee S. 54'	Report	Miura 41'

Perth Hockey Stadium, Perth
Umpires:
Minka Woolley (AUS)
Judith Barnesby (AUS)

19 June 2002
18:00 (AEST)

South Korea	0–0	Australian Institute of Sport
	Report

Sydney Olympic Park, Sydney
Umpires:
Chieko Akiyama (JPN)
Gina Spitaleri (ITA)

19 June 2002
20:00 (AEST)

Australia	4–2	Japan
Gallagher 19'; Powell 25'; Towers 35'; K. Smith 51'	Report	Morimoto 15'; Yasue 62'

Sydney Olympic Park, Sydney
Umpires:
Lee Mi-Ok (KOR)
Sarah Garnett (NZL)

20 June 2002
18:00 (AEST)

Japan	1–1	South Korea
Saito 35'	Report	Oh 69'

Sydney Olympic Park, Sydney
Umpires:
Judith Barnesby (AUS)
Minka Woolley (AUS)

20 June 2002
20:00 (AEST)

Australian Institute of Sport	1–4	Australia
Harris 53'	Report	N. Smith 28'; Dobson 33'; Powell 40'; Alcorn 67'

Sydney Olympic Park, Sydney
Umpires:
Chieko Akiyama (JPN)
Gina Spitaleri (ITA)

22 June 2002
13:00 (AEST)

Australian Institute of Sport	2–0	Japan
Hammond 49'; Faulkner 68'	Report

Sydney Olympic Park, Sydney
Umpires:
Gina Spitaleri (ITA)
Lee Mi-Ok (KOR)

22 June 2002
15:00 (AEST)

South Korea	1–2	Australia
Kim E. 23'	Report	Towers 12', 69'

Sydney Olympic Park, Sydney
Umpires:
Sarah Garnett (NZL)
Chieko Akiyama (JPN)

=== Classification round ===
==== Third and fourth place ====
23 June 2002
13:00 (AEST)

Australian Institute of Sport	1–3	Japan
Hammond 19'	Report	Miura 2'; Morimoto 39'; Ogura 43'

Sydney Olympic Park, Sydney
Umpires:
Sarah Garnett (NZL)
Lee Mi-Ok (KOR)

==== Final ====
23 June 2002
15:00 (AEST)

Australia	0–1	South Korea
	Report	Lee S. 45'

Sydney Olympic Park, Sydney
Umpires:
Chieko Akiyama (JPN)
Gina Spitaleri (ITA)

== Awards ==
Top Goalscorer	Player of the Final
(Australia) Julie Towers	(South Korea) Kim Seong-Eun

== Statistics ==
=== Final standings ===
As per statistical convention in field hockey, matches decided in extra time are counted as wins and losses, while matches decided by penalty shoot-outs are counted as draws.

Pos	Team	Pld	W	D	L	GF	GA	GD	Pts	Status
1st place, gold medalist(s)	South Korea	7	3	2	2	7	6	+1	11	Tournament Champion
2nd place, silver medalist(s)	Australia	7	6	0	1	20	7	+13	18	
3rd place, bronze medalist(s)	Japan	7	2	1	4	9	15	−6	7	
4	Australian Institute of Sport	7	1	1	5	4	12	−8	4	

Source: Hockey Australia

=== Goalscorers ===
There were 40 goals scored in 14 matches, for an average of 2.86 goals per match.

4 goals

- (Australia) Julie Towers

3 goals

- (Australia) Karen Smith
- (South Korea) Kim Eun-Jin

2 goals

- (Australia) Louise Dobson
- (Australia) Peta Gallagher
- (Australia) Bianca Netzler
- (Australia) Katrina Powell
- (Australia) Ngaire Smith
- Leanne Hammond
- (Japan) Keiko Miura
- (Japan) Sakae Morimoto
- (South Korea) Lee Seon-Ok

1 goal

- (Australia) Wendy Alcorn
- (Australia) Joanne Banning
- (Australia) Brooke Morrison
- Suzanne Faulkner
- Susannah Harris
- (Japan) Sachimi Iwao
- (Japan) Ikuko Matsayama
- (Japan) Yuka Ogura
- (Japan) Misato Yasue
- (Japan) Naoko Saito
- (South Korea) Oh Ko-Woon
