= 2004 Women's Australian Hockey League =

Tournament details
- Host country: Australia
- City: Perth
- Dates: 2–14 March
- Teams: 8
- Venue: Perth Hockey Stadium

Final positions
- Champions: (Western Australia) WA Diamonds (2nd title)
- Runner-up: (Australian Capital Territory) Canberra Strikers
- Third place: (Queensland) QLD Scorchers

Tournament statistics
- Matches played: 36
- Goals scored: 128 (3.56 per match)
- Top scorer: (Queensland) Hope Brown (6 goals)
- Best player: (Australian Capital Territory) Sarah Taylor (Western Australia) Emily Halliday

The 2004 Women's Australian Hockey League was the 12th edition women's field hockey tournament. The tournament was held in Perth from 2–14 March 2004.

WA Diamonds won the tournament for the second time after defeating Canberra Strikers 2–1 in the final. QLD Scorchers finished in third place after defeating NSWIS Arrows 2–0 in the third and fourth place playoff.

== Participating teams ==
- (Australian Capital Territory) Canberra Strikers
- (New South Wales) NSWIS Arrows
- (Northern Territory) Territory Pearls
- (Queensland) QLD Scorchers
- (South Australia) Adelaide Suns
- (Tasmania) Tassie Van Demons
- (Victoria (state)) VIS Vipers
- (Western Australia) WA Diamonds

== Competition format ==
The 2004 Women's Australian Hockey League consisted of a single round robin format, followed by classification matches.

Teams from all 8 states and territories competed against one another throughout the pool stage. At the conclusion of the pool stage, the top four ranked teams progressed to the semi-finals, while the bottom four teams continued to the classification stage.

=== Point allocation ===
All matches had an outright result, meaning drawn matches were decided in either golden goal extra time, or a penalty shoot-out. Match points were as follows:

· 3 points for a win
· 1 points to each team in the event of a draw
· 1 point will be awarded to the winner of the shoot-out
· 0 points to the loser of the match

== Results ==
- All times are local (AWST).

=== Preliminary round ===
Pos	Team	Pld	W	WD	LD	L	GF	GA	GD	Pts	Qualification
1	(Australian Capital Territory) Canberra Strikers	7	4	2	0	1	15	5	+10	16	Semi-finals
2	(Queensland) QLD Scorchers	7	4	1	2	0	21	5	+16	16	Semi-finals
3	(Western Australia) WA Diamonds	7	5	0	1	1	14	8	+6	16	Semi-finals
4	(New South Wales) NSWIS Arrows	7	4	1	0	2	13	7	+6	14	Semi-finals
5	(Victoria (state)) VIS Vipers	7	3	0	0	4	12	14	−2	9	
6	(South Australia) Adelaide Suns	7	2	0	1	4	13	15	−2	7	
7	(Tasmania) Tassie Van Demons	7	2	0	0	5	7	23	−16	6	
8	(Northern Territory) Territory Pearls	7	0	0	0	7	2	20	−18	0	

Source: Clearing House
Rules for classification: 1) points; 2) head-to-head result; 3) goal difference; 4) matches won; 5) goals scored.

==== Fixtures ====
2 March 2004
14:00

Canberra Strikers (Australian Capital Territory)	3–1	(South Australia) Adelaide Suns
Taylor 19'; Nightingale 42'; Powell 57'	Report	Bakurski 13'

Umpires:
Julie Ashton-Lucy (AUS)
Angela Holloway (AUS)

2 March 2004
16:00

VIS Vipers (Victoria (state))	1–5	(Queensland) QLD Scorchers
Johnston 31'	Report	Faulkner 14'; K. Smith 19', 48'; Korner 28'; Holmes 46'

Umpires:
Lisa Roach (AUS)
Melissa Trivic (AUS)

2 March 2004
18:00

Territory Pearls (Northern Territory)	0–3	(Western Australia) WA Diamonds
	Report	Halliday 18'; Buswell 50'; Smithson 55'

Umpires:
Peri Buckley (AUS)
Sharni Power (AUS)

2 March 2004
20:00

Tassie Van Demons (Tasmania)	0–4	(New South Wales) NSWIS Arrows
	Report	Towers 18'; Burke 21'; Harris 22'; Rivers 57'

Umpires:
Lynn Cowie-McAlister (AUS)
Annette Crandell (AUS)

3 March 2004
14:00

Territory Pearls (Northern Territory)	1–2	(Queensland) QLD Scorchers
Cameron 62'	Report	Holmes 38'; Faulkner 63'

Umpires:
Angela Holloway (AUS)
Alison Gowan (AUS)

3 March 2004
16:00

Adelaide Suns (South Australia)	0–1	(New South Wales) NSWIS Arrows
	Report	Netzler 26'

Umpires:
Lynn Cowie-McAlister (AUS)
Peri Buckley (AUS)

3 March 2004
18:00

Tassie Van Demons (Tasmania)	0–4	(Australian Capital Territory) Canberra Strikers
	Report	Cornish 2'; Arrold 33'; Powell 65'; Gallagher 67'

Umpires:
Melissa Trivic (AUS)
Sharni Power (AUS)

3 March 2004
20:00

VIS Vipers (Victoria (state))	1–2	(Western Australia) WA Diamonds
Joseph 53'	Report	Buswell 17'; Morrison 51'

Umpires:
Penny Brown (AUS)
Annette Crandell (AUS)

5 March 2004
14:00

Tassie Van Demons (Tasmania)	2–3	(South Australia) Adelaide Suns
Hamahona 23', 59'	Report	Marles 14', 17'; Pickett 64'

Umpires:
Penny Brown (AUS)
Alison Gowan (AUS)

5 March 2004
16:00

VIS Vipers (Victoria (state))	4–0	(Northern Territory) Territory Pearls
Durajski 7', 44'; Chau 35'; Dobson 50'	Report

Umpires:
Lynn Cowie-McAlister (AUS)
Sharni Power (AUS)

5 March 2004
18:00

WA Diamonds (Western Australia)	0–1	(Queensland) QLD Scorchers
	Report	Brown 16'

Umpires:
Lisa Roach (AUS)
Peri Buckley (AUS)

5 March 2004
20:00

Canberra Strikers (Australian Capital Territory)	2–1	(New South Wales) NSWIS Arrows
Taylor 3'; Arrold 60'	Report	Netzler 47'

Umpires:
Julie Ashton-Lucy (AUS)
Annette Crandell (AUS)

7 March 2004
10:00

VIS Vipers (Victoria (state))	1–3	(Tasmania) Tassie Van Demons
Johnston 43'	Report	Carr 22'; Paget 57', 61'

Umpires:
Julie Ashton-Lucy (AUS)
Penny Brown (AUS)

7 March 2004
12:00

Territory Pearls (Northern Territory)	0–4	(South Australia) Adelaide Suns
	Report	Bakurski 25', 33'; Cibich 41', 67'

Umpires:
Angela Holloway (AUS)
Lisa Roach (AUS)

7 March 2004
14:00

WA Diamonds (Western Australia)	2–3 (a.e.t.)	(Australian Capital Territory) Canberra Strikers
Halliday 28'; Morrison 53'	Report	Gallagher 3', 10'; Powell 73'

Umpires:
Lynn Cowie-McAlister (AUS)
Alison Gowie (AUS)

7 March 2004
16:00

QLD Scorchers (Queensland)	2–2	(New South Wales) NSWIS Arrows
Brown 14'; Faulkner 55'	Report	Brooks 26'; Netzler 58'
Penalties
Faulkner (penalty shoot-out scored); Smith (penalty shoot-out scored); Paterson (penalty shoot-out scored); Meyer (penalty shoot-out missed); Attard (penalty shoot-out missed)	3–4	(penalty shoot-out scored) Sanders; (penalty shoot-out scored) Towers; (penalty shoot-out missed) Commens; (penalty shoot-out scored) Netzler; (penalty shoot-out scored) Banning

Umpires:
Melissa Trivic (AUS)
Peri Buckley (AUS)

8 March 2004
14:00

QLD Scorchers (Queensland)	9–0	(Tasmania) Tassie Van Demons
Faulkner 3'; Pamenter 18', 55'; Brown 25', 69', 70'; Blyth 43', 61'; K. Smith 65'	Report

Umpires:
Sharni Power (AUS)
Alison Gowan (AUS)

8 March 2004
16:00

VIS Vipers (Victoria (state))	0–2	(New South Wales) NSWIS Arrows
	Report	Banning 32'; Netzler 59'

Umpires:
Julie Ashton-Lucy (AUS)
Angela Holloway (AUS)

8 March 2004
18:00

Territory Pearls (Northern Territory)	0–3	(Australian Capital Territory) Canberra Strikers
	Report	Taylor 6', 52'; Rayner 31'

Umpires:
Melissa Trivic (AUS)
Penny Brown (AUS)

8 March 2004
20:00

WA Diamonds (Western Australia)	3–2	(South Australia) Adelaide Suns
Halliday 19'; Smithson 41', 47'	Report	Pickett 3'; Anderson 12'

Umpires:
Annette Crandell (AUS)
Lisa Roach (AUS)

10 March 2004
14:00

VIS Vipers (Victoria (state))	4–2	(South Australia) Adelaide Suns
Smith 26'; Joseph 58', 63'; Chau 59'	Report	Cibich 13'; Bakurski 14'

Umpires:
Peri Buckley (AUS)
Angela Holloway (AUS)

10 March 2004
16:00

Tassie Van Demons (Tasmania)	2–1	(Northern Territory) Territory Pearls
Young 31'; Jones 35'	Report	Caden 40'

Umpires:
Lynn Cowie-McAlister (AUS)
Alison Gowan (AUS)

10 March 2004
18:00

WA Diamonds (Western Australia)	3–1	(New South Wales) NSWIS Arrows
Mansell 15'; Halliday 29'; Dwyer 59'	Report	Sanders 24'

Umpires:
Julie Ashton-Lucy (AUS)
Annette Crandell (AUS)

10 March 2004
20:00

QLD Scorchers (Queensland)	0–0	(Australian Capital Territory) Canberra Strikers
	Report
Penalties
Faulkner (penalty shoot-out scored); Smith (penalty shoot-out scored); Attard (penalty shoot-out scored); Boland (penalty shoot-out scored); Blyth (penalty shoot-out missed)	4–5	(penalty shoot-out scored) Jennings; (penalty shoot-out scored) Arrold; (penalty shoot-out scored) Gallagher; (penalty shoot-out scored) Taylor; (penalty shoot-out scored) Ditton

Umpires:
Lisa Roach (AUS)
Melissa Trivic (AUS)

11 March 2004
14:00

Territory Pearls (Northern Territory)	0–2	(New South Wales) NSWIS Arrows
	Report	Simpson 25'; White-Muik 45'

Umpires:
Melissa Trivic (AUS)
Angela Holloway (AUS)

11 March 2004
16:00

QLD Scorchers (Queensland)	2–1 (a.e.t.)	(South Australia) Adelaide Suns
Brown 25'; Holmes 72'	Report	Patrick 6'

Umpires:
Peri Buckley (AUS)
Penny Brown (AUS)

11 March 2004
18:00

VIS Vipers (Victoria (state))	1–0	(Australian Capital Territory) Canberra Strikers
Joseph 37'	Report

Umpires:
Julie Ashton-Lucy (AUS)
Annette Crandell (AUS)

11 March 2004
20:00

WA Diamonds (Western Australia)	1–0	(Tasmania) Tassie Van Demons
Smithson 11'	Report

Umpires:
Lisa Roach (AUS)
Lynn Cowie-McAlister (AUS)

=== Classification round ===
==== Fifth to eighth place classification ====
Crossover
13 March 2004
(Victoria (state)) VIS Vipers	2
(Northern Territory) Territory Pearls (a.e.t)	3
13 March 2004
(South Australia) Adelaide Suns	5
(Tasmania) Tassie Van Demons	0

Fifth Place
14 March 2004
(Northern Territory) Territory Pearls (a.e.t)	2
(South Australia) Adelaide Suns	1
Seventh Place
14 March 2004
(Victoria (state)) VIS Vipers	3
(Tasmania) Tassie Van Demons	1

===== Crossover =====
13 March 2004
09:00

Azuma Vipers (Victoria (state))	2–3 (a.e.t.)	(Northern Territory) Territory Pearls
Durajski 60'; Johnston 67'	Report	Clarke 20'; Caden 56'; Kazakoff 76'

Umpires:
Alison Gowan (AUS)
Annette Crandell (AUS)

13 March 2004
09:30

Adelaide Suns (South Australia)	5–0	(Tasmania) Tassie Van Demons
Bakurski 24'; Cargill 35'; Pickett 49'; Militz 58'; Shakes 61'	Report

Umpires:
Penny Brown (AUS)
Melissa Trivic (AUS)

===== Seventh and eighth place =====
14 March 2004
08:30

Azuma Vipers (Victoria (state))	3–1	(Tasmania) Tassie Van Demons
Durajski 30'; Dobson 58'; Brazenor 65'	Report	Hamahona 10'

Umpires:
Alison Gowan (AUS)
Sharni Power (AUS)

===== Fifth and sixth place =====
14 March 2004
09:00

Territory Pearls (Northern Territory)	2–1 (a.e.t.)	(South Australia) Adelaide Suns
Ramshaw 17'; Bain 72'	Report	Pickett 34'

Umpires:
Angela Holloway (AUS)
Lynn Cowie-McAlister (AUS)

==== First to fourth place classification ====
Semi-finals
13 March 2004
(Australian Capital Territory) Canberra Strikers	3
(New South Wales) NSWIS Arrows	2
13 March 2004
(Queensland) QLD Scorchers	2 (3)
(Western Australia) WA Diamonds (pen.)	2 (4)

Final
14 March 2004
(Australian Capital Territory) Canberra Strikers	1
(Western Australia) WA Diamonds	2
Third Place
14 March 2004
(New South Wales) NSWIS Arrows	0
(Queensland) QLD Scorchers	2

===== Semi-finals =====
13 March 2004
11:00

Canberra Strikers (Australian Capital Territory)	3–2	(New South Wales) NSWIS Arrows
Powell 12'; Mihailou 34'; Taylor 49'	Report	Netzler 4'; Simpson 20'

Umpires:
Julie Ashton-Lucy (AUS)
Lynn Cowie-McAlister (AUS)

13 March 2004
13:00

QLD Scorchers (Queensland)	2–2	(Western Australia) WA Diamonds
Holmes 23', 69'	Report	Morrison 44'; Liddelow 54'
Penalties
Faulkner (penalty shoot-out scored); Brown (penalty shoot-out scored); Smith (penalty shoot-out missed); Attard (penalty shoot-out scored); Paterson (penalty shoot-out missed) —— Faulkner (penalty shoot-out missed)	3–4	(penalty shoot-out missed) Buswell; (penalty shoot-out missed) Dwyer; (penalty shoot-out scored) Morrison; (penalty shoot-out scored) Mansell; (penalty shoot-out scored) Halliday —— (penalty shoot-out scored) Morrison

Umpires:
Lisa Roach (AUS)
Peri Buckley (AUS)

===== Third and fourth place =====
14 March 2004
10:30

NSWIS Arrows (New South Wales)	0–2	(Queensland) QLD Scorchers
	Report	Alcorn 26'; Faulkner 53'

Umpires:
Melissa Trivic (AUS)
Annette Crandell (AUS)

===== Final =====
14 March 2004
12:30

Canberra Strikers (Australian Capital Territory)	1–2	(Western Australia) WA Diamonds
Powell 61'	Report	Mansell 17', 41'

Umpires:
Lisa Roach (AUS)
Julie Ashton-Lucy (AUS)

== Awards ==
Players of the Tournament	Top Goalscorer	Player of the Final
(Australian Capital Territory) Sarah Taylor (Western Australia) Emily Halliday	(Queensland) Hope Brown	(Western Australia) Emily Halliday

== Statistics ==
=== Final standings ===
Pos	Team	Pld	W	WD	LD	L	GF	GA	GD	Pts	Qualification
1st place, gold medalist(s)	(Western Australia) WA Diamonds	9	6	1	1	1	18	11	+7	21	Gold Medal
2nd place, silver medalist(s)	(Australian Capital Territory) Canberra Strikers	9	5	2	0	2	19	9	+10	19	Silver Medal
3rd place, bronze medalist(s)	(Queensland) QLD Scorchers	9	5	1	3	0	25	7	+18	20	Bronze Medal
4	(New South Wales) NSWIS Arrows	9	4	1	0	4	15	12	+3	14	
5	(Northern Territory) Territory Pearls	9	0	2	0	7	7	23	−16	4	
6	(South Australia) Adelaide Suns	9	3	0	2	4	19	17	+2	11	
7	(Victoria (state)) VIS Vipers	9	4	0	1	4	17	18	−1	13	
8	(Tasmania) Tassie Van Demons	9	2	0	0	7	8	31	−23	6	

Source: Clearing House

=== Goalscorers ===
There were 128 goals scored in 36 matches, for an average of 3.56 goals per match.

6 goals

- (Queensland) Hope Brown

5 goals

- (Australian Capital Territory) Katrina Powell
- (Australian Capital Territory) Sarah Taylor
- (New South Wales) Bianca Netzler
- (Queensland) Suzanne Faulkner
- (Queensland) Renae Holmes
- (South Australia) Carmel Bakurski

4 goals

- (South Australia) Bronte Pickett
- (Victoria (state)) Denise Durajski
- (Victoria (state)) Stacia Joseph
- (Western Australia) Emily Halliday
- (Western Australia) Sian Smithson

3 goals

- (Australian Capital Territory) Peta Gallagher
- (Queensland) Karen Smith
- (South Australia) Jessica Cibich
- (Tasmania) Piki Hamahona
- (Victoria (state)) Tamsin Johnston
- (Western Australia) Kia Mansell
- (Western Australia) Brooke Morrison

2 goals

- (Australian Capital Territory) Nicole Arrold
- (New South Wales) Molly Simpson
- (Northern Territory) Michelle Caden
- (Queensland) Madonna Blyth
- (Queensland) Lisa Pamenter
- (South Australia) Mignon Marles
- (Tasmania) Lis Paget
- (Victoria (state)) Kary Chau
- (Victoria (state)) Louise Dobson
- (Western Australia) Shayni Buswell

1 goal

- (Australian Capital Territory) Sarah Cornish
- (Australian Capital Territory) Michaela Mihailou
- (Australian Capital Territory) Emily Nightingale
- (Australian Capital Territory) Kali Rayner
- (New South Wales) Joanne Banning
- (New South Wales) Hannah Burke
- (New South Wales) Belinda Brooks
- (New South Wales) Susannah Harris
- (New South Wales) Megan Rivers
- (New South Wales) Rebecca Sanders
- (New South Wales) Julie Towers
- (New South Wales) Nicole White-Muik
- (Northern Territory) Shannon Bain
- (Northern Territory) Jemima Cameron
- (Northern Territory) Emmanuelle Clarke
- (Northern Territory) Larissa Kazakoff
- (Northern Territory) Rachel Ramshaw
- (Queensland) Wendy Alcorn
- (Queensland) Amy Korner
- (South Australia) Rebecca Anderson
- (South Australia) Heather Cargill
- (South Australia) Rachel Militz
- (South Australia) Donna-Lee Patrick
- (South Australia) Jessica Shakes
- (Tasmania) Isabel Carr
- (Tasmania) Jacqueline Jones
- (Tasmania) Fiona Young
- (Victoria (state)) Adele Brazenor
- (Victoria (state)) Ngaire Smith
- (Western Australia) Stephanie Dwyer
- (Western Australia) Shelly Liddelow

Source: Clearing House
