= 2004 ANZ Women's Hockey Challenge =

Hockey

ANZ Hockey Challenge
Tournament details
- Host country: Australia
- Dates: 16–27 June
- Teams: 4 (from 2 confederations)
- Venue: 2 (in 2 host cities)

Tournament statistics
- Matches played: 16
- Goals scored: 67 (4.19 per match)
- Top scorer: (Australia) Suzanne Faulkner (8 goals)

The 2004 Women's ANZ Hockey Challenge was a women's field hockey event, comprising two four–nations tournaments. It was held in Darwin and Townsville, from 16 to 27 June 2004.

Australia won both tournaments, defeating New Zealand and Japan in the respective finals.

== Competition format ==
The tournament featured the national teams of Australia, Japan and New Zealand, as well as a team from the Australian Institute of Sport. The teams competed in a double round-robin format, with each team playing each other twice. Three points were awarded for a win, one for a draw, and none for a loss.

== Darwin ==
Tournament details
- City: Darwin
- Dates: 16–20 June
- Venue: Vodafone Hockey Centre

Final positions
- Champions: Australia
- Runner-up: New Zealand
- Third place: Japan

Tournament statistics
- Matches played: 8
- Goals scored: 43 (5.38 per match)
- Top scorer: (Australia) Suzanne Faulkner (5 goals)

All times are local (ACST).

=== Preliminary round ===
==== Pool ====
Pos	Team	Pld	W	D	L	GF	GA	GD	Pts	Qualification
1	Australia	3	3	0	0	15	4	+11	9	Advanced to Final
2	New Zealand	3	2	0	1	10	8	+2	6	Advanced to Final
3	Japan	3	1	0	2	8	11	−3	3	
4	Australian Institute of Sport	3	0	0	3	4	14	−10	0	

Source: Hockey Australia
Rules for classification: 1) points; 2) goal difference; 3) goals scored; 4) head-to-head result.

==== Fixtures ====
16 June 2004
18:00

Japan	6–3	Australian Institute of Sport
Miura 8'; Saito 13'; Iwao 17', 43'; Komazawa 50'; Morimoto 54'	Report	Harris 44'; Buswell 56'; Alcorn 70+'

Umpires:
Lyn Farrell (NZL)
Minka Woolley (AUS)

16 June 2004
20:00

Australia	6–3	New Zealand
Dobson 13'; Faulkner 27', 49'; Towers 35'; K. Smith 58'; Bakurski 67'	Report	Walton 7', 22'; Provan 31'

Umpires:
Lisette Klaassen (NED)
Sachiko Fukuda (JPN)

17 June 2004
18:00

Australian Institute of Sport	0–4	Australia
	Report	N. Smith 9'; Arrold 13'; Faulkner 16'; Dobson 19'

Umpires:
Sachiko Fukuda (JPN)
Lyn Farrell (NZL)

17 June 2004
20:00

New Zealand	3–1	Japan
Orr 6'; Roberts-Lang 50'; Carr 54'	Report	Morimoto 33'

Umpires:
Minka Woolley (AUS)
Lisa Roach (AUS)

19 June 2004
15:00

Australia	5–1	Japan
Netzler 8', 48'; Faulkner 45'; N. Smith 56', 63'	Report	Morimoto 16'

Umpires:
Lyn Farrell (NZL)
Lisette Klaassen (NED)

19 June 2004
17:00

Australian Institute of Sport	1–4	New Zealand
Patrick 45'	Report	Walton 10', 19'; Provan 35'; Roberts-Lang 63'

Umpires:
Lisa Roach (AUS)
Sachiko Fukuda (JPN)

=== Classification round ===
==== Third and fourth place ====
20 June 2004
15:00

Japan	2–0	Australian Institute of Sport
Nakagawa 30'; Komazawa 60'	Report

Umpires:
Lisette Klaassen (NED)
Lisa Roach (AUS)

==== Final ====
20 June 2004
17:00

Australia	4–0	New Zealand
Dobson 5'; Towers 27'; Faulkner 30'; Powell 32'	Report

Umpires:
Lyn Farrell (NZL)
Minka Woolley (AUS)

== Townsville ==
Tournament details
- City: Townsville
- Dates: 23–27 June
- Venue: Murray Sporting Complex

Final positions
- Champions: Australia
- Runner-up: Japan
- Third place: New Zealand

Tournament statistics
- Matches played: 8
- Goals scored: 24 (3 per match)
- Top scorer: (Australia) Suzanne Faulkner (3 goals)

All times are local (AEST).

=== Preliminary round ===
==== Pool ====
Pos	Team	Pld	W	D	L	GF	GA	GD	Pts	Qualification
1	Australia	3	3	0	0	10	1	+9	9	Advanced to Final
2	Japan	3	1	0	2	4	6	−2	3	Advanced to Final
3	New Zealand	3	1	0	2	2	4	−2	3	
4	Australian Institute of Sport	3	1	0	2	2	7	−5	3	

Source: Hockey Australia
Rules for classification: 1) points; 2) goal difference; 3) goals scored; 4) head-to-head result.

==== Fixtures ====
23 June 2004
18:00

New Zealand	1–0	Australian Institute of Sport
Muirhead 61'	Report

Umpires:
Sachiko Fukuda (JPN)
Lisa Roach (AUS)

23 June 2004
20:00

Japan	1–3	Australia
Nakagawa 18'	Report	Alcorn 6'; K. Smith 12'; N. Smith 44'

Umpires:
Lisette Klaassen (NED)
Lyn Farrell (NZL)

24 June 2004
18:00

Australia	5–0	Australian Institute of Sport
Faulkner 10', 49'; Powell 44'; Twitt 61', 67'	Report

Umpires:
Lyn Farrell (NZL)
Sachiko Fukuda (JPN)

24 June 2004
20:00

Japan	2–1	New Zealand
Saito 49'; Morimoto 61'	Report	Muirhead 26'

Umpires:
Lisa Roach (AUS)
Minka Woolley (AUS)

26 June 2004
15:00

New Zealand	0–2	Australia
	Report	Faulkner 3'; Towers 37'

Umpires:
Sachiko Fukuda (JPN)
Lisette Klaassen (NED)

26 June 2004
17:00

Australian Institute of Sport	2–1	Japan
Rivers 8'; Arrold 61'	Report	Komori 49'

Umpires:
Minka Woolley (AUS)
Lyn Farrell (NZL)

=== Classification round ===
==== Third and fourth place ====
27 June 2004
15:00

New Zealand	1–0	Australian Institute of Sport
Roberts-Lang 60'	Report

Umpires:
Lyn Farrell (NZL)
Lisette Klaassen (NED)

==== Final ====
27 June 2004
17:00

Australia	3–2 (a.e.t.)	Japan
N. Smith 22'; Towers 38'; Powell 74'	Report	Kitada 33'; Chiba 58'

Umpires:
Lisa Roach (AUS)
Sachiko Fukuda (JPN)

== Statistics ==
=== Final standings ===
As per statistical convention in field hockey, matches decided in extra time are counted as wins and losses, while matches decided by penalty shoot-outs are counted as draws.

Pos	Team	Pld	W	D	L	GF	GA	GD	Pts
1st place, gold medalist(s)	Australia	4	4	0	0	19	4	+15	12
2nd place, silver medalist(s)	New Zealand	4	2	0	2	10	12	−2	6
3rd place, bronze medalist(s)	Japan	4	2	0	2	10	11	−1	6
4	Australian Institute of Sport	4	0	0	4	4	16	−12	0

Source: Darwin

Pos	Team	Pld	W	D	L	GF	GA	GD	Pts
1st place, gold medalist(s)	Australia	4	4	0	0	13	3	+10	12
2nd place, silver medalist(s)	Japan	4	1	0	3	6	9	−3	3
3rd place, bronze medalist(s)	New Zealand	4	2	0	2	3	4	−1	6
4	Australian Institute of Sport	4	1	0	3	2	8	−6	3

Source: Townsville

=== Goalscorers ===
* Note: the following goalscorers list comprises players from both tournaments.

There were 67 goals scored in 16 matches, for an average of 4.19 goals per match.

8 goals

- (Australia) Suzanne Faulkner

5 goals

- (Australia) Ngaire Smith

4 goals

- (Australia) Julie Towers
- (Japan) Sakae Morimoto
- (New Zealand) Lisa Walton

3 goals

- (Australia) Louise Dobson
- (Australia) Katrina Powell
- (New Zealand) Niniwa Roberts-Lang

2 goals

- (Australia) + Wendy Alcorn
- (Australia) + Nicole Arrold
- (Australia) Bianca Netzler
- (Australia) Karen Smith
- (Australia) Melanie Twitt
- (Japan) Sachimi Iwao
- (Japan) Rika Komazawa
- (Japan) Miyuki Nakagawa
- (Japan) Naoko Saito
- (New Zealand) Suzanne Muirhead
- (New Zealand) Jaimee Provan

1 goal

- (Australia) Carmel Bakurski
- Shayni Buswell
- Susannah Harris
- Donna-Lee Patrick
- Megan Rivers
- (Japan) Kaori Chiba
- (Japan) Akiko Kitada
- (Japan) Tomomi Komori
- (Japan) Keiko Miura
- (New Zealand) Stacey Carr
- (New Zealand) Meredith Orr
