= 2003 Women's Oceania Cup =

Field hockey tournament

2003 Oceania Cup
Tournament details
- Host country: Australia; New Zealand
- Dates: 25–31 May
- Venue: 3 (in 3 host cities)

Final positions
- Champions: Australia (3rd title)
- Runner-up: New Zealand

Tournament statistics
- Matches played: 3
- Goals scored: 10 (3.33 per match)
- Top scorer: (Australia) Katrina Powell (4 goals)

The 2003 Women's Oceania Cup was the third edition of the women's field hockey tournament. It was held from 25 to 31 May in Melbourne, Wellington and Whangārei.

The tournament served as a qualifier for the 2004 Summer Olympics.

Australia won the tournament for the third time, defeating New Zealand in the three–game series, 3–0.

== Squads ==
Australia

Head Coach: David Bell

1. Toni Cronk (GK)
2. Louise Dobson
3. Karen Smith
5. Ngaire Smith
7. Peta Gallagher
10. Bianca Netzler
11. Emily Halliday
13. Wendy Alcorn
17. Rachel Imison (GK)
19. Donna-Lee Patrick
20. Carmel Bakurski
22. Katie Allen
24. Angela Skirving
25. Melanie Twitt
28. Julie Towers
30. Sarah Taylor
31. Katrina Powell (C)
32. Nicole Hudson
New Zealand
1. Kayla Sharland
2. Nicole Grimwood
3. Paula Enoka
4. Janet Rowsell
5. Rachel Sutherland
6. Meredith Orr
7. Piki Hamahona
8. Jaimee Provan
10. Elizabeth Igasan
14. Suzanne Pearce
16. Helen Clarke (GK, C)
17. Caryn Paewai
18. Diana Weavers
20. Amanda Christie
21. Niniwa Roberts-Lang
23. Tara Drysdale
26. Anita Wawatai (GK)
28. Karen Syddall

== Results ==
=== Pool ===
Pos	Team	Pld	W	D	L	GF	GA	GD	Pts	Qualification
1	Australia	3	3	0	0	10	0	+10	9	2004 Summer Olympics
2	New Zealand	3	0	0	3	0	10	−10	0	

Source: Clearing House
Rules for classification: 1) points; 2) goal difference; 3) goals scored; 4) head-to-head result.

=== Fixtures ===
25 May 2003
14:00 (AEST)

Australia	2–0	New Zealand
Skirving 6'; Towers 46'	Report

State Netball and Hockey Centre, Melbourne
Umpires:
Marelize de Klerk (RSA)
Kazuko Yasueda (JPN)

29 May 2003
18:30 (NZST)

New Zealand	0–2	Australia
	Report	Gallagher 15'; Powell 52'

Lloyd Elsmore Hockey Stadium, Auckland
Umpires:
Kazuko Yasueda (JPN)
Marelize de Klerk (RSA)

31 May 2003
13:15 (NZST)

New Zealand	0–6	Australia
	Report	Skirving 5'; Powell 15', 42', 54'; K. Smith 17'; N. Smith 64'

Northland Hockey Association, Whangārei
Umpires:
Marelize de Klerk (RSA)
Kazuko Yasueda (JPN)

== Statistics ==
=== Final standings ===
1. Australia
2. New Zealand

=== Goalscorers ===
There were 10 goals scored in 3 matches, for an average of 3.33 goals per match.

4 goals

- (Australia) Katrina Powell

2 goals

- (Australia) Angela Skirving

1 goal

- (Australia) Peta Gallagher
- (Australia) Karen Smith
- (Australia) Ngaire Smith
- (Australia) Julie Towers

Source: Hockey Australia
