= 2002 Women's Hockey Champions Trophy =

Field hockey tournament

Tournament details
- Host country: Macao
- City: Macau
- Teams: 6
- Venue: Macao Stadium

Final positions
- Champions: China (1st title)
- Runner-up: Argentina
- Third place: Netherlands

Tournament statistics
- Matches played: 18
- Goals scored: 49 (2.72 per match)
- Top scorer: (Argentina) Vanina Oneto (5 goals)
- Best player: (Argentina) Cecilia Rognoni

The 2002 Women's Hockey Champions Trophy was the 10th edition of the Hockey Champions Trophy for women. It was held from 24 August to 1 September 2002 in Macau, China, being this the first time that the annual six-nation tournament was staged in that country.

China won the tournament for the first time after defeating Argentina 3–1 in the final on penalty strokes after a 2–2 draw.

== Teams ==
The participating teams were determined by International Hockey Federation (FIH):

- Argentina (Defending champions)
- Australia (Champions of 2000 Summer Olympics and 1998 World Cup)
- China
- Netherlands (Third in 2000 Summer Olympics)
- New Zealand (Sixth in 2000 Summer Olympics)
- England (Eighth in 2000 Summer Olympics)

== Squads ==
Argentina

Head Coach: Sergio Vigil

1. Mariela Antoniska (GK)
2. Agustina García
3. Magdalena Aicega
4. María Paz Ferrari
5. Anabel Gambero
6. Ayelén Stepnik
8. Luciana Aymar
9. Vanina Oneto
11. Karina Masotta (c)
12. Mariana González Oliva
13. Laura Maiztegui
14. Mercedes Margalot
15. María de la Paz Hernández
16. Cecilia Rognoni
18. Paola Vukojicic (GK)
19. Mariné Russo
21. Inés Arrondo
24. Claudia Burkart
Australia

Head Coach: David Bell

1. Toni Cronk (GK)
2. Louise Dobson
3. Karen Smith
5. Ngaire Smith
7. Peta Gallagher
8. Shayni Buswell
13. Wendy Alcorn
14. Nicole Arrold
20. Carmel Bakurski
21. Nina Bonner (GK)
23. Joanne Banning
24. Angie Skirving
25. Melanie Twitt
26. Megan Sargeant
28. Julie Towers
29. Tammy Cole
31. Katrina Powell (c)
32. Nikki Hudson
China

Head Coach: Kim Chang-back

1. Nie Yali (GK)
2. Long Fengyu
3. Chen Zhaoxia
4. Ma Yibo
5. Cheng Hui
7. Huang Junxia
8. Fu Baorong
9. Li Shuang
11. Tang Chunling
12. Zhou Wanfeng
13. Zhang Hay Ying
15. Hou Xiaolan
18. Mai Shooyan
19. Chen Qiuqi
20. Wang Jiuyan
21. Zhang Shuang
22. Li Aili
31. Pan Fengzhen (GK)
England

Head Coach: Tricia Heberle

1. Anna Bennett
2. Jennie Bimson
3. Sarah Blanks
5. Melanie Clewlow
7. Helen Grant
8. Fiona Greenham
9. Leisa King
11. Purdy Miller
12. Mandy Nicholson
14. Anne Panter
15. Katy Roberts (GK)
17. Jane Smith
18. Rachel Walker
19. Kate Walsh
22. Alex Danson
25. Beth Storry (GK)
26. Frances Houslop
31. Rachel Walsh
Netherlands

Head Coach: Marc Lammers

1. Clarinda Sinnige (GK)
2. Lisanne de Roever (GK)
3. Macha van der Vaart
4. Fatima Moreira de Melo
6. Maartje Scheepstra
7. Miek van Geenhuizen
9. Florien Cornelis
10. Mijntje Donners (c)
11. Ageeth Boomgaardt
13. Minke Smabers
14. Ellis Verbakel
15. Janneke Schopman
16. Chantal de Bruijn
18. Minke Booij
21. Lieve van Kessel
23. Kim Lammers
24. Femke Kooijman
26. Fleur van de Kieft
New Zealand

Head Coach: Jan Borren

3. Paula Enoka
4. Sandy Bennett
5. Rachel Sutherland
7. Skippy Hamahona
8. Jaimee Provan
11. Michelle Turner
14. Suzie Pearce
15. Anne-Marie Irving (GK)
16. Helen Clarke (c, GK)
17. Caryn Paewai
18. Diana Weavers
20. Amanda Christie
21. Niniwa Roberts
23. Tara Drysdale
25. Lisa Bishop
27. Colleen Gubb-Suddaby
28. Karen Syddall
29. Kate Saunders

== Umpires ==
Below are the 9 umpires appointed by the International Hockey Federation:

- Chieko Akiyama (JPN)
- Renée Cohen (NED)
- Ute Conen (GER)
- Marelize de Klerk (RSA)
- Jean Duncan (SCO)
- Yao Hongjun (CHN)
- Jane Nockolds (ENG)
- Minka Woolley (AUS)
- Xiong Ru (CHN)

== Results ==
All times are China Standard Time (UTC+08:00)

=== Pool ===
Pos	Team	Pld	W	D	L	GF	GA	GD	Pts	Qualification
1	Argentina	5	2	3	0	9	4	+5	9	Final
2	China	5	2	3	0	5	3	+2	9	Final
3	Australia	5	2	2	1	7	4	+3	8	
4	Netherlands	5	1	4	0	6	4	+2	7	
5	New Zealand	5	1	1	3	8	7	+1	4	
6	England	5	0	1	4	1	14	−13	1	

Source: FIH
Rules for classification: 1) points; 2) goal difference; 3) goals scored; 4) head-to-head result.

24 August 2002
15:00

Argentina	1–0	New Zealand
González Oliva 51'	Report

Umpires:
Renée Cohen (NED)
Yao Hongjun (CHN)

24 August 2002
17:00

Australia	0–0	Netherlands
	Report

Umpires:
Jane Nockolds (ENG)
Marelize de Klerk (RSA)

24 August 2002
20:00

China	1–1	England
Chen Z. 69'	Report	Clewlow 53'

Umpires:
Jean Duncan (SCO)
Minka Woolley (AUS)

25 August 2002
16:00

Argentina	1–1	Netherlands
Masotta 42'	Report	Booij 15'

Umpires:
Jean Duncan (SCO)
Xiong Ru (CHN)

25 August 2002
18:00

England	0–5	New Zealand
	Report	Pearce 10'; Provan 32', 43'; Turner 49'; Hamahona 67'

Umpires:
Marelize de Klerk (RSA)
Chieko Akiyama (JPN)

25 August 2002
20:00

Australia	0–1	China
	Report	Ma 58'

Umpires:
Ute Conen (GER)
Renée Cohen (NED)

27 August 2002
16:00

Australia	3–1	New Zealand
Dobson 28'; Powell 35'; Alcorn 45'	Report	Christie 8'

Umpires:
Jane Nockolds (ENG)
Renée Cohen (NED)

27 August 2002
18:00

Argentina	4–0	England
Oneto 4'; Aymar 38', 67'; Rognoni 41'	Report

Umpires:
Ute Conen (GER)
Minka Woolley (AUS)

27 August 2002
20:00

China	1–1	Netherlands
Zhou 35'	Report	Boomgaardt 10'

Umpires:
Marelize de Klerk (RSA)
Chieko Akiyama (JPN)

28 August 2002
16:00

Australia	2–0	England
Banning 20'; Alcorn 31'	Report

Umpires:
Ute Conen (GER)
Xiong Ru (CHN)

28 August 2002
18:00

Netherlands	2–2	New Zealand
Booij 2'; Moreira de Melo 62'	Report	Gubb-Suddaby 43'; Drysdale 56'

Umpires:
Minka Woolley (AUS)
Yao Hongjun (CHN)

28 August 2002
20:00

Argentina	1–1	China
Oneto 11'	Report	Zhou 18'

Umpires:
Jane Nockolds (ENG)
Jean Duncan (SCO)

30 August 2002
16:00

England	0–2	Netherlands
	Report	Scheepstra 31'; Booij 38'

Umpires:
Marelize de Klerk (RSA)
Jean Duncan (SCO)

30 August 2002
18:00

China	1–0	New Zealand
Tang 63'	Report

Umpires:
Renée Cohen (NED)
Jane Nockolds (ENG)

30 August 2002
20:00

Argentina	2–2	Australia
García 6'; Oneto 39'	Report	Towers 25'; Skirving 60'

Umpires:
Chieko Akiyama (JPN)
Ute Conen (GER)

=== Classification ===
==== Fifth and sixth place ====
1 September 2002
09:00

New Zealand	2–0	England
Christie 10'; Roberts-Lang 68'	Report

Umpires:
Marelize de Klerk (RSA)
Minka Woolley (AUS)

==== Third and fourth place ====
1 September 2002
17:30

Australia	3–4 (a.e.t.)	Netherlands
Gallagher 18'; Dobson 26', 68'	Report	Boomgaardt 32', 51'; Moreira de Melo 63'; Donners 73'

Umpires:
Chieko Akiyama (JPN)
Jane Nockolds (ENG)

==== Final ====
1 September 2002
20:00

Argentina	2–2 (a.e.t.)	China
Oneto 63', 66'	Report	Hou 17', 27'
Penalties
González Oliva (penalty shoot-out missed); Rognoni (penalty shoot-out missed); Margalot (penalty shoot-out scored); Masotta (penalty shoot-out missed)	1–3	(penalty shoot-out scored) Fu; (penalty shoot-out missed) Chen Q. (penalty shoot-out scored) Hou; (penalty shoot-out missed) Tang; (penalty shoot-out scored) Zhou

Umpires:
Renée Cohen (NED)
Ute Conen (GER)

Team details

Argentina
China

GK	1	Mariela Antoniska
DF	6	Ayelén Stepnik
DF	3	Magdalena Aicega
DF	14	Mercedes Margalot
DF	16	Cecilia Rognoni	(yellow card) 78'
MF	12	Mariana González Oliva
MF	8	Luciana Aymar
FW	2	Soledad García
FW	4	María Paz Ferrari
FW	9	Vanina Oneto
FW	11	Karina Masotta (c)
Substitutions:
MF	5	Anabel Gambero		(substituted on) 18'
FW	15	María P. Hernández		(substituted on) 24'
MF	19	Mariné Russo		(substituted on) 22'
FW	21	Inés Arrondo		(substituted on) 26'
DF	24	Claudia Burkart		(substituted on) 7'
Coach:
(Argentina) Sergio Vigil

GK	1	Nie Yali
	2	Long Fengyu
	3	Chen Zhaoxia (c)
	4	Ma Yibo
	5	Cheng Hui
	7	Huang Junxia
	8	Fu Baorong
	9	Li Ghaung
	11	Tang Chunling
	12	Zhou Wanfeng
	15	Hou Xiaolan
Substitutions:
	19	Chen Qunqing	(substituted on) 11'
	20	Wang Jiuyan	(substituted on) 23'
	21	Zhang Shuang	(substituted on) 50'
	22	Li Aili	(substituted on) 29'
Coach:
(China) Kim Chang-Back

== Awards ==
Top Goalscorer	Player of the Tournament
(Argentina) Cecilia Rognoni	(Argentina) Vanina Oneto

== Statistics ==
=== Final standings ===
1. China
2. Argentina
3. Netherlands
4. Australia
5. New Zealand
6. England

=== Goalscorers ===
There were 49 goals scored in 18 matches, for an average of 2.72 goals per match.

5 goals

- (Argentina) Vanina Oneto

3 goals

- (Australia) Louise Dobson
- (Netherlands) Minke Booij
- (Netherlands) Ageeth Boomgaardt

2 goals

- (Argentina) Luciana Aymar
- (Australia) Wendy Alcorn
- (China) Hou Xiaolan
- (China) Zhou Wanfeng
- (Netherlands) Fatima Moreira de Melo
- (New Zealand) Amanda Christie
- (New Zealand) Jaimee Provan

1 goal

- (Argentina) Soledad García
- (Argentina) Mariana González Oliva
- (Argentina) Karina Masotta
- (Argentina) Cecilia Rognoni
- (Australia) Joanne Banning
- (Australia) Peta Gallagher
- (Australia) Katrina Powell
- (Australia) Angie Skirving
- (Australia) Melanie Twitt
- (China) Chen Zhaoxia
- (China) Ma Yibo
- (China) Tang Chunling
- (England) Mel Clewlow
- (Netherlands) Mijntje Donners
- (Netherlands) Maartje Scheepstra
- (New Zealand) Tara Drysdale
- (New Zealand) Colleen Gubb-Suddaby
- (New Zealand) Marama Hamahona
- (New Zealand) Suzie Pearce
- (New Zealand) Ninina Roberts-Lang
- (New Zealand) Michelle Turner

Source: FIH
