= 2004 Women's Four Nations Hockey Tournament (Alcalá la Real) =

Four Nations
Tournament details
- Host country: Spain
- City: Alcalá la Real
- Teams: 4 (from 3 confederations)
- Venue: Club Hockey Alcalá

Final positions
- Champions: Netherlands
- Runner-up: Argentina
- Third place: Australia

Tournament statistics
- Matches played: 8
- Goals scored: 35 (4.38 per match)
- Top scorer: (Argentina) Alejandra Gulla (4 goals)

The 2004 Women's Four Nations Hockey Tournament was a women's field hockey tournament, consisting of a series of test matches. It was held in Alcalá la Real, Spain, from July 30 to August 3, 2004, and featured four of the top nations in women's field hockey. The event was held as a precursor to the upcoming Olympic Games.

== Competition format ==
The tournament featured the national teams of Argentina, Australia, the Netherlands, and the hosts, Spain, competing in a round-robin format, with each team playing each other once. Three points were awarded for a win, one for a draw, and none for a loss.

Country	November 2003 FIH Ranking	Best World Cup finish	Best Olympic Games finish
Argentina	1	Champions (2002)	Runners-Up (2000)
Australia	2	Champions (1994, 1998)	Champions (1988, 1996, 2000)
Netherlands	3	Champions (1974, 1978, 1983, 1986, 1990)	Champions (1984)
Spain	7	Fifth Place (1976, 1990)	Champions (1992)

== Officials ==
The following umpires were appointed by the International Hockey Federation to officiate the tournament:

- Caroline Brunekreef (NED)
- Soledad Iparraguirre (ARG)
- Anne McRae (GBR)
- Mónica Rivera (ESP)
- Melissa Trivic (AUS)

== Results ==
All times are local (Argentina Standard Time).

=== Preliminary round ===
Pos	Team	Pld	W	D	L	GF	GA	GD	Pts	Qualification
1	Netherlands	3	3	0	0	9	2	+7	9	Advanced to Final
2	Argentina (H)	3	2	0	1	10	4	+6	6	Advanced to Final
3	Australia	3	1	0	2	6	3	+3	3	
4	Spain	3	0	0	3	1	17	−16	0	

Source: CAH
Rules for classification: 1) points; 2) goal difference; 3) goals scored; 4) head-to-head result.
(H) Hosts

==== Fixtures ====
30 July 2004
11:00

Argentina	2–3	Netherlands
García 36'; Rognoni 69'	Report	Donners 4'; Mulder 17'; Moreira de Melo 62'

Umpires:
Mónica Rivera (ESP)
Melissa Trivic (AUS)

30 July 2004
18:00

Australia	6–0	Spain
K. Smith 2', 50'; Skirving 14'; Hudson 28'; Powell 38'; Netzler 60'	Report

Umpires:
Anne McRae (GBR)
Soledad Iparraguirre (ARG)

31 July 2004
10:00

Netherlands	2–0	Australia
Boomgaardt 25'; Booij 35'	Report

Umpires:
Mónica Rivera (ESP)
Anne McRae (GBR)

31 July 2004
12:00

Argentina	7–1	Spain
Aymar 30', 45'; Gulla 41', 48', 51', 58'; García 43'	Report	López 60'

Umpires:
Caroline Brunekreef (NED)
Melissa Trivic (AUS)

2 August 2004
11:00

Australia	0–1	Argentina
	Report	García 3'

Umpires:
Mónica Rivera (ESP)
Caroline Brunekreef (NED)

2 August 2004
18:00

Netherlands	4–0	Spain
Boomgaardt 5'; Karres 20'; Mulder 59'; Donners 66'	Report

Umpires:
Soledad Iparraguirre (ARG)
Anne McRae (GBR)

=== Classification round ===
==== Third and fourth place ====
3 August 2004
11:00

Australia	4–0	Spain
N. Smith 12', 59'; Towers 53'; Dobson 65'	Report

Umpires:
Soledad Iparraguirre (ARG)
Caroline Brunekreef (NED)

==== Final ====
3 August 2004
13:00

Netherlands	5–0	Argentina
Van der Vaart 8'; Karres 33'; Scheepstra 45'; Donners 58'; Boomgaardt 65'	Report

Umpires:
Melissa Trivic (AUS)
Anne McRae (GBR)

== Statistics ==
=== Final standings ===
Pos	Team	Pld	W	D	L	GF	GA	GD	Pts	Status
1st place, gold medalist(s)	Netherlands	4	4	0	0	14	2	+12	12	Tournament Champion
2nd place, silver medalist(s)	Argentina (H)	4	2	0	2	10	9	+1	6	
3rd place, bronze medalist(s)	Australia	4	2	0	2	10	3	+7	6	
4	Spain	4	0	0	4	1	21	−20	0	

Source: CAH
(H) Hosts

=== Goalscorers ===
There were 35 goals scored in 8 matches, for an average of 4.38 goals per match.

4 goals

- (Argentina) Alejandra Gulla

3 goals

- (Argentina) Soledad García
- (Netherlands) Ageeth Boomgaardt
- (Netherlands) Mijntje Donners

2 goals

- (Argentina) Luciana Aymar
- (Australia) Karen Smith
- (Australia) Ngaire Smith
- (Netherlands) Sylvia Karres
- (Netherlands) Eefke Mulder

1 goal

- (Argentina) Cecilia Rognoni
- (Australia) Louise Dobson
- (Australia) Nicole Hudson
- (Australia) Bianca Netzler
- (Australia) Katrina Powell
- (Australia) Angela Skirving
- (Australia) Julie Towers
- (Netherlands) Minke Booij
- (Netherlands) Fatima Moreira de Melo
- (Netherlands) Maartje Scheepstra
- (Netherlands) Macha van der Vaart
- (Spain) Lucía López
