= 2003 Women's Hockey RaboTrophy =

Tournament details
- Host country: Netherlands
- City: Amsterdam
- Teams: 4
- Venue(s): Wagener Stadium

Final positions
- Champions: Australia (1st title)
- Runner-up: Netherlands
- Third place: Argentina

Tournament statistics
- Matches played: 8
- Goals scored: 31 (3.88 per match)
- Top scorer(s): (Netherlands) Mijntje Donners (6 goals)
- Best player: (Australia) Julie Towers

The 2003 Women's Hockey RaboTrophy was the first edition of the women's field hockey tournament. The RaboTrophy was held in Amsterdam from 18 to 23 August 2003, and featured four of the top nations in women's field hockey.

Australia won the tournament for the first time, defeating the Netherlands 2–1 in the Final.

The tournament was held in conjunction with the Men's FIH Champions Trophy.

== Competition format ==
The four teams competed in a pool stage, played in a single round robin format. At the conclusion of the pool stage, the top two teams contested the final, while the remaining teams played off for third place.

== Teams ==
The following four teams competed for the title:

- Argentina
- Australia
- Germany
- Netherlands

== Officials ==
The following umpires were appointed by the International Hockey Federation to officiate the tournament:

- Renée Cohen (NED)
- Soledad Iparraguirre (ARG)
- Renaté Peters (GER)
- Minka Woolley (AUS)
- Kazuko Yasueda (JPN)

== Results ==
All times are local (Central European Time).

=== Preliminary round ===
Pos	Team	Pld	W	D	L	GF	GA	GD	Pts	Qualification
1	Netherlands (H)	3	3	0	0	9	0	+9	9	Advanced to Final
2	Australia	3	2	0	1	6	2	+4	6	Advanced to Final
3	Argentina	3	1	0	2	6	8	−2	3	
4	Germany	3	0	0	3	1	12	−11	0	

Source: Hockey Australia
Rules for classification: 1) Points; 2) Goal difference; 3) Goals scored; 4) Games won; 5) Head-to-head.
(H) Hosts

==== Fixtures ====
18 August 2004
14:30

Australia	3–0	Argentina
Netzler 41'; K. Smith 48'; Skirving 69'	Report

Umpires:
Renée Cohen (NED)
Renaté Peters (GER)

18 August 2004
19:30

Netherlands	3–0	Germany
Donners 26', 29'; Moreira de Melo 61'	Report

Umpires:
Kazuko Yasueda (JPN)
Soledad Iparraguirre (ARG)

19 August 2004
14:30

Australia	3–1	Germany
Towers 39', 44', 60'	Report	Kollmar 19'

Umpires:
Renée Cohen (NED)
Soledad Iparraguirre (ARG)

20 August 2004
19:30

Argentina	0–5	Netherlands
	Report	Donners 18', 33', 60'; Van Geenhuizen 34'; Moreira de Melo 40'

Umpires:
Minka Woolley (AUS)
Kazuko Yasueda (JPN)

22 August 2004
14:30

Argentina	6–0	Germany
García 3'; Arrondo 11', 23'; Ferrari 31'; Rognoni 42'; Doreski 66'	Report

Umpires:
Renée Cohen (NED)
Minka Woolley (AUS)

22 August 2004
19:30

Netherlands	1–0	Australia
Lammers 70'	Report

Umpires:
Kazuko Yasueda (JPN)
Renaté Peters (GER)

=== Classification round ===
==== Third and fourth place ====
23 August 2004
10:00

Argentina	4–2	Germany
Aymar 6'; Gulla 29'; Arrondo 49'; Di Giacomo 50'	Report	Böhmert 1'; Klecker 10'

Umpires:
Minka Woolley (AUS)
Kazuko Yasueda (JPN)

==== Final ====
23 August 2004
10:00

Netherlands	1–2	Australia
Donners 6'	Report	Gallagher 12'; Rivers 17'

Umpires:
Soledad Iparraguirre (ARG)
Renaté Peters (GER)

== Awards ==
Player of the Tournament	Top Goalscorer	Most Promising Player	Fair Play Trophy
(Australia) Julie Towers	(Netherlands) Mijntje Donners	(Netherlands) Maartje Scheepstra	Australia

== Statistics ==
=== Final standings ===
As per statistical convention in field hockey, matches decided in extra time are counted as wins and losses, while matches decided by penalty shoot-outs are counted as draws.

Pos	Team	Pld	W	D	L	GF	GA	GD	Pts	Status
1st place, gold medalist(s)	Australia	4	3	0	1	8	3	+5	9	Gold Medal
2nd place, silver medalist(s)	Netherlands (H)	4	3	0	1	10	2	+8	9	Silver Medal
3rd place, bronze medalist(s)	Argentina	4	2	0	2	10	10	0	6	Bronze Medal
4	Germany	4	0	0	4	3	16	−13	0	

Source: Hockey Australia
(H) Hosts

=== Goalscorers ===
There were 31 goals scored in 8 matches, for an average of 3.88 goals per match.

6 goals

- (Netherlands) Mijntje Donners

3 goals

- (Argentina) Inés Arrondo
- (Australia) Julie Towers

2 goals

- (Netherlands) Fatima Moreira de Melo

1 goal

- (Argentina) Luciana Aymar
- (Argentina) Natalí Doreski
- (Argentina) María Paz Ferrari
- (Argentina) Soledad García
- (Argentina) Marina di Giacomo
- (Argentina) Alejandra Gulla
- (Argentina) Cecilia Rognoni
- (Australia) Peta Gallagher
- (Australia) Bianca Netzler
- (Australia) Megan Rivers
- (Australia) Angela Skirving
- (Australia) Karen Smith
- (Germany) Anneke Böhmert
- (Germany) Denise Klecker
- (Germany) Alexandra Kollmar
- (Netherlands) Marianne van Geenhuizen
- (Netherlands) Kim Lammers
