= 2001 Women's Oceania Cup =

Field hockey tournament

2001 Oceania Cup
Tournament details
- Host country: New Zealand
- Dates: 26–29 July
- Venue: 3 (in 3 host cities)

Final positions
- Champions: Australia (2nd title)
- Runner-up: New Zealand

Tournament statistics
- Matches played: 3
- Goals scored: 15 (5 per match)
- Top scorer: (Australia) Alyson Annan (4 goals)

The 2001 Women's Oceania Cup was the second edition of the women's field hockey tournament. It was held from 26 to 29 July in Auckland, Hamilton and Wellington.

The tournament served as a qualifier for the 2002 FIH World Cup.

Australia won the tournament for the second time, defeating New Zealand in the three–game series, 3–0. However, as Australia had already qualified for the FIH World Cup as the host nation, the entry quota was awarded to New Zealand.

== Results ==
All times are local (NZST).

=== Pool ===
Pos	Team	Pld	W	D	L	GF	GA	GD	Pts	Qualification
1	Australia	3	3	0	0	11	4	+7	9	
2	New Zealand	3	0	0	3	4	11	−7	0	2002 FIH World Cup

Source: Clearing House
Rules for classification: 1) points; 2) goal difference; 3) goals scored; 4) head-to-head result.

=== Fixtures ===
26 July 2001
19:30

New Zealand	1–3	Australia
Ward 58'	Report	J. Towers 24'; Banning 31'; Dobson 38'

National Hockey Stadium, Wellington
Umpires:
Lee Mi-ok (KOR)
Marelize de Klerk (RSA)

28 July 2001
15:30

New Zealand	2–5	Australia
Pearce 12', 55'	Report	Annan 9', 10', 14', 48'; Powell 17'

Lloyd Elsmore Hockey Stadium, Auckland
Umpires:
Marelize de Klerk (RSA)
Lee Mi-ok (KOR)

29 July 2001
13:00

New Zealand	1–3	Australia
Munns 50'	Report	Hudson 5'; Skirving 24'; Walker 32'

Gallagher Hockey Centre, Hamilton
Umpires:
Lee Mi-ok (KOR)
Marelize de Klerk (RSA)

== Statistics ==
=== Final standings ===
1. Australia
2. New Zealand

=== Goalscorers ===
There were 15 goals scored in 3 matches, for an average of 5 goals per match.

4 goals

- (Australia) Alyson Annan

2 goals

- (New Zealand) Suzanne Pearce

1 goal

- (Australia) Joanne Banning
- (Australia) Louise Dobson
- (Australia) Nicole Hudson
- (Australia) Katrina Powell
- (Australia) Angela Skirving
- (Australia) Julie Towers
- (Australia) Kim Walker
- (New Zealand) Penny Munns
- (New Zealand) Carol Ward

Source: Hockey Australia
