= 2004 Women's Athens International Hockey Tournament =

Athens International Tournament
Tournament details
- Host country: Greece
- City: Athens
- Dates: 4–8 February
- Teams: 4 (from 3 confederations)
- Venue: Hellinikon Olympic Hockey Centre

Final positions
- Champions: South Africa
- Runner-up: Spain
- Third place: Australia

Tournament statistics
- Matches played: 8
- Goals scored: 24 (3 per match)
- Top scorer: (South Africa) Pietie Coetzee (5 goals)

The 2004 Women's Athens International Hockey Tournament was a women's field hockey tournament, consisting of a series of test matches. It was held in Athens, Greece, from 4 to 8 February 2008. The tournament served as a test event for the field hockey tournament at the 2004 Summer Olympics. The tournament featured four of the top nations in women's field hockey.

South Africa won the tournament after defeating Spain 1–0 in the final. Australia finished in third place after defeating Great Britain 2–0 in the third place playoff.

== Competition format ==
The tournament featured the national teams of Australia, Great Britain, South Africa and Spain, competing in a round-robin format, with each team playing each other once. Three points were awarded for a win, one for a draw, and none for a loss.

Country	December 2003 FIH Ranking	Best World Cup finish	Best Olympic Games finish
Australia	2	Champions (1994, 1998)	Champions (1988, 1996, 2000)
Great Britain*	5	Fourth Place (1990)	Third Place (1992)
South Africa	12	Seventh Place (1998)	Tenth Place (2000)
Spain	7	Fifth place (1990)	Champions (1992)

* includes results representing England, Scotland and Wales.

== Results ==
All times are local (EET).

=== Preliminary round ===
==== Pool ====
Pos	Team	Pld	W	D	L	GF	GA	GD	Pts	Qualification
1	South Africa	3	3	0	0	8	4	+4	9	Advanced to Final
2	Spain	3	1	1	1	3	3	0	4	Advanced to Final
3	Great Britain	3	0	2	1	5	7	−2	2	
4	Australia	3	0	1	2	5	7	−2	1	

Source: Hockey Australia
Rules for classification: 1) points; 2) goal difference; 3) goals scored; 4) head-to-head result.

==== Fixtures ====
4 February 2004
13:30

Australia	0–1	Spain
	Report	Tellería 37'

Umpires:
Marelize de Klerk (RSA)
Jean Duncan (SCO)

4 February 2004
19:30

Great Britain	1–3	South Africa
Bennett 63'	Report	Coetzee 19'; Webber 59'; Carlisle 67'

Umpires:
Heike Malina (GER)
Lisa Roach (AUS)

5 February 2004
13:30

Great Britain	2–2	Australia
Clement 31', 47'	Report	Faulkner 6'; Gallagher 54'

Umpires:
Magdalena Martos (ESP)
Heike Malina (GER)

5 February 2004
17:30

Spain	0–1	South Africa
	Report	Wilson 15'

Umpires:
Lisa Roach (AUS)
Jean Duncan (SCO)

7 February 2004
12:00

Spain	2–2	Great Britain
Rueda 45'; Camón 57'	Report	Simpson 2'; Clement 49'

Umpires:
Lisa Roach (AUS)
Marelize de Klerk (RSA)

7 February 2004
14:00

Australia	3–4	South Africa
Faulkner 1'; Dobson 7'; Powell 35'	Report	Marescia 9'; Coetzee 19', 60', 63'

Umpires:
Jean Duncan (SCO)
Magdalena Martos (ESP)

=== Classification round ===
==== Third and fourth place ====
8 February 2004
12:00

Great Britain	0–2	Australia
	Report	Dobson 35'; Powell 59'

Umpires:
Magdalena Martos (ESP)
Marelize de Klerk (RSA)

==== Final ====
8 February 2004
17:00

South Africa	1–0	Spain
Coetzee 37'	Report

Umpires:
Heike Malina (GER)
Lisa Roach (AUS)

== Statistics ==
=== Final standings ===
As per statistical convention in field hockey, matches decided in extra time are counted as wins and losses, while matches decided by penalty shoot-outs are counted as draws.

Pos	Team	Pld	W	D	L	GF	GA	GD	Pts	Final Result
1st place, gold medalist(s)	South Africa	4	4	0	0	9	4	+5	12	Tournament Champion
2nd place, silver medalist(s)	Spain	4	1	1	2	3	4	−1	4	
3rd place, bronze medalist(s)	Australia	4	1	1	2	7	7	0	4	
4	Great Britain	4	0	2	2	5	9	−4	2	

Source: Hockey Australia

=== Goalscorers ===
There were 24 goals scored in 8 matches, for an average of 3 goals per match.

5 goals

- (South Africa) Pietie Coetzee

3 goals

- (United Kingdom) Linda Clement

2 goals

- (Australia) Louise Dobson
- (Australia) Suzanne Faulkner
- (Australia) Katrina Powell

1 goal

- (Australia) Peta Gallagher
- (United Kingdom) Anna Bennett
- (United Kingdom) Rhona Simpson
- (South Africa) Lindsey Carlisle
- (South Africa) Marsha Marescia
- (South Africa) Susan Webber
- (South Africa) Jennifer Wilson
- (Spain) Núria Camón
- (Spain) Mónica Rueda
- (Spain) Maider Tellería
