= Hockey at the 2006 Commonwealth Games – Women's tournament =

2006 Commonwealth Games – Women's hockey
Tournament details
- Host country: Australia
- City: Melbourne
- Dates: 7 – 26 March
- Teams: 10
- Venue: State Netball and Hockey Centre

Final positions
- Champions: Australia (2nd title)
- Runner-up: India
- Third place: England

Tournament statistics
- Matches played: 27
- Goals scored: 136 (5.04 per match)
- Top scorer(s): (Australia) Nicole Hudson (New Zealand) Krystal Forgesson (Scotland) Victoria Bunce (5 goals)

Women's field hockey at the 2006 Commonwealth Games took place between 16 March and 25 March. The competition consisted of a round robin stage of two groups of five with the winners and runners-up of each group qualifying for the semifinals. All matches were played at the State Netball and Hockey Centre in the Parkville area of Melbourne.

The Gold medal was won by Australia, who defeated 2002 champions India 1 – 0 in the final. England won the bronze medal by defeating New Zealand 3 – 1 on penalty strokes.

== Results ==
=== Preliminary round ===
==== Pool A ====
Pos	Team	Pld	W	D	L	GF	GA	GD	Pts	Qualification
1	Australia	4	4	0	0	27	2	+25	12	Semi-finals
2	India	4	2	1	1	18	7	+11	7	Semi-finals
3	Malaysia	4	2	0	2	7	15	−8	6	
4	South Africa	4	1	1	2	7	8	−1	4	
5	Nigeria	4	0	0	4	1	28	−27	0	

Source: The CGF
Rules for classification: 1) points; 2) goal difference; 3) goals scored; 4) head-to-head result.

16 March 2006
13:00

Malaysia	4–0	Nigeria
Nadia 32'; Intan 46', 54'; Norfarhara 65'	Report

Umpires:
Julie Ashton-Lucy (AUS)
Anne McRae (SCO)

16 March 2006
18:00

Australia	4–2	India
Beattie 1'; Smith 23'; Sanders 41'; Skirving 70'	Report	Lakra 13'; Kharb 22'

Umpires:
Sarah Garnett (NZL)
Alison Hill (ENG)

17 March 2006
14:00

Nigeria	1–4	South Africa
Bulus 54'	Report	Hector 12'; Wilson 32'; Bright 41'; Marescia 53'

Umpires:
Alison Hill (ENG)
Gina Spitaleri (ITA)

17 March 2006
21:00

Australia	8–0	Malaysia
Sanders 9', 49'; Arrold 23'; Hollywood 25'; Hudson 28'; Faulkner 49'; Blyth 57'; Skirving 65'	Report

Umpires:
Sarah Garnett (NZL)
Corrine Cornelius (RSA)

18 March 2006
13:30

South Africa	2–2	India
Du Buisson 8', 12'	Report	Pradhan 29', 69'

Umpires:
Minka Woolley (AUS)
Alison Hill (ENG)

19 March 2006
11:00

Nigeria	0–12	Australia
	Report	Blyth 1'; Skirving 7'; Arrold 16', 19'; Hudson 30', 35', 53'; Halliday 32'; Beattie 39'; Taylor 51'; Smith 58'; Hollywood 62'

Umpires:
Wendy Stewart (CAN)
Corrine Cornelius (RSA)

20 March 2006
08:30

Malaysia	2–1	South Africa
Siti 24'; Kannagi 43'	Report	Du Buisson 46'

Umpires:
Minka Woolley (AUS)
Anne McRae (SCO)

20 March 2006
10:30

India	8–0	Nigeria
Mamta 2', 31'; Jyoti 11'; Sanggai 32'; Saba 34'; Sarita 36'; Jasjeet 47', 66'	Report

Umpires:
Julie Ashton-Lucy (AUS)
Alison Hill (ENG)

21 March 2006
13:30

Australia	3–0	South Africa
Faulkner 13'; Arrold 50'; Skirving 62'	Report

Umpires:
Gina Spitaleri (ITA)
Alison Hill (ENG)

21 March 2006
21:00

Malaysia	1–6	India
Intan 61'	Report	Jasjeet 21'; Jyoti 27'; Sarita 30'; Mamta 32'; Asunta 41'; Saba 47'

Umpires:
Sarah Garnett (NZL)
Anne McRae (SCO)

==== Pool B ====
Pos	Team	Pld	W	D	L	GF	GA	GD	Pts	Qualification
1	New Zealand	4	4	0	0	20	1	+19	12	Semi-finals
2	England	4	3	0	1	20	4	+16	9	Semi-finals
3	Scotland	4	2	0	2	11	8	+3	6	
4	Canada	4	1	0	3	5	10	−5	3	
5	Barbados	4	0	0	4	0	33	−33	0	

Source: The CGF
Rules for classification: 1) points; 2) goal difference; 3) goals scored; 4) head-to-head result.

16 March 2006
11:00

Barbados	0–4	Canada
	Report	Buker 4'; Michaluk 41'; Rushton 48'; Hume 65'

Umpires:
Anupama Puchimanda (IND)
Corrine Cornelius (RSA)

16 March 2006
16:00

New Zealand	2–1	Scotland
Sharland 17'; Igasan 40'	Report	Judge 59'

Umpires:
Minka Woolley (AUS)
Wendy Stewart (CAN)

17 March 2006
13:30

Canada	0–5	England
	Report	Wright 7'; Walsh 13', 42', 55'; Grant 58'

Umpires:
Minka Woolley (ASU)
Anne McRae (SCO)

17 March 2006
16:30

Barbados	0–11	New Zealand
	Report	Dillon 13'; Forgesson 14', 31', 56'; Igasan 35+'; Maley 36'; Harrison 37', 38', 64'; Kreft 59'; Hollands 67'

Umpires:
Anupama Puchimanda (IND)
Julie Ashton-Lucy (AUS)

18 March 2006
10:30

England	5–0	Scotland
Rogers 4', 37'; Clewlow 18', 40'; Grant 64'	Report

Umpires:
Sarah Garnett (NZL)
Julie Ashton-Lucy (AUS)

19 March 2006
13:00

Canada	0–3	New Zealand
	Report	Forgesson 26'; Igasan 53'; Sharland 54'

Umpires:
Minka Woolley (AUS)
Alison Hill (ENG)

20 March 2006
13:30

England	10–0	Barbados
Herbert 6'; Cullen 14', 32', 34', 53'; Grant 27', 66'; Richardson 41'; Wright 44'; Danson 61'	Report

Umpires:
Sarah Garnett (NZL)
Anupama Puchimanda (IND)

20 March 2006
20:30

Canada	1–2	Scotland
Michaluk 2'	Report	Semple 33'; Judge 45'

Umpires:
Corrine Cornelius (RSA)
Gina Spitaleri (ITA)

21 March 2006
16:00

England	0–4	New Zealand
	Report	Harrison 19'; Forgesson 58'; Dillon 61'; Muirhead 62'

Umpires:
Julie Ashton-Lucy (AUS)
Minka Woolley (AUS)

21 March 2006
19:00

Scotland	8–0	Barbados
Clement 14'; Bunce 28', 34', 49', 61', 67'; Semple 62'; Judge 65'	Report

Umpires:
Anupama Puchimanda (IND)
Tracey Wrigley (NZL)

=== Classification round ===
==== Fifth to tenth place classification ====
===== Ninth and tenth place =====
23 March 2006
08:30

Nigeria	1–4	Barbados
Agbo 19'	Report	Davis 13'; Greaves 45', 62'; Haynes 58'

Umpires:
Anupama Puchimanda (IND)
Wendy Stewart (CAN)

===== Seventh and eighth place =====
23 March 2006
20:00

Canada	2–5	South Africa
Michaluk 38'; Rushton 50'	Report	Wilson 8', 25', 65'; Taylor 57'; Du Buisson 69'

Umpires:
Sarah Garnett (NZL)
Nor Piza Hassan (MAS)

===== Fifth and sixth place =====
23 March 2006
13:30

Malaysia	0–3	Scotland
	Report	Rochlin 1'; Clement 13'; Simpson 35'

Umpires:
Alison Hill (ENG)
Corrine Cornelius (RSA)

==== First to fourth place classification ====
Semi-finals
23 March 2006
Australia	3
England	0
23 March 2006
New Zealand	0
India	1

Gold-medal match
25 March 2006
Australia	1
India	0
Bronze-medal match
35 March 2006
England (p.)	0 (3)
New Zealand	0 (1)

===== Semi-finals =====
23 March 2006
11:00

Australia	3–0	England
Hollywood 28'; Halliday 37'; Faulkner 69'	Report

Umpires:
Sarah Garnett (NZL)
Anne McRae (SCO)

23 March 2006
17:30

New Zealand	0–1	India
	Report	Surinder 62'

Umpires:
Julie Ashton-Lucy (AUS)
Minka Woolley (AUS)

===== Bronze-medal match =====
25 March 2006
10:30

England	0–0	New Zealand
	Report
Penalties
	3–1

Umpires:
Julie Ashton-Lucy (AUS)
Minka Woolley (AUS)

===== Gold-medal match =====
25 March 2006
13:00

Australia	1–0	India
Hudson 62'	Report

Umpires:
Sarah Garnett (NZL)
Anne McRae (SCO)

== Statistics ==
=== Final standings ===
As per statistical convention in field hockey, matches decided in extra time are counted as wins and losses, while matches decided by penalty shoot-outs are counted as draws.

Pos	Team	Pld	W	D	L	GF	GA	GD	Pts	Final result
1st place, gold medalist(s)	Australia	6	6	0	0	31	2	+29	18	Gold Medal
2nd place, silver medalist(s)	India	6	3	1	2	19	8	+11	10	Silver Medal
3rd place, bronze medalist(s)	England	6	3	1	2	20	7	+13	10	Bronze Medal
4	New Zealand	6	4	1	1	20	2	+18	13	Fourth place
5	Scotland	5	3	0	2	14	8	+6	9	Eliminated in group stage
6	Malaysia	5	2	0	3	7	18	−11	6	Eliminated in group stage
7	South Africa	5	2	1	2	12	10	+2	7	Eliminated in group stage
8	Canada	5	1	0	4	7	15	−8	3	Eliminated in group stage
9	Barbados	5	1	0	4	4	34	−30	3	Eliminated in group stage
10	Nigeria	5	0	0	5	2	32	−30	0	Eliminated in group stage

Source: The CGF

=== Goalscorers ===
There were 136 goals scored in 27 matches, for an average of 5.04 goals per match.

5 goals

- (Australia) Nicole Hudson
- (New Zealand) Krystal Forgesson
- (Scotland) Victoria Bunce

4 goals

- (Australia) Nicole Arrold
- (Australia) Angela Skirving
- (England) Crista Cullen
- (England) Helen Grant
- (India) Mamta Kharab
- (New Zealand) Charlotte Harrison
- (South Africa) Henriette du Buisson
- (South Africa) Jennifer Wilson

3 goals

- (Australia) Suzanne Faulkner
- (Australia) Kate Hollywood
- (Australia) Rebecca Sanders
- (Canada) Tiffany Michaluk
- (England) Kate Walsh
- (India) Jasjeet Kaur Handa
- (Malaysia) Intan Ahmad
- (New Zealand) Elizabeth Igasan
- (Scotland) Samantha Judge

2 goals

- (Australia) Wendy Beattie
- (Australia) Madonna Blyth
- (Australia) Emily Halliday
- (Australia) Karen Smith
- (Barbados) Tricia-Ann Greaves
- (Canada) Andrea Rushton
- (England) Melanie Clewlow
- (England) Chloe Rogers
- (England) Lucilla Wright
- (India) Saba Anjum
- (India) Jyoti Sunita Kullu
- (India) Asunta Lakra
- (India) Sarita Lakra
- (India) Subhadra Pradhan
- (New Zealand) Honor Dillon
- (New Zealand) Kayla Sharland
- (Scotland) Linda Clement
- (Scotland) Catriona Semple

1 goal

- (Australia) Sarah Taylor
- (Barbados) Joanna Davis
- (Barbados) Allison Haynes
- (Canada) Kimberley Buker
- (Canada) Stephanie Hume
- (England) Alexandra Danson
- (England) Rebecca Herbert
- (England) Helen Richardson
- (India) Sanggai Chanu
- (India) Surinder Kaur
- (Malaysia) Kannagi Arumugam
- (Malaysia) Norfarhara Hashim
- (Malaysia) Nadia Rahman
- (Malaysia) Siti Ruhani
- (New Zealand) Michelle Hollands
- (New Zealand) Suzanne Muirhead
- (New Zealand) Frances Kreft
- (New Zealand) Jane Maley
- (Nigeria) Christine Agbo
- (Nigeria) Christine Bulus
- (Scotland) Emma Rochlin
- (Scotland) Rhona Simpson
- (South Africa) Tarryn Bright
- (South Africa) Katherine Hector
- (South Africa) Marsha Marescia
- (South Africa) Kathleen Taylor
