= Olympic Hockey Centre =

Olympic Hockey Centre may refer to:

- Olympic Hockey Centre (Athens), used for the 2004 Summer Olympics
- Riverbank Arena, formerly known as the Olympic Hockey Centre, which was used for the 2012 Summer Olympics in London
- Olympic Hockey Centre (Rio de Janeiro), the hockey venue at the 2016 Summer Olympics
