= Emi Sakurai =

Japanese field hockey player

Emi Sakurai (born 23 March 1982) is a Japanese former field hockey player who competed in the 2004 Summer Olympics.
