= Stacia Joseph =

Australian field hockey player

Personal information
- Born: 7 November 1985 (age 40) Melbourne, Australia

Sport
- Sport: Field hockey
- Position: Midfielder
- Club: HC Melbourne
National team
Years	Team	Caps	Goals
2009–2012	Australia	42	(1)
Medal record
Women's field hockey
Representing Australia
Champions Trophy
Silver medal – second place	2009 Sydney	Team
Oceania Cup
Silver medal – second place	2009 Invercargill	Team
Silver medal – second place	2011 Hobart	Team

Stacia Joseph (born 7 November 1985) is an Australian field hockey coach and former player, who represented the national team.

== Career ==
Joseph made 42 appearances for the national team. She made her international debut in June 2009 against Argentina in the 2009 Women's Hockey Spar Cup, and was later included in the Australian squad for the 2009 Women's Hockey Champions Trophy.

At club level, she played for Southern Storm in 2008. She was later captain of the Victorian Vipers from 2011 to 2015. During that time, the Vipers won the 2012 Australian Hockey League. In 2014, she was named the Victorian Premier League's most valuable player.

In 2016, she became the Victorian Institute of Sport's head hockey coach. During the 2018 Commonwealth Games, she was one of eight female coaches who worked in the Australian Institute of Sport's development program.

== Personal life ==
Joseph has worked as a physical education teacher. She had a child in 2018.
