= Hou Xiaolan =

Chinese field hockey player (born 1980)

Personal information
- Born: June 3, 1980 (age 46) Shaoguan, Guangdong, China
Medal record
Women's field hockey
Representing China
Asian Games
Gold medal – first place	2002 Busan	Team
Champions Trophy
Silver medal – second place	2003 Sydney	Team

Hou Xiaolan (simplified Chinese: 侯晓兰; traditional Chinese: 侯曉蘭; pinyin: Hóu Xiǎolán; Jyutping: Hau4 Hiu2 Laan4; born June 3, 1980, in Shaoguan, Guangdong) is a Chinese field hockey player who competed in the 2000 Summer Olympics and in the 2004 Summer Olympics.

In 2000, she was part of the Chinese team which finished fifth in the women's competition. She played all seven matches.

Four years later, Hou finished fourth with the Chinese team in the women's competition. She played all six matches.
