= Shayni Buswell =

Australian field hockey player

Shayni Nelson
Personal information
- Full name: Shayni Buswell
- Born: 1 February 1981 (age 45) Western Australia

Sport
- Sport: Field hockey
- Position: Midfield
Senior career
Years	Team	Caps	Goals
1999–2021	UWA	391	60
2001–2011	WA Diamonds	122	7
National team
Years	Team	Caps	Goals
2000–2001	Australia U–21	13	(1)
2002	Australia	5	(0)
Medal record
Women's field hockey
Representing Australia
FIH Junior World Cup
Bronze medal – third place	2001 Buenos Aires	Team
Junior Oceania Cup
Gold medal – first place	2000 Canberra	Team

Shayni Nelson (née Buswell, born 1 February 1981) is a former field hockey player from Australia, who played as a midfielder.

== Career ==
=== Club hockey ===
In Hockey WA's Premier League competition, Nelson plays for the University of Western Australia. In 2019, Nelson reached a career milestone and club record of 400 Premier League games.

=== AHL ===
Nelson made her debut in the Australian Hockey League (AHL) in 2001 as a member of the WAIS Diamonds. Nelson went on to represent the team until 2011, winning 5 national titles throughout her career.

=== International hockey ===
==== Under–21 ====
In 2000, Nelson made her debut for the Australia U–21 side at the Junior Oceania Cup in Canberra.

She went on to represent the team again in 2001 at the FIH Junior World Cup in Buenos Aires, where she won a bronze medal.

==== Hockeyroos ====
Nelson made her senior international debut for the Hockeyroos in 2002, during the FIH Champions Trophy in Macau.
