= Hellinikon Olympic Hockey Centre =

Sports venue in Athens, Greece

- Hellinikon Olympic Hockey Centre in 2017
- Interactive map of Hellinikon Olympic Hockey Centre
- Location: Elliniko-Argyroupoli, Athens, Greece
- Coordinates: 37.899942°N 23.726952°E
- Capacity: 7,200

Construction
- Opened: 2004

The Hellinikon Olympic Hockey Centre was the site of the field hockey events at the 2004 Summer Olympics in Athens. Located in the Hellinikon Olympic Complex, the facility consists of two hockey fields. The larger stadium seats 7,200 fans – though only 5,200 seats were made publicly available during the Games, and the smaller stadium seats 2,100 spectators – though only 1,200 seats were made publicly available during the Games. The facility was completed on 29 February 2004 and officially opened on 11 August 2004, shortly before the beginning of the Games.

During the 2004 Summer Paralympics, the Olympic Hockey Centre was the venue for Football 5-a-side and Football 7-a-side competitions.

The hockey centre has since fallen into disuse and disrepair. No hockey has been played at the centre since the end of the 2004 Olympic Games. However VVV H2 is planning to play in February 2025.
