= Mijntje Donners =

Dutch field hockey player

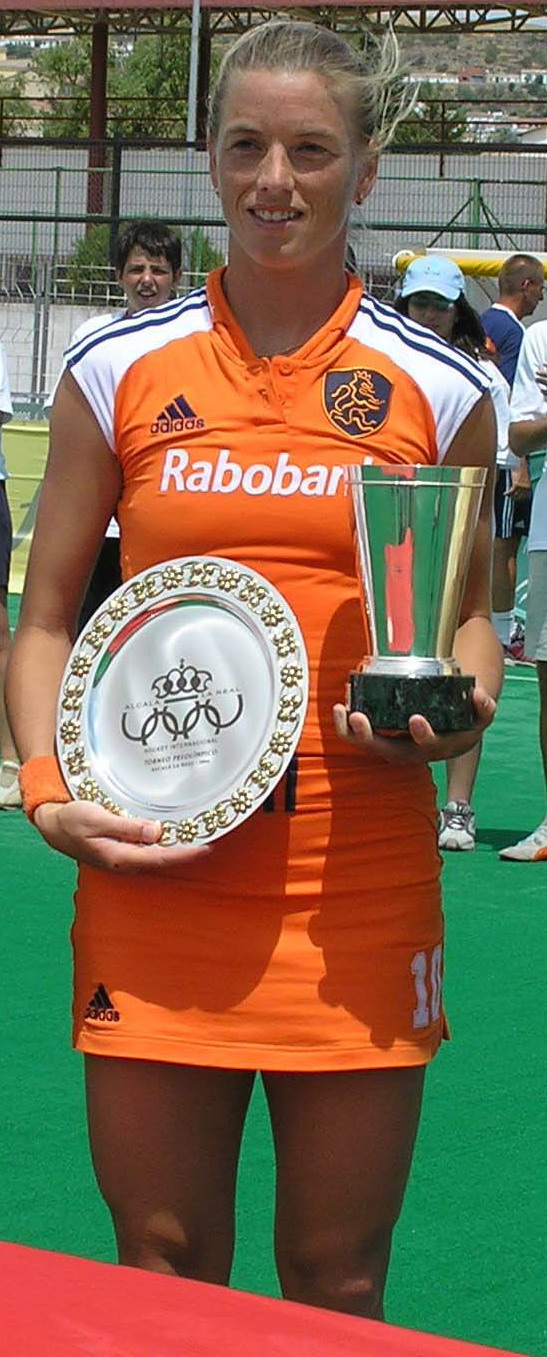

Medal record

Women's field hockey

Representing the Netherlands

Olympic Games
| Silver medal – second place | 2004 Athens | Team competition |
| Bronze medal – third place | 1996 Atlanta | Team competition |
| Bronze medal – third place | 2000 Sydney | Team competition |

World Cup
| Silver medal – second place | 1998 Utrecht | Team Competition |
| Silver medal – second place | 2002 Perth | Team Competition |

Champions Trophy
| Gold medal – first place | 2000 Amstelveen | Team Competition |
| Silver medal – second place | 1999 Brisbane | Team Competition |
| Silver medal – second place | 2001 Amstelveen | Team Competition |
| Bronze medal – third place | 2002 Macau | Team Competition |
| Bronze medal – third place | 2003 Sydney | Team Competition |

European Nations Cup
| Gold medal – first place | 1995 Amstelveen | Team Competition |
| Gold medal – first place | 1999 Cologne | Team Competition |
| Gold medal – first place | 2003 Barcelona | Team Competition |

Wilhelmina Petronella Ardina Maria ("Mijntje") Donners (born 4 February 1974 in Den Bosch, North Brabant) is a field hockey striker from the Netherlands, who played 234 international matches for the Dutch National Women's Team, in which she scored 97 goals.

Awards
| Preceded by (Argentina) Cecilia Rognoni | WorldHockey Player of the Year; 2003 | Succeeded by (Argentina) Luciana Aymar |
