= Brooke Morrison =

Australian field hockey player

Personal information
- Born: 3 January 1979 (age 47)
Medal record
Women's field hockey
Representing Australia
Commonwealth Games
Bronze medal – third place	2002 Manchester	Team competition

Brooke Morrison (born 3 January 1979 in New South Wales) is a retired female field hockey striker from Australia. She made her debut for the Australian women's national team during the 1998 season following an impressive season with the Australian U21 team at the 1997 Junior World Cup. Nicknamed Brooko she was a member of the Hockeyroos at the 2002 Commonwealth Games in Manchester, where the team placed third in the rankings.
