= Cecilia Rognoni =

Argentine field hockey player

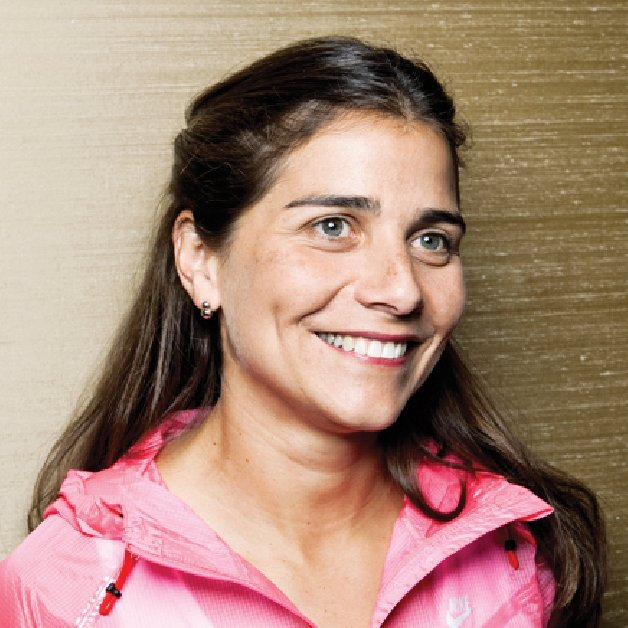
- Rognoni, 2011

Personal information
- Full name: María Cecilia Rognoni
- Born: 1 December 1976 (age 49) Buenos Aires, Argentina
- Height: 1.67 m (5 ft 6 in)

Sport
- Sport: Field hockey
- Position: Defender
Senior career
| Years | Team | Caps | Goals |
| –2005 | Club Ciudad de Buenos Aires | - | - |
National team
| Years | Team | Caps | Goals |
| 1994–1997 | Argentina U21 | | - |
| 1994–2004, 2010 | Argentina | 231 | - |
Medal record
Women's field hockey
Representing Argentina
Olympic Games
| Silver medal – second place | 2000 Sydney | Team |
| Bronze medal – third place | 2004 Athens | Team |
World Cup
| Gold medal – first place | 2002 Perth | Team |
Champions Trophy
| Gold medal – first place | 2001 Amstelveen | Team |
| Silver medal – second place | 2002 Macau | Team |
| Bronze medal – third place | 2004 Rosario | Team |
Pan American Games
| Gold medal – first place | 1999 Winnipeg | Team |
| Gold medal – first place | 2003 Santo Domingo | Team |
Pan American Cup
| Gold medal – first place | 2001 Kingston | Team |
Junior World Cup
| Bronze medal – third place | 1997 Seongnam | Team |
- Updated on 26 April 2013

María Cecilia Rognoni (born 1 December 1976, in Buenos Aires) is a retired Argentine field hockey player, who won the 2002 World Cup in Perth, Australia where she was elected as the best woman hockey player in the world by the FIH.

Cecilia belongs to the generation that gave rise to the myth of the Las Leonas. She won the silver medal at the 2000 Summer Olympics in Sydney, the bronze medal at the 2004 Summer Olympics in Athens and the Champions Trophy in 2001. In 2005, she was separated from the Argentine national field hockey team by the coach Gabriel Minadeo, after she said that "many of the players have a place on the team just because of their surname". She came back to the team in 2010 under Carlos Retegui coaching but was forced to leave the team due knee injuries.

She also played for Club Ciudad de Buenos Aires, and in the Netherlands for HC Rotterdam and HC Bloemendaal in the second division of the Netherlands.

== Honours ==
- 1994: Champion of the South American Tournament (Chile)
- 1995: 4th place at the Olympic Qualifying Tournament (Cape Town)
- 1996: 7th place at the 1996 Summer Olympics
- 1997: 3rd place at the Junior World Championships (Korea)
- 1998: 4th place at the World Championship (Ultrecht, Netherlands)
- 1999: Gold medal at the 1999 Pan American Games (Winnipeg, Canada)
- 1999: 4th place in the Champions Trophy (Brisbane)
- 2000: Silver Medal at the 2000 Summer Olympics
- 2001: Pan American Cup (Kingston, Jamaica)
- 2001: Champions Trophy (Amstelveen, Netherlands)
- 2001: Champion of the Three Nations Cup
- 2002: 2nd place at the Champions Trophy (Macau, China)
- 2002: World Cup (Perth, Australia)
- 2003: Champion of the Euro with the Rotterdam (Netherlands)
- 2003: 2003 Pan American Games (Santo Domingo, Dominican Republic)
- 2004: 2nd place four nations tournament Córdoba (Argentina)
- 2004: Bronze medal at the 2004 Summer Olympics
- 2004: 3rd place at the Champions Trophy (Rosario, Argentina)

=== Individual ===
- 1995 - Clarín Award Revelation (Field Hockey)
- 1997 - Top scorer in the junior Pan American Championship in Chile
- 1998 - Clarín Award Consecration (Field Hockey)
- 2000 - Gold Olimpia Award (Field Hockey) (National Team)
- 2001 - Pan American Cup scorer of Kingston, Jamaica
- 2002 - Best player of the tournament (Champions Trophy in Macau, China)
- 2002 - FIH Player of the Year Award
- 2002 - Clarín Award Consecration (Field Hockey)
- 2002 - Olimpia Award (Field Hockey)
- 2002 - Gold Olimpia Award (Best Athlete of the Year)

Awards
| Preceded by (Argentina) Luciana Aymar | WorldHockey Player of the Year; 2002 | Succeeded by (Netherlands) Mijntje Donners |
| Preceded by (Argentina) José Cóceres | Olimpia de Oro; 2002 | Succeeded by (Argentina) Manu Ginóbili |
