= Susannah Harris =

Australian field hockey player

Personal information
- Born: 21 May 1985 (age 41) Blaxland, New South Wales

Sport
- Sport: Field hockey
- Position: Forward
National team
Years	Team	Caps	Goals
2004–2005	Australia U–21	11	(2)
2002–2006	Australia	47	(8)
Medal record
Women's field hockey
Representing Australia
Junior Oceania Cup
Gold medal – first place	2004 Wellington	Team

Susannah Harris (born 21 May 1985) is a former field hockey player from Australia.

== Personal life ==
Susannah Harris was born and raised in Blaxland, New South Wales.

== Career ==
=== State level ===
In the Australian Hockey League, Harris plays representative hockey for her home state, for the NSW Arrows.

=== National teams ===
==== Under–21 ====
Harris made her debut for the 'Jillaroos' in 2004, at the Junior Oceania Cup in Wellington, New Zealand. Australia won gold at the tournament, qualifying for the Junior World Cup in Santiago, Chile.

In 2005, Harris again represented the Australian U–21 side at the Junior World Cup, where the team finished fourth.

==== Hockeyroos ====
At age 17, Harris made her debut for the Hockeyroos in 2002, at the Hockey World Cup in Perth, Western Australia.

Harris last represented Australia in 2006 during a four nations series in Córdoba, Argentina.

=== International goals ===
Goal	Date	Location	Opponent	Score	Result	Competition	Ref.
1	24 April 2004	State Netball and Hockey Centre, Melbourne, Australia	China	1–0	4–0	Test Match	
2	24 April 2004	State Netball and Hockey Centre, Melbourne, Australia	China	2–0	4–0	Test Match	
3	24 April 2004	State Netball and Hockey Centre, Melbourne, Australia	China	3–0	4–0	Test Match	
4	2 May 2004	Sunshine Coast Hockey Association, Buderim, Australia	India	4–0	9–2	Test Match	
5	2 May 2004	Sunshine Coast Hockey Association, Buderim, Australia	India	9–2	9–2	Test Match	
6	5 June 2005	USA National Training Centre, Virginia Beach, United States	United States	2–0	4–0	Test Match	
7	8 June 2005	USA National Training Centre, Virginia Beach, United States	United States	2–2	4–2	Test Match	
8	19 June 2005	West Vancouver Hockey Club, Vancouver, Canada	Canada	3–0	6–0	Test Match	
