= Emily Halliday =

Australian field hockey player

Personal information
- Full name: Emily Pia Halliday
- Born: 5 April 1979 (age 47) Perth, Western Australia

Sport
- Sport: Field hockey
- Position: Defender
National team
Years	Team	Caps	Goals
2001–2008	Australia	186	(19)
Medal record
Women's field hockey
Representing Australia
World Cup
Silver medal – second place	2006 Madrid	Team
Commonwealth Games
Gold medal – first place	2006 Melbourne	Team
Champions Trophy
Gold medal – first place	2003 Sydney	Team
Silver medal – second place	2005 Canberra	Team
Bronze medal – third place	2001 Amstelveen	Team

Emily Pia Halliday (born 5 April 1979) is a former Australian field hockey player.

Halliday played as a defender, and competed in the 2004 and 2008 Summer Olympics, in Athens and Beijing, respectively.

== Career ==
In 2001, Halliday made her debut for the Hockeyroos in a test series against Argentina in Rosario. That same year, she medalled with the Australian team twice, winning gold at the Oceania Cup and bronze at the Champions Trophy.

At the 2003 Champions Trophy, Halliday won her first gold medal at a major international tournament.

The most prolific year in Halliday's career was 2006, when she won gold and silver medals at the Commonwealth Games and World Cup respectively.

Halliday retired in 2009 for medical reasons.
