= Melanie Twitt =

Australian field hockey player

Personal information
- Nationality: Australian
- Born: 7 October 1977 (age 48)

Sport
- Sport: Field hockey
Medal record
Women's field hockey
Representing Australia
Commonwealth Games
Gold medal – first place	2006 Melbourne	Team

Melanie Twitt (born 7 October 1977) is an Australian field hockey player who competed in the 2004 Summer Olympics and in the 2008 Summer Olympics.
