= Joanne Banning =

Australian field hockey player

Medal record
Women's field hockey
Representing Australia
Commonwealth Games
Bronze medal – third place	2002 Manchester	Team competition

Joanne Banning (born 25 February 1977 in New South Wales) is a female field hockey striker from Australia, who made her debut for the Australian women's national team during the Argentina Tour in 2001. Nicknamed Joey she was a member of the Hockeyroos at the 2002 Commonwealth Games in Manchester, where the team ended up in third place in the overall-rankings.
