= Nicole Arrold =

Australian field hockey player

Personal information
- Born: 7 November 1981 (age 44) Canberra, Australian Capital Territory
- Height: 166 cm (5 ft 5 1/2 in)

Sport
- Sport: Field hockey
Medal record
Women's field hockey
Representing Australia
Commonwealth Games
Gold medal – first place	2006 Melbourne	Team
Gold medal – first place	2010 Delhi	Team

Nicole Arrold (born 7 November 1981) is an Australian field hockey player who competed in the 2004 Summer Olympics and in the 2008 Summer Olympics. She also participated at the Commonwealth Games where she won gold medals in 2006 and 2010 respectively.

Inaugural inductee to University of Canberra Sport Walk of Fame in 2022.
