= Suzie Muirhead =

New Zealand field hockey player

Personal information
- Born: Suzie Ngaire Pearce; 10 April 1975 (age 51) Whangārei, New Zealand
Medal record
Women's field hockey
Representing New Zealand
Commonwealth Games
Bronze medal – third place	1998 Kuala Lumpur	Team
Champions Challenge
Gold medal – first place	2005 Virginia Beach	Team

Suzie Ngaire Muirhead (née Pearce; born 10 April 1975) is a field hockey defender who was a member of the New Zealand team which finished sixth at the 2000 Summer Olympics in Sydney. She also competed with The Black Sticks at the 1998 and the 2002 Commonwealth Games, and at the 2004 Summer Olympics in Athens, where the team also finished sixth.

== International senior competitions ==
- 1998 – Commonwealth Games, Kuala Lumpur
- 1998 – World Cup, Utrecht
- 1999 – Champions Trophy, Brisbane
- 2000 – Olympic Qualifying Tournament, Milton Keynes
- 2000 – Champions Trophy, Amstelveen
- 2000 – Summer Olympics, Sydney
- 2001 – Champions Trophy, Amstelveen
- 2002 – Commonwealth Games, Manchester
- 2002 – Champions Trophy, Macau
- 2002 – World Cup, Perth
- 2003 – Champions Challenge, Catania
- 2004 – Olympic Qualifying Tournament, Auckland
- 2004 – Summer Olympics, Athens
- 2005 – Champions Challenge, Virginia Beach
- 2006 – Commonwealth Games, Melbourne
- 2006 – World Cup Qualifier, Rome
