= Ngaire Smith =

Australian field hockey player

Ngaire Smith (born 18 April 1979 in Melbourne, Victoria) is a former field hockey midfield and forward player from Australia, who earned a total number of 97 international caps for the Women's National Team, in which she scored 22 goals. Nicknamed Nige, she made her debut for the Australian Senior Team at the 2001 East Asian Games. In the AHL Smith played for the Azuma Vipers.

== International senior competitions ==
- 2001 – Champions Trophy, Amstelveen, Netherlands (3rd)
- 2002 – Commonwealth Games, Manchester, United Kingdom (3rd)
- 2002 – Champions Trophy, Macau, China (4th)
- 2002 – World Cup, Perth, Australia (4th)
- 2003 – Champions Trophy, Sydney, Australia (1st)
- 2004 – Champions Trophy, Rosario, Argentina (4th)
