= Suzie Faulkner =

Australian field hockey player

Personal information
- Born: 16 March 1979 (age 47)
Medal record
Women's field hockey
Representing Australia
World Cup
Silver medal – second place	2006 Madrid	Team competition
Commonwealth Games
Gold medal – first place	2006 Melbourne	Team competition

Suzanne ("Suzie") Margaret Faulkner (born 16 March 1979 in Brisbane, Queensland) is a field hockey striker from Australia, who made her debut for the Australian women's national team in 2002 during a Six Nations International Tournament. Nicknamed Wongy she was a member of the Hockeyroos at the 2004 Summer Olympics in Athens, Greece, where the team ended up in fifth place in the overall-rankings.
