= Wendy Beattie =

Australian field hockey player

Personal information
- Nationality: Australian
- Born: 18 September 1980 (age 45)

Sport
- Sport: Field hockey
Medal record
Women's field hockey
Representing Australia
Commonwealth Games
| Gold medal – first place | 2006 Melbourne | Team |

Wendy Beattie (born 18 September 1980) is an Australian field hockey player.
