= Peta Gallagher =

Australian field hockey player

Peta Gallagher (born 6 December 1977 in Canberra, Australian Capital Territory) is a female field hockey striker from Australia, who made her debut for the Australian women's national team during the Argentina Tour in 2001. Nicknamed Pete she was a member of the Hockeyroos at the 2004 Summer Olympics in Athens, Greece, where the team ended up in fifth place in the overall-rankings.
