= Karen Smith (Australian field hockey) =

Australian field hockey player

Personal information
- Born: 30 January 1979 (age 47) Toowoomba, Queensland
Medal record
Women's field hockey
Representing Australia
World Cup
Gold medal – first place	1998 Utrecht	Team
Silver medal – second place	2006 Madrid	Team
Commonwealth Games
Gold medal – first place	2006 Melbourne	Team
Bronze medal – third place	2002 Manchester	Team
Champions Trophy
Gold medal – first place	1997 Berlin	Team
Gold medal – first place	1999 Brisbane	Team
Gold medal – first place	2003 Sydney	Team
Silver medal – second place	2005 Canberra	Team
Bronze medal – third place	2000 Amstelveen	Team
Bronze medal – third place	2001 Amstelveen	Team

Karen Smith (born 30 January 1979 in Toowoomba, Queensland) is an Australian former field hockey midfield player. After her stint in hockey she went on to become a P.E. teacher for 4 years at Clairvaux MacKillop College. She is married with two children and resides in Toowoomba.

== International senior competitions ==
- 1997 – Champions Trophy, Berlin, Germany (1st)
- 1998 – World Cup, Utrecht, Netherlands (1st)
- 1999 – Champions Trophy, Brisbane, Australia (1st)
- 2000 – Champions Trophy, Amstelveen, Netherlands (3rd)
- 2001 – Champions Trophy, Amstelveen, Netherlands (3rd)
- 2002 – Commonwealth Games, Manchester, United Kingdom (3rd)
- 2002 – Champions Trophy, Macau, China (4th)
- 2002 – World Cup, Perth, Australia (4th)
- 2003 – Champions Trophy, Sydney, Australia (1st)
- 2004 – Summer Olympics, Athens, Greece (5th)
- 2004 – Champions Trophy, Rosario, Argentina (4th)
- 2005 – Champions Trophy, Canberra, Australia (2nd)
- 2006 – Commonwealth Games, Melbourne, Australia (1st)
- 2006 – Champions Trophy, Amstelveen, Netherlands (5th)
- 2006 – World Cup, Madrid, Spain (2nd)
