= Bianca Netzler (field hockey) =

Australian field hockey player

Personal information
- Born: 27 May 1976 (age 50)
Medal record
Women's field hockey
Representing Australia
Commonwealth Games
Bronze medal – third place	2002 Manchester	Team competition

Bianca Maree Netzler (born 27 May 1976 in Goulburn, New South Wales) is a female field hockey midfield player from Australia, who made her debut for the Australian women's national team at the Indira Gandhi Gold Cup in 1996. She was a member of the Hockeyroos at the 2004 Summer Olympics in Athens, Greece, where the team ended up in fifth place in the overall-rankings.
