= Angie Skirving =

Australian field hockey player

Personal information
- Born: Angela Robyn Skirving; 1 February 1981 (age 45) Toowoomba, Queensland, Australia
Medal record
Women's field hockey
Representing Australia
Olympic Games
Gold medal – first place	2000 Sydney	Team competition
World Cup
Silver medal – second place	2006 Madrid	Team competition
Champions Trophy
Gold medal – first place	2003 Sydney	Team Competition
Silver medal – second place	2005 Canberra	Team Competition
Bronze medal – third place	2000 Amstelveen	Team Competition
Bronze medal – third place	2001 Amstelveen	Team Competition
Commonwealth Games
Gold medal – first place	2006 Melbourne	Team competition
Bronze medal – third place	2002 Manchester	Team competition

Angela Robyn Lambert OAM (née Skirving; born 1 February 1981, in Toowoomba) is an Australian former field hockey player. She captained the under 21 Australian women's field hockey squad before entering the Hockeyroos in 1998 and in 2000 won gold at the Sydney Olympics. Angie went on to play in two more Olympic games and played over 225 games for Australia. Apart from playing in the Hockeyroos she played for the AHL Queensland Scorchers.

The youngest of the local Australian Representatives, Skirving began playing hockey at the age of 12 and was selected in the Queensland no.1 Rep. team when 13. She debuted for the Hockeyroos at 17. In 2001, she was named the winner of the International Hockey's Junior Player of the year, and was awarded the Order of Australia Medal OAM for services to sport in Australia. Skirving married Australian Kookaburras goalie Stephen Lambert in December 2006. The pair have been described as Australia's Golden Couple of Hockey.

In 2015, Lambert was named in the Queensland Scorchers Team of the Decade (2005–2015). and in 2019 was added to the QAS Hall of Fame.

Skirving played in the Brisbane Premier League 1 competition for Ascot Women's Hockey Club as a player coach winning Premierships in 2017 and 2021. Angie is currently playing in the Ascot Arana Hockey Club PL3 team for 2025, alongside her daughter. They have recently won the 2025 PL3 Premiership where her daughter, Lucia, won Player of the Final.

Awards
Preceded by Incumbent	WorldHockey Young Player of the Year; 2001	Succeeded by (Argentina) Agustina García
