= Louise Dobson =

Australian field hockey player

Louise Dobson OAM
Personal information
- Born: 1 September 1972 (age 53) Shepparton, Victoria, Australia
Medal record
Women's field hockey
Representing Australia
Olympic Games
Gold medal – first place	1996 Atlanta	Team
Commonwealth Games
Gold medal – first place	1998 Kuala Lumpur	Team
Bronze medal – third place	2002 Manchester	Team
Champions Trophy
Gold medal – first place	1997 Berlin	Team
Gold medal – first place	1999 Brisbane	Team
Gold medal – first place	2003 Sydney	Team
Bronze medal – third place	2000 Amstelveen	Team
Bronze medal – third place	2001 Amstelveen	Team

Louise "Lou" Dobson (born 1 September 1972) is a former field hockey player from Australia, who earned a total number of 230 international caps for the Australian Women's National Team, in which she scored 58 goals. She was a member of the squad, that won the gold medal at the 1996 Summer Olympics in Atlanta, United States.

== International senior competitions ==
- 1996 – Summer Olympics, Atlanta, United States (1st)
- 1997 – Champions Trophy, Berlin, Germany (1st)
- 1998 – Commonwealth Games, Kuala Lumpur, Malaysia (1st)
- 1999 – Champions Trophy, Brisbane, Australia (1st)
- 2000 – Champions Trophy, Amstelveen, Netherlands (3rd)
- 2001 – Champions Trophy, Amstelveen, Netherlands (3rd)
- 2002 – World Cup, Perth, Australia (4th)
- 2003 – Champions Trophy, Sydney, Australia (1st)
- 2004 – Summer Olympics, Athens, Greece (5th)
