= Julie Towers =

Australian field hockey player

Medal record

Women's field hockey

Representing Australia

Olympic Games
Gold medal – first place	2000 Sydney	Team

Commonwealth Games
Bronze medal – third place	2002 Manchester	Team

Julie Gail Towers OAM (born 12 October 1976 in Taree, New South Wales) is an Australian field hockey player. She was born in New South Wales. She won a gold medal at the 2000 Summer Olympics in Sydney.

Towers competed in the Gladiator Team Sports Challenge in 1995.
