= Katrina Powell =

Australian field hockey player

Katrina Powell OAM
Personal information
- Born: 8 April 1972 (age 54) Canberra, Australia
Medal record
Women's field hockey
Representing Australia
Olympic Games
Gold medal – first place	1996 Atlanta	Team
Gold medal – first place	2000 Sydney	Team
World Cup
Gold medal – first place	1998 Utrecht	Team
Champions Trophy
Gold medal – first place	1997 Berlin	Team
Gold medal – first place	1999 Brisbane	Team
Gold medal – first place	2003 Sydney	Team
Bronze medal – third place	2000 Amstelveen	Team
Bronze medal – third place	2001 Amstelveen	Team
Commonwealth Games
Gold medal – first place	1998 Kuala Lumpur	Team
Bronze medal – third place	2002 Manchester	Team
Junior World Cup
Silver medal – second place	1993 Barcelona	Team

Katrina Maree "Triny" Powell OAM (born 8 April 1972 in Canberra, Australian Capital Territory) is an Australian field hockey player. She represented Australia in three consecutive Summer Olympics, starting in 1996.

Powell was a member of the Australian Women's Hockey Team, known as the Hockeyroos, that won the gold medals at the 1996 and the 2000 Summer Olympics. Powell represented Australia 252 times, and scored 141 goals. She is the sister of Lisa Powell and the sister-in-law of Stuart Carruthers.

Powell was awarded the Medal of the Order of Australia (OAM) in the 1997 Australia Day Honours and the Australian Sports Medal in June 2000.

In March 2021, she was appointed Hockeyroos coach - the first female coach of the side in 43 years.
