= 2003 Women's EuroHockey Championship Qualifiers =

2003 Women's EuroHockey Nations Championship Qualifiers
Tournament details
- Host countries: Ireland; Lithuania; Spain
- Dates: 8 July – 15 September 2002
- Teams: 15 (from 1 confederation)
- Venue: 3 (in 3 host cities)

The 2003 Women's EuroHockey Nations Championship Qualifiers was a series of 3 qualification events for the 2003 EuroHockey Nations Championships in Barcelona. The tournaments were held in Ireland, Lithuania and Spain between 8 July and 15 September 2002.

The top team three teams from the two initial tournaments qualified directly to the EuroHockey Nations Championship. The fourth ranked teams from each tournament advanced to a play–off series to determine the final spot at the tournament.

== Qualifier 1 ==
Qualifier 1
Tournament details
- Host country: Ireland
- City: Dublin
- Dates: 8–14 July
- Venue: National Hockey Stadium

Final positions
- Champions: Ireland
- Runner-up: Scotland
- Third place: Italy

Tournament statistics
- Matches played: 20
- Goals scored: 105 (5.25 per match)

Qualifier 1 was held at the National Hockey Stadium in Dublin, from 8–14 July 2022.

=== Results ===
All times are local (IST).

==== Pool A ====
Pos	Team	Pld	W	D	L	GF	GA	GD	Pts	Qualification
1	Scotland	3	3	0	0	17	2	+15	9	Semifinals
2	Italy	3	1	1	1	12	3	+9	4	Semifinals
3	Belarus	3	1	1	1	8	7	+1	4	
4	Greece	3	0	0	3	1	26	−25	0	

Source: EuroHockey
Rules for classification: 1) points; 2) goal difference; 3) goals scored; 4) head-to-head result.

8 July 2002
13:00

Belarus	6–1	Greece
	Report

8 July 2002
15:00

Italy	1–2	Scotland
	Report

10 July 2002
11:00

Greece	0–10	Italy
	Report

10 July 2002
13:00

Belarus	1–5	Scotland
	Report

11 July 2002
13:00

Italy	1–1	Belarus
	Report

11 July 2002
15:00

Greece	0–10	Scotland
	Report

==== Pool B ====
Pos	Team	Pld	W	D	L	GF	GA	GD	Pts	Qualification
1	Ireland (H)	3	3	0	0	20	0	+20	9	Semifinals
2	France	3	2	0	1	11	3	+8	6	Semifinals
3	Poland	3	1	0	2	8	7	+1	3	
4	Finland	3	0	0	3	0	29	−29	0	

Source: EuroHockey
Rules for classification: 1) points; 2) goal difference; 3) goals scored; 4) head-to-head result.
(H) Hosts

8 July 2002
15:00

France	3–0	Poland
	Report

8 July 2002
17:00

Ireland	13–0	Finland
	Report

10 July 2002
17:00

France	8–0	Finland
	Report

10 July 2002
19:00

Poland	0–4	Ireland
	Report	Orbinson 2'; McMahon 4'; McVicker 22'; Sixsmith 33'

11 July 2002
19:00

Poland	8–0	Finland
	Report

11 July 2002
19:00

Ireland	3–0	France
McMahon 18'; Burke 39'; McVicker 51'	Report

==== Fifth to eighth place ====
Crossover
13 July
Belarus	8
Finland	0
13 July
Poland	6
Greece	0

Fifth place
14 July
Belarus	1
Poland (a.e.t)	2
Seventh place
14 July
Finland	1
Greece	2

===== Crossovers =====
13 July 2002
14:00

Belarus	8–0	Finland
	Report

13 July 2002
14:00

Poland	6–0	Greece
	Report

===== Seventh and eighth place =====
14 July 2002
14:00

Finland	1–2	Greece
	Report

===== Fifth and sixth place =====
14 July 2002
14:30

Belarus	1–2 (a.e.t.)	Poland
	Report

==== First to fourth place ====
Semi-finals
13 July
Scotland	3
France	0
13 July
Ireland	1
Italy	0

Final
14 July
Scotland	1
Ireland (a.e.t)	2
Third place
14 July
France	0
Italy	1

===== Crossovers =====
13 July 2002
09:00

Scotland	3–0	France
	Report

13 July 2002
09:00

Ireland	1–0	Italy
Burke 69'	Report

===== Third and fourth place =====
14 July 2002
09:00

France	0–1	Italy
	Report

===== Final =====
14 July 2002
16:30

Scotland	1–2 (a.e.t.)	Ireland
Simpson 67'	Report	McVicker 44', 79'

=== Final standings ===
As per statistical convention in field hockey, matches decided in extra time are counted as wins and losses, while matches decided by penalty shoot-outs are counted as draws.

Pos	Team	Pld	W	D	L	GF	GA	GD	Pts	Status
1st place, gold medalist(s)	Ireland (H)	5	5	0	0	23	1	+22	15	Qualified for 2003 EuroHockey Nations Championship
2nd place, silver medalist(s)	Scotland	5	4	0	1	21	4	+17	12	Qualified for 2003 EuroHockey Nations Championship
3rd place, bronze medalist(s)	Italy	5	2	1	2	13	4	+9	7	Qualified for 2003 EuroHockey Nations Championship
4	France	5	2	0	3	11	7	+4	6	Advance to Play–off Tournament
5	Poland	5	3	0	2	16	8	+8	9	
6	Belarus	5	2	1	2	17	9	+8	7	
7	Greece	5	1	0	4	3	33	−30	3	
8	Finland	5	0	0	5	1	39	−38	0	

Source: EuroHockey
(H) Hosts

== Qualifier 2 ==
Qualifier 2
Tournament details
- Host country: Lithuania
- City: Šiauliai
- Dates: 8–14 July
- Venue: Klevas Stadium

Final positions
- Champions: Ukraine
- Runner-up: Azerbaijan
- Third place: Wales

Tournament statistics
- Matches played: 15
- Goals scored: 56 (3.73 per match)

Qualifier 2 was held at the Klevas Stadium in Šiauliai, from 8–14 July 2002.

=== Results ===
All times are local (EEST).

==== Pool A ====
Pos	Team	Pld	W	D	L	GF	GA	GD	Pts	Qualification
1	Ukraine	3	3	0	0	7	3	+4	9	Semifinals
2	Azerbaijan	3	2	0	1	7	2	+5	6	Semifinals
3	Czech Republic	3	1	0	2	3	4	−1	3	
4	Austria	3	0	0	3	1	9	−8	0	

Source: EuroHockey
Rules for classification: 1) points; 2) goal difference; 3) goals scored; 4) head-to-head result.

8 July 2002
13:00

Austria	1–2	Ukraine
	Report

8 July 2002
15:00

Azerbaijan	1–0	Czech Republic
	Report

9 July 2002
13:00

Czech Republic	1–0	Austria
	Report

9 July 2002
15:00

Ukraine	2–0	Azerbaijan
	Report

11 July 2002
14:00

Austria	0–6	Azerbaijan
	Report

11 July 2002
16:00

Czech Republic	2–3	Ukraine
	Report

==== Pool B ====
Pos	Team	Pld	W	D	L	GF	GA	GD	Pts	Qualification
1	Belgium	2	1	0	1	4	4	0	3	Semifinals
2	Wales	2	1	0	1	3	3	0	3	Semifinals
3	Lithuania (H)	2	1	0	1	2	2	0	3	

Source: EuroHockey
Rules for classification: 1) points; 2) goal difference; 3) goals scored; 4) head-to-head result.
(H) Hosts

8 July 2002
18:00

Lithuania	0–1	Wales
	Report

10 July 2002
18:00

Wales	2–3	Belgium
	Report

12 July 2002
10:30

Belgium	1–2	Lithuania
	Report

==== Fifth to eighth place ====
Crossover
13 July
Lithuania	5
Austria	2

Fifth place
14 July
Czech Republic	2
Lithuania	4

===== Crossover =====
13 July 2002
12:00

Lithuania	5–2	Austria
	Report

===== Fifth and sixth place =====
14 July 2002
10:00

Czech Republic	2–4	Lithuania
	Report

==== First to fourth place ====
Semi-finals
13 July
Ukraine	2
Wales	1
13 July
Belgium	2
Azerbaijan (a.e.t)	3

Final
14 July
Ukraine	4
Azerbaijan	1
Third place
14 July
Wales	2
Belgium	1

===== Semi-finals =====
13 July 2002
14:30

Ukraine	2–1	Wales
	Report

13 July 2002
12:00

Belgium	2–3 (a.e.t.)	Azerbaijan
	Report

===== Third and fourth place =====
14 July 2002
12:30

Wales	2–1	Belgium
	Report

===== Final =====
14 July 2002
15:00

Ukraine	4–1	Azerbaijan
	Report

=== Final standings ===
As per statistical convention in field hockey, matches decided in extra time are counted as wins and losses, while matches decided by penalty shoot-outs are counted as draws.

Pos	Team	Pld	W	D	L	GF	GA	GD	Pts	Status
1st place, gold medalist(s)	Ukraine	5	5	0	0	13	5	+8	15	Qualified for 2003 EuroHockey Nations Championship
2nd place, silver medalist(s)	Azerbaijan	5	3	0	2	11	8	+3	9	Qualified for 2003 EuroHockey Nations Championship
3rd place, bronze medalist(s)	Wales	4	2	0	2	6	6	0	6	Qualified for 2003 EuroHockey Nations Championship
4	Belgium	4	1	0	3	7	9	−2	3	Advance to Play–off Tournament
5	Lithuania (H)	4	3	0	1	11	6	+5	9	
6	Czech Republic	4	1	0	3	5	8	−3	3	
7	Austria	4	0	0	4	3	14	−11	0	

Source: EuroHockey
(H) Hosts

== Play–offs ==
Play–offs
Tournament details
- Host country: Spain
- City: Terrassa
- Dates: 13–15 September
- Venue: Estadi Martí Colomer

Final positions
- Champions: France
- Runner-up: Belgium

Tournament statistics
- Matches played: 3
- Goals scored: 7 (2.33 per match)

The play–off competition was held at the Estadi Martí Colomer in Terrassa, from 13–15 September 2022.

=== Results ===
All times are local (CEST).

==== Standings ====
Pos	Team	Pld	W	D	L	GF	GA	GD	Pts	Qualification
1	France	3	2	1	0	5	2	+3	7	Qualified for 2003 EuroHockey Nations Championship
2	Belgium	3	0	1	2	2	5	−3	1	

Source: EuroHockey
Rules for classification: 1) points; 2) goal difference; 3) goals scored; 4) head-to-head result.

==== Fixtures ====
13 September 2002
17:00

France	2–0	Belgium
	Report

Umpires:
Mónica Rivera (ESP)
Belén Gonzales (ESP)

13 September 2002
15:00

Belgium	0–0	France
	Report

Umpires:
Belén Gonzales (ESP)
Mónica Rivera (ESP)

13 September 2002
09:30

France	3–2	Belgium
	Report

Umpires:
Mónica Rivera (ESP)
Belén Gonzales (ESP)
