= 2007 Women's Hockey Setanta Sports Trophy =

Setanta Sports Trophy
Tournament details
- Host country: (Republic of Ireland) Ireland
- City: Dublin
- Teams: 4 (from 2 confederations)
- Venue: University College Dublin

Final positions
- Champions: Germany (1st title)
- Runner-up: South Africa
- Third place: Ireland

Tournament statistics
- Matches played: 8
- Goals scored: 26 (3.25 per match)
- Top scorer: (Germany) Maike Stöckel (4 goals)
- Best player: (Germany) Fanny Rinne

The 2007 Women's Hockey Setanta Sports Trophy was the first edition of the Setanta Sports Trophy, a women's field hockey tournament. It was held in Dublin, Ireland, from June 13 to 17, 2007, and featured four of the top nations in women's field hockey.

The tournament was held simultaneously with the men's competition.

== Competition format ==
The tournament featured the national teams of Germany, Scotland, South Africa, and the hosts, Ireland, competing in a round-robin format, with each team playing each other once. Three points were awarded for a win, one for a draw, and none for a loss.

Country	December 2006 FIH Ranking	Best World Cup finish	Best Olympic Games finish
Germany	4	Champions (1976, 1981)	Champions (2004)
Ireland	14	Eleventh Place (1994)	Never qualified.
Scotland	17	Eighth Place (1983)	Third Place (1992)
South Africa	12	Seventh place (1998)	Ninth place (2004)

== Officials ==
The following umpires were appointed by the International Hockey Federation to officiate the tournament:

- Maggie Conacher (SCO)
- Corrine Cornelius (RSA)
- Carol Metchette (IRE)
- Petra Müller (GER)
- Dino Willox (WAL)

== Results ==
All times are local (Irish Standard Time).

=== Preliminary round ===
Pos	Team	Pld	W	D	L	GF	GA	GD	Pts	Qualification
1	Germany	3	3	0	0	12	1	+11	9	Advanced to Final
2	South Africa	3	1	1	1	2	2	0	4	Advanced to Final
3	Ireland (H)	3	0	2	1	1	3	−2	2	
4	Scotland	3	0	1	2	1	10	−9	1	

Source: Deutscher Hockey-Bund
Rules for classification: 1) points; 2) goal difference; 3) goals scored; 4) head-to-head result.
(H) Hosts

==== Fixtures ====
13 June 2007
18:00

Ireland	0–0	South Africa
	Report

Umpires:
Dino Willox (WAL)
Petra Müller (GER)

14 June 2007
17:00

Germany	8–0	Scotland
Hoffmann 8', 56', 68'; Stöckel 21', 64'; Keller 41'; Rodewald 53'; Rinne 65'	Report

Umpires:
Corrine Cornelius (RSA)
Carol Metchette (IRE)

15 June 2007
13:00

South Africa	0–1	Germany
	Report	Müller 62'

Umpires:
Maggie Conacher (SCO)
Dino Willox (WAL)

15 June 2007
17:00

Ireland	0–0	Scotland
	Report

Umpires:
Petra Müller (GER)
Corrine Cornelius (RSA)

16 June 2007
13:00

South Africa	2–1	Scotland
Wilson 51'; Bailey 65'	Report	Judge 40'

Umpires:
Carol Metchette (IRE)
Petra Müller (GER)

16 June 2007
15:00

Germany	3–1	Ireland
Stöckel 22'; Rinne 43'; Beermann 47'	Report	Caulfield 10'

Umpires:
Dino Willox (WAL)
Maggie Conacher (SCO)

=== Classification round ===
==== Third and fourth place ====
17 June 2007
09:00

Ireland	2–1	Scotland
Flynn 26'; Sargent 61'	Report	Clement 18'

Umpires:
Dino Willox (WAL)
Corrine Cornelius (RSA)

==== Final ====
17 June 2007
11:25

Germany	5–2	South Africa
Stöckel 4'; Keller 18'; Kühn 58'; Rinne 60'; Müller 70'	Report	Bailey 52'; Marescia 64'

Umpires:
Carol Metchette (IRE)
Maggie Conacher (SCO)

== Statistics ==
=== Final standings ===
Pos	Team	Pld	W	D	L	GF	GA	GD	Pts	Status
1st place, gold medalist(s)	Germany	4	4	0	0	17	3	+14	12	Tournament Champion
2nd place, silver medalist(s)	South Africa	4	1	1	2	4	7	−3	4	
3rd place, bronze medalist(s)	Ireland (H)	4	1	2	1	3	4	−1	5	
4	Scotland	4	0	1	3	2	12	−10	1	

Source: Deutscher Hockey-Bund
(H) Hosts

=== Goalscorers ===
There were 26 goals scored in 8 matches, for an average of 3.25 goals per match.

4 goals

- (Germany) Maike Stöckel

3 goals

- (Germany) Eileen Hoffmann
- (Germany) Fanny Rinne

2 goals

- (Germany) Natascha Keller
- (Germany) Julia Müller
- (South Africa) Sharne Bailey

1 goal

- (Germany) Janine Beermann
- (Germany) Anke Kühn
- (Germany) Marion Rodewald
- (Ireland) Linda Caulfield
- (Ireland) Róisín Flynn
- (Ireland) Cliodhna Sargent
- (Scotland) Linda Clement
- (Scotland) Samantha Judge
- (South Africa) Marsha Marescia
- (South Africa) Jennifer Wilson
