= Linda Caulfield =

Irish field hockey player (born 1982)

Linda Maher
Personal information
- Born: 3 March 1979 (age 47) Wexford, Ireland
- Height: 177 cm (5 ft 10 in)

Sport
- Sport: Field hockey
- Position: Midfield
National team
| Years | Team | Caps | Goals |
| 1999–2007 | Ireland | 151 | (–) |

Linda Maher (née Caulfield) (born 3 March 1979) is a retired field hockey player from Ireland.

== Personal life ==
Maher was born in Wexford, Ireland.

She is married to William Maher, an Irish hurler.

== Career ==
She made her international debut for the Green Army in 1999. She earned her first senior cap during a test match against Russia.

Major International Tournaments

During her career, she represented the squad at a number of major tournaments, amassing 151 caps for the national team. These tournaments included:

- 1999 EuroHockey Championships – Cologne
- 2001 Intercontinental Cup – Amiens and Abbeville
- 2002 FIH World Cup – Perth
- 2003 EuroHockey Championships – Barcelona
- 2004 FIH Olympic Qualifiers – Auckland
- 2005 EuroHockey Championships – Dublin
- 2006 Intercontinental Cup – Rome
- 2007 EuroHockey Championships – Manchester

After the retirement of teammate and captain, Lynsey McVicker, following the 2005 EuroHockey Championships in Dublin, Caulfield succeeded her and took over captaincy of the national team. She served as captain until her retirement in 2007, at the conclusion of the 2007 EuroHockey Championships in Manchester.
