= 2003 Women's EuroHockey Nations Championship =

International field hockey competition

Tournament details
- Host country: Spain
- City: Barcelona
- Dates: 1 – 13 September 2003
- Teams: 12

Final positions
- Champions: Netherlands (5th title)
- Runner-up: Spain
- Third place: Germany

Tournament statistics
- Matches played: 42
- Goals scored: 210 (5 per match)
- Top scorer: (Netherlands) Mijntje Donners (11 goals)

The 2003 Women's EuroHockey Nations Championship was the sixth edition of the women's field hockey championship organised by the European Hockey Federation. It was held from 1 until 13 September 2003 in Barcelona, Spain. This was the last EuroHockey Nations Championship with 12 teams. The 4 teams ending 9th, 10th, 11th, and 12th were relegated to the first EuroHockey Nations Trophy. The 8 remaining teams played in the 2005 Women's EuroHockey Nations Championship.

== Qualified teams ==
Dates	Event	Location	Quotas	Qualifiers
–	Host Nation		1	Spain
18–29 August 1999	1999 EuroHockey Championship	Cologne, Germany	4	England; Netherlands; Germany; Russia
8–14 July 2002	EuroHockey Championship Qualifiers	Dublin, Ireland	3	Ireland; Italy; Scotland
8–14 July 2002	EuroHockey Championship Qualifiers	Šiauliai, Lithuania	3	Azerbaijan; Ukraine; Wales
13–15 September 2002	Play–off Tournament	Terrassa, Spain	1	France
Total			12	

== Format ==
The twelve teams were split into two groups of six teams. The top two teams advanced to the semi-finals in order to determine the winner in a knockout system. The 3rd and 4th placed teams from each pool played for the 5th to 8th place, while the 5th and 6th placed teams from each pool played for the 9th to 12th place. The last four teams were relegated to the EuroHockey Nations Challenge.

== Results ==
All times were local (UTC+2).

=== Preliminary round ===
==== Pool A ====
Pos	Team	Pld	W	D	L	GF	GA	GD	Pts	Qualification
1	Netherlands	5	5	0	0	40	2	+38	15	Semifinals
2	Spain	5	4	0	1	16	3	+13	12	Semifinals
3	Scotland	5	2	0	3	9	16	−7	6	
4	France	5	2	0	3	6	15	−9	6	
5	Azerbaijan	5	1	1	3	6	17	−11	4	
6	Russia	5	0	1	4	3	27	−24	1	

Source: EuroHockey
Rules for classification: 1) points; 2) goal difference; 3) goals scored; 4) head-to-head result.

2 September 2003
13:00

Azerbaijan	1–1	Russia
	Report

2 September 2003
15:00

France	0–7	Netherlands
	Report	Donners 7', 35'; De Bruijn 22', 61'; Lammers 29', 32'; Scheepstra 46'

2 September 2003
19:00

Scotland	0–3	Spain
	Report	Tellería 3'; Camón 8'; Muñoz 13'

4 September 2003
10:00

Russia	2–6	Scotland
	Report

4 September 2003
12:00

Netherlands	12–1	Azerbaijan
Van Geenhuizen 4', 44'; Donners 13', 27', 39', 65'; Boomgaardt 16', 42'; Booij 20', 54'; Moreira de Melo 32'; Kooijman 57'	Report

4 September 2003
18:00

Spain	5–1	France
	Report

5 September 2003
12:00

Scotland	0–7	Netherlands
	Report	Boomgaardt 11'; Donners 12', 32', 39'; Lammers 22', 45'; Schopman 58'

5 September 2003
17:00

Azerbaijan	1–2	France
	Report

5 September 2003
20:00

Russia	0–6	Spain
	Report

7 September 2003
10:00

France	1–2	Scotland
	Report

7 September 2003
12:00

Spain	1–0	Azerbaijan
	Report

7 September 2003
13:00

Netherlands	12–0	Russia
Scheepstra 9'; Donners 15'; Boomgaardt 19', 49', 54'; Booij 22'; Van Kessel 47', 59'; Smabers 50', 61'; Van de Vaart 57'; De Bruijn 62'	Report

8 September 2003
13:00

Scotland	1–3	Azerbaijan
Carroll 53'	Report

8 September 2003
15:00

Russia	0–2	France
	Report

8 September 2003
17:00

Netherlands	2–1	Spain
Booij 35'; Van Geenhuizen 46'	Report

==== Pool B ====
Pos	Team	Pld	W	D	L	GF	GA	GD	Pts	Qualification
1	England	5	5	0	0	26	1	+25	15	Semifinals
2	Germany	5	4	0	1	25	9	+16	12	Semifinals
3	Ireland	5	2	1	2	4	9	−5	7	
4	Ukraine	5	1	2	2	13	20	−7	5	
5	Italy	5	1	1	3	8	22	−14	4	
6	Wales	5	0	0	5	2	17	−15	0	

Source: EuroHockey
Rules for classification: 1) points; 2) goal difference; 3) goals scored; 4) head-to-head result.

1 September 2003
11:00

Germany	8–3	Ukraine
Klecker 4', 58'; Rinne 21'; Reiter 29'; Ernsting-Krienke 43', 67'; Haase 56'; Casaretto 69'	Report	Kolomiyets 17'; Salenko 18'; Vynohradova 47'

1 September 2003
15:00

Ireland	1–0	Wales
McVicker 24'	Report

1 September 2003
18:00

England	8–0	Italy
Smith 7', 68'; Walker 24'; Bennett 43'; Grant 48'; King 52'; Clewlow 55'; Wright 62'	Report

3 September 2003
10:00

Italy	1–2	Ireland
Carradori 58'	Report	Cregan 4'; McVicker 32'

3 September 2003
13:00

Wales	0–4	Germany
	Report	Keller 12', 38', 56'; Böhmert 16'

3 September 2003
17:00

Ukraine	0–5	England
	Report	Walker 4'; R. Walsh 17'; King 22', 49'; Bennett 59'

5 September 2003
10:00

England	5–0	Wales
	Report

5 September 2003
13:00

Germany	4–0	Ireland
Ernsting-Krienke 7'; Klecker 45'; Reiter 56'; Kollmar 66'	Report

5 September 2003
15:00

Ukraine	4–4	Italy
	Report

6 September 2003
15:00

England	5–1	Germany
Grant 12'; Clewlow 33'; Wright 38'; King 39'; J. Smith 63'	Report	Rinne 70'

6 September 2003
17:00

Ukraine	1–1	Ireland
Litvinchuk 20'	Report	McVicker 48'

6 September 2003
18:00

Wales	0–2	Italy
	Report

8 September 2003
09:00

Wales	2–5	Ukraine
	Report

8 September 2003
09:00

Ireland	0–3	England
	Report	J. Smith 7'; Bennett 44'; Grant 70'

8 September 2003
11:00

Italy	1–8	Germany
Carradori 50'	Report	Gude 7', 46'; Keller 10', 45'; Reiter 18'; Klecker 33'; Böhmert 42'; Ernsting-Krienke 62'

== fifth to twelfth place classification ==
5th place bracket

5th–8th place semifinals
11 September
Ukraine	3
Scotland	2
11 September
Ireland	4
France	2

5th place
12 September
Ukraine	3
Ireland	0
7th place
11 September
Scotland	2
France	1

9th place bracket

9th–12th place semifinals
10 September
Azerbaijan	2
Wales	1
10 September
Russia	4
Italy	1

9th place
12 September
Azerbaijan	3
Russia	2
11th place
12 September
Italy	3
Wales	2

=== 5th–8th place semifinals ===
11 September 2003

Scotland	2–3	Ukraine
Fraser 35'; Simpson 38'	Report	Kobzenko 26'; Vasyukova 43'; Litvinchuk 70'

11 September 2003

Ireland	4–2	France
Burke 38', 60'; McVicker 40'; Bateman 44'	Report	Bergere 5', 20'

=== 9th–12th place semifinals ===
10 September 2003

Azerbaijan	2–1	Wales

10 September 2003

Russia	4–1	Italy

=== 11th place game ===
12 September 2003

Italy	3–2	Wales

=== 9th place game ===
12 September 2003

Azerbaijan	3–2	Russia

=== 7th place game ===
12 September 2003

Scotland	2–1	France

=== 5th place game ===
12 September 2003

Ukraine	3–0	Ireland

=== First to fourth place classification ===
Semi-finals
11 September 2003
Netherlands	5
Germany	1
11 September 2003
England	1 (2)
Spain (pen.)	1 (3)

Final
13 September 2003
Netherlands	5
Spain	0
Third Place
13 September 2003
Germany	3
England	1

==== Semifinals ====
11 September 2003
11:30

Netherlands	5–1	Germany
Moreira de Melo 2'; Van der Vaart 21'; Van Geenhuizen 27'; Booij 54'; Donners 69'	Report	Rinne 8'

11 September 2003
14:30

England	1–1	Spain
Ellis 7'	Report	Camón 31'
Penalties
Walker (penalty shoot-out missed); King (penalty shoot-out missed); Clewlow (penalty shoot-out missed); Walsh (penalty shoot-out scored); Wright (penalty shoot-out scored) —— Walsh (penalty shoot-out missed)	2–3	(penalty shoot-out missed) López; (penalty shoot-out missed) Camón; (penalty shoot-out scored) Muñoz; (penalty shoot-out missed) Manrique; (penalty shoot-out scored) Del Mar Feito —— (penalty shoot-out scored) López

==== Third and fourth place ====
13 September 2003
10:30

Germany	3–1	England
Rinne 2', 33', 42'	Report	J. Smith 41'

==== Final ====
13 September 2003
13:00

Netherlands	5–0	Spain
Donners 4', 22'; Lammers 30'; Booij 49'; Van Geenhuizen 54'	Report

== Final standings ==
As per statistical convention in field hockey, matches decided in extra time are counted as wins and losses, while matches decided by penalty shoot-outs are counted as draws.

Pos	Team	Pld	W	D	L	GF	GA	GD	Pts	Status
1st place, gold medalist(s)	Netherlands	7	7	0	0	50	3	+47	21	Qualified for 2004 Summer Olympics
2nd place, silver medalist(s)	Spain (H)	7	4	1	2	17	9	+8	13	
3rd place, bronze medalist(s)	Germany	7	5	0	2	29	15	+14	15	
4	England	7	5	1	1	28	5	+23	16	
5	Ukraine	7	3	2	2	19	22	−3	11	
6	Ireland	7	3	1	3	8	14	−6	10	
7	Scotland	7	3	0	4	13	20	−7	9	
8	France	7	2	0	5	9	21	−12	6	
9	Azerbaijan	7	3	1	3	11	20	−9	10	Relegated to EuroHockey Nations Trophy
10	Russia	7	1	1	5	9	31	−22	4	Relegated to EuroHockey Nations Trophy
11	Italy	7	2	1	4	12	28	−16	7	Relegated to EuroHockey Nations Trophy
12	Wales	7	0	0	7	5	22	−17	0	Relegated to EuroHockey Nations Trophy

Source: EuroHockey2003
(H) Hosts

== Goalscorers ==
There were 210 goals scored in 42 matches, for an average of 5 goals per match.

11 goals

- (Netherlands) Mijntje Donners

9 goals

- (Netherlands) Ageeth Boomgaardt

7 goals

- (France) Peggy Bergere
- (Netherlands) Kim Lammers

6 goals

- (England) Jane Smith
- (Germany) Fanny Rinne
- (Italy) Giorga Carradori

5 goals

- (Germany) Natascha Keller
- (Netherlands) Minke Booij
- (Spain) Núria Camón

4 goals

- (Azerbaijan) Dilfuza Kenzayeva
- (England) Anna Bennett
- (England) Helen Grant
- (England) Leisa King
- (Germany) Nadine Ernsting-Krienke
- (Germany) Denise Klecker
- (Ireland) Lynsey McVicker
- (Netherlands) Miek van Geenhuizen
- (Russia) Marina Chegurdaeva
- (Spain) Silvia Muñoz
- (Ukraine) Zhanna Savenko

3 goals

- (Azerbaijan) Zeynab Nuriyeva
- (England) Lucilla Wright
- (Germany) Cornelia Reiter
- (Netherlands) Chantal de Bruijn
- (Russia) Nadejda Chegurdaeva
- (Scotland) Susan Gilmour
- (Scotland) Kathryn Gray
- (Ukraine) Maryna Litvinchuk
- (Ukraine) Natalya Vasyukova
- (Ukraine) Maryna Vynohradova

2 goals

- (Azerbaijan) Mutiavon Askarova
- (England) Melanie Clewlow
- (England) Rachel Walker
- (Germany) Anneke Böhmert
- (Germany) Franziska Gude
- (Ireland) Jennifer Burke
- (Italy) Dolores Miranda
- (Italy) Sonia Scalia
- (Netherlands) Lieve van Kessel
- (Netherlands) Fatima Moreira de Melo
- (Netherlands) Maartje Scheepstra
- (Netherlands) Minke Smabers
- (Netherlands) Macha van der Vaart
- (Scotland) Rhona Simpson
- (Scotland) Cheryl Valentine
- (Spain) Maider Tellería
- (Ukraine) Maryna Dudko
- (Ukraine) Tetyana Kobzenko
- (Wales) Nia Fowler

1 goal

- (Azerbaijan) Inoyathon Jafarova
- (Azerbaijan) Zarifahon Zeynalova
- (England) Alexandra Danson
- (England) Joanne Ellis
- (England) Kate Walsh
- (France) Emilie Bellet
- (France) Gaelle Verrier
- (Germany) Caroline Casaretto
- (Germany) Mandy Haase
- (Germany) Alexandra Kollmar
- (Ireland) Karen Bateman
- (Ireland) Eimear Cregan
- (Italy) Alessandra Filippi
- (Italy) Laura García
- (Netherlands) Janneke Schopman
- (Russia) Olga Shentsova
- (Russia) Irina Sviridova
- (Scotland) Louise Carroll
- (Scotland) Linda Clement
- (Scotland) Julie Kilpatrick
- (Spain) María del Mar Feito
- (Spain) Erdoitza Goikoetxea
- (Spain) Silvia Manrique
- (Spain) María Isabel Martínez
- (Spain) Ana Pérez
- (Spain) Rocío Ybarra
- (Ukraine) Sviltana Kolomiyets
- (Ukraine) Tetyana Salenko
- (Wales) Charlotte Merret
- (Wales) Georgina Sharples
- (Wales) Sarah Thomas

Source: EHF

== See also ==
- 2003 Men's EuroHockey Nations Championship
