= Jo Ellis (field hockey) =

British field hockey player

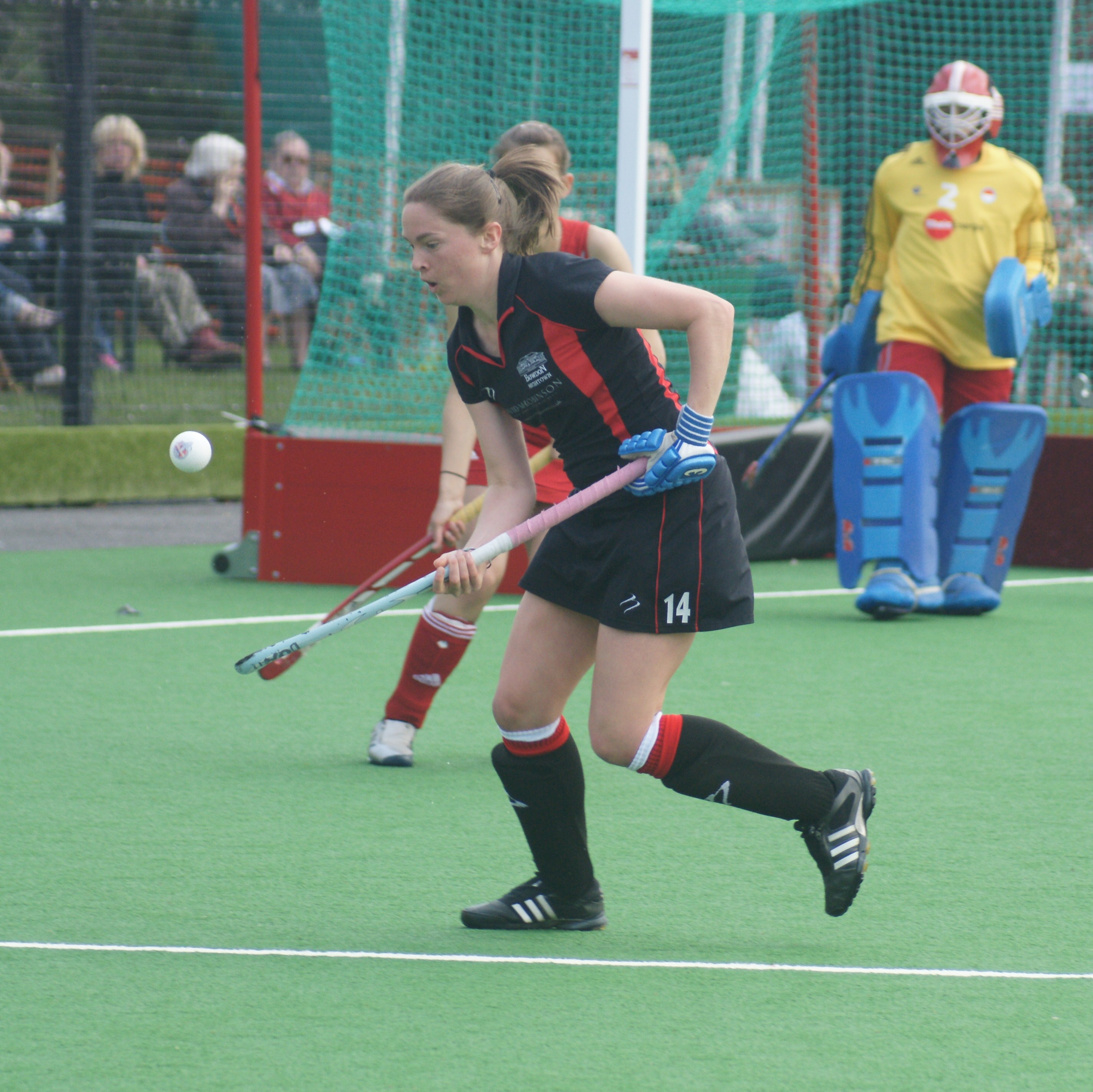

Medal record

Women's field hockey

Representing England

European Championship
Bronze medal – third place	2007 Manchester	Team

Champions Challenge
Bronze medal – third place	2007 Baku	Team

Joanne Ellis (born 10 November 1983 in Leeds, West Yorkshire) is an English field hockey international, who was a member of the England and Great Britain women's field hockey team since 2006. She is not to be confused with another English field hockey player named Joanne Ellis. She started her hockey career at Royston hockey club.
