= 2005 Women's EuroHockey Nations Championship =

International field hockey competition

Tournament details
- Host country: Ireland
- City: Dublin
- Dates: 14 – 20 August 2005
- Teams: 8

Final positions
- Champions: Netherlands (6th title)
- Runner-up: Germany
- Third place: England

Tournament statistics
- Matches played: 20
- Goals scored: 72 (3.6 per match)
- Top scorer: (Germany) Fanny Rinne (7 goals)
- Best player: (Netherlands) Maartje Scheepstra
- Best goalkeeper: (Spain) María Jesús Rosa

The 2005 Women's EuroHockey Nations Championship was the 7th edition of the women's field hockey championship organised by the European Hockey Federation. It was held from 14 to 20 August 2005 in Dublin, Ireland.

== Qualified teams ==
- England
- France
- Germany
- Ireland
- Netherlands
- Scotland
- Spain
- Ukraine

== Format ==
The eight teams were split into two groups of four teams. The top two teams advanced to the semifinals in order to determine the winner in a knockout system. The bottom two teams played in a new group with the teams they did not play against in the group stage. The last two teams were relegated to the EuroHockey Nations Challenge.

== Results ==
All times were local (UTC+0).

=== Preliminary round ===
==== Pool A ====
Pos	Team	Pld	W	D	L	GF	GA	GD	Pts	Qualification
1	Netherlands	3	3	0	0	12	0	+12	9	Semifinals
2	Spain	3	1	1	1	6	3	+3	4	Semifinals
3	Ireland (H)	3	1	1	1	1	4	−3	4	
4	France	3	0	0	3	0	12	−12	0	

Source: EuroHockey
Rules for classification: 1) points; 2) goal difference; 3) goals scored; 4) head-to-head result.
(H) Hosts

14 August 2005
15:45

Netherlands	3–0	Spain
Paumen 3'; Lammers 19'; Karres 43'	Report

Umpires:
Alison Hill (ENG)
Minka Woolley (AUS)

14 August 2005
17:45

Ireland	1–0	France
Caulfield 5'	Report

Umpires:
Tetyana Kaltypan (UKR)
Anne McRae (SCO)

16 August 2005
17:00

Netherlands	5–0	France
Lammers 36', 45', 65'; Karres 38'; Paumen 51'	Report

Umpires:
Heike Malina (GER)
Tetyana Kaltypan (UKR)

16 August 2005
19:00

Spain	0–0	Ireland
	Report

Umpires:
Anne McRae (SCO)
Alison Hill (ENG)

17 August 2005
17:00

Spain	6–0	France
Muñoz 8', 19'; Antona 31'; Malda 42'; Prat 53'; Térmens 59'	Report

Umpires:
Gina Spitaleri (ITA)
Heike Malina (GER)

17 August 2005
19:00

Ireland	0–4	Netherlands
	Report	Paumen 8', 46'; Fuchs 28'; Smabers 43'

Umpires:
Belén González Oruna (ESP)
Minka Woolley (AUS)

==== Pool B ====
Pos	Team	Pld	W	D	L	GF	GA	GD	Pts	Qualification
1	Germany	3	3	0	0	13	0	+13	9	Semifinals
2	England	3	2	0	1	8	2	+6	6	Semifinals
3	Ukraine	3	0	1	2	1	9	−8	1	
4	Scotland	3	0	1	2	2	13	−11	1	

Source: EuroHockey
Rules for classification: 1) points; 2) goal difference; 3) goals scored; 4) head-to-head result.

14 August 2005
11:45

Germany	8–0	Scotland
Rinne 10', 28'; Keller 17', 22'; Hoyer 32'; Kühn 45'; Rodewald 65'; Müller 70'	Report

Umpires:
Belén González Oruna (ESP)
Anne Logan (IRE)

14 August 2005
13:45

England	4–0	Ukraine
Walsh 9', 34'; T. Cullen 20'; Wright 22'	Report

Umpires:
Gina Spitaleri (ITA)
Stella Bartlema (NED)

15 August 2005
16:00

Scotland	1–4	England
Bunce 32'	Report	Clewlow 4'; Richardson 18'; T. Cullen 52'; King 62'

Umpires:
Stella Bartlema (NED)
Minka Woolley (AUS)

15 August 2005
18:00

Germany	4–0	Ukraine
Ernsting-Krienke 28'; Rinne 31', 53', 69'	Report

Umpires:
Anne Logan (IRE)
Gina Spitaleri (ITA)

17 August 2005
13:00

Scotland	1–1	Ukraine
Simpson 63'	Report	Vynohradova 48'

Umpires:
Alison Hill (ENG)
Stella Bartlema (NED)

17 August 2005
15:00

England	0–1	Germany
	Report	Rinne 18'

Umpires:
Anne Logan (IRE)
Anne McRae (SCO)

=== Fifth to eighth place classification ===
==== Pool C ====
Points obtained in the preliminary round are carried over into Pool C.

Pos	Team	Pld	W	D	L	GF	GA	GD	Pts	Relegation
1	Ireland	3	3	0	0	8	2	+6	9	
2	Ukraine	3	1	1	1	4	6	−2	4	
3	Scotland	3	1	1	1	7	4	+3	4	Relegated to EuroHockey Nations Challenge
4	France	3	0	0	3	1	8	−7	0	Relegated to EuroHockey Nations Challenge

Source: EuroHockey
Rules for classification: 1) points; 2) goal difference; 3) goals scored; 4) head-to-head result.
- Note: While Scotland finished with a higher goal difference within Pool C, Ukraine's overall goal difference for the tournament was deemed superior, thus relegating Scotland in 2007.

19 August 2005
09:30

Ireland	3–1	Scotland
McVicker 26'; Cregan 46'; Burke 57'	Report	Judge 12'

Umpires:
Tetyana Kaltypan (UKR)
Gina Spitaleri (ITA)

19 August 2005
12:00

Ukraine	2–1	France
Vynohradova 18'; Savenko 55'	Report	Foulard 62'

Umpires:
Heike Malina (GER)
Anne Logan (IRE)

20 August 2005
10:00

Scotland	5–0	France
Valentine 4'; Simpson 21', 70'; Semple 29'; Cram 64'	Report

Umpires:
Anne Logan (IRE)
Tetyana Kaltypan (UKR)

20 August 2005
12:30

Ireland	4–1	Ukraine
O'Brien 18'; Orbinson 36'; Burke 41'; McVicker 44'	Report	Salenko 15'

Umpires:
Heike Malina (GER)
Belén González Oruna (ENG)

=== First to fourth place classification ===
Semi-finals
19 August 2005
Netherlands	2
England	0
19 August 2005
Germany	2
Spain	1

Final
20 August 2005
Netherlands	2
Germany	1
Third Place
20 August 2005
England	4
Spain	0

==== Semifinals ====
19 August 2005
14:30

Netherlands	2–0	England
Karres 6'; Van As 46'	Report

Umpires:
Minka Woolley (AUS)
Belén González Oruna (ENG)

19 August 2005
17:00

Germany	2–1	Spain
Kühn 31'; Rinne 42'	Report	Muñoz 52'

Umpires:
Stella Bartlema (NED)
Alison Hill (ENG)

==== Third and fourth place ====
20 August 2005
15:00

England	4–0	Spain
Clewlow 8'; Danson 12'; Grant 25'; T. Cullen 66'	Report

Umpires:
Gina Spitaleri (ITA)
Anne McRae (SCO)

==== Final ====
20 August 2005
17:30

Netherlands	2–1	Germany
Hoog 7', 10'	Report	Keller 22'

Umpires:
Alison Hill (ENG)
Minka Woolley (AUS)

== Final standings ==
As per statistical convention in field hockey, matches decided in extra time are counted as wins and losses, while matches decided by penalty shoot-outs are counted as draws.

Pos	Team	Pld	W	D	L	GF	GA	GD	Pts	Status
1st place, gold medalist(s)	Netherlands	5	5	0	0	16	1	+15	15	Qualified for 2006 FIH World Cup
2nd place, silver medalist(s)	Germany	5	4	0	1	16	3	+13	12	
3rd place, bronze medalist(s)	England	5	3	0	2	12	4	+8	9	
4	Spain	5	1	1	3	7	9	−2	4	
5	Ireland (H)	5	3	1	1	8	6	+2	10	
6	Ukraine	5	1	1	3	4	14	−10	4	
7	Scotland	5	1	1	3	8	16	−8	4	Relegated to EuroHockey Nations Trophy
8	France	5	0	0	5	1	19	−18	0	Relegated to EuroHockey Nations Trophy

Source: EuroHockey
(H) Hosts
- Note: While Scotland finished with a higher goal difference within Pool C, Ukraine's overall goal difference for the tournament was deemed superior, thus relegating Scotland in 2007.

== Goalscorers ==
There were 72 goals scored in 20 matches, for an average of 3.6 goals per match.

7 goals

- (Germany) Fanny Rinne

4 goals

- (Netherlands) Kim Lammers
- (Netherlands) Maartje Paumen

3 goals

- (England) Tina Cullen
- (Germany) Natascha Keller
- (Netherlands) Sylvia Karres
- (Scotland) Rhona Simpson
- (Spain) Silvia Muñoz

2 goals

- (England) Melanie Clewlow
- (England) Kate Walsh
- (Germany) Anke Kühn
- (Ireland) Jennifer Burke
- (Ireland) Lynsey McVicker
- (Netherlands) Ellen Hoog
- (Ukraine) Maryna Vynohradova

1 goal

- (England) Alexandra Danson
- (England) Helen Grant
- (England) Leisa King
- (England) Helen Richardson
- (England) Lucilla Wright
- (France) Muriel Foulard
- (Germany) Nadine Ernsting-Krienke
- (Germany) Kerstin Hoyer
- (Germany) Silke Müller
- (Germany) Marion Rodewald
- (Ireland) Linda Caulfield
- (Ireland) Eimear Cregan
- (Ireland) Ciara O'Brien
- (Ireland) Jill Orbinson
- (Netherlands) Naomi van As
- (Netherlands) Saskia Fuchs
- (Netherlands) Minke Smabers
- (Scotland) Victoria Bunce
- (Scotland) Holly Cram
- (Scotland) Samantha Judge
- (Scotland) Catriona Semple
- (Scotland) Cheryl Valentine
- (Spain) Lucía Antona
- (Spain) Bárbara Malda
- (Spain) Marta Prat
- (Spain) Esther Térmens
- (Ukraine) Tetyana Salenko
- (Ukraine) Zhanna Savenko

== See also ==
- 2005 Men's EuroHockey Nations Championship
- 2005 Women's EuroHockey Nations Trophy
