= Eimear Cregan =

Irish field hockey player (born 1982)

Personal information
- Born: 1 March 1982 (age 44) Limerick, Ireland
- Height: 165 cm (5 ft 5 in)
- Weight: 62 kg (137 lb)

Sport
- Sport: Field hockey
- Position: Forward
National team
Years	Team	Caps	Goals
2001–2011	Ireland	171	(26)
Medal record
Women's field hockey
Representing Ireland
FIH Champions Challenge II
Bronze medal – third place	2009 Kazan

Eimear Cregan (born 1 March 1982) is a retired field hockey player from Ireland.

== Personal life ==
Eimear Cregan was born in Limerick, Ireland.

Her uncle, Éamonn Cregan, is a former Gaelic footballer and hurler.

== Career ==
Cregan made her international debut for the Green Army in 2001. She earned her first senior cap during a test match against Wales.

From 2008, until her retirement, Cregan served as captain of the national team. During this time, she led the team to a bronze medal at the FIH Champions Challenge II in Kazan. This marked Ireland's first ever medal in an international tournament hosted by the International Hockey Federation.

She set the Irish representative record in 2010, overtaking the cap record set by Rachel Kohler in 2003.

In February 2011, at the age of just 28, Cregan announced her retirement from international hockey. She cited her retirement as being a result of a longstanding degenerative arthritic condition, which was affecting both of her knees.

Major International Tournaments

Throughout her career, Cregan competed at the following major tournaments.

- 2001 Intercontinental Cup – Amiens and Abbeville
- 2002 FIH World Cup – Perth
- 2003 EuroHockey Championships – Barcelona
- 2004 FIH Olympic Qualifiers – Auckland
- 2005 EuroHockey Championships – Dublin
- 2006 Intercontinental Cup – Rome
- 2007 EuroHockey Championships – Manchester
- 2008 FIH Olympic Qualifiers – Victoria
- 2009 FIH Champions Challenge II – Kazan
- 2009 EuroHockey Championships – Amsterdam
- 2010 FIH World Cup Qualifiers – Santiago
