= Greece women's national field hockey team =

Greece
- Association: Hellenic Hockey Federation
- Confederation: EHF (Europe)

FIH ranking
- Current: NR (4 March 2025)

The Greece women's national field hockey team represents Greece in women's international field hockey and is controlled by the Hellenic Hockey Federation, the governing body for Hockey in Greece.

Greece hosted and participated in the 2013 Women's EuroHockey Championship III, where it finished in 6th and last place.

== Tournament record ==
=== EuroHockey Championship III ===
- 2013 – 6th place

== See also ==
- Greece men's national field hockey team
