= Anke Kühne =

German field hockey player (born 1981)

Anke Kühn
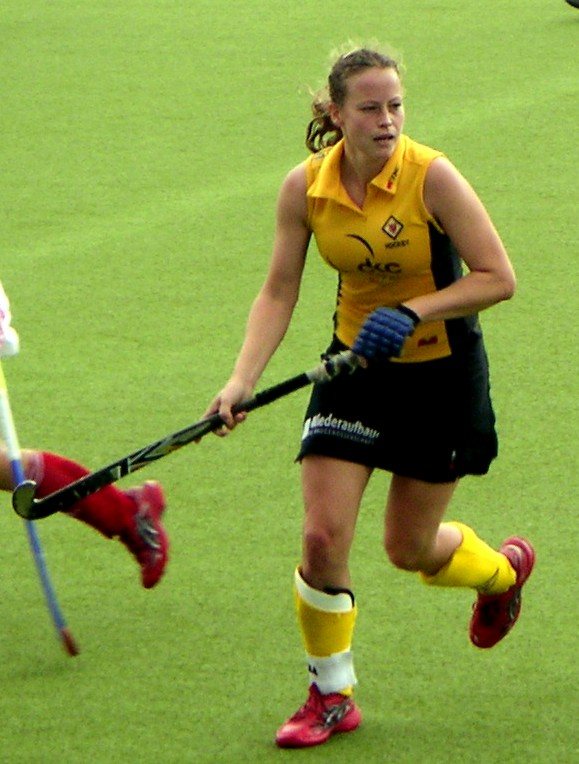

Personal information
- Born: 28 February 1981 (age 45) Hanover, Lower; Saxony, West Germany
- Height: 1.75 m (5 ft 9 in)
- Weight: 70 kg (154 lb)

Sport
- Sport: Field hockey
Senior career
Years	Team	Caps	Goals
1992–1997	DTV Hannover	-	-
1997–	Eintracht Braunschweig	-	-
National team
Years	Team	Caps	Goals
2003–	Germany	181	-
Medal record
Women's field hockey
Representing Germany
Olympic Games
Gold medal – first place	2004 Athens	Team competition
Champions Trophy
Gold medal – first place	2006 Amstelveen	Team competition
Silver medal – second place	2004 Rosario	Team competition
Champions Challenge
Gold medal – first place	2003 Catania	Team competition
European Championship
Gold medal – first place	2007 Manchester	Team competition
Silver medal – second place	2005 Dublin	Team competition
Bronze medal – third place	2003 Barcelona	Team competition

Anke Kühne (née Kühn, born 28 February 1981) is a field hockey player from Germany, who played for the German national team and won the gold medal at the 2004 Summer Olympics in Athens, Greece. She is married to German sculler Tobias Kühne. She has represented Germany in 181 matches.

Kühne began her career with TSV Engensen alongside Kerstin Hoyer, also on the national team, and played there from 1985 to 1991. She went on to play for HC Hannover and remained there from 1991 to 1992. From 1992 to 1997, she played for DTV Hannover. Since 1997, she has been playing for Eintracht Braunschweig in the first and second Bundesliga.
