= Azerbaijan women's national field hockey team =

Women's field hockey team

Azerbaijan
- Association: Azerbaijan Field Hockey Federation
- Confederation: EHF (Europe)

FIH ranking
- Current: NR (4 March 2025)

EuroHockey Championship
- Appearances: 4 (first in 2003)
- Best result: 5th (2007)

The Azerbaijan women's national field hockey team represents Azerbaijan in international women's field hockey and is controlled by the Azerbaijan Field Hockey Federation, the governing body for field hockey in Azerbaijan.

The national team hasn't participated in any international competitions since November 2016 because the national association was suspended on 12 November 2016.

== Tournament records ==
=== European Championships ===
- 2003 – 9th place
- 2007 – 5th place
- 2009 – 6th place
- 2011 – 7th place

=== World League ===
- 2012–13 – 20th place
- 2014–15 – 38th place

=== Champions Challenge ===
- 2007 – 6th place
- 2009 – 7th place
- 2011 – 8th place
