= Fanny Rinne =

German field hockey player

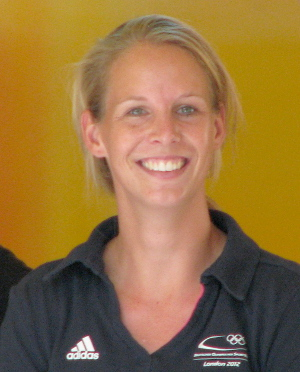
- Rinne in 2012

Personal information
- Full name: Fanny Rinne-Cihlar
- Born: 15 April 1980 (age 46) Mannheim, Baden-Württemberg, West Germany
- Height: 178 cm (5 ft 10 in)
- Weight: 64 kg (141 lb)

Sport
- Sport: Field hockey
Medal record
Women's field hockey
Representing Germany
Olympic Games
| Gold medal – first place | 2004 Athens | Team |
European Championship
| Gold medal – first place | 2007 Manchester | Team |
| Silver medal – second place | 1999 Cologne | Team |
| Silver medal – second place | 2005 Dublin | Team |
| Silver medal – second place | 2011 Gladbach | Team |
| Bronze medal – third place | 2003 Barcelona | Team |
Champions Trophy
| Gold medal – first place | 2006 Amstelveen | Team |
| Silver medal – second place | 2000 Amstelveen | Team |
| Silver medal – second place | 2004 Rosario | Team |
| Silver medal – second place | 2008 Mönchengladbach | Team |
| Bronze medal – third place | 1999 Brisbane | Team |
| Bronze medal – third place | 2007 Quilmes | Team |
Champions Challenge
| Gold medal – first place | 2003 Catania | Team |

Fanny Rinne-Cihlar (née Rinne, born 15 April 1980 in Mannheim, Baden-Württemberg) is a field hockey midfielder from Germany.

She competed for Germany at the 2000, 2004, 2008 and 2012 Summer Olympics.

Rinne has been married to Volker Cihlar since 2015. The couple has a son together.

== International senior tournaments ==
- 1999 – Champions Trophy, Brisbane (3rd place)
- 1999 – European Nations Cup, Cologne (2nd place)
- 2000 – Olympic Qualifying Tournament, Milton Keynes (3rd place)
- 2000 – Champions Trophy, Amstelveen (2nd place)
- 2000 – Summer Olympics, Sydney (7th place)
- 2002 – European Indoor Nations Cup, France (1st place)
- 2002 – World Cup, Perth (7th place)
- 2003 – World Indoor Nations Cup, Leipzig (1st place)
- 2003 – Champions Challenge, Catania (1st place)
- 2003 – European Nations Cup, Barcelona (3rd place)
- 2004 – Olympic Qualifier, Auckland (4th place)
- 2004 – Summer Olympics, Athens (1st place)
- 2004 – Champions Trophy, Rosario (2nd place)
- 2005 – European Championship, Dublin (2nd)
- 2006 – World Cup, Madrid (8thplace)
- 2007 – European Championship, Manchester (1st place)
- 2007 – Champions Trophy, Quilmes (3rd place)
- 2008 – Champions Trophy, Mönchengladbach (2nd place)
- 2008 – Summer Olympics, Beijing (4th place)
