= Hockey in Greece =

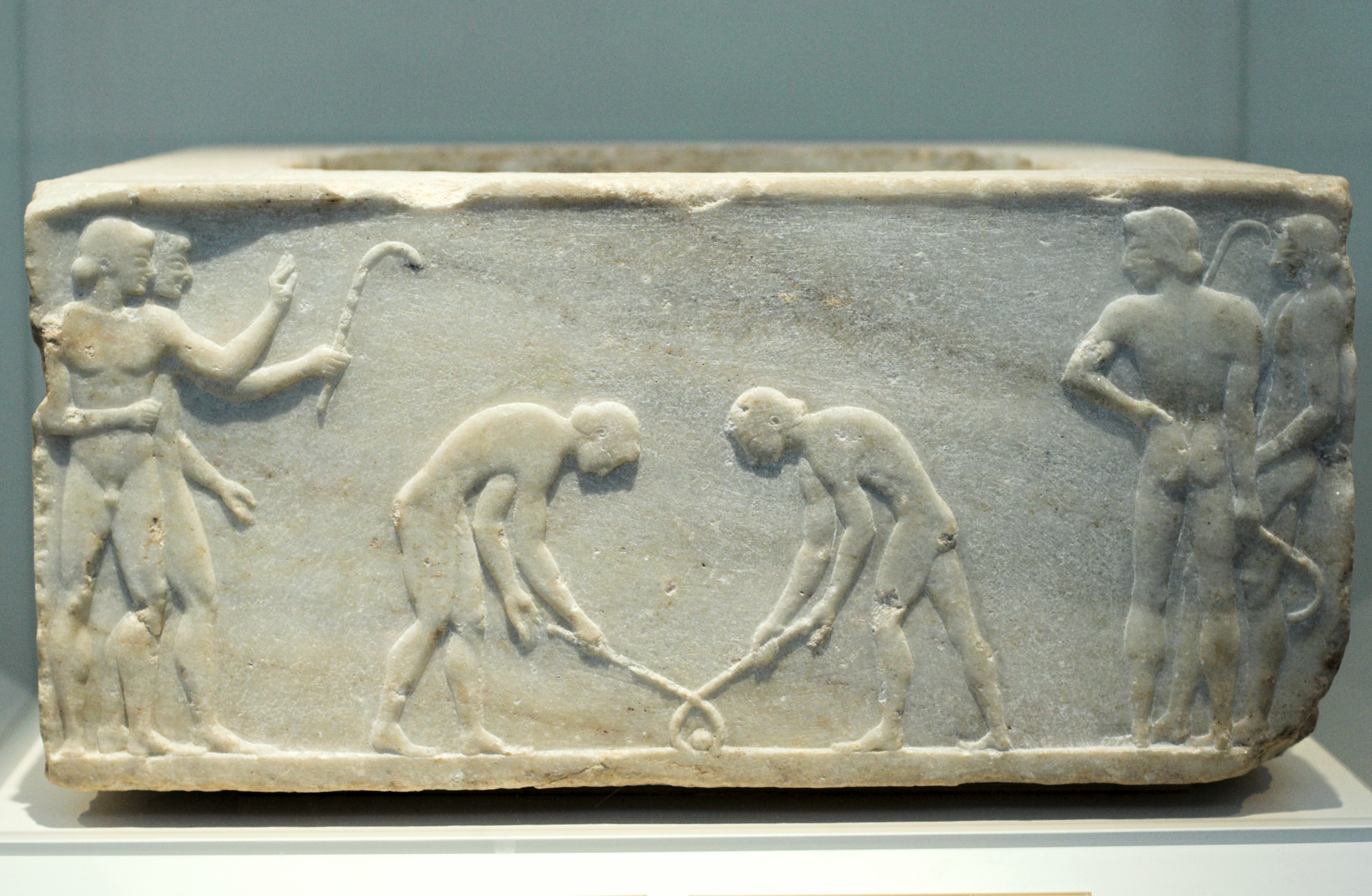
Relief of 510 B.C. depicting hockey players

Field hockey and ice hockey are not popular sports in Greece. Until recently, an organized championship did not exist and only amateur tournaments were organised by few fans of the sport. The establishment of hockey federations is relatively recent as well as the organisation of Panhellenic championships. However, a form of this game was played by ancient Greeks. A marble relief of 510 B.C., on display at the Archaeological Museum of Athens, depicts athletes that play a sport like hockey. In addition, the 2nd-century BC writer Plutarch (or Pseudo-Plutarch) refers to a sport like hockey with the name Keretizein (Κερητίζειν).

== Field hockey ==
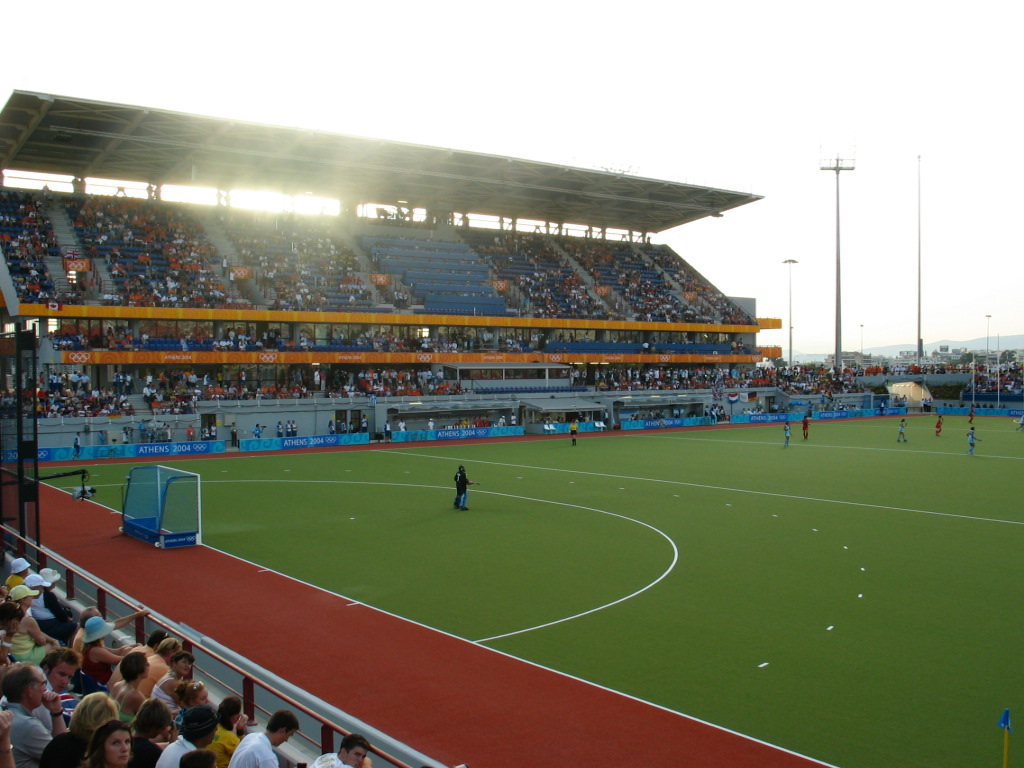
Hellinicon Olympic Hockey Center

The first appearance of field hockey in Greece dates to the interwar period. It was introduced in the country by Panathinaikos A.O. in the early 20th century, but a national championship was organized much later. At the first post-World War II years the sport was played only in Anavryta Schools in Kifissia. Many years later, in 1994, the Greek Field Hockey Federation was founded and just after the Greek championship was held with the presence of six clubs. The first champion was the club AOH Hymettus from Anavryta Schools. The next years the hockey clubs increase. In 1998, the indoor hockey championship started. Because of the 2004 Athens Olympics a field hockey venue was created in Hellinikon Olympic Complex, the Hellinikon Olympic Hockey Centre. After the Olympics interest about the sport remained low, so in 2014 the Greek Field Hockey Federation was abolished, a move associated with a scandal related with the conducting of fake youth championships so that the athletes would gain bonus for the university entry exams.

== Ice hockey ==
Greek ice hockey clubs were found in North America since 1920. In Greece itself the sport began in 1984 by players that had come from abroad. At first, there were only five clubs, Iptamenoi Pagodromoi, Aris Thessaloniki, Avantes Chalkis, Tarandus Moschato and PAS Piraeus. In 1986 the Greek Federation of Ice Sports was founded. The federation regulates ice hockey as well as ice skating and curling. Soon the first official championship was held in the Peace and Friendship Stadium, in 1989. The Peace and Friendship Stadium was the first big stadium with an ice rink in Greece. The Greece national team was formed in 1992. Despite the initial growth of the sport financial problems led to temporary stopping of ice hockey action. The championship stopped from 1994 to 1999 and the national team confronted great difficulties. Another championship was held in 2000 and the next was held in 2008. A continuing problem for the growth of the sport is the insufficiency of ice rinks. Today few permanent ice rinks operate in Athens and Thessaloniki.
