= 2007 Women's EuroHockey Nations Championship =

International field hockey competition

EURO 2007
- Official logo

Tournament details
- Host country: England
- City: Manchester
- Teams: 8
- Venue: Belle Vue Regional Hockey Centre

Final positions
- Champions: Germany (1st title)
- Runner-up: Netherlands
- Third place: England

Tournament statistics
- Matches played: 20
- Goals scored: 77 (3.85 per match)
- Top scorer: (Germany) Maike Stöckel (5 goals)
- Best player: (Netherlands) Marilyn Agliotti

The 2007 Women's EuroHockey Nations Championship was the 8th edition of the women's field hockey championship organised by the European Hockey Federation. It was held in Manchester, England from August 18 to August 25, 2007.

In the final, Germany upset Netherlands to clinch the first title. Meanwhile, England secured the last automatic berth for 2008 Summer Olympics after defeated Spain in third place match.

== Results ==
All times are Central European Summer Time (UTC +2)

=== Preliminary round ===
==== Pool A ====
Pos	Team	Pld	W	D	L	GF	GA	GD	Pts	Qualification
1	Netherlands	3	3	0	0	16	1	+15	9	Advanced to Semi-finals
2	England	3	2	0	1	7	1	+6	6	Advanced to Semi-finals
3	Ireland	3	1	0	2	3	9	−6	3	Pool C
4	Italy	3	0	0	3	1	16	−15	0	Pool C

Source: Manchester2007
Rules for classification: 1) points; 2) goal difference; 3) goals scored; 4) head-to-head result.

18 August 2007
15:00

England	3–0	Ireland
Danson 18'; Wright 35'; Gilliat-Smith 37'	Report

Umpires:
Stella Bartlema (NED)
Tatiana Kaltypan (UKR)

18 August 2007
17:45

Netherlands	9–1	Italy
Paumen 6'; Agliotti 11', 45'; Mulder 18', 46'; Booij 43', 53'; Van As 60'; Dijkstra 68'	Report	Faustini 49'

Umpires:
Anne McRae (SCO)
Christiane Hippler (GER)

20 August 2007
13:00

England	4–0	Italy
Richardson 10', 36'; Clewlow 25'; Walker 57'	Report

Umpires:
Christiane Hippler (GER)
Tatiana Kaltypan (UKR)

20 August 2007
15:00

Ireland	0–6	Netherlands
	Report	Lammers 11', 15', 27', 30'; Van As 32', 55'

Umpires:
Monica Rivera (ESP)
Anne McRae (SCO)

21 August 2007
15:00

Ireland	3–0	Italy
McKean 11'; McDonough 42'; Symmons 65'	Report

Umpires:
Frances Block (ENG)
Tatiana Kaltypan (UKR)

21 August 2007
19:00

Netherlands	1–0	England
Booij 46'	Report

Umpires:
Carol Metchette (IRL)
Monica Rivera (ESP)

==== Pool B ====
Pos	Team	Pld	W	D	L	GF	GA	GD	Pts	Qualification
1	Germany	3	3	0	0	15	1	+14	9	Advanced to Semi-finals
2	Spain	3	1	1	1	6	4	+2	4	Advanced to Semi-finals
3	Azerbaijan	3	1	1	1	6	10	−4	4	Pool C
4	Ukraine	3	0	0	3	2	14	−12	0	Pool C

Source: Manchester2007
Rules for classification: 1) points; 2) goal difference; 3) goals scored; 4) head-to-head result.

18 August 2007
11:00

Spain	4–1	Ukraine
Muñoz 2'; Termens 27'; Ybarra 55'; Camón 70'	Report	Vasyukova 30'

Umpires:
Marelize de Clerk (RSA)
Gina Spitaleri (ITA)

18 August 2007
13:00

Germany	7–1	Azerbaijan
Beermann 15'; Bachmann 19'; Kühn 25', 45'; Schürmann 26'; Stöckel 47'; Eidmann 69'	Report	Suleymanova 42'

Umpires:
Carolina de la Fuente (ARG)
Monica Rivera (ESP)

20 August 2007
09:00

Spain	2–2	Azerbaijan
Ybarra 25', 51'	Report	Mirzaliyeva 5'; Nuriyeva 15'

Umpires:
Stella Bartlema (NED)
Frances Block (ENG)

20 August 2007

Ukraine	0–7	Germany
	Report	Stöckel 15', 25', 61'; Rodewald 21'; Rinne 43', 46'; Hoffmann 67'

Umpires:
Carol Metchette (IRL)
Gina Spitaleri (ITA)

21 August 2007
13:00

Ukraine	1–3	Azerbaijan
Salenko 18'	Report	Mirzaliyeva 40', 53'; Jafarova 58'

Umpires:
Carolina de la Fuente (ARG)
Gina Spitaleri (ITA)

21 August 2007
17:00

Germany	1–0	Spain
Hoffmann 31'	Report

Umpires:
Marelize de Klerk (RSA)
Anne McRae (SCO)

=== Classification round ===
==== Fifth to eighth place classification ====
The teams who finished third and fourth in their respective pools are carried to this pool. They have to play two matches in this pool with the opponents they had not met while carrying the results for their matches against the played opponents.

The team finishing at the top of this pool classified as the fifth-place winner.

===== Pool C =====
Pos	Team	Pld	W	D	L	GF	GA	GD	Pts	Relegation
5	Azerbaijan	3	3	0	0	6	2	+4	9	
6	Ireland	3	2	0	1	6	3	+3	6	
7	Italy	3	1	0	2	1	4	−3	3	Relegated to 2009 EuroHockey Nations Trophy
8	Ukraine	3	0	0	3	2	6	−4	0	Relegated to 2009 EuroHockey Nations Trophy

Source: Manchester2007
Rules for classification: 1) points; 2) goal difference; 3) goals scored; 4) head-to-head result.

23 August 2007
12:00

Ireland	2–1	Ukraine
Cregan 7', 29'	Report	Vynohradova 32'

Umpires:
Frances Block (ENG)
Christiane Hippler (GER)

23 August 2007
14:00

Azerbaijan	1–0	Italy
Nuriyeva 70'	Report

Umpires:
Stella Bartlema (NED)
Carol Melchette (IRL)

25 August 2007
10:00

Italy	1–0	Ukraine
Faustini 4'	Report

Umpires:
Christiane Hippler (GER)
Carol Metchette (IRL)

25 August 2007
12:00

Ireland	1–2	Azerbaijan
Caulfield 21'	Report	Zeynalova 35'; Jafarova 46'

Umpires:
Stella Bartlema (NED)
Frances Block (ENG)

==== First to fourth place classification ====
Semi-finals
23 August 2007
Netherlands	3
Spain	0
23 August 2007
Germany	2
England	1

Final
25 August 2007
Netherlands	0
Germany	2
Third Place
25 August 2007
Spain	2
England	3

===== Semi-finals =====
23 August 2007
16:00

Netherlands	3–0	Spain
Agliotti 9'; Schopman 43'; Welten 55'	Report

Umpires:
Carolina de la Fuente (ARG)
Gina Spitaleri (ITA)

23 August 2007
18:30

Germany	2–1	England
Kühn 22'; Stöckel 34'	Report	Wright 66'

Umpires:
Marelize de Klerk (RSA)
Monica Rivera (ESP)

===== Third and fourth place =====
25 August 2007
14:00

Spain	2–3	England
Termens 61'; Muñoz 67'	Report	Clewlow 15'; Cullen 24', 49'

Umpires:
Carolina de la Fuente (ARG)
Marelize de Klerk (RSA)

===== Final =====
25 August 2007
16:30

Netherlands	0–2	Germany
	Report	Beermann 2', 40'

Umpires:
Anne McRae (SCO)
Gina Spitaleri (ITA)

== Awards ==
Player of the Tournament	Top Goalscorer	Goalkeeper of the Tournament	Fair Play Award
(Netherlands) Marilyn Agliotti	(Germany) Maike Stöckel	(Germany) Kristina Reynolds	Ireland

== Statistics ==
=== Final standings ===
As per statistical convention in field hockey, matches decided in extra time are counted as wins and losses, while matches decided by penalty shoot-outs are counted as draws.

Pos	Team	Pld	W	D	L	GF	GA	GD	Pts	Status
1st place, gold medalist(s)	Germany	5	5	0	0	19	2	+17	15	Qualified for 2008 Summer Olympics
2nd place, silver medalist(s)	Netherlands	5	4	0	1	19	3	+16	12	
3rd place, bronze medalist(s)	England	5	3	0	2	11	5	+6	9	
4	Spain	5	1	1	3	8	10	−2	4	
5	Azerbaijan	5	3	1	1	9	11	−2	10	
6	Ireland	5	2	0	3	6	12	−6	6	
7	Italy	5	1	0	4	2	17	−15	3	Relegated to EuroHockey Nations Trophy
8	Ukraine	5	0	0	5	3	17	−14	0	Relegated to EuroHockey Nations Trophy

Source: Manchester2007

=== Goalscorers ===
There were 77 goals scored in 20 matches, for an average of 3.85 goals per match.

5 goals

- (Germany) Maike Stöckel

4 goals

- (Netherlands) Kim Lammers

3 goals

- (Azerbaijan) Dilfuza Mirzaliyeva
- (Germany) Janine Beermann
- (Germany) Anke Kühn
- (Netherlands) Marilyn Agliotti
- (Netherlands) Naomi van As
- (Netherlands) Minke Booij
- (Spain) Rocío Ybarra

2 goals

- (Azerbaijan) Inoyathon Jafarova
- (England) Melanie Clewlow
- (England) Crista Cullen
- (England) Helen Richardson
- (England) Lucilla Wright
- (Germany) Eileen Hoffmann
- (Germany) Fanny Rinne
- (Ireland) Eimear Cregan
- (Italy) Francesca Faustini
- (Netherlands) Eefke Mulder
- (Spain) Silvia Muñoz
- (Spain) Esther Termens

1 goal

- (Azerbaijan) Liana Nuriyeva
- (Azerbaijan) Zeynab Nuriyeva
- (Azerbaijan) Zhang Suleymanova
- (Azerbaijan) Zarifahon Zeynalova
- (England) Alexandra Danson
- (England) Catherine Gilliat-Smith
- (England) Rachel Walker
- (Germany) Tina Bachmann
- (Germany) Pia Eidmann
- (Germany) Marion Rodewald
- (Germany) Svenja Schürmann
- (Ireland) Linda Caulfield
- (Ireland) Jennifer McDonough
- (Ireland) Catherine McKean
- (Ireland) Nicola Symmons
- (Netherlands) Wieke Dijkstra
- (Netherlands) Maartje Paumen
- (Netherlands) Janneke Schopman
- (Netherlands) Carlijn Welten
- (Spain) Núria Camón
- (Ukraine) Tetyana Salenko
- (Ukraine) Nataliya Vasyukova
- (Ukraine) Maryna Vynohradova
