= Cheryl Valentine =

Scottish field hockey player

Cheryl Valentine (born 8 April 1980, in Dundee) is a female field hockey midfield player from Scotland. She played over 100 times for the Women's National Team.

She played club hockey for Bonagrass Grove, and made her debut for the Women's National Team in 2000. She announced her retirement for international competitions in 2007.

Valentine studied at Queen Margaret University College, graduating in 2002 with a BSc (hons) in Physiotherapy and now works as a physiotherapist in Lothian.
