= Lynsey McVicker =

Irish field hockey player (born 1974)

Personal information
- Full name: Lynsey Denise McVicker
- Born: 14 January 1974 (age 52) Ballymoney, Northern Ireland
- Height: 165 cm (5 ft 5 in)
- Weight: 62 kg (137 lb)

Sport
- Sport: Field hockey
- Position: Forward
National team
| Years | Team | Caps | Goals |
| 1993–2005 | Ireland | 153 | (65) |

Lynsey Denise McVicker MBE (born 14 January 1974) is a retired field hockey player from Ireland.

== Personal life ==
Lynsey McVicker was born in Ballymoney, Northern Ireland.

Her grandfather was Jim McVicker, a former international in rugby union for Northern Ireland.

== Hockey ==
=== College career ===
From 1995–1997, McVicker moved to the United States for college, representing the University of Maryland.

=== Senior national team ===
McVicker received her first call-up to the Green Army in 1993.

Following her debut, she returned to the national squad in 1994. She was named in the Irish squad for the 1994 FIH World Cup in Dublin. This was an historic occasion, as it marked Ireland's first ever appearance at any edition of the FIH World Cup.

Throughout her senior international career, she became one of the most capped players for in Irish history at the time. She also set the goalscoring record for the national team, a record which stood for 13 years, which was broken by Anna O'Flanagan at the 2018 FIH World Cup. She also served as captain of the national team.

Major International Tournaments

Throughout her career, McVicker competed at the following major tournaments.

- 1994 FIH World Cup – Dublin
- 1995 EuroHockey Championships – Amsterdam
- 1997 Intercontinental Cup – Harare
- 1999 EuroHockey Championships – Cologne
- 2001 Intercontinental Cup – Amiens and Abbeville
- 2002 FIH World Cup – Perth
- 2003 EuroHockey Championships – Barcelona
- 2004 FIH Olympic Qualifiers – Auckland
- 2005 EuroHockey Championships – Dublin

== Awards ==
In 2007, McVicker was appointed Member of the Order of the British Empire (MBE) in the Queen's Birthday Honours for services to hockey in Northern Ireland.
